= 2024 FIBA Europe Cup Finals =

Finals of the 2023–24 edition of the FIBA Europe Cup

- Event: 2023–24 FIBA Europe Cup
| Niners Chemnitz | Bahçeşehir Koleji |
| (Germany) | (Turkey) |
|---|---|
| 180 | 179 |

First leg
| Niners Chemnitz | Bahçeşehir Koleji |
|---|---|
| 85 | 74 |
- Date: 17 April 2024
- Venue: Messe Chemnitz, Chemnitz
- MVP: Kaza Kajami-Keane
- Referees: Georgios Poursanidis (GRE), Fernando Calatrava (SPA), Gvidas Gedvilas (LTU)
- Attendance: 5,000

Second leg
| Bahçeşehir Koleji | Niners Chemnitz |
|---|---|
| 105 | 95 |
- Date: 24 April 2024
- Venue: Ülker Sports Arena, Istanbul
- Referees: Luis Miguel Castillo (SPA), Nicolas Maestre (FRA), Martin Horozov (BUL)
- Attendance: 11,278

The 2024 FIBA Europe Cup Finals were the concluding games of the 2023–24 FIBA Europe Cup season. As in previous years, the finals were played in a two-legged format, with the first leg being played on 17 April and the second one on 24 April 2024. The finals were played between German side Niners Chemnitz and Turkish side Bahçeşehir Koleji. Bahçeşehir Koleji played their second Europe Cup finals, having won the 2022 finals, while Chemnitz played in their first-ever final.

== Venues ==
| Chemnitz | 2024 FIBA Europe Cup Finals (Europe) | Istanbul |
| Messe Chemnitz | 2024 FIBA Europe Cup Finals (Europe) | Ülker Sports and Event Hall |
| Capacity: 5,000 | 2024 FIBA Europe Cup Finals (Europe) | Capacity: 13,059 |

== Background ==
Niners Chemnitz came into the finals with a 14–2 record in the 2023–24 FIBA Europe Cup season and defeated Zaragoza by 50 points in the quarter-finals, before shocking Bilbao Basket in the semi-finals as well. They were having a successful season in the 2023–24 Basketball Bundesliga as well, sitting in second place with a 22–5 record. Chemnitz was the second German team to play in a Europe Cup final, following the Fraport Skyliners in 2016. Phil Scrubb was on the Skyliners' championship winning roster and played his second finals with Chemnitz.

Bahçeşehir Koleji had a 13–3 record in the Europe Cup, and had a 10–16 record in the 2023–24 Basketbol Süper Ligi heading into the finals. They had the chance to become the first team in competition history to win the Europe Cup twice.

== Road to the Finals ==
Note: In the table, the score of the finalist is given first (H = home; A = away).

| (Germany) Niners Chemnitz | | | | Round | (Turkey) Bahçeşehir Koleji | | | |
|---|---|---|---|---|---|---|---|---|
| Group H: Pos / Team / Pld / Pts; 1 / (German Basketball Federation) Niners Chemnitz / 6 / 12; 2 / (Polish Basketball Federation) PGE Spójnia Stargard / 6 / 9; 3 / (Basketball Federation of Kosovo) Peja / 6 / 8; 4 / (Basketball Nederland) Heroes Den Bosch / 6 / 7; Source: FIBA Europe Cup | | | | Regular season | Group D: Pos / Team / Pld / Pts; 1 / (Turkish Basketball Federation) Bahçeşehir Koleji / 6 / 11; 2 / (Czech Basketball Federation) ERA Nymburk / 6 / 11; 3 / (Azerbaijan Basketball Federation) Sabah / 6 / 7; 4 / (Basketball Federation of Montenegro) Mornar Barsko zlato / 6 / 7; Source: FIBA Europe Cup | | | |
| Group N: Pos / Team / Pld / Pts; 1 / (German Basketball Federation) Niners Chemnitz / 6 / 11; 2 / (Italian Basketball Federation) Itelyum Varese / 6 / 9; 3 / (Romanian Basketball Federation) CSM Oradea / 6 / 8; 4 / (Basketball Nederland) ZZ Leiden / 6 / 8; Source: FIBA Europe Cup | | | | Second round | Group L: Pos / Team / Pld / Pts; 1 / (Turkish Basketball Federation) Bahçeşehir Koleji / 6 / 12; 2 / (Polish Basketball Federation) Legia Warsaw / 6 / 10; 3 / (Portuguese Basketball Federation) Sporting CP / 6 / 8; 4 / (Lithuanian Basketball Federation) CBet Jonava / 6 / 6; Source: FIBA Europe Cup | | | |
| Opponent | Agg. | 1st leg | 2nd leg | Play-offs | Opponent | Agg. | 1st leg | 2nd leg |
| (Spanish Basketball Federation) Casademont Zaragoza | 200–150 | 98–64 (A) | 102–86 (H) | Quarterfinals | (Portuguese Basketball Federation) FC Porto | 168–142 | 90–80 (A) | 88–52 (H) |
| (Spanish Basketball Federation) Surne Bilbao Basket | 171–155 | 98–73 (A) | 73–82 (H) | Semifinals | (Italian Basketball Federation) Itelyum Varese | 161–154 | 81–80 (A) | 81–73 (H) |

== First leg ==
| 17 April 2023 | Niners Chemnitz (Germany) | 85–74 | (Turkey) Bahçeşehir Koleji | Chemnitz |
| 19:00 (UTC+2) | Scoring by quarter: 29–18, 21–18, 18–22, 17–16 |
| | Pts: Lansdowne 16; Rebs: Garrett 9 Asts: Lansdowne 8 Eff: Lansdowne 20 | Boxscore | Pts: Bouteille 25; Rebs: Cavanaugh 10; Asts: Taylor 7 Eff: Bouteille 24 | Arena: Messe Chemnitz; Attendance: 5,000; Referees: Georgios Poursanidis (GRE), Fernando Calatrava (SPA), Gvidas Gedvilas (LTU) |

== Second leg ==
| 24 April 2023 | Bahçeşehir Koleji (Turkey) | 105–95(OT) | (Germany) Niners Chemnitz | Istanbul |
| 19:00 (UTC+3) | Scoring by quarter: 18–19, 37–19, 12–29, 28–17, Overtime: 10–11 |
| | Pts: Boutsiele 24; Rebs: Cavanaugh 7 Asts: Scrubb 6 Eff: Boutsiele 28 | Boxscore | Pts: Kajami-Keane 29; Rebs: Krubally 5 Asts: Kajami-Keane 4 Eff: Kajami-Keane 26 | Arena: Ülker Sports Arena; Attendance: 11,278; Referees: Luis Miguel Castillo (SPA), Nicolas Maestre (FRA), Martin Horozov (BUL) |

== See also ==
- 2024 EuroLeague Final Four
- 2024 EuroCup Finals
- 2024 Basketball Champions League Final Four
