= FIBA Europe Cup Final MVP =

The FIBA Europe Cup Final MVP, previously the Final Four MVP, is an annual award that is given to the best player of the finals of a given FIBA Europe Cup season. The award was handed out in 2016 and 2021, seasons in which there was a final four format. From 2022, the award is given to the best player in the final series.

== Winners ==
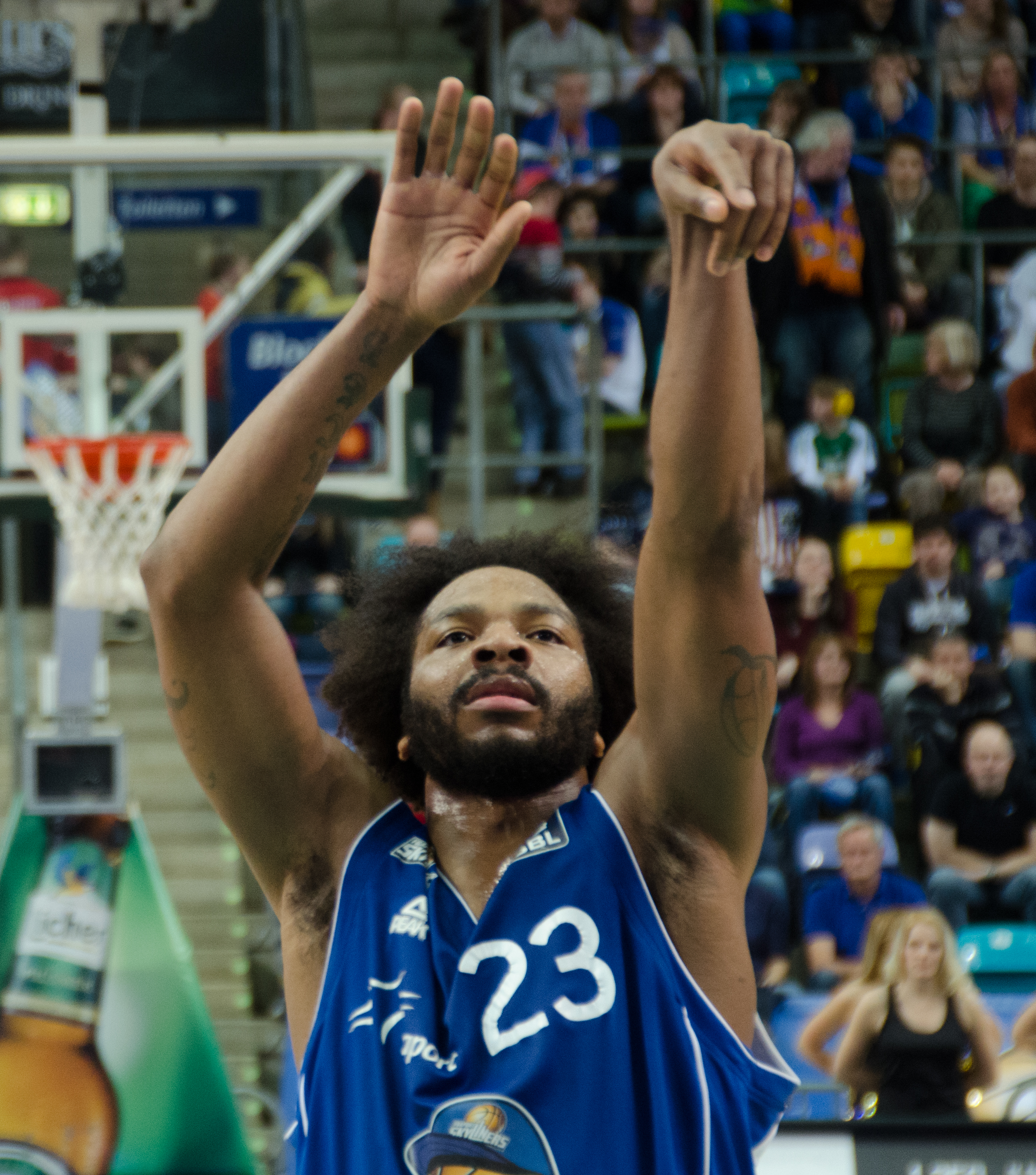
Quantez Robertson was the first ever award winner

FIBA Europe Cup Final Four MVP winners
| Season | Player | Nationality | Club | Ref(s) |
|---|---|---|---|---|
| 2015–16 | Quantez Robertson | United States | (Germany) Fraport Skyliners | |
| 2020–21 | Wayne Selden Jr. | United States | (Israel) Ironi Nes Ziona | |
| 2021–22 | Jamar Smith | United States | (Turkey) Bahçeşehir Koleji | |
| 2022–23 | Phil Greene IV | United States | (Poland) Anwil Włocławek | |
| 2023–24 | Kaza Kajami-Keane | Canada | (Germany) Niners Chemnitz | |
| 2024–25 | Melwin Pantzar | Sweden | (Spain) Surne Bilbao Basket | |
| 2025–26 | Darrun Hilliard | United States | (Spain) Surne Bilbao Basket | |

== Multiple honors ==
=== Player nationality ===
| Rank | Country | Total |
|---|---|---|
| 1. | United States | 5 |
| 2. | Canada | 1 |
| 2. | Sweden | 1 |

=== Teams ===
| Rank | Team | Total |
|---|---|---|
| 1. | (Spanish Basketball Federation) Bilbao Basket | 2 |
| 2. | (Poland) Anwil Włocławek | 1 |
| 2. | (Turkey) Bahçeşehir Koleji | 1 |
| 2. | (Germany) Fraport Skyliners | 1 |
| 2. | (Israel) Ironi Nes Ziona | 1 |
| 2. | (Germany) Niners Chemnitz | 1 |
