= 2023–24 FIBA Europe Cup =

European basketball competition

- Season: 2023–24
- Dates: Qualifying: 2–5 October 2023; Competition proper: 18 October 2023–24 April 2024
- Teams: Competition proper: 40 (Note: Finally, 37 teams from 24 countries participated as the three Israeli teams Bnei Herzliya, Hapoel Galil Elyon and Ironi Ness Ziona were suspended its games by FIBA Europe from regular season onwards in response to the Gaza war.) (from 25 countries); Total: 53 (Note: Finally, 51 teams from 27 countries participated as two Israeli teams Hapoel Galil Elyon and Ironi Ness Ziona did not make the debut appearance because its games were suspended by FIBA Europe from regular season onwards in response to the Gaza war.) (from 27 countries)

Finals
- Champions: (German Basketball Federation) Niners Chemnitz (1st title)
- Runners-up: (Turkish Basketball Federation) Bahçeşehir Koleji
- Semi-finalists: (Italian Basketball Federation) Itelyum Varese (Spanish Basketball Federation) Surne Bilbao Basket
- Finals MVP: (Canada) Kaza Kajami-Keane

Statistical leaders
Points	(United States) Christian Vital	21.9
Rebounds	(United States) Travis Taylor	14.2
Assists	(Canada) Olivier Hanlan	9.0
Index Rating	(Canada) Olivier Hanlan	21.6

The 2023–24 FIBA Europe Cup was the 9th season of the FIBA Europe Cup, a European basketball competition for clubs launched by FIBA Europe. The season began on 18 October 2023 and ended on 24 April 2024.

For this season, the number of teams in regular season was increased from 32 to 40 teams. The finals were contested by German club Niners Chemnitz and Turkish club Bahçeşehir Koleji, with Chemnitz winning their first European and Europe Cup title.

Anwil Włocławek were the defending champions, but were eliminated in the regular season.

== Team allocation ==
A total of 53 teams from 27 of the 50 FIBA Europe member associations were expected to participate in the 2023–24 FIBA Europe Cup season, but finally 51 teams from 27 of the 50 FIBA Europe member associations participated in the competition. On July 20, 2023, FIBA Europe confirmed 35 teams to take part in the competition. On August 2, 2023, FIBA Europe confirmed the 21 teams of the Basketball Champions League qualifying rounds had opted in to participate in the FIBA Europe Cup in case they do not reach the Basketball Champions League regular season, out of which a maximum of 20 could join the regular season. On October 2, 2023, 18 of the 21 teams that had opted in to participate in the FIBA Europe Cup regular season joined from Basketball Champions League qualifying rounds after Benfica, Cholet and SIG Strasbourg qualified for the Basketball Champions League. On October 9, 2023, FIBA Europe suspended all games involving Israeli teams (Bnei Herzliya, Hapoel Galil Elyon, and Ironi Ness Ziona) from regular season onwards due to them being unable to host home games because of the Gaza war.

=== Teams ===
The labels in the parentheses show how each team qualified for the place of its starting round (TH: FIBA Europe Cup title holders):

- 1st, 2nd, 3rd, etc.: League position after eventual Playoffs
- CL QR: Transferred from Champions League qualifying rounds

Qualified teams for 2023–24 FIBA Europe Cup (by entry round)
Regular season
(Italian Basketball Federation) Happy Casa Brindisi (CL QR)	(Israeli Basketball Association) Ironi Ness Ziona (CL QR)	(Swedish Basketball Federation) Norrköping Dolphins (CL QR)	(Hungarian Basketball Federation) Arconic Alba Fehérvár (2nd)
(Italian Basketball Federation) Itelyium Varese (CL QR)	(Basketball Federation of Kosovo) Peja (CL QR)	(British Basketball) Caledonia Gladiators (CL QR)	(Israeli Basketball Association) Hapoel Galil Elyon (5th)
(Cyprus Basketball Federation) AEK Larnaca (CL QR)	(Lithuanian Basketball Federation) CBet Jonava (CL QR)	(Polish Basketball Federation) PGE Spójnia Stargard (5th)	(Basketball Nederland) ZZ Leiden (1st)
(Danish Basketball Association) Bakken Bears (CL QR)	(Basketball Federation of Montenegro) Mornar Barsko zlato (CL QR)	(Polish Basketball Federation) Anwil Włocłavek (7th)^{TH}	(Portuguese Basketball Federation) Sporting CP (2nd)
(Estonian Basketball Association) Kalev/Cramo (CL QR)	(Basketball Nederland) Heroes Den Bosch (CL QR)	(Bulgarian Basketball Federation) Balkan (1st)	(Romanian Basketball Federation) ABC Sibiu (3rd)
(Basketball Finland) Karhu (CL QR)	(Polish Basketball Federation) Legia Warsaw (CL QR)	(Czech Basketball Federation) ERA Nymburk (3rd)	(Spanish Basketball Federation) Surne Bilbao Basket (12th)
(Georgian Basketball Federation) TSU Tbilisi (CL QR)	(Romanian Basketball Federation) CSM Oradea (CL QR)	(French Federation of Basketball) Gravelines Dunkerque (10th)	(Turkish Basketball Federation) Bahçeşehir Koleji (9th)
(German Basketball Federation) Göttingen (CL QR)	(Slovak Basketball Association) Patrioti Levice (CL QR)	(German Basketball Federation) Niners Chemnitz (8th)	
Qualifying tournaments
(Cyprus Basketball Federation) Keravnos (2nd)	(Azerbaijan Basketball Federation) Sabah (1st)	(Hungarian Basketball Federation) Egis Körmend (3rd)	(Portuguese Basketball Federation) FC Porto (3rd)
(Cyprus Basketball Federation) Anorthosis Famagusta (4th)	(Bulgarian Basketball Federation) Chernomorets (2nd)	(Icelandic Basketball Association) Tindastóll (1st)	(Romanian Basketball Federation) Rapid București (4th)
(Basketball Federation of North Macedonia) Rabotnički (4th)	(Czech Basketball Federation) KVIS Pardubice (4th)	(Israeli Basketball Association) Bnei Herzliya (7th)	(Spanish Basketball Federation) Casademont Zaragoza (13th)
(Basketball Federation of North Macedonia) Feniks 2010 (7th)	(Estonian Basketball Association) Pärnu Sadam (3rd)	(Basketball Federation of Kosovo) Trepça (2nd)	(Turkish Basketball Federation) Manisa BB (11th)
(Swedish Basketball Federation) Borås Basket (2nd)	(Basketball Finland) Kataja (3rd)	(Lithuanian Basketball Federation) Nevėžis Optibet (8th)	
(Swedish Basketball Federation) Jämtland (3rd)	(German Basketball Federation) Rostock Seawolves (9th)	(Basketball Nederland) Donar (2nd)	

1. NOTE: On October 9, 2023, FIBA Europe suspended all games involving Israeli teams (Bnei Herzliya, Hapoel Galil Elyon, and Ironi Ness Ziona) from regular season onwards in response to the Gaza war.

== Schedule ==
The schedule of the competition is as follows.

Schedule for 2023–24 FIBA Europe Cup
Phase	Round	Draw date	First leg	Second leg
Qualifying tournaments		8 August 2023	2–5 October 2023	
Regular season	Round 1	8 August 2023	18 October 2023	
Regular season	Round 2	8 August 2023	25 October 2023	
Regular season	Round 3	8 August 2023	1 November 2023	
Regular season	Round 4	8 August 2023	8 November 2023	
Regular season	Round 5	8 August 2023	15 November 2023	
Regular season	Round 6	8 August 2023	22 November 2023	
Second round	Round 1	8 August 2023	6 December 2023	
Second round	Round 2	8 August 2023	13 December 2023	
Second round	Round 3	8 August 2023	10 January 2024	
Second round	Round 4	8 August 2023	24 January 2024	
Second round	Round 5	8 August 2023	31 January 2024	
Second round	Round 6	8 August 2023	7 February 2024	
Play-offs	Quarter-finals	8 August 2023	6 March 2024	13 March 2024
Play-offs	Semi-finals	8 August 2023	27 March 2024	3 April 2024
Play-offs	Finals	8 August 2023	17 April 2024	24 April 2024

== Qualifying tournaments ==
The qualifying tournaments took place from 2 to 5 October 2023 with six tournaments consisting of three teams, while one tournament will feature four teams. The winner of each tournament advanced to the regular season, which has been expanded for the 2023–24 season to feature 40 clubs split across 10 groups of four. As clubs that have opted in from the Basketball Champions League qualifying rounds could qualify to the Basketball Champions League regular season, this led to additional spots in the regular season of the FIBA Europe Cup opening up to be filled by the best ranked runners-up in the qualifying tournaments.

=== Qualifying tournament A ===
Pos	Team	Pld	W	L	PF	PA	PD	Pts	Qualification	SAB	RAP	DON	RAB
1	(Azerbaijan Basketball Federation) Sabah	3	3	0	248	224	+24	6	Advance to regular season	—	—	—	83–81
2	(Romanian Basketball Federation) Rapid București	3	2	1	227	212	+15	5		71–90	—	69–65	—
3	(Basketball Nederland) Donar	3	1	2	202	206	−4	4		72–75	—	—	65–62
4	(Basketball Federation of North Macedonia) Rabotnički (H)	3	0	3	200	235	−35	3		—	57–87	—	—

Source: FIBA Europe Cup
(H) Hosts

=== Qualifying tournament B ===
Pos	Team	Pld	W	L	PF	PA	PD	Pts	Qualification	MBB	POR	NEV
1	(Turkish Basketball Federation) Manisa BB (H)	2	2	0	178	158	+20	4	Advance to regular season	—	80–70	—
2	(Portuguese Basketball Federation) FC Porto	2	1	1	170	164	+6	3	Advance to regular season	—	—	100–84
3	(Lithuanian Basketball Federation) Nevėžis Optibet	2	0	2	172	198	−26	2		88–98	—	—

Source: FIBA Europe Cup
(H) Hosts

=== Qualifying tournament C ===
Pos	Team	Pld	W	L	PF	PA	PD	Pts	Qualification	TRE	TIN	PÄR
1	(Basketball Federation of Kosovo) Trepça	2	2	0	154	136	+18	4	Advance to regular season	—	—	77–67
2	(Icelandic Basketball Association) Tindastóll	2	1	1	138	139	−1	3		69–77	—	—
3	(Estonian Basketball Association) Pärnu Sadam (H)	2	0	2	129	146	−17	2		—	62–69	—

Source: FIBA Europe Cup
(H) Hosts

=== Qualifying tournament D ===
Pos	Team	Pld	W	L	PF	PA	PD	Pts	Qualification	KAT	BOR	CHE
1	(Basketball Finland) Kataja (H)	2	1	1	167	163	+4	3	Advance to regular season	—	71–78	—
2	(Swedish Basketball Federation) Borås Basket	2	1	1	183	180	+3	3		—	—	105–109
3	(Bulgarian Basketball Federation) Chernomorets	2	1	1	194	201	−7	3		85–96	—	—

Source: FIBA Europe Cup
(H) Hosts

=== Qualifying tournament E ===
Pos	Team	Pld	W	L	PF	PA	PD	Pts	Qualification	ROS	KER	FEN
1	(German Basketball Federation) Rostock Seawolves	2	2	0	194	146	+48	4	Advance to regular season	—	93–74	—
2	(Cyprus Basketball Federation) Keravnos (H)	2	1	1	181	153	+28	3	Advance to regular season	—	—	107–60
3	(Basketball Federation of North Macedonia) Feniks 2010	2	0	2	132	208	−76	2		72–101	—	—

Source: FIBA Europe Cup
(H) Hosts

=== Qualifying tournament F ===
Pos	Team	Pld	W	L	PF	PA	PD	Pts	Qualification	BNH	KÖR	ANO
1	(Israeli Basketball Association) Bnei Herzliya	2	2	0	184	151	+33	4	Advance to regular season	—	97–88	—
2	(Hungarian Basketball Federation) Egis Körmend (H)	2	1	1	179	184	−5	3		—	—	91–87
3	(Cyprus Basketball Federation) Anorthosis Famagusta	2	0	2	150	178	−28	2		63–87	—	—

Source: FIBA Europe Cup
(H) Hosts

=== Qualifying tournament G ===
Pos	Team	Pld	W	L	PF	PA	PD	Pts	Qualification	CAZ	JÄM	PAR
1	(Spanish Basketball Federation) Casademont Zaragoza	2	2	0	175	153	+22	4	Advance to regular season	—	—	94–88
2	(Swedish Basketball Federation) Jämtland (H)	2	1	1	142	157	−15	3		65–81	—	—
3	(Czech Basketball Federation) KVIS Pardubice	2	0	2	164	171	−7	2		—	76–77	—

Source: FIBA Europe Cup
(H) Hosts

==== Lucky losers ====
The additional spots were made available after French clubs Cholet and SIG Strasbourg both qualified for the Basketball Champions League. The two lucky losers were determined by the best ranked second-placed clubs from the FIBA Europe Cup Qualifying Tournaments in accordance to Section D of the Official Basketball Rules.

Pos	Grp	Team	Pld	W	L	PF	PA	PD	Pts	Qualification
1	E	(Cyprus Basketball Federation) Keravnos	2	1	1	181	153	+28	3	Advance to regular season
2	B	(Portuguese Basketball Federation) FC Porto	2	1	1	170	164	+6	3	Advance to regular season
3	D	(Swedish Basketball Federation) Borås Basket	2	1	1	183	180	+3	3	
4	C	(Icelandic Basketball Association) Tindastóll	2	1	1	138	139	−1	3	
5	F	(Hungarian Basketball Federation) Egis Körmend	2	1	1	179	184	−5	3	
6	G	(Swedish Basketball Federation) Jämtland	2	1	1	142	157	−15	3	
7	A	(Romanian Basketball Federation) Rapid București	2	1	1	140	155	−15	3	

Source: FIBA Europe Cup

== Regular season ==
The regular season was expanded with eight teams, from 32 to 40, which were divided in 10 groups of four.

=== Group A ===
Pos	Team	Pld	W	L	PF	PA	PD	Pts	Qualification	BAL	SPO	ALB	BNH
1	(Bulgarian Basketball Federation) Balkan	4	3	1	326	317	+9	7	Advance to second round	—	81–70	85–79	—
2	(Portuguese Basketball Federation) Sporting CP	4	2	2	345	338	+7	6	Advance to second round	90–72	—	83–79	—
3	(Hungarian Basketball Federation) Arconic Alba Fehérvár	4	1	3	342	358	−16	5		78–88	106–102	—	—
4	(Israeli Basketball Association) Bnei Herzliya	0	0	0	0	0	0	0	Withdrawal	—	—	—	—

Source: FIBA Europe Cup
Legend: Blue = home team win; Red = away team win.

=== Group B ===
Pos	Team	Pld	W	L	PF	PA	PD	Pts	Qualification	SBB	ANW	CAL	SIB
1	(Spanish Basketball Federation) Surne Bilbao Basket	6	6	0	505	399	+106	12	Advance to second round	—	76–71	106–58	89–64
2	(Polish Basketball Federation) Anwil Włocłavek	6	3	3	469	409	+60	9		79–83	—	93–72	84–71
3	(British Basketball) Caledonia Gladiators	6	3	3	431	475	−44	9		59–78	66–63	—	96–67
4	(Romanian Basketball Federation) ABC Sibiu	6	0	6	379	501	−122	6		68–73	41–79	68–80	—

Source: FIBA Europe Cup
Legend: Blue = home team win; Red = away team win.

=== Group C ===
Pos	Team	Pld	W	L	PF	PA	PD	Pts	Qualification	JSK	ROS	AEK	KAU
1	(Lithuanian Basketball Federation) CBet Jonava	6	4	2	542	504	+38	10	Advance to second round	—	84–65	80–87	98–94
2	(German Basketball Federation) Rostock Seawolves	6	4	2	504	473	+31	10		86–81	—	86–73	93–65
3	(Cyprus Basketball Federation) AEK Larnaca	6	3	3	473	492	−19	9		84–95	78–76	—	66–75
4	(Basketball Finland) Karhu	6	1	5	494	544	−50	7		88–104	92–98	80–85	—

Source: FIBA Europe Cup
Legend: Blue = home team win; Red = away team win.

=== Group D ===
Pos	Team	Pld	W	L	PF	PA	PD	Pts	Qualification	BAH	NYM	SAB	MOR
1	(Turkish Basketball Federation) Bahçeşehir Koleji	6	5	1	547	464	+83	11	Advance to second round	—	88–89	99–80	103–68
2	(Czech Basketball Federation) ERA Nymburk	6	5	1	547	472	+75	11	Advance to second round	91–96	—	95–61	78–62
3	(Azerbaijan Basketball Federation) Sabah	6	1	5	451	528	−77	7		65–83	89–97	—	81–74
4	(Basketball Federation of Montenegro) Mornar Barsko zlato	6	1	5	431	512	−81	7		71–78	76–97	80–75	—

Source: FIBA Europe Cup
Legend: Blue = home team win; Red = away team win.

=== Group E ===
Pos	Team	Pld	W	L	PF	PA	PD	Pts	Qualification	MBB	POR	BAK	NOR
1	(Turkish Basketball Federation) Manisa BB	6	5	1	478	435	+43	11	Advance to second round	—	75–66	85–80	79–52
2	(Portuguese Basketball Federation) FC Porto	6	4	2	501	468	+33	10	Advance to second round	84–67	—	89–78	84–64
3	(Danish Basketball Association) Bakken Bears	6	2	4	505	512	−7	8		76–82	113–99	—	69–75
4	(Swedish Basketball Federation) Norrköping Dolphins	6	1	5	421	490	−69	7		77–90	71–79	82–89	—

Source: FIBA Europe Cup
Legend: Blue = home team win; Red = away team win.

=== Group F ===
Pos	Team	Pld	W	L	PF	PA	PD	Pts	Qualification	CAZ	KAL	BRI	INZ
1	(Spanish Basketball Federation) Casademont Zaragoza	4	3	1	331	309	+22	7	Advance to second round	—	71–78	91–72	—
2	(Estonian Basketball Association) Kalev/Cramo	4	2	2	295	301	−6	6		72–78	—	76–70	—
3	(Italian Basketball Federation) Happy Casa Brindisi	4	1	3	311	327	−16	5		87–91	82–69	—	—
4	(Israeli Basketball Association) Ironi Ness Ziona	0	0	0	0	0	0	0	Withdrawal	—	—	—	—

Source: FIBA Europe Cup
Legend: Blue = home team win; Red = away team win.

=== Group G ===
Pos	Team	Pld	W	L	PF	PA	PD	Pts	Qualification	LEI	GRA	TRE	HGE
1	(Basketball Nederland) ZZ Leiden	4	3	1	287	273	+14	7	Advance to second round	—	77–69	80–76	—
2	(French Federation of Basketball) Gravelines Dunkerque	4	2	2	294	248	+46	6	Advance to second round	74–46	—	83–49	—
3	(Basketball Federation of Kosovo) Trepça	4	1	3	255	315	−60	5		54–84	76–68	—	—
4	(Israeli Basketball Association) Hapoel Galil Elyon	0	0	0	0	0	0	0	Withdrawal	—	—	—	—

Source: FIBA Europe Cup
Legend: Blue = home team win; Red = away team win.

=== Group H ===
Pos	Team	Pld	W	L	PF	PA	PD	Pts	Qualification	CHE	SPÓ	PEJ	HDB
1	(German Basketball Federation) Niners Chemnitz	6	6	0	543	403	+140	12	Advance to second round	—	97–75	98–72	88–61
2	(Polish Basketball Federation) PGE Spójnia Stargard	6	3	3	476	505	−29	9		66–84	—	79–83	73–65
3	(Basketball Federation of Kosovo) Peja	6	2	4	495	560	−65	8		63–99	87–91	—	99–84
4	(Basketball Nederland) Heroes Den Bosch	6	1	5	474	520	−46	7		66–77	89–92	109–91	—

Source: FIBA Europe Cup
Legend: Blue = home team win; Red = away team win.

=== Group I ===
Pos	Team	Pld	W	L	PF	PA	PD	Pts	Qualification	GÖT	VAR	KER	TBI
1	(German Basketball Federation) Göttingen	6	5	1	559	494	+65	11	Advance to second round	—	104–109	90–71	86–81
2	(Italian Basketball Federation) Itelyum Varese	6	5	1	583	529	+54	11	Advance to second round	79–91	—	97–90	109–83
3	(Cyprus Basketball Federation) Keravnos	6	1	5	454	526	−72	7		69–102	80–95	—	84–79
4	(Georgian Basketball Federation) TSU Tbilisi	6	1	5	472	519	−47	7		85–86	81–94	63–60	—

Source: FIBA Europe Cup
Legend: Blue = home team win; Red = away team win.

=== Group J ===
Pos	Team	Pld	W	L	PF	PA	PD	Pts	Qualification	LEG	ORA	LEV	KAT
1	(Polish Basketball Federation) Legia Warsaw	6	5	1	498	459	+39	11	Advance to second round	—	90–79	74–63	85–62
2	(Romanian Basketball Federation) CSM Oradea	6	4	2	537	487	+50	10	Advance to second round	93–74	—	91–93	105–92
3	(Slovak Basketball Association) Patrioti Levice	6	2	4	449	480	−31	8		77–86	65–82	—	68–55
4	(Basketball Finland) Kataja	6	1	5	459	517	−58	7		85–89	73–87	92–83	—

Source: FIBA Europe Cup
Legend: Blue = home team win; Red = away team win.

=== Ranking of second-placed teams ===
Pos	Grp	Team	Pld	W	L	PF	PA	PD	Pts	Qualification
1	D	(Czech Basketball Federation) ERA Nymburk	4	3	1	372	334	+38	7	Advance to second round
2	I	(Italian Basketball Federation) Itelyum Varese	4	3	1	380	365	+15	7	Advance to second round
3	G	(French Federation of Basketball) Gravelines Dunkerque	4	2	2	294	248	+46	6	Advance to second round
4	J	(Romanian Basketball Federation) CSM Oradea	4	2	2	345	322	+23	6	Advance to second round
5	A	(Portuguese Basketball Federation) Sporting CP	4	2	2	345	338	+7	6	Advance to second round
6	E	(Portuguese Basketball Federation) FC Porto	4	2	2	338	333	+5	6	Advance to second round
7	C	(German Basketball Federation) Rostock Seawolves	4	2	2	313	316	−3	6	
8	F	(Estonian Basketball Association) Kalev/Cramo	4	2	2	295	301	−6	6	
9	B	(Polish Basketball Federation) Anwil Włocłavek	4	1	3	306	297	+9	5	
10	H	(Polish Basketball Federation) PGE Spójnia Stargard	4	1	3	311	351	−40	5	

Source: FIBA Europe Cup

== Second round ==
=== Group K ===
Pos	Team	Pld	W	L	PF	PA	PD	Pts	Qualification	SBB	POR	GÖT	BAL
1	(Spanish Basketball Federation) Surne Bilbao Basket	6	5	1	504	438	+66	11	Advance to quarter-finals	—	90–86	75–73	90–63
2	(Portuguese Basketball Federation) FC Porto	6	4	2	507	453	+54	10	Advance to quarter-finals	72–75	—	82–64	92–80
3	(German Basketball Federation) Göttingen	6	3	3	477	469	+8	9		82–80	81–87	—	76–70
4	(Bulgarian Basketball Federation) Balkan	6	0	6	413	541	−128	6		62–94	63–88	75–101	—

Source: FIBA Europe Cup
Legend: Blue = home team win; Red = away team win.

=== Group L ===
Pos	Team	Pld	W	L	PF	PA	PD	Pts	Qualification	BAH	LEG	SPO	JSK
1	(Turkish Basketball Federation) Bahçeşehir Koleji	6	6	0	568	456	+112	12	Advance to quarter-finals	—	100–90	99–87	119–79
2	(Polish Basketball Federation) Legia Warsaw	6	4	2	560	496	+64	10	Advance to quarter-finals	66–77	—	93–84	111–72
3	(Portuguese Basketball Federation) Sporting CP	6	2	4	518	542	−24	8		67–82	86–99	—	103–88
4	(Lithuanian Basketball Federation) CBet Jonava	6	0	6	464	616	−152	6		67–91	77–101	81–91	—

Source: FIBA Europe Cup
Legend: Blue = home team win; Red = away team win.

=== Group M ===
Pos	Team	Pld	W	L	PF	PA	PD	Pts	Qualification	NYM	CAZ	GRA	MBB
1	(Czech Basketball Federation) ERA Nymburk	6	4	2	445	394	+51	10	Advance to quarter-finals	—	70–64	72–57	84–62
2	(Spanish Basketball Federation) Casademont Zaragoza	6	4	2	472	445	+27	10	Advance to quarter-finals	82–79	—	101–90	88–71
3	(French Federation of Basketball) Gravelines Dunkerque	6	3	3	442	460	−18	9		74–71	70–69	—	73–80
4	(Turkish Basketball Federation) Manisa BB	6	1	5	400	460	−60	7		55–69	65–68	67–78	—

Source: FIBA Europe Cup
Legend: Blue = home team win; Red = away team win.

=== Group N ===
Pos	Team	Pld	W	L	PF	PA	PD	Pts	Qualification	CHE	VAR	ORA	LEI
1	(German Basketball Federation) Niners Chemnitz	6	5	1	549	467	+82	11	Advance to quarter-finals	—	109–85	101–98	78–57
2	(Italian Basketball Federation) Itelyum Varese	6	3	3	534	527	+7	9	Advance to quarter-finals	90–78	—	100–81	79–82
3	(Romanian Basketball Federation) CSM Oradea	6	2	4	526	553	−27	8		79–95	96–103	—	90–77
4	(Basketball Nederland) ZZ Leiden	6	2	4	432	494	−62	8		58–88	81–77	77–82	—

Source: FIBA Europe Cup
Legend: Blue = home team win; Red = away team win.

== Play-offs ==
The play-offs began on 6 March and concluded on 17 and 24 April 2024 with the Finals.

Quarter-finals
(German Basketball Federation) Niners Chemnitz	98	102	200
(Spanish Basketball Federation) Casademont Zaragoza	64	86	150
(Spanish Basketball Federation) Surne Bilbao Basket	64	81	145
(Polish Basketball Federation) Legia Warsaw	83	53	136
(Turkish Basketball Federation) Bahçeşehir Koleji	80	88	168
(Portuguese Basketball Federation) FC Porto	90	52	142
(Czech Basketball Federation) ERA Nymburk	65	76	141
(Italian Basketball Federation) Itelyum Varese	80	91	171

Semi-finals
(German Basketball Federation) Niners Chemnitz	98	73	171
(Spanish Basketball Federation) Surne Bilbao Basket	73	82	155
(Turkish Basketball Federation) Bahçeşehir Koleji	80	81	161
(Italian Basketball Federation) Itelyum Varese	81	73	154

Finals
(German Basketball Federation) Niners Chemnitz	85	95	180
(Turkish Basketball Federation) Bahçeşehir Koleji	74	105	179

=== Quarter-finals ===
The first legs were played on 6 March, and the second legs were played on 13 March 2024.

Team 1	Agg.	Team 2	1st leg	2nd leg
Surne Bilbao Basket (Spain)	145–136	(Poland) Legia Warsaw	64–83	81–53
Bahçeşehir Koleji (Turkey)	168–142	(Portugal) FC Porto	80–90	88–52
ERA Nymburk (Czech Republic)	141–171	(Italy) Itelyum Varese	65–80	76–91
Niners Chemnitz (Germany)	200–150	(Spain) Casademont Zaragoza	98–64	102–86

=== Semi-finals ===
The first legs were played on 27 March, and the second legs were played on 3 April 2024.

Team 1	Agg.	Team 2	1st leg	2nd leg
Niners Chemnitz (Germany)	171–155	(Spain) Surne Bilbao Basket	98–73	73–82
Bahçeşehir Koleji (Turkey)	161–154	(Italy) Itelyum Varese	80–81	81–73

=== Finals ===
The first leg was played on 17 April, and the second leg was played on 24 April 2024.

Team 1	Agg.	Team 2	1st leg	2nd leg
Niners Chemnitz (Germany)	180–179	(Turkey) Bahçeşehir Koleji	85–74	95–105

== Finals rosters ==
(Germany) Niners Chemnitz: Lansdowne, Garrett, Kajami-Keane, Krubally, Jonas Richter (C). Coach: Rodrigo Pastore
(Turkey) Bahçeşehir Koleji: Bouteille, Cavanaugh (C), Taylor, Boutsiele, Scrubb. Coach: Dejan Radonjić

== Individual awards ==
=== FIBA Europe Cup Final MVP ===
Player	Team	Ref.
(Canada) Kaza Kajami-Keane	(German Basketball Federation) Niners Chemnitz	

=== MVP of the Month ===
Month	Player	Club	Ref.
2023
October	(United States) Willie Cauley-Stein	(Italy) Pallacanestro Varese	
November	(Canada) Olivier Hanlan	(Italy) Pallacanestro Varese	
December	(Canada) Philip Scrubb	(Turkey) Bahçeşehir Koleji	
2024
January	(United States) Christian Vital	(Poland) Legia Warsaw	
February	(United States) Christian Vital	(Poland) Legia Warsaw	
March	(United States) Jeff Garrett	(Germany) Niners Chemnitz	

== See also ==
- 2023–24 EuroLeague
- 2023–24 EuroCup Basketball
- 2023–24 Basketball Champions League
