= 2025–26 FIBA Europe Cup =

European basketball competition

- Season: 2025–26
- Dates: Qualifying: 24 September – 1 October 2025; Competition proper: 14 October 2025 – 29 April 2026
- Teams: Competition proper: 40 (from 12 countries); Total: 47 (from 19 countries)

Finals
- Champions: (Spanish Basketball Federation) Surne Bilbao Basket (2nd title)
- Runners-up: (Hellenic Basketball Federation) PAOK mateco
- Semi-finalists: (Hungarian Basketball Federation) Falco Szombathely (Spanish Basketball Federation) UCAM Murcia
- Finals MVP: (United States) Darrun Hilliard

Statistical leaders
Points	(Hungary) Zoltán Perl	18.7
Rebounds	(United States) Jake Van Tubbergen	7.9
Assists	(Sweden) Melwin Pantzar	6.4
Efficiency	(Netherlands) Yannick Franke	18.9

The 2025–26 FIBA Europe Cup was the 11th season of the FIBA Europe Cup, a European basketball competition for clubs launched by FIBA Europe.

Bilbao Basket are the defending champions, and will defend their title in the competition.

== Team allocation ==
A total of 47 teams from 19 of the 50 FIBA Europe member associations will be expected to participate in the 2024–25 FIBA Europe Cup season. The official list of teams were announced by FIBA on 11 July 2025.

After the release of the teams, Rīgas Zeļļi from Latvia withdrew from the qualifying round, which led to the automatic placement in the regular season of Peristeri, based on the Club Competition Rankings.

=== Teams ===
The labels in the parentheses show how each team qualified for the place of its starting round:

- 1st, 2nd, 3rd, etc.: League position after eventual Playoffs
- CL QR: Transferred from Champions League qualifying rounds
- TH: Title holders

Qualified teams for 2025–26 FIBA Europe Cup (by entry round)
Regular season
(Spanish Basketball Federation) Surne Bilbao Basket^{TH} (16th)	(Italian Basketball Federation) Pallacanestro Reggiana (CL QR)	(Croatian Basketball Federation) Cedevita Junior (5th)
(Spanish Basketball Federation) UCAM Murcia (CL QR)	(Italian Basketball Federation) Dinamo Sassari (10th)	(Danish Basketball Association) Bakken Bears (CL QR)
(Spanish Basketball Federation) Casademont Zaragoza (12th)	(Polish Basketball Federation) Start Lublin (CL QR)	(French Federation of Basketball) JDA Dijon (8th)
(Cyprus Basketball Federation) Petrolina AEK Larnaca (CL QR)	(Polish Basketball Federation) Energa Trefl Sopot (3rd)	(Georgian Basketball Federation) Kutaisi 2010 (CL QR)
(Cyprus Basketball Federation) Keravnos (2nd)	(Portuguese Basketball Federation) Porto (CL QR)	(Hungarian Basketball Federation) Falco Szombathely (CL QR)
(Estonian Basketball Association) Kalev/Cramo (CL QR)	(Portuguese Basketball Federation) Sporting CP (3rd)	(Turkish Basketball Federation) Petkim Spor (11th)
(Estonian Basketball Association) University of Tartu (2nd)	(Romanian Basketball Federation) CSM CSU Raiffeisen Oradea (CL QR)	(Basketball Federation of Kosovo) Trepça (CL QR)
(German Basketball Federation) Löwen Braunschweig (CL QR)	(Romanian Basketball Federation) Vâlcea 1924 (3rd)	(Basketball Federation of North Macedonia) Pelister (CL QR)
(German Basketball Federation) Rostock Seawolves (10th)	(Azerbaijan Basketball Federation) Neftçi İK (2nd)	
(Hellenic Basketball Federation) PAOK (CL QR)	(Basketball Belgium) Windrose Giants Antwerp (CL QR)	
(Hellenic Basketball Federation) Peristeri (8th) (Note: Peristeri was initially allocated in the qualifying rounds, but following the withdrawal of Riga Zelli were given a direct regular season spot.)	(Bulgarian Basketball Federation) Rilski Sportist (CL QR)	
Qualifying round
(Basketball Belgium) Kangoeroes Mechelen (2nd)	(Polish Basketball Federation) Anwil Wloclawek (4th)	(Croatian Basketball Federation) Cibona (3rd)
(Bulgarian Basketball Federation) Balkan (3rd)	(Slovak Basketball Association) Prievidza (3rd)	(Czech Basketball Federation) PUMPA Basket Brno (2nd)
(Cyprus Basketball Federation) Anorthosis Famagusta (3rd)	(Basketball Federation of Ukraine) Dnipro (1st)	(German Basketball Federation) Rasta Vechta (12th)
(Estonian Basketball Association) Transcom Pärnu (5th)	(Azerbaijan Basketball Federation) Absheron Lions (3rd)	(Basketball Federation of Kosovo) Bashkimi (2nd)
(Romanian Basketball Federation) Corona Brașov (5th)	(Basketball Federation of Bosnia and Herzegovina) Bosna BH Telecom (2nd)	~~(Latvian Basketball Association) Rīgas Zeļļi (3rd)~~ (Note: Peristeri was initially allocated in the qualifying rounds, but following the withdrawal of Riga Zelli were given a direct regular season spot.)

== Draw ==
The draw for both the qualifying rounds and regular season was held on 23 July 2025 in Munich, Germany.

== Qualifying round ==
The qualifying round took place on 24 September and 1 October 2025 in two-legged ties in which the series winners advanced to the regular season.

Team 1	Agg.	Team 2	1st leg	2nd leg
Absheron Lions (Azerbaijan Basketball Federation)	149–150	(Cyprus Basketball Federation) Anorthosis Famagusta	89–73	60–77
Bashkimi (Basketball Federation of Kosovo)	151–168	(Polish Basketball Federation) Anwil Włocławek	80–75	71–93
Bosna (Basketball Federation of Bosnia and Herzegovina)	164–139	(Basketball Belgium) Kangoeroes Mechelen	82–57	82–82
Rasta Vechta (German Basketball Federation)	165–142	(Bulgarian Basketball Federation) Balkan	79–63	86–79
Cibona (Croatian Basketball Federation)	185–184	(Slovak Basketball Association) Prievidza	91–83	94–101
Corona Brașov (Romanian Basketball Federation)	178–133	(Basketball Federation of Ukraine) Dnipro	83–69	95–64
Brno (Czech Basketball Federation)	164–144	(Estonian Basketball Association) Transcom Pärnu	83–75	81–69

=== Lucky losers ===
The additional spots were made available after Patrioti Levice, Bursaspor and Élan Chalon qualified for the Basketball Champions League. The three lucky losers were determined by the best loser series from the FIBA Europe Cup Qualifying Round in accordance to Section D of the Official Basketball Rules.

Pos	Team	PF	PA	PD	Qualification
1	(Slovak Basketball Association) Prievidza	184	185	−1	Advance to regular season
2	(Azerbaijan Basketball Federation) Absheron Lions	149	150	−1	Advance to regular season
3	(Basketball Federation of Kosovo) Bashkimi	151	168	−17	Advance to regular season
4	(Estonian Basketball Association) Transcom Pärnu	144	164	−20	
5	(Bulgarian Basketball Federation) Balkan	142	165	−23	
6	(Basketball Belgium) Kangoeroes Mechelen	139	164	−25	
7	(Basketball Federation of Ukraine) Dnipro	133	178	−45	

Source: FIBA

== Regular season ==
The regular season was played by 40 teams divided into 10 groups of four in which 14 teams received direct spots, 10 teams advanced from the qualifying round and 16 teams came from the Basketball Champions League qualifying rounds. It began on 14 October 2025 and concluded on 19 November 2025. In each group, teams were played against each other home-and-away in a round-robin format. And the end of the regular season, the top team from each regular season group plus the best six second-placed teams will advance to the second round, while the rest of the teams will be eliminated after the regular season.

Vâlcea 1924 and Neftçi İK will make their debut appearances in a European competition.

No team from Israel participated in the competition for the third season in-a-row.

=== Group A ===
Pos	Team	Pld	W	L	PF	PA	PD	Pts	Qualification	MUR	BOS	LUB	RIL
1	(Spanish Basketball Federation) UCAM Murcia	6	5	1	507	424	+83	11	Advance to second round	—	87–63	80–75	77–63
2	(Basketball Federation of Bosnia and Herzegovina) Bosna BH Telecom	6	4	2	465	439	+26	10	Advance to second round	87–72	—	79–70	91–64
3	(Polish Basketball Federation) Start Lublin	6	2	4	478	509	−31	8		75–102	90–80	—	76–73
4	(Bulgarian Basketball Federation) Rilski Sportist	6	1	5	412	490	−78	7		61–89	56–65	95–92	—

Source: FIBA
Legend: Blue = home team win; Red = away team win.

=== Group B ===
Pos	Team	Pld	W	L	PF	PA	PD	Pts	Qualification	ROS	ANT	TAR	PRT
1	(German Basketball Federation) Rostock Seawolves	6	5	1	535	457	+78	11	Advance to second round	—	95–80	100–82	96–68
2	(Basketball Belgium) Windrose Giants Antwerp	6	3	3	504	476	+28	9		63–75	—	110–73	81–72
3	(Estonian Basketball Association) University of Tartu	6	2	4	497	544	−47	8		77–94	81–91	—	94–78
4	(Portuguese Basketball Federation) Porto	6	2	4	456	515	−59	8		87–75	80–79	71–90	—

Source: FIBA
Legend: Blue = home team win; Red = away team win.

=== Group C ===
Pos	Team	Pld	W	L	PF	PA	PD	Pts	Qualification	CSM	PET	AEK	COR
1	(Romanian Basketball Federation) CSM CSU Raiffeisen Oradea	6	5	1	505	466	+39	11	Advance to second round	—	77–71	89–75	87–65
2	(Turkish Basketball Federation) Petkim Spor	6	4	2	516	439	+77	10	Advance to second round	84–73	—	101–58	85–74
3	(Cyprus Basketball Federation) Petrolina AEK	6	3	3	486	508	−22	9		86–89	84–78	—	93–68
4	(Romanian Basketball Federation) Corona Brașov	6	0	6	448	542	−94	6		85–90	73–97	83–90	—

Source: FIBA
Legend: Blue = home team win; Red = away team win.

=== Group D ===
Pos	Team	Pld	W	L	PF	PA	PD	Pts	Qualification	CED	PRI	KER	PEL
1	(Croatian Basketball Federation) Cedevita Junior	6	5	1	531	468	+63	11	Advance to second round	—	88–85	85–68	94–76
2	(Slovak Basketball Association) Prievidza	6	4	2	539	451	+88	10	Advance to second round	83–64	—	82–68	97–82
3	(Cyprus Basketball Federation) Keravnos	6	2	4	468	541	−73	8		82–105	59–109	—	99–86
4	(Basketball Federation of North Macedonia) Pelister	6	1	5	482	560	−78	7		74–95	90–83	74–92	—

Source: FIBA
Legend: Blue = home team win; Red = away team win.

=== Group E ===
Pos	Team	Pld	W	L	PF	PA	PD	Pts	Qualification	BIL	PRS	BRN	KUT
1	(Spanish Basketball Federation) Surne Bilbao Basket	6	5	1	617	415	+202	11	Advance to second round	—	81–84	115–100	117–54
2	(Hellenic Basketball Federation) Peristeri	6	5	1	525	435	+90	11	Advance to second round	64–86	—	87–75	102–67
3	(Czech Basketball Federation) PUMPA Basket Brno	6	1	5	456	540	−84	7		51–105	73–87	—	73–80
4	(Georgian Basketball Federation) Kutaisi 2010	6	1	5	382	590	−208	7		62–113	53–101	66–84	—

Source: FIBA
Legend: Blue = home team win; Red = away team win.

=== Group F ===
Pos	Team	Pld	W	L	PF	PA	PD	Pts	Qualification	PAK	LOW	WLO	TRP
1	(Hellenic Basketball Federation) PAOK	6	5	1	527	513	+14	11	Advance to second round	—	88–87	104–96	85–74
2	(German Basketball Federation) Löwen Braunschweig	6	4	2	502	488	+14	10		88–79	—	98–97	80–70
3	(Polish Basketball Federation) Anwil Wloclawek	6	3	3	563	526	+37	9		93–94	84–65	—	96–78
4	(Basketball Federation of Kosovo) Trepça	6	0	6	454	519	−65	6		75–77	70–84	87–97	—

Source: FIBA
Legend: Blue = home team win; Red = away team win.

=== Group G ===
Pos	Team	Pld	W	L	PF	PA	PD	Pts	Qualification	SAS	SCP	RAS	VAL
1	(Italian Basketball Federation) Dinamo Sassari	6	4	2	535	461	+74	10	Advance to second round	—	89–72	105–94	94–73
2	(Portuguese Basketball Federation) Sporting CP	6	4	2	535	467	+68	10	Advance to second round	80–77	—	78–75	121–67
3	(German Basketball Federation) Rasta Vechta	6	3	3	523	500	+23	9		77–73	98–82	—	88–90
4	(Romanian Basketball Federation) Vâlcea 1924	6	1	5	428	593	−165	7		65–97	61–102	72–91	—

Source: FIBA
Legend: Blue = home team win; Red = away team win.

=== Group H ===
Pos	Team	Pld	W	L	PF	PA	PD	Pts	Qualification	ZAR	FAL	BAK	FAM
1	(Spanish Basketball Federation) Casademont Zaragoza	6	5	1	571	449	+122	11	Advance to second round	—	97–82	105–75	89–61
2	(Hungarian Basketball Federation) Falco Szombathely	6	4	2	514	477	+37	10	Advance to second round	74–90	—	83–76	98–56
3	(Danish Basketball Association) Bakken Bears	6	2	4	514	519	−5	8		90–78	79–90	—	94–102
4	(Cyprus Basketball Federation) Anorthosis Famagusta	6	1	5	426	580	−154	7		67–112	79–87	61–100	—

Source: FIBA
Legend: Blue = home team win; Red = away team win.

=== Group I ===
Pos	Team	Pld	W	L	PF	PA	PD	Pts	Qualification	SOP	NEF	KAL	LIO
1	(Polish Basketball Federation) Energa Trefl Sopot	6	4	2	552	488	+64	10	Advance to second round	—	92–63	93–58	98–78
2	(Azerbaijan Basketball Federation) Neftçi İK	6	3	3	522	532	−10	9		92–87	—	95–84	86–95
3	(Estonian Basketball Association) Kalev/Cramo	6	3	3	495	539	−44	9		101–83	88–82	—	71–101
4	(Azerbaijan Basketball Federation) Absheron Lions	6	2	4	541	551	−10	8		96–99	86–104	85–93	—

Source: FIBA
Legend: Blue = home team win; Red = away team win.

=== Group J ===
Pos	Team	Pld	W	L	PF	PA	PD	Pts	Qualification	REG	JDA	CIB	BAS
1	(Italian Basketball Federation) Pallacanestro Reggiana	6	3	3	494	449	+45	9	Advance to second round	—	76–79	73–75	100–65
2	(French Federation of Basketball) JDA Dijon	6	3	3	501	500	+1	9		88–96	—	94–85	84–93
3	(Croatian Basketball Federation) Cibona	6	3	3	463	481	−18	9		65–73	76–73	—	93–79
4	(Basketball Federation of Kosovo) Bashkimi	6	3	3	477	505	−28	9		77–76	74–83	89–69	—

Source: FIBA
Legend: Blue = home team win; Red = away team win.

=== Ranking of second-placed teams ===
Pos	Grp	Team	Pld	W	L	PF	PA	PD	Pts	Qualification
1	E	(Hellenic Basketball Federation) Peristeri	6	5	1	525	435	+90	11	Advance to second round
2	D	(Slovak Basketball Association) Prievidza	6	4	2	539	451	+88	10	Advance to second round
3	C	(Turkish Basketball Federation) Petkim Spor	6	4	2	516	439	+77	10	Advance to second round
4	G	(Portuguese Basketball Federation) Sporting CP	6	4	2	535	467	+68	10	Advance to second round
5	H	(Hungarian Basketball Federation) Falco Szombathely	6	4	2	514	477	+37	10	Advance to second round
6	A	(Basketball Federation of Bosnia and Herzegovina) Bosna BH Telecom	6	4	2	465	439	+26	10	Advance to second round
7	F	(German Basketball Federation) Löwen Braunschweig	6	4	2	502	488	+14	10	
8	B	(Basketball Belgium) Windrose Giants Antwerp	6	3	3	504	476	+28	9	
9	J	(French Federation of Basketball) JDA Dijon	6	3	3	501	500	+1	9	
10	I	(Azerbaijan Basketball Federation) Neftçi İK	6	3	3	522	532	−10	9	

Source: FIBA

== Second round ==
It began on 10 December 2025 and will conclude on 11 February 2026. In each group, teams will play against each other home-and-away in a round-robin format. At the end of the second round, the top two teams from each regular season group will advance to the quarter-finals, while the rest of the teams will be eliminated.

=== Group K ===
Pos	Team	Pld	W	L	PF	PA	PD	Pts	Qualification	MUR	FAL	ROS	SOP
1	(Spanish Basketball Federation) UCAM Murcia	6	6	0	536	444	+92	12	Advance to quarter-finals	—	97–67	85–77	92–66
2	(Hungarian Basketball Federation) Falco Szombathely	6	3	3	466	489	−23	9	Advance to quarter-finals	75–80	—	77–84	83–74
3	(German Basketball Federation) Rostock Seawolves	6	2	4	489	484	+5	8		82–89	75–78	—	97–72
4	(Polish Basketball Federation) Energa Trefl Sopot	6	1	5	451	525	−74	7		77–93	79–86	83–74	—

Source: FIBA
Legend: Blue = home team win; Red = away team win.

=== Group L ===
Pos	Team	Pld	W	L	PF	PA	PD	Pts	Qualification	BOS	REG	CSM	CED
1	(Basketball Federation of Bosnia and Herzegovina) Bosna BH Telecom	6	5	1	483	467	+16	11	Advance to quarter-finals	—	85–71	76–63	85–82
2	(Italian Basketball Federation) Pallacanestro Reggiana	6	4	2	508	442	+66	10	Advance to quarter-finals	93–67	—	90–59	83–60
3	(Romanian Basketball Federation) CSM CSU Raiffeisen Oradea	6	3	3	492	506	−14	9		79–84	81–77	—	103–79
4	(Croatian Basketball Federation) Cedevita Junior	6	0	6	490	558	−68	6		79–86	90–94	100–107	—

Source: FIBA
Legend: Blue = home team win; Red = away team win.

=== Group M ===
Pos	Team	Pld	W	L	PF	PA	PD	Pts	Qualification	BIL	PAK	SCP	PRI
1	(Spanish Basketball Federation) Surne Bilbao Basket	6	6	0	543	408	+135	12	Advance to quarter-finals	—	95–73	94–79	93–51
2	(Hellenic Basketball Federation) PAOK	6	4	2	519	449	+70	10	Advance to quarter-finals	87–88	—	101–67	101–70
3	(Portuguese Basketball Federation) Sporting CP	6	1	5	454	522	−68	7		72–90	62–70	—	92–73
4	(Slovak Basketball Association) BC Prievidza	6	1	5	401	538	−137	7		46–83	67–87	94–82	—

Source: FIBA
Legend: Blue = home team win; Red = away team win.

=== Group N ===
Pos	Team	Pld	W	L	PF	PA	PD	Pts	Qualification	PRS	PET	ZAR	SAS
1	(Hellenic Basketball Federation) Peristeri	6	5	1	505	477	+28	11	Advance to quarter-finals	—	61–82	86–70	98–84
2	(Turkish Basketball Federation) Petkim Spor	6	4	2	494	441	+53	10	Advance to quarter-finals	85–87	—	98–75	82–70
3	(Spanish Basketball Federation) Casademont Zaragoza	6	2	4	463	491	−28	8		80–92	76–71	—	68–69
4	(Italian Basketball Federation) Dinamo Sassari	6	1	5	446	499	−53	7		76–81	72–76	75–94	—

Source: FIBA
Legend: Blue = home team win; Red = away team win.

== Play-offs ==
The play-offs will begin on 11 March and was conclude on 22–29 April 2026 with the finals. In the play-offs, teams played against each other over two legs on a home-and-away basis.

Quarter-finals
(Spanish Basketball Federation) UCAM Murcia	85	77	162
(Italian Basketball Federation) Pallacanestro Reggiana	84	63	147
(Hellenic Basketball Federation) Peristeri	77	88	165
(Hellenic Basketball Federation) PAOK	101	80	181
(Basketball Federation of Bosnia and Herzegovina) Bosna BH Telecom	66	78	144
(Hungarian Basketball Federation) Falco Szombathely	81	70	151
(Spanish Basketball Federation) Surne Bilbao Basket	77	85	162
(Turkish Basketball Federation) Petkim Spor	69	60	129

Semi-finals
(Spanish Basketball Federation) UCAM Murcia	73	89	162
(Hellenic Basketball Federation) PAOK	79	85	164
(Hungarian Basketball Federation) Falco Szombathely	81	88	169
(Spanish Basketball Federation) Surne Bilbao Basket	98	95	193

Finals
(Hellenic Basketball Federation) PAOK	79	74	153
(Spanish Basketball Federation) Surne Bilbao Basket	73	89	162

Source: FIBA

=== Quarter-finals ===
The first legs was held on 11 March, and the second legs on 18 March 2026.

Team 1	Agg.	Team 2	1st leg	2nd leg
UCAM Murcia (Spanish Basketball Federation)	162–147	(Italian Basketball Federation) Pallacanestro Reggiana	85–84	77–63
Peristeri (Hellenic Basketball Federation)	165–181	(Hellenic Basketball Federation) PAOK	77–101	88–80
Bosna BH Telecom (Basketball Federation of Bosnia and Herzegovina)	144–151	(Hungarian Basketball Federation) Falco Szombathely	66–81	78–70
Surne Bilbao Basket (Spanish Basketball Federation)	162–129	(Turkish Basketball Federation) Petkim Spor	77–69	85–60

=== Semi-finals ===
The first legs was held on 1 April, and the second legs on 8 April 2026.

Team 1	Agg.	Team 2	1st leg	2nd leg
UCAM Murcia (Spanish Basketball Federation)	162–164	(Hellenic Basketball Federation) PAOK	73–79	89–85
Falco Szombathely (Hungarian Basketball Federation)	169–193	(Spanish Basketball Federation) Surne Bilbao Basket	81–98	88–95

=== Finals ===
The first leg was held on 22 April, and the second leg on 29 April 2026.

Team 1	Agg.	Team 2	1st leg	2nd leg
PAOK (Hellenic Basketball Federation)	153–162	(Spanish Basketball Federation) Surne Bilbao Basket	79–73	74–89

== Individual awards ==
=== MVP of the Month ===
Month	Player	Team	Ref.
2025
October	(United States) Devonte Green	(Azerbaijan Basketball Federation) Neftçi	
November	(United States) Cleveland Melvin	(Hellenic Basketball Federation) PAOK	
December	(United States) Jake Van Tubbergen	(Hellenic Basketball Federation) Peristeri	
2026
January	(Netherlands) Yannick Franke	(Turkish Basketball Federation) Petkim Spor	
February	(Bosnia and Herzegovina) Edin Atić	(Basketball Federation of Bosnia and Herzegovina) Bosna BH Telecom	
March	(Hungary) Zoltán Perl	(Hungarian Basketball Federation) Falco Szombathely	

== See also ==
- 2025–26 EuroLeague
- 2025–26 Basketball Champions League
- 2025–26 EuroCup Basketball
