= J. J. Frazier =

American basketball player (born 1995)

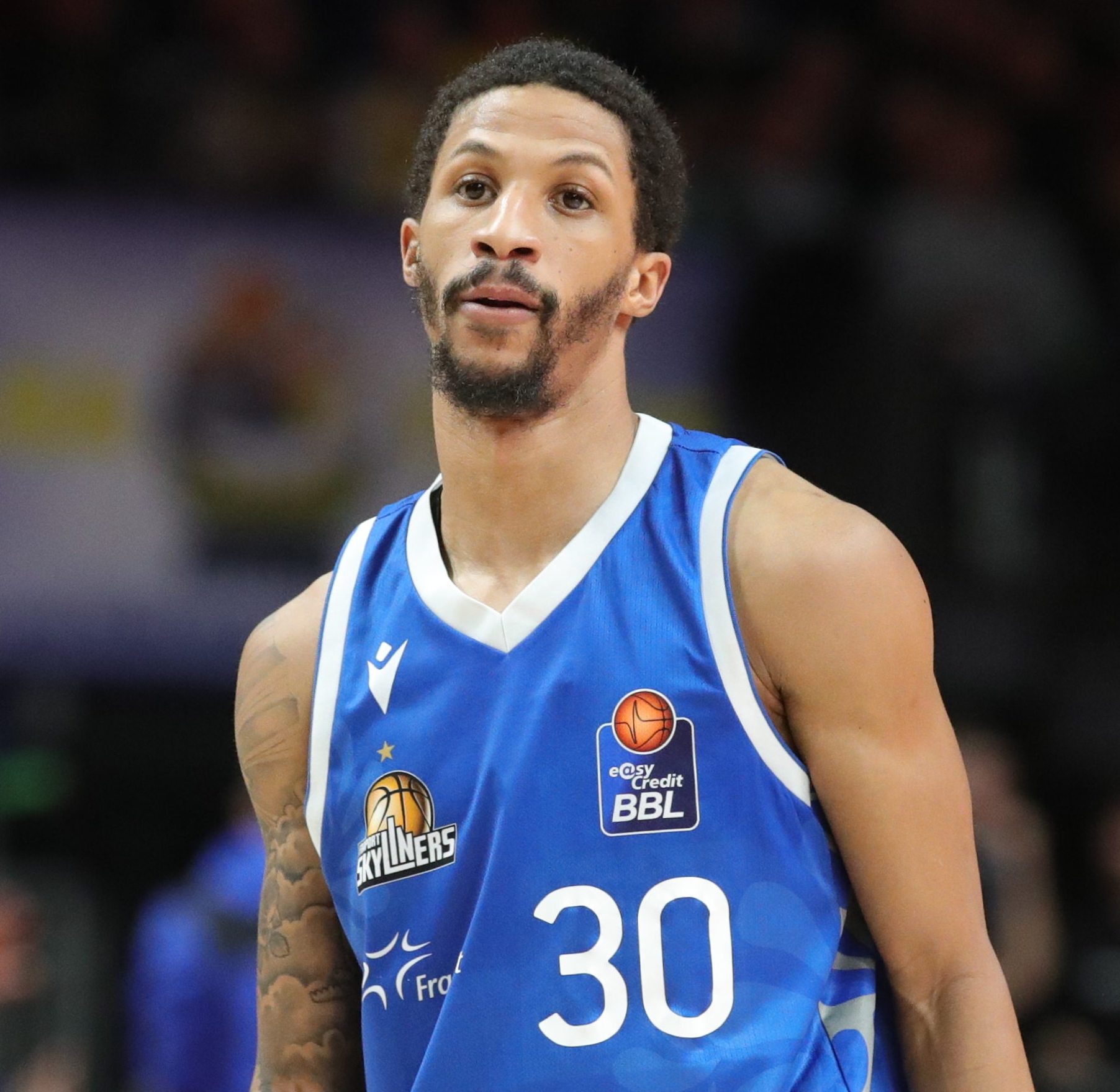
- Frazier with Skyliners Frankfurt in 2023

No. 0 – Absheron Lions
- Position: Point guard
- League: Azerbaijan Basketball League

Personal information
- Born: September 19, 1995 (age 31) Savannah, Georgia, U.S.
- Listed height: 5 ft 10 in (1.78 m)
- Listed weight: 155 lb (70 kg)

Career information
- High school: Faith Baptist Christian Academy (Ludowici, Georgia)
- College: Georgia (2013–2017)
- NBA draft: 2017: undrafted
- Playing career: 2017–present

Career history
- 2017–2018: JDA Dijon
- 2018: Memphis Hustle
- 2018: Treviglio
- 2018: NPC Rieti
- 2019–2020: Scafati
- 2020–2021: Treviglio
- 2021–2022: Samsunspor
- 2022–2023: Skyliners Frankfurt
- 2023–2024: Bornova Belediyespor
- 2024: Guangxi Rhinos
- 2024–2025: Bandırma Bordo
- 2025–present: Absheron Lions

Career highlights
- First-team All-SEC (2017); Second-team All-SEC – Coaches (2016)

James Frazier Jr. (born September 19, 1995) is an American professional basketball player for Absheron Lions of the Azerbaijan Basketball League. He played college basketball for the Georgia Bulldogs.

== High school career ==
Frazier attended Faith Baptist Christian Academy, where he grew from 5'2 as a freshman and became their lead guard. He was a three-star prospect and signed with Georgia.

== College career ==
He averaged 9.5 points, 3.8 rebounds and 3.3 assists per game as a sophomore. In August 2015, Frazier was arrested for two driving-related offenses. As a junior, Frazier averaged 16.9 points and 4.6 rebounds per game. He was named to the Second Team All-SEC. As a senior, Frazier averaged 18.8 points, 4.2 assists, 3.8 rebounds and 1.85 steals per game per game and was named to the First Team All-SEC. During a five-game stretch in February 2017 following an injury to Yante Maten, he averaged 29.6 points per game.

== Professional career ==
After going undrafted in the 2017 NBA draft, Frazier signed with JDA Dijon in France in July 2017. In 16 games, Frazier averaged 8.2 points, 2.6 assists and 2.3 rebounds in 20.9 minutes per game. In February 2018, he was signed by the Memphis Hustle of the NBA G League. Frazier later joined Treviglio of the Italian Serie A2 Basket. In eight games with the team, Frazier posted 24.1 points, 4.4 assists, 3.1 rebounds and 1.38 steals in 32.5 minutes per game, including a 32-point game against Latina Basket on April 8, 2018. He played with NPC Rieti before suffering a season-ending injury four games into the season. On June 28, 2019, Frazier signed a two-year deal with Givova Scafati. After posting 37 points, 13 rebounds and 6 assists against Bergamo Basket 2014, he was named MVP of Serie A2 for the 14th day on December 24, 2019. Frazier averaged 18.2 points per game for Scafati. He returned to Treviglio on July 18, 2020. Frazier averaged 15.8 points, 4.6 rebounds, 4.9 assists and 1.2 steals per game. On August 30, 2021, he signed with Samsunspor of the Turkish Basketball First League.

On August 6, 2022, he has signed with Skyliners Frankfurt of the Basketball Bundesliga.

On June 13, 2024, Frazier joined Guangxi Rhinos of National Basketball League. Frazier averaged 17.88 points, 4.79 rebounds, 5.33 assists in 29.91 minutes in 24 games.

On September 14, 2024, Frazier signed with the Bandırma Bordo of the Türkiye Basketbol Ligi.
