= Tajuan Agee =

American basketball player

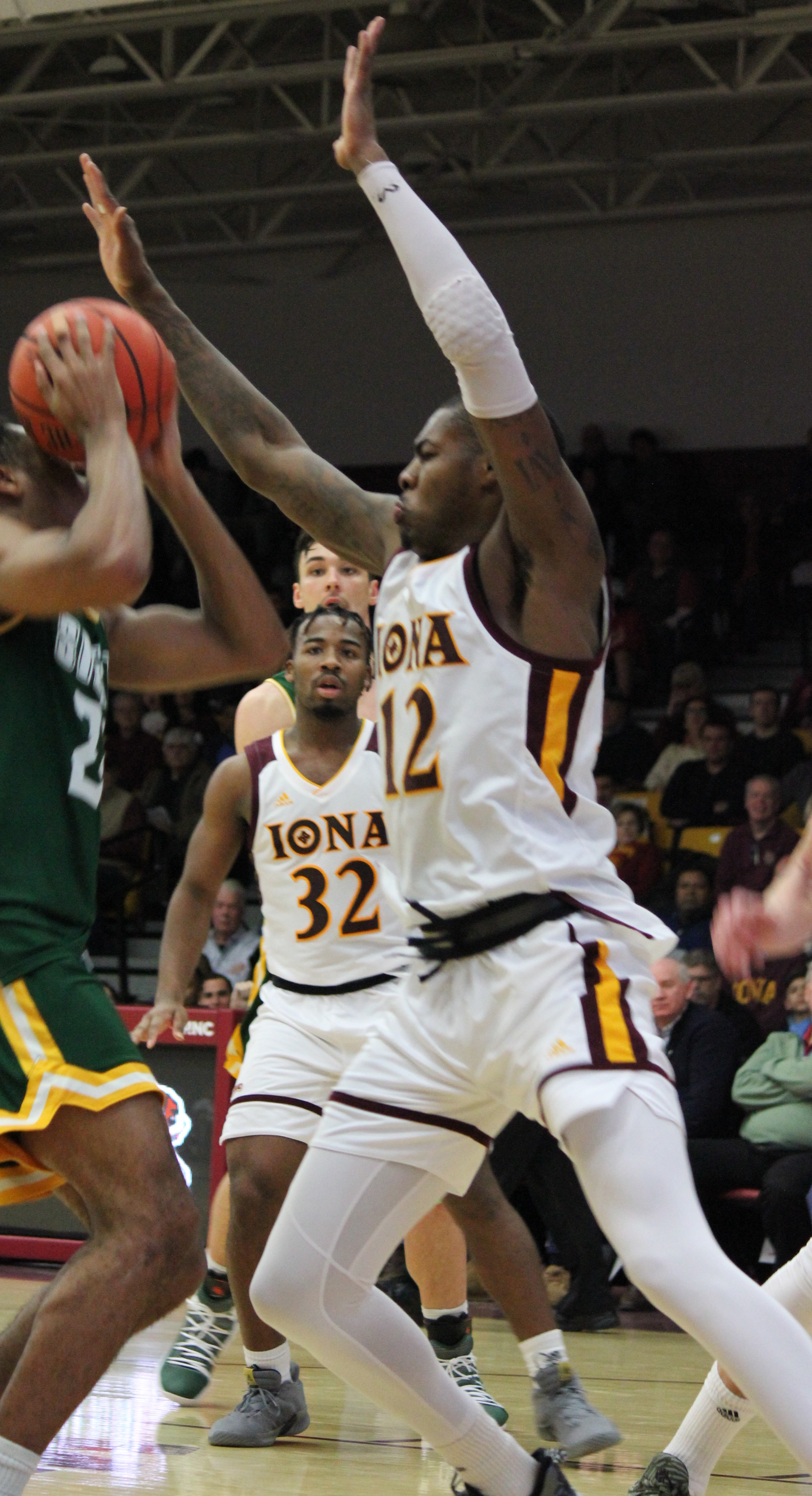
- Tajuan Agee with BCM Gravelines-Dunkerque

No. 13 – Sabah BC
- Position: Power forward
- League: Azerbaijan Basketball League; Champions League

Personal information
- Born: November 12, 1997 (age 29)
- Listed height: 6 ft 9 in (2.06 m)
- Listed weight: 225 lb (102 kg)

Career information
- High school: Hyde Park Academy (Chicago, Illinois)
- College: Tyler JC (2016–2018); Iona (2018–2020)
- NBA draft: 2020: undrafted
- Playing career: 2020–present

Career history
- 2020–2021: Balkan
- 2021: Maccabi Ashdod/Be'er Tuvia
- 2021–2022: Rasta Vechta
- 2022: Hawke's Bay Hawks
- 2022–2023: Rasta Vechta
- 2023–2025: BCM Gravelines-Dunkerque
- 2025–2026: JL Bourg
- 2026–present: Sabah BC

Career highlights
- EuroCup champion (2026); 2× Second-team All-MAAC (2019, 2020)

Tajuan Agee (born November 12, 1997) is an American professional basketball player for Sabah BC of the Azerbaijan Basketball League. He played college basketball for Iona and Tyler Junior College.

== Early life ==
Agee grew up in Chicago and grew up playing baseball and football. He did not start playing organized basketball until eighth grade and expanded his game by playing in an alley. Agee attended Hyde Park Academy High School, where he stood 6'0 as a freshman and played against Jabari Parker. Agee grew three inches every year in high school and switched from being a guard to a forward. As a senior, he averaged 20 points and 12 rebounds per game and earned All-City and All-State honors.

== College career ==
After high school, Agee played at Tyler Junior College for two years. He transferred to Iona despite it not being his first choice. Agee averaged 13.2 points per game and led the MAAC in rebounding with 8.0 per game, earning Third Team All-MAAC honors. On February 29, 2020, Agee scored a career-high 28 points and collected eight rebounds in a 101–91 loss to Niagara. As a senior, he averaged 14.7 points, 7.2 rebounds and three assists per game, shooting 38 percent from three-point range. He was named to the Second Team All-MAAC.

== Professional career ==
On July 8, 2020, Agee signed with BC Balkan Botevgrad of the Bulgarian National Basketball League.

Agee initially signed with Maccabi Haifa of the Israeli National League for the 2021–22 season, but then joined Maccabi Ashdod/Be'er Tuvia for a two-game stint in October 2021. On November 11, 2021, he signed with SC Rasta Vechta of the German ProA.

On May 26, 2022, Agee signed with the Hawke's Bay Hawks for the rest of the 2022 New Zealand NBL season.

On June 13, 2022, he signed an extension with Rasta Vechta of the German ProA.

On July 9, 2023, Tajuan Agee signed with the French club BCM Gravelines-Dunkerque. On June 8, 2024, the team re-signed Agee for another season. On April 15, 2025, he received a Hoops Agents Player of the Week award after having the game-high 20 points, 9 rebounds and 4 assists in his team's victory.

In August 2025, Agee was added to the Dubai Basketball for preseason training camp alongside Nick Ongenda and Tomislav Zubcic

On November 21, 2025, he signed with JL Bourg of the LNB Pro A.

On September 15, 2026, he signed with Sabah BC of the Azerbaijan Basketball League.

== Personal life ==
Agee is the eldest of six siblings and has Jamaican heritage.

Agee is the nephew of Arthur Agee from the basketball documentary "Hoop Dreams".
