= Boban Mitev =

Macedonian basketball coach

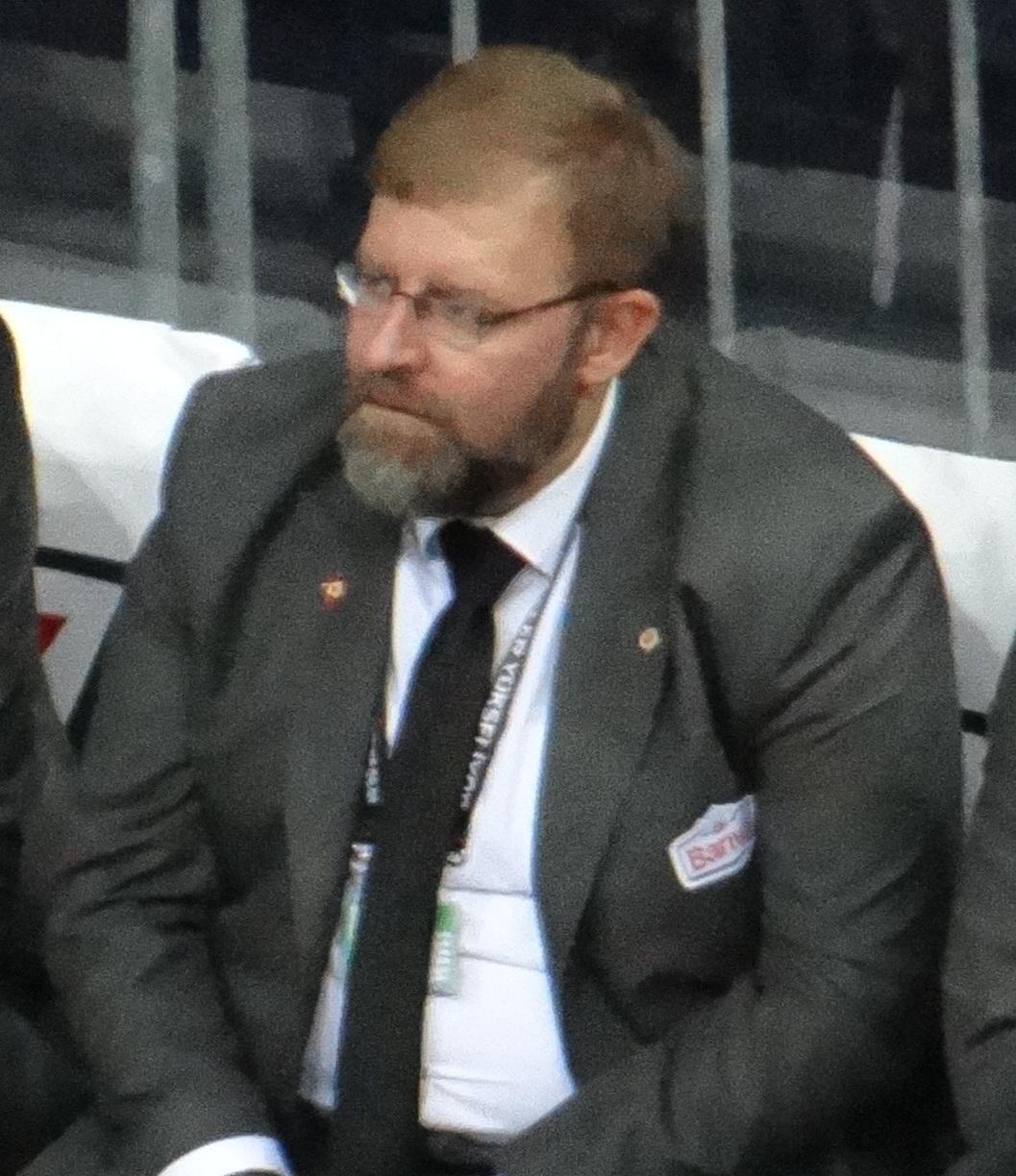

Sabah BC
- Position: Head coach
- League: Azerbaijan Basketball League

Personal information
- Born: 7 August 1972 (age 54) Skopje, SR Macedonia, SFR Yugoslavia

Career history
- 1996–1998: MZT Skopje (assistant)
- 1998–1999: Karpoš Sokoli
- 1999–2000: MZT Skopje (assistant)
- 2000–2001: Vardar
- 2001–2003: BC Komprad
- 2003–2006: Anwil Włocławek (assistant)
- 2006–2009: Turów Zgorzelec (assistant)
- 2009: MZT Skopje
- 2009–2010: Lokomotiv Rostov (assistant)
- 2010: Bashkimi Prizren
- 2010–2011: Alba Berlin (assistant)
- 2011–2013: Iran national basketball team
- 2013–2014: Qeshm
- 2014: MZT Skopje (assistant)
- 2014–2015: MZT Skopje
- 2015: Kožuv
- 2015–2016: Petroshimi
- 2016–2018: Banvit (assistant)
- 2018–2019: Monaco (assistant)
- 2020–2021: Partizan (assistant)
- 2022: Angeli
- 2023–2024: Sabah BC

Boban "Bobi" Mitev (Macedonian: Бобан "Боби" Митев; born 7 August 1972) is a Macedonian professional basketball coach, who most recently served as head coach for Sabah BC in the Azerbaijan Basketball League.
