= Lazar Spasić =

Serbian basketball coach and player

Sabah BC
- Title: Head coach
- League: Azerbaijan Basketball League; Champions League

Personal information
- Born: 4 June 1992 (age 34) Zaječar, SR Serbia, Yugoslavia
- Listed height: 1.84 m (6 ft 0 in)

Career information
- Playing career: 2010–2013
- Position: Point guard
- Number: 12
- Coaching career: 2013–present

Career history

Coaching
- 2013–2016: Mladost Zemun (assistant)
- 2016–2017: Mladost Zemun
- 2017–2019: Boljevac
- 2019–2022: Leskovac
- 2023–2025: Vršac
- 2025: Oldenburg (assistant)
- 2025–2026: Oldenburg
- 2026–present: Sabah BC

Career highlights
- Second League of Serbia champion (2021)

Lazar Spasić (Serbian Cyrillic: Лазар Спасић; born 4 June 1992) is a Serbian professional basketball coach and former player. He is the current head coach for Sabah BC of the Azerbaijan Basketball League (ABL).

== Playing career ==
As a point guard, Spasić played for Tamiš, Mladost Čačak, Mladost Zaječar, and Rtanj. He retired as a player with Mladost Čačak in 2013.

== Coaching career ==
In 2013, Spasić started his coaching career as an assistant coach for Mladost Zemun in 2013, under Dragan Nikolić. In May 2016, he was promoted to the head coach for the 2016–17 KLS season at age 24. In summer of 2017, Spasić joined a training camp of the Slovenian national team upon invitation of their head coach Igor Kokoškov. In late 2017, he joined Rtanj as the head coach.

On 30 June 2019, Zdravlje hired Spasić as their new head coach. In July 2022, he signed a contract extension with Zdravlje.

On May 22, 2025, he signed with EWE Baskets Oldenburg of the Basketball Bundesliga (BBL) as an assistant coach. Following the sacking of Predrag Krunić on December 7, 2025, Spasić was promoted to the head coach position.
