= Rodrigo Pastore =

Argentine basketball player and coach

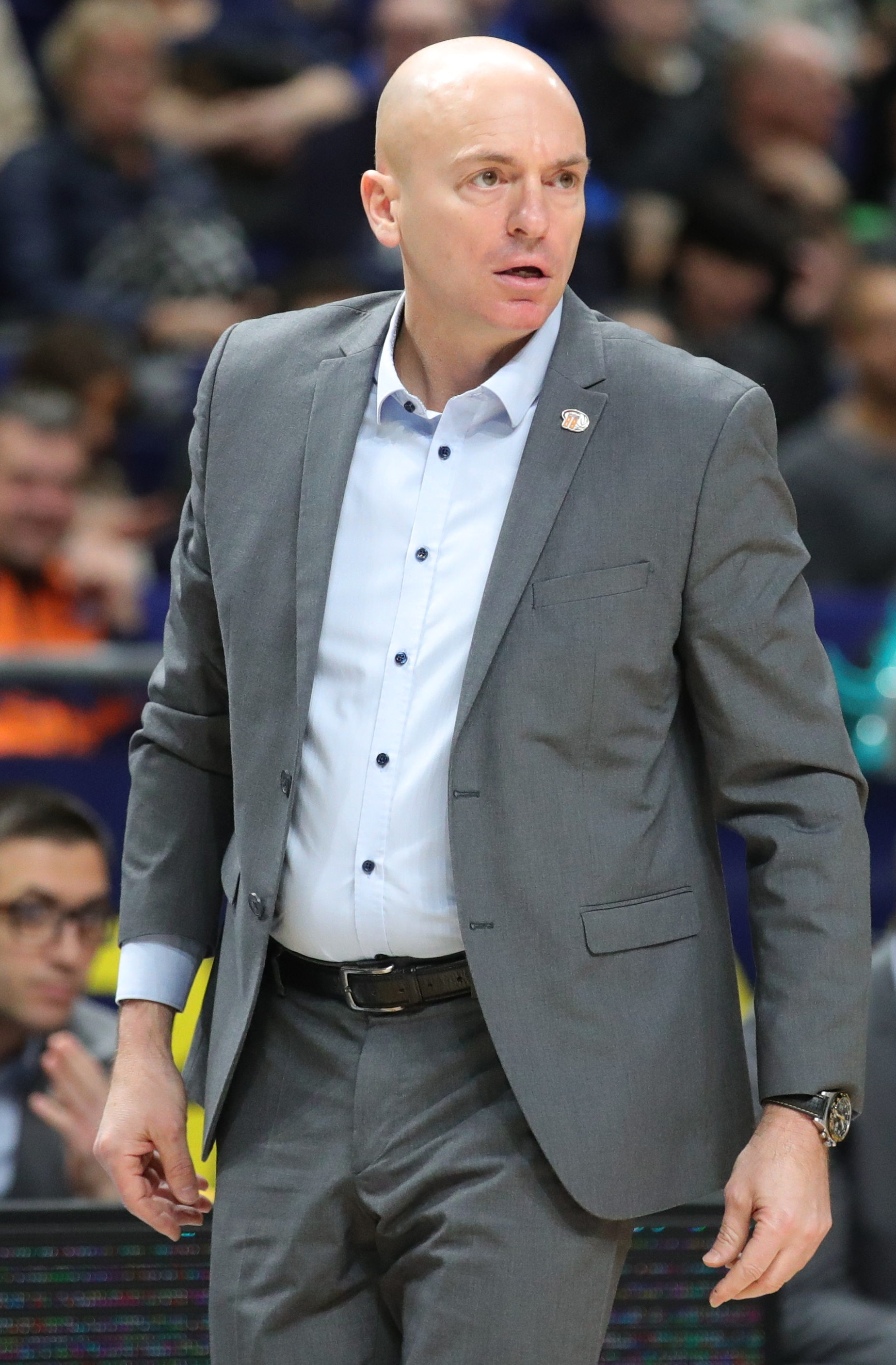
- Pastore in 2023

Niners Chemnitz
- Title: Head coach
- League: Basketball Bundesliga; EuroCup

Personal information
- Born: 16 September 1972 (age 54) Buenos Aires, Argentina
- Listed height: 1.88 m (6 ft 2 in)

Career information
- Playing career: 1996–2006
- Position: Point guard
- Coaching career: 2006–present

Career history

Playing
- 1996: TG Landshut
- 1996–1998: Bayreuth
- 1998–1999: Jesi
- 1999–2000: Bonn
- 2000–2001: Popolare Ragusa
- 2001–2002: Trieste
- 2002–2003: Popolare Ragusa
- 2004–2005: Garofoli Osimo
- 2005–2006: Lugano Tigers

Coaching
- 2006–2013: SAV Vacallo
- 2015–present: Niners Chemnitz

Career highlights
- As player: Swiss League champion (2006); As head coach: FIBA Europe Cup champion (2024); Basketball Bundesliga Coach of the Year (2024)

Rodrigo Augusto Pastore (born 16 September 1972) is an Argentine basketball coach and former player. He currently serves as the head coach for Niners Chemnitz of the German Basketball Bundesliga (BBL) and the EuroCup. Born in Buenos Aires, Pastore has played in Germany, Italy and Switzerland.

== Coaching career ==
He started his coaching career in 2006 with SAV Vacallo Basket.

In 2015, he became head coach of Niners Chemnitz in the German second division ProA. In 2020, Pastore achieved promotion to the top level Basketball Bundesliga with the Niners.

In the 2023–24 season, Pastore and Chemnitz established themselves at the top of the Bundesliga and became league leaders in December 2023. Pastore led Chemnitz to win the FIBA Europe Cup competition in April 2024. In the Bundesliga, he was named the best coach of the 2023–24 season.
