= 2019–20 Azerbaijan Basketball League =

Azerbaijan Basketball League
- Season: 2019–20
- Duration: 10 October 2019 – May 2020
- Teams: 8

The 2019–20 Azerbaijan Basketball League was the 27th season of the top professional basketball league in Azerbaijan.

== Teams ==
Eight teams joined the competition. Only the 80ies repeated presence from the previous season.

Team	Location
80ies	
Atletik	Baku
Atom	
Gəncə	Ganja
Sərkərdə	
Sıçrayış	
Xırdalan	Xırdalan
Zirvə	Astara

== Competition format ==
The eight clubs played a four-legged round robin tournament where the four first qualified teams would advance to the playoffs. The league started on 10 October 2019.

== Regular season ==
=== League table ===
Pos	Team	Pld	W	L	PF	PA	PD	Pts	Qualification or relegation
1	Zirvə	19	17	2	1798	1489	+309	36	Qualification to playoffs
2	Atom	19	13	6	1567	1391	+176	32	Qualification to playoffs
3	Gəncə	19	11	8	1539	1529	+10	30	Qualification to playoffs
4	Xırdalan	19	9	10	1395	1294	+101	28	Qualification to playoffs
5	Sərkərdə	18	9	9	1464	1421	+43	27	
6	Atletik	18	9	9	1341	1361	−20	27	
7	Sıçrayış	19	6	13	1289	1572	−283	25	
8	80ies	17	0	17	1211	1547	−336	17	

Updated to match(es) played on 29 February 2020. Source: ABSL

=== Results ===
Home \ Away	80S	ATL	ATO	GEN	SER	SIC	XIR	ZIR	80S	ATL	ATO	GEN	SER	SIC	XIR	ZIR
80ies	—	14 Dec	65–77	81–89	65–120	71–73	55–83	66–89	—							79–101
Atletik	87–64	—	94–102	79–91	75–74	65–44	57–64	82–70	90–85	—				70–66		
Atom	110–64	97–78	—	81–73	73–79	94–62	72–64	95–89		93–63	—				69–81	
Gəncə	97–78	59–76	79–65	—	81–72	79–70	75–95	94–101			86–78	—	99–82			84–101
Sərkərdə	76–72	85–60	66–61	83–106	—	84–64	81–60	77–89			65–82		—	89–75		
Sıçrayış	84–77	50–90	60–100	78–68	78–63	—	59–58	64–123	91–85		62–84	77–87		—		
Xırdalan	80–67	67–73	63–72	82–60	62–70	80–52	—	71–85	86–52	75–57		73–76			—	
Zirvə	114–85	73–61	98–62	77–56	103–86	105–80	80–79	—		102–84			116–112		82–72	—

Updated to match(es) played on 29 February 2020. Source: Eurobasket.com
Legend: Blue = home team win; Red = away team win.

== Playoffs ==
The playoffs were cancelled due to the COVID-19 pandemic.
