= Nike Sibande =

American basketball player, born 1999

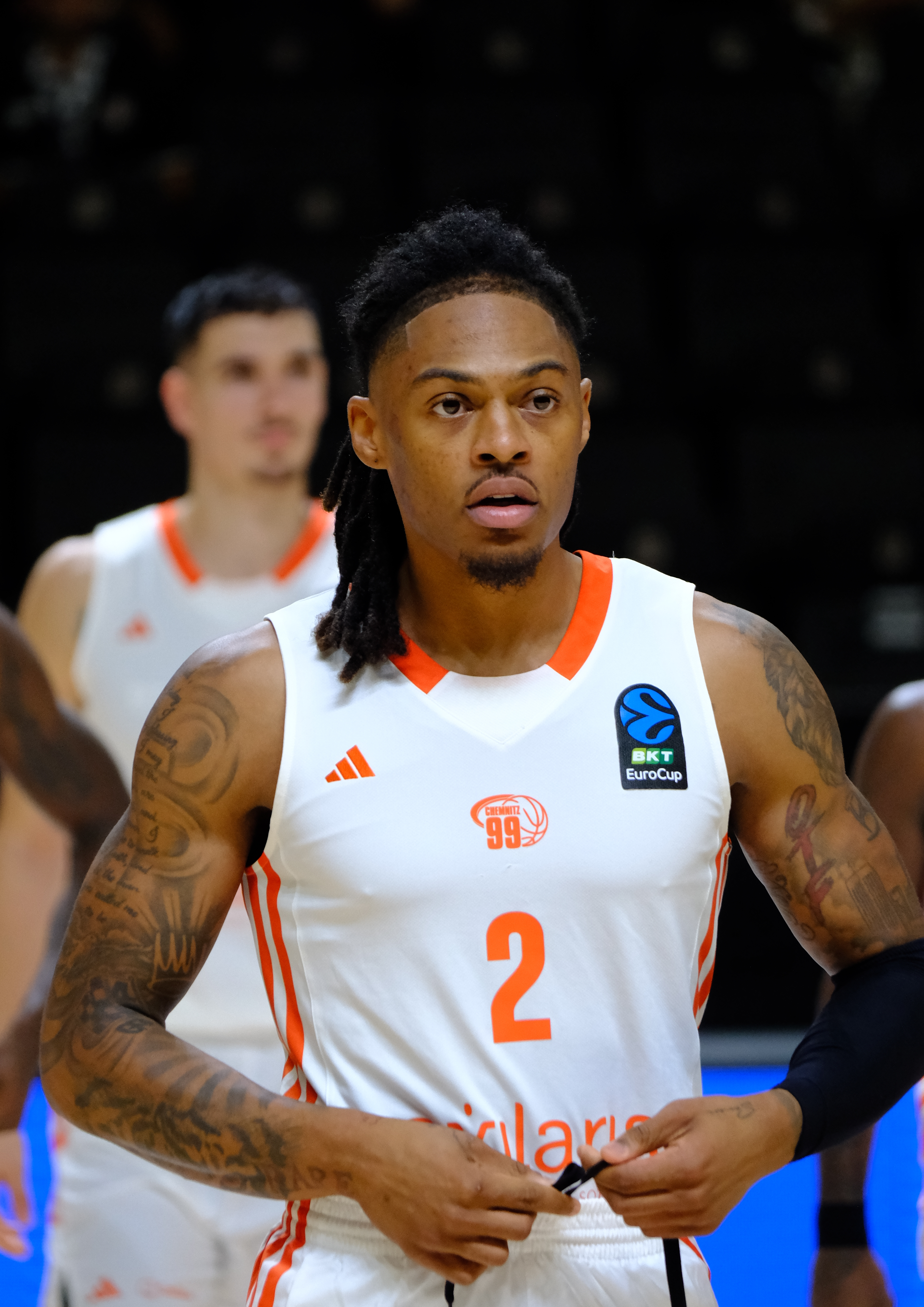
- Sibande with Niners Chemnitz in 2025

No. 1 – Ironi Kiryat Ata
- Position: Point guard
- League: Israeli Basketball Premier League

Personal information
- Born: June 6, 1999 (age 27) Indianapolis, Indiana, U.S.
- Listed height: 6 ft 4 in (1.93 m)
- Listed weight: 185 lb (84 kg)

Career information
- High school: Crispus Attucks (Indianapolis, Indiana)
- College: Miami (Ohio) (2017–2020); Pittsburgh (2020–2023)
- NBA draft: 2023: undrafted
- Playing career: 2023–present

Career history
- 2023: Kataja
- 2023–2024: Maroussi
- 2024: Merkezefendi
- 2024–2025: Bàsquet Girona
- 2025: Darüşşafaka
- 2025–2026: Niners Chemnitz
- 2026–present: Ironi Kiryat Ata

Career highlights
- ACC Sixth Man of the Year (2023); Third-team All-MAC (2019); MAC Freshman of the Year (2018)

Nike Dejur Sibande (born 6 June 1999) is an American professional basketball player for Ironi Kiryat Ata of the Israeli Basketball Premier League. Internationally, Sibande has played for the Ugandan national team.

He played college basketball for the Miami Redhawks, with whom he was 2018 MAC Freshman of the Year and 2019 Third-team All-MAC. Sibande then played college basketball with the Pittsburgh Panthers, with whom he was 2023 Atlantic Coast Conference Sixth Man of the Year.

== Early life ==
Sibande was born in Indianapolis, Indiana, to Tracy and Joey Sibande. He has one daughter.

== High school ==
Sibande attended Crispus Attucks High School in Indianapolis, Indiana. Playing basketball for the school, as a junior he averaged 16.2 points and 12.5 rebounds per game.

As a senior, he averaged 22.0 points and 7.2 rebounds per game. Sibande was named to the 2017 Indiana Basketball Coaches Association Subway Senior All-State Supreme 15 as one of the top 15 seniors in the state of Indiana, and earned High Honorable Mention All-State honors from the Associated Press.

== College career ==
=== Miami Redhawks ===
Sibande played college basketball for the Miami Redhawks from 2017 to 2020.

As a freshman in the 2017–18 season, in 34 games Sibande averaged 32.9 minutes, 15.1 points, 4.3 rebounds, 1.2 assists, and 1.1 steals per game. In 2018 he was named MAC Freshman of the Year, MAC All-Freshman Team, and All-MAC Honorable Mention.

As a sophomore in the 2018–19 season, in 32 games he averaged 30.0 minutes, 16.2 points (10th in the league), 5.1 rebounds, and 1.2 assists per game. In 2019 Sibande was named All-MAC Third Team.

As a junior in the 2019–20 season, in 31 games Sibande averaged 28.8 minutes, 13.9 points, 5.9 rebounds, and 1.7 assists per game, while shooting 82.0% from the free throw line (5th in the league).

=== Pittsburgh Panthers ===
Sibande then played for the Pittsburgh Panthers from 2020 to 2023. As a senior in the 2020–21 season, in 14 games he averaged 19.7 minutes, 6.9 points, 3.0 rebounds, and 1.5 assists per game, while shooting 43.6% from three point range. He tore his ACL in his right knee in November 2021, had surgery, and did not play in the 2021–22 season.

In the 2022–23 season, in 36 games he averaged 22.4 minutes, 8.4 points, 4.1 rebounds, and 1.2 assists per game. In 2023 Sibande was named ACC Sixth Man of the Year.

== Professional career ==
=== Kataja ===
On 22 August 2023, Sibande started his professional career after signing with Kataja BC in Finnish Korisliiga and the FIBA Europe Cup. He left Joensuu at the end of December 2023 after playing 12 games in the Korisliiga and 8 other games, when leading the Korisliiga with an average of 22.6 points per game, and averaging 29.9 minutes, 8.9 rebounds (8th), 2.7 assists per game, while shooting 49.7% from the floor, 41.5% from three point range, and 82.2% from the free throw line.

=== Maroussi ===
Kataja received buyout financial compensation from Maroussi in Greece for his contract, allowing Sibande to leave his contract early, though he only played for the team for a short stint.

=== Merkezefendi ===
He next signed with Merkezefendi in Turkish Basketbol Süper Ligi on 26 January 2024. In 2024 with Merkezefendi, Sibande played 12 games and averaged 26.0 minutes, 14.7 points, 4.0 rebounds, and 1.5 assists per game, while shooting 52.4% from the floor.

=== Bàsquet Girona ===
In July 2024, he moved to Spain after signing with Bàsquet Girona in the Liga ACB for the 2024–25 season. Sibande played 25 games and averaged 17.5 minutes, 6.3 points, and 2.8 rebounds per game.

=== Darüşşafaka ===
On April 1, 2025, Sibande signed with Darüşşafaka of the Basketbol Süper Ligi (BSL). In 2025 with the team, he played 7 games and averaged 15.9 minutes, 7.4 points, 2.3 rebounds, and 1.4 assists per game.

=== Niners Chemnitz ===
On 26 July 2025, Sibande joined Niners Chemnitz in Basketball Bundesliga and the EuroCup. In the 2025–26 season, in 42 games he averaged 23.8 minutes, 9.5 points, 3.2 rebounds, and 2.1 assists per game.

=== Ironi Kiryat Ata ===
In 2026–27, Sibande is playing for Ironi Kiryat Ata of the Israeli Basketball Premier League.

== National team career ==
Sibande was naturalized as a Ugandan, in order to represent the Uganda national basketball team. He was part of the squad for the FIBA Basketball World Cup Qualifiers. In 2025 he played six games for the team in the FIBA African World Cup Qualifier Tournament, and averaged 36.2 minutes, 15.2 points (9th in the competition), 6.7 rebounds, 5.0 assists (4th), and 2.2 steals (tied for 2nd)per game.

== Career statistics ==
Legend
GP	Games played	GS	Games started	MPG	Minutes per game
FG%	Field goal percentage	3P%	3-point field goal percentage	FT%	Free throw percentage
RPG	Rebounds per game	APG	Assists per game	SPG	Steals per game
BPG	Blocks per game	PPG	Points per game	**Bold**	Career high

=== EuroCup ===
Year	Team	GP	GS	MPG	FG%	3P%	FT%	RPG	APG	SPG	BPG	PPG	PIR
2025–26	Niners Chemnitz	17	7	23.3	.449	.261	.837	3.4	1.8	.6	.1	9.1	9.6
