= 2018–19 Azerbaijan Basketball League =

Basketball league season

Azerbaijan Basketball League
- Season: 2018–19
- Duration: 27 October 2018 – May 2019
- Teams: 6

Finals
- Champions: NTD
- Runners-up: AGUNP

The 2018–19 Azerbaijan Basketball League, is the 26th season of the top professional basketball league in Azerbaijan.

== Competition format ==
The six clubs played a four-legged round robin tournament where the four first qualified teams would advance to the playoffs.

== Regular season ==
=== League table ===
Pos	Team	Pld	W	L	PF	PA	PD	Pts	Qualification or relegation
1	AZTOP	5	5	0	476	291	+185	10	Qualification to playoffs
2	NTD	5	4	1	386	299	+87	9	Qualification to playoffs
3	NTD U-18	5	3	2	368	303	+65	8	Qualification to playoffs
4	80-ies	4	1	3	304	319	−15	5	Qualification to playoffs
5	AGUNP	5	1	4	325	408	−83	6	
6	ALOV	4	0	4	171	410	−239	4	

Updated to match(es) played on 9 December 2018. Source: Eurobasket.com

=== Results ===
Home \ Away	80s	AGU	ALO	AZT	NTD	U18
80-ies	—	79–60		74–98		81–82
AGUNP	78–89	—	97–56		68–87	46–67
ALOV			—		69–116	33–108
AZTOP	89–74	119–54	110–50	—	68–63	81–50
NTD	79–70		95–32		—	62–61
NTD U-18		59–63			60–73	—

Updated to match(es) played on 9 December 2018. Source:
Legend: Blue = home team win; Red = away team win.

== Playoffs ==
The semi-finals were played in a best-of-three playoff format and the finals in a best-of-five playoff format (1-1-1-1-1).

=== Bracket ===
Semi-finals
NTD	2
AGUNP	0
AZTOP	2
80-ies	0

Finals
NTD	2
AZTOP	0

=== Semi-finals ===
Team 1	Series	Team 2	Game 1	Game 2	Game 3
NTD	2–0	AGUNP		111–83	
AZTOP	2–0	80ies	79–74	70–63	

=== Finals ===
Team 1	Series	Team 2	Game 1	Game 2	Game 3
NTD	2–0	AZTOP	99–89	78–60	

=== Third place series ===
Team 1	Series	Team 2	Game 1	Game 2	Game 3
80-ies	1–1	AGUNP	89–63	79–86	
