= Absheron Lions =

- Nickname: The Lions
- Leagues: Azerbaijan Basketball League; Europe Cup
- Founded: 1 January 2022; 4 years ago
- History: Landau Lions (2025–present)
- Location: Baku, Azerbaijan
- Team colors: White, blue
- Head coach: Erhan Toker
Home	Away

Absheron Lions (in Azerbaijani: Abşeron Lions Basketbol Klubu), also known as Landau Lions, is a professional basketball club based in Baku, Azerbaijan. The team currently competes in the Azerbaijan Basketball League, the country's top-tier basketball competition.

== History ==
The Absheron Lions were founded in 2022, originally under names like AAAF Xirdalan BK and Xirdalan BK, with the aim of revitalizing professional basketball in the Absheron region. The club debuted in the Azerbaijan Basketball League in the 2022–23 season, finishing in fourth position and reaching the semi-finals. The following year, they reached the semi-finals again. In the 2024–25 season, Absheron reached the semi-finals for the third consecutive time, after advancing past the play-in.

As the third placed team in the previous season, Lions qualified for the 2025–26 FIBA Europe Cup qualifying rounds, where they will make their European debut.

== Players ==
=== Current roster ===
Note: Flags indicate national team eligibility at FIBA-sanctioned events. Players may hold other non-FIBA nationalities not displayed.

Absheron Lions roster
Players
Coaches

Pos.	No.	Nat.	Name	Ht.
SG	2	(Azerbaijan)	Abdullayev, Ismayil	1.86 m (6 ft 1 in)	18 – 28 June 2008
C		(Azerbaijan)	Donat, Ercan	2.06 m (6 ft 9 in)	26 – 1 February 2000
PF		(Lithuania)	Orelik, Gediminas	2.00 m (6 ft 7 in)	36 – 14 May 1990
PG		(United States)	Frazier, J. J.	1.78 m (5 ft 10 in)	31 – 19 September 1995
PG		(United States)	Perkins, Jordan	1.85 m (6 ft 1 in)	28 – 5 October 1998
SG		(United States)	Polite Jr., Edward	1.96 m (6 ft 5 in)	29 – 18 July 1997
C		(Azerbaijan)	Donat, Saadettin	2.07 m (6 ft 9 in)	25 – 7 January 2001
G/F		(United States)	Jackson, De'Ondre	1.92 m (6 ft 4 in)	30 – 3 July 1996
C		(United States)	Sakenis, Arnas	2.16 m (7 ft 1 in)	22 – 11 July 2004
F/C		(Azerbaijan)	Mammadli, Nijat	2.00 m (6 ft 7 in)	28 – 23 March 1998
SG		(United States)	Walton, Kerwin	1.95 m (6 ft 5 in)	25 – 20 October 2001
SF		(Azerbaijan)	Novruzlu, Tamerlan	1.87 m (6 ft 2 in)	16 – 3 December 2009

Head coach

- Vacant

Legend

- (C) Team captain
- Injured

- Roster
Updated: 4 August 2025

== Head coaches ==
- Erhan Toker (2024–present)

== Season by season ==
Season	Tier	Division	Pos.	W–L	Cup	Other cups	European competitions	
2022–23	1	ABL	4th	19–9		—		
2023–24	1	ABL	4th	12–6		—		
2024–25	1	ABL	4th	8–11	TBD	—		
2025–26	1	ABL					FIBA Europe Cup	TBD

== Trophies and awards ==
- Azerbaijan Cup
  - Runners-up: 2023–24

== See also ==
- Azerbaijan Basketball League
