= Kaza Kajami-Keane =

Canadian basketball player (born 1994)

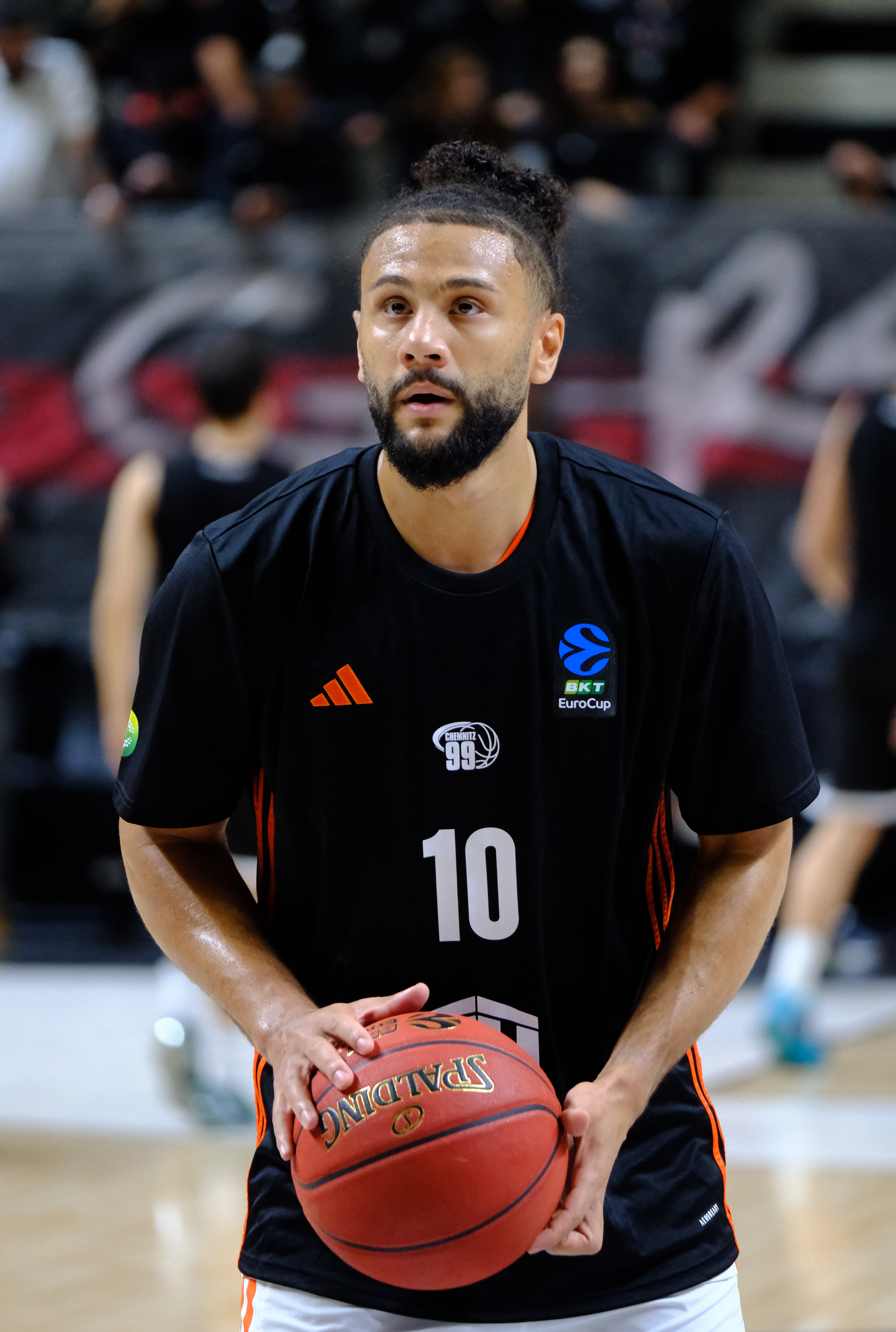
- Kajami-Keane with Niners Chemnitz in 2025

No. 10 – Dinamo Sassari
- Position: Point guard / shooting guard
- League: Lega Basket Serie A

Personal information
- Born: January 27, 1994 (age 32) Ajax, Ontario, Canada
- Listed height: 1.88 m (6 ft 2 in)
- Listed weight: 84 kg (185 lb)

Career information
- High school: Pickering (Ajax, Ontario)
- College: Illinois State (2012–2014); Cleveland State (2014–2015); Carleton (2015–2017)
- NBA draft: 2017: undrafted
- Playing career: 2017–present

Career history
- 2017–2018: Raptors 905
- 2018–2019: Landstede Zwolle
- 2019–2020: Mitteldeutscher BC
- 2020–2023: Le Mans Sarthe
- 2023–2024: Niners Chemnitz
- 2024–2025: Spartak Subotica
- 2025–2026: Niners Chemnitz
- 2026: Löwen Braunschweig
- 2026–present: Dinamo Sassari

Career highlights
- FIBA Europe Cup champion (2024); FIBA Europe Cup Final MVP (2024); DBL champion (2019); DBL Playoffs MVP (2019); All-DBL Team (2019); DBL All-Defense Team (2019)

Kaza Kajami-Keane (born January 27, 1994) is a Canadian-Jamaican professional basketball player for Dinamo Sassari of the Lega Basket Serie A (LBA). He played college basketball for the Illinois State Redbirds, the Cleveland State Vikings and the Carleton Ravens. He has also competed for the Canadian national team.

He started his professional career in 2017, playing in the NBA G League and later for teams in the Netherlands, Germany and France. Kajami-Keane led Niners Chemnitz to the FIBA Europe Cup title in 2024, earning Finals MVP honours in the process.

== Professional career ==
=== Raptors 905 ===
Kajami-Keane made his professional debut with Raptors 905 in the NBA G League. In the 2017–18 season, he averaged 6.3 points and 4.2 assists in 18.5 minutes per game.

=== Landstede Zwolle ===
In August 2018, Kajami-Keane signed with Landstede Basketbal of the Dutch Basketball League (DBL). On 1 June 2019, Kajami-Keane won the DBL championship with Landstede, the first in club history. Kajami-Keane was named the DBL Play-offs MVP, after averaging 18.3 points and 5.3 assists in 12 playoff games.

=== Mitteldeutscher BC ===
On July 31, 2019, Kajami-Keane signed with Mitteldeutscher BC, for sponsorship reasons for the 2019–20 season. With MBC, he would play in the German Basketball Bundesliga (BBL). He averaged 15.2 points, 5.3 assists and 2.7 rebounds per game.

=== Le Mans Sarthe ===
On June 8, 2020, Kajami-Keane signed with Le Mans Sarthe of the LNB Pro A. He averaged 12.2 points and 4.1 assists per game. Kajami-Keane re-signed with the team on June 25, 2021.

=== Niners Chemnitz ===
Kajami-Keane joined German club Niners Chemnitz, returning to the BBL after three years. He won the FIBA Europe Cup title with Chemnitz, and was named the Finals MVP following a record-setting 29 points in the second game.

=== Spartak Subotica ===
He inked a deal with Spartak Subotica of Serbia in June 2024.

=== Return to Niners Chemnitz ===
On June 21, 2025, he signed with Niners Chemnitz in the German Basketball Bundesliga (BBL) and the .

=== Löwen Braunschweig ===
On February 4, 2026, he signed with Löwen Braunschweig of the Basketball Bundesliga (BBL).

== National team career ==
On December 3, 2017, Kajami-Keane made his debut in the Canadian national basketball team in a 94–67 win over Brazil at the 2019 FIBA Basketball World Cup qualification stage.
