= Sabah BC =

Sabah
- League: Azerbaijan Basketball League; Champions League
- Founded: 1 September 2022; 4 years ago
- History: Sabah BC; 2022–present
- Arena: National Gymnastics Arena; Baku Sports Palace
- Capacity: 9,600; 1,736
- Location: Baku, Azerbaijan
- Team colors: Pink, black, whire
- President: Magsud Adigozalov
- Head coach: Lazar Spasić
- Team captain: Endar Poladkhanli
- Championships: 3 Azerbaijan Basketball League
- Website: sabahpsc.az
Home	Away

Sabah Basketball Club, also known simply as Sabah BC or Sabah, is an Azerbaijani professional basketball team based in Baku. Founded in 2022, as a team affiliated to the Sabah FC football team, they joined the Azerbaijan Basketball League (ABL) in the 2022–23 season. They won the national championship in their debut season.

As champions, they entered the 2023–24 FIBA Europe Cup qualifying rounds, as the first Azerbaijani team to play in a European competition in 18 years (after Gala Baku in 2005). Following three wins in the qualifying tournament in Skopje, Sabah qualified for the regular season.

Boban Mitev was appointed as Sabah's new head coach in August 2023. On 26 January 2024 he was replaced by Rimas Kurtinaitis.

== Honours ==
Azerbaijan Basketball League

- Winners (4): 2022–23, 2023–24, 2024–25, 2025–26

== Players ==
=== Current roster ===
Note: Flags indicate national team eligibility at FIBA-sanctioned events. Players may hold other non-FIBA nationalities not displayed.

Sabah BC roster
Players
Coaches

Pos.	No.	Nat.	Name	Ht.	Wt.	Age
C	0	(Azerbaijan)	Isayev, Musa	2.06 m (6 ft 9 in)		16 – 22 August 2010
PG	3	(United States)	Ertel, Michael	1.87 m (6 ft 2 in)		26 – 22 October 1999
G	4	(United States)	Blakes, Gerry	1.93 m (6 ft 4 in)		32 – 16 November 1993
PG	7	(Azerbaijan)	Shirzadov, Shirzad	1.88 m (6 ft 2 in)		26 – 30 May 2000
SF	12	(Azerbaijan)	Abbasov, Rashid	1.95 m (6 ft 5 in)		21 – 21 December 2004
PF	13	(United States)	Agee, Tajuan	2.07 m (6 ft 9 in)		28 – 12 November 1997
SG	14	(Azerbaijan)	Poladkhanli, Endar (C)	2.00 m (6 ft 7 in)		28 – 12 October 1998
C	15	(Azerbaijan)	Ballard, Quincy	2.10 m (6 ft 11 in)		25 – 28 July 2001
G/F	21	(United States)	Manning, Charles	1.96 m (6 ft 5 in)		27 – 22 October 1998
PG	23	(Azerbaijan)	Mammadov, Kamran	1.85 m (6 ft 1 in)		26 – 3 May 2000
PF	24	(United States)	Bruinsma, Evan	2.02 m (6 ft 8 in)		34 – 9 September 1992
PF	29	(Lithuania)	Susinskas, Mindaugas	2.04 m (6 ft 8 in)		31 – 22 February 1995
F	33	(United States)	Perkins, Nick	2.03 m (6 ft 8 in)		29 – 15 October 1996
SF	35	(United States)	Fidler, Frankie	2.00 m (6 ft 7 in)		23 – 25 April 2003

Head coach

- (Serbia) Lazar Spasić

Assistant coach(es)

- (Serbia) Saša Milićević
- (Georgia (country)) Anatoli Boisa

Legend

- (C) Team captain
- Injured

- Roster
Updated: October 14, 2026

== Head coaches ==
- (Azerbaijan) Elshan Yusubov: 2022–2023
- (North Macedonia) Boban Mitev: 2023–2024
- (Lithuania) Rimas Kurtinaitis: 2024–2026
- (Serbia) Lazar Spasić: 2026–present
