= DeAndre Lansdowne =

American basketball player

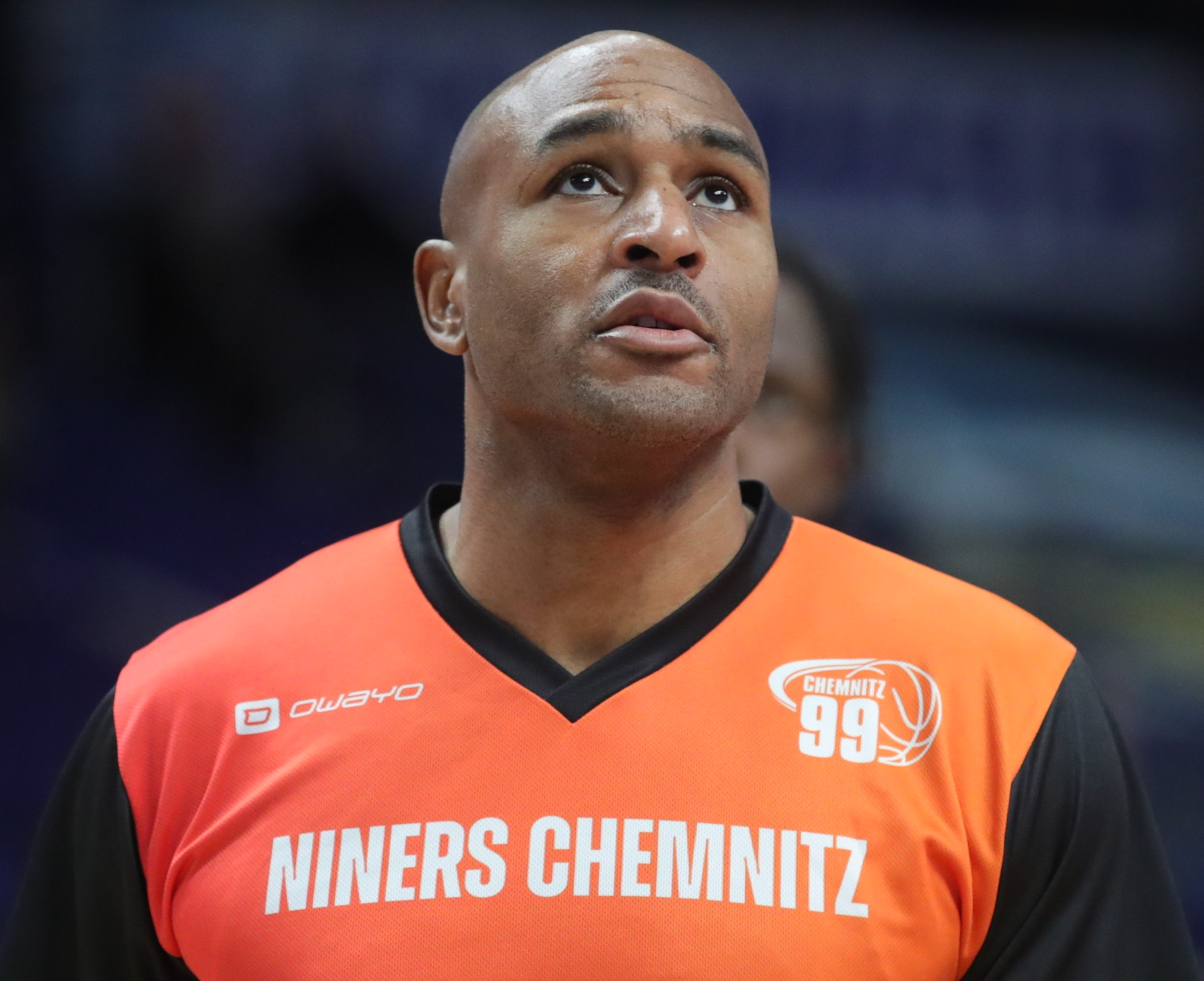
- Lansdowne playing for Niners Chemnitz in 2023

No. 9 – Rostock Seawolves
- Position: Shooting guard / point guard
- League: Basketball Bundesliga; EuroCup

Personal information
- Born: June 6, 1989 (age 37) Albuquerque, New Mexico, U.S.
- Listed height: 6 ft 2 in (1.88 m)
- Listed weight: 205 lb (93 kg)

Career information
- High school: Sandia (Albuquerque, New Mexico)
- College: Fort Lewis (2007–2011)
- NBA draft: 2011: undrafted
- Playing career: 2015–present

Career history
- 2015: Pioneros de Delicias
- 2015–2016: Hertener Löwen
- 2016–2017: Hamburg Towers
- 2017–2019: Löwen Braunschweig
- 2019–2020: Basket Brescia Leonessa
- 2020–2023: SIG Strasbourg
- 2023–2025: Niners Chemnitz
- 2025–present: Rostock Seawolves

Career highlights
- FIBA Europe Cup champion (2024); All-BCL Second Team (2023); Second-team All-BBL (2019); 2× First-team All-RMAC (2010–2011)

DeAndre John Lansdowne (born June 6, 1989) is an American professional basketball player for the Rostock Seawolves of the Basketball Bundesliga (BBL) and the EuroCup. He played high school basketball at Sandia High School in Albuquerque, and then played college basketball with the Fort Lewis Skyhawks in the NCAA Division II. After graduating in 2011, Lansdowne took a break from his basketball career until 2015, when he signed a contract with Pioneros de Delicias, a minor Mexican team. Later that same year he moved to Germany, where he spent 4 years playing at professional level; he obtained all-league honors in 2019 playing for Löwen Braunschweig. He also spent time in Italy and France.

== High school career ==
Lansdowne was born in Albuquerque, New Mexico; he was adopted at the age of six by John and Betty Lansdowne, since his biological mother was in prison, and his father was absent from his life. Lansdowne attended Sandia High School, where he played at the point guard and small forward positions; in his junior season in 2005–06 he averaged 4.9 rebounds and 3.7 assists per game, and was an All-Metro Honorable Mention. In his senior year with the Sandia Matadors, Lansdowne averaged 18 points, 11 rebounds and 4 assists per game, receiving All-Metro and All-District first team honors, and was named Metro Player of the Year. In addition to basketball, Lansdowne also played soccer at Sandia.

== College career ==
After graduating high school, Lansdowne decided to attend Fort Lewis College in Durango, Colorado, a program competing in the NCAA Division II. In his freshman year with the Fort Lewis Skyhawks, Lansdowne averaged 7.8 points, 2.9 rebounds and 1 assist per game, starting 1 out of 30 games, and was named RMAC West Division Freshman of the Year. In his sophomore season, Lansdowne was a preseason All-Division first team selection; he became a starter and increased his averages to 16 points, 4.9 rebounds and 2.5 assists per game. He was named RMAC West Division Player of the Week on February 2, 2009, and at the end of the season he was named RMAC West Division Defensive Player of the Year, and was selected in the All-RMAC West Division First Team and in the RMAC All-Tournament Team.

Before the start of his junior season, Lansdowne was named RMAC Preseason Player of the Year and a Preseason All-RMAC First Team selection. On January 30, 2010, he scored a career-high 35 points against New Mexico Highlands, and had two double-doubles, against Western New Mexico on January 21 and Adams State on February 23. On February 22 he was named West Division Player of the Week. He finished the season with averages of 21.7 points, 6.1 rebounds, 2.7 assists and 2 steals per game, and received several accolades: Daktronics All-Central Region First Rean, NABC All-Central Region Second Team, All-RMAC First Team and All-West Division First Team.

Landsowne was named a preseason Honorable Mention Division II All-American by The Sporting News, and was selected as preseason RMAC Player of the Year for the second year in a row. He started 31 out of 32 games and averaged 15.3 points, 4.8 rebounds, 2.1 assists and 2 steals per game for the season, recording two double-doubles for the season (on February 19 against Colorado Christian and on March 15 against Minnesota State). He was included in the All-Tournament Team and in the All-Central Region Second Team. Lansdowne is the Fort Lewis all-time top scorer with 1,861 points.

== Professional career ==
After graduating from Fort Lewis, Lansdowne had decided to try to play professional basketball, but the agency he had signed with did not receive calls about possible contracts for him, and he decided to continue his studies and he also started working as a bricklayer and laborer. After four years away from competitive basketball, Lansdowne received an offer from Pioneros de Delicias, a Mexican team playing in the Chihuahua State league (Liga de Básquetbol Estatal de Chihuahua, or LBE). Thanks to a YouTube video showing his highlights, Lansdowne was contacted by Hertener Löwen, a team of the city of Herten in Germany. Lansdowne played his first season in Europe in the ProB, the third tier of German basketball. In that season he scored a career-high 46 points on December 12, 2015, against EN Baskets Schwelm, and also had a 20-rebound game on March 19, 2016, again when playing EN Baskets Schwelm. In 22 games (all starts) in ProB, Lansdowne averaged 22.9 points (second in the league), 7.5 rebounds, 3.6 assists and 2.4 steals per game in 37.2 minutes per game.

His performances with Hertener Löwen attracted the interest of Hamburg Towers, which signed Lansdowne for the 2016–17 ProA season: Lansdowne therefore moved up one level, to the second tier of basketball in Germany. He played 27 games (24 starts) with the new club, and averaged 12.3 points, 5 rebounds, 2.3 assists and 1.3 steals per game in 28.1 minutes of average playing time. Hamburg Towers ended the season in 9th place, missing the playoffs by one spot.

On July 21, 2017, Lansdowne signed a contract with Löwen Braunschweig of the Basketball Bundesliga, the top basketball league of Germany. In his first season with the team, Lansdowne played 34 regular season games, averaging 14.7 points, 4.1 rebounds, 3.3 assists and 1.7 steals per game, playing an average of 32.5 minutes per game, shooting 38.4% on three-pointers. For the following season, Lansdowne increased his scoring average to 19.3 points over 32 regular season games: the team reached the playoffs, where Lansdowne received limited playing time (17 minutes per game) and averaged 7.5 points in 2 appearances. His performance during the season earned him a spot in the All-BBL Second Team.

On June 27, 2019, Lansdowne signed a contract with Italian Lega Basket Serie A team Basket Brescia Leonessa, coached by former NBA player Vincenzo Esposito. Lansdowne played 21 games in the 2019–20 LBA season, averaging 13.3 points, 3 rebounds and 1.6 assists in 27 minutes per game; he also had the chance to make his debut at international club level, and played 16 games in the 2019–20 EuroCup Basketball, where he averaged 10.2 points, 2.5 rebounds and 2.3 assists.

On June 8, 2020, Lansdowne signed a deal with SIG Strasbourg, a French team which competed in the LNB Pro A at domestic level and in the Basketball Champions League at international level. For three years, he served as team captain of the Strasbourg outfit. On June 26, 2023, Lansdowne put pen to paper on a contract with German Bundesliga side Niners Chemnitz.
