= Niners Chemnitz =

Professional basketball team in Chemnitz, Saxony, Germany

- Nickname: The Orange Army
- League: Basketball Bundesliga; EuroCup
- Founded: 1999; 27 years ago
- History: BV Chemnitz 99 (1999–2017); Niners Chemnitz (2017–present)
- Arena: Messe Chemnitz
- Capacity: 5,200
- Location: Chemnitz, Germany
- Team colors: Orange, red, white
- Head coach: Rodrigo Pastore
- Team captain: Darion Atkins
- Championships: 1 FIBA Europe Cup
- Website: www.chemnitz99.de
Home	Away

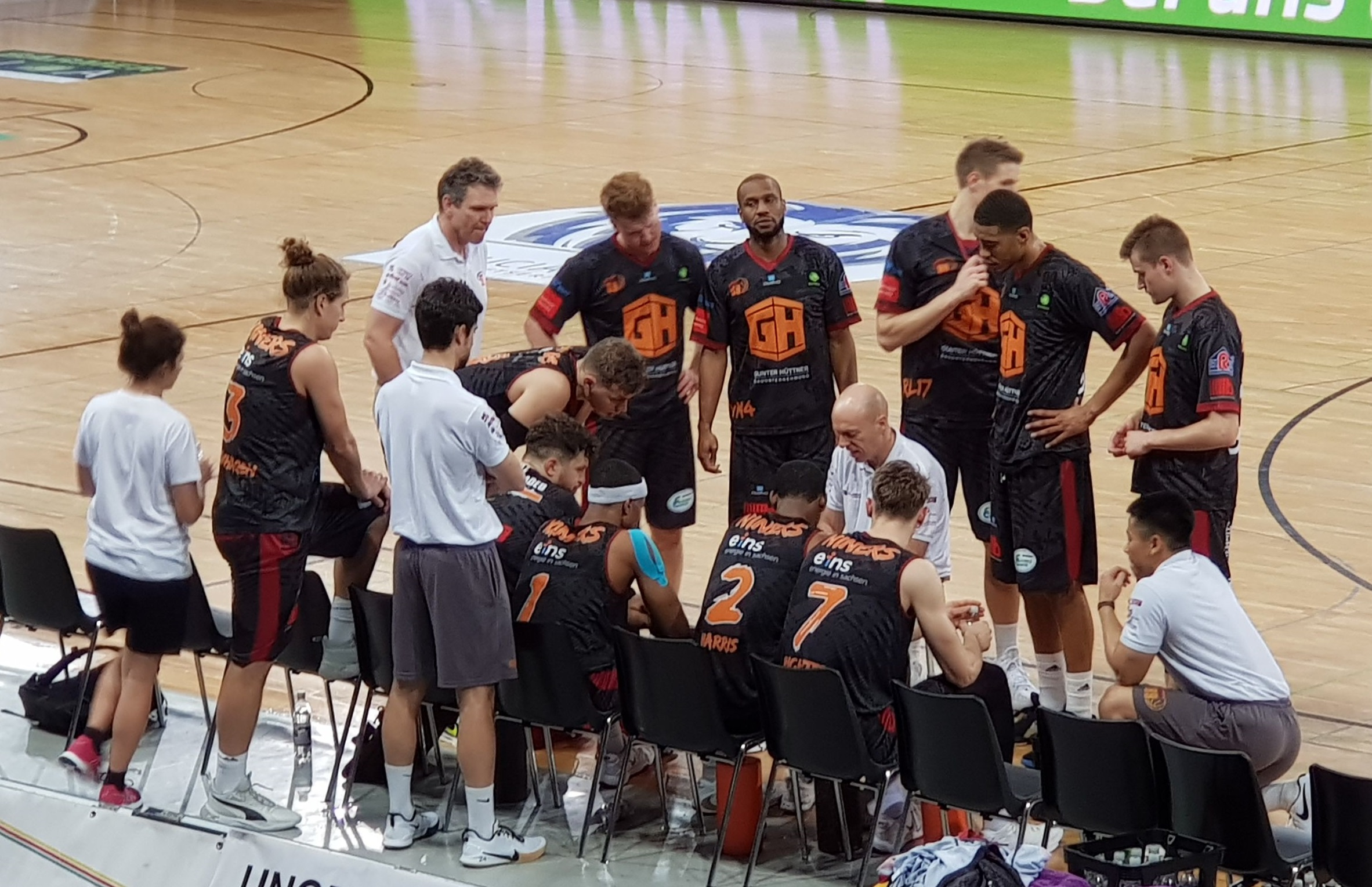
Niners Chemnitz in January 2020

Niners Chemnitz e.V., also known as Chemnitz 99, is a professional basketball club based in Chemnitz, Germany. Currently the team plays in the Basketball Bundesliga and in the EuroCup.

Since its foundation in 1999, the team has played in Germany's lower divisions but moved up second division ProA in 2002. It promoted to Germany's prime league Basketball Bundesliga for the first time in 2020. The Niners won the FIBA Europe Cup in 2024.

== History ==
The club was formed in 1999 as "BV Chemnitz 99" by the fusion of the clubs BG Chemnitz and Lok Chemnitz. In 2001, BV Chemnitz 99 began a cooperation with the Chemnitz University of Technology, which is why "TU" was added to the team name. In the summer of 2002, the division of the men's team (BV TU Chemnitz 99) and the women's team (Chemcats Chemnitz) followed. For the men's team, the nickname Niners evolved through the foundation year 1999.

On 28 May 2015, Chemnitz hired Argentine Rodrigo Pastore as new head coach. In 2017, the nickname Niners was officially adopted as new club name.

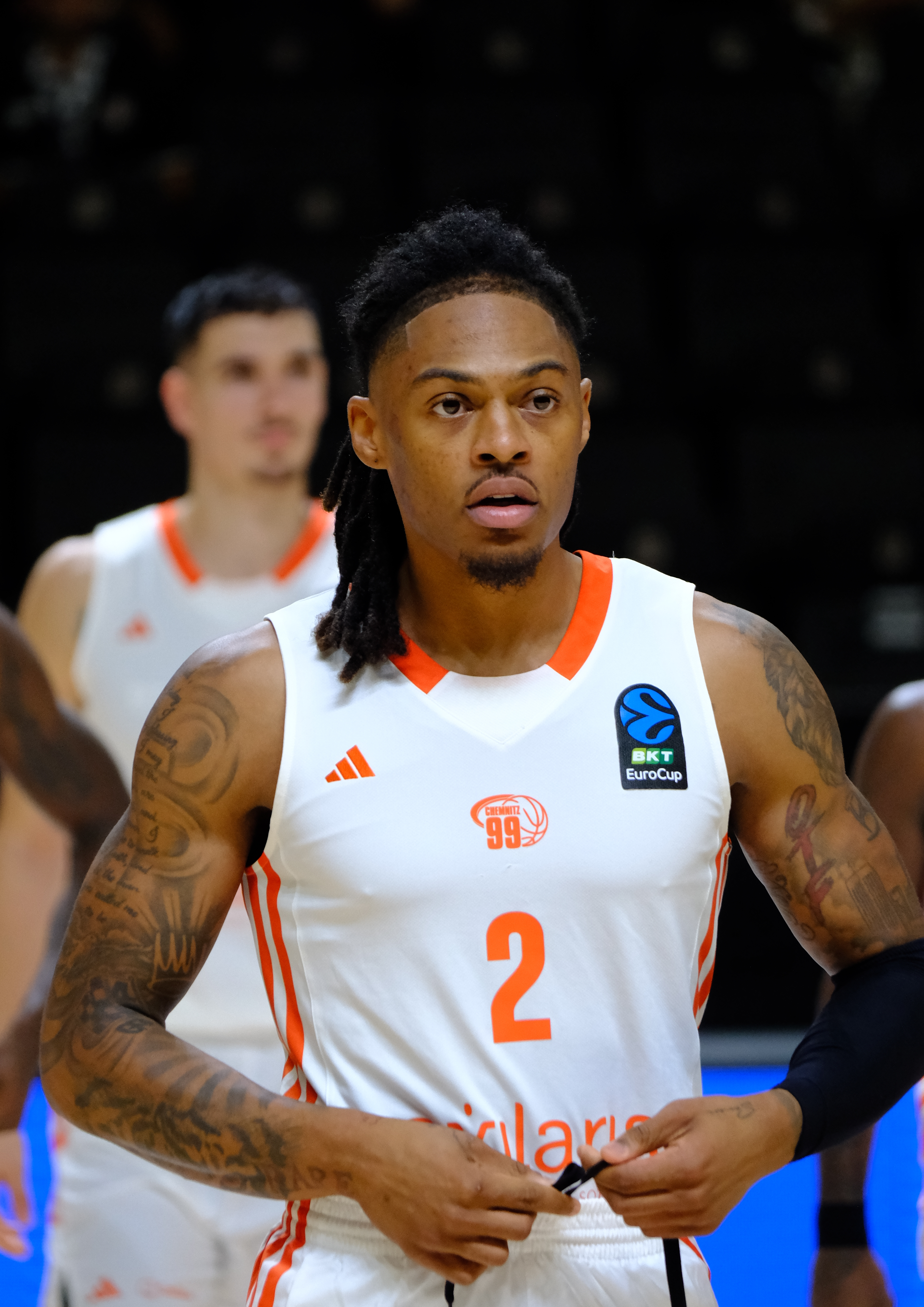
Nike Sibande with the Niners in 2025

In the 2019–20 season, Chemnitz was highly successful until the season was declared void due to the COVID-19 pandemic. Based on its first place in the standings, the Niners were promoted to the Basketball Bundesliga for the first time in club history.

The Niners entered the qualifying rounds of the 2022–23 Basketball Champions League, making their debut in European competition. In their second European season, the Niners won the 2023–24 FIBA Europe Cup championship, their first trophy in club history. They became the second German team to win the competition.

== Season by season ==
Season	Tier	League	Pos.	German Cup	European competitions	
2010–11	2	ProA	3rd			
2011–12	2	ProA	5th			
2012–13	2	ProA	10th			
2013–14	2	ProA	11th			
2014–15	2	ProA	13th			
2015–16	2	ProA	7th			
2016–17	2	ProA	3rd			
2017–18	2	ProA	11th			
2018–19	2	ProA	3rd			
2019–20	2	ProA	1st			
2020–21	1	Bundesliga	14th			
2021–22	1	Bundesliga	6th	Semifinals		
2022–23	1	Bundesliga	8th	Round of 16	Champions League	Qualification
2022–23	1	Bundesliga	8th	Round of 16	FIBA Europe Cup	Second round
2023–24	1	Bundesliga	3rd	Quarterfinals	FIBA Europe Cup	Champion
2024–25	1	Bundesliga	6th	Round of 16	Champions League	Play-ins
2025–26	1	Bundesliga	12th	Round of 16	2 EuroCup	Eighthfinals
2026–27	1	Bundesliga			2 EuroCup	

Source: Eurobasket.com

== Arenas ==
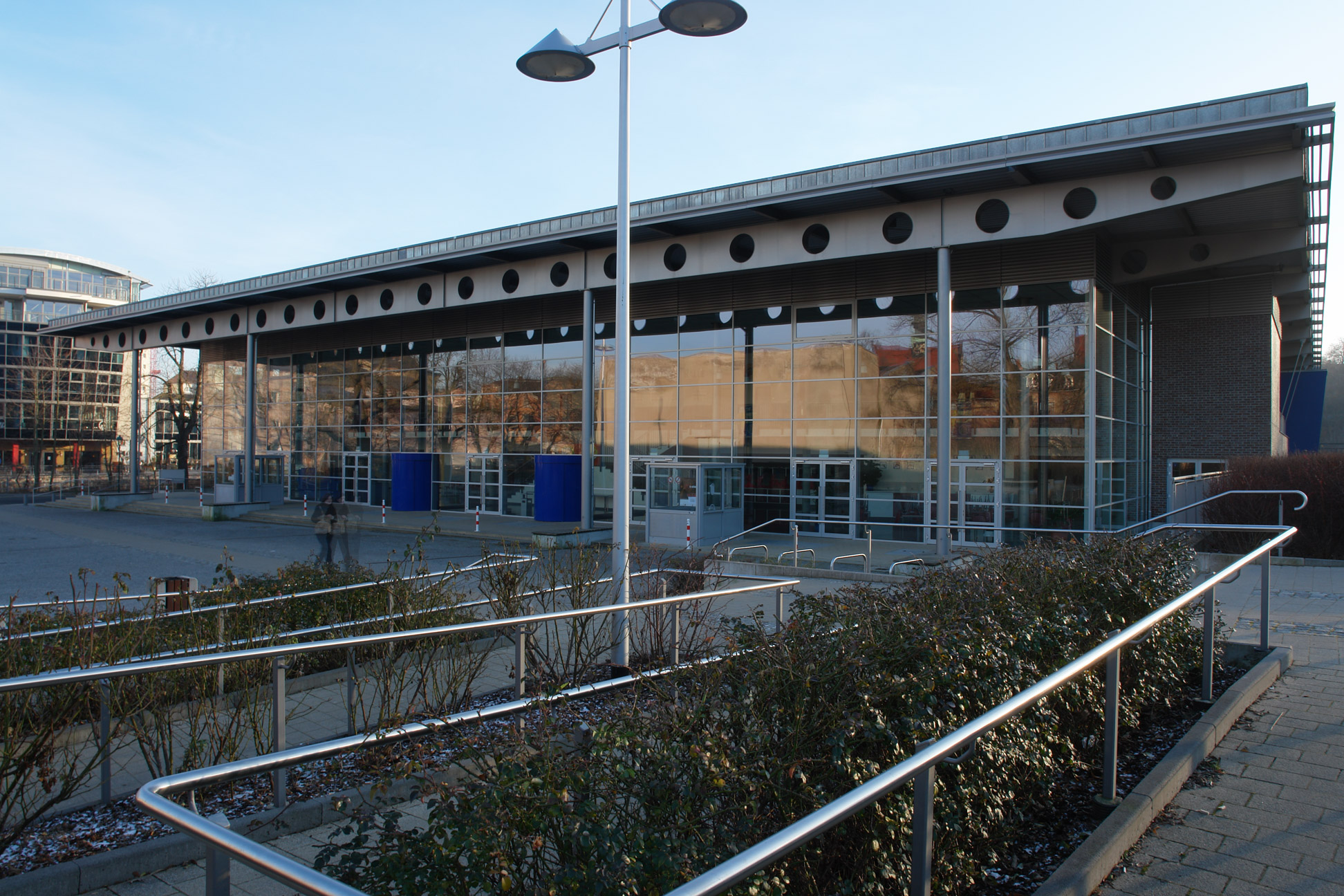
The Richard-Hartmann-Halle, first arena of the club

The first arena of Chemnitz 99 was the Richard-Hartmann-Halle, which had a maximum capacity of 2,000 people. Starting from the 2019–20 season, the team moved to the Chemnitz Arena, with a capacity of 5,200 people.

Arena	Years	Capacity
Richard-Hartmann-Halle	1999–2019	2,000
Messe Chemnitz	2019–present	5,200

== Players ==
=== Current roster ===
Note: Flags indicate national team eligibility at FIBA-sanctioned events. Players may hold other non-FIBA nationalities not displayed.

Niners Chemnitz roster
Players
Coaches

Pos.	No.	Nat.	Name	Ht.	Wt.	Age
G/F	1	(United States)	Fleming Jr., Phlandrous	1.93 m (6 ft 4 in)	96 kg (212 lb)	28 – 5 November 1998
G	2	(Canada) (Jamaica)	Smith, Stef	1.88 m (6 ft 2 in)	86 kg (190 lb)	27 – 27 June 1999
SG	6	(France)	Choupas, Yohan	1.93 m (6 ft 4 in)	88 kg (194 lb)	26 – 11 March 2000
SF	11	(Germany)	Rödl, Elias	1.98 m (6 ft 6 in)	93 kg (205 lb)	24 – 25 February 2002
SG	13	(Germany)	Kellig, Luca	1.92 m (6 ft 4 in)	83 kg (183 lb)	20 – 27 February 2006
F/C	17	(United States)	Atkins, Darion (C)	2.03 m (6 ft 8 in)	103 kg (227 lb)	34 – 17 September 1992
F	19	(Germany)	Milatz, Alfons	2.00 m (6 ft 7 in)	91 kg (201 lb)	19 – 19 September 2007
F	20	(United States)	King, Urald	1.98 m (6 ft 6 in)	98 kg (216 lb)	36 – 13 July 1990
PF	21	(Germany)	Šerić, Mateo	2.04 m (6 ft 8 in)	95 kg (209 lb)	27 – 21 March 1999
F/C	22	(United States)	Ceaser, Nighael	2.03 m (6 ft 8 in)	106 kg (234 lb)	26 – 3 February 2000
PG	24	(United States)	Williams, Cobe	1.83 m (6 ft 0 in)	84 kg (185 lb)	26 – 13 July 2000
F	25	(United States)	Burnham, Ben	2.01 m (6 ft 7 in)	100 kg (220 lb)	24 – 3 April 2002
C	27	(Germany)	Bock, Anton	2.09 m (6 ft 10 in)	96 kg (212 lb)	17 – 27 February 2009
F	33	(United States)	Mikesell, Ryan	2.01 m (6 ft 7 in)	96 kg (212 lb)	29 – 29 December 1996
PF	90	(Germany)	von Seckendorff, Jannis	2.04 m (6 ft 8 in)	96 kg (212 lb)	24 – 15 October 2002

Head coach

- (Argentina) Rodrigo Pastore

Assistant coach(es)

- (North Macedonia) Gjorgi Kočov
- (Spain) Pablo Del Tio Muñoz
- (Germany) David Gibson

Legend

- (C) Team captain
- Injured

- Roster
Updated: October 23, 2026

=== Notable players ===
Note: Flags indicate national team eligibility at FIBA-sanctioned events. Players may hold other non-FIBA nationalities not displayed.

Criteria

To appear in this section a player must have either:

- Set a club record or won an individual award while at the club
- Played at least one official international match for their national team at any time
- Played at least one official NBA match at any time.

- (Germany) Kevin Yebo
- (Canada) Kaza Kajami-Keane
- (Finland) Olivier Nkamhoua
- (Japan) Takumi Ishizaki
- (Kenya) Tylor Ongwae
- (Lithuania) Arnas Velička
- (Poland) Andrzej Mazurczak
- (United States) Jacob Gilyard
- (United States) George King
- (United States) DeAndre Lansdowne
- (United States) Jacob Parker
- (United States) Bradley Tinsley
- (United States) Hugh Robertson
- (United States) (Uganda) Nike Sibande

== Honours ==
FIBA Europe Cup

- Champions: 2023–24
