= Azerbaijan Basketball League =

Professional basketball league in Azerbaijan

- Founded: 1993; 33 years ago
- First season: 1993–94
- Country: Azerbaijan
- Confederation: FIBA Europe
- Number of teams: 12
- Level on pyramid: 1
- Supercup: Azerbaijan Super Cup
- Current champions: Sabah (4th title) (2025–26)
- Most championships: NTD Baku (9 titles)
- TV partners: IdmanTV
- Website: https://aze.basketball/
- 2025–26 Azerbaijan Basketball League

The Azerbaijan Basketball League (Azerbaijani: Azərbaycan Basketbol Liqası) is the top men's professional basketball league in Azerbaijan. ABL consists of 12 teams. The league is governed by the Azerbaijan Basketball Federation.

== Current clubs ==
Team	City	Stadium
Absheron Lions	Baku	Absheron Olympic Sport Complex
Gence BC	Gence	Ganja Olympic Sport Complex
Lenkaran BC	Lenkaran	Lenkaran Olympic Sports Center
Naxçivan BC	Baku	Saradchi Sports Center
Neftçi SC	Baku	Baku Sports Hall
NTD Baku	Baku	Baku Sports Hall
Ordu SC	Baku	Baku Sports Hall
Sabah BC	Baku	Baku Sports Hall
Serhedçi BC	Baku	Saradchi Sports Center
Sumqayıt BC	Sumqayıt	Sumgait Sports Hall
Sheki BC	Sheki	Shaki Olympic Sports Complex
Quba BC	Quba	Guba Olympic Sport Complex

== League Finals ==
Year	Champions	Score	Runner up
1993–94	Mahsul Baku		
1994–95	Mahsul Baku		
1995–96	Mahsul Baku		
1996–97	Anarbank Baku		
1997–98	Azans Baku		
1998–99	Azans Baku		
1999–2000	Bakılı		
2000–01	Qarb Universiteti		
2001–02	NTD Baku		
2002–03	Gala Baku		
2003–04	Gala Baku		
2004–05	Gala Baku		
2005–06	Gala Baku		
2006–07	NTD Baku		
2007–08	NTD Baku		
2008–09	NTD Baku		
2009–10	NTD Baku		
2010–11	NTD Baku	2–0	Gala Baku
2011–12	Gala Baku	3–1	NTD Baku
2012–13	Gala Baku	2–0	Gyandzha
2013–14	Gala Baku	League	Şəki
2014–15	Gala Baku	2–1	Aztop Baku
2015–16	Aztop Baku	2–0	NTD Baku
2016–17	NTD Baku	2–0	80–ies
2017–18	NTD Baku	2–0	80–ies
2018–19	NTD Baku	2–0	Aztop Baku
2019–20	Zirvə Astara	– (Note: Zirvə Astara declared champion through regular season standings after the premature ending of the league due to the COVID-19 pandemic.)	Atom
2020–21	Cancelled		
2021–22	Cancelled		
2022–23	Sabah	3–2	Gəncə Ganja
2023–24	Sabah	3–1	Xəzri BK
2024–25	Sabah	4–2	Neftçi
2025–26	Sabah	3–0	Absheron Lions

== Performance by club ==
Clubs in bold currently play in the top division.

Club	Winners	Runners-up	Years won
**NTD Baku**	9	2	2002, 2007, 2008, 2009, 2010, 2011, 2017, 2018, 2019
Gala Baku	8	1	2003, 2004, 2005, 2006, 2012, 2013, 2014, 2015
**Sabah**	4	—	2023, 2024, 2025, 2026
Mahsul Baku	3	—	1994, 1995, 1996
Azans Baku	2	—	1998, 1999
Aztop Baku	1	2	2016
Anarbank Baku	1	—	1997
Bakılı	1	—	2000
Qarb Universiteti	1	—	2001
**Zirve Astara**	1	—	2020
80–ies	—	2	
**Absheron Lions**	—	1	
Gyandzha	—	1	
Şəki	—	1	
Atom	—	1	
Gəncə Ganja	—	1	
**Neftçi**	—	1	
