= Basketball Champions League Game Day MVP =

Award of the Basketball Champions League

The Basketball Champions League (BCL) Game Day MVP (Most Valuable Player) is the award given to the Basketball Champions League's best player of each game day of the season. Each game on the Basketball Champions League's season schedule is considered to be an individual round, or "game day". The award began with the Basketball Champions League's inaugural 2016–17 season. The Basketball Champions League is, along with the EuroCup, one of the two secondary level European-wide professional club basketball leagues in Europe. The award is given by FIBA.

== Selection criteria ==
After each game day, a selection of five players with the highest efficiency ratings, is made by the Basketball Champions League. Afterwards, the official website, championsleague.basketball, decides which player is crowned Game Day MVP.

== 2016–17 Basketball Champions League season ==
- Player nationalities by national team:

Regular Season

Game Day	Player	Team	EFF	Ref.
1	(United States) Tyrone Brazelton	(Poland) Rosa Radom	30	
2	(United States) Joe Ragland	(Italy) Sidigas Avellino	29	
3	(Azerbaijan) Shaquielle McKissic	(Turkey) Muratbey Uşak Sportif	24	
4	(Greece) Vlado Janković	(Greece) Aris	25	
5	(United States) Nick Minnerath	(Russia) Avtodor	40	
6	(Greece) Georgios Bogris	(Spain) Iberostar Tenerife	28	
7	(Ukraine) Kyrylo Fesenko	(Italy) Sidigas Avellino	35	
8	(United States) Jimmy Baron	(Lithuania) Neptūnas	40	
9	(Serbia) Novica Veličković	(Serbia) Partizan NIS	21	
10	(Canada) Daniel Mullings	(Finland) Kataja	25	
11	(Greece) Zach Auguste	(Turkey) Muratbey Uşak Sportif	36	
12	(United States) Chris Kramer	(Germany) EWE Baskets Oldenburg	36	
13	(United States) Martin Zeno	(Romania) Oradea	40	
14	(United States) Nick Minnerath (2)	(Russia) Avtodor	27	

Playoffs Qualifiers MVP

Player	Team	Ref.
(Georgia (country)) Thaddus McFadden	(Greece) PAOK	

Round of 16 MVP

Player	Team	Ref.
(United States) Mike Green	(Turkey) Pınar Karşıyaka	

Quarterfinals MVP

Player	Team	Ref.
(North Macedonia) Jordan Theodore	(Turkey) Banvit	

Final Four MVP

Player	Team	Ref.
(Lithuania) Marius Grigonis	(Spain) Iberostar Tenerife	

== 2017–18 Basketball Champions League season ==
- Player nationalities by national team:

Regular Season

Round	Player	Team	EFF	Ref.
1	(United States) Jarrod Jones	(Turkey) Pınar Karşıyaka	33	
2	(United States) Adam Smith	(France) Élan Chalon	31	
3	(United States) Byron Allen	(Germany) EWE Baskets Oldenburg	26	
4	(United States) Adonis Thomas	(Turkey) Banvit	23	
5	(United States) D. J. Kennedy	(Turkey) Pınar Karşıyaka	35	
6	(Lithuania) Arnas Butkevičius	(Lithuania) Neptūnas	42	
7	(United States) Corey Walden	(Israel) Hapoel Holon	30	
8	(Greece) Lefteris Bochoridis	(Greece) Aris	32	
9	(United States) Jamal Shuler	(France) Nanterre 92	26	
10	(Kosovo) Dardan Berisha	(Czech Republic) ČEZ Nymburk	24	
11	(United Kingdom) Ovie Soko	(Spain) UCAM Murcia	31	
12	(Bulgaria) Dee Bost	(France) SIG Strasbourg	30	
13	(Croatia) Goran Suton	(Spain) Movistar Estudiantes	34	
14	(United States) Manny Harris	(Greece) AEK Athens	31	

Round of 16

Player	Team	EFF	Ref.
(United States) Manny Harris (2)	(Greece) AEK Athens	34 / 32	

== 2018–19 Basketball Champions League season ==
- Player nationalities by national team:

Regular Season

Gameday	Player	Team	EFF	Ref.
1	(United States) Norris Cole	(Italy) Sidigas Scandone	28	
2	(United States) Austin Daye	(Italy) Umana Reyer Venezia	33	
3	(United States) Norris Cole (2)	(Italy) Sidigas Scandone	33	
4	(United States) Vince Hunter	(Greece) AEK Athens	39	
5	(Dominican Republic) James Feldeine	(Israel) Hapoel Jerusalem	39	
6	(United States) Julian Gamble	(France) Nanterre 92	34	
7	(Greece) Linos Chrysikopoulos	(Greece) PAOK	25	
8	(United States) Malcolm Griffin	(Greece) AEK Athens	34	
9	(United States) Paris Lee	(Belgium) Telenet Giants Antwerp	35	
10	(United States) Jason Rich	(Turkey) Beşiktaş Sompo Japan	27	
11	(United States) Marcos Knight	(Germany) MHP Riesen Ludwigsburg	39	
12	(United States) Vince Hunter (2)	(Greece) AEK	37	
13	(United States) Vince Hunter (3)	(Greece) AEK	39	
14	(France) Amath M'Baye	(Italy) Segafredo Virtus Bologna	27	

Round of 16

Player	Team	EFF	Ref.
(Montenegro) Tyrese Rice	(Germany) Brose Bamberg	14 / 28	

Quarterfinals

Player	Team	EFF	Ref.
(United States) Tim Abromaitis	(Spain) Iberostar Tenerife	21 / 26	

== 2019–20 Basketball Champions League season ==
- Player nationalities by national team:

Regular Season

Gameday	Player	Team	EFF	Ref.
1	(Canada) Dyshawn Pierre	(Italy) Dinamo Sassari	35	
2	(United States) (Israel) Adrian Banks	(Italy) Happy Casa Brindisi	31	
3	(Dominican Republic) James Feldeine	(Israel) Hapoel Jerusalem	27	
4	(Netherlands) Nicolas de Jong	(France) Pau-Lacq-Orthez	30	
5	(Canada) Kyle Wiltjer	(Turkey) Türk Telekom	33	
6	(United States) Adam Smith	(Greece) PAOK	28	
7	(Hungary) Zoltán Perl	(Hungary) Falco Vulcano	26	
8	(United States) Brandon Brown	(Russia) Nizhny Novgorod	28	
9	(Cuba) Howard Sant-Roos	(Greece) AEK	25	
10	(United States) TaShawn Thomas	(Israel) Hapoel Jerusalem	32	
11	(United States) J'Covan Brown	(Israel) Hapoel Jerusalem	31	
12	(Germany) Robin Benzing	(Spain) Casademont Zaragoza	30	
13	(United States) TaShawn Thomas	(Israel) Hapoel Jerusalem	38	
14	(United States) Earl Clark	(Spain) San Pablo Burgos	28	

== See also ==
- Basketball Champions League MVP
- Basketball Champions League Final Four MVP
- Basketball Champions League Star Lineup
- Basketball Champions League Top Scorer
- Basketball Champions League Best Young Player
