= Basketball Champions League Defensive Player of the Year =

The Basketball Champions League Defensive Player of the Year is an annual award given to the top defensive player of each season's edition of the Basketball Champions League (BCL), which is the premier professional basketball competition organized by FIBA Europe. The award was officially introduced prior to the conclusion of the 2022–23 season.

== Winners ==
Season	Player	Position	Nationality	Club	Ref.
2022–23	Alberto Díaz	PG	Spain	Unicaja	
2023–24	Howard Sant-Roos	SF	Cuba	UCAM Murcia	
2024–25	Alberto Díaz (2)	PG	Spain	Unicaja	
2025–26	Kendrick Perry	PG	United States / Montenegro	Unicaja	

== Awards by player ==
Rank	Player	Total	Years
1	(Spain) Alberto Díaz	2	2023, 2025
2	(Cuba) Howard Sant-Roos	1	2024
2	(United States) Kendrick Perry	1	2026

== Awards by club ==
Rank	Club	Total	Years
1	Unicaja Málaga	3	2023, 2025, 2026
2	UCAM Murcia	1	2024

== See also ==
- Basketball Champions League Awards
- Basketball Champions League MVP
- Basketball Champions League Final Four MVP
- Basketball Champions League Best Young Player
- Basketball Champions League Star Lineup
