= Basketball Champions League Star Lineup =

Award of the Basketball Champions League

The Basketball Champions League Star Lineup, or FIBA Champions League Star Lineup, is an annual award for the Basketball Champions League (BCL)'s top ten basketball players for each season. The Basketball Champions League is, along with the EuroCup, one of the two secondary level European-wide professional club basketball leagues in Europe. The award is given by FIBA. The award began in conjunction with the league's inaugural season, the 2016–17 Basketball Champions League.

== Voting criteria ==
The Star Lineup is chosen by a vote of the fans online, a vote of media journalists and representatives, and a vote of all of the head coaches of all of the teams in each season of the league. The fans, the media, and the league's head coaches each get 1/3 of the vote distribution.

== Star Lineup by season ==
Player (X)	Denotes the number of times the player was selected to either the First or Second Team.
**Bold**	Denotes the player who was named Basketball Champions League MVP.

Player nationalities by national team:

Season	First team		Second team		Ref.
Season	Players	Teams	Players	Teams	Ref.
2016–17	(North Macedonia) **Jordan Theodore**	(Turkey) Banvit	(United States) Will Hatcher	(Serbia) Partizan	
2016–17	(Bosnia and Herzegovina) Zack Wright	(France) Monaco	(United States) Chris Kramer	(Germany) Oldenburg	
2016–17	(Canada) Melvin Ejim	(Italy) Reyer Venezia	(Lithuania) Gediminas Orelik	(Turkey) Banvit	
2016–17	(Canada) Aaron Doornekamp	(Spain) Iberostar Tenerife	(Greece) Dušan Šakota	(Greece) AEK Athens	
2016–17	(Greece) Georgios Bogris	(Spain) Iberostar Tenerife	(Serbia) Vladimir Štimac	(Turkey) Beşiktaş	
2017–18	(United States) **Manny Harris**	(Greece) AEK Athens	(United States) Gabe York	(Germany) Bayreuth	
2017–18	(United States) D. J. Kennedy	(Turkey) Karşıyaka	(United States) Kendrick Ray	(Czech Republic) Nymburk	
2017–18	(United Kingdom) Ovie Soko	(Spain) UCAM Murcia	(United States) Christopher Evans	(France) Monaco	
2017–18	(France) Louis Labeyrie	(France) SIG Strasbourg	(Greece) Dušan Šakota (2)	(Greece) AEK Athens	
2017–18	(Bosnia and Herzegovina) Elmedin Kikanović	(France) Monaco	(Slovenia) Gašper Vidmar	(Turkey) Banvit	
2018–19	(Montenegro) **Tyrese Rice**	(Germany) Bamberg	(Cameroon) Paris Lee	(Belgium) Antwerp Giants	
2018–19	(United States) Kevin Punter	(Italy) Virtus Bologna	(Dominican Republic) James Feldeine	(Israel) Hapoel Jerusalem	
2018–19	(United States) Tim Abromaitis	(Spain) Canarias	(United Kingdom) Ovie Soko	(Spain) UCAM Murcia	
2018–19	(United States) Vince Hunter	(Greece) AEK Athens	(France) Amath M'Baye	(Italy) Virtus Bologna	
2018–19	(Belgium) Ismaël Bako	(Belgium) Telenet Giants Antwerp	(United States) Colton Iverson	(Spain) Canarias	
2019–20	(Brazil) Marcelinho Huertas	(Spain) Canarias	(Jamaica) Dylan Ennis	(Spain) Zaragoza	
2019–20	(United States) **Keith Langford**	(Greece) AEK Athens	(Brazil) Vítor Benite	(Spain) Burgos	
2019–20	(Czech Republic) Vojtěch Hruban	(Czech Republic) Nymburk	(Canada) Dyshawn Pierre	(Italy) Dinamo Sassari	
2019–20	(United States) TaShawn Thomas	(Israel) Hapoel Jerusalem	(Canada) Kyle Wiltjer	(Turkey) Türk Telekom	
2019–20	(Georgia (country)) Giorgi Shermadini	(Spain) Canarias	(France) Moustapha Fall	(Turkey) Türk Telekom	
2020–21	(United States) C.J. Harris	(Israel) Hapoel Holon	(Jamaica) Dylan Ennis (2)	(Spain) Zaragoza	
2020–21	(United States) Kasey Shepherd	(Russia) Nizhny Novgorod	(Italy) Darius Thompson	(Italy) New Basket Brindisi	
2020–21	(United States) **Bonzie Colson**	(France) SIG Strasbourg	(Cuba) Jasiel Rivero	(Spain) San Pablo Burgos	
2020–21	(United States) Raymar Morgan	(Turkey) Karşıyaka	(United States) Omar Prewitt	(Czech Republic) Nymburk	
2020–21	(Georgia (country)) Giorgi Shermadini (2)	(Spain) Canarias	(United States) Michale Kyser	(Latvia) VEF Rīga	
2021–22	(United States) Joe Ragland	(Israel) Hapoel U-NET Holon	(Brazil) Marcelinho Huertas (2)	(Spain) Lenovo Tenerife	
2021–22	(Montenegro) Jonah Radebaugh	(Germany) MHP RIESEN Ludwigsburg	(Georgia (country)) Joe Thomasson	(Spain) Baxi Manresa	
2021–22	(Nigeria) **Chima Moneke**	(Spain) Baxi Manresa	(United States) DeVaughn Akoon-Purcell	(Turkey) Galatasaray Nef	
2021–22	(United States) Chris Johnson	(Israel) Hapoel U-NET Holon	(United States) Elijah Stewart	(Romania) U-BT Cluj-Napoca	
2021–22	(Georgia (country)) Giorgi Shermadini (3)	(Spain) Lenovo Tenerife	(Croatia) Ivan Buva	(Lithuania) Rytas Vilnius	
2022–23	(Brazil) Marcelinho Huertas (3)	(Spain) Lenovo Tenerife	(United States) Marcus Foster	(Lithuania) Rytas Vilnius	
2022–23	(North Macedonia) **T. J. Shorts**	(Germany) Telekom Baskets Bonn	(Montenegro) Kendrick Perry	(Spain) Unicaja	
2022–23	(Spain) Darío Brizuela	(Spain) Unicaja	(United States) DeAndre Lansdowne	(France) SIG Strasbourg	
2022–23	(Panama) Akil Mitchell	(Greece) AEK Athens	(United States) Levi Randolph	(Israel) Hapoel Bank Yahav Jerusalem	
2022–23	(United States) Zach Hankins	(Israel) Hapoel Bank Yahav Jerusalem	(Georgia (country)) Giorgi Shermadini (4)	(Spain) Lenovo Tenerife	
2023–24	(United States) Joe Ragland (2)	(Greece) Peristeri	(Jamaica) Dylan Ennis (3)	(Spain) UCAM Murcia	
2023–24	(Brazil) **Marcelo Huertas** (4)	(Spain) Lenovo Tenerife	(United States) Hunter Hale	(Greece) Promitheas	
2023–24	(Montenegro) Kendrick Perry (2)	(Spain) Unicaja	(United States) Levi Randolph (2)	(Israel) Hapoel Bank Yahav Jerusalem	
2023–24	(Bulgaria) David Kravish	(Spain) Unicaja	(Germany) Dylan Osetkowski	(Spain) Unicaja	
2023–24	(United States) Austin Wiley	(Turkey) Tofaş	(United States) Vernon Carey Jr.	(Turkey) Pınar Karşıyaka	
2024–25	(Brazil) **Marcelo Huertas** (5)	(Spain) Lenovo Tenerife	(Montenegro) Kendrick Perry (3)	(Spain) Unicaja	
2024–25	(United States) Hunter Hale (2)	(Greece) AEK Betsson	(United States) Will Cummings	(Turkey) Galatasaray	
2024–25	(United States) James Palmer	(Turkey) Galatasaray	(United States) Desi Rodriguez	(France) Nanterre 92	
2024–25	(Germany) Dylan Osetkowski (2)	(Spain) Unicaja	(United States) Derrick Alston Jr.	(Spain) Baxi Manresa	
2024–25	(France) Ismaël Kamagate	(Italy) Bertram Derthona Tortona	(Armenia) Steven Enoch	(Lithuania) Rytas Vilnius	
2025–26	(Spain) Ricky Rubio	(Spain) Joventut Badalona	(Brazil) Marcelo Huertas (6)	(Spain) Lenovo Tenerife	
2025–26	(Poland) Jerrick Harding	(Lithuania) Rytas Vilnius	(United States) Errick McCollum	(Turkey) Galatasaray MCT Technic	
2025–26	(United States) **Frank Bartley**	(Greece) AEK Betsson	(Germany) Jack Kayil	(Germany) Alba Berlin	
2025–26	(United States) RaiQuan Gray	(Greece) AEK Betsson	(Dominican Republic) Chris Duarte	(Spain) Unicaja	
2025–26	(Georgia (country)) Giorgi Shermadini (5)	(Spain) Canarias	(Lithuania) Artūras Gudaitis	(Lithuania) Rytas Vilnius	

== All-Decade Team ==
First team	Second team	Ref.
(Montenegro) Kendrick Perry	(United States) Joe Ragland	
(Brazil) Marcelo Huertas	(Brazil) Vítor Benite	
(United States) Kevin Punter	(United States) Levi Randolph	
(Czech Republic) Vojtěch Hruban	(United States) Tim Abromaitis	
(Georgia (country)) Giorgi Shermadini	(Serbia) Dejan Kravić	
Coach of the Decade: (Spain) Txus Vidorreta

== See also ==
- Basketball Champions League MVP
- Basketball Champions League Final Four MVP
- Basketball Champions League Top Scorer
- Basketball Champions League Best Young Player
- Basketball Champions League Game Day MVP
