= Basketball Champions League Awards =

The Basketball Champions League Awards are the awards given to the top individual performers of each season's edition of Basketball Champions League. The Basketball Champions League is FIBA Europe's highest competition. Initially, FIBA established EuroLeague in 1958 but never trademarketed the name which was later taken over by Euroleague Basketball. The Basketball Champions League involves 52 teams. The award is given by FIBA. The awards have existed since the Basketball Champions League's inaugural 2016–17 season.

== Basketball Champions League awards ==
The awards are given out each season and include:

=== Basketball Champions League MVP ===
The Basketball Champions League MVP award began with the 2016–17 season.

=== Basketball Champions League Final Four MVP ===
The Basketball Champions League Final Four MVP award began with the 2016–17 season.

=== Basketball Champions League Game Day MVP ===
The Basketball Champions League Game Day MVP award began with the 2016–17 season.

=== Basketball Champions League Top Scorer ===
The Basketball Champions League Top Scorer award began with the 2016–17 season.

=== Basketball Champions League Best Young Player ===
The Basketball Champions League Best Young Player award began with the 2016–17 season.

=== Basketball Champions League Star Lineups ===
The Basketball Champions League Star Lineup award began with the 2016–17 season.

=== Basketball Champions League Defensive Player of the Year ===
The Basketball Champions League Defensive Player of the Year award began with the 2022–23 season.

== See also ==
- EuroLeague Awards
- EuroCup Basketball Awards
