= Yoan Makoundou =

French basketball player (born 2000)

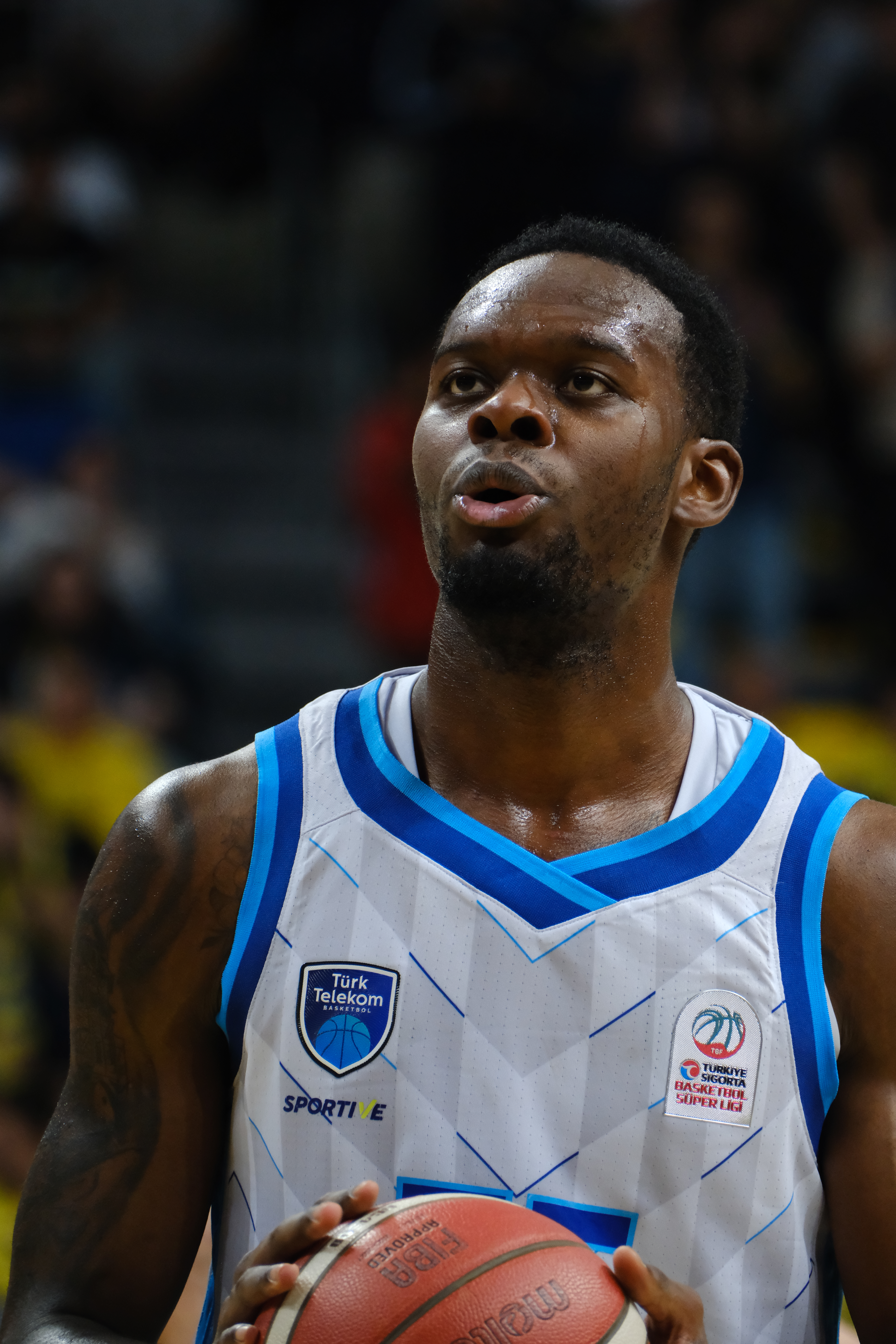
- Makoundou with Türk Telekom in 2025

No. 55 – FC Barcelona
- Position: Center / power forward
- League: Liga ACB; EuroLeague

Personal information
- Born: 9 August 2000 (age 26) Melun, France
- Listed height: 2.07 m (6 ft 9 in)
- Listed weight: 102 kg (225 lb)

Career information
- Playing career: 2019–present

Career history
- 2019–2022: Cholet
- 2022–2026: AS Monaco
- 2023–2024: →Budućnost
- 2024–2025: →Türk Telekom
- 2026: Fujian Sturgeons
- 2026: AS Monaco
- 2026–present: FC Barcelona

Career highlights
- FIBA Champions League Best Young Player (2021); 2× French League champion (2023, 2026); French Cup winner (2023)
Medals
Men's basketball
Representing France
FIBA Under-19 World Cup
Bronze medal – third place	2019 Greece	Team

Yoan Maurice Junior Makoundou (born 9 August 2000) is a French professional basketball player FC Barcelona of the Liga ACB and the EuroLeague.

== Early life and youth career ==
Makoundou began playing basketball with his local club US Melun and moved to Marne-la-Vallée Basket in 2016. One year later, he joined the youth academy of Cholet Basket. He helped his team win titles in the LNB Espoirs, the French under-21 league, in 2018 and 2019.

== Professional career ==
On 10 July 2020, Makoundou signed his first professional contract, a three-year deal with Cholet of the LNB Pro A. On 20 January 2021, he recorded 20 points and eight rebounds in an 89–71 loss to Hapoel Holon. After averaging 10.4 points and 5.2 rebounds per game in the 2020–21 Basketball Champions League, he was named Champions League Best Young Player.

=== AS Monaco (2022–2026) ===
Makoundou signed a four-year deal with AS Monaco on July 23, 2022.

In September 2023, Makoundou was loaned out to Budućnost of the Montenegrin Prva A Liga, the ABA League and the EuroCup until the end of the season.

On July 1, 2024, he signed with Türk Telekom of the Basketbol Süper Ligi (BSL), again on loan from Monaco.

On March 5, 2026, AS Monaco announced it had reached an agreement with Makoundou to terminate the player's contract. On March 10, 2026, he signed with Fujian Sturgeons of the Chinese Basketball Association (CBA).

On May 14, 2026, Makoundou returned to AS Monaco.

=== FC Barcelona (2026–present) ===
On August 22, 2026, Makoundou signed with FC Barcelona of the Liga ACB and the EuroLeague on a two-season contract.

== National team career ==
Makoundou represented France at the 2019 FIBA Under-19 Basketball World Cup in Greece. He averaged four points and 2.4 rebounds per game, helping his team win the bronze medal.

== Career statistics ==
Legend
GP	Games played	GS	Games started	MPG	Minutes per game
FG%	Field-goal percentage	3P%	3-point field-goal percentage	FT%	Free-throw percentage
RPG	Rebounds per game	APG	Assists per game	SPG	Steals per game
BPG	Blocks per game	PPG	Points per game	PIR	Performance index rating
**Bold**	Career high

=== EuroLeague ===
Year	Team	GP	GS	MPG	FG%	3P%	FT%	RPG	APG	SPG	BPG	PPG	PIR
2022–23	Monaco	8	0	9.5	.455	.200	.800	2.8	.4	.3	.5	4.4	4.3
2025–26	Monaco	5	0	7.4	.714	.000	.917	1.8	–	.4	.2	6.2	7.6
Career		13	0	8.5	.585	.167	.882	2.4	.2	.3	.4	5.1	5.5

=== EuroCup ===
Year	Team	GP	GS	MPG	FG%	3P%	FT%	RPG	APG	SPG	BPG	PPG	PIR
2023–24	Budućnost	17	9	23.3	.608	.406	.757	4.8	.8	.8	.8	11.0	12.6
2024–25	Türk Telekom	20	12	22.8	.500	.317	.842	4.9	.9	.5	1.7	11.3	12.4
Career		37	21	22.5	.554	.356	.809	4.8	.9	.6	1.3	11.1	12.5
