= Kendrick Perry =

American basketball player (born 1992)

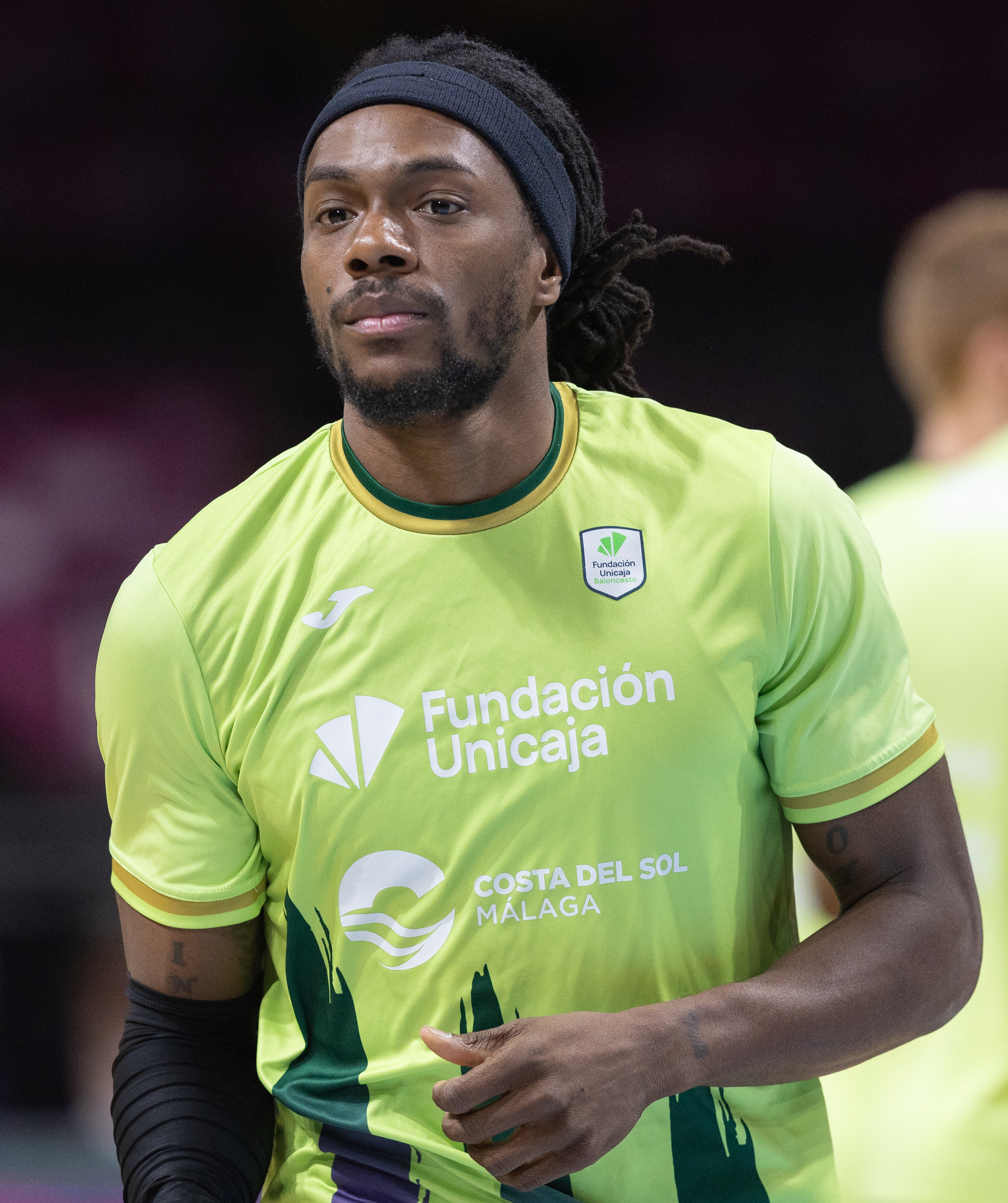
- Perry with Unicaja in 2026

No. 55 – Unicaja Málaga
- Position: Point guard
- League: Liga ACB

Personal information
- Born: December 23, 1992 (age 33) Ocoee, Florida, U.S.
- Listed height: 6 ft 1 in (1.85 m)
- Listed weight: 180 lb (82 kg)

Career information
- High school: Edgewater (Orlando, Florida)
- College: Youngstown State (2010–2014)
- NBA draft: 2014: undrafted
- Playing career: 2014–present

Career history
- 2014–2015: Sydney Kings
- 2015: Iowa Energy
- 2015–2016: Körmend
- 2016–2017: Karpoš Sokoli
- 2017–2018: Szolnoki Olaj
- 2018–2019: Nizhny Novgorod
- 2019: Metropolitans 92
- 2019–2020: Mega
- 2020–2021: Cedevita Olimpija
- 2021–2022: Panathinaikos
- 2022: Budućnost
- 2022–present: Unicaja Málaga

Career highlights
- 2× FIBA Intercontinental Cup champion (2024, 2025); 2× FIBA Champions League champion (2024, 2025); FIBA Champions League Final Four MVP (2024); All-FIBA Champions League First Team (2024); 2× All-FIBA Champions League Second Team (2023, 2025); FIBA Champions League Defensive Player of the Year (2026); FIBA Champions League All-Decade First Team (2026); 2× Spanish Cup winner (2023, 2025); Spanish Cup Finals MVP (2025); Spanish Supercup winner (2024); All-Liga ACB Second Team (2025); Greek Super Cup winner (2021); Montenegrin League champion (2022); Slovenian League champion (2021); Slovenian League Finals MVP (2021); Slovenian Supercup winner (2020); Macedonian Cup winner (2017); Hungarian Cup winner (2016); 3× First-team All-Horizon League (2012–2014); 2× Horizon League All-Defensive Team (2013, 2014)

Kendrick Dennard Perry (born December 23, 1992) is an American-born naturalized Montenegrin professional basketball player for Unicaja Málaga of the Spanish Liga ACB. He played college basketball at Youngstown State University.

== High school career ==
Perry attended Edgewater High School in Orlando, Florida where he was a three-year letter winner and a two-time captain. As a senior, he averaged 16 points and eight assists per game, helping Edgewater to the FHSAA District 6A-4 championship. He was a second-team Class 6A selection by the Florida Sports Writers and a third-team choice by FloridaHoops.com. He was also first-team all-area and all-metro area selection.

== College career ==
In his freshman season at Youngstown State, Perry scored in double figures in 15 games with a then career-high 21-point performance against Loyola on January 27, 2011. In 30 games (23 starts), he averaged 9.0 points, 3.6 rebounds, 4.1 assists and 1.3 steals in 29.2 minutes per game.

In his sophomore season, he was named to the All-Horizon League first team and the NABC All-District second team. In 31 games (all starts), he averaged 16.8 points, 3.3 rebounds, 3.9 assists and 2.4 steals in 34.8 minutes per game.

In his junior season, he was named to the All-Horizon League first team and the NABC All-District first team. In 30 games (29 starts), he averaged 17.3 points, 5.5 rebounds, 4.1 assists and 1.9 steals in 35.4 minutes per game.

In his senior season, he was named to the All-Horizon League first team for the third year in a row. He was also named to the NABC All-District first team and the Capital One Academic All-America second team. On March 4, 2014, he tied a career-high 35 points in the first round of the Horizon League Tournament against Oakland. In 32 games (all starts), he averaged 21.3 points, 4.1 rebounds, 4.4 assists and 2.4 steals in 36.5 minutes per game.

== Professional career ==
=== 2014–15 season ===
After going undrafted in the 2014 NBA draft, Perry joined the Orlando Magic for the 2014 NBA Summer League. On July 23, 2014, he signed with the Sydney Kings for the 2014–15 NBL season. In 28 games for the Kings, Perry averaged 10.4 points, 3.6 rebounds, 2.4 assists and 1.1 steals per game.

On March 19, 2015, Perry was acquired by the Iowa Energy of the NBA Development League. He made his debut for the Energy the following day, scoring two points in 15 minutes of action in a win over the Fort Wayne Mad Ants.

=== Europe ===
On August 12, 2015, Perry signed with BC Körmend of the Hungarian Nemzeti Bajnokság I/A.

On September 6, 2016, Perry signed with Macedonian club Karpoš Sokoli for the 2016–17 season. On July 3, 2018, he signed with Nizhny Novgorod. On July 20, 2019, he has signed with Levallois Metropolitans of the LNB Pro A.

On December 18, 2019, Perry signed with Mega Bemax of the ABA League. On May 22, 2020, he signed with Cedevita Olimpija.

On June 30, 2021, he signed with Panathinaikos of the Greek Basket League and the EuroLeague. In 19 EuroLeague games, Perry played 16.4 minutes per contest and averaged a paltry 4.8 points, 1.7 rebounds, and 1.6 assists, shooting with 32.1% from the field and 32.6% from beyond the 3-point arc.

On January 23, 2022, Perry transferred from Panathinaikos to the Montenegrin club Budućnost VOLI for the rest of the season.

On June 13, 2022, Perry signed with Unicaja of the Spanish Liga ACB. In December 2024, Perry and the team reached an agreement for a contract extension until 2027.

== National team career ==
While playing in Montenegro in 2022, Perry obtained Montenegrin citizenship, enabling him to play for Montenegro's national team. Perry represented Montenegro in EuroBasket 2022 and in the 2023 FIBA World Cup, where in 4 games he averaged 13.5 points and 5.5 assists in 26 minutes.

== Personal ==
Perry is the son of Deborah and Aubrey Perry Jr., and has a brother also named Aubrey.
