= RaiQuan Gray =

American basketball player (born 1999)

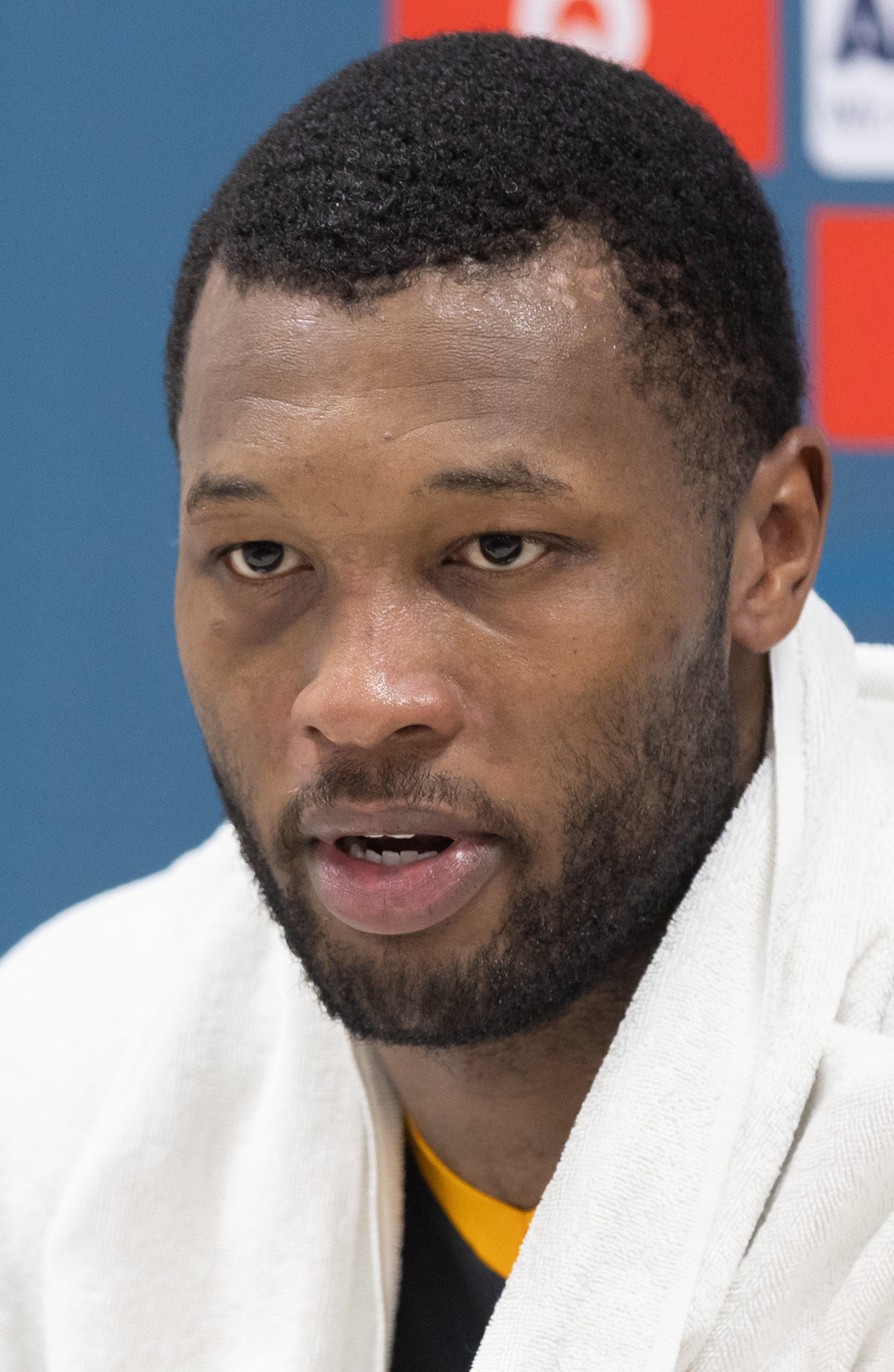
- Gray with AEK Athens in 2026

No. 0 – PAOK Thessaloniki
- Position: Power forward / center
- League: Greek Basketball League; EuroCup

Personal information
- Born: July 7, 1999 (age 27) Parkland, Florida, U.S.
- Listed height: 6 ft 7 in (2.01 m)
- Listed weight: 269 lb (122 kg)

Career information
- High school: Dillard (Fort Lauderdale, Florida)
- College: Florida State (2018–2021)
- NBA draft: 2021: 2nd round, 59th overall pick
- Drafted by: Brooklyn Nets
- Playing career: 2021–present

Career history
- 2021–2023: Long Island Nets
- 2023: Brooklyn Nets
- 2023–2024: Austin Spurs
- 2024: San Antonio Spurs
- 2024: →Austin Spurs
- 2024–2026: AEK Athens
- 2026–present: PAOK Thessaloniki

Career highlights
- All-FIBA Champions League First Team (2026); Third-team All-ACC (2021)
- Stats at NBA.com
- Stats at Basketball Reference

RaiQuan Kelvan Gray (born July 7, 1999) is an American professional basketball player for PAOK Thessaloniki of the Greek Basketball League (GBL) and the EuroCup. He played college basketball for the Florida State Seminoles.

== Early life ==
Gray grew up playing football and started playing basketball at age nine. He attended Dillard High School in Fort Lauderdale, Florida. Gray played the point guard position despite being 6 feet 8 inches (2.03 m) and 260 pounds (120 kg). As a junior, he led Dillard to the Class 6A state title. In his senior season, Gray won the Class 7A state title. He committed to playing college basketball for Florida State over offers from Baylor and Memphis.

== College career ==
Gray redshirted his first year at Florida State. As a freshman, he averaged 3.9 points in 12.3 minutes per game. Gray averaged six points and 3.8 rebounds per game as a sophomore. He improved his conditioning in the offseason. On February 13, 2021, he recorded a career-high 24 points and 12 rebounds in a 92–85 win over Wake Forest. As a junior, Gray averaged 11.9 points, 6.4 rebounds and 2.2 assists per game, earning Third Team All-Atlantic Coast Conference honors. On April 2, 2021, he declared for the 2021 NBA draft, forgoing his remaining college eligibility.

== Professional career ==
=== Brooklyn / Long Island Nets (2021–2023) ===
Gray was selected in the second round of the 2021 NBA draft with the 59th pick by the Brooklyn Nets. Gray was later included in the roster of the Nets for the 2021 NBA Summer League. On October 25, 2021, Gray was included in the training camp roster of the Long Island Nets, Brooklyn's NBA G League affiliate.

On September 26, 2022, Gray signed with the Brooklyn Nets, but was waived on October 15. On November 4, Gray was named to the opening-night roster for the Long Island Nets.

On April 8, 2023, Gray signed a two-way contract with the Brooklyn Nets. On April 9 he made his NBA debut in the Nets' final regular-season game, scoring 16 points, with 9 rebounds and 7 assists. However, he was waived on July 18.

=== San Antonio / Austin Spurs (2023–2024) ===
On September 27, 2023, Gray signed with the San Antonio Spurs, but was waived two days later. On October 31, he joined the Austin Spurs and on March 2, 2024, he signed a two-way contract with San Antonio.

On July 8, 2024, Gray was traded to the Chicago Bulls in a three-team trade also including the Sacramento Kings and on July 13, he was waived by the Bulls.

=== AEK Athens (2024–2026) ===
On September 22, 2024, Gray signed with AEK Athens of the Greek Basket League. On August 1, 2025, Gray renewed his contract with AEK for one more season. On March 26, 2026, he was named the MVP of the Round of 16 of the BCL.

=== PAOK Thessaloniki (2026–present) ===
On June 11, 2026, Gray signed with PAOK Thessaloniki of the Greek Basket League.

== Career statistics ==
Legend
GP	Games played	GS	Games started	MPG	Minutes per game
FG%	Field goal percentage	3P%	3-point field goal percentage	FT%	Free throw percentage
RPG	Rebounds per game	APG	Assists per game	SPG	Steals per game
BPG	Blocks per game	PPG	Points per game	**Bold**	Career high

=== NBA ===
==== Regular season ====
Year	Team	GP	GS	MPG	FG%	3P%	FT%	RPG	APG	SPG	BPG	PPG
2022–23	Brooklyn	1	0	**35.1**	.500	.400	1.000	**9.0**	**7.0**	.0	**1.0**	**16.0**
2023–24	San Antonio	**3**	0	13.0	**.588**	**.429**	—	2.3	2.0	**.3**	.3	7.7
Career		4	0	18.5	.552	.417	1.000	4.0	3.3	.3	.5	9.8

=== College ===
Year	Team	GP	GS	MPG	FG%	3P%	FT%	RPG	APG	SPG	BPG	PPG
2017–18	Florida State	Redshirt										
2018–19	Florida State	**36**	4	12.3	.435	**.313**	.721	2.3	.8	.8	.2	3.9
2019–20	Florida State	29	**24**	19.5	.392	.220	.696	3.8	1.4	1.1	**.7**	6.0
2020–21	Florida State	25	**24**	**26.3**	**.517**	.267	**.763**	**6.4**	**2.2**	**1.2**	**.7**	**11.9**
Career		90	52	18.5	.458	.262	.732	3.9	1.4	1.0	.5	6.8

== Personal life ==
Gray has a sister and a brother. His cousin, Quinn Gray, played in the National Football League (NFL) as a quarterback before embarking on a coaching career. Gray's nickname is "Turk".
