= Manny Harris =

American basketball player (born 1989)

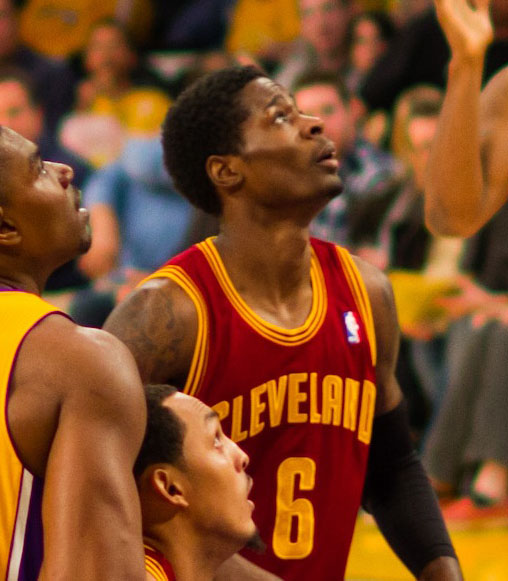
- Harris with the Cleveland Cavaliers in 2011

Personal information
- Born: September 21, 1989 (age 37) Detroit, Michigan, U.S.
- Listed height: 6 ft 5 in (1.96 m)
- Listed weight: 185 lb (84 kg)

Career information
- High school: Redford (Detroit, Michigan)
- College: Michigan (2007–2010)
- NBA draft: 2010: undrafted
- Playing career: 2010–2023
- Position: Shooting guard

Career history
- 2010–2012: Cleveland Cavaliers
- 2011–2012: → Canton Charge
- 2012–2013: Azovmash
- 2013–2014: Los Angeles D-Fenders
- 2014: Los Angeles Lakers
- 2014: Türk Telekom
- 2015: Eskişehir
- 2015–2016: Texas Legends
- 2016: Türk Telekom
- 2016–2017: Anhui Dragons
- 2017: Dallas Mavericks
- 2017: → Texas Legends
- 2017–2018: AEK Athens
- 2018: Rytas Vilnius
- 2018–2019: Bahçeşehir Koleji
- 2019: NLEX Road Warriors
- 2020: Hapoel Holon
- 2020–2021: Shandong Heroes
- 2021: AEK Athens
- 2022: Kaohsiung Steelers
- 2023: Hapoel Holon
- 2023: Merkezefendi Bld. Denizli Basket
- 2023: Al Ittihad Alexandria
- 2023: Al Riyadi Beirut

Career highlights
- FIBA Champions League champion (2018); FIBA Champions League MVP (2018); BCL Star Lineup Best Team (2018); Greek Cup winner (2018); Greek Cup Finals MVP (2018); Greek League All Star (2018); NBL champion (2016); NBA D-League All-Star (2014); First-team All-Big Ten (2009); Second-team All-Big Ten (2008); Third-team All-Big Ten (2010); Big Ten All-Freshman team (2008); Mr. Basketball of Michigan (2007)
- Stats at NBA.com
- Stats at Basketball Reference

Corperryale Lādorable "Manny" Harris (born September 21, 1989) is an American former professional basketball player who last played for Al Riyadi Beirut of the Lebanese Basketball League. He has previously played for the Los Angeles Lakers, Cleveland Cavaliers, and Dallas Mavericks of the National Basketball Association (NBA), and is a former All-Big Ten Conference guard who played three seasons for the Michigan Wolverines.

He decided to forgo his final year of collegiate eligibility and declare himself eligible for the 2010 NBA draft, but went undrafted. He signed with the Cavaliers of the National Basketball Association (NBA). He began his second year injured and rehabbed for two months in the NBA D-League with Cavaliers' affiliate, the Canton Charge, before being re-signed by the Cavaliers. He signed with BC Azovmash of Ukraine in September 2012 and spent 2012–13 playing in the Ukrainian Basketball SuperLeague. For the following two seasons he split time in the NBA, NBA D-League and in the Turkish Basketball Super League. He is an NBA D-League All-star and six-time D-League performer of the week. He has set single-game scoring records for the Legends, Charge and D-Fenders franchises.

At Michigan, he was a 2008–09 first team All-Big Ten Conference selection, a 2007–08 second team All-Big Ten selection and a 2009–10 third team All-Big Ten selection. Harris also earned Big Ten Academic All-Conference honors as both a sophomore and a junior after the 2008–09 and 2009–10 Big Ten Conference regular seasons. Harris began the 2009–10 NCAA Division I men's basketball season by recording the second triple double in school history.

Harris previously attended Redford High School in Detroit, Michigan, where he won the state's Mr. Basketball award as a senior. Harris is one of only five Big Ten Conference basketball players to have finished in the top ten in the conference in scoring, rebounding, and assist average in the same season and prior to Evan Turner's 2009–10 season, Harris' 2008–09 season was the only time a player had finished in the top six of all three categories.

== High school ==
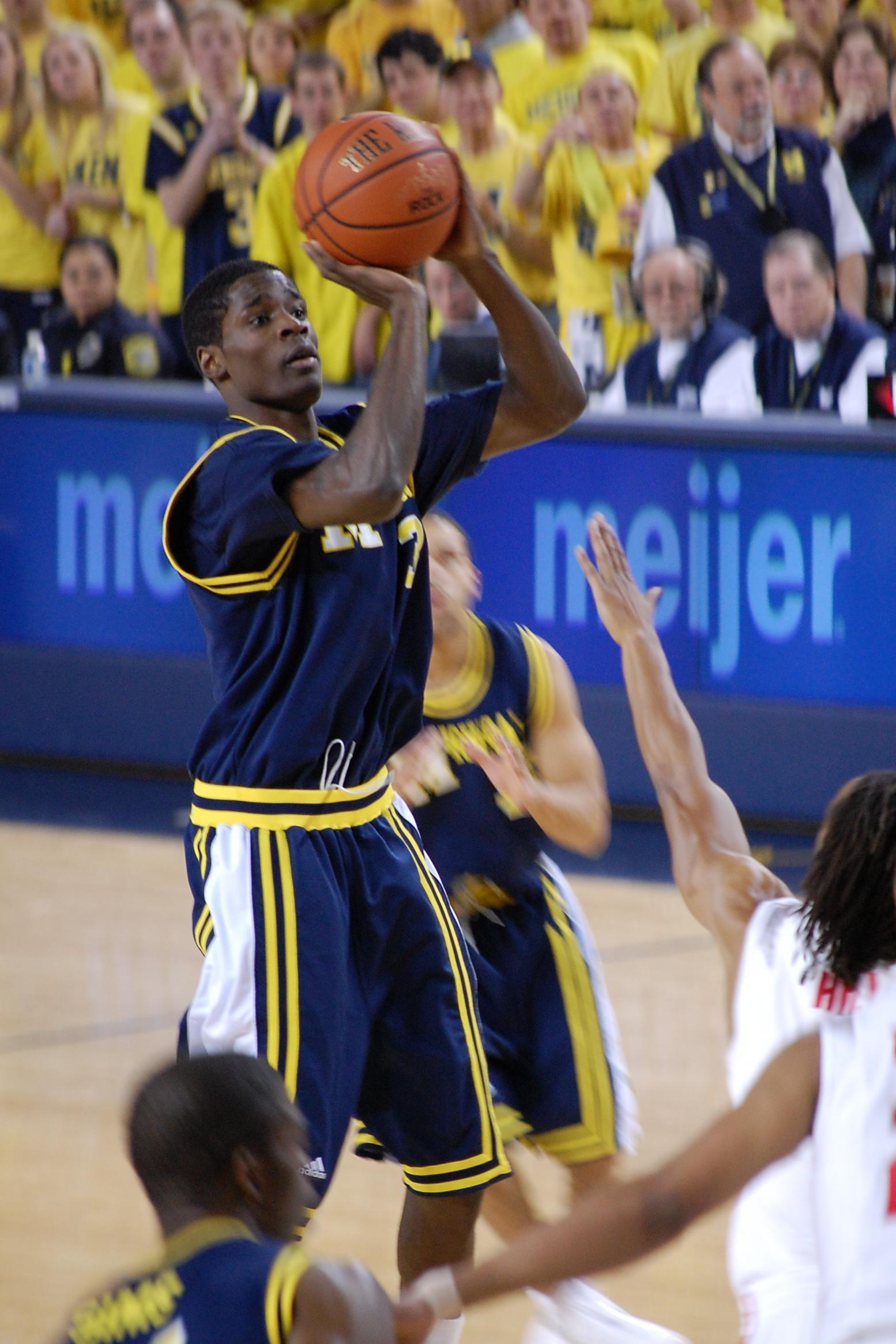
Harris takes a jump shot vs. Ohio State in a 1989 Michigan Championship throwback uniform on January 17, 2009

Born in Detroit, Michigan, Harris was a 2005 Class A All-State fifth team selection as a sophomore by The Detroit News. He was an Associated Press Class A All-State first team selection in each of the next two seasons. Harris was selected as the 2007 Mr. Basketball of Michigan. That season he led the Redford to the Michigan High School Athletic Association Class A championship game, which it lost to Saginaw High School. During his high school basketball career, he became the first player to start for three consecutive Detroit Public School League championship teams since Jalen Rose and Voshon Lenard had done so from 1989 to 1991. At Redford, Harris once recorded 52 points and 15 rebounds. During the 2006–07 season, his last at Redford, Harris averaged 33.5 points, 11.5 rebounds and 5.5 assists. Harris was highly recruited, receiving offers from Tennessee, UCLA, Wisconsin, George Washington, and Indiana before committing to the University of Michigan. He was ranked by Rivals.com as the sixth-best shooting guard in the country in the 2007 high school class, while Scout.com ranked him the twelfth-best shooting guard. ESPN ranked him #7, but they listed him as a point guard. When Michigan announced that it would replace Tommy Amaker with John Beilein as head coach, Harris was initially unsure if he would honor his signed letter of intent, but when Michigan re-signed assistant coach Mike Jackson, he again decided to attend the school.

College recruiting
Name	Hometown	School	Height	Weight	Commit date
Manny Harris; SG	Detroit, Michigan	Redford (MI)	6 ft 4 in (1.93 m)	165 lb (75 kg)	Jul 10, 2006
Manny Harris; SG	Recruit ratings: Scout: Rivals:				
Manny Harris; PG	Detroit, Michigan	Redford (MI)	6 ft 4 in (1.93 m)	190 lb (86 kg)	Jul 10, 2006
Manny Harris; PG	Recruit ratings: (97)				
Overall recruit ranking: Scout: 12 (SG) Rivals: 34, 6 (SG) ESPN: 38, 7 (PG)
Note: In many cases, Scout, Rivals, 247Sports, On3, and ESPN may conflict in their listings of height and weight.; In these cases, the average was taken. ESPN grades are on a 100-point scale.; Sources: "Michigan Basketball Commitments". Rivals.; "2007 Michigan Basketball Commits". Scout.; "ESPN". ESPN.; "Scout.com Team Recruiting Rankings". Scout.; "2007 Team Ranking". Rivals.

== College career ==
2007–08 Michigan Wolverines men's basketball Big Ten Season
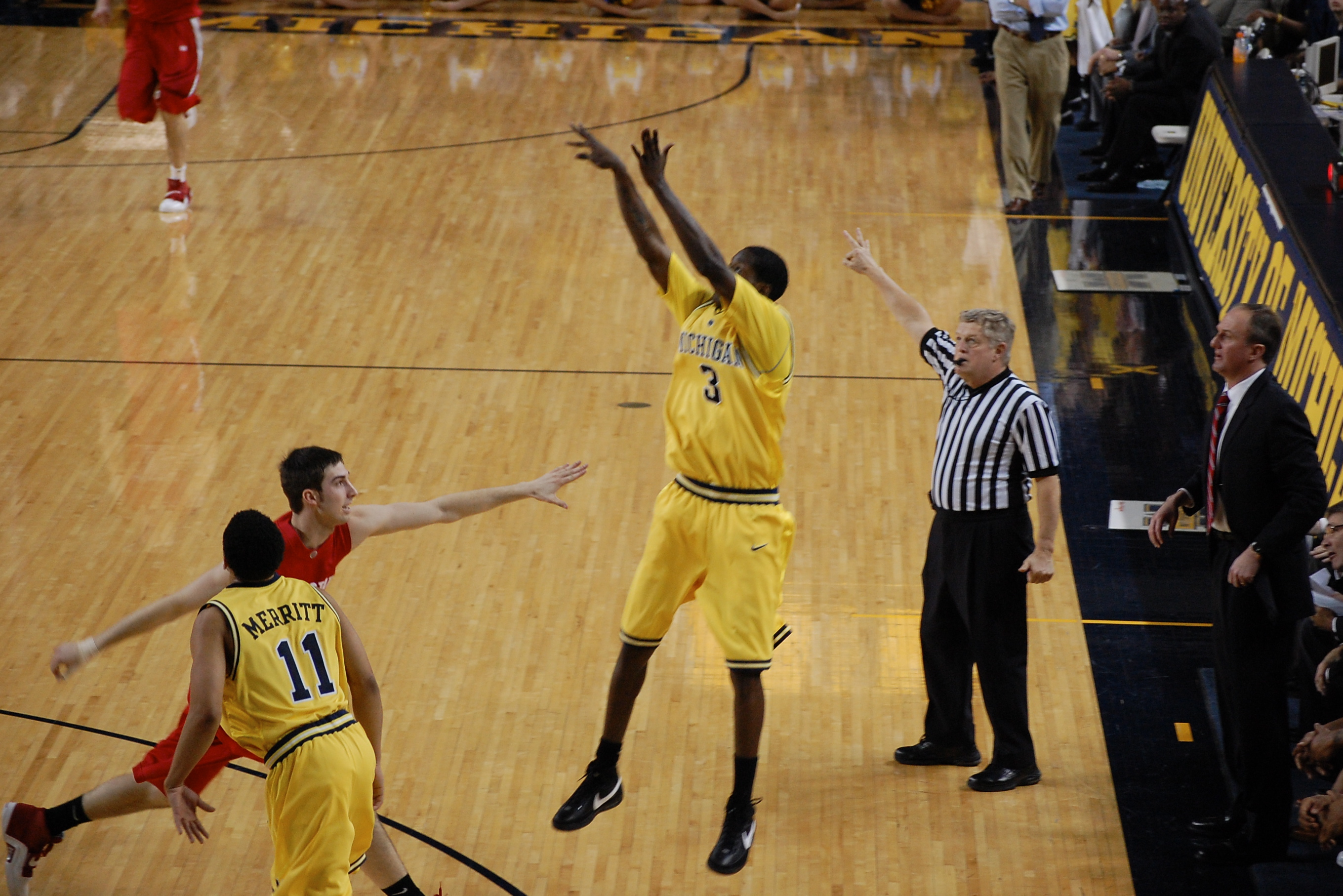
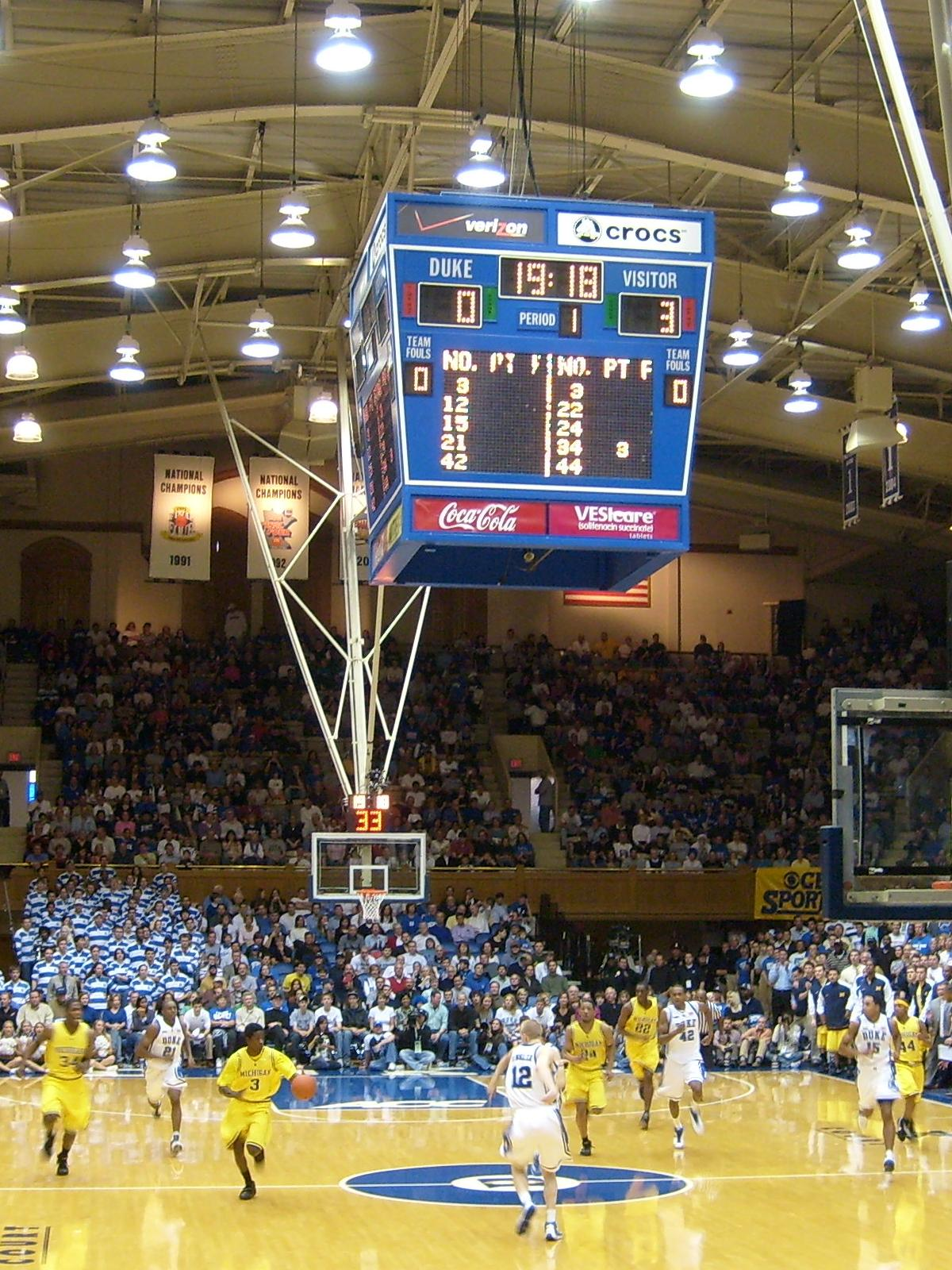
Top: Harris shoots a three-pointer vs. Ohio State on February 16, 2008; Bottom: Harris dribbles the ball upcourt vs. Duke on December 8, 2007

=== Freshman year ===
Prior to the 2007–08 basketball season, Freshman Harris was selected as a second team pre-season All-Big Ten Conference selection. He started every game for the 2007–08 Michigan Wolverines men's basketball team. He scored 13 points and tallied 4 steals in his debut on November 9 against Radford. After the 2007–08 NCAA basketball season, Harris was selected as a second team All-Big Ten Conference selection and an All-Freshman team selection. He led the Wolverines in scoring (16.4), assists (2.8), steals (1.5), minutes (32.9) and free throw percentage (82.0). Among his highlights during the season were being named to the Great Alaska Shootout tournament team, becoming the fourth U-M freshman to score over 500 points in first season (516), and setting the U-M freshman record for free throws made in a season while playing at least 20 minutes and starting every game. During the season, he keyed the first three-game winning streak of the season for the team, which earned him his first Big Ten Player of the Week Award.

=== Sophomore year ===
2008–09 Michigan Wolverines men's basketball Big Ten Season
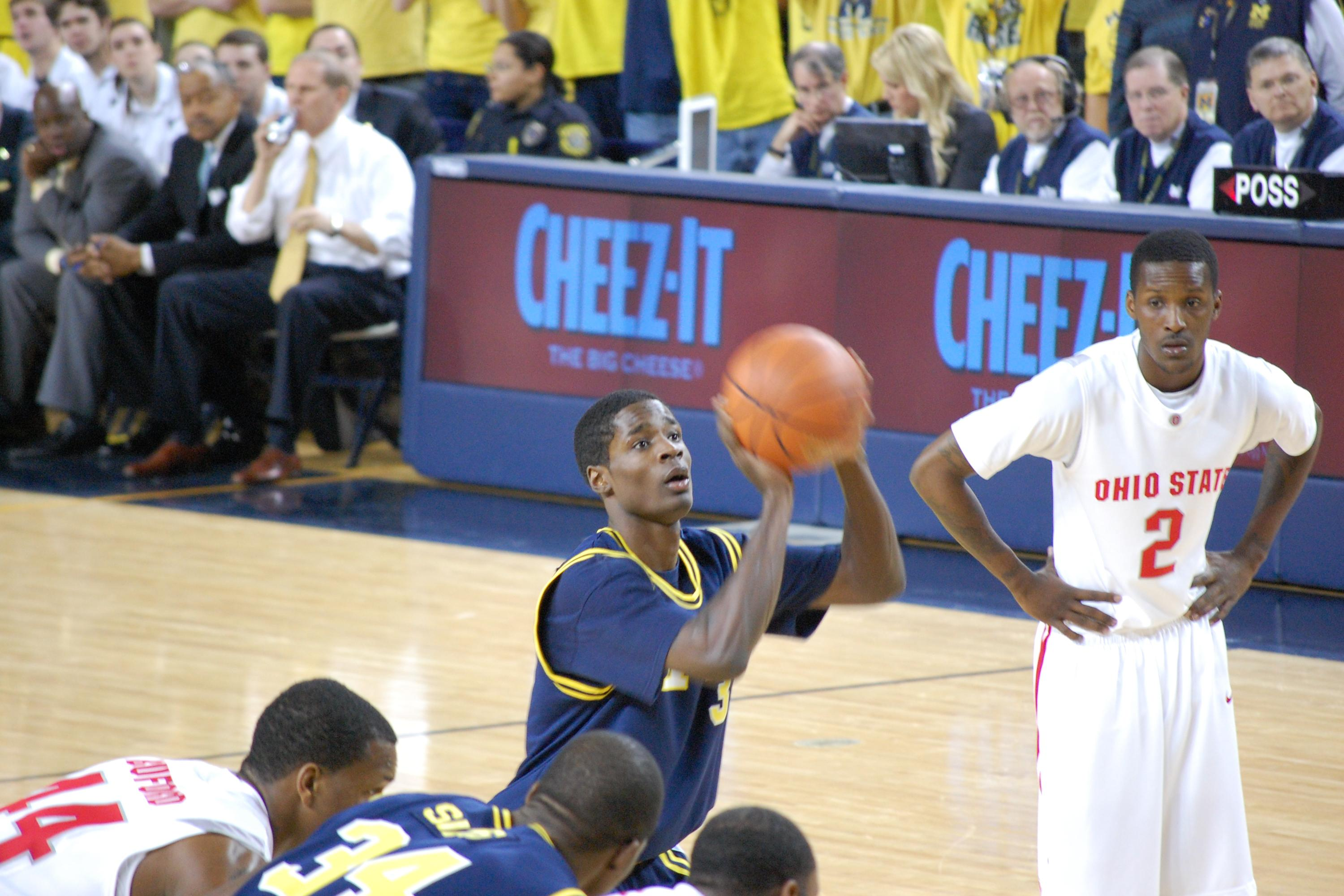
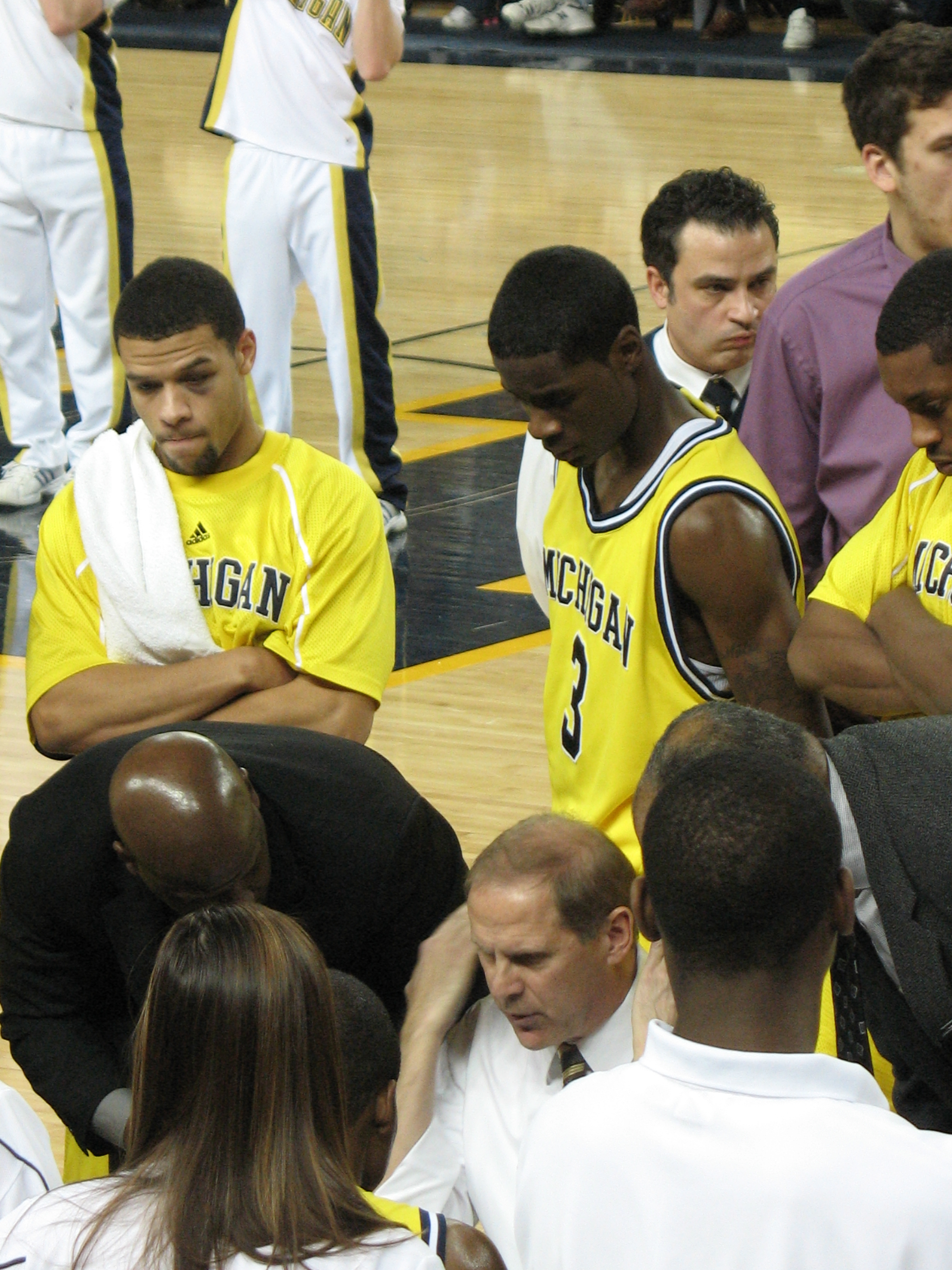
Top: Harris shoots a free throw vs. Ohio State on January 17, 2009; Bottom: Harris looks over head coach John Beilein's shoulder in the huddle on January 4, 2009

As a 2008–09 first team pre-season All-Big Ten player, he was the first Wolverine to earn the honor since Daniel Horton in 2004. Although he was the leading returning scorer and top draft prospect, Purdue's Robbie Hummel was named Big Ten Preseason Player of the Year. Preseason All-Big Ten status has not always led to regular season honors. In both 2005 and 2007, only two preseason selections made the regular season team. Harris opened the 2008–09 Michigan Wolverines men's basketball season with a career-high 30 points in a 77–55 victory over Michigan Tech on November 11. The following night in the second game of the Coaches vs. cancer classic, Harris nearly posted a triple double when he posted 26 points, and career-highs with 10 rebounds and 8 assists in a 76–56 win against Northeastern University. This quick start earned Harris the November 17, 2008 Big Ten Player of the Week Award. Harris led the Big Ten Conference in scoring until the second to last game of the preconference schedule when he snapped a ten-game double digit scoring streak. Throughout the season, he continued to battle with fellow sophomores Evan Turner and Talor Battle for the Big Ten scoring leadership. On February 5, Harris was selected along with Kalin Lucas as one of only two Big Ten John R. Wooden Award 2008–09 Midseason Top 30 Candidates. On March 5, the National Association of Basketball Coaches honored Harris as a District 7 (Big Ten) first-team selection along with four other sophomores (Lucas, Turner, Battle, and JaJuan Johnson). On March 9 after the conclusion of the 2008–09 Big Ten Conference men's basketball season, he was named to the first team All-Big Ten by both the Big Ten coaches and the Big Ten media along with the same four sophomores. He was also chosen on March 10 by the U.S. Basketball Writers Association for its 2008–09 Men's Division I District V (OH, IN, IL, MI, MN, WI) Team, based on voting from its national membership. On March 26 Harris was honored as one of four Michigan men's basketball Winter Sports Big Ten Academic All-Conference selections.

Harris, at 86.3% (176/204), was NCAA free throw shooting percentage champion. Harris led the Wolverines in points, minutes, assists and steals. Additionally, Harris finished one behind teammate DeShawn Sims for the team leadership rebounds. In the Big Ten, Harris ranked first (or second depending on the source) in free throw percentage, first in free throws made, second in points per game, fifth in assists per game, and sixth in rebounds per game. Harris and Evan Turner (who led the Big Ten in scoring) were the only Big Ten players to finish in the conference's top 10 in total points, rebounds, assists, and steals. They are the 4th and 5th players in conference history to finish in the top ten in average points, rebounds, and assists since assists became a statistic in 1983–84. Of these five, Harris was the only one to finish in the top six in each stat prior to Turner's 2009–10 season.

=== Junior year ===
2009–10 Michigan Wolverines men's basketball Big Ten Season

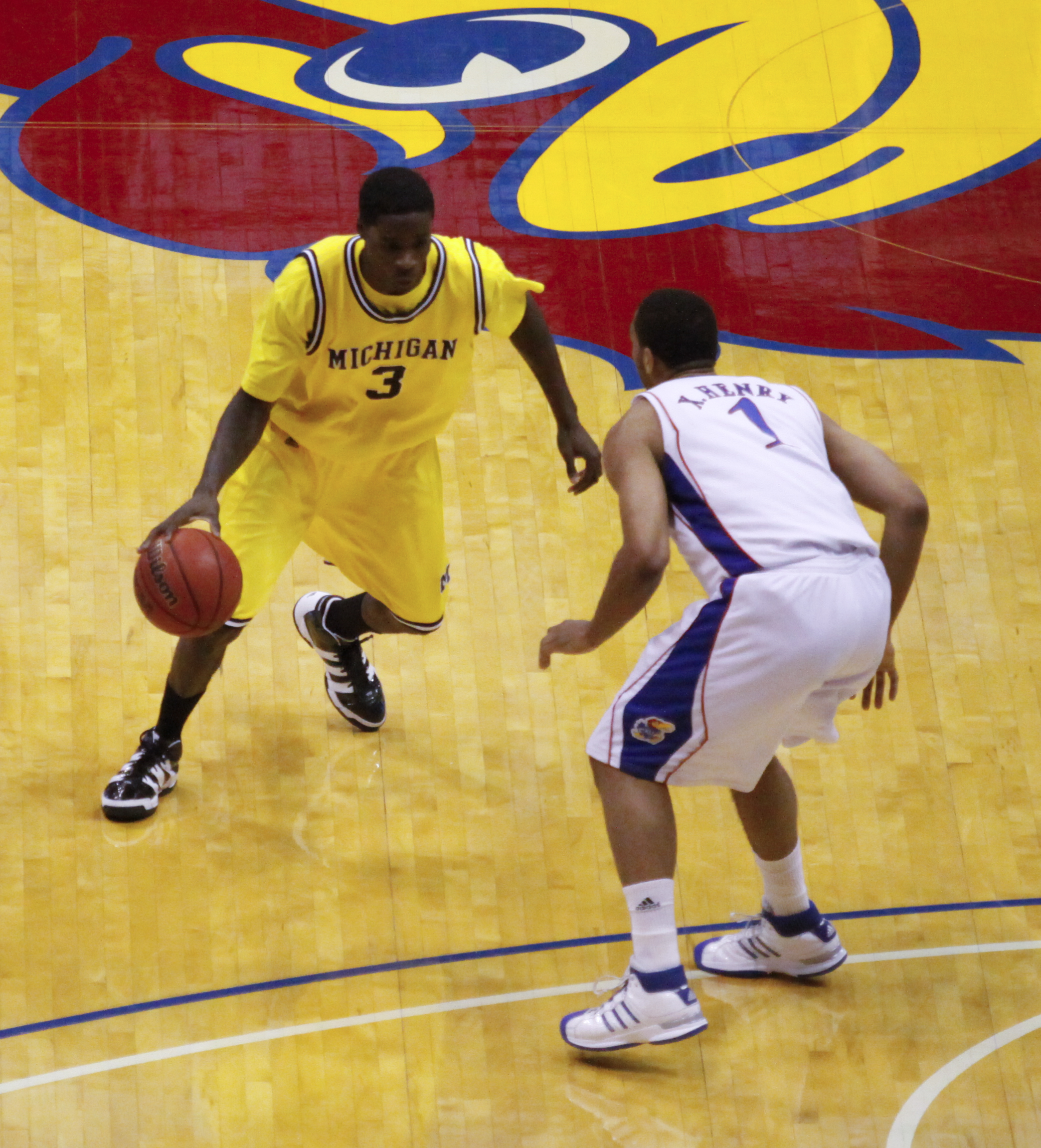
Harris guarded by future Lakers and D-Fenders teammate Xavier Henry of the #1-ranked Kansas on December 19, 2009.

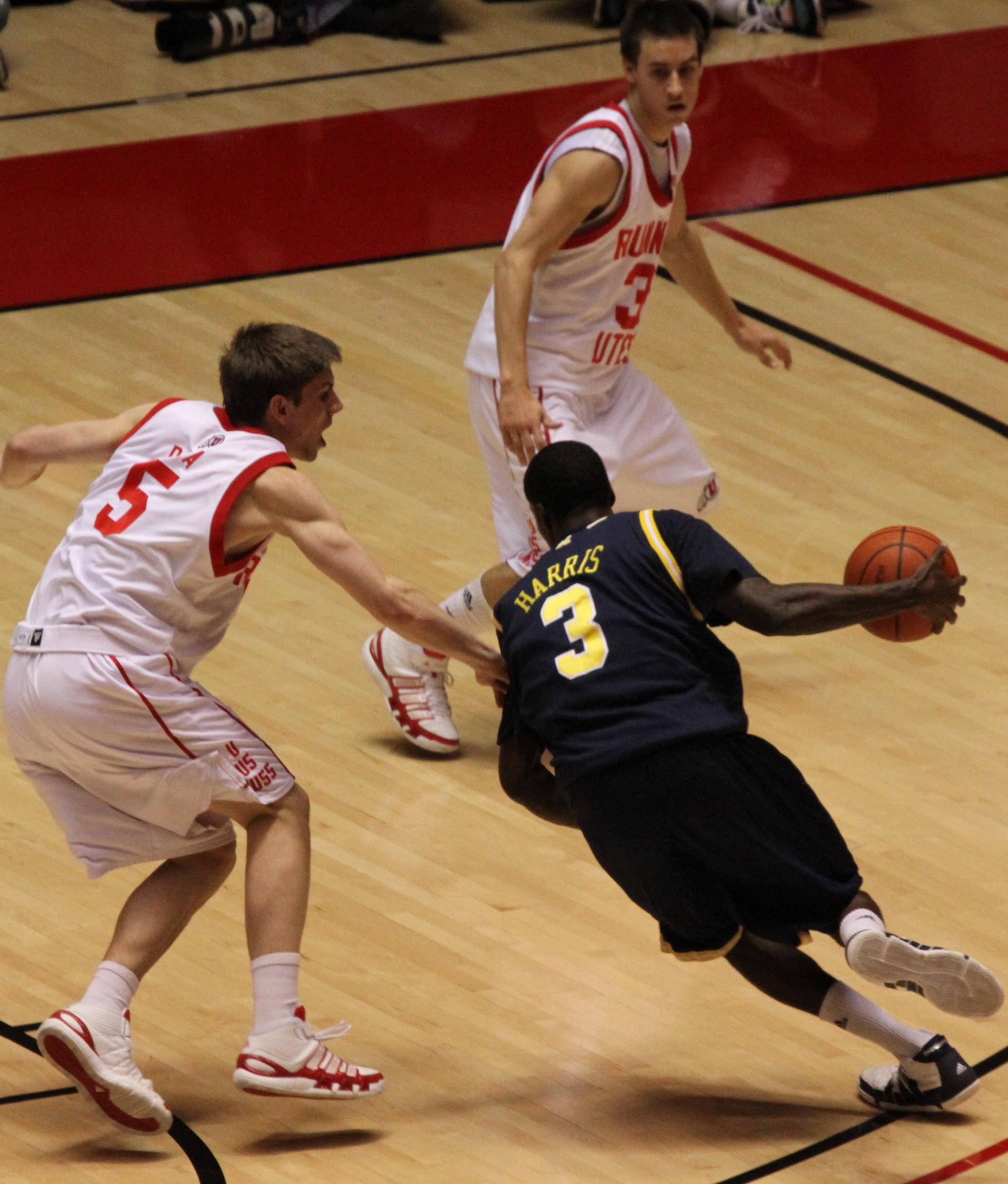
Harris drives against Utah on December 9, 2009.

Entering the 2009–10 NCAA Division I men's basketball season for the 2009–10 Wolverines, Harris was named to the FOX Sports preseason All-American list included him on its second team. Harris and Sims were named among the 50 preseason Wooden Award watch list nominees. Harris was also named to the preseason Naismith College Player of the Year watchlist. The 24-member Big Ten media panel selected Harris as a first team preseason All-Big Ten team member.

Harris opened the season by recording the second triple double in school history (Gary Grant was the first) against Division II Northern Michigan. This earned him his third Big Ten player of the week honor. Harris was suspended prior to the January 23 game against #13 Purdue due to unsportsmanlike conduct in one of the team's practices. Harris was named as a finalist for the 2010 Bob Cousy Award and a Midseason Top-30 finalist for the 2010 John Wooden Award. At the conclusion of the regular season, he was named a third-team All-Big Ten selection by both the conference coaches and the media. He was recognized as an All-District second-team selection by the National Association of Basketball Coaches making him eligible for the State Farm Division I All‐America teams. Since the Big Ten Conference was its own district, this is equivalent to being named second team All-Big Ten by the NABC. Harris concluded his junior season with 484 free throws made. Cazzie Russell holds the official Michigan career record with 486 with Louis Bullock's 505 total having been vacated due to the University of Michigan basketball scandal. He joined Jalen Rose and Mike McGee as the only Wolverines to amass 1600 points over a three-year period. Harris finished the season among the Big Ten Conference leaders in several statistical categories including: fourth in scoring, tenth in rebounds, fifth in assists, seventh in free throw percentage, second in steals (1.83 to 1.81), and eighth in minutes played.

=== 2010 NBA draft ===
On March 29, Harris held a press conference in which he announced his intentions to enter the NBA draft. Multiple draft outlets ranked Harris as likely to be drafted in the 2nd round or go undrafted. Two days after the announcement, Harris was recognized as an Academic All-Conference performer again. Harris suffered a hamstring injury shortly before the draft, which hampered his draft workouts and draft potential. Harris was undrafted in the 2010 NBA draft.

=== College statistics ===
Year	Team	GP	GS	MPG	FG%	3P%	FT%	RPG	APG	SPG	BPG	PPG
2007–08	Michigan Wolverines	32	32	33.1	.381	.318	.817	4.2	2.7	1.4	.2	16.1
2008–09	Michigan Wolverines	35	35	32.9	.414	.327	.863	6.7	4.4	1.2	.5	16.8
2009–10	Michigan Wolverines	31	30	36.1	.421	.308	.800	6.0	4.1	1.8	.4	18.1
Career		98	97	34.0	.406	.318	.827	5.7	3.7	1.5	.4	17.0

== Professional career ==
=== Cleveland Cavaliers (2010–2011) ===
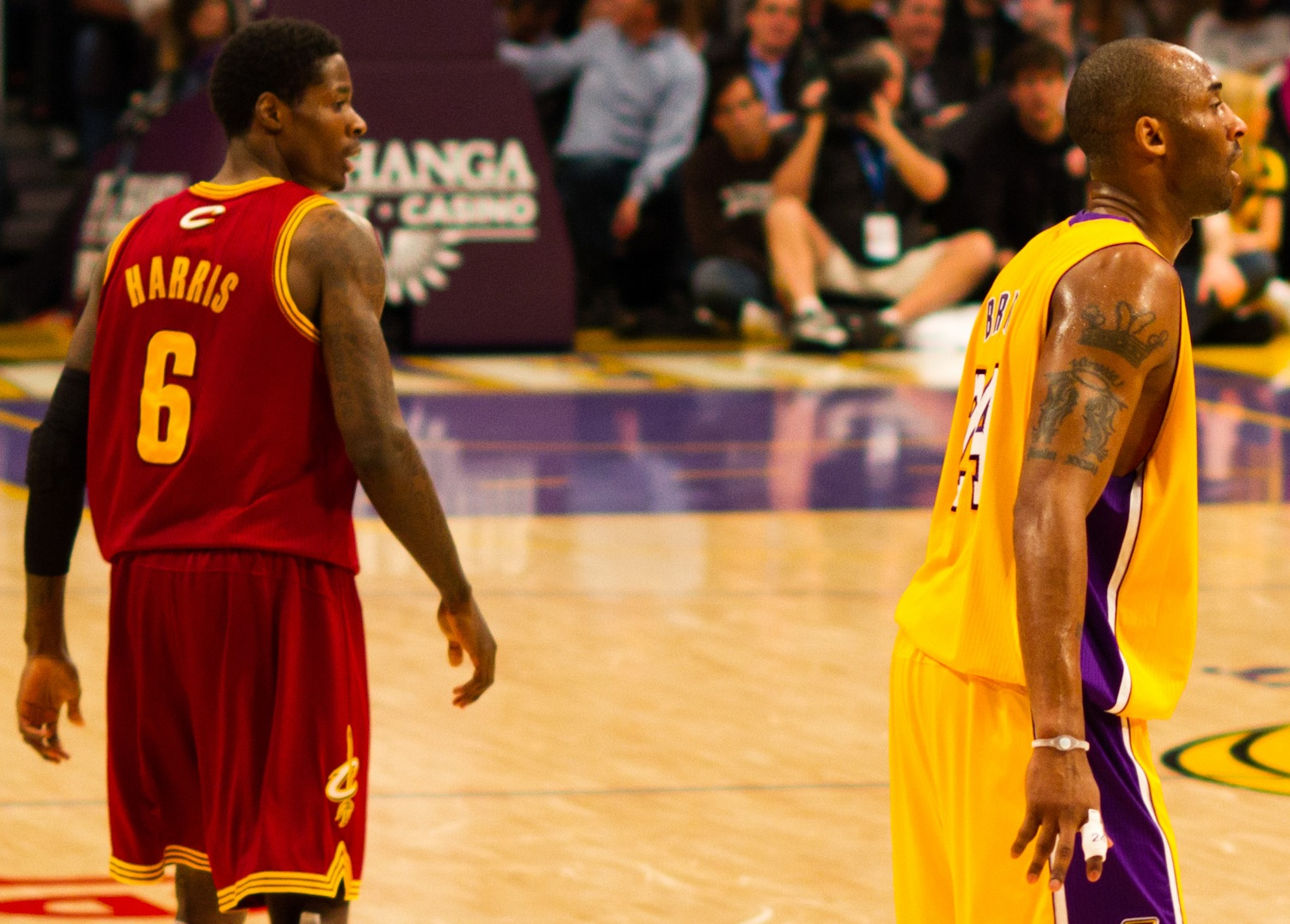
Harris walks by Kobe Bryant on January 11, 2011.

Harris played for the Cleveland Cavaliers in the NBA Summer League in 2010. He saw limited action due to the same ankle injury that impaired his draft status. After being an undrafted player from Michigan for about 3 1/2 months, Harris joined the Cleveland Cavaliers with a #6 jersey number as a non-guaranteed free agent member of the 20-man preseason roster. Harris made the final roster. He made his debut on October 29 against the Toronto Raptors in which he scored 8 points. Harris' agent is Henry Thomas. After compiling a 7–14 record in the first 21 games, head coach Byron Scott shuffled the lineup on December 8, and Harris played twenty-one minutes that night.

On December 29, Harris made his first start when Mo Williams was recovering from an injury and scored 8 points. In his fourth start on January 7 against the Golden State, Harris posted his first double-double with career highs of 16 points and 10 rebounds and added 3 steals and 4 assists, too. Then, on January 9, he posted a new career-high 27 points against the Phoenix Suns. With the return of Daniel Gibson and Anthony Parker to the lineup he saw little action until February 23.

Harris was waived by the Cavaliers on December 22, 2011. The transaction came as the 2011–12 Cavaliers made their final cuts from 17 to 15 players. The move was attributed to a freezer burn that Harris suffered on his foot during the 2011 NBA lockout in a cooling chamber designed to augment recuperation from injuries at the Nike facility in Oregon.

=== Canton Charge (2011–2012) ===
On December 28, 2011, Harris signed with the Canton Charge of the NBA Development League (D-League). The Charge are the D-League affiliate of the Cavaliers, but the Cavaliers had no exclusive rights to Harris. He was signed under the NBA Development League's player affiliate rule allowing ". . .D-League teams to acquire up to three players that were waived from their affiliate's NBA training camp that do not otherwise have their rights held by another team." After about a week of rehab with the Charge, he was getting close to returning to the court with the Charge. Technically, he was waived by the team, but the Charge retained their rights to him during his rehab. On January 9, he was readded to the roster by the Charge, and he scored 15 points for the team on the 10th in his debut.

On January 24, he contributed a game-high 32-point effort against the Springfield Armor, surpassing both his professional career-high of 27 set on January 9, 2011, with Cleveland and his post-secondary career-high 30 set on November 11, 2008, with Michigan. He earned the NBA Development League Performer of the Week for games played from January 23–29 for his three-game performance in which he averaged 25.0 points, 7.3 rebounds, 4.3 assists and 2.0 steals in 34.3 minutes per contest. On February 3, Harris logged his professional career-high 14 rebounds along with 21 points on his way to his second D-League double-double against the Austin Toros. On February 16, Harris posted a new career high 46 points along with 9 rebounds, 6 assists and 4 steals against the Rio Grande Valley Vipers. This is a Charge record for the franchise since its move to Canton. In the rematch two nights later, he added 36 points, 9 rebounds, 6 assists and 3 steals. He became the first player to earn two player of the week awards in the 2011–12 season when the league recognized him for his performance for the week of February 13–19. In 17 games for Canton, he had averages of 21.4 points, 7.9 rebounds, 3.3 assists and 1.6 blocks per game, while shooting 47% from the field and 40.9% on three-point shots.

=== Return to Cleveland (2012) ===
On February 21, the Cleveland Cavaliers announced they had signed Harris to a 10-day contract. He was re-signed on March 2 to a second 10-day contract. After the second 10-day contract expired on March 11 and with the trade deadline approaching on March 15, the Cavaliers opted not to sign Harris to a guaranteed contract for the rest of the season.

On March 17, 2012, the Cavaliers re-signed Harris for the remainder of the season. On March 21, Harris moved into the main rotation and began playing about 20 minutes or more per game. On April 6 with Parker, Kyrie Irving and Gibson all injured, Harris made his first start of the season and 16th of his career against the Toronto Raptors. On April 20, Harris posted his first NBA double-double of the season with 19 points and a game-high and career-high 12 rebounds against the New York Knicks. In two seasons with the Cavaleiers, Harris averaged 6.2 points, 2.6 rebounds and 1.5 assists in 17.4 minutes in 80 games (including 20 starts).

On July 2, 2012, the Cavaliers waived Harris. Harris then joined the Houston Rockets for the 2012 NBA Summer League.

=== BC Azovmash (2012–2013) ===
On September 13, 2012, Harris signed with BC Azovmash in Ukraine.

=== Los Angeles D-Fenders (2013–2014) ===
On September 27, 2013, Harris signed with the Orlando Magic for training camp. A long shot to make the 15-man roster, Harris was waived on October 25. On December 7, Harris' rights were acquired by Los Angeles D-Fenders in a trade with the Canton Charge. In his D-Fenders debut on December 14, 2013, against the Santa Cruz Warriors, he scored 41 points. He also had a professional career-high 5 steals, 4 rebounds and 3 assists. On December 16, he was one of the top D-League players of the week. On December 23, he was again one of the top D-league players of the week, based on a pair of 20+ point performances. He was also a finalist for D-League Player of the Month. Harris averaged 29.3 points per game for the week ending January 5, leading his team in scoring and to victory in each of the three games. As a result, he earned his first D-League player of the week award of the season and third of his career. On January 10, Harris posted 49 points along with 6 rebounds, 3 steals, 3 assists and a block against the Idaho Stampede. The 49 points was a Los Angeles D-Fenders franchise record. and tied the 2013–14 NBADL season high set earlier by Pierre Jackson. On January 13, Harris earned his second consecutive NBA Development League Performer of the Week award. On January 13, Harris scored 42 against the Maine Red Claws to improve his season scoring average to 30.6, taking the league lead from Jackson. In 13 games with the D-Fenders, Harris averaged a league-leading 30.6 points, league-leading 8.9 free throws made and a league-leading 10.2 free throws attempted. He also averaged 6.5 rebounds, 3.7 assists and 2.1 steals (6th in the league), while shooting 48.5%.

=== Los Angeles Lakers (2014) ===
On January 16, 2014, Harris signed a 10-day contract with the Los Angeles Lakers. On January 26, he signed a second 10-day contract after averaging 6.4 points, 3.6 rebounds and 1.6 assists in 20.9 minutes in 5 games. The Lakers were enduring injuries of guards Kobe Bryant, Steve Nash, Steve Blake, Jordan Farmar, and Xavier Henry. After re-signing, Harris posted a season high 18 points that night against the New York Knicks.

On February 3, 2014, Harris was named to the Futures All-Star roster for the 2014 NBA D-League All-Star Game. At the time of the announcement, Harris was one of at five players on an NBA roster that were selected, but who had played over half of their D-League team's games through January 26. On February 4, the eve of the end of Harris' second 10-day contract, the Lakers appeared to be returning to good health, with the return of Nash, Blake and Farmar to the lineup imminent. That night, although Nash and Blake returned to the starting lineup against Minnesota, Jodie Meeks and Jordan Hill were injured in the first quarter and Harris contributed 19 points and 8 rebounds even though he had been told before the game he would not be re-signed.

=== Return to D-Fenders (2014) ===
On February 7, 2014, Harris was re-acquired by the D-Fenders. On February 8, 2014, Harris again set a new D-Fenders franchise scoring record, this time with 56 points, while adding 15 rebounds against the Santa Cruz Warriors. It was two points shy of the league record set by Jackson four days earlier. He was a nominee for D-League Player of the Week, but Jackson won. Harris played 12 minutes in the February 15 D-League All-Star game. Afterwards, he missed some games due to an ankle injury. He was a finalist for player of the week on March 3 and 10.

=== Türk Telekom (2014) ===
After playing a total of 22 games in the NBA D-League for the D-Fenders and averaging 31.6 points, 7.9 rebounds and 3.7 assists, Harris signed with Türk Telekom B.K. of the Turkish Basketball League on March 13.

=== Third stint with D-Fenders (2014) ===
On November 1, 2014, Harris was reacquired by the Los Angeles D-Fenders. On December 6, Harris posted a triple-double with 23 points, 12 assists and 10 rebounds to help the D-fenders defeat the Reno Bighorns. On December 20, Harris recorded his second triple-double of the season with 39 points, 13 assists and 10 rebounds in an historic win. The D-Fenders set new NBA Development League records of most points scored in a single quarter, half and game en route to a 175–152 win over Reno. On December 22, Harris earned his first D-League Performer of the Week of the season and fifth of his career.

=== Eskişehir Basket (2014–2015) ===
On December 30, Harris left Los Angeles in order to sign with Eskişehir Basket of the Turkish Basketball League the following day.

=== Fourth run with D-Fenders (2015) ===
On October 31, 2015, Harris returned to the Los Angeles D-Fenders for a fourth stint. He began the season as a finalist for performer of the week during the first week and a half of the season.

=== Texas Legends (2015–2016) ===
On December 14, Harris was traded to the Texas Legends in exchange for the returning player rights to Damion James.

=== Return to Türk Telekom (2016) ===
On January 26, 2016, Harris left Texas and signed with Türk Telekom for a second stint.

=== Anhui Dragons (2016) ===
In May 2016, Harris signed in China with the Anhui Dragons for the 2016 NBL season.

=== Return to Texas (2016–2017) ===
On October 30, 2016, Harris was reacquired by the Texas Legends. On November 12, Harris established a Texas Legends franchise record by scoring 49 points in the season opener against the Maine Red Claws. The total was a record for a Red Claw opponent. On December 27, the Dallas Mavericks signed Pierre Jackson to a two-year NBA contract from the Legends. On December 28, Harris posted 47 in a win for the Legends. On January 2, 2017, Harris again earned NBA Development League Performer of the Week based on his 38.0 points average on 57.4 percent shooting as well as 5.0 rebounds, 4.0 assists and 2.0 steals per game in two games on December 28 against the Austin Spurs and December 30 against the Reno Bighorns. At the time he was leading the D-League in scoring and was second in steals. Despite leading the league in scoring, Harris was not selected to the 2017 D-League All-Star team.

=== Dallas Mavericks (2017) ===
On March 8, 2017, the Dallas Mavericks signed Harris to a 10-day contract. Harris had been the NBA D-League leading scorer at the time of the signing with averages of 26.3 points, 7.6 rebounds, 4.0 assists, and 2.2 steals. He made his debut for the Mavericks later that day during a 105–96 win over the Brooklyn Nets, playing two minutes off the bench. On March 18, the Mavericks announced that they would re-sign Harris to a second 10-day contract. During the 2016–17 season, Harris was assigned multiple times to the Texas Legends. Harris was not resigned by the Mavericks after his second 10-day contract expired.

=== Return to Anhui (2017) ===
On July 29, 2017, Harris re-joined the Anhui Dragons of the National Basketball League. Harris was recognized as Asia-Basket.com All-Chinese NBL Player of the Year and Asia-Basket.com All-Chinese NBL Import Player of the Year in 2016 as he helped Anhui Dragons win the Chinese NBL championship title in 2016 with averages of 31.5ppg, 7.2rpg, 3.7apg and 2.7spg.

=== AEK B.C. (2017–2018) ===
On August 12, 2017, Harris signed a one-year contract with Greek club AEK. Harris was selected the MVP of the 14th round of the FIBA Champions League 2017–18 season. Harris posted 21 points in the February 11, 2018, HEBA Greek All Star Game. He was also named the MVP of the 2017–18 Greek Cup tournament, after leading AEK Athens to victory. He also earned 2017– FIBA Champions League regular season MVP, as AEK earned the 2018 FIBA Basketball Champions League championship.

=== Rytas Vilnius (2018) ===
On September 3, 2018, Harris signed with Greek club Olympiacos, for their preseason practices, while their rosters were depleted due to the 2019 FIBA Basketball World Cup qualification events. On October 9, Harris signed with Rytas Vilnius.

=== Bahçeşehir Koleji S.K. (2018–2019) ===
On December 14, Harris signed with Bahçeşehir Koleji S.K.

=== NLEX Road Warriors (2019) ===
On October 17, 2019, Harris joined the NLEX Road Warriors of the Philippine Basketball Association for the PBA Governor's Cup. In his PBA Debut, Harris had an impressive statline of 45 points, 5 rebounds and 4 assists in a win 117–111 win over Columbian Dyip.

=== Hapoel Holon (2020) ===
On December 10, 2019, Harris signed with the Shandong Golden Stars of the Chinese Basketball Association. He parted ways with the Golden Stars after the CBA season was postponed due to the coronavirus outbreak. On February 9, 2020, Harris signed with Hapoel Holon of the Israeli Premier League for the rest of the season.

On February 15, 2020, he made his debut in a 90–86 win over Hapoel Tel Aviv, recording 22 points and four rebounds off the bench. He played three games for the team., averaging 22 points, 6.7 rebounds, and 3.3 assists per game.

=== Shandong Heroes (2020–2021) ===
On October 4, 2020, Harris signed with the Shandong Heroes of the CBA. On November 5, he was named CBA player of the week after posting 44 points and ten rebounds, while his team defeated the Nanjing Monkey Kings.

=== Return to AEK (2021) ===
On July 29, 2021, Harris signed back with AEK Athens of the Greek Basket League and the Basketball Champions League. He left the team on October 3.

=== Kaohsiung Steelers ===
On March 2, 2022, Harris signed with Kaohsiung Steelers of the Taiwanese P. League+ for the remainder of the season.

=== Return to Hapoel Holon (2023) ===
On February 25, 2023, he signed with Hapoel Holon of the Israeli Basketball Premier League.

=== Merkezefendi Bld. Denizli Basket (2023) ===
On April 28, 2023, he signed with Merkezefendi Bld. Denizli Basket of the Turkish Basketball Super League (BSL).

=== Al Ittihad Alexandria (2023–present) ===
In October 2023, Harris made his debut for Al Ittihad Alexandria.

== Career statistics ==
Legend
GP	Games played	GS	Games started	MPG	Minutes per game
FG%	Field goal percentage	3P%	3-point field goal percentage	FT%	Free throw percentage
RPG	Rebounds per game	APG	Assists per game	SPG	Steals per game
BPG	Blocks per game	PPG	Points per game	**Bold**	Career high

=== NBA ===
==== Regular season ====
Year	Team	GP	GS	MPG	FG%	3P%	FT%	RPG	APG	SPG	BPG	PPG
2010–11	Cleveland	**54**	**15**	17.3	.374	**.370**	.763	2.6	**1.6**	**.6**	.1	5.9
2011–12	Cleveland	26	5	17.5	**.400**	.333	.695	2.7	1.2	.5	**.2**	6.7
2013–14	L.A. Lakers	9	0	**20.0**	**.400**	.350	**.833**	**3.8**	1.2	.4	.1	**8.1**
2016–17	Dallas	4	0	6.3	.200	.000	.500	2.3	.5	.0	.0	2.0
Career		93	20	17.1	.380	.353	.738	2.7	1.4	.5	.2	6.2

=== NBA D-League ===
==== Regular season ====
Year	Team	GP	GS	MPG	FG%	3P%	FT%	RPG	APG	SPG	BPG	PPG
2011–12	Canton	17	12	32.9	.470	**.409**	.857	**7.9**	3.3	1.7	**.4**	21.4
2013–14	Los Angeles	**22**	**22**	**38.7**	**.472**	.302	**.883**	**7.9**	**3.8**	**2.1**	.2	**31.6**
Career		39	34	36.2	.471	.329	.874	7.9	3.6	1.9	.3	27.2
All-Star		1	1	12.0	.500	.000	.000	3.0	4.0	1.0	.0	6.0

=== International domestic leagues ===
==== Regular season ====
Season	Team	League	GP	GS	MPG	FG%	3P%	FT%	RPG	APG	SPG	BPG	PPG
2012–13	Azovmash	UBL	**39**	**29**	28.0	.407	.260	.777	**6.3**	**1.6**	1.3	.3	14.1
2013–14	Türk Telekom	BSL	2	2	**28.5**	**.469**	**.375**	**.867**	2.5	1.5	**2.0**	**.5**	**23.0**
2017–18	AEK	GBL	22	21	26.3	.391	.214	.814	5.5	2.2	.8	.3	12.5
Career			41	31	28.0	.411	.266	.783	6.1	1.6	1.4	.3	14.5

=== FIBA Champions League ===
†	Denotes seasons in which Manny Harris won the FIBA Champions League

Year	Team	GP	MPG	FG%	3P%	FT%	RPG	APG	SPG	BPG	PPG
2017–18†	AEK	18	31.3	.463	.312	.800	5.1	2.4	1.9	.2	17.1

== Personal life ==
His name, Corperryale, is a combination of the names of his cousin (Corrine), an uncle (Perry) and the "ale" of his immediate siblings—Janelle, Jerrelle and Al. He has a total of nine brothers and sisters and is the son of Merrick (Harris-Carter) and James Carter. Harris' middle name, Lādorable, is derived from his mother's reaction that he was "adorable" when she first saw him. The source of his nickname, "Manny", is given differing accounts by his parents: his mother claims that it was because he "looked like a grown man" as a baby while his father claims it was after the character Manny Ribera in Scarface. During the 2013–14 season, the @DFenders and @nbadleague Twitter accounts occasionally referred to Harris using the hashtag #MichiganMamba. Upon being called up to the NBA, @LakerNation used the nickname once.

== See also ==
- Michigan Wolverines men's basketball statistical leaders
