= 2025–26 Basketball Champions League =

European basketball competition

Basketball Champions League
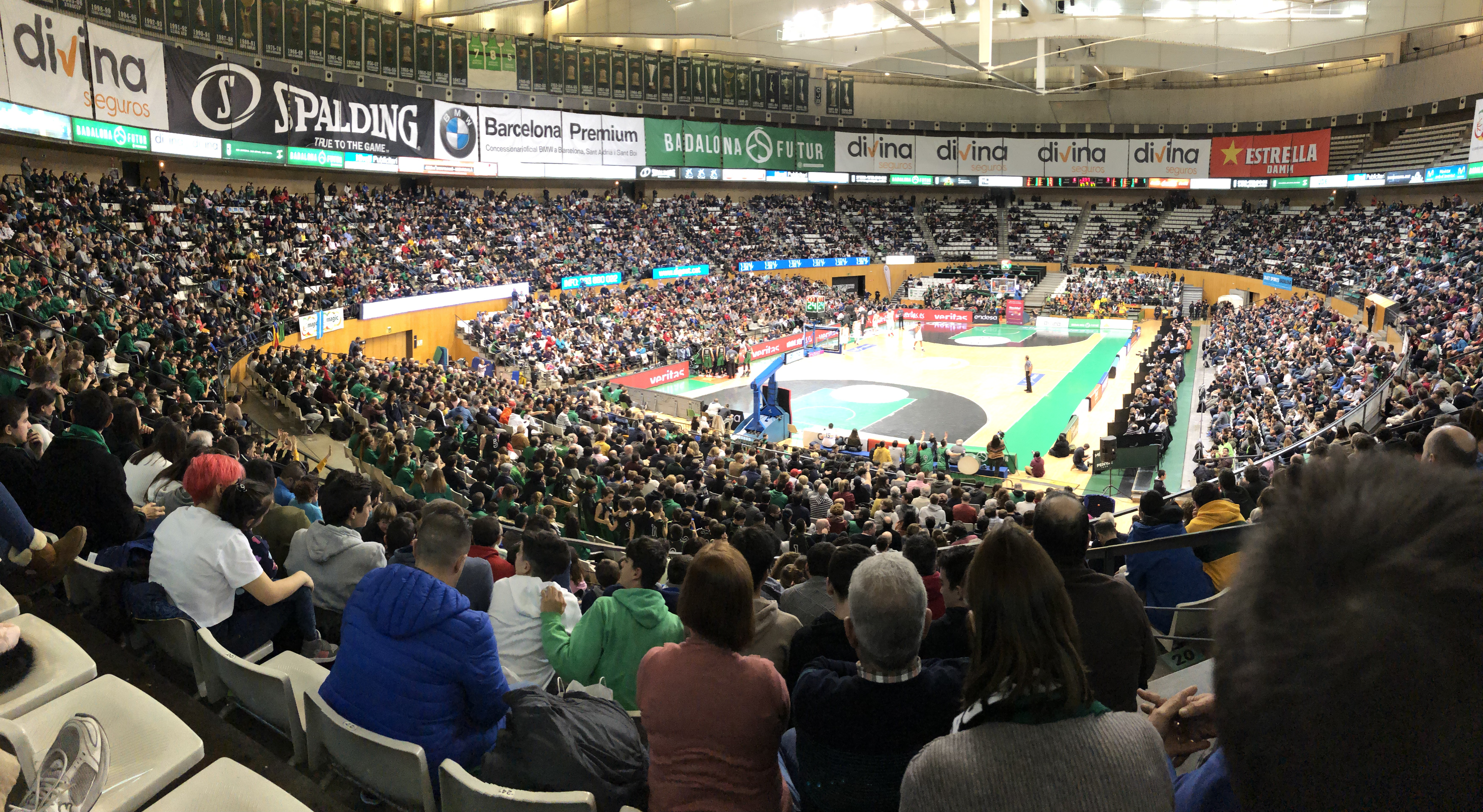
- Pavelló Olímpic in Badalona hosted the Final Four
- Season: 2025–26
- Dates: Qualifying: 23–28 September 2025; Competition proper: 7 October 2025 – 9 May 2026
- Teams: Competition proper: 32; Total: 53 (from 30 countries)

Regular season
- Season MVP: (United States) Frank Bartley (AEK Betsson)

Finals
- Champions: (Lithuania) Rytas (1st title)
- Runners-up: (Greece) AEK Betsson
- Third place: (Spain) Unicaja
- Fourth place: (Spain) La Laguna Tenerife
- Final Four MVP: (Germany) Simonas Lukošius (Rytas)

Awards
- Best Coach: (Serbia) Dragan Šakota
- Best Young Player: (Germany) Jack Kayil
- Best Defender: (Montenegro) Kendrick Perry

Statistical leaders
Points	(United States) Jerrick Harding (Rytas)	19.4
Rebounds	(United States) Brady Skeens (Szolnoki Olajbányász)	11.3
Assists	(Canada) Marcus Carr (Würzburg Baskets)	6.7

The 2025–26 Basketball Champions League was the 10th season of the Basketball Champions League (BCL), a European professional basketball competition for clubs launched by FIBA.

Unicaja were the defending champions, but were eliminated by AEK in the semi-finals. BC Rytas won its first Champions League title following their win over AEK, winning their first European title since 2009.

== Team allocation ==
A total of 53 teams from 30 of the 50 FIBA Europe member associations are set to participate in the 2025–26 Basketball Champions League. The country ranking based on the country coefficients is used to determine the number of participating teams for each country:

- All countries, if they entered, each have at least one team qualify.
- The winners of the 2024–25 Basketball Champions League are given an additional entry if they do not qualify for the 2025–26 Basketball Champions League through their domestic league.
- The organizer may grant access to the League through the attribution of up to 4 invitations (wild cards) to the Regular Season or to the Qualification Rounds.
- If one or more clubs do not use their right to participate in the Basketball Champions League, the organiser may decide to allocate the respective place(s) to other clubs of the same or other country.

=== Country ranking ===
It takes into account their performance from 2022–23 to 2024–25.

Country ranking for 2025–26 Basketball Champions League

Rank	Country	Coeff.	Teams
1	Spain	97.70	4+1
2	Turkey	65.95	3+1
3	France	65.58	2+1
4	Israel	65.33	2+0
5	Greece	65.00	3+1
6	Germany	54.75	3+1
7	Czech Republic	49.50	1+0
8	Italy	43.92	2+1
9	Lithuania	38.00	1+1
10	Hungary	36.00	1+1
11	Portugal	34.00	1+1
12	Belgium	33.50	1+1
13	Bosnia and Herzegovina	31.00	1+0
14	Latvia	27.00	1+0
15	Poland	21.00	1+1
16	Serbia	9.50	1+0
17	Denmark	9.00	0+1

Rank	Country	Coeff.	Teams
18	Slovakia	7.00	0+1
19	Switzerland	7.00	0+1
20	Estonia	6.00	0+1
21	Netherlands	5.00	0+1
22	Romania	5.00	0+1
23	Sweden	5.00	0+0
24	Cyprus	4.00	0+1
25	Finland	4.00	0+1
26	Kosovo	4.00	0+1
27	Great Britain	3.00	0+0
28	Austria	2.00	0+0
29	Ukraine	2.00	0+0
30	Georgia	2.00	0+1
31	Bulgaria	2.00	0+1
32	North Macedonia	1.00	0+1
33	Montenegro	1.00	0+1
34	Azerbaijan	1.00	1+0

=== Teams ===
The labels in the parentheses show how each team qualified for the place of its starting round:

- TH: Title holders
- 1st, 2nd, 3rd, 4th, etc.: League positions of the previous season

Qualified teams for 2025–26 Basketball Champions League (by entry round)
Regular season
(Spanish Basketball Federation) La Laguna Tenerife (3rd)	(Hellenic Basketball Federation) Promitheas Vikos Cola (4th)	(Israeli Basketball Association) Bnei Penlink Herzliya (5th)	(Latvian Basketball Association) VEF Rīga (1st)
(Spanish Basketball Federation) Unicaja (4th)^{TH}	(Hellenic Basketball Federation) Karditsa Iaponiki (5th)	(Italian Basketball Federation) Trapani Shark (3rd)	(Lithuanian Basketball Federation) Rytas (2nd)
(Spanish Basketball Federation) Joventut Badalona (6th)	(Turkish Basketball Federation) Tofaş (5th)	(Italian Basketball Federation) Pallacanestro Trieste (6th)	(Polish Basketball Federation) Legia Warszawa (1st)
(Spanish Basketball Federation) Dreamland Gran Canaria (7th)	(Turkish Basketball Federation) Mersin (6th)	(Azerbaijan Basketball Federation) Sabah (1st)	(Portuguese Basketball Federation) Benfica (1st)
(German Basketball Federation) MLP Academics Heidelberg (3rd)	(Turkish Basketball Federation) Galatasaray (7th)	(Basketball Belgium) Filou Oostende (1st)	(Basketball Federation of Serbia) Spartak Office Shoes (2nd)
(German Basketball Federation) Fitness First Würzburg Baskets (4th)	(French Federation of Basketball) Cholet (5th)	(Basketball Federation of Bosnia and Herzegovina) Igokea m:tel (1st)	
(German Basketball Federation) Alba Berlin (7th)	(French Federation of Basketball) Le Mans (6th)	(Czech Basketball Federation) ERA Nymburk (1st)	
(Hellenic Basketball Federation) AEK (3rd)	(Israeli Basketball Association) Hapoel Netanel Holon (4th)	(Hungarian Basketball Federation) NHSZ-Szolnoki Olajbányász (1st)	
Qualifying rounds
(Basketball Belgium) Windrose Giants Antwerp (6th)	(French Federation of Basketball) Élan Chalon (7th)	(Basketball Federation of Kosovo) Trepça (1st)	(Portuguese Basketball Federation) Porto (2nd)
(Bulgarian Basketball Federation) Rilski Sportist (1st)	(Georgian Basketball Federation) Kutaisi 2010 (1st)	(Lithuanian Basketball Federation) Juventus (6th)	(Romanian Basketball Federation) CSM CSU Oradea (2nd)
(Cyprus Basketball Federation) Petrolina AEK Larnaca (1st)	(German Basketball Federation) Löwen Braunschweig (5th)	(Basketball Federation of Montenegro) SC Derby (2nd)	(Slovak Basketball Association) Patrioti Levice (1st)
(Danish Basketball Association) Bakken Bears (1st)	(Hellenic Basketball Federation) PAOK mateco (6th)	(Basketball Nederland) Heroes Den Bosch (1st)	(Spanish Basketball Federation) UCAM Murcia (9th)
(Estonian Basketball Association) Kalev/Cramo (1st)	(Hungarian Basketball Federation) Falco Szombathely (2nd)	(Basketball Federation of North Macedonia) Pelister (6th)	(Swiss Basketball) Fribourg Olympic (2nd)
(Basketball Finland) Karhu Kauhajoki (2nd)	(Italian Basketball Federation) Pallacanestro Reggiana (7th)	(Polish Basketball Federation) Start Lublin (2nd)	(Turkish Basketball Federation) Bursaspor (10th)

Notes

1. Germany (GER): Alba Berlin got a wild card.

== Referees ==
A total of 54 officials are set to work on the 2025–26 season in Basketball Champions League: After the 2024–25 season, twelve referees were replaced by new ones. Newcomers are marked by *.

Referees of the 2025−26 season
(Belgium) Geert Jacobs; (Bosnia and Herzegovina) Ademir Zurapović; (Bulgaria) Martin Horozov; (Bulgaria) Ventsislav Velikov; (Croatia) Josip Jurčević; (Croatia) Martin Vulić; (Cyprus) Ilias Kounelles; (Czech Republic) Ivor Matějek; (Estonia) Mihkel Männiste; (France) Edgard Ceccarelli *; (France) Yann Vezo Davidson *; (France) Valentin Oliot; (France) Yohan Rosso; (Germany) Carsten Straube; (Greece) Ioannis Agrafiotis *; (Greece) Georgios Poursanidis; (Greece) Ioannis Tsimpouris *; (Hungary) Péter Praksch	(Israel) Ofer Manheim; (Italy) Lorenzo Baldini; (Italy) Andrea Bongiorni *; (Italy) Valerio Grigioni *; (Italy) Silvia Marziali *; (Latvia) Andris Aunkrogers; (Latvia) Elvis Binders-Coders *; (Latvia) Ritvars Helmsteins *; (Latvia) Mārtiņš Kozlovskis; (Latvia) Gatis Saliņš; (Lithuania) Juozas Barkauskas; (Lithuania) Gvidas Gedvilas; (Lithuania) Gintaras Mačiulis; (Norway) Gizella Viola Györgyi; (Panama) Julio Anaya; (Poland) Wojciech Liszka; (Poland) Michał Proc; (Poland) Dariusz Zapolski	(Portugal) Paulo Marques; (Romania) Marius Ciulin; (Serbia) Petar Pesic; (Serbia) Siniša Prpa; (Slovakia) Zdenko Tomašovič; (Slovenia) Boris Krejić; (Slovenia) Blaž Zupančič; (Spain) Fernando Calatrava; (Spain) Luis Castillo; (Spain) Antonio Conde; (Spain) Ariadna Chueca; (Spain) Alberto Sánchez; (Turkey) Tolga Edis *; (Turkey) Cisil Güngör *; (Turkey) Orhan Cagri Hekimoglu; (Turkey) Mehmet Sahin *; (Turkey) Yener Yılmaz; (Turkey) Zafer Yılmaz

== Round and draw dates ==
The schedule of the competition will be as follows.

Schedule for 2025–26 Basketball Champions League
Phase	Round	Draw date	First leg	Second leg	Third leg
Qualifying rounds		2 July 2025	19–25 September 2025		
Regular season	Round 1	2 July 2025	7–8 October 2025		
Regular season	Round 2	2 July 2025	14–15 October 2025		
Regular season	Round 3	2 July 2025	21–22 October 2025		
Regular season	Round 3	2 July 2025	28–29 October 2025		
Regular season	Round 4	2 July 2025	4–5 November 2025		
Regular season	Round 4	2 July 2025	11–12 November 2025		
Regular season	Round 5	2 July 2025	18–19 November 2025		
Regular season	Round 5	2 July 2025	9–10 December 2025		
Regular season	Round 6	2 July 2025	16–17 December 2025		
Play-ins		2 July 2025	6 January 2026	8 January 2026	13–14 January 2026
Round of 16	Round 1	2 July 2025	20–21 January 2026		
Round of 16	Round 2	2 July 2025	27–28 January 2026		
Round of 16	Round 3	2 July 2025	3–4 February 2026		
Round of 16	Round 4	2 July 2025	10–11 February 2026		
Round of 16	Round 5	2 July 2025	10–11 March 2026		
Round of 16	Round 6	2 July 2025	17–18 March 2026		
Play-offs	Quarter-finals	20 March 2026	31 March–1 April 2026	7–8 April 2026	14–15 April 2026
Final Four	Semi-finals	20 March 2026	7 May 2026		
Final Four	Final	20 March 2026	9 May 2026		

== Qualifying rounds ==
The 24 teams will face in three qualifying round tournaments, one of which belong to the Champions Path, which contains the domestic league champions, and the other two to the League Path, which contains the rest of the teams that vie for qualify to the regular season. In each path, teams will be seeded ordered by the club ranking and by the country ranking for clubs that have not yet participated in the competition. The three winners of the finals will then qualify for the regular season and will join the 29 directly qualified teams in the main draw. The rest of the teams will qualify, if they apply, to the FIBA Europe Cup.

=== Draw ===
The draw for the qualifying rounds was held on 2 July 2025 at the Olympic Museum in Lausanne, Switzerland.

==== Champions path ====
Pot 1
Team	Pts
(Danish Basketball Association) Bakken Bears	9
(Slovak Basketball Association) Patrioti Levice	7

Pot 2
Team	Pts
(Basketball Nederland) Heroes Den Bosch	5
(Estonian Basketball Association) Kalev/Cramo	5

Pot 3
Team	Pts
(Basketball Federation of Kosovo) Trepça	2
(Bulgarian Basketball Federation) Rilski Sportist	2

Pot 4
Team	Pts
(Georgian Basketball Federation) Kutaisi 2010	1
(Cyprus Basketball Federation) Petrolina AEK Larnaca	1

==== League path ====
Pot 1
Team	Pts
(Spanish Basketball Federation) UCAM Murcia	111
(Hungarian Basketball Federation) Falco Szombathely	41
(Italian Basketball Federation) Pallacanestro Reggiana	39
(Hellenic Basketball Federation) PAOK mateco	35

Pot 2
Team	Pts
(Turkish Basketball Federation) Bursaspor	14
(Swiss Basketball) Fribourg Olympic	7
(Basketball Finland) Karhu Kauhajoki	3
(Romanian Basketball Federation) CSM CSU Oradea	3

Pot 3
Team	Pts
(Lithuanian Basketball Federation) Juventus	2
(Basketball Belgium) Windrose Giants Antwerp	2
(French Federation of Basketball) Élan Chalon	65.58^{†}
(German Basketball Federation) Löwen Braunschweig	54.75^{†}

Pot 4
Team	Pts
(Portuguese Basketball Federation) Porto	34.00^{†}
(Polish Basketball Federation) Start Lublin	21.00^{†}
(Basketball Federation of North Macedonia) Pelister	1.00^{†}
(Basketball Federation of Montenegro) SC Derby	1.00^{†}

=== Tournament 1 ===
The tournament 1 will be played on September 21–25, 2025.

Quarter-finals; September 21–22
(Slovak Basketball Association) Patrioti Levice	90
(Cyprus Basketball Federation) Petrolina AEK Larnaca	69
(Estonian Basketball Association) Kalev/Cramo	93
(Bulgarian Basketball Federation) Rilski Sportist	84
(Danish Basketball Association) Bakken Bears	84
(Georgian Basketball Federation) Kutaisi 2010	81
(Basketball Nederland) Heroes Den Bosch	80
(Basketball Federation of Kosovo) Trepça	68

Semi-finals; September 23
(Slovak Basketball Association) Patrioti Levice	81
(Estonian Basketball Association) Kalev/Cramo	69
(Danish Basketball Association) Bakken Bears	82
(Basketball Nederland) Heroes Den Bosch	77

Final; September 25
(Slovak Basketball Association) Patrioti Levice (2OT)	100
(Danish Basketball Association) Bakken Bears	98

Source: FIBA

=== Tournament 2 ===
The tournament 2 will be played on September 19–23, 2025.

Quarter-finals; September 19
(Hellenic Basketball Federation) PAOK mateco	79
(Basketball Federation of Montenegro) SC Derby	67
(Turkish Basketball Federation) Bursaspor	81
(German Basketball Federation) Löwen Braunschweig	74
(Italian Basketball Federation) Pallacanestro Reggiana	99
(Basketball Federation of North Macedonia) Pelister	87
(Romanian Basketball Federation) CSM CSU Oradea	71
(Basketball Belgium) Windrose Giants Antwerp	79

Semi-finals; September 21
(Hellenic Basketball Federation) PAOK mateco	73
(Turkish Basketball Federation) Bursaspor	92
(Italian Basketball Federation) Pallacanestro Reggiana	78
(Basketball Belgium) Windrose Giants Antwerp	81

Final; September 23
(Turkish Basketball Federation) Bursaspor	77
(Basketball Belgium) Windrose Giants Antwerp	58

Source: FIBA

=== Tournament 3 ===
The tournament 3 will be played on September 20–24, 2025.

Quarter-finals; September 20
(Spanish Basketball Federation) UCAM Murcia	100
(Polish Basketball Federation) Start Lublin	84
(Basketball Finland) Karhu Kauhajoki	89
(Lithuanian Basketball Federation) Juventus	103
(Hungarian Basketball Federation) Falco Szombathely	79
(Portuguese Basketball Federation) Porto	83
(Swiss Basketball) Fribourg Olympic	80
(French Federation of Basketball) Élan Chalon	107

Semi-finals; September 22
(Spanish Basketball Federation) UCAM Murcia	81
(Lithuanian Basketball Federation) Juventus	71
(Portuguese Basketball Federation) Porto	79
(French Federation of Basketball) Élan Chalon	100

Final; September 24
(Spanish Basketball Federation) UCAM Murcia	88
(French Federation of Basketball) Élan Chalon	96

Source: FIBA

== Regular season ==
The regular season will be played by 32 teams divided into eight groups of four in which 29 teams receive direct spots plus the three qualifying round tournaments winners. The regular season will begin on 7 October and will conclude on 17 December 2025. In each group, teams will play against each other home-and-away in a round-robin format where the eight group winners from each regular season group will qualify directly to the round of 16. Moreover, the second-placed and third-placed will qualify to the play-ins, where the series winners will qualify for the round of 16, while the remaining last-placed teams will be eliminated after the regular season.

A minimum of 18 countries will be represented in the regular season which will involve up to nine domestic league champions. Continental powerhouses like Alba Berlin, Joventut Badalona and Dreamland Gran Canaria will join the league after their previous stage in Euroleague Basketball competitions, others like Karditsa Iaponiki, Mersin and Trapani Shark will make their debut appearance in international competitions.

=== Group A ===
Pos	Team	Pld	W	L	PF	PA	PD	Pts	Qualification	VIL	HDB	PRO	WAR
1	(Lithuanian Basketball Federation) Rytas	6	4	2	564	534	+30	10	Advance to round of 16	—	116–90	98–79	93–85
2	(German Basketball Federation) MLP Academics Heidelberg	6	3	3	502	507	−5	9	Advance to play-ins	92–83	—	82–62	67–74
3	(Hellenic Basketball Federation) Promitheas Vikos Cola	6	3	3	481	507	−26	9	Advance to play-ins	111–95	89–83	—	72–85
4	(Polish Basketball Federation) Legia Warszawa	6	2	4	468	467	+1	8		77–79	83–88	64–68	—

Source: FIBA
Legend: Blue = home team win; Red = away team win.

=== Group B ===
Pos	Team	Pld	W	L	PF	PA	PD	Pts	Qualification	ALB	CHA	NYM	SAB
1	(German Basketball Federation) Alba Berlin	6	5	1	549	483	+66	11	Advance to round of 16	—	76–81	94–78	106–82
2	(French Federation of Basketball) Élan Chalon	6	5	1	539	513	+26	11	Advance to play-ins	91–100	—	97–84	84–71
3	(Czech Basketball Federation) ERA Nymburk	6	1	5	512	546	−34	7	Advance to play-ins	75–88	95–97	—	93–65
4	(Azerbaijan Basketball Federation) Sabah	6	1	5	486	544	−58	7		76–85	87–89	105–87	—

Source: FIBA
Legend: Blue = home team win; Red = away team win.

=== Group C ===
Pos	Team	Pld	W	L	PF	PA	PD	Pts	Qualification	CJB	CHO	HOL	BUR
1	(Spanish Basketball Federation) Joventut Badalona	6	6	0	531	455	+76	12	Advance to round of 16	—	91–73	97–95	94–67
2	(French Federation of Basketball) Cholet	6	3	3	539	524	+15	9	Advance to play-ins	87–89	—	92–103	109–77
3	(Israeli Basketball Association) Hapoel Netanel Holon	6	3	3	531	521	+10	9	Advance to play-ins	65–81	92–94	—	84–74
4	(Turkish Basketball Federation) Bursaspor	6	0	6	441	542	−101	6		68–79	72–84	83–92	—

Source: FIBA
Legend: Blue = home team win; Red = away team win.

=== Group D ===
Pos	Team	Pld	W	L	PF	PA	PD	Pts	Qualification	LLT	TOF	TPS	HER
1	(Spanish Basketball Federation) La Laguna Tenerife	6	4	2	519	474	+45	10	Advance to round of 16	—	80–70	80–83	108–85
2	(Turkish Basketball Federation) Tofaş	6	3	3	495	511	−16	9	Advance to play-ins	64–81	—	99–93	90–86
3	(Italian Basketball Federation) Trapani Shark	6	3	3	521	516	+5	9	Advance to play-ins	78–84	89–91	—	101–88
4	(Israeli Basketball Association) Bnei Penlink Herzliya	6	2	4	509	543	−34	8		94–86	82–81	74–77	—

Source: FIBA
Legend: Blue = home team win; Red = away team win.

=== Group E ===
Pos	Team	Pld	W	L	PF	PA	PD	Pts	Qualification	GSM	WUE	TS	IGO
1	(Turkish Basketball Federation) Galatasaray MCT Technic	6	5	1	534	474	+60	11	Advance to round of 16	—	89–83	79–80	94–82
2	(German Basketball Federation) Fitness First Würzburg Baskets	6	4	2	480	452	+28	10	Advance to play-ins	74–99	—	78–63	70–68
3	(Italian Basketball Federation) Pallacanestro Trieste	6	2	4	501	519	−18	8	Advance to play-ins	90–91	77–90	—	115–90
4	(Basketball Federation of Bosnia and Herzegovina) Igokea m:tel	6	1	5	452	522	−70	7		65–82	56–85	91–76	—

Source: FIBA
Legend: Blue = home team win; Red = away team win.

=== Group F ===
Pos	Team	Pld	W	L	PF	PA	PD	Pts	Qualification	AEK	OLA	PAT	VEF
1	(Hellenic Basketball Federation) AEK Betsson	6	5	1	494	431	+63	11	Advance to round of 16	—	91–77	99–88	95–64
2	(Hungarian Basketball Federation) NHSZ-Szolnoki Olajbányász	6	3	3	451	439	+12	9	Advance to play-ins	80–69	—	84–54	77–76
3	(Slovak Basketball Association) Patrioti Levice	6	3	3	461	467	−6	9	Advance to play-ins	69–71	73–71	—	85–69
4	(Latvian Basketball Association) VEF Rīga	6	1	5	411	480	−69	7		53–69	76–62	73–92	—

Source: FIBA
Legend: Blue = home team win; Red = away team win.

=== Group G ===
Pos	Team	Pld	W	L	PF	PA	PD	Pts	Qualification	UNI	MSK	KAR	OOS
1	(Spanish Basketball Federation) Unicaja	6	6	0	575	435	+140	12	Advance to round of 16	—	97–66	115–84	102–80
2	(Turkish Basketball Federation) Mersin	6	4	2	415	404	+11	10	Advance to play-ins	77–100	—	81–73	84–76
3	(Hellenic Basketball Federation) Karditsa Iaponiki	6	2	4	461	519	−58	8	Advance to play-ins	55–72	72–80	—	82–78
4	(Basketball Belgium) Filou Oostende	6	0	6	563	656	−93	6		73–89	86–104	93–95	—

Source: FIBA
Legend: Blue = home team win; Red = away team win.

=== Group H ===
Pos	Team	Pld	W	L	PF	PA	PD	Pts	Qualification	DGC	SPA	MSB	SLB
1	(Spanish Basketball Federation) Dreamland Gran Canaria	6	6	0	518	425	+93	12	Advance to round of 16	—	77–62	73–68	87–63
2	(Basketball Federation of Serbia) Spartak Office Shoes	6	3	3	469	462	+7	9	Advance to play-ins	83–93	—	74–73	99–69
3	(French Federation of Basketball) Le Mans	6	2	4	484	460	+24	8	Advance to play-ins	88–90	76–61	—	89–69
4	(Portuguese Basketball Federation) Benfica	6	1	5	429	553	−124	7		61–98	74–90	93–90	—

Source: FIBA
Legend: Blue = home team win; Red = away team win.

== Play-ins ==
The Play-ins will take place from 6 to 14 January 2026. The teams classified in second and third place in their respective groups of Basketball Champions League, went to the Play-ins. The winners will advance to the round of 16. First legs will be played on 6 January, second legs on 8 January and if required, third legs will be played on 13–14 January.

Team 1	Series	Team 2	Game 1	Game 2	Game 3
MLP Academics Heidelberg (Germany)	0–2	(Czech Republic) ERA Nymburk	63–72	71–78	—
Tofaş (Turkey)	2–1	(France) Cholet	89–75	86–105	84–82
Hapoel Netanel Holon (Israel)	—^{1}	(Italy) Trapani Shark	38–5^{1}	—	—
Élan Chalon (France)	2–0	(Greece) Promitheas Vikos Cola	93–78	92–82	—
Fitness First Würzburg Baskets (Germany)	2–1	(Slovakia) Patrioti Levice	89–92	74–56	92–71
NHSZ-Szolnoki Olajbányász (Hungary)	1–2	(Italy) Pallacanestro Trieste	62–82	89–80	86–87
Mersin (Turkey)	0–2	(France) Le Mans	65–92	83–113	—
Spartak Office Shoes (Serbia)	0–2	(Greece) Karditsa Iaponiki	82–89	75–84	—

Notes:

^1 According to Article 14.5.4 of the Basketball Champions League Competition Regulations, a club that loses any game by forfeit or by default in the Play-Ins and the Play-Offs shall lose the series.

== Round of 16 ==
The Round of 16 will take place from January 20 until March 18, 2026. The groups will be formed by the winners of each Regular Season Group and by eight Play-Ins winners. The 16 teams will be divided in 4 groups, 4 teams each. The first two of each groups advance to the quarter-finals.

=== Group I ===
Pos	Team	Pld	W	L	PF	PA	PD	Pts	Qualification	VIL	GSM	MSB	HOL
1	(Lithuanian Basketball Federation) Rytas	6	4	2	560	508	+52	10	Advance to quarter-finals	—	85–89	101–81	106–81
2	(Turkish Basketball Federation) Galatasaray MCT Technic	6	4	2	520	501	+19	10	Advance to quarter-finals	81–90	—	83–90	86–81
3	(French Federation of Basketball) Le Mans	6	4	2	538	527	+11	10		78–72	81–94	—	102–92
4	(Israeli Basketball Association) Hapoel Netanel Holon	6	0	6	511	593	−82	6		98–106	74–87	85–106	—

Source: Round of 16 Standings
Legend: Blue = home team win; Red = away team win.

=== Group J ===
Pos	Team	Pld	W	L	PF	PA	PD	Pts	Qualification	AEK	ALB	TOF	KAR
1	(Hellenic Basketball Federation) AEK Betsson	6	6	0	548	481	+67	12	Advance to quarter-finals	—	88–80	96–88	88–73
2	(German Basketball Federation) Alba Berlin	6	4	2	491	482	+9	10	Advance to quarter-finals	88–93	—	69–60	84–80
3	(Turkish Basketball Federation) Tofaş	6	1	5	511	529	−18	7		90–93	90–94	—	90–98
4	(Hellenic Basketball Federation) Karditsa Iaponiki	6	1	5	463	521	−58	7		62–90	71–76	79–93	—

Source: Round of 16 Standings
Legend: Blue = home team win; Red = away team win.

=== Group K ===
Pos	Team	Pld	W	L	PF	PA	PD	Pts	Qualification	UNI	CJB	CHA	WUE
1	(Spanish Basketball Federation) Unicaja	6	4	2	504	462	+42	10	Advance to quarter-finals	—	86–74	111–82	90–85
2	(Spanish Basketball Federation) Joventut Badalona	6	4	2	505	479	+26	10	Advance to quarter-finals	71–66	—	107–75	91–84
3	(French Federation of Basketball) Élan Chalon	6	2	4	479	534	−55	8		70–80	85–77	—	86–75
4	(German Basketball Federation) Fitness First Würzburg Baskets	6	2	4	491	504	−13	8		80–71	83–85	84–81	—

Source: Round of 16 Standings
Legend: Blue = home team win; Red = away team win.

=== Group L ===
Pos	Team	Pld	W	L	PF	PA	PD	Pts	Qualification	LLT	NYM	DGC	TS
1	(Spanish Basketball Federation) La Laguna Tenerife	6	4	2	482	447	+35	10	Advance to quarter-finals	—	104–80	79–76	84–82
2	(Czech Basketball Federation) ERA Nymburk	6	3	3	464	483	−19	9	Advance to quarter-finals	55–69	—	64–67	82–76
3	(Spanish Basketball Federation) Dreamland Gran Canaria	6	3	3	462	452	+10	9		72–70	82–92	—	71–77
4	(Italian Basketball Federation) Pallacanestro Trieste	6	2	4	472	498	−26	8		82–76	85–91	70–94	—

Source: Round of 16 Standings
Legend: Blue = home team win; Red = away team win.

== Playoffs ==
The playoffs will begin on 1 April 2026 and ends with the 2026 Basketball Champions League Final Four. The 8 qualified clubs have been ranked according to their final position within their respective group during the Round of 16 and their place in the Draw was based on this ranking. The teams having finished 1st of their Round of 16 group was placed in Pot 1, the teams having finished 2nd of their Round of 16 group was placed in Pot 2.

=== Qualified teams ===
Key to colors
Seeded teams	Unseeded teams

Group	Winners	Runners-up
I	(Lithuanian Basketball Federation) Rytas	(Turkish Basketball Federation) Galatasaray MCT Technic
J	(Hellenic Basketball Federation) AEK Betsson	(German Basketball Federation) Alba Berlin
K	(Spanish Basketball Federation) Unicaja	(Spanish Basketball Federation) Joventut Badalona
L	(Spanish Basketball Federation) La Laguna Tenerife	(Czech Basketball Federation) ERA Nymburk

=== Bracket ===
Quarterfinals
1 April–15 April
(Spanish Basketball Federation) Unicaja	72	88	–
(German Basketball Federation) Alba Berlin	69	85	–
1 April–15 April
(Hellenic Basketball Federation) AEK Betsson	87	66	72
(Spanish Basketball Federation) Joventut Badalona	84	88	67
1 April–15 April
(Lithuanian Basketball Federation) Rytas	77	70	–
(Czech Basketball Federation) ERA Nymburk	70	69	–
1 April–15 April
(Spanish Basketball Federation) La Laguna Tenerife	84	62	99
(Turkish Basketball Federation) Galatasaray MCT Technic	83	64	59

Semifinals
7 May
(Spanish Basketball Federation) Unicaja	65
(Hellenic Basketball Federation) AEK Betsson	78
7 May
(Lithuanian Basketball Federation) Rytas	87
(Spanish Basketball Federation) La Laguna Tenerife	69

Final
9 May
(Hellenic Basketball Federation) AEK Betsson	86
(Lithuanian Basketball Federation) Rytas	92
Third place
9 May
(Spanish Basketball Federation) Unicaja	85
(Spanish Basketball Federation) La Laguna Tenerife	80

=== Quarterfinals ===
The quarterfinals will be played in a best-of-3 series and start on April 1. The seeded teams will play the first games of the Quarter-Finals at home and these games are scheduled on April 1; reverse fixtures are to be played on April 7 and 8; potential third games of the series would happen on April 15.

Team 1	Series	Team 2	Game 1	Game 2	Game 3
Unicaja (Spain)	2–0	(Germany) Alba Berlin	72–69	88–85	—
AEK Betsson (Greece)	2–1	(Spain) Joventut Badalona	87–84	66–88	72–67
Rytas (Lithuania)	2–0	(Czech Republic) ERA Nymburk	77–70	70–69	—
La Laguna Tenerife (Spain)	2–1	(Turkey) Galatasaray MCT Technic	84–83	62–64	99–59

== Individual awards ==
=== Season awards ===
The annual season awards was announced during the Final Four weekend.

Award	Player	Club
Most Valuable Player	(United States) Frank Bartley	(Greece) AEK Betsson
Final Four MVP	(Germany) Simonas Lukošius	(Lithuania) Rytas
Defensive Player of the Year	(Montenegro) Kendrick Perry	(Spain) Unicaja
Best Young Player	(Germany) Jack Kayil	(Germany) Alba Berlin
Best Coach	(Serbia) Dragan Šakota	(Greece) AEK Betsson

==== Star Lineup ====
First Team		Second Team	
Player	Team	Player	Team
(Spain) Ricky Rubio	(Spain) Joventut Badalona	(Brazil) Marcelo Huertas	(Spain) Lenovo Tenerife
(Poland) Jerrick Harding	(Lithuania) Rytas	(United States) Errick McCollum	(Turkey) Galatasaray MCT Technic
(United States) Frank Bartley	(Greece) AEK Betsson	(Germany) Jack Kayil	(Germany) Alba Berlin
(United States) RaiQuan Gray	(Greece) AEK Betsson	(Dominican Republic) Chris Duarte	(Spain) Unicaja
(Georgia (country)) Giorgi Shermadini	(Spain) Canarias	(Lithuania) Artūras Gudaitis	(Lithuania) Rytas

=== MVP of the Group Phase ===
Player	Club	Ref.
(Gabon) Chris Silva	(Greece) AEK Betsson	

=== Team of the Group Phase ===
Player	Team	Ref.
(Spain) Ricky Rubio	(Spain) Joventut Badalona	
(Cameroon) Jeremiah Hill	(France) Élan Chalon	
(United States) Will Cummings	(Turkey) Galatasaray MCT Technic	
(Australia) Jack White	(Turkey) Mersin	
(Gabon) Chris Silva	(Greece) AEK Betsson	

=== MVP of the Play-ins ===
Player	Club	Ref.
(United States) Brandon Jefferson	(Greece) Karditsa Iaponiki	

=== Team of the Play-ins ===
Player	Team	Ref.
(United States) Brandon Jefferson	(Greece) Karditsa Iaponiki	
(Canada) Nate Darling	(France) Élan Chalon	
(United States) Charles Thompson	(Germany) Fitness First Würzburg Baskets	
(United States) Jahmi'us Ramsey	(Italy) Pallacanestro Trieste	
(Lithuania) Marek Blaževič	(Turkey) Tofaş	

=== MVP of the Round of 16 ===
Player	Club	Ref.
(United States) RaiQuan Gray	(Greece) AEK Betsson	

=== Team of the Round of 16 ===
Player	Team	Ref.
(Lithuania) Ignas Sargiūnas	(Lithuania) Rytas	
(United States) Errick McCollum	(Turkey) Galatasaray MCT Technic	
(United States) RaiQuan Gray	(Greece) AEK Betsson	
(United States) Frank Bartley	(Greece) AEK Betsson	
(Croatia) Ante Tomić	(Spain) Joventut Badalona	

=== MVP of the Quarterfinals ===
Player	Club	Ref.
(Georgia (country)) Giorgi Shermadini	(Spain) La Laguna Tenerife	

=== Team of the Quarterfinals ===
Player	Team	Ref.
(Spain) Ricky Rubio	(Spain) Joventut Badalona	
(United States) Jerrick Harding	(Lithuania) Rytas	
(United States) Frank Bartley	(Greece) AEK Betsson	
(United States) James Nunnally	(Greece) AEK Betsson	
(Georgia (country)) Giorgi Shermadini	(Spain) La Laguna Tenerife	
