= Basketball Champions League Top Scorer =

Award of the Basketball Champions League

The Basketball Champions League Top Scorer, or FIBA Champions League Top Scorer, is the annual award of the professional club basketball league, the Basketball Champions League (BCL), that is given to the league's Top Scorer throughout the Champions League season. The Basketball Champions League is, along with the EuroCup, one of the two secondary level European-wide professional club basketball leagues in Europe. The award is given by FIBA.

== Top scorers ==
Key
Player (X)	Name of the player and number of times they had won the award at that point (if more than one)
Nationality	Nationality as registered by FIBA, player may hold more nationalities
‡	Denotes the club were BCL champions in the same season

Season	Player	Position	Nationality	Club	PPG	Ref.
2016–17	Nick Minnerath	Forward	United States	(Russia) Avtodor Saratov	20.3	
2017–18	Kevin Punter	Shooting guard	United States	(Greece) AEK	21.1	
2018–19	Vince Hunter	Forward	United States	(Greece) AEK	18.0	
2019–20	Justin Dentmon	Point guard	United States	(France) Élan Béarnais	20.9	
2020–21	Bonzie Colson	Small forward	United States	(France) SIG Strasbourg	18.2	
2021–22	Levi Randolph	Shooting guard	United States	(Belgium) Filou Oostende	18.1	
2022–23	Marcus Foster	Shooting guard	United States	(Lithuania) Rytas Vilnius	20.6	
2023–24	Kyle Guy	Shooting guard	United States	(Spain) Lenovo Tenerife	21.5	
2024–25	Amin Stevens	Forward	United States	(Israel) Maccabi Ramat Gan	21.9	
2025–26	Jerrick Harding	Point guard	United States	(Lithuania) Rytas Vilnius ‡	19.4	
