= Basketball Champions League Best Young Player =

Annual award of the Basketball Champions League

The Basketball Champions League (BCL) Best Young Player in an annual award of the Basketball Champions League. The Basketball Champions League is, along with the EuroCup, one of the two secondary level European-wide professional club basketball leagues in Europe. Only players who are aged 22 and under qualify for the award. The award is given to the under age 22 player that the Basketball Champions League deems to be its best young player of the season. The award is given by FIBA. The award began with the league's inaugural 2016–17 season.

== Voting criteria ==
The Basketball Champions League Best Young Player is chosen by a vote of the fans online, a vote of media journalists and representatives, and a vote of all of the head coaches of all of the teams in each season of the league. The fans, the media, and the league's head coaches each get 1/3 of the vote distribution.

== Winners ==
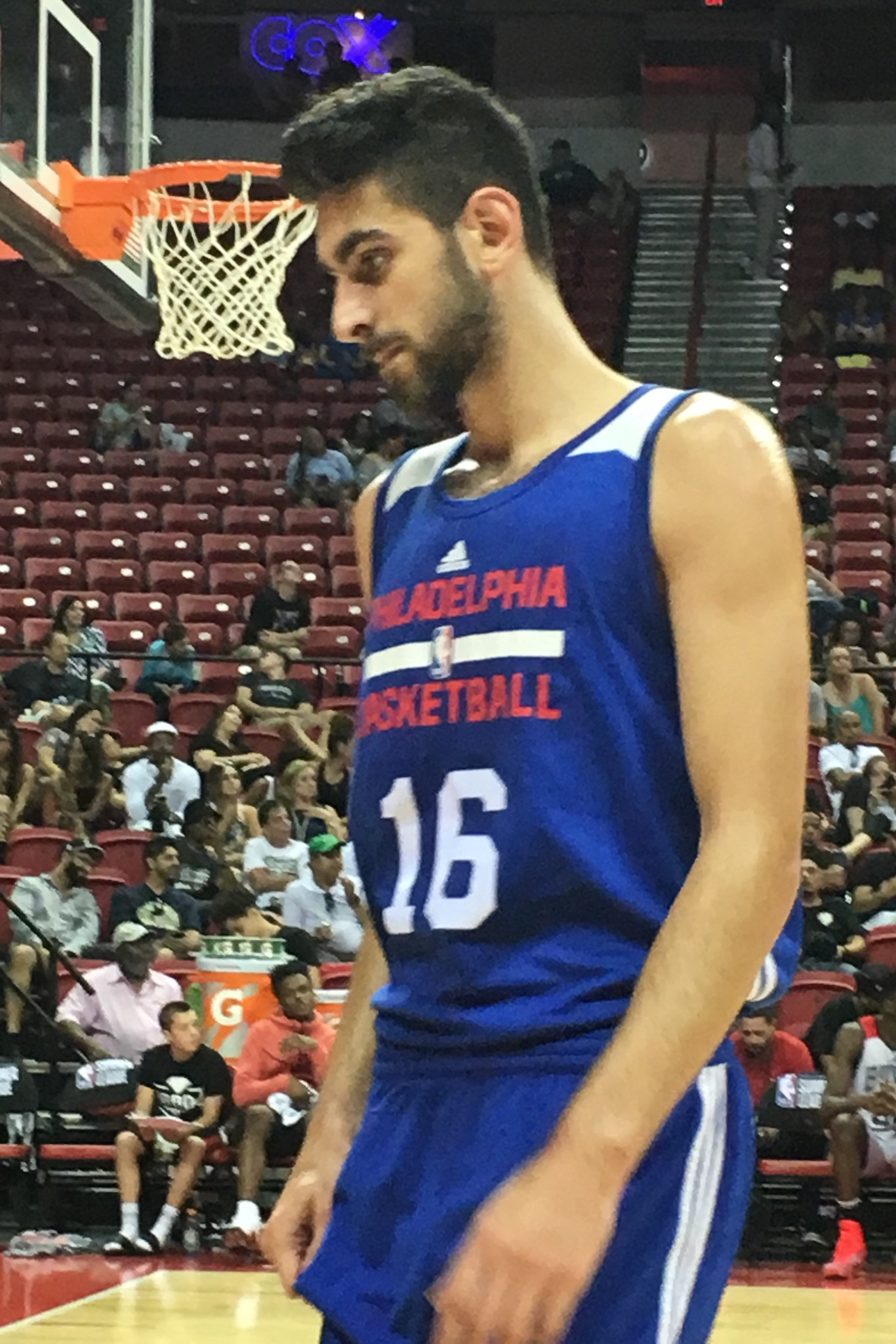
Furkan Korkmaz was the inaugural winner of the award.

Key
Player (X)	Name of the player and number of times they had won the award at that point (if more than one)
Nationality	Nationality as registered by FIBA, player may hold more nationalities
†	Indicates multiple award winners in the same season
‡	Denotes the club were BCL champions in the same season

Season	Player	Position	Nationality	Club	Ref.
2016–17	Furkan Korkmaz	Forward	Turkey	(Turkey) Banvit	
2017–18	Arnoldas Kulboka	Forward	Lithuania	(Italy) SikeliArchivi Capo d'Orlando	
2018–19	Tamir Blatt	Guard	Israel	(Israel) Hapoel Jerusalem	
2019–20	Carlos Alocén	Guard	Spain	(Spain) Zaragoza	
2020–21	Yoan Makoundou	Forward	France	(France) Cholet	
2021–22	Giordano Bortolani	Shooting guard	Italy	(Italy) NutriBullet Treviso	
2022–23	Sadık Emir Kabaca	Power forward	Turkey	(Turkey) Galatasaray Nef	
2023–24	Tidjane Salaün	Small forward	France	(France) Cholet Basket	
2024–25	Nolan Traoré	Point guard	France	(France) Saint-Quentin	
2025–26	Jack Kayil	Shooting guard	Germany	(Germany) Alba Berlin	
