= Basketball Champions League MVP =

Award of the Basketball Champions League

The Basketball Champions League MVP, or Basketball Champions League MVP of the Season (also FIBA Champions League MVP), is the annual award bestowed to the player that is deemed to be the "Most Valuable Player" during the full season of the Basketball Champions League (BCL). The Basketball Champions League is, along with the EuroCup, one of the two secondary level European-wide professional club basketball leagues in Europe. The award is given by FIBA. The award has existed since the Basketball Champions League's inaugural 2016–17 season.

== Voting criteria ==
The Basketball Champions League MVP is chosen by a vote of the fans online, a vote of media journalists and representatives, and a vote of all of the head coaches of all of the teams in each season of the league. The fans, the media, and the league's head coaches each get 1/3 of the vote distribution.

== Winners ==
^	Denotes player who is still active in the BCL
*	Inducted into the FIBA Hall of Fame
†	Denotes player whose team won championship that year
Player (X)	Denotes the number of times the player has received the award

- Nationality as registered by FIBA. Player may hold more nationalities.

Season	Player	Position	Nationality	Club	Ref.
2016–17	Jordan Theodore	Point guard	North Macedonia (Note: Theodore, born in Englewood, New Jersey, is an American citizen. However he received a Macedonian passport in 2017 and represents the North Macedonia national basketball team in international competition.)	(Turkey) Banvit	
2017–18	Manny Harris†	Small forward	United States	(Greece) AEK Athens	
2018–19	Tyrese Rice	Point guard	Montenegro (Note: Rice, born in Richmond, Virginia, is an American citizen. However he received a Montenegrin passport in 2013 and represents the Montenegrin national basketball team in international competition.)	(Germany) Brose Bamberg	
2019–20	Keith Langford	Shooting guard	United States	(Greece) AEK Athens	
2020–21	Bonzie Colson	Small forward	United States	(France) SIG Strasbourg	
2021–22	Chima Moneke	Power forward	Nigeria	(Spain) Baxi Manresa	
2022–23	T. J. Shorts†	Point guard	North Macedonia (Note: Shorts, born in Irvine, California, is an American citizen. However he received a Macedonian passport in 2022 and represents the North Macedonia national basketball team in international competition.)	(Germany) Telekom Baskets Bonn	
2023–24	Marcelo Huertas^	Point guard	Brazil	(Spain) Lenovo Tenerife	
2024–25	Marcelo Huertas^ (2)	Point guard	Brazil	(Spain) La Laguna Tenerife	
2025–26	Frank Bartley^	Shooting guard	United States	(Greece) AEK Athens	
