= 2024 BBL Playoffs =

German basketball postseason

Tournament details
- Country: Germany
- Dates: 17 May – 17 June
- Teams: 10

Final positions
- Champions: Bayern Munich
- Runners-up: Alba Berlin
- Semifinalists: s.Oliver Würzburg; Niners Chemnitz

The 2024 BBL Playoffs was the concluding postseason of the 2023–24 Basketball Bundesliga season. The playoffs started on 17 May and ended on 14 June 2024.

== Playoff qualifying ==
Seed	Team	Record	Clinched			
Seed	Team	Record	Play-in berth	Playoff berth	Seeded team	Top seed
1	Bayern Munich	28–6	31 March	20 April	5 May	10 May
2	Alba Berlin	27–7	7 April	25 April	8 May	
3	Niners Chemnitz	26–8	30 March	20 April	8 May	
4	Ratiopharm Ulm	24–19	13 April	5 May	12 May	
5	Würzburg Baskets	24–10	7 April	1 May		
6	Rasta Vechta	21–13	21 April	8 May		
†	Riesen Ludwigsburg	20–14	27 April			
†	Telekom Baskets Bonn	18–16	27 April			
†	Baskets Oldenburg	18–16	8 May			
†	Hamburg Towers	17–17	12 May			

† Teams ranked 7 through 10 will participate in the play-in tournament to determine seeds 7 and 8.

== Play-in tournament ==
Only the top six seeds advanced directly to the playoffs, while the next four seeds participated in a play-in tournament. The 7th-place team hosted the 8th-place team in the double-chance round needing to win one game to advance, with the winner clinching the 7th seed in the playoffs. The 9th-place team hosted the 10th-place team in the elimination round requiring two wins to advance, with the loser being eliminated from the competition. The loser in the double-chance round hosted the elimination-round game-winner, with the winner clinching the 8th seed and the loser being eliminated. The higher seeded teams had homecourt advantage.

Play-in games
7	Telekom Baskets Bonn	90
8	Riesen Ludwigsburg	69
9	Baskets Oldenburg	81
10	Hamburg Towers	93

No. 8 seed game
8	Riesen Ludwigsburg	91
10	Hamburg Towers	78

Final seeds
Telekom Baskets Bonn	No. 7 seed
Riesen Ludwigsburg	No. 8 seed

Bold Game winner

=== Seed 9 vs Seed 10 ===
14 May 2024
18:30

Boxscore

Baskets Oldenburg	81–93	Hamburg Towers
Scoring by quarter: 22–27, 25–19, 17–28, 17–19
Pts: Geno Crandall 18; Rebs: Chapman, Izundu 5 Asts: Geno Crandall 11		Pts: V. J. King 24; Rebs: Hughes, Wohlfarth-Bottermann 7 Asts: Durham 6

Große EWE Arena, Oldenburg
Attendance: 6,200
Referees: Robert Lottermoser, Moritz Reiter, Christian Theis

=== Seed 7 vs Seed 8 ===
14 May 2024
20:30

Boxscore

Telekom Baskets Bonn	90–69	Riesen Ludwigsburg
Scoring by quarter: 32–13, 19–12, 17–28, 22–16
Pts: Brian Fobbs 20; Rebs: Flagg, Sengfelder 8 Asts: Frey 6		Pts: Deion Hammond 13; Rebs: Jonathan Bähre 5 Asts: Buie, Patrick 3

Telekom Dome, Bonn
Attendance: 4,620
Referees: Anne Panther, Gentian Cici, Steve Bittner

=== Winner Game 1 vs Loser Game 2 ===
16 May 2024
20:00

Boxscore

Riesen Ludwigsburg	91–78	Hamburg Towers
Scoring by quarter: 23–15, 22–20, 21–10, 25–33
Pts: Buie 26; Rebs: Polas Bartolo 8 Asts: Buie 6		Pts: Durham 34; Rebs: Wohlfarth-Bottermann 6 Asts: Christmas, Meisner 3

MHP-Arena, Ludwigsburg
Attendance: 1,387
Referees: Martin Matip, Christof Madinger, Carsten Straube

== Bracket ==
The rounds were played in a best-of-five format.

Quarterfinals
1	Bayern Munich	3
8	Riesen Ludwigsburg	1
4	Ratiopharm Ulm	1
5	s.Oliver Würzburg	3
2	Alba Berlin	3
7	Telekom Baskets Bonn	0
3	Niners Chemnitz	3
6	Rasta Vechta	1

Semifinals
1	Bayern Munich	3
5	s.Oliver Würzburg	0
2	Alba Berlin	3
3	Niners Chemnitz	2

Finals
1	Bayern Munich	3
2	Alba Berlin	1

== Quarterfinals ==
The quarterfinals were held from 17 to 24 May 2024 in a best-of-five format.

=== Bayern Munich vs Riesen Ludwigsburg ===
18 May 2024
20:30

Boxscore

Bayern Munich	98–102 (OT)	Riesen Ludwigsburg
Scoring by quarter: 26–18, 17–22, 22–15, 25–35, Overtime: 8–12
Pts: Carsen Edwards 25; Rebs: Serge Ibaka 9 Asts: Devin Booker 3		Pts: Silas Melson 33; Rebs: Desure Buie 9 Asts: Desure Buie 8
Ludwigsburg leads series 1–0

BMW Park, Munich
Attendance: 6,324
Referees: Anne Panther, Clemens Fritz, Radeesh Kattur

20 May 2024
17:00

Boxscore

Bayern Munich	83–67	Riesen Ludwigsburg
Scoring by quarter: 21–19, 22–14, 21–16, 19–18
Pts: Carsen Edwards 21; Rebs: Isaac Bonga 11; Asts: Carsen Edwards 7		Pts: Silas Melson 20; Rebs: Eddy Edigin 8 Asts: Desure Buie 5
Series tied, 1–1

BMW Park, Munich
Attendance: 6,402
Referees: Moritz Reiter, Benjamin Barth, Zulfikar Oruzgani

22 May 2024
18:30

Boxscore

Riesen Ludwigsburg	73–84	Bayern Munich
Scoring by quarter: 18–26, 19–19, 16–12, 20–27
Pts: Silas Melson 24; Rebs: Jeff Roberson 5 Asts: Desure Buie 5		Pts: Serge Ibaka 16; Rebs: Serge Ibaka 9 Asts: Serge Ibaka 5
Munich leads series 2–1

MHP-Arena, Ludwigsburg
Attendance: 3,306
Referees: Robert Lottermoser, Christof Madinger, Dennis Sirowi

24 May 2024
20:30

Boxscore

Riesen Ludwigsburg	69–76	Bayern Munich
Scoring by quarter: 11–17, 23–23, 23–21, 12–15
Pts: Eddy Edigin 15; Rebs: Eddy Edigin 14; Asts: Desure Buie 7		Pts: Carsen Edwards 22; Rebs: Isaac Bonga 9 Asts: Bonga, Lučić 4
Munich wins series 3–1

MHP-Arena, Ludwigsburg
Attendance: 3,452
Referees: Gentian Cici, Carsten Straube, Johannes Hack

=== Alba Berlin vs Telekom Baskets Bonn ===
17 May 2024
18:30

Boxscore

Alba Berlin	94–68	Telekom Baskets Bonn
Scoring by quarter: 17–14, 24–17, 27–20, 26–17
Pts: Matt Thomas 18; Rebs: Louis Olinde 7 Asts: Sterling Brown 8		Pts: Noah Kirkwood 14; Rebs: Noah Kirkwood 4 Asts: Fobbs, Watson Jr. 3
Berlin leads series 1–0

Mercedes-Benz Arena, Berlin
Attendance: 7,071
Referees: Gentian Cici, Steve Bittner, Dennis Sirowi

19 May 2024
17:00

Boxscore

Alba Berlin	83–70	Telekom Baskets Bonn
Scoring by quarter: 23–21, 21–19, 20–19, 19–11
Pts: Johannes Thiemann 15; Rebs: Christ Koumadje 11; Asts: Martin Hermannsson 8		Pts: Brian Fobbs 17; Rebs: Thomas Kennedy 5 Asts: Noah Kirkwood 3
Berlin leads series 2–0

Max-Schmeling-Halle, Berlin
Attendance: 6,887
Referees: Robert Lottermoser, Carsten Straube, Johannes Hack

21 May 2024
18:30

Boxscore

Telekom Baskets Bonn	86–93	Alba Berlin
Scoring by quarter: 20–20, 21–20, 27–28, 18–25
Pts: Thomas Kennedy 22; Rebs: Thomas Kennedy 6 Asts: Noah Kirkwood 7		Pts: Olinde, Thiemann 18; Rebs: Sterling Brown 8 Asts: Martin Hermannsson 6
Berlin wins series 3–0

Telekom Dome, Bonn
Attendance: 6,000
Referees: Martin Matip, Benjamin Barth, Oliver Krause

=== Niners Chemnitz vs Rasta Vechta ===
17 May 2024
20:30

Boxscore

Niners Chemnitz	83–77	Rasta Vechta
Scoring by quarter: 19–16, 23–18, 24–13, 17–30
Pts: DeAndre Lansdowne 22; Rebs: Garrett, Lansdowne 6 Asts: Van Beck 6		Pts: Tommy Kuhse 18; Rebs: Johann Grünloh 10; Asts: Chip Flanigan 4
Chemnitz leads series 1–0

Chemnitz Arena, Chemnitz
Attendance: 4,284
Referees: Robert Lottermoser, Moritz Reiter, Johannes Hack

19 May 2024
19:00

Boxscore

Niners Chemnitz	87–96	Rasta Vechta
Scoring by quarter: 18–15, 17–27, 28–27, 24–27
Pts: Van Beck 20; Rebs: Jonas Richter 11; Asts: Lansdowne, Van Beck 3		Pts: Joel Aminu 30; Rebs: Aminu, Ferner 5 Asts: Tommy Kuhse 5
Series tied, 1–1

Chemnitz Arena, Chemnitz
Attendance: 4,849
Referees: Gentian Cici, Christof Madinger, Steve Bittner

21 May 2024
20:30

Boxscore

Rasta Vechta	76–84	Niners Chemnitz
Scoring by quarter: 24–17, 17–29, 19–23, 16–15
Pts: Joel Aminu 26; Rebs: Groves, Grünloh 6 Asts: Chip Flanigan 5		Pts: Van Beck 20; Rebs: Van Beck 7 Asts: three players 3
Chemnitz leads series 2–1

Rasta Dome, Vechta
Attendance: 3,140
Referees: Anne Panther, Carsten Straube, Zulfikar Oruzgani

23 May 2024
18:30

Boxscore

Rasta Vechta	67–84	Niners Chemnitz
Scoring by quarter: 14–27, 12–17, 23–16, 18–24
Pts: Tommy Kuhse 18; Rebs: Johann Grünloh 6 Asts: Tommy Kuhse 3		Pts: Jeff Garrett 19; Rebs: Jonas Richter 6 Asts: DeAndre Lansdowne 7
Chemnitz wins series 3–1

Rasta Dome, Vechta
Attendance: 3,140
Referees: Martin Matip, Clemens Fritz, Oliver Krause

=== Ratiopharm Ulm vs Würzburg Baskets ===
18 May 2024
18:30

Boxscore

Ratiopharm Ulm	65–78	Würzburg Baskets
Scoring by quarter: 20–23, 18–17, 18–18, 9–20
Pts: Justinian Jessup 11; Rebs: Núñez, Williams 6 Asts: Georginho 4		Pts: Otis Livingston II 22; Rebs: Klassen, Seljaas 7 Asts: Livingston II, Washington 4
Würzburg leads series 1–0

ratiopharm arena, Ulm
Attendance: 6,000
Referees: Martin Matip, Benjamin Barth, Oliver Krause

20 May 2024
19:00

Boxscore

Ratiopharm Ulm	100–64	Würzburg Baskets
Scoring by quarter: 22–22, 28–17, 26–11, 24–14
Pts: L. J. Figueroa 21; Rebs: Dadiet, Herkenhoff 5 Asts: Juan Núñez 6		Pts: three players 14; Rebs: Darius Perry 6 Asts: Darius Perry 7
Series tied, 1–1

ratiopharm arena, Ulm
Attendance: 6,000
Referees: Anne Panther, Clemens Fritz, Christian Theis

22 May 2024
20:30

Boxscore

Würzburg Baskets	82–79	Ratiopharm Ulm
Scoring by quarter: 20–18, 24–16, 20–23, 18–22
Pts: Zac Seljaas 17; Rebs: Javon Bess 12; Asts: Darius Perry 7		Pts: Thomas Klepeisz 15; Rebs: Trevion Williams 7 Asts: Georginho 7
Würzburg leads series 2–1

s.Oliver Arena, Würzburg
Attendance: 3,140
Referees: Moritz Reiter, Gentian Cici, Radeesh Kattur

24 May 2024
18:30

Boxscore

Würzburg Baskets	75–72	Ratiopharm Ulm
Scoring by quarter: 16–14, 20–17, 17–23, 22–18
Pts: Zac Seljaas 19; Rebs: Isaiah Washington 8 Asts: Javon Bess 4		Pts: Karim Jallow 15; Rebs: Karim Jallow 7 Asts: Juan Núñez 6
Würzburg wins series 3–1

s.Oliver Arena, Würzburg
Attendance: 3,140
Referees: Robert Lottermoser, Christof Madinger, Dennis Sirowi

== Semifinals ==
The semifinals were held from 28 May to 6 June 2024 in a best-of-five format.

=== Bayern Munich vs Würzburg Baskets ===
29 May 2024
20:30

Boxscore

Bayern Munich	91–76	Würzburg Baskets
Scoring by quarter: 21–11, 28–16, 25–23, 17–26
Pts: Serge Ibaka 18; Rebs: Bonga, Lučić 5 Asts: Carsen Edwards 5		Pts: Max Ugrai 18; Rebs: Javon Bess 9 Asts: Darius Perry 4
Munich leads series 1–0

BMW Park, Munich
Attendance: 6,198
Referees: Anne Panther, Carsten Straube, Steve Bittner

31 May 2024
20:30

Boxscore

Bayern Munich	99–75	Würzburg Baskets
Scoring by quarter: 22–21, 26–23, 25–16, 26–15
Pts: three players 14; Rebs: Serge Ibaka 9 Asts: Andreas Obst 6		Pts: Zac Seljaas 17; Rebs: Zac Seljaas 6 Asts: Darius Perry 8
Munich leads series 2–0

BMW Park, Munich
Attendance: 6,500
Referees: Moritz Reiter, Christof Madinger, Dennis Sirowi

2 June 2024
15:00

Boxscore

Würzburg Baskets	61–75	Bayern Munich
Scoring by quarter: 18–12, 15–26, 13–22, 15–15
Pts: Darius Perry 21; Rebs: Javon Bess 7 Asts: Darius Perry 7		Pts: Serge Ibaka 19; Rebs: Serge Ibaka 8 Asts: Bolmaro, Bonga 3
Munich wins series 3–0

s.Oliver Arena, Würzburg
Attendance: 3,140
Referees: Robert Lottermoser, Martin Matip, Steve Bittner

=== Alba Berlin vs Niners Chemnitz ===
28 May 2024
20:30

Boxscore

Alba Berlin	82–95	Niners Chemnitz
Scoring by quarter: 19–20, 13–24, 27–28, 23–23
Pts: Sterling Brown 24; Rebs: Brown, Thiemann 5 Asts: Martin Hermannsson 4		Pts: Kevin Yebo 23; Rebs: three players 6 Asts: Kajami-Keane, Van Beck 6
Chemnitz leads series 1–0

Uber Arena, Berlin
Attendance: 8,147
Referees: Martin Matip, Gentian Cici, Johannes Hack

31 May 2024
18:30

Boxscore

Alba Berlin	86–64	Niners Chemnitz
Scoring by quarter: 27–17, 21–23, 21–12, 17–12
Pts: Louis Olinde 13; Rebs: Yanni Wetzell 8 Asts: Martin Hermannsson 6		Pts: Yebo 13; Rebs: Garrett, Lansdowne 7 Asts: four players 2
Series tied, 1–1

Max-Schmeling-Halle, Berlin
Attendance: 9,000
Referees: Robert Lottermoser, Benjamin Barth, Zulfikar Oruzgani

2 June 2024
17:00

Boxscore

Niners Chemnitz	84–72	Alba Berlin
Scoring by quarter: 14–26, 15–11, 24–24, 31–11
Pts: Garrett, Kajami-Keane 15; Rebs: Jeff Garrett 9 Asts: Kaza Kajami-Keane 7		Pts: Thiemann, Thomas 13; Rebs: Yanni Wetzell 6 Asts: Louis Olinde 4
Chemnitz leads series 2–1

Chemnitz Arena, Chemnitz
Attendance: 5,000
Referees: Anne Panther, Gentian Cici, Christof Madinger

4 June 2024
18:30

Boxscore

Niners Chemnitz	85–96	Alba Berlin
Scoring by quarter: 28–27, 23–16, 17–22, 17–31
Pts: DeAndre Lansdowne 19; Rebs: Aher Uguak 6 Asts: Kaza Kajami-Keane 5		Pts: Sterling Brown 25; Rebs: Sterling Brown 7 Asts: Brown, Hermannsson 4
Series tied, 2–2

Chemnitz Arena, Chemnitz
Attendance: 5,000
Referees: Robert Lottermoser, Moritz Reiter, Johannes Hack

6 June 2024
18:30

Boxscore

Alba Berlin	97–84	Niners Chemnitz
Scoring by quarter: 30–28, 18–25, 26–20, 23–11
Pts: Matt Thomas 24; Rebs: Christ Koumadje 10; Asts: Brown, Thomas 5		Pts: Garrett, Yebo 16; Rebs: Jeff Garrett 5 Asts: Kaza Kajami-Keane 7
Berlin wins series 3–2

Uber Arena, Berlin
Attendance: 9,781
Referees: Robert Lottermoser, Anne Panther, Martin Matip

== Finals ==
The finals was held from 8 to 14 June 2024 in a best-of-five format.

8 June 2024
20:30

Boxscore

Bayern Munich	79–67	Alba Berlin
Scoring by quarter: 26–19, 20–24, 23–19, 10–5
Pts: Vladimir Lučić 17; Rebs: Serge Ibaka 5 Asts: Vladimir Lučić 5		Pts: Sterling Brown 15; Rebs: Christ Koumadje 7 Asts: Sterling Brown 5
Munich leads series 1–0

BMW Park, Munich
Attendance: 6,500
Referees: Robert Lottermoser, Martin Matip, Johannes Hack

10 June 2024
20:30

Boxscore

Bayern Munich	70–79	Alba Berlin
Scoring by quarter: 26–19, 6–20, 18–17, 20–23
Pts: Carsen Edwards 17; Rebs: Devin Booker 8 Asts: Ibaka, Obst 4		Pts: Matt Thomas 21; Rebs: Olinde, Wetzell 7 Asts: Sterling Brown 9
Series tied, 1–1

BMW Park, Munich
Attendance: 6,500
Referees: Anne Panther, Moritz Reiter, Christof Madinger

12 June 2024
20:30

Boxscore

Alba Berlin	63–67	Bayern Munich
Scoring by quarter: 14–17, 14–14, 17–17, 18–19
Pts: Matt Thomas 17; Rebs: Malte Delow 7 Asts: Sterling Brown 4		Pts: Andreas Obst 14; Rebs: Booker, Lučić 7 Asts: Nick Weiler-Babb 6
Munich leads series 2–1

Uber Arena, Berlin
Attendance: 11,321
Referees: Robert Lottermoser, Gentian Cici, Zulfikar Oruzgani

14 June 2024
18:00

Boxscore

Alba Berlin	82–88	Bayern Munich
Scoring by quarter: 21–22, 25–22, 6–21, 30–23
Pts: Sterling Brown 25; Rebs: Johannes Thiemann 10; Asts: Sterling Brown 6		Pts: Carsen Edwards 29; Rebs: Devin Booker 9 Asts: Isaac Bonga 3
Munich wins series 3–1

Uber Arena, Berlin
Attendance: 9,668
Referees: Robert Lottermoser, Anne Panther, Martin Matip
