= 2023–24 BBL-Pokal =

- Dates: 23 September 2023 – 18 February 2024
- Games played: 23
- Teams: 24

Regular season
- Season MVP: Sylvain Francisco

Finals
- Champions: Bayern Munich (5th title)
- Runners-up: ratiopharm Ulm

The 2023–24 BBL-Pokal was the 57th season of the BBL-Pokal, the domestic cup competition of the Basketball Bundesliga (BBL).

Bayern Munich won their fifth overall title after a win over ratiopharm Ulm.

== Format ==
The top eight teams of the 2022–23 Basketball Bundesliga received a bye and move on to the round of 16. The teams that placed ninth to 16th were seeded and the two relegated teams, together with the top six-placed teams from the ProA from the previous season, were unseeded for the draw. The team from the unseeded group had home-advantage. After that an open draw was used for the other rounds.

== Schedule ==
The rounds of the 2023–24 competition were scheduled as follows:

Round	Matches
First round	22–24 September 2023
Round of 16	14–15 October 2023
Quarterfinals	9–10 December 2023
Final four	17–18 February 2024

== First round ==
The draw took place on 13 July 2023. The games took place from 22 to 24 September 2023.

22 September 2023
20:00

Boxscore

Medi Bayreuth	82–89	MLP Academics Heidelberg
Scoring by quarter: 22–26, 30–24, 13–19, 17–20
Pts: Selim Fofana 17; Rebs: Aaron Carver 9 Asts: Shane Gatling 8		Pts: Jeffrey Carroll 19; Rebs: Isaiah Whaley 8 Asts: Bennet Hundt 10

Oberfrankenhalle, Bayreuth
Attendance: 2,169
Referees: Christof Madinger, Nermin Hodzic, Tamer Arik

23 September 2023
18:30

Boxscore

Rasta Vechta	84–76	Rostock Seawolves
Scoring by quarter: 24–20, 18–19, 21–15, 21–22
Pts: Tommy Kuhse 26; Rebs: Ferner, Iwundu 5 Asts: Tommy Kuhse 6		Pts: Derrick Alston Jr. 14; Rebs: Derrick Alston Jr. 6 Asts: Robi Amaize 4

Rasta Dome, Vechta
Attendance: 3,448
Referees: Gentian Cici, Carsten Straube, Tim Krause

23 September 2023
18:30

Boxscore

Giessen 46ers	79–73	Crailsheim Merlins
Scoring by quarter: 26–17, 16–18, 20–14, 17–24
Pts: Duane Wilson 22; Rebs: Stefan Fundić 12; Asts: Simon Krajčovič 6		Pts: Cook, Oduro 17; Rebs: Prince Oduro 8 Asts: Baggette 7

Sporthalle Gießen-Ost, Gießen
Attendance: 2,397
Referees: Enrico Streit, Moritz Krüper, Radeesh Kattur

23 September 2023
20:00

Boxscore

Tigers Tübingen	64–78	Löwen Braunschweig
Scoring by quarter: 17–22, 15–16, 13–19, 19–21
Pts: Jhivvan Irvine 20; Rebs: Krišs Helmanis 8 Asts: Jhivvan Irvine 4		Pts: Barra Njie 18; Rebs: Bango, Fru 6 Asts: Ahmaad Rorie 5

Paul Horn-Arena, Tübingen
Attendance: 1,402
Referees: Benjamin Barth, Armin Mutapcic, Andreas Bohn

23 September 2023
20:00

Boxscore

Karlsruhe Lions	81–93	s.Oliver Würzburg
Scoring by quarter: 17–22, 21–25, 23–22, 20–24
Pts: Bakary Dibba 21; Rebs: Dennis Tunstall 8 Asts: Garai Zeeb 6		Pts: Otis Livingston II 21; Rebs: Javon Bess 9 Asts: Isaiah Washington 3

Lina-Radke-Halle, Karlsruhe
Attendance: 1,500
Referees: Clemens Fritz, Nicolas Brendel, Christian Theis

24 September 2023
15:00

Boxscore

Dresden Titans	85–88	Hamburg Towers
Scoring by quarter: 20–24, 19–29, 27–13, 19–22
Pts: Tanner Graham 19; Rebs: three players 4 Asts: Grayson Murphy 7		Pts: Aleksander Dziewa 19; Rebs: Durham, Dziewa 7 Asts: Al Durham 8

Margon Arena, Dresden
Attendance: 1,831
Referees: Robert Lottermoser, Steve Bittner, Oliver Krause

24 September 2023
15:00

Boxscore

Artland Dragons	67–78	Brose Bamberg
Scoring by quarter: 17–17, 14–21, 14–16, 22–24
Pts: Hundt, Nwabuzor 10; Rebs: Joanic Grüttner 11; Asts: Kilian Binapfl 5		Pts: Zach Copeland 26; Rebs: Nelson, Woodbury 6 Asts: Malik Johnson 4

Artland-Arena, Quakenbrück
Attendance: 3,000
Referees: Anne Panther, Zulfikar Oruzgani, Stefan Fingerling

24 September 2023
17:00

Boxscore

Skyliners Frankfurt	73–81	Mitteldeutscher BC
Scoring by quarter: 28–23, 11–25, 12–11, 22–22
Pts: Booker Coplin 18; Rebs: Cameron Henry 5 Asts: Brenneke, Warnholtz 4		Pts: Diante Baldwin 17; Rebs: Martin Breunig 6 Asts: Baldwin, Stove 4

Fraport Arena, Frankfurt
Attendance: 3,400
Referees: Martin Matip, Johannes Hack, Danjana Rey

== Round of 16 ==
The draw took place on 13 July 2023. The games took place from 12 to 15 October 2023.

12 October 2023
20:00

Boxscore

Rasta Vechta	101–99 (2OT)	BG Göttingen
Scoring by quarter: 16–16, 23–26, 21–16, 25–27, Overtime: 9–9, 7–5
Pts: Tommy Kuhse 37; Rebs: Grünloh, Schwieger 8 Asts: Tommy Kuhse 10		Pts: Kārlis Šiliņš 28; Rebs: Bodie Hume 11; Asts: Umoja Gibson 7

Rasta Dome, Vechta
Attendance: 3,051
Referees: Martin Matip, Moritz Krüper, Radeesh Kattur

14 October 2023
18:30

Boxscore

Niners Chemnitz	89–64	Giessen 46ers
Scoring by quarter: 29–17, 20–13, 18–20, 22–14
Pts: Kaza Kajami-Keane 24; Rebs: Jeff Garrett 8 Asts: Kaza Kajami-Keane 6		Pts: Duane Wilson 15; Rebs: Luis Figge 7 Asts: Simon Krajčovič 3

Chemnitz Arena, Chemnitz
Attendance: 3,471
Referees: Oliver Krause, Steve Bittner, Stefan Fingerling

14 October 2023
18:30

Boxscore

s.Oliver Würzburg	72–76	ratiopharm Ulm
Scoring by quarter: 20–21, 12–23, 19–17, 21–15
Pts: Zac Seljaas 15; Rebs: Zac Seljaas 15; Asts: Javon Bess 5		Pts: L. J. Figueroa 19; Rebs: Trevion Williams 8 Asts: Juan Núñez 8

s.Oliver Arena, Würzburg
Attendance: 2,391
Referees: Christof Madinger, Andreas Bohn, Armin Mutapcic

14 October 2023
20:00

Boxscore

Riesen Ludwigsburg	79–80	Telekom Baskets Bonn
Scoring by quarter: 22–13, 24–21, 16–21, 17–25
Pts: Jayvon Graves 19; Rebs: Yorman Polas Bartolo 7 Asts: Buie, Graves 4		Pts: Glynn Watson Jr. 21; Rebs: Saviom Flagg 8 Asts: Glynn Watson Jr. 8

MHPArena, Ludwigsburg
Attendance: 2,835
Referees: Carsten Straube, Enrico Streit, Christian Theis

15 October 2023
15:30

Boxscore

Hamburg Towers	64–80	Brose Bamberg
Scoring by quarter: 14–22, 20–22, 16–14, 14–22
Pts: Mark Hughes 14; Rebs: Seth Hinrichs 6 Asts: William Christmas 4		Pts: Trey Woodbury 21; Rebs: Filip Stanić 11; Asts: Zach Copeland 4

Edel-optics.de Arena, Hamburg
Attendance: 1,987
Referees: Anne Panther, Zulifkar Oruzgani, Danjana Rey

15 October 2023
15:30

Boxscore

Mitteldeutscher BC	98–95	MLP Academics Heidelberg
Scoring by quarter: 24–22, 26–17, 25–25, 23–30
Pts: Jonathan Stove 21; Rebs: Martin Breunig 8 Asts: Diante Baldwin 6		Pts: Vincent Kesteloot 19; Rebs: Jeffrey Carroll 8 Asts: Isaiah Whaley 6

Stadthalle Weißenfels, Weißenfels
Attendance: 1,500
Referees: Johannes Hack, Nermin Hodzic, Andreas Bohn

15 October 2023
17:00

Boxscore

Bayern Munich	101–73	Baskets Oldenburg
Scoring by quarter: 32–20, 23–15, 25–17, 21–21
Pts: Carsen Edwards 20; Rebs: Serge Ibaka 9 Asts: Sylvain Francisco 5		Pts: Charles Manning Jr. 15; Rebs: Ebuka Izundu 7 Asts: DeWayne Russell 5

BMW Park, Munich
Attendance: 6,367
Referees: Benjamin Barth, Clemens Fritz, Benedikt Loder

15 October 2023
18:30

Boxscore

Alba Berlin	96–71	Löwen Braunschweig
Scoring by quarter: 23–17, 28–17, 25–17, 20–20
Pts: Johannes Thiemann 20; Rebs: Thiemann 6 Asts: Louis Olinde 4		Pts: Jilson Bango 17; Rebs: Bango, Sylla 7 Asts: TJ Crockett 8

Mercedes-Benz Arena, Berlin
Attendance: 6,431
Referees: Robert Lottermoser, Dennis Sirowi, Tamer Arik

== Quarterfinals ==
The draw took place on 15 October 2023. The games took place on 9 and 10 December 2023.

9 December 2023
14:00

Boxscore

Rasta Vechta	87–88	Brose Bamberg
Scoring by quarter: 23–14, 16–28, 17–31, 31–15
Pts: Tommy Kuhse 21; Rebs: Joschka Ferner 5 Asts: Tommy Kuhse 7		Pts: Zach Copeland 33; Rebs: Trey Woodbury 6 Asts: Zach Copeland 5

Rasta Dome, Vechta
Attendance: 3,140
Referees: Anne Panther, Carsten Straube, Clemens Fritz

9 December 2023
16:00

Boxscore

Mitteldeutscher BC	70–85	Alba Berlin
Scoring by quarter: 9–29, 27–16, 16–20, 18–20
Pts: Stephon Jelks 13; Rebs: Martin Breunig 10; Asts: Diante Baldwin 5		Pts: Johannes Thiemann 17; Rebs: Tim Schneider 9 Asts: Matteo Spagnolo 8

Stadthalle Weißenfels, Weißenfels
Attendance: 2,700
Referees: Gentian Cici, Steve Bittner, Nermin Hodzic

9 December 2023
18:30

Boxscore

Niners Chemnitz	78–87	ratiopharm Ulm
Scoring by quarter: 20–22, 19–17, 21–30, 18–18
Pts: Kevin Yebo 23; Rebs: Jeff Garrett 9 Asts: Wesley Van Beck 4		Pts: L. J. Figueroa 19; Rebs: Trevion Williams 16; Asts: Trevion Williams 5

Chemnitz Arena, Chemnitz
Attendance: 4,711
Referees: Robert Lottermoser, Moritz Reiter, Armin Mutapcic

10 December 2023
17:00

Boxscore

Telekom Baskets Bonn	78–86	Bayern Munich
Scoring by quarter: 19–22, 24–25, 15–25, 20–14
Pts: Christian Sengfelder 21; Rebs: Christian Sengfelder 6 Asts: Glynn Watson Jr. 5		Pts: Sylvain Francisco 22; Rebs: Bonga, Booker 8 Asts: Sylvain Francisco 5

Telekom Dome, Bonn
Attendance: 6,000
Referees: Martin Matip, Christof Madinger, Johannes Hack

== Final four ==
The draw took place on 10 December 2023. The games will take place on 17 and 18 February 2024 in Munich.

=== Bracket ===
Semi-finals
17 February
Brose Bamberg	62
Bayern Munich	81
17 February
Alba Berlin	79
ratiopharm Ulm	87

Final
18 February
Bayern Munich	81
ratiopharm Ulm	65

=== Semifinals ===
17 February 2024
14:00

Boxsore

Brose Bamberg	62–81	Bayern Munich
Scoring by quarter: 22–21, 10–27, 9–15, 21–18
Pts: Zach Copeland 19; Rebs: Filip Stanić 9 Asts: Zach Copeland 3		Pts: Serge Ibaka 15; Rebs: Serge Ibaka 9 Asts: Leandro Bolmaro 4

BMW Park, Munich
Attendance: 6,500
Referees: Robert Lottermoser, Moritz Reiter, Carsten Straube

17 February 2024
17:30

Boxscore

Alba Berlin	79–87	ratiopharm Ulm
Scoring by quarter: 18–19, 22–23, 21–17, 18–28
Pts: Procida, Spagnolo 14; Rebs: Bean, Schneider 5 Asts: Matteo Spagnolo 7		Pts: Trevion Williams 25; Rebs: Trevion Williams 12; Asts: De Paula 6

BMW Park, Munich
Attendance: 6,500
Referees: Martin Matip, Anne Panther, Christof Madinger

=== Final ===
18 February 2024
14:00

Boxscore

Bayern Munich	81–65	ratiopharm Ulm
Scoring by quarter: 9–18, 26–10, 24–19, 22–18
Pts: Sylvain Francisco 17; Rebs: Serge Ibaka 7 Asts: Sylvain Francisco 4		Pts: Figueroa, Núñez 17; Rebs: Williams 7 Asts: Juan Núñez 5

BMW Park, Munich
Attendance: 6,500
Referees: Robert Lottermoser, Anne Panther, Moritz Reiter
