= 2023–24 Basketball Bundesliga =

German basketball season

Basketball Bundesliga
- Season: 2023–24
- Dates: 27 September 2023 – 14 June 2024
- Games played: 306
- Teams: 18

Regular season
- Top seed: Bayern Munich
- Season MVP: Otis Livingston II (Würzburg Baskets)
- Relegated: Crailsheim Merlins; Tigers Tübingen

Finals
- Champions: Bayern Munich
- Runners-up: Alba Berlin
- Semi-finalists: Niners Chemnitz; Würzburg Baskets

Statistical leaders
| Points | Otis Livingston II | 20.5 |
| Rebounds | Trevion Williams | 8.9 |
| Assists | DeWayne Russell | 6.3 |

Seasons
- ← 2022–23 2024–25 →

The 2023–24 Basketball Bundesliga, known as the easyCredit BBL for sponsorship reasons, was the 58th season of the Basketball Bundesliga (BBL), the top-tier level of professional club basketball in Germany. It ran from 27 September 2023 to 14 June 2024.

Bayern Munich won their sixth title after a finals win over Alba Berlin.

== Format changes ==
From this season on, the first six teams from the regular season qualified for the playoffs, while the places seven to ten played in a play-in tournament.

== Teams ==
Location of teams in 2023–24 Basketball Bundesliga

=== Team changes ===
| Promoted from 2022–23 ProA | Relegated from 2022–23 Basketball Bundesliga |
|---|---|
| Rasta Vechta; Tigers Tübingen | Skyliners Frankfurt; Medi Bayreuth |

=== Arenas and locations ===
| Team | City | Arena | Capacity |
|---|---|---|---|
| Brose Bamberg | Bamberg | Brose Arena | 6,150 |
| Alba Berlin | Berlin | Uber Arena | 14,500 |
| Telekom Baskets Bonn | Bonn | Telekom Dome | 6,000 |
| Löwen Braunschweig | Braunschweig | Volkswagen Halle | 6,600 |
| Niners Chemnitz | Chemnitz | Chemnitz Arena | 5,200 |
| Crailsheim Merlins | Crailsheim | Arena Hohenlohe | 3,000 |
| BG Göttingen | Göttingen | Sparkassen Arena | 3,447 |
| Hamburg Towers | Hamburg | Edel-optics.de Arena | 3,400 |
| Hamburg Towers | Hamburg | Barclays Arena (1 Game) | 13,000 |
| MLP Academics Heidelberg | Heidelberg | SNP Dome | 5,000 |
| MHP Riesen Ludwigsburg | Ludwigsburg | MHP-Arena | 5,300 |
| Syntainics MBC | Weißenfels | Stadthalle Weißenfels | 3,000 |
| Bayern Munich | Munich | BMW Park | 6,700 |
| EWE Baskets Oldenburg | Oldenburg | Große EWE Arena | 6,069 |
| Rostock Seawolves | Rostock | Stadthalle Rostock | 4,550 |
| Tigers Tübingen | Tübingen | Paul Horn-Arena | 3,132 |
| ratiopharm Ulm | Ulm | ratiopharm arena | 6,000 |
| Rasta Vechta | Vechta | Rasta Dome | 3,140 |
| s.Oliver Würzburg | Würzburg | s.Oliver Arena | 3,140 |

== Regular season ==
=== Standings ===
| Pos | Team | Pld | W | L | PF | PA | PD | PCT | Qualification or relegation |
|---|---|---|---|---|---|---|---|---|---|
| 1 | Bayern Munich | 34 | 28 | 6 | 2989 | 2584 | +405 | .824 | Playoffs |
| 2 | Alba Berlin | 34 | 27 | 7 | 3048 | 2748 | +300 | .794 | Playoffs |
| 3 | Niners Chemnitz | 34 | 26 | 8 | 3019 | 2680 | +339 | .765 | Playoffs |
| 4 | Ratiopharm Ulm | 34 | 24 | 10 | 3076 | 2835 | +241 | .706 (Note: Ulm 175–162 Würzburg) | Playoffs |
| 5 | s.Oliver Würzburg | 34 | 24 | 10 | 2954 | 2724 | +230 | .706 | Playoffs |
| 6 | Rasta Vechta | 34 | 21 | 13 | 3002 | 2801 | +201 | .618 | Playoffs |
| 7 | Telekom Baskets Bonn | 34 | 20 | 14 | 3043 | 2909 | +134 | .588 | Play-in |
| 8 | Riesen Ludwigsburg | 34 | 18 | 16 | 2976 | 2819 | +157 | .529 (Note: Ludwigsburg 189–171 Oldenburg) | Play-in |
| 9 | Baskets Oldenburg | 34 | 18 | 16 | 2914 | 2850 | +64 | .529 | Play-in |
| 10 | Hamburg Towers | 34 | 17 | 17 | 2910 | 2932 | −22 | .500 | Play-in |
| 11 | Brose Bamberg | 34 | 15 | 19 | 3009 | 3054 | −45 | .441 (Note: Bamberg 182–169 Braunschweig) | |
| 12 | Basketball Löwen Braunschweig | 34 | 15 | 19 | 2777 | 2869 | −92 | .441 | |
| 13 | Mitteldeutscher BC | 34 | 11 | 23 | 2908 | 3171 | −263 | .324 | |
| 14 | BG Göttingen | 34 | 10 | 24 | 2900 | 3148 | −248 | .294 | |
| 15 | Rostock Seawolves | 34 | 9 | 25 | 2949 | 3164 | −215 | .265 (Note: Rostock 208–201 Heidelberg) | |
| 16 | MLP Academics Heidelberg | 34 | 9 | 25 | 2817 | 3174 | −357 | .265 | |
| 17 | Crailsheim Merlins (R) | 34 | 8 | 26 | 2762 | 3147 | −385 | .235 | Relegation to ProA |
| 18 | Tigers Tübingen (R) | 34 | 6 | 28 | 2797 | 3241 | −444 | .176 | Relegation to ProA |

Source: BBL
Rules for classification: 1) points; 2) head-to-head points; 3) head-to-head points difference; 4) head-to-head number of points scored.
(R) Relegated

=== Results ===
| Home \ Away | BAM | BER | BON | BRA | CHE | CRA | GOT | HAM | HEI | LUD | MBC | MUN | OLD | ROS | TÜB | ULM | VEC | WUR |
|---|---|---|---|---|---|---|---|---|---|---|---|---|---|---|---|---|---|---|
| Brose Bamberg | — | 97–77 | 79–89 | 92–78 | 84–106 | 97–87 | 85–76 | 86–80 | 98–83 | 90–102 | 108–78 | 81–99 | 83–92 | 93–83 | 97–76 | 76–84 | 94–65 | 78–83 |
| Alba Berlin | 98–92 | — | 90–69 | 92–64 | 101–90 | 110–75 | 108–85 | 85–65 | 96–89 | 100–91 | 75–108 | 59–53 | 85–67 | 91–74 | 112–69 | 98–88 | 98–80 | 90–82 |
| Telekom Baskets Bonn | 88–74 | 87–95 | — | 76–80 | 77–85 | 90–68 | 95–85 | 108–94 | 92–69 | 87–60 | 100–73 | 88–83 | 100–85 | 112–89 | 76–88 | 98–97 | 80–77 | 91–100 |
| Basketball Löwen Braunschweig | 91–90 | 90–81 | 94–102 | — | 81–86 | 98–88 | 110–82 | 70–81 | 83–84 | 83–82 | 88–81 | 83–81 | 91–86 | 76–70 | 87–92 | 72–77 | 79–92 | 100–89 |
| Niners Chemnitz | 109–79 | 79–84 | 80–66 | 82–68 | — | 95–67 | 77–63 | 96–87 | 93–69 | 85–66 | 74–65 | 73–86 | 89–67 | 85–75 | 113–82 | 83–82 | 83–91 | 79–66 |
| Crailsheim Merlins | 82–109 | 83–103 | 98–89 | 70–80 | 82–97 | — | 80–76 | 84–89 | 86–93 | 89–100 | 87–76 | 62–97 | 63–99 | 85–81 | 87–84 | 66–86 | 102–93 | 96–98 |
| BG Göttingen | 92–85 | 77–114 | 77–101 | 75–73 | 100–99 | 110–104 | — | 118–123 | 94–91 | 76–104 | 88–92 | 71–77 | 87–83 | 104–90 | 91–64 | 90–100 | 86–90 | 67–75 |
| Hamburg Towers | 94–90 | 76–84 | 80–87 | 81–72 | 79–85 | 94–88 | 79–66 | — | 79–83 | 89–84 | 107–76 | 80–81 | 80–91 | 105–89 | 94–86 | 78–94 | 85–81 | 58–88 |
| MLP Academics Heidelberg | 90–109 | 81–90 | 92–87 | 76–94 | 77–99 | 90–86 | 109–113 | 73–88 | — | 72–75 | 90–111 | 89–82 | 83–92 | 88–86 | 93–78 | 57–73 | 76–113 | 54–87 |
| Riesen Ludwigsburg | 87–92 | 87–79 | 86–91 | 86–82 | 96–93 | 106–59 | 97–72 | 79–87 | 93–68 | — | 78–81 | 80–85 | 104–80 | 96–77 | 104–94 | 60–94 | 77–74 | 91–94 |
| Mitteldeutscher BC | 86–94 | 67–76 | 92–100 | 77–85 | 95–111 | 98–93 | 97–89 | 81–86 | 104–97 | 91–90 | — | 86–116 | 71–89 | 106–102 | 114–78 | 75–107 | 74–100 | 72–88 |
| Bayern Munich | 91–69 | 77–53 | 90–81 | 91–61 | 89–80 | 98–81 | 86–74 | 90–79 | 83–57 | 92–84 | 96–87 | — | 93–73 | 101–73 | 92–73 | 95–80 | 88–90 | 87–64 |
| Baskets Oldenburg | 107–84 | 85–90 | 83–108 | 87–66 | 58–79 | 80–58 | 106–85 | 107–92 | 99–77 | 91–85 | 95–88 | 77–67 | — | 94–89 | 79–63 | 94–98 | 67–85 | 76–96 |
| Rostock Seawolves | 91–98 | 75–76 | 98–92 | 101–78 | 90–94 | 70–85 | 96–92 | 94–111 | 122–113 | 91–85 | 85–97 | 85–91 | 64–99 | — | 108–103 | 71–96 | 77–92 | 78–91 |
| Tigers Tübingen | 99–92 | 81–97 | 82–92 | 68–81 | 68–106 | 85–96 | 95–116 | 78–93 | 84–94 | 79–98 | 88–78 | 74–96 | 93–84 | 75–92 | — | 84–99 | 77–88 | 101–107 |
| Ratiopharm Ulm | 106–90 | 100–88 | 105–87 | 90–73 | 90–85 | 94–87 | 91–78 | 83–70 | 98–89 | 70–99 | 106–79 | 74–81 | 91–73 | 89–107 | 76–97 | — | 102–106 | 87–79 |
| Rasta Vechta | 101–79 | 89–98 | 84–79 | 97–90 | 80–81 | 96–58 | 81–75 | 79–71 | 109–87 | 72–86 | 98–69 | 81–85 | 82–88 | 85–81 | 103–72 | 86–81 | — | 87–89 |
| s.Oliver Würzburg | 104–65 | 76–75 | 97–78 | 84–76 | 68–70 | 86–80 | 85–60 | 96–76 | 98–84 | 60–78 | 107–83 | 82–90 | 83–78 | 86–95 | 96–81 | 83–88 | 87–75 | — |

Source: BBL
Legend: Blue = home team win; Red = away team win.

== Playoffs ==
=== Play-in tournament ===
Only the top six seeds advanced directly to the playoffs, while the next four seeds participated in a play-in tournament. The 7th-place team hosted the 8th-place team in the double-chance round needing to win one game to advance, with the winner clinching the 7th seed in the playoffs. The 9th-place team hosted the 10th-place team in the elimination round requiring two wins to advance, with the loser being eliminated from the competition. The loser in the double-chance round hosted the elimination-round game-winner, with the winner clinching the 8th seed and the loser being eliminated. The higher seeded teams had homecourt advantage.

Play-in games
7 | Telekom Baskets Bonn | 90
8 | Riesen Ludwigsburg | 69
9 | Baskets Oldenburg | 81
10 | Hamburg Towers | 93

No. 8 seed game
8 | Riesen Ludwigsburg | 91
10 | Hamburg Towers | 78

Final seeds
Telekom Baskets Bonn | No. 7 seed
Riesen Ludwigsburg | No. 8 seed

Bold Game winner

=== Bracket ===
The rounds were played in a best-of-five format.

Quarterfinals
1 | Bayern Munich | 3
8 | Riesen Ludwigsburg | 1
4 | Ratiopharm Ulm | 1
5 | s.Oliver Würzburg | 3
2 | Alba Berlin | 3
7 | Telekom Baskets Bonn | 0
3 | Niners Chemnitz | 3
6 | Rasta Vechta | 1

Semifinals
1 | Bayern Munich | 3
5 | s.Oliver Würzburg | 0
2 | Alba Berlin | 3
3 | Niners Chemnitz | 2

Finals
1 | Bayern Munich | 3
2 | Alba Berlin | 1

== Awards and statistics ==
=== Major award winners ===
The awards were announced in May 2024.

| Award | Player | Club |
|---|---|---|
| Most Valuable Player | (United States) Otis Livingston II | Würzburg Baskets |
| Finals MVP | (United States) Carsen Edwards | Bayern Munich |
| Top Scorer | (United States) Otis Livingston II | Würzburg Baskets |
| Best Offensive Player | (United States) Otis Livingston II | Würzburg Baskets |
| Best Defender | (United States) Javon Bess | BG Göttingen |
| Most Effective Player International | (United States) Otis Livingston II | Würzburg Baskets |
| Most Effective Player National | (Germany) Kevin Yebo | Niners Chemnitz |
| Best German Young Player | (Germany) Johann Grünloh | Rasta Vechta |
| Coach of the Year | (Argentina) Rodrigo Pastore | Niners Chemnitz |

=== Statistical leaders ===
| Category | Player | Club | Average |
|---|---|---|---|
| Points per game | (United States) Otis Livingston II | Würzburg Baskets | 20.5 |
| Rebounds per game | (United States) Trevion Williams | Ratiopharm Ulm | 8.9 |
| Assists per game | (United States) DeWayne Russell | Baskets Oldenburg | 6.3 |
| Steals per game | (Puerto Rico) Jhivvan Jackson | Tigers Tübingen | 1.8 |
| Blocks per game | (United States) Camron Reece | Hamburg Towers | 2.0 |
| Efficiency per game | (United States) Otis Livingston II | Würzburg Baskets | 21.2 |

== German clubs in European competitions ==
| Team | Competition | Result |
|---|---|---|
| Alba Berlin | EuroLeague | Regular season |
| Bayern Munich | EuroLeague | Regular season |
| ratiopharm Ulm | EuroCup | Eighthfinals |
| Hamburg Towers | EuroCup | Regular season |
| Telekom Baskets Bonn | Champions League | Quarterfinals |
| Riesen Ludwigsburg | Champions League | Quarterfinals |
| Baskets Oldenburg | Champions League | Regular season |
| BG Göttingen | Champions League | Qualifying |
| Niners Chemnitz | FIBA Europe Cup | Champion |
| BG Göttingen | FIBA Europe Cup | Second round |
| Rostock Seawolves | FIBA Europe Cup | Regular season |
