= Trevion Williams =

American basketball player (born 2000)

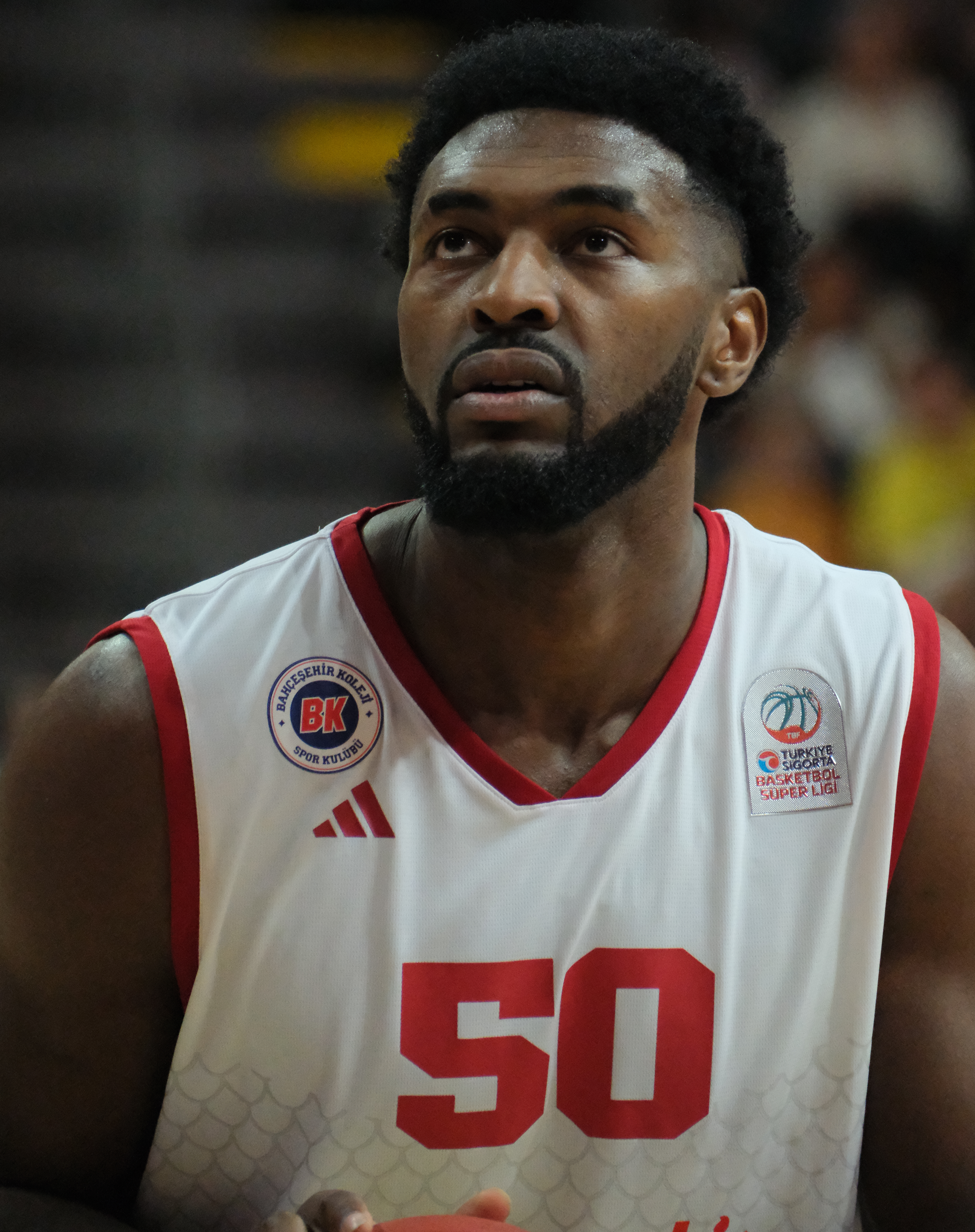
- Williams with Bahçeşehir Koleji in 2026

No. 50 – Bahçeşehir Koleji
- Position: Center
- League: Basketbol Süper Ligi

Personal information
- Born: September 16, 2000 (age 26) Chicago, Illinois, U.S.
- Listed height: 6 ft 9 in (2.06 m)
- Listed weight: 265 lb (120 kg)

Career information
- High school: Mount Carmel (Chicago, Illinois); Henry Ford Academy School for Creative Studies (Detroit, Michigan)
- College: Purdue (2018–2022)
- NBA draft: 2022: undrafted
- Playing career: 2022–present

Career history
- 2022–2023: Santa Cruz Warriors
- 2023: Capital City Go-Go
- 2023–2024: Ratiopharm Ulm
- 2024: Alba Berlin
- 2024–2025: Maccabi Tel Aviv
- 2025–present: Bahçeşehir Koleji

Career highlights
- All-EuroCup First Team (2024); EuroCup rebounding leader (2024); Israeli Cup winner (2025); Turkish Super League rebounding leader (2026); Bundesliga rebounding leader (2024); Big Ten Sixth Man of the Year (2022); First-team All-Big Ten – Coaches (2021); Second-team All-Big Ten – Media (2021); Third-team All-Big Ten – Media, Coaches (2022)
- Stats at NBA.com
- Stats at Basketball Reference
Medals
Men's basketball
Representing the United States
FIBA Under-19 World Cup
Gold medal – first place	2019 Greece	Team

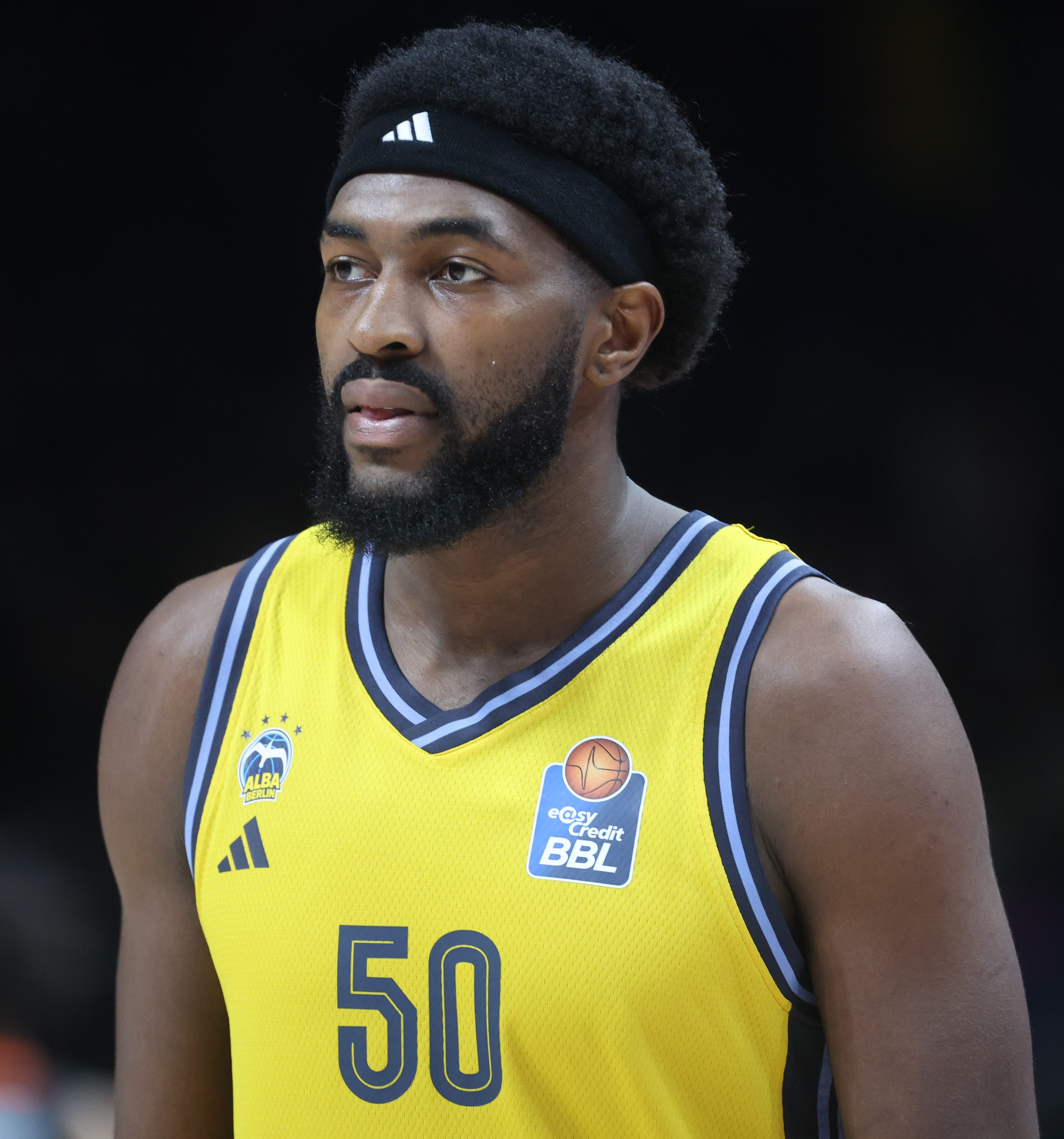
Williams with ALBA Berlin in 2024

Trevion Lamon Williams (born September 16, 2000) is an American professional basketball player for Bahçeşehir Koleji of the Turkish Basketbol Süper Ligi (BSL). Williams played college basketball for the Purdue Boilermakers of the Big Ten Conference.

== Early life ==
Williams grew up in Hyde Park, Chicago and learned how to play basketball from his father, Theodore, who took him to pick-up games at the city parks. When his parents separated during his childhood, he began living with his mother, Shawndra Lewis. As a freshman, Williams played basketball for Mount Carmel High School in Chicago and led the freshman team to a 26–0 record. When he was 15 years old and a sophomore, his uncle, Tyjuan Lewis, was shot and killed. Williams' trauma from the death prompted him to leave Chicago and transfer to the Henry Ford Academy School for Creative Studies in Detroit, Michigan, where his uncle and Lewis' brother was the principal. He joined the Michigan Mustangs Amateur Athletic Union program.

As a junior, Williams averaged 22 points and 25 rebounds per game for Henry Ford Academy, registering five triple-doubles, and was named Michigan Metro Athletic Conference Player of the Year. Williams fractured his left foot at the end of the season. While recovering from the injury, he played limited minutes for The Family at the Nike Elite Youth Basketball League. As a senior, Williams averaged 20 points and 21 rebounds per game, leading his team to the district title. He was a finalist for the Mr. Basketball of Michigan award and earned first-team All-State honors. Williams struggled to control his weight in high school, weighing up to 320 lbs (145 kg) in his final year. He was rated a four-star recruit by ESPN and Rivals and a three-star recruit by 247Sports. He committed to play college basketball for Purdue on July 6, 2017, over offers from Michigan State, Illinois and Xavier, among others.

== College career ==
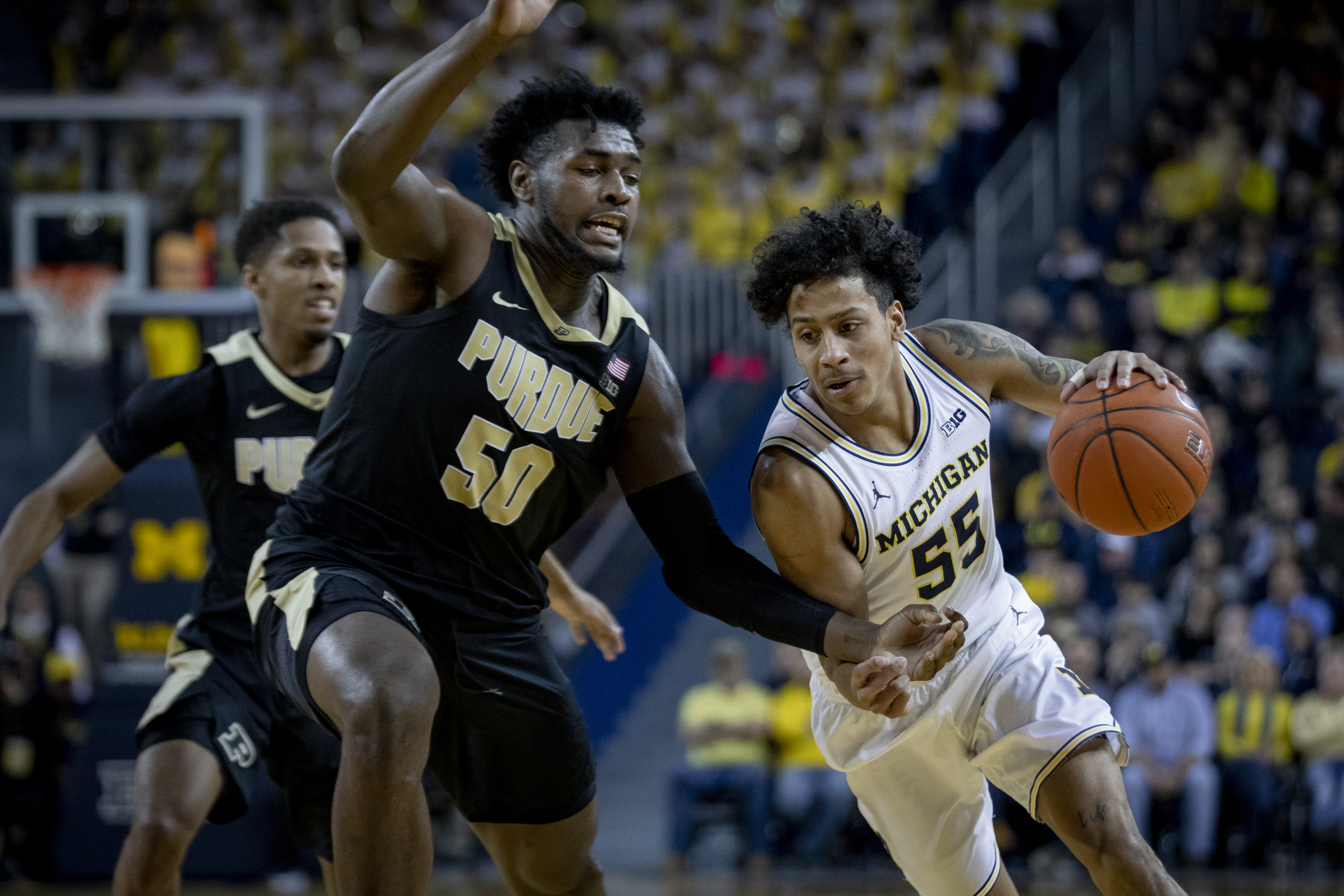
Williams defending against Eli Brooks in January 2020

Williams weighed 325 lb (147 kg) when he arrived at Purdue but lost 50 lb (23 kg) by December of his freshman season. He received limited playing time to start the season and earned more minutes after recording 10 points and four rebounds in nine minutes in a December 15, 2018, loss to Notre Dame. On January 15, 2019, Williams posted 16 points and 13 rebounds in an 89–54 win over Rutgers.

As a freshman, he averaged 5.2 points and four rebounds per game. On January 9, 2020, he recorded 36 points and 20 rebounds, both the best marks of his career, in an 84–78 double overtime loss to Michigan. He became the first Purdue player to post at least 35 points and 20 rebounds in a single game since Bob Ford in 1971. Four days later, Williams was named Big Ten Player of the Week.

As a sophomore, he led his team with 11.5 points and 7.6 rebounds (9th in the conference) per game. Williams grabbed 80 offensive rebounds in league play, which led the Big Ten, and a total of 104 offensive rebounds, the second-most in program history. He was an All-Big Ten Honorable Mention selection.

As a junior, Williams established career highs in all counting stats. He averaged 15.5 points (9th in the conference), 9.1 rebounds (2nd), and 2.3 assists per game while shooting a .525 field goal percentage (4th). Following the conclusion of the season, Williams was named first-team All-Big Ten by the coaches and Second-Team by the media. He declared for the 2021 NBA draft, before withdrawing and returning to Purdue for his senior season.

Williams came off the bench as a senior and was named Big Ten Sixth Man of the Year as well as third-team All-Big Ten.

== Professional career ==
=== Santa Cruz Warriors (2022–2023) ===
On March 31, 2022, Williams declared for the NBA draft and hired an agent. After going undrafted in the 2022 NBA draft, he signed to play for the Boston Celtics during their NBA Summer League. Williams later signed with the Golden State Warriors, but was waived on October 3, 2022, along with Mac McClung.

On October 24, 2022, Williams joined the Santa Cruz Warriors training camp roster.

=== Capital City Go-Go (2023) ===
On January 12, 2023, Williams was traded to the Capital City Go-Go.

=== ratiopharm Ulm (2023–2024) ===
On July 18, 2023, Williams signed with ratiopharm Ulm of the Basketball Bundesliga. He averaged 14.2 points, 9.4 rebounds, 3.3 assists, and 1.2 steals with a 54.8% field goal percentage in 60 games; in his 18 EuroCup games he led the league in rebounds (10.8) per game.

=== Drafted in the NBA G League ===
On June 13, 2024, Williams was drafted by the Valley Suns from the Sioux Falls Skyforce in the 2024 NBA G League expansion draft. The Suns claims to his player rights are valid for two years and would be exercised if he were to return to the G League.

=== Alba Berlin (2024) ===
On July 11, 2024, Williams signed a two-year deal with Alba Berlin of the German Basketball Bundesliga. He averaged 10.8 points, 6.9 rebounds (4th in the league), and 3.1 assists per Euroleague game.

=== Maccabi Tel Aviv (2024–2025) ===
On December 22, 2024, Williams signed a one-and-a-half-year contract with Maccabi Tel Aviv of the Ligat HaAl and the EuroLeague.

=== Bahçeşehir Koleji (2025–present) ===
On July 17, 2025, he signed with Bahçeşehir Koleji of the Turkish Basketbol Süper Ligi (BSL).

== National team career ==
Williams played for the United States at the 2019 FIBA Under-19 Basketball World Cup in Heraklion, Greece. He averaged 8.7 points and 6.6 rebounds per game and helped his team win the gold medal. Williams posted a double-double of 17 points and 12 rebounds in the win against Latvia.

== Career statistics ==
Legend
GP	Games played	GS	Games started	MPG	Minutes per game
FG%	Field goal percentage	3P%	3-point field goal percentage	FT%	Free throw percentage
RPG	Rebounds per game	APG	Assists per game	SPG	Steals per game
BPG	Blocks per game	PPG	Points per game	**Bold**	Career high

=== College ===
Year	Team	GP	GS	MPG	FG%	3P%	FT%	RPG	APG	SPG	BPG	PPG
2018–19	Purdue	34	8	10.3	.542	.333	.514	4.0	.5	.4	.4	5.2
2019–20	Purdue	31	22	21.5	.515	.333	.479	7.6	1.5	.6	.4	11.5
2020–21	Purdue	28	**26**	**25.1**	.525	.000	.500	**9.1**	2.3	.7	.6	**15.5**
2021–22	Purdue	**37**	4	20.1	**.547**	**.357**	**.597**	7.4	**3.0**	**.9**	**.6**	12.0
Career		130	60	18.9	.531	.310	.529	7.0	1.8	.7	.5	10.8

=== Domestic leagues ===
==== Regular season ====
Year	Team	League	GP	MPG	FG%	3P%	FT%	RPG	APG	SPG	BPG	PPG
2022–23	(United States) Santa Cruz	G League	20	23.2	.468	.280	.542	**10.0**	**3.9**	.6	**.8**	9.7
2022–23	(United States) Capital City	G League	25	18.4	**.600**	**.286**	**.714**	7.9	2.2	.6	.3	8.5
2023–24	(Germany) Ratiopharm Ulm	BBL	**34**	**25.4**	.561	.284	.656	8.9	3.0	**1.4**	.5	**14.8**

==== Playoffs ====
Year	Team	League	GP	MPG	FG%	3P%	FT%	RPG	APG	SPG	BPG	PPG
2023	Capital City	G League	2	10.0	.500	.000	.000	3.0	0.5	.0	.0	3.0
2024	Ratiopharm Ulm	BBL	**4**	**22.8**	.500	.167	.714	5.3	1.3	.0	.0	**8.0**

=== EuroCup ===
Year	Team	GP	GS	MPG	FG%	3P%	FT%	RPG	APG	SPG	BPG	PPG
2023–24	Ratiopharm Ulm	18		27.6	.538	.288	.661	10.8	4.4	1.2	.6	14.8

=== U19 World Cup ===
Year	Team	GP	GS	MPG	FG%	3P%	FT%	RPG	APG	SPG	BPG	PPG
2019	U19 USA	7		13.3	.442	.000	.517	6.6	1.7	1.1	.1	8.7
