= Carsen Edwards =

American basketball player (born 1998)

- Edwards with Žalgiris Kaunas in 2026

No. 3 – Žalgiris Kaunas
- Position: Shooting guard / point guard
- League: LKL; EuroLeague

Personal information
- Born: March 12, 1998 (age 28) Houston, Texas, U.S.
- Listed height: 5 ft 11 in (1.80 m)
- Listed weight: 200 lb (91 kg)

Career information
- High school: Atascocita (Atascocita, Texas)
- College: Purdue (2016–2019)
- NBA draft: 2019: 2nd round, 33rd overall pick
- Drafted by: Philadelphia 76ers
- Playing career: 2019–present

Career history
- 2019–2021: Boston Celtics
- 2019–2020: →Maine Red Claws
- 2021–2022: Salt Lake City Stars
- 2022: Detroit Pistons
- 2022–2023: Fenerbahçe
- 2023–2025: Bayern Munich
- 2025–2026: Virtus Bologna
- 2026–present: Žalgiris Kaunas

Career highlights
- All-EuroLeague First Team (2025); EuroLeague Top Scorer (2025); 2× Bundesliga champion (2024, 2025); German Cup winner (2024); Bundesliga Finals MVP (2024); All-Bundesliga First Team (2024); NBA G League scoring champion (2022); Consensus second-team All-American (2019); Second-team All-American – NABC (2018); Third-team All-American – AP, SN (2018); Jerry West Award (2018); 2× First-team All-Big Ten (2018, 2019)
- Stats at NBA.com
- Stats at Basketball Reference
Medals
Men's basketball
Representing United States
FIBA U19 World Cup
Bronze medal – third place	2017 Egypt
Summer Universiade
Silver medal – second place	2017 Taipei	Team

Carsen Cade Edwards (born March 12, 1998) is an American professional basketball player for Žalgiris Kaunas of the Lithuanian Basketball League (LKL) and the EuroLeague. He played college basketball for the Purdue Boilermakers, where he was twice named an All-American.

== Early life ==
Edwards was born in Houston, Texas and attended Atascocita High School. Playing basketball and football as a sophomore, he subsequently focused on basketball. As a junior, he averaged 23.6 points, 4.9 assists and 4.9 rebounds a contest, while being named Player of the Year by the Houston Chronicle. In his senior year, Edwards led Atascocita with averages of 26.3 points, 5.1 assists and 4.9 rebounds per outing, earning MaxPreps All-America Fourth Team and first-team All-State honors.

He was rated as a four-star recruit and ranked #88 in the Class of 2016 by ESPN, Rivals.com, and 247Sports.com.

College recruiting
Name	Hometown	School	Height	Weight	Commit date
Carsen Edwards #16 PG	Humble, TX	Atascocita High School	6 ft 1 in (1.85 m)	200 lb (91 kg)	Nov 8, 2015
Carsen Edwards #16 PG	Recruit ratings: Scout: Rivals: 247Sports: ESPN: (82)				

== College career ==
=== Freshman season (2016–2017) ===
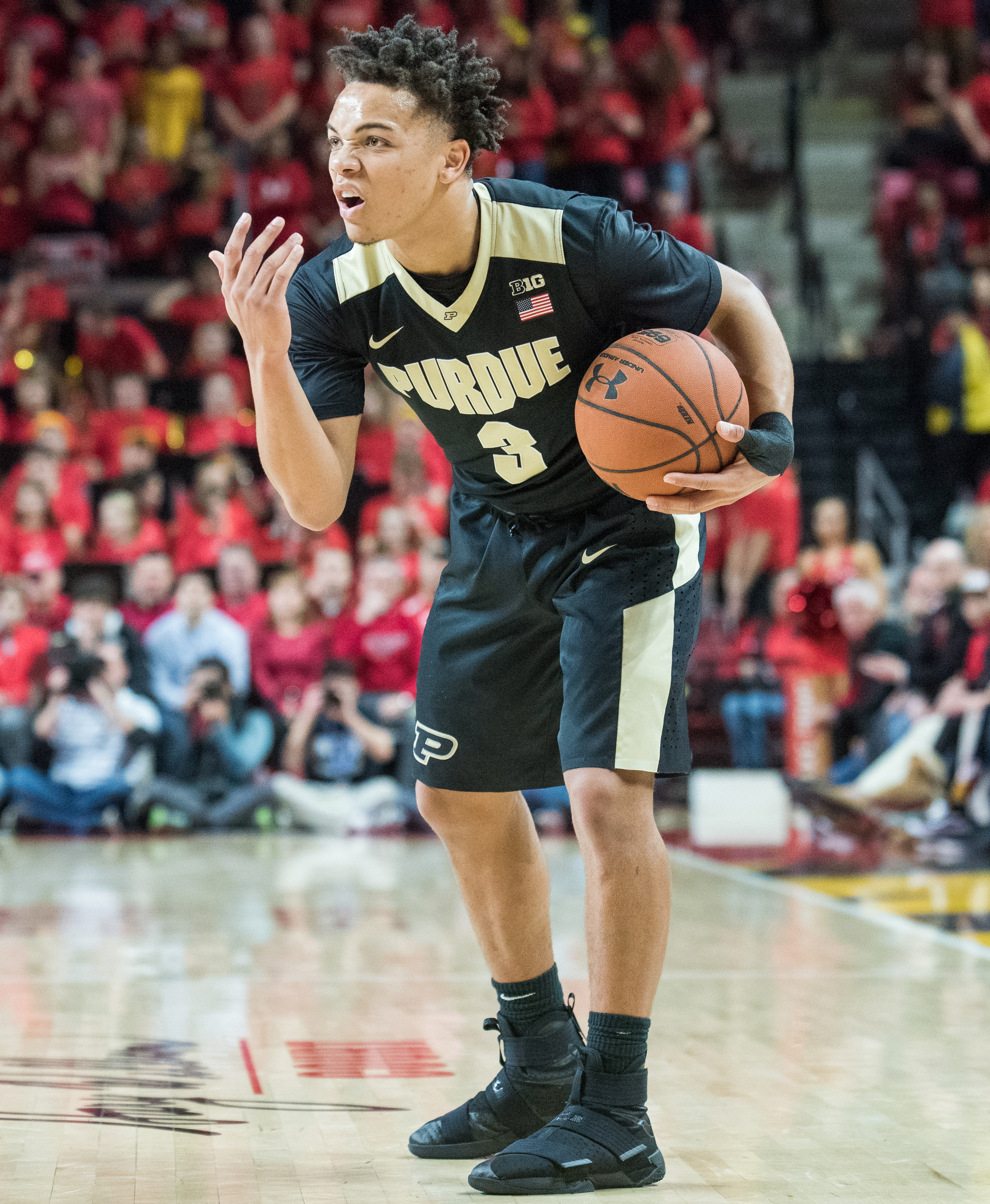
Edwards in 2017

Edwards made an immediate impact as a freshman at Purdue, appearing in all 35 games (21 starts) and averaging 10.3 points as well as 2.6 boards and 1.8 assists a contest. He was the only freshman in the Big Ten Conference to complete the 2016–17 season with at least 45 three-pointers made (49) and 35 steals (36).

=== Sophomore season (2017–2018) ===
Edwards scored a then career-high 40 points, shooting 11 for 19 from the field in a 93–86 win over Illinois on February 22, 2018. As a sophomore, Edwards averaged 18.5 points, 3.8 rebounds and 2.8 assists per game. He was named first-team All-Big Ten and led Purdue to a school-record 30-win season. Edwards also received national recognition, winning the Jerry West Award as the top shooting guard in the nation. At the end of the season he declared for the 2018 NBA draft without hiring an agent. After participating in that year's NBA Draft Combine, he ultimately opted to return to Purdue.

=== Junior season (2018–2019) ===
As a junior, Edwards saw his efficiency dip from 46.8% (40.6% from 3) to 39.4%, and 35.5% from 3. However, he also took about 19 shots per game as opposed to around 13.5 during his sophomore season. This was also due to a shooting slump in February 2019 where he shot around 30% from the floor.

On September 25, 2018, Edwards was named the Blue Ribbon Yearbook Pre-Season College Basketball National Player of the Year. In a 72–68 loss against Texas, Edwards dropped another career-high 40 points on 15 of 26 shooting. On January 31, 2019, Edwards made a then school-record eight three-point shots to go with 38 points in a 99–90 overtime win versus Penn State. Edwards was also named to the All-American Second-Team by the United States Basketball Writer's Association (USBWA).

On March 23, during the NCAA Tournament, Edwards scored a career-high 42 points on just 21 shots in a blowout 87–61 win over the defending champions and #6 seed Villanova. Against Tennessee, Edwards scored 29 points in a Sweet Sixteen win. In the Elite Eight, Edwards dazzled in the national spotlight against Virginia. He made 10 of his 19 three-point attempts, just one shy of the NCAA tournament record, and set a school record. In doing so, Edwards broke his previous record set just the last week with 9 three-pointers against Villanova in the 87–61 round of 32 win, and in making those nine he broke his previous record of 8 against Penn State. He ended up scoring 42 points, his second career high in the last three games, but only scored two in the extra period as Virginia prevailed in overtime. At the end of Purdue's run, he was named the Most Outstanding Player in the South region.

Edwards broke many records in the 2019 NCAA tournament. He broke the single-tournament 3-point record with 28. However, the previous record holder had played in all six games to Edwards' four. He is also all-time 3rd place in most 25-point games in a row in the NCAA tournament, tying current NBA player Stephen Curry with 5.

Following Purdue's loss in the 2019 NCAA men's basketball tournament, Edwards announced his intention to forgo his final season of collegiate eligibility and declare for the 2019 NBA draft, where he was projected to be an early second-round selection.

== National team career ==
Edwards was named to the roster of the US national team for the 2017 FIBA Under-19 Basketball World Cup in Egypt, where they captured a bronze medal.

Edwards was also named to the roster of the US national team for the 2017 Taipei Universiade, where they captured a silver medal.

== Professional career ==
=== Boston Celtics (2019–2021) ===
On June 20, 2019, Edwards was selected with the 33rd overall pick in the 2019 NBA draft by the Boston Celtics after his draft rights were traded by the Philadelphia 76ers. Edwards played for the Celtics during the 2019 NBA Summer League season and averaged a team high 19.4 points, 3.8 rebounds, and 1.4 assists in 23.4 minutes over five games. After clinching the number one seed in the tournament, the Celtics were eliminated in the first round by the eventual champions, the Memphis Grizzlies, despite a 25-point, 8 rebound effort by Edwards. On July 14, 2019, the Celtics announced that they had signed Edwards. On October 23, 2019, Edwards made his debut in NBA, coming off from bench in a 93–107 loss to the Philadelphia 76ers with three points and a rebound. Edwards scored a career high 18 points in a 140–133 win against the Washington Wizards on November 13. Edwards finished with 18 points, four rebounds, three assists, and a steal in 20 minutes.

On February 6, 2020, Edwards was reassigned to the Maine Red Claws, the Celtics G-League affiliate.

He played for the Celtics in the 2021 NBA Summer League. On September 15, 2021, Edwards was traded to the Memphis Grizzlies, but was waived eight days later.

=== Salt Lake City Stars (2021–2022) ===
Edwards was acquired by the Salt Lake City Stars on November 6, 2021. In 31 games, he led the G-League in scoring, averaging 26.7 points, 2.7 rebounds, 4.1 assists and 1.5 steals in 35.9 minutes per game.

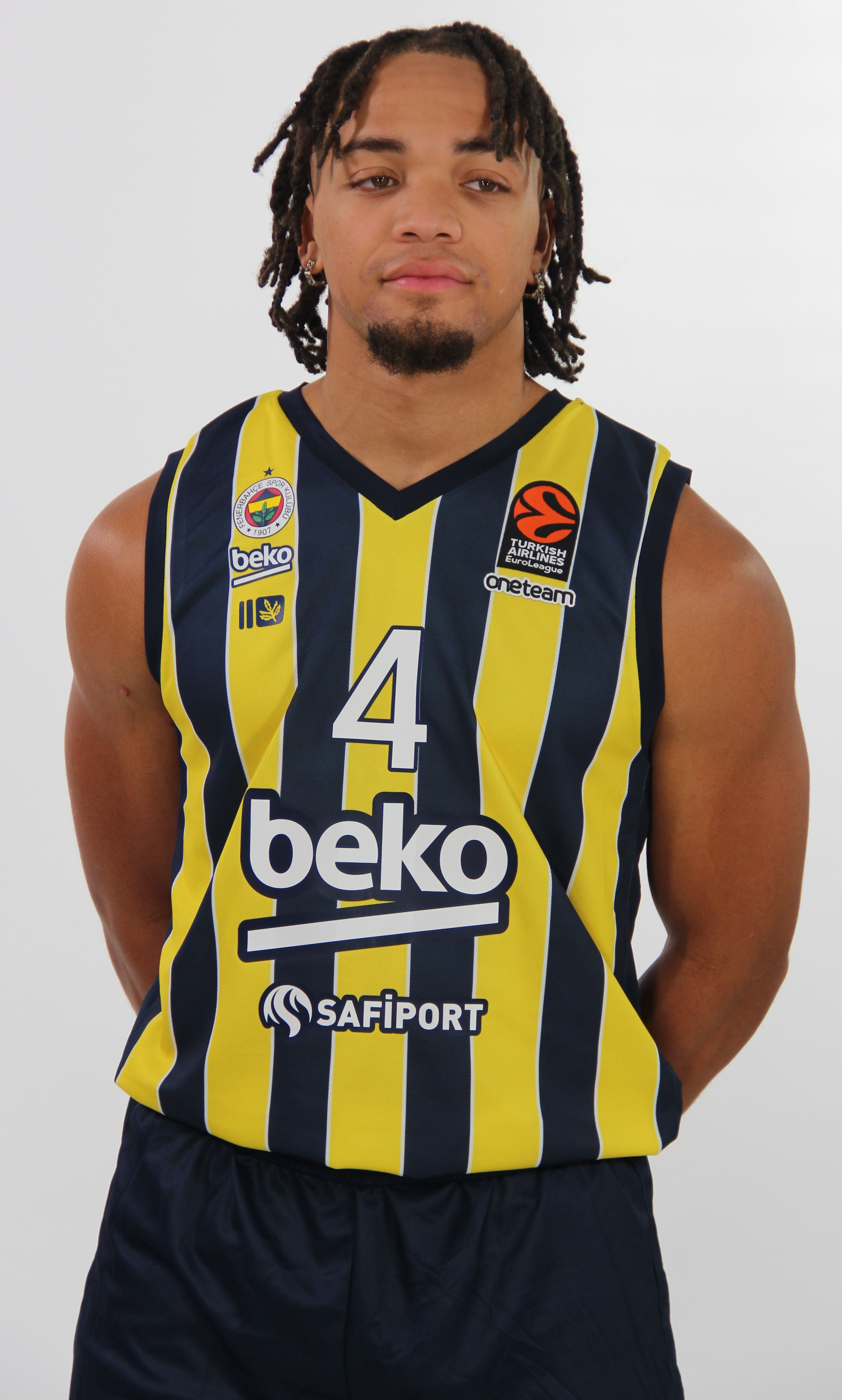
Edwards with Fenerbahçe Beko in 2022

=== Detroit Pistons (2022) ===
On April 3, 2022, Edwards signed a two-year contract with the Detroit Pistons. In his first game with the Pistons, Edwards recorded 13 points, a career-high 9 assists, and 3 rebounds in 31 minutes of play. On June 30, the Pistons declined their team option on Edwards, making him a free agent.

=== Fenerbahçe (2022–2023) ===
On July 31, 2022, Edwards signed his first contract overseas with the Turkish team Fenerbahçe.

=== Bayern Munich (2023–2025) ===
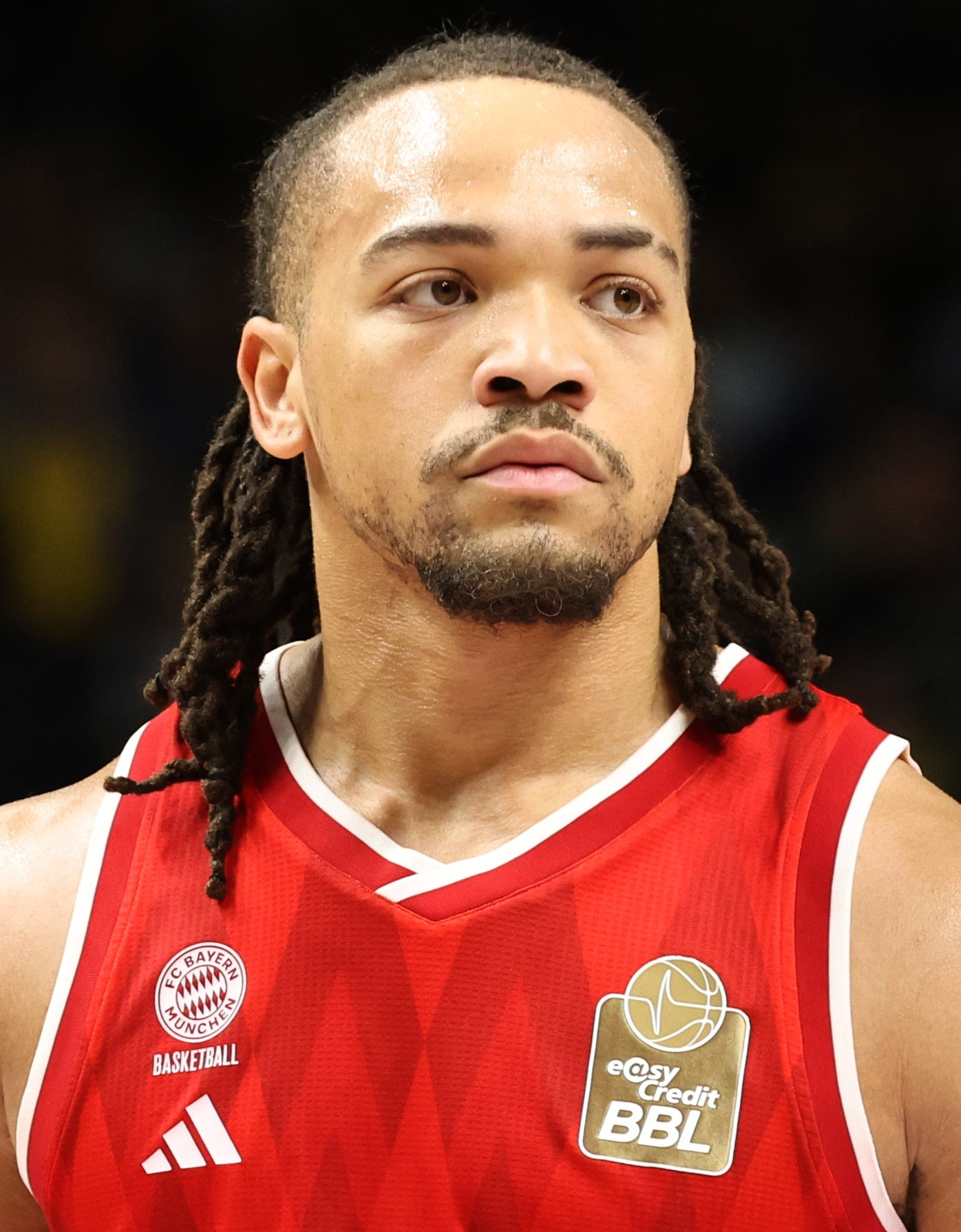
Edwards with Bayern Munich in 2025

On July 21, 2023, Edwards signed a one-year contract with Bayern Munich to play in EuroLeague for a second consecutive season. On June 14, 2024, Munich defeated ALBA Berlin in the finals to win the Basketball Bundesliga championship. Edwards was named Finals MVP.

On April 3, 2025, Edwards broke multiple EuroLeague records in the first quarter of a game against Maccabi Tel Aviv: most three-pointers in one quarter (8) and points in one quarter (26).

=== Virtus Bologna (2025–2026) ===
On July 11, 2025, Edwards finalized a deal with Virtus Bologna of the Italian Lega Basket Serie A (LBA) and the EuroLeague.

=== Žalgiris Kaunas (2026–present) ===
On June 28, 2026, Edwards signed with Žalgiris Kaunas of the Lithuanian Basketball League (LKL) and the EuroLeague.

== Career statistics ==
Legend
GP	Games played	GS	Games started	MPG	Minutes per game
FG%	Field-goal percentage	3P%	3-point field-goal percentage	FT%	Free-throw percentage
RPG	Rebounds per game	APG	Assists per game	SPG	Steals per game
BPG	Blocks per game	PPG	Points per game	PIR	Performance index rating
**Bold**	Career high

=== NBA ===
==== Regular season ====
Year	Team	GP	GS	MPG	FG%	3P%	FT%	RPG	APG	SPG	BPG	PPG
2019–20	Boston	37	0	9.8	.328	**.316**	.684	1.3	.6	.3	**.1**	3.3
2020–21	Boston	31	**1**	8.9	**.441**	.276	.581	.8	.5	.2	.0	4.0
2021–22	Detroit	4	0	**19.8**	.300	.250	**1.000**	**1.5**	**3.5**	**.5**	—	**5.8**
Career		72	1	9.8	.364	.297	.758	1.1	.7	.3	.1	3.7

==== Playoffs ====
Year	Team	GP	GS	MPG	FG%	3P%	FT%	RPG	APG	SPG	BPG	PPG
2020	Boston	1	0	**3.0**	—	—	—	**1.0**	—	—	—	0.0
2021	Boston	**2**	0	2.5	**.667**	**.500**	—	.5	—	—	—	**2.5**
Career		3	0	2.7	.667	.500	—	.7	—	—	—	1.7

=== EuroLeague ===
Year	Team	GP	GS	MPG	FG%	3P%	FT%	RPG	APG	SPG	BPG	PPG	PIR
2022–23	Fenerbahçe	34	2	15.4	.398	.342	.864	1.3	1.1	.6	**.1**	8.0	4.9
2023–24	Bayern Munich	34	30	22.8	.388	.326	**.914**	1.7	1.8	.9	**.1**	11.5	**8.1**
2024–25	Bayern Munich	34	31	**28.6**	**.449**	**.360**	.909	**2.3**	**3.3**	**1.0**	0	**20.5**	14.0
2025–26	Virtus Bologna	**36**	**35**	25.4	.394	.319	.798	2.2	2.3	.9	**.1**	17.3	11.0
Career		139	98	23.5	.411	.338	.868	1.9	2.1	.8	.1	14.4	10.2

=== Domestic leagues ===
Year	Team	League	GP	MPG	FG%	3P%	FT%	RPG	APG	SPG	BPG	PPG
2019–20	(United States) Maine Red Claws	G League	13	34.3	.433	.280	.742	5.1	3.1	1.8	.1	22.1
2021–22	(United States) Salt Lake City Stars	G League	31	35.9	.466	.380	.828	2.6	4.2	1.6	.2	26.7
2022–23	(Turkey) Fenerbahçe	TBSL	20	21.5	.423	.333	.889	2.0	2.0	.9	—	13.2
2023–24	(Germany) Bayern Munich	BBL	41	22.8	.469	.414	.814	2.0	1.9	.9	.1	13.6
2024–25	(Germany) Bayern Munich	BBL	22	24.4	.394	.309	.935	2.3	2.0	.7	.2	14.9
2025–26	(Italy) Virtus Bologna	LBA	25	25.0	.388	.332	.825	2.0	3.4	.8	—	15.3

=== College ===
Year	Team	GP	GS	MPG	FG%	3P%	FT%	RPG	APG	SPG	BPG	PPG
2016–17	Purdue	35	21	23.2	.382	.340	.743	2.6	1.8	1.0	.1	10.3
2017–18	Purdue	**37**	**37**	29.5	**.458**	**.406**	.824	**3.8**	2.8	1.1	.2	18.5
2018–19	Purdue	36	36	**35.4**	.393	.355	**.837**	3.6	**2.9**	**1.3**	**.3**	**24.3**
Career		108	94	29.4	.412	.368	.817	3.4	2.5	1.2	.2	17.8
