= Javon Bess =

American basketball player

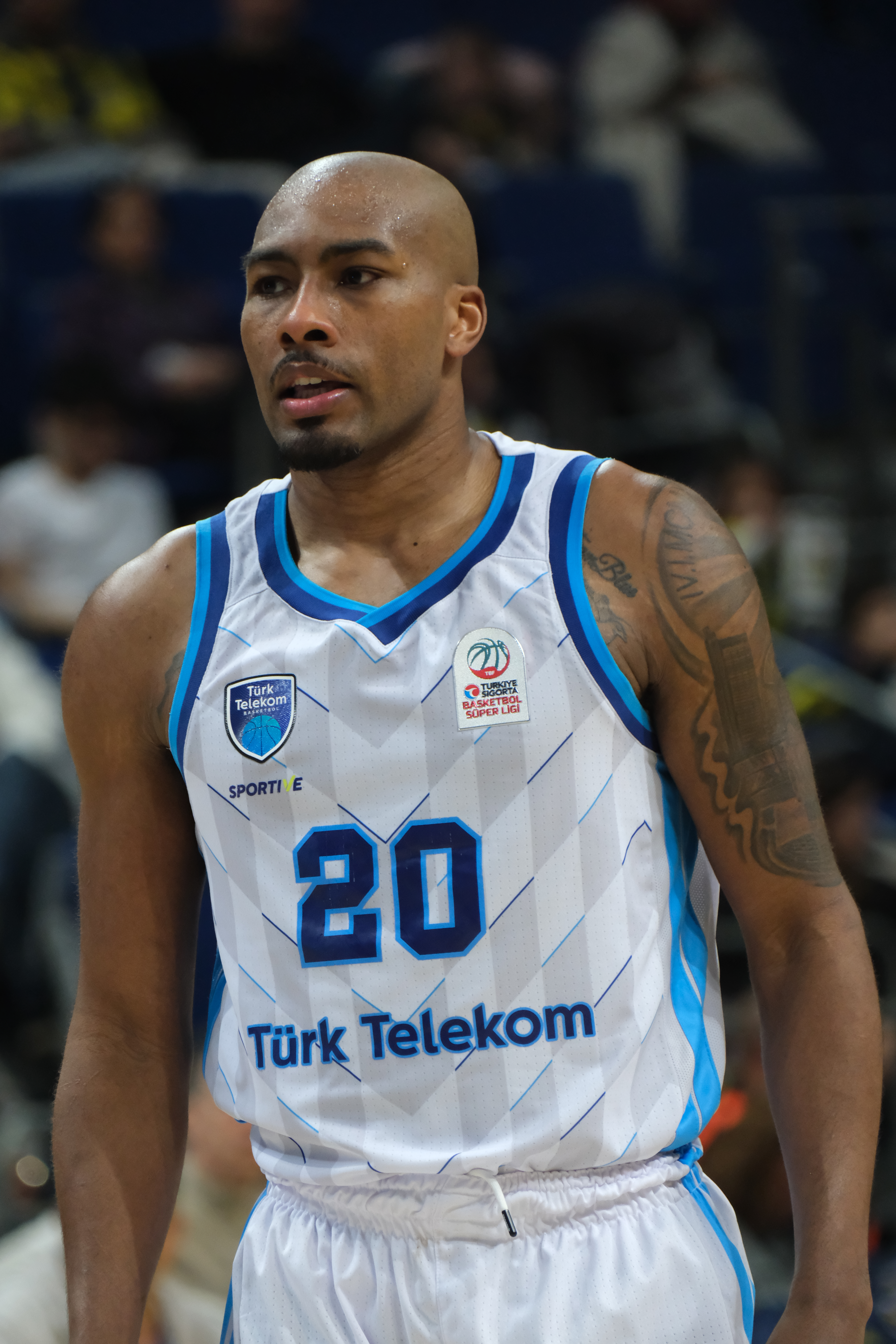
- Bess with Türk Telekom (2025)

No. 20 – U-BT Cluj-Napoca
- Position: Shooting guard / small forward
- League: Liga Națională; ABA League; EuroCup

Personal information
- Born: April 1, 1996 (age 30) Columbus, Ohio, U.S.
- Listed height: 6 ft 6 in (1.98 m)
- Listed weight: 220 lb (100 kg)

Career information
- High school: Pickerington Central (Pickerington, Ohio); Lincoln (Gahanna, Ohio)
- College: Michigan State (2014–2016); Saint Louis (2017–2019)
- NBA draft: 2019: undrafted
- Playing career: 2019–present

Career history
- 2019–2020: Erie BayHawks
- 2021–2022: Tindastóll
- 2022–2023: BG Göttingen
- 2023–2024: Würzburg Baskets
- 2024–2025: Türk Telekom
- 2025–2026: Igokea
- 2026–present: U-BT Cluj-Napoca

Career highlights
- German Bundesliga Best Defender (2024); Atlantic 10 Defensive Player of the Year (2019); Second-team All-Atlantic 10 (2019); 2× Atlantic 10 All-Defensive Team (2018, 2019)
- Stats at Basketball Reference

Javon Anthony Bess (born April 1, 1996) is an American professional basketball player for U-BT Cluj-Napoca of the Romanian Liga Națională and EuroCup. He played college basketball for the Michigan State spartans and Saint Louis Billikens.

== Early life and high school ==
Bess was born in Columbus, Ohio, grew up in Gahanna and moved to the suburb of Pickerington to live with his aunt and uncle when he was in eighth grade because of family issues. He attended Pickerington High School Central and helped the Tigers win the 2012 Ohio High School Athletic Association Division I state basketball title as a sophomore. He moved back to Gahanna at the end of the school year to be with his parents and enrolled at Lincoln High School. As a junior, Bess averaged 18.5 points and 7.5 rebounds and was named second team all-Central District. Rated a three star recruit, Bess committed to play college basketball at Michigan State University over offers from Dayton, Kansas State, UMass and Xavier going into his senior year. As a senior, Bess averaged 22.0 points, 7.5 rebounds and 3.5 assists per game and was named first team All-State and the Ohio Division I Co-Player of the Year.

== College career ==
=== Michigan State ===
Bess began his collegiate career at Michigan State. After missing the first 10 games of his freshman season while recovering from a broken foot, he played in 12 games as a freshman, starting three and averaging 2.7 points and 2.9 rebounds per game. Bess's season ended early after re-breaking his foot. Bess began his sophomore season as a starter for the Spartans but his playing time went down significantly as the season progressed. He finished the year with 2.9 points, 2.3 rebounds and 11 minutes played per game. He announced that he would be leaving the program after the end of the season. He initially committed to transfer to Akron, but de-committed to play at Saint Louis University.

=== Saint Louis ===
Bess sat out his junior season due to NCAA transfer rules. In his first season playing for the Billikens, Bess led the team with 13.3 points per game and total rebounds with 244 (7.8 per game) and was named to the Atlantic 10 Conference All-Defensive team. As a redshirt senior, Bess averaged 15.2 points, 6.8 rebounds, and 1.4 steals per game and was named second team All-Atlantic 10, All-Defense and the Defensive Player of the Year.

== Professional career ==
Bess agreed to sign with the New Orleans Pelicans as an undrafted free agent on June 21, 2019. Bess officially signed an Exhibit 10 contract with the team on September 24, 2019. Bess was released by the Pelicans on October 19, 2019. Following his release, Bess joined the Pelicans' NBA G League affiliate, the Erie BayHawks. On November 17, 2019, Bess had 19 points, three rebounds and one assist in a loss to the Lakeland Magic. He missed four games in November and December 2019 with an ankle injury.

In June 2021, Bess signed with Tindastóll of the Icelandic Úrvalsdeild karla.

On June 15, 2022, he has signed with BG Göttingen of the Basketball Bundesliga.

On June 17, 2024, he signed with Türk Telekom of the Turkish Basketbol Süper Ligi (BSL).

On July 5, 2025, he signed with Igokea m:tel of the Bosnian League and the ABA League.

For the 2026–27 season, he signed with U-BT Cluj-Napoca in Romania.

=== The Basketball Tournament ===
Bess joined Big X, a team composed primarily of former Big Ten players in The Basketball Tournament 2020. He scored 11 points in a 79–74 win over alternate D2 in the first round.
