= Al Durham =

American basketball player (born 1998)

Aljami Durham
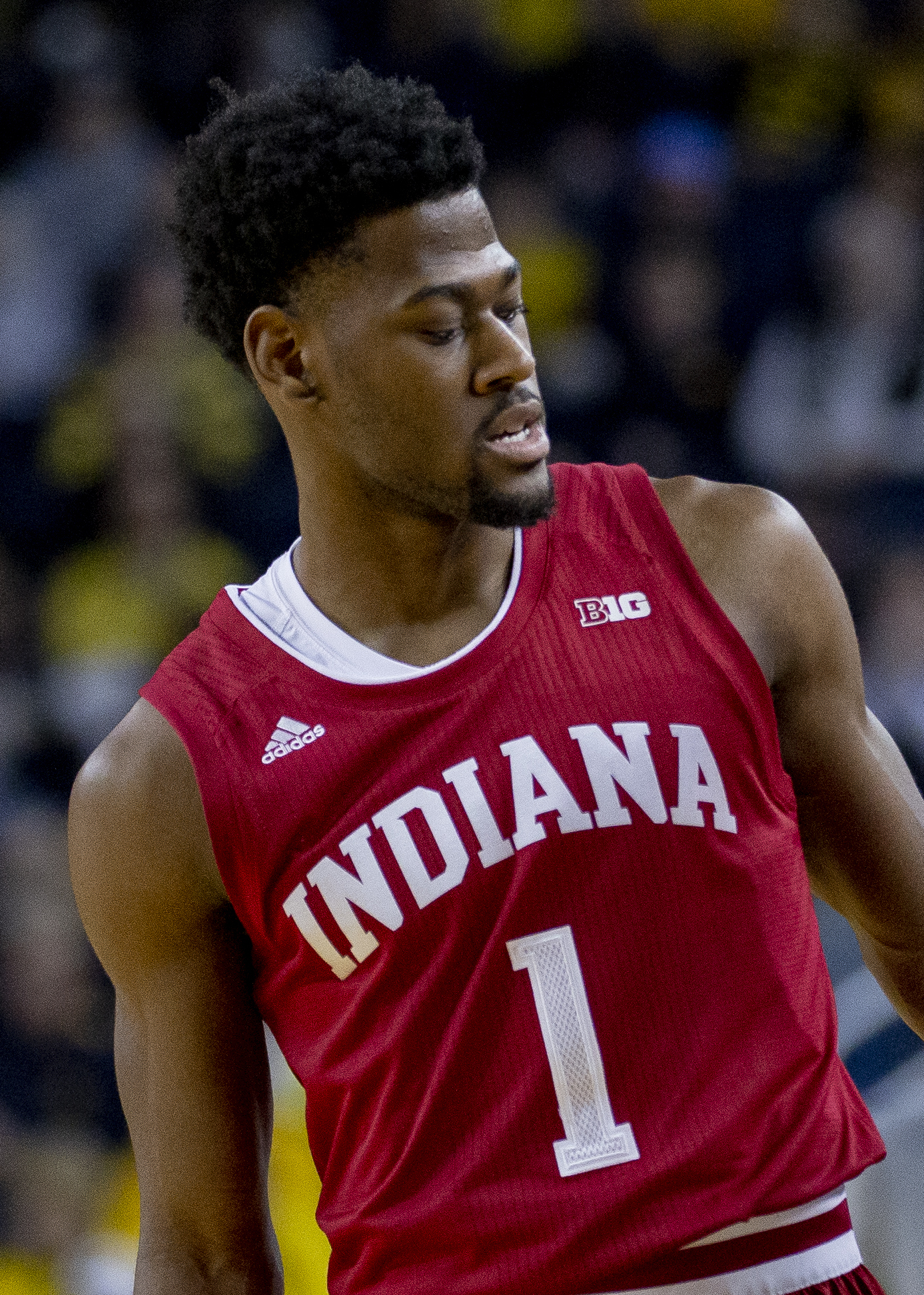
- Durham in action with Indiana

No. 42 – Derthona Basket
- Position: Shooting guard
- League: LBA; EuroCup

Personal information
- Born: September 30, 1998 (age 28) Lilburn, Georgia, U.S.
- Listed height: 6 ft 4 in (1.93 m)
- Listed weight: 180 lb (82 kg)

Career information
- High school: Berkmar (Lilburn, Georgia)
- College: Indiana (2017–2021); Providence (2021–2022)
- NBA draft: 2022: undrafted
- Playing career: 2022–present

Career history
- 2022–2023: Lavrio
- 2023: Caledonia Gladiators
- 2023–2024: Hamburg Towers
- 2024–2025: Bàsquet Girona
- 2025–2026: Vanoli Cremona
- 2026–present: Derthona Basket

Career highlights
- BBL Trophy champion (2023)

Aljami Durham (born September 30, 1998) is an American professional basketball player for Derthona Basket of the Italian Lega Basket Serie A (LBA) and the EuroCup. He played college basketball for the Indiana Hoosiers and the Providence Friars.

== Early life ==
Durham attended Berkmar High School at Lilburn, Georgia.

== College career ==
Durham played for the Indiana Hoosiers from 2017 to 2021. As a sophomore, he averaged 8.3 points and 1.9 rebounds per game, shooting 40 percent from behind the arc. Following the season, he declared for the 2019 NBA draft, before eventually withdrawing. Durham averaged 11.3 points and 3.1 rebounds per game. After four years with Indiana, he transferred to Providence. Durham averaged 13.6 points, 3.4 assists, and 3.4 rebounds per game as a graduate transfer, helping the Friars reach the Sweet 16. He declared for the 2022 NBA draft following the season.

== Professional career ==
On August 15, 2022, Durham started his professional career overseas, signing with Lavrio of the Greek Basket League. He was released from the club in December of the same year.

On July 14, 2023, he signed with Hamburg Towers of the Basketball Bundesliga.

Durham signed for Bàsquet Girona of the Liga ACB on June 15, 2024.

On July 9, 2025, he signed with Vanoli Cremona of the Italian Lega Basket Serie A (LBA).

On July 14, 2026, Durham signed with Derthona Basket of the Italian Lega Basket Serie A (LBA).
