= Desure Buie =

American basketball player (born 1997)

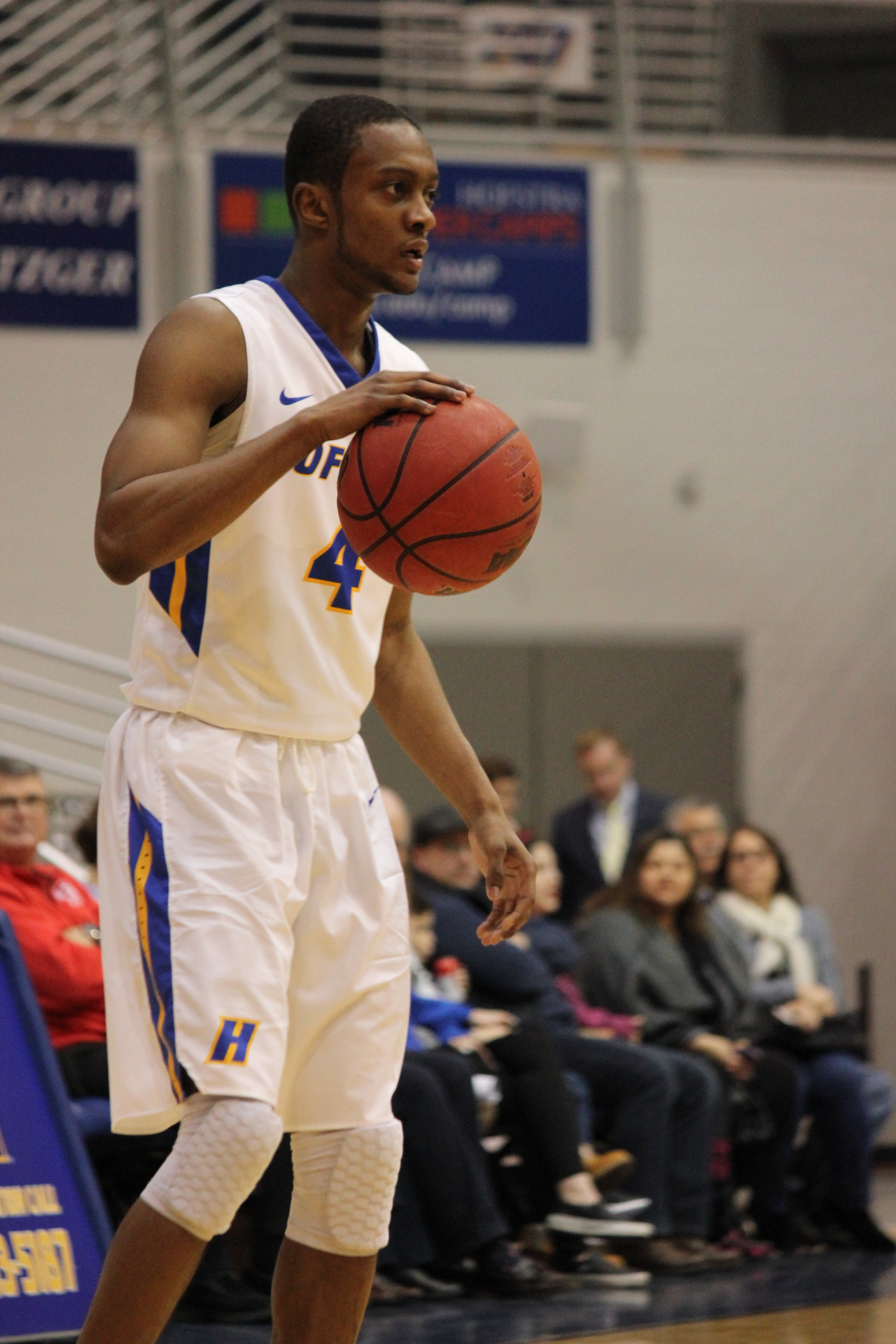
- Buie playing for Hofstra in 2018

Slovan Bratislava
- Position: Point guard
- League: SBL

Personal information
- Born: February 21, 1997 (age 29) The Bronx, NY, U.S.
- Listed height: 5 ft 11 in (1.80 m)
- Listed weight: 160 lb (73 kg)

Career information
- High school: Wings Academy (The Bronx, New York)
- College: Hofstra (2015–2020)
- NBA draft: 2020: undrafted
- Playing career: 2020–present

Career history
- 2020: ZZ Leiden
- 2021: Rio Grande Valley Vipers
- 2021–2022: MBK Lučenec
- 2023–2024: MHP Riesen Ludwigsburg
- 2024–2025: Neptūnas Klaipėda
- 2025–2026: Dinamo Sassari
- 2026–present: Slovan Bratislava

Career highlights
- First-team All-CAA (2020); Third-team All-CAA (2019); CAA tournament MVP (2020); CAA Co-Defensive Player of the Year (2019); Lega Serie A assists leader (2026); MVP SBL 2021–22; Slovak basketball league (SBL) Allstar first team; Slovak Cup champion 2021–22

Desure Tyrone Buie (born February 21, 1997) is an American professional basketball player for Slovan Bratislava of the Slovak Basketball League (SBL). He played college basketball for Hofstra.

== Early life and high school career ==
Buie attended Wings Academy in the Bronx, New York. As a senior, he averaged 17.1 points per game and led New York City in assists. Buie was a New York State Class AA First Team selection and a Daily News and MSG Varsity First Team All-New York City honoree, and he led Wings to the New York City Public Schools Athletic League (PSAL) and State Federation championship. He played AAU basketball alongside future Hofstra teammate Eli Pemberton. He was regarded as a three-star recruit and committed to Hofstra. Buie nearly did not qualify academically for college, having to finish his high school career with strong grades.

== College career ==
As a freshman at Hofstra, Buie averaged 3.0 points, 1.4 assists, and 1.0 rebound per game as a backup point guard. He struggled with his academics, clashing with a writing professor, but ultimately viewed her class as a challenge. He tore his ACL eight games into his sophomore season and was forced to redshirt, averaging 2.8 points, 1.4 rebounds and 2.1 assists per game. As a redshirt sophomore, Buie became the starter halfway into the season, replacing Kenny Wormley, and helped the team finish third in the Colonial Athletic Association (CAA). He finished the season averaging 6.4 points, a team-leading 3.3 assists and 1.5 rebounds per game.

On February 23, 2019, Buie scored eight points and had a career-high 12 assists in a 104–99 overtime loss to James Madison. Buie was named CAA Co-Defensive Player of the Year as a junior alongside teammate Justin Wright-Foreman and helped Hostra win the regular-season championship. He averaged 10.7 points, 5.2 assists, 2.7 rebounds, and 2.3 steals per game, and also earned Third Team All-CAA honors. On January 4, 2020, Buie scored a career-high 44 points in a 102–75 win over Elon, shooting 6-of-8 from behind the three-point arc. As a senior, Buie averaged 18.2 points, 5.9 assists, 3.7 rebounds, and 2.0 steals per game. He helped Hofstra win the CAA regular season and tournament titles and was named tournament MVP, as well as earning First Team All-CAA honors. He was one of 30 finalists for the Senior CLASS award, and was named First Team All-Met. Buie scored 29 points in the CAA championship victory over Northeastern, but the NCAA tournament was cancelled due to the COVID-19 pandemic, forcing Buie to practice in a New York gymnasium. He finished his Hofstra career as the program leader in games played with 141, 18th in scoring (1,310), fourth in assists (548), and sixth in steals (203).

== Professional career ==
=== ZZ Leiden (2020) ===
On July 30, 2020, Buie signed his first professional contract with ZZ Leiden of the Dutch Basketball League (DBL). He played two games for Leiden, averaging 16.5 points, 5 rebounds and 7 assists per game. On October 16, Leiden announced that Buie opted out of his contract. Due to the increasing number of infections of the COVID-19 pandemic in the Netherlands, Buie preferred to return to the United States.

=== Rio Grande Valley Vipers (2021) ===
Buie signed with the Rio Grande Valley Vipers of the NBA G League during the 2020–21 season.

=== BKM Lučenec (2021–2022) ===
Buie signed with the MBK Lučenec of the Nike SBL.

=== Riesen Ludwigsburg (2023–2024) ===
On June 28, 2023, he signed with MHP Riesen Ludwigsburg of the Basketball Bundesliga.

=== Neptūnas Klaipėda (2024–2025) ===
On July 1, 2024, Buie signed one-year deal with Neptūnas Klaipėda of the Lithuanian Basketball League (LKL).

=== Dinamo Sassari (2025–present) ===
On July 13, 2025, Buie signed with Dinamo Sassari of the Lega Basket Serie A (LBA).

== Personal life ==
In 2016, Buie's daughter Jada was born. Buie earned his undergraduate degree in linguistics in 2019 with a 3.32 grade point average, becoming the first member of his family to graduate from college. He received his master's degree in higher education leadership in 2020.
