= Anne Panther =

German FIBA basketball official (born 1982)

Personal information
- Full name: Anne Panther
- Nationality: German
- Born: 18 June 1982 (age 44) Schwerin, Germany

Sport
- Sport: Basketball
- Position: Official
- Turned pro: 2011

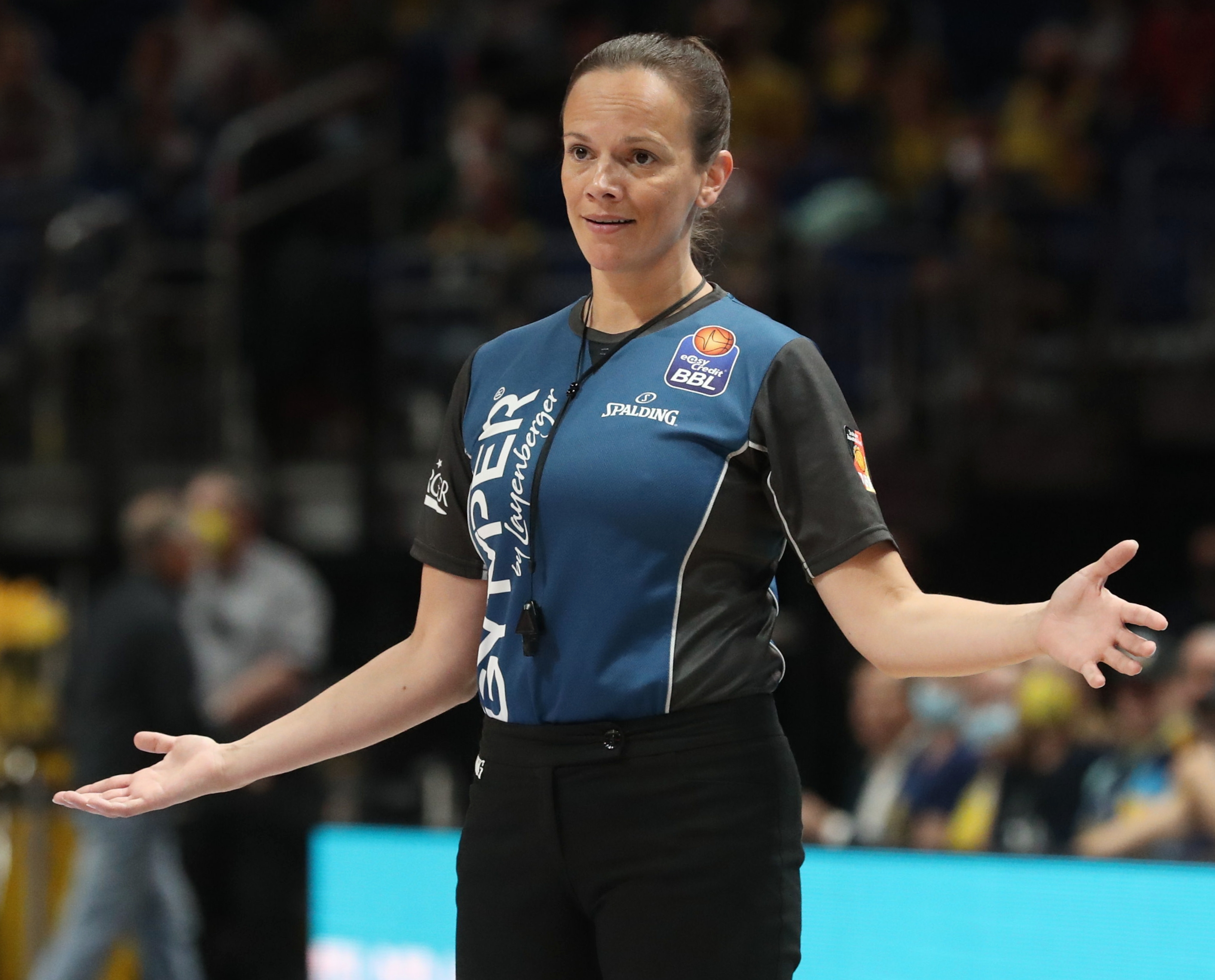

Anne Panther (born 18 June 1982) is a German FIBA basketball official. In 2016 she became the first woman referee to officiate in the EuroLeague and the only one until the addition of Greek referee Vasiliki Tsaroucha in 2019.

== Career ==
She spent eight years refereeing lower category games. At 23 she was appointed for an important tournament in Germany, for young referees. Afterwards, she started refereeing senior games. She spent two years at 5th division until promoted to National Division B. In 2009 she refereed her first First Division match, though she did not become a member of the German First Division referee group until 2011. She got her FIBA license in 2012.

She took part in the 2016 Summer Olympics. Among the games she officiated were the women semifinal Spain vs. Serbia and the women bronze medal game France vs. Serbia.

After the Games she became the first woman referee in the EuroLeague. She officiated at the 2017 EuroCup Finals and in 2019 she also became the first woman to officiate games in the EuroLeague Final Four.

== Years active ==
| Category | Area | Years |
|---|---|---|
| Basketball Bundesliga | Germany | 2011 – Now |
| FIBA | World | 2012 – Now |
| EuroLeague | Europe | 2016 – Now |
