= Tommy Kuhse =

American basketball player (born 1998)

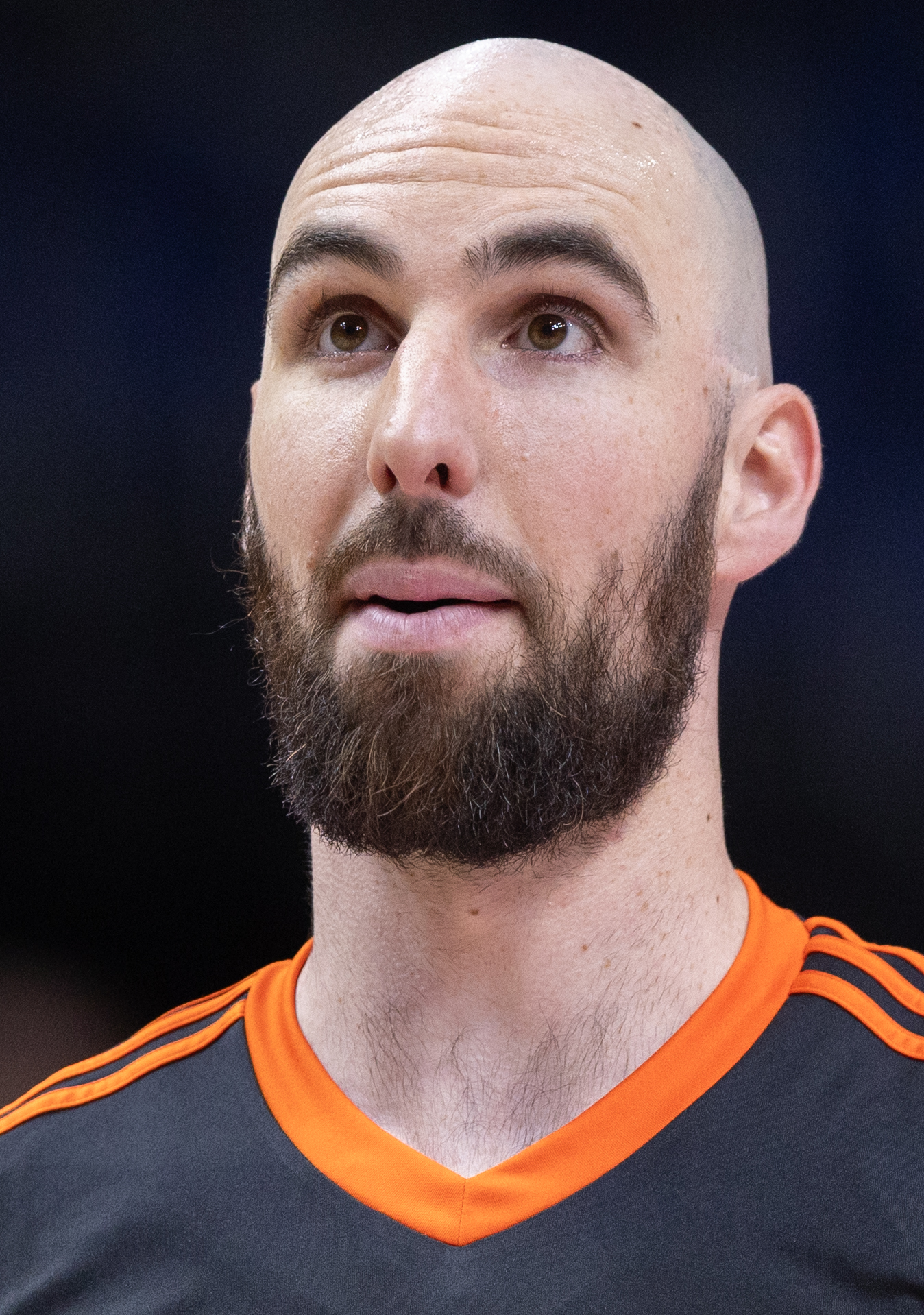
- Kuhse in 2026

No. 12 – Rasta Vechta
- Position: Point guard
- League: Basketball Bundesliga

Personal information
- Born: January 5, 1998 (age 28) Mesa, Arizona, U.S.
- Listed height: 6 ft 2 in (1.88 m)
- Listed weight: 185 lb (84 kg)

Career information
- High school: Mountain View (Mesa, Arizona)
- College: Saint Mary's (2017–2022)
- NBA draft: 2022: undrafted
- Playing career: 2022–present

Career history
- 2022–2023: Austin Spurs
- 2023: Riesen Ludwigsburg
- 2023–2024: Rasta Vechta
- 2024–2025: Derthona Basket
- 2025–present: Rasta Vechta

Career highlights
- WCC Sixth Man of the Year (2022); First-team All-WCC (2022)
- Stats at NBA.com
- Stats at Basketball Reference

Tommy Kuhse (born January 5, 1998) is an American professional basketball player for Rasta Vechta of the Basketball Bundesliga (BBL). He played five seasons of college basketball for the Saint Mary's Gaels before going undrafted in the 2022 NBA draft.

== Early life ==
Kuhse attended Mountain View High School in Mesa, Arizona, where he was a member of the varsity baseball and basketball teams. Kuhse stopped playing baseball after his junior season and shifted his focus entirely to basketball. During his junior and senior seasons, Kuhse was named second-team all-state. As a senior he was named city player of the year after averaging 21 points, 4 assists, 5.3 rebounds and 2 steals per game and leading Mountain View to the state quarterfinals.

Despite his success at Mountain View, Kuhse was lightly recruited coming out of high school. He was unranked as a prospect by major recruiting services such as ESPN, Scout and Rivals, with Verbal Commits listing him as a 2 star out of 5 prospect. Kuhse received offers from small colleges around the Arizona and Southern California areas, though none were scholarship offers from Division I programs. Saint Mary's was one of the few D-I programs showing any interest in Kuhse, and he had a connection to the team's head coach, Randy Bennett, as Kuhse's father and Bennett were high school classmates. Saint Mary's did not have a scholarship available for Kuhse, but allowed him to walk-on to the program.

== College career ==
In his first year with the Gaels, Kuhse was both a walk-on and a redshirt. Consequently, he saw no game action during the 2016–17 season. The Gaels had a crowded, experienced backcourt that season led by junior Emmett Naar and senior Joe Rahon, who along with talented freshman Jordan Ford, left few minutes available at the guard positions.

As a redshirt freshman in 2017–18, Kuhse appeared in 24 of the team's 36 games, averaging 2.3 minutes per contest and totaling just 10 points scored for the season.

As a redshirt sophomore in 2018–19, Kuhse saw his role on the team expand dramatically. He appeared in all 34 of the team's games and was a starter in 27 of them, with his first coming in a December 1 game against Cal. Kuhse would be a regular starter from that point in the season forward, and finished the year with averages of 26.7 minutes, 6.2 points and 2.9 assists per game. Over the course of the season, Kuhse took over the traditional point guard role on the team, which allowed high-scoring combo guard Jordan Ford to play off the ball and focus on scoring rather than running the offense. The Gaels went 22–12 that season, but were 19–8 with Kuhse in the starting lineup. In the WCC tournament championship game against No. 1 ranked Gonzaga, Kuhse played all 40 minutes as the Gaels upset the Zags 60–47 to punch their ticket to the 2019 NCAA Division I men's basketball tournament.

As a redshirt junior in 2019–20, Kuhse once again played the lead point guard role in a backcourt alongside Jordan Ford. Kuhse started 19 of 33 games and averaged 26.5 minutes per game, making him the minutes leader among walk-ons in the country. The Gaels went 26–8 that season and were 23–3 in games in which Kuhse scored.

Prior to his redshirt senior season in 2020–21, Kuhse was put on scholarship for the first time in his career. It was a year of upheaval for the Gaels, who were replacing Jordan Ford and Malik Fitts, the two leading scorers for the team in each of the previous two seasons. Kuhse, no longer a walk-on, became the team's leader. He started all 24 games in the pandemic-shortened season and led the team in minutes at 35.8 per game. Kuhse also shifted from playing a primarily facilitating role into a point guard who was looking to score. Kuhse averaged a career-best 12.8 points per game, second on the team. In a December 15 game against Eastern Washington, he set a career high with 34 points.

Kuhse returned for a graduate year in the 2021–22 season, using the extra year of eligibility given by the NCAA to all athletes who played during the COVID-19 pandemic. Once again, he was the team's primary point guard and started 21 of the team's 34 games. Kuhse began the season in the starting lineup, before moving into a sixth man role from late December through mid-February. Kuhse returned to the starting lineup for the team's final eight games of the season. His 12.2 points per game were second on the team. Over the final eight games of the season, Kuhse played the entire 40 minutes five times. He was named WCC Sixth Man of the Year and earned all-WCC First Team honors at the end of the season.

== Professional career ==
Kuhse went undrafted during the 2022 NBA draft, but within hours of the draft's conclusion Kuhse had agreed to participate on the Orlando Magic's Summer League team. Kuhse played very well for the Magic during the Summer League, averaging 17.3 points per game on 54% shooting from the field and 40% from three point range, along with 3.3 assists and 3 steals per game. His performance earned praise from numerous outlets for his production with the Magic.

On August 26, the San Antonio Spurs signed Kuhse to a contract that allowed him to participate in training camp and fight for a regular season roster spot. He was waived on October 10.

On October 24, 2022, Kuhse joined the Austin Spurs training camp roster. On February 27, 2023, Kuhse was waived by the Austin Spurs.

On March 6, 2023, he signed with MHP Riesen Ludwigsburg of the German Basketball Bundesliga (BBL).

On June 14, 2024, he signed with Derthona Basket of the Italian Lega Basket Serie A (LBA).

=== College statistics ===
Season	Team	League	GP	GS	MPG	FG%	3P%	FT%	RPG	APG	SPG	BPG	PPG
2017–18	Saint Mary's Gaels	West Coast Conference	24	0	2.3	.444	.500	.500	0.3	0.3	0.0	0.0	0.4
2018–19	Saint Mary's Gaels	West Coast Conference	34	27	26.7	.421	.340	.830	2.6	2.9	0.8	0.2	6.2
2019–20	Saint Mary's Gaels	West Coast Conference	33	19	26.5	.376	.321	.686	3.4	3.8	0.7	0.1	5.9
2020–21	Saint Mary's Gaels	West Coast Conference	24	24	35.7	.407	.275	.797	3.7	5.0	1.5	0.2	12.8
2021–22	Saint Mary's Gaels	West Coast Conference	34	21	30.0	.494	.450	.808	3.7	3.7	0.9	0.2	12.2
