= Kevin Yebo =

Ivorian-German basketball player

- Kevin Yebo

No. 10 – Safiport Erokspor
- Position: Power forward
- League: BSL; FIBA Europe Cup

Personal information
- Born: 6 November 1996 (age 30) Bonn, Germany
- Listed height: 2.02 m (6 ft 8 in)
- Listed weight: 209 lb (95 kg)

Career information
- Playing career: 2015–present

Career history
- 2015–2017: VfR Limburg
- 2017–2019: Ehingen Urspring
- 2019–2020: Hamburg Towers
- 2020–2022: Eisbären Bremerhaven
- 2022–2024: Niners Chemnitz
- 2024–2025: Bayern Munich
- 2025–2026: Niners Chemnitz
- 2026: Tenerife
- 2026–present: Esenler Erokspor

Career highlights
- FIBA Europe Cup winner (2024); All-Bundesliga First Team (2024)

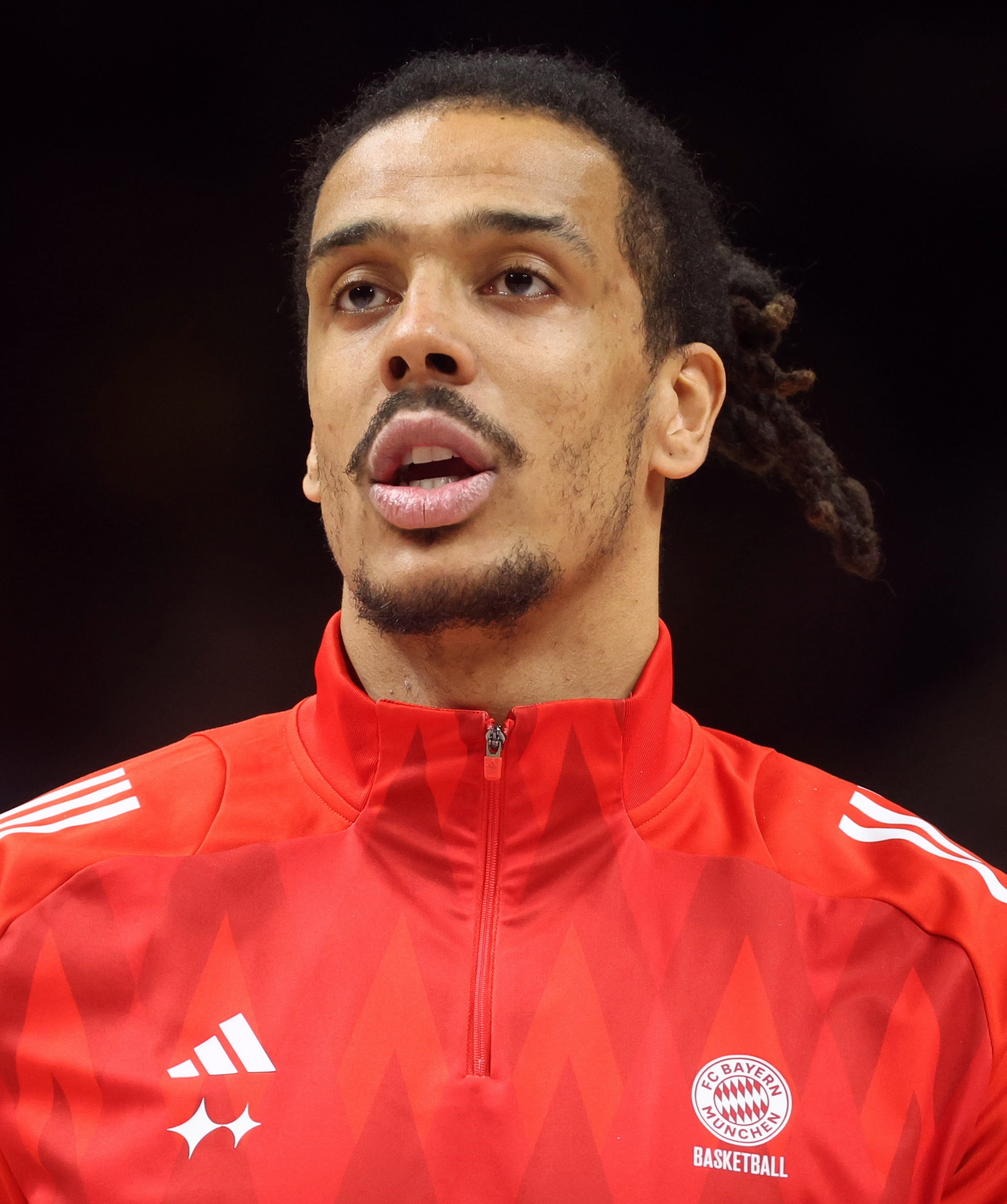
Yebo with Bayern Munich in 2025

Kevin Yebo (born 6 November 1996) is a German-Ivorian professional basketball player for Esenler Erokspor of the Basketbol Süper Ligi (BSL) and the FIBA Europe Cup. He primarily operates as a power forward.

== Professional career ==
Yebo began his professional career in 2015 with VfR Limburg. He then played for Ehingen Urspring during the 2017–18 season. In 2019, he signed with Hamburg Towers and competed in the German ProA league. The following season, he joined Eisbären Bremerhaven in the Basketball Bundesliga (BBL).

In 2022, Yebo moved to Niners Chemnitz, where he was instrumental in their 2024 FIBA Europe Cup championship run. For the 2024–25 season, he played with FC Bayern Munich in the BBL before returning to Niners Chemnitz in 2025.

On May 25, 2026, he signed for La Laguna Tenerife of the Liga ACB.

On July 7, 2026, he signed with Esenler Erokspor of the Basketbol Süper Ligi (BSL).

== International career ==
Although born in Germany, Yebo has expressed his interest to play for the Ivory Coast national team.

== Player profile ==
Yebo is an athletic and physical forward known for his rebounding, transition play, and inside scoring. He is also a reliable defensive presence and adds energy off the bench or as a starter.
