= Rasta Dome =

Sports arena in Vechta, Germany

Coordinates: 52.7332°N 8.2594°E

RASTA Dome
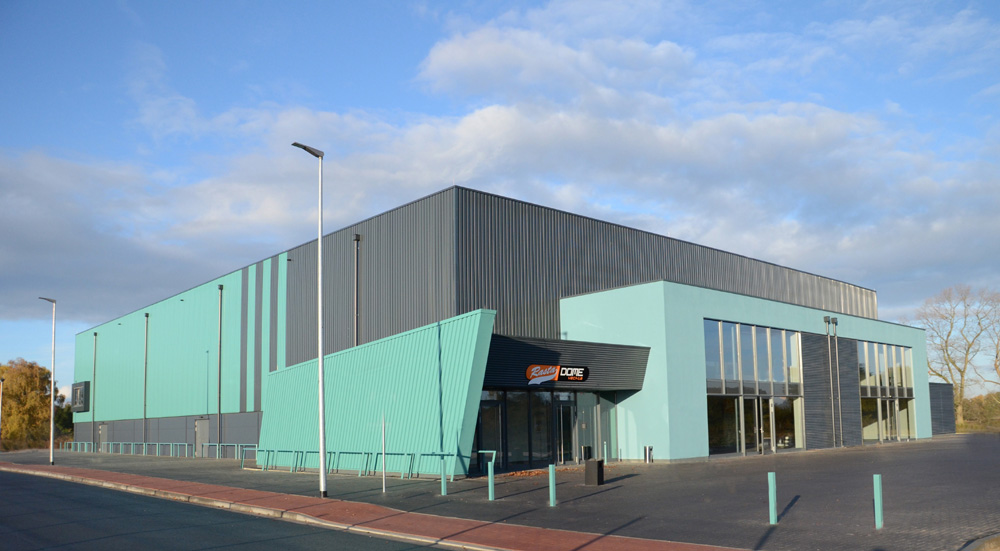
- Interactive map of RASTA Dome
- Location: Vechta, Lower Saxony, Germany
- Capacity: 3,140 (Basketball)

Construction
- Groundbreaking: 14 October 2011
- Opened: 12 October 2012; 13 years ago
- Cost: €3 million
- Architect: Bocklage + Buddelmeyer GmbH

Tenant
- SC Rasta Vechta (BBL) (2012–present)

Rasta Dome, stylized as RASTA Dome, is a sports arena in Vechta, Germany. The arena serves as the home venue of SC Rasta Vechta of the Basketball Bundesliga.

The arena opened on 12 October 2012 and hosted its first event on 13 October 2012. In 2013, the arena, which had an original capacity of 2,000 spectators, was expanded to accommodate 3,140 fans in order to meet minimum size requirements for the Basketball Bundesliga.
