= Johann Grünloh =

German college basketball player

No. 17 – Virginia Cavaliers
- Position: Center
- League: Atlantic Coast Conference

Personal information
- Born: 14 August 2003 (age 23) Cloppenburg, Germany
- Listed height: 7 ft 0 in (2.13 m)
- Listed weight: 238 lb (108 kg)

Career information
- College: Virginia (2025–present)
- Playing career: 2024–present

Career history
- 2024–2025: Rasta Vechta
- 2024–2025: →Rasta Vechta II

Johann Grünloh (born 14 August 2003) is a German college basketball player for the Virginia Cavaliers of the Atlantic Coast Conference (ACC).

== Early career ==
Grünloh played for Rasta Vechta of the Basketball Bundesliga and the club's ProA team, Rasta Vechta II, during the 2024–2025 season. He averaged 8.5 points, 5.5 rebounds, and 1.8 blocks per game over 33 games between the two teams. Grünloh was originally considered a possible second-round prospect from the 2025 NBA Draft, but he opted not to declare.

== College career ==
Grünloh committed to playing college basketball in the United States for Virginia.

== National team career ==
Grünloh was a member of the Germany under-16 national team for the 2021 FIBA U16 European Challengers and also was a member Germany under-18 national team for the 2023 and 2025 FIBA U18 EuroBasket.
