= 2023 BBL Playoffs =

German basketball postseason

Tournament details
- Country: Germany
- Dates: 14 May – 16 June
- Teams: 8

Final positions
- Champions: Ratiopharm Ulm
- Runner-up: Telekom Baskets Bonn
- Semifinalists: Bayern Munich; Riesen Ludwigsburg

The 2023 BBL Playoffs was the concluding postseason of the 2022–23 Basketball Bundesliga season. The playoffs started on 14 May and ended on 16 June 2023.

== Playoff qualifying ==
Seed	Team	Record	Clinched		
Seed	Team	Record	Playoff berth	Seeded team	Top seed
1	Telekom Baskets Bonn	32–2	26 March 2023	8 April 2023	4 May 2023
2	Alba Berlin	31–3	26 March 2023	9 April 2023	
3	Bayern Munich	25–9	10 April 2023	19 April 2023	
4	Baskets Oldenburg	22–12	23 April 2023	2 May 2023	
5	Riesen Ludwigsburg	19–15	26 April 2023		
6	BG Göttingen	19–15	27 April 2023		
7	Ratiopharm Ulm	18–16	5 May 2023		
8	Niners Chemnitz	16–18	7 May 2023		

== Bracket ==
All three rounds of the playoffs were played in a best-of-five format, with the higher seeded team playing the first, third and fifth game at home

Quarterfinals
1	Telekom Baskets Bonn	3
8	Niners Chemnitz	0
4	Baskets Oldenburg	0
5	Riesen Ludwigsburg	3
3	Bayern Munich	3
6	BG Göttingen	0
2	Alba Berlin	1
7	Ratiopharm Ulm	3

Semifinals
1	Telekom Baskets Bonn	3
5	Riesen Ludwigsburg	0
3	Bayern Munich	0
7	Ratiopharm Ulm	3

Finals
1	Telekom Baskets Bonn	1
7	Ratiopharm Ulm	3

All times are local (UTC+2).

== Quarterfinals ==
The quarterfinals will be played in a best of five format from 14 to 26 May 2023.

=== Telekom Baskets Bonn vs Niners Chemnitz ===
17 May 2023
19:00

Boxscore

Telekom Baskets Bonn	94–63	Niners Chemnitz
Scoring by quarter: 22–11, 16–22, 39–15, 17–15
Pts: Sebastian Herrera 24; Rebs: Collin Malcolm 6 Asts: T. J. Shorts 7		Pts: Jonas Richter 14; Rebs: Richter, Weidemann 6 Asts: Nelson Weidemann 6
Bonn leads series, 1–0

Telekom Dome, Bonn
Attendance: 6,000
Referees: Anne Panther, Benjamin Barth, Armin Mutapcic

19 May 2023
20:30

Boxscore

Telekom Baskets Bonn	95–78	Niners Chemnitz
Scoring by quarter: 24–20, 25–20, 22–15, 24–23
Pts: Javontae Hawkins 24; Rebs: Collin Malcolm 5 Asts: T. J. Shorts 9		Pts: Nelson Weidemann 17; Rebs: Uguak, Weidemann 4 Asts: Velička, Weidemann 5
Bonn lead series, 2–0

Telekom Dome, Bonn
Attendance: 6,000
Referees: Moritz Reiter, Carsten Straube, Johannes Hack

22 May 2023
20:30

Boxscore

Niners Chemnitz	83–89	Telekom Baskets Bonn
Scoring by quarter: 25–26, 17–28, 23–19, 18–16
Pts: Nelson Weidemann 19; Rebs: Jonas Richter 9 Asts: Nelson Weidemann 11		Pts: T. J. Shorts 20; Rebs: Collin Malcolm 9 Asts: Malcolm, Shorts 4
Bonn win series, 3–0

Chemnitz Arena, Chemnitz
Referees: Martin Matip, Clemens Fritz, Oliver Krause

=== Alba Berlin vs Ratiopharm Ulm ===
14 May 2023
15:00

Boxscore

Alba Berlin	64–88	Ratiopharm Ulm
Scoring by quarter: 17–19, 27–23, 10–16, 10–30
Pts: Johannes Thiemann 11; Rebs: three players 5 Asts: Maodo Lô 4		Pts: Yago dos Santos 24; Rebs: three players 5 Asts: Juan Núñez 8
Ulm leads series, 1–0

Mercedes-Benz Arena, Berlin
Attendance: 9,134
Referees: Robert Lottermoser, Zulfikar Oruzgani, Oliver Krause

17 May 2023
19:00

Boxscore

Ratiopharm Ulm	77–91	Alba Berlin
Scoring by quarter: 20–21, 27–18, 14–29, 16–23
Pts: Brandon Paul 20; Rebs: Bruno Caboclo 4 Asts: Yago dos Santos 9		Pts: Jaleen Smith 18; Rebs: Louis Olinde 7 Asts: Delow, Lô 4
Series tied, 1–1

Arena Ulm/Neu-Ulm, Ulm
Attendance: 6,000
Referees: Christof Madinger, Clemens Fritz, Johannes Hack

19 May 2023
19:00

Boxscore

Alba Berlin	81–93	Ratiopharm Ulm
Scoring by quarter: 27–20, 19–33, 23–22, 12–18
Pts: Jaleen Smith 17; Rebs: Jaleen Smith 7 Asts: Tamir Blatt 5		Pts: Bruno Caboclo 22; Rebs: Bruno Caboclo 6 Asts: Juan Núñez 8
Ulm leads series, 2–1

Mercedes-Benz Arena, Berlin
Attendance: 10,843
Referees: Gentian Cici, Steve Bittner, Armin Mutapcic

24 May 2023
20:30

Boxscore

Ratiopharm Ulm	83–81	Alba Berlin
Scoring by quarter: 26–22, 24–29, 18–16, 15–14
Pts: Yago dos Santos 16; Rebs: Juan Núñez 6 Asts: Juan Núñez 6		Pts: Jaleen Smith 18; Rebs: Johannes Thiemann 8 Asts: Blatt, Smith 4
Ulm wins series, 3–1

Arena Ulm/Neu-Ulm, Ulm
Attendance: 6,000
Referees: Anne Panther, Moritz Reiter, Benjamin Barth

=== Bayern Munich vs BG Göttingen ===
16 May 2023
20:30

Boxscore

Bayern Munich	87–67	BG Göttingen
Scoring by quarter: 21–14, 23–22, 22–14, 21–17
Pts: Nick Weiler-Babb 15; Rebs: Zylan Cheatham 9 Asts: Andreas Obst 5		Pts: Mark Smith 16; Rebs: three players 5 Asts: Geno Crandall 6
Bayern Munich leads series, 1–0

Audi Dome, Munich
Attendance: 6,059
Referees: Moritz Reiter, Carsten Straube, Steve Bittner

18 May 2023
18:00

Boxscore

Bayern Munich	87–85	BG Göttingen
Scoring by quarter: 24–23, 31–20, 14–23, 18–19
Pts: Cassius Winston 13; Rebs: Freddie Gillespie 6 Asts: Weiler-Babb, Winston 4		Pts: Geno Crandall 28; Rebs: Till Pape 5 Asts: Javon Bess 5
Bayern Munich leads series, 2–0

Audi Dome, Munich
Attendance: 6,500
Referees: Robert Lottermoser, Nesa Kovacevic, Moritz Krüper

21 May 2023
15:00

Boxscore

BG Göttingen	54–65	Bayern Munich
Scoring by quarter: 14–17, 23–19, 7–17, 10–12
Pts: Till Pape 17; Rebs: Rayshaun Hammonds 10; Asts: Geno Crandall 7		Pts: Cassius Winston 16; Rebs: Zylan Cheatham 11; Asts: Nick Weiler-Babb 3
Bayern Munich wins series, 3–0

Sparkassen Arena, Göttingen
Attendance: 3,447
Referees: Gentian Cici, Zulfikar Oruzgani, Benjamin Barth

=== Baskets Oldenburg vs Riesen Ludwigsburg ===
16 May 2023
19:00

Boxscore

Baskets Oldenburg	80–90	Riesen Ludwigsburg
Scoring by quarter: 25–30, 20–26, 23–15, 12–19
Pts: DeWayne Russell 31; Rebs: Trey Drechsel 9 Asts: DeWayne Russell 5		Pts: Yorman Polas Bartolo 24; Rebs: Bähre, Polas Bartolo 6 Asts: Prentiss Hubb 10
Ludwigsburg leads series, 1–0

Große EWE Arena, Oldenburg
Attendance: 6,200
Referees: Martin Matip, Nesa Kovacevic, Moritz Krüper

18 May 2023
15:00

Boxscore

Baskets Oldenburg	72–73	Riesen Ludwigsburg
Scoring by quarter: 14–18, 17–17, 24–24, 17–14
Pts: T. J. Holyfield 15; Rebs: Trey Drechsel 7 Asts: Gravett, Russell 4		Pts: Polas Bartolo, Waardenburg 13; Rebs: Yorman Polas Bartolo 10; Asts: Cherry, Hubb 4
Ludwigsburg leads series, 2–0

Große EWE Arena, Oldenburg
Attendance: 6,200
Referees: Gentian Cici, Carsten Straube, Zulfikar Oruzgani

21 May 2023
18:00

Boxscore

Riesen Ludwigsburg	86–62	Baskets Oldenburg
Scoring by quarter: 25–23, 15–14, 26–18, 20–17
Pts: Cherry, Miller 17; Rebs: Shonn Miller 6 Asts: Prentiss Hubb 7		Pts: DeWayne Russell 27; Rebs: three players 6 Asts: DeWayne Russell 5
Ludwigsburg wins series, 3–0

Arena Ludwigsburg, Ludwigsburg
Attendance: 4,000
Referees: Moritz Reiter, Christof Madinger, Armin Mutapcic

== Semifinals ==
The semifinals will be played in a best of five format from 28 May to 7 June 2023.

=== Telekom Baskets Bonn vs Riesen Ludwigsburg ===
29 May 2023
19:00

Boxscore

Telekom Baskets Bonn	80–71	Riesen Ludwigsburg
Scoring by quarter: 16–23, 26–8, 14–22, 24–18
Pts: T. J. Shorts 22; Rebs: Collin Malcolm 10; Asts: T. J. Shorts 7		Pts: Yorman Polas Bartolo 12; Rebs: Hubb, Miller 7 Asts: Will Cherry 7
Bonn leads series, 1–0

Telekom Dome, Bonn
Attendance: 6,000
Referees: Martin Matip, Christof Madinger, Moritz Krüper

31 May 2023
20:30

Boxscore

Telekom Baskets Bonn	94–65	Riesen Ludwigsburg
Scoring by quarter: 27–21, 17–15, 24–13, 26–16
Pts: Jeremy Morgan 23; Rebs: Leon Kratzer 9 Asts: T. J. Shorts 6		Pts: Shonn Miller 11; Rebs: Sam Waardenburg 8 Asts: Cherry, Kuhse 3
Bonn leads series, 2–0

Telekom Dome, Bonn
Attendance: 6,000
Referees: Anne Panther, Carsten Straube, Armin Mutapcic

3 June 2023
20:30

Boxscore

Riesen Ludwigsburg	73–82	Telekom Baskets Bonn
Scoring by quarter: 17–18, 18–18, 16–21, 22–25
Pts: Prentiss Hubb 18; Rebs: Shonn Miller 8 Asts: Prentiss Hubb 3		Pts: T. J. Shorts 20; Rebs: Kratzer, Ward 9 Asts: Delany 5
Bonn wins series, 3–0

Arena Ludwigsburg, Ludwigsburg
Attendance: 4,000
Referees: Gentian Cici, Moritz Reiter, Benjamin Barth

=== Bayern Munich vs Ratiopharm Ulm ===
28 May 2023
18:00

Boxscore

Bayern Munich	69–87	Ratiopharm Ulm
Scoring by quarter: 20–18, 21–24, 17–23, 11–22
Pts: Cassius Winston 13; Rebs: Zylan Cheatham 6 Asts: Cassius Winston 7		Pts: Juan Núñez 19; Rebs: Bruno Caboclo 12; Asts: Yago dos Santos 5
Ulm leads series, 1–0

Audi Dome, Munich
Attendance: 6,117
Referees: Moritz Reiter, Benjamin Barth, Oliver Krause

30 May 2023
20:30

Boxscore

Bayern Munich	88–93	Ratiopharm Ulm
Scoring by quarter: 20–27, 19–17, 17–27, 32–22
Pts: Andreas Obst 34; Rebs: Nick Weiler-Babb 7 Asts: D. J. Seeley 3		Pts: Yago dos Santos 21; Rebs: Bruno Caboclo 7 Asts: dos Santos, Klepeisz 5
Ulm leads series, 2–0

Audi Dome, Munich
Attendance: 6,500
Referees: Gentian Cici, Clemens Fritz, Steve Bittner

2 June 2023
19:00

Boxscore

Ratiopharm Ulm	104–102 (OT)	Bayern Munich
Scoring by quarter: 29–22, 17–21, 28–19, 18–30, Overtime: 12–10
Pts: Bruno Caboclo 22; Rebs: Juan Núñez 9 Asts: Yago dos Santos 7		Pts: Cassius Winston 22; Rebs: Nick Weiler-Babb 8 Asts: Andreas Obst 5
Ulm wins series, 3–0

Arena Ulm/Neu-Ulm, Ulm
Attendance: 6,000
Referees: Anne Panther, Christof Madinger, Armin Mutapcic

== Final ==
The final was played in a best of five format from 9 to 16 June 2023.

9 June 2023
20:30

Boxscore

Telekom Baskets Bonn	73–79	Ratiopharm Ulm
Scoring by quarter: 20–20, 15–22, 17–13, 21–24
Pts: T. J. Shorts 20; Rebs: Tyson Ward 8 Asts: T. J. Shorts 7		Pts: Yago dos Santos 19; Rebs: Josh Hawley 9 Asts: Yago dos Santos 9
Ulm leads series, 1–0

Telekom Dome, Bonn
Attendance: 6,000
Referees: Gentian Cici, Carsten Straube, Steve Bittner

11 June 2023
18:00

Boxscore

Telekom Baskets Bonn	104–75	Ratiopharm Ulm
Scoring by quarter: 26–16, 19–13, 30–15, 29–31
Pts: Delany 23; Rebs: Tyson Ward 8 Asts: T. J. Shorts 9		Pts: Karim Jallow 17; Rebs: five players 3 Asts: Brandon Paul 7
Series tied, 1–1

Telekom Dome, Bonn
Attendance: 6,000
Referees: Anne Panther, Martin Matip, Oliver Krause

14 June 2023
20:30

Boxscore

Ratiopharm Ulm	112–84	Telekom Baskets Bonn
Scoring by quarter: 26–18, 27–12, 27–25, 32–29
Pts: Karim Jallow 24; Rebs: Josh Hawley 10; Asts: Yago dos Santos 8		Pts: Tyson Ward 24; Rebs: Tyson Ward 9 Asts: Herrera, Shorts 5
Ulm leads series, 2–1

Arena Ulm/Neu-Ulm, Ulm
Attendance: 6,000
Referees: Moritz Reiter, Christof Madinger, Benjamin Barth

16 June 2023
20:30

Boxscore

Ratiopharm Ulm	74–70	Telekom Baskets Bonn
Scoring by quarter: 21–23, 22–18, 8–18, 23–11
Pts: Yago dos Santos 25; Rebs: Josh Hawley 9 Asts: Yago dos Santos 8		Pts: T. J. Shorts 19; Rebs: Kratzer, Shorts 8 Asts: T. J. Shorts 6
Ulm wins series, 3–1

Arena Ulm/Neu-Ulm, Ulm
Attendance: 6,000
Referees: Anne Panther, Martin Matip, Gentian Cici
