= 2022–23 ACB season =

Spanish basketball league season

Liga Endesa^{1}
- Season: 2022–23
- Games played: 325
- Teams: 18

Regular season
- Season MVP: (Georgia (country)) Giorgi Shermadini
- Relegated: Real Betis Baloncesto; Carplus Fuenlabrada

Finals
- Champions: Barça; 17th ACB title 20th Spanish title
- Runners-up: Real Madrid
- Semi-finalists: Unicaja; Joventut
- Finals MVP: (Spain) Nikola Mirotić

Statistical leaders
| Points | (Canada) Kassius Robertson | 17.4 |
| Rebounds | (United States) Ethan Happ | 7.9 |
| Assists | (Serbia) Jovan Novak | 7.6 |
| Index Rating | (Cape Verde) Edy Tavares | 18.5 |

Records
- Biggest home win: Unicaja 106–60 Real Betis (30 October 2022)
- Biggest away win: Manresa 70–106 Breogán (29 October 2022)
- Highest scoring: Breogán 114–115 Real Betis (4 March 2023)
- Winning streak: 11 games Barça
- Losing streak: 19 games Fuenlabrada
- Highest attendance: 15,501; Baskonia 103–89 Unicaja (30 September 2022)
- Lowest attendance: 2,209; Fuenlabrada 81–97 Gran Canaria (11 May 2023)
- ^{1} Sponsored league name, referring to Endesa.

The 2022–23 ACB season, also known as Liga Endesa for sponsorship reasons, was the 40th season of the top Spanish professional basketball league, since its establishment in 1983. It started on 28 September 2022 with the regular season and ended on 20 June 2023 with the finals.

Real Madrid was the defending champion which was swept in the final series by Barça that reclaimed its 20th Spanish title and their 17th ACB title.

== Teams ==
=== Promotion and relegation (pre-season) ===
A total of 18 teams contested the league, including 16 sides from the 2021–22 season and two promoted from the 2021–22 LEB Oro.

Teams promoted from LEB Oro

- Covirán Granada
- Bàsquet Girona

Teams relegated to LEB Oro

- Hereda San Pablo Burgos
- MoraBanc Andorra

=== Venues and locations ===
Location of teams in 2022–23 ACB
Location of teams from the Canary Islands in 2022–23 ACB

| Team | Home city | Arena | Capacity |
|---|---|---|---|
| Barça | Barcelona | Palau Blaugrana | 7,585 |
| Bàsquet Girona | Girona | Fontajau | 5,050 |
| Baxi Manresa | Manresa | Nou Congost | 5,000 |
| Carplus Fuenlabrada | Fuenlabrada | Fernando Martín | 5,700 |
| Casademont Zaragoza | Zaragoza | Pabellón Príncipe Felipe | 10,744 |
| Cazoo Baskonia | Vitoria-Gasteiz | Buesa Arena | 15,716 |
| Covirán Granada | Granada | Palacio de Deportes | 7,700 |
| Gran Canaria | Las Palmas | Gran Canaria Arena | 9,870 |
| Joventut | Badalona | Palau Municipal d'Esports | 12,760 |
| Lenovo Tenerife | San Cristóbal de La Laguna | Santiago Martín | 5,100 |
| Monbus Obradoiro | Santiago de Compostela | Multiusos Fontes do Sar | 6,000 |
| Real Betis Baloncesto | Seville | San Pablo | 7,242 |
| Real Madrid | Madrid | WiZink Center | 13,109 |
| Río Breogán | Lugo | Pazo dos Deportes | 5,310 |
| Surne Bilbao Basket | Bilbao | Bilbao Arena | 10,014 |
| UCAM Murcia | Murcia | Palacio de Deportes | 7,454 |
| Unicaja | Málaga | Martín Carpena | 10,642 |
| Valencia Basket | Valencia | La Fonteta | 8,500 |

=== Personnel and sponsorship ===
| Team | Head coach | Captain | Kit manufacturer | Shirt sponsor |
|---|---|---|---|---|
| Barça | (Lithuania) Šarūnas Jasikevičius | (Spain) Pierre Oriola | Nike | Assistència Sanitària |
| Bàsquet Girona | (Spain) Aíto García Reneses | (Spain) Marc Gasol | Nike | FIATC |
| Baxi Manresa | (Spain) Pedro Martínez | (Spain) Guillem Jou | Pentex | Baxi |
| Carplus Fuenlabrada | (Spain) Óscar Quintana | (Senegal) Clevin Hannah | Kromex | Carplus |
| Casademont Zaragoza | (Spain) Porfirio Fisac | (Spain) Santiago Yusta | Mercury | Casademont |
| Cazoo Baskonia | (Spain) Joan Peñarroya | (Lithuania) Rokas Giedraitis | Puma | Cazoo |
| Covirán Granada | (Spain) Pablo Pin | (Spain) David Iriarte | Vive | Supermercados Covirán |
| Gran Canaria | (Slovenia) Jaka Lakovič | (Serbia) Oliver Stević | Spalding | |
| Joventut | (Spain) Carles Duran | (Spain) Albert Ventura | Spalding | Fundación Probitas |
| Lenovo Tenerife | (Spain) Txus Vidorreta | (Brazil) Marcelo Huertas | Austral | Lenovo, Tenerife |
| Monbus Obradoiro | (Spain) Moncho Fernández | (Spain) Álvaro Muñoz | Geff | Estrella Galicia 0,0 |
| Real Betis | (Spain) Luis Casimiro | (Spain) Pablo Almazán | Kappa | Sevilla |
| Real Madrid | (Spain) Chus Mateo | (Spain) Sergio Llull | Adidas | Autohero |
| Río Breogán | (Croatia) Veljko Mršić | (Spain) Sergi Quintela | Wibo | Estrella Galicia 0,0 |
| Surne Bilbao Basket | (Spain) Jaume Ponsarnau | (Spain) Xavi Rabaseda | Hummel | Surne Seguros |
| UCAM Murcia | (Spain) Sito Alonso | (Dominican Republic) Sadiel Rojas | Hummel | UCAM, Costa Cálida |
| Unicaja | (Spain) Ibon Navarro | (Spain) Alberto Díaz | Joma | Unicaja, Málaga |
| Valencia Basket | (Spain) Álex Mumbrú | (Montenegro) Bojan Dubljević | Luanvi | Cultura del Esfuerzo (Note: Cultura del Esfuerzo (transl. "Culture of Effort") is the motto of the club.) |

=== Managerial changes ===
| Team | Outgoing manager | Manner of departure | Date of vacancy | Position in table | Replaced with | Date of appointment |
|---|---|---|---|---|---|---|
| Surne Bilbao Basket | (Spain) Álex Mumbrú | End of contract | 6 June 2022 | Pre-season | (Spain) Jaume Ponsarnau | 21 June 2022 |
| Valencia Basket | (Spain) Joan Peñarroya | End of contract | 7 June 2022 | Pre-season | (Spain) Álex Mumbrú | 14 June 2022 |
| Cazoo Baskonia | (Croatia) Neven Spahija | End of contract | 9 June 2022 | Pre-season | (Spain) Joan Peñarroya | 13 June 2022 |
| Gran Canaria | (Spain) Porfirio Fisac | End of contract | 12 June 2022 | Pre-season | (Slovenia) Jaka Lakovič | 17 June 2022 |
| Casademont Zaragoza | (Serbia) Dragan Šakota | End of contract | 25 June 2022 | Pre-season | (Austria) Martin Schiller | 25 June 2022 |
| Bàsquet Girona | (Spain) Jordi Sargatal | End of contract | 30 June 2022 | Pre-season | (Spain) Aíto García Reneses | 8 July 2022 |
| Real Madrid | (Spain) Pablo Laso | Sacked | 4 July 2022 | Pre-season | (Spain) Chus Mateo | 25 June 2022 |
| Carplus Fuenlabrada | (Spain) Josep María Raventós | Sacked | 11 October 2022 | 17th (0–3) | (Spain) José Luis Pichel (interim) | 15 November 2022 |
| Casademont Zaragoza | (Austria) Martin Schiller | Sacked | 18 October 2022 | 17th (0–4) | (Spain) Porfirio Fisac | 19 October 2022 |
| Carplus Fuenlabrada | (Spain) José Luis Pichel | End of interim period | 24 January 2023 | 18th (3–14) | (Spain) Óscar Quintana | 24 January 2023 |

== Regular season ==
=== League table ===
| Pos | Team | Pld | W | L | PF | PA | PD | Qualification or relegation |
|---|---|---|---|---|---|---|---|---|
| 1 | Barça | 34 | 29 | 5 | 2895 | 2489 | +406 | Qualification to playoffs |
| 2 | Cazoo Baskonia | 34 | 28 | 6 | 3128 | 2817 | +311 | Qualification to playoffs |
| 3 | Real Madrid | 34 | 28 | 6 | 3005 | 2629 | +376 | Qualification to playoffs |
| 4 | Lenovo Tenerife | 34 | 24 | 10 | 2834 | 2517 | +317 | Qualification to playoffs |
| 5 | Unicaja | 34 | 24 | 10 | 2969 | 2638 | +331 | Qualification to playoffs |
| 6 | Gran Canaria | 34 | 19 | 15 | 2837 | 2734 | +103 | Qualification to playoffs |
| 7 | Joventut | 34 | 19 | 15 | 2766 | 2662 | +104 | Qualification to playoffs |
| 8 | Valencia Basket | 34 | 17 | 17 | 2842 | 2826 | +16 | Qualification to playoffs |
| 9 | UCAM Murcia | 34 | 16 | 18 | 2714 | 2820 | −106 | |
| 10 | Río Breogán | 34 | 14 | 20 | 2620 | 2716 | −96 | |
| 11 | Monbus Obradoiro | 34 | 14 | 20 | 2694 | 2832 | −138 | |
| 12 | Surne Bilbao Basket | 34 | 14 | 20 | 2587 | 2735 | −148 | |
| 13 | Casademont Zaragoza | 34 | 12 | 22 | 2675 | 2755 | −80 | |
| 14 | Baxi Manresa | 34 | 12 | 22 | 2853 | 3025 | −172 | |
| 15 | Bàsquet Girona | 34 | 11 | 23 | 2604 | 2773 | −169 | |
| 16 | Covirán Granada | 34 | 11 | 23 | 2604 | 2913 | −309 | |
| 17 | Real Betis Baloncesto | 34 | 10 | 24 | 2659 | 2857 | −198 | Relegation to LEB Oro |
| 18 | Carplus Fuenlabrada | 34 | 4 | 30 | 2589 | 3137 | −548 | Relegation to LEB Oro |

Source: ACB
Rules for classification: 1) Win–loss record; 2) Head–to–head record; 3) Head–to–head point difference; 4) Point difference; 5) Points scored; 6) Sum of quotients of points scored (Note: Head–to–head record is used only after all the matches between the teams in question have been played)

=== Results ===
| Home \ Away | BAR | GIR | BAX | FUE | CAZ | BKN | COV | GCA | JOV | LNT | MOB | BET | RMB | BRE | SBB | UCM | UNI | VBC |
|---|---|---|---|---|---|---|---|---|---|---|---|---|---|---|---|---|---|---|
| Barça | — | 72–69 | 93–72 | 101–64 | 68–63 | 89–74 | 100–82 | 87–79 | 87–71 | 67–65 | 94–77 | 104–70 | 97–82 | 82–54 | 88–78 | 86–57 | 75–60 | 81–75 |
| Bàsquet Girona | 73–84 | — | 79–86 | 85–60 | 78–69 | 70–75 | 88–73 | 69–78 | 79–66 | 72–88 | 93–76 | 79–90 | 88–94 | 66–73 | 84–59 | 100–89 | 59–73 | 75–79 |
| Baxi Manresa | 78–101 | 82–79 | — | 92–78 | 65–72 | 93–80 | 86–77 | 105–75 | 68–90 | 70–89 | 80–65 | 91–84 | 69–94 | 70–106 | 76–86 | 93–83 | 94–98 | 87–82 |
| Carplus Fuenlabrada | 56–84 | 75–83 | 101–97 | — | 71–85 | 93–112 | 81–83 | 81–97 | 81–85 | 67–95 | 79–82 | 83–77 | 78–102 | 73–92 | 77–71 | 72–88 | 85–117 | 75–93 |
| Casademont Zgz | 85–83 | 88–95 | 99–88 | 79–82 | — | 83–97 | 73–57 | 76–73 | 87–77 | 83–87 | 78–79 | 89–82 | 94–89 | 88–90 | 67–74 | 64–81 | 70–74 | 86–75 |
| Cazoo Baskonia | 84–91 | 95–68 | 107–92 | 102–88 | 91–79 | — | 105–81 | 101–97 | 84–83 | 79–85 | 110–94 | 107–103 | 88–82 | 97–76 | 100–78 | 102–73 | 103–89 | 85–79 |
| Covirán Granada | 55–70 | 78–92 | 84–87 | 83–71 | 71–68 | 84–95 | — | 80–66 | 73–62 | 73–82 | 93–89 | 66–76 | 62–82 | 80–70 | 99–84 | 88–67 | 69–101 | 81–110 |
| Gran Canaria | 88–85 | 78–73 | 99–88 | 110–65 | 88–72 | 68–96 | 94–76 | — | 100–88 | 70–86 | 75–68 | 87–71 | 67–95 | 77–66 | 94–71 | 107–89 | 88–70 | 95–89 |
| Joventut | 82–79 | 92–64 | 73–65 | 103–86 | 89–84 | 77–86 | 90–72 | 75–91 | — | 78–69 | 96–85 | 93–81 | 78–86 | 85–66 | 76–81 | 94–68 | 74–65 | 85–70 |
| Lenovo Tenerife | 76–79 | 76–67 | 100–87 | 97–72 | 92–69 | 83–81 | 98–66 | 81–77 | 85–68 | — | 86–67 | 88–64 | 67–80 | 85–67 | 73–57 | 109–111 | 91–84 | 94–78 |
| Monbus Obradoiro | 76–74 | 89–63 | 104–99 | 102–72 | 76–73 | 91–86 | 88–83 | 58–85 | 74–91 | 58–78 | — | 67–82 | 78–84 | 67–74 | 77–64 | 81–79 | 86–87 | 98–103 |
| Real Betis Baloncesto | 77–85 | 71–79 | 87–83 | 87–77 | 67–83 | 71–83 | 85–91 | 88–82 | 67–71 | 80–76 | 71–73 | — | 55–73 | 84–89 | 86–78 | 84–71 | 66–79 | 78–83 |
| Real Madrid | 78–87 | 89–70 | 103–89 | 91–69 | 93–86 | 88–95 | 108–75 | 105–85 | 96–79 | 88–77 | 93–79 | 79–77 | — | 91–73 | 86–65 | 93–57 | 102–90 | 79–62 |
| Río Breogán | 74–78 | 92–70 | 81–82 | 78–70 | 71–87 | 77–86 | 99–67 | 53–71 | 65–85 | 61–86 | 64–59 | 114–115 | 96–72 | — | 86–70 | 60–65 | 74–90 | 83–88 |
| Surne Bilbao | 82–80 | 84–77 | 80–76 | 109–82 | 81–68 | 70–81 | 90–73 | 76–72 | 51–70 | 60–83 | 77–80 | 85–70 | 80–85 | 83–66 | — | 99–81 | 71–103 | 71–65 |
| UCAM Murcia | 72–86 | 102–79 | 96–83 | 83–64 | 79–74 | 80–87 | 82–89 | 99–85 | 88–76 | 85–64 | 80–84 | 76–72 | 80–88 | 70–84 | 67–55 | — | 85–80 | 90–82 |
| Unicaja | 81–86 | 94–70 | 97–88 | 100–75 | 104–78 | 81–89 | 94–68 | 70–63 | 78–69 | 75–71 | 99–89 | 106–60 | 71–76 | 100–66 | 92–79 | 82–66 | — | 102–86 |
| Valencia Basket | 80–92 | 104–69 | 103–92 | 92–86 | 88–76 | 81–85 | 80–72 | 82–76 | 101–97 | 77–72 | 87–78 | 87–81 | 68–79 | 77–80 | 95–88 | 74–75 | 67–83 | — |

Source: ACB
Legend: Blue = home team win; Red = away team win.

== Playoffs ==
Quarterfinals
1 | Barça | 84 | 87 | 2
8 | Valencia Basket | 74 | 64 | 0
4 | Lenovo Tenerife | 59 | 74 | 0
5 | Unicaja | 72 | 97 | 2
3 | Real Madrid | 95 | 89 | 2
6 | Dreamland Gran Canaria | 68 | 81 | 0
2 | Cazoo Baskonia | 91 | 76 | 0
7 | Joventut | 99 | 83 | 2

Semifinals
1 | Barça | 84 | 79 | 90 | 87 | 3
5 | Unicaja | 81 | 88 | 79 | 75 | 1
3 | Real Madrid | 83 | 90 | 83 | 94 | 3
7 | Joventut | 93 | 73 | 73 | 73 | 1

Finals
1 | Barça | 97 | 86 | 93 | 3
3 | Real Madrid | 88 | 85 | 82 | 0

== Final standings ==
| Pos | Team | Pld | W | L | Qualification or relegation |
|---|---|---|---|---|---|
| 1 | Barça (C) | 43 | 37 | 6 | Already qualified to EuroLeague |
| 2 | Real Madrid | 43 | 33 | 10 | Already qualified to EuroLeague |
| 3 | Unicaja | 40 | 27 | 13 | Qualification to Champions League regular season |
| 4 | Joventut | 40 | 22 | 18 | Qualification to EuroCup |
| 5 | Cazoo Baskonia | 36 | 28 | 8 | Already qualified to EuroLeague |
| 6 | Lenovo Tenerife | 36 | 24 | 12 | Qualification to Champions League regular season |
| 7 | Gran Canaria | 36 | 19 | 17 | Qualification to EuroCup |
| 8 | Valencia Basket | 36 | 17 | 19 | Already qualified to EuroLeague |
| 9 | UCAM Murcia | 34 | 16 | 18 | Qualification to Champions League regular season |
| 10 | Río Breogán | 34 | 14 | 20 | Qualification to Champions League regular season |
| 11 | Monbus Obradoiro | 34 | 14 | 20 | Qualification to Champions League qualifying rounds |
| 12 | Surne Bilbao Basket | 34 | 14 | 20 | Qualification to FIBA Europe Cup regular season |
| 13 | Casademont Zaragoza | 34 | 12 | 22 | Qualification to FIBA Europe Cup qualifying rounds |
| 14 | Baxi Manresa | 34 | 12 | 22 | |
| 15 | Bàsquet Girona | 34 | 11 | 23 | |
| 16 | Covirán Granada | 34 | 11 | 23 | |
| 17 | Real Betis Baloncesto (R) | 34 | 10 | 24 | Relegation to LEB Oro |
| 18 | Carplus Fuenlabrada (R) | 34 | 4 | 30 | Relegation to LEB Oro |

Source: ACB
(C) Champions; (R) Relegated

== Statistical leaders ==
=== Performance Index Rating ===
| Pos | Player | Club | PIR |
|---|---|---|---|
| 1 | (Cape Verde) Edy Tavares | Real Madrid | 18.5 |
| 2 | (Georgia (country)) Giorgi Shermadini | Lenovo Tenerife | 18.0 |
| 3 | (United States) Ethan Happ | Río Breogán | 17.3 |
| 4 | (Croatia) Ante Tomić | Joventut | 16.4 |
| 5 | (Spain) Marc Gasol | Bàsquet Girona | 16.2 |

=== Points ===
| Pos | Player | Club | PPG |
|---|---|---|---|
| 1 | (Canada) Kassius Robertson | Monbus Obradoiro | 17.4 |
| 2 | (United States) Markus Howard | Cazoo Baskonia | 16.5 |
| 3 | (United States) Jerrick Harding | Baxi Manresa | 16.2 |
| 4 | (United States) Kameron Taylor | Bàsquet Girona | 14.5 |
| 5 | (Bosnia and Herzegovina) Džanan Musa | Real Madrid | 14.4 |

=== Rebounds ===
| Pos | Player | Club | RPG |
|---|---|---|---|
| 1 | (United States) Ethan Happ | Río Breogán | 7.9 |
| 2 | (Spain) Tyson Pérez | Real Betis Baloncesto | 7.7 |
| 3 | (Cape Verde) Edy Tavares | Real Madrid | 7.0 |
| 4 | (Montenegro) Bojan Dubljević | Valencia Basket | 6.8 |
| 5 | (Ukraine) Volodymyr Gerun | Real Betis Baloncesto | 6.6 |

=== Assists ===
| Pos | Player | Club | APG |
|---|---|---|---|
| 1 | (Serbia) Jovan Novak | Carplus Fuenlabrada | 7.6 |
| 2 | (United States) Darius Thompson | Cazoo Baskonia | 6.2 |
| 3 | (Spain) Dani Pérez | Baxi Manresa | 6.1 |
| 4 | (Brazil) Marcelo Huertas | Lenovo Tenerife | 5.6 |
| 5 | (Bosnia and Herzegovina) Alex Renfroe | Covirán Granada | 5.2 |

Source: ACB

== Attendances to arenas ==
=== Average attendances ===
| Pos | Team | Total | High | Low | Average | Change |
|---|---|---|---|---|---|---|
| 1 | Unicaja | 182,159 | 10,602 | 6,232 | 9,108 | +114.9% |
| 2 | Cazoo Baskonia | 157,929 | 15,501 | 5,706 | 8,774 | +29.5% |
| 3 | Surne Bilbao Basket | 133,375 | 9,972 | 6,173 | 7,846 | +32.3% |
| 4 | Real Madrid | 158,754 | 11,965 | 5,517 | 7,560 | +32.4% |
| 5 | Joventut | 142,379 | 12,323 | 4,162 | 7,119 | +23.8% |
| 6 | Covirán Granada | 111,878 | 8,319 | 5,247 | 6,581 | n/a^{1} |
| 7 | Barça | 131,453 | 7,580 | 3,946 | 5,975 | +18.7% |
| 8 | Valencia Basket | 105,177 | 7,963 | 3,471 | 5,843 | +31.6% |
| 9 | Casademont Zaragoza | 98,622 | 7,499 | 3,630 | 5,801 | +12.4% |
| 10 | Gran Canaria | 104,232 | 8,517 | 4,059 | 5,791 | +39.4% |
| 11 | UCAM Murcia | 90,350 | 7,500 | 3,491 | 5,315 | +10.3% |
| 12 | Monbus Obradoiro | 88,376 | 6,000 | 4,712 | 5,119 | +20.5% |
| 13 | Río Breogán | 85,983 | 5,235 | 4,810 | 5,058 | +20.3% |
| 14 | Bàsquet Girona | 83,791 | 5,195 | 4,360 | 4,929 | n/a^{1} |
| 15 | Real Betis Baloncesto | 83,678 | 7,242 | 2,454 | 4,922 | +25.1% |
| 16 | Lenovo Tenerife | 87,848 | 5,219 | 3,884 | 4,880 | +40.8% |
| 17 | Baxi Manresa | 79,764 | 5,000 | 4,062 | 4,692 | +25.0% |
| 18 | Carplus Fuenlabrada | 76,112 | 4,981 | 2,209 | 4,477 | +21.6% |
| | League total | 2,001,860 | 15,501 | 2,209 | 6,160 | +28.1% |

Source: ACB
Notes:
1: Team played last season in LEB Oro.

== Awards ==
All official awards of the 2022–23 ACB season.

=== MVP ===
| Pos. | Player | Team |
|---|---|---|
| C | (Georgia (country)) Giorgi Shermadini | Lenovo Tenerife |

=== Finals MVP ===
| Pos. | Player | Team |
|---|---|---|
| PF | (Spain) Nikola Mirotić | Barça |

=== All-ACB Teams ===
| Pos. | First Team | | Second Team | |
| Pos. | Player | Team | Player | Team |
|---|---|---|---|---|
| PG | (United States) Darius Thompson | Cazoo Baskonia | (Brazil) Marcelinho Huertas | Lenovo Tenerife |
| SG | (United States) Markus Howard | Cazoo Baskonia | (Argentina) Nicolás Laprovíttola | Barça |
| SF | (Bosnia and Herzegovina) Džanan Musa | Real Madrid | (Spain) Joel Parra | Joventut |
| PF | (Georgia (country)) Giorgi Shermadini | Lenovo Tenerife | (Spain) Nikola Mirotić | Barça |
| C | (Cape Verde) Edy Tavares | Real Madrid | (Croatia) Ante Tomić | Joventut |

=== Best Young Player Award ===
| Pos. | Player | Team |
|---|---|---|
| SG | (Dominican Republic) Jean Montero | Real Betis Baloncesto |

=== Best All-Young Team ===
| Pos. | Player | Team |
|---|---|---|
| PG | (Germany) Justus Hollatz | Río Breogán |
| SG | (Dominican Republic) Jean Montero | Real Betis Baloncesto |
| SF | (Spain) Michael Caicedo | Covirán Granada |
| PF | (Senegal) Khalifa Diop | Gran Canaria |
| C | (Spain) Aday Mara | Casademont Zaragoza |

=== Best Defender ===
| Pos. | Player | Team |
|---|---|---|
| C | (Cape Verde) Edy Tavares | Real Madrid |

=== Player of the round ===
| Round | Player | Team | PIR |
|---|---|---|---|
| 1 | (Spain) Marc Gasol | Bàsquet Girona | 34 |
| 2 | (Cuba) Jasiel Rivero | Valencia Basket | 30 |
| 3 | (Guinea) Shannon Evans | Real Betis Baloncesto | 33 |
| 4 | (France) Damien Inglis | Gran Canaria | 32 |
| 5 | (United States) Travis Trice | UCAM Murcia | 35 |
| 6 | (United States) Travis Trice (2) | UCAM Murcia | 31 |
| 7 | (United States) Justinian Jessup | Casademont Zaragoza | 31 |
| 8 | (Spain) Jaime Fernández | Lenovo Tenerife | 30 |
| 9 | (Serbia) Dušan Ristić | Carplus Fuenlabrada | 28 |
| 10 | (Ivory Coast) Matt Costello | Cazoo Baskonia | 31 |
| 11 | (Guinea) Shannon Evans (2) | Real Betis Baloncesto | 36 |
| 12 | (United States) Markus Howard | Cazoo Baskonia | 31 |
| 13 | (Sweden) Ludde Håkanson | Surne Bilbao Basket | 33 |
| 14 | (Lithuania) Martinas Geben | Baxi Manresa | 30 |
| 14 | (Cape Verde) Edy Tavares | Real Madrid | 30 |
| 15 | (Georgia (country)) Giorgi Shermadini | Lenovo Tenerife | 36 |
| 16 | (Ukraine) Volodymyr Gerun | Real Betis Baloncesto | 39 |
| 17 | (United States) Ethan Happ | Río Breogán | 37 |
| 18 | (Georgia (country)) Giorgi Shermadini (2) | Lenovo Tenerife | 30 |
| 19 | (Argentina) Nicolás Brussino | Gran Canaria | 49 |
| 20 | (Montenegro) Kendrick Perry | Unicaja | 37 |
| 21 | (Serbia) Nemanja Nenadić | Río Breogán | 35 |
| 22 | (Czech Republic) Tomáš Satoranský | Barça | 29 |
| 23 | (United States) Jerrick Harding | Baxi Manresa | 39 |
| 24 | (Nigeria) Christian Mekowulu | Casademont Zaragoza | 36 |
| 25 | (Australia) Keanu Pinder | Carplus Fuenlabrada | 30 |
| 26 | (Spain) Tyson Pérez | Real Betis Baloncesto | 29 |
| 27 | (Bosnia and Herzegovina) Džanan Musa | Real Madrid | 33 |
| 28 | (Canada) Kassius Robertson | Monbus Obradoiro | 40 |
| 29 | (United States) Kameron Taylor | Bàsquet Girona | 40 |
| 30 | (United States) Adam Smith | Surne Bilbao Basket | 32 |
| 31 | (France) Guerschon Yabusele | Real Madrid | 33 |
| 32 | (Brazil) Marcelinho Huertas | Lenovo Tenerife | 47 |
| 33 | (United States) Kyle Guy | Joventut | 28 |
| 33 | (United States) Joe Thomasson | Covirán Granada | 28 |
| 33 | (France) Guerschon Yabusele (2) | Real Madrid | 28 |
| 34 | (Senegal) Brancou Badio | Baxi Manresa | 30 |

=== Player of the month ===
| Month | Rounds | Player | Team | PIR | W–L | Ref |
|---|---|---|---|---|---|---|
| October | 1–6 | (Cuba) Jasiel Rivero | Valencia Basket | 26.5 | 2–2 | |
| November | 7–9 | (Croatia) Ante Tomić | Joventut | 21.0 | 2–1 | |
| December | 10–13 | (Cuba) Jasiel Rivero (2) | Valencia Basket | 20.7 | 2–1 | |
| January | 14–18 | (Cape Verde) Edy Tavares | Real Madrid | 26.8 | 4–1 | |
| January | 14–18 | (Georgia (country)) Giorgi Shermadini | Lenovo Tenerife | 26.8 | 4–1 | |
| February | 19–20 | (Argentina) Nicolás Brussino | Gran Canaria | 31.5 | 1–1 | |
| March | 21–24 | (United States) Ethan Happ | Río Breogán | 20.8 | 2–2 | |
| April | 25–30 | (Montenegro) Bojan Dubljević | Valencia Basket | 23.5 | 3–1 | |
| May | 31–34 | (France) Guerschon Yabusele | Real Madrid | 25.0 | 4–0 | |

== ACB clubs in international competitions ==
Euroleague Basketball competitions
| Team | Competition | Progress | Result | W–L |
|---|---|---|---|---|
| Real Madrid | EuroLeague | Championship game | Win vs. (Hellenic Basketball Federation) Olympiacos | 28–13 |
| Real Madrid | EuroLeague | Semifinals | Win vs. (Spanish Basketball Federation) Barcelona | 28–13 |
| Real Madrid | EuroLeague | Playoffs | 3–2 vs. (Basketball Federation of Serbia) Partizan Mozzart Bet | 28–13 |
| Real Madrid | EuroLeague | Regular season | 3rd of 18 teams (23–11) | 28–13 |
| Barça | EuroLeague | Third place game | Loss vs. (French Federation of Basketball) AS Monaco | 26–13 |
| Barça | EuroLeague | Semifinals | Loss vs. (Spanish Basketball Federation) Real Madrid | 26–13 |
| Barça | EuroLeague | Playoffs | 3–0 vs. (Lithuanian Basketball Federation) Žalgiris | 26–13 |
| Barça | EuroLeague | Regular season | 2nd of 18 teams (23–11) | 26–13 |
| Cazoo Baskonia | EuroLeague | Regular season | 9th of 18 teams (18–16) | 18–16 |
| Valencia Basket | EuroLeague | Regular season | 13th of 18 teams (15–19) | 15–19 |
| Gran Canaria | EuroCup | Final | Win vs. (Turkish Basketball Federation) Türk Telekom | 19–3 |
| Gran Canaria | EuroCup | Semifinals | Win vs. (Spanish Basketball Federation) Joventut | 19–3 |
| Gran Canaria | EuroCup | Quarterfinals | Win vs. (French Federation of Basketball) Paris Basketball | 19–3 |
| Gran Canaria | EuroCup | Eighthfinals | Win vs. (Turkish Basketball Federation) Frutti Extra Bursaspor | 19–3 |
| Gran Canaria | EuroCup | Regular season Group B | 1st of 10 teams (15–3) | 19–3 |
| Joventut | EuroCup | Semifinals | Loss vs. (Spanish Basketball Federation) Gran Canaria | 15–6 |
| Joventut | EuroCup | Quarterfinals | Win vs. (Israeli Basketball Association) Hapoel Vegan Friendly Tel Aviv | 15–6 |
| Joventut | EuroCup | Eighthfinals | Win vs. (British Basketball) London Lions | 15–6 |
| Joventut | EuroCup | Regular season Group A | 2nd of 10 teams (13–5) | 15–6 |

FIBA competitions
| Team | Competition | Progress | Result | W–L |
|---|---|---|---|---|
| Lenovo Tenerife | Intercontinental Cup | Final | Win vs. (Brazil) São Paulo | 2–0 |
| Lenovo Tenerife | Intercontinental Cup | Semi-finals | Win vs. (Tunisia) US Monastir | 2–0 |
| Lenovo Tenerife | Champions League | Third place game | Win vs. (Spanish Basketball Federation) Unicaja | 12–5 |
| Lenovo Tenerife | Champions League | Semi-finals | Loss vs. (Israeli Basketball Association) Hapoel Jerusalem | 12–5 |
| Lenovo Tenerife | Champions League | Quarter-finals | 2–1 vs. (Spanish Basketball Federation) Baxi Manresa | 12–5 |
| Lenovo Tenerife | Champions League | Round of 16 Group L | 1st of 4 teams (5–1) | 12–5 |
| Lenovo Tenerife | Champions League | Regular season Group H | 1st of 4 teams (4–2) | 12–5 |
| Unicaja | Champions League | Third place game | Loss vs. (Spanish Basketball Federation) Lenovo Tenerife | 14–4 |
| Unicaja | Champions League | Semi-finals | Loss vs. (German Basketball Federation) Telekom Baskets Bonn | 14–4 |
| Unicaja | Champions League | Quarter-finals | 2–0 vs. (Spanish Basketball Federation) UCAM Murcia | 14–4 |
| Unicaja | Champions League | Round of 16 Group K | 1st of 4 teams (5–1) | 14–4 |
| Unicaja | Champions League | Regular season Group G | 1st of 4 teams (5–1) | 14–4 |
| Unicaja | Champions League | Qualifying tournament B Final | Win vs. (Slovak Basketball Association) Patrioti Levice | 14–4 |
| Unicaja | Champions League | Qualifying tournament B Semi-final | Win vs. (Basketball Nederland) Heroes Den Bosch | 14–4 |
| UCAM Murcia | Champions League | Quarter-finals | 0–2 vs. (Spanish Basketball Federation) Unicaja | 10–6 |
| UCAM Murcia | Champions League | Round of 16 Group L | 2nd of 4 teams (4–2) | 10–6 |
| UCAM Murcia | Champions League | Play-ins | 2–0 vs. (Turkish Basketball Federation) Pınar Karşıyaka | 10–6 |
| UCAM Murcia | Champions League | Regular season Group A | 2nd of 4 teams (4–2) | 10–6 |
| Baxi Manresa | Champions League | Quarter-finals | 1–2 vs. (Spanish Basketball Federation) Lenovo Tenerife | 8–7 |
| Baxi Manresa | Champions League | Round of 16 Group J | 2nd of 4 teams (3–3) | 8–7 |
| Baxi Manresa | Champions League | Regular season Group F | 1st of 4 teams (4–2) | 8–7 |
| Surne Bilbao Basket | Champions League | Round of 16 Group L | 4th of 4 teams (1–5) | 5–7 |
| Surne Bilbao Basket | Champions League | Regular season Group D | 1st of 4 teams (4–2) | 5–7 |
| Río Breogán | Champions League | Qualifying tournament D Quarter-final | Loss vs. (Basketball Federation of Serbia) FMP Meridian | 0–1 |
