= 2022–23 Basketball Champions League playoffs =

The 2022–23 Basketball Champions League playoffs began on April 4, 2023, and concluded with the 2023 Basketball Champions League Final Four, to decide the champions of the 2022–23 Basketball Champions League. A total of eight teams competed in the play-offs.

== Format ==
The 8 qualified clubs have been ranked according to their final position within their respective group during the Round of 16 and their place in the Draw was based on this ranking. The teams having finished 1st of their Round of 16 group was placed in Pot 1, the teams having finished 2nd of their Round of 16 group was placed in Pot 2. The draw was held on March 24, 2023.

The quarterfinals will be played in a best-of-3 series and start on April 4. The seeded teams will play their first (and potential third) game at home, the unseeded teams will play their second game at home.

The four winning clubs will qualify for the Final Four. The 4 qualified teams will play the final four between May 12–14, 2023.

== Qualified teams ==
Key to colors
Seeded teams	Unseeded teams

Group	Winners	Runners-up
I	(Israel) Hapoel Jerusalem	(France) SIG Strasbourg
J	(Germany) Telekom Baskets Bonn	(Spain) Baxi Manresa
K	(Spain) Unicaja	(Greece) AEK
L	(Spain) Lenovo Tenerife	(Spain) UCAM Murcia

== Bracket ==
Quarterfinals
(Spain) Unicaja	83	96	—
(Spain) UCAM Murcia	67	74	—
(Germany) Telekom Baskets Bonn	76	76	83
(France) SIG Strasbourg	77	66	77
(Spain) Lenovo Tenerife	91	83	84
(Spain) Baxi Manresa	84	85	72
(Israel) Hapoel Jerusalem	64	78	91
(Greece) AEK	55	94	51

Semifinals
12 May
(Spain) Unicaja	67
(Germany) Telekom Baskets Bonn	69
12 May
(Spain) Lenovo Tenerife	68
(Israel) Hapoel Jerusalem	69

Final
14 May
(Germany) Telekom Baskets Bonn	77
(Israel) Hapoel Jerusalem	70
Third place
14 May
(Spain) Unicaja	79
(Spain) Lenovo Tenerife	84

== Quarterfinals ==
Team 1	Series	Team 2	Game 1	Game 2	Game 3
Telekom Baskets Bonn (Germany)	2–1	(France) SIG Strasbourg	76–77	76–66	83–77
Hapoel Jerusalem (Israel)	2–1	(Greece) AEK	64–55	78–94	91–51
Lenovo Tenerife (Spain)	2–1	(Spain) Baxi Manresa	91–84	83–85	84–72
Unicaja (Spain)	2–0	(Spain) UCAM Murcia	83–67	96–74	—

=== Telekom Baskets Bonn vs. SIG Strasbourg ===
5 April 2023	Telekom Baskets Bonn (Germany)	76–77 (Series: 0–1)	(France) SIG Strasbourg	Bonn
20:00	Scoring by quarter: 25–22, 17–18, 16–20, 18–17
	Pts: Shorts 24; Rebs: Kratzer 7 Asts: Shorts 6 Eff: Shorts 23	Boxscore	Pts: Keene 26; Rebs: Cavalière 8 Asts: five players 2 Eff: Keene 17	Arena: Telekom Dome; Referees: Boris Krejić (SVN), Mārtiņš Kozlovskis (LVA), Beniamino Attard (ITA)

11 April 2023	SIG Strasbourg (France)	66–76 (Series: 1–1)	(Germany) Telekom Baskets Bonn	Strasbourg
20:00	Scoring by quarter: 17–18, 11–23, 20–23, 18–12
	Pts: Keene 20; Rebs: Udanoh 9 Asts: three players 3 Eff: Lacombe, Massa 17	Boxscore	Pts: Herrera 19; Rebs: Kessens 10; Asts: Kessens 5 Eff: Kessens 26	Arena: Rhénus Sport; Referees: Manuel Mazzoni (ITA), Fernando Calatrava (SPA), Lorenzo Baldini (ITA)

18 April 2023	Telekom Baskets Bonn (Germany)	83–77 (Series: 2–1)	(France) SIG Strasbourg	Bonn
20:00	Scoring by quarter: 21–26, 23–20, 19–19, 20–12
	Pts: Shorts 24; Rebs: Ward 8 Asts: Shorts 6 Eff: Ward 21	Boxscore	Pts: Frazier 20; Rebs: Lacombe 7 Asts: Frazier 5 Eff: Frazier 20	Arena: Telekom Dome; Referees: Ademir Zurapović (BIH), Luis Castillo (ESP), Kerem Baki (TUR)

=== Hapoel Jerusalem vs. AEK ===
4 April 2023	Hapoel Jerusalem (Israel)	64–55 (Series: 1–0)	(Greece) AEK	Jerusalem
20:00	Scoring by quarter: 26–6, 10–18, 13–21, 15–10
	Pts: Smith 20; Rebs: Hankins 9 Asts: Hankins, Smith 3 Eff: Hankins 19	Boxscore	Pts: Williams 18; Rebs: Mitchell 7 Asts: Mitchell 7 Eff: Mitchell 18	Arena: Pais Arena; Referees: Manuel Mazzoni (ITA), Lorenzo Baldini (ITA), Gatis Saliņš (LVA)

12 April 2023	AEK (Greece)	94–78 (Series: 1–1)	(Israel) Hapoel Jerusalem	Athens
16:30	Scoring by quarter: 20–21, 27–16, 23–21, 24–20
	Pts: Lemar 24; Rebs: Miles, Mitchell 7 Asts: Flionis 6 Eff: Mitchell 24	Boxscore	Pts: Randolph 28; Rebs: Hankins 5 Asts: Smith 8 Eff: Randolph 25	Arena: Ano Liosia Olympic Hall; Referees: Yohan Rosso (FRA), Boris Krejic (SVN), Luis Miguel Castillo (SPA)

19 April 2023	Hapoel Jerusalem (Israel)	91–51 (Series: 2–1)	(Greece) AEK	Jerusalem
18:00	Scoring by quarter: 18–7, 25–15, 16–14, 32–15
	Pts: Randolph 25; Rebs: Hankins 6 Asts: Carrington 6 Eff: Randolph 27	Boxscore	Pts: Lemar 21; Rebs: Mitchell 7 Asts: Mitchell 4 Eff: Lemar 15	Arena: Pais Arena; Referees: Antonio Conde (ESP), Wojciech Liszka (POL), Martins Kozlovskis (LAT)

=== Lenovo Tenerife vs. Baxi Manresa ===
5 April 2023	Lenovo Tenerife (Spain)	91–84 (Series: 1–0)	(Spain) Baxi Manresa	Tenerife
20:30	Scoring by quarter: 20–27, 26–13, 23–18, 22–26
	Pts: Shermadini 18; Rebs: Doornekamp 8 Asts: Huertas 9 Eff: Shermadini 19	Boxscore	Pts: Harding 21; Rebs: Robinson 6 Asts: D.Pérez 5 Eff: Robinson 22	Arena: Santiago Martín; Referees: Ademir Zurapović (BIH), Wojciech Liszka (POL), Paulo Marques (POR)

12 April 2023	Baxi Manresa (Spain)	85–83 (Series: 1–1)	(Spain) Lenovo Tenerife	Manresa
20:45	Scoring by quarter: 18–25, 24–18, 23–22, 20–18
	Pts: Badio, Robinson 16; Rebs: Robinson 6 Asts: five players 2 Eff: Robinson 22	Boxscore	Pts: Huertas 19; Rebs: Cook, Doornekamp 5 Asts: Huertas 7 Eff: Fitipaldo 22	Arena: Pavelló Nou Congost; Referees: Mārtiņš Kozlovskis (LVA), Saverio Lanzarini (ITA), Gvidas Gedvilas (LTU)

19 April 2023	Lenovo Tenerife (Spain)	84–72 (Series: 2–1)	(Spain) Baxi Manresa	Tenerife
20:30	Scoring by quarter: 20–18, 25–18, 19–18, 20–18
	Eff:	Boxscore	Eff:	Arena: Santiago Martín

=== Unicaja vs. UCAM Murcia ===
4 April 2023	Unicaja (Spain)	83–67 (Series: 1–0)	(Spain) UCAM Murcia	Málaga
20:30	Scoring by quarter: 23–10, 22–17, 23–18, 15–22
	Pts: Brizuela 19; Rebs: Ejim, Thomas 4 Asts: Brizuela, Carter 3 Eff: Brizuela 21	Boxscore	Pts: Pustovyi 11; Rebs: Radović 5 Asts: Anderson, Andronikashvili 2 Eff: Andronikashvili 13	Arena: Palacio de Deportes José María Martín Carpena; Referees: Yohan Rosso (FRA), Saverio Lanzarini (ITA), Aleksandar Glišić (SRB)

12 April 2023	UCAM Murcia (Spain)	74–96 (Series: 0–2)	(Spain) Unicaja	Murcia
20:30	Scoring by quarter: 20–16, 20–24, 20–29, 14–27
	Pts: Anderson 12; Rebs: Rojas 5 Asts: Trice 7 Eff: Rojas, Trice 11	Boxscore	Pts: Brizuela 17; Rebs: Barreiro 9 Asts: Brizuela 4 Eff: Kravish 21	Arena: Palacio de Deportes; Referees: Wojciech Liszka (POL), Kerem Baki (TUR), Gatis Saliņš (LVA)
