= 2022–23 Basketball Bundesliga =

German club basketball season

Basketball Bundesliga
- Season: 2022–23
- Dates: 28 September 2022 – 16 June 2023
- Games played: 306
- Teams: 18

Regular season
- Top seed: Telekom Baskets Bonn
- EuroLeague: Bayern Munich; Alba Berlin
- EuroCup: Ratiopharm Ulm
- Champions League: Telekom Baskets Bonn; Riesen Ludwigsburg; Baskets Oldenburg; BG Göttingen
- Season MVP: (North Macedonia) T. J. Shorts (Bonn)
- Relegated: Skyliners Frankfurt; Medi Bayreuth

Finals
- Champions: Ratiopharm Ulm
- Runners-up: Telekom Baskets Bonn
- Semi-finalists: Bayern Munich; Riesen Ludwigsburg

Statistical leaders
Points	(United States) DeWayne Russell	20.3
Rebounds	(United States) Derek Cooke	8.9
Assists	(United States) DeWayne Russell	7.7

Records
- Attendance: 1,263,770
- Average attendance: 4,246

Seasons
- ← 2021–22 2023–24 →

The 2022–23 Basketball Bundesliga, known as the easyCredit BBL for sponsorship reasons, was the 57th season of the Basketball Bundesliga (BBL), the top-tier level of professional club basketball in Germany. It ran from 28 September 2022 to 16 June 2023.

In October 2022, the BBL decided to change the standings formula, changing from two points for a win to a percentage criteria.

Ratiopharm Ulm won their first title by defeating Telekom Baskets Bonn 3–1 in the final.

== Teams ==
Location of teams in 2022–23 Basketball Bundesliga

=== Team changes ===
Promoted from 2021–22 ProA	Relegated from 2021–22 Basketball Bundesliga
Rostock Seawolves	~~Skyliners Frankfurt~~; Giessen 46ers

As only one team was promoted, Frankfurt was awarded a wild card on 2 June 2022.

=== Arenas and locations ===
Team	City	Arena	Capacity
Brose Bamberg	Bamberg	Brose Arena	6,150
Medi Bayreuth	Bayreuth	Oberfrankenhalle	4,000
Alba Berlin	Berlin	Mercedes-Benz Arena	14,500
Telekom Baskets Bonn	Bonn	Telekom Dome	6,000
Löwen Braunschweig	Braunschweig	Volkswagen Halle	6,600
Niners Chemnitz	Chemnitz	Chemnitz Arena	5,200
Crailsheim Merlins	Crailsheim	Arena Hohenlohe	3,000
Skyliners Frankfurt	Frankfurt	Fraport Arena	5,002
BG Göttingen	Göttingen	Sparkassen Arena	3,447
Hamburg Towers	Hamburg	Edel-optics.de Arena	3,400
MLP Academics Heidelberg	Heidelberg	SNP Dome	5,000
MHP Riesen Ludwigsburg	Ludwigsburg	MHP-Arena	5,300
Syntainics MBC	Weißenfels	Stadthalle Weißenfels	3,000
Bayern Munich	Munich	Audi Dome	6,700
EWE Baskets Oldenburg	Oldenburg	Große EWE Arena	6,069
Rostock Seawolves	Rostock	Stadthalle Rostock	4,550
ratiopharm Ulm	Ulm	ratiopharm arena	6,000
s.Oliver Würzburg	Würzburg	s.Oliver Arena	3,140

== Regular season ==
=== Standings ===
Pos	Team	Pld	W	L	PF	PA	PD	PCT	Qualification or relegation
1	Telekom Baskets Bonn	34	32	2	3042	2477	+565	.941	Playoffs
2	Alba Berlin	34	31	3	3002	2615	+387	.912	Playoffs
3	Bayern Munich	34	25	9	2782	2563	+219	.735	Playoffs
4	Baskets Oldenburg	34	22	12	2939	2825	+114	.647	Playoffs
5	Riesen Ludwigsburg	34	19	15	2957	2915	+42	.559 (Note: Ludwigsburg 170–163 Göttingen)	Playoffs
6	BG Göttingen	34	19	15	2902	2932	−30	.559	Playoffs
7	Ratiopharm Ulm	34	18	16	3029	2929	+100	.529	Playoffs
8	Niners Chemnitz	34	16	18	2843	2813	+30	.471 (Note: Chemnitz 165–152 Rostock)	Playoffs
9	Rostock Seawolves	34	16	18	2857	3021	−164	.471	
10	Brose Bamberg	34	15	19	2996	3021	−25	.441 (Note: All teams with 2 wins, ranked on head-to-head points scored)	
11	s.Oliver Würzburg	34	15	19	2752	2839	−87	.441	
12	MLP Academics Heidelberg	34	15	19	2976	3046	−70	.441	
13	Crailsheim Merlins	34	12	22	2879	3005	−126	.353 (Note: Crailsheim 3 wins, Braunschweig 2 wins, Hamburg 1 win)	
14	Basketball Löwen Braunschweig	34	12	22	2725	2829	−104	.353	
15	Hamburg Towers	34	12	22	2751	2924	−173	.353	
16	Mitteldeutscher BC	34	11	23	2881	3041	−160	.324	
17	Skyliners Frankfurt	34	10	24	2726	2940	−214	.294	Relegation to ProA
18	Medi Bayreuth	34	6	28	2805	3109	−304	.176	Relegation to ProA

Source: BBL
Rules for classification: 1) points; 2) head-to-head points; 3) head-to-head points difference; 4) head-to-head number of points scored.

=== Results ===
Home \ Away	BAM	BAY	BER	BON	BRA	CHE	CRA	FRA	GOT	HAM	HEI	LUD	MBC	MUN	OLD	ROS	ULM	WUR
Brose Bamberg	—	120–106	80–90	75–102	83–92	96–83	82–84	100–83	95–92	66–76	101–74	81–73	90–98	87–94	89–78	88–94	97–77	99–106
Medi Bayreuth	92–86	—	72–83	71–94	76–77	86–102	99–77	83–82	73–95	79–95	96–102	94–108	95–84	79–80	85–75	83–92	64–80	83–99
Alba Berlin	84–67	91–83	—	81–76	85–78	101–91	100–77	99–74	91–78	81–78	78–70	99–91	86–60	71–76	89–81	104–79	91–79	76–47
Telekom Baskets Bonn	84–76	86–42	84–77	—	89–78	80–73	101–83	89–66	94–85	76–66	98–65	91–75	91–57	78–68	108–79	99–71	85–83	94–73
Basketball Löwen Braunschweig	83–85	101–89	90–95	72–79	—	78–71	91–101	86–71	64–78	88–78	89–82	66–80	73–89	63–74	76–84	71–87	84–67	82–89
Niners Chemnitz	75–88	84–77	70–76	79–81	73–83	—	106–94	89–76	86–87	87–80	87–78	89–90	98–89	58–79	89–91	69–71	92–86	81–86
Crailsheim Merlins	101–92	78–73	85–91	83–99	93–88	79–82	—	84–83	77–81	92–84	102–93	106–87	119–102	69–78	82–95	91–103	76–68	85–86
Skyliners Frankfurt	83–100	107–113	61–79	61–88	59–61	89–84	72–88	—	78–75	97–93	82–94	92–80	71–65	74–83	70–77	101–83	82–97	86–77
BG Göttingen	95–79	100–89	96–95	60–95	80–79	68–81	92–79	82–88	—	71–98	87–81	87–80	96–93	83–75	106–97	92–95	101–108	82–74
Hamburg Towers	83–88	86–74	63–83	72–101	83–92	81–104	77–66	84–70	82–91	—	90–86	77–83	91–74	81–78	95–96	81–91	65–80	96–73
MLP Academics Heidelberg	109–100	107–101	68–94	74–91	95–79	74–81	93–82	93–90	84–74	83–87	—	86–100	109–91	83–87	102–94	78–75	96–106	93–82
Riesen Ludwigsburg	92–78	102–93	77–83	84–80	93–92	86–79	82–77	96–81	90–76	103–92	111–87	—	104–100	96–68	71–75	95–102	87–84	81–78
Mitteldeutscher BC	95–99	96–83	77–87	74–91	63–59	72–76	79–69	77–79	82–93	123–80	92–85	69–66	—	69–82	74–102	102–78	87–91	98–83
Bayern Munich	73–72	81–68	79–80	73–77	97–78	88–74	88–77	95–89	105–74	70–89	78–89	89–72	87–66	—	81–77	108–76	87–80	83–73
Baskets Oldenburg	104–95	76–72	81–89	76–87	83–73	83–81	94–86	87–79	93–75	94–58	75–99	93–80	108–68	88–76	—	99–90	81–73	77–79
Rostock Seawolves	86–97	99–70	70–104	62–77	110–95	81–96	86–79	77–99	94–85	82–76	84–91	92–87	79–77	65–78	73–80	—	85–80	72–76
Ratiopharm Ulm	107–87	88–73	83–110	92–101	95–87	92–99	91–80	94–79	84–93	112–78	92–84	93–76	128–122	59–77	97–84	116–86	—	84–91
s.Oliver Würzburg	73–79	96–89	76–79	71–96	73–77	77–74	87–78	88–72	74–92	90–56	90–71	86–89	113–117	49–67	78–82	97–87	62–28	—

Source: BBL
Legend: Blue = home team win; Red = away team win.
Matches with lighter background shading were decided after overtime.

== Playoffs ==
All three rounds of the playoffs were played in a best-of-five format, with the higher seeded team playing the first, third and fifth game at home

Quarterfinals
1	Telekom Baskets Bonn	3
8	Niners Chemnitz	0
4	Baskets Oldenburg	0
5	Riesen Ludwigsburg	3
3	Bayern Munich	3
6	BG Göttingen	0
2	Alba Berlin	1
7	Ratiopharm Ulm	3

Semifinals
1	Telekom Baskets Bonn	3
5	Riesen Ludwigsburg	0
3	Bayern Munich	0
7	Ratiopharm Ulm	3

Finals
1	Telekom Baskets Bonn	1
7	Ratiopharm Ulm	3

== Awards and statistics ==
=== Major award winners ===
The awards were announced on 3, 4 and 12 May 2023.

Award	Player	Club
Most Valuable Player	(North Macedonia) T. J. Shorts	Telekom Baskets Bonn
Finals MVP	(Brazil) Yago dos Santos	Ratiopharm Ulm
Top Scorer	(United States) DeWayne Russell	Baskets Oldenburg
Best Offensive Player	(United States) DeWayne Russell	Baskets Oldenburg
Best Defender	(United States) Selom Mawugbe	Rostock Seawolves
Most Effective Player International	(North Macedonia) T. J. Shorts	Telekom Baskets Bonn
Most Effective Player National	(Germany) Kevin Yebo	Niners Chemnitz
Best German Young Player	(Germany) Malte Delow	Alba Berlin
Coach of the Year	(Finland) Tuomas Iisalo	Telekom Baskets Bonn

=== Statistical leaders ===
Category	Player	Club	Average
Points per game	(United States) DeWayne Russell	Baskets Oldenburg	20.3
Rebounds per game	(United States) Derek Cooke	Skyliners Frankfurt	8.9
Assists per game	(United States) DeWayne Russell	Baskets Oldenburg	7.7
Steals per game	(United States) Kris Clyburn	Mitteldeutscher BC	2.0
Blocks per game	(United States) Selom Mawugbe	Rostock Seawolves	2.1
Efficiency per game	(North Macedonia) T. J. Shorts	Telekom Baskets Bonn	21.1

== German clubs in European competitions ==
Team	Competition	Result
Alba Berlin	EuroLeague	Regular season
Bayern Munich	EuroLeague	Regular season
Hamburg Towers	EuroCup	Eighthfinals
ratiopharm Ulm	EuroCup	Quarterfinals
Telekom Baskets Bonn	Champions League	Champion
Riesen Ludwigsburg	Champions League	Play-ins
Niners Chemnitz	Champions League	Qualifying
Brose Bamberg	Champions League	Qualifying
Crailsheim Merlins	FIBA Europe Cup	Second round
BG Göttingen	FIBA Europe Cup	Qualifying
Niners Chemnitz	FIBA Europe Cup	Second round
Brose Bamberg	FIBA Europe Cup	Quarterfinals
