= DeWayne Russell =

American basketball player

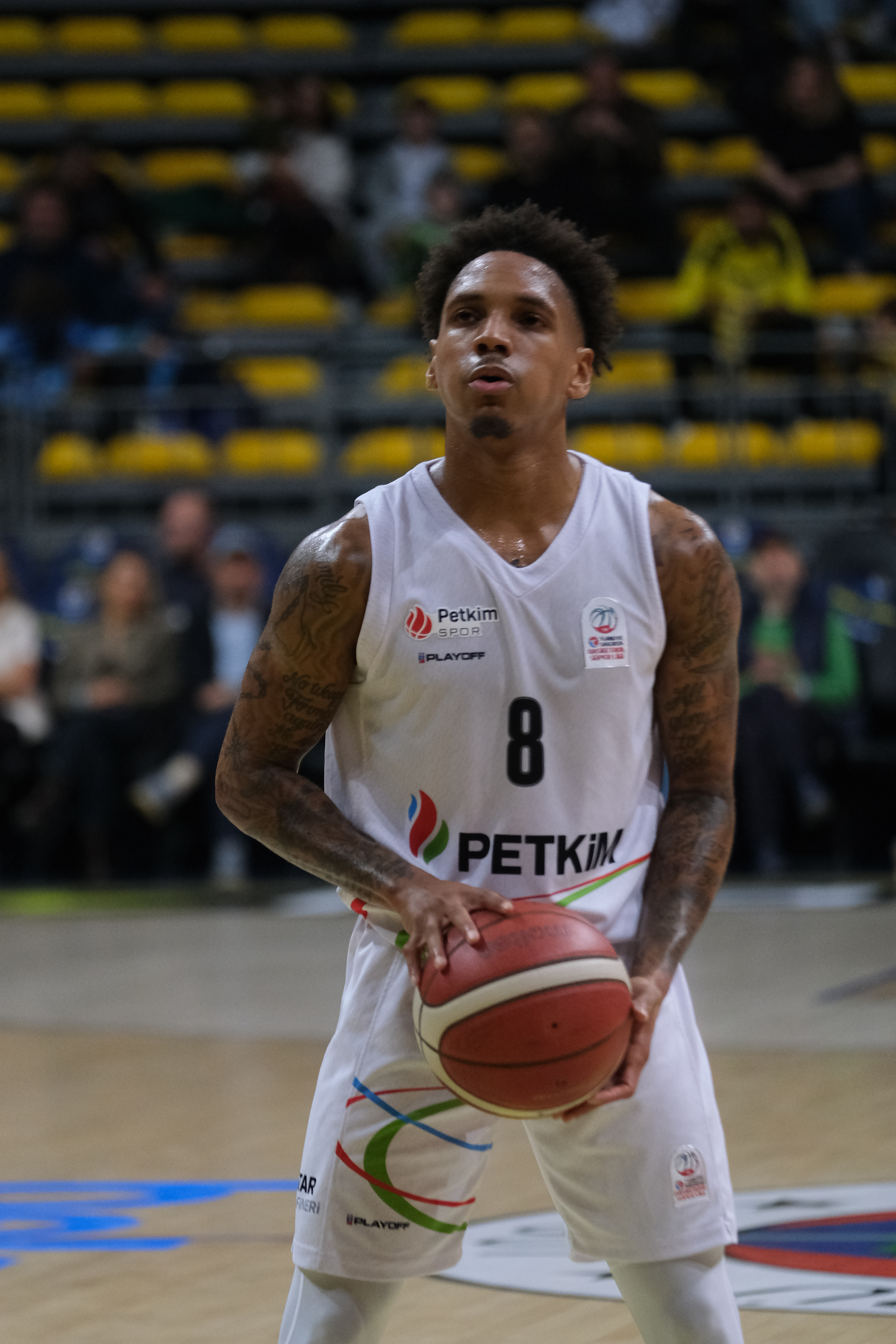
- DeWayne Russell in November 2024.

No. 4 – Universo Treviso Basket
- Position: Point guard
- League: Lega Basket Serie A

Personal information
- Born: February 10, 1994 (age 32) Philadelphia, Pennsylvania, U.S.
- Listed height: 1.80 m (5 ft 11 in)
- Listed weight: 70 kg (154 lb)

Career information
- High school: Peoria (Peoria, Arizona)
- College: Northern Arizona (2012–2013); Grand Canyon (2014–2017)
- NBA draft: 2017: undrafted
- Playing career: 2017–present

Career history
- 2017–2018: SLUC Nancy
- 2018–2020: Crailsheim Merlins
- 2020–2022: Universo Treviso Basket
- 2022–2024: EWE Baskets Oldenburg
- 2024–2025: Petkim Spor
- 2025–2026: CB Breogán
- 2026–present: Universo Treviso Basket

Career highlights
- Bundesliga Top Scorer (2023); 2× Bundesliga assists leader (2023, 2024); All-Bundesliga First Team (2023); First-team All-WAC (2017); Second-team All-WAC (2015); WAC All-Newcomer Team (2015)

DeWayne DaShawn Roberts Russell (born February 10, 1994) is an American professional basketball player for Universo Treviso Basket of the Italian Lega Basket Serie A (LBA).

== College career ==
Russell played his freshman season at Northern Arizona, averaging 14.4 points and 3.2 assists per game. Following the season he transferred to Grand Canyon. As a sophomore, he averaged 14.2 points and 3.9 assists per game, earning Second Team All-Western Athletic Conference (WAC) and WAC All-Newcomer Team honors. Russell averaged 9.7 points and 5.4 assists per game as a junior. On December 3, 2016, he scored a career-high 42 points, surpassing the program NCAA Division I record, in a 79–70 loss to Louisville. As a senior, Russell averaged 21.2 points and 5.4 assists per game, helping Grand Canyon achieve a 22–9 record. He was named to the First Team All-WAC and scored a single-season program Division I record 593 points.

== Professional career ==
On September 6, 2017, Russell signed his first professional contract with SLUC Nancy of the French LNB Pro B. He averaged 13.6 points and 5.5 assists per game. On October 8, 2018, Russell signed with Crailsheim Merlins of the German Basketball Bundesliga (BBL). He averaged 11.3 points and 4.2 assists per game. In his second regular season with the team, Russell averaged 14.5 points and 6.4 assists per game but was limited to one game at the 2020 BBL Final Tournament with an injury. On June 30, 2020, he signed with Universo Treviso of the Italian Lega Basket Serie A. Russell averaged 12.2 points, 5.7 assists and 2.7 rebounds per game. He re-signed with the team on June 17, 2021. On June 17, 2022, he signed with the EWE Baskets Oldenburg of the German Basketball Bundesliga, signing a two-year deal.

On June 20, 2024, he signed with Petkim Spor of the Basketbol Süper Ligi (BSL).

On June 29, 2025, he signed with CB Breogán of the Spanish Liga ACB.

On June 16, 2026, he signed with Universo Treviso Basket of the Italian Lega Basket Serie A (LBA) for a second stint.

== Personal life ==
His younger brother, Fatts Russell, played college basketball for Rhode Island and currently plays for U-BT Cluj-Napoca of the Romanian Liga Națională (LNBM), the ABA League and the EuroCup. He was guided by his uncle, Will Roberts, for much of his childhood.
