= Till Pape =

German basketball player (born 1997)

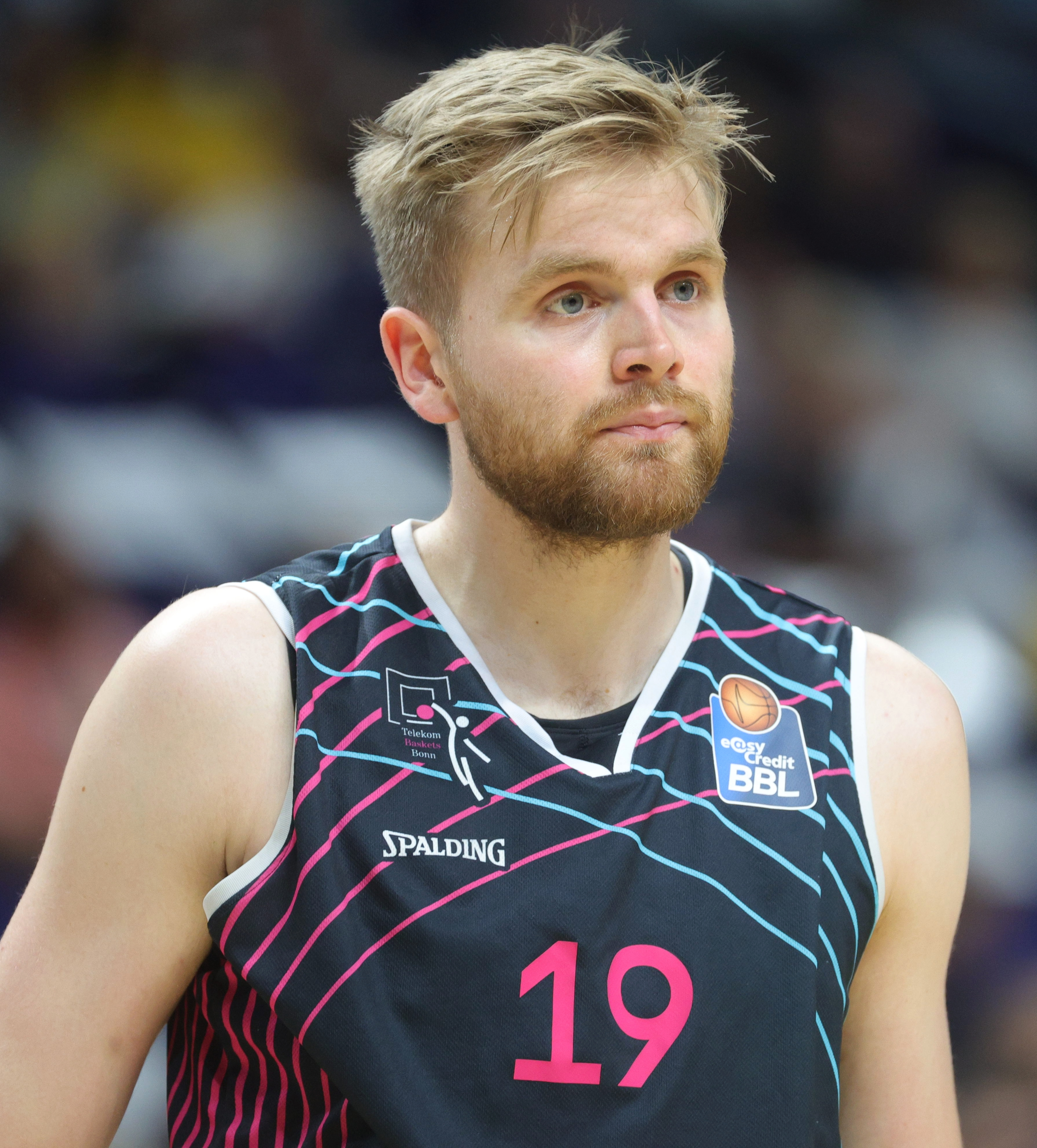

No. 19 – Fraport Skyliners
- Position: Power forward / center
- League: Basketball Bundesliga; EuroCup

Personal information
- Born: 10 December 1997 (age 28) Paderborn, Germany
- Listed height: 2.06 m (6 ft 9 in)
- Listed weight: 101 kg (223 lb)

Career history
- –2015: Paderborn Baskets
- 2015–2019: Ratiopharm Ulm
- 2015–2019: →Weißenhorn Youngstars
- 2019–2022: VfL Kirchheim Knights
- 2022–2023: BG Göttingen
- 2023–2025: Telekom Baskets Bonn
- 2025–present: Skyliners Frankfurt

Till Pape (born 10 December 1997) is a German professional basketball player for Skyliners Frankfurt of the Basketball Bundesliga (BBL) and the EuroCup. He plays the power forward and center position.

== Professional career ==
Pape began his club career in the youth system for the U6 side of Paderborn Baskets. In 2011, Pape helped Paderborn win the U14 German Championship, and in 2012, repeated the success with the U16 team. During the 2014–15 season in the 2. Basketball Bundesliga, he made brief appearances with the senior team.

Following Pape's graduation from high school, he moved to club Ratiopharm Ulm ahead of the 2015–16 season. Initially, Pape played for Ulm's youth team, and did not debut with their senior side until December 2016.

After the season, Pape signed on to play with Weißenhorn Youngstars, alongside his association with Ulm until 2019, when he signed with club VfL Kirchheim Knights going into the 2019–20 campaign.

Three years later, at the end of Pape's contract with Kirchheim in May 2022, he moved to BG Göttingen on a two-year deal in advance of the 2022–23 season. Following the Bundesliga season with Göttingen, Pape exercised a clause to terminate the second year in his contract with the club, to sign a two-year deal with Telekom Baskets Bonn prior to the 2023–24 season.

In May 2025, after Pape's deal expired with Bonn, he signed a two-year contract with club Skyliners Frankfurt ahead of the 2025–26 season.

== National team career ==
Pape's first opportunity to represent Germany came at the youth level, for the 2013 FIBA U16 European Championship. In Germany's eighth place finish at the event, he contributed with averages of 1.7 points and 2.3 rebounds per game. Two years later, Pape represented Germany in 3x3 basketball at the 2015 FIBA 3x3 U18 World Cup.

In November 2025, Pape was called up to the senior Germany national team for the first time. He made his debut scoring 14 points and grabbing four rebounds in a win over Cyprus, during a 2027 FIBA World Cup qualifier.

== Personal life ==
In 2020, Pape started studying medicine, and he began a doctoral thesis on the topic of minimally invasive robot-assisted pancreatic surgery.
