= Prentiss Hubb =

American basketball player

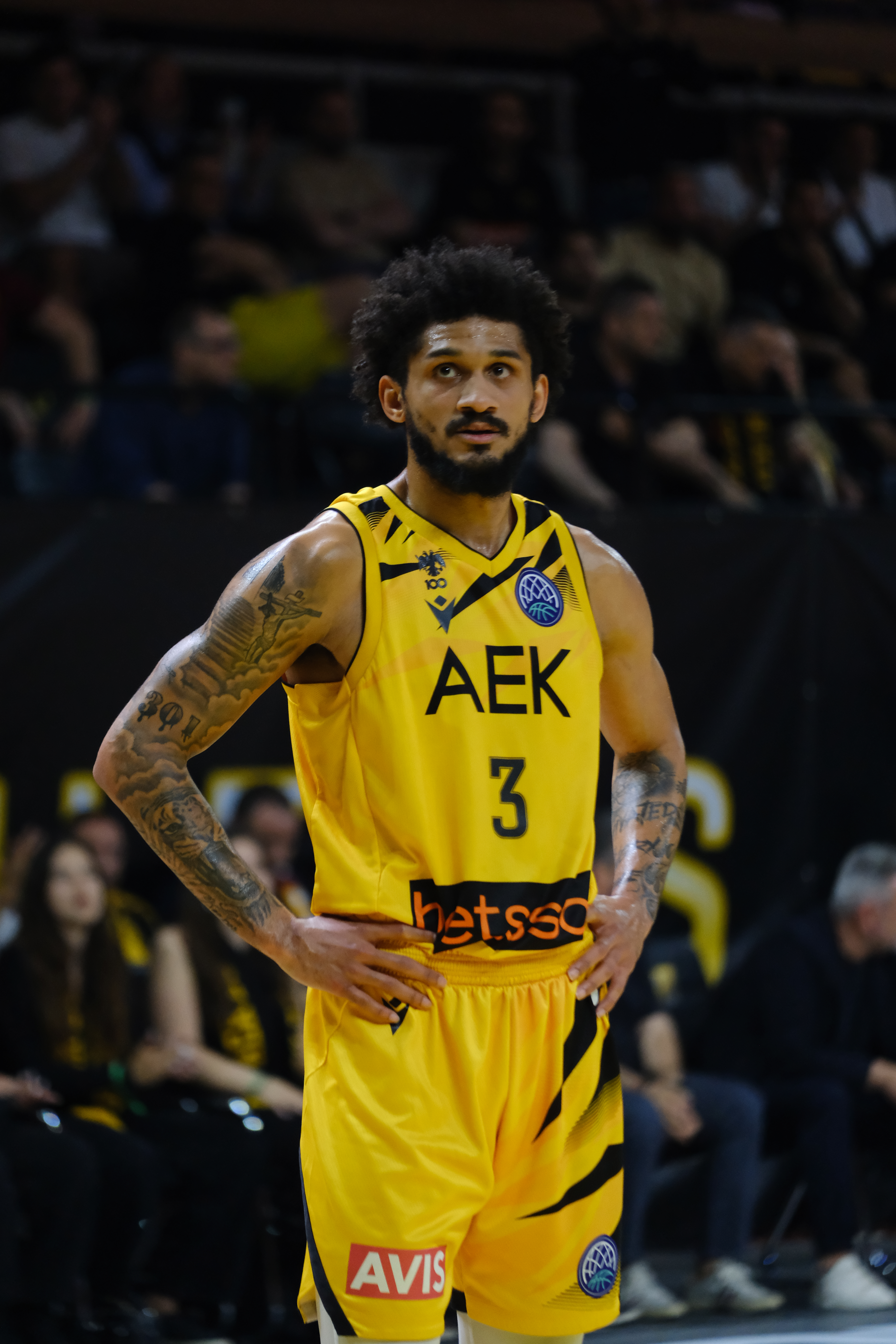
- Hubb in action with AEK Athens

No. 3 – Derthona Basket
- Position: Point guard
- League: LBA; EuroCup

Personal information
- Born: March 19, 1999 (age 27)
- Listed height: 6 ft 3 in (1.91 m)
- Listed weight: 176 lb (80 kg)

Career information
- High school: Gonzaga College (Washington, D.C.)
- College: Notre Dame (2018–2022)
- NBA draft: 2022: undrafted
- Playing career: 2022–present

Career history
- 2022–2023: Riesen Ludwigsburg
- 2023–2024: Dolomiti Energia Trento
- 2024–2025: AEK Athens
- 2025–present: Derthona Basket

Career highlights
- Third-team All-ACC (2021)

Prentiss Charles Hubb (born March 19, 1999) is an American professional basketball player for Derthona Basket of the Italian Lega Basket Serie A (LBA) and the EuroCup.

== High school career ==
Hubb attended Gonzaga College High School in Washington, D.C., where he was teammates with Chris Lykes. As a junior, he averaged 13.8 points and 4.5 assists per game. Hubb earned First Team All-Washington Catholic Athletic Conference (WCAC) honors and won the WCAC title for his second straight year. He missed his senior season with a torn anterior cruciate ligament in his right knee. Hubb competed for DC Premier on the Amateur Athletic Union circuit. A consensus four-star recruit, he committed to playing college basketball for Notre Dame over offers from Maryland, Villanova and Virginia.

== College career ==
As a freshman at Notre Dame, Hubb averaged 8.1 points and four assists per game. In his sophomore season, he averaged 12.1 points and 5.1 assists per game. On February 27, 2021, Hubb recorded a career-high 28 points, seven assists and five rebounds in a 94–90 loss to Boston College. He averaged 14.6 points and 5.9 assists per game as a junior, and was named to the Third Team All-Atlantic Coast Conference (ACC).

== Professional career ==
On August 8, 2023, he joined Dolomiti Energia Trento of the Lega Basket Serie A (LBA).

On July 27, 2024, Hubb signed with AEK Athens of the Greek Basket League.

On February 7, 2025, Hubb was named Basketball Champions League Player of the Week after scoring a career-high 30 points in a home win.

On July 5, 2025, he signed with Derthona Basket of the Italian Lega Basket Serie A (LBA).

== Personal life ==
Hubb is the son of Linda Henson-Hubb and Prentiss Hubb, along with a brother named Carlos and sister named Tiffany.

== Career statistics ==
Legend
| GP | Games played | GS | Games started | MPG | Minutes per game |
| FG% | Field goal percentage | 3P% | 3-point field goal percentage | FT% | Free throw percentage |
| RPG | Rebounds per game | APG | Assists per game | SPG | Steals per game |
| BPG | Blocks per game | PPG | Points per game | **Bold** | Career high |

=== College ===
| Year | Team | GP | GS | MPG | FG% | 3P% | FT% | RPG | APG | SPG | BPG | PPG |
|---|---|---|---|---|---|---|---|---|---|---|---|---|
| 2018–19 | Notre Dame | 33 | 29 | 33.6 | .324 | .262 | .673 | 3.1 | 4.0 | **1.0** | **.4** | 8.1 |
| 2019–20 | Notre Dame | 32 | **32** | 35.3 | .385 | **.344** | .712 | 2.4 | 5.1 | **1.0** | .1 | 12.1 |
| 2020–21 | Notre Dame | 26 | 25 | **36.9** | **.392** | .342 | **.780** | **3.2** | **5.8** | .7 | .3 | **14.6** |
| 2021–22 | Notre Dame | **35** | **32** | 33.7 | .366 | .313 | .733 | **3.2** | 4.0 | .7 | .2 | 8.9 |
| Career | | 126 | 118 | 34.7 | .369 | .318 | .726 | 3.0 | 4.6 | .9 | .2 | 10.7 |
