= 2023 Basketball Champions League Final Four =

European club basketball tournament

- Season: 2022–23 season

Tournament details
- Arena: Palacio de Deportes José María Martín Carpena; Málaga, Spain
- Dates: 12–14 May 2023

Final positions
- Champions: (Germany) Telekom Baskets Bonn (1st title)
- Runners-up: (Israel) Hapoel Jerusalem
- Third place: (Spain) Lenovo Tenerife
- Fourth place: (Spain) Unicaja

Awards and statistics
- MVP: T. J. Shorts (Telekom Baskets Bonn)
- Top scorer(s): T. J. Shorts (Telekom Baskets Bonn) – 50 points
- Attendance: 42,741 (10,683 per game)

The 2023 Basketball Champions League (BCL) Final Four was the 7th Basketball Champions League tournament and the 5th in the format of Final Four. It was the concluding phase of the 2022–23 Basketball Champions League season.

It was the first time the tournament was held in Málaga. The championship was won by Telekom Baskets Bonn, who became the first German BCL champions. They defeated runners-up Hapoel Jerusalem in the final. Lenovo Tenerife finished in third place, Unicaja in fourth place.

Telekom Baskets guard T. J. Shorts won the Final Four MVP award, becoming the first player in league history to win both the season MVP and Final Four MVP award in the same season. He scored 50 points in his two games, setting a new record for most points by a player, formerly held by Kevin Punter (2018). Shorts also set a record for most points in both a final four game by scoring 29 points in the final.

== Venue ==
The Palacio de Deportes José María Martín Carpena hosted the final tournament for the first time.

Málaga	2023 Basketball Champions League Final Four (Europe)
Palacio de Deportes José María Martín Carpena	2023 Basketball Champions League Final Four (Europe)
Capacity: 11,300	2023 Basketball Champions League Final Four (Europe)

== Teams ==
Team	Previous final tournament appearances (Note: Both Final Four and Final Eight tournaments.)
(Spain) Lenovo Tenerife	5 (2017, 2019, 2020, 2021, 2022)
(Israel) Hapoel Jerusalem	1 (2020)
(Germany) Telekom Baskets Bonn	0 (debut)
(Spain) Unicaja	0 (debut)

== Draw ==
The 2023 Basketball Champions League Final Four was drawn on April 25, 2023, at Museo Picasso in Malaga.

== Bracket ==
Semifinals
12 May
(Spain) Unicaja	67
(Germany) Telekom Baskets Bonn	69
12 May
(Spain) Lenovo Tenerife	68
(Israel) Hapoel Jerusalem	69

Final
14 May
(Germany) Telekom Baskets Bonn	77
(Israel) Hapoel Jerusalem	70
Third place game
14 May
(Spain) Unicaja	79
(Spain) Lenovo Tenerife	84

== Semifinals ==
12 May 2023	Lenovo Tenerife (Spain)	68–69	(Israel) Hapoel Jerusalem	Málaga
17:30	Scoring by quarter: 18–15, 12–19, 12–18, 26–17
	Pts: Huertas 20; Rebs: Shermadini 6 Asts: Salin 4 Eff: Huertas 25	Boxscore	Pts: Carrington 19; Rebs: Hankins 6 Asts: Smith 5 Eff: Vene 17	Arena: Palacio de Deportes José María Martín Carpena; Attendance: 11,000; Referees: Manuel Mazzoni, Ademir Zurapović, Martins Kozlovskis

12 May 2023	Unicaja (Spain)	67–69	(Germany) Telekom Baskets Bonn	Málaga
20:30	Scoring by quarter: 22–22, 9–19, 19–16, 17–12
	Pts: three players 12; Rebs: Ejim 8 Asts: Perry 7 Eff: Ejim 17	Boxscore	Pts: Shorts 21; Rebs: Ward 7 Asts: Shorts 7 Eff: Shorts 17	Arena: Palacio de Deportes José María Martín Carpena; Attendance: 11,000; Referees: Yohan Rosso, Wojciech Liszka, Boris Krejić

== Third place game ==
14 May 2023	Unicaja (Spain)	79–84	(Spain) Lenovo Tenerife	Málaga
17:30	Scoring by quarter: 29–31, 9–22, 14–13, 27–18
	Pts: Perry 22; Rebs: Kravish 8 Asts: Perry 3 Eff: Perry 22	Boxscore	Pts: Shermadini, Fernández 12; Rebs: Doornekamp 6 Asts: Huertas 8 Eff: Shermadini 17	Arena: Palacio de Deportes José María Martín Carpena; Attendance: 8,941; Referees: Wojciech Liszka, Gatis Salins, Kerem Baki

== Final ==
14 May 2023	Telekom Baskets Bonn (Germany)	77–70	(Israel) Hapoel Jerusalem	Málaga
20:00	Scoring by quarter: 14–7, 23–21, 20–27, 20–15
	Pts: Shorts 29; Rebs: Kratzer, Malcolm 6 Asts: Shorts 3 Eff: Shorts 23	Boxscore	Pts: Randolph 27; Rebs: Hankins 10; Asts: Smith 5 Eff: Randolph 22	Arena: Palacio de Deportes José María Martín Carpena; Attendance: 11,800; Referees: Manuel Mazzoni, Yohan Rosso, Boris Krejić

== See also ==
- 2023 EuroLeague Final Four
- 2023 EuroCup Final
- 2023 FIBA Europe Cup Finals
