= 2022–23 Basketball Champions League =

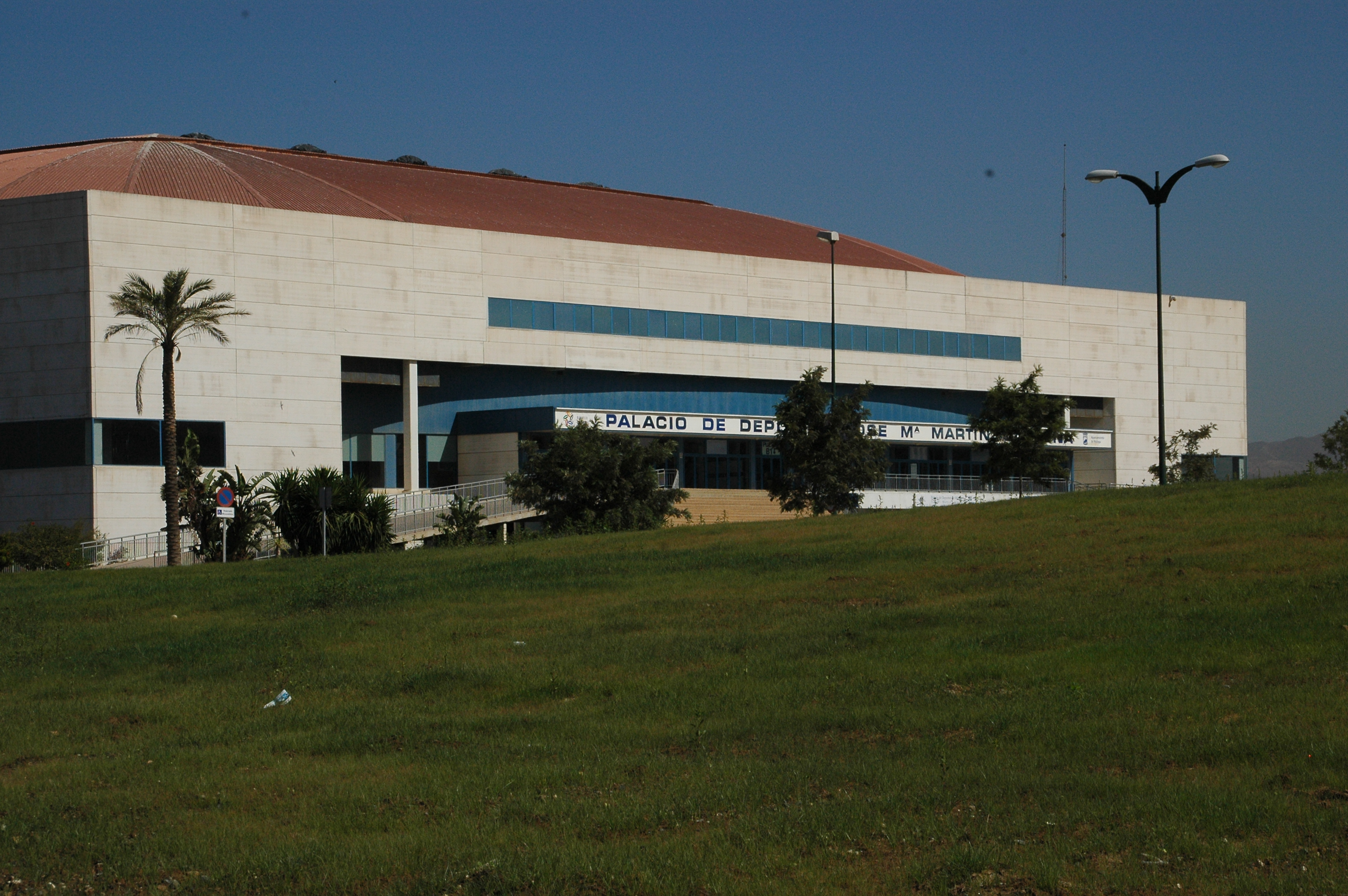
- The José María Martín Carpena Arena hosted the Final Four
- Season: 2022–23
- Dates: Qualifying: 21–25 September 2022; Competition proper: 3 October 2022 – 14 May 2023
- Teams: Competition proper: 32; Total: 52 (from 29 countries)

Regular season
- Season MVP: T. J. Shorts (Bonn)

Final Four
- Champions: (Germany) Telekom Baskets Bonn (1st title)
- Runners-up: (Israel) Hapoel Jerusalem
- Third place: (Spain) Lenovo Tenerife
- Fourth place: (Spain) Unicaja Malaga
- Final Four MVP: T. J. Shorts (Bonn)

Awards
- Best Coach: Tuomas Iisalo (Bonn)
- Best Young Player: Sadık Emir Kabaca (Galatasaray)

Statistical leaders
Points	Marcus Foster (Vilnius)	20.6
Rebounds	Akil Mitchell (AEK)	8.5
Assists	Joe Ragland (Holon)	9.5

The 2022–23 Basketball Champions League was the 7th season of the Basketball Champions League (BCL), the premier European professional basketball competition for clubs launched by FIBA. The season began on 3 October 2022 and ended 14 May 2023 with the championship game.

Telekom Baskets Bonn defeated Hapoel Jerusalem in the final of the Final Four, which was played in the Palacio de Deportes José María Martín Carpena in Málaga. Bonn became the first German club to win the Basketball Champions League title. As the winners, Bonn automatically qualified for the 2023 FIBA Intercontinental Cup in Singapore.

Lenovo Tenerife were the defending champions, but lost in the semi-finals by Hapoel Jerusalem.

== Team allocation ==
A total of 52 teams from 29 countries will participate in the 2022–23 Basketball Champions League. 18 of them were domestic champions in the previous season.

=== Teams ===
League positions after eventual playoffs of the previous season shown in parentheses. The Basketball Champions League rankings are taken into consideration.

- TH: Champions League title holders
- FEC: FIBA Europe Cup champions.
- AV: Allocated vacancy^{NOTE}

NOTE: According to BCL rankings, National Federations of Czech Republic, Hungary and Russia (banned from competition) should had two berths in Regular season, as well as one berth for the champion of Ukraine (BC Prometey decided to play Eurocup). Their places were allocated to the teams from Turkey, France, Greece, Israel and Poland.

Qualified teams for 2022–23 Basketball Champions League (by entry round)
Regular season
(Spain) Lenovo Tenerife (6th)^{TH}	(Turkey) Pınar Karşıyaka (7th)^{AV}	(Israel) Hapoel Holon (1st)	(Belgium) Filou Oostende (1st)
(Spain) Baxi Manresa (7th)	(France) JDA Dijon (3rd)	(Israel) Bnei Herzliya (2nd)	(Bosnia and Herzegovina) Igokea m:tel (1st)
(Spain) Surne Bilbao Basket (9th)	(France) Limoges CSP (6th)	(Israel) Hapoel Bank Yahav Jerusalem (3rd)^{AV}	(Czech Republic) ERA Nymburk (1st)
(Spain) UCAM Murcia (10th)	(France) SIG Strasbourg (7th)^{AV}	(Germany) Telekom Baskets Bonn (3rd)	(Hungary) Falco Szombathely (1st)
(Turkey) Galatasaray Nef (3rd)	(Greece) AEK (6th)	(Germany) MHP Riesen Ludwigsburg (4th)	(Latvia) VEF Rīga (1st)
(Turkey) Darüşşafaka Lassa (4th)	(Greece) Peristeri (8th)	(Italy) Dinamo Banco di Sardegna Sassari (4th)	(Lithuania) Rytas (1st)
(Turkey) Bahçeşehir Koleji (6th)^{FEC}	(Greece) PAOK mateco (9th)^{AV}	(Italy) Unahotels Reggio Emilia (7th)	(Poland) Legia Warsaw (2nd)^{AV}
Qualifying rounds
(Germany) Niners Chemnitz (6th)	(Czech Republic) Opava (2nd)	(Kosovo) Golden Eagle Ylli (1st)	(Serbia) FMP Meridian (2nd)
(Germany) Brose Bamberg (8th)	(Denmark) Bakken Bears (1st)	(Lithuania) Šiauliai (4th)	(Slovakia) Patrioti Levice (1st)
(Spain) Río Breogán (11th)	(Estonia) Pärnu Sadam (1st)	(Netherlands) Heroes Den Bosch (1st)	(Sweden) Norrköping Dolphins (1st)
(Spain) Unicaja (12th)	(Finland) Karhu (1st)	(North Macedonia) TFT Skopje (4th)	(Switzerland) Fribourg Olympic (1st)
(Austria) Swans Gmunden (2nd)	(United Kingdom) Leicester Riders (1st)	(Portugal) Benfica (1st)	(Turkey) Tofaş (9th)
(Cyprus) Keravnos (1st)	(Hungary) Egis Körmend (2nd)	(Romania) CSO Voluntari (2nd)	(Ukraine) Budivelnyk (Abd-2nd)

== Referees ==
A total of 60 officials set to work on the 2022–23 season in Basketball Champions League:

Referees of the 2022−23 season
(Belgium) Geert Jacobs; (Bosnia and Herzegovina) Ademir Zurapović; (Bulgaria) Martin Horozov; (Bulgaria) Ventsislav Velikov; (Croatia) Franko Gracin; (Croatia) Josip Jurčević; (Croatia) Martin Vulić; (Cyprus) Ilias Kounelles; (Czech Republic) Ivor Matějek; (Estonia) Mihkel Männiste; (France) Alexandre Deman; (France) Nicolas Maestre; (France) Valentin Oliot; (France) Yohan Rosso; (Germany) Carsten Straube; (Greece) Anastasios Kardaris; (Greece) Georgios Poursanidis; (Hungary) Péter Praksch; (Israel) Erez Gurion; (Israel) Ofer Manheim	(Italy) Beniamino Attard; (Italy) Lorenzo Baldini; (Italy) Saverio Lanzarini; (Italy) Manuel Mazzoni; (Latvia) Andris Aunkrogers; (Latvia) Mārtiņš Kozlovskis; (Latvia) Oskars Lucis; (Latvia) Gatis Saliņš; (Lithuania) Gvidas Gedvilas; (Lithuania) Tomas Jasevičius; (Lithuania) Gintaras Mačiulis; (Montenegro) Zdravko Rutešić; (Montenegro) Radomir Vojinović; (North Macedonia) Igor Mitrovski; (Norway) Gizella Viola Györgyi; (Poland) Wojciech Liszka; (Poland) Michał Proc; (Poland) Dariusz Zapolski; (Portugal) Paulo Marques; (Romania) Marius Ciulin	(Serbia) Aleksandar Glišić; (Serbia) Vladimir Jevtović; (Serbia) Siniša Prpa; (Slovakia) Marek Kúkelčík; (Slovakia) Zdenko Tomašovič; (Slovenia) Boris Krejić; (Slovenia) Blaž Zupančič; (Spain) Fernando Calatrava; (Spain) Luis Castillo; (Spain) Antonio Conde; (Spain) Ariadna Chueca; (Spain) Sergio Manuel; (Spain) Alberto Sánchez; (Turkey) Kerem Baki; (Turkey) Mehmet Karabilecen; (Turkey) Can Mavisu; (Turkey) Özlem Yalman; (Turkey) Yener Yılmaz; (Turkey) Zafer Yılmaz; (Ukraine) Sergiy Zashchuk

== Schedule ==
The schedule of the competition will be as follows.

Schedule for 2022–23 Basketball Champions League
Phase	Round		Draw date	First leg	Second leg	Third leg
Qualifying rounds	First qualifying round		7 July 2022	21 September 2022		
Qualifying rounds	Second qualifying round		7 July 2022	23 September 2022		
Qualifying rounds	Third qualifying round		7 July 2022	25 September 2022		
Regular season	Round 1		7 July 2022	3–5 October 2022		
Regular season	Round 2	Groups A, B, C, F	7 July 2022	11–12 October 2022		
Regular season	Round 2	Groups D, E, G, H	7 July 2022	18–19 October 2022		
Regular season	Round 3	Groups A, B, C, F	7 July 2022	25–26 October 2022		
Regular season	Round 3	Groups D, E, G, H	7 July 2022	1–2 November 2022		
Regular season	Round 4	Groups A, B, C, F	7 July 2022	22–23 November 2022		
Regular season	Round 4	Groups D, E, G, H	7 July 2022	29–30 November 2022		
Regular season	Round 5	Groups A, B, C, F	7 July 2022	6–7 December 2022		
Regular season	Round 5	Groups D, E, G, H	7 July 2022	13–14 December 2022		
Regular season	Round 6		7 July 2022	20–21 December 2022		
Play-ins			7 July 2022	3–4 January 2023	10–11 January 2023	17–18 January 2023
Round of 16	Round 1		7 July 2022	24–25 January 2023		
Round of 16	Round 2		7 July 2022	31 January–1 February 2023		
Round of 16	Round 3		7 July 2022	7–8 February 2023		
Round of 16	Round 4		7 July 2022	7–8 March 2023		
Round of 16	Round 5		7 July 2022	14–15 March 2023		
Round of 16	Round 6		7 July 2022	21–22 March 2023		
Play-offs	Quarter-finals		24 March 2023	4–5 April 2023	11–12 April 2023	18–19 April 2023
Final Four	Semi-finals		25 April 2023	12 May 2023		
Final Four	Final		25 April 2023	14 May 2023		

== Qualifying rounds ==
=== Draw ===
The 24 teams will be divided into six pots based firstly on the competition's club ranking and, for clubs that have not yet participated in the competition, on the country ranking. For the quarterfinals round of qualifications, teams from Pot 6 will be drawn against teams from Pot 3, and teams from Pot 4 will face teams from Pot 5. Clubs from Pot 1 and 2 will be seeded, and will enter directly in the semifinals stage of qualifications and will face the winners from the quarterfinals round. The winners of the semifinals stage will face each other in the finals of qualifications. The four winners of the finals will then qualify for the regular season and join the 28 directly qualified teams in the main draw. The rest of the teams will be demoted, if they apply, to the FIBA Europe Cup.

Pot 1
Team	Pts
(Turkey) Tofaş	57
(Germany) Brose Bamberg	51
(Spain) Unicaja	29
(Denmark) Bakken Bears	17

Pot 4
Team	Pts
(Romania) CSO Voluntari	40.00^{†}
(Lithuania) Šiauliai	39.50^{†}
(Ukraine) Budivelnyk Kyiv	26.00^{†}
(Estonia) Pärnu Sadam	11.00^{†}

Pot 2
Team	Pts
(Switzerland) Fribourg Olympic	7
(Cyprus) Keravnos	7
(Czech Republic) Opava	2
(Finland) Karhu	2

Pot 5
Team	Pts
(Netherlands) Heroes Den Bosch	5.00^{†}
(United Kingdom) Leicester Riders	2.00^{†}
(Sweden) Norrköping Dolphins	2.00^{†}
(Austria) Swans Gmunden	2.00^{†}

Pot 3
Team	Pts
(Portugal) Benfica	2
(Spain) Río Breogán	107.50^{†}
(Germany) Niners Chemnitz	67.00^{†}
(Hungary) Körmend	58.00^{†}

Pot 6
Team	Pts
(Kosovo) Golden Eagle Ylli	1.00^{†}
(Slovakia) Patrioti Levice	1.00^{†}
(Serbia) FMP Meridian	0^{†}
(North Macedonia) TFT Skopje	0^{†}

Notes

^† Indicates teams with no club points, therefore using the country points as a tiebreaker.

==== Qualification Group A (Skopje, North Macedonia) ====
Quarterfinals
21 September
(United Kingdom) Leicester Riders	61
(Romania) Voluntari	70
21 September
(North Macedonia) TFT Skopje	77
(Germany) Niners Chemnitz	96

Semifinals
23 September
(Turkey) Tofaş	68
(Romania) Voluntari	57
23 September
(Switzerland) Fribourg Olympic	70
(Germany) Niners Chemnitz	93

Final
25 September
(Turkey) Tofaş	82
(Germany) Niners Chemnitz	78

==== Qualification Group B (Málaga, Spain) ====
Quarterfinals
21 September
(Netherlands) Heroes Den Bosch	85
(Lithuania) Šiauliai	73
21 September
(Slovakia) Patrioti Levice	79
(Hungary) Körmend	70

Semifinals
23 September
(Spain) Unicaja Málaga	114
(Netherlands) Heroes Den Bosch	58
23 September
(Finland) Karhu	57
(Slovakia) Patrioti Levice	81

Final
25 September
(Spain) Unicaja Málaga	91
(Slovakia) Patrioti Levice	73

==== Qualification Group C (Lisbon, Portugal) ====
Quarterfinals
21 September
(Sweden) Norrköping Dolphins	51
(Ukraine) Budivelnyk	87
21 September
(Kosovo) Golden Eagles Ylli	67
(Portugal) Benfica	92

Semifinals
23 September
(Germany) Brose Bamberg	97
(Ukraine) Budivelnyk	94
23 September
(Cyprus) Keravnos	65
(Portugal) Benfica	73

Final
25 September
(Germany) Brose Bamberg	73
(Portugal) Benfica	87

==== Qualification Group D (Belgrade, Serbia) ====
Quarterfinals
21 September
(Austria) Swans Gmunden	82
(Estonia) Pärnu	80
21 September
(Serbia) FMP Meridian	76
(Spain) Río Breogán	64

Semifinals
23 September
(Denmark) Bakken Bears	83
(Austria) Swans Gmunden	65
23 September
(Czech Republic) Opava	76
(Serbia) FMP Meridian	92

Final
25 September
(Denmark) Bakken Bears	88
(Serbia) FMP Meridian	82

== Regular season ==
=== Draw ===
The 28 teams that entered in the regular season directly were divided into four pots based firstly on the club ranking and, for clubs that have not yet participated in the competition, on the country ranking. The country protection rule will apply for the stage of the draw. Clubs cannot be drawn in groups with other clubs from the same country.

Pot 1
Team	Pts
(Spain) Lenovo Tenerife	123
(Israel) Hapoel Holon	91
(Czech Republic) ERA Nymburk	83
(France) JDA Dijon	81
(France) SIG Strasbourg	78
(Greece) AEK	75
(Spain) Baxi Manresa	67
(Israel) Hapoel Jerusalem	62

Pot 2
Team	Pts
(Turkey) Pınar Karşıyaka	59
(Hungary) Falco Szombathely	58
(Italy) Dinamo Sassari	56
(Belgium) Filou Oostende	55
(Germany) MHP Riesen Ludwigsburg	44
(Bosnia and Herzegovina) Igokea	41
(Latvia) VEF Rīga	37
(Lithuania) Rytas	37

Pot 3
Team	Pts
(Turkey) Galatasaray Nef	35
(Greece) Peristeri	34
(Turkey) Darüşşafaka Lassa	32
(Greece) PAOK	27
(Germany) Telekom Baskets Bonn	21
(France) Limoges CSP	11
(Spain) Surne Bilbao Basket	11
(Spain) UCAM Murcia	107.50^{†}

Pot 4
Team	Pts
(Poland) Legia Warsaw	2
(Turkey) Bahçeşehir Koleji	67.15^{†}
(Israel) Bnei Herzliya	60.17^{†}
(Italy) Reggiana	51.33^{†}
(Turkey) Tofaş (Winner QF–T1)
(Spain) Unicaja Málaga (Winner QF–T2)
(Portugal) Benfica (Winner QF–T3)
(Denmark) Bakken Bears (Winner QF–T4)

Notes

^† Indicates teams with no club points, therefor using the country points as a tiebreaker.

=== Group A ===
Pos	Team	Pld	W	L	PF	PA	PD	Pts	Qualification	SIG	UCM	TOF	FAL
1	(France) SIG Strasbourg	6	4	2	485	481	+4	10	Advance to round of 16	—	82–70	94–89	81–78
2	(Spain) UCAM Murcia	6	4	2	487	487	0	10	Advance to play-ins	80–78	—	75–72	81–74
3	(Turkey) Tofaş	6	2	4	480	462	+18	8	Advance to play-ins	75–79	77–87	—	90–63
4	(Hungary) Falco Szombathely	6	2	4	472	494	−22	8		89–71	104–94	64–77	—

Source: Groups Standings
Legend: Blue = home team win; Red = away team win.

=== Group B ===
Pos	Team	Pld	W	L	PF	PA	PD	Pts	Qualification	BON	AEK	KAR	REG
1	(Germany) Telekom Baskets Bonn	6	5	1	499	443	+56	11	Advance to round of 16	—	80–72	83–71	84–88
2	(Greece) AEK	6	3	3	458	448	+10	9	Advance to play-ins	66–73	—	80–72	68–59
3	(Turkey) Pınar Karşıyaka	6	2	4	467	490	−23	8	Advance to play-ins	80–89	91–88	—	83–76
4	(Italy) Reggiana	6	2	4	436	479	−43	8		66–90	73–84	74–70	—

Source: Groups Standings
Legend: Blue = home team win; Red = away team win.

=== Group C ===
Pos	Team	Pld	W	L	PF	PA	PD	Pts	Qualification	GAL	HOL	OOS	LEG
1	(Turkey) Galatasaray Nef	6	4	2	514	473	+41	10	Advance to round of 16	—	88–75	85–91	86–71
2	(Israel) Hapoel Holon	6	4	2	516	499	+17	10	Advance to play-ins	82–73	—	88–83	101–79
3	(Belgium) Filou Oostende	6	3	3	481	481	0	9	Advance to play-ins	78–92	95–86	—	66–71
4	(Poland) Legia Warsaw	6	1	5	437	495	−58	7		76–90	81–84	59–68	—

Source: Groups Standings
Legend: Blue = home team win; Red = away team win.

=== Group D ===
Pos	Team	Pld	W	L	PF	PA	PD	Pts	Qualification	SBB	BAH	IGO	NYM
1	(Spain) Surne Bilbao Basket	6	4	2	477	425	+52	10	Advance to round of 16	—	80–66	81–84	71–81
2	(Turkey) Bahçeşehir Koleji	6	3	3	437	470	−33	9	Advance to play-ins	60–92	—	70–67	88–80
3	(Bosnia and Herzegovina) Igokea	6	3	3	467	456	+11	9	Advance to play-ins	80–85	72–77	—	91–74
4	(Czech Republic) ERA Nymburk	6	2	4	437	467	−30	8		54–68	79–76	69–73	—

Source: Groups Standings
Legend: Blue = home team win; Red = away team win.

=== Group E ===
Pos	Team	Pld	W	L	PF	PA	PD	Pts	Qualification	JER	LUD	DAR	BAK
1	(Israel) Hapoel Jerusalem	6	5	1	480	448	+32	11	Advance to round of 16	—	71–80	69–67	89–80
2	(Germany) MHP Riesen Ludwigsburg	6	4	2	507	449	+58	10	Advance to play-ins	81–87	—	63–77	99–58
3	(Turkey) Darüşşafaka	6	2	4	429	448	−19	8	Advance to play-ins	69–92	70–90	—	80–66
4	(Denmark) Bakken Bears	6	1	5	429	500	−71	7		71–72	86–94	68–66	—

Source: Groups Standings
Legend: Blue = home team win; Red = away team win.

=== Group F ===
Pos	Team	Pld	W	L	PF	PA	PD	Pts	Qualification	BAX	BEN	CSP	VEF
1	(Spain) Baxi Manresa	6	4	2	502	470	+32	10	Advance to round of 16	—	82–92	77–88	88–59
2	(Portugal) Benfica	6	4	2	470	472	−2	10	Advance to play-ins	78–97	—	59–79	84–71
3	(France) Limoges CSP	6	3	3	438	404	+34	9	Advance to play-ins	73–76	67–68	—	80–53
4	(Latvia) VEF Rīga	6	1	5	410	474	−64	7		80–82	76–89	71–51	—

Source: Groups Standings
Legend: Blue = home team win; Red = away team win.

=== Group G ===
Pos	Team	Pld	W	L	PF	PA	PD	Pts	Qualification	UNI	JDA	POK	DIN
1	(Spain) Unicaja Málaga	6	5	1	513	454	+59	11	Advance to round of 16	—	88–68	77–63	82–92
2	(France) JDA Dijon	6	3	3	450	471	−21	9	Advance to play-ins	70–91	—	69–74	88–80
3	(Greece) PAOK	6	2	4	454	454	0	8	Advance to play-ins	85–88	66–70	—	88–68
4	(Italy) Dinamo Sassari	6	2	4	470	508	−38	8		76–87	72–85	82–78	—

Source: Groups Standings
Legend: Blue = home team win; Red = away team win.

=== Group H ===
Pos	Team	Pld	W	L	PF	PA	PD	Pts	Qualification	TFE	RYT	PER	HER
1	(Spain) Lenovo Tenerife	6	4	2	512	427	+85	10	Advance to round of 16	—	89–74	86–60	83–63
2	(Lithuania) Rytas	6	3	3	505	493	+12	9	Advance to play-ins	85–78	—	89–64	90–101
3	(Greece) Peristeri	6	3	3	459	495	−36	9	Advance to play-ins	88–81	71–82	—	86–70
4	(Israel) Bnei Herzliya	6	2	4	468	529	−61	8		57–95	90–85	87–90	—

Source: Groups Standings
Legend: Blue = home team win; Red = away team win.

== Play-ins ==
The Play-ins took place from January 3 to 18. The teams classified in second and third place in their respective groups of Basketball Champions League, went to the Play-ins. Winners advanced to the round of 16. The first legs were played on 3–4 January, the second legs on 10–11 January. Eventual third legs was played on 17–18 January.

Team 1	Series	Team 2	Game 1	Game 2	Game 3
UCAM Murcia (Spain)	2–0	(Turkey) Pınar Karşıyaka	97–92	96–89	—
AEK (Greece)	2–0	(Turkey) Tofaş	73–70	85–82	—
Hapoel Holon (Israel)	2–0	(Bosnia and Herzegovina) Igokea	103–79	91–80	—
Bahçeşehir Koleji (Turkey)	2–1	(Belgium) Filou Oostende	72–76	77–64	87–81
MHP Riesen Ludwigsburg (Germany)	1–2	(France) Limoges CSP	85–81	62–82	94–96
Benfica (Portugal)	0–2	(Turkey) Darüşşafaka Lassa	76–89	72–83	—
JDA Dijon (France)	2–1	(Greece) Peristeri	89–80	88–92	89–82
Rytas (Lithuania)	2–1	(Greece) PAOK	85–62	78–81	82–63

== Round of 16 ==
The Round of 16 will take place from January 23 until March 20, 2023. The groups will be formed by the winners of each Regular Season Group and by eight Play-Ins winners. The 16 teams were divided in 4 groups, 4 teams each. The first two of each groups advanced to the quarter-finals.

=== Group I ===
Pos	Team	Pld	W	L	PF	PA	PD	Pts	Qualification	JER	SIG	JDA	HOL
1	(Israel) Hapoel Jerusalem	6	5	1	444	419	+25	11	Advance to quarter-finals	—	81–80	77–84	77–65
2	(France) SIG Strasbourg	6	4	2	506	466	+40	10	Advance to quarter-finals	63–71	—	86–67	112–110
3	(France) JDA Dijon	6	2	4	457	490	−33	8		64–73	72–85	—	89–81
4	(Israel) Hapoel Holon	6	1	5	472	504	−32	7		63–65	65–80	88–81	—

Source: Round of 16 Standings
Legend: Blue = home team win; Red = away team win.

=== Group J ===
Pos	Team	Pld	W	L	PF	PA	PD	Pts	Qualification	BON	BAX	RYT	BAH
1	(Germany) Telekom Baskets Bonn	6	6	0	518	439	+79	12	Advance to quarter-finals	—	85–75	99–72	74–68
2	(Spain) Baxi Manresa	6	3	3	488	485	+3	9	Advance to quarter-finals	69–87	—	82–69	90–72
3	(Lithuania) Rytas	6	3	3	503	519	−16	9		79–86	96–95	—	95–88
4	(Turkey) Bahçeşehir Koleji	6	0	6	449	515	−66	6		76–87	76–77	69–92	—

Source: Round of 16 Standings
Legend: Blue = home team win; Red = away team win.

=== Group K ===
Pos	Team	Pld	W	L	PF	PA	PD	Pts	Qualification	UNI	AEK	GAL	CSP
1	(Spain) Unicaja Málaga	6	5	1	494	434	+60	11	Advance to quarter-finals	—	88–66	81–76	99–88
2	(Greece) AEK	6	4	2	455	447	+8	10	Advance to quarter-finals	65–75	—	92–78	82–72
3	(Turkey) Galatasaray Nef	6	2	4	457	463	−6	8		72–67	71–81	—	100–73
4	(France) Limoges CSP	6	1	5	432	494	−62	7		67–84	63–69	69–60	—

Source: Round of 16 Standings
Legend: Blue = home team win; Red = away team win.

=== Group L ===
Pos	Team	Pld	W	L	PF	PA	PD	Pts	Qualification	TFE	UCM	DAR	SBB
1	(Spain) Lenovo Tenerife	6	5	1	459	415	+44	11	Advance to quarter-finals	—	85–65	75–71	78–66
2	(Spain) UCAM Murcia	6	4	2	508	483	+25	10	Advance to quarter-finals	82–67	—	96–87	90–72
3	(Turkey) Darüşşafaka Lassa	6	2	4	492	525	−33	8		59–80	105–104	—	95–85
4	(Spain) Surne Bilbao Basket	6	1	5	447	483	−36	7		72–74	67–71	85–75	—

Source: Round of 16 Standings
Legend: Blue = home team win; Red = away team win.

== Playoffs ==
The playoffs began on April 4, 2023 and ends with the 2023 Basketball Champions League Final Four.

Quarterfinals
(Spain) Unicaja	83	96	—
(Spain) UCAM Murcia	67	74	—
(Germany) Telekom Baskets Bonn	76	76	83
(France) SIG Strasbourg	77	66	77
(Spain) Lenovo Tenerife	91	83	84
(Spain) Baxi Manresa	84	85	72
(Israel) Hapoel Jerusalem	64	78	91
(Greece) AEK	55	94	51

Semifinals
12 May
(Spain) Unicaja	67
(Germany) Telekom Baskets Bonn	69
12 May
(Spain) Lenovo Tenerife	68
(Israel) Hapoel Jerusalem	69

Final
14 May
(Germany) Telekom Baskets Bonn	77
(Israel) Hapoel Jerusalem	70
Third place
14 May
(Spain) Unicaja	79
(Spain) Lenovo Tenerife	84

== Final Four ==
=== Semifinals ===
The semifinals were played on 12 May 2023.

Team 1	Score	Team 2
Lenovo Tenerife (Spain)	68–69	(Israel) Hapoel Jerusalem
Unicaja (Spain)	67–69	(Germany) Telekom Baskets Bonn

=== Third place game ===
The third place game was played on 14 May 2023.

Team 1	Score	Team 2
Unicaja (Spain)	79–84	(Spain) Lenovo Tenerife

=== Final ===
The final was played on 14 May 2023.

Team 1	Score	Team 2
Telekom Baskets Bonn (Germany)	77–70	(Israel) Hapoel Jerusalem

== Individual awards ==
=== Season awards ===
The annual season awards were announced on 13 May.

Award	Player	Club
Most Valuable Player	(North Macedonia) T. J. Shorts	(Germany) Telekom Baskets Bonn
Final Four MVP	(North Macedonia) T. J. Shorts	(Germany) Telekom Baskets Bonn
Defensive Player of the Year	(Spain) Alberto Díaz	(Spain) Unicaja
Best Young Player	(Turkey) Sadık Emir Kabaca	(Turkey) Galatasaray Nef
Best Coach	(Finland) Tuomas Iisalo	(Germany) Telekom Baskets Bonn

=== Star Lineup ===
First Team		Second Team	
Player	Team	Player	Team
(Brazil) Marcelinho Huertas	(Spain) Lenovo Tenerife	(United States) Marcus Foster	(Lithuania) Rytas Vilnius
(North Macedonia) T. J. Shorts	(Germany) Telekom Baskets Bonn	(United States) Kendrick Perry	(Spain) Unicaja
(Spain) Darío Brizuela	(Spain) Unicaja	(United States) DeAndre Lansdowne	(France) SIG Strasbourg
(Panama) Akil Mitchell	(Greece) AEK	(United States) Levi Randolph	(Israel) Hapoel Bank Yahav Jerusalem
(United States) Zach Hankins	(Israel) Hapoel Bank Yahav Jerusalem	(Georgia (country)) Giorgi Shermadini	(Spain) Lenovo Tenerife

=== MVP of the Month ===
Month	Player	Club	Ref.
2022
October	(United States) Joe Ragland	(Israel) Hapoel Holon	
November	(United States) Marcus Foster	(Lithuania) Rytas Vilnius	
December	(North Macedonia) T. J. Shorts	(Germany) Telekom Baskets Bonn	
2023
January	(United States) Joe Ragland (2)	(Israel) Hapoel Holon	
February	(Panama) Akil Mitchell	(Greece) AEK	
March	(United States) Zach Hankins	(Israel) Hapoel Bank Yahav Jerusalem	
April	(United States) Levi Randolph	(Israel) Hapoel Bank Yahav Jerusalem	

== See also ==
- 2022–23 EuroLeague
- 2022–23 EuroCup Basketball
- 2022–23 FIBA Europe Cup
