= TJ Shorts II =

American-Macedonian basketball player (born 1997)

- Shorts with Valencia in 2026

No. 0 – Valencia Basket
- Position: Point guard
- League: Liga ACB; EuroLeague

Personal information
- Born: October 15, 1997 (age 29) Irvine, California, U.S.
- Listed height: 1.79 m (5 ft 10 in)
- Listed weight: 160 lb (73 kg)

Career information
- High school: Tustin (Tustin, California)
- College: Saddleback (2015–2017); UC Davis (2017–2019)
- NBA draft: 2019: undrafted
- Playing career: 2019–present

Career history
- 2019–2020: Ventspils
- 2020–2021: Hamburg Towers
- 2021–2022: Crailsheim Merlins
- 2022–2023: Telekom Baskets Bonn
- 2023–2025: Paris Basketball
- 2025–2026: Panathinaikos
- 2026–present: Valencia

Career highlights
- All-EuroLeague First Team (2025); EuroLeague assists leader (2025); 2× EuroLeague Play-in MVP (2025, 2026); EuroCup champion (2024); EuroCup MVP (2024); EuroCup Finals MVP (2024); All-EuroCup First Team (2024); EuroCup assists leader (2024); FIBA Champions League champion (2023); FIBA Champions League MVP (2023); FIBA Champions League Final Four MVP (2023); All-FIBA Champions League First Team (2023); FIBA Europe Cup Top Scorer (2022); Greek Cup winner (2026); LNB Élite champion (2025); French Cup winner (2025); French League Cup winner (2024); German Bundesliga MVP (2023); 2× LNB Élite MVP (2024, 2025); LNB Élite Finals MVP (2025); 2× All-LNB Élite First Team (2024, 2025); All-German Bundesliga First Team (2023); All-German Bundesliga Second Team (2022); German Bundesliga Top Scorer (2022); LNB Élite Top Scorer (2024); LNB Élite assists leader (2025); French League Cup MVP (2024); Big West Player of the Year (2018); First-team All-Big West (2018); Big West Newcomer of the Year (2018)

Timothy Neocartes Shorts II (born October 15, 1997) is an American-born naturalized Macedonian professional basketball player for Valencia of the Liga ACB and the EuroLeague. Standing at 1.79 m (5 ft 10 1/2 in), Shorts plays at the point guard position.

Shorts played college basketball for UC Davis where he was named the Big West Player of the Year. He started his professional career in Europe in 2019 with Ventspils and went on to play several one-year stints for different clubs. Shorts gained praise at the continent, winning the MVP award for the Basketball Champions League in 2023, and for the EuroCup in 2024.

Born in Irvine, California, Shorts became a citizen of North Macedonia and made his debut for the North Macedonia men's national basketball team in 2022.

== Early life ==
Shorts was born in Irvine, California, and received his first basketball by his mother at age 4.

== High school and college career ==
Shorts starred for Tustin High School but received no Division I scholarship offers, so he opted to go the junior college route. He played two seasons at Saddleback College and averaged 20 points per game as a sophomore before transferring to UC Davis. On February 6, 2018, Shorts had 31 points, seven assists and four steals in a double overtime victory against Long Beach State after leading scorer Chima Moneke was suspended. In a game against victory at Cal Poly on February 15, he recorded a triple double with 10 points, 10 rebounds and 10 assists. As a junior, Shorts averaged 15.2 points, 4.3 assists and 2.0 steals per game. He shot .538 field goal percentage, ranking fifth in the Big West. At the conclusion of the regular season he was named Big West Player of the year and Newcomer of the year, the first player in conference history to receive both honors in the same season.

== Professional career ==
=== Latvia (2019–2020) ===
Following the close of his college career, Shorts signed with Ventspils of the Latvian-Estonian Basketball League. He also played in 2019–20 FIBA Europe Cup with Ventspils, losing in quarterfinals of that competition before season was cancelled due to coronavirus pandemic.

=== Hamburg Towers and Crailsheim Merlins (2020–2022) ===
On July 30, 2020, he has signed with Hamburg Towers of Germany's Basketball Bundesliga.

On July 9, 2021, he left the German team Hamburg Towers. On July 28, Shorts signed with the Crailsheim Merlins.

On June 11, 2022, the Crailsheim Merlins announced, that Shorts is looking for a new challenge for the 2022/2023 season.

=== Telekom Baskets Bonn (2022–2023) ===
On June 22, 2022, he signed with Telekom Baskets Bonn of the German Basketball Bundesliga, recruited by the coach Tuomas Iisalo. On May 4, 2023, Shorts was given the Basketball Bundesliga Most Valuable Player award after leading Bonn to a first seed in the regular season. On May 13, Shorts was also named the Basketball Champions League MVP of the 2022–23 season after he had led the team to its first-ever Final Four.

Bonn won their first-ever trophy as they defeated Hapoel Jerusalem in the final, behind Shorts' game-high 29 points. After the game, he was named Final Four MVP, his third MVP award of the season. Bonn guard T. J. Shorts won the Final Four MVP award, becoming the first player in league history to win both the season MVP and Final Four MVP award in the same season. He scored 50 points in his two games, setting a new record for most points by a player, formerly held by Kevin Punter (2018). Shorts also set a record for most points in a final with 29 points.

=== Paris Basketball (2023–2025) ===
==== 2023–24 season ====
On July 8, 2023, he signed with Paris Basketball of the LNB Pro A on a two-year contract. He followed his Bonn head coach Tuomas Iisalo who had already signed with Paris earlier that summer.

On February 17, 2024, the team won the Leaders Cup, which was the first trophy in Paris Basketball's club history. In the final against Monaco, Shorts recorded 23 points and 5 assists in a 98–93 upset victory; he was subsequently named the tournament's MVP.

In the 2023–24 EuroCup, Paris had its best international season to date and won the club's first European title. On April 9, 2024, Shorts was named EuroCup MVP as he was praised for leading Paris to a 20–1 record and having set a league-record for most assists in a season.

On May 12, 2024, Shorts won the MVP Award of the LNB Pro A; the French league became the fourth league he was named the best player of. He also finished the season as the league's scoring champion. Despite this, Paris reached its first league finals but were defeated by Monaco, 1–3.

==== 2024–25 season ====
As the EuroCup champions, Paris qualified directly for the 2024–25 EuroLeague, where it made its debut. Shorts was named the EuroLeague MVP of the Month in November 2024, after helping Paris to an eight-game winning streak in the EuroLeague. On April 18, 2025, Shorts was named to the All-EuroLeague First Team, after scoring 18.8 points per game and a league-leading 7.5 assists per game. Paris qualified for the playoffs in its debut season, where it was eliminated by Fenerbahçe in the quarterfinals.

In the 2024–25 LNB Élite season, Paris finished the regular season on top with a 23–7 record, while Shorts won his second straight MVP award. On May 17, 2025, he also received the Best Passer award by the LNB. He also led Paris to win their first-ever French championship title, by defeating AS Monaco in the finals.

=== Panathinaikos (2025–2026) ===
Shorts officially signed a two-year contract with Panathinaikos on June 26, 2025, a move widely regarded as one of the EuroLeague's headline transfers of the summer. After leading Paris Basketball to domestic and European success and earning All-EuroLeague First Team honors, Shorts drew interest from Real Madrid, Barcelona, Efes, Fenerbahçe, Olympiacos, and even the NBA. Panathinaikos head coach Ergin Ataman praised the signing saying Shorts was “the most vital player of the season,”. adding that his playmaking and scoring “instantly upgrade our roster.” The deal does not include an NBA out clause, ensuring Shorts will be in Athens for the upcoming campaign.

=== Valencia (2026–present) ===
On July 7, 2026, Shorts signed a two-year contract with Valencia of the Liga ACB and the EuroLeague.

== National team career ==
On October 31, 2022, Shorts was added to the roster of North-Macedonia's men's national basketball team.

== Personal life ==
Growing up, Shorts was a fan of Chris Paul and he modeled his game after Tyrese Rice. He wears number 0 as this refers to the zero scholarship offers he received after leaving high school, and again after leaving junior college.

== Career statistics ==
Legend
GP	Games played	GS	Games started	MPG	Minutes per game
FG%	Field-goal percentage	3P%	3-point field-goal percentage	FT%	Free-throw percentage
RPG	Rebounds per game	APG	Assists per game	SPG	Steals per game
BPG	Blocks per game	PPG	Points per game	PIR	Performance index rating
**Bold**	Career high

†	Denotes season in which Shorts won the EuroCup
†	Denotes season in which Shorts won the Champions League

=== EuroLeague ===
Year	Team	GP	GS	MPG	FG%	3P%	FT%	RPG	APG	SPG	BPG	PPG	PIR
2024–25	Paris Basketball	37	37	27.2	.400	.361	.734	2.6	7.3	1.0	.1	19.0	22.8
Career		37	37	27.2	.400	.361	.734	2.6	7.3	1.0	.1	19.0	22.8

=== EuroCup ===
Year	Team	GP	GS	MPG	FG%	3P%	FT%	RPG	APG	SPG	BPG	PPG	PIR
2023–24†	Paris Basketball	23	23	26.0	.492	.265	.767	3.4	7.3	1.9	.1	18.0	14.8
Career		23	23	26.0	.492	.265	.767	3.4	7.3	1.9	.1	18.0	14.8

=== Basketball Champions League ===
Year	Team	GP	GS	MPG	FG%	3P%	FT%	RPG	APG	SPG	BPG	PPG
2022–23†	Baskets Bonn	23	23	30.2	.449	.373	.775	3.6	6.8	1.4	.1	19.5
Career		23	23	30.2	.449	.373	.775	3.6	6.8	1.4	.1	19.5

=== Domestic leagues ===
Year	Team	League	GP	MPG	FG%	3P%	FT%	RPG	APG	SPG	BPG	PPG
2019–20	(Latvia) Ventspils	LEBL	15	23.5	.574	.250	.756	3.2	5.0	1.4	.0	11.8
2020–21	(Germany) Hamburg Towers	BBL	37	27.0	.414	.281	.718	2.8	5.3	1.7	.1	14.3
2021–22	(Germany) Crailsheim Merlins	BBL	21	31.8	.528	.417	.833	3.4	7.0	1.9	.3	20.6
2022–23	(Germany) Baskets Bonn	BBL	29	27.7	.493	.317	.797	3.2	7.3	1.3	.0	18.2
2023–24	(France) Paris Basketball	LNB Élite	32	26.1	.484	.246	.776	3.3	6.3	1.1	.1	17.0
2024–25	(France) Paris Basketball	LNB Élite	41	25.6	.511	.369	.783	2.4	7.6	.9	.1	18.5
