= 2018–19 BBL-Pokal =

- Season: 2018–19
- Dates: 2 October 2018 – 17 February 2019
- Games played: 15
- Teams: 16

Finals
- Champions: Brose Bamberg (5th title)
- Runners-up: Alba Berlin
- Finals MVP: Nikos Zisis

The 2018–19 BBL-Pokal was the 52nd season of the German Basketball Cup, the domestic cup competition of the Basketball Bundesliga (BBL). This was the first season with the new format, which changed to a sixteen team knock-out tournament, with the sixteen highest seeded teams from the previous season qualifying.

Brose Bamberg won their fifth title after a one-point win over Alba Berlin in the final. Nikos Zisis hit the game-winner with 2.4 seconds left to give Bamberg the win by a one-point margin.

== Participants ==
The sixteen highest placed teams from the 2017–18 Basketball Bundesliga, without the relegated teams and promoted teams, qualified for the tournament.

Pos	Team	Pld	W	L	PF	PA	PD	Pts	Qualification or relegation
1	Bayern Munich	34	31	3	3011	2573	+438	62	Qualified
2	Alba Berlin	34	29	5	3044	2540	+504	58	Qualified
3	MHP Riesen Ludwigsburg	34	26	8	2932	2574	+358	52	Qualified
4	Brose Bamberg	34	22	12	2789	2594	+195	44	Qualified
5	Telekom Baskets Bonn	34	21	13	2815	2667	+148	42	Qualified
6	Medi Bayreuth	34	21	13	2849	2756	+93	42	Qualified
7	EWE Baskets Oldenburg	34	21	13	2922	2822	+100	42	Qualified
8	Fraport Skyliners	34	20	14	2649	2614	+35	40	Qualified
9	s.Oliver Würzburg	34	19	15	2690	2578	+112	38	Qualified
10	ratiopharm Ulm	34	16	18	2748	2775	−27	32	Qualified
11	Gießen 46ers	34	16	18	2949	3016	−67	32	Qualified
12	Basketball Löwen Braunschweig	34	14	20	2527	2741	−214	28	Qualified
13	Science City Jena	34	14	20	2677	2790	−113	28	Qualified
14	BG Göttingen	34	10	24	2684	2980	−296	20	Qualified
15	Mitteldeutscher BC	34	10	24	2748	2957	−209	20	Qualified
16	Eisbären Bremerhaven	34	8	26	2647	2857	−210	16	Qualified
17	Rockets	34	7	27	2566	2914	−348	14	
18	Tigers Tübingen	34	1	33	2525	3024	−499	2	

Source: Beko BBL
Rules for classification: 1) Points; 2) Head-to-head; 3) Points difference; 4) Points scored.

== Round and draw dates ==
Round	Draw	Dates
Round of 16	27 July 2018	6–7 October 2018
Quarterfinals	12 October 2018	22–23 December 2018
Semifinals	23 December 2018	20 January 2019
Final	23 December 2018	17 February 2019

== Round of 16 ==
The draw was held on 27 July 2018.

6 October 2018
18:00

Boxscore

Fraport Skyliners	78–74	ratiopharm Ulm
Scoring by quarter: 16–17, 18–25, 21–16, 23–16
Pts: Brady Heslip 24; Rebs: Jonas Wohlfarth-Bottermann 9 Asts: Trae Bell-Haynes 6		Pts: Dwayne Evans 25; Rebs: Javonte Green 8 Asts: Patrick Miller 7

Fraport Arena, Frankfurt
Attendance: 3,560
Referees: Clemens Fritz, Enrico Streit, Stefan Fingerling

6 October 2018
18:00

Boxscore

BG Göttingen	72–67	MHP Riesen Ludwigsburg
Scoring by quarter: 19–17, 13–14, 10–26, 30–10
Pts: Derek Willis 19; Rebs: Derek Willis 8 Asts: Michael Stockton 9		Pts: Jordon Crawford 20; Rebs: Kelan Martin 9 Asts: Jordon Crawford 6

Sparkassen Arena, Göttingen
Attendance: 2,168
Referees: Johannes Hack, Radeesh Kattur, Steve Bittner

6 October 2018
20:30

Boxscore

Eisbären Bremerhaven	69–89	Telekom Baskets Bonn
Scoring by quarter: 23–20, 17–25, 15–27, 14–17
Pts: Jordan Brangers 22; Rebs: Fabian Bleck 7 Asts: Turner, Warren 3		Pts: Ra'Shad James 18; Rebs: James Webb 12; Asts: Charles Jackson 5

Bremerhaven Stadthalle, Bremerhaven
Attendance: 1,063
Referees: Moritz Reiter, Konstantin Simonow, Henning Frölich

6 October 2018
20:30

Boxscore

Brose Bamberg	92–74	s.Oliver Würzburg
Scoring by quarter: 30–14, 21–23, 21–15, 20–22
Pts: Tyrese Rice 20; Rebs: Cliff Alexander 8 Asts: Nikos Zisis 8		Pts: Skyler Bowlin 16; Rebs: Gabriel Olaseni 7 Asts: Gabriel Olaseni 4

Brose Arena, Bamberg
Attendance: 6,150
Referees: Robert Lottermoser, Carsten Straube, Andreas Bohn

7 October 2018
15:00

Boxscore

Alba Berlin	88–68	Medi Bayreuth
Scoring by quarter: 19–19, 31–15, 14–17, 24–17
Pts: Niels Giffey 18; Rebs: Luke Sikma 9 Asts: three players 6		Pts: Adonis Thomas 17; Rebs: three players 3 Asts: Robertson, Stockton 3

Mercedes-Benz Arena, Berlin
Attendance: 6,851
Referees: Benjamin Barth, Julian Groll, Dominic Bejaoui

7 October 2018
15:00

Boxscore

Bayern Munich	106–92	Gießen 46ers
Scoring by quarter: 28–17, 32–16, 22–27, 24–32
Pts: Danilo Barthel 17; Rebs: Devin Booker 9 Asts: Devin Booker 6		Pts: John Bryant 18; Rebs: John Bryant 7 Asts: Bryant, Taylor 5

Audi Dome, Munich
Attendance: 3,890
Referees: Anne Panther, Christof Madinger, Nicolas Brendel

7 October 2018
18:00

Boxscore

EWE Baskets Oldenburg	91–94	Science City Jena
Scoring by quarter: 29–20, 24–21, 20–24, 18–29
Pts: Nathan Boothe 22; Rebs: Philipp Schwethelm 8 Asts: Will Cummings 7		Pts: Dru Joyce 22; Rebs: Oliver Mackeldanz 6 Asts: Dru Joyce 7

Große EWE Arena, Oldenburg
Attendance: 4,018
Referees: Martin Matip, Nesa Kovačević, Zulfikar Oruzgani

7 October 2018
18:00

Boxscore

Basketball Löwen Braunschweig	83–75	Mitteldeutscher BC
Scoring by quarter: 13–17, 14–25, 25–18, 31–15
Pts: Thomas Klepeisz 21; Rebs: Scott Eatherton 9 Asts: Travis Taylor 4		Pts: Trevor Releford 20; Rebs: James Farr 6 Asts: Lee Moore 4

Volkswagen Halle, Braunschweig
Attendance: 2,267
Referees: Oliver Krause, Tamer Arik, Moritz Krüper

== Quarterfinals ==
The draw was held on 12 October 2018.

22 December 2018
18:00

Boxscore

Fraport Skyliners	80–70	Basketball Löwen Braunschweig
Scoring by quarter: 16–21, 22–17, 20–12, 22–20
Pts: Jason Clark 18; Rebs: Leon Kratzer 9 Asts: Trae Bell-Haynes 10		Pts: Blake, Eatherton 15; Rebs: Blake, Eatherton 7 Asts: Klepeisz, Rahon 3

Fraport Arena, Frankfurt
Attendance: 4,800
Referees: Moritz Reiter, Christof Mading, Steve Bittner

22 December 2018
20:30

Boxscore

BG Göttingen	64–83	Brose Bamberg
Scoring by quarter: 12–28, 16–16, 21–22, 15–17
Pts: Derek Willis 16; Rebs: three players 4 Asts: Dominic Lockhart 8		Pts: Tyrese Rice 14; Rebs: Harris, Rice 5 Asts: Tyrese Rice 5

Sparkassen Arena, Göttingen
Attendance: 3,447
Referees: Martin Matip, Anne Panther, Carsten Straube

23 December 2018
15:00

Boxscore

Science City Jena	86–89	Telekom Baskets Bonn
Scoring by quarter: 23–18, 23–30, 21–19, 19–22
Pts: Derrick Allen 21; Rebs: Derrick Allen 6 Asts: Joyce, Mažeika 5		Pts: Josh Mayo 21; Rebs: Josh Mayo 6 Asts: Josh Mayo 7

Sparkassen-Arena, Jena
Attendance: 3,076
Referees: Toni Rodriguez, Benjamin Barth, Oliver Krause

23 December 2018
18:00

Boxscore

Bayern Munich	70–78	Alba Berlin
Scoring by quarter: 24–21, 16–20, 15–20, 15–17
Pts: Derrick Williams 15; Rebs: Barthel, Đedović 6 Asts: Stefan Jović 4		Pts: Jonas Mattisseck 15; Rebs: Luke Sikma 10; Asts: Luke Sikma 8

Audi Dome, Munich
Attendance: 6,500
Referees: Robert Lottermoser, Clemens Fritz, Nesa Kovačević

== Semifinals ==
The draw was held on 23 December 2018.

20 January 2019
15:00

Boxscore

Fraport Skyliners	70–105	Alba Berlin
Scoring by quarter: 17–27, 12–30, 22–27, 19–21
Pts: Quantez Robertson 16; Rebs: Elijah Clarance 4 Asts: Quantez Robertson 6		Pts: Giesraitis, Giffey 16; Rebs: Luke Sikma 8 Asts: Stefan Peno 10

Fraport Arena, Frankfurt
Attendance: 5,000
Referees: Anne Panther, Martin Matip, Toni Rodriguez

20 January 2019
18:00

Boxscore

Brose Bamberg	90–87	Telekom Baskets Bonn
Scoring by quarter: 14–21, 32–29, 28–21, 16–16
Pts: Alexander, Rice 21; Rebs: Cliff Alexander 8 Asts: Rice, Zisis 6		Pts: Martin Breunig 21; Rebs: Yorman Polas Bartolo 6 Asts: Josh Mayo 6

Brose Arena, Bamberg
Attendance: 5,889
Referees: Robert Lottermoser, Moritz Reiter, Benjamin Barth

== Final ==
The draw for home-court advantage was held on 20 January 2019.

17 February 2019
15:00

Boxscore

Brose Bamberg	83–82	Alba Berlin
Scoring by quarter: 20–16, 24–21, 19–17, 20–28
Pts: Tyrese Rice 20; Rebs: three players 4 Asts: Nikos Zisis 8		Pts: Rokas Giedraitis 23; Rebs: Landry Nnoko 9 Asts: Peyton Siva 7

Brose Arena, Bamberg
Attendance: 6,150
Referees: Robert Lottermoser, Martin Matip, Anne Panther

== See also ==
- 2018–19 Basketball Bundesliga
