= 2019–20 BBL-Pokal =

- Season: 2019–20
- Dates: 28 September 2019 – 16 February 2020
- Games played: 15
- Teams: 16

Finals
- Champions: Alba Berlin (10th title)
- Runners-up: EWE Baskets Oldenburg

The 2019–20 BBL-Pokal was the 53rd season of the BBL-Pokal, the domestic cup competition of the Basketball Bundesliga (BBL).

== Participants ==
The sixteen highest placed teams from the 2018–19 Basketball Bundesliga, without the relegated teams and promoted teams, qualified for the tournament.

=== Standings ===
Pos	Team	Pld	W	L	PF	PA	PD	Pts	Qualification
1	Bayern Munich	34	31	3	3019	2598	+421	62	Qualified
2	EWE Baskets Oldenburg	34	28	6	3157	2782	+375	56	Qualified
3	Alba Berlin	34	27	7	3125	2742	+383	54	Qualified
4	Rasta Vechta	34	24	10	2978	2809	+169	48	Qualified
5	Brose Bamberg	34	22	12	3010	2880	+130	44	Qualified
6	ratiopharm Ulm	34	20	14	2975	2896	+79	40	Qualified
7	Telekom Baskets Bonn	34	18	16	2932	2955	−23	36	Qualified
8	Basketball Löwen Braunschweig	34	17	17	2890	2853	+37	34	Qualified
9	s.Oliver Würzburg	34	17	17	2773	2822	−49	34	Qualified
10	MHP Riesen Ludwigsburg	34	16	18	2880	2899	−19	32	Qualified
11	Fraport Skyliners	34	16	18	2688	2794	−106	32	Qualified
12	Medi Bayreuth	34	14	20	2897	2978	−81	28	Qualified
13	Gießen 46ers	34	13	21	3065	3192	−127	26	Qualified
14	BG Göttingen	34	11	23	2699	2828	−129	22	Qualified
15	Mitteldeutscher BC	34	10	24	2879	3053	−174	20	Qualified
16	Crailsheim Merlins	34	9	25	2829	3091	−262	18	Qualified
17	Eisbären Bremerhaven	34	8	26	2746	2969	−223	16	
18	Science City Jena	34	5	29	2640	3039	−399	10	

Source: Beko BBL
Rules for classification: 1) Points; 2) Head-to-head; 3) Points difference; 4) Points scored.

== Round and draw dates ==
Round	Draw	Dates
Round of 16	23 May 2019	28–29 September 2019; 14 October 2019
Quarterfinals	29 September 2019	14–15 December 2019
Semifinals	15 December 2019	12 January 2020
Final	12 January 2020	16 February 2020

== Round of 16 ==
The games were played between 28 September and 14 October 2019.

28 September 2019
18:00

Boxscore

Alba Berlin	92–81	s.Oliver Würzburg
Scoring by quarter: 25–19, 24–28, 17–14, 26–20
Pts: Marcus Eriksson 19; Rebs: Nnoko, Sikma 6 Asts: Martin Hermannsson 10		Pts: Jordan Hulls 18; Rebs: Luke Fischer 7 Asts: Luke Fischer 5

Mercedes-Benz Arena, Berlin
Attendance: 7,233
Referees: Robert Lottermoser, Oliver Krause, Dennis Sirowi

28 September 2019
18:00

Boxscore

ratiopharm Ulm	88–71	Rasta Vechta
Scoring by quarter: 29–19, 27–14, 16–14, 16–24
Pts: Zoran Dragić 16; Rebs: Derek Willis 7 Asts: Hayes, Willis 5		Pts: Trevis Simpson 14; Rebs: Michael Kessens 9 Asts: Kamari Murphy 4

Arena Ulm/Neu-Ulm, Ulm
Attendance: 5,907
Referees: Clemens Firtz, Christof Madinger, Enrico Streit

28 September 2019
20:30

Boxscore

Mitteldeutscher BC	91–79	medi Bayreuth
Scoring by quarter: 25–17, 27–23, 25–18, 14–21
Pts: Strahinja Mićović 14; Rebs: Cameron Jackson 7 Asts: Kajami-Keane, Warren 6		Pts: James Woodard 23; Rebs: Evan Bruinsma 7 Asts: James Robinson 7

Stadthalle Weißenfels, Weißenfels
Attendance: 2,100
Referees: Carsten Straube, Steve Bittner, Dominik Bejaoui

28 September 2019
20:30

Boxscore

MHP Riesen Ludwigsburg	87–90	Basketball Löwen Braunschweig
Scoring by quarter: 25–32, 16–17, 30–18, 16–23
Pts: Khadeen Carrington 26; Rebs: Nick Weiler-Babb 7 Asts: Nick Weiler-Babb 4		Pts: Scott Eatherton 26; Rebs: Scott Eatherton 6 Asts: Scott Eatherton 4

Arena Ludwigsburg, Ludwigsburg
Attendance: 2,168
Referees: Moritz Reiter, Tamer Arik, Michael Gutting

29 September 2019
15:00

Boxscore

Fraport Skyliners	74–79	BG Göttingen
Scoring by quarter: 19–22, 17–19, 26–15, 12–23
Pts: Lamont Jones 28; Rebs: Quantez Robinson 8 Asts: Quantez Robinson 6		Pts: Mihajlo Andrić 21; Rebs: Daruis Carter 7 Asts: Bennet Hundt 5

Fraport Arena, Frankfurt
Attendance: 4,900
Referees: Martin Matip, Nesa Kovačević, Julian Groll

29 September 2019
15:00

Boxscore

Crailsheim Merlins	75–86	EWE Baskets Oldenburg
Scoring by quarter: 22–26, 21–27, 16–16, 16–17
Pts: Jan Špan 21; Rebs: Jan Špan 6 Asts: DeWayne Russell 6		Pts: Rickey Paulding 17; Rebs: Rašid Mahalbašić 9 Asts: Rašid Mahalbašić 10

Arena Hohenlohe, Crailsheim
Attendance: 2,014
Referees: Benjamin Barth, Zulfikar Oruzgani, Andreas Bohn

29 September 2019
18:00

Boxscore

Gießen 46ers	66–72	Brose Bamberg
Scoring by quarter: 19–19, 18–17, 14–19, 13–17
Pts: Stephen Brown 18; Rebs: Luke Petrasek 7 Asts: Brown, Thomas 3		Pts: Assem Marei 17; Rebs: Marei, Sengfelder 10; Asts: Paris Lee 7

Sporthalle Gießen-Ost, Gießen
Attendance: 2,149
Referees: Anne Panther, Johannes Hack, Moritz Krüper

14 October 2019
20:30

Boxscore

Bayern Munich	84–85	Telekom Baskets Bonn
Scoring by quarter: 22–21, 18–32, 24–10, 20–22
Pts: Maodo Lô 19; Rebs: Danilo Barthel 5 Asts: Maodo Lô 3		Pts: Breunig, Saibou 14; Rebs: Breunig, DiLeo 5 Asts: Joshiko Saibou 6

Audi Dome, Munich
Attendance: 3,914
Referees: Robert Lottermoser, Christof Madinger, Gentian Cici

== Quarterfinals ==
The games were played 14 and 15 December 2019.

14 December 2019
18:00

Boxscore

Basketball Löwen Braunschweig	69–80	Brose Bamberg
Scoring by quarter: 13–16, 15–22, 18–18, 23–24
Pts: Lucca Staiger 14; Rebs: Scott Eatherton 9 Asts: Trevor Releford 4		Pts: Christian Sengfelder 22; Rebs: Assem Marei 9 Asts: Paris Lee 6

Volkswagen Halle, Braunschweig
Attendance: 3,057
Referees: Robert Lottermoser, Carsten Straube, Moritz Krüper

14 December 2019
20:30

Boxscore

ratiopharm Ulm	86–80	BG Göttingen
Scoring by quarter: 26–21, 22–12, 22–29, 16–18
Pts: Zoran Dragić 22; Rebs: Derek Willis 6 Asts: Killian Hayes 4		Pts: Elias Lasisi 19; Rebs: Dylan Osetkowski 8 Asts: Kyan Anderson 5

Arena Ulm/Neu-Ulm, Ulm
Attendance: 5,911
Referees: Moritz Reiter, Benjamin Barth, Christof Madinger

15 December 2019
15:00

Boxscore

Alba Berlin	82–77	Mitteldeutscher BC
Scoring by quarter: 17–24, 10–15, 29–19, 26–19
Pts: Marcus Eriksson 18; Rebs: Landry Nnoko 10; Asts: Peyton Siva 5		Pts: Kaza Kajami-Keane 28; Rebs: Kaza Kajami-Keane 9 Asts: Jovan Novak 10

Mercedes-Benz Arena, Berlin
Attendance: 8,344
Referees: Robert Lottermoser, Oliver Krause, Steve Bittner

15 December 2019
18:00

Boxscore

Telekom Baskets Bonn	81–88	EWE Baskets Oldenburg
Scoring by quarter: 12–16, 22–20, 13–23, 34–29
Pts: Branden Frazier 19; Rebs: Breunig, Polas 5 Asts: Branden Frazier 3		Pts: Rašid Mahalbašić 17; Rebs: Rašid Mahalbašić 11; Asts: Braydon Hobbs 5

Telekom Dome, Bonn
Attendance: 4,600
Referees: Anne Panther, Martin Matip, Nesa Kovačević

== Semifinals ==
The draw was held on 15 December 2019. The matches were played on 12 January 2020.

12 January 2020
15:00

Boxscore

ratiopharm Ulm	76–84	EWE Baskets Oldenburg
Scoring by quarter: 17–19, 27–26, 16–22, 16–17
Pts: Harvey, Jerrett 13; Rebs: Schilling, Willis 6 Asts: Dragić, Harvey 5		Pts: Rickey Paulding 21; Rebs: Braydon Hobbs 7 Asts: Rašid Mahalbašić 5

Arena Ulm/Neu-Ulm, Ulm
Attendance: 6,108
Referees: Robert Lottermoser, Moritz Reiter, Clemens Fritz

12 January 2020
18:00

Boxscore

Brose Bamberg	66–82	Alba Berlin
Scoring by quarter: 15–18, 21–24, 7–28, 23–12
Pts: Bryce Taylor 15; Rebs: Kameron Taylor 6 Asts: Kameron Taylor 6		Pts: Rokas Giedraitis 16; Rebs: Nnoko, Sikma 6 Asts: Nnoko, Siva 5

Brose Arena, Bamberg
Attendance: 5,775
Referees: Anne Panther, Martin Matip, Toni Rodriguez

== Final ==
The final was played on 16 February 2020.

16 February 2020
20:30

Boxscore

Alba Berlin	89–67	EWE Baskets Oldenburg
Scoring by quarter: 19–20, 21–23, 25–8, 24–16
Pts: Martin Hermannsson 20; Rebs: Luke Sikma 11; Asts: Sikma, Siva 6		Pts: Braydon Hobbs 17; Rebs: Rašid Mahalbašić 10; Asts: Rickey Paulding 3

Mercedes-Benz Arena, Berlin
Attendance: 14,614
Referees: Anne Panther, Toni Rodriguez, Benjamin Barth

== See also ==
- 2019–20 Basketball Bundesliga
