= 2019–20 Basketball Bundesliga =

German basketball season

Basketball Bundesliga
- Season: 2019–20
- Dates: 24 September 2019 – 28 June 2020
- Teams: 17

Regular season
- Top seed: Bayern Munich

Finals
- Champions: Alba Berlin; 9th title
- Runners-up: MHP Riesen Ludwigsburg
- Semi-finalists: EWE Baskets Oldenburg ratiopharm Ulm
- Finals MVP: (United States) Marcos Knight

Statistical leaders
Points	(United States) Scott Eatherton	17.7
Rebounds	(United States) Scott Eatherton	8.2
Assists	(Serbia) Jovan Novak	8.9

Records
- Attendance: 730,787
- Average attendance: 3,513

Seasons
- ← 2018–19 2020–21 →

The 2019–20 Basketball Bundesliga, known as the easyCredit BBL for sponsorship reasons, was the 54th season of the Basketball Bundesliga (BBL), the top-tier level of professional club basketball in Germany, held from 24 September 2019 to 28 June 2020. The defending champion was Bayern Munich.

Alba Berlin won the final tournament and their ninth title.

Due to the COVID-19 pandemic the league postponed matchday 23 and monitored the situation. On 25 March, the league was suspended until 30 April. The season was finished with ten teams playing at a neutral venue.

== Teams ==
Location of teams in 2019–20 Basketball Bundesliga

=== Team changes ===
Promoted from 2018–19 ProA	Relegated from 2018–19 Basketball Bundesliga
Hamburg Towers	Eisbären Bremerhaven; Science City Jena

This was the first season in which teams were required to have a minimum budget of €3 million and a minimum equity of €250,000. Seventeen clubs obtained a license for this season.

Hamburg Towers were promoted to the BBL after winning the 2018–19 ProA, while Nürnberg Falcons were promoted as runner-up but were unable to obtain a license. Eisbären Bremerhaven and Science City Jena were relegated.

=== Arenas and locations ===
Team	City	Arena	Capacity
Brose Bamberg	Bamberg	Brose Arena	6,150
medi Bayreuth	Bayreuth	Oberfrankenhalle	4,000
Alba Berlin	Berlin	Mercedes-Benz Arena	14,500
Telekom Baskets Bonn	Bonn	Telekom Dome	6,000
Löwen Braunschweig	Braunschweig	Volkswagen Halle	6,600
Crailsheim Merlins	Crailsheim	Arena Hohenlohe	3,000
Fraport Skyliners	Frankfurt	Fraport Arena	5,002
Gießen 46ers	Gießen	Sporthalle Gießen-Ost	4,003
BG Göttingen	Göttingen	Sparkassen Arena	3,447
Hamburg Towers	Hamburg	Edel-optics.de Arena	3,400
Riesen Ludwigsburg	Ludwigsburg	MHP-Arena	5,300
Syntainics MBC	Weißenfels	Stadthalle Weißenfels	3,000
Bayern Munich	Munich	Audi Dome	6,700
EWE Baskets Oldenburg	Oldenburg	Große EWE Arena	6,069
ratiopharm Ulm	Ulm	Arena Ulm/Neu-Ulm	6,000
Rasta Vechta	Vechta	Rasta Dome	3,140
s.Oliver Würzburg	Würzburg	s.Oliver Arena	3,140

=== Personnel and sponsorship ===
Team	Head coach	Kit manufacturer	Shirt sponsor
Alba Berlin	(Spain) Aíto García Reneses	Adidas	ALBA SE
Bayern Munich	(Serbia) Oliver Kostić	Adidas	BayWa
BG Göttingen	(Netherlands) Johan Roijakkers	Nike	Satorius
Brose Bamberg	(Belgium) Roel Moors	Macron	Brose
Crailsheim Merlins	(Finland) Tuomas Iisalo	Hakro	Hakro
Hamburg Towers	(United States) Mike Taylor	K1x	VTG
EWE Baskets Oldenburg	(Germany) Mladen Drijenčić	Owayo	EWE
Fraport Skyliners	(Canada) Gordon Herbert	Peak	Fraport
Gießen 46ers	(Germany) Ingo Freyer	K1x	Rovema
Löwen Braunschweig	(Germany) Frank Menz	Spalding	hey car
medi Bayreuth	(Austria) Raoul Korner	K1x	Medi
MHP Riesen Ludwigsburg	(United States) John Patrick	Macron	Mieschke Hofmann und Partner
Syntainics MBC	(Poland) Wojciech Kamiński	K1x	Puraglobe
Rasta Vechta	(Spain) Pedro Calles	Spalding	Rasta
ratiopharm Ulm	(Slovenia) Jaka Lakovič	Nike	Ratiopharm
s.Oliver Würzburg	(Germany) Denis Wucherer	K1x	s.Oliver
Telekom Baskets Bonn	(Bosnia and Herzegovina) Predrag Krunić	Spalding	Deutsche Telekom

=== Coaching changes ===
Team	Outgoing coach	Manner of departure	Date of vacancy	Position in table	Replaced with	Date of appointment
ratiopharm Ulm	(Germany) Thorsten Leibenath	End of contract	1 June 2019	Pre-season	(Slovenia) Jaka Lakovič	7 June 2018
Syntainics MBC	(Croatia) Silvano Poropat	End of contract	1 June 2019	Pre-season	(Poland) Wojciech Kamiński	12 June 2019
Brose Bamberg	(Italy) Federico Perego	Signed with VL Pesaro	14 June 2019	Pre-season	(Belgium) Roel Moors	20 June 2019
Bayern Munich	(Montenegro) Dejan Radonjić	Sacked	7 January 2020	1st	(Serbia) Oliver Kostić	7 January 2020
Skyliners Frankfurt	(Canada) Gordon Herbert	End of contract	18 May 2020	14th (6–15)	(Germany) Sebastian Gleim	18 May 2020

== Regular season ==
In the regular season, teams would have played against each other two times home-and-away in a round-robin format. The eight first qualified teams would advanced to the playoffs. The last placed team would have been relegated to the ProA for next season.

=== League table ===
Pos	Team	Pld	W	L	PF	PA	PD	Pts	Qualification
1	Bayern Munich	21	19	2	1788	1555	+233	38	Closing tournament (Note: Because of the COVID-19 pandemic in Germany, the season was interrupted in March. The BBL proposed to let 10 teams finish the season in a closing tournament. It was also decided there is no relegation this season.)
2	MHP Riesen Ludwigsburg	21	17	4	1816	1655	+161	34	Closing tournament
3	Crailsheim Merlins	21	15	6	1890	1772	+118	30	Closing tournament
4	Alba Berlin	19	14	5	1774	1551	+223	28	Closing tournament
5	EWE Baskets Oldenburg	20	13	7	1687	1663	+24	26	Closing tournament
6	Rasta Vechta	21	12	9	1695	1718	−23	24 (Note: Vechta 80–66 Bamberg)	Closing tournament
7	Brose Bamberg	21	12	9	1734	1648	+86	24	Closing tournament
8	s.Oliver Würzburg	21	11	10	1755	1785	−30	22 (Note: Würzburg 90–75 Göttingen)	
9	BG Göttingen	21	11	10	1727	1788	−61	22	Closing tournament
10	ratiopharm Ulm	20	10	10	1748	1709	+39	20	Closing tournament
11	Basketball Löwen Braunschweig	20	9	11	1791	1831	−40	18	
12	Medi Bayreuth	21	9	12	1811	1811	0	18	
13	Gießen 46ers	20	6	14	1694	1785	−91	12	
14	Skyliners Frankfurt	21	6	15	1579	1692	−113	12	Closing tournament
15	Telekom Baskets Bonn	20	4	16	1687	1824	−137	8	
16	Mitteldeutscher BC	20	3	17	1791	1949	−158	6 (Note: Mitteldeutscher BC 104–83 Hamburg)	
17	Hamburg Towers	20	3	17	1624	1855	−231	6	

Source: BBL
Rules for classification: 1) points; 2) head-to-head points; 3) head-to-head points difference; 4) head-to-head number of points scored.

=== Results ===
Home \ Away	BAM	BAY	BER	BON	BRA	CRA	FRA	GIE	GOT	HAM	LUD	MBC	MUN	OLD	ULM	VEC	WUR
Brose Bamberg	—		74–78				87–76	93–81	89–82	77–66	75–68		76–82		78–81	85–86	69–72
Medi Bayreuth	75–88	—	78–82	82–79	95–89			115–99	75–90			104–86	75–91	86–75	69–85		79–88
Alba Berlin	107–70		—			98–82	87–53		96–71			116–108		90–77		101–78	
Telekom Baskets Bonn	81–106		87–90	—	85–90	82–114	77–76	112–96		90–102	77–83	103–85					86–95
Basketball Löwen Braunschweig	85–94				—	105–115		92–86	87–91	94–97		102–88		71–93	94–88		100–87
Crailsheim Merlins	73–69	83–76	91–82	85–66	98–81	—	68–76		83–57	101–98	83–92			93–98	91–79	101–88	
Skyliners Frankfurt	72–87	73–88			81–82	81–83	—	81–65		83–78	54–79		77–81	74–87			
Gießen 46ers		100–93		85–87		92–108	82–90	—		75–79	98–88	98–95	70–82	83–68	77–97	79–87	91–87
BG Göttingen			72–71	80–77	77–96		89–77	63–90	—	101–95	77–83	107–95	90–81	104–87	65–86	72–77	
Hamburg Towers	59–89	81–95	75–100			91–92			87–93	—	92–98	83–104				72–79	83–86
MHP Riesen Ludwigsburg		89–84	81–77	94–80	91–77		82–64			94–83	—		81–74		106–75	85–78	
Mitteldeutscher BC	96–99	88–102			89–95	87–95	92–99		84–90		87–89	—	86–96	86–113		88–87	
Bayern Munich		91–79	84–80	93–85	75–62	82–63		94–75	82–81	111–55			—	79–58	83–69		71–60
EWE Baskets Oldenburg	71–68		93–88	88–83			85–81			91–79	83–78		83–90	—	91–104	83–76	90–82
ratiopharm Ulm		103–93	106–112	85–73	98–103		72–78			102–69	76–94	96–80			—	84–62	73–82
Rasta Vechta	80–66	84–83		95–83	104–103		73–65	73–72			77–72	84–88	68–76	68–73		—	89–87
s.Oliver Würzburg	77–95	66–85	82–110	100–93	97–83	92–88	68–67		90–75		84–89	91–79	82–90				—

Source: BBL
Legend: Blue = home team win; Red = away team win.
Matches with lighter background shading were decided after overtime.

== End of season tournament ==
Because of the COVID-19 pandemic in Germany, the board of the BBL decided on 27 April to continue the season in a tournament format. The nine highest-placed teams in the regular season and Frankfurt played behind closed doors. On 19 May, the Bavarian government allowed the tournament to be held at the Audi Dome in Munich. The schedule was announced on 20 May 2020.

All times are local (UTC+2).

=== Preliminary round ===
==== Group A ====
Pos	Team	Pld	W	L	PF	PA	PD	Pts	Qualification
1	ratiopharm Ulm	4	4	0	361	297	+64	8	Quarterfinals
2	EWE Baskets Oldenburg	4	3	1	320	311	+9	6	Quarterfinals
3	Bayern Munich (H)	4	2	2	366	318	+48	4	Quarterfinals
4	BG Göttingen	4	1	3	272	337	−65	2	Quarterfinals
5	Crailsheim Merlins	4	0	4	320	376	−56	0	

Source: BBL
Rules for classification: 1) points; 2) head-to-head points; 3) head-to-head points difference; 4) head-to-head number of points scored.
(H) Hosts

6 June 2020
16:30

Boxscore

BG Göttingen	89–78	Crailsheim Merlins
Scoring by quarter: 29–20, 22–22, 17–17, 21–19
Pts: Bennet Hundt 30; Rebs: Mihajlo Andrić 8 Asts: Alex Ruoff 10		Pts: Javontae Hawkins 17; Rebs: Bleck, Ogunsipe 8 Asts: Russell, Stuckey 5

Audi Dome, Munich
Attendance: 0
Referees: Moritz Reiter, Carsten Straube, Enrico Streit

6 June 2020
20:30

Boxscore

Bayern Munich	85–95	ratiopharm Ulm
Scoring by quarter: 20–18, 20–23, 18–21, 27–33
Pts: Vladimir Lučić 23; Rebs: Vladimir Lučić 8 Asts: Barthel, Lô 5		Pts: Tyler Harvey 21; Rebs: Heckmann, Osetkowski 7 Asts: Thomas Klepeisz 5

Audi Dome, Munich
Attendance: 0
Referees: Anne Panther, Clemens Fritz, Moritz Krüper

8 June 2020
16:30

Boxscore

Crailsheim Merlins	79–110	Bayern Munich
Scoring by quarter: 11–26, 24–25, 21–35, 23–24
Pts: Sebastian Herrera 27; Rebs: Javontae Hawkins 4 Asts: Herrera, Kovačević 5		Pts: Mathias Lessort 20; Rebs: Mathias Lessort 9 Asts: Žan Mark Šiško 5

Audi Dome, Munich
Attendance: 0
Referees: Toni Rodriguez, Gentian Cici, Steve Bittner

8 June 2020
20:30

Boxscore

EWE Baskets Oldenburg	66–85	ratiopharm Ulm
Scoring by quarter: 17–19, 18–23, 15–20, 16–23
Pts: Nathan Boothe 19; Rebs: Rašid Mahalbašić 7 Asts: Braydon Hobbs 5		Pts: Tyler Harvey 15; Rebs: Dylan Osetkowski 8 Asts: Thomas Klepeisz 6

Audi Dome, Munich
Attendance: 0
Referees: Moritz Reiter, Christof Madinger, Benjamin Barth

10 June 2020
16:30

Boxscore

EWE Baskets Oldenburg	80–62	BG Göttingen
Scoring by quarter: 23–18, 21–21, 20–13, 16–10
Pts: Rašid Mahalbašić 22; Rebs: Nathan Boothe 10; Asts: Tyler Larson 4		Pts: Terry Allen 16; Rebs: Allen, Mönninghoff 5 Asts: Bennet Hundt 3

Audi Dome, Munich
Attendance: 0
Referees: Clemens Fritz, Toni Rodriguez, Steve Bittner

10 June 2020
20:30

Boxscore

ratiopharm Ulm	92–80	Crailsheim Merlins
Scoring by quarter: 28–30, 24–22, 24–13, 16–15
Pts: Dylan Osetkowski 17; Rebs: Derek Willis 12; Asts: Thomas Klepeisz 7		Pts: Maurice Stuckey 20; Rebs: David Brembly 8 Asts: Sebastian Herrera 9

Audi Dome, Munich
Attendance: 0
Referees: Benjamin Barth, Carsten Straube, Christof Madinger

12 June 2020
16:30

Boxscore

BG Göttingen	55–90	Bayern Munich
Scoring by quarter: 18–26, 13–21, 12–24, 12–19
Pts: Marvin Omuvwie 13; Rebs: Marvin Omuvwie 7 Asts: Bennett Hundt 4		Pts: Danilo Barthel 19; Rebs: Lessort, Lô 6 Asts: T. J. Bray 5

Audi Dome, Munich
Attendance: 0
Referees: Christof Madinger, Moritz Reiter, Clemens Fritz

12 June 2020
20:30

Boxscore

Crailsheim Merlins	83–85	EWE Baskets Oldenburg
Scoring by quarter: 16–20, 22–24, 24–16, 21–25
Pts: Maurice Stuckey 17; Rebs: Fabian Bleck 10; Asts: Fabian Bleck 7		Pts: Rašid Mahalbašić 19; Rebs: Rašid Mahalbašić 10; Asts: Boothe, Hobbs 3

Audi Dome, Munich
Attendance: 0
Referees: Toni Rodriguez, Moritz Krüper, Benjamin Barth

14 June 2020
15:00

Boxscore

ratiopharm Ulm	89–66	BG Göttingen
Scoring by quarter: 17–14, 22–20, 27–19, 23–14
Pts: Thomas Klepeisz 16; Rebs: Tyler Harvey 5 Asts: Tyler Harvey 6		Pts: Alex Ruoff 18; Rebs: Dennis Kramer 8 Asts: Bennett Hundt 7

Audi Dome, Munich
Attendance: 0
Referees: Benjamin Barth, Anne Panther, Moritz Krüper

14 June 2020
19:00

Boxscore

Bayern Munich	81–89	EWE Baskets Oldenburg
Scoring by quarter: 28–26, 16–16, 15–18, 22–29
Pts: Vladimir Lučić 16; Rebs: Danilo Barthel 9 Asts: Maodo Lô 8		Pts: Nathan Boothe 17; Rebs: Rašid Mahalbašić 8 Asts: Larson, Mahalbašić 6

Audi Dome, Munich
Attendance: 0
Referees: Moritz Reiter, Clemens Fritz, Enrico Streit

==== Group B ====
Pos	Team	Pld	W	L	PF	PA	PD	Pts	Qualification
1	Alba Berlin	4	4	0	378	324	+54	8	Quarterfinals
2	MHP Riesen Ludwigsburg	4	3	1	353	324	+29	6	Quarterfinals
3	Brose Bamberg	4	2	2	364	366	−2	4	Quarterfinals
4	Skyliners Frankfurt	4	1	3	295	319	−24	2	Quarterfinals
5	Rasta Vechta	4	0	4	289	346	−57	0	

Source: BBL
Rules for classification: 1) points; 2) head-to-head points; 3) head-to-head points difference; 4) head-to-head number of points scored.

7 June 2020
15:00

Boxscore

Skyliners Frankfurt	72–81	Alba Berlin
Scoring by quarter: 23–16, 16–21, 19–22, 14–22
Pts: Gytis Masiulis 14; Rebs: three players 5 Asts: Joe Rahon 6		Pts: Peyton Siva 16; Rebs: Luke Sikma 10; Asts: Eriksson, Siva 4

Audi Dome, Munich
Attendance: 0
Referees: Toni Rodriguez, Christof Madinger, Steve Bittner

7 June 2020
19:00

Boxscore

Rasta Vechta	76–81	MHP Riesen Ludwigsburg
Scoring by quarter: 20–24, 12–22, 17–16, 27–19
Pts: Simpson, Zyskowski 18; Rebs: Jarosław Zyskowski 8 Asts: Matic Rebec 7		Pts: Thomas Wimbush II 24; Rebs: Cameron Jackson 7 Asts: Marcos Knight 6

Audi Dome, Munich
Attendance: 0
Referees: Anne Panther, Benjamin Barth, Gentian Cici

9 June 2020
16:30

Boxscore

MHP Riesen Ludwigsburg	80–77	Skyliners Frankfurt
Scoring by quarter: 18–16, 19–19, 14–16, 29–26
Pts: Marcos Knight 25; Rebs: Jaleen Smith 6 Asts: Zamal Nixon 4		Pts: Quantez Robertson 17; Rebs: Masiulis, Robertson 7 Asts: Joe Rahon 6

Audi Dome, Munich
Attendance: 0
Referees: Clemens Fritz, Carsten Straube, Moritz Krüper

9 June 2020
20:30

Boxscore

Alba Berlin	98–91	Brose Bamberg
Scoring by quarter: 27–27, 28–29, 20–16, 23–19
Pts: Landry Nnoko 15; Rebs: Johannes Thiemann 10; Asts: Martin Hermannsson 7		Pts: Jordan Crawford 20; Rebs: Assem Marei 7 Asts: Paris Lee 5

Audi Dome, Munich
Attendance: 0
Referees: Anne Panther, Moritz Reiter, Gentian Cici

11 June 2020
16:30

Boxscore

Skyliners Frankfurt	63–59	Rasta Vechta
Scoring by quarter: 15–17, 16–17, 14–10, 18–15
Pts: Yorman Polas Bartolo 16; Rebs: Yorman Polas Bartolo 9 Asts: Joe Rahon 10		Pts: Trevis Simpson 19; Rebs: Ish Wainright 8 Asts: five players 2

Audi Dome, Munich
Attendance: 0
Referees: Moritz Reiter, Gentian Cici, Moritz Krüper

11 June 2020
20:30

Boxscore

MHP Riesen Ludwigsburg	103–74	Brose Bamberg
Scoring by quarter: 25–17, 26–19, 25–20, 27–18
Pts: Thomas Wimbush II 20; Rebs: Weiler-Babb, Wohlfarth-Bottermann 7 Asts: Zamal Nixon 5		Pts: Elias Harris 16; Rebs: Tre McLean 9 Asts: Crawford, Lee 4

Audi Dome, Munich
Attendance: 0
Referees: Anne Panther, Carsten Straube, Steve Bittner

13 June 2020
16:30

Boxscore

Brose Bamberg	99–83	Skyliners Frankfurt
Scoring by quarter: 29–18, 29–18, 26–30, 15–17
Pts: Obasohan, Taylor 13; Rebs: McLean, Sengfelder 6 Asts: Paris Lee 6		Pts: Quantez Robinson 13; Rebs: Gytis Masiulis 6 Asts: Joe Rahon 9

Audi Dome, Munich
Attendance: 0
Referees: Toni Rodriguez, Enrico Streit, Christof Madinger

13 June 2020
20:30

Boxscore

Rasta Vechta	72–102	Alba Berlin
Scoring by quarter: 13–26, 18–32, 19–21, 22–23
Pts: Trevis Simpson 21; Rebs: Herkenhoff, Wainright 6 Asts: Matic Rebec 7		Pts: Peyton Siva 16; Rebs: Landry Nnoko 8 Asts: Peyton Siva 7

Audi Dome, Munich
Attendance: 0
Referees: Carsten Straube, Steve Bittner, Gentian Cici

15 June 2020
16:30

Boxscore

Brose Bamberg	100–82	Rasta Vechta
Scoring by quarter: 32–19, 26–21, 15–21, 27–21
Pts: Jordan Crawford 21; Rebs: Assem Marei 10; Asts: Jordan Crawford 6		Pts: Trevis Simpson 28; Rebs: Ish Wainright 7 Asts: Ish Wainright 6

Audi Dome, Munich
Attendance: 0
Referees: Carsten Straube, Moritz Reiter, Christof Madinger

15 June 2020
20:30

Boxscore

Alba Berlin	97–89	MHP Riesen Ludwigsburg
Scoring by quarter: 24–21, 22–24, 25–22, 26–22
Pts: Eriksson, Sikma 15; Rebs: Luke Sikma 10; Asts: Luke Sikma 10		Pts: Thomas Wimbush II 30; Rebs: Weiler-Babb 11; Asts: Knight, Smith 5

Audi Dome, Munich
Attendance: 0
Referees: Toni Rodriguez, Anne Panther, Steve Bittner

=== Ninth place game ===
16 June 2020
20:30

Boxscore

Crailsheim Merlins	66–95	Rasta Vechta
Scoring by quarter: 13–26, 21–24, 14–18, 18–27
Pts: Sebastian Herrera 21; Rebs: Bleck, Ogunsipe 8 Asts: Sebastian Herrera 6		Pts: Philipp Herkenhoff 18; Rebs: Philipp Herkenhoff 12; Asts: Max DiLeo 8

Audi Dome, Munich
Attendance: 0
Referees: Enrico Streit, Gentian Cici, Moritz Krüper

=== Knockout stage ===
Quarter-finals
ratiopharm Ulm	101	96	197
Skyliners Frankfurt	61	69	130
MHP Riesen Ludwigsburg	87	73	160
Bayern Munich	83	74	157
Alba Berlin	93	88	181
BG Göttingen	68	85	153
EWE Baskets Oldenburg	86	89	175
Brose Bamberg	81	75	156

Semi-finals
ratiopharm Ulm	71	85	156
MHP Riesen Ludwigsburg	71	94	165
Alba Berlin	92	81	173
EWE Baskets Oldenburg	63	59	122

Final
MHP Riesen Ludwigsburg	65	74	139
Alba Berlin	88	75	163

==== Quarterfinals ====
===== Overview =====
Team 1	Agg.	Team 2	1st leg	2nd leg
ratiopharm Ulm	197–130	Skyliners Frankfurt	101–61	96–69
MHP Riesen Ludwigsburg	160–157	Bayern Munich	87–83	73–74
Alba Berlin	181–153	BG Göttingen	93–68	88–85
EWE Baskets Oldenburg	175–156	Brose Bamberg	86–81	89–75

===== Matches =====
17 June 2020
16:30

Boxscore

Skyliners Frankfurt	61–101	ratiopharm Ulm
Scoring by quarter: 15–36, 15–21, 16–31, 15–13
Pts: Yorman Polas Bartolo 10; Rebs: Gytis Masiulis 4 Asts: Joe Rahon 4		Pts: Dylan Osetkowski 18; Rebs: Gavin Schilling 8 Asts: Archie Goodwin 6

Audi Dome, Munich
Attendance: 0
Referees: Anne Panther, Clemens Fritz, Benjamin Barth

19 June 2020
20:30

Boxscore

ratiopharm Ulm	96–69	Skyliners Frankfurt
Scoring by quarter: 23–20, 24–28, 26–15, 23–6
Pts: Dylan Osetkowski 20; Rebs: Dylan Osetkowski 10; Asts: Thomas Klepeisz 8		Pts: Masiulis, Polas 14; Rebs: Gytis Masiulis 8 Asts: Joe Rahon 9

Audi Dome, Munich
Attendance: 0
Referees: Moritz Reiter, Enrico Streit, Moritz Krüper

Ulm won 197–130 on aggregate.

17 June 2020
20:30

Boxscore

Bayern Munich	83–87	MHP Riesen Ludwigsburg
Scoring by quarter: 15–21, 27–15, 23–23, 18–28
Pts: Danilo Barthel 20; Rebs: Bray, Lučić 5 Asts: Barthel, Lô 4		Pts: Hans Brase 18; Rebs: Marcos Knight 11; Asts: Jaleen Smith 6

Audi Dome, Munich
Attendance: 0
Referees: Moritz Reiter, Toni Rodriguez, Christof Madinger

19 June 2020
16:30

Boxscore

MHP Riesen Ludwigsburg	73–74	Bayern Munich
Scoring by quarter: 18–23, 18–22, 16–11, 21–18
Pts: Marcos Knight 20; Rebs: Marcos Knight 10; Asts: Marcos Knight 4		Pts: Paul Zipser 16; Rebs: Paul Zipser 9 Asts: Maodo Lô 7

Audi Dome, Munich
Attendance: 0
Referees: Anne Panther, Clemens Fritz, Steve Bittner

Ludwigsburg won 160–157 on aggregate.

18 June 2020
16:30

Boxscore

BG Göttingen	68–93	Alba Berlin
Scoring by quarter: 17–23, 12–29, 11–29, 28–12
Pts: Mihajlo Andrić 11; Rebs: Dennis Kramer 8 Asts: Alex Ruoff 8		Pts: Peyton Siva 15; Rebs: four players 6 Asts: Peyton Siva 6

Audi Dome, Munich
Attendance: 0
Referees: Carsten Straube, Moritz Krüper, Enrico Streit

20 June 2020
20:30

Boxscore

Alba Berlin	88–85	BG Göttingen
Scoring by quarter: 22–16, 30–15, 21–26, 15–28
Pts: Martin Hermannsson 19; Rebs: Landry Nnoko 9 Asts: Martin Hermannsson 7		Pts: Dominic Lockhart 19; Rebs: Marvin Omuvwie 6 Asts: Alex Ruoff 7

Audi Dome, Munich
Attendance: 0
Referees: Toni Rodriguez, Christof Madinger, Gentian Cici

Berlin won 181–153 on aggregate.

18 June 2020
20:30

Boxscore

Brose Bamberg	81–86	EWE Baskets Oldenburg
Scoring by quarter: 15–24, 18–21, 21–20, 27–21
Pts: Elias Harris 24; Rebs: Kameron Taylor 8 Asts: Paris Lee 6		Pts: Rickey Paulding 20; Rebs: Rašid Mahalbašić 10; Asts: Braydon Hobbs 6

Audi Dome, Munich
Attendance: 0
Referees: Toni Rodriguez, Steve Bittner, Gentian Cici

20 June 2020
16:30

Boxscore

EWE Baskets Oldenburg	89–75	Brose Bamberg
Scoring by quarter: 24–19, 27–23, 21–14, 17–15
Pts: Ian Hummer 21; Rebs: Ian Hummer 9 Asts: Hobbs, Mahalbašić 5		Pts: Kameron Taylor 20; Rebs: Christian Sengfelder 9 Asts: Kameron Taylor 4

Audi Dome, Munich
Attendance: 0
Referees: Anne Panther, Benjamin Barth, Carsten Straube

Oldenburg won 175–156 on aggregate.

==== Semifinals ====
===== Overview =====
Team 1	Agg.	Team 2	1st leg	2nd leg
ratiopharm Ulm	156–165	MHP Riesen Ludwigsburg	71–71	85–94
Alba Berlin	173–122	EWE Baskets Oldenburg	92–63	81–59

===== Matches =====
21 June 2020
15:00

Boxscore

MHP Riesen Ludwigsburg	71–71	ratiopharm Ulm
Scoring by quarter: 21–14, 15–20, 16–22, 19–15
Pts: Marcos Knight 24; Rebs: Marcos Knight 11; Asts: Jaleen Smith 6		Pts: Derek Willis 19; Rebs: Derek Willis 14; Asts: Per Günther 4

Audi Dome, Munich
Attendance: 0
Referees: Moritz Reiter, Christof Madinger, Clemens Fritz

23 June 2020
20:30

Boxscore

ratiopharm Ulm	85–94	MHP Riesen Ludwigsburg
Scoring by quarter: 24–16, 22–26, 23–29, 16–23
Pts: Archie Goodwin 19; Rebs: three players 6 Asts: Archie Goodwin 5		Pts: Marcos Knight 26; Rebs: Marcos Knight 13; Asts: Jaleen Smith 4

Audi Dome, Munich
Attendance: 0
Referees: Moritz Reiter, Clemens Fritz, Christof Madinger

Ludwigsburg won 165–156 on aggregate.

22 June 2020
20:30

Boxscore

EWE Baskets Oldenburg	63–92	Alba Berlin
Scoring by quarter: 17–22, 16–27, 12–23, 18–29
Pts: Rašid Mahalbašić 23; Rebs: Rašid Mahalbašić 9 Asts: Braydon Hobbs 7		Pts: Peyton Siva 19; Rebs: Luke Sikma 10; Asts: Martin Hermannsson 6

Audi Dome, Munich
Attendance: 0
Referees: Anne Panther, Toni Rodriguez, Steve Bittner

24 June 2020
20:30

Boxscore

Alba Berlin	81–59	EWE Baskets Oldenburg
Scoring by quarter: 17–15, 24–19, 24–11, 16–14
Pts: Kenneth Ogbe 16; Rebs: Johannes Thiemann 12; Asts: Martin Hermannsson 6		Pts: Rickey Paulding 11; Rebs: Filip Stanić 5 Asts: Tyler Larson 5

Audi Dome, Munich
Attendance: 0
Referees: Toni Rodriguez, Anne Panther, Steve Bittner

Berlin won 173–122 on aggregate.

==== Final ====
===== Overview =====
Team 1	Agg.	Team 2	1st leg	2nd leg
MHP Riesen Ludwigsburg	139–163	Alba Berlin	65–88	74–75

===== Matches =====
26 June 2020
20:30

Boxscore

Alba Berlin	88–65	MHP Riesen Ludwigsburg
Scoring by quarter: 19–13, 27–16, 23–13, 19–23
Pts: Hermannsson, Giedraitis 14; Rebs: Landry Nnoko 7 Asts: Martin Hermannsson 6		Pts: Weiler-Babb, Wohlfarth-Bottermann 11; Rebs: Weiler-Babb, Wohlfarth-Bottermann 6 Asts: Jaleen Smith 8

Audi Dome, Munich
Attendance: 0
Referees: Moritz Reiter, Clemens Fritz, Christof Madinger

28 June 2020
15:00

Boxscore

MHP Riesen Ludwigsburg	74–75	Alba Berlin
Scoring by quarter: 11–21, 24–21, 19–25, 20–8
Pts: Thomas Wimbush II 19; Rebs: Nick Weiler-Babb 11; Asts: Jaleen Smith 6		Pts: Giffey, Hermannsson 14; Rebs: Luke Sikma 7 Asts: Luke Sikma 7

Audi Dome, Munich
Attendance: 0
Referees: Toni Rodriguez, Anne Panther, Steve Bittner

Berlin won 163–139 on aggregate.

== Awards and statistics ==
=== Major award winners ===
Only the Finals MVP was recorded, all other awards were cancelled.

Award	Player	Club
Finals MVP	(United States) Marcos Knight	Riesen Ludwigsburg

=== Statistics ===
The statistics account for the regular season before it was suspended on matchday 23.

Category	Player	Club	Average
Points	(United States) Scott Eatherton	Löwen Braunschweig	17.7
Rebounds	(United States) Scott Eatherton	Löwen Braunschweig	8.2
Assists	(Serbia) Jovan Novak	Mitteldeutscher BC	8.9
Steals	(United States) Quantez Robertson	Skyliners Frankfurt	2.1
Blocks	(United States) Ian Hummer	Baskets Oldenburg	2.0
Efficiency	(United States) Scott Eatherton	Löwen Braunschweig	22.2

== See also ==
- 2019–20 BBL-Pokal

== German clubs in European competitions ==
Team	Competition	Progress
Bayern Munich	EuroLeague	Regular season
Alba Berlin	EuroLeague	Regular season
EWE Baskets Oldenburg	EuroCup	Top 16
ratiopharm Ulm	EuroCup	Regular season
Rasta Vechta	Champions League	Regular season
Brose Bamberg	Champions League	Regular season
Telekom Baskets Bonn	Champions League	Round of 16
medi Bayreuth	FIBA Europe Cup	Semifinals
