= Martin Hermannsson =

Icelandic basketball player

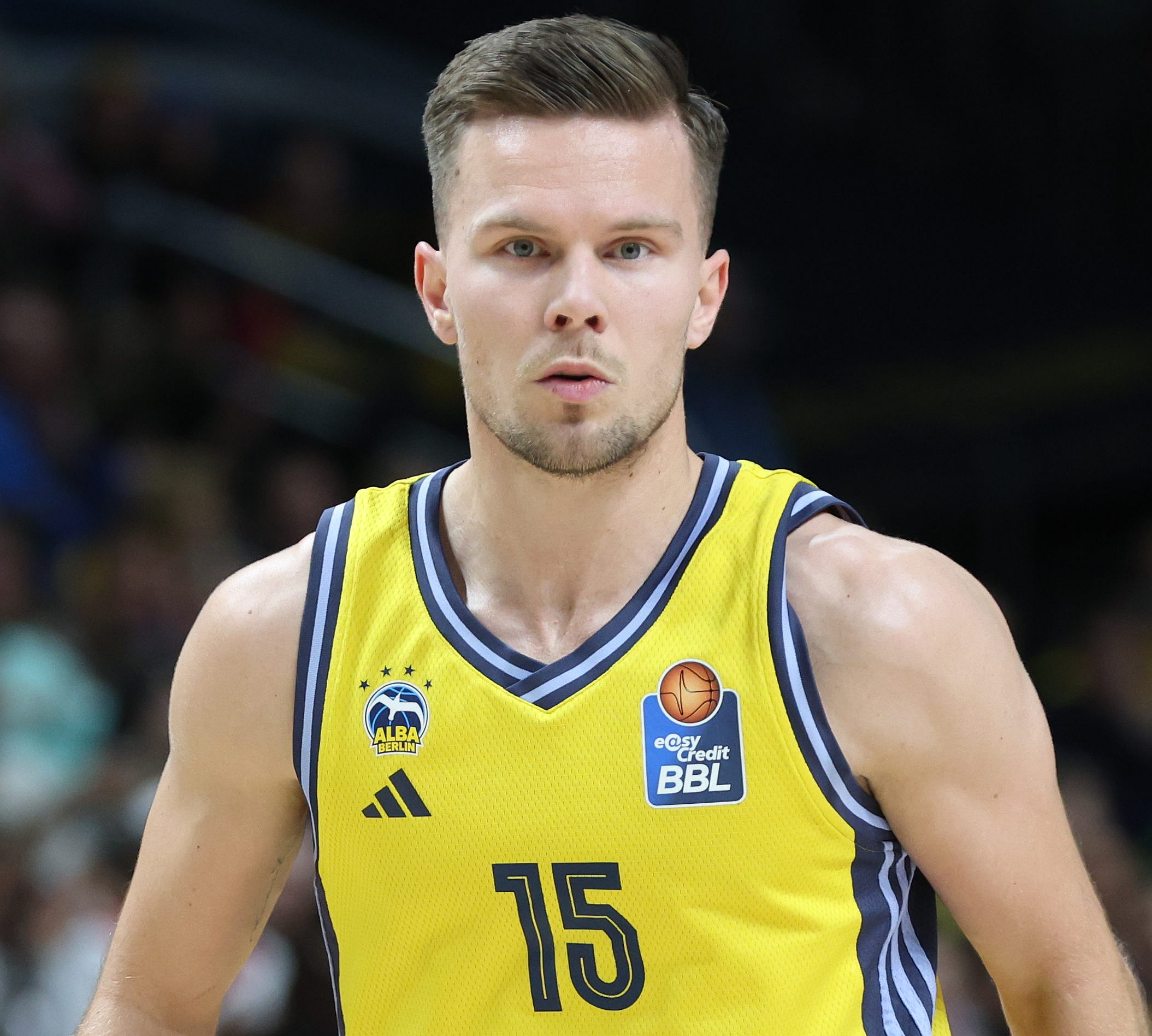
- Hermannsson with Alba Berlin in 2024

No. 15 – Alba Berlin
- Position: Point guard / shooting guard
- League: BBL

Personal information
- Born: 16 September 1994 (age 32) Reykjavík, Iceland
- Listed height: 1.90 m (6 ft 3 in)
- Listed weight: 77 kg (170 lb)

Career information
- College: LIU Brooklyn (2014–2016)
- Playing career: 2009–present

Career history
- 2009–2014: KR
- 2009: →KR-b
- 2016–2017: Étoile Charleville-Mézières
- 2017–2018: Champagne Châlons-Reims
- 2018–2020: Alba Berlin
- 2020–2024: Valencia
- 2024–present: Alba Berlin

Career highlights
- 2× Bundesliga champion (2020, 2026); All-Bundesliga Second Team (2020); German Cup winner (2020); German Cup Finals MVP (2020); 5× Icelandic Basketball Player of the Year (2016–2020); 2× Icelandic League champion (2011, 2014); Icelandic Cup winner (2011); Úrvalsdeild Playoffs MVP (2014); Úrvalsdeild Domestic Player of the Year (2014); All-Úrvalsdeild Domestic First Team (2014); Úrvalsdeild Young Player of the Year (2014); All-LNB Pro B First Team (2017)

Martin Hermannsson (born 16 September 1994) is an Icelandic professional basketball player for Alba Berlin of the German Basketball Bundesliga (BBL). He also internationally represents the Icelandic national basketball team, with which he participated in the EuroBasket 2015, EuroBasket 2017 and EuroBasket 2025. In 2019, Martin was named the Icelandic Men's Basketball Player of the Year for the fourth year in a row.

== Playing career ==
Martin started his senior team career with KR at the age of 15. With KR, he went on to win the Icelandic championship twice, in 2011 and 2014. In 2014 he was named the Domestic Player of the Year, the Playoffs MVP and the Young Player of the Year while also being selected to the Domestic All-First Team.

On 17 May 2017, he was selected for the LNB Pro B All-First Team and was the runner-up to the Most Valuable Player award. He switched to Champagne Châlons-Reims Basket of the LNB Pro A for the 2017–18 season.

On 29 June 2018, Martin signed with Alba Berlin of the Basketball Bundesliga. On 7 November, he injured his ankle in Alba's 106–101 victory against Tofaş in the EuroCup and was expected to miss 6 weeks. He returned from injury on 27 December, scoring a game high 19 points in only 20 minutes, in Alba's 108–96 victory against Giessen 46ers. On 22 January 2019, Martin scored 17 straight points in the third quarter in against Rytas Vilnius in the EuroCup, helping Alba cut the lead from 21 points to 4 points. He scored 20 of his 25 points in the second half, including three free throws with 0.9 seconds remaining that gave Alba an 87–85 victory. On 17 February, he had 6 points and 6 assists in Alba's narrow 82–83 loss against Brose Bamberg in the German Basketball Cup Finals. In June 2019, Martin and Alba lost to Bayern Munich in the Bundesliga finals 0–3.

In December 2019, Martin was named the Icelandic Men's Basketball Player of the Year for the fourth straight season. He finished second in the vote for the Icelandic Sportsperson of the Year. On 17 January 2020, he scored 6 of his 13 points in overtime in a victory against Red Star Belgrade. On 17 February 2020, he led all scorers with 20 points in Alba's 89–67 victory against EWE Baskets Oldenburg in the German Basketball Cup finals. On 28 June 2020, Martin won the Basketball Bundesliga championship with Alba Berlin.

On 9 July 2020 Martin signed with Valencia of the Spanish Liga ACB.

On 16 December 2020, Martin was named the Icelandic Male Basketball Player of the Year for the fifth straight year.

On 30 May 2022, Martin tore his ACL in a Liga ACB playoffs match against Saski Baskonia.

On 1 July 2022, Martin renewed his contract with Valencia for an additional two seasons.

On 10 January 2024, Martin returned to Alba Berlin after four years. In 2026, he won the Bundesliga for the second time in his career.

== Career statistics ==
Legend
GP	Games played	GS	Games started	MPG	Minutes per game
FG%	Field-goal percentage	3P%	3-point field-goal percentage	FT%	Free-throw percentage
RPG	Rebounds per game	APG	Assists per game	SPG	Steals per game
BPG	Blocks per game	PPG	Points per game	PIR	Performance index rating
**Bold**	Career high

=== EuroLeague ===
Year	Team	GP	GS	MPG	FG%	3P%	FT%	RPG	APG	SPG	BPG	PPG	PIR
2019–20	Alba Berlin	27	**20**	**25.7**	.410	.337	.860	**1.6**	**4.8**	.5	.0	**10.9**	**8.5**
2020–21	Valencia	**29**	0	17.7	.435	**.383**	.870	1.5	3.4	.5	.0	6.9	7.8
2022–23	Valencia	4	0	6.8	.429	.250	—	—	1.3	.5	**.3**	1.8	2.0
2023–24	Valencia	4	0	10.0	**.556**	.000	**1.000**	.8	1.8	—	—	3.0	2.3
2023–24	Alba Berlin	12	10	20.3	.403	.348	**1.000**	1.5	4.2	**.8**	.2	7.2	7.3
Career		76	30	20.0	.419	.344	.885	1.4	3.8	.5	.1	7.9	7.4

=== EuroCup ===
Year	Team	GP	GS	MPG	FG%	3P%	FT%	RPG	APG	SPG	BPG	PPG	PIR
2018–19	Alba Berlin	**20**	**17**	**25.5**	**.476**	.414	.855	**1.7**	4.7	**.9**	—	**12.7**	**12.8**
2021–22	Valencia	**20**	**17**	22.2	.463	**.439**	**.960**	1.0	**5.3**	.7	**.1**	8.7	9.8
Career		40	34	23.8	.470	.425	.888	1.4	5.0	.8	.0	10.7	11.3

=== Domestic leagues ===
Year	Team	League	GP	MPG	FG%	3P%	FT%	RPG	APG	SPG	BPG	PPG
2010–11	(Iceland) KR	ÚK	11	2.9	.333	.200	.833	.2	.1	—	—	0.6
2011–12	(Iceland) KR	ÚK	26	16.6	.366	.288	.778	2.0	1.4	.5	.1	5.5
2012–13	(Iceland) KR	ÚK	28	27.8	.433	.339	.791	3.1	3.8	1.3	.1	14.5
2013–14	(Iceland) KR	ÚK	32	31.5	.493	.436	.813	3.4	4.5	1.9	.3	18.8
2016–17	(France) Charleville	Pro B	34	32.8	.471	.355	.869	3.6	5.7	1.2	.1	17.1
2017–18	(France) Châlons-Reims	Pro A	34	32.5	.441	.423	.855	2.8	5.7	.9	—	13.9
2018–19	(Germany) Alba Berlin	BBL	30	23.7	.494	.389	.760	1.8	3.6	.7	—	11.6
2019–20	(Germany) Alba Berlin	BBL	27	23.7	.464	.370	.861	2.1	6.1	.9	—	12.4
2020–21	(Spain) Valencia	ACB	38	16.9	.447	.397	.914	1.5	2.9	.6	—	7.3
2021–22	(Spain) Valencia	ACB	30	22.1	.458	.340	.855	1.7	3.7	.8	—	10.3
2022–23	(Spain) Valencia	ACB	14	15.7	.328	.242	.857	1.1	2.7	.6	.1	4.0
2023–24	(Spain) Valencia	ACB	3	14.3	.467	.250	—	.7	.3	1.7	—	5.3
2023–24	(Germany) Alba Berlin	BBL	26	23.0	.414	.304	.864	1.6	5.0	.8	.0	9.3

=== National team ===
Team	Tournament	Pos.	GP	PPG	RPG	APG
Iceland	EuroBasket 2015	24th	5	4.6	1.8	1.2
Iceland	EuroBasket 2017	24th	5	12.8	4.0	3.6
Iceland	EuroBasket 2025	22nd	5	12.6	3.0	4.8

=== College ===
Year	Team	GP	GS	MPG	FG%	3P%	FT%	RPG	APG	SPG	BPG	PPG
2014–15	LIU	30	30	31.2	.391	.275	.864	3.8	3.3	.9	.2	10.1
2015–16	LIU	31	31	36.2	.458	.360	.882	4.4	4.7	1.8	.3	16.2
Career		61	61	33.8	.431	.322	.875	4.1	4.0	1.3	.2	13.2

== National team career ==
Martin debuted with the Icelandic national team during the 2013 Games of the Small States of Europe where the team finished third. With Iceland, he participated at the EuroBasket 2015 and EuroBasket 2017. On 10 August 2019, Martin scored the game winning basket with 0.7 seconds left in Iceland's 83–82 victory against Switzerland in the EuroBasket 2021 qualification. 20 seconds earlier had had also given Iceland temporally the lead with a difficult shot over Switzerland's Clint Capela at the shot clock buzzer.

== Personal life ==
Martin is the son of former Icelandic national team player Hermann Hauksson.

== Popular culture ==
- Martin: Saga úr Vesturbæ is a 2017 documentary by Bjartur Sigurðsson about Martin's life and basketball career.
