= Marcos Knight =

American basketball player (born 1989)

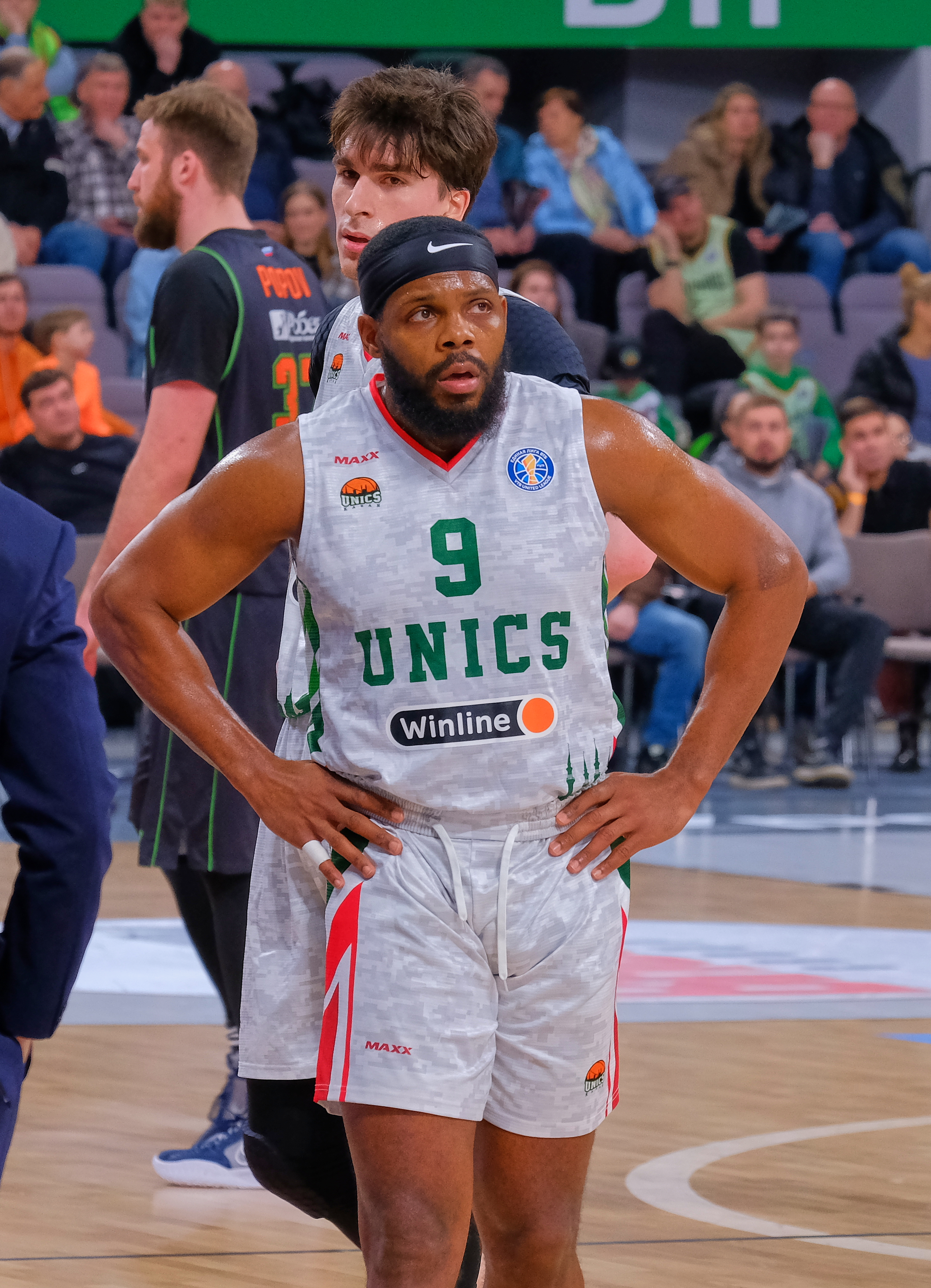
- Marcos with UNICS Kazan in 2025

No. 9 – Lokomotiv Kuban
- Position: Point guard
- League: VTB United League

Personal information
- Born: September 24, 1989 (age 37) Dublin, Georgia, U.S.
- Listed height: 6 ft 2 in (1.88 m)
- Listed weight: 205 lb (93 kg)

Career information
- High school: West Laurens (Dublin, Georgia)
- College: Chipola (2009–2011); Middle Tennessee (2011–2013)
- NBA draft: 2013: undrafted
- Playing career: 2013–present

Career history
- 2013–2015: Baunach Young Pikes
- 2015–2016: USC Heidelberg
- 2016–2017: Science City Jena
- 2017: Zaragoza
- 2017–2019: Afyon Belediye
- 2019–2020: Riesen Ludwigsburg
- 2020–2021: AS Monaco
- 2021–2022: ASVEL
- 2022–2023: Samara
- 2023–2025: UNICS Kazan
- 2025: Al Ahli Tripoli
- 2025: Al Ahly Benghazi
- 2026: Shanxi Loongs
- 2026–present: Lokomotiv Kuban

Career highlights
- EuroCup champion (2021); VTB United League champion (2023); VTB United League Sixth Man of the Year (2025); LNB Élite champion (2022); Bundesliga Finals MVP (2020)

Marcos Shyderrick Knight (born September 24, 1989) is an American professional basketball player for Lokomotiv Kuban of the VTB United League. He played college basketball for the Chipola Indians and the Middle Tennessee Blue Raiders. Listed at 6 feet 2 inches (1.88 m), he plays the point guard position.

== College career ==
After attending West Laurens High School in Dublin, Georgia, Knight spent one year each at junior colleges Middle Georgia (2009–10) and Chipola (2010–11). For his sophomore year, he transferred to Middle Tennessee State University. In his two years with the Blue Raiders (2011–13), Knight saw the court in a total of 68 games to average 12.2 points, 5.5 rebounds, 2.7 assists as well as 1.2 steals per outing. He garnered All-Sun Belt 1st Team honors and NABC Division I All-District 24 1st Team distinction as a senior.

== Professional career ==
=== Baunach Young Pikes (2013–2015) ===
Coming out of college, Knight worked out with NBA teams Charlotte Bobcats and Brooklyn Nets. He signed with Baunach Young Pikes of the German third-tier league ProB in November 2013. Averaging 17.5 points, 6.0 rebounds and 2.6 assists per game, he led the team to the ProB finals and to promotion to the ProA, the second highest level of basketball in Germany. After being handed a contract extension for the 2014–15 season, he continued producing for the Baunach team, scoring 15.3 points to go along with 5.9 boards and 2.6 assists per contest on the season.

=== USC Heidelberg (2015–2016) ===
He started the 2015–16 campaign playing for USC Heidelberg and then took up an offer from fellow ProA side Science City Jena. The move did not happen without controversy, as the Heidelberg team accused him of trying to force the transfer by staying away from practice.

=== Science City Jena (2016–2017) ===
After an agreement had been reached, Knight signed with Jena in January 2016. In the following months, he helped the Jena squad win the ProA championship, which earned them promotion to the German top-flight Basketball Bundesliga and was named ProA Player of the Year (by eurobasket.com).

In 2016–17, he stood out as Jena's leading scorer, averaging 18.1 points a game in 25 Bundesliga contests, while pulling down 6.4 rebounds and dishing out 3.0 assists a game.

=== Zaragoza (2017) ===
In April 2017, he signed to finish the season with Spanish Liga ACB side Basket Zaragoza 2002. Featuring in six ACB contests until the end of the 2016–17 campaign, he scored 11.2 points a game, while pulling down 6.2 rebounds and handing out 2.2 assists per outing.

=== Afyon Belediye (2017–2019) ===
On July 10, 2017, Knight signed with Afyon Belediye of the Turkish Basketball First League. With Afyon, he was promoted to the first-tier Basketbol Süper Ligi (BSL) after winning the promotion playoffs. He re-signed for the 2018–19 season.

=== Riesen Ludwigsburg (2019–2020) ===
In January 2019, he moved back to Germany, joining MHP Riesen Ludwigsburg. In the 2019–20 season, Knight made it to the German Bundesliga finals with Ludwigsburg, but missed the finals due to injury. His team lost to Alba Berlin, however, Knight was named Most Valuable Player of the Bundesliga finals tournament. He averaged 16.5 points, 5.9 rebounds, 3.2 assists and 1.6 steals per game throughout the 2019–20 Bundesliga campaign.

=== AS Monaco (2020–2021) ===
On July 24, 2020, he signed with AS Monaco. Knight parted ways with the team on September 1, 2021.

=== ASVEL (2021–2022) ===
On November 12, 2021, he was signed by ASVEL to replace the injured David Lighty. Knight extended his contract on February 3, 2022, until the end of the season.

=== Samara (2022–2023) ===
On July 28, 2022, he signed with BC Samara of the VTB United League.

=== UNICS Kazan (2023–2025) ===
On March 23, 2023, Knight signed with UNICS Kazan of the VTB United League.

=== Al Ahli Tripoli (2025) ===
In September 2025, he played with Libyan club Al Ahli Tripoli at the 2025 FIBA Intercontinental Cup, where the team won a bronze medal, becoming the first African team in history to finish on the podium.

=== Shanxi Loongs (2026) ===
On January 1, 2026, Knight signed with Shanxi Loongs of the Chinese Basketball Associaton (CBA).

=== Lokomotiv Kuban (2026–present) ===
On August 9, 2026, Knight signed with Lokomotiv Kuban of the VTB United League.

=== The Basketball Tournament ===
In 2017, Knight participated in The Basketball Tournament for Blue Zoo, a team of Middle Tennessee alumni. The team lost in the first round of the tournament. The Basketball Tournament is an annual $2 million winner-take-all tournament broadcast on ESPN.
