= Marvin Ogunsipe =

Austrian basketball player

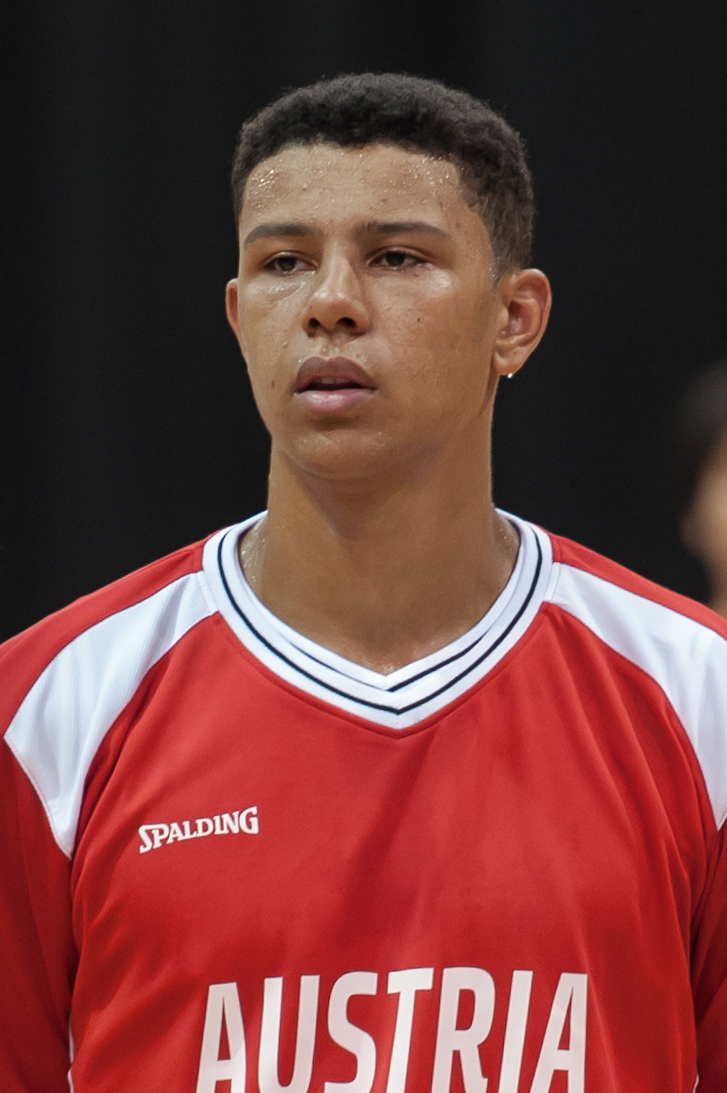
- Ogunsipe in 2015 with Austria

No. 26 – Würzburg Baskets
- Position: Center / power forward
- League: Basketball Bundesliga

Personal information
- Born: February 26, 1996 (age 30) Vienna, Austria
- Listed height: 2.04 m (6 ft 8 in)
- Listed weight: 104 kg (229 lb)

Career information
- Playing career: 2016–present

Career history
- 2017–2022: Bayern Munich
- 2019–2020: →Hamburg Towers
- 2020: →Crailsheim Merlins
- 2020–2021: →Hamburg Towers
- 2022–2023: Almansa
- 2023–2024: Força Lleida
- 2024: HLA Alicante
- 2024–2025: Club Ourense
- 2025–2026: Crailsheim Merlins
- 2026–present: Würzburg Baskets

Marvin Ogunsipe (born February 26, 1996) is an Austrian professional basketball player for Würzburg Baskets of the German Basketball Bundesliga (BBL). Internationally, he represents Austria, but has also held German citizenship since 2018.

== Professional career ==
Before signing with Bayern Munich in 2014, Ogunsipe played with Vienna DC Timberwolves. Ogunsipe made his debut for Bayern on February 12, 2017, in a 56–80 win against Alba Berlin in which he scored 2 points.

Ogunsipe was sent on loan to the Hamburg Towers for the 2019–20 season. On May 11, 2020, he was loaned to Crailsheim Merlins for 2019–20 season playoffs. On August 17, 2020, he was loaned again to Hamburg Towers for one more year.

On July 9, 2021, Bayern Munich announced that Marvin Ogunsipe would return to Bayern München after his years on loan. He would play rarely however, and for the start of the new season, moved to CB Almansa.

On June 23, 2025, he signed with Crailsheim Merlins of the German ProA for a second stint.
