= Basketball Bundesliga Finals MVP =

German basketball award

The Basketball Bundesliga Finals MVP (German: Wertvollster Spieler der Finalserie) is an annual Basketball Bundesliga (BBL) award given since the 2004–05 season to the league's most valuable player in the Finals of the league.

== Winners ==
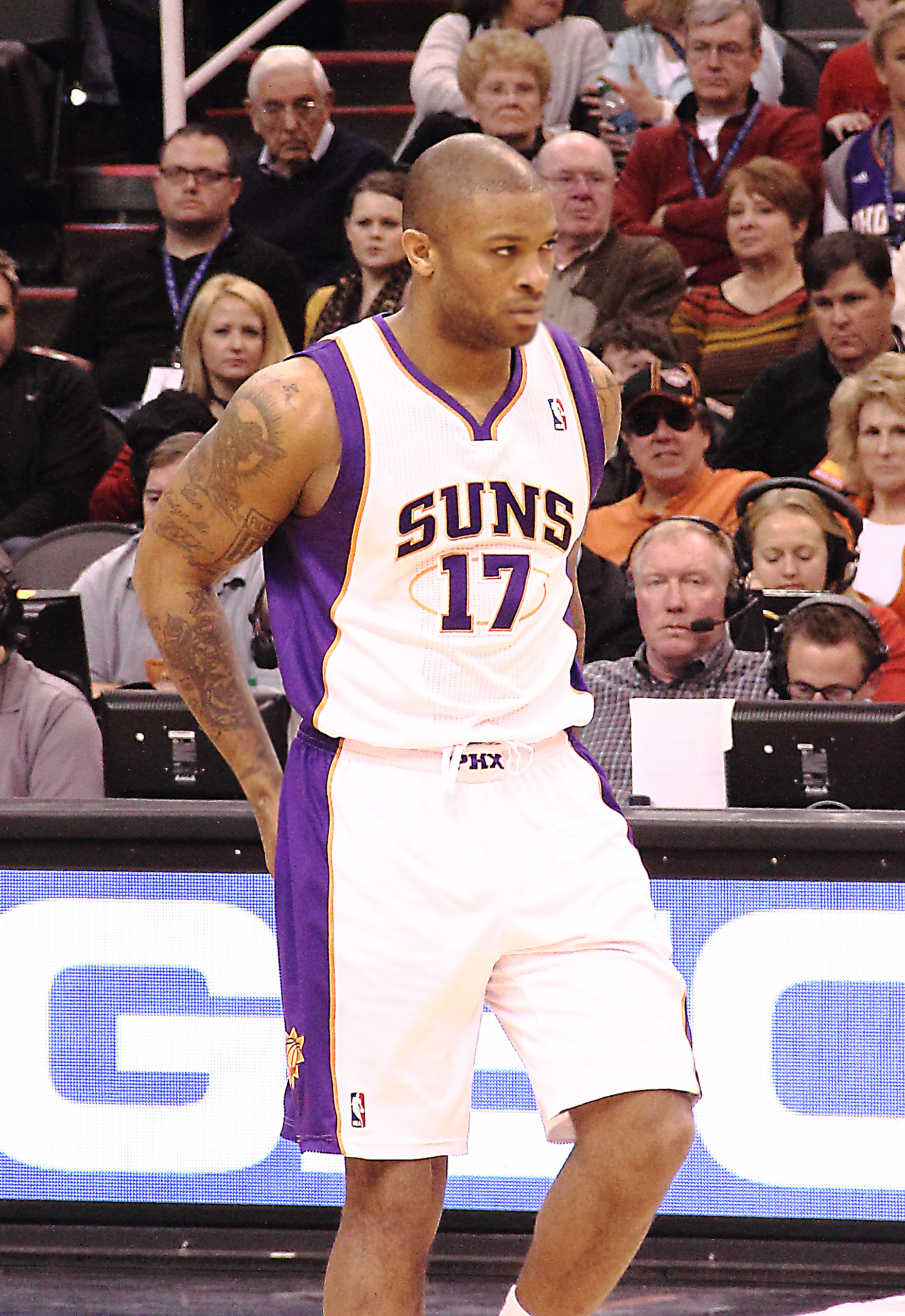
P. J. Tucker won the award in 2012

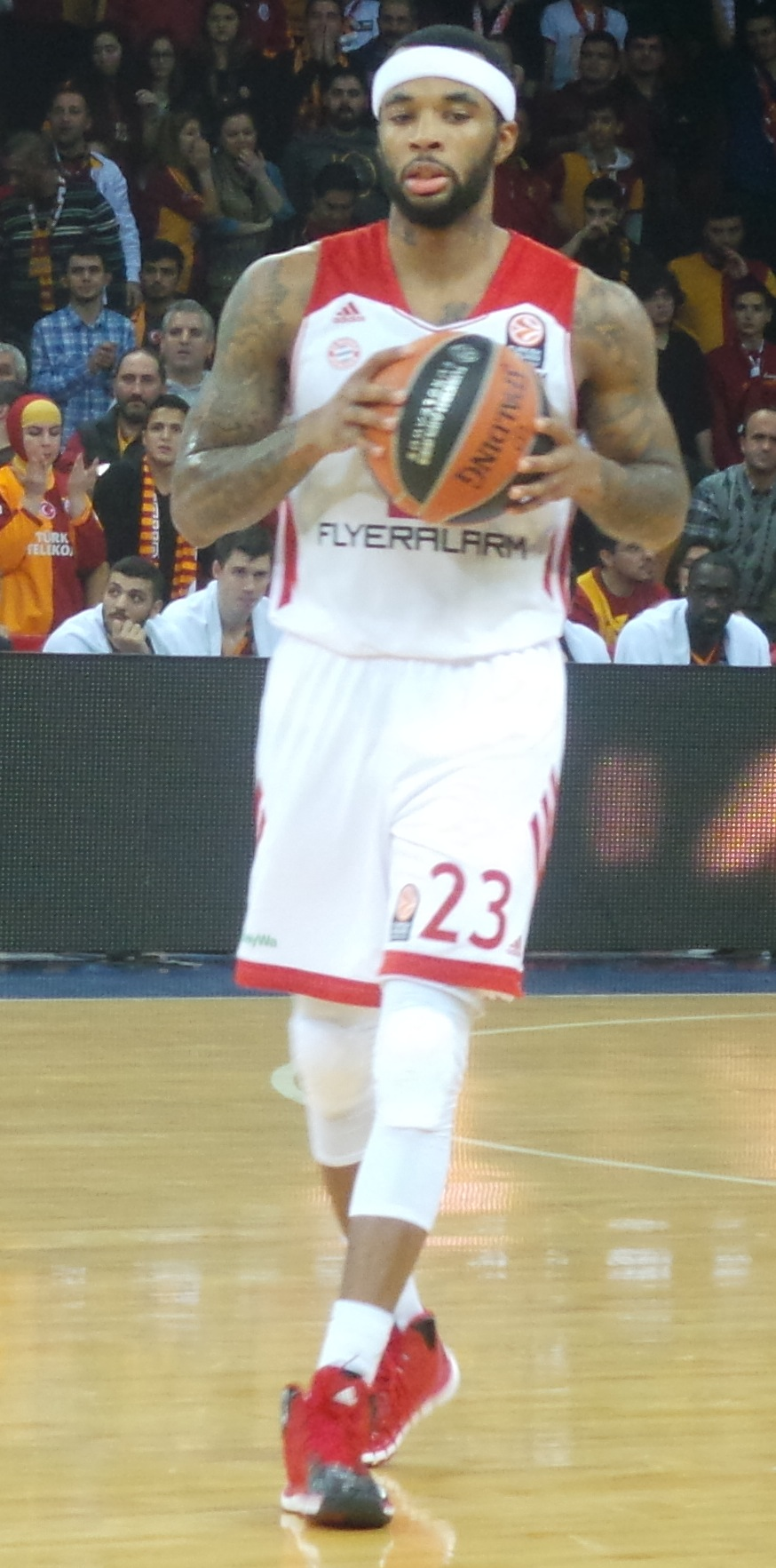
Malcolm Delaney was the BBL Finals MVP in 2014

^	Denotes player who is still active in the BBL
*	Inducted into the FIBA Hall of Fame
Player (X)	Denotes the number of times the player has received the award

Season	Player	Position	Nationality	Team	Ref(s)
2004–05	Chris Williams	Forward	United States	Fraport Skyliners	
2005–06	Immanuel McElroy	Guard	United States	RheinEnergie Köln	
2006–07	Casey Jacobsen	Forward	United States	Brose Baskets	
2007–08	Julius Jenkins	Guard	United States	ALBA Berlin	
2008–09	Rickey Paulding	Guard/forward	United States	EWE Baskets Oldenburg	
2009–10	Casey Jacobsen (2)	Forward	United States	Brose Baskets	
2010–11	Kyle Hines	Center	United States	Brose Baskets	
2011–12	P. J. Tucker	Forward	United States	Brose Baskets	
2012–13	Anton Gavel	Guard	Germany (Note: Anton Gavel, born in Košice, Slovakia, also owns Slovak nationality.)	Brose Baskets	
2013–14	Malcolm Delaney	Guard	United States	Bayern Munich	
2014–15	Brad Wanamaker	Guard	United States	Brose Baskets	
2015–16	Darius Miller	Forward	United States	Brose Baskets	
2016–17	Fabien Causeur	Guard	France	Brose Bamberg	
2017–18	Danilo Barthel	Forward/center	Germany	Bayern Munich	
2018–19	Nihad Đedović	Guard/forward	Bosnia and Herzegovina	Bayern Munich	
2019–20	Marcos Knight	Guard	United States	Riesen Ludwigsburg (Note: Marcos Knight was the first Final MVP to be on the losing team, as Alba Berlin took the title over Riesen Ludwigsburg in 2020.)	
2020–21	Jayson Granger	Guard	Uruguay	Alba Berlin	
2021–22	Johannes Thiemann^	Forward/center	Germany	Alba Berlin	
2022–23	Yago dos Santos	Point guard	Brazil	Ratiopharm Ulm	
2023–24	Carsen Edwards^	Point guard	United States	Bayern Munich	
2024–25	Shabazz Napier^	Point guard	United States	Bayern Munich	
2025–26	Justin Bean^	Forward	United States	Alba Berlin	
