= Nathan Boothe =

American professional basketball player

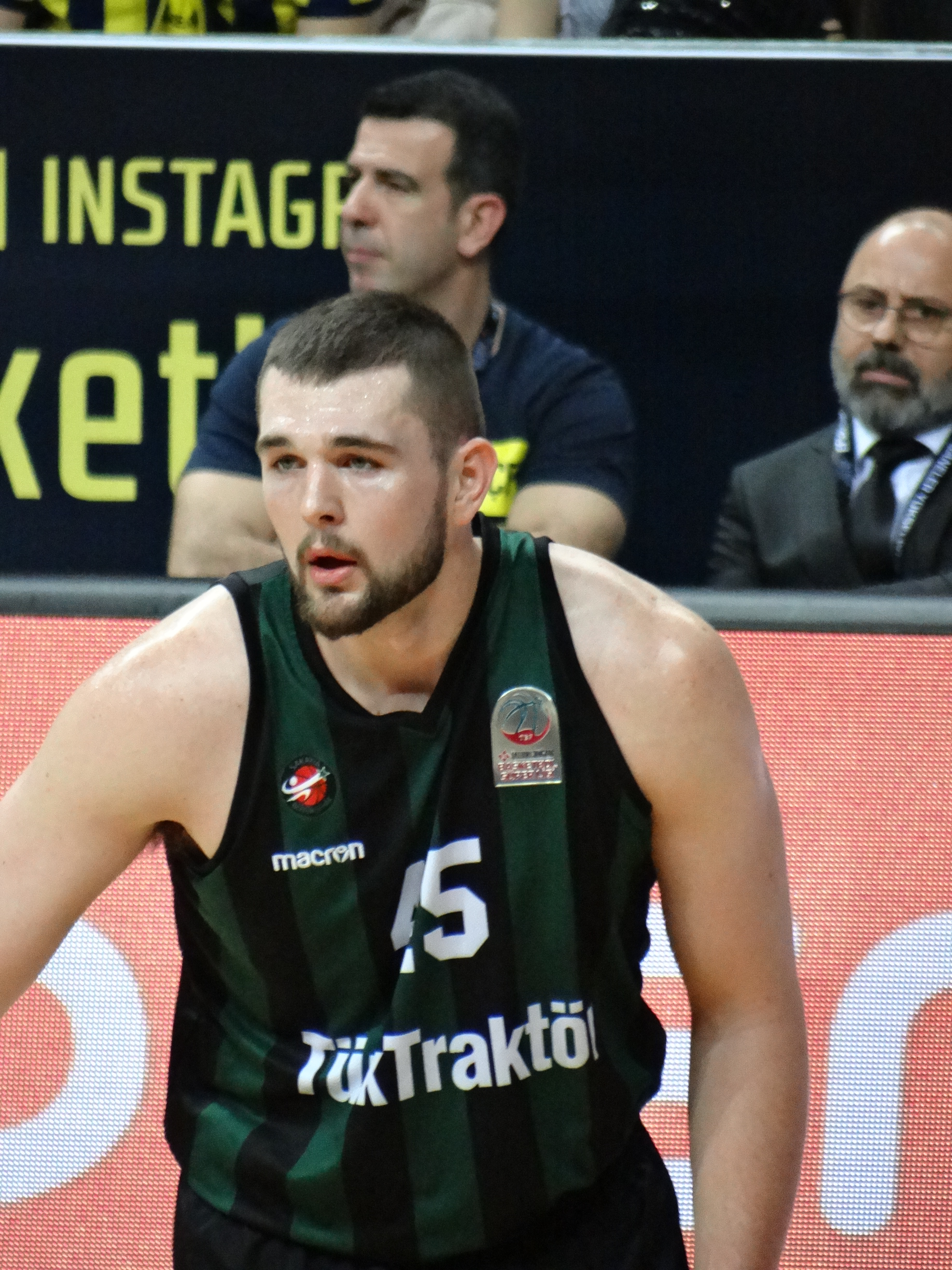
- Boothe playing for Sakarya Büyükşehir in 2018

No. 45 – Sendai 89ers
- Position: Power forward / center
- League: B.League

Personal information
- Born: February 3, 1994 (age 32) Oak Park, Illinois, U.S.
- Listed height: 6 ft 9 in (2.06 m)
- Listed weight: 240 lb (109 kg)

Career information
- High school: Warren (Gurnee, Illinois)
- College: Toledo (2012–2016)
- NBA draft: 2016: undrafted
- Playing career: 2016–present

Career history
- 2016–2017: Flexx Pistoia
- 2017–2018: Sakarya BB
- 2018–2021: Oldenburg
- 2021–2022: Darüşşafaka
- 2022–present: Sendai 89ers

Career highlights
- All-German Bundesliga Second Team (2020); First team All-MAC (2016)

Nathan Newman Boothe (born February 3, 1994) is an American professional basketball player for Sendai 89ers of the B.League. He played college basketball for the Toledo.

== Early life ==
Boothe grew up in Gurnee, Illinois and attended Warren Township High School. In his senior season, Boothe averaged 14.4 points, 7.5 rebounds, and 2.5 blocks per game. For most of his time in high school Boothe struggled with weight, reaching up to 285 pounds by his senior year, which drove away many potential offers from college coaches. He ultimately committed to play for the University of Toledo, who offered him their only available scholarship for the class of 2012.

== College career ==
Boothe was a four-year starter for the Toledo Rockets. Boothe was named to the Mid-American Conference (MAC) All-Freshman team after his first season. He averaged 10 points, 5.7 rebounds, and 2.2 assists per game in as a junior and was named honorable mention All-MAC. As a senior, Boothe led the MAC with 19.3 points per game, finished third in the league with 9.0 rebounds per game, and averaged 3.3 assists and was named first team All-MAC. Along with LSU's Ben Simmons, Boothe was one of two players in Division I to average at least 19 points, nine rebounds, and three assists during the 2015–16 season. He finished his collegiate career as Toledo's all-time leader in blocked shots with 155, tied for 10th (now 11th) with 1,494 points, and tied for 10th with 777 rebounds.

== Professional career ==
After going unselected in the 2016 NBA draft, Boothe played on Miami Heat's NBA Summer League team but ultimately was not invited to preseason training camp.

=== Pistoia ===
Boothe signed with The Flexx Pistoia of the Italian Lega Basket Serie A (LBA) on June 27, 2016. In his first professional season, Boothe averaged 11 points, 4.5 rebounds and 1.4 assists in 32 games. Following the season he played in the 2017 NBA Summer League as a member of the Brooklyn Nets team. He averaged 6.6 points and two rebounds over five games and was not offered a spot on the Nets preseason roster.

=== Sakarya ===
Boothe signed with Sakarya Büyükşehir Belediyesi S.K. of the Turkish Basketball Super League (BSL) on July 11, 2017. He averaged 9.5 points, 4.9 rebounds and 1.4 assists in 31 BSL games.

=== Oldenburg ===
Boothe signed with EWE Baskets Oldenburg of the German Basketball Bundesliga (BBL) on June 6, 2018. Boothe appeared in all 34 of EWE Baskets' regular season games off the bench, averaging 12.2 points, 4.6 rebounds, 1.0 assists, and 1.2 blocks per game (2nd-highest in the BBL) as the team finished second in the league.

=== Darüşşafaka ===
Boothe signed with Darüşşafaka of the Turkish Basketball Super League on July 18, 2021. Darüşşafaka also plays in the Basketball Champions League.

== Personal life ==
Boothe's father, Mark Boothe, played baseball at Northern Illinois University and is the school's all-time and single season leader in batting average. His brother David played offensive line for the football team at Hope College and his sister, Sarah, was named Ms. Basketball for Illinois and played collegiately at Stanford and now plays professionally in Australia.
