= Nick Weiler-Babb =

American-German basketball player

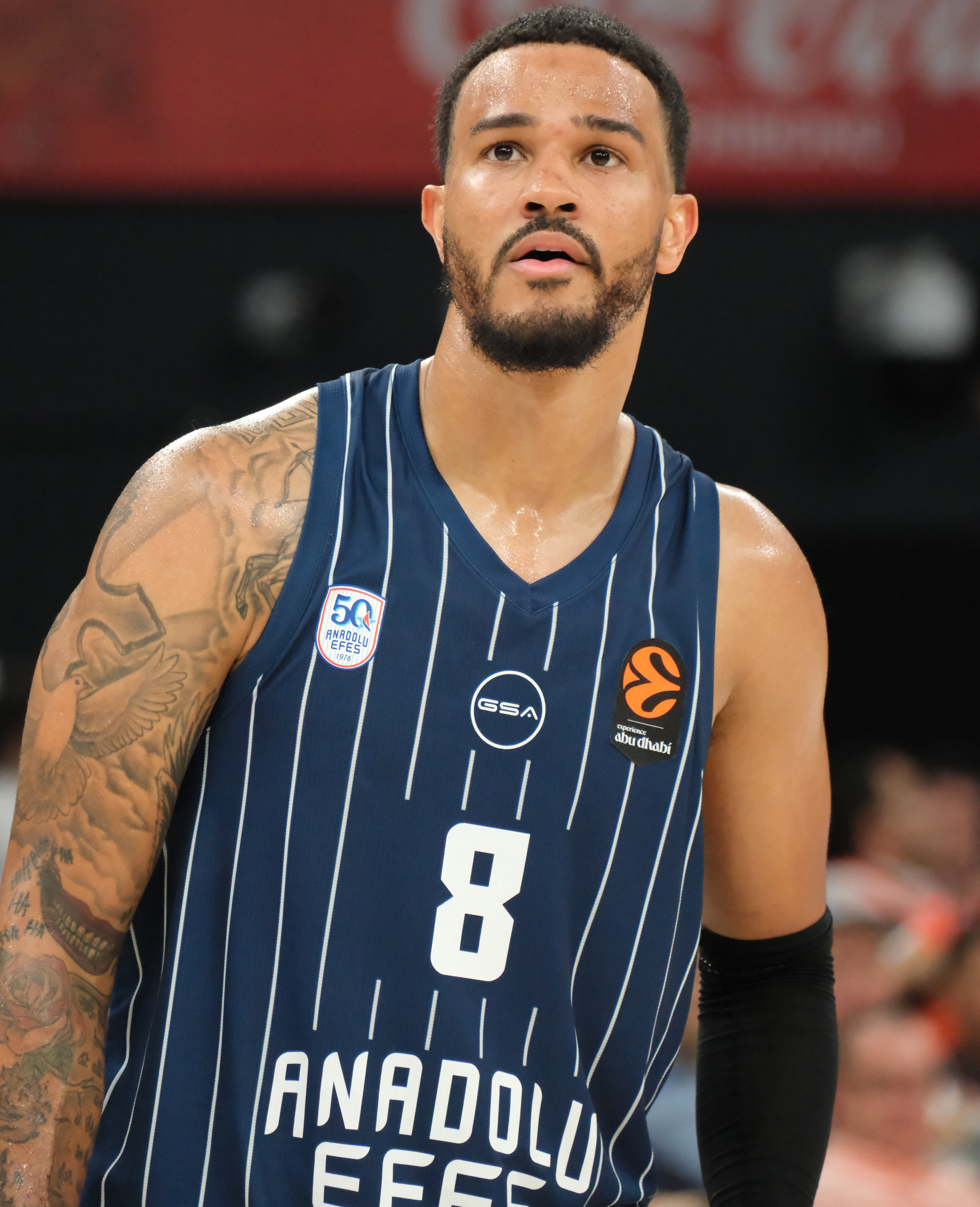
- Weiler-Babb with Anadolu Efes in 2025

No. 3 – Crvena zvezda Meridianbet
- Position: Point guard / shooting guard
- League: KLS; ABA League; EuroLeague

Personal information
- Born: December 12, 1995 (age 30) Topeka, Kansas, U.S.
- Listed height: 1.96 m (6 ft 5 in)
- Listed weight: 93 kg (205 lb)

Career information
- High school: Martin (Arlington, Texas)
- College: Arkansas (2014–2015); Iowa State (2016–2019)
- NBA draft: 2019: undrafted
- Playing career: 2019–present

Career history
- 2019–2020: Riesen Ludwigsburg
- 2020–2025: Bayern Munich
- 2025–2026: Anadolu Efes
- 2026–present: ASVEL
- 2026–present: →Crvena zvezda

Career highlights
- EuroLeague Best Defender (2025); EuroLeague steals leader (2025); 2× German Bundesliga champion (2024, 2025); German Cup winner (2023, 2024); German Cup MVP (2023); German Bundesliga Best Defender (2025)
Medals
Men's basketball
Representing Germany
EuroBasket
Bronze medal – third place	2022 Czech Republic–Georgia–Italy–Germany

Nicholas Alan Weiler-Babb (born December 12, 1995) is an American-German professional basketball player for Crvena zvezda of the Basketball League of Serbia (KLS), the ABA League, and the EuroLeague, on loan from ASVEL. He played college basketball for Iowa State.

== Early life ==
Weiler-Babb, born in Topeka, Kansas and moved to Texas when he was young. He is the son of Mike Babb, who owns Babb Brothers BBQ and Blues in Dallas, Texas. He is the younger brother of professional basketball player Chris Babb. Weiler-Babb attended Martin High School in Arlington, Texas. As a senior, he averaged 16 points, eight rebounds and eight assists per game. On August 11, 2013, Weiler-Babb committed to Arkansas over offers from SMU and Texas A&M.

== College career ==
As a freshman, Weiler-Babb averaged 0.7 points and 0.8 rebounds per game in 4.7 minutes per game for the Razorbacks. Following the season, he decided to transfer to Iowa State and sat out the 2015–16 season as a redshirt. Weiler-Babb averaged 4.0 points and 3.1 rebounds per game as a redshirt sophomore. On November 16, 2017, Weiler-Babb recorded a career-high 23 points, seven rebounds and seven assists in a 104–98 win against Appalachian State. He was named MVP of the Puerto Rico Tipoff as well as Big 12 player of the week. As a junior, Weiler-Babb averaged 11.3 points, 7.0 rebounds and 6.8 assists per game, shooting 44.7% from the floor and 32.3% from three-point range. He missed the final six games of the season due to knee tendonitis and a back injury. Weiler-Babb averaged 9.1 points, 5 rebounds and 4 assists per game as a senior on a team that won the Big 12 Tournament. He was named All-Big 12 Honorable Mention.

== Professional career ==
=== Riesen Ludwigsburg (2019–2020) ===
After going undrafted in the 2019 NBA draft, Weiler-Babb played for the Miami Heat in the NBA Summer League. On July 27, 2019, Weiler-Babb signed with Riesen Ludwigsburg of the German Basketball Bundesliga. He posted a triple-double of 10 points, 11 rebounds and 12 assists in a 94–80 home win against Telekom Baskets Bonn on October 5.

=== Bayern Munich (2020–2025) ===
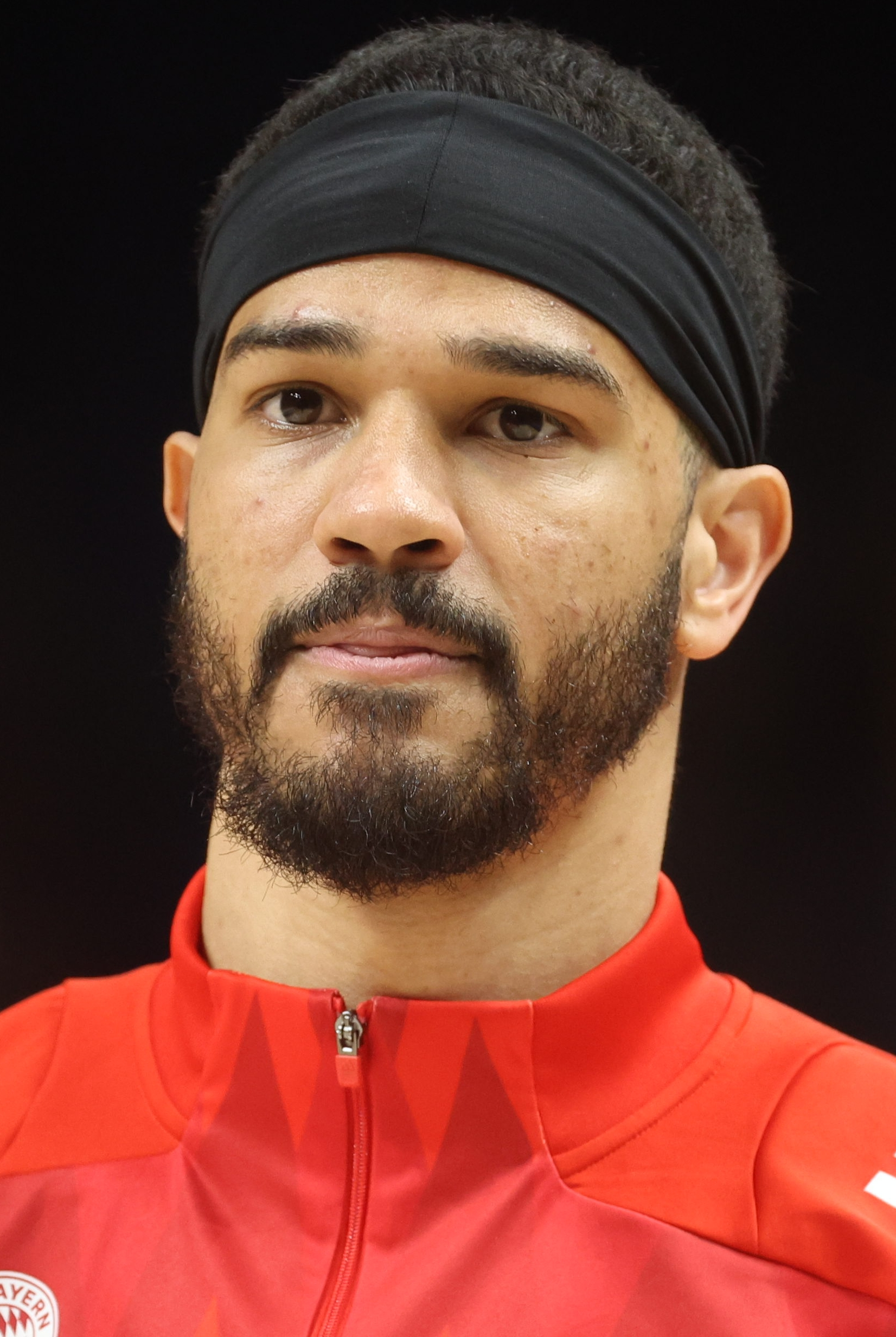
Weiler-Babb in 2025

On July 24, 2020, Weiler-Babb signed a two-year deal with Bayern Munich of the Basketball Bundesliga (BBL) and the EuroLeague. On July 8, 2022, he re-signed with the club until the end of the 2023–24 season. He won the 2023 BBL-Pokal with Bayern and was named the tournament's MVP. On July 10, 2024, Weiler-Babb renewed his contract with Bayern for an additional two seasons. On April 16, 2025, he was named the 2024–25 EuroLeague Best Defender, making history as the first player from Bayern to win this award.

=== Anadolu Efes (2025–2026) ===
On July 1, 2025, he signed with Anadolu Efes of the Turkish Basketbol Süper Ligi (BSL).

=== ASVEL (2026–present) ===
On July 1, 2026, Weiler-Babb signed a two-year contract with ASVEL of the French LNB Élite and the EuroLeague.

==== Loan to Crvena zvezda (2026–present) ====
On August 9, 2026, Weiler-Babb was loaned to Crvena zvezda Meridianbet of the Basketball League of Serbia (KLS), the ABA League, and the EuroLeague.

== National team career ==
Born in the United States, Weiler-Babb is of German descent through his mother. After obtaining German citizenship in the summer of 2022, he got called up to the German national basketball team by head coach Gordon Herbert. He represented Germany at the EuroBasket 2022, helping the team to a historic third-place finish.

== Career statistics ==
Legend
GP	Games played	GS	Games started	MPG	Minutes per game
FG%	Field-goal percentage	3P%	3-point field-goal percentage	FT%	Free-throw percentage
RPG	Rebounds per game	APG	Assists per game	SPG	Steals per game
BPG	Blocks per game	PPG	Points per game	PIR	Performance index rating
**Bold**	Career high

=== EuroLeague ===
Year	Team	GP	GS	MPG	FG%	3P%	FT%	RPG	APG	SPG	BPG	PPG	PIR
2020–21	Bayern Munich	33	13	23.6	.348	.340	.807	3.2	2.2	1.2	.2	6.3	7.1
2021–22	Bayern Munich	29	16	26.2	.427	.292	**.875**	**4.2**	2.9	1.1	.2	6.2	9.2
2022–23	Bayern Munich	31	25	25.5	.368	.331	.781	3.5	2.0	.6	**.3**	7.7	7.5
2023–24	Bayern Munich	34	4	21.8	.438	.387	.850	3.2	2.1	.7	.1	6.2	7.4
2024–25	Bayern Munich	34	34	26.3	**.478**	**.435**	.727	4.1	**4.9**	**1.5**	.1	**8.2**	**12.9**
2025–26	Anadolu Efes	**37**	**36**	**28.8**	.409	.366	.754	3.4	4.8	1.2	.1	7.7	11.0
Career		198	128	25.4	.410	.366	.791	3.6	3.2	1.1	.2	7.1	9.2

=== Domestic leagues ===
Year	Team	League	GP	MPG	FG%	3P%	FT%	RPG	APG	SPG	BPG	PPG
2019–20	(Germany) Riesen Ludwigsburg	BBL	30	30.5	.399	.326	.827	5.0	2.6	1.3	.2	13.3
2020–21	(Germany) Bayern Munich	BBL	22	28.0	.467	.421	.689	4.2	3.2	.9	.6	11.1
2021–22	(Germany) Bayern Munich	BBL	39	23.9	.490	.383	.844	3.9	2.9	1.2	.1	8.6
2022–23	(Germany) Bayern Munich	BBL	34	22.8	.430	.420	.750	3.4	2.4	1.1	.0	7.9
2023–24	(Germany) Bayern Munich	BBL	33	19.5	.407	.417	.818	3.1	2.1	.8	.1	5.8

=== College ===
Year	Team	GP	GS	MPG	FG%	3P%	FT%	RPG	APG	SPG	BPG	PPG
2014–15	Arkansas	26	0	4.8	.318	.333	**1.000**	.8	.5	.2	.1	0.7
2015–16	Iowa State	Redshirt										
2016–17	Iowa State	**35**	0	16.5	**.451**	.308	.707	3.1	1.6	.8	.1	4.0
2017–18	Iowa State	22	20	**36.0**	.447	.323	.759	**7.0**	**6.8**	**1.3**	**.4**	**11.3**
2018–19	Iowa State	**35**	**35**	34.4	.402	**.356**	.768	5.0	4.0	**1.3**	.3	9.1
Career		118	55	22.8	.422	.340	.755	3.9	3.0	.9	.2	6.1
