= Luke Sikma =

American basketball player (born 1989)

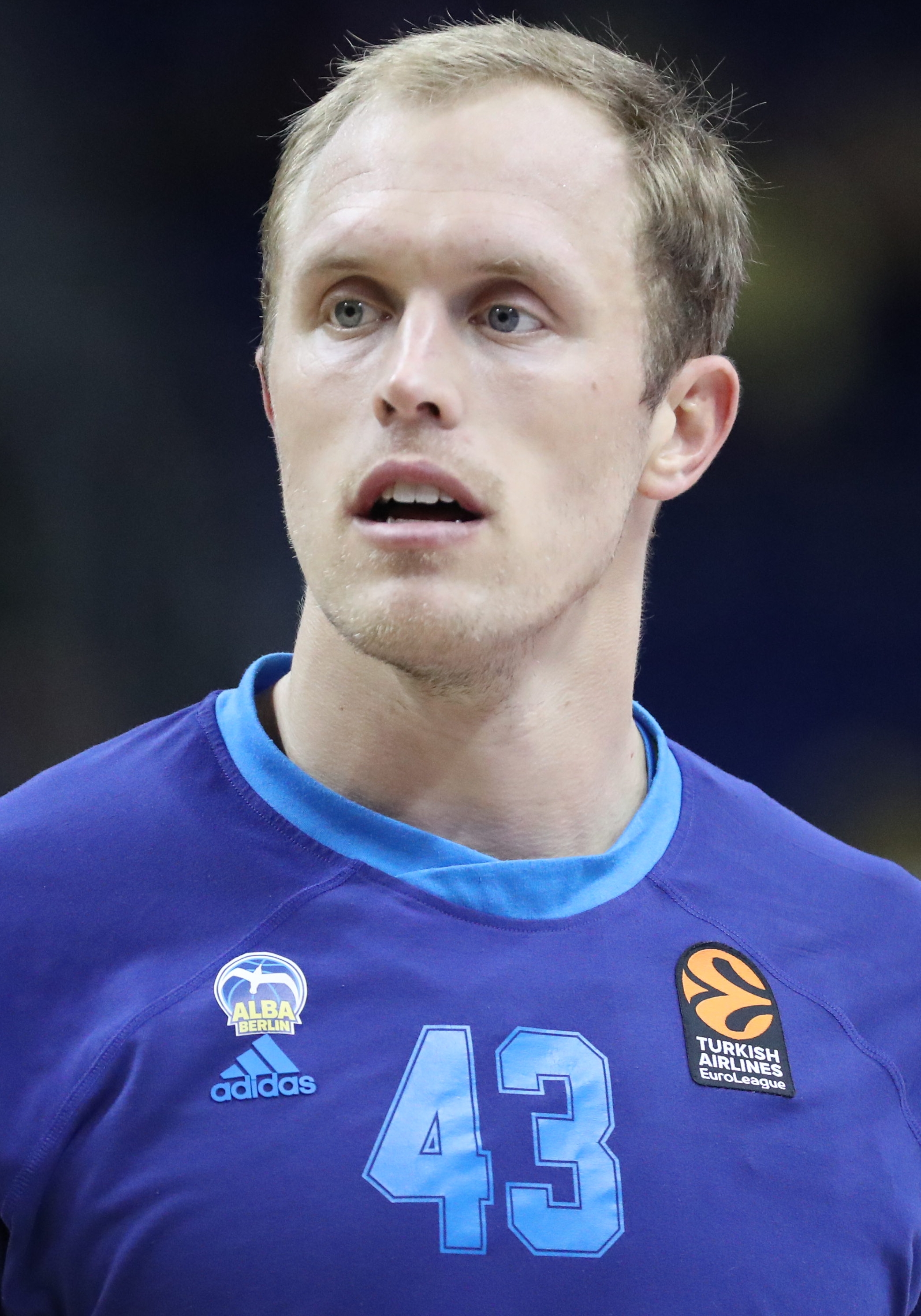
- Sikma with ALBA Berlin, in 2022

Free agent
- Position: Power forward

Personal information
- Born: July 30, 1989 (age 37) Bellevue, Washington, U.S.
- Listed height: 6 ft 7.5 in (2.02 m)
- Listed weight: 235 lb (107 kg)

Career information
- High school: Bellevue (Bellevue, Washington)
- College: Portland (2007–2011)
- NBA draft: 2011: undrafted
- Playing career: 2011–present

Career history
- 2011–2012: La Palma
- 2012–2013: Ford Burgos
- 2013–2015: Tenerife
- 2015–2017: Valencia
- 2017–2023: Alba Berlin
- 2023–2024: Olympiacos

Career highlights
- EuroCup MVP (2019); All-EuroCup First Team (2019); Greek Cup winner (2024); Greek Super Cup winner (2023); 3× Bundesliga champion (2020–2022); 2× German Cup winner (2020, 2022); Bundesliga MVP (2018); 3× All-Bundesliga First Team (2018–2020); All-Bundesliga Second Team (2022); German All-Star (2018); Liga ACB champion (2017); Liga ACB steals leader (2015); First-team All-WCC (2011)
- Stats at Basketball Reference

Lucas Clayton Sikma (born July 30, 1989) is an American professional basketball player who last played for Olympiacos of the Greek Basket League (GBL) and the Euroleague. He is the son of former National Basketball Association (NBA) player Jack Sikma.

== High school career ==
Sikma, a 6'8" power forward, played high school basketball for Bellevue High School in Bellevue, Washington. He was a late bloomer, growing 7 inches over two years and only making the varsity team as a junior and senior. As a result, he was not highly recruited. Ultimately he chose to sign with the University of Portland.

== College career ==
Despite his modest reputation coming into the Portland Pilots program in 2007, Sikma was able to make an immediate impact, starting 23 of the team's 31 games and averaging 6.1 points and 7.3 rebounds per game. After steady production as a sophomore and junior, Sikma stepped up his game significantly as a senior. He averaged a double-double at 12.9 points and West Coast Conference-leading 10.5 rebounds per game. He was named to the All-WCC first team. In his college career, Sikma scored 1,048 points (8.3 per game) and graduated as the Pilots' all-time leading rebounder with 987 (7.8 per game).

== Professional career ==
Sikma was not selected in the 2011 NBA draft. He signed with UB La Palma of Spain's second division (LEB Oro) for the 2011–12 season. He averaged 11.8 points and 7.7 rebounds before moving to Autocid Ford Burgos the following season. For the 2013–14 season Sikma moved up to the Spanish first division (Liga ACB), signing with CB Canarias.

After spending two years in Canarias with notable performances, Sikma signed for two years with Valencia Basket. In 2017, Sikma won the Liga ACB with Valencia after beating Real Madrid 3–1 in the league finals.

On July 5, 2017, Sikma signed with German club Alba Berlin of the Basketball Bundesliga (BBL). On April 28, 2018, Sikma was named the BBL Most Valuable Player and to the All-BBL First Team. On June 12, 2019, Alba Berlin announced a four-year extension of Sikma's contract.

On July 13, 2023, Sikma signed a two-year (1+1) deal with Olympiacos of the Greek Basket League and the EuroLeague. On July 3, 2024, he parted ways with the Greek club.

== Career statistics ==
Legend
GP	Games played	GS	Games started	MPG	Minutes per game
FG%	Field-goal percentage	3P%	3-point field-goal percentage	FT%	Free-throw percentage
RPG	Rebounds per game	APG	Assists per game	SPG	Steals per game
BPG	Blocks per game	PPG	Points per game	PIR	Performance index rating
**Bold**	Career high

=== EuroLeague ===
*	Led the league

Year	Team	GP	GS	MPG	FG%	3P%	FT%	RPG	APG	SPG	BPG	PPG	PIR
2019–20	Alba Berlin	28*	27	**25.8**	.490	**.433**	.700	**6.5**	4.5	1.1	**.5**	**9.7**	**16.6**
2020–21	Alba Berlin	31	**30**	24.9	**.536**	.333	.779	5.7	3.8	.8	.3	9.1	14.0
2021–22	Alba Berlin	29	25	23.8	.468	.357	**.818**	6.3	3.5	**1.2**	.2	9.0	14.1
2022–23	Alba Berlin	**33**	**30**	22.5	.478	.286	.677	5.3	**4.9**	1.0	.1	7.6	12.9
2023–24	Olympiacos	22	4	11.1	.489	.286	.550	2.7	.5	.4	.2	2.7	3.8
Career		143	116	22.2	.492	.356	.724	5.4	3.6	.9	.3	7.8	12.7

=== EuroCup ===
Year	Team	GP	GS	MPG	FG%	3P%	FT%	RPG	APG	SPG	BPG	PPG	PIR
2015–16	Valencia	16	15	21.2	.479	.222	.618	5.8	2.2	1.2	.3	5.8	9.8
2016–17	Valencia	22	18	19.9	.445	.303	.733	5.1	2.1	.7	.4	5.8	8.3
2017–18	Alba Berlin	16	15	26.8	**.604**	.375	.679	**6.6**	3.0	1.1	**.6**	**13.3**	**17.8**
2018–19	Alba Berlin	**24**	**24**	**28.3**	.482	**.389**	**.769**	**6.6**	**4.2**	**1.5**	.5	11.3	16.5
Career		78	72	23.8	.505	.347	.695	6.0	2.9	1.1	.4	9.0	13.1

=== Domestic leagues ===
Year	Team	League	GP	MPG	FG%	3P%	FT%	RPG	APG	SPG	BPG	PPG
2011–12	(Spain) La Palma	LEB Oro	38	26.6	.617	.000	.670	7.6	1.8	1.5	.4	12.0
2012–13	(Spain) Atapuerca	LEB Oro	25	24.8	.601	—	.732	8.1	1.3	1.9	.9	10.2
2013–14	(Spain) Canarias	ACB	34	26.4	.562	.182	.652	7.0	2.0	1.3	.8	9.9
2014–15	(Spain) Canarias	ACB	34	27.7	.526	.393	.579	6.6	2.3	1.9	.9	11.3
2015–16	(Spain) Valencia	ACB	32	22.7	.485	.545	.740	5.6	2.7	.9	.3	6.9
2016–17	(Spain) Valencia	ACB	43	19.9	.558	.321	.746	5.3	2.0	1.1	.3	7.2
2017–18	(Germany) Alba Berlin	BBL	47	26.7	.550	.429	.714	6.9	4.3	1.5	.3	12.5
2018–19	(Germany) Alba Berlin	BBL	42	24.8	.530	.384	.646	5.9	4.5	1.5	.5	10.9
2019–20	(Germany) Alba Berlin	BBL	28	23.2	.552	.491	.675	7.4	4.3	1.1	.2	9.6
2020–21	(Germany) Alba Berlin	BBL	34	21.9	.522	.328	.719	6.7	4.4	1.2	.3	9.4
2021–22	(Germany) Alba Berlin	BBL	36	21.3	.502	.425	.632	5.4	5.0	.8	.3	8.0
2022–23	(Germany) Alba Berlin	BBL	26	20.0	.593	.593	.681	4.6	4.2	.8	.2	8.7
2023–24	(Greece) Olympiacos	HEBA A1	5	20.5	.591	.000	.714	5.2	2.8	1.0	—	6.2

=== College ===
Year	Team	GP	GS	MPG	FG%	3P%	FT%	RPG	APG	SPG	BPG	PPG
2007–08	Portland	31	23	22.4	.532	.320	.620	7.3	2.1	.9	**.9**	6.1
2008–09	Portland	**32**	5	19.4	.513	.000	.596	5.7	1.5	.4	.6	6.1
2009–10	Portland	**32**	0	23.2	**.563**	.000	.750	7.5	1.8	1.2	.5	7.9
2010–11	Portland	**32**	**31**	**31.1**	.526	**.333**	**.789**	**10.5**	**2.6**	**1.3**	.8	**12.9**
Career		127	59	24.0	.533	.300	.714	7.8	2.0	1.0	.7	8.3
