= Jonas Wohlfarth-Bottermann =

German basketball player (born 1990)

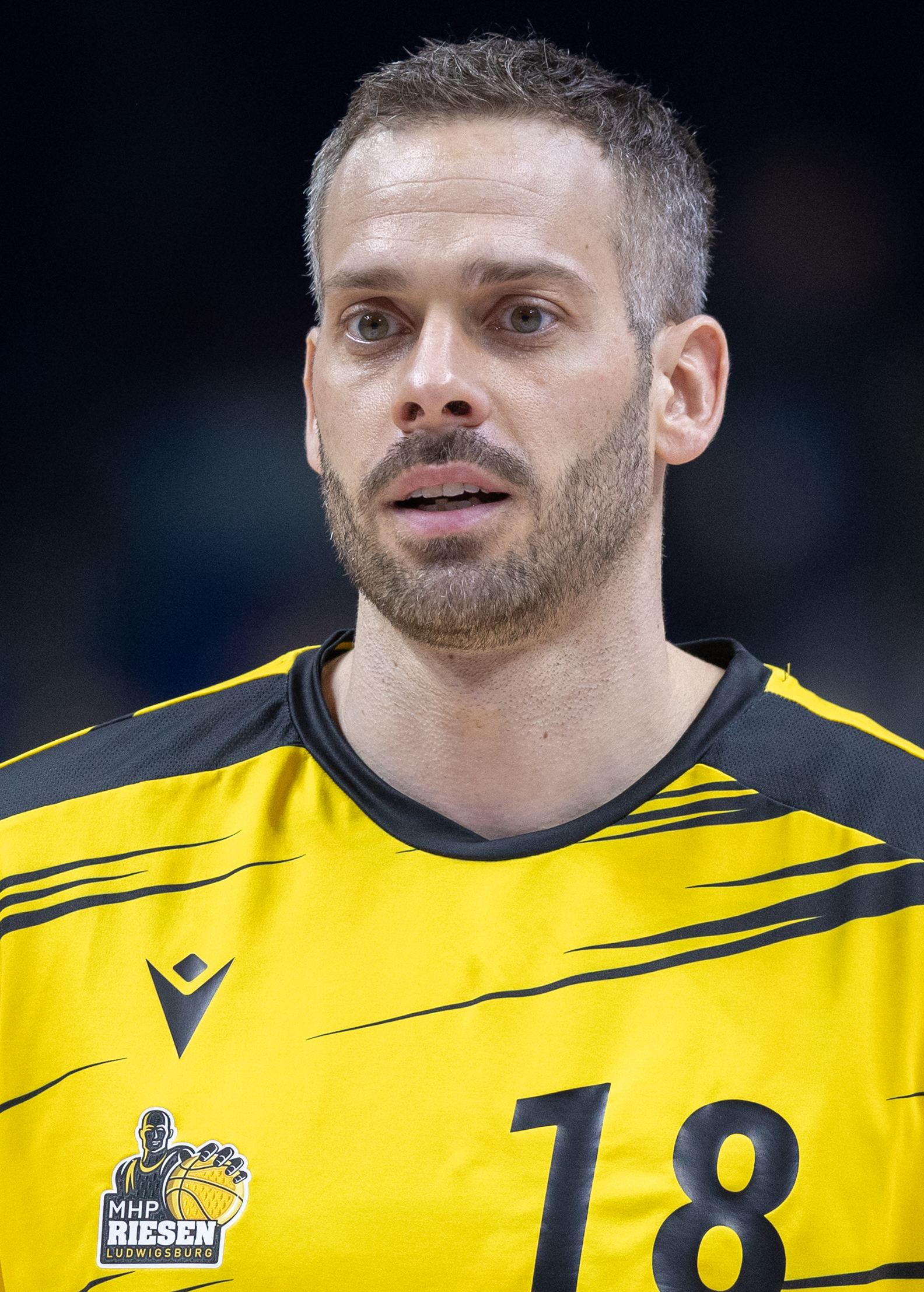
- Wohlfarth-Bottermann for Riesen Ludwigsburg in 2025

No. 18 – MHP Riesen Ludwigsburg
- Position: Center
- League: Basketball Bundesliga

Personal information
- Born: 20 February 1990 (age 36) Bonn, West Germany
- Listed height: 6 ft 10 in (2.08 m)
- Listed weight: 220 lb (100 kg)

Career information
- NBA draft: 2012: undrafted
- Playing career: 2008–present

Career history
- 2008–2013: Telekom Bonn
- 2009–2011: →Dragons Rhöndorf
- 2013–2016: Alba Berlin
- 2017–2019: Skyliners Frankfurt
- 2019–2022: Riesen Ludwigsburg
- 2022–2024: Hamburg Towers
- 2024–present: MHP Riesen Ludwigsburg

Career highlights
- 2× German Cup winner (2014, 2016); 2× German Supercup winner (2013, 2014); German Second League champion (2010); EuroChallenge blocks leader (2013)
Medals
Men's basketball
Representing Germany
EuroBasket
Bronze medal – third place	2022 Czech Republic–Georgia–Italy–Germany

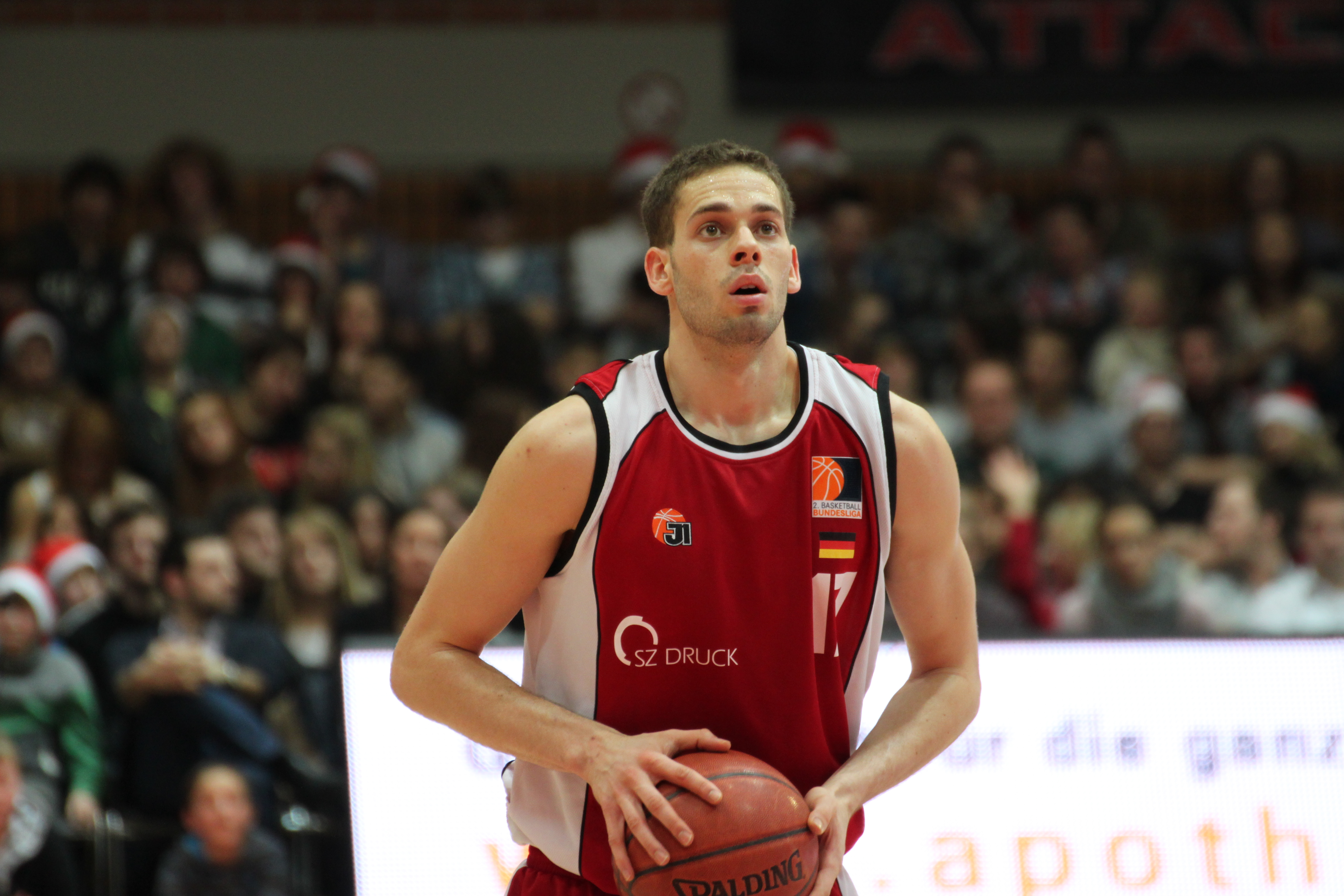
Wohlfarth-Bottermann with Rhöndorf in 2010

Jonas Wohlfarth-Bottermann (born 20 February 1990), known commonly as Wobo as is stated on his jersey, is a German professional basketball player for the MHP Riesen Ludwigsburg of the Basketball Bundesliga (BBL).

== Professional career ==
In June 2013, he signed a 3-year deal with the German powerhouse Alba Berlin.

On July 28, 2019, he signed a two-year contract with MHP Riesen Ludwigsburg.

On June 10, 2022, Wohlfarth-Bottermann signed with Hamburg Towers of German Basketball Bundesliga.

On June 18, 2024, he signed with MHP Riesen Ludwigsburg of the Basketball Bundesliga for a second stint after two years.

== Career statistics ==
Legend
GP	Games played	GS	Games started	MPG	Minutes per game
FG%	Field-goal percentage	3P%	3-point field-goal percentage	FT%	Free-throw percentage
RPG	Rebounds per game	APG	Assists per game	SPG	Steals per game
BPG	Blocks per game	PPG	Points per game	PIR	Performance index rating
**Bold**	Career high

=== EuroLeague ===
Year	Team	GP	GS	MPG	FG%	3P%	FT%	RPG	APG	SPG	BPG	PPG	PIR
2014–15	Alba Berlin	15	1	8.9	.488	.000	.261	1.9	.1	.3	.3	3.1	2.4
Career		15	1	8.9	.488	.000	.261	1.9	.1	.3	.3	3.1	2.4

== Honours ==
- BBL-Pokal (2013)
- 2x BBL Champions Cup (2013, 2014)
- ProA (2010)

Individual

- NBBL All-Star Game MVP (2009)
- EuroChallenge blocks leader (2013)
