= Scott Eatherton =

American basketball player

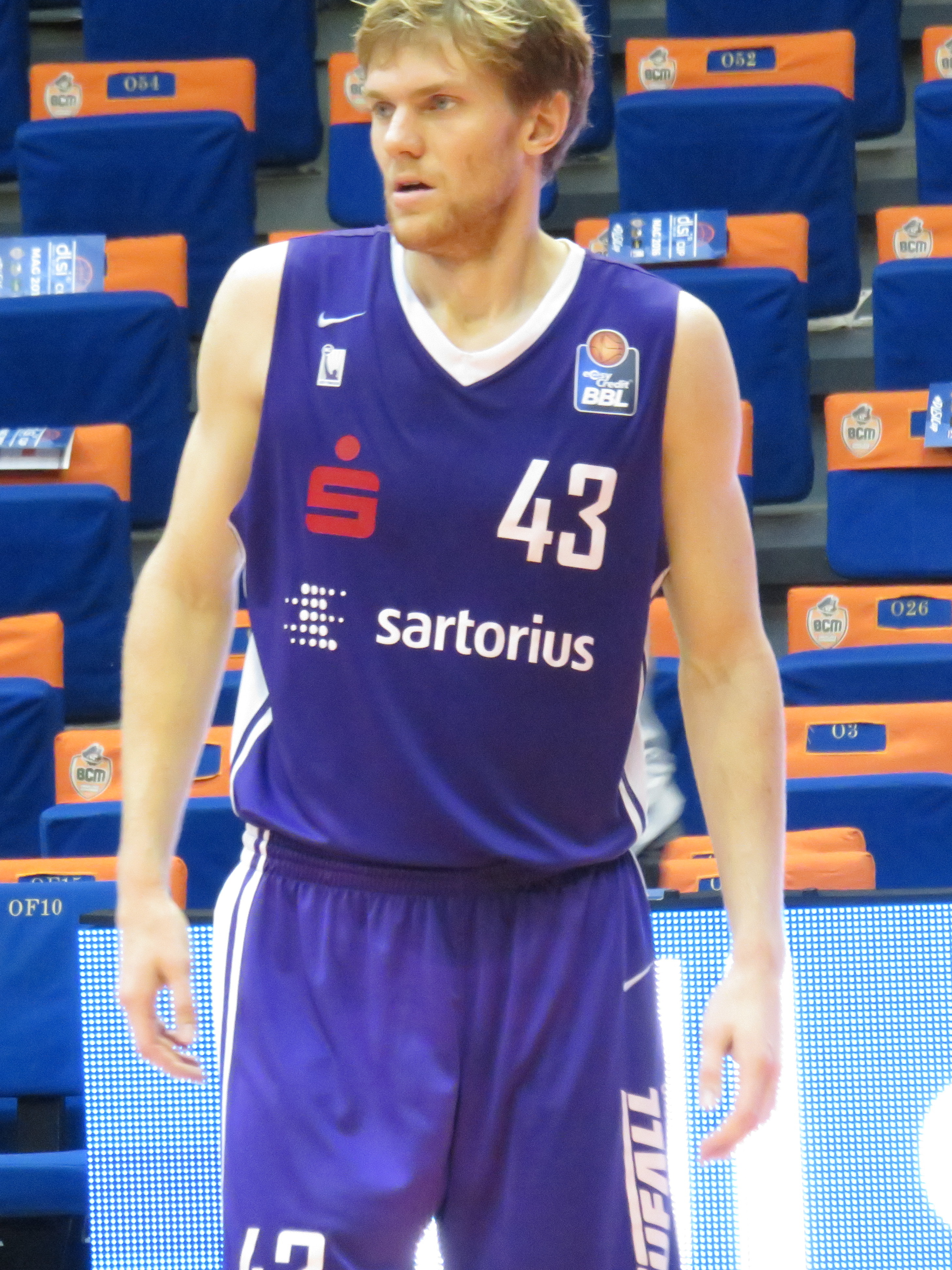

No. 43 – Nagoya Diamond Dolphins
- Position: Power forward / center
- League: B.League

Personal information
- Born: December 26, 1991 (age 34) Orlando, Florida, U.S.
- Listed height: 6 ft 10 in (2.08 m)
- Listed weight: 233 lb (106 kg)

Career information
- High school: Hershey (Hershey, Pennsylvania)
- College: Saint Francis (2010–2012); Northeastern (2013–2015)
- NBA draft: 2015: undrafted
- Playing career: 2015–present

Career history
- 2015–2016: Fortitudo Agrigento
- 2016–2017: BG Göttingen
- 2017–2020: Löwen Braunschweig
- 2020–2021: Manresa
- 2021–present: Nagoya Diamond Dolphins

Career highlights
- All-Bundesliga Second Team (2020); B.League FG% Leader (2025); First-team All-CAA (2015); CAA All-Defensive Team (2015)

Scott Eatherton (born December 26, 1991) is an American professional basketball player for the Nagoya Diamond Dolphins of the Japanese B.League. He played college basketball for the Saint Francis Red Flash and the Northeastern Huskies.

Eatherton was born in Orlando, Florida and raised in Hershey, Pennsylvania. After a prep career at Hershey High School, he signed with Saint Francis University of Loretto, Pennsylvania. After two seasons he transferred to Northeastern University in Boston, where as a senior he was named to the Colonial Athletic Association (CAA) all-defensive team and first-team all-conference.

Undrafted out of college, Eatherton signed with Fortitudo Agrigento in Italy for the 2015–16 season. He then moved to Germany, first for BG Göttingen for a season, and then to Löwen Braunschweig, where he would play three seasons. In his final season, he averaged 17.7 points and 8.2 rebounds per game. For the 2020–21 season, Eatherton moved to Baxi Manresa of Spain's Liga ACB.

== Career statistics ==
Legend
GP	Games played	MPG	Minutes per game	FG%	Field goal percentage
3P%	3-point field goal percentage	FT%	Free throw percentage	RPG	Rebounds per game
APG	Assists per game	SPG	Steals per game	BPG	Blocks per game
PPG	Points per game	**Bold**	Career high		Led the league

=== Liga Endesa ===
==== Regular season ====
Year	Team	GP	GS	MPG	FG%	3P%	FT%	RPG	APG	SPG	BPG	PPG
2020–21	Manresa	36	25	22.9	.592	.434	.752	5.6	1.4	.6	.3	13.9

=== B.League ===
==== Regular season ====
Year	Team	GP	GS	MPG	FG%	3P%	FT%	RPG	APG	SPG	BPG	PPG
2021–22	Nagoya	22	22	28.5	.635	.303	.725	8.7	2.6	.9	.5	18.6

Source: basketball-stats.de (Date: 28. January 2022)
