= Danilo Barthel =

German basketball player (born 1991)

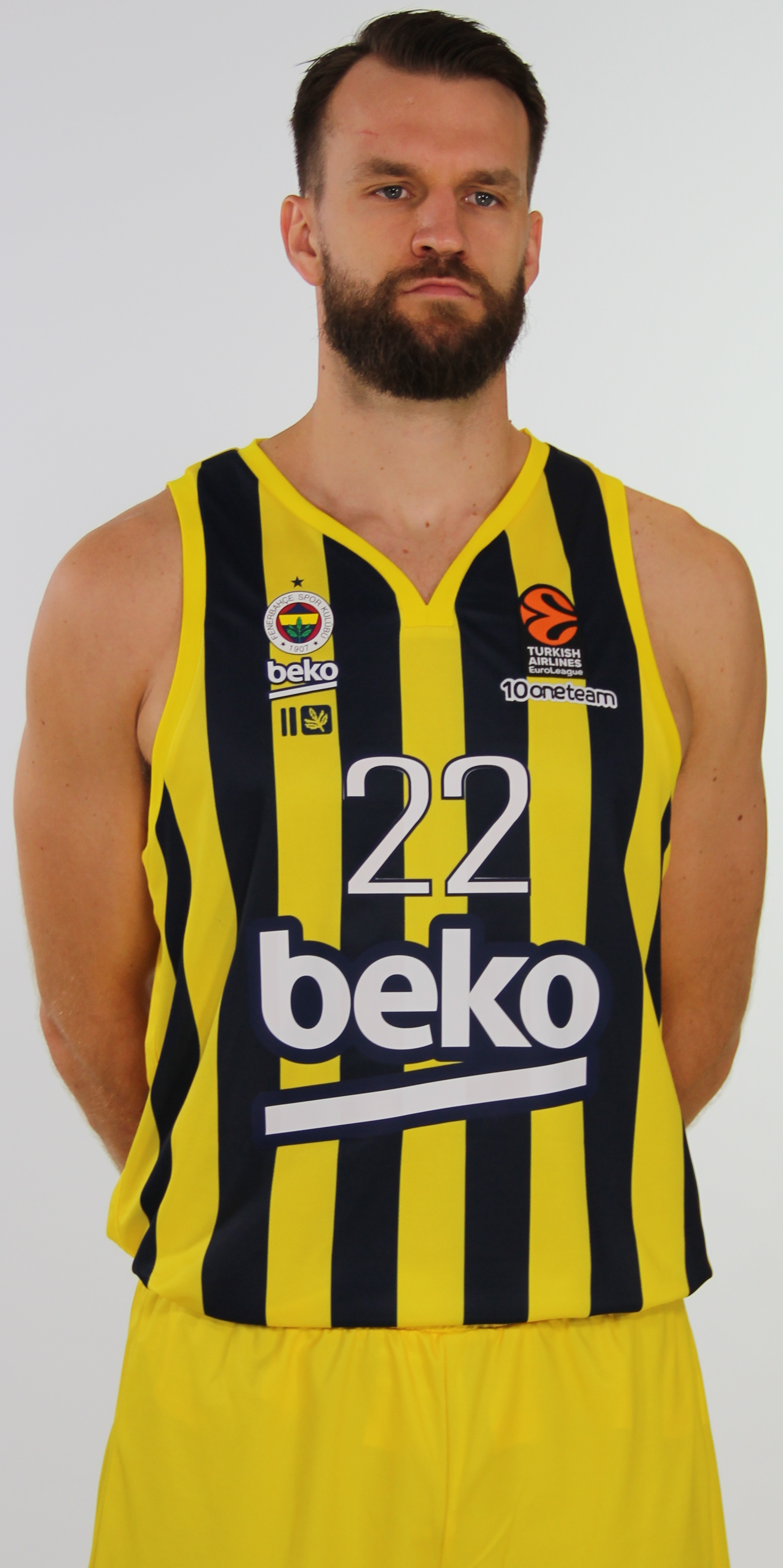
- Barthel with Fenerbahçe in 2021

Personal information
- Born: 24 October 1991 (age 33); Heidelberg, Germany
- Listed height: 6 ft 10 in (2.08 m)
- Listed weight: 220 lb (100 kg)

Career information
- NBA draft: 2013: undrafted
- Playing career: 2008–2022
- Position: Power forward / center
- Number: 22, 21

Career history
- 2008–2011: USC Heidelberg
- 2011–2016: Fraport Skyliners
- 2016–2020: Bayern Munich
- 2020–2022: Fenerbahçe

Career highlights and awards
- Turkish Super League champion (2022); FIBA Europe Cup champion (2016); Bundesliga champion (2018); Bundesliga Finals MVP (2018); 4× German All-Star (2015–2018); 2× All-Bundesliga Second Team (2018, 2019); Bundesliga Most Improved Player (2014)

Danilo Timon Barthel (born 24 October 1991) is a German former professional basketball player.

== Professional career ==
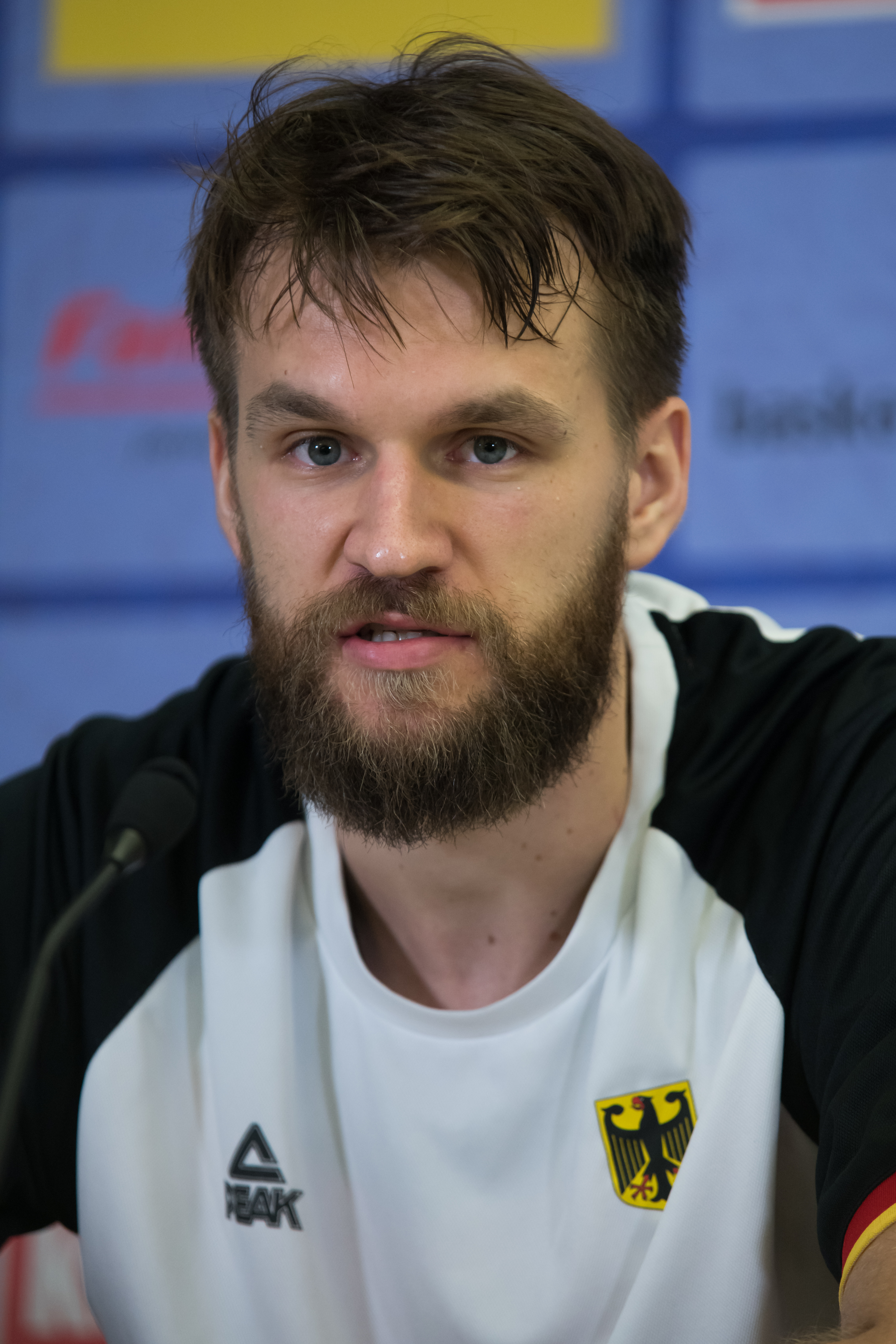
Barthel with Germany in 2017

Barthel began his professional career in his hometown with USC Heidelberg in 2008. On 23 June 2011 he signed with Fraport Skyliners.

In the 2013–14 season he played 34 league games for Frankfurt, averaging 11.3 points, 4.9 rebounds and 1.4 assists in 28.1 minutes per game. For the season, he was named the League's BBL Most Improved Player.

With Frankfurt he won the 2015–16 FIBA Europe Cup in a final against Openjobmetis Varese.

On 6 July 2016 he signed a two-year deal with Bayern Munich. On 17 June 2018 Barthel won his first BBL championship with Bayern after defeating Alba Berlin 3–2 in the finals. Barthel was named the Finals MVP after the decisive game five. Over five finals games, he averaged 12.8 points, 4.6 rebounds on 70.8% shooting from the field.

On 13 July 2020 Barthel signed his first contract outside of Germany, accepting an offer from top Turkish side Fenerbahçe Istanbul. On 20 June 2022 Barthel parted ways with the Turkish club.

On 20 August 2023, Barthel announced his retirement due to a persistent knee injury.

== International career ==
Barthel has been a member of the German national under-18 and German national under-20 teams. He played in the 2009 FIBA Europe Under-18 Championship and the 2010 and 2011 FIBA Europe Under-20 Championship and helped the German team to fifth place in 2011, averaging 4.9 points, 4.1 rebounds and 0.9 assists.

On 27 July 2014, he made his debut for the senior Germany national basketball team in a game against Finland. Barthel played with Germany at the 2020 Summer Olympics in Tokyo.
