= Eurocup Basketball 2012–13 Last 16 Group L =

Standings and Results for Group L of the Last 16 phase of the 2012–13 Eurocup basketball tournament.

== Standings ==
Key to colors
Top two places in each group advance to the Quarterfinals

	Team	Pld	W	L	PF	PA	Diff	Tie-break
1.	(Russia) BC UNICS Kazan	6	4	2	461	443	+18	
2.	(Germany) Ratiopharm Ulm	6	3	3	516	496	+20	1–1 (+5)
3.	(Turkey) Galatasaray Medical Park	6	3	3	459	459	0	1–1 (–5)
4.	(Serbia) Crvena Zvezda Telekom	6	2	4	476	514	–38	

== Fixtures and results ==
All times given below are in Central European Time.

=== Game 1 ===
9 January 2013
19:15

Report

Galatasaray Medical Park (Turkey)	74–80	(Russia) BC UNICS Kazan
Scoring by quarter: 20–16, 16–19, 19–19, 19–26
Pts: Hawkins 20; Rebs: Dudley 6 Asts: Arroyo 5		Pts: Eidson 23; Rebs: Vougioukas, Chatman 7 Asts: Chatman 6

Abdi İpekçi Arena, Istanbul
Attendance: 7,480
Referees: Milivoje Jovcic (SRB), Haris Bijedic (BIH), Carlos Cortes (ESP)

9 January 2013
19:30

Report

Ratiopharm Ulm (Germany)	95–100	(Serbia) Crvena zvezda
Scoring by quarter: 22–23, 17–25, 19–21, 37–31
Pts: Bryant 20; Rebs: Bryant 12; Asts: Günther 4		Pts: Rakočević 32; Rebs: Brown 10; Asts: Radivojević 7

Arena Ulm/Neu-Ulm, Neu-Ulm
Attendance: 6,000
Referees: Jose Ramon Garcia Ortiz (ESP), Oscar Perea (ESP), Ersan Kartal (TUR)

=== Game 2 ===
16 January 2013
16:00

Report

BC UNICS Kazan (Russia)	87–95	(Germany) Ratiopharm Ulm
Scoring by quarter: 21–24, 25–22, 13–17, 28–32
Pts: Eidson 31; Rebs: Eidson 10; Asts: Kaimakoglou 5		Pts: Ray 20; Rebs: Bryant 13; Asts: Günther 6

Basket-Hall Arena, Kazan
Attendance: 2,700
Referees: Dubravko Muhvic (CRO), Jurgis Laurinavicius (LTU), Saso Petek (SLO)

16 January 2013
19:30

Report

Crvena zvezda (Serbia)	74–91	(Turkey) Galatasaray Medical Park
Scoring by quarter: 18–22, 24–27, 18–22, 14–20
Pts: Rakočević 16; Rebs: Savović 9 Asts: Radivojević, Rakočević 3		Pts: Gordon 22; Rebs: N'Dong 7 Asts: Hawkins 5

Pionir Hall, Belgrade
Attendance: 8,000
Referees: Jose Martin (ESP), Gianluca Mattioli (ITA), Marius Ciulin (ROM)

=== Game 3 ===
22 January 2013
19:15

Report

Galatasaray Medical Park (Turkey)	82–66	(Germany) Ratiopharm Ulm
Scoring by quarter: 22–17, 22–20, 22–16, 16–13
Pts: Gordon 18; Rebs: Gordon, Aldemir 6 Asts: Arroyo 8		Pts: Bryant 18; Rebs: Bryant 7 Asts: Jeter 3

Abdi İpekçi Arena, Istanbul
Attendance: 5,540
Referees: Fernando Rocha (POR), Elias Koromilas (GRE), Omer Esteron (ISR)

23 January 2013
16:00

Report

BC UNICS Kazan (Russia)	78–59	(Serbia) Crvena zvezda
Scoring by quarter: 10–16, 26–19, 24–17, 18–7
Pts: Chatman 20; Rebs: Veremeenko 6 Asts: Eidson, Chatman 5		Pts: Brown 13; Rebs: Three players 5 Asts: Nelson 5

Basket-Hall Arena, Kazan
Attendance: 2,700
Referees: Guerrino Cerebuch (ITA), Seffi Shemmesh (ISR), Panagiotis Anastopoulos (GRE)

=== Game 4 ===
30 January 2013
19:30

Report

Ratiopharm Ulm (Germany)	91–70	(Turkey) Galatasaray Medical Park
Scoring by quarter: 25–17, 14–16, 17–20, 35–17
Pts: Bryant 20; Rebs: Bryant 17; Asts: Jeter 7		Pts: Arroyo 23; Rebs: Dudley 6 Asts: Arroyo 5

Arena Ulm/Neu-Ulm, Neu-Ulm
Attendance: 6,000
Referees: Marek Cmikiewicz (POL), Petar Obradović (BIH), Anastasios Piloidis (GRE)

30 January 2013
19:30

Report

Crvena zvezda (Serbia)	81–73	(Russia) BC UNICS Kazan
Scoring by quarter: 20–26, 21–17, 22–7, 18–23
Pts: Rakočević 21; Rebs: Savović 8 Asts: Rakočević, Nelson 3		Pts: Chatman 18; Rebs: Kaimakoglou, Vougioukas 6 Asts: Kaimakoglou 5

Pionir Hall, Belgrade
Attendance: 7,000
Referees: Tomas Jasevicius (LTU), Sergiy Chebyshev (UKR), Miroslav Tomov (BUL)

=== Game 5 ===
13 February 2013
16:00

Report

BC UNICS Kazan (Russia)	64–57	(Turkey) Galatasaray Medical Park
Scoring by quarter: 21–14, 11–14, 15–14, 17–15
Pts: Veremeenko 15; Rebs: Veremeenko 9 Asts: Chatman 8		Pts: Atsür 12; Rebs: N'Dong 14; Asts: Arroyo 5

Basket-Hall Arena, Kazan
Attendance: 4,000
Referees: Sinisa Herceg (CRO), Radomir Vojinovic (MNE), Carmelo Paternico (ITA)

13 February 2013
19:30

Report

Crvena zvezda (Serbia)	78–92	(Germany) Ratiopharm Ulm
Scoring by quarter: 19–22, 19–24, 18–21, 22–25
Pts: Rakočević 24; Rebs: Radivojević 7 Asts: Radivojević 4		Pts: Ray 26; Rebs: Esterkamp, Nankivil 6 Asts: Günther 6

Pionir Hall, Belgrade
Attendance: 7,000
Referees: Paolo Taurino (ITA), Luis Lopes (POR), Sergiy Zashchuk (UKR)

=== Game 6 ===
19 February 2013
20:00

Report

Galatasaray Medical Park (Turkey)	85–84	(Serbia) Crvena zvezda
Scoring by quarter: 27–20, 22–22, 16–25, 20–17
Pts: Markoishvili, Arslan 17; Rebs: Aldemir 11; Asts: Korkmaz 4		Pts: Savović 20; Rebs: Savović 13; Asts: Radivojević 8

Abdi İpekçi Arena, Istanbul
Attendance: 1,100
Referees: Christos Christodoulou (GRE), Marcin Kowalski (POL), Ioannis Foufis (GRE)

19 February 2013
20:00

Report

Ratiopharm Ulm (Germany)	77–79	(Russia) BC UNICS Kazan
Scoring by quarter: 22–19, 15–16, 19–14, 21–30
Pts: Jeter 18; Rebs: Bryant 9 Asts: Schwethelm, Günther 3		Pts: Eidson 24; Rebs: Vougioukas 9 Asts: Chatman, Vougioukas 2

Arena Ulm/Neu-Ulm, Neu-Ulm
Attendance: 6,000
Referees: Dubravko Muhvic (CRO), Apostolos Kalpakas (SWE), Aare Halliko (EST)
