= BBL All-Star Game =

German basketball competition

- First season: 1987–88
- Country: Germany
- Number of teams: 2
- Current champions: Team National (2018–19)
- Most championships: Team International

The BBL All-Star Game is the annual All-Star Game of the German first-division basketball league, the Basketball Bundesliga (BBL). The event is based on the original NBA concept and includes a slam dunk contest and a three-point shootout. Since 2012, the All-Star Game has been played between "Team National" (domestic players) and "Team International" (foreign players).

== Games ==
=== 2012–present: National – International ===
Date	City	Arena	Attendance	National - International		MVP
Since the Season 2020–21: No All-Star Game has been played.
March 23, 2019	Trier	Trier Arena	4,600	151	148	(Germany) İsmet Akpınar
January 13, 2018	Göttingen	Lokhalle Göttingen	3,300	132	145	(United States) Peyton Siva
January 14, 2017	Bonn	Telekom Dome	6,000	99	102	(Germany) Philipp Schwethelm
January 9, 2016	Bamberg	Brose Arena	6,000	128	118	(Germany) Per Günther
January 10, 2015	Neu-Ulm	ratiopharm Arena	6,000	101	110	(United States) Brad Wanamaker
January 18, 2014	Bonn	Telekom Dome	6,000	116	121	(United States) Isaiah Swann
January 19, 2013	Nürnberg	Arena Nürnberg	7,413	95	113	(United States) John Bryant (2)
January 21, 2012	Ludwigsburg	Arena Ludwigsburg	4,150	84	89	(United States) John Bryant

=== 1987–2011 ===
Date	City	Arena	Attendance	North – South		MVP
22.01.2011	Trier	Trier Arena	5.738	114	103	(United States) Kyle Hines
23.01.2010	Bonn	Telekom Dome	6.000	92	102	(United States) Chris Ensminger
17.01.2009	Mannheim	SAP-Arena	7.711	98	97	(United States) Darren Fenn
19.01.2008	Mannheim	SAP-Arena	9.404	104	88	(United States) Julius Jenkins
27.01.2007	Köln	Kölnarena	13.412	112	98	(United States) Demond Mallet
28.01.2006	Köln	Kölnarena	15.172	157 (3OT)	154	(United States) Brian Brown
15.01.2005	Köln	Kölnarena	12.115	103	110	(Germany) Denis Wucherer
31.01.2004	Köln	Kölnarena	16.132	114	105	(Lithuania) Rimantas Kaukėnas
04.01.2003	Köln	Kölnarena	17.105	112	105	(United States) Carl Brown
05.01.2002	Berlin	Max-Schmeling-Halle	8.500	112	102	(United States) Reggie Bassette
17.02.2001	Berlin	Max-Schmeling-Halle	8.500	112	109	(United States) John Best
19.12.1999	Bielefeld	Seidensticker Halle	6.000	141	131	(Nigeria) Olumide Oyedeji
Date	City	Arena	Attendance	National – International		MVP
03.10.1998	Köln	Kölnarena	6.104	126	132	?
1997/1998	Oberhausen	Arena Oberhausen	?	126	140	(United States) Wendell Alexis
1996/1997	Bonn	Hardtberghalle	?	163	165 (OT)	(Croatia) Siniša Kelečević
Date	City	Arena	Attendance	North – South		MVP
1995/1996	Karlsruhe	Europahalle	?	109	93	(Slovenia) Teoman Alibegovic
1994/1995	Karlsruhe	Europahalle	?	122	132	
1993/1994	Karlsruhe	Europahalle	?	96	93	
1992/1993	Karlsruhe	Europahalle	?	141	120	
1991/1992	Karlsruhe	Europahalle	?	154	147	
1990/1991	Karlsruhe	Europahalle	?	162	153	
1989/1990	Hagen	Ischelandhalle	?	150	145	
1988/1989	– (Note: The 1989 All-Star Game was canceled due to scheduling problems.)	–	–	–		
1987/1988	Ludwigsburg	Rundsporthalle Ludwigsburg	?	179	151	

=== Players with most MVP awards ===
Player	Wins	Editions
(United States) John Bryant	2	2012, 2013

== Score sheets (1998-2010) ==
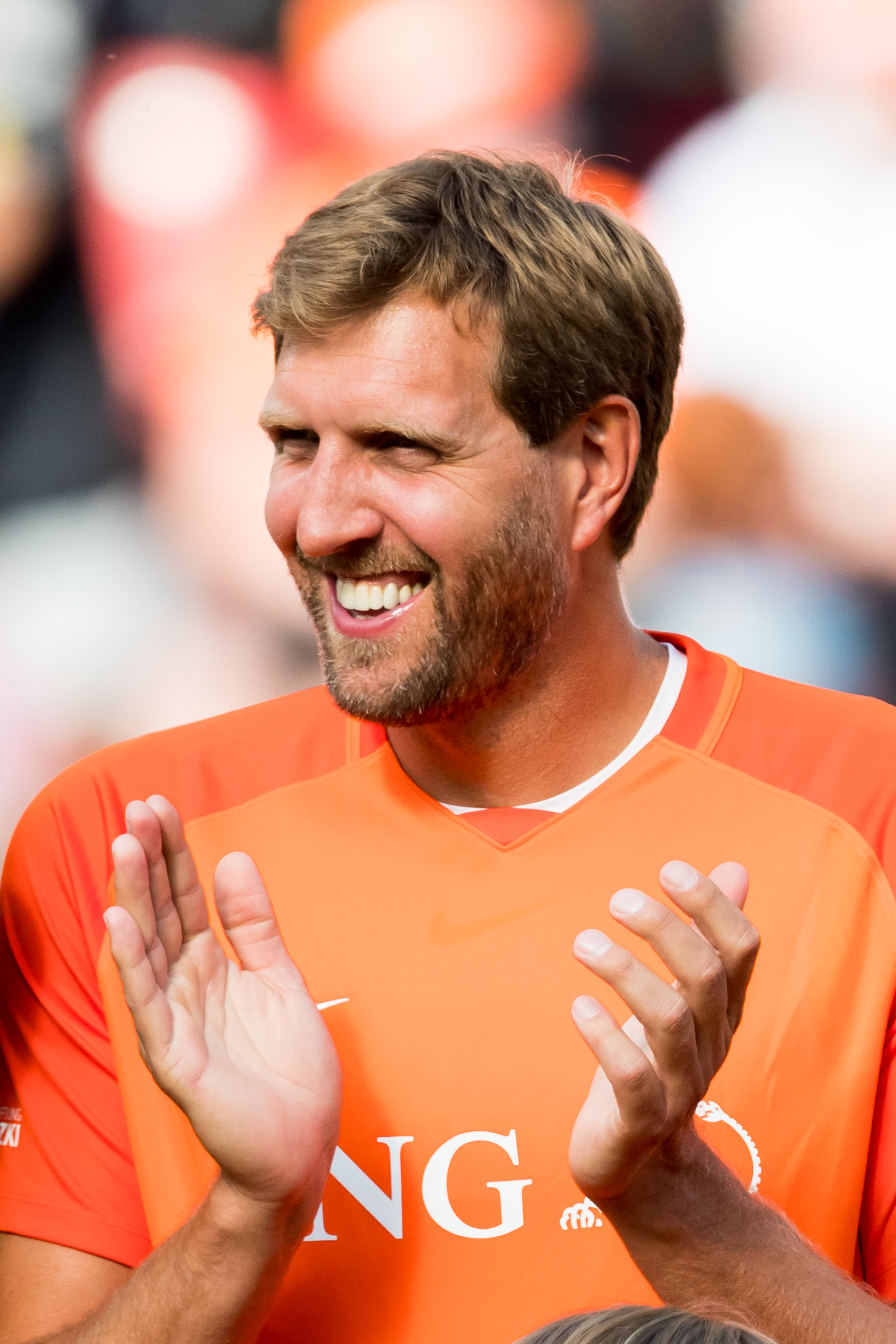
Dirk Nowitzki featured in the 1998 edition.

- 11th All-Star Game 1998-99:

DATE: 3 October 1998
VENUE: Kölnarena, Köln, att: 6.104
SCORE: National – International 126-132

National : Marco Pesic 12, Drazan Tomic 19, Malikk Ruddigkeit 7, Marc Suhr 20, Patrick King 4, Derrick Taylor 17, Stephan Baeck 7, Detletf Musch 7, Dirk Nowitzki 178, Tim Nees 6, Mark Flick 9. Coach: Don Beck (Trier).

International : Jarvis Walker 5, Carl Borwn 13, Olumide Oyedeji 13, Walter Bond 7, Thalamus McGhee 10, Sava Stefanovic 10, Wendell Alexis 12, Robert Boykins 10, Bernard Thompson 17, Steven Key 4. Coach: Joe Whelton (Rondorf)

- 13th All-Star Game 2000-01:

DATE: 17 February 2001
VENUE: Max-Schmeling-Halle, Berlin, att: 8.500
SCORE: North – South 112-109

North : Wendell Alexis, John Best 23, Dejan Koturovic 25, Marko Pesic 10, Derrick Phelps 14 (starters) ; Hansi Gnad 8, Henrik Rodl 4, Terrell McIntyre, Daren Queenan 11, Mithat Demirel, Marc Suhr 8, Pavel Becka, Mark Flick 8, Fernandes 1.

South : MC Mazique 15, Mark Miller 13, Robert Garrett 2, Tyron McCoy 12, Adonis Jordan 8 (starters) ; Sinisa Kelecevic 18, Hurl Beechum 12, Carl Brown 6, Gerrit Terdenge 8, Mike Mitchell 5, Jarvis Walker 6, Derrick Taylor 4.

- 14th All-Star Game 2001-02:

DATE: 15 January 2002
VENUE: Max-Schmeling-Halle, Berlin, att: 8.500
SCORE: North – South 112-102

North : John Best, Wendell Alexis, Reggie Bassette, Derrick Phelps, Marco Pesic, Sasa Obradovic, C.C. Harrison, Demond Mallet, Mike Doyle, Pavel Becka, Evaldas Jocys, Artur Kolodziejski. Coach: Svetislav Pesic (Rhein Energy Cologne)

South : Marcus Goree, Robert Garrett, Carl Brown, Hurl Beechum, Pascal Roller, Aleksandar Nadjfeji, Mike Mitchell, DeJuan Collins, Chris Ensminger, Chad Austin, Robert Maras, Demond Greene. Coach: Gordon Herbert (Opel Skyliners Frankfurt)

- 16th All-Star Game 2003-04:

DATE: 31 January 2004
VENUE: Kölnarena, Köln, att: 16.132
SCORE: North – South 114-105

North: Wendell Alexis, Carl Brown, Mithat Demirel (DNP), John Best, Jovo Stanojevic, Demond Mallet, Geert Hammink, Tyron Mc Coy, Michael Jordan, Terrel Castle, Denis Wucherer, Vladimir Petrović-Stergiou*. Coach: Don Beck (Baskets Oldenburg).

South : Steffen Hamann, Rimantas Kaukenas, Aleksandar Nadjfeji, Chris Ensminger, Pascal Roller, John Thomas, Narcisse Ewodo, BJ McKie, Jermaine Dearman, Ivo Kresta, Mario Kasun. Coach: Gordon Herbert (Opel Skyliners Frankfurt)

- Vladimir Petrović-Stergiou as replacement for injured Demirel.

- 17th All-Star Game 2004-05:

DATE: 15 January 2005
VENUE: Kölnarena, Köln, att: 12.115
SCORE: North – South 103-110

North: Immanuel McElroy 16, Altron Jackson 15, William Edwards 15, Michael Wright 11, Denis Wucherer 10, Mithat Demirel 10, Ryan Bond 9, Zeljko Zagorac 7, Michael Jordan 4, Demond Greene 4, Tyron McCoy 2.

South : Brian Brown 16, Chris Williams 14, Lamayn Wilson 12, Chuck Eidson 11, Demond Mallet 11, Narcisse Ewodo 10, Singaras Tribe 9, Brian Jones 9, Chris Ensminger 8, Pascal Roller 5, Hurl Beechum 3, Jerry Green 2

- 19th All-Star Game 2006-07:

DATE: 27 January 2007
VENUE: Kölnarena, Köln, att: 13.412
SCORE: North – South 112-98

North: Sharrod Ford 21, Judson Wallace 15, Demond Mallet 14, Jacobson 14, Immanuel McElroy 4 (starters); D'or Fischer 10, Tory Walker 8, Sergerio Gipson 8, Koko Archibong 8, Hall 7, Jared Newson 3, Jason Gardner 0

South : Stefano Garris 21, Darren Fenn 16, A.J. Moye 10, Je'Kel Foster 9, Tommy Adams 0 (starters) ; Jeff Gibbs 14, Robert Garrett 10, Domonic Jones 7, Robert Maras 4, Pavelas Cukinas 3, Demond Greene2, Ryan DeMichael 2

- 20th All-Star Game 2007-08:

DATE: 19 January 2008
VENUE: Mannheim, SAP-Arena, att: 9.404
SCORE: North – South 104-88

North: Bobby Brown, Julius Jenkins, Jan Rohdewald, Patrick Femerling, Tim Black, Jeb Ivey, Rickey Paulding, Zygimantas Jonusas, Andrew Drevo, Nate Fox, Adam Chubb. Coach: Luka Pavicevic (Alba Berlin)

South : Steffen Hamann, Demond Greene, Konrad Wysocki, Derrick Allen, Darren Fenn, Pascal Roller, Brandon Woudstra, Alexander Seggelke, Rouven Roessler, Jason Conley, Caleb Green, Rasko Katic. Coach: Dirk Bauermann (Bamberg)

- 21st All-Star Game 2008-09:

DATE: 17 January 2009
VENUE: Mannheim, SAP-Arena, att: 7.711
SCORE: North – South 98-97

North: Jason Gardner, Julius Jenkins, Rickey Paulding 14, Darren Fenn 13, Ansu Sesay (starters); Andrew Drevo 13, Brant Bailey 13, Kyle Bailey, Immanuel McElroy, Zygimantas Jonusas, Brant Bailey, Robert Turner, Chris Ensminger

South : Pascal Roller, Brandon Woudstra, Konrad Wysocki, Jeff Gibbs 11, Tim Ohlbrecht 18 (starters); Winsome Frazier 17, Brandon Bowman 17, Heiko Schaffartzik , Derek Raivio, Winsome Frazier, Predrag Suput, Richard Chaney, Omari Westley, Ken Johnson

- 22nd All-Star Game 2009-10:

DATE: 23 January 2010
VENUE: Bonn, Telekom Dome, att: 6.000
SCORE: North – South 92-102

North: Jeff Gibbs 16, Darren Fenn 14, Ole Wendt, Anthony Canty, Lars Wendt, Sadam Eco, Sebastian Fulle, Mathis Monninghoff, Robin Christen, Niels Giffey, Daniel Theis, Stefan Arndt. Reserves: Konstantin Klein, Brian Wenzel, Martin Schmeling, Florian Koch. Coach: Henrik Rodl (Alba Berlin). Ass: Artur Gacaev (Paderborn Baskets)

South : Michael King 17, George Evans 16, Chris Ensminger 16, Nico Barth, Felix Engel, Jacob Krumbeck, Besnik Bekteshi, Patrick Heckmann, Kevin Bright, Dennis Ogbe, Danilo Barthel, Philipp Neumann, Justin Raffington. Reserves: Johannes Schulz, Kevin Luyeye, Moritz Naegele, Michael Wenzl. Coach: Wolfgang Ortmann (ASC Mainz). Ass: Felix Czerny (Team Urspring Alba Berlin)

== Slam dunk champions ==
Year	City	Dunk champion
2019	Trier	(United States) Austin Hollins
2018	Göttingen	(United States) Jamar Abrams
2017	Bonn	(United States) Brian Butler
2016	Bamberg	(United States) Garlon Green
2015	Neu-Ulm	(United States) Will Clyburn
2014	Bonn	(Germany) Rafal Lipinski (Amateur)
2013	Nürnberg	(United States) Justin Darlington (Amateur)
2012	Ludwigsburg	(Germany) Salu Benjamin Tadi (2)
2011	Trier	(Germany) Salu Benjamin Tadi
2010	Bonn	(United States) Jamal Shuler
2009	Mannheim	(United States) Keith Simmons
2008	Mannheim	(United States) Ray Nixon
2007	Köln	(United States) Jared Newson
2006	Köln	(Germany) Mico Ilic (Amateur)
2005	Köln	(Germany) Sascha Szymczak (Amateur) (2)
2004	Köln	(Germany) Sascha Szymczak (Amateur)
2003	Köln	(Germany) Manfred Weber (Amateur)
2002	Berlin	(Germany) Stipo Papic
2001	Berlin	(United States) Mark Miller
1999	Bielefeld	(Nigeria) Olumide Oyedeji (2)
1998	Köln	(Nigeria) Olumide Oyedeji
1997	Oberhausen	(United States) Dennis Woodall
1996	Bonn	(United States) Calvin Talford
1995	Karlsruhe	(Germany) Jens-Uwe Gordon (2)
1994	Karlsruhe	(Germany) Jens-Uwe Gordon
1993	Karlsruhe	(United States) James Marsh
1992	Karlsruhe	(Germany) Henning Harnisch (2)
1991	Karlsruhe	(Germany) Mike Knoerr
1990	Karlsruhe	(Germany) Henning Harnisch
1989	Hagen	(United States) Kevin Florent
1988	– (Note: The 1989 All-Star Game was canceled due to scheduling problems.)	–
1987	Ludwigsburg	(United States) John Devereaux

== Three-point champions ==
Year	City	Three-point champion
2019	Trier	(Germany) Per Günther (2)
2018	Göttingen	(Germany) Maodo Lô
2017	Bonn	(United States) Ryan Thompson
2016	Bamberg	(Germany) Per Günther
2015	Neu-Ulm	(United States) David Brembley
2014	Bonn	(United States) Calvin Harris
2013	Nürnberg	(United States) Demond Mallet
2012	Ludwigsburg	(Lithuania) Donatas Zavackas
2011	Trier	(United States) Jacob Burtschi
2010	Bonn	(United States) Taylor Rochestie
2009	Mannheim	(Canada) Osvaldo Jeanty
2008	Mannheim	(United States) Ernest Joseph Gallup
2007	Köln	(United States) Nick Jacobson
2006	Köln	(United States) Mike Penberthy
2005	Köln	(Lithuania) Vilius Gabsys
2004	Köln	(Germany) Jaison Maile
2003	Köln	(Germany) Ümit Ergün (Amateur)
2002	Berlin	(Germany) Alexander Hartung (Amateur)
2001	Berlin	(United States) Mike Hansen
1999	Bielefeld	(United States) Gary Collier
1998	Köln	(United States) Derrick Taylor
1997	Oberhausen	(United States) Keith Gatlin
1996	Bonn	(United States) Casey Schmidt
1995	Karlsruhe	(Germany) Michael Koch
1994	Karlsruhe	(United States) Mark Montgomery
1993	Karlsruhe	(Germany) Michael Koch (2)
1992	Karlsruhe	(Germany) Kai Nürnberger
1991	Karlsruhe	(Lithuania) Rimas Kurtinaitis
1990	Karlsruhe	(United States) Clinton Wheeler (2)
1989	Hagen	(United States) Clinton Wheeler
1988	– (Note: The 1989 All-Star Game was canceled due to scheduling problems.)	–
1987	Ludwigsburg	?

== Topscorers ==
Year	Player	Points	Team
1998-99	(United States) Marc Suhr	20	BB Trier
2001	(United States) John Best	23	Bayer Giants Leverkusen
2002	(United States) Wendell Alexis	20	Alba Berlin
2003			
2004	(Lithuania) Rimantas Kaukenas	22	Telekom Baskets Bonn
2005	(United States) Immanuel McElroy (United States) Brian Brown	16	RheinEnergie Koln; TBB Trier
2006			
2007	(United States) Sharrod Ford (Germany) Stefano Garris	21	Alba Berlin; Skyliners Frankfurt
2008	(United States) Julius Jenkins	22	Alba Berlin
2009	(Germany) Tim Ohlbrecht	18	Telekom Baskets Bonn
2010	(United States) Michael King	17	BSG Basket Ludwigsburg
2011	(United States) Torrell Martin	19	Eisbären Bremerhaven
2012	(United States) John Bryant	23	Ratiopharm Ulm
2013	(Germany) Jan-Hendrik Jagla	20	FC Bayern Munich
2014	(United States) Isaiah Swann	25	Phantoms Braunschweig
2015	(United States) Javon McCrea	19	Medi Bayreuth
2016	(Germany) Per Guenther	21	Ratiopharm Ulm
2017	(Germany) Philipp Schwethelm (Germany) Maximilian Kleber (United States) Raymar Morgan	21	EWE Baskets Oldenburg; FC Bayern Munich; Ratiopharm Ulm
2018	(United States) Peyton Siva	23	Alba Berlin
2019	(Cuba) (Germany) Yorman Polas Bartolo	23	Telekom Baskets Bonn

== Players with most selections ==
Player	All-Star	Editions	Notes
(Germany) Per Günther	8	2011, 2012, 2013, 2014, 2015, 2016, 2018 and 2019	1x MVP (2016)
(Germany) Pascal Roller	7	2002, 2003, 2004, 2005, 2006, 2008 and 2009	
(United States) Wendell Alexis	7	1997, 1998, 1999, 2000, 2001 and 1996, 2002	1x MVP (1998)
(United States) Chris Ensminger	6	2002, 2003, 2004, 2005, 2006 and 2009	
(United States) Demond Mallet	5	2002, 2004, 2005, 2006 and 2007	1x MVP (2007)
(Germany) Robert Garrett	5	2000, 2001, 2002, 2004 and 2007	
(Germany) Philipp Schwethelm	5	2011–2013, 2015, 2017	1x MVP
(United Kingdom) (United States) Eric Taylor	5	1993, 1994, 1995, 1996 and 1997	
(United States) Julius Jenkins	4	2008, 2009, 2011 and 2014	1x MVP
(United States) John Bryant	4	2012-2015	2x MVP
(Germany) Henrik Rodl	4	1994, 1997, 2000 and 2001	
(Germany) Robin Benzing	3	2011, 2012 and 2013	
(Germany) Mithat Demirel	3	2001, 2003 and 2004 (DNP)	
(Germany) Kai Nürnberger	3	1993, 1994 and 2000	
(United States) (Montenegro) Tyrese Rice	3	2011, 2012 and 2013	
(Germany) Philip Zwiener	3	2011, 2012 and 2104	
(Socialist Federal Republic of Yugoslavia) Saša Obradović	3	1997, 2002 and 2003	
(Socialist Federal Republic of Yugoslavia) (Germany) Marko Pesic	3	1999, 2001 and 2003	
(Socialist Federal Republic of Yugoslavia) Jovo Stanojević	3	2003, 2004 and 2005	
(United States) Darren Fenn	3	2006, 2007 and 2008	1x MVP
(United States) Clint Harrison	3	2002, 2003 and 2004	
(Germany) Maik Zirbes	3	2012, 2013 and 2014	

== Distinctions ==
=== Basketball Hall of Fame ===
- (Germany) Dirk Nowitzki

== See also ==
- Basketball in Germany
- German Basketball League
- German Basketball League Champions
- German Basketball League Awards
- German Basketball Cup
- German Basketball Supercup

== Sources ==
- All the AS Games on Eurobasket
- Archive Bundesliga
