= 2017–18 Basketball Bundesliga =

German basketball season

Basketball Bundesliga
- Season: 2017–18
- Dates: 29 September 2017 – 17 June 2018
- Teams: 18

Regular season
- Top seed: Bayern Munich
- Season MVP: (United States) Luke Sikma
- Relegated: Rockets; Tigers Tübingen

Finals
- Champions: Bayern Munich (4th title)
- Runners-up: Alba Berlin
- Semi-finalists: Brose Bamberg; MHP Riesen Ludwigsburg
- Finals MVP: (Germany) Danilo Barthel

Statistical leaders
Points	(Canada) Philip Scrubb	18.3
Rebounds	(United States) John Bryant	10.6
Assists	(United States) Jared Jordan	6.4

Records
- Average attendance: 4,205

Seasons
- ← 2016–17 2018–19 →

The 2017–18 Basketball Bundesliga, known as the easyCredit BBL for sponsorship reasons, was the 52nd season of the Basketball Bundesliga (BBL), the top-tier level of professional club basketball in Germany. The defending champion was Brose Bamberg. The regular season started on 29 September 2017 and ended 1 May 2018.

Bayern Munich won their fourth title and qualified for the 2018–19 EuroLeague.

== Notable occurrences ==
- For the first time in BBL history, two windows for FIBA national team play were planned in which the competition stopped. These were in November 2017 and February 2018.
- A number of nine teams participated in European club competitions this season, the highest number ever in German basketball history.

== Teams ==
Location of teams in 2017–18 Basketball Bundesliga

=== Promotion and relegation ===
Relegated from BBL

Rasta Vechta and Phoenix Hagen were relegated from the BBL after the 2016–17 season, as they finished in the last two places.

Promoted from ProA

Mitteldeutscher BC and Rockets got promoted from the 2016–17 ProA.

=== Arenas and locations ===
Team	City	Arena	Capacity
Brose Bamberg	Bamberg	Brose Arena	6,150
Medi Bayreuth	Bayreuth	Oberfrankenhalle	4,000
Alba Berlin	Berlin	Mercedes-Benz Arena	14,500
Telekom Baskets Bonn	Bonn	Telekom Dome	6,000
Löwen Braunschweig	Braunschweig	Volkswagen Halle	6,600
Eisbären Bremerhaven	Bremerhaven	Bremerhaven Stadthalle	4,050
Skyliners Frankfurt	Frankfurt	Fraport Arena	5,002
Gießen 46ers	Gießen	Sporthalle Gießen-Ost	4,003
BG Göttingen	Göttingen	Sparkassen Arena	3,447
Rockets (Note: Rockets Gotha started the season as "Oettinger Rockets", named after its main sponsor Oettinger Brauerei. However, from January 2018 the main sponsor left and the club would be simply known as "Rockets".)	Erfurt	Messe Erfurt	3,236
Science City Jena	Jena	Sparkassen-Arena	3,000
MHP Riesen Ludwigsburg	Ludwigsburg	MHP-Arena	5,300
Mitteldeutscher BC	Weißenfels	Stadthalle Weißenfels	3,000
Bayern Munich	Munich	Audi Dome	6,700
EWE Baskets Oldenburg	Oldenburg	Große EWE Arena	6,069
Tigers Tübingen	Tübingen	Paul Horn-Arena	3,132
ratiopharm Ulm	Ulm	Arena Ulm/Neu-Ulm	6,000
s.Oliver Würzburg	Würzburg	s.Oliver Arena	3,140

== Regular season ==
In the regular season, teams played against each other two times home-and-away in a round-robin format. The first eight teams advanced to the playoffs. The last two placed teams were relegated to the ProA for next season. The regular season started on 29 September 2017 and concluded 1 May 2018.

=== Standings ===
Pos	Team	Pld	W	L	PF	PA	PD	Pts	Qualification or relegation
1	Bayern Munich	34	31	3	3011	2573	+438	62	Playoffs
2	Alba Berlin	34	29	5	3044	2540	+504	58	Playoffs
3	MHP Riesen Ludwigsburg	34	26	8	2932	2574	+358	52	Playoffs
4	Brose Bamberg	34	22	12	2789	2594	+195	44	Playoffs
5	Telekom Baskets Bonn	34	21	13	2815	2667	+148	42 (Note: Bonn 6 Pts; Bayreuth 4 Pts; Oldenburg 2 Pts)	Playoffs
6	Medi Bayreuth	34	21	13	2849	2756	+93	42	Playoffs
7	EWE Baskets Oldenburg	34	21	13	2922	2822	+100	42	Playoffs
8	Fraport Skyliners	34	20	14	2649	2614	+35	40	Playoffs
9	s.Oliver Würzburg	34	19	15	2690	2578	+112	38	
10	ratiopharm Ulm	34	16	18	2748	2775	−27	32 (Note: Ulm 174–165 Gießen)	
11	Gießen 46ers	34	16	18	2949	3016	−67	32	
12	Basketball Löwen Braunschweig	34	14	20	2527	2741	−214	28 (Note: Braunschweig 154–151 Jena)	
13	Science City Jena	34	14	20	2677	2790	−113	28	
14	BG Göttingen	34	10	24	2684	2980	−296	20 (Note: Göttingen 185–174 MBC)	
15	Mitteldeutscher BC	34	10	24	2748	2957	−209	20	
16	Eisbären Bremerhaven	34	8	26	2647	2857	−210	16	
17	Rockets (R)	34	7	27	2566	2914	−348	14	Relegation to ProA
18	Tigers Tübingen (R)	34	1	33	2525	3024	−499	2	Relegation to ProA

Source: Beko BBL
Rules for classification: 1) Points; 2) Head-to-head; 3) Points difference; 4) Points scored.
(R) Relegated

=== Results ===
Home \ Away	BAM	BAY	BER	BON	BRA	BRE	FRA	GIE	GOT	JEN	LUD	MBC	MUN	OET	OLD	TUB	ULM	WUR
Brose Bamberg	—	88–73	75–77	83–65	82–55	79–74	75–67	87–84	100–61	80–71	80–73	103–66	63–71	85–80	95–82	97–63	80–77	70–67
Medi Bayreuth	85–75	—	83–76	97–85	84–62	84–74	69–62	96–75	86–83	75–88	70–73	82–74	77–86	93–72	98–102	85–71	88–75	86–80
Alba Berlin	81–75	100–68	—	90–69	88–81	64–66	106–69	88–66	98–71	100–67	96–86	91–71	70–80	95–61	91–83	99–63	102–73	80–76
Telekom Baskets Bonn	106–69	85–82	76–84	—	87–56	75–86	75–79	83–78	82–70	102–80	105–109	84–91	72–83	79–73	90–68	89–80	86–74	78–75
Löwen Braunschweig	68–94	75–100	62–72	73–76	—	81–68	77–74	85–96	91–86	69–68	67–74	71–63	82–91	82–68	99–88	94–77	80–73	73–71
Eisbären Bremerhaven	76–83	99–103	85–99	73–89	72–65	—	69–81	87–74	74–77	72–80	77–98	79–82	83–85	80–74	80–90	78–73	82–89	80–72
Fraport Skyliners	83–72	72–68	90–84	76–81	78–71	95–69	—	70–86	88–80	67–65	81–88	83–67	83–87	90–82	93–82	90–63	75–89	78–72
Gießen 46ers	96–105	107–96	102–87	80–86	84–79	89–73	83–59	—	102–111	84–60	98–118	107–99	53–87	71–96	95–99	110–98	70–84	80–86
BG Göttingen	105–98	70–93	69–88	65–91	75–79	81–78	95–92	78–94	—	86–60	62–88	96–90	72–78	75–88	85–93	95–75	84–94	81–74
Science City Jena	85–68	107–90	89–99	73–69	83–85	90–68	70–82	86–65	103–92	—	64–78	61–75	78–85	85–81	74–83	74–69	92–87	79–81
MHP Riesen Ludwigsburg	91–74	78–47	67–86	87–78	72–59	92–69	79–62	81–83	93–61	91–62	—	99–77	73–90	94–54	90–86	88–79	89–54	87–77
Mitteldeutscher BC	74–76	80–93	80–89	61–87	84–78	98–90	93–96	97–102	84–89	94–100	81–92	—	77–95	82–69	71–72	93–88	80–69	78–86
Bayern Munich	77–68	96–88	72–91	78–50	111–53	98–95	72–60	107–83	91–77	101–78	91–71	111–91	—	102–80	95–74	84–72	100–95	76–84
Rockets	64–92	65–82	68–98	70–93	87–92	98–90	56–77	81–90	74–63	97–101	72–89	70–74	59–98	—	74–94	100–82	79–81	85–77
EWE Baskets Oldenburg	81–74	88–89	81–88	82–86	86–84	85–73	74–90	98–82	97–75	79–69	79–87	86–84	100–77	88–68	—	83–75	94–83	61–75
Tigers Tübingen	73–81	77–87	75–125	75–84	69–77	75–87	57–65	83–106	80–67	64–91	75–93	99–100	72–87	83–90	61–92	—	74–81	57–73
ratiopharm Ulm	67–90	74–84	68–72	87–94	88–77	85–77	77–78	90–95	89–65	87–72	84–77	93–76	75–89	78–62	70–87	95–82	—	72–69
s.Oliver Baskets	76–73	82–68	76–90	80–78	72–45	74–64	81–64	96–79	95–82	85–72	94–87	71–61	74–80	79–69	84–86	84–69	74–91	—

Source: BBL
Legend: Blue = home team win; Red = away team win.
Matches with lighter background shading were decided after overtime.

== Playoffs ==
All three rounds of the playoffs are played in a best-of-five format, with the higher seeded team playing the first, third and fifth game at home.

Quarterfinals; 5–19 May
1	Bayern Munich	3
8	Fraport Skyliners	2
4	Brose Bamberg	3
5	Telekom Baskets Bonn	0
2	Alba Berlin	3
7	EWE Baskets Oldenburg	2
3	MHP Riesen Ludwigsburg	3
6	Medi Bayreuth	0

Semifinals; 20–31 May
1	Bayern Munich	3
4	Brose Bamberg	1
2	Alba Berlin	3
3	MHP Riesen Ludwigsburg	0

Finals; 3–16 June
1	Bayern Munich	3
2	Alba Berlin	2

== Awards and statistics ==
=== Major award winners ===
Award	Player	Club
Most Valuable Player	(United States) Luke Sikma	Alba Berlin
Finals MVP	(Germany) Danilo Barthel	Bayern Munich
Top Scorer	(Canada) Philip Scrubb	Fraport Skyliners
Best Offensive Player	(Canada) Philip Scrubb	Fraport Skyliners
Best Defender	(United States) Thomas Walkup	Riesen Ludwigsburg
Most Effective Player	(United States) John Bryant	Gießen 46ers
Most Effective Player	(Germany) Robin Benzing	s.Oliver Würzburg
Best German Young Player	(Germany) Andreas Obst	Rockets
Coach of the Year	(Spain) Aíto García Reneses	Alba Berlin

=== Statistical leaders ===
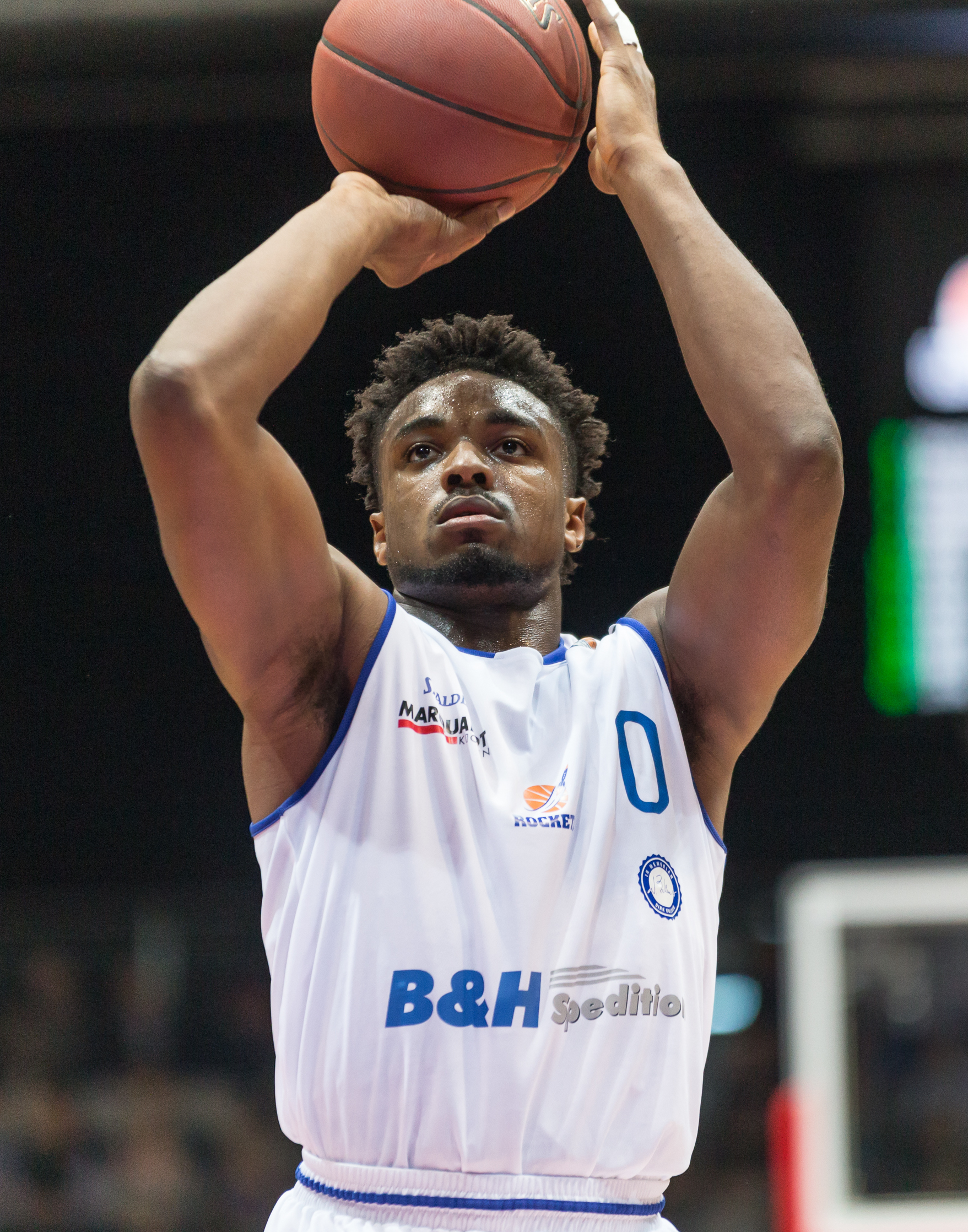
Retin Obasohan

Category	Player	Club	Average
Points	(Canada) Philip Scrubb	Fraport Skyliners	18.3
Rebounds	(United States) John Bryant	Gießen 46ers	10.6
Assists	(United States) Jared Jordan	Walter Tigers Tübingen	6.4
Steals	(Belgium) Retin Obasohan	Rockets	2.0
Blocks	(United States) Julian Gamble	Telekom Baskets Bonn	1.8
Turnovers	(New Zealand) Tai Webster	Fraport Skyliners	3.4

== All-Star Game ==
The 2018 BBL All-Star Game was played in the Lokhalle in Göttingen on 13 January 2018. Team International won the game 145–132 over Team National. Peyton Siva was named Most Valuable Player of the game.

(Germany) Team National
Pos	Player	Team	Selections
Starters
G	Per Günther	ratiopharm Ulm	7
G	Maodo Lô	Brose Bamberg	2
F	Robin Benzing	s.Oliver Würzburg	5
F	Danilo Barthel	Bayern Munich	5
C	Andreas Seiferth	Medi Bayreuth	3
Reserves
G	Dominic Lockhart	Göttingen	1
G	İsmet Akpınar	ratiopharm Ulm	1
G	Maurice Stuckey	s.Oliver Würzburg	3
F	T.J. DiLeo	Telekom Baskets Bonn	1
F	Andreas Obst	Rockets Gotha	1
F	Johannes Thiemann	MHP Riesen Ludwigsburg	2
C	Maik Zirbes	Bayern Munich	
G	Joshiko Saibou^{REP}	Alba Berlin	1
F	Yorman Polas Bartolo^{REP}	Telekom Baskets Bonn	1
Head coach	(Germany) Dirk Bauermann	s.Oliver Würzburg	4

Team International
Pos	Player	Team	Selections
Starters
G	(United States) Peyton Siva	Alba Berlin	1
G	(United States) Trey Lewis	ratiopharm Ulm	2
F	(United States) Rickey Paulding	EWE Baskets Oldenburg	7
F	(Egypt) Assem Marei	Medi Bayreuth	1
C	(United States) Devin Booker	Bayern Munich	1
Reserves
G	(United States) Thomas Walkup	MHP Riesen Ludwigsburg	1
G	(United States) Nate Linhart	Medi Bayreuth	1
G	(United States) Jared Cunningham	Bayern Munich	1
F	(United States) Josh Mayo	Telekom Baskets Bonn	2
F	(United States) Michael Stockton	Göttingen	1
C	(United States) Scott Eatherton	Löwen Braunschweig	1
C	(United States) Luke Sikma	Alba Berlin	1
Head coach	(Austria) Raoul Korner	Medi Bayreuth	2

- Injured player.
- REP Player selected as replacement.

== Clubs in European competitions ==
Team	Competition	Progress	Ref
Brose Bamberg	EuroLeague	12th qualified	
ratiopharm Ulm	EuroCup	Regular season	
Bayern Munich	EuroCup	Semifinals	
Alba Berlin	EuroCup	Top 16	
EWE Baskets Oldenburg	Champions League	Round of 16	
medi bayreuth	Champions League	Quarterfinals	
Telekom Baskets Bonn	Champions League	Regular season	
MHP Riesen Ludwigsburg	Champions League	Fourth place	
s.Oliver Würzburg	FIBA Europe Cup	First qualifying round	

== See also ==
- 2018 BBL-Pokal
