= Maurice Stuckey =

German basketball player (born 1990)

Personal information
- Born: 30 May 1990 (age 36) Augsburg, Germany
- Listed height: 6 ft 2 in (1.88 m)
- Listed weight: 200 lb (91 kg)

Career information
- Playing career: 2009–2026
- Position: Shooting guard
- Number: 3

Career history
- 2009–2012: Brose Baskets
- 2012–2014: s.Oliver Würzburg
- 2014–2015: EWE Baskets Oldenburg
- 2015–2018: s.Oliver Würzburg
- 2018–2019: Brose Bamberg
- 2019–2026: Crailsheim Merlins

Career highlights
- 3x BBL All-Star (2016–2018)

Maurice Stuckey (born 30 May 1990) is a German former professional basketball player, who played for 17 seasons, mainly in the German Basketball Bundesliga and ProA. He retired at the end of the 2025–26 season, last playing for the Crailsheim Merlins.

== Professional career ==
On 23 May 2018, he signed with Brose Bamberg. Stuckey signed with Crailsheim Merlins on 5 December 2019. He averaged 8.9 points per game in 16 games, shooting 41.6% from three-point range. On 10 July 2020, Stuckey re-signed with the team.

== International career ==
In 2016, Stuckey was selected for the German national basketball team.
