= 2014–15 Basketball Bundesliga =

German basketball season

Beko BBL^{1}
- Duration: 2 October 2014 – 21 June 2015
- Games played: 612
- Teams: 18

Regular season
- Top seed: Brose Baskets
- Season MVP: (United States) Jamel McLean
- Relegated: TBB Trier; Artland Dragons (Note: Artland Dragons resigned its position in the BBL. Due to Artland's withdrawal, Crailsheim Merlins, which finished in a relegation spot, remained in the Bundesliga.)

Finals
- Champions: Brose Baskets; 7th title
- Runners-up: Bayern Munich
- Finals MVP: (United States) Brad Wanamaker

Statistical leaders
Points	(United States) D.J. Kennedy	18.0
Rebounds	(United States) Jon Brockman	9.8
Assists	(Serbia) Branislav Ratkovica	7.2

Records
- Average attendance: 4,431

Seasons
- ← 2013–14 2015–16 →
- ^{1} Sponsored league name, referring to Beko.

The Basketball Bundesliga 2014–15 was the 49th season of the Basketball Bundesliga. The regular season started on 2 October 2014 and ended on 3 May 2015. The Playoffs started on 9 May and ended on 21 June 2015.

Brose Baskets was the top seed in the regular season. The team also won the title, after it beat Bayern Munich 3–2 in the Finals. TBB Trier and Crailsheim Merlins finished in the relegation places, but due to Artland Dragons withdrawing from the Bundesliga, Crailsheim accepted an offer to remain in the Bundesliga for 2015–16.

== Team information ==
BBL 2014–15 – Club Locations

Team	City	Arena	Capacity
Brose Baskets	Bamberg	Stechert Arena	6,800
Medi Bayreuth	Bayreuth	Oberfrankenhalle	4,000
Alba Berlin	Berlin	O_{2} World Berlin	14,500
Telekom Baskets Bonn	Bonn	Telekom Dome	6,000
Basketball Löwen Braunschweig	Braunschweig	Volkswagen Halle	6,600
Eisbären Bremerhaven	Bremerhaven	Bremerhaven Stadthalle	4,050
Crailsheim Merlins	Crailsheim	Arena Hohenlohe	3,000
Fraport Skyliners	Frankfurt	Fraport Arena	5,002
BG Göttingen	Göttingen	Sparkassen Arena	3,447
Phoenix Hagen	Hagen	Enervie Arena	3,402
MHP Riesen Ludwigsburg	Ludwigsburg	MHPArena	5,300
Bayern Munich	Munich	Audi Dome	6,700
EWE Baskets Oldenburg	Oldenburg	Große EWE Arena	6,069
Artland Dragons	Quakenbrück	Artland-Arena	3,000
TBB Trier	Trier	Arena Trier	5,900
Walter Tigers Tübingen	Tübingen	Paul Horn-Arena	3,132
ratiopharm ulm	Ulm	Ratiopharm Arena	6,000
Mitteldeutscher BC	Weißenfels	Stadthalle Weißenfels	3,000

== Standings ==
Pos	Team	Pld	W	L	PF	PA	PD	Pts	Qualification or relegation
1	Brose Baskets	34	29	5	2872	2389	+483	58	Qualification to playoffs
2	Alba Berlin	34	28	6	2875	2496	+379	56	Qualification to playoffs
3	Bayern Munich	34	26	8	3043	2555	+488	52	Qualification to playoffs
4	Telekom Baskets Bonn	34	23	11	2856	2738	+118	46	Qualification to playoffs
5	ratiopharm Ulm	34	21	13	2839	2846	−7	42	Qualification to playoffs
6	Skyliners Frankfurt	34	20	14	2635	2565	+70	40	Qualification to playoffs
7	EWE Baskets Oldenburg	34	19	15	2748	2681	+67	38	Qualification to playoffs
8	MHP Riesen Ludwigsburg	34	17	17	2727	2676	+51	34	Qualification to playoffs
9	Basketball Löwen Braunschweig	34	17	17	2619	2653	−34	34	
10	BG Göttingen	34	16	18	2745	2832	−87	32	
11	Artland Dragons (Note: Artland Dragons was supposed to be dissolved after the 2014–15 season, and thusfar left the league. Eventually, the team moved to the third division ProB.)	34	15	19	2744	2763	−19	30	Withdrew from Bundesliga
12	Mitteldeutscher BC	34	14	20	2558	2686	−128	28	
13	Phoenix Hagen	34	11	23	2701	2857	−156	22	
14	Tigers Tübingen	34	11	23	2729	2927	−198	22	
15	Eisbären Bremerhaven	34	10	24	2622	2810	−188	20	
16	Medi Bayreuth	34	10	24	2532	2734	−202	20	
17	TBB Trier (Note: TBB Trier were revoked six points (three wins) because of an insolvency.)	34	11	23	2445	2703	−258	16	Relegation to Pro A
18	Crailsheim Merlins	34	8	26	2568	2947	−379	16	Relegation to Pro A

Source: Beko BBL

=== Results ===
Home \ Away	BAM	BAY	BER	BON	BRA	BRE	CRA	FRA	GÖT	HAG	LUD	MUN	OLD	QUA	TRI	TÜB	ULM	WEI
Bamberg		99–64	98–69	89–68	77–57	83–82	90–61	81–62	94–75	97–75	65–59	80–63	89–82	89–77	84–44	100–59	101–74	80–62
Bayreuth	50–69		58–68	101–96	61–71	64–56	80–71	67–58	69–71	73–76	89–69	64–83	74–87	79–85	96–82	85–70	94–82	88–85
Berlin	72–78	91–60		90–78	80–63	87–74	92–71	85–79	110–74	78–74	93–76	83–80	83–91	97–58	86–83 ^{OT}	84–78	88–68	82–56
Bonn	85–80	77–59	74–83		92–71	97–81	79–76	76–70	66–65	80–92	87–80	88–84	70–59	99–77	88–71	89–80	87–93	96–66
Braunschweig	77–66 ^{OT}	88–80	64–71	72–75		92–61	89–76	86–76	79–81	87–66	82–78	70–88	80–71	89–79	80–74	86–72	78–86	83–97 ^{OT}
Bremerhaven	63–75	91–66	75–95	71–78	74–76		76–68	71–62	93–74	92–85	70–64	68–101	64–70	69–88	86–66	69–99	86–88	61–59
Crailsheim	83–103	88–84	65–93	87–90	80–82	76–91		59–66	80–84	84–91	89–81	66–103	62–85	85–103	100–84	72–85	80–88	73–71
Frankfurt	69–85	90–89	87–80 ^{OT}	84–71	84–72	88–79	88–71		74–70	104–105 ^{OT}	79–68	76–73	93–74	87–90 ^{2OT}	65–57	79–63	70–77	93–76
Göttingen	86–93	88–85	81–86	71–87	77–67	93–84	89–93 ^{OT}	74–62		73–83	81–85	63–59	79–91	70–83	73–87	115–112	92–80	66–89
Hagen	57–70	78–79	90–98	99–101 ^{OT}	82–91	84–85	40–0	70–79	88–93		79–95	74–97	83–122	79–91	70–77	90–81	96–98	65–70
Ludwigsburg	83–73	93–67	67–55	88–81	92–81	94–79	91–80	88–75	98–72	85–87		78–93	93–99	69–82	74–69	70–72	79–87	70–53
Munich	96–90	102–75	70–68	112–107 ^{OT}	76–80	90–84	110–76	80–73	81–95	124–79	102–76		80–65	91–75	92–51	107–81	100–93	86–63
Oldenburg	78–73	73–67	86–93	89–76	84–70	98–84	112–81	81–83	69–88	74–56	76–98	57–70		77–74	60–80	98–89	74–66	79–72
Quakenbrück	56–76	87–74	73–78	71–79	75–78	103–94 ^{OT}	99–100	83–74	73–84	81–85	71–72	63–77	92–85		82–69	97–64	77–82	71–86
Trier	61–74	78–75	54–91	74–80	79–65	85–84	67–82	58–75	68–94	75–62	60–75	79–74	71–65	69–77		79–76	78–83	89–81
Tübingen	81–92	75–71	68–90	77–83	93–76	84–80	91–78	77–82	72–82	69–92	83–76	80–117	94–82	86–90	85–76		83–92	75–54
Ulm	88–95	84–80	66–80	82–77	81–70	89–79	86–71	67–76	101–85	74–90	99–85 ^{OT}	76–87	78–83	88–86	93–77	103–96		63–84
Weißenfels	71–84	73–65	81–96	96–99 ^{OT}	72–67	89–66	84–87	62–73	91–86	80–79	66–78	59–95	78–76	83–76	77–74	90–79	82–86	

Legend: Blue = home team win; Red = away team win.

== Playoffs ==
=== Bracket ===
Quarterfinals
1	Brose Baskets	3
8	MHP Ludwigsburg	0
4	Telekom Baskets Bonn	2
5	ratiopharm Ulm	3
3	Bayern Munich	3
6	Skyliners Frankfurt	1
2	Alba Berlin	3
7	EWE Baskets Oldenburg	0

Semifinals
1	Brose Baskets	3
5	ratiopharm Ulm	0
3	Bayern Munich	3
2	Alba Berlin	2

Final
1	Brose Baskets	3
3	Bayern Munich	2

== Statistical leaders ==
=== Points ===
Pos	Player	Club	PPG
1	(United States) D.J. Kennedy	MHP RIESEN	17.8
2	(United States) David Bell	Phoenix Hagen	17.7
3	(United States) Raymar Morgan	BG Göttingen	16.2

=== Rebounds ===
Pos	Player	Club	RPG
1	(United States) Jon Brockman	MHP RIESEN	9.8
2	(United States) Devin Searcy	Eisbären Bremerhaven	8.2
3	(United States) John Bryant	Bayern Munich	7.5

=== Assists ===
Pos	Player	Club	APG
1	(Serbia) Branislav Ratkovica	Walter Tigers Tübingen	7.2
2	(United States) Dru Joyce	Löwen Braunschweig	6.0
3	(United States) Lorenzo Williams	Eisbären Bremerhaven	5.9

== Awards ==
Most Valuable Player

- (United States) Jamel McLean – Alba Berlin

Finals MVP

- (United States) Bradley Wanamaker – Brose Baskets

Coach of the Year

- (Serbia) Saša Obradović – Alba Berlin

Most Improved Player

- (Germany) Johannes Voigtmann – Skyliners Frankfurt

Best German Young Player

- (Germany) Johannes Voigtmann – Skyliners Frankfurt

Best Offensive Player

- (United States) D. J. Kennedy – MHP Riesen Ludwigsburg

Best Defensive Player

- (United States) Cliff Hammonds – Alba Berlin

== All-Star Game ==
(Germany) Team National
Pos	Player	Team
Starters
G	Per Günther	ratiopharm Ulm
F	Niels Giffey	Alba Berlin
F	Philipp Schwethelm	ratiopharm Ulm
F	Daniel Theis	Brose Baskets
C	Tim Ohlbrecht	ratiopharm Ulm
Reserves
G	Heiko Schaffartzik	Bayern Munich
G	Anton Gavel	Bayern Munich
G	David Brembly	Medi Bayreuth
F	Christian Standhardinger	Mitteldeutscher BC
F	Danilo Barthel	Skyliners Frankfurt
F	Elias Harris	Brose Baskets
C	Johannes Voigtmann	Skyliners Frankfurt
Head coach: Thorsten Leibenath (ratiopharm Ulm)

Team International
Pos	Player	Team
Starters
G	(United States) David Holston	Artland Dragons
G	(United States) Reggie Redding	Alba Berlin
F	(United States) Jamel McLean	Alba Berlin
F	(United States) Will Clyburn	ratiopharm Ulm
C	(United States) John Bryant	Bayern Munich
Reserves
G	(United States) Kerron Johnson	MHP Riesen Ludwigsburg
G	(United States) Brad Wanamaker	Brose Baskets
G	(United States) Patrick Richard	Mitteldeutscher BC
G	(United States) Bryce Taylor	Bayern Munich
F	(United States) Raymar Morgan	BG Göttingen
F	(United States) Javon McCrea	Medi Bayreuth
C	(United States) Adam Chubb	EWE Baskets Oldenburg
Head coach: (Serbia) Saša Obradović (Alba Berlin)

10 January 2015
20:30

Boxscore

Team National 101, Team International 110
Scoring by quarter: 22–21, 20–36, 29–23, 30–30
Pts: Tim Ohlbrecht 17; Rebs: Daniel Theis 12; Asts: Heiko Schaffartzik 8	Pts: Javon McCrea 19; Rebs: John Bryant 17; Asts: Kerron Johnson 6

Arena Ulm/Neu-Ulm, Ulm
Attendance: 6,000

== Broadcasting ==
On 17 June 2014 it was announced that, starting from this season, all BBL-games will be broadcast, as the league has signed a contract until 2018 with Telekom.

== See also ==
- 2015 BBL-Pokal
