= Basketball Bundesliga Most Valuable Player =

German basketball award

The Basketball Bundesliga MVP (Most Valuable Player) is an award that is given yearly to the best player in the regular season of the Basketball Bundesliga, which is the top professional basketball league in Germany.

== Winners ==
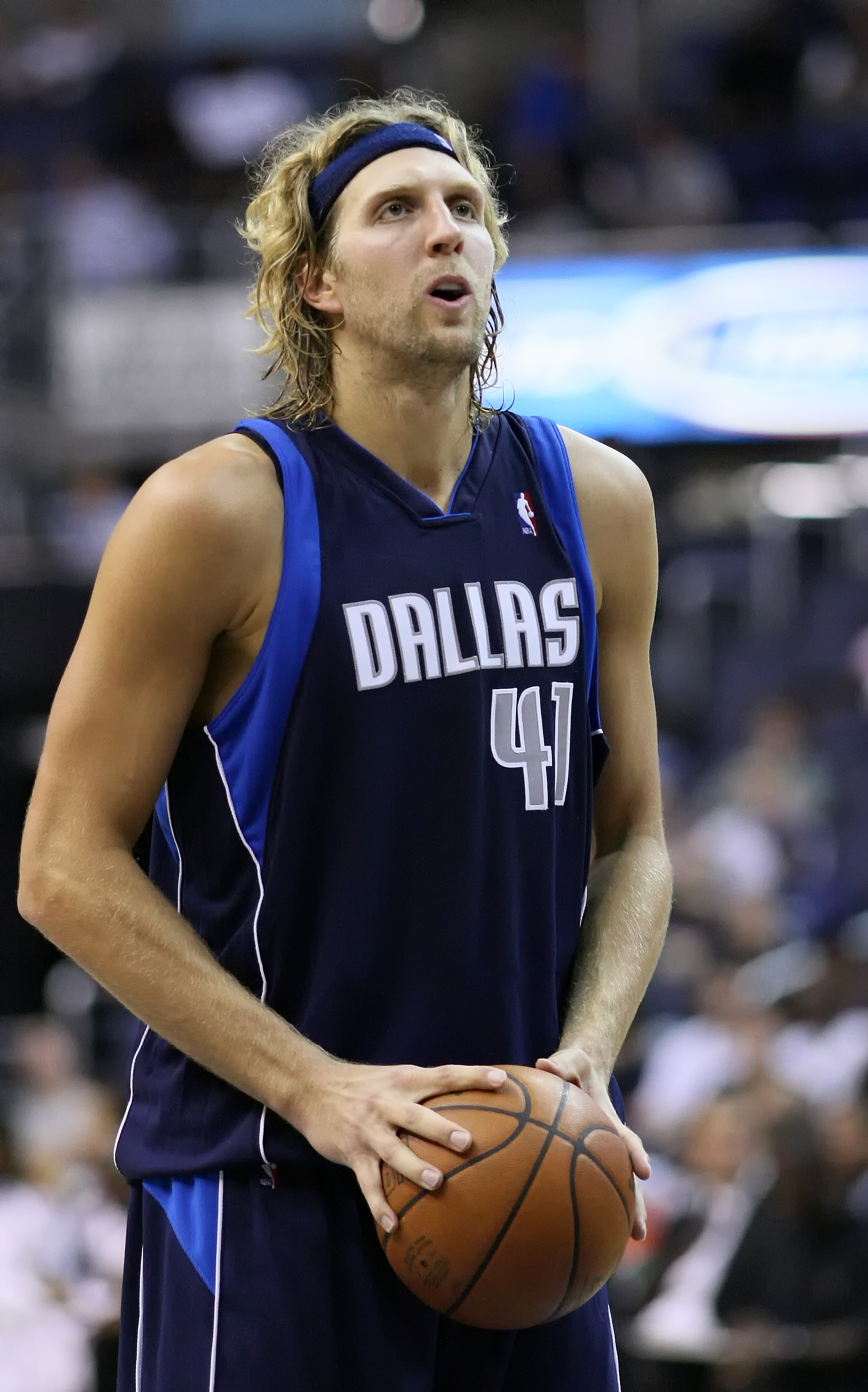
All-time great Dirk Nowitzki won the Basketball Bundesliga MVP award in 1999.

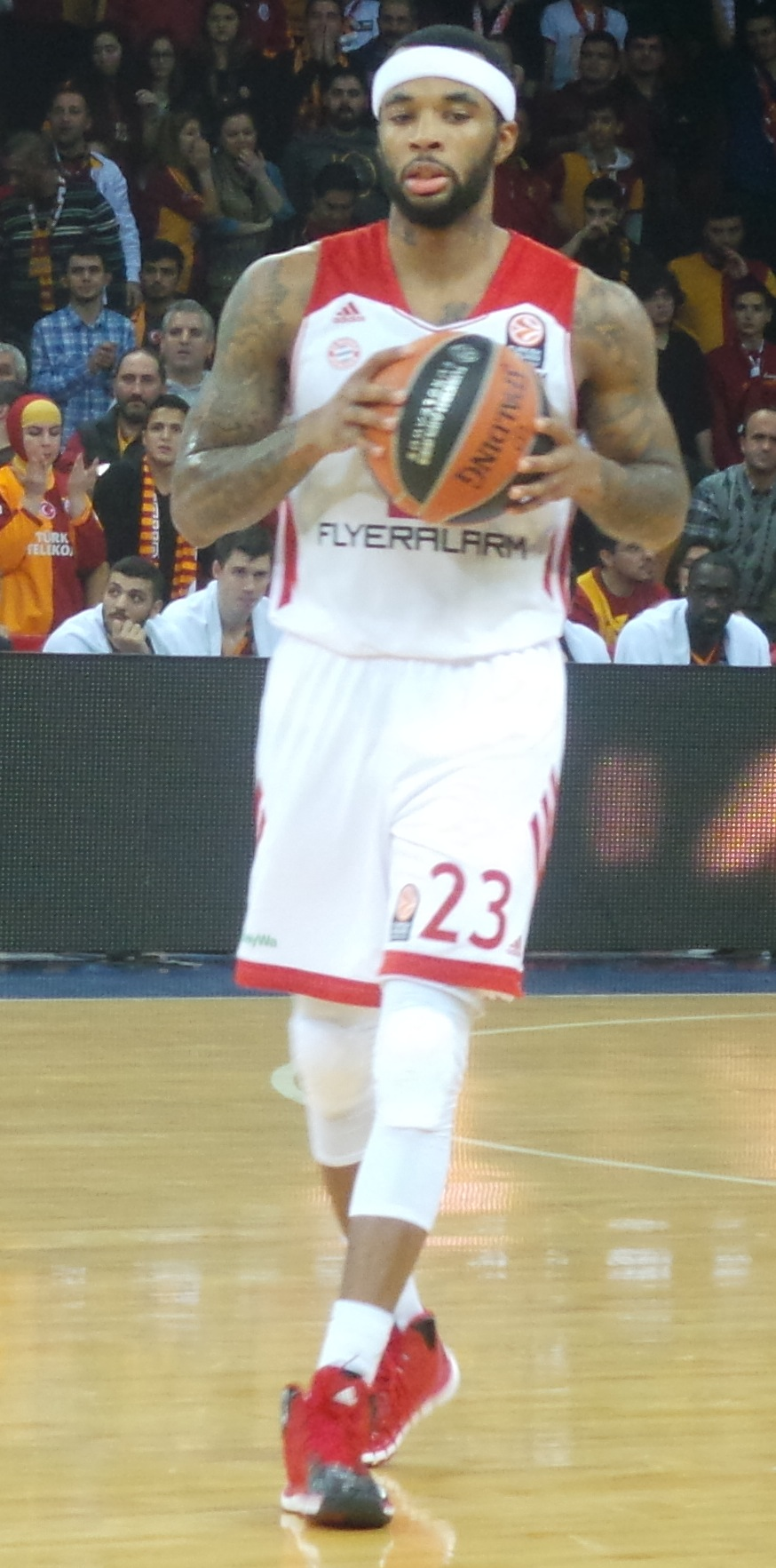
Malcolm Delaney won the Basketball Bundesliga MVP award in 2014.

Prior to 1994, the award was given as the German Player of the Year award, and was given to the "Best German Player" of the season, regardless of what league he played in. So to win the award, a player didn't even have to play in the German League. From 1994 onward, the German Player of the Year award was changed to instead mark the Most Valuable Player of the Basketball Bundesliga (German Basketball League).

Key
Player (X)	Name of the player and number of times they had won the award at that point (if more than one)
§	Denotes the club was Bundesliga champion in the same season
^	Denotes the player is still active in the BBL

German Player of the Year (1987–88 to 1992–93)
Season	Player	Position	Nationality	Team	Ref(s)
1987–88	Mike Jackel	Forward	West Germany	BSC Saturn Köln	
1988–89	Hansi Gnad	Center	West Germany	BSC Saturn Köln	
1989–90	Henning Harnisch	Forward	West Germany	TSV Bayer 04 Leverkusen	
1990–91	Henning Harnisch (2)	Forward	Germany	TSV Bayer 04 Leverkusen	
1991–92	Detlef Schrempf	Forward	Germany	Indiana Pacers	
1992–93	Kai Nürnberger	Guard	Germany	TTL Bamberg	
Basketball Bundesliga MVP (1993–94 to present)
1993–94	Teoman Alibegović	Forward	Slovenia	ALBA Berlin	
1994–95	Michael Koch	Guard	Germany	TSV Bayer 04 Leverkusen^{§}	
1995–96	Henrik Rödl	Forward	Germany	ALBA Berlin	
1996–97	Wendell Alexis	Forward	United States	ALBA Berlin^{§}	
1997–98	Wendell Alexis (2)	Forward	United States	ALBA Berlin^{§}	
1998–99	Dirk Nowitzki	Forward	Germany	DJK Würzburg	
1999–2000	Wendell Alexis (3)	Forward	United States	ALBA Berlin^{§}	
2000–01	Derrick Phelps	Guard	United States	ALBA Berlin	
2001–02	Wendell Alexis (4)	Forward	United States	ALBA Berlin^{§}	
2002–03	Jovo Stanojević	Guard	Serbia and Montenegro	ALBA Berlin^{§}	
2003–04	Pascal Roller	Guard	Germany	Opel Skyliners Frankfurt^{§}	
2004–05	Chris Williams	Forward	United States	Opel Skyliners Frankfurt	
2005–06	Jovo Stanojević (2)	Center	Serbia and Montenegro	ALBA Berlin	
2006–07	Jerry Green	Guard	United States	EnBW Ludwigsburg	
2007–08	Julius Jenkins^	Guard	United States	ALBA Berlin^{§}	
2008–09	Jason Gardner	Guard	United States	EWE Baskets Oldenburg^{§}	
2009–10	Julius Jenkins (2)^	Guard	United States	ALBA Berlin	
2010–11	DaShaun Wood	Guard	United States	Skyliners Frankfurt	
2011–12	John Bryant^	Center	United States	ratiopharm ulm	
2012–13	John Bryant (2)^	Center	United States	ratiopharm ulm	
2013–14	Malcolm Delaney	Guard	United States	Bayern Munich^{§}	
2014–15	Jamel McLean	Center	United States	ALBA Berlin	
2015–16	Brad Wanamaker	Guard	United States	Brose Baskets^{§}	
2016–17	Raymar Morgan	Forward/center	United States	ratiopharm Ulm	
2017–18	Luke Sikma^	Forward	United States	Alba Berlin	
2018–19	Will Cummings^	Guard	United States	EWE Baskets Oldenburg	
2019–20	No award was given, due to the shortened season because of the COVID-19 pandemic.				
2020–21	Jaleen Smith^	Point guard	United States	Riesen Ludwigsburg	
2021–22	Parker Jackson-Cartwright^	Point guard	United States	Telekom Baskets Bonn	
2022–23	T. J. Shorts^	Point guard	United States	Telekom Baskets Bonn	
2023–24	Otis Livingston II^	Point guard	United States	Würzburg Baskets	
2024–25	Jhivvan Jackson^	Guard	United States	FIT/One Würzburg Baskets	
2025–26	Andreas Obst^	Guard	Germany	Bayern Munich	

== Awards won by player ==
Player	Total	Years
(United States) Wendell Alexis	4	1997, 1998, 2000, 2002
(United States) John Bryant	2	2012, 2013
(Germany) Henning Harnisch	2	1990, 1991
(United States) Julius Jenkins	2	2008, 2010
(Serbia) Jovo Stanojević	2	2003, 2006

== Awards won by nationality ==
Country	Total
United States	23×
West Germany / Germany	11×
FR Yugoslavia	2×
Slovenia	1×

== Awards won by club ==
Club	Total
Alba Berlin	13×
Bayer 04 Leverkusen	3×
ratiopharm Ulm	3×
Skyliners Frankfurt	3×
Bamberg	2×
BSC Saturn Köln	2×
EWE Baskets Oldenburg	2×
Telekom Baskets Bonn	2×
Würzburg Baskets	2×
Bayern Munich	2×
DJK Würzburg	1×
EnBW Ludwigsburg	1×
