= Brad Wanamaker =

American basketball player (born 1989)

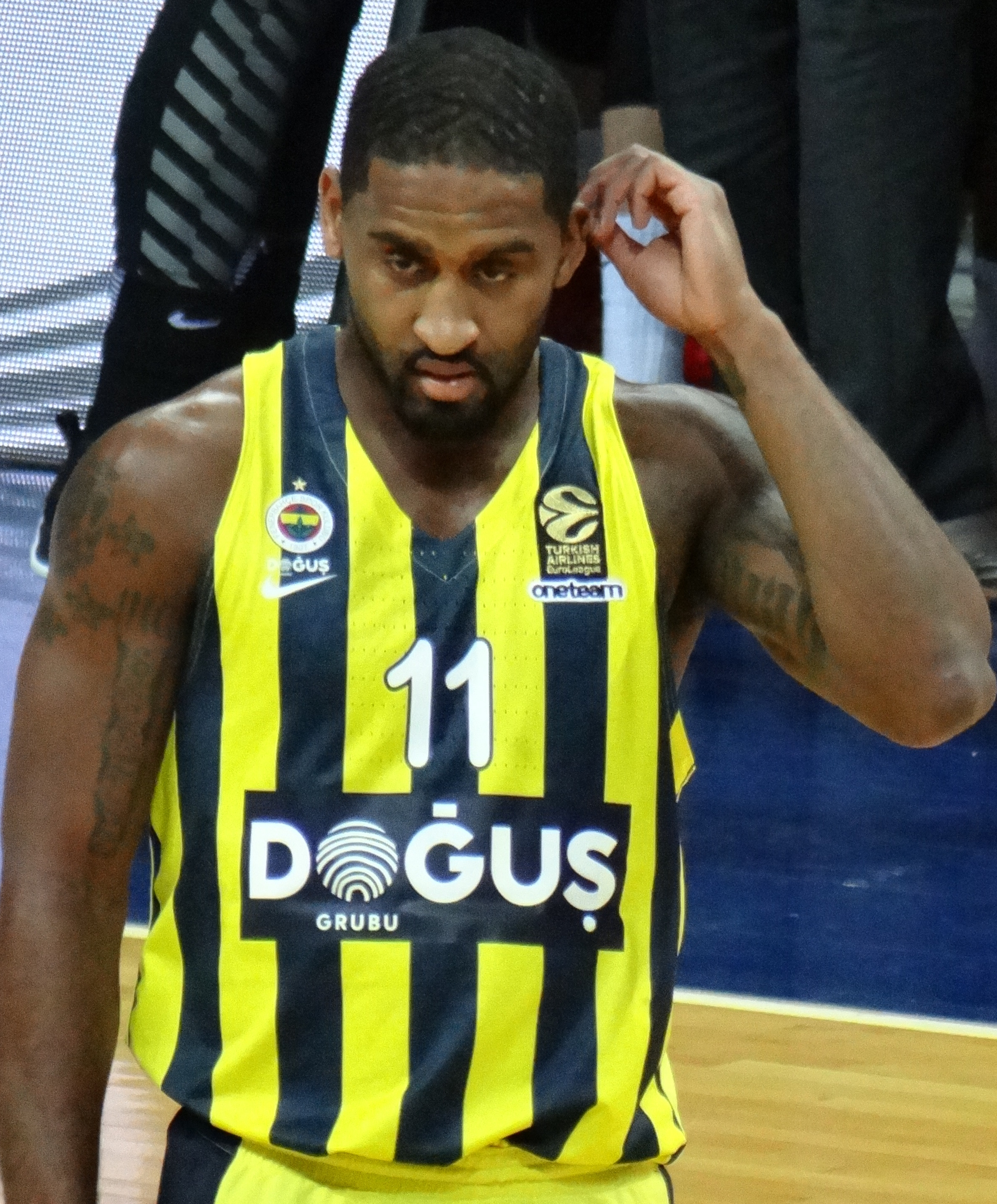
- Wanamaker with Fenerbahçe in 2017

Personal information
- Born: July 25, 1989 (age 37) Philadelphia, Pennsylvania, U.S.
- Listed height: 6 ft 3 in (1.91 m)
- Listed weight: 210 lb (95 kg)

Career information
- High school: Roman Catholic (Philadelphia, Pennsylvania)
- College: Pittsburgh (2007–2011)
- NBA draft: 2011: undrafted
- Playing career: 2011–2022
- Position: Point guard / shooting guard
- Number: 9, 10, 11, 22

Career history
- 2011: Teramo
- 2012: Forli
- 2012: Austin Toros
- 2012–2013: Limoges CSP
- 2013–2014: Pistoia
- 2014–2016: Brose Baskets
- 2016–2017: Darüşşafaka
- 2017–2018: Fenerbahçe
- 2018–2020: Boston Celtics
- 2018: →Maine Red Claws
- 2020–2021: Golden State Warriors
- 2021: Charlotte Hornets
- 2021: Indiana Pacers
- 2021–2022: Washington Wizards

Career highlights
- NBA D-League champion (2012); Turkish Super League champion (2018); Turkish Super League Finals MVP (2018); Turkish President's Cup winner (2017); 2× Turkish All-Star (2017, 2018); All-EuroLeague Second Team (2017); Zadar Tournament champion (2017); 2× Bundesliga champion (2015, 2016); Bundesliga Finals MVP (2015); Bundesliga MVP (2016); Bundesliga Best Offensive Player (2016); 2× Bundesliga First Team (2015, 2016); 2× German BBL All-Star (2015, 2016); German BBL All-Star Game MVP (2015); French Supercup winner (2012); AP honorable mention All-American (2011)
- Stats at NBA.com
- Stats at Basketball Reference

Bradley Daniel Wanamaker (born July 25, 1989) is an American former professional basketball player who played four seasons in the National Basketball Association (NBA). He played college basketball for the Pittsburgh Panthers. Wanamaker earned an All-EuroLeague Second Team selection in 2017.

== High school career ==
Born in Philadelphia, Wanamaker went to Roman Catholic High School in his hometown, where he played high school basketball. In 2007, he was named the Philadelphia Daily News' Player of the Year as a high school senior.

== College career ==
Wanamaker then went on to play college basketball at the University of Pittsburgh, where he played with the Pittsburgh Panthers, under head coach Jamie Dixon. In his four years at Pitt, Wanamaker scored 1,090 points. As a senior, he was named an honorable mention NCAA Men's Basketball All-American, by the Associated Press.

== Professional career ==
=== Teramo (2011) ===
After going undrafted in the 2011 NBA draft, Wanamaker split time in the 2011–12 season between two Italian clubs, the first of which was Banca Teramo Basket

=== Forli (2012) ===
Wanamaker played for Fulgor Libertas Forli in 2012.

=== Austin Toros (2012) ===
Wanamaker returned to the United States to join the Austin Toros. He joined the Toros just in time to help the team to an NBA Development League title in 2012. Wanamaker had workouts with many NBA teams but was never offered a contract. He also competed in the NBA Summer League several times.

=== Limoges (2012–2013) ===
For the 2012–13 season, Wanamaker moved to Limoges of France's top league, the LNB Pro A, where he averaged 9.0 points and 3.4 rebounds per game.

=== Pistoia (2013–2014) ===
The following season, Wanamaker returned to Italy and signed with Giorgio Tesi Pistoia of Lega Basket Serie A.

=== Brose (2014–2016) ===
On July 2, 2014, Wanamaker signed with Brose Baskets of Germany's Basketball Bundesliga. With Bamberg, he won the 2014–15 Bundesliga and was also named Finals MVP. On June 23, 2015, Wanamaker re-signed with Bamberg for one more season. In the 2015–16 season, Brose played in the EuroLeague, and had a solid season, in which the team reached the Top 16. In the German BBL, Wanamaker was named the Most Valuable Player, after leading the Bamberg team to a second straight national domestic league championship.

=== Darüşşafaka (2016–2017) ===
On June 23, 2016, Wanamaker signed a two-year contract with Turkish club Darüşşafaka Doğuş.

=== Fenerbahçe (2017–2018) ===
On September 7, 2017, Wanamaker signed a one-year contract with the 2017 EuroLeague champions, Fenerbahçe Doğus. In the 2017–18 EuroLeague season, Fenerbahçe made it to the 2018 EuroLeague Final Four, its fourth consecutive Final Four appearance. Eventually, they lost 85–80 to Real Madrid in the final game. In 36 EuroLeague games, he averaged 11.3 points, 2.7 rebounds and 3.8 assists per game, while shooting 41% on his field goal attempts.

=== Boston Celtics (2018–2020) ===
On July 2, 2018, Wanamaker signed a one-year contract with the Boston Celtics. Wanamaker made his NBA debut on October 16, recording two points and one rebound in a blowout 105–87 win over the Philadelphia 76ers.

On July 17, 2019, the Boston Celtics announced that they had re-signed Wanamaker. Wanamaker finished the 2019–20 season as the leader in free throw percentage.

=== Golden State Warriors (2020–2021) ===
On November 24, 2020, Wanamaker signed with the Golden State Warriors as a free agent to play backup point guard behind Stephen Curry. In 39 games, Wanamaker averaged 16 minutes and 4.7 points a game.

=== Charlotte Hornets (2021) ===
On March 25, 2021, Wanamaker was traded to the Charlotte Hornets after being out of the Warriors rotation since the All Star break.

=== Indiana Pacers (2021) ===
On October 6, 2021, Wanamaker signed with the Indiana Pacers. On December 27, he was waived.

=== Washington Wizards (2021–2022) ===
On December 29, 2021, Wanamaker signed a 10-day contract with the Washington Wizards via the hardship exemption.

== Personal life ==
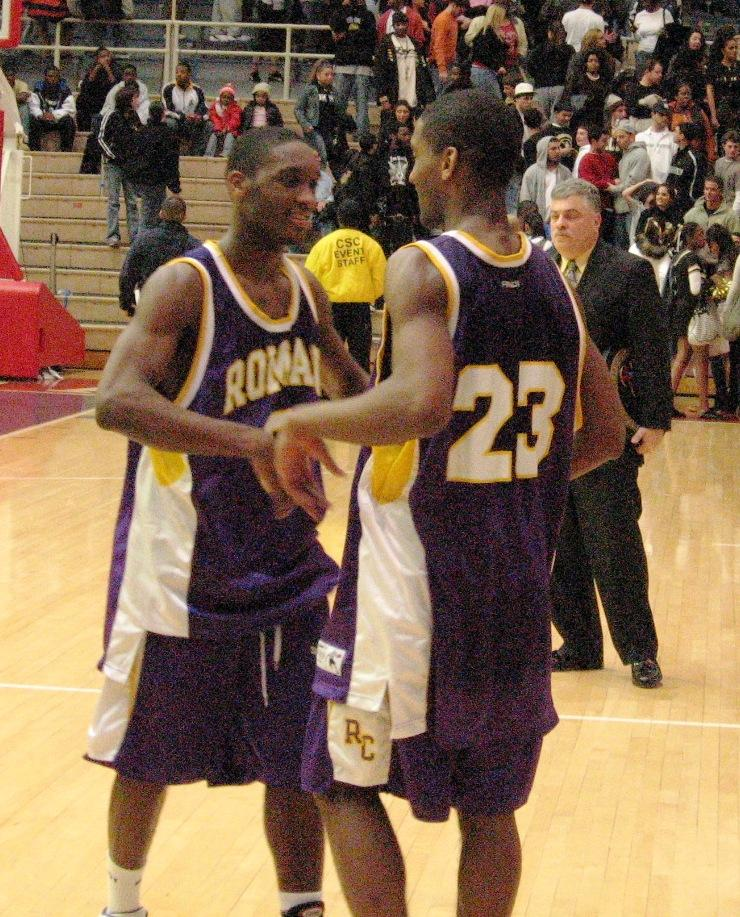
Wanamaker (right) with his twin brother, Brian, in 2006

Wanamaker is the twin brother of Lithuanian National Basketball League basketball player Brian Wanamaker. He was diagnosed with cancer in 2024.

== Career statistics ==
Legend
GP	Games played	GS	Games started	MPG	Minutes per game
FG%	Field-goal percentage	3P%	3-point field-goal percentage	FT%	Free-throw percentage
RPG	Rebounds per game	APG	Assists per game	SPG	Steals per game
BPG	Blocks per game	PPG	Points per game	PIR	Performance index rating
**Bold**	Career high

=== NBA ===
*	Led the league

==== Regular season ====
Year	Team	GP	GS	MPG	FG%	3P%	FT%	RPG	APG	SPG	BPG	PPG
2018–19	Boston	36	0	9.5	**.476**	**.410**	.857	1.1	1.6	.3	.1	3.9
2019–20	Boston	**71**	**1**	19.3	.448	.363	.926*	2.0	2.5	.9	**.2**	6.9
2020–21	Golden State	39	0	16.0	.353	.213	.893	1.7	**2.5**	.7	.2	4.7
2020–21	Charlotte	22	0	19.5	.429	.125	.889	1.8	3.4	.8	.2	6.9
2021–22	Indiana	22	**1**	13.3	.361	.235	.909	1.6	2.2	.2	**.3**	3.5
2021–22	Washington	1	**1**	**27.0**	.400	—	**1.000**	**4.0**	**7.0**	**2.0**	.0	**7.0**
Career		191	3	16.2	.421	.300	.907	1.7	2.4	.6	.2	5.5

==== Playoffs ====
Year	Team	GP	GS	MPG	FG%	3P%	FT%	RPG	APG	SPG	BPG	PPG
2019	Boston	4	0	4.3	.429	**1.000**	.750	.3	.8	.3	.0	2.5
2020	Boston	**17**	0	**16.1**	**.483**	.444	**.875**	**2.0**	**1.8**	**.7**	**.2**	**4.9**
Career		21	0	13.8	.478	.464	.850	1.7	1.6	.6	.2	4.5

=== EuroLeague ===
*	Led the league

Year	Team	GP	GS	MPG	FG%	3P%	FT%	RPG	APG	SPG	BPG	PPG	PIR
2015–16	Brose Bamberg	24	24	28.8	.443	.364	.775	**4.1**	4.0	1.3	.1	12.2	14.0
2016–17	Darüşşafaka	34	**33**	**33.5**	**.448**	**.386**	**.864**	3.1	**4.6**	**1.5**	**.9**	**16.7**	**17.6**
2017–18	Fenerbahçe	**36***	25	26.1	.410	.333	.855	2.7	3.8	1.3	.1	11.3	12.9
Career		94	82	29.5	.434	.363	.844	3.2	4.2	1.4	.1	13.5	14.9

=== College ===
Year	Team	GP	GS	MPG	FG%	3P%	FT%	RPG	APG	SPG	BPG	PPG
2007–08	Pittsburgh	30	0	11.0	.329	.167	.484	1.2	1.4	.4	.1	2.2
2008–09	Pittsburgh	**36**	0	19.0	**.462**	**.390**	.746	3.3	2.1	.8	.2	5.8
2009–10	Pittsburgh	34	**34**	**32.5**	.440	.362	.720	**5.7**	4.7	1.2	.3	**12.3**
2010–11	Pittsburgh	34	**34**	30.4	.448	.327	**.760**	5.2	**5.1**	**1.4**	**.4**	11.7
Career		134	68	23.5	.437	.344	.722	3.9	3.4	1.0	.2	8.1

== See also ==
- List of NBA annual free throw percentage leaders
