= Pascal Roller =

German basketball player (born 1976)

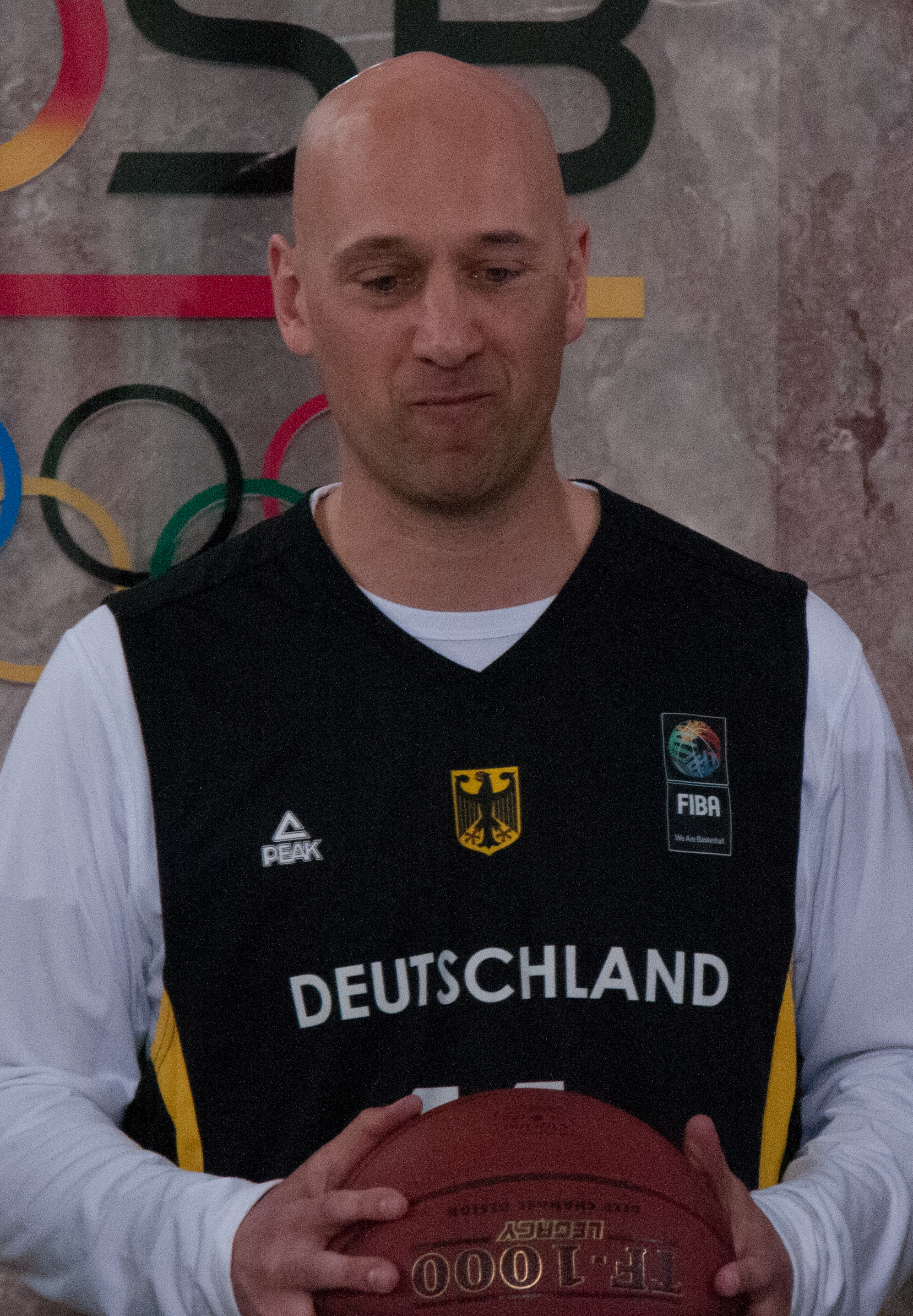
- Roller in 2016

Personal information
- Born: 20 October 1976 (age 50) Heidelberg, West Germany
- Listed height: 5 ft 11 in (1.80 m)
- Listed weight: 180 lb (82 kg)

Career information
- Playing career: 1996–2011
- Position: Point guard
- Number: 11

Career history
- 1996–1999: USC Freiburg
- 1999–2006: Frankfurt Skyliners
- 2006–2007: Biella
- 2007–2011: Frankfurt Skyliners

Career highlights
- FIBA EuroStar (2007); German League champion (2004); German Cup winner (2000); German League MVP (2004); 2× All-German League Team (2005, 2006); 7× German League All-Star; No. 11 retired by Skyliners Frankfurt (2011)
Medals
Men's basketball
Representing Germany
FIBA World Cup
Bronze medal – third place	2002 Indianapolis	{{{2}}}
FIBA EuroBasket
Silver medal – second place	2005 Serbia & Montenegro	{{{2}}}

Pascal Roller (born 20 November 1976) is a German former professional basketball player. At a height of 1.80 m (5 ft 11 in), and a weight of 81 kg (179 lb), he played at the point guard position.

== Professional career ==
Roller spent most of his pro club career with the Deutsche Bank Skyliners of the German League.

=== Clubs ===
Team	Country	League	from	until
USC Heidelberg	Germany	2.BBL	-	-
TV Langen	Germany	2.BBL	-	-
SV Tübingen	Germany	2.BBL	-	-
USC Freiburg	Germany	BBL	1998	1999
Deutsche Bank Skyliners	Germany	BBL	1999	2006
Biella	Italy	Serie A	2006	2007
Deutsche Bank Skyliners	Germany	BBL	2007	2011

== National team career ==
Internationally, Roller represented the Germany national team at FIBA tournaments. With Germany, he won the bronze medal at the 2002 FIBA World Cup, and the silver medal at the 2005 EuroBasket.

== Awards and accomplishments ==
=== Club ===
- German League champion (2004)
- German Cup winner (2000)

=== Germany national team ===
- 2002 FIBA World Cup: Bronze
- 2005 EuroBasket: Silver

=== Individual ===
- German select team at the Nike Hoop Heroes Tour: (1997)
- German League MVP: (2004)
- 2× All-German League Team: (2005, 2006)
- 7× German League All-Star
- FIBA EuroStar: (2007)
- 122 caps with the senior Germany national team
- Number 11 jersey retired by Skyliners Frankfurt: (2011)
