= Wendell Alexis =

American basketball player (born 1964)

Personal information
- Born: July 31, 1964 (age 62) Brooklyn, New York, U.S.
- Listed height: 6 ft 9 in (2.06 m)
- Listed weight: 220 lb (100 kg)

Career information
- High school: Christ the King (Queens, New York)
- College: Syracuse (1982–1986)
- NBA draft: 1986: 3rd round, 59th overall pick
- Drafted by: Golden State Warriors
- Playing career: 1986–2004
- Position: Power forward

Career history
- 1986–1987: Forum Valladolid
- 1987–1988: Real Madrid
- 1988–1990: Enichem Livorno
- 1990–1991: Ticino Siena
- 1991–1993: Pallacanestro Trapani
- 1993–1994: Maccabi Tel Aviv
- 1994: Pfizer Reggio Calabria
- 1995–1996: Levallois
- 1996–2002: ALBA Berlin
- 2002–2003: PAOK
- 2003–2004: Mitteldeutscher BC

Career highlights
- 2× FIBA EuroStar (1997, 1998); FIBA Korać Cup champion (1988); FIBA EuroCup Challenge champion (2004); 101 Greats of European Basketball (2018); 3× Italian League All-Star (1989, 1990, 1994); 6× German League champion (1997–2002); 3× German Cup winner (1997, 1999, 2002); 4× German League MVP (1997, 1998, 2000, 2002); 5× German League All-Star (1996–1999, 2002); German League All-Star Game MVP (1998); Israeli League champion (1994); Israeli Cup winner (1994); No. 12 retired by Alba Berlin; Second-team All-Big East (1986)
- Stats at Basketball Reference

Wendell Paul Alexis (born July 31, 1964) is an American former professional basketball player who played for several European clubs, between 1986 and 2004, most notably for ALBA Berlin, where he was voted MVP of the German Bundesliga four times, during his 6-year stay with the club. In 2018, he was named to the 101 Greats of European Basketball list.

== High school ==
Alexis attended and played basketball at Christ The King Regional High School, in Middle Village, Queens, New York.

== College career ==
Alexis played college basketball for the Syracuse Orangemen, from 1982 until 1986, being a starter during his senior year and earning All Big East Conference honors.

== Professional career ==
Alexis was drafted by the Golden State Warriors, just one pick ahead of future Hall of Fame member Dražen Petrović. Alexis never played in the National Basketball Association (NBA), though, but he went on to play in Europe until 2004. He settled in Spain for his first two years there, winning the Korać Cup in 1988, with Real Madrid. From 1988 until 1993, Alexis played in Italy, where he reached the domestic championship's finals in 1989, as a team member of Enichem Livorno. After a brief return to Forum Valladolid, he moved to Israel. As a player for Maccabi Tel Aviv, he won the Israeli League championship. Alexis spent another year in Italy, at Reggio Calabria, before joining French club Levallois.

He then moved to Berlin for ALBA, where he would stay until 2002. Alexis won the German League championship every season there, and he was chosen as the competition's MVP in 1997, 1998, 2000, and 2002. He is still the club's all-time leading scorer, with 5,922 points scored overall, being dubbed "Iceman" by the fans. Alexis competed in the FIBA EuroStars games of 1997–98 and 1998–99, as a member of the Western rosters.

After playing with the Greek club PAOK, for one year, Alexis returned to Germany, and won the FIBA Europe Cup (FIBA EuroCup Challenge) title with Mitteldeutscher BC.

== National team career ==
Alexis also represented the senior United States national team at the 1998 FIBA World Championship, where Team USA played without any NBA players being available, due to the NBA lockout. He won the bronze medal at the tournament, and he was the team's second best scorer.

== Coaching career ==
After the end of his active professional basketball playing career, Alexis worked as an assistant coach of the NJIT Highlanders college basketball team. In September 2008, Alexis was named an assistant coach of the NBA Development League's Austin Toros.
