= 2015–16 Basketball Bundesliga =

German basketball season

Beko BBL^{1}
- Season: 2015–16
- Duration: 2 October 2015 – 12 June 2016
- Teams: 18

Regular season
- Top seed: Brose Baskets
- Season MVP: (United States) Brad Wanamaker
- Relegated: Mitteldeutscher BC; Crailsheim Merlins

Finals
- Champions: Brose Baskets (8th title)
- Runners-up: ratiopharm Ulm
- Finals MVP: (United States) Darius Miller

Statistical leaders
Points	(United States) Kyle Fogg	18.2
Rebounds	(United States) Jon Brockman	9.2
Assists	(United States) Jared Jordan	8.5

Records
- Highest attendance: 14,052; Alba Berlin v Bayern Munich (15 November 2015)
- Average attendance: 4,408

Seasons
- ← 2014–15 2016–17 →
- ^{1} Sponsored league name, referring to Beko.

The 2015–16 Basketball Bundesliga was the 50th season of the Basketball Bundesliga. The regular season started on October 2, 2015, and the season ended with the last game of the Finals on June 12.

Brose Baskets defended their title.

== Team information ==
The ProA champions Gießen 46ers promoted to the BBL, along with runners-up s.Oliver Baskets. Crailsheim Merlins received a wild card from the league, to fill up the spot of Artland Dragons.

=== Stadia and locations ===
Location of teams in 2015–16 Basketball Bundesliga

Team	City	Arena	Capacity
Alba Berlin	Berlin	Mercedes-Benz Arena	14,500
Basketball Löwen Braunschweig	Braunschweig	Volkswagen Halle	6,600
Bayern Munich	Munich	Audi Dome	6,700
BG Göttingen	Göttingen	Sparkassen Arena	3,447
Brose Baskets	Bamberg	Stechert Arena	6,800
Crailsheim Merlins	Crailsheim	Arena Hohenlohe	3,000
Eisbären Bremerhaven	Bremerhaven	Bremerhaven Stadthalle	4,050
EWE Baskets Oldenburg	Oldenburg	Große EWE Arena	6,069
Gießen 46ers	Gießen	Sporthalle Gießen-Ost	4,003
Medi Bayreuth	Bayreuth	Oberfrankenhalle	4,000
MHP Riesen Ludwigsburg	Ludwigsburg	MHPArena	5,300
Mitteldeutscher BC	Weißenfels	Stadthalle Weißenfels	3,000
Phoenix Hagen	Hagen	Enervie Arena	3,402
ratiopharm ulm	Ulm	Ratiopharm Arena	6,000
s.Oliver Baskets	Würzburg	s.Oliver Arena	3,140
Fraport Skyliners	Frankfurt	Fraport Arena	5,002
Telekom Baskets Bonn	Bonn	Telekom Dome	6,000
Walter Tigers Tübingen	Tübingen	Paul Horn-Arena	3,132

=== Personnel and kits ===
Team	Coach	Kit manufacturer	Shirt sponsor
Alba Berlin	(Serbia) Saša Obradović	adidas	(China) ZhongDe Metal Group
Basketball Löwen Braunschweig	(Austria) Raoul Korner	Spalding	(Germany) Volkswagen
Bayern Munich	(Serbia) Svetislav Pešić	adidas	(Germany) BayWa
BG Göttingen	(Netherlands) Johan Roijakkers	K1X	(Germany) Sartorius
Brose Baskets	(Italy) Andrea Trinchieri	macron	(Germany) Brose Fahrzeugteile
Crailsheim Merlins	(Germany) Ingo Enskat	Hakro	(Germany) Hakro
Eisbären Bremerhaven	(Israel) Muli Katzurin	Owayo	(Germany) BLG Logistics
EWE Baskets Oldenburg	(Germany) Mladen Drijencic	Owayo	(Germany) EWE AG
Fraport Skyliners	(Canada) Gordon Herbert	PEAK	(Germany) Fraport
Gießen 46ers	(Germany) Denis Wucherer	K1X	(Germany) Rovema
medi bayreuth	(Germany) Michael Koch	K1X	(Germany) medi
MHP Riesen Ludwigsburg	(United States) John Patrick	PEAK	(Germany) MHP
Mitteldeutscher BC	(Croatia) Silvano Poropat	JAKO	(Germany) Puralube
Phoenix Hagen	(Germany) Ingo Freyer	Owayo	(Germany) Märkische Bank
ratiopharm Ulm	(Germany) Thorsten Leibenath	K1X	(Germany) ratiopharm
s.Oliver Baskets	(United States) Doug Spradley	K1X	(Germany) Knauf
Telekom Baskets Bonn	(Germany) Mathias Fischer	Spalding	(Germany) Deutsche Telekom
Walter Tigers Tübingen	(Serbia) Igor Perovic	Spalding	(Germany) Walter AG

== Regular season ==
=== Standings ===
Pos	Team	Pld	W	L	PF	PA	PD	Pts	Qualification or relegation
1	Brose Baskets	34	31	3	3053	2396	+657	62	Qualification to playoffs
2	EWE Baskets Oldenburg	34	27	7	2861	2656	+205	54	Qualification to playoffs
3	Skyliners Frankfurt	34	26	8	2688	2318	+370	52 (Note: Frankfurt 150–147 Munich)	Qualification to playoffs
4	Bayern Munich	34	26	8	3096	2644	+452	52	Qualification to playoffs
5	MHP Riesen Ludwigsburg	34	23	11	2799	2666	+133	46	Qualification to playoffs
6	Alba Berlin	34	22	12	2797	2518	+279	44	Qualification to playoffs
7	ratiopharm Ulm	34	21	13	2810	2687	+123	42	Qualification to playoffs
8	s.Oliver Baskets	34	17	17	2724	2793	−69	34 (Note: Würzburg 183–182 Gießen)	Qualification to playoffs
9	Gießen 46ers	34	17	17	2649	2691	−42	34	
10	Basketball Löwen Braunschweig	34	16	18	2545	2611	−66	32	
11	Telekom Baskets Bonn	34	12	22	2763	2947	−184	24 (Note: Bonn 149–146 Bayreuth)	
12	Medi Bayreuth	34	12	22	2550	2775	−225	24	
13	Phoenix Hagen (Note: Phoenix Hagen were deducted six points (three wins) for license violation. Hagen will also lose every potential tiebreaker.)	34	14	20	2851	3000	−149	22	
14	Tigers Tübingen	34	10	24	2689	2858	−169	20	
15	Eisbären Bremerhaven	34	9	25	2595	2826	−231	18 (Note: Bremerhaven 2 Pts, +17; Göttingen 2 Pts, −5; Weißenwels 2 Pts, −12)	
16	BG Göttingen	34	9	25	2596	2918	−322	18	
17	Mitteldeutscher BC	34	9	25	2673	2933	−260	18	Relegation to Pro A
18	Crailsheim Merlins	34	5	29	2464	2966	−502	10	Relegation to Pro A

Source: Beko BBL

=== Results ===
Home \ Away	BAM	BAY	BER	BON	BRA	BRE	CRA	FRA	GIE	GÖT	HAG	LUD	MUN	OLD	TÜB	ULM	WEI	WÜR
Bamberg		86–77	80–64	109–72	92–66	92–77	93–49	71–58	82–58	113–92	95–65	79–64	100–87	89–76	101–64	100–67	91–61	80–61
Bayreuth	53–85		78–82	77–64	58–98	99–89	78–70	82–69	72–74	85–70	88–93	75–77	69–92	85–73	82–75	76–90	82–77	81–74
Berlin	74–87	97–77		94–73	83–72	69–80	90–68	64–80	91–81 ^{OT}	84–66	108–72	74–78	90–74	93–95	91–73	74–54	89–58	83–90
Bonn	65–85	85–69	57–77		74–80	70–65	101–93	59–82	82–93	92–84	111–86	90–85	81–95	77–85	102–99	79–95	89–75	103–79
Braunschweig	63–79	96–88	95–93 ^{OT}	46–43		80–85	91–80	59–77	72–68	90–81	93–79	96–103 ^{OT}	63–82	58–76	83–79	77–84	90–83	73–52
Bremerhaven	72–91	73–71	53–97	87–72	63–78		72–64	59–67	74–82	81–90	89–96	73–93	80–86 ^{OT}	66–95	84–88	86–88	71–78	69–76
Crailsheim	53–93	73–70	75–80	91–89	79–88	81–66		56–72	56–100	63–96	89–80	74–75	78–89	66–90	74–91	99–90	71–85	70–81
Frankfurt	88–86	75–71	82–95	78–48	70–59	91–60	88–73		66–55	100–65	86–70	83–78	74–69	78–63	92–64	92–73	89–51	75–77
Gießen	81–80	68–69	71–104	87–72	73–71	82–67	83–79	61–86		74–66	90–83	65–78	61–87	79–88	86–90	91–69	74–69	81–79
Göttingen	63–87	91–62	63–88	75–68	63–67	77–99	79–70	71–84	91–86		84–94	83–91	65–94	74–79	65–80	74–95	77–83	85–78
Hagen	66–87	100–60	83–86	106–82	85–72	82–86	94–83	68–71	86–83	83–96		75–88	82–97	76–74	103–112	75–101	102–81	91–71
Ludwigsburg	62–77	88–85	90–80	85–77	83–61	78–71 ^{OT}	100–65	74–70	81–90	90–76	70–87		71–100	82–88	76–65	94–79	97–73	75–59
Munich	90–97 ^{OT}	94–65	96–65	84–91	91–70	96–86	106–59	78–76	88–68	114–73	113–80	95–92		82–56	95–70	101–85	92–84	103–79
Oldenburg	102–97	87–82	79–76	99–87	71–64	97–86	83–57	82–80	76–75	85–72	103–86	81–76	88–84		103–72	90–75	103–81	75–82
Tübingen	88–98	65–67	64–80	96–109	66–68	72–89	96–74	58–78	78–87	98–56	87–89	94–84	73–87	75–81		75–76	64–82	95–97
Ulm	83–93	77–80	78–68	82–97	76–67	85–67	83–79	68–61	8771	95–67	95–73	69–71	91–72	80–63	75–59		103–96	78–86
Weißenfels	68–98	89–77	75–84	92–84	83–71	82–89	97–76	64–79	68–70	85–99	72–79	69–77	93–90	87–93	76–83	78–88		76–87
Würzburg	67–80	79–60	69–80	83–68	69–68	81–79	97–77	87–91	104–101 ^{OT}	81–67	97–82	88–93	89–93	77–82	66–81	82–100	100–98	

== Playoffs ==
Quarterfinals
1	Brose Baskets	3
8	s.Oliver Baskets	0
4	Bayern Munich	3
5	MHP Riesen Ludwigsburg	2
3	Skyliners Frankfurt	3
6	Alba Berlin	0
2	EWE Baskets Oldenburg	1
7	ratiopharm Ulm	3

Semifinals
1	Brose Baskets	3
4	Bayern Munich	0
3	Skyliners Frankfurt	1
7	ratiopharm Ulm	3

Final
1	Brose Baskets	3
7	ratiopharm Ulm	0

== Awards ==
- Most Valuable Player

(United States) Brad Wanamaker (Brose Baskets)

- Finals MVP

(United States) Darius Miller (Brose Baskets)

- Best Offensive Player

(United States) Brad Wanamaker (Brose Baskets)

- Best Defensive Player

(United States) Quantez Robertson (Fraport Skyliners)

- Coach of the Year

(Canada) Gordon Herbert (Fraport Skyliners)

- Best Young Player

(Germany) Paul Zipser (FC Bayern Munich)

- Most Effective Players

(Germany) Daniel Theis (Brose Baskets)
(United States) Brian Qvale (EWE Baskets Oldenburg)

== All-Star Game ==
The 2016 All-Star Game was played at the Brose Arena in Bamberg. Per Günther was named the BBL All-Star Game MVP.

(Germany) Team National
Pos	Player	Team	Selections
Starters
G	Per Günther	ratiopharm Ulm	7
G	Karsten Tadda	Gießen 46ers	2
F	Patrick Heckmann	Brose Baskets	1
F	Daniel Theis	Brose Baskets	3
C	Johannes Voigtmann	Fraport Skyliners	2
Reserves
G	Maurice Stuckey	s.Oliver Baskets	1
G	Konstantin Klein	Fraport Skyliners	1
G	Brad Loesing ^{REP}	MHP Riesen Ludwigsburg	1
F	Nihad Đedović	Bayern Munich	3
F	Alex King	Alba Berlin	2
F	Niels Giffey ^{INJ}	Alba Berlin	2
F	Paul Zipser	Bayern Munich	1
F	Danilo Barthel	Fraport Skyliners	2
Head coach: Denis Wucherer (Gießen 46ers)

Team International
Pos	Player	Team	Selections
Starters
G	(United States) Brad Wanamaker	Brose Baskets	2
G	(United States) Dru Joyce	s.Oliver Baskets	1
F	(United States) Darius Miller	Brose Baskets	1
F	(Italy) Nicolò Melli	Brose Baskets	1
C	(United States) Jon Brockman	MHP Riesen Ludwigsburg	1
Reserves
G	(United States) Bryce Taylor	Bayern Munich	4
G	(United States) Will Cherry	Alba Berlin	1
G	(United States) Kyle Fogg	Eisbären Bremerhaven	1
F	(United States) Quantez Robertson	Fraport Skyliners	1
F	(Nigeria) Suleiman Braimoh	Gießen 46ers	1
F	(United States) Deon Thompson	Bayern Munich	2
C	(United States) Augustine Rubit	ratiopharm Ulm	1
Head coach: (Italy) Andrea Trinchieri (Brose Baskets)

- INJ Niels Giffey didn't play because of an injury.
- REP Brad Loesing was named as Giffey's replacement.

9 January 2016
20:30

Boxscore

Team National	128–118	Team International
Scoring by quarter: 24–31, 36–29, 35–27, 33–31
Pts: Per Günther 21; Rebs: Theis, Voigtmann 5 Asts: Johannes Voigtmann 8		Pts: Jon Brockman 23; Rebs: Jon Brockman 14; Asts: Kyle Fogg 8

Brose Arena, Bamberg
Attendance: 6,300
Referees: Konstantin Simonow, Carsten Straube, Steve Bittner

== Statistics ==
=== Season highs ===
Category		Player	Club
Points	37	(United States) David Bell	Phoenix Hagen
Rebounds	23	(United States) Tony Bishop	Eisbären Bremerhaven
Assists	18	(United States) Jared Jordan	Walter Tigers Tübingen
Steals	6	(United States) Chris Kramer	EWE Baskets Oldenburg
Steals	6	(United States) Roderick Trice	MHP Riesen Ludwigsburg
Blocks	6	2 occasions	
Three pointers	9	(United States) Brandon Jefferson	Phoenix Hagen

Source: RealGM
