= Chris Ensminger =

American basketball coach and player

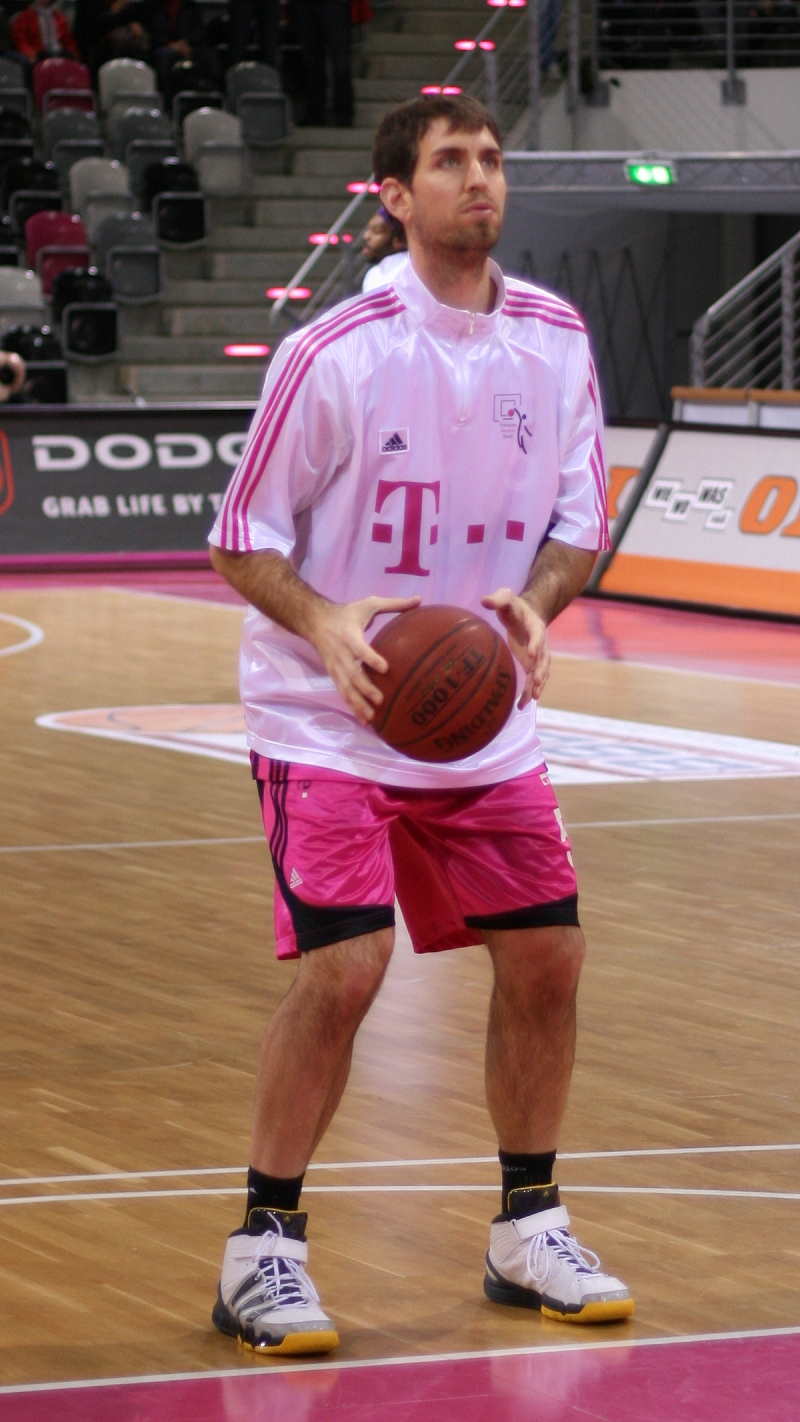
- Ensminger in 2010

Personal information
- Born: December 8, 1973 (age 52) Cincinnati, Ohio, U.S.
- Listed height: 6 ft 10.25 in (2.09 m)

Career information
- High school: Oak Hills (Cincinnati, Ohio)
- College: Valparaiso (1992–1996)
- NBA draft: 1996: undrafted
- Playing career: 1996–2013
- Position: Center
- Coaching career: 2013–present

Career history

Playing
- 1996–1997: Tours Basket
- 1997–1998: FC Porto
- 1998–1999: Namika Lahti
- 1999: North Harbour Kings
- 1999–2001: Mitteldeutscher BC
- 2001–2008: Brose Bamberg
- 2008–2009: Paderborn Baskets
- 2009–2013: Baskets Bonn

Coaching
- 2013–2017: Oettinger Rockets Gotha
- 2017–present: BBU Allgäu/Memmingen

Career highlights
- As a player: 4x All-German League Team (2005, 2008–2010)

Christopher William Ensminger (born December 8, 1973) is an American professional basketball coach and former professional basketball player.

== Playing career ==
=== High school ===
Born and raised in Cincinnati, Ohio, Ensminger played high school basketball at Oak Hills High School.

=== College career ===
Ensminger played four years of college basketball at Valparaiso University (1992–1996), amassing 1,061 points and 910 rebounds. He helped Valpo win Mid-Con titles in 1995 and 1996, and left as the school's all-time leader in career rebounds. His record would stand for 21 years until Alec Peters broke the record on January 16, 2017, against Wisconsin-Green Bay.

=== Professional career ===
Ensminger started his professional career with Tours Basket in the French 2nd Division ProB league, in 1996, followed by stints in Portugal (FC Porto) and New Zealand (North Harbour Kings).

In October 1998, he signed with Namika Lahti in Finnish Korisliiga.

In 1999, Ensminger signed with SSV Weißenfels of the German Basketball Bundesliga, establishing himself as a dominant post player in the league right away. After two years with the Weißenfels team, he signed with fellow Bundesliga side TSK universa Bamberg (later known as Brose Bamberg). In his seven-year stay with the club, Ensminger was instrumental in helping Bamberg to German League championships in 2005 and 2007. He also played in international competition with the club, including the EuroLeague and the ULEB Cup (now called EuroCup).

After parting ways with Bamberg, he spent the 2008–09 season with another German team, Paderborn Baskets, and finished his playing career with a four-year stint with the Telekom Baskets Bonn (2009–2013).

Ensminger played in 485 games in his 14-year Bundesliga career, tallying a total of 5,438 points and 4,093 rebounds. He appeared in seven Bundesliga All-Star Games, and earned the Eurobasket.com website's All-Bundesliga Center of the Year honors in 2003, 2005, 2009 and 2010.

== Coaching career ==
Ensminger moved into coaching immediately after his playing days were over, and he was named the head coach of the German 2nd Division ProA club Gotha Rockets, in May 2013. Under his tutelage, the Rockets reached the playoffs in three straight seasons, including berths in the semifinals in 2015 and 2016. Ensminger was relieved of his duties on January 31, 2017.

He took over the head coaching position for BBU Allgäu/Memmingen (later named Orange Academy) in Germany's top-tier youth league NBBL prior to the 2017–18 season. Ensminger also became Director of Development and Sports Performance at a player development company in Neu-Ulm, Germany.

== Personal life ==
His son Zachary is a German-American basketball player.
