= Aleksandar Nađfeji =

German basketball coach and former player

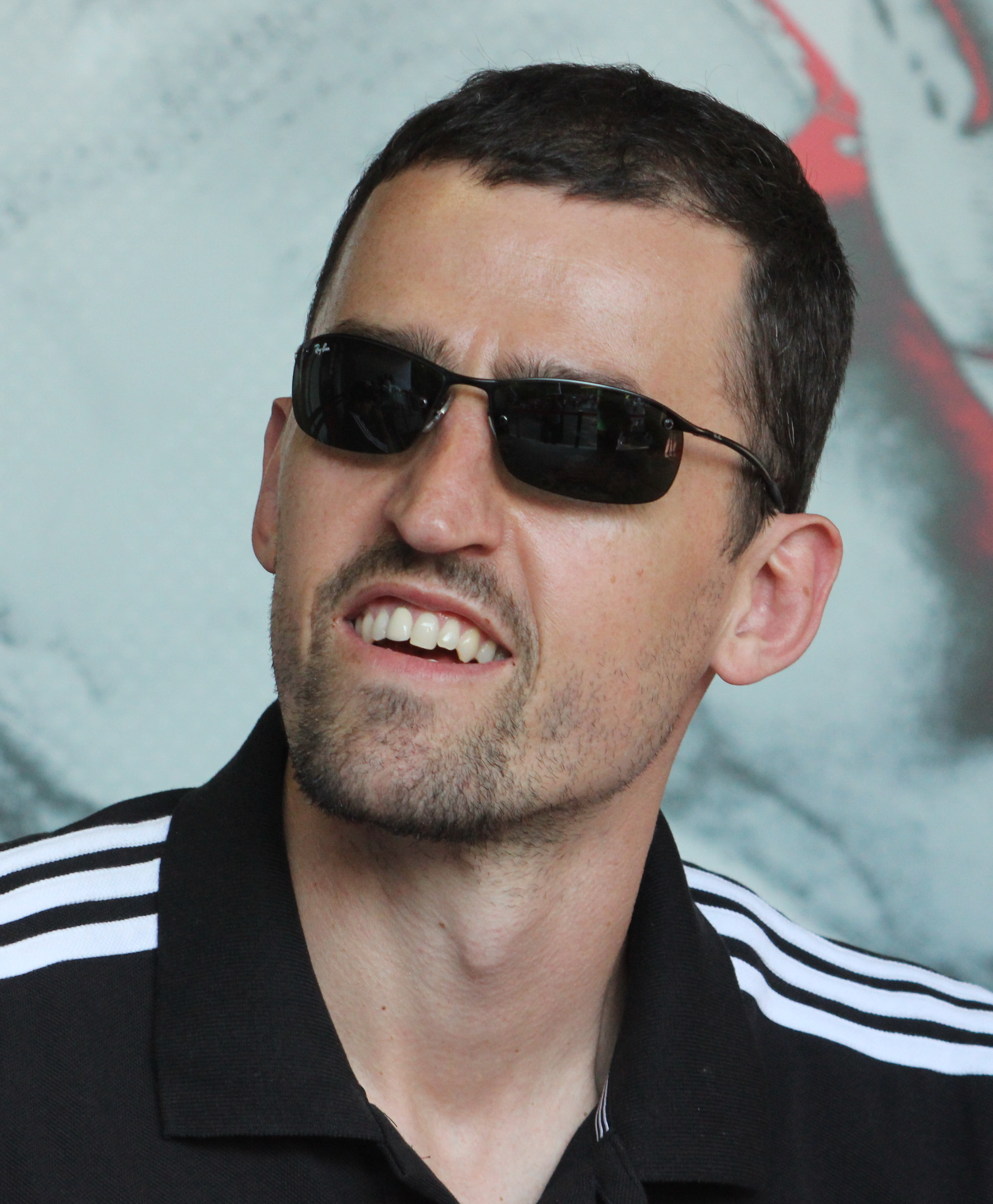
- Nađfeji in 2012

PS Karlsruhe Lions
- Title: Assistant coach
- League: ProA

Personal information
- Born: October 27, 1976 (age 50) Belgrade, Serbia, SFR Yugoslavia
- Listed height: 2.03 m (6 ft 8 in)
- Listed weight: 104 kg (229 lb)

Career information
- NBA draft: 1998: undrafted
- Playing career: 1996–2016
- Position: Power forward

Career history

Playing
- 1996–2001: Radnički Belgrade
- 2001–2005: Telekom Bonn
- 2005–2008: Köln 99ers
- 2008–2009: Alba Berlin
- 2009–2010: Tigers Tübingen
- 2010–2013: Bayern Munich
- 2013–2016: Tigers Tübingen

Coaching
- 2013–2018: Tigers Tübingen (assistant)
- 2018–2019: Tigers Tübingen
- 2023–present: PS Karlsruhe Lions (assistant)

Career highlights
- As player: 2x BBL champion (2006, 2009); 2x BBL-Pokal champion (2007, 2009); 4x BBL All-Star (2002–2004, 2008); ProA champion (2011); 2x YUBA League All-Star (1999, 2001); As coach: ProA champion 2024
Medals
Men's basketball
Representing FR Yugoslavia
Under-22 World Championship
Bronze medal – third place	1997 Australia	Team

Aleksandar Nađfeji (Serbian: Александар Нађфеји; born October 27, 1976) is a German basketball coach and former player of Serbian descent. Standing at 2.03 m (6 ft 8 in), Nađfeji mainly played as power forward in his career. Originally from Serbia, Nađfeji spent the majority of his playing and coaching career in Germany and later gave up his Serbian citizenship to retain only German nationality. He is best known for his long-standing career in the Basketball Bundesliga (BBL).

== Early life and career ==
Nađfeji was born in Belgrade, then part of the Socialist Federal Republic of Yugoslavia. He began playing basketball with KK Radnički Belgrade, a club known for its player development program.

== Professional playing career ==
Nađfeji moved to Germany in 2001 and began playing in the Basketball Bundesliga for Telekom Baskets Bonn. He quickly established himself as a versatile and reliable power forward. While with Alba Berlin, he competed in the Euroleague and contributed to the team's domestic success.

He retired from professional play in 2016.

== Coaching career ==
Following his retirement, Nađfeji joined the coaching staff at Tigers Tübingen. He served as an assistant coach before being promoted to head coach in 2017. His coaching emphasized the development of young talent and team rebuilding after relegation.

== Personal life ==
Nađfeji was born in Serbia but later renounced his Serbian citizenship, becoming a German citizen exclusively.

His younger brother, Stevan Nađfeji, played professionally as does his son Nemanja.

== Legacy ==
Nađfeji is regarded as one of the most influential foreign-born players in German basketball history, both for his longevity and his smooth transition to a successful coaching career. His contributions have had a lasting impact on German basketball development and international integration in the BBL.
