= Vladimir Petrović-Stergiou =

Serbian-Greek basketball coach

Aris Nikaias

Personal information
- Born: January 27, 1977 (age 49) Belgrade, SFR Yugoslavia
- Listed height: 6 ft 6.5 in (1.99 m)
- Listed weight: 215 lb (98 kg)

Career information
- NBA draft: 1999: undrafted
- Playing career: 1994–present
- Position: Shooting guard / small forward

Career history
- 1994–1997: Partizan
- 1997–1998: Borac Čačak
- 1998–1999: Zorka Šabac
- 1999–2001: Aris
- 2001–2002: KAOD
- 2002–2003: Cáceres
- 2003–2004: Alba Berlin
- 2004–2005: Breogán
- 2005: Montepaschi Siena
- 2005–2006: Aris
- 2006–2007: Paris Racing Basket
- 2007: Virtus Bologna
- 2007: Mega
- 2007–2008: Anwil Wloclawek
- 2008–2009: Panellinios
- 2009–2011: Iraklis
- 2011–2014: Apollon Patras
- 2014–2016: Promitheas Patras
- 2017–2019: HANTH
- 2020–present: Aris Nikaias

Career highlights
- 3× Yugoslav League champion (1995–1997); Yugoslav Cup winner (1995); German League champion (2003); German Cup winner (2003); German League All-Star (2004); 2× Greek League All-Star (2001, 2013)

Vladimir "Vlado" Petrović-Stergiou (Serbian Cyrillic: Владимир "Владо" Петровић-Стергиоу, Greek: Βλάντιμιρ "Βλάντο" Πέτροβιτς–Στεργίου; born January 27, 1977) is a Serbian-Greek former professional basketball player. At 6 ft 6 1/2 in (1.99 m) tall, he played at the shooting guard and small forward positions. He is also known as Vlantimir Stergiou, which is his Greek-form name.

== Professional career ==
Petrović-Stergiou began his career with Partizan Belgrade during the 1994–95 season. He moved to Borac Čačak in 1997. He then moved to Zorka Šabac for the 1998–99 season. He then joined Aris Thessaloniki in 1999, before moving to KAO Dramas in 2001. He moved on to Cáceres in 2002, before next joining Alba Berlin in 2003.

Petrović-Stergiou next played with Breogán, whom he joined in 2004. His next playing stop was with Montepaschi Siena, whom he moved to in 2005. He then returned to play with Aris, and then next joined Paris Racing Basket. He then played with Virtus Bologna, and then with Mega. After that, his next club was Anwil Wloclawek.

Petrović-Stergiou joined Panellinios in 2008, and then moved to Iraklis in 2009. He then joined Apollon Patras, before finishing his career with Promitheas Patras.

After one season break from professional basketball, Petrović-Stergiou signed for G.N.O. Aris Nikaias in September 2020.

== Awards and accomplishments ==
- Yugoslav Cup Winner: (1995)
- 3× Yugoslav League Champion: (1995, 1996, 1997)
- 2× Greek League All-Star: (2001, 2013)
- German Cup Winner: (2003)
- German League Champion: (2003)
- German League All-Star: (2004)
