= John Bryant (basketball) =

American basketball player (born 1987)

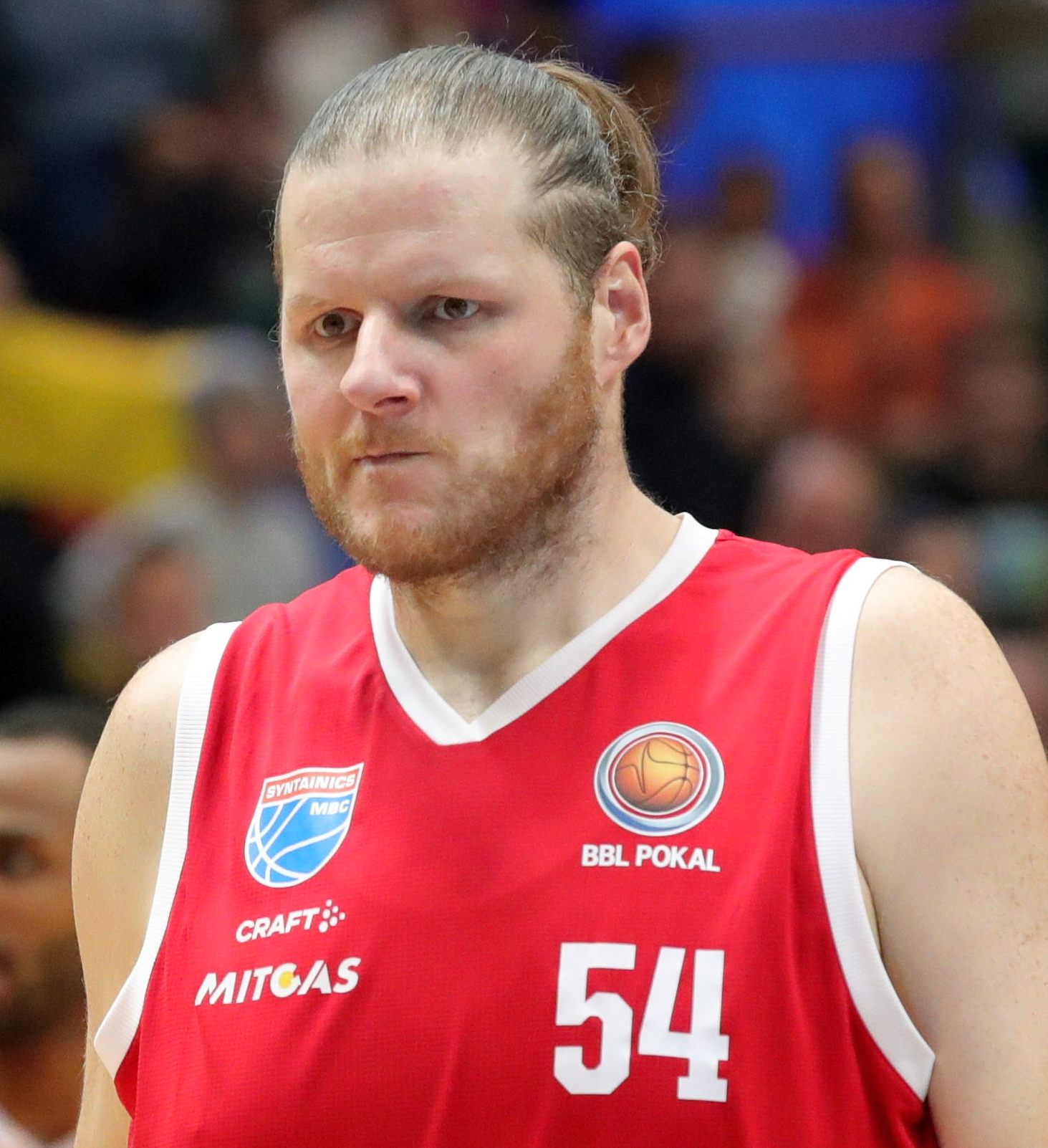
- Bryant with Mitteldeutscher BC in 2023

SBB Baskets
- Position: Center

Personal information
- Born: June 13, 1987 (age 39) Berkeley, California, U.S.
- Listed height: 6 ft 11 in (2.11 m)
- Listed weight: 280 lb (127 kg)

Career information
- High school: Pinole Valley (Pinole, California)
- College: Santa Clara (2005–2009)
- NBA draft: 2009: undrafted
- Playing career: 2009–present

Career history
- 2009–2010: Erie BayHawks
- 2010–2013: ratiopharm Ulm
- 2013–2016: Bayern Munich
- 2016: Valencia Basket
- 2016–2017: AS Monaco
- 2017–2020: Gießen 46ers
- 2020–2021: Paderborn Baskets
- 2021–2022: Gießen 46ers
- 2022–2026: Mitteldeutscher BC
- 2026: Eisbären Bremerhaven
- 2026–present: SBB Baskets

Career highlights
- German Cup Winner (2025); Leaders Cup winner (2017); Bundesliga champion (2014); 2× Bundesliga MVP (2012, 2013); 5× All-Bundesliga First Team (2011–2013, 2015, 2018); 4× German All-Star (2012–2015); Bundesliga Most Effective Player (2018); All-EuroCup First Team (2013); 2× German All-Star MVP (2012, 2013); Bundesliga Best Offensive Player (2013); WCC Player of the Year (2009); AP Honorable mention All-American (2009); 2× First-team All-WCC (2008, 2009); WCC All-Freshman Team (2006)

John Henry Bryant III (born June 13, 1987) is an American professional basketball player who plays for SBB Baskets of the ProA. Bryant was the 2009 West Coast Conference player of the year and an All-American as a senior at Santa Clara University.

== College career ==
Bryant, a 6'11" center from Pinole Valley High School in Pinole, California, played for the Santa Clara Broncos from 2005 to 2009. Bryant earned the Broncos starting center spot during his freshman year – averaging 6.6 points and 6.2 rebounds per game and earning a spot on the West Coast Conference (WCC) all-freshman team. He followed this up with a solid sophomore campaign, raising his averages to 10.4 points and 6.7 rebounds per game.

Bryant raised his game considerably as a junior. Bryant averaged 18 points per game and led the WCC in rebounding (9.6) and blocked shots (2.3). Bryant garnered first team All-WCC honors for the season.

Bryant showed a new dedication to conditioning the offseason before his senior campaign, but his hard work was nearly derailed as he was the victim of a stabbing attack just prior to the start of the 2008–09 season. However, he made a full recovery and had an outstanding senior year. Bryant led the nation in double-doubles and finished a close second to national player of the year Blake Griffin in rebounding nationally (14.2 to Griffin's 14.4). He was again named All-WCC, was the 2009 conference player of the year, and was named an honorable mention All-American by the Associated Press.

== Professional career ==
Following the close of his college career, Bryant was not selected in the 2009 NBA draft. He played his first professional season with the Erie BayHawks of the NBA Development League (NBDL), where he averaged 13.4 points, 9.5 rebounds and 1.5 blocks in 49 games.

The next season, Bryant moved to Germany, signing with ratiopharm Ulm of the Basketball Bundesliga. Bryant averaged 14.7 points and 10.9 rebounds in the 2010–11 season. He re-signed with Ulm for the 2011–12 season, and was subsequently named the Most Valuable Player of that season. He was named to the All-EuroCup First Team in 2013.

In July 2013, Bryant signed a two-year contract with Bayern Munich. In his first season with the Bavarians he helped the club reach the Top 16 of the EuroLeague and win the German championship.

On July 15, 2015, he signed a two-year extension with Bayern. On August 9, 2016, he parted ways with Bayern, and signed a one-year deal with Spanish club Valencia Basket.

After only playing two league games with Valencia, the club rescinded his contract due to his poor performance.

On November 23, 2016, he signed a two-month deal with French club AS Monaco Basket. He moved back to Germany for the 2017–18 season, signing with Basketball Bundesliga side Gießen 46ers. After averaging 18.2 points and 10.7 rebounds per game in his first season, Bryant signed a two-year extension with the team on May 17, 2018. Bryant left Gießen at the end of the 2019–20 season. During his three years at the team, he averaged 18.2 points and 10.7 rebounds per contest in Bundesliga play.

On November 8, 2020, Bryant signed with Paderborn Baskets of the ProA.

On January 11, 2021, he has signed and return to Gießen 46ers of the Basketball Bundesliga.

On January 13, 2022, he has signed with Mitteldeutscher BC of the German Basketball Bundesliga.

== Career statistics ==
Legend
| GP | Games played | GS | Games started | MPG | Minutes per game |
| FG% | Field-goal percentage | 3P% | 3-point field-goal percentage | FT% | Free-throw percentage |
| RPG | Rebounds per game | APG | Assists per game | SPG | Steals per game |
| BPG | Blocks per game | PPG | Points per game | PIR | Performance index rating |
| **Bold** | Career high |

=== EuroLeague ===
| Year | Team | GP | GS | MPG | FG% | 3P% | FT% | RPG | APG | SPG | BPG | PPG | PIR |
|---|---|---|---|---|---|---|---|---|---|---|---|---|---|
| 2013–14 | Bayern | **24** | **22** | 20.5 | .439 | .200 | .667 | 6.5 | 1.2 | .4 | .4 | 7.8 | 8.9 |
| 2014–15 | Bayern | 10 | 8 | **22.2** | .455 | .273 | **.767** | **7.7** | **1.5** | .4 | **.6** | **10.8** | **12.1** |
| 2015–16 | Bayern | 10 | 3 | 18.7 | **.569** | **.667** | .692 | 3.9 | .9 | **1.1** | **.6** | 8.9 | 10.1 |
| **Career** | | 44 | 33 | 20.5 | .469 | .311 | .713 | 6.2 | 1.2 | .6 | .5 | 8.8 | 9.9 |
