= Jarvis Walker =

Australian fishing equipment manufacturer

- Industry: Retail
- Founded: 1946; 80 years ago in Balwyn, Victoria, Australia
- Headquarters: Balwyn, Victoria, Australia
- Website: Official website

Jarvis Walker is an Australian manufacturer of fishing tackle, primarily known for fishing reels and rods. It was founded in 1946 in Deepdene, Victoria by Jim Jarvis Walker. It was one of the earliest Australian manufacturers of fibreglass rods. Jarvis Walker is also known for its brands Jarvis Marine, Watersnake, and Rovex.

== History ==
Jarvis Walker was founded in Melbourne in 1946 by Jim "Jarvis" Walker during a period of growing demand for locally produced fishing tackle in Australia following the shortages of imported goods after the Second World War. The company initially specialised in split cane fishing rods, but international shortages of bamboo during the post-war years and the Korean War encouraged Australian manufacturers to experiment with alternative materials, including fiberglass.

By the early 1960s Jarvis Walker had begun producing solid fiberglass rods, which were marketed as durable modern alternatives to traditional cane designs. The company later expanded into tubular fiberglass rod production, introducing Australian-made tubular glass models around 1980. These developments reflected broader technological changes within the fishing tackle industry, as fiberglass gradually replaced handcrafted cane rods in recreational fishing because of its lower cost, strength and ease of mass production.

== See also ==
- List of sporting goods manufacturers
- List of companies named after people
