= Philipp Schwethelm =

German basketball player (born 1989)

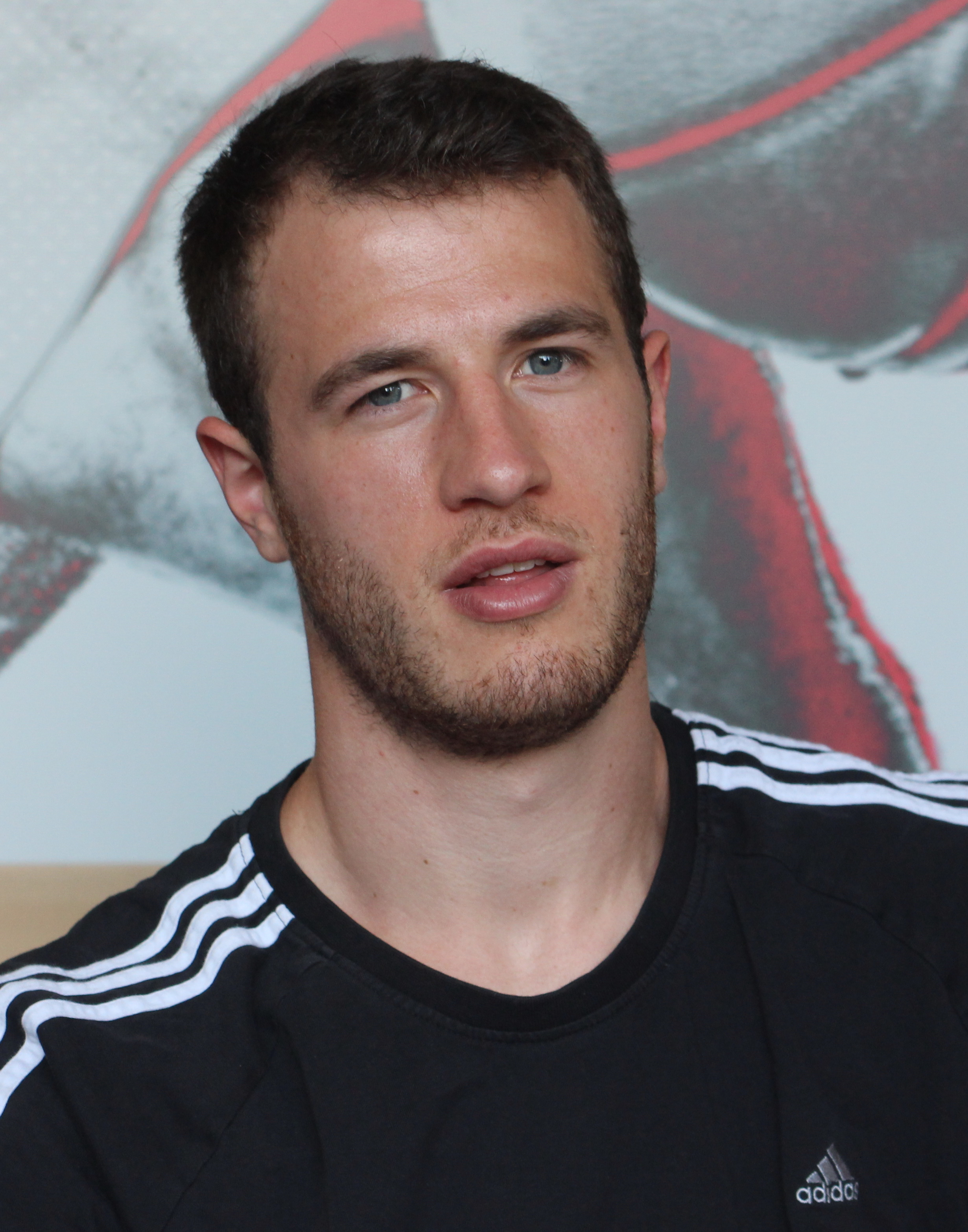
- Schwethelm with Bayern Munich

Personal information
- Born: 1 May 1989 (age 37) Engelskirchen, West Germany
- Listed height: 6 ft 7 in (2.01 m)
- Listed weight: 208 lb (94 kg)

Career information
- NBA draft: 2011: undrafted
- Playing career: 2005–2021
- Position: Small forward

Career history
- 2005–2009: Köln 99ers
- 2009–2011: Eisbären Bremerhaven
- 2011–2013: Bayern Munich
- 2012–2013: →ratiopharm Ulm
- 2013–2015: ratiopharm Ulm
- 2015–2021: EWE Baskets Oldenburg

Career highlights
- BBL Rookie of the Year (2008); BBL champion (2006); German Cup winner (2007); 5× BBL All-Star (2011–2013, 2015, 2017); BBL All-Star Game MVP (2017)

Philipp Schwethelm (born 1 May 1989) is a retired German professional basketball player. He competed with the German national basketball team at the 2010 FIBA World Championship.

== Professional career ==
Schwethelm began his professional career in 2005 with German side Köln 99ers (then called RheinEnergie Köln). He played sparingly for two seasons before seeing significant action starting with the 2007–08 season. While with the 99ers, he participated in EuroCup 2005–06, 2006–07 Euroleague, and ULEB Cup 2007–08.

In 2009, the 99ers declared bankruptcy. Schwethelm was then linked to a two-year deal with fellow Bundesliga side Eisbären Bremerhaven. In the 2009–10 season, he averaged a career-high seven points per game in helping the team to the league semifinals.

In June 2015, he parted ways with ratiopharm Ulm. Later that month, he signed with EWE Baskets Oldenburg.

On 27 May 2021 he announced his retirement from professional basketball.

== International career ==
Schwethelm was one of the top junior players in Germany. He first played with the German national basketball team at the 2004 FIBA Europe Under-16 Championship. He later competed with the junior squads at both the 2008 and 2009 FIBA Europe Under-20 Championship.

Schwethelm's first major tournament as a member of the German senior national team was the 2010 FIBA World Championship in Turkey.
