= Bremerhaven Stadthalle =

Multi-purpose event hall in Bremerhaven, Germany

Coordinates: 53°33′17″N 8°35′2″E

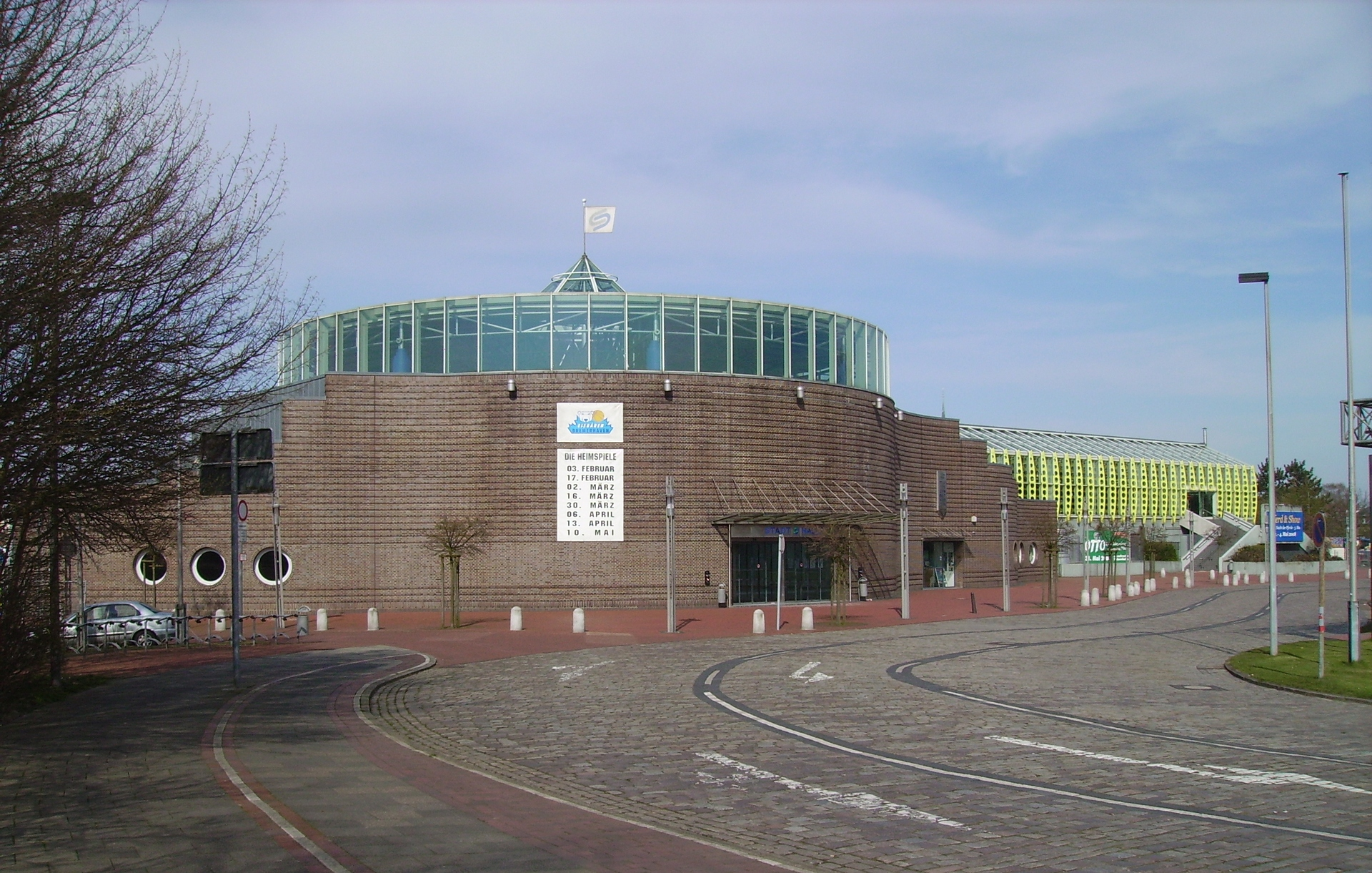
- Interactive map of Bremerhaven Stadthalle
- Location: Bremerhaven, Germany
- Capacity: 6,000

Construction
- Opened: 1974

Tenants
- Eisbären Bremerhaven; Fischtown Pinguins Bremerhaven

Bremerhaven Stadthalle is an arena in Bremerhaven, Germany. It is primarily used for Events. Bremerhaven Stadthalle opened in 1974 and holds 6,000 people without seating.

This is the home arena of the Eisbären Bremerhaven.
