= 2017 BBL Playoffs =

German basketball postseason

Tournament details
- Country: Germany
- Dates: 5 May–18 June 2017
- Teams: 8
- Defending champions: Brose Bamberg

Final positions
- Champions: Brose Bamberg
- Runners-up: EWE Baskets Oldenburg

The 2017 BBL Playoffs was the concluding postseason of the 2016–17 Basketball Bundesliga season. The Playoffs started on 5 May and ended on 11 June 2017.

== Playoff qualifying ==
Pos	Team	Pld	W	L	PF	PA	PD	Pts	Seeding
1	ratiopharm Ulm	32	30	2	2819	2433	+386	60	Seeded teams
2	Brose Bamberg	32	29	3	2677	2209	+468	58	Seeded teams
3	Bayern Munich	32	28	4	2767	2223	+544	56	Seeded teams
4	Medi bayreuth	32	22	10	2676	2530	+146	44	Seeded teams
5	EWE Baskets Oldenburg	32	18	14	2573	2479	+94	36 (Note: Oldenburg 6 Pts; Berlin 4 Pts; Bonn 2 Pts)	Unseeded teams
6	Alba Berlin	32	18	14	2610	2599	+11	36	Unseeded teams
7	Telekom Baskets Bonn	32	18	14	2641	2629	+12	36	Unseeded teams
8	MHP Riesen Ludwigsburg	32	17	15	2482	2447	+35	34	Unseeded teams

Source: BBL
Rules for classification: 1) points; 2) Head-to-head; 3) Points difference; 4) Points scored.

== Bracket ==
Quarterfinals
1	ratiopharm Ulm	3
8	MHP Riesen Ludwigsburg	2
4	Medi Bayreuth	1
5	EWE Baskets Oldenburg	3
3	Bayern Munich	3
6	ALBA Berlin	1
2	Brose Bamberg	3
7	Telekom Baskets Bonn	1

Semifinals
1	ratiopharm Ulm	2
5	EWE Baskets Oldenburg	3
3	Bayern Munich	0
2	Brose Bamberg	3

Finals
5	EWE Baskets Oldenburg	0
2	Brose Bamberg	3

== Quarterfinals ==
The quarterfinals were played in a best of five format from 5 to 18 May 2017.

=== ratiopharm Ulm vs MHP Riesen Ludwigsburg ===
6 May
16:45

Boxscore

ratiopharm Ulm 93, MHP Riesen Ludwigsburg 96 (OT)
Scoring by quarter: 22–19, 16–20, 18–26, 27–18, Overtime: 10–13
Pts: Raymar Morgan 21; Rebs: Augustine Rubit 11; Asts: Braydon Hobbs 6	Pts: Roderick Trice 25; Rebs: Jack Cooley 10; Asts: Hammonds, Trice 4
Ludwigsburg leads series 1–0

Arena Ulm/Neu-Ulm, Ulm
Attendance: 6,200
Referees: Benjamin Barth, Moritz Reiter, Johannes Hack

10 May
20:30

Boxscore

MHP Riesen Ludwigsburg 76, ratiopharm Ulm 82
Scoring by quarter: 21–20, 19–20, 14–22, 22–20
Pts: Kennedy, Hammonds 14; Rebs: Trice 7 Asts: Kennedy, Hammonds 4	Pts: Chris Babb 21; Rebs: Raymar Morgan 9 Asts: Braydon Hobbs 7
Series tied, 1–1

Arena Ludwigsburg, Ludwigsburg
Attendance: 4,500
Referees: Robert Lottermoser, Clemens Fritz, Konstantin Simonow

13 May
18:00

Boxscore

ratiopharm Ulm 87, MHP Riesen Ludwigsburg 76
Scoring by quarter: 20–10, 23–29, 19–15, 25–12
Pts: Per Günther 21; Rebs: Chris Babb 6 Asts: Braydon Hobbs 6	Pts: Jack Cooley 24; Rebs: D. J. Kennedy 13; Asts: D. J. Kennedy 7
Ulm leads series 2–1

Arena Ulm/Neu-Ulm, Ulm
Attendance: 6,200
Referees: Anne Panther, Toni Rodriguez, Oliver Krause

16 May
20:30

Boxscore

MHP Riesen Ludwigsburg 84, ratiopharm Ulm 76
Scoring by quarter: 19–18, 15–17, 20–15, 30–26
Pts: Jack Cooley 23; Rebs: Kennedy, Trice 10; Asts: Cliff Hammonds 7	Pts: Raymar Morgan 18; Rebs: Augustine Rubit 9 Asts: Braydon Hobbs 6
Series tied, 2–2

Arena Ludwigsburg, Ludwigsburg
Attendance: 4,500
Referees: Martin Matip, Clemens Fritz, Christof Madinger

18 May
19:00

Boxscore

ratiopharm Ulm 91, MHP Riesen Ludwigsburg 81
Scoring by quarter: 24–20, 31–19, 27–27, 9–15
Pts: Augustine Rubit 23; Rebs: Chris Babb 9 Asts: Hobbs, Rubit 5	Pts: Cooley, Hammonds 14; Rebs: Jack Cooley 6 Asts: Cliff Hammonds 6
Ulm wins series 3–2

Arena Ulm/Neu-Ulm, Ulm
Attendance: 6,200
Referees: Benjamin Barth, Martin Matip, Christof Madinger

=== Brose Bamberg vs Telekom Baskets Bonn ===
6 May
15:00

Boxscore

Brose Bamberg 92, Telekom Baskets Bonn 93
Scoring by quarter: 22–25, 24–22, 26–26, 20–20
Pts: Nicolò Melli 21; Rebs: Nicolò Melli 9 Asts: Jānis Strēlnieks 5	Pts: Josh Mayo 25; Rebs: Kenneth Horton 12; Asts: Josh Mayo 10
Bonn leads series 1–0

Brose Arena, Bamberg
Attendance: 6,150
Referees: Robert Lottermoser, Steffen Neubecker, Enrico Streit

10 May
20:30

Boxscore

Telekom Baskets Bonn 71, Brose Bamberg 87
Scoring by quarter: 19–25, 16–30, 14–17, 22–15
Pts: Ryan Thompson 13; Rebs: Yorman Polas Bartolo 5 Asts: Bartolo, Mayo 4	Pts: Staiger, Theis 15; Rebs: Causeur 9 Asts: Nikos Zisis 5
Series tied, 1–1

Telekom Dome, Bonn
Attendance: 5,610
Referees: Martin Matip, Benjamin Barth, Nesa Kovačević

14 May
15:00

Boxscore

Brose Bamberg 76, Telekom Baskets Bonn 63
Scoring by quarter: 18–17, 18–12, 12–23, 28–11
Pts: Nikos Zisis 15; Rebs: Leon Radošević 8 Asts: Nikos Zisis 5	Pts: Gamble, Thompson 15; Rebs: Kenneth Horton 12; Asts: T. J. DiLeo 5
Bamberg leads series 2–1

Brose Arena, Bamberg
Attendance: 6,150
Referees: Christof Madinger, Konstantin Simonow, Steve Bittner

16 May
20:30

Boxscore

Telekom Baskets Bonn 67, Brose Bamberg 76
Scoring by quarter: 17–17, 20–21, 13–16, 17–22
Pts: Julian Gamble 18; Rebs: Kenneth Horton 8 Asts: Ryan Thompson 6	Pts: Melli, Zisis 15; Rebs: Daniel Theis 8 Asts: Darius Miller 5
Bamberg wins series 3–1

Telekom Dome, Bonn
Attendance: 5,070
Referees: Anne Panther, Benjamin Barth, Moritz Reiter

=== Bayern Munich vs Alba Berlin ===
6 May
20:30

Boxscore

Bayern Munich 95, Alba Berlin 68
Scoring by quarter: 22–17, 31–8, 20–20, 22–23
Pts: Reggie Redding 17; Rebs: King, Kleber 5 Asts: Dru Joyce 8	Pts: Akpınar, Kikanović 11; Rebs: Tony Gaffney 9 Asts: Gaffney, Miller 3
Munich leads series 1–0

Audi Dome, Munich
Attendance: 6,309
Referees: Anne Panther, Oliver Krause, Steve Bittner

11 May
20:30

Boxscore

Alba Berlin 83, Bayern Munich 76
Scoring by quarter: 23–25, 18–25, 21–8, 21–18
Pts: Niels Giffey 15; Rebs: Tony Gaffney 7 Asts: three players 3	Pts: Devin Booker 13; Rebs: Taylor, Zirbes 6 Asts: Anton Gavel 5
Series tied, 1–1

Mercedes-Benz Arena, Berlin
Attendance: 11,666
Referees: Moritz Reiter, Johannes Hack, Steffen Neubecker

13 May
20:30

Boxscore

Bayern Munich 80, Alba Berlin 73
Scoring by quarter: 22–16, 15–18, 21–27, 22–12
Pts: Vladimir Lučić 14; Rebs: Maxi Kleber 7 Asts: Reggie Redding 3	Pts: Elmedin Kikanović 12; Rebs: Tony Gaffney 6 Asts: Gerald Robinson 5
Munich leads series 2–1

Audi Dome, Munich
Attendance: 6,553
Referees: Robert Lottermoser, Carsten Straube, Enrico Streit

16 May
20:30

Boxscore

Alba Berlin 82, Bayern Munich 87
Scoring by quarter: 22–21, 21–22, 21–18, 18–26
Pts: Gaffney, Robinson 14; Rebs: Tony Gaffney 7 Asts: Gerald Robinson 6	Pts: Đedović, Lučić 19; Rebs: Maxi Kleber 7 Asts: Anton Gavel 5
Munich wins series 3–1

Mercedes-Benz Arena, Berlin
Attendance: 9,099
Referees: Toni Rodriguez, Nesa Kovačević, Steve Bittner

=== Medi bayreuth vs EWE Baskets Oldenburg ===
5 May
18:00

Boxscore

Medi bayreuth 83, EWE Baskets Oldenburg 85
Scoring by quarter: 22–17, 26–23, 19–25, 16–20
Pts: Assem Marei 20; Rebs: Assem Marei 12; Asts: Nate Linhart 6	Pts: Maxime De Zeeuw 19; Rebs: Kramer, Qvale 6 Asts: Frantz Massenat 6
Oldenburg leads series 1–0

Oberfrankenhalle, Bayreuth
Attendance: 3,300
Referees: Martin Matip, Clemens Fritz, Christof Madinger

9 May
18:30

Boxscore

EWE Baskets Oldenburg 102, Medi bayreuth 90
Scoring by quarter: 23–23, 26–20, 28–19, 25–28
Pts: Frantz Massenat 22; Rebs: Brian Qvale 9 Asts: Chris Kramer 12	Pts: Trey Lewis 25; Rebs: Assem Marei 7 Asts: Nate Linhart 4
Oldenburg leads series 2–0

Große EWE Arena, Oldenburg
Attendance: 6,000
Referees: Toni Rodriguez, Anne Panther, Carsten Straube

14 May
15:00

Boxscore

Medi bayreuth 98, EWE Baskets Oldenburg 94
Scoring by quarter: 25–18, 26–19, 25–22, 22–35
Pts: De'Mon Brooks 24; Rebs: Nate Linhart 9 Asts: Kyan Anderson 5	Pts: Frantz Massenat 28; Rebs: Brian Qvale 11; Asts: Chris Kramer 5
Oldenburg leads series 2–1

Oberfrankenhalle, Bayreuth
Attendance: 3,300
Referees: Martin Matip, Moritz Reiter, Nesa Kovačević

16 May
19:00

Boxscore

EWE Baskets Oldenburg 94, Medi bayreuth 86
Scoring by quarter: 28–22, 19–24, 19–19, 28–21
Pts: De Zeeuw, Paulding 18; Rebs: Chris Kramer 12; Asts: Kramer, Paulding 6	Pts: Nate Linhart 19; Rebs: Nate Linhart 9 Asts: Nate Linhart 6
Oldenburg wins series 3–1

Große EWE Arena, Oldenburg
Attendance: 6,000
Referees: Robert Lottermoser, Oliver Krause, Konstantin Simonow

== Semifinals ==
The semifinals were played in a best of five format from 20 May to 1 June 2017.

=== ratiopharm Ulm vs EWE Baskets Oldenburg ===
21 May
15:00

Boxscore

ratiopharm Ulm 86, EWE Baskets Oldenburg 79
Scoring by quarter: 26–29, 19–13, 24–23, 17–14
Pts: Chris Babb 26; Rebs: Taylor Braun 9 Asts: Braydon Hobbs 6	Pts: Rickey Paulding 24; Rebs: Brian Qvale 9 Asts: Chris Kramer 7
Ulm leads series 1–0

Arena Ulm/Neu-Ulm, Ulm
Attendance: 6,200
Referees: Anne Panther, Oliver Krause, Carsten Straube

23 May
20:30

Boxscore

EWE Baskets Oldenburg 107, ratiopharm Ulm 103 (OT)
Scoring by quarter: 21–27, 12–33, 34–18, 26–15, Overtime: 14–10
Pts: Rickey Paulding 28; Rebs: De Zeeuw, Kramer 7 Asts: Chris Kramer 8	Pts: Raymar Morgan 27; Rebs: Augustine Rubit 11; Asts: Braydon Hobbs 8
Series tied, 1–1

Große EWE Arena, Oldenburg
Attendance: 6,000
Referees: Toni Rodriguez, Nesa Kovačević, Johannes Hack

27 May
17:00

Boxscore

ratiopharm Ulm 61, EWE Baskets Oldenburg 68
Scoring by quarter: 10–17, 19–18, 14–13, 18–20
Pts: Augustine Rubit 15; Rebs: Raymar Morgan 10; Asts: Braydon Hobbs 5	Pts: Rickey Paulding 19; Rebs: Brian Qvale 9 Asts: Chris Kramer 6
Oldenburg leads series 2–1

Arena Ulm/Neu-Ulm, Ulm
Attendance: 6,200
Referees: Robert Lottermoser, Moritz Reiter, Steve Bittner

30 May
19:00

Boxscore

EWE Baskets Oldenburg 61, ratiopharm Ulm 74
Scoring by quarter: 9–20, 22–22, 16–13, 14–19
Pts: Rickey Paulding 12; Rebs: Brian Qvale 7 Asts: three players 4	Pts: Raymar Morgan 18; Rebs: Morgan, Rubit 6 Asts: Günther, Rubit 4
Series tied, 2–2

Große EWE Arena, Oldenburg
Attendance: 6,000
Referees: Robert Lottermoser, Anne Panther, Clemens Fritz

1 June
19:00

Boxscore

ratiopharm Ulm 75, EWE Baskets Oldenburg 78
Scoring by quarter: 13–20, 18–20, 22–20, 22–18
Oldenburg wins series 3–2

Arena Ulm/Neu-Ulm, Ulm
Referees: Robert Lottermoser, Moritz Reiter, Nesa Kovačević

=== Brose Bamberg vs Bayern Munich ===
21 May
15:00

Boxscore

Brose Bamberg 82, Bayern Munich 59
Scoring by quarter: 23–10, 22–13, 19–14, 18–22
Pts: Fabien Causeur 16; Rebs: Leon Radošević 7 Asts: Nikos Zisis 4	Pts: Devin Booker 15; Rebs: Maxi Kleber 11; Asts: four players 2
Bamberg leads series 1–0

Brose Arena, Bamberg
Attendance: 6,150
Referees: Toni Rodriguez, Clemens Fritz, Nesa Kovačević

25 May
17:30

Boxscore

Bayern Munich 76, Brose Bamberg 80
Scoring by quarter: 30–20, 9–21, 23–16, 14–23
Pts: Devin Booker 12; Rebs: Barthel, Đedović 5 Asts: Dru Joyce 4	Pts: Fabien Causeur 23; Rebs: Fabien Causeur 6 Asts: Nikos Zisis 6
Bamberg leads series 2–0

Audi Dome, Munich
Attendance: 6,700
Referees: Robert Lottermoser, Moritz Reiter, Oliver Krause

28 May
17:00

Boxscore

Brose Bamberg 76, Bayern Munich 67
Scoring by quarter: 17–17, 23–28, 14–11, 22–11
Pts: Fabien Causeur 17; Rebs: Causeur, Melli 7 Asts: Melli, Zisis 4	Pts: Vladimir Lučić 19; Rebs: Devin Booker 6 Asts: Reggie Redding 5
Bamberg wins series 3–0

Brose Arena, Bamberg
Attendance: 6,150
Referees: Anne Panther, Clemens Fritz, Konstantin Simonow

== Final ==
The final was played in a best of five format from 4 to 11 June 2017.

4 June
15:00

Boxscore

Brose Bamberg 96, EWE Baskets Oldenburg 60
Scoring by quarter: 24–6, 19–16, 26–21, 27–17
Pts: Maodo Lô 17; Rebs: Causeur, Melli 8 Asts: Miller, Zisis 4	Pts: Frantz Massenat 13; Rebs: Brian Qvale 8 Asts: Kramer, Massenat 4
Bamberg leads series 1–0

Brose Arena, Bamberg
Attendance: 6,150
Referees: Toni Rodriguez, Moritz Reiter, Steve Bittner

7 June
20:30

Boxscore

EWE Baskets Oldenburg 76, Brose Bamberg 88
Scoring by quarter: 16–24, 16–24, 21–22, 23–18
Pts: Brian Qvale 19; Rebs: Maxime De Zeeuw 13; Asts: Chris Kramer 8	Pts: Fabien Causeur 21; Rebs: Darius Miller 7 Asts: Nikos Zisis 6
Bamberg leads series 2–0

Große EWE Arena, Oldenburg
Attendance: 6,000
Referees: Robert Lottermoser, Carsten Straube, Clemens Fritz

11 June
17:15

Boxscore

Brose Bamberg 76, EWE Baskets Oldenburg 58
Scoring by quarter: 19–17, 20–17, 18–15, 19–9
Pts: Maodo Lô 15; Rebs: Daniel Theis 13; Asts: Miller, Zisis 3	Pts: Brian Qvale 12; Rebs: Rickey Paulding 6 Asts: Kramer, Massenat 4
Bamberg wins series 3–0

Brose Arena, Bamberg
Attendance: 6,150
Referees: Anne Panther, Nesa Kovačević, Oliver Krause
