= 2016–17 Basketball Bundesliga =

German basketball season

easyCredit BBL^{1}
- Season: 2016–17
- Duration: 23 September 2016–11 June 2017
- Games played: 272
- Teams: 18

Regular season
- Top seed: ratiopharm Ulm
- Season MVP: (United States) Raymar Morgan
- Relegated: Rasta Vechta; Phoenix Hagen

Finals
- Champions: Brose Bamberg (9th title)
- Runners-up: EWE Baskets Oldenburg
- Finals MVP: (France) Fabien Causeur

Statistical leaders
Points	(United States) Raymar Morgan	17.7
Rebounds	(Canada) Dyshawn Pierre	7.9
Assists	(United States) Jared Jordan	7.8

Records
- Average attendance: 4,574

Seasons
- ← 2015–16 2017–18 →
- ^{1} Sponsored name referring to easyCredit

The 2016–17 Basketball Bundesliga was the 51st season of the Basketball Bundesliga, the top-tier level of professional club basketball in Germany. The season started on 23 September 2016 and ended on 11 June 2017. The name of the league was changed to easyCredit BBL, after the league signed a sponsor deal until 2021 with easyCredit.

Brose Bamberg won their third straight and ninth overall title.

== Teams ==
Location of teams in 2016–17 Basketball Bundesliga

=== Promotion and relegation ===
Mitteldeutscher BC and Crailsheim Merlins were relegated from the BBL after the 2015–16 season, as they finished in the last two places. Science City Jena and Rasta Vechta were promoted from the 2015–16 ProA. Science City were the champions of the second division, Vechta the runners-up.

=== Arenas and locations ===
Team	City	Arena	Capacity
Brose Bamberg	Bamberg	Stechert Arena	6,150
Medi bayreuth	Bayreuth	Oberfrankenhalle	4,000
Alba Berlin	Berlin	Mercedes-Benz Arena	14,500
Telekom Baskets Bonn	Bonn	Telekom Dome	6,000
Basketball Löwen Braunschweig	Braunschweig	Volkswagen Halle	6,600
Eisbären Bremerhaven	Bremerhaven	Bremerhaven Stadthalle	4,050
Skyliners Frankfurt	Frankfurt	Fraport Arena	5,002
Gießen 46ers	Gießen	Sporthalle Gießen-Ost	4,003
BG Göttingen	Göttingen	Sparkassen Arena	3,447
Phoenix Hagen	Hagen	Enervie Arena	3,402
Science City Jena	Jena	Sparkassen-Arena	3,000
MHP Riesen Ludwigsburg	Ludwigsburg	MHP-Arena	5,300
Bayern Munich	Munich	Audi Dome	6,700
EWE Baskets Oldenburg	Oldenburg	Große EWE Arena	6,069
Tigers Tübingen	Tübingen	Paul Horn-Arena	3,132
ratiopharm ulm	Ulm	Ratiopharm Arena	6,000
Rasta Vechta	Vechta	RASTA Dome	3,140
s.Oliver Würzburg	Würzburg	s.Oliver Arena	3,140

== Regular season ==
=== Standings ===
Pos	Team	Pld	W	L	PF	PA	PD	Pts	Qualification or relegation
1	ratiopharm Ulm	32	30	2	2819	2433	+386	60	Qualification for playoffs
2	Brose Bamberg	32	29	3	2677	2209	+468	58	Qualification for playoffs
3	Bayern Munich	32	28	4	2767	2223	+544	56	Qualification for playoffs
4	Medi bayreuth	32	22	10	2676	2530	+146	44	Qualification for playoffs
5	EWE Baskets Oldenburg	32	18	14	2573	2479	+94	36 (Note: Oldenburg 6 Pts; Berlin 4 Pts; Bonn 2 Pts)	Qualification for playoffs
6	Alba Berlin	32	18	14	2610	2599	+11	36	Qualification for playoffs
7	Telekom Baskets Bonn	32	18	14	2641	2629	+12	36	Qualification for playoffs
8	MHP Riesen Ludwigsburg	32	17	15	2482	2447	+35	34	Qualification for playoffs
9	Gießen 46ers	32	15	17	2545	2507	+38	30	
10	Skyliners Frankfurt	32	14	18	2307	2377	−70	28 (Note: Frankfurt 2 Pts, +10 PD; Berlin 2 Pts, −10 PD)	
11	BG Göttingen	32	14	18	2479	2609	−130	28	
12	Eisbären Bremerhaven	32	12	20	2647	2816	−169	24	
13	Science City Jena	32	11	21	2415	2654	−239	22 (Note: Jena 2 Pts, +2 PD; Würzburg 2 Pts, −2 PD)	
14	s.Oliver Würzburg	32	11	21	2502	2636	−134	22	
15	Tigers Tübingen	32	7	25	2397	2635	−238	14	
16	Basketball Löwen Braunschweig	32	6	26	2398	2708	−310	12	
17	Rasta Vechta (R)	32	2	30	2351	2704	−353	4	Relegation to ProA
18	Phoenix Hagen (Note: In October 2016, Phoenix Hagen were punished with a deduction of four points for failing with licensing requirements. On 30 November 2016, the BBL withdrew the licence of the club and it was relegated to the ProA, while it also stopped playing and all results were expunged.) (D)	0	0	0	0	0	0	0	Relegation to ProA

Source: BBL
Rules for classification: 1) points; 2) Head-to-head; 3) Points difference; 4) Points scored.
(D) Disqualified; (R) Relegated

=== Results ===
Home \ Away	BAM	BAY	BER	BON	BRA	BRE	FRA	GIE	GÖT	JEN	LUD	MUN	OLD	TÜB	ULM	VEC	WÜR
Brose Bamberg		83–65	88–91	84–64	95–75	85–84	84–55	82–68	93–82	79–54	84–75	90–59	83–77	85–45	79–84	104–75	88–78
Medi bayreuth	88–92		98–96	83–78	96–48	95–83	99–98	89–79	84–76	92–84	87–70	74–72	80–71	82–81	87–95	96–71	83–71
Alba Berlin	80–89	77–76		96–89	84–76	97–71	70–78	85–84	91–87	73–74	86–76	56–80	81–63	89–72	94–98	83–74	99–75
Telekom Bonn	70–85	101–94	95–72		91–93	98–93	74–60	90–68	66–78	72–61	90–86	95–83	72–86	81–67	69–87	88–83	101–84
Löwen Braunschweig	48–96	82–63	82–92	92–84		77–61	74–75	74–84	75–77	86–97	84–91	58–80	76–83	70–98	76–100	87–73	66–67
Eisbären Bremerhaven	87–93	69–80	100–92	113–103	89–80		86–79	70–93	68–77	83–82	87–95	73–197	97–92	92–84	66–106	93–74	93–88
Fraport Skyliners	57–65	56–72	83–71	73–74	92–56	84–79		65–61	81–67	69–61	65–63	57–77	77–80	84–64	73–79	61–68	79–76
Gießen 46ers	77–79	82–100	71–80	85–102	80–62	88–84	69–52		79–72	86–76	62–68	68–72	78–61	76–83	75–79	82–74	77–74
Göttingen	70–71	66–101	81–76	83–92	114–107	76–66	82–76	74–84		76–82	84–75	63–94	63–83	92–76	63–94	85–65	79–67
Science City Jena	61–74	76–79	73–77	72–74	89–82	71–91	71–78	71–77	102–92		80–95	54–98	51–92	82–79	74–84	91–90	84–75
MHP Riesen Ludwigsburg	48–60	76–79	73–79	82–68	80–78	81–78	70–68	83–77	71–74	69–71		65–75	79–75	81–65	79–61	90–77	92–65
FC Bayern Munich	67–59	100–86	97–58	84–72	89–74	103–78	95–70	110–60	86–71	98–68	94–65		90–83	82–70	79–87	85–72	90–77
EWE Oldenburg	62–83	83–64	93–81	91–77	79–59	85–70	71–64	82–84	76–64	90–81	75–63	69–83		86–82	88–96	79–76	85–75
Tigers Tübingen	75–87	77–87	77–82	67–79	80–75	76–85	81–83	78–66	73–82	68–76	76–88	63–85	58–89		79–89	86–77	76–83
ratiopharm Ulm	78–63	90–70	82–76	93–70	77–65	96–83	91–84	72–63	89–65	114–83	97–80	68–83	105–95	87–72		75–70	98–75
Rasta Vechta	68–96	65–74	69–80	70–77	59–72	84–90	63–65	83–87	77–78	72–80	74–92	57–101	89–76	76–82	85–95		76–88
s.Oliver Würzburg	62–88	82–73	77–86	81–85	93–89	92–85	73–64	81–86	87–86	90–83	72–81	63–68	98–73	77–87	70–73	86–63	

Legend: Blue = home team win; Red = away team win.

== Playoffs ==
The playoffs started on 5 May and ended on 11 June 2017. In all rounds a best-of-five playoff format was used.

Quarterfinals
1	ratiopharm Ulm	3
8	MHP Riesen Ludwigsburg	2
4	Medi Bayreuth	1
5	EWE Baskets Oldenburg	3
3	Bayern Munich	3
6	ALBA Berlin	1
2	Brose Bamberg	3
7	Telekom Baskets Bonn	1

Semifinals
1	ratiopharm Ulm	2
5	EWE Baskets Oldenburg	3
3	Bayern Munich	0
2	Brose Bamberg	3

Finals
5	EWE Baskets Oldenburg	0
2	Brose Bamberg	3

== Awards ==
Most Valuable Player

- (United States) Raymar Morgan, ratiopharm Ulm

Best Offensive Player

- (United States) Raymar Morgan, ratiopharm Ulm

Best Defender

- (Germany) Daniel Theis, Brose Bamberg

Best German Young Player

- (Germany) İsmet Akpınar, Alba Berlin

Coach of the Year

- (Germany) Thorsten Leibenath, ratiopharm Ulm

Most Effective Players

- (Germany) Maxi Kleber, Bayern Munich
- (United States) Raymar Morgan, ratiopharm Ulm

All-BBL Teams

Pos.	All-BBL First Team		All-BBL Second Team	
Pos.	Player	Club	Player	Club
PG	(United States) Chris Kramer	EWE Baskets Oldenburg	(United States) Josh Mayo	Telekom Baskets Bonn
SG	(United States) Chris Babb	ratiopharm Ulm	(United States) Trey Lewis	Medi bayreuth
SF	(United States) Darius Miller	Brose Bamberg	(United States) Rickey Paulding	EWE Baskets Oldenburg
PF	(Italy) Nicolò Melli	Brose Bamberg	(Germany) Maxi Kleber	Bayern Munich
C	(United States) Raymar Morgan	ratiopharm Ulm	(United States) Brian Qvale	EWE Baskets Oldenburg

== All-Star Game ==
The 2017 All-Star Game was played in Bonn on January 14, 2017. Team International beat Team National 102–99 in the Telekom Dome, Philipp Schwethelm was named MVP.

(Germany) Team National
Pos	Player	Team	Selections
Starters
G	Per Günther	ratiopharm Ulm	8
G	Maodo Lô	Brose Bamberg	1
F	Maxi Kleber	Bayern Munich	2
F	Tim Ohlbrecht	ratiopharm Ulm	4
F	Daniel Theis	Brose Bamberg	4
Reserves
G	Niels Giffey	Alba Berlin	3
G	Maurice Stuckey	s.Oliver Würzburg	2
G	Steve Wachalski	Medi bayreuth	1
F	Danilo Barthel	Bayern Munich	3
F	Isaiah Philmore	Tigers Tübingen	1
F	Johannes Thiemann	MHP Riesen Ludwigsburg	1
G	Patrick Heckmann	Brose Bamberg	1
F	Philipp Schwethelm	EWE Baskets Oldenburg	5
Head coach: Thorsten Leibenath (ratiopharm Ulm)

Team International
Pos	Player	Team	Selections
Starters
G	(United States) Rickey Paulding	EWE Baskets Oldenburg	4
G	(United States) Chris Babb	ratiopharm Ulm	1
F	(United States) Darius Miller	Brose Bamberg	2
F	(Italy) Nicolò Melli	Brose Bamberg	2
C	(United States) Raymar Morgan	ratiopharm Ulm	1
Reserves
G	(United States) Ryan Thompson	Telekom Baskets Bonn	2
C	(Bosnia and Herzegovina) Elmedin Kikanović	Alba Berlin	1
G	(United States) Marcos Knight	Science City Jena	1
F	(United States) Julius Jenkins	Science City Jena	6
F	(United States) Trey Lewis	Medi bayreuth	1
F	(United States) Cameron Wells	Gießen 46ers	1
C	(United States) Jack Cooley	MHP Riesen Ludwigsburg	1
Head coach: (Austria) Raoul Korner (Medi bayreuth)

== Average attendances ==
Attendances include playoffs games and matches played against Phoenix Hagen.

Pos	Team	Total	High	Low	Average	Change
1	Alba Berlin	189,366	13,022	6,376	9,967	+4.1%
2	Brose Bamberg	138,640	6,580	6,150	6,302	−3.2%
3	ratiopharm Ulm	142,600	6,200	6,200	6,200	0.0%
4	Bayern Munich	115,854	6,700	4,322	6,098	+2.3%
5	EWE Baskets Oldenburg	116,445	6,000	4,459	5,545	+5.9%
6	Telekom Baskets Bonn	100,500	6,000	4,530	5,289	−1.7%
7	Skyliners Frankfurt	72,406	5,002	3,860	4,525	−0.9%
8	MHP Riesen Ludwigsburg	69,806	4,500	2,692	3,878	−3.8%
9	Eisbären Bremerhaven	63,010	8,670	2,230	3,706	+4.1%
10	Gießen 46ers	54,654	3,752	3,076	3,416	−2.7%
11	BG Göttingen	52,919	3,700	3,002	3,307	−3.1%
12	Medi bayreuth	56,850	3,300	2,630	3,158	+3.7%
13	Rasta Vechta	53,380	3,140	3,140	3,140	n/a^{1}
14	s.Oliver Würzburg	49,626	3,140	3,029	3,102	−1.2%
15	Tigers Tübingen	48,724	3,132	2,850	3,045	+0.1%
16	Phoenix Hagen	16,131	3,062	2,412	2,689	−12.3%^{2}
17	Science City Jena	41,842	3,000	2,240	2,615	n/a^{1}
18	Basketball Löwen Braunschweig	39,816	3,615	2,005	2,489	−19.7%
	League total	1,422,569	13,022	2,005	4,574	+1.3%

Notes:
1: Team played the previous season in Pro A.
2: Retired during the regular season.

== See also ==
- 2016–17 ProA
- 2016–17 ProB
