= BBL Most Effective Player =

German basketball award

The Basketball Bundesliga Most Effective Player Awards are annual awards that are given to the best player in a given Basketball Bundesliga (BBL) season, based on statistics. The awards were handed out for the first time in the 2015–16 season. Two awards are given, one for the most effective German player in the league, and one for the most effective international (non-German) player in the league.

The winner of the award is determined by the Efficiency formula:

(PTS + REB + AST + STL + BLK − Missed FG − Missed FT − TO) / GP

== Key ==
^	Denotes player who is still active in the Basketliga
*	Inducted into the FIBA Hall of Fame
†	Denotes player whose team won championship that year
Player (X)	Denotes the number of times the player has received the award

== International winners ==
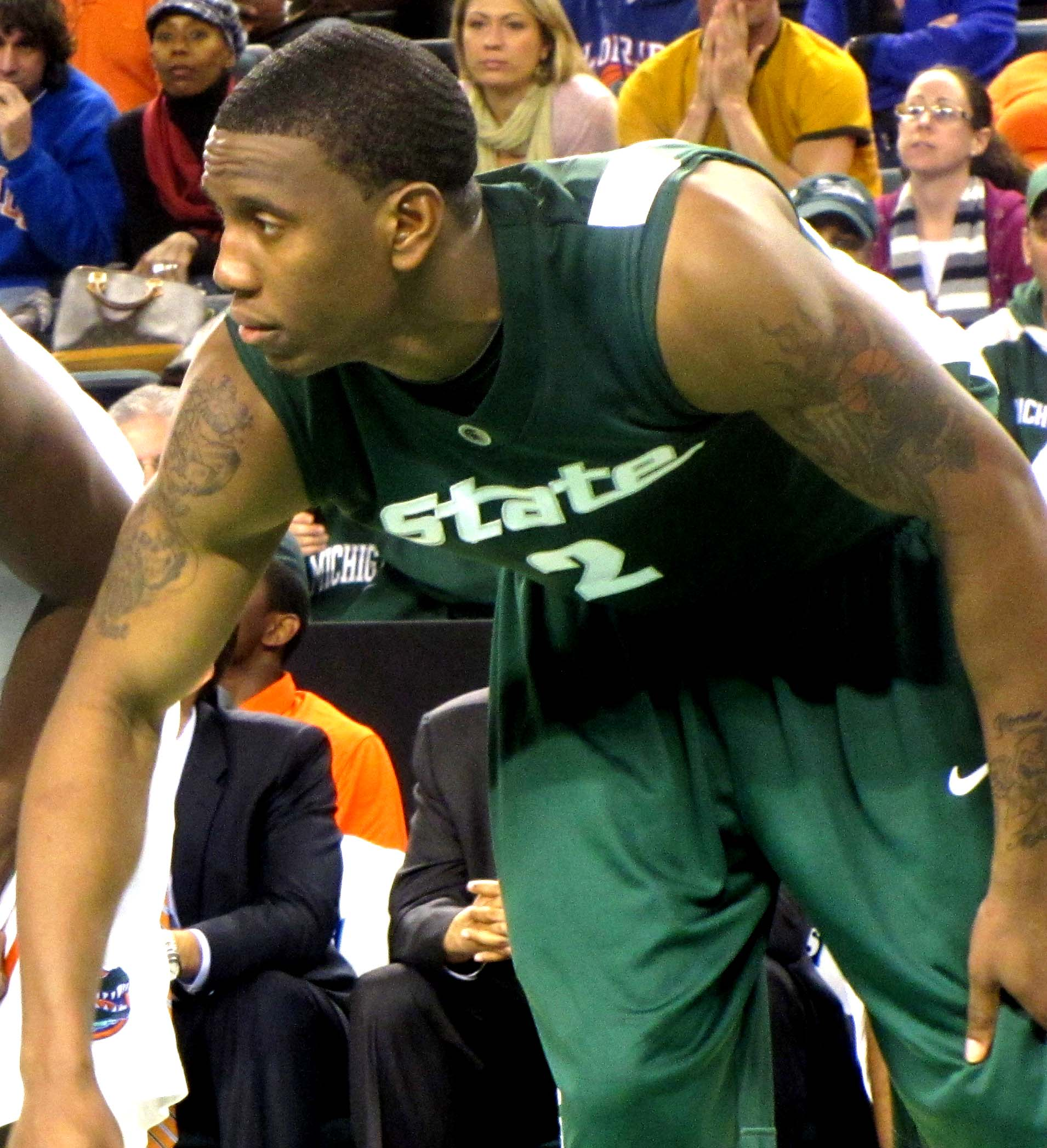
Raymar Morgan of ratiopharm Ulm won the award in 2017.

International Most Effective Player
Season	Player	Position	Nationality	Club	EFF	Ref(s)
2015–16	Brian Qvale	Center	United States	EWE Baskets Oldenburg	18.9	
2016–17	Raymar Morgan	Forward	United States	ratiopharm Ulm	20.1	
2017–18	John Bryant^	Center	United States	Gießen 46ers	24.1	
2018–19	John Bryant (2)^	Center	United States	Gießen 46ers	24.1	
2019–20	No award was given, due to the shortened season because of the COVID-19 pandemic.					
2020–21	David Kravish^	Power forward	United States	Brose Bamberg	21.1	
2021–22	Parker Jackson-Cartwright^	Point guard	United States	Telekom Baskets Bonn	19.6	
2022–23	T. J. Shorts^	Point guard	United States	Telekom Baskets Bonn	21.1	
2023–24	Otis Livingston II^	Point guard	United States	Würzburg Baskets	21.2	
2024–25	Jhivvan Jackson^	Guard	United States	Würzburg Baskets	16.9	
2025–26	Jaedon LeDee^	Center	United States	Skyliners Frankfurt	20.2	

== German winners ==
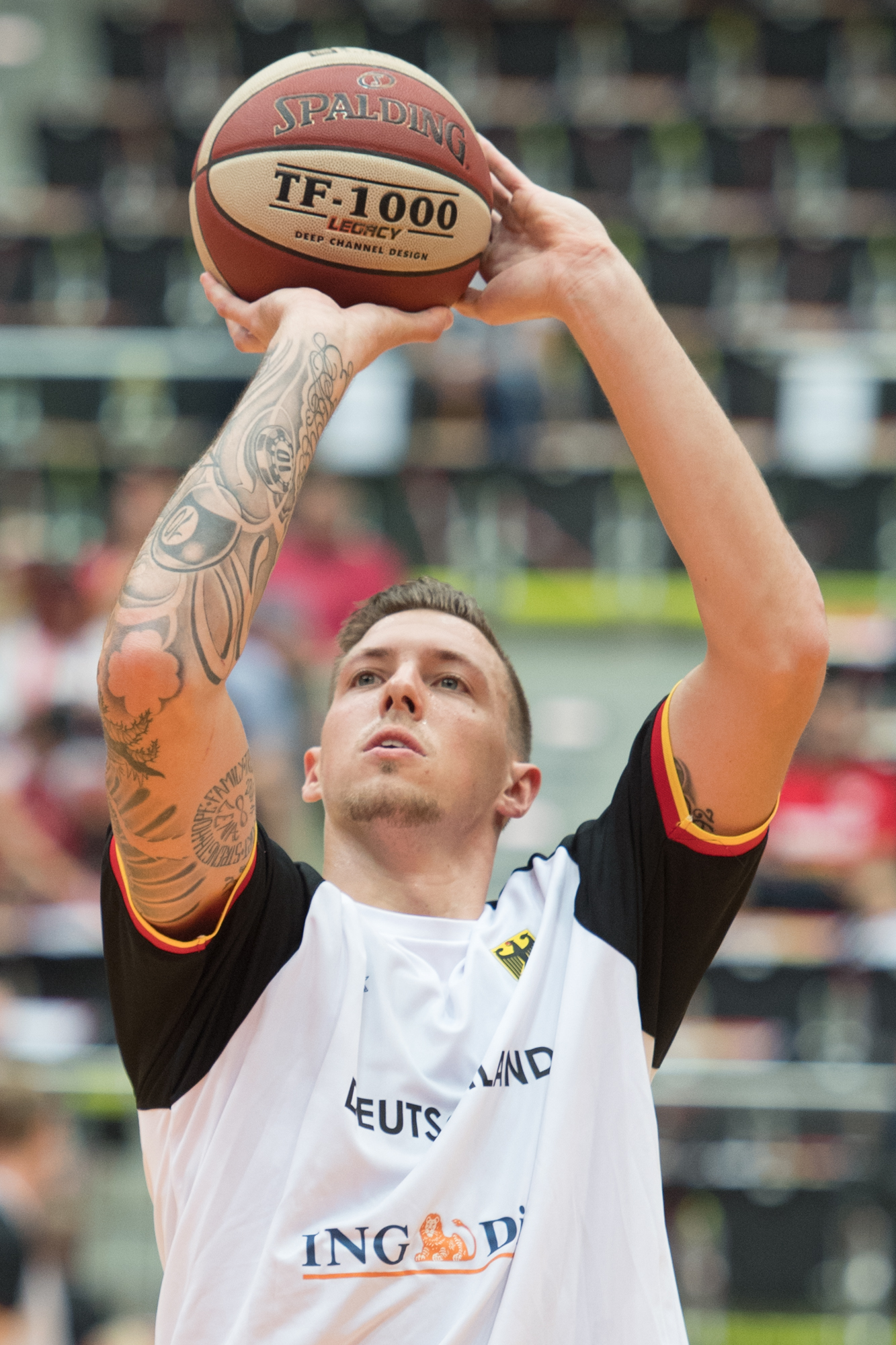
Daniel Theis won the first German award.

National Most Effective Player
Season	Player	Position	Nationality	Club	EFF	Ref(s)
2015–16†	Daniel Theis	Center	Germany	Brose Baskets	15.5	
2016–17	Maxi Kleber	Forward	Germany	Bayern Munich	14.1	
2017–18	Robin Benzing^	Forward	Germany	s.Oliver Würzburg	14.6	
2018–19	Danilo Barthel^	Forward	Germany	Bayern Munich	16.4	
2019–20	No award was given, due to the shortened season because of the COVID-19 pandemic.					
2020–21	John Bryant^	Center	Germany	Giessen 46ers	19.3	
2021–22	Christian Sengfelder^	Power forward	Germany	Brose Bamberg	16.4	
2022–23	Kevin Yebo^	Power forward	Germany	Niners Chemnitz	15.1	
2023–24	Kevin Yebo^	Power forward	Germany	Niners Chemnitz	16.8	
2024–25	Sananda Fru^	Power forward	Germany	Basketball Löwen Braunschweig	17.4	
2025–26	Kevin Yebo^	Power forward	Germany	Niners Chemnitz	15.2	
