= Darius Miller =

American basketball player (born 1990)

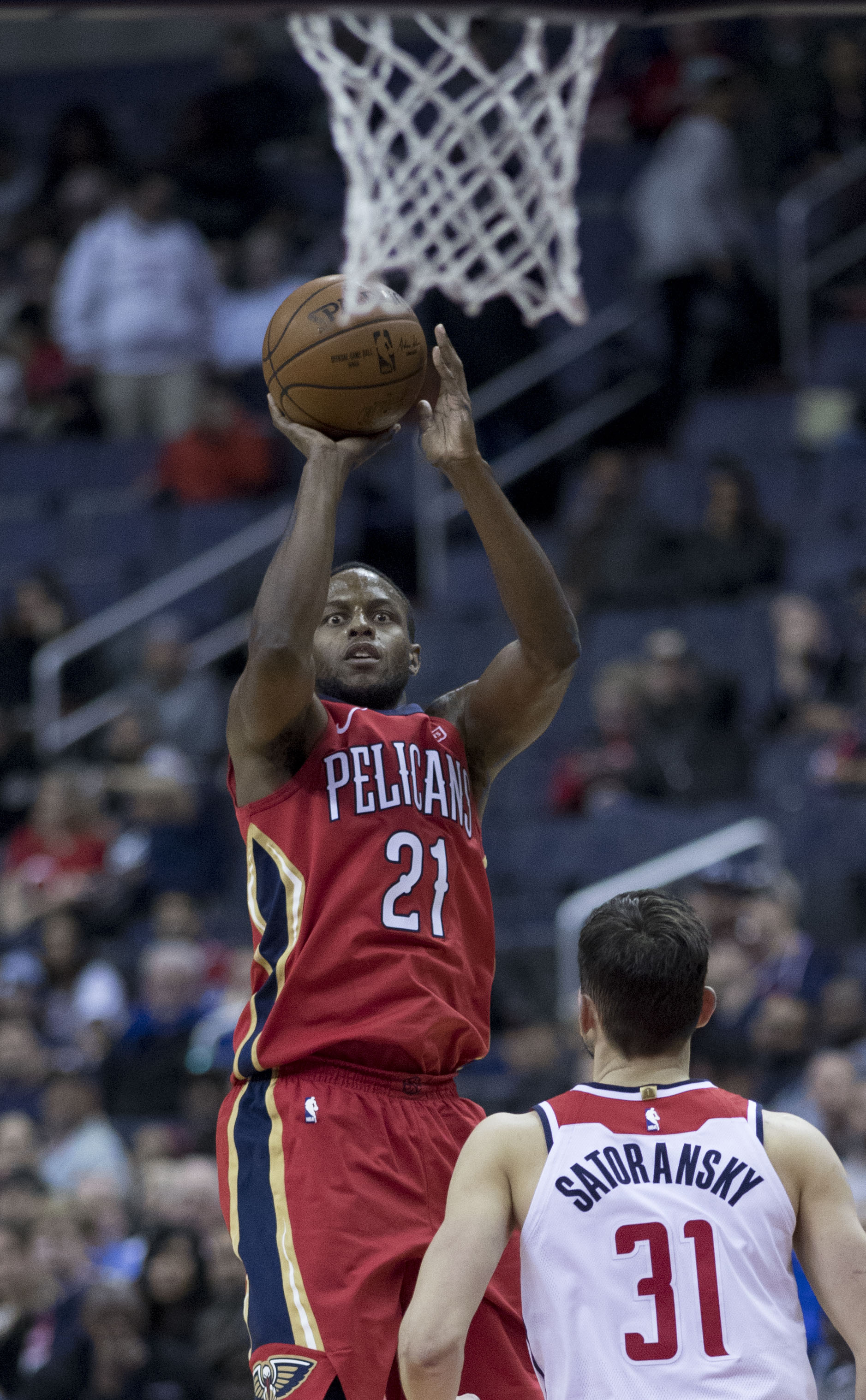
- Miller with the New Orleans Pelicans in 2017

Personal information
- Born: March 21, 1990 (age 36) Maysville, Kentucky, U.S.
- Listed height: 6 ft 6 in (1.98 m)
- Listed weight: 225 lb (102 kg)

Career information
- High school: Mason County (Maysville, Kentucky)
- College: Kentucky (2008–2012)
- NBA draft: 2012: 2nd round, 46th overall pick
- Drafted by: New Orleans Hornets
- Playing career: 2012–2021
- Position: Small forward
- Number: 2, 21, 12

Career history
- 2012–2014: New Orleans Hornets / Pelicans
- 2012–2013: →Iowa Energy
- 2015–2017: Brose Bamberg
- 2017–2020: New Orleans Pelicans
- 2020–2021: Oklahoma City Thunder

Career highlights
- All-Bundesliga First Team (2017); All-Bundesliga Second Team (2016); Bundesliga Finals MVP (2016); EuroLeague 50–40–90 club (2016); 3× Bundesliga champion (2015–2017); German Cup winner (2017); BBL Champions Cup winner (2015); NCAA champion (2012); SEC Sixth Man of the Year (2012); SEC tournament MVP (2011); Kentucky Mr. Basketball (2008); Third-team Parade All-American (2008)
- Stats at NBA.com
- Stats at Basketball Reference
Medals
Men's basketball
Representing the United States
U-19 World Championship
Gold medal – first place	2009 New Zealand	Team

Darius Tiyon Miller (born March 21, 1990) is an American former professional basketball player. He played college basketball for the Kentucky Wildcats and finished his senior season by winning the 2012 NCAA Men's Division I Basketball Tournament on the 2011–12 Kentucky Wildcats team.

== High school career ==
Miller attended Mason County High School, where he averaged 19.9 points, 7.9 rebounds, 3.6 assists and 2.9 steals per game and led the team to a state championship in 2008. After his senior season in high school, Miller was named the KHSAA's men's basketball player of the year, commonly known as "Kentucky Mr. Basketball".

Considered a four-star recruit by Rivals.com, Miller was listed as the No. 8 small forward and the No. 42 player in the nation in 2008.

== College career ==
Following Kentucky's 2012 national championship win, Miller was chosen to present a commemorative Kentucky jersey and championship ring to President Barack Obama during the team's visit to the White House on May 4, 2012. Miller is the only player from Kentucky to have been named Kentucky's "Mr. Basketball" (high school player of the year in the state), win a KHSAA state championship (Mason County High School) and claim an NCAA title with the University of Kentucky.

Miller finished his college career having played more games for the University of Kentucky than any other player. The Wildcats' championship game and Miller's last collegiate match was his 152nd appearance for the team, surpassing Wayne Turner's previous record of 151 games. He and Deon Thompson of North Carolina are currently tied for sixth place in career games in NCAA Division I men's play, and have the most games among those who played in exactly four seasons.

== Professional career ==
=== New Orleans Hornets / Pelicans (2012–2014) ===
Miller was selected with the 46th overall pick in the 2012 NBA draft by the New Orleans Hornets. On August 22, 2012, he signed a multi-year deal with the Hornets. On December 31, 2012, Miller was assigned to the Iowa Energy. On January 27, 2013, he was recalled by the Hornets. In April 2013, the Hornets were renamed the Pelicans.

On July 25, 2014, Miller re-signed with the Pelicans. On November 30, 2014, he was waived by the Pelicans.

On January 16, 2015, Miller was opted over another D-League player for a position on the Clippers.

=== Brose Bamberg (2015–2017) ===
On February 24, 2015, Miller signed with Brose Bamberg of Germany for the rest of the 2014–15 season. On July 28, 2015, he re-signed with Brose Baskets for one more season. On June 7, 2016, he signed a two-year contract extension with Bamberg. On July 19, 2017, he parted ways with Bamberg in order to return to the NBA.

=== Return to the Pelicans (2017–2020) ===
On July 27, 2017, Miller signed with the New Orleans Pelicans, returning to the franchise for a second stint. On November 13, 2017, he scored a career-high 21 points in a 106–105 win over the Atlanta Hawks.

On December 31, 2018, Miller scored 13 of his 21 points in the fourth quarter of the Pelicans' 123–114 win over the Minnesota Timberwolves. On January 24, 2019, he matched a career high with 21 points in a 122–116 loss to the Oklahoma City Thunder.

On July 3, 2019, after becoming a free agent, he signed a two-year contract with the New Orleans Pelicans. On August 29, 2019, the Pelicans announced that Miller would be out indefinitely after undergoing surgery to repair a ruptured right Achilles tendon.

=== Oklahoma City Thunder (2020–2021) ===
On November 24, 2020, Miller was traded to the Oklahoma City Thunder. On April 8, 2021, he was waived by the Thunder after 18 appearances.

== NBA career statistics ==
Legend
GP	Games played	GS	Games started	MPG	Minutes per game
FG%	Field goal percentage	3P%	3-point field goal percentage	FT%	Free throw percentage
RPG	Rebounds per game	APG	Assists per game	SPG	Steals per game
BPG	Blocks per game	PPG	Points per game	**Bold**	Career high
*	Led the league

=== Regular season ===
Year	Team	GP	GS	MPG	FG%	3P%	FT%	RPG	APG	SPG	BPG	PPG
2012–13	New Orleans	52	2	13.3	.407	.393	**1.000**	1.5	.8	.3	.2	2.3
2013–14	New Orleans	45	7	16.1	.440	.325	.806	1.2	1.0	.5	.2	4.4
2014–15	New Orleans	5	1	8.6	.143	.000	.000	.2	.4	.2	.0	.4
2017–18	New Orleans	**82***	3	23.7	.444	**.411**	.866	**2.0**	1.4	.3	.2	7.8
2018–19	New Orleans	69	**15**	**25.5**	.390	.365	.789	1.9	**2.1**	.6	**.3**	**8.2**
2020–21	Oklahoma City	18	0	10.9	**.458**	.405	**1.000**	1.3	1.2	**.7**	**.3**	4.1
Career		271	28	19.8	.419	.383	.840	1.6	1.4	.5	.2	5.9

=== Playoffs ===
Year	Team	GP	GS	MPG	FG%	3P%	FT%	RPG	APG	SPG	BPG	PPG
2018	New Orleans	9	0	18.0	.412	.375	1.000	2.2	1.2	.6	.0	4.8
Career		9	0	18.0	.412	.375	1.000	2.2	1.2	.6	.0	4.8

== National team career ==
Miller represented the U-19 United States national team at the 2009 U-19 World Championship held in New Zealand, where they won the gold medal.

== See also ==
- List of NCAA Division I men's basketball career games played leaders
