= Josh Mayo =

American basketball player

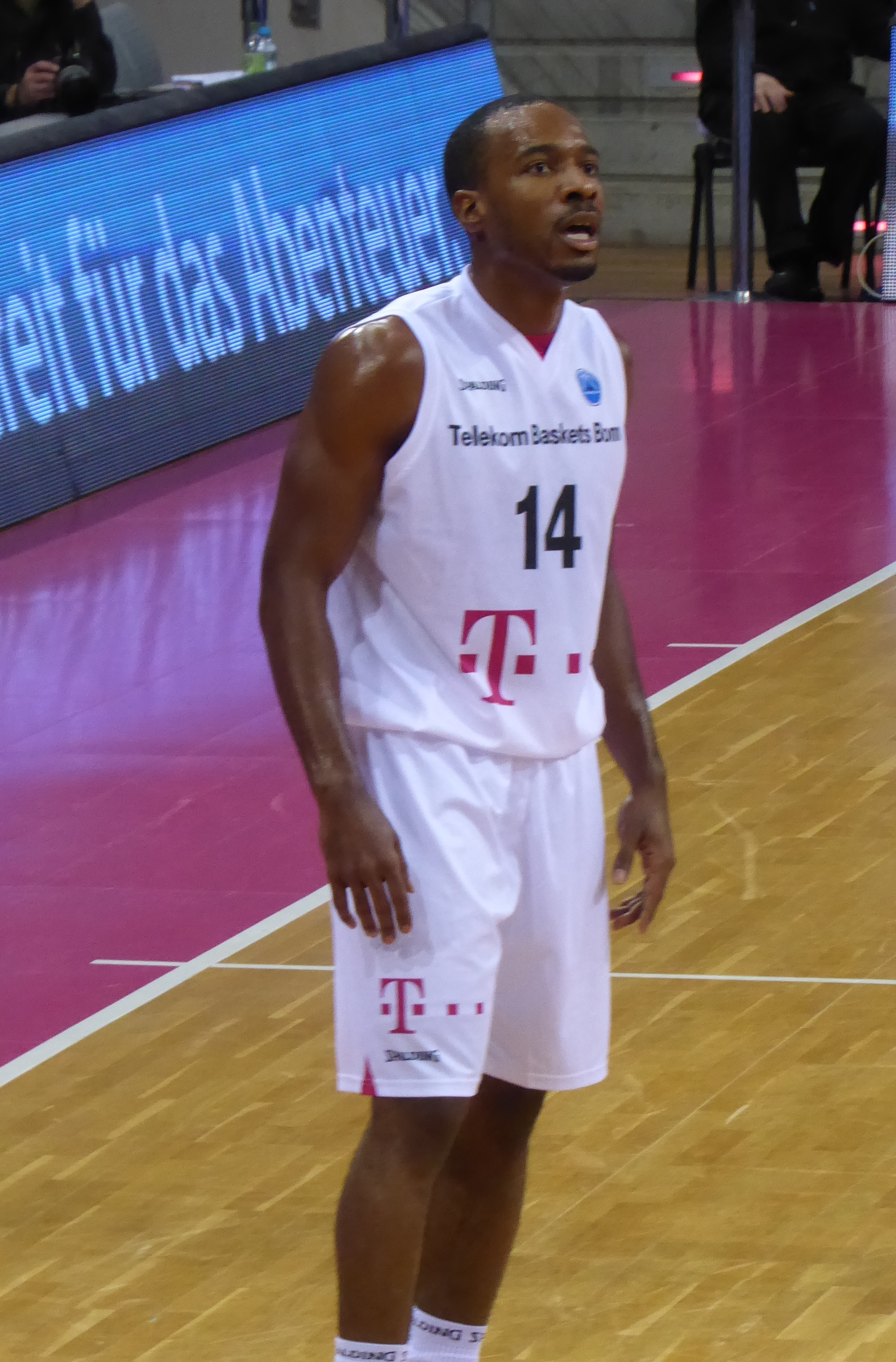
- Mayo with Bonn in 2016.

Free Agent
- Position: Point guard

Personal information
- Born: July 17, 1987 (age 39) Merrillville, Indiana
- Listed height: 5 ft 11 in (1.80 m)
- Listed weight: 174 lb (79 kg)

Career information
- High school: Merrillville (Merrillville, Indiana)
- College: UIC (2005–2009)
- NBA draft: 2009: undrafted
- Playing career: 2009–present

Career history
- 2010: Stade Clermontois
- 2011–2012: Liepājas Lauvas
- 2012–2013: MBC Mykolaiv
- 2013–2014: Sutor Montegranaro
- 2014: Virtus Roma
- 2014–2015: Torku Konyaspor
- 2015: Fuenlabrada
- 2015–2016: Scafati Basket
- 2016–2019: Telekom Baskets Bonn
- 2019–2020: Varese
- 2020–2021: Napoli Basket

Career highlights
- All-Bundesliga Second Team (2018); 2× German All-Star (2017, 2018); Serie A2 Cup winner (2016); 2× First-team All-Horizon League (2008, 2009)

Joshua Andrew Mayo (born 17 July 1987) is an American professional basketball player who last played for Napoli Basket of the Italian Lega Basket Serie A (LBA).

== Professional career ==
May was selected for the BBL All-Star Game in two consecutive years, as he participated in 2017 and 2018.

On June 27, 2019, he has signed two-year deal with Varese of the LBA. Mayo signed with Napoli Basket on June 21, 2020.

On June 21, 2020, he signed a deal with Napoli Basket in of the Serie A2 Basket second tier Italian national competition. On October 22, 2021, he has parted ways related with family problems.
