= Raymar Morgan =

American basketball player

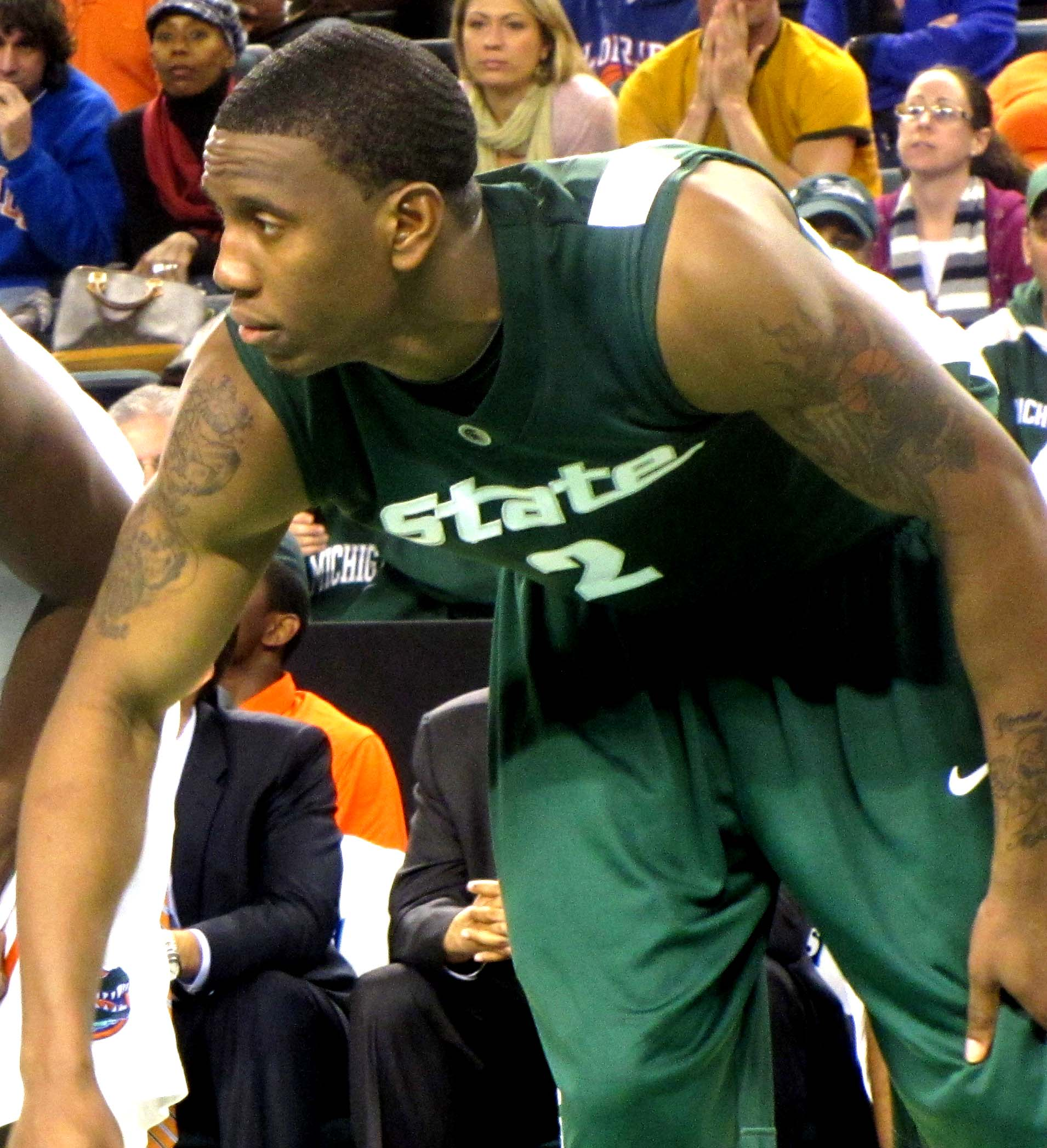
- Morgan with Michigan State in 2009

Free agent
- Position: Power forward / center

Personal information
- Born: August 8, 1988 (age 38) Canton, Ohio, U.S.
- Listed height: 6 ft 8 in (2.03 m)
- Listed weight: 231 lb (105 kg)

Career information
- High school: McKinley (Canton, Ohio)
- College: Michigan State (2006–2010)
- NBA draft: 2010: undrafted
- Playing career: 2010–2022, 2024–present

Career history
- 2010–2011: Maccabi Rishon LeZion
- 2011: Pınar Karşıyaka
- 2011–2012: Ironi Ashkelon
- 2012–2013: Barak Netanya
- 2014–2015: BG Göttingen
- 2015: Panathinaikos
- 2015–2017: ratiopharm Ulm
- 2017–2018: Tofaş
- 2018–2020: UNICS Kazan
- 2020–2021: Pınar Karşıyaka
- 2021–2022: ASVEL Villeurbanne
- 2022: Galatasaray Nef
- 2022: Manisa BB
- 2024–2025: Science City Jena

Career highlights
- LNB Pro A champion (2022); All-Champions League First Team (2021); Bundesliga MVP (2017); Bundesliga Most Effective Player (2017); All-Bundesliga First Team (2017); Bundesliga Offensive Best Offensive Player (2017); Bundesliga Top Scorer (2017); All-Bundesliga Second Team (2015); Second-team Aell-Big Ten (2008); Third-team All-Big Ten – Coaches (2010); Fourth-team Parade All-American (2006)
Medals
Men's basketball
Representing United States
FIBA U19 World Championship
Silver medal – second place	2007 Serbia	National team

Jeffery Raymar Morgan II (born August 8, 1988) is an American professional basketball player who last played for Science City Jena of the German ProA. He played college basketball at the Michigan State University.

== Basketball information ==
=== High school ===
- Averaged 24.4 points and 9.0 rebounds as a senior at Canton McKinley High School, playing for coach Dave Hoover
- Led McKinley to 2006 Division I state title, being named Most Outstanding Player of the all-tournament team for the second straight season
- Named 2006 Ohio Division I Player of the Year, 2005 Ohio Division I second team, 2004 Ohio Division I honorable mention
- Finished his career as McKinley's all-time leading scorer with 1,553 points
- The Bulldogs were 73–7 with Morgan in the starting lineup during his three years and never lost a home game
- In 2005, Led McKinley to a 26–1 record and a Division 1 state championship, recording 18 points and six rebounds in a 51–42 victory over St. Xavier in the state finals
- Won the 2005 AND1 High School Basketball Championship in late June, earning MVP honors
- Rated the No. 11 small forward and No. 34 player overall in the 2006 class by Scout.com
- Rated the No. 11 small forward and No. 33 player overall in the 2006 class by rivals.com
- Rated the No. 69 small forward and No. 22 overall player in the 2006 class by risemag.com
- Attended Canton McKinley High School, the same one as fellow Spartan alumnus Eric Snow

== College career ==
=== 2006–07 season ===
Selected to the Big Ten All-Freshman Team as voted on by the league's coaches • Appeared in 28 games, starting 25 • MSU's second-leading scorer (11.7 ppg) and third-leading rebounder (5.2 rpg) • Ranked fourth among Big Ten freshmen in scoring and third in rebounding • Ranked 19th in the Big Ten in scoring, 17th in rebounding and 11th in field-goal percentage (.486) • Averaged 16.5 points and 7.0 rebounds in two NCAA Tournament games, including scoring a season-high 19 points against North Carolina (3/17) in the second round.

=== 2007–08 season ===
Second-team All-Big Ten as selected by the league's media and coaches • Started all 36 games. Ranked sixth in the Big Ten in scoring (14.0 ppg), fourth in field-goal percentage (.558) and ninth in rebounding (6.1 rpg). Scored a career-high 31 points and grabbed 10 rebounds vs. Minnesota (1/5), marking the first 30-point, 10-rebound game by a Spartan against a Big Ten opponent since Morris Peterson did it against Michigan in 2000.

=== 2008–09 season ===
Appeared in 35 games, starting 26 • Honorable Mention All-Big Ten selection despite playing 20-plus minutes in just nine of 18 league contests due to illness • Averaged 10.2 points and 5.3 rebounds for the season, ranking third on the team in scoring average and second in rebounding • Averaged 15.2 points and 6.9 rebounds in the first 16 games of the season, prior to suffering from walking pneumonia/mononucleosis • Michigan State was 21-2 when Morgan played 20 minutes or more.

=== 2009–10 season ===
Third-team All-Big Ten by coaches and honorable mention by the media • Second on the team in scoring, rebounding, and minutes • Averaged 11.3 points and 6.2 rebounds per game • Averaged 10.4 points in trip to Final Four.

== Professional career ==
=== Maccabi Rishon LeZion (2010–2011) ===
On July 31, 2010, Morgan signed with Israeli club Maccabi Rishon LeZion

=== Pınar Karşıyaka (2011) ===
In July 2011 he signed with Pınar Karşıyaka.

=== BG Göttingen (2014–2015) ===
In August 2014, he signed with BG Göttingen of Germany.

=== Panathinaikos (2015) ===
On May 12, 2015, he signed with Greek club Panathinaikos.

=== ratiopharm Ulm (2015–2017) ===
On July 15, 2015, he signed a two-year contract with the German club ratiopharm Ulm. On May 4, 2017, Morgan won the BBL Best Offensive Player award after he ended the season as the BBL scoring champion. Morgan averaged 18.1 points per game over the 32 games he played in the regular season.

=== Tofaş (2017–2018) ===
On June 29, 2017, Morgan signed with Turkish club Tofaş.

=== UNICS Kazan (2018–2020) ===
On June 25, 2018, Morgan signed 1+1 year contract with UNICS of the VTB United League. Before the beginning of 2019–20 season, UNICS decided to use their option and extended his contract for one more year. Morgan averaged 12.2 points and 5.0 rebounds per game in the 2019–20 season.

=== Pınar Karşıyaka (2020–2021) ===
On July 20, 2020, he signed with Pınar Karşıyaka of the Turkish Basketball Super League.

=== ASVEL Villeurbanne (2021–2022) ===
On July 2, 2021, Morgan signed with ASVEL of the LNB Pro A. Because of his injury he made just one Euroleague appearance.

=== Galatasaray Nef (2022) ===
On June 28, 2022, Morgan signed with Galatasaray Nef of the Turkish Basketbol Süper Ligi.

=== Manisa Büyükşehir Belediyespor (2022) ===
On November 16, 2022, Morgan signed with Manisa BB of the Turkish Basketbol Süper Ligi. On December 24, Morgan announced his retirement from professional basketball due to a back injury.

=== Science City Jena (2024–2025) ===
On August 30, 2024, Morgan signed with Science City Jena of the German second tier ProA.

== See also ==
- 2006 high school boys basketball All-Americans
