= Brian Qvale =

American basketball player (born 1988)

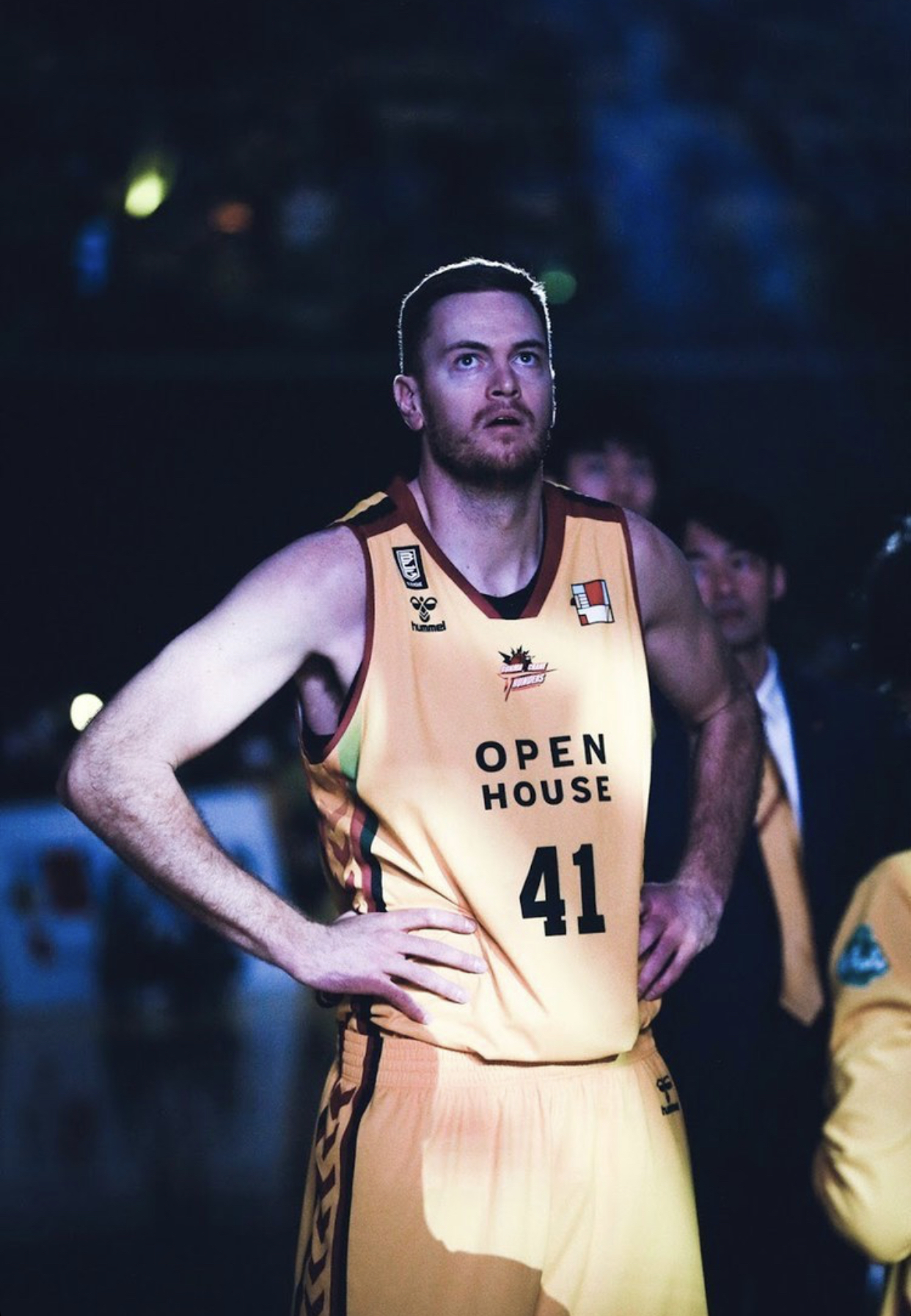
- Qvale in Japan 2020

Free agent
- Position: Center

Personal information
- Born: November 3, 1988 (age 37) Williston, North Dakota, U.S.
- Listed height: 6 ft 11 in (2.11 m)
- Listed weight: 260 lb (118 kg)

Career information
- High school: Williston (Williston, North Dakota)
- College: Montana (2007–2011)
- NBA draft: 2011: undrafted
- Playing career: 2011–present

Career history
- 2011–2012: Aliağa Petkim
- 2012–2013: Belfius Mons-Hainaut
- 2013–2014: Medi Bayreuth
- 2014–2015: Tofaş
- 2015–2017: EWE Baskets Oldenburg
- 2017–2018: Lokomotiv Kuban
- 2018–2019: Virtus Bologna
- 2019–2020: Shimane Susanoo Magic
- 2020–2021: Gunma Crane Thunders
- 2021-2022: Toyotsu Fighting Eagles Nagoya

Career highlights
- B2 League Champion (2022); B2 League Champion (2021); FIBA Champions League champion (2019); All-Bundesliga First Team (2016); All-Bundesliga Second Team (2017); Bundesliga Most Effective Player (2016); First-team All-Big Sky (2011); Big Sky Defensive Player of the Year (2011); North Dakota Mr. Basketball (2007)
- Stats at Basketball Reference

Brian Arthur Qvale (/ˈkwɑːliː/ KWAH-lee; born November 3, 1988) is an American professional basketball player who last played for Toyotsu Fighting Eagles Nagoya of the Japan - B2 League. He played college basketball for the University of Montana before moving to Europe and playing for teams in Turkey, Belgium and Germany.

== High school career ==
Qvale attended Williston High School in Williston, North Dakota. He lettered in four sports, and was awarded a total of 12 varsity letters throughout his career – four years in basketball and football, three in baseball, and one in track and field. In basketball, he was named all-state three times, and all-conference on one occasion under head coach Mark Slotsve. As a senior, Qvale was North Dakota Mr. Basketball and labeled Male Athlete of the Year for the state. He averaged 21 points, 11 rebounds, 4 assists, and led the team to a conference championship behind a 22–4 record.

Following his high school years, Qvale was listed as a two-star recruit by Rivals.com and 247Sports.com. On August 17, 2006, he committed to Montana, and officially enrolled with University of Montana on June 30, 2007. He also considered Boise State, Colorado State, Portland State, Utah State, Washington State and Wyoming as possible college choices.

== College career ==
With the Montana Grizzlies, Qvale was recognized as one of the premier centers in the Big Sky Conference. He led the team in blocks in his true freshman season, and ranked fourth in rebounding. In his sophomore year, Qvale was tied for being the top rebounder on Montana, and recorded his first double-double in the season opener against Colorado State. He was awarded the John Eaheart Memorial Award, given to the most outstanding defensive player on the team, after finishing his second season with 1.8 blocks per game. As a junior in 2009–10, Qvale earned the title as the team's top rebounder and was second in blocks in the Big Sky. He also ranked 47th in the NCAA Division I under the category. He earned the John Eaheart Award for the second consecutive season. Prior to his final year with the Grizzlies, Qvale received comments from head coach Wayne Tinkle, who said, "Brian is a guy who we saw grow up right before our eyes in the second half of the season, especially down the stretch. He's carrying himself a lot differently. He's got more pep in his step and he's a lot more confident. He knows that he is the man for us, and needs to be kind of like our enforcer as well as our go-to guy. If he stays comfortable in that role, we look for Brian to have just a huge senior season. A lot of our success will be based around a lot of what he can do on both ends of the floor for us." Qvale finished his stint with Montana averaging 14.9 points and a team-high 8.8 rebounds per game,. He ended his senior season by winning Big Sky Defensive Player of the Year honors. He is the top shot-blocker in Big Sky Conference history for all-time blocks and most blocks for a single season (95 blocks).

== Professional career ==
On June 8, 2011, Qvale signed a one-year deal with Aliağa Petkim of the Turkish Basketball League. His decision was reportedly made partly due to the NBA lockout, on which he said, "That's why I'm taking this as an opportunity to make some money and to get some experience at the pro level. Then I can come back next year or try to move up to a team over there." In 32 games for Aliağa, he averaged 8.9 points and 4.4 rebounds per game.

On July 19, 2012, Qvale signed a one-year deal with Belfius Mons-Hainaut of the Ethias League. In 31 league games for Belfius, he averaged 9.8 points, 6.1 rebounds and 1.1 blocks per game.

On July 30, 2013, Qvale signed a one-year deal with Medi Bayreuth of the Basketball Bundesliga. In 33 games for Bayreuth, he averaged 13.2 points, 6.1 rebounds, 1.1 assists and 1.3 blocks per game.

On September 22, 2014, Qvale signed with the Charlotte Hornets. However, he was later waived by the Hornets on October 24 after appearing in one preseason game. Four days later, he signed with Tofaş of Turkey for the 2014–15 season. In 27 league games for Tofaş, he averaged 11.3 points and 4.1 rebounds per game.

On June 30, 2015, Qvale joined the Charlotte Hornets for the 2015 NBA Summer League, where he averaged 6.0 points and 5.2 rebounds in five games. On July 27, 2015, he signed with EWE Baskets Oldenburg of the German Basketball Bundesliga.

On July 12, 2017, Qvale signed a two-year contract with Russian club Lokomotiv Kuban.

On July 16, 2018, Qvale signed a deal with the Italian club Virtus Bologna.

== Personal life ==
Qvale's younger brother, Brent, is a professional American football player. Their father, Sanford, played offensive tackle at North Dakota State University.
