= Maxi Kleber =

German basketball player (born 1992)

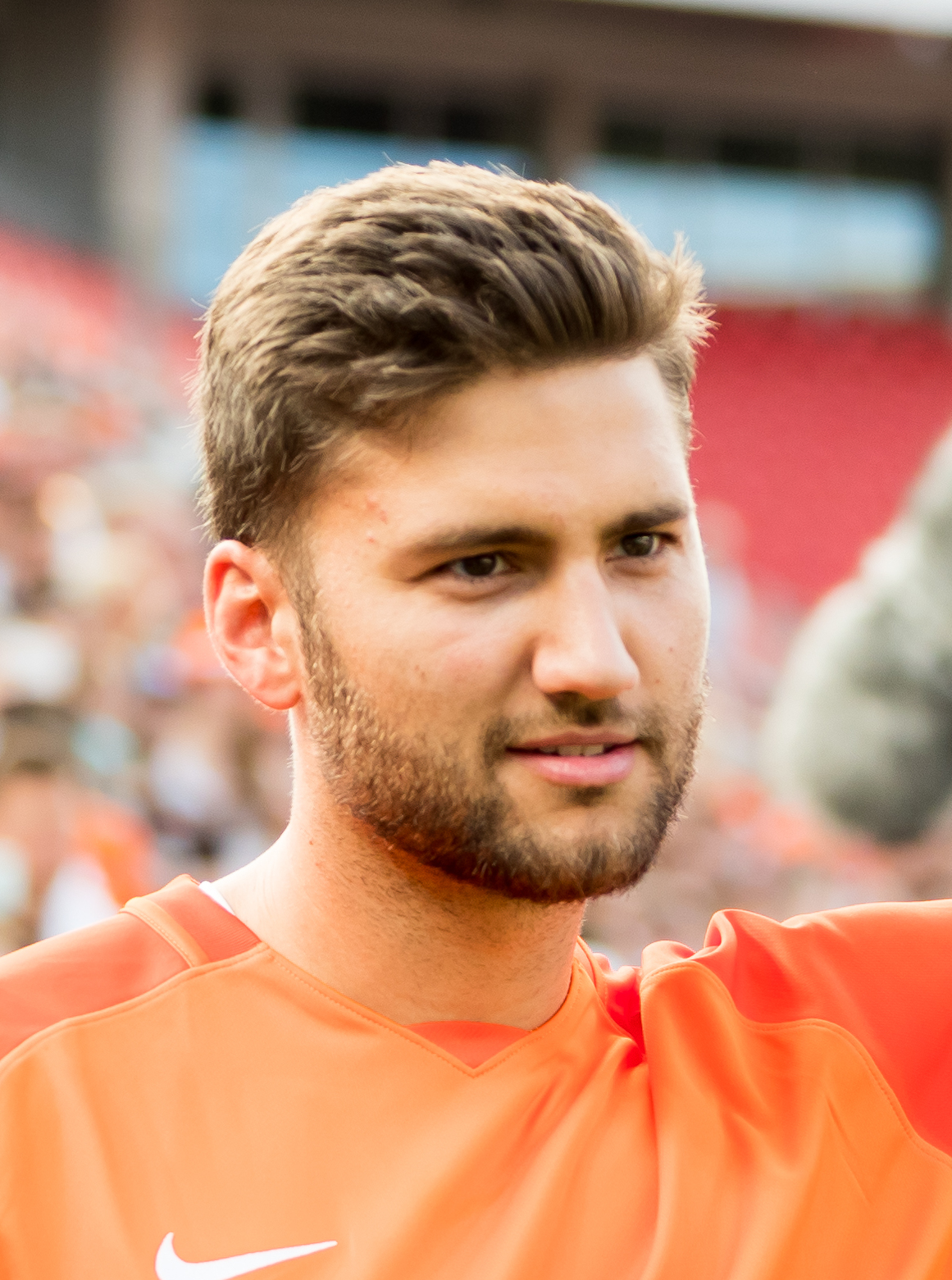
- Kleber in 2019

Free agent
- Position: Power forward / center

Personal information
- Born: 29 January 1992 (age 34) Würzburg, Germany
- Listed height: 6 ft 10 in (2.08 m)
- Listed weight: 240 lb (109 kg)

Career information
- NBA draft: 2014: undrafted
- Playing career: 2011–present

Career history
- 2011–2014: Würzburg
- 2014–2015: Obradoiro
- 2015–2017: Bayern Munich
- 2017–2025: Dallas Mavericks
- 2025–2026: Los Angeles Lakers

Career highlights
- All-EuroCup Second Team (2017); 2× German League All-Star (2015, 2017); All-German League Second Team (2017); German League Most Effective Player (2017); Galician Cup champion (2014)
- Stats at NBA.com
- Stats at Basketball Reference

Maximilian Kleber (born 29 January 1992) is a German professional basketball player who last played for the Los Angeles Lakers of the National Basketball Association (NBA). He spent the first seven years of his career playing in Germany and Spain. In 2017, he joined the Dallas Mavericks, with whom he would play until being traded to the Lakers in 2025.

== Early life ==
Kleber played in the youth ranks of TG Veitshöchheim, SC Heuchelhof and TG Würzburg.

== Professional career ==
=== Würzburg (2011–2014) ===
Kleber made his professional debut in Germany's top-flight Basketball Bundesliga during the 2011–12 season, representing the s.Oliver Baskets, a team based in his hometown Würzburg. In his first year, he was a role player on the team with an average of 7 minutes a game. In his second season, he grew to become an important player on the team, that averaged 9.9 points and 6.7 rebounds per game. In 2012, he declared for the NBA draft before removing his name from the list. He became auto-eligible for the NBA draft in 2014, but was not picked by any team.

=== Obradoiro (2014–2015) ===
In the 2014 off-season, he signed a two-year deal with Spanish club Obradoiro CAB. In the 2014–15 ACB season, he was named MVP of round 25 after scoring 36 points against Fuenlabrada. Kleber made 33 appearances in the league that year, averaging 11.5 points and 6.5 rebounds per game.

=== Bayern Munich (2015–2017) ===
On 1 July 2015, Kleber returned to Germany and signed a two-year deal with Bayern Munich. In 2015–16, he played 24 Bundesliga games for Bayern, including 17 starts, averaging 8.0 points and 4.9 boards per game. He appeared in 37 games (37 starts) during the 2016–17 Bundesliga season, supplying averages of 9.0 points, 5.3 rebounds and 1.8 assists per game.

=== Dallas Mavericks (2017–2025) ===
On 13 July 2017, Kleber signed with the Dallas Mavericks. He made his NBA debut on 21 October 2017 against the Houston Rockets. Kleber moved from end of bench piece to key rotation player in his first few years, increasing his points, rebounds, assists and blocks per game numbers in each of his first three seasons. He was re-signed by the Mavericks on 10 July 2019.

On 21 February 2020, Kleber scored a career-high 26 points against the Orlando Magic in a 122–106 victory. In the 2019–20 season, Kleber posted a career high 9.1 points per game. He led the league in games played with 74 games and finished 19th in the league in blocks per game. Kleber played in his first playoffs that year against the second seed Los Angeles Clippers. Kleber was tasked with guarding Kawhi Leonard for most of the series. Kleber struggled shooting the ball in the series, averaging 6.7 points per game and making just 5 of his 26 three-point attempts across the six-game series.

Kleber began the 2020–21 season strong, averaging 7.4 points per game and shooting 47.2% from three-point range in his first 9 games. Kleber would go on to miss the next 10 games however, as he recovered from COVID-19. Kleber would return to action 2 February 2021 against the Phoenix Suns. He logged 17 minutes of game play, grabbing 6 rebounds and scoring 2 points. Kleber and the Mavericks would go on to lose to the Los Angeles Clippers in the first round of the playoffs in 7 games.

On 18 April 2022, during game 2 of the first round of the playoffs, Kleber scored 25 points and hit eight 3-pointers in a 110–104 win over the Utah Jazz. In the 2022 off-season, he signed a four-year contract extension with the Mavericks.

On 17 March 2023, Kleber made a buzzer-beating, game-winning three-pointer in a 111–110 win over the Los Angeles Lakers. Kleber helped Dallas reach the 2024 NBA Finals where the Mavericks lost to the Boston Celtics in five games.

=== Los Angeles Lakers (2025–2026) ===
On 2 February 2025, Kleber was traded, alongside Luka Dončić and Markieff Morris, to the Los Angeles Lakers in exchange for Max Christie, Anthony Davis and a 2029 first-round pick. The Lakers also traded Jalen Hood-Schifino and a 2025 second round pick to the Utah Jazz, who also acquired a 2025 second-round pick from the Mavericks.

On April 30, 2025, during the first round of the playoffs, Kleber made his debut for the Lakers. He scored two points in a 103–96 loss against the Minnesota Timberwolves, eliminating the Lakers from the playoffs.

On March 21, 2026, Kleber was assigned to the South Bay Lakers to practice after missing six straight games with a back strain.

== National team career ==
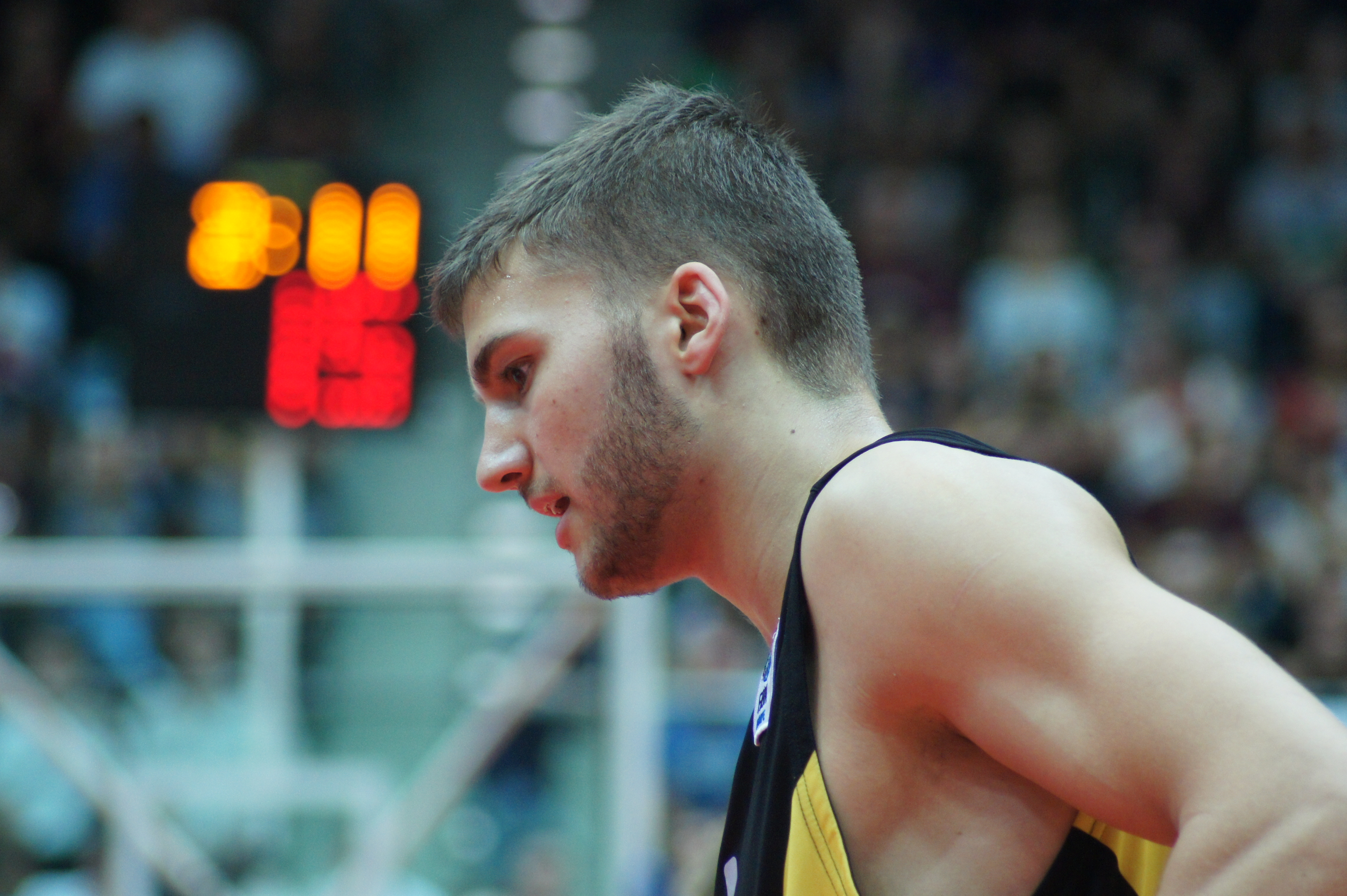
Kleber with the German national team in 2014

Kleber has also played games for the senior German national team. In 2014, he played for the team during the EuroBasket qualification rounds. Kleber was forced to sit out the 2020 Summer Olympics as he was recovering from an Achilles injury.

== NBA career statistics ==
Legend
GP	Games played	GS	Games started	MPG	Minutes per game
FG%	Field goal percentage	3P%	3-point field goal percentage	FT%	Free throw percentage
RPG	Rebounds per game	APG	Assists per game	SPG	Steals per game
BPG	Blocks per game	PPG	Points per game	**Bold**	Career high
*	Led the league

=== Regular season ===
Year	Team	GP	GS	MPG	FG%	3P%	FT%	RPG	APG	SPG	BPG	PPG
2017–18	Dallas	72	35	16.8	**.489**	.313	.746	3.3	.7	.4	.7	5.4
2018–19	Dallas	71	18	21.2	.453	.353	.784	4.6	1.0	**.5**	**1.1**	6.8
2019–20	Dallas	**74***	21	25.5	.461	.373	.849	5.2	1.2	.3	**1.1**	**9.1**
2020–21	Dallas	50	**40**	**26.8**	.422	**.410**	**.919**	5.2	1.4	**.5**	.7	7.1
2021–22	Dallas	59	21	24.6	.398	.325	.708	**5.9**	1.2	**.5**	1.0	7.0
2022–23	Dallas	37	5	25.1	.456	.348	.711	3.6	1.4	.3	.8	5.9
2023–24	Dallas	43	7	20.3	.432	.348	.702	3.3	**1.6**	.4	.7	4.4
2024–25	Dallas	34	4	18.7	.385	.265	.762	2.8	1.3	.3	.5	3.0
2025–26	L.A. Lakers	43	1	10.7	.452	.231	.538	2.0	.6	.4	.3	2.0
Career		483	152	21.3	.444	.352	.763	4.2	1.1	.4	.8	6.0

=== Playoffs ===
Year	Team	GP	GS	MPG	FG%	3P%	FT%	RPG	APG	SPG	BPG	PPG
2020	Dallas	6	**6**	**33.9**	.333	.192	.750	**6.5**	**1.5**	.3	**1.2**	6.7
2021	Dallas	7	4	26.8	.400	.400	.714	3.6	1.4	**.4**	.0	5.3
2022	Dallas	**18**	0	25.4	**.509**	**.436**	.714	4.6	1.1	.2	.8	**8.7**
2024	Dallas	13	0	16.8	.410	.429	.667	1.9	1.0	.2	.3	3.7
2025	L.A. Lakers	1	0	5.0	.000	.000	**1.000**	.0	.0	.0	.0	2.0
2026	L.A. Lakers	3	0	4.7	.000	—	.500	.7	1.0	.3	.0	.3
Career		48	10	22.6	.440	.386	.720	3.6	1.1	.3	.5	5.9
