= Ryan Thompson (basketball) =

American basketball player

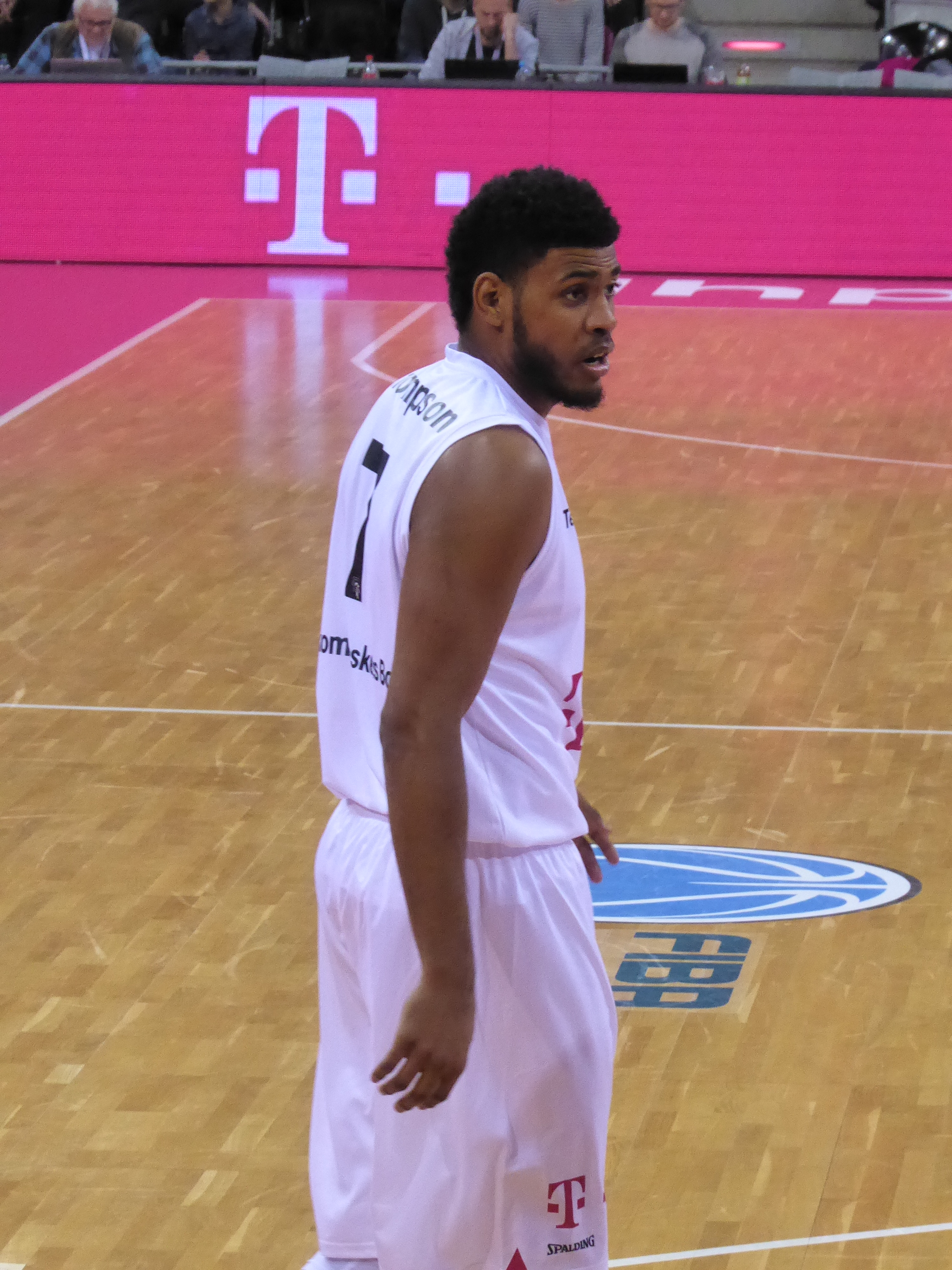
- Thompson with Bonn in 2016

Rider Broncs
- Title: Assistant coach
- League: Metro Atlantic Athletic Conference

Personal information
- Born: June 9, 1988 (age 38) Mount Laurel, New Jersey, U.S.
- Listed height: 6 ft 6 in (1.98 m)
- Listed weight: 212 lb (96 kg)

Career information
- High school: Lenape (Medford, New Jersey)
- College: Rider (2006–2010)
- NBA draft: 2010: undrafted
- Playing career: 2010–2020
- Position: Forward
- Coaching career: 2021–present

Career history

Playing
- 2010–2011: Utah Flash
- 2011–2012: Basket Brescia Leonessa
- 2012–2013: Generali Okapi Aalstar
- 2013–2014: Telenet Oostende
- 2014–2015: Brose Baskets
- 2015: Crvena zvezda
- 2016: Trabzonspor
- 2016–2017: Telekom Baskets Bonn
- 2017–2019: Ratiopharm Ulm
- 2019–2020: Hapoel Holon

Coaching
- 2021–2026: Rowan (assistant)
- 2026–present: Rider (assistant)

Career highlights
- Bundesliga champion (2015); All-Bundesliga Second Team (2015); Belgian League champion (2014); Belgian Cup winner (2014); 2× First-team All-MAAC (2009, 2010); Second-team All-MAAC (2008)
- Stats at Basketball Reference

Ryan Christopher Thompson (born June 9, 1988) is an American college basketball assistant coach for Rider University. He played college basketball for Rider before embarking on a professional career in the NBA D-League, Italy, Belgium, Germany, Serbia, Turkey and Israel.

== College career ==
Thompson played four seasons of college basketball at the Rider University, with the Rider Broncs, where he earned All-Metro Atlantic Athletic Conference (MAAC) honors three times, with selections to the All-MAAC First Team in his junior and senior seasons. He scored 1,879 career points to rank fourth on the school’s all-time list (through 2023–24) while he holds the program’s record with 188 career steals. Thompson is the only Rider player to be ranked in the school's top 10 in points, rebounds, and assists..

== Professional career ==
Thompson went undrafted in the 2010 NBA draft. For the 2010–11 season he played with the Utah Flash of the NBA Development League. On July 13, 2011, he signed with Basket Brescia Leonessa of the Italian Legadue Basket for the 2011–12 season.

In July 2012, he signed with Generali Okapi Aalstar of Belgium for the 2012–13 season. On July 15, 2013, he signed with Telenet Oostende. With Oostende he won the Belgian League and Belgian Cup in the 2013–14 season.

On July 8, 2014, he signed with Brose Baskets of Germany for the 2014–15 season. On August 25, 2015, he signed a one-year deal with Crvena zvezda. On December 28, 2015, he parted ways with Crvena zvezda after appearing in seventeen ABA league games and ten Euroleague games. The same day he signed with Trabzonspor for the rest of the season.

On July 13, 2016, he signed with German club Telekom Baskets Bonn for the 2016–17 season. On June 9, 2017, Thompson signed with German club ratiopharm Ulm. On July 28, 2019, Thompson signed with Hapoel Holon of the Israeli Premier League for the 2019–20 season.

== Coaching career ==
Thompson joined Rowan University's men's basketball coaching staff as an assistant coach prior to the 2021–22 season. In 2023 and 2024, he helped Rowan to reach the NCAA Division 3 National Tournament Sweet 16. In 2026, he was named assistant coach at Rider University.

== Career statistics ==
Legend
GP	Games played	GS	Games started	MPG	Minutes per game
FG%	Field-goal percentage	3P%	3-point field-goal percentage	FT%	Free-throw percentage
RPG	Rebounds per game	APG	Assists per game	SPG	Steals per game
BPG	Blocks per game	PPG	Points per game	PIR	Performance index rating
**Bold**	Career high

=== Euroleague ===
Year	Team	GP	GS	MPG	FG%	3P%	FT%	RPG	APG	SPG	BPG	PPG	PIR
2015–16	Crvena zvezda	10	6	19.5	.373	.190	.667	1.6	.9	.5	.1	4.8	1.7
**Career**		10	6	19.5	.373	.190	.667	1.6	.9	.5	.1	4.8	1.7

== Personal life ==
Thompson is the younger brother of former NBA player Jason Thompson.
