= Arena Ulm/Neu-Ulm =

Indoor arena in Neu-Ulm, Germany

Coordinates: 48°22′54.6″N 10°00′17.3″E

Ratiopharm Arena

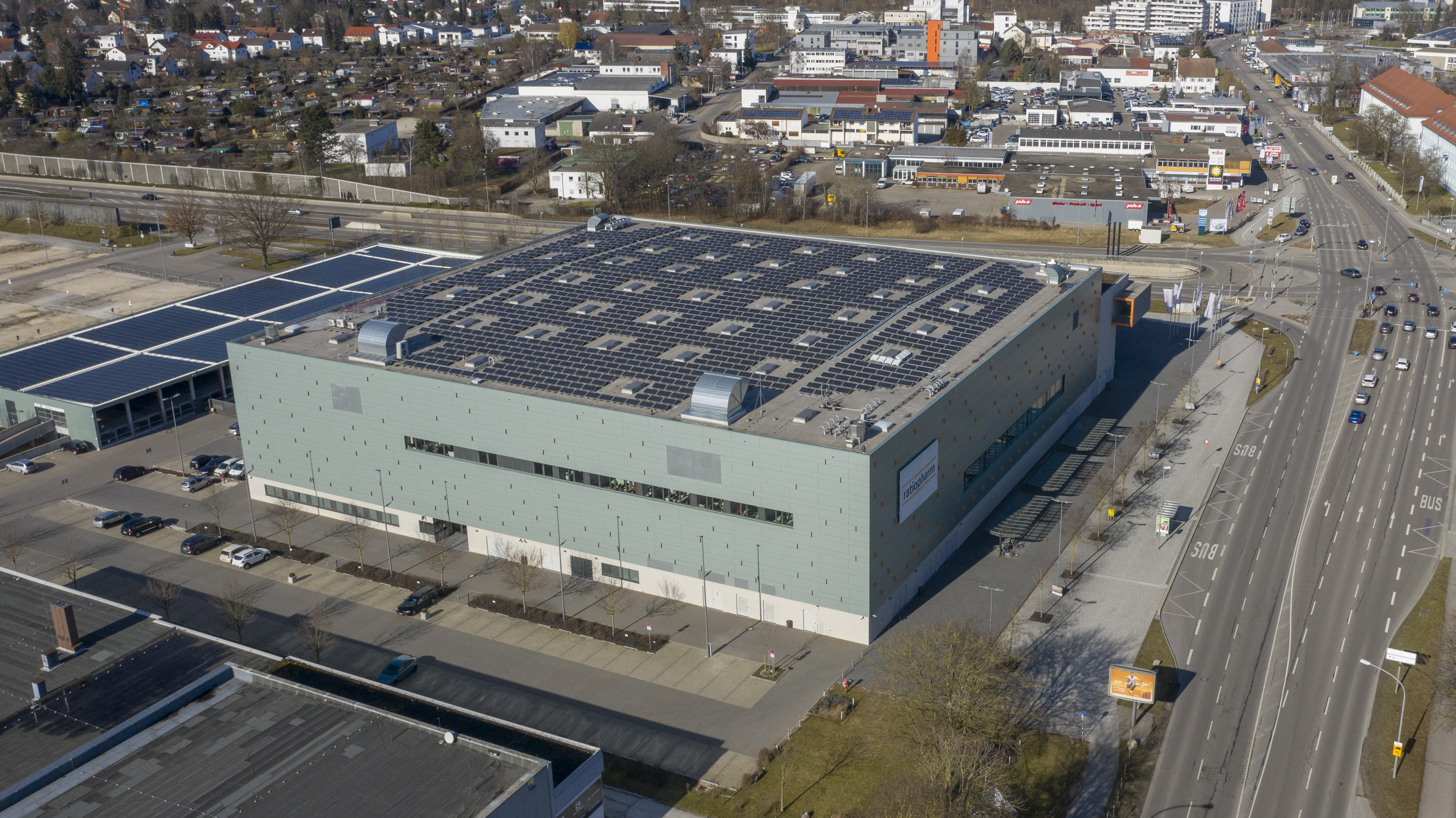
- Interactive map of Ratiopharm Arena
- Location: Neu-Ulm, Bavaria; Germany
- Owner: Multifunktionshalle Ulm/Neu-Ulm GmbH
- Operator: Arena Ulm/Neu-Ulm Betriebsgesellschaft mbH
- Capacity: 6,100 (Basketball); 6,100 (Volleyball); 6,100 (Boxing); 5,500 (handball)

Construction
- Groundbreaking: March 2010
- Opened: December 2011
- Cost: € 27,6 million
- Architect: Max Bögl

Tenant
- Ratiopharm Ulm (BBL) (2012–present)

The Arena Ulm/Neu-Ulm, known for sponsorship reasons as Ratiopharm Arena, is an indoor arena in Neu-Ulm. It is the home arena of the basketball club Ratiopharm Ulm, and provides a seating capacity of 6,100 for basketball games. The result of a cooperation between the cities of Neu-Ulm and Ulm, the arena was opened in December 2011, and also hosts concerts and other events.

== Gallery ==
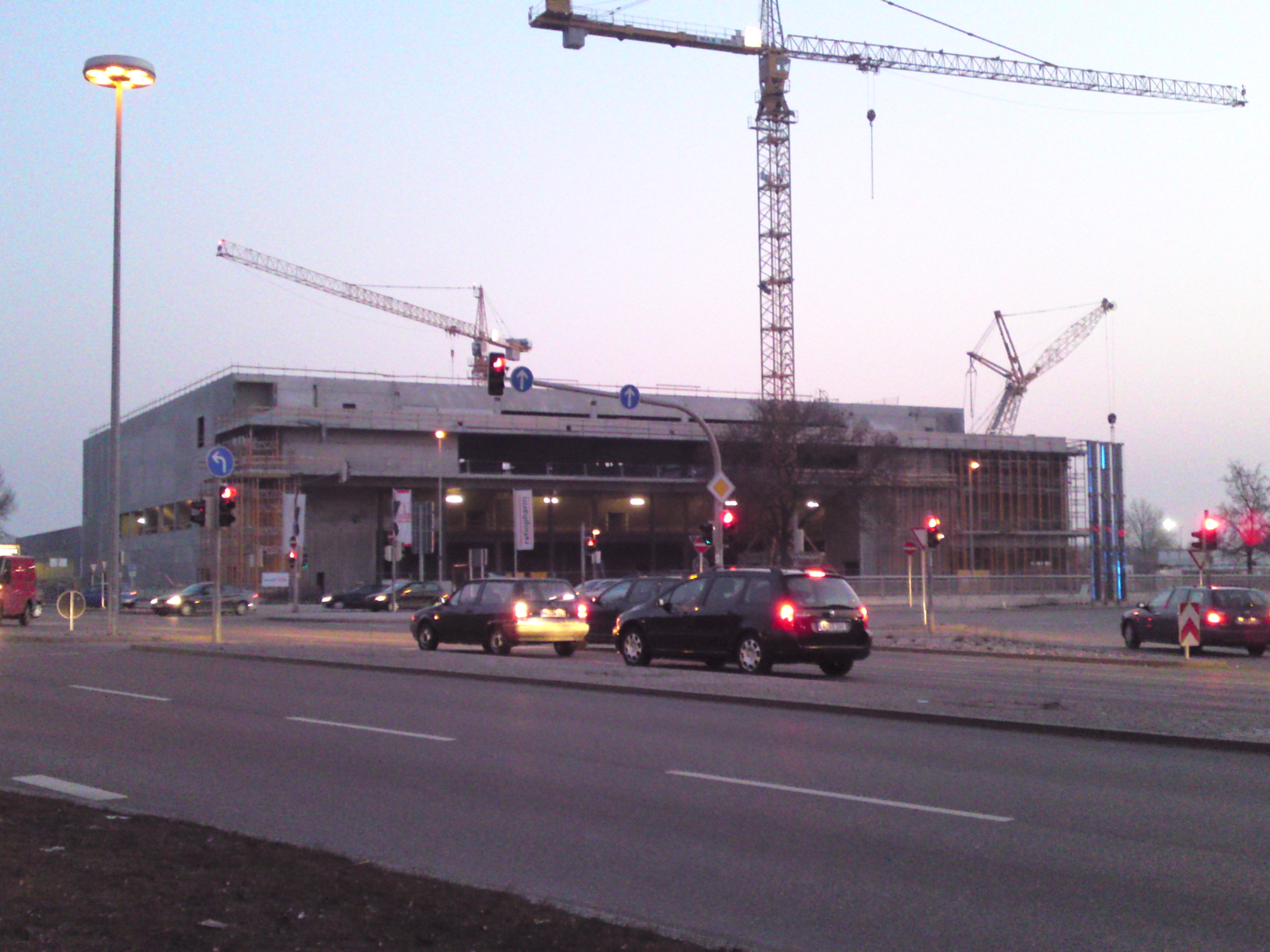
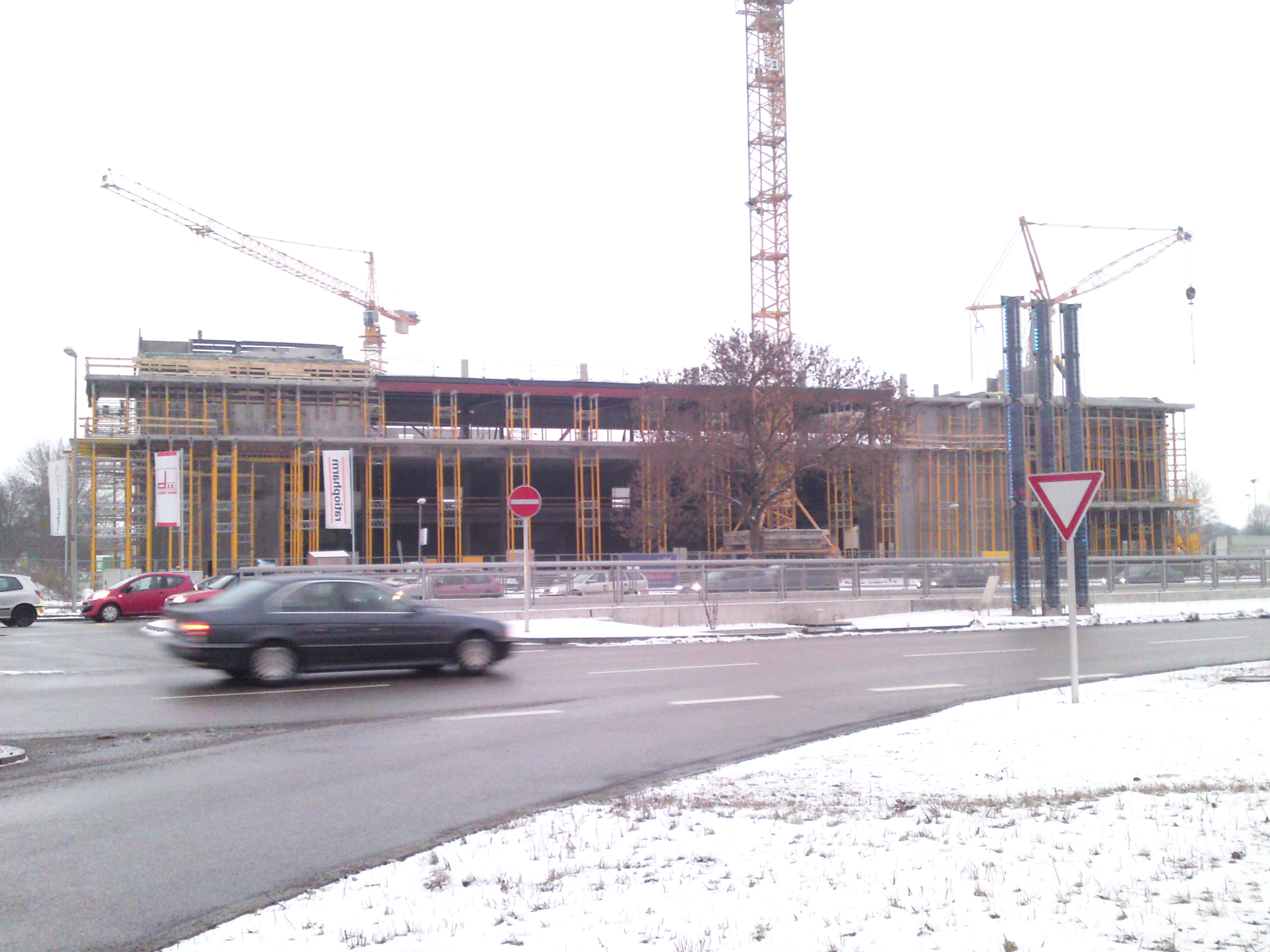
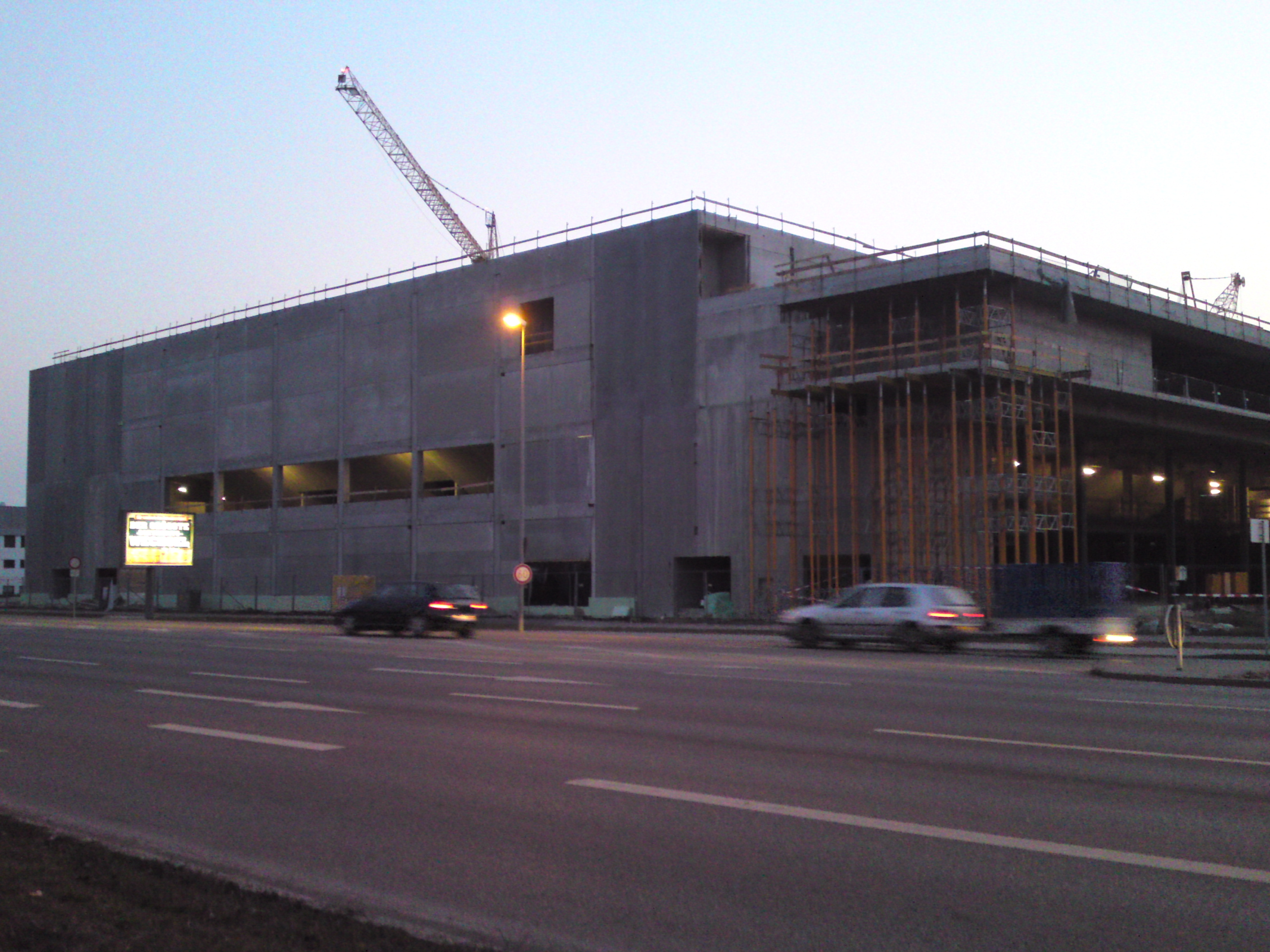
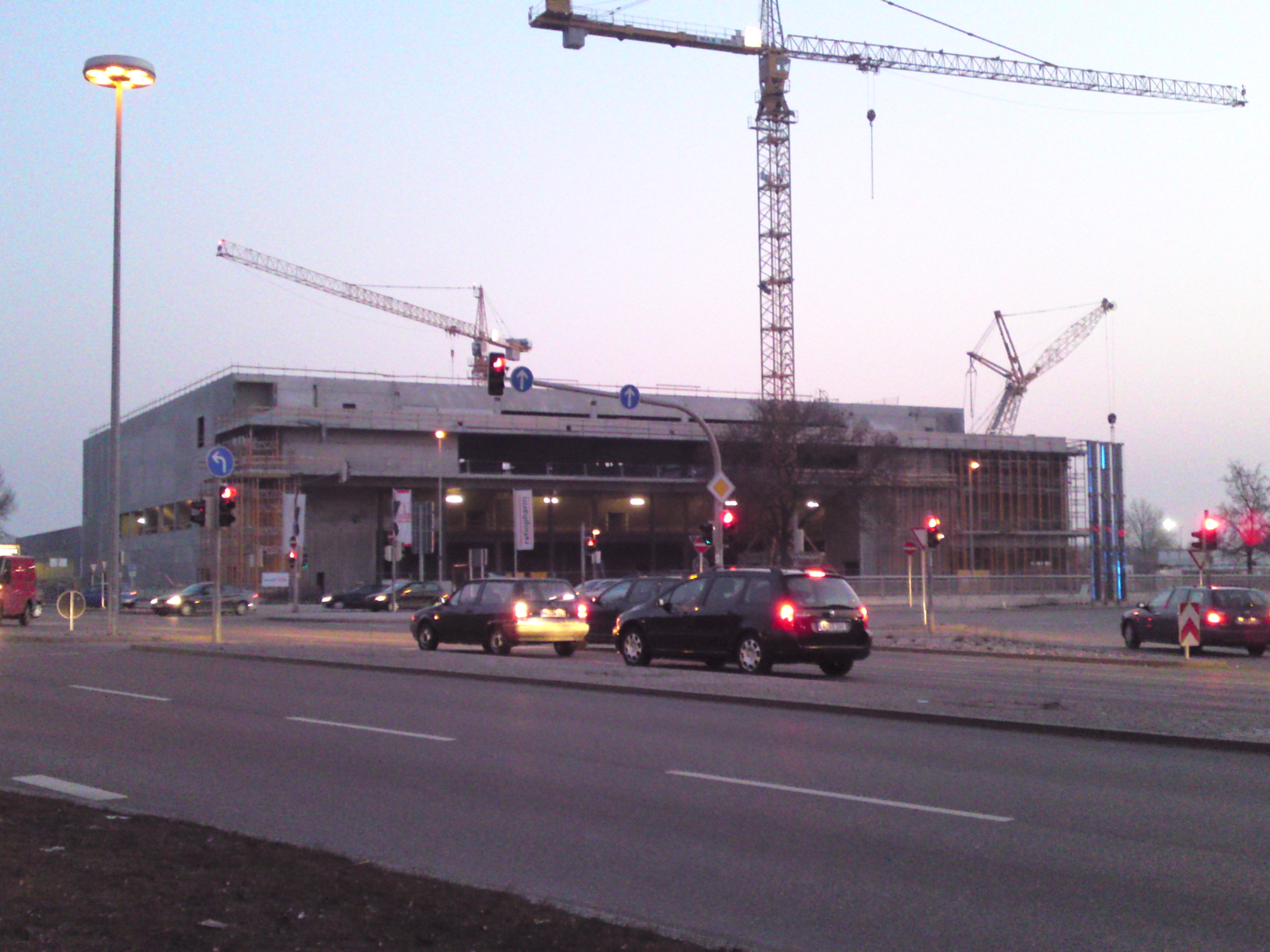
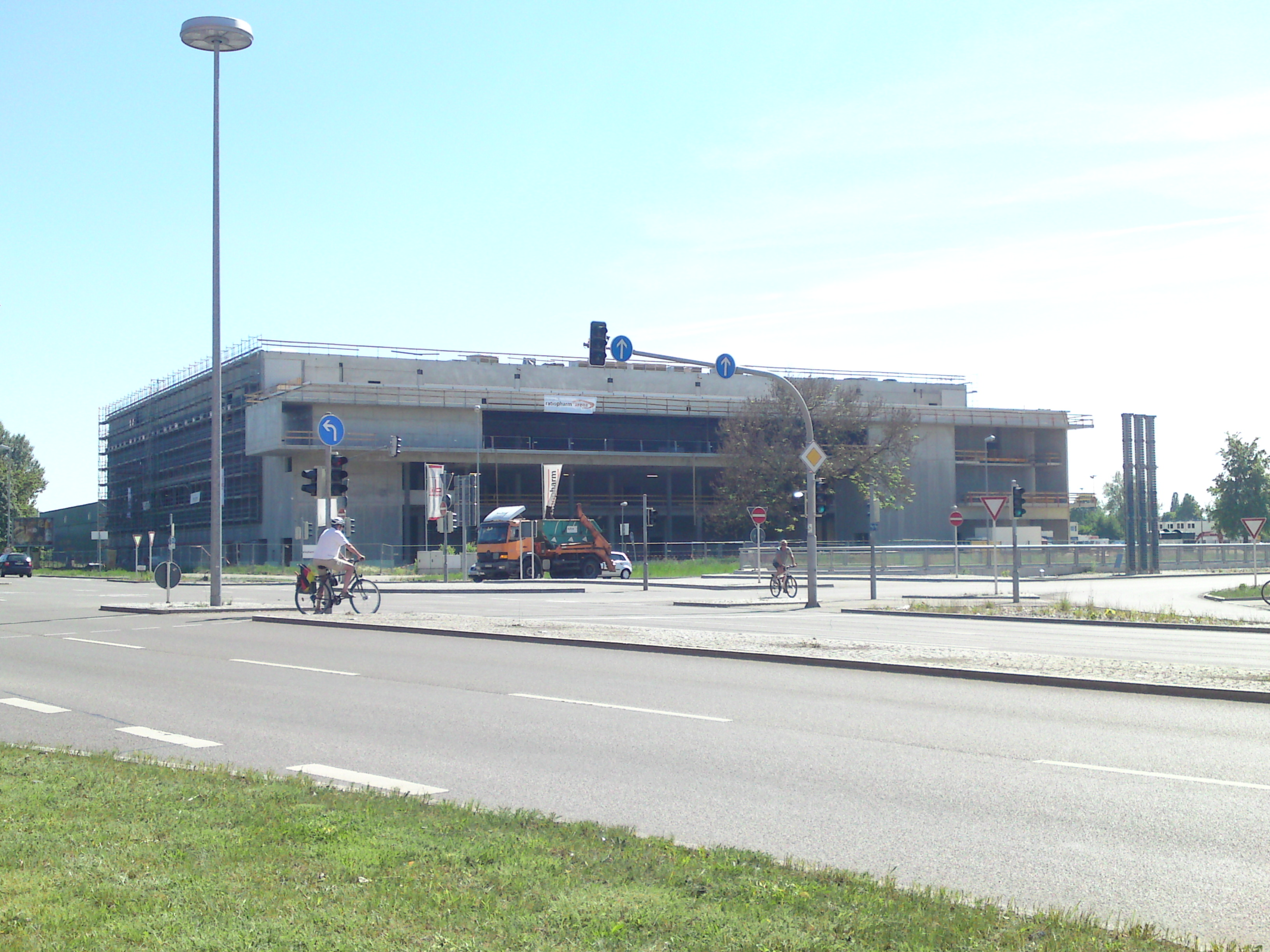
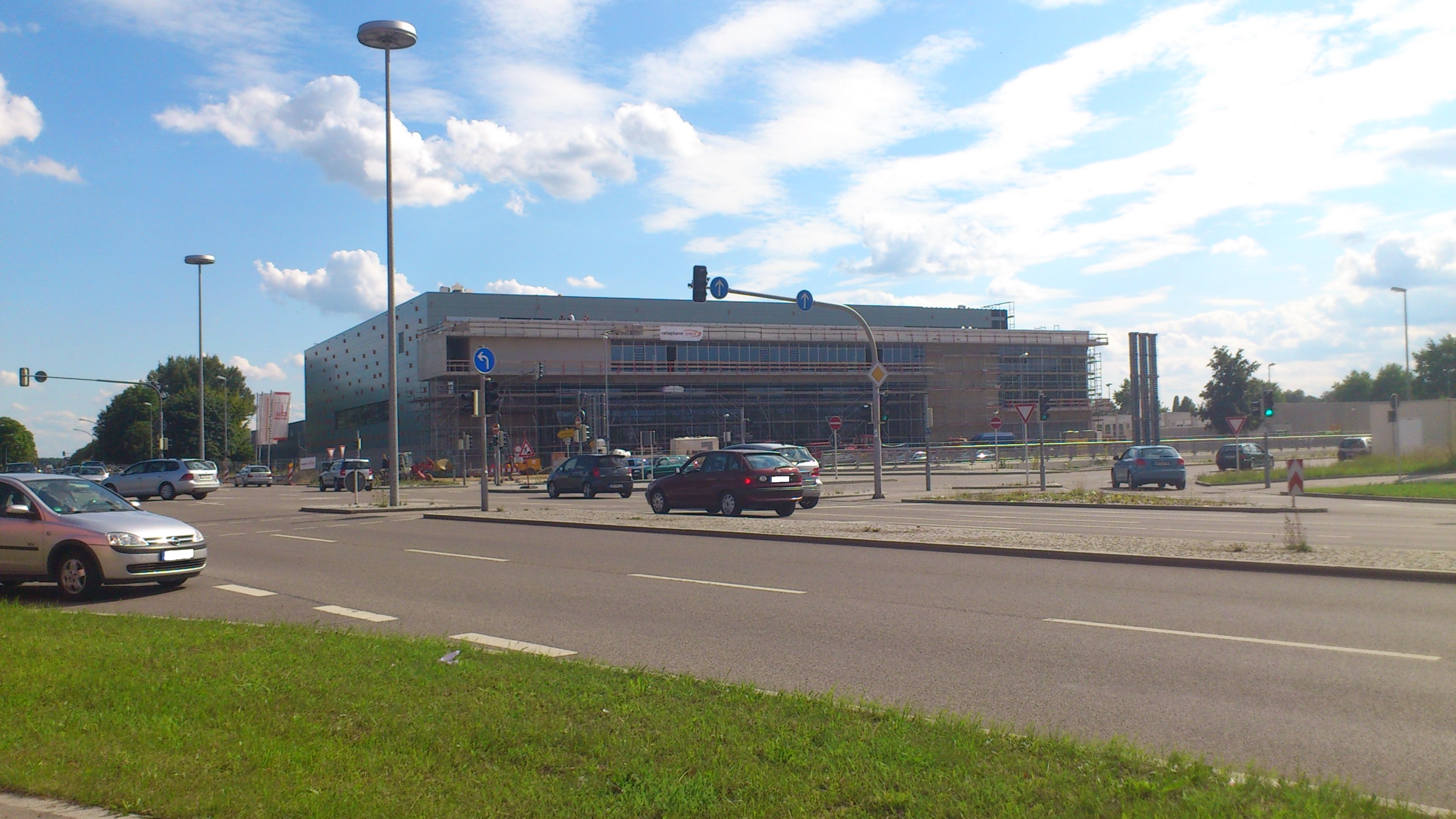
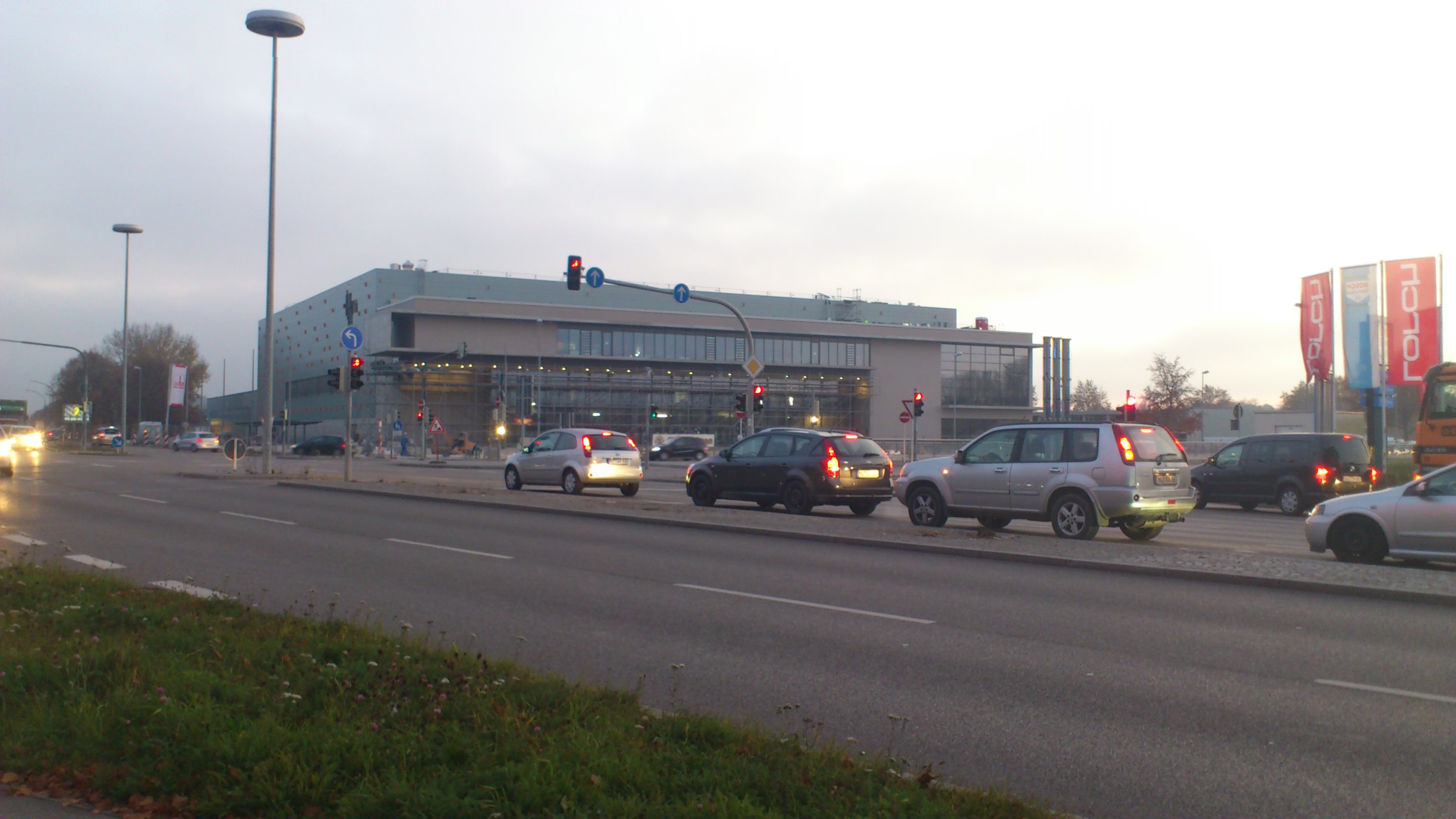
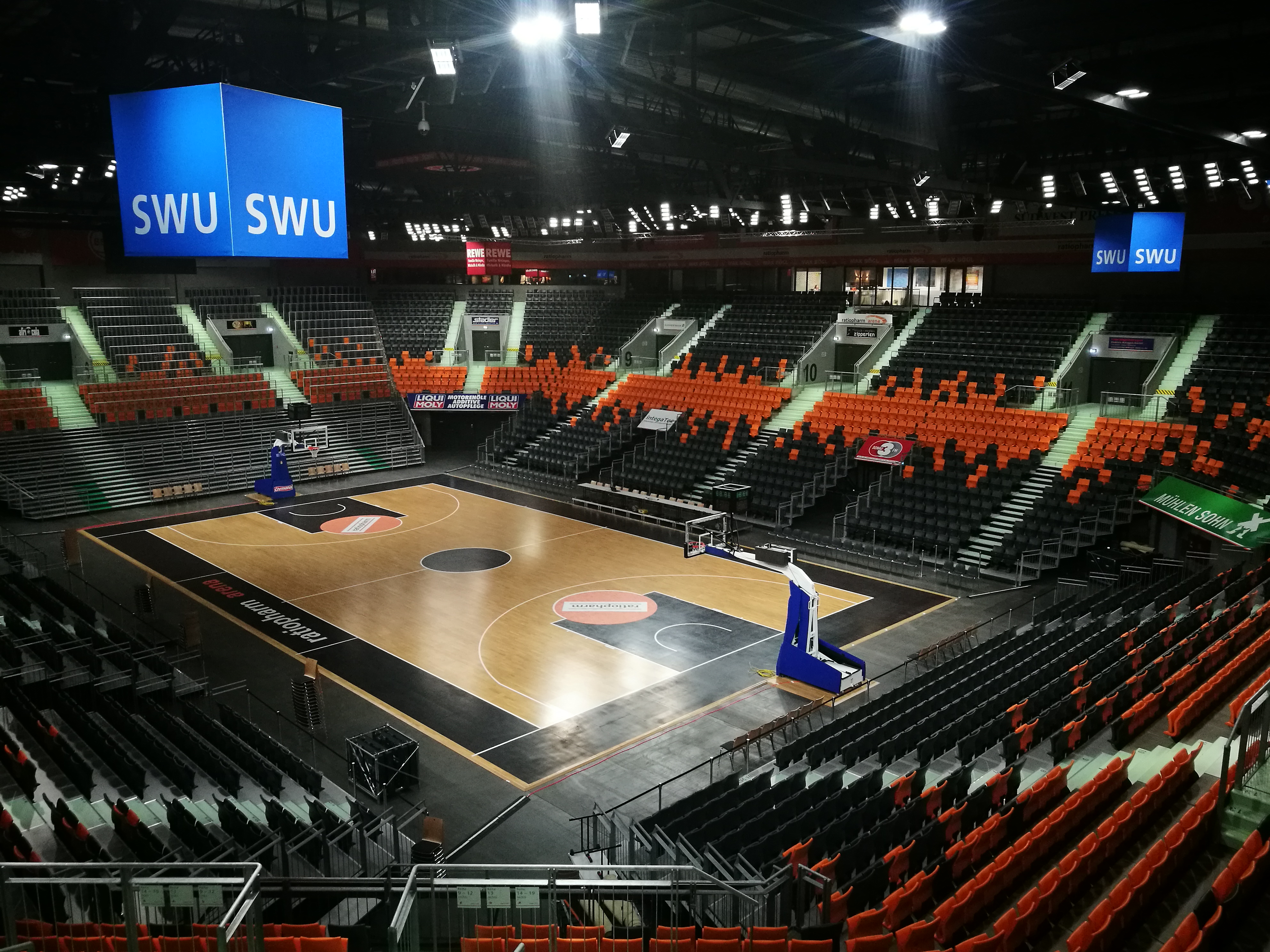
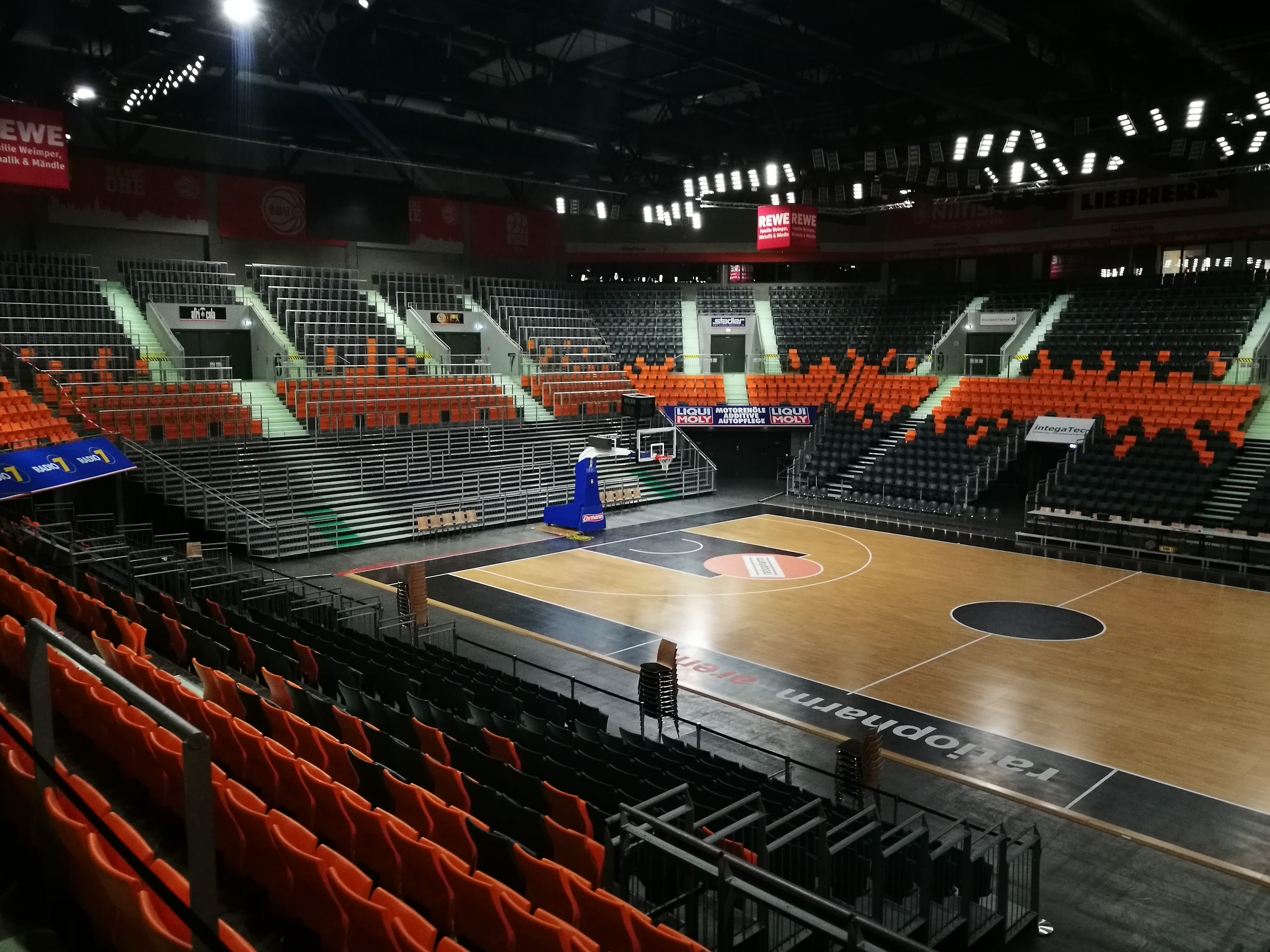
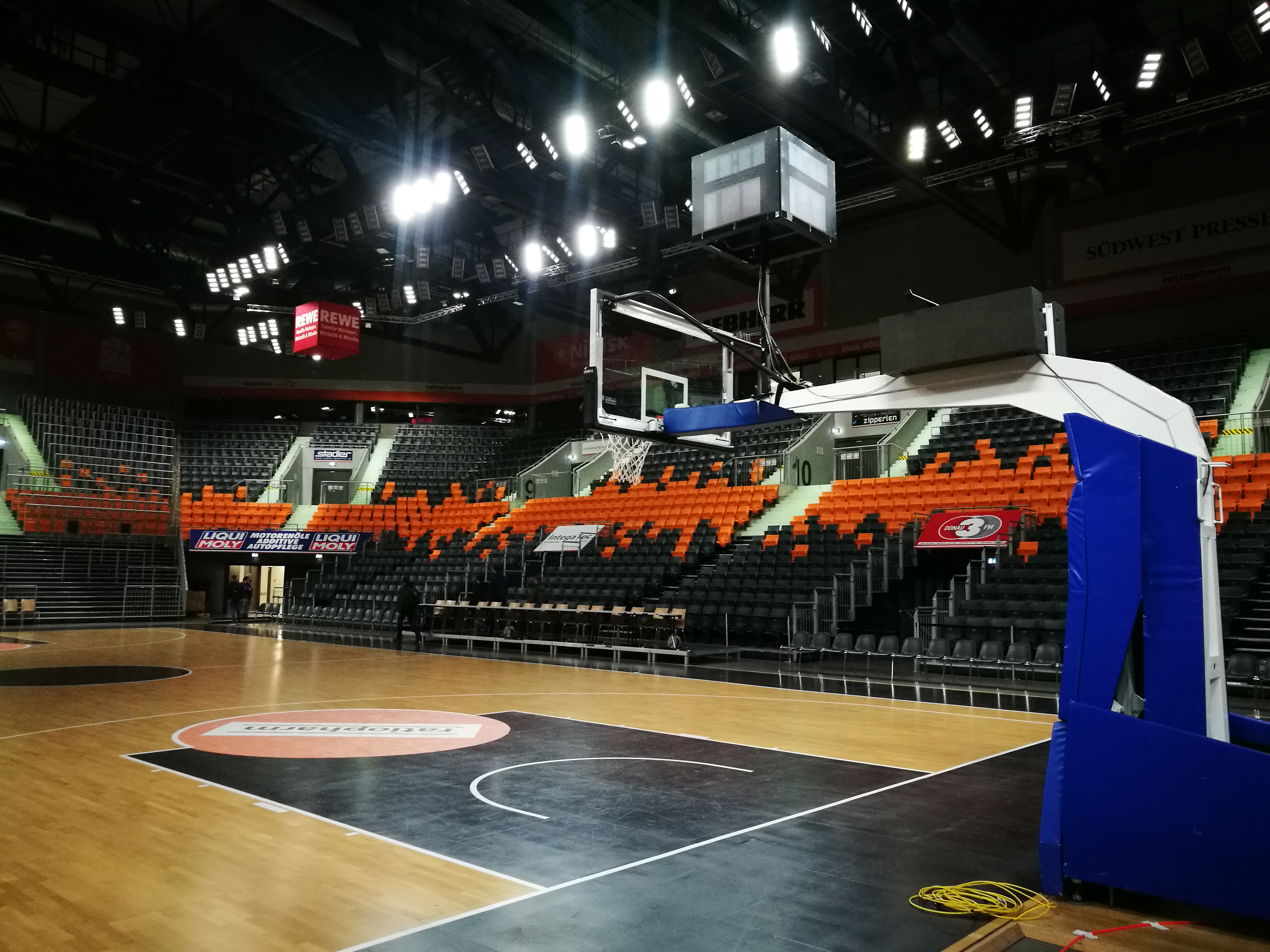
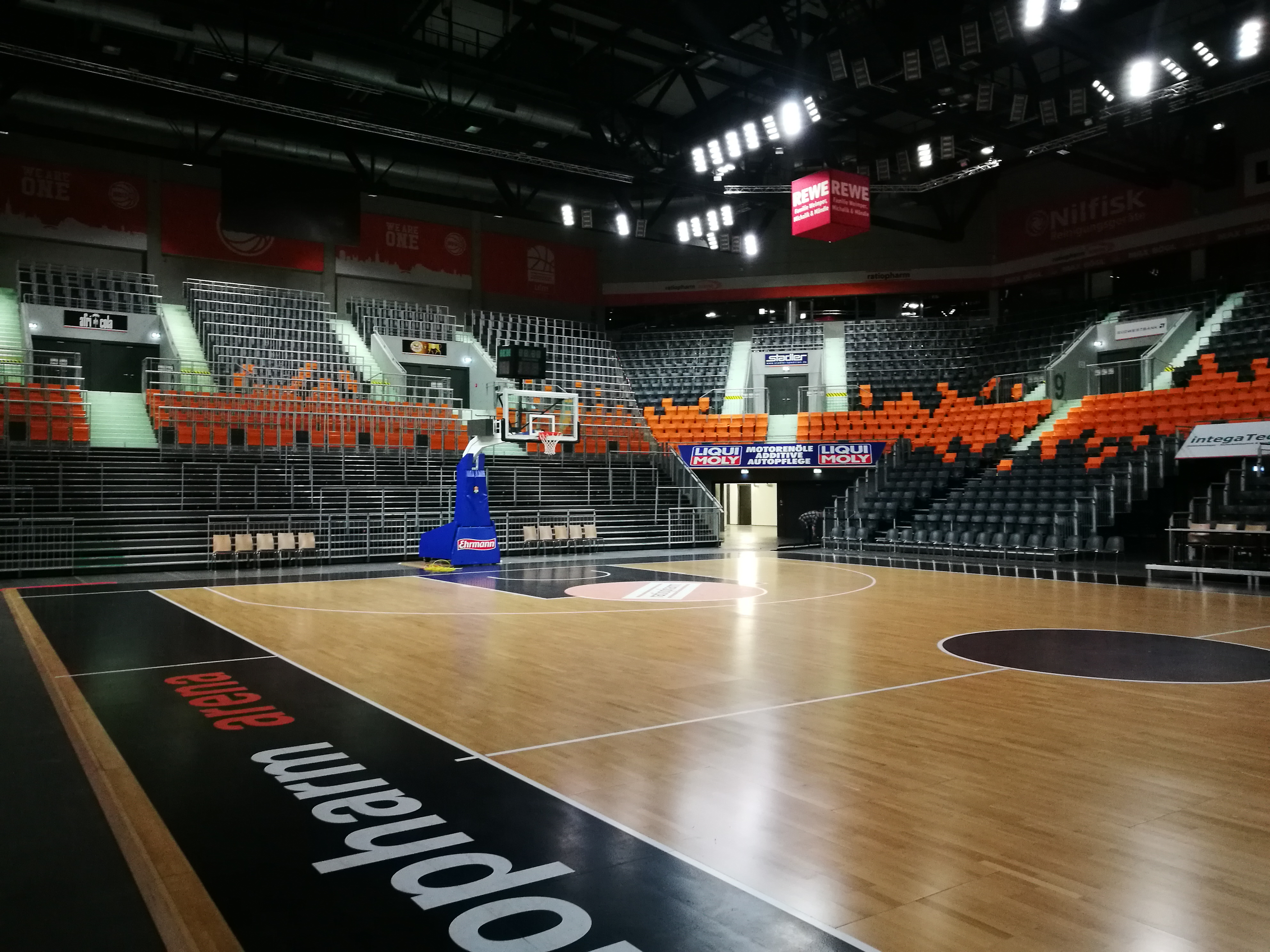

== See also ==
- List of indoor arenas in Germany
