= 2010–11 Euroleague qualifying rounds =

This page describes the qualifying rounds for the Turkish Airlines 2010–11 Euroleague.

The qualifying rounds consisted of three rounds, played in home and away series.

== Teams ==
Team	Domestic result in 2009–10
(France) ASVEL (Note: Wild Card.)	Regular season
(Russia) Khimki	Finalist
(Russia) UNICS	Semifinalist
(Serbia) Hemofarm Vršac (Note: Euroleague berth through Adriatic League.)	Finalist
(Czech Republic) ČEZ Nymburk	Champion
(Ukraine) Budivelnyk	Finalist
(France) Le Mans	Finalist
(Israel) Hapoel Gilboa Galil	Champion
(Greece) Maroussi	Semifinalist
(Belgium) Spirou Charleroi	Champion
(Germany) Alba Berlin	Quarterfinalist
(Italy) Pepsi Caserta	Semifinalist
(Montenegro) Budućnost	Champion
(France) Roanne	Semifinalist
(Turkey) Banvit	Semifinalist
(Netherlands) GasTerra Flames	Champion

== Draw ==
The draw was made on Thursday, July 8, 2010, at Barcelona, Spain. The draw began at 11:15 local time (CET) and determined the qualifying-round matchups and regular-season groups for the Euroleague, as well as the qualifying rounds for the Eurocup and the regular-season for the EuroChallenge.

Teams were organised into four pots of four teams. Teams of pot 1 faced teams of pot 4, while teams from pots 2 and 3 faced each other.

Pot 1	Pot 2	Pot 3	Pot 4
(Germany) Alba Berlin (France) ASVEL (Russia) Khimki (Russia) UNICS	(Serbia) Hemofarm Vršac (Czech Republic) ČEZ Nymburk (Ukraine) Budivelnyk (France) Le Mans	(Israel) Hapoel Gilboa Galil (Greece) Maroussi (Belgium) Spirou Charleroi (Turkey) Banvit	(Italy) Pepsi Caserta (Montenegro) Budućnost (France) Roanne (Netherlands) GasTerra Flames

=== Bracket ===
The higher ranked team hosted the second leg.

First qualifying round
1	(Germany) Alba Berlin	79	95	174
4	(France) Roanne	86	82	168
2	(Serbia) Hemofarm Vršac	97	77	174
3	(Israel) Hapoel Gilboa	84	86	170
1	(Russia) UNICS	84	78	162
4	(Netherlands) GasTerra Flames	72	63	135
2	(Czech Republic) ČEZ Nymburk	68	73	141
3	(Belgium) Spirou Charleroi	79	71	150

Second qualifying round
1	(Germany) Alba Berlin	73	73	146
2	(Serbia) Hemofarm Vršac	67	78	145
1	(Russia) UNICS	69	75	144
3	(Belgium) Spirou Charleroi	75	71	146

Third qualifying round
1	(Germany) Alba Berlin	77	70	147
3	(Belgium) Spirou Charleroi	81	70	151

First qualifying round
1	(France) ASVEL	64	84	148
4	(Montenegro) Budućnost	69	76	145
2	(France) Le Mans	78	78	156
3	(Turkey) Banvit	72	66	138
1	(Russia) Khimki	77	85	162
4	(Italy) Pepsi Caserta	74	66	140
2	(Ukraine) Budivelnyk	w/o
3	(Greece) Maroussi	DSQ

Second qualifying round
1	(France) ASVEL	75	71	146
2	(France) Le Mans	85	63	148
1	(Russia) Khimki	87	74	161
2	(Ukraine) Budivelnyk	58	67	125

Third qualifying round
2	(France) Le Mans	56	66	122
1	(Russia) Khimki	70	87	157

== First qualifying round ==
The first qualifying round had 16 teams playing in two-game series (home and away), the winners advanced to the second qualifying round. The losers of these two-game series will play in the 2010–11 Eurocup Regular Season.

=== First leg ===
September 21
20:30 CET

Report

Roanne (France)	86–79	(Germany) Alba Berlin
Scoring by quarter: 22–26, 24–17, 21–15, 19–21
Pts: Amagou 22; Rebs: Dunn 7 Asts: Diabate 3		Pts: Jenkins 18; Rebs: Dragićević 7 Asts: Dragićević 5

Halle André Vacheresse, Roanne
Attendance: 1,500
Referees: Lamonica (ITA), Lopes (POR) & Geller (BEL)

September 21
19:00 CET

Report

Hapoel Gilboa Galil (Israel)	84–97	(Serbia) Hemofarm
Scoring by quarter: 16–26, 29–21, 27–20, 12–30
Pts: Wilkerson 20; Rebs: Lyons, Wilkerson 5 Asts: Mekel, Green 4		Pts: Mačvan 31; Rebs: Borisov 7 Asts: Abdul-Hamid 5

Nokia Arena, Tel Aviv
Attendance: 3,500
Referees: Cmikiewicz (POL), Zurapovic (BIH) & Zashchuck (UKR)

September 21
19:30 CET

Report

GasTerra Flames (Netherlands)	72–84	(Russia) UNICS
Scoring by quarter: 16–21, 29–27, 10–22, 17–14
Pts: Haryasz 25; Rebs: Haryasz 9 Asts: Roijé 7		Pts: Lampe 26; Rebs: Lampe 13; Asts: Popović 5

Martiniplaza, Groningen
Attendance: 2,340
Referees: Herceg (CRO), Bissang (FRA), Silva (POR)

September 21
20:30 CET

Report

Spirou Charleroi (Belgium)	79–68	(Czech Republic) ČEZ Nymburk
Scoring by quarter: 23–14, 14–21, 22–12, 20–21
Pts: Gomis 18; Rebs: Riddick 9 Asts: four players 3		Pts: Efejuku 19; Rebs: Benda 6 Asts: Benda 4

Spiroudome, Charleroi
Attendance: 4,200
Referees: Rocha (POR), Mantyla (FIN), Bardera (FRA)

September 21
20:30 CET

Report

Budućnost (Montenegro)	69–64	(France) ASVEL
Scoring by quarter: 22–12, 19–23, 15–15, 13–14
Pts: Dragičević 18; Rebs: Dragičević 7 Asts: Otašević, Kadžiulis 3		Pts: Vassallo 18; Rebs: Gelabale 7 Asts: Hammonds 5

Morača Sports Center, Podgorica
Attendance: 2,500
Referees: Boltauzer (SLO), Nuran (TUR)

September 21
19:00 CET

Report

Banvit (Turkey)	72–78	(France) Le Mans
Scoring by quarter: 17–20, 16–18, 20–22, 19–18
Pts: Ermiş 15; Rebs: Paçun 4 Asts: Edge 4		Pts: Batista 18; Rebs: Batista, Diot 5 Asts: Pellin 7

Abdi İpekçi Arena, Istanbul
Attendance: 700
Referees: Belošević (SRB), Tomov (BUL), Lo Guzzo (ITA)

September 21
20:30 CET

Report

Pepsi Caserta (Italy)	74–77	(Russia) Khimki
Scoring by quarter: 14–18, 24–16, 16–18, 20–25
Pts: Koszarek 16; Rebs: Jones 6 Asts: six players 1		Pts: Langford 19; Rebs: Eze 7 Asts: López 3

PalaMaggiò, Caserta
Attendance: 3,500
Referees: Pukl (SLO), Anastopoulos (GRE), Milojevik (MKD)

=== Second leg ===
September 24
20:00 CET

Report

Alba Berlin (Germany)	95–82	(France) Roanne
Scoring by quarter: 25–23, 23–21, 25–11, 22–27
Pts: Jenkins 23; Rebs: Dragićević, McElroy 5 Asts: Jenkins 5		Pts: Gordon, Rivers 18; Rebs: Nsonwu 8 Asts: Nsonwu 4

O_{2} World, Berlin
Attendance: 9,602
Referees: Cerebuch (ITA), Kalpakas (SWE), Laurinavičius (LTU)

September 24
18:00 CET

Report

Hemofarm Vršac (Serbia)	77–86	(Israel) Hapoel Gilboa Galil
Scoring by quarter: 19–29, 20–22, 15–13, 23–22
Pts: Mačvan 21; Rebs: Borisov 15; Asts: Pavković 4		Pts: McClinton 21; Rebs: Green 6 Asts: Mekel 9

Millennium Centar, Vršac
Attendance: 3,000
Referees: Zamojski (POL), Kowalski (POL), Lucis (LAT)

September 24

Report

UNICS (Russia)	78–63	(Netherlands) GasTerra Flames
Scoring by quarter: 17–16, 14–14, 22–17, 25–16
Pts: Popović 22; Rebs: Pashutin 6 Asts: Popović 5		Pts: Bostain 17; Rebs: Haryasz 9 Asts: Bauscher 3

Basket-Hall Arena, Kazan
Attendance: 4,000
Referees: Drabikobsky (UKR), Esteron (ISR), Bijedic (BIH)

September 24

Report

ČEZ Basketball (Czech Republic)	73–71	(Belgium) Spirou Charleroi
Scoring by quarter: 17–17, 24–21, 16–17, 16–16
Pts: Simmons 17; Rebs: Pumprla 7 Asts: Simmons 4		Pts: Gomis 16; Rebs: Wright 7 Asts: three players 2

ČEZ Arena, Pardubice
Attendance: 1,500
Referees: Radovic (CRO), Ozols (LAT), Dragojevic (MNE)

September 24

Report

ASVEL (France)	85–76 (OT)	(Montenegro) Budućnost
Scoring by quarter: 21–16, 12–9, 17–16, 20–24, Overtime: 15-11
Pts: Vassallo 20; Rebs: Jefferson 11; Asts: Hammonds 4		Pts: Šehović 17; Rebs: Simonović 7 Asts: Scekic 4

L'Astroballe, Villeurbanne
Attendance: 5,200
Referees: Christodoulou (GRE), Paternico (ITA), Reiter (GER)

September 24

Report

Le Mans (France)	78–66	(Turkey) Banvit
Scoring by quarter: 18–17, 20–16, 20–16, 20–17
Pts: Diot 18; Rebs: Koffi, Rupert 5 Asts: Pellin 7		Pts: Akpinar 18; Rebs: Golubović 12; Asts: three players 3

Antarès, Le Mans
Attendance: 4,900
Referees: Taurino (ITA), Lottermoser (GER), Rutesic (MNE)

September 24

Report

Khimki (Russia)	85–66	(Italy) Pepsi Caserta
Scoring by quarter: 20–19, 27–13, 15–20, 23–14
Pts: Eze 14; Rebs: Lončar, Planinić 4 Asts: Langford 6		Pts: Ere 28; Rebs: Jones 11; Asts: Koszarek 3

Basketball Center of Moscow Region, Khimki
Attendance: 4,000
Referees: Jungebrand (FIN), Koromilas (GRE), Chebyshev (UKR)

== Second qualifying round ==
The eight winners of the first qualifying round entered the second round. The first leg was played on September 28 and the second leg at 1 October 2010.

=== First leg ===
28 September
19:00 CET

Report

Budivelnyk (Ukraine)	58–87	(Russia) Khimki
Scoring by quarter: 10–21, 18–18, 15–24, 15–24
Pts: Spencer 14; Rebs: three players 4 Asts: Lukashov 4		Pts: Langford 16; Rebs: Planinić 5 Asts: Planinić 4

DS Meteor, Dnipropetrovsk
Attendance: 5,600
Referees: Zamojski (POL), Sutulovic (MNE), Vojinovic (SRB)

28 September
20:00 CET

Report

Alba Berlin (Germany)	73–67	(Serbia) Hemofarm Vršac
Scoring by quarter: 21–21, 22–12, 21–15, 9–19
Pts: Marinović 15; Rebs: Femerling 7 Asts: three players 3		Pts: Mačvan 16; Rebs: Mačvan 9 Asts: three players 4

O_{2} World, Berlin
Attendance: 8,196
Referees: Mitjana (ESP), Lovsyn (SVN), Sabetta (ITA)

28 September
20:30 CET

Report

Spirou Charleroi (Belgium)	75–69	(Russia) UNICS
Scoring by quarter: 15–7, 24–20, 14–19, 22–23
Pts: Wright 19; Rebs: Wright 10; Asts: Wright 5		Pts: Lampe 19; Rebs: McCarty 9 Asts: Popović 8

Spiroudome, Charleroi
Attendance: 3,500
Referees: Garcia Ortiz (ESP), Viator (FRA), Jovovic (CRO)

28 September
20:30 CET

Report

Le Mans (France)	85–75	(France) ASVEL
Scoring by quarter: 18–22, 22–16, 26–24, 19–13
Pts: Batista 18; Rebs: Covile 6 Asts: Acker 5		Pts: Vassallo 29; Rebs: Žižić 6 Asts: Lacombe, Hammonds 4

Antarès, Le Mans
Attendance: 4,050
Referees: Arteaga (ESP), Jovcic (SRB), Cicoria (ITA)

=== Second leg ===
1 October 2010
17:00 CET

Report

UNICS (Russia)	75–71	(Belgium) Spirou Charleroi
Scoring by quarter: 18–8, 17–18, 20–28, 20–17
Pts: Lampe 21; Rebs: McCarty 8 Asts: Popović, Samoylenko 4		Pts: Gomis 16; Rebs: Wright 12; Asts: three players 2

Basket-Hall Arena, Kazan
Attendance: 3,000
Referees: Ankarali (TUR), Biricik (TUR), Zashchuck (UKR)

1 October 2010
17:00 CET

Report

Khimki (Russia)	74–67	(Ukraine) Budivelnyk
Scoring by quarter: 21–18, 14–21, 19–14, 20–14
Pts: Langford 14; Rebs: Monia 6 Asts: Kelati 4		Pts: Anisimovas 16; Rebs: Wilson 6 Asts: Keys, Morley 5

Basketball Center of Moscow Region, Khimki
Attendance: 3,000
Referees: Facchini (ITA), Dozai (CRO), Juras (SRB)

1 October 2010
18:00 CET

Report

Hemofarm Vršac (Serbia)	78–73	(Germany) Alba Berlin
Scoring by quarter: 21–23, 16–17, 18–13, 23–20
Pts: Jordan 16; Rebs: Savović 6 Asts: Krstović, Borisov 3		Pts: Jenkins 22; Rebs: Idbihi 8 Asts: McElroy 4

Millennium Centar, Vršac
Attendance: 2,800
Referees: Christodoulou (GRE), Perea (ESP), Obradovic (BIH)

1 October 2010
20:30 CET

Report

ASVEL (France)	71–63	(France) Le Mans
Scoring by quarter: 14–12, 16–10, 19–13, 22–28
Pts: Jefferson 18; Rebs: Jefferson 13; Asts: Hammonds 6		Pts: Diot 18; Rebs: Dewar 5 Asts: four players 2

L'Astroballe, Villeurbanne
Attendance: 4,237
Referees: Arteaga (ESP), Conde (ESP), Sahin (ITA)

== Third qualifying round ==
The four winners of the second qualifying round entered the last qualifying round to determine the participants of the regular season.

=== First leg ===
5 October 2010

Report

Spirou Charleroi (Belgium)	81–77	(Germany) Alba Berlin
Scoring by quarter: 20–24, 15–13, 24–19, 22–21
Pts: Mallet 26; Rebs: Hill 5 Asts: Gomis, Mallet 3		Pts: Allen 20; Rebs: Allen 8 Asts: McElroy 6

Spiroudome, Charleroi
Attendance: 3,500
Referees: Martin (ESP), Zamojski (POL), Boltauzer (SVN)

5 October 2010

Report

Le Mans (France)	56–70	(Russia) Khimki
Scoring by quarter: 12–16, 18–16, 8–17, 18–21
Pts: three players 10; Rebs: Koffi, Batista 6 Asts: three players 3		Pts: Langford, Kelati 19; Rebs: Planinić 5 Asts: Fridzon 4

Antarès, Le Mans
Attendance: 4,540
Referees: Rocha (POR), Radovic (CRO), Teofili (ITA)

=== Second leg ===
8 October 2010
17:00 CET

Report

Khimki (Russia)	87–66	(France) Le Mans
Scoring by quarter: 24–15, 12–20, 28–16, 23–15
Pts: Kelati 17; Rebs: Fridzon, Lončar 4 Asts: three players 3		Pts: Covile, Koffi 15; Rebs: Koffi 6 Asts: Diot 4

Basketball Center of Moscow Region, Khimki
Attendance: 4,000
Referees: Pukl (SLO), Belosevic (SRB), Latisevs (LAT)

10 October 2010
17:00 CET

Report

Alba Berlin (Germany)	70–70	(Belgium) Spirou Charleroi
Scoring by quarter: 16–12, 18–17, 12–23, 24–18
Pts: Allen 20; Rebs: three players 6 Asts: Jenkins 6		Pts: Greene 17; Rebs: Riddick 9 Asts: Mallet 4

O_{2} World, Berlin
Attendance: 11,840
Referees: Jungebrand (FIN), Taurino (ITA), Vojinovic (SRB)
