= 2013–14 Basketball Bundesliga =

German basketball season

Basketball Bundesliga
- Season: "Beko BBL" 2013–14
- Duration: 3 October 2013 – 1 May 2014
- Games played: 34
- Teams: 18

Regular season
- Top seed: Bayern Munich
- Season MVP: (United States) Malcolm Delaney
- Relegated: S.Oliver Baskets; SC Rasta Vechta

Finals
- Champions: Bayern Munich; 3rd title
- Runners-up: Alba Berlin
- Semi-finalists: EWE Baskets Oldenburg; Artland Dragons
- Finals MVP: (United States) Malcolm Delaney

Awards
- Coach of the Year: (Croatia) Silvano Poropat
- Defensive Player: (United States) Cliff Hammonds
- Offensive Player: (Bulgaria) Darius Adams
- Best Young Player: (Germany) Daniel Theis
- Most Improved Player: (Germany) Danilo Barthel

Statistical leaders
Points	(Bulgaria) Darius Adams	18.0
Rebounds	(United States) Larry Gordon	7.6
Assists	(United States) Jared Jordan	7.8

Records
- Highest scoring: Ulm 102–108 Skyliners

Seasons
- ← 2012–13 2014–15 →
- All statistics correct as of 7 September 2014.

The Basketball Bundesliga 2013–14 was the 48th season of the Basketball Bundesliga. The regular season started on 3 October 2013 and ended on 1 May 2014. Bayern Munich won its third German title, by beating Alba Berlin 3–1 in the Finals. Bayern player Malcolm Delaney was named both MVP and Finals MVP of the season.

== Team information ==
BBL 2013–14 – Club Locations

Team	City	Arena	Capacity
Brose Baskets	Bamberg	Stechert Arena	6,800
Medi Bayreuth	Bayreuth	Oberfrankenhalle	4,000
Alba Berlin	Berlin	O_{2} World Berlin	14,500
Telekom Baskets Bonn	Bonn	Telekom Dome	6,000
New Yorker Phantoms Braunschweig	Braunschweig	Volkswagen Halle	6,100
Eisbären Bremerhaven	Bremerhaven	Bremerhaven Stadthalle	4,050
Fraport Skyliners	Frankfurt	Fraport Arena	5,002
SC Rasta Vechta	Vechta	RASTA Dome	3,140
Phoenix Hagen	Hagen	Enervie Arena	3,402
MHP Riesen Ludwigsburg	Ludwigsburg	MHPArena	5,300
Bayern Munich	Munich	Audi Dome	6,700
EWE Baskets Oldenburg	Oldenburg	Große EWE Arena	6,069
Artland Dragons	Quakenbrück	Artland-Arena	3,000
TBB Trier	Trier	Arena Trier	5,900
Walter Tigers Tübingen	Tübingen	Paul Horn-Arena	3,132
ratiopharm ulm	Ulm	Ratiopharm Arena	6,000
Mitteldeutscher BC	Weißenfels	Stadthalle Weißenfels	3,000
s.Oliver Baskets	Würzburg	s.Oliver Arena	3,140

== Standings ==
Pos	Team	Pld	W	L	PF	PA	PD	Qualification or relegation
1	Bayern Munich	34	29	5	2940	2512	+428	Playoffs
2	Brose Baskets	34	28	6	2720	2400	+320	Playoffs
3	Alba Berlin	34	27	7	2773	2375	+398	Playoffs
4	EWE Baskets Oldenburg	34	25	9	2775	2602	+173	Playoffs
5	Telekom Baskets Bonn	34	21	13	2697	2652	+45	Playoffs
6	ratiopharm Ulm	34	20	14	2814	2701	+113	Playoffs
7	Artland Dragons	34	20	14	2623	2629	−6	Playoffs
8	MHP Riesen Ludwigsburg	34	18	16	2695	2659	+36	Playoffs
9	Mitteldeutscher BC	34	16	18	2629	2747	−118	
10	Phoenix Hagen	34	15	19	2746	2898	−152	
11	Skyliners Frankfurt	34	14	20	2412	2512	−100	
12	Eisbären Bremerhaven	34	12	22	2598	2716	−118	
13	TBB Trier	34	12	22	2504	2635	−131	
14	Medi Bayreuth	34	11	23	2564	2699	−135	
15	New Yorker Phantoms Braunschweig	34	11	23	2591	2723	−132	
16	Tigers Tübingen	34	10	24	2550	2802	−252	
17	S.Oliver Baskets (Note: S.Oliver Baskets were deducted two points (one win) prior to the season.)	34	11	23	2492	2632	−140	Relegation to Pro A
18	SC Rasta Vechta	34	6	28	2603	2842	−239	Relegation to Pro A

== Results ==
Home \ Away	BAM	BAY	BER	BON	BRA	BRE	FRA	HAG	LUD	MUN	OLD	QUA	TRI	TÜB	ULM	VEC	WEI	WÜR
Bamberg		99–81	73–69	88–68	79–77	78–74	73–43	104–93	75–76	96–65	75–82	78–72	94–88	85–62	87–63	88–78	86–70	104–66
Bayreuth	68–69		59–81	98–106	73–49	67–77	74–67	90–71	80–95	51–75	65–78	75–78	80–61	68–53	78–88	82–70	77–83	90–77
Berlin	70–58	83–73		93–67	98–79	79–85	67–59	107–79	83–52	94–74	89–65	89–75	87–72	106–87	102–74	91–66	86–73	85–74
Bonn	69–83	83–71	60–59		81–77	74–54	105–86	77–88	82–87	84–79	64–71	66–86	80–63	90–92	96–83	66–69	89–78	76–87
Braunschweig	82–86	82–87	54–69	77–66		77–73	82–81	81–85	84–78	82–81	66–70	74–89	67–58	83–88	94–85	91–72	72–76	65–58
Bremerhaven	74–86	87–74	59–62	72–80	89–78		72–88	86–84	76–82	70–77	76–85	72–74	85–80	78–85	72–89	99–89	86–71	72–75
Frankfurt	54–64	64–72	54–68	67–89	79–53	72–65		82–79	78–90	67–62	63–72	89–74	67–56	70–71	71–67	70–67	64–66	89–78
Hagen	72–81	92–86	81–75	82–77	100–105	89–93	66–63		85–80	76–82	98–78	87–74	73–57	78–95	104–91	80–78	73–80	75–73
Ludwigsburg	69–80	73–61	89–77	73–79	79–77	83–75	77–76	90–71		71–95	86–90	71–74	77–81	78–68	86–82	86–72	81–51	77–62
Munich	84–74	103–70	72–80	96–84	96–92	94–57	97–65	91–73	92–67		95–62	86–91	72–60	105–68	87–70	93–74	106–81	98–84
Oldenburg	59–73	111–78	82–73	75–86	95–70	82–66	68–66	92–71	91–79	87–72		86–64	81–75	94–86	76–62	87–74	82–88	83–75
Quakenbrück	71–68	84–83	67–66	65–82	78–79	74–78	83–77	88–68	76–82	79–92	95–69		76–67	78–60	62–75	86–76	89–69	79–74
Trier	63–69	79–71	61–81	75–71	78–76	77–89	75–85	82–88	78–77	69–76	80–82	64–72		79–71	72–84	84–87	75–69	82–77
Tübingen	84–86	69–74	64–74	89–77	89–82	76–77	83–99	105–86	57–92	70–78	60–96	104–64	74–67		77–81	62–71	77–69	65–82
Ulm	72–59	92–74	87–92	74–77	81–79	89–70	102–108	105–90	104–99	59–70	77–88	75–73	79–84	92–55		86–67	79–75	89–76
Vechta	62–79	85–80	73–88	80–82	76–85	75–76	67–75	64–74	58–82	79–92	76–82	101–102	83–92	106–99	84–92		70–72	85–92
Weißenfels	71–82	66–90	61–85	66–90	71–71	89–83	87–57	76–70	96–93	90–97	99–87	71–76	80–84	80–82	66–98	87–84		86–82
Würzburg	49–61	71–62	67–75	72–81	75–55	77–63	79–86	69–58	86–95	60–79	78–70	69–63	63–82	105–74	80–81	52–61	73–89	

Legend: Blue = home team win; Yellow = draw; Red = away team win.

== Playoffs ==
=== Bracket ===
Quarterfinals
1	Bayern Munich	3
8	MHP Riesen Ludwigsburg	1
4	EWE Baskets Oldenburg	3
5	Telekom Baskets Bonn	2
2	Brose Baskets	1
7	Artland Dragons	3
3	ALBA Berlin	3
6	ratiopharm ulm	1

Semifinals
1	Bayern Munich	3
4	EWE Baskets Oldenburg	2
7	Artland Dragons	1
3	ALBA Berlin	3

Final
1	Bayern Munich	3
3	ALBA Berlin	1

=== Quarterfinals ===
The quarterfinals were played between 10 and 21 May 2014 in a Best-of-five mode.

==== Bayern Munich vs. MHP Riesen Ludwigsburg ====
10 May
19:30

Boxscore

Bayern Munich 101, MHP Riesen Ludwigsburg 57
Scoring by quarter: 23–16, 28–13, 34–11, 16–17
Pts: Bryce Taylor 20; Rebs: Yassin Idbihi 8 Asts: Malcolm Delaney 5	Pts: Keaton Grant 16; Rebs: Patrick Flomo 7 Asts: Michael Stockton 6

Audi Dome, Munich
Attendance: 6,209
Referees: Moritz Reiter, Konstantin Simonow, Enrico Streit

13 May
18:05

Boxscore

MHP Riesen Ludwigsburg 85, Bayern Munich 83
Scoring by quarter: 25–20, 21–13, 16–23, 23–27
Pts: Karl, Stockton 20; Rebs: Patrick Flomo 8 Asts: Michael Stockton 4	Pts: Nihad Đedović 23; Rebs: Bryce Taylor 7 Asts: Malcolm Delaney 6

Arena Ludwigsburg, Ludwigsburg
Attendance: 4,500
Referees: Boris Schmidt, Toni Rodriguez, Johannes Hack

15 May
20:00

Boxscore

Bayern Munich 104, MHP Riesen Ludwigsburg 82
Scoring by quarter: 23–18, 22–29, 36–11, 23–24
Pts: Malcolm Delaney 22; Rebs: Boris Savović 7 Asts: John Bryant 5	Pts: Calvin Harris 17; Rebs: Patrick Flomo 5 Asts: Takumi Ishizaki 4

Audi Dome, Munich
Attendance: 6,190
Referees: Markus Hesse, Christof Madinger, Johannes Hack

21 May
19:30

Boxscore

MHP Riesen Ludwigsburg 68, Bayern Munich 86
Scoring by quarter: 13–23, 9–22, 27–23, 19–18
Pts: Shawn Huff 15; Rebs: four players 4 Asts: Calvin Harris 3	Pts: Malcolm Delaney 25; Rebs: Delaney, Thompson 7 Asts: Malcolm Delaney 3
Munich wins series 3–1

Arena Ludwigsburg, Ludwigsburg
Attendance: 4,500

==== Brose Baskets vs. Artland Dragons ====
10 May
14:15

Boxscore

Brose Baskets 68, Artland Dragons 73
Scoring by quarter: 11–18, 20–21, 17–14, 20–20
Pts: D'or Fischer 14; Rebs: D'or Fischer 9 Asts: Jared Jordan 6	Pts: Brandon Thomas 24; Rebs: Anthony King 12; Asts: Graves, Holston 4

Brose Arena, Bamberg
Attendance: 6,800
Referees: Markus Hesse, Toni Rodriguez, Anne Panther

13 May
19:30

Boxscore

Artland Dragons 72, Brose Baskets 80
Scoring by quarter: 19–17, 23–20, 25–24, 5–19
Pts: Anthony King 21; Rebs: Anthony King 8 Asts: Antonio Graves 7	Pts: Anton Gavel 23; Rebs: D'or Fischer 6 Asts: Jared Jordan 7

Artland-Arena, Quakenbrück
Attendance: 3,000
Referees: Martin Matip, Nesa Kovačević, Mathias Rucht

15 May
19:30

Boxscore

Brose Baskets 75, Artland Dragons 77
Scoring by quarter: 27–25, 16–12, 21–20, 11–20
Pts: Sharrod Ford 14; Rebs: three players 5 Asts: Jared Jordan 7	Pts: David Holston 16; Rebs: Lawrence Hill 9 Asts: Anthony King 4

Brose Arena, Bamberg
Attendance: 6,800
Referees: Benjamin Barth, Oliver Krause, Konstantin Simonow

18 May
20:00

Boxscore

Artland Dragons 83, Brose Baskets 75
Scoring by quarter: 22–19, 17–16, 24–22, 20–18
Pts: David Holston 24; Rebs: Lawrence Hill 7 Asts: Antonio Graves 5	Pts: D'or Fischer 15; Rebs: Fischer, Sanders 7 Asts: Anton Gavel
Artland Dragons wins series 3–1

Artland-Arena, Quakenbrück
Attendance: 3,000
Referees: Markus Hesse, Toni Rodriguez, Steffen Neubecker

==== ALBA Berlin vs. ratiopharm Ulm ====
10 May
19:30

Boxscore

ALBA Berlin 86, ratiopharm Ulm 66
Scoring by quarter: 21–24, 16–17, 25–15, 24–10
Pts: Reggie Redding 14; Rebs: Jan Jagla 12; Asts: Cliff Hammonds 7	Pts: Per Günther 14; Rebs: Daniel Theis 9 Asts: Per Günther 5

O_{2} World, Berlin
Attendance: 8,155
Referees: Clemens Fritz, Benjamin Barth, Johannes Hack

13 May
19:30

Boxscore

ratiopharm Ulm 89, ALBA Berlin 90
Scoring by quarter: 21–18, 23–22, 25–30, 20–20
Pts: Matt Howard 18; Rebs: Matt Howard 9 Asts: Per Günther 7	Pts: Levon Kendall 23; Rebs: Reggie Redding 6 Asts: Cliff Hammonds 8

Arena Ulm/Neu-Ulm, Ulm
Attendance: 6,000
Referees: Robert Lottermoser, Christof Madinger, Steffen Neubecker

15 May
20:00

Boxscore

ALBA Berlin 64, ratiopharm Ulm 71
Scoring by quarter: 15–17, 18–22, 15–18, 16–14
Pts: Levon Kendall 18; Rebs: Jan Jagla 8 Asts: Jan Jagla 4	Pts: Daniel Theis 20; Rebs: Daniel Theis 12; Asts: Günther, Long 3
Berlin leads series 2–1

O_{2} World, Berlin
Attendance: 9,326
Referees: Boris Schmidt, Steffen Neubecker, Anne Panther

17 May
19:00

Boxscore

ratiopharm Ulm 89, ALBA Berlin 95
Scoring by quarter: 19–21, 22–21, 21–31, 27–22
Pts: Daniel Theis 26; Rebs: Daniel Theis 8 Asts: Édgar Sosa 7	Pts: David Logan 23; Rebs: Hammonds, Jagla 7 Asts: Reggie Redding 6
Berlin wins series 3–1

Arena Ulm/Neu-Ulm, Ulm
Attendance: 6,000
Referees: Clemens Fritz, Nesa Kovačević, Oliver Krause

==== EWE Baskets Oldenburg vs. Telekom Baskets Bonn ====
10 May
20:00

Boxscore

EWE Baskets Oldenburg 69, Telekom Baskets Bonn 63
Scoring by quarter: 14–18, 17–20, 13–15, 25–10
Pts: Chris Kramer 18; Rebs: Kramer, Chubb 7 Asts: Chris Kramer 4	Pts: Lawrence, Gaffney 11; Rebs: Jamel McLean 9 Asts: Eugene Lawrence 5

Große EWE Arena, Oldenburg
Attendance: 5,820
Referees: Robert Lottermoser, Andreas Schreiner, Jonas Reiter

13 May
19:30

Boxscore

Telekom Baskets Bonn 72, EWE Baskets Oldenburg 61
Scoring by quarter: 21–12, 14–13, 15–18, 22–18
Pts: Jamel McLean 18; Rebs: Jamel McLean 13; Asts: Eugene Lawrence 8	Pts: Julius Jenkins 14; Rebs: Rickey Paulding 9 Asts: Chris Kramer 4

Telekom Dome, Bonn
Attendance: 5,890
Referees: Moritz Reiter, Oliver Krause, Clemens Fritz

15 May
18:05

Boxscore

EWE Baskets Oldenburg 72, Telekom Baskets Bonn 71 (OT)
Scoring by quarter: 17–13, 11–23, 16–10, 19–17, Overtime: 9–8
Pts: Rickey Paulding 14; Rebs: Kramer, Chubb 8 Asts: Chris Kramer 6	Pts: Ryan Brooks 16; Rebs: Jamel McLean 9 Asts: Eugene Lawrence 5

Große EWE Arena, Oldenburg
Attendance: 5,670
Referees: Martin Matip, Nesa Kovačević, Mathias Rucht

18 May
19:30

Boxscore

Telekom Baskets Bonn 72, EWE Baskets Oldenburg 71 (OT)
Scoring by quarter: 16–27, 23–12, 10–5, 14–19, Overtime: 9–8
Pts: Eugene Lawrence 17; Rebs: Jamel McLean 15; Asts: Eugene Lawrence 6	Pts: Nemanja Aleksandrov 14; Rebs: Chris Kramer 8 Asts: Dru Joyce 8

Telekom Dome, Bonn
Attendance: 6,000
Referees: Boris Schmidt, Benjamin Barth, Christof Madinger

21 May
20:00

Boxscore

EWE Baskets Oldenburg 84, Telekom Baskets Bonn 72
Scoring by quarter: 20–9, 28–18, 20–18, 16–27
Pts: Julius Jenkins 16; Rebs: three players 7 Asts: Dru Joyce 6	Pts: Tony Gaffney 19; Rebs: Jamel McLean 9 Asts: Eugene Lawrence 6
Oldenburg wins series 3–2

Große EWE Arena, Oldenburg
Attendance: 6,000
Referees: Boris Schmidt, Markus Hesse, Nesa Kovačević

=== Semifinals ===
The semifinals were played between 25 May–5 June 2014 in a Best-of-five mode.

==== Bayern Munich vs. EWE Baskets Oldenburg ====
25 May
17:45

Boxscore

Bayern Munich 85, EWE Baskets Oldenburg 67
Scoring by quarter: 18–16, 28–19, 22–18, 17–14
Pts: Malcolm Delaney 22; Rebs: John Bryant 12; Asts: Heiko Schaffartzik 4	Pts: Julius Jenkins 16; Rebs: Julius Jenkins 8 Asts: Dru Joyce 4

Audi Dome, Munich
Attendance: 5,596
Referees: Boris Schmidt, Markus Hesse, Johannes Hack

28 May
19:00

Boxscore

EWE Baskets Oldenburg 72, Bayern Munich 74
Scoring by quarter: 21–14, 16–21, 17–15, 18–24
Pts: Adam Chubb 16; Rebs: Chubb, Kramer 5 Asts: Dru Joyce 5	Pts: Malcolm Delaney 16; Rebs: John Bryant 7 Asts: Malcolm Delaney 4

Große EWE Arena, Oldenburg
Attendance: 6,120
Referees: Moritz Reiter, Nesa Kovačević, Christof Madinger

31 May
17:45

Boxscore

Bayern Munich 103, EWE Baskets Oldenburg 105 (OT)
Scoring by quarter: 19–15, 25–29, 21–16, 18–23, Overtime: 20–22
Pts: Deon Thompson 20; Rebs: Deon Thompson 12; Asts: Heiko Schaffartzik 8	Pts: Rickey Paulding 25; Rebs: Adam Chubb 10; Asts: Dru Joyce 13

Audi Dome, Munich
Attendance: 6,700
Referees: Robert Lottermoser, Toni Rodriguez, Oliver Krause

3 June
20:30

Boxscore

EWE Baskets Oldenburg 70, Bayern Munich 60
Scoring by quarter: 10–16, 19–15, 25–7, 16–22
Pts: Julius Jenkins 20; Rebs: Philipp Neumann 7 Asts: Dru Joyce 2	Pts: Bryce Taylor 15; Rebs: John Bryant 9 Asts: Heiko Schaffartzik 5

Große EWE Arena, Oldenburg
Attendance: 6,000
Referees: Boris Schmidt, Markus Hesse, Christof Madinger

5 June
19:35

Boxscore

Bayern Munich 88, EWE Baskets Oldenburg 63
Scoring by quarter: 23–19, 18–14, 26–11, 21–19
Pts: Malcolm Delaney 17; Rebs: Savović, Thompson 7 Asts: Steffen Hamann 3	Pts: Julius Jenkins 20; Rebs: Aleksandrov, Chubb 5 Asts: three players 3
Munich wins series 3–2

Audi Dome, Munich
Attendance: 6,111
Referees: Robert Lottermoser, Moritz Reiter, Oliver Krause

==== ALBA Berlin vs. Artland Dragons ====
25 May
15:45

Boxscore

ALBA Berlin 81, Artland Dragons 79 (OT)
Scoring by quarter: 15–13, 29–21, 16–17, 12–21, Overtime: 9–7
Pts: Reggie Redding 19; Rebs: Levon Kendall 9 Asts: Reggie Redding 5	Pts: David Holston 20; Rebs: Anthony King 6 Asts: David Holston 6

O_{2} World, Berlin
Attendance: 9,644
Referees: Robert Lottermoser, Oliver Krause, Toni Rodriguez

28 May
21:00

Boxscore

Artland Dragons 91, ALBA Berlin 84
Scoring by quarter: 17–17, 20–27, 22–21, 32–19
Pts: Brandon Thomas 15; Rebs: King, Frease 6 Asts: Antonio Graves 9	Pts: Logan, Jagla 18; Rebs: Reggie Redding 9 Asts: Cliff Hammonds 5

Artland-Arena, Quakenbrück
Attendance: 3,000
Referees: Clemens Fritz, Benjamin Barth, Christof Madinger

1 June
18:35

Boxscore

ALBA Berlin 74, Artland Dragons 68
Scoring by quarter: 21–18, 20–17, 16–13, 17–20
Pts: Reggie Redding 17; Rebs: Kendall, Redding 7 Asts: Cliff Hammonds 5	Pts: Lawrence Hill 18; Rebs: Guido Grünheid 7 Asts: David Holston 3

O_{2} World, Berlin
Attendance: 11,122
Referees: Boris Schmidt, Moritz Reiter, Markus Hesse

3 June
19:30

Boxscore

Artland Dragons 61, ALBA Berlin 69
Scoring by quarter: 12–12, 17–24, 15–16, 17–17
Pts: Brandon Thomas 26; Rebs: Brandon Thomas 8 Asts: David Holston 7	Pts: Leon Radošević 11; Rebs: Levon Kendall 8 Asts: Levon Kendall 4
Berlin wins series 3–1

Artland-Arena, Quakenbrück
Attendance: 3,000
Referees: Robert Lottermoser, Toni Rodriguez, Nesa Kovačević

=== Final ===
The final was played between 8–22 June 2014 in a Best-of-five mode.

==== Bayern Munich vs. ALBA Berlin ====
8 June
16:15

Boxscore

Bayern Munich 88, ALBA Berlin 81
Scoring by quarter: 24–30, 20–9, 26–18, 18–24
Pts: Malcolm Delaney 16; Rebs: Deon Thompson 6 Asts: Malcolm Delaney 5	Pts: Reggie Redding 22; Rebs: Reggie Redding 7 Asts: Reggie Redding 4

Audi Dome, Munich
Attendance: 6,027
Referees: Boris Schmidt, Toni Rodriguez, Oliver Krause

12 June
18:15

Boxscore

ALBA Berlin 95, Bayern Munich 81
Scoring by quarter: 26–24, 28–25, 18–14, 23–18
Pts: Reggie Redding 16; Rebs: Redding, Jagla 5 Asts: Cliff Hammonds 7	Pts: Malcolm Delaney 24; Rebs: John Bryant 5 Asts: three players 2

O_{2} World, Berlin
Attendance: 12,588
Referees: Robert Lottermoser, Moritz Reiter, Nesa Kovačević

15 June
17:00

Boxscore

Bayern Munich 92, ALBA Berlin 86
Scoring by quarter: 20–20, 19–28, 27–18, 26–20
Pts: Malcolm Delaney 26; Rebs: Bryant, Delaney 7 Asts: Heiko Schaffartzik 4	Pts: Cliff Hammonds 15; Rebs: Leon Radošević 7 Asts: David Logan 3

Audi Dome, Munich
Attendance: 6,700
Referees: Robert Lottermoser, Toni Soriano, Nesa Kovačević

18 June
19:30

Boxscore

ALBA Berlin 62, Bayern Munich 75
Scoring by quarter: 15–13, 15–20, 18–20, 14–22
Pts: Leon Radošević 21; Rebs: Levon Kendall 7 Asts: Hammonds, Stojanovski 4	Pts: Deon Thompson 18; Rebs: Bryce Taylor 9 Asts: Heiko Schaffartzik 3
Munich wins series 3–1

O_{2} World, Berlin
Referees: Robert Lottermoser, Boris Schmidt, Moritz Reiter

== Awards ==
- Most Valuable Player: (United States) Malcolm Delaney (Bayern Munich)
- Finals MVP: (United States) Malcolm Delaney (Bayern Munich)
- Best German Young Player: (Germany) Daniel Theis (ratiopharm ulm)
- Coach of the Year: (Croatia) Silvano Poropat (Mitteldeutscher BC)
- Most Improved Player: (Germany) Danilo Barthel (Fraport Skyliners)
- Best Offensive Player: (Bulgaria) Darius Adams (Eisbären Bremerhaven)
- Best Defensive Player: (United States) Cliff Hammonds (ALBA Berlin)

- All-BBL First Team:
  - (United States) Malcolm Delaney (Bayern Munich)
  - (Germany) Anton Gavel (Brose Baskets)
  - (United States) Reggie Redding (ALBA Berlin)
  - (Italy) Angelo Caloiaro (Mitteldeutscher BC)
  - (Israel) D'or Fischer (Brose Baskets)
- All-BBL Second Team:
  - (United States) Jared Jordan (Brose Baskets)
  - (United States) Julius Jenkins (EWE Baskets Oldenburg)
  - (United States) Bryce Taylor (Bayern Munich)
  - (United States) Deon Thompson (Bayern Munich)
  - (Croatia) Leon Radošević (ALBA Berlin)

== Statistical leaders ==
Points

Rank	Player	Team	Total	PPG
1	(Bulgaria) Darius Adams	Eisbären Bremerhaven	613	18.0
2	(United States) Isaiah Swann	NY Phantoms Braunschweig	610	17.9
3	(Canada) Andrew Rautins	Fraport Skyliners	264	17.6
4	(United States) Keaton Grant	MHP Riesen Ludwigsburg	518	16.2
5	(United States) David Bell	Phoenix Hagen	549	16.1

Rebounds

Rank	Player	Team	Total	RPG
1	(United States) Larry Gordon	Phoenix Hagen	258	7.6
2	(United States) Jamel McLean	Telekom Baskets Bonn	238	7.2
3	(United States) Devin Searcy	Eisbären Bremerhaven	216	6.8
4	(United States) Dane Watts	Fraport Skyliners	27	6.8
5	(Italy) Angelo Caloiaro	Mitteldeutscher BC	232	6.8

Assists

Rank	Player	Team	Total	APG
1	(United States) Jared Jordan	Telekom Baskets Bonn	179	7.8
2	(United States) Eugene Lawrence	Telekom Baskets Bonn	66	6.0
3	(United States) Kevin Hamilton	Medi Bayreuth	178	5.7
4	(Serbia) Branislav Ratkovica	WALTER Tigers Tübingen	147	5.4
5	(United States) Marcus Hatten	Mitteldeutscher BC	124	5.0
