= Basketball Bundesliga Coach of the Year =

German basketball award

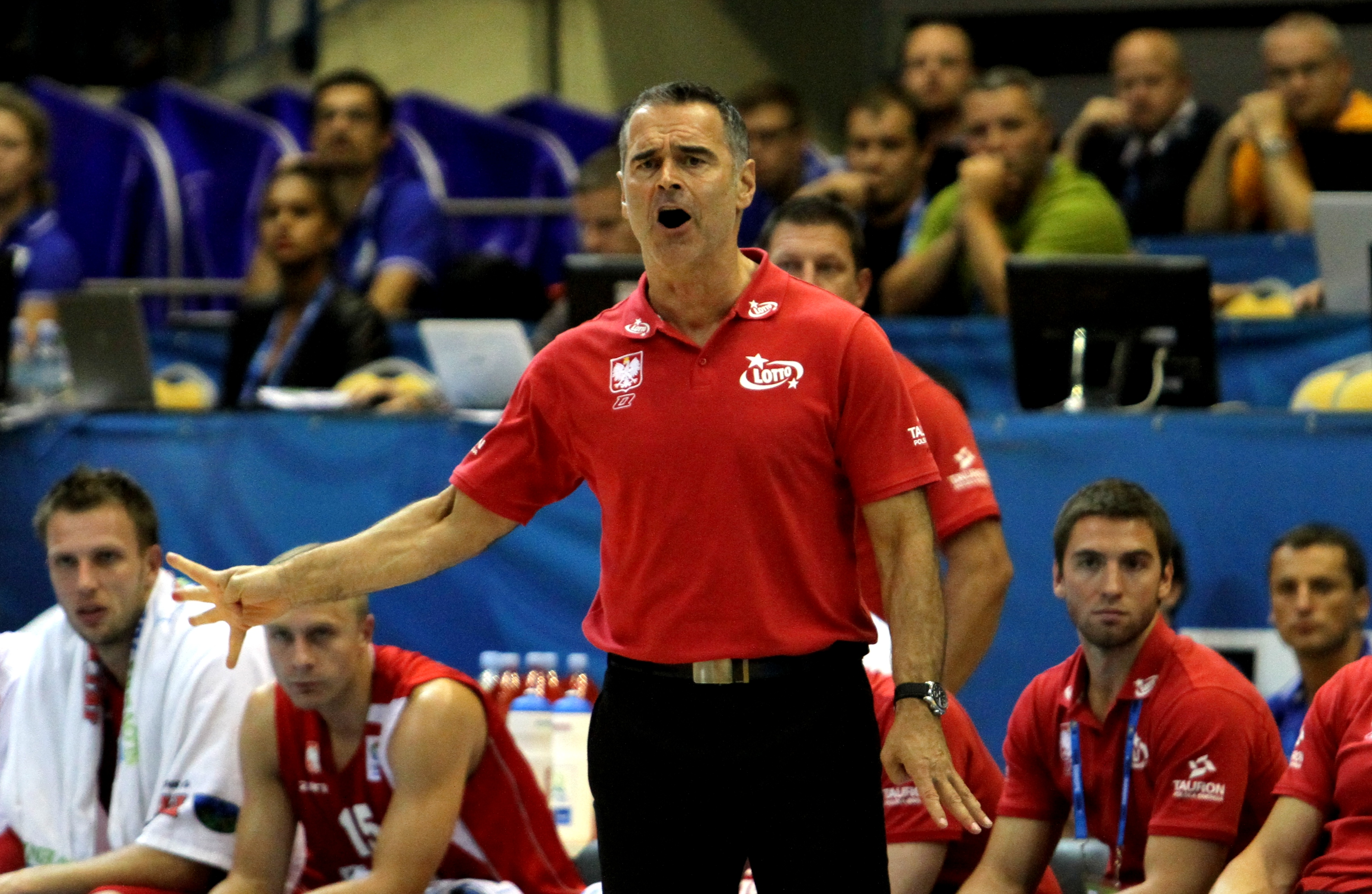
Dirk Bauermann was a 4 time Basketball Bundesliga Coach of the Year (1990, 1991, 2003, 2004).

The Basketball Bundesliga Coach of the Year (German: Trainer des Jahres) is an annual Basketball Bundesliga award that goes to the league's best coach. The award was handed out for the first time in 1989–90 season, to Dirk Bauermann. Bauermann holds the record for most awards won, with four.

== Winners ==
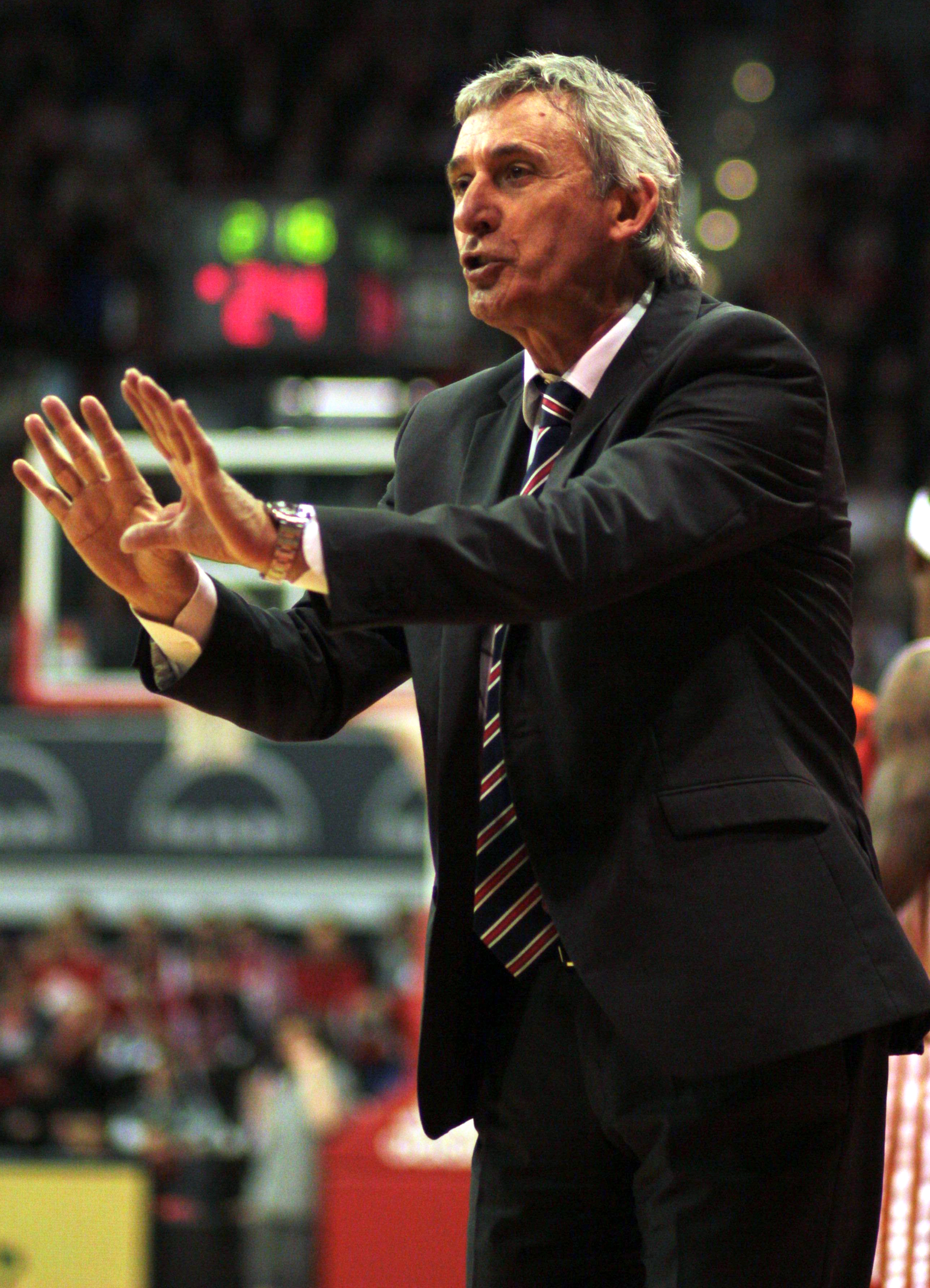
Svetislav Pešić was a 3 time Basketball Bundesliga Coach of the Year (1996, 1998, 1999).

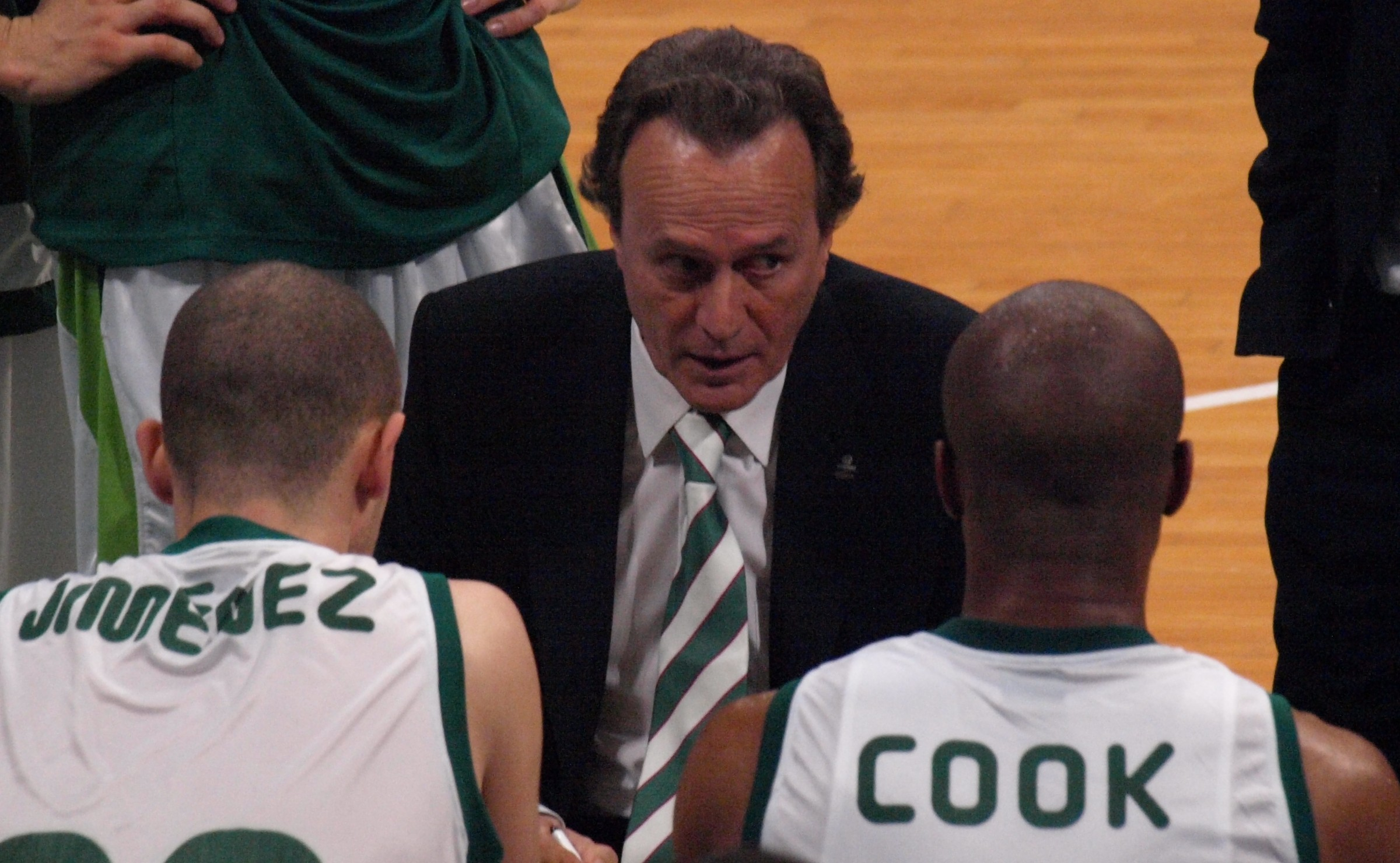
Aíto García Reneses was Basketball Bundesliga Coach of the Year in 2018.

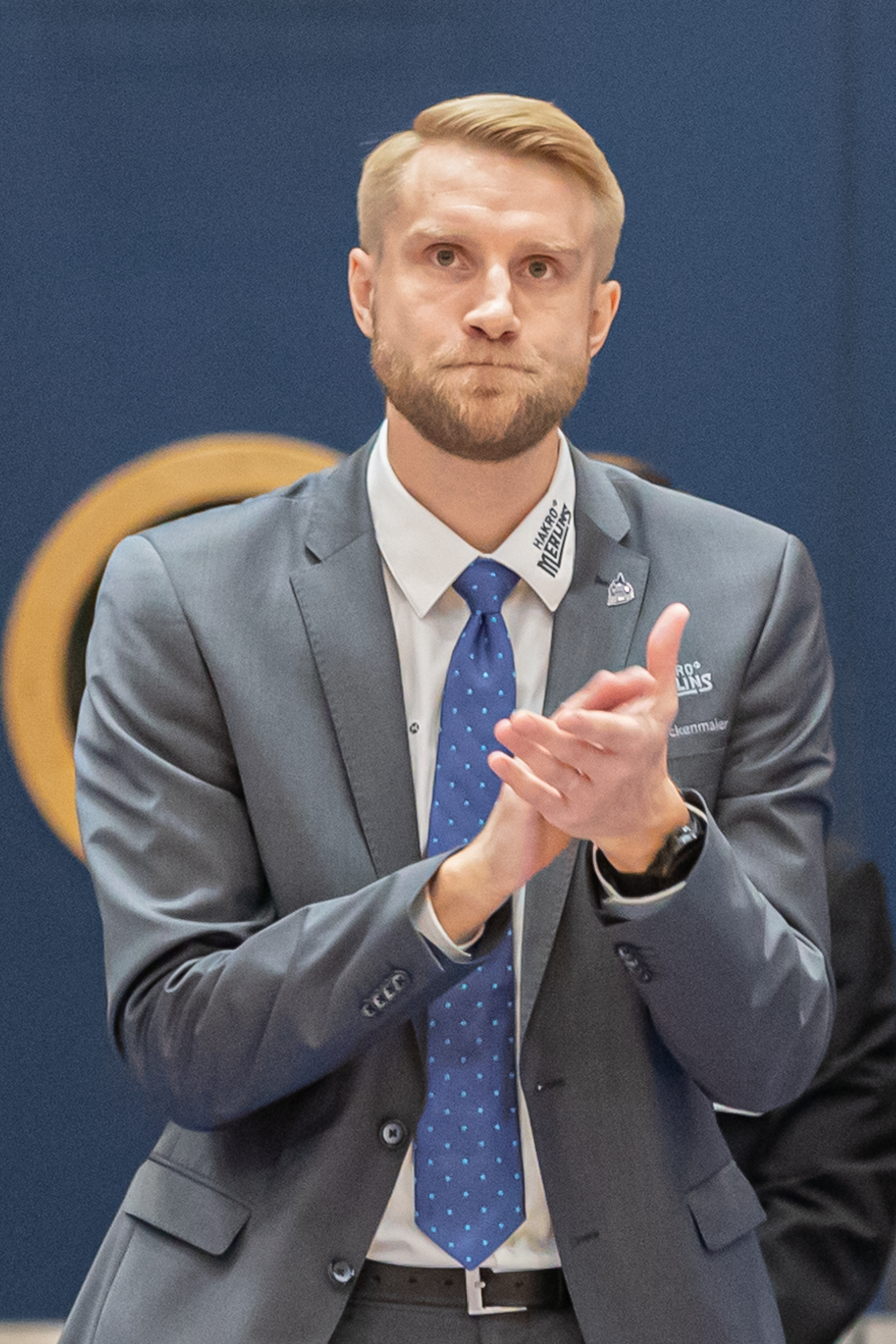
Tuomas Iisalo was named the Bundesliga Coach of the Year twice consecutively in 2022 and 2023.

Key
Coach (X)	Name of the coach and number of times they had won the award at that point (if more than one)
§	Denotes the club were Bundesliga champions in the same season

Season	Coach	Nationality	Team	Ref(s)
1989–90	Dirk Bauermann	West Germany	Bayer Giants Leverkusen	
1990–91	Dirk Bauermann (2×)	Germany	Bayer Giants Leverkusen	
1991–92				
1992–93				
1993–94				
1994–95				
1995–96	Svetislav Pešić	FR Yugoslavia	Alba Berlin	
1996–97				
1997–98	Svetislav Pešić (2×)	FR Yugoslavia	Alba Berlin	
1998–99	Svetislav Pešić (3×)	FR Yugoslavia	Alba Berlin	
1999–00	Stefan Koch	Germany	Skyliners Frankfurt	
2000–01				
2001–02	Emir Mutapčić	Bosnia	Alba Berlin	
2002–03	Dirk Bauermann (3×)	Germany	Brose Baskets	
2003–04	Dirk Bauermann (4×)	Germany	Brose Baskets	
2004–05	Stefan Koch (2×)	Germany	Gießen 46ers	
2005–06	Sarunas Sakalauskas	Lithuania	Eisbären Bremerhaven	
2006–07	Silvano Poropat	Croatia	EnBW Ludwigsburg	
2007–08	Achim Kuczmann	Germany	Bayer Giants Leverkusen	
2008–09	John Patrick	United States	MEG Göttingen	
2009–10	John Patrick (2×)	United States	BG Göttingen	
2010–11	Chris Fleming	United States	Brose Baskets §	
2011–12	Thorsten Leibenath	Germany	ratiopharm ulm	
2012–13	Sebastian Machowski	Germany	EWE Baskets Oldenburg	
2013–14	Silvano Poropat (2×)	Croatia	Mitteldeutscher	
2014–15	Saša Obradović	Serbia	Alba Berlin	
2015–16	Gordon Herbert	Canada	Skyliners Frankfurt	
2016–17	Thorsten Leibenath (2×)	Germany	ratiopharm Ulm	
2017–18	Aíto García Reneses	Spain	Alba Berlin	
2018–19	Pedro Calles	Spain	Rasta Vechta	
2019–20	No award was given, due to the shortened season because of the COVID-19 pandemic.			
2020–21	John Patrick (3×)	United States	Riesen Ludwigsburg	
2021–22	Tuomas Iisalo	Finland	Telekom Baskets Bonn	
2022–23	Tuomas Iisalo (2×)	Finland	Telekom Baskets Bonn	
2023–24	Rodrigo Pastore	Argentina	Niners Chemnitz	
2024–25	Jesús Ramírez	Spain	Basketball Löwen Braunschweig	
2025–26	Anton Gavel	Slovakia	Bamberg Baskets	
