= Basketball Bundesliga Best Offensive Player =

German basketball award

The Basketball Bundesliga Best Offensive Player (German: Bester Offensivspieler) is an annual Basketball Bundesliga (BBL) award that has been given since the 2003–04 season, to the league's best offensive player. The inaugural winner of the award was BJ McKie of TBB Trier. Julius Jenkins holds the record of most awards won, with three.

== Winners ==
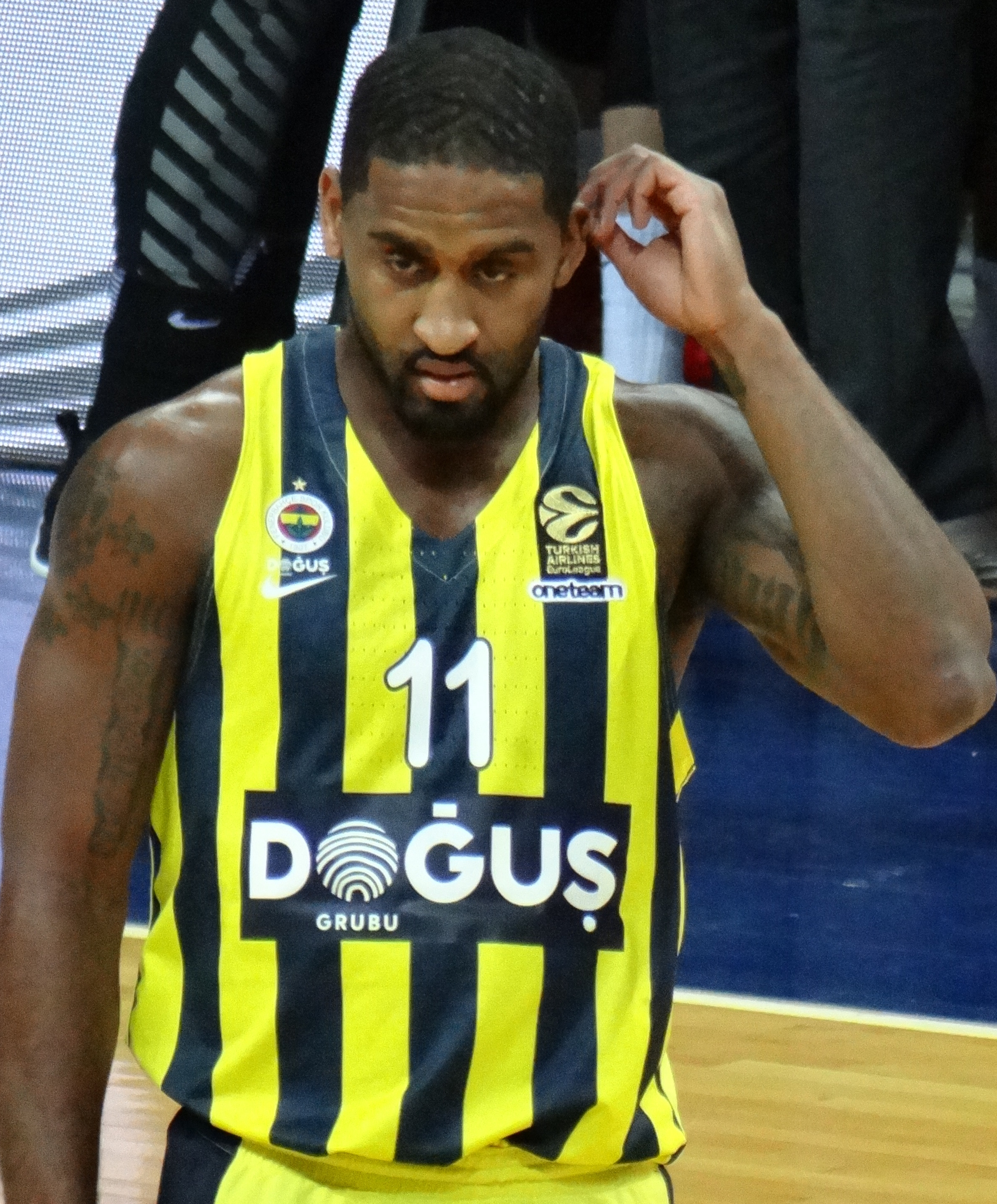
Brad Wanamaker won the award in 2016

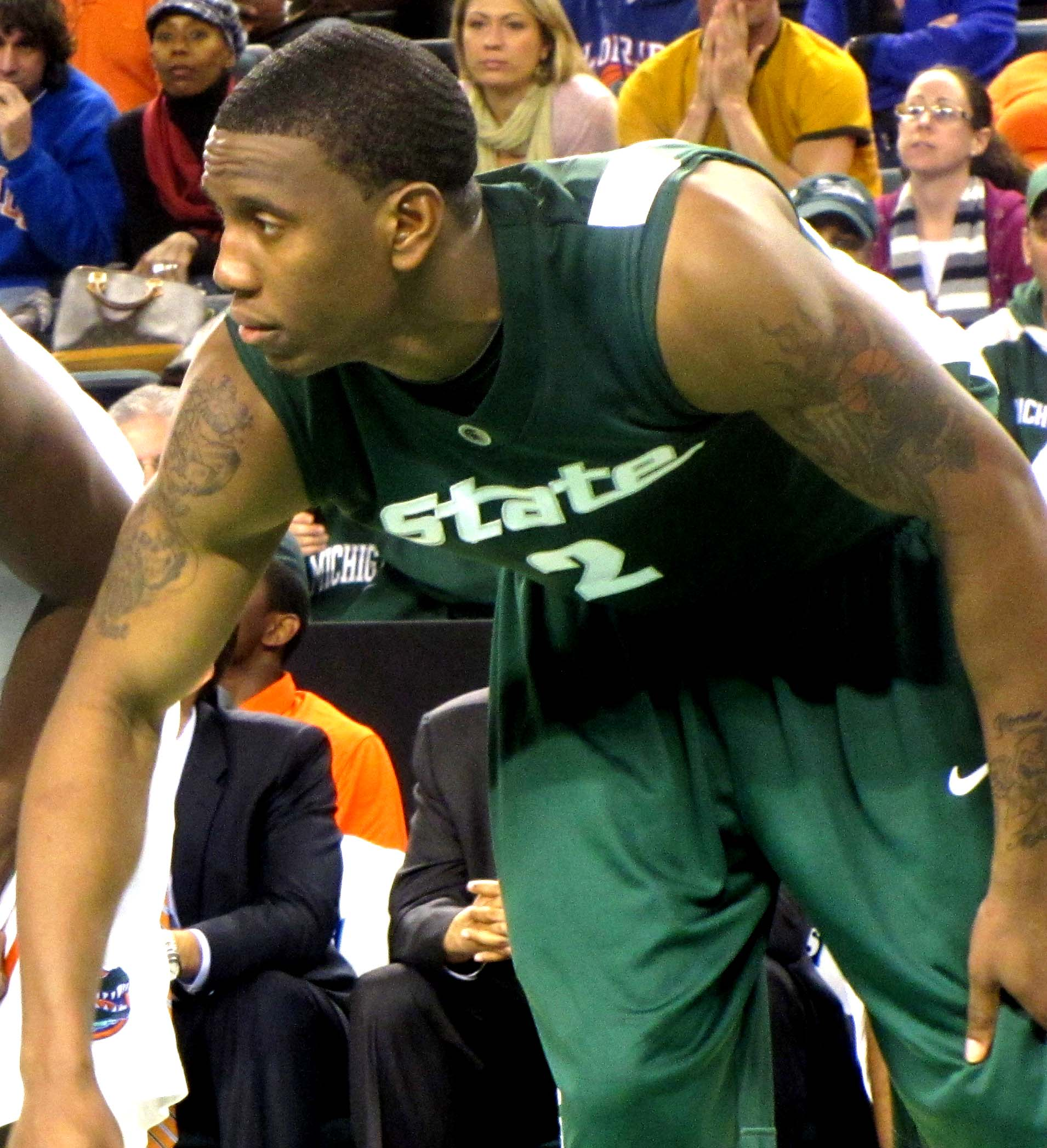
Raymar Morgan won the award in the 2016–17 season

Key
Player (X)	Denotes the number of times the player has won the award
Club (X)	Name of the club and the number of times a player of it has won the award (if more than one)
*	Inducted into the FIBA Hall of Fame
^	Denotes player who is still active in the Bundesliga

Season	Player	Position	Nationality	Team	Ref.
2003–04	BJ McKie	Guard	United States	TBB Trier	
2004–05	Chuck Eidson	Forward	United States	Gießen 46ers	
2005–06	Andrew Wisniewski	Guard	United States	Telekom Baskets Bonn	
2006–07	Casey Jacobsen	Guard	United States	Brose Baskets	
2007–08	Julius Jenkins^	Guard	United States	Alba Berlin	
2008–09	Julius Jenkins (2)^	Guard	United States	Alba Berlin	
2009–10	Julius Jenkins (3)^	Guard	United States	Alba Berlin	
2010–11	DaShaun Wood	Guard	United States	Skyliners Frankfurt	
2011–12	DaShaun Wood (2)	Guard	United States	Alba Berlin	
2012–13	John Bryant^	Center	United States	ratiopharm ulm	
2013–14	Darius Adams	Guard	Bulgaria (Note: Adams, born in Decatur, Illinois, is an American naturalized Bulgarian.)	Eisbären Bremerhaven	
2014–15	D. J. Kennedy	Guard/forward	United States	MHP Riesen Ludwigsburg	
2015–16	Brad Wanamaker	Guard	United States	Brose Baskets	
2016–17	Raymar Morgan	Forward/center	United States	ratiopharm Ulm	
2017–18	Philip Scrubb	Guard	Canada (Note: Philip Scrubb also owns the British nationality.)	Fraport Skyliners	
2018–19	John Bryant (2)^	Center	United States	Gießen 46ers	
2019–20	No award was given, due to the shortened season because of the COVID-19 pandemic.				
2020–21	Trae Bell-Haynes^	Point guard	Canada	Crailsheim Merlins	
2021–22	T. J. Shorts^	Point guard	United States	Crailsheim Merlins	
2022–23	DeWayne Russell^	Point guard	United States	Baskets Oldenburg	
2023–24	Otis Livingston II^	Point guard	United States	Würzburg Baskets	
2024–25	Jhivvan Jackson^	Guard	United States	Würzburg Baskets	
2025–26	Jordan Roland^	Guard	United States	Vet-Concept Gladiators Trier	
