= Silvano Poropat =

Croatian professional basketball coach (born 1971)

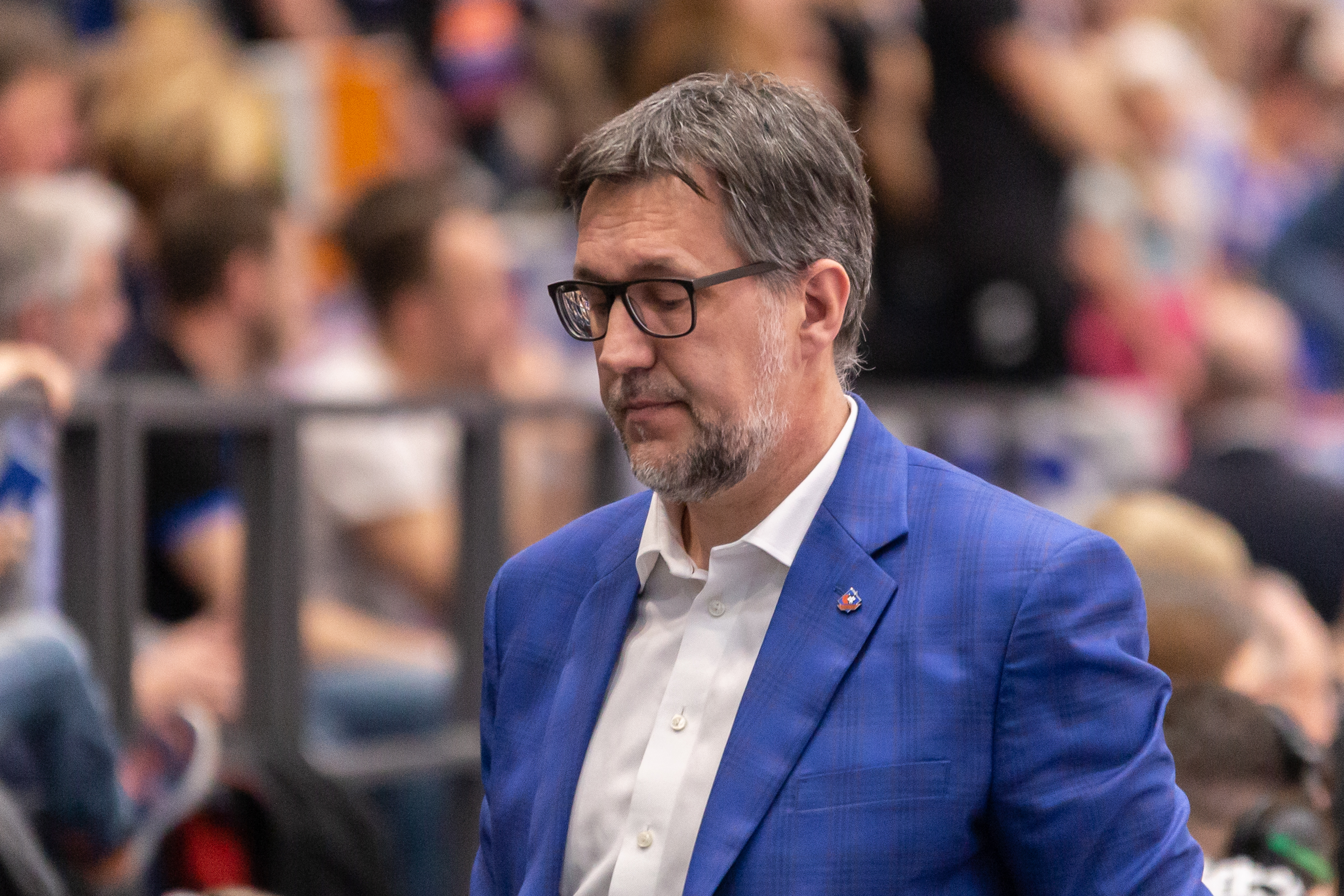
- Poropat coaching Mitteldeutscher BC in 2019

Personal information
- Born: April 16, 1971 (age 55) Pula, SFR Yugoslavia (now Croatia)
- Position: Head coach
- Coaching career: 2000–present

Career history

Coaching
- 2000–2004: Ludwigsburg (assistant)
- 2004–2008: Ludwigsburg
- 2010: Ventspils
- 2010: Karlsruhe
- 2011–2015: Mitteldeutscher BC
- 2016: Telekom Baskets Bonn
- 2017–2018: New Heroes Den Bosch
- 2019: Mitteldeutscher BC
- 2020–2021: Mitteldeutscher BC

Career highlights
- ProA champion (2012); 2× German Bundesliga Coach of the Year (2007, 2014)

Silvano Poropat (born April 19, 1971) is a Croatian professional basketball coach. Poropat started his coaching career in 2000, and since then he has coached in Germany, Latvia and the Netherlands.

== Coaching career ==
On January 1, 2010, Poropat was signed by Latvian side BK Ventspils as their new head coach. On May 5, 2011, Poropat was fired after failing to reach the LKL finals.

From 2011 until 2015, Poropat was the head coach of German side Mitteldeutscher BC. In the 2011–12 season, Poropat won the second division ProA with Mitteldeutscher and promoted to the Basketball Bundesliga. He was named the BBL Coach of the Year of the 2013–14 season.

On March 3, 2016, Telekom Baskets Bonn signed Poropat as their new head coach.

On May 31, 2017, Poropat signed a two-year contract with New Heroes Den Bosch of the Dutch Basketball League. On March 12, 2018, Poropat was suspended for four games in the DBL, after insulting referees during a game. Den Bosch finished fourth in the standings and was eliminated in the quarter-finals by fifth seed Rotterdam. On the first day of the start of his second season with Den Bosch, Poropat and New Heroes parted ways.

In January 2019, Poropat returned to Mitteldeutscher BC.
