= Basketball Bundesliga Best Defender =

German basketball award

The Basketball Bundesliga Best Defender (German: Basketball Bundesliga Bester Verteidiger) is an annual Basketball Bundesliga (BBL) award given since the 2002–03 season to the league's best defensive player. American player Immanuel McElroy is the all-time record holder for most awards, with five.

== Winners ==
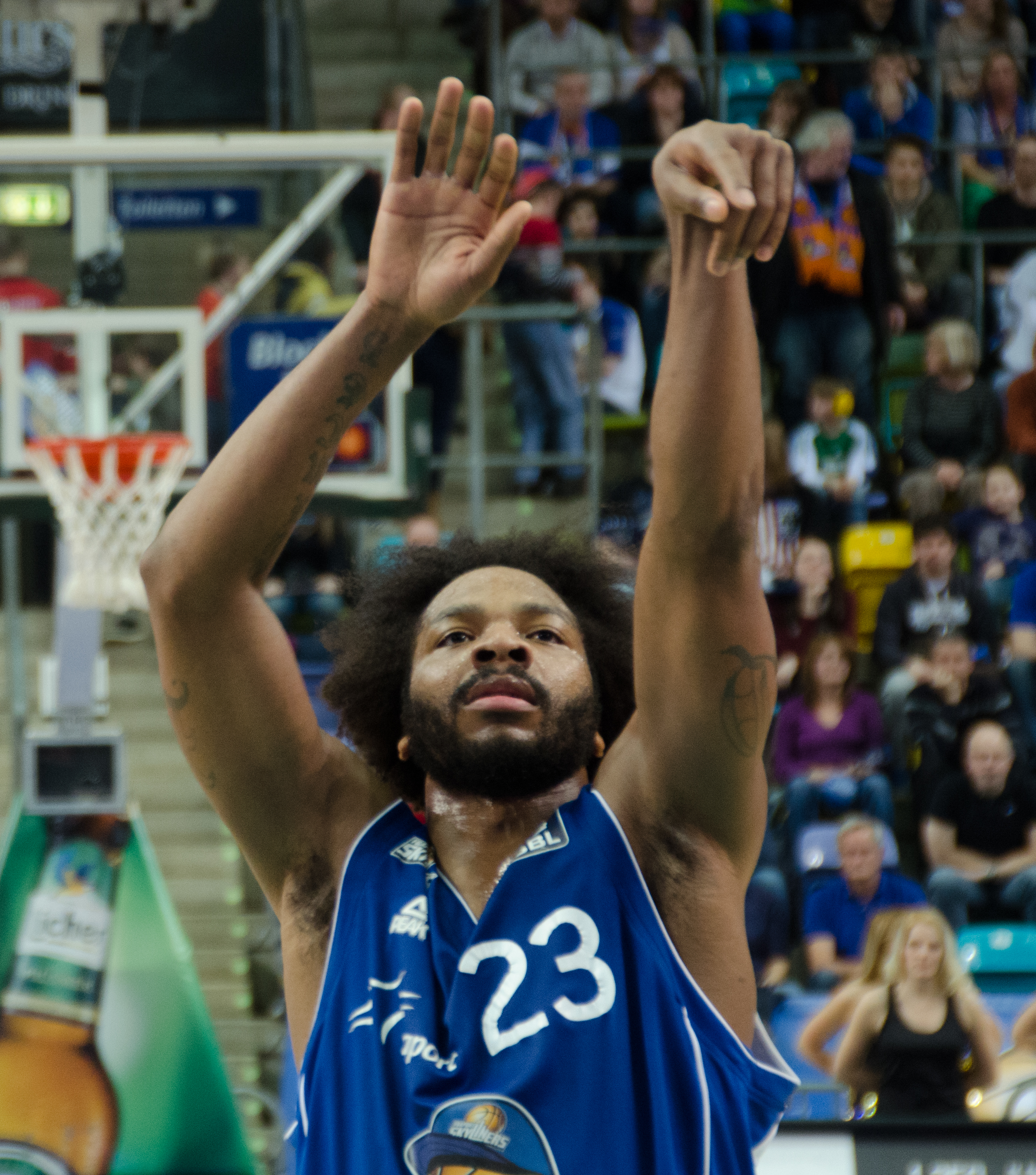
Quantez Robertson won the award in 2016

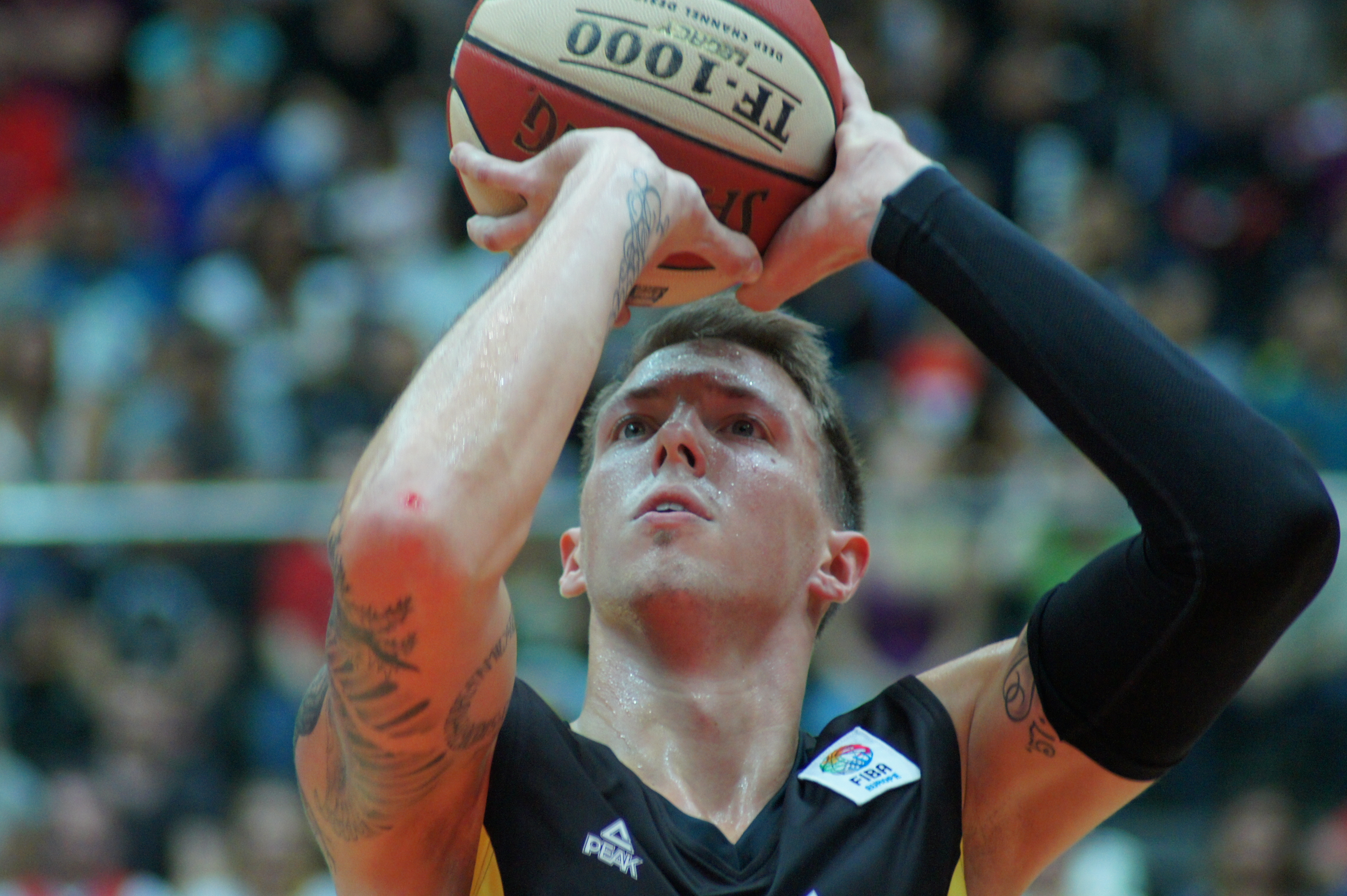
Daniel Theis won the award in 2017

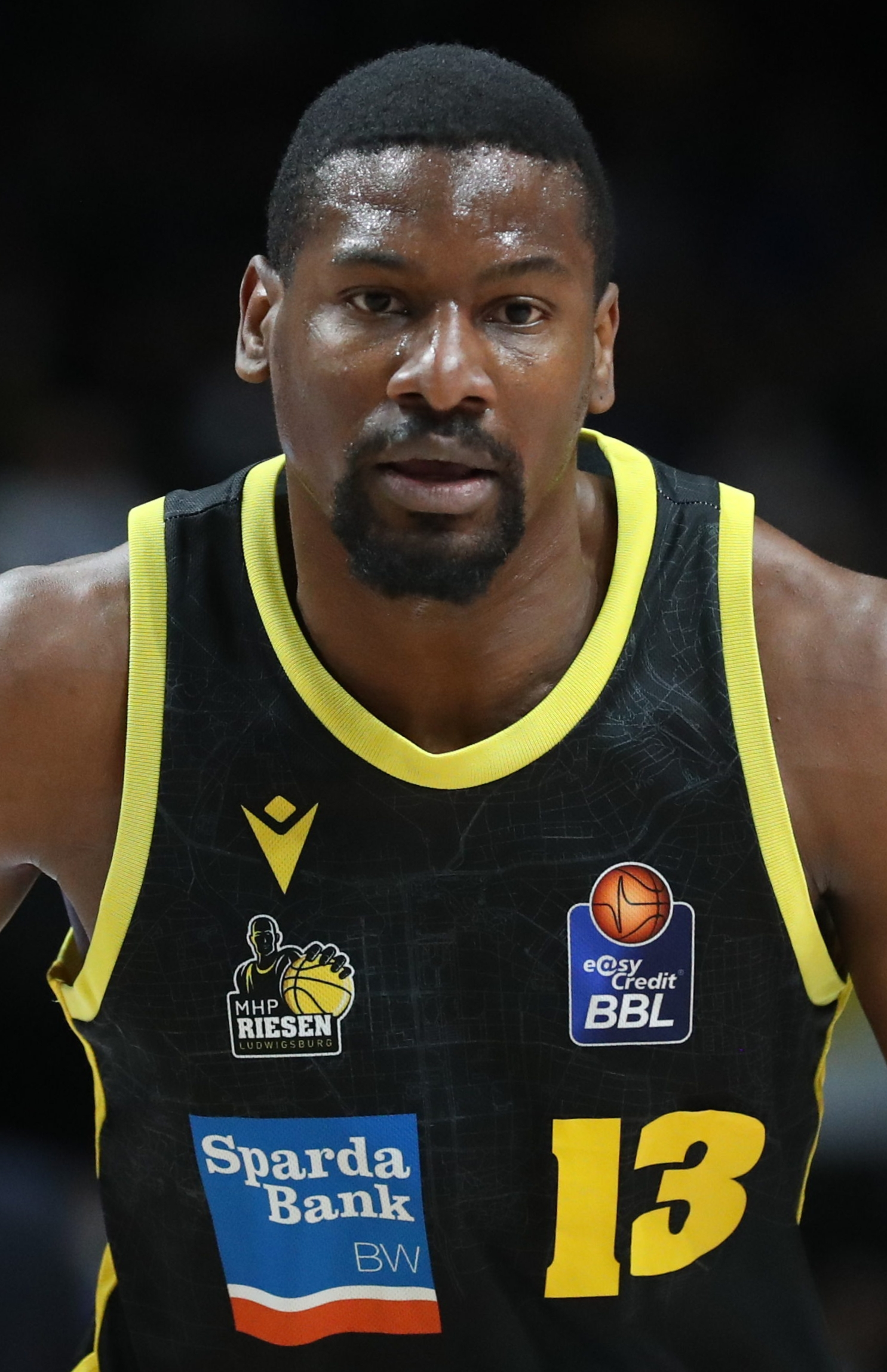
Yorman Polas Bartolo won the award two consecutive times in 2019 and 2021

Key
Player (X)	Denotes the number of times the player has won the award
Club (X)	Name of the club and the number of times a player of it has won the award (if more than one)
*	Inducted into the FIBA Hall of Fame
^	Denotes player who is still active in the Bundesliga

Season	Player	Position (Note: The player's primary position is listed.)	Nat.	Team	Ref(s)
2002–03	Quadre Lollis	Forward	United States	Alba Berlin	
2003–04	Oluoma Nnamaka	Forward	Sweden	Telekom Baskets Bonn	
2004–05	Koko Archibong	Forward	Nigeria (Note: Koko Archibong also owns American nationality.)	GHP Bamberg	
2004–05	Matej Mamić	Forward	Croatia	Alba Berlin	
2005–06	Koko Archibong (2)	Forward	Nigeria	GHP Bamberg	
2006–07	Immanuel McElroy	Guard	United States	Alba Berlin	
2007–08	Immanuel McElroy (2)	Guard	United States	Alba Berlin	
2008–09	Immanuel McElroy (3)	Guard	United States	Alba Berlin	
2009–10	Immanuel McElroy (4)	Guard	United States	Alba Berlin	
2010–11	Immanuel McElroy (5)	Guard	United States	Alba Berlin	
2011–12	Anton Gavel	Guard	Germany (Note: Anton Gavel also owns Slovak nationality.)	Brose Baskets	
2012–13	Anton Gavel (2)	Guard	Germany	Brose Baskets	
2013–14	Cliff Hammonds	Guard	United States	Alba Berlin	
2014–15	Cliff Hammonds (2)	Guard	United States	Alba Berlin	
2015–16	Quantez Robertson^	Guard	United States	Fraport Skyliners	
2016–17	Daniel Theis	Center	Germany	Brose Bamberg	
2017–18	Thomas Walkup^	Guard	USA	Riesen Ludwigsburg	
2018–19	Yorman Polas Bartolo	Forward	Cuba (Note: Polas Bartolo, born in Cuba, gained the German nationality in 2015. He represents Cuba internationally.)	Telekom Baskets Bonn	
2019–20	No award was given, due to the shortened season because of the COVID-19 pandemic.				
2020–21	Yorman Polas Bartolo (2)^	Forward	Cuba	Riesen Ludwigsburg	
2021–22	Justin Simon^	Shooting guard	United States	Riesen Ludwigsburg	
2022–23	Selom Mawugbe^	Center	United States	Rostock Seawolves	
2023–24	Javon Bess^	Swingman	United States	BG Göttingen	
2024–25	Nick Weiler-Babb^	Swingman	Germany	Bayern Munich	
2025–26	EJ Onu^	Center	United States	Bamberg Baskets	

== Awards won by player ==
Player	Total
Immanuel McElroy	4
Yorman Polas Bartolo	2
Anton Gavel	2
Koko Archibong	2
Cliff Hammonds	2
