= Thorsten Leibenath =

German basketball player and coach

FC Bayern Munich
- Position: Sporting director
- League: Basketball Bundesliga; EuroLeague

Personal information
- Born: 7 April 1975 (age 51) Leverkusen, Germany
- Coaching career: 1999–present

Career history

Coaching
- 1999–2000: TV 1860 Lich (assistant)
- 2000–2006: Gießen 46ers (assistant)
- 2006–2007: Scottish Rocks
- 2007–2008: Gießen 46ers
- 2008–2010: Artland Dragons
- 2011: Giro-Live Ballers Osnabrück
- 2011–2019: ratiopharm Ulm

Career highlights
- 2× German Bundesliga Coach of the Year (2012, 2017)

Thorsten Leibenath (born 7 April 1975) is a German professional basketball executive, coach and former player. He is the sporting director of Bayern Munich of the Basketball Bundesliga and the EuroLeague. Leibenath coached the Ulm basketball team for eight years, spanning from 2011 until 2019.

== Coaching career ==
Leibenath began his coaching career at TV Lich, a second-division team in Germany. With TV Lich, Leibenath won the championship, promoting the club to the first division. After his stint with TV Lich, Leibenath moved to Gießen 46ers where he worked as an assistant coach for six seasons.

During the 2006-07 season the German was head coach of the Scottish Rocks in the British Basketball League. At the end of his first season in British basketball, Leibenath reached the BBL Cup final, eventually losing to Guildford Heat 82–79, while also finishing 4th in the League Championship, and lead the Rocks to the BBL Playoff final, losing eventually to Newcastle Eagles. He also picked up the BBL Coach of the Month award for March 2007.

In 2008, Leibenath returned to Germany, taking over as head coach of Artland Dragons basketball team. While playing in the EuroCup and the EuroChallenge in the 2008/2009 and 2009/2010 season, the club only ranked 9th in the regular season in both years, missing the Basketball Bundesliga play-offs. In May 2010, team management decided to release Leibenath who moved to GiroLive-Ballers Osnabrück in the German Pro-A league (lower division).

In May 2011, Leibenath signed as head coach with ratiopharm Ulm in the German Basketball Bundesliga. In the 2016–17 season, he led Ulm to a Bundesliga all-time best winning streak of 27 games and was honored as Bundesliga Coach of the Year.

In March 2019, it was announced that Leibenath would step down after the end of the season and would assume the function of Sports Director at ratiopharm Ulm. With Leibenath as sporting director, the club secured its first German championship in 2023. During his tenure, several young players from Ulm made the transition to the National Basketball Association (NBA), including Pacôme Dadiet, Noa Essengue and Killian Hayes.

On 1 July 2026, he became the sports director of Bayern Munich.
