= Koko Archibong =

Nigerian-American basketball player (born 1981)

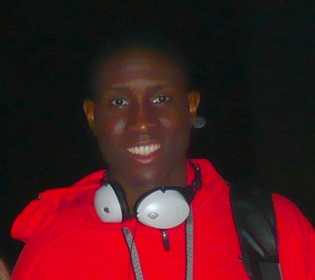

Personal information
- Born: May 10, 1981 (age 45) New York City, New York
- Listed height: 6 ft 9 in (2.06 m)
- Listed weight: 220 lb (100 kg)

Career information
- High school: Polytechnic School (Pasadena, California)
- College: University of Pennsylvania (1999–2003)
- NBA draft: 2003: undrafted
- Playing career: 2003–2012
- Position: Small Forward

Career history
- 2003–2004: Pau-Orthez
- 2004–2006: Baskets
- 2006–2007: Alba Berlin
- 2007–2008: Skyliners Frankfurt
- 2008–2009: Prokom Sopot
- 2009–2010: Giants Düsseldorf
- 2010–2011: Bayreuth
- 2011–2012: Gießen 46ers

Career highlights
- 2× All-BBL Team (2005, 2006); 2× BBL Best Defender (2005, 2006); BBL Rookie of the Year (2005)

Aniekan Okon “Koko” Archibong (born May 10, 1981) is a former Nigerian-American professional basketball player. At a height of 2.06 m (6 ft 9 in) tall, he played at the small forward position.

== Early life and education ==
Koko Archibong was born as Aniekan Okon Archibong in New York City, the first-born son in his family. His parents were academic scholars who emigrated to the United States for their studies. He is called Koko because it means "junior" in Nigeria.

He attended the Polytechnic School in Pasadena, California, and then the University of Pennsylvania where he earned a Pre-Med bachelor's degree (BSc Pre-Med) in 2003. He subsequently earned a Master of Public Health (MPH) degree from the University of Liverpool in 2013.

He is the older brother of artist and designer Ini Archibong.

== Work and career ==
In 2013, Archibong founded a basketball skills training business and also became assistant athletic director of the Polytechnic School, his alma mater. He became a client relationship associate with the Capital Group in 2015, and now serves as a vice president and Private Wealth Advisor.

== College basketball career ==
Archibong played college basketball at the University of Pennsylvania, with the Penn Quakers from 2000 to 2003. In his junior season, he averaged 14.2 points and 5.7 rebounds, while shooting .510 shooting from the field. In the same season, he set a school record (along with teammates Tim Begley, Ugonna Onyekwe and Jeff Schiffner) by starting all 32 games the Quakers played that season.

Archibong captained the 2002–03 team with Andy Toole, leading Penn to a 22–6 record (including a 14–0 Ivy League mark) and advancing to the NCAA Tournament for the second year in a row. He ended his Penn career with 1,131 points, 504 rebounds, 110 assists, 76 steals and 59 blocked shots while making 99 starts. He was a two-time All-Ivy and Academic All-Ivy League selection.

== Professional basketball career ==
After a few pre-draft workouts with the Phoenix Suns, he went undrafted in the 2003 NBA draft. He went on to become part of the Suns' Summer League team in the 2003 Reebok Rocky Mountain Revue in Salt Lake City. He later made to the training camp of the Los Angeles Lakers in 2003.

Archibong played professional basketball in France, Germany, and Poland. In 2005, he won the German League championship with GHP Bamberg. He played in the EuroLeague with the clubs Pau-Orthez, Brose Baskets, and Prokom Sopot.

== Nigerian national team ==
Archibong played with the senior men's Nigerian national basketball team. He competed at the 2012 Summer Olympics.
