= Julius Jenkins =

American basketball player

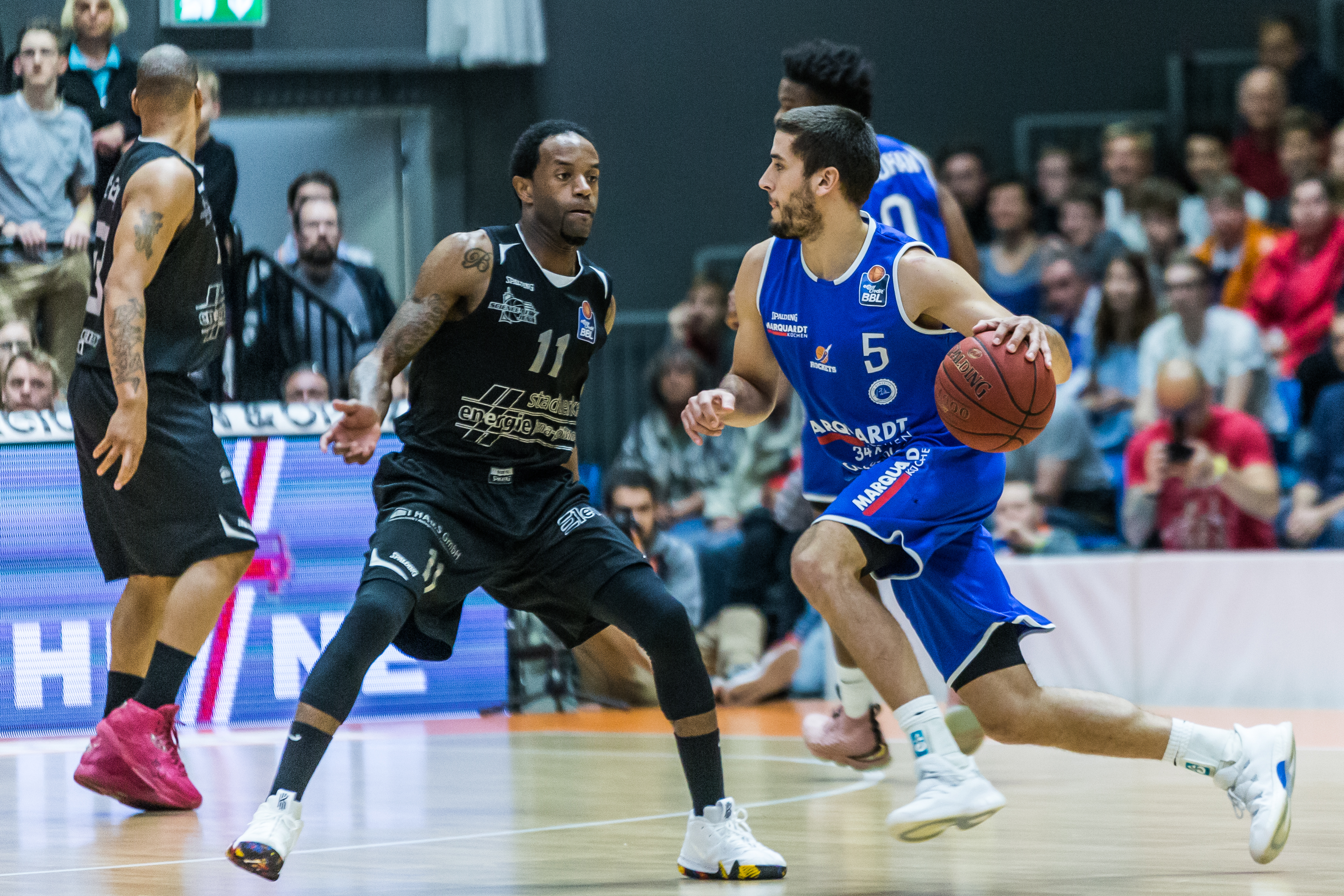
- Jenkins in 2018 (#11)

Personal information
- Born: February 10, 1981 (age 45) Fort Lauderdale, Florida, U.S.
- Listed height: 1.87 m (6 ft 2 in)
- Listed weight: 81 kg (179 lb)

Career information
- High school: Deerfield Beach (Deerfield Beach, Florida)
- College: Georgia Southern (1999–2003)
- NBA draft: 2003: undrafted
- Playing career: 2003–2020
- Position: Point guard / shooting guard

Career history
- 2003–2005: Nürnberg
- 2005–2006: Bree BBC
- 2006–2011: ALBA Berlin
- 2011–2012: Brose Baskets
- 2012–2015: EWE Baskets Oldenburg
- 2015–2016: Budućnost Podgorica
- 2016–2020: Science City Jena

Career highlights
- 6× All-Bundesliga Team (2007–2011, 2014); 2× German League champion (2008, 2012); 3× German Cup winner (2009, 2012, 2015); Montenegrin League champion (2016); Montenegrin Cup winner (2016); 2× Bundesliga MVP (2008, 2010); Bundesliga Finals MVP (2008); 3× Bundesliga Best Offensive Player (2007–2010)

Julius Jenkins (born February 10, 1981) is an American former professional basketball player. He played college basketball at Georgia Southern University before playing professionally in Germany, Belgium and Montenegro.

== College career ==
Jenkins played at Georgia Southern University for four seasons from 1999 to 2003. As a senior, he averaged 21.7 points, 4.9 rebounds, 3.4 assists, and 1.1 steals per game in 27 games while shooting .455 from the field, .418 from three-point range, and .718 from the free-throw line. He finished his collegiate career as Georgia Southern's all-time leading scorer, with 1,870 points. For his senior year performance, Jenkins earned All-Southern Conference honors from both the coaches and media, and was named to the SoCon All-Tournament Second Team. He later went undrafted in the 2003 NBA draft.

== Professional career ==
He signed a contract extension with ALBA through the 2010–2011 season after being named the German League's MVP in 2008.

Before joining ALBA Berlin, Jenkins played professionally for RCE Nürnberg, also in Germany, and Euphony Bree in Belgium.

In July 2011 he signed a two-year deal with Brose Baskets in Germany. After only one year in Bamberg the club decided to cut him.

In July 2012, he sign a two-year deal with the EWE Baskets Oldenburg in Germany. In July 2014, he re–signed with Oldenburg.

On December 19, 2015, he signed with the Montenegrin club Budućnost Podgorica for the rest of the season.

On August 23, 2016, he signed with German club Science City Jena. On March 6, 2017, he re-signed with Jena for one more season.
