= Antonio Graves =

American basketball player (born 1985)

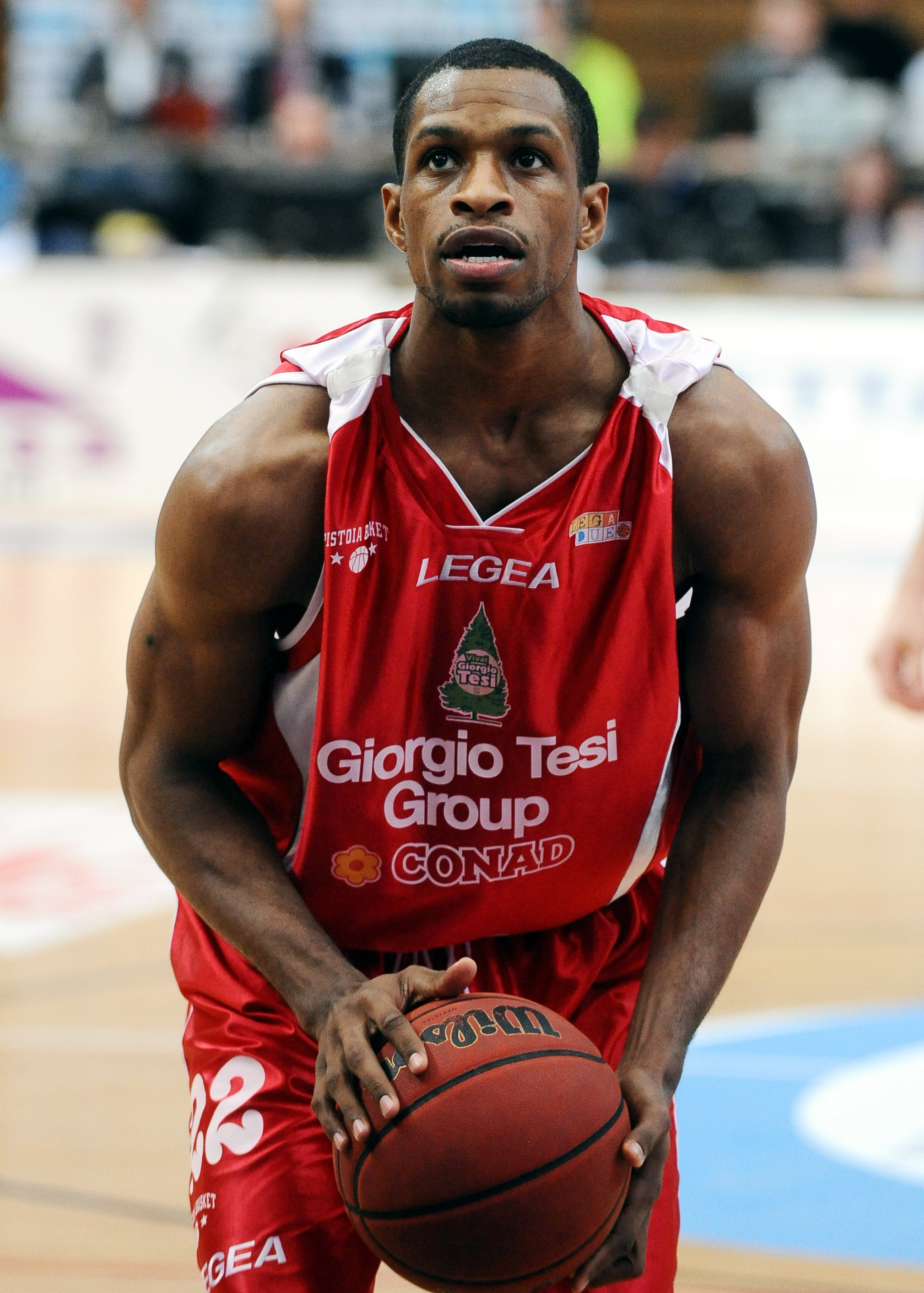

Personal information
- Born: April 17, 1985 (age 41) Mansfield, Ohio, U.S.
- Listed height: 6 ft 3 in (1.91 m)
- Listed weight: 190 lb (86 kg)

Career information
- High school: Mansfield (Mansfield, Ohio)
- College: Pittsburgh (2003–2007)
- NBA draft: 2007: undrafted
- Playing career: 2007–2019
- Position: Shooting guard

Career history
- 2007: Pittsburgh Xplosion
- 2007–2008: Pau Orthez
- 2008–2009: Galatasaray Café Crown
- 2009: Cibona
- 2010: Hapoel Holon
- 2010–2011: Banvit
- 2011–2012: Canton Charge
- 2012–2013: Giorgio Tesi Group Pistoia
- 2013–2015: Artland Dragons
- 2016: Crailsheim Merlins
- 2016–2017: Skyliners Frankfurt
- 2017: Tsmoki-Minsk
- 2017–2019: Ormanspor Genclik Ankara

Antonio Graves Davis (born April 17, 1985) is an American professional basketball player for Ormanspor Genclik Ankara of the Turkish Basketball First League. He played college basketball for the Pittsburgh Panthers.

== Career ==
After completing college with the University of Pittsburgh, he played for Pittsburgh Xplosion of the (Continental Basketball Association) during 2007–08 season.

He signed for Élan Béarnais Pau-Orthez (Pro A) in December 2007.

After participating in the U.S. summer league during summer 2008, he signed with Galatasaray Café Crown (Turkish Basketball League).

In August 2013, he signed with Artland Dragons of the German Basketball League. In August 2014, he re-signed with Dragons for one more season.

On February 26, 2016, Graves signed with Crailsheim Merlins for the rest of the 2015–16 season.

On September 6, 2016, Graves signed a deal until mid-January 2017, with Skyliners Frankfurt. Following the expiration of his contract, on January 13, 2017, he parted ways with Skyliners after averaging 7.7 points per game.

== The Basketball Tournament (TBT) ==
In the summer of 2017, Graves competed in The Basketball Tournament on ESPN for the number one-seeded FCM Untouchables. Competing for the $2 million grand prize, Graves averaged 4.3 points, 1.3 rebounds, 1.3 assists and 1.0 steals per game. The Untouchables advanced to the Super 16 Round where they were defeated 85–71 by Team FOE, a Philadelphia-based team coached by NBA forwards Markieff and Marcus Morris. Graves also played for the Untouchables during the summer of 2016. Over the span of four games, he averaged 6.5 points, 1.8 rebounds and 1.3 assists while shooting 43% from the three-point line.
