= Stefan Koch =

German basketball coach

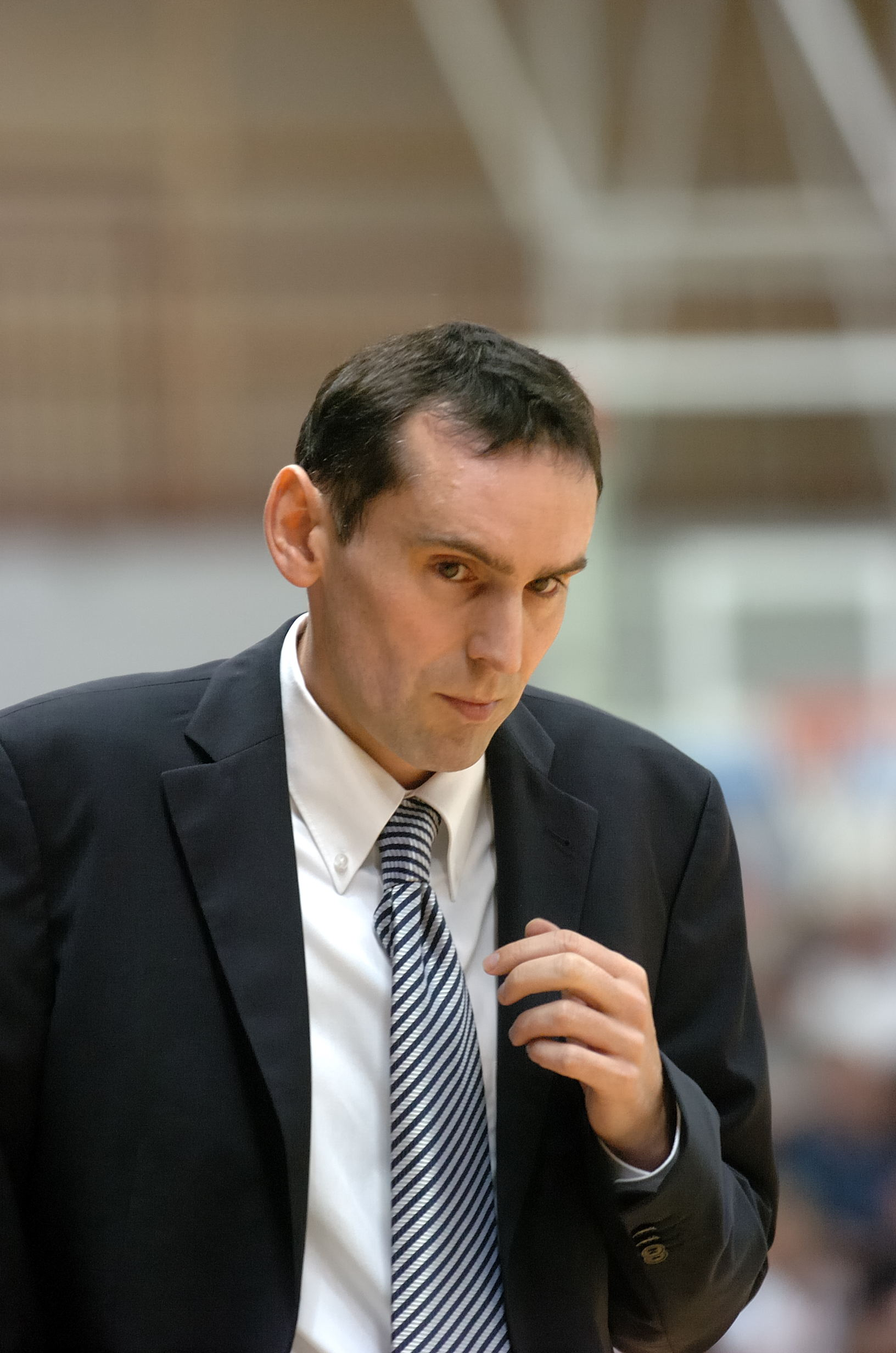
- Koch in 2006

Personal information
- Born: 24 April 1964 (age 62) Lich, Hesse, Germany
- Position: Head coach
- Coaching career: 1988–2014

Career history

Coaching
- 1999 - 2001: Skyliners Frankfurt
- 2013 - 2014: Baskets Würzburg

Stefan Koch (born 24 April 1964) is a former German professional basketball coach.

As head coach of the Skyliners Frankfurt, he won the 2000 German Basketball Cup and, at the end of the season, was elected as Germany’s coach of the year.

In later stages of his career, he was head coach of the Baskets Würzburg.

Since autumn 2014 he has been commentator, expert and columnist for Telekom basketball.
