= Cliff Hammonds =

American basketball player (born 1985)

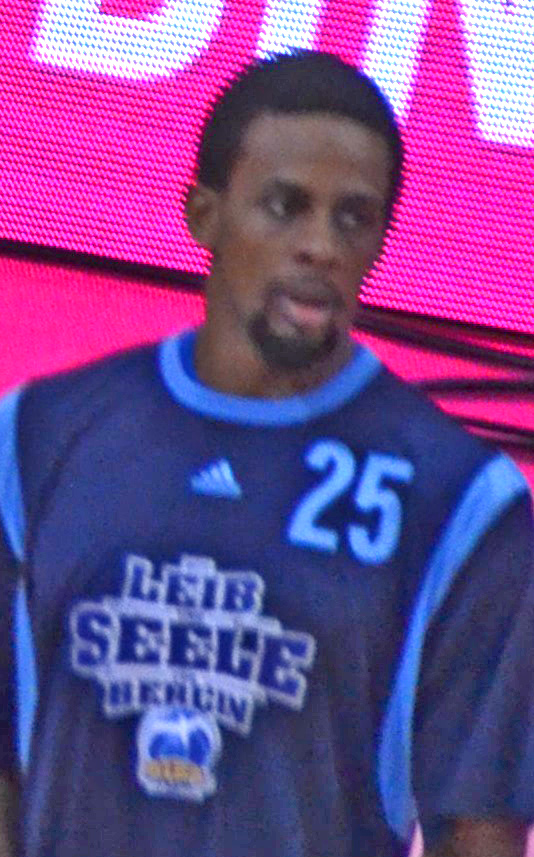
- Hammonds in action with Alba Berlin

Free Agent
- Position: Point guard

Personal information
- Born: December 18, 1985 (age 40) Fort Bragg, North Carolina, U.S.
- Listed height: 6 ft 3 in (1.91 m)
- Listed weight: 200 lb (91 kg)

Career information
- High school: Cairo (Cairo, Georgia)
- College: Clemson (2004–2008)
- NBA draft: 2008: undrafted
- Playing career: 2008–present

Career history
- 2008: Darüşşafaka
- 2009: Efes Pilsen
- 2009: Piratas de Quebradillas
- 2009–2010: Peristeri
- 2010–2011: ASVEL Basket
- 2011–2012: Banvit
- 2012–2013: Igokea
- 2013–2015: Alba Berlin
- 2015–2016: Reno Bighorns
- 2016: Limoges CSP
- 2016–2017: MHP Riesen Ludwigsburg
- 2017: Piratas de Quebradillas
- 2017–2018: s.Oliver Würzburg
- 2018–2019: Spirou
- 2019–2020: Ifaistos Limnou
- 2020: Ionikos Nikaias
- 2021–2025: Limburg United

Career highlights
- Belgian Cup winner (2022); All-PBL Defensive Team (2019); German Cup winner (2014); 2× German Bundesliga Best Defender (2014, 2015); Bosnian League champion (2013); Bosnian Cup winner (2013); Third-team All-ACC (2008)

Clifford Daniel Hammonds IV (born December 18, 1985) is an American professional basketball player who last played for Limburg United of the BNXT League. The 6 ft 3 in (1.91 m) point guard played college basketball for the Clemson Tigers.

== High school and college basketball ==
Hammonds attended Cairo High School in his hometown Cairo, Georgia. He played college basketball at the Clemson University. In his four-year career with the Clemson Tigers, he played 134 games, averaging 10.9 points, 3.6 rebounds, 3.5 assists and 1.7 steals per game. Hammonds graduated from Clemson with a double major in architecture and psychology in 2008. He received the inaugural Skip Prosser Award, recognizing the top scholar-athlete in ACC men's basketball.

== Professional career ==
His first team in Europe was Darüşşafaka of the Turkish Basketball League. He played there till the December 2008 when he moved to Efes Pilsen. With Efes he stayed only couple weeks and played five EuroLeague games, and then returned to Darüşşafaka where he finished the season.

During the summer of 2009 Hammonds played with Piratas de Quebradillas. The following season, he played with Peristeri, where he averaged 12.9 points, 3.1 rebounds, 3.7 assists and 1.5 steals per game in the Greek Basket League.

In June 2010, Hammonds signed a one–year deal with ASVEL Basket. In August 2011, he signed a one–year deal with Banvit. In August 2012, he signed a one–year deal with KK Igokea. In July 2013, Hammonds signed a two–year deal with Alba Berlin.

On October 31, 2015, Hammonds was selected by the Rio Grande Valley Vipers with the 12th overall pick in the 2015 NBA Development League Draft, only to be traded to the Reno Bighorns on draft night.

On September 24, 2016, Hammonds signed with Limoges CSP of the French LNB Pro A. On November 8, 2016, he left Limoges and signed with German club MHP Riesen Ludwigsburg for the rest of the season.

On July 21, 2017, Hammonds signed with s.Oliver Würzburg of the German Basketball Bundesliga for the 2017–18 season.

On July 31, 2018, Hammonds was announced by Belgian club Proximus Spirou.

On August 6, 2019, Hammonds returned to Greece after ten years and signed with Ifaistos Limnou.

On November 3, 2020, Hammonds has signed with Ionikos Nikaias of the Greek Basket League.

On January 7, 2021, Hammonds signed with Limburg United in Belgium.

== Career statistics ==
Legend
GP	Games played	GS	Games started	MPG	Minutes per game
FG%	Field-goal percentage	3P%	3-point field-goal percentage	FT%	Free-throw percentage
RPG	Rebounds per game	APG	Assists per game	SPG	Steals per game
BPG	Blocks per game	PPG	Points per game	PIR	Performance index rating
**Bold**	Career high

=== EuroLeague ===
Year	Team	GP	GS	MPG	FG%	3P%	FT%	RPG	APG	SPG	BPG	PPG	PIR
2008–09	Efes Pilsen	5	0	11.2	**.462**	.333	**.833**	.0	.8	**.8**	.2	3.8	3.0
2014–15	Alba Berlin	**20**	**20**	**25.8**	.457	**.353**	.750	**2.1**	**2.9**	.6	**.4**	**8.1**	**7.2**
Career		25	20	22.9	.457	.351	.773	1.7	2.5	.6	.3	7.2	6.4
