= Larry Gordon (basketball) =

American basketball player (born 1987)

Personal information
- Born: April 18, 1987 (age 39) Pomona, California, U.S.
- Listed height: 6 ft 5 in (1.96 m)
- Listed weight: 217 lb (98 kg)

Career information
- High school: Montclair (Montclair, California)
- College: Cal Poly Pomona (2005–2009)
- NBA draft: 2009: undrafted
- Playing career: 2009–present
- Position: Shooting guard / small forward

Career history
- 2009–2010: Landstede Basketbal
- 2010–2012: Kapfenberg Bulls
- 2012–2015: Phoenix Hagen
- 2015–2016: Eisbären Bremerhaven
- 2016: Busan KT Sonicboom
- 2016–2017: SC Rasta Vechta
- 2017–2018: BC Astana
- 2018–2019: Gießen 46ers
- 2019–2020: Hapoel Eilat
- 2020–2021: FC Porto

Career highlights
- Kazakhstan League champion (2018); Kazakhstan Cup winner (2018); Portugal Cup winner (2020)

Larry Rayshawn Gordon (born April 18, 1987) is a retired American professional basketball player. He played college basketball for Cal Poly Pomona before playing professionally in the Netherlands, Austria, Germany, South Korea, Kazakhstan, Israel and Portugal.

== College career ==
He is a graduate of the California State Polytechnic University, Pomona, getting his Bachelor of Science degree in kinesiology with an emphasis in Exercise Science. He also played his collegiate career at Cal Poly Pomona from 2005 to 2009, earnings several honors. Became the first freshman Men's Basketball player to receive Freshman of the year honors in 2005–2006 season.

He is currently the All-Time Leading Rebounder in school history as well as the 2nd All-Time leading scorer is school history. During his senior year, he led his team to the NCAA Men's Division II Basketball Championship Game for the first time in school history and was named an NABC All-American to become just the 4th All-American in Men's Basketball. He was also named Player of the Year of the CCAA an NCAA Division II Conference and West Region MVP.

== Professional career ==
In the Fall of 2009, Gordon started off his rookie basketball career in the Netherlands playing in the top Dutch Basketball League for Landstede Basketbal and finished the season averaging 14 points, 8.1 rebounds, 1.8 assists and 1.2 steals per game.

He then played two seasons (2010–2012) in the top league in Austria in the Austrian Bundesliga for the Kapfenberg Bulls. In the season 2010–2011 he helped the Kapfenberg Bulls make the playoffs but their season ended in the first round. Gordon averaged 10.4 points, 5.9 rebounds and 1.6 assists per game. He shot an impressive 53.8% from the field. He also recorded a career-high 22 rebounds in a single game and was crowned the Austrian Dunk Contest Champion, which highlighted his season. In the 2011–2012 season he again helped the Kapfenberg Bulls make the playoffs and the season ended in the semi-finals, with the Bulls losing the series 3–2 in a best of five. Gordon improved his statically contribution averaging 14.7 points, 8.4 rebounds and 1.8 assists per game, while shooting a very impressive 65.2% from the field.

In August 2012 Gordon signed with German Club Phoenix Hagen where he played 3 consecutive seasons (2012–2015). In the 2012–2013 season he averaged 11.9 points, 6.4 rebounds, 1.5 assists and 1.0 steal per game, while helping Hagen make the playoffs. The season ended in the quarterfinals with Hagen losing the series 3–1 in a best of five to the eventual German Champions Brose Baskets Bamberg. He also participated in the Three Point Contest & Dunk Contest during the German All Star weekend for his exceptional shooting from behind the arc (43%). In the 2013–2014 season was his best season in Germany with him averaging 15.6 points, 7.6 rebounds, 1.6 assists and 1.1 steals per game. Gordon led the German Bundesliga in Rebounding this season. He was also selected as an All Star this season for his exceptional play and for the Dunk Contest for his high flying ability during this season. In his last season with Hagen, 2014–2015, Gordon averaged 14 points, 6.2 rebounds, 1.7 assists and 1.4 steals per game.

On August 3, 2015, Gordon signed with German club Eisbären Bremerhaven for the 2015–16 season. Gordon had a decent year averaging 10.1 points, 5.4 rebounds and 1.4 assists per game. He shot an impressive 42.6% from behind the arc and 57.8% from the field.

The 2016–17 season Gordon started in South Korea with Busan KT Sonicboom, where he averaged 14.9 points, 6 rebounds, 2.1 assists and 1.3 steals per game. On December 30, 2016, he returned to Germany to sign with SC Rasta Vechta. In Vechta, Gordon had a sub par half season averaging 6.5 points, 3 rebounds and 2.1 assists per game in 15 games.

On August 7, 2017, Gordon signed with the Kazakh team Astana for the 2017–18 season playing the VTB United League. Gordon put up a decent year while averaging 8.4 points, 3.9 rebounds, 1.4 assists and 1.0 steals per game in 22 VTB League games. Gordon won the Kazakhstan League and the Kazakhstan Cup titles with Astana. He averaged 14.6 points, 8.0 rebounds, 4.4 assists and 2.1 steals per game in 8 Kazakh League games.

On June 25, 2018, Gordon returned to Germany for a third stint, signing a one-year deal with Gießen 46ers. In 34 games played for Gießen, he averaged 11 points, 5.8 rebounds and 1.9 assists per game, while shooting 41.2 percent from three-point range and 57.2 percent from the field.

On July 29, 2019, Gordon signed a one-year deal with Hapoel Eilat of the Israeli Premier League. On January 12, 2020, Gordon parted ways with Eilat after appearing in 13 league games.

In 2020–21, he played at FC Porto, Gordon had an impressive year with the Portuguese powerhouse, averaging 13.0 points per game, 6.6 rebounds and 2.1 assist per game. He won the Portuguese Cup and helped FC Porto advance to the Finals, were Porto loss 4–3 in a 7-game series against their rivals Lisboa Sporting. Gordon retired as a professional basketball player in the summer of 2021.

== The Basketball Tournament (TBT) ==
In the summer of 2017, Gordon played in The Basketball Tournament on ESPN for Team Challenge ALS. He competed for the $2 million prize in 2017, and for Team Challenge ALS, he averaged 4.2 rebounds per game. Gordon helped take the sixth-seeded Team Challenge ALS to the Championship Game of the tournament, where they lost in a close game to Overseas Elite 86–83.

In TBT 2018, Gordon averaged 2.0 points per game and 2.3 rebounds per game on 67 percent shooting for Team Challenge ALS. They reached the West Regional Championship Game before losing to eventual tournament runner-up Eberlein Drive.
