= Immanuel McElroy =

American basketball player

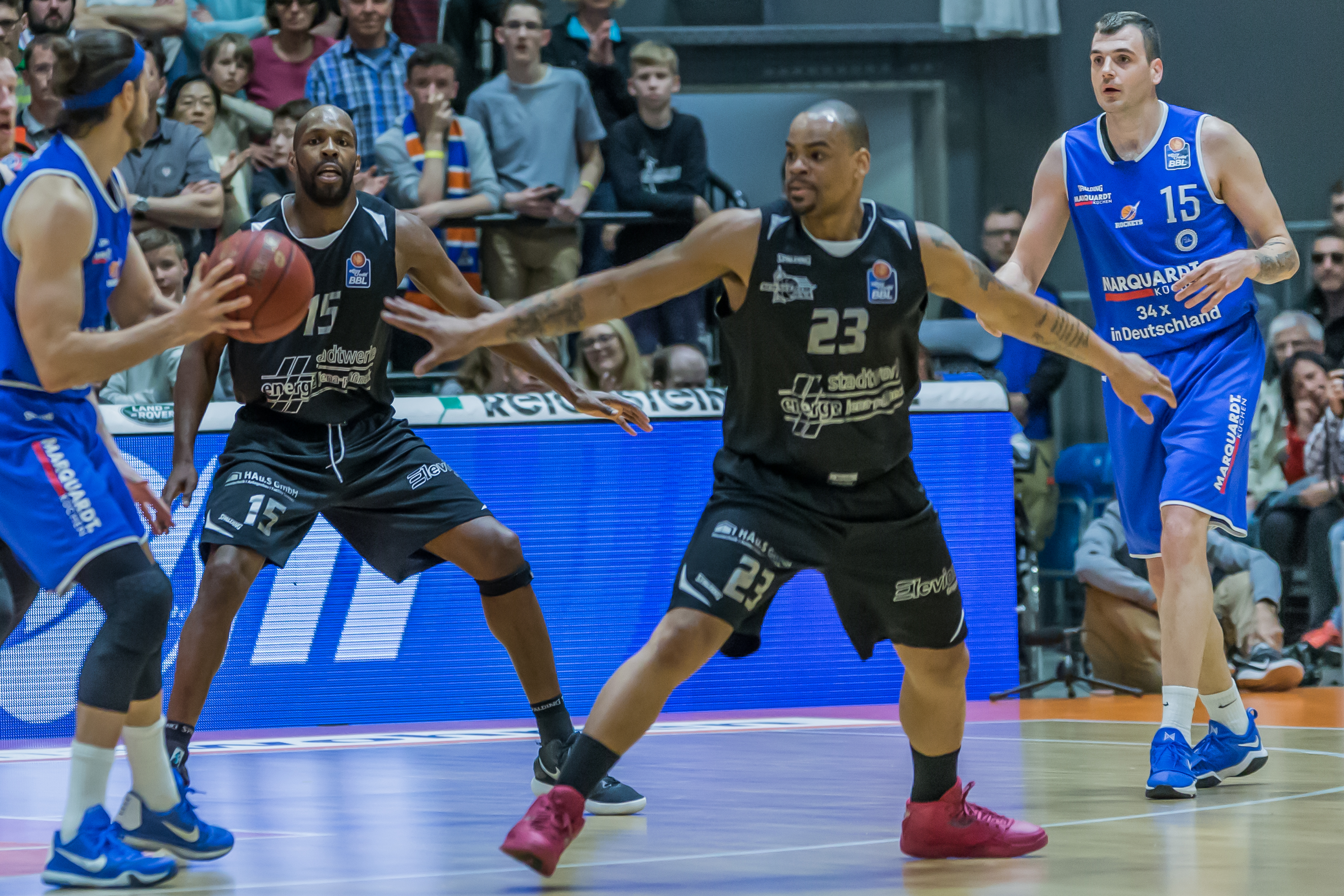
- McElroy (#23)

Personal information
- Born: March 25, 1980 (age 46) Galveston, Texas, U.S.
- Listed height: 6 ft 4.5 in (1.94 m)
- Listed weight: 210 lb (95 kg)

Career information
- High school: Lincoln (Port Arthur, Texas)
- College: Tyler JC (1998–2000); Cincinnati (2000–2002)
- NBA draft: 2002: undrafted
- Playing career: 2002–2020
- Position: Point guard / shooting guard

Career history
- 2002–2003: Grand Rapids Hoops
- 2003: Dodge City Legend
- 2003–2004: Gary Steelheads
- 2004: Dodge City Legend
- 2004–2008: RheinEnergie Cologne
- 2008–2011: ALBA Berlin
- 2011–2015: Phantoms / Löwen Braunschweig
- 2015–2020: Science City Jena

Career highlights
- CBA All-Defensive Team (2004); CBA Rookie of the Year (2003); CBA All-Rookie Team (2003); USBL Defensive Player of the Year (2004); German Bundesliga Finals MVP (2006); 5× German Bundesliga Best Defender (2007–2011); All-EuroCup Team (2010); 4× All-German Bundesliga First Team (2007–2010)

Immanuel Jarod McElroy (born March 25, 1980) is an American former professional basketball player. He played as a point guard-shooting guard and small forward.

== College career ==
McElroy played college basketball at Tyler Junior College from 1998-00 and at the University of Cincinnati from 2000 to 2002.

== Professional career ==
In his professional career, McElroy has played with: the Grand Rapids Hoops, Dodge City Legend, Gary Steelheads, RheinEnergie Cologne, ALBA Berlin.

McElroy began his career in the Continental Basketball Association (CBA) and was named the CBA Rookie of the Year with the Grand Rapids Hoops in 2003. He moved to the Gary Steelheads of the CBA the following season and was selected to the CBA All-Defensive Team in 2004.

While playing for ALBA Berlin McElroy won the Best Defensive Player award of the German League 5 times in a row, from 2007 till 2011. In July 2011 he signed a two-year contract with New Yorker Phantoms, later the Löwen Braunschweig.
