= 2019 FIBA Europe Cup Finals =

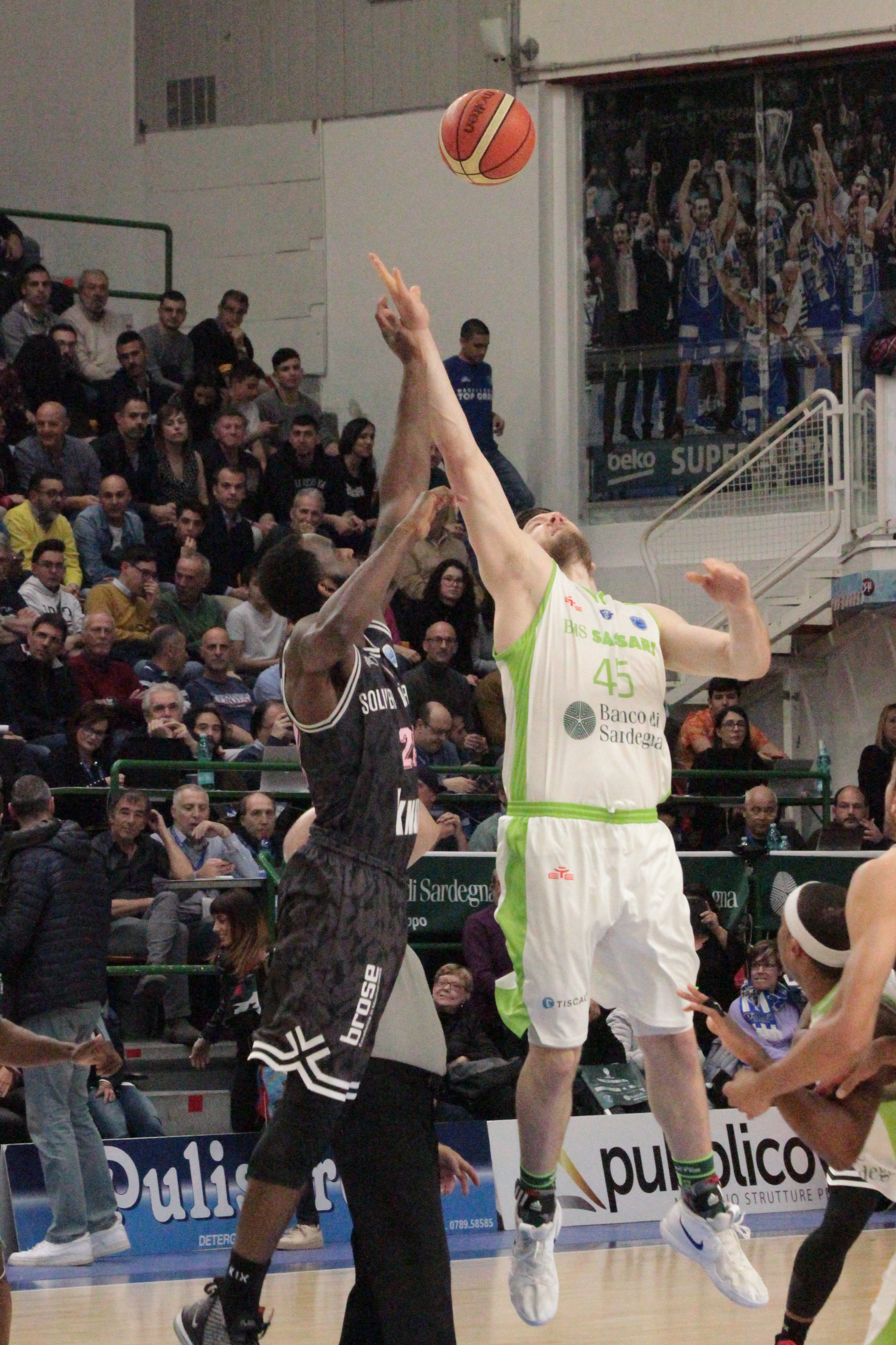
- The tip off of the first leg
- Event: 2018–19 FIBA Europe Cup
Dinamo Sassari	s.Oliver Würzburg
(Italy)	(Germany)
170	163

First leg
Dinamo Sassari	s.Oliver Würzburg
89	84
- Date: 24 April 2019
- Venue: Roberta Serradimigni, Sassari
- Attendance: 5,000

Second leg
s.Oliver Würzburg	Dinamo Sassari
79	81
- Date: 1 May 2019
- Venue: s.Oliver Arena, Würzburg
- Attendance: 3,140

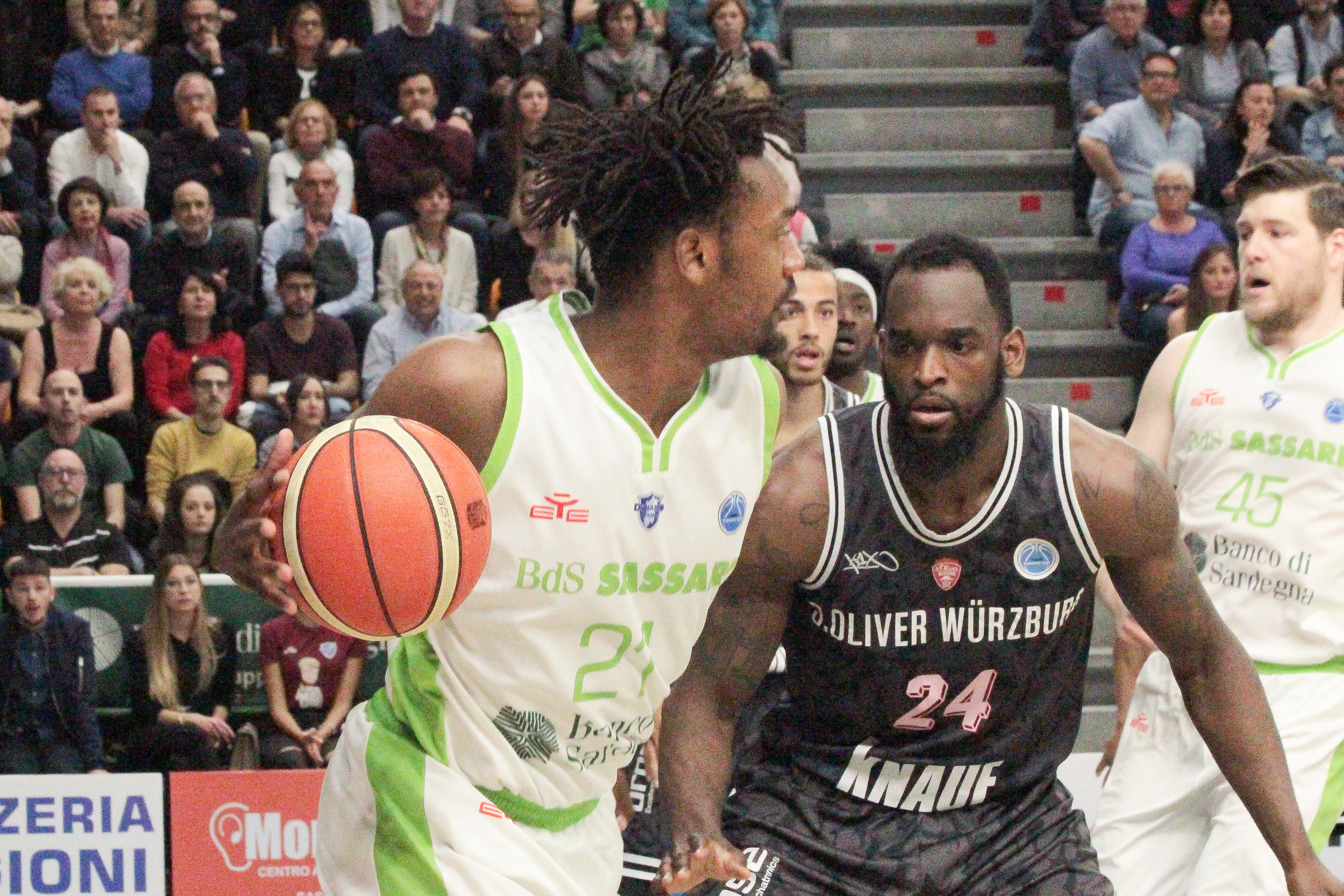
Dyshawn Pierre guarded by Mike Morrison in the first leg

The 2019 FIBA Europe Cup Finals were the concluding games of the 2018–19 FIBA Europe Cup season. The Finals will be played in a two-legged format, with the first leg being played on April 24 and the second one on 1 May 2019. The finals were played between Dinamo Sassari and s.Oliver Würzburg. Both teams appeared in their first FIBA Europe Cup final, as well as their first European final.

Dinamo won its first European championship after defeating Würzburg in both legs.

== Venue ==
Sassari	2019 FIBA Europe Cup Finals (Europe)	Würzburg
Palasport Roberta Serradimigni	2019 FIBA Europe Cup Finals (Europe)	s.Oliver Arena
Capacity: 5,000	2019 FIBA Europe Cup Finals (Europe)	Capacity: 4,756

== Road to the Finals ==
Note: In the table, the score of the finalist is given first (H = home; A = away).

(Italy) Dinamo Sassari				Round	(Germany) s.Oliver Würzburg			
(Portugal) Benfica	211–158	100–66 (H)	111–92 (A)	Second qualifying round				
Group H: Pos / Team / Pld / Pts; 1 / (Hungary) Szolnoki Olaj / 6 / 11; 2 / (Italy) Dinamo Sassari / 6 / 11; 3 / (Hungary) Falco Vulcano / 6 / 8; 4 / (United Kingdom) Leicester Riders / 6 / 6; Source: FIBA Europe Cup				Regular season	Group A: Pos / Team / Pld / Pts; 1 / (Germany) s.Oliver Würzburg / 6 / 10; 2 / (Netherlands) ZZ Leiden / 6 / 10; 3 / (Turkey) Sakarya Büyükşehir / 6 / 9; 4 / (Romania) Oradea / 6 / 7; Source: FIBA Europe Cup			
Group K: Pos / Team / Pld / Pts; 1 / (Italy) Dinamo Sassari / 6 / 11; 2 / (Italy) Varese / 6 / 10; 3 / (Netherlands) Donar / 6 / 8; 4 / (Cyprus) Petrolina AEK Larnaca / 6 / 7; Source: FIBA Europe Cup				Second round	Group I: Pos / Team / Pld / Pts; 1 / (Germany) s.Oliver Würzburg / 6 / 12; 2 / (Turkey) Pınar Karşıyaka / 6 / 9; 3 / (Kosovo) Z-Mobile Prishtina / 6 / 8; 4 / (Hungary) Szolnoki Olaj / 6 / 7; Source: FIBA Europe Cup			
Opponent	Agg.	1st leg	2nd leg	Play-offs	Opponent	Agg.	1st leg	2nd leg
(Netherlands) ZZ Leiden	191–161	93–97 (A)	94–68 (H)	Round of 16	(Russia) Avtodor	173–166	76–79 (A)	94–90 (H)
(Turkey) Pınar Karşıyaka	170–151	68–87 (A)	83–83 (H)	Quarterfinals	(Denmark) Bakken Bears	161–146	76–75 (A)	86–70 (H)
(Israel) Hapoel Holon	199–164	89–94 (A)	105–75 (H)	Semifinals	(Italy) Varese	178–152	66–89 (A)	89–86 (H)

== First leg ==
24 April 2019	Dinamo Sassari (Italy)	89–84	(Germany) s.Oliver Würzburg	Sassari, Italy
20:30 (UTC+2)	Scoring by quarter: 24–22, 21–23, 20–22, 24–17
	Pts: Thomas 27; Rebs: Thomas 11; Asts: Spissu 6 Eff: Thomas 31	Boxscore	Pts: Wells 22; Rebs: Oliver 8 Asts: Bowlin 6 Eff: Wells 24	Arena: Roberta Serradimigni; Attendance: 5,000; Referees: Srđan Dožai (CRO), Tanel Suslov (EST), Alexey Davydov (RUS)

Starters:			Pts	Reb	Ast
PG	2	(United States) Jaime Smith	9	1	5
SG	3	(United States) Tyrus McGee	10	6	2
SF	21	(Canada) Dyshawn Pierre	2	2	2
PF	25	(United States) Rashawn Thomas	27	11	2
C	45	(United States) Jack Cooley	12	5	0
Reserves:					
G	0	(Italy) Marco Spissu	DNP		
G	1	(Italy) Marco Antonio Re	DNP		
G	6	(United States) Justin Carter	2	1	0
G	8	(Italy) Giacomo Devecchi	0	0	0
C	15	(Italy) Daniele Magro	DNP		
G	22	(Italy) Stefano Gentile	0	0	0
F	33	(Italy) Achille Polonara	13	8	2
Head coach:
(Italian Basketball Federation) Gianmarco Pozzecco

Sassari	Würzburg

Sassari	Statistics	Würzburg
20/43 (47%)	2-pt field goals	28/41 (68%)
11/24 (46%)	3-pt field goals	7/23 (30%)
16/20 (80%)	Free throws	7/11 (64%)
12	Offensive rebounds	7
24	Defensive rebounds	26
36	Total rebounds	33
19	Assists	24
11	Turnovers	12
9	Steals	7
3	Blocks	2
20	Fouls	21

Starters:			Pts	Reb	Ast
PG	12	(United States) Skyler Bowlin	5	2	12
SG	9	(Australia) Xavier Cooks	19	5	1
SF	23	(United States) Devin Oliver	17	8	1
PF	22	(United States) Cameron Wells	22	1	6
C	24	(United States) Mike Morrison	9	3	1
Reserves:					
C	0	(United Kingdom) Gabe Olaseni	0	4	0
G	1	(United States) Jordan Hulls	10	5	2
G	3	(Germany) Joshua Obiesie	DNP		
G	6	(Germany) Philipp Hadenfeldt	DNP		
F	20	(Germany) Julian Albus	DNP		
F	21	(Germany) Florian Koch	2	2	1
F	34	(Germany) Felix Hoffmann	0	0	0
Head coach:
(German Basketball Federation) Denis Wucherer

- Team captains (C): (Italy) Giacomo Devecchi (Dinamo Sassari) and (Serbia) Krešimir Lončar (Würzburg )

== Second leg ==
1 May 2019	s.Oliver Würzburg (Germany)	79–81 (163–170 agg.)	(Italy) Dinamo Sassari	Würzburg, Germany
17:00 (UTC+2)	Scoring by quarter: 26–19, 20–22, 19–23, 14–17
	Pts: Bowlin 20; Rebs: Oliver 11; Asts: Wells 10; Eff: Wells 21	Boxscore	Pts: Pierre 19; Rebs: Polonara 9 Asts: Smith, Thomas 3 Eff: Pierre 20	Arena: s.Oliver Arena; Attendance: 3,140; Referees: Panagiotis Anastopoulos (GRE), Andris Aunkrogers (LAT), Martin Horozov (BUL)

Starters:			Pts	Reb	Ast
PG	9	(Australia) Xavier Cooks	5	3	1
SG	12	(United States) Skyler Bowlin	20	1	5
SF	22	(United States) Cameron Wells	18	2	10
PF	23	(United States) Devin Oliver	12	11	1
C	24	(United States) Mike Morrison	9	4	0
Reserves:					
C	0	(United Kingdom) Gabe Olaseni	8	1	0
G	1	(United States) Jordan Hulls	DNP		
G	3	(Germany) Joshua Obiesie	DNP		
G	6	(Germany) Philipp Hadenfeldt	DNP		
F	20	(Germany) Julian Albus	DNP		
F	21	(Germany) Florian Koch	7	3	0
F	34	(Germany) Felix Hoffmann	0	0	0
Head coach:
(German Basketball Federation) Denis Wucherer

Würzburg	Sassari

Würzburg	Statistics	Sassari
20/32 (63%)	2-pt field goals	26/39 (67%)
8/29 (28%)	3-pt field goals	5/23 (22%)
15/20 (75%)	Free throws	14/21 (67%)
8	Offensive rebounds	11
23	Defensive rebounds	25
31	Total rebounds	36
18	Assists	12
12	Turnovers	11
8	Steals	7
0	Blocks	1
21	Fouls	21

Starters:			Pts	Reb	Ast
PG	2	(United States) Jaime Smith	15	5	3
SG	3	(United States) Tyrus McGee	8	1	2
SF	21	(Canada) Dyshawn Pierre	19	7	1
PF	25	(United States) Rashawn Thomas	14	5	3
C	45	(United States) Jack Cooley	4	4	0
Reserves:					
G	0	(Italy) Marco Spissu	4	3	0
G	1	(Italy) Marco Antonio Re	DNP		
G	6	(United States) Justin Carter	1	1	1
G	8	(Italy) Giacomo Devecchi	DNP		
C	15	(Italy) Daniele Magro	DNP		
G	22	(Italy) Stefano Gentile	10	0	0
F	33	(Italy) Achille Polonara	6	9	1
Head coach:
(Italian Basketball Federation) Gianmarco Pozzecco

- Team captains (C): (Serbia) Krešimir Lončar (Würzburg) and (Italy) Giacomo Devecchi (Dinamo Sassari)

== See also ==
- 2019 EuroLeague Final Four
- 2019 EuroCup Finals
- 2019 Basketball Champions League Final Four
