= 2018–19 FIBA Europe Cup Play-offs =

Sport season

The 2018–19 FIBA Europe Cup play-offs will begin on 6 March and conclude on 24 April and 1 May 2019 with the 2019 FIBA Europe Cup Finals, to decide the champions of the 2018–19 FIBA Europe Cup. A total of 16 teams will compete in the play-offs.

== Format ==
Each tie in the knockout phase, is played over two legs, with each team playing one leg at home.

The draw was made with the only restriction that these lucky losers could not be paired against each other, being decided all the bracket by the luck of the draw in the round of 16.

== Qualified teams ==
=== Second round group winners and runners-up ===
The four group winners and second-placed teams from the second round advanced to the play-offs. In case of vacants due to opt-out options of teams transferred from the Basketball Champions League, these places would be filled with the best third-qualified teams.

Group	Winners	Runners-up	Third
I	(Germany) s.Oliver Würzburg	(Turkey) Pınar Karşıyaka	(Kosovo) Z-Mobile Prishtina
J	(Israel) Ironi Nes Ziona	(Bulgaria) Balkan	(Hungary) Alba Fehérvár
K	(Italy) Dinamo Sassari	(Italy) Varese	(Netherlands) Donar
L	(Russia) Avtodor	(Denmark) Bakken Bears	(Netherlands) ZZ Leiden

==== Standings ====
Pos	Grp	Team	Pld	W	L	PF	PA	PD
1	I	(Germany) s.Oliver Würzburg	6	6	0	596	487	+109
2	L	(Russia) Avtodor	6	5	1	576	482	+94
3	K	(Italy) Dinamo Sassari	6	5	1	536	481	+55
4	K	(Italy) Varese	6	4	2	492	446	+46
5	J	(Israel) Ironi Nes Ziona	6	4	2	563	533	+30
6	L	(Denmark) Bakken Bears	6	3	3	586	503	+83
7	K	(Hungary) Alba Fehérvár	6	3	3	489	458	+31
8	I	(Turkey) Pınar Karşıyaka	6	3	3	539	532	+7
9	J	(Bulgaria) Balkan	6	3	3	496	499	−3
10	K	(Netherlands) Donar	6	2	4	447	467	−20
11	K	(Kosovo) Z-Mobile Prishtina	6	2	4	479	536	−57
12	L	(Netherlands) ZZ Leiden	6	2	4	480	562	−82

Source: FIBA Europe Cup

=== Transfers from Champions League regular season ===
Eight teams from the 2018–19 Basketball Champions League Regular season transfer to the FIBA Europe Cup. These include the fifth and sixth-placed teams. The clubs from Basketball Champions League Regular Season which had opt-out clauses from playing in the FIBA Europe Cup Play-offs and in the event of them claiming fifth or sixth place, their spot would be filled by the best-ranked third-placed teams from the Second Round. They will be ranked according to the FIBA Europe Cup regulations.

Group	Fifth place	Sixth place
A	(Italy) ~~Sidigas Scandone~~	(Latvia) Ventspils
B	(Israel) Hapoel Holon	(Germany) Telekom Baskets Bonn
C	(Lithuania) ~~Lietkabelis~~	(France) ~~JDA Dijon~~
D	(France) ~~SIG Strasbourg~~	(Belgium) Filou Oostende

==== Standings ====
Pos	Grp	Team	Pld	W	L	PF	PA	PD
1	B	(Israel) Hapoel Holon	14	7	7	1145	1117	+28
2	D	(Belgium) Filou Oostende	14	7	7	1071	1119	−48
3	A	(Latvia) Ventspils	14	6	8	1142	1178	−36
4	B	(Germany) Telekom Baskets Bonn	14	6	8	1120	1181	−61

Source: FIBA Europe Cup

== Bracket ==
Round of 16
(Israel) Hapoel Holon	85	82	167
(Bulgaria) Balkan	81	83	164
(Germany) Telekom Baskets	85	69	154
(Hungary) Alba Fehérvár	84	81	165
(Latvia) Ventspils	78	65	143
(Turkey) Pınar Karşıyaka	76	70	146
(Netherlands) ZZ Leiden	93	68	161
(Italy) Dinamo Sassari	97	94	191
(Netherlands) Donar	66	80	146
(Belgium) Filou Oostende	66	88	154
(Kosovo) Z-Mobile Prishtina	77	84	161
(Italy) Varese	80	100	180
(Denmark) Bakken Bears	91	81	172
(Israel) Ironi Nes Ziona	74	76	150
(Russia) Avtodor	76	90	166
(Germany) s.Oliver Würzburg	79	94	173

Quarter-finals
(Israel) Hapoel Holon	96	74	170
(Hungary) Alba Fehérvár	63	101	164
(Turkey) Pınar Karşıyaka	68	83	151
(Italy) Dinamo Sassari	87	83	170
(Belgium) Filou Oostende	70	57	127
(Italy) Varese	73	72	145
(Denmark) Bakken Bears	76	70	146
(Germany) s.Oliver Würzburg	75	86	161

Semi-finals
(Israel) Hapoel Holon	89	75	164
(Italy) Dinamo Sassari	94	105	199
(Italy) Varese	66	86	152
(Germany) s.Oliver Würzburg	89	89	178

Final
(Italy) Dinamo Sassari	89	81	170
(Germany) s.Oliver Würzburg	84	79	163

== Round of 16 ==
The first legs were played on 5–6 March, and the second legs were played on 12–13 March 2019. Team 2 played the second leg at home.

Team 1	Agg.	Team 2	1st leg	2nd leg
Donar (Netherlands)	146–154	(Belgium) Filou Oostende	66–66	80–88
Ventspils (Latvia)	143–146	(Turkey) Pınar Karşıyaka	78–76	65–70
Telekom Baskets Bonn (Germany)	154–165	(Hungary) Alba Fehérvár	85–84	69–81
Bakken Bears (Denmark)	172–150	(Israel) Ironi Nes Ziona	91–74	81–76
Avtodor (Russia)	166–173	(Germany) s.Oliver Würzburg	76–79	90–94
Hapoel Holon (Israel)	167–164	(Bulgaria) Balkan	85–81	82–83
ZZ Leiden (Netherlands)	161–191	(Italy) Dinamo Sassari	93–97	68–94
Z-Mobile Prishtina (Kosovo)	161–180	(Italy) Varese	77–80	84–100

Notes

1. Order of legs reversed after original draw, requested by Donar due to the no availability of their home arena for the second leg.

=== First leg ===
5 March 2019	Hapoel Holon (Israel)	85–81	(Bulgaria) Balkan	Holon
18:30	Scoring by quarter: 12–19, 26–26, 15–16, 32–20
	Pts: Walden 20; Rebs: Atkins 11; Asts: Reynolds 7 Eff: Walden 20	Boxscore	Pts: Brown 17; Rebs: Gavrilovic 12; Asts: Petkov 7 Eff: Gavrilovic, Hopkins 18	Arena: Toto Hall; Attendance: 2,300; Referees: Panagiotis Anastopoulos (GRE), Pavel Fuska (SVK), Kerem Baki (TUR)

5 March 2019	Donar (Netherlands)	66–66	(Belgium) Filou Oostende	Groningen
19:30	Scoring by quarter: 20–17, 15–18, 18–15, 13–16
	Pts: Gipson 13; Rebs: Jeter 6 Asts: Jeter, Slagter 3 Eff: Gipson 12	Boxscore	Pts: Đurišić 15; Rebs: Mwema 7 Asts: Fieler 6 Eff: Đurišić, Mwema 16	Arena: MartiniPlaza; Attendance: 3,040; Referees: Janusz Calik (POL), Steve Bittner (GER), Vladimir Jevtović (SRB)

6 March 2019	Avtodor (Russia)	76–79	(Germany) s.Oliver Würzburg	Saratov
16:00	Scoring by quarter: 24–23, 15–13, 17–23, 20–20
	Pts: Gordon 16; Rebs: Kravish 12; Asts: Gordon 10; Eff: Kravish 22	Boxscore	Pts: Cooks, Oliver 15; Rebs: Olaseni, Wells 8 Asts: Bowlin, Wells 8 Eff: Wells 22	Arena: Kristall Ice Sports Palace; Attendance: 2,000; Referees: Luka Kardum (CRO), Ilias Kounelles (CYP), Mehmet Karabilecen (TUR)

6 March 2019	Ventspils (Latvia)	78–76	(Turkey) Pınar Karşıyaka	Ventspils
18:00	Scoring by quarter: 16–17, 24–22, 19–24, 19–13
	Pts: Johnson 18; Rebs: Drame 9 Asts: Johnson 6 Eff: Johnson 23	Boxscore	Pts: Karaman 17; Rebs: Marei 8 Asts: Batuk 4 Eff: Marei 20	Arena: Ventspils Olympic Center; Attendance: 1,650; Referees: Andrei Sharapa (BLR), Marek Kúkelčík (SVK), Geert Jakobs (BEL)

6 March 2019	Bakken Bears (Denmark)	91–74	(Israel) Ironi Nes Ziona	Aarhus
18:30	Scoring by quarter: 17–22, 22–19, 28–14, 24–19
	Pts: Carberry 21; Rebs: Jukić 7 Asts: Darboe 7 Eff: Carberry 20	Boxscore	Pts: Zanna 19; Rebs: Kadir, Browne 7 Asts: Kadir, Browne 4 Eff: Zanna, Browne 15	Arena: Vejlby-Risskov Hallen; Attendance: 2,200; Referees: Apostolos Kalpakas (SWE), Petr Hrusa (CZE), Gvidas Gedvilas (LTU)

6 March 2019	Telekom Baskets Bonn (Germany)	85–84	(Hungary) Alba Fehérvár	Bonn
20:00	Scoring by quarter: 24–27, 16–23, 22–24, 23–10
	Pts: Birčević 19; Rebs: Webb 7 Asts: DiLeo 8 Eff: Birčević 25	Boxscore	Pts: Heath, Lóránt 21; Rebs: Heath 15; Asts: Zeno 5 Eff: Heath 38	Arena: Telekom Dome; Attendance: 3,010; Referees: Andris Aunkrogers (LAT), Sebastien Clivaz (SUI), Beniamino Manuel Attard (ITA)

6 March 2019	ZZ Leiden (Netherlands)	93–97	(Italy) Dinamo Sassari	Leiden
20:00	Scoring by quarter: 13–21, 26–21, 26–34, 28–21
	Pts: Watson, Thompson 25; Rebs: De Jong 6 Asts: Watson 7 Eff: Watson 32	Boxscore	Pts: Cooley 21; Rebs: Cooley 10; Asts: McGee 8 Eff: McGee 29	Arena: Vijf Meihal; Attendance: 3,000; Referees: Nicolas Maestre (FRA), Gatis Saliņš (LAT), Thomas Bissuel (FRA)

6 March 2019	Z-Mobile Prishtina (Kosovo)	77–80	(Italy) Varese	Pristina
20:30	Scoring by quarter: 12–25, 20–12, 28–15, 17–28
	Pts: Berisha 21; Rebs: Ahmed 8 Asts: Berisha 3 Eff: Ahmed, Myles 14	Boxscore	Pts: Archie 22; Rebs: Cain 9 Asts: Moore 6 Eff: Archie 17	Arena: Palace of Youth and Sports; Attendance: 3,000; Referees: Markos Michaelides (SUI), Kristaps Konstantinovs (LAT), Igor Mitrovski (MKD)

=== Second leg ===
12 March 2019	Balkan (Bulgaria)	83–82 (164–167 agg.)	(Israel) Hapoel Holon	Botevgrad
18:30	Scoring by quarter: 24–23, 20–27, 14–13, 25–19
	Pts: Hopkins 20; Rebs: Hopkins 15; Asts: three players 5 Eff: Hopkins 35	Boxscore	Pts: Atkins 20; Rebs: Walden, Jones 6 Asts: Pnini 7 Eff: Atkins 24	Arena: Arena Botevgrad; Referees: Marek Cmikiewicz (POL), Carsten Straube (GER), Goran Šljivić (AUT)

13 March 2019	Alba Fehérvár (Hungary)	81–69 (165–154 agg.)	(Germany) Telekom Baskets Bonn	Székesfehérvár
18:00	Scoring by quarter: 24–15, 13–19, 22–18, 22–17
	Pts: Cabezas 19; Rebs: Filipovity 7 Asts: Cabezas 5 Eff: Filipovity 23	Boxscore	Pts: Jackson 14; Rebs: Bartolo 7 Asts: Jackson 5 Eff: Jackson 22	Arena: Alba Regia Sportcsarnok; Referees: Tanel Suslov (EST), Luka Kardum (CRO), Martin Vulić (CRO)

13 March 2019	Pınar Karşıyaka (Turkey)	70–65 (146–143 agg.)	(Latvia) Ventspils	İzmir
18:30	Scoring by quarter: 17–14, 19–17, 17–9, 17–25
	Pts: Marei 23; Rebs: Marei 17; Asts: Henry, Batuk 5 Eff: Marei 34	Boxscore	Pts: Johnson 16; Rebs: Berzins, Gulbis 6 Asts: Johnson 9 Eff: Johnson 19	Arena: Karşıyaka Arena; Referees: Siniša Herceg (CRO), Saša Maričić (SRB), Radomir Vojinović (MNE)

13 March 2019	Filou Oostende (Belgium)	88–80 (154–146 agg.)	(Netherlands) Donar	Ostend
19:00	Scoring by quarter: 28–21, 15–20, 23–23, 22–16
	Pts: three players 15; Rebs: Mwema 6 Asts: Fieler 5 Eff: Williams, Fieler 15	Boxscore	Pts: Jeter 17; Rebs: Koenis 8 Asts: three players 3 Eff: Koenis 16	Arena: Sleuyter Arena; Referees: Apostolos Kalpakas (SWE), Petr Hrůša (CZE), Andrei Sharapa (BLR)

13 March 2019	Ironi Nes Ziona (Israel)	76–81 (150–172 agg.)	(Denmark) Bakken Bears	Ness Ziona
19:00	Scoring by quarter: 21–20, 19–11, 11–20, 25–30
	Pts: Gutt, Cook 19; Rebs: Gutt 13; Asts: Browne 6 Eff: Gutt 27	Boxscore	Pts: Evans 13; Rebs: Diouf 11; Asts: Jukić, Carberry 5 Eff: Diouf 19	Arena: Lev Hamoshava; Referees: Zafer Yılmaz (TUR), Alexey Davydov (RUS), Ventsislav Velikov (BUL)

13 March 2019	s.Oliver Würzburg (Germany)	94–90 (173–166 agg.)	(Russia) Avtodor	Würzburg
19:00	Scoring by quarter: 12–23, 29–25, 31–24, 22–18
	Pts: Richter 16; Rebs: Morrison 10; Asts: Cooks 8 Eff: Oliver, Morrison 18	Boxscore	Pts: Golden 24; Rebs: Savović 12; Asts: Ireland 8 Eff: Golden 27	Arena: s.Oliver Arena; Referees: Markos Michaelides (SUI), Vilius Mačiulaitis (LTU), Valerio Grigioni (ITA)

13 March 2019	Dinamo Sassari (Italy)	94–68 (191–161 agg.)	(Netherlands) ZZ Leiden	Sassari
20:30	Scoring by quarter: 25–22, 17–17, 20–12, 32–17
	Pts: Thomas 40; Rebs: Thomas 16; Asts: Smith 6 Eff: Thomas 54	Boxscore	Pts: Thompson 21; Rebs: Thompson 11; Asts: Watson 8 Eff: Thompson 26	Arena: Roberta Serradimigni; Referees: Marek Maliszewski (POL), Ivor Matějek (CZE), Charalampos Karakatsounis (GRE)

13 March 2019	Varese (Italy)	100–84 (180–161 agg.)	(Kosovo) Z-Mobile Prishtina	Varese
20:30	Scoring by quarter: 33–21, 23–19, 21–19, 23–25
	Pts: Avramović 18; Rebs: Cain 9 Asts: Avramović 7 Eff: Avramović 23	Boxscore	Pts: Berisha 24; Rebs: Ahmed 7 Asts: Myles, Berisha 4 Eff: Myles 19	Arena: Enerxenia Arena; Referees: Dariusz Zapolski (POL), Zdenko Tomašovič (SVK), Sebastien Clivaz (SUI)

== Quarterfinals ==
The first legs were played on 20 March, and the second legs were played on 27 March 2019. Team 2 played the second leg at home.

Team 1	Agg.	Team 2	1st leg	2nd leg
Filou Oostende (Belgium)	127–145	(Italy) Varese	70–73	57–72
Pınar Karşıyaka (Turkey)	151–170	(Italy) Dinamo Sassari	68–87	83–83
Hapoel Holon (Israel)	170–164	(Hungary) Alba Fehérvár	96–63	74–101
Bakken Bears (Denmark)	146–161	(Germany) s.Oliver Würzburg	76–75	70–86

=== First leg ===
20 March 2019	Hapoel Holon (Israel)	96–63	(Hungary) Alba Fehérvár	Holon
18:00	Scoring by quarter: 18–23, 30–18, 20–13, 28–11
	Pts: Jones 22; Rebs: Atkins 7 Asts: Pnini 9 Eff: Atkins 26	Boxscore	Pts: Lóránt 22; Rebs: Lóránt 9 Asts: four players 3 Eff: Lóránt 28	Arena: Toto Hall; Referees: Sergiy Zashchuk (UKR), Charalampos Karakatsounis (GRE), Steve Bittner (GER)

20 March 2019	Pınar Karşıyaka (Turkey)	68–87	(Italy) Dinamo Sassari	İzmir
18:30	Scoring by quarter: 14–16, 15–20, 23–30, 16–21
	Pts: Henry 19; Rebs: Karaman, Marei 7 Asts: Henry 5 Eff: Henry 21	Boxscore	Pts: Cooley 26; Rebs: Cooley 11; Asts: Smith 6 Eff: Cooley 32	Arena: Karşıyaka Arena; Referees: Panagiotis Anastopoulos (GRE), Zdravko Rutešić (MNE), Martin Horozov (BUL)

20 March 2019	Bakken Bears (Denmark)	76–75	(Germany) s.Oliver Würzburg	Aarhus
18:30	Scoring by quarter: 19–17, 21–29, 24–17, 12–12
	Pts: Carberry 15; Rebs: Evans 10; Asts: Darboe, Carberry 4 Eff: Carberry 20	Boxscore	Pts: Oliver 17; Rebs: Olaseni 13; Asts: Wells 5 Eff: Oliver 23	Arena: Vejlby-Risskov Hallen; Referees: Oskars Lucis (LAT), Haris Bijedić (BIH), Mart Uuehendrik (EST)

20 March 2019	Filou Oostende (Belgium)	70–73	(Italy) Varese	Ostend
19:00	Scoring by quarter: 17–21, 16–22, 17–11, 20–19
	Pts: Fieler 20; Rebs: Fieler 9 Asts: Fieler 4 Eff: Fieler 26	Boxscore	Pts: Avramović 22; Rebs: Cain 7 Asts: Moore 4 Eff: Avramović, Scrubb 17	Arena: Sleuyter Arena; Referees: Georgios Poursanidis (GRE), Vilius Mačiulaitis (LTU), Ventsislav Velikov (BUL)

=== Second leg ===
26 March 2019	Alba Fehérvár (Hungary)	101–74(OT) (164–170 agg.)	(Israel) Hapoel Holon	Székesfehérvár
18:00	Scoring by quarter: 18–13, 24–20, 23–20, 31–10, Overtime: 5–11
	Pts: Freeman 19; Rebs: Heath 7 Asts: three players 5 Eff: Heath 27	Boxscore	Pts: Walden 24; Rebs: three players 5 Asts: Walden 8 Eff: Walden 30	Arena: Alba Regia Sportcsarnok; Referees: Siniša Herceg (CRO), Markos Michaelides (SUI), Kristaps Konstantinovs (LAT)

27 March 2019	s.Oliver Würzburg (Germany)	86–70 (161–146 agg.)	(Denmark) Bakken Bears	Würzburg
19:00	Scoring by quarter: 23–27, 24–9, 25–19, 14–15
	Pts: Hulls 19; Rebs: Cooks, Oliver 9 Asts: Hulls, Wells 5 Eff: Hulls 24	Boxscore	Pts: Ongwae, Diouf 15; Rebs: Ongwae, Carberry 6 Asts: Carberry 5 Eff: Ongwae, Carberry 17	Arena: s.Oliver Arena; Referees: Srđan Dožai (CRO), Saša Maričić (SRB), Kerem Baki (TUR)

27 March 2019	Varese (Italy)	72–57 (145–127 agg.)	(Belgium) Filou Oostende	Varese
20:30	Scoring by quarter: 18–15, 10–9, 27–14, 17–19
	Pts: Avramović 19; Rebs: Cain 9 Asts: Cain, Avramović 4 Eff: Moore 18	Boxscore	Pts: Schwartz 12; Rebs: Mwema 11; Asts: Lambrecht 2 Eff: Schwartz 13	Arena: Enerxenia Arena; Referees: Yener Yılmaz (TUR), Alexey Davydov (RUS), Ivor Matějek (CZE)

27 March 2019	Dinamo Sassari (Italy)	83–83 (170–151 agg.)	(Turkey) Pınar Karşıyaka	Sassari
20:30	Scoring by quarter: 12–23, 16–29, 22–17, 33–14
	Pts: Spissu, Polonara 14; Rebs: Cooley 9 Asts: Pierre 4 Eff: Polonara, Pierre 17	Boxscore	Pts: Henry 24; Rebs: Marei 15; Asts: Henry 5 Eff: Henry 22	Arena: Roberta Serradimigni; Referees: Marek Ćmikiewicz (POL), Zdenko Tomašovič (SVK), Dariusz Zapolski (POL)

== Semifinals ==
The first legs were played on 10 April, and the second legs were played on 17 April 2019. Team 2 played the second leg at home.

Team 1	Agg.	Team 2	1st leg	2nd leg
Varese (Italy)	152–178	(Germany) s.Oliver Würzburg	66–89	86–89
Hapoel Holon (Israel)	164–199	(Italy) Dinamo Sassari	89–94	75–105

=== First leg ===
10 April 2019	Hapoel Holon (Israel)	89–94	(Italy) Dinamo Sassari	Holon
18:45	Scoring by quarter: 25–22, 22–26, 25–20, 17–26
	Pts: Walden 26; Rebs: Atkins 9 Asts: Reynolds 8 Eff: Walden 32	Boxscore	Pts: Thomas 21; Rebs: Thomas 7 Asts: Smith 9 Eff: Thomas 24	Arena: Toto Hall; Referees: Yohan Rosso (FRA), Fernando Calatrava (ESP), Wojciech Liszka (POL)

10 April 2019	Varese (Italy)	66–89	(Germany) s.Oliver Würzburg	Varese
20:30	Scoring by quarter: 21–23, 12–23, 18–22, 15–21
	Pts: Cain 15; Rebs: Cain 9 Asts: Moore 4 Eff: Cain 26	Boxscore	Pts: Hulls 19; Rebs: Morrison 8 Asts: Hulls 5 Eff: Hulls 24	Arena: Enerxenia Arena; Referees: Sergiy Zashchuk (UKR), Radomir Vojinović (MNE), Michal Proc (POL)

=== Second leg ===
17 April 2019	s.Oliver Würzburg (Germany)	89–86 (178–152 agg.)	(Italy) Varese	Würzburg
19:00	Scoring by quarter: 30–11, 16–21, 29–27, 14–27
	Pts: Hulls, Wells 13; Rebs: Cooks 9 Asts: Hulls 5 Eff: Cooks 19	Boxscore	Pts: Scrubb 29; Rebs: Cain 9 Asts: Tambone 6 Eff: Scrubb 28	Arena: s.Oliver Arena; Referees: Marius Ciulin (ROU), Janusz Calik (POL), Boris Krejič (SLO)

17 April 2019	Dinamo Sassari (Italy)	105–75 (199–164 agg.)	(Israel) Hapoel Holon	Sassari
20:30	Scoring by quarter: 28–18, 34–20, 26–23, 17–14
	Pts: Polonara 17; Rebs: Thomas 12; Asts: Smith 10; Eff: Polonara 23	Boxscore	Pts: Walden 19; Rebs: Simhon 10; Asts: Walden, Reynolds 4 Eff: Walden 16	Arena: Roberta Serradimigni; Referees: Georgios Poursanidis (GRE), Gentian Cici (ALB), Oskars Lucis (LAT)

== Final ==
The first legs will be played on 24 April, and the second legs will be played on 1 May 2019. Team 2 plays the second leg at home.

Team 1	Agg.	Team 2	1st leg	2nd leg
Dinamo Sassari (Italy)	170–163	(Germany) s.Oliver Würzburg	89–84	81–79
