= Felix Hoffmann (disambiguation) =

Felix Hoffmann (1868–1946) was a German chemist.

Felix Hoffmann may also refer to:

- Felix Hoffmann (basketball) (born 1989), German basketball player
- Felix Hoffmann (illustrator) (1911–1975), Swiss graphic designer, illustrator, and stained glass artist
- Felix Hoffmann (ski jumper) (born 14 October 1997), German ski jumper
