= Dominique Archie =

American basketball player

Personal information
- Born: August 19, 1987 (age 39) Augusta, Georgia
- Listed height: 6 ft 7 in (2.01 m)
- Listed weight: 205 lb (93 kg)

Career information
- High school: T. W. Josey (Augusta, Georgia)
- College: South Carolina (2005–2010)
- NBA draft: 2010: undrafted
- Playing career: 2010–2022
- Position: Forward

Career history
- 2010–2011: Austin Toros
- 2011–2013: Timișoara
- 2013–2015: Orlandina Basket
- 2015–2016: Oostende
- 2016–2017: Orlandina Basket
- 2017–2018: Bnei Herzliya
- 2018–2019: Pallacanestro Varese
- 2019–2021: Champagne Châlons-Reims
- 2021: Ottawa Blackjacks
- 2021–2022: Élan Béarnais Pau-Orthez

Career highlights
- French Cup champion (2022); 2× Belgian League champion (2015, 2016); Belgian Cup Winner (2016); Second-Team All-SEC (2009); SEC All-Defensive Team (2009); SEC All-Freshman Team (2007)

Dominique Archie (born August 19, 1987) is an American former professional basketball player He played college basketball for the University of South Carolina before playing professionally in the D-League and later in Romania, Italy, Belgium and Israel.

== Early life and college career ==
Archie attended T. W. Josey High School in Augusta, Georgia. He played college basketball for the South Carolina Gamecocks.

As a freshman in college, Archie was named to the All-Freshman Team of the Southeastern Conference. In his junior year, Archie was named to the All-SEC Second Team and also to the SEC All-Defensive team.

== Professional career ==
On November 1, 2010, Archie was selected with the 14th overall pick in the 2010 NBA D-League by the Austin Toros. On January 6, 2011, The Austin Toros placed Archie on waivers due to injury.

On July 18, 2011, Archie signed a two-year deal with the Romanian team Timișoara. In his first year with the team, he helped Timișoara reach the 2012 Romanian League Finals, where they eventually lost to CSU Ploiești.

On July 15, 2013, Archie signed with the Italian team Orlandina Basket for the 2013–14 season. That season, Archie led Orlandina win the 2014 Serie A2 Championship, earning a promotion to the Serie A.

On July 21, 2014, Archie signed a two-year contract extension with Orlandina. However, On April 12, 2015, Archie parted ways with Orlandina to join the Belgian team Oostende for the remainder of the season. Archie helped Oostende win the 2015 Belgian League Championship.

On June 5, 2015, Archie signed a one-year contract extension with Oostende. That season, Archie helped Oostende win the Belgian League Championship and the Belgian Cup titles.

On June 17, 2016, Archie returned to Orlandina for a second stint, signing a one-year contract.

On June 17, 2017, Archie signed with the Israeli team Bnei Herzliya for the 2017–18 season. On April 30, 2018, Archie recorded a season-high 22 points, shooting 6-of-7 from three-point range, along with five rebounds, two steals and two assists in an 82–83 loss to Ironi Nahariya.

On June 13, 2018, Archie returned to Italy for a third stint, signing a one-year deal with Pallacanestro Varese. On March 31, 2019, Archie recorded a season-high 24 points, shooting 10-of-12 from the field, along with three rebounds, leading Varese to an 87–79 win over Reyer Venezia. Archie helped Varese reach the 2019 FIBA Europe Cup Semifinals, where they eventually were eliminated by s.Oliver Würzburg.

On June 19, 2019, Archie signed with the French team Champagne Chalons-Reims Basket for the 2019–20 season. He re-signed with the team on June 2, 2020.

On April 23, 2021, Archie signed with the Ottawa Blackjacks in the Canadian Elite Basketball League.

On July 28, 2021, he has signed with Élan Béarnais Pau-Orthez for the French Pro A.

== Career statistics ==
Legend
GP	Games played	MPG	Minutes per game	FG%	Field goal percentage
3P%	3-point field goal percentage	FT%	Free throw percentage	RPG	Rebounds per game
APG	Assists per game	SPG	Steals per game	BPG	Blocks per game
PPG	Points per game	**Bold**	Career high		Led the league

=== Domestic Leagues ===
Year	Team	League	GP	MPG	FG%	3P%	FT%	RPG	APG	SPG	BPG	PPG
2010–11	(United States) Austin Toros	D-League	15	18.6	.392	.214	**.857**	3.2	1.0	.4	.3	5.4
2011–12	(Romania) Timișoara	Liga Națională	40	**36.3**	.455	.409	.771	**7.1**	1.9	**1.7**	1.0	13.5
2012–13	(Romania) Timișoara	Liga Națională	32	32.5	.489	.357	.717	5.0	**3.0**	1.0	**1.1**	13
2013–14	(Italy) Orlandina	Serie A2	**41**	33.3	.522	.364	.732	6.9	1.5	1.1	1.0	**15.4**
2014–15	(Italy) Orlandina	Serie A	26	32.5	.452	.381	.736	6.3	1.3	.8	.3	13.1
2015	(Belgium) Oostende	BLB Division 1	14	17.7	.567	.517	.731	3.2	.7	.9	.2	7.8
2015–16	(Belgium) Oostende	BLB Division 1	39	17.7	**.569**	**.537**	.653	3.1	.9	.7	.3	7.2
2016–17	(Italy) Orlandina	Serie A	27	31.1	.494	.421	.763	5.5	1.0	1.3	.9	13.7
2017–18	(Israel) Herzliya	IPL	33	25.8	.442	.355	.632	4.4	1.5	.8	.8	8.5
2018–19	(Italy) Varese	Serie A	28	26.6	.428	.338	.723	4.6	1.5	1.0	.5	11.2

Source: RealGM
