= Dyshawn Pierre =

Canadian basketball player (born 1993)

- Pierre with Galatasaray in 2026

No. 21 – Galatasaray
- Position: Power forward / small forward
- League: BSL; Champions League

Personal information
- Born: November 17, 1993 (age 32) Whitby, Ontario, Canada
- Listed height: 1.98 m (6 ft 6 in)
- Listed weight: 104 kg (229 lb)

Career information
- High school: Anderson CVI (Whitby, Ontario)
- College: Dayton (2012–2016)
- NBA draft: 2016: undrafted
- Playing career: 2016–present

Career history
- 2016–2017: Löwen Braunschweig
- 2017–2020: Dinamo Sassari
- 2020–2025: Fenerbahçe
- 2025–2026: UNICS Kazan
- 2026–present: Galatasaray

Career highlights
- EuroLeague champion (2025); All-FIBA Champions League Second Team (2020); FIBA Europe Cup champion (2019); 3× Turkish League champion (2022, 2024, 2025); Italian Supercup winner (2019); Second-team All-Atlantic 10 (2015)
Medals
Men's 3x3 basketball
Representing Canada
FIBA Under-18 World Cup Dunk Contest
| Gold medal – first place | 2011 Italy | Team |
Men's basketball
Representing Canada
FIBA Under-17 World Cup
| Bronze medal – third place | 2010 Germany | Team |

Dyshawn Dylan Pierre (born November 17, 1993) is a Canadian professional basketball player for Galatasaray of the Basketbol Süper Ligi (BSL). He is from Whitby, Ontario and played college basketball for the Dayton Flyers. Standing at 6 ft 6 in (1.98 m), he plays at the power forward and small forward positions.

== Early life ==
Pierre was born in Whitby, Ontario. In high school, Pierre led the Anderson Raiders to back-to-back OFSAA championships in 2011 and 2012.

== College career ==
He averaged 13 points and 8 rebounds in his second season as a 6'6' shooting guard for the Dayton Flyers. In the 2014 NCAA Men's Division 1 basketball tournament, Pierre's free throw shooting in the final minute of the opening game helped the Flyers (11 seed) upset Ohio State University (6 seed). Pierre also hit three of four free throws in the final minutes of the second-round game against the Syracuse Orangemen (a 3 seed) to put the Flyers in the sweet sixteen. Dayton went on to beat Stanford, but lost to the Florida Gators in the elite eight, where Pierre scored 18 points.

Dyshawn Pierre was chosen as an All-Atlantic 10 Conference Second Team Selection. As a junior playing as a starter in the guard position, Pierre appeared in the "First Four" game held at The University of Dayton Arena that opened the 2015 NCAA Men's Division 1 basketball tournament. He scored nine points in a close come-back win for the Dayton Flyers against the Boise State Broncos to earn a place in the 64 team tournament. Comically, he found his shorts around his ankles after retrieving one of his six rebounds in the middle of the second half. In the second game of the tournament, Pierre scored 20 points, leading the Flyers over the sixth-seeded Providence Friars for an upset win, 66–53. Notably, Pierre spun inside with two minutes to play, put the ball in the hoop, and sank the "and one" foul shot.

Pierre was accused of sexual assault which was alleged to have occurred on April 23, 2015, and was reported to the University of Dayton in May. Pierre denied the allegations, stating that the sex was consensual. The Montgomery County, Ohio prosecutor's office declined to press charges against the basketball player, citing insufficient evidence. Nonetheless, the University of Dayton suspended Pierre for the fall semester, meaning he would be eligible to play basketball on December 22. He hired a lawyer to fight the suspension.

== Professional career ==
Coming out of college, Pierre made the summer league roster of the Indiana Pacers.

=== Löwen Braunschweig (2016–2017) ===
In late August 2016, he signed his first overseas contract with Basketball Löwen Braunschweig of the German Basketball Bundesliga. Grabbing 7.9 boards a contest, he led the German league in rebounding in the 2016–17 season and also averaged 14.9 points per outing.

=== Dinamo Sassari (2017–2020) ===
Pierre signed with Italian side Dinamo Basket Sassari for the 2017-18 campaign.

On 1 May 2019, he helped Dinamo Sassari with 19 points, 7 rebounds and 1 assist in final's second match to won its first European title after beating s.Oliver Würzburg in the 2019 FIBA Europe Cup Finals.

=== Fenerbahçe (2020–2025) ===
On July 8, 2020, Pierre signed with EuroLeague side Fenerbahçe Beko of the Turkish Basketball Super League (BSL). Pierre averaged 9.1 points and 3.3 rebounds per game. He signed a new three-year contract with the club on June 14, 2021. On May 30, 2023, Pierre renewed his contract through 2026.

On May 25, 2025, he helped Fenerbahçe to their second EuroLeague championship in Abu Dhabi. On July 7, 2025, Pierre parted ways with the Turkish powerhouse after five seasons and six titles in total.

=== UNICS (2025–2026) ===
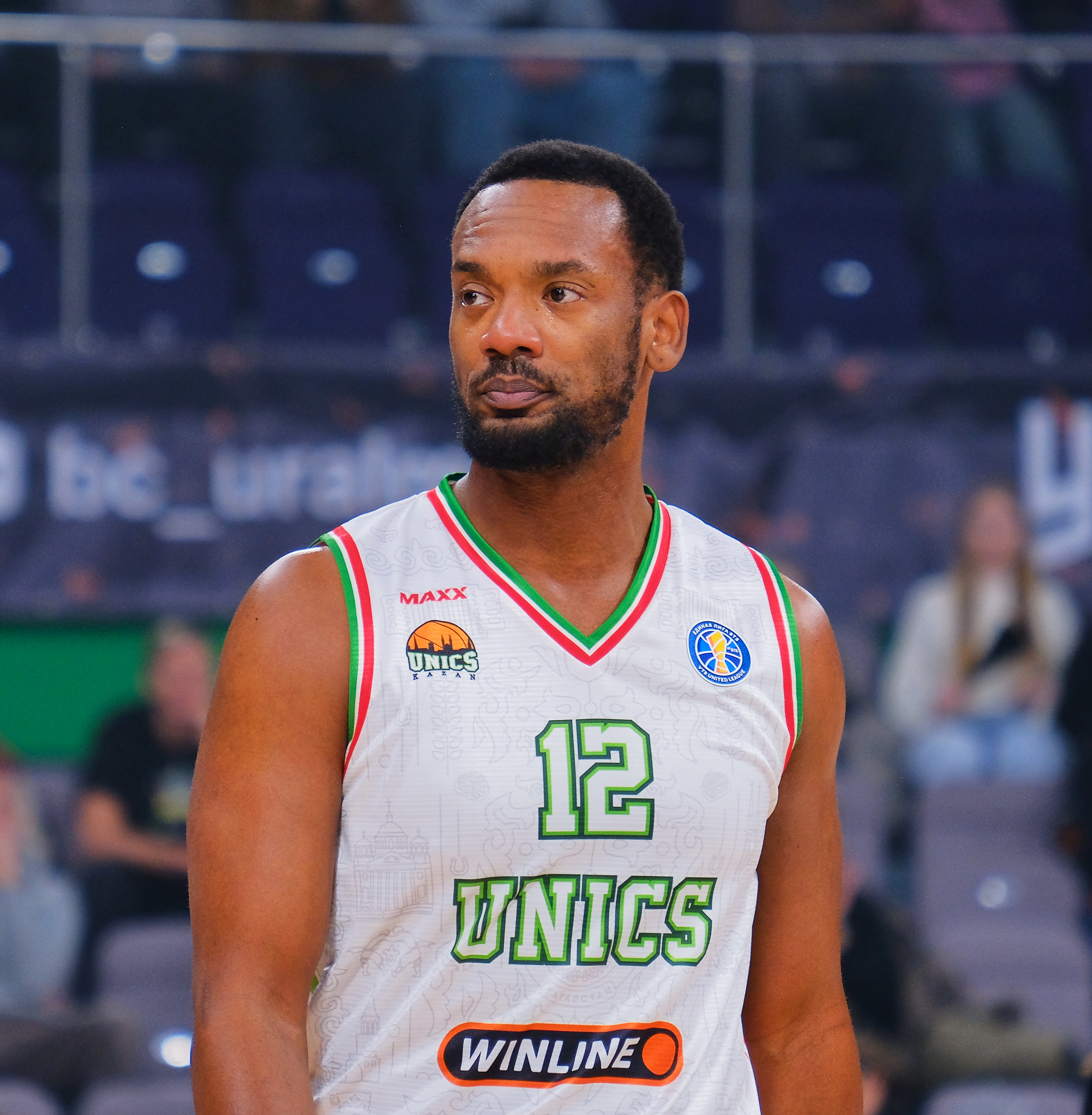
Pierre with UNICS Kazan in 2025

On August 21, 2025, he signed with UNICS of the VTB United League.

=== Galatasaray (2026–present) ===
Pierre with Galatasaray in 2026

On July 3, 2026, he signed with Galatasaray MCT Technic of the Turkish Basketbol Süper Ligi (BSL).

== The Basketball Tournament (TBT) (2017–present) ==
In the summer of 2017, Pierre played in The Basketball Tournament on ESPN for the Broad Street Brawlers. He competed for the $2 million prize, and for the Brawlers, he averaged 20.5 points per game along with shooting 52 percent behind the free-throw line. Pierre helped the Brawlers reach the second round of the tournament, only then losing to Team Colorado 111–95.

== National team career ==
Pierre has played with Canada Basketball on the Cadet team (2010) and Junior team (2011), winning bronze with teammates like Andrew Wiggins, Kevin Pangos, Anthony Bennett and Olivier Hanlan.

== Career statistics ==
Legend
| GP | Games played | GS | Games started | MPG | Minutes per game |
| FG% | Field-goal percentage | 3P% | 3-point field-goal percentage | FT% | Free-throw percentage |
| RPG | Rebounds per game | APG | Assists per game | SPG | Steals per game |
| BPG | Blocks per game | PPG | Points per game | PIR | Performance index rating |
| **Bold** | Career high | † | Won a EuroLeague championship |

=== EuroLeague ===
| Year | Team | GP | GS | MPG | FG% | 3P% | FT% | RPG | APG | SPG | BPG | PPG | PIR |
|---|---|---|---|---|---|---|---|---|---|---|---|---|---|
| 2020–21 | Fenerbahçe | **36** | 6 | 24.2 | **.547** | .417 | .880 | 3.3 | **2.0** | .5 | **.4** | **9.1** | **11.9** |
| 2021–22 | Fenerbahçe | 28 | **26** | **27.8** | .471 | .313 | .829 | **4.4** | **2.0** | **1.0** | **.4** | 8.3 | 11.4 |
| 2022–23 | Fenerbahçe | 29 | 22 | 22.8 | .482 | **.486** | .586 | 3.8 | 1.6 | .3 | .2 | 7.2 | 9.3 |
| 2023–24 | Fenerbahçe | 27 | 24 | 19.8 | .441 | .302 | .917 | 3.9 | 1.0 | .6 | .1 | 5.6 | 8.0 |
| 2024–25† | Fenerbahçe | 25 | 1 | 11.3 | .500 | .367 | **.941** | 2.0 | .8 | .3 | .2 | 3.3 | 4.8 |
| Career | | 145 | 79 | 21.4 | .550 | .384 | .833 | 3.5 | 1.5 | .5 | .2 | 6.9 | 9.3 |

=== Basketball Champions League ===
| Year | Team | GP | GS | MPG | FG% | 3P% | FT% | RPG | APG | SPG | BPG | PPG |
|---|---|---|---|---|---|---|---|---|---|---|---|---|
| 2017–18 | Dinamo Sassari | 14 | 9 | 27.4 | **.603** | .297 | **.735** | 5.7 | **2.4** | .6 | **.6** | '12.6 |
| 2019–20 | Dinamo Sassari | **16** | **16** | **31.3** | .430 | **.329** | .721 | **8.4** | **2.4** | **.9** | .4 | **12.6** |
| Career | | 30 | 25 | 29.5 | .500 | .318 | .727 | 7.2 | 2.4 | .8 | .5 | 12.6 |

=== FIBA Europe Cup ===
| † | Denotes seasons in which Pierre won the EuroCup |

| Year | Team | GP | GS | MPG | FG% | 3P% | FT% | RPG | APG | SPG | BPG | PPG |
|---|---|---|---|---|---|---|---|---|---|---|---|---|
| 2017–18 | Dinamo Sassari | 2 | 2 | **23.9** | **.500** | **.333** | **1.000** | **5.5** | .5 | — | **1.0** | **8.5** |
| 2018–19† | Dinamo Sassari | **18** | **12** | 20.7 | .427 | .323 | .714 | 4.3 | **2.2** | **.7** | .1 | 7.4 |
| Career | | 20 | 14 | 21.0 | .434 | .324 | .739 | 4.5 | 2.1 | .7 | .2 | 7.6 |

=== Domestic leagues ===
| † | Denotes seasons in which Pierre won the domestic league |

| Year | Team | League | GP | MPG | FG% | 3P% | FT% | RPG | APG | SPG | BPG | PPG |
|---|---|---|---|---|---|---|---|---|---|---|---|---|
| 2016–17 | (Germany) Löwen Braunschweig | BBL | 32 | 32.9 | .490 | .311 | .807 | 7.9 | 2.8 | 1.1 | .2 | 14.9 |
| 2017–18 | (Italy) Dinamo Sassari | LBA | 29 | 23.0 | .516 | .370 | .800 | 4.1 | 1.1 | .5 | .3 | 7.9 |
| 2018–19 | (Italy) Dinamo Sassari | LBA | 39 | 24.4 | .530 | .468 | .768 | 5.1 | 1.8 | .7 | .1 | 10.1 |
| 2019–20 | (Italy) Dinamo Sassari | LBA | 21 | 30.8 | .515 | .450 | .761 | 6.9 | 2.8 | 1.1 | .4 | 13.8 |
| 2020–21 | (Turkey) Fenerbahçe | TBSL | 26 | 25.3 | .583 | .453 | .754 | 3.7 | 3.0 | .6 | .2 | 9.5 |
| 2021–22† | (Turkey) Fenerbahçe | TBSL | 23 | 24.1 | .514 | .314 | .725 | 5.2 | 2.4 | .7 | .3 | 8.5 |
| 2022–23 | (Turkey) Fenerbahçe | TBSL | 24 | 25.2 | .475 | .382 | .788 | 4.9 | 2.4 | .7 | .2 | 8.4 |
| 2023–24† | (Turkey) Fenerbahçe | TBSL | 15 | 19.9 | .541 | .385 | .852 | 3.2 | 1.4 | .4 | .3 | 7.5 |

=== College ===
| Year | Team | GP | GS | MPG | FG% | 3P% | FT% | RPG | APG | SPG | BPG | PPG |
|---|---|---|---|---|---|---|---|---|---|---|---|---|
| 2012–13 | Dayton | 31 | 28 | 27.3 | **.567** | **.462** | .671 | 5.1 | 2.0 | .4 | .2 | 8.8 |
| 2013–14 | Dayton | **37** | **36** | 26.9 | .519 | .409 | .676 | 5.5 | 1.6 | .5 | **.4** | 11.2 |
| 2014–15 | Dayton | 36 | 35 | **33.4** | .508 | .356 | .676 | 8.1 | **2.9** | **.6** | **.4** | **12.7** |
| 2015–16 | Dayton | 22 | 20 | 33.2 | .500 | .347 | **.846** | **8.5** | 2.3 | **.6** | .2 | 12.6 |
| Career | | 126 | 119 | 29.9 | .520 | .384 | .706 | 6.7 | 2.2 | .5 | .3 | 11.3 |
