= Cameron Wells =

American basketball player (born 1988)

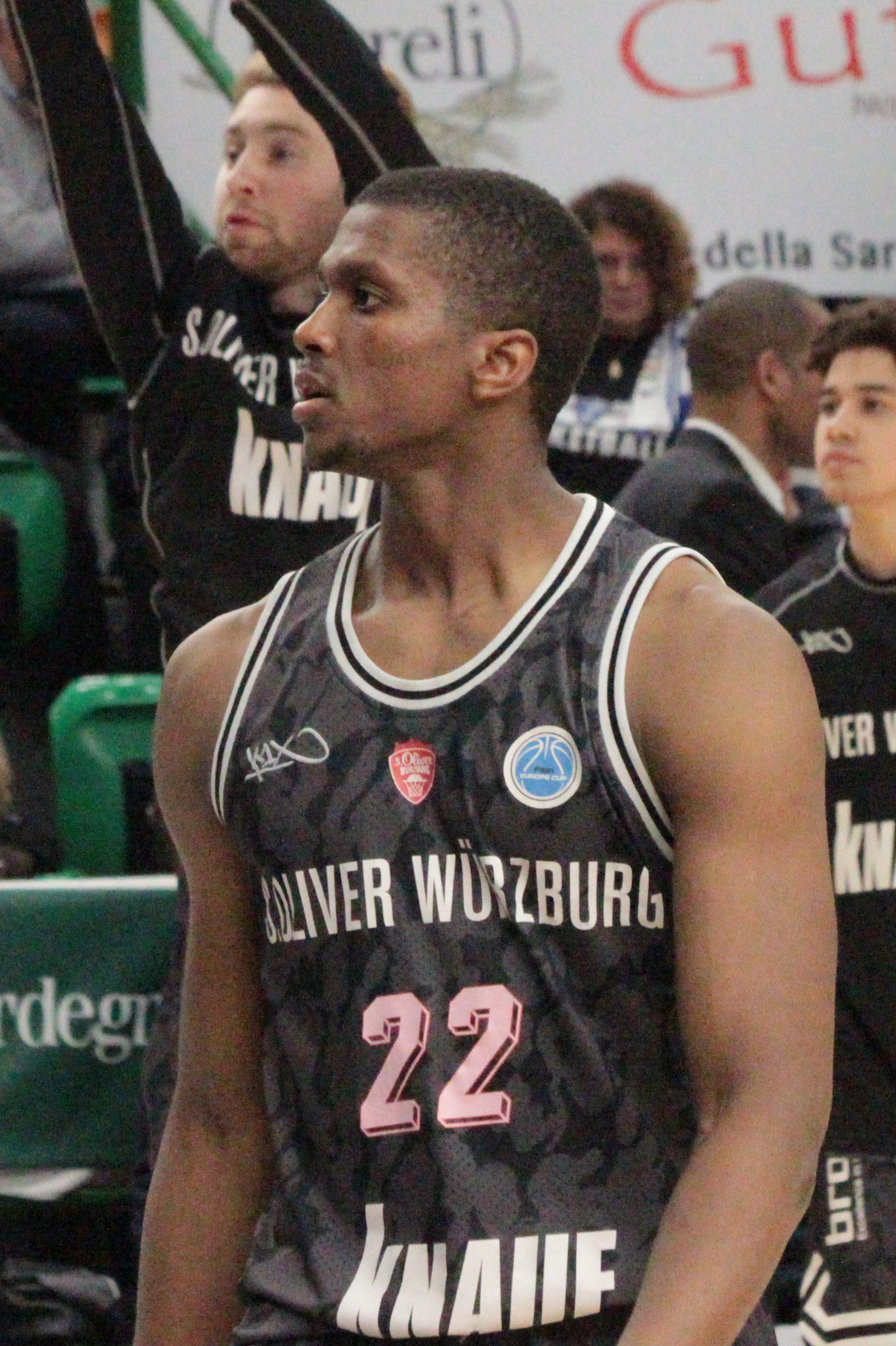
- Wells with Würzburg in the 2019 FIBA Europe Cup Finals

The Citadel Bulldogs
- Position: Assistant coach
- League: Southern Conference

Personal information
- Born: September 23, 1988 (age 38) Houston, Texas, U.S.
- Listed height: 6 ft 1 in (1.85 m)
- Listed weight: 207 lb (94 kg)

Career information
- High school: Bellaire (Bellaire, Texas)
- College: The Citadel (2007–2011)
- NBA draft: 2011: undrafted
- Playing career: 2011–2023
- Coaching career: 2023–present

Career history

Playing
- 2011–2012: Landstede Zwolle
- 2012–2013: Tigers Tübingen
- 2014–2017: Gießen 46ers
- 2017–2018: Varese
- 2018–2020: S.Oliver Würzburg
- 2020: BCM Gravelines-Dunkerque
- 2020–2021: Boulazac Basket Dordogne
- 2021–2022: Medi Bayreuth
- 2023–2023: Trefl Sopot

Coaching
- 2023-present: The Citadel (assistant)

Career highlights
- As player: Polish Cup winner (2023); BBL All-Star (2017); ProA champion (2015); DBL All-Star (2012)

Cameron Louis Wells (born September 23, 1988) is an American basketball coach and former player who is currently an assistant coach at his alma mater, The Citadel.

== Professional career ==
=== Zwolle ===
In August 2011, Wells signed a one-year contract with Landstede Zwolle of the Dutch Basketball League (DBL). In February 2012, he was selected for Team North of the DBL All-Star Game.

=== Tübingen ===
In his second professional season, Wells played with Tigers Tübingen. In the summer of 2013, Wells injured his knee which forced him to sit out the 2013–14 season.

=== Gießen ===
In June 2014, Wells signed with the Gießen 46ers of the German second tier ProA. Gießen won the ProA championship and promoted to the Basketball Bundesliga (BBL) in Well's first season.

Wells extended his contract with Gießen for two more years. In the 2016–17 season, he was named captain of the 46ers. Wells was also selected for the BBL All-Star Game, playing in Team International. In June 2017, he was handed a three-month ban for a failed doping test. According to the anti-doping-commission of the German basketball federation, Wells had probably consumed a contaminated dietary supplement.

=== Varese ===
On July 11, 2017, Wells was announced by Pallacanestro Varese of the Italian Lega Basket Serie A (LBA).

=== Würzburg ===
In the 2018 offseason, Wells signed with S.Oliver Würzburg of the German Bundesliga. With Würzburg, Wells reached the 2019 FIBA Europe Cup Finals where he lost to Dinamo Sassari. Wells served as the Würzburg team captain in 2019–20 and averaged 16.2 points as wells as 5.5 assists per contest in Bundesliga play.

=== Gravelines ===
Wells was signed by French ProA side BCM Gravelines-Dunkerque in June 2020.

=== Boulazac ===
On December 17, 2020, he has signed with Boulazac Basket Dordogne of the French LNB Pro A. Wells averaged 9.3 points and 4 assists per game.

=== Bayreuth ===
On June 19, 2021, Wells signed with Medi Bayreuth of the Basketball Bundesliga.

=== Trefl Sopot ===
On September 20, 2022, he signed with Trefl Sopot of the Polish Basketball League.

== Coaching career ==
Following the conclusion of his playing career in 2023, Wells returned to The Citadel as an assistant coach.

== Honors ==
Landstede Zwolle

- DBL All-Star: 2012

Gießen 46ers

- ProA: 2014–15
- BBL All-Star: 2017

Trefl Sopot

- Polish Cup: 2023
