= Lukas Herzog (basketball) =

German basketball player (born 2001)

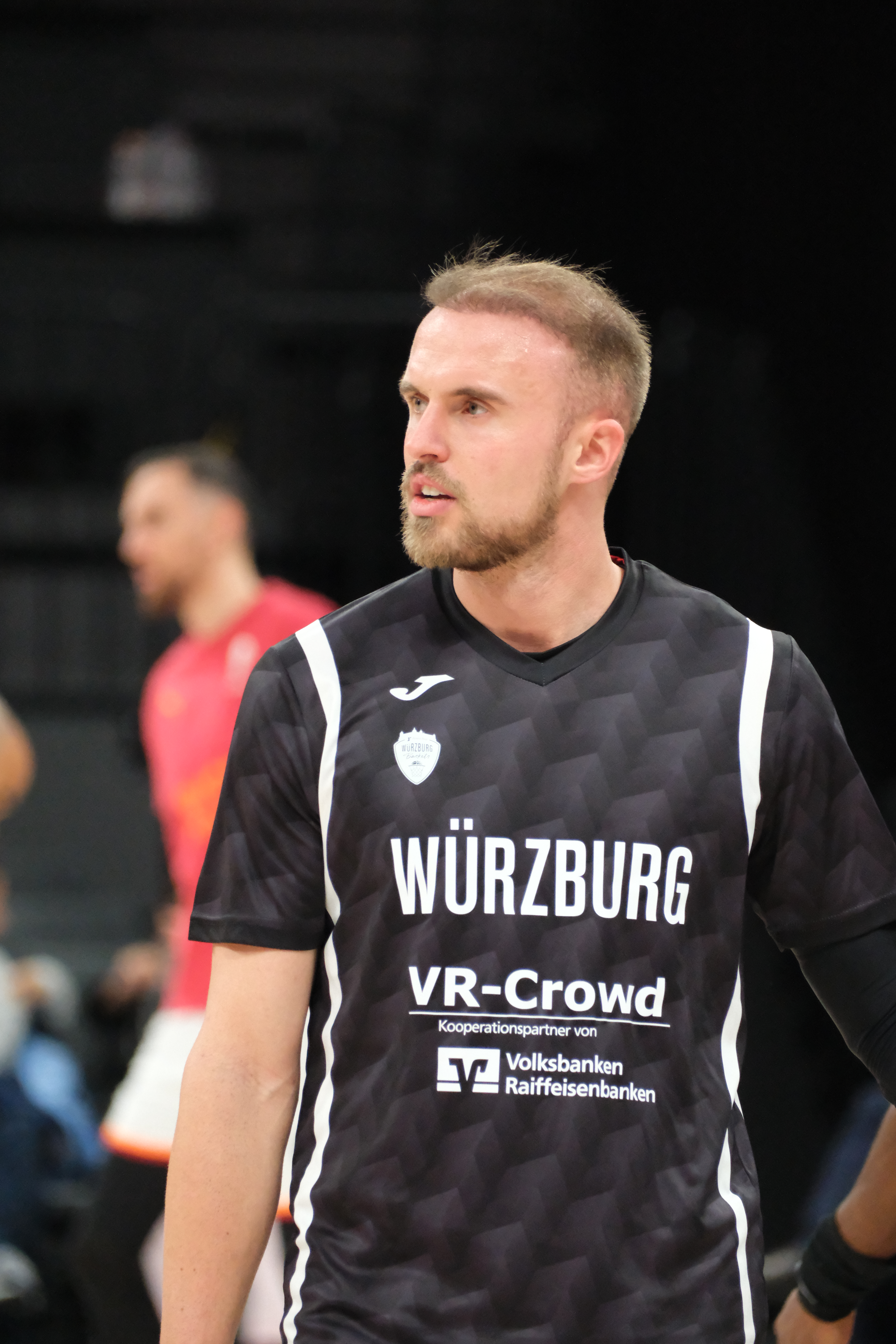
- Herzog with Würzburg Baskets in 2025

No. 1 – Würzburg Baskets
- Position: Point guard / shooting guard
- League: Basketball Bundesliga

Personal information
- Born: 10 September 2001 (age 25) Stuttgart, Germany
- Listed height: 1.86 m (6 ft 1 in)

Career information
- Playing career: 2014–present

Career history
- 2014–2022: Riesen Ludwigsburg
- 2022–2023: MLP Academics Heidelberg
- 2023–2024: Bamberg Baskets
- 2024–2025: PS Karlsruhe Lions
- 2025–present: Würzburg Baskets

Lukas Herzog (born 10 September 2001) is a German basketball player for Würzburg Baskets of the German Basketball Bundesliga (BBL).

== Early and personal life ==
Lukas Herzog was born on 10 September 2001 in Stuttgart. He grew up in Weilimdorf. Until he was 13, he played both basketball at BBC Stuttgart, but also soccer at SG Weilimdorf. Then he decided to skip soccer in favor of basketball. He still likes to watch soccer as he is friends with Luca Mack.

== Professional career ==
The 15-year-old Lukas Herzog came to Ludwigsburg for the 2014/15 season and, initially equipped with a double license for his home club BBC Stuttgart, led the BSG Ludwigsburg U14 to the Baden-Württemberg championship and among the best eight teams in the entire country.

In the summer of 2015, he and his twin brother Manuel moved completely to Stuttgart. Lukas immediately asserted himself as a top performer in his first season at the Porsche Basketball Academy, Ludwigsburg's JBBL (under-16 Bundesliga) team.

In his second season in the U16 Bundesliga, Herzog only played six games, as he was promoted to the Porsche BBA U19 team at an early stage. Against some three years older players, he quickly established himself as the third best scorer of his team and reached the play-off round of 16 with the Porsche BBA.

He gained experience in the men's area in the Baden-Württemberg Regionalliga in 2016/17. In addition to the successes on the basketball court, Herzog was also awarded the “Turbo2016” by main sponsor Porsche for the greatest social commitment.

On 7 January 2018 he received his first game minutes with the Riesen Ludwigsburg in the 2018–19 Basketball Bundesliga.

In the 2019/20 season, he served as team captain of the Porsche Basketball Academy's NBBL (under-19 Bundesliga) team.

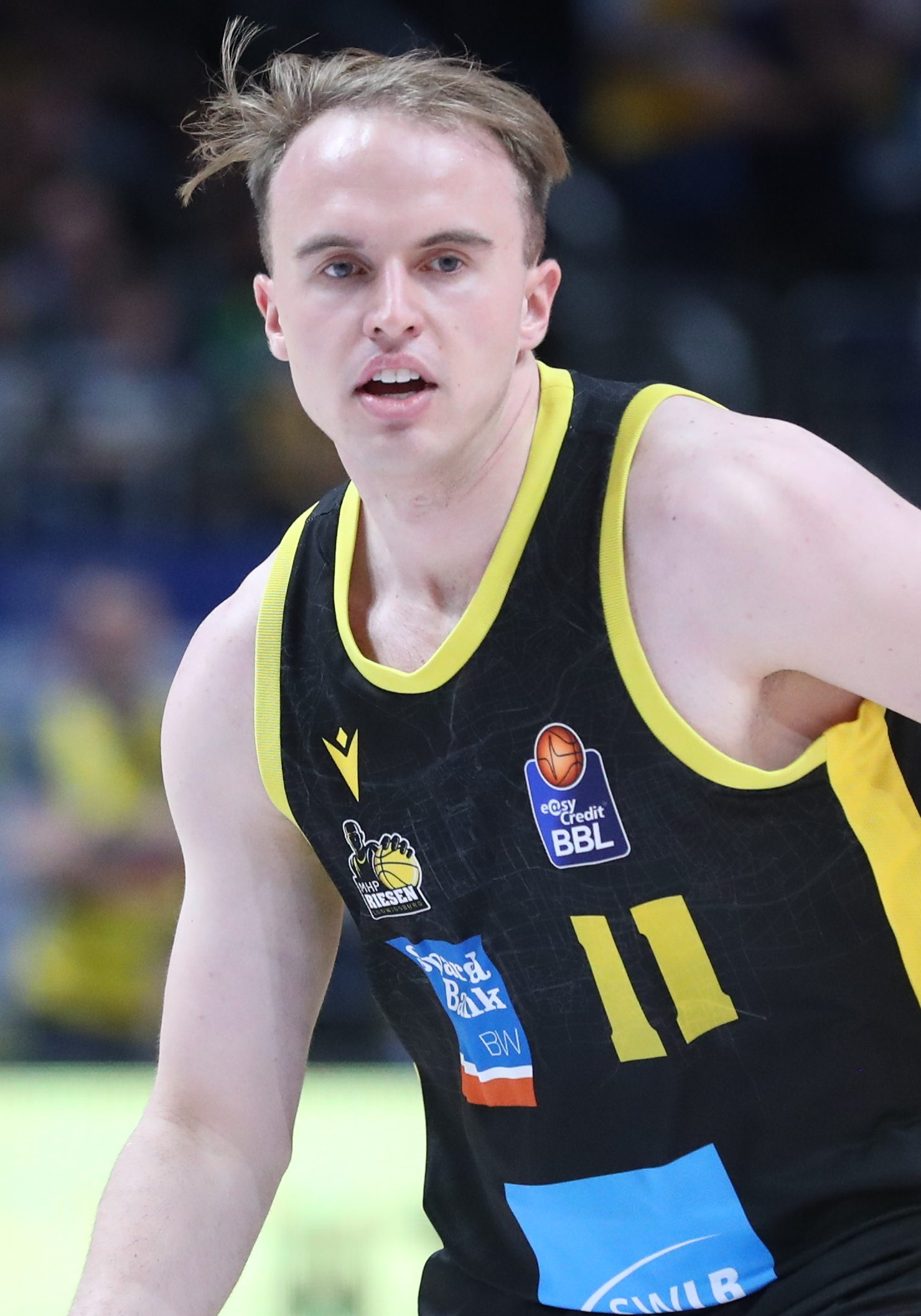
Herzog with Riesen Ludwigsburg in 2022

For the Riesen Ludwigsburg Herzog had his breakthrough performance in the Finals of the 2019–20 Basketball Bundesliga when under the guidance of head coach John Patrick, the Riesen became vice champion.

On June 14, 2022, Herzog signed with MLP Academics Heidelberg of the German Basketball Bundesliga.

On July 6, 2023, he signed with Bamberg Baskets of the Basketball Bundesliga (BBL).

On June 18, 2025, he signed with Würzburg Baskets of the German Basketball Bundesliga (BBL).

== National team ==
Lukas Herzog played for Germany's under-16 national team in mid-2017 where he joined former Porsche BBA teammate Ariel Hukporti.
