= Florian Koch =

German basketball player (born 1992)

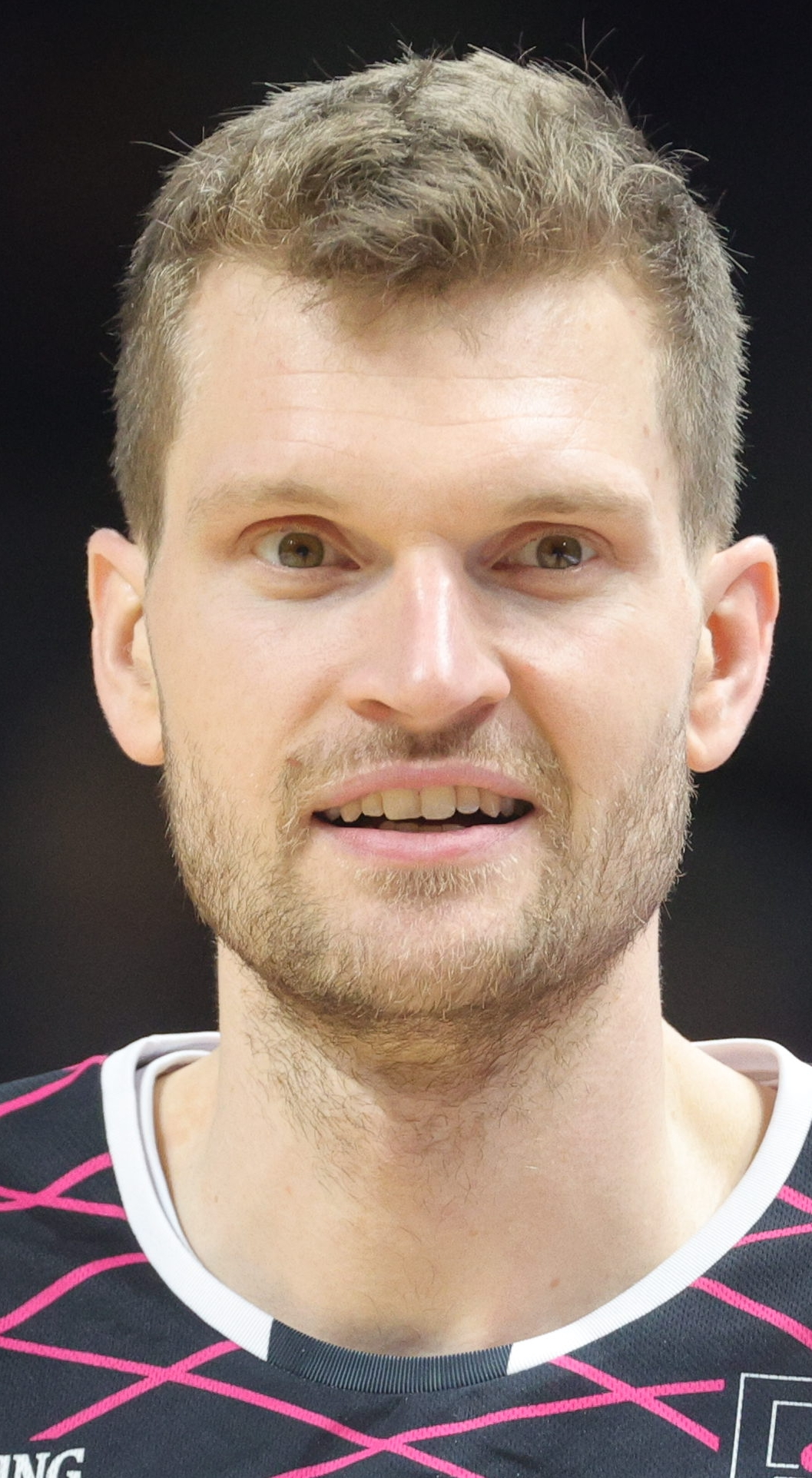
- Koch while playing for Bonn (2024)

No. 12 – Telekom Baskets Bonn
- Position: Small forward
- League: Basketball Bundesliga

Personal information
- Born: 26 March 1992 (age 34) Bonn, Germany
- Listed height: 6 ft 6 in (1.98 m)
- Listed weight: 190 lb (86 kg)

Career information
- Playing career: 2011–present

Career history
- 2011–2017: Telekom Baskets Bonn
- 2011–2013: →Dragons Rhöndorf
- 2017–2018: MHP Riesen Ludwigsburg
- 2018–2021: s.Oliver Würzburg
- 2021–2022: Gießen 46ers
- 2022–2023: Dragons Rhöndorf
- 2023–present: Telekom Baskets Bonn

Florian Koch (born 26 March 1992) is a German professional basketball player for Telekom Baskets Bonn of the Basketball Bundesliga. For the most part of his career, he played for the Baskets Bonn. On 10 June 2017 Koch left the team, but returned in 2023.

On 19 June 2017 Koch signed with MHP Riesen Ludwigsburg for the 2017–18 season. On 30 May 2018, he signed a two-year deal with s.Oliver Würzburg. On 28 July 2020, Koch re-signed with the team.

On June 2, 2021, he signed with Gießen 46ers of the Basketball Bundesliga.
