= Mike Morrison (basketball, born 1989) =

American basketball player

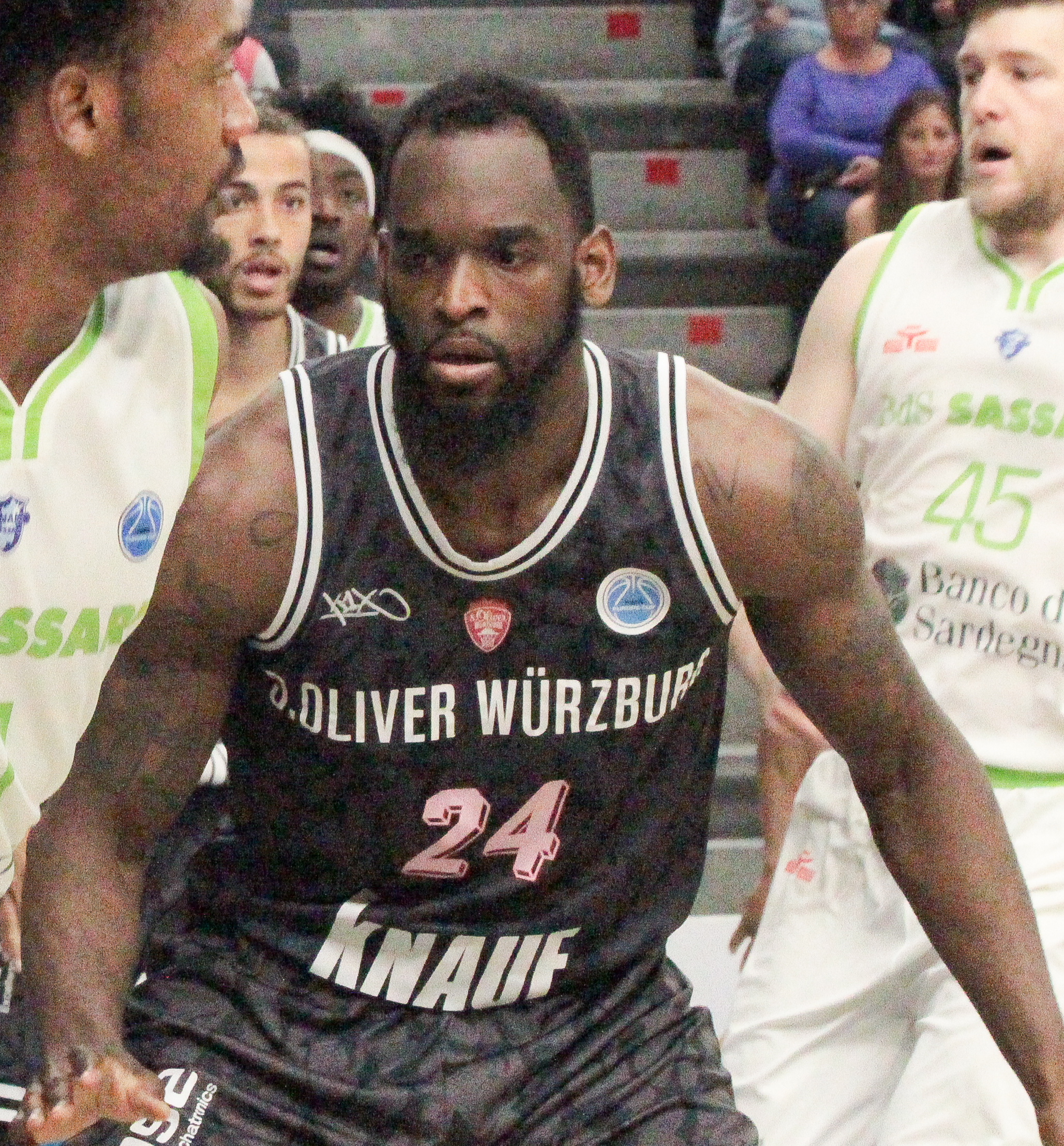
- Morrison with Würzburg in 2019

Keravnos
- Position: Power forward / center
- League: Cypriot League

Personal information
- Born: October 31, 1989 (age 37) St. Petersburg, Florida, U.S.
- Listed height: 6 ft 9 in (2.06 m)
- Listed weight: 238 lb (108 kg)

Career information
- High school: Lakewood (St. Petersburg, Florida)
- College: George Mason (2008–2012)
- NBA draft: 2012: undrafted
- Playing career: 2012–present

Career history
- 2012: Antwerp Giants
- 2012–2013: APOEL
- 2013–2014: Kataja
- 2014–2018: Skyliners Frankfurt
- 2018-2019: Lietkabelis
- 2018–2019: s.Oliver Würzburg
- 2019–2020: Peristeri
- 2019–2020: Mono Vampire
- 2020–2021: Semt77 Yalovaspor
- 2021–present: Keravnos

Career highlights
- FIBA Europe Cup champion (2016); Cypriot Super Cup winner (2021)

Michael Anthony Morrison (born 31 October 1989) is an American professional basketball player for Keravnos of the Cypriot League. He has also played professionally in Belgium, Cyprus, Finland, Lithuania, Germany and Greece.

== Career ==
Morrison started his career in 2012 with the Antwerp Giants.

In the summer of 2017, Morrison played in The Basketball Tournament on ESPN for The Stickmen. He competed for the $2 million prize, and for The Stickmen, he averaged 8.5 points per game. Morrison helped take The Stickmen to the second round of the tournament, where they then lost to Team Challenge ALS 87–73.

Morrison spent the 2017–18 season back with Skyliners Frankfurt in the Basketball Bundesliga. He averaged 8.4 points and 4.5 rebounds per game.

On August 11, 2018, he signed with BC Lietkabelis.

In November 2018, Morrison signed a six-week contract with S.Oliver Würzburg of the German Bundesliga. His contract was extended to the end of the season.

On August 2, 2019, Morrison signed with Peristeri of the Greek Basket League.

On August 23, 2020, Mike Morrison signed with Semt77 Yalovaspor of the Turkish Basketball First League.

== Personal ==
He has a step-brother named Zachary Morrison in the United States.
