= Felix Hoffmann (basketball) =

German basketball player (born 1989)

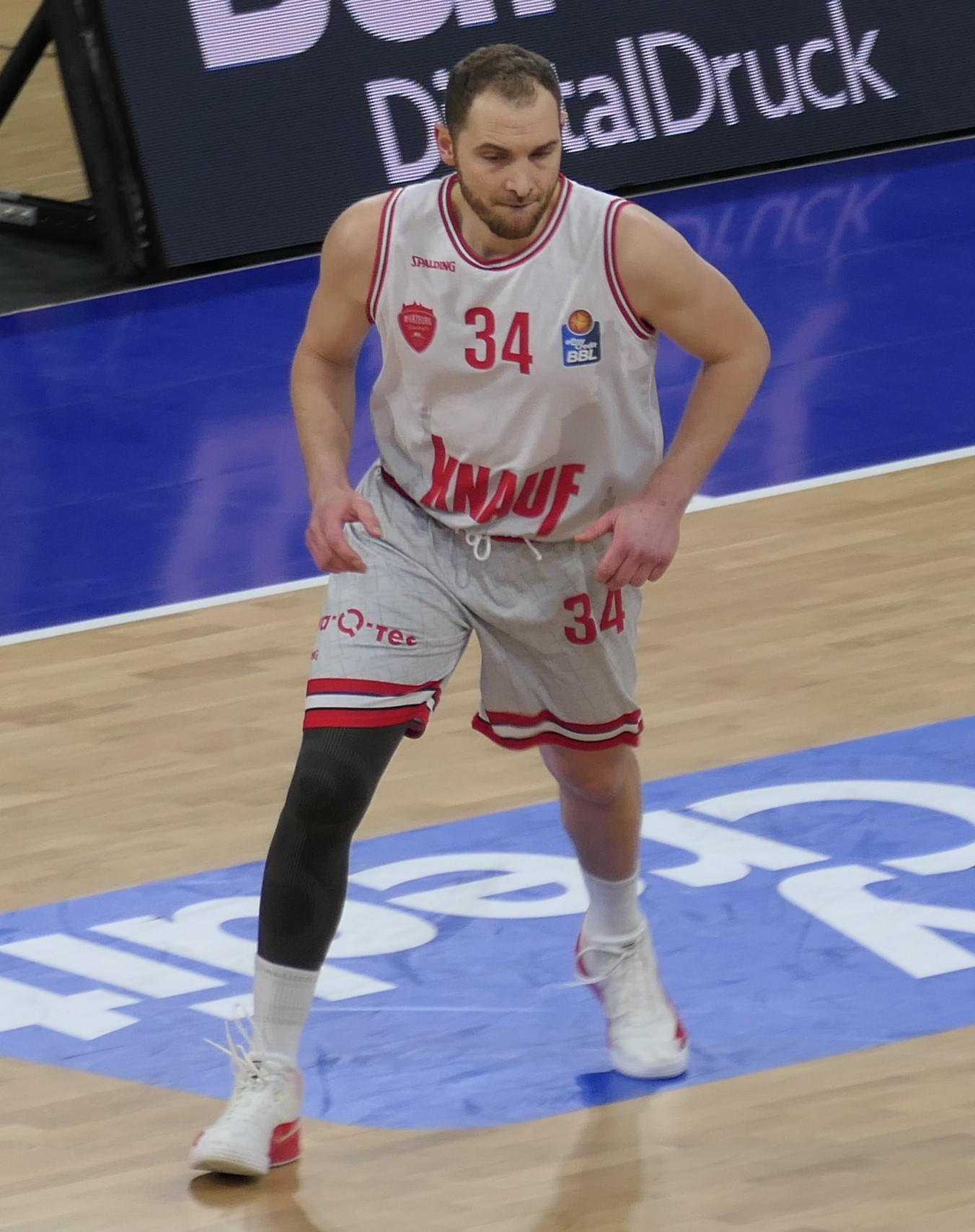
- Hoffmann with Würzburg Baskets in January 2023

No. 34 – Würzburg Baskets
- Position: Small forward
- League: Bundesliga

Personal information
- Born: 11 July 1989 (age 37) Würzburg, Germany
- Listed height: 6 ft 6 in (1.98 m)

Career information
- Playing career: 2007–present

Career history
- 2014–2015: Oettinger Rockets Gotha
- 2016–present: s.Oliver Würzburg

Felix Hoffmann (born 11 July 1989) is a German professional basketball player for s.Oliver Würzburg of the German League Basketball Bundesliga (BBL).

During the 2014-15 season, he played for the Oettinger Rockets Gotha.
