= 2018–19 FIBA Europe Cup =

- Season: 2018–19
- Dates: 20 September – 10 October 2018 (qualifying rounds); 17 October 2018 – 1 May 2019 (competition proper)
- Games played: 200
- Teams: 32 (regular season)

Finals
- Champions: (Italy) Dinamo Sassari (1st title)
- Runners-up: (Germany) s.Oliver Würzburg
- Semi-finalists: (Israel) Hapoel Holon (Italy) Varese

Statistical leaders
Points	(United States) Darius Thompson	22.4
Rebounds	(Egypt) Assem Marei	9.9
Assists	(United States) Maurice Watson Jr.	6.5
Index Rating	(United States) Darius Thompson	22.8

Records
- Biggest home win: s.Oliver Würzburg 118–71 Szolnoki Olaj (9 January 2019)
- Biggest away win: Istanbul BBSK 47–85 Donar Groningen (7 November 2018)
- Highest scoring: Bakken Bears 124–125 Avtodor Saratov (6 February 2019)

Seasons
- ← 2017–18 2019–20 →

The 2018–19 FIBA Europe Cup was the fourth season of the FIBA Europe Cup, a European professional basketball competition for clubs, that was launched by FIBA. The competition began on 20 September 2018, with the qualifying rounds, and concluded on 1 May 2019.

Dinamo Sassari won its first European title after beating s.Oliver Würzburg in the 2019 FIBA Europe Cup Finals.

== Team allocation ==
=== Teams ===
The labels in the parentheses show how each team qualified for the place of its starting round:

- 1st, 2nd, 3rd, etc.: League position after eventual Playoffs
- CL: Transferred from Champions League
  - RS: Fifth-placed and sixth-placed teams from regular season
  - QR: Losers from qualifying rounds

Play-offs
(Italy) ~~Sidigas Scandone~~ (CL RS)	(Israel) Hapoel Holon (CL RS)	(Lithuania) ~~Lietkabelis~~ (CL RS)	(France) ~~SIG Strasbourg~~ (CL RS)
(Latvia) Ventspils (CL RS)	(Germany) Telekom Baskets Bonn (CL RS)	(France) ~~JDA Dijon~~ (CL RS)	(Belgium) Filou Oostende (CL RS)
Regular season
(Belgium) Belfius Mons-Hainaut (5th)	(Finland) ~~Karhu~~ (CL QR3)	(Spain) ~~Movistar Estudiantes~~ (CL QR2)	(Lithuania) ~~Šiauliai~~ (CL QR1)
(Germany) s.Oliver Würzburg (9th)	(Poland) ~~Polski Cukier Toruń~~ (CL QR3)	(Belarus) Tsmoki-Minsk (CL QR1)	(Portugal) Porto (CL QR1)
(Hungary) Falco Vulcano (2nd)	(Turkey) Sakarya Büyükşehir (CL QR3)	(Cyprus) Petrolina AEK Larnaca (CL QR1)	(Romania) Oradea (CL QR1)
(Italy) Varese (6th)	(Bulgaria) Lukoil Levski (CL QR2)	(Georgia (country)) ~~Dinamo Tbilisi~~ (CL QR1)	(Russia) Avtodor (CL QR1)
(Romania) Steaua CSM EximBank (2nd)	(Denmark) Bakken Bears (CL QR2)	(United Kingdom) Leicester Riders (CL QR1)	(Sweden) ~~Norrköping Dolphins~~ (CL QR1)
(Turkey) Pınar Karşıyaka (10th)	(Greece) Aris (CL QR2)	(Hungary) Szolnoki Olaj (CL QR1)	
(Belgium) Spirou (CL QR3)	(Italy) ~~Cantù~~ (CL QR2)	(Israel) ~~Hapoel Tel Aviv~~ (CL QR1)	
(Czech Republic) JIP Pardubice (CL QR3)	(Netherlands) Donar (CL QR2)	(Kosovo) Z-Mobile Prishtina (CL QR1)	
Second qualifying round
(Bulgaria) Balkan (2nd)	(Netherlands) New Heroes Den Bosch (5th)	(Hungary) Alba Fehérvár (3rd)	(Romania) U-BT Cluj-Napoca (3rd)
(Bulgaria) Rilski Sportist (3rd)	(Austria) ece Bulls Kapfenberg (1st)	(Italy) Dinamo Sassari (10th)	(Sweden) Luleå (2nd)
(Netherlands) ZZ Leiden (2nd)	(Cyprus) Keravnos (2nd)	(Portugal) Benfica (3rd)	
First qualifying round
(Ukraine) Cherkaski Mavpy (1st)	(Finland) Kataja (6th)	(Norway) Kongsberg Miners (1st)	(Turkey) İstanbul BB (11th)
(Ukraine) Dnipro (2nd)	(Greece) Lavrio Megabolt (6th	(Poland) Rosa Radom (5th)	
(Czech Republic) Dekstone Tuři Svitavy (4th)	(Israel) Ironi Nes Ziona (8th)	(Sweden) Södertälje Kings (3rd)	

== Round and draw dates ==
The draw will take place on the 31 July 2018 in the FIBA headquarters in Munich, Germany. The schedule of the competition is as follows (all draws are held at the FIBA headquarters in Munich, Germany, unless stated otherwise):

Phase	Round	Draw date	First leg	Second leg
Qualifying rounds	First qualifying round	31 July 2018	20–21 September 2018	26 September 2018
Qualifying rounds	Second qualifying round	31 July 2018	3 October 2018	9–10 October 2018
Regular season	Matchday 1	31 July 2018	17 October 2018	
Regular season	Matchday 2	31 July 2018	23–24 October 2018	
Regular season	Matchday 3	31 July 2018	30–31 October 2018	
Regular season	Matchday 4	31 July 2018	6–7 November 2018	
Regular season	Matchday 5	31 July 2018	13–14 November 2018	
Regular season	Matchday 6	31 July 2018	20–21 November 2018	
Second round	Matchday 1	31 July 2018	12 December 2018	
Second round	Matchday 2	31 July 2018	19 December 2018	
Second round	Matchday 3	31 July 2018	9 January 2019	
Second round	Matchday 4	31 July 2018	22–23 January 2019	
Second round	Matchday 5	31 July 2018	29–30 January 2019	
Second round	Matchday 6	31 July 2018	5–6 February 2019	
Play-offs	Round of 16	7 February 2019	5–6 March 2019	12–13 March 2019
Play-offs	Quarter-finals	7 February 2019	20 March 2019	27 March 2019
Play-offs	Semi-finals	7 February 2019	10 April 2019	17 April 2019
Play-offs	Finals	7 February 2019	24 April 2019	1 May 2019

== Qualifying rounds ==
The draw for the qualifying rounds was held on 31 July 2018 at the FIBA headquarters in Munich, Germany.

In the qualifying rounds, teams are divided into seeded and unseeded teams based on their club coefficients, and then drawn into two-legged home-and-away ties. Teams from the same country cannot be drawn against each other.

=== First qualifying round ===
A total of 10 teams played in the first qualifying round. The first legs were played on 20 and 21 September, and the second legs were played on 26 September 2018.

Team 1	Agg.	Team 2	1st leg	2nd leg
Lavrio Megabolt (Greece)	140–149	(Ukraine) Dnipro	82–73	58–76
Kongsberg Miners (Norway)	153–184	(Ukraine) Cherkaski Mavpy	63–83	90–101
Ironi Nes Ziona (Israel)	172–143	(Sweden) Södertälje Kings	72–67	100–76
Kataja (Finland)	161–134	(Poland) Rosa Radom	86–65	75–69
Dekstone Tuři Svitavy (Czech Republic)	152–197	(Turkey) İstanbul BB	74–99	78–98

=== Second qualifying round ===
A total of 16 teams will play in the second qualifying round: 11 teams which enter in this round, and the 5 winners of the first qualifying round. The first legs were played on 3 October, and the second legs will be played on 10 October 2018.

Team 1	Agg.	Team 2	1st leg	2nd leg
Cherkaski Mavpy (Ukraine)	136–128	(Cyprus) Keravnos	75–64	61–64
Dnipro (Ukraine)	161–168	(Hungary) Alba Fehérvár	94–78	67–90
ece Bulls Kapfenberg (Austria)	119–147	(Netherlands) ZZ Leiden	62–79	57–68
Kataja (Finland)	167–163	(Bulgaria) Rilski Sportist	106–84	61–79
New Heroes Den Bosch (Netherlands)	144–152	(Bulgaria) Balkan	76–86	68–66
Ironi Nes Ziona (Israel)	179–167	(Romania) U-BT Cluj-Napoca	91–78	88–89
İstanbul BB (Turkey)	160–128	(Sweden) Luleå	87–50	73–78
Dinamo Sassari (Italy)	211–158	(Portugal) Benfica	100–66	111–92

Notes

1. Order of legs reversed after original draw.

=== Lucky losers table ===
Three teams would advance as lucky losers of the qualifying rounds, for replacing teams that qualified for the Basketball Champions League regular season and previously confirmed their intention to join the FIBA Europe Cup if they were eliminated in the qualifying rounds. Teams with the smallest point difference in the second qualifying round advanced to the regular season. A draw to determine the groups for the clubs qualified as the best-ranked losing sides will be held in the FIBA Europe office in Munich on 11 October 2018.

Ranked third among the lucky losers, Den Bosch clipped the fourth-ranked Keravnos due to a higher number of points scored, with the teams tied in point differential.

Pos	Team	Pld	W	L	PF	PA	PD	Qualification
1	(Bulgaria) Rilski Sportist	2	1	1	163	167	−4	Advance to regular season
2	(Ukraine) Dnipro	2	1	1	161	168	−7	Advance to regular season
3	(Netherlands) New Heroes Den Bosch	2	1	1	144	152	−8	Advance to regular season
4	(Cyprus) Keravnos	2	1	1	128	136	−8	
5	(Romania) U-BT Cluj-Napoca	2	1	1	167	179	−12	
6	(Austria) ece Bulls Kapfenberg	2	0	2	119	147	−28	
7	(Sweden) Luleå	2	1	1	128	160	−32	
8	(Portugal) Benfica	2	0	2	158	211	−53	

Source: FIBA Europe Cup
Rules for classification: 1) Least point difference; 2) Points for.

== Regular season ==
Location of teams of the 2018–19 FIBA Europe Cup regular season.
Red: Group A; Yellow: Group B; Green: Group C; Dark Green: Group D; Purple: Group E. Pink: Group F; Blue: Group G; Orange: Group H.

The draw for the regular season was held on 31 July 2018 at the FIBA headquarters in Munich, Germany.

The 32 teams are drawn into eight groups of four, a maximum of two clubs from the same country can be in the same group. In each group, teams play against each other home-and-away in a round-robin format. The group winners and runners-up advance to the second round, while the third-placed teams and fourth-placed teams are eliminated.

The following 10 teams chose the option of ending their continental adventure if they were eliminated from the Champions League qualifying rounds and therefore refuse to participate in the FIBA Europe Cup:

Opt-out clause teams

- (Finland) ~~Karhu~~
- (France) Nanterre 92
- (Georgia (country)) ~~Dinamo Tbilisi~~
- (Israel) ~~Hapoel Tel Aviv~~
- (Italy) ~~Red October Cantù~~
- (Lithuania) ~~Šiauliai~~
- (Poland) ~~Polski Cukier Toruń~~
- (Spain) ~~Movistar Estudiantes~~
- (Spain) UCAM Murcia
- (Sweden) ~~Norrköping Dolphins~~
Notes:
- Strikethrough teams were eliminated from the Basketball Champions League qualifying rounds and refused to participate in the FIBA Europe Cup.
- Teams marked in italics advanced to the Basketball Champions League regular season.

A total of 32 teams play in the regular season: the six teams directly qualified, the eight winners of the second qualifying round, the 15 of 23 losers of the 2018–19 Champions League qualifying rounds and three lucky losers of the second qualifying round.

Depending on the number of teams mentioned above that were eliminated from the Basketball Champions League qualifying rounds and with the aim to complete the 32 places in the regular season, the number of the defeated teams in the second qualifying round of the FIBA Europe Cup that advanced to the regular season were determined by the point difference recorded at the end of their pairings. In their draw, the first qualifying round was used for tie-breaking. In the draw persists, the next criterion was the performance of clubs in the last three seasons at the European competitions.

The match-days are on 17 October, 24 October, 31 October, 7 November, 14 November and 21 November 2018.

Turkish side Sakarya Büyükşehir and British side Leicester Riders played in their first European campaigns ever.

=== Group A ===
Pos	Team	Pld	W	L	PF	PA	PD	Pts	Qualification	WÜR	LEI	SAK	ORA
1	(Germany) s.Oliver Würzburg	6	4	2	464	436	+28	10	Advance to second round	—	87–61	69–79	91–82
2	(Netherlands) ZZ Leiden	6	4	2	460	463	−3	10	Advance to second round	65–75	—	99–97	90–76
3	(Turkey) Sakarya Büyükşehir	6	3	3	480	451	+29	9		80–60	56–69	—	84–68
4	(Romania) Oradea	6	1	5	453	507	−54	7		69–82	72–76	86–84	—

Source: FIBA Europe Cup
Legend: Blue = home team win; Red = away team win.

=== Group B ===
Pos	Team	Pld	W	L	PF	PA	PD	Pts	Qualification	BAL	LAR	TSM	BEL
1	(Bulgaria) Balkan	6	4	2	480	452	+28	10	Advance to second round	—	77–78	95–81	78–66
2	(Cyprus) Petrolina AEK Larnaca	6	4	2	449	460	−11	10	Advance to second round	68–79	—	82–77	63–62
3	(Belarus) Tsmoki-Minsk	6	3	3	497	493	+4	9		84–73	87–75	—	89–82
4	(Belgium) Belfius Mons-Hainaut	6	1	5	449	470	−21	7		75–78	78–83	86–79	—

Source: FIBA Europe Cup
Legend: Blue = home team win; Red = away team win.

=== Group C ===
Pos	Team	Pld	W	L	PF	PA	PD	Pts	Qualification	DON	KAR	SPI	IBB
1	(Netherlands) Donar	6	5	1	473	440	+33	11	Advance to second round	—	89–83	76–73	90–81
2	(Turkey) Pınar Karşıyaka	6	4	2	490	437	+53	10	Advance to second round	64–69	—	90–72	86–75
3	(Belgium) Spirou	6	3	3	486	423	+63	9		92–64	77–86	—	92–45
4	(Turkey) İstanbul BB	6	0	6	365	514	−149	6		47–85	55–81	62–80	—

Source: FIBA Europe Cup
Legend: Blue = home team win; Red = away team win.

=== Group D ===
Pos	Team	Pld	W	L	PF	PA	PD	Pts	Qualification	AVT	INZ	BOS	PAR
1	(Russia) Avtodor	6	5	1	578	521	+57	11	Advance to second round	—	75–64	89–79	129–91
2	(Israel) Ironi Nes Ziona	6	4	2	561	509	+52	10	Advance to second round	104–86	—	91–85	111–77
3	(Netherlands) New Heroes Den Bosch	6	3	3	518	486	+32	9		93–97	102–87	—	91–58
4	(Czech Republic) JIP Pardubice	6	0	6	464	605	−141	6		90–102	84–104	64–68	—

Source: FIBA Europe Cup
Legend: Blue = home team win; Red = away team win.

=== Group E ===
Pos	Team	Pld	W	L	PF	PA	PD	Pts	Qualification	BAK	PRI	CHE	STE
1	(Denmark) Bakken Bears	6	6	0	633	454	+179	12	Advance to second round	—	108–84	121–89	100–64
2	(Kosovo) Z-Mobile Prishtina	6	4	2	506	513	−7	10	Advance to second round	77–100	—	92–82	74–69
3	(Ukraine) Cherkaski Mavpy	6	1	5	481	562	−81	7		77–106	73–92	—	90–64
4	(Romania) Steaua CSM EximBank	6	1	5	428	519	−91	7		63–98	81–87	87–70	—

Source: FIBA Europe Cup
Legend: Blue = home team win; Red = away team win.

=== Group F ===
Pos	Team	Pld	W	L	PF	PA	PD	Pts	Qualification	VAR	ALB	RIL	POR
1	(Italy) Varese	6	5	1	522	432	+90	11	Advance to second round	—	91–66	86–59	84–75
2	(Hungary) Alba Fehérvár	6	5	1	507	493	+14	11	Advance to second round	85–77	—	84–80	72–70
3	(Bulgaria) Rilski Sportist	6	1	5	470	536	−66	7		76–95	83–104	—	81–88
4	(Portugal) Porto	6	1	5	475	513	−38	7		71–89	92–96	79–91	—

Source: FIBA Europe Cup
Legend: Blue = home team win; Red = away team win.

=== Group G ===
Pos	Team	Pld	W	L	PF	PA	PD	Pts	Qualification	LEV	KAT	ARI	DNI
1	(Bulgaria) Levski Lukoil	6	5	1	520	465	+55	11	Advance to second round	—	94–86	77–66	83–65
2	(Finland) Kataja	6	3	3	497	510	−13	9	Advance to second round	95–102	—	88–86	84–77
3	(Greece) Aris	6	3	3	444	432	+12	9		81–76	70–79	—	86–61
4	(Ukraine) Dnipro	6	1	5	407	461	−54	7		72–88	81–65	51–55	—

Source: FIBA Europe Cup
Legend: Blue = home team win; Red = away team win.

=== Group H ===
Pos	Team	Pld	W	L	PF	PA	PD	Pts	Qualification	SZO	SAS	FAL	LEI
1	(Hungary) Szolnoki Olaj	6	5	1	509	474	+35	11	Advance to second round	—	87–74	79–76	82–79
2	(Italy) Dinamo Sassari	6	5	1	553	448	+105	11	Advance to second round	98–94	—	104–69	95–60
3	(Hungary) Falco Vulcano	6	2	4	446	507	−61	8		66–83	60–92	—	80–65
4	(United Kingdom) Leicester Riders	6	0	6	447	526	−79	6		81–84	78–90	84–95	—

Source: FIBA Europe Cup
Legend: Blue = home team win; Red = away team win.

== Second round ==
In each group, teams play against each other home-and-away in a round-robin format. The group winners and runners-up advance to the round of 16, while the third-placed teams and fourth-placed teams are eliminated.

A total of 16 teams play in the second round: the eight group winners and the eight runners-up of the regular season. The match-days will be on 12 December 2018, 19 December, 9 January, 23 January, 30 January and 6 February 2019.

=== Group I ===
Pos	Team	Pld	W	L	PF	PA	PD	Pts	Qualification	WÜR	KAR	PRI	SZO
1	(Germany) s.Oliver Würzburg	6	6	0	596	487	+109	12	Advance to round of 16	—	104–91	95–77	118–71
2	(Turkey) Pınar Karşıyaka	6	3	3	539	532	+7	9	Advance to round of 16	87–96	—	107–85	102–95
3	(Kosovo) Z-Mobile Prishtina	6	2	4	479	536	−57	8	Advance to round of 16	78–91	82–78	—	81–76
4	(Hungary) Szolnoki Olaj	6	1	5	484	543	−59	7		83–92	70–74	89–76	—

Source: FIBA Europe Cup
Legend: Blue = home team win; Red = away team win.

=== Group J ===
Pos	Team	Pld	W	L	PF	PA	PD	Pts	Qualification	INZ	BAL	ALB	LEV
1	(Israel) Ironi Nes Ziona	6	4	2	563	533	+30	10	Advance to round of 16	—	100–73	70–93	109–96
2	(Bulgaria) Balkan	6	3	3	496	499	−3	9	Advance to round of 16	102–90	—	88–82	81–57
3	(Hungary) Alba Fehérvár	6	3	3	489	458	+31	9	Advance to round of 16	80–96	65–64	—	89–56
4	(Bulgaria) Levski Lukoil	6	2	4	487	545	−58	8		89–98	105–88	84–80	—

Source: FIBA Europe Cup
Legend: Blue = home team win; Red = away team win.

=== Group K ===
Pos	Team	Pld	W	L	PF	PA	PD	Pts	Qualification	SAS	VAR	DON	LAR
1	(Italy) Dinamo Sassari	6	5	1	536	481	+55	11	Advance to round of 16	—	87–90	97–74	93–81
2	(Italy) Varese	6	4	2	492	446	+46	10	Advance to round of 16	69–79	—	77–80	109–74
3	(Netherlands) Donar	6	2	4	447	467	−20	8	Advance to round of 16	78–84	67–73	—	70–80
4	(Cyprus) Petrolina AEK Larnaca	6	1	5	439	520	−81	7		89–96	59–74	56–78	—

Source: FIBA Europe Cup
Legend: Blue = home team win; Red = away team win.

=== Group L ===
Pos	Team	Pld	W	L	PF	PA	PD	Pts	Qualification	AVT	BAK	LEI	KAT
1	(Russia) Avtodor	6	5	1	576	482	+94	11	Advance to round of 16	—	71–60	105–81	98–57
2	(Denmark) Bakken Bears	6	3	3	586	503	+83	9	Advance to round of 16	124–125	—	111–71	102–58
3	(Netherlands) ZZ Leiden	6	2	4	480	562	−82	8	Advance to round of 16	72–97	89–85	—	87–72
4	(Finland) Kataja	6	2	4	456	551	−95	8		88–80	89–104	92–80	—

Source: FIBA Europe Cup
Legend: Blue = home team win; Red = away team win.

== Play-offs ==
=== Bracket ===
Round of 16
(Israel) Hapoel Holon	85	82	167
(Bulgaria) Balkan	81	83	164
(Germany) Telekom Baskets	85	69	154
(Hungary) Alba Fehérvár	84	81	165
(Latvia) Ventspils	78	65	143
(Turkey) Pınar Karşıyaka	76	70	146
(Netherlands) ZZ Leiden	93	68	161
(Italy) Dinamo Sassari	97	94	191
(Netherlands) Donar	66	80	146
(Belgium) Filou Oostende	66	88	154
(Kosovo) Z-Mobile Prishtina	77	84	161
(Italy) Varese	80	100	180
(Denmark) Bakken Bears	91	81	172
(Israel) Ironi Nes Ziona	74	76	150
(Russia) Avtodor	76	90	166
(Germany) s.Oliver Würzburg	79	94	173

Quarter-finals
(Israel) Hapoel Holon	96	74	170
(Hungary) Alba Fehérvár	63	101	164
(Turkey) Pınar Karşıyaka	68	83	151
(Italy) Dinamo Sassari	87	83	170
(Belgium) Filou Oostende	70	57	127
(Italy) Varese	73	72	145
(Denmark) Bakken Bears	76	70	146
(Germany) s.Oliver Würzburg	75	86	161

Semi-finals
(Israel) Hapoel Holon	89	75	164
(Italy) Dinamo Sassari	94	105	199
(Italy) Varese	66	86	152
(Germany) s.Oliver Würzburg	89	89	178

Final
(Italy) Dinamo Sassari	89	81	170
(Germany) s.Oliver Würzburg	84	79	163

=== Round of 16 ===
The first legs were played on 5–6 March, and the second legs on 12–13 March 2019.

Team 1	Agg.	Team 2	1st leg	2nd leg
Donar (Netherlands)	146–154	(Belgium) Filou Oostende	66–66	80–88
Ventspils (Latvia)	143–146	(Turkey) Pınar Karşıyaka	78–76	65–70
Telekom Baskets Bonn (Germany)	154–165	(Hungary) Alba Fehérvár	85–84	69–81
Bakken Bears (Denmark)	172–150	(Israel) Ironi Nes Ziona	91–74	81–76
Avtodor (Russia)	166–173	(Germany) s.Oliver Würzburg	76–79	90–94
Hapoel Holon (Israel)	167–164	(Bulgaria) Balkan	85–81	82–83
ZZ Leiden (Netherlands)	161–191	(Italy) Dinamo Sassari	93–97	68–94
Z-Mobile Prishtina (Kosovo)	161–180	(Italy) Varese	77–80	84–100

=== Quarter-finals ===
The first legs were played on 20–21 March, and the second legs on 27–28 March 2019.

Team 1	Agg.	Team 2	1st leg	2nd leg
Filou Oostende (Belgium)	127–145	(Italy) Varese	70–73	57–72
Pınar Karşıyaka (Turkey)	151–170	(Italy) Dinamo Sassari	68–87	83–83
Hapoel Holon (Israel)	170–164	(Hungary) Alba Fehérvár	96–63	74–101
Bakken Bears (Denmark)	146–161	(Germany) s.Oliver Würzburg	76–75	70–86

=== Semi-finals ===
The first legs were played on 10 April, and the second legs were played on 17 April 2019.

Team 1	Agg.	Team 2	1st leg	2nd leg
Varese (Italy)	152–178	(Germany) s.Oliver Würzburg	66–89	86–89
Hapoel Holon (Israel)	164–199	(Italy) Dinamo Sassari	89–94	75–105

=== Finals ===
The first leg will be played on 24 April, and the second leg will be played on 1 May 2019.

Team 1	Agg.	Team 2	1st leg	2nd leg
Dinamo Sassari (Italy)	170–163	(Germany) s.Oliver Würzburg	89–84	81–79

== See also ==
- 2018–19 EuroLeague
- 2018–19 EuroCup Basketball
- 2018–19 Basketball Champions League
