= Jordan Hulls =

American basketball player

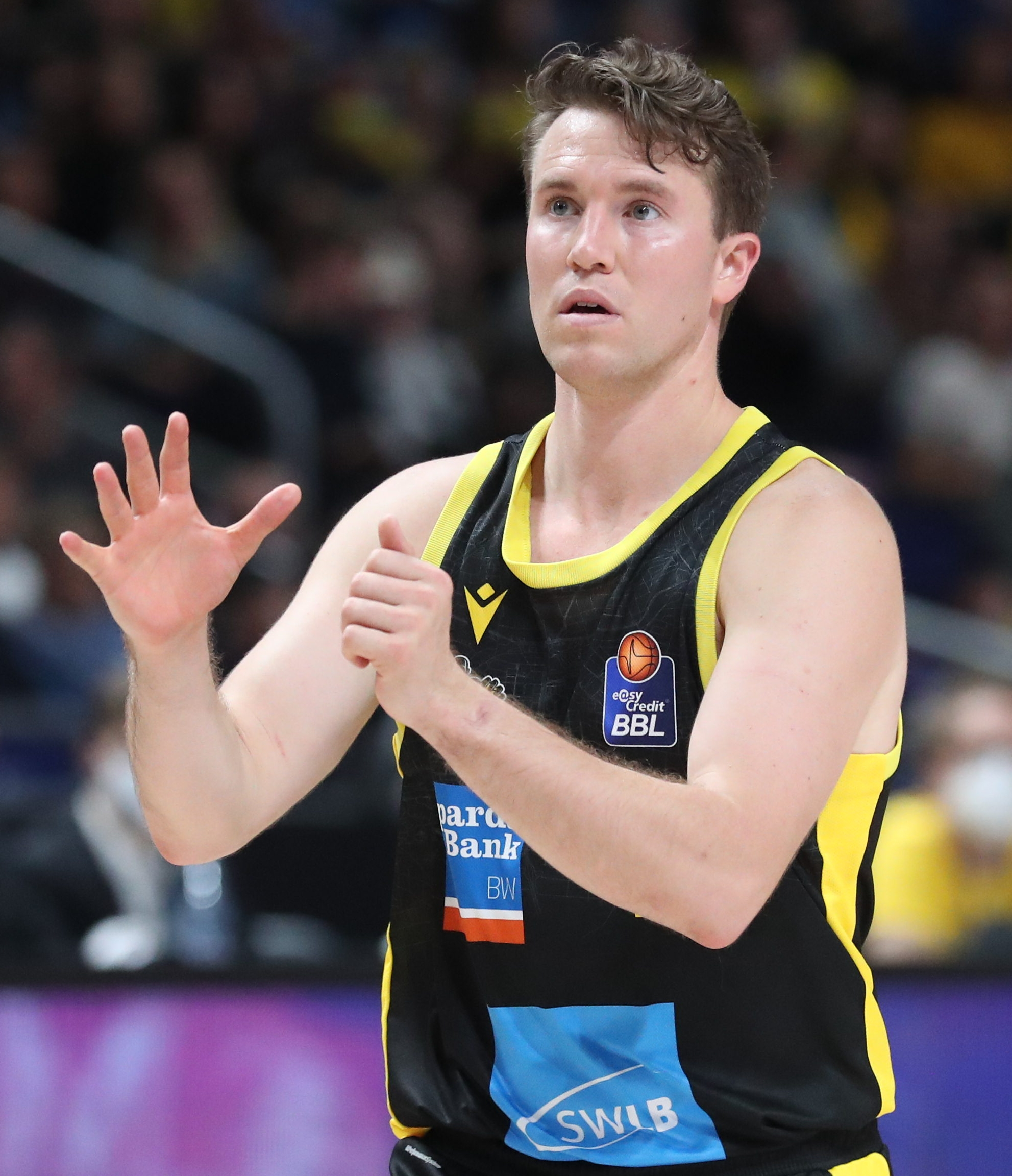
- Hulls in 2022

Indiana Hoosiers
- Title: Team and Recruiting Coordinator

Personal information
- Born: April 16, 1990 (age 36) Bloomington, Indiana, U.S.
- Listed height: 6 ft 0 in (1.83 m)
- Listed weight: 182 lb (83 kg)

Career information
- High school: Bloomington South (Bloomington, Indiana)
- College: Indiana (2009–2013)
- NBA draft: 2013: undrafted
- Playing career: 2013–2022
- Position: Point guard

Career history
- 2013–2014: Energa Czarni
- 2014–2015: Sigal Prishtina
- 2015–2016: Limburg United
- 2016–2018: Eisbären Bremerhaven
- 2018–2020: s.Oliver Würzburg
- 2020–2022: Riesen Ludwigsburg

Career highlights
- FIBA Europe Cup Fan Vote MVP (2019); Kosovo Superleague champion (2015); Balkan League champion (2015); Senior CLASS Award (2013); Third-team Academic All-American (2013); Indiana Mr. Basketball (2009); IHSAA 4A champion (2009)

Jordan Andrew Hulls (born April 16, 1990) is an American former professional basketball player. He played college basketball for Indiana University, where he currently works as team and recruiting coordinator.

== Personal ==
Hulls is from Bloomington, Indiana and studied exercise science. His grandfather went to Indiana University and became a coach.

== Early career and high school ==
Hulls began receiving basketball instruction at an early age from his father. He attended Bloomington High School South and played basketball. Hulls graduated from high school in 2009.

Following the end of his senior season, Hulls was named Indiana Mr. Basketball. He was also the Gatorade Player of the Year in Indiana. Hulls also played on the Indiana Elite One AAU squad.

== College career ==
On May 20, 2008, Hulls committed to play for Indiana University, turning down an offer from Purdue. Of his commitment to Indiana, he said, "Being a hometown kid, that definitely factored into it. Being a part of bringing the program back to what it used to be appeals to me." Hulls also noted he had been a lifelong Hoosier fan, in part because of his family's connections to the program.

Hulls began playing during the 2009–10 season. He was an Academic All-Big Ten selection the following year. In his junior year at Indiana, the 2011–12 season, Hulls averaged 11.5 points and 3.2 assists. He shot 50.4% from the field, 49.3% from the three-point line, and 89.9% from the free throw line. In the 2012 NCAA Tournament, the Hoosiers lost in the Sweet Sixteen 102–90 to Kentucky.

In his senior year at Indiana, the 2012–13 season, Hulls established himself on a team that finished the regular season first in the Big Ten. Hulls earned All-Big Ten Honorable Mention honors from the coaches and media, a 2012–13 Academic All-America selection, and was a 2012–13 Senior CLASS Award winner.

SEASON AVERAGES
SEASON	TEAM	MIN	FGM-FGA	FG%	3PM-3PA	3P%	FTM-FTA	FT%	REB	AST	BLK	STL	PF	TO	PTS
2012–13	IND	28.8	3.2–7.2	.444	2.2–5.0	.444	1.1–1.4	.776	2.3	3.0	0.0	0.8	1.7	1.2	9.7
2011–12	IND	30.1	4.0–7.9	.504	2.0–4.1	.493	1.7–1.9	.899	2.5	3.3	0.1	1.1	1.9	2.1	11.7
2010–11	IND	31.2	3.8–8.0	.482	1.7–4.2	.414	1.6–1.8	.912	2.3	2.9	0.2	0.9	1.9	1.7	11.0
2009–10	IND	25.1	2.0–5.0	.406	1.5–3.8	.402	0.8–1.0	.800	2.1	1.5	0.0	0.6	1.9	1.2	6.4

== Professional career ==
After going undrafted in the 2013 NBA draft, Hulls signed his first professional contract with Energa Czarni of the Polish Basketball League.

On September 3, 2014, he signed with Sigal Prishtina of the Kosovo Basketball Superleague for the 2014–15 season.

On May 30, 2015, he signed with Limburg United of the Belgian League.

On July 8, 2016, he signed with Eisbären Bremerhaven of the Basketball Bundesliga.

On June 18, 2018, Hulls signed with s.Oliver Würzburg. He won the FIBA Europe Cup Fan Vote MVP.

On October 12, 2020, he has signed with MHP Riesen Ludwigsburg of the Basketball Bundesliga (BBL).

On June 6, 2022, Riesen Ludwigsburg announced the retirement of Hulls as professional basketball player. He currently works as team and recruiting coordinator for Indiana University in his hometown, where he had played earlier.

=== The Basketball Tournament (TBT) (2015–2017) ===
In the summers of 2015, '16, and 2017, Hulls played in The Basketball Tournament on ESPN for team Armored Athlete. He competed for the $2 million prize, and for team Armored Athlete in 2017, he averaged 7.5 points per game. Hulls helped take team Armored Athlete in 2017 to the West Regional Championship, where they lost to Team Challenge ALS 75–63. In TBT 2018, Hulls averaged 8.7 points, 2 rebounds, and 1.3 steals per game for Armored Athlete. They reached the Super 16 before falling to Boeheim's Army.
