= Devin Oliver =

American basketball player (born 1992)

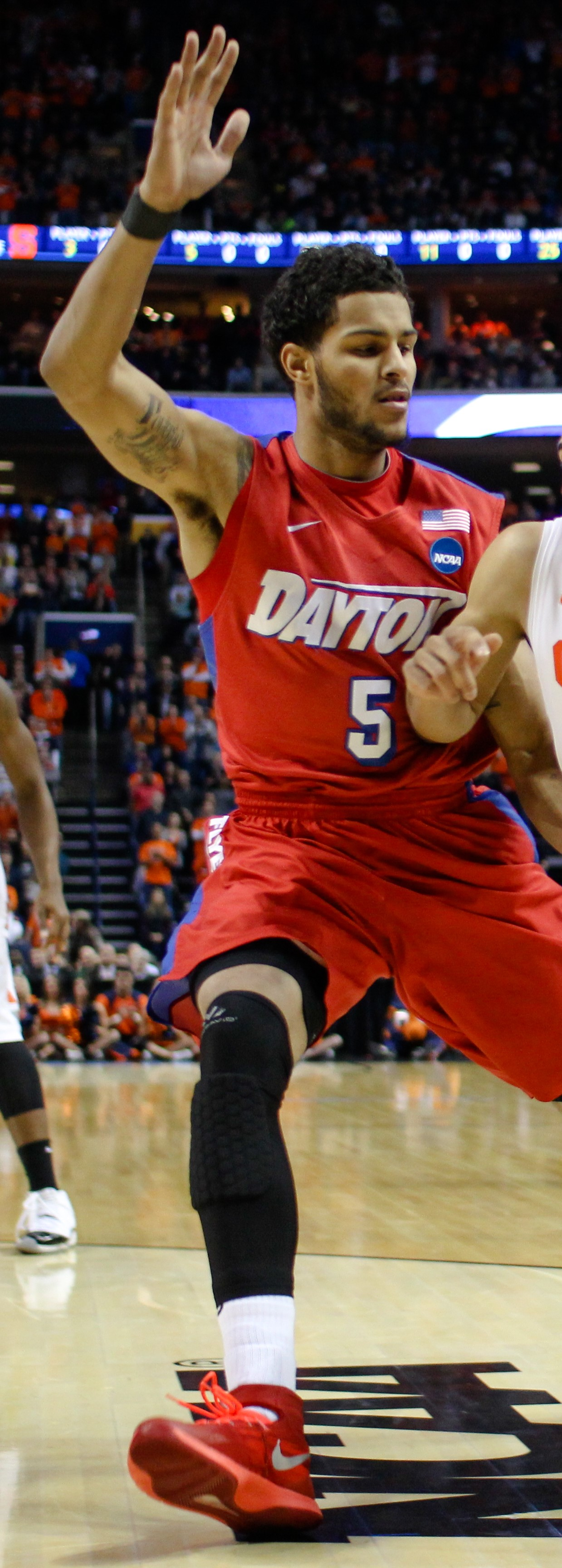
- Oliver playing for Dayton in 2014

No. 15 – SLUC Nancy
- Position: Forward
- League: LNB Élite

Personal information
- Born: July 2, 1992 (age 34) Kalamazoo, Michigan, U.S.
- Listed height: 6 ft 8 in (2.03 m)
- Listed weight: 224.4 lb (102 kg)

Career information
- High school: Kalamazoo Central (Kalamazoo, Michigan)
- College: Dayton (2010–2014)
- NBA draft: 2014: undrafted
- Playing career: 2014–present

Career history
- 2014–2015: Limburg United
- 2015: Maccabi Kiryat Gat
- 2016: Rouen Métropole
- 2016–2018: Olimpija
- 2018–2019: Banvit
- 2019: s.Oliver Würzburg
- 2019–2020: Nanterre 92
- 2020–2021: Büyükçekmece Basketbol
- 2021–2022: Sendai 89ers
- 2022–2024: Yokohama B-Corsairs
- 2024: Taipei Taishin Mars
- 2024–present: SLUC Nancy

Career highlights
- 2x Slovenian League Finals MVP (2017, 2018); 2x Slovenian League champion (2017, 2018); Slovenian Supercup winner (2017); Slovenian Supercup MVP (2017); Slovenian Cup winner (2017)

Devin Michael Oliver (born July 2, 1992) is an American professional basketball player for SLUC Nancy of the LNB Élite. He played college basketball for Dayton.

== College career ==
Oliver played four seasons for the Dayton Flyers. Oliver led the Flyer’s in rebounding (7.4) and assists (2.3), and was second in scoring (11.2) in 2013-14, his senior season.

== Professional career ==
After going undrafted in the 2014 NBA draft, Oliver joined the Boston Celtics for the 2014 NBA Summer League. In July 2014, Oliver signed his first professional contract with Belgium club Limburg United.

In August 2015, Oliver signed with Israeli club Maccabi Kiryat Gat. On December 1, 2015, he parted ways with Maccabi Kiryat Gat. In March 2016, he signed with SPO Rouen Basket of France for the rest of the season.

On August 22, 2016, he signed a one-year deal with Slovenian club Union Olimpija. On July 18, 2017, he re-signed with Olimpija for one more season.

In July 2018, Oliver signed with Turkish club Banvit.

On 29 January 2019, he signed a half-year contract with s.Oliver Würzburg.

On June 27, 2019, he signed a 1-year contract with Nanterre 92 of the LNB Pro A.

On August 3, 2020, Oliver signed a deal with Büyükçekmece Basketbol of the Turkish Basketbol Süper Ligi (BSL) for the 2020-2021 season.

On June 17, 2021, he signed with Sendai 89ers of the B.League.

On July 7, 2022, he signed with Yokohama B-Corsairs of the B.League and he will wear No.15.

On August 3, 2024, Oliver signed with the Taipei Taishin Mars of the Taiwan Professional Basketball League (TPBL). On November 27, Taipei Taishin Mars terminated the contract relationship with Oliver.

== The Basketball Tournament ==
In the summer of 2017, Oliver played in The Basketball Tournament on ESPN for the Broad Street Brawlers. He competed for the $2 million prize, and for the Brawlers, he averaged 9 rebounds per game. Oliver helped the Brawlers reach the second round, only then losing to Team Colorado 111–95.
