= Tectake Arena =

Indoor arena in Würzburg, Germany

Coordinates: 49.7738°N 9.9408°E

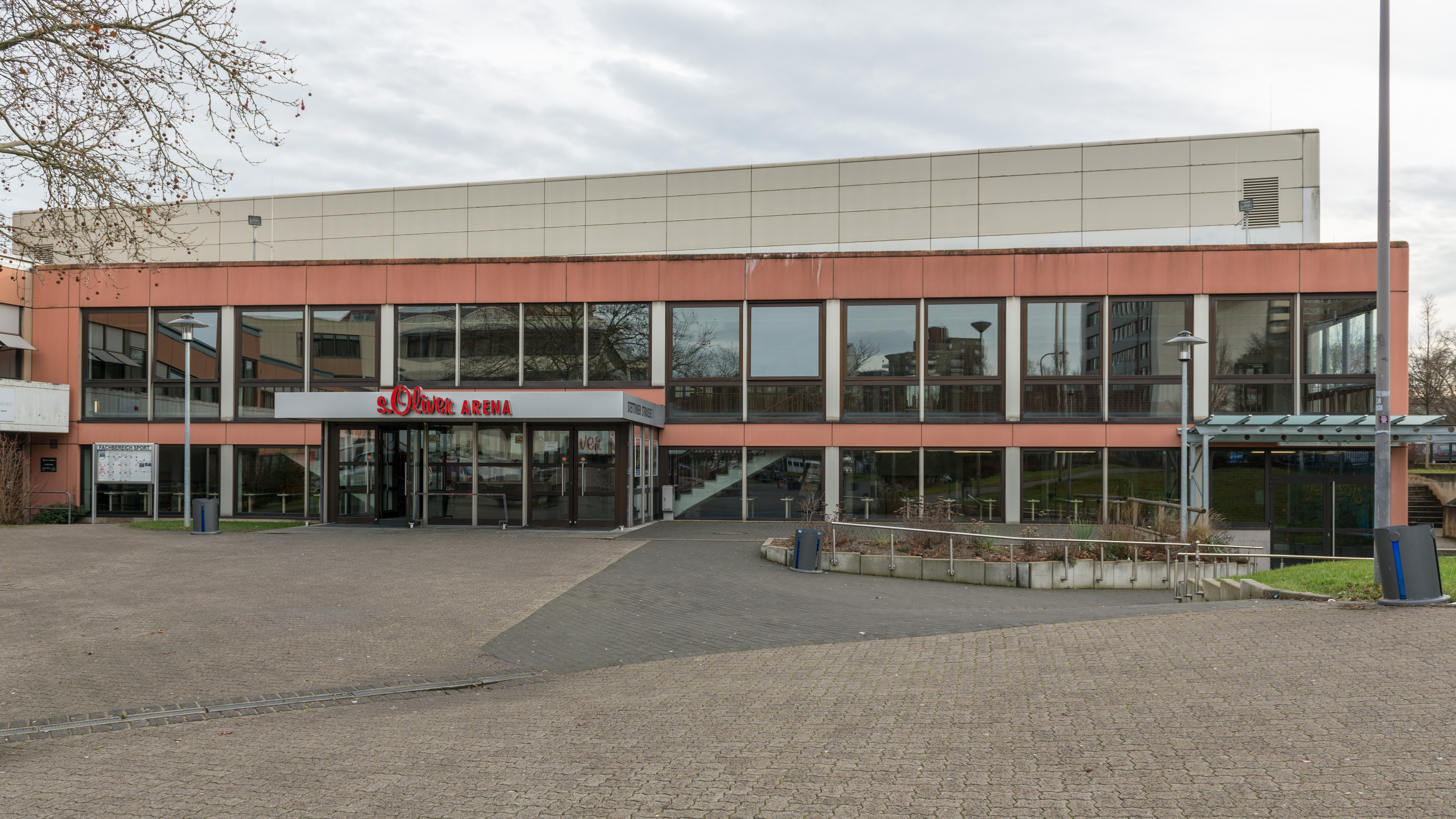
s.Oliver Arena

Tectake Arena (originally known as Carl-Diem-Halle until 2004 due to namesake Carl Diem. The name was changed because of his close relations to Nazism) is a multi-purpose indoor arena located in Würzburg, Germany. The arena opened in 1981 and has a capacity of 4,756 people. Its primary tenants are the Würzburg Baskets, a professional basketball team.

Until 2022, it was known as s.Oliver Arena.
