= Würzburg Baskets =

Professional basketball team in Germany, Würzburg

Fitness First Würzburg Baskets
- Leagues: Basketball Bundesliga; Europe Cup
- Founded: 2007; 19 years ago
- History: List: SCH Würzburg Baskets (2007–2010) s. Oliver Baskets (2010–2016) s. Oliver Würzburg (2016–2023) Würzburg Baskets (2023–2024) FIT/One Würzburg Baskets (2024–2025) Fitness First Würzburg Baskets (2025–present)
- Arena: tectake Arena
- Capacity: 3,140
- Location: Würzburg, Germany
- Team colors: Black, red, white
- Main sponsor: Fitness First
- President: Steffen Liebler
- Head coach: Sašo Filipovski
- Website: www.wuerzburg-baskets.de
Home	Away	Third

Fitness First Würzburg Baskets (formerly known as Würzburg Baskets and s.Oliver Baskets) is a professional basketball club based in Würzburg, Germany. After one year of absence from the Basketball Bundesliga (BBL), the club returned to the first division of German basketball in the 2015–16 season.

It was founded in 2007, with the aim to substitute the original club of the city, who was known as DJK Würzburg, which stood for "Deutsche Jugendkraft" (German youth power), and was affiliated to the DJK-Sportverband (Sport Association), which is affiliated with the Roman Catholic Church in Germany. The club has gained fame through its basketball department, in which NBA players Dirk Nowitzki, Maxi Kleber and Hannes Steinbach got their starts.

== History ==
=== The old DJK Würzburg ===
The DJK Sport Association was founded on 16 September 1920 in Würzburg. Due to the geographic location of its home office, the DJK soon founded a local club in Würzburg. However, the different athletic departments found themselves divided among various Catholic clubs. During the Third Reich, all DJK affiliates were banned by the government. After World War II, the DJK consolidated all of its local departments into DJK Würzburg. Today the club has over 3000 members, including a variety of non-Catholic members.

The club's top women's handball team played in the Handball-Bundesliga Frauen, the top flight of women's handball in Germany, from 1976 to 1985, during the 1987–88 season and from 1993 to 1995.

The club's basketball department gained fame in the 1990s as both the men's and women's teams qualified for the top German Basketball Bundesliga (BBL) division. The women's team played many years in the first and second divisions and was crowned German Champion in 1993. In 1989, the men's team made the jump into the second division. In 1997, featuring Dirk Nowitzki in the line-up, DJK Würzburg claimed the 2nd Division South title, qualifying for the Basketball Bundesliga. In 2001, DJK spun off its men's basketball team into a private corporate entity, now known as the Würzburg Baskets, to capitalise on their growth as a professional basketball team. DJK Würzburg has produced numerous players who have gone on to have success in the BBL, with the senior Germany national team, and for Nowitzki, as well as the NBA.

In 2005, the club resigned its spot in the BBL and the club stopped competing.

=== The current club ===
In 2007, American businessman Jochen Bähr acquired a license in the Regional league for a new team in Würzburg with the aim to reach the Pro A in few seasons.

In 2011, the Würzburg Baskets, now by the name of s.Oliver Baskets (after their new sponsor s.Oliver), gained promotion from the PRO A (German Second Division), and moved up to the Basketball Bundesliga (German First Division). In its first season back in the first division, in 2011–12, the team reached the German League semi-finals, after beating Alba Berlin by 3–1 in the quarter-final series of the playoffs. In 2012–13 the actual club played in Europe for the first time, in the second tier Eurocup. In 2013–14 they relegated from the BBL. They immediately promoted back to the first tier in the 2014–15 season. In the 2015–16 season, the team finished ranked in the top 8, thus qualifying for the playoffs for the second time after 2012. In quarter-finals the team was eliminated by future league champion Brose Baskets, losing every game with at least a 35-point margin.

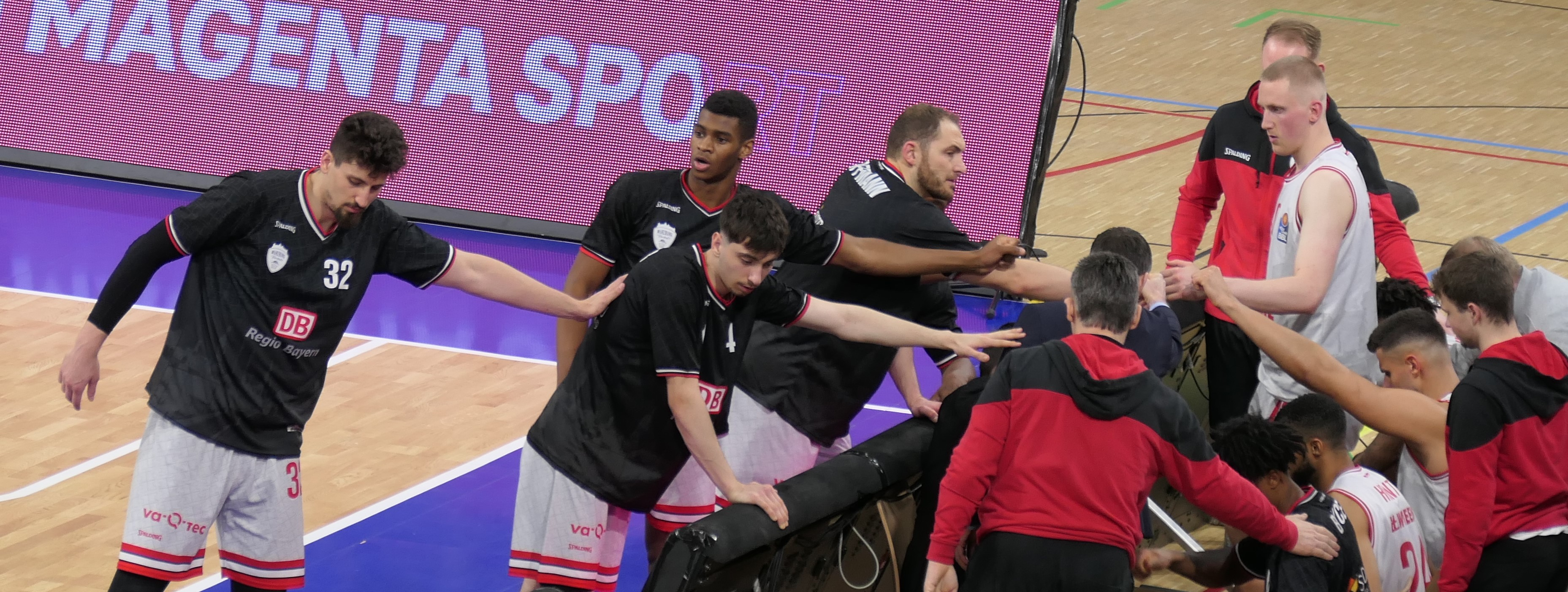
Members of the team in January 2023.

On 15 July 2016 the team changed their name from "s.Oliver Baskets" to "s.Oliver Würzburg" to strengthen the identification of team and city. Additionally, the sponsoring contract with s.Oliver was extended through 2019.

In the 2018–19 season, Würzburg played in the FIBA Europe Cup. Würzburg reached the finals of the cup, its first European finals, in which it lost to Dinamo Sassari over two legs.

During the 2024–25 season, FIT/ONE Würzburg Baskets participated in the Basketball Champions League (BCL) for the first time. They started the regular season in Group A with three other teams: Nanterre 92 from France, Hapoel Holon from Israel, and Igokea from Bosnia and Herzegovina.

On 10 July 2024, the team changed their name from "Würzburg Baskets" to "FIT/One Würzburg Baskets" because of the new name sponsor FIT/One, who is located in the fitness scene. On 1 August 2025, as FIT/One has been joined to Fitness First group, the club name changed to "Fitness First Würzburg Baskets".

== Honours ==
Numerous Bavarian amateur titles Women's German Basketball Champions: 1993 Men's 2nd Division South Basketball Champions: 1997

=== European competitions ===
FIBA Europe Cup

- Runners-up: 2018–19

== Logos ==
2010–2016 Logo

== Season by season ==
Season	Tier	League	Pos.	German Cup	European competitions		
2007–08	4	RegionalLiga	3rd				
2008–09	4	RegionalLiga	1st				
2009–10	3	ProB	3rd				
2010–11	2	ProA	2nd				
2011–12	1	Bundesliga	4th				
2012–13	1	Bundesliga	9th		2 Eurocup	RS	3–3
2013–14	1	Bundesliga	17th				
2014–15	2	ProA	2nd				
2015–16	1	Bundesliga	8th				
2016–17	1	Bundesliga	14th				
2017–18	1	Bundesliga	9th		FIBA Europe Cup	QR1	1–1
2018–19	1	Bundesliga	9th		FIBA Europe Cup	F	Runners-up
2019–20	1	Bundesliga	8th	Round of 16			
2020–21	1	Bundesliga	16th	Group stage			
2021–22	1	Bundesliga	12th	Round of 16			
2022–23	1	Bundesliga	10th	Round of 16			
2023–24	1	Bundesliga	4th	Round of 16			
2024–25	1	Bundesliga	4th	Round of 16	Champions League	R16	6–6
2025–26	1	Bundesliga	5th	Round of 16	Champions League	R16	8–7
2026–27	1	Bundesliga			Champions League	Q	
2026–27	1	Bundesliga			Europe Cup		

== Team ==
=== Current roster ===
Fitness First Würzburg Baskets roster
Players
Coaches

Pos.	No.	Nat.	Name	Ht.	Age
F	0	(United States)	Colbert III, Eddie	2.00 m (6 ft 7 in)	26 – 19 October 2000
G	1	(Germany)	Herzog, Lukas	1.89 m (6 ft 2 in)	25 – 10 September 2001
G/F	2	(United States)	Jones, Max	1.93 m (6 ft 4 in)	24 – 9 April 2002
C	3	(Germany)	Saffer, Leo	2.12 m (6 ft 11 in)	26 – 6 June 2000
G	4	(United States)	Griffin, Sam	1.90 m (6 ft 3 in)	25 – 26 September 2001
G	5	(United States)	Dye, Kenny	1.80 m (5 ft 11 in)	26 – 7 July 2000
F	8	(Germany)	Tischler, Brandon	2.02 m (6 ft 8 in)	26 – 18 August 2000
G	10	(United States)	Wishart, Calvin	1.88 m (6 ft 2 in)	27 – 1 July 1999
G	11	(Germany)	Scheffs, Jervis	1.94 m (6 ft 4 in)	19 – 9 October 2007
SF	13	(Germany) (Croatia)	Petric, Marko	2.03 m (6 ft 8 in)	18 – 21 April 2008
PF	14	(Germany)	Plato, Paul-Julius	2.06 m (6 ft 9 in)	17 – 7 April 2009
G/F	16	(Slovenia)	Ličan, Lon	1.97 m (6 ft 6 in)	21 – 31 January 2005
C	26	(Austria) (Germany)	Ogunsipe, Marvin	2.04 m (6 ft 8 in)	30 – 26 February 1996
F/C	32	(United States)	Thompson, Charles	2.03 m (6 ft 8 in)	25 – 13 February 2001
F	35	(Germany) (Bosnia and Herzegovina)	Pjanic, Alen	2.02 m (6 ft 8 in)	29 – 5 March 1997

Head coach

- (Slovenia) Sašo Filipovski

Assistant coach(es)

- (Slovenia) Dejan Mihevc
- (Poland) Marcin Wit

Legend

- (C) Team captain
- Injured

- Roster
Updated: 14 September 2026

Note: Flags indicate national team eligibility at FIBA-sanctioned events. Players may hold other non-FIBA nationalities not displayed.

=== Depth chart ===
Pos.	Starting 5	Bench 1	Bench 2
C	Marvin Ogunsipe	Aaron Kayser	Leo Saffer
PF	Alen Pjanic	Charles Thompson	Christian Skladanowski
SF	Eddie Colbert III	Brandon Tischler	Lon Ličan
SG	Calvin Wishart	Max Jones	Jervis Scheffs
PG	Lukas Herzog	Kenny Dye	Sam Griffin

== Notable players ==
To appear in this section a player must have played at least two seasons for the club AND either:

– Set a club record or won an individual award as a professional player.
– Played at least one official international match for his senior national team at any time.

- (Germany) Dirk Nowitzki
- (Germany) Robert Garrett
- (Germany) Demond Greene
- (Germany) Steven Hutchinson
- (Germany) Maxi Kleber
- (Germany) Filip Stanic
- (Germany) Denis Wucherer
- (Canada) Owen Klassen
- (Chile) Nico Carvacho
- (Croatia) Krešimir Lončar
- (Nigeria) Olumide Oyedeji
- (United States) Zac Seljaas
- (United States) LaMonte Ulmer
- (United States) Jason Dourisseau

=== Notable coaches ===
- (Canada) Gordon Herbert (2000–2001)
- (Germany) Dirk Bauermann (2017–2018)

=== Second team ===
Würzburg's second team plays in the Regionalliga, the German 4th division.

== Fan culture ==
=== Friendships ===
For many years, the fan-base of Würzburg has been connected, in a friendly way, with the supporters of the Baskets Bonn.

=== Rivalries ===
Within the Basketball Bundesliga, the city closest to Würzburg is Bamberg. Hence, between the Baskets Würzburg and the Baskets Bamberg, there has been an intense rivalry. Traditionally, the rivalry has been dominated by Bamberg because of its superior finances.

== Kit manufacturer ==
2017: KICKZ

2022–present: Spalding
