= 2017–18 Basketball Champions League playoffs =

The 2017–18 Basketball Champions League playoffs began on 6 March, and ended on 6 May, with the Final, to decide the champions of the 2017–18 season of the Basketball Champions League. 16 teams competed in the playoffs.

== Format ==
The playoffs involved the sixteen teams which qualified between the four first teams of each of the four groups in the 2017–18 Basketball Champions League Regular season.

The group winners will face the fourth qualified teams and the runners-up will play against the third qualified teams. Winners and runners-up will play the second leg at home. In addition, the winners of the matches involving the group winners will play also the second leg of the quarterfinals at home.

Each tie in the playoffs, apart from the Final Four games, was played with two legs, with each team playing one leg at home. The team that scored more points on aggregate, over the two legs, advanced to the next round.

For the round of 16, teams from the same group could not be drawn against each other.

== Qualified teams ==
Key to colors
Seeded teams	Unseeded teams	Qualified teams

Group	Winners	Runners-up	Third	Fourth
A	(France) Monaco	(Turkey) Pınar Karşıyaka	(Germany) EWE Baskets Oldenburg	(Spain) UCAM Murcia
B	(Spain) Iberostar Tenerife	(Germany) MHP Riesen Ludwigsburg	(Greece) PAOK	(Lithuania) Neptūnas
C	(France) SIG Strasbourg	(Turkey) Banvit	(Greece) AEK Athens	(Germany) Medi Bayreuth
D	(Turkey) Beşiktaş Sompo Japan	(Czech Republic) ČEZ Nymburk	(France) Nanterre 92	(Poland) Stelmet Enea Zielona Góra

== Bracket ==
Round of 16; 6–7 and 13–14 March
(Germany) EWE Oldenburg	63	86	149
(Germany) Riesen Ludwigsburg	88	74	162
(Germany) medi Bayreuth	81	84	165
(Turkey) Beşiktaş	76	84	160
(France) Nanterre 92	66	64	130
(Turkey) Banvit	74	73	147
(Poland) Zielona Góra	82	60	142
(France) Monaco	84	90	174
(Greece) AEK Athens	88	93	181
(Czech Republic) ČEZ Nymburk	98	82	180
(Lithuania) Neptūnas	73	78	151
(France) SIG Strasbourg	68	88	156
(Greece) PAOK	74	67	141
(Turkey) Pınar Karşıyaka	68	79	147
(Spain) UCAM Murcia	66	83	149
(Spain) Iberostar Tenerife	71	72	143

Quarterfinals; 27–28 March and 3–4 April
(Germany) Riesen Ludwigsburg	81	89	170
(Germany) medi Bayreuth	86	77	163
(Turkey) Banvit	77	75	152
(France) Monaco	85	74	159
(Greece) AEK Athens	78	83	161
(France) SIG Strasbourg	69	83	152
(Turkey) Pınar Karşıyaka	65	72	137
(Spain) UCAM Murcia	79	81	160

Semifinals; 4 May
(Germany) MHP Riesen Ludwigsburg	65
(France) Monaco	87
(Greece) AEK Athens	77
(Spain) UCAM Murcia	75

Final; 6 May
(France) Monaco	94
(Greece) AEK Athens	100
Third place game
(Germany) MHP Riesen Ludwigsburg	74
(Spain) UCAM Murcia	85

== Round of 16 ==
The first legs will be played on 6–7 March, and the second legs will be played on 13–14 March 2018.

Team 1	Agg.	Team 2	1st leg	2nd leg
PAOK (Greece)	141–147	(Turkey) Pınar Karşıyaka	74–68	67–79
Nanterre 92 (France)	130–147	(Turkey) Banvit	66–74	64–73
AEK Athens (Greece)	181–180	(Czech Republic) ČEZ Nymburk	88–98	93–82
EWE Baskets Oldenburg (Germany)	149–162	(Germany) MHP Riesen Ludwigsburg	63–88	86–74
Stelmet Enea Zielona Góra (Poland)	142–174	(France) Monaco	82–84	60–90
medi Bayreuth (Germany)	165–160	(Turkey) Beşiktaş Sompo Japan	81–76	84–84
UCAM Murcia (Spain)	149–143	(Spain) Iberostar Tenerife	66–71	83–72
Neptūnas (Lithuania)	151–156	(France) SIG Strasbourg	73–68	78–88

=== First leg ===
6 March 2018	PAOK (Greece)	74–68	(Turkey) Pınar Karşıyaka	Thessaloniki
18:30	Scoring by quarter: 20–16, 19–21, 16–7, 19–24
	Pts: Goss, Jackson 13; Rebs: Katsivelis 8 Asts: Goss 6 Eff: Krubally 15	Boxscore	Pts: Kennedy 16; Rebs: Jones, Kennedy 8 Asts: Kennedy 4 Eff: Kennedy 16	Arena: PAOK Sports Arena; Attendance: 3,824; Referees: Ademir Zurapović (BIH), Janusz Calik (POL), Marius Ciulin (ROU)

6 March 2018	Stelmet Enea Zielona Góra (Poland)	82–84	(France) Monaco	Zielona Góra
18:30	Scoring by quarter: 17–25, 19–26, 22–16, 24–17
	Pts: Gecevičius 23; Rebs: Dragičević 10; Asts: Koszarek 8 Eff: Gecevičius 24	Boxscore	Pts: Robinson 17; Rebs: Joseph 5 Asts: Craft 5 Eff: Robinson 18	Arena: Hala Zielona Góra; Attendance: 4,245; Referees: Manuel Mazzoni (ITA), Mārtiņš Kozlovskis (LAT), Georgios Poursanidis (GRE)

7 March 2018	Neptūnas (Lithuania)	73–68	(France) SIG Strasbourg	Klaipėda
18:00	Scoring by quarter: 22–12, 16–22, 20–22, 15–12
	Pts: Delininkaitis 19; Rebs: Galdikas 6 Asts: Seibutis 5 Eff: Delininkaitis 18	Boxscore	Pts: Logan 19; Rebs: Labeyrie, Wright 7 Asts: Bost 6 Eff: Logan 18	Arena: Švyturio Arena; Attendance: 5,000; Referees: Vicente Bultó (ESP), Aleksandar Glišić (SRB), Zafer Yılmaz (TUR)

7 March 2018	AEK Athens (Greece)	88–98	(Czech Republic) ČEZ Nymburk	Athens
18:30	Scoring by quarter: 14–21, 16–25, 27–23, 31–29
	Pts: Harris 25; Rebs: Harris 6 Asts: Green 9 Eff: Harris 34	Boxscore	Pts: Ray 30; Rebs: Benda 9 Asts: Lawrence 8 Eff: Ray 33	Arena: Olympic Sports Center; Attendance: 5,000; Referees: Srđan Dožai (CRO), Marek Cmikiewicz (POL), Tolga Sahin (ITA)

7 March 2018	EWE Baskets Oldenburg (Germany)	63–88	(Germany) MHP Riesen Ludwigsburg	Oldenburg
20:00	Scoring by quarter: 12–26, 18–17, 23–19, 10–26
	Pts: Paulding 15; Rebs: Mahalbašić 6 Asts: Mahalbašić 5 Eff: Mahalbašić 15	Boxscore	Pts: Sears 21; Rebs: Walkup 10; Asts: Walkup 10; Eff: Cook 29	Arena: Große EWE Arena; Attendance: 6,069; Referees: Yohan Rosso (FRA), Petar Obradović (BIH), Sergiy Zashchuk (UKR)

7 March 2018	medi Bayreuth (Germany)	81–76	(Turkey) Beşiktaş Sompo Japan	Bayreuth
20:00	Scoring by quarter: 20–14, 14–15, 30–23, 17–24
	Pts: York 20; Rebs: Brooks, Seiferth 7 Asts: three players 3 Eff: Brooks 22	Boxscore	Pts: Strawberry 18; Rebs: Clark 7 Asts: three players 3 Eff: Veyseloğlu 16	Arena: Oberfrankenhalle; Attendance: 4,000; Referees: Panagiotis Anastopoulos (GRE), Andris Aunkrogers (LAT), Tanel Suslov (EST)

7 March 2018	Nanterre 92 (France)	66–74	(Turkey) Banvit	Nanterre
20:30	Scoring by quarter: 16–21, 17–22, 19–11, 14–20
	Pts: Jones 18; Rebs: Shuler 5 Asts: Shuler 6 Eff: Jones 18	Boxscore	Pts: Vidmar 18; Rebs: Caloiaro, Thomas 9 Asts: Taylor 6 Eff: Caloiaro 19	Arena: Maurice Thorez; Attendance: 1,829; Referees: Antonio Conde (ESP), Fernando Calatrava (ESP), Saša Maričić (SRB)

7 March 2018	UCAM Murcia (Spain)	66–71	(Spain) Iberostar Tenerife	Murcia
20:30	Scoring by quarter: 14–15, 22–23, 14–18, 16–15
	Pts: Benite 11; Rebs: Rojas 9 Asts: Rojas 3 Eff: Rojas 16	Boxscore	Pts: Abromaitis 13; Rebs: Vázquez 7 Asts: White 5 Eff: Tobey 18	Arena: Palacio de Deportes; Attendance: 6,958; Referees: Tomas Jasevičius (LTU), Lorenzo Baldini (ITA), Gentian Cici (ALB)

=== Second leg ===
13 March 2018	Beşiktaş Sompo Japan (Turkey)	84–84 (160–165 agg.)	(Germany) medi Bayreuth	Istanbul
18:00	Scoring by quarter: 18–20, 21–17, 20–26, 25–21
	Pts: Strawberry 23; Rebs: Lalanne 7 Asts: Adams 8 Eff: Lalanne 25	Boxscore	Pts: York 17; Rebs: Brooks, York 5 Asts: three players 3 Eff: York 19	Arena: Akatlar Arena; Attendance: 3,100; Referees: Yohan Rosso (FRA), Gentian Cici (ALB), Ademir Zurapović (BIH)

13 March 2018	MHP Riesen Ludwigsburg (Germany)	74–86 (162–149 agg.)	(Germany) EWE Baskets Oldenburg	Ludwigsburg
20:00	Scoring by quarter: 18–15, 30–31, 14–19, 12–21
	Pts: Peter-McNeilly 18; Rebs: Cook 7 Asts: Cook, Johnson 4 Eff: Peter-McNeilly, Cook 17	Boxscore	Pts: Paulding 17; Rebs: De Zeeuw, Moore 9 Asts: Massenat 6 Eff: Massenat, McConnell 18	Arena: Arena Ludwigsburg; Attendance: 2,129; Referees: Georgios Poursanidis (GRE), Panagiotis Anastopoulos (GRE), Saverio Lanzarini (ITA)

13 March 2018	Monaco (France)	90–60 (174–142 agg.)	(Poland) Stelmet Enea Zielona Góra	Fontvieille, Monaco
20:30	Scoring by quarter: 25–21, 25–10, 26–14, 14–13
	Pts: Lacombe 18; Rebs: Cooper 7 Asts: Cooper 10; Eff: Lacombe 22	Boxscore	Pts: Gecevičius 14; Rebs: Dragičević 7 Asts: Florence 4 Eff: Gecevičius 12	Arena: Salle Gaston Médecin; Attendance: 2,400; Referees: Tomas Jasevičius (LTU), Marius Ciulin (ROU), Martin Horozov (BUL)

14 March 2018	Pınar Karşıyaka (Turkey)	79–67 (147–141 agg.)	(Greece) PAOK	İzmir
18:00	Scoring by quarter: 20–13, 23–20, 12–15, 24–19
	Pts: Jones 24; Rebs: Jones 9 Asts: Uğurlu 8 Eff: Jones 27	Boxscore	Pts: Goss 14; Rebs: Margaritis 7 Asts: Koniaris 3 Eff: Jackson 12	Arena: Karşıyaka Arena; Attendance: 5,000; Referees: Srđan Dožai (CRO), Mārtiņš Kozlovskis (LAT), Saša Maričić (SRB)

14 March 2018	Banvit (Turkey)	73–64 (147–130 agg.)	(France) Nanterre 92	Bandırma
18:00	Scoring by quarter: 12–15, 27–15, 16–20, 18–14
	Pts: Kulig, Thomas 15; Rebs: Thomas 9 Asts: Taylor 6 Eff: Thomas 21	Boxscore	Pts: Jones 18; Rebs: Jones 9 Asts: Schaffartzik 7 Eff: Schaffartzik 19	Arena: Kara Ali Acar; Attendance: 1,800; Referees: Vicente Bultó (ESP), Andris Aunkrogers (LAT), Petar Obradović (BIH)

14 March 2018	ČEZ Nymburk (Czech Republic)	82–93 (180–181 agg.)	(Greece) AEK Athens	Nymburk
18:30	Scoring by quarter: 21–22, 19–20, 28–22, 14–29
	Pts: Ray 18; Rebs: Hruban 8 Asts: Lawrence 5 Eff: Hruban 17	Boxscore	Pts: Harris 36; Rebs: three players 4 Asts: Green 6 Eff: Harris 32	Arena: Sportovní Centrum; Attendance: 1,350; Referees: Manuel Mazzoni (ITA), Lorenzo Baldini (ITA), Boris Krejič (SLO)

14 March 2018	Iberostar Tenerife (Spain)	72–83 (143–149 agg.)	(Spain) UCAM Murcia	San Cristóbal de La Laguna
20:30	Scoring by quarter: 18–15, 15–25, 13–26, 26–27
	Pts: Ponitka 16; Rebs: Tobey 13; Asts: San Miguel 5 Eff: Tobey 20	Boxscore	Pts: Oleson 20; Rebs: Lima 9 Asts: Urtasun 6 Eff: Oleson 22	Arena: Santiago Martín; Attendance: 4,869; Referees: Aleksandar Glišić (SRB), Marek Cmikiewicz (POL), Tanel Suslov (EST)

14 March 2018	SIG Strasbourg (France)	88–78(OT) (156–151 agg.)	(Lithuania) Neptūnas	Strasbourg
20:30	Scoring by quarter: 13–19, 17–24, 21–14, 24–13, Overtime: 13–8
	Pts: Inglis 21; Rebs: Labeyrie 8 Asts: Bost 10; Eff: Inglis 26	Boxscore	Pts: Želionis 17; Rebs: Želionis 8 Asts: Johnson 5 Eff: Želionis 15	Arena: Rhénus Sport; Attendance: 5,709; Referees: Antonio Conde (ESP), Özlem Yalman (TUR), Yener Yılmaz (TUR)

== Quarterfinals ==
The first legs will be played on 27–28 March, and the second legs will be played on 3–4 April 2018.

Team 1	Agg.	Team 2	1st leg	2nd leg
Banvit (Turkey)	152–159	(France) Monaco	77–85	75–74
Pınar Karşıyaka (Turkey)	137–160	(Spain) UCAM Murcia	65–79	72–81
AEK Athens (Greece)	161–152	(France) SIG Strasbourg	78–69	83–83
MHP Riesen Ludwigsburg (Germany)	170–163	(Germany) medi Bayreuth	81–86	89–77

=== First leg ===
27 March 2018	Pınar Karşıyaka (Turkey)	65–79	(Spain) UCAM Murcia	İzmir
20:00	Scoring by quarter: 15–26, 15–23, 21–14, 14–16
	Pts: Jones 16; Rebs: Jones, Kennedy 6 Asts: Kennedy, Waters 3 Eff: Jones 14	Boxscore	Pts: Lima 24; Rebs: Lima 7 Asts: Hannah 8 Eff: Lima 25	Arena: Karşıyaka Arena; Attendance: 5,000; Referees: Manuel Mazzoni (ITA), Andris Aunkrogers (LAT), Boris Krejič (SLO)

27 March 2018	MHP Riesen Ludwigsburg (Germany)	81–86	(Germany) medi Bayreuth	Ludwigsburg
20:00	Scoring by quarter: 18–10, 23–23, 21–24, 19–29
	Pts: Walkup 19; Rebs: Cook 9 Asts: Johnson 9 Eff: Walkup 25	Boxscore	Pts: York 18; Rebs: Linhart 5 Asts: Robinson 5 Eff: York 17	Arena: Arena Ludwigsburg; Attendance: 2,480; Referees: Srđan Dožai (CRO), Antonio Conde (ESP), Saša Maričić (SRB)

28 March 2018	Banvit (Turkey)	77–85	(France) Monaco	Bandırma
18:30	Scoring by quarter: 21–21, 20–26, 14–17, 22–21
	Pts: Rautins 17; Rebs: Caloiaro, Vidmar 7 Asts: Taylor 4 Eff: Caloiaro 20	Boxscore	Pts: Kikanović 20; Rebs: Kikanović 6 Asts: Cooper 10; PIR: Cooper 23	Arena: Kara Ali Acar; Attendance: 2,000; Referees: Saverio Lanzarini (ITA), Lorenzo Baldini (ITA), Luis Castillo (ESP)

28 March 2018	AEK Athens (Greece)	78–69	(France) SIG Strasbourg	Athens
18:30	Scoring by quarter: 23–15, 18–18, 14–24, 23–12
	Pts: Punter 15; Rebs: Šakota, Vasilopoulos 7 Asts: Green 5 Eff: Šakota 16	Boxscore	Pts: Labeyrie, Wright 15; Rebs: Wright 7 Asts: Bost, Wright 6 PIR: Wright 22	Arena: Olympic Sports Center; Attendance: 11,000; Referees: Tomas Jasevičius (LTU), Ademir Zurapović (BIH), Mārtiņš Kozlovskis (LAT)

=== Second leg ===
3 April 2018	Monaco (France)	74–75 (159–152 agg.)	(Turkey) Banvit	Fontvieille, Monaco
20:30	Scoring by quarter: 28–15, 9–27, 15–13, 22–20
	Pts: Robinson 30; Rebs: Lacombe 8 Asts: Craft 5 Eff: Robinson 34	Boxscore	Pts: Rautins 19; Rebs: Kulig 7 Asts: Taylor 8 Eff: Rautins, Taylor 19	Arena: Salle Gaston Médecin; Attendance: 2,166; Referees: Antonio Conde (ESP), Marek Cmikiewicz (POL), Gentian Cici (ALB)

4 April 2018	medi Bayreuth (Germany)	77–89 (163–170 agg.)	(Germany) MHP Riesen Ludwigsburg	Oberfrankenhalle
20:00	Scoring by quarter: 20–20, 22–23, 18–19, 17–27
	Pts: Robinson 19; Rebs: Marei 8 Asts: York 5 Eff: Robinson 21	Boxscore	Pts: Johnson 16; Rebs: Waleskowski 10; Asts: Walkup 5 Eff: Sears 22	Arena: Bayreuth; Attendance: 3,400; Referees: Tolga Sahin (ITA), Oskars Lucis (LAT), Mārtiņš Kozlovskis (LAT)

4 April 2018	UCAM Murcia (Spain)	81–72 (160–137 agg.)	(Turkey) Pınar Karşıyaka	Murcia
20:30	Scoring by quarter: 18–12, 13–17, 21–26, 29–17
	Pts: Oleson 16; Rebs: Lima 9 Asts: Hannah 6 Eff: Oleson 18	Boxscore	Pts: Kennedy 18; Rebs: Jones 6 Asts: Kennedy 4 Eff: Kennedy 18	Arena: Palacio de Deportes; Attendance: 7,189; Referees: Tomas Jasevičius (LTU), Petar Obradović (BIH), Sergiy Zashchuk (UKR)

4 April 2018	SIG Strasbourg (France)	83–83 (152–161 agg.)	(Greece) AEK Athens	Strasbourg
20:30	Scoring by quarter: 16–20, 19–17, 24–19, 24–27
	Pts: Labeyrie 19; Rebs: Bilan 9 Asts: Bost 9 Eff: Bost, Labeyrie 22	Boxscore	Pts: Punter 18; Rebs: Šakota, Vasilopoulos 5 Asts: Green 6 Eff: Hunter, Šakota 14	Arena: Rhénus Sport; Attendance: 6,122; Referees: Srđan Dožai (CRO), Marius Ciulin (ROU), Andris Aunkrogers (LAT)

== Final Four ==
Semifinals
4 May
(Germany) MHP Riesen Ludwigsburg	65
(France) Monaco	87
4 May
(Greece) AEK Athens	77
(Spain) UCAM Murcia	75

Final
6 May
(France) Monaco	94
(Greece) AEK Athens	100
Third place game
6 May
(Germany) MHP Riesen Ludwigsburg	74
(Spain) UCAM Murcia	85
