= 2018 BBL Playoffs =

German basketball postseason

Tournament details
- Country: Germany
- Dates: 5 May – 16 June
- Teams: 8
- Defending champions: Brose Bamberg

Final positions
- Champions: Bayern Munich
- Runners-up: Alba Berlin
- Semifinalists: Brose Bamberg; MHP Riesen Ludwigsburg

The 2018 BBL Playoffs was the concluding postseason of the 2017–18 Basketball Bundesliga season. The Playoffs started on 5 May and ended on 16 June 2018.

== Bracket ==
Quarterfinals; 5–19 May
1	Bayern Munich	3
8	Fraport Skyliners	2
4	Brose Bamberg	3
5	Telekom Baskets Bonn	0
2	Alba Berlin	3
7	EWE Baskets Oldenburg	2
3	MHP Riesen Ludwigsburg	3
6	Medi Bayreuth	0

Semifinals; 20–31 May
1	Bayern Munich	3
4	Brose Bamberg	1
2	Alba Berlin	3
3	MHP Riesen Ludwigsburg	0

Finals; 3–16 June
1	Bayern Munich	3
2	Alba Berlin	2

== Quarterfinals ==
The quarterfinals were played in a best of five format from 5 to 19 May 2018.

=== Bayern Munich vs Fraport Skyliners ===
5 May 2018
20:30

Boxscore

Bayern Munich	85–72	Fraport Skyliners
Scoring by quarter: 16–27, 27–17, 24–15, 18–13
Pts: Vladimir Lučić 21; Rebs: Devin Booker 10; Asts: Stefan Jović 9		Pts: Tai Webster 22; Rebs: Quantez Robertson 10; Asts: Tai Webster 4
Munich leads series 1–0

Audi Dome, Munich
Attendance: 6,324
Referees: Moritz Reiter, Oliver Krause, Julian Groll

9 May 2018
18:15

Boxscore

Fraport Skyliners	75–69	Bayern Munich
Scoring by quarter: 17–15, 25–20, 17–17, 16–17
Pts: Philip Scrubb 15; Rebs: Shawn Huff 8 Asts: three players 3		Pts: Jared Cunningham 14; Rebs: Stefan Jović 9 Asts: Reggie Redding 4
Series tied, 1–1

Fraport Arena, Frankfurt
Attendance: 4,640
Referees: Robert Lottermoser, Clemens Fritz, Steve Bittner

12 May 2018
20:30

Boxscore

Bayern Munich	83–86	Fraport Skyliners
Scoring by quarter: 13–12, 26–13, 22–32, 22–29
Pts: Jared Cunningham 20; Rebs: Devin Booker 6 Asts: Braydon Hobbs 7		Pts: Tai Webster 20; Rebs: Mike Morrison 7 Asts: Philip Scrubb 7
Frankfurt leads series 2–1

Audi Dome, Munich
Attendance: 6,018
Referees: Anne Panther, Nesa Kovačević, Johannes Hack

15 May 2018
19:00

Boxscore

Fraport Skyliners	50–85	Bayern Munich
Scoring by quarter: 17–23, 11–24, 15–23, 7–15
Pts: Quantez Robertson 12; Rebs: Niklas Kiel 6 Asts: Philip Scrubb 2		Pts: Booker, Cunningham 15; Rebs: Danilo Barthel 9 Asts: three players 3
Series tied, 2–2

Fraport Arena, Frankfurt
Attendance: 5,002
Referees: Martin Matip, Toni Rodriguez, Christof Madinger

17 May 2018
20:30

Boxscore

Bayern Munich	90–70	Fraport Skyliners
Scoring by quarter: 16–26, 23–11, 20–15, 31–18
Pts: Stefan Jović 19; Rebs: Danilo Barthel 8 Asts: Stefan Jović 10		Pts: Quantez Robertson 19; Rebs: Shawn Huff 9 Asts: Philip Scrubb 8
Munich wins series 3–2

Audi Dome, Munich
Attendance: 5,534
Referees: Toni Rodriguez, Christof Madinger, Carsten Straube

=== Alba Berlin vs EWE Baskets Oldenburg ===
5 May 2018
18:15

Boxscore

Alba Berlin	114–88	EWE Baskets Oldenburg
Scoring by quarter: 35–19, 34–24, 18–19, 27–26
Pts: three players 14; Rebs: Luke Sikma 8 Asts: Peyton Siva 7		Pts: Frantz Massenat 20; Rebs: Armani Moore 5 Asts: Karsten Tadda 5
Berlin leads series 1–0

Mercedes-Benz Arena, Berlin
Attendance: 8,772
Referees: Toni Rodriguez, Clemens Fritz, Steve Bittner

8 May 2018
18:15

Boxscore

EWE Baskets Oldenburg	105–100 (OT)	Alba Berlin
Scoring by quarter: 21–29, 23–22, 28–20, 20–21, Overtime: 13–8
Pts: Rašid Mahalbašić 28; Rebs: Mahalbašić, Tadda 5 Asts: Mickey McConnell 7		Pts: Peyton Siva 21; Rebs: Grigonis, Sikma 7 Asts: Peyton Siva 8
Series tied, 1–1

Große EWE Arena, Oldenburg
Attendance: 5,531
Referees: Anne Panther, Christof Madinger, Julian Groll

12 May 2018
18:00

Boxscore

Alba Berlin	96–79	EWE Baskets Oldenburg
Scoring by quarter: 26–19, 22–23, 25–18, 23–19
Pts: Luke Sikma 18; Rebs: Luke Sikma 11; Asts: Peyton Siva 7		Pts: Rickey Paulding 19; Rebs: Rickey Paulding 6 Asts: Mickey McConnell 6
Berlin leads series 2–1

Mercedes-Benz Arena, Berlin
Attendance: 8,891
Referees: Martin Matip, Carsten Straube, Moritz Krüper

15 May 2018
19:00

Boxscore

EWE Baskets Oldenburg	97–85	Alba Berlin
Scoring by quarter: 26–24, 22–29, 29–10, 20–22
Pts: Rašid Mahalbašić 19; Rebs: Rašid Mahalbašić 7 Asts: Mickey McConnell 9		Pts: Peyton Siva 14; Rebs: Marius Grigonis 5 Asts: Sikma, Siva 6
Series tied, 2–2

Große EWE Arena, Oldenburg
Attendance: 6,000
Referees: Robert Lottermoser, Oliver Krause, Nesa Kovačević

17 May 2018
19:00

Boxscore

Alba Berlin	85–68	EWE Baskets Oldenburg
Scoring by quarter: 17–19, 28–16, 18–17, 22–16
Pts: Marius Grigonis 16; Rebs: Luke Sikma 7 Asts: Stefan Peno 5		Pts: Rickey Paulding 18; Rebs: Rašid Mahalbašić 6 Asts: Mickey McConnell 6
Berlin wins series 3–2

Mercedes-Benz Arena, Berlin
Attendance: 8,115
Referees: Anne Panther, Moritz Reiter, Oliver Krause

=== Riesen Ludwigsburg vs Medi Bayreuth ===
10 May 2018
18:15

Boxscore

Riesen Ludwigsburg	104–85	Medi Bayreuth
Scoring by quarter: 34–19, 19–24, 28–24, 23–18
Pts: Elgin Cook 26; Rebs: Cook, Walkup 6 Asts: Thomas Walkup 7		Pts: Gabe York 22; Rebs: Andreas Seiferth 7 Asts: Robinson, Seiferth 4
Ludwigsburg leads series 1–0

Arena Ludwigsburg, Ludwigsburg
Attendance: 3,244
Referees: Anne Panther, Carsten Straube, Enrico Streit

12 May 2018
18:15

Boxscore

Medi Bayreuth	74–79	Riesen Ludwigsburg
Scoring by quarter: 25–15, 16–25, 17–20, 16–19
Pts: De'Mon Brooks 24; Rebs: Assem Marei 6 Asts: Robinson, York 4		Pts: Elgin Cook 18; Rebs: Dwayne Evans 8 Asts: Evans, Johnson 6
Ludwigsburg leads series 2–0

Oberfrankenhalle, Bayreuth
Attendance: 3,034
Referees: Robert Lottermoser, Oliver Krause, Tamer Arik

15 May 2018
20:30

Boxscore

Riesen Ludwigsburg	95–70	Medi Bayreuth
Scoring by quarter: 21–19, 21–22, 26–9, 27–20
Pts: Dwayne Evans 23; Rebs: Dwayne Evans 7 Asts: Kerron Johnson 6		Pts: Brooks, Seiferth 14; Rebs: Nate Linhart 7 Asts: Bastian Doreth 4
Ludwigsburg wins series 3–0

Arena Ludwigsburg, Ludwigsburg
Attendance: 3,253
Referees: Clemens Fritz, Moritz Reiter, Steve Bittner

=== Brose Bamberg vs Telekom Baskets Bonn ===
6 May 2018
17:30

Boxscore

Brose Bamberg	87–85	Telekom Baskets Bonn
Scoring by quarter: 22–21, 26–20, 17–19, 22–14
Pts: Dorell Wright 24; Rebs: Leon Radošević 7 Asts: Nikos Zisis 9		Pts: Gamble, Mayo 14; Rebs: Julian Gamble 6 Asts: T. J. DiLeo 4
Bamberg leads series 1–0

Brose Arena, Bamberg
Attendance: 6,150
Referees: Robert Lottermoser, Johannes Hack, Tamer Arik

9 May 2018
20:30

Boxscore

Telekom Baskets Bonn	82–90	Brose Bamberg
Scoring by quarter: 24–27, 26–19, 20–17, 12–27
Pts: Julian Gamble 18; Rebs: Julian Gamble 7 Asts: Julian Gamble 4		Pts: Dorell Wright 21; Rebs: Dorell Wright 10; Asts: Nikos Zisis 4
Bamberg leads series 2–0

Telekom Dome, Bonn
Attendance: 6,000
Referees: Martin Matip, Nesa Kovačević, Moritz Krüper

12 May 2018
14:15

Boxscore

Brose Bamberg	75–70	Telekom Baskets Bonn
Scoring by quarter: 18–16, 20–20, 18–16, 19–18
Pts: Dorell Wright 17; Rebs: Wright, Zisis 8 Asts: Daniel Hackett 6		Pts: DiLeo, Gamble 12; Rebs: Bartolo, Gamble 8 Asts: DiLeo 3
Bamberg wins series 3–0

Brose Arena, Bamberg
Attendance: 6,150
Referees: Moritz Reiter, Christof Madinger, Enrico Streit

== Semifinals ==
The semifinals were played in a best of five format from 20 to 31 May 2018.

=== Bayern Munich vs Brose Bamberg ===
20 May 2018
18:00

Boxscore

Bayern Munich	95–72	Brose Bamberg
Scoring by quarter: 22–16, 23–20, 30–17, 20–19
Pts: Jared Cunningham 26; Rebs: Devin Booker 6 Asts: Braydon Hobbs 6		Pts: Daniel Hackett 25; Rebs: four players 4 Asts: Nikos Zisis 4
Munich leads series 1–0

Audi Dome, Munich
Attendance: 6,083
Referees: Anne Panther, Oliver Krause, Enrico Streit

23 May 2018
20:00

Boxscore

Brose Bamberg	78–65	Bayern Munich
Scoring by quarter: 16–19, 18–16, 25–24, 19–6
Pts: Dorell Wright 22; Rebs: Augustine Rubit 9 Asts: Daniel Hackett 6		Pts: Jared Cunningham 16; Rebs: Devin Booker 6 Asts: Reggie Redding 6
Series tied, 1–1

Brose Arena, Bamberg
Attendance: 6,150
Referees: Robert Lottermoser, Nesa Kovačević, Carsten Straube

26 May 2018
18:00

Boxscore

Bayern Munich	99–67	Brose Bamberg
Scoring by quarter: 26–13, 22–15, 18–10, 23–29
Pts: Booker, Cunningham 15; Rebs: Devin Booker 7 Asts: Stefan Jović 6		Pts: Augustine Rubit 15; Rebs: Augustine Rubit 5 Asts: five players 2
Munich leads series 2–1

Audi Dome, Munich
Attendance: 6,271
Referees: Clemens Fritz, Moritz Reiter, Christof Madinger

29 May 2018
19:00

Boxscore

Brose Bamberg	79–83	Bayern Munich
Scoring by quarter: 33–17, 19–21, 17–25, 10–20
Pts: Dorell Wright 26; Rebs: three players 5 Asts: Nikos Zisis 4		Pts: Danilo Barthel 19; Rebs: Danilo Barthel 7 Asts: Jović, Redding 5
Munich wins series 3–1

Brose Arena, Bamberg
Attendance: 6,150
Referees: Robert Lottermoser, Martin Matip, Toni Rodriguez

=== Alba Berlin vs Riesen Ludwigsburg ===
21 May 2018
18:00

Boxscore

Alba Berlin	102–87	Riesen Ludwigsburg
Scoring by quarter: 27–23, 30–23, 22–28, 23–13
Pts: Luke Sikma 19; Rebs: Sikma, Siva 6 Asts: Peyton Siva 9		Pts: Dwayne Evans 17; Rebs: Cook, Waleskowski 6 Asts: Thomas Walkup 5
Berlin leads series 1–0

Mercedes-Benz Arena, Berlin
Attendance: 8,210
Referees: Martin Matip, Toni Rodriguez, Christof Madinger

24 May 2018
20:00

Boxscore

Riesen Ludwigsburg	74–100	Alba Berlin
Scoring by quarter: 8–28, 29–14, 12–30, 25–28
Pts: Elgin Cook 21; Rebs: Peter-McNeilly, Walkup 6 Asts: Thomas Walkup 6		Pts: Spencer Butterfield 17; Rebs: Luke Sikma 7 Asts: Sikma, Siva 7
Berlin leads series 2–0

Arena Ludwigsburg, Ludwigsburg
Attendance: 4,023
Referees: Moritz Reiter, Clemens Fritz, Steve Bittner

27 May 2018
15:00

Boxscore

Alba Berlin	91–88	Riesen Ludwigsburg
Scoring by quarter: 27–23, 15–20, 25–14, 24–31
Pts: Spencer Butterfield 19; Rebs: Spencer Butterfield 7 Asts: Peyton Siva 11		Pts: Dwayne Evans 18; Rebs: Peter-McNeilly, Waleskowski 6 Asts: Kerron Johnson 8
Berlin wins series 3–0

Mercedes-Benz Arena, Berlin
Attendance: 10,387
Referees: Anne Panther, Oliver Krause, Enrico Streit

== Finals ==
The finals were played in a best of five format from 3 to 16 June 2018.

3 June 2018
15:00

Boxscore

Bayern Munich	95–106 (OT)	Alba Berlin
Scoring by quarter: 21–20, 17–26, 24–18, 25–23, Overtime: 8–19
Pts: Nihad Đedović 18; Rebs: Devin Booker 7 Asts: Stefan Jović 7		Pts: Marius Grigonis 30; Rebs: Luke Sikma 7 Asts: Luke Sikma 7
Berlin leads series 1–0

Audi Dome, Munich
Attendance: 6,054
Referees: Anne Panther, Oliver Krause, Enrico Streit

7 June 2018
19:00

Boxscore

Alba Berlin	69–96	Bayern Munich
Scoring by quarter: 9–26, 20–18, 23–26, 17–26
Pts: Bogdan Radosavljević 14; Rebs: Bogdan Radosavljević 5 Asts: Peyton Siva 6		Pts: Jared Cunningham 17; Rebs: Danilo Barthel 6 Asts: Stefan Jović 9
Series tied, 1–1

Mercedes-Benz Arena, Berlin
Attendance: 13,251
Referees: Robert Lottermoser, Moritz Reiter, Toni Rodriguez

10 June 2018
18:30

Boxscore

Bayern Munich	72–66	Alba Berlin
Scoring by quarter: 25–16, 21–13, 15–19, 11–18
Pts: Reggie Redding 18; Rebs: Devin Booker 7 Asts: Stefan Jović 4		Pts: Spencer Butterfield 16; Rebs: Luke Sikma 5 Asts: Luke Sikma 7
Munich leads series 2–1

Audi Dome, Munich
Attendance: 6,500
Referees: Martin Matip, Anne Panther, Clemens Fritz

13 June 2018
20:00

Boxscore

Alba Berlin	72–68	Bayern Munich
Scoring by quarter: 12–14, 17–20, 22–19, 21–15
Pts: Niels Giffey 20; Rebs: Luke Sikma 8 Asts: Marius Grigonis 6		Pts: Barthel, Cunningham 11; Rebs: Maik Zirbes 7 Asts: Jović, Redding 4
Series tied, 2–2

Mercedes-Benz Arena, Berlin
Attendance: 11,722
Referees: Robert Lottermoser, Toni Rodriguez, Moritz Reiter

16 June 2018
20:30

Boxscore

Bayern Munich	106–85	Alba Berlin
Scoring by quarter: 32–19, 26–20, 28–22, 20–24
Pts: Nihad Đedović 19; Rebs: three players 5 Asts: three players 6		Pts: Spencer Butterfield 29; Rebs: Butterfield, Clifford 5 Asts: Grigonis, Siva 4
Munich wins series 3–2

Audi Dome, Munich
Attendance: 6,500
Referees: Robert Lottermoser, Anne Panther, Martin Matip
