= 2018 Basketball Champions League Final Four =

- Season: 2017–18 season

Tournament details
- Arena: O.A.C.A. Olympic Indoor Hall; Marousi, Athens, Greece
- Dates: 4–6 May 2018

Final positions
- Champions: (Greece) AEK Athens; 1st title
- Runners-up: (France) Monaco
- Third place: (Spain) UCAM Murcia
- Fourth place: (Germany) MHP Riesen Ludwigsburg

Awards and statistics
- MVP: (United States) Mike Green
- Top scorer(s): (United States) Kevin Punter (32)

The 2018 Basketball Champions League (BCL) Final Four was the second Basketball Champions League tournament. It was the concluding phase of the 2017–18 Basketball Champions League season.

== Venue ==
The O.A.C.A. Olympic Indoor Hall hosted the final tournament for the first time.

Athens	2018 Basketball Champions League Final Four (Europe)
O.A.C.A. Olympic Indoor Hall	2018 Basketball Champions League Final Four (Europe)
Capacity: 18,989	2018 Basketball Champions League Final Four (Europe)

== Teams ==
=== Road to the Final Four ===
Club	Clinched Final Four	Season performance								
Club	Clinched Final Four	Regular season record	Round of 16				Quarterfinals			
(France) Monaco	3 April 2018	13–1 (1st Group A)	(Poland) Zielona Góra	174–142	82–84 (A)	90–60 (H)	(Turkey) Banvit	159–152	77–85 (A)	74–75 (H)
(Germany) MHP Riesen Ludwigsburg	4 April 2018	12–2 (2nd Group B)	(Germany) Oldenburg	162–149	63–88 (A)	74–86 (H)	(Germany) medi Bayreuth	170–163	81–86 (H)	77–89 (A)
(Greece) AEK Athens	4 April 2018	8–6 (3rd Group C)	(Czech Republic) ČEZ Nymburk	181–180	88–98 (H)	82–93 (A)	(France) SIG Strasbourg	156–151	78–69 (H)	83–83 (A)
(Spain) UCAM Murcia	4 April 2018	7–7 (4th Group A)	(Spain) Iberostar Tenerife	149–143	66–71 (H)	72–83 (A)	(Turkey) Pınar Karşıyaka	160–137	65–79 (A)	81–72 (H)

== Background ==
=== MHP Riesen Ludwigsburg ===
Ludwigsburg qualified for its first ever final phase of a European competition, as in the 2016–17 season they were eliminated by Banvit on a buzzer-beater. In the Basketball Bundesliga (BBL), Riesen was having a solid year as it was battling for playoff position. In the BCL play-offs, Riesen eliminated two German sides, EWE Baskets Oldenburg and medi Bayreuth in order to advance to the final four.

=== Monaco ===
Monaco was at the top of the standings in its domestic Pro A season. In February, Monaco won the Leaders Cup for its third consecutive time. In the previous season, the team also qualified for the Final Four but was eliminated in the semi-finals, by runners-up Banvit.

=== AEK Athens ===
AEK was having a successful season as well, as the team captured its fourth Greek Cup title, while beating EuroLeague teams Olympiacos and Panathinaikos on the way. AEK had a remarkable path to the final four, as it was nearly eliminated in the round of 16 but was saved by a three-pointer by Kevin Punter to defeat Czech side ČEZ Nymburk. In the quarter-finals, AEK eliminated French side SIG Strasbourg.

Guard Manny Harris was named the Basketball Champions League MVP as well.

=== UCAM Murcia ===
In its first BCL season, and just its second year ever playing in European competitions, Murcia eliminated the defending champions Iberostar Tenerife in the round of 16. In the quarter-finals, Pınar Karşıyaka was defeated. In the 2017–18 ACB season, Murcia was close to qualifying to the playoffs.

== Bracket ==
Semifinals
4 May
(Germany) MHP Riesen Ludwigsburg	65
(France) Monaco	87
4 May
(Greece) AEK Athens	77
(Spain) UCAM Murcia	75

Final
6 May
(France) Monaco	94
(Greece) AEK Athens	100
Third place game
6 May
(Germany) MHP Riesen Ludwigsburg	74
(Spain) UCAM Murcia	85

== Semifinals ==
=== MHP Riesen Ludwigsburg vs Monaco ===
4 May 2018	MHP Riesen Ludwigsburg (Germany)	65–87	(France) Monaco	Athens, Greece
17:30 (UTC+3)	Scoring by quarter: 20–11, 18–25, 16–25, 9–26
	Pts: Johnson 12; Rebs: Evans 7 Asts: Johnson, Walkup 2 Eff: Walkup 14	Boxscore	Pts: Kikanović 19; Rebs: Evans 8 Asts: Cooper 9 Eff: Evans 24	Arena: O.A.C.A. Olympic Indoor Hall; Attendance: 5,862; Referees: Aleksandar Glišić (SRB), Tomas Jasevičius (LTU), Manuel Mazzoni (ITA)

Starters:			Pts	Reb	Ast
PG	3	(United States) Kerron Johnson	12	2	2
SG	4	(Germany) David McCray	0	2	1
SF	0	(United States) Thomas Walkup	10	5	2
PF	23	(United States) Elgin Cook	10	4	1
C	19	(Germany) Adam Waleskowski	6	3	1
Reserves:					
PF	1	(United States) Dwyane Evans	9	7	1
PG	7	(Germany) Niklas Geske	0	0	1
SG	10	(Canada) Adika Peter-McNeilly	11	0	0
SG	11	(Germany) Malik Müller	0	2	0
SF	12	(Germany) Florian Koch	0	0	0
PF	17	(Germany) Mateo Seric	2	1	0
PF	42	(United States) Jacob Wiley	5	3	0
Head coach:
(USA Basketball) John Patrick

Riesen	Monaco

Riesen	Statistics	Monaco
19/38 (50%)	2-pt field goals	23/34 (67.7%)
4/17 (23.5%)	3-pt field goals	9/28 (32.1%)
15/23 (65.2%)	Free throws	14/23 (60.9%)
13	Offensive rebounds	13
21	Defensive rebounds	22
34	Total rebounds	35
9	Assists	27
16	Turnovers	9
7	Steals	11
1	Blocks	2
16	Fouls	21

Starters:			Pts	Reb	Ast
PG	2	(United States) D. J. Cooper	2	1	9
SG	22	(United States) Gerald Robinson	16	3	1
SF	8	(Ukraine) Sergiy Gladyr	12	0	0
PF	5	(France) Amara Sy	10	2	4
C	9	(Bosnia and Herzegovina) Elmedin Kikanović	19	7	1
Reserves:					
PG	4	(United States) Aaron Craft	7	3	3
SF	6	(France) Paul Lacombe	2	4	5
PF	7	(Croatia) Damjan Rudež	0	1	0
SF	10	(France) Romain Poinas	0	0	0
PF	14	(France) Georgi Joseph	2	3	1
PF	23	(United States) Christopher Evans	17	8	3
C	24	(France) Ali Traoré	0	0	0
Head coach:
(Basketball Federation of Montenegro) Zvezdan Mitrović

=== AEK Athens vs UCAM Murcia ===
4 May 2018	AEK Athens (Greece)	77–75	(Spain) UCAM Murcia	Athens, Greece
20:30 (UTC+3)	Scoring by quarter: 18–17, 22–17, 15–20, 22–21
	Pts: Harris 20; Rebs: Hunter 6 Asts: Xanthopoulos 7 Eff: Harris 20	Boxscore	Pts: Benite 19; Rebs: Rojas 12; Asts: Hannah 6 Eff: Rojas 19	Arena: O.A.C.A. Olympic Indoor Hall; Attendance: 16,191; Referees: Srđan Dožai (CRO), Tolga Sahin (ITA), Marius Ciulin (ROU)

Starters:			Pts	Reb	Ast
PG	2	(United States) Mike Green	7	3	3
SG	12	(Greece) Giannoulis Larentzakis	3	1	1
SF	3	(United States) Manny Harris	20	2	1
PF	1	(United States) Delroy James	6	0	1
C	32	(United States) Vince Hunter	0	6	0
Reserves:					
SG	0	(United States) Kevin Punter	16	3	0
PG	4	(Greece) Vassilis Xanthopoulos	0	2	7
PF	5	(Greece) Dušan Šakota	15	4	2
SF	8	(Greece) Panagiotis Vasilopoulos	1	3	0
SF	9	(Bosnia and Herzegovina) Edin Atić	DNP		
C	22	(Greece) Dimitrios Mavroeidis	9	5	0
C	24	(Greece) Vassilis Kavvadas	0	0	0
Head coach:
(Basketball Federation of Serbia) Dragan Šakota

AEK	Murcia

AEK	Statistics	Murcia
17/31 (54.8%)	2-pt field goals	19/43 (44.1%)
8/22 (36.4%)	3-pt field goals	6/20 (30%)
19/31 (61.3%)	Free throws	19/25 (76%)
6	Offensive rebounds	15
26	Defensive rebounds	29
32	Total rebounds	44
15	Assists	14
14	Turnovers	15
9	Steals	10
6	Blocks	3
25	Fouls	28

Starters:			Pts	Reb	Ast
PG	11	(United States) Clevin Hannah	17	4	6
SG	12	(Spain) Brad Oleson	10	0	2
SF	27	(Dominican Republic) Sadiel Rojas	8	12	3
PF	0	(United Kingdom) Ovie Soko	12	8	2
C	24	(Belgium) Kevin Tumba	5	6	0
Reserves:					
SF	1	(Bosnia and Herzegovina) Lazar Mutić	DNP		
SG	3	(Spain) Álex Urtasun	0	0	0
PF	6	(Spain) José Ángel Antelo	0	2	0
SG	8	(Brazil) Vítor Benite	19	1	1
PG	9	(Netherlands) Charlon Kloof	0	0	0
PF	13	(Brazil) Vítor Faverani	DNP		
C	23	(Brazil) Augusto Lima	4	6	0
Head coach:
(Spanish Basketball Federation) Ibon Navarro

== Third place game ==
6 May 2018	MHP Riesen Ludwigsburg (Germany)	74–85	(Spain) UCAM Murcia	Athens, Greece
16:30 (UTC+3)	Scoring by quarter: 17–18, 15–24, 21–18, 21–25
	Pts: Johnson 17; Rebs: Evans 5 Asts: Johnson 9 PIR: Eff: Johnson 27	Boxscore	Pts: Rojas 18; Rebs: Soko 10; Asts: Urtasun 4 PIR: Eff: Rojas 21	Arena: O.A.C.A. Olympic Indoor Hall; Attendance: 8,221; Referees: Manuel Mazzoni (ITA), Petar Obradović (BIH), Marius Ciulin (ROU)

Starters:			Pts	Reb	Ast
PG	3	(United States) Kerron Johnson	17	3	9
SG	4	(Germany) David McCray	2	0	0
SF	0	(United States) Thomas Walkup	7	4	2
PF	23	(United States) Elgin Cook	11	0	2
C	19	(Germany) Adam Waleskowski	10	4	3
Reserves:					
PF	1	(United States) Dwyane Evans	6	5	1
PG	7	(Germany) Niklas Geske	0	0	1
SG	10	(Canada) Adika Peter-McNeilly	11	4	2
SG	11	(Germany) Malik Müller	6	3	0
SF	12	(Germany) Florian Koch	4	1	0
PF	17	(Germany) Mateo Seric	DNP		
PF	42	(United States) Jacob Wiley	0	0	1
Head coach:
(USA Basketball) John Patrick

Riesen	Murcia

Riesen	Statistics	Murcia
20/39 (51.3%)	2-pt field goals	18/37 (48.6%)
7/22 (31.8%)	3-pt field goals	9/24 (37.5%)
13/18 (72.2%)	Free throws	22.31 (71%)
7	Offensive rebounds	17
21	Defensive rebounds	29
28	Total rebounds	46
20	Assists	23
12	Turnovers	17
11	Steals	8
3	Blocks	4
26	Fouls	20

Starters:			Pts	Reb	Ast
PG	11	(United States) Clevin Hannah	10	2	8
SG	12	(Spain) Brad Oleson	3	1	3
SF	27	(Dominican Republic) Sadiel Rojas	18	9	1
PF	0	(United Kingdom) Ovie Soko	15	10	0
C	23	(Brazil) Augusto Lima	8	3	1
Reserves:					
SF	1	(Bosnia and Herzegovina) Lazar Mutić	DNP		
SG	3	(Spain) Álex Urtasun	6	3	4
PF	6	(Spain) José Ángel Antelo	DNP		
SG	8	(Brazil) Vítor Benite	8	1	2
PG	9	(Netherlands) Charlon Kloof	12	3	4
PF	13	(Brazil) Vítor Faverani	DNP		
C	24	(Belgium) Kevin Tumba	5	8	0
Head coach:
(Spanish Basketball Federation) Ibon Navarro

== Final ==
6 May 2018	Monaco (France)	94–100	(Greece) AEK Athens	Athens, Greece
19:30 (UTC+3)	Scoring by quarter: 20–29, 24–24, 26–20, 24–27
	Pts: Gladyr 18; Rebs: Kikanović, Lacombe 6 Asts: Cooper 9 PIR: Eff: Gladyr 22	Boxscore	Pts: Green 19; Rebs: Harris 10; Asts: Xanthopoulos 6 PIR: Eff: James 18	Arena: O.A.C.A. Olympic Indoor Hall; Attendance: 17,984; Referees: Aleksandar Glišić (SRB), Tomas Jasevičius (LTU), Mārtiņš Kozlovskis (LAT)

Starters:			Pts	Reb	Ast
PG	2	(United States) D. J. Cooper	8	1	9
SG	22	(United States) Gerald Robinson	13	2	3
SF	6	(France) Paul Lacombe	2	4	5
PF	5	(France) Amara Sy	8	2	0
C	9	(Bosnia and Herzegovina) Elmedin Kikanović	12	6	0
Reserves:					
PG	4	(United States) Aaron Craft	9	5	4
PF	7	(Croatia) Damjan Rudež	0	0	0
SF	8	(Ukraine) Sergiy Gladyr	18	5	0
SF	10	(France) Romain Poinas	DNP		
PF	14	(France) Georgi Joseph	0	0	0
PF	23	(United States) Christopher Evans	6	4	1
C	24	(France) Ali Traoré	8	2	2
Head coach:
(Basketball Federation of Montenegro) Zvezdan Mitrović

Monaco	AEK

Monaco	Statistics	AEK
24/45 (53.3%)	2-pt field goals	23/45 (51.1%)
7/19 (36.8%)	3-pt field goals	9/17 (52.9%)
25/35 (71.4%)	Free throws	27/40 (67.5%)
13	Offensive rebounds	11
25	Defensive rebounds	23
38	Total rebounds	34
21	Assists	18
13	Turnovers	12
6	Steals	9
7	Blocks	6
30	Fouls	26

2017–18 Basketball Champions League champions

AEK Athens
1st title

Starters:			Pts	Reb	Ast
PG	2	(United States) Mike Green	19	5	3
SG	12	(Greece) Giannoulis Larentzakis	8	0	2
SF	3	(United States) Manny Harris	9	10	4
PF	1	(United States) Delroy James	13	4	1
C	32	(United States) Vince Hunter	10	4	0
Reserves:					
SG	0	(United States) Kevin Punter	16	0	0
PG	4	(Greece) Vassilis Xanthopoulos	2	2	6
PF	5	(Greece) Dušan Šakota	16	2	1
SF	8	(Greece) Panagiotis Vasilopoulos	0	2	1
SF	9	(Bosnia and Herzegovina) Edin Atić	DNP		
C	22	(Greece) Dimitrios Mavroeidis	7	2	0
C	24	(Greece) Vassilis Kavvadas	DNP		
Head coach:
(Basketball Federation of Serbia) Dragan Šakota

- Team captains (C): (France) Amara Sy (Monaco) and (Greece) Dušan Šakota (AEK)
