= 2018 BBL-Pokal =

German basketball competition

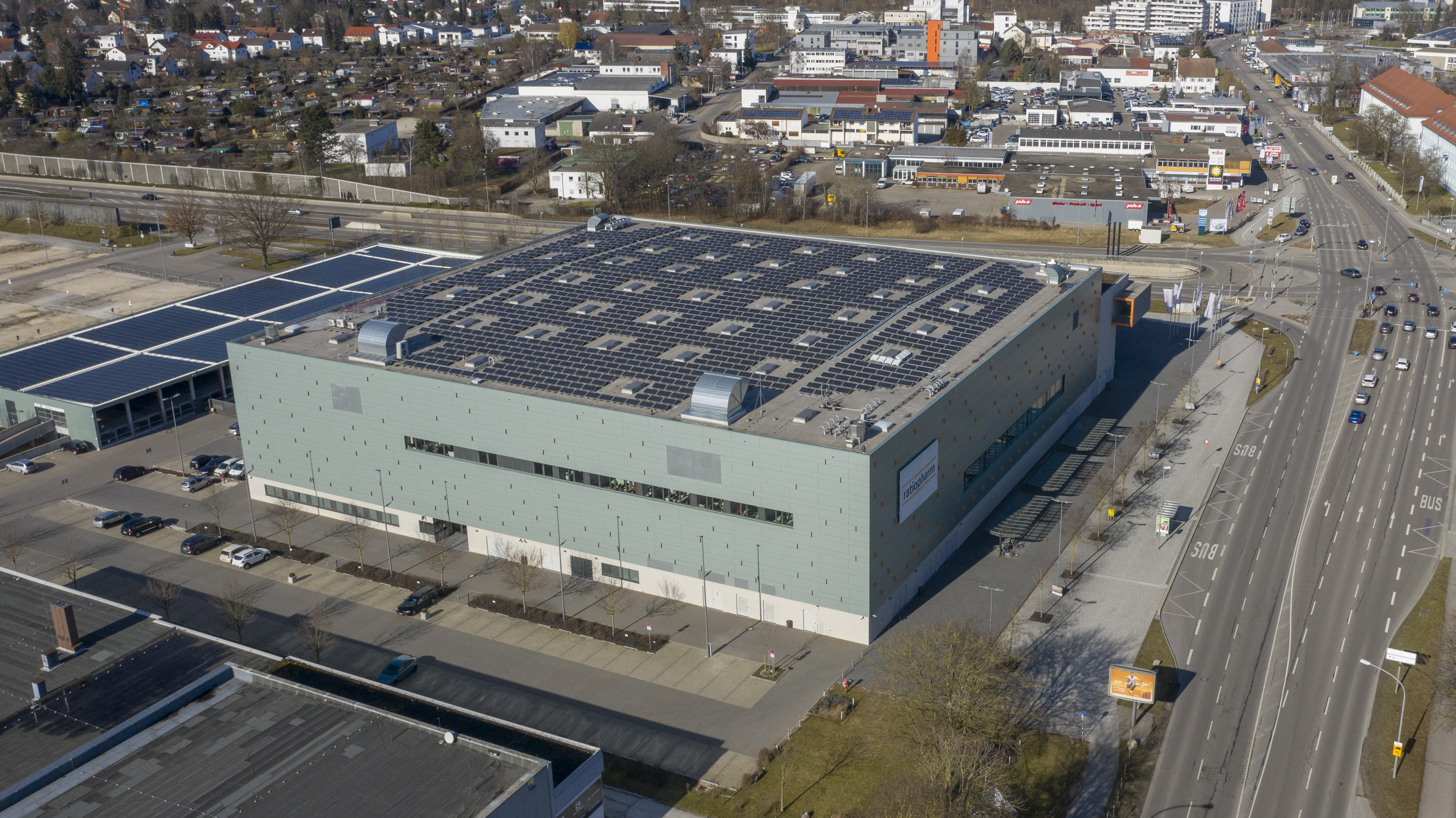
- The Arena Ulm/Neu-Ulm hosted the Top Four
- Season: 2018
- Dates: 20–21 January (qualifiers); 17–18 February (Top Four)
- Games played: 6
- Teams: 7

Finals
- Champions: Bayern Munich (2nd title)
- Runners-up: Alba Berlin
- Third place: ratiopharm Ulm
- Fourth place: Medi Bayreuth

The 2018 BBL-Pokal was the 51st season of the German Basketball Cup, the domestic cup competition of the Basketball Bundesliga (BBL). On 6 June 2017, it was announced that the Top Four would be held at the Arena Ulm/Neu-Ulm in Ulm, which gained ratiopharm Ulm automatic qualification. The other six participating teams were selected through the standings in the 2017–18 Basketball Bundesliga.

== Participants ==
The highest six teams qualified based on their standings in the first half of the 2017–18 Basketball Bundesliga qualify. ratiopharm Ulm qualified directly as the hosts of the tournament.

Pos	Team	Pld	W	L	PF	PA	PD	Pts	Qualification
1	Bayern Munich	16	15	1	1372	1099	+273	30	Seeded in draw
2	Alba Berlin	16	12	4	1358	1175	+183	24	Seeded in draw
3	MHP Riesen Ludwigsburg	16	12	4	1350	1173	+177	24	Seeded in draw
4	Medi Bayreuth	16	11	5	1337	1274	+63	22	Unseeded in draw
5	Brose Bamberg	16	10	6	1313	1180	+133	20	Unseeded in draw
6	Skyliners Frankfurt	16	10	6	1248	1215	+33	20	Unseeded in draw

Source: Easycredit BBL

== Bracket ==
The draw for the qualifying rounds was held on 7 January 2018.

Qualifying round 20–21 January
Bayern Munich (OT)	101
Brose Bamberg	97
Skyliners Frankfurt	74
Medi Bayreuth	96
Alba Berlin	78
MHP Riesen Ludwigsburg	73

Semifinals; 17 February
Bayern Munich	84
ratiopharm Ulm	73
Medi Bayreuth	74
Alba Berlin	96

Final; 18 February
Bayern Munich	80
Alba Berlin	75
Third place
ratiopharm Ulm	81
Medi Bayreuth	79

== Qualifying round ==
20 January 2018
18:00

Boxscore

Skyliners Frankfurt	74–96	Medi Bayreuth
Scoring by quarter: 16–31, 17–29, 22–19, 19–17
Pts: Robertson, Webster 15; Rebs: Mike Morrison 6 Asts: Tai Webster 6		Pts: Gabe York 20; Rebs: Linhart, York 6 Asts: Gabe York 5

Fraport Arena, Frankfurt
Attendance: 4,740
Referees: Anne Panther, Martin Matip, Christof Madinger

21 January 2018
15:00

Boxscore

Alba Berlin	78–73	MHP Riesen Ludwigsburg
Scoring by quarter: 20–28, 15–14, 23–11, 20–20
Pts: Marius Grigonis 21; Rebs: Luke Sikma 7 Asts: Luke Sikma 9		Pts: Adika Peter-McNeilly 21; Rebs: Johannes Thiemann 7 Asts: Thomas Walkup 7

Mercedes-Benz Arena, Berlin
Attendance: 6,105
Referees: Moritz Reiter, Toni Rodriguez, Benjamin Barth

21 January 2018
19:00

Boxscore

Bayern Munich	101–97 (OT)	Brose Bamberg
Scoring by quarter: 25–30, 15–10, 25–21, 21–25, Overtime: 15–11
Pts: Reggie Redding 24; Rebs: Devin Booker 7 Asts: Hobbs, Redding 3		Pts: Daniel Hackett 21; Rebs: Augustine Rubit 7 Asts: Daniel Hackett 4

Audi Dome, Munich
Attendance: 6,523
Referees: Robert Lottermoser, Nesa Kovačević, Clemens Fritz

== Top Four ==
=== Semifinals ===
17 February 2018
16:00

Boxscore

Bayern Munich	84–73	ratiopharm Ulm
Scoring by quarter: 25–22, 16–20, 26–15, 17–16
Pts: Jared Cunningham 22; Rebs: Devin Booker 8 Asts: Reggie Redding 6		Pts: Isaac Fotu 21; Rebs: Benimon, Lewis 6 Asts: Ryan Thompson 3

Arena Ulm/Neu-Ulm, Ulm
Attendance: 6,200
Referees: Toni Rodriguez, Anne Panther, Nesa Kovačević

17 February 2018
19:00

Boxscore

Medi Bayreuth	74–96	Alba Berlin
Scoring by quarter: 22–30, 18–19, 11–28, 23–19
Pts: Robin Amaize 18; Rebs: Linhart, Robinson 5 Asts: James Robinson 5		Pts: Luke Sikma 16; Rebs: Luke Sikma 6 Asts: Peyton Siva 8

Arena Ulm/Neu-Ulm, Ulm
Attendance: 6,200
Referees: Robert Lottermoser, Martin Matip, Moritz Reiter

=== Third place game ===
18 February 2018
12:00

Boxscore

ratiopharm Ulm	81–79	Medi Bayreuth
Scoring by quarter: 15–14, 25–27, 14–19, 27–19
Pts: Ryan Thompson 21; Rebs: Butler, Thompson 6 Asts: Da'Sean Butler 6		Pts: De'Mon Brooks 17; Rebs: Andreas Seiferth 6 Asts: James Robinson 5

Arena Ulm/Neu-Ulm, Ulm
Attendance: 5,500
Referees: Anne Panther, Toni Rodriguez, Nesa Kovačević

=== Final ===
18 February 2018
15:00

Boxscore

Bayern Munich	80–75	Alba Berlin
Scoring by quarter: 19–20, 17–18, 18–21, 26–16
Pts: Jared Cunningham 28; Rebs: Danilo Barthel 6 Asts: Stefan Jović 5		Pts: Luke Sikma 14; Rebs: Marius Grigonis 5 Asts: Peyton Siva 7

Arena Ulm/Neu-Ulm, Ulm
Attendance: 6,200
Referees: Robert Lottermoser, Moritz Reiter, Martin Matip

== See also ==
- 2017–18 Basketball Bundesliga
