= Chris Evans (basketball) =

American basketball player (born 1991)

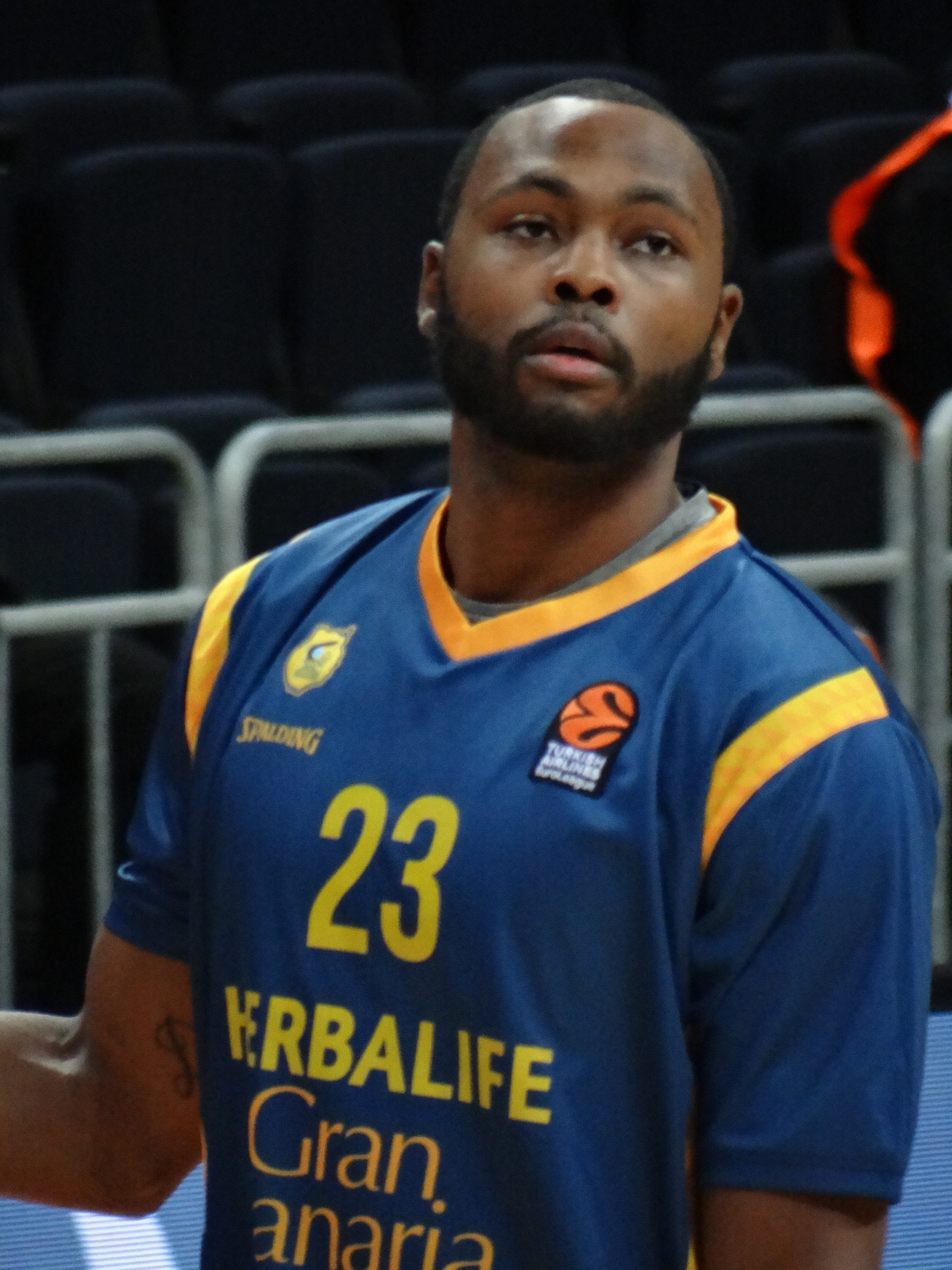
- Evans with Gran Canaria in 2018

Personal information
- Born: January 29, 1991 (age 35) Chesapeake, Virginia
- Listed height: 6 ft 8 in (2.03 m)
- Listed weight: 220 lb (100 kg)

Career information
- High school: Petersburg (Petersburg, Virginia)
- College: Coastal Carolina (2009–2010); Wabash Valley (2010–2011); Kent State (2011–2013)
- NBA draft: 2013: undrafted
- Playing career: 2013–2023
- Position: Power forward

Career history
- 2013–2014: Aries Trikala
- 2014: Pallacanestro Trapani
- 2015: Scafati Basket
- 2015: Hapoel Tel Aviv
- 2016: Ironi Nahariya
- 2016–2017: Canton Charge
- 2017: Gimnasia de Comodoro
- 2017–2018: AS Monaco
- 2018–2019: Gran Canaria
- 2019: Pınar Karşıyaka
- 2019–2020: Orléans Loiret Basket
- 2020: Virtus Roma
- 2021–2022: Shahrdari Gorgan
- 2022: Rapid București
- 2023: Fos Provence Basket

Career highlights
- FIBA BCL Star Lineup Second Best Team (2018); Greek League PIR Leader (2014); Greek League steals leader (2014); French League Cup winner (2018); First-team All-MAC (2013); MAC All-Freshman team (2013)

Christopher Evans (born January 29, 1991) is an American professional basketball player who last played for Fos Provence Basket of the Pro B. Standing at 6 ft 8 in (2.03 m), he plays the power forward position. After playing five years of college basketball at Coastal Carolina, Wabash Valley and Kent State, Evans entered the 2013 NBA draft, but he was not selected in the draft's two rounds.

== High school career ==
Evans played high school basketball at Petersburg in Petersburg, Virginia. Was rated the 17th best junior college player in the country at the start of the season by Rivals.com. At Petersburg High School he was named Second Team All-State and was rated the 73rd-best shooting guard in the country. In the 2008–2009 he averaged 15.3 points, 8.4 rebounds and 2.4 assists per game and helped lead his team to a 30–1 record and a berth in the Group AAA state semifinals.

== College career ==
As a freshman at Coastal Carolina, the Region 24 Player of the Year also took home All-Tournament honors at the NJCAA National Tournament where he averaged 21.7 points over three games. As a sophomore, he averaged 19.5 points, 8.2 rebounds and 2.0 assists per game while leading Wabash Valley to a 29–7 record and a regional title in the 2010–2011 season. On 2011 Evans was transferred to Kent State after playing the previous two seasons for Wabash Valley Community College where he earned first-team NJCAA Division I All-American honors.

== Professional career ==
After going undrafted in the 2013 NBA draft, Evans joined Aries Trikala of the Greek Basket League. With Trikala, he was the second best scorer and the fourth best rebounder of the league. During his rookie season with Trikala, he averaged 16.5 points, 7.3 rebounds and 1.3 assists per game.

The following year, he joined Pallacanestro Trapani. On December he left the team and on January he joined Scafati Basket until the end of the season.

On July 21, 2015, Evans signed with Hapoel Tel Aviv of the Israeli Premier League. On December 7, 2015, he was waived by the team. On January 14, 2016, he joined Ironi Nahariya but he left the team after only two months.

During the 2016–17 season, Evans returned to the United States and joined Canton Charge. He was waived from the team on March 9, 2017, due to a season ending injury. On April 6, 2017, Evans joined Gimnasia de Comodoro of the Liga Nacional de Básquet. On September 8, he returned to Europe and signed with AS Monaco of the LNB Pro A and the Champions League.

On August 2, 2018, Evans signed a one-year deal with Herbalife Gran Canaria of the Liga ACB and the EuroLeague.

On January 10, 2019, Evans signed a 6 months deal with Turkish side Pınar Karşıyaka.

On August 2, 2019, he has signed with Orléans Loiret Basket of the French Pro A.

On August 10, 2020, he signed with Virtus Roma of the Italian Serie A (LBA).

After Virtus Roma's withdrawal from the Serie A due to financial problems, Evans, like all the Roma players, was made free agent.

On October 4, 2021, he has signed with Shahrdari Gorgan of the Iranian Super League.

On August 4, 2022, he has signed with Rapid București of the Liga Națională.

On September 14, 2023, he signed with Fos Provence Basket of the Pro B. On November 24, 2023, Fos Provence Basket and Evans have decided by mutual agreement to end their collaboration.
