= James Robinson (basketball, born 1994) =

American basketball coach and player

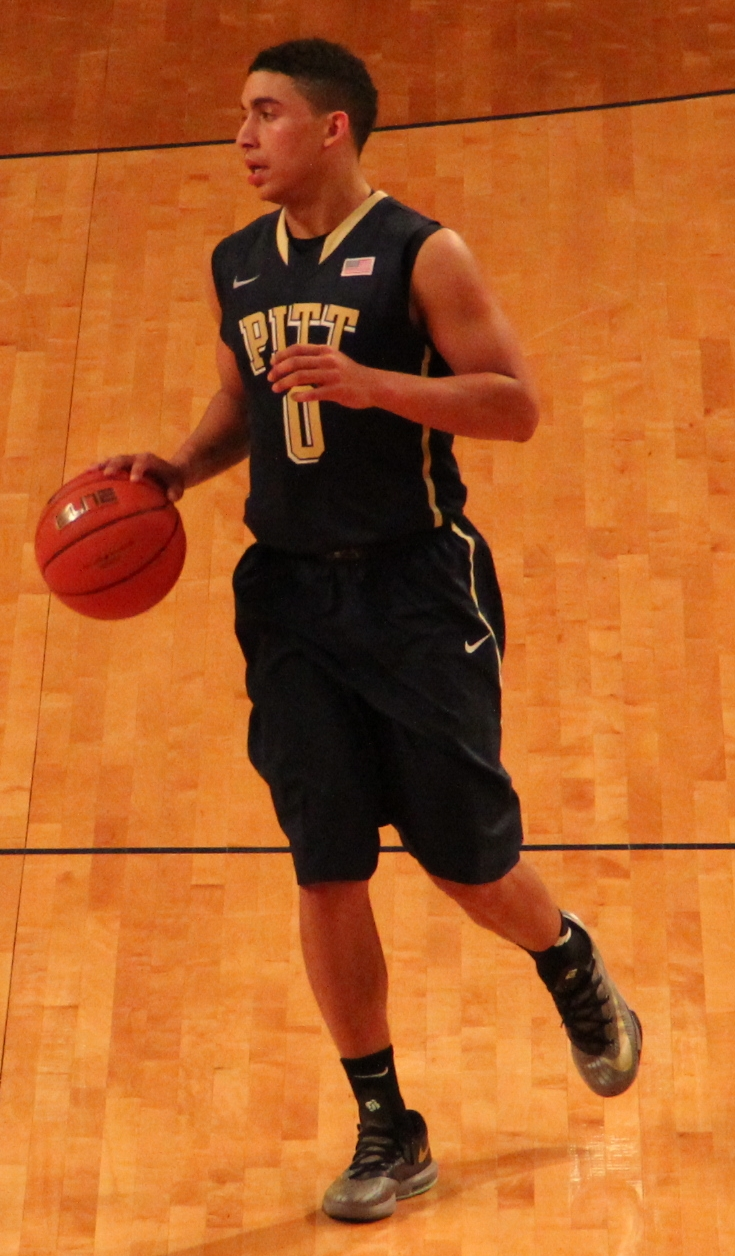
- Robinson with Pittsburgh in January 2014

Old Dominion Monarchs
- Title: Assistant coach
- League: Sun Belt Conference

Personal information
- Born: March 4, 1994 (age 32) Mitchellville, Maryland, U.S.
- Listed height: 6 ft 3 in (1.91 m)
- Listed weight: 200 lb (91 kg)

Career information
- High school: DeMatha Catholic (Hyattsville, Maryland)
- College: Pittsburgh (2012–2016)
- NBA draft: 2016: undrafted
- Playing career: 2016–2022
- Position: Point guard / shooting guard
- Coaching career: 2022–present

Career history

Playing
- 2016–2017: Igokea
- 2017–2018: Medi Bayreuth
- 2018–2019: Bnei Herzliya
- 2019–2020: Medi Bayreuth
- 2020–2021: Löwen Braunschweig
- 2021–2022: Igokea

Coaching
- 2022–2024: Delaware (assistant)
- 2024–present: Old Dominion (assistant)

Career highlights
- 2× Bosnian League champion (2017, 2022); 2× Bosnian Cup winner (2017, 2022)
Medals
Men's basketball
Representing the United States
FIBA World U19 Cup
Gold medal – first place	2013 Czech Republic	Team
FIBA Americas U18 Championship
Gold medal – first place	2012 Brazil	Team

James Arthur Robinson III (born March 4, 1994) is an American basketball coach and former player who is currently an assistant coach at Old Dominion University. He played college basketball for the University of Pittsburgh before playing professionally in Bosnia, Germany and Israel.

== Early life and college career ==
Robinson attended DeMatha Catholic High School in Hyattsville, Maryland, where he won more games (120) than any player in the school's history and lost only one home game. As a senior, Robinson was named First Team All-MET by the Washington Post after averaging 11.2 points, 8.0 rebounds and 6.4 assists per game. He also led DeMatha to a 30–6 overall record, 15-3 WCAC record, No. 1 state ranking and No. 11 national ranking by USA Today.

Robinson played college basketball for the University of Pittsburgh's Panthers, where he averaged 10.2 points, 3.1 rebounds, 5 assists and 1.1 steals per game in his senior year. He finished his college career as the ACC leader in career assist-to-turnover ratio (3.56:1) and among the Pittsburgh all-time leaders in assists (10th - 438) and free throw percentage (fifth - .808).

== Professional career ==
=== Igokea (2016–2017) ===
On August 8, 2016, Robinson started his professional career with the Bosnian team Igokea, signing a one-year deal. Robinson helped Igokea to win the 2017 Bosnian Cup. On May 21, 2017, Robinson recorded 17 points, 4 rebounds and 7 assists in Game 5, leading Igokea to win the 2017 Bosnian League Championship after a 96–72 win over Bosna Royal. In 39 games played for Igokea, he averaged 13.9 points, 3.7 rebounds and 3.7 assists per game.

=== Medi Bayreuth (2017–2018) ===
On June 30, 2017, Robinson signed with the German team Medi Bayreuth for the 2017–18 season. On November 5, 2017, Robinson recorded a season-high 23 points, shooting 8-of-15 from the field, along with 5 rebounds, 5 assists and 2 steals in a 103–99 win over Eisbären Bremerhaven.

Robinson helped Medi Bayreuth reach the 2018 Champions League Quarterfinals, where they eventually lost to Riesen Ludwigsburg. In 58 games played during the 2017–18 season, he averaged 9.7 points, 2.3 rebounds and 3.4 assists per game.

=== Bnei Herzliya (2018–2019) ===
On July 13, 2018, Robinson signed a two-year deal with the Israeli team Bnei Herzliya. On March 25, 2019, Robinson recorded a season-high 23 points, shooting 4-of-7 from three-point range, along with five rebounds in a 95–81 win over Hapoel Gilboa Galil. On April 1, 2019, Robinson suffered a season-ending injury in a match against Ironi Nes Ziona.

=== Return to Medi Bayreuth (2019–2020) ===
On June 21, 2019, Robinson returned to Medi Bayreuth for a second stint, signing a one-year deal. He averaged 10.3 points and 4.5 assists per game in Bundesliga.

=== Löwen Braunschweig (2020–2021) ===
On August 14, 2020, Robinson signed with Basketball Löwen Braunschweig. He averaged 10.9 points, 4.9 assists, and 2.5 rebounds per game.

=== Igokea (2021–2022) ===
On August 10, 2021, Robinson signed with Igokea of the Adriatic League.

== National team career ==
In September 2012, Robinson helped the United States under-18 national team win the 2012 FIBA Americas Under-18 Championship, earning a gold medal. He averaged 4.4 points in 15.6 minutes per game.

In July 2013, Robinson helped the United States under-19 national team win the 2013 FIBA U19 World Championships, earning a gold medal.
