= 2017–18 Basketball Champions League =

- Season: 2017–18
- Dates: 19 September – 2 October 2017 (qualifying); 10 October 2017 – 6 May 2018 (competition proper)
- Teams: 32 (competition proper); 56 (qualifying)

Regular season
- Season MVP: (United States) Manny Harris

Finals
- Champions: (Greece) AEK Athens (1st title)
- Runners-up: (France) Monaco
- Third place: (Spain) UCAM Murcia
- Fourth place: (Germany) MHP Riesen Ludwigsburg
- Final Four MVP: (United States) Mike Green

Statistical leaders
Points	(United States) Kevin Punter	21.1
Rebounds	(United States) D. J. Kennedy	9.0
Assists	(Montenegro) Omar Cook	7.2
Index Rating	(United States) D. J. Kennedy	21.4

Records
- Winning streak: 13 games Monaco
- Highest attendance: 17,984; Monaco 94–100 AEK Athens (6 May 2018)

Seasons
- ← 2016–17 2018–19 →

The 2017–18 Basketball Champions League was the second season of the Basketball Champions League (BCL), a European-wide professional basketball competition for clubs, that was launched by FIBA. The competition began on 19 September 2017, with the qualifying rounds, and concluded on 6 May 2018, including 20 domestic champions.

The Final Four, which was held 4–6 May, was hosted at the Olympic Indoor Hall in Athens, Greece. Hosts AEK Athens won their first Champions League title after defeating Monaco in the final. UCAM Murcia finished in third place while MHP Riesen Ludwigsburg was fourth.

== Format changes ==
For the 2017–18 season, the league went back to the initial format of the 2016–17 season, which includes a regular season of four groups of eight teams, followed by a knock-out stage. 24 teams will be qualified directly, while eight teams will come from the three qualifying rounds that will be implemented. In the Round of 16 and quarterfinals, two-legged series will be played, and the season will be capped off with the Final Four.

=== Eligibility of players ===
FIBA agreed to adopt eligibility rules, forcing the clubs to have at least 5 home-grown players in rosters of 11 or 12 players, or at least four, if the team has got less players.

== Team allocation ==
A total of 56 teams (of which 20 were champions) from 32 countries participated in the 2017–18 Basketball Champions League.

=== Teams ===
The labels in the parentheses show how each team qualified for the place of its starting round (TH: Basketball Champions League title holders; FEC: FIBA Europe Cup title holders):

- 1st, 2nd, 3rd, 4th, 5th, etc.: League position after eventual Playoffs
- RW: Regular season winners
- CW: Cup winners

Regular season
(France) Élan Chalon (1st)	(Italy) Umana Reyer Venezia (1st)	(Germany) EWE Baskets Oldenburg (2nd)	(Israel) Hapoel Holon (RW)
(France) SIG Strasbourg (2nd)	(Italy) Sidigas Scandone (4th)	(Germany) medi Bayreuth (5th)	(Latvia) Ventspils (2nd)
(France) Monaco (RW)	(Italy) Dinamo Sassari (5th)	(Spain) Iberostar Tenerife^{TH} (5th)	(Lithuania) Neptūnas (4th)
(Greece) AEK Athens (3rd)	(Turkey) Beşiktaş Sompo Japan (2nd)	(Spain) UCAM Murcia (9th)	(Poland) Stelmet Enea Zielona Góra (1st)
(Greece) Aris (4th)	(Turkey) Banvit (5th)	(Belgium) Oostende (1st)	(Russia) Enisey (6th)
(Greece) PAOK (5th)	(Turkey) Gaziantep (7th)	(Czech Republic) ČEZ Nymburk (1st)	(Slovenia) Petrol Olimpija (1st)
Third qualifying round
(Belgium) Basic-Fit Brussels (2nd)	(Germany) Telekom Baskets Bonn (7th)	(Lithuania) Juventus (5th)	(Spain) Movistar Estudiantes (11th)
(France) Nanterre 92^{FEC} (CW)	(Italy) SikeliArchivi Capo d'Orlando (8th)	(Poland) Rosa Radom (6th)	(Turkey) Pınar Karşıyaka (9th)
Second qualifying round
(Bulgaria) Lukoil Academic (1st)	(Finland) Kataja (1st)	(Montenegro) Mornar (2nd)	(Russia) Nizhny Novgorod (9th)
(Denmark) Bakken Bears (1st)	(Hungary) Alba Fehérvár (1st)	(Romania) U-BT Cluj-Napoca (1st)	(Ukraine) Budivelnyk (1st)
First qualifying round
(Austria) ece Bulls Kapfenberg (1st)	(Cyprus) Keravnos (1st)	(Kosovo) Sigal Prishtina (1st)	(Portugal) Benfica (1st)
(Belarus) Tsmoki-Minsk (1st)	(Estonia) Kalev/Cramo (1st)	(Lithuania) Vytautas (6th)	(Russia) Avtodor (10th)
(Belgium) Telenet Giants Antwerp (3rd)	(Georgia (country)) Dinamo Tbilisi (1st)	(North Macedonia) Karpoš Sokoli (2nd)	(Spain) Divina Seguros Joventut (14th)
(Bosnia and Herzegovina) Bosna (2nd)	(Germany) MHP Riesen Ludwigsburg (8th)	(Netherlands) Donar (1st)	(Sweden) Luleå (1st)

Notes

1. France (FRA): Monaco are a club based in Monaco (which does not qualify for European competitions), but participated in European competitions through one of the berths for France (any coefficient points they earn count toward France).

== Round and draw dates ==
The schedule of the competition is as follows (all draws are held at the FIBA headquarters in Mies, Switzerland, unless stated otherwise):

Phase	Round	Draw date	First leg	Second leg
Qualifying rounds	First qualifying round	11 July 2017	19 September 2017	21 September 2017
Qualifying rounds	Second qualifying round	11 July 2017	24 September 2017	26 September 2017
Qualifying rounds	Third qualifying round	11 July 2017	29 September 2017	2 October 2017
Regular season	Matchday 1	11 July 2017	10–11 October 2017	
Regular season	Matchday 2	11 July 2017	17–18 October 2017	
Regular season	Matchday 3	11 July 2017	24–25 October 2017	
Regular season	Matchday 4	11 July 2017	31 October–1 November 2017	
Regular season	Matchday 5	11 July 2017	7–8 November 2017	
Regular season	Matchday 6	11 July 2017	14–15 November 2017	
Regular season	Matchday 7	11 July 2017	5–6 December 2017	
Regular season	Matchday 8	11 July 2017	12–13 December 2017	
Regular season	Matchday 9	11 July 2017	19–20 December 2017	
Regular season	Matchday 10	11 July 2017	9–10 January 2018	
Regular season	Matchday 11	11 July 2017	16–17 January 2018	
Regular season	Matchday 12	11 July 2017	23–24 January 2018	
Regular season	Matchday 13	11 July 2017	30–31 January 2018	
Regular season	Matchday 14	11 July 2017	6–7 February 2018	
Play-offs	Round of 16	14 February 2018	6–7 March 2018	13–14 March 2018
Play-offs	Quarter-finals	14 February 2018	27–28 March 2018	3–4 April 2018
Final Four	Semi-finals	12 April 2018	4 May 2018	
Final Four	Final	12 April 2018	6 May 2018	

== Qualifying rounds ==
The draw for the qualifying rounds was held on 11 July 2017, at the FIBA headquarters in Mies, Switzerland.

In the qualifying rounds, teams are divided into seeded and unseeded teams, based on their club coefficients, and then drawn into two-legged home-and-away ties. Teams from the same country cannot be drawn against each other. However, 19 of 24 losing teams enter the 2017–18 FIBA Europe Cup regular season.

=== First qualifying round ===
A total of 16 teams played in the first qualifying round. The first legs were played on 19 September, and the second legs were played on 21 September 2017.

Team 1	Agg.	Team 2	1st leg	2nd leg
Dinamo Tbilisi (Georgia (country))	126–158	(Spain) Divina Seguros Joventut	60–72	66–86
Keravnos (Cyprus)	139–146	(Russia) Avtodor	72–83	67–63
Bosna (Bosnia and Herzegovina)	118–187	(Germany) MHP Riesen Ludwigsburg	59–85	59–102
Karpoš Sokoli (North Macedonia)	160–165	(Estonia) Kalev/Cramo	79–87	81–78
Donar (Netherlands)	159–138	(Lithuania) Vytautas	75–77	84–61
Sigal Prishtina (Kosovo)	124–146	(Belarus) Tsmoki-Minsk	50–57	74–89
ece Bulls Kapfenberg (Austria)	134–142	(Portugal) Benfica	72–75	62–67
Luleå (Sweden)	153–164	(Belgium) Telenet Giants Antwerp	79–81	74–83

=== Second qualifying round ===
A total of 16 teams played in the second qualifying round: eight teams which enter in this round, and the eight winners of the first qualifying round. The first legs were played on 24 September, and the second legs were played on 26 September 2017.

Team 1	Agg.	Team 2	1st leg	2nd leg
Kalev/Cramo (Estonia)	142–150	(Hungary) Alba Fehérvár	78–71	64–79
Divina Seguros Joventut (Spain)	146–150	(Finland) Kataja	75–79	71–71
Telenet Giants Antwerp (Belgium)	156–149	(Russia) Nizhny Novgorod	90–87	66–62
Avtodor (Russia)	158–132	(Montenegro) Mornar	88–70	70–62
Benfica (Portugal)	153–178	(Bulgaria) Lukoil Academic	82–91	71–87
MHP Riesen Ludwigsburg (Germany)	166–149	(Romania) U-BT Cluj-Napoca	78–72	88–77
Donar (Netherlands)	169–163	(Denmark) Bakken Bears	78–80	91–83
Tsmoki-Minsk (Belarus)	129–117	(Ukraine) Budivelnyk	69–64	60–53

=== Third qualifying round ===
A total of 16 teams played in the third qualifying round: Eight teams which enter in this round, and the eight winners of the second qualifying round. The first legs was played on 29 September, and the second legs were played on 2 October 2017.

Team 1	Agg.	Team 2	1st leg	2nd leg
Tsmoki-Minsk (Belarus)	143–148	(France) Nanterre 92	68–68	75–80
Telenet Giants Antwerp (Belgium)	145–152	(Poland) Rosa Radom	75–69	70–83
Avtodor (Russia)	129–161	(Italy) SikeliArchivi Capo d'Orlando	70–69	59–92
Lukoil Academic (Bulgaria)	160–168	(Lithuania) Juventus	81–82	79–86
Kataja (Finland)	151–175	(Germany) Telekom Baskets Bonn	70–90	81–85
Donar (Netherlands)	145–153	(Spain) Movistar Estudiantes	76–76	69–77
Alba Fehérvár (Hungary)	164–171	(Turkey) Pınar Karşıyaka	92–90	72–81
MHP Riesen Ludwigsburg (Germany)	160–109	(Belgium) Basic-Fit Brussels	85–59	75–50

== Regular season ==
Location of teams of the 2017–18 Basketball Champions League regular season.
Red: Group A; Green: Group B; Blue: Group C; Yellow: Group D.

The draw for the regular season was held on 11 July 2017, at the FIBA headquarters in Mies, Switzerland.

The 32 teams are drawn into four groups of eight, with the restriction that teams from the same country cannot be drawn against each other. In each group, teams play against each other home-and-away, in a round-robin format. The group winners, runners-up, third-placed teams and fourth-placed teams, advance to the round of 16, while the fifth-placed teams and sixth-placed teams enter the 2017–18 FIBA Europe Cup round of 16.

A total of 32 teams play in the regular season: 24 teams which enter in this stage, and the 8 winners of the third qualifying round. The match-days will be on 10–11 October, 17–18 October, 24–25 October, 31 October–1 November, 7–8 November, 14–15 November, 5–6 December, 12–13 December, 19–20 December 2016, 9–10 January, 16–17 January, 23–24 January, 30–31 January and 6–7 February 2017.

=== Group A ===
Pos	Team	Pld	W	L	PF	PA	PD	Pts	Qualification	MON	KSK	EWE	MUR	SAS	JUV	HOL	ENI
1	(France) Monaco	14	13	1	1191	952	+239	27	Advance to round of 16	—	79–65	88–73	83–75	87–55	90–53	94–64	89–73
2	(Turkey) Pınar Karşıyaka	14	10	4	1192	1160	+32	24	Advance to round of 16	84–77	—	85–86	79–72	70–79	90–78	98–91	97–81
3	(Germany) EWE Baskets Oldenburg	14	9	5	1192	1142	+50	23	Advance to round of 16	78–84	96–82	—	100–80	90–72	102–95	87–86	86–89
4	(Spain) UCAM Murcia	14	7	7	1096	1105	−9	21	Advance to round of 16	63–68	91–96	85–65	—	78–83	56–70	78–76	82–77
5	(Italy) Dinamo Sassari	14	7	7	1158	1174	−16	21	Transfer to FIBA Europe Cup	63–81	87–88	76–83	88–94	—	93–78	98–84	101–94
6	(Lithuania) Juventus	14	4	10	1105	1193	−88	18	Transfer to FIBA Europe Cup	85–92	76–82	73–77	83–93	90–85	—	71–69	81–73
7	(Israel) Hapoel Holon	14	3	11	1160	1244	−84	17		56–85	93–95	94–90		92–103	106–91	—	81–75
8	(Russia) Enisey	14	3	11	1064	1188	−124	17		65–94	74–81	53–79	62–68	65–75	85–81	98–93	—

Source: Basketball Champions League
Legend: Blue = home team win; Red = away team win.

=== Group B ===
Pos	Team	Pld	W	L	PF	PA	PD	Pts	Qualification	TFE	LUD	PAOK	NEP	VEN	CHA	GAZ	ORL
1	(Spain) Iberostar Tenerife	14	12	2	1155	921	+234	26	Advance to round of 16	—	82–72	93–79	90–67	65–71	82–62	72–53	88–47
2	(Germany) MHP Riesen Ludwigsburg	14	12	2	1139	974	+165	26	Advance to round of 16	62–83	—	103–70	95–83	84–68	94–74	86–74	86–61
3	(Greece) PAOK	14	7	7	1061	1070	−9	21	Advance to round of 16	74–79	63–83	—	91–70	83–76	90–81	82–85	79–61
4	(Lithuania) Neptūnas	14	7	7	1164	1116	+48	21	Advance to round of 16	67–83	71–87	82–69	—	87–80	75–73	114–73	99–62
5	(Latvia) Ventspils	14	6	8	1034	1085	−51	20	Transfer to FIBA Europe Cup	73–72	61–73	59–80	69–84	—	78–77	91–103	55–66
6	(France) Élan Chalon	14	6	8	1018	1031	−13	20	Transfer to FIBA Europe Cup	61–73	56–70	75–61	86–81	69–75	—	85–60	67–55
7	(Turkey) Gaziantep	14	4	10	1033	1192	−159	18		74–87	67–72	65–77	98–94	74–99	68–73	—	82–77
8	(Italy) SikeliArchivi Capo d'Orlando	14	2	12	887	1102	−215	16		59–106	61–72	58–63	60–90	68–79	69–79	83–57	—

Source: Basketball Champions League
Legend: Blue = home team win; Red = away team win.

=== Group C ===
Pos	Team	Pld	W	L	PF	PA	PD	Pts	Qualification	SIG	BAN	AEK	BAY	EST	VEN	OLI	RAD
1	(France) SIG Strasbourg	14	9	5	1103	1055	+48	23	Advance to round of 16	—	87–72	80–78	77–82	77–74	70–67	83–69	98–81
2	(Turkey) Banvit	14	9	5	1080	1039	+41	23	Advance to round of 16	63–80	—	78–71	85–74	82–80	90–62	87–83	74–64
3	(Greece) AEK Athens	14	8	6	1149	1110	+39	22	Advance to round of 16	87–88	70–74	—	83–81	79–87	84–64	91–73	96–92
4	(Germany) medi bayreuth	14	8	6	1145	1115	+30	22	Advance to round of 16	82–80	76–88	80–73	—	84–90	89–81	78–79	90–85
5	(Spain) Movistar Estudiantes	14	8	6	1117	1076	+41	22	Transfer to FIBA Europe Cup	81–65	78–73	78–85	68–76	—	81–80	75–81	78–68
6	(Italy) Umana Reyer Venezia	14	8	6	1146	1140	+6	22	Transfer to FIBA Europe Cup	78–67	108–101	101–103	70–67	92–91	—	84–67	102–93
7	(Slovenia) Petrol Olimpija	14	4	10	996	1105	−109	18		78–77	57–65	71–80	77–90	57–72	66–76	—	80–72
8	(Poland) Rosa Radom	14	2	12	1032	1128	−96	16		63–74	49–48	63–69	79–96	77–84	71–81	75–58	—

Source: Basketball Champions League
Legend: Blue = home team win; Red = away team win.

=== Group D ===
Pos	Team	Pld	W	L	PF	PA	PD	Pts	Qualification	BJK	NYM	NAN	ZGA	AVE	OST	BONN	ARIS
1	(Turkey) Beşiktaş Sompo Japan	14	10	4	1111	1030	+81	24	Advance to round of 16	—	91–80	79–74	65–60	80–86	87–77	95–79	83–61
2	(Czech Republic) ČEZ Nymburk	14	10	4	1152	1100	+52	24	Advance to round of 16	64–70	—	72–81	84–70	81–77	86–72	106–98	99–70
3	(France) Nanterre 92	14	9	5	1149	1091	+58	23	Advance to round of 16	73–68	84–90	—	95–82	89–81	75–74	93–90	91–63
4	(Poland) Stelmet Enea Zielona Góra	14	6	8	1075	1087	−12	20	Advance to round of 16	99–96	82–88	85–82	—	90–79	98–68	73–69	72–80
5	(Italy) Sidigas Scandone	14	6	8	1049	1028	+21	20	Transfer to FIBA Europe Cup	90–74	80–63	102–106	57–64	—	66–57	61–69	79–66
6	(Belgium) Oostende	14	6	8	975	1050	−75	20	Transfer to FIBA Europe Cup	49–77	73–79	73–60	82–78	51–61	—	86–84	69–67
7	(Germany) Telekom Baskets Bonn	14	5	9	1079	1095	−16	19		73–74	87–89	62–84	72–58	79–74	66–74	—	76–59
8	(Greece) Aris	14	4	10	930	1039	−109	18		65–72	65–71	70–62	70–64	59–56	66–70	69–75	—

Source: Basketball Champions League
Legend: Blue = home team win; Red = away team win.

== Playoffs ==
In the playoffs, teams play against each other over two legs on a home-and-away basis, except for the Final Four. In the playoffs draw, the group winners and the runners-up are seeded, and the third-placed teams and the fourth-placed teams are unseeded. The seeded teams are drawn against the unseeded teams, with the seeded teams hosting the second leg. Teams from the same group cannot be drawn against each other.

=== Bracket ===
Round of 16; 6–7 and 13–14 March
(Germany) EWE Oldenburg	63	86	149
(Germany) Riesen Ludwigsburg	88	74	162
(Germany) medi Bayreuth	81	84	165
(Turkey) Beşiktaş	76	84	160
(France) Nanterre 92	66	64	130
(Turkey) Banvit	74	73	147
(Poland) Zielona Góra	82	60	142
(France) Monaco	84	90	174
(Greece) AEK Athens	88	93	181
(Czech Republic) ČEZ Nymburk	98	82	180
(Lithuania) Neptūnas	73	78	151
(France) SIG Strasbourg	68	88	156
(Greece) PAOK	74	67	141
(Turkey) Pınar Karşıyaka	68	79	147
(Spain) UCAM Murcia	66	83	149
(Spain) Iberostar Tenerife	71	72	143

Quarterfinals; 27–28 March and 3–4 April
(Germany) Riesen Ludwigsburg	81	89	170
(Germany) medi Bayreuth	86	77	163
(Turkey) Banvit	77	75	152
(France) Monaco	85	74	159
(Greece) AEK Athens	78	83	161
(France) SIG Strasbourg	69	83	152
(Turkey) Pınar Karşıyaka	65	72	137
(Spain) UCAM Murcia	79	81	160

Semifinals; 4 May
(Germany) MHP Riesen Ludwigsburg	65
(France) Monaco	87
(Greece) AEK Athens	77
(Spain) UCAM Murcia	75

Final; 6 May
(France) Monaco	94
(Greece) AEK Athens	100
Third place game
(Germany) MHP Riesen Ludwigsburg	74
(Spain) UCAM Murcia	85

=== Round of 16 ===
The first legs were played on 6–7 March, and the second legs on 13–14 March 2018.

Team 1	Agg.	Team 2	1st leg	2nd leg
PAOK (Greece)	141–147	(Turkey) Pınar Karşıyaka	74–68	67–79
Nanterre 92 (France)	130–147	(Turkey) Banvit	66–74	64–73
AEK Athens (Greece)	181–180	(Czech Republic) ČEZ Nymburk	88–98	93–82
EWE Baskets Oldenburg (Germany)	149–162	(Germany) MHP Riesen Ludwigsburg	63–88	86–74
Stelmet Enea Zielona Góra (Poland)	142–174	(France) Monaco	82–84	60–90
medi Bayreuth (Germany)	165–160	(Turkey) Beşiktaş Sompo Japan	81–76	84–84
UCAM Murcia (Spain)	149–143	(Spain) Iberostar Tenerife	66–71	83–72
Neptūnas (Lithuania)	151–156	(France) SIG Strasbourg	73–68	78–88

=== Quarterfinals ===
The first legs were played on 27–28 March, and the second legs were played on 3–4 April 2018.

Team 1	Agg.	Team 2	1st leg	2nd leg
Banvit (Turkey)	152–159	(France) Monaco	77–85	75–74
Pınar Karşıyaka (Turkey)	137–160	(Spain) UCAM Murcia	65–79	72–81
AEK Athens (Greece)	161–152	(France) SIG Strasbourg	78–69	83–83
MHP Riesen Ludwigsburg (Germany)	170–163	(Germany) medi Bayreuth	81–86	89–77

== Final Four ==
The concluding Final Four tournament will be played on 4–6 May 2018. The drawing of the pairings took place on 12 April 2018. On 5 April, the O.A.C.A. Olympic Indoor Hall in Athens, Greece was announced as the venue of the 2018 Final Four.

Semifinals
4 May
(Germany) MHP Riesen Ludwigsburg	65
(France) Monaco	87
4 May
(Greece) AEK Athens	77
(Spain) UCAM Murcia	75

Final
6 May
(France) Monaco	94
(Greece) AEK Athens	100
Third place game
6 May
(Germany) MHP Riesen Ludwigsburg	74
(Spain) UCAM Murcia	85

== Awards ==
=== Most Valuable Player ===
Player	Team	Ref.
(United States) Manny Harris	(Greece) AEK Athens	

=== Final Four MVP ===
Player	Team	Ref.
(United States) Mike Green	(Greece) AEK Athens	

=== Star Lineup ===
First team		Second team		Ref.
Players	Teams	Players	Teams	Ref.
(United States) Manny Harris	(Greece) AEK Athens	(United States) Gabe York	(Germany) medi Bayreuth	
(United States) D. J. Kennedy	(Turkey) Pinar Karşıyaka	(United States) Kendrick Ray	(Czech Republic) ČEZ Nymburk	
(United Kingdom) Ovie Soko	(Spain) UCAM Murcia	(United States) Christopher Evans	(France) Monaco	
(France) Louis Labeyrie	(France) SIG Strasbourg	(Greece) Dusan Sakota	(Greece) AEK Athens	
(Bosnia and Herzegovina) Elmedin Kikanović	(France) Monaco	(Slovenia) Gašper Vidmar	(Turkey) Banvit	

=== Best Young Player ===
Player	Team	Ref.
(Lithuania) Arnoldas Kulboka	(Italy) SikeliArchivi Capo d'Orlando	

=== Best Coach ===
Player	Team	Ref.
(United States) John Patrick	(Germany) MHP Riesen Ludwigsburg	

=== Game Day MVP ===
After each gameday a selection of five players with the highest efficiency ratings is made by the Basketball Champions League. Afterwards, the official website decides which player is crowned Game Day MVP.

==== Regular season ====
Gameday	Player	Team	EFF	Ref.
1	(United States) Jarrod Jones	(Turkey) Pınar Karşıyaka	33	
2	(United States) Adam Smith	(France) Élan Chalon	31	
3	(United States) Byron Allen	(Germany) EWE Baskets Oldenburg	26	
4	(United States) Adonis Thomas	(Turkey) Banvit	23	
5	(United States) D. J. Kennedy	(Turkey) Pınar Karşıyaka	35	
6	(Lithuania) Arnas Butkevičius	(Lithuania) Neptūnas	42	
7	(United States) Corey Walden	(Israel) Hapoel Holon	30	
8	(Greece) Lefteris Bochoridis	(Greece) Aris	32	
9	(United States) Jamal Shuler	(France) Nanterre 92	26	
10	(Kosovo) Dardan Berisha	(Czech Republic) ČEZ Nymburk	24	
11	(United Kingdom) Ovie Soko	(Spain) UCAM Murcia	31	
12	(Bulgaria) Dee Bost	(France) SIG Strasbourg	30	
13	(Croatia) Goran Suton	(Spain) Movistar Estudiantes	34	
14	(United States) Manny Harris	(Greece) AEK Athens	31	

==== Round of 16 ====
Player	Team	EFF	Ref.
(United States) Manny Harris (2)	(Greece) AEK Athens	34 / 32	

== See also ==
- 2017–18 EuroLeague
- 2017–18 EuroCup Basketball
- 2017–18 FIBA Europe Cup
