= Oberfrankenhalle =

Multi-purpose indoor sporting arena that is located in Bayreuth, Germany

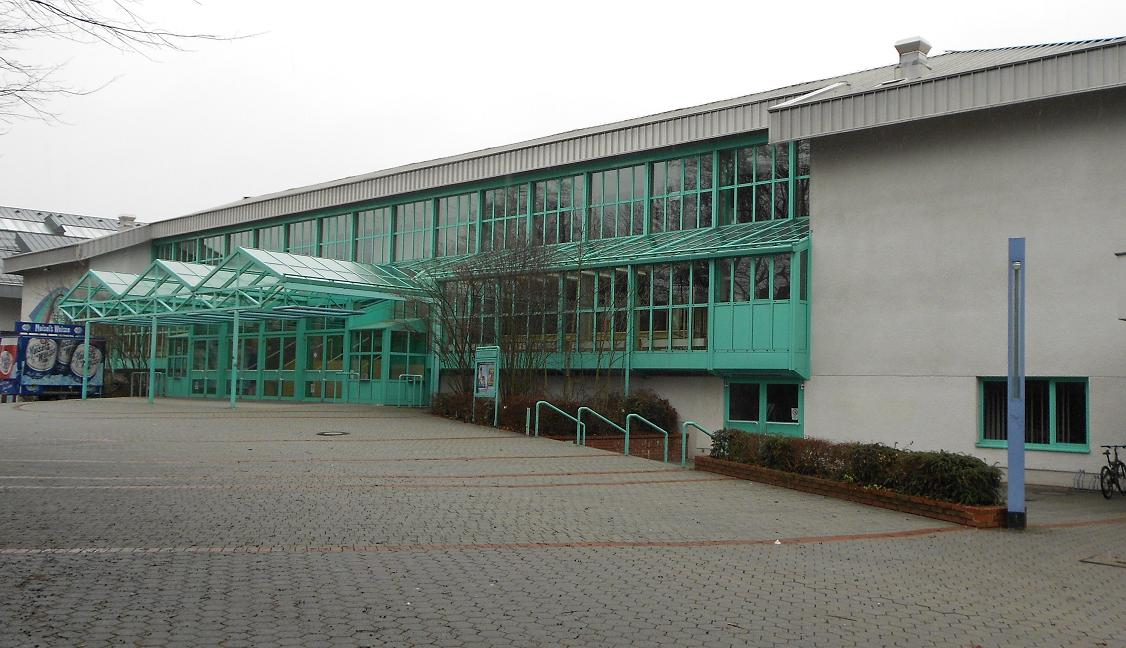
- Interactive map of Oberfrankenhalle
- Location: Bayreuth, Germany
- Coordinates: 49.944591°N 11.585096°E
- Capacity: Basketball: 4,000; Concerts: 3,500 (seated); 6,100 (total); Congresses: 2,000
- Surface: Parquet

Construction
- Opened: 29 October 1988; 37 years ago
- Renovated: 2013

Tenant
- medi Bayreuth (1988–present)

The Oberfrankenhalle is a multi-purpose indoor sporting arena that is located in Bayreuth, Germany. It is a part of the Bayreuth Sports Park, which also includes the Hans-Walter-Wild-Stadion football stadium, an ice rink, and an indoor pool. The arena is mainly used to host basketball, handball, and volleyball games, boxing matches, concerts and congresses. The seating capacity of the arena for basketball games is 4,000.

== History ==
The opening of the hall took place on 29 October 1988. The arena has been used as the regular home arena of the German League basketball club Medi bayreuth.
