= Gerald Robinson (basketball, born 1989) =

American basketball player

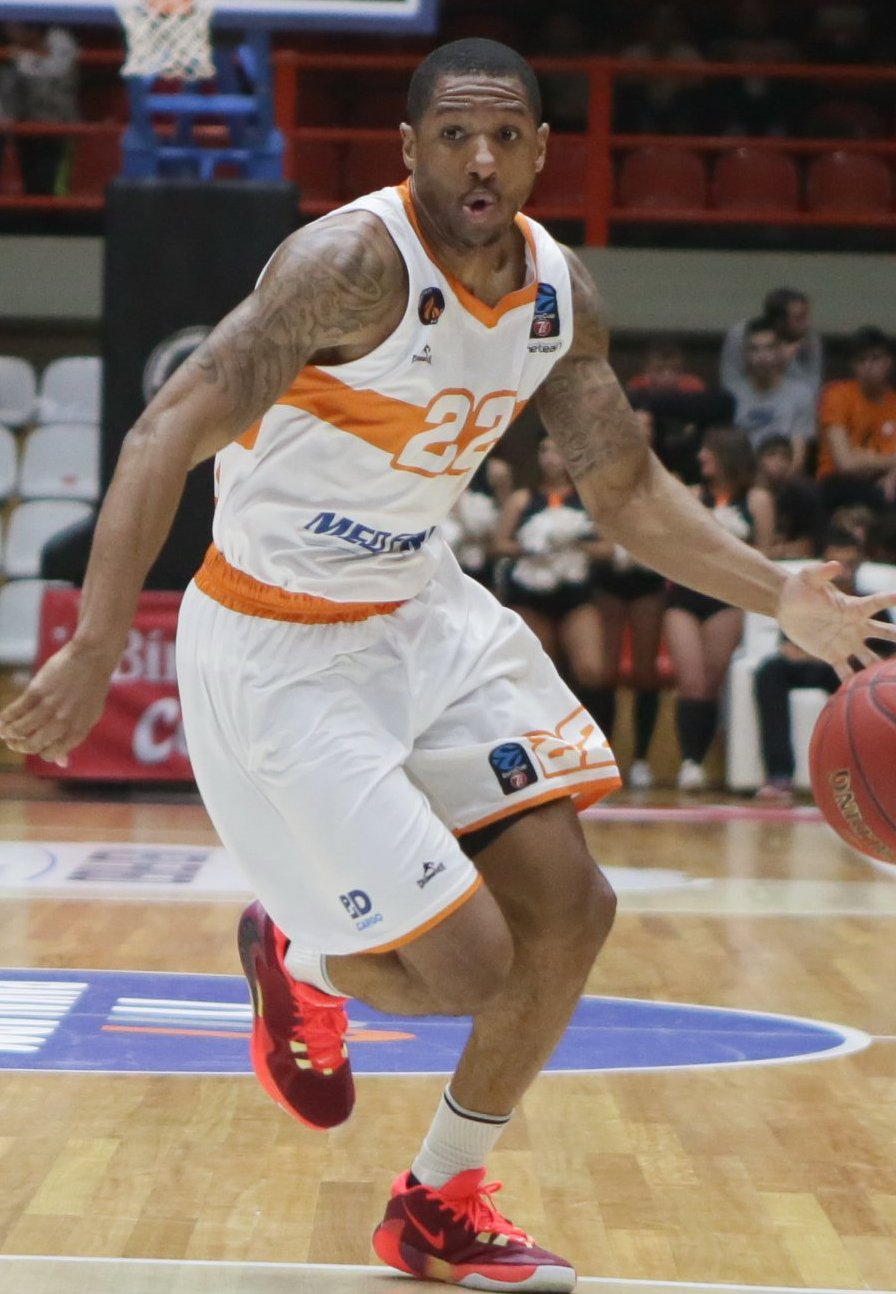
- Robinson with Promitheas Patras in November 2019

No. 22 – Rinascita Basket Rimini
- Position: Point guard / shooting guard
- League: Serie A2

Personal information
- Born: February 10, 1989 (age 37) Nashville, Tennessee, U.S.
- Listed height: 6 ft 1 in (1.85 m)
- Listed weight: 170 lb (77 kg)

Career information
- High school: Martin Luther King (Nashville, Tennessee)
- College: Tennessee State (2007−2009); Georgia (2010−2012)
- NBA draft: 2012: undrafted
- Playing career: 2012–present

Career history
- 2012–2013: Leuven Bears
- 2013–2014: Gilboa Galil
- 2014–2015: VEF Rīga
- 2015–2016: Nanterre
- 2016–2017: Petrochimi Bandar Imam
- 2017: Alba Berlin
- 2017–2019: AS Monaco
- 2019–2020: Promitheas Patras
- 2020: Frutti Extra Bursaspor
- 2020: Virtus Roma
- 2020-2021: V.L. Pesaro
- 2021: JDA Dijon
- 2021: Niners Chemnitz
- 2021–2023: Dinamo Sassari
- 2023–2024: Scafati Basket
- 2024–2026: Rinascita Basket Rimini

Career highlights
- French League Cup winner (2018); Latvian League champion (2015); Italian League steals leader (2022)

Gerald Anthony Robinson Jr. (born February 10, 1989) is an American professional basketball player for Rimini of the Italian Serie A2. Standing at 6 ft 1 in (1.85 m), he plays at the point guard and shooting guard positions. He played college basketball for Tennessee State and Georgia.

== College career ==
Robinson played college basketball at Tennessee State University, with the Tennessee State Tigers. He played at Tennessee State from 2007 to 2009. Robinson then attended the University of Georgia. He played with the school's men's team, the Georgia Bulldogs, from 2010 to 2012.

== Professional career ==
Robinson started his pro career in Belgium with the Leuven Bears.

In July 2013, Robinson joined the Memphis Grizzlies for the 2013 NBA Summer League in Las Vegas. In August 2013, he signed a one-year deal with Gilboa Galil of Israel.

On August 25, 2014, he signed with Latvian powerhouse VEF Rīga.

On July 1, 2015, he signed with French club JSF Nanterre.

On March 30, 2017, Robinson moved to ALBA Berlin of the German Basketball Bundesliga.

On July 6, 2017, Robinson signed with AS Monaco.

On October 24, 2019, Robinson signed with Promitheas Patras.

On January 24, 2020, he has signed with Frutti Extra Bursaspor of the Turkish Super League (BSL).

On August 11, 2020, he has signed with Virtus Roma of the Italian Serie A (LBA).

After Virtus Roma's withdrawal from the Serie A due to financial problems, Robinson, like all the Roma players, was made free agent. On 29 December V.L. Pesaro signed Robinson for a period of seven weeks until February 15 to replace the injured Frantz Massenat.

After the experience in V.L. Pesaro and after playing the Italian Cup final, Robinson moved to JDA Dijon Basket in France, where he signed until the end of the season.

On September 3, 2021, he has signed with Niners Chemnitz of the Basketball Bundesliga. At mid-season, on November 28, Robinson moved to Dinamo Sassari in the Italian Serie A and Basketball Champions League.

In the 2025–26 season, Robinson appeared in 11 Serie A2 games for Rinascita Basket Rimini, averaging 11.3 points, 2.4 rebounds and 3.7 assists per game. On March 24, 2026, Rimini announced that Robinson's contract had been terminated by mutual agreement, ending his two-year spell with the club.
