= Andreas Seiferth =

German basketball player (born 1989)

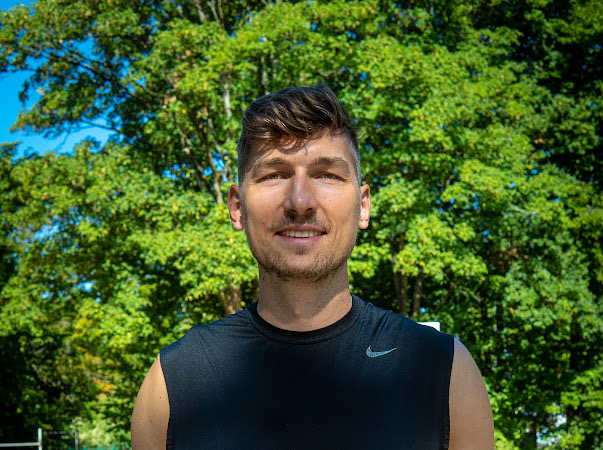

Retired
- Position: Center

Personal information
- Born: 23 June 1989 (age 36) Berlin, Germany
- Listed height: 2.09 m (6 ft 10 in)
- Listed weight: 113 kg (249 lb)

Career information
- Playing career: 2006–2023

Career history
- 2006–2008: TuS Lichterfelde
- 2008–2011: Alba Berlin
- 2010–2011: → Alba Berlin 2
- 2011–2014: TBB Trier
- 2014–2015: Artland Dragons
- 2015–2016: Bayern Munich
- 2016–2022: Medi Bayreuth
- 2022–2023: WWU Baskets Münster

Career highlights
- ProB Youngster of the Year (2011)

Andreas Seiferth (born 23 June 1989) is a German basketball retired player who last played for WWU Baskets Münster of the ProA. Standing at 2.09 m (6 ft 10 in), Seiferth usually played as center.

== Professional career ==
On August 1, 2016, Seiferth signed with Medi Bayreuth of the Basketball Bundesliga (BBL). During the 2019–20 season, he averaged 11.2 points and 3.7 rebounds per game. Seiferth re-signed with the team on July 10, 2020, on a two-year deal.

== International career ==
Since 2012, Seiferth has played for the German national basketball team.

== Personal ==
Andreas' brother, Martin Seiferth, was a professional basketball player as well.
