= Gabe York =

American basketball player (born 1993)

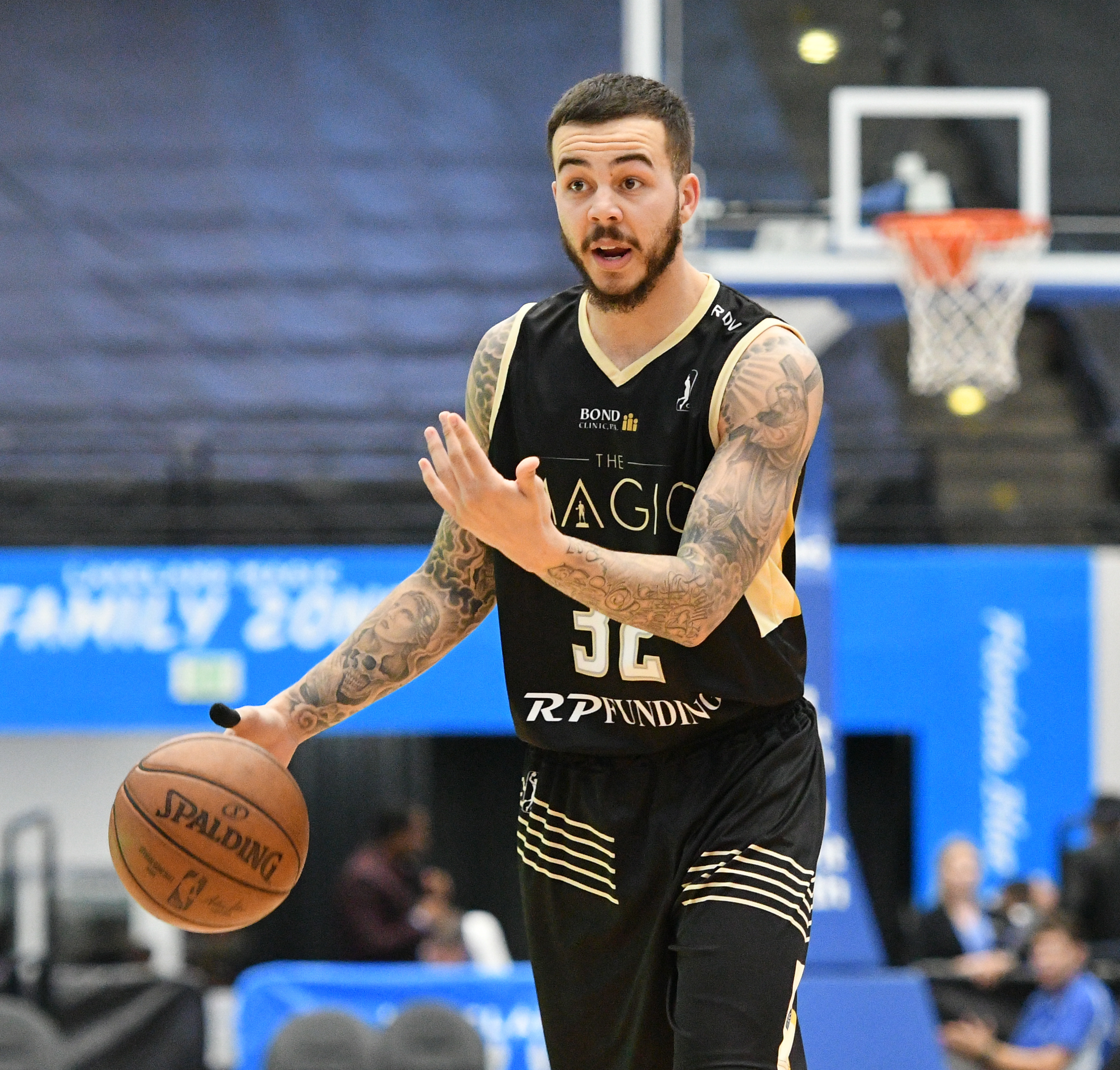

No. 32 – Qingdao Eagles
- Position: Point guard / shooting guard
- League: CBA

Personal information
- Born: August 2, 1993 (age 33) Orange County, California, U.S.
- Listed height: 6 ft 3 in (1.91 m)
- Listed weight: 190 lb (86 kg)

Career information
- High school: Orange Lutheran (Orange, California)
- College: Arizona (2012–2016)
- NBA draft: 2016: undrafted
- Playing career: 2016–present

Career history
- 2016: Vanoli Cremona
- 2016–2017: Erie BayHawks
- 2017–2018: Medi Bayreuth
- 2018–2019: Lakeland Magic
- 2019: AEK Athens
- 2019–2020: SIG Strasbourg
- 2020–2021: Hapoel Tel Aviv
- 2021–2022: Fort Wayne Mad Ants
- 2022: Indiana Pacers
- 2022–2023: Fort Wayne Mad Ants
- 2023: Indiana Pacers
- 2024: NBA G League Ignite
- 2024: Bàsquet Girona
- 2024: Mets de Guaynabo
- 2024–2026: Zhejiang Golden Bulls
- 2025: Atléticos de San Germán
- 2026–present: Qingdao Eagles

Career highlights
- NBA G League Next Up Game (2023); NBA G League steals leader (2022); NBA G League Sportsmanship Award (2019); BCL Star Lineup Second Best Team (2018); Second-team All-Pac-12 (2016)
- Stats at NBA.com
- Stats at Basketball Reference

Gabriel Russell York (born August 2, 1993) is an American professional basketball player for the Qingdao Eagles of the Chinese Basketball Association (CBA). He played college basketball for the Arizona Wildcats, earning second-team all-conference honors in the Pac-12 as a senior in 2015–16.

== High school career ==
York attended Orange Lutheran High School in Orange, California. He averaged 24.9 points, 4.8 rebounds, 2.7 assists, and 2.3 steals per game as a senior where he became the all-time leading scorer of the school. He was rated as the No. 46 overall prospect and No. 11 shooting guard in the class of 2012 by Rivals.com and a scout grade of 93 by ESPN. He signed to Arizona on July 10, 2011.

== College career ==
York played limited minutes his freshman season at Arizona and only appeared in 15 games while backing up future NBA player Nick Johnson. During his sophomore season, York saw his playing time increase as he appeared in all 38 games and helped the Wildcats reach their second Elite Eight appearance. His playing time continued to increase in his junior and senior years.

=== College statistics ===
Year	Team	GP	GS	MPG	FG%	3P%	FT%	RPG	APG	SPG	BPG	PPG
2012–13	Arizona	15	0	5.8	.406	.348	.500	0.3	0.6	0.1	0.0	2.4
2013–14	Arizona	38	12	21.8	.371	.385	.673	2.2	1.6	0.5	0.1	6.7
2014–15	Arizona	37	13	23.1	.440	.400	.811	2.1	1.2	0.6	0.4	9.2
2015–16	Arizona	34	34	33.3	.422	.421	.756	3.2	2.2	0.9	0.3	15.0
Career		124	59	23.4	.414	.402	.750	2.2	1.5	0.6	0.2	9.2

== Professional career ==
=== Guerino Vanoli Basket (2016) ===
After going undrafted in the 2016 NBA draft, York joined the Charlotte Hornets for the 2016 NBA Summer League. On July 22, 2016, York signed with Vanoli Cremona of the Italian Serie A. On November 15, 2016, he parted ways with Cremona after averaging 4.3 points and 2.5 rebounds in 6 games.

=== Erie BayHawks (2016–2017) ===
Six days after leaving Vanoli Cremona, he was acquired by the Erie BayHawks of the NBA Development League. On December 15, York scored 38 points, two rebounds, four assists and four steals in 38 minutes, including 10 triples in a 118–99 Erie win over the Los Angeles D-Fenders.

=== Medi Bayreuth (2017–2018) ===
York joined the Los Angeles Lakers for the 2017 NBA Summer League. On July 31, 2017, York signed with German club Medi Bayreuth. Appearing in 37 games (with 37 starts) of the 2017–18 Basketball Bundesliga season, York averaged a team-high 14.2 points per contest, hitting 93 of his 258 three-pointers.

=== Lakeland Magic (2018–2019) ===
On September 5, 2018, York signed with the Orlando Magic. On September 27, 2018, York was waived by the Magic. On October 23, 2018, York was included in the training camp roster of the Lakeland Magic.

=== AEK Athens (2019) ===
On April 12, 2019, York signed a contract with the Greek Basket League club AEK Athens, which kept him at the club until the end of the 2018-19 Greek Basket League season.

=== Hapoel Tel Aviv (2020–2021) ===
On November 30, 2020, he signed with Hapoel Tel Aviv of the Israeli Premier League. However, he was released on March 18, 2021.

=== Indiana Pacers / Fort Wayne Mad Ants (2021–2023) ===
On October 23, 2021, York was selected third overall in the 2021 NBA G League draft by the Fort Wayne Mad Ants.

On April 7, 2022, York signed a two-way contract with the Indiana Pacers and two days later, he made his NBA debut scoring 7 points and two assists, winning the team's game ball.

On September 16, 2022, York re-signed with the Indiana Pacers, but was waived seven days later. On October 24, he rejoined the Fort Wayne Mad Ants and was named to the G League's inaugural Next Up Game for the 2022–23 season. On March 30, 2023, he signed a two-way contract with the Pacers.

=== NBA G League Ignite (2024) ===
On January 31, 2024, York joined the NBA G League Ignite.

=== Bàsquet Girona (2024) ===
On April 9, 2024, York signed with Bàsquet Girona of the Spanish Liga ACB.

=== Zhejiang Golden Bulls (2024–2026) ===
On August 1, 2024, York signed with Zhejiang Golden Bulls of the Chinese Basketball Association (CBA).

== Career statistics ==
=== NBA ===
Year	Team	GP	GS	MPG	FG%	3P%	FT%	RPG	APG	SPG	BPG	PPG
2021–22	Indiana	2	0	10.5	.286	.167	.600	1.0	2.0	1.0	.5	4.0
2022–23	Indiana	3	0	18.7	.381	.333	1.000	2.0	1.7	.7	.0	8.0
Career		5	0	15.4	.357	.292	.714	1.6	1.8	.8	.2	6.4

=== Basketball Champions League ===
Year	Team	GP	MPG	FG%	3P%	FT%	RPG	APG	SPG	BPG	PPG
2017–18	Bayreuth	18	30.5	.455	.435	.844	4.0	2.4	1.2	0.0	16.9

=== Domestic leagues ===
Season	Team	League	GP	MPG	FG%	3P%	FT%	RPG	APG	SPG	BPG	PPG
2018–19	A.E.K.	GBL	13	24.2	.424	.367	.875	2.1	1.9	1.2	.1	12.9
2020–21	Hapoel Tel Aviv	IPL	12	26.8	.328	.257	.619	2.7	2.4	1.5	.1	9.6
