= Elgin Cook =

American basketball player (born 1993)

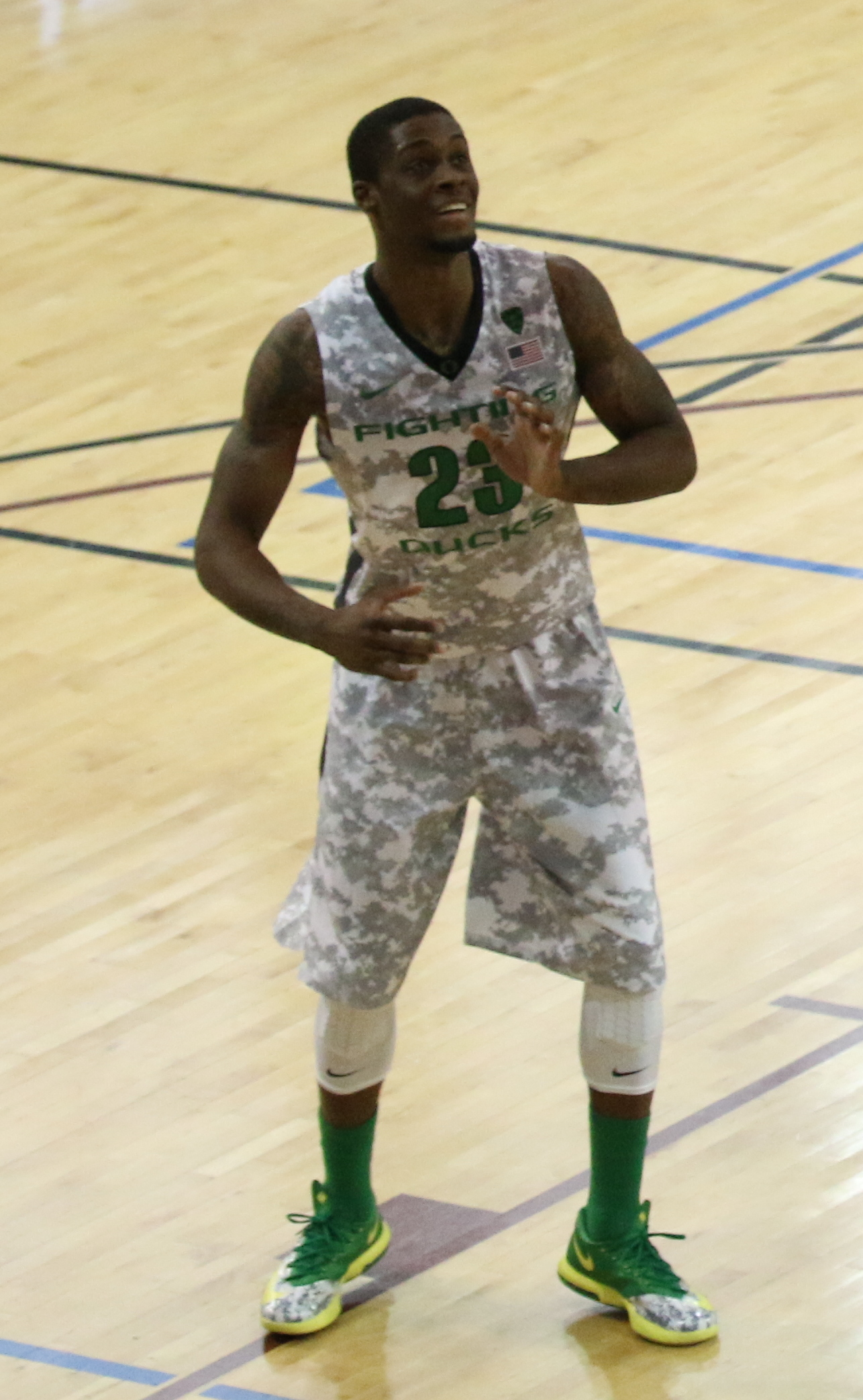
- Cook playing for Oregon

Free agent
- Position: Small forward

Personal information
- Born: January 15, 1993 (age 33) Milwaukee, Wisconsin, U.S.
- Listed height: 6 ft 5 in (1.96 m)
- Listed weight: 210 lb (95 kg)

Career information
- High school: Bay View (Milwaukee, Wisconsin); Hamilton (Milwaukee, Wisconsin)
- College: Northwest Florida (2012–2013); Oregon (2013–2016)
- NBA draft: 2016: undrafted
- Playing career: 2016–present

Career history
- 2016–2017: Santa Cruz Warriors
- 2017–2018: MHP Riesen Ludwigsburg
- 2018–2019: Cedevita Zagreb
- 2019–2020: Avtodor Saratov
- 2020: UNICS Kazan
- 2020–2021: Lokman Hekim Fethiye Belediyespor
- 2021–2022: Tofaş
- 2022–2024: Tenerife
- 2024: Satria Muda Pertamina
- 2024–2025: Fukushima Firebonds

Career highlights
- FIBA Intercontinental Cup champion (2023); Croatian Cup winner (2019); First-team All-Pac 12 (2016); Pac-12 tournament MVP (2016)
- Stats at Basketball Reference

Elgin Rashad Cook (born January 15, 1993) is an American professional basketball player for Fukushima Firebonds of the B.League. The son of former National Basketball Association (NBA) player Alvin Robertson, he played college basketball for Northwest Florida and Oregon.

== College career ==
A 6 ft 6 in (1.98 m) forward from Milwaukee, Wisconsin, Cook began his collegiate career at Northwest Florida State College. He redshirted a year after originally committing to Iowa State men's basketball. As a sophomore, he transferred to Oregon since his father was friends with one of Oregon's assistant coaches. He earned second-team All-Pac-12 honors as a junior. As a senior, Cook averaged 14.8 points and 5.1 rebounds per game and earned first-team All-Pac-12 honors. He was named Pac-12 Tournament MVP after averaging 17.3 points and 5.3 rebounds per game in the tournament. He helped Oregon achieve a 31–7 record and reach the Elite Eight while leading the team in steals with 54. In his three years at Oregon, Cook scored 1,259 points.

== Professional career ==
=== Santa Cruz Warriors (2016–2017) ===
After going undrafted in the 2016 NBA draft, Cook joined the Sacramento Kings for the 2016 NBA Summer League. On September 16, 2016, he signed with the Golden State Warriors. However, he was later waived by the Warriors on October 9 after appearing in two preseason games. On October 31, 2016, he was acquired by the Santa Cruz Warriors of the NBA Development League as an affiliate player of Golden State.

=== MHP Riesen Ludwigsburg (2017–2018) ===
Cook played for the Golden State Warriors in the 2017 NBA Summer League.

On August 10, 2017, Cook signed with MHP Riesen Ludwigsburg of the German Basketball Bundesliga for the 2017–18 season.

=== Cedevita Zagreb (2018–2019) ===
In July 2018 he signed with Cedevita Zagreb of the Croatian League.

=== Avtodor Saratov (2019–2020) ===
On August 20, 2019, he has signed with Avtodor Saratov of the VTB United League. He averaged 15 points and 5 rebounds per game.

=== UNICS Kazan (2020) ===
Cook signed with UNICS Kazan on January 28, 2020. He played one game for the team before the season was suspended. Cook parted ways with the team on June 14.

=== Fethiye Belediyespor (2020–2021) ===
On September 26, 2020, he has signed with Lokman Hekim Fethiye Belediyespor of the Turkish BSL. Cook averaged 15.8 points and 6.5 rebounds per game.

=== Tofaş (2021–2022) ===
On July 2, 2021, Cook signed with Tofaş in Turkey.

=== Tenerife (2022–2024) ===
On July 1, 2022, he has signed with Tenerife of the Spanish Liga ACB.

== The Basketball Tournament ==
Cook played for the Golden Eagles in the 2018 edition of The Basketball Tournament (TBT). In five games, he averaged 14.6 points, .8 steals, and shot a team-leading 61 percent from the field. The Golden Eagles reached the semi-finals before falling to Overseas Elite. Cook was also a member of the Golden Eagles team that won the 2020 tournament.
