= Kerron Johnson =

American basketball player (born 1990)

Kansas State Wildcats
- Position: Assistant coach
- League: Big 12 Conference

Personal information
- Born: December 14, 1990 (age 35) Tallahassee, Florida, U.S.
- Listed height: 6 ft 1 in (1.85 m)
- Listed weight: 176 lb (80 kg)

Career information
- High school: Madison Academy (Madison, Alabama)
- College: Belmont (2009–2013)
- NBA draft: 2013: undrafted
- Playing career: 2013–2022
- Coaching career: 2022–present

Career history

Playing
- 2013–2014: New Zealand Breakers
- 2014–2015: Riesen Ludwigsburg
- 2015: Rouen
- 2016–2017: MKS Dąbrowa Górnicza
- 2017–2018: Riesen Ludwigsburg
- 2018–2019: Pistoia
- 2019: Hapoel Be'er Sheva
- 2019–2020: U-BT Cluj-Napoca
- 2020–2021: BC Enisey
- 2021–2022: S.Oliver Würzburg
- 2022: Spójnia Stargard

Coaching
- 2022–2024: Belmont (GA)
- 2024–2026: Belmont (assistant)
- 2026–present: Kansas State (assistant)

Career highlights
- First-team All-OVC (2013); First-team All-Atlantic Sun (2012); Alabama Mr. Basketball (2009)

Kerron Tyre Johnson Jr. (born December 14, 1990) is an American basketball coach and former player who is currently an assistant coach at Kansas State University. He previously served as an assistant coach at his alma mater, Belmont University. He played professionally in New Zealand, Germany, France, Poland, Italy, and Israel.

== High school career ==
Johnson attended Madison Academy in Madison, Alabama. In his senior year, he averaged 24 points, six assists, five rebounds and two steals per game for the 29–6 Mustangs.

== College career ==
Johnson was part of the Belmont University basketball team from 2009 to 2013. In 2009–10, he averaged 20.1 minutes, 6.1 points, 2.1 rebounds, 2.8 assists and 1.0 steals per game. In 2010–11, he averaged 18.2 minutes, 7.9 points, 1.5 rebounds, 2.7 assists and 2.0 steals per game. In his junior year in 2011–12, he averaged 28.6 minutes, 13.8 points, 3.1 rebounds, 5.2 assists and 1.4 steals per game. In his senior year in 2012–13, he averaged 30.0 minutes, 14.0 points, 3.2 rebounds, 4.8 assists and 1.7 steals per game.

== Professional career ==
On August 12, 2013, Johnson signed a multi-year deal with the New Zealand Breakers of the National Basketball League. On April 3, 2014, he was released by the Breakers following the conclusion of the 2013–14 season. In 28 games for the Breakers, he averaged 12.6 points, 2.8 rebounds, 4.3 assists and 1.2 steals per game.

On September 19, 2014, Johnson signed with MHP Riesen Ludwigsburg of Germany for the 2014–15 season. In 34 games for Ludwigsburg, he averaged 14.2 points, 2.7 rebounds, 3.8 assists and 1.1 steals per game.

On July 24, 2015, Johnson signed with SPO Rouen Basket of France for the 2015–16 season.

On August 1, 2017, Johnson re-signed with MHP Riesen Ludwigsburg for the 2017–18 season.

On July 14, 2018, Johnson signed with the Italian club Pistoia Basket 2000. In 18 games played for Pistoia, he averaged 12.1 points, 3.1 rebounds and 3.7 assists per game.

On February 21, 2019, Johnson parted ways with Pistoia to join Hapoel Be'er Sheva of the Israeli Premier League for the rest of the season. In 16 games played for Be'er Sheva, he averaged 14.3 points, 2.6 rebounds, 4.8 assists and 1.3 steals per game. Johnson helped Be'er Sheva reach the 2019 Israeli League Playoffs, where they eventually were eliminated by Hapoel Jerusalem in the Quarterfinals.

On September 8, 2019, Johnson signed a one-year deal with U-BT Cluj-Napoca of the Romanian Liga Națională. Johnson averaged 12.7 points and 5.1 assists per game in the Romanian league.

On July 23, 2020, he has signed with BC Enisey of the VTB United League.

On October 22, 2021, he has signed with s.Oliver Würzburg of the German Basketball Bundesliga. Johnson averaged 8.2 points, 3.0 assists and 1.2 rebounds per game. On January 13, 2022, he has signed with Spójnia Stargard of the Polish Basketball League (PLK).

== Coaching career ==
Johnson returned to Belmont in 2022 as an assistant coach.

In 2026, Johnson followed head coach Casey Alexander from Belmont to Kansas State University.

== Personal life ==
Johnson is the son of Kerry and Natalie Johnson, and has three siblings, Kalonda, Nyla and Kerryon. Kerryon played college football at Auburn University and played professionally in the NFL.
