= Adika Peter-McNeilly =

Canadian basketball player (born 1993)

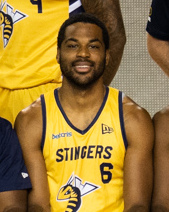
- Peter-McNeilly in 2020.

No. 6 – Edmonton Stingers
- Position: Guard
- League: CEBL

Personal information
- Born: April 17, 1993 (age 33) Toronto, Ontario
- Listed height: 6 ft 3 in (1.91 m)

Career information
- High school: St. Mother Teresa Catholic Academy (Scarborough, Ontario)
- College: Clarendon (2012-2013); Ryerson (2013–2017)
- NBA draft: 2017: undrafted
- Playing career: 2017–2023

Career history
- 2017–2018: Riesen Ludwigsburg
- 2018–2019: Mitteldeutscher BC
- 2020: Edmonton Stingers
- 2020–2021: Lille
- 2021–2023: Edmonton Stingers
- 2021: ABC Athletic Constanța
- 2023–2024: Río Ourense Termal
- 2024: Edmonton Stingers

Career highlights
- 2 CEBL champion (2020, 2021); CIS All-Canada First Team (2017); All-OUA First Team (2016, 2017)

Adika Peter-McNeilly (born April 17, 1993) is a Canadian Former professional basketball player for the Edmonton Stingers of the Canadian Elite Basketball League (CEBL).

== Playing career ==
=== College / University ===
Graduating from St. Mother Teresa Catholic Academy in Scarborough, Ontario, Peter-McNeilly took his game to the United States, where he spent the 2012–13 season at Clarendon College in the state of Texas.

In 2013, he transferred to Ryerson University and became a key contributor for the Rams and coach Roy Rana right away. After 73 career games played for Ryerson, the guard posted career game averages of 14.4 points, 5.2 rebounds, 3.4 assists and 1.6 steals. In four years, Peter-McNeilly shot 40.8 percent from three-point-land (150-of-368). He earned numerous honours at Ryerson, including 2017 All-Canada First Team accolades, CIS Tournament All-Star distinction in 2015, 2016 and 2017, All-OUA First Team recognition in 2016 and 2017 and the R.W. Pugh Fair Play Award in 2014–15. In 2015–16, he was a finalist for the D.H. Craighead Outstanding Contribution to Interuniversity Sport, Campus and Community Life award.

=== Professional career ===
Peter-McNeilly signed a deal with the MHP Riesen Ludwigsburg organization of the German top-flight Bundesliga in July 2017 to get his professional career underway. In July 2018, he was signed by fellow Bundesliga side Mitteldeutscher BC.

He played for the Edmonton Stingers in the 2020 CEBL season, winning the championship. Peter-McNeilly rejoined the team for the 2021 season. On December 27, 2021, he signed with ABC Athletic Constanța of the Romanian Liga Națională. He returned to Edmonton soon to join the team for their maiden campaign in the 2021–22 BCL Americas.

On June 27, 2023, Peter-McNeilly signed with Río Ourense Termal of the LEB Oro.

=== International career ===
He competed for Canada at the 2015 World University Games in Gwangju.
