= Medi Bayreuth =

Professional basketball team in Bayreuth, Germany

medi bayreuth
- League: ProA
- Founded: 1975; 51 years ago
- History: List: Post SV Bayreuth (1975–1979) USC Bayreuth (1979–1983) USC Olympia Bayreuth (1983–1984) BG Steiner Bayreuth (1984–1989) Steiner Bayreuth (1989–1997) Basket Bayreuth (1997–1999) BBC Bayreuth (1999–2013) medi bayreuth (2013–present)
- Arena: Oberfrankenhalle
- Capacity: 3,500
- Location: Bayreuth, Bavaria
- Team colors: Black, Lime, White
- Head coach: Vincent van Sliedrecht
- Team captain: Moritz Plescher
- Championships: 1 German Championship; 2 German Cups
- Website: www.bbc-bayreuth.de
Home	Away	Third

Medi Bayreuth, official stylized as medi bayreuth, is a German professional basketball club that is based in Bayreuth, Germany. It was re-founded as BBC Bayreuth in 1999. The team plays in the ProA, the second-highest division of basketball in Germany. From 2013 until 2023, the company medi was the head and naming sponsor of the team. For the start of the 2023-24 season the club renamed itself BBC Bayreuth again.

== History ==
The club was founded as the basketball section of Post SV Bayreuth in 1975 and was one of the clubs that established the second division of professional basketball in Germany. In its debut season, the team was immediately promoted to the first tier (Basketball Bundesliga). In 1979, the basketball team separated from Post SV, and the club was re-founded as USC Bayreuth. After the 1983–84 season the team was relegated from the Bundesliga. Following this, the club merged with TTBG Steiner-Optik Bayreuth, a former table tennis club, to form BG Steiner Bayreuth.

As Steiner Bayreuth, the team had some great successes. The club immediately returned to the highest level, and years later won several trophies in Germany. In 1988 and 1989 the team won the BBL-Pokal (cup competition) and in the 1988–89 season the team was crowned German national champions after winning the Bundesliga.

In 1997, longtime sponsor Steiner left the club and the club started to get in financial trouble. Along with the financial crisis, the team also had a sportive crisis. In 1999, the team was relegated from the Bundesliga to the second division because of financial troubles. Bayreuth spent the following seasons in the second division ProA.

Bayreuth eventually returned to the highest level. The club won the 2009–10 season's German 2nd Division championship, and thus earned promotion to the Bundesliga for the 2010–11 season. Before the 2013–14 season, the club's name was changed to medi bayreuth for sponsorship reasons. The new team colors were black, lime green and pink.

Bayreuth had an outstanding 2016–17 season, as the team of Raoul Korner finished fourth in the BBL regular season with a 22–10 record. In the play-offs the team was eliminated by fifth-seeded Oldenburg. However, the placement of the club qualified Bayreuth for the 2017–18 Basketball Champions League, which was the first European campaign for the club. With an 8–6 record in the regular season, Bayreuth advanced to the play-offs, in which the team eliminated Turkish side Beşiktaş in the last 16. But in the quarter-finals the club was eliminated by fellow German side Riesen Ludwigsburg.

== Arena ==
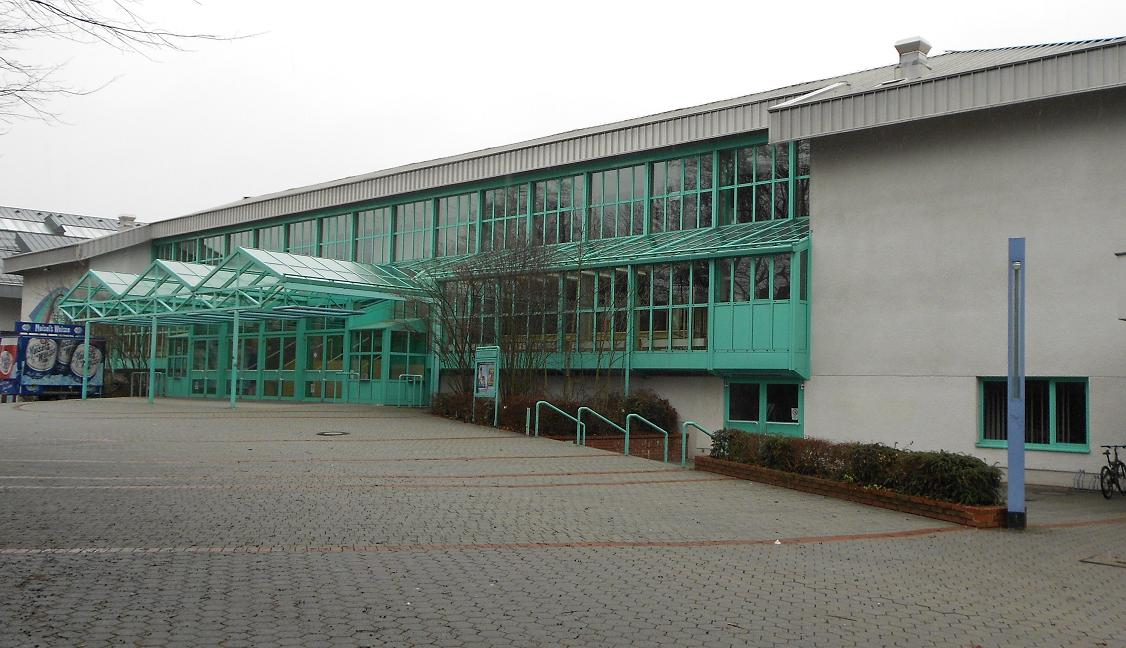
The Oberfrankenhalle, home arena of Bayreuth

The club's regular home arena is the Oberfrankenhalle, which has a seating capacity of 4,000 people.

== Club identity ==
=== Logos ===
BBC Bayreuth
1999–2013

=== Uniforms ===
Steiner Bayreuth (1988–89)	BBC Bayreuth (2012–13)	medi bayreuth (2013– )

== Players ==
=== Current roster ===
Note: Flags indicate national team eligibility at FIBA-sanctioned events. Players may hold other non-FIBA nationalities not displayed.

medi Bayreuth roster
Players
Coaches

Pos.	No.	Nat.	Name	Ht.	Wt.	Age
G	0	(Germany)	Bonga, Joshua	1.90 m (6 ft 3 in)	86 kg (190 lb)	21 – 13 January 2005
G	1	(Germany)	McClain, Nic	1.91 m (6 ft 3 in)	91 kg (201 lb)	24 – 4 December 2001
F/C	2	(United States)	Kelly, Taje'	2.01 m (6 ft 7 in)	108 kg (238 lb)	23 – 3 January 2003
G	3	(United States)	Frierson, Matt	1.88 m (6 ft 2 in)	77 kg (170 lb)	29 – 2 May 1997
SG	6	(Germany)	Plescher, Moritz (C)	1.95 m (6 ft 5 in)	89 kg (196 lb)	26 – 4 October 2000
G	7	(Germany)	Wulff, Luis	1.99 m (6 ft 6 in)	97 kg (214 lb)	22 – 14 March 2004
F	8	(Germany)	Wohlrath, Kevin	1.97 m (6 ft 6 in)	97 kg (214 lb)	31 – 15 February 1995
G	9	(Germany)	Wabersich, Noah	1.92 m (6 ft 4 in)	81 kg (179 lb)	22 – 6 June 2004
F	12	(United States)	Prospere II, Emanuel	1.95 m (6 ft 5 in)	101 kg (223 lb)	25 – 26 July 2001
F	17	(Germany)	Holländer, Liam	1.94 m (6 ft 4 in)	79 kg (174 lb)	18 – 17 June 2008
F	21	(Germany)	Adoyi, Limana	1.95 m (6 ft 5 in)	96 kg (212 lb)	19 – 1 October 2007
C	22	(Germany)	Ikejiaku, Leroy	2.08 m (6 ft 10 in)	100 kg (220 lb)	21 – 29 November 2004
G	23	(United States)	Davis Jr., Darrell	1.96 m (6 ft 5 in)	91 kg (201 lb)	30 – 9 May 1996
G	28	(United States)	Abram Jr., Glen	1.88 m (6 ft 2 in)	88 kg (194 lb)	28 – 28 September 1998
C	45	(Germany)	Metcalf, Collin	2.06 m (6 ft 9 in)	108 kg (238 lb)	23 – 27 June 2003
PF	55	(Germany)	Hildebrandt, Simon	2.06 m (6 ft 9 in)	107 kg (236 lb)	23 – 17 March 2003

Head coach

- (Netherlands) Vincent van Sliedregt

Assistant coach(es)

- (Netherlands) Cyril Weerkamp
- (Germany) Nils Scheller

Legend

- (C) Team captain
- Injured

- Roster
Updated: November 10, 2026

=== Notable players ===
- (United States) Sacar Anim
- (United States) Frank Bartley
- (United States) Brandon Bowman
- (United States) Adonis Thomas
- (Lithuania) Ignas Sargiūnas

== Trophies ==
- German Championship:
  - Champions: 1988–89
- German Cup:
  - Champions: 1987–88, 1988–89
- ProA / 2. Basketball Bundesliga
  - Champions: 1975-76, 1992-93, 2008–09

== Season by season ==
Season	Tier	League	Pos.	German Cup	European competitions	
2000–01	2	2. BBL	8th			
2001–02	2	2. BBL	2nd			
2002–03	2	2. BBL	5th			
2003–04	2	2. BBL	10th			
2004–05	2	2. BBL	3rd			
2005–06	2	2. BBL	6th			
2006–07	2	2. BBL	3rd			
2007–08	2	Pro A	8th			
2008–09	2	Pro A	3rd			
2009–10	2	Pro A	1st			
2010–11	1	Bundesliga	16th			
2011–12	1	Bundesliga	13th			
2012–13	1	Bundesliga	15th			
2013–14	1	Bundesliga	14th			
2014–15	1	Bundesliga	16th			
2015–16	1	Bundesliga	12th			
2016–17	1	Bundesliga	4th			
2017–18	1	Bundesliga	6th	Fourth place	3 Champions League	QF
2018–19	1	Bundesliga	12th	Round of 16	3 Champions League	RS
2019–20	1	Bundesliga	12th	Round of 16	4 Europe Cup	SF (Note: The 2019–20 FIBA Europe Cup was declared void after the COVID-19 pandemic outbreak. Bayreuth was in the semifinals.)
2020–21	1	Bundesliga	10th	Group stage		
2021–22	1	Bundesliga	14th	Quarterfinals	4 Europe Cup	2R
2022–23	1	Bundesliga	18th	Quarterfinals		
2023–24	2	ProA	11th	First round		
2024–25	2	ProA	12th			
2025–26	2	ProA	10th			
