= 2019 BBL Playoffs =

German basketball postseason

Tournament details
- Country: Germany
- Dates: 18 May – 23 June
- Teams: 8
- Defending champions: Bayern Munich

Final positions
- Champions: Bayern Munich
- Runners-up: Alba Berlin
- Semifinalists: EWE Baskets Oldenburg; Rasta Vechta

The 2019 BBL Playoffs were the concluding postseason of the 2018–19 Basketball Bundesliga season. The Playoffs started on 18 May and ended 23 June 2019.

== Bracket ==
Quarterfinals
1	Bayern Munich	3
8	Löwen Braunschweig	0
4	Rasta Vechta	3
5	Brose Bamberg	1
2	EWE Baskets Oldenburg	3
7	Telekom Baskets Bonn	0
3	Alba Berlin	3
6	ratiopharm Ulm	0

Semifinals
1	Bayern Munich	3
4	Rasta Vechta	0
2	EWE Baskets Oldenburg	0
3	Alba Berlin	3

Finals
1	Bayern Munich	3
3	Alba Berlin	0

All times are local (UTC+2).

== Quarterfinals ==
The quarterfinals were played in a best of five format from 18 to 28 May 2019.

=== Bayern Munich vs Basketball Löwen Braunschweig ===
18 May 2019
20:30

Boxscore

Bayern Munich	70–59	Basketball Löwen Braunschweig
Scoring by quarter: 20–12, 12–7, 22–19, 16–21
Pts: Derrick Williams 12; Rebs: Dangubić, Lučić 6 Asts: Danilo Barthel 4		Pts: Shaquille Hines 20; Rebs: Shaquille Hines 9 Asts: Thomas Klepeisz 4
Munich leads series 1–0

Audi Dome, Munich
Attendance: 5,472
Referees: Moritz Reiter, Christof Madinger, Tamer Arik

24 May 2019
20:30

Boxscore

Basketball Löwen Braunschweig	74–84	Bayern Munich
Scoring by quarter: 14–28, 21–18, 25–19, 14–19
Pts: Christian Sengfelder 28; Rebs: Shaquille Hines 9 Asts: Joe Rahon 9		Pts: Derrick Williams 17; Rebs: Derrick Williams 8 Asts: Danilo Barthel 4
Munich leads series 2–0

Volkswagen Halle, Braunschweig
Attendance: 5,619
Referees: Anne Panther, Toni Rodriguez, Moritz Krüper

26 May 2019
18:00

Boxscore

Bayern Munich	87–77	Basketball Löwen Braunschweig
Scoring by quarter: 28–16, 14–24, 28–26, 17–11
Pts: Danilo Barthel 16; Rebs: Booker, Lučić 7 Asts: Maodo Lô 4		Pts: Christian Sengfelder 18; Rebs: Shaquille Hines 11; Asts: Joe Rahon 8
Munich wins series 3–0

Audi Dome, Munich
Attendance: 5,419
Referees: Robert Lottermoser, Carsten Straube, Konstantin Simonow

=== EWE Baskets Oldenburg vs Telekom Baskets Bonn ===
19 May 2019
15:00

Boxscore

EWE Baskets Oldenburg	105–94	Telekom Baskets Bonn
Scoring by quarter: 31–24, 22–32, 24–24, 28–14
Pts: Will Cummings 34; Rebs: Rašid Mahalbašić 10; Asts: Will Cummings 5		Pts: Charles Jackson 21; Rebs: Jackson, Polas Bartolo 8 Asts: Polas Bartolo 4
Oldenburg leads series 1–0

Große EWE Arena, Oldenburg
Attendance: 6,000
Referees: Clemens Fritz, Nesa Kovačević, Konstantin Simonow

21 May 2019
20:30

Boxscore

Telekom Baskets Bonn	87–97	EWE Baskets Oldenburg
Scoring by quarter: 25–25, 21–18, 15–30, 26–24
Pts: T. J. DiLeo 17; Rebs: Jackson, Subotić 7 Asts: T. J. DiLeo 3		Pts: Cummings, Mahalbašić 21; Rebs: Rašid Mahalbašić 15; Asts: Rašid Mahalbašić 10
Oldenburg leads series 2–0

Telekom Dome, Bonn
Attendance: 6,000
Referees: Martin Matip, Benjamin Barth, Tamer Arik

25 May 2019
18:00

Boxscore

EWE Baskets Oldenburg	97–84	Telekom Baskets Bonn
Scoring by quarter: 24–21, 25–25, 22–18, 26–20
Pts: Will Cummings 27; Rebs: Rašid Mahalbašić 9 Asts: Rašid Mahalbašić 8		Pts: Charles Jackson 28; Rebs: Jackson, Polas Bartolo 4 Asts: Josh Mayo 4
Oldenburg wins series 3–0

Große EWE Arena, Oldenburg
Attendance: 6,000
Referees: Christof Madinger, Enrico Streit, Steve Bittner

=== Alba Berlin vs ratiopharm Ulm ===
18 May 2019
18:00

Boxscore

Alba Berlin	107–78	ratiopharm Ulm
Scoring by quarter: 29–16, 31–27, 22–22, 25–13
Pts: Johannes Thiemann 15; Rebs: Luke Sikma 6 Asts: Derrick Walton 12		Pts: İsmet Akpınar 13; Rebs: Gavin Schilling 6 Asts: Akpınar, Miller 4
Berlin leads series 1–0

Mercedes-Benz Arena, Berlin
Attendance: 8,116
Referees: Benjamin Barth, Carsten Straube, Steve Bittner

21 May 2019
19:00

Boxscore

ratiopharm Ulm	83–98	Alba Berlin
Scoring by quarter: 19–23, 24–24, 20–22, 20–29
Pts: Javonte Green 18; Rebs: Gavin Schilling 7 Asts: İsmet Akpınar 4		Pts: Martin Hermannsson 23; Rebs: Luke Sikma 7 Asts: Derrick Walton 9
Berlin leads series 2–0

Arena Ulm/Neu-Ulm, Neu-Ulm
Attendance: 6,200
Referees: Clemens Fritz, Nesa Kovačević, Christof Madinger

26 May 2019
15:00

Boxscore

Alba Berlin	100–83	ratiopharm Ulm
Scoring by quarter: 17–20, 33–23, 25–15, 25–25
Pts: Peyton Siva 18; Rebs: Johannes Thiemann 8 Asts: Derrick Walton 7		Pts: Katin Reinhardt 21; Rebs: Gavin Schilling 7 Asts: Ryan Thompson 9
Berlin wins series 3–0

Mercedes-Benz Arena, Berlin
Attendance: 10,616
Referees: Martin Matip, Moritz Reiter, Moritz Krüper

=== Rasta Vechta vs Brose Bamberg ===
19 May 2019
18:30

Boxscore

Rasta Vechta	96–85	Brose Bamberg
Scoring by quarter: 27–19, 22–22, 27–28, 20–16
Pts: Austin Hollins 31; Rebs: Philipp Herkenhoff 11; Asts: T.J. Bray 12		Pts: Elias Harris 21; Rebs: Louis Olinde 5 Asts: Tyrese Rice 9
Vechta leads series 1–0

RASTA Dome, Vechta
Attendance: 3,140
Referees: Martin Matip, Enrico Streit, Moritz Krüper

22 May 2019
19:00

Boxscore

Brose Bamberg	102–98 (OT)	Rasta Vechta
Scoring by quarter: 11–15, 24–16, 30–31, 24–27, Overtime: 13–9
Pts: Augustine Rubit 31; Rebs: Augustine Rubit 14; Asts: Tyrese Rice 10		Pts: T.J. Bray 29; Rebs: Philipp Herkenhoff 10; Asts: T.J. Bray 12
Series tied, 1–1

Brose Arena, Bamberg
Attendance: 5,803
Referees: Robert Lottermoser, Carsten Straube, Steve Bittner

25 May 2019
20:30

Boxscore

Rasta Vechta	87–78	Brose Bamberg
Scoring by quarter: 23–13, 25–26, 25–18, 14–21
Pts: Austin Hollins 21; Rebs: T.J. Bray 8 Asts: T.J. Bray 13		Pts: Elias Harris 16; Rebs: Augustine Rubit 7 Asts: Tyrese Rice 9
Vechta leads series 2–1

RASTA Dome, Vechta
Attendance: 3,140
Referees: Anne Panther, Nesa Kovačević, Tamer Arik

28 May 2019
20:30

Boxscore

Brose Bamberg	86–90	Rasta Vechta
Scoring by quarter: 19–21, 27–21, 19–28, 21–20
Pts: Tyrese Rice 19; Rebs: Elias Harris 11; Asts: Nikos Zisis 7		Pts: Austin Hollins 22; Rebs: Bray, Young 8 Asts: T.J. Bray 14
Vechta wins series 3–1

Brose Arena, Bamberg
Attendance: 5,794
Referees: Moritz Reiter, Benjamin Barth, Konstantin Simonow

== Semifinals ==
The semifinals were played in a best of five format from 2 to 9 June 2019.

=== Bayern Munich vs Rasta Vechta ===
2 June 2019
18:00

Boxscore

Bayern Munich	98–88	Rasta Vechta
Scoring by quarter: 26–18, 26–24, 21–26, 25–20
Pts: Vladimir Lučić 24; Rebs: Devin Booker 9 Asts: Stefan Jović 6		Pts: Seth Hinrichs 21; Rebs: Bray, Hinrichs 3 Asts: T.J. Bray 7
Munich leads series 1–0

Audi Dome, Munich
Attendance: 5,393
Referees: Anne Panther, Moritz Reiter, Toni Rodriguez

4 June 2019
20:30

Boxscore

Rasta Vechta	71–89	Bayern Munich
Scoring by quarter: 20–20, 18–24, 20–20, 13–25
Pts: Bray, Young 15; Rebs: Seth Hinrichs 10; Asts: Seth Hinrichs 5		Pts: Nihad Đedović 13; Rebs: Devin Booker 7 Asts: Stefan Jović 6
Munich leads series 2–0

RASTA Dome, Vechta
Attendance: 3,140
Referees: Martin Matip, Carsten Straube, Steve Bittner

8 June 2019
20:30

Boxscore

Bayern Munich	95–80	Rasta Vechta
Scoring by quarter: 29–12, 20–29, 28–19, 18–20
Pts: Barthel, Lučić 17; Rebs: Leon Radošević 8 Asts: Stefan Jović 7		Pts: T.J. Bray 38; Rebs: Seth Hinrichs 7 Asts: Seth Hinrichs 9
Munich wins series 3–0

Audi Dome, Munich
Attendance: 6,102
Referees: Robert Lottermoser, Moritz Reiter, Tamer Arik

=== EWE Baskets Oldenburg vs Alba Berlin ===
2 June 2019
15:00

Boxscore

EWE Baskets Oldenburg	93–100	Alba Berlin
Scoring by quarter: 21–21, 23–25, 29–26, 20–28
Pts: Cummings, Mahalbašić 21; Rebs: Rašid Mahalbašić 8 Asts: Frantz Massenat 8		Pts: Peyton Siva 26; Rebs: Luke Sikma 9 Asts: Luke Sikma 6
Berlin leads series 1–0

Große EWE Arena, Oldenburg
Attendance: 6,000
Referees: Martin Matip, Nesa Kovačević, Enrico Streit

5 June 2019
20:30

Boxscore

Alba Berlin	79–68	EWE Baskets Oldenburg
Scoring by quarter: 17–13, 15–16, 28–23, 19–16
Pts: Rokas Giedraitis 13; Rebs: Landry Nnoko 12; Asts: three players 5		Pts: Rašid Mahalbašić 18; Rebs: four players 6 Asts: Will Cummings 5
Berlin leads series 2–0

Mercedes-Benz Arena, Berlin
Attendance: 9,263
Referees: Robert Lottermoser, Anne Panther, Toni Rodriguez

9 June 2019
15:00

Boxscore

EWE Baskets Oldenburg	89–100	Alba Berlin
Scoring by quarter: 25–28, 18–19, 24–23, 22–30
Pts: Will Cummings 31; Rebs: Rašid Mahalbašić 8 Asts: Rašid Mahalbašić 4		Pts: Siva, Thiemann 14; Rebs: Johannes Thiemann 8 Asts: Peyton Siva 10
Berlin wins series 3–0

Große EWE Arena, Oldenburg
Attendance: 6,000
Referees: Anne Panther, Clemens Fritz, Christof Madinger

== Finals ==
The finals were played in a best of five format from 16 to 23 June 2019.

16 June 2019
18:00

Boxscore

Bayern Munich	74–70	Alba Berlin
Scoring by quarter: 18–22, 18–15, 14–14, 24–19
Pts: Nihad Đedović 18; Rebs: Maodo Lô 5 Asts: Nihad Đedović 6		Pts: Peyton Siva 14; Rebs: Luke Sikma 6 Asts: Hermannsson, Siva 3
Munich leads series 1–0

Audi Dome, Munich
Attendance: 6,500
Referees: Martin Matip, Moritz Reiter, Steve Bittner

19 June 2019
20:30

Boxscore

Alba Berlin	77–82	Bayern Munich
Scoring by quarter: 25–15, 21–30, 13–18, 18–19
Pts: Giedraitis, Wagner 14; Rebs: Landry Nnoko 11; Asts: Peyton Siva 6		Pts: Devin Booker 16; Rebs: Devin Booker 7 Asts: Stefan Jović 7
Munich leads series 2–0

Mercedes-Benz Arena, Berlin
Attendance: 14,044
Referees: Anne Panther, Clemens Fritz, Christof Madinger

23 June 2019
18:00

Boxscore

Bayern Munich	93–88 (OT)	Alba Berlin
Scoring by quarter: 15–22, 17–24, 19–16, 25–14, Overtime: 17–12
Pts: Vladimir Lučić 23; Rebs: Barthel, Williams 5 Asts: Đedović, Jović 6		Pts: Peyton Siva 21; Rebs: Landry Nnoko 6 Asts: Luke Sikma 8
Munich wins series 3–0

Audi Dome, Munich
Attendance: 6,500
Referees: Robert Lottermoser, Carsten Straube, Nesa Kovačević
