= 2022 BBL Playoffs =

German basketball postseason

Tournament details
- Country: Germany
- Dates: 6 May – 19 June
- Teams: 8

Final positions
- Champions: Alba Berlin
- Runners-up: Bayern Munich
- Semifinalists: Telekom Baskets Bonn; Riesen Ludwigsburg

The 2022 BBL Playoffs was the concluding postseason of the 2021–22 Basketball Bundesliga season. The playoffs started on 6 May and ended on 19 June 2022.

== Playoff qualifying ==
| Seed | Team | Record | Clinched | | |
| Seed | Team | Record | Playoff berth | Seeded team | Top seed |
|---|---|---|---|---|---|
| 1 | Alba Berlin | 27–6 (Note: One game could not be played due to the COVID-19 pandemic.) | 17 April 2022 | 1 May 2022 | 7 May 2022 |
| 2 | Telekom Baskets Bonn | 26–8 | 10 April 2022 | 24 April 2022 | |
| 3 | Bayern Munich | 25–9 | 16 April 2022 | 6 May 2022 | |
| 4 | Riesen Ludwigsburg | 23–11 | 20 April 2021 | 11 May 2022 | |
| 5 | ratiopharm Ulm | 22–12 | 22 April 2021 | | |
| 6 | Niners Chemnitz | 22–12 | 21 April 2021 | | |
| 7 | Hamburg Towers | 19–15 | 1 May 2022 | | |
| 8 | Brose Bamberg | 18–16 | 8 May 2022 | | |

== Bracket ==
All three rounds of the playoffs were played in a best-of-five format, with the higher seeded team playing the first, third and fifth game at home.

Quarterfinals
1 | Alba Berlin | 3
8 | Brose Bamberg | 0
4 | Riesen Ludwigsburg | 3
5 | ratiopharm Ulm | 0
2 | Telekom Baskets Bonn | 3
7 | Hamburg Towers | 0
3 | Bayern Munich | 3
6 | Niners Chemnitz | 0

Semifinals
1 | Alba Berlin | 3
4 | Riesen Ludwigsburg | 0
2 | Telekom Baskets Bonn | 2
3 | Bayern Munich | 3

Finals
1 | Alba Berlin | 3
3 | Bayern Munich | 1

== Quarterfinals ==
The quarterfinals were played in a best of five format from 13 to 20 May 2022.

=== Alba Berlin vs Brose Bamberg ===
13 May 2022
19:00

Boxscore

| Alba Berlin | 114–89 | Brose Bamberg |
Scoring by quarter: 25–20, 36–25, 31–30, 22–14
| Pts: Johannes Thiemann 19; Rebs: Da Silva, Koumadje 7 Asts: Tamir Blatt 7 | | Pts: Omar Prewitt 17; Rebs: three players 4 Asts: Chris Dowe 7 |
Berlin leads series 1–0

Mercedes-Benz Arena, Berlin
Attendance: 5,765
Referees: Robert Lottermoser, Nesa Kovacevic, Armin Mutapcic

15 May 2022
18:00

Boxscore

| Alba Berlin | 97–85 | Brose Bamberg |
Scoring by quarter: 18–11, 29–23, 27–29, 23–22
| Pts: Jaleen Smith 18; Rebs: Johannes Thiemann 13; Asts: three players 5 | | Pts: Martinas Geben 21; Rebs: Chris Dowe 8 Asts: Omar Prewitt 10 |
Berlin leads series 2–0

Mercedes-Benz Arena, Berlin
Attendance: 6,171
Referees: Christoph Madinger, Moritz Reiter, Oliver Krause

19 May 2022
19:00

Boxscore

| Brose Bamberg | 70–103 | Alba Berlin |
Scoring by quarter: 18–27, 18–34, 18–23, 16–19
| Pts: Justin Robinson 12; Rebs: Akil Mitchell 7 Asts: Omar Prewitt 5 | | Pts: Da Silva 14; Rebs: Christ Koumadje 8 Asts: Maodo Lô 10 |
Berlin wins series 3–0

Brose Arena, Bamberg
Attendance: 4,017
Referees: Carsten Straube, Clemens Fritz, Tamer Arik

=== Telekom Baskets Bonn vs Hamburg Towers ===
13 May 2022
19:00

Boxsore

| Telekom Baskets Bonn | 100–98 (OT) | Hamburg Towers |
Scoring by quarter: 17–23, 24–19, 26–24, 24–25, Overtime: 9–7
| Pts: Javontae Hawkins 22; Rebs: Michael Kessens 6 Asts: Parker Jackson-Cartwright 8 | | Pts: Jaylon Brown 27; Rebs: Seth Hinrichs 14; Asts: Justus Hollatz 8 |
Bonn leads series 1–0

Telekom Dome, Bonn
Attendance: 6,000
Referees: Moritz Reiter, Clemens Fritz, Oliver Krause

15 May 2022
15:00

Boxscore

| Telekom Baskets Bonn | 89–81 | Hamburg Towers |
Scoring by quarter: 15–26, 22–20, 29–16, 23–19
| Pts: Parker Jackson-Cartwright 41; Rebs: Javontae Hawkins 8 Asts: Skyler Bowlin 3 | | Pts: Jaylon Brown 21; Rebs: Maik Kotsar 15; Asts: Brown, Hollatz 5 |
Bonn leads series 2–0

Telekom Dome, Bonn
Attendance: 5,910
Referees: Anne Panther, Carsten Straube, Tamer Arik

20 May 2022
19:00

Boxscore

| Hamburg Towers | 88–95 | Telekom Baskets Bonn |
Scoring by quarter: 22–27, 32–21, 21–16, 13–31
| Pts: Jaylon Brown 21; Rebs: Maik Kotsar 7 Asts: Seth Hinrichs 5 | | Pts: Parker Jackson-Cartwright 31; Rebs: Michael Kessens 11; Asts: Parker Jackson-Cartwright 4 |
Bonn wins series 3–0

Edel-optics.de Arena, Hamburg
Attendance: 3,400
Referees: Anne Panther, Benjamin Barth, Christian Theis

=== Bayern Munich vs Niners Chemnitz ===
13 May 2022
20:30

Boxscore

| Bayern Munich | 77–53 | Niners Chemnitz |
Scoring by quarter: 18–15, 18–16, 24–9, 17–13
| Pts: Deshaun Thomas 15; Rebs: Leon Radošević 7 Asts: Žan Mark Šiško 4 | | Pts: Sušinskas, Weidemann 9 Rebs: Jonas Richter 7 Asts: Frantz Massenat 6 |
Munich leads series 1–0

Audi Dome, Munich
Attendance: 3,784
Referees: Anne Panther, Carsten Straube, Christof Madinger

15 May 2022
20:30

Boxscore

| Bayern Munich | 93–76 | Niners Chemnitz |
Scoring by quarter: 27–13, 22–13, 23–25, 21–25
| Pts: Deshaun Thomas 22; Rebs: Deshaun Thomas 5 Asts: Žan Mark Šiško 7 | | Pts: Isiaha Mike 20; Rebs: Lockett, Mike 6 Asts: Frantz Massenat 7 |
Munich leads series 2–0

Audi Dome, Munich
Attendance: 3,342
Referees: Robert Lottermoser, Nebojsa Kovacevic, Christian Theis

20 May 2022
20:30

Boxscore

| Niners Chemnitz | 80–87 (OT) | Bayern Munich |
Scoring by quarter: 15–20, 16–21, 32–16, 11–17, Overtime: 6–13
| Pts: Isiaha Mike 24; Rebs: Jonas Richter 9 Asts: Massenat, Richter 5 | | Pts: Nick Weiler-Babb 19; Rebs: Nihad Đedović 8 Asts: Jaramaz, Weiler-Babb 3 |
Munich wins series 3–0

Chemnitz Arena, Chemnitz
Attendance: 4,732
Referees: Gentian Cici, Steve Bittner, Zulfikar Oruzgani

=== Riesen Ludwigsburg vs ratiopharm Ulm ===
14 May 2022
20:30

Boxscore

| Riesen Ludwigsburg | 104–99 (OT) | ratiopharm Ulm |
Scoring by quarter: 27–26, 11–20, 23–17, 22–22, Overtime: 14–9
| Pts: Jonah Radebaugh 20; Rebs: James Woodard 9 Asts: Jonah Radebaugh 9 | | Pts: Jaron Blossomgame 41; Rebs: Jaron Blossomgame 16; Asts: Semaj Christon 8 |
Ludwigsburg leads series 1–0

MHP-Arena, Ludwigsburg
Attendance: 1,748
Referees: Gentian Cici, Steve Bittner, Zulfikar Oruzgani

17 May 2022
19:00

Boxscore

| Riesen Ludwigsburg | 81–77 (OT) | ratiopharm Ulm |
Scoring by quarter: 20–23, 17–15, 16–15, 16–16, Overtime: 12–8
| Pts: Yorman Polas Bartolo 19; Rebs: James Woodard 8 Asts: Jonah Radebaugh 5 | | Pts: Semaj Christon 23; Rebs: Sindarius Thornwell 7 Asts: three players 2 |
Ludwigsburg leads series 2–0

MHP-Arena, Ludwigsburg
Attendance: 2,764
Referees: Moritz Reiter, Clemens Fritz, Benjamin Barth

19 May 2022
19:00

Boxscore

| ratiopharm Ulm | 79–97 | Riesen Ludwigsburg |
Scoring by quarter: 16–31, 29–27, 22–19, 22–20
| Pts: Karim Jallow 15; Rebs: Bretzel, Evans 4 Asts: five players 2 | | Pts: Justin Simon 20; Rebs: Jonas Wohlfarth-Bottermann 7 Asts: James Woodard 5 |
Ludwigsburg wins series 3–0

ratiopharm arena, Ulm
Attendance: 5,006
Referees: Robert Lottermoser, Christof Madinger, Armin Mutapcic

== Semifinals ==
The semifinals will be played in a best of five format between 27 May and 8 June 2022.

=== Alba Berlin vs Riesen Ludwigsburg ===
27 May 2022
19:00

Boxscore

| Alba Berlin | 89–84 | Riesen Ludwigsburg |
Scoring by quarter: 25–24, 20–19, 25–23, 19–18
| Pts: Maodo Lô 20; Rebs: Luke Sikma 15; Asts: Tamir Blatt 6 | | Pts: Jordan Hulls 26; Rebs: Yorman Polas Bartolo 6 Asts: Radebaugh, Woodard 5 |
Berlin leads series 1–0

Mercedes-Benz Arena, Berlin
Attendance: 8,211
Referees: Gentian Cici, Carsten Straube, Benjamin Barth

29 May 2022
18:00

Boxscore

| Alba Berlin | 100–76 | Riesen Ludwigsburg |
Scoring by quarter: 25–17, 24–18, 24–24, 27–17
| Pts: Louis Olinde 24; Rebs: Sikma, Thiemann 6 Asts: Blatt, Smith 6 | | Pts: Jonah Radebaugh 18; Rebs: Jonah Radebaugh 8 Asts: Hulls, Woodard 5 |
Berlin leads series 2–0

Mercedes-Benz Arena, Berlin
Attendance: 8,089
Referees: Robert Lottermoser, Oliver Krause, Zulifkar Oruzgani

3 June 2022
19:00

Boxscore

| Riesen Ludwigsburg | 67–73 | Alba Berlin |
Scoring by quarter: 15–16, 22–19, 12–25, 18–13
| Pts: Justin Simon 16; Rebs: Jonas Wohlfarth-Bottermann 10; Asts: Jonah Radebaugh 8 | | Pts: Ben Lammers 11; Rebs: Johannes Thiemann 9 Asts: Jaleen Smith 4 |
Berlin wins series 3–0

MHP-Arena, Ludwigsburg
Attendance: 3,800
Referees: Anne Panther, Christof Madinger, Armin Mutapcic

=== Telekom Baskets Bonn vs Bayern Munich ===
28 May 2022
20:30

Boxscore

| Telekom Baskets Bonn | 68–80 | Bayern Munich |
Scoring by quarter: 16–18, 19–15, 16–26, 17–21
| Pts: Parker Jackson-Cartwright 14; Rebs: Parker Jackson-Cartwright 9 Asts: Parker Jackson-Cartwright 3 | | Pts: Vladimir Lučić 19; Rebs: Nick Weiler-Babb 8 Asts: Jaramaz, Weiler-Babb 4 |
Munich leads series 1–0

Telekom Dome, Bonn
Attendance: 6,000
Referees: Moritz Reiter, Christof Madinger, Armin Mutapcic

30 May 2022
20:30

Boxscore

| Telekom Baskets Bonn | 81–82 | Bayern Munich |
Scoring by quarter: 25–21, 19–28, 20–15, 17–18
| Pts: Jeremy Morgan 17; Rebs: Michael Kessens 11; Asts: Karsten Tadda 4 | | Pts: Nick Weiler-Babb 18; Rebs: Lučić, Weiler-Babb 9 Asts: Othello Hunter 3 |
Munich leads series 2–0

Telekom Dome, Bonn
Attendance: 6,000
Referees: Anne Panther, Clemens Fritz, Nesa Kovacevic

4 June 2022
18:00

Boxscore

| Bayern Munich | 84–86 | Telekom Baskets Bonn |
Scoring by quarter: 20–24, 20–21, 23–19, 21–22
| Pts: Deshaun Thomas 18; Rebs: Vladimir Lučić 7 Asts: Nick Weiler-Babb 6 | | Pts: Javontae Hawkins 19; Rebs: Michael Kessens 8 Asts: Parker Jackson-Cartwright 6 |
Munich leads series 2–1

Audi Dome, Munich
Attendance: 6,007
Referees: Robert Lottermoser, Carsten Straube, Zulifkar Oruzgani

6 June 2022
18:00

Boxscore

| Bayern Munich | 80–83 | Telekom Baskets Bonn |
Scoring by quarter: 26–24, 21–24, 17–18, 16–17
| Pts: Nick Weiler-Babb 16; Rebs: Hunter, Rubit 8 Asts: four players 3 | | Pts: Parker Jackson-Cartwright 20; Rebs: Jeremy Morgan 8 Asts: Parker Jackson-Cartwright 4 |
Series tied, 2–2

Audi Dome, Munich
Attendance: 5,757
Referees: Gentian Cici, Oliver Krause, Benjamin Barth

8 June 2022
20:30

Boxscore

| Telekom Baskets Bonn | 74–87 | Bayern Munich |
Scoring by quarter: 16–24, 28–18, 17–27, 13–18
| Pts: Parker Jackson-Cartwright 25; Rebs: Leon Kratzer 6 Asts: Parker Jackson-Cartwright 10 | | Pts: Nick Weiler-Babb 18; Rebs: Othello Hunter 10; Asts: Vladimir Lučić 6 |
Munich wins series 3–2

Telekom Dome, Bonn
Attendance: 6,000
Referees: Robert Lottermoser, Anne Panther, Gentian Cici

== Finals ==
The final was played in a best of five format between 10 and 19 June 2022.

10 June 2022
20:30

Boxscore

| Alba Berlin | 86–73 | Bayern Munich |
Scoring by quarter: 22–20, 18–23, 21–19, 25–11
| Pts: Yovel Zoosman 14; Rebs: Oscar da Silva 5 Asts: Tamir Blatt 8 | | Pts: Andreas Obst 17; Rebs: three players 3 Asts: Nick Weiler-Babb 6 |
Berlin leads series 1–0

Mercedes-Benz Arena, Berlin
Attendance: 10,567
Referees: Anne Panther, Gentian Cici, Zulifkar Oruzgani

14 June 2022
19:00

Boxscore

| Bayern Munich | 58–71 | Alba Berlin |
Scoring by quarter: 16–18, 10–20, 17–19, 15–14
| Pts: Deshaun Thomas 13; Rebs: Nick Weiler-Babb 7 Asts: Nick Weiler-Babb 5 | | Pts: Lô, Smith 13; Rebs: Da Silva, Olinde 6 Asts: Maodo Lô 4 |
Berlin leads series 2–0

Audi Dome, Munich
Attendance: 6,500
Referees: Robert Lottermoser, Anne Panther, Carsten Straube

17 June 2022
19:00

Boxscore

| Alba Berlin | 60–90 | Bayern Munich |
Scoring by quarter: 15–23, 18–29, 13–20, 14–18
| Pts: Oscar da Silva 15; Rebs: Christ Koumadje 6 Asts: Tamir Blatt 6 | | Pts: Thomas, Weiler-Babb 19; Rebs: Augustine Rubit 7 Asts: Žan Mark Šiško 6 |
Berlin leads series 2–1

Mercedes-Benz Arena, Berlin
Attendance: 14,500
Referees: Robert Lottermoser, Gentian Cici, Christof Madinger

19 June 2022
15:00

Boxscore

| Bayern Munich | 81–96 | Alba Berlin |
Scoring by quarter: 17–26, 19–26, 18–24, 27–20
| Pts: Augustine Rubit 15; Rebs: Augustine Rubit 6 Asts: Ognjen Jaramaz 4 | | Pts: Jaleen Smith 23; Rebs: Oscar da Silva 7 Asts: Luke Sikma 8 |
Berlin wins series 3–1

Audi Dome, Munich
Attendance: 5,469
Referees: Robert Lottermoser, Gentian Cici, Anne Panther
