= Katin Reinhardt =

American basketball player

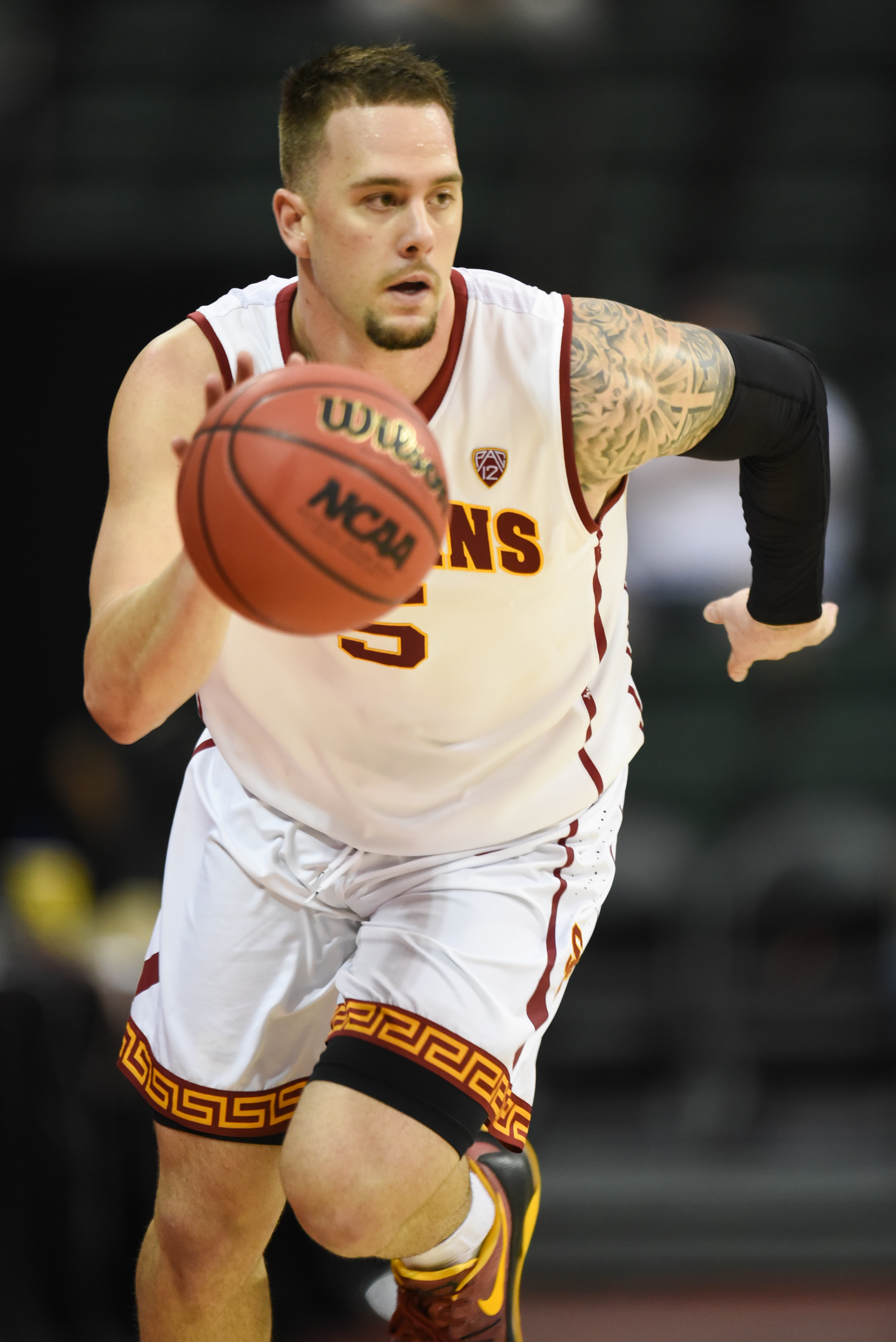
- Reinhardt playing for USC in 2015

Personal information
- Born: August 21, 1993 (age 33) Laguna Beach, California, U.S.
- Listed height: 6 ft 6 in (1.98 m)
- Listed weight: 210 lb (95 kg)

Career information
- High school: Mater Dei (Santa Ana, California)
- College: UNLV (2012–2013); USC (2014–2016); Marquette (2016–2017)
- NBA draft: 2017: undrafted
- Playing career: 2017–2020
- Position: Shooting guard

Career history
- 2017–2018: Dzūkija
- 2018: Igokea
- 2018–2019: ratiopharm Ulm
- 2019–2020: Belfius Mons-Hainaut

Career highlights
- Pro Basketball League All-Star (2020); Third-team USA Today All-American (2012)

Katin Thomas Reinhardt (born August 21, 1993) is an American former professional basketball player. A native of Laguna Beach, California, he played high school basketball at Mater Dei High School in Santa Ana, where he was ranked among the top 50 players of his class, was a USA Today All-American and won the John R. Wooden Award as the best high school player in CIF Division I.

He played his freshman year of college basketball at UNLV but he transferred after one season, and played two years at USC before transferring a second time, spending his last season in college at Marquette. After going undrafted in the 2017 NBA draft, Reinhardt started his professional career in Lithuania with Dzūkija. He has since played in Lithuania, Bosnia and Herzegovina, Germany and Belgium.

== High school career ==
Reinhardt was born in Laguna Beach, the son of Ernie and Sydney Reinhardt. His father is a former football player who played at Orange Coast College in Costa Mesa. Reinhardt lived in Dana Point with his family and attended Mater Dei High School in Santa Ana, where he played since his freshman year and averaged 12 points per game in his sophomore season. In his junior season, Reinhardt averaged 17 points per game. He scored 17 points in the state Division I championship game against De La Salle, being the top scorer of the game and helping his team winning 43–36. At the end of his junior year, Reinhardt was an honorable mention All-State selection, and was named in the All-Orange County First Team.

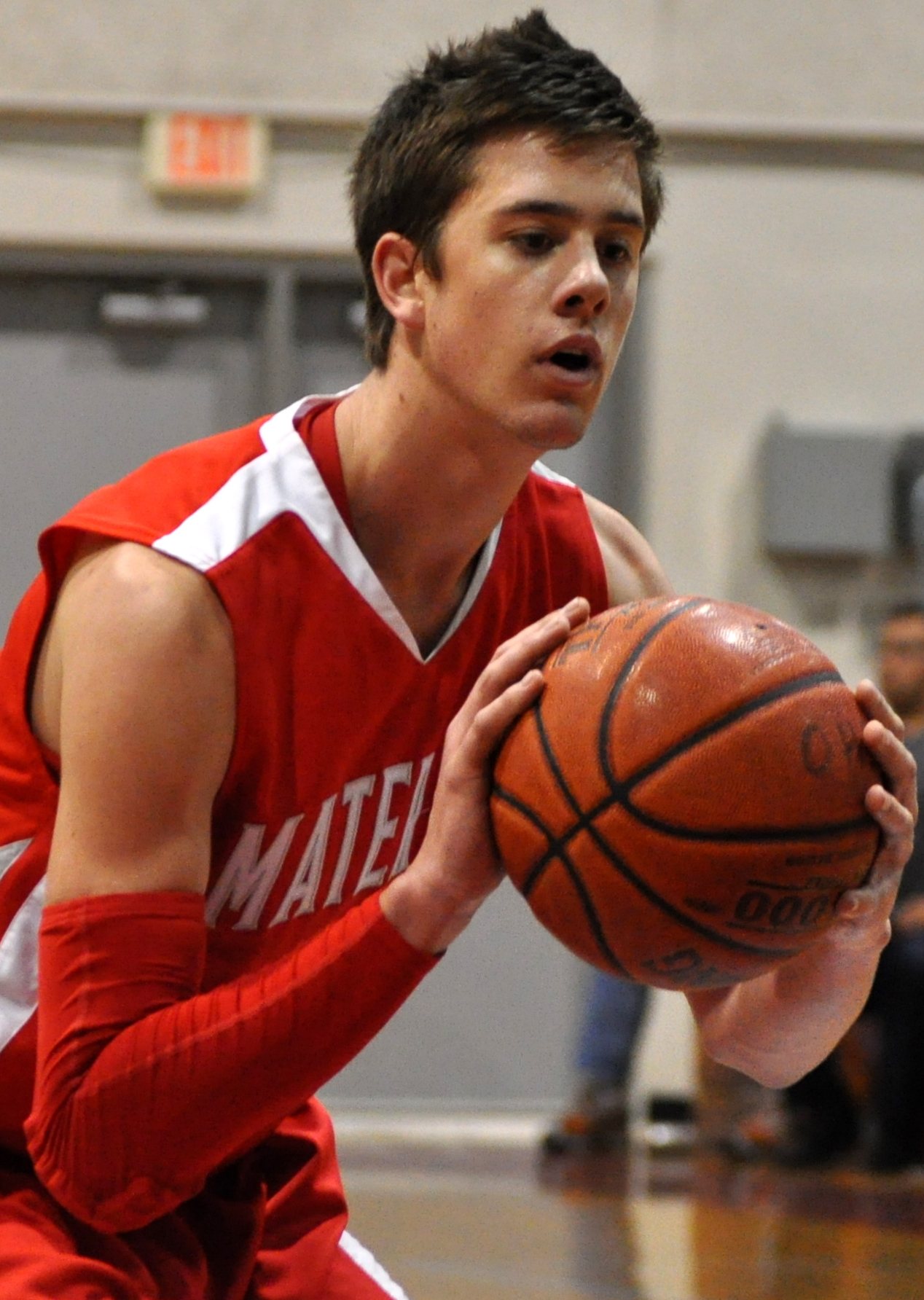
Reinhardt playing at Mater Dei in 2009

Reinhardt entered his senior year as one of the top rated high school players in the nation, being ranked the 43rd best player in his class by Rivals.com, 55th by Scout.com and 60th by ESPN. In January 2012, in a game against Christ the King High School of Middle Village, New York, Reinhardt hit nine three-pointers, tying the school record for three point field goals made in a single game established in 1994 by Miles Simon and Clay McKnight; he had a total of 35 points in that game, a season high. On March 24, 2012 Reinhardt scored 30 points in the Division I championship game against Sheldon High School, shooting 11/17 from the field (6/12 on three-pointers). Mater Dei won the Division I championship, Reinhardt's second state title. Reinhardt averaged 18.6 points per game in his senior year.

In April 2012, the Los Angeles Times named him California State Player of the Year, and he was a finalist for the California Mr. Basketball award, together with teammate Xavier Johnson. He was also named co-MVP of the CIF Southern Section, and was an all-state first team selection. He won the John R. Wooden Award as the best high school player in CIF Division I, USA Today named him in the All-American Third Team, and ESPN HS named him an All-American as a fourth-team selection. He was ranked the 39th best player in the nation by 247Sports.com (7th best at the shooting guard position, 2nd overall in the state of California), 47th by ESPN and 38th by Rivals.com. He also took part in the 2012 Ballislife All-American Game, during which he scored 11 points.

=== Recruiting ===
Reinhardt was recruited by several major NCAA Division I programs, and received offers from Arizona, Baylor, Colorado, NC State, St. John's, Texas, UNLV, USC, Utah, Washington and West Virginia. He had initially committed to play for USC, but in May 2011 he reopened his recruitment and signed with UNLV on August 11, 2011. According to the Las Vegas Sun, at the time of his commitment Reinhardt was the highest-ranked UNLV recruit since Anthony Marshall in 2009.

College recruiting
Name	Hometown	School	Height	Weight	Commit date
Katin Reinhardt; SG	Dana Point, CA	Mater Dei	6 ft 5 in (1.96 m)	195 lb (88 kg)	Aug 11, 2011
Katin Reinhardt; SG	Recruit ratings: Scout: Rivals: (94)				
Overall recruit ranking: Rivals: #38 ESPN: #47
Note: In many cases, Scout, Rivals, 247Sports, On3, and ESPN may conflict in their listings of height and weight.; In these cases, the average was taken. ESPN grades are on a 100-point scale.; Sources: "UNLV 2012 Basketball Commits". Rivals.; "UNLV 2012 Basketball Commits". Scout.; "UNLV 2012 Basketball Commits". ESPN.; "Scout.com Team Recruiting Rankings". Scout.; "2012 Team Ranking". Rivals.

== College career ==
=== UNLV ===
Reinhardt was cited by Bleacher Report as the best freshman on the UNLV roster together with Anthony Bennett. He made his debut with the Runnin' Rebels on November 12, 2012 in the season opener against Northern Arizona, being selected as a starter and scoring 14 points along with 3 rebounds and 4 assists. On November 23 against Oregon he scored a new season-high 18 points. On December 1 he had a season-best 7 assists, with 10 points, against Hawaii. On December 13 he posted his season high in rebounds with 6 against La Verne, a mark he also reached on February 20, 2013 against Colorado State. During the 2013 Mountain West Conference tournament Reinhardt was named in the All-Tournament team, scoring a career-high 21 points against Colorado State on March 15. He also participated in the 2013 NCAA tournament, playing 31 minutes and scoring 11 points against California.

At the end of the season, Reinhardt was fourth on the team in scoring at 10.1 points per game, was the third-best three-point shooter at 35.1%, was second in assists per game behind Anthony Marshall, and was the best free throw shooter with 89.2%.

=== USC ===
After his freshman season at UNLV, Reinhardt decided to transfer, and in July 2013 he announced his signing with USC. He cited his desire to stay closer to his hometown. He sat out the entire 2013–14 season, following NCAA transfer rules.

Reinhardt made his debut in an USC uniform on November 15, 2014 against Portland State, starting the game and scoring 11 points in 30 minutes of playing time. In the following game against Tennessee Tech he scored 19 points, 2 shy of his career high. On December 7, in the game against Utah State, he posted a season-high 6 assists. On January 29, 2015 in a game against Colorado, Reinhardt scored a career-high 35 points, shooting 12/27 from the field (9/18 on three-pointers) and 2/2 from the free throw line. His 9 three-pointers tied the all-time record for threes in a single game for USC, established by Anthony Pendleton in 1987. Throughout the season, Reinhardt started 22 of his 31 games, scoring more than 10 points in 20 games. He led his team in scoring at 12.5 points per game, was the best free throw shooter at 81.5%, and ranked third in assists per game.

In Reinhardt's second season with USC he lost his starting role, and in the first nine games of the season he was a reserve, playing 24 minutes per game. On December 3 tied his career high in assists with 7 against UC Santa Barbara. He started his first game of the season on December 13 against Yale, and scored 14 points in 26 minutes. On December 17 he scored a season-high 29 points against Cal Poly, shooting 9/12 from the field (7/9 from the three-point line) and 4/5 on free throws. His 29 points were the highest mark for all USC players that season. On December 23 he scored 26 points Lafayette. On January 1, 2016 he had a season-best 6 rebounds against Washington State. On January 18, 2016, he reached the 1,000 career points mark with an 18-point performance against Washington State. After starting 18 straight games between December 13 and February 21, Reinhardt again lost his starter status on February 25. At the end of the season, he ranked fifth on the team in scoring at 11.4 points per game, was the best free throw shooter at 78.3% and had the third highest assist rate at 1.4 per game.

=== Marquette ===
In late March 2016, after the season had ended, Reinhardt announced that he was leaving USC as a graduate transfer. On April 10, Reinhardt chose to sign with Marquette. Being a graduate transfer, Reinhardt was granted immediate eligibility to play in the 2016–17 season.

Reinhardt debuted on November 11 against Vanderbilt, scoring nine points in 26 minutes of playing time as a starter. He started the first four games of the season, but was then left out of the starting lineup, and played the rest of the season as the first player off the bench. On November 22 scored 16 points against IUPUI with a career-high 8 free throws made. On January 21, 2017 he scored a season-high 21 points against Creighton, and also tied his career high with 7 assists. On February 11 he recorded his career high in rebounds with 8 against Georgetown. On March 17, 2017, during the game against South Carolina, he became the second player in the history of NCAA basketball to participate in the NCAA Tournament with three different teams. Reinhardt averaged 10.8 points, 2.7 rebounds and 2.1 assists per game in his last season of college basketball, being the fifth best scorer on his team.

=== College statistics ===
Year	Team	GP	GS	MPG	FG%	3P%	FT%	RPG	APG	SPG	BPG	PPG
2012–13	UNLV	35	33	29.2	.358	.351	.892	2.0	2.5	0.9	0.2	10.1
2013–14	USC	Did not play – transfer										
2014–15	USC	31	22	28.6	.380	.386	.815	2.4	1.7	1.0	0.2	12.5
2015–16	USC	34	18	26.9	.444	.373	.783	2.8	1.4	1.0	0.1	11.4
2016–17	Marquette	29	4	25.8	.403	.375	.889	2.7	2.1	0.6	0.1	10.8
Career		129	77	27.7	.395	.370	.848	2.5	1.9	0.9	0.2	11.2

== Professional career ==
After the end of his college career, Reinhardt was automatically eligible for the 2017 NBA draft, where he went undrafted. He then signed his first professional contract with Dzūkija in Lithuania. He played in the first part of the 2017–18 LKL season, averaging 13.1 points, 3.1 rebounds and 1.4 assists in 22.3 minutes of average playing time. In January 2018 he left the team and signed with Igokea, a Bosnian team. He played in the 2017–18 ABA League First Division, and over 3 games he posted averaged of 17 points, 4.3 rebounds and 3.7 assists per game. In February 2018 Reinhardt moved to Germany and signed for ratiopharm Ulm, a team of the Basketball Bundesliga, replacing Trey Lewis. In the final part of the 2017–18 Basketball Bundesliga he averaged 14.4 points, 2.1 rebounds and 2.3 assists, shooting a career-high 41.6% from three.

He stayed with ratiopharm Ulm also for the following season, and he had the chance to debut at international level, appearing in 11 games during the 2018–19 EuroCup and averaging 7.7 points, 1.3 rebounds and 1.3 assists in 16.3 minutes per game. During the 2018–19 Basketball Bundesliga he averaged 6.1 points in 13.2 minutes per game during the regular season (24 appearances), and also appeared in 3 games during the 2019 BBL Playoffs, scoring 21 points against Alba Berlin on May 26, 2019, shooting 7/11 from the three-point line.

In August 2019 Reinhardt signed for Mons-Hainaut of the Belgian Pro Basketball League. He played 17 games, averaging 11.2 points per game; he also played for Team World during the 2020 All-Star Game, playing 14 minutes and scoring four points. The 2019–20 Pro Basketball League was cut short by the coronavirus pandemic and ended on March 13, 2020.
