= Javontae Hawkins =

American basketball player (born 1993)

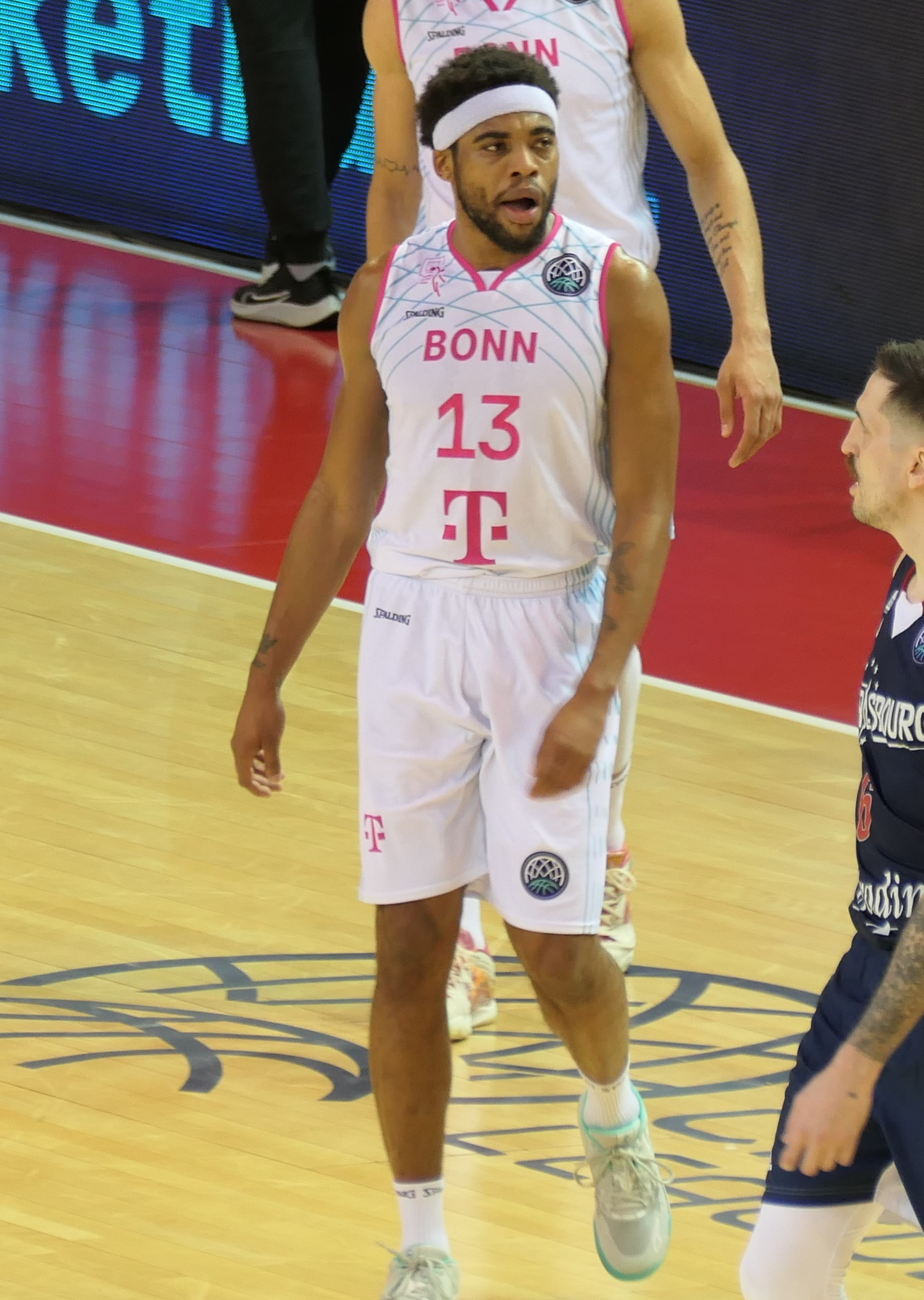
- Hawkins with Bonn in 2023

No. 13 – Hapoel Ironi Eilat
- Position: Small forward / shooting guard
- League: Israeli Basketball Premier League

Personal information
- Born: November 13, 1993 (age 33) Flint, Michigan, U.S.
- Listed height: 6 ft 5 in (1.96 m)
- Listed weight: 211 lb (96 kg)

Career information
- High school: Powers Catholic (Flint, Michigan); Huntington Prep (Huntington, West Virginia
- College: South Florida (2012–2014); Eastern Kentucky (2015–2016); Fordham (2016–2017)
- NBA draft: 2017: undrafted
- Playing career: 2017–present

Career history
- 2017–2018: Vilpas Vikings
- 2018–2019: Holargos
- 2019–2020: Crailsheim Merlins
- 2021–2022: Telekom Baskets Bonn
- 2022–2023: Limoges CSP
- 2023: Telekom Baskets Bonn
- 2023–2024: Samara
- 2024–2025: Shanghai Sharks
- 2025: Merkezefendi
- 2025–2026: Spartak Subotica
- 2026–present: Hapoel Ironi Eilat

Career highlights
- FIBA Champions League champion (2023); 2× All-Bundesliga Second Team (2020, 2022); Serbian League champion (2026); Second-team All-OVC (2016)

Javontae Aaron Hawkins (born November 13, 1993) is an American professional basketball player for Hapoel Ironi Eilat of the Israeli Basketball Premier League.

He played his first two years of college basketball with the South Florida Bulls. Hawkins later played also with Eastern Kentucky and Fordham before going undrafted in the 2017 NBA draft.

== Early life ==
Hawkins was born in Flint, Michigan. His parents are Jeff and Diane Hawkins, and his five siblings are Jasmine, Janae, Jerell, Jeff Jr. and Janiyah.

== High school career ==
Hawkins started his high school career at Beecher High School in Michigan, playing on its regional championship team as a freshman. He then earned First Team all-state honors as a junior in Michigan, while playing at Powers Catholic High School, to which he had transferred as a sophomore. He spent two years at Huntington Prep in Huntington, West Virginia, where he averaged 17.5 points and 3.5 rebounds per game.

He was a four-star prospect, and the No. 89 overall player in the 2012 class. Hawkins was also ranked 16th at his position by ESPN, and No. 96 overall by CBS Sports Network.

== College career ==
As a freshman at South Florida in 2012–13, Hawkins averaged 14.4 minutes, 4.5 points, and 1.6 rebounds per game. As a sophomore in 2013–14, he averaged 12.0 minutes, 3.7 points, and 1.3 rebounds per game.

The following season Hawkins transferred to Eastern Kentucky. He sat out the 2014–15 season due to NCAA transfer rules. During his junior year campaign in 2015–16, he averaged 28.9 minutes, 17.0 points (5th in the conference), 4.8 rebounds, 2.1 assists, and 1.0 steals per game while shooting 50.1% from the floor (5th), and earned 2nd team all-Ohio Valley Conference honors.

For his final season, in 2016–17 he played with the Fordham Rams, with whom Hawkins was 1st in points (14.0), second in rebounds (4.9), and had 1.0 assists and 1.0 steals per game, while shooting 84.3% (4th in the conference) from the free throw line.

== Professional career ==
=== Vilpas (2017–2018) ===
After going undrafted in the 2017 NBA draft, Hawkins joined the Vilpas Vikings of the Korisliiga in Finland. With Vilpas in 2017–18, in 54 games he went on to average 24.6 minutes, 14.3 points, 4.3 rebounds, 1.1 assists, and 0.9 steals per game, while shooting 50.3% from the floor, 40.6% from three-point range, and 79.9% from the free throw line.

=== Holargos (2018–2019) ===
On July 13, 2018, Hawkins joined Holargos of the Greek Basket League. With Holargos in 2018–19, in 29 games he averaged 25.2 minutes, 11.7 points, 3.9 rebounds, 1.2 assists, and 0.9 steals per game, while shooting 46.4% from the floor.

=== Crailsheim Merlins (2019–2020) ===
On August 3, 2019, Hawkins signed with Crailsheim Merlins of the Basketball Bundesliga. In 2019-20 , in 20 games Hawkins averaged 28.3 minutes, 15.6 points, 4.5 rebounds, 1.4 assists, and 0.9 steals per game, while shooting 44.9% from the floor and 79.8% from three-point range.

=== Telekom Baskets Bonn (2021–2022) ===
Hawkins signed with Riesen Ludwigsburg on July 27, 2020, but tore a cruciate ligament in his knee during the preseason. The tear ended up being a season-ending injury.

On December 16, 2021, Hawkins signed with Telekom Baskets Bonn. In 2021-22 with the team, in 29 games Hawkins averaged 26.8 minutes, 15.5 points, 3.6 rebounds, and 1.1 assists per game.

=== Limoges CSP (2022–2023) ===
On July 18, 2022, he signed with the French team Limoges CSP of the LNB Pro A. In 20 games Hawkins averaged 28.6 minutes, 13.9 points, 3.4 rebounds, and 1.6 assists per game, while shooting 80.5% from the free throw line.

=== Telekom Baskets Bonn (2023) ===
On February 1, 2023, Hawkins signed with Telekom Baskets Bonn of the German Basketball Bundesliga and the Basketball Champions League.

=== Samara (2023–2024) ===
In 2023-24, he played for Samara of the VTB United League. In 39 games Hawkins averaged 25.1 minutes, 11.2 points, 2.7 rebounds, and 1.2 assists per game, while shooting 45.0% from the field and 86.2% from the free throw line.

=== Shanghai Dongfang Sharks (2023–2024) ===
In 2023-24, he played for the Shanghai Dongfang Sharks of the Chinese Basketball Association (CBA). In 21 games Hawkins averaged 9.2 minutes, 7.2 points, 2.0 rebounds, and 0.8 assists per game, while shooting 91.9% from the free throw line.

=== Merkezefendi Basket (2025) ===
On August 3, 2025, he signed with Merkezefendi Belediyesi Denizli of the Turkish Basketbol Süper Ligi (BSL). In 11 games Hawkins averaged 19.2 minutes, 7.1 points, 2.6 rebounds, and 0.4 assists per game, while shooting 91.9% from the free throw line.

=== Spartak (2025-26) ===
In 2023-24, he played for the Serbian team Spartak of the AdmiralBet ABA League. In 7 games Hawkins averaged 19.0 minutes, 10.9 points,1.3 rebounds, and 1.0 assists per game, while shooting 48.0% from the field, 40.0% from three point range, and 87.0% from the free throw line.

=== Hapoel Eilat (2026–present) ===
In 2026-27, Hawkins is playing for Hapoel Ironi Eilat of the Israeli Basketball Premier League.
