= T. J. Bray =

American basketball player (born 1992)

Personal information
- Born: June 14, 1992 (age 33) New Berlin, Wisconsin, U.S.
- Listed height: 6 ft 5 in (1.96 m)
- Listed weight: 207 lb (94 kg)

Career information
- High school: Catholic Memorial (Waukesha, Wisconsin)
- College: Princeton (2010–2014)
- NBA draft: 2014: undrafted
- Playing career: 2014–2021
- Position: Point guard / shooting guard

Career history
- 2014–2015: Pallacanestro Trapani
- 2015–2016: Casale Monferrato
- 2017: Basic-Fit Brussels
- 2017–2018: Kolossos Rodou
- 2018–2019: Rasta Vechta
- 2019–2021: Bayern Munich
- 2020–2021: →Zaragoza
- 2021: Panathinaikos

Career highlights
- Greek League champion (2021); Greek Cup winner (2021); All-Bundesliga First Team (2019); German All-Star (2019); Bundesliga assists leader (2019); First-team All-Ivy League (2014); Second-team All-Ivy League (2013); Wisconsin Mr. Basketball (2010)

Thomas Joseph "T. J." Bray (born June 14, 1992) is an American former professional basketball player who played seven seasons in several top professional leagues in Europe. Bray played college basketball for the Princeton Tigers.

== Early life and high school ==
Bray grew up in New Berlin, Wisconsin and attended Catholic Memorial High School. As a senior, Bray was named Wisconsin Mr. Basketball after averaging 17.9 points, 8.4 rebounds, and 6.6 assists per game and led Catholic Memorial to the WIAA Division 2 state title, recording 20 points, 12 rebounds, five assists and six steals in the state championship game. He committed to play basketball at Princeton University, which plays in the non-scholarship Ivy League, over offers from North Dakota and Florida Gulf Coast.

== College career ==
Bray played four seasons for the Princeton Tigers and was a starter for his final three years. He played in all 32 of Princeton's games coming off the bench as a freshman, averaging 1.5 points per game. In his first season as a starter, Bray averaged 7.2 points per game. Bray was named second team All-Ivy after averaging 9.9 points, 3.8 rebounds, 3.6 assists and 1.8 steals as a junior. As a senior, he was a unanimous first team All-Ivy selection after leading the Tigers with 18 points per game, 34 steals, 133 assists and a .537 field goal percentage. Bray finished his collegiate career with 1,024 points scored and third in school history with 374 assists.

== Professional career ==
=== Pallacanestro Trapani ===
After going unselected in the 2014 NBA draft, Bray played in the 2014 NBA Summer League as a member of the Toronto Raptors roster. He averaged 4.4 points, 1.6 rebounds, 1.2 assists, and 18.2 minutes played over five games for the Raptors but ultimately was not invited to preseason training camp. He then signed with Pallacanestro Trapani of Serie A2 Basket, the Italian second division, on August 6, 2014. In his first professional season, Bray averaged 9.5 points, 3.0 assists, and 3.9 rebounds per game in 29 games played.

=== Casale Monferrato ===
Following the Serie A2 season, Bray played in the 2015 NBA Summer League with the New York Knicks, but only appeared in two games. Bray returned to Serie A2 for a second season after signing with Novipiù Casale Monferrato on August 4, 2015. Bray played in 35 games with Casale Monferrato, averaging 14.7 points, 3.5 rebounds and 3.1 assists per game.

=== Basic-Fit Brussels ===
Bray initially signed a contract to play for Riesen Ludwigsburg of the German Basketball Bundesliga (BBL) in the summer of 2016 but was unable to play for the team due to a knee injury he suffered while back in the U.S. After rehabbing the injury for several months, Bray signed with Basic-Fit Brussels of the Belgian Pro Basketball League (PBL) on January 10, 2017 for the remainder of the 2016–17 season. After joining the team Bray played in 33 games, all starts, and averaged 8.2 points, 2.3 rebounds, 2.1 assists and 1.2 steals per game and was named honorable mention All-PBL by Eurobasket.com.

=== Kolossos Rodou ===
Bray signed with Kolossos Rodou B.C. of the Greek Basket League (GBL) on August 3, 2017. Bray averaged 12.1 points, 3.4 rebounds, 3.4 assists and 1.1 steals in 27 GBL games (26 starts).

=== Rasta Vechta ===
Bray signed with SC Rasta Vechta of the BBL on July 14, 2018. He was named the player of the week for the 4th round of the BBL season following a 36 point, three rebound, eight assist performance in a 106-100 win over Mitteldeutscher BC. Bray was selected as a reserve to play in the 2019 BBL All-Star Game as a member of the "International" team. Bray averaged 14.8 points, 3.2 rebounds, a BBL-leading 7.7 assists, and 1.2 steals per game in 33 games (all starts) as Rasta Vechta finished in fourth place in the BBL regular season and 19.7 points, 9.1 assists and 4.9 rebounds and 2.3 steals in the postseason. He was named first team All-Basketball Bundesliga and finished second to Will Cummings in MVP voting.

=== Bayern Munich ===
Bray agreed to a two-year contract with Bayern Munich on July 11, 2019. Bray missed the first three months of the season due to a tendon injury in his foot. In 10 Euroleague games, he averaged 6.4 points, 1.7 rebounds and 2.7 assists per game. Bray re-signed with the team on August 13, 2020.

=== Casademont Zaragoza ===
On December 3, 2020, Bray signed with Casademont Zaragoza of the Liga ACB.

=== Panathinaikos ===
On February 8, 2021, Bray signed a two-and-a-half-year contract with Panathinaikos of the Greek Basket League and the EuroLeague, returning in Greece after his first stint with Kolossos Rodou three years earlier. In 12 league games, he averaged 10.8 points, 3 assists and 1.7 rebounds, shooting with 53.3% from beyond the arc, 63.2% from the field and 66.7% from the free throw line. On August 15, 2021, Bray officially parted ways with the Greek club, citing serious personal reasons overseas. He announced his retirement from professional basketball on September 9.
