= Pedro Calles =

Spanish basketball coach

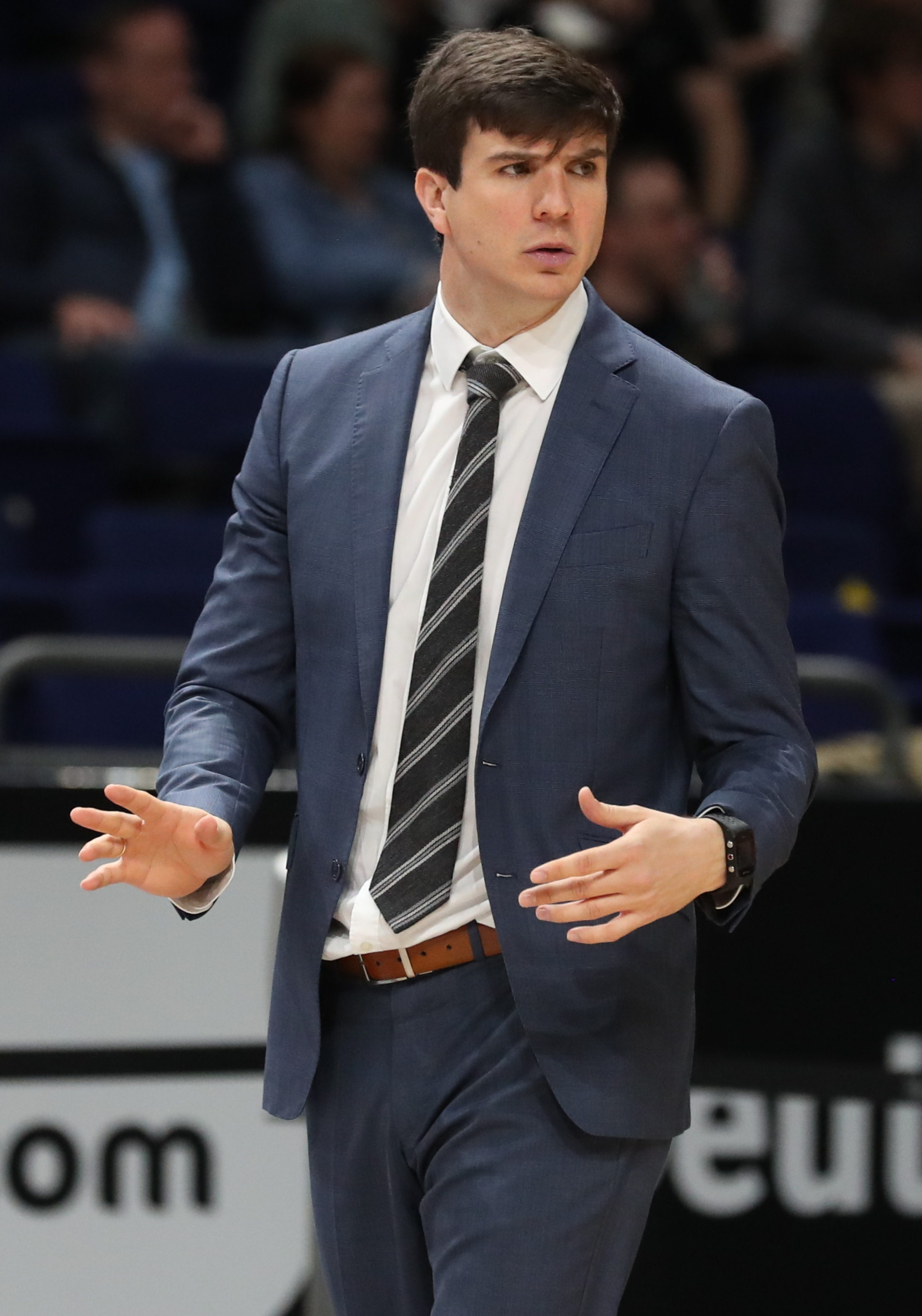

Alba Berlin
- Position: Head coach
- League: BBL

Personal information
- Born: 24 August 1983 (age 43) Córdoba, Spain
- Coaching career: 2010–present

Career history

Coaching
- 2010–2011: Plasencia Extremadura (assistant)
- 2011–2012: Plasencia Extremadura
- 2013–2015: Artland Dragons (assistant)
- 2015–2018: Rasta Vechta (assistant)
- 2018–2020: Rasta Vechta
- 2020–2022: Hamburg Towers
- 2022–2024: EWE Baskets Oldenburg
- 2025–present: Alba Berlin

Career highlights
- German Bundesliga Coach of the Year (2019)

Pedro Calles (born 24 August 1983) is a Spanish professional basketball coach, currently managing Alba Berlin of the German Basketball Bundesliga (BBL). Born in Córdoba, he has coached in both Spain and Germany since 2010.

== Career ==
After growing up in Córdoba, Calles graduated in sports science in Granada.

In 2012, Calles moved to Germany to work for the Artland Dragons, first as athletic trainer and a year later as assistant coach. In 2015, he moved to Rasta Vechta. After the team was promoted from the ProA in 2017–18, Calles was named head coach of the team. In the 2018–19 season, Calles had the most successful season ever in the history of Vechta. The team reached the semifinals of the playoffs, eliminating Brose Bamberg in the quarterfinals. Calles was named the Basketball Bundesliga Coach of the Year.

In the 2019–20 season, Calles made his European coaching debut in the Basketball Champions League campaign with Rasta.

On 26 June 2020, Calles signed a two-year contract as head coach of the Hamburg Towers. He guided the Hamburg team to two consecutive quarterfinal appearances in the German Bundesliga. In May 2022, he signed a three-year deal with fellow Bundesliga side EWE Baskets Oldenburg. He was dismissed by the Oldenburg team on 4 November, 2024.

In March 2025, Calles was named head coach of Alba Berlin after the team dismissed Israel Gonzalez.
