= Justin Edler-Davis =

American basketball player (born 1996)

No. 10 – Rasta Vechta
- Position: Small forward / shooting guard
- League: Basketball Bundesliga

Personal information
- Born: February 9, 1998 (age 28) San Diego, California, U.S.
- Listed height: 6 ft 4 in (1.93 m)
- Listed weight: 215 lb (98 kg)

Career information
- High school: Samuel Morse (San Diego, California)
- College: Cal State Bakersfield (2016–2022)
- NBA draft: 2022: undrafted
- Playing career: 2022–present

Career history
- 2022–2023: Lusitânia
- 2023–2024: Peja
- 2024–2025: CSO Voluntari
- 2025: Hamburg Towers
- 2025–2026: Iraklis Thessaloniki
- 2026: Bnei Herzliya
- 2026–present: Rasta Vechta

Career highlights
- ENBL champion (2025); Romanian Cup winner (2025)

Justin Edler-Davis (born February 9, 1998) is an American professional basketball player for Rasta Vechta of the Basketball Bundesliga (BBL). He played college basketball for the Cal State Bakersfield Roadrunners from 2016 until 2022.

== Professional career ==
On August 3, 2024, he joined CSO Voluntari in Romania. With the club, he won the ENBL on 2025.

On June 25, 2025, he joined Hamburg Towers in Germany. He was released from the club on November. On November 29, 2025, Edler-Davis signed a one-year contract with Iraklis of the Greek Basketball League.

On July 23, 2026, he signed with Rasta Vechta of the German Basketball Bundesliga.
