= Martin Schiller =

Austrian professional basketball coach (born 1982)

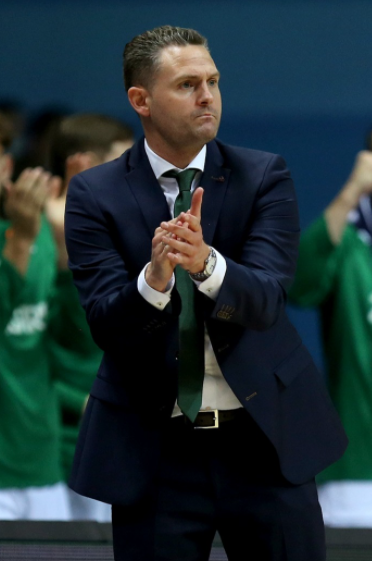
- Schiller as head coach of Žalgiris in 2020

Utah Utes
- Position: Assistant coach
- League: Big 12 Conference

Personal information
- Born: 8 March 1982 (age 44) Vienna, Austria
- Coaching career: 2005–present

Career history

Coaching
- 2004–2005: Düsseldorf
- 2005–2007: TSG Bergedorf
- 2007–2010: WBC Wels (assistant)
- 2010–2015: Artland Dragons (assistant)
- 2015–2019: Germany (assistant)
- 2015–2017: Riesen Ludwigsburg (assistant)
- 2017–2020: Salt Lake City Stars
- 2020–2021: Žalgiris Kaunas
- 2022: Casademont Zaragoza
- 2024–2025: Rasta Vechta
- 2025–present: Utah (assistant)

Career highlights
- As head coach: Lithuanian League winner (2021); Lithuanian King Mindaugas Cup winner (2021); NBA G League Coach of the Year (2020); As assistant coach: Austrian League winner (2009)

Martin Schiller (born 8 March 1982) is an Austrian professional basketball coach who is currently an assistant coach for the University of Utah.

== Coaching career ==
Schiller, the son of an Austrian father and a British mother, moved to Germany with his family when he was ten years old and then grew up in the Hamburg area, where he played basketball in the youth set up of TSG Bergedorf. He studied at the German Sport University Cologne, while coaching youth teams and working as assistant coach at 2. Bundesliga side Düsseldorf Magics. Schiller subsequently worked for WBC Wels in Austria.

From 2010 until 2015, he served as an assistant coach for the Artland Dragons, and afterwards for the Riesen Ludwigsburg of the Basketball Bundesliga (BBL). On 23 August 2017 Schiller was named the head coach of the Salt Lake City Stars of the NBA G League. Schiller has also been an assistant coach for the German national team since 2015, where he worked with Jazz assistant coach Alex Jensen.

Schiller was named the NBA G League Coach of the Year for the 2019–20 season after leading the Stars to a 30–12 record.

On 14 July 2020 Schiller was announced as the new head coach of BC Žalgiris. Under Schiller's guidance, the team won the 2021 Lithuanian championship as well as the cup title. On 8 October 2021 Schiller was fired by Žalgiris. According to the club, the decision was taken, because the team did not play "at the level that everybody wants to see". In EuroLeague play, Žalgiris had lost its first two games of the 2021–22 season, while the team was unbeaten in the LKL (4–0), when Schiller was dismissed.

He was named head coach of Casademont Zaragoza of the Spanish Liga ACB on 24 June 2022. On October 18, 2022, Schiller was fired by Zaragoza after hardly four months in the job. Schiller coached the team in the opening four games of the 2022-23 ACB season, which all ended in defeat.

In April 2024, Rasta Vechta of the German Bundesliga announced that Schiller has agreed to become their next head coach. On April 14, 2025, the Utah Utes announced the hiring of Schiller as an assistant coach to Alex Jensen.
