= 2021–22 Basketball Bundesliga =

German basketball season

Basketball Bundesliga
- Season: 2021–22
- Dates: 23 September 2021 – 19 June 2022; 6 May – 19 June 2022 (Playoffs)
- Teams: 18

Regular season
- Top seed: Alba Berlin
- Season MVP: (United States) Parker Jackson-Cartwright (Bonn)
- Relegated: ~~Skyliners Frankfurt~~; Giessen 46ers

Finals
- Champions: Alba Berlin (11th title)
- Runners-up: Bayern Munich
- Semi-finalists: Telekom Baskets Bonn; Riesen Ludwigsburg
- Finals MVP: (Germany) Johannes Thiemann (Alba)

Statistical leaders
Points	(United States) T. J. Shorts	20.6
Rebounds	(Brazil) Cristiano Felício	8.4
Assists	(United States) Parker Jackson-Cartwright	7.4

Seasons
- ← 2020–21 2022–23 →

The 2021–22 Basketball Bundesliga, known as the easyCredit BBL for sponsorship reasons, was the 56th season of the Basketball Bundesliga (BBL), the top-tier level of professional club basketball in Germany. It started on 23 September 2021 and concluded on 19 June 2022.

Alba Berlin won their third straight and eleventh overall title.

== Teams ==
Location of teams in 2020–21 Basketball Bundesliga

=== Team changes ===
Promoted from 2020–21 ProA	Relegated from 2020–21 Basketball Bundesliga
MLP Academics Heidelberg	~~Giessen 46ers~~ Rasta Vechta

As only one team was promoted, Giessen were awarded a wild card on 21 May 2021.

=== Arenas and locations ===
Team	City	Arena	Capacity
Brose Bamberg	Bamberg	Brose Arena	6,150
Medi Bayreuth	Bayreuth	Oberfrankenhalle	4,000
Alba Berlin	Berlin	Mercedes-Benz Arena	14,500
Telekom Baskets Bonn	Bonn	Telekom Dome	6,000
Löwen Braunschweig	Braunschweig	Volkswagen Halle	6,600
Niners Chemnitz	Chemnitz	Chemnitz Arena	5,200
Crailsheim Merlins	Crailsheim	Arena Hohenlohe	3,000
Skyliners Frankfurt	Frankfurt	Fraport Arena	5,002
Giessen 46ers	Giessen	Sporthalle Gießen-Ost	4,003
BG Göttingen	Göttingen	Sparkassen Arena	3,447
Hamburg Towers	Hamburg	Edel-optics.de Arena	3,400
MLP Academics Heidelberg	Heidelberg	SNP Dome	5,000
MHP Riesen Ludwigsburg	Ludwigsburg	MHP-Arena	5,300
Syntainics MBC	Weißenfels	Stadthalle Weißenfels	3,000
Bayern Munich	Munich	Audi Dome	6,700
EWE Baskets Oldenburg	Oldenburg	Große EWE Arena	6,069
ratiopharm Ulm	Ulm	ratiopharm arena	6,000
s.Oliver Würzburg	Würzburg	s.Oliver Arena	3,140

== Regular season ==
=== Standings ===
Pos	Team	Pld	W	L	PF	PA	PD	PCT	Qualification or relegation
1	Alba Berlin	33	27	6	2872	2406	+466	.818	Playoffs
2	Telekom Baskets Bonn	34	26	8	2989	2752	+237	.765	Playoffs
3	Bayern Munich	34	25	9	2771	2515	+256	.735	Playoffs
4	Riesen Ludwigsburg	34	23	11	2750	2608	+142	.676	Playoffs
5	ratiopharm Ulm	34	22	12	2811	2709	+102	.647 (Note: Ulm 158–146 Chemnitz)	Playoffs
6	Niners Chemnitz	34	22	12	2757	2658	+99	.647	Playoffs
7	Hamburg Towers	34	19	15	2897	2747	+150	.559	Playoffs
8	Brose Bamberg	34	18	16	2858	2927	−69	.529	Playoffs
9	Crailsheim Merlins	34	17	17	2875	2916	−41	.500	
10	BG Göttingen	34	16	18	2732	2803	−71	.471	
11	Baskets Oldenburg	34	14	20	2937	2948	−11	.412 (Note: Oldenburg 201–177 Würzburg)	
12	s.Oliver Würzburg	34	14	20	2810	2948	−138	.412	
13	Basketball Löwen Braunschweig	33	12	21	2743	2787	−44	.364	
14	Medi Bayreuth	34	11	23	2688	2908	−220	.324 (Note: Bayreuth 6 Pts; Heidelberg 4 Pts; Mitteldeutscher BC 2 Pts)	
15	MLP Academics Heidelberg	34	11	23	2664	2860	−196	.324	
16	Mitteldeutscher BC	34	11	23	2840	3058	−218	.324	
17	Skyliners Frankfurt (Note: Frankfurt was originally relegated, but received a wildcard for the 2022–23 season.)	34	9	25	2503	2707	−204	.265	
18	Giessen 46ers (R)	34	8	26	2705	2945	−240	.235	Relegation to ProA

Source: BBL
Rules for classification: 1) points; 2) head-to-head points; 3) head-to-head points difference; 4) head-to-head number of points scored.
(R) Relegated

=== Results ===
Home \ Away	BAM	BAY	BER	BON	BRA	CHE	CRA	FRA	GIE	GOT	HAM	HEI	LUD	MBC	MUN	OLD	ULM	WUR
Brose Bamberg	—	84–87	89–101	80–100	84–68	79–89	91–81	75–72	89–87	88–87	77–67	72–68	81–88	87–78	86–95	83–106	115–114	97–78
Medi Bayreuth	71–84	—	79–109	71–96	94–92	69–83	74–86	85–72	89–95	75–72	90–71	85–79	87–93	100–68	78–87	71–74	73–80	80–83
Alba Berlin	89–57	87–53	—	86–88	95–80	83–62	106–74	101–63	109–80	59–65	96–81	110–70	75–76	92–72	73–80	92–86	78–73	96–61
Telekom Baskets Bonn	95–81	86–65	77–89	—	89–83	76–67	101–96	86–76	78–72	78–76	80–92	87–70	97–88	115–90	96–61	78–76	76–73	87–79
Basketball Löwen Braunschweig	90–84	99–62	— (Note: The game could not be played due to the COVID-19 pandemic.)	77–95	—	84–93	84–87	67–72	71–69	101–64	79–92	82–93	80–91	101–106	82–91	94–78	76–90	80–75
Niners Chemnitz	106–94	72–86	81–64	90–68	68–77	—	82–92	87–86	82–75	87–86	85–89	67–64	74–56	91–74	77–58	79–78	78–81	88–82
Crailsheim Merlins	93–79	90–85	70–78	81–76	92–90	95–93	—	70–81	87–81	86–80	90–73	87–72	72–61	90–93	77–68	97–86	71–93	111–84
Skyliners Frankfurt	72–77	82–70	56–72	96–112	76–89	78–82	80–73	—	75–76	65–73	64–74	87–82	71–80	68–89	50–79	103–110	58–61	61–69
Giessen 46ers	89–92	86–74	58–84	95–103	66–82	70–91	70–104	79–90	—	76–87	100–73	68–75	59–76	100–81	85–95	88–75	76–87	97–110
BG Göttingen	76–82	92–91	86–92	90–81	85–93	90–69	83–76	76–72	87–90	—	83–80	70–82	78–69	91–90	66–80	95–85	91–87	76–89
Hamburg Towers	75–87	77–70	80–88	73–85	103–92	82–90	113–63	68–58	104–82	83–46	—	81–75	75–79	84–76	87–83	101–85	90–91	113–103
MLP Academics Heidelberg	81–94	87–89	81–83	71–82	81–78	66–81	100–91	71–65	95–81	80–96	76–100	—	73–67	94–70	70–92	90–95	79–84	76–71
Riesen Ludwigsburg	95–76	87–67	74–62	91–86	90–72	74–76	77–75	95–67	96–87	86–79	88–87	98–83	—	77–75	58–77	86–102	74–61	83–68
Mitteldeutscher BC	86–98	105–81	66–95	85–90	91–79	89–96	116–111	81–75	91–89	93–83	57–101	74–85	80–88	—	68–82	87–82	75–89	95–73
Bayern Munich	83–62	83–60	78–83	100–81	96–80	63–65	93–64	72–53	71–64	87–64	86–75	77–71	79–78	86–78	—	93–80	83–86	92–57
Baskets Oldenburg	87–71	95–111	74–92	65–89	90–76	92–87	82–79	69–88	72–75	86–85	77–79	109–73	57–79	110–93	106–75	—	89–96	113–87
ratiopharm Ulm	83–94	92–81	66–71	74–85	59–78	77–68	100–90	80–88	88–71	86–88	78–74	90–74	78–66	83–82	65–77	86–78	—	92–86
s.Oliver Würzburg	90–89	80–88	70–82	93–90	86–87	81–71	91–74	78–83	82–69	79–86	88–100	97–77	92–86	92–86	90–70	90–88	76–88	—

Updated to match(es) played on 10 May 2022. Source: BBL
Legend: Blue = home team win; Red = away team win.
Matches with lighter background shading were decided after overtime.

== Playoffs ==
All three rounds of the playoffs were played in a best-of-five format, with the higher seeded team playing the first, third and fifth game at home.

Quarterfinals
1	Alba Berlin	3
8	Brose Bamberg	0
4	Riesen Ludwigsburg	3
5	ratiopharm Ulm	0
2	Telekom Baskets Bonn	3
7	Hamburg Towers	0
3	Bayern Munich	3
6	Niners Chemnitz	0

Semifinals
1	Alba Berlin	3
4	Riesen Ludwigsburg	0
2	Telekom Baskets Bonn	2
3	Bayern Munich	3

Finals
1	Alba Berlin	3
3	Bayern Munich	1

== Awards and statistics ==
=== Major award winners ===
The awards were announced on 21 and 28 April 2022.

Award	Player	Club
Most Valuable Player	(United States) Parker Jackson-Cartwright	Telekom Baskets Bonn
Finals MVP	(Germany) Johannes Thiemann	Alba Berlin
Top Scorer	(United States) T. J. Shorts	Crailsheim Merlins
Best Offensive Player	(United States) T. J. Shorts	Crailsheim Merlins
Best Defender	(United States) Justin Simon	Riesen Ludwigsburg
Most Effective Player International	(United States) Parker Jackson-Cartwright	Telekom Baskets Bonn
Most Effective Player National	(Germany) Christian Sengfelder	Brose Bamberg
Best German Young Player	(Germany) Justus Hollatz	Hamburg Towers
Coach of the Year	(Finland) Tuomas Iisalo	Telekom Baskets Bonn

=== Statistical leaders ===
Category	Player	Club	Average
Points per game	(United States) T. J. Shorts	Crailsheim Merlins	20.6
Rebounds per game	(Brazil) Cristiano Felício	ratiopharm Ulm	8.4
Assists per game	(United States) Parker Jackson-Cartwright	Telekom Baskets Bonn	7.4
Steals per game	(United States) Kendale McCullum	Giessen 46ers	2.4
Blocks per game	(United States) Tai Odiase	Baskets Oldenburg	1.4
Efficiency per game	(United States) T. J. Shorts	Crailsheim Merlins	22.3

== German clubs in European competitions ==
Team	Competition	Result
Bayern Munich	EuroLeague	Playoffs
Alba Berlin	EuroLeague	Regular season
ratiopharm Ulm	EuroCup	Quarterfinals
Hamburg Towers	EuroCup	Eightfinals
Riesen Ludwigsburg	Champions League	Third place
Baskets Oldenburg	Champions League	Regular season
Brose Bamberg	Champions League	Qualifying
Crailsheim Merlins	FIBA Europe Cup	Quarterfinals
Medi Bayreuth	FIBA Europe Cup	Second round
