= Johannes Thiemann =

German basketball player (born 1994)

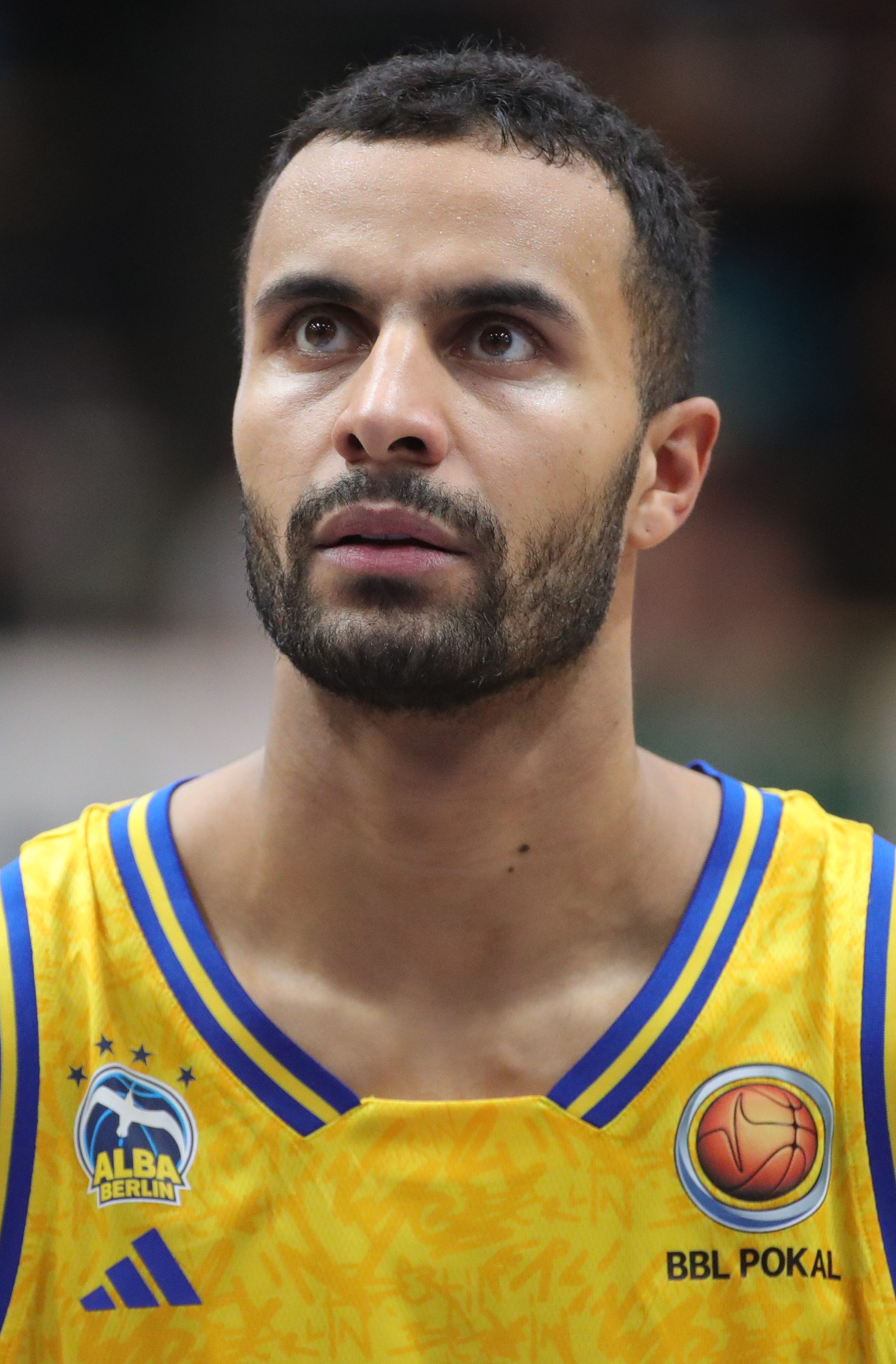
- Thiemann with Alba Berlin in 2023

No. 32 – Bayern Munich
- Position: Power forward / center
- League: BBL; EuroLeague

Personal information
- Born: 9 February 1994 (age 32) Trier, Germany
- Listed height: 2.05 m (6 ft 9 in)
- Listed weight: 110 kg (243 lb)

Career information
- Playing career: 2015–present

Career history
- 2013–2016: Brose Bamberg
- 2014–2016: →Baunach Young Pikes
- 2016–2018: Riesen Ludwigsburg
- 2018–2024: Alba Berlin
- 2024–2026: Gunma Crane Thunders
- 2026–present: Bayern Munich

Career highlights
- 5× Bundesliga champion (2015, 2016, 2020–2022); Bundesliga Finals MVP (2022); All-Bundesliga Second Team (2024); 2× German Cup winner (2020, 2022); 2× BBL All-Star (2017, 2018); ProA Young Player of the Year (2016)
Medals
Men's basketball
Representing Germany
FIBA World Cup
Gold medal – first place	2023 Philippines–Japan–Indonesia
EuroBasket
Gold medal – first place	2025 Cyprus–Finland–Poland–Latvia
Bronze medal – third place	2022 Czech Republic–Georgia–Italy–Germany

Johannes Thiemann (born 9 February 1994) is a German professional basketball player for Bayern Munich of the German Basketball Bundesliga (BBL) and the EuroLeague.

== Professional career ==
=== Riesen Ludwigsburg (2016–2018) ===
On 3 June 2016 Thiemann signed a two-year deal with MHP Riesen Ludwigsburg.

=== Alba Berlin (2018–2024) ===
During the 2020–21 season, he averaged 7.7 points and 3.8 rebounds per game with Alba Berlin. Thiemann re-signed a three-year deal with the team on 21 June 2021. On 13 July 2024 Thiemann parted ways with Alba after six years.

=== Bayern Munich (2026–present) ===
On June 26, 2026, Thiemann signed a two-year contract with Bayern Munich of the German Basketball Bundesliga (BBL).

== International career ==
In 2016, Thiemann was selected for the German national basketball team, to play in the qualification rounds for the EuroBasket 2017. Thiemann played with Germany at the 2020 Summer Olympics in Tokyo. He averaged 6.5 points per game and helped his country reach the quarterfinals. He won the 2023 FIBA World Cup with the German national basketball team.

== Career statistics ==
Legend
GP	Games played	GS	Games started	MPG	Minutes per game
FG%	Field-goal percentage	3P%	3-point field-goal percentage	FT%	Free-throw percentage
RPG	Rebounds per game	APG	Assists per game	SPG	Steals per game
BPG	Blocks per game	PPG	Points per game	PIR	Performance index rating
**Bold**	Career high

=== EuroLeague ===
Year	Team	GP	GS	MPG	FG%	3P%	FT%	RPG	APG	SPG	BPG	PPG	PIR
2019–20	Alba Berlin	16	3	14.2	**.547**	**.538**	.750	3.1	.8	.3	—	6.1	7.1
2020–21	Alba Berlin	**31**	9	18.9	.448	.377	**.800**	3.8	1.5	.7	—	7.7	9.4
2021–22	Alba Berlin	23	9	18.6	.469	.308	.600	3.5	1.7	.6	—	6.9	8.2
2022–23	Alba Berlin	28	4	17.8	.473	.231	.795	4.1	1.3	.5	**.1**	8.0	10.6
2023–24	Alba Berlin	29	**24**	**25.0**	.484	.344	.786	**5.2**	**1.9**	**.9**	**.1**	**12.7**	**16.4**
Career		127	49	19.4	.476	.338	.761	4.1	1.5	.6	.0	8.6	10.8

=== EuroCup ===
Year	Team	GP	GS	MPG	FG%	3P%	FT%	RPG	APG	SPG	BPG	PPG	PIR
2013–14	Bamberg	1	0	1.0	—	—	—	—	—	—	—	0.0	-1.0
2014–15	Bamberg	2	0	2.0	—	—	—	—	—	—	—	0.0	0.0
2018–19	Alba Berlin	**20**	0	**12.5**	**.554**	**.200**	**.717**	**2.2**	**.3**	**.7**	.1'	**5.1**	**5.0**
Career		22	0	11.5	.554	.200	.717	2.0	.3	.6	.0	4.6	4.5

=== Basketball Champions League ===
Year	Team	GP	GS	MPG	FG%	3P%	FT%	RPG	APG	SPG	BPG	PPG
2016–17	Riesen Ludwigsburg	**20**	**18**	17.3	.547	.400	.753	4.3	.3	**.5**	**.2**	9.4
2019–20	Riesen Ludwigsburg	12	12	**18.6**	**.554**	**.600**	**.760**	**5.4**	**.5**	.3	.1	**11.1**
Career		32	30	17.8	.550	.500	.756	4.7	.4	.4	.2	10.0

=== Domestic leagues ===
Year	Team	League	GP	MPG	FG%	3P%	FT%	RPG	APG	SPG	BPG	PPG
2011–12	(Germany) Breitengüßbach	ProB	4	10.0	.308	—	.500	4.3	.3	—	—	2.5
2012–13	(Germany) Breitengüßbach	ProB	16	19.3	.604	—	.534	5.6	.7	.8	.3	8.8
2013–14	(Germany) Bamberg	BBL	6	2.7	.000	—	.000	.5	.3	.2	—	0.0
2014–15	(Germany) Baunach	ProA	27	21.8	.475	.333	.664	5.7	.6	.5	.3	9.5
2014–15	(Germany) Bamberg	BBL	5	2.8	—	—	—	—	—	.2	—	0.0
2015–16	(Germany) Baunach	ProA	27	32.2	.546	.313	.637	9.5	1.9	.8	.3	15.1
2016–17	(Germany) Riesen Ludwigsburg	BBL	37	16.4	.505	.286	.716	4.8	.3	.7	.3	8.3
2017–18	(Germany) Riesen Ludwigsburg	BBL	19	16.8	.517	.400	.656	4.0	.8	.5	.1	10.4
2018–19	(Germany) Alba Berlin	BBL	40	15.2	.627	.500	.710	4.0	.6	.6	.1	8.3
2019–20	(Germany) Alba Berlin	BBL	18	15.5	.529	.200	.784	4.9	.6	.4	.1	6.8
2020–21	(Germany) Alba Berlin	BBL	36	17.1	.542	.326	.759	4.1	1.2	.7	.1	7.5
2021–22	(Germany) Alba Berlin	BBL	36	16.8	.524	.296	.829	4.2	1.9	.7	.1	8.6
2022–23	(Germany) Alba Berlin	BBL	33	17.1	.600	.302	.833	4.3	2.3	.6	.1	9.7
2023–24	(Germany) Alba Berlin	BBL	32	20.2	.517	.208	.829	4.4	1.8	.8	.2	12.1

== Personal life ==
Thiemann was born in Germany to a Cameroonian father and German mother.
