= Charles Jackson (basketball) =

American basketball player (born 1993)

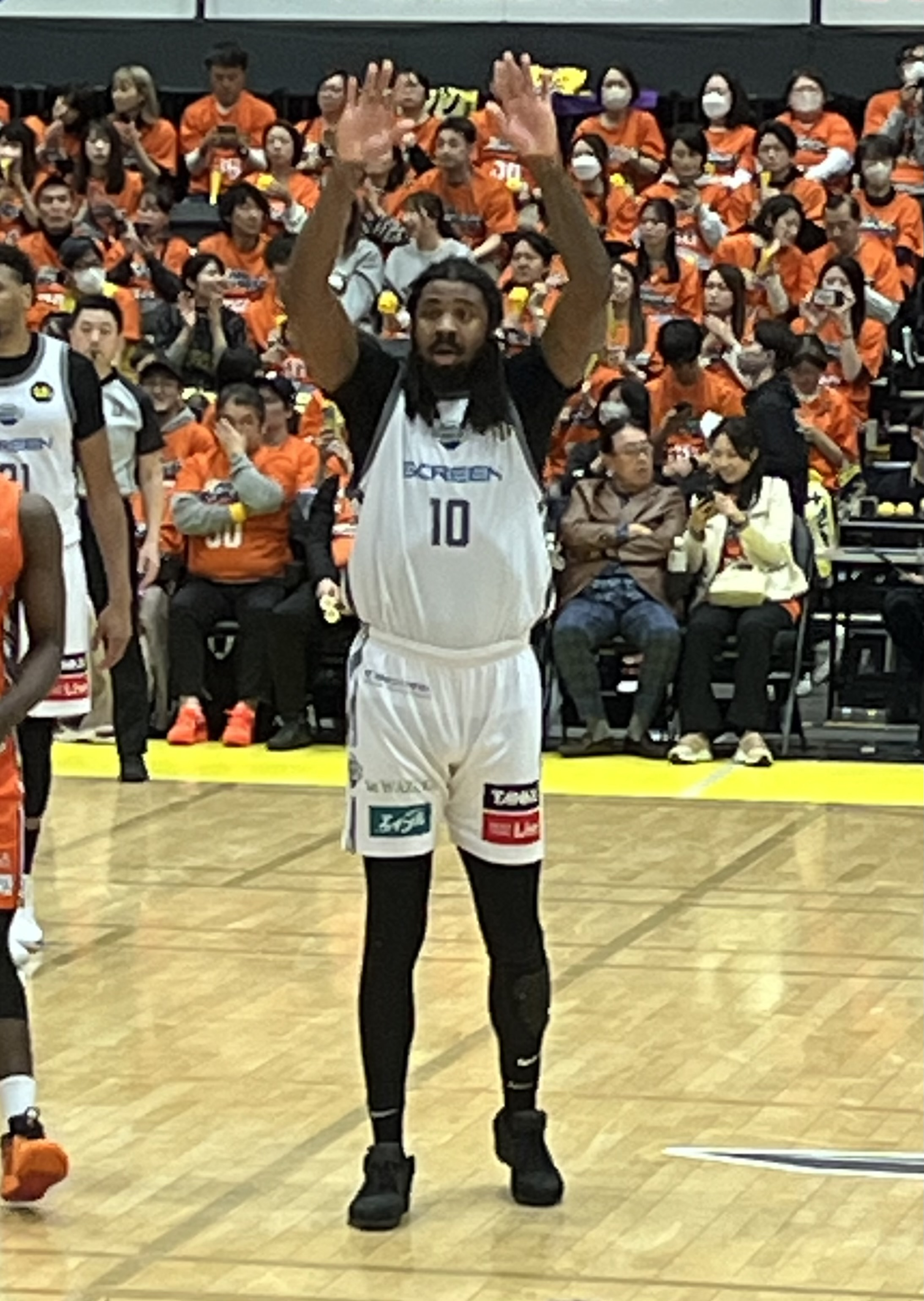

No. 10 – Kyoto Hannaryz
- Position: Center
- League: B.League

Personal information
- Born: May 22, 1993 (age 33)
- Listed height: 6 ft 10 in (2.08 m)
- Listed weight: 225 lb (102 kg)

Career information
- High school: Grant Union (Sacramento, California)
- College: Lassen (2012–2013); College of Southern Idaho (2013–2014); Tennessee Tech (2014–2015)
- NBA draft: 2015: undrafted
- Playing career: 2015–present

Career history
- 2015–2016: New Zealand Breakers
- 2016: Wellington Saints
- 2016: Delaware 87ers
- 2016–2018: Sakarya BB
- 2018–2019: Baskets Bonn
- 2019–2021: Sun Rockers Shibuya
- 2021–2022: Hiroshima Dragonflies
- 2022–2023: Yokohama B-Corsairs
- 2023–present: Kyoto Hannaryz

Career highlights
- OVC All-Newcomer Team (2015)

Charles Edward Jackson (born May 22, 1993) is an American professional basketball player for the Kyoto Hannaryz of the B.League in Japan. He attended Grant Union High School in Sacramento, California before attending and competing for three different colleges.

== College career ==
Jackson was a standout freshman center at Lassen College in 2012–13, averaging 11.4 rebounds and 2.5 blocks per game. He also averaged 12.2 points and tallied 21 double-doubles. As a sophomore, Jackson moved to the College of Southern Idaho. He managed just 16 games in 2013–14 after recovering from a broken leg earlier in the season. He averaged 5.8 points and 5.6 rebounds in limited action, appearing in just 17.8 minutes per game.

As a junior in 2014–15, Jackson played Division I college basketball for the Tennessee Tech Golden Eagles. In 30 games (all starts), he averaged 13.0 points, 9.5 rebounds, 1.1 steals and 1.3 blocks per game. He subsequently earned OVC All-Newcomer Team honors.

On April 24, 2015, Jackson declared for the NBA draft, forgoing his final year of college eligibility.

== Professional career ==
=== New Zealand (2015–2016) ===
After going undrafted in the 2015 NBA draft, Jackson joined the Philadelphia 76ers for the 2015 NBA Summer League where he averaged 7.5 points and six rebounds in four games.

On August 10, 2015, Jackson signed with the New Zealand Breakers for the 2015–16 NBL season. In his debut game for the Breakers in the team's season opener on October 7, he came off the bench to record 12 points and seven rebounds in a loss to the Adelaide 36ers. On December 5, he scored a season-high 22 points in an 86–75 win over the Townsville Crocodiles. On January 17, 2016, he recorded 11 points and 18 rebounds in a 103–96 double overtime loss to the Illawarra Hawks, fouling out in the second overtime. Of his 18 rebounds, 10 of them were offensive, becoming the first player in Breakers' history to grab 10 offensive rebounds in a game, and the first player in the NBL to record that mark since Rosell Ellis did so in January 2007. The Breakers finished the regular season in fourth place with a 16–12 win/loss record. In the playoffs, the Breakers defeated first-placed Melbourne United in the semi-finals with a 2–0 sweep, moving on to their fifth Grand Final appearance in six years. There they faced their arch rivals the Perth Wildcats in a best-of-three series where they lost Game 1 in Perth 82–76, fought out a Game 2 72–68 win in Auckland to level the series, and then lost Game 3 in Perth 75–52. Jackson appeared in all 33 games for the Breakers in 2015–16, averaging 10.3 points, 7.7 rebounds and 1.1 blocks per game.

On March 9, 2016, Jackson signed a short-term, two-game deal with the Wellington Saints. He appeared in both of the Saints' Round 1 games, scoring a total of 26 points and helping the team claim a 2–0 start to the season.

=== Delaware 87ers (2016) ===
On March 18, 2016, Jackson was acquired by the Delaware 87ers of the NBA Development League. He spent the rest of the 2015–16 D-League season with Delaware, playing in six games and averaging 7.2 points, 7.8 rebounds, 1.0 steals and 1.2 blocks in 21.8 minutes per game. In just his second game for the 87ers, he had a 13-rebound performance, and over his final three games, he scored 10 points in all three. In the season finale on April 1 against the Westchester Knicks, Jackson recorded a double-double with 10 points and 11 rebounds.

=== Europe (2016–2019) ===
On August 7, 2016, Jackson signed with Sakarya BB of Turkey. On October 1, he made his debut for Sakarya BB in a 59–55 win over Düzce Belediyesi, recording two points, five rebounds, one steal and one block in 12 minutes off the bench.

On June 26, 2018, Jackson signed with Telekom Baskets Bonn of the German Basketball Bundesliga (BBL).

=== Japan (since 2019) ===
In 2019, Jackson signed with Sun Rockers Shibuya of the Japanese B.League.
