= Seth Hinrichs =

American-German basketball player

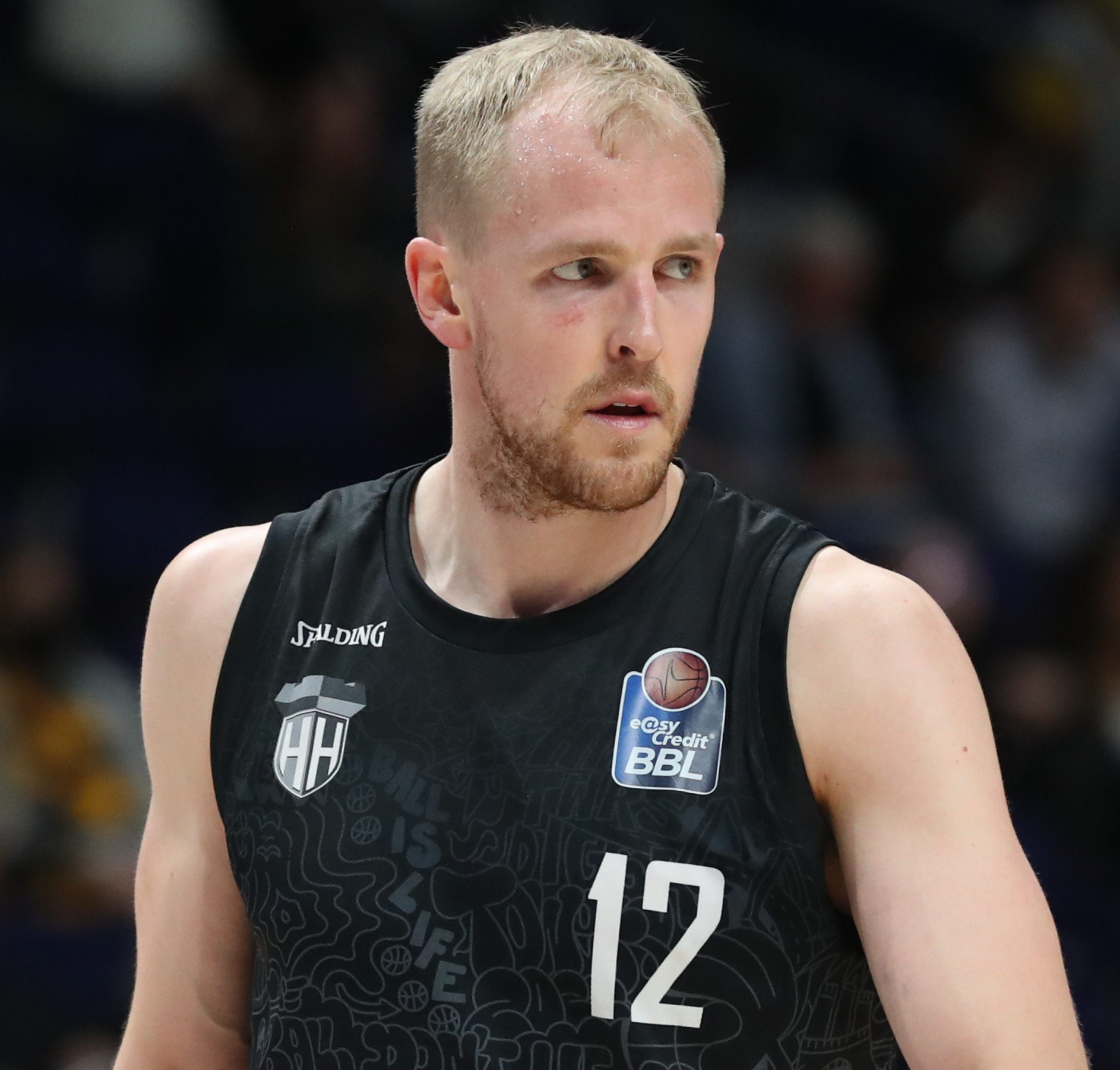
- Hinrichs with Hamburg Towers in 2022

No. 21 – Oldenburg
- Position: Small forward
- League: Basketball Bundesliga

Personal information
- Born: 24 March 1993 (age 33) Clara City, Minnesota, United States
- Listed height: 2.01 m (6 ft 7 in)
- Listed weight: 100 kg (220 lb)

Career information
- College: Lafayette College (2011–2015)
- Playing career: 2015–present

Career history
- 2015–2016: FC Porto
- 2016–2017: Kirchheim Knights
- 2017–2019: Rasta Vechta
- 2019–2020: Ratiopharm Ulm
- 2020–2021: Bàsquet Manresa
- 2021–2024: Hamburg Towers
- 2024–present: Baskets Oldenburg

Career highlights
- Portuguese Basketball League Cup winner (2016); ProA Player of the Year (2018)

Seth Hinrichs (born March 24, 1993) is an American-German professional basketball player for Baskets Oldenburg of the Basketball Bundesliga (BBL). He plays as a small forward and is known for his three-point shooting, rebounding, and team leadership.

== Early life and college career ==
Hinrichs was born in Clara City, Minnesota. He played high school basketball at Maccray High School before committing to Lafayette College in Pennsylvania. At Lafayette, he played four seasons (2011–2015), appearing in 119 games and scoring a total of 209 three-pointers. He averaged 12.9 points and 4.8 rebounds per game and served as team captain.

== Professional career ==
Hinrichs began his professional career with Portuguese top-division club FC Porto in 2015, where he also competed in the FIBA Europe Cup.

In 2016, he participated in a tryout with the German Bundesliga team MHP Riesen Ludwigsburg but was not signed. Instead, he joined Kirchheim Knights in Germany's second division (ProA).

In 2017, Hinrichs moved to SC Rasta Vechta, where he led the team to the ProA championship in 2018 and promotion to the Bundesliga. He was named the 2018 ProA Player of the Year after averaging 13.8 points, 6.4 rebounds, and 2.7 assists per game in 39 appearances.

Hinrichs remained with Vechta in the Bundesliga and helped the team reach the semifinals in the 2018–2019 season. He averaged 12.8 points and 5.3 rebounds per game, leading the team in rebounding and ranking third in scoring.

In 2019, Hinrichs signed with Ratiopharm Ulm, where he played the 2019–2020 season. He then moved to Spain in 2020 to play for Bàsquet Manresa in the Liga ACB. There, he averaged 7.8 points and 5.3 rebounds across 36 league games.

He returned to Germany in 2021, signing with the Hamburg Towers, where he reunited with head coach Pedro Calles, under whom he had played in Vechta. In 2024, Hinrichs followed Calles again and signed with EWE Baskets Oldenburg.

== Personal life ==
Hinrichs has German ancestry, with forebears who emigrated from Germany to the United States in 1882. He holds a degree in economics from Lafayette College.
