= 2018–19 Basketball Bundesliga =

Professional basketball club in Germany

Basketball Bundesliga
- Season: 2018–19
- Dates: 28 September 2018 – June 2019
- Games played: 306
- Teams: 18

Regular season
- EuroLeague: Bayern Munich; Alba Berlin
- Season MVP: (United States) Will Cummings
- Relegated: Eisbären Bremerhaven; Science City Jena

Finals
- Champions: Bayern Munich (5th title)
- Runners-up: Alba Berlin
- Semifinalists: EWE Baskets Oldenburg; Rasta Vechta
- Finals MVP: (Bosnia and Herzegovina) Nihad Đedović

Statistical leaders
Points	(United States) Will Cummings	20.5
Rebounds	(United States) John Bryant	10.2
Assists	(United States) T.J. Bray	7.9

Records
- Attendance: 1,281,826
- Average attendance: 4,189

Seasons
- ← 2017–18 2019–20 →

The 2018–19 Basketball Bundesliga, known as the easyCredit BBL for sponsorship reasons, was the 53rd season of the Basketball Bundesliga (BBL), the top-tier level of professional club basketball in Germany.

Bayern Munich defended their title by defeating Alba Berlin in the finals.

Alba Berlin, runners-up of the season, qualified for the 2019–20 EuroLeague as Bayern Munich was already given a wild card.

== Teams ==
Location of teams in 2018–19 Basketball Bundesliga

=== Team changes ===
Promoted from 2017–18 ProA	Relegated from 2017–18 Basketball Bundesliga
Crailsheim Merlins; Rasta Vechta	Rockets; Tigers Tübingen

=== Arenas and locations ===
Team	City	Arena	Capacity
Alba Berlin	Berlin	Mercedes-Benz Arena	14,500
Brose Bamberg	Bamberg	Brose Arena	6,150
Crailsheim Merlins	Crailsheim	Arena Hohenlohe	3,000
medi Bayreuth	Bayreuth	Oberfrankenhalle	4,000
Telekom Baskets Bonn	Bonn	Telekom Dome	6,000
Löwen Braunschweig	Braunschweig	Volkswagen Halle	6,600
Eisbären Bremerhaven	Bremerhaven	Bremerhaven Stadthalle	4,050
Fraport Skyliners	Frankfurt	Fraport Arena	5,002
Gießen 46ers	Gießen	Sporthalle Gießen-Ost	4,003
BG Göttingen	Göttingen	Sparkassen Arena	3,447
Science City Jena	Jena	Sparkassen-Arena	3,000
MHP Riesen Ludwigsburg	Ludwigsburg	MHP-Arena	5,300
Mitteldeutscher BC	Weißenfels	Stadthalle Weißenfels	3,000
Bayern Munich	Munich	Audi Dome	6,700
EWE Baskets Oldenburg	Oldenburg	Große EWE Arena	6,069
Rasta Vechta	Vechta	Rasta Dome	3,140
ratiopharm Ulm	Ulm	Arena Ulm/Neu-Ulm	6,000
s.Oliver Würzburg	Würzburg	s.Oliver Arena	3,140

=== Personnel and sponsorship ===
Team	Head coach	Kit manufacturer	Shirt sponsor
Alba Berlin	(Spain) Aíto García Reneses	Adidas	ALBA SE
Bayern Munich	(Montenegro) Dejan Radonjić	Adidas	BayWa
BG Göttingen	(Netherlands) Johan Roijakkers	Nike	Satorius
Brose Bamberg	(Italy) Federico Perego	Macron	Brose
Crailsheim Merlins	(Finland) Tuomas Iisalo	–	Hakro
Eisbären Bremerhaven	(Germany) Arne Woltmann	Owayo	BLG Logistics
EWE Baskets Oldenburg	(Germany) Mladen Drijenčić	Owayo	EWE
Fraport Skyliners	(Canada) Gordon Herbert	Peak	Fraport
Gießen 46ers	(Germany) Ingo Freyer	K1x	Rovema
Löwen Braunschweig	(Germany) Frank Menz	Spalding	hey car
medi Bayreuth	(Austria) Raoul Korner	K1x	Medi
MHP Riesen Ludwigsburg	(United States) John Patrick	Macron	Mieschke Hofmann und Partner
Mitteldeutscher BC	(Croatia) Silvano Poropat	K1x	Puraglobe
Rasta Vechta	(Spain) Pedro Calles	Spalding	Rasta
ratiopharm Ulm	(Germany) Thorsten Leibenath	Nike	Ratiopharm
s.Oliver Würzburg	(Germany) Denis Wucherer	K1x	s.Oliver
Science City Jena	(Lithuania) Marius Linartas	Spalding	Science City
Telekom Baskets Bonn	(Bosnia and Herzegovina) Predrag Krunić	Spalding	Deutsche Telekom

=== Managerial changes ===
Team	Outgoing manager	Manner of departure	Date of vacancy	Position in table	Replaced with	Date of appointment
Mitteldeutscher BC	(Serbia) Igor Jovović	End of contract	1 June 2018	Pre-season	(Croatia) Aleksandar Šćepanović	14 June 2018
Brose Bamberg	(Italy) Luca Banchi	End of contract	15 June 2018	Pre-season	(Latvia) Ainars Bagatskis	30 June 2018

== Regular season ==
In the regular season, teams play against each other two times home-and-away in a round-robin format. The first eight teams advance to the playoffs, while the last two placed teams will be relegated to the ProA for next season.

=== League table ===
Pos	Team	Pld	W	L	PF	PA	PD	Pts	Qualification or relegation
1	Bayern Munich	34	31	3	3019	2598	+421	62	Qualification for playoffs
2	EWE Baskets Oldenburg	34	28	6	3157	2782	+375	56	Qualification for playoffs
3	Alba Berlin	34	27	7	3125	2742	+383	54	Qualification for playoffs
4	Rasta Vechta	34	24	10	2978	2809	+169	48	Qualification for playoffs
5	Brose Bamberg	34	22	12	3010	2880	+130	44	Qualification for playoffs
6	ratiopharm Ulm	34	20	14	2975	2896	+79	40	Qualification for playoffs
7	Telekom Baskets Bonn	34	18	16	2932	2955	−23	36	Qualification for playoffs
8	Basketball Löwen Braunschweig	34	17	17	2890	2853	+37	34 (Note: Braunschweig 165–149 Würzburg)	Qualification for playoffs
9	s.Oliver Würzburg	34	17	17	2773	2822	−49	34	
10	MHP Riesen Ludwigsburg	34	16	18	2880	2899	−19	32 (Note: Ludwigsburg 170–170 Frankfurt)	
11	Skyliners Frankfurt	34	16	18	2688	2794	−106	32	
12	Medi Bayreuth	34	14	20	2897	2978	−81	28	
13	Gießen 46ers	34	13	21	3065	3192	−127	26	
14	BG Göttingen	34	11	23	2699	2828	−129	22	
15	Mitteldeutscher BC	34	10	24	2879	3053	−174	20	
16	Crailsheim Merlins	34	9	25	2829	3091	−262	18	
17	Eisbären Bremerhaven (R)	34	8	26	2746	2969	−223	16	Relegation to ProA
18	Science City Jena (R)	34	5	29	2640	3039	−399	10	Relegation to ProA

Source: BBL
Rules for classification: 1) points; 2) head-to-head points; 3) head-to-head points difference; 4) head-to-head number of points scored.
(R) Relegated

=== Results ===
Home \ Away	BAM	BAY	BER	BON	BRA	BRE	CRA	FRA	GIE	GOT	JEN	LUD	MBC	MUN	OLD	ULM	VEC	WUR
Brose Bamberg	—	84–94	66–69	77–70	93–88	100–74	101–92	74–73	109–101 (OT)	100–77	99–67	93–91 (OT)	88–73	75–80	86–93	103–94	67–85	97–65
Medi Bayreuth	79–90	—	80–79	84–78 (OT)	78–77	113–85	102–85	72–76	95–80	75–78	103–78	81–109	95–92	90–93	70–90	79–88	81–86	84–99
Alba Berlin	92–88	86–68	—	110–98	82–74	107–104 (OT)	115–76	87–74	108–96	95–68	112–55	86–80	92–84	75–85	78–94	92–81	104–67	108–69
Telekom Baskets Bonn	92–81	94–84	81–93	—	75–69	108–75	89–87	60–71	97–105	76–68	93–87	86–62	105–98	102–98	78–98	78–76	87–92 (OT)	91–86
Basketball Löwen Braunschweig	92–66	100–85	83–79	86–92	—	83–81	98–84	95–77	105–101	90–76	90–66	100–99 (OT)	75–63	61–87	64–100	82–77	85–88	87–78
Eisbären Bremerhaven	88–93	83–75	86–94	88–67	69–87	—	93–80	78–80	92–101	108–90 (OT)	76–74	81–75	76–81	72–89	83–88	78–88	77–84	85–87
Crailsheim Merlins	77–93	97–90	69–105	87–88	99–94 (OT)	86–80	—	69–77	90–92	63–88	101–78	85–94	70–89	71–96	99–87	79–82	68–70	69–87
Skyliners Frankfurt	86–79	81–91	86–99	83–79	82–77	84–77	77–91	—	82–81	64–72	83–69	94–96	93–88	87–91 (2 OT)	75–74	63–91	80–100	77–91
Gießen 46ers	90–97	90–95	96–101	92–99	99–97	87–89	114–115	91–90	—	85–104	89–83	93–98	91–84	76–99	97–88	99–90	83–84	84–101
BG Göttingen	77–78	80–89	91–85	79–86	76–80	85–79	93–80	70–81	95–98	—	81–88	86–80	78–92	71–84	79–96	76–82	79–82	91–87
Science City Jena	85–90	89–96	77–81	82–70	85–83	87–98 (OT)	88–91	72–78	61–81	92–93	—	89–91 (OT)	81–64	66–82	80–83	80–85	76–89	78–82
MHP Riesen Ludwigsburg	96–95	100–82	79–80	78–83	94–104	75–58	82–70	83–76	83–68	62–52	86–74	—	93–86	75–91	67–85	92–98	102–98	75–80
Mitteldeutscher BC	89–96	108–90	91–102	80–78	84–81	90–87	82–87	89–95 (OT)	86–83	63–105	109–92	77–76	—	66–81	74–89	81–94	100–106 (OT)	84–97
Bayern Munich	85–78	101–95 (OT)	83–81	102–91	84–73	91–80	99–79	80–71	94–79	80–68	103–71	92–74	92–67	—	95–74	95–72	79–66	87–69
EWE Baskets Oldenburg	100–89	90–81	84–93	109–95	103–89	99–76	87–79	91–69	117–85	86–70	103–62	100–71	118–115 (OT)	83–82	—	103–99 (2OT)	81–62	109–93
ratiopharm Ulm	91–100	92–69	74–92	95–86	93–84	78–69	99–87	82–72	91–92	86–74	90–97	82–91	105–94	77–83	69–82	—	98–94	95–94 (OT)
Rasta Vechta	95–101 (OT)	67–83	80–69	112–117 (2OT)	87–79	85–64	95–92	83–88 (OT)	92–81	82–60	104–66	112–92	89–79	93–75	100–85	80–81	—	75–65
s.Oliver Würzburg	80–84	73–69	75–94	80–75	71–78	80–71	87–75	72–63	81–85	88–71	80–65	82–79	84–77	70–81	78–88	77–99	88–92	—

Source: BBL
Legend: Blue = home team win; Red = away team win.

== Playoffs ==
All three rounds of the playoffs are played in a best-of-five format, with the higher seeded team playing the first, third and fifth game at home.

Quarterfinals
1	Bayern Munich	3
8	Löwen Braunschweig	0
4	Rasta Vechta	3
5	Brose Bamberg	1
2	EWE Baskets Oldenburg	3
7	Telekom Baskets Bonn	0
3	Alba Berlin	3
6	ratiopharm Ulm	0

Semifinals
1	Bayern Munich	3
4	Rasta Vechta	0
2	EWE Baskets Oldenburg	0
3	Alba Berlin	3

Finals
1	Bayern Munich	3
3	Alba Berlin	0

== Awards and statistics ==
=== Major award winners ===
Award	Player	Club
Most Valuable Player	(United States) Will Cummings	EWE Baskets Oldenburg
Finals MVP	(Bosnia and Herzegovina) Nihad Đedović	Bayern Munich
Top Scorer	(United States) Will Cummings	EWE Baskets Oldenburg
Best Offensive Player	(United States) John Bryant	Gießen 46ers
Best Defender	(Cuba) Yorman Polas Bartolo	Telekom Baskets Bonn
Most Effective Player	(United States) John Bryant	Gießen 46ers
Best German Young Player	(Germany) Franz Wagner	Alba Berlin
Coach of the Year	(Spain) Pedro Calles	Rasta Vechta

=== Statistical leaders ===
Category	Player	Club	Average
Points	(United States) Will Cummings	EWE Baskets Oldenburg	20.5
Rebounds	(United States) John Bryant	Gießen 46ers	10.2
Assists	(United States) T.J. Bray	Rasta Vechta	7.9
Steals	(Montenegro) Javonte Green	ratiopharm Ulm	2.3
Blocks	(United States) Keith Benson	Eisbären Bremerhaven	1.2
Efficiency	(United States) John Bryant	Gießen 46ers	25.7

== German clubs in European competitions ==
Team	Competition	Progress
Bayern Munich	EuroLeague	11th qualified
ALBA Berlin	EuroCup	Runners-up
Fraport Skyliners	EuroCup	Top 16
ratiopharm Ulm	EuroCup	Top 16
Brose Bamberg	Champions League	Fourth place
medi Bayreuth	Champions League	Regular season
MHP Riesen Ludwigsburg	Champions League	Regular season
Telekom Baskets Bonn	Champions League	Regular season
Telekom Baskets Bonn	FIBA Europe Cup	Round of 16
s.Oliver Würzburg	FIBA Europe Cup	Runners-up

== See also ==
- 2018–19 BBL-Pokal
