= SC Rasta Vechta =

Rasta Vechta
- Leagues: BBL; BCL
- Founded: 26 June 1979; 47 years ago
- History: SC Rasta Vechta; 1979–present
- Arena: Rasta Dome
- Capacity: 3,140
- Location: Vechta, Germany
- Team colors: Orange, white
- Main sponsor: Miavit
- President: Stefan Niemeyer
- Head coach: Christian Held
- 2025–26 position: Basketball Bundesliga, 7th of 18
- Championships: 3 ProA
- Website: rasta-vechta.de
Home	Away	Third

Sportclub Rasta Vechta is a professional basketball club based in Vechta, Germany. Founded in 1979, the club has spent the majority of its history in the lower-tier German leagues. In 2012, the team was promoted to the second-tier ProA, and following their promotion from the ProA in the 2022–23 season, Rast Vechta now plays in the Basketball Bundesliga (BBL), the first tier.

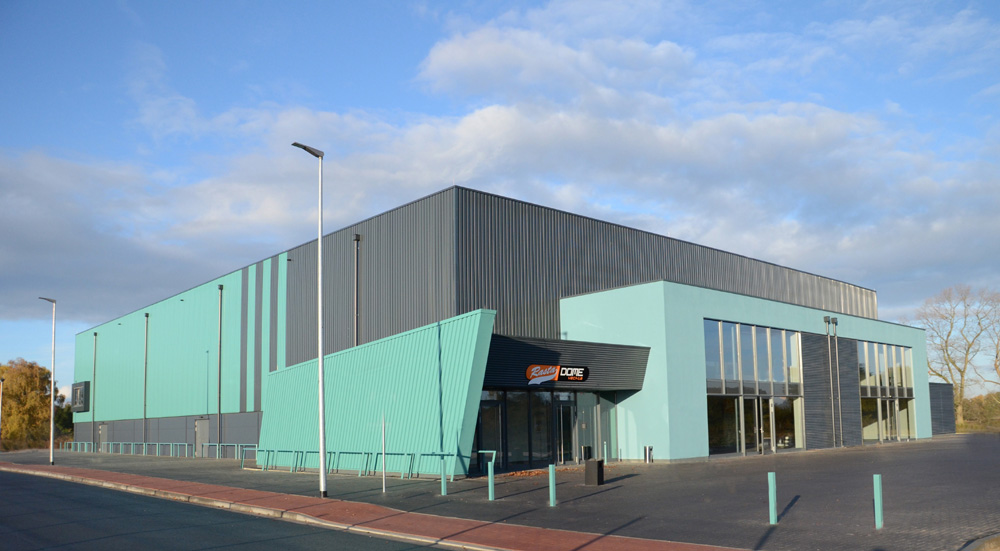
The Rasta Dome, the home arena of the club

== History ==
=== Foundation ===
The club was founded on 26 June 1979 as the basketball team of the Antonianum Gymnasium, with former students playing in the team. The name of the club, "Rasta", is a tribute to reggae music because Bob Marley's Rastaman Vibration was playing when the name was decided.

=== Recent years (2012–2016) ===
In the 2012–13 season, Vechta won the German second-tier ProA after beating Gloria Giants Düsseldorf in the finals. This season, they entered their new home arena, the Rasta Dome. After winning the ProA in its first season in the new arena, Vechta was promoted to the first-tier Basketball Bundesliga (BBL). In 2013, the arena, which had an original capacity of 2,000 spectators, was expanded to accommodate 3,140 fans in order to meet minimum size requirements for the Basketball Bundesliga. However, the team finished last in the 2013–14 season and were immediately relegated back to the ProA. In the 2015–16 season, Rasta once again promoted to the Bundesliga. Just like the previous BBL adventure, the team would relegate again in its first season back.

==== National playoffs and European debut (2018–2020) ====
In April 2018, Vechta promoted to the BBL for the third time, after defeating PS Karlsruhe Lions in the ProA semi-finals, 3–1. In the 2018–19 Basketball Bundesliga, Vechta had an incredible season under Spanish head coach Pedro Calles. Vechta claimed the fourth place in the regular season to advance to the BBL playoffs for the first time in club history. In the playoffs, it eliminated Brose Bamberg with a 3–1 score. In the semi-finals, Vechta was swept by title favorites Bayern Munich.

In the 2019–20 season, Rasta made its debut in Europe as it qualified for a spot in the Basketball Champions League (BCL). In Group B, the German team finished in the 5th place.

Rasta Vechta won their third ProA title in 2022-23, tying the record hold by Mitteldeutscher BC for most championships.

== Honours ==
- ProA
  - Winners: 2012–13, 2017–18, 2022–23
    - Runner-up: 2015–16

== Players ==
=== Current roster ===
Rasta Vechta roster
Players
Coaches

Pos.	No.	Nat.	Name	Ht.	Age
G	2	(Canada)	Pandi, Lloyd	1.93 m (6 ft 4 in)	26 – 10 December 1999
PG	3	(United States)	Clark, Kihei	1.78 m (5 ft 10 in)	26 – 25 January 2000
SG	4	(United States)	Franklin, Armaan	1.93 m (6 ft 4 in)	25 – 17 November 2000
SG	7	(Germany)	Hemschemeier, Peter	1.91 m (6 ft 3 in)	23 – 17 September 2003
G	8	(Croatia) (Germany)	Dolić, Dominik	1.94 m (6 ft 4 in)	20 – 30 October 2006
PF	9	(Germany)	Sabally, Lamin	2.03 m (6 ft 8 in)	24 – 1 October 2002
G/F	10	(United States)	Edler-Davis, Justin	1.93 m (6 ft 4 in)	28 – 9 February 1998
G/F	11	(United States)	Lewis, Matt	1.96 m (6 ft 5 in)	27 – 21 December 1998
PG	12	(United States)	Kuhse, Tommy	1.88 m (6 ft 2 in)	28 – 5 January 1998
PF	14	(Germany)	Herkenhoff, Philipp	2.09 m (6 ft 10 in)	27 – 29 June 1999
SF	15	(Germany)	Trettin, Linus	2.04 m (6 ft 8 in)	21 – 16 May 2005
C	21	(Germany)	Pleiß, Tibor	2.21 m (7 ft 3 in)	37 – 2 November 1989
SF	22	(United States)	Sueing, Justice	1.98 m (6 ft 6 in)	27 – 15 March 1999
C	23	(Germany)	Thiemann, Lars	2.16 m (7 ft 1 in)	26 – 22 May 2000
SG	77	(Austria) (Germany)	Lanmüller, Timo	1.93 m (6 ft 4 in)	25 – 17 March 2001

Head coach

- (Germany) Christian Held

Assistant coach(es)

- (Germany) Marius Graf
- (Germany) Harm-Ubbo Horst

Legend

- (C) Team captain
- Injured

- Roster
Updated: October 30, 2026

=== Notable players ===
- (United States) Brandon Bowman (2013–2014)
- (United States) (Brazil) Scott Machado (2016)
- (United States) (Latvia) Andrew Smith (2017–2018)
- (United States) Austin Hollins (2018–2019)
- (United States) (Uganda) Ish Wainright (2019–2020)
- (United States) (Nigeria) Ike Iroegbu (2020–2021)

== Season by season ==
Champions	Runners-up	Playoff berth	Promoted	Relegated

Season	Tier	League	Finish	Wins	Losses	Win%	Playoffs	BBL-Pokal	European competitions		Head coach
Rasta Vechta
2012–13	II	ProA	1st	31	9	.775	Won quarterfinals (Ehingen Urspring), 3–0; Won semi-finals (BG Karlsruhe), 3–2; Won finals (Düsseldorf Giants), 2–0	–	–		
2013–14	I	BBL	18th	6	28	.176					
2014–15	II	ProA	10th	12	18	.400	–	–	–		
2015–16	II	ProA	2nd	34	4	.895	Won quarterfinals (Nürnberger BC), 3–0; Won semi-finals (Oettinger Rockets), 3–0; Lost finals (Jena)	–	–		
2016–17	I	BBL	17th	3	30	.091	–	–	–		
2017–18	II	ProA	1st	34	5	.872	Won quarterfinals (Phoenix Hagen), 3–0; Won semi-finals (Karlsruhe), 3–0; Won finals (Crailsheim)	–	–		
2018–19	I	BBL	4th	27	14	.659	Won quarterfinals (Brose Bamberg), 3–1; Lost semi-finals (Bayern), 0–3	–	–		(Spain) Pedro Calles
2019–20	I	BBL	9th	12	9	.571	–	Round of 16	3 Champions League	Regular Season	(Spain) Pedro Calles
2020–21	I	BBL	18th	7	27	.206	–	Group stage	–		(Germany) Thomas Päch
2021–22	II	ProA	12th	16	16	.500	–	–	–		(Serbia) Vladimir Lučić
2022–23	II	ProA	1st	27	7	.794	Won quarterfinals (Phoenix Hagen), 3–0; Won semi-finals (Gießen 46ers), 3–1; Won finals (Tübingen)	–	–		(Serbia) Vladimir Lučić (United States) Ty Harrelson
2023–24	I	BBL	6th	21	13	.618	Lost quarter-finals (Chemnitz), 1–3	Quarterfinals	–		(United States) Ty Harrelson
2024–25	I	BBL	12th	16	16	.500	–	Quarterfinals	2 Champions League	Regular season	(Austria) Martin Schiller
2025–26	I	BBL	7th	17	17	.500	Lost quarter-finals (Berlin), 2–3	Quarterfinals	4 Europe Cup	Regular season	(Austria) Martin Schiller
2026–27	I	BBL				–			2 Champions League		(Austria) Martin Schiller

== European record ==
Season	Achievement	Record	Notes
Basketball Champions League
2019–20	Regular Season	6–8	5th place in Group B with Włocławek, Antwerp Giants, Hapoel Jerusalem, Élan Béarnais, Burgos, AEK and Bandırma
2024–25	Regular Season	1–5	4th place in Group D with ERA Nymburk, Galatasaray and Promitheas

== Head coaches ==
Period	Name	Honours
2000–2001	(Germany) Matthias Weber	
2001–2003	(Germany) Thorsten Doeding	
2003–2004	(Germany) Michael Canisius	
2004–2005	(Germany) Kai Deitermann	
2005–2009	(Germany) Geschilderde Scheper	
2009–2014	(Germany) Pat Elzie	
2014–2015	(Germany) Stephen Arigbabu	
2015	(Germany) Pat Elzie	
2015–2017	(Germany) Andreas Wagner	
2017–2018	(Germany) Douglas Spradley	
2018–2020	(Spain) Pedro Calles	BBL semifinalist (2019)
2020–2021	(Germany) Thomas Päch	
2021–2022	(Serbia) Vladimir Lučić	
2022–2024	(United States) (Australia) Ty Harrelson	
2024–	(Austria) Martin Schiller	

== SC Rasta Vechta II ==
The second team of Rasta Vechta plays in the ProA, the German second division.

=== Current roster ===
Note: Flags indicate national team eligibility at FIBA-sanctioned events. Players may hold other non-FIBA nationalities not displayed.

SC Rasta Vechta II roster
Players
Coaches

Pos.	No.	Nat.	Name	Ht.	Wt.	Age
PG	3	(Germany)	Bayram, Kaya	1.88 m (6 ft 2 in)	83 kg (183 lb)	22 – 23 February 2004
SG	5	(Netherlands)	Bernardina, Djairo	1.83 m (6 ft 0 in)	76 kg (168 lb)	19 – 12 June 2007
SF	6	(Germany)	Slooten, Luc van	2.04 m (6 ft 8 in)	111 kg (245 lb)	24 – 17 April 2002
SF	7	(United States)	House, Luke	1.95 m (6 ft 5 in)	100 kg (220 lb)	25 – 14 February 2001
PG	8	(Germany)	Grüß, Moritz	1.87 m (6 ft 2 in)	78 kg (172 lb)	18 – 30 September 2008
PG	10	(Germany)	Smit, Kevin	1.82 m (6 ft 0 in)	84 kg (185 lb)	35 – 6 April 1991
PF	11	(Germany)	Bühner, Karl	2.01 m (6 ft 7 in)	106 kg (234 lb)	21 – 23 May 2005
PF	12	(United States)	Sleva, Domenick	1.98 m (6 ft 6 in)	91 kg (201 lb)	28 – 15 September 1998
SF	13	(Germany)	Petric, Marko	1.97 m (6 ft 6 in)	93 kg (205 lb)	18 – 21 April 2008
PF	14	(Germany)	Ruf, Linus	2.11 m (6 ft 11 in)	121 kg (267 lb)	21 – 21 July 2005
SF	15	(Germany)	Trettin, Linus	2.02 m (6 ft 8 in)	89 kg (196 lb)	21 – 16 May 2005
C	16	(Germany)	Lastring, Fynn	2.06 m (6 ft 9 in)	90 kg (198 lb)	19 – 11 May 2007
PG	24	(Germany)	Krupnikas, Roy	1.86 m (6 ft 1 in)	84 kg (185 lb)	20 – 12 October 2006
PF	29	(United States)	Carr, Phillip	2.03 m (6 ft 8 in)	93 kg (205 lb)	31 – 20 October 1995
C	44	(Germany)	Bacak, Marko	2.10 m (6 ft 11 in)	114 kg (251 lb)	31 – 14 November 1995
SG	71	(Denmark)	Klussmann, Jonathan	1.90 m (6 ft 3 in)	88 kg (194 lb)	24 – 6 October 2002

Head coach

(Germany) Hendrik Gruhn

Assistant coach(es)

(Germany) Harm-Ubbo Horst

Legend

- (C) Team captain
- Injured

- Roster
Updated: 24 December 2024
