= 2021 BBL Playoffs =

German basketball postseason

Tournament details
- Country: Germany
- Dates: 19 May – 15 June
- Teams: 8

Final positions
- Champions: Alba Berlin
- Runners-up: Bayern Munich
- Semifinalists: Riesen Ludwigsburg; ratiopharm Ulm

The 2021 BBL Playoffs were the concluding postseason of the 2020–21 Basketball Bundesliga season. The playoffs started on 19 May and ended on 13 June 2021.

== Playoff qualifying ==
Seed	Team	Record	Clinched		
Seed	Team	Record	Playoff berth	Seeded team	Top seed
1	Riesen Ludwigsburg	30–4	22 March 2021	13 April 2021	2 May 2021
2	Alba Berlin	28–6	23 March 2021	30 April 2021	–
3	Baskets Oldenburg	25–9	4 April 2021	11 May 2021	–
4	Bayern Munich	24–10	23 March 2021	2 May 2021	–
5	Crailsheim Merlins	24–10	8 April 2021	–	–
6	ratiopharm Ulm	23–11	13 April 2021	–	–
7	Hamburg Towers	21–13	15 April 2021	–	–
8	Brose Bamberg	17–17	2 May 2021	–	–

== Bracket ==
Quarterfinals
1	Riesen Ludwigsburg	3
8	Brose Bamberg	2
4	Bayern Munich	3
5	Crailsheim Merlins	1
2	Alba Berlin	3
7	Hamburg Towers	0
3	Baskets Oldenburg	1
6	ratiopharm Ulm	3

Semifinals
1	Riesen Ludwigsburg	1
4	Bayern Munich	3
2	Alba Berlin	3
6	ratiopharm Ulm	1

Finals
4	Bayern Munich	1
2	Alba Berlin	3

== Quarterfinals ==
The quarterfinals were played in a best of five format from 19 to 27 May 2021.

=== Riesen Ludwigsburg vs Brose Bamberg ===
19 May 2021
19:00

Boxscore

Riesen Ludwigsburg	83–69	Brose Bamberg
Scoring by quarter: 18–22, 23–11, 17–17, 25–19
Pts: Jaleen Smith 21; Rebs: Jamel McLean 13; Asts: Jordan Hulls 5		Pts: Kenneth Ogbe 16; Rebs: Christian Sengfelder 7 Asts: Tyler Larson 5
Ludwigsburg leads series 1–0

MHP Arena, Ludwigsburg
Attendance: 0 (Note: The match was played behind closed doors due to the COVID-19 pandemic.)
Referees: Clemens Fritz, Moritz Reiter, Christof Madinger

21 May 2021
20:30

Boxscore

Riesen Ludwigsburg	86–83	Brose Bamberg
Scoring by quarter: 24–16, 19–20, 20–28, 23–19
Pts: Jamel McLean 21; Rebs: Jamel McLean 9 Asts: Jaleen Smith 10		Pts: David Kravish 17; Rebs: David Kravish 9 Asts: Alex Ruoff 5
Ludwigsburg leads series 2–0

MHP Arena, Ludwigsburg
Attendance: 0
Referees: Anne Panther, Benjamin Barth, Johannes Hack

23 May 2021
15:00

Boxscore

Brose Bamberg	96–60	Riesen Ludwigsburg
Scoring by quarter: 29–17, 31–18, 22–13, 14–12
Pts: three players 14; Rebs: Christian Sengfelder 8 Asts: Bennet Hundt 9		Pts: Darden, Polas Bartolo 11; Rebs: Oscar da Silva 6 Asts: Jaleen Smith 3
Ludwigsburg leads series 2–1

Brose Arena, Bamberg
Attendance: 0
Referees: Carsten Straube, Nesa Kovačevic, Enrico Streit

25 May 2021
18:30

Boxscore

Brose Bamberg	87–84	Riesen Ludwigsburg
Scoring by quarter: 24–21, 25–25, 26–16, 12–22
Pts: Bennet Hundt 23; Rebs: three players 5 Asts: Hundt, Lockhart 4		Pts: Barry Brown Jr. 32; Rebs: Darden, Smith 6 Asts: Jaleen Smith 4
Series tied, 2–2

Brose Arena, Bamberg
Attendance: 0
Referees: Robert Lottermoser, Moritz Reiter, Armin Mutapčić

27 May 2021
18:30

Boxscore

Riesen Ludwigsburg	95–73	Brose Bamberg
Scoring by quarter: 26–16, 24–21, 26–15, 19–21
Pts: Tremmell Darden 14; Rebs: Polas Bartolo, Smith 5 Asts: Jaleen Smith 6		Pts: Hundt, Sengfelder 19; Rebs: three players 4 Asts: Alex Ruoff 3
Ludwigsburg wins series 3–2

MHP Arena, Ludwigsburg
Attendance: 0
Referees: Clemens Fritz, Moritz Reiter, Christof Madinger

=== Alba Berlin vs Hamburg Towers ===
20 May 2021
19:00

Boxscore

Alba Berlin	82–59	Hamburg Towers
Scoring by quarter: 30–18, 18–13, 22–8, 12–20
Pts: Maodo Lô 19; Rebs: Malte Delow 6 Asts: Peyton Siva 8		Pts: T. J. Shorts 11; Rebs: three players 5 Asts: Taylor, Shorts 4
Berlin leads series 1–0

Mercedes-Benz Arena, Berlin
Attendance: 0
Referees: Robert Lottermoser, Oliver Krause, Steve Bittner

22 May 2021
20:30

Boxscore

Alba Berlin	95–83	Hamburg Towers
Scoring by quarter: 27–22, 21–19, 20–24, 27–18
Pts: Simone Fontecchio 18; Rebs: Fontecchio, Lammers 8 Asts: Lô, Siva 5		Pts: T. J. Shorts 27; Rebs: Maik Kotsar 10; Asts: T. J. Shorts 8
Berlin leads series 2–0

Mercedes-Benz Arena, Berlin
Attendance: 0
Referees: Toni Rodriguez, Carsten Straube, Steve Bittner

24 May 2021
18:00

Boxscore

Hamburg Towers	73–85	Alba Berlin
Scoring by quarter: 16–30, 19–18, 19–14, 19–23
Pts: Cuthbertson, Kotsar 17; Rebs: Maik Kotsar 9 Asts: T. J. Shorts 8		Pts: Fontecchio, Lô 14; Rebs: Ben Lammers 12; Asts: Peyton Siva 6
Berlin wins series 3–0

Edel-optics.de Arena, Hamburg
Attendance: 0
Referees: Robert Lottermoser, Martin Matip, Gentian Cici

=== EWE Baskets Oldenburg vs ratiopharm Ulm ===
20 May 2021
20:30

Boxscore

EWE Baskets Oldenburg	88–93	ratiopharm Ulm
Scoring by quarter: 32–19, 13–27, 16–20, 27–27
Pts: Rickey Paulding 16; Rebs: Breunig, Pressey 4 Asts: Mahalbašić, Pressey 5		Pts: Andreas Obst 24; Rebs: Dylan Osetkowski 6 Asts: Dylan Osetkowski 6
Ulm leads series 1–0

Große EWE Arena, Oldenburg
Attendance: 0
Referees: Martin Matip, Nesa Kovačevic, Gentian Cici

22 May 2021
18:00

Boxscore

EWE Baskets Oldenburg	77–75	ratiopharm Ulm
Scoring by quarter: 24–11, 15–23, 19–28, 19–13
Pts: Nathan Boothe 18; Rebs: Rašid Mahalbašić 5 Asts: Phil Pressey 6		Pts: Aric Holman 13; Rebs: Dylan Osetkowski 7 Asts: Troy Caupain 8
Series tied, 1–1

Große EWE Arena, Oldenburg
Attendance: 0
Referees: Robert Lottermoser, Gentian Cici, Oliver Krause

24 May 2021
20:30

Boxscore

ratiopharm Ulm	70–66	EWE Baskets Oldenburg
Scoring by quarter: 19–11, 19–14, 12–25, 20–16
Pts: Andreas Obst 19; Rebs: Aric Holman 10; Asts: Troy Caupain 4		Pts: Nathan Boothe 12; Rebs: Rašid Mahalbašić 10; Asts: Braydon Hobbs 6
Ulm leads series 2–1

Arena Ulm/Neu-Ulm, Neu-Ulm
Attendance: 0
Referees: Moritz Reiter, Clemens Fritz, Armin Mutapčić

26 May 2021
19:00

Boxscore

ratiopharm Ulm	96–88	EWE Baskets Oldenburg
Scoring by quarter: 16–17, 17–25, 33–25, 30–21
Pts: Troy Caupain 20; Rebs: Dylan Osetkowski 9 Asts: Troy Caupain 7		Pts: Rickey Paulding 25; Rebs: Rašid Mahalbašić 7 Asts: Rašid Mahalbašić 6
Ulm wins series 3–1

Arena Ulm/Neu-Ulm, Neu-Ulm
Attendance: 0
Referees: Anne Panther, Christof Madinger, Benjamin Barth

=== Bayern Munich vs Crailsheim Merlins ===
19 May 2021
20:30

Boxscore

Bayern Munich	86–66	Crailsheim Merlins
Scoring by quarter: 22–13, 29–25, 15–17, 20–11
Pts: Vladimir Lučić 22; Rebs: three players 7 Asts: D. J. Seeley 7		Pts: Trae Bell-Haynes 23; Rebs: Jamuni McNeace 5 Asts: three players 2
Munich leads series 1–0

Audi Dome, Munich
Attendance: 0
Referees: Carsten Straube, Benjamin Barth, Armin Mutapčić

21 May 2021
19:00

Boxscore

Bayern Munich	83–79	Crailsheim Merlins
Scoring by quarter: 25–20, 17–29, 25–19, 16–21
Pts: D. J. Seeley 33; Rebs: Jalen Reynolds 6 Asts: Wade Baldwin IV 8		Pts: Trae Bell-Haynes 23; Rebs: Jamuni McNeace 6 Asts: Bell-Haynes, Lasisi 6
Munich leads series 2–0

Audi Dome, Munich
Attendance: 0
Referees: Moritz Reiter, Clemens Fritz, Enrico Streit

23 May 2021
18:00

Boxscore

Crailsheim Merlins	96–82	Bayern Munich
Scoring by quarter: 32–19, 22–16, 18–21, 24–26
Pts: Trae Bell-Haynes 34; Rebs: Fabian Bleck 6 Asts: Trae Bell-Haynes 9		Pts: Wade Baldwin IV 22; Rebs: Wade Baldwin IV 5 Asts: Wade Baldwin IV 6
Munich leads series 2–1

Arena Hohenlohe, Crailsheim
Attendance: 0
Referees: Anne Panther, Christof Madinger, Johannes Hack

25 May 2021
20:30

Boxscore

Crailsheim Merlins	72–86	Bayern Munich
Scoring by quarter: 16–16, 16–24, 21–24, 19–22
Pts: Trae Bell-Haynes 32; Rebs: Jeremy Jones 7 Asts: Trae Bell-Haynes 4		Pts: Paul Zipser 18; Rebs: Jalen Reynolds 8 Asts: Wade Baldwin IV 11
Munich wins series 3–1

Arena Hohenlohe, Crailsheim
Attendance: 0
Referees: Martin Matip, Clemens Fritz, Enrico Streit

== Semifinals ==
The semifinals were played in a best of five format from 29 May to 5 June 2021.

=== Riesen Ludwigsburg vs Bayern Munich ===
29 May 2021
20:30

Boxscore

Riesen Ludwigsburg	101–98	Bayern Munich
Scoring by quarter: 29–17, 26–30, 21–19, 25–32
Pts: Jamel McLean 27; Rebs: Jonah Radebaugh 9 Asts: Yorman Polas Bartolo 4		Pts: Vladimir Lučić 24; Rebs: Paul Zipser 8 Asts: D. J. Seeley 5
Ludwigsburg leads series 1–0

MHP Arena, Ludwigsburg
Attendance: 0
Referees: Anne Panther, Christof Madinger, Enrico Streit

31 May 2021
19:00

Boxscore

Riesen Ludwigsburg	72–82	Bayern Munich
Scoring by quarter: 19–19, 14–23, 21–21, 18–19
Pts: Jonah Radebaugh 20; Rebs: Jonah Radebaugh 9 Asts: Yorman Polas Bartolo 3		Pts: D. J. Seeley 22; Rebs: Vladimir Lučić 6 Asts: Žan Mark Šiško 8
Series tied, 1–1

MHP Arena, Ludwigsburg
Attendance: 0
Referees: Moritz Reiter, Clemens Fritz, Johannes Hack

2 June 2021
20:30

Boxscore

Bayern Munich	81–78	Riesen Ludwigsburg
Scoring by quarter: 19–21, 18–18, 22–14, 22–25
Pts: Baldwin IV, Lučić 22; Rebs: Leon Radošević 8 Asts: Žan Mark Šiško 6		Pts: Jaleen Smith 29; Rebs: Jaleen Smith 8 Asts: Jaleen Smith 7
Munich leads series 2–1

Audi Dome, Munich
Attendance: 0
Referees: Clemens Fritz, Benjamin Barth, Carsten Straube

4 June 2021
20:30

Boxscore

Bayern Munich	82–73	Riesen Ludwigsburg
Scoring by quarter: 20–16, 21–18, 16–23, 25–16
Pts: Robin Amaize 16; Rebs: JaJuan Johnson 8 Asts: Baldwin IV, Šiško 5		Pts: Jamel McLean 17; Rebs: Jaleen Smith 5 Asts: Hulls, Smith 3
Munich wins series 3–1

Audi Dome, Munich
Attendance: 0
Referees: Robert Lottermoser, Martin Matip, Johannes Hack

=== Alba Berlin vs ratiopharm Ulm ===
30 May 2021
14:00

Boxscore

Alba Berlin	71–73	ratiopharm Ulm
Scoring by quarter: 16–20, 21–14, 20–15, 14–24
Pts: Peyton Siva 15; Rebs: Simone Fontecchio 11; Asts: Peyton Siva 5		Pts: Dylan Osetkowski 21; Rebs: Dylan Osetkowski 11; Asts: Troy Caupain 8
Ulm leads series 1–0

Mercedes-Benz Arena, Berlin
Attendance: 0
Referees: Robert Lottermoser, Steve Bittner, Carsten Straube

1 June 2021
20:30

Boxscore

Alba Berlin	92–78	ratiopharm Ulm
Scoring by quarter: 28–18, 19–15, 19–24, 26–21
Pts: Maodo Lô 20; Rebs: Tim Schneider 7 Asts: Maodo Lô 6		Pts: Demitrius Conger 19; Rebs: Caupain, Petrucelli 5 Asts: Troy Caupain 6
Series tied, 1–1

Mercedes-Benz Arena, Berlin
Attendance: 1,000
Referees: Robert Lottermoser, Gentian Cici, Steve Bittner

3 June 2021
20:30

Boxscore

ratiopharm Ulm	72–80	Alba Berlin
Scoring by quarter: 21–16, 16–23, 16–14, 19–27
Pts: Dylan Osetkowski 16; Rebs: Cameron Clark 7 Asts: Troy Caupain 7		Pts: Maodo Lô 21; Rebs: Ben Lammers 9 Asts: Maodo Lô 7
Berlin leads series 2–1

Arena Ulm/Neu-Ulm, Neu-Ulm
Attendance: 0
Referees: Anne Panther, Christof Madinger, Enrico Streit

5 June 2021
20:30

Boxscore

ratiopharm Ulm	75–77	Alba Berlin
Scoring by quarter: 15–20, 21–16, 13–17, 26–24
Pts: Andreas Obst 24; Rebs: Cameron Clark 8 Asts: Troy Caupain 10		Pts: Fontecchio, Giffey 17; Rebs: Granger, Lammers 7 Asts: Simone Fontecchio 5
Berlin wins series 3–1

Arena Ulm/Neu-Ulm, Neu-Ulm
Attendance: 0
Referees: Anne Panther, Moritz Reiter, Benjamin Barth

== Finals ==
The finals were played in a best of five format from 9 to 13 June 2021.

9 June 2021
20:30

Boxscore

Alba Berlin	89–86	Bayern Munich
Scoring by quarter: 24–18, 21–22, 23–19, 21–27
Pts: Marcus Eriksson 23; Rebs: Simone Fontecchio 6 Asts: Jayson Granger 7		Pts: James Gist 19; Rebs: Jalen Reynolds 7 Asts: Žan Mark Šiško 9
Berlin leads series 1–0

Mercedes-Benz Arena, Berlin
Attendance: 1,450
Referees: Robert Lottermoser, Gentian Cici, Carsten Straube

10 June 2021
20:30

Boxscore

Alba Berlin	66–76	Bayern Munich
Scoring by quarter: 7–20, 19–15, 24–17, 16–24
Pts: Ben Lammers 15; Rebs: Luke Sikma 8 Asts: Jayson Granger 7		Pts: Vladimir Lučić 26; Rebs: Žan Mark Šiško 5 Asts: Wade Baldwin IV 7
Series tied, 1–1

Mercedes-Benz Arena, Berlin
Attendance: 2,000
Referees: Anne Panther, Martin Matip, Steve Bittner

12 June 2021
15:00

Boxscore

Bayern Munich	69–81	Alba Berlin
Scoring by quarter: 18–19, 19–18, 19–22, 13–22
Pts: D. J. Seeley 23; Rebs: Leon Radošević 7 Asts: Žan Mark Šiško 10		Pts: Eriksson, Sikma 13; Rebs: Luke Sikma 11; Asts: Maodo Lô 6
Berlin leads series 2–1

Audi Dome, Munich
Attendance: 1,300
Referees: Clemens Fritz, Moritz Reiter, Christof Madinger

13 June 2021
15:00

Boxscore

Bayern Munich	79–86	Alba Berlin
Scoring by quarter: 9–21, 21–17, 22–20, 27–28
Pts: Wade Baldwin IV 18; Rebs: Leon Radošević 7 Asts: Wade Baldwin IV 5		Pts: Jayson Granger 29; Rebs: Christ Koumadje 7 Asts: Granger, Lammers 3
Berlin wins series 3–1

Audi Dome, Munich
Attendance: 1,300
Referees: Robert Lottermoser, Gentian Cici, Anne Panther
