= 2021–22 BBL-Pokal =

- Season: 2021–22
- Dates: 2 October 2021 – 20 February 2022
- Games played: 15
- Teams: 16

Regular season
- Season MVP: Maodo Lô

Finals
- Champions: Alba Berlin (11th title)
- Runners-up: Crailsheim Merlins

The 2021–22 BBL-Pokal was the 55th season of the BBL-Pokal, the domestic cup competition of the Basketball Bundesliga (BBL).

Alba Berlin won their eleventh title by defeating Crailsheim Merlins in the final.

== Participants ==
The sixteen highest placed teams from the 2020–21 Basketball Bundesliga, without the relegated teams and promoted teams, qualified for the tournament.

== Standings ==
Pos	Team	Pld	W	L	PF	PA	PD	Pts	Qualification
1	Riesen Ludwigsburg	34	30	4	3027	2621	+406	60	Qualified
2	Alba Berlin	34	28	6	2938	2585	+353	56	Qualified
3	Baskets Oldenburg	34	25	9	3149	2848	+301	50	Qualified
4	Bayern Munich	34	24	10	2940	2721	+219	48	Qualified
5	Crailsheim Merlins	34	24	10	2945	2797	+148	48	Qualified
6	ratiopharm Ulm	34	23	11	3005	2648	+357	46	Qualified
7	Hamburg Towers	34	21	13	2891	2723	+168	42	Qualified
8	Brose Bamberg	34	17	17	2871	2812	+59	34	Qualified
9	Basketball Löwen Braunschweig	34	16	18	2857	2958	−101	32	Qualified
10	Medi Bayreuth	34	15	19	2867	2877	−10	30	Qualified
11	Skyliners Frankfurt	34	13	21	2613	2815	−202	26	Qualified
12	BG Göttingen	34	13	21	2874	3065	−191	26	Qualified
13	Telekom Baskets Bonn	34	12	22	2798	2882	−84	24	Qualified
14	Niners Chemnitz	34	12	22	2691	2979	−288	24	Qualified
15	Mitteldeutscher BC	34	9	25	2813	3057	−244	18	Qualified
16	s.Oliver Würzburg	34	9	25	2636	2986	−350	18	Qualified
17	Giessen 46ers	34	8	26	2912	3191	−279	16	
18	Rasta Vechta	34	7	27	2718	2980	−262	14	

Source: BBL
Rules for classification: 1) Points; 2) Head-to-head; 3) Points difference; 4) Points scored.

== Round of 16 ==
The games took place between 2 and 5 October 2021.

2 October 2021
18:00

Boxscore

Löwen Braunschweig	97–77	BG Göttingen
Scoring by quarter: 21–28, 24–17, 20–14, 32–18
Pts: Robin Amaize 25; Rebs: Owen Klassen 7 Asts: Ondřej Sehnal 9		Pts: Zack Bryant 12; Rebs: Kamar Baldwin 5 Asts: Stephen Brown 7

Volkswagen Halle, Braunschweig
Attendance: 1,586
Referees: Oliver Krause, Zulfikar Oruzgani, Nermin Hodžić

2 October 2021
18:00

Boxscore

Niners Chemnitz	87–85	ratiopharm Ulm
Scoring by quarter: 27–23, 11–14, 19–18, 30–30
Pts: Darion Atkins 19; Rebs: Atkins 8 Asts: Gerald Robinson 6		Pts: Jaron Blossomgame 22; Rebs: Cristiano Felício 14; Asts: Semaj Christon 5

Chemnitz Arena, Chemnitz
Attendance: 2,612
Referees: Robert Lottermoser, Gentian Cici, Armin Mutapcic

2 October 2021
20:30

Boxscore

Crailsheim Merlins	65–63 (OT)	MHP Riesen Ludwigsburg
Scoring by quarter: 19–19, 16–14, 10–10, 8–10, Overtime: 12–10
Pts: T. J. Shorts 20; Rebs: Jaren Lewis 9 Asts: Shorts 10		Pts: Yorman Polas Bartolo 13; Rebs: Justin Simon 11; Asts: Polas Bartolo, Radebaugh 3

Arena Hohenlohe, Crailsheim
Attendance: 1,977
Referees: Clemens Fritz, Enrico Streit, Christian Theis

3 October 2021
15:00

Boxscore

Skyliners Frankfurt	75–67	Baskets Oldenburg
Scoring by quarter: 22–20, 14–24, 19–15, 20–8
Pts: Len Schoormann 17; Rebs: Matt Haarms 9 Asts: Quantez Robertson 11		Pts: Max Heidegger 15; Rebs: Sebastian Herrera 4 Asts: Phil Pressey 5

Fraport Arena, Frankfurt
Attendance: 850
Referees: Anne Panther, Martin Matip, Moritz Krüper

3 October 2021
15:00

Boxscore

s.Oliver Würzburg	97–78	Syntainics MBC
Scoring by quarter: 23–17, 26–17, 19–19, 29–25
Pts: Nico Carvacho 18; Rebs: Nico Carvacho 7 Asts: William Buford 5		Pts: Morris, Rebić 17; Rebs: Chris Coffey 8 Asts: Nikola Rebić 6

s.Oliver Arena, Würzburg
Attendance: 1,350
Referees: Christof Madinger, Nicolas Brendel, Dominik Bejaoui

3 October 2021
18:00

Boxscore

Alba Berlin	83–80 (OT)	Telekom Baskets Bonn
Scoring by quarter: 14–17, 17–21, 19–19, 20–13, Overtime: 13–10
Pts: Yovel Zoosman 20; Rebs: Luke Sikma 14; Asts: Jaleen Smith 5		Pts: Parker Jackson-Cartwright 26; Rebs: Justin Gorham 11; Asts: Parker Jackson-Cartwright 9

Mercedes-Benz Arena, Berlin
Attendance: 3,115
Referees: Carsten Straube, Steve Bittner, Tamer Arik

3 October 2021
20:30

Boxscore

Bayern Munich	98–77	Brose Bamberg
Scoring by quarter: 19–21, 23–24, 32–18, 24–14
Pts: Corey Walden 25; Rebs: Jason George 5 Asts: Žan Mark Šiško 6		Pts: Omar Prewitt 15; Rebs: Justin Robinson 5 Asts: Heckmann, Robinson 5

Audi Dome, Munich
Attendance: 1,928
Referees: Moritz Reiter, Nesa Kovacevic, Andreas Bohn

5 October 2021
19:00

Boxscore

Medi Bayreuth	93–84	Hamburg Towers
Scoring by quarter: 21–24, 26–23, 30–12, 16–25
Pts: Janari Jõesaar 22; Rebs: Martynas Sajus 7 Asts: Bastian Doreth 9		Pts: Jaylon Brown 19; Rebs: Seth Hinrichs 5 Asts: Hinrichs 4

Oberfrankenhalle, Bayreuth
Attendance: 1,617
Referees: Benjamin Barth, Johannes Hack, Konstantin Simonow

== Quarterfinals ==
The draw was held on 5 October 2021. The games took place on 13 and 14 November 2021.

13 November 2021
18:00

Boxscore

Löwen Braunschweig	86–65	Skyliners Frankfurt
Scoring by quarter: 22–12, 18–18, 21–23, 25–12
Pts: David Krämer 19; Rebs: Owen Klassen 10; Asts: Ondřej Sehnal 7		Pts: Len Schoormann 20; Rebs: Rasheed Moore 6 Asts: Badio, Cherry 4

Volkswagen Halle, Braunschweig
Attendance: 2,051
Referees: Gentian Cici, Martin Matip, Zulifkar Oruzgani

13 November 2021
20:30

Boxscore

Medi Bayreuth	57–84	Alba Berlin
Scoring by quarter: 8–30, 17–17, 18–20, 14–17
Pts: Marcus Thornton 14; Rebs: Martynas Sajus 9 Asts: Bastian Doreth 4		Pts: Oscar da Silva 17; Rebs: Louis Olinde 10; Asts: Blatt, Sikma 5

Oberfrankenhalle, Bayreuth
Attendance: 2,033
Referees: Clemens Fritz, Carsten Straube, Christof Madinger

14 November 2021
18:00

Boxscore

Niners Chemnitz	85–80	Bayern Munich
Scoring by quarter: 21–26, 23–13, 28–14, 13–27
Pts: Darion Atkins 21; Rebs: Darion Atkins 7 Asts: Frantz Massenat 7		Pts: Andreas Obst 18; Rebs: Lučić, Rubit 6 Asts: Nick Weiler-Babb 4

Chemnitz Arena, Chemnitz
Attendance: 3,680
Referees: Robert Lottermoser, Anne Panther, Steve Bittner

14 November 2021
20:30

Boxscore

Crailsheim Merlins	82–79	s.Oliver Würzburg
Scoring by quarter: 23–16, 20–23, 24–14, 15–26
Pts: T. J. Shorts 22; Rebs: Bleck 8 Asts: T. J. Shorts 5		Pts: Buford 18; Rebs: Buford, Moller 9 Asts: Buford, Johnson 4

Arena Hohenlohe, Crailsheim
Attendance: 1,892
Referees: Moritz Reiter, Benjamin Barth, Enrico Streit

== Final four ==
The draw was held on 14 November 2021. The games will take place on 19 and 20 February 2022 in Berlin.

=== Bracket ===
Semi-finals
19 February
Löwen Braunschweig	71
Crailsheim Merlins	85
19 February
Alba Berlin	91
Niners Chemnitz	81

Final
20 February
Crailsheim Merlins	76
Alba Berlin	86

=== Semifinals ===
19 February 2022
16:00

Boxscore

Löwen Braunschweig	71–85	Crailsheim Merlins
Scoring by quarter: 21–19, 15–27, 21–11, 14–28
Pts: David Krämer 25; Rebs: David Krämer 9 Asts: Ondřej Sehnal 8		Pts: T. J. Shorts 26; Rebs: Richmond Aririguzoh 8 Asts: T. J. Shorts 9

Mercedes-Benz Arena, Berlin
Attendance: 4,000
Referees: Robert Lottermoser, Moritz Reiter, Steve Bittner

19 February 2022
19:30

Boxscore

Alba Berlin	91–81	Niners Chemnitz
Scoring by quarter: 23–31, 18–8, 28–19, 22–23
Pts: Lô, Smith 19; Rebs: Luke Sikma 10; Asts: Luke Sikma 6		Pts: Isiaha Mike 15; Rebs: Darion Atkins 9 Asts: Frantz Massenat 5

Mercedes-Benz Arena, Berlin
Attendance: 4,000
Referees: Anne Panther, Gentian Cici, Christof Madinger

=== Final ===
20 February 2022
16:00

Boxscore

Crailsheim Merlins	76–86	Alba Berlin
Scoring by quarter: 22–15, 21–24, 15–15, 18–22
Pts: T. J. Shorts 30; Rebs: Bogdan Radosavljević 9 Asts: T. J. Shorts 4		Pts: Maodo Lô 20; Rebs: Oscar da Silva 8 Asts: Luke Sikma 5

Mercedes-Benz Arena, Berlin
Attendance: 4,000
Referees: Anne Panther, Robert Lottermoser, Gentian Cici
