= Tim Schneider (basketball) =

German basketball player (born 1997)

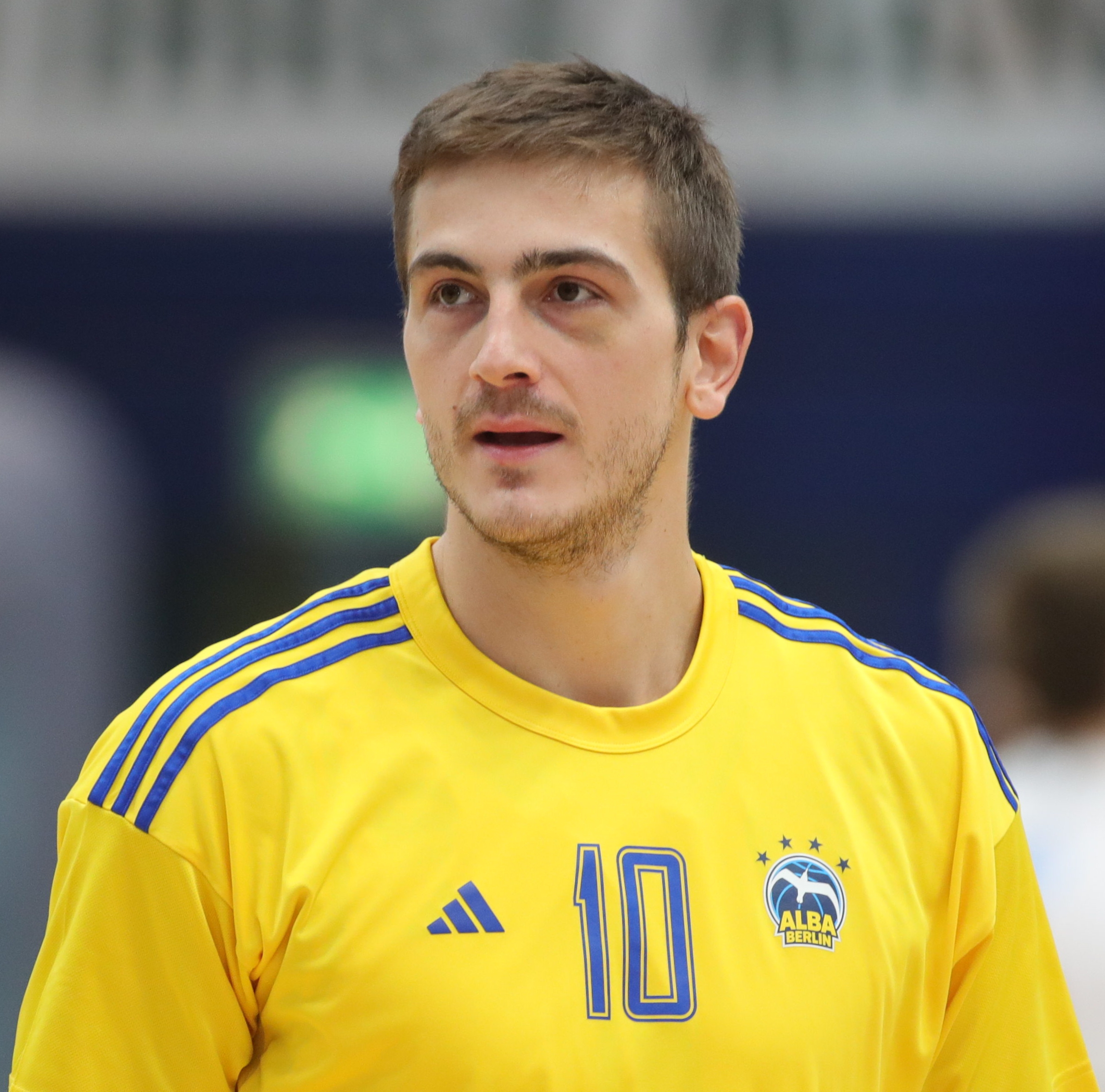
- Schneider with Alba Berlin in 2023

No. 3 – Türk Telekom
- Position: Power forward
- League: BSL; EuroCup

Personal information
- Born: 1 September 1997 (age 29) Berlin, Germany
- Listed height: 6 ft 10 in (2.08 m)
- Listed weight: 235 lb (107 kg)

Career information
- Playing career: 2016–present

Career history
- 2016–2025: Alba Berlin
- 2016–2017: →Lokomotive Bernau
- 2025–2026: Veltex Shizuoka
- 2026: Ibaraki Robots
- 2026–present: Türk Telekom

Career highlights
- German Cup winner (2022)

Tim Schneider (born 1 September 1997) is a German professional basketball player for Türk Telekom of the Turkish Basketbol Süper Ligi (BSL) and the EuroCup.

== Professional career ==
=== Alba Berlin (2016–2025) ===
He has played for Alba Berlin between 2016 and 2025.

=== Veltex Shizuoka (2025–2026) ===
On June 5, 2025, he signed with Veltex Shizuoka of the B.League.

=== Ibaraki Robots (2026) ===
On March 6, 2026, he signed with Ibaraki Robots of the B.League.

=== Türk Telekom (2026–present) ===
On June 19, 2026, he signed with Türk Telekom of the Turkish Basketbol Süper Ligi (BSL).

== International career ==
In 2016, Schneider reached fourth place with the German U20 national team at the European Championships in Finland.

In the U20 European Championship in the summer of 2017 he came up with the German team to seventh place overall, scoring an average of 5.3 points per game. In November 2018, he was named to the roster of the German men's national team for the first time in his career.

== Career statistics ==
Legend
GP	Games played	GS	Games started	MPG	Minutes per game
FG%	Field-goal percentage	3P%	3-point field-goal percentage	FT%	Free-throw percentage
RPG	Rebounds per game	APG	Assists per game	SPG	Steals per game
BPG	Blocks per game	PPG	Points per game	PIR	Performance index rating
**Bold**	Career high

=== EuroLeague ===
Year	Team	GP	GS	MPG	FG%	3P%	FT%	RPG	APG	SPG	BPG	PPG	PIR
2019–20	Alba Berlin	16	0	11.8	.392	.368	**.750**	1.3	.3	**.3**	**.1**	3.8	1.8
2020–21	Alba Berlin	28	0	11.2	.330	.295	.714	1.5	.3	.1	**.1**	2.8	1.3
2021–22	Alba Berlin	22	4	11.8	.338	.220	.375	**2.2**	.2	.2	—	2.6	1.7
2022–23	Alba Berlin	23	3	10.4	.397	**.432**	**.750**	1.9	.4	**.3**	**.1**	3.3	**3.4**
2023–24	Alba Berlin	**33**	**9**	**16.1**	**.404**	.247	.533	**2.2**	**.6**	**.3**	.0	**4.3**	3.1
Career		122	16	12.6	.374	.299	.620	1.8	.4	.2	.1	3.4	2.3

=== EuroCup ===
Year	Team	GP	GS	MPG	FG%	3P%	FT%	RPG	APG	SPG	BPG	PPG	PIR
2016–17	Alba Berlin	2	0	3.0	.000	.000	—	—	—	—	—	0.0	-1.5
2017–18	Alba Berlin	14	**1**	**12.7**	.423	.227	.455	**1.9**	**.4**	**.3**	**.1**	**3.9**	2.4
2018–19	Alba Berlin	**23**	0	11.8	**.470**	**.528**	**.750**	**1.9**	.3	**.3**	.0	3.8	**3.5**
Career		39	1	11.7	.445	.407	.579	1.8	.4	.3	.1	3.6	2.9

=== Domestic leagues ===
Year	Team	League	GP	MPG	FG%	3P%	FT%	RPG	APG	SPG	BPG	PPG
2016–17	(Germany) Lok. Bernau	ProB	26	23.0	.451	.408	.778	5.3	1.3	.7	.3	10.0
2016–17	(Germany) Alba Berlin	BBL	5	3.7	.000	—	—	.2	.2	—	—	0.0
2017–18	(Germany) Alba Berlin	BBL	32	14.6	.504	.439	.667	2.8	.8	.3	.1	5.0
2018–19	(Germany) Alba Berlin	BBL	41	12.2	.540	.429	.632	2.0	.6	.5	.1	4.3
2019–20	(Germany) Alba Berlin	BBL	10	13.0	.500	.474	.833	2.7	.7	.9	.4	5.0
2020–21	(Germany) Alba Berlin	BBL	45	13.7	.471	.433	.697	2.8	.6	.2	.1	4.9
2021–22	(Germany) Alba Berlin	BBL	17	14.8	.511	.481	.643	2.5	.8	.3	.2	7.5
2022–23	(Germany) Alba Berlin	BBL	32	17.8	.465	.377	.690	3.5	.8	.5	.1	7.2
2023–24	(Germany) Alba Berlin	BBL	45	18.6	.560	.393	.652	3.8	.7	.6	.2	8.3
