= Ben Lammers =

American basketball player (born 1995)

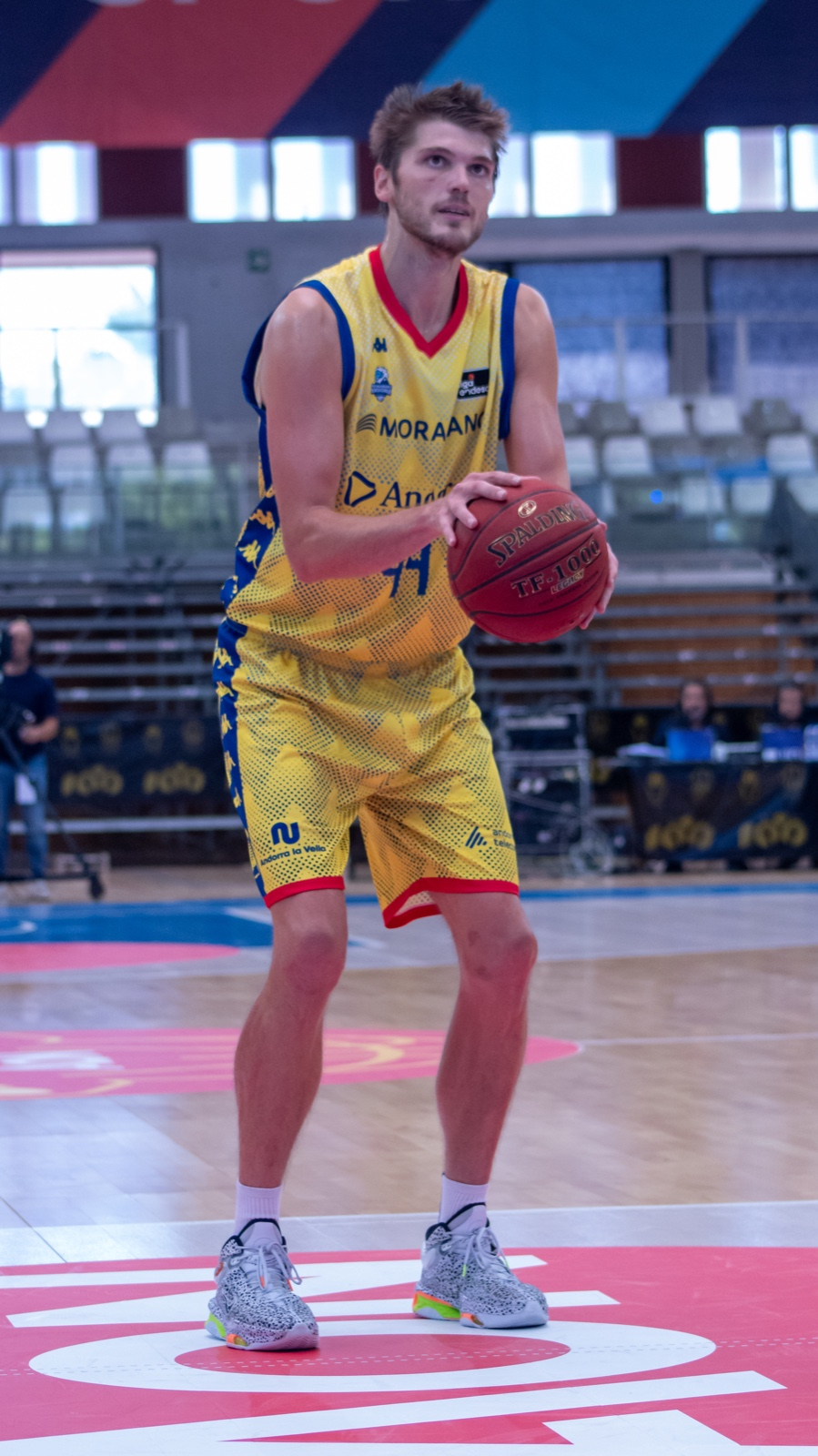
- Lammers playing for Andorra in 2024

Free agent
- Position: Center

Personal information
- Born: November 12, 1995 (age 31) Houston, Texas, U.S.
- Listed height: 6 ft 10 in (2.08 m)
- Listed weight: 228 lb (103 kg)

Career information
- High school: Alamo Heights (San Antonio, Texas)
- College: Georgia Tech (2014–2018)
- NBA draft: 2018: undrafted
- Playing career: 2018–present

Career history
- 2018–2020: Bilbao
- 2020–2023: Alba Berlin
- 2023–2024: Gran Canaria
- 2024–2025: Andorra

Career highlights
- 2× Bundesliga champion (2021, 2022); German Cup winner (2022); ACC Defensive Player of the Year (2017); Second-team All-ACC (2017); 2× ACC All-Defensive Team (2017, 2018)

Benjamin William Lammers (born November 12, 1995) is an American professional basketball player who last played for MoraBanc Andorra of the Spanish Liga ACB. He played college basketball for the Georgia Tech Yellow Jackets.

== College career ==
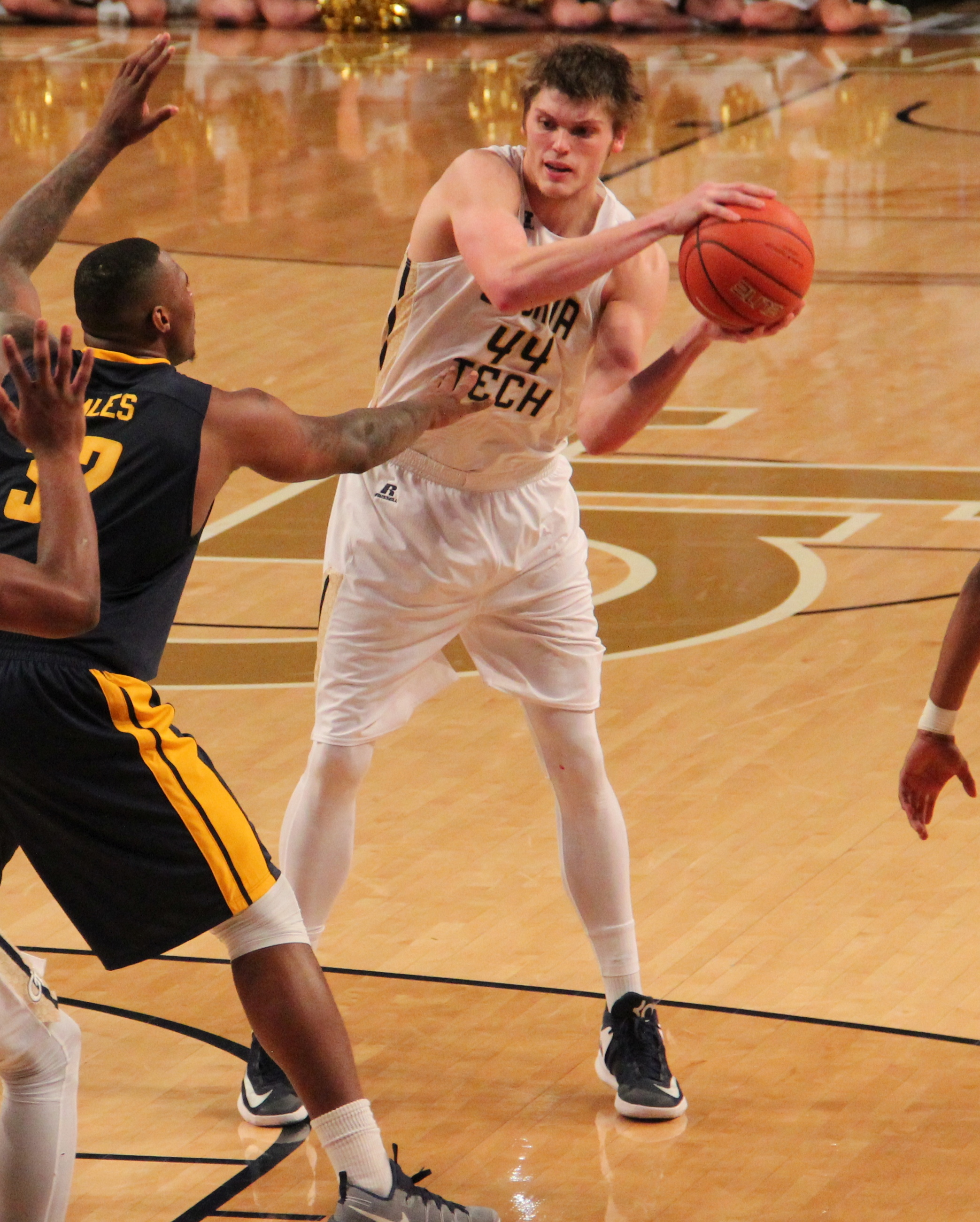
Lammers at Georgia Tech in 2016

Lammers came to Georgia Tech from Alamo Heights High School in San Antonio, Texas, earning All-State honors in each of his last three seasons. He chose the Yellow Jackets over Texas A&M, Miami, Marquette and Stanford. Lammers chose Georgia Tech in part for its excellence in mechanical engineering.

On the court, Lammers' basketball career started slowly. He was a reserve for his first two college seasons. But as a junior, under new Georgia Tech coach Josh Pastner, he became one of the most improved players of the 2016–17 season. After averaging 14.2 points, 9.2 rebounds and 3.2 blocks per game, Lammers was named second-team All-Atlantic Coast Conference and the ACC Defensive Player of the Year in 2017. Lammers' improved play and stellar defense were primary reasons that the Yellow Jackets performed above preseason expectations, making it to the championship game of the 2017 National Invitation Tournament.

== Professional career ==
Lammers attended the minicamp with the Charlotte Hornets but was cut prior to Summer League play. On August 22, 2018, Lammers signed with RETAbet Bilbao Basket of the LEB Oro. In his first season in Spain, Lammers averaged 10.1 points, 6.6 rebounds and 2.1 blocks per game in LEB Oro, helping team to a second place finish and promotion to Liga ACB. Lammers averaged 7.8 points, 4.8 rebounds and 1.9 blocks per game during the 2019–20 season in Liga ACB.

On July 10, 2020, Lammers signed a three-year deal with German club Alba Berlin, where he spent three seasons.

On August 1, 2023, Lammers signed a one-year deal with EuroCup champions CB Gran Canaria of the Spanish Liga ACB.

On July 3, 2024, he signed with MoraBanc Andorra of the Spanish Liga ACB. On October 28, 2024, Lammers received a Hoops Agents Player of the Week award for Round 5 as he had 15 points and 9 rebounds for his team's win.
