= Maodo Lô =

German basketball player (born 1992)

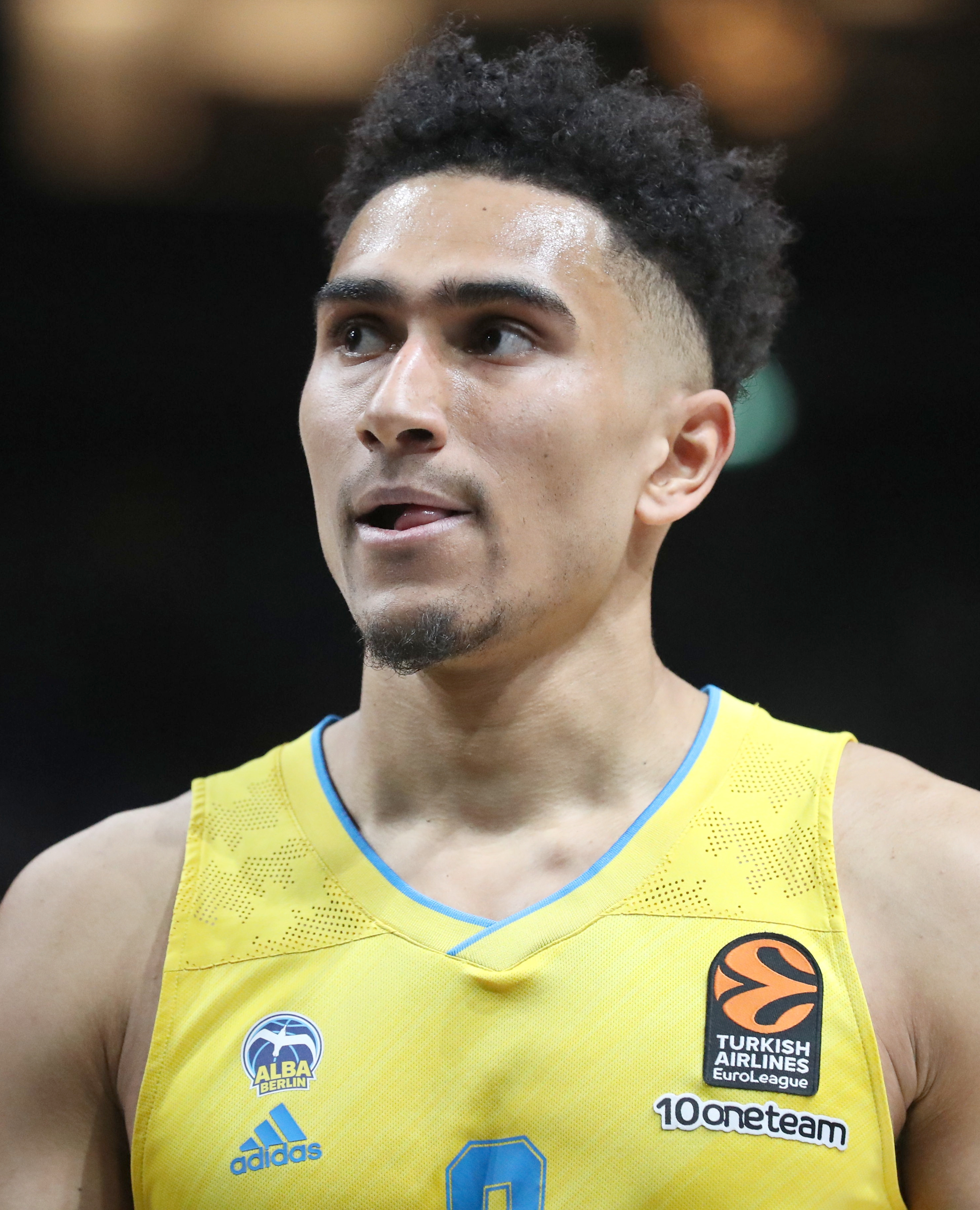
- Lô with Alba Berlin in 2022

No. 12 – Žalgiris Kaunas
- Position: Point guard / shooting guard
- League: LKL; EuroLeague

Personal information
- Born: 31 December 1992 (age 33) Berlin, Germany
- Listed height: 1.92 m (6 ft 4 in)
- Listed weight: 181 lb (82 kg)

Career information
- High school: Wilbraham & Monson Academy (Wilbraham, Massachusetts)
- College: Columbia (2012–2016)
- NBA draft: 2016: undrafted
- Playing career: 2016–present

Career history
- 2016–2018: Brose Bamberg
- 2018–2020: Bayern Munich
- 2020–2023: Alba Berlin
- 2023–2024: Olimpia Milano
- 2024–2025: Paris Basketball
- 2025–present: Žalgiris Kaunas

Career highlights
- LKL champion (2026); King Mindaugas Cup winner (2026); LBA champion (2024); 4× Bundesliga champion (2017, 2019, 2021, 2022); 2× German Cup winner (2017, 2022); All-Bundesliga First Team (2022); German Cup MVP (2022); CIT champion (2016); CIT MVP (2016); 2× First-team All-Ivy League (2015, 2016); Second-team All-Ivy League (2014)
Medals
Men's basketball
Representing Germany
FIBA World Cup
Gold medal – first place	2023 Philippines–Japan–Indonesia
EuroBasket
Gold medal – first place	2025 Cyprus–Finland–Poland–Latvia
Bronze medal – third place	2022 Czech Republic–Georgia–Italy–Germany
Universiade
Silver medal – second place	2015 Gwangju	Team

Maodo Lô (born 31 December 1992) is a German professional basketball player for Žalgiris Kaunas of the Lithuanian Basketball League (LKL) and the EuroLeague. He played college basketball for Columbia University in New York City, where he was nicknamed The Chairman.

== College career ==
He played college basketball for Columbia University of the Ivy League. He averaged 14.5 points per game during his four-year career. In 2016 he led Columbia to the CIT championship and was named MVP of the Tournament.

== Professional career ==
After going undrafted in the 2016 NBA draft, Lô joined the Philadelphia 76ers summer league team. He played for the Sixers team in the Las Vegas Summer League.

=== Brose Bamberg (2016–2018) ===
==== 2016–17 season ====
On 22 July 2016, Lô signed a contract with the German team Brose Bamberg. In his first season with Bamberg, Lô won the double, as he won the Basketball Bundesliga and the BBL-Pokal. In the EuroLeague, Lô averaged 5.3 points and 1.2 assists in 10.5 minutes per game.

==== 2017–18 season ====
In his second season with Brose, the team finished 4th in the regular season. In the semi-finals, Bamberg was eliminated by Bayern Munich.

=== Bayern Munich (2018–2020) ===
On 13 July 2018, Lô signed a two-year deal with the German team FC Bayern Munich.

=== Alba Berlin (2020–2023) ===
On 22 July 2020, he signed with Alba Berlin of the Basketball Bundesliga. Lô averaged 9.5 points and 3.1 assists per game. He signed a two-year extension with the team on 4 August 2021.

He won the 2021–22 BBL-Pokal with Alba, and was named the Cup's MVP.

=== Olimpia Milano (2023–2024) ===
On 15 July 2023, he signed a two-year, 1.000.000€ deal with Italian powerhouse Olimpia Milano.

=== Žalgiris Kaunas (2025–present) ===
On 22 July 2025, Lô signed one–year contract with Žalgiris Kaunas of the Lithuanian Basketball League (LKL) and the EuroLeague. On May 10, 2026, the team agreed to a contract extension with Lo for one more season with an option for an additional year.

== International career ==
In 2014, Lô was first selected for the German national basketball team. He was selected for the squad that participated at EuroBasket 2015 where he averaged 4.6 points, 1.2 rebounds and 1.4 assists per game. He also played for Germany at Eurobasket 2017 and EuroBasket 2022 and was part of the winning team in 2023 FIBA World Cup and EuroBasket 2025.

== Personal life ==
Lô is the son of a Senegalese father and internationally acclaimed German painter Elvira Bach.

== Career statistics ==
Legend
GP	Games played	GS	Games started	MPG	Minutes per game
FG%	Field-goal percentage	3P%	3-point field-goal percentage	FT%	Free-throw percentage
RPG	Rebounds per game	APG	Assists per game	SPG	Steals per game
BPG	Blocks per game	PPG	Points per game	PIR	Performance index rating
**Bold**	Career high

=== EuroLeague ===
*	Led the league

Year	Team	GP	GS	MPG	FG%	3P%	FT%	RPG	APG	SPG	BPG	PPG	PIR
2016–17	Bamberg	26	2	10.8	.466	.420	.667	1.2	1.2	.3	**.1**	5.3	4.0
2017–18	Bamberg	30	5	16.7	.444	.414	.786	1.4	1.8	.3	**.1**	6.9	4.1
2018–19	Bayern Munich	29	13	18.3	.445	.344	.786	1.5	1.9	**1.0**	**.1**	6.7	5.7
2019–20	Bayern Munich	28*	25	**24.3**	.411	.426	.742	1.9	3.3	.7	.0	9.0	6.1
2020–21	Alba Berlin	27	8	21.6	.433	.346	**.886**	1.3	3.1	.6	—	9.5	7.6
2021–22	Alba Berlin	**33**	**28**	24.2	**.472**	**.444**	.835	**2.3**	**3.7**	.8	.0	**13.3**	**14.8**
2022–23	Alba Berlin	26	19	21.9	.415	.354	.836	1.7	2.9	.6	—	11.6	10.6
2023–24	Olimpia Milano	21	10	19.3	.449	.103	.762	1.7	2.7	.5	—	7.6	7.8
2024–25	Paris Basketball	29	1	17.2	.459	.333	.778	1.5	2.1	.4	.0	10.0	8.0
2025–26	Žalgiris Kaunas	19	1	19.1	.398	.383	.821	2.2	2.4	.6	**.1**	6.9	6.8
Career		268	112	19.4	.441	.388	.811	1.6	2.5	.6	.0	8.8	7.7

=== Domestic leagues ===
Year	Team	League	GP	MPG	FG%	3P%	FT%	RPG	APG	SPG	BPG	PPG
2016–17	(Germany) Bamberg	BBL	40	17.2	.481	.452	.818	1.8	2.4	.5	.1	7.0
2017–18	(Germany) Bamberg	BBL	41	21.1	.466	.486	.873	1.7	2.1	.8	.1	8.7
2018–19	(Germany) Bayern Munich	BBL	41	19.5	.498	.381	.822	1.6	2.7	.7	.0	7.1
2019–20	(Germany) Bayern Munich	BBL	25	21.7	.454	.345	.868	2.3	3.4	1.1	.1	8.0
2020–21	(Germany) Alba Berlin	BBL	37	19.7	.460	.376	.805	1.9	3.6	.7	.0	9.2
2021–22	(Germany) Alba Berlin	BBL	39	20.8	.430	.368	.815	1.7	3.6	.6	—	9.4
2022–23	(Germany) Alba Berlin	BBL	29	21.4	.399	.321	.746	2.2	3.9	.8	.1	9.4
2023–24	(Italy) Olimpia Milano	LBA	14	18.9	.435	.364	.947	1.4	2.1	.4	.1	6.4
2024–25	(France) Paris Basketball	LNB Élite	29	17.3	.448	.393	.732	1.3	3.0	.6	.0	8.5

=== College ===
Year	Team	GP	GS	MPG	FG%	3P%	FT%	RPG	APG	SPG	BPG	PPG
2012–13	Columbia	24	15	20.0	.436	.300	.750	1.2	1.2	.8	.4	6.2
2013–14	Columbia	34	34	32.2	.479	**.447**	**.833**	3.8	2.1	1.2	.3	14.7
2014–15	Columbia	28	28	**34.2**	**.489**	.431	.769	**4.4**	2.3	1.5	**.6**	**18.4**
2015–16	Columbia	**35**	**35**	32.7	.454	.374	.703	3.9	**2.9**	**2.2**	.4	16.9
Career		121	112	30.4	.469	.400	.766	3.6	2.2	1.5	.4	14.5
