= Oscar da Silva =

German-Brazilian basketball player (born 1998)

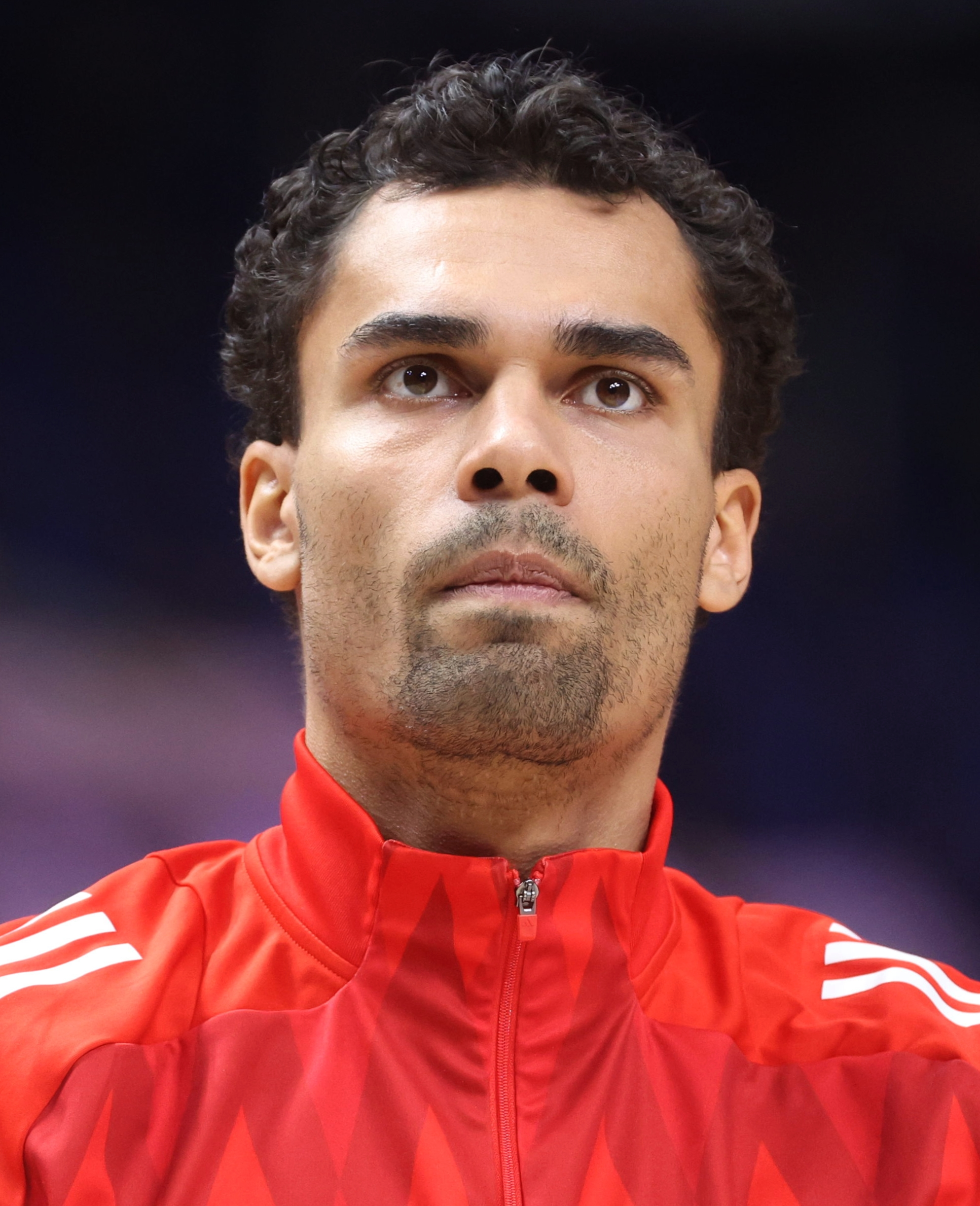
- Da Silva with Bayern Munich in 2025

No. 1 – Bayern Munich
- Position: Power forward / center
- League: BBL; EuroLeague

Personal information
- Born: 21 September 1998 (age 28) Munich, Germany
- Listed height: 2.06 m (6 ft 9 in)
- Listed weight: 104.5 kg (230 lb)

Career information
- High school: Ludwigsgymnasium (Munich, Germany)
- College: Stanford (2017–2021)
- NBA draft: 2021: undrafted
- Playing career: 2021–present

Career history
- 2021: Ludwigsburg
- 2021–2022: Alba Berlin
- 2022–2024: FC Barcelona
- 2024–present: Bayern Munich

Career highlights
- 2× German League champion (2022, 2025); German Cup winner (2022); Liga ACB champion (2023); 2× First-team All-Pac-12 (2020, 2021); Pac-12 All-Defensive Team (2021)
Medals
Men's basketball
Representing Germany
EuroBasket
Gold medal – first place	2025 Cyprus–Finland–Poland–Latvia

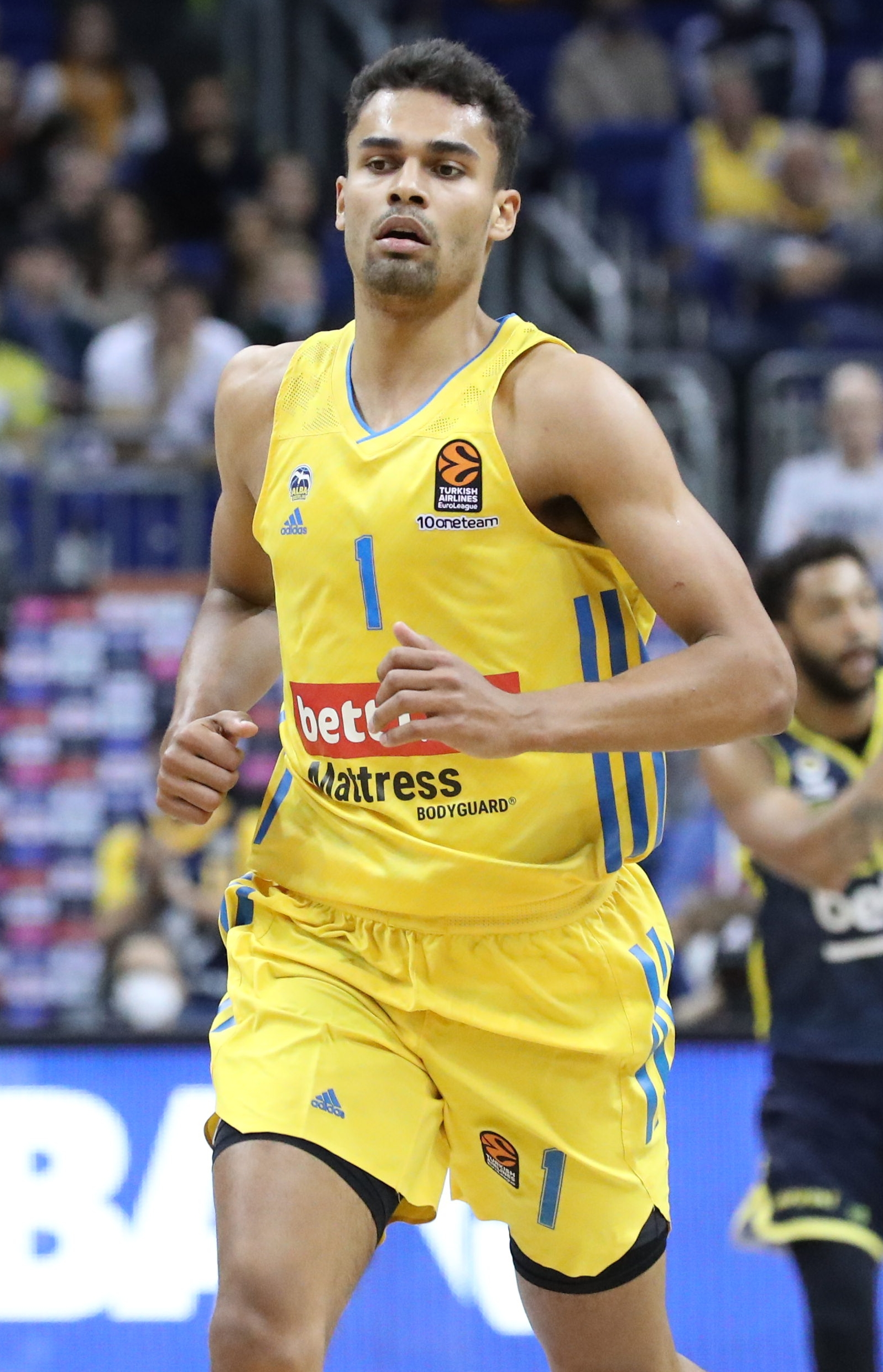
Da Silva with ALBA Berlin in 2021

Oscar Leon da Silva (born 21 September 1998) is a Brazilian-German professional basketball player for Bayern Munich of the German Basketball Bundesliga (BBL) and the EuroLeague. He played college basketball for the Stanford Cardinal.

== Early life and career ==
Da Silva was a standout for Ludwigsgymnasium in Munich and was also a member of the MTSV Schwabing in club play, where he averaged 21.0 points, 8.3 rebounds, 2.0 assists, 2.0 steals and 1.7 blocks per game in the 2016–17 season. He was selected for the NBBL All-Star Game. Da Silva also attended the Internationale Basketball Akademie München (IBAM). He signed with Stanford on October 25, 2016 despite not meeting coach Jerod Haase, choosing the Cardinal over offers from California and several Ivy League institutions.

== College career ==
After arriving at Stanford, da Silva injured an ankle in practice and missed a month. He averaged 6.2 points and 4.7 rebounds per game as a freshman. As a sophomore, he averaged 9.5 points and 6.0 rebounds per game. Da Silva scored a career high 27 points and had 15 rebounds and three assists on February 1, 2020, in a 70–60 upset of Oregon. As a result, he was named Pac-12 player of the week on February 3. On February 8, da Silva suffered a mild concussion and lacerated head that required stitches after a collision with Evan Battey of Colorado. At the conclusion of the regular season, da Silva was named first-team All-Pac-12. As a junior, da Silva averaged 15.7 points and 6.4 rebounds per game. He averaged 18.8 points and 6.8 rebounds per game as a senior. Da Silva was named to the first-team All-Pac-12 and the conference Scholar-Athlete of the Year.

== Professional career ==
On March 24, 2021, da Silva announced he had signed on to play for MHP Riesen Ludwigsburg of Germany's Basketball Bundesliga for the remainder of the 2021 season. Following that, he began training in preparation for the 2021 NBA draft.

After going undrafted in the 2021 NBA draft, da Silva joined the Oklahoma City Thunder for the 2021 NBA Summer League. On September 30, he signed with Alba Berlin until 2024. He won the German championship and the German cup title in 2022.

On July 11, 2022, he signed a three-year deal with FC Barcelona. On June 23, 2024, da Silva parted ways with the Catalan powerhouse.

On July 4, 2024, da Silva returned to the Bundesliga for Bayern Munich on a three-year deal.

In March 2025, da Silva had surgery on his right knee and would remain sidelined for several weeks. He suffered a medial ligament injury in his right knee during the Euroleague game against Paris.

== National team career ==
In 2016, da Silva played for Germany at the Albert Schweitzer Tournament, an international U18 tournament in Mannheim, Germany. He averaged seven points, 5.4 rebounds and 1.7 blocks per game and won the gold medal. Later in the year, da Silva averaged 9.5 points and six rebounds per game for Germany at the 2016 FIBA U18 European Championship in Samsun, Turkey, leading his team to a fourth-place finish. He helped Germany to fifth place at the 2017 FIBA Under-19 World Cup in Cairo, averaging 10.3 points and four rebounds per game. On August 5, 2023, da Silva premiered for the German national team in a friendly game against Sweden where he scored 9 points.

== Career statistics ==
Legend
GP	Games played	GS	Games started	MPG	Minutes per game
FG%	Field-goal percentage	3P%	3-point field-goal percentage	FT%	Free-throw percentage
RPG	Rebounds per game	APG	Assists per game	SPG	Steals per game
BPG	Blocks per game	PPG	Points per game	PIR	Performance index rating
**Bold**	Career high

=== EuroLeague ===
Year	Team	GP	GS	MPG	FG%	3P%	FT%	RPG	APG	SPG	BPG	PPG	PIR
2021–22	Alba Berlin	33	10	**18.4**	**.558**	.256	**.717**	**3.5**	**.8**	**.9**	**.6**	**8.8**	**9.7**
2022–23	Barcelona	27	0	12.2	.459	**.300**	.640	2.6	.2	.3	.1	2.9	3.1
2023–24	Barcelona	**37**	**20**	14.6	.482	.242	.600	2.7	.4	.6	.3	3.4	4.1
Career		97	30	15.3	.521	.261	.673	2.9	.5	.6	.3	5.1	5.7

=== Domestic leagues ===
Year	Team	League	GP	MPG	FG%	3P%	FT%	RPG	APG	SPG	BPG	PPG
2020–21	(Germany) Riesen Ludwigsburg	BBL	17	13.7	.540	.261	.667	3.2	.5	.3	.6	6.6
2021–22	(Germany) Alba Berlin	BBL	41	20.2	.631	.462	.782	5.2	1.1	1.0	1.1	11.3
2022–23	(Spain) Barcelona	ACB	27	17.4	.534	.390	.615	3.6	.6	.5	.4	5.8
2023–24	(Spain) Barcelona	ACB	37	16.3	.603	.343	.644	2.7	.5	.6	.4	5.7

=== College ===
Year	Team	GP	GS	MPG	FG%	3P%	FT%	RPG	APG	SPG	BPG	PPG
2017–18	Stanford	**35**	11	24.1	.517	**.558**	.636	4.7	1.1	.4	.9	6.2
2018–19	Stanford	31	**31**	28.3	.467	.257	.683	6.0	1.8	.7	**1.3**	9.5
2019–20	Stanford	31	**31**	28.6	.570	.317	.771	6.4	1.5	**1.1**	.8	15.7
2020–21	Stanford	23	23	**32.3**	**.580**	.302	**.787**	**6.8**	**2.4**	.9	1.0	**18.8**
Career		120	96	27.9	.539	.337	.743	5.9	1.7	.8	1.0	12.0

== Personal life ==
Da Silva has a Brazilian father and German mother. His father was a professional boxer before immigrating to Germany in the 1990s and owns a Brazilian restaurant in Munich. Da Silva has a younger brother, Tristan, who currently plays basketball for the Orlando Magic of the National Basketball Association. At Stanford University, he was a biology major and has carried out stem cell research. He is fluent in five languages: English, French, German, Portuguese, and Spanish. Da Silva's favorite player is Kevin Durant.
