= Hamburg Towers =

Professional basketball team in Hamburg, Germany

Veolia Towers Hamburg
- Leagues: Basketball Bundesliga
- Founded: 2013; 13 years ago
- Arena: Inselpark Arena; Barclays Arena
- Capacity: 3,400; 13,000 (Basketball)
- Location: Hamburg, Germany
- Team colors: White, black, sky blue
- Main sponsor: Veolia
- President: Jan Fischer; Marvin Willoughby
- Team manager: Marvin Willoughby
- Head coach: Benka Barloschky
- Team captain: Benedikt Turudic
- Affiliation: SC Rist Wedel
- Championships: 1 ProA
- Website: www.hamburgtowers.de
First	Second	Third

Hamburg Towers, for sponsorship reasons named Veolia Towers Hamburg, is a professional basketball club based in Hamburg, Germany. After promotion from the ProA in 2019, the Towers are currently playing in the Basketball Bundesliga, the top tier of German basketball.

Founded in 2013, the club played in the ProA from the 2014–15 season. In 2019, Hamburg promoted to the BBL for the first time. Since 2014, their home arena is the Inselpark Arena in Wilhelmsburg. It has capacity for 3,400 people.

== History ==
In February 2013, former player Pascal Roller and entrepreneur Wolfgang Sahm announced their plans to bring back professional basketball to Hamburg. There had been no professional basketball in the city since the bankruptcy of BCJ Hamburg in 2002. The original goal of the club was to obtain a wild card for the first tier Basketball Bundesliga. However, the team was given a spot in the second tier ProA.

The club debuted in the 2014–15 ProA season. It played its first home game on 28 September 2014, and won 66–65 over Gießen 46ers. In its debut season, the team ended eight in the standings. In the 2015–16 season, the Towers had the highest average attendance of all ProA clubs with 3,047 per game.

In the 2018–19 season, Hamburg finished the regular season in the fourth place. On 30 April 2019, Hamburg Towers promoted to the Basketball Bundesliga for the first time after defeating first-seeded Chemnitz Niners in the playoffs semifinals, and thus reaching the ProA Finals. On 4 May 2019, the team won the ProA championship after defeating Nürnberg Falcons in the second leg.

== Sponsorships ==
In 2022, the Towers signed a sponsorship agreement with Veolia to become their name sponsor in the 2022–23 season.

== Season by season ==
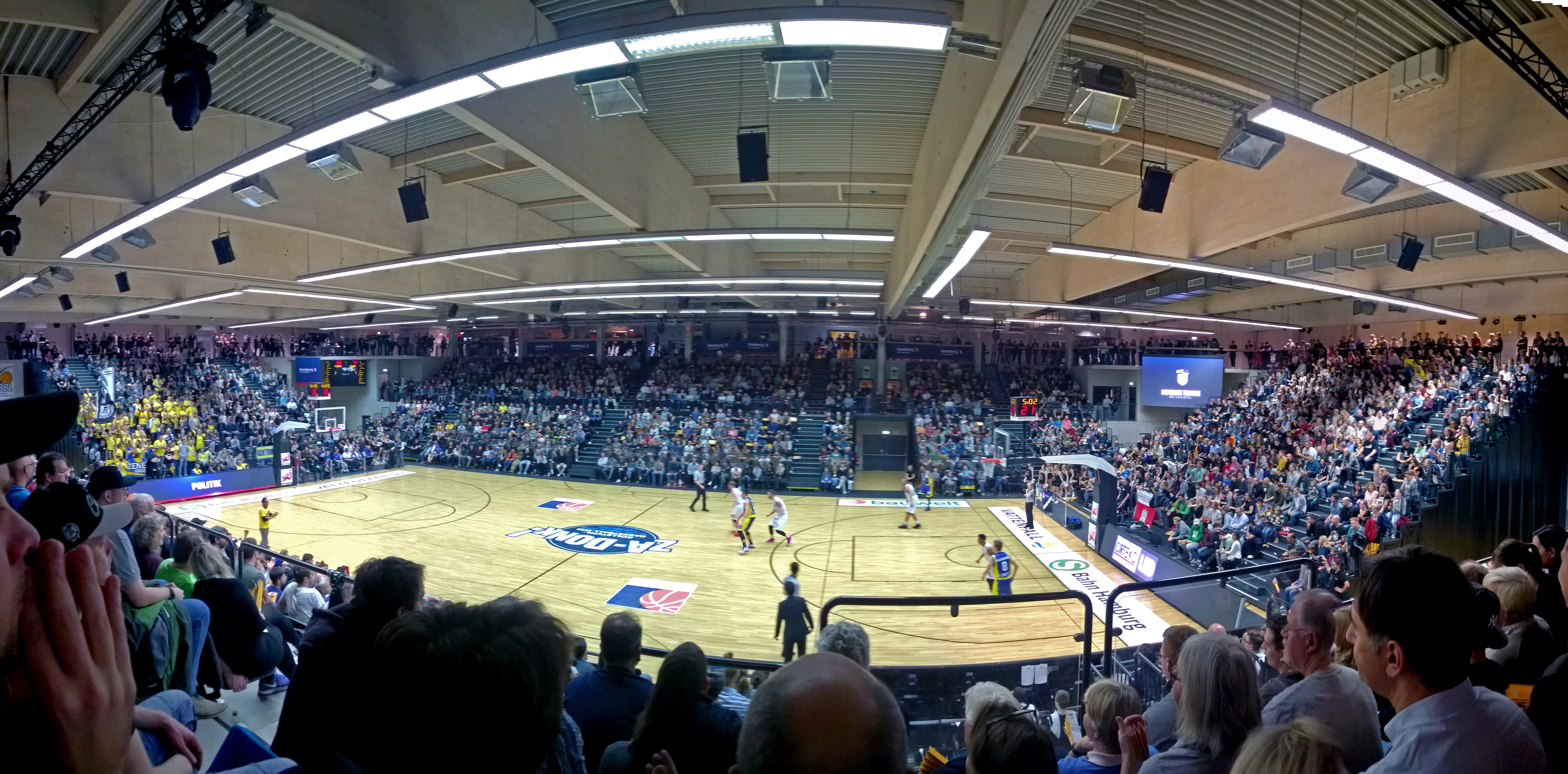
Towers home game in the 2016–17 season

Season	Tier	Division	Pos.	W–L	Playoffs	German Cup	European competitions	
2014–15	2	ProA	8th	15–18	DNQ			
2015–16	2	ProA	5th					
2016–17	2	ProA	9th	14–16	DNQ			
2017–18	2	ProA	10th	13–17	DNQ			
2018–19	2	ProA	1st	26–15	Winners			
2019–20	1	BBL	17th	3–17	DNQ			
2020–21	1	BBL	7th	21–13	Quarterfinals (lost to Berlin)			
2021–22	1	BBL	7th	19–15	Quarterfinals (lost to Bonn)	Round of 16	EuroCup	Eighthfinals
2022–23	1	BBL	15th	12–22	DNQ	Round of 16	EuroCup	Eighthfinals
2023–24	1	BBL	9th	17–17	Play-in (won against Oldenburg, lost to Ludwigsburg)	Round of 16	EuroCup	Regular season
2024–25	1	BBL	13th	15–17	DNQ	First round	EuroCup	Regular season
2025–26	1	BBL	14th	13–21	DNQ	First round	EuroCup	Regular season
2026–27	1	BBL				Round of 16		

== Honours ==
Titles

- ProA
  - Winners: 2018–19

== Players ==
=== Current roster ===
Note: Flags indicate national team eligibility at FIBA-sanctioned events. Players may hold other non-FIBA nationalities not displayed.

Veolia Towers Hamburg roster
Players
Coaches

Pos.	No.	Nat.	Name	Ht.	Age
G	1	(Canada)	Blair, Jahvon	1.93 m (6 ft 4 in)	28 – 27 March 1998
PG	2	(United States)	Thomasson, Noah	1.93 m (6 ft 4 in)	25 – 4 June 2001
G	3	(Germany) (Nigeria)	Rich Igbineweka, Osaro Jürgen	1.88 m (6 ft 2 in)	28 – 22 July 1998
F	4	(United States)	Gary, Juwan	1.98 m (6 ft 6 in)	25 – 17 February 2001
PG	5	(United States)	Zeigler, Zakai	1.75 m (5 ft 9 in)	24 – 2 August 2002
SF	7	(United States)	Wade, Trey	1.98 m (6 ft 6 in)	28 – 28 July 1998
SG	10	(Germany)	Martin, Nelson	1.90 m (6 ft 3 in)	20 – 25 April 2006
G	11	(United States)	Muttilib, Jamil	1.98 m (6 ft 6 in)	22 – 3 September 2004
F/C	13	(Thailand) (Germany)	Breunig, Martin	2.03 m (6 ft 8 in)	34 – 18 February 1992
PF	19	(Germany)	Theis, Sid-Marlon	2.05 m (6 ft 9 in)	33 – 26 April 1993
F	20	(Germany)	Marshall, Emil	1.98 m (6 ft 6 in)	26 – 20 April 2000
C	22	(France)	Pavrette, Nicholas	2.13 m (7 ft 0 in)	24 – 6 August 2002
G/F	25	(Germany)	Ogbe, Kenneth	1.98 m (6 ft 6 in)	32 – 16 November 1994
SG	28	(France)	Kangudia, Mathys	1.88 m (6 ft 2 in)	22 – 25 August 2004
F	55	(Canada)	Muenkat, David	2.01 m (6 ft 7 in)	26 – 2 July 2000

Head coach

- (Germany) Benka Barloschky

Assistant coach(es)

- (Germany) Stanley Witt
- (Germany) Jacob Hollatz

Legend

- (C) Team captain
- Injured

- Roster
Updated: November 1, 2026

== Notable players ==
Note: Flags indicate national team eligibility at FIBA-sanctioned events. Players may hold other non-FIBA nationalities not displayed.

Criteria

To appear in this section a player must have either:

- Set a club record or won an individual award while at the club
- Played at least one official international match for their national team at any time
- Played at least one official NBA match at any time.

- (Germany) Louis Olinde
- (Germany) Heiko Schaffartzik
- (Germany) Len Schoormann
- (Austria) Marvin Ogunsipe
- (Bosnia and Herzegovina) Adin Vrabac
- (Estonia) Maik-Kalev Kotsar
- (Mexico) Jorge Gutiérrez
- (Netherlands) Yannick Franke
- (Poland) Aleksander Dziewa
- (Slovenia) Žiga Samar
- (Switzerland) Anthony Polite
- (Venezuela) Michael Carrera
- (United States) Beau Beech
- (United States) Pat Spencer
- (United States) James Woodard

== Head coaches ==
#	Name	Period	Honours
1	(Germany) Hamed Attarbashi	2014 – February 2018	
2	(Germany) Benka Barloschky	February – May 2018	
3	(United States) Mike Taylor	May 2018 – June 2020	ProA (2019)
4	(Spain) Pedro Calles	August 2020 – June 2022	
5	(Austria) Raoul Korner	June 2022 – January 2023	
6	(Germany) Benka Barloschky	January 2023 – present	

== Arena ==
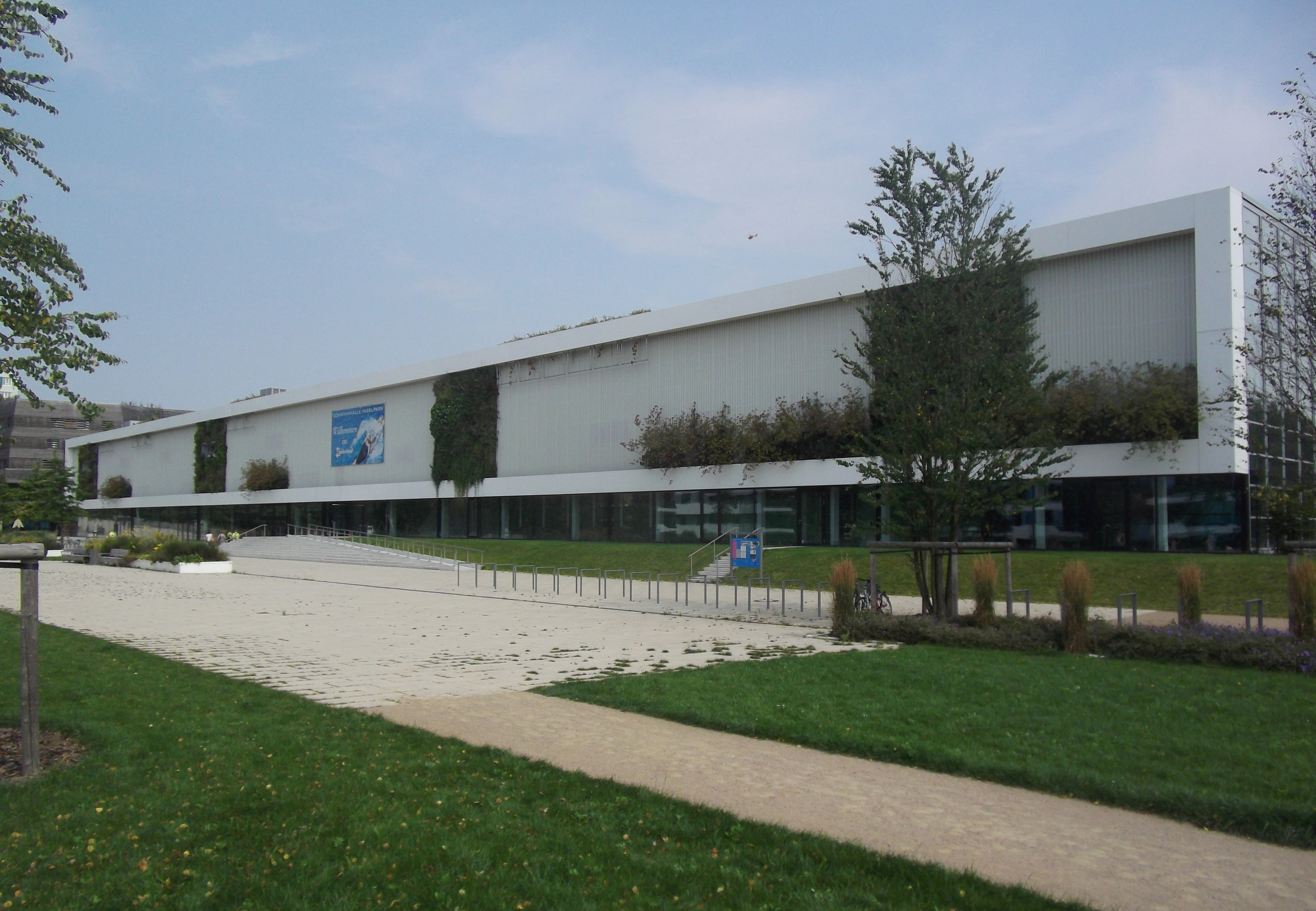
Inselparkhalle in 2015

Since 2014 Hamburg Towers hosted their guests at the Inselpark Arena (capacity: 3,400). In the 2023/2024 and 2024/2025 seasons, Towers hosted Bayern Munich at the Barclays Arena (capacity: 13,000). In the 2025/2026 season, Towers hosted Alba Berlin and Bayern Munich at the Barclays Arena. On March 29, 2026, a new attendance record was set for Hamburg Towers' home games at the Hamburg Towers vs. Bayern Munich match in the Barclays Arena, with 12,570 spectators watching the game.

== Player development ==
ProB team Rist Wedel has been Hamburg's cooperation partner for player development.
