= Len Schoormann =

German basketball player (born 2002)

No. 0 – Nanterre 92
- Position: Point guard
- League: LNB Élite; Champions League

Personal information
- Born: 25 July 2002 (age 24) Darmstadt, Germany
- Listed height: 1.93 m (6 ft 4 in)
- Listed weight: 83 kg (183 lb)

Career information
- Playing career: 2017–present

Career history
- 2017–2023: Skyliners Frankfurt
- 2017–2020: →Skyliners Juniors
- 2022–2023: →Hamburg Towers
- 2023–2025: Baskets Oldenburg
- 2025–2026: Ratiopharm Ulm
- 2026–present: Nanterre 92

Len Adam Schoormann (born 25 July 2002) is a German professional basketball player for Nanterre 92 of the French LNB Élite and the Champions League.

== Early life and youth career ==
Schoormann was born in Darmstadt to a Kenyan father and a German mother and grew up in Erzhausen. He focused on tennis in his childhood, and he started playing basketball at age six in primary school. At age eight, Schoormann competed for SG Weiterstadt, before moving to BC Darmstadt. In 2016, he joined the youth division of Skyliners Frankfurt, while attending the Carl von Weinberg School. Two years later, Schoormann was named most valuable player of the Jugend Basketball Bundesliga, the German under-16 league. At age 15, he began playing in the Nachwuchs Basketball Bundesliga, the German under-19 league.

== Professional career ==
Schoormann made his ProB debut for Skyliners Juniors in the 2017–18 season. On 17 November 2019, at age 17, he made his Basketball Bundesliga (BBL) debut for Skyliners Frankfurt in a loss to s.Oliver Würzburg. Schoormann joined the team's rotation at the 2020 BBL Final Tournament, scoring a season-high nine points in a loss to Brose Bamberg on 13 June. In 12 appearances during the 2019–20 BBL season, he averaged 2.8 points in 9.8 minutes per game.

On 15 July 2022, Schoormann joined fellow Bundesliga side Hamburg Towers on loan.

On 26 June 2023, he signed with Baskets Oldenburg of the Basketball Bundesliga.

On July 3, 2025, he signed with Ratiopharm Ulm of the German Basketball Bundesliga.

On December 9, 2025, he signed with Nanterre 92 of the French LNB Élite.

== National team career ==
Schoormann represented Germany at the 2017 FIBA U16 European Championship in Podgorica, averaging 6.9 points per game for the 13th place team. He missed much of the 2019 FIBA U18 European Championship with an ankle injury. The team finished in eleventh place.
