= Jaleen Smith =

American basketball player (born 1994)

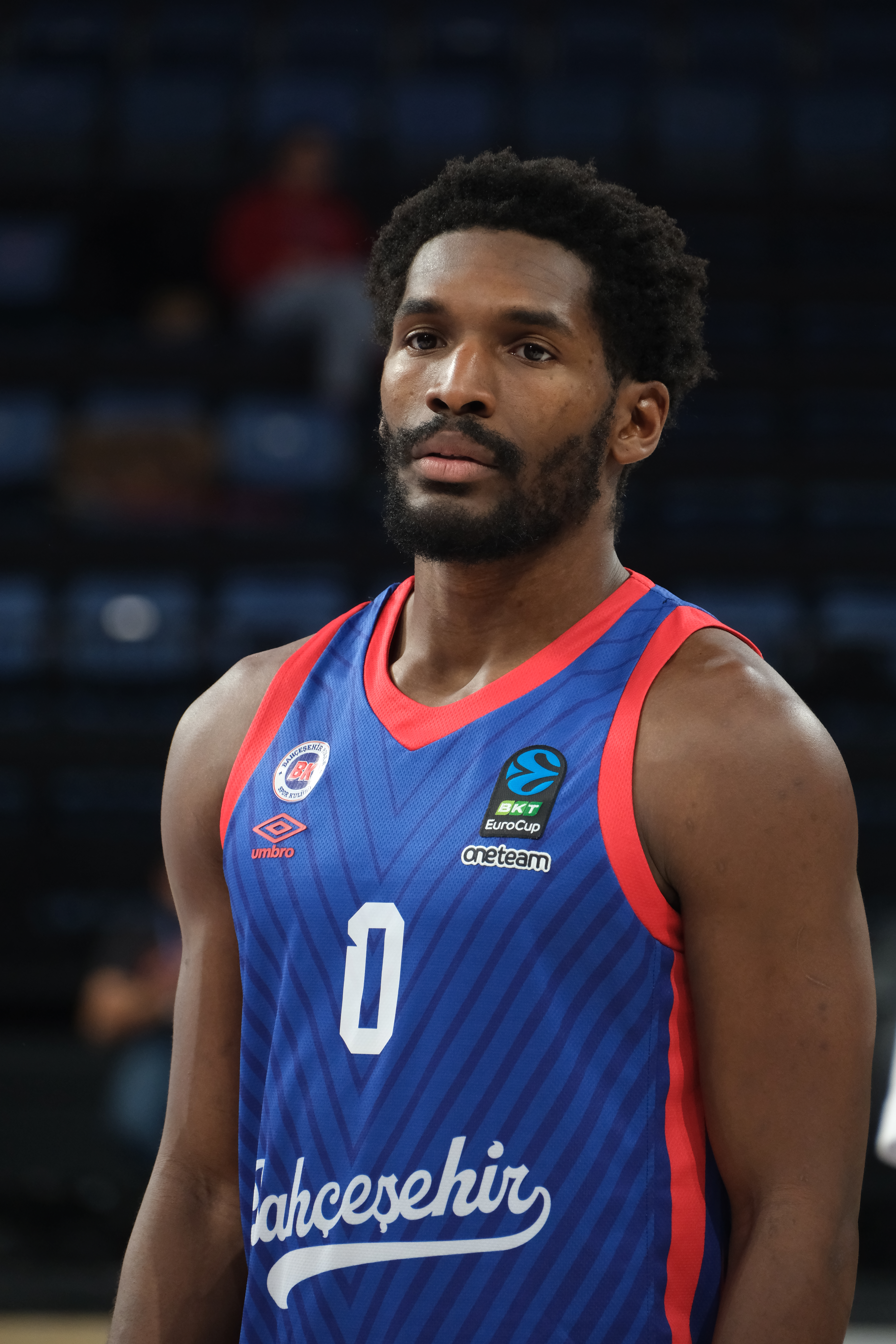
- Smith with Bahçeşehir Koleji in 2025

No. 3 – Hapoel Jerusalem
- Position: Shooting guard / point guard
- League: Israeli Basketball Premier League; EuroCup

Personal information
- Born: November 24, 1994 (age 31) Freeport, Texas, U.S.
- Listed height: 1.93 m (6 ft 4 in)
- Listed weight: 205 lb (93 kg)

Career information
- High school: Brazosport (Freeport, Texas)
- College: New Hampshire (2013–2017)
- NBA draft: 2017: undrafted
- Playing career: 2017–present

Career history
- 2017–2019: USC Heidelberg
- 2019–2021: Riesen Ludwigsburg
- 2021–2023: Alba Berlin
- 2023: Virtus Bologna
- 2023–2024: Partizan
- 2024–2025: Bahçeşehir Koleji
- 2025–2026: Türk Telekom
- 2026–present: Hapoel Jerusalem

Career highlights
- All-EuroCup First Team (2025); German League champion (2022); German Cup winner (2022); Bundesliga MVP (2021); All-Bundesliga First Team (2021); Italian Supercup winner (2023); 2× Second-team All-America East (2016, 2017)

Jaleen Devon Smith (born November 24, 1994) is an American-born naturalized Croatian professional basketball player for Hapoel Jerusalem of the Israeli Basketball Premier League and the EuroCup. He played college basketball for the New Hampshire Wildcats.

== Early life ==
Smith was born on November 24, 1994 in Texas, to Andre Smith and Kadrean Williams.

== High school ==
Smith attended Brazosport High School in his hometown of Freeport, Texas, where he played basketball. In 2010-11 as a sophomore he was 1st Team District 23-4A. In 2011-12 as a junior he was again 1st Team District 23-4A, with 17 points, 10 rebounds, and 6 assists per game. In 2012-13 as a senior he was1st Team All-State as well as yet again 1st Team District 24-4A, and named Defensive Player of the Year and a Texas Association of Basketball Coaches All-Star, with 19 points, 8 rebounds, and 6 assists per game.

== College career ==
He went on to play four seasons of college basketball at guard at the University of New Hampshire for the Wildcats, in the America East Conference.

In his freshman year in 2013-14, in 28 games he averaged 20.6 minutes, 5.3 points, 2.8 rebounds, and 1.3 assists per game. In his sophomore season in 2014-15, in 32 games he averaged 31.7 minutes, 10.7 points, 5.2 rebounds (9th in the conference), 2.8 assists (6th), and 1.3 steals per game (8th), while shooting 80.5% (3rd) from the free throw line.

In his junior season in 2015-16, in 30 games he shot 90.0% from the free throw line, leading the conference, and 6th in the nation. He averaged 34.6 minutes, 13.4 points (8th in the conference), 5.5 rebounds, 3.4 assists (6th), and 0.9 steals per game. He was named 2015-16 America East All-Conference Second Team, and 2015-16 All-Northern New England College Basketball Second Team.

In his senior season in 2016-17, in 32 games he averaged 36.2 minutes, 15.8 points (8th in the conference), 6.4 rebounds (7th), 4.3 assists (3rd), 0.9 steals, and 0.6 blocks (8th) per game, while shooting 46.6% (4th) from the floor. He was named 2016-17 America East All-Conference Second Team.

He finished his college career as the Wildcats all-time leader in games played (122). He also ranked 5th in points scored (1,397) and assists (364). Smith became the first player in Wildcats history to record more than 1,000 points, 260 assists, and 600 rebounds.

== Professional career ==
=== USC Heidelberg (2017–2019) ===
After graduating in 2017, Smith started his professional career by signing with German second division club USC Heidelberg on July 2, 2017. In 2017-18 in 34 games he averaged 21.8 minutes, 7.6 points, 2.9 rebounds, 2.8 assists, and 1.0 steals, while shooting 80.3% from the free throw line.

In 2018-19 in 37 games he averaged 29.4 minutes, 12.7points, 4.1 rebounds, 2.7 assists, and 1.5 steals, while shooting 50.7% from the floor and 84.2% from the free throw line.

=== Riesen Ludwigsburg (2019–2021) ===
On July 21, 2019, Smith moved to Riesen Ludwigsburg of the top-tier Basketball Bundesliga, signing a one-year deal. In 2019-20 in 31 games he averaged 30.1 minutes, 10.6 points, 3.4 rebounds, 2.7 assists, and 1.6 steals, while shooting 83.3% from the free throw line.

In 2020-21 in 44 games he averaged 33.6 minutes, 15.2 points, 5.2 rebounds, 5.3 assists, and 1.8 steals, while shooting 87.3% from the free throw line. For the 2020–21 Basketball Bundesliga season, Smith was elected Most Valuable Player.

=== Alba Berlin (2021–2023) ===
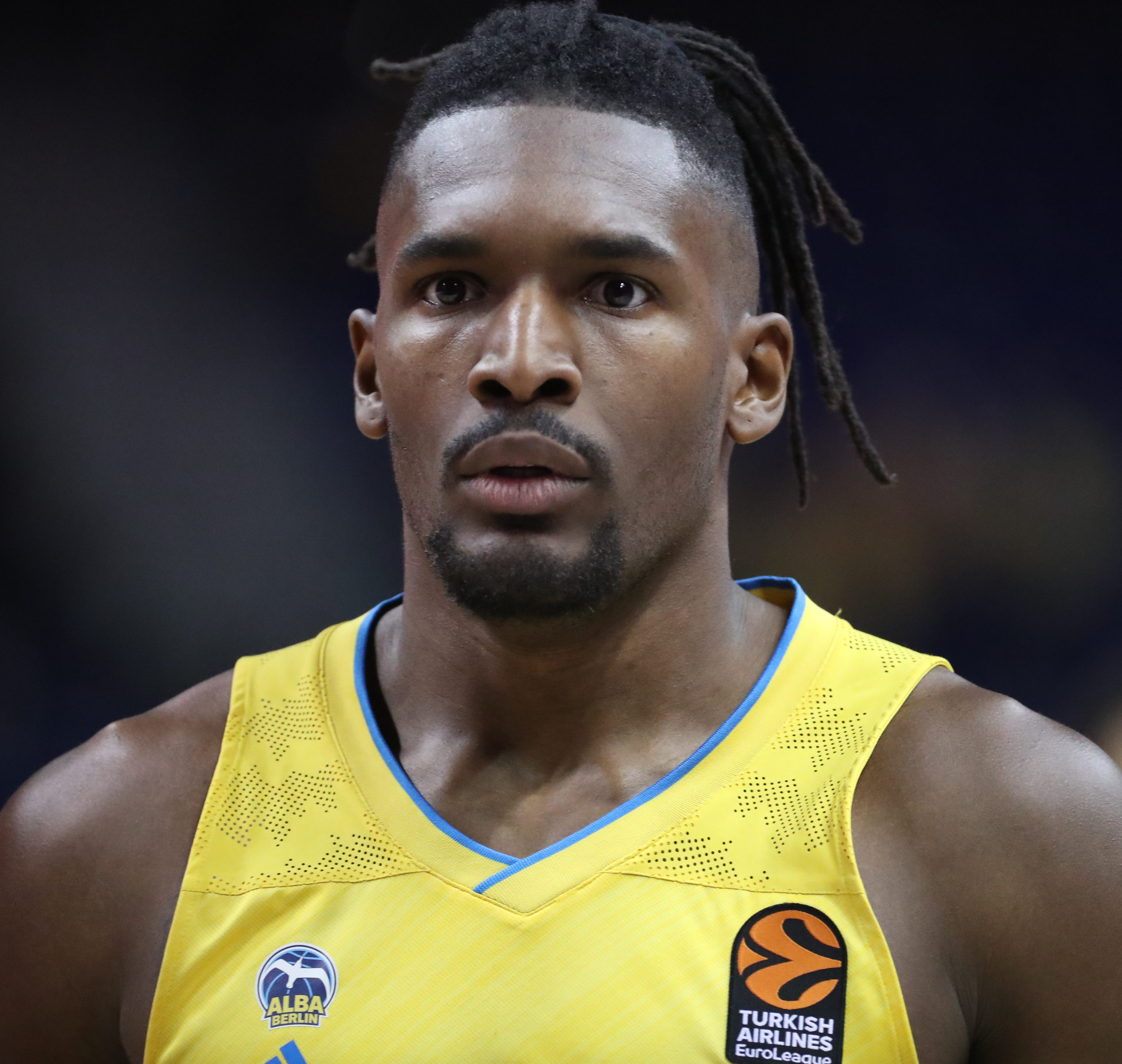
Smith with Alba Berlin in 2021

On August 25, 2021, Smith signed a three-year deal with Alba Berlin. In 2021-22 in 77 games he averaged 22.4 minutes, 9.9 points, 2.6 rebounds,2.9 assists, and 0.8 steals, while shooting 92.4% from the free throw line.

In 2022-23 in 65 games he averaged 23.3 minutes, 12.7 points, 2.6 rebounds,2.8 assists, and 0.9 steals, while shooting 92.4% from the free throw line.

=== Virtus Bologna (2023) ===
On July 20, 2023, Smith signed a two-year contract with Virtus Bologna of the Lega Basket Serie A (LBA) and the EuroLeague. On September 24, 2023, after having ousted Olimpia Milano in the semifinals, Virtus won its fourth Supercup, and the third in a row, defeating 97–60 Germani Brescia. By mutual agreement, Smith parted ways with Virtus Bologna mid-season, to join another club. In 13 EuroLeague games with Bologna, he averaged 5.3 points and 1.5 rebounds per game.

=== Partizan (2023–2024) ===
On December 24, 2023, Smith signed a one-year contract with Partizan of the Basketball League of Serbia (KLS), the Adriatic League and the EuroLeague.

=== Bahçeşehir Koleji (2024–2025) ===
On July 13, 2024, he signed with Bahçeşehir Koleji of the Basketbol Süper Ligi (BSL). In 2024-25 in 58 games he averaged 26.3 minutes, 10.7 points, 2.8 rebounds,4.9 assists, and 1.1 steals, while shooting 87.8% from the free throw line. Smith averaged 12.4 points, 2.7 rebounds, 5.5 assists, and 1.1 steals per game.

=== Türk Telekom (2025–2026) ===
On July 3, 2025, he signed with Türk Telekom of the Turkish Basketbol Süper Ligi (BSL). In 2025-26 in 54 games he averaged 26.1 minutes, 12.5 points, 2.2 rebounds, 3.5 assists, and 1.0 steals, while shooting 86.6% from the free throw line.

=== Hapoel Jerusalem (2026–present) ===
On June 17, 2026, Smith signed with Hapoel Jerusalem of the Israeli Basketball Premier League.

== National team career ==
In July 2022, the Croatian Basketball Federation expressed interest in naturalizing Smith, so he could represent the Croatia national team at the EuroBasket 2022. In August 2022, Smith debuted for Croatia in a friendly against Bulgaria. His first official game was a EuroBasket 2025 pre-qualifier against Poland. Smith was the third naturalized American to play for Croatia, after Dontaye Draper and Oliver Lafayette.

== Career statistics ==
Legend
GP	Games played	GS	Games started	MPG	Minutes per game
FG%	Field-goal percentage	3P%	3-point field-goal percentage	FT%	Free-throw percentage
RPG	Rebounds per game	APG	Assists per game	SPG	Steals per game
BPG	Blocks per game	PPG	Points per game	PIR	Performance index rating
**Bold**	Career high

=== EuroLeague ===
Year	Team	GP	GS	MPG	FG%	3P%	FT%	RPG	APG	SPG	BPG	PPG	PIR
2021–22	Alba Berlin	**33**	17	21.0	.362	.317	.933	2.2	2.3	**.8**	.1	8.3	6.6
2022–23	Alba Berlin	31	**27**	**24.6**	.408	.374	.836	**2.7**	**2.6**	**.8**	**.2**	**11.5**	**10.7**
2023–24	Virtus Bologna	13	2	11.3	**.480**	**.483**	.875	1.5	.8	.5	.1	5.3	4.6
2023–24	Partizan	7	2	18.1	.472	.389	**1.000**	1.7	1.3	.7	.1	6.7	6.6
Career		84	48	20.4	.398	.361	.876	2.2	2.1	.7	.1	8.9	7.8

=== Domestic leagues ===
Year	Team	League	GP	MPG	FG%	3P%	FT%	RPG	APG	SPG	BPG	PPG
2017–18	(Germany) Heidelberg	ProA	34	21.8	.389	.314	.803	2.9	2.8	1.0	.1	7.6
2018–19	(Germany) Heidelberg	ProA	37	29.4	.507	.394	.842	4.1	2.7	1.5	.2	12.7
2019–20	(Germany) Riesen Ludwigsburg	BBL	30	30.1	.417	.327	.828	3.4	2.7	1.7	.1	10.7
2020–21	(Germany) Riesen Ludwigsburg	BBL	41	33.4	.410	.327	.875	5.0	5.3	1.8	.3	15.2
2021–22	(Germany) Alba Berlin	BBL	40	22.9	.429	.387	.908	2.8	3.4	.7	.2	10.8
2022–23	(Germany) Alba Berlin	BBL	32	21.7	.485	.447	.903	2.4	3.1	1.0	.2	13.2
2023–24	(Italy) Virtus Bologna	LBA	9	18.2	.449	.308	1.000	1.7	1.9	.9	—	6.7
2023–24	(Serbia) Partizan	KLS	4	14.9	.500	.471	.750	1.2	.7	.2	—	9.2
2023–24	(Serbia) Partizan	ABA	18	20.8	.451	.397	.667	2.3	2.3	1.1	.1	7.6
2024–25	(Turkey) Bahçeşehir Koleji	BSL	29	26.4	.458	.414	.792	2.8	5.2	1.2	—	10.5
2025–26	(Turkey) Türk Telekom	BSL	28	26.5	.366	.367	.917	2.6	3.6	1.0	—	12.2

=== College ===
Year	Team	GP	GS	MPG	FG%	3P%	FT%	RPG	APG	SPG	BPG	PPG
2013–14	New Hampshire	28	12	20.6	.329	.301	.773	2.8	1.3	.5	.2	5.3
2014–15	New Hampshire	**32**	**32**	31.7	.415	.326	.805	5.2	2.8	**1.3**	.3	10.7
2015–16	New Hampshire	30	29	34.6	.407	**.367**	**.900**	5.5	3.4	.9	.4	13.4
2016–17	New Hampshire	**32**	31	**36.2**	**.466**	.358	.781	**6.4**	**4.3**	.9	**.6**	**15.8**
Career		122	104	31.0	.420	.343	.824	5.0	3.0	.9	.4	11.5
