= Yorman Polas Bartolo =

Cuban-German basketball player (born 1985)

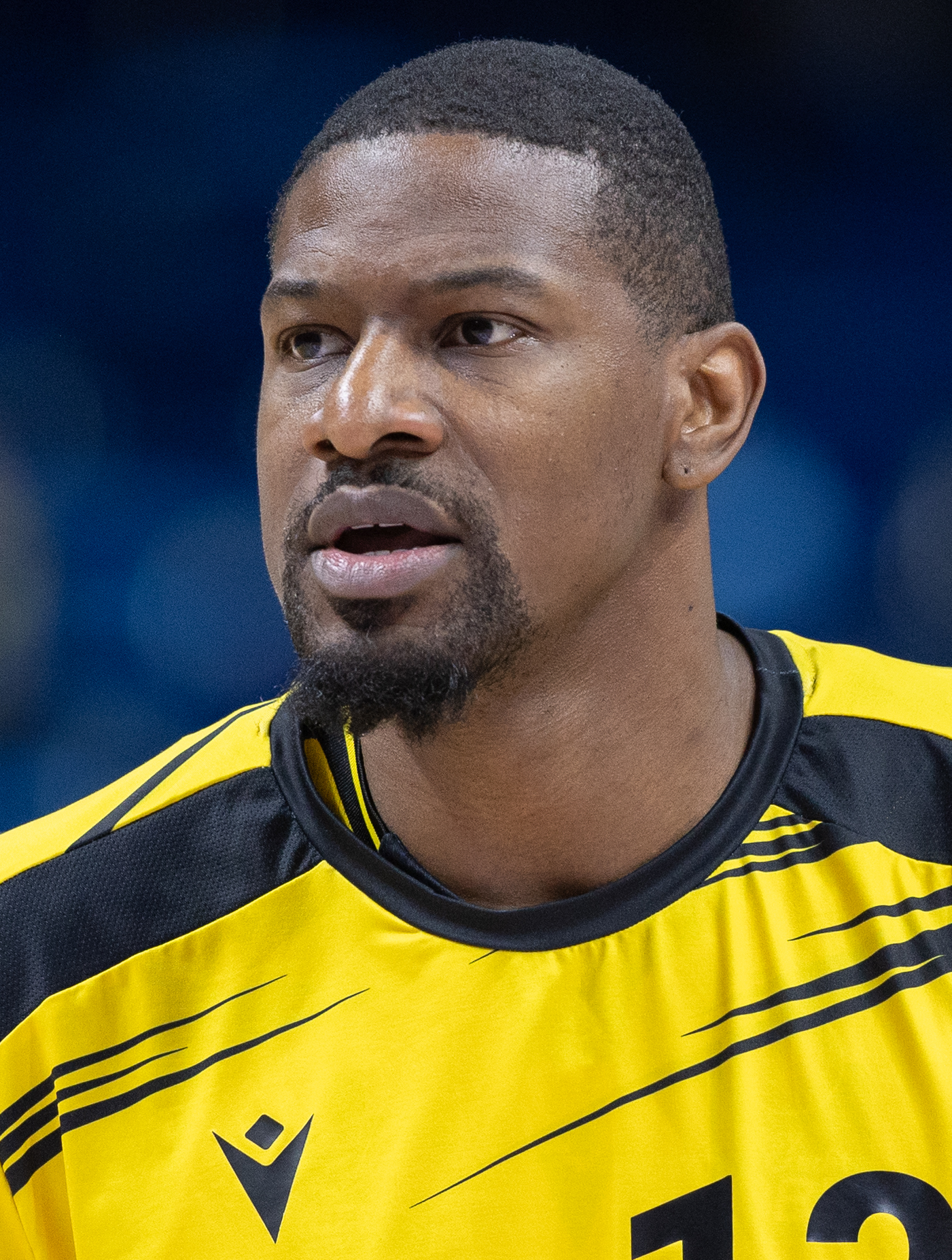
- Polas Bartolo with Riesen Ludwigsburg in 2025

No. 13 – MHP Riesen Ludwigsburg
- Position: Forward
- League: Basketball Bundesliga

Personal information
- Born: August 8, 1985 (age 41) Camagüey, Cuba
- Listed height: 6 ft 4 in (1.93 m)
- Listed weight: 195 lb (88 kg)

Career information
- NBA draft: 2007: undrafted
- Playing career: 2005–present

Career history
- 2005–2012: Tigres de Camagüey
- 2012–2013: München Basket
- 2013–2014: Crailsheim Merlins
- 2014–2016: Gießen 46ers
- 2016–2020: Telekom Baskets Bonn
- 2020: Skyliners Frankfurt
- 2020–present: Riesen Ludwigsburg

Career highlights
- All-FIBA Champions League Defensive Team (2020); 2× German Bundesliga Best Defender (2019, 2021); 2× German BBL All-Star (2018, 2019)

Yorman Polas Bartolo (born 8 August 1985) is a Cuban-German professional basketball player for Riesen Ludwigsburg of the Basketball Bundesliga.

He gained German citizenship in 2015, while he was playing for the Gießen 46ers in Germany.

In April 2018, Polas Bartolo was named the Best Defender of the 2017–18 BBL season. In the 2018–19 season, he won the award again. He signed with Riesen Ludwigsburg on 4 August 2020. On March 18, 2021, it was announced that Bartolo won the award for the third time.

== National team career ==
He played for the Cuban national basketball team at the 2011 FIBA Americas Championship in Mar del Plata, Argentina where he averaged 9 points and 4.5 rebounds per game.
