= Volkswagen Halle =

Sporting arena in Braunschweig, Germany

Coordinates: 52°15′27″N 10°31′09″E

Volkswagen Halle Braunschweig

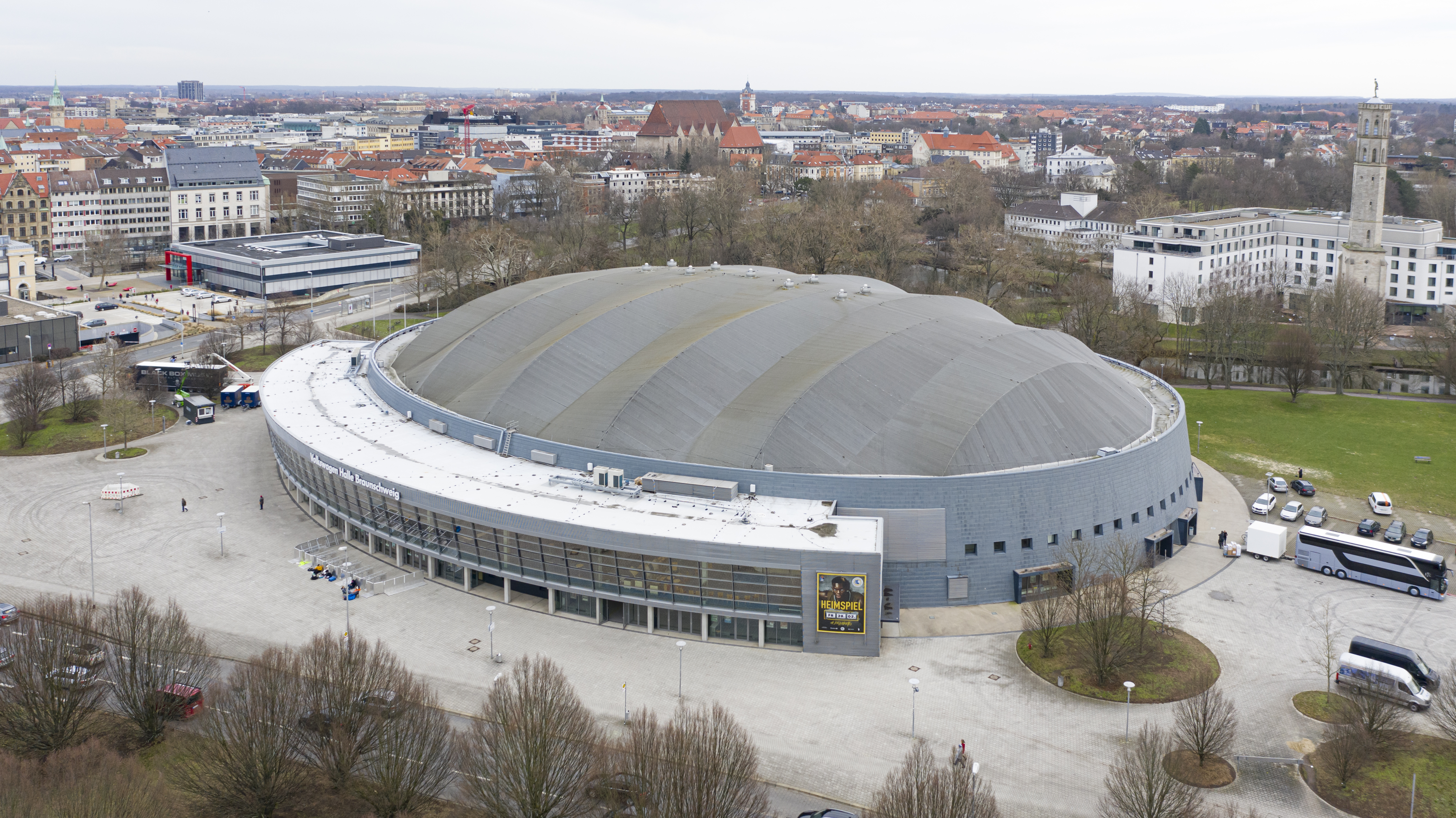
- Interactive map of Volkswagen Halle Braunschweig
- Location: Europaplatz 1; 38100 Braunschweig, Niedersachsen, Germany
- Owner: Stadthalle Braunschweig Betriebsgesellschaft mbH
- Capacity: 6,600 (Basketball); 7,000 (Arena events); 8,000 (Concerts)

Construction
- Built: September 20, 1999
- Opened: September 20, 2000
- Architects: KSP Engel und Zimmermann, Braunschweig

Tenant
- Basketball Löwen Braunschweig (2000–present)

Volkswagen Halle is an indoor sporting arena located in Braunschweig, Germany. The capacity of the arena is 8,000 people. It is currently home to the Basketball Löwen Braunschweig basketball team.

== Sports ==
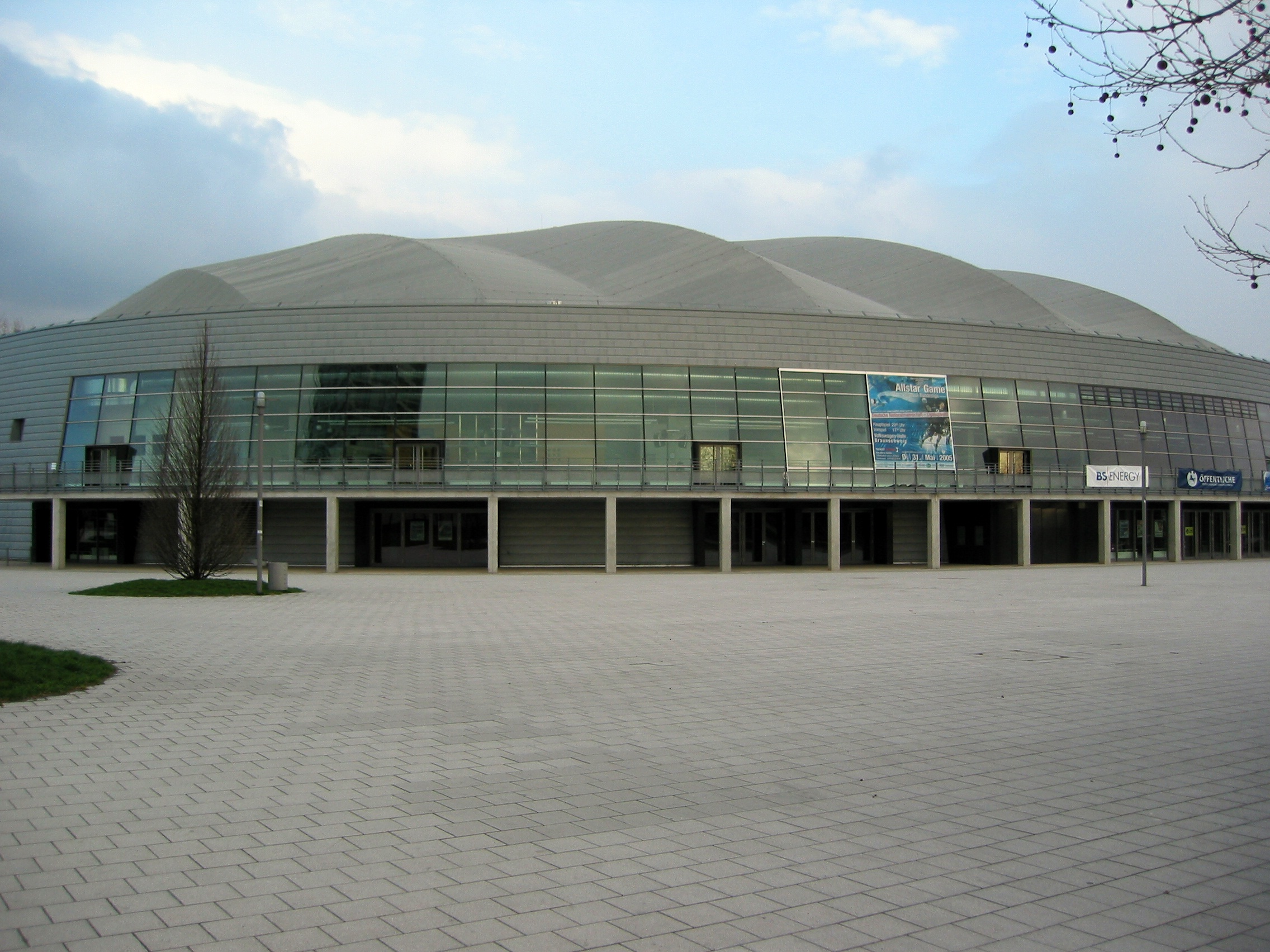
Volkswagen Halle in 2005.

Aside from serving as the home venue of the Basketball Löwen (formerly New Yorker Phantoms) Basketball Bundesliga team, several other sporting events have been hosted in the arena. Those include four editions (2001–2003 and 2005) of the BEKO Supercup, an annual international basketball exhibition tournament organized by the German Basketball Federation, the annual international equestrian tournament Löwen Classics, three editions (2003–2005) of the Handball-Bundesliga All-Star Game as well as the annual pre-season-tournament Handball-Bundesliga-Cup, tennis Davis Cup matches (2001 and 2008), indoor soccer tournaments and boxing.

In October 2007, World Wrestling Entertainment hosted an event as part of the WWE Raw Survivor Series Tour at the arena.

== Other uses ==
The arena also serves as a concert venue. Artists that have performed at the Volkswagen Halle include a-ha, Alice Cooper, Deep Purple, Die Ärzte, Die Fantastischen Vier, Dio, Bob Dylan, David Garrett, Nena, Ozzy Osbourne, and Status Quo.

From 2001 to 2009, and again since 2013, the annual finals of the international breakdance competition Battle of the Year have been held at the Volkswagen Halle.
