= 2020–21 Basketball Bundesliga =

German basketball season

Basketball Bundesliga
- Season: 2020–21
- Dates: 6 November 2020 – 13 June 2021
- Games played: 306
- Teams: 18

Regular season
- Top seed: Riesen Ludwigsburg
- Season MVP: (United States) Jaleen Smith
- Relegated: ~~Giessen 46ers~~ Rasta Vechta

Finals
- Champions: Alba Berlin
- Runners-up: Bayern Munich
- Semi-finalists: Riesen Ludwigsburg ratiopharm Ulm
- Finals MVP: (Uruguay) Jayson Granger

Statistical leaders
Points	(Poland) Michał Michalak	20.5
Rebounds	(United States) David Kravish	8.4
Assists	(United States) Trae Bell-Haynes	7.2

Records
- Attendance: 0 (Note: Due to the COVID-19 pandemic in Germany, all games were played behind closed doors.)

Seasons
- ← 2019–20 2021–22 →

The 2020–21 Basketball Bundesliga, known as the easyCredit BBL for sponsorship reasons, was the 54th season of the Basketball Bundesliga (BBL), the top-tier level of professional club basketball in Germany. It ran from 6 November 2020 to 13 June 2021.

Alba Berlin won their second straight and tenth overall title, after defeating Bayern Munich in four games.

== Teams ==
Location of teams in 2020–21 Basketball Bundesliga

=== Team changes ===
Promoted from 2019–20 ProA	Relegated to 2019–20 Basketball Bundesliga
Niners Chemnitz	None as season was curtailed.

Second-placed Eisbären Bremerhaven gave up its right to promotion.

=== Arenas and locations ===
Team	City	Arena	Capacity
Brose Bamberg	Bamberg	Brose Arena	6,150
Medi Bayreuth	Bayreuth	Oberfrankenhalle	4,000
Alba Berlin	Berlin	Mercedes-Benz Arena	14,500
Telekom Baskets Bonn	Bonn	Telekom Dome	6,000
Löwen Braunschweig	Braunschweig	Volkswagen Halle	6,600
Niners Chemnitz	Chemnitz	Arena Chemnitz	5,200
Crailsheim Merlins	Crailsheim	Arena Hohenlohe	3,000
Skyliners Frankfurt	Frankfurt	Fraport Arena	5,002
Giessen 46ers	Giessen	Sporthalle Gießen-Ost	4,003
BG Göttingen	Göttingen	Sparkassen Arena	3,447
Hamburg Towers	Hamburg	Edel-optics.de Arena	3,400
MHP Riesen Ludwigsburg	Ludwigsburg	MHP-Arena	5,300
Syntainics MBC	Weißenfels	Stadthalle Weißenfels	3,000
Bayern Munich	Munich	Audi Dome	6,700
EWE Baskets Oldenburg	Oldenburg	Große EWE Arena	6,069
ratiopharm Ulm	Ulm	Arena Ulm/Neu-Ulm	6,000
Rasta Vechta	Vechta	Rasta Dome	3,140
s.Oliver Würzburg	Würzburg	s.Oliver Arena	3,140

=== Coaching changes ===
Team	Outgoing coach	Manner of departure	Date of vacancy	Position in table	Replaced with	Date of appointment
Brose Bamberg	(Belgium) Roel Moors	Sacked	24 June 2020	Pre-season	(Netherlands) Johan Roijakkers	1 July 2020
BG Göttingen	(Netherlands) Johan Roijakkers	Signed with Brose Bamberg	1 July 2020	Pre-season	(Belgium) Roel Moors	13 July 2020
Rasta Vechta	(Spain) Pedro Calles	Signed with Hamburg Towers	26 June 2020	Pre-season	(Germany) Thomas Päch	6 July 2020
Hamburg Towers	(United States) Mike Taylor	End of contract	9 June 2020	Pre-season	(Spain) Pedro Calles	26 June 2020
Bayern Munich	(Serbia) Oliver Kostić	Mutual consent	15 July 2020	Pre-season	(Italy) Andrea Trinchieri	15 July 2020
Telekom Baskets Bonn	(United States) Will Voigt	End of contract	15 July 2020	Pre-season	(Montenegro) Igor Jovović	15 July 2020

== Regular season ==
=== League table ===
Pos	Team	Pld	W	L	PF	PA	PD	Pts	Qualification or relegation
1	Riesen Ludwigsburg	34	30	4	3027	2621	+406	60	Playoffs
2	Alba Berlin	34	28	6	2938	2585	+353	56	Playoffs
3	Baskets Oldenburg	34	25	9	3149	2848	+301	50	Playoffs
4	Bayern Munich	34	24	10	2940	2721	+219	48 (Note: Munich 182–179 Crailsheim)	Playoffs
5	Crailsheim Merlins	34	24	10	2945	2797	+148	48	Playoffs
6	ratiopharm Ulm	34	23	11	3005	2648	+357	46	Playoffs
7	Hamburg Towers	34	21	13	2891	2723	+168	42	Playoffs
8	Brose Bamberg	34	17	17	2871	2812	+59	34	Playoffs
9	Basketball Löwen Braunschweig	34	16	18	2857	2958	−101	32	
10	Medi Bayreuth	34	15	19	2867	2877	−10	30	
11	Skyliners Frankfurt	34	13	21	2613	2815	−202	26 (Note: Frankfurt 174–152 Göttingen)	
12	BG Göttingen	34	13	21	2874	3065	−191	26	
13	Telekom Baskets Bonn	34	12	22	2798	2882	−84	24 (Note: Bonn 178–155 Chemnitz)	
14	Niners Chemnitz	34	12	22	2691	2979	−288	24	
15	Mitteldeutscher BC	34	9	25	2813	3057	−244	18 (Note: Mitteldeutscher BC 165–141 Würzburg)	
16	s.Oliver Würzburg	34	9	25	2636	2986	−350	18	
17	Giessen 46ers (Note: As only one team was promoted, Giessen were awarded a wild card for the 2021–22 season, despite being relegated.)	34	8	26	2912	3191	−279	16	
18	Rasta Vechta (R)	34	7	27	2718	2980	−262	14	Relegation to ProA

Source: BBL
Rules for classification: 1) points; 2) head-to-head points; 3) head-to-head points difference; 4) head-to-head number of points scored.
(R) Relegated

=== Results ===
Home \ Away	BAM	BAY	BER	BON	BRA	CHE	CRA	FRA	GIE	GOT	HAM	LUD	MBC	MUN	OLD	ULM	VEC	WUR
Brose Bamberg	—	67–73	76–67	80–66	89–84	93–86	70–77	78–62	99–90	84–106	64–76	94–93	95–80	92–93	78–85	88–74	104–76	81–66
Medi Bayreuth	88–97	—	69–71	83–77	64–77	85–72	97–78	81–58	99–110	80–82	90–83	70–89	99–81	78–98	82–91	93–99	95–79	87–93
Alba Berlin	82–70	80–68	—	97–74	82–87	83–65	100–62	79–66	92–82	89–58	68–75	79–78	93–82	85–72	81–89	93–83	86–70	99–85
Telekom Baskets Bonn	82–86	76–91	75–80	—	78–85	86–62	84–93	85–73	81–68	102–87	63–93	82–86	83–66	71–89	92–97	81–94	94–89	77–89
Basketball Löwen Braunschweig	85–75	90–79	76–82	93–94	—	93–77	75–108	80–68	93–85	91–102	63–74	71–107	91–104	79–94	83–111	94–92	96–78	90–80
Niners Chemnitz	85–82	61–83	81–91	93–92	87–83	—	73–85	70–83	71–95	99–103	98–97	91–114	96–79	85–83	92–98	70–85	89–77	67–76
Crailsheim Merlins	101–95	82–77	77–101	91–88	75–69	88–76	—	76–64	102–77	89–77	85–79	68–58	77–82	74–79	94–80	86–84	98–81	84–94
Skyliners Frankfurt	76–86	104–86	60–94	84–79	103–98	76–89	92–84	—	82–79	81–63	96–89	80–94	76–81	52–75	59–82	68–87	84–75	72–80
Giessen 46ers	99–106	97–92	96–102	75–92	91–103	83–95	82–101	75–74	—	90–92	78–95	80–89	93–105	95–94	82–97	81–106	100–82	73–74
BG Göttingen	87–80	95–99	75–86	102–99	79–76	68–55	81–109	89–93	79–98	—	94–96	81–90	85–93	90–102	73–89	74–98	90–102	96–73
Hamburg Towers	78–75	92–95	90–75	71–78	84–81	75–95	89–72	98–70	100–79	93–91	—	67–73	105–78	91–86	80–74	69–73	92–74	95–83
Riesen Ludwigsburg	83–75	97–92	78–71	89–73	81–74	96–60	97–88	106–69	99–85	100–73	86–65	—	93–74	91–77	98–87	89–87	85–73	87–72
Mitteldeutscher BC	89–100	70–99	82–96	97–103	91–93	84–86	66–84	89–94	102–81	85–99	80–85	80–93	—	84–96	72–87	92–104	82–72	85–73
Bayern Munich	84–70	83–62	62–100	78–69	83–85	77–76	103–105	84–58	93–71	90–72	85–71	93–70	85–66	—	108–102	64–98	90–78	97–76
Baskets Oldenburg	100–99	80–73	86–89	106–87	101–89	119–73	73–90	86–69	93–97	98–77	89–88	75–89	87–79	100–95	—	75–93	101–71	124–84
ratiopharm Ulm	67–74	104–76	76–84	73–72	91–57	102–63	93–78	80–76	107–79	93–64	89–76	77–83	102–73	77–81	86–89	—	74–73	88–64
Rasta Vechta	90–82	89–92	81–82	69–80	71–80	82–69	81–98	72–96	97–84	79–103	82–88	66–84	84–80	78–93	80–82	92–77	—	80–88
s.Oliver Würzburg	82–78	75–90	79–99	73–83	89–93	83–84	80–86	66–95	101–82	82–87	61–90	72–82	68–80	70–74	66–116	77–90	62–95	—

Source: BBL
Legend: Blue = home team win; Red = away team win.

== Playoffs ==
All three rounds of the playoffs are played in a best-of-five format, with the higher seeded team playing the first, third and fifth game at home.

Quarterfinals
1	Riesen Ludwigsburg	3
8	Brose Bamberg	2
4	Bayern Munich	3
5	Crailsheim Merlins	1
2	Alba Berlin	3
7	Hamburg Towers	0
3	Baskets Oldenburg	1
6	ratiopharm Ulm	3

Semifinals
1	Riesen Ludwigsburg	1
4	Bayern Munich	3
2	Alba Berlin	3
6	ratiopharm Ulm	1

Finals
4	Bayern Munich	1
2	Alba Berlin	3

== Awards and statistics ==
=== Major award winners ===
The awards were announced on 19 May 2021.

Award	Player	Club
Most Valuable Player	(United States) Jaleen Smith	Riesen Ludwigsburg
Finals MVP	(Uruguay) Jayson Granger	Alba Berlin
Top Scorer	(Poland) Michał Michalak	Mitteldeutscher BC
Best Offensive Player	(United States) Trae Bell-Haynes	Crailsheim Merlins
Best Defender	(Cuba) Yorman Polas Bartolo	Riesen Ludwigsburg
Most Effective Player International	(United States) David Kravish	Brose Bamberg
Most Effective Player National	(Germany) / (United States) John Bryant	Giessen 46ers
Best German Young Player	(Germany) Justus Hollatz	Hamburg Towers
Coach of the Year	(United States) John Patrick	Riesen Ludwigsburg

=== Statistical leaders ===
Category	Player	Club	Average
Points	(Poland) Michał Michalak	Mitteldeutscher BC	20.5
Rebounds	(United States) David Kravish	Brose Bamberg	8.4
Assists	(Canada) Trae Bell-Haynes	Crailsheim Merlins	7.2
Steals	(United States) Alex Hamilton	Telekom Baskets Bonn	1.9
Blocks	(Germany) Philipp Hartwich	Mitteldeutscher BC	1.7
Efficiency	(United States) David Kravish	Brose Bamberg	21.1

== See also ==
- 2020 BBL-Pokal
