= All-Basketball Bundesliga Team =

German basketball award

The All-Basketball Bundesliga Team, or All-BBL Team, is an annual Basketball Bundesliga (BBL) honor that is bestowed upon the 10 best players in the league, following every Bundesliga season.

== All-BBL Teams ==
Player (X)	Denotes the number of times the player has been selected
‡	Indicates the player who won the Most Valuable Player in the same year

Note: Flags indicate national team eligibility at FIBA-sanctioned events. Players may hold other non-FIBA nationalities not displayed.

Season	First Team		Second Team	
Season	Players	Teams	Players	Teams
2004–05	(Germany) Pascal Roller	Skyliners Frankfurt	(Germany) Steffen Hamann	Brose Bamberg
2004–05	(Croatia) Marko Bulić	Artland Dragons	(United States) Tyron McCoy	EWE Baskets Oldenburg
2004–05	(United States) Chuck Eidson	Gießen 46ers	(France) Narcisse Ewodo	BG Karlsruhe
2004–05	(United States) Chris Williams‡	Skyliners Frankfurt	(Nigeria) Koko Archibong	Brose Bamberg
2004–05	(Federal Republic of Yugoslavia) Jovo Stanojević	Alba Berlin	(United States) Chris Ensminger	Brose Bamberg
2005–06	(Germany) Pascal Roller (2×)	Skyliners Frankfurt	(United States) Justin Love	MHP Riesen Ludwigsburg
2005–06	(United States) Mike Penberthy	Alba Berlin	(United States) Brian Brown	Trier
2005–06	(United States) Chuck Eidson (2×)	Gießen 46ers	(Nigeria) Koko Archibong (2×)	Brose Bamberg
2005–06	(Federal Republic of Yugoslavia) Aleksandar Nađfeji	Köln 99ers	(United States) Nate Fox	Bayer Giants Leverkusen
2005–06	(Federal Republic of Yugoslavia) Jovo Stanojević‡ (2×)	Alba Berlin	(Bosnia and Herzegovina) Ermin Jazvin	MHP Riesen Ludwigsburg
2006–07	(United States) Jerry Green‡	MHP Riesen Ludwigsburg	(United States) Demond Mallet	RheinStars Köln
2006–07	(United States) Julius Jenkins	Alba Berlin	(United States) Immanuel McElroy	RheinStars Köln
2006–07	(United States) Casey Jacobsen	Brose Bamberg	(Germany) Adam Hess	Artland Dragons
2006–07	(United States) Jeff Gibbs	ratiopharm Ulm	(United States) Chris Owens	Alba Berlin
2006–07	(United States) Sharrod Ford	Alba Berlin	(United States) Darren Fenn	Brose Bamberg
2007–08	(United States) Jason Gardner	EWE Baskets Oldenburg	(United States) Bobby Brown	Alba Berlin
2007–08	(United States) Julius Jenkins‡ (2×)	Alba Berlin	(United States) Immanuel McElroy (2×)	Köln 99ers
2007–08	(United States) Rickey Paulding	EWE Baskets Oldenburg	(Germany) Philipp Schwethelm	Köln 99ers
2007–08	(United States) Jeff Gibbs (2×)	ratiopharm Ulm	(United States) Caleb Green	Trier
2007–08	(United States) Chris Ensminger (2×)	Brose Bamberg	(United States) Mike Benton	Trier
2008–09	(United States) Jason Gardner‡ (2×)	EWE Baskets Oldenburg	(United States) Kyle Bailey	BG Göttingen
2008–09	(United States) Julius Jenkins (3×)	Alba Berlin	(United States) Roderick Trice	BG Göttingen
2008–09	(United States) Rickey Paulding (2×)	EWE Baskets Oldenburg	(United States) Immanuel McElroy (3×)	Alba Berlin
2008–09	(United States) Jeff Gibbs (3×)	ratiopharm Ulm	(Serbia) Predrag Šuput	Brose Bamberg
2008–09	(United States) Chris Ensminger (3×)	Paderborn Baskets	(Serbia) Raško Katić	Tigers Tübingen
2009–10	(United States) Louis Campbell	Eisbären Bremerhaven	(Montenegro) Taylor Rochestie	BG Göttingen
2009–10	(United States) Julius Jenkins‡ (4×)	Alba Berlin	(United States) Je'Kel Foster	EWE Baskets Oldenburg
2009–10	(Germany) Robin Benzing	ratiopharm Ulm	(United States) Immanuel McElroy (4×)	Alba Berlin
2009–10	(Serbia) Predrag Šuput (2×)	Brose Bamberg	(United States) Jeff Gibbs (4×)	Eisbären Bremerhaven
2009–10	(United States) Chris Ensminger (4×)	Telekom Baskets Bonn	(Montenegro) Blagota Sekulić	Alba Berlin
2010–11	(United States) DaShaun Wood‡	Skyliners Frankfurt	(Montenegro) Tyrese Rice	Artland Dragons
2010–11	(United States) Julius Jenkins (5×)	Alba Berlin	(United States) Brian Roberts	Brose Bamberg
2010–11	(United States) Casey Jacobsen (2×)	Brose Bamberg	(Germany) Robin Benzing (2×)	ratiopharm Ulm
2010–11	(Serbia) Predrag Šuput (3×)	Brose Bamberg	(United States) Derrick Allen	Alba Berlin
2010–11	(United States) John Bryant	ratiopharm Ulm	(Germany) Tibor Pleiß	Brose Bamberg
2011–12	(United States) DaShaun Wood (2×)	ALBA Berlin	(United States) Jared Jordan	Telekom Baskets Bonn
2011–12	(United States) Isaiah Swann	ratiopharm ulm	(Germany) Anton Gavel	Brose Baskets
2011–12	(United States) Casey Jacobsen (3×)	Brose Baskets	(United States) Bryce Taylor	ALBA Berlin
2011–12	(United States) P. J. Tucker	Brose Baskets	(United States) Chevon Troutman	Bayern Munich
2011–12	(United States) John Bryant‡ (2×)	ratiopharm ulm	(Germany) Tibor Pleiß (2×)	Brose Baskets
2012–13	(United States) Jared Jordan (2×)	Telekom Baskets Bonn	(Montenegro) Tyrese Rice (2×)	Bayern Munich
2012–13	(Germany) Anton Gavel (2×)	Brose Baskets	(United States) Davin White	Phoenix Hagen
2012–13	(United States) Rickey Paulding (3×)	EWE Baskets Oldenburg	(United States) Reggie Redding	Walter Tigers Tübingen
2012–13	(United States) Deon Thompson	ALBA Berlin	(United States) Chevon Troutman (2×)	Bayern Munich
2012–13	(United States) John Bryant (3×) ‡	ratiopharm ulm	(United States) Adam Chubb	EWE Baskets Oldenburg
2013–14	(United States) Malcolm Delaney^{‡}	Bayern Munich	(United States) Jared Jordan (3×)	Brose Baskets
2013–14	(Germany) Anton Gavel (3×)	Brose Baskets	(United States) Julius Jenkins (6×)	EWE Baskets Oldenburg
2013–14	(United States) Reggie Redding (2×)	ALBA Berlin	(United States) Bryce Taylor (2×)	Bayern Munich
2013–14	(Italy) Angelo Caloiaro	Mitteldeutscher	(United States) Deon Thompson (2×)	Bayern Munich
2013–14	(Israel) D'or Fischer	Brose Baskets	(Croatia) Leon Radošević	ALBA Berlin
2014–15	(United States) Brad Wanamaker	Brose Baskets	(United States) Khalid El-Amin	BG Göttingen
2014–15	(United States) Alex Renfroe	ALBA Berlin	(Bosnia and Herzegovina) Nihad Đjedović	Bayern Munich
2014–15	(United States) D. J. Kennedy	MHP Riesen Ludwigsburg	(United States) Ryan Thompson	Brose Baskets
2014–15	(United States) Jamel McLean^{‡}	ALBA Berlin	(United States) Raymar Morgan	BG Göttingen
2014–15	(United States) John Bryant (4×)	Bayern Munich	(Germany) Tim Ohlbrecht	ratiopharm Ulm
2015–16	(United States) Brad Wanamaker^{‡} (2×)	Brose Baskets	(North Macedonia) Jordan Theodore	Fraport Skyliners
2015–16	(United States) Bryce Taylor (3×)	Bayern Munich	(United States) Vaughn Duggins	EWE Baskets Oldenburg
2015–16	(United States) Rickey Paulding (4×)	EWE Baskets Oldenburg	(United States) Darius Miller	Brose Baskets
2015–16	(Italy) Nicolò Melli	Brose Baskets	(Germany) Daniel Theis	Brose Baskets
2015–16	(United States) Brian Qvale	EWE Baskets Oldenburg	(Germany) Johannes Voigtmann	Fraport Skyliners
2016–17	(United States) Chris Kramer	EWE Baskets Oldenburg	(United States) Josh Mayo	Telekom Baskets Bonn
2016–17	(United States) Chris Babb	ratiopharm Ulm	(United States) Trey Lewis	medi bayreuth
2016–17	(United States) Darius Miller (2×)	Brose Bamberg	(United States) Rickey Paulding (5×)	EWE Baskets Oldenburg
2016–17	(Italy) Nicolò Melli (2×)	Brose Bamberg	(Germany) Maxi Kleber	Bayern Munich
2016–17	(United States) Raymar Morgan^{‡} (2×)	ratiopharm Ulm	(United States) Brian Qvale (2×)	EWE Baskets Oldenburg
2017–18	(United States) Peyton Siva	Alba Berlin	(United States) Josh Mayo (2×)	Telekom Baskets Bonn
2017–18	(United States) Thomas Walkup	MHP Riesen Ludwigsburg	(Canada) Philip Scrubb	Skyliners Frankfurt
2017–18	(Germany) Robin Benzing	s.Oliver Würzburg	(United States) Rickey Paulding (6×)	EWE Baskets Oldenburg
2017–18	(United States) Luke Sikma^{‡}	Alba Berlin	(Germany) Danilo Barthel	Bayern Munich
2017–18	(United States) John Bryant (5×)	Gießen 46ers	(United States) Devin Booker	Bayern Munich
2018–19	(United States) Will Cummings^{‡}	EWE Baskets Oldenburg	(United States) Peyton Siva (2×)	Alba Berlin
2018–19	(United States) Will Cummings^{‡}	EWE Baskets Oldenburg	(Montenegro) Tyrese Rice (3×)	Brose Bamberg
2018–19	(United States) T. J. Bray	Rasta Vechta	(United States) DeAndre Lansdowne	Löwen Braunschweig
2018–19	(Lithuania) Rokas Giedraitis	Alba Berlin	(Serbia) Vladimir Lučić	Bayern Munich
2018–19	(United States) Luke Sikma (2×)	Alba Berlin	(Germany) Danilo Barthel (2×)	Bayern Munich
2018–19	(Austria) Rašid Mahalbašić	EWE Baskets Oldenburg	(United States) John Bryant (6×)	Gießen 46ers
