= Rickey Paulding =

American professional basketball player (born 1982)

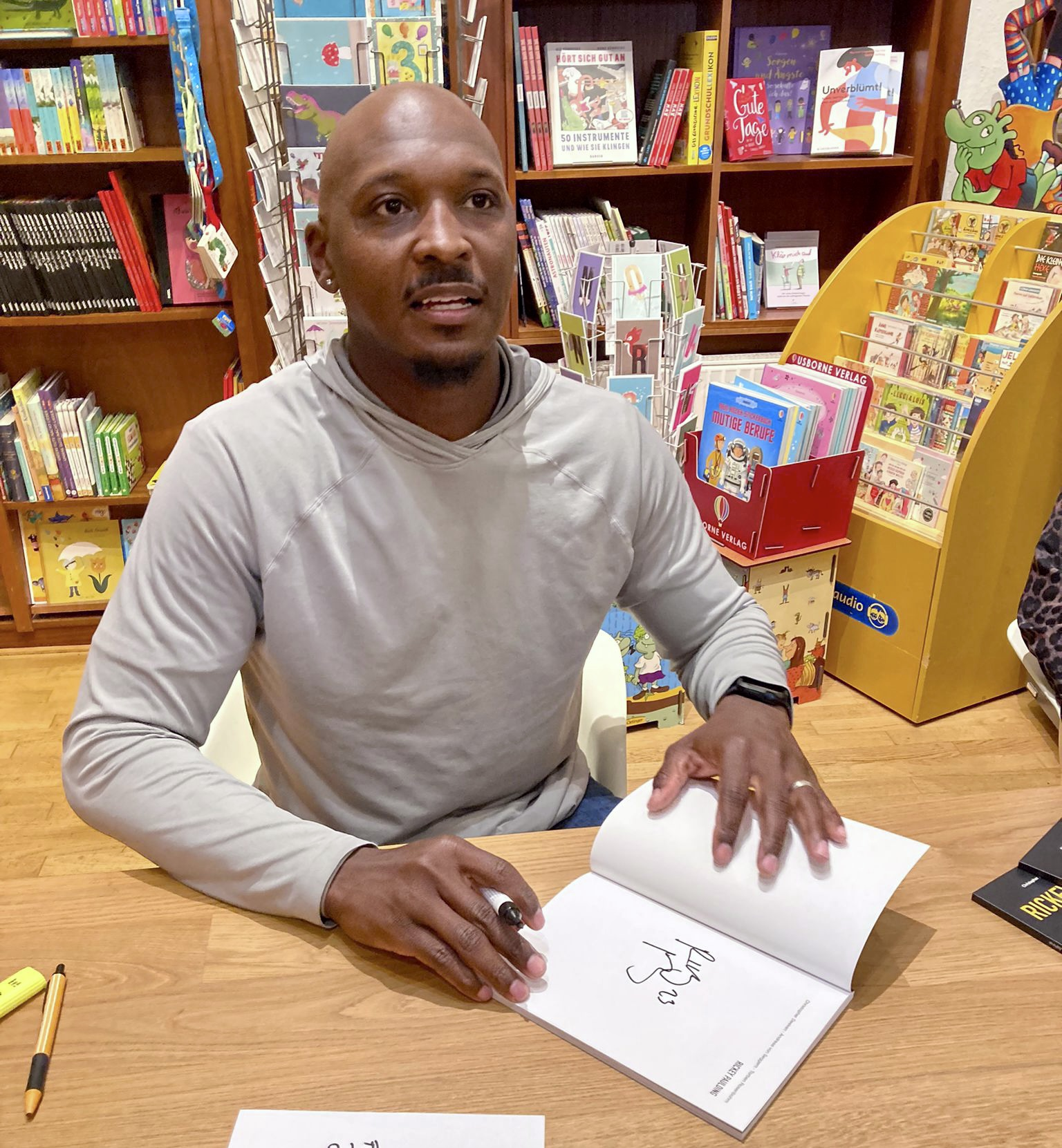

Personal information
- Born: October 23, 1982 (age 44) Detroit, Michigan, U.S.
- Listed height: 6 ft 5 in (1.96 m)
- Listed weight: 218 lb (99 kg)

Career information
- High school: Renaissance (Detroit, Michigan)
- College: Missouri (2000–2004)
- NBA draft: 2004: 2nd round, 54th overall pick
- Drafted by: Detroit Pistons
- Playing career: 2004–2022
- Position: Shooting guard / small forward
- Number: 23

Career history
- 2004–2005: Hapoel Jerusalem
- 2005–2006: ASVEL
- 2006–2007: BCM Gravelines
- 2007–2022: Oldenburg

Career highlights
- 4× All-Bundesliga First Team (2008, 2009, 2013, 2016); 4x All-Bundesliga Second Team (2017, 2018, 2020, 2021); 8× German All-Star (2008, 2009, 2011–2013, 2016–2018); Bundesliga champion (2009); BBL–Pokal Winner (2015); Bundesliga Finals MVP (2009); No. 23 retired by EWE Baskets Oldenburg; 2× Second-team All–Big 12 (2003, 2004)
- Stats at Basketball Reference

Rickey Paulding (born October 23, 1982) is an American former professional basketball player. He played college basketball for the Missouri Tigers.

== Early career ==
Paulding attended Renaissance High School in Detroit. In his senior season, he averaged 25.3 points per game, and 12 rebounds per game, and led his team to a 27–3 record. He was an honorable mention All-USA selection during that season as well.

== College career ==
In his collegiate career, Paulding scored 1,200 points and grabbed 300 rebounds. Paulding scored 37 points and making an astounding nine threes against Dwyane Wade, Travis Diener and the Marquette Golden Eagles in the Tigers' loss in the second round of the NCAA tournament his junior year. He opted to return for his senior season.

== Professional career ==
Paulding was drafted 54th overall in the second round of the 2004 NBA draft by the Detroit Pistons. Paulding averaged 12.2 points per game in the NBA Summer League for the Pistons.

At the end of 2021–22 season, he has decided to retire from professional basketball.

== Career statistics ==
=== Bundesliga ===
Denotes season in which Paulding's team won the Bundesliga championship
Led the league

Regular Season

Year	Team	GP	GS	MPG	FG%	3P%	FT%	RPG	APG	SPG	BPG	PPG	PIR
2007–08	Oldenburg	34	31	32.5	.489	.389	.695	3.5	1.5	1.2	1.9	12.5	11.6
2008–09	Oldenburg	34	34	33.1	.509	.450	.742	4.4	1.8	1.5	0.4	14.8	15.1
2009–10	Oldenburg	33	33	33.3	.435	.351	.731	3.2	2.3	1.0	0.6	13.5	11.8
2010–11	Oldenburg	34	33	35.2	.425	.302	.806	4.1	2.3	1.0	0.4	12.6	11.9
2011–12	Oldenburg	34	34	31.1	.468	.402	.836	3.8	1.8	0.7	0.5	12.4	12.2
2012–13	Oldenburg	34	34	27.0	.484	.423	.795	3.4	1.9	0.9	0.2	12.4	12.3
2013–14	Oldenburg	34	34	27.5	.467	.439	.800	3.9	2.2	0.9	0.3	13.9	13.8
2014–15	Oldenburg	34	34	26.6	.477	.409	.762	3.4	2.7	0.6	0.4	11.2	11.8
2015–16	Oldenburg	33	33	30.2	.500	.408	.744	3.0	3.0	0.8	0.4	13.2	13.2
2016–17	Oldenburg	32	32	31.3	.480	.423	.841	2.8	2.1	0.8	0.2	16.0	13.5
2017–18	Oldenburg	34	34	31.1	.487	.345	.883	3.2	1.8	1.0	0.2	14.7	14.3
2018–19	Oldenburg	34	34	30.5	.487	.397	.893	3.7	1.8	0.9	0.5	13.2	14.1
2019–20	Oldenburg	20	20	30.0	.459	.333	.896	2.6	1.4	0.7	0.2	15.8	12.4
2020–21	Oldenburg	34	34	25.8	.499	.383	.825	2.4	1.2	0.9	0.2	15.5	13.1
2021–22	Oldenburg	34	19	26.3	.584	.374	.860	2.6	1.6	1.1	0.2	11.9	11.4
Career		492	473	30.3	.480	.390	.805	3.4	2.0	0.9	0.3	13.5	12.8

Playoffs

Year	Team	GP	GS	MPG	FG%	3P%	FT%	RPG	APG	SPG	BPG	PPG	PIR
2007–08	Oldenburg	8	8	36.9	.506	.345	.579	4.4	1.3	0.8	0.0	13.4	12.3
2008–09	Oldenburg	12	12	36.5	.493	.493	.732	4.3	1.2	1.3	0.1	17.9	15.3
2009–10	Oldenburg	4	4	35.5	.688	.191	.739	1.8	1.5	1.3	0.0	12.8	8.8
2010–11	Oldenburg	5	5	35.6	.435	.333	.783	3.0	2.8	1.2	0.8	13.2	12.8
2012–13	Oldenburg	11	11	35.6	.465	.420	.941	2.9	0.7	0.6	0.4	11.7	10.2
2013–14	Oldenburg	10	10	32.7	.390	.229	.647	4.3	1.3	1.0	0.3	10.8	9.0
2014–15	Oldenburg	3	3	33.3	.400	.364	.933	2.7	2.3	0.7	0.0	12.7	10.7
2015–16	Oldenburg	4	4	33.8	.574	.483	.824	2.3	1.5	0.8	0.3	22.5	18.8
2016–17	Oldenburg	12	12	32.2	.497	.444	.816	2.3	3.3	0.9	0.1	16.6	15.6
2017–18	Oldenburg	5	5	34.7	.500	.421	.700	4.4	1.2	1.4	0.0	17.2	15.2
2018–19	Oldenburg	6	6	33.8	.450	.310	.778	4.7	1.8	1.3	0.2	12.8	13.7
2019–20	Oldenburg	8	8	26.7	.361	.273	.783	2.1	1.9	0.1	0.4	10.9	7.1
2020–21	Oldenburg	4	4	29.0	.418	.261	.813	2.5	2.0	0.8	0.3	16.3	12.8

BBL-Pokal

Year	Team	GP	GS	MPG	FG%	3P%	FT%	RPG	APG	SPG	BPG	PPG	PIR
2015	Oldenburg	2	2	29.3	.471	.406	.807	3.4	2.7	0.6	0.4	7.0	11.7
2016	Oldenburg	1	1	30.0	.500	.000	1.000	4.0	2.9	0.8	0.4	14.2	13.8
2019	Oldenburg	1	1	32.7	.636	.667	.000	5.0	1.0	1.0	0.4	18.0	14.0
2020	Oldenburg	4	4	30.8	.429	.571	.867	3.5	2.3	0.3	0.0	13.5	12.0
2021	Oldenburg	2	2	24.6	.417	.364	.000	2.5	2.0	0.0	1.0	12.0	8.5
2022	Oldenburg	1	1	32.2	.380	.500	1.000	3.0	1.0	0.0	1.0	10.0	10.0

== Awards and honors ==
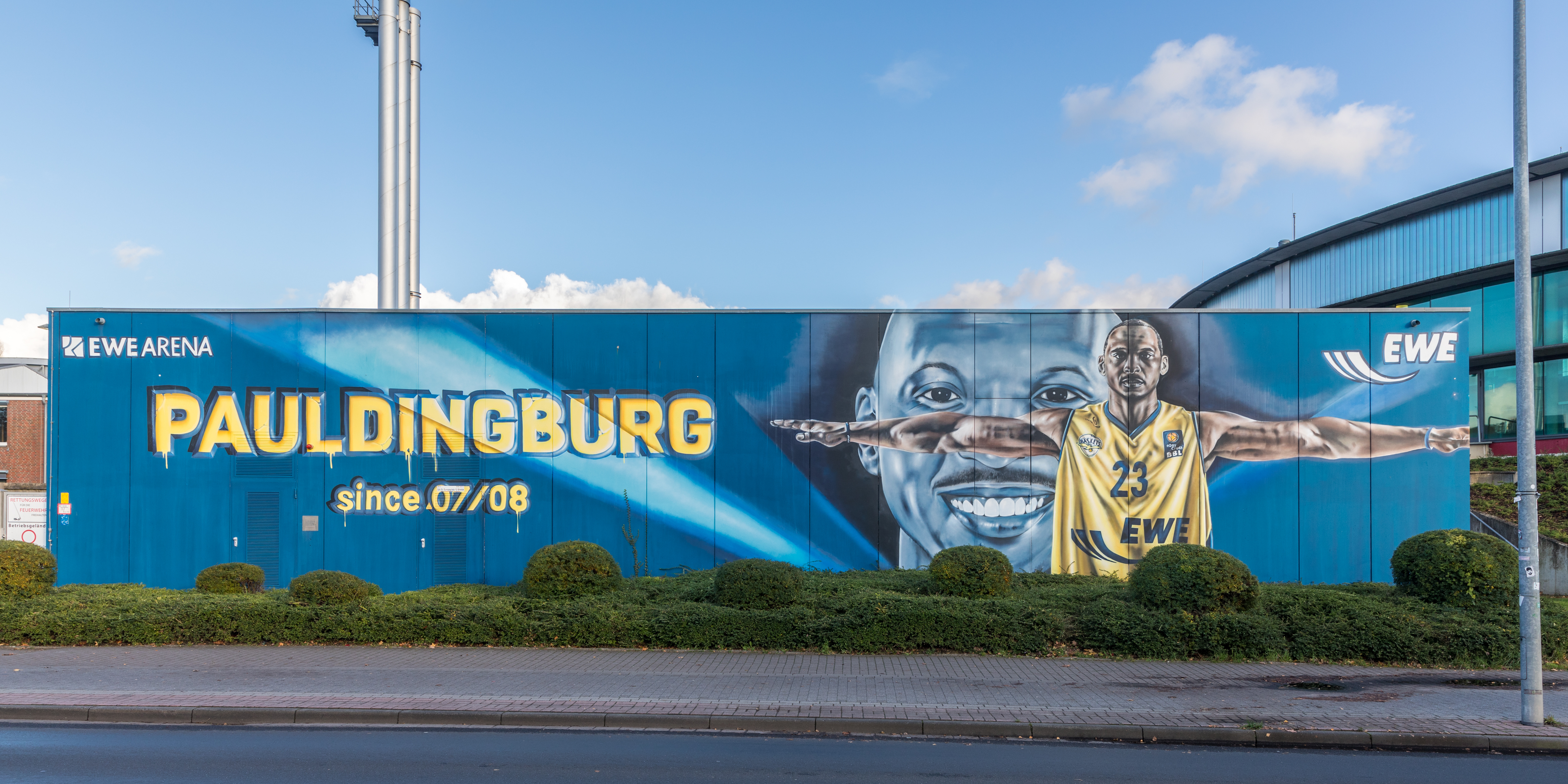
"Pauldingburg", honored in Oldenburg at the EWE Arena

- 2003 Wooden Award pre-season finalist
- 2003 Second Team All Big 12
- Scored 36 points in the NCAA Tournament against Marquette.
- Made 9 three-point field goals against Marquette
- 7th Highest all time scorer at Mizzou.
- Most points ever scored on former NBA player Dwyane Wade in a single NCAA game.
- Starter for the Northern All-Star Team in the Basketball Bundesliga All-Star Games 2009–2011.
- 2009 BBL Finals MVP after leading EWE Baskets Oldenburg to the league title.
- Most Likeable Player/Pascal Roller Award of the 2008/2009, 2016/2017, 2017/2018 and 2021/2022 Basketball Bundesliga Seasons
