= Milenko Bogićević =

Serbian basketball coach

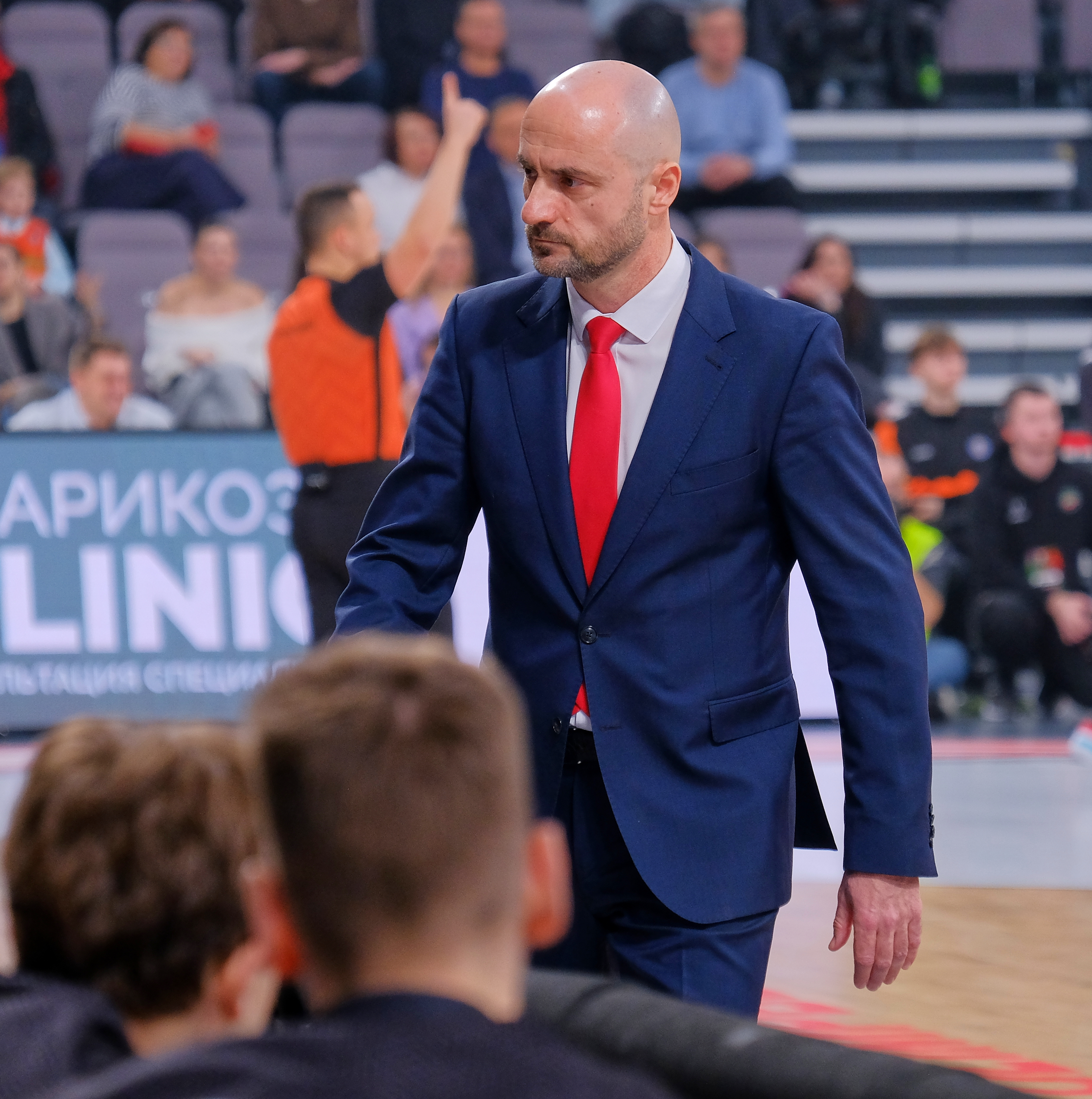
- With the BC Avtodor (2024)

EWE Baskets Oldenburg
- Position: Head coach
- League: Basketball Bundesliga

Personal information
- Born: 9 December 1976 (age 49) Krupanj, SR Serbia, SFR Yugoslavia
- Coaching career: 1995–present

Career history

Coaching
- 2004–2007: Beovuk 72
- 2007–2008: Polpak Świecie (assistant)
- 2008–2009: Mega Hypo Leasing (assistant)
- 2009: Turów Zgorzelec (assistant)
- 2010–2012: Donetsk (assistant)
- 2012–2016: Alba Berlin (assistant)
- 2016–2018: Lokomotiv Kuban (assistant)
- 2019–2020: AS Monaco (assistant)
- 2020: Crvena zvezda (assistant)
- 2021–2022: Prometey (assistant)
- 2021: Prometey (interim)
- 2022–2023: AS Monaco (assistant)
- 2023–2024: Avtodor Saratov
- 2026: Mitteldeutscher BC
- 2026–present: EWE Baskets Oldenburg

Milenko "Mikica" Bogićević (Serbian Cyrillic: Миленко "Микица" Богићевић; born 9 December 1976) is a Serbian professional basketball coach for the EWE Baskets Oldenburg in the Basketball Bundesliga (BBL).

== Coaching career ==
Bogićević started his coaching career in 1995 joining a youth system coaching staff of the Belgrade based team Beovuk 72. In 2004, he became the head coach of their senior team. He left Beovuk 72 after the 2006–07 season. Prior to the 2007–08 season, coach Mihailo Uvalin added Bogićević to his coaching staff at the Polish team Polpak Świecie. During the 2008–09 season, Bogićević assisted Uvalin in Mega Hypo Leasing.

From 2010 to 2012, Bogićević was an assistant coach for Donetsk of the Ukrainian SuperLeague as a member of the coaching staff of Saša Obradović. In July 2012, Bogićević became an assistant coach for Alba Berlin of the German Basketball Bundesliga joining the Obradović coaching staff.

In 2016, Bogićević was named as an assistant coach for Lokomotiv Kuban of the Russian VTB United League, joining the Obradović's staff. On 20 December 2017, Bogićević led the Lokomotiv team to a 91–69 road win over RETAbet Bilbao Basket. The Lokomotiv head coach had fallen ill and missed their EuroCup game against Bilbao. Bogićević parted ways with Lokomotiv Kuban in summer 2018. During the 2019–20 season, Bogićević was an assistant coach for AS Monaco.

On 10 June 2020, coach Obradović added Bogićević to the Crvena zvezda coaching staff as his first assistant. Bogićević left the Zvezda following the departure of coach Obradović in December 2020.

On 15 April 2021, Ukrainian club Prometey under Ronen Ginzburg added Bogićević as their new first assistant coach. He was an interim head coach during the 2021 Ukrainian SuperLeague Finals. In July 2022, Bogićević was named as an assistant coach for AS Monaco.

== Career achievements ==
As assistant coach

- Ukrainian SuperLeague champion: 2 (with Donetsk: 2011–12; with Prometey: 2020–21)
- German Cup winner: 3 (with Alba Berlin: 2013, 2014, 2016)
- Russian Cup winner: 1 (with Lokomotiv Kuban: 2018)
