= Daniel Strauch =

German basketball player (born 1981)

Personal information
- Born: January 8, 1981 (age 45) Osnabrück, Germany
- Listed height: 206 cm (6 ft 9 in)
- Listed weight: 110 kg (243 lb)

Career information
- Playing career: 2001–2010
- Position: Power forward
- Number: 6

Career history
- 2001–2003: Artland Dragons
- 2003–2010: EWE Baskets Oldenburg

Career highlights
- German League champion (2009); German Supercup winner (2009); No. 6 retired by EWE Baskets Oldenburg

Daniel Strauch (born January 8, 1981) is a former German professional basketball player. Strauch mainly played as power forward.

== Professional career ==
Strauch spent the majority of his pro career with EWE Baskets Oldenburg. His jersey number 6 was retired by the club from Oldenburg.
