= 2009 BBL Champions Cup =

Telekom Bonn	EWE Oldenburg
69	54
- Venue: Artland-Arena, Quakenbrück
- Attendance: 2,750

The 2008 BBL Champions Cup was the fourth edition of the super cup game in German basketball.

== Match ==
19 September 2008	EWE Baskets Oldenburg	69–54	Telekom Baskets Bonn	Artland-Arena, Quakenbrück
19:30 GMT+1	Scoring by quarter: 10–15, 18–9, 15–16, 26–13
	Pts: Gardner 16; Rebs: Boumtje Boumtje 9 Asts: Gardner 4 Eff: Gardner 13	Boxscore	Pts: Taylor 19; Rebs: Yarbrough 7 Asts: Jordan 4 Eff: Taylor 17	Attendance: 2,750

Oldenburg	Bonn

2009 Champions Cup Winners
EWE Baskets Oldenburg
(1st title)
