= 2015 BBL-Pokal =

German basketball cup season

BBL-Pokal
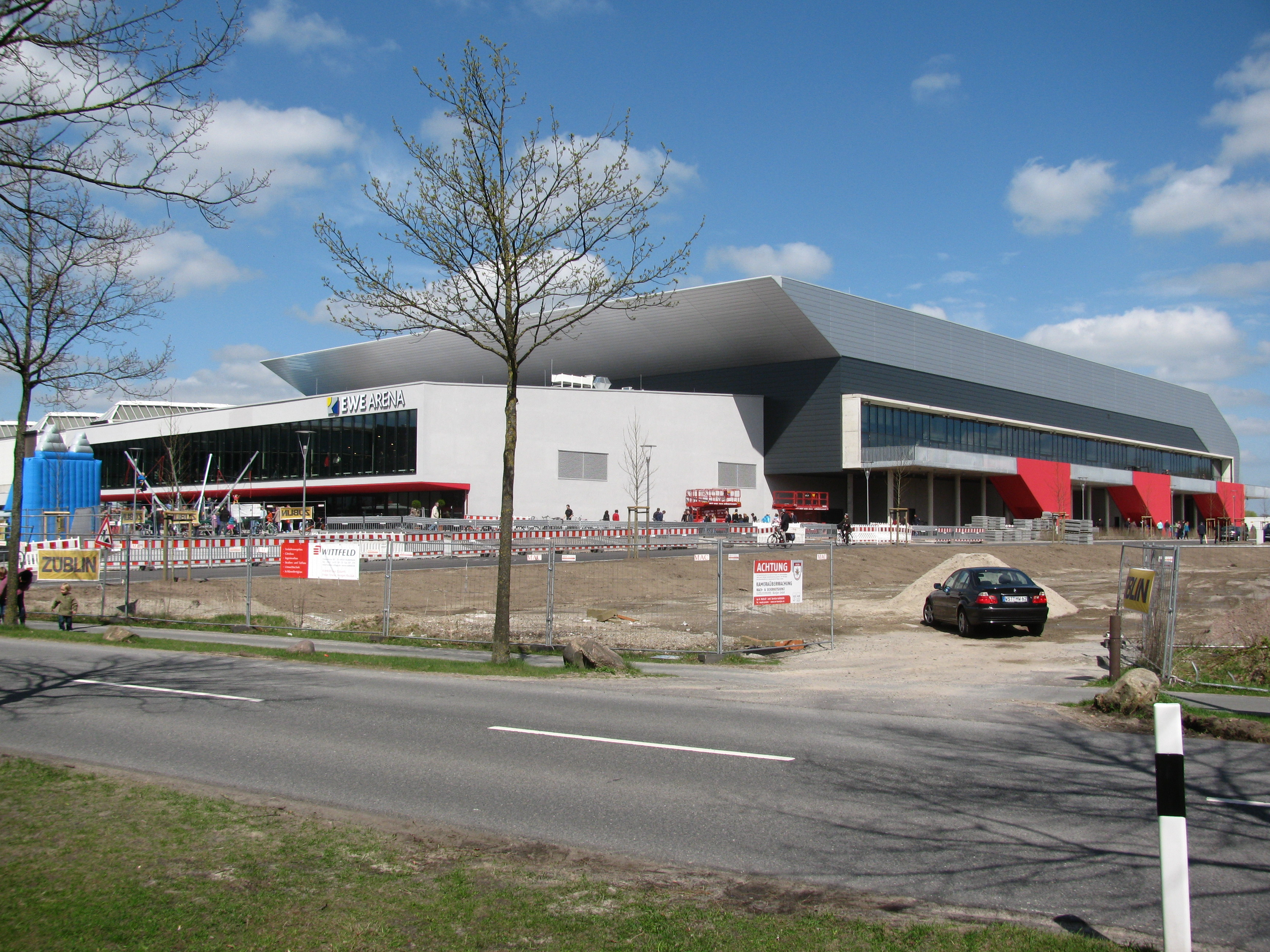
- The EWE Arena is the venue for the Final Four
- Games played: 7
- Teams: 7

Finals
- Champions: EWE Baskets Oldenburg; 1st title
- Runners-up: Brose Baskets
- Third place: Alba Berlin
- Fourth place: Telekom Baskets Bonn

The 2015 BBL-Pokal was the 48th season of the German Basketball Cup. The Final Four was held in Oldenburg, which gained EWE Baskets Oldenburg automatic qualification. The other six participating teams were selected through the standings in the 2014–15 Basketball Bundesliga.

== Participants ==
The following six teams qualified based on their standings in the 2013–14 BBL.

1. Alba Berlin
2. Brose Baskets
3. Bayern Munich
4. Telekom Baskets Bonn
5. ratiopharm ulm
6. BG Göttingen

EWE Baskets Oldenburg was qualified because the Final Four will be played on their home court.

== Bracket ==
Quarterfinals
4	ratiopharm ulm	61
2	Brose Baskets	76
1	Alba Berlin	74
3	Bayern Munich	69
5	Telekom Baskets Bonn	92
6	BG Göttingen	83
EWE Baskets Oldenburg
Bye

Semifinals
2	Brose Baskets	86
1	Alba Berlin	65
5	Telekom Baskets Bonn	71
EWE Baskets Oldenburg	77

Finals
2	Brose Baskets	70
EWE Baskets Oldenburg	72
Third place
1	Alba Berlin	85
5	Telekom Baskets Bonn	69

=== Quarterfinals ===
18 February 2015
20:00

Boxscore

ratiopharm ulm	61–76	Brose Baskets
Scoring by quarter: 13–18, 11–23, 23–18, 14–17
Pts: Brion Rush 16; Rebs: Tim Ohlbrecht 6 Asts: Per Günther 6		Pts: Daniel Theis 17; Rebs: Trevor Mbakwe 10; Asts: Dawan Robinson 4

Arena Ulm/Neu-Ulm, Ulm
Attendance: 6,200
Referees: Moritz Reiter, Clemens Fritz, Konstantin Simonow

18 February 2015
20:00

Boxscore

Alba Berlin	74–69	Bayern Munich
Scoring by quarter: 14–19, 17–19, 17–16, 26–15
Pts: Jamel McLean 19; Rebs: Jamel McLean 8 Asts: Alex Renfroe 6		Pts: Duško Savanović 15; Rebs: John Bryant 11; Asts: Vasilije Micić 4

O^{2} World, Berlin
Attendance: 11,678
Referees: Robert Lottermoser, Oliver Krause, Toni Rodriguez

24 February 2015
20:00

Boxscore

Telekom Baskets Bonn	92–83	BG Göttingen
Scoring by quarter: 29–18, 23–19, 24–23, 16–23
Pts: Benas Veikalas 26; Rebs: Tadas Klimavičius 9 Asts: Caloiaro, Lawrence 5		Pts: Harper Kamp 17; Rebs: Raymar Morgan 5 Asts: Alex Ruoff 4

Telekom Dome, Bonn
Attendance: 3,800
Referees: Boris Schmidt, Martin Matip, Andreas Schreiner

=== Semifinals ===
11 April 2015
17:00

Boxscore

Brose Baskets	86–65	Alba Berlin
Scoring by quarter: 22–16, 22–14, 18–23, 24–12
Pts: Brad Wanamaker 22; Rebs: Trevor Mbakwe 8 Asts: Robinson, Thompson 3		Pts: Banić, Radošević 11; Rebs: Alex Renfroe 5 Asts: Alex Renfroe 4

Large EWE Arena, Oldenburg
Attendance: 6,000
Referees: Martin Matip, Toni Rodriguez, Oliver Krause

11 April 2015
20:00

Boxscore

EWE Baskets Oldenburg	77–71	Telekom Baskets Bonn
Scoring by quarter: 20–18, 15–25, 22–13, 20–15
Pts: Casper Ware 14; Rebs: Philipp Neumann 7 Asts: Ware, Jenkins 4		Pts: Benas Veikalas 17; Rebs: Tadas Klimavičius 8 Asts: Eugene Lawrence 5

Large EWE Arena, Oldenburg
Attendance: 6,000
Referees: Robert Lottermoser, Moritz Reiter, Benjamin Barth

=== Third place game ===
12 April 2015
11:00

Boxscore

Alba Berlin	85–69	Telekom Baskets Bonn
Scoring by quarter: 18–20, 24–17, 22–17, 21–15
Pts: Reggie Redding 15; Rebs: Jonas Wohlfarth-Bottermann 8 Asts: three players 3		Pts: Angelo Caloiaro 11; Rebs: Tadas Klimavičius 4 Asts: McConnell, Klimavičius 3

Large EWE Arena, Oldenburg
Attendance: 6,000
Referees: Martin Matip, Oliver Krause, Toni Rodriguez

=== Final ===
12 April 2015
14:00

Boxscore

Brose Bamberg	70–72	EWE Oldenburg
Scoring by quarter: 17–24, 17–10, 20–17, 16–21
Pts: Brad Wanamaker 19; Rebs: Trevor Mbakwe 10; Asts: Brad Wanamaker 4		Pts: Casper Ware 13; Rebs: Chubb, Aleksandrov 5 Asts: Chris Kramer 7

Large EWE Arena, Oldenburg
Attendance: 6,000
Referees: Robert Lottermoser, Moritz Reiter, Benjamin Barth

Brose	Oldenburg

Starters:			Pts
PG	11	(United States) Bradley Wanamaker	19
SG	9	(Germany) Karsten Tadda	0
SF	7	(United States) Ryan Thompson	3
PF	20	(Germany) Elias Harris	5
C	21	(United States) Trevor Mbakwe	8
Reserves:			
G	13	(Lithuania) Jānis Strēlnieks	16
F	6	(United States) Darius Miller	10
G	55	(United States) Dawan Robinson	6
F	10	(Germany) Daniel Theis	3
C	4	(Croatia) Dalibor Bagarić	–
G	17	(Germany) Andreas Obst	–
G	12	(Germany) Daniel Schmidt	–
Head coach:
(Italian Basketball Federation) Andrea Trinchieri

Game rules
The game was played with FIBA rules.

2015 BBL-Pokal Winners
EWE Oldenburg
1st title

Starters:			Pts
PG	5	(United States) Casper Ware	13
SG	4	(United States) Chris Kramer	8
SF	23	(United States) Rickey Paulding	8
PF	32	(Serbia) Nemanja Aleksandrov	3
C	34	(Germany) Philipp Neumann	12
Reserves:			
G	9	(United States) Maurice Stuckey	9
F	7	(Germany) Philip Zwiener	9
G	11	(United States) Adam Chubb	8
C	12	(Netherlands) Robin Smeulders	2
G	22	(United States) Julius Jenkins	0
F	30	(Germany) Jan-Niklas Wimberg	–
G	21	(Germany) Dominic Lockhart	–
Head coach:
(German Basketball Federation) Mladen Drijencic
