= Eurocup 2014–15 Regular Season Group C =

Standings and results for Group C of the Regular Season phase of the 2014–15 Eurocup basketball tournament.

== Standings ==
Pos	Team	Pld	W	L	PF	PA	PD
1	(Italy) Acea Roma	10	7	3	826	773	+53
2	(France) Nancy	10	6	4	776	742	+34
3	(Czech Republic) ČEZ Nymburk	10	5 (Note: Head-to-head: 2-0)	5	771	780	−9
4	(Spain) Sevilla	10	5 (Note: Head-to-head: 0-2)	5	776	757	+19
5	(Germany) Oldenburg	10	4	6	737	737	0
6	(Belgium) Spirou Charleroi	10	3	7	705	802	−97

Source: Euroleague Basketball

== Fixtures and results ==
=== Game 1 ===
15 October 2014

Nancy (France)	78–76	(Czech Republic) ČEZ Nymburk

15 October 2014

EWE Baskets Oldenburg (Germany)	77–85	(Spain) Baloncesto Sevilla

15 October 2014

Spirou Charleroi (Belgium)	59–88	(Italy) Virtus Roma

=== Game 2 ===
21 October 2014

ČEZ Nymburk (Czech Republic)	77–71	(Germany) EWE Baskets Oldenburg

22 October 2014

Baloncesto Sevilla (Spain)	80–75	(Belgium) Spirou Charleroi

22 October 2014

Virtus Roma (Italy)	84–79	(France) Nancy

=== Game 3 ===
29 October 2014

Virtus Roma (Italy)	84–82	(Spain) Baloncesto Sevilla

29 October 2014

Nancy (France)	72–67	(Germany) EWE Baskets Oldenburg

29 October 2014

Spirou Charleroi (Belgium)	82–73	(Czech Republic) ČEZ Nymburk

=== Game 4 ===
4 November 2014

EWE Baskets Oldenburg (Germany)	72–68	(Belgium) Spirou Charleroi

5 November 2014

ČEZ Nymburk (Czech Republic)	89–87	(Italy) Virtus Roma

5 November 2014

Nancy (France)	68–59	(Spain) Baloncesto Sevilla

=== Game 5 ===
12 November 2014

Baloncesto Sevilla (Spain)	65–66	(Czech Republic) ČEZ Nymburk

12 November 2014

Spirou Charleroi (Belgium)	73–88	(France) Nancy

12 November 2014

Virtus Roma (Italy)	83–81	(Germany) EWE Baskets Oldenburg

=== Game 6 ===
18 November 2014

Virtus Roma (Italy)	100–69	(Belgium) Spirou Charleroi

19 November 2014

ČEZ Nymburk (Czech Republic)	89–80	(France) Nancy

19 November 2014

Baloncesto Sevilla (Spain)	68–59	(Germany) EWE Baskets Oldenburg

=== Game 7 ===
26 November 2014

EWE Baskets Oldenburg (Germany)	84–71	(Czech Republic) ČEZ Nymburk

26 November 2014

Nancy (France)	64–76	(Italy) Virtus Roma

26 November 2014

Spirou Charleroi (Belgium)	82–72	(Spain) Baloncesto Sevilla

=== Game 8 ===
3 December 2014

ČEZ Nymburk (Czech Republic)	67–73	(Belgium) Spirou Charleroi

3 December 2014

EWE Baskets Oldenburg (Germany)	71–85	(France) Nancy

3 December 2014

Baloncesto Sevilla (Spain)	98–80	(Italy) Virtus Roma

=== Game 9 ===
9 December 2014

Virtus Roma (Italy)	78–72	(Czech Republic) ČEZ Nymburk

10 December 2014

Spirou Charleroi (Belgium)	62–75	(Germany) EWE Baskets Oldenburg

10 December 2014

Baloncesto Sevilla (Spain)	85–75	(France) Nancy

=== Game 10 ===
16 December 2014

ČEZ Nymburk (Czech Republic)	91–82	(Spain) Baloncesto Sevilla

17 December 2014

EWE Baskets Oldenburg (Germany)	80–66	(Italy) Virtus Roma

17 December 2014

Nancy (France)	87–62	(Belgium) Spirou Charleroi
