= Robin Lodders =

German basketball player (born 1994)

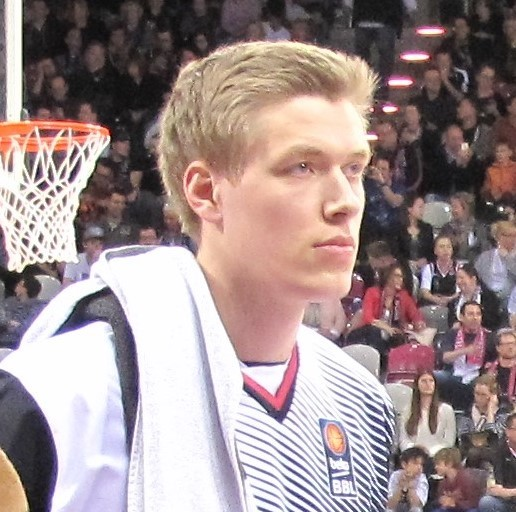
- Lodders with Telekom Baskets Bonn in 2016

No. 11 – BG Göttingen
- Position: Power forward / center
- League: ProA

Personal information
- Born: 30 November 1994 (age 31) Hanover, Germany
- Listed height: 6 ft 9 in (2.06 m)
- Listed weight: 231 lb (105 kg)

Career information
- Playing career: 2012–present

Career history
- 2014–2016: Bonn
- 2016–2017: ETB Schwarz-Weiß
- 2017–2020: Niners Chemnitz
- 2020–2021: Science City Jena
- 2021–2023: Rasta Vechta
- 2023–2025: Science City Jena
- 2025–present: BG Göttingen

Robin Carl Lodders (born 30 November 1994) is a German professional basketball player for BG Göttingen of the German ProA.

== Professional career ==
In the past, he played for the Telekom Baskets Bonn of the German Basketball League. He signed with Niners Chemnitz in 2017. He was part of the team that earned promotion to the BBL in the 2019–20 season.

On 15 July 2020 he signed with Science City Jena of the German ProA.

On 11 June 2021 he signed with Rasta Vechta of the German ProA.

On June 20, 2023, he signed with Science City Jena of the German ProA.

On June 5, 2025, he signed with BG Göttingen.
