= Marcel Keßen =

German basketball player (born 1997)

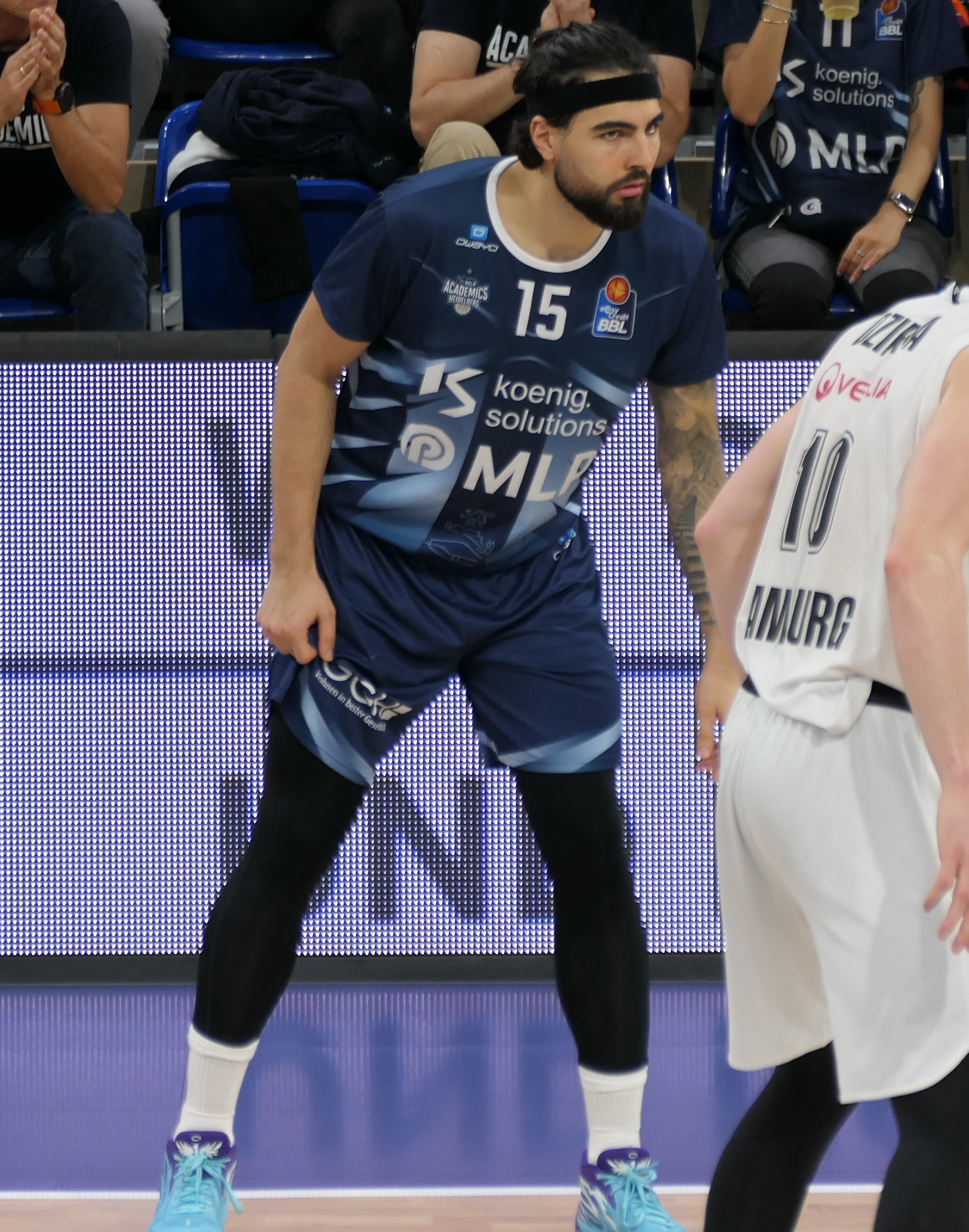
- Keßen playing for Heidelberg in 2023

No. 15 – Oldenburg
- Position: Center
- League: Basketball Bundesliga

Personal information
- Born: 2 January 1997 (age 29) Hagen, Germany
- Listed height: 6 ft 9 in (2.06 m)
- Listed weight: 240 lb (109 kg)

Career information
- Playing career: 2014–present

Career history
- 2014–2017: Phoenix Hagen
- 2017–2020: Baskets Oldenburg
- 2020–2021: Eisbären Bremerhaven
- 2021–2023: Phoenix Hagen
- 2023–2026: USC Heidelberg
- 2026–present: Baskets Oldenburg

Career highlights
- German U16 national team; German U18 national team; German U20 national team

Marcel Theodor Keßen (alternative spelling Kessen; born 2 January 1997) is a German professional basketball player for Baskets Oldenburg of the Basketball Bundesliga. He plays as a center.

== Early life ==
Keßen is a native of Hagen-Hohenlimburg.

== Club career ==
In January 2021, he returned to Phoenix Hagen after a 3-year absence.

In June 2022, under the lead of coach Chris Harris, Keßen became Hagen's new team captain. He succeeded Dominik Spohr for this position. In the 2022–23 season, Keßen advanced to become Hagen's second-best scorer with an average of 14.3 points. He was his team's top rebounder (6.4). Out of 29 games played, he was in the starting lineup 27 times and had an excellent three-point percentage of 43 percent.

In 2023, he joined MLP Academics Heidelberg.

On 28 May 2026 he joined EWE Baskets Oldenburg of the BBL.

== Player profile ==
Keßen mostly plays the Center position.

Keßen has been described as "a verbally extroverted" player.
