= Tyron McCoy =

American basketball player and coach

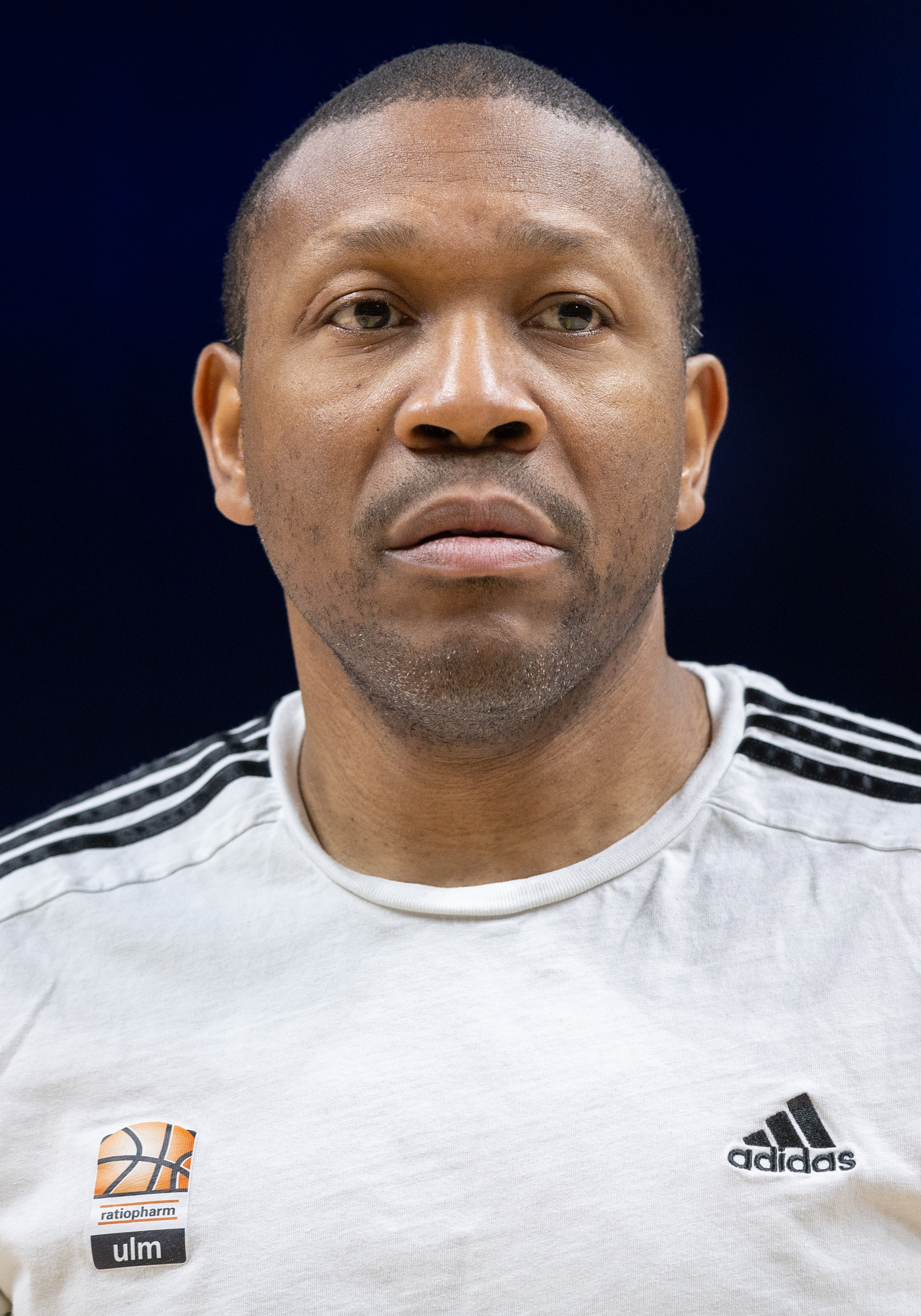
- McCoy in 2025

Ratiopharm Ulm
- Title: Assistant coach
- League: Basketball Bundesliga; EuroCup

Personal information
- Born: November 20, 1972 (age 53)
- Listed height: 6 ft 5 in (1.96 m)
- Listed weight: 200 lb (91 kg)

Career information
- High school: Bethune (Bethune, South Carolina)
- College: VCU (1991–1995)
- NBA draft: 1995: undrafted
- Playing career: 1995–2008
- Position: Shooting guard
- Number: 12, 14
- Coaching career: 2008–present

Career history

Playing
- 1995–1996: Floriana
- 1996–1998: Union Gmunden
- 1998–1999: MTV 1846 Gießen
- 1999–2000: TV 1860 Lich
- 2000–2001: Skyliners Frankfurt
- 2001–2007: EWE Baskets Oldenburg
- 2007–2008: Bayer Giants Leverkusen

Coaching
- 2008–2010: Ludwigsburg (assistant)
- 2010–2013: Artland Dragons (assistant)
- 2013–2015: Artland Dragons
- 2015–2017: Tigers Tübingen
- 2018–present: Ratiopharm Ulm (assistant)

Career highlights
- German League Top Scorer (2000); No. 14 retired by EWE Baskets Oldenburg

Clement Tyron McCoy (born November 20, 1972) is an American professional basketball coach, and former professional basketball player. At a height of 6 ft 5 in (1.96 m), he played at the shooting guard position.

== Playing career ==
=== High school ===
McCoy attended and played high school basketball at Bethune High School, in Bethune, South Carolina.

=== College career ===
McCoy played college basketball at Virginia Commonwealth University. He scored 1,456 points over the span of his four-year career at VCU, leading the Rams in points per game (15.2), as a senior.

=== Professional career ===
Upon graduating from college in 1995, McCoy spent 13 years playing professionally in Austria, Malta, and Germany. In his ten years in the German top-flight Basketball Bundesliga, he registered 4,792 points scored in 285 games played, while representing MTV Gießen, TV Lich, the Frankfurt Skyliners, EWE Baskets Oldenburg, and Bayer Leverkusen. McCoy's career accolades include four Bundesliga All-Star Game appearances (1999, 2001, 2003, 2005), five Eurobasket.com All-Bundesliga Imports First Team selections (1999, 2000, 2001, 2003, 2005), and two Eurobasket.com All-Bundesliga Defensive Team selections (2000, 2001).

In September 2010, he had his jersey number 14 retired by the Oldenburg team, and was added to the club's Hall of Fame.

== Coaching career ==
McCoy's career on the sidelines began in 2008 as an assistant coach at German Bundesliga side EnBW Ludwigsburg. Following a two-year stint at Ludwigsburg, he served as an assistant with the Artland Dragons from 2010 to 2013, before being promoted to the head coach position prior to the 2013-14 campaign. He guided the Dragons to a trip to the 2014 Bundesliga semifinals, ending the reign of four-time champion Bamberg in the quarterfinals. McCoy was a coach at the 2014 Bundesliga All-Star game and received 2014 Eurobasket.com All-Bundesliga Coach of the Year honors. The Artland Dragons withdrew from Germany's top-flight at the conclusion of the 2014–15 season, which ended McCoy's tenure as head coach of the Quakenbrück-based club.

In December 2015, he took over as head coach of another German Bundesliga team, the Walter Tigers Tübingen. McCoy was sacked on November 20, 2017, after having opened the 2017–18 season with ten straight losses.

On June 13, 2018, McCoy was named assistant coach of German Bundesliga side Ratiopharm Ulm. As an assistant coach, he contributed to the team's German championship victory in the 2022–23 season.
