= 2013 BBL-Pokal =

BBL-Pokal
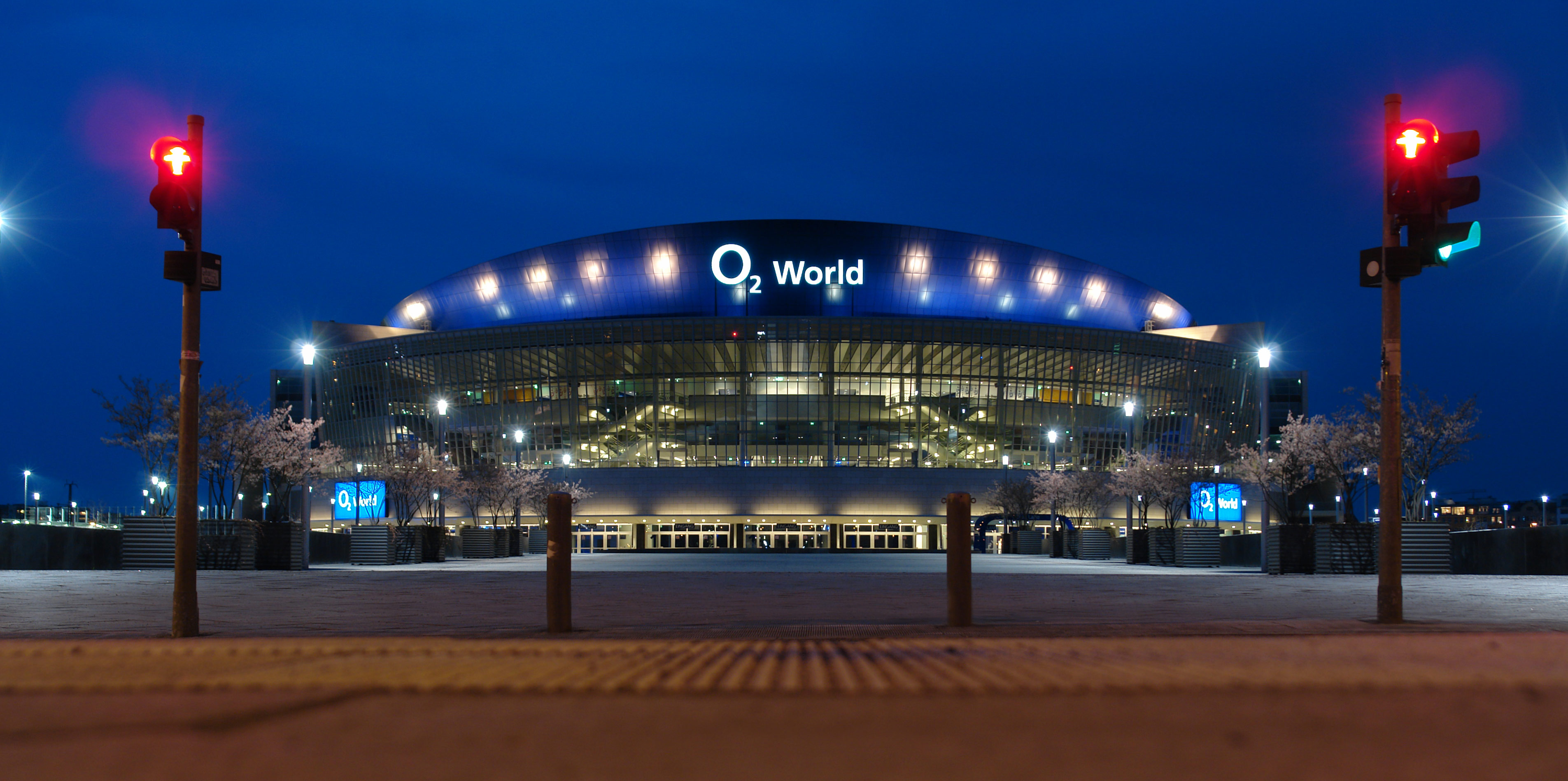
- The O2 Arena was the venue for the Final Four
- Games played: 7
- Teams: 7

Finals
- Champions: Alba Berlin (7th title)
- Runners-up: ratiopharm Ulm
- Third place: Artland Dragons
- Fourth place: Bayern Munich

The 2013 BBL-Pokal – officially named 2013 Beko BBL-Pokal because of sponsorship reasons – was the 46th season of the German Basketball Cup. It was the 4th season as the League Cup for the BBL. The Final Four was held at the O2 World in Berlin, which gained ALBA Berlin automatic qualification for the tournament. The other 6 participating teams were selected through the standings of the first half of the 2012–13 Basketball Bundesliga.

Home team ALBA Berlin won the BBL-Pokal, by beating ratiopharm Ulm 85–67 in the Final.

== Participants ==
The following six teams qualified based on their standings in the 2012–13 Basketball Bundesliga.

1. Brose Baskets
2. EWE Baskets Oldenburg
3. Bayern Munich
4. ratiopharm Ulm
5. Artland Dragons
6. TBB Trier

ALBA Berlin was qualified because the Final Four was played at their home court.

== Bracket ==
Quarterfinals
1	Brose Baskets	69
3	Bayern Munich	77
5	Artland Dragons	78
2	EWE Baskets Oldenburg	77
4	ratiopharm Ulm	99
6	TBB Trier	77

Semifinals
–	ALBA Berlin	92
2	Bayern Munich	83
5	Artland Dragons	77
4	ratiopharm Ulm	86

Finals
–	ALBA Berlin	85
4	ratiopharm Ulm	67
Third place
5	Artland Dragons	76
2	Bayern Munich	88
