= 2014 BBL-Pokal =

BBL-Pokal
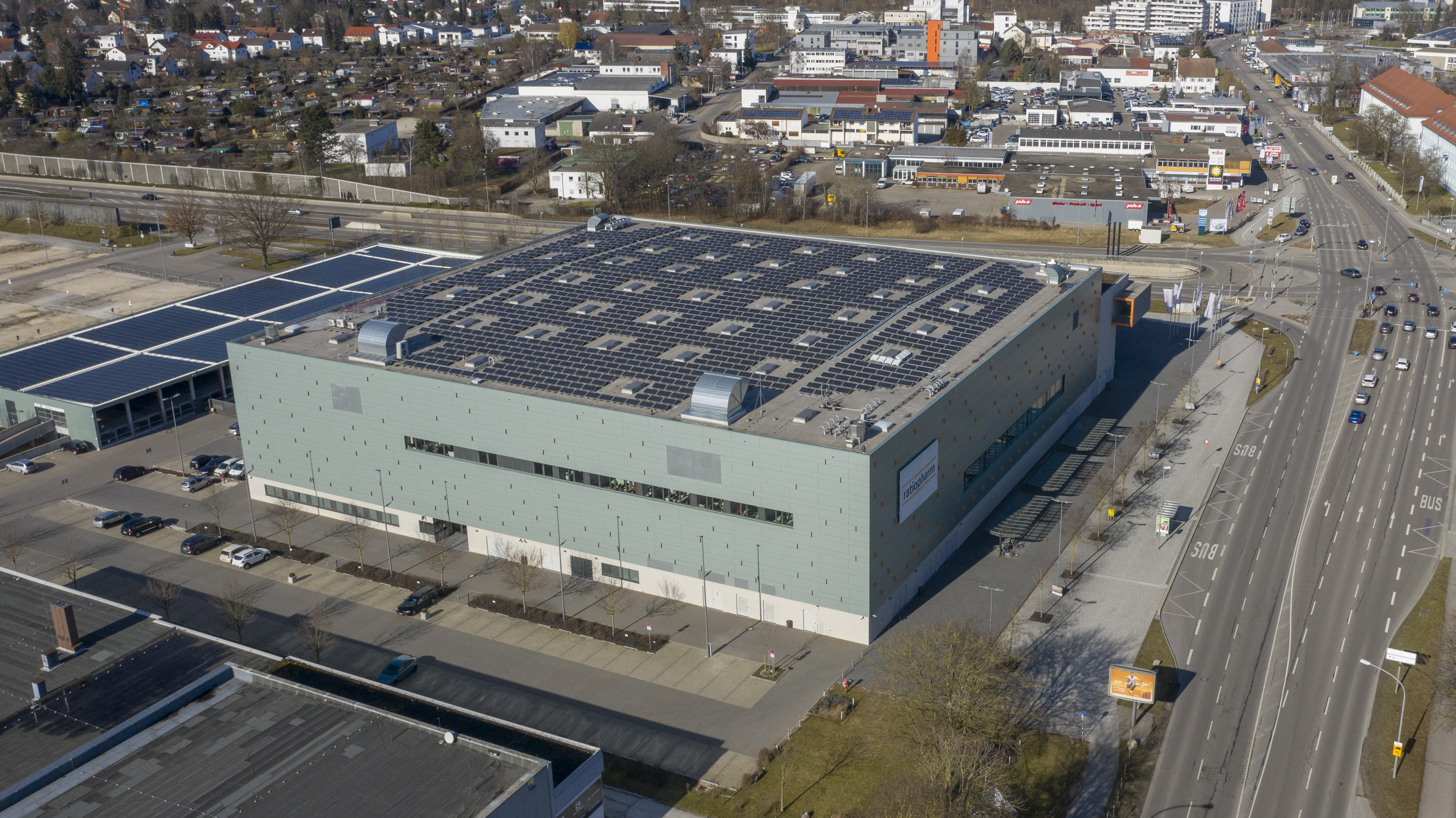
- The Final Four was played at the ratiopharm Arena
- Games played: 7
- Teams: 7

Finals
- Champions: Alba Berlin (8th title)
- Runners-up: ratiopharm Ulm
- Third place: Brose Baskets
- Fourth place: Bayern Munich

The 2014 BBL-Pokal – officially 2014 Beko BBL-Pokal for sponsorship reasons – was the 47th season of the German Basketball Cup. The Final Four was held in Ulm, which gained ratiopharm Ulm automatic qualification. The other six participating teams were selected through the standings in the 2013–14 Basketball Bundesliga. ALBA Berlin defended their title.

== Participants ==
The following six teams qualified based on their standings in the 2013–14 BBL.

1. Bayern Munich
2. Brose Baskets
3. ALBA Berlin
4. EWE Baskets Oldenburg
5. Telekom Baskets Bonn
6. Artland Dragons

Ratiopharm Ulm was qualified because the Final Four was played on their home court.

== Bracket ==
Quarterfinals
ratiopharm Ulm
Bye
1	Bayern Munich	76
6	Artland Dragons	61
3	Alba Berlin	88
5	Telekom Baskets Bonn	87
4	EWE Baskets Oldenburg	83
2	Brose Baskets	90

Semifinals
ratiopharm Ulm	90
1	Bayern Munich	72
3	Alba Berlin	83
2	Brose Baskets	67

Finals
ratiopharm Ulm	80
3	Alba Berlin	86
Third place
1	Bayern Munich	73
2	Brose Baskets	79

=== Quarterfinals ===
5 February 2014
19:00

Boxscore

EWE Baskets Oldenburg	83–90	Brose Baskets
Scoring by quarter: 17–24, 18–20, 22–19, 26–27
Pts: Philipp Neumann 21; Rebs: Kramer, Neumann 5 Asts: Jenkins, Joyce 4		Pts: D'or Fischer 19; Rebs: Rakim Sanders 6 Asts: Anton Gavel 5

Small EWE Arena, Oldenburg
Attendance: 3,037
Referees: Boris Schmidt, Martin Matip, Markus Hesse

5 February 2014
20:00

Boxscore

Bayern Munich	76–61	Artland Dragons
Scoring by quarter: 20–17, 13–10, 23–17, 20–17
Pts: Bryant, Thompson 18; Rebs: Bryant, Savović 7 Asts: Malcolm Delaney 6		Pts: Anthony King 17; Rebs: Lawrence Hill 6 Asts: Brandon Thomas 4

Audi Dome, Munich
Attendance: 4,866
Referees: Robert Lottermoser, Clemens Fritz, Oliver Krause

5 February 2014
20:00

Boxscore

Alba Berlin	88–87	Telekom Baskets Bonn
Scoring by quarter: 30–21, 9–23, 24–20, 25–23
Pts: Reggie Redding 18; Rebs: Leon Radošević 8 Asts: Hammonds, Kendall 4		Pts: Tony Gaffney 28; Rebs: Benas Veikalas 8 Asts: Jared Jordan 11

O2 World, Berlin
Attendance: 8,741
Referees: Moritz Reiter, Neša Kovačević

=== Semifinals ===
29 March 2014
17:00

Boxscore

Alba Berlin	83–67	Brose Baskets
Scoring by quarter: 21–20, 15–16, 25–19, 22–12
Pts: Logan, Radošević 15; Rebs: Jan Jagla 8 Asts: Reggie Redding 6		Pts: Anton Gavel 18; Rebs: Sharrod Ford 6 Asts: Jared Jordan 5

Arena Ulm/Neu-Ulm, Ulm
Attendance: 6,000
Referees: Boris Schmidt, Martin Matip, Clemens Fritz

29 March 2014
20:00

Boxscore

Bayern Munich	72–90	ratiopharm Ulm
Scoring by quarter: 14–22, 10–17, 27–21, 21–30
Pts: John Bryant 17; Rebs: John Bryant 10; Asts: Malcolm Delaney 4		Pts: Cameron Long 19; Rebs: Matt Howard 12; Asts: Cameron Long 6

Arena Ulm/Neu-Ulm, Ulm
Attendance: 6,000
Referees: Robert Lottermoser, Moritz Reiter, Christof Madinger

=== Third place game ===
30 March 2014
12:00

Boxscore

Brose Baskets	79–73	Bayern Munich
Scoring by quarter: 16–17, 19–17, 21–26, 23–13
Pts: Rakim Sanders 25; Rebs: Rakim Sanders 8 Asts: Jared Jordan 10		Pts: Malcolm Delaney 13; Rebs: Deon Thompson 8 Asts: Delaney, Staiger 3

Arena Ulm/Neu-Ulm, Ulm
Attendance: 6,000
Referees: Martin Matip, Boris Schmidt, Clemens Fritz

=== Final ===
30 March 2014
15:00

Boxscore

Alba Berlin	86–80	ratiopharm Ulm
Scoring by quarter: 21–26, 24–15, 26–17, 15–22
Pts: Cliff Hammonds 19; Rebs: three players 7 Asts: Reggie Redding 7		Pts: Per Günther 25; Rebs: Will Clyburn 6 Asts: Per Günther 7

Arena Ulm/Neu-Ulm, Ulm
Attendance: 6,000
Referees: Robert Lottermoser, Moritz Reiter, Christhof Madinger
