= BG Göttingen =

Professional basketball team in Göttingen, Germany

- Nickname: Die Veilchen (The Violets)
- Leagues: ProA
- Founded: 1974; 52 years ago
- History: BG Göttingen (1974–present)
- Arena: Sparkassen-Arena
- Capacity: 3,447
- Location: Göttingen, Niedersachsen, Germany
- Team colors: Purple, White
- General manager: Frank Meinertshagen
- Team captain: Mathis Mönninghoff
- Championships: 1 EuroChallenge; 1 ProA
- Website: www.bggoettingen.de
Home	Away

Basketballgemeinschaft Göttingen (English: Basketball Association Göttingen) is a German basketball club based in Göttingen, Germany. In 2010, the club won the EuroChallenge against Krasnye Krylya Samara from Russia. The team plays in Germany's second division, the ProA.

== History ==
Once BG 74 Göttingen was promoted to the Basketball Bundesliga in 2007, the professional team was separated from the club. In its first Bundesliga season, Göttingen managed to avoid relegation. In the following years the club would have some excellent performances, with consecutive playoff appearances.

In the 2009–10 season, Göttingen made its debut in Europe by playing in the EuroChallenge. The team immediately made its mark as it won the competition after having a 13–3 record overall. In the Final Four, which was hosted by Göttingen, the club beat Russian side Krasnye Krylia 83–75 in the Final. In the following two seasons the club played in Europe as well. However, in the 2011–12 season Göttingen were relegated from the German second division ProA.

In 2014, the team returned to the Bundesliga, after winning the ProA title by beating the Crailsheim Merlins in the Finals.

In the 2022–23 season, Göttingen achieved the sixth spot in the regular season of the Bundesliga. This earned them a spot in the play-offs for the first time in 12 years. In the play-offs they met Bayern München, who swept Göttingen 3–0. This success earned Göttingen however a spot in the FIBA Europe Cup for the 2023–24 season.

In this 2023–24 season, Göttingen couldn't equal their domestic success of the previous year. They fought most of the season to stay above the degradation zone and ended the regular season on the 14th spot. On the European level the Göttinger team was more successful, reaching the second round of the FIBA Europe Cup.

In the 2024–25 season, Göttingen had a disastrous year in which they accumulated only 3 wins in the regular season and 1 win in the domestic cup. This resulted in the relegation of the club back to the Pro A after a ten-year stay in the German top-tier basketball league.

== Honours ==
=== Domestic competitions ===
- 2. Basketball Bundesliga / ProA:
  - Winners: 2006–07, 2013–14

=== European competitions ===
- EuroChallenge:
  - Winners: 2009–10

== Team ==
=== Current roster ===
Note: Flags indicate national team eligibility at FIBA-sanctioned events. Players may hold other non-FIBA nationalities not displayed.

BG Göttingen roster
Players
Coaches

Pos.	No.	Nat.	Name	Ht.	Wt.
G	0	(Germany)	Schmitz, Nils	1.88 m (6 ft 2 in)	85 kg (187 lb)	25 – 14 June 2001
F	2	(United States)	Watson, Zac	2.01 m (6 ft 7 in)	99 kg (218 lb)	26 – 4 February 2000
G	4	(Germany)	Kirchner, Daniel	1.87 m (6 ft 2 in)	82 kg (181 lb)	29 – 26 October 1997
G	5	(Germany)	Bode, Emil	1.96 m (6 ft 5 in)	90 kg (198 lb)	20 – 7 November 2006
G	9	(Lithuania)	Kneizys, Radvilas	1.93 m (6 ft 4 in)	86 kg (190 lb)	23 – 23 January 2003
C	11	(Germany)	Lodders, Robin	2.06 m (6 ft 9 in)	107 kg (236 lb)	31 – 30 November 1994
G	13	(Germany)	Nguyen, Gaston	1.80 m (5 ft 11 in)	70 kg (154 lb)	18 – 12 March 2008
F	17	(Germany)	Mönninghoff, Mathis (C)	2.00 m (6 ft 7 in)	91 kg (201 lb)	34 – 17 March 1992
F	21	(United States)	Jackson, Zach	1.99 m (6 ft 6 in)	90 kg (198 lb)	29 – 13 August 1997
C	29	(Bosnia and Herzegovina)	Pajić, Omar	2.05 m (6 ft 9 in)	105 kg (231 lb)	27 – 24 August 1999
G	33	(United States)	Bibbs, Tai	1.90 m (6 ft 3 in)	86 kg (190 lb)	27 – 21 February 1999

Head coach

- (Latvia) Mārtiņš Gulbis

Assistant coach(es)

- (Lithuania) Martynas Airosius

Legend

- (C) Team captain
- Injured

- Roster
Updated: November 11, 2026

=== Notable players ===
Note: Flags indicate national team eligibility at FIBA-sanctioned events. Players may hold other non-FIBA nationalities not displayed.

Criteria

To appear in this section a player must have either:

- Set a club record or won an individual award while at the club
- Played at least one official international match for their national team at any time
- Played at least one official NBA match at any time.

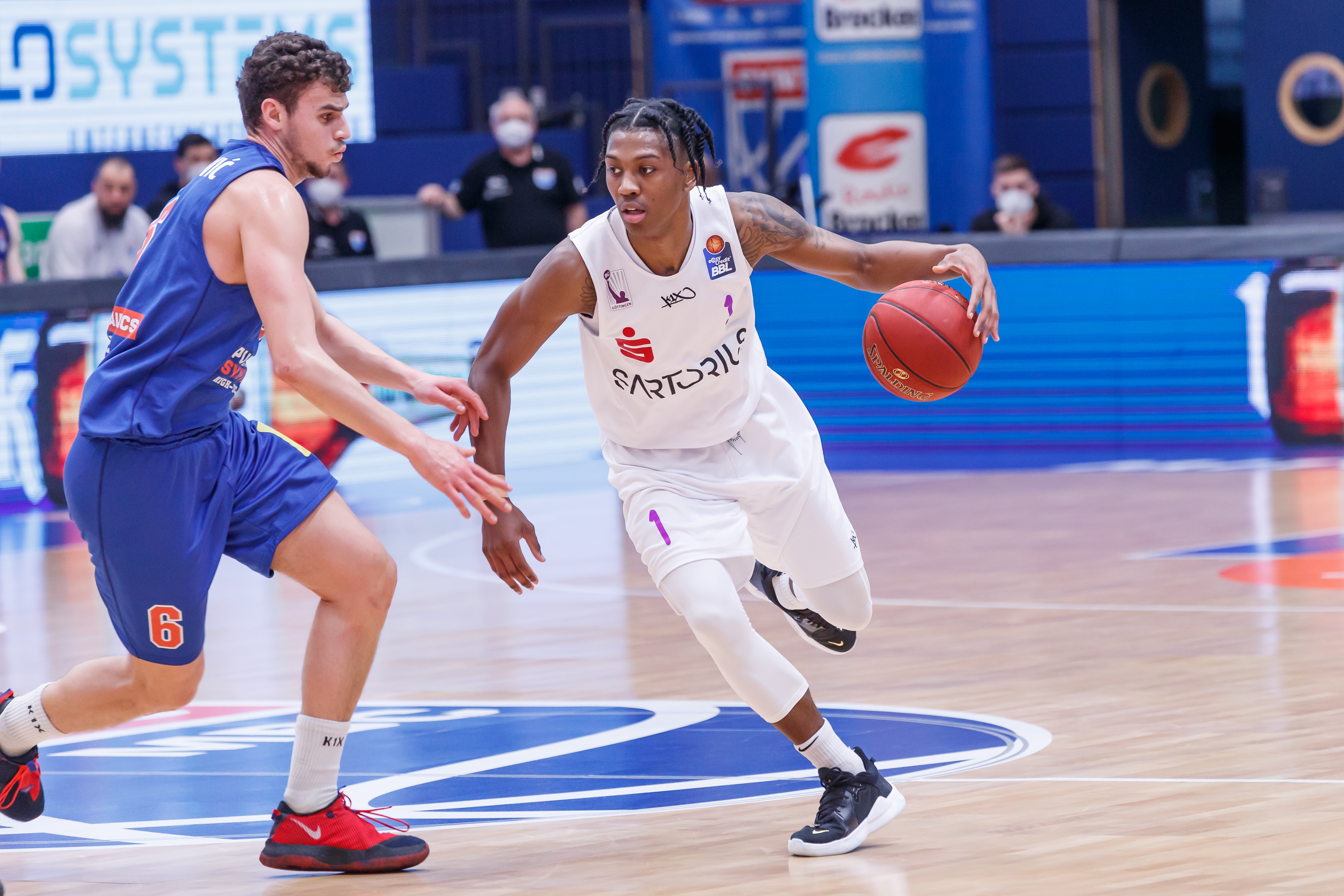
Deishuan Booker with the ball for Göttingen

- (Australia) Mitch Creek
- (Finland) Max Besselink
- (Puerto Rico) Tai Odiase
- (United States) Kyle Bailey
- (United States) James L. Dickey III
- (United States) Jeb Ivey
- (United States) Trenton Meacham
- (United States) Taylor Rochestie
- (United States) (Greece) Nicholas Livas
- (United States) (Israel) Will Rayman

== Season by season ==
Season	Tier	League	Pos.	German Cup	European competitions		
2000–01	2	2. BBL	6th				
2001–02	2	2. BBL	8th				
2002–03	2	2. BBL	11th				
2003–04	2	2. BBL	7th				
2004–05	2	2. BBL	5th				
2005–06	2	2. BBL	7th				
2006–07	2	2. BBL	1st				
2007–08	1	Bundesliga	14th				
2008–09	1	Bundesliga	5th				
2009–10	1	Bundesliga	7th	Fourth position	3 EuroChallenge	C	13–3
2010–11	1	Bundesliga	7th		2 Eurocup	QF	8–1–5
2011–12	1	Bundesliga	18th		3 EuroChallenge	RS	0–6
2012–13	2	ProA	5th				
2013–14	2	ProA	1st				
2014–15	1	Bundesliga	10th	Quarter-finalist			
2015–16	1	Bundesliga	16th				
2016–17	1	Bundesliga	11th				
2017–18	1	Bundesliga	14th				
2018–19	1	Bundesliga	14th	Round of 16			
2019–20	1	Bundesliga	8th	Quarterfinals			
2020–21	1	Bundesliga	12th	Semifinals			
2021–22	1	Bundesliga	10th	Round of 16			
2022–23	1	Bundesliga	6th	Quarterfinals	4 Europe Cup	Q	1–1
2023–24	1	Bundesliga	14th	Round of 16	3 Champions League	Q	0–1
2023–24	1	Bundesliga	14th	Round of 16	4 Europe Cup	2R	8–4
2024–25	1	Bundesliga	17th	Quarterfinals			
2025–26	2	ProA	6th	First round			
2026–27	2	ProA		First round			
