= Reggie Redding =

American basketball player and coach (born 1988)

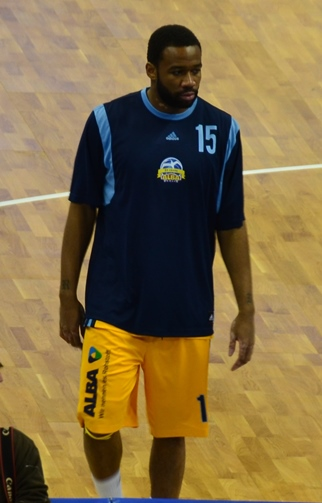
- Redding with Alba Berlin in 2014

Philadelphia 76ers
- Title: Player development coach
- League: NBA

Personal information
- Born: July 18, 1988 (age 37) Philadelphia, Pennsylvania, U.S.
- Listed height: 6 ft 4 in (1.93 m)
- Listed weight: 233 lb (106 kg)

Career information
- High school: Saint Joseph's Preparatory (Philadelphia, Pennsylvania)
- College: Villanova (2006–2010)
- NBA draft: 2010: undrafted
- Playing career: 2010–2021
- Position: Shooting guard / small forward

Career history
- 2010–2011: ETHA Engomis
- 2011–2013: Tigers Tübingen
- 2013–2015: Alba Berlin
- 2015–2016: Darüşşafaka
- 2016–2018: Bayern Munich
- 2018–2019: Türk Telekom
- 2019–2020: Partizan

Career highlights
- German Cup winner (2014); Cypriot League champion (2011); Cypriot Cup winner (2011); All-EuroCup Second Team (2014); All-BBL First Team (2014); All-BBL Second Team (2013); 3× BBL All-Star (2013–2015)

Reginald Edward Redding Jr. (born July 18, 1988) is an American former professional basketball player who is a player development coach for the Philadelphia 76ers of the National Basketball Association (NBA). He played college basketball at Villanova University.

== Professional career ==
After going undrafted in the 2010 NBA draft, Redding signed with ETHA Engomis of the Cypriot League for the 2010–11 season.

In July 2011, he signed a one-year deal with Tigers Tübingen of the German Basketball Bundesliga. He later resigned with them for one more season.

In July 2013, he signed a two-year deal with Alba Berlin. He was named to the All-EuroCup Second Team in 2014. He was also named to the All-BBL First Team the same year.

On June 17, 2015, he signed a two-year contract with the Turkish team Darüşşafaka.

On August 2, 2016, he left Darüşşafaka and joined Bayern Munich for the 2016–17 season. On July 18, 2017, he re-signed with Bayern for one more season.

=== The Basketball Tournament (2017) ===
In the summer of 2017, Redding competed in The Basketball Tournament on ESPN for Supernova; a team composed of Villanova University basketball alum. In two games, he averaged 13.5 points, 2.5 assists and 1.5 rebounds per game to help the number two seeded Supernova advance to the second-round where they were defeated 82-74 by Team Fancy. Redding also competed for the Liberty Ballers in 2015. In three games that summer, he averaged 14.7 points, 5.0 assists and 3.0 rebounds per game.

== Career statistics ==
Legend
GP	Games played	GS	Games started	MPG	Minutes per game
FG%	Field-goal percentage	3P%	3-point field-goal percentage	FT%	Free-throw percentage
RPG	Rebounds per game	APG	Assists per game	SPG	Steals per game
BPG	Blocks per game	PPG	Points per game	PIR	Performance index rating
**Bold**	Career high

=== EuroLeague ===
Year	Team	GP	GS	MPG	FG%	3P%	FT%	RPG	APG	SPG	BPG	PPG	PIR
2014–15	Alba Berlin	**24**	15	**29.1**	**.456**	**.365**	**.784**	**4.7**	**3.9**	.7	**.4**	**12.4**	**12.9**
2015–16	Darüşşafaka	**24**	**19**	21.3	.431	.324	.717	3.0	2.5	**.8**	.2	6.8	7.5
Career		48	34	25.2	.447	.350	.747	3.8	3.2	.8	.3	9.5	10.2
