= 2008–09 Basketball Bundesliga =

German basketball season

Basketball Bundesliga
- Season: 2008–09
- Dates: 20 September 2008 – 9 May 2009
- Teams: 18

Regular season
- Season MVP: (United States) Jason Gardner
- Relegated: LTi Gießen 46ers Eisbären Bremerhaven

Finals
- Champions: EWE Oldenburg (1st title)
- Runners-up: Telekom Bonn
- Finals MVP: (United States) Rickey Paulding

The Basketball Bundesliga 2008–09 was the 43rd season of the Basketball Bundesliga.

== Teams ==
BBL 2008/2009 - Club Locations.

Team	City/Area
Brose Baskets	Bamberg
ALBA Berlin	Berlin
Telekom Baskets Bonn	Bonn
New Yorker Phantoms Braunschweig	Braunschweig
Eisbären Bremerhaven	Bremerhaven
Deutsche Bank Skyliners	Frankfurt
LTi Giessen 46ers	Gießen
MEG Göttingen	Göttingen
Giants Nördlingen	Nördlingen
Köln 99ers	Cologne
Giants Düsseldorf	Düsseldorf
EnBW Ludwigsburg	Ludwigsburg
EWE Baskets Oldenburg	Oldenburg
Paderborn Baskets	Paderborn
Artland Dragons	Quakenbrück
TBB Trier	Trier
WALTER Tigers Tübingen	Tübingen
Ratiopharm Ulm	Ulm

== Main Round Standings ==
#	Team	Wins	Losses	Points	Points For:Against	Plus/Minus
1	Alba Berlin	26	8	52:16	2712:2392	+320
2	MEG Göttingen	25	9	50:18	2566:2396	+170
3	EWE Baskets Oldenburg	25	9	50:18	2667:2488	+179
4	Telekom Baskets Bonn	22	12	44:24	2564:2478	+86
5	ratiopharm Ulm	21	13	42:26	2678:2644	+34
6	Deutsche Bank Skyliners	21	13	42:26	2442:2301	+141
7	Brose Baskets Bamberg	19	15	38:30	2508:2373	+135
8	Paderborn Baskets	18	16	36:32	2607:2563	+44
9	Artland Dragons	18	16	36:32	2633:2606	+27
10	TBB Trier	16	18	32:36	2588:2623	-35
11	EnBW Ludwigsburg	16	18	32:36	2307:2432	-125
12	Giants Düsseldorf	14	20	28:40	2616:2701	-85
13	New Yorker Phantoms Braunschweig	14	20	28:40	2452:2455	-3
14	WALTER Tigers Tübingen	14	20	28:40	2566:2638	-72
15	Köln 99ers	11	23	22:46	2486:2628	-142
16	Giants Nördlingen	11	23	22:46	2466:2619	-153
17	LTi Giessen 46ers	8	26	16:52	2400:2644	-244
18	Eisbären Bremerhaven	7	27	14:54	2553:2830	-277

= Qualification for Playoffs
= Relegation to Pro A

== Playoffs ==
Quarterfinals
1	ALBA Berlin	78	68	77	80	66
8	Paderborn Baskets	71	71	67	85	58
4	Telekom Baskets Bonn	71	71	82	X	X
5	Ratiopharm Ulm	62	69	68	X	X
2	MEG Göttingen	84	69	60	68	X
7	Brose Baskets	76	76	72	84	X
3	EWE Baskets Oldenburg	79	77	61	72	X
6	Deutsche Bank Skyliners	69	79	50	69	X

Semifinals
1	ALBA Berlin	71	72	65	62	71
4	Telekom Baskets Bonn	73	75	39	52	82
7	Brose Baskets	74	58	85	X	X
3	EWE Baskets Oldenburg	82	66	88	X	X

Finals
4	Telekom Baskets Bonn	74	70	81	66	70
3	EWE Baskets Oldenburg	72	79	78	82	71

== See also ==
- Basketball Bundesliga 2009–10
- German champions
