= 2011–12 Basketball Bundesliga =

Basketball Bundesliga 2011-12
- League: Basketball Bundesliga
- Sport: Basketball
- Duration: October 3, 2011 – April 28, 2012

Regular season
- Top seed: Brose Baskets
- Season MVP: (United States) John Bryant (ratiopharm Ulm)
- Top scorer: (United States) Bobby Brown (EWE Baskets Oldenburg)

Finals
- Champions: Brose Baskets
- Runners-up: ratiopharm Ulm
- Finals MVP: (United States) P. J. Tucker

BBL seasons
- ← 2010–11 2012–13 →

The Basketball Bundesliga 2011–12 was the 46th season of the Basketball Bundesliga (BBL). Brose Baskets from Bamberg won its third straight title this season, by beating ratiopharm Ulm 3–0 in the Finals.

== Teams ==
BBL 2011–12 – Club Locations

Team	City/Area	Arena	Arena Capacity	10–11 Ranking
Brose Baskets	Bamberg	Stechert Arena	6800	1st / PO / champion
BBC Bayreuth	Bayreuth	Oberfrankenhalle	4000	16th
ALBA Berlin	Berlin	O_{2} World	14500	3rd / PO
Telekom Baskets Bonn	Bonn	Telekom Dome	6000	13th
New Yorker Phantoms Braunschweig	Braunschweig	Volkswagen Halle	6100	5th / PO
Eisbären Bremerhaven	Bremerhaven	Stadthalle Bremerhaven	4050	8th / PO
Fraport Skyliners	Frankfurt	Fraport Arena	5002	2nd / PO
LTi Giessen 46ers	Gießen	Sporthalle Gießen-Ost	4003	15th
BG Göttingen	Göttingen	Sparkassen-Arena	3447	7th / PO
Phoenix Hagen	Hagen	ENERVIE Arena	3402	11th
EnBW Ludwigsburg	Ludwigsburg	Arena Ludwigsburg	5300	9th
Bayern Munich	Munich	Audi Dome	6700	Pro A: 1st / promotion
EWE Baskets Oldenburg	Oldenburg	Kleine EWE Arena	3148	6th / PO
Artland Dragons	Quakenbrück	Artland-Arena	3000	4th / PO
TBB Trier	Trier	Arena Trier	5900	10th
Walter Tigers Tübingen	Tübingen	Paul Horn-Arena	3132	12th
Ratiopharm Ulm	Ulm	Ratiopharm Arena	6000	14th
s.Oliver Baskets	Würzburg	s. Oliver Arena	3140	Pro A: 2nd / promotion

PO: Playoff; Rel: Relegation; Pro A: Division below BBL

== Main round standings ==
#	Team	Wins	Losses	Points	Points For:Against	Plus/Minus
1	Brose Baskets	30	4	60:8	3033:2387	+646
2	Ratiopharm Ulm	27	7	54:14	2778:2539	+239
3	ALBA Berlin	26	8	52:16	2825:2478	+347
4	Artland Dragons	24	10	48:20	2870:2655	+215
5	Bayern Munich	22	12	44:24	2672:2513	+159
6	s.Oliver Baskets	20	14	40:28	2431:2295	+136
7	New Yorker Phantoms Braunschweig	18	16	36:32	2645:2651	-6
8	Telekom Baskets Bonn	18	16	36:32	2730:2618	+112
9	Fraport Skyliners	17	17	34:34	2347:2337	+10
10	EWE Baskets Oldenburg	16	18	32:36	2736:2755	-19
11	Eisbären Bremerhaven	16	18	32:36	2626:2731	-105
12	WALTER Tigers Tübingen	15	19	30:38	2628:2719	-91
13	BBC Bayreuth	12	22	24:44	2537:2643	-286
14	TBB Trier	11	23	22:46	2297:2509	-212
15	Phoenix Hagen	11	23	22:46	2689:3016	-327
16	EnBW Ludwigsburg	10	24	20:48	2601:2655	-54
17	LTi Giessen 46ers	9	25	18:50	2341:2645	-304
18	BG Göttingen	4	30	8:60	2327:2787	-460

= Qualification for Playoffs
= Relegation to Pro A

== Playoffs ==
Quarterfinals
1	Brose Baskets	3
8	Telekom Baskets Bonn	1
4	Artland Dragons	3
5	Bayern Munich	2
2	Ratiopharm Ulm	3
7	NY Phantoms Braunschweig	0
3	Alba Berlin	1
6	s.Oliver Baskets	3

Semifinals
1	Brose Baskets	3
4	Artland Dragons	0
2	Ratiopharm Ulm	3
6	s.Oliver Baskets	0

Finals
1	Brose Baskets	3
2	Ratiopharm Ulm	0

== See also ==
- Basketball Bundesliga 2010–11
- German champions
