= Jason Gardner =

American basketball player/coach

Arizona Wildcats
- Title: Director of player relations
- League: Big-12 Conference

Personal information
- Born: November 14, 1980 (age 46) Indianapolis, Indiana, U.S.
- Listed height: 5 ft 10 in (1.78 m)
- Listed weight: 187 lb (85 kg)

Career information
- High school: North Central (Indianapolis, Indiana)
- College: Arizona (1999–2003)
- NBA draft: 2003: undrafted
- Playing career: 2003–2011
- Position: Point guard
- Number: 22
- Coaching career: 2011–present

Career history

Playing
- 2003: Krka Novo Mesto
- 2003–2005: Oostende
- 2005–2006: Ironi Ramat Gan
- 2006–2007: Telekom Baskets Bonn
- 2007–2010: EWE Oldenburg

Coaching
- 2011–2013: Loyola (Chicago) (assistant)
- 2013–2014: Memphis (assistant)
- 2014–2019: IUPUI
- 2020–2021: North Central HS
- 2021–present: Arizona (dir. player relations)

Career highlights
- German League MVP (2009); 2× All-German League Team (2008, 2009); Consensus second-team All-American (2003); Third-team All-American – AP, NABC (2002); Frances Pomeroy Naismith Award (2003); 3× First-team All-Pac-10 (2000, 2002, 2003); USBWA National Freshman of the Year (2000); No. 22 retired by Arizona Wildcats; McDonald's All-American (1999); Second-team Parade All-American (1999); Fourth-team Parade All-American (1998); Indiana Mr. Basketball (1999)

Jason Corey Gardner (born November 14, 1980) is an American retired professional basketball player and currently a player relations director at the University of Arizona.

Gardner is a native of Indianapolis, Indiana, playing his high school ball at North Central High School. He was honored at Indiana Mr. Basketball in 1999. The 5 ft 10 in point guard then starred at Arizona from 1999 to 2003. His team finished second place in the 2001 NCAA Men's Division I Basketball Tournament, losing to Duke University. As a senior in 2003, Gardner was named an Associated Press Second Team All-American after averaging 14.8 points and 4.9 assists per game. His college jersey number was retired by the University of Arizona in 2005.

Gardner was not drafted by the NBA, but found success overseas. He played in Slovenia, Belgium, and Israel. For the season 2006/07 he moved to Germany, where he played first with Telekom Baskets Bonn and then three seasons with EWE Baskets Oldenburg. In his second year with Oldenburg he won the German championship. He was a 2× All-Star in Germany, appearing in the Basketball Bundesliga's All-Star Game in 2007, and starting for the Northern All-Star Team in the Basketball Bundesliga's All-Star Game in 2009. He was also named 2008/2009 regular season MVP of the German Basketball Bundesliga. For the season he averaged 13.7 points 4.0 assists and 3.0 rebounds on shooting 40.8% from the field 37.5% from three-point range and 82.9% from the line. He recorded a season high of 25 points against the Telekom Baskets Bonn. Gardner led his team to a 25–9 record finishing third in the regular season.

In 2011, Gardner joined the coaching staff of Loyola University Chicago. Gardner left Loyola to join Josh Pastner's staff at the University of Memphis in the summer of 2013.

After just one season with Memphis, Gardner was named the head coach at IUPUI.

On August 12, 2020, nearly a year after resigning from IUPUI, Gardner was named the head coach of the North Central High School boys basketball team, returning to the school where he played his high school career.

However, after just a year there, he accepted a player relations director at his alma mater, the University of Arizona.

== Head coaching record ==
Record table
Season	Team	Overall	Conference	Standing	Postseason
IUPUI (Summit League) (2014–2017)
2014–15	IUPUI	10–21	6–10	T–6th	
2015–16	IUPUI	13–19	9–7	4th	
2016–17	IUPUI	14–18	7–9	7th	
IUPUI (Horizon League) (2017–2019)
2017–18	IUPUI	11–19	8–10	T–5th	
2018–19	IUPUI	16–17	8–10	T–6th	CIT First Round
IUPUI:		64–93 (.408)	38–46 (.452)		
Total:		64–93 (.408)			
National champion Postseason invitational champion Conference regular season champion Conference regular season and conference tournament champion Division regular season champion Division regular season and conference tournament champion Conference tournament champion
