= 2009–10 Basketball Bundesliga =

- League: Basketball Bundesliga
- Sport: Basketball

Regular season
- Top seed: EWE Baskets Oldenburg
- Season MVP: (United States) Julius Jenkins
- Top scorer: (United States) Chris Copeland

Finals
- Champions: Brose Baskets
- Runners-up: Deutsche Bank Skyliners
- Finals MVP: (United States) Casey Jacobsen

Basketball Bundesliga seasons
- ← 2008–09 2010–11 →

The Basketball Bundesliga 2009–10 was the 44th season of the Basketball Bundesliga. Ten days before the start of the season, Beko was presented as the new main sponsor of the BBL. The sponsorship agreement was made for a period of six years and included a rebranding of the league name to Beko BBL. After topsy-turvy playoffs that saw all of the top four teams in the regular season defeated in the first round, Brose Baskets Bamberg won the title after a 5-game final series against the Skyliners Frankfurt, who had defeated another higher seed in the semifinals. It was the 3rd title for Bamberg, who were also the only higher-seeded team to win a playoff series this season.

== Teams ==
Giants Nördlingen have decided to withdraw from the Basketball Bundesliga (BBL) and play in the Pro A this season. This resulted in a wild card to be issued by the BBL. The wild card was granted to LTi Giessen 46ers. LTi Giessen 46ers finished on a relegation position the previous season. Mitteldeutscher BC and Phoenix Hagen of the Pro A division have qualified by sportive means to play in Basketball Bundesliga 2009–10. Both received a licence for this season. Phoenix Hagen still has to meet a deadline by 30 July 2009 regarding their arena to maintain the licence, however the BBL expects them to meet the requirements. On 10 July 2009 Köln 99ers have filed for insolvency. On Monday 20 July 2009 he BBL intended to decide and announce its reaction to this insolvency. However, on Friday 17 July 2009 Köln 99ers declared to renounce their BBL licence. The created free space resulted in a second wild card being issued to Eisbären Bremerhaven. Eisbären Bremerhaven finished last in the previous season and originally were to be relegated.

BBL 2009–10 – Club Locations

Team	City/Area	Arena	Arena Capacity	08–09 Ranking
Brose Baskets	Bamberg	Jako-Arena	6800	7th / PO
ALBA Berlin	Berlin	O_{2} World	14500	1st / PO / cup winner
Telekom Baskets Bonn	Bonn	Telekom Dome	6000	4th / PO
New Yorker Phantoms Braunschweig	Braunschweig	Volkswagen Halle Braunschweig	6800	13th
Eisbären Bremerhaven	Bremerhaven	Stadthalle Bremerhaven	4200	18th / Rel / wild card
Giants Düsseldorf	Düsseldorf	Burg-Wächter Castello	3670	12th
Deutsche Bank Skyliners	Frankfurt	Ballsporthalle Frankfurt	5002	6th / PO
LTi Giessen 46ers	Gießen	Sporthalle Gießen-Ost	4003	17th / Rel / wild card
BG Göttingen	Göttingen	Lokhalle Göttingen	3474	2nd / PO
Phoenix Hagen	Hagen	Phoenix-Halle	3013	Pro A: 2nd / promotion
EnBW Ludwigsburg	Ludwigsburg	Arena Ludwigsburg	5300	11th
EWE Baskets Oldenburg	Oldenburg	EWE-Arena	3148	3rd / PO / champion
Paderborn Baskets	Paderborn	Sportzentrum Maspernplatz	3014	8th / PO
Artland Dragons	Quakenbrück	Artland-Arena	3000	9th
TBB Trier	Trier	Arena Trier	5900	10th
Walter Tigers Tübingen	Tübingen	Paul Horn-Arena	3132	14th
Ratiopharm Ulm	Ulm	Kuhberghalle	3000	5th / PO
Mitteldeutscher BC	Weißenfels	Stadthalle Weißenfels	3000	Pro A: 1st / promotion

PO: Playoff; Rel: Relegation; Pro A: Division below BBL

== Main round standings ==
#	Team	Wins	Losses	Points	Points For:Against	Plus/Minus
1	EWE Baskets Oldenburg	25	9	59	2564:2292	+272
2	ALBA Berlin	25	9	59	2594:2280	+314
3	BG Göttingen	24	10	58	2786:2511	+275
4	Telekom Baskets Bonn	24	10	58	2561:2475	+86
5	Brose Baskets Bamberg	22	12	56	2660:2443	+217
6	Eisbären Bremerhaven	21	13	55	2755:2631	+124
7	Deutsche Bank SKYLINERS	21	13	55	2561:2467	+94
8	New Yorker Phantoms Braunschweig	19	15	53	2688:2629	+59
9	Artland Dragons	19	15	53	2693:2486	+207
10	Mitteldeutscher BC	18	16	52	2601:2599	+2
11	EnBW Ludwigsburg	17	17	51	2522:2554	-32
12	WALTER Tigers Tübingen	16	18	50	2645:2705	-60
13	ratiopharm Ulm	13	21	47	2662:2826	-164
14	LTi Giessen 46ers	10	24	44	2482:2675	-193
15	TBB Trier	10	24	44	2492:2730	-238
16	Phoenix Hagen	9	25	43	2470:2798	-328
17	Giants Düsseldorf	8	26	42	2399:2562	-163
18	webmoebel Baskets	5	29	39	2384:2856	-472

= Qualification for Playoffs
= Relegation to Pro A

== Playoffs ==
Quarterfinals
1	EWE Baskets Oldenburg	83	65	66	76	X
8	Phantoms Braunschweig	67	73	70	78	X
4	Telekom Baskets Bonn	78	71	82	X	X
5	Brose Baskets Bamberg	80	83	84	X	X
2	ALBA Berlin	71	63	87	58	X
7	Deutsche Bank Skyliners	76	76	76	69	X
3	BG Göttingen	91	72	83	83	78
6	Eisbären Bremerhaven	73	91	78	90	79

Semifinals
8	Phantoms Braunschweig	77	73	82	X	X
5	Brose Baskets Bamberg	86	82	94	X	X
7	Deutsche Bank Skyliners	58	84	79	69	56
6	Eisbären Bremerhaven	75	83	53	76	52

Finals
5	Brose Baskets Bamberg	63	77	97	56	72
7	Deutsche Bank Skyliners	65	68	52	69	70

== See also ==
- Basketball Bundesliga 2008–09
- Basketball Bundesliga 2010–11
- German champions
