= Baskets Oldenburg =

Professional basketball team in Oldenburg, Germany

EWE Baskets Oldenburg
- Leagues: BBL
- Founded: 2001; 25 years ago
- History: Oldenburger TB; 1954–2001; EWE Baskets Oldenburg; 2001–present
- Arena: Large EWE Arena (occasional games at the Small EWE Arena)
- Capacity: 6,250
- Location: Oldenburg, Germany
- Team colors: Gold, grey
- President: Hermann Schüller; Gerold Lange
- Head coach: Milenko Bogićević
- Affiliation: EWE Baskets Juniors
- Championships: 1 German Championship; 1 German Cup; 1 German Supercup
- Retired numbers: 4 (6, 8, 14, 23)
- Website: www.ewe-baskets.de
Home	Away

Baskets Oldenburg, known as EWE Baskets Oldenburg for sponsorship reasons, is a professional basketball club based in Oldenburg, Germany. The club plays in the Bundesliga. The club's name is derived from the team's main sponsor EWE AG, which is an electric utility company. The club's home arena is the Große EWE Arena.

== History ==
The EWE Baskets Oldenburg club's origins began in the year 1954, as the basketball department of the Oldenburger TB sports club. In the year 2001, the basketball department of Oldenburger TB formed a new separate club, called EWE Baskets Oldenburg. The Oldenburger TB team then started to function as the development team of EWE Baskets.

In the 2008–09 season, EWE Baskets Oldenburg achieved their greatest success, by winning the German League championship title. As German Champion, Oldenburg won the right to play in the EuroLeague, during the next season of 2009–10.

In 2015, they won the German Cup title, while being host to the Cup Final Four. In the Cup Semi-final, Oldenburg beat Bonn, by a score of 71–77, and in the Cup Final, the team was too strong for Bamberg, as they beat them by a score of 70–72.

== Arenas ==
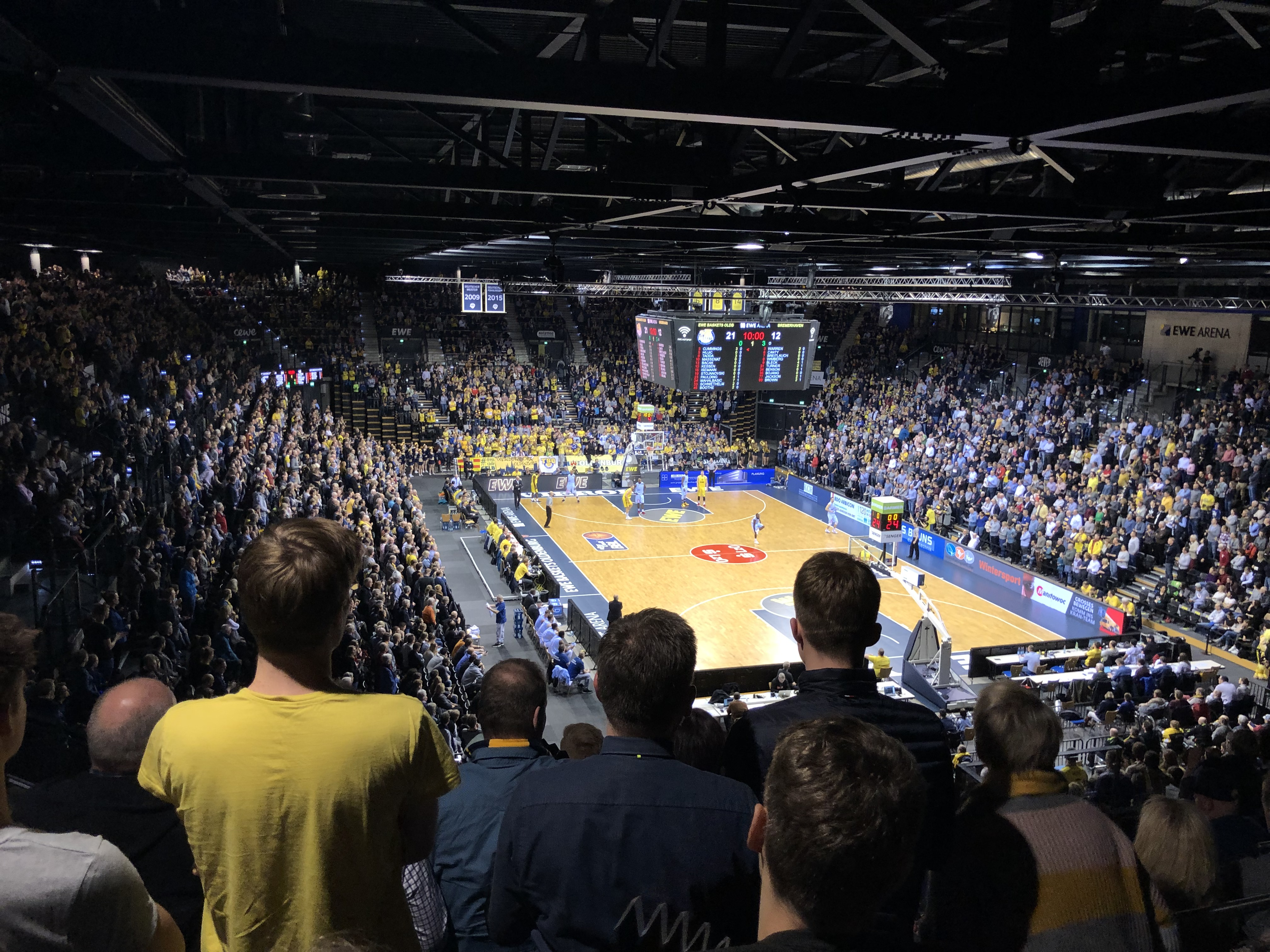
Game in the EWE Arena in January 2019

Oldenburg's home games take place at the 6,200 seat Große EWE Arena, which opened in 2013.

== Honors ==
Total titles:

=== Domestic competitions ===
- Basketball Bundesliga
  - Champions: 2008–09
    - Runners-up: 2012–13, 2016–17
- BBL-Pokal
  - Champions: 2015
- BBL Champions Cup
  - Champions: 2009

2. Basketball Bundesliga

- Champions: 1987, 1998, 2000

=== European competitions ===
- FIBA EuroChallenge
  - Third place: 2012–13

== Players ==
=== Retired numbers ===
EWE Baskets Oldenburg retired numbers
No.	Nat.	Player	Position	Tenure
6	(Germany)	Daniel Strauch	PF	2003–2010
8	(Czech Republic)	Pavel Bečka	C	1995–2004
8	(Czech Republic)	Pavel Bečka	C	2006
14	(United States)	Tyron McCoy	SG	2001–2007
23	(United States)	Rickey Paulding	SF	2007–2022

=== Current roster ===
EWE Baskets Oldenburg roster
Players
Coaches

Pos.	No.	Nat.	Name	Ht.	Age
G	0	(United States)	Darthard, Le'Tre	1.93 m (6 ft 4 in)	26 – 12 January 2000
C	2	(United States)	Wiggins, Demajeo	2.08 m (6 ft 10 in)	29 – 10 August 1997
G	3	(United States) (Germany)	Ensminger, Zachary	1.95 m (6 ft 5 in)	25 – 30 April 2001
G	5	(United States)	Roach, Jeremy	1.86 m (6 ft 1 in)	25 – 1 November 2001
SG	7	(Serbia)	Momirov, Stefan	1.98 m (6 ft 6 in)	26 – 18 December 1999
F	9	(United States)	Pope, Tylan	1.98 m (6 ft 6 in)	25 – 8 February 2001
G	10	(United States)	Johnson, Nate	1.93 m (6 ft 4 in)	28 – 25 April 1998
G/F	11	(Germany)	Tischler, Nicholas	2.00 m (6 ft 7 in)	26 – 18 August 2000
G	13	(United States)	Gilbreath, Ja'Qualyn	1.83 m (6 ft 0 in)	28 – 24 August 1998
C	15	(Germany)	Keßen, Marcel	2.06 m (6 ft 9 in)	29 – 2 January 1997
C	20	(Germany)	Harms, Joel	2.07 m (6 ft 9 in)	23 – 12 December 2002
F	21	(United States)	Hinrichs, Seth	1.99 m (6 ft 6 in)	33 – 24 March 1993
G	28	(Germany)	Helwig, Johann	1.95 m (6 ft 5 in)	20 – 6 May 2006
G	30	(Germany)	Ewert, Oré	1.83 m (6 ft 0 in)	20 – 17 February 2006
F	32	(Germany)	Klaric, Lazar	2.03 m (6 ft 8 in)	20 – 4 February 2006

Head coach

- (Serbia) Milenko Bogićević

Assistant coach(es)

- (Germany) Franjo Borchers
- (Argentina) Matias Suhurt
- (Serbia) Marko Ilic

Legend

- (C) Team captain
- (DP) Development player
- Injured

- Roster
Updated: September 15, 2026

=== Depth chart ===
Pos.	Starting 5	Bench 1	Bench 2
C	Demajeo Wiggins	Marcel Keßen	Joel Harms
PF	Seth Hinrichs	Tylan Pope	Lazar Klaric
SF	Nicholas Tischler	Stefan Momirov	Johann Helwig
SG	Zachary Ensminger	Nate Johnson	Le'Tre Darthard
PG	Jeremy Roach	Ja'Qualyn Gilbreath	Oré Ewert

=== Individual awards ===
- BBL Most Valuable Player
  - Jason Gardner – 2009
  - Will Cummings – 2019
- BBL Finals MVP
  - Rickey Paulding – 2009
- All-BBL First Team
  - Jason Gardner – 2008, 2009
  - Rickey Paulding – 2008, 2009, 2013, 2016
  - Brian Qvale – 2016
  - Chris Kramer – 2017
- All-BBL Second Team
  - Tyron McCoy – 2005
  - Je'Kel Foster – 2010
  - Adam Chubb – 2013
  - Julius Jenkins – 2014
  - Vaughn Duggins – 2016
  - Rickey Paulding – 2017
  - Brian Qvale – 2017

=== Notable players ===
Note: Flags indicate national team eligibility at FIBA-sanctioned events. Players may hold other non-FIBA nationalities not displayed.

Criteria

To appear in this section a player must have either:

- Set a club record or won an individual award while at the club
- Played at least one official international match for their national team at any time
- Played at least one official NBA match at any time.

- (Germany) Steven Hutchinson
- (Bosnia and Herzegovina) Elvir Ovčina
- (Cameroon) Ruben Boumtje-Boumtje
- (Czech Republic) Pavel Bečka
- (Dominican Republic) Felipe López
- (Latvia) Kristaps Valters
- (Australia) Aron Baynes
- (United States Virgin Islands) Carl Krauser
- (North Macedonia) Vojdan Stojanovski
- (Puerto Rico) Tai Odiase
- (United States) Josh Carter
- (United States) Terrel Castle
- (United States) Bill Edwards
- (United States) (Israel) D'or Fischer
- (United States) Je'Kel Foster
- (United States) Jason Gardner
- (United States) Anthony Grundy
- (United States) Dan Grunfeld
- (United States) (Israel) Max Heidegger
- (United States) Chris Kramer
- (United States) Scott Machado
- (United States) Tyron McCoy
- (United States) Rickey Paulding
- (United States) Desmond Penigar
- (United States) Doron Perkins
- (United States) Bobby Brown
- (United States) Julius Jenkins

== Season by season ==
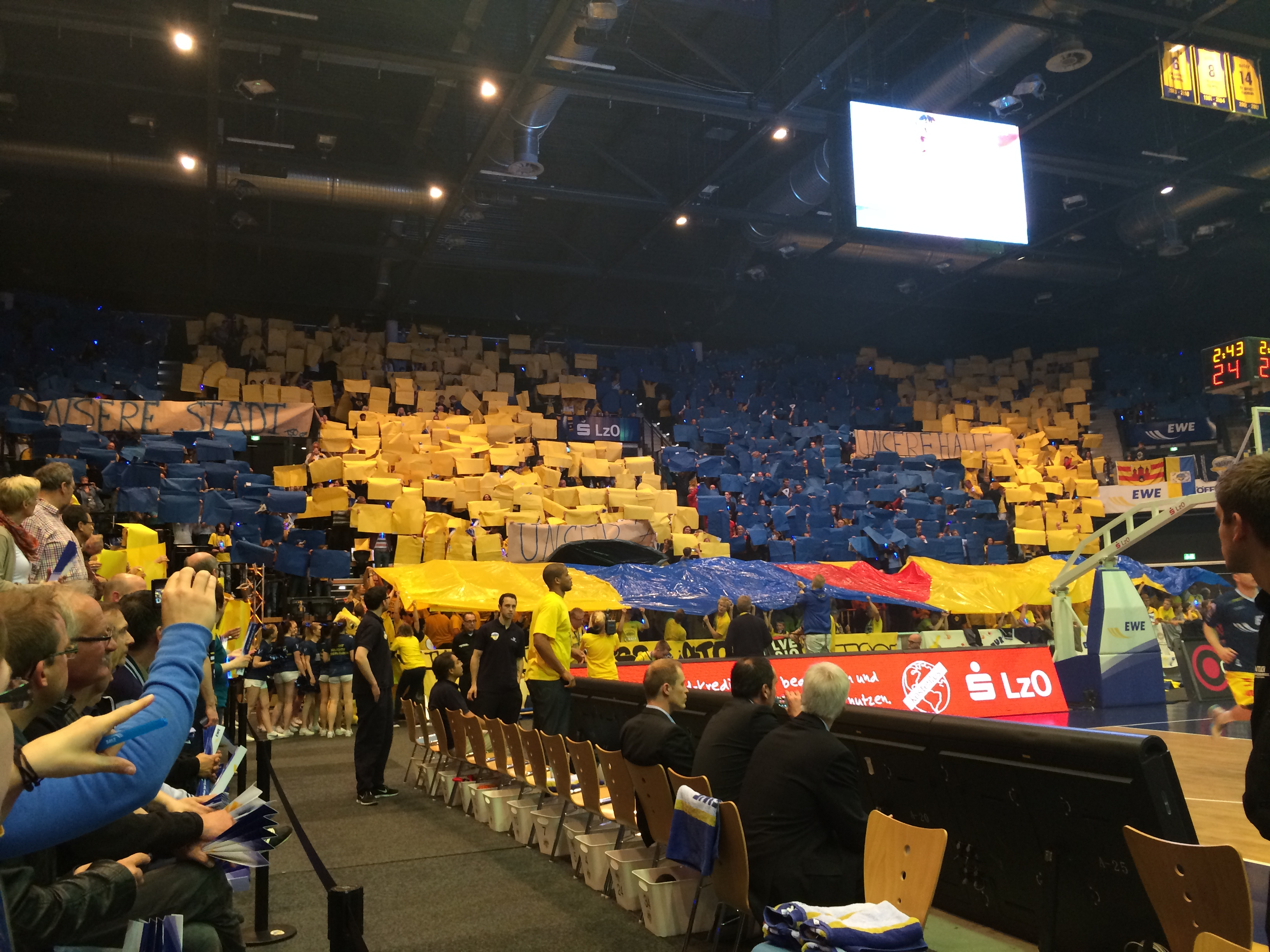
Fans of Oldenburg during a Playoff game in the 2013–14 season

Season	Tier	League	Pos.	German Cup	European competitions		
2001–02	1	Bundesliga	12th	Runner-up			
2002–03	1	Bundesliga	6th				
2003–04	1	Bundesliga	5th				
2004–05	1	Bundesliga	7th				
2005–06	1	Bundesliga	8th				
2006–07	1	Bundesliga	9th				
2007–08	1	Bundesliga	3rd				
2008–09	1	Bundesliga	1st		3 EuroChallenge	T16	10–1–5
2009–10	1	Bundesliga	5th	Quarter-finalist	1 Euroleague	RS	1–9
2010–11	1	Bundesliga	6th	Quarter-finalist	2 Eurocup	RS	1–5
2011–12	1	Bundesliga	10th	Quarter-finalist	3 EuroChallenge	T16	9–3
2012–13	1	Bundesliga	2nd	Quarter-finalist	3 EuroChallenge	3rd	14–3
2013–14	1	Bundesliga	3rd	Quarter-finalist	1 Euroleague	QR2	1–1
2013–14	1	Bundesliga	3rd	Quarter-finalist	2 Eurocup	RS	5–5
2014–15	1	Bundesliga	7th	Champion	2 Eurocup	RS	4–6
2015–16	1	Bundesliga	5th	Quarter-finalist	2 Eurocup	EF	8–8
2016–17	1	Bundesliga	2nd		Champions League	EF	11–1–6
2017–18	1	Bundesliga	7th		Champions League	R16	10–6
2018–19	1	Bundesliga	3rd	Round of 16			
2019–20	1	Bundesliga	4th	Runner-up	2 EuroCup	T16	8–8
2020–21	1	Bundesliga	5th	Group stage			
2021–22	1	Bundesliga	11th	Round of 16	Champions League	RS	1–5
2022–23	1	Bundesliga	6th	Runner-up			
2023–24	1	Bundesliga	10th	Round of 16	Champions League	RS	2–4
2024–25	1	Bundesliga	9th	Round of 16			
2025–26	1	Bundesliga	11th	Semifinalist			
2026–27	1	Bundesliga		Round of 16			

== Colors and logos ==
The traditional colors of the EWE Baskets Oldenburg basketball club are yellow and blue. From 2009 to 2018, the team adopted a slightly reworked logo, this time with a white background and which again featured an eagle. In 2018, the club adopted its massively modernized current logo, now round and with a different shade of blue. The eagle however is still on it.

Logo used from 2004 to 2009

Logo used from 2018 until today
