= 2010–11 Basketball Bundesliga =

- League: Basketball Bundesliga
- Sport: Basketball

Regular season
- Top seed: Brose Baskets
- Season MVP: (United States) DaShaun Wood
- Top scorer: (United States) DaShaun Wood

Finals
- Champions: Brose Baskets
- Runners-up: ALBA Berlin
- Finals MVP: (United States) Kyle Hines

Basketball Bundesliga seasons
- ← 2009–10 2011–12 →

The Basketball Bundesliga 2010–11 was the 45th season of the Basketball Bundesliga (BBL). Prior to the start of the season, a new logo for the league was presented, combined with the motto "Spürst Du das Dribbeln?" ("Do you feel the dribbling?"). The regular season ran from October 1, 2010 through April 23, 2011, and the first round of the playoffs began begin on April 30 and the last match played on June 18.

== Teams ==
All teams of the season 2009–10, which had qualified for the season 2010–11 by sportive means, have been granted a licence for the season 2010–11. BBC Bayreuth and Cuxhaven BasCats of the Pro A division have qualified by sportive means to play in Basketball Bundesliga 2010–11. BBC Bayreuth have received a licence for the BBL. However Cuxhaven BasCats waived their rights for promotion, which resulted in a free slot. The clubs of the BBL decided unanimously to grant a wildcard for this slot to GIANTS Düsseldorf. GIANTS Düsseldorf finished on a relegation position (17th) in the previous season and, because the financial requirements tied to the wildcard could be met, the club has been prevented from relegation.

BBL 2010–11 – Club Locations

Team	City/Area	Arena	Arena Capacity	09–10 Ranking
Brose Baskets	Bamberg	Jako-Arena	6800	5th / PO / champion
BBC Bayreuth	Bayreuth	Oberfrankenhalle	4000	Pro A: 1st / promotion
ALBA Berlin	Berlin	O_{2} World	14500	2nd / PO
Telekom Baskets Bonn	Bonn	Telekom Dome	6000	4th / PO
New Yorker Phantoms Braunschweig	Braunschweig	Volkswagen Halle	6800	8th / PO
Eisbären Bremerhaven	Bremerhaven	Stadthalle Bremerhaven	4200	6th / PO
Giants Düsseldorf	Düsseldorf	Burg-Wächter Castello	3670	17th / Rel / wild card
Deutsche Bank Skyliners	Frankfurt	Ballsporthalle Frankfurt	5002	7th / PO
LTi Giessen 46ers	Gießen	Sporthalle Gießen-Ost	4003	14th
BG Göttingen	Göttingen	Lokhalle Göttingen	3474	3rd / PO
Phoenix Hagen	Hagen	Ischelandhalle	3000+x	16th
EnBW Ludwigsburg	Ludwigsburg	Arena Ludwigsburg	5300	11th
EWE Baskets Oldenburg	Oldenburg	Kleine EWE Arena	3148	1st / PO
Artland Dragons	Quakenbrück	Artland-Arena	3000	9th
TBB Trier	Trier	Arena Trier	5900	15th
Walter Tigers Tübingen	Tübingen	Paul Horn-Arena	3132	12th
Ratiopharm Ulm	Ulm	Kuhberghalle	3000	13th
Mitteldeutscher BC	Weißenfels	Stadthalle Weißenfels	3000	10th

PO: Playoff; Rel: Relegation; Pro A: Division below BBL; italic type: preliminary

== Main round standings ==
#	Team	Wins	Losses	Points	Points For:Against	Plus/Minus
1	Brose Baskets	32	2	64:4	2786:2213	+573
2	Deutsche Bank Skyliners	26	8	52:16	2629:2365	+264
3	ALBA Berlin	24	10	48:20	2802:2526	+276
4	Artland Dragons	23	11	46:22	2736:2484	+252
5	New Yorker Phantoms Braunschweig	20	14	40:28	2647:2563	+84
6	EWE Baskets Oldenburg	20	14	40:28	2603:2599	+4
7	BG Göttingen	19	15	38:30	2514:2403	+111
8	Eisbären Bremerhaven	18	16	36:32	2670:2698	-28
9	EnBW Ludwigsburg	18	16	36:32	2699:2769	-70
10	TBB Trier	17	17	34:34	2380:2383	-3
11	Phoenix Hagen	15	19	30:38	2904:2959	-55
12	WALTER Tigers Tübingen	15	19	30:38	2600:2698	-98
13	Telekom Baskets Bonn	14	20	28:40	2527:2602	-75
14	Ratiopharm Ulm	12	22	24:44	2755:2806	-51
15	LTi Giessen 46ers	9	25	18:50	2368:2657	-289
16	BBC Bayreuth	9	25	18:50	2528:2746	-218
17	Mitteldeutscher BC	8	26	16:52	2338:2612	-274
18	Giants Düsseldorf	7	27	14:54	2249:2652	-403

Mitteldeutscher BC and Giants Düsseldorf will be relegated to the Pro A league for the 2011–12 season.

= Qualification for Playoffs
= Relegation to Pro A

== Playoffs ==
Quarterfinals
1	Brose Baskets	91	88	86	X	X
8	Eisbären Bremerhaven	80	84	58	X	X
4	Artland Dragons	90	81	64	77	99
5	Phantoms Braunschweig	61	94	79	75	69
2	Deutsche Bank Skyliners	77	76	82	X	X
7	BG Göttingen	58	67	59	X	X
3	ALBA Berlin	95	80	86	79	99
6	EWE Baskets Oldenburg	68	77	99	80	68

Semifinals
1	Brose Baskets	85	72	84	59	83
4	Artland Dragons	73	86	61	75	55
2	Deutsche Bank Skyliners	80	80	52	83	69
3	ALBA Berlin	81	72	68	74	87

Finals
1	Brose Baskets	90	71	90	67	72
3	ALBA Berlin	76	80	74	87	65

== See also ==
- German champions
