= 2016 BBL-Pokal =

49th season of the German Basketball Cup

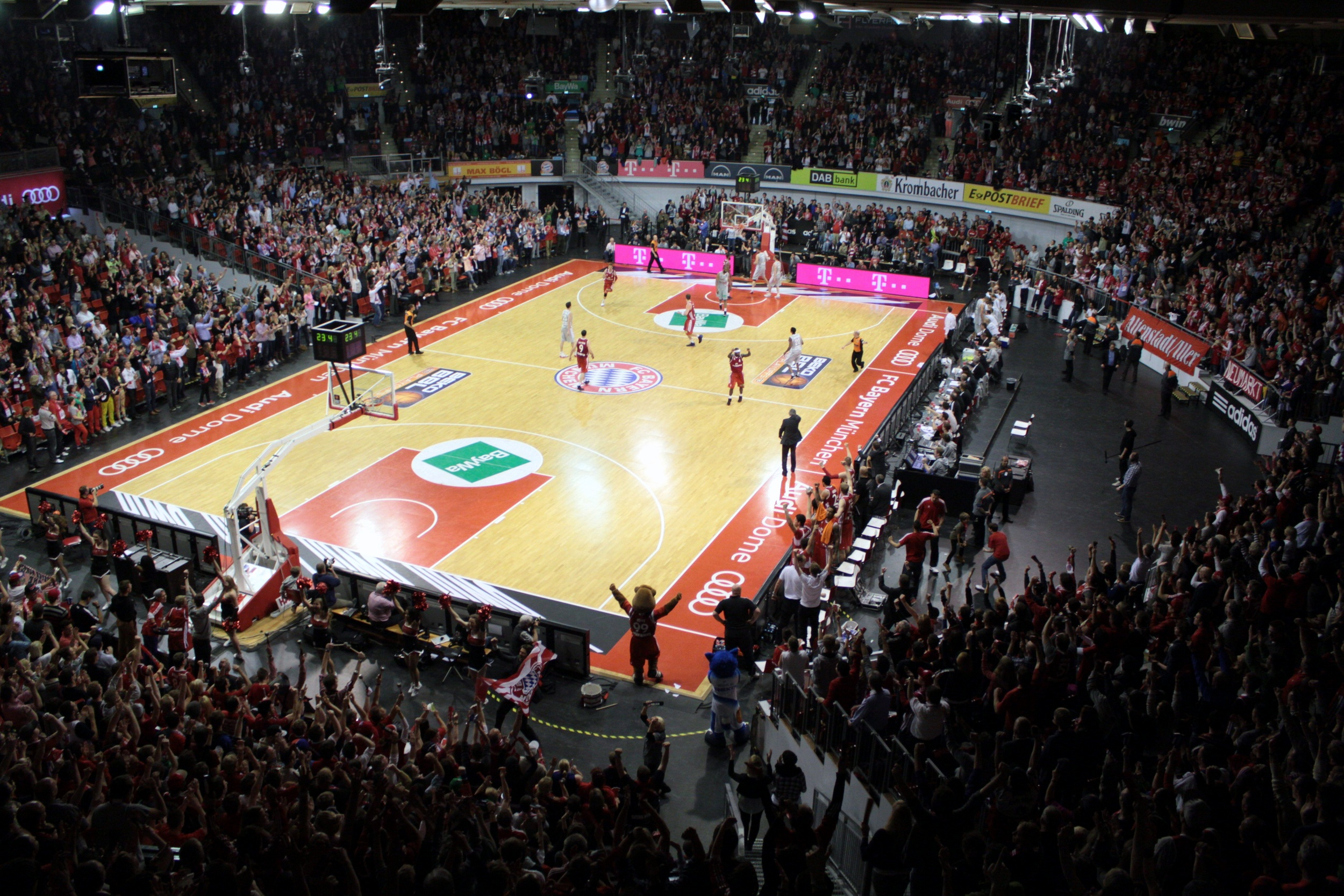
- The Audi Dome in Munich was the venue for the Final Four
- Season: 2016
- Dates: 20–21 February
- Games played: 6
- Teams: 7

Finals
- Champions: Alba Berlin (9th title)
- Runners-up: Bayern Munich

The 2016 BBL-Pokal was the 49th season of the German Basketball Cup. The Final Four was held in Munich, which gained Bayern Munich automatic qualification. The other six participating teams were selected through the standings in the 2015–16 Basketball Bundesliga.

The third place game was not played due to wet spots on the court.

== Participants ==
The following six teams qualified based on their standings in first half of the 2015–16 BBL.

1. Alba Berlin
2. Brose Baskets
3. Skyliners Frankfurt
4. MHP Riesen Ludwigsburg
5. EWE Baskets Oldenburg
6. s.Oliver Baskets

Bayern Munich was qualified as host team of the Final Four.

== Bracket ==
Qualifying round
24 January
MHP Riesen Ludwigsburg	58
Brose Baskets	61
23 January
Alba Berlin	102
s.Oliver Baskets	73
24 January
Fraport Skyliners	80
EWE Baskets Oldenburg	68

Semifinals
20 February
Brose Baskets	79
Bayern Munich	86
20 February
Alba Berlin	79
Fraport Skyliners	76

Final
21 February
Bayern Munich	65
Alba Berlin	67

=== Qualifying round ===
23 January 2016
18:30

Boxscore

Alba Berlin	102–73	s.Oliver Baskets
Scoring by quarter: 26–18, 30–18, 22–12, 24–25
Pts: Elmedin Kikanović 16; Rebs: Elmedin Kikanović 7 Asts: Will Cherry 9		Pts: three players 10; Rebs: Cameron Long 4 Asts: Dru Joyce 4

Mercedes-Benz Arena, Berlin
Attendance: 6,123
Referees: Martin Matip, Oliver Krause, Clemens Fritz

24 January 2016
17:00

Boxscore

MHP Riesen Ludwigsburg	58–71	Brose Baskets
Scoring by quarter: 11–20, 25–14, 14–20, 8–17
Pts: Kerron Johnson 15; Rebs: Brockman, O'Neale 8 Asts: Kerron Johnson 3		Pts: Nicolo Melli 17; Rebs: Daniel Theis 8 Asts: Jānis Strēlnieks 4

Arena Ludwigsburg, Ludwigsburg
Attendance: 2,987
Referees: Robert Lottermoser, Benjamin Barth, Nesa Kovačević

24 January 2016
17:00

Boxscore

Skyliners Frankfurt	80–68	EWE Baskets Oldenburg
Scoring by quarter: 23–19, 21–24, 23–13, 13–12
Pts: Johannes Voigtmann 14; Rebs: Quantez Robertson 7 Asts: Jordan Theodore 8		Pts: Vaughn Duggins 17; Rebs: Brian Qvale 12; Asts: Vaughn Duggins 6

Fraport Arena, Frankfurt
Attendance: 2,850
Referees: Moritz Reiter, Anne Panther, Konstantin Simonow

=== Semifinals ===
20 February 2016
16:00

Boxscore

Brose Baskets	79–86	Bayern Munich
Scoring by quarter: 20–17, 19–21, 18–18, 22–30
Pts: Nikos Zisis 15; Rebs: Brad Wanamaker 5 Asts: Brad Wanamaker 5		Pts: Savanović, Thompson 16; Rebs: three players 5 Asts: Justin Cobbs 6

Audi Dome, Munich
Attendance: 6,500
Referees: Robert Lottermoser, Oliver Krause, Konstantin Simonow

20 February 2016
19:00

Boxscore

Alba Berlin	79–76	Fraport Skyliners
Scoring by quarter: 10–17, 31–18, 21–21, 17–20
Pts: Dragan Milosavljević 21; Rebs: Dragan Milosavljević 9 Asts: Jordan Taylor 8		Pts: Jordan Theodore 22; Rebs: Quantez Robertson 9 Asts: Jordan Theodore 4

Audi Dome, Munich
Attendance: 6,500
Referees: Martin Matip, Benjamin Barth, Anne Panther

=== Final ===
Dragan Milosavljevic hit a game-winning floater with 5.6 seconds to go in the game, to lead Alba Berlin to its 9th Cup title.

21 February 2016
14:45

Boxscore

Bayern Munich	65–67	Alba Berlin
Scoring by quarter: 11–13, 23–12, 9–18, 22–24
Pts: Bryce Taylor 14; Rebs: John Bryant 6 Asts: Cobbs, Renfroe 6		Pts: Elmedin Kikanović 19; Rebs: Dragan Milosavljević 8 Asts: Jordan Taylor 4

Audi Dome, Munich
Attendance: 6,500
Referees: Robert Lottermoser, Martin Matip, Anne Panther

Bayern Munich	Alba Berlin
