= Artland Dragons =

- Leagues: ProA
- Founded: 1955; 71 years ago
- History: QTSV Quakenbrück (1955–2003); Artland Dragons (2003–present)
- Arena: Artland-Arena
- Capacity: 3,000
- Location: Quakenbrück, Germany
- Team colors: White, black, green and red
- Main sponsor: INDULOR Chemie
- General manager: Thomas Fengler
- Team manager: Agnés Welmann
- Head coach: Hendrik Gruhn
- Assistant: Chad Prewitt
- Team captain: Buzz Anthony
- Championships: 1 2. Basketball Bundesliga North (2003); 1 German Cup (2008)
- Retired numbers: 2 (4, 14)
- Website: artland-dragons.de
Home	Away	Third

Artland Dragons, formerly known as QTSV Quakenbrück is a professional basketball club based in Quakenbrück in the collective municipality Artland, in the district Osnabrück, in Lower Saxony, Germany. The club's home arena is the Artland Arena, which has a capacity of 3,000 spectators. Between 2003 and 2015 the club played in the Basketball Bundesliga, the top tier of basketball in Germany, and participated in several European competitions. On May 3, 2015, the club announced that it would fold. Ultimately, the management decided to continue operations starting in the third tier, the ProB. In 2018, the Dragons were promoted to the second tier, the ProA, where they have played since.

== History ==
Basketball has a long tradition in Quakenbrück. It was first played in the Artland-Gymnasium school. The basketball section of the sports club QTSV Quakenbrück was established in 1955. In the 1970s, the first men's team got their first achievement, by being promoted to the second German League, where they stayed for three seasons.

After a long time without great success, Günter 'Ice' Kollmann, former German basketball player and junior national team member, supported the QTSV team as a main sponsor. By continuous work on the youth education in the 1980s, the team had major successes in the 1990s. In 1994, the team was promoted to the second regional league, followed by promotion to the first regional league one season later, and promotion to the second national league another season later. In 2003, the promotion to the highest national league was made and the name of the club changed officially to Artland Dragons from QTSV Quakenbrück. QTSV then became a smaller partner club in a lower regional league.

In the seasons 1995–96 and 2002–03, the team was unbeaten in its league.

Starting from the 2003–04 season, the Artland Dragons played in the first tier BBL a long time. In the 2006–07 season, the team managed to end 2nd in the regular season and played in the BBL Finals. The team lost 3–1 to first seeded Brose Baskets Bamberg. Starting from the 2007–08 season, the team also played in European competitions for 8 straight years.

In May 2015, the club unexpectedly announced that it would dissolve the professional basketball club. The reasons for the closure included that the Dragons could not keep up with the growing budgets of other BBL teams, due to the club's small arena and lack of big sponsors. Eventually, the team decided to move back to the third division ProB.

Vincent Macaulay

In June 2024, British head coach Vincent Macaulay took over the reins for the Artland Dragons. He started out with a ProA winning streak of 4 games. After going to 4-5 record, he was released. The decision to release Macaulay faced severe criticism as, under new leadership, the Dragons lost 12 games in a row.

Dragons huddle in October 2024.

== Logos ==
The original club logo

== Trophies ==
2. Basketball Bundesliga North

- Winners (1): 2003

German Bundesliga

  - Runners-up (1): 2007

German Cup

- Winners (1): 2008
  - Runners-up (1): 2007

== Season by season ==
Season	Tier	League	Pos.	German Cup	European competitions	
2000–01	2	2. BBL	2nd	-	-	
2001–02	2	2. BBL	3rd	-	-	
2002–03	2	2. BBL	1st	-	-	
2003–04	1	Bundesliga	9th	-	-	
2004–05	1	Bundesliga	6th	-	-	
2005–06	1	Bundesliga	5th	Fourth position	-	
2006–07	1	Bundesliga	2nd	Runner-up	-	
2007–08	1	Bundesliga	5th	Champion	2 ULEB Cup	RS
2008–09	1	Bundesliga	9th	-	2 Eurocup	RS
2009–10	1	Bundesliga	9th	-	3 EuroChallenge	RS
2010–11	1	Bundesliga	4th	Third position	3 EuroChallenge	QR
2011–12	1	Bundesliga	3rd	Quarterfinalist	3 EuroChallenge	QF
2012–13	1	Bundesliga	6th	Fourth position	2 Eurocup	RS
2013–14	1	Bundesliga	4th	Quarterfinalist	2 Eurocup	RS
2014–15	1	Bundesliga	11th (Note: Resigned its position in the Bundesliga.)	-	2 Eurocup	RS
2015–16	3	ProB	6th	-	-	
2016–17	3	ProB	2nd	-	-	
2017–18	3	ProB	5th	-	-	
2018–19	2	ProA	11th	-	-	
2019–20	2	ProA	14th	-	-	
2020–21	2	ProA	8th	-	-	
2021–22	2	ProA	15th	-	-	
2022–23	2	ProA	6th	-	-	
2023–24	2	ProA	14th	First round	-	
2024–25	2	ProA	17th	-	-	
2025–26	2	ProA	7th	-	-	
2026–27	2	ProA	TBD	-	-	

== Players ==
=== Current roster ===
Note: Flags indicate national team eligibility at FIBA-sanctioned events. Players may hold other non-FIBA nationalities not displayed.

Artland Dragons roster
Players
Coaches

Pos.	No.	Nat.	Name	Ht.	Age
PG	2	(Germany)	Kruthaup, Epke	1.85 m (6 ft 1 in)	18 – 7 September 2008
PG	3	(Germany) (Croatia)	Dolić, Dominik	1.94 m (6 ft 4 in)	20 – 30 October 2006
SG	5	(Netherlands)	Bernardina, Djairo	1.86 m (6 ft 1 in)	19 – 12 June 2007
SG	6	(Germany) (United States)	Teichmann, Grant	1.91 m (6 ft 3 in)	30 – 6 August 1996
PF	7	(Germany)	Bruce, Dejan	2.07 m (6 ft 9 in)	24 – 2 September 2002
SG	8	(Germany)	Grüß, Moritz	1.96 m (6 ft 5 in)	18 – 30 September 2008
PG	9	(United States)	Anthony, Buzz (C)	1.80 m (5 ft 11 in)	28 – 4 September 1998
PF/C	10	(Lithuania) (Germany)	Kazakevicius, Danas	2.05 m (6 ft 9 in)	21 – 23 May 2005
SF	12	(Germany)	Ndi, Elijah	1.95 m (6 ft 5 in)	22 – 2 September 2004
C	13	(Germany)	Braun, Eliah	2.04 m (6 ft 8 in)	18 – 12 December 2007
SF	15	(Germany)	Trettin, Linus	2.04 m (6 ft 8 in)	21 – 16 May 2005
C	21	(Germany) (Nigeria)	Ozike, Emanuel	2.04 m (6 ft 8 in)	23 – 22 November 2002
PF	32	(United States)	Bohannon, Naz	1.98 m (6 ft 6 in)	27 – 22 January 1999
F	33	(Canada)	Fuller, Jamal	1.95 m (6 ft 5 in)	25 – 21 September 2001
PG	55	(Germany) (Benin)	Hounnou, Ralph	1.92 m (6 ft 4 in)	24 – 16 January 2002
SG	71	(Denmark)	Klussmann, Jonathan	1.90 m (6 ft 3 in)	24 – 6 October 2002

Head coach

- (Germany) Hendrik Gruhn

Assistant coach(es)

- (United States) Chad Prewitt

Athletic trainer(s)

- (Germany) Pavao Blazevic

Physician(s)

- (Germany) Dr. Heinz Gerd Grotepaß
- (Germany) Dr. Stephanie Götting

Physiotherapist(s)

- (Germany) Jannes Brundiers
- (Germany) Matthias Strotmann

Team manager

- (Germany) Agnés Weltmann
- (United States) Brandon Thomas (Sporting director)

Legend

- (C) Team captain
- Injured

- Roster
Updated: August 19, 2026

=== Retired numbers ===
Artland Dragons retired numbers
No	Nat.	Player	Position	Tenure	Ceremony date
4	(Germany)	Thorben Döding	PG	2015–2025	April 19, 2025
14	(United States)	Brandon Thomas	SG/SF/G/F; Sporting Director; Coach	2011–2012; 2013–2015; 2023–2025; 2025–present	April 19, 2025

=== Notable players ===
Note: Flags indicate national team eligibility at FIBA-sanctioned events. Players may hold other non-FIBA nationalities not displayed.

Criteria

To appear in this section a player must have either:

- Set a club record or won an individual award while at the club
- Played at least one official international match for their national team at any time
- Played at least one official NBA match at any time.

- (Germany) Isaiah Hartenstein
- (Germany) Jan Jagla
- (Germany) Andrej Mangold
- (Germany) Bastian Doreth
- (Germany) Robert Oehle
- (Austria) Timo Lanmüller
- (Azerbaijan) Nik Caner-Medley
- (Bulgaria) E.J. Rowland
- (Czech Republic) Adam Pecháček
- (Montenegro) Tyrese Rice
- (Cyprus) Anthony King
- (Syria) Amir Hinton
- (Puerto Rico) Filiberto Rivera
- (United States) Chris Fleming
- (United States) John Goldsberry
- (United States) MarQuez Haynes
- (United States) Demond Mallet
- (United States) Leon Rodgers
- (United States) Tommy Smith
- (United States) Terrance Thomas
- (United States) Adam Hess
- (United States) Michael-Hakim Jordan
- (United States) David Holston
- (United States) Anthony Hilliard
- (United States) Ben Burnham

Other notable former players
Nat.	Name	current team
(Germany)	Thorben Döding	UBC Münster
(Germany)	Max Rockmann	retired
(Germany)	Florian Hartenstein	retired
(Germany)	Yasin Kolo	
(United States)	Darius Hall	retired
(United States)	Chad Prewitt	retired
(United States)	Bryan Bailey	retired
(United States)	LaMont McIntosh	retired
(United States)	Bryce Taylor	retired
(United States)	Brandon Thomas	TSV Quakenbrück
(United States)	Chase Griffin	retired
(United States)	De’Vondre Perry	Kazma SC

== Partner & youth teams ==
The Partner club of the Artland Dragons is the local basketball club "TSV Quakenbrück ("QTSV"), with a men's team playing in the regional league, and a women's team playing in the fifth German women's league. There are also a variety of other teams (youth and adults, also wheelchair basketball). The Male youth teams of the Artland Dragons are the "Young Rasta Dragons" (formerly "Young Dragons"), which plays in the NBBL and the JBBL, the German youth team leagues (Nachwuchs Basketball Bundesliga) and (Jugend Basketball Bundesliga). And the Female team is the Junior Team Osnabrück/Artland (formerly Junior Panthers Osnabrück), which plays in the WNBL the German youth team league (Weibliche Nachwuchs Basketball Bundesliga).

For their Male youth Teams the Artland Dragons work together with the SC Rasta Vechta. And for the Female youth Team the Artland Dragons work together with the GiroLive Panthers Osnabrück and the Osnabrücker SC.

== Cheerleader squad and team mascot ==
The cheerleader squad is called "The Flames". It is trained by Steffie Bäker. The team mascot is a dragon called, "Tobi der Drache" (Tobi the Dragon).
