= 2026 BBL Playoffs =

German basketball postseason

Tournament details
- Country: Germany
- Dates: 12 May – 21 June
- Teams: 10

Final positions
- Champions: Alba Berlin
- Runners-up: Bayern Munich
- Semifinalists: Telekom Baskets Bonn; Bamberg Baskets

Awards
- Finals MVP: Justin Bean

The 2026 BBL Playoffs was the concluding postseason of the 2025–26 Basketball Bundesliga season. The playoffs started on 12 May and ended on 21 June 2026.

The format saw a change from a 1-1-1-1-1 format to a 2-2-1 format, with the home team hosting the first two and the last game.

== Playoff qualifying ==
Seed	Team	Record	Clinched			
Seed	Team	Record	Play-in berth	Playoff berth	Seeded team	Top seed
1	Bayern Munich	29–5	13 April	14 April	14 April	1 May
2	Alba Berlin	24–10	17 April	21 April	22 April	
3	Bamberg Baskets	24–10	26 April	27 April	27 April	
4	Telekom Baskets Bonn	21–13	26 April	1 May	8 May	
5	Fitness First Würzburg Baskets	20–14	3 May	7 May		
6	Ratiopharm Ulm	19–15	26 April	9 May		
†	Rasta Vechta	17–17	10 May			
†	Vet-Concept Gladiators Trier	17–17	10 May			
†	Rostock Seawolves	17–17	10 May			
†	MHP Riesen Ludwigsburg	17–17	10 May			

† Teams ranked 7 through 10 will participate in the play-in tournament to determine seeds 7 and 8.

== Play-in tournament ==
Only the top six seeds advanced directly to the playoffs, while the next four seeds participated in a play-in tournament. The seventh place team hosted the eighth place team in the double-chance round needing to win one game to advance, with the winner clinching the seventh seed in the playoffs. The ninth place team hosted the tenth place team in the elimination round requiring two wins to advance, with the loser being eliminated from the competition. The loser in the double-chance round hosted the elimination-round game-winner, with the winner clinching the eighth seed and the loser being eliminated. The games were played on 11 and 13 May 2025.

Play-in games
7	Rasta Vechta	111
8	Vet-Concept Gladiators Trier	83
9	Rostock Seawolves	91
10	MHP Riesen Ludwigsburg	71

No. 8 seed game
8	Vet-Concept Gladiators Trier	76
9	Rostock Seawolves	69

Final seeds
Rasta Vechta	No. 7 seed
Vet-Concept Gladiators Trier	No. 8 seed

Bold Game winner

=== Seed 9 vs Seed 10 ===
12 May 2026
18:30

Boxscore

Rostock Seawolves	91–71	MHP Riesen Ludwigsburg
Scoring by quarter: 21−17, 21−21, 25−9, 24−24
Pts: D'Shawn Schwartz 24; Rebs: three players 6 Asts: TJ Crockett 6		Pts: Stef Smith 12; Rebs: Yorman Polas Bartolo 9 Asts: Skuja, Smith 6

Stadthalle Rostock, Rostock
Attendance: 2,859
Referees: Martin Matip, Christof Madinger, Benjamin Barth

=== Seed 7 vs Seed 8 ===
12 May 2026
20:30

Boxscore

Rasta Vechta	111–83	Vet-Concept Gladiators Trier
Scoring by quarter: 18−22, 29−19, 29−26, 35−16
Pts: Malik Parsons 24; Rebs: TJ Bamba 5 Asts: Alonzo Verge Jr. 10		Pts: Nolan Adekunle 15; Rebs: Urald King 7 Asts: Steven Ashworth 7

Rasta Dome, Vechta
Attendance: 2,946
Referees: Anne Panther, Gentian Cici, Christian Theis

=== Loser Game 1 vs Winner Game 2 ===
14 May 2026
18:30

Boxscore

Vet-Concept Gladiators Trier	76–69	Rostock Seawolves
Scoring by quarter: 24–24, 23–19, 15–17, 14–9
Pts: Ashworth, Roland 14; Rebs: Marco Hollersbacher 9 Asts: Steven Ashworth 6		Pts: TJ Crockett 22; Rebs: Owen Klassen 8 Asts: Elias Baggette 4

SWT-Arena, Trier
Attendance: 5,400
Referees: Robert Lottermoser, Carsten Straube, Kristaps Konstantinovs

== Bracket ==
The rounds will be played in a best-of-five format.

Quarterfinals
1	Bayern Munich	3
8	Vet-Concept Gladiators Trier	0
4	Telekom Baskets Bonn	3
5	Fitness First Würzburg Baskets	2
2	Alba Berlin	3
7	Rasta Vechta	2
3	Bamberg Baskets	3
6	Ratiopharm Ulm	0

Semifinals
1	Bayern Munich	3
4	Telekom Baskets Bonn	0
2	Alba Berlin	3
3	Bamberg Baskets	2

Finals
1	Bayern Munich	2
2	Alba Berlin	3

== Quarterfinals ==
The quarterfinals were held from 16 to 27 May 2026 in a best-of-five format.

=== Bayern Munich vs Gladiators Trier ===
17 May 2026
16:30

Boxscore

Bayern Munich	101–80	Vet-Concept Gladiators Trier
Scoring by quarter: 20–26, 28–18, 24–17, 29–19
Pts: Andreas Obst 24; Rebs: Isiaha Mike 6 Asts: Nenad Dimitrijević 7		Pts: Urald King 18; Rebs: Urald King 8 Asts: Steven Ashworth 8
Munich leads series 1–0

SAP Garden, Munich
Attendance: 11,500
Referees: Martin Matip, Steve Bittner, Adrian Iglesias

19 May 2026
20:30

Boxscore

Bayern Munich	92–65	Vet-Concept Gladiators Trier
Scoring by quarter: 26–19, 22–14, 25–16, 19–16
Pts: Nenad Dimitrijević 16; Rebs: Vladimir Lučić 6 Asts: Nenad Dimitrijević 9		Pts: Maik Zirbes 14; Rebs: Marco Hollersbacher 7 Asts: Steven Ashworth 5
Munich leads series 2–0

SAP Garden, Munich
Attendance: 9,847
Referees: Gentian Cici, Carsten Straube, Nermin Hodzic

23 May 2026
14:30

Boxscore

Vet-Concept Gladiators Trier	62–99	Bayern Munich
Scoring by quarter: 20–23, 13–34, 13–24, 16–18
Pts: Marco Hollersbacher 14; Rebs: Guillozet, King 4 Asts: Clayton Guillozet 4		Pts: Oscar da Silva 20; Rebs: Gabriel, Voigtmann 6 Asts: Justus Hollatz 6
Munich wins series 3–0

SWT-Arena, Trier
Attendance: 5,400
Referees: Anne Panther, Christof Madinger, Johannes Hack

=== Alba Berlin vs Rasta Vechta ===
17 May 2026
18:30

Boxscore

Alba Berlin	89–103	Rasta Vechta
Scoring by quarter: 21–25, 16–25, 24–29, 28–24
Pts: Moses Wood 20; Rebs: Justin Bean 7 Asts: Martin Hermannsson 11		Pts: Trevin Brown 30; Rebs: Luc Van Slooten 6 Asts: Alonzo Verge Jr. 6
Vechta leads series 1–0

Uber Arena, Berlin
Attendance: 8,683
Referees: Gentian Cici, Carsten Straube, Armin Mutapcic

19 May 2026
18:30

Boxscore

Alba Berlin	90–85	Rasta Vechta
Scoring by quarter: 21–23, 21–15, 26–16, 22–31
Pts: Norris Agbakoko 17; Rebs: Bean, Roberts 11; Asts: Martin Hermannsson 7		Pts: Trevin Brown 16; Rebs: TJ Bamba 6 Asts: Alonzo Verge Jr. 8
Series tied, 1–1

Uber Arena, Berlin
Attendance: 7,843
Referees: Robert Lottermoser, Kristaps Konstantinovs, Steve Bittner

22 May 2026
18:30

Boxscore

Rasta Vechta	91–82	Alba Berlin
Scoring by quarter: 22–25, 31–19, 14–21, 24–17
Pts: Alonzo Verge Jr. 24; Rebs: Tibor Pleiß 10; Asts: Alonzo Verge Jr. 10		Pts: Martin Hermannsson 19; Rebs: three players 5 Asts: Martin Hermannsson 4
Vechta leads series 2–1

Rasta Dome, Vechta
Attendance: 3,140
Referees: Martin Matip, Christian Theis, Adrian Iglesias

24 May 2026
18:30

Boxscore

Rasta Vechta	79–85	Alba Berlin
Scoring by quarter: 21–28, 23–16, 16–21, 19–20
Pts: Alonzo Verge Jr. 17; Rebs: Trevin Brown 7 Asts: Alonzo Verge Jr. 5		Pts: Martin Hermannsson 18; Rebs: Justin Bean 10; Asts: Jack Kayil 6
Series tied, 2–2

Rasta Dome, Vechta
Attendance: 3,140
Referees: Anne Panther, Benjamin Barth, Nermin Hodzic

27 May 2026
18:30

Boxscore

Alba Berlin	96–89	Rasta Vechta
Scoring by quarter: 25−19, 25−21, 24−25, 22−24
Pts: Jack Kayil 20; Rebs: Justin Bean 7 Asts: Martin Hermannsson 10		Pts: Bamba, Verge Jr. 19; Rebs: Philipp Herkenhoff 7 Asts: Alonzo Verge Jr. 5
Alba Berlin wins series, 3–2

Uber Arena, Berlin
Attendance: 8,867
Referees: Anne Panther, Gentian Cici, Christof Madinger

=== Bamberg Baskets vs ratiopharm Ulm ===
16 May 2026
18:30

Boxscore

Bamberg Baskets	80–74	ratiopharm Ulm
Scoring by quarter: 16–26, 19–15, 18–16, 27–17
Pts: Demarcus Demonia 18; Rebs: Demarcus Demonia 8 Asts: Cobe Williams 7		Pts: Ledlum, Sengfelder 13; Rebs: Ledlum, Simon 7 Asts: Justin Simon 8
Bamberg leads series 1–0

Brose Arena, Bamberg
Attendance: 5,586
Referees: Robert Lottermoser, Zulfikar Oruzgani, Christian Theis

18 May 2026
20:30

Boxscore

Bamberg Baskets	90–87	ratiopharm Ulm
Scoring by quarter: 22−18, 19−24, 32−18, 17−27
Pts: Cobe Williams 18; Rebs: Onu, Williams 6 Asts: Zachary Ensminger 5		Pts: Mark Smith 29; Rebs: Chris Ledlum 14; Asts: Chris Ledlum 5
Bamberg leads series 2–0

Brose Arena, Bamberg
Attendance: 5,360
Referees: Anne Panther, Benjamin Barth, Johannes Hack

23 May 2026
16:30

Boxscore

ratiopharm Ulm	87–96	Bamberg Baskets
Scoring by quarter: 28−27, 19−20, 19−32, 21−17
Pts: Mark Smith 21; Rebs: Christian Sengfelder 11; Asts: Thomas Klepeisz 5		Pts: Ibrahim Watson-Boye 28; Rebs: Austin Crowley 6 Asts: Demarcus Demonia 6
Bamberg wins series 3−0

ratiopharm arena, Neu-Ulm
Attendance: 5,798
Referees: Gentian Cici, Kristaps Konstantinovs, Steve Bittner

=== Telekom Baskets Bonn vs Fitness First Würzburg Baskets ===
16 May 2026
20:30

Boxscore

Telekom Baskets Bonn	54–69	Fitness First Würzburg Baskets
Scoring by quarter: 23−14, 7−16, 15−24, 9−15
Pts: Joel Aminu 12; Rebs: Kur Jongkuch 7 Asts: Grayson Murphy 4		Pts: Davion Mintz 19; Rebs: David Muenkat 8 Asts: Marcus Carr 8
Würzburg leads series 1–0

Telekom Dome, Bonn
Attendance: 6,000
Referees: Anne Panther, Kristaps Konstantinovs, Nermin Hodzic

18 May 2026
18:30

Boxscore

Telekom Baskets Bonn	88–81	Fitness First Würzburg Baskets
Scoring by quarter: 20–24, 21–19, 24–17, 23–21
Pts: Joel Aminu 16; Rebs: Jeff Garrett 9 Asts: Grayson Murphy 8		Pts: Marcus Carr 20; Rebs: Charles Thompson 6 Asts: Ivey, Thompson 2
Series tied, 1–1

Telekom Dome, Bonn
Attendance: 5,662
Referees: Martin Matip, Christof Madinger, Zulfikar Oruzgani

22 May 2026
20:30

Boxscore

Fitness First Würzburg Baskets	76–80	Telekom Baskets Bonn
Scoring by quarter: 22−17, 22−19, 7−19, 25−25
Pts: Davion Mintz 17; Rebs: Alen Pjanic 5 Asts: Marcus Carr 7		Pts: Alijah Comithier 18; Rebs: Jeff Garrett 9 Asts: Grayson Murphy 7
Bonn leads series 2–1

Tectake Arena, Würzburg
Attendance: 3,140
Referees: Carsten Straube, Benjamin Barth, Armin Mutapcic

24 May 2026
16:30

Boxscore

Fitness First Würzburg Baskets	82–70	Telekom Baskets Bonn
Scoring by quarter: 20–12, 16–19, 25–27, 21–22
Pts: Davion Mintz 14; Rebs: Stove, Thompson 6 Asts: Marcus Carr 7		Pts: Joel Aminu 16; Rebs: three players 5 Asts: Joel Aminu 5
Series tied, 2−2

Tectake Arena, Würzburg
Attendance: 2,854
Referees: Gentian Cici, Zulfikar Oruzgani, Christian Theis

27 May 2026
20:30

Boxscore

Telekom Baskets Bonn	66–63	Fitness First Würzburg Baskets
Scoring by quarter: 15–19, 7–11, 27–16, 17–17
Pts: Michael Kessens 16; Rebs: Michael Kessens 12; Asts: Grayson Murphy 5		Pts: Brae Ivey 12; Rebs: Alen Pjanic 9 Asts: Davion Mintz 5
Bonn wins series 3–2

Telekom Dome, Bonn
Attendance: 6,000
Referees: Robert Lottermoser, Carsten Straube, Kristaps Konstantinovs

== Semifinals ==
The semifinals were held from 30 May to 9 June 2026 in a best-of-five format.

=== Bayern Munich vs Telekom Baskets Bonn ===
30 May 2026
14:30

Boxscore

Bayern Munich	83–78	Telekom Baskets Bonn
Scoring by quarter: 18−21, 12−13, 20−24, 33−20
Pts: Oscar da Silva 13; Rebs: Da Silva, Gabriel 5 Asts: Nenad Dimitrijević 14		Pts: Joel Aminu 23; Rebs: Grayson Murphy 8 Asts: Finch, Murphy 5
Munich leads series 1−0

SAP Garden, Munich
Attendance: 8,100
Referees: Anne Panther, Martin Matip, Steve Bittner

1 June 2026
20:30

Boxscore

Bayern Munich	91–69	Telekom Baskets Bonn
Scoring by quarter: 23−15, 27−12, 20−27, 21−15
Pts: Xavier Rathan-Mayes 20; Rebs: Johannes Voigtmann 11; Asts: Dimitrijević, Hollatz 6		Pts: Alijah Comithier 18; Rebs: Jeff Garrett 7 Asts: Jalen Finch 5
Munich leads series 2−0

SAP Garden, Munich
Attendance: 8,200
Referees: Robert Lottermoser, Kristaps Konstantinovs, Christian Theis

4 June 2026
18:30

Boxscore

Telekom Baskets Bonn	57–77	Bayern Munich
Scoring by quarter: 17−19, 8−18, 21−24, 11−16
Pts: Tylan Birts 13; Rebs: Kur Jongkuch 7 Asts: three players 2		Pts: Xavier Rathan-Mayes 27; Rebs: Johannes Voigtmann 6 Asts: Johannes Voigtmann 8
Munich wins series 3−0

Telekom Dome, Bonn
Attendance: 6,000
Referees: Gentian Cici, Carsten Straube, Nermin Hodzic

=== Alba Berlin vs Bamberg Baskets ===
30 May 2026
16:30

Boxscore

Alba Berlin	105–86	Bamberg Baskets
Scoring by quarter: 18–19, 35–15, 30–20, 22–32
Pts: Jack Kayil 18; Rebs: Griesel, Roberts 6 Asts: Malte Delow 7		Pts: Ibrahim Watson-Boye 16; Rebs: Demarcus Demonia 7 Asts: Demonia, Ensminger 3
Berlin leads series 1−0

Max-Schmeling-Halle, Berlin
Attendance: 6,051
Referees: Gentian Cici, Christof Madinger, Armin Mutapcic

1 June 2026
18:30

Boxscore

Alba Berlin	85–71	Bamberg Baskets
Scoring by quarter: 28–21, 18–17, 24–15, 15–18
Pts: Jack Kayil 17; Rebs: J'Wan Roberts 8 Asts: Martin Hermannsson 5		Pts: Cobe Williams 14; Rebs: Daniel Keppeler 7 Asts: Demonia, Williams 2
Berlin leads series 2−0

Max-Schmeling-Halle, Berlin
Attendance: 6,833
Referees: Anne Panther, Carsten Straube, Benjamin Barth

4 June 2026
20:30

Boxscore

Bamberg Baskets	81–73	Alba Berlin
Scoring by quarter: 17–16, 22–14, 24–26, 18–17
Pts: Cobe Williams 20; Rebs: Demarcus Demonia 11; Asts: Cobe Williams 5		Pts: Agbakoko, Bean 14; Rebs: Norris Agbakoko 8 Asts: Jack Kayil 7
Berlin leads series 2−1

Brose Arena, Bamberg
Attendance: 5,700
Referees: Martin Matip, Kristaps Konstantinovs, Steve Bittner

6 June 2026
18:30

Boxscore

Bamberg Baskets	81–67	Alba Berlin
Scoring by quarter: 20–19, 16–17, 24−18, 21–13
Pts: Austin Crowley 17; Rebs: Crowley, Watson-Boye 6 Asts: Crowley 5		Pts: Michael Rataj 18; Rebs: Justin Bean 7 Asts: Martin Hermannsson 4
Series tied, 2−2

Brose Arena, Bamberg
Attendance: 5,700
Referees: Robert Lottermoser, Gentian Cici, Christian Theis

9 June 2026
20:30

Boxscore

Alba Berlin	97–66	Bamberg Baskets
Scoring by quarter: 22–17, 30–9, 18−15, 27–25
Pts: Michael Rataj 16; Rebs: Michael Rataj 9 Asts: Kayil, Mattisseck 4		Pts: Ibi Watson-Boye 16; Rebs: Richard Bálint 5 Asts: Richard Bálint 4
Berlin wins series 3−2

Uber Arena, Berlin
Attendance: 8,861
Referees: Robert Lottermoser, Anne Panther, Kristaps Konstantinovs

== Final ==
The final was held from 12 to 21 June 2026 in a best-of-five format.

12 June 2026
20:30

Boxscore

Bayern Munich	102–94	Alba Berlin
Scoring by quarter: 27–27, 31–28, 21–21, 23–18
Pts: Andreas Obst 33; Rebs: Justinian Jessup 7 Asts: Johannes Voigtmann 8		Pts: Norris Agbakoko 21; Rebs: Jack Kayil 7 Asts: Martin Hermannsson 9
Munich leads series 1−0

SAP Garden, Munich
Attendance: 10,760
Referees: Robert Lottermoser, Kristaps Konstantinovs, Steve Bittner

14 June 2026
15:30

Boxscore

Bayern Munich	79–86	Alba Berlin
Scoring by quarter: 18–24, 27–16, 15–24, 19–22
Pts: Nenad Dimitrijević 20; Rebs: Johannes Voigtmann 7 Asts: Johannes Voigtmann 3		Pts: Jack Kayil 16; Rebs: Agbakoko, Wood 4 Asts: Martin Hermannsson 6
Series tied, 1−1

SAP Garden, Munich
Attendance: 10,819
Referees: Anne Panther, Gentian Cici, Christian Theis

17 June 2026
20:30

Boxscore

Alba Berlin	83–91	Bayern Munich
Scoring by quarter: 24–25, 16–18, 20–18, 23–30
Pts: Jack Kayil 17; Rebs: Michael Rataj 8 Asts: Bean, Hermannsson 3		Pts: Nenad Dimitrijević 19; Rebs: Oscar da Silva 8 Asts: Nenad Dimitrijević 7
Munich leads series 2−1

Max-Schmeling-Halle, Berlin
Attendance: 8,899
Referees: Robert Lottermoser, Martin Matip, Steve Bittner

19 June 2026
20:30

Boxscore

Alba Berlin	71–61	Bayern Munich
Scoring by quarter: 26–23, 16–22, 16–9, 13–7
Pts: Justin Bean 17; Rebs: Justin Bean 9 Asts: Martin Hermannsson 4		Pts: Nenad Dimitrijević 14; Rebs: Isiaha Mike 7 Asts: three players 2
Series tied, 2−2

Max-Schmeling-Halle, Berlin
Attendance: 8,899
Referees: Anne Panther, Gentian Cici, Kristaps Konstantinovs

21 June 2026
16:30

Boxscore

Bayern Munich	81–84	Alba Berlin
Scoring by quarter: 25–20, 22–7, 19–26, 15–31
Pts: Andreas Obst 24; Rebs: Giffey 7 Asts: Dimitrijević, Voigtmann 4		Pts: Bean, Mattisseck 18; Rebs: Justin Bean 12; Asts: Martin Hermannsson 8
Berlin wins series 3−2

SAP Garden, Munich
Attendance: 11,500
Referees: Robert Lottermoser, Martin Matip, Gentian Cici
