= 2025–26 BBL-Pokal =

- Dates: 23 September 2025 – 23 February 2026
- Games played: 23
- Teams: 24

Regular season
- Season MVP: Demarcus Demonia

Finals
- Champions: Bamberg Baskets
- Runners-up: Alba Berlin

The 2025–26 BBL-Pokal was the 59th season of the BBL-Pokal, the domestic cup competition of the Basketball Bundesliga (BBL).

Bamberg Baskets won their seventh title with a win over Alba Berlin.

== Format ==
The top eight teams of the 2024–25 Basketball Bundesliga received a bye and moved on to the round of 16. The teams that placed ninth to 16th were seeded and the relegated team, together with the top seven-placed teams from the ProA from the previous season, were unseeded for the draw. The team from the unseeded group had home-advantage. After that an open draw was used for the other rounds.

== Schedule ==
The rounds of the 2025–26 competition was scheduled as follows:

| Round | Matches |
|---|---|
| First round | 21–24 September 2025 |
| Round of 16 | 17–20 October 2025 |
| Quarterfinals | 13–17 November 2025 |
| Final four | 21–22 February 2026 |

== First round ==
The draw took place on 15 July 2025. The games took place between 21 and 24 September 2025.

21 September 2025
15:00

Boxscore

| Giessen 46ers | 70–80 | Rasta Vechta |
Scoring by quarter: 21–23, 18–18, 17–14, 14–25
| Pts: Jonathan Maier 19; Rebs: Domagoj Vuković 6 Asts: Junaković, Krajčovič 6 | | Pts: Tommy Kuhse 25; Rebs: TJ Bamba 5 Asts: three players 3 |

Sporthalle Gießen-Ost, Gießen
Attendance: 1,809
Referees: Christian Theis, Moritz Krüper, Nicolas Brendel

23 September 2025
18:30

Boxscore

| Phoenix Hagen | 82–101 | Rostock Seawolves |
Scoring by quarter: 18–27, 20–26, 25–24, 19–24
| Pts: Devin Schmidt 20; Rebs: Fabian Bleck 7 Asts: Bjarne Kraushaar 6 | | Pts: D'Shawn Schwartz 19; Rebs: Andy Van Vliet 9 Asts: DeAndre Lansdowne 9 |

Ischelandhalle, Hagen
Attendance: 2,287
Referees: Steve Bittner, Benedikt Loder, Radeesh Kattur

23 September 2025
18:30

Boxscore

| Tigers Tübingen | 67–87 | Gladiators Trier |
Scoring by quarter: 19–25, 16–23, 23–19, 9–20
| Pts: JaCobi Wood 22; Rebs: Pelote, Milner 6 Asts: JaCobi Wood 6 | | Pts: Eli Brooks 17; Rebs: Urald King 13; Asts: Eli Brooks 4 |

Paul Horn-Arena, Tübingen
Attendance: 1,229
Referees: Clemens Fritz, Armin Mutapcic, Enrico Streit

23 September 2025
20:00

Boxscore

| BG Göttingen | 84–91 | Telekom Baskets Bonn |
Scoring by quarter: 28–20, 19–22, 17–30, 20–19
| Pts: Jordan Sears 13; Rebs: Kevin Buckingham 7 Asts: Daniel Kirchner 8 | | Pts: Tylan Birts 24; Rebs: Michael Kessens 8 Asts: Grayson Murphy 12 |

Sparkassen-Arena, Göttingen
Attendance: 1,868
Referees: Carsten Straube, Adrian Iglesias, Sascha Gilbert

24 September 2025
18:30

Boxscore

| Crailsheim Merlins | 78–85 | Science City Jena |
Scoring by quarter: 13–13, 23–17, 25–30, 17–25
| Pts: Brock Gardner 19; Rebs: three players 5 Asts: Anthony Gaines 8 | | Pts: Keith Braxton 22; Rebs: three players 5 Asts: Eric Washington 4 |

Arena Hohenlohe, Crailsheim
Attendance: 2,350
Referees: Kristaps Konstantinovs, Nermin Hodzic, Nicolas Rotter

24 September 2025
18:30

Boxscore

| Skyliners Frankfurt | 96–101 (OT) | Riesen Ludwigsburg |
Scoring by quarter: 21–19, 19–20, 19–20, 24–24, Overtime: 13–18
| Pts: William Christmas 22; Rebs: William Christmas 9 Asts: Logan Johnson 7 | | Pts: Stef Smith 35; Rebs: Yorman Polas Bartolo 9 Asts: Stef Smith 5 |

Süwag Energie ARENA, Frankfurt
Attendance: 1,200
Referees: Christof Madinger, Johannes Hack, Andreas Bohn

24 September 2025
20:00

Boxscore

| Eisbären Bremerhaven | 75–97 | Baskets Oldenburg |
Scoring by quarter: 23–31, 9–20, 25–23, 18–23
| Pts: Carlos Carter 10; Rebs: Elijah Miller 4 Asts: Falkenthal, Miller 5 | | Pts: Chris Clemons 23; Rebs: Filip Stanić 7 Asts: Brian Fobbs 4 |

Bremerhaven Stadthalle, Bremerhaven
Attendance: 4,154
Referees: Gentian Cici, Dennis Sirowi, Aleksandra Pawlik

24 September 2025
20:00

Boxscore

| Hamburg Towers | 89–94 | Bamberg Baskets |
Scoring by quarter: 16–25, 22–20, 27–17, 24–32
| Pts: Justin Elder-Davis 24; Rebs: Justin Elder-Davis 14; Asts: L. J. Thorpe 6 | | Pts: Cobe Williams 25; Rebs: Demarcus Demonia 8 Asts: Cobe Williams 5 |

Inselpark Arena, Hamburg
Attendance: 1,679
Referees: Robert Lottermoser, Zulfikar Oruzgani, Tamer Arik

== Round of 16 ==
The draw took place on 15 July 2025. The games took place between 17 and 20 October 2025.

17 October 2025
20:00

Boxscore

| Gladiators Trier | 107–90 | Telekom Baskets Bonn |
Scoring by quarter: 31–22, 27–24, 27–21, 22–23
| Pts: Eli Brooks 24; Rebs: four players 5 Asts: Eli Brooks 9 | | Pts: Jeff Garrett 20; Rebs: Michael Kessens 6 Asts: Grayson Murphy 7 |

Trier Arena, Trier
Attendance: 4,559
Referees: Kristaps Konstantinovs, Armin Mutapcic, Tamer Arik

18 October 2025
18:30

Boxscore

| Baskets Oldenburg | 61–60 | Würzburg Baskets |
Scoring by quarter: 13–19, 25–15, 11–8, 12–18
| Pts: Nicholas Tischler 19; Rebs: James Woodard 10; Asts: Tischler, Woodard 3 | | Pts: Davion Mintz 21; Rebs: Johnathan Stove 6 Asts: Marcus Carr 6 |

Große EWE Arena, Oldenburg
Attendance: 6,200
Referees: Carsten Straube. Nermin Hodzic, Nicolas Rotter

18 October 2025
20:00

Boxscore

| Mitteldeutscher BC | 78–105 | Bamberg Baskets |
Scoring by quarter: 18–18, 28–32, 16–33, 16–22
| Pts: Charles Callison 29; Rebs: Marcus Foster 6 Asts: Khyri Thomas 3 | | Pts: Cobe Williams 22; Rebs: Ensminger, Watson-Boye 7 Asts: Richard Bálint 6 |

Stadthalle Weißenfels, Weißenfels
Attendance: 1,750
Referees: Robert Lottermoser, Johannes Hack, Nicolas Brendel

19 October 2025
15:00

Boxscore

| USC Heidelberg | 82–73 | Riesen Ludwigsburg |
Scoring by quarter: 23–18, 18–10, 20–26, 21–19
| Pts: DJ Horne 23; Rebs: DJ Horne 8 Asts: Michael Weathers 7 | | Pts: Elijah Hughes 22; Rebs: Babacar Sané 9 Asts: Brandon Tischler 4 |

SNP Dome, Heidelberg
Attendance: 3,009
Referees: Christof Madinger, Clemens Fritz, Benedikt Loder

19 October 2025
15:00

Boxscore

| Rostock Seawolves | 79–80 | Science City Jena |
Scoring by quarter: 16–25, 14–12, 28–20, 21–23
| Pts: TJ Crockett 23; Rebs: D'Shawn Schwartz 11; Asts: TJ Crockett 5 | | Pts: Great Osobor 15; Rebs: Lorenz Bank 8 Asts: Tavian Dunn-Martin 4 |

Stadthalle Rostock, Rostock
Attendance: 2,840
Referees: Steve Bittner, Moritz Krüper, Adrian Iglesias

19 October 2025
16:30

Boxscore

| Alba Berlin | 90–68 | Ratiopharm Ulm |
Scoring by quarter: 16–26, 23–16, 28–12, 23–14
| Pts: Boogie Ellis 21; Rebs: J'Wan Roberts 6 Asts: Martin Hermannsson 7 | | Pts: Bryce Brown 17; Rebs: Tobias Jensen 5 Asts: three players 3 |

Uber Arena, Berlin
Attendance: 6,132
Referees: Martin Matip, Christian Theis, Dennis Sirowi

19 October 2025
18:00

Boxscore

| Rasta Vechta | 89–86 | Niners Chemnitz |
Scoring by quarter: 16–22, 18–18, 23–25, 32–21
| Pts: Alonzo Verge Jr. 38; Rebs: Lars Thiemann 6 Asts: Alonzo Verge Jr. 8 | | Pts: Davis Jr., Mushidi 16; Rebs: Amadou Sow 10; Asts: Davis Jr., Mushidi 5 |

Rasta Dome, Vechta
Attendance: 2,889
Referees: Anne Panther, Gentian Cici, Radeesh Kattur

20 October 2025
20:00

Boxscore

| Bayern Munich | 99–64 | Basketball Löwen Braunschweig |
Scoring by quarter: 24–14, 22–13, 28–18, 25–19
| Pts: Justus Hollatz 21; Rebs: Leon Kratzer 9 Asts: Vladimir Lučić 5 | | Pts: Ferdinand Zylka 18; Rebs: Flanigan, N'Guessan 5 Asts: Grant Sherfield 6 |

BMW Park, Munich
Attendance: 5,225
Referees: Benjamin Barth, Oliver Krausen, Andreas Bohn

== Quarterfinals ==
The draw took place on 20 October 2025. The games took place between 13 and 17 November 2025.

13 November 2025
20:00

Boxxscore

| Bamberg Baskets | 72–66 | USC Heidelberg |
Scoring by quarter: 18–15, 16–12, 16–15, 22–24
| Pts: Demarcus Demonia 21; Rebs: three players 6 Asts: Cobe Williams 4 | | Pts: Michael Weathers 20; Rebs: Samuell Williamson 8 Asts: Marcus Weathers 5 |

Brose Arena, Bamberg
Attendance: 3,720
Referees: Anne Panther, Zulfikar Oruzgani, Johannes Hack

16 November 2025
18:00

Boxscore

| Gladiators Trier | 80–96 | Bayern Munich |
Scoring by quarter: 17–23, 20–28, 22–22, 21–23
| Pts: Eli Brooks 19; Rebs: three players 6 Asts: Eli Brooks 5 | | Pts: Justinian Jessup 14; Rebs: Jessup, Voigtmann 6 Asts: Stefan Jović 4 |

SWT-Arena, Trier
Attendance: 5,400
Referees: Martin Matip, Kristaps Konstantinovs, Steve Bittner

17 November 2025
18:30

Boxscore

| Rasta Vechta | 69–72 | Baskets Oldenburg |
Scoring by quarter: 19–15, 20–15, 16–26, 14–16
| Pts: Alonzo Verge Jr. 15; Rebs: Alonzo Verge Jr. 7 Asts: Van Slooten, Verge Jr. 5 | | Pts: Chris Clemons 20; Rebs: Clemons, Kyser 7 Asts: Chris Clemons 4 |

Rasta Dome, Vechta
Attendance: 3,140
Referees: Robert Lottermoser, Christian Theis, Oliver Krause

17 November 2025
20:00

Boxscore

| Alba Berlin | 91–78 | Science City Jena |
Scoring by quarter: 23–24, 22–27, 25–6, 21–21
| Pts: Kayil, Hermannsson 18; Rebs: Justin Bean 10; Asts: Sam Griesel 4 | | Pts: Great Osobor 17; Rebs: Lorenz Bank 10; Asts: Eric Washington 6 |

Uber Arena, Berlin
Attendance: 6,647
Referees: Gentian Cici, Christof Madinger, Nermin Hodzic

== Final four ==
The draw took place on 18 November 2025. The games will take place on 21 and 22 February 2025 in Munich.

=== Bracket ===
Semi-finals
21 February
Bayern Munich | 97
Bamberg Baskets (OT) | 103
21 February
Alba Berlin | 98
Baskets Oldenburg | 78

Final
22 February
Bamberg Baskets | 74
Alba Berlin | 72

=== Semifinals ===
21 February 2026
16:00

Boxscore

| Bayern Munich | 97–103 (OT) | Bamberg Baskets |
Scoring by quarter: 22–20, 14–14, 17–20, 30–28, Overtime: 14–20
| Pts: Nenad Dimitrijević 24; Rebs: Isiaha Mike 12; Asts: Nenad Dimitrijević 7 | | Pts: Ibrahim Watson-Boye 24; Rebs: Moritz Krimmer 8 Asts: Cobe Williams 10 |

SAP Garden, Munich
Attendance: 11,500
Referees: Anne Panther, Carsten Straube, Christian Theis

21 February 2026
19:00

Boxscore

| Alba Berlin | 98–78 | Baskets Oldenburg |
Scoring by quarter: 29–18, 17–20, 25–23, 27–17
| Pts: Malte Delow 21; Rebs: Norris Agbakoko 10; Asts: Jack Kayil 8 | | Pts: Chris Clemons 29; Rebs: Nicholas Tischler 5 Asts: Nicholas Tischler 4 |

SAP Garden, Munich
Attendance: 11,500
Referees: Robert Lottermoser, Gentian Cici, Nermin Hodzic

=== Final ===
22 February 2026
16:30

Boxscore

| Bamberg Baskets | 74–72 | Alba Berlin |
Scoring by quarter: 15–22, 21–15, 16–21, 22–14
| Pts: Demarcus Demonia 19; Rebs: Zachry Ensminger 6 Asts: Zachry Ensminger 8 | | Pts: Malte Delow 17; Rebs: Bean, Kayil 7 Asts: Jack Kayil 4 |

SAP Garden, Munich
Attendance: 11,500
Referees: Robert Lottermoser, Anne Panther, Carsten Straube
