= Steven Ashworth =

American basketball player (born 2000)

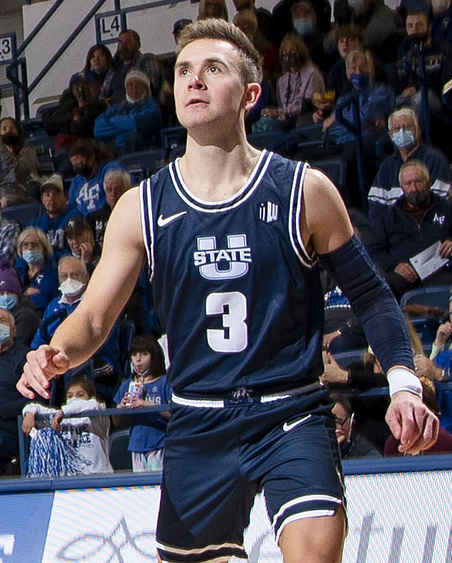
- Ashworth in 2021

Free agent
- Position: Point guard

Personal information
- Born: May 1, 2000 (age 26) Alpine, Utah, U.S.
- Listed height: 6 ft 0 in (1.83 m)
- Listed weight: 175 lb (79 kg)

Career information
- High school: Lone Peak (Highland, Utah)
- College: Utah State (2020–2023); Creighton (2023–2025)
- NBA draft: 2025: undrafted
- Playing career: 2025–present

Career history
- 2025: Noblesville Boom
- 2026: Gladiators Trier

Career highlights
- First-team All-Mountain West (2023); Second-team All-Big East (2025)
- Stats at NBA.com
- Stats at Basketball Reference

Steven Ashworth (born May 1, 2000) is an American professional basketball player who last played for the Gladiators Trier of the Basketball Bundesliga. He played college basketball for the Utah State Aggies and Creighton Bluejays.

== Early life and high school ==
Ashworth attended Lone Peak High School. He averaged 16.4 points, 7.4 assists, 4.1 rebounds, and 3.1 steals per game as a senior. Ashworth led the team to the Utah 6A state title and was named Utah Valley Boys Basketball Player of the Year as well as first team all-state. He committed to play college basketball at Utah State.

== College career ==
As a freshman, Ashworth averaged 6.1 points and 2.6 assists per game. He averaged 8.7 points and 3.6 assists per game as a sophomore. Ashworth averaged 16.2 points, 4.5 assists, 3.3 rebounds and 1.2 steals per game as a junior, earning First Team All-Mountain West Conference honors. Following the season, Ashworth transferred to Creighton, choosing the Bluejays over BYU, Gonzaga, Oklahoma State, Washington and VCU. As a senior, he averaged 11.1 points and 4.2 assists per game. Ashworth averaged 16.4 points, 4.1 rebounds and 6.8 assists per game as a fifth-year senior. He was named to the Second Team All-Big East.

== Professional career ==
After going unselected in the 2025 NBA draft, Ashworth signed with the Indiana Pacers as a free agent. He was waived on September 23. On November 5, the Noblesville Boom, the NBA G League affiliate of the Indiana Pacers, announced Ashworth would be on the 2025-2026 roster.

On January 2, 2026, he signed a contract with VET CONCEPT Gladiators Trier of the German Basketball Bundesliga.

== Personal life ==
Ashworth is a member of the Church of Jesus Christ of Latter-day Saints and served two years as a missionary in Indiana prior to enrolling in college. He married Peyton in 2022 and the couple had a child, Tommy Jay, who was born in June 2024.
