= Justin Bean =

American basketball player (born 1996)

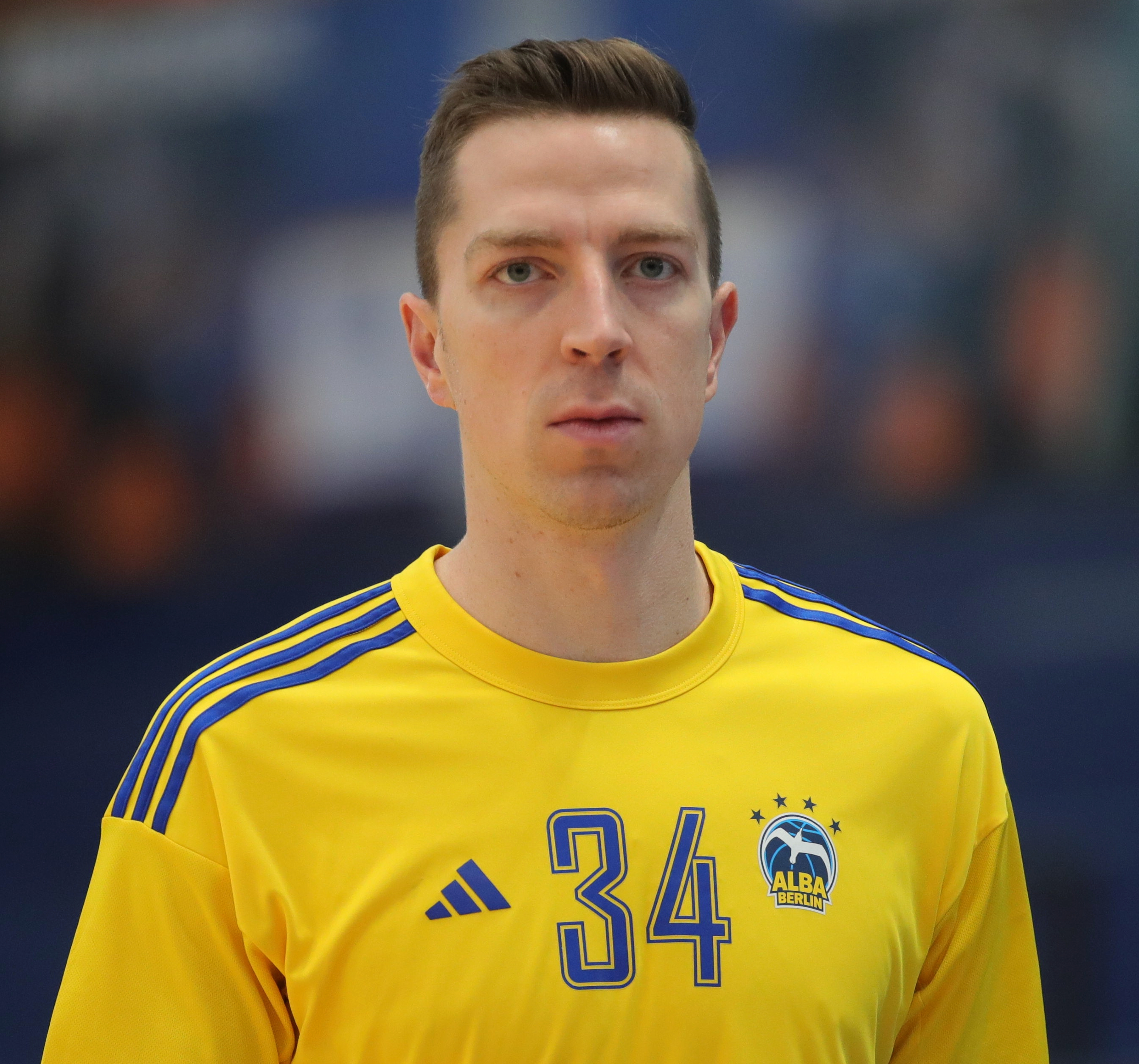
- Bean with Alba Berlin in 2023

No. 34 – Alba Berlin
- Position: Power forward / small forward
- League: BBL

Personal information
- Born: November 17, 1996 (age 29) Moore, Oklahoma, U.S.
- Listed height: 6 ft 7 in (2.01 m)
- Listed weight: 210 lb (95 kg)

Career information
- High school: Southmoore (Moore, Oklahoma)
- College: Utah State (2018–2022)
- NBA draft: 2022: undrafted
- Playing career: 2022–present

Career history
- 2022–2023: Memphis Hustle
- 2023–present: Alba Berlin

Career highlights
- Bundesliga Finals MVP (2026); German Bundesliga Champion (2026); 2x Second-team All-Mountain West (2021, 2022); Third-team All-Mountain West (2020); Mountain West All-Defensive Team (2020)
- Stats at NBA.com
- Stats at Basketball Reference

Justin Barrus Bean (born November 17, 1996) is an American professional basketball player for Alba Berlin of the German Basketball Bundesliga (BBL). He played college basketball for the Utah State Aggies.

== High school career ==
Bean played basketball for Southmoore High School in Moore, Oklahoma. As a junior, he averaged about 22 points and 11 rebounds per game, but tore his anterior cruciate ligament in practice before the state playoffs. Bean returned in time for his senior season, averaging 16 points and nine rebounds per game. Following his graduation, he served a two-year mission for the Church of Jesus Christ of Latter-day Saints in Reno, Nevada.

== College career ==
Bean joined Utah State as a preferred walk-on, and redshirted his first season with the team. He earned a scholarship in the middle of his freshman season. As a freshman, Bean averaged 4.1 points and 3.8 rebounds per game. In his sophomore season, he averaged 11.9 points and 10.5 rebounds per game, earning Third Team All-Mountain West and All-Defensive Team recognition. He became the first Utah State player to average a double-double since Mike Santos in the 1976–77 season. As a junior, Bean averaged 11.4 points and 7.7 rebounds per game, and was named to the Second Team All-Mountain West. On November 18, 2021, he posted a career-high 33 points and 16 rebounds in an 87–79 win against Penn in double overtime. Bean was named to the Second Team All-Mountain West as a senior. As a senior, he averaged 17.4 points, 9.9 rebounds and 2.6 assists per game. On March 23, 2022, Bean declared for the 2022 NBA draft, forgoing an extra season of college eligibility.

== Professional career ==
=== Memphis Hustle (2022–2023) ===
After going undrafted in the 2022 NBA draft, Bean signed with the Memphis Grizzlies on September 23, 2022. However, he was waived on October 10 and on November 4, Bean was named to the opening night roster for the Memphis Hustle.

=== Alba Berlin (2023–present) ===
On July 19, 2023, Bean signed with Alba Berlin of the Basketball Bundesliga and EuroLeague. He became a fan favorite quickly and was a very important part in winning the german championship in 2026. He even won finals MVP. In July 2026, the team signed a long-term contract extension with Bean through the 2028-2029 season.

== Career statistics ==
Legend
GP	Games played	GS	Games started	MPG	Minutes per game
FG%	Field-goal percentage	3P%	3-point field-goal percentage	FT%	Free-throw percentage
RPG	Rebounds per game	APG	Assists per game	SPG	Steals per game
BPG	Blocks per game	PPG	Points per game	PIR	Performance index rating
**Bold**	Career high

=== EuroLeague ===
Year	Team	GP	GS	MPG	FG%	3P%	FT%	RPG	APG	SPG	BPG	PPG	PIR
2023–24	Alba Berlin	27	8	15.4	.432	.361	.714	3.0	.7	.7	.4	3.9	5.9
Career		27	8	15.4	.432	.361	.714	3.0	.7	.7	.4	3.9	5.9

=== Domestic leagues ===
Year	Team	League	GP	MPG	FG%	3P%	FT%	RPG	APG	SPG	BPG	PPG
2022–23	(United States) Memphis Hustle	G League	1	32.6	.600	.500	1.000	14.0	—	2.0	1.0	15.0
2023–24	(Germany) Alba Berlin	BBL	38	18.7	.497	.386	.847	4.7	1.2	.7	.4	6.3

=== College ===
Year	Team	GP	GS	MPG	FG%	3P%	FT%	RPG	APG	SPG	BPG	PPG
2017–18	Utah State	Redshirt										
2018–19	Utah State	29	0	12.1	.512	.167	.763	3.8	.8	.7	.3	4.1
2019–20	Utah State	**34**	**34**	29.7	.518	.276	.806	**10.5**	2.1	1.5	**.7**	11.9
2020–21	Utah State	29	29	27.1	.518	.238	**.829**	7.7	1.9	1.3	.3	11.4
2021–22	Utah State	**34**	**34**	**35.4**	**.534**	**.465**	.800	9.9	**2.6**	**1.6**	.5	**17.4**
Career		126	97	26.6	.524	.369	.804	8.1	1.9	1.3	.4	11.5

== Personal life ==
Bean's father, Gordon, played college basketball for Ricks College and Idaho State. At Utah State, Bean signed a Name, Image and Likeness deal with USU Credit Union and additionally, TacoTime; the company had previously wanted to promote its bean burritos at Utah State home games, as the team featured Bean and Diogo Brito.
