= Jack Kayil =

German basketball player (born 2006)

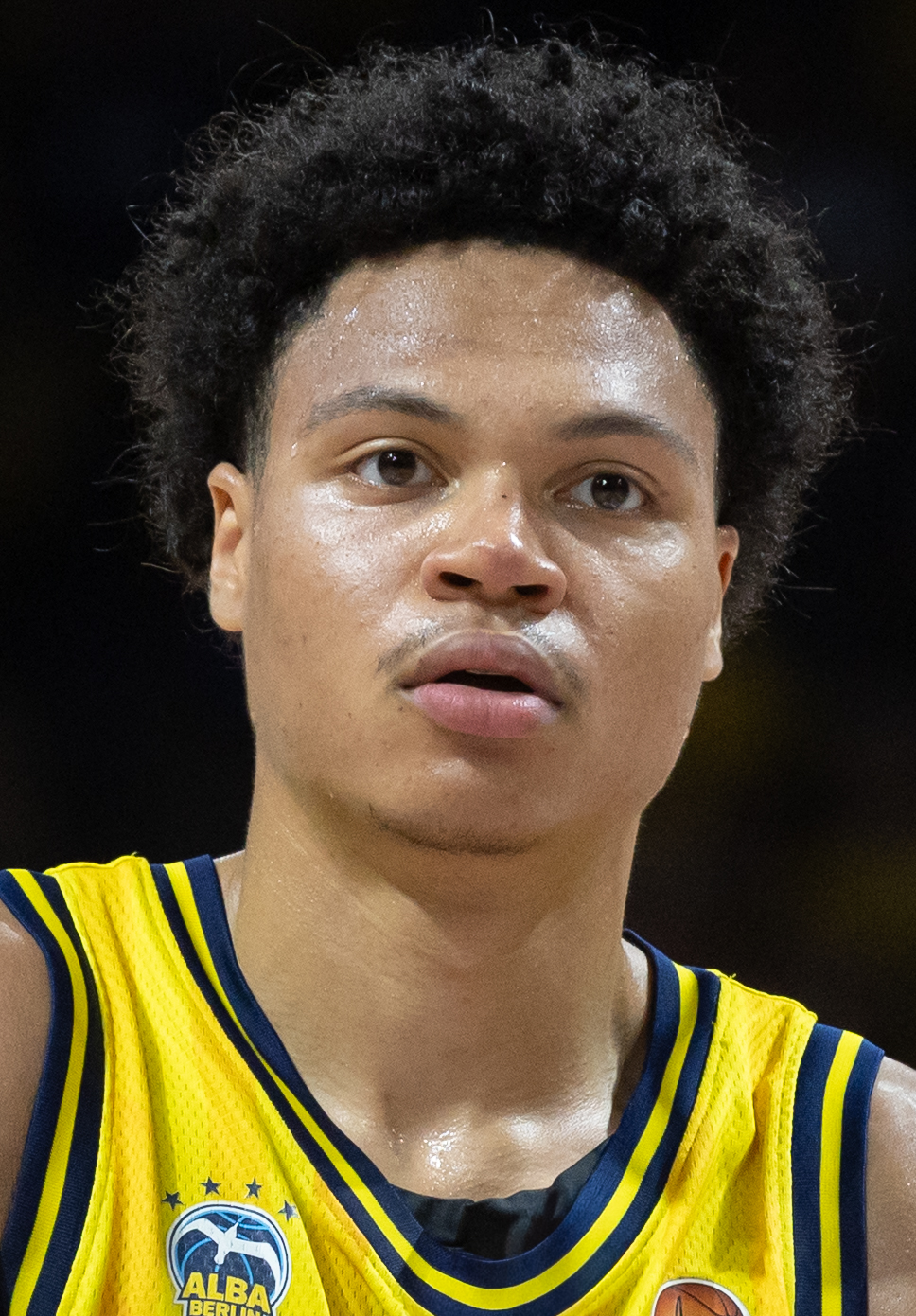
- Jack Kayil in 2026 with Alba Berlin

No. 7 – Alba Berlin
- Position: Point guard
- League: BBL

Personal information
- Born: 27 January 2006 (age 20) Berlin, Germany
- Listed height: 1.91 m (6 ft 3 in)
- Listed weight: 79 kg (174 lb)

Career information
- NBA draft: 2026: 2nd round, 39th overall pick
- Drafted by: Houston Rockets
- Playing career: 2022–present

Career history
- 2022–2023: Alba Berlin II
- 2023–2024: Rasta Vechta II
- 2024–2026: Mega
- 2025–2026: →Alba Berlin
- 2026–present: Alba Berlin

Career highlights
- All-FIBA Champions League Second Team (2026); FIBA Champions League Best Young Player (2026); German Bundesliga champion (2026); Bundesliga Best Young Player (2026)
- Stats at NBA.com
- Stats at Basketball Reference
Medals
Men's basketball
Representing Germany
FIBA U19 World Cup
Silver medal – second place	2025 Switzerland	Team
FIBA U18 EuroBasket
Gold medal – first place	2024 Finland	Team
Bronze medal – third place	2023 Serbia	Team
FIBA U16 EuroBasket
Gold medal – first place	2022 Bulgaria	Team
AST World Under-18 Tournament
Bronze medal – third place	2024 Germany	Team

Jack Freeman Kayil (born 27 January 2006) is a German professional basketball player for Alba Berlin of the Basketball Bundesliga (BBL). He was drafted in the second round of the 2026 NBA draft.

== Professional career ==
=== Club career ===
Kayil played in the youth system of the Berlin-based club TuS Neukölln, before joining the youth academy of Alba Berlin. During the 2022–23 season, he made 20 appearances for Alba Berlin’s second men’s team in the 2nd Regionalliga, averaging 12.3 points per game.

With Alba Berlin’s youth team, Kayil won the German U19 championship in 2023 and was named the best rookie of the Nachwuchs-Basketball-Bundesliga (NBBL).

In July 2023, SC Rasta Vechta announced Kayil’s signing, initially assigning him to the club’s youth program and second men’s team in the ProA league. In August 2023, Kayil took part in the Basketball Without Borders scouting camp organised by FIBA and the NBA.

In May 2024, playing for the joint youth team Quakenbrück/Vechta, Kayil won another German U19 championship and was named Most Valuable Player of the final tournament.

After the conclusion of the 2023–24 season, Kayil left Vechta and signed with Serbian club KK Mega Basket. During the 2024–25 season in the ABA League, he averaged 7.7 points across 18 appearances.

In 2025, Kayil returned to Alba Berlin on loan. He averaged 12.4 points per game in 32 appearances and helped Alba win the German Bundesliga.

On 7 August 2026, Kayil signed a five-year contract with Alba Berlin. In October 2026, Kayil sustained a calf muscle injury and would have to miss several weeks.

=== NBA rights ===
On 19 November 2025, Kayil committed to play college basketball at Gonzaga University. On 24 April 2026, he announced to forgo his commitment and declared for the NBA Draft.

On 24 June 2026, the Houston Rockets selected Kayil with the 39th overall pick in the 2026 NBA draft. He was immediately traded alongside a 2029 second-round pick to the New York Knicks in exchange for the draft rights of Bruce Thornton, the 31st overall pick of the draft. He was the third German player selected in the draft after Hannes Steinbach (14th) and Christian Anderson (18th), who were both selected by the Charlotte Hornets.

== National team career ==
In 2022, Kayil competed at the U16 Division B European Championship and won the tournament with the Germany U16 national team.

At the 2023 U18 European Championship, he averaged 10 points per game and helped Germany secure the bronze medal. In August 2024, Kayil won the gold medal with the Germany U18 national team at the European Championship held in Tampere, Finland.

In November 2024, national team head coach Álex Mumbrú called Kayil up to the senior Germany national team for the first time, where he made his debut in a EuroBasket 2025 qualifier against Sweden.

At the 2025 FIBA U19 World Cup, Kayil reached the final with Germany, where the team lost to the United States. He averaged 11.1 points, 3.6 rebounds and 6.6 assists per game during the tournament. At the end 2025, Kayil played two matches for the Germany senior team in the 2027 FIBA World Cup qualifiers, helping them in wins over Israel and Cyprus, leading Germany in assists in the second game.

== Achievements and awards ==
=== International ===
- Gold medal – U18 European Championship: 2024
- Gold medal – U16 Division B European Championship: 2022
- Bronze medal – U18 European Championship: 2023
- Bronze medal – Albert Schweitzer Tournament: 2024

=== Club ===
- German U19 champion: 2023, 2024

=== Individual ===
- NBBL Top Four Most Valuable Player: 2024
- EuroLeague Adidas Next Generation Tournament Final Eight – All-Tournament Team: 2024
