= Alba Berlin =

German basketball club

- Nickname: Berlin Albatrosse
- Leagues: BBL; Champions League
- Founded: 1991; 35 years ago
- History: Alba Berlin (1991–present)
- Arena: Uber Arena
- Capacity: 14,500
- Location: Berlin, Germany
- Team colors: Yellow, navy, blue
- President: Axel Schweitzer
- General manager: Marco Baldi
- Head coach: Pedro Calles
- Team captain: Jonas Mattisseck
- Championships: 1 FIBA Korać Cup; 12 German Championships; 11 German Cups; 3 German Super cups
- Retired numbers: 2 (4, 12)
- Website: albaberlin.de
Home	Away	Third

Alba Berlin is a professional basketball club based in Berlin, Germany. The club was founded in 1991, and became the largest German national basketball club by membership figures. Alba Berlin hosts its home games at the Uber Arena and competes in the Basketball Bundesliga (BBL) and the Champions League.

After winning eleven German Championships, eleven German Cups, three German Supercups, and the FIBA Korać Cup in 1995, Alba Berlin is considered to be the most successful German basketball team, both domestically and internationally. With an average attendance of more than 10,000 fans per game in a season, it is also one of the most popular basketball clubs in Europe. In 2013, Alba was portrayed in the ESPN documentary series Basketball Capitals. In 2014, the club was the first German basketball team to beat a reigning NBA champion, the San Antonio Spurs.

== History ==
=== 1991–2000: Foundation and first championships ===
Alba Berlin traces its history back to the BG Charlottenburg, a basketball club in western Berlin which was founded in 1989. In 1991, when the global recycling company ALBA Europe agreed to a significant basketball sponsorship, BG Charlottenburg changed its name to Alba Berlin.

Shortly thereafter, under the direction of head coach Faruk Kulenović, Alba Berlin became runner-up at the German Championship. In 1993, the Serbian Svetislav Pešić took over as coach, and the club gained successes that no other German basketball team had previously accomplished. Winning the FIBA Korać Cup in 1995 marked the first international title of a German club team in basketball.

In 1996, shortly after moving the club from the Sömmeringhalle to the Max-Schmeling-Halle, Alba Berlin finally beat series champion Bayer Leverkusen and won its long-awaited first German Championship. In addition to winning the Korać Cup and other successes at the European level, in his seven-year career as head coach, Pešić won four German championships and one German Cup.

=== 2000–2008: Professionalization and national success ===
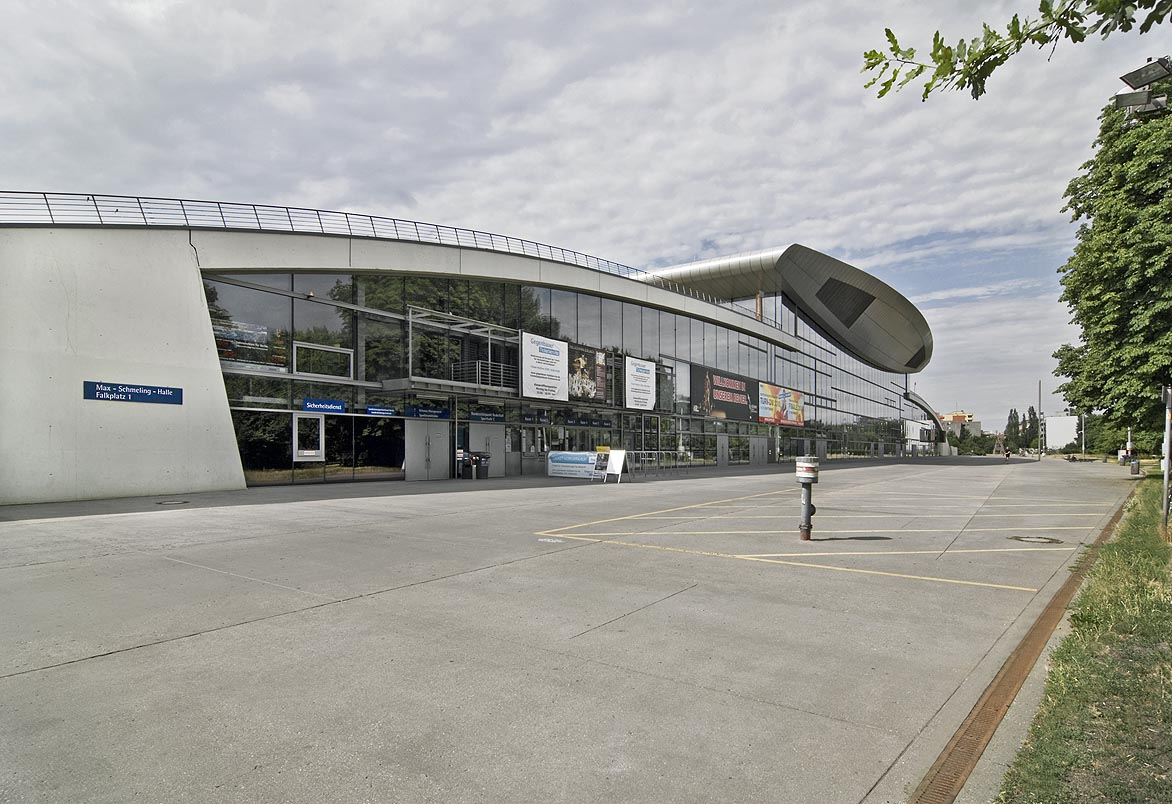
The Max-Schmeling-Halle was the team's home arena from 1996 until 2008

Under head coach Emir Mutapčić, the team recorded three German championships and two German Cup victories, but particularly at the European level no significant progress could be made. As a reaction to the time without titles, the team was largely rebuilt for each new season. In 2004 and 2005, Berlin eventually was kicked out of the national playoffs semi-final series. Organizationally, the club created the new position of team manager, which was occupied by Henning Harnisch. Further, the professional section of the club was transformed into a GmbH on 1 September 2005.

In the season 2005–06, under new coach Henrik Rödl, Alba Berlin won another German Cup. As winner of the regular season, the team advanced to the finals series of the championship, in which they lost to RheinEnergie Köln. Köln was coached by Saša Obradović, who had helped Berlin win the FIBA Korać Cup in 1995. The following season, 2006–07, however, Berlin was once again winner of the regular season but was eliminated in the quarter-finals by the Artland Dragons. This event triggered the dismissal of Rödl and the signing of a new head coach Luka Pavićević, followed by another major remodeling of the team. After injury problems in the preparation and the course of the 2007–08 season, including the loss of Goran Jeretin for the entire season and Aleksandar Rašić for the play-offs, Berlin took advantage of the insolvency of the Cologne 99ers and signed their major players Immanuel McElroy and Aleksandar Nađfeji in January 2008. Led by the league MVP Julius Jenkins, the team was superior to all other competitors in the play-offs and won the championship again after a five-year hiatus.

In the 2003–04 season, Berlin achieved its last master qualification to participate in the highest European League, the EuroLeague. Between the 2004–05 and 2007–08 seasons, the team was only able to qualify for the ULEB Cup, the second-highest European league. There, the team only made it beyond the first round in the 2006–07 season, when they were eliminated in the second round.

=== 2008–present: current era ===
With the move into the new 14,500-seat O2 World Berlin, the then-reigning champion Alba Berlin opened a new chapter in the club's history. Berlin was the first team in German history to average more than 7,000 fans in attendance per game. Thus, Alba's manager Marco Baldi and supervisory board chairman, Axel Schweitzer, decided to take the next step towards a permanent presence in international competition and appropriate presentation options. The Anschutz Group, owner of the O2 World Berlin, and Alba Berlin agreed to a 15-year contract until 2023, with an option for another ten years.

As the reigning German champion, Alba participated in the 2008–09 Euroleague. There, the team reached the Top 16, where it could not hold its ground against European elite clubs like FC Barcelona, Real Madrid, and Maccabi Tel Aviv. Yet, Alba had Europe's highest attendance at 11,264 spectators in the O2 World Berlin. In addition, the club gathered 14,800 spectators in the main round home game against Union Olimpija, a record crowd at a European Cup game in Germany. While at the national level in the cup final, Alba defeated Baskets Bonn. Later, Alba was beaten by the same team in the play-off semi-final series in five games.

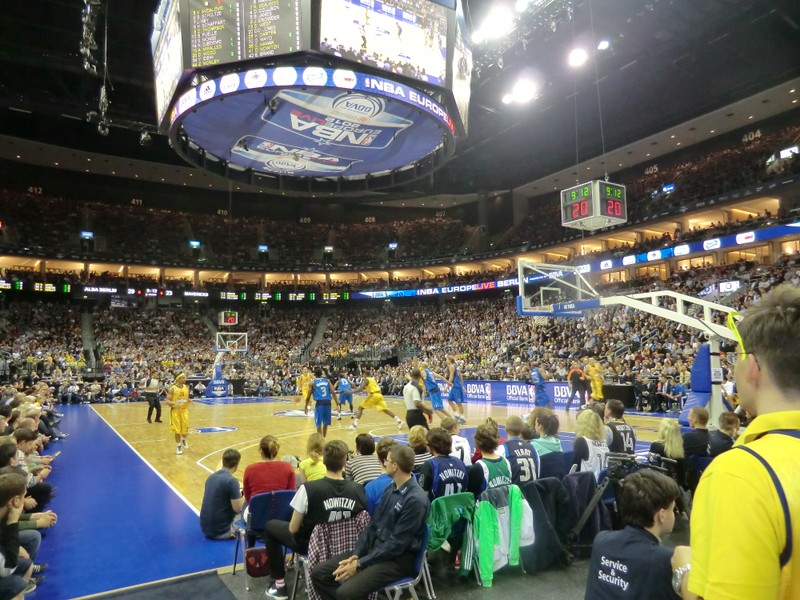
Alba Berlin vs the Dallas Mavericks in 2012

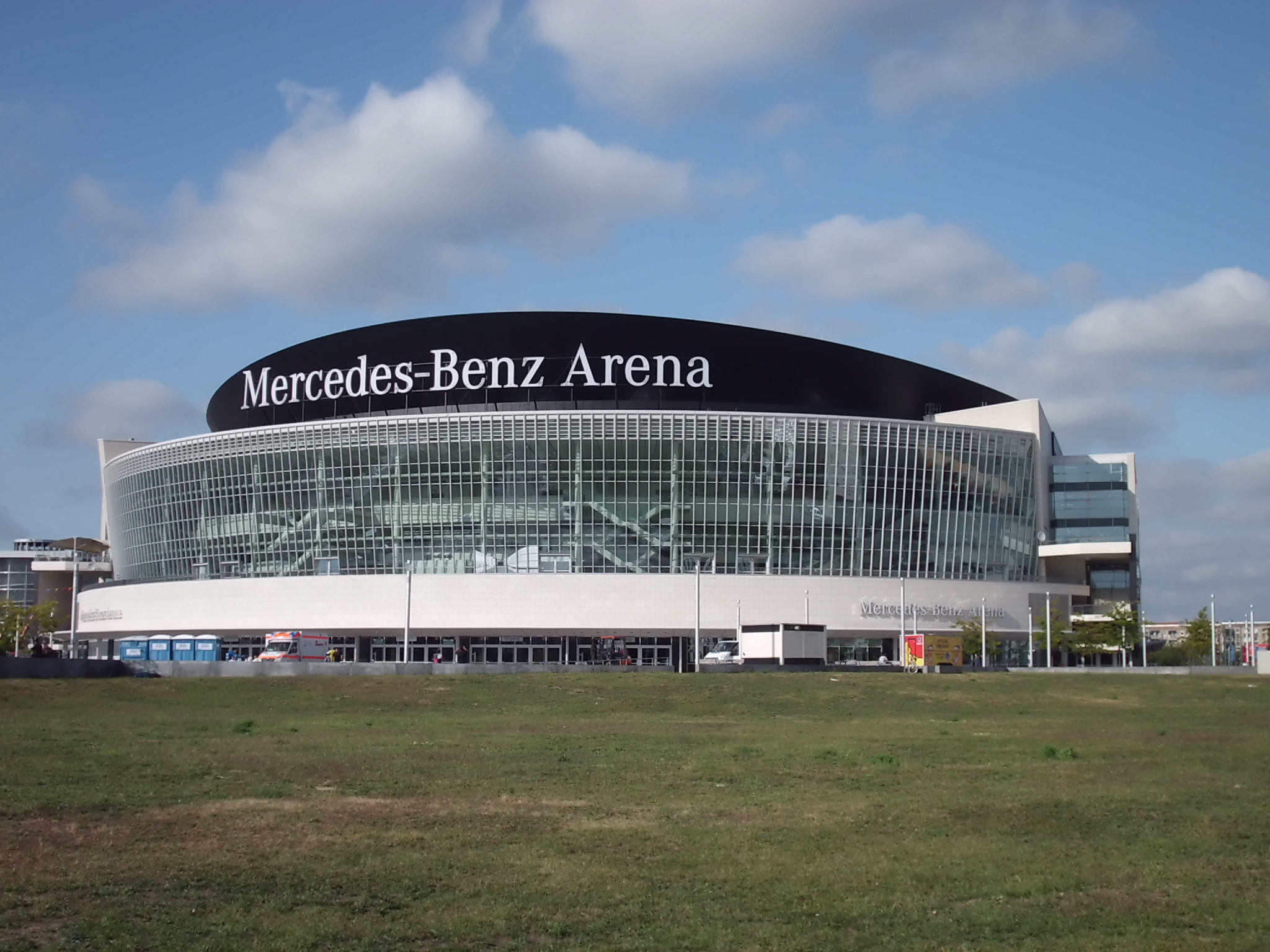
The Mercedes-Benz Arena is the host venue for Alba Berlin

In 2009 and 2015, the manager of Alba Berlin, Marco Baldi, was honored by Euroleague Basketball Company executives with the EuroLeague Executive of the Year Award.

On 8 October 2014, Alba Berlin defeated the defending NBA champion San Antonio Spurs, 94–93, on a buzzer beater by Jamel McLean.

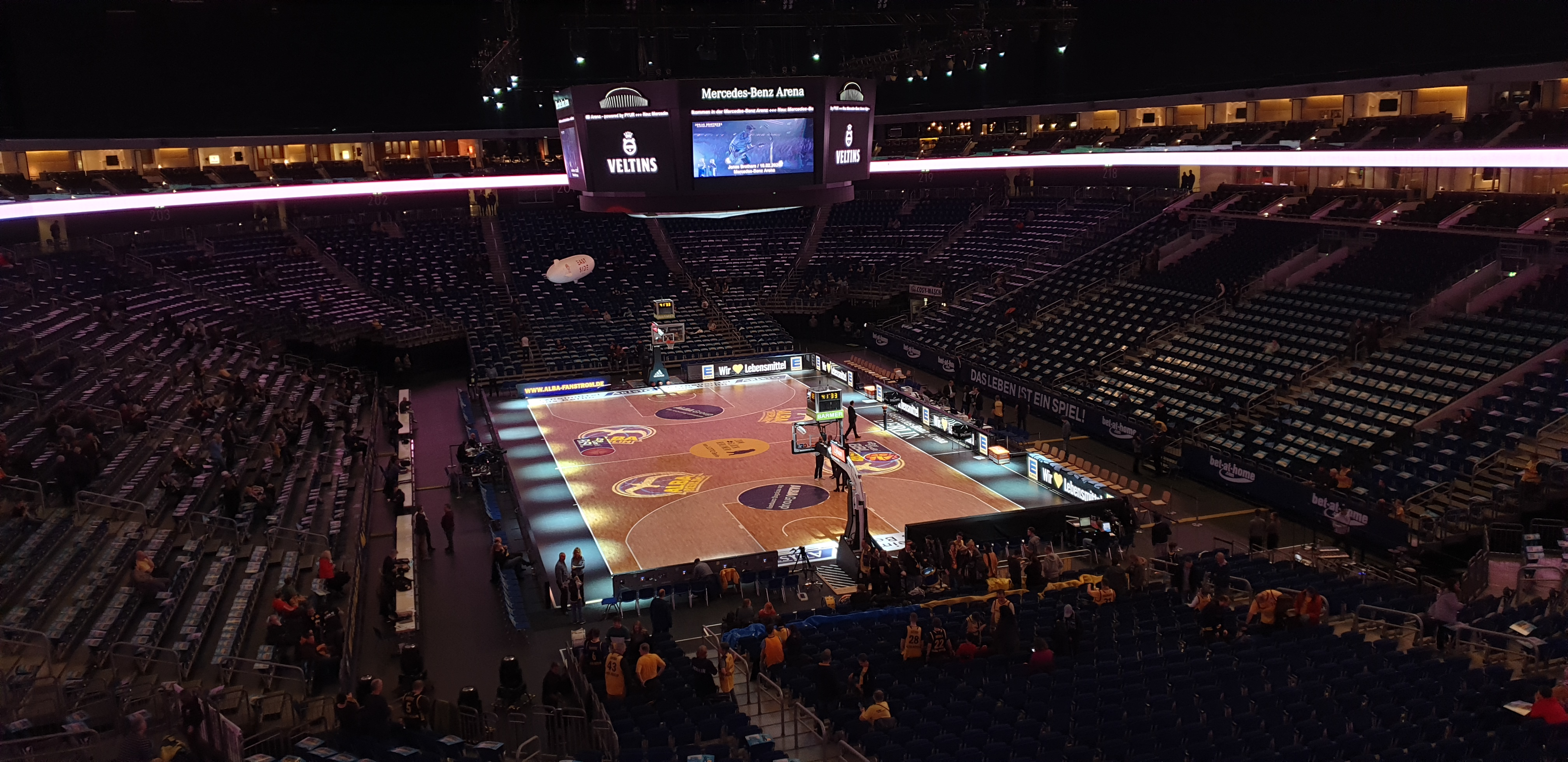
Mercedes-Benz Arena before an Alba Berlin game in 2019

In the 2014–15 season, Alba returned to the EuroLeague and reached the Top 16. In the Bundesliga, the team had another disappointing season: it finished in second place, but was eliminated in the semifinals. In the 2015–16 season, Alba had one of its worst seasons in history as the team managed to finish only in 7th place in the regular season, though Alba won the German Cup. In the playoffs, the team was eliminated in the quarterfinals. In the 2016–17 season, the same thing repeated – a disappointing sixth-place finish in the Bundesliga.

The 2017–2018 season, though Alba returned to the finals, losing only to Bayern Munich. Alba also had one of the better Eurocup campaigns of the past years, being closest it had gotten to the playoffs in years. Alba brought on a lauded veteran for the 2017/18 season, the Spaniard Aíto García Reneses, 70 years old at the time of signing his first contract abroad. He had won nine Spanish championship titles (Spanish Basketball Liga) as well as Olympic silver as a coach (2008). With him a successful Spanish army took over. The 2017 new coaching staff also included other Spaniards such as co-coach Israel González, who had worked with Aito in the past, individual coach Carlos Frade and athletics coach Pepe Silva Moreno. As in the previous course of his coaching work, García Reneses increasingly brought players from the younger teams onto the professional team in Berlin, like Franz Wagner and Tim Schneider.

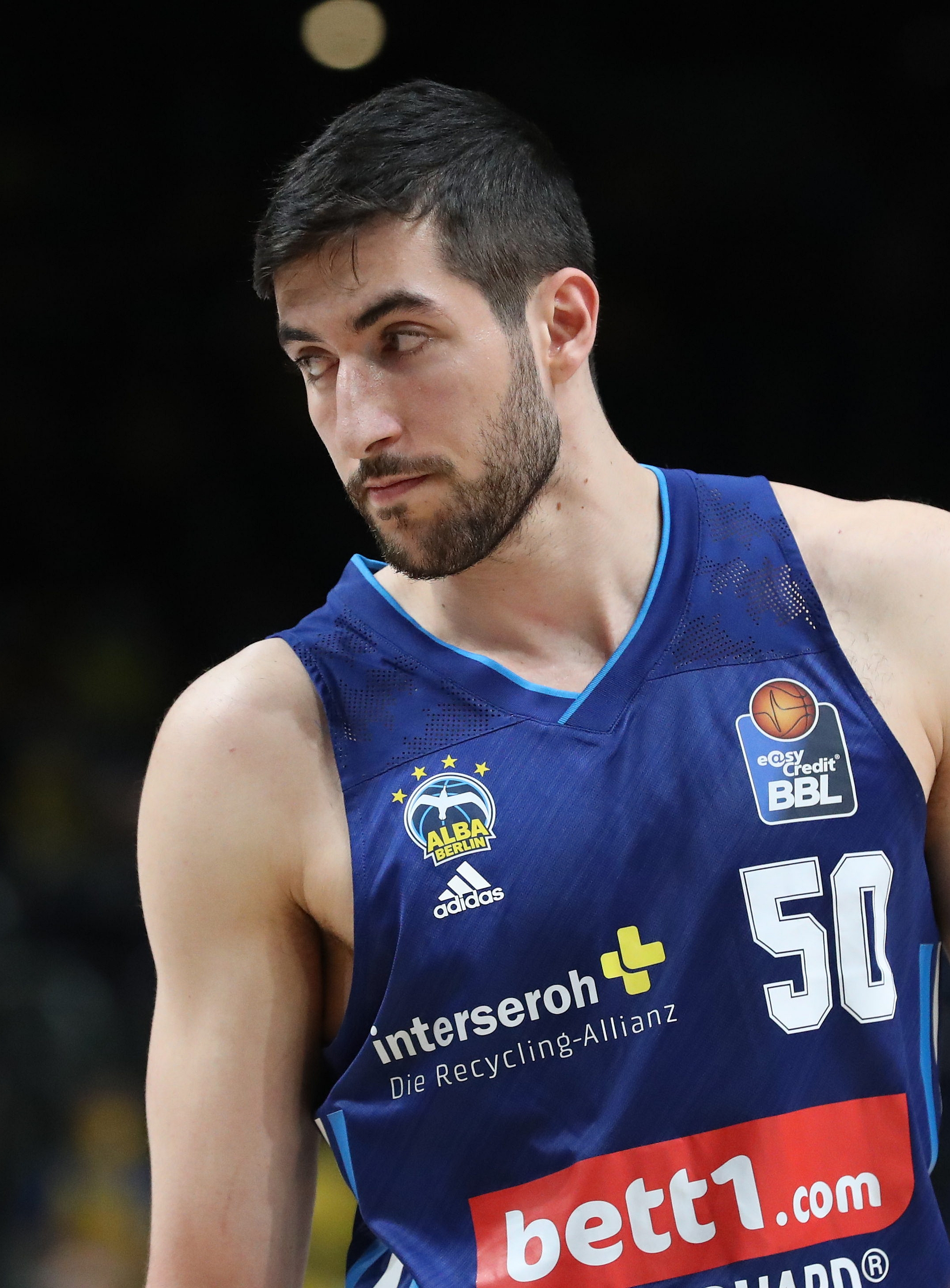
Yovel Zoosman in May 2022

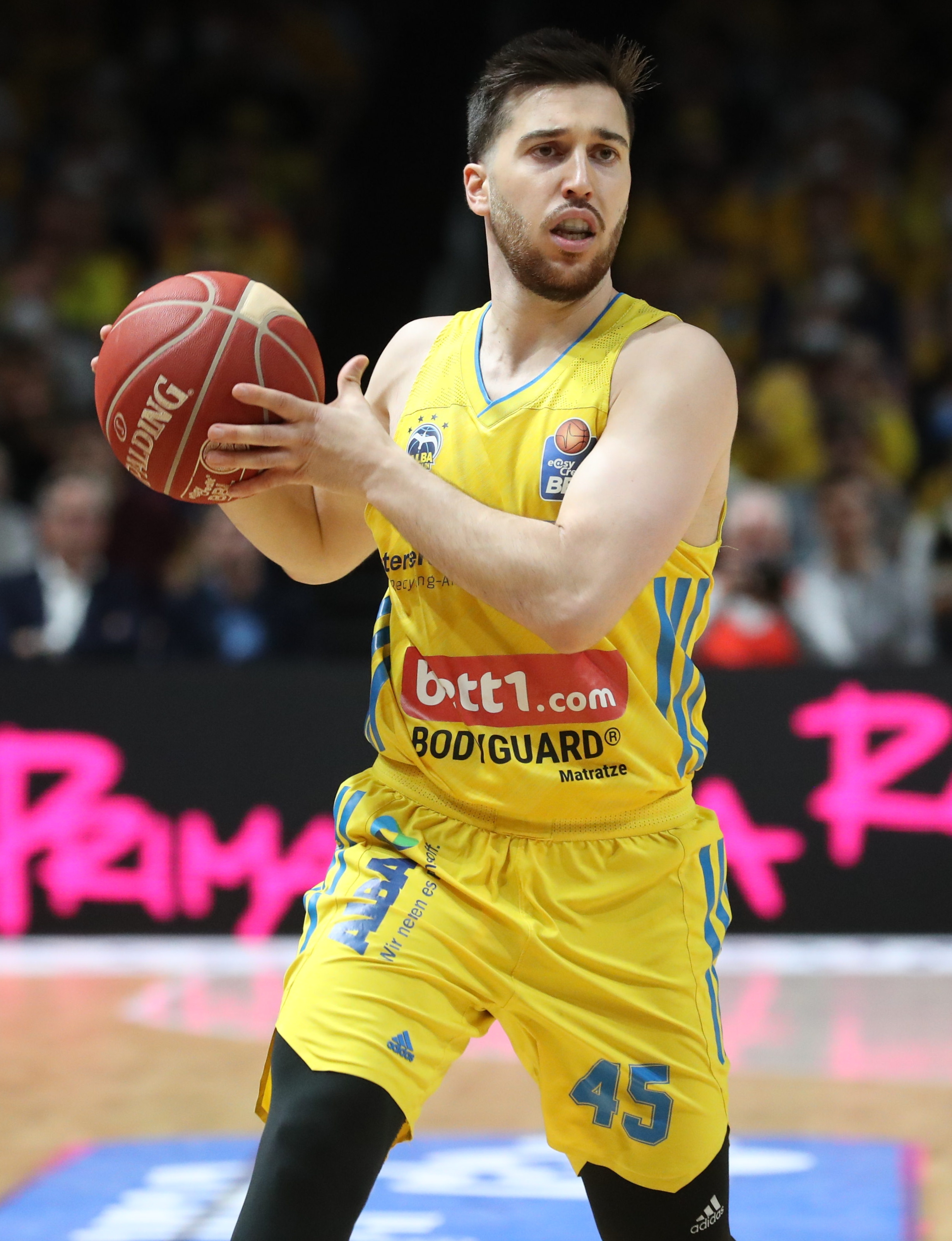
Tamir Blatt, June 2022.

In the 2018–2019 season, Alba had some of its greatest success in more than a decade, as they not only played in the Bundesliga finals for the second year in a row, but also managed to reach the 2019 EuroCup Finals, where they ultimately lost the series 1–2 to Valencia Basket. Two of Alba's players, Rokas Giedraitis, and Luke Sikma (who was also named the league's MVP), were selected to the All-EuroCup First Team, while the team's coach, Aíto García Reneses, was named the Eurocup Coach of the Year. The club also set the season's record for highest attendance, with 12,945 spectators in a finals game against Valencia Basket, which Alba won 95–92.

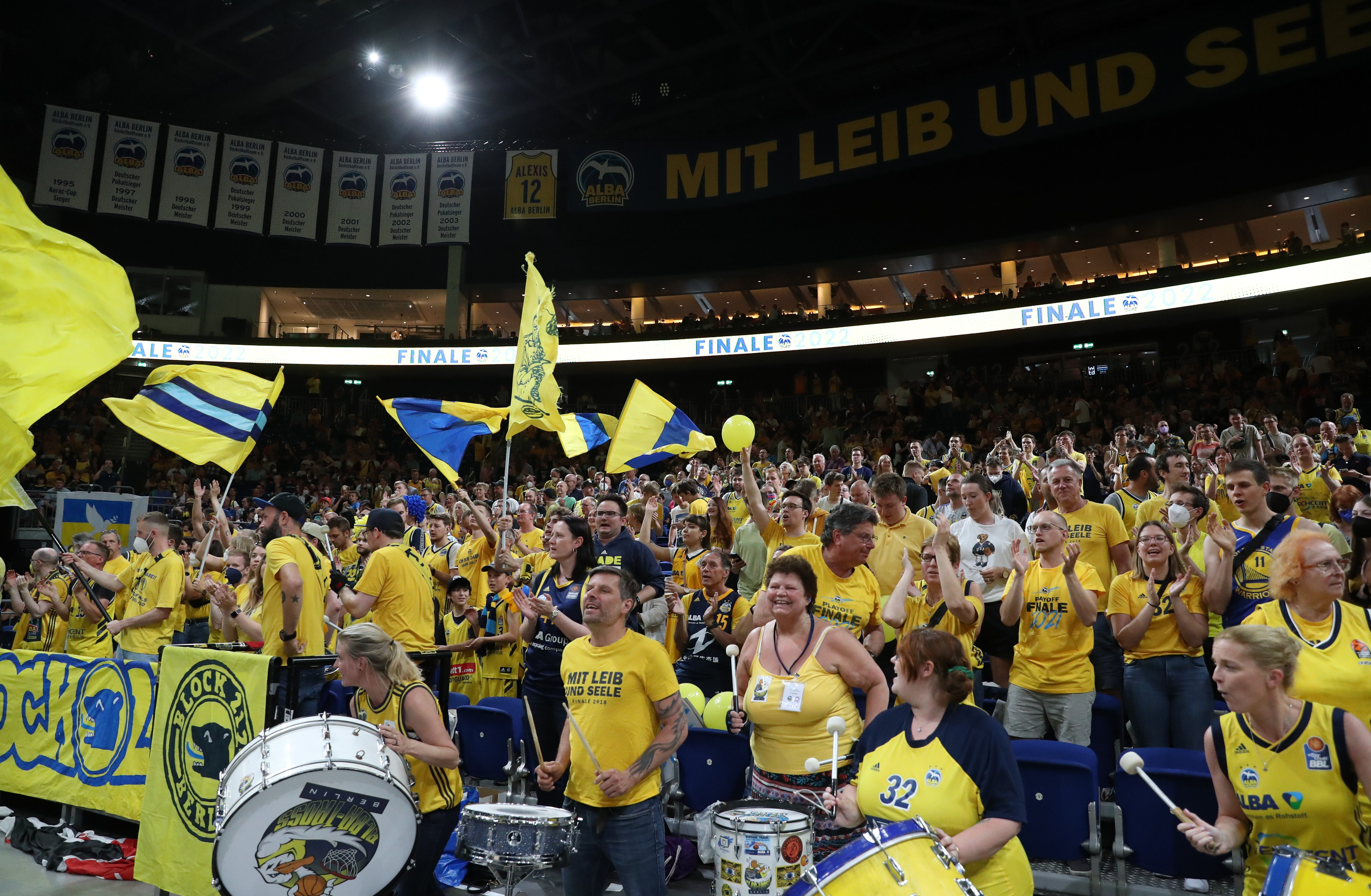
Alba fans in June 2022

The 2019–20 season was altered due to the COVID-19 pandemic. In a final tournament behind closed doors in Munich, Alba went on an undefeated 10–0 streak to win its 9th German title, its first in 12 years. In the 2021–22 season, Alba won the BBL again.

After 24 years, the team decided to join FIBA-run European Basketball Champions League for the following 2025–26 season after participating in Euroleague Basketball's EuroLeague and EuroCup, both of which they played in for 12 seasons.

== Players ==
=== Retired numbers ===
Alba Berlin retired numbers
No	Nat.	Player	Position	Tenure
4	(Germany)	Henrik Rödl	SF	1993–2004
12	(United States)	Wendell Alexis	PF	1996–2002

=== Current roster ===
Note: Flags indicate national team eligibility at FIBA-sanctioned events. Players may hold other non-FIBA nationalities not displayed.

Alba Berlin roster
Players
Coaches

Pos.	No.	Nat.	Name	Ht.	Age
G	3	(United States)	Ford, Jordan	1.85 m (6 ft 1 in)	28 – 26 May 1998
SG	4	(Germany)	Böhmer, Julius	1.93 m (6 ft 4 in)	24 – 19 January 2002
SF	5	(Germany)	Griesel, Sam	2.00 m (6 ft 7 in)	26 – 22 March 2000
G/F	6	(Germany)	Delow, Malte	1.98 m (6 ft 6 in)	25 – 22 April 2001
PG	7	(Germany)	Kayil, Jack	1.93 m (6 ft 4 in)	20 – 27 January 2006
G	9	(Germany)	Mattisseck, Jonas	1.95 m (6 ft 5 in)	26 – 16 January 2000
F	11	(United States)	Wieskamp, Joe	1.98 m (6 ft 6 in)	27 – 23 August 1999
G	15	(Iceland)	Hermannsson, Martin	1.90 m (6 ft 3 in)	32 – 16 September 1994
C	17	(Germany)	Agbakoko, Norris	2.17 m (7 ft 1 in)	26 – 16 January 2000
G	20	(Germany)	Nufer, Anton	1.99 m (6 ft 6 in)	20 – 9 April 2006
F/C	21	(United States)	Angel, Brandon	2.05 m (6 ft 9 in)	25 – 27 October 2001
C	22	(Germany)	Bennefeld, Nevio	2.11 m (6 ft 11 in)	26 – 30 January 2000
F	34	(United States)	Bean, Justin	2.01 m (6 ft 7 in)	29 – 17 November 1996
C	77	(Spain)	Sima, Yankuba	2.11 m (6 ft 11 in)	30 – 28 July 1996

Head coach

- (Spain) Pedro Calles

Assistant coach(es)

- (Germany) Sebastian Trzcionka
- (Germany) Vladimir Bogojević

Legend

- (C) Team captain
- Injured

- Roster
Updated: October 15, 2026

=== Depth chart ===
Pos.	Starting 5	Bench 1	Bench 2
C	Norris Agbakoko	Nevio Bennefeld	Yankuba Sima
PF	Justin Bean	Brandon Angel
SF	Malte Delow	Joe Wieskamp	Anton Nufer
SG	Jonas Mattisseck	Sam Griesel	Julius Böhmer
PG	Jack Kayil	Martin Hermannsson	Jordan Ford

== Season by season ==
Season	Tier	League	Pos.	German Cup	European competitions	
1991–92	1	Bundesliga	2nd		2 European Cup	RS
1992–93	1	Bundesliga	2nd		3 Korać Cup	RS
1993–94	1	Bundesliga	3rd		3 Korać Cup	RS
1994–95	1	Bundesliga	2nd		3 Korać Cup	C
1995–96	1	Bundesliga	2nd	Semi-finalist	3 Korać Cup	QF
1996–97	1	Bundesliga	1st	Champion	1 Euroleague	RS
1997–98	1	Bundesliga	1st		1 Euroleague	QF
1998–99	1	Bundesliga	1st	Champion	1 Euroleague	RS
1999–00	1	Bundesliga	1st	Runner-up	1 Euroleague	RS
2000–01	1	Bundesliga	1st		1 SuproLeague	QF
2001–02	1	Bundesliga	1st	Champion	1 Euroleague	RS
2002–03	1	Bundesliga	1st	Champion	1 Euroleague	RS
2003–04	1	Bundesliga	3rd		1 Euroleague	RS
2004–05	1	Bundesliga	3rd		2 ULEB Cup	RS
2005–06	1	Bundesliga	2nd	Champion	2 ULEB Cup	RS
2006–07	1	Bundesliga	5th		2 ULEB Cup	RS
2007–08	1	Bundesliga	1st	Fourth place	2 ULEB Cup	RS
2008–09	1	Bundesliga	3rd	Champion	1 Euroleague	T16
2009–10	1	Bundesliga	6th	Quarter-finalist	1 Euroleague	QR2
2009–10	1	Bundesliga	6th	Quarter-finalist	2 Eurocup	RU
2010–11	1	Bundesliga	2nd	Quarter-finalist	1 Euroleague	QR3
2010–11	1	Bundesliga	2nd	Quarter-finalist	2 Eurocup	RS
2011–12	1	Bundesliga	5th	Quarter-finalist	1 Euroleague	QR2
2011–12	1	Bundesliga	5th	Quarter-finalist	2 Eurocup	RS
2012–13	1	Bundesliga	5th	Champion	1 Euroleague	T16
2013–14	1	Bundesliga	2nd	Champion	2 Eurocup	QF
2014–15	1	Bundesliga	3rd	Third place	1 Euroleague	T16
2015–16	1	Bundesliga	7th	Champion	2 Eurocup	T16
2016–17	1	Bundesliga	6th	Third place	2 EuroCup	T16
2017–18	1	Bundesliga	2nd	Runner-up	2 EuroCup	T16
2018–19	1	Bundesliga	2nd	Runner-up	2 EuroCup	RU
2019–20	1	Bundesliga	1st	Champion	1 EuroLeague	CX
2020–21	1	Bundesliga	1st	Runner-up	1 EuroLeague	RS
2021–22	1	Bundesliga	1st	Champion	1 EuroLeague	RS
2022–23	1	Bundesliga	5th	Semi-finalist	1 EuroLeague	RS
2023–24	1	Bundesliga	2nd	Semi-finalist	1 EuroLeague	RS
2024–25	1	Bundesliga	7th	Quarter-finalist	1 EuroLeague	RS
2025–26	1	Bundesliga	1st	Runner-up	Champions League	QF
2026–27	1	Bundesliga			Champions League	

== Honours ==
Total Titles: 26

=== Domestic competitions ===
- German League (12)

Winners: 1996–97, 1997–98, 1998–99, 1999–00, 2000–01, 2001–02, 2002–03, 2007–08, 2019–20, 2020–21, 2021–22, 2025–26

- German Cup (11)

Winners: 1996–97, 1998–99, 2001–02, 2002–03, 2005–06, 2008–09, 2012–13, 2013–14, 2015–16, 2019–20, 2021–22

- German Supercup (3)

Winners: 2008, 2013, 2014

=== European competitions ===
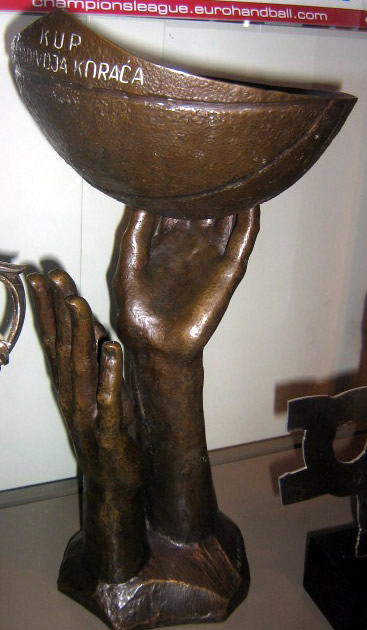
Korać Cup

- FIBA Korać Cup (1)

Winners: 1994–95

- EuroCup

Runners-up: 2009–10, 2018–19

=== Other competitions ===
- Zadar Basketball Tournament

Runners-up: 2019

- Berlin, Germany Invitational Game

Winners: 2010

- Zielona Gora, Poland Invitational Game

Winners: 2015

- Torneo EncestaRias

Winners: 2018

- Trofeo Alava

Runners-up: 2018

- Clermont-Ferrand, France Invitational Game

Winners: 2019

- Oranienburg, Germany Invitational Game

Winners: 2019

== Games against NBA teams ==
6 October 2012

Alba Berlin (Germany)	84–89	(United States) Dallas Mavericks

O2 World, Berlin
Attendance: 14.504

8 October 2014

Alba Berlin (Germany)	94–93	(United States) San Antonio Spurs

O2 World, Berlin
Attendance: 14.504

== The road to 1995 FIBA Korać Cup victory ==
Round	Opponent club	Home	Away
2nd	(Hungary) ZTE	79–59	76–60
Top 32	(France) JDA Dijon	106–88	81–72
Top 16	(France) Pau-Orthez	82–101	80–78
Top 16	(Italy) Birex Verona	76–66	74–87
Top 16	(Spain) Estudiantes Argentaria	107–80	63–65
QF	(Italy) Filodoro Bologna	77–73	80–80
SF	(Spain) Cáceres	93–70	74–72
F	(Italy) Stefanel Milano	85–79	87–87

== Hall of Fame ==
=== Notable players ===
Note: Flags indicate national team eligibility at FIBA-sanctioned events. Players may hold other non-FIBA nationalities not displayed.

Criteria

To appear in this section a player must have either:

- Set a club record or won an individual award while at the club
- Played at least one official international match for their national team at any time
- Played at least one official NBA match at any time.

German:

- (Germany) İsmet Akpınar
- (Germany) Stephen Arigbabu
- (Germany) Stephan Baeck
- (Germany) Uwe Blab
- (Germany) (Turkey) Mithat Demirel
- (Germany) Patrick Femerling
- (Germany) Stefano "Nino" Garris
- (Germany) Hansi Gnad
- (Germany) Demond Greene
- (Germany) Henning Harnisch
- (Germany) Johannes Herber
- (Germany) Jörg Lütcke
- (Germany) (Nigeria) Ademola Okulaja
- (Germany) (Serbia) Marko Pešić
- (Germany) Henrik Rödl
- (Germany) Heiko Schaffartzik
- (Germany) Sven Schultze
- (Germany) Akeem Vargas
- (Germany) Franz Wagner
- (Germany) Moritz Wagner
- (Germany) Christian Welp

Europe & Rest of the World:

- (Serbia) Vule Avdalović
- (Serbia) Saša Obradović
- (Serbia) Tadija Dragićević
- (Serbia) Dejan Koturović
- (Serbia) (Greece) Vladimir Petrović-Stergiou
- (Serbia) Zoran Radović
- (Serbia) Miroslav Raduljica
- (Serbia) Jovo Stanojević
- (Montenegro) Goran Jeretin
- (Montenegro) Goran Nikolić
- (Montenegro) Blagota Sekulić
- (Croatia) Matej Mamić
- (Slovenia) Teoman Alibegović
- (North Macedonia) Vojdan Stojanovski
- (Netherlands) Geert Hammink
- (Lithuania) Martynas Mažeika
- (Lithuania) Marius Grigonis
- (Lithuania) Rokas Giedraitis
- (Estonia) Tanel Tein
- (Iceland) Martin Hermannsson
- (Poland) Szymon Szewczyk
- (Czech Republic) Jiří Zídek, Jr.
- (Russia) Vasily Karasev
- (Israel) Tamir Blatt
- (Israel) Bar Timor
- (Israel) Yovel Zoosman
- (Cameroon) Ruben Boumtje-Boumtje
- (New Zealand) Kirk Penney

North American:

- (United States) (Croatia) Jaleen Smith
- (United States) Wendell Alexis
- (United States) William Avery
- (United States) Michael Bradley
- (United States) Bobby Brown
- (United States) Tyler Cavanaugh
- (United States) John Celestand
- (United States) Will Cherry
- (United States) Terry Dehere
- (United States) Sharrod Ford
- (United States) Kiwane Garris
- (United States) Julius Jenkins
- (United States) Immanuel McElroy
- (United States) Chris Owens
- (United States) Mike Penberthy
- (United States) Derrick Phelps
- (United States) Hollis Price
- (United States) Kevin Rankin
- (United States) (Montenegro) Taylor Rochestie
- (United States) Luke Sikma
- (United States) Peyton Siva
- (United States) Dijon Thompson
- (United States) Luke Whitehead
- (United States) Mike Whitmarsh
- (United States) Michael Wright

== Head coaches ==
- (Federal Republic of Yugoslavia) Svetislav Pešić: (1993–2000)
- (Bosnia and Herzegovina) Emir Mutapčić: (2000–2005)
- (Germany) Henrik Rödl: (2005–2007)
- (Serbia) Luka Pavićević: (2007–2011)
- (Israel) Muli Katzurin: (2011)
- (Canada) Gordon Herbert: (2011–2012)
- (Serbia) Saša Obradović: (2012–2016)
- (Turkey) Ahmet Çakı: (2016–2017)
- (Spain) Aíto García Reneses: (2017–2021)
- (Spain) Israel González: (2021–2025)
- (Spain) Pedro Calles: (2025–present)

== Home arenas ==
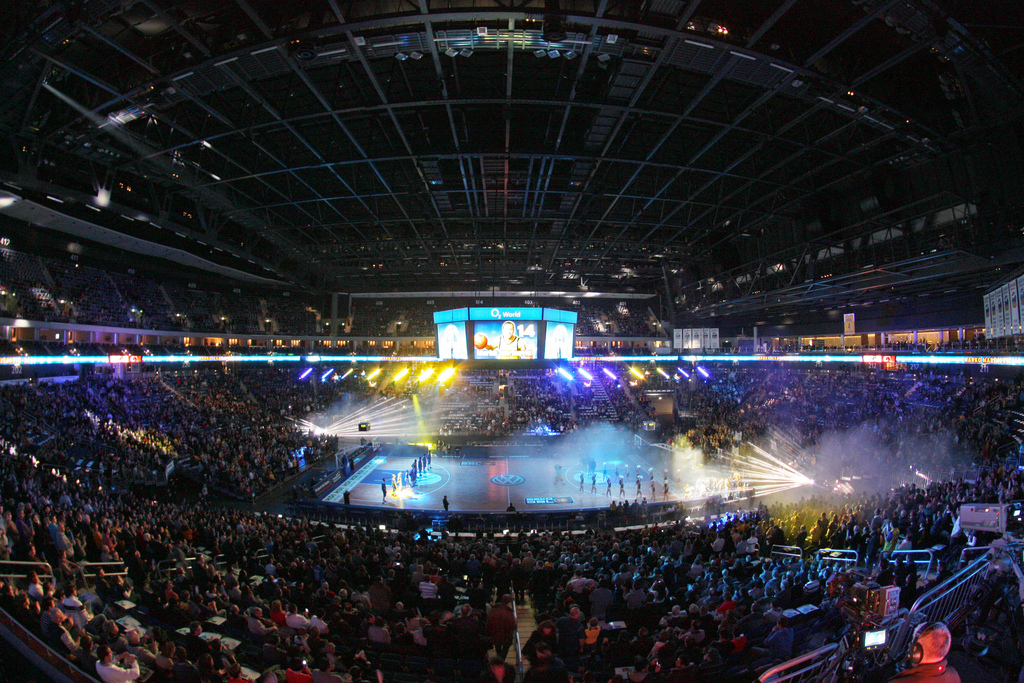
Alba Berlin's home games at Mercedes-Benz Arena (formerly O_{2} World) are among the most attended of any European basketball club.

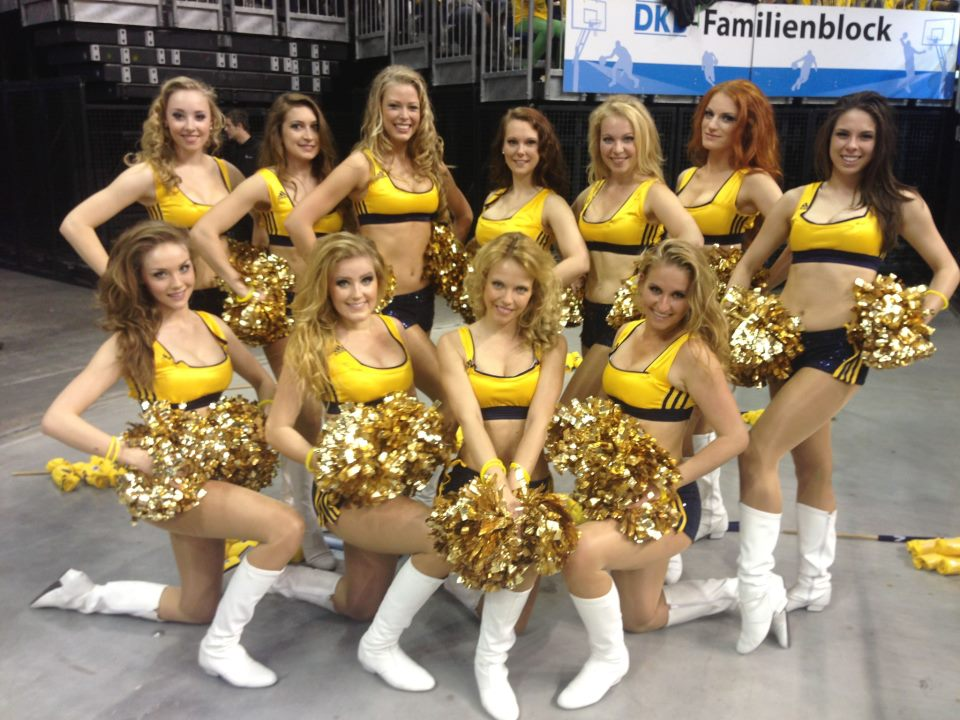
Alba Dancers in 2013

- Sömmeringhalle: (1991–1996)
- Deutschlandhalle: (1995), used only once, for the FIBA Korać Cup Final
- Max-Schmeling-Halle: (1996–2008)
- Uber Arena: (2008–present)

== Sponsorships ==
Name sponsor	(Germany) ALBA SE
Main partner and shirt sponsor	(Germany) Cazoo
Shirt sponsor	(Germany) bett1
Sport clothing manufacturer	(Germany) Adidas AG

== See also ==
- 2012 NBA Europe Live Tour
