= 2025–26 Basketball Bundesliga =

Basketball Bundesliga
- Season: 2025–26
- Dates: 26 September 2025 – June 2026
- Teams: 18

Regular season
- Top seed: Bayern Munich
- Season MVP: Andreas Obst (Bayern Munich)
- Relegated: Basketball Löwen Braunschweig; MLP Academics Heidelberg

Finals
- Champions: Alba Berlin
- Runners-up: Bayern Munich
- Semi-finalists: Telekom Baskets Bonn; Bamberg Baskets

Seasons
- ← 2024–25 2026–27 →

The 2025–26 Basketball Bundesliga, known as the easyCredit BBL for sponsorship reasons, is the 60th season of the Basketball Bundesliga (BBL), the top-tier level of professional club basketball in Germany. It runs from 26 September 2025 to June 2026.

After three years with using the percentage system for the standings, the league reverted to the points system.

Alba Berlin won their 12th title with a finals win over Bayern Munich.

== Format ==
After a double round-robin, the top six teams from the regular season qualiied for the playoffs. Teams placed seven to ten entered into a play-in tournament for the final two seeds of the playoffs.

== Teams ==
Location of teams in 2025–26 Basketball Bundesliga

=== Team changes ===
Promoted from 2024–25 ProA	Relegated from 2024–25 Basketball Bundesliga
Science City Jena; Gladiators Trier	BG Göttingen

=== Arenas and locations ===
Team	City	Arena	Capacity
Bamberg Baskets	Bamberg	Brose Arena	6,150
Alba Berlin	Berlin	Uber Arena	14,500
Telekom Baskets Bonn	Bonn	Telekom Dome	6,000
Löwen Braunschweig	Braunschweig	Volkswagen Halle	6,600
Niners Chemnitz	Chemnitz	Chemnitz Arena	5,200
Skyliners Frankfurt	Frankfurt	Süwag Energie ARENA	5,002
Veolia Towers Hamburg	Hamburg	Inselpark Arena	3,400
Veolia Towers Hamburg	Hamburg	Barclays Arena (2 Games)	13,000
MLP Academics Heidelberg	Heidelberg	SNP Dome	5,000
Science City Jena	Jena	Sparkassen-Arena	3,000
MHP Riesen Ludwigsburg	Ludwigsburg	MHP-Arena	5,300
Syntainics MBC	Weißenfels	Stadthalle Weißenfels	3,000
Bayern Munich	Munich	BMW Park	6,700
EWE Baskets Oldenburg	Oldenburg	Große EWE Arena	6,069
Rostock Seawolves	Rostock	Stadthalle Rostock	4,550
Vet-Concept Gladiators Trier	Trier	SWT-Arena	5,495
ratiopharm Ulm	Neu-Ulm	ratiopharm arena	6,000
Rasta Vechta	Vechta	Rasta Dome	3,140
Fitness First Würzburg Baskets	Würzburg	Tectake Arena	3,140

== Regular season ==
=== Standings ===
Pos	Team	Pld	W	L	PF	PA	PD	Pts	Qualification or relegation
1	Bayern Munich	34	29	5	2980	2530	+450	58	Playoffs
2	Alba Berlin	34	24	10	2918	2648	+270	48 (Note: Alba Berlin 4 Pts; Bamberg Baskets 0 Pts.)	Playoffs
3	Bamberg Baskets	34	24	10	3055	2777	+278	48	Playoffs
4	Telekom Baskets Bonn	34	21	13	2853	2731	+122	42	Playoffs
5	Fitness First Würzburg Baskets	34	20	14	2780	2727	+53	40	Playoffs
6	Ratiopharm Ulm	34	19	15	2817	2665	+152	38	Playoffs
7	Rasta Vechta	34	17	17	3064	3009	+55	34 (Note: Rasta Vechta 8 Pts, + 34 PD; Vet-Concept Gladiators Trier 8 Pts, 0 PD; Rostock Seawolves 6 Pts; Riesen Ludwigsburg 2 Pts.)	Play-in
8	Vet-Concept Gladiators Trier	34	17	17	3073	3171	−98	34	Play-in
9	Rostock Seawolves	34	17	17	2849	2796	+53	34	Play-in
10	MHP Riesen Ludwigsburg	34	17	17	2801	2786	+15	34	Play-in
11	EWE Baskets Oldenburg	34	16	18	2826	2866	−40	32 (Note: Baskets Oldenburg 2 Pts, +7 PD; Niners Chemnitz 2 Pts, −7 PD.)	
12	Niners Chemnitz	34	16	18	2839	2913	−74	32	
13	Syntainics MBC	34	13	21	2874	2965	−91	26 (Note: Mitteldeutscher BC 4 Pts; Veolia Towers Hamburg 0 Pts.)	
14	Veolia Towers Hamburg	34	13	21	2881	3004	−123	26	
15	Skyliners Frankfurt	34	12	22	2750	2928	−178	24 (Note: Skyliners Frankfurt 4 Pts; Science City Jena 0 Pts.)	
16	Science City Jena	34	12	22	2756	3084	−328	24	
17	Basketball Löwen Braunschweig (R)	34	10	24	2821	3070	−249	20	Relegation to ProA
18	MLP Academics Heidelberg (R)	34	9	25	2676	2943	−267	18	Relegation to ProA

Source: BBL
Rules for classification: 1) points; 2) head-to-head points; 3) head-to-head points difference; 4) head-to-head number of points scored.
(R) Relegated

=== Results ===
Home \ Away	BAM	BER	BON	BRA	CHE	FRA	HAM	HEI	JEN	LUD	MBC	MUN	OLD	ROS	TRI	ULM	VEC	WUR
Bamberg Baskets	—	92–98	102–83	88–81	96–82	77–80	85–71	80–69	81–75	79–100	99–74	97–93	83–61	74–87	98–79	83–106	96–86	92–86
Alba Berlin	87–82	—	91–75	104–73	82–84	89–83	87–93	87–62	83–65	80–47	88–80	67–61	79–81	89–85	92–97	66–67	84–82	71–68
Telekom Baskets Bonn	76–74	70–84	—	96–85	86–82	88–76	92–85	94–82	92–64	79–81	88–72	55–83	73–71	77–81	102–77	81–79	101–83	61–72
Basketball Löwen Braunschweig	75–98	73–94	89–80	—	104–90	73–95	85–73	94–99	78–83	98–97	112–93	62–91	68–93	92–71	97–106	77–67	98–77	82–87
Niners Chemnitz	62–89	85–89	75–76	93–75	—	86–82	102–78	99–96	76–73	111–88	79–75	59–87	95–85	97–92	96–84	79–66	90–96	67–86
Skyliners Frankfurt	61–84	61–87	72–104	87–90	89–86	—	78–82	73–93	79–70	88–98	93–97	69–97	73–79	97–74	108–115	64–103	89–93	82–80
Veolia Towers Hamburg	71–101	99–80	68–86	95–85	86–69	97–75	—	86–83	82–84	84–88	85–93	96–81	69–94	91–86	90–72	84–82	83–92	73–90
MLP Academics Heidelberg	85–99	54–87	67–100	95–75	83–90	75–80	108–111	—	83–87	73–83	80–75	63–106	80–78	70–101	76–80	93–90	89–103	85–51
Science City Jena	81–102	78–97	80–92	82–93	85–72	58–90	106–95	81–79	—	75–84	84–108	61–106	97–75	82–89	102–94	70–92	95–78	69–87
MHP Riesen Ludwigsburg	74–86	77–101	85–86	86–62	87–79	97–65	75–67	89–73	91–82	—	86–82	78–86	65–59	75–61	80–86	90–81	80–86	79–84
Syntainics MBC	82–99	99–68	84–77	99–93	90–94	83–96	99–94	85–67	86–95	82–93	—	91–79	84–90	80–94	84–110	75–71	90–82	83–52
Bayern Munich	96–81	85–79	66–63	98–80	91–77	85–76	96–79	93–81	93–77	93–59	83–62	—	77–67	86–64	94–83	62–79	90–88	98–79
EWE Baskets Oldenburg	89–103	76–73	98–94	93–84	89–72	75–89	77–96	94–74	92–95	102–88	91–84	79–87	—	81–79	108–85	86–93	70–91	79–85
Rostock Seawolves	86–88	66–80	86–88	98–78	73–78	82–77	103–71	90–79	89–79	96–89	84–77	67–85	94–77	—	118–103	68–75	87–91	77–74
Vet-Concept Gladiators Trier	92–87	92–99	102–98	78–73	100–105	89–84	101–92	69–71	94–95	92–76	85–78	80–104	95–98	88–78	—	100–89	96–87	102–90
Ratiopharm Ulm	73–89	77–89	84–77	72–59	94–81	67–75	81–72	77–79	93–90	93–76	104–81	77–81	101–72	87–80	97–67	—	77–74	66–61
Rasta Vechta	96–93	83–95	70–76	120–98	80–78	95–98	97–95	86–76	101–64	121–102	83–96	74–77	79–96	78–90	123–97	85–73	—	100–104
Fitness First Würzburg Baskets	80–98	96–92	81–87	92–80	81–69	80–66	91–88	70–54	97–92	75–58	89–71	81–90	82–71	63–75	102–83	98–84	86–103	—

Source: BBL
Legend: Blue = home team win; Red = away team win.

== Playoffs ==
=== Play-in tournament ===
Only the top six seeds advanced directly to the playoffs, while the next four seeds participated in a play-in tournament. The seventh place team hosted the eighth place team in the double-chance round needing to win one game to advance, with the winner clinching the seventh seed in the playoffs. The ninth place team hosted the tenth place team in the elimination round requiring two wins to advance, with the loser being eliminated from the competition. The loser in the double-chance round hosted the elimination-round game-winner, with the winner clinching the eighth seed and the loser being eliminated. The games were played on 11 and 13 May 2025.

Play-in games
7	Rasta Vechta	111
8	Vet-Concept Gladiators Trier	83
9	Rostock Seawolves	91
10	MHP Riesen Ludwigsburg	71

No. 8 seed game
8	Vet-Concept Gladiators Trier	76
9	Rostock Seawolves	69

Final seeds
Rasta Vechta	No. 7 seed
Vet-Concept Gladiators Trier	No. 8 seed

Bold Game winner

=== Bracket ===
The rounds will be played in a best-of-five format.

Quarterfinals
1	Bayern Munich	3
8	Vet-Concept Gladiators Trier	0
4	Telekom Baskets Bonn	3
5	Fitness First Würzburg Baskets	2
2	Alba Berlin	3
7	Rasta Vechta	2
3	Bamberg Baskets	3
6	Ratiopharm Ulm	0

Semifinals
1	Bayern Munich	3
4	Telekom Baskets Bonn	0
2	Alba Berlin	3
3	Bamberg Baskets	2

Finals
1	Bayern Munich	2
2	Alba Berlin	3

== Awards and statistics ==
=== Major award winners ===
The awards were announced in May 2026.

Award	Player	Club
Most Valuable Player	(Germany) Andreas Obst	Bayern Munich
Finals MVP	(United States) Justin Bean	Alba Berlin
Top Scorer	(United States) Chris Clemons	Baskets Oldenburg
Best Offensive Player	(United States) Jordan Roland	Vet-Concept Gladiators Trier
Best Defender	(United States) EJ Onu	Bamberg Baskets
Most Effective Player International	(United States) Jaedon LeDee	Skyliners Frankfurt
Most Effective Player National	(Germany) Kevin Yebo	Niners Chemnitz
Best German Young Player	(Germany) Jack Kayil	Alba Berlin
Coach of the Year	(Slovakia) Anton Gavel	Bamberg Baskets

=== Statistical leaders ===
Category	Player	Club	Average
Points per game	(United States) Chris Clemons	Baskets Oldenburg	18.5
Rebounds per game	(United States) Jaedon LeDee	Skyliners Frankfurt	9.5
Assists per game	(United States) Jack Pagenkopf (United States) Alonzo Verge Jr.	Science City Jena; Rasta Vechta	6.5
Steals per game	(United States) Grayson Murphy	Telekom Baskets Bonn	1.9
Blocks per game	(United States) EJ Onu	Bamberg Baskets	2.4
Efficiency per game	(United States) Jaedon LeDee	Skyliners Frankfurt	20.2

== German clubs in European competitions ==
Team	Competition	Result
Bayern Munich	EuroLeague	Regular season
Niners Chemnitz	EuroCup	Eighthfinals
ratiopharm Ulm	EuroCup	Regular season
Hamburg Towers	EuroCup	Regular season
Alba Berlin	Champions League	Quarterfinals
MLP Academics Heidelberg	Champions League	Play-ins
Fitness First Würzburg Baskets	Champions League	Round of 16
Löwen Braunschweig	Champions League	Qualifying
Löwen Braunschweig	FIBA Europe Cup	Regular season
Rasta Vechta	FIBA Europe Cup	Regular season
Rostock Seawolves	FIBA Europe Cup	Second round

== German clubs in Regional competitions ==
Team	Competition	Progress
Mitteldeutscher BC	European North Basketball League	Third place

== Attendances ==
=== Home games and overall ===
As of 16 July 2026

Pos.	Team	Regular season			Play-in and playoffs			Overall			2024–25 average	Change
Pos.	Team	Matches	Attendance	Average	Matches	Attendance	Average	Matches	Total	Average	2024–25 average	Change
1	ALBA Berlin	17	146,471	8,616	8	64,936	8,117	25	211,407	8,456	8,139	+3.9%
2	FC Bayern Munich	17	109,685	6,452	7	71,584	10,226	24	181,269	7,553	8,317	−9.2%
3	Telekom Baskets Bonn	17	110,008	6,471	4	23,662	5,916	21	133,670	6,365	5,830	+9.2%
4	EWE Baskets Oldenburg	17	106,345	6,256	0	—	—	17	106,345	6,256	6,200	+0.9%
5	Ratiopharm Ulm	17	94,927	5,584	1	5,798	5,798	18	100,725	5,596	5,796	−3.4%
6	VET-CONCEPT Gladiators Trier	17	90,964	5,351	2	10,800	5,400	19	101,764	5,356	—	—
7	BMA365 Bamberg Baskets	17	86,625	5,096	4	22,346	5,587	21	108,971	5,189	4,651	+11.6%
8	MLP Academics Heidelberg	17	78,368	4,610	0	—	—	17	78,368	4,610	4,806	−4.1%
9	NINERS Chemnitz	17	78,230	4,602	0	—	—	17	78,230	4,602	4,796	−4.0%
10	SKYLINERS	17	73,456	4,321	0	—	—	17	73,456	4,321	4,361	−0.9%
11	Basketball Löwen Braunschweig	17	71,603	4,212	0	—	—	17	71,603	4,212	4,723	−10.8%
12	ROSTOCK SEAWOLVES	17	69,909	4,112	1	2,859	2,859	18	72,768	4,043	4,354	−7.2%
13	MHP RIESEN Ludwigsburg	17	66,433	3,908	0	—	—	17	66,433	3,908	3,796	+3.0%
14	Veolia Towers Hamburg	17	65,356	3,844	0	—	—	17	65,356	3,844	3,830	+0.4%
15	SC RASTA Vechta	17	53,198	3,129	3	9,226	3,075	20	62,424	3,121	3,126	−0.2%
16	Fitness First Würzburg Baskets	17	52,804	3,106	2	5,994	2,997	19	58,798	3,095	3,061	+1.1%
17	Science City Jena	17	49,300	2,900	0	—	—	17	49,300	2,900	—	—
18	SYNTAINICS MBC	17	47,394	2,788	0	—	—	17	47,394	2,788	2,600	+7.2%
League total		306	1,451,076	4,742	32	217,205	6,788	338	1,668,281	4,936	4,857	+1.6%

Sources: easyCredit BBL regular season, Sport.de regular season, Sport.de play-in and playoffs, 2024–25 regular season and 2024–25 playoffs. The change is calculated by comparing the 2025–26 overall average with the 2024–25 overall average. The dash indicates that the team did not participate in the postseason or, in the cases of VET-CONCEPT Gladiators Trier and Science City Jena, did not participate in the 2024–25 Basketball Bundesliga season.
