= Jordan Roland =

American basketball player (born 1997)

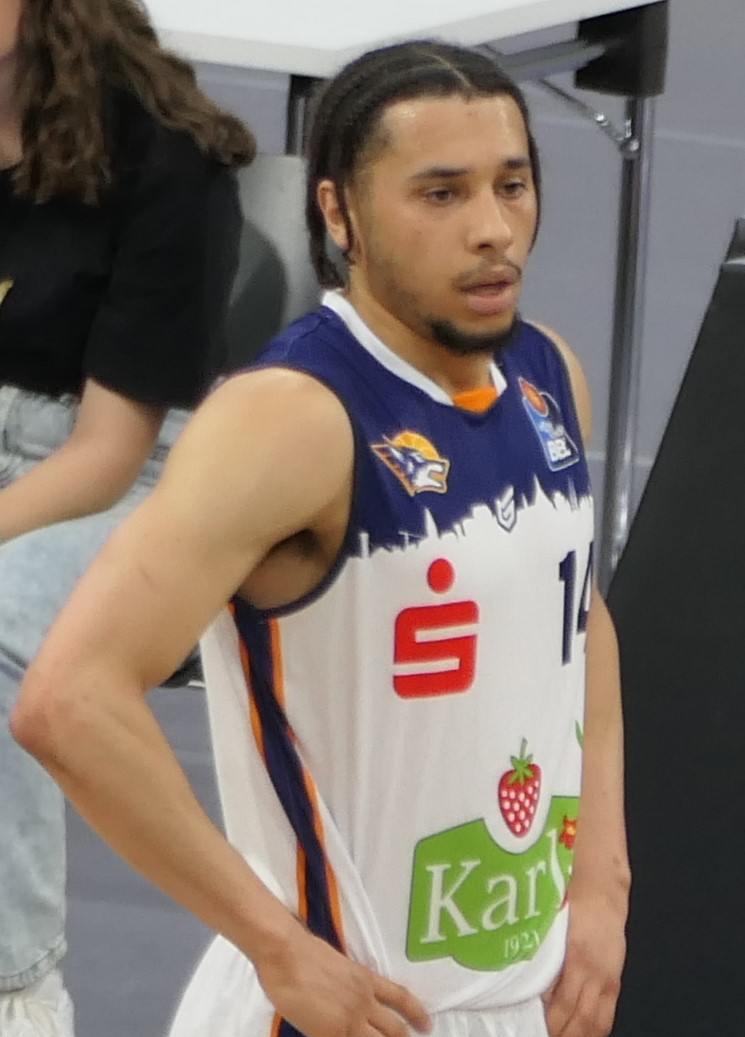
- Roland with Rostock in 2023

No. 15 – Gladiators Trier
- Position: Point guard
- League: Basketball Bundesliga

Personal information
- Born: January 15, 1997 (age 29) Syracuse, New York, U.S.
- Listed height: 6 ft 1 in (1.85 m)
- Listed weight: 171 lb (78 kg)

Career information
- High school: Westhill (Syracuse, New York)
- College: George Washington (2015–2017); Northeastern (2018–2020)
- NBA draft: 2020: undrafted

Career history
- 2021: Valur
- 2021–2023: Rostock Seawolves
- 2024–present: Gladiators Trier

Career highlights
- Bundesliga Best Offensive Player (2026); ProA champion (2022); First-team All-CAA (2020); Third-team All-CAA (2019)

Jordan Jamal Roland (born January 15, 1997) is an American basketball player for Gladiators Trier of the Basketball Bundesliga. He played college basketball for the Northeastern Huskies and the George Washington Colonials.

== High school career ==
Roland played for Westhill Senior High School in Syracuse, New York. As a junior, he averaged 23.9 points, 4.7 rebounds, 3.5 assists and 2.6 steals per game, leading his team to a 27–0 record and New York public school and federation Class B state titles. Roland scored 41 points in the state public school final. He was named New York Class B Player of the Year and All-Central New York Player of the Year. In his senior season, Roland averaged 21.3 points, 5.8 rebounds and 2.2 assists per game, helping his team repeat as New York public school and federation Class B state champions. He was named Class B Player of the Year and All-Central New York Player of the Year for a second straight season. Roland competed for Syracuse Select on the Amateur Athletic Union circuit and ran track for Westhill. He was considered a two-star recruit by 247Sports and ESPN. On July 14, 2014, after his junior season in high school, he committed to play college basketball for George Washington.

== College career ==
Roland played sparingly in his freshman season at George Washington. As a sophomore, he averaged 6.7 points per game, before requesting his release from the program. Roland transferred to Northeastern and sat out one season due to National Collegiate Athletic Association transfer rules. On November 9, 2018, Roland scored a junior season-high 35 points, shooting 7-of-10 from three-point range, in an 81–71 win over Harvard. As a junior, he averaged 14.6 points per game, setting a single-season school record with 99 three-pointers, and was named to the Third Team All-Colonial Athletic Association (CAA). In his senior debut, on November 5, 2019, Roland scored a then-career-high 39 points in a 72–67 victory over Boston University. In the following game, he scored a career-high and school-record 42 points in an 84–79 win over Harvard, two days before being named Lou Henson National Player of the Week. As a senior, Roland averaged 21.9 points per game, which led the CAA and ranked 10th in the NCAA Division I, and posted six 30-point games. He was named to the First Team All-CAA and left as Northeastern's all-time leader in free throw percentage (.890).

== Professional career ==
In February 2021, Jordan signed with Valur of the Icelandic Úrvalsdeild karla. On 8 March, he scored 35 points against Reykjavík rivals ÍR. It was Valur's first victory against KR since 1999.

On July 16, 2021, he has signed with Rostock Seawolves of the German ProA. He later helped the team to promote to the Basketball Bundesliga.

== Personal life ==
Roland's father, Rahsaah, played basketball for Mercyhurst University. His younger brother, Ryan, played the same sport for Mercyhurst and Le Moyne College.
