= TJ Bamba =

American basketball player (born 2001)

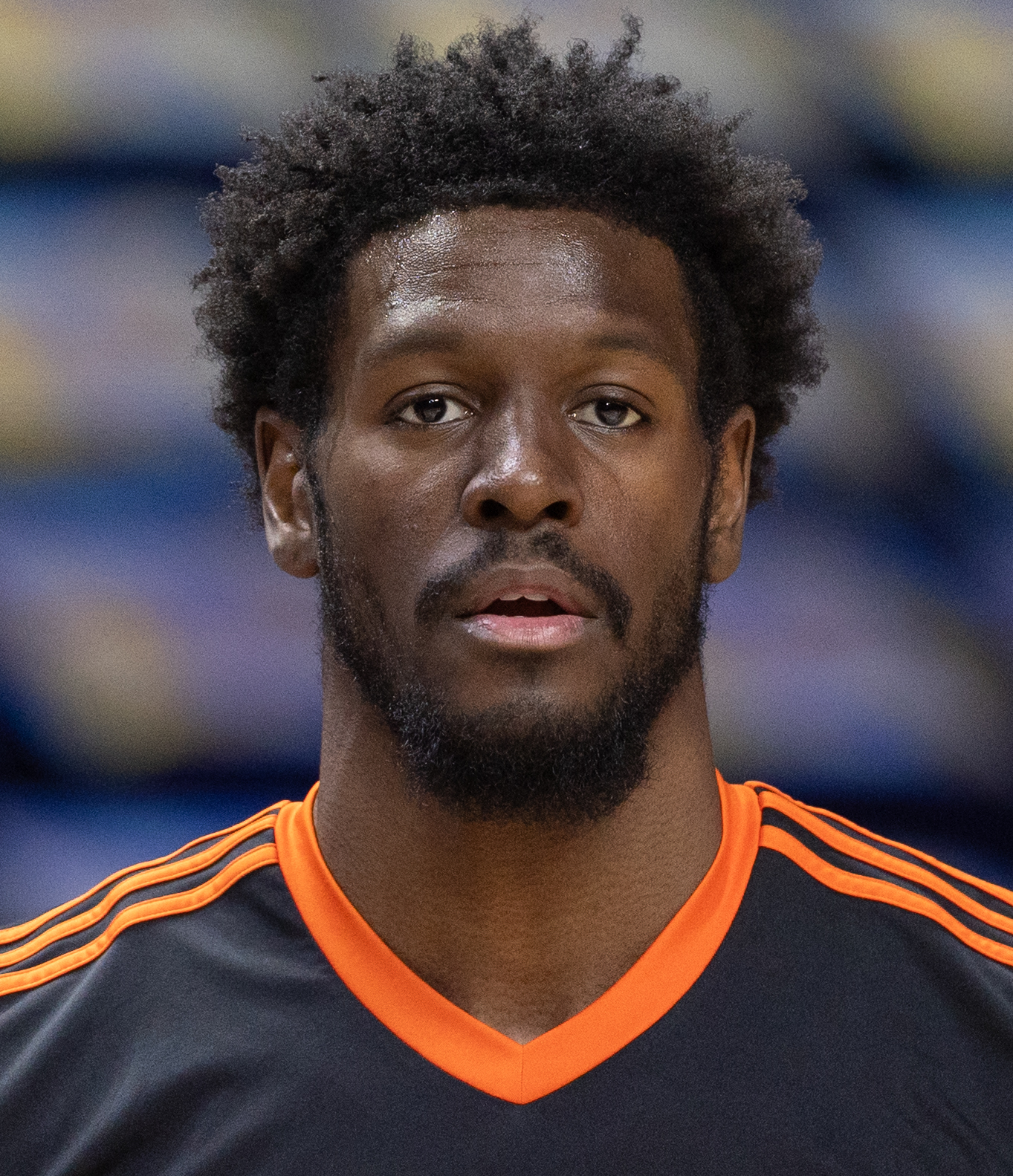
- TJ Bamba in 2026

No. 1 – La Laguna Tenerife
- Position: Shooting guard
- League: Liga ACB

Personal information
- Born: January 6, 2001 (age 25) Bronx, New York, U.S.
- Listed height: 6 ft 5 in (1.96 m)
- Listed weight: 215 lb (98 kg)

Career information
- High school: Kipp (Bronx, New York); Abraham Lincoln (Denver, Colorado)
- College: Washington State (2020–2023); Villanova (2023–2024); Oregon (2024–2025)
- NBA draft: 2025: undrafted
- Playing career: 2025–present

Career history
- 2025–2026: Rasta Vechta
- 2026–present: La Laguna Tenerife

Ahmed Tijani "TJ" Bamba (born January 6, 2001) is an American professional basketball player for La Laguna Tenerife of the Liga ACB. He played college basketball for the Washington State Cougars, Villanova Wildcats, and Oregon Ducks.

== Early life and high school career ==
Bamba was born in the Bronx. At the age of seven, he was sent to Senegal to study Islam and the Arabic language. Bamba returned to the United States to attend Kipp High School in the Bronx. After his sophomore season, he began to take basketball more seriously and transferred to Abraham Lincoln High School in Denver, Colorado, moving in with an aunt and uncle. Bamba averaged 13.5 points, 5.1 rebounds, 2.5 assists and 1.7 steals per game as a junior. As a senior, he averaged 24 points and 10 rebounds per game, garnering all-state honors. Rated a two-star recruit, Bamba committed to play college basketball at Washington State over offers from McNeese State, Towson, Northern Colorado, University of Illinois-Chicago and Stony Brook.

== College career ==
Bamba made four starts as a freshman and averaged 4.2 points per game. He averaged 7.7 points and 3.4 rebounds per game as a sophomore. He was hampered somewhat by a hand injury during his junior season but managed to have a breakout year. As a junior, Bamba averaged 15.8 points, 3.7 rebounds and 1.7 assists per game and was an All-Pac-12 honorable mention. He opted to transfer to Villanova after the season. Bamba averaged 10.1 points, 3.6 rebounds and 1.8 assists per game for the Wildcats. Following the season he transferred to Oregon. Bamba averaged 10.5 points, 3.4 rebounds, 3.0 assists, and 1.8 steals per game for the Ducks. He earned Big Ten All-Defensive Team honors and was a finalist for the Lefty Driesell Award.

== Professional career ==
After not being selected in the 2025 NBA draft, Bamba joined the Brooklyn Nets for NBA Summer League play. He later signed with Rasta Vechta of the Basketball Bundesliga.

On July 20, 2026, Bamba signed with La Laguna Tenerife of the Liga ACB.
