= Sam Griesel =

American-German basketball player

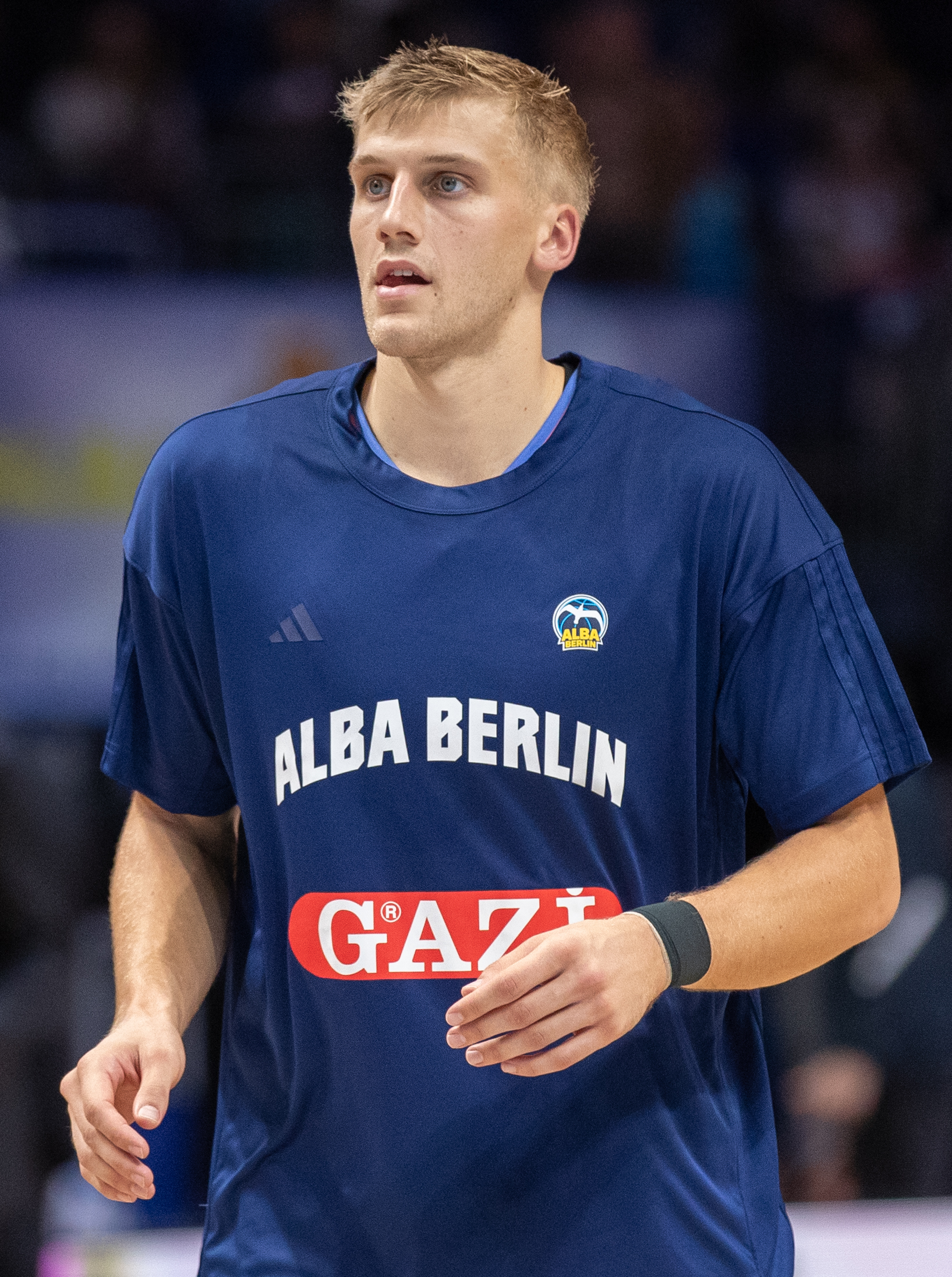

No. 5 – Alba Berlin
- Position: Shooting guard / Small forward
- League: BBL; Champions League

Personal information
- Born: March 22, 2000 (age 26) Lincoln, Nebraska, U.S.
- Listed height: 2.00 m (6 ft 7 in)
- Listed weight: 98 kg (216 lb)

Career information
- High school: Lincoln East (Lincoln, Nebraska)
- College: North Dakota State (2018–2022); Nebraska (2022–2023)
- NBA draft: 2023: undrafted
- Playing career: 2023–present

Career history
- 2023–2025: Telekom Baskets Bonn
- 2025–present: Alba Berlin
Medals
Men's basketball
Representing Germany
FIBA U20 European Championship
| Bronze medal – third place | 2019 Tel Aviv | Team |

Sam Griesel (born March 22, 2000) is an American-German professional basketball player for Alba Berlin of the German Basketball Bundesliga (BBL), and the Champions League. He plays the shooting guard and small forward position.

== Early life and high school career ==
Sam Griesel was born on March 22, 2000, in Lincoln, Nebraska. He is the son to an American mother, and a father who emigrated from Germany. Growing up, Griesel played soccer, which was practiced in his father's family. Griesel played soccer and high school basketball at Lincoln East. He averaged 15.2 points, 5.3 rebounds and 1.8 assists per game during his high school career.

== College career ==
Griesel began his collegiate career at North Dakota State prior to the 2018–19 season. He went on to play four years at the school, averaging 9.9 points, 5.6 rebounds and 2.3 assists per game.

For Griesel's final year of eligibility in the 2022–23 season, he transferred to Nebraska. He averaged 12 points, 5.8 rebounds and 3.8 assists per game.

== Professional career ==
After going undrafted during the 2023 NBA draft, Griesel started his professional career signing a two-year contract with German club Telekom Baskets Bonn.

At the expiration of his contract with Bonn, Griesel signed a two-year deal with club Alba Berlin heading into the 2025–26 season.

== National team career ==
In 2019, Griesel was selected to represent Germany at the 2019 FIBA U20 European Championship. He helped the Germany U20 national team to a bronze medal finish, averaging 5.9 points and 5.3 rebounds per game during the tournament.

== Personal life ==
In September 2024, an American sports drama film named Rez Ball made its debut, where Griesel played an acting role of a young basketball player.
