= Zachary Ensminger =

German-American basketball player (born 2001)

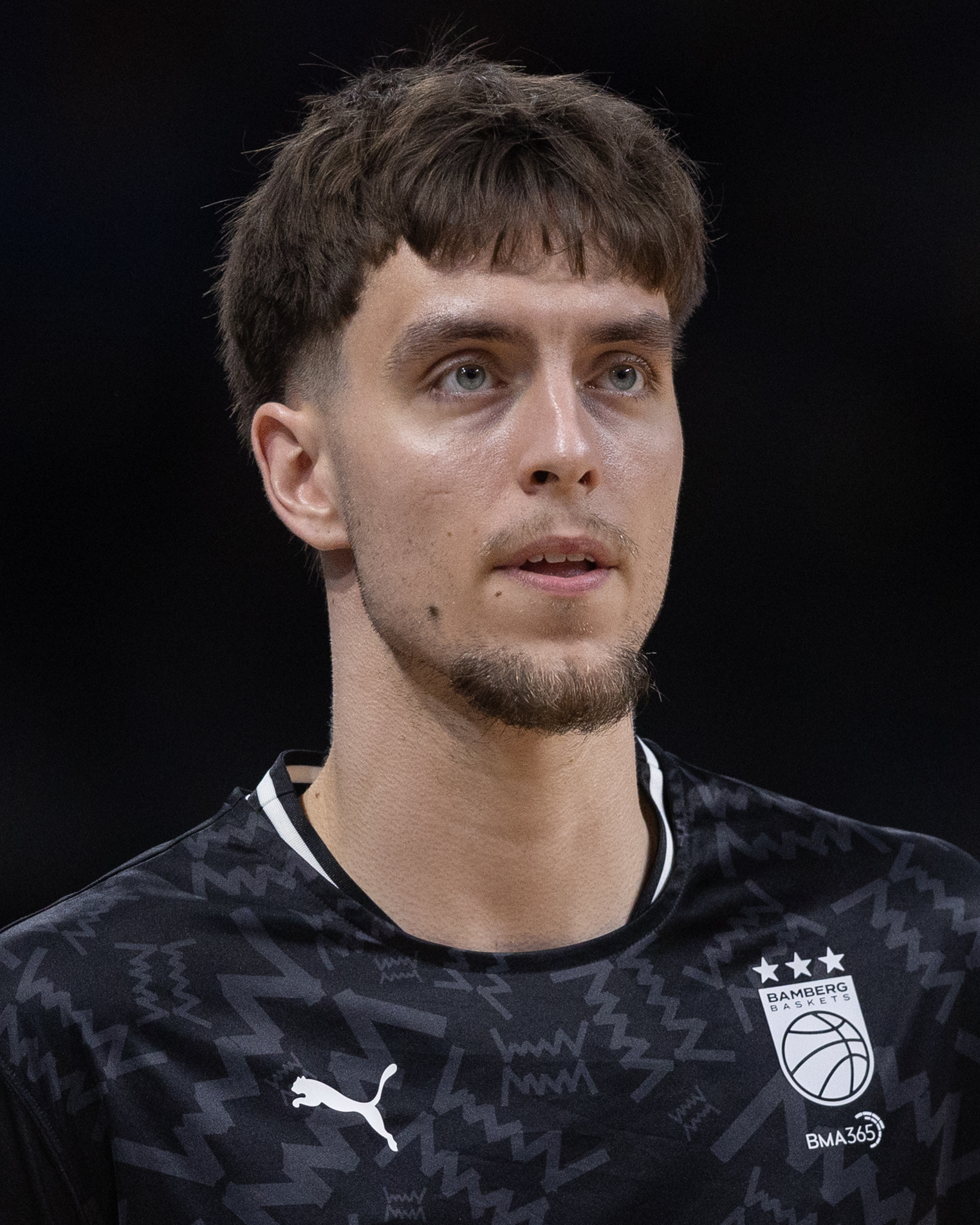
- Ensminger in 2026

No. 3 – Oldenburg
- Position: Point guard
- League: Basketball Bundesliga

Personal information
- Born: 30 April 2001 (age 25) Valparaiso, Indiana, U.S.
- Listed height: 1.95 m (6 ft 5 in)
- Listed weight: 88 kg (194 lb)

Career information
- Playing career: 2017–present

Career history
- 2017–2020: OrangeAcademy
- 2019–2020: ratiopharm Ulm
- 2020–2022: Artland Dragons
- 2022–2023: Telekom Baskets Bonn
- 2023–2025: BG Göttingen
- 2025: Kauhajoki Karhu
- 2025–2026: Bamberg Baskets
- 2026–present: Baskets Oldenburg

Career highlights
- FIBA Champions League champion (2023)

Zachary Ensminger (born 30 April 2001) is a German-American professional basketball player for Baskets Oldenburg in the Basketball Bundesliga (BBL).

== Professional career ==
When playing for Telekom Baskets Bonn under coach Tuomas Iisalo, Ensminger was part of the team that won the 2022–23 Basketball Champions League title.

Besides in Germany, Ensminger played for Finnish Korisliiga team Kauhajoki Karhu Basket in 2025, finishing 2nd in the league.

== Personal life ==
His father Chris is an American basketball coach and former player.
