= Norris Agbakoko =

German basketball player (born 2000)

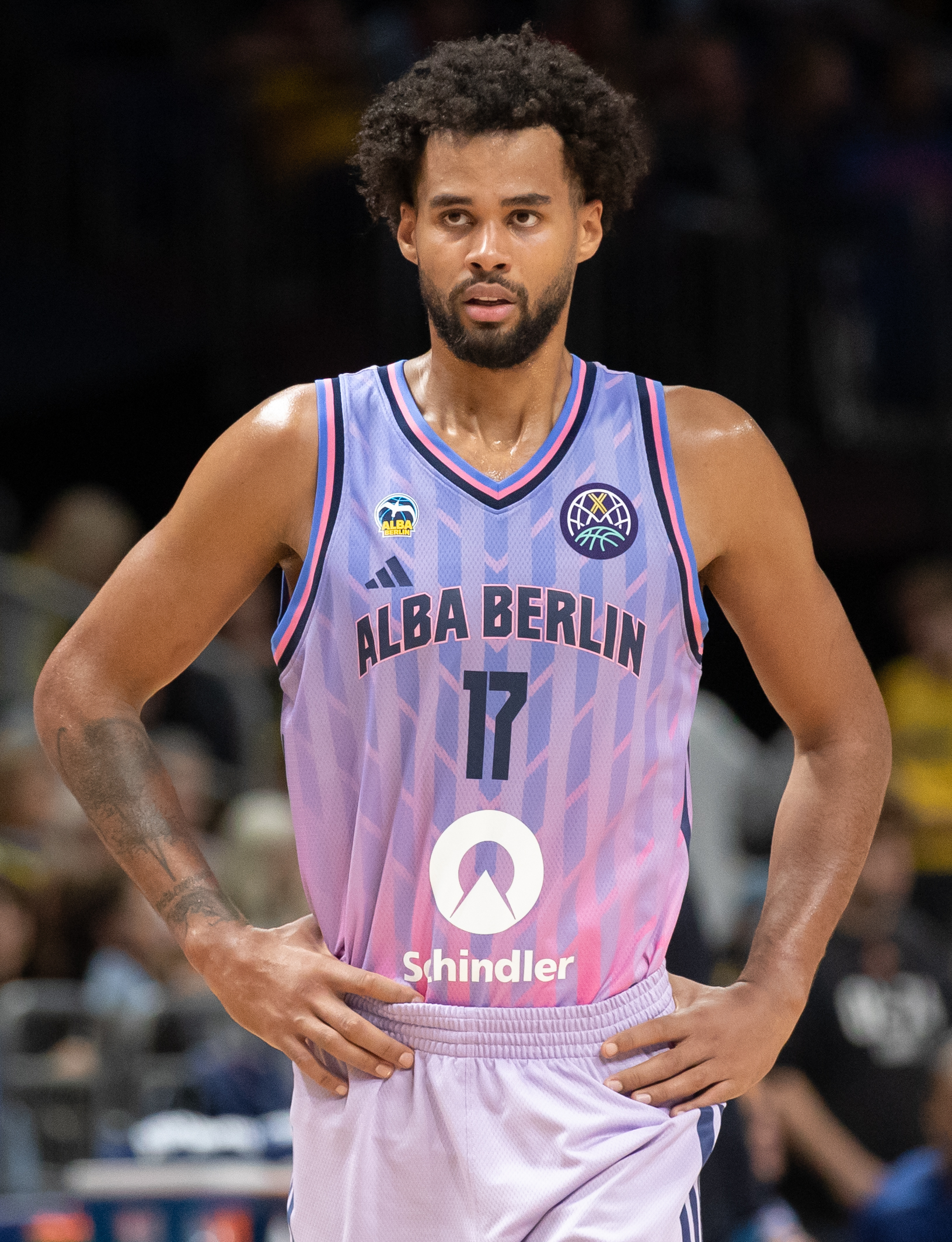
- Agbakoko in 2025

No. 17 – Alba Berlin
- Position: Center
- League: BBL

Personal information
- Born: 16 January 2000 (age 26) Bremen, Germany
- Listed height: 2.18 m (7 ft 2 in)
- Listed weight: 110 kg (243 lb)

Career information
- Playing career: 2018–present

Career history
- 2018–2025: EWE Baskets Oldenburg
- 2025–present: Alba Berlin

Norris Agbakoko (born 16 January 2000) is a German professional basketball player for Alba Berlin of the Basketball Bundesliga (BBL). He plays as a center.

== Early life ==
Agbakoko was born in Bremen, Germany, and initially played football during his youth. He transitioned to basketball after being discovered by Srdjan Klaric, the sporting director of EWE Baskets Oldenburg, in 2016. He subsequently joined the club's youth development program.

== Professional career ==
Agbakoko began his professional career with EWE Baskets Oldenburg in 2018, playing for their development team, Baskets Juniors/Oldenburger TB, in the 2. Bundesliga ProB. He also gained experience in the Regionalliga with TSG Westerstede.

He made his debut in the Basketball Bundesliga during the 2020–21 season.

In June 2022, Agbakoko extended his contract with EWE Baskets Oldenburg until 2025, reflecting the club's confidence in his development.

In the 2023–24 BBL season, Agbakoko appeared in 23 games, averaging 6.9 points, 5.5 rebounds, and 0.7 assists per game, with a field goal percentage of 68.5%.

== National team career ==
Agbakoko has represented Germany at various youth levels. In the summer of 2023, he was part of the German U23 national team that participated in the Globl Jam tournament in Toronto under head coach Gordon Herbert.
