= Weser-Ems Halle =

Arena complex in Oldenburg, Germany

Coordinates: 53°08′51″N 8°13′40″E

Weser-Ems-Halle

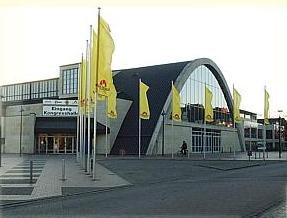
- Interactive map of Weser-Ems-Halle
- Location: Oldenburg, Niedersachsen; Germany
- Owner: City of Oldenburg
- Capacity: 10,000 (concerts); 5,400 (exhibitions); 6,069 (basketball) (Große EWE Arena)

Construction
- Opened: 1954
- Renovated: 1995
- Expanded: 1985

Weser-Ems-Halle is a multi-purpose hall and arena complex with eight halls including the large Große EWE Arena, the small Kleine EWE Arena, the Kongresshalle and the Halle 3, or Messehalle. It is located in Oldenburg, Germany. The seating capacity of the venue is 6,069, for basketball games (at the Große EWE Arena). The venue can host music concerts, sports events, congresses, and conferences.

== See also ==
- Große EWE Arena
- Kleine EWE Arena
