= Kleine EWE Arena =

Multi-purpose hall in Oldenburg, Germany

Coordinates: 53°08′49″N 8°13′36″E

Kleine EWE Arena Small EWE Arena
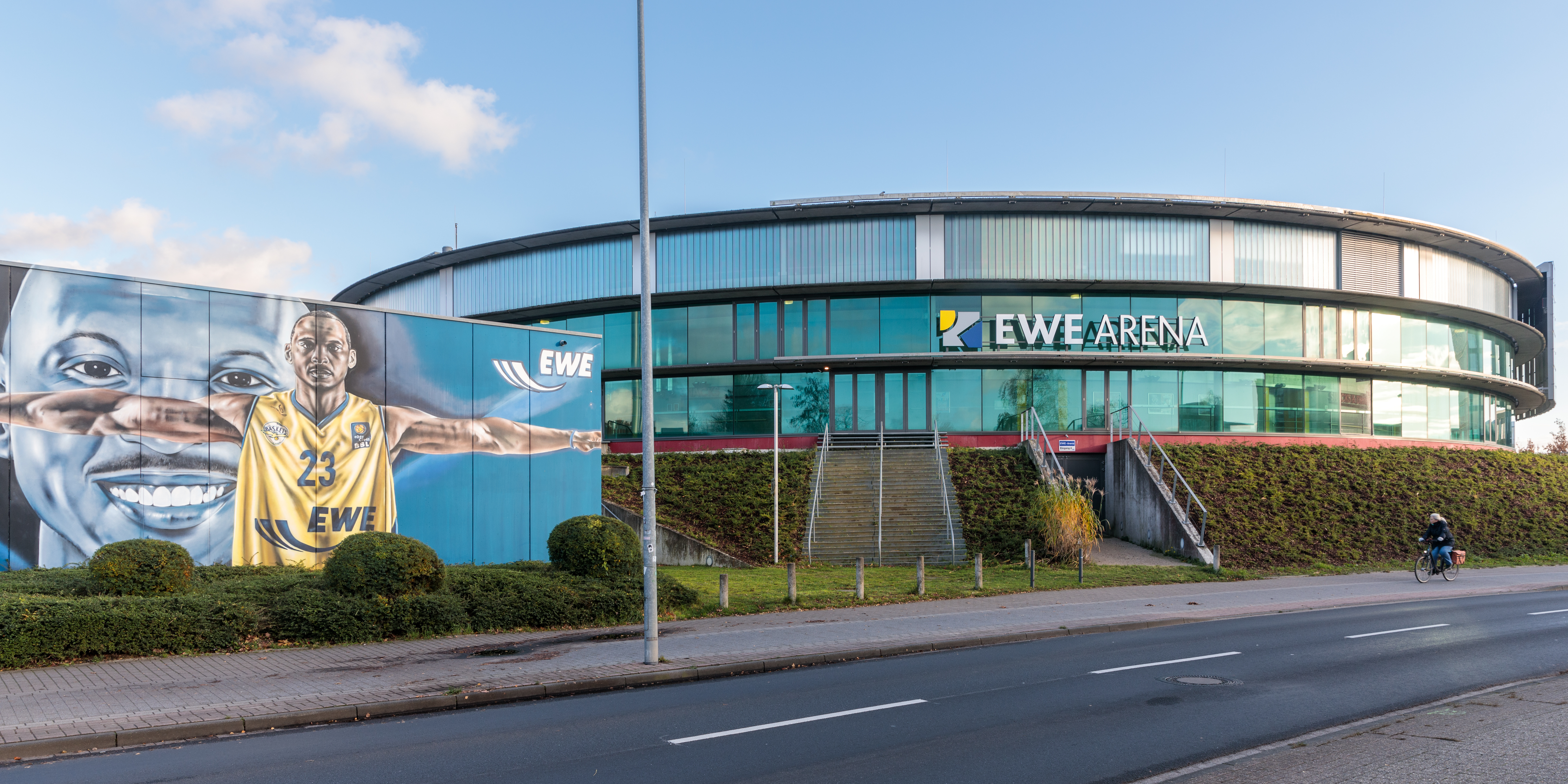
- Interactive map of Kleine EWE Arena; Small EWE Arena
- Location: Oldenburg, Lower Saxony; Germany
- Owner: City of Oldenburg
- Capacity: Kleine EWE Arena; Concerts: 4,100; Basketball: 3,148; Handball: 2,300

Construction
- Groundbreaking: 2004
- Built: 2005
- Cost: € 9 million
- Architect: 'asp' architekten Stuttgart

Tenants
- EWE Baskets Oldenburg (Basketball) (2005–2013)

Kleine EWE Arena (English: Small EWE Arena) is a dual indoor sporting arena complex that is located in Oldenburg, Germany. It is a part of the Weser-Ems Halle multi-sporting complex, which contains two main sports arena halls, the small Kleine EWE Arena, and the large Große EWE Arena. The facility's name comes from a sponsorship arrangement with the German energy and telecommunications company EWE AG.

== Kleine EWE arena ==
The small Kleine EWE arena has a seating capacity of 4,100 for concerts, 3,148 for basketball games, and 2,300 for handball games.

It was regularly used as the home arena of the EWE Baskets Oldenburg professional basketball team for national domestic German League games from 2005 to 2013, and occasionally used by them for their home games after that.

== Gallery ==
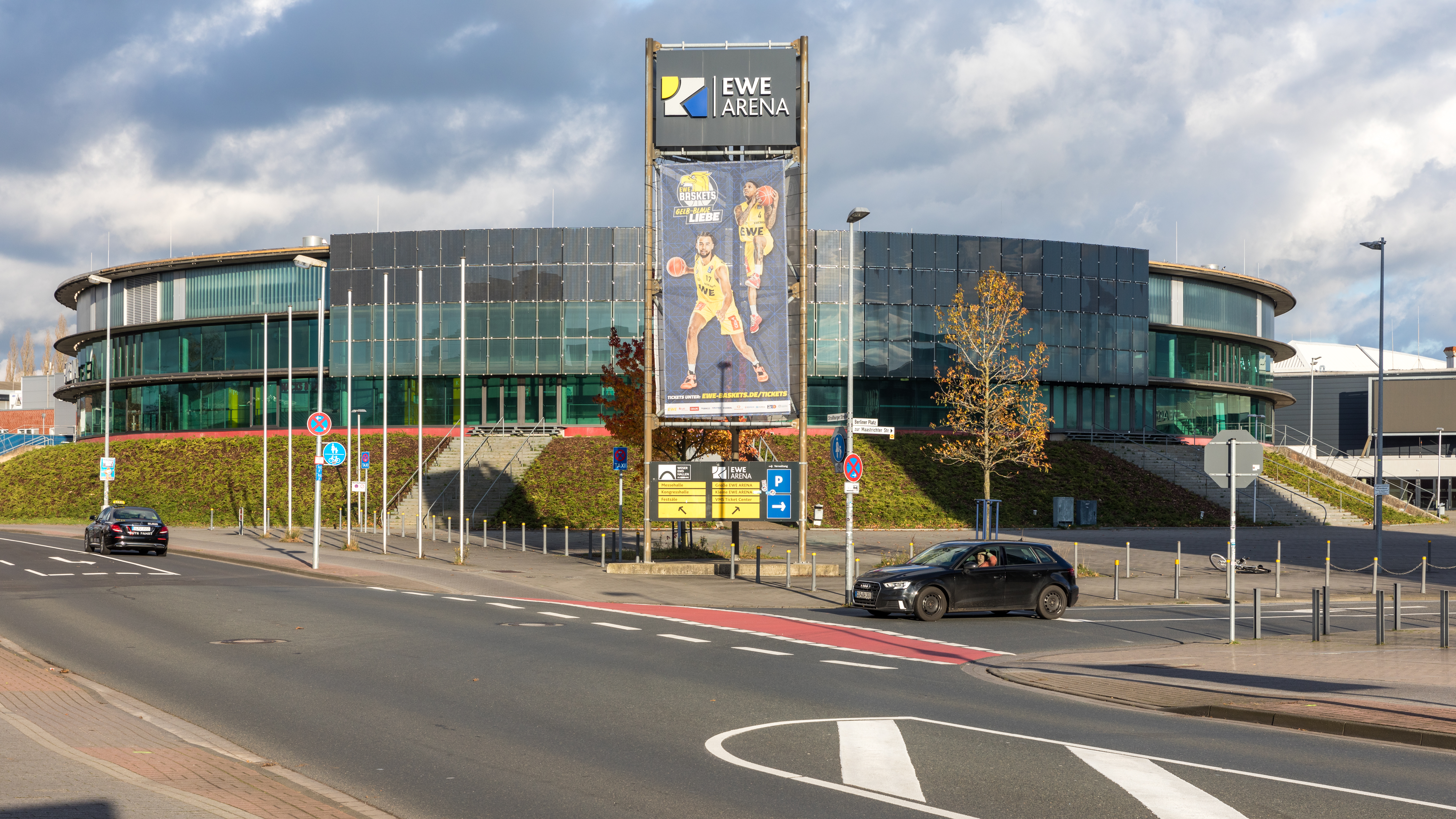
Kleine EWE-Arena

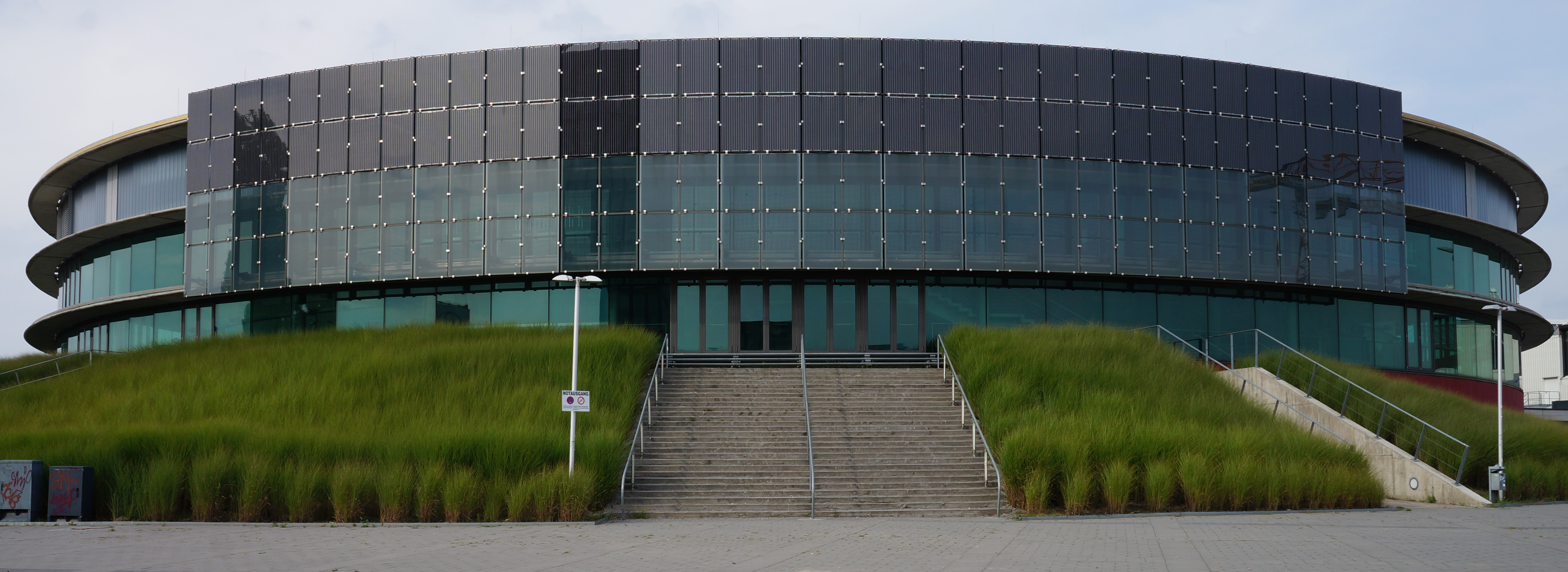
Kleine EWE Arena

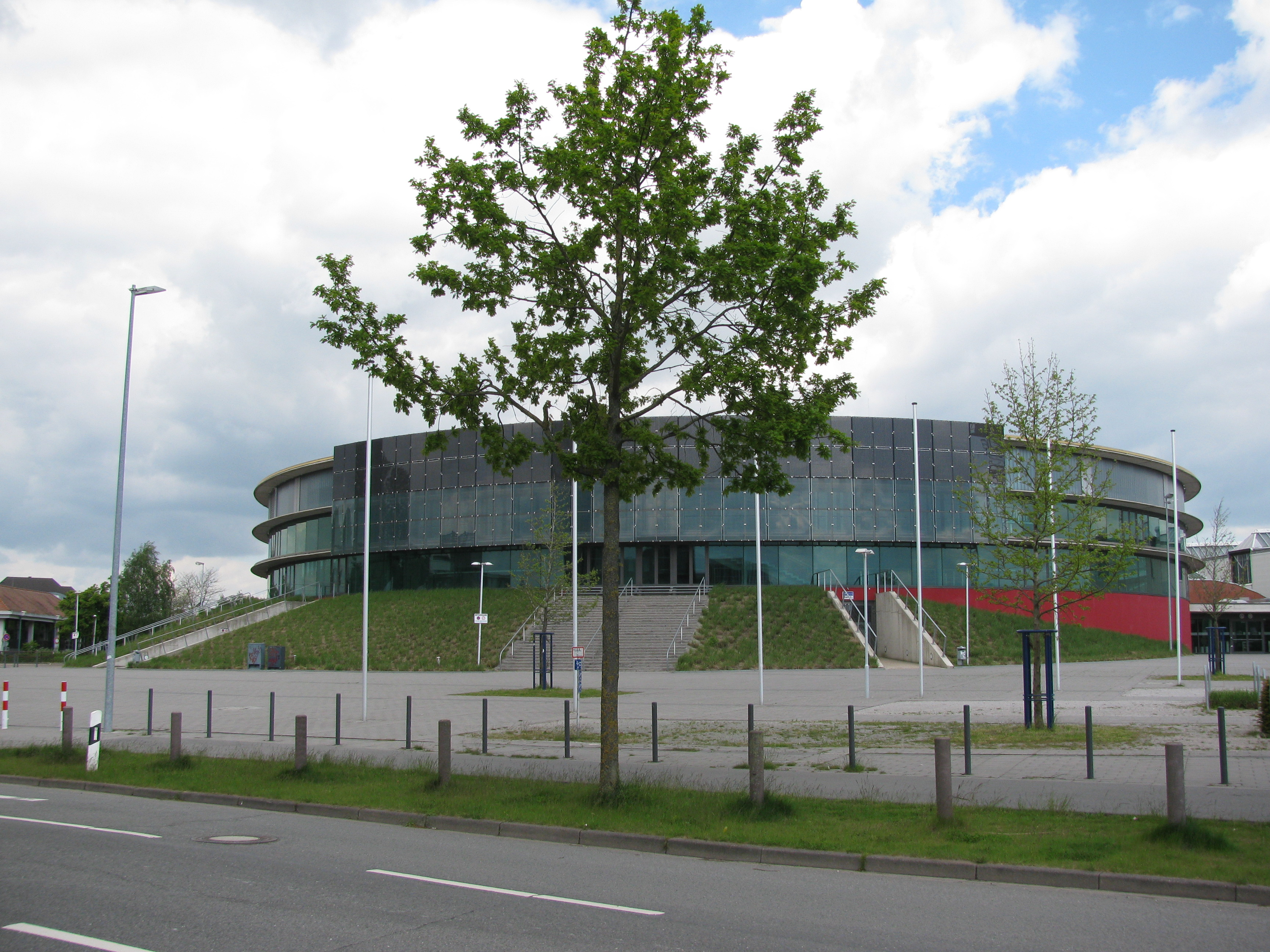
Kleine EWE Arena

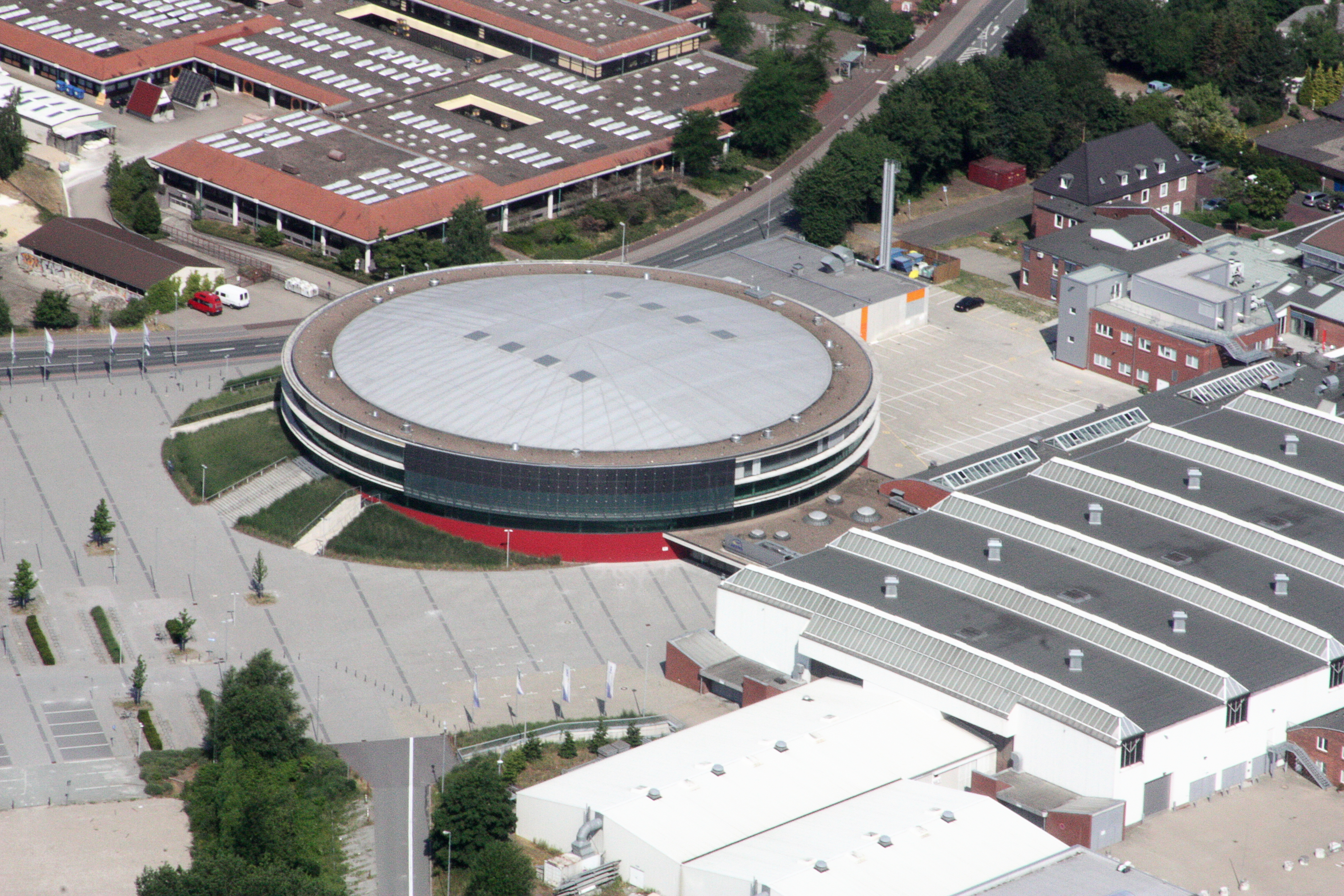
Kleine EWE Arena

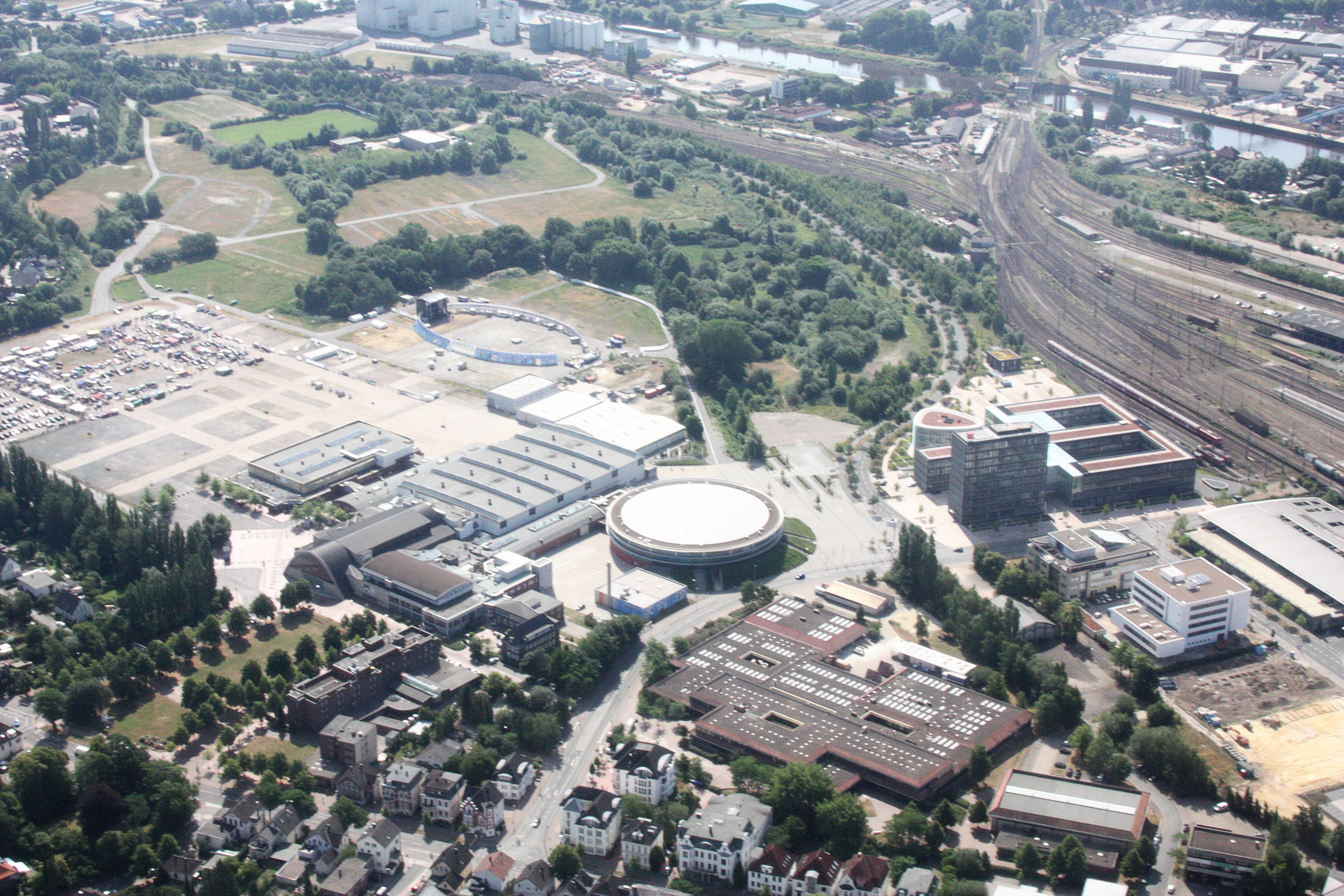
Kleine EWE Arena

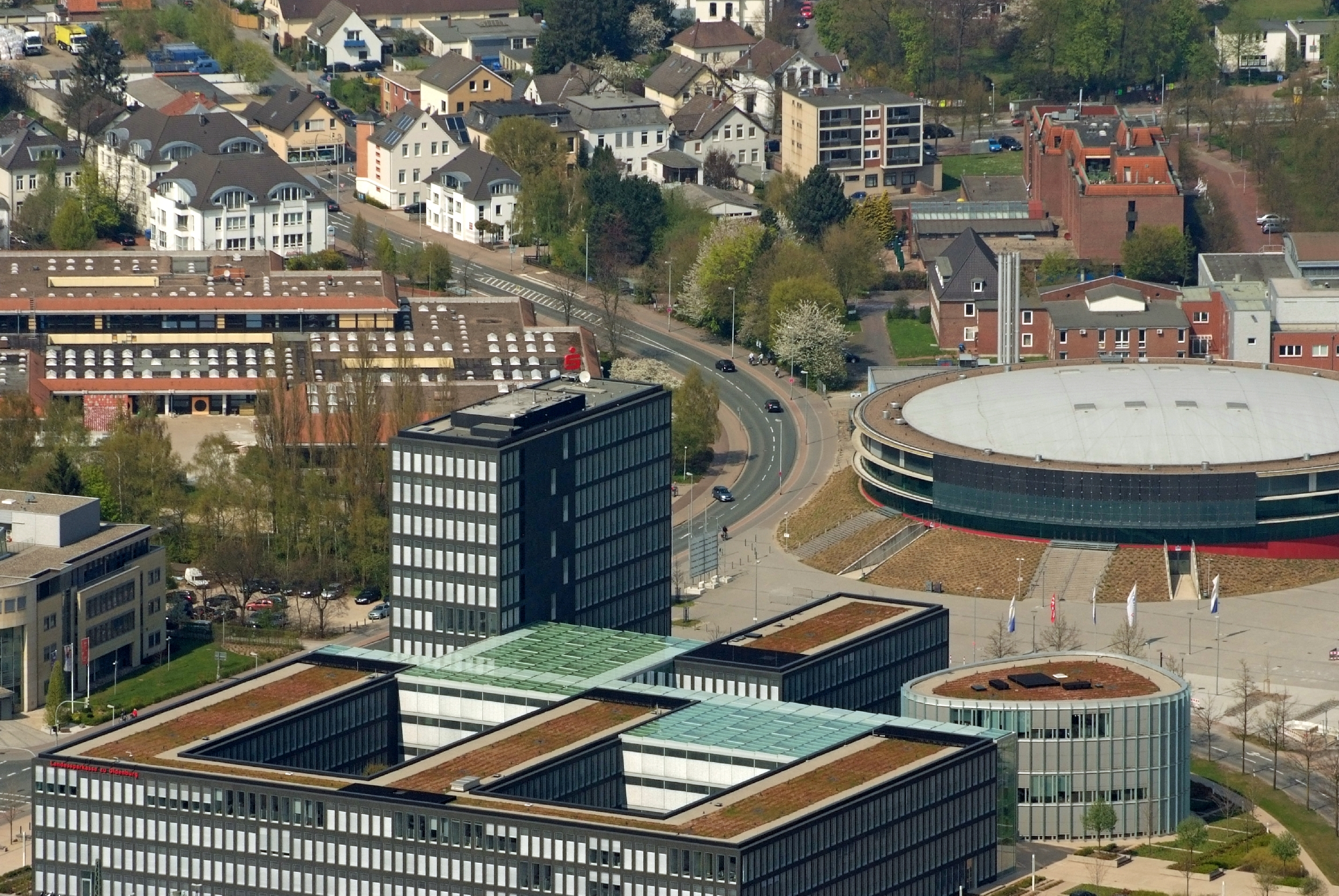
Kleine EWE Arena
