= Oldenburg (city) =

City in Lower Saxony, Germany

Oldenburg Ollnborg (Northern Low Saxon)
- City
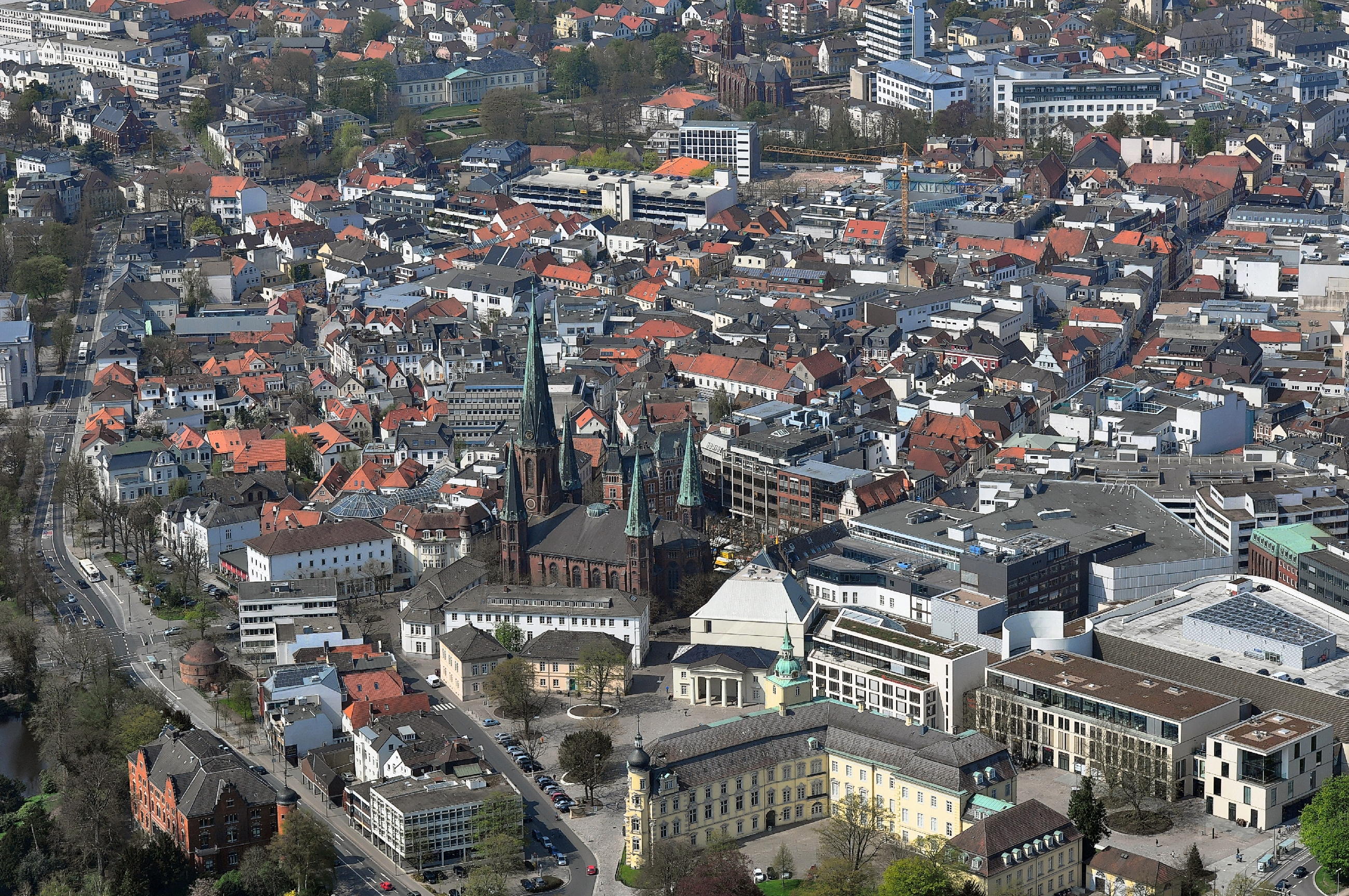
- City centre of Oldenburg including St Lamberti Church, Schloss Oldenburg (Oldenburg Palace) and the Oldenburgisches Staatstheater (Oldenburg State Theatre; left image border)

- Flag Coat of arms
- Interactive map of Oldenburg
- Location within Germany Location within Lower Saxony
- Coordinates: 53°08′38″N 8°12′50″E
- Country: Germany
- State: Lower Saxony
- District: Urban district
- Subdivisions: 33 boroughs, separated into nine census tracts

Government
  - Mayor (2026–31): Jascha Rohr (Ind.)

Area
  - Total: 102.96 km^{2} (39.75 sq mi)
- Elevation: 4 m (13 ft)

Population (2025-12-31)
  - Total: 177,055
  - Density: 1,719.6/km^{2} (4,453.9/sq mi)
- Time zone: UTC+01:00 (CET)
  - Summer (DST): UTC+02:00 (CEST)
- Postal codes: 26001–26135
- Dialling codes: 0441
- Vehicle registration: OL
- Website: www.oldenburg.de

Oldenburg (German: [ˈɔldn̩bʊʁk]; Northern Low Saxon: Ollnborg) is an independent city in the state of Lower Saxony, Germany. The city is officially named Oldenburg (Oldb) (Oldenburg in Oldenburg) to distinguish it from Oldenburg in Holstein.

During the French annexation (1811–1813) in the wake of the Napoleonic war against Britain, it was also known as Le Vieux-Bourg in French. The city is on the rivers Hunte and Haaren, in the northwestern region between the cities of Bremen in the east and Groningen (Netherlands) in the west. According to Germany's 2022 census, the city's population is 176.068 in 2024. Oldenburg is part of the Northwest Metropolitan Region, which is home to approximately 2.8 million people.

The city is the place of origin of the House of Oldenburg. Before the end of the German Empire (1918), it was the administrative centre and residence of the monarchs of Oldenburg.

== History ==
Archaeological finds point to a settlement dating back to the 8th century. The first documentary evidence, in 1108, referenced Aldenburg in connection with Elimar I (also known as Egilmar I) who is now commonly seen as the first count of Oldenburg. The town gained importance due to its location at a ford of the navigable Hunte river. Oldenburg became the capital of the County of Oldenburg (later a Duchy (1774–1810), Grand Duchy (1815–1918), and Free State (1918–1946)), a small state in the shadow of the much more powerful Hanseatic city of Bremen.

In the 17th century Oldenburg was a wealthy town in a time of war and turmoil and its population and power grew considerably. In 1667, the town was struck by a disastrous plague epidemic and, shortly after, a fire destroyed Oldenburg. The Danish kings, who were also counts of Oldenburg at the time, had little interest in the condition of the town and it lost most of its former importance. In 1773, Danish rule ended. Only then were the destroyed buildings in the city rebuilt in a neoclassicist style. (German-speakers usually call the "neoclassicist style" of that period klassizistisch, while neoklassizistisch specifically refers to the classicist style of the early 20th century.)

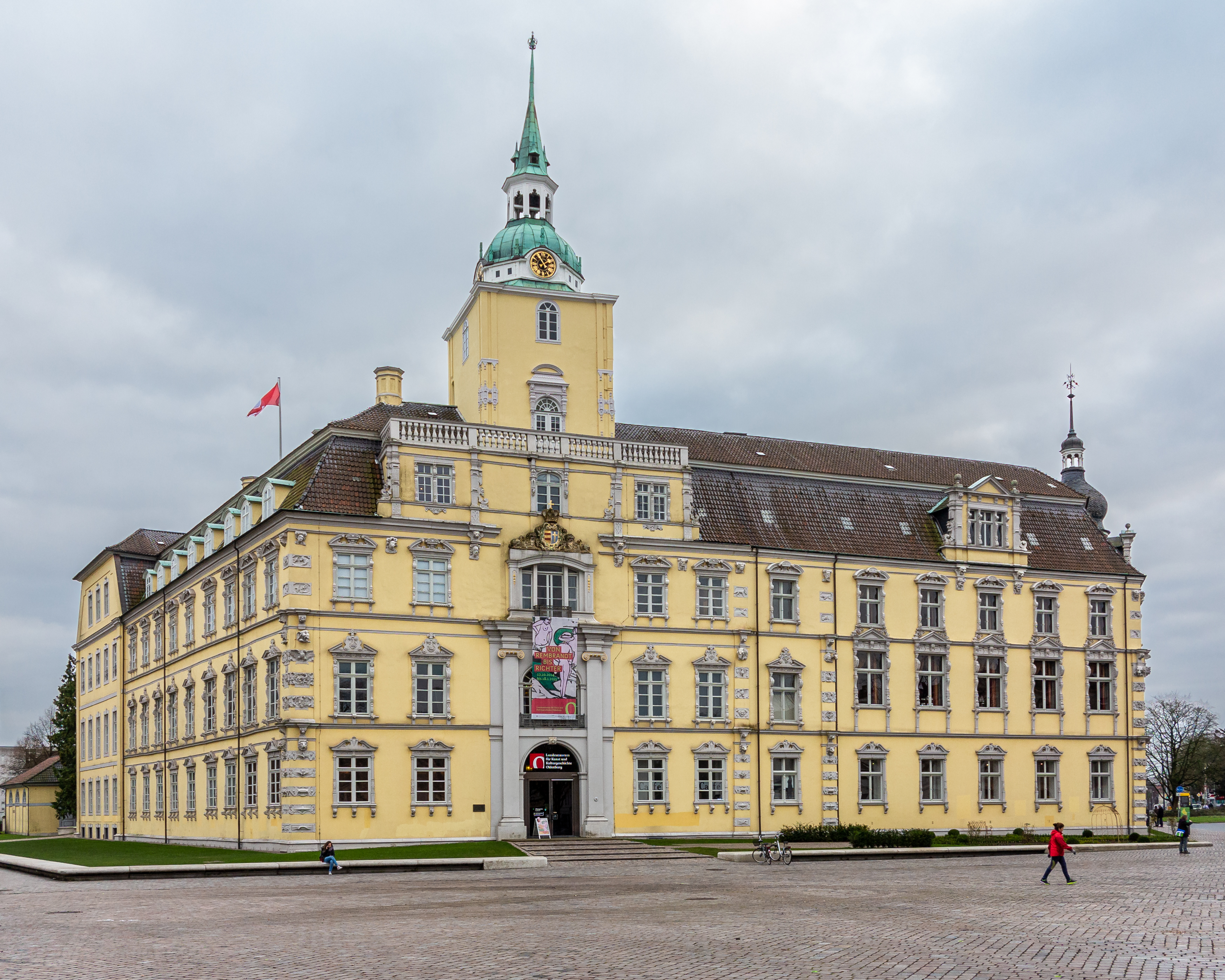
Oldenburg castle

After the German government announced the abdication of Emperor Wilhelm II (9 November 1918) following the exhaustion and defeat of the German Empire in World War I, monarchic rule ended in Oldenburg as well with the abdication of Grand Duke Frederick Augustus II of Oldenburg (Friedrich August II von Oldenburg) on 11 November 1918. The Grand Duchy now became the Free State of Oldenburg (German: Freistaat Oldenburg), with the city remaining the capital.

In the 1928 city elections, the Nazi Party received 9.8% of the vote, enough for a seat on the Oldenburg city council. In the September 1930 Oldenburg state elections, the Nazi Party's share of the vote rose to 27.3%, and on May 29, 1932, the Nazi Party received 48.4% in the state election, enough to put the Nazi party in charge of forming a state government and, significantly, making Oldenburg the first state in the country to put the Nazis in power based on electoral turnout. By that autumn, a campaign of Aryanization began, forcing the sale of formerly Jewish-owned properties at steep discounts.

In 1945, after World War II, the State of Oldenburg became part of the British zone of occupation. The British military government of the Oldenburg region resided in the city. Several displaced-persons camps were set up in the city that had suffered only 1.4% destruction during the bombing campaigns of World War II. About 42,000 refugees migrated into Oldenburg, which raised the number of residents to over 100,000. In 1946 the Free State of Oldenburg was dissolved and the area became the 'Administrative District' of Oldenburg (Verwaltungsbezirk Oldenburg) within the newly formed federal German state of Lower Saxony (Niedersachsen). The city was now capital of the district. In 1978 the district was dissolved and succeeded by the newly formed Weser-Ems administrative region (Regierungsbezirk Weser-Ems), again with the city as administrative capital. The state of Lower Saxony dissolved all of the Regierungsbezirke by the end of 2004 in the course of administrative reforms.

== Climate ==
Climate data for Oldenburg (1991–2020 normals)
| Month | Jan | Feb | Mar | Apr | May | Jun | Jul | Aug | Sep | Oct | Nov | Dec | Year |
|---|---|---|---|---|---|---|---|---|---|---|---|---|---|
| Mean daily maximum °C (°F) | 4.7 (40.5) | 5.4 (41.7) | 9.3 (48.7) | 14.3 (57.7) | 18.1 (64.6) | 20.6 (69.1) | 23.2 (73.8) | 22.8 (73.0) | 18.9 (66.0) | 13.8 (56.8) | 8.5 (47.3) | 4.7 (40.5) | 13.7 (56.7) |
| Daily mean °C (°F) | 0.9 (33.6) | 1.7 (35.1) | 4.9 (40.8) | 9.5 (49.1) | 13.9 (57.0) | 17.2 (63.0) | 19.4 (66.9) | 19 (66) | 14.6 (58.3) | 9.8 (49.6) | 5.1 (41.2) | 2.1 (35.8) | 9.8 (49.6) |
| Mean daily minimum °C (°F) | −0.1 (31.8) | −0.3 (31.5) | 1.6 (34.9) | 4.4 (39.9) | 7.9 (46.2) | 10.8 (51.4) | 13.4 (56.1) | 13.2 (55.8) | 10.2 (50.4) | 6.2 (43.2) | 3.2 (37.8) | 0.0 (32.0) | 5.9 (42.6) |
| Average precipitation mm (inches) | 71.1 (2.80) | 56.1 (2.21) | 54.1 (2.13) | 43.0 (1.69) | 56.4 (2.22) | 69.3 (2.73) | 88.8 (3.50) | 85.4 (3.36) | 75.7 (2.98) | 63.7 (2.51) | 65.1 (2.56) | 84.3 (3.32) | 816.9 (32.16) |
| Average precipitation days (≥ 1.0 mm) | 18.5 | 16.8 | 16.6 | 14.0 | 13.8 | 15.9 | 17.3 | 16.3 | 15.0 | 16.7 | 19.1 | 19.5 | 199.1 |
| Average snowy days (≥ 1.0 cm) | 4.5 | 3.2 | 1.5 | 0 | 0 | 0 | 0 | 0 | 0 | 0 | 0.7 | 3.9 | 13.8 |
| Average relative humidity (%) | 86.2 | 83.5 | 78.6 | 71.0 | 70.4 | 72.0 | 73.2 | 75.1 | 79.8 | 83.5 | 87.4 | 88.5 | 79.1 |
| Mean monthly sunshine hours | 45.3 | 63.0 | 117.1 | 172.8 | 213.2 | 200.5 | 209.1 | 191.1 | 143.8 | 110.0 | 48.0 | 40.1 | 1,562.1 |
Source: World Meteorological Organization

== City government ==
Local elections take place every five years. The city council (Stadtrat) has 50 seats. The lord mayor (Oberbürgermeister) is elected directly by the citizens.

Political parties in Oldenburg (Oldb) and their percentages of votes in past city council elections
| Election year | SPD | Bündnis ’90/ Die Grünen | CDU | Die Linke | Freie Wähler/ FW-BFO | FDP | Piraten Partei | NPD | LKR | AFD |
|---|---|---|---|---|---|---|---|---|---|---|
| 2001 | 40.1 | 13.6 | 30.5 | 3.9 | 2.8 | 8.2 | – | – | – | – |
| 2006 | 32.7 | 21.2 | 26.0 | 7.2 | 5.4 | 6.3 | – | – | – | – |
| 2011 | 34.0 | 27.3 | 20.6 | 6.1 | 3.1 | 3.0 | 2.8 | 1.1 | – | – |
| 2016 | 32.68 | 19.13 | 22.21 | 9.88 | 1.53 | 4.84 | 1.17 | 0.62 | 1.19 | 4.76 |

Resulting distribution of seats in the city council
| Election year | SPD | Grüne | CDU | Linke | FW | FDP | Piraten | WFO | NPD | LKR | AFD | Total seats |
|---|---|---|---|---|---|---|---|---|---|---|---|---|
| 2001 | 21 | 7 | 15 | 2 | 1 | 4 | – | – | – | – | – | 50 |
| 2006 | 16 | 11 | 13 | 4 | 3 | 3 | – | – | – | – | – | 50 |
| 2011 | 17 | 14 | 10 | 3 | 2 | 1 | 1 | 1 | 1 | – | – | 50 |
| 2016 | 16 | 10 | 11 | 5 | 1 | 2 | 1 | 1 | 0 | 1 | 2 | 50 |

== Economy and infrastructure ==
=== Transport ===
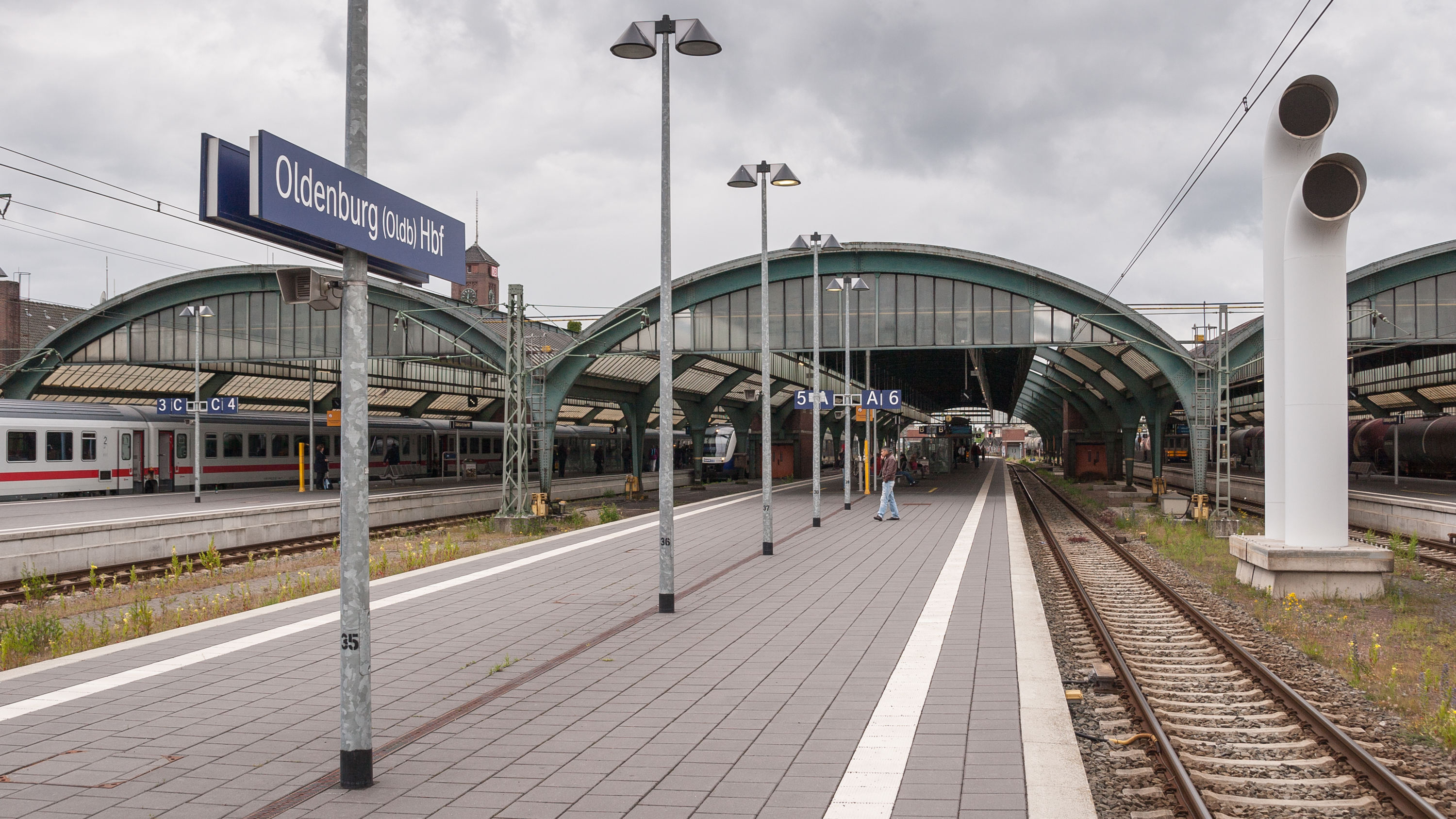
Oldenburg Railway Station

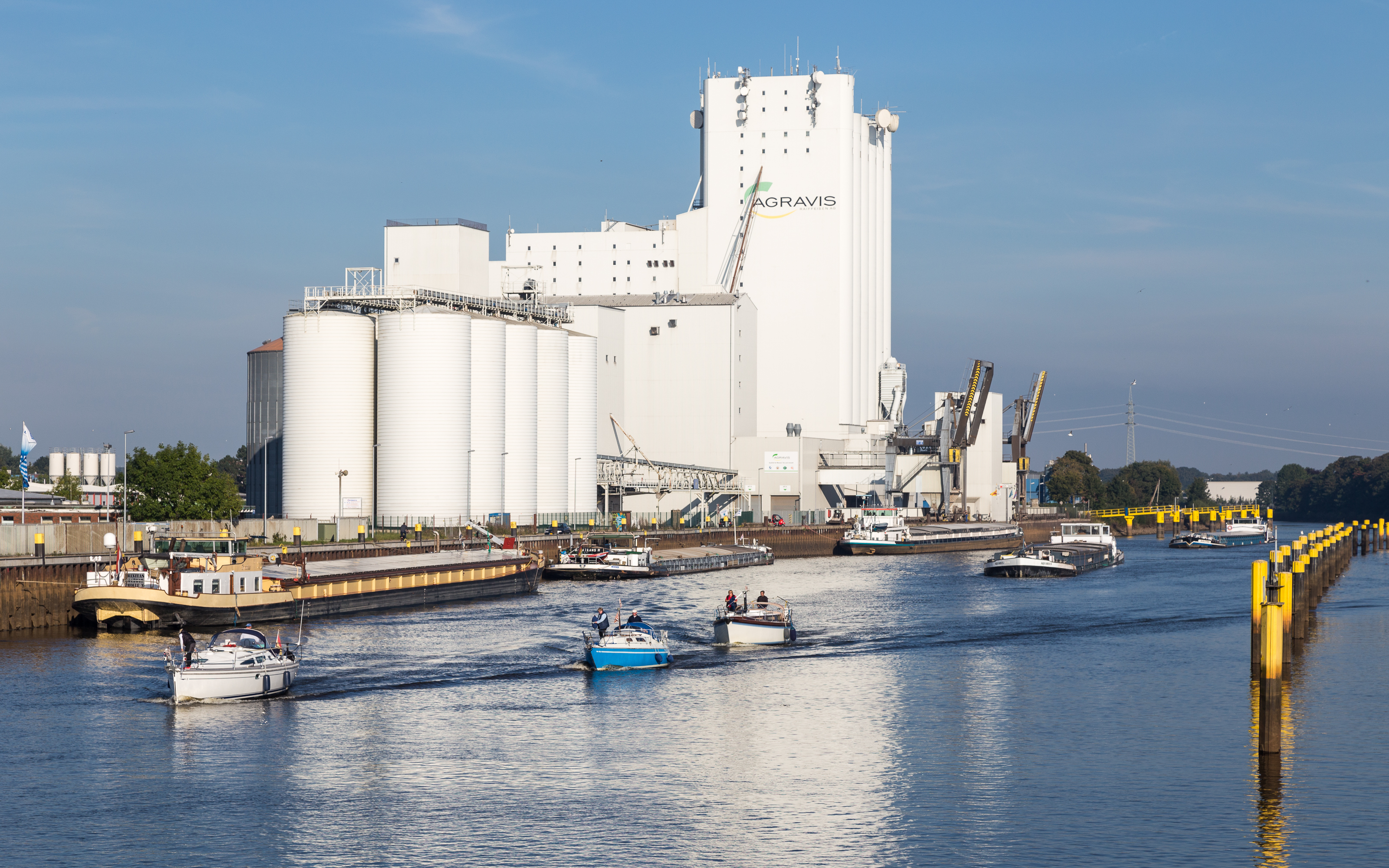
Oldenburg Harbour

The city centre of Oldenburg is surrounded by a ring of freeways (autobahns) consisting of A 28, A 29 and A 293. Because of this, Oldenburg is connected to the nationwide network of federal autobahns, as well as to the international E-road network (German: Europastraßen).

Oldenburg Central Station, Oldenburg (Oldb) Hauptbahnhof, is at the intersection of the railway lines Norddeich Mole—Leer—Oldenburg—Bremen and Wilhelmshaven—Oldenburg—Osnabrück, with Intercity services to Berlin, Leipzig and Dresden and InterCityExpress services to Frankfurt and Munich.

Oldenburg is only about half an hour drive from Bremen Airport (about 50 km | 31 miles). Other international airports nearby are Hamburg Airport (160 km | 100 miles) and Hannover-Langenhagen Airport (170 km | 106 miles).

The small Hatten Airfield, (Flugplatz Oldenburg-Hatten ICAO airport code: EDWH), is located about 17 km south-west of Oldenburg. It serves to small aircraft (private planes, gliders, balloons, and helicopters). A flight training school is also located there, and small planes can be chartered. Scenic flights can be booked as well.

Oldenburg is connected to shipping through the Küstenkanal, a ship canal connecting the rivers Ems and Weser. With 1.6 million tons of goods annually, it is the most important non-coastal harbour in Lower Saxony.

Bicycles play a very important part in personal transport.

=== Agriculture ===
The city is surrounded by large agricultural areas, about 80% of which is grassland. There are farms near and even a few within city limits. Predominant agricultural activities of the region are the cultivation of livestock, especially dairy cows and other grazing animals, crops such as grains for food and animal feed, as well as asparagus, corn, and kale.

=== Industry ===
Sea salt production in the Oldenburg region has been used since the 15th century to supply the huge salt demand in the Baltic region. Peat extraction in the area continued for many centuries until it was replaced by coal mines.

== Demographics ==
Residents by foreign citizenship
| Nationality | Population (2020) |
|---|---|
| Iraq | 3,635 |
| Syria | 2,190 |
| Turkey | 1,425 |
| Poland | 1,275 |
| Romania | 1,135 |
| Russia | 550 |
| Italy | 450 |
| Iran | 445 |
| Afghanistan | 410 |

As of 31.12.2019 Oldenburg had 169,960 residents. 24.8% of the population were first or second generation immigrants.

== Cultural life ==
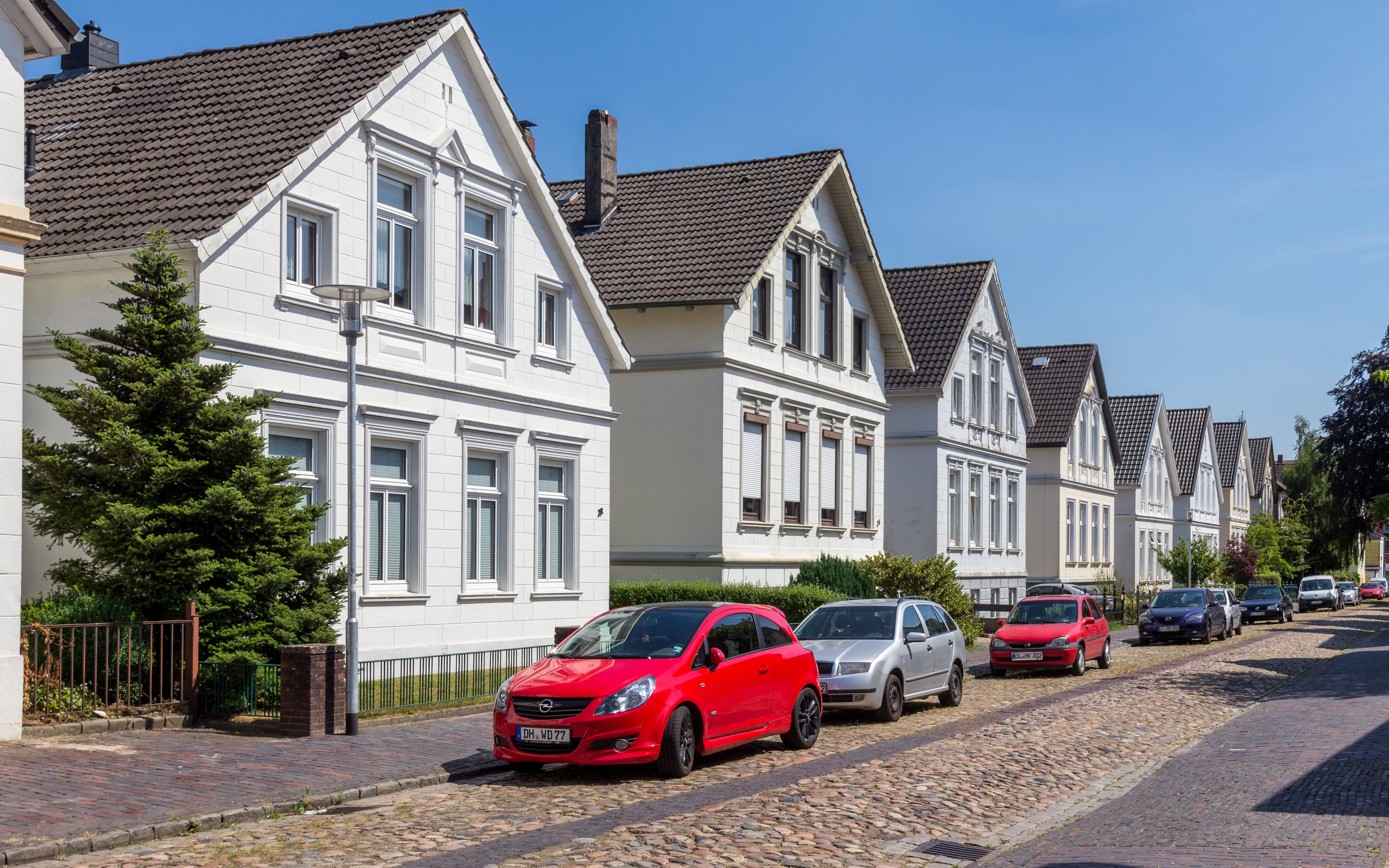
"Hundehütten" (dog houses) typical architecture in Oldenburg

=== Recurring cultural events ===
- Kultursommer (summer of culture), series of free musical and other cultural events in the city centre during summer holiday season in July.
- CSD Nordwest (Christopher Street Day) parade of the regional Lesbian, Gay, Bisexual, Transgender community in June, with up to 10,000 participants (since 1995).
- Stadtfest, a three-day festival of the city centre in August/September, comprises gastronomical offerings and rock and pop music performances on various stages.
- Oldenburg International Film Festival, a privately organised film festival in September, focused on independent film and film makers. The festival is funded through public subsidies and private sponsoring.
- Kramermarkt, fun fair at the Weser-Ems Halle on ten days in September/October. The tradition of this annual volksfest dates back to the 17th century, when the Kramermarkt was a market event at the end of the harvest.
- Oldenburger Kinder- und Jugendbuchmesse (KIBUM), an exhibition of new German language children's and youth literature, takes place over 11 days in November. A non-commercial fair organised by the city government in cooperation with the public library and the university library. In the course of the fair, a prize, the Kinder- und Jugendbuchpreis, is awarded to a debuting author or illustrator.

=== Points of interest ===
- Core city centre, large pedestrianized shopping destination for the region.
- Oldenburg State Theatre, oldest mainstream theatre in Oldenburg, first opened in 1833.
- Schloss Oldenburg in the city centre, until 1918 residence of the monarchic rulers of Oldenburg, today a museum. A public park, the Schlossgarten, is nearby.
- Weser-Ems Halle, exhibition and congress centre with outdoor fair area, located in Oldenburg Donnerschwee.
- Small EWE Arena and Large EWE Arena, two sports and event halls located near the main railway station, opened in 2005 and 2013, and seating up to 4,000 and 6,852 visitors respectively. The large arena is also home to the EWE Baskets Oldenburg basketball club.
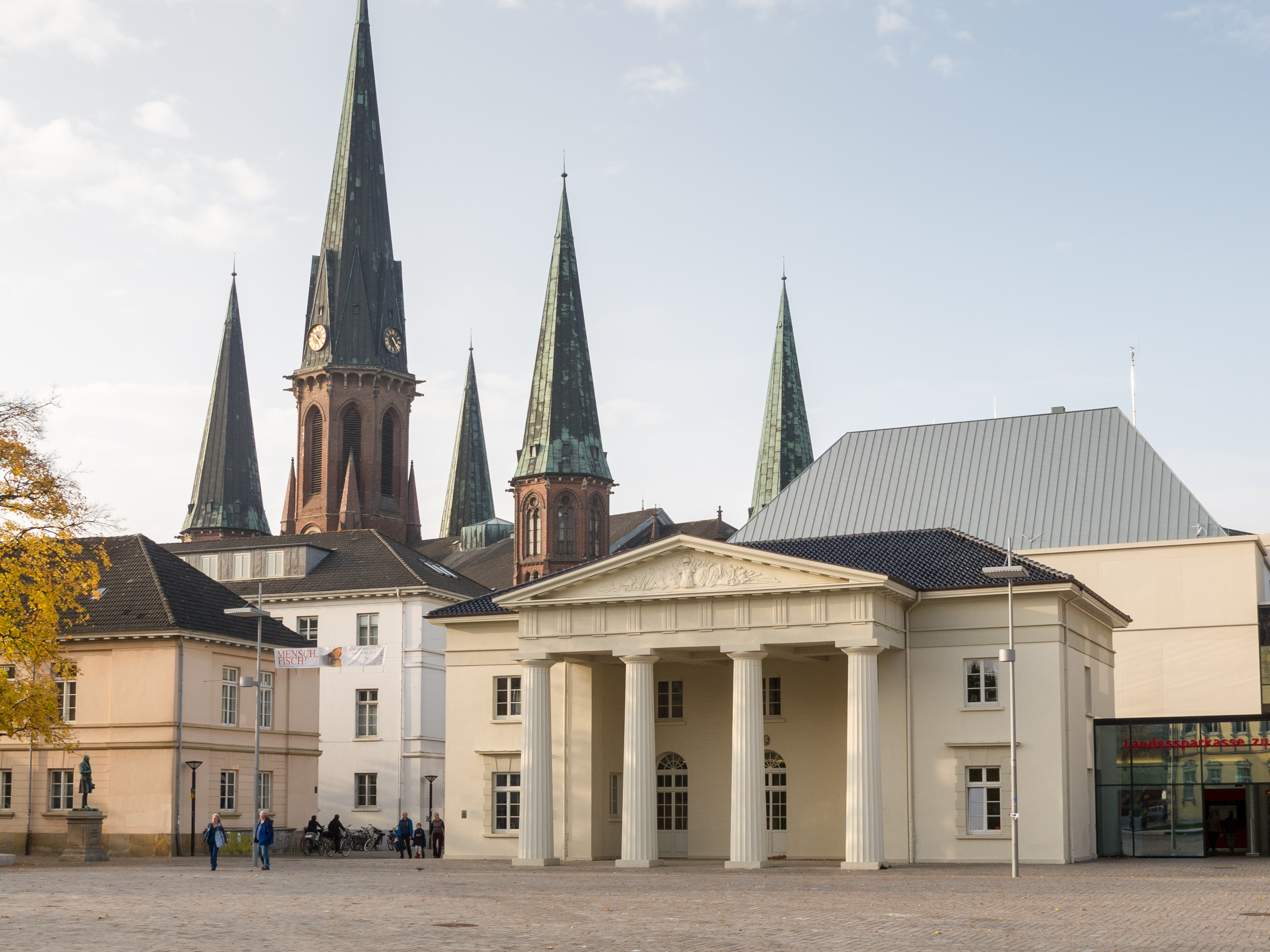
Castle square and Lambert's church

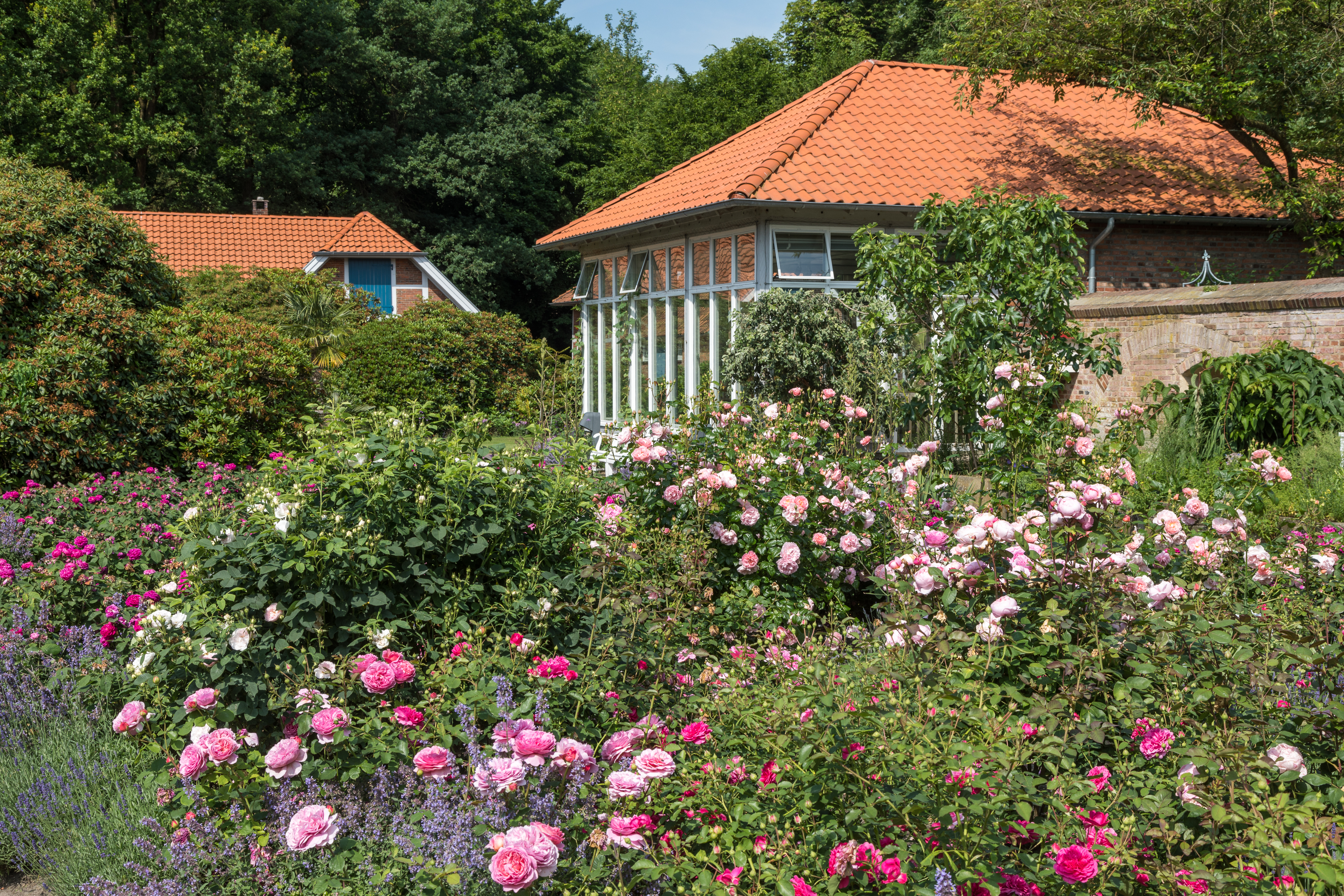
In the castle gardens

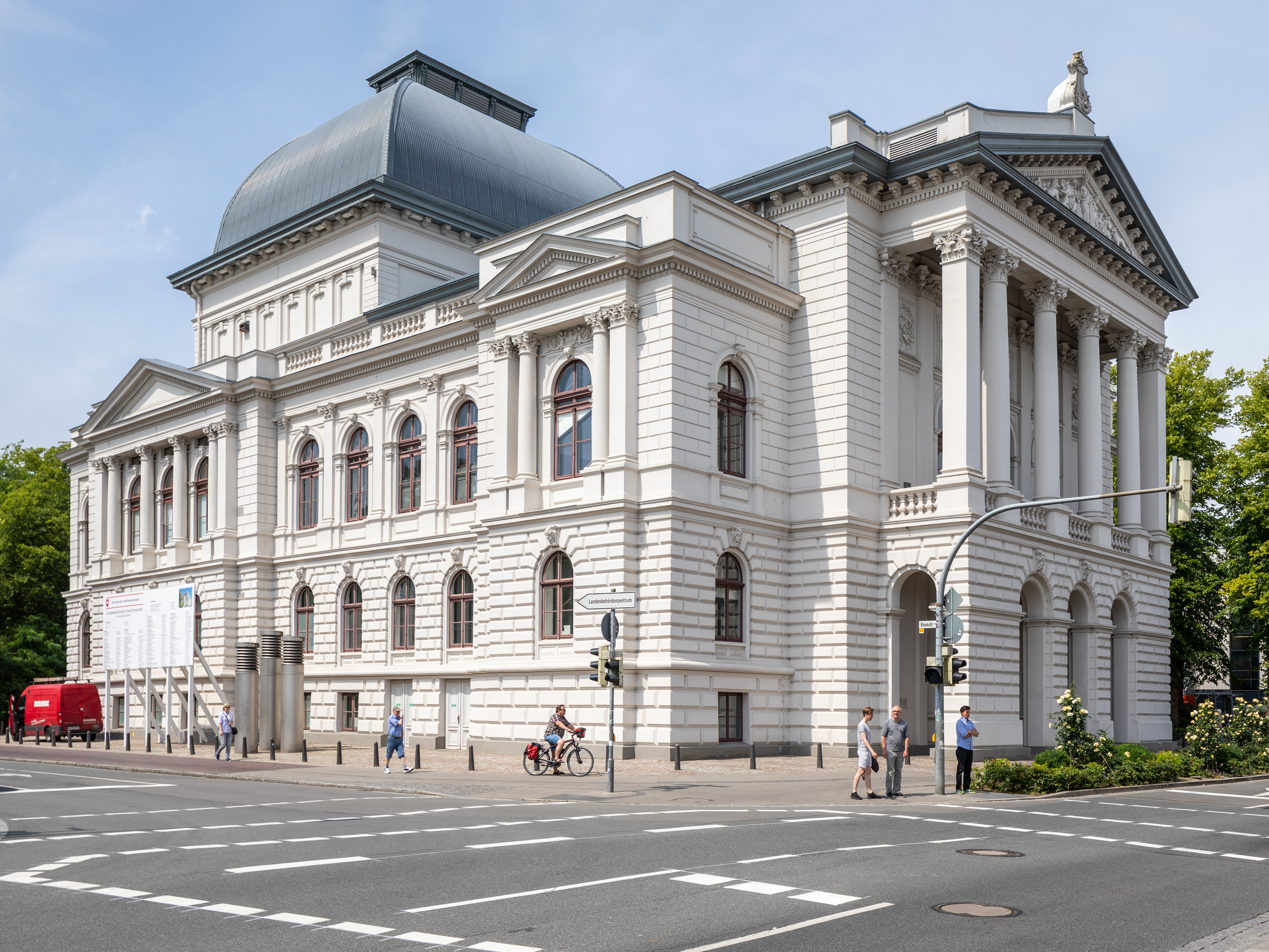
Oldenburg State Theatre

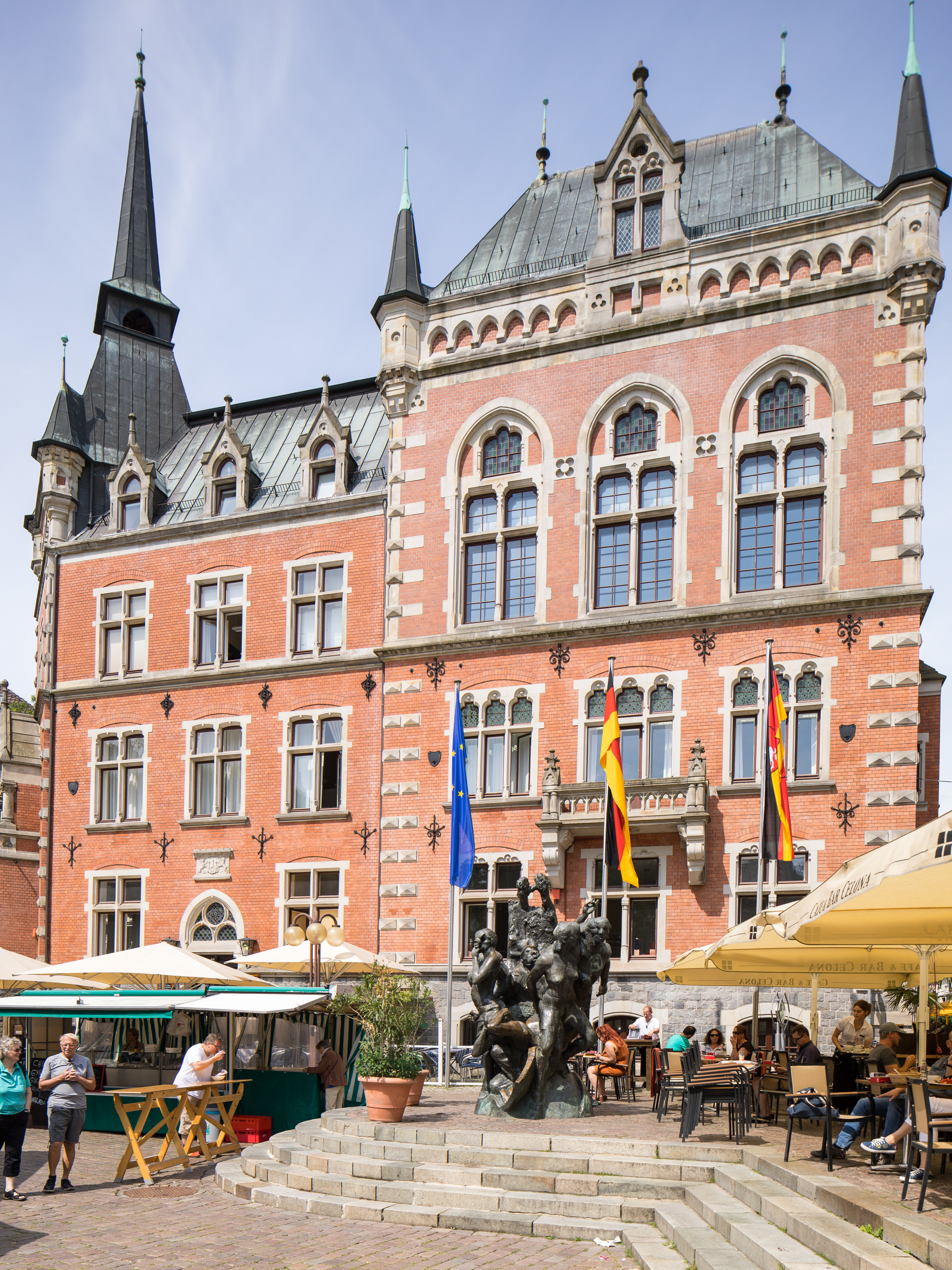
Town Hall (1886–88)

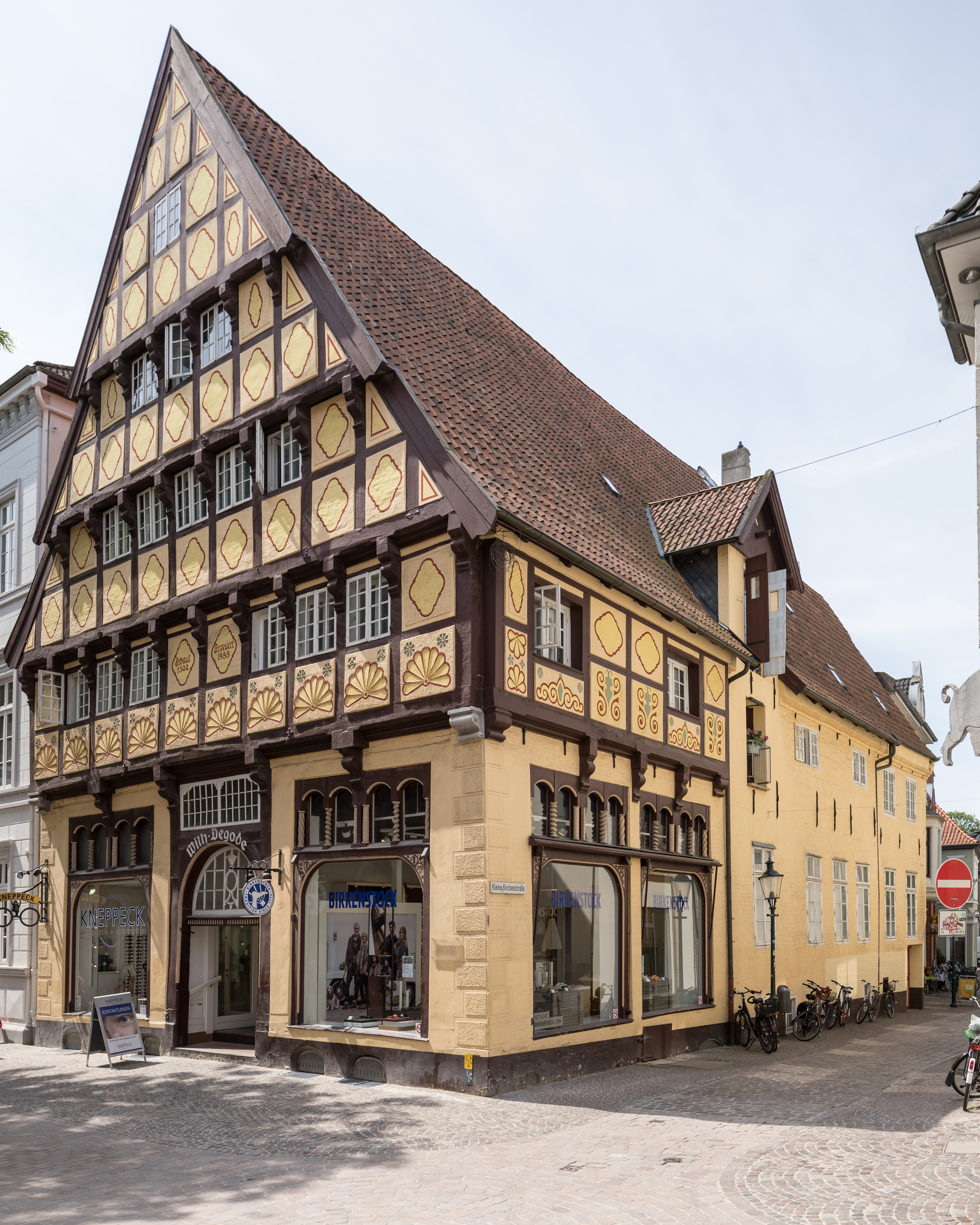
Degode House

=== Lutheran community ===
Oldenburg is the seat of administration and bishop of the Evangelical Lutheran Church in Oldenburg, whose preaching venue is the St Lamberti Church.

=== Jewish community ===
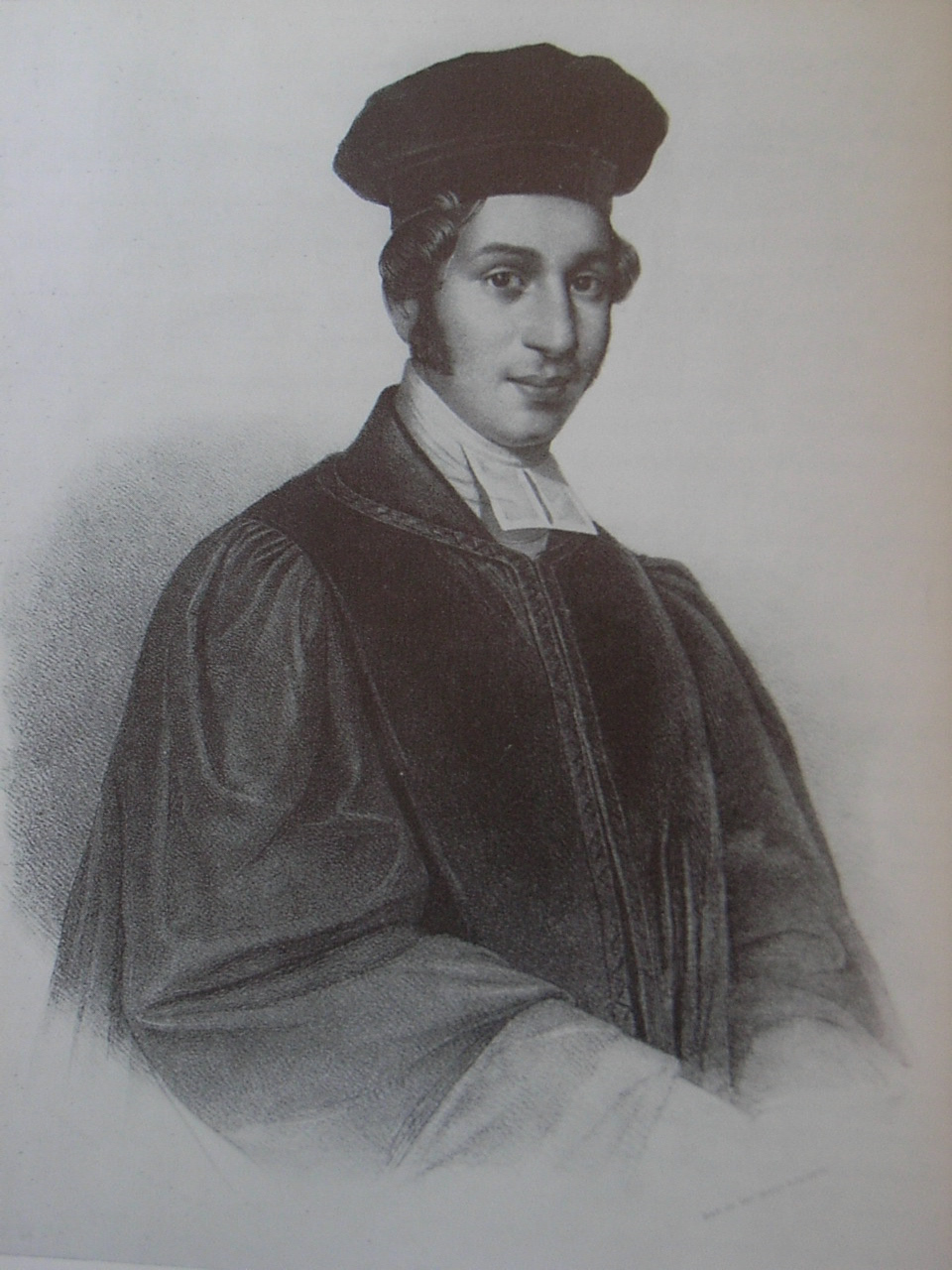
Nathan Marcus Adler, chief Rabbi of the Oldenburg Jewish community in the 19th century

The history of the Jewish community of Oldenburg dates back to the 14th century. Towards and during the 19th century, the Jews in Oldenburg were always around 1% of the total population, and by that time had acquired their own synagogue, cemetery and school. Most of them were merchants and businessmen. On 1938 Kristallnacht, the town men were led to Sachsenhausen concentration camp, among them Leo Trepp, the community Rabbi who survived and later became an honorary citizen of Oldenburg and honored by a street named after him. Since 1981 an annual commemoration walk (Erinnerungsgang) has been held by Oldenburg citizens in memory of the deportation of the Oldenburg Jews on November 10, 1938. Those who remained after 1938 emigrated to Canada, USA, United Kingdom, Holland or Mandatory Palestine.

After World War II, a group of survivors returned to the city and maintained a small community until it was dissolved during the 1970s. Nevertheless, due to Jewish emigration from the former USSR to Germany in the 1990s, a community of about 340 people is now maintaining its own synagogue, cemetery and other facilities. The old Jewish cemetery, which is no longer active after the opening of a new one, was desecrated twice in 2011 and 2013.

== Media ==
=== Print ===
- Nordwest-Zeitung (NWZ) Oldenburg-based daily newspaper, also provides local editions in neighbouring counties
- Free weekly newspapers delivered to households, mainly for ads and inserts: Hunte-Report (Wednesdays+Sundays), Sonntagszeitung (Sundays).
- Diabolo free weekly city magazine / listings magazine
- Mox free biweekly event listings magazine (from the same publisher as Diabolo)
- Alhambra-Zeitung bimonthly leftist, anti-fascist magazine
- Oldenburger Stachel local alternative magazine (discontinued)
- Oldenburgische Wirtschaft monthly magazine of the Oldenburg Chamber of Industry and Commerce (Industrie- und Handelskammer)

=== Radio and television ===
- Oldenburg Eins non-commercial public-access cable TV and radio station (live streams available online)
- Norddeutscher Rundfunk (NDR), public TV and radio broadcaster (part of the ARD), maintains a regional studio in Oldenburg.
- Radio FFN, commercial radio broadcaster, maintains a regional studio located in the NWZ building.

=== Online ===
- Nordwest-Zeitung TV Local video news clips published by the Nordwest-Zeitung

== Education ==
=== Tertiary education ===
There are two public universities in Oldenburg:

- The Carl von Ossietzky University of Oldenburg was founded in 1973 based on a previous college for teacher training, the Pädagogische Hochschule Oldenburg, which had a history in Oldenburg dating back to 1793. The university was officially named after Carl von Ossietzky in 1991. As of 2014, it has almost 13,746 students, a scientific staff of 1,130, as well as 964 technical and administrative staff. A new faculty of medicine and health sciences was established in 2012 as part of the newly founded European Medical School Oldenburg-Groningen, a cooperation with the University of Groningen (Netherlands) and local hospitals.
- The Jade University of Applied Sciences (Jade-Hochschule) The former Fachhochschule Oldenburg (until 1999) was founded in 1971, a merger of the previous engineering academy with the nautical college in Elsfleth. Oldenburg already had a history of construction engineering training dating back to 1882. Starting in 2000, the Fachhochschule had been part of multiple re-organisations involving several UAS (Fachhochschule) in the northwestern region. A relaunch under the name Jade-Hochschule took place in 2009 (previously: Fachhochschule Oldenburg/Ostfriesland/Wilhelmshaven). The Jade-Hochschule now comprises branches in three towns: Oldenburg, Elsfleth, and Wilhelmshaven. Based in Oldenburg are the departments of architecture, construction engineering and construction management, geodesy, as well as the institute of hearing aid technology and audiology. There are about 2,000 students in the Oldenburg branch. (The Elsfleth branch offers bachelor's degree courses in nautical science, international logistics, and harbour management. The Wilhelmshaven branch offers courses in engineering, business management, and media management.)

Privately managed institutions of higher education:

- Founded in 2004, the IBS IT & Business School Oldenburg (former Berufsakademie Oldenburg), a college of cooperative education, offers a B.Sc. degree course in business informatics and a B.A. degree course in business studies. The dual-system course combines practical vocational training at one of the partnering local companies with periods of academic studies.
- The Private Fachhochschule für Wirtschaft und Technik, a regional college of cooperative education, maintains a branch in Oldenburg offering bachelor's degree courses with integrated vocational training in electrical engineering and mechatronics.

Other:

- The Oldenburg branch of the Lower Saxony police academy (Polizeiakademie Niedersachsen) maintains a study facility in Oldenburg preparing candidates for a career in higher-middle-level or higher-level police service.

=== Primary and secondary education ===
- Gymnasium Graf-Anton-Guenther School
- Wirtschaftsgymnasium Oldenburg
- Cäcilienschule Oldenburg
- Liebfrauenschule Oldenburg
- Herbartgymnasium Oldenburg
- Altes Gymnasium Oldenburg
- Neues Gymnasium Oldenburg
- Gymnasium Eversten
- IGS Flötenteich
- Helene Lange Schule Oldenburg (IGS)
- Realschule Hochheider Weg
- Real- und Hauptschule Osternburg
- Realschule Ofenerdiek
- Kath. Grundschule Lerigauweg

== Sports ==
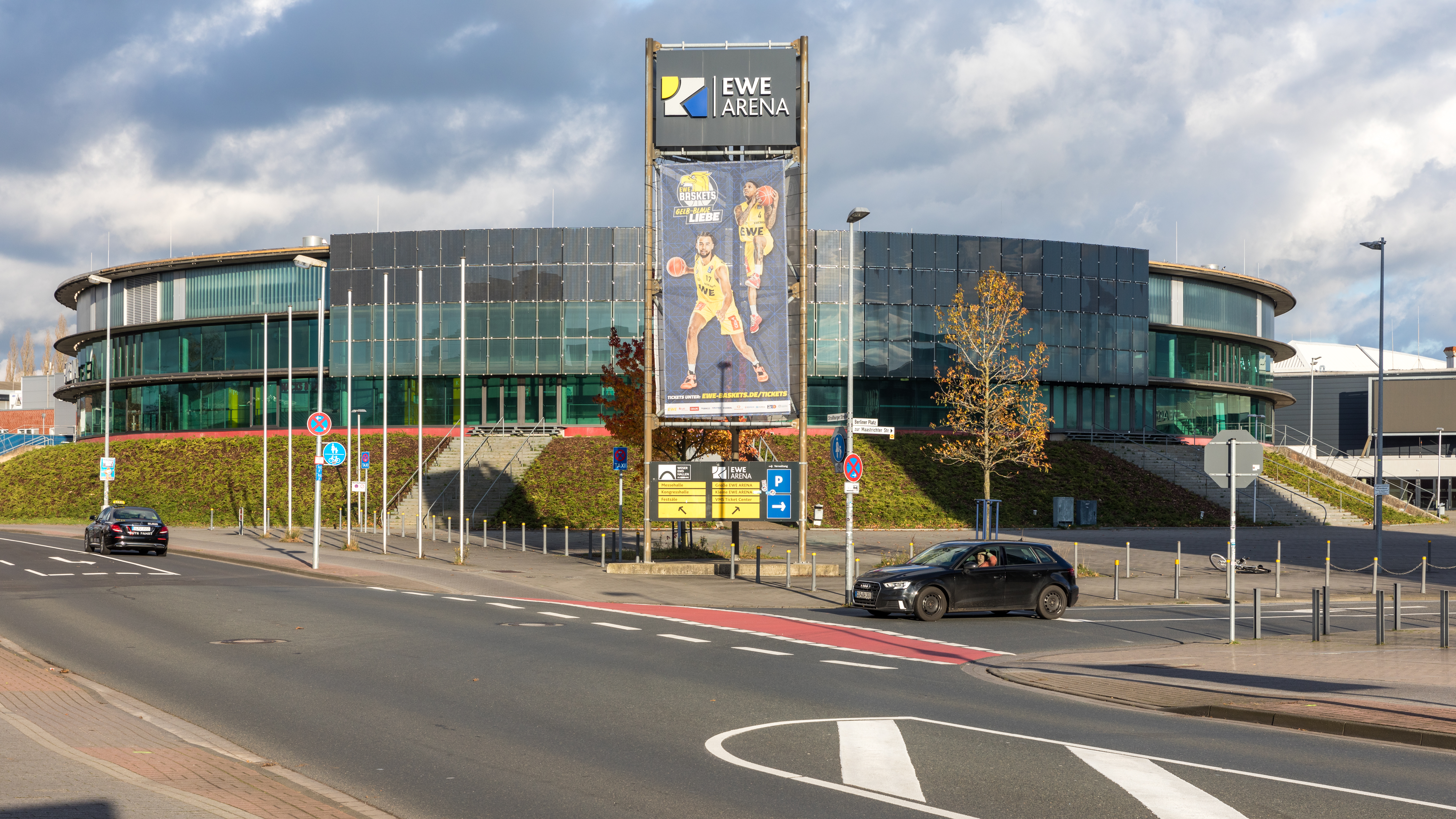
EWE-Arena

Oldenburg hosted the 2007 Fistball World Championship.

It has two football teams, VfB Oldenburg and VfL Oldenburg, who also have a handball section of the same name.

Moreover, Oldenburg is home to the basketball team EWE Baskets Oldenburg.

== Twin towns – sister cities ==
Oldenburg is twinned with:

- Høje-Taastrup, Denmark (1978)
- Cholet, France (1985)
- Groningen, Netherlands (1989)
- Makhachkala, Russia (1989)
- Rügen (district), Germany (1990)
- Mateh Asher, Israel (1996)
- Kingston upon Thames, England, United Kingdom (2010)
- Buffalo City, South Africa (2012)
- Qingdao, China (2014)
- Xi'an, China (2017)

== Notable people ==
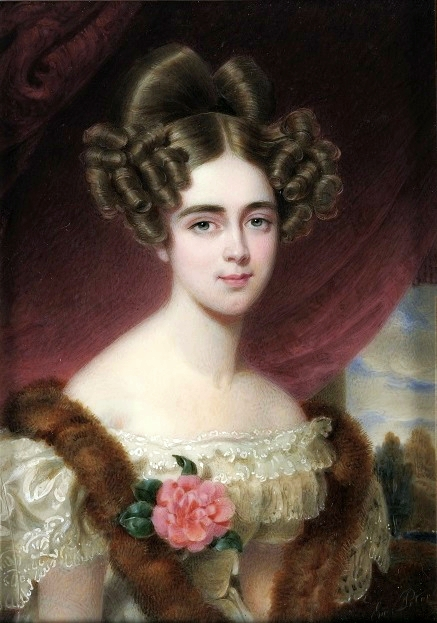
Princess Cecilia of Sweden, 1835

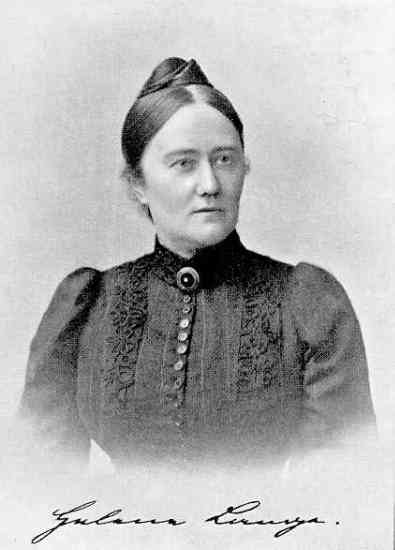
Helene Lange, 1899

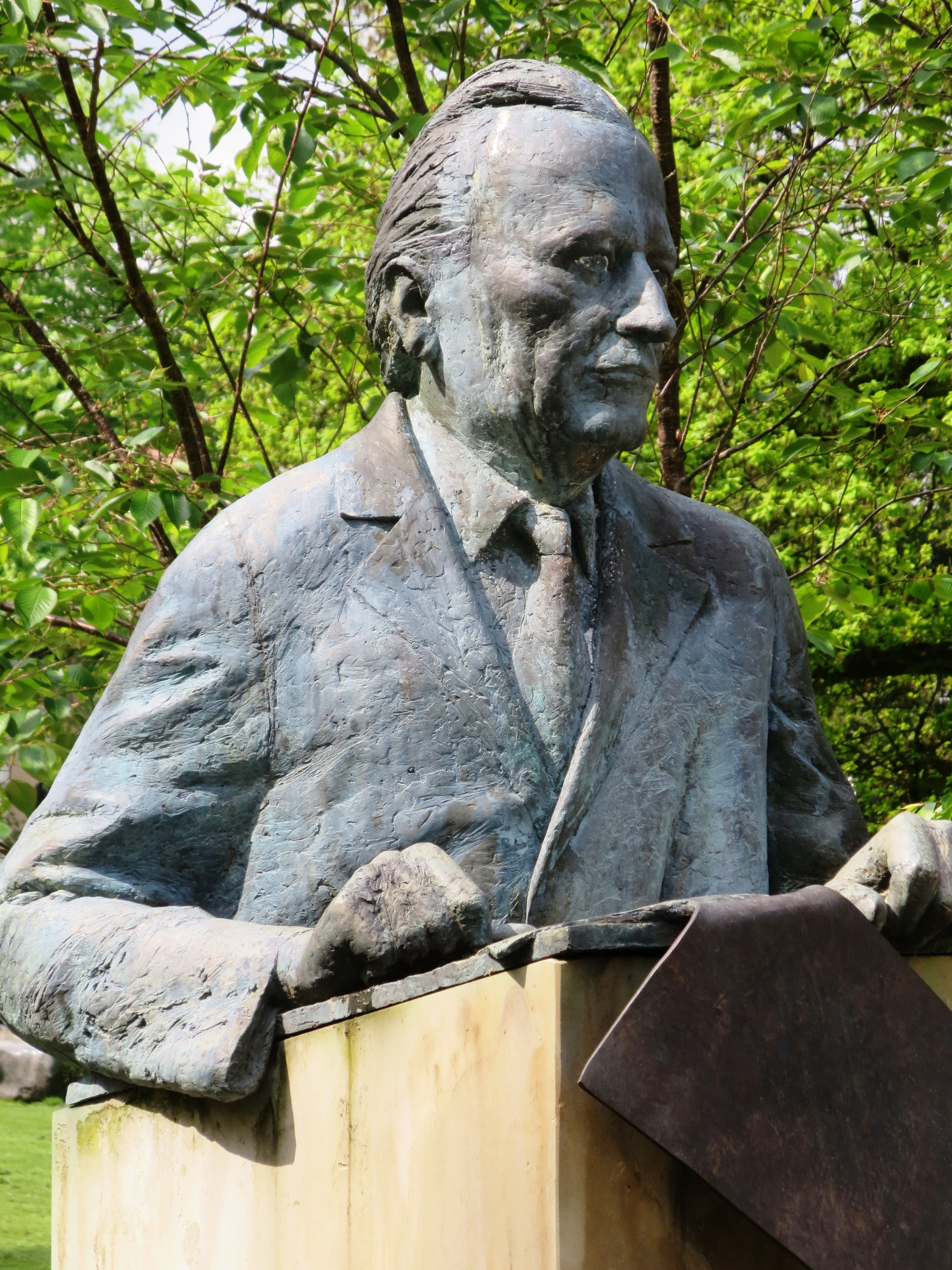
Karl Jaspers

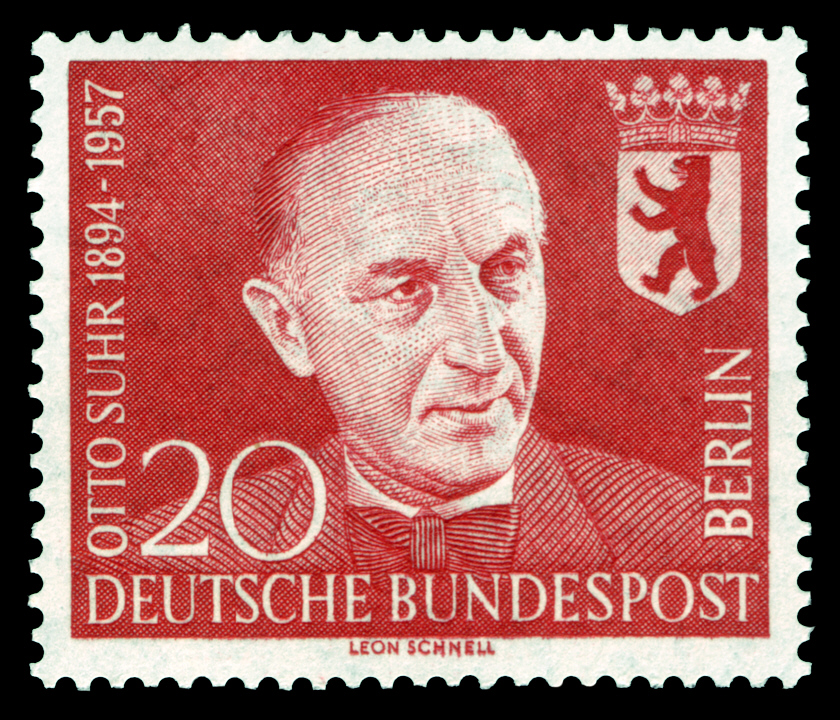
Otto Suhr, 1958

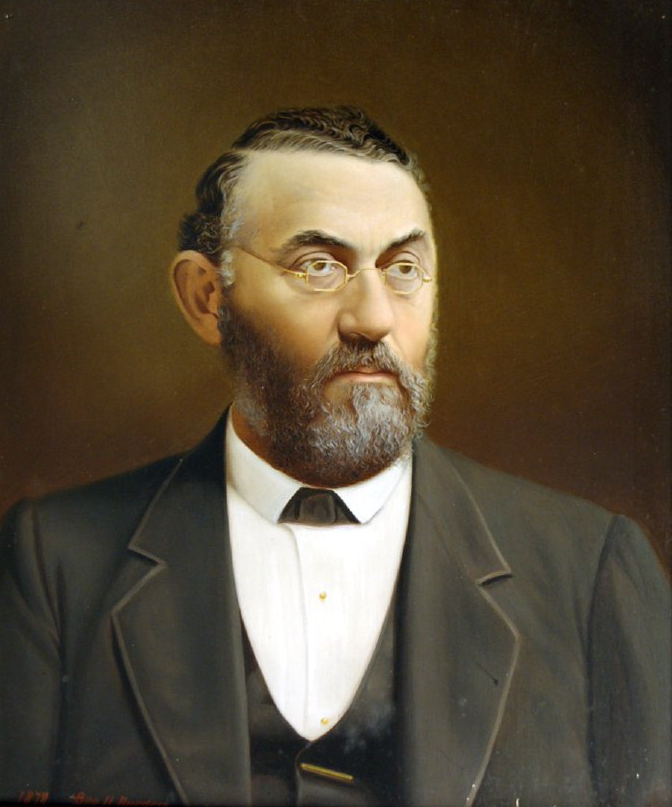
Isaac Friedlander, 1878

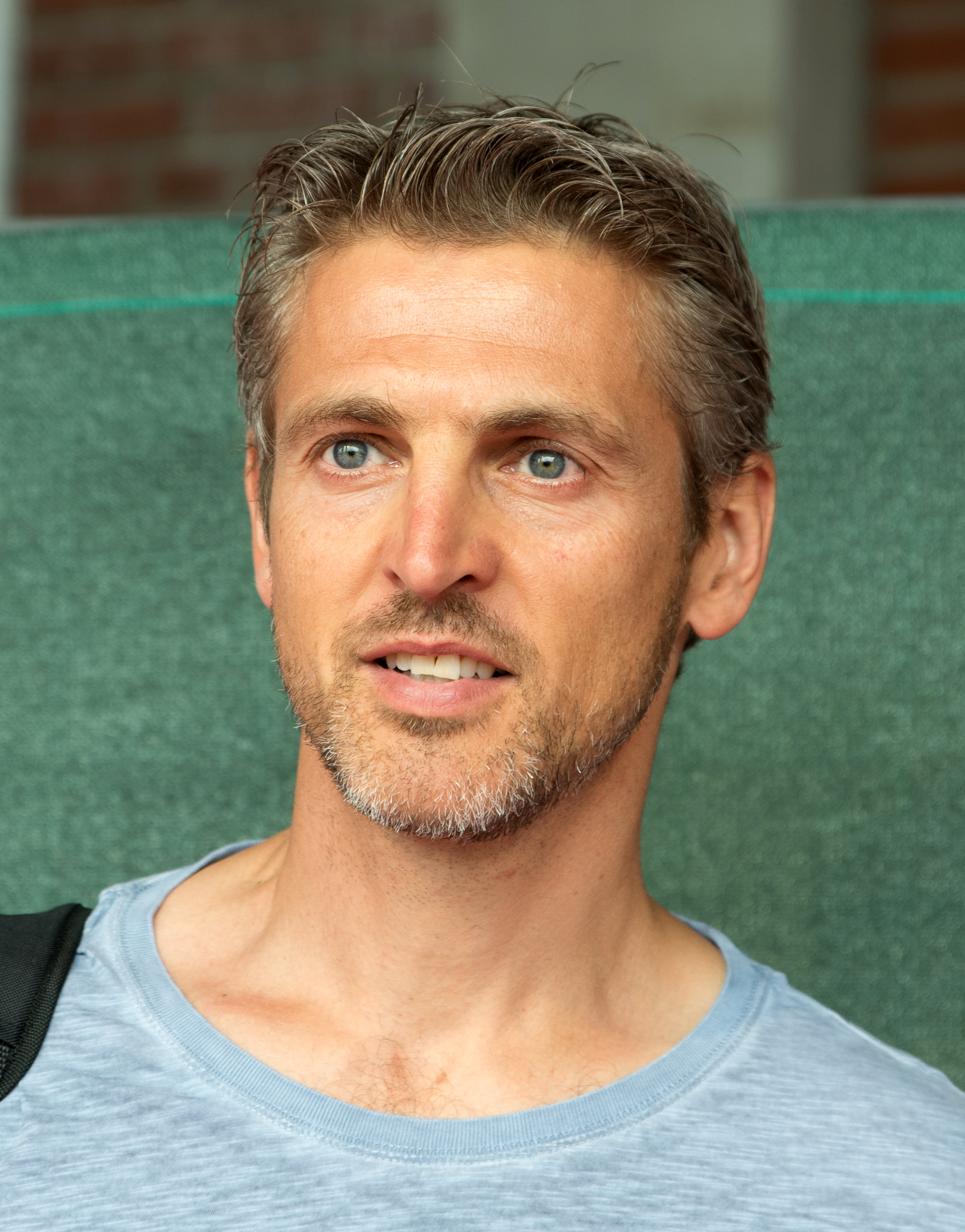
Hans-Jörg Butt, 2016

=== Public servants and public thinking ===
- Anna of Oldenburg (1501–1575), a Countess consort of East Frisia, spouse of Count Enno II of East Frisia.
- Princess Cecilia of Sweden (1807–1844), Princess of Sweden, died locally
- Amalia of Oldenburg (1818–1875), a Bavarian princess and Queen of Greece from 1836 to 1862.
- Karl von Wedel (1842–1919), a Prussian general and diplomat
- Helene Lange (1848–1930), politician, educator and suffragist
- Rudolf Heinze (1865–1928), jurist and politician; vice-chancellor of Germany, 1920/21
- Karl Jaspers (1883–1969), philosopher, psychiatrist and writer
- Otto Schultze (1884–1966), Generaladmiral with the Kriegsmarine during World War II
- Peter Suhrkamp (1891–1959), publisher and founder of the Suhrkamp Verlag
- Otto Suhr (1894–1957), politician and Governing Mayor of Berlin 1955/57
- Wilhelm Gideon (1898–1977), Nazi SS commandant of the Gross-Rosen concentration camp
- Hermann Ehlers (1904–1954), politician (CDU), Bundestag President, was a local landlord and died locally
- Hermann Behrends (1907–1948), Nazi SS officer executed for war crimes
- Heinz Rökker (1920–2018), WWII fighter pilot
- Ulrike Meinhof (1934–1976), journalist, far-left activist and co-founder of the Red Army Faction
- Bernd Althusmann (born 1966), politician (CDU)
- Thyra von Westernhagen (born 1973), Hanoverian princess by marriage
- Hasnain Kazim (born 1974), journalist

=== Arts ===
- Martin Zaagmolen (buried 1669), Dutch painter
- Sophie Löwe (1815–1866), opera soprano.
- Christian Griepenkerl (1839–1916), painter and professor at the Academy of Fine Arts Vienna
- August Jerndorff (1846–1906), Danish painter, known for his portraits.
- Ellen Plessow (1891–1967), German actress in films from 1922 to 1957
- Friedrich W. Herzog (1902-1976), German writer and music critic
- Erna Schlüter (1904–1969), operatic dramatic soprano
- Jürgen Goslar (born 1927), actor and director
- Thomas Schmidt-Kowalski (1949–2013), composer
- Klaus Modick (born 1951), author and literary translator
- Rena Niehaus (born 1954), film actress
- Thomas Schütte (born 1954), sculptor and draftsman
- Heiko Daxl (1957–2012), media artist and curator
- Andrea Clausen (born 1959), stage actress, member of the Burgtheater ensemble
- Sarah Nemtsov (née Reuter, born 1980), composer
- Klaas Heufer-Umlauf (born 1983), TV host, producer, actor and singer.

=== Science & business ===
- Otto Mencke (1644–1707), philosopher and scientist.
- Arp Schnitger (1648–1719), organ builder
- Wilhelm Heinrich Schüßler (1821–1898), medical doctor and naturopath
- Isaac Friedlander (1823–1878), American wheat broker and California land speculator
- Lothar Meyer (1830–1895), chemist, studied here
- Reinhard Schlichting (1835–1897), American manufacturer and politician in Wisconsin
- August Brauer (1863–1917), zoologist, studied deep-sea ichthyology
- Carl Ramsauer (1879–1955), professor and research physicist, discovered the Ramsauer–Townsend effect.
- Walter Behrmann (1882–1955), geographer; introduced a cylindrical map projection "Behrmann projection"
- Hans Günther Aach (1919–1999), botanist
- Manfred Milinski (born 1950), biologist and formerly a director of the Max Planck Institute
- Thomas Reiter (born 1958), retired European astronaut, Air Force Brigadier General, lives locally

=== Sport ===
- Uta Frommater (born 1948), swimmer, team bronze medallist at the 1968 Summer Olympics
- Karsten Baumann (born 1969), football player and manager, played 389 games
- Hans-Jörg Butt (born 1974), footballer, played 479 games and 4 for Germany
- Oliver Köhrmann (born 1976), handball player
- Florian Bruns (born 1979), football coach and former player who played 369 games
- Johannes Bitter (born 1982), handball player, goalkeeper for Germany
- Thomas Plößel (born 1988), sailor, twice team bronze medallist at the 2016 and 2020 Summer Olympics.

=== Others ===
- Diedrich A. W. Rulfs (1848–1926), German-American architect

== See also ==
- Route of Megalithic Culture – tourist route from Osnabrück to Oldenburg via some 33 Megalithic sites
