= Große EWE Arena =

Indoor sporting complex in Oldenburg, Germany

Coordinates: 53°08′49″N 8°13′36″E

Große EWE Arena Large EWE Arena
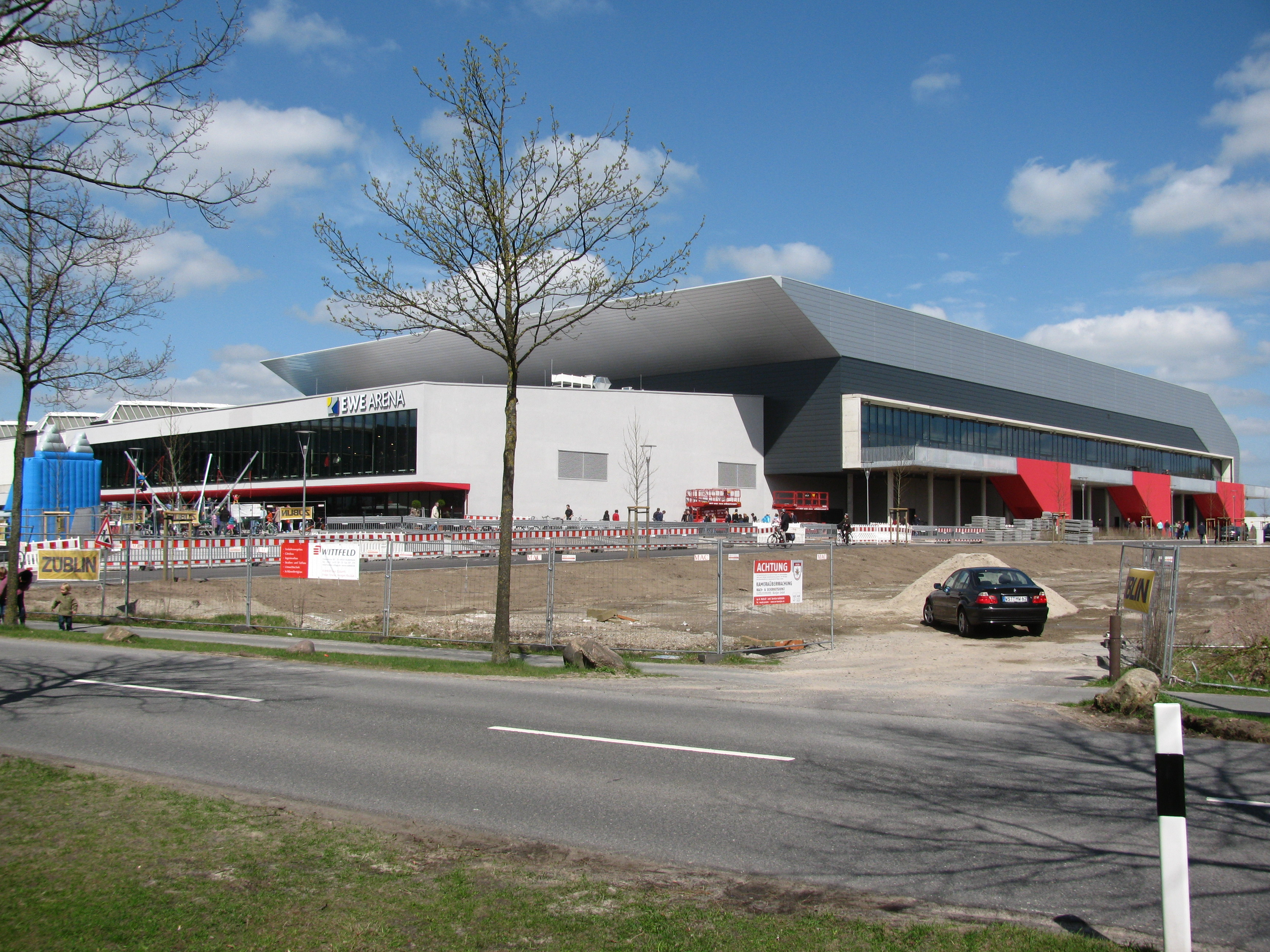
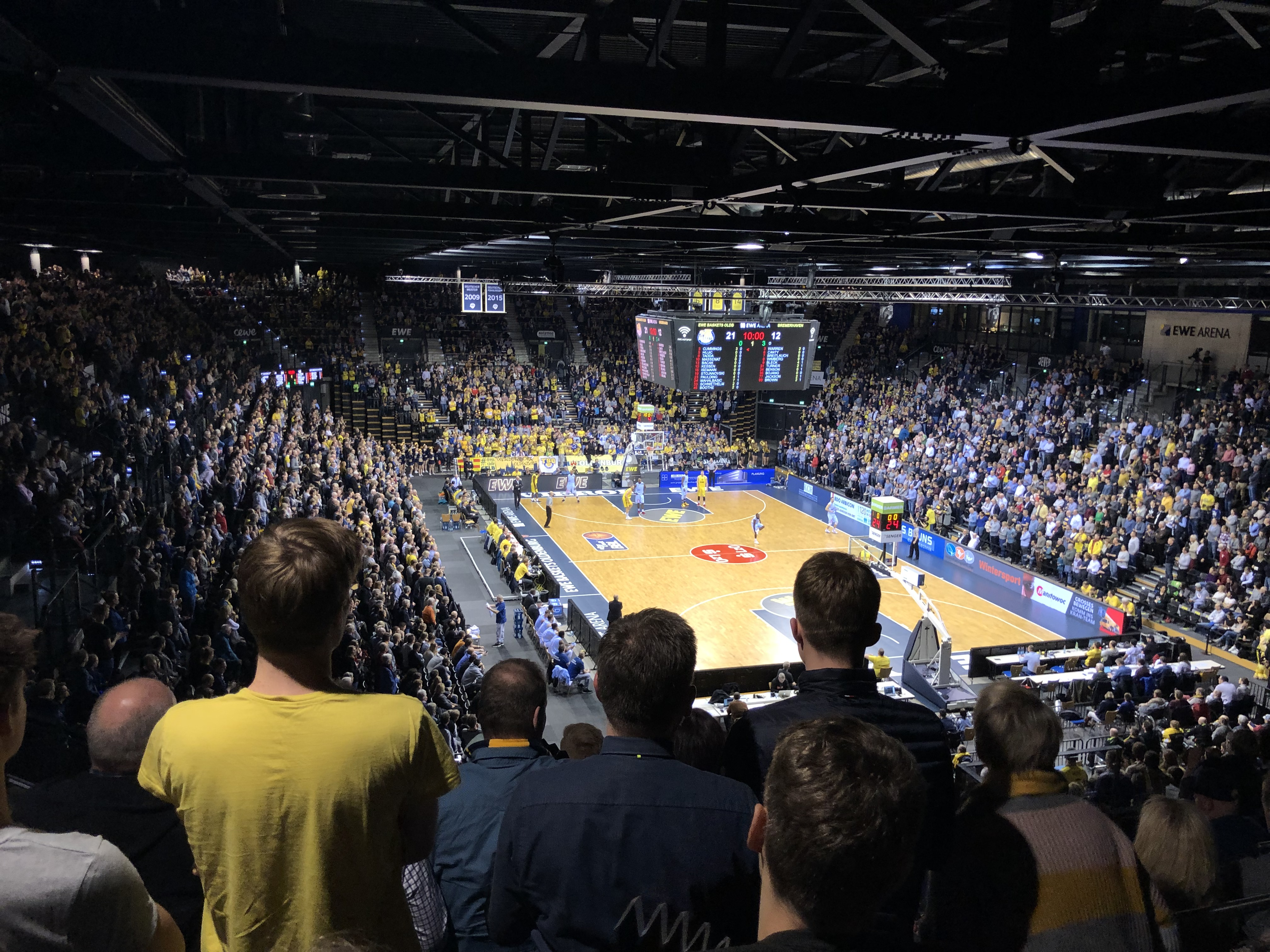
- Interactive map of Große EWE Arena; Large EWE Arena
- Location: Oldenburg, Lower Saxony; Germany
- Owner: City of Oldenburg
- Capacity: Concerts: 8,000; Boxing: 7,396; Basketball: 6,069; Handball: 5,532; Equestrianism: 4,228
- Surface: Parquet

Construction
- Groundbreaking: 2012
- Opened: 2013
- Cost: €38.6 million

Tenants
- EWE Baskets Oldenburg (basketball) (2013–present)

Große EWE Arena, or Grosse EWE Arena, (English: Large EWE Arena) is a dual indoor sporting arena complex in Oldenburg, Germany. It is a part of the Weser-Ems Halle multi-sporting complex, which contains two main sports arena halls, the small Kleine EWE Arena, and the large Große EWE Arena. The facility's name comes from a sponsorship arrangement with the German energy and telecommunications company EWE.

The Große EWE arena has a seating capacity of 8,000 for concerts, 7,396 for boxing matches, 6,200 for basketball games, 5,532 for handball games, and 4,228 for equestrian competitions.

It is the home arena of the professional basketball team EWE Baskets Oldenburg, of the German League.
