= Isaac Friedlander =

Wheat broker and California land speculator

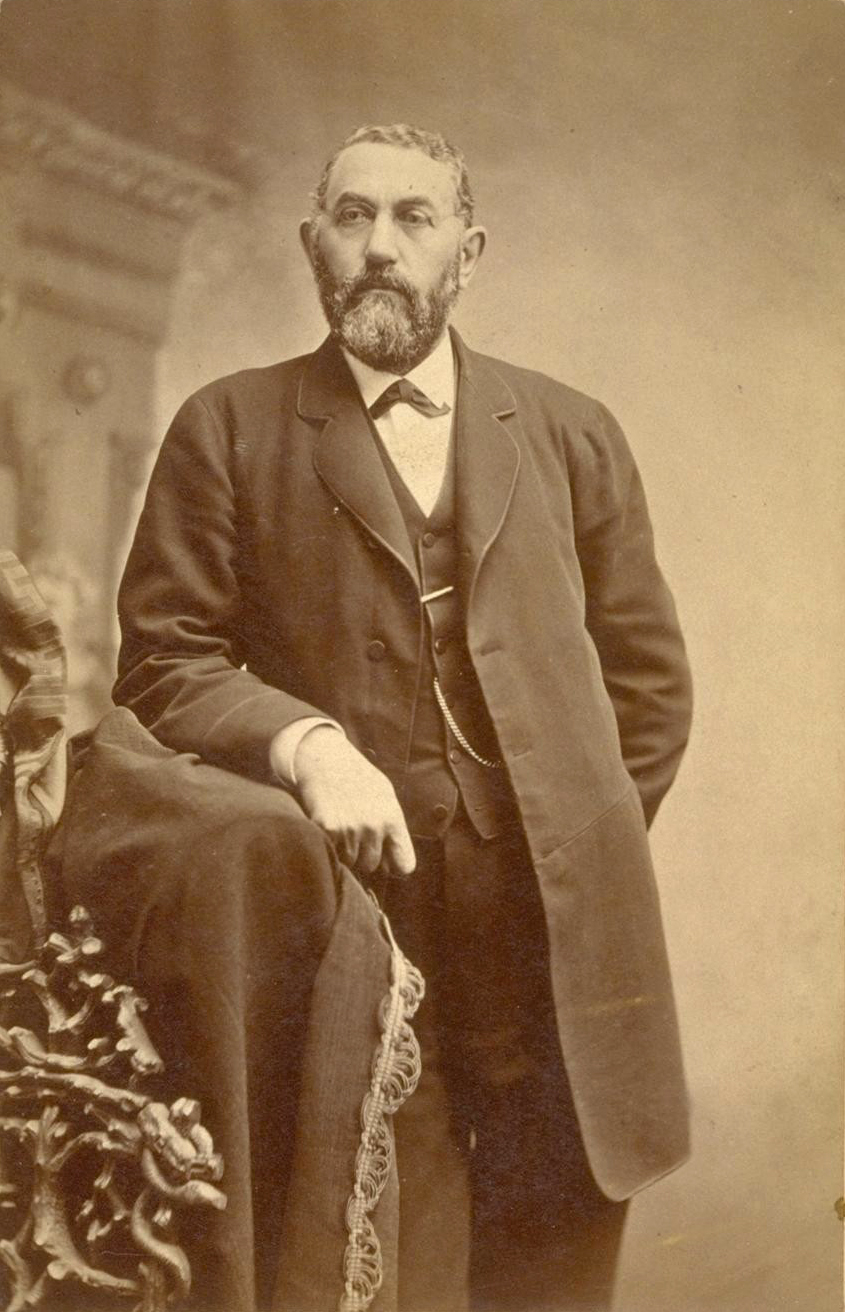
- Born: c. 1823; Oldenburg, Germany
- Died: 1878; San Francisco, CA, United States
- Occupations: Grain merchant, "Wheat King" of California
- Known for: Pioneering modern information, production and transportation technology in the California wheat business

Isaac Friedlander (c. 1823–1878) was a wheat broker and major early California land speculator who was known as the Wheat King or the Grain King.

== Biography ==
Friedlander was born in Oldenburg, Germany, but as a child moved to Charleston, South Carolina, where he spent his boyhood. In 1849, he moved to California during the gold rush. He had poor luck mining in Yuba County, but within a few years he went into mercantile trade and was able to corner the market on flour for the mining camps. Even that venture failed one time, but through his personal reputation for honesty in business he was able to maintain his credit and build the business back up.

At the end of the Civil War, the economy in the United States re-stabilized and simultaneously California started to produce a surplus of wheat beyond the needs of west coast markets. Friedlander and other producers experimented with shipping to Pacific rim countries, but by coincidence weather-related crop failures in Great Britain created excess demand there. Although the British Isles were only accessible via a long, difficult trip around Cape Horn, Friedlander learned to take advantage of new technologies. One was a fast new clipper ship, called the Down Easter, which was particularly suited to cargo such as wheat, and could make the trip to England in about 100 days. He also utilized the telegraph, especially the newly laid trans-Atlantic telegraph, over which he was able to coordinate information about available vessels to ship the crop in a timely manner. Within a few years, California became a major supplier of flour and wheat to Great Britain.

Friedlander built grain elevators and grist mills, employed the most modern large scale mechanized farming practices on the farms he owned, was a backer and promoter of California's first irrigation canal, and bought hundreds of thousands of acres of land in California's Central Valley. Beyond his business enterprises, Friedlander's involvement in public life included being water commissioner, one of the original regents of the University of California, and a several term vice-president and president of the San Francisco Chamber of Commerce.

Friedlander was Jewish, part of a group of Jewish immigrants to the early Bay Area who considered the opportunities presented by the young state to be somewhat of a "promised land." In personal descriptions, his biographers never fail to mention that he was a large man, 6 feet 7 inches. Friedlander and his South Carolina-born wife Priscilla were known for their parties in which they brought a flavor of "Old South" culture to San Francisco. At the time of his death, he was survived by five children.

Friedlander had financial setbacks in 1877, related to a crop failure. In the summer of 1878 he died of a heart failure that some thought was brought on by the stress of managing his business on a day-to-day basis in general, and the crop failure in particular. However he left a legacy of business methods such that California wheat production remained a major industry for another twenty-five years.
