= Diedrich A. W. Rulfs =

American architect (1848-1926)

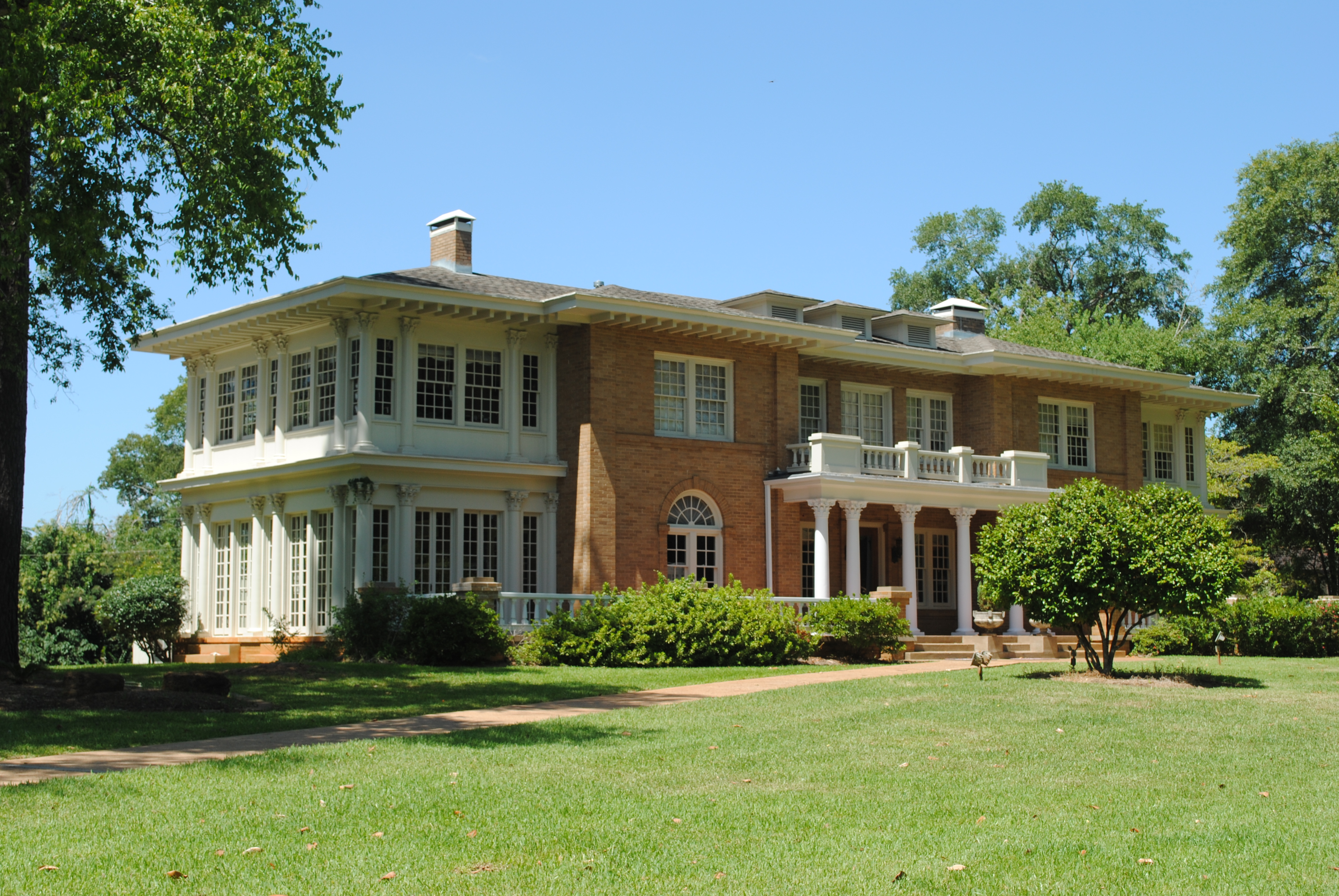
Eugene H. Blount House

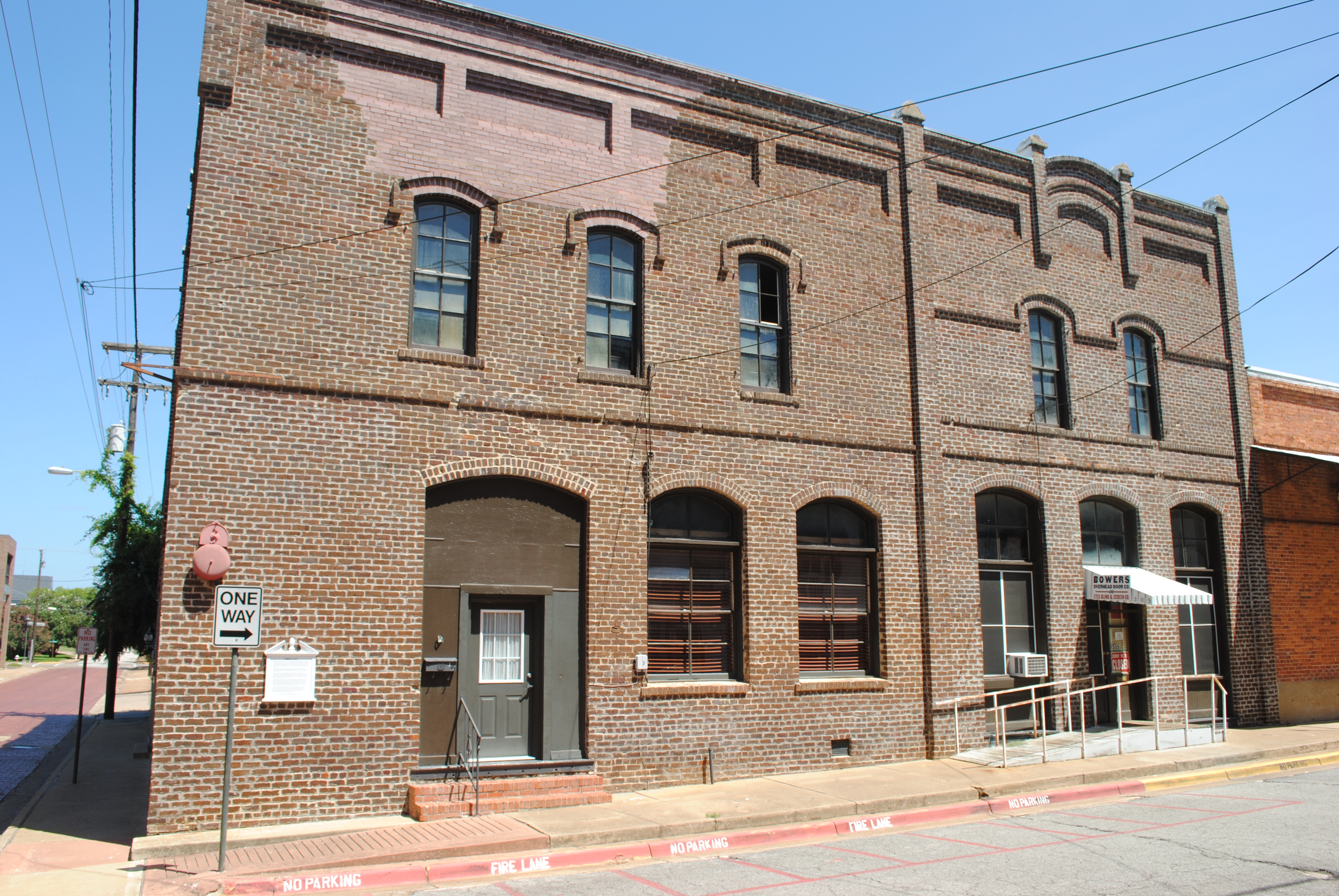
Old Cotton Exchange Building

Diedrich Anton Wilhelm Rulfs (March 6, 1848 – February 14, 1926) was a German-American architect in Nacogdoches, Texas. Rulfs "is aptly called Nacogdoches' master architect for his work in the city between 1879 and 1926."

Rulfs was born in Oldenburg, Grand Duchy of Oldenburg. A number of his works are listed on the National Register of Historic Places.

Works include (with attribution):

- Eugene H. Blount House, built 1923, at 1801 North St. Nacogdoches, Texas (Rulfs, Dietrich A.W.), NRHP-listed
- Stephen William and Mary Price Blount House, built 1897, at 310 N. Mound St. Nacogdoches, Texas (Rulfs, Dietrich), NRHP-listed
- Old Cotton Exchange Building, 305 E. Commerce St. Nacogdoches, Texas (Rulfs, Dietrich A.W.), NRHP-listed
- Maria A. Davidson Apartments, 214 S. Fredonia St. Nacogdoches, Texas (Rulfs, Dietrich A.W.), NRHP-listed
- Roland Jones House, 141 N. Church St. Nacogdoches, Texas (Rulfs, Dietrich A.W.), NRHP-listed
- One or more works in the Nacogdoches Downtown Historic District, roughly bounded by Southern Pacific RR tracks, Banita Cr., Pilar, Mound, Arnold, North, and Hospital streets, Nacogdoches, Texas (Rulfs, Dietrich), NRHP-listed
- James I. and Myrta Blake Perkins House, 303 E. 5th St. Rusk, Texas (Rulfs, Dietrich A.W.), NRHP-listed
- One or more works in Sterne-Hoya Historic District, 100—200 blocks of S. Lanana St., 500 block of E. Main St. (S side), 500 block of E. Pilar St. Nacogdoches, Texas (Rulfs, Dietrich A.W.), NRHP-listed
- One or more works in the Virginia Avenue Historic District, 500 block of Bremond (W side), 500—1800 blocks of Virginia Ave., 521 Weaver Nacogdoches, Texas (Rulfs, Dietrich A.W.), NRHP-listed
- One or more works in the Washington Square Historic District, roughly bounded by Houston, Logansport, N. Lanana, E. Hospital and N. Fredonia streets, Nacogdoches, Texas (Rulfs, Dietrich A.W.), NRHP-listed
- One or more works in the Zion Hill Historic District, roughly bounded by Park Street, Lanana Cr., Oak Grove Cemetery, and N. Lanana Street Nacogdoches, Texas (Rulfs, Dietrich A.W.), NRHP-listed
