= Eurocup 2013–14 Regular Season Group D =

Standings and Results for Group D of the Regular Season phase of the 2013–14 Eurocup basketball tournament.

== Standings ==
	Team	Pld	W	L	PF	PA	Diff	Tie-break
1.	(Germany) Alba Berlin	10	8	2	749	669	+80	
2.	(France) BCM Gravelines	10	6	4	749	690	+59	1–1 (+5)
3.	(Spain) CAI Zaragoza	10	6	4	803	719	+84	1–1 (–5)
4.	(Germany) Telekom Baskets Bonn	10	5	5	785	805	–20	
5.	(Italy) Acea Roma	10	3	7	761	777	–16	
6.	(Belgium) Belfius Mons-Hainaut	10	2	8	620	807	–187	

Source: Euroleague Basketball

== Fixtures and results ==
=== Game 1 ===
15 October 2013
19:30 CET

Boxscore

Telekom Baskets Bonn (Germany)	65–86	(Germany) Alba Berlin
Scoring by quarter: 15–25, 13–25, 14–23, 23–13
Pts: McLean, Veikalas 14; Rebs: Zavackas 5 Asts: Jordan 4		Pts: Logan 20; Rebs: Jagla, Radošević 5 Asts: Hammonds, Radošević 5

Telekom Dome, Bonn
Attendance: 3,200
Referees: Luigi Lamonica (ITA), Saso Petek (SLO), Alex Olaru (ROU)

15 October 2013
20:30 CET

Boxscore

CAI Zaragoza (Spain)	73–56	(Belgium) Belfius Mons-Hainaut
Scoring by quarter: 23-13, 22-7, 16-21, 12-15
Pts: Rudež 16; Rebs: Shermadini 10; Asts: Stefansson 4		Pts: Love 15; Rebs: Love 11; Asts: Battle 5

Pabellón Príncipe Felipe, Zaragoza
Attendance: 6,200
Referees: Tolga Sahin (ITA), Anastasios Piloidis (GRE), Marcin Kowalski (POL)

16 October 2013
21:00

Boxscore

Acea Roma (Italy)	69–75	(France) BCM Gravelines
Scoring by quarter: 13–23, 20–19, 18–20, 18–13
Pts: Hosley 19; Rebs: Mbakwe 7 Asts: Goss 3		Pts: M'Baye 17; Rebs: Lewis 7 Asts: Diabate 5

Palatiziano, Rome
Attendance: 1,666
Referees: Rustu Nuran (ROU), Gentian Cici (ALB), Benjamin Jimenez (ESP)

=== Game 2 ===
22 October 2013
20:30 CET

Boxscore

Belfius Mons-Hainaut (Belgium)	76–88	(Italy) Acea Roma
Scoring by quarter: 20–18, 24–22, 16–26, 16–22
Pts: Stitt 16; Rebs: Cage 8 Asts: Stitt 7		Pts: Taylor 22; Rebs: Mbakwe 12; Asts: Taylor 5

Mons Arena, Mons
Attendance: 1,960
Referees: Ilija Belosevic (SRB), Alexey Davydov (RUS), Markos Michaelides (GRE)

23 October 2013
20:00 CET

Boxscore

BCM Gravelines (France)	74–66	(Germany) Telekom Baskets Bonn
Scoring by quarter: 17–17, 28–12, 15–20, 14–17
Pts: Diawara, Lewis 16; Rebs: Camara 9 Asts: Diabate 3		Pts: Veikalas 18; Rebs: Zavackas, McLean 8 Asts: Jordan 9

Sportica, Gravelines
Attendance: 2,500
Referees: Marek Cmikiewicz (POL), Arnis Ozols (LAT), Aleksandar Glisic (SRB)

23 October 2013
20:00 CET

Boxscore

Alba Berlin (Germany)	71–68	(Spain) CAI Zaragoza
Scoring by quarter: 15–21, 21–16, 19–20, 16–11
Pts: Logan 18; Rebs: Kendall 10; Asts: Redding 4		Pts: Shermadini 14; Rebs: Jones, Shermadini 6 Asts: Tabu 4

O2 World, Berlin
Attendance: 7,779
Referees: Jakub Zamojski (POL), Marko Juras (SRB), Tomislav Vovk (CRO)

=== Game 3 ===
29 October 2013
20:00 CET

Boxscore

BCM Gravelines (France)	75–52	(Belgium) Belfius Mons-Hainaut
Scoring by quarter: 19–13, 23–11, 10–18, 23–10
Pts: Johnson 19; Rebs: Camara 11; Asts: Diabate 7		Pts: Cage 16; Rebs: Love 10; Asts: Stitt 4

Sportica, Gravelines
Attendance: 2,500
Referees: Emilio Perez Pizarro (ESP), Moritz Reiter (GER), Piotr Pastusiak (POL)

29 October 2013
20:45 CET

Boxscore

Acea Roma (Italy)	85–71	(Germany) Alba Berlin
Scoring by quarter: 24–13, 20–12, 24–24, 17–22
Pts: Hosley 20; Rebs: Mbakwe 9 Asts: three players 4		Pts: Hammonds, Stojanovski 12; Rebs: Wohlfarth-Bottermann 6 Asts: Hammonds, Logan 3

Palatiziano, Rome
Attendance: 1,731
Referees: Jose Ramon Garcia Ortiz (ESP), Ioannis Foufis (GRE), Mario Majkic (SLO)

30 October 2013
19:30 CET

Boxscore

Telekom Baskets Bonn (Germany)	108–104	(Spain) CAI Zaragoza
Scoring by quarter: 25–29, 19–25, 35–31, 29–10
Pts: Veikalas 19; Rebs: McLean 9 Asts: Jordan 8		Pts: Rudež, Sanikidze 16; Rebs: Sanikidze 6 Asts: Llompart 9

Telekom Dome, Bonn
Attendance: 4,530
Referees: Luis Lopes (POR), Regis Bardera (FRA), Aleksandar Milojevic (FYR)

=== Game 4 ===
5 November 2013
20:00 CET

Boxscore

Alba Berlin (Germany)	70–59	(France) BCM Gravelines
Scoring by quarter: 25–24, 17–14, 8–6, 20–15
Pts: Logan 17; Rebs: Kendall 8 Asts: Hammonds 3		Pts: Holland 16; Rebs: Lewis 9 Asts: three players 2

O2 World, Berlin
Attendance: 7,110
Referees: Boris Shulga (UKR), Ingus Baumanis (LAT), Semen Ovinov (RUS)

6 November 2013
19:30 CET

Boxscore

Telekom Baskets Bonn (Germany)	74–63	(Belgium) Belfius Mons-Hainaut
Scoring by quarter: 23–16, 17–15, 16–17, 18–15
Pts: McLean 23; Rebs: Looby 6 Asts: Jordan 6		Pts: Love 18; Rebs: Love 9 Asts: Battle, Muya Muboyayi 3

Telekom Dome, Bonn
Attendance: 4,170
Referees: Andrej Lovsin (SLO), Francisco Araña (ESP), Josip Radojkovic (CRO)

6 November 2013
20:30 CET

Boxscore

CAI Zaragoza (Spain)	74–68	(Italy) Acea Roma
Scoring by quarter: 21–9, 13–22, 20–20, 20–17
Pts: Jones 17; Rebs: Jones 9 Asts: three players 3		Pts: Baron 14; Rebs: Mbakwe 8 Asts: Goss 4

Pabellón Príncipe Felipe, Zaragoza
Attendance: 7,638
Referees: Joseph Bissang (FRA), Apostolos Kalpakas (GRE), Sergio Silva (ESP)

=== Game 5 ===
12 November 2013
20:00 CET

Boxscore

BCM Gravelines (France)	85–67	(Spain) CAI Zaragoza
Scoring by quarter: 28–20, 13–24, 14–18, 30–5
Pts: Rousselle 21; Rebs: Camara 6 Asts: Rousselle 5		Pts: Tomàs 16; Rebs: Sanikidze 8 Asts: Stefánsson, Tabu 4

Sportica, Gravelines
Attendance: 2,500
Referees: Sasa Pukl (SLO), Renaud Geller (BEL), Markos Michaelides (SUI)

12 November 2013
20:30 CET

Boxscore

Belfius Mons-Hainaut (Belgium)	57–77	(Germany) Alba Berlin
Scoring by quarter: 16–14, 11–18, 16–18, 14–27
Pts: Battle 14; Rebs: Love 8 Asts: Muya Muboyayi 4		Pts: Logan 20; Rebs: King 6 Asts: Hammonds 5

Mons Arena, Mons
Attendance: 850
Referees: Fernando Rocha (POR), Petar Obradovic (BIH), Milos Koljensic (MNE)

12 November 2013
20:45 CET

Boxscore

Acea Roma (Italy)	75–85	(Germany) Telekom Baskets Bonn
Scoring by quarter: 18–13, 15–35, 17–20, 25–17
Pts: Jones 19; Rebs: Hosley 5 Asts: Taylor, Hosley 4		Pts: Veikalas 23; Rebs: McLean 7 Asts: Jordan 5

Palatiziano, Rome
Attendance: 1,709
Referees: Jakub Zamojski (POL), Tomislav Vovk (CRO), Semen Ovinov (RUS)

=== Game 6 ===
19 November 2013
20:30 CET

Boxscore

Belfius Mons-Hainaut (Belgium)	65–104	(Spain) CAI Zaragoza
Scoring by quarter: 18–20, 15–28, 15–24, 17–32
Pts: Battle 16; Rebs: Love, Randle 6 Asts: Muya Muboyayi 5		Pts: Roll, Tabu 14; Rebs: Jones 11; Asts: Roll 5

Mons Arena, Mons
Attendance: 730
Referees: Tolga Sahin (ITA), Sergiy Chebyshev (UKR), Aleksandar Glisic (SRB)

20 November 2013
20:00 CET

Boxscore

BCM Gravelines (France)	74–64	(Italy) Acea Roma
Scoring by quarter: 15-17, 20-14, 15-16, 24-17
Pts: Camara 20; Rebs: Akpomedah 9 Asts: Diabate 6		Pts: Hosley 16; Rebs: Mbakwe 9 Asts: Taylor 3

Gravelines Sportica, Gravelines
Attendance: 2,500
Referees: Miguel Perez Perez (ESP), Igor Dragojevic (MNE), Oskars Lucis (LAT)

20 November 2013
20:00 CET

Boxscore

Alba Berlin (Germany)	76–61	(Germany) Telekom Baskets Bonn
Scoring by quarter: 13–18, 24–15, 19–19, 20–9
Pts: Logan 16; Rebs: Kendall 10; Asts: Redding 5		Pts: McLean 15; Rebs: McLean 6 Asts: Mangold, Jordan 3

O2 World, Berlin
Attendance: 8,110
Referees: Sasa Pukl (SLO), Seffi Shemmesh (ISR), Renaud Geller (BEL)

=== Game 7 ===
27 November 2013
19:30 CET

Boxscore

Telekom Baskets Bonn (Germany)	80–77	(France) BCM Gravelines
Scoring by quarter: 15–15, 22–20, 17–21, 26–21
Pts: Jordan 16; Rebs: McLean 12; Asts: Jordan 5		Pts: Lewis 26; Rebs: Lewis 11; Asts: Lewis 6

Telekom Dome, Bonn
Attendance: 4,500
Referees: Juan Carlos Garcia Gonzalez (ESP), Alexey Davydov (RUS), Tomislav Hordov (CRO)

27 November 2013
20:30 CET

Boxscore

CAI Zaragoza (Spain)	75–50	(Germany) Alba Berlin
Scoring by quarter: 19–9, 20–13, 19–11, 17–17
Pts: Rudež 14; Rebs: Tabu 6 Asts: Llompart 5		Pts: Redding 10; Rebs: Three players 5 Asts: Redding 4

Pabellón Príncipe Felipe, Zaragoza
Attendance: 6,787
Referees: Spiros Gkontas (GRE), Matej Boltauzer (SLO), Oskars Lucis (LAT)

27 November 2013
20:45 CET

Boxscore

Acea Roma (Italy)	60–61	(Belgium) Belfius Mons-Hainaut
Scoring by quarter: 18–12, 20–20, 13–14, 9–15
Pts: Jones, Baron 10; Rebs: Jones, Eziukwu 6 Asts: Taylor 4		Pts: Battle 13; Rebs: Randle 16; Asts: Battle 3

Palatiziano, Rome
Attendance: 1,494
Referees: Jose Martin (ESP), Ioannis Foufis (GRE), Mario Majkic (SLO)

=== Game 8 ===
3 December 2013
20:30 CET

Boxscore

Belfius Mons-Hainaut (Belgium)	53–85	(France) BCM Gravelines
Scoring by quarter: 12–20, 16–27, 9–21, 16–17
Pts: Love 16; Rebs: Love 7 Asts: four players 2		Pts: three players 14; Rebs: Lewis 7 Asts: Bokolo, Rousselle 6

Mons Arena, Mons
Attendance: 1,580
Referees: Matej Boltauzer (SLO), Aare Halliko (EST), Clements Fritz (GER)

4 December 2013
20:30 CET

Boxscore

CAI Zaragoza (Spain)	71–60	(Germany) Telekom Baskets Bonn
Scoring by quarter: 10–20, 17–12, 20–11, 24–17
Pts: Shermadini 14; Rebs: Sanikidze 12; Asts: Llompart 7		Pts: Brooks 18; Rebs: Jordan, McLean 6 Asts: Jordan 6

Pabellón Príncipe Felipe, Zaragoza
Attendance: 7,136
Referees: Robert Vyklicky (CZE), Tomasz Trawicki (POL), Milos Koljensic (MNE)

5 December 2013
20:00 CET

Boxscore

Alba Berlin (Germany)	84–81	(Italy) Acea Roma
Scoring by quarter: 15-17, 22-21, 17-24, 30-21
Pts: Redding 20; Rebs: Wohlfarth, Jagla 5 Asts: Redding 3		Pts: Baron 25; Rebs: Mbakwe 9 Asts: Hosley 7

O2 World, Berlin
Attendance: 6,851
Referees: Vicente Bulto (ESP), Milija Vojinovic (SRB), Nick Van Den Broeck (BEL)

=== Game 9 ===
10 December 2013
20:00 CET

Boxscore

BCM Gravelines (France)	72–85	(Germany) Alba Berlin
Scoring by quarter: 16-23, 25-18, 14-20, 17-24
Pts: Rousselle 16; Rebs: Camara 9 Asts: Bokolo 4		Pts: Stojanovski 23; Rebs: Kendall 8 Asts: Redding 6

Gravelines Sportica, Gravelines
Attendance: 2,400
Referees: Miguel Angel Perez Niz (ESP), Apostolos Kalpakas (SWE), Gintaras Vitkauskas (LTU)

11 December 2013
20:30 CET

Boxscore

Belfius Mons-Hainaut (Belgium)	91–90 (OT)	(Germany) Telekom Baskets Bonn
Scoring by quarter: 21–19, 19–19, 21–18, 17–22, Overtime: 13–12
Pts: Love 20; Rebs: Love 14; Asts: Three players 3		Pts: Veikalas, Gaffney 18; Rebs: Gaffney 9 Asts: Veikalas, Jordan 5

MonsArena, Mons
Attendance: 630
Referees: Marek Cmikiewicz (POL), Carlos Cortes (ESP), Arnis Ozols (LAT)

11 December 2013
20:45 CET

Boxscore

Acea Roma (Italy)	83–81	(Spain) CAI Zaragoza
Scoring by quarter: 18–18, 19–25, 19–18, 27–20
Pts: Baron 21; Rebs: Mbakwe 13; Asts: Goss 5		Pts: Rudež, Shermadini 14; Rebs: Sanikidze 8 Asts: Rudež 4

Palazzetto dello Sport, Rome
Attendance: 1,431
Referees: Anastasios Piloidis (GRE), Sergio Silva (POR), Josip Radojkovic (CRO)

=== Game 10 ===
18 December 2013
19:30 CET

Boxscore

Telekom Baskets Bonn (Germany)	96–88 (OT)	(Italy) Acea Roma
Scoring by quarter: 21–14, 27–23, 20–29, 15–17, Overtime: 13–5
Pts: McLean, Veikalas 21; Rebs: Looby 10; Asts: Jordan 7		Pts: Hosley 24; Rebs: Mbakwe, Jones 6 Asts: Hosley 5

Telekom Dome, Bonn
Attendance: 4,400
Referees: Tomas Jasevicius (LTU), Jasmina Juras (SRB), Omer Esteron (ISR)

18 December 2013
20:00 CET

Boxscore

Alba Berlin (Germany)	81–46	(Belgium) Belfius Mons-Hainaut
Scoring by quarter: 22–10, 17–14, 22–12, 20–10
Pts: Radošević 14; Rebs: Jagla 6 Asts: Redding 4		Pts: Muya Muboyayi 9 Rebs: Love 10; Asts: Muya Muboyayi 3

O2 World, Berlin
Attendance: 7,573
Referees: Dani Hierrenzuelo (ESP), Carmelo Paternico (ITA), Igor Dragojevic (MNE)

18 December 2013
20:30 CET

Boxscore

CAI Zaragoza (Spain)	86–73	(France) BCM Gravelines
Scoring by quarter: 34–15, 13–23, 21–29, 18–6
Pts: Roll 16; Rebs: Fontet 7 Asts: Llompart, Tabu 4		Pts: Gray 17; Rebs: Holland 7 Asts: Bokolo 4

Pabellón Príncipe Felipe, Zaragoza
Attendance: 5,731
Referees: Emin Mogulkoc (TUR), Petar Obradovic (BIH), Uros Obrknezevic (SRB)
