= 2015 BBL Playoffs =

German basketball postseason

Tournament details
- Country: Germany
- Dates: 9 May April – 21 June 2015
- Season: 2014–15
- Teams: 8
- Defending champions: Bayern Munich

Final positions
- Champions: Brose Baskets (7th title)
- Runners-up: Bayern Munich
- Semifinalists: Alba Berlin; ratiopharm Ulm

Tournament statistics
- Matches played: 27

The 2015 BBL Playoffs was the concluding postseason of the 2014–15 Basketball Bundesliga season. The Playoffs started on 9 May and ended on 21 June 2015.

== Playoff qualifying ==
Pos	Team	Pld	W	L	PF	PA	PD	Pts	Seeding
1	Brose Baskets	34	29	5	2872	2389	+483	58	Seeded teams
2	Alba Berlin	34	28	6	2875	2496	+379	56	Seeded teams
3	Bayern Munich	34	26	8	3043	2555	+488	52	Seeded teams
4	Telekom Baskets Bonn	34	23	11	2856	2738	+118	46	Seeded teams
5	ratiopharm Ulm	34	21	13	2839	2846	−7	42	Unseeded teams
6	Skyliners Frankfurt	34	20	14	2635	2565	+70	40	Unseeded teams
7	EWE Baskets Oldenburg	34	19	15	2748	2681	+67	38	Unseeded teams
8	MHP Riesen Ludwigsburg	34	17	17	2727	2676	+51	34	Unseeded teams

Source: Beko BBL

== Bracket ==
Quarterfinals
1	Brose Baskets	3
8	MHP Ludwigsburg	0
4	Telekom Baskets Bonn	2
5	ratiopharm Ulm	3
3	Bayern Munich	3
6	Skyliners Frankfurt	1
2	Alba Berlin	3
7	EWE Baskets Oldenburg	0

Semifinals
1	Brose Baskets	3
5	ratiopharm Ulm	0
3	Bayern Munich	3
2	Alba Berlin	2

Final
1	Brose Baskets	3
3	Bayern Munich	2

== Quarterfinals ==
The quarterfinals were played in a best of five format from 6 to 20 May 2015.

=== Brose Baskets vs MHP Riesen Ludwigsburg ===
9 May
14:45

Boxscore

Brose Baskets 87, MHP Riesen Ludwigsburg 79
Scoring by quarter: 27–26, 19–18, 22–10, 19–25
Pts: Dawan Robinson 18; Rebs: Mbakwe, Theis 7 Asts: Brad Wanamaker 5	Pts: D. J. Kennedy 18; Rebs: Jon Brockman 14; Asts: Johnson, Stockton 4

Brose Arena, Bamberg
Attendance: 6,800
Referees: Markus Hesse, Andreas Schreiner, Steffen Neubecker

12 May
20:00

Boxscore

MHP Riesen Ludwigsburg 84, Brose Baskets 89 (OT)
Scoring by quarter: 19–16, 14–22, 20–18, 21–18, Overtime: 10–15
Pts: John Little 21; Rebs: Jon Brockman 12; Asts: Michael Stockton 3	Pts: Daniel Theis 17; Rebs: Jānis Strēlnieks 9 Asts: Brad Wanamaker 4

Arena Ludwigsburg, Ludwigsburg
Attendance: 4,500
Referees: Moritz Reiter, Fritz Clemens, Julian Groll

14 May
20:00

Boxscore

Brose Baskets 87, MHP Riesen Ludwigsburg 79
Scoring by quarter: 18–22, 17–20, 27–16, 25–21
Pts: Brad Wanamaker 21; Rebs: Trevor Mbakwe 11; Asts: Robinson, Wanamaker 4	Pts: D. J. Kennedy 22; Rebs: Brockman, Kennedy 7 Asts: Shawn Huff 4
Bamberg wins series 3–0

Brose Arena, Bamberg
Attendance: 6,800
Referees: Boris Schmidt, Toni Rodríguez, Nesa Kovačević

=== Alba Berlin vs EWE Baskets Oldenburg ===
10 May
20:15

Boxscore

Alba Berlin 95, EWE Baskets Oldenburg 90
Scoring by quarter: 22–26, 24–25, 19–21, 30–18
Pts: Alex Renfroe 23; Rebs: three players 4 Asts: Alex Renfroe 10	Pts: Rickey Paulding 21; Rebs: Robin Smeulders 7 Asts: Chris Kramer 6

O_{2} World, Berlin
Attendance: 9,165
Referees: Boris Schmidt, Martin Matip, Steve Bittner

13 May
20:30

Boxscore

EWE Baskets Oldenburg 78, Alba Berlin 88
Scoring by quarter: 23–16, 17–23, 20–22, 18–27
Pts: Adam Chubb 22; Rebs: Smeulders, Kramer 4 Asts: Casper Ware 5	Pts: Marko Banić 19; Rebs: Jamel McLean 7 Asts: Alex Renfroe 11

Große EWE Arena, Oldenburg
Attendance: 6,000
Referees: Robert Lottermoser, Oliver Krause, Anne Panther

15 May
19:30

Boxscore

Alba Berlin 87, EWE Baskets Oldenburg 77
Scoring by quarter: 21–20, 21–20, 18–12, 27–25
Pts: Cliff Hammonds 16; Rebs: Alex Renfroe 6 Asts: Redding, Renfroe 7	Pts: Casper Ware 20; Rebs: Chris Kramer 10; Asts: Chris Kramer 8
Berlin wins series 3–0

O_{2} World, Berlin
Attendance: 12,155
Referees: Moritz Reiter, Clemens Fritz, Christof Madinger

=== Bayern Munich vs Skyliners Frankfurt ===
9 May
20:30

Boxscore

Bayern Munich 83, Skyliners Frankfurt 82
Scoring by quarter: 18–19, 21–18, 15–16, 29–19
Pts: Nihad Đedović 17; Rebs: Nihad Đedović 8 Asts: Vasilije Micić 4	Pts: Danilo Barthel 12; Rebs: Aaron Doornekamp 6 Asts: Justin Cobbs 7

Audi Dome, Munich
Attendance: 6,021
Referees: Toni Rodríguez, Konstantin Simonow, Carsten Straube

12 May
18:30

Boxscore

Skyliners Frankfurt 93, Bayern Munich 69
Scoring by quarter: 17–14, 20–18, 27–19, 29–18
Pts: Armand, Cobbs 18; Rebs: Aaron Doornekamp 6 Asts: Justin Cobbs 6	Pts: John Bryant 16; Rebs: Bryce Taylor 7 Asts: Anton Gavel 4

Fraport Arena, Frankfurt
Attendance: 4,710
Referees: Martin Matip, Andreas Schreiner, Jonas Reiter

14 May
17:00

Boxscore

Bayern Munich 82, Skyliners Frankfurt 64
Scoring by quarter: 25–18, 21–10, 17–20, 19–16
Pts: Bryce Taylor 23; Rebs: Vladimir Štimac 7 Asts: four players 3	Pts: Danilo Barthel 17; Rebs: Jacob Burtschi 6 Asts: Quantez Robertson 4

Audi Dome, Munich
Attendance: 6,700
Referees: Markus Hesse, Steffen Neubecker, Steve Bittner

17 May
17:00

Boxscore

Skyliners Frankfurt 71, Bayern Munich 92
Scoring by quarter: 16–15, 16–23, 18–22, 21–32
Pts: Justin Cobbs 20; Rebs: Armand, Robertson 5 Asts: Quantez Robertson 4	Pts: Vladimir Štimac 20; Rebs: Vladimir Štimac 10; Asts: three players 4
Munich wins series 3–1

Fraport Arena, Frankfurt
Attendance: 4,720
Referees: Oliver Krause, Toni Rodríguez, Konstantin Simonow

=== Telekom Baskets Bonn vs ratiopharm Ulm ===
6 May
18:30

Boxscore

Telekom Baskets Bonn 73, ratiopharm Ulm 75
Scoring by quarter: 24–20, 15–16, 24–17, 10–22
Pts: Ryan Brooks 14; Rebs: Benas Veikalas 8 Asts: Eugene Lawrence 8	Pts: Tim Ohlbrecht 16; Rebs: Will Clyburn 9 Asts: Brion Rush 5

Telekom Dome, Bonn
Attendance: 5,020
Referees: Robert Lottermoser, Christof Madinger, Anne Panther

9 May
18:30

Boxscore

ratiopharm Ulm 88, Telekom Baskets Bonn 93
Scoring by quarter: 29–23, 19–29, 16–17, 24–24
Pts: Jaka Klobučar 15; Rebs: Maarty Leunen 9 Asts: Jaka Klobučar 5	Pts: Brooks, Klimavičius 16; Rebs: three players 5 Asts: Eugene Lawrence 6

Arena Ulm/Neu-Ulm, Ulm
Attendance: 6,200
Referees: Moritz Reiter, Benjamin Barth, Nesa Kovačević

15 May
18:30

Boxscore

Telekom Baskets Bonn 99, ratiopharm Ulm 95
Scoring by quarter: 19–23, 28–21, 27–23, 25–28
Pts: Angelo Caloiaro 17; Rebs: three players 5 Asts: Brooks, Lawrence 5	Pts: Ian Vougioukas 27; Rebs: Tim Ohlbrecht 5 Asts: Günther, Klobučar 5

Telekom Dome, Bonn
Attendance: 6,000
Referees: Martin Matip, Konstantin Simonow, Carsten Straube

17 May
17:00

Boxscore

ratiopharm Ulm 86, Telekom Baskets Bonn 73
Scoring by quarter: 22–16, 18–14, 22–16, 24–27
Pts: Clyburn, Vougioukas 22; Rebs: Ian Vougioukas 10; Asts: Per Günther 5	Pts: Mickey McConnell 16; Rebs: Eugene Lawrence 6 Asts: Eugene Lawrence 8

Arena Ulm/Neu-Ulm, Ulm
Attendance: 6,200
Referees: Martin Matip, Benjamin Barth, Christof Madinger

20 May
20:00

Boxscore

Telekom Baskets Bonn 79, ratiopharm Ulm 86
Scoring by quarter: 17–19, 21–21, 21–17, 20–29
Pts: Tadas Klimavičius 18; Rebs: Ryan Brooks 7 Asts: Eugene Lawrence 7	Pts: Ian Vougioukas 18; Rebs: Ian Vougioukas 7 Asts: Per Günther 6
Ulm wins series 3–2

Telekom Dome, Bonn
Attendance: 6,000
Referees: Robert Lottermoser, Moritz Reiter, Nesa Kovačević

== Semifinals ==
The semifinals were played in a best of five format from 23 May to 4 June 2015.

=== Brose Baskets vs ratiopharm Ulm ===
23 May
20:30

Boxscore

Brose Baskets 99, ratiopharm Ulm 63
Scoring by quarter: 28–14, 15–15, 24–18, 32–16
Pts: Brad Wanamaker 20; Rebs: Daniel Theis 7 Asts: Karsten Tadda 7	Pts: Deonte Burton 13; Rebs: Clyburn, Vougioukas 3 Asts: Per Günther 4

Brose Arena, Bamberg
Attendance: 6,800
Referees: Boris Schmidt, Moritz Reiter, Benjamin Barth

27 May
20:30

Boxscore

ratiopharm Ulm 80, Brose Baskets 81
Scoring by quarter: 19–18, 26–17, 21–21, 14–25
Pts: Ian Vougioukas 19; Rebs: Tim Ohlbrecht 6 Asts: three players 3	Pts: Brad Wanamaker 19; Rebs: Trevor Mbakwe 13; Asts: Brad Wanamaker 5

Arena Ulm/Neu-Ulm, Ulm
Attendance: 6,200
Referees: Robert Lottermoser, Oliver Krause, Konstantin Simonow

30 May
17:00

Boxscore

Brose Baskets 90, ratiopharm Ulm 70
Scoring by quarter: 17–14, 25–16, 22–26, 26–14
Pts: Jānis Strēlnieks 28; Rebs: Trevor Mbakwe 12; Asts: Ryan Thompson 6	Pts: Per Günther 15; Rebs: Jaka Klobučar 5 Asts: Per Günther 6
Bamberg wins series 3–0

Brose Arena, Bamberg
Attendance: 6,800
Referees: Martin Matip, Toni Rodriguez, Carsten Straube

=== Alba Berlin vs Bayern Munich ===
24 May
17:00

Boxscore

Alba Berlin 81, Bayern Munich 55
Scoring by quarter: 18–9, 21–17, 22–13, 20–16
Pts: McLean, Redding 14; Rebs: Reggie Redding 6 Asts: Alex Renfroe 6	Pts: Nihad Đedović 13; Rebs: Bryant, Štimac 5 Asts: Vasilije Micić 4

O_{2} World, Berlin
Attendance: 10,345
Referees: Robert Lottermoser, Martin Matip, Nesa Kovačević

28 May
19:30

Boxscore

Bayern Munich 85, Alba Berlin 73
Scoring by quarter: 25–19, 21–18, 15–17, 24–19
Pts: Bryce Taylor 14; Rebs: Vladimir Štimac 9 Asts: Anton Gavel 4	Pts: Jamel McLean 16; Rebs: Alex Renfroe 9 Asts: Vasilije Micić 6

Audi Dome, Munich
Attendance: 6,700
Referees: Boris Schmidt, Markus Hesse, Toni Rodriguez

31 May
16:00

Boxscore

Alba Berlin 101, Bayern Munich 88
Scoring by quarter: 26–21, 24–23, 24–30, 17–14
Pts: Reggie Redding 20; Rebs: Reggie Redding 7 Asts: three players 6	Pts: Nihad Đedović 17; Rebs: John Bryant 8 Asts: Gavel, Savanović 3

O_{2} World, Berlin
Attendance: 13,133
Referees: Robert Lottermoser, Moritz Reiter, Clemens Fritz

2 June
20:00

Boxscore

Bayern Munich 89, Alba Berlin 83
Scoring by quarter: 19–20, 26–23, 21–22, 23–18
Pts: John Bryant 19; Rebs: Vladimir Štimac 8 Asts: Gavel, Schaffartzik 4	Pts: Reggie Redding 17; Rebs: Leon Radošević 6 Asts: Alex Renfroe 6

Audi Dome, Munich
Attendance: 6,700
Referees: Boris Schmidt, Toni Rodríguez, Nesa Kovačević

4 June
20:00

Boxscore

Alba Berlin 96, Bayern Munich 101 (OT)
Scoring by quarter: 22–18, 22–23, 19–25, 25–22, Overtime: 8–13
Pts: Jamel McLean 29; Rebs: Jamel McLean 10; Asts: Jamel McLean 6	Pts: Nihad Đedović 30; Rebs: John Bryant 8 Asts: Nihad Đedović 5
Munich wins series 3–2

O_{2} World, Berlin
Attendance: 11,443
Referees: Robert Lottermoser, Moritz Reiter, Martin Matip

== Finals ==
The Finals were played in a best of five format from 7 to 21 June 2015.

7 June
15:00

Boxscore

Brose Baskets 73, Bayern Munich 84
Scoring by quarter: 28–27, 10–17, 16–17, 19–23
Pts: Brad Wanamaker 15; Rebs: Brad Wanamaker 7 Asts: Brad Wanamaker 5	Pts: Vladimir Štimac 16; Rebs: Bryce Taylor 7 Asts: three players 4

Brose Arena, Bamberg
Attendance: 6,800
Referees: Boris Schmidt, Moritz Reiter, Nesa Kovačević

10 June
20:00

Boxscore

Bayern Munich 78, Brose Baskets 80
Scoring by quarter: 20–13, 29–22, 16–23, 13–22
Pts: John Bryant 16; Rebs: Duško Savanović 8 Asts: Nihad Đedović 7	Pts: Brad Wanamaker 19; Rebs: Brad Wanamaker 10; Asts: Brad Wanamaker 4

Audi Dome, Munich
Attendance: 6,700
Referees: Robert Lottermoser, Martin Matip, Toni Rodríguez

14 June
19:00

Boxscore

Brose Baskets 91, Bayern Munich 79
Scoring by quarter: 21–18, 23–26, 26–14, 21–21
Pts: Jānis Strēlnieks 16; Rebs: Trevor Mbakwe 9 Asts: Brad Wanamaker 6	Pts: John Bryant 20; Rebs: Paul Zipser 6 Asts: Duško Savanović 6

Brose Arena, Bamberg
Attendance: 6,800
Referees: Martin Matip, Boris Schmidt, Nesa Kovačević

17 June
20:00

Boxscore

Bayern Munich 83, Brose Baskets 73
Scoring by quarter: 20–19, 25–15, 20–17, 18–22
Pts: Bryce Taylor 22; Rebs: John Bryant 15; Asts: Vasilije Micić 8	Pts: Jānis Strēlnieks 22; Rebs: Trevor Mbakwe 9 Asts: Brad Wanamaker 7

Audi Dome, Munich
Attendance: 6,700
Referees: Robert Lottermoser, Moritz Reiter, Toni Rodríguez

21 June
15:00

Boxscore

Brose Baskets 88, Bayern Munich 84
Scoring by quarter: 26–19, 23–17, 14–14, 25–34
Pts: Trevor Mbakwe 20; Rebs: Trevor Mbakwe 13; Asts: Brad Wanamaker 8	Pts: John Bryant 16; Rebs: John Bryant 6 Asts: Nihad Đedović 5
Bamberg wins series 3–2

Brose Arena, Bamberg
Attendance: 6,800
Referees: Robert Lottermoser, Moritz Reiter, Martin Matip
