= 2017–18 Telekom Baskets Bonn season =

Telekom Baskets Bonn
2017–18 season
- Chairman: Wolfgang Wiedlich
- Head coach: Predrag Krunić
- Arena: Telekom Dome
- Bundesliga: 5th seed
- Playoffs: Quarterfinalist (eliminated by Brose Bamberg)
- Champions League: Regular season
Uniform
Uniform

The 2017–18 Telekom Baskets Bonn season was the 26th season of the German basketball club. The team will play in the Basketball Bundesliga and in the Basketball Champions League this season. Bonn reached the quarter-finals of the BBL Playoffs where it was eliminated 0–3 by Brose Bamberg.

== Club ==
=== Technical staff ===
| Position | Staff |
|---|---|
| Head coach | Predrag Krunić |
| Assistant coaches | Chris O'Shea |
| Doctor | Bogdan Suciu; Daniel Seffern |
| Physiotherapists | Mark Schröder; Bogdan Suciu |

Source: Telekom Baskets Bonn

=== Kit ===
Supplier: Spalding / Sponsor: Telekom

| Home | Away |

== Roster ==
2017–18 2017–18 Telekom Baskets Bonn roster
Players
Coaches

| Pos. | No. | Nat. | Name | Ht. | Wt. | Age | From |
|---|---|---|---|---|---|---|---|
| F/C | 12 | (Germany) | Breunig, Martin | 2.03 m (6 ft 8 in) | 92 kg (203 lb) | 33 – 18 February 1992 | MHP Riesen Ludwigsburg |
| G | 11 | (Germany) | DiLeo, T. J. | 1.90 m (6 ft 3 in) | 92 kg (203 lb) | 34 – 22 June 1990 | Giessen 46ers |
| G | 4 | (United States) | Curry, Ron | 1.93 m (6 ft 4 in) | 86 kg (190 lb) | 31 – 12 July 1993 | Krka |
| C | 9 | (United States) | Gamble, Julian | 2.08 m (6 ft 10 in) | 114 kg (251 lb) | 35 – 15 May 1989 | Basic-Fit Brussels |
| G | 16 | (Germany) | Frankl-Maus, Viktor (ProB) | 1.86 m (6 ft 1 in) | 82 kg (181 lb) | 31 – 8 September 1993 | Dragons Rhöndorf |
| PF | 10 | (Germany) | Jasinski, Julian | 2.01 m (6 ft 7 in) | 95 kg (209 lb) | 28 – 27 April 1996 | EN Baskets Schwelm |
| G | 7 | (Germany) | Klein, Konstantin | 1.87 m (6 ft 2 in) | 86 kg (190 lb) | 33 – 21 May 1991 | Skyliners Frankfurt |
| PF | 19 | (Germany) | Kneesch, Yannick (ProB) | 2.04 m (6 ft 8 in) | 105 kg (231 lb) | 33 – 21 May 1991 | Dragons Rhöndorf |
| C | 17 | (Germany) | Möller, Alexander (ProB) | 2.07 m (6 ft 9 in) | 104 kg (229 lb) | 27 – 22 January 1998 | Dragons Rhöndorf |
| G | 14 | (United States) | Mayo, Josh | 1.81 m (5 ft 11 in) | 76 kg (168 lb) | 37 – 15 July 1987 | Scafati Basket |
| PF | 5 | (United States) | Parks, Jordan | 2.01 m (6 ft 7 in) | 92 kg (203 lb) | 30 – 6 April 1994 | Alma Trieste |
| F | 13 | (Cuba) | Polas Bartolo, Yorman | 1.93 m (6 ft 4 in) | 89 kg (196 lb) | 39 – 8 August 1985 | Giessen 46ers |
| PF | 8 | (Montenegro) | Đurišić, Nemanja | 2.03 m (6 ft 8 in) | 104 kg (229 lb) | 33 – 23 February 1992 | Stelmet Zielona Góra |
| PF | 6 | (Croatia) | Zubčić, Tomislav | 2.12 m (6 ft 11 in) | 105 kg (231 lb) | 35 – 17 January 1990 | Trabzonspor B.K. |

Head coach

- (Bosnia and Herzegovina) Predrag Krunić

Assistant coach(es)

- (United States) Chris O'Shea

Legend

- (C) Team captain
- (ProB) On assignment to ProB
  side Dragons Rhöndorf.
- Injured

- Roster
Updated: 2017-22-11

== Transactions ==
=== Players in ===
| Player | From | Ref. |
|---|---|---|
| (Croatia) Tomislav Zubčić | (Turkey) Trabzonspor | |
| (United States) Ron Curry | (Slovenia) Krka | |
| (Montenegro) Nemanja Đurišić | (Poland) Stelmet Zielona Góra | |
| (United States) Jordan Parks | (Italy) Trieste | |
| (Germany) Julian Jasinski | (Germany) Schwelm | |
| (Germany) Martin Breunig | (Germany) MHP Riesen Ludwigsburg | |

Total spending: ▼€0

=== Players out ===
| Player | From | Ref. |
|---|---|---|
| (Germany) Johannes Richter | (Germany) Oettinger Rockets | |
| (United States) Ryan Thompson | (Germany) ratiopharm Ulm | |
| (Germany) Florian Koch | (Germany) MHP Riesen Ludwigsburg | |
| (United States) Ken Horton | (France) Élan Béarnais | |
| (Latvia) Ojārs Siliņš | (Italy) Dolomiti Energia Trento | |

Total spending: ▲€0
