= Julian Jasinski =

German-Polish basketball player

Sokół Łańcut
- Position: Power forward / small forward
- League: PLK

Personal information
- Born: 27 April 1996 (age 30) Bochum
- Listed height: 6 ft 7 in (2.01 m)

Career information
- Playing career: 2014–present

Career history
- 2017–2019: Baskets Bonn
- 2019–2020: Stelmet Zielona Góra
- 2020–2022: KKK MOSiR Krosno
- 2022–present: Sokół Łańcut

Julian Jasinski (born 27 April 1996) is a German-Polish professional basketball player for Sokół Łańcut of the PLK.
