= Andrej Mangold =

German basketball player (born 1987)

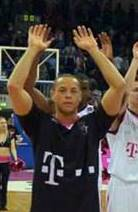
- Mangold with Telekom Baskets Bonn

No. 0 – TSV Oberhaching Tropics
- Position: Point guard

Personal information
- Born: 14 January 1987 (age 39) Hannover, Germany
- Listed height: 6 ft 3 in (1.91 m)
- Listed weight: 205 lb (93 kg)

Career information
- Playing career: 2004–present

Career history
- 2004–2005: TK Hannover
- 2005–2007: Oldenburger TB
- 2007–2009: München Basket
- 2009–2010: UBC Hannover
- 2010–2011: Artland Dragons
- 2011–2016: Telekom Baskets Bonn
- 2017–2018: s.Oliver Würzburg
- 2018–2019: Fraport Skyliners
- 2019–2024: RheinStars Köln
- 2026–present: TSV Oberhaching Tropics

Andrej Mangold (born 14 January 1987) is a German professional basketball player who last played for TSV Oberhaching Tropics of the German ProB.

== Personal life ==
Mangold was born Hanover Germany and is of African-American and Latvian descent.
