= Hardtberghalle =

Indoor sporting arena in Bonn, Germany

Coordinates: 50°42′10″N 7°03′09″E

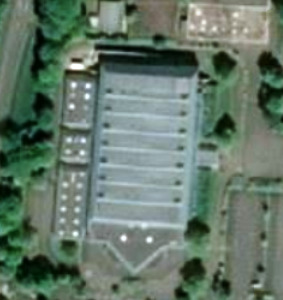
- Interactive map of Hardtberghalle

Hardtberghalle is an indoor sporting arena that is located in Bonn, Germany. The capacity of the arena is 3,500 people. It was home to the Telekom Baskets Bonn basketball team until the Telekom Dome opened in 2008.
