= Carsten Pohl =

German professional basketball coach (born 1965)

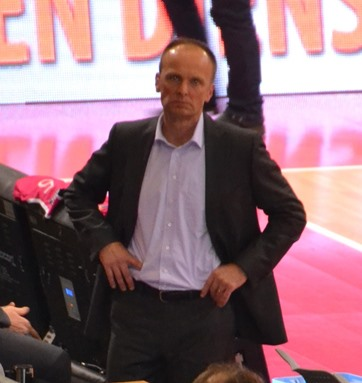

Telekom Baskets Bonn

Personal information
- Born: 23 March 1965 (age 61) Bonn, Germany

Career history

Coaching
- 1998–1999: Telekom Baskets Bonn (assistant)
- 1999–2002: SG Sechtem
- 2012–2015: Telekom Baskets Bonn (assistant)
- 2015–2016: Telekom Baskets Bonn (head coach)

Carsten Pohl (born 23 March 1965) is a German professional basketball coach. He served as head coach and assistant coach for the Telekom Baskets Bonn of the German Basketball League between 2012 and 2016.

Since 2015, he leads the club's young talents development program.

In December 2015, he got promoted to head coach of the Baskets Bonn. In 2016, he handed the position over to Silvano Poropat to return to his duties as youth coordinator.
