= Robert Maras =

German basketball player (born 1978)

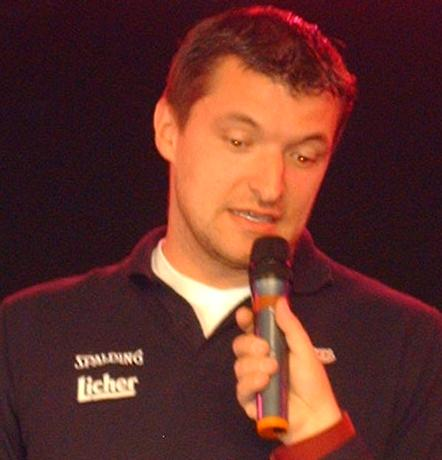

Personal information
- Born: 20 October 1978 Freiburg, West Germany
- Listed height: 2.15 m (7 ft 1 in)

Career information
- Playing career: 1996–2011
- Position: Center
- Coaching career: 2011–present

Career history

Playing
- 1996–1998: USC Freiburg
- 1998–2000: Alba Berlin
- 2000–2004: Skyliners Frankfurt
- 2004–2005: Caja San Fernando
- 2005–2006: UB La Palma
- 2006–2007: Giessen 46ers
- 2007: Aigaleo
- 2008: UB La Palma
- 2008–2009: Giessen 46ers
- 2009–2011: Bayern Munich

Coaching
- 2011–2013: Muenchen Nord
- 2014–2016: TSV Oberhaching Tropics

Robert Maras (born 20 October 1978 in Freiburg) is a German former professional basketball player and basketball coach. Maras was born to immigrants from Croatia.

== Professional career ==
Maras played professional basketball in Spain (Caja San Fernando Sevilla, Palma Aqua Magica, U.B. La Palma), Greece (Egaleo AO) and Germany (USC Freiburg, ALBA Berlin, TuS Lichterfelde, Frankfurt Opel Skyliners, Giessen 46ers, Bayern Munich and TSV Oberhaching Tropics).

== National team career ==
Maras was a member of two of the most successful squads in German national team history. He was a part of the German teams that won the bronze medal at the 2002 FIBA World Championship, and the silver medal at the 2005 EuroBasket. Overall, he was a member of the German national basketball team on 66 occasions.
