= Dawan Robinson =

American basketball player

Personal information
- Born: February 10, 1982 (age 44) Philadelphia, Pennsylvania
- Listed height: 6 ft 2 in (1.88 m)
- Listed weight: 195 lb (88 kg)

Career information
- High school: Maine Central Institute (Pittsfield, Maine)
- College: Rhode Island (2002–2006)
- NBA draft: 2006: undrafted
- Playing career: 2006–2017
- Position: Point guard

Career history
- 2006–2007: Limoges CSP
- 2007–2008: Śląsk Wrocław
- 2008–2010: Prima Veroli
- 2010–2011: Erie BayHawks
- 2011–2012: Reggiana
- 2012–2013: Skyliners Frankfurt
- 2013–2014: Barak Netanya
- 2014–2015: Varese
- 2015: Brose Bamberg
- 2015: Auxilium Torino
- 2016: Olimpija Ljubljana
- 2016–2017: Verona

Career highlights
- Bundesliga champion (2015); First-team All-Atlantic 10 (2006)

Dawan Robinson (born February 10, 1982) is an American former professional basketball player. He played college basketball at the University of Rhode Island.

== Career ==
After going undrafted at the 2006 NBA draft and playing in the preseason with the Los Angeles Clippers, Robinson spent his first professional season in France with CSP Limoges. For the 2007–08 season he signed with the Polish club Śląsk Wrocław.

In the summer of 2008, he signed with Prima Veroli of the Italian LegADue. On June 22, 2009, he re-signed with Veroli for one more season. On February 16, 2010, he left Veroli and signed with Reyer Venezia Mestre. However seven days later, he parted ways with Venezia due to injury.

In November 2010, he joined the Erie BayHawks of the NBA D-League. On January 11, 2011, he left the Bayhawks and signed with the Italian club Trenkwalder Reggio Emilia for the rest of the season. On June 19, 2011, he re-signed with Reggio Emilia for one more season. On July 29, 2012, he again re-signed with Reggio Emilia. However, on September 1, 2012, he parted ways with Reggio Emilia because he did not recover from the forearm surgery he had after the car accident.

On December 21, 2012, he signed with the German club Skyliners Frankfurt for the rest of the season. On July 1, 2013, he re-signed with Skyliners for one more season. On October 29, 2013, he parted ways with Skyliners. On November 5, 2013, he joined the Israeli club Barak Netanya for a tryout. He later extended his contract with Netanya for the rest of the season.

On July 23, 2014, he signed a one-year contract with the Italian club Pallacanestro Varese. On January 19, 2015, he parted ways with Varese. The next day, he signed with the German club Brose Baskets for the rest of the season.

On August 2, 2015, he signed a one-year deal with Auxilium CUS Torino of Italy. In November 2015, he left Torino after appearing in eight games. On January 8, 2016, he signed with Union Olimpija of Slovenia for the rest of the season.

On September 22, 2016, he signed with Italian club Tezenis Verona for the 2016–17 season.

In December 2017, Robinson announced his retirement.
