= Guy Muya =

Belgian-Congolese basketball player

Personal information
- Born: 23 May 1983 (age 43) Kinshasa, Zaire
- Listed height: 195 cm (6 ft 5 in)
- Listed weight: 97 kg (214 lb)

Career information
- NBA draft: 2005: undrafted
- Playing career: 2000–2009
- Position: Shooting guard
- Number: 9, 11
- Coaching career: 2022–present

Career history

Playing
- 2000–2004: Verviers-Pepinster
- 2004–2006: Liège
- 2006: Oostende
- 2006–2007: Legea Scafati
- 2007–2008: Palma Aqua Magica
- 2008–2009: Autocid Burgos
- 2009: Verviers-Pepinster
- 2009–2012: Liège
- 2012–2014: Belfius Mons-Hainaut
- 2014–2015: Oostende
- 2015–2019: Phoenix Brussels

Coaching
- 2022–2024: Antwerp Giants (assistant)

Career highlights
- As player: PBL champion (2015); Belgian Supercup champion (2009); As team manager/assistant coach: Belgian Cup winner (2023)

Guy Muya (born 23 May 1983) is a Belgian-Congolese retired basketball player and current coach. He was the captain of the Belgian national basketball team and represented the team at two EuroBasket tournaments, in 2011 and 2013.

== Professional career ==
Muya started his career in 2000 and played in Belgium, Italy and Spain. In June 2019, Muya retired as professional player and became team manager for Antwerp Giants.

== Executive and coaching career ==
After three seasons serving as sports manager of Antwerp Giants, he also became assistant coach of the team in 2022.

== National team career ==
Muya played for the Belgium national basketball team and played with his country at the 2011 EuroBasket and 2013 EuroBasket.
