= TSV Oberhaching Tropics =

- Leagues: ProB
- Founded: 1952; 73 years ago
- Arena: Grundschule Deisenhofen
- Location: Oberhaching, Munich, Germany
- Head coach: Mario Matic
- Website: Official website
Home	Away

TSV Oberhaching Tropics is a German professional basketball team located in Oberhaching, Munich. The team competes in Germany's ProB league.

As of 2019, its coach has been Mario Matic and as of 2020, its team captain has been Moritz Wohlers.

== Notable players ==
- Set a club record or won an individual award as a professional player.
- Played at least one official international match for his senior national team at any time.

- (Germany) Robert Maras
- (France) Joris Ortega
