= Predrag Krunić =

Bosnia and Herzegovina basketball coach

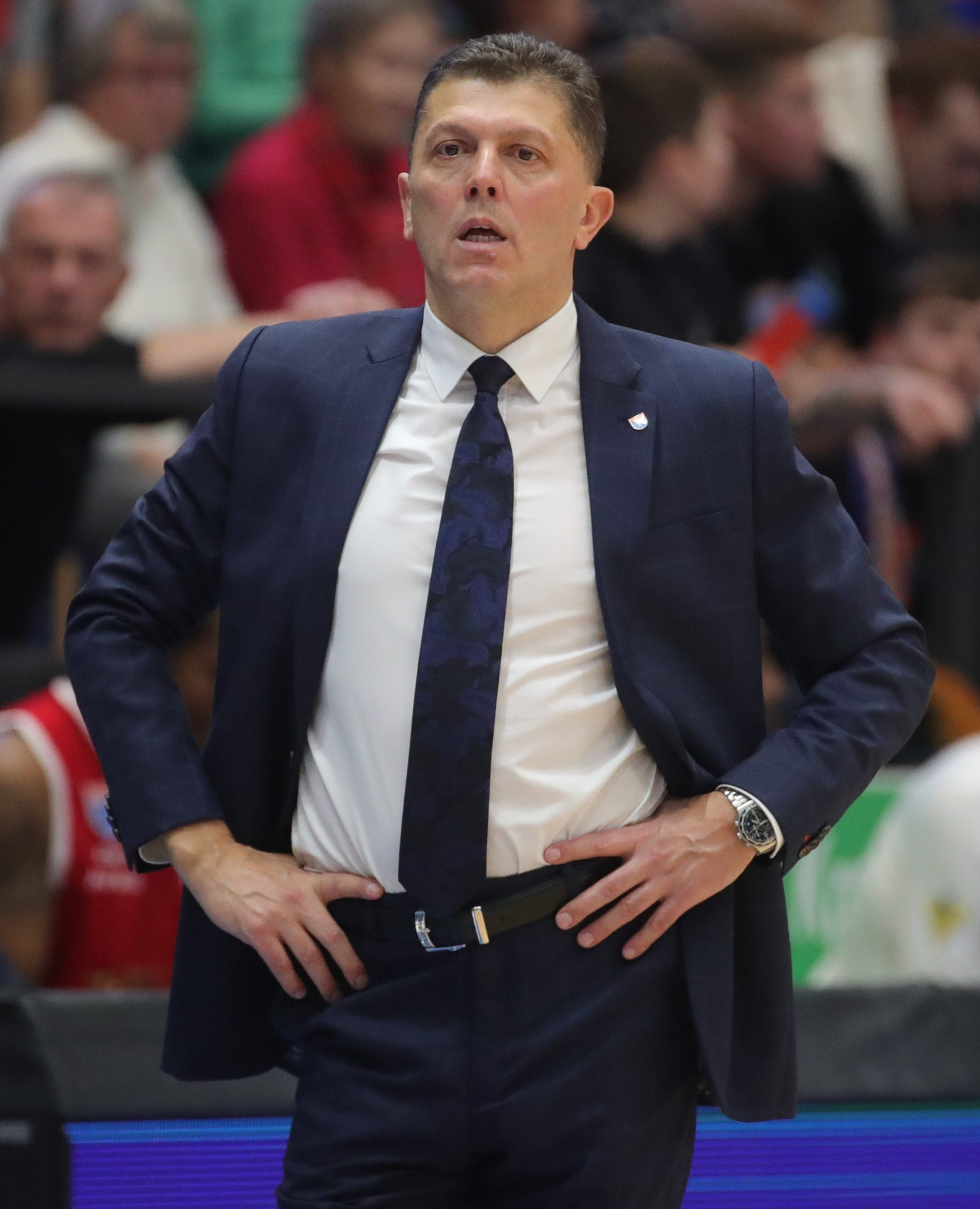

Hapoel Holon
- Position: Head coach
- League: Israeli Basketball Premier League

Personal information
- Born: 27 November 1967 (age 58)
- Coaching career: 1994–present

Career history

Coaching
- 1994–1998: Zemun
- 1998–2001: Bonn (assistant)
- 2001–2005: Bonn
- 2007–2012: Oldenburg
- 2013: Bayreuth
- 2014–2015: Włocławek
- 2015–2016: Mitteldeutscher
- 2016–2019: Bonn
- 2019–2021: Avtodor
- 2021–2022: Kagoshima Rebnise
- 2022–2024: Mitteldeutscher
- 2024–2025: Kobe Storks
- 2025: Oldenburg
- 2026–present: Hapoel Holon

Predrag Krunić (born 27 November 1967) is a Bosnia and Herzegovina professional basketball coach for Hapoel Holon of the Israeli Basketball Premier League. He has previously coached in Japan, Germany, and Poland, and achieved the highlight of his career in 2009 with EWE Baskets Oldenburg, when he won the Basketball Bundesliga (BBL).
