= Ryan Brooks =

American basketball player

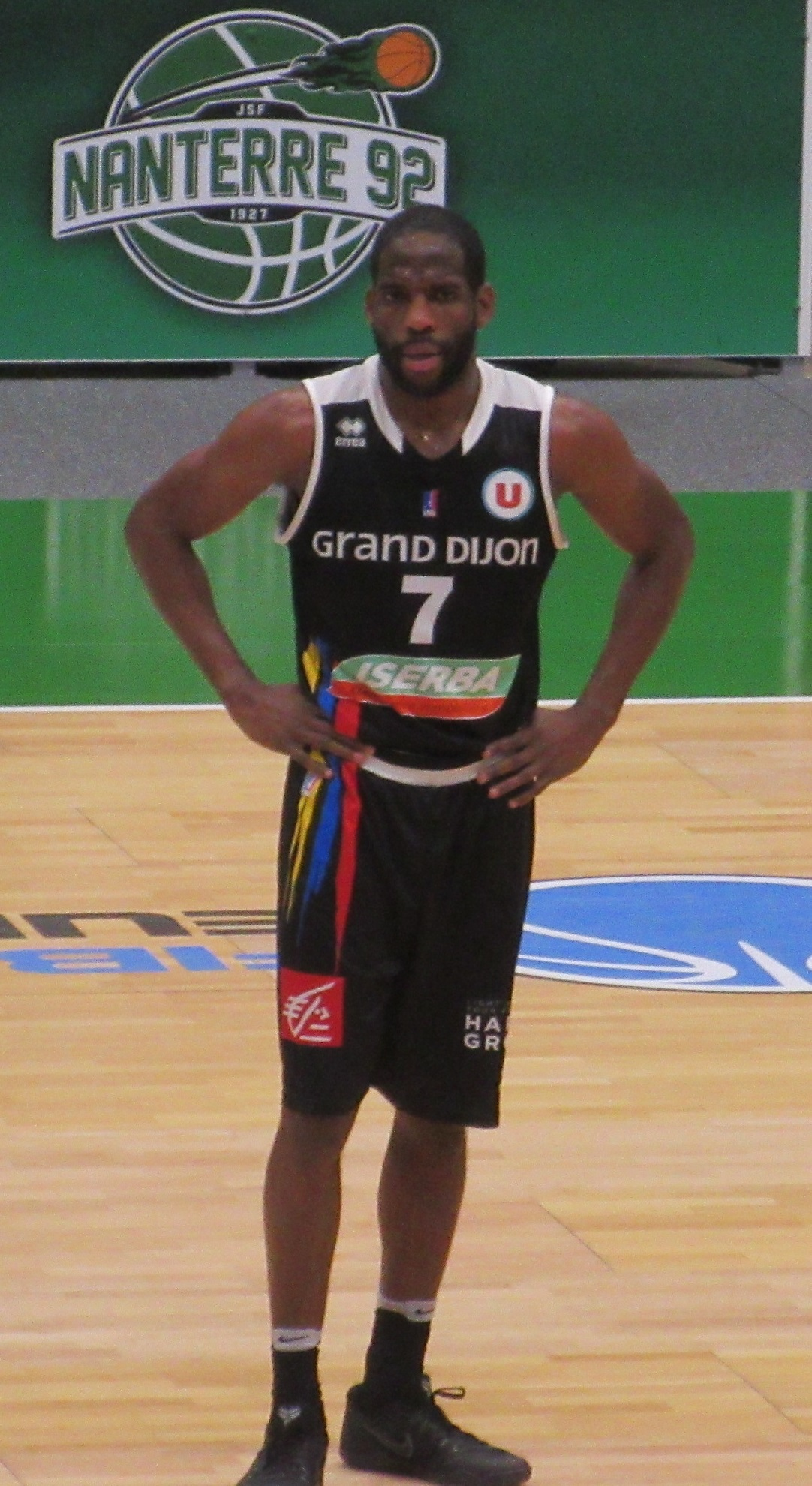
- Brooks with JDA Dijon in 2017

No. 7 – Tigers Tübingen
- Position: Guard
- League: Basketball Bundesliga

Personal information
- Born: April 12, 1988 (age 38) New Orleans, Louisiana, U.S.
- Listed height: 6 ft 4 in (1.93 m)
- Listed weight: 196 lb (89 kg)

Career information
- High school: Lower Merion (Ardmore, Pennsylvania)
- College: Temple (2006–2010)
- NBA draft: 2010: undrafted
- Playing career: 2010–present

Career history
- 2010–2011: LTi Gießen 46ers
- 2011–2012: Namika Lahti
- 2012–2013: LTi Gießen 46ers
- 2013: Skyliners Frankfurt
- 2013–2015: Telekom Baskets Bonn
- 2015–2017: JDA Dijon
- 2017–present: Tigers Tübingen

Ryan Anthony Brooks (born April 12, 1988) is an American professional basketball player for Tigers Tübingen of the German Basketball Bundesliga.

Brooks was born in New Orleans, Louisiana, and raised in Narberth, Pennsylvania. He played college basketball at Temple University.

== College career ==
As a senior at Temple, Brooks was the team's highest scorer, with an average of 14.3 points per game, and averages of 4.2 rebounds and 2.3 assists per game. He was selected for the all-Atlantic 10 second team and finished his career with 1,225 points.
