= Jason Love (basketball) =

American basketball player (born 1987)

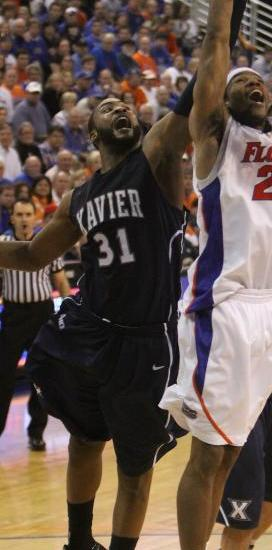

Atlanta Hawks
- Title: Assistant coach
- League: NBA

Personal information
- Born: September 15, 1987 (age 39) Philadelphia, Pennsylvania
- Listed height: 6 ft 9 in (2.06 m)
- Listed weight: 264 lb (120 kg)

Career information
- High school: Abington Friends School (Jenkintown, Pennsylvania)
- College: Xavier (2006–2010)
- NBA draft: 2010: undrafted
- Playing career: 2011–2018
- Position: Power forward / center
- Coaching career: 2018–present

Career history

Playing
- 2011–2012: VOO Wolves Verviers-Pepinster
- 2012–2013: Antwerp Giants
- 2013–2015: Belfius Mons-Hainaut
- 2015: Maccabi Kiryat Gat
- 2015–2016: Limburg United
- 2016: TED Ankara Kolejliler
- 2016–2017: Khimik
- 2017: Belfius Mons-Hainaut
- 2018: Unión de Santa Fe

Coaching
- 2018–2025: Philadelphia 76ers (assistant)
- 2024–2026: Milwaukee Bucks (assistant)
- 2026–present: Atlanta Hawks (assistant)

Career highlights
- As a player: Third-team All-Atlantic 10 (2010); As assistant coach: NBA Cup champion (2024)

Jason Sidney Love (born September 15, 1987) is an American professional basketball coach and former player who is currently an assistant for the Atlanta Hawks of the National Basketball Association (NBA). He played college basketball at Xavier University.

== Professional career ==
Love went undrafted in the 2010 NBA draft. In July 2011, he signed with VOO Wolves Verviers-Pepinster of Belgium for the 2011–12 season.

In June 2012, he signed with Antwerp Giants for the 2012–13 season.

In June 2013, he signed with Belfius Mons-Hainaut for the 2013–14 season. In December 2013, he was named Eurocup MVP for Round 9. In July 2014, he re-signed with Belfius Mons-Hainaut for one more season.

On August 15, 2015, Love signed with Maccabi Kiryat Gat of the Israeli Premier League. On December 22, 2015, he left Kiryat Gat and returned to Belgium where he signed with Limburg United for the rest of the season.

On September 27, 2016, Love signed with TED Ankara Kolejliler for the 2016–17 season. In November 2016, he left TED Ankara after appearing in six games. In early December 2016, he signed with Ukrainian club Khimik for the rest of the season. On October 23, 2017, he re-signed with Khimik. On December 12, 2017, he left Khimik and signed a one-month deal with Belfius Mons-Hainaut. On March 10, 2018, Love signed with Unión de Santa Fe.

== Coaching career ==
Love started as a player development coach in 2019 for the Philadelphia 76ers under Brett Brown. 2023, Love was hired by the Philadelphia 76ers as part of Nick Nurse's coaching staff. The following year, he became an assistant for the Milwaukee Bucks under head coach Doc Rivers.

On September 16, 2026, Love was hired to serve as an assistant coach for the Atlanta Hawks under head coach Quin Snyder.
