= Benas Veikalas =

Lithuanian basketball player

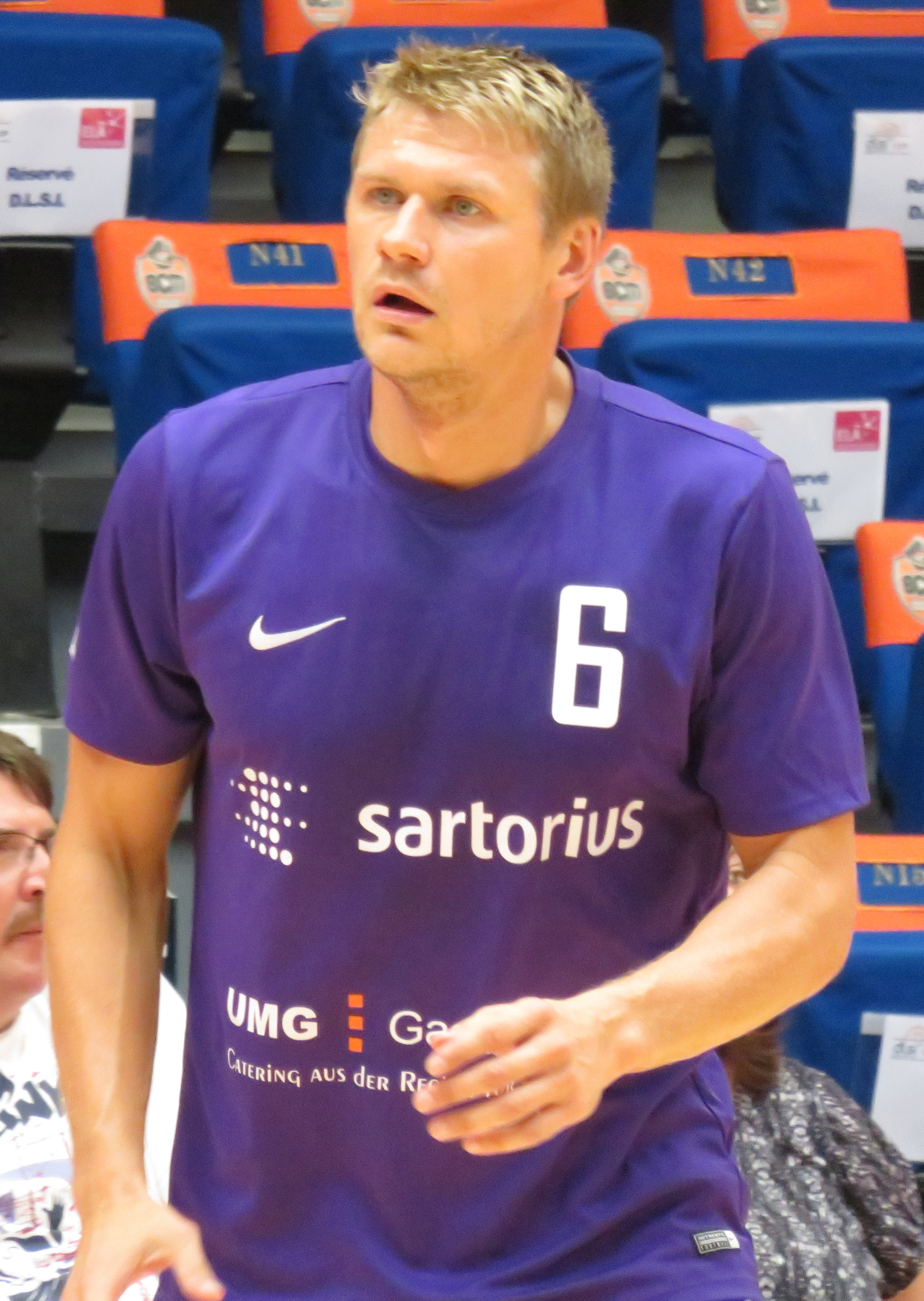
- Veikalas with BG Göttingen in 2016

Personal information
- Born: September 24, 1983 (age 43) Joniškis, Lithuanian SSR, Soviet Union
- Listed height: 6 ft 4 in (1.93 m)
- Listed weight: 198 lb (90 kg)

Career information
- High school: Horizon (San Diego, California)
- College: Metro State (2002–2004, 2006–2007)
- NBA draft: 2007: undrafted
- Playing career: 2007–2018
- Position: Shooting guard
- Number: 6

Career history
- 2007–2009: Nevėžis
- 2009–2011: Prostějov
- 2011–2015: Telekom Baskets Bonn
- 2015–2016: Sidigas Avellino
- 2016–2017: BG Göttingen

Benas Veikalas (born 24 September 1983) is a Lithuanian former professional basketball player. He can play both guard positions, but prefers the shooting guard position.

== Early career ==
Born in Joniškis, Veikalas moved to the United States at the age of 18 and played basketball at Horizon High School in San Diego, California, winning a state championship. After high school, he was recruited by Mike Dunlap to play for Metropolitan State University of Denver, an NCAA Division II two time National Championship team. He led the team his senior year, averaging 9.2 points, 3.3 rebounds and 2.1 assists in 22 minutes per game.

== Professional career ==
Veikalas returned to Lithuania for his first season as a professional. He played for BC Nevėžis of LKL. After two successful seasons, he moved to Czech Republic and signed with BK Prostějov. With BK Prostějov, Veikalas led the team in scoring, played Euro- challenge, and the team finished runner up in the National Title games, 2 years in a row and named to the Czech all star team. After 2 seasons with BK Prostějov, In 2011, he joined Telekom Baskets Bonn. With Telekom Bonn, he led in scoring, was voted to the National All Star Team, was Voted to All Decade Legend team, made 3 appearances in the top 4 German national cup, played across Europe in the Euro-Cup, and was team captain. In the summer of 2012 he was named as alternate to the Lithuania National Team for the Olympic Games in London. In 2013, Veikalas extended his contract with the team for two more seasons. In 2015, and 4 years in Bonn, Veikalas signed with S.S. Scandone Veikalas played in the Euro-Cup, National Italian Top 4, and finished in the top 4 of National Playoffs, and was voted to the Italian All Star Team. Veikalas returned to Germany to finish his career in 2016–2017. BG Goettingen Veikalas was offered an additional contract in Göttingen, however decided it was time to retire. Since retiring he has gone to coaching his children in the US in both school teams, rec and AAU. He also gives private lessons to up and coming basketball players.

== Personal life ==
Benas Veikalas is married to Stacey Veikalas and they have 3 children. Anthony Veikalas, Vincas Veikalas, & Amber Veikalas.
