= Telekom Dome =

Indoor sports arena in Bonn, Germany

Coordinates: 50°42′21.73″N 7°03′35.31″E

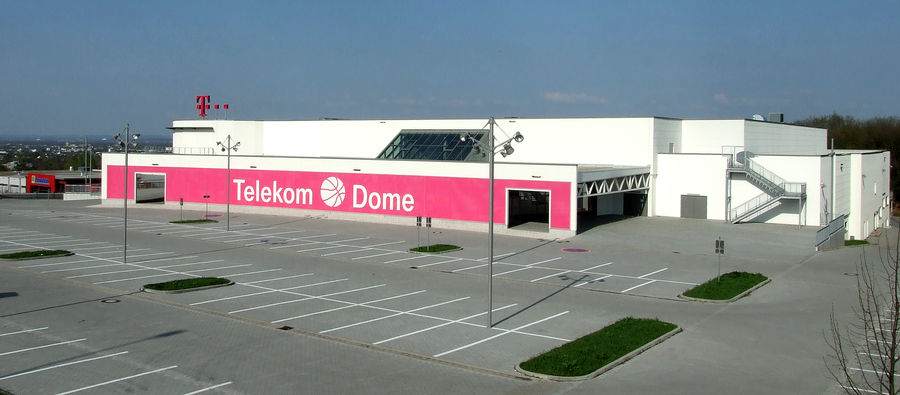
- Interactive map of Telekom Dome
- Location: Bonn, North Rhine-Westphalia; Germany
- Owner: City of Bonn
- Operator: Municipality of Bonn
- Capacity: 6,000 (Basketball)

Construction
- Groundbreaking: February, 2007
- Opened: June, 2008
- Cost: €16.8 million euros
- Architects: Jan van Dorp Architektur, Bonn

Tenant
- Telekom Baskets Bonn (BBL) (2008–present)

Telekom Dome is an indoor sporting arena that is located in Bonn, Germany. The seating capacity of the arena for basketball games is 6,000 spectators.

== History ==
Telekom Dome opened in 2008. It has been used as the home arena of the professional German Basketball League team Telekom Baskets Bonn. It replaced the club's former home arena, the Hardtberghalle.

== Gallery ==
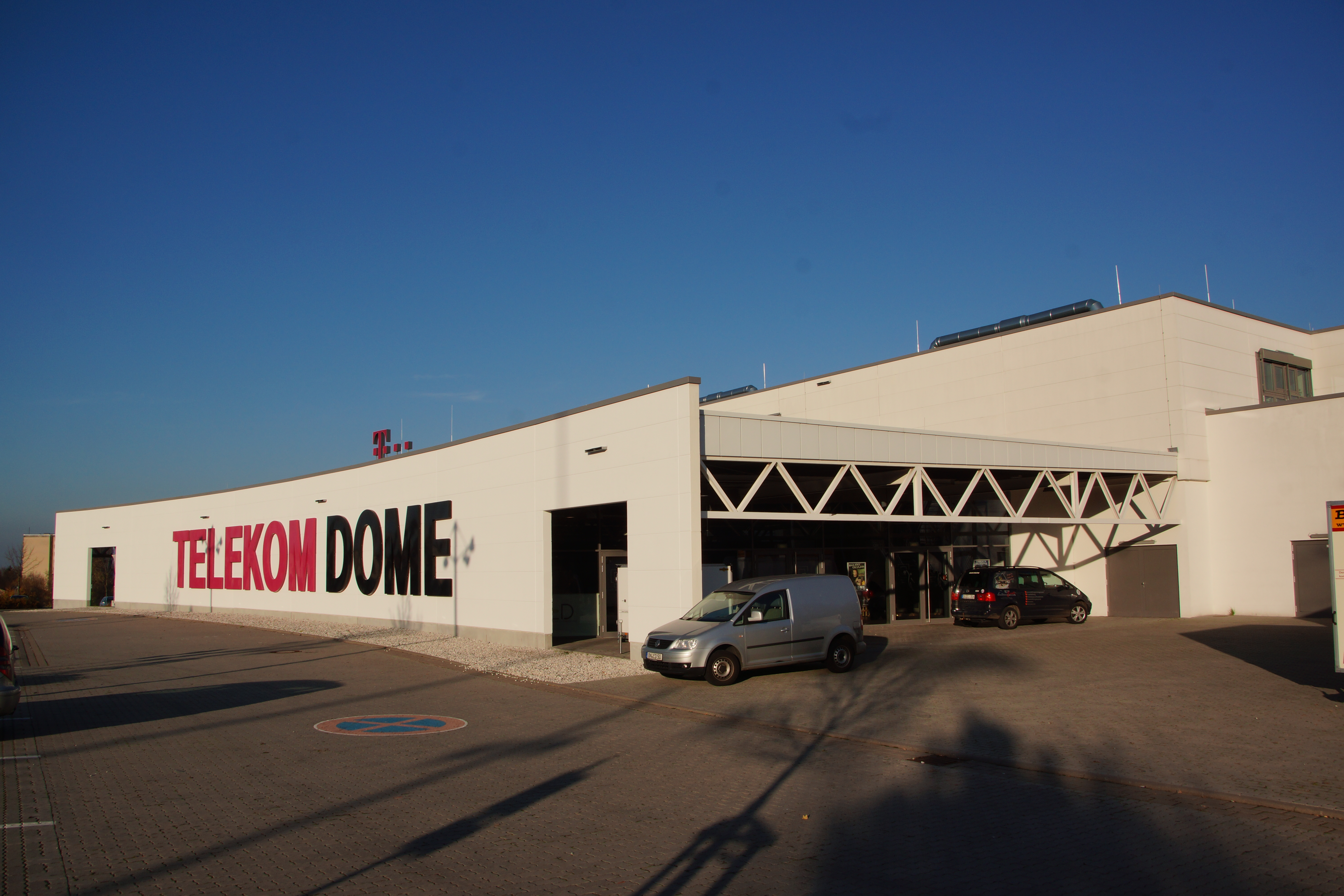
Telekom Dome

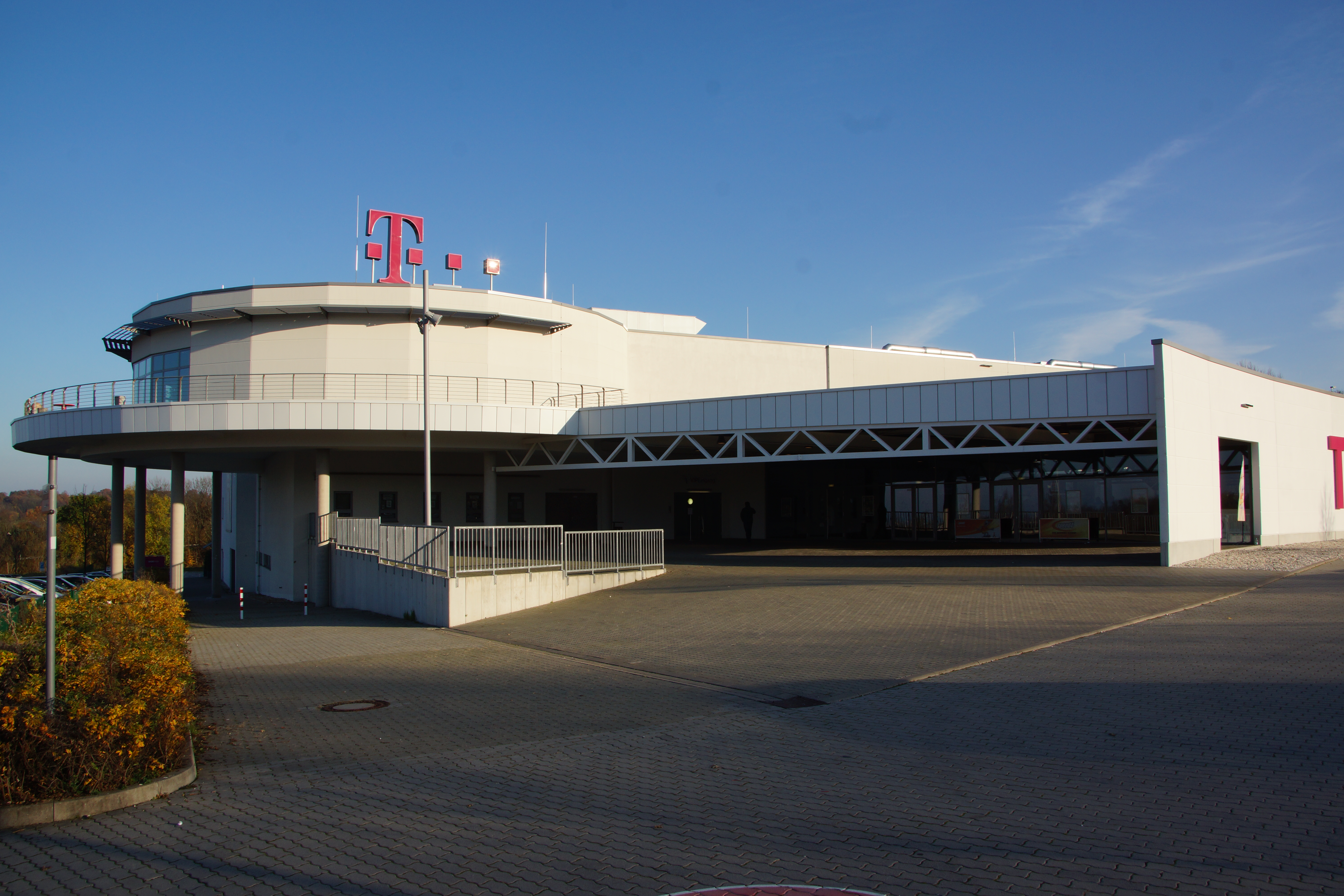
Entrance

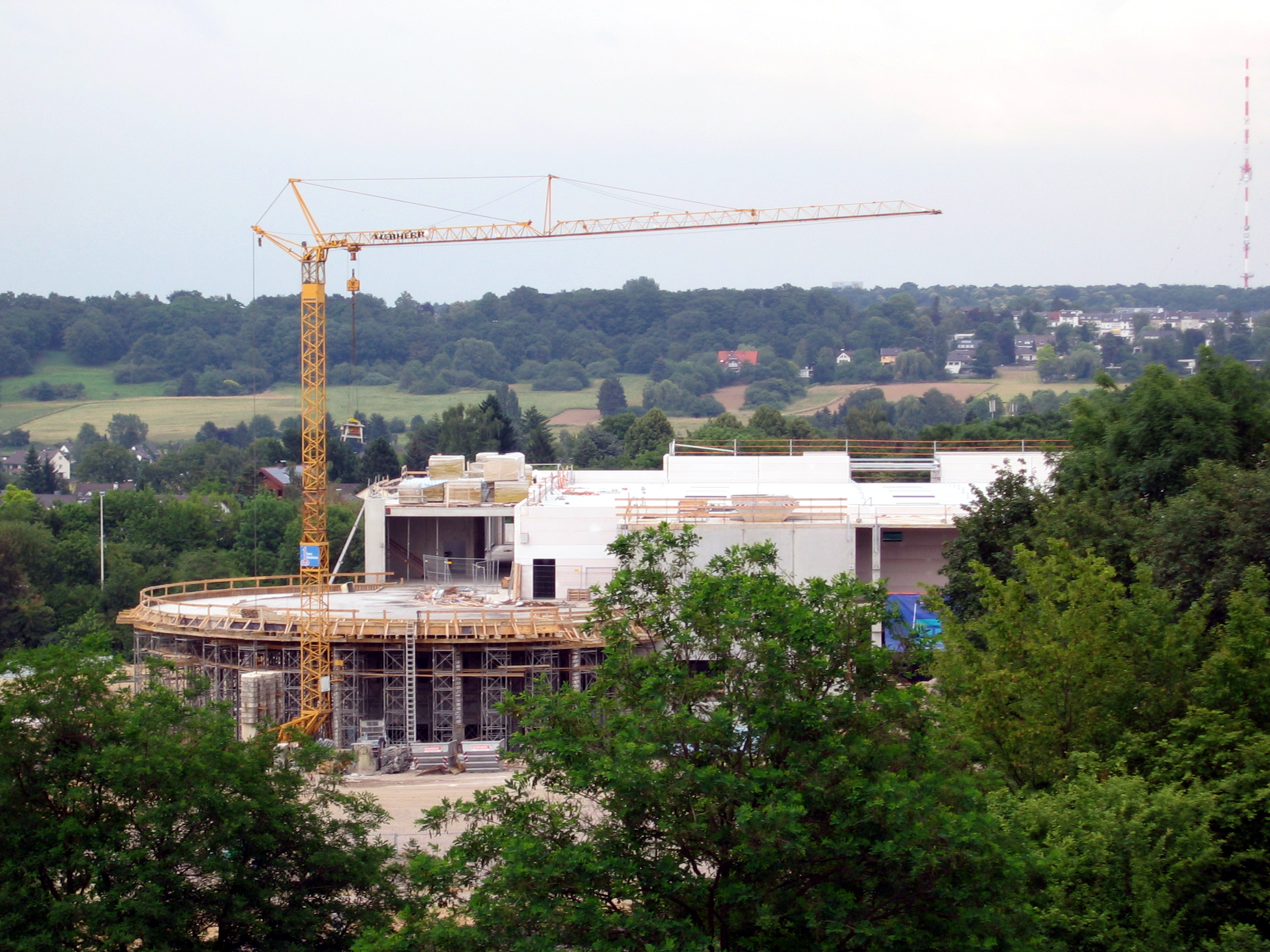
Telekom Dome under construction
