= Telekom Baskets Bonn =

Professional basketball team in Bonn, Germany

- Leagues: Basketball Bundesliga; Champions League
- Founded: 1992; 34 years ago
- History: BG Bonn 92 (1992–1995); Telekom Baskets Bonn (1995–present)
- Arena: Telekom Dome
- Capacity: 6,000
- Location: Bonn, Germany
- Team colors: Magenta, white, black
- President: Wolfgang Wiedlich
- Head coach: Marko Stankovic
- Championships: 1 Champions League (2023)
- Website: telekom-baskets-bonn.de
Home	Away

Telekom Baskets Bonn is a professional basketball club based in Bonn, Germany. The club competes in the Basketball Bundesliga, the top tier of German basketball and the Basketball Champions League. The club's sponsor is the T-Mobile brand, which is a subsidiary of the German telecommunications company Deutsche Telekom. The club's home arena is the Telekom Dome.

Bonn reached the German league Final Four nine times in 17 years of league affiliation. The team reached the final six times – in 1997, 1999, 2001, 2008, 2009 and 2023, but came up short on each occasion. In the 2022–23 season, Bonn won the Basketball Champions League, Europe's top-level competition organised by FIBA. It was the first title in club history, and Bonn became the first German club to win the competition.

== History ==
=== The beginning ===
The Telekom Baskets Bonn was founded in 1992 when the German clubs Godesberger Turnverein 1888 eV (Godesberg Gymnastics Club) and SC Fortuna Bonn merged. The basketball team of the Godesberger TV had been founded in 1970, whereas the SC Fortuna Bonn had been founded in 1973. The Godesberger TV was promoted to the Basketball Bundesliga in 1990. A year later, the club was relegated, and the associated economic problems eventually lead to the 1992 merger of the departments of the two basketball teams to BG Bonn 92. The following year, the club switched names to Post SV Bonn. In 1995, the club switched names again to Telekom Baskets Bonn, sponsored by the German telecommunications company Deutsche Telekom.

=== Entry of the Deutsche Telekom and early years in the Bundesliga ===
In April 1995, the Telekom Baskets Bonn declared their goal to be promoted to the Bundesliga in 1997. But already in the 1995–96 season the team finished the second division unbeaten and moved up to Germany's prime basketball league. There, the Baskets managed to establish themselves immediately, supported by an ecstatic home crowd at the newly built Hardtberghalle of the Hardtberg School Center. In their first season the Baskets reached the finals of the German championship where they lost 3–1 against Alba Berlin. In the following years they always reached the playoffs until the 2004–05 season. In 2005, the Baskets finished the regular season at the No. 9 position. Then coach Predrag Krunić was relieved of his duties. In December 2005, Michael Koch the former national team captain became the team's new head coach. Previously, for a few months Bonn was coached by Danijel Jusup.

From 1998 to 2002, the Baskets had a cooperation agreement with the SG Sechtem. This cooperation ended in 2002 due to a new strategic orientation of both clubs.

=== Moving to the Telekom Dome and the era Mike Koch ===
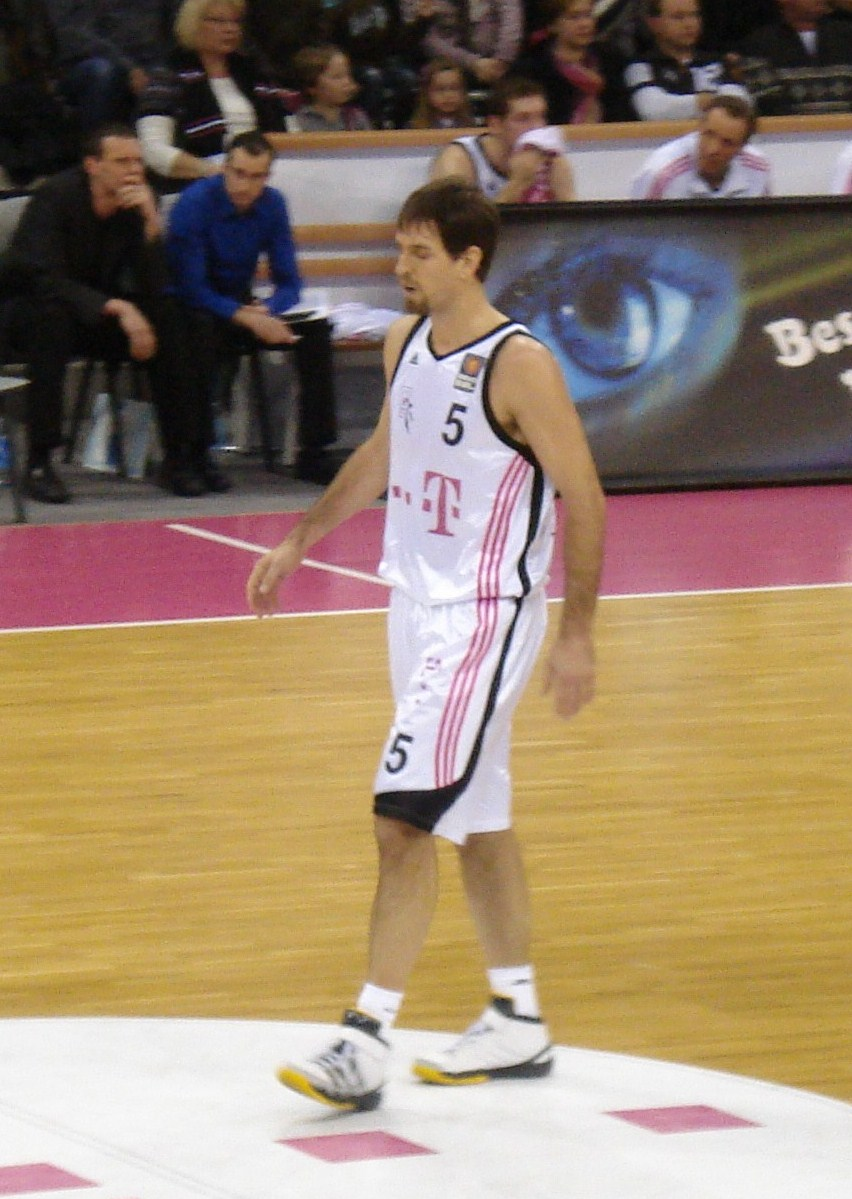
Chris Ensminger was the leading rebounder for three straight German League seasons and two straight EuroChallenge seasons.

In 2008, the Baskets moved from its previous venue, the Hardtberghalle, to the newly built Telekom Dome. Thus, the Telekom Baskets became Germany's first basketball club to build its own arena with adjoining training center.

The Baskets then intensified the training of their own youth players and in the 2006–07 season started a cooperation with former rival Dragons Rhöndorf. Under the name SG Bonn / Rhöndorf the club sent various youth teams to Germany's prime youth divisions. The club's aim was to increase the number of their own players to jump into the squad of the first team. The club's first success stories are both Fabian Thülig and Jonas Wohlfarth-Bottermann. Under coach Mike Koch the Baskets succeeded to the finals of the National Basketball League both in 2007–08, as well as in 2008–09. There, the Baskets finished runner-up to Alba Berlin and the EWE Baskets Oldenburg. The season 2010–11, however, was the weakest since the rise of the Telekom Baskets to Germany's first division. With only 14 wins and 20 defeats, the Baskets finished the season ranked 13th and missed the play-offs for only the second time in their club history.

For the 2011–12 season Mike Koch remained head coach of the Telekom Baskets and built a new squad. New additions such as Benas Veikalas, Tony Gaffney, Talor Battle, Daniel Hain and Andrej Mangold and most notably former player Jared Jordan joined the team. Together they led the team through a regular season full of ups and downs. At the end they finished at the eighth spot with 18 wins and 16 defeats. In the quarterfinals of the playoffs, the Baskets were subject to a 3–1 loss as they were beaten in four matches by defending champions Brose Baskets Bamberg. The Baskets Bonn also reached the Cup final where they were also beaten by Bamberg at Bonn's own court.

2012–13, the Baskets qualified for the play-offs again. Overall, the team finished the season ranked seventh in the regular season. A few months into the season the team was supplemented by forward Jamel McLean, who replaced Patrick Ewing Jr. In the quarterfinals, the Baskets met the EWE Baskets Oldenburg. There, the Baskets Bonn were eliminated in five games. After the season, the contract of coach Michael Koch was not extended, thus the Koch era ended after eight years as head coach of the team. When he left the club, he had been the longest serving head coach of the league.

=== Two new faces for the club's main tasks ===
In May 2013, as the successor to Michael Koch, the Telekom Baskets Bonn presented Mathias Fischer as the new head coach. Fischer had worked for the LTi Giessen 46ers before and had been responsible for several youth programs and national selections of Germany. Under his leadership, especially the youth development should expand and receive new impetus to the cooperation with the Dragons Rhöndorf. In addition to Fischer, the Baskets presented Michael Wichterich as new full-time sports manager. Wichterich is a former player of the Baskets and the Dragons Rhöndorf. He had previously worked for the Dragons where he was in a similar position as Arvid Kramer in 2004. Wichterich is only the second full-time manager of the club. The previous manager Andreas Boettcher is still involved in management.

After two seasons at the helm that included solid regular season results and first round exits in the playoffs, Bonn got off to a 6–1 start in 2015–16 before breaking down in a major way. The Baskets finished with a 12–22 record that included a string of 14 consecutive losses in BBL and FIBA EuroCup, culminating in Fischer's dismissal. He was replaced by interim coach Carsten Pohl and later succeeded by Silvano Poropat. Following the conclusion of the regular season, the management also decided to part ways with point guard Andrej Mangold who had been with Bonn for five years.

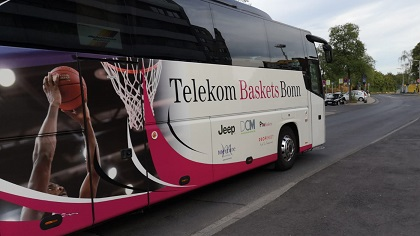
Baskets Bonn team bus in 2018.

After Poropat left the team in September 2016 due to an undisclosed illness, former coach Predrag Krunić returned to Bonn for a second coaching stint. Major additions for the 2016–17 season included former Bamberg player Ryan Thompson, point guard Josh Mayo, and center Julian Gamble.

In the 2016–17 season, the Baskets bounced back by reaching a playoff-spot and finished the regular season on the seventh place with an 18–14 record. In the playoffs, Bonn managed to win the first game of the quarterfinals against the defending champs Brose Bamberg, but ended up losing the series 3–1.

The following 2017–18 season, Bonn nearly could gain home court advantage in the first round of the playoffs, but just came up short in this race despite finishing on a good fifth place with a 21–13 record. In the quarterfinals, the Baskets played against Brose Bamberg again but could not get a win this time by losing the quarterfinal series 3–0.

After winning the first three games in the 2018–19 season, the Baskets lost eight out of the next ten regular season games. In January 2019 former assistant coach Chris O’Shea became head coach right before the German cup semifinals, which Bonn lost 87:90 against Brose Bamberg who ended up winning the cup. Bonn won eight out of the next eleven games and finished the regular season with an impressive 102:98 home win against Bayern Munich, who won the German league title in the last two years. In the playoffs, Bonn had to play EWE Baskets Oldenburg and lost the series 3–0.

In February 2020, after 17 match days, the club announced the hiring of Will Voigt as head coach of the team, who previously coached Angola's national team. He is the successor of Thomas Päch, who was assigned as head coach in summer 2019. The results of the regular Basketball Bundesliga season (BBL) did not meet overall's expectations, whereas in the Basketball Champions League, Telekom Baskets Bonn have reached the round of the last 16 remaining teams and compete against AEK Athens in the first round of the Play-offs. Voigt ended his first Bonn stint at the conclusion of the 2019–20 season, but was hired again in January 2021, when Bonn fired Igor Jovović. Voigt parted ways with Bonn after the 2020–21 season, Tuomas Iisalo was appointed the new head coach in May 2021.

=== The Iisalo legacy and Champions League title (2021–2023) ===
The Iisalo brothers, Tuomas (head coach) and Joonas (associate head coach), took Bonn from a medium power to second place in the 2021–22 Basketball Bundesliga and qualified for the Bundesliga playoff semifinals. Point guard Parker Jackson-Cartwright was named BBL MVP. The Iisalos' tactics were known for a lot of passing.

In 2022, Joonas left Bonn to become head coach at MLP Academics Heidelberg. Tuomas continued as Bonn's head coach.

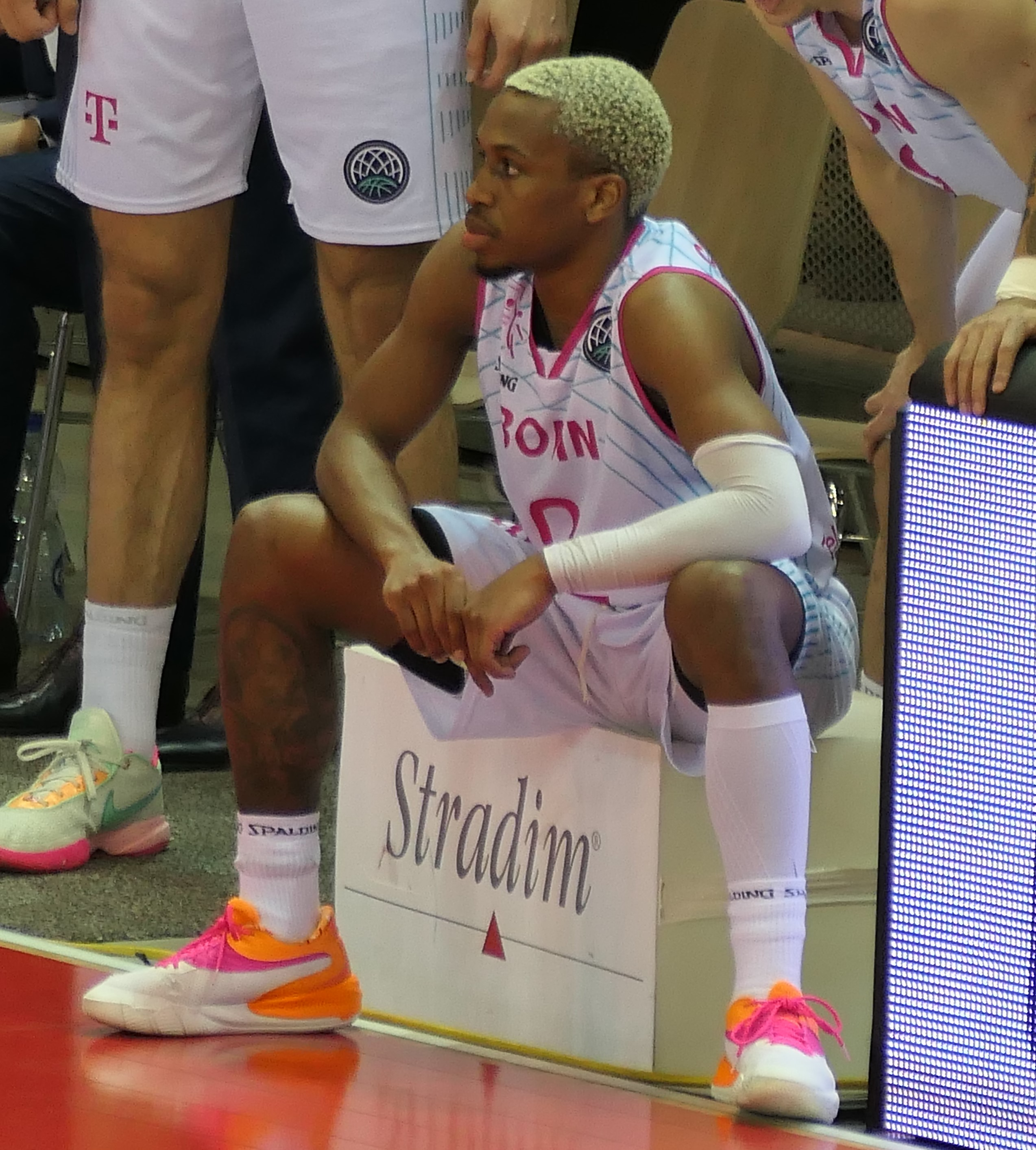
T. J. Shorts had a historic season for Bonn as he won three MVP awards in the 2022–23 season

During the 2022–23 season, Bonn finished as first seed in the 2022–23 Basketball Bundesliga after their 32–2 record in the regular season. On 4 May 2023, Bonn's Macedonian-American point guard T. J. Shorts was named the BBL MVP, as well as the Basketball Champions League MVP. On 14 May 2023, Bonn won the 2022–23 Basketball Champions League championship, the club's first ever trophy. They defeated Israeli club Hapoel Jerusalem in the final of the Final Four in Málaga. Shorts was named the Final Four MVP.

=== Roel Moors takes over (2023–2025) ===
In June 2023, Roel Moors took over as Bonn's new head coach. The unexpected Champions League title had drastically increased the team's marked value which caused the players and coaches to accept higher salaries elsewhere. Bonn went through a complete restructure. Yet, the success of 2023 brought in price money which the Baskets used to hire new, internationally competitive players.

=== Marko Stankovic (2025–present) ===
On 21 January 2025, Telekom Baskets Bonn announced that Roel Moors had been placed on leave, with Marko Stankovic taking over the head coaching responsibilities. Stankovic, who has been an assistant coach at Telekom Baskets Bonn since June 2022 and helped secure the team's Basketball Champions League title in May 2023, has been promoted to head coach.

== Arenas ==
- 1995–1996: Sportpark Pennenfeld (capacity: 700)
- 1996–2008: Hardtberghalle (capacity: 3,500)
- Since 2008: Telekom Dome (capacity: 6,000)

== Kit manufacturer ==
- 1996–2010: Adidas
- 2015–2023: Spalding
- 2024–present: Adidas

== Youth development ==
Through building the Telekom Dome, the Baskets have further professionalized and intensified their youth work and, together with the cooperation partner Dragons Rhöndorf, offer a consistent system for young players for personal and sporting development. This includes a wide range of teams which practice and compete in the Telekom Dome. Several players, such as Fabian Thülig, Jonas Wohlfarth-Bottermann and Florian Koch are examples of players from the Baskets youth who became starters in at least several Basketball Bundesliga games. Previously, all three played for the Dragons Rhöndorf in the Pro A, and Pro B.

== Players ==
=== Current roster ===
Note: Flags indicate national team eligibility at FIBA-sanctioned events. Players may hold other non-FIBA nationalities not displayed.

Telekom Baskets Bonn roster
Players
Coaches

Pos.	No.	Nat.	Name	Ht.	Wt.	Age	From
G	0	(United States)	Foster, Marcus	1.96 m (6 ft 5 in)	102 kg (225 lb)	24 – 6 January 2002	Mitteldeutscher
G	1	(United States)	Wright, John-Michael	1.85 m (6 ft 1 in)	86 kg (190 lb)	25 – 1 February 2001	Dubrava
F	2	(United States)	Comithier, Alijah	2.01 m (6 ft 7 in)	91 kg (201 lb)	25 – 13 May 2001	Dziki Warsaw
PF	4	(United States)	Garrett, Jeff	2.01 m (6 ft 7 in)	100 kg (220 lb)	31 – 8 December 1994	Niners Chemnitz
SF	5	(United States)	Birts, Tylan	1.98 m (6 ft 6 in)	100 kg (220 lb)	30 – 8 November 1996	Basketball Nymburk
C	6	(Germany)	Kessens, Michael	2.06 m (6 ft 9 in)	103 kg (227 lb)	35 – 16 February 1991	Alba Berlin
PG	7	(United States)	Murphy, Grayson	1.88 m (6 ft 2 in)	86 kg (190 lb)	27 – 4 February 1999	South Bay Lakers
G	8	(Germany) (Turkey)	Reinhart, Kenan	1.94 m (6 ft 4 in)	81 kg (179 lb)	19 – 4 May 2007	Dragons Rhöndorf
SF	9	(Canada)	Paulo, Mychael	1.98 m (6 ft 6 in)		28 – 22 March 1998
C	10	(Germany)	Schmid, Carlo	2.05 m (6 ft 9 in)	96 kg (212 lb)	19 – 27 May 2007
G	11	(Serbia)	Kovačević, Aleksa	1.90 m (6 ft 3 in)	80 kg (176 lb)	24 – 5 March 2002	Mitteldeutscher
PF	12	(Germany)	Jostmann, Melvin	2.01 m (6 ft 7 in)	106 kg (234 lb)	26 – 12 July 2000	Karlsruhe Lions
C	15	(Canada)	Jongkuch, Kur	2.06 m (6 ft 9 in)	104 kg (229 lb)	27 – 18 May 1999	Vancouver Bandits
C	16	(Germany)	Sadikovic, Benjamin	2.08 m (6 ft 10 in)	100 kg (220 lb)	23 – 29 May 2003
SG	21	(Germany)	Aminu, Joel	1.92 m (6 ft 4 in)	92 kg (203 lb)	29 – 22 April 1997	Rasta Vechta
C	22	(Germany)	Kratzer, Leon	2.11 m (6 ft 11 in)	111 kg (245 lb)	29 – 4 February 1997	Bayern Munich
SF	23	(Germany)	Onyejiaka, Justin	1.95 m (6 ft 5 in)	90 kg (198 lb)	22 – 6 June 2004	RheinStars Köln
F	33	(Germany)	Heckmann, Patrick	1.98 m (6 ft 6 in)	100 kg (220 lb)	34 – 27 February 1992	Skyliners Frankfurt

Head coach

- (Serbia) Marko Stankovic

Assistant coach(es)

- (Belgium) Lionel Bosco
- (France) Thomas Pennellier

Strength & conditioning coach(es)

- (Spain) Eduardo Fernandez Galarreta

Legend

- (C) Team captain
- (ProB) On assignment to ProB
  side Dragons Rhöndorf.
- Injured

- Roster
Updated: September 1, 2026

=== Depth chart ===
Pos.	Starting 5	Bench 1	Bench 2
C	Michael Kessens	Leon Kratzer	Kur Jongkuch
PF	Jeff Garrett	Patrick Heckmann	Melvin Jostmann
SF	Tylan Birts	Alijah Comithier	Justin Onyejiaka
SG	Joel Aminu	Marcus Foster	Kenan Reinhart
PG	Grayson Murphy	John-Michael Wright	Aleksa Kovačević

== Head coaches ==
- (United States) John Ecker (1993–1995)
- (Croatia) Bruno Socé (1995–2001)
- (Bosnia and Herzegovina) Predrag Krunić: (2001–2005)
- (Croatia) Danijel Jusup (2005)
- (Germany) Michael Koch (2005–2013)
- (Germany) Mathias Fischer (2013–2015)
- (Germany) Carsten Pohl (2015–2016)
- (Croatia) Silvano Poropat (2016)
- (Bosnia and Herzegovina) Predrag Krunić (2016–2019)
- (United States) Chris O'Shea (2019)
- (Germany) Thomas Päch (2019–2020)
- (United States) Will Voigt (2020)
- (Montenegro) Igor Jovović (2020–2021)
- (United States) Will Voigt (2021)
- (Finland) Tuomas Iisalo (2021–2023)
- (Belgium) Roel Moors (2023–2025)
- (Serbia) Marko Stankovic (2025–present)

== Team and individual honours ==
=== Team honours ===
FIBA Intercontinential Cup

- Runners-up: 2023

Basketball Champions League

- Champions: 2022–23

Basketball Bundesliga

- Runners-up: 1996–97, 1998–99, 2000–01, 2007–08, 2008–09, 2022–23

BBL-Pokal

- Runners-up: 2005, 2009, 2012

2. Basketball Bundesliga

- Champions: 1995–96

=== Individual honours ===
BBL Most Valuable Player

- Parker Jackson-Cartwright (2022)
- T. J. Shorts (2023)

BBL Coach of the Year

- Tuomas Iisalo (2022, 2023)

BBL Best Young Player

- Aleksandar Ćapin (2004)

BBL Most Improved Player

- Andrew Wisniewski (2006)

BBL Best Offensive Player

- Andrew Wisniewski (2006)

BBL Best Defender

- Oluoma Nnamaka (2004)
- Yorman Polas Bartolo (2018, 2019)

== Notable players ==
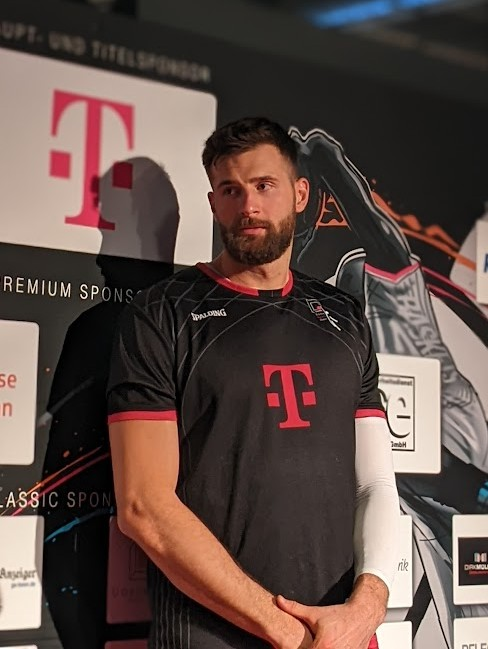
Leon Kratzer has played for the team from 2020 to 2023.

To appear in this section a player must have played at least two seasons for the club and either:

- Set a club record or won an individual award as a professional player
- Played at least one official international match for his senior national team at any time
- (Germany) Hurl Beechum (1998–2002)
- (Germany) Gunther Behnke (1996–2000)
- (Germany) Steven Hutchinson (1997–1999)
- (Germany) Alex King (2008–2011)
- (Germany) Konstantin Klein (2016–2018)
- (Germany) Leon Kratzer (2020–2023)
- (Germany) Dirk Mädrich (2014–2016)
- (Germany) Andrej Mangold (2011–2016)
- (Germany) Aleksandar Nadjfeji (2001–2005)
- (Germany) Tim Ohlbrecht (2009–2011)
- (Germany) Klaus Perwas (1995–1999)
- (Germany) Karsten Tadda (2021–2023)
- (Cuba) Yorman Polas Bartolo (2016–2020)
- (Croatia) Siniša Kelečević (1996–1998, 2000–2001, 2005–2006)
- (Lithuania) Tadas Klimavičius (2014–2016)
- (Lithuania) Benas Veikalas (2011–2015)
- (United States) Jason Conley (2005–2008)
- (United States) Chris Ensminger (2009–2013)
- (United States) Tony Gaffney (2011–12, 2013–2014)
- (United States) Julian Gamble (2016–2018)
- (United States) Jared Jordan (2009–2010, 2011–2014)
- (United States) Eugene Lawrence (2014–2016, 2020)
- (United States) Jamel McLean (2013–2014)
- (United States) Jeremy Morgan (2021–23)
- (United States) Derrick Phelps (1998–2000)
- (United States) Terrence Rencher (2001–2003)
- (United States) T. J. Shorts (2021–2023)
- (United States) Tyson Ward (2021–2023)

== Season-by-season record ==
Season	Tier	League	Pos.	German Cup	European competitions	
1992–93	2	2. BBL	7th			
1993–94	2	2. BBL	5th			
1994–95	2	2. BBL	7th			
1995–96	2	2. BBL	1st			
1996–97	1	Bundesliga	2nd	Semifinalist		
1997–98	1	Bundesliga	5th		3 Korać Cup	GS
1998–99	1	Bundesliga	2nd		3 Korać Cup	R32
1999–00	1	Bundesliga	4th		3 Korać Cup	R32
2000–01	1	Bundesliga	2nd		2 Saporta Cup	QF
2001–02	1	Bundesliga	4th		2 Saporta Cup	QF
2002–03	1	Bundesliga	3rd	Fourth position	2 ULEB Cup	RS
2003–04	1	Bundesliga	4th		2 ULEB Cup	RS
2004–05	1	Bundesliga	9th	Runner-up	2 ULEB Cup	RS
2005–06	1	Bundesliga	7th		3 FIBA EuroCup	RS
2006–07	1	Bundesliga	7th			
2007–08	1	Bundesliga	2nd			
2008–09	1	Bundesliga	2nd	Runner-up	3 EuroChallenge	QF
2009–10	1	Bundesliga	8th	Quarterfinalist	2 Eurocup	RS
2010–11	1	Bundesliga	13th		3 EuroChallenge	RS
2011–12	1	Bundesliga	8th	Runner-up	3 EuroChallenge	T16
2012–13	1	Bundesliga	7th		3 EuroChallenge	QF
2013–14	1	Bundesliga	6th	Quarterfinalist		
2014–15	1	Bundesliga	5th	Fourth position	2 Eurocup	RS
2015–16	1	Bundesliga	11th		2 Eurocup	RS
2016–17	1	Bundesliga	7th	Quarterfinalist	FIBA Europe Cup	SF
2017–18	1	Bundesliga	5th		Champions League	RS
2018–19	1	Bundesliga	7th	Semifinalist	Champions League	RS
2019–20	1	Bundesliga	15th	Quarterfinals	Champions League	R16
2020–21	1	Bundesliga	13th	Group stage		
2021–22	1	Bundesliga	3rd	Round of 16		
2022–23	1	Bundesliga	2nd	Round of 16	Champions League	C
2023–24	1	Bundesliga	7th	Quarterfinals	Champions League	QF
2024–25	1	Bundesliga	14th	Round of 16	Champions League	PI
2025–26	1	Bundesliga	4th	Round of 16		
2026–27	1	Bundesliga			Champions League	
