= András Ruják =

Hungarian basketball player (born 1988)

No. 9 – PVSK Panthers
- Position: Point guard
- League: NB I/A

Personal information
- Born: June 30, 1988 (age 38) Budapest, Hungary
- Listed height: 189 cm (6 ft 2 in)
- Listed weight: 85 kg (187 lb)

Career information
- NBA draft: 2010: undrafted
- Playing career: 2008–present

Career history
- 2008–2009: NTE-Hegyvidék
- 2009–2011: PVSK Panthers
- 2011–2013: Körmend
- 2013–2017: Soproni KC
- 2017–2019: Atomerőmű SE
- 2019–present: PVSK Panthers

András Ruják (born June 30, 1988) is a Hungarian professional basketball player for PVSK Panthers of the Nemzeti Bajnokság I/A. Ruják also played for the Hungarian national basketball team, as he was part of the roster that participated at EuroBasket 2017.
