= Šarlija =

Šarlija is a Croatian surname.

People with the surname include:

- Marijeta Šarlija (née Vidak; born 1992), Croatian handball player
- Marino Šarlija (born 1989), Croatian basketball player
- Marko Šarlija (born 1982), Croatian football goalkeeper
- Zvonimir Šarlija (born 1996), Croatian footballer
