= 2014–15 Nemzeti Bajnokság I/A (men's basketball) =

NB I/A
- Duration: October 4, 2014 - March 1, 2015 (regular season)
- Games played: 34 or 32
- Teams: 13 + 1
- TV partner: Duna World

Regular season
- Top seed: Atomerőmű SE
- Relegated: MAFC

Finals
- Champions: Szolnoki Olaj (6th title)
- Runners-up: KTE-Duna Aszfalt
- Third place: Atomerőmű SE
- Fourth place: Sopron KC

Statistical leaders
Points	(Serbia) Nermin Hujdurović	22.8
Rebounds	(United States) Ricardo Glenn	12.1
Assists	(Serbia) Branko Jereminov	6.0

The 2014–15 Nemzeti Bajnokság I/A was the 84th season of the Nemzeti Bajnokság I/A, the highest tier professional basketball league in Hungary. Szolnoki Olaj won its sixth national championship.

== Teams ==
The following 14 clubs competed in the NB I/A during the 2014–15 season:

Team	Position 2013-14	City	Arena	Capacity	Head coach	Kit manufacturer
Alba Fehérvár	6th	Székesfehérvár	Vodafone Sportcentrum	2,200	(Hungary) Norbert Székely	Spalding
Atomerőmű SE	2nd	Paks	ASE Sportcsarnok	1,500	(Serbia) Branislav Džunić	adidas
Falco KC	11th	Szombathely	Arena Savaria	3,200	(Hungary) László Kálmán	Spalding
Jászberényi KSE	10th	Jászberény	Belvárosi Általános Iskola	1,000	(Hungary) Tamás Bencze	Spalding
Kaposvári KK	4th	Kaposvár	Kaposvári Sportcsarnok	1,260	(Hungary) Ádám Fekete	Spalding
Kecskeméti TE	5th	Kecskemét	Messzi István Sportcsarnok	1,600	(Montenegro) Stojan Ivković	Kipsta
Körmend	8th	Körmend	Városi Sportcsarnok	2,000	(Hungary) Csaba Déri	Legea
MAFC	1st (NB I/B)	Budapest	Gabányi László Sportcsarnok	1,000	(Sweden) Stefan Timbus	hummel
Nyíregyháza KK	13th	Nyíregyháza	Bujtosi Szabadidő Csarnok	1,451	(Hungary) Ernő Sitku	Made by club
PVSK	7th	Pécs	Lauber Dezső Sportcsarnok	2,791	(Hungary) Ferenc Csirke	Erreà
Sopron KC	3rd	Sopron	MKB Aréna	2,000	(Hungary) Balázs Sabáli	Spalding
SZTE-Szedeák	9th	Szeged	Újszegedi Sportcsarnok	3,200	(Serbia) Nikola Lazić	Toti sport
Szolnoki Olaj	1st	Szolnok	Tiszaligeti Sportcsarnok	2,551	(Serbia) Dragan Aleksić	Spalding
Zalaegerszegi TE	12th	Zalaegerszeg	Városi Sportcsarnok	2,700	(Slovenia) Miloš Šporar	Erreà

Team from ABA League

== Regular season (Alapszakasz) ==
Location of teams in 2014-15 Nemzeti Bajnokság I/A

=== Standings ===
Pos	Team	Pld	W	L	PF	PA	PD	PCT	Qualification
1	Atomerőmű SE	24	20	4	2051	1719	+332	.833	1st – 5th Placement
2	KTE-Duna Aszfalt	24	19	5	1931	1690	+241	.792	1st – 5th Placement
3	Soproni Sördögök	24	17	7	2081	1882	+199	.708	1st – 5th Placement
4	Kaposvári KK	24	15	9	2052	2018	+34	.625	1st – 5th Placement
5	Falco Trend-Optika KC Szombathely	24	15	9	2135	2071	+64	.625	6th – 10th Placement
6	Pécsi VSK-PANNONPOWER	24	13	11	1977	1928	+49	.542	6th – 10th Placement
7	Naturtex-SZTE-Szedeák	24	12	12	2006	2088	−82	.500	6th – 10th Placement
8	TLI-Alba Fehérvár	24	11	13	2057	1966	+91	.458	6th – 10th Placement
9	EGIS Körmend	24	10	14	2062	2020	+42	.417	6th – 10th Placement
10	FAIRUM JKSE	24	8	16	1978	2153	−175	.333	11th – 14th Placement
11	Marso-Nyíregyháza KK	24	8	16	1845	1975	−130	.333	11th – 14th Placement
12	MAFC	24	4	20	1778	2085	−307	.167	11th – 14th Placement
13	Zalakerámia-ZTE KK	24	4	20	1716	2074	−358	.167	11th – 14th Placement

Updated to match(es) played on 8 March 2015. Source: Kosarsport.hu

=== Results ===
Home \ Away	ALBA	ASE	FAL	JKSE	KAP	KTE	KÖR	MAFC	NYKK	PVSK	SOP	SZTE	ZTE
Alba Fehérvár		101–97	102–105	104–85	88–108	72–74	99–82	98–73	81–67	79–84	82–75	103–73	98–71
Atomerőmű SE	74–68		100–74	82–67	93–71	74–59	88–79	91–57	88–69	80–68	89–91	90–51	65–61
Falco KC Szombathely	77–62	81–94		108–81	83–97	73–83	96–88	105–72	96–66	101–69	84–81	122–98	92–80
Jászberényi KSE	88–87	90–86	87–107		112–92	76–79	89–80	84–74	91–69	72–81	80–86	88–103	99–91
Kaposvári KK	91–88	67–84	100–84	96–87		57–74	92–88	92–59	93–80	76–73	106–81	90–77	88–72
Kecskeméti TE	83–77	77–75	83–54	99–57	93–67		80–73	81–66	69–61	80–65	81–90	70–62	90–60
BC Körmend	90–88	81–85	73–85	95–83	69–80	94–72		95–61	100–71	88–91	106–99	97–82	105–64
MAFC	65–79	55–76	87–88	91–87	78–79	61–86	91–101		82–80	72–79	84–77	71–92	94–65
Nyíregyháza KK	80–76	66–77	96–75	91–95	84–68	69–73	73–72	98–92		88–70	70–90	76–93	100–60
PVSK Panthers	98–79	75–76	89–91	97–69	87–91	79–75	101–78	86–73	82–68		71–74	97–81	93–83
Sopron KC	74–85	75–80	102–74	93–59	102–84	95–85	88–73	97–83	101–65	80–64		82–65	90–72
SZTE-Szedeák	78–90	83–106	101–92	88–80	88–78	81–90	93–83	78–73	87–78	103–100	73–84		99–74
ZTE KK	74–71	53–101	80–88	74–72	94–89	52–95	69–72	91–64	64–80	71–78	67–74	74–77	

Legend: Blue = home team win; Yellow = draw; Red = away team win.

== Second round (Középszakasz) ==
=== 1st – 5th Placement (Felsőház) ===
==== Standings ====
Pos	Team	Pld	W	L	PF	PA	PD	Pts	Qualification
1	Szolnoki Olaj KK	8	5	3	614	566	+48	16	Playoffs
2	KTE-Duna Aszfalt	8	5	3	580	568	+12	15	Playoffs
3	Atomerőmű SE	8	3	5	621	634	−13	14	Playoffs
4	Kaposvári KK	8	4	4	713	709	+4	13	Playoffs
5	Soproni Sördögök	8	3	5	582	633	−51	13	Playoffs

Updated to match(es) played on 15 March 2015. Source: Kosarsport.hu

==== Results ====
Home \ Away	ASE	KAP	KTE	SOP	OLAJ
Atomerőmű SE		93–86	60–68	64–68	82–73
Kaposvári KK	97–92		96–81	106–92	99–88
Kecskeméti TE	80–76	90–78		72–47	55–56
Sopron KC	82–87	83–82	71–79		81–76
Szolnoki Olaj KK	80–67	90–69	84–55	67–58	

Legend: Blue = home team win; Yellow = draw; Red = away team win.

=== 6th – 10th Placement (Középház) ===
==== Standings ====
Pos	Team	Pld	W	L	PF	PA	PD	Pts	Qualification
6	Falco Trend-Optika KC Szombathely	32	19	13	2888	2810	+78	51	Playoffs
7	Pécsi VSK-PANNONPOWER	32	17	15	2658	2619	+39	49	Playoffs
8	Naturtex-SZTE-Szedeák	32	16	16	2742	2861	−119	48	Playoffs
9	TLI-Alba Fehérvár	32	15	17	2823	2706	+117	47	
10	EGIS Körmend	32	14	18	2810	2764	+46	46	

Updated to match(es) played on 15 March 2015. Source: Kosarsport.hu

==== Results ====
Home \ Away	ALBA	FAL	KÖR	PVSK	SZTE
Alba Fehérvár		104–86	118–106	90–82	90–93
Falco KC Szombathely	100–96		96–90	97–77	105–84
BC Körmend	96–84	101–90		66–78	113–86
PVSK Panthers	91–86	89–84	83–85		85–103
SZTE-Szedeák	86–98	98–95	106–91	80–96	

Legend: Blue = home team win; Yellow = draw; Red = away team win.

=== 11th – 14th Placement (Alsóház) ===
==== Standings ====
Pos	Team	Pld	W	L	PF	PA	PD	Pts	Qualification
11	FAIRUM JKSE	30	13	17	2469	2640	−171	43	
12	Marso-Nyíregyháza KK	30	11	19	2319	2455	−136	41	
13	Zalakerámia-ZTE KK	30	6	24	2199	2549	−350	36	Play-out
14	MAFC	30	6	24	2238	2551	−313	36	Play-out

Updated to match(es) played on 15 March 2015. Source: Kosarsport.hu

==== Results ====
Home \ Away	JKSE	MAFC	NYKK	ZTE
Jászberényi KSE		83–82	85–80	83–72
MAFC	79–81		79–63	61–81
Nyíregyháza KK	94–78	74–72		100–87
ZTE KK	80–81	84–87	79–63	

Legend: Blue = home team win; Yellow = draw; Red = away team win.

== Playoffs ==
Teams in bold won the playoff series. Numbers to the left of each team indicate the team's original playoff seeding. Numbers to the right indicate the score of each playoff game.

Quarterfinals
1	**Szolnoki Olaj**	**83**	**85**	**79**
8	Naturtex-SZTE-Szedeák	78	73	50
4	Kaposvári	**103**	71	**96**	89	81
5	**Soproni**	69	**80**	82	**96**	**86**
2	**KTE-Duna Aszfalt**	**77**	**82**	**89**
7	Pécsi VSK-PANNONPOWER	67	56	75
3	**Atomerőmű**	**93**	77	**98**	74	**87**
6	Falco Szombathely	69	**95**	65	**89**	82

Semifinals
1	**Szolnoki Olaj**	**87**	**86**	**86**
5	Soproni	54	72	63
2	**KTE-Duna Aszfalt**	**73**	52	**67**	55	**60**
3	Atomerőmű	61	**65**	60	**58**	48

Final
1	**Szolnoki Olaj**	**64**	**79**	**66**
2	KTE-Duna Aszfalt	43	71	55
Third place
3	**Atomerőmű**	**93**	**94**	–	–
5	Soproni	73	84	–	–

=== Final ===
20 May 2015	**Szolnoki Olaj KK**	**64**–43	KTE-Duna Aszfalt	Tiszaligeti Sportcsarnok, Szolnok
18:00	Scoring by quarter: 9–**10**, 15–15, **21**–5, **19**–13
	Pts: Dávid Vojvoda 11; Rebs: three players 7 Asts: Strahinja Milošević 5	Report	Pts: Marko Đerasimović, James Kinney 7 Rebs: Tomislav Ivošev 8 Asts: Martin Pongó 3	Attendance: 1,500; Referees: Földházi T., Benczur T., Farkas G.

23 May 2015	KTE-Duna Aszfalt	71–**79**	**Szolnoki Olaj KK**	Messzi István Sportcsarnok, Kecskemét
18:00	Scoring by quarter: 18–18, **22**–19, 16–**20**, 15–**22**
	Pts: Marko Đerasimović 22; Rebs: Péter Kovács, Tomislav Ivošev 6 Asts: James Kinney 3	Report	Pts: Dávid Vojvoda 24; Rebs: three players6 Asts: Lazeric Jones 3	Attendance: 1,600; Referees: Cziffra Cs., Pálla Z., Györffy P. A.

26 May 2015	**Szolnoki Olaj KK**	**66**–55	KTE-Duna Aszfalt	Tiszaligeti Sportcsarnok, Szolnok
18:00
	Pts: Vojodva 19; Rebs: Milosevic 11; Asts: Rakic 6	Report	Pts: Derasimovic 14; Rebs: Karahodzic 7 Asts: 2 players 6

== Play-out ==
13th placed team hosted Games 1 and, plus Game 3 if necessary. 14th placed team hosted Game 2.

13th placed team	Agg.	14th placed team	1st leg	2nd leg	3rd leg
Zalakerámia-ZTE KK	2–1	MAFC	82–72	85–89	77–61

== Individual statistics ==
=== Points ===
Rank	Name	Team	PPG
1.	(United Kingdom) Ryan Richards	EGIS Körmend	23.28
2.	(Bosnia and Herzegovina) Nermin Hujdurović	Marso NYKK	22.75
3.	(Serbia) Darko Balaban	Naturtex-SZTE-Szedeák	21.1

=== Rebounds ===
Rank	Name	Team	Games	RPG
1.	(United Kingdom) Ryan Richards	EGIS Körmend	18	9.22
2.	(United States) Nathan Healy	Zalakerámia-ZTE KK	9	10.22
3.	(United States) Jarrod Jones	Atomerőmű SE	17	8.88

=== Assists ===
Rank	Name	Team	Games	APG
1.			14	9.0
2.			11	6.54
3.			13	5.3

=== Blocks ===
Rank	Name	Team	Games	BPG
1.	(Hungary) Roland Hendlein	Kaposvári KK	18	1.22
2.	(Serbia) Darko Balaban	Naturtex-SZTE-Szedeák	16	1.06
3.	(United States) Melvin Cleveland	TLI-Alba Fehérvár	10	1

=== Steals ===
Rank	Name	Team	Games	SPG
1.	(United States) Walter Lemon	EGIS Körmend	12	2.67
2.	(Hungary) Dávid Gáspár	Zalakerámia-ZTE KK	13	2.31
3.	(United States) Lasan Kromah	TLI-Alba Fehérvár	18	2.17

== Number of teams by counties ==
	County (megye)	No. teams	Teams
1	Jász-Nagykun-Szolnok	2	Jászberényi KSE and Szolnoki Olaj
1	Vas	2	Falco KC and Körmend
2	Bács-Kiskun	1	Kecskemét
2	Baranya	1	Pécsi VSK
2	Budapest	1	MAFC
2	Csongrád	1	SZTE-Szedeák
2	Fejér	1	Alba Fehérvár
2	Győr-Moson-Sopron	1	Sopron KC
2	Somogy	1	Kaposvári KK
2	Szabolcs-Szatmár-Bereg	1	Nyíregyháza KK
2	Tolna	1	Atomerőmű SE
2	Zala	1	Zalaegerszegi TE
