= 2015–16 Nemzeti Bajnokság I/A (men's basketball) =

NB I/A
- Duration: October 2, 2015 - June 10, 2016
- Teams: 14
- TV partner(s): M4 Sport

Regular season
- Relegated: MARSO Nyíregyháza

Finals
- Champions: Szolnoki Olaj KK (7th title)
- Runners-up: TLI-Alba Fehérvár
- Third place: Egis Körmend
- Fourth place: Atomerőmű SE

Statistical leaders
Points	(United States) Rashad Anderson	24.1
Rebounds	(Hungary) Roland Hendlein	10.8
Assists	(Puerto Rico) Emanuel Ubilla	7.5

The 2015–16 Nemzeti Bajnokság I/A was the 84th season of the Nemzeti Bajnokság I/A, the highest tier professional basketball league in Hungary.

== Teams ==
Location of teams in 2015-16 Nemzeti Bajnokság I/A

The following 14 clubs competed in the NB I/A during the 2015–16 season:

Team	Position 2014-15	City	Arena	Capacity
Alba Fehérvár	9th	Székesfehérvár	Vodafone Sportcentrum	1,963
Atomerőmű SE	Third place	Paks	ASE Sportcsarnok	1,520
Falco KC	6th	Szombathely	Arena Savaria	3,500
Jászberényi KSE	11th	Jászberény	Belvárosi Általános Iskola	1,000
Kaposvári KK	5th	Kaposvár	Városi Sportcsarnok	1,500
Kecskeméti TE	Runner-up	Kecskemét	Messzi István Sportcsarnok	1,600
BC Körmend	10th	Körmend	Városi Sportcsarnok	1,740
MAFC	14th	Budapest	Gabányi László Sportcsarnok	700
Nyíregyháza Blue Sharks	12th	Nyíregyháza	Bem József Ált. Isk.	
PVSK-Panthers	7th	Pécs	Lauber Dezső Sportcsarnok	3,700
Soproni KC	4th	Sopron	NOVOMATIC Aréna	2,500
SZTE-Szedeák	8th	Szeged	Újszegedi Sportcsarnok	3,000
Szolnoki Olaj KK	Champion	Szolnok	Tiszaligeti Sportcsarnok	2,551
Zalaegerszegi TE	13th	Zalaegerszeg	Városi Sportcsarnok	2,000

=== Personnel and kits ===
Team	Head coach	Team captain	Kit manufacturer	Shirt sponsor
Alba Fehérvár	(Serbia) Branislav Džunić	(Hungary) Balázs Simon	Spalding	Hungrana
Atomerőmű SE	(Hungary) Béla Schmidt	(Hungary) Ákos Kovács	adidas	
Falco KC Szombathely	(Hungary) László Kálmán	(Hungary)	Zeus	Trend Optika, Sport36
Jászberényi KSE	(Hungary) Gábor Forray		Spalding	TOP COP
Kaposvári KK	(Serbia) Srećko Sekulović	(Hungary) Roland Hendlein	Spalding	
Kecskeméti TE	(Serbia) Boris Maljković	(Hungary) Gergely Hegedűs	Kipsta	Duna Aszfalt
BC Körmend	(Croatia) Teo Čizmić	(Hungary) Csaba Ferencz	Nike	EGIS
MAFC	(Sweden) Stefan Timbus		Spalding	
Nyíregyháza Blue Sharks	(Hungary) Ernő Sitku		adidas	marso
PVSK-Panthers	(Hungary) Ferenc Csirke	(Croatia) Veljko Budimir	Spalding	Pannonpower, Terra 21
Soproni KC	(Hungary) Balázs Sabáli		Spalding	Dömper Kft.
SZTE-Szedeák	(Serbia) Nikola Lazić	(Hungary) Zsolt Kiss	Toti Sport	Naturex
Szolnoki Olaj	(Hungary) Péter Pór	(Hungary) Dávid Vojvoda	Spalding	Strabag
Zalaegerszeg	(Hungary) Tamás Bencze	(Hungary) Máté Mohácsi	adidas	Zalakerámia, WinDoor

== Regular season (Alapszakasz) ==
Pos	Team	Pld	W	L	PF	PA	PD	Pts	Qualification
1	Szolnoki Olaj KK	26	20	6	2101	1879	+222	46	1st – 5th Placement (Felsőház)
2	Atomerőmű SE	26	20	6	2194	2008	+186	46	1st – 5th Placement (Felsőház)
3	Zalakerámia ZTE KK	26	19	7	2075	1905	+170	45	1st – 5th Placement (Felsőház)
4	TLI-Alba Fehérvár	26	18	8	2365	2040	+325	44	1st – 5th Placement (Felsőház)
5	Egis Körmend	26	18	8	2184	1995	+189	44	1st – 5th Placement (Felsőház)
6	Sopron KC	26	16	10	2120	1990	+130	42	6th – 10th Placement (Középház)
7	Falco-Trend Optika KC Szombathely	26	13	13	2070	2078	−8	39	6th – 10th Placement (Középház)
8	Kaposvári KK	26	12	14	2137	2161	−24	38	6th – 10th Placement (Középház)
9	PVSK-PANNONPOWER	26	10	16	1970	2105	−135	36	6th – 10th Placement (Középház)
10	KTE-Duna Aszfalt	26	10	16	1929	2049	−120	36	6th – 10th Placement (Középház)
11	Naturtex-SZTE-Szedeák	26	8	18	2005	2175	−170	34	11th – 14th Placement (Alsóház)
12	MAFC	26	8	18	2108	2339	−231	34	11th – 14th Placement (Alsóház)
13	MARSO Nyíregyháza	26	5	21	1984	2266	−282	31	11th – 14th Placement (Alsóház)
14	JP-TOP COP Jászberény	26	5	21	2058	2310	−252	31	11th – 14th Placement (Alsóház)

Updated to match(es) played on 19 March 2016. Source: Kosarsport.hu
Rules for classification: 1) Points; 2) Goal difference; 3) Goals scored.

=== Results ===
Home \ Away	ALBA	ASE	FAL	JKSE	KAP	KTE	KÖR	MAFC	NYKK	PVSK	SOP	SZTE	SZOL	ZTE
Alba Fehérvár		108–103	120–84	110–89	94–74	93–69	88–72	93–49	101–69	91–72	91–71	107–74	70–81	89–91
Atomerőmű SE	96–81		83–62	85–72	91–48	77–72	98–71	112–76	86–70	98–92	72–69	69–63	118–107	88–80
Falco KC Szombathely	73–71	81–61		100–76	70–66	77–57	73–69	86–63	94–74	86–62	79–75	77–86	65–73	78–64
Jászberényi KSE	77–101	80–92	99–91		85–76	96–88	80–84	75–89	87–95	87–91	79–100	86–77	81–92	80–84
Kaposvári KK	88–83	102–107	103–98	95–80		78–64	86–101	90–67	87–76	81–78	112–93	81–84	82–86	90–74
Kecskeméti TE	63–94	79–68	83–79	83–73	71–70		86–74	98–101	81–72	64–75	83–72	81–75	78–86	70–75
BC Körmend	77–76	63–66	100–64	77–68	91–81	93–57		91–97	103–69	77–60	108–102	91–65	89–78	76–81
MAFC	84–108	70–77	89–90	96–91	86–90	71–93	85–90		123–121	87–71	59–88	90–69	69–75	82–85
Nyíregyházi KK	87–97	92–69	82–90	69–74	68–84	61–76	84–90	95–91		84–78	68–71	75–70	68–86	71–81
PVSK Panthers	86–88	74–85	83–82	94–73	57–88	72–63	71–84	88–62	82–66		85–94	83–74	57–92	81–62
Sopron KC	79–80	71–76	82–81	87–71	97–82	70–58	61–80	91–87	82–61	90–68		67–51	88–76	79–77
SZTE-Szedeák	87–99	71–90	105–96	91–67	96–81	77–73	69–83	95–74	97–87	78–93	60–102		97–101	65–76
Szolnoki Olaj KK	68–64	71–58	68–65	81–62	76–52	84–70	62–75	90–69	95–53	89–46	88–73	70–63		72–83
Zalaegerszegi TE	75–68	83–69	84–49	82–70	88–68	86–69	88–75	87–92	91–67	80–71	58–66	76–66	84–54	

Legend: Blue = home team win; Yellow = draw; Red = away team win.

== Second round (Középszakasz) ==
=== 1st – 5th Placement (Felsőház) ===
Pos	Team	Pld	W	L	PF	PA	PD	Pts	Qualification
1	Szolnoki Olaj KK	34	25	9	2738	2473	+265	59	Playoffs
2	TLI-Alba Fehérvár	34	23	11	3061	2676	+385	57	Playoffs
3	Atomerőmű SE	34	23	11	2829	2673	+156	57	Playoffs
4	Egis Körmend	34	22	12	2812	2640	+172	56	Playoffs
5	Zalakerámia ZTE KK	34	22	12	2695	2581	+114	56	Playoffs

Updated to match(es) played on 28 April 2016. Source: Kosarsport.hu
Rules for classification: 1) Points;

==== Results ====
Home \ Away	ALBA	ASE	KÖR	SZOL	ZTE
Alba Fehérvár		97–74	88–78	78–76	94–66
Atomerőmű SE	84–73		73–81	92–78	109–69
BC Körmend	74–92	95–77		80–77	67–70
Szolnoki Olaj KK	88–86	82–61	83–53		77–72
Zalaegerszegi TE	96–88	90–65	85–100	72–76	

Legend: Blue = home team win; Yellow = draw; Red = away team win.

=== 6th – 10th Placement (Középház) ===
Pos	Team	Pld	W	L	PF	PA	PD	Pts	Qualification
6	Sopron KC	34	21	13	2744	2578	+166	55	Playoffs
7	Kaposvári KK	34	16	18	2802	2807	−5	50	Playoffs
8	PVSK-PANNONPOWER	34	15	19	2543	2690	−147	49	Playoffs
9	Falco-Trend Optika KC Szombathely	34	15	19	2656	2725	−69	49	
10	KTE-Duna Aszfalt	34	14	20	2522	2624	−102	48	

Updated to match(es) played on 28 April 2016. Source: Kosarsport.hu
Rules for classification: 1) Points;

==== Results ====
Home \ Away	FAL	KAP	KTE	PVSK	SOP
Falco KC Szombathely		82–91	76–74	68–72	80–75
Kaposvári KK	94–74		80–76	73–84	86–92
Kecskeméti TE	67–63	91–82		75–61	65–74
PVSK Panthers	89–78	57–82	72–68		85–66
Sopron KC	85–65	90–77	67–77	75–53	

Legend: Blue = home team win; Yellow = draw; Red = away team win.

=== 11th – 14th Placement (Alsóház) ===
Pos	Team	Pld	W	L	PF	PA	PD	Pts	Qualification
11	Naturtex-SZTE-Szedeák	32	12	20	2522	2698	−176	44	
12	JP-TOP COP Jászberény	32	10	22	2628	2825	−197	42	
13	MAFC	32	10	22	2628	2876	−248	42	Play-out
14	MARSO Nyíregyháza	32	6	26	2485	2799	−314	38	Play-out

Updated to match(es) played on 28 April 2016. Source: Kosarsport.hu
Rules for classification: 1) Points;

==== Results ====
Home \ Away	JKSE	MAFC	NYKK	SZTE
Jászberényi KSE		118–92	101–100	74–53
MAFC	80–87		91–64	83–76
Nyíregyházi KK	80–86	91–78		90–92
SZTE-Szedeák	110–104	101–96	85–76	

Legend: Blue = home team win; Yellow = draw; Red = away team win.

== Playoffs ==
Teams in bold won the playoff series. Numbers to the left of each team indicate the team's original playoff seeding. Numbers to the right indicate the score of each playoff game.

Quarterfinals
1	**Szolnoki Olaj**	**74**	**72**	**75**
8	PVSK-PANNONPOWER	70	66	57
4	**Egis Körmend**	**88**	68	**92**	**73**
5	Zalakerámia ZTE KK	78	**71**	69	70
2	**TLI-Alba Fehérvár**	**98**	**87**	**103**
7	Kaposvári KK	95	84	57
3	**Atomerőmű SE**	**95**	59	**72**	61	**73**
6	Sopron KC	70	**89**	69	**72**	70

Semifinals
1	**Szolnoki Olaj**	77	**80**	**93**	53	**77**
4	Egis Körmend	**86**	73	88	**89**	69
2	**TLI-Alba Fehérvár**	**99**	76	**96**	**69**
3	Atomerőmű SE	77	**80**	68	64

Finals
1	**Szolnoki Olaj**	**86**	66	**91**	**78**
2	TLI-Alba Fehérvár	80	**91**	85	76
Third place
3	Atomerőmű SE	**93**	76	75	–	–
4	**Egis Körmend**	81	**102**	**86**	–	–

=== Finals ===
In the finals, teams play against each other which must win three games to win the title. Thus, if one team win three games before all five games have been played, the remaining games are omitted. The team that finished in the higher Regular season place will be played the first, the third and the fifth (if it is necessary) game of the series at home.

Team 1	Agg.	Team 2	Game 1	Game 2	Game 3	Game 4	Game 5
**Szolnoki Olaj KK**	3–1	TLI-Alba Fehérvár	86–80	66–91	91–85	78–76	—

==== Game 1 ====
1 June 2016	**Szolnoki Olaj**	**86**–80	TLI-Alba Fehérvár	Szolnok
18:00 (CEST)	Scoring by quarter: **22**–16, **22**–21, 20–**23**, **22**–20
	Pts: D. Vojvoda 23; Rebs: M. Borisov 9 Asts: 9 PIR: S. Milošević 33	Report	Pts: P. Lóránt 20; Rebs: T. Spurlock 8 Asts: 8 PIR: B. Simon 27	Arena: Tiszaligeti Sportcsarnok; Attendance: 1,600; Referees: Tamás Földházi, Péter Papp, Péter Frányó

==== Game 2 ====
4 June 2016	**TLI-Alba Fehérvár**	**91**–66	Szolnoki Olaj	Székesfehérvár
15:15 (CEST)	Scoring by quarter: **27**–12, **25**–14, 20–**21**, 19–19
	Pts: R. Pearson 18; Rebs: L. Marković 9 Asts: 6 PIR: R. Pearson 21	Report	Pts: J. Jones 16; Rebs: J. Jones 8 Asts: 5 PIR: J. Jones 19	Arena: Alba Regia Sportcsarnok; Attendance: 2,500; Referees: Tamás Benczur, Pál Attila Györffy, Tibor Hegedüs

==== Game 3 ====
7 June 2016	**Szolnoki Olaj**	**91**–85	TLI-Alba Fehérvár	Szolnok
18:00 (CEST)	Scoring by quarter: **25**–17, 21–21, 26–**28**, 19–19
	Pts: D. Vojvoda 23; Rebs: J. Jones, M. Borisov 7 Asts: 7 PIR: D. Vojvoda 31	Report	Pts: P. Lóránt 30; Rebs: R. Pearson 9 Asts: 8 PIR: P. Lóránt 39	Arena: Tiszaligeti Sportcsarnok; Attendance: 1,700; Referees: Gellért Kapitány, Gábor Farkas, Tamás Söjtöry

==== Game 4 ====
10 June 2016	TLI-Alba Fehérvár	76–**78**	**Szolnoki Olaj**	Székesfehérvár
17:00 (CEST)	Scoring by quarter: 15–**23**, 22–**26**, **20**–17, **19**–12
	Pts: P. Lóránt 16; Rebs: T. Spurlock 9 Asts: 6 PIR: T. Spurlock 22	Report	Pts: D. Vojvoda, M. Borisov 20; Rebs: M. Borisov 10; Asts: 5 PIR: M. Borisov 29	Arena: Alba Regia Sportcsarnok; Attendance: 2,600; Referees: Csaba Cziffra, Péter Papp, Tamás Söjtöry

Szolnoki Olaj KK won the FINAL series 3–1.

2015–16 NB I/A
Winner
**Szolnoki Olaj**
**7th title**

6 Ákos Keller, 8 Krisztián Wittmann, 9 Dávid Vojvoda (c), 10 Péter Kovács, 11 Goran Vrbanc, 12 Gergely Somogyi, 15 Miloš Borisov, 18 Balázs Peringer, 21 Jarrod Jones, 22 Péter Zsíros, 24 Strahinja Milošević, 32 Gábor Kovács, 33 Dino Gregory, Gábor Rudner
Head coach: Stojan Ivković

== Play-out ==
13th placed team hosted Games 1, plus Game 3 if necessary. 14th placed team hosted Game 2.

13th placed team	Agg.	14th placed team	Game 1	Game 2	Game 3
MAFC	2–1	MARSO Nyíregyháza	87–85	89–99	98–81

== Season statistics ==
=== Number of teams by counties ===
Pos.	County (megye)		No. of teams	Teams
1		Jász-Nagykun-Szolnok	2	Jászberényi KSE and Szolnoki Olaj
1		Vas	2	Falco KC and Körmend
3		Bács-Kiskun	1	Kecskemét
3		Baranya	1	Pécsi VSK
3		Budapest	1	MAFC
3		Csongrád	1	SZTE-Szedeák
3		Fejér	1	Alba Fehérvár
3		Győr-Moson-Sopron	1	Sopron KC
3		Somogy	1	Kaposvári KK
3	align=center	Szabolcs-Szatmár-Bereg	1	Nyíregyháza KK
3		Tolna	1	Atomerőmű SE
3		Zala	1	Zalaegerszegi TE

== Hungarian clubs in European competitions ==
Eurocup

- Szolnoki Olaj

Round	Club	Home	Away	Aggregate
Regular Season (Group E)	(Turkey) Beşiktaş Sompo Japan	85-67	67-76	4th
Regular Season (Group E)	(Lithuania) Lietuvos rytas	65-89	99-98	4th
Regular Season (Group E)	(Russia) Zenit Saint Petersburg	75-84	64-89	4th
Regular Season (Group E)	(Russia) Avtodor Saratov	83-79	78-104	4th
Regular Season (Group E)	(Greece) PAOK	78-69	69-72	4th
Last 32 (Group N)	(Italy) Dinamo Sassari	86-75	74-90	4th
Last 32 (Group N)	(Turkey) Galatasaray Odeabank	54-74	59-87	4th
Last 32 (Group N)	(Spain) CAI Zaragoza	70-80	60-88	4th

FIBA Europe Cup

- Sopron

Round	Club	Home	Away	Aggregate
Regular Season (Group B)	(Croatia) Cibona	91-72	63-77	4th
Regular Season (Group B)	(Belgium) Antwerp Giants	55-81	73-81	4th
Regular Season (Group B)	(Portugal) Benfica	65-78	62-91	4th

- Falco KC

Round	Club	Home	Away	Aggregate
Regular Season (Group C)	(Belgium) Telenet Oostende	64-86	62-91	4th
Regular Season (Group C)	(Sweden) Södertälje Kings	81-85	62-54	4th
Regular Season (Group C)	(Italy) OpenjobMetis Varese	75-73	71-94	4th

- Körmend

Round	Club	Home	Away	Aggregate
Regular Season (Group A)	(France) ASVEL	86-97	64-83	4th
Regular Season (Group A)	(Belgium) Belfius Mons-Hainaut	77-66	70-103	4th
Regular Season (Group A)	(Netherlands) Donar Groningen	71-78	75-72	4th

== Final standings ==
Pos	Team	Qualification or relegation
1st place, gold medalist(s)	Szolnoki Olaj	Qualification for the Champions League Regular season
2nd place, silver medalist(s)	TLI-Alba Fehérvár	Qualification for the Europe Cup Regular season
3rd place, bronze medalist(s)	Egis Körmend	Qualification for the Europe Cup Regular season
4	Atomerőmű SE	not participate in European competition
5	Zalakerámia ZTE KK	not participate in European competition
6	Sopron KC	Qualification for the Europe Cup Regular season
7	Kaposvári KK	
8	PVSK-PANNONPOWER	
9	Falco-Trend Optika KC Szombathely	
10	KTE-Duna Aszfalt	
11	Naturtex-SZTE-Szedeák	
12	JP-TOP COP Jászberény	
13	MAFC	Relegation to the Greek A2 Basketball League
14	MARSO Nyíregyháza	Relegation to the Greek A2 Basketball League
