= 2017–18 Nemzeti Bajnokság I/A (men's basketball) =

Nemzeti Bajnokság I/A
- Season: 2017–18
- Dates: 7 October 2017 - 18 June 2018
- Games played: 182 (regular season)
- Teams: 14
- TV partner: M4 Sport

Regular season
- Relegated: MAFC

Finals
- Champions: Szolnoki Olaj KK (8th title)
- Runners-up: Falco-Vulcano KC Szombathely
- Semifinalists: Alba Fehérvár; EGIS Körmend

The 2017–18 Nemzeti Bajnokság I/A (transl. National Championship I/A) is the 87th season of the Nemzeti Bajnokság I/A, the highest professional basketball league in Hungary. Alba Fehérvár is the defending champion.

== Teams ==
Location of teams in 2017–18 Nemzeti Bajnokság I/A

DEAC was promoted to this season as champions from the Hungarian 2016–17 NB I/B. Vasas SC left the league.

=== Arenas and locations ===
Team	Position 2016–17	City	Arena	Capacity
Alba Fehérvár	Champion	Székesfehérvár	Vodafone Sportcentrum	1,963
Atomerőmű SE	11th	Paks	ASE Sportcsarnok	1,520
Debreceni EAC	1st (NB I/B)	Debrecen	Oláh Gábor Sports Hall	1,200
Falco KC	Runner-up	Szombathely	Arena Savaria	3,500
Jászberényi KSE	12th	Jászberény	Belvárosi Általános Iskola	1,000
Kaposvári KK	7th	Kaposvár	Városi Sportcsarnok	1,270
Kcskeméti TE	8th	Kecskemét	Messzi István Sportcsarnok	1,600
BC Körmend	4th	Körmend	Városi Sportcsarnok	2,020
MAFC	14th	Budapest	Gabányi László Sportcsarnok	1,000
PVSK Panthers	6th	Pécs	Lauber Dezső Sportcsarnok	2,191
Soproni KC	10th	Sopron	NOVOMATIC Aréna	2,500
Szolnoki Olaj KK	5th	Szolnok	Tiszaligeti Sportcsarnok	2,122
SZTE-Szedeák	9th	Szeged	Újszegedi Sportcsarnok	3,000
Zalaegerszegi TE	Third place	Zalaegerszeg	Városi Sportcsarnok	2,816

=== Personnel and kits ===
Team	Head coach	Team captain	Kit manufacturer	Shirt sponsor
Alba Fehérvár	(Serbia) Branislav Džunić	(Hungary) Péter Lóránt	Spalding	tippmi^{1}, Hungrana, Huawei
Atomerőmű SE	(Croatia) Teo Čizmić	(Hungary) Máté Medve	adidas	tippmix^{1}, MVM Atomerőmű
Debreceni EAC	(Hungary) Sándor Berényi		adidas	tippmix^{1}
Falco KC Szombathely	(Serbia) Srećko Sekulović	(Hungary) Norbert Tóth	Zeus	tippmix^{1}, Vulcano energia, Autófókusz
Jászberényi KSE	(Serbia) Nikola Lazić	(Hungary) György Cseh	Spalding	tippmix^{1}, Mercedes-Benz, Jász-Plasztik
Kaposvári KK	(Hungary) Ádám Fekete	(Hungary) Roland Hendlein	Spalding	tippmix^{1}, SEAT
Kecskeméti TE	(Hungary) Gábor Forray	(Hungary) Gergely Hegedűs	Kipsta	UltraTech, Duna Aszfalt, tippmix^{1}
BC Körmend	(Slovenia) Gasper Potocnik	(Hungary) Csaba Ferencz	Spalding	tippmix^{1}, EGIS
MAFC	(Serbia) Jovica Arsić	(Hungary)	Spalding	tippmix^{1}
PVSK-Panthers	(Hungary) Ferenc Csirke	(Croatia) Veljko Budimir		tippmix^{1}, Veolia, GP Consulting, Terra21
Soproni KC	(Hungary) Kornél Váradi		Peak	tippmix^{1}
SZTE-Szedeák	(Serbia) Anđelko Mandić	(Serbia) Andrija Ćirić	Toti Sport	tippmix^{1}, Naturtex, Continental
Szolnoki Olaj	(Serbia) Dragan Aleksić	(Hungary) Dávid Vojvoda	Nike	MOL
Zalaegerszeg	(Hungary) Tamás Bencze	(Hungary) Máté Mohácsi	adidas	Zalakerámia, tippmix^{1}, HunGast

== Regular season ==
Pos	Team	Pld	W	L	PF	PA	PD	Pts	Qualification
1	Szolnoki Olaj	26	21	5	2191	1945	+246	47	Qualification for 1st–5th placement matches
2	Falco-Vulcano Szombathely	26	19	7	2337	2097	+240	45	Qualification for 1st–5th placement matches
3	Alba Fehérvár	26	18	8	2106	1941	+165	44	Qualification for 1st–5th placement matches
4	Egis Körmend	26	18	8	2128	2037	+91	44	Qualification for 1st–5th placement matches
5	KTE-Duna Aszfalt	26	15	11	2038	1989	+49	41	Qualification for 1st–5th placement matches
6	Zalakerámia ZTE	26	13	13	2115	2106	+9	39	Qualification for 6th–10th placement matches
7	Atomerőmű	26	13	13	2065	2075	−10	39	Qualification for 6th–10th placement matches
8	Pécsi VSK-VEOLIA	26	13	13	2073	2088	−15	39	Qualification for 6th–10th placement matches
9	Kaposvár	26	12	14	2067	2108	−41	38	Qualification for 6th–10th placement matches
10	Naturtex-SZTE-Szedeák	26	11	15	1996	1997	−1	37	Qualification for 6th–10th placement matches
11	JP Auto-JKSE	26	9	17	1936	2070	−134	35	Qualification for 11th–14th placement matches
12	DEAC	26	8	18	2037	2223	−186	34	Qualification for 11th–14th placement matches
13	Sopron	26	6	20	1990	2173	−183	32	Qualification for 11th–14th placement matches
14	MAFC	26	6	20	1916	2146	−230	32	Qualification for 11th–14th placement matches

Updated to match(es) played on 8 May 2018. Source: Kosarsport.hu
Rules for classification: 1) Games played; 2) Points; 3) Wins; 4) Defeats; 5) Points for; 6) Points against; 7) Victories/Defeats series; 8) in Home games; 9) as a Guest; 10) Last 5 matches.

=== Results ===
Home \ Away	ALBA	ASE	DEAC	FAL	JKSE	KAP	KTE	KÖR	MAFC	PVSK	SOP	SZOL	SZTE	ZTE
Alba Fehérvár		89–82	91–72	89–85	68–55	73–64	75–79	115–75	98–86	92–71	96–72	60–70	94–68	98–86
Atomerőmű SE	60–67		99–75	84–68	66–74	97–67	78–96	92–73	74–65	84–69	95–74	57–90	76–78	79–95
Debreceni EAC	65–83	87–69		62–92	73–62	83–89	79–84	70–110	71–87	83–73	89–96	81–87	66–78	83–71
Falco KC Szombathely	94–66	100–69	95–86		85–65	106–82	99–75	83–79	96–61	80–61	114–109	95–77	96–81	88–82
JP Auto-JKSE	82–72	70–88	98–94	71–90		89–76	97–80	71–85	77–66	81–72	108–92	70–74	78–94	73–82
Kaposvári KK	78–64	74–72	69–75	104–105	76–67		64–66	86–78	106–82	77–79	85–79	97–89	76–60	80–91
KTE-Duna Aszfalt	75–89	64–70	79–70	92–81	68–73	82–68		93–77	83–77	72–73	72–76	67–79	62–58	85–75
Egis Körmend	79–67	91–94	100–93	91–76	77–61	94–77	91–85		69–67	87–74	96–57	76–74	77–72	81–69
MAFC	54–79	89–78	70–75	78–88	73–72	81–91	81–90	62–73		95–65	66–74	77–88	73–61	72–96
PVSK-PANNONPOWER	79–47	84–86	81–88	110–106	87–78	96–92	84–93	89–77	93–69		84–57	72–91	75–67	88–89
Sopron KC	77–80	87–99	80–86	65–83	80–68	74–79	66–76	85–60	69–70	60–76		74–78	86–63	84–91
Szolnoki Olaj KK	88–89	91–86	97–68	84–74	85–58	76–65	79–67	74–75	102–73	78–69	86–64		85–70	93–89
Naturtex-SZTE-Szedeák	63–85	86–54	84–75	98–77	85–70	72–73	70–62	79–80	108–85	81–88	77–67	87–88		87–68
Zalakerámia ZTE KK	82–80	72–77	99–88	76–81	82–68	78–72	60–91	72–77	70–57	78–81	96–86	85–88	81–69	

Legend: Blue = home team win; Yellow = draw; Red = away team win.

== Second round ==
=== 1st – 5th placement matches ===
Pos	Team	Pld	W	L	PF	PA	PD	Pts	Qualification
1	Szolnoki Olaj	34	27	7	2850	2570	+280	61	Advance to playoffs
2	Falco-Vulcano Szombathely	34	24	10	3033	2745	+288	58	Advance to playoffs
3	Alba Fehérvár	34	23	11	2749	2529	+220	57	Advance to playoffs
4	Egis Körmend	34	20	14	2740	2704	+36	54	Advance to playoffs
5	KTE-Duna Aszfalt	34	17	17	2631	2664	−33	51	Advance to playoffs

Updated to match(es) played on 2 May 2018. Source: Kosarsport.hu
Rules for classification: 1) Games played; 2) Points; 3) Wins; 4) Defeats; 5) Points for; 6) Points against; 7) Victories/Defeats series; 8) in Home games; 9) as a Guest; 10) Last 5 matches.

==== Results ====
Home \ Away	ALBA	FAL	KTE	KÖR	SZOL
Alba Fehérvár		71–70	85–60	88–69	84–67
Falco KC Szombathely	82–72		87–74	89–75	85–86
KTE-Duna Aszfalt	67–77	93–88		89–80	66–86
Egis Körmend	92–87	78–95	84–67		74–85
Szolnoki Olaj KK	81–79	99–100	88–77	67–60	

Legend: Blue = home team win; Yellow = draw; Red = away team win.

=== 6th – 10th placement matches ===
Pos	Team	Pld	W	L	PF	PA	PD	Pts	Qualification
6	Pécsi VSK-VEOLIA	34	19	15	2746	2760	−14	53	Advance to playoffs
7	Zalakerámia ZTE	34	18	16	2827	2768	+59	52	Advance to playoffs
8	Atomerőmű	34	17	17	2715	2722	−7	51	Advance to playoffs
9	Kaposvár	34	16	18	2728	2755	−27	50	
10	Naturtex-SZTE-Szedeák	34	12	22	2583	2652	−69	46	

Updated to match(es) played on 2 May 2018. Source: Kosarsport.hu
Rules for classification: 1) Games played; 2) Points; 3) Wins; 4) Defeats; 5) Points for; 6) Points against; 7) Victories/Defeats series; 8) in Home games; 9) as a Guest; 10) Last 5 matches.

==== Results ====
Home \ Away	ASE	KAP	PVSK	SZTE	ZTE
Atomerőmű SE		82–73	84–91	68–59	85–79
Kaposvári KK	81–70		94–78	73–78	94–92
PVSK-PANNONPOWER	76–75	94–91		97–87	106–95
Naturtex-SZTE-Szedeák	82–96	65–78	80–57		81–83
Zalakerámia ZTE KK	106–90	88–77	87–74	82–55	

Legend: Blue = home team win; Yellow = draw; Red = away team win.

=== 11th – 14th placement matches ===
Pos	Team	Pld	W	L	PF	PA	PD	Pts	Qualification
11	DEAC	32	12	20	2569	2703	−134	44	
12	JP Auto-JKSE	32	12	20	2457	2588	−131	44	
13	Sopron	32	9	23	2481	2691	−210	41	Qualification for play-out
14	MAFC	32	8	24	2399	2657	−258	40	Qualification for play-out

Source: Kosarsport.hu
Rules for classification: 1) Games played; 2) Points; 3) Wins; 4) Defeats; 5) Points for; 6) Points against; 7) Victories/Defeats series; 8) in Home games; 9) as a Guest; 10) Last 5 matches.

==== Results ====
Home \ Away	DEAC	JKSE	MAFC	SOP
DEAC		98–92	103–81	90–72
JP Auto-JKSE	84–81		84–94	90–83
MAFC	60–76	85–80		81–85
Sopron KC	91–84	77–91	83–82	

Legend: Blue = home team win; Yellow = draw; Red = away team win.

== Playoffs ==
Teams in bold won the playoff series. Numbers to the left of each team indicate the team's original playoff seeding. Numbers to the right indicate the score of each playoff game.

Quarter-finals
1	**Szolnoki Olaj**	**3**
8	Atomerőmű	0
4	**Egis Körmend**	**3**
5	KTE-Duna Aszfalt	2
2	**Falco-Vulcano Szombathely**	**3**
7	Zalakerámia ZTE	1
3	**Alba Fehérvár**	**3**
6	Pécsi VSK-VEOLIA	0

Semi-finals
1	**Szolnoki Olaj**	**3**
4	Egis Körmend	0
2	**Falco-Vulcano Szombathely**	**3**
3	Alba Fehérvár	2

Finals
1	**Szolnoki Olaj**	**3**
2	Falco-Vulcano Szombathely	1
Third place
3	**Alba Fehérvár**	**2**
4	Egis Körmend	0

=== Quarter-finals ===
In the quarterfinals, teams playing against each other had to win three games to win the series. Thus, if one team wins three games before all five games have been played, the games that remain are omitted. The team that finished in the higher regular season place, played the first, third and the fifth (if it was necessary) games of the series at home.

Team 1	Series	Team 2	Game 1	Game 2	Game 3	Game 4	Game 5
**Szolnoki Olaj**	3–0	Atomerőmű	92–60	96–82	82–56	–	–
**Falco-Vulcano Szombathely**	3–1	Zalakerámia ZTE	91–88	104–107	93–70	95–91	–
**Alba Fehérvár**	3–0	PVSK-PANNONPOWER	104–74	82–79	77–58	–	–
**Egis Körmend**	3–2	KTE-Duna Aszfalt	77–59	78–93	104–68	72–91	70–63

=== Semi-finals ===
In the semifinals, teams playing against each other had to win three games to win the series. Thus, if one team wins three games before all five games have been played, the games that remain are omitted. The team that finished in the higher regular season place, played the first, third and the fifth (if it was necessary) games of the series at home.

Team 1	Series	Team 2	Game 1	Game 2	Game 3	Game 4	Game 5
**Szolnoki Olaj**	3–0	Egis Körmend	92–72	80–77	102–59	–	–
**Falco-Vulcano Szombathely**	3–2	Alba Fehérvár	90–88	90–94	86–82	81–112	76–69

=== Finals ===
In the finals, teams playing against each other had to win three games to win the title. Thus, if one team won three games before all five games were played, the remaining games were omitted. The team that finished in the higher regular season place, played the first, the third, and the fifth (if it was necessary) games of the series at home.

Team 1	Series	Team 2	Game 1	Game 2	Game 3	Game 4	Game 5
**Szolnoki Olaj**	3–1	Falco-Vulcano Szombathely	82–76	73–76	89–70	83–81	–

==== Game 1 ====
10 June 2018	**Szolnoki Olaj**	**82**–76 (Series: **1–0**)	Falco-Vulcano Szombathely	Szolnok
17:30 (CEST)	Scoring by quarter: **20**–13, 20–**25**, **20**–15, 22–**23**
	Pts: Andrić 17; Rebs: Ford 12; PIR: Andrić 29	Report	Pts: Perl 21; Rebs: Taylor 12; PIR: Perl 26	Arena: Tiszaligeti Sportcsarnok; Attendance: 2,054; Referees: P. Papp, T. Benczur, D. Tőzsér, (F. Pázsitka)

==== Game 2 ====
12 June 2018	**Falco-Vulcano Szombathely**	**76**–73 (Series: **1–1**)	Szolnoki Olaj	Szombathely
19:00 (CEST)	Scoring by quarter: **26**–21, 13–**20**, 21–**26**, **16**–6
	Pts: Váradi 15; Rebs: Váradi 8 PIR: Váradi 21	Report	Pts: Perry 23; Rebs: Ford 12; PIR: Perry 30	Arena: Arena Savaria; Attendance: 3,020; Referees: G. Kapitány, P. Praksch, R. Török, (J. Szabadvári)

==== Game 3 ====
14 June 2018	**Szolnoki Olaj**	**89**–70 (Series: **2–1**)	Falco-Vulcano Szombathely	Szolnok
20:00 (CEST)	Scoring by quarter: **22**–11, 21–**22**, **28**–15, 18–**22**
	Pts: Perry, Milošević 18; Rebs: Ford 10; PIR: Perry 25	Report	Pts: Perl 19; Rebs: Borisov 7 PIR: Perl 27	Arena: Tiszaligeti Sportcsarnok; Attendance: 2,200; Referees: Cs. Cziffra, P. Győrffy, P. Frányó, (I. Bodrogváry)

==== Game 4 ====
18 June 2018	Falco-Vulcano Szombathely	81–**83** (Series: **3–1**)	**Szolnoki Olaj**	Szombathely
18:00 (CEST)	Scoring by quarter: **26**–21, 19–19, 16–**20**, 20–**23**
	Pts: Govens 26; Rebs: Perl, Taylor 10; PIR: Govens 34	Report	Pts: Perry 20; Rebs: Vojvoda, Milošević 7 PIR: Milošević 20	Arena: Arena Savaria; Attendance: 3,000; Referees: P. Papp, T. Benczur, D. Tőzsér, (M. Faidt)

=== Third place ===
In the series for the third place, teams playing against each other had to win two games to win the 3rd place in the final rankings of the season. Thus, if one team won two games before all three games had been played, the remaining games were omitted. The team that finished in the higher regular season place, played the first and the third (if it was necessary) games of the series at home.

Team 1	Series	Team 2	Game 1	Game 2	Game 3
**Alba Fehérvár**	2–0	Egis Körmend	91–71	95–83	

== Playout ==
Higher ranked team hosted Game 1 plus Game 3 if necessary. The lower ranked hosted Game 2.

Team 1	Series	Team 2	Game 1	Game 2	Game 3
Sopron	2–0	MAFC	90–74	95–92	–

== In European competitions ==
Club	Competition	Progress	Ref
Alba Fehérvár	Champions League	Second qualifying round	
Falco Szombathely	FIBA Europe Cup	Second qualifying round	
EGIS Körmend	FIBA Europe Cup	First qualifying round	
Szolnoki Olaj	FIBA Europe Cup	First qualifying round	

== All-star game ==
The all-star game was played on 2 December 2017 and was played at the Tüskecsarnok in Budapest.

2 December 2017
17:00 (CET)

Team East	133–117	Team West

Tüskecsarnok, Budapest
Attendance: 2,000

Team East	Team West

Pos	Player	Team
Starters
PG	(United States) Kendrick Perry	Szolnoki Olaj KK
SG	(Hungary) Dávid Vojvoda	Szolnoki Olaj KK
SF	(Bulgaria) Ivan Lilov	DEAC
PF	(Hungary) Levente Juhos	Naturtex-SZTE-Szedeák
C	(Hungary) János Eilingsfeld	Atomerőmű SE
Reserves
SG	(Serbia) Marko Boltić	Naturtex-SZTE-Szedeák
	(United States) Allen Seth	Atomerőmű SE
	(United States) James Bernard Thompson	KTE-Duna Aszfalt
	(United States) Devante Wallace	JP Auto - JKSE
F	(United States) Quincy Ford	Szolnoki Olaj KK
C	(The Bahamas) Benett Davis	MAFC
C	(United States) Isaiah Armwood	DEAC
Head coach: (Serbia) Dragan Aleksić (Szolnoki Olaj KK)

Pos	Player	Team
Starters
PG	(United States) Darrin Govens	Falco KC Szombathely
SG	(Hungary) Zoltán Perl	Falco KC Szombathely
SF	(Hungary) Szilárd Benke	Zalakerámia ZTE KK
PF	(Hungary) Péter Lóránt	Alba Fehérvár
C	(Hungary) Ákos Keller	Alba Fehérvár
Reserves
	(United States) Marquis Wright	Egis Körmend
	(United States) Jabril Durham	PVSK-VEOLIA
	(United States) Chris Dunn	Kaposvári KK
G	(Hungary) Benedek Váradi	Falco KC Szombathely
SG	(Hungary) Csaba Ferencz	Egis Körmend
	(United States) Justin Tuoyo	Egis Körmend
C	(United States) Ryan Watkins	Soproni KC
Head coach: (Slovenia) Gašper Potočnik (Egis Körmend)

== See also ==
- 2018 Magyar Kupa
