= ZTE KK =

Zalakerámia ZTE KK
- Leagues: Nemzeti Bajnokság I/A
- Founded: 1979; 47 years ago
- History: ZTE KK (1979–present)
- Arena: Városi Sportcsarnok
- Capacity: 4,000
- Location: Zalaegerszeg, Hungary
- Team colors: Blue, White
- Team manager: Starics Kornél
- Head coach: Kostas Mexas
- Website: https://www.ztekosar.hu
Home	Away

Zalaegerszegi Torna Egylet Kosárlabda Klub now mostly known for sponsorship reasons as Zalakerámia ZTE KK is a professional basketball team from Zalaegerszeg, Hungary. ZTE currently plays in the Nemzeti Bajnokság I/A, the Hungarian top division. In its history the team has won four national championships – the last one in 2010 – and four national cups. Between 1994 till 1997 ZTE also played in Europe, in the Korać Cup.

== Honours ==
=== Domestic competitions ===
Nemzeti Bajnokság I/A (National Championship of Hungary)

- Champions (4): 1987–88, 1989–90, 1991–92, 2009–10
- Runners-up (4): 1985–86, 1990–91, 1993–94, 1994–95
- Third place (5): 1983–84, 1992–93, 1996–97, 2008–09, 2016–17

Magyar Kupa (National Cup of Hungary)

- Winners (4): 1988, 1990, 1992, 2010

== Current players ==
Note: Flags indicate national team eligibility at FIBA-sanctioned events. Players may hold other non-FIBA nationalities not displayed.

Zalaegerszeg TE roster
Players
Coaches

Pos.	No.	Nat.	Name	Ht.	Age
G	3	(United States)	O'Reilly, Liam	1.88 m (6 ft 2 in)	30 – 19 March 1996
PF	5	(United States)	Smith, Mitchell	2.08 m (6 ft 10 in)	28 – 28 October 1997
G/F	7	(Hungary)	Németh, Ákos	1.97 m (6 ft 6 in)	27 – 19 December 1998
G/F	9	(United States)	Bibbs, Justin	1.96 m (6 ft 5 in)	30 – 14 January 1996
G	10	(Hungary)	Simó, Bence	1.80 m (5 ft 11 in)	35 – 29 January 1991
SF	11	(United States)	Cardet Jr., Wesley	1.98 m (6 ft 6 in)	25 – 8 September 2001
G/F	12	(Hungary)	Keller, Iván	1.97 m (6 ft 6 in)	31 – 8 March 1995
SF	13	(Hungary)	Polster, Attila	2.01 m (6 ft 7 in)	26 – 17 August 2000
G	15	(Hungary)	Makkos, Dávid	1.90 m (6 ft 3 in)	22 – 28 April 2004
F	22	(Hungary)	Zsíros, Péter	2.00 m (6 ft 7 in)	32 – 22 June 1994
G	27	(Hungary)	Szalay, Domonkos	1.90 m (6 ft 3 in)	21 – 20 January 2005
F/C	41	(Hungary)	Csuti, Kornél	2.05 m (6 ft 9 in)	22 – 18 August 2004

Head coach

- (Slovenia) Sebastjan Krasovec

Assistant coach(es)

- (Hungary) Gergely Baki

Legend

- (C) Team captain
- Injured

- Roster
Updated: 5 January 2023

== Season by season ==
Season	Tier	League	Pos.	Domestic cup	European competitions	
1989–90	1	NB I/A	1st			
1990–91	1	NB I/A	2nd		1 Champions Cup	R16
1991–92	1	NB I/A	1st	Champion	3 Korać Cup	R1
1992–93	1	NB I/A	3rd		1 European League	R1
1993–94	1	NB I/A	2nd		3 Korać Cup	R2
1994–95	1	NB I/A	2nd		3 Korać Cup	R2
1995–96	1	NB I/A	4th	Champion	3 Korać Cup	R1
1996–97	1	NB I/A	3rd		3 Korać Cup	RS
1997–98	1	NB I/A	6th			
1998–99	1	NB I/A	8th			
1999–00	1	NB I/A	6th			
2000–01	1	NB I/A	7th			
2001–02	1	NB I/A	9th			
2002–03	1	NB I/A	5th			
2003–04	1	NB I/A	9th			
2004–05	1	NB I/A	10th			
2006–06	1	NB I/A	10th			
2006–07	1	NB I/A	6th			
2007–08	1	NB I/A	11th			
2008–09	1	NB I/A	3rd			
2009–10	1	NB I/A	1st	Champion		
2010–11	1	NB I/A	6th			
2011–12	1	NB I/A	14th^{1}			
2012–13	1	NB I/A	11th			
2013–14	1	NB I/A	12th			
2014–15	1	NB I/A	13th			
2015–16	1	NB I/A	5th	Quarterfinalist		
2016–17	1	NB I/A	3rd	Quarterfinalist		
2017–18	1	NB I/A	7th	Quarterfinalist		
2018–19	1	NB I/A	10th	Quarterfinalist		
2019–20	1	NB I/A	8th^{2}	Cancalled^{2}		
2020–21	1	NB I/A	13th	did not qualify		
2021–22	1	NB I/A	12th	did not qualify		
2022–23	1	NB I/A	4th	Quarterfinalist		
2023–24	1	NB I/A	4th	Quarterfinalist		
2024–25	1	NB I/A	4th	Quarterfinalist		

^1 Remained in the league due to the resignation of other teams to play in the league.
^2 Cancelled due to the COVID-19 pandemic in Hungary.
