= Miljan Rakić =

Serbian basketball player

NKA Pécs
- Title: Assistant coach
- League: Hungarian League

Personal information
- Born: May 14, 1986 (age 40) Novi Sad, SR Serbia, SFR Yugoslavia
- Listed height: 1.95 m (6 ft 5 in)
- Listed weight: 80 kg (176 lb)

Career information
- NBA draft: 2008: undrafted
- Playing career: 2004–2021
- Position: Guard

Career history

Playing
- 2004–2008: Hemofarm
- 2008: Mašinac Kraljevo
- 2008: Novi Sad
- 2008–2009: Bosna
- 2009–2010: Novi Sad
- 2010–2011: Radnički Kragujevac
- 2011: Sloboda Užice
- 2012: KAOD
- 2012–2013: Jászberényi KSE
- 2013–2014: Szolnoki Olaj
- 2014–2015: KTE-Duna Aszfalt
- 2015: Szolnoki Olaj
- 2015: Inter Bratislava
- 2016: Falco KC Szombathely
- 2016: Jászberényi KSE
- 2017: Vitória S.C.
- 2017–2019: Jászberényi KSE
- 2019: Proleter Naftagas
- 2020: Grindavík
- 2020–2021: Sveti Đorđe

Coaching
- 2024–present: NKA Pécs (assistant)

Career highlights
- Adriatic League champion (2005); 2× Hungarian League champion (2014, 2015); 2× Hungarian Cup winner (2014, 2015); Bosnian Cup winner (2009)
Medals
Men's basketball
Representing Serbia and Montenegro
U20 European Championship
Gold medal – first place	2006 Turkey	Team
Bronze medal – third place	2005 Russia	Team

Miljan Rakić (Serbian: Миљан Ракић, born May 14, 1986) is a Serbian former professional basketball player and coach. He currently serves as an assistant coach for NKA Pécs of the Hungarian Basketball League. Over his playing career, he has won the Hungarian League title twice, in 2014 and 2015, and the Adriatic League championship once, in 2005.

== Professional career ==
In June 2013, Rakić signed with Szolnoki Olaj. He started the 2014–15 season with KTE-Duna Aszfalt, but in February 2015, he returned to Szolnoki Olaj for the rest of the season.

On August 23, 2015, he signed with Slovakian team Inter Bratislava.

In January 2020, he signed with Grindavík of the Icelandic Úrvalsdeild karla. He helped Grindavík to the Icelandic Cup Finals in February 2020 where it lost to Stjarnan.

== National team ==
Rakić was member of Serbian junior national teams, with juniors of Serbia he won FIBA Europe Under-20 Championship in 2005.
