= Jászberényi KSE =

- Leagues: Nemzeti Bajnokság I/A
- Founded: 2001; 24 years ago
- History: Jászberényi KSE (2001–present)
- Arena: Belvárosi Ált. Isk. Sportcsarnok
- Capacity: 1,673
- Location: Jászberény, Hungary
- Team colors: Blue, White
- Website: jkse.hu
Home	Away

Jászberényi KSE, shortly JKSE, is a Hungarian professional basketball team based in Jászberény. The team plays in the Nemzeti Bajnokság I/A, the highest professional league in Hungary. The team was founded in 2001.

== History ==
Jászberényi KSE was founded in 2001. In 2005, KSE promoted to the Hungarian Second Division. In the 2009–10 season, the team was close to promoting, as it finished 3rd in the league. In the 2010–11 season, the team won the Playoffs and were named Second Division Champions. Starting from 2011 the team played in the first tier league. In the 2013–14 season, JKSE made its first European appearance in the EuroChallenge. The team had a 0–6 record in the competition, as it was eliminated in the regular season.

== Season by season ==
Season	Tier	League	Pos.	Domestic cup	European competitions		
2011–12	2	NB I/B	1st				
2012–13	1	NB I/A	5th				
2013–14	1	NB I/A	10th	Quarterfinalist	3 EuroChallenge	RS	0–6
2014–15	1	NB I/A	11th	did not qualify			
2015–16	1	NB I/A	12th	did not qualify			
2016–17	1	NB I/A	12th	did not qualify			
2017–18	1	NB I/A	12th	did not qualify			
2018–19	1	NB I/A	5th	Fourth place			
2019–20	1	NB I/A	14th^{1}	Cancalled^{1}			
2020–21	1	NB I/A	14th	did not qualify			
2021–22	2	NB I/B	2nd	did not qualify			
2022–23	2	NB I/B					

^1 Cancelled due to the COVID-19 pandemic in Hungary.

== European record ==
Jászberényi had a 0–6 (0%) record in one season of European play, which was the 2013–14 FIBA EuroChallenge.

Season	Competition	Round	Club	Home	Away
2013–14	FIBA EuroChallenge	RS	(Turkey) Tofaş	54–76	86–72
2013–14	FIBA EuroChallenge	RS	(Russia) Ural Yekaterinburg	64–84	88–85
2013–14	FIBA EuroChallenge	RS	(Slovenia) Krka	41–58	76–61

== Notable players ==
Note: Flags indicate national team eligibility at FIBA-sanctioned events. Players may hold other non-FIBA nationalities not displayed.

Criteria

To appear in this section a player must have either:

- Set a club record or won an individual award while at the club
- Played at least one official international match for their national team at any time
- Played at least one official NBA match at any time.

- (Croatia) Bruno Šundov
- (Serbia) Miljan Rakić
