= 2013–14 Nemzeti Bajnokság I/A (men's basketball) =

NB I/A
- Duration: October 4, 2013 - March 1, 2014 (regular season)
- Games played: 34 or 32
- Teams: 12 + 1

Regular season
- Top seed: Atomerőmű SE
- Relegated: ~~ZTE~~

Finals
- Champions: Szolnoki Olaj (6th title)
- Runners-up: Atomerőmű SE
- Third place: Sopron
- Fourth place: Kaposvári

Statistical leaders
Points	(United States) Dyricus Simms-Edwards	21.9
Rebounds	(United States) Wayne Chism	10.1
Assists	(United States) Louis Hinnant	6.0

The 2013–14 Nemzeti Bajnokság I/A was the 83rd season of the Nemzeti Bajnokság I/A, the highest tier professional basketball league in Hungary.

Szolnoki Olaj KK won its fifth domestic title, by sweeping Atomerőmű SE 3–0 in the Finals.

== Team information ==
The following 13 clubs competed in the NB I/A during the 2013–14 season:

Team	Position 2012-13	City	Arena	Capacity	Head coach
Alba Fehérvár	1st	Székesfehérvár	Vodafone Sportcentrum	2.400	(Spain) Carlos Frade
Atomerőmű SE	3rd	Paks	ASE Sportcsarnok	2.000	(Serbia) Branislav Džunić
BC Körmend	6th	Körmend	Városi Sportcsarnok	1.620	(Hungary) Tamás Hencsey
Falco KC	7th	Szombathely	Arena Savaria	4.000	(Hungary) László Kálmán
Jászberényi KSE	5th	Jászberény	Bercsényi úti Sportcsarnok	1.000	(Serbia) Srđan Antić
Kaposvári KK	4th	Kaposvár	Városi Sportcsarnok	1.200	(Hungary) Ádám Fekete
Kecskemét	1st (NB I/B)	Kecskemét	Messzi István Sportcsarnok	1.600	(Montenegro) Stojan Ivković
Nyíregyháza KK	12th	Nyíregyháza	Bujtosi Szabadidő Csarnok	2.068	(Hungary) Ernő Sitku
PVSK	8th	Pécs	Lauber Dezső Sportcsarnok	3.000	(Hungary) Ferenc Csirke
Sopron KC	9th	Sopron	MKB Aréna	1.316	(Hungary) Balázs Sabáli
Szedeák	10th	Szeged	Újszegedi Sportcsarnok	3.200	(Hungary) Domonkos Bonifert
Szolnoki Olaj	2nd	Szolnok	Tiszaligeti Sportcsarnok	3.000	(Serbia) Dragan Aleksić
ZTE	11th	Zalaegerszeg	Városi Sportcsarnok	2.500	(Spain) Raúl Jimenez

Team from Adriatic League

== Regular season ==
Locations of the 2013–14 Nemzeti Bajnokság I/A

=== Standings ===
	Team	Pld	W	L	PF	PA	Pts	
1	Atomerőmű SE	22	18	4	1832	1541	0.91	40
2	Alba Fehérvár	22	15	7	1858	1657	0.84	37
3	KTE-Duna Aszfalt	22	15	7	1591	1481	0.84	37
4	Sopron KC	22	14	8	1619	1559	0.82	36
5	Kaposvári KK	22	13	9	1791	1782	0.80	35
6	EGIS Körmend	22	13	9	1754	1759	0.80	35
7	Pécsi VSK-Pannonpower	22	9	13	1689	1725	0.70	31
8	Falco-Trend Optika KC Szombathely	22	8	14	1763	1822	0.68	30
9	Naturtex SZTE-Szedeák	22	8	14	1702	1807	0.68	30
10	Zalakerámia-ZTE KK	22	7	15	1663	1781	0.66	29
11	FORTRESS Jászberény	22	7	15	1693	1805	0.66	29
12	MARSO Nyíregyházi KK	22	5	17	1674	1910	0.61	27

Group 1st to 6th
Group 7th to 13th

Pld – Played; W – Won; L – Lost; PF – Points for; PA – Points against; Diff – Difference; Pts – Points.

=== Schedule and results ===
In the table below the home teams are listed on the left and the away teams along the top.

	ALBA	ASE	KÖR	FAL	JKSE	KAP	KTE	NYKK	PVSK	SOP	SZE	ZTE
Alba Fehérvár		81–65	90–93	77–81	96–77	97–73	81–57	115–82	97–74	75–68	88–60	113–83
Atomerőmű	90–71		98–82	84–61	73–63	97–73	60–50	116–76	81–62	84–57	79–65	88–51
Körmend	75–74	68–78		82–70	96–83	77–78	66–57	88–80	88–80	71–67	81–88	82–74
Falco	79–82	68–75	80–93		90–87	80–76	93–97	97–86	74–73	86–93	89–74	88–79
Jászberény	62–69	70–87	64–63	101–92		83–67	64–76	88–75	74–64	76–84	85–101	87–78
Kaposvár	92–83	99–92	95–72	92–83	81–72		73–87	95–71	76–69	79–69	97–94	81–83
Kecskemét	68–58	61–66	69–66	75–60	74–67	84–58		93–70	79–67	74–62	69–64	70–54
Nyíregyháza	81–91	86–99	82–91	69–93	64–78	80–67	72–82		58–78	73–63	89–78	85–79
PVSK	85–95	87–83	77–79	95–86	97–79	69–88	84–76	73–69		67–62	79–81	85–74
Sopron	69–56	59–76	74–66	78–69	90–70	93–79	66–60	76–62	70–64		82–76	66–53
Szedeák	75–84	74–86	89–92	90–82	84–75	67–87	59–68	89–71	90–84	65–86		80–70
Zalaegerszeg	68–85	77–75	112–83	64–62	104–88	80–85	71–65	81–93	66–76	78–85	84–59	

== Group 1st to 6th ==
=== Standings ===
	Team	Pld	W	L	PF	PA	PCT	Qualification
1	Szolnoki Olaj KK	10	9	1	443	399	.900	Qualified for the Playoffs
2	Atomerőmű SE	10	7	3	459	412	.700	Qualified for the Playoffs
3	Sopron KC	10	4	6	584	608	.400	Qualified for the Playoffs
4	Kaposvári KK	10	4	6	562	570	.400	Qualified for the Playoffs
5	KTE-Duna Aszfalt	10	3	7	520	557	.300	Qualified for the Playoffs
6	Alba Fehérvár	10	3	7	514	536	.300	Qualified for the Playoffs

Pld – Played; W – Won; L – Lost; PF – Points for; PA – Points against; Diff – Difference; Pts – Points.

=== Schedule and results ===
In the table below the home teams are listed on the left and the away teams along the top.

	ALBA	ASE	KAP	KTE	SOP	OLAJ
Alba Fehérvár		87–94	98–87	86–70	68–77	77–78
Atomerőmű	66–71		90–66	71–58	84–66	67–76
Kaposvár	101–93	76–84		72–62	78–70	97–76
Kecskemét	73–63	67–71	71–67		81–75	53–67
Sopron	72–60	74–77	86–77	74–57		69–76
Szolnoki Olaj	77–72	77–55	85–60	67–47	90–61	

== Group 7th to 13th ==
=== Standings ===
	Team	Pld	W	L	PF	PA	PCT	Qualification or Relegation
7	Pécsi VSK-Pannonpower	34	20	14	2522	2454	.588	Qualified for the Playoffs
8	EGIS Körmend	34	18	16	2629	2600	.529	Qualified for the Playoffs
9	Naturtex SZTE-Szedeák	34	15	19	2569	2634	.441	
10	FORTRESS Jászberény	34	13	21	2582	2749	.382	
11	Falco-Trend Optika KC Szombathely	34	13	21	2458	2589	.382	
12	Zalakerámia-ZTE KK	34	12	22	2511	2637	.353	Relegation playoff
13	MARSO Nyíregyházi KK	32	8	26	2483	2762	.235	Relegation playoff

Pld – Played; W – Won; L – Lost; PF – Points for; PA – Points against; Diff – Difference; Pts – Points.

=== Schedule and results ===
In the table below the home teams are listed on the left and the away teams along the top.

	KÖR	FAL	JKSE	NYKK	PVSK	SZE	ZTE
Körmend		86–82	92–67	101–87	80–84	–	81–84
Falco	101–97		74–79	93–83	63–83	100–97	106–92
Jászberény	88–79	87–86		93–81	–	95–97	83–73
Nyíregyháza	81–92	77–61	104–82		76–88	77–85	92–75
PVSK	72–69	84–62	93–67	81–70		90–83	83–71
Szedeák	95–86	94–69	84–77	78–75	81–89		96–76
Zalaegerszeg	97–87	85–92	78–87	91–81	86–66	93–79	

== Playoffs ==
Teams in bold won the playoff series. Numbers to the left of each team indicate the team's original playoff seeding. Numbers to the right indicate the score of each playoff game.

Quarterfinals
1	**Szolnoki Olaj KK**	**73**	**72**	**83**
8	EGIS Körmend	47	70	62
4	**Kaposvári KK**	**71**	**75**	**91**
5	KTE-Duna Aszfalt	69	73	80
2	**Atomerőmű SE**	**84**	**80**	**94**
7	Pécsi VSK-Pannonpower	75	56	69
3	**Sopron KC**	**89**	90	**78**	**94**
6	Alba Fehérvár	65	**95**	67	90

Semifinals
1	**Szolnoki Olaj KK**	**76**	**101**	**97**
4	Kaposvári KK	64	78	57
2	**Atomerőmű SE**	**69**	**62**	**83**
3	Sopron KC	39	51	66

Finals
1	**Szolnoki Olaj KK**	**77**	**77**	**79**
2	Atomerőmű SE	64	71	69
Third place
3	**Sopron KC**	**79**	**104**	–	–
4	Kaposvári KK	74	91	–	–

NB I/A 2013–14
Champions
**Szolnoki Olaj**
**5th Title**

Team roster

4 Balázs Simon, 6 Ákos Keller, 7 Obie Trotter, 8 Vuk Pavlović, 9 Dávid Vojvoda, 10 Radenko Pilčević, 11 Zoltán Tóth, 12 Miljan Rakić, 14 Márton Báder, 15 Tomislav Ivosev, 20 Máté Berkics, 21 Tamás Mándoki, 22 Justin Holiday, 24 Strahinja Milošević, 25 György Csaba, 30 Csaba Csákvári and 44 Péter Lóránt
Head coach: Dragan Aleksić

== Final standing ==
Rank	Team	Qualification or relegation
1st place, gold medalist(s)	Szolnoki Olaj KK (C)	2014–15 Eurocup regular season
2nd place, silver medalist(s)	Atomerőmű SE	2014–15 EuroChallenge regular season
3rd place, bronze medalist(s)	Sopron KC	
4	Kaposvári KK	
5	KTE-Duna Aszfalt	
6	Alba Fehérvár	
7	Pécsi VSK-Pannonpower	
8	EGIS Körmend	2014–15 EuroChallenge regular season
9	Naturtex SZTE-Szedeák	
10	FORTRESS Jászberény	
11	Falco-Trend Optika KC Szombathely	
12	Zalakerámia-ZTE KK	
13	MARSO Nyíregyházi KK (O)	

(C) = Champion; (R) = Relegated; (P) = Promoted; (E) = Eliminated; (O) = Play-off winner; (A) = Advances to a further round.
