= Kaposvári KK =

- Nickname: Dolphins (Delfinek)
- Leagues: Nemzeti Bajnokság I/A
- Founded: 1960
- Arena: Kaposvár Aréna
- Capacity: 3,000
- Location: Kaposvár, Hungary
- Team colors: Green and white
- President: Puska Zoltán
- Head coach: Dalibor Damjanović
- Championships: (2): 2000–2001, 2003–2004
- Website: www.delfinek.hu
Home	Away

Kaposvári KK, also known as Kometa Kaposvári KK for sponsorship reasons, is a professional basketball team based in Kaposvár, Hungary. The team plays in the Nemzeti Bajnokság I/A, the highest professional league in Hungary. The team was founded in 1960.

== Honours ==
=== Domestic competitions ===
Nemzeti Bajnokság I/A (National Championship of Hungary)

- Champions (2): 2000–01, 2003–04
- Runners-up (1): 2002–03

Magyar Kupa (National Cup of Hungary)

- Winners (1): 2004
- Finalist (1): 2001

=== European competitions ===
- FIBA Europe Regional Challenge Cup for Men 3. place (2002–2003)

== Season by season ==
Season	Tier	League	Pos.	Domestic cup	European competitions	
1989–90	1	NB I/A	11th			
1990–91	1	NB I/A	9th			
1991–92	1	NB I/A	6th			
1992–93	1	NB I/A	6th			
1993–94	1	NB I/A	9th			
1994–95	1	NB I/A	13th			
1995–96	2	NB I/B	1st			
1996–97	1	NB I/A	9th			
1997–98	1	NB I/A	9th			
1998–99	1	NB I/A	9th			
1999–00	1	NB I/A	5th			
2000–01	1	NB I/A	1st	Runner-up		
2001–02	1	NB I/A	5th		3 Korać Cup	R16
2002–03	1	NB I/A	2nd		4 Regional Challenge Cup	QF
2003–04	1	NB I/A	1st	Champion	4 FIBA Europe Cup	QF
2004–05	1	NB I/A	8th			
2005–06	1	NB I/A	7th			
2006–07	1	NB I/A	9th			
2007–08	1	NB I/A	12th			
2008–09	1	NB I/A	12th			
2009–10	1	NB I/A	9th			
2010–11	1	NB I/A	12th			
2011–12	1	NB I/A	9th			
2012–13	1	NB I/A	4th			
2013–14	1	NB I/A	4th	Quarterfinalist		
2014–15	1	NB I/A	5th	Quarterfinalist		
2015–16	1	NB I/A	7th	did not qualify		
2016–17	1	NB I/A	7th	Quarterfinalist		
2017–18	1	NB I/A	9th	did not qualify		
2018–19	1	NB I/A	12th	did not qualify		
2019–20	1	NB I/A	12th^{1}	Cancalled^{1}		
2020–21	1	NB I/A	12th	did not qualify		
2021–22	1	NB I/A	9th	did not qualify		
2022–23	1	NB I/A				

^1 Cancelled due to the COVID-19 pandemic in Hungary.

== Current roster ==
Note: Flags indicate national team eligibility at FIBA-sanctioned events. Players may hold other non-FIBA nationalities not displayed.

Kaposvári KK roster
Players
Coaches

Pos.	No.	Nat.	Name	Ht.	Age
G	1	(Hungary)	Paár, Márk	1.96 m (6 ft 5 in)	22 – 1 December 2003
C	2	(United States)	Hughes, Michael	2.03 m (6 ft 8 in)	28 – 1 February 1998
F	3	(Hungary)	Szőke, Bálint	1.97 m (6 ft 6 in)	21 – 21 January 2005
G	4	(Denmark)	Åris Petersen, Sebastian	1.91 m (6 ft 3 in)	30 – 9 December 1995
PG	5	(Hungary)	Halmai, Dániel	1.84 m (6 ft 0 in)	21 – 19 October 2004
G	7	(United States)	Brown, Isiah	1.88 m (6 ft 2 in)	28 – 4 September 1997
F/C	11	(Hungary)	Hendlein, Roland	2.03 m (6 ft 8 in)	40 – 18 January 1986
F/C	12	(Hungary)	Csorvási, Milán	2.08 m (6 ft 10 in)	37 – 23 April 1988
F	13	(United States)	Parsons, De'Sean	2.01 m (6 ft 7 in)	31 – 3 February 1995
F	14	(Hungary)	Antalics, Dániel	2.03 m (6 ft 8 in)	20 – 9 October 2005
G/F	21	(Hungary)	Puska, Bence	1.97 m (6 ft 6 in)	24 – 9 September 2001
F	23	(Hungary)	Attila Dominik, Hajduk	1.97 m (6 ft 6 in)	23 – 19 March 2003
G	31	(Serbia)	Krnjajski, Boris	1.90 m (6 ft 3 in)	27 – 31 October 1998
F	69	(Hungary)	Benedek, Bogdán	2.00 m (6 ft 7 in)	28 – 18 May 1997

Head coach

- (Slovenia) Dalibor Damjanović

Assistant coach(es)

- (Croatia) Ivan Rudež
- (Hungary) Balázs Szőke

Legend

- (C) Team captain
- Injured

- Roster
Updated: 30 December 2023

== Notable players ==
- (Hungary) Szilárd Benke (2012-16)
- (Croatia) Matija Češković (2007-08, 2009-10)
- (United States) Wayne Chism (2013-14)
- (Hungary) Branislav Dzunić (2001-05)
- (Hungary) Gordan Filipović (1992-99, 2000-07)
- (United States) Sterling Gibbs (2017-18)
- (Bosnia and Herzegovina) Emir Halimić (2000-01)
- (Hungary) Roland Hendlein (2003-10, 2012-)
- (Montenegro) Stojan Ivković (2000-04)
- (Lithuania) Kęstutis Marčiulionis (2005-06, 2008-09)
- (United States) Erron Maxey (2005-06)
- (Hungary) László Orosz (1998-00, 2006-10)
- (Hungary) Balázs Simon (2000-04)
- (Serbia) Marko Špica (2012-13, 2014-16, 2017-19)
- (Romania) Marcel Țenter (1996-97)
- (Hungary) Zoltán Trepák (2003-06)
- (United States) Emmanuel Ubilla (2015-16, 2018-19)
- (Hungary) Dávid Vojvoda (2006-10)
