= Soproni KC =

- Leagues: Nemzeti Bajnokság I/A
- Founded: 1991; 35 years ago
- History: Soproni KC (1991–1993); Soproni Ászok KC (1993–2005); Soproni sÖrdögök (2005–2009); Soproni KC (2009–present)
- Arena: MKB Aréna Sopron
- Capacity: 2,500
- Location: Sopron, Hungary
- Team colors: Blue, white
- Head coach: Gašper Potočnik
- Team captain: Márton Molnár
- Website: https://sopronkc.hu/
Home	Away

Soproni Kosárlabda Club, commonly known as Soproni KC or Sopron, is a professional basketball team based in Sopron, Hungary. The team competes in the Hungarian first tier Nemzeti Bajnokság I, and play their home games at the MKB Aréna Sopron, which has a capacity of 2,500.

== Honours ==
=== Domestic competitions ===
Nemzeti Bajnokság I/A (National Championship of Hungary)

- Third place (1): 2013–14

Magyar Kupa (National Cup of Hungary)

- Finalist (2): 2014, 2023

== Season by season ==
Season	Tier	League	Pos.	Domestic cup	European competitions		
1991–92	1	NB I/A	8th				
1992–93	1	NB I/A	9th				
1993–94	1	NB I/A	4th				
1994–95	1	NB I/A	9th				
1995–96	1	NB I/A	9th				
1996–97	1	NB I/A	14th				
1997–98	2	NB I/B	1st				
1998–99	1	NB I/A	6th				
1999–00	1	NB I/A	8th				
2000–01	1	NB I/A	13th				
2001–02	2	NB I/B	1st				
2002–03	1	NB I/A	12th				
2003–04	1	NB I/A	14th				
2004–05	2	NB I/B	1st				
2005–06	1	NB I/A	9th				
2006–07	1	NB I/A	12th				
2007–08	1	NB I/A	9th				
2008–09	1	NB I/A	8th				
2009–10	1	NB I/A	8th	Fourth place			
2010–11	1	NB I/A	9th	Third place			
2011–12	1	NB I/A	8th				
2012–13	1	NB I/A	9th				
2013–14	1	NB I/A	3rd	Runner-up			
2014–15	1	NB I/A	4th	Fourth place			
2015–16	1	NB I/A	6th	Third place	3 FIBA Europe Cup	RS	1–5
2016–17	1	NB I/A	10th	did not qualify	4 FIBA Europe Cup	RS	2–4
2017–18	1	NB I/A	13th	did not qualify			
2018–19	1	NB I/A	8th	did not qualify			
2019–20	1	NB I/A	11th^{1}	Cancalled^{1}			
2020–21	1	NB I/A	8th	did not qualify			
2021–22	1	NB I/A	6th	did not qualify			
2022–23	1	NB I/A	8th	Runner-up			
2023-24	1	NB I/A	7th	did not qualify			
2024–25	1	NB I/A	7th	did not qualify			
2025-26	1	NB I/A	7th	Quarter-Final			

^1 Cancelled due to the COVID-19 pandemic in Hungary.

== Current roster ==
Note: Flags indicate national team eligibility at FIBA-sanctioned events. Players may hold other non-FIBA nationalities not displayed.

Soproni KC roster
Players
Coaches

Pos.	No.	Nat.	Name	Ht.	Age
G	0	(Hungary)	Kovács, Áron	1.89 m (6 ft 2 in)	19 – 25 March 2007
G	3	(United States)	Wertz, Trey	1.92 m (6 ft 4 in)	26 – 6 December 1999
G	4	(Hungary)	Bősze, Gergő	1.86 m (6 ft 1 in)	19 – 16 November 2006
G/F	6	(Hungary)	Meszlényi, Róbert	1.94 m (6 ft 4 in)	22 – 29 April 2004
G	9	(Hungary)	Ruják, András	1.89 m (6 ft 2 in)	38 – 30 July 1988
F	10	(Hungary)	Baumgartner, Bálint	1.96 m (6 ft 5 in)	17 – 28 November 2008
F	13	(Hungary)	Kucsera, Dániel	2.00 m (6 ft 7 in)	27 – 30 September 1999
G	20	(United States)	Ford III, Robert	1.83 m (6 ft 0 in)	27 – 25 October 1999
F	21	(Hungary)	Kovács, Benedek	1.98 m (6 ft 6 in)	25 – 22 February 2001
F/C	24	(United States)	Thomas, Bryant	2.06 m (6 ft 9 in)	27 – 24 July 1999
C	25	(Hungary)	Kelenföldi, Domonkos	2.03 m (6 ft 8 in)	26 – 7 May 2000
F	33	(Hungary)	Keller, Bendegúz	1.92 m (6 ft 4 in)	20 – 28 May 2006
C	55	(Croatia)	Proleta, Domagoj	2.07 m (6 ft 9 in)	28 – 20 March 1998
F	99	(Hungary)	Hajdú, Péter	2.01 m (6 ft 7 in)	22 – 20 February 2004
			[[{{{first}}} | {{{first}}}]]

Head coach

- (Slovenia) Gašper Potočnik

Assistant coach(es)

- (Hungary) Szabolcs Baksa

Legend

- (C) Team captain
- Injured

- Roster
Updated: 2 February 2024

=== Depth chart ===
Pos.	Starting 5	Bench 1	Bench 2
C	Márton Molnár	Amadou Sidibé
PF	Tulio da Silva	Márton Sitku	Richárd Schöll
SF	Dayon Griffin	Attila Polster	Bendegúz Keller
SG	Róbert Meszlényi	Anthony Mathis	Csaba Fazekas
PG	David Nichols	Péter Csendes	Gergő Bősze

== Notable former players ==
- Brynton Lemar
