= Alba Fehérvár =

- Nickname: Albacomp, Alba
- Leagues: Nemzeti Bajnokság I/A
- Founded: 1949; 77 years ago
- History: List: Székesfehérvári MDSE 1949–1951 Székesfehérvári Építők 1951–1979 Alba Regia Építők 1979–1992 Albacomp 1992–2012 Alba Fehérvár 2012–present
- Arena: Alba Regia Sportcsarnok
- Capacity: 3,000
- Location: Székesfehérvár, Hungary
- Team colors: Blue, white, grey
- President: Imre Balássy
- Team manager: Balázs Simon
- Head coach: Zlatko Jovanović
- Championships: 5 Hungarian Championships; 4 Hungarian Basketball Cup; 1 Central European Basketball League
- Retired numbers: 1 (9)
- Website: albakosarhu
Home	Away

Alba Fehérvár is a Hungarian professional basketball club based in Székesfehérvár that competes Nemzeti Bajnokság I, the premier division of basketball in Hungary. Founded as the successor of Székesfehérvári MDSE, they took the Hungarian championship title five times and won the Hungarian cup on four occasions. In addition, Albacomp also were crowned as the Central European Basketball League champions in 2009.

== Players ==
=== Retired numbers ===
Alba retired numbers
N°	Nat.	Player	Position	Tenure	Date Retired
9	(Hungary)	Kornél Dávid	PF	1996–2000	2001

=== Current roster ===
Note: Flags indicate national team eligibility at FIBA-sanctioned events. Players may hold other non-FIBA nationalities not displayed.

Alba Fehérvár roster
Players
Coaches

Pos.	No.	Nat.	Name	Ht.	Wt.	Age
PG	0	(Hungary)	Balsay, Ádám	1.95 m (6 ft 5 in)	80 kg (176 lb)	25 – 30 August 2001
G	3	(Hungary)	Pongó, Marcell	1.95 m (6 ft 5 in)	85 kg (187 lb)	29 – 3 March 1997
PF	5	(Hungary)	Szabó, Zsolt	2.04 m (6 ft 8 in)	111 kg (245 lb)	40 – 22 April 1986
G	7	(Hungary)	Takács, Milán	1.93 m (6 ft 4 in)	90 kg (198 lb)	26 – 7 September 2000
SF	15	(Hungary)	Kertész, Dávid	1.94 m (6 ft 4 in)	85 kg (187 lb)	22 – 15 May 2004
PG	30	(Hungary)	Somogyi, Ádám	1.91 m (6 ft 3 in)	83 kg (183 lb)	26 – 30 June 2000
F/C	31	(Germany)	Philmore, Isaiah	2.03 m (6 ft 8 in)	105 kg (231 lb)	37 – 20 September 1989
SG	32	(United States)	Smith Jr., Lenzelle	1.93 m (6 ft 4 in)	95 kg (209 lb)	35 – 3 October 1991
G	34	(Hungary)	Takács, Martin	1.93 m (6 ft 4 in)	90 kg (198 lb)	26 – 7 September 2000
F	42	(Hungary)	Góbi, Marcell	1.97 m (6 ft 6 in)	86 kg (190 lb)	24 – 23 May 2002
C	50	(Senegal)	Diong, Cheikh	2.11 m (6 ft 11 in)	106 kg (234 lb)	26 – 11 December 1999
C	96	(Hungary)	Osztoics, Milán	2.08 m (6 ft 10 in)	98 kg (216 lb)	21 – 11 November 2004
SF	99	(Hungary)	Vojvoda, Dávid	1.95 m (6 ft 5 in)	93 kg (205 lb)	36 – 4 September 1990

Head coach

- (Bosnia and Herzegovina) Zlatko Jovanović

Assistant coach(es)

- (Hungary) Dániel Kertész

Legend

- (C) Team captain
- Injured

- Roster
Updated: January 1, 2023

=== Depth chart ===
Pos.	Starting 5	Bench 1	Bench 2
C	Isaiah Philmore	Cheikh Diong	Milán Osztoics
PF	Quincy Ford	Zsolt Szabó	Marcell Góbi
SF	Quenton DeCosey	Dávid Vojvoda	Dávid Kertész
SG	Marcell Pongó	Lenzelle Smith Jr	Martin Takács
PG	Ádám Somogyi	Milán Takács	Ádám Balsay

== Honours ==
=== Domestic competitions ===
Nemzeti Bajnokság I/A (National Championship of Hungary)

- Champions (5): 1997–98, 1998–99, 1999–00, 2012–13, 2016–17
- Runners-up (4): 2005–06, 2010–11, 2015–16, 2022–23
- Third place (7): 1995–96, 2003–04, 2004–05, 2007–08, 2011–12, 2017-18, 2023–24

Magyar Kupa (National Cup of Hungary)

- Winners (4): 1999, 1990, 2013, 2017
- Runners-up (3): 2004, 2005, 2011

=== European competitions ===
- Central European Basketball League (1):
  - 2009

== Season by season ==
Season	Tier	League	Pos.	Domestic cup	European competitions	
1989–90	1	NB I/A	15th			
1990–91	1	NB I/A	11th			
1991–92	1	NB I/A	10th			
1992–93	1	NB I/A	7th			
1993–94	1	NB I/A	6th			
1994–95	1	NB I/A	5th		3 Korać Cup	R2
1995–96	1	NB I/A	3rd		3 Korać Cup	R1
1996–97	1	NB I/A	3rd		3 Korać Cup	RS
1997–98	1	NB I/A	1st		3 Korać Cup	QR
1998–99	1	NB I/A	1st	Champion		
1999–00	1	NB I/A	1st	Champion	2 Saporta Cup	PR
2000–01	1	NB I/A	6th		3 Korać Cup	R1
2001–02	1	NB I/A	5th			
2002–03	1	NB I/A	3rd		4 Regional Challenge Cup	QF
2003–04	1	NB I/A	3rd	Runner-up		
2004–05	1	NB I/A	3rd	Runner-up	4 FIBA Europe Cup	QF
2005–06	1	NB I/A	2nd			
2006–07	1	NB I/A	6th			
2007–08	1	NB I/A	3rd			
2008–09	1	NB I/A	5th			
2009–10	1	NB I/A	5th	Third place		
2010–11	1	NB I/A	2nd	Runner-up		
2011–12	1	NB I/A	3rd	Fourth place		
2012–13	1	NB I/A	1st	Champion		
2013–14	1	NB I/A	6th	Quarterfinalist	2 Eurocup	RS
2014–15	1	NB I/A	9th	Quarterfinalist		
2015–16	1	NB I/A	2nd	Quarterfinalist		
2016–17	1	NB I/A	1st	Champion	4 FIBA Europe Cup	R2
2017–18	1	NB I/A	3rd	Fourth place	3 Champions League	QR3
2017–18	1	NB I/A	3rd	Fourth place	4 FIBA Europe Cup	R16
2018–19	1	NB I/A	11th	did not qualify		
2019–20	1	NB I/A	6th^{1}	Cancalled^{1}		
2020–21	1	NB I/A	5th	Quarterfinalist		
2021–22	1	NB I/A	3rd	Fourth place		
2022–23	1	NB I/A	2nd	Quarterfinalist		
2023–24	1	NB I/A	3rd	Quarterfinalist	4 FIBA Europe Cup	RS
2024–25	1	NB I/A	8th	Quarterfinalist	4 FIBA Europe Cup	RS

^1 Cancelled due to the COVID-19 pandemic in Hungary.

== Sponsorship ==
Year	Name	Kit Sponsor	Kit Manufacturer
2022-23	Alba Fehérvár	Szerencsejáték Zrt.	Macron (home), Hummel (away)
2021-22	Alba Fehérvár	Szerencsejáték Zrt.	Hummel
2020-21	Alba Fehérvár	Szerencsejáték Zrt.	Hummel
2019-20	Alba Fehérvár	Szerencsejáték Zrt.	Spalding
2018-19	Alba Fehérvár	Szerencsejáték Zrt.	Spalding
2017-2018	Alba Fehérvár	Huawei	Spalding
2016–2017	Alba Fehérvár	Hungrana	Spalding
2015–2016	Alba Fehérvár	Hungrana	Spalding
2014–2015	Alba Fehérvár	Hungrana	Spalding
2013–2014	Alba Fehérvár	Magyar Korona	Spalding
2012–2013	Alba Fehérvár	Magyar Korona	Spalding
2011–2012	Albacomp Fehérvár	Nescafé	Spalding
2010–2011	Albacomp	Nescafé	Spalding
2009–2010	Albacomp	Nescafé	Spalding
2008–2009	Albacomp	Nescafé	Spalding
2007–2008	Albacomp	Garzon Bútor	Spalding
2006–2007	Albacomp	Garzon Bútor	Spalding
2005–2006	Albacomp	Garzon Bútor	Converse
2004–2005	Albacomp	Garzon Bútor	Converse
2003–2004	Albacomp	Garzon Bútor	Adidas
2002–2003	Albacomp	Garzon Bútor	Adidas

== Notable players ==
Note: Flags indicate national team eligibility at FIBA-sanctioned events. Players may hold other non-FIBA nationalities not displayed.

Criteria

To appear in this section a player must have either:

- Set a club record or won an individual award while at the club
- Played at least one official international match for their national team at any time
- Played at least one official NBA match at any time.

Hungarians

- (Hungary) Kornél Dávid
- (Hungary) Ádám Hanga
- (Hungary) Márton Báder
- (Hungary) Péter Lóránt
- (Hungary) Dávid Vojvoda

Foreigners

- (Canada) Justin Edwards
- (Ghana) Alhaji Mohammed
- (Kosovo) (North Macedonia) Muhamed Thaçi
- (Montenegro) Velibor Radović
- (United States) Lance Blanks
- (United States) Ronnie McMahan
- (United States) George Banks
- (United States) Tony Crocker
- (United States) Lasan Kromah
- (United States) Damian Hollis
- (United States) Jarrod Jones
- (United States) Ronald Moore
- (United States) Brandon Wood
- (United States) James Farr
- (United States) Winston Shepard
- (United States) Brandon Taylor
- (United States) Maurice Kemp

== Head coaches ==
- (Hungary) Sándor Farkas
- (Hungary) Imre Vetési
- (Serbia) Branislav Dzunić
- (Spain) Jesus Ramirez
