= PVSK Panthers =

Pécsi VSK-Veolia
- Nickname: Vasút
- Leagues: NB I/B
- Founded: 1944; 82 years ago
- History: List: Pécsi VSK (1944–1948, 1956–1994, 2000–) Pécsi Lokomotív (1948–1954) Pécsi Törekvés (1954–1956) PVSK-Pécsvárad (1994–2000)
- Arena: Lauber Dezső Sports Hall
- Capacity: 3,036
- Location: Pécs, Hungary
- Main sponsor: Veolia
- Team manager: Gábor Bán
- Championships: 1 Hungarian Cups
Home	Away

PVSK-Panthers, for sponsorship reasons known as PVSK-Veolia or simply Pécs, is a men's basketball club based in Pécs, Hungary. It was the oldest non-Budapest based basketball club playing in the Nemzeti Bajnokság I/A, the first division of Hungary, until 2022, when they were relegated. They played 53 seasons in the top division, which is the second most after MAFC. PVSK-Panthers won one trophy in its history: the Hungarian Cup in 2009.

== History ==
The team was founded in 1944, they played in the 1st division from 1946 to 1950, then after 4 year, from 1955 to 1985 continuously (with once in 1972 in the 2nd league). In 1985 they fall to the 2nd, in 1992 to the 3rd league. In 1994 they moved to Pécsvárad. In 2000 they won the 3rd division and moved back to Pécs, in 2003 they returned into the top flight. In 2009 they won the regular season and the Hungarian Cup, and finished runner-up in the play-offs.

In Pécs, there was another basketball team. In the 1940s and 1950s the PEAC was placed in the 1st division too, and then in the 1990s again under the name of Matáv SE Pécs. Currently they are in the 2nd league.

== Honours ==
=== Domestic competitions ===
Nemzeti Bajnokság I/A (National Championship of Hungary)

- Runners-up (1): 2008–09
- Third place (1): 2006–07

Magyar Kupa (National Cup of Hungary)

- Winners (1): 2009
- Bronze medal (1): 1983, 2007

== Current roster ==
Note: Flags indicate national team eligibility at FIBA-sanctioned events. Players may hold other non-FIBA nationalities not displayed.

Pécs Panthers roster
Players
Coaches

Pos.	No.	Nat.	Name	Ht.	Age
G/F	1	(Hungary)	Szabadfi, Márk	1.92 m (6 ft 4 in)	22 – 8 June 2004
PG	2	(Hungary)	Halász, Ákos	1.83 m (6 ft 0 in)	35 – 8 August 1991
SF	3	(Hungary)	Werner, Viktor	2.04 m (6 ft 8 in)	27 – 5 March 1999
F/C	4	(United States)	Henry, Shane	2.03 m (6 ft 8 in)	32 – 10 December 1993
SF	5	(Serbia)	Carev, Aleksej	2.00 m (6 ft 7 in)	26 – 18 February 2000
G/F	8	(Croatia)	Barnjak, Josip	1.93 m (6 ft 4 in)	27 – 16 December 1998
PG	9	(Hungary)	Ruják, András	1.89 m (6 ft 2 in)	38 – 30 July 1988
PF	10	(United States)	Calloway, Jacob	2.02 m (6 ft 8 in)	30 – 30 April 1996
G/F	11	(Hungary)	Varga, Gergő	1.92 m (6 ft 4 in)	23 – 22 April 2003
SG	13	(Hungary)	Mucza, Tamás	1.90 m (6 ft 3 in)	26 – 27 December 1999
G	17	(Hungary)	Illés, Máté	1.91 m (6 ft 3 in)	31 – 6 June 1995
F/C	19	(Hungary)	Dorogi, Gergő	2.03 m (6 ft 8 in)	26 – 3 May 2000
C	21	(Hungary)	Pápai, Máté	2.03 m (6 ft 8 in)	28 – 20 June 1998
G	25	(Serbia)	Dimitrijevic, Djordje	1.88 m (6 ft 2 in)	29 – 6 February 1997
F	55	(Lithuania)	Krestinin, Denis	2.01 m (6 ft 7 in)	32 – 15 April 1994

Head coach

- (Slovenia) Sebastjan Krašovec

Assistant coach(es)

- (Serbia) Miljan Rakić
- (Hungary) Ármin Fodor

Physiotherapist(s)

- (Serbia) Branislav Golubović

Legend

- (C) Team captain
- Injured

- Roster
Updated: January 1, 2025

== Season by season ==
Season	Tier	League	Pos.	Magyar kupa	European competitions	
2000–01	2	NB I/B	20th			
2001–02	2	NB I/B	15th			
2002–03	2	NB I/B	15th			
2003–04	1	NB I/A	12th			
2004–05	1	NB I/A	5th			
2005–06	1	NB I/A	4th			
2006–07	1	NB I/A	3rd	Bronze medal		
2007–08	1	NB I/A	6th	Quarterfinalist		
2008–09	1	NB I/A	2nd	Winner		
2009–10	1	NB I/A	11th			
2010–11	1	NB I/A	8th	Quarterfinalist		
2011–12	1	NB I/A	7th	Quarterfinalist		
2012–13	1	NB I/A	8th	Fourth place		
2013–14	1	NB I/A	7th			
2014–15	1	NB I/A	7th	Quarterfinalist		
2015–16	1	NB I/A	8th	Fourth place		
2016–17	1	NB I/A	6th	Quarterfinalist		
2017–18	1	NB I/A	6th	Quarterfinalist		
2018–19	1	NB I/A	3rd	Quarterfinalist		
2019–20	1	NB I/A	5th		4 FIBA Europe Cup	RS
2020–21	1	NB I/A	11th			
2021–22	1	NB I/A	14th			
2022–23	2	NB I/B	2nd			
2023–24	2	NB I/B	1st			
2024–25	1	NB I/A	14th			

== Notable players ==
- (Hungary) Zoltán Horváth (2003–05)
- (Montenegro) Stojan Ivković (2004–06)
- (Serbia) Dragan Aleksić (2005–09)
- (Hungary) Krisztián Wittmann (2006–09)
- (Hungary) András Ruják (2009–10, 2019–21)
- (United States) Alex Legion (2012–13)
- (United States) Brad Loesing (2012–13)
- (Croatia) Marino Šarlija (2013–14)
- (Hungary) Zoltán Supola (2016–18)
