= Marino Šarlija =

Croatian basketball player

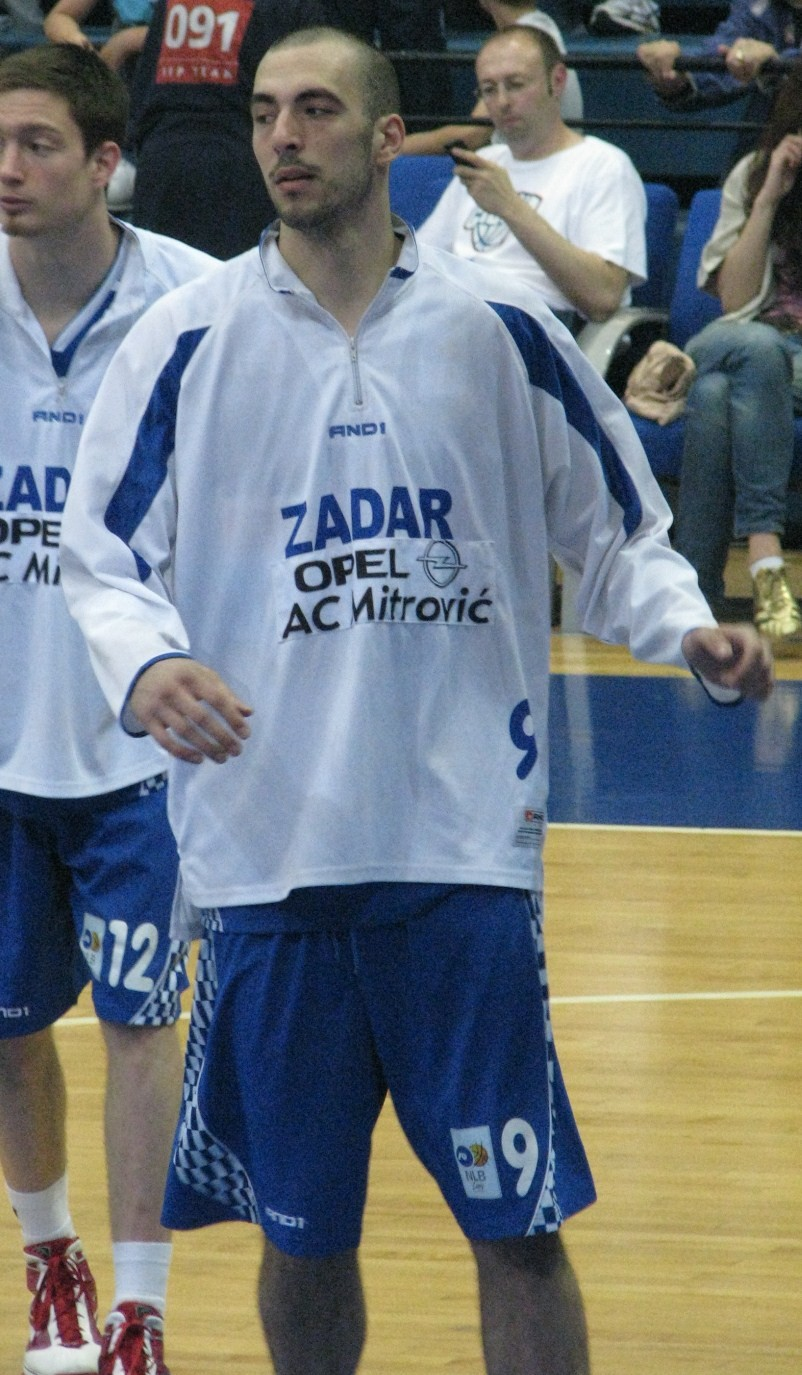
- Marino Sarlija, 2010.

No. 9 – Sonik-Puntamika
- Position: Center / power forward
- League: Croatian League

Personal information
- Born: January 13, 1989 (age 37) Zagreb, SR Croatia, SFR Yugoslavia
- Listed height: 6 ft 10 in (2.08 m)
- Listed weight: 240 lb (109 kg)

Career information
- Playing career: 2007–present

Career history
- 2007–2008: Zagreb
- 2008–2009: Sonik-Puntamika
- 2009–2010: Zadar
- 2010–2012: Sonik-Puntamika
- 2012–2013: Đuro Đaković
- 2013: Kumanovo
- 2014: Pecsi VSK-Veolia
- 2014–2016: Zagreb
- 2016–2017: Fürstenfeld Panthers
- 2017–2018: Pecsi VSK-Veolia
- 2018: Zabok
- 2018–2020: Kapfenberg Bulls
- 2020–present: Sonik-Puntamika

Career highlights
- Croatian League champion (2008); Austrian League champion (2019); Austrian Cup winner (2019); Austrian Supercup winner (2019)

Marino Šarlija (born January 13, 1989) is a Croatian professional basketball player who currently plays for the Sonik-Puntamika of the Croatian League. He is the son of the former basketball player Stipe Šarlija.
