= Atomerőmű SE =

- Leagues: Nemzeti Bajnokság I/A
- Founded: 1979; 47 years ago
- Arena: ASE Sportcsarnok
- Capacity: 2,005
- Location: Paks, Hungary
- Team colors: Blue, red, white
- Head coach: Ferenc Csirke
- Championships: 4 Hungarian Championships; 4 Hungarian Cups
- Retired numbers: 2 (8, 18)
- Website: kosarlabda.ase.hu
Home	Away	Third

Atomerőmű SE, sometimes shortened to ASE, is a Hungarian professional basketball team based in Paks. The team plays in the Nemzeti Bajnokság I/A, the highest professional league in Hungary. The team was founded in 1979 and has won the Hungarian championship four times.

== Honours ==
=== Domestic competitions ===
- Nemzeti Bajnokság I/A
  - Champions (4): 2001–02, 2004–05, 2005–06, 2008–09
    - Runners-up (4): 2000–01, 2003–04, 2009–10, 2013–14
- Magyar Kupa
  - Winners (4): 2001, 2003, 2005, 2008
    - Runners-up (3): 2002, 2006, 2012

== Current players ==
Note: Flags indicate national team eligibility at FIBA-sanctioned events. Players may hold other non-FIBA nationalities not displayed.

Paksi Atomerőmű roster
Players
Coaches

Pos.	No.	Nat.	Name	Ht.	Age
G	1	(Hungary)	Frank, Áron	1.91 m (6 ft 3 in)	26 – 20 January 2000
G/F	3	(Hungary)	Gulyás, Milán	1.92 m (6 ft 4 in)	27 – 18 June 1998
SG	4	(Hungary)	Pajor, Dávid	1.88 m (6 ft 2 in)	25 – 4 February 2001
C	5	(Nigeria)	Taiwo, Samuel	2.05 m (6 ft 9 in)	25 – 6 June 2000
G	6	(Hungary)	Kovács, Ákos	1.83 m (6 ft 0 in)	37 – 16 August 1988
F/C	7	(Hungary)	Eilingsfeld, János	1.98 m (6 ft 6 in)	35 – 5 February 1991
F	9	(Serbia)	Grubor, Milos	2.01 m (6 ft 7 in)	35 – 13 January 1991
F	10	(Hungary)	Géringer, Gergő	1.95 m (6 ft 5 in)	20 – 10 October 2005
F/C	11	(Hungary)	Csizmadia, Attila	2.05 m (6 ft 9 in)	23 – 29 November 2002
G	15	(United States Virgin Islands)	Edwin, Deon	1.90 m (6 ft 3 in)	33 – 9 August 1992
G	17	(Hungary)	Kékesi, Kolos	1.82 m (6 ft 0 in)	20 – 16 January 2006
F/C	20	(United States)	Atkinson Jr., Paul	2.06 m (6 ft 9 in)	26 – 27 March 1999
SG	23	(United States)	Buckingham, De'Monte	1.93 m (6 ft 4 in)	28 – 18 December 1997
G/F	25	(Hungary)	Karosi, Gergely	1.92 m (6 ft 4 in)	26 – 7 May 1999

Head coach

- (North Macedonia) Aleksandar Jončevski

Assistant coach(es)

- (Hungary) Áron Szentendrei

Legend

- (C) Team captain
- Injured

- Roster
Updated: 5 February 2023

== Notable players ==
- Jarrod Jones (born 1990)
- (United States) Deshon Taylor

== Season by season ==
Season	Tier	League	Pos.	Domestic cup	European competitions	
1989–90	1	NB I/A	7th			
1990–91	1	NB I/A	7th			
1991–92	1	NB I/A	11th			
1992–93	1	NB I/A	11th			
1993–94	1	NB I/A	7th			
1994–95	1	NB I/A	6th			
1995–96	1	NB I/A	6th			
1996–97	1	NB I/A	8th			
1997–98	1	NB I/A	5th			
1998–99	1	NB I/A	4th	Third place		
1999–00	1	NB I/A	9th			
2000–01	1	NB I/A	2nd	Champion	3 Korać Cup	R64
2001–02	1	NB I/A	1st	Runner-up	3 Korać Cup	R16
2002–03	1	NB I/A	6th	Champion	3 Champions Cup	GS
2003–04	1	NB I/A	2nd			
2004–05	1	NB I/A	1st	Champion		
2005–06	1	NB I/A	1st	Runner-up		
2006–07	1	NB I/A	5th			
2007–08	1	NB I/A	7th	Champion		
2008–09	1	NB I/A	1st			
2009–10	1	NB I/A	2nd			
2010–11	1	NB I/A	4th	Fourth place		
2011–12	1	NB I/A	5th	Runner-up	3 EuroChallenge	RS
2012–13	1	NB I/A	3rd	Third place		
2013–14	1	NB I/A	2nd	Fourth place	3 EuroChallenge	RS
2014–15	1	NB I/A	3rd	Third place	3 EuroChallenge	RS
2015–16	1	NB I/A	4th	Quarterfinalist		
2016–17	1	NB I/A	11th	did not qualify		
2017–18	1	NB I/A	8th	Third place		
2018–19	1	NB I/A	6th	Quarterfinalist		
2019–20	1	NB I/A	3rd^{1}	Cancalled^{1}		
2020–21	1	NB I/A	6th	Quarterfinalist		
2021–22	1	NB I/A	13th	did not qualify		
2022–23	1	NB I/A	9th	Quarterfinalist		
2023–24	1	NB I/A	10th	did not qualify		
2024–25	1	NB I/A	3rd	Third place		

^1 Cancelled due to the COVID-19 pandemic in Hungary.
