= Szolnoki Olajbányász =

- Nickname: Olaj (en: oil)
- Leagues: Nemzeti Bajnokság I/A; Europe Cup
- Founded: 1959; 67 years ago
- History: List: Alföldi Olajbányász 1959–1988 Szolnoki Olajbányász 1988–1993 Szolnoki Olaj KK 1993–2000 MOL Szolnok 2000–2004 Szolnoki Olaj KK 2004–2019 Szolnoki Olajbányász 2019–present
- Arena: Tiszaligeti Sportcsarnok
- Capacity: 3,000
- Location: Szolnok, Hungary
- Team colors: Red, Black
- Team manager: Tamás Csősz
- Head coach: Vedran Bosnić
- Championships: 9 Hungarian Leagues; 10 Hungarian Cups
- Website: olajofficial.hu
Home	Away	Third

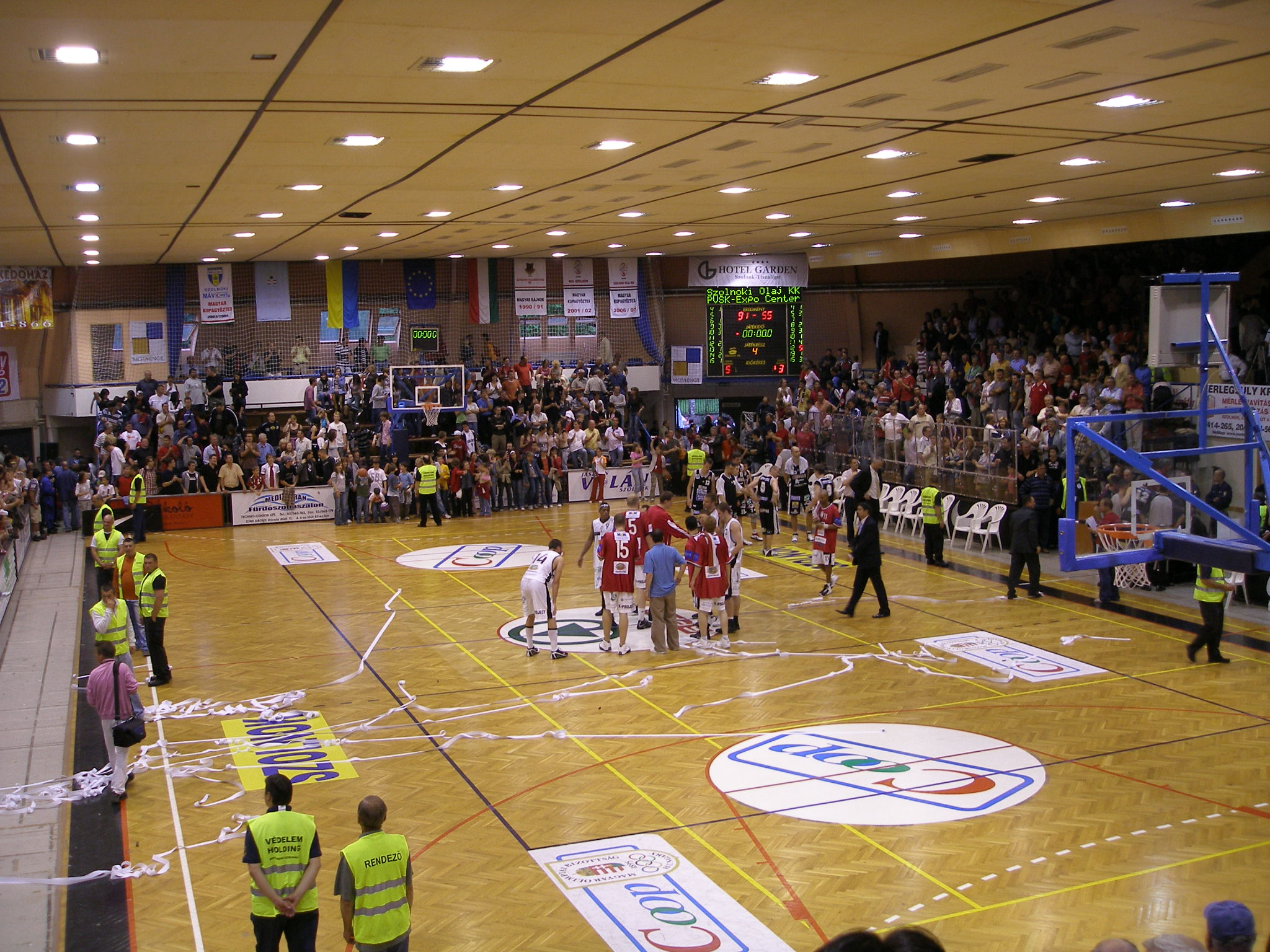
Semifinal game against PVSK Pécs in 2007

Szolnoki Olajbányász is a professional basketball team based in Szolnok, Hungary. The team also goes by the name of Olaj, which is a well-known nickname in the country. The club competes in the Hungarian League.

Established in 1959, it is one of the most successful teams in Hungarian basketball with nine Hungarian championships. Olaj has also won ten Hungarian Cup titles. The team's home arena is the Tiszaligeti Sportcsarnok.

== History ==
The club was founded in 1959, and it has since developed into one of the most successful basketball teams in Hungary. Olaj has won four Hungarian National Championships, four Hungarian Cups since 1989 (the year when they earned a spot in the Hungarian 1st division).

Former Szolnoki Olaj logo used until 2019

In 2012, the club played the EuroChallenge Final Four where they were beaten by Beşiktaş Milangaz. For the 2012–13 season, Szolnoki Olaj was invited to join the Adriatic League. In 2014 they won the Hungarian Basketball Cup once again. Szolnok made the EuroChallenge Final Four for the second time made in 2014, and ended on the 4th place once again, after losing to Triumph Lyubertsy and Royal Halı Gaziantep.

== Team ==
=== Current roster ===
Note: Flags indicate national team eligibility at FIBA-sanctioned events. Players may hold other non-FIBA nationalities not displayed.

Szolnoki Olajbányász roster
Players
Coaches

Pos.	No.	Nat.	Name	Ht.	Wt.	Age
G	0	(United States)	Pierre-Louis, Josh	1.93 m (6 ft 4 in)		25 – 8 May 2001
G	1	(United States)	Goodwin, Chevez	1.93 m (6 ft 4 in)		28 – 27 February 1998
G/F	3	(Hungary)	Pallai, Tamás	1.92 m (6 ft 4 in)		25 – 19 February 2001
PF	4	(United States)	Barnes, Auston	2.03 m (6 ft 8 in)		34 – 4 December 1991
G	5	(United States)	Brantley, Khalil	1.84 m (6 ft 0 in)		25 – 17 October 2001
F/C	6	(Hungary)	Molnár, Márton	2.08 m (6 ft 10 in)		32 – 7 January 1994
SF	7	(Hungary)	Rudner, Gábor	1.96 m (6 ft 5 in)		28 – 1 March 1998
G/F	11	(Hungary)	Dávid, Tamás	1.95 m (6 ft 5 in)		18 – 4 January 2008
G	13	(Serbia)	Krnjajski, Boris	1.90 m (6 ft 3 in)		27 – 31 October 1998
PF	23	(Hungary)	Cseh, Botond	1.97 m (6 ft 6 in)		21 – 29 November 2004
F/C	99	(Hungary)	Huszár, Balázs	2.02 m (6 ft 8 in)		19 – 26 April 2007

Head coach

- (Finland) Mikko Larkas

Assistant coach(es)

- (Finland) Risto-Matti Rousku
- (Hungary) Tamás Mándoki

Legend

- (C) Team captain
- Injured

- Roster
Updated: October 20, 2026

== Honours ==
=== Domestic competitions ===
Nemzeti Bajnokság I/A (National Championship of Hungary)

- Champions (9): 1990–91, 2006–07, 2010–11, 2011–12, 2013–14, 2014–15, 2015–16, 2017–18, 2024–25
- Runners-up (4): 1992–93, 1999–00, 2012–13, 2023–24
- Third place (2): 1994–95, 1997–98

Magyar Kupa (National Cup of Hungary)

- Winners (10): 2002, 2007, 2011, 2012, 2014, 2015, 2018, 2019, 2022, 2024
- Finalist (6): 1993, 1994, 1995, 2013, 2016, 2017

== Notable players ==
Note: Flags indicate national team eligibility at FIBA-sanctioned events. Players may hold other non-FIBA nationalities not displayed.

Criteria

To appear in this section a player must have either:

- Set a club record or won an individual award while at the club
- Played at least one official international match for their national team at any time
- Played at least one official NBA match at any time.

- (Finland) Alex Murphy
- (United Kingdom) (United States) Tarik Phillip
- (Hungary) Márton Báder
- (Hungary) Ákos Keller
- (Hungary) Péter Lóránt
- (Hungary) Greg Somogyi
- (Serbia) Strahinja Milošević
- (United States) Aaron Craft
- (United States) Justin Holiday

== Season by season ==
Season	Tier	League	Pos.	Domestic cup	European competitions	
1989–90	1	NB I/A	10th			
1990–91	1	NB I/A	1st			
1991–92	1	NB I/A	5th		1 European League	R2
1991–92	1	NB I/A	5th		2 European Cup	R3
1992–93	1	NB I/A	2nd	Runner-up	3 Korać Cup	R3
1993–94	1	NB I/A	5th	Runner-up	3 Korać Cup	R2
1994–95	1	NB I/A	3rd	Runner-up	3 Korać Cup	R2
1995–96	1	NB I/A	7th		3 Korać Cup	R2
1996–97	1	NB I/A	7th			
1997–98	1	NB I/A	3rd			
1998–99	1	NB I/A	7th			
1999–00	1	NB I/A	2nd			
2000–01	1	NB I/A	4th		3 Korać Cup	R32
2001–02	1	NB I/A	4th	Champion		
2002–03	1	NB I/A	8th	Fourth place		
2003–04	1	NB I/A	10th			
2004–05	1	NB I/A	6th			
2005–06	1	NB I/A	8th			
2006–07	1	NB I/A	1st	Champion		
2007–08	1	NB I/A	4th			
2008–09	1	NB I/A	7th	Third place		
2009–10	1	NB I/A	4th			
2010–11	1	NB I/A	1st	Champion	3 EuroChallenge	RS
2011–12	1	NB I/A	1st	Champion	3 EuroChallenge	4th
2012–13	1	NB I/A	2nd	Runner-up	3 EuroChallenge	L16
2013–14	1	NB I/A	1st	Champion	3 EuroChallenge	4th
2014–15	1	NB I/A	1st	Champion	2 Eurocup	RS
2015–16	1	NB I/A	1st	Runner-up	2 Eurocup	L32
2016–17	1	NB I/A	5th	Runner-up	3 Champions League	RS
2017–18	1	NB I/A	1st	Champion	4 FIBA Europe Cup	R2
2018–19	1	NB I/A	4th	Champion	3 Champions League	QR1
2018–19	1	NB I/A	4th	Champion	4 FIBA Europe Cup	R2
2019–20	1	NB I/A	7th^{1}	Cancalled^{1}		
2020–21	1	NB I/A	2nd	Third place	4 FIBA Europe Cup	RS
2021–22	1	NB I/A	5th	Champion	4 FIBA Europe Cup	RS
2022–23	1	NB I/A	5th	Third place		
2023–24	1	NB I/A	2nd	Champion		
2024–25	1	NB I/A	1st		4 FIBA Europe Cup	RS

^1 Cancelled due to the COVID-19 pandemic in Hungary.

=== In European competition ===
Source: basketball.eurobasket.com

- Participations in EuroCup: 2x
- Participations in Champions League: 2x
- Participations in FIBA Europe Cup: 5x
- Participations in EuroChallenge: 4x
- Participations in Korać Cup: 2x

Season	Competition	Round	Club	Home	Away	Aggregate
1995–96	Korać Cup	First round	(Bosnia and Herzegovina) KK Cenex	(wo.)		
1995–96	Korać Cup	Round of 64	(Greece) Aris Moda Bagno	64-66	72-106	136–172
2000–01	Korać Cup	First round	(Poland) Pogón Ruda Ślaska	110-68	70-95	180–163
2000–01	Korać Cup	Round of 64	(Austria) UKJ Sübe	82-68	87-87	169–155
2000–01	Korać Cup	Round of 32 (Group F)	(Italy) Viola Reggio Calabria	–	–	3rd
2000–01	Korać Cup	Round of 32 (Group F)	(Italy) Telit Trieste	–	–	3rd
2000–01	Korać Cup	Round of 32 (Group F)	(Switzerland) Olympique Lausanne	–	–	3rd
2010–11	EuroChallenge	Qualifying round	(Cyprus) Keravnos	75-52	67-56	142–108
2010–11	EuroChallenge	Regular season (Group A)	(Russia) Spartak Saint Petersburg	88–72	70–88	3rd
2010–11	EuroChallenge	Regular season (Group A)	(France) Gravelines-Dunkerque	70–69	71–82	3rd
2010–11	EuroChallenge	Regular season (Group A)	(Russia) Nizhny Novgorod	86–82	62–76	3rd
2011–12	EuroChallenge; Fourth place	Qualifying round	(Finland) Tampereen Pyrintö	68-57	69-77	137–134
2011–12	EuroChallenge; Fourth place	Regular season (Group H)	(Germany) Artland Dragons	90–85	78–86	2nd
2011–12	EuroChallenge; Fourth place	Regular season (Group H)	(Cyprus) Keravnos	81–93	91–82	2nd
2011–12	EuroChallenge; Fourth place	Regular season (Group H)	(France) Pau-Lacq-Orthez	85–70	75–67	2nd
2011–12	EuroChallenge; Fourth place	Last 16 (Group J)	(France) Élan Chalon	90–81	64–85	2nd
2011–12	EuroChallenge; Fourth place	Last 16 (Group J)	(Germany) Telekom Baskets Bonn	96–94	75–89	2nd
2011–12	EuroChallenge; Fourth place	Last 16 (Group J)	(Belgium) Generali Okapi Aalstar	112–76	84–86	2nd
2011–12	EuroChallenge; Fourth place	Quarterfinal	(Latvia) Ventspils	2–1		
2011–12	EuroChallenge; Fourth place	Semifinal (F4)	(Turkey) Beşiktaş Milangaz	60–64		
2011–12	EuroChallenge; Fourth place	Third place (F4)	(Russia) Triumph Lyubertsy	87–94		
2012–13	EuroChallenge	Regular season (Group F)	(Romania) Elba Timișoara	77–71	93–80	2nd
2012–13	EuroChallenge	Regular season (Group F)	(Germany) EWE Baskets Oldenburg	67–85	70–87	2nd
2012–13	EuroChallenge	Regular season (Group F)	(Hungary) Lami-Véd Körmend	83–94	96–92	2nd
2012–13	EuroChallenge	Last 16 (Group J)	(France) Paris-Levallois	74–80	71–93	3rd
2012–13	EuroChallenge	Last 16 (Group J)	(France) Gravelines-Dunkerque	75–71	78–82	3rd
2012–13	EuroChallenge	Last 16 (Group J)	(Israel) Hapoel Unet Holon	81–66	77–72	3rd
2013–14	EuroChallenge; Fourth place	Regular season (Group H)	(Belarus) Tsmoki Minsk	69–68	68–76	2nd
2013–14	EuroChallenge; Fourth place	Regular season (Group H)	(Bulgaria) Rilski Sportist	73–66	78–76	2nd
2013–14	EuroChallenge; Fourth place	Regular season (Group H)	(Romania) BC Mureș	68–76	85–72	2nd
2013–14	EuroChallenge; Fourth place	Last 16 (Group J)	(Italy) Pallacanestro Reggiana	90–78	68–90	2nd
2013–14	EuroChallenge; Fourth place	Last 16 (Group J)	(France) Cholet Basket	65–48	85–70	2nd
2013–14	EuroChallenge; Fourth place	Last 16 (Group J)	(Slovenia) KK Krka	74–67	78–89	2nd
2013–14	EuroChallenge; Fourth place	Quarterfinal	(Estonia) Tartu Ülikool/Rock	2–1		
2013–14	EuroChallenge; Fourth place	Semifinal (F4)	(Russia) Triumph Lyubertsy	59–61		
2013–14	EuroChallenge; Fourth place	Third place (F4)	(Turkey) Royal Halı Gaziantep	75–87		
2014–15	EuroCup	Regular season (Group D)	(Russia) Khimki	65–79	84–98	5th
2014–15	EuroCup	Regular season (Group D)	(Turkey) Beşiktaş Integral Forex	70–73	68–67	5th
2014–15	EuroCup	Regular season (Group D)	(Russia) Zenit Saint Petersburg	96–94	61–81	5th
2014–15	EuroCup	Regular season (Group D)	(Latvia) VEF Rīga	96–84	61–71	5th
2014–15	EuroCup	Regular season (Group D)	(Slovenia) Union Olimpija	80–86	67–89	5th
2015–16	EuroCup	Regular season (Group E)	(Turkey) Beşiktaş Sompo Japan	85–67	67–76	4th
2015–16	EuroCup	Regular season (Group E)	(Lithuania) Lietuvos rytas	65–89	99–98	4th
2015–16	EuroCup	Regular season (Group E)	(Russia) Zenit Saint Petersburg	75–84	64–89	4th
2015–16	EuroCup	Regular season (Group E)	(Russia) Avtodor Saratov	83–79	78–104	4th
2015–16	EuroCup	Regular season (Group E)	(Greece) PAOK	78–69	69–72	4th
2015–16	EuroCup	Last 32 (Group N)	(Italy) Banco di Sardegna Sassari	86–75	74–90	4th
2015–16	EuroCup	Last 32 (Group N)	(Turkey) Galatasaray Odeabank	54–74	59–87	4th
2015–16	EuroCup	Last 32 (Group N)	(Spain) CAI Zaragoza	70–80	60–88	4th
2016–17	Champions League	Regular season (Group E)	(Greece) AEK Athens	76–89	49–92	8th
2016–17	Champions League	Regular season (Group E)	(Serbia) Partizan NIS	55–70	67–77	8th
2016–17	Champions League	Regular season (Group E)	(Poland) Stelmet Zielona Góra	86–75	63–83	8th
2016–17	Champions League	Regular season (Group E)	(Turkey) Beşiktaş Sompo Japan	91–96	74–89	8th
2016–17	Champions League	Regular season (Group E)	(Italy) Dinamo Sassari	73–72	88–97	8th
2016–17	Champions League	Regular season (Group E)	(Germany) MHP Riesen Ludwigsburg	81–91	56–99	8th
2016–17	Champions League	Regular season (Group E)	(Belgium) Proximus Spirou	74–79	87–92	8th
2017–18	FIBA Europe Cup	Qual. Round 1	(Turkey) Trabzonspor Medical Park	108-98	68-77	176–175
2017–18	FIBA Europe Cup	Qual. Round 2	(Sweden) Södertälje Kings	86-63	73-75	159–138
2017–18	FIBA Europe Cup	Regular season (Group H)	(Russia) Nizhny Novgorod	97–71	70–78	2nd
2017–18	FIBA Europe Cup	Regular season (Group H)	(Hungary) Falco Vulcano	89–79	74–84	2nd
2017–18	FIBA Europe Cup	Regular season (Group H)	(North Macedonia) Karpoš Sokoli	94–73	91–73	2nd
2017–18	FIBA Europe Cup	Last 16 (Group K)	(Denmark) Bakken Bears	91–68	96–100	4th
2017–18	FIBA Europe Cup	Last 16 (Group K)	(Belarus) Tsmoki-Minsk	79–45	61–86	4th
2017–18	FIBA Europe Cup	Last 16 (Group K)	(Montenegro) Mornar Bar	89–92	68–73	4th
2018–19	Champions League	Qual. Round 1	(Italy) Red October Cantù	68-69	71-90	139–159
2018–19	FIBA Europe Cup					
2018–19	FIBA Europe Cup	Regular season (Group H)	(Italy) Dinamo Sassari	87–74	94–98	1st
2018–19	FIBA Europe Cup	Regular season (Group H)	(Hungary) Falco Vulcano	79–76	83–66	1st
2018–19	FIBA Europe Cup	Regular season (Group H)	(United Kingdom) Leicester Riders	82–79	84–81	1st
2018–19	FIBA Europe Cup	Last 16 (Group I)	(Germany) s.Oliver Würzburg	83–92	71–118	4th
2018–19	FIBA Europe Cup	Last 16 (Group I)	(Turkey) Pınar Karşıyaka	70–74	95–102	4th
2018–19	FIBA Europe Cup	Last 16 (Group I)	(Kosovo) Z-Mobile Prishtina	89–76	76–81	4th
2020–21	FIBA Europe Cup	Regular season (Group C)	(Poland) Stal Ostrów Wielkopolski	80–90	—	3rd
2020–21	FIBA Europe Cup	Regular season (Group C)	(Israel) Ironi Nes Ziona	73–90	—	3rd
2020–21	FIBA Europe Cup	Regular season (Group C)	(Portugal) Sporting CP	78–67	—	3rd
2021–22	FIBA Europe Cup	Regular season (Group H)	(Poland) Legia Warsaw	68–75	66–83	4th
2021–22	FIBA Europe Cup	Regular season (Group H)	(Romania) Oradea	58–75	70–78	4th
2021–22	FIBA Europe Cup	Regular season (Group H)	(Portugal) Porto	81–64	68–76	4th
2024–25	FIBA Europe Cup	Regular season (Group I)	(Portugal) Porto	71–88	68–77	4th
2024–25	FIBA Europe Cup	Regular season (Group I)	(Greece) PAOK mateco	69–92	66–82	4th
2024–25	FIBA Europe Cup	Regular season (Group I)	(Belgium) Hubo Limburg United	95–100	74–77	4th
2025–26	Champions League	Regular season (Group F)	(Greece) AEK Betsson	80–69	77–91	2nd
2025–26	Champions League	Regular season (Group F)	(Slovakia) Patrioti Levice	84–54	71–73	2nd
2025–26	Champions League	Regular season (Group F)	(Austria) VEF Rīga	77–76	62–76	2nd
2025–26	Champions League	Play-ins	(Italy) Pallacanestro Trieste	62–82	89–80	86–87
