= Nemzeti Bajnokság I/A =

Premier men's basketball league in Hungary

- Founded: 1933; 93 years ago
- First season: 1933
- Country: Hungary
- Confederation: FIBA Europe
- Number of teams: 14
- Level on pyramid: 1
- Relegation to: NB I/B
- Domestic cup: Magyar Kupa
- International cup(s): Basketball Champions League; FIBA Europe Cup
- Current champions: Falco KC Szombathely (7th title) (2025–26)
- Most championships: Honvéd (33 titles)
- TV partners: M4 Sport
- Website: hunbasket.hu
- 2025–26 NB I/A season

The Nemzeti Bajnokság I/A (English: National Championship I/A, commonly abbreviated NB I/A) is the highest level league of club men's basketball in Hungary.

== Format ==
The league comprises 14 teams. A NB I/A season is split into a league stage and a playoff/playout stage. At the end of the league stage (14 teams) the top 5 teams play another league stage, another 5 play with each other, and then the top 8 teams qualify for the playoff stage. The playoffs are played in "Best of five" format. The winning team of the final round are the champions of that season.

The two bottom teams play with each other in "Best of three" format. The losing team gets relegated.

== Current season ==
=== Teams of the 2025–26 season ===
Locations of 2025–26 NB I/A clubs

Team	City	Hall	Capacity
Alba Fehérvár	Székesfehérvár	Vodafone Sportcsarnok	2,400
Atomerőmű SE	Paks	ASE Sportcsarnok	1,200
Budapest Honvéd	Budapest	Ludovika Aréna	1,320
DEAC	Debrecen	Oláh Gábor utcai Sportcsarnok	1,200
Egis Körmend	Körmend	Szentély Sportcsarnok	2,000
Falco KC Szombathely	Szombathely	Arena Savaria	4,000
Kometa-KVGY Kaposvári KK	Kaposvár	Kaposvár Aréna	3,000
KTE-Duna Aszfalt	Kecskemét	Messzi István Sportcsarnok	1,600
NKA Universitas Pécs	Pécs	Nemzeti Kosárlabda Akadémia	500
OSE Lions	Oroszlány	Krajnyik András Sportcsarnok	1,400
Soproni KC	Sopron	Aréna Sopron	2,500
Szolnoki Olajbányász	Szolnok	Tiszaligeti Sportcsarnok	2,080
SZTE Szedeák	Szeged	Újszegedi Sportcsarnok	3,200
Zalakerámia ZTE	Zalaegerszeg	Városi Sportcsarnok	1,800

== Title holders ==
- 1933: Közgazdasági Egyetem
- 1934: BSZKRT Előre
- 1934–35: TFSE
- 1935–36: MAFC
- 1936–37: BSZKRT Előre (2)
- 1937–38: BSZKRT Előre (3)
- 1938–39: BSZKRT Előre (4)
- 1939–40: BSZKRT Előre (5)
- 1940–41: BSZKRT Előre (6)
- 1941–42: BEAC
- 1943: BSZKRT Előre (7)
- 1944: MAFC (2)
- 1945: BSZKRT Előre (8)
- 1945–46: Bp. Kinizsi TE
- 1946–47: Bp. Postás
- 1947–48: MÁVAG
- 1948–49: BSZKRT Előre (9)
- 1949–50: MAFC (3)
- 1950: MÁVAG
- 1951: MAFC (4)
- 1952: Budapesti Honvéd (1)
- 1953: Budapesti Honvéd (2)
- 1954: Budapesti Honvéd (3)
- 1955: Budapesti Honvéd (4)
- 1956: MAFC (5)
- 1957: Budapesti Honvéd (5)
- 1957–58: Budapesti Honvéd (6)
- 1958–59: Budapesti Honvéd (7)
- 1959–60: Budapesti Honvéd (8)
- 1960–61: Budapesti Honvéd (9)
- 1961–62: Budapesti Honvéd (10)
- 1962–63: Budapesti Honvéd (11)
- 1964: Budapesti Honvéd (12)
- 1965: Budapesti Honvéd (13)
- 1966: Budapesti Honvéd (14)
- 1967: Budapesti Honvéd (15)
- 1968: Budapesti Honvéd (16)
- 1969: Budapesti Honvéd (17)
- 1970: MAFC (6)
- 1971: Budapesti Honvéd (18)
- 1972: Csepel (1)
- 1973: Csepel (2)
- 1974: Budapesti Honvéd (19)
- 1975: MAFC (7)
- 1976: Budapesti Honvéd (20)
- 1977: Budapesti Honvéd (21)
- 1978: Budapesti Honvéd (22)
- 1979: Budapesti Honvéd (23)
- 1980–81: Budapesti Honvéd (24)
- 1981–82: Budapesti Honvéd (25)
- 1982–83: Budapesti Honvéd (26)
- 1983–84: Budapesti Honvéd (27)
- 1984–85: Budapesti Honvéd (28)
- 1985–86: Budapesti Honvéd (29)
- 1986–87: Körmend (1)
- 1987–88: Zalaegerszegi TE (1)
- 1988–89: Csepel (3)
- 1989–90: Zalaegerszegi TE (2)
- 1990–91: Szolnoki Olaj (1)
- 1991–92: Zalaegerszegi TE (3)
- 1992–93: Budapesti Honvéd (30)
- 1993–94: Budapesti Honvéd (31)
- 1994–95: Budapesti Honvéd (32)
- 1995–96: Körmend (2)
- 1996–97: Budapesti Honvéd (33)
- 1997–98: Alba Fehérvár (1)
- 1998–99: Alba Fehérvár (2)
- 1999–00: Alba Fehérvár (3)
- 2000–01: Kaposvár (1)
- 2001–02: Atomerőmű (1)
- 2002–03: Körmend (3)
- 2003–04: Kaposvár (2)
- 2004–05: Atomerőmű (2)
- 2005–06: Atomerőmű (3)
- 2006–07: Szolnoki Olaj (2)
- 2007–08: Falco Szombathely (1)
- 2008–09: Atomerőmű (4)
- 2009–10: Zalaegerszegi TE (4)
- 2010–11: Szolnoki Olaj (3)
- 2011–12: Szolnoki Olaj (4)
- 2012–13: Alba Fehérvár (4)
- 2013–14 : Szolnoki Olaj (5)
- 2014–15 : Szolnoki Olaj (6)
- 2015–16 : Szolnoki Olaj (7)
- 2016–17 : Alba Fehérvár (5)
- 2017–18 : Szolnoki Olaj (8)
- 2018–19 : Falco KC Szombathely (2)
- 2019–20 : Cancelled due to the COVID-19 pandemic
- 2020–21 : Falco KC Szombathely (3)
- 2021–22 : Falco KC Szombathely (4)
- 2022–23 : Falco KC Szombathely (5)
- 2023–24 : Falco KC Szombathely (6)
- 2024–25 : Szolnoki Olaj (9)
- 2025–26 : Falco KC Szombathely (7)

== Performance by club ==
Club	Champions	Winning years
Bp. Honvéd	33	1952, 1953, 1954, 1955, 1957, 1957–58, 1958–59, 1959–60, 1960–61, 1961–62, 1962–63, 1964, 1965, 1966, 1967, 1968, 1969, 1971, 1974, 1976, 1977, 1978, 1979, 1980–81, 1981–82, 1982–83, 1983–84, 1984–85, 1985–86, 1992–93, 1993–94, 1994–95, 1996–97
BSZKRT Előre	9	1934, 1936–37, 1937–38, 1938–39, 1939–40, 1940–41, 1943, 1945, 1948–49
Szolnoki Olajbányász	9	1990–91, 2006–07, 2010–11, 2011–12, 2013–14, 2014–15, 2015–16, 2017–18, 2024–25
MAFC	7	1935–36, 1944, 1949–50, 1951, 1956, 1970, 1975
Falco	7	2007–08, 2018–19, 2020–21, 2021–22, 2022–23, 2023–24, 2025–26
Alba Fehérvár	5	1997–98, 1998–99, 1999–2000, 2012–13, 2016–17
Atomerőmű	4	2001–02, 2004–05, 2005–06, 2008–09
ZTE	4	1987–88, 1989–90, 1991–92, 2009–10
Csepel	3	1972, 1973, 1988–89
Körmend	3	1986–87, 1995–96, 2002–03
Ganz-MÁVAG VSE	2	1947–48, 1950
Kaposvár	2	2000–01, 2003–04
Közgazdasági Egyetem AC	1	1933
TFSC	1	1934–35
BEAC	1	1941–42
Budai Kinizsi TE	1	1945–46
Postás SE	1	1946–47

== Finals ==
Season	Home court advantage	Result	Home court disadvantage	1st of Regular Season	Record
1984–85	Bp. Honvéd	2–1	MAFC	Bp. Honvéd	16–2
2013–14	Szolnoki Olajbányász	3–0	Atomerőmű SE	Atomerőmű SE	18–4
2014–15	Szolnoki Olajbányász	3–0	Kecskeméti TE	Atomerőmű SE	18–4
2015–16	Szolnoki Olajbányász	3–1	Alba Fehérvár	Szolnoki Olajbányász	20–6
2016–17	Alba Fehérvár	3–2	Falco	Alba Fehérvár	21–5
2017–18	Szolnoki Olajbányász	3–1	Falco	Szolnoki Olajbányász	21–5
2018–19	Körmend	0–3	Falco	Körmend	20–6

Season	Champion	Score	Runner-up	Third place	Fourth place
2018–19	Falco	3–0	Körmend	PVSK Panthers	Szolnoki Olaj
2019–20	Cancelled due to the COVID-19 pandemic				
2020–21	Falco	3–2	Szolnoki Olajbányász	Szedeák	DEAC
2021–22	Falco	3–2	Körmend	–	
2022–23	Falco	3–2	Alba Fehérvár	Körmend	ZTE
2023–24	Falco	3–1	Szolnoki Olajbányász	Alba Fehérvár	ZTE
2024–25	Szolnoki Olajbányász	3–0	Falco	Atomerőmű	ZTE
2025–26	Falco	3–2	Szolnoki Olajbányász	Atomerőmű	Kaposvári

== Format ==
As we can see from the chart the number of teams in the Hungarian First Division changed a lot and continuously. The league started in 1933 with ten teams and with the formation of teams the league expanded continuously. Currently, there are 14 teams in the first division.

== Topscorers ==
=== Total points ===
Season	Player	Team	Points
1997-98	(Hungary) Braniszlav Dzunics	ZTE KK	535 pts
1998-99	(United States) Darryl Parker	Soproni KC	
1999-00			
2000-01	(Hungary) Kálmán László	Falco KC Szombathely	555 pts
2001-02	(United States) Damon Williams	Alba Fehérvár	574 pts
2002-03	(United States) Patrick Lee	Vadkakasok	523 pts
2003-04	(United States) Delmonte Madison	PVSK-Panthers	602 pts
2004-05	(Hungary) Kálmán László	Falco KC Szombathely	702 pts
2005-06	(Hungary) Kálmán László (3)	Falco KC Szombathely	746 pts
2006-07	(United States) Rashad Bell	ZTE KK	651 pts
2007-08	(United States) Larry Blair	Kecskemeti Univer KSE	566 pts
2008-09	(United States) George Banks	Körmend	579 pts
2009-10	(United States) Calvin Watson	Falco KC Szombathely	456 pts
2010-11	(United States) Muhammad El-Amin	PVSK-Panthers	574 pts
2011-12	(United States) Justin Ingram	Factum Sport Debrecen	639 pts
2012-13	(United States) Cristopher Dunn	Kaposvári KK	441 pts
2013-14	(Serbia) Marko Rakočević	Körmend	420 pts
2014-15			
2015-16	(United States) Darrin Govens	ZTE KK	491 pts
2016-17	(Bulgaria) Ivan Lilov	Szedeák	525 pts

=== Per game ===
Season	Player	Team	PPG
1997-98	(Hungary) Braniszlav Dzunics	ZTE KK	26,8
1998-99	(United States) Darryl Parker	Soproni KC	24,8
1999-00			
2000-01	(Hungary) Kálmán László	Falco KC Szombathely	25,2
2001-02	(United States) Darryl Parker (2)	ZTE KK	26,67
2002-03	(United States) Patrick Lee	Vadkakasok	23,77
2003-04	(Hungary) Kálmán László	Falco KC Szombathely	24,96
2004-05	(Hungary) Kálmán László	Falco KC Szombathely	29,25
2005-06	(Hungary) Kálmán László (4)	Falco KC Szombathely	29,8
2006-07	(United States) Rashad Bell	ZTE KK	26,0
2007-08	(United States) Julien Mills	Dombovar	23,22
2008-09	(United States) George Banks	Körmend	22,27
2009-10	(United States) Jara Rubin Doyne	Falco KC Szombathely	21,35
2010-11	(United States) Jara Rubin Doyne (2)	Falco KC Szombathely	23,29
2011-12	(United States) Justin Ingram	Factum Sport Debrecen	24,58
2012-13	(Serbia) Marko Špica	Kaposvári KK	20.61
2013-14	(United States) Dyricus Simms-Edwards	Kaposvári KK	21.9
2014-15	(Serbia) Nermin Hujdurović	Hubner Nyiregyhaza	22.8
2015-16	(United States) Garrick Sherman	Jászberény	19,13
2016-17	(Serbia) Andrija Bojić	Szedeák	20,6
2017-18	(United States) Sterling Gibbs	Kaposvári KK	20.7
2018-19	(United States) Damier Pitts	Jászberényi KSE	20.00
2019–20	(United States) Reggie Johnson	ZTE KK	21.8
2020-21	(United States) Darrin Govens	Szedeák	19.96
2021–22	(United States) Tayler Persons	Jászberényi KSE	21.8
2022–23	(United States) Darius Perry	Hubner NBS	21.8
2023–24	(United States) Noah Locke	Szedeák	23.8
2024–25	(United States) Daylen Kountz	Körmend	22.04

== Awards ==
=== MVP ===
Season	Player	Team
2002-03	(Uganda) (Slovakia) David Toya	Debreceni EAC
2003-04	(Hungary) Balazs Simon	Kaposvar
2004-05	(Hungary) Laszlo Kalman	Falco KC-Szombathely
2005-06	(United States) Chris Monroe	Atomeromu SE Paks
2006-07	(United States) Rashad Bell	Zalakeramia-ZTE KK
2007-08	(Hungary) Laszlo Kalman	Falco KC-Szombathely
2008-09		
2009-10	(United States) Calvin Watson	Zalakeramia-ZTE KK
2010-11	(United States) Obie Trotter	Falco KC Szombathely
2011-12	(United States) Obie Trotter (2)	Szolnok
2012-13	(United States) Christopher Dunn	Kaposvari
2013-14	(Hungary) Roland Hendlein	Kaposvári KK
2014-15	(Belgium) Nikolas Raivio	Kaposvari
2015-16	(Hungary) David Vojvoda	Szolnok
2016-17	(United States) Darrin Govens	Falco Szombathely
2017-18	(United States) Kendrick Perry	Szolnok
2018-19	(United States) Kameron Taylor	PVSK Panthers
2019–20		
2020-21	(United States) Darrin Govens (2)	Szedeák
2021–22	(Hungary) Zoltan Perl	Falco KC Szombathely
2022–23	(Hungary) Zoltan Perl	Falco KC Szombathely
2023–24	(Hungary) Zoltan Perl (3)	Falco KC Szombathely
2024–25	(Canada) Fardaws Aimaq	NHSZ-Szolnoki Olajbanyasz

=== Finals MVP ===
Season	Player	Team
2006-07	(United States) Thomas Kelley	Szolnoki
2012-13	(United States) Brandon Wood	Albacomp
2014-15	(Hungary) David Vojvoda	Szolnok
2015-16	(Hungary) David Vojvoda (2)	Szolnok
2016-17	(United States) Winston Shepard	Albacomp
2017-18	(United States) Kendrick Perry	Szolnok
2018-19	(United States) Evan Bruinsma	
2019–20		
2020-21	(Hungary) Zoltan Perl	Falco KC Szombathely
2021–22	(Hungary) Zoltan Perl	Falco KC Szombathely
2022–23	(Hungary) Zoltan Perl	Falco KC Szombathely
2023–24	(Hungary) Zoltan Perl (4)	Falco KC Szombathely
2024–25	(Hungary) Adam Somogyi	NHSZ-Szolnoki Olajbanyasz

== See also ==
- Magyar Kupa (men's basketball)
