= 2022–23 Szolnoki Olajbányász season =

Hungarian basketball season

Szolnoki Olajbányász
2022–23 season
- General manager: Tamás Csősz
- Head coach: (Slovenia) Gašper Potočnik
- Arena: Tiszaligeti Sportcsarnok
- Nemzeti Bajnokság I/A: Pre-season
| Home | Away |

The 2022–23 season is Szolnoki Olajbányász's the 63rd in existence and the club's 34th consecutive season in the top tier of Hungarian basketball.

Times up to 30 October 2022 and from 26 March 2023 are CEST (UTC+2). Times from 30 October 2022 to 26 March 2023 are CET (UTC+1).

== Players ==
=== Current roster ===
Note: Flags indicate national team eligibility at FIBA-sanctioned events. Players may hold other non-FIBA nationalities not displayed.

Szolnoki Olajbányász roster
Players
Coaches

| Pos. | No. | Nat. | Name | Ht. | Wt. | Age |
|---|---|---|---|---|---|---|
| PF | 0 | (United States) | Barnes, Auston | 2.03 m (6 ft 8 in) | 100 kg (220 lb) | 33 – 4 December 1991 |
| PG | 1 | (United States) | Durham, Jabril | 1.85 m (6 ft 1 in) | 80 kg (176 lb) | 31 – 23 January 1994 |
| SG | 3 | (Hungary) | Pallai, Tamás | 1.92 m (6 ft 4 in) | 75 kg (165 lb) | 24 – 19 February 2001 |
| G/F | 4 | (Hungary) | Vincze, Roland | 1.93 m (6 ft 4 in) | 80 kg (176 lb) | 21 – 30 November 2003 |
| SG | 6 | (United States) | Gavin, Jimmy | 1.91 m (6 ft 3 in) | 86 kg (190 lb) | 33 – 28 August 1991 |
| SF | 7 | (Hungary) | Rudner, Gábor | 1.96 m (6 ft 5 in) | 90 kg (198 lb) | 27 – 1 March 1998 |
| PF | 8 | (Hungary) | Abraham, Arabo | 2.04 m (6 ft 8 in) | 90 kg (198 lb) | 22 – 1 January 2003 |
| SG | 9 | (Hungary) | Tóth, József | 1.90 m (6 ft 3 in) | 75 kg (165 lb) | 20 – 11 September 2004 |
| PF | 10 | (Hungary) | Révész, Ádám | 2.00 m (6 ft 7 in) | 90 kg (198 lb) | 29 – 2 August 1995 |
| PF | 11 | (Montenegro) | Subotić, Bojan | 2.03 m (6 ft 8 in) | 102 kg (225 lb) | 34 – 17 December 1990 |
| G/F | 12 | (Hungary) | Csornai, Bence | 1.92 m (6 ft 4 in) | 90 kg (198 lb) | 22 – 4 September 2002 |
| G | 15 | (Hungary) | Sebők, András | 1.85 m (6 ft 1 in) | 84 kg (185 lb) | 22 – 4 April 2003 |
| F | 18 | (Hungary) | Lukács, Norbert | 2.03 m (6 ft 8 in) | 95 kg (209 lb) | 24 – 18 May 2001 |
| PG | 21 | (Hungary) | Pongó, Máté | 1.85 m (6 ft 1 in) | 81 kg (179 lb) | 31 – 15 December 1993 |
| SF | 24 | (Hungary) | Gilszki, Erik | 1.98 m (6 ft 6 in) | 88 kg (194 lb) | 24 – 13 January 2001 |
| F/C | 35 | (Hungary) | Mokánszki, Máté | 2.02 m (6 ft 8 in) | 95 kg (209 lb) | 24 – 23 October 2000 |
| C | 50 | (United States) | Williamson, Andre | 2.03 m (6 ft 8 in) | 108 kg (238 lb) | 35 – 13 October 1989 |

Head coach

- (Slovenia) Gašper Potočnik

Assistant coach(es)

- (Hungary) Gábor Szarvas
- (Hungary) Tamás Mándoki

Physiotherapist(s)

- (Hungary) Dániel Ecseki

Legend

- (C) Team captain
- Injured

- Roster
Updated: March 1, 2023

=== Depth chart ===
| Pos. | Starting 5 | Bench |
|---|---|---|
| C | Andre Williamson | András Sebők |
| PF | Bojan Subotić | Ádám Révész |
| SF | Norbert Lukács | Gábor Rudner |
| SG | Tamás Pallai | Jabril Durham |
| PG | Jimmy Gavin | Auston Barnes |

=== Transactions ===
==== In ====
| No. | Pos. | Nat. | Name | Age | Moving from | | Ends | Date | Source |
|---|---|---|---|---|---|---|---|---|---|
| | F | (Hungary) | Norbert Lukács | 24 | Alba Fehérvár | (Hungary) | | 22 June 2022 | |
| | C | (Hungary) | Ádám Révész | 29–30 | Zalakerámia ZTE KK | (Hungary) | | 24 June 2022 | |
| | PF/C | (United States) | Andre Williamson | 35 | Manisa Belediye | (Turkey) | | 21 July 2022 | |
| | PG | (United States) | Jabril Durham | 31 | Fortitudo Bologna | (Italy) | | 25 July 2022 | |
| | PF | (United States) | Auston Barnes | 33 | Tramec Cento | (Italy) | | 27 July 2022 | |
| | | (Hungary) | József Tóth | | Youth system | | Promoted | | |
| | PG | (United States) | Jimmy Gavin | 33 | Donar | (Netherlands) | | 12 August 2022 | |

==== Out ====
| No. | Pos. | Nat. | Name | Age | Moving to | | Date | Source |
|---|---|---|---|---|---|---|---|---|
| 22 | F | (Hungary) | Péter Zsíros | 30 | Zalakerámia ZTE KK | (Hungary) | | |
| 6 | C | (Nigeria) | Samuel Taiwo | 24 | Atomerőmű SE | (Hungary) | | |
| 18 | SG | (Croatia) | Roko Badžim | 27 | Konyaspor | (Turkey) | | |
| 4 | C | (Croatia) | Marjan Čakarun | 35 | Egis Körmend | (Hungary) | | |
| 10 | SG | (Hungary) | Péter Kovács | 35 | NKA Pécs | (Hungary) | | |
| 2 | F | (United States) | Markeith Cummings | 36 | Élan Béarnais Pau-Orthez | (France) | | |
| 0 | G | (United States) | Brandon Young | 33 | CSKA Sofia | (Bulgaria) | | |

==== Out on loan ====
| No. | Pos. | Nat. | Name | Age | Moving to | Date | Source |

== Competitions ==
=== Overview ===
| Competition | First match | Last match | Starting round | Final position | Record | | | | | | | |
| Competition | First match | Last match | Starting round | Final position | Pld | W | D | L | PF | PA | PD | Win % |
|---|---|---|---|---|---|---|---|---|---|---|---|---|
| Nemzeti Bajnokság I/A | 1 October 2022 | TBD | Round 1 | TBD | 0 | 0 | 0 | 0 | 0 | 0 | +0 | — |
| Magyar Kupa | TBD | TBD | Semi-finals | TBD | 0 | 0 | 0 | 0 | 0 | 0 | +0 | — |
| Total | | | | | 0 | 0 | 0 | 0 | 0 | 0 | +0 | — |

Source: Competitions

=== Nemzeti Bajnokság I/A ===
==== Results summary ====
| Overall | | | | | | Home | | | | | Away | | | | |
| Pld | W | L | PF | PA | PD | W | L | PF | PA | PD | W | L | PF | PA | PD |
|---|---|---|---|---|---|---|---|---|---|---|---|---|---|---|---|
| 1 | 1 | 0 | 94 | 88 | +6 | 0 | 0 | 0 | 0 | 0 | 1 | 0 | 94 | 88 | +6 |

Source: Competitive matches

==== Results by round ====
| Round | 1 | 2 | 3 | 4 | 5 | 6 | 7 | 8 | 9 | 10 | 11 | 12 | 13 | 14 | 15 | 16 | 17 | 18 | 19 | 20 | 21 | 22 | 23 | 24 | 25 | 26 |
|---|---|---|---|---|---|---|---|---|---|---|---|---|---|---|---|---|---|---|---|---|---|---|---|---|---|---|
| Ground | A | H | A | H | A | A | H | A | H | A | H | H | A | H | A | H | A | H | H | A | H | A | H | A | A | H |
| Result | W | W | W | | | | | | | | | | | | | | | | | | | | | | | |
| Position | 6 | 1 | 2 | | | | | | | | | | | | | | | | | | | | | | | |

Source: Competitive matches
A = Away; H = Home; W = Win; L = Loss; R = Rest

==== Matches ====
| 1 October 2022 1 | Kometa Kaposvári KK | 88–94 | Szolnoki Olajbányász | Kaposvár |
| 18:00 | Scoring by quarter: 18–22, 22–27, 22–27, 26–18 |
| | Pts: Griffin 19; Rebs: Hughes, Hendlein 5 Asts: Petersen 5 PIR: Griffin, Krnjajski 20 | Boxscore | Pts: Gavin 17; Rebs: Williamson 9 Asts: Durham 7 PIR: Gavin, Williamson 23 | Arena: Kaposvár Aréna; Attendance: 1,800; Referees: Tamás Péter Földházi, Pál Attila Győrffy, József Ádám |

| 8 October 2022 2 | Szolnoki Olajbányász | 90–57 | Soproni KC | Szolnok |
| 18:00 | Scoring by quarter: 21–10, 28–17, 20–16, 21–14 |
| | Pts: Pallai 15; Rebs: Subotić 9 Asts: Durham 6 PIR: Subotić 22 | Boxscore | Pts:' Shine 14; Rebs: three players 4 Asts: Joseph 7 PIR: Shine 18 | Arena: Tiszaligeti Sportcsarnok; Attendance: 1,600; Referees: Zsolt Cziffra Csaba, Márton Makrai, László Pozsonyi |

| 12 October 2022 3 | HÜBNER Nyíregyháza BS | 81–87 | Szolnoki Olajbányász | Nyíregyháza |
| 18:00 | Scoring by quarter: 17–24, 26–16, 16–19, 22–28 |
| | Pts: Perry 30; Rebs: Hillsman, Williams 8 Asts: Perry 4 PIR: Perry 31 | Boxscore | Pts: Lukács 20; Rebs: Williamson 9 Asts: Durham 6 PIR: Subotić 23 | Arena: Continental Aréna; Attendance: 800; Referees: Dénes Kelemen Tőzsér, Tamás Söjtöry, Ádám József Lengyel |

| 25 October 2022 4 | Szolnoki Olajbányász | vs. | DEAC | Szolnok |
| 18:00 |
| | | [ Boxscore] | | Arena: Tiszaligeti Sportcsarnok |

| 21 October 2022 5 | Duna Aszfalt-DTKH Kecskemét | vs. | Szolnoki Olajbányász | Kecskemét |
| 18:00 |
| | | [ Boxscore] | | Arena: Messzi István Sportcsarnok |

| 29 October 2022 6 | Falco KC Szombathely | vs. | Szolnoki Olajbányász | Szombathely |
| 18:00 |
| | | [ Boxscore] | | Arena: Arena Savaria |

| 18 November 2022 7 | Szolnoki Olajbányász | vs. | Atomerőmű SE | Szolnok |
| 18:00 |
| | | [ Boxscore] | | Arena: Tiszaligeti Sportcsarnok |

| 23 November 2022 8 | MVM-OSE Lions | vs. | Szolnoki Olajbányász | Oroszlány |
| 18:00 |
| | | [ Boxscore] | | Arena: Krajnyik "Akác" András Sportcsarnok |

| 26 November 2022 9 | Szolnoki Olajbányász | vs. | Zalakerámia ZTE KK | Szolnok |
| 18:00 |
| | | [ Boxscore] | | Arena: Tiszaligeti Sportcsarnok |

| 2 December 2022 10 | Naturtex-SZTE-Szedeák | vs. | Szolnoki Olajbányász | Szeged |
| 18:00 |
| | | [ Boxscore] | | Arena: Városi Sportcsarnok |

===== Results overview =====
| Opposition | Home score | Away score | Double |
|---|---|---|---|
| Arconic-Alba Fehérvár | – | – | - |
| Atomerőmű SE | – | – | - |
| Budapesti Honvéd SE | – | – | - |
| DEAC | – | – | - |
| Falco KC Szombathely | – | – | - |
| Kometa Kaposvári KK | – | 88–94 | - |
| Duna Aszfalt-DTKH Kecskemét | – | – | - |
| Egis Körmend | – | – | - |
| MVM-OSE Lions | – | – | - |
| HÜBNER Nyíregyháza BS | – | 81–87 | - |
| Soproni KC | 90–57 | – | - |
| Naturtex-SZTE-Szedeák | – | – | - |
| Zalakerámia ZTE KK | – | – | - |
