= 2022–23 Falco KC Szombathely season =

Hungarian basketball season

Falco KC Szombathely
2022–23 season
- President: György Gráczer
- Head coach: (Slovenia) (Hungary) Milos Konakov
- Arena: Arena Savaria
- Nemzeti Bajnokság I/A: Pre-season
Home	Away

The 2022–23 season is Falco KC Szombathely's the 42nd in existence and the club's 31st consecutive season in the top tier of Hungarian basketball.

Times up to 30 October 2022 and from 26 March 2023 are CEST (UTC+2). Times from 30 October 2022 to 26 March 2023 are CET (UTC+1).

== Players ==
=== Transactions ===
==== In ====
No.	Pos.	Nat.	Name	Age	Moving from		Ends	Date	Source
5	PF	(United States)	Matthew Tiby	32	Giants Antwerp	(Belgium)	June 2023	29 July 2022	
22	F	(Hungary)	Marko Krivacsevics	28	Egis Körmend	(Hungary)	June 2023	29 July 2022	
3	SF	(United States)	Zach Brown	29	Hamburg Towers	(Germany)	June 2023	31 July 2022	
11	G/F	(United States)	Raymond Cowels	34	Legia Warsaw	(Poland)	June 2023	4 August 2022	
7	PG	(Serbia)	Stefan Pot	30	Kolossos Rodou	(Greece)	June 2023	7 August 2022	

==== Out ====
No.	Pos.	Nat.	Name	Age	Moving to		Date	Source
11	G/F	(Hungary)	Szilárd Benke	29	BCM Gravelines-Dunkerque	(France)	11 July 2022	
13	F	(United States)	Marvin Clark	30	Hamburg Towers	(Germany)	13 July 2022	
23	SF	(United States)	Deontae Hawkins	31				
10	CG	(Hungary)	Benedek Váradi	30	Rytas Vilnius	(Lithuania)		
14	PF/C	(Hungary)	György Golomán	28	Lietkabelis Panevėžys	(Lithuania)		
30	CG	(Hungary)	Ádám Somogyi	24	Alba Fehérvár	(Hungary)		

==== Out on loan ====
No.	Pos.	Nat.	Name	Age	Moving to	Date	Source

== Competitions ==
=== Overview ===
Competition	First match	Last match	Starting round	Final position	Record							
Competition	First match	Last match	Starting round	Final position	Pld	W	D	L	PF	PA	PD	Win %
Nemzeti Bajnokság I/A	1 October 2022	TBD	Round 1	TBD	0	0	0	0	0	0	+0	—
Magyar Kupa	TBD	TBD	Semi-finals	TBD	0	0	0	0	0	0	+0	—
Total					0	0	0	0	0	0	+0	—

Source: Competitions

=== Nemzeti Bajnokság I/A ===
==== Results summary ====
Overall						Home					Away				
Pld	W	L	PF	PA	PD	W	L	PF	PA	PD	W	L	PF	PA	PD
0	0	0	0	0	0	0	0	0	0	0	0	0	0	0	0

Source: Competitive matches

==== Results by round ====
Round	1	2	3	4	5	6	7	8	9	10	11	12	13	14	15	16	17	18	19	20	21	22	23	24	25	26	27
Ground	A	H	A	H	A	H	A	A	H	H	H	A	H														
Result																											
Position																											

Source: Competitive matches
A = Away; H = Home; W = Win; L = Loss; R = Rest

==== Matches ====
1 October 2022 1	Budapesti Honvéd SE	vs.	Falco KC Szombathely	Budapest
18:00
		[ Boxscore]		Arena: Ludovika Aréna

8 October 2022 2	Falco KC Szombathely	vs.	Kometa Kaposvári KK	Szombathely
18:00
		[ Boxscore]		Arena: Arena Savaria

19 October 2022 3	Soproni KC	vs.	Falco KC Szombathely	Sopron
19:00
		[ Boxscore]		Arena: NOVOMATIC Aréna

15 October 2022 4	Falco KC Szombathely	vs.	HÜBNER Nyíregyháza BS	Szombathely
18:00
		[ Boxscore]		Arena: Arena Savaria

22 October 2022 5	DEAC	vs.	Falco KC Szombathely	Debrecen
18:00
		[ Boxscore]		Arena: Oláh Gábor utcai Sportcsarnok

29 October 2022 6	Falco KC Szombathely	vs.	Szolnoki Olajbányász	Szombathely
18:00
		[ Boxscore]		Arena: Arena Savaria

18 November 2022 7	Duna Aszfalt-DTKH Kecskemét	vs.	Falco KC Szombathely	Kecskemét
18:00
		[ Boxscore]		Arena: Messzi István Sportcsarnok

23 November 2022 8	Atomerőmű SE	vs.	Falco KC Szombathely	Paks
18:00
		[ Boxscore]		Arena: ASE Sportcsarnok

30 November 2022 9	Falco KC Szombathely	vs.	MVM-OSE Lions	Szombathely
18:00
		[ Boxscore]		Arena: Arena Savaria

3 December 2022 10	Falco KC Szombathely	vs.	Zalakerámia ZTE KK	Szombathely
18:00
		[ Boxscore]		Arena: Arena Savaria

===== Results overview =====
Opposition	Home score	Away score	Double
Arconic-Alba Fehérvár	–	–	-
Atomerőmű SE	–	–	-
Budapesti Honvéd SE	–	–	-
DEAC	–	–	-
Kometa Kaposvári KK	–	–	-
Duna Aszfalt-DTKH Kecskemét	–	–	-
Egis Körmend	–	–	-
MVM-OSE Lions	–	–	-
HÜBNER Nyíregyháza BS	–	–	-
Soproni KC	–	–	-
Naturtex-SZTE-Szedeák	–	–	-
Szolnoki Olajbányász	–	–	-
Zalakerámia ZTE KK	–	–	-
