= 2022 Magyar Kupa (men's basketball) =

64th season of the Hungarian Basketball Cup

2022 Zsíros Tibor Magyar Kupa
Tournament details
- Arena: Főnix Aréna; Debrecen, Hungary
- Dates: 31 March – 2 April

Final positions
- Champions: Szolnoki Olaj KK (9th title)
- Runners-up: Szedeák
- Third place: Kecskeméti TE
- Fourth place: Alba Fehérvár

Awards and statistics
- MVP: (Croatia) Roko Badžim
- Top scorer(s): (United States) Xavier Pollard

The 2022 Tibor Zsíros Férfi Magyar Kupa was the 64th season of the Hungarian Basketball Cup. Roko Badžim was named Most Valuable Player.

== Qualification ==
Eight highest ranked teams after the first half of the 2021–22 NB I/A regular season qualified to the tournament.

1. Falco-Volvo Alpok Autó Szombathely
2. Szolnoki Olajbányász
3. DEAC-Tungsram
4. Duna Aszfalt-DTKH Kecskemét
5. Alba Fehérvár
6. Egis Körmend
7. HÜBNER Nyíregyháza BS
8. Naturtex-SZTE-Szedeák

== Bracket ==
Quarterfinals; March 31
Falco-Volvo Alpok Autó Szombathely	74
Naturtex-SZTE-Szedeák	78
DEAC-Tungsram	87
Alba Fehérvár	94
Egis Körmend	75
Szolnoki Olajbányász	96
HÜBNER Nyíregyháza BS	63
Duna Aszfalt-DTKH Kecskemét	77

Semifinals; April 1
Naturtex-SZTE-Szedeák	77
Alba Fehérvár	67
Szolnoki Olajbányász	92
Duna Aszfalt-DTKH Kecskemét	81

Final; April 2
Naturtex-SZTE-Szedeák	72
Szolnoki Olajbányász	100
Third place
Alba Fehérvár	78
Duna Aszfalt-DTKH Kecskemét	96

== Quarterfinals ==
31 March 2022	Falco-Volvo Alpok Autó Szombathely	74–78	Naturtex-SZTE-Szedeák	Debrecen
13:00 (CET)	Scoring by quarter: 19–23, 14–24, 15–18, 26–13
	Pts: Perl 31; Rebs: Váradi, Keller 8 Asts: Somogyi 5 PIR: Perl 33	Report	Pts: Bognár 23; Rebs: Bognár 9 Asts: Persons 6 PIR: Bognár 37	Arena: Főnix Aréna; Attendance: 350; Referees: Dénes Kelemen Tőzsér, László Pozsonyi, Attila Fodor

31 March 2022	DEAC-Tungsram	87–94	Alba Fehérvár	Debrecen
18:00 (CET)	Scoring by quarter: 21–21, 22–20, 20–36, 24–17
	Pts: Tóth 19; Rebs: Hagins 9 Asts: Hagins 6 PIR: Tóth 27	Report	Pts: Vojvoda 26; Rebs: Davis 6 Asts: Stark 4 PIR: Vojvoda 30	Arena: Főnix Aréna; Attendance: 900; Referees: Dr. Balázs Mészáros, László Goda, Róbert Török

31 March 2022	Egis Körmend	75–96	Szolnoki Olajbányász	Debrecen
18:00 (CET)	Scoring by quarter: 15–22, 19–19, 20–26, 21–29
	Pts: Stokes 20; Rebs: Gordon 9 Asts: Stokes 5 PIR: Stokes 25	Report	Pts: Badžim 17; Rebs: Cummings 4 Asts: Young 5 PIR: Badžim 22	Arena: Főnix Aréna; Attendance: 700; Referees: Pál Attila Győrffy, Péter Frányó, Viktor Nagy

31 March 2022	HÜBNER Nyíregyháza BS	63–77	Duna Aszfalt-DTKH Kecskemét	Debrecen
20:30 (CET)	Scoring by quarter: 20–27, 14–16, 16–18, 13–16
	Pts: Johnson 15; Rebs: Pipiras 6 Asts: Johnson, Pipiras 4 PIR: Johnson 16	Report	Pts: Klobučar 16; Rebs: Klobučar, Pollard 7 Asts: Klobučar 6 PIR: Klobučar 30	Arena: Főnix Aréna; Attendance: 300; Referees: Péter Árpád Praksch, László Balázs Minár, Nimród János Kovács

== Semifinals ==
1 April 2022	Naturtex-SZTE-Szedeák	77–67	Alba Fehérvár	Debrecen
15:00 (CET)	Scoring by quarter: 21–20, 15–17, 13–17, 28–13
	Pts: Alston 21; Rebs: Bognár 12; Asts: Persons 6 PIR: Alston 27	Report	Pts: Vojvoda 15; Rebs: Szabó 7 Asts: Pongó 7 PIR: Szabó 19	Arena: Főnix Aréna; Attendance: 300; Referees: Gellért Kapitány, József Ádám, Márton Makrai

1 April 2022	Szolnoki Olajbányász	92–81	Duna Aszfalt-DTKH Kecskemét	Debrecen
18:00 (CET)	Scoring by quarter: 9–19, 27–21, 26–14, 30–27
	Pts: Subotić 24; Rebs: Subotić 7 Asts: Pongó 8 PIR: Subotić 36	Report	Pts: Pollard 32; Rebs: Pollard 6 Asts: Klobučar, Milutinović 3 PIR: Pollard 39	Arena: Főnix Aréna; Attendance: 600; Referees: Péter Papp, Gábor Farkas, Tamás Ferenc Söjtöry

== Final ==
2 April 2022	Naturtex-SZTE-Szedeák	72–100	Szolnoki Olajbányász	Debrecen
19:30 (CET)	Scoring by quarter: 16–26, 19–26, 19–28, 18–20
M4 Sport+	Pts: Cook 18; Rebs: Alston, Cook 5 Asts: Persons 3 PIR: Cook 20	Report	Pts: Badžim 23; Rebs: Čakarun 10; Asts: Pongó 8 PIR: Badžim 29	Arena: Főnix Aréna; Attendance: 1,500; Referees: Tamás Benczur, Tamás Péter Földházi, Péter Praksch

Starters:			Pts	Reb	Ast
PG	2	(United States) Tayler Persons	17	3	3
SG	1	(United States) Keandre Cook	18	5	1
SF	11	(Hungary) Szilárd Balogh	0	2	1
PF	8	(Hungary) Kristóf Bognár	12	3	2
C	32	(United States) Justin Alston	5	5	1
Reserves:					
G	0	(United States) Rashun Davis	0	1	0
G/F	12	(Hungary) Iván Keller	9	2	1
G/F	15	(Hungary) Zsombor Szatmári	0	1	1
F	20	(Hungary) Ákos Mayer	2	0	0
C	21	(Hungary) Stefan Filipovic	5	1	0
F	31	(Hungary) Balázs Kerpel-Fronius	2	3	1
G	35	(Hungary) Kristóf Polányi	2	2	2
Head coach:
(Hungary) Árpád Simándi

Szedeák	Szolnoki Olajbányász

Szedeák	Statistics	Szolnok
22/37 (59.5%)	2-point field goals	17/24 (70.8%)
8/24 (33.3%)	3-point field goals	12/32 (37.5%)
21/29 (72%)	Free throws	16/18 (88.9%)
8	Offensive rebounds	12
20	Defensive rebounds	25
28	Total rebounds	37
13	Assists	16
8	Steals	3
	Turnovers	11
	Blocks	1

Starters:			Pts	Reb	Ast
PG	21	(Hungary) Máté Pongó	12	2	8
SG	18	(Croatia) Roko Badžim	27	0	7
SF	10	(Hungary) Péter Kovács	8	4	0
PF	11	(Montenegro) Bojan Subotić	16	4	1
C	6	(Nigeria) Samuel Taiwo	0	1	1
Reserves:					
G	0	(United States) Brandon Young	8	5	2
F	2	(United States) Markeith Cummings	17	4	0
G	3	(Hungary) Tamás Pallai	9	2	0
C	4	(Croatia) Marjan Čakarun	7	10	2
SF	7	(Hungary) Gábor Rudner	2	1	0
G/F	12	(Hungary) Bence Csornai	DNP		
SF	24	(Hungary) Erik Gilszki	DNP		
Head coach:
(Slovenia) Gašper Potočnik

2022 Magyar Kupa Winners
Szolnoki Olajbányász
(9th title)

== See also ==
- 2021–22 Nemzeti Bajnokság I/A
