= 2022–23 Alba Fehérvár season =

Hungarian basketball season

Arconic-Alba Fehérvár
2022–23 season
- President: Imre Balássy
- Head coach: GER Matthias Zollner
- Arena: Alba Regia Sportcsarnok
- Nemzeti Bajnokság I/A: Pre-season
Home	Away

The 2022–23 season is Alba Fehérvár (known as Arconic-Alba Fehérvár for sponsorship reasons) is the 73rd in existence and the club's 35th consecutive season in the top tier of Hungarian basketball.

Times up to 30 October 2022 and from 26 March 2023 are CEST (UTC+2). Times from 30 October 2022 to 26 March 2023 are CET (UTC+1).

== Players ==
=== Transactions ===
==== In ====
No.	Pos.	Nat.	Name	Age	Moving from		Ends	Date	Source
	CG	(Hungary)	Ádám Somogyi	25	Falco KC Szombathely	(Hungary)		15 July 2022	
	C	(United States)	Brandon Walters	30	APU Old Wild West Udine	(Italy)		24 July 2022	
	F	(United States)	Quincy Ford	32	Soproni KC	(Hungary)		30 July 2022	
	G/F	(United States)	Quenton DeCosey	30	Zalakerámia ZTE KK	(Hungary)		5 August 2022	
	CG	(United States)	Isaiah Philmore	35	Rouen Métropole Basket	(France)		10 August 2022	
	C	(United States)	Adam Kemp	34	Legia Warsaw	(Poland)		12 September 2022	

==== Out ====
No.	Pos.	Nat.	Name	Age	Moving to		Date	Source
13	F	(Hungary)	Norbert Lukács	24	Szolnoki Olajbányász	(Hungary)	11 July 2022	
23	C	(Nigeria)	Omenaka Godwin	24	Egis Körmend	(Hungary)	1 July 2022	
17	CG	(Hungary)	Balázs Kass	23	HÜBNER Nyíregyháza BS	(Hungary)		
1	F	(United States)	Shaheed Davis	31				
2	PG	(United States)	Jonathan Stark	30	Legia Warsaw	(Poland)		
10	PF	(United States)	Michael Fakuade	36	Al Ahly	(Egypt)		
32	G/F	(United States)	Lenzelle Smith	33				
	C	(United States)	Brandon Walters	30			29 August 2022	

==== Out on loan ====
No.	Pos.	Nat.	Name	Age	Moving to	Date	Source

== Competitions ==
=== Overview ===
Competition	First match	Last match	Starting round	Final position	Record							
Competition	First match	Last match	Starting round	Final position	Pld	W	D	L	PF	PA	PD	Win %
Nemzeti Bajnokság I/A	1 October 2022	TBD	Round 1	TBD	0	0	0	0	0	0	+0	—
Magyar Kupa	TBD	TBD	Semi-finals	TBD	0	0	0	0	0	0	+0	—
Total					0	0	0	0	0	0	+0	—

Source: Competitions

=== Nemzeti Bajnokság I/A ===
==== Results summary ====
Overall						Home					Away				
Pld	W	L	PF	PA	PD	W	L	PF	PA	PD	W	L	PF	PA	PD
0	0	0	0	0	0	0	0	0	0	0	0	0	0	0	0

Source: Competitive matches

==== Results by round ====
Round	1	2	3	4	5	6	7	8	9	10	11	12	13	14	15	16	17	18	19	20	21	22	23	24	25	26
Ground	A	H	A	H	A	H	H	A	H	A																
Result																										
Position																										

Source: Competitive matches
A = Away; H = Home; W = Win; L = Loss; R = Rest

==== Matches ====
30 September 2022 1	Kaposvári KK	vs.	Arconic-Alba Fehérvár	Paks
18:00
		[ Boxscore]		Arena: ASE Sportcsarnok

8 October 2022 2	Arconic-Alba Fehérvár	vs.	MVM-OSE Lions	Székesfehérvár
17:00
		[ Boxscore]		Arena: Alba Regia Sportcsarnok

12 October 2022 3	Zalakerámia ZTE KK	vs.	Arconic-Alba Fehérvár	Zalaegerszeg
18:00
		[ Boxscore]		Arena: Városi Sportcsarnok

15 October 2022 4	Arconic-Alba Fehérvár	vs.	Naturtex-SZTE-Szedeák	Székesfehérvár
17:00
		[ Boxscore]		Arena: Alba Regia Sportcsarnok

22 October 2022 5	Egis Körmend	vs.	Arconic-Alba Fehérvár	Körmend
18:00
		[ Boxscore]		Arena: Városi Sportcsarnok

29 October 2022 6	Arconic-Alba Fehérvár	vs.	Duna Aszfalt-DTKH Kecskemét	Székesfehérvár
17:00
		[ Boxscore]		Arena: Alba Regia Sportcsarnok

19 November 2022 7	Arconic-Alba Fehérvár	vs.	Budapesti Honvéd SE	Székesfehérvár
17:00
		[ Boxscore]		Arena: Alba Regia Sportcsarnok

23 November 2022 8	Kometa Kaposvári KK	vs.	Arconic-Alba Fehérvár	Kaposvár
18:00
		[ Boxscore]		Arena: Kaposvár Aréna

26 November 2022 9	Arconic-Alba Fehérvár	vs.	Soproni KC	Székesfehérvár
17:00
		[ Boxscore]		Arena: Alba Regia Sportcsarnok

2 December 2022 10	HÜBNER Nyíregyháza BS	vs.	Arconic-Alba Fehérvár	Nyíregyháza
18:00
		[ Boxscore]		Arena: Continental Aréna

===== Results overview =====
Opposition	Home score	Away score	Double
Atomerőmű SE	–	–	-
Budapesti Honvéd SE	–	–	-
DEAC	–	–	-
Falco KC Szombathely	–	–	-
Kometa Kaposvári KK	–	–	-
Duna Aszfalt-DTKH Kecskemét	–	–	-
Egis Körmend	–	–	-
MVM-OSE Lions	–	–	-
HÜBNER Nyíregyháza BS	–	–	-
Soproni KC	–	–	-
Naturtex-SZTE-Szedeák	–	–	-
Szolnoki Olajbányász	–	–	-
Zalakerámia ZTE KK	–	–	-
