= List of indoor arenas in Hungary =

The following is a list of indoor arenas in Hungary, ordered by capacity. Halls with a capacity of at least 1,000 people are listed.

== Arenas in use ==
Image	Stadium	Capacity	City	Team	Inaugurated
	MVM Dome	20,022	Budapest	Hungary men's national handball team Hungary women's national handball team	2021
	László Papp Budapest Sports Arena	12,500	Budapest	Hungary national ice hockey team	2003
	Főnix Hall	8,500	Debrecen		2002
	Pick Aréna	8 143 handball	Szeged	SC Pick Szeged	2021
	Alba Aréna	8,000 concerts 6,000 ice hockey	Székesfehérvár	SAPA Fehérvár AV19	2024
	Tatabánya Aréna	6,058	Tatabánya	Grundfos Tatabánya KC	2022
	Audi Aréna	5,654	Győr	Győri Audi ETO KC	2014
	BOK Hall (Hall "A")	5,200	Budapest		2006
	Veszprém Aréna	5,096	Veszprém	Telekom Veszprém	2008
	MTK Multifunctional Hall	4,900	Budapest	Magyar Testgyakorlók Köre	2025
	Tüskecsarnok	3,908	Budapest	MAC Budapest	2014
	Arena Savaria	3,500	Szombathely	Falco KC Szombathely	2006
	DVTK Aréna	3,500	Miskolc	Diósgyőri VTK	2021
	Ifjabb Ocskay Gábor Ice Hall	3,500	Székesfehérvár	Fehérvár AV19	1991
	Continental Aréna	3,328	Nyíregyháza	Nyíregyháza Blue Sharks; Fatum-Nyíregyháza; Nyíregyházi KC	1988
	Városi Sportcsarnok (Újszegedi Sportcsarnok)	3,200	Szeged	SZTE-Szedeák	1974
	Győr Városi Egyetemi Csarnok	3,036	Győr	UNI Győr; ETO-SZESE Győr FKC	2002
	Lauber Dezso Sports Hall	3,000	Pécs	PVSK Panthers; PEAC-Pécs	1976
	Kaposvár Aréna	3,000	Kaposvár	Kaposvári KK; Fino Kaposvár SE	2019
	Kanizsa Aréna	3,000	Nagykanizsa		2021
	Városi Sportcsarnok	3,000	Szigetszentmiklós	Szigetszentmiklósi KSK; Szigetszentmiklósi NKSE	2012
	Magvassy Mihály Sportcsarnok	2,800	Győr	Győri ETO Futsal Club; VKLSE Győr	1976
	Körcsarnok	2,550	Budapest		1975
	Alba Regia Sportcsarnok	2,500	Székesfehérvár	Alba Fehérvár	1978
	Városi Sportcsarnok	2,500	Zalaegerszeg	ZTE KK; ZTE NKK	1980
	OBO Aréna	2,500	Dabas	Dabas KK	2004
	Aréna Sopron	2,500	Sopron	Sopron Basket; Soproni KC	1987
	Városi Sportcsarnok	2,300	Békéscsaba	Békéscsabai Előre NKSE; Békéscsabai RSE	1988
	Érd Aréna	2,300	Érd	Érd HC	2013
	Tiszaligeti Sportcsarnok	2,300	Szolnok	Szolnoki Olajbányász; Szolnoki RK	1975
	Március 15. úti Sportcsarnok	2,200	Veszprém	Veszprém KKFT Felsőörs; Futsal Club Veszprém	
	Miskolc Ice Hall	2,200	Miskolc	DVTK Jegesmedvék	2006
	Megyeri úti Ice Hall	2,200	Budapest	Újpesti TE	1964
	Városi Sportcsarnok	2,000	Körmend	BC Körmend; Körmendi DMTE	
	Gerevich Aladár National Sports Hall	1,900	Budapest		1941
	Hódos Imre Sports Hall	1,848	Debrecen	Debreceni VSC	1976
	Generali Aréna	1,800	Miskolc		1970
	Városi Sportcsarnok	1,763	Salgótarján	Salgótarjáni KSE; Salgótarjáni SKC	1976
	Messzi István Sportcsarnok	1,600	Kecskemét	Kecskeméti TE (basketball); Kecskeméti TE (handball); Kecskeméti NKSE; Kecskeméti RC; SG Kecskemét Futsal	1970
	Városi Sportcsarnok	1,600	Pápa	Pápai KC	1999
	ASE Sportcsarnok	1,520	Paks	Atomerőmű SE	1986
	Városi Sportcsarnok	1,500	Gyöngyös	Gyöngyösi KK	
	Kaposvári sportcsarnok	1,500	Kaposvár		1983
	Hódtói Sportcsarnok	1,500	Hódmezővásárhely	Vásárhelyi KS; Hódmezővásárhelyi KE; Hódmezővásárhelyi LKC	1993
	KÉSZ Aréna	1,500	Kiskunfélegyháza	Kiskunfélegyházi HTK; Kiskunfélegyházi KC	2005
	Riz Levente Sport- és Rendezvényközpont	1,500	Budapest	Ferencvárosi TC Men's Handball; Rákosmenti KSK; MTK Handball	2022
	Oláh Gábor utcai Sportcsarnok	1,490	Debrecen	Debreceni EAC (basketball)	1978
	Sportmax 2	1,475	Budapest		2008
	Krajnyik „Akác” András Sportcsarnok	1,465	Oroszlány	OSE Lions	2016
	Kiss Szilárd Sportcsarnok	1,400	Siófok	Siófok KC	2018
	Ludovika Aréna	1,320	Budapest	NKE-Csata	2018
	Elek Gyula Aréna	1,300	Budapest	Ferencvárosi TC (women's handball)	1997
	MNÁMK Sportcsarnok	1,250	Baja	Bajai Bácska FKE	
	Gál János Sportcsarnok	1,200	Cegléd	Ceglédi KKSE; Ceglédi EKK	1983
	Városi Sportcsarnok	1,200	Dunaújváros	Dunaújvárosi Kohász KA; DF Green Pet Futsal Club; Dunaferr SE	1973
	Simon János Sportcsarnok	1,200	Budapest	Budapesti Honvéd SE (men's basketball)	
	Városi Sportközpont	1,100	Szekszárd	KSC Szekszárd; Szekszárdi FGKC	1989
	Pestszentimrei Sportkastély	1,100	Budapest	PLER KC	2006
	UFM Aréna	1,100	Mosonmagyaróvár	Mosonmagyaróvári KC SE; Mosonmagyaróvári TE (futsal)	2017
	Városi Sportcsarnok	1,000	Budaörs	Moyra-Budaörs Handball; Budai Farkasok KKUK	2010
	Földi Imre Sportcsarnok	1,000	Tatabánya	Tatabánya KC; Tatabányai SC	1970
	Köfém Sportcsarnok	1,000	Székesfehérvár	Alba Fehérvár KC	
	Sport11	1,000	Budapest		
	Kemény Ferenc Sportcsarnok	1,000	Eger	Eszterházy SC (handball)	2017
	Városi Sportcsarnok	1,000	Ózd	Ózdi KC; Ózdi VSE	

== Projects ==
Arena	Planned capacity	City	County	Home team	To be opened
Sportcsarnok	3,000	Zalaegerszeg	Zala		under planning

== See also ==
- List of indoor arenas in Europe
- List of indoor arenas by capacity
