= 2021–22 Nemzeti Bajnokság I/A (men's basketball) =

Tippmix Férfi NB I/A^{1}
- Season: 2021–22
- Dates: 21 September 2021 – 26 June 2022
- Teams: 14
- TV partner: M4 Sport

Regular season
- Top seed: Falco-Volvo Alpok Autó Szombathely
- Relegated: Pécsi VSK-VEOLIA

Finals
- Champions: Falco-Volvo Alpok Autó Szombathely (4th title)
- Runners-up: Egis Körmend
- Third place: Alba Fehérvár
- Fourth place: Duna Aszfalt-DTKH Kecskemét
- ^{1} Sponsored league name, referring to Tippmix.

The 2021–22 Nemzeti Bajnokság I/A season, also known as Tippmix Férfi NB I/A for sponsorship reasons, is the 91st season of the Nemzeti Bajnokság I/A, the highest professional basketball league in Hungary. Falco Vulcano is the defending champion. It started on 21 September 2021 with the first round of the regular season and will end on 26 June 2022 with the last game of the finals.

== Teams ==
Location of teams in 2021–22 Nemzeti Bajnokság I/A

=== Team changes ===
Promoted from Nemzeti Bajnokság I/B	Relegated from Nemzeti Bajnokság I/A
HÜBNER Nyíregyháza Blue Sharks	Jászberényi KSE

=== Arenas and locations ===
Team	City	Arena	Capacity	2020–21
Alba Fehérvár	Székesfehérvár	Alba Regia Sportcsarnok	1,850	5th
Atomerőmű SE	Paks	ASE Sportcsarnok	1,560	6th
DEAC	Debrecen	Oláh Gábor utcai Sportcsarnok	1,500	4th
Falco KC Szombathely	Szombathely	Arena Savaria	3,500	1st
Kaposvári KK	Kaposvár	Kaposvár Aréna	2,931	12th
Kecskeméti TE	Kecskemét	Messzi István Sportcsarnok	1,851	9th
BC Körmend	Körmend	Városi Sportcsarnok	2,002	7th
OSE Lions	Oroszlány	Krajnyik András Sportcsarnok	1,400	10th
Nyíregyháza Blue Sharks	Nyíregyháza	Continental Aréna	3,328	1st (NB I/B - Red)
PVSK Panthers	Pécs	Lauber Dezső Sportcsarnok	3,548	11th
Soproni KC	Sopron	Novomatic Aréna	1,250	8th
SZTE-Szedeák	Szeged	Városi Sportcsarnok	3,017	3rd
Szolnoki Olajbányász	Szolnok	Tiszaligeti Sportcsarnok	2,122	2nd
Zalaegerszegi TE	Zalaegerszeg	Városi Sportcsarnok	2,210	13th

=== Personnel and kits ===
All teams are obligated to have the logo of the Hungarian national sports betting brand Tippmix sponsor. Their logo is therefore present on all team kits.

Team	Head coach	Captain	Kit manufacturer	Main sponsor
Alba Fehérvár	(Austria) Matthias Zollner		Hummel	Endo Plus Service
Atomerőmű SE	(Czech Republic) Jan Pavlík	(Hungary) Ákos Kovács	Adidas	Atomerőmű
DEAC	(Hungary) Sándor Berényi	(Hungary) László Polyák	Adidas	Tungsram
Falco KC Szombathely	(Slovenia) Miloš Konakov	(Hungary) Benedek Váradi	Spalding	Vulcano energia,
Kaposvári KK	(Serbia) Nikola Lazić	(Hungary) Roland Hendlein	Zeus	Kaposvár
Kecskeméti TE	(Hungary) Gábor Forray		Ziccer	Duna Aszfalt
BC Körmend	(Cyprus) Antonis Constantinides	(Hungary) Csaba Ferencz	Zeus	Egis
OSE Lions	(Slovenia) Sebastjan Krašovec		DRK	MVM, Pon-go Bridgestone
Nyíregyháza Blue Sharks	(Hungary) Ákos Pethő		Jako	Hübner
PVSK Panthers	(Croatia) Dražen Brajković		McNut	Veolia, Terra21
Soproni KC	(Greece) Kostas Flevarakis		DRK	Sopron
SZTE-Szedeák	(Hungary) Árpád Simándi		Toti Sport	Naturtex, Szeged
Szolnoki Olajbányász	(Slovenia) Gašper Potočnik		Spalding	Duna Aszfalt
Zalaegerszegi TE	(Bosnia and Herzegovina) Emir Mutapčić		Spalding	Zalakerámia, HunGast

=== Managerial changes ===
Team	Outgoing manager	Manner of departure	Date of vacancy	Position in table	Replaced by	Date of appointment	Ref.
Zalaegerszegi TE	(Hungary) Róbert Heinrich	End of caretaker spell	26 April 2021	Pre-season	(Croatia) Teo Čizmić	26 April 2021	
DEAC	(Serbia) Anđelko Mandić	End of caretaker spell	7 June 2021	Pre-season	(Serbia) Milenko Topić	7 June 2021	
Alba Fehérvár	(Hungary) Gábor Forray	Sacked	15 June 2021	Pre-season	(Slovenia) Dejan Mihevc	15 June 2021	
Nyíregyháza Blue Sharks	(Serbia) Boris Maljković	End of contract	18 June 2021	Pre-season	(Hungary) Ákos Pethő	16 June 2021	
Falco KC Szombathely	(Slovenia) Gašper Okorn	Resigned	18 June 2021	Pre-season	(Slovenia) (Hungary) Milos Konakov	18 June 2021	
Kecskeméti TE	(Hungary) Kornél Váradi	Signed by Hungary men's U18	19 October 2021	5th	(Hungary) Gábor Forray	19 October 2021	
SZTE-Szedeák	(Serbia) Srećko Sekulović	Resigned	8 November 2021	10th	(Hungary) Árpád Simándi	8 November 2021	
DEAC	(Serbia) Milenko Topić	Resigned	13 November 2021	5th	(Greece) Georgios Vovoras	18 November 2021	
Soproni KC	(Serbia) (Hungary) Branislav Dzunić	Mutual consent	15 November 2021	12th	(Greece) Kostas Flevarakis	21 November 2021	
Alba Fehérvár	(Slovenia) Dejan Mihevc	Sacked	19 November 2021	11th	(Austria) Matthias Zollner	19 November 2021	
Zalaegerszegi TE	(Croatia) Teo Čizmić	Sacked	23 November 2021	13th	(Bosnia and Herzegovina) Emir Mutapčić	23 November 2021	
Atomerőmű SE	(Slovenia) Teo Hojč	Sacked	24 November 2021	14th	(Montenegro) Petar Mijović	27 November 2021	
PVSK Panthers	(Serbia) Dragan Aleksić	Sacked	20 December 2021	12th	(Serbia) (Montenegro) Andrija Ćirić	27 November 2021	
DEAC	(Greece) Georgios Vovoras	Sacked	7 February 2022	6th	(Hungary) Sándor Berényi	7 February 2022	
Atomerőmű SE	(Montenegro) Petar Mijović	Mutual consent	14 March 2022	14th	(Czech Republic) Jan Pavlík	14 March 2022	
PVSK Panthers	(Serbia) (Montenegro) Andrija Ćirić	Mutual consent	19 April 2022	14th	(Croatia) Dražen Brajković	19 April 2022	

== Regular season ==
=== League table ===
Pos	Team	Pld	W	L	PF	PA	PD	Pts	Qualification
1	Falco-Volvo Alpok Autó Szombathely	26	23	3	2288	1948	+340	49	Qualification for 1st–5th placement matches
2	Szolnoki Olajbányász	26	18	8	2068	1976	+92	44	Qualification for 1st–5th placement matches
3	Egis Körmend	26	15	11	2164	2099	+65	41	Qualification for 1st–5th placement matches
4	Alba Fehérvár	26	15	11	2246	2252	−6	41	Qualification for 1st–5th placement matches
5	Soproni KC	26	15	11	2153	2135	+18	41	Qualification for 1st–5th placement matches
6	Kaposvári KK	26	14	12	2071	2042	+29	40	Qualification for 6th–10th placement matches
7	DEAC-Tungsram	26	13	13	2142	2101	+41	39	Qualification for 6th–10th placement matches
8	Duna Aszfalt-DTKH Kecskemét	26	13	13	2071	2165	−94	39	Qualification for 6th–10th placement matches
9	Naturtex-SZTE-Szedeák	26	12	14	2224	2196	+28	38	Qualification for 6th–10th placement matches
10	MVM-OSE Lions	26	11	15	1981	2005	−24	37	Qualification for 6th–10th placement matches
11	Zalakerámia ZTE KK	26	9	17	2003	2103	−100	35	Qualification for 11th–14th placement matches
12	HÜBNER Nyíregyháza BS	26	9	17	2185	2282	−97	35	Qualification for 11th–14th placement matches
13	Pécsi VSK-VEOLIA	26	8	18	2090	2266	−176	34	Qualification for 11th–14th placement matches
14	Atomerőmű SE	26	7	19	2068	2184	−116	33	Qualification for 11th–14th placement matches

Updated to match(es) played on 2 April 2022. Source: Kosarsport.hu
Rules for classification: 1) Games played; 2) Points; 3) Wins; 4) Defeats; 5) Points scored; 6) Points against; 7) Victories/Defeats series; 8) in Home games; 9) as a Guest; 10) Last 5 matches.

=== Schedule and results ===
In the table below the home teams are listed on the left and the away teams along the top.

Home \ Away	ALBA	ASE	DEAC	FAL	KAP	KTE	KÖR	OSE	NYÍR	PVSK	SOP	SZEG	SZOL	ZTE
Alba Fehérvár	—	73–85	80–90	66–98	96–92	91–93	77–76	85–82	93–78	103–68	80–83	90–81	81–88	103–93
Atomerőmű SE	104–106	—	80–74	65–82	64–81	76–80	106–87	73–82	82–73	89–66	82–83	84–90	67–90	72–80
DEAC	88–73	90–82	—	90–88	82–80	86–93	76–89	79–59	79–65	102–79	79–72	79–97	63–74	88–66
Falco KC Szombathely	91–93	98–78	80–70	—	85–70	97–76	79–73	81–73	109–79	99–77	95–64	93–72	82–69	86–73
Kaposvári KK	97–82	74–90	96–91	61–67	—	77–61	87–61	63–68	86–78	82–75	67–76	90–77	75–80	72–65
Kecskeméti TE	83–86	81–71	85–94	83–87	62–74	—	93–67	74–72	101–99	91–89	91–71	100–86	74–81	68–65
BC Körmend	91–83	75–76	89–73	78–86	89–70	105–78	—	77–65	107–99	84–71	84–77	97–74	82–93	85–71
OSE Lions	79–86	86–65	79–74	55–73	74–83	89–80	72–78	—	80–74	73–61	72–80	90–83	69–70	86–84
Nyíregyháza Blue Sharks	105–79	83–74	62–89	77–90	90–82	75–77	95–94	92–81	—	104–110	81–88	86–81	84–92	76–78
PVSK Panthers	103–99	69–67	63–88	77–88	88–97	95–74	80–84	61–71	93–85	—	87–93	93–115	81–89	77–68
Soproni KC	82–95	109–107	100–75	90–83	92–94	72–75	85–75	86–80	82–90	70–76	—	95–77	83–78	77–54
SZTE-Szedeák	78–89	100–79	100–98	75–91	75–76	102–67	70–82	64–73	86–84	106–95	100–83	—	81–57	93–75
Szolnoki Olajbányász	71–74	84–63	79–78	69–84	94–68	81–63	83–71	90–86	85–86	80–78	73–76	77–76	—	63–74
Zalaegerszegi TE	73–83	88–87	91–67	95–96	80–77	77–68	80–84	89–85	84–85	65–78	85–84	73–85	77–78	—

Updated to match(es) played on 2 April 2022. Source: Results
Legend: Blue = home team win; Red = away team win.
Matches with lighter background shading were decided after overtime.

== Second round ==
=== 1st–5th Placement matches ===
Pos	Team	Pld	W	L	PF	PA	PD	Pts	Qualification
1	Falco-Volvo Alpok Autó Szombathely	34	29	5	2984	2552	+432	63	Advance to playoffs
2	Szolnoki Olajbányász	34	21	13	2724	2648	+76	55	Advance to playoffs
3	Egis Körmend	34	20	14	2809	2751	+58	54	Advance to playoffs
4	Soproni KC	34	18	16	2796	2835	−39	52	Advance to playoffs
5	Alba Fehérvár	34	18	16	2927	2945	−18	52	Advance to playoffs

Source: Kosarsport.hu
Rules for classification: 1) Games played; 2) Points; 3) Wins; 4) Defeats; 5) Points for; 6) Points against; 7) Victories/Defeats series; 8) in Home games; 9) as a Guest; 10) Last 5 matches.

==== Results ====
Home \ Away	ALBA	FAL	KÖR	SOP	SZOL
Alba Fehérvár	—	89–94	97–77	85–89	98–85
Falco KC Szombathely	96–72	—	84–72	102–56	89–74
BC Körmend	90–80	85–72	—	86–79	75–69
Soproni KC	83–75	70–81	89–90	—	97–90
Szolnoki Olajbányász	79–85	86–78	82–70	91–80	—

Updated to match(es) played on 11 May 2022. Source: Results
Legend: Blue = home team win; Red = away team win.
Matches with lighter background shading were decided after overtime.

=== 6th–10th Placement matches ===
Pos	Team	Pld	W	L	PF	PA	PD	Pts	Qualification
6	MVM-OSE Lions	34	18	16	2707	2647	+60	52	Advance to playoffs
7	Duna Aszfalt-DTKH Kecskemét	34	18	16	2708	2815	−107	52	Advance to playoffs
8	Naturtex-SZTE-Szedeák	34	17	17	2915	2866	+49	51	Advance to playoffs
9	Kaposvári KK	34	16	18	2741	2740	+1	50	
10	DEAC-Tungsram	34	14	20	2779	2802	−23	48	

Source: Kosarsport.hu
Rules for classification: 1) Games played; 2) Points; 3) Wins; 4) Defeats; 5) Points for; 6) Points against; 7) Victories/Defeats series; 8) in Home games; 9) as a Guest; 10) Last 5 matches.

==== Results ====
Home \ Away	DEAC	KAP	KTE	OSE	SZEG
DEAC	—	65–93	72–77	83–86	79–80
Kaposvári KK	82–91	—	77–80	93–85	88–96
Kecskeméti TE	90–82	92–89	—	78–80	87–80
OSE Lions	102–83	101–73	84–62	—	103–91
SZTE-Szedeák	91–82	88–75	86–71	79–85	—

Updated to match(es) played on 11 May 2022. Source: Results
Legend: Blue = home team win; Red = away team win.
Matches with lighter background shading were decided after overtime.

=== 11th–14th Placement matches ===
Pos	Team	Pld	W	L	PF	PA	PD	Pts	Qualification
11	HÜBNER Nyíregyháza BS	32	13	19	2634	2736	−102	45	
12	Zalakerámia ZTE KK	32	13	19	2478	2556	−78	45	
13	Atomerőmű SE	32	11	21	2540	2616	−76	43	Qualification for Relegation play-out
14	Pécsi VSK-VEOLIA	32	8	24	2539	2772	−233	40	Qualification for Relegation play-out

Source: Kosarsport.hu
Rules for classification: 1) Games played; 2) Points; 3) Wins; 4) Defeats; 5) Points scored; 6) Points against; 7) Victories/Defeats series; 8) in Home games; 9) as a Guest; 10) Last 5 matches.

==== Results ====
Home \ Away	ASE	NYÍR	PVSK	ZTE
Atomerőmű SE	—	77–53	82–66	69–78
Nyíregyháza Blue Sharks	67–73	—	78–73	73–63
PVSK Panthers	81–90	86–91	—	60–79
Zalaegerszegi TE	87–81	82–87	86–83	—

Updated to match(es) played on 11 April 2022. Source: Results
Legend: Blue = home team win; Red = away team win.
Matches with lighter background shading were decided after overtime.

== Relegation play-out ==
Team 1	Series	Team 2	Game 1	Game 2	Game 3
Atomerőmű SE	2–1	Pécsi VSK-VEOLIA	95–77	71–73	75–70

== Playoffs ==
All three rounds (except Third place series) of the playoffs were played in a best-of-five format, with the higher seeded team playing the first, third and fifth (if it was necessary) game at home.

Quarterfinals
1	Falco-Volvo Alpok Autó Szombathely	3
8	Naturtex-SZTE-Szedeák	1
4	Soproni KC	0
5	Alba Fehérvár	3
2	Szolnoki Olajbányász	1
7	Duna Aszfalt-DTKH Kecskemét	3
3	Egis Körmend	3
6	MVM-OSE Lions	1

Semifinals
1	Falco-Volvo Alpok Autó Szombathely	3
5	Alba Fehérvár	1
7	Duna Aszfalt-DTKH Kecskemét	2
3	Egis Körmend	3

Finals
1	Falco-Volvo Alpok Autó Szombathely	3
3	Egis Körmend	2
Third place
5	Alba Fehérvár	2
7	Duna Aszfalt-DTKH Kecskemét	0

=== Quarterfinals ===
Team 1	Series	Team 2	Game 1	Game 2	Game 3	Game 4	Game 5
Falco-Volvo Alpok Autó Szombathely	3–1	Naturtex-SZTE-Szedeák	105–86	74–80	96–74	87–79	–
Szolnoki Olajbányász	1–3	Duna Aszfalt-DTKH Kecskemét	75–86	72–83	95–89	80–79	–
Egis Körmend	3–1	MVM-OSE Lions	74–90	91–86	84–71	86–72	–
Soproni KC	0–3	Alba Fehérvár	90–91	87–72	85–92	–	–

=== Semifinals ===
Team 1	Series	Team 2	Game 1	Game 2	Game 3	Game 4	Game 5
Falco-Volvo Alpok Autó Szombathely	3–1	Alba Fehérvár	88–78	74–72	83–85	100–98	–
Egis Körmend	3–2	Duna Aszfalt-DTKH Kecskemét	86–74	67–73	86–80	76–81	83–80

=== Finals ===
Team 1	Series	Team 2	Game 1	Game 2	Game 3	Game 4	Game 5
Falco-Volvo Alpok Autó Szombathely	3–2	Egis Körmend	86–76	68–69	78–81	77–62	99–70

==== Game 1 ====
15 June 2022	Falco-Volvo Alpok Autó Szombathely	86–76 (Series: 1–0)	Egis Körmend	Szombathely
19:00 (CEST)	Scoring by quarter: 16–13, 26–23, 22–22, 22–18
M4 Sport	Pts: Perl 28; Rebs: Váradi 6 Asts: Váradi 8 PIR: Perl 32	Report	Pts: Durázi 17; Rebs: Gordon 13; Asts: White 5 PIR: Gordon 30	Arena: Arena Savaria; Attendance: 3,070; Referees: Tamás Benczur, Péter Papp, Ferenc Tamás

==== Game 2 ====
18 June 2022	Egis Körmend	69–68 (Series: 1–1)	Falco-Volvo Alpok Autó Szombathely	Körmend
15:15 (CEST)	Scoring by quarter: 9–13, 19–19, 20–18, 21–18
M4 Sport+	Pts: Gordon 21; Rebs: Gordon 11; Asts: White 8 PIR: Gordon 37	Report	Pts: Váradi 15; Rebs: Keller 9 Asts: seven players 2 PIR: Váradi 19	Arena: Városi Sportcsarnok; Attendance: 2,000; Referees: Csaba Zsolt Cziffra, Péter Árpád Praksch, Péter Frányó

==== Game 3 ====
21 June 2022	Falco-Volvo Alpok Autó Szombathely	78–81 (Series: 1–2)	Egis Körmend	Szombathely
18:30 (CEST)	Scoring by quarter: 23–20, 19–13, 19–23, 17–25
Duna World	Pts: Barać 14; Rebs: Benke 6 Asts: Somogyi 6 PIR: Benke 20	Report	Pts: Gordon 16; Rebs: Gordon 8 Asts: White 9 PIR: White 29	Arena: Arena Savaria; Attendance: 3,070; Referees: Gellért Kapitány, Pál Attila Győrffy, József Ádám

==== Game 4 ====
24 June 2022	Egis Körmend	62–77 (Series: 2–2)	Falco-Volvo Alpok Autó Szombathely	Körmend
18:30 (CEST)	Scoring by quarter: 22–21, 15–19, 7–22, 18–15
Duna World	Pts: White 17; Rebs: Gordon 8 Asts: Gordon 3 PIR: Gordon 28	Report	Pts: Barać 17; Rebs: Benke 7 Asts: Benke 4 PIR: Benke, Barać 21	Arena: Városi Sportcsarnok; Attendance: 2,100; Referees: Tamás Benczur, Tamás Péter Földházi, Péter Papp

==== Game 5 ====
26 June 2022	Falco-Volvo Alpok Autó Szombathely	99–70 (Series: 3–2)	Egis Körmend	Szombathely
18:30 (CEST)	Scoring by quarter: 27–18, 28–16, 20–11, 24–25
M4 Sport	Pts: Somogyi 22; Rebs: Somogyi 7 Asts: Benke 5 PIR: Somogyi 30	Report	Pts: Gordon 13; Rebs: Gordon 8 Asts: three players 3 PIR: Henry 16	Arena: Arena Savaria; Attendance: 3,070; Referees: Csaba Zsolt Cziffra, Péter Árpád Praksch, Tamás Ferenc Söjtöry

=== Third place series ===
The Third place series were played best-of-three format, with the higher seeded team playing the first and third (if it was necessary) game at home.

Team 1	Series	Team 2	Game 1	Game 2	Game 3
Alba Fehérvár	2–0	Duna Aszfalt-DTKH Kecskemét	90–70	88–71	–

== Final standings ==
Pos	Team	Pld	W	L	Qualification or relegation
1	Falco-Volvo Alpok Autó Szombathely (C)	47	38	9	Qualification to Champions League regular season
2	Egis Körmend	48	28	20	Qualification to Champions League qualifying rounds
3	Alba Fehérvár	43	24	19	
4	Duna Aszfalt-DTKH Kecskemét	45	23	22	
5	Szolnoki Olajbányász	38	22	16	
6	Soproni KC	37	18	19	
7	MVM-OSE Lions	38	19	19	
8	Naturtex-SZTE-Szedeák	38	18	20	
9	Kaposvári KK	34	16	18	
10	DEAC-Tungsram	34	14	20	
11	HÜBNER Nyíregyháza BS	32	13	19	
12	Zalakerámia ZTE KK	32	13	19	
13	Atomerőmű SE	35	13	22	
14	Pécsi VSK-VEOLIA (R)	35	9	26	Relegation to Nemzeti Bajnokság I/B

Source: MKOSZ
(C) Champions; (R) Relegated

== Statistics ==
=== Number of teams by counties and regions ===
Number of teams by counties
Pos.	County (megye)	No. of teams	Teams
1	Vas	2	Falco KC Szombathely and BC Körmend
2	Baranya	1	PVSK Panthers
2	Bács-Kiskun	1	Kecskeméti TE
2	Csongrád-Csanád	1	SZTE-Szedeák
2	Fejér	1	Alba Fehérvár
2	Győr-Moson-Sopron	1	Soproni KC
2	Hajdú-Bihar	1	DEAC
2	Jász-Nagykun-Szolnok	1	Szolnoki Olajbányász
2	Komárom-Esztergom	1	OSE Lions
2	Somogy	1	Kaposvári KK
2	Szabolcs-Szatmár-Bereg	1	Nyíregyháza Blue Sharks
2	Tolna	1	Atomerőmű SE
2	Zala	1	Zalaegerszegi TE

Number of teams by regions
Transdanubia	Great Plain and North
Alba Fehérvár; Atomerőmű SE; Falco KC Szombathely; Kaposvári KK; BC Körmend; OSE Lions; PVSK Panthers; Soproni KC; Zalaegerszegi TE	DEAC; Nyíregyháza Blue Sharks; Kecskeméti TE; SZTE-Szedeák; Szolnoki Olajbányász
9 Team	5 Team

== Hungarian clubs in European competitions ==
	Competition	Team	Progress	Result	Total W–L
FIBA					
FIBA	Champions; League	Falco Vulcano	Second round	4th of 4 teams (1–5)	6-6
FIBA	Champions; League	Falco Vulcano	Regular season	1st of 4 teams (5–1)	6-6
FIBA	Europe Cup	Szolnoki Olajbányász	Regular season	4th of 4 teams (1–5)	1–5
FIBA	Europe Cup	Naturtex-SZTE Szedeák	Qualification semifinal	vs (Germany) Medi Bayreuth (L)	1-1
FIBA	Europe Cup	Naturtex-SZTE Szedeák	Qualification quarterfinal	vs (North Macedonia) TFT Skopje (W)	1-1

== See also ==
- 2022 Magyar Kupa
