= 2017–18 Alba Fehérvár season =

2017-18 Alba Fehérvár
- Season: 2017–18
- Duration: TBD
- TV partners: M4 Sport, BasketballCL Youtube, Digi Sport

The 2017–18 Alba Fehérvár is the 69th season of Alba Fehérvár in the highest tier professional basketball league, NB I/A in Hungary.

== Team ==
=== Current roster ===
Note: Flags indicate national team eligibility at FIBA-sanctioned events. Players may hold other non-FIBA nationalities not displayed.

Alba Fehérvár roster
Players
Coaches

| Pos. | No. | Nat. | Name | Ht. | Wt. | Age |
|---|---|---|---|---|---|---|
| C | 6 | (Hungary) | Keller, Ákos | 2.08 m (6 ft 10 in) | 104 kg (229 lb) | 37 – 28 March 1989 |
| SF | 22 | (Hungary) | Nshimba, Joel (injured) | 2.00 m (6 ft 7 in) | 86 kg (190 lb) | 28 – 4 March 1998 |
| SF | 10 | (Hungary) | Markovic, Luka | 1.98 m (6 ft 6 in) | 98 kg (216 lb) | 32 – 4 September 1993 |
| PG | 11 | (Hungary) | Tóth, Péter (injured) | 1.99 m (6 ft 6 in) | 88 kg (194 lb) | 38 – 4 March 1988 |
| SF | 12 | (Hungary) | Keller, Iván | 1.98 m (6 ft 6 in) | 85 kg (187 lb) | 31 – 8 March 1995 |
| PF | 44 | (Hungary) | Lóránt, Péter (C) | 2.06 m (6 ft 9 in) | 105 kg (231 lb) | 40 – 23 October 1985 |
| SG | 25 | (Hungary) | Varga, Máté | 1.89 m (6 ft 2 in) | 75 kg (165 lb) | 28 – 13 September 1997 |
| PG | 8 | (Hungary) | Kovács, Ákos | 1.83 m (6 ft 0 in) | 80 kg (176 lb) | 37 – 16 August 1988 |
| PG | 4 | (United States) | Hill, Kasey | 1.85 m (6 ft 1 in) | 79 kg (174 lb) | 32 – 3 December 1993 |
| SG | 15 | (United States) | Fenner, DJ | 1.98 m (6 ft 6 in) | 93 kg (205 lb) | 32 – 7 December 1993 |
| C | | (United States) | Horton, Chris (injured) | 2.03 m (6 ft 8 in) | 102 kg (225 lb) | 31 – 29 June 1994 |
| SF | 2 | (United States) | Harris, Alandise | 1.98 m (6 ft 6 in) | 104 kg (229 lb) | 35 – 23 November 1990 |
| SG | 3 | (United States) | Simpson, Trevis (injured) | 1.93 m (6 ft 4 in) | 84 kg (185 lb) | 34 – 5 September 1991 |
| C | 5 | (United States) | Macon, Elijah | 2.06 m (6 ft 9 in) | 109 kg (240 lb) | 32 – 3 November 1993 |
| PF | 24 | (Hungary) | Filipovics, Márkó | 2.05 m (6 ft 9 in) | 92 kg (203 lb) | 29 – 30 June 1996 |

Head coach

- (Serbia) Branislav Dzunic

Assistant coach(es)

- (Hungary) Góbi Henrik
- (Hungary) Peresztegi-Nagy Ákos

Legend

- (C) Team captain
- Injured

- Roster
Updated: Sep 28, 2017

=== Depth chart ===
| Pos. | Starting 5 | Bench 1 | Bench 2 | Bench 3 |
|---|---|---|---|---|
| C | Ákos Keller | Elijah Macon | | Chris Horton (Injured) |
| PF | Péter Lóránt | Márkó Filipovics |
| SF | Luka Markovic | Iván Keller | | Joel Nshimba (Injured) |
| SG | DJ Fenner | Alandise Harris | Máté Varga | Trevis Simpson (Injured) |
| PG | Kasey Hill | Ákos Kovács | | Péter Tóth (Injured) |

=== In ===
==== Players ====
- (Hungary) Ákos Kovács from Atomerőmű SE, Hungarian National Championship
- (United States) Kasey Hill from Florida Gators, Southeastern Conference, NCAA
- (United States) Chris Horton from Austin Peay Governors, Ohio Valley Conference, NCAA
- (United States) Alandise Harris from Louaize Club, Lebanese Basketball League
- (United States) DJ Fenner from Nevada Wolf Pack, Mountain West Conference, NCAA
- (United States) Trevis Simpson from Hyères-Toulon, LNB Pro A

==== Coaches ====
- (Hungary) Ákos Peresztegi-Nagy from David Kornel Basketball Academy (U20)

=== Out ===
==== Players ====
- (United States) James Farr to Élan Chalon, LNB Pro A
- (United States) Brandon Taylor to Steaua CSM EximBank Bucharest
- (United States) Justin Edwards to Orlandina Basket, Lega Basket Serie A
- (United States) Bradford Burgess
- (United States) Alhaji Mohammed
- (United States) Winston Shepard

==== Coaches ====
- (Hungary) Barnabás Blahó to David Kornel Basketball Academy (U20)

== Championship ==
The 2017–18 Nemzeti Bajnokság I/A is the 87th season of the Nemzeti Bajnokság I/A, the highest tier professional basketball league in Hungary.

=== Regular season ===
| Round | Home | Away | Date/Result |
|---|---|---|---|
| 1 | Kaposvári KK | Alba Fehérvár | ? |
| 2 | Falco KC Szombathely | Alba Fehérvár | 2017.10.07. |
| 3 | Alba Fehérvár | DEAC | 2017.10.11. |
| 4 | Zalakerámia ZTE KK | Alba Fehérvár | 2017.10.15. |
| 5 | PVSK_VEOLIA | Alba Fehérvár | 2017.10.21. |
| 6 | Alba Fehérvár | Szolnoki Olaj KK | 2017.10.27. |
| 7 | KTE-Duna Aszfalt | Alba Fehérvár | 2017.11.04. |
| 8 | Alba Fehérvár | SZTE-Szedeák | 2017.11.10. |
| 9 | Atomerőmű SE | Alba Fehérvár | 2017.11.18. |
| 10 | Alba Fehérvár | Sopron KC | 2017.12.09. |
| 11 | Alba Fehérvár | JP Auto-JKSE | 2017.12.16. |
| 12 | MAFC | Alba Fehérvár | 2017.12.22. |
| 13 | Alba Fehérvár | EGIS Körmend | 2017.12.28. |
| 14 | Kaposvári KK | Alba Fehérvár | 2018.01.06. |
| 15 | Alba Fehérvár | Falco KC Szombathely | 2018.01.13. |
| 16 | DEAC | Alba Fehérvár | 2018.01.20. |
| 17 | Alba Fehérvár | Zalakerámia ZTE KK | 2018.01.27. |
| 18 | Alba Fehérvár | PVSK-VEOLIA | 2018.01.31. |
| 19 | Szolnoki Olaj KK | Alba Fehérvár | 2018.02.03. |
| 20 | Alba Fehérvár | KTE-Duna Aszfalt | 2018.02.16. |
| 21 | SZTE-Szedeák | Alba Fehérvár | 2018.03.07. |
| 22 | Alba Fehérvár | Atomerőmű SE | 2018.03.10. |
| 23 | Sopron KC | Alba Fehérvár | 2018.03.14. |
| 24 | JP Auto-JKSE | Alba Fehérvár | 2018.03.17. |
| 25 | Alba Fehérvár | MAFC | 2018.03.21. |
| 26 | EGIS Körmend | Alba Fehérvár | 2018.03.24. |

== FIBA Champions League ==
The 2017–18 Basketball Champions League will be the second season of the Basketball Champions League (BCL), a European professional basketball competition for clubs that was launched by FIBA. The competition will begin on 19 September 2017, with the qualifying rounds, and will conclude on 6 May 2018.

=== 2nd qualifying round ===
A total of 16 teams are expected to play in the second qualifying round: Eight teams which enter in this round, and the eight winners of the first qualifying round. The first legs will be played on 24 September, and the second legs will be played on 26 September 2017.

| Team 1 | Agg. | Team 2 | 1st leg | 2nd leg |
|---|---|---|---|---|
| Kalev/Cramo (Estonia) | Game 9 | (Hungary) Alba Fehérvár | 78-71 | 66-79 |

=== 3rd qualifying round ===
A total of 16 teams are expected to play in the third qualifying round: Eight teams which enter in this round, and the eight winners of the second qualifying round. The first legs will be played on 29 September, and the second legs will be played on 2 October 2017.

| Team 1 | Agg. | Team 2 | 1st leg | 2nd leg |
|---|---|---|---|---|
| Alba Fehérvár (Hungary) | Game 23 | (Turkey) Pınar Karşıyaka | 29 Sep | 2 Oct |
