= 2022–23 Nemzeti Bajnokság I/A (men's basketball) =

Top flight Hungarian basketball season

Tippmix Férfi NB I/A^{1}
- Season: 2022–23
- Dates: 30 September 2022 – 28 May 2023
- Teams: 14
- TV partner: M4 Sport

Regular season
- Top seed: Falco-Vulcano Energia KC Szombathely

Finals
- Champions: Falco-Vulcano Energia KC Szombathely (5th title)
- Runners-up: Alba Fehérvár
- Third place: Egis Körmend
- Fourth place: Zalakerámia ZTE KK
- ^{1} Sponsored league name, referring to Tippmix.

The 2022–23 Nemzeti Bajnokság I/A season, also known as Tippmix Férfi NB I/A for sponsorship reasons, is the 92nd season of the Nemzeti Bajnokság I/A, the highest professional basketball league in Hungary. Falco Vulcano is the defending champion. It started on 1 October 2022 with the first round of the regular season and will end on 28 May 2023 with the last game of the finals.

== Teams ==
=== Team changes ===
Promoted from 2021–22 Nemzeti Bajnokság I/B	Relegated from 2021–22 Nemzeti Bajnokság I/A
Budapesti Honvéd SE	PVSK Panthers

=== Arenas and locations ===
Location of teams in 2022–23 Nemzeti Bajnokság I/A

The following 14 clubs compete in the Nemzeti Bajnokság I/A during the 2022–23 season:

Team	City	Arena	Capacity	2021–22
Alba Fehérvár	Székesfehérvár	Alba Regia Sportcsarnok	1,850	3rd
Atomerőmű SE	Paks	ASE Sportcsarnok	1,560	13th
DEAC	Debrecen	Oláh Gábor utcai Sportcsarnok	1,500	10th
Falco KC Szombathely	Szombathely	Arena Savaria	3,500	1st
Budapesti Honvéd SE	Budapest	Ludovika Aréna	1,350	1st (NB I/B - Red)
Kaposvári KK	Kaposvár	Kaposvár Aréna	2,931	9th
Kecskeméti TE	Kecskemét	Messzi István Sportcsarnok	1,851	4th
BC Körmend	Körmend	Városi Sportcsarnok	2,002	2nd
OSE Lions	Oroszlány	Krajnyik András Sportcsarnok	1,400	7th
Nyíregyháza Blue Sharks	Nyíregyháza	Continental Aréna	3,328	11th
Soproni KC	Sopron	Novomatic Aréna	1,250	6th
SZTE-Szedeák	Szeged	Városi Sportcsarnok	3,017	8th
Szolnoki Olajbányász	Szolnok	Tiszaligeti Sportcsarnok	2,122	5th
Zalaegerszegi TE	Zalaegerszeg	Városi Sportcsarnok	2,210	12th

== Regular season ==
Pos	Team	Pld	W	L	PF	PA	PD	Qualification
1	Falco-Vulcano Energia KC Szombathely	26	21	5	2292	1971	+321	Playoffs
2	Szolnoki Olajbányász	26	20	6	2193	1928	+265	Playoffs
3	Arconic-Alba Fehérvár	26	18	8	2377	2098	+279	Playoffs
4	Zalakerámia ZTE KK	26	16	10	2196	2091	+105	Playoffs
5	Soproni KC	26	15	11	2116	2003	+113	Playoffs
6	Duna Aszfalt-DTKH Kecskemét	26	15	11	1994	2038	−44	Playoffs
7	Egis Körmend	26	15	11	2147	2195	−48	Playoffs
8	DEAC-Tungsram	26	14	12	2066	2057	+9	Playoffs
9	Atomerőmű SE	26	14	12	2088	2074	+14	Playout
10	Kaposvári KK	26	10	16	2119	2231	−112	Playout
11	MVM-OSE Lions	26	9	17	1978	2173	−195	Playout
12	Naturtex-SZTE-Szedeák	26	7	19	2055	2145	−90	Playout
13	Budapesti Honvéd SE	26	6	20	1867	2108	−241	Playout
14	HÜBNER Nyíregyháza BS	26	2	24	1930	2306	−376	Playout

Source: Flashscore

== Playoffs ==
Fifth place
2	Szolnoki Olajbányász	2
8	DEAC	0
Seventh place
5	Soproni KC	1
6	Kecskeméti TE	2

Consolation semifinals
2	Szolnoki Olajbányász	3
6	Kecskeméti TE	1
5	Soproni KC	1
8	DEAC	3

Quarterfinals
1	Falco KC Szombathely	3
8	DEAC	0
4	Zalakerámia ZTE KK	3
5	Soproni KC	1
3	Alba Fehérvár	3
6	Kecskeméti TE	0
2	Szolnoki Olajbányász	2
7	Körmend	3

Semifinals
1	Falco KC Szombathely	3
4	Zalakerámia ZTE KK	0
3	Alba Fehérvár	3
7	Körmend	0

Final
1	Falco KC Szombathely	3
3	Alba Fehérvár	2
Third place
4	Zalakerámia ZTE KK	2
7	Körmend	3

== Playout ==
=== League table ===
Pos	Team	Pld	W	L	PF	PA	PD	Pts	Qualification
1	MVM-OSE Lions (Note: +4 adjust points (based on regular season standings))	10	9	1	865	746	+119	23	
2	Atomerőmű SE (Note: +6 adjust points (based on regular season standings))	10	5	5	814	809	+5	21	
3	SZTE-Szedeák (Note: +3 adjust points (based on regular season standings))	10	7	3	844	804	+40	20	
4	Kometa Kaposvári KK (Note: +5 adjust points (based on regular season standings))	10	3	7	811	845	−34	18	
5	Budapesti Honvéd SE (Note: +2 adjust points (based on regular season standings))	10	4	6	764	791	−27	16	
6	HÜBNER Nyíregyháza BS (Note: +1 adjust points (based on regular season standings))	10	2	8	759	862	−103	13	▼ Relegation to Nemzeti Bajnokság I/B

Source: Flashscore
Rules for classification: 1) Games played; 2) Points; 3) Wins; 4) Defeats; 5) Points scored; 6) Points against; 7) Victories/Defeats series; 8) in Home games; 9) as a Guest; 10) Last 5 matches.

== Statistics ==
=== Number of teams by counties and regions ===
Number of teams by counties
Pos.	County (megye)	No. of teams	Teams
1	Vas	2	Falco Szombathely and Körmend
2	Bács-Kiskun	1	Kecskeméti TE
2	Budapest	1	Honvéd
2	Csongrád-Csanád	1	SZTE-Szedeák
2	Fejér	1	Alba Fehérvár
2	Győr-Moson-Sopron	1	Soproni KC
2	Hajdú-Bihar	1	DEAC
2	Jász-Nagykun-Szolnok	1	Szolnoki Olajbányász
2	Komárom-Esztergom	1	OSE Lions
2	Somogy	1	Kaposvári KK
2	Szabolcs-Szatmár-Bereg	1	Nyíregyháza Blue Sharks
2	Tolna	1	Atomerőmű SE
2	Zala	1	Zalaegerszegi TE

Number of teams by regions
Transdanubia	Central Hungary	Great Plain and North
Alba Fehérvár; Atomerőmű SE; Falco KC Szombathely; Kaposvári KK; BC Körmend; OSE Lions; Soproni KC; Zalaegerszegi TE	Budapesti Honvéd	DEAC; Nyíregyháza Blue Sharks; Kecskeméti TE; SZTE-Szedeák; Szolnoki Olajbányász
8 Teams	1 Team	5 Teams

== Nemzeti Bajnokság I/A clubs in European competitions ==
FIBA competitions
Team	Competition	Progress	W–L
Falco Szombathely	Champions League	Regular Season	2–4
Egis Körmend	Champions League	Qualifying tournaments	0–1
Egis Körmend	FIBA Europe Cup	Regular Season	0–6

== See also ==
- 2023 Magyar Kupa
