= 2019–20 Nemzeti Bajnokság I/A (men's basketball) =

Nemzeti Bajnokság I/A
- Season: 2019–20
- Dates: September 2019 – June 2020
- Games played: 182 (regular season)
- Teams: 14
- TV partner: M4 Sport

Finals
- Champions: None named

The 2019–20 Nemzeti Bajnokság I/A (English: National Championship I/A) was the 89th season of the Nemzeti Bajnokság I/A, the highest professional basketball league in Hungary. Falco Vulcano is the defending champion.

On 17 March 2020, the competition was prematurely finished due to the coronavirus pandemic. No champion was named.

== Teams ==
Location of teams in 2019–20 Nemzeti Bajnokság I/A

The following 14 clubs competed in the NB I/A during the 2019–20 season. OSE Lions are promoted to this season as champions from the Hungarian 2018–19 NB I/B. TF Budapest was relegated.

=== Arenas and locations ===
Team	City	Hall	Capacity
Alba Fehérvár	Székesfehérvár	Vodafone Sportcsarnok	1,850
Atomerőmű SE	Paks	ASE Sportcsarnok	1,500
DEAC	Debrecen	Oláh Gábor utcai Sportcsarnok	1,200
Falco KC Szombathely	Szombathely	Arena Savaria	3,070
Jászberényi KSE	Jászberény	Bercsényi Tornacsarnok	1,070
Kaposvári KK	Kaposvár	Kaposvár Aréna	3,000
Kecskeméti TE	Kecskemét	Messzi István Sportcsarnok	1,900
BC Körmend	Körmend	Körmend Aréna	2,002
OSE Lions	Oroszlány	Krajnyik "Akác" András Sportcsarnok	1,465
Pécsi VSK	Pécs	Lauber Dezső Sportcsarnok	3,548
Sopron KC	Sopron	Novomatic Aréna	2,000
SZTE-Szedeák	Szeged	Újszegedi Sportcsarnok	3,017
Szolnoki Olajbányász	Szolnok	Tiszaligeti Sportcsarnok	2,122
Zalaegerszegi TE	Zalaegerszeg	Városi Sportcsarnok	2,816

== Regular season ==
=== League table ===
Pos	Team	Pld	W	L	PF	PA	PD	Pts	Qualification
1	Falco-Vulcano KC Szombathely	21	18	3	1797	1525	+272	39	Qualification for Champions League
2	Egis Körmend	21	17	4	1785	1587	+198	38	Qualification for FIBA Europe Cup
3	Atomerőmű SE	21	14	7	1827	1702	+125	35	
4	DEAC	21	13	8	1749	1700	+49	34	
5	Pécsi VSK-VEOLIA	21	12	9	1780	1803	−23	33	
6	Alba Fehérvár	21	11	10	1851	1860	−9	32	
7	Szolnoki Olajbányász	21	11	10	1671	1619	+52	32	Qualification for FIBA Europe Cup
8	Zalakerámia ZTE KK	21	10	11	1838	1852	−14	31	
9	OSE Lions	21	10	11	1718	1711	+7	31	
10	KTE-Duna Aszfalt	21	9	12	1635	1717	−82	30	
11	Soproni KC	21	9	12	1674	1695	−21	30	
12	Kaposvári KK	22	7	15	1793	1841	−48	29	
13	Naturtex-SZTE-Szedeák	22	5	17	1763	1966	−203	27	
14	JP Auto-JKSE	21	2	19	1449	1752	−303	23	

Updated to match(es) played on 11 March 2020. Source: Kosarsport.hu
Rules for classification: 1) Games played; 2) Points; 3) Wins; 4) Defeats; 5) Points for; 6) Points against; 7) Victories/Defeats series; 8) in Home games; 9) as a Guest; 10) Last 5 matches.

=== Results ===
Home \ Away	ALB	ATO	SZO	DEA	FAL	JAS	KAP	KTE	KOR	OSE	PVS	SOP	SZE	ZTE
Alba Fehérvár	—	88–83	90–89	99–87	82–95	107–72	99–88		85–98		88–86		95–83	
Atomerőmű SE	109–80	—	75–84	74–75		77–62	91–65	90–84	63–80	89–85			86–79	94–70
Szolnoki Olajbányász	80–100		—	80–62		89–75	75–69	94–69	84–87	66–73	100–75	84–70		73–78
DEAC		75–76	81–68	—	73–88	83–66	81–79	73–57		71–87	89–59	87–71	94–78	98–92
Falco-Vulcano KC Szombathely	89–63	92–76	81–63		—	77–67	81–74	75–63		83–59	101–69	80–68	99–66	
JP Auto-JKSE	82–95	83–95	54–75		60–65	—		78–85		67–93	85–88	66–76	81–75	65–83
Kaposvári KK		58–85	78–98	92–94	74–81	68–69	—	87–62		91–83	73–86	87–59	82–69	76–82
KTE-Duna Aszfalt	89–76	99–105		80–86	81–93	75–65		—	75–74			90–80	78–81	80–75
Egis Körmend	94–80	93–84	89–60	96–90	83–70	87–53	91–71	83–68	—	84–63	79–80	76–71	96–84	
OSE Lions	99–102	81–105	77–64	72–87	87–84		78–85	67–66	71–72	—	91–69	91–75		104–115
Pécsi VSK-VEOLIA	91–86	78–103		88–76		89–59	82–99	84–62	94–80		—	73–91	103–73	119–114
Soproni KC	88–82	80–82	85–73	98–85	79–74	91–66	101–96		80–84	61–82		—	94–70	78–85
Naturtex-SZTE-Szedeák	80–88		69–90	100–102	90–100	79–74		77–86	79–83	91–84	72–84		—	85–79
Zalakerámia ZTE KK		111–85	80–91		89–98		102–113		82–76	84–91	86–89	82–78	106–99	—

Updated to match(es) played on 11 March 2020. Source: Kosarsport.hu
Legend: Blue = home team win; Red = away team win.

== Hungarian clubs in European competitions ==
Club	Competition	Progress
Falco-Vulcano	Champions League	Regular season
Egis Körmend	FIBA Europe Cup	Second round
Pécsi VSK-VEOLIA	FIBA Europe Cup	Regular season
