= Zoltán Horváth (basketball) =

Hungarian basketball player

Personal information
- Born: September 27, 1979 Satu Mare, Romania
- Died: December 28, 2009 (aged 30) Szombathely, Hungary
- Listed height: 6 ft 9.5 in (2.07 m)
- Listed weight: 241 lb (109 kg)

Career information
- NBA draft: 2001: undrafted
- Playing career: 2003–2009
- Position: Power forward / center

Career history
- 2003–2005: PVSK Panthers
- 2005–2007: Atomerőmű
- 2007: PAOK Thessaloniki
- 2007–2008: Atomerőmű
- 2008–2009: Falco Szombathely

Career highlights
- No. 18 retired by Falco KC Szombathely

Zoltán Horváth (27 September 1979 – 28 December 2009) was a Hungarian professional basketball player. He played for the Hungarian national basketball team from 2005 to 2009.

Horváth began his career on senior level in 2003 with the team of the PVSK Panthers from Pécs. He soon became the leading rebounder of the team, and in 2005 moved to the Hungarian league's defending champion, Atomerőmű SE. There, Horváth won the domestic championship and reached the national cup's final in his first year, and played in the FIBA EuroCup the following season. In 2007, he was signed by PAOK Thessaloniki, but played just four games for them before returning to Atomerőmű. Horváth then again became part of the defending domestic champion's roster, in that case Falco KC Szombathely. He reached the domestic cup's final in 2009, and developed into one of the league's dominating players during his last months, scoring more than 20 points in the first five matches of the season.

As part of his country's national team, Horváth took part in one match of the EuroBasket 2005 qualification, in six matches of the EuroBasket 2007 qualification, and in all six matches of the EuroBasket 2009 qualification's relegation. Although the Hungarian team eventually did not qualify for any of these tournaments, they at least avoided relegation from the Division A.

On 28 December 2009, Horváth was killed in a traffic accident on his way to Szombathely. He had crashed head-on into a truck after losing control of his car on the road's icy surface.
