= Darko Radulović =

Macedonian basketball player

Resovia Rzeszów
- Title: Head coach
- League: I Liga

Personal information
- Born: July 19, 1980 (age 46) Skopje, SR Macedonia, SFR Yugoslavia
- Listed height: 1.93 m (6 ft 4 in)

Career information
- Playing career: 2001–2016
- Position: Shooting guard

Career history

Playing
- 2001–2003: Nikol Fert
- 2003–2004: Polo Trejd
- 2005–2006: Toa Sum Jas
- 2006–2007: MZT Skopje
- 2007–2008: Feni Industries
- 2008–2009: MZT Skopje
- 2009–2010: Vardar Osiguruvanje
- 2010–2011: Vardar
- 2011–2012: Feni Industries
- 2012–2013: Kozuv
- 2013–2014: Kumanovo
- 2014–2015: Feni Industries
- 2015–2016: Vardar

Coaching
- 2016–2018: Vardar (assistant)
- 2018–2020: Vardar
- 2020–2021: MZT Skopje (assistant)
- 2021–2022: MZT Skopje
- 2022: Bashkimi Prizren
- 2022–2024: Hübner Nyíregyháza
- 2024–2026: Starogard Gdański
- 2026–present: Resovia Rzeszów

Darko Radulović (Macedonian: Дарко Радуловиќ; born July 19, 1980) is a Macedonian basketball coach and former professional player, who currently serves as head coach for Resovia Rzeszów of the Polish I Liga.
