= Srećko Sekulović =

Serbian basketball coach and player

Personal information
- Born: 12 June 1962 (age 64) Vrbas, PR Serbia, Yugoslavia

Career information
- NBA draft: 1984: undrafted
- Playing career: 1980–1995
- Position: Head Coach
- Coaching career: 1995–present

Career history

Playing
- 1980–1989: Spartak
- Doxa Nicosia
- ENAD Nicosia
- Hübner Nyíregyháza
- Debreceni Vadkakasok

Coaching
- 1995–1996: KK Satex Subotica
- 1996–1997: AIK Bačka Topola
- 1997–2000: Spartak
- 2000–2002: Falco Szombathely
- 2002–2005: Ergonom Best
- 2005: Atlas Beograd
- 2005–2006: Swisslion Takovo
- 2006–2009: Falco Szombathely
- 2009–2010: Alba Fehérvár
- 2010–2012: PVSK Panthers
- 2012–2014: Târgu Mureș
- 2014–2015: Jászberényi KSE
- 2015–2016: Kaposvári
- 2016–2018: Falco Szombathely
- 2018–2019: Atomerőmű SE
- 2019: Fair Play
- 2020–2021: SZTE-Szedeák
- 2021–2022: Spartak

Srećko Sekulović (Serbian Cyrillic: Срећко Секуловић; born 12 June 1962), credited as Szrecsko Szekulovics in Hungary, is a Serbian professional basketball coach and former player.

== Playing career ==
Sekulović played for Spartak Subotica, Cypriot teams Doxa and ENAD Nicosia, and Hungarian teams Hübner Nyíregyháza and Debreceni Vadkakasok.

== Coaching career ==
Sekulović coached KK Satex Subotica, AIK Bačka Topola, Spartak, Falco Szombathely, Ergonom Best, Atlas Beograd, Swisslion Takovo, Alba Fehérvár, PVSK Panthers, Kaposvári, Târgu Mureș, Jászberényi KSE, Atomerőmű SE, and Fair Play.

In 2020, Sekulović joined SZTE-Szedeák. On 8 November 2021, he resigned as their head coach. On 10 November 2021, Spartak Office Shoes hired Sekulović as their new head coach.

== Career achievements ==
As head coach

- Hungarian I/A League champion: 1 (with Falco Szombathely: 2007–08)
- Second Basketball League of Serbia champion: 1 (with Spartak: 2021–22)
- YUBA B League champion: 1 (with Swisslion Takovo: 2005–06)
- League Cup of Serbia winner: 1 (with Ergonom: 2002–03)
