= Péter Kovács (basketball) =

Hungarian basketball player (born 1989)

No. 10 – Szolnoki Olajbányász
- Position: Shooting guard
- League: NB I/A

Personal information
- Born: 25 October 1988 (age 38) Baja, Hungary
- Listed height: 6 ft 2 in (1.88 m)

Career information
- NBA draft: 2010: undrafted
- Playing career: 2010–present

Career history
- 2010–2014: PVSK Panthers
- 2014–2016: Kecskeméti KSE
- 2012–2016: Atomerőmű SE
- 2016: Szolnoki Olaj
- 2016–2017: Falco
- 2017–present: Szolnoki Olaj / Olajbányász

Péter Kovács (born 25 October 1988) is a Hungarian basketball player for Szolnoki Olaj of the Hungarian NB I/A and the Hungarian national team.

He participated at the EuroBasket 2017.
