= Darius Perry =

American basketball player (born 1999)

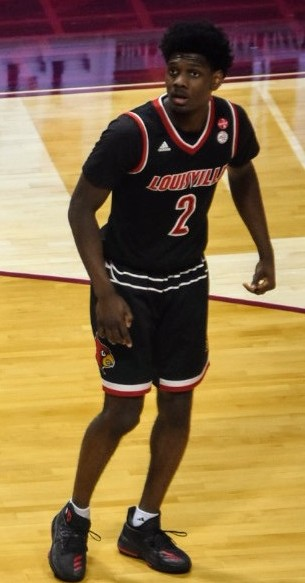
- Perry with Louisville in 2018

No. 11 – MHP Riesen Ludwigsburg
- Position: Point guard
- League: BBL

Personal information
- Born: March 13, 1999 (age 27)
- Listed height: 6 ft 2 in (1.88 m)
- Listed weight: 185 lb (84 kg)

Career information
- High school: Mount Vernon (Sandy Springs, Georgia); Wheeler (Marietta, Georgia)
- College: Louisville (2017–2020); UCF (2020–2022)

Career history
- 2022–2023: Hübner Nyíregyháza
- 2023–2024: Würzburg
- 2024: Promitheas Patras
- 2024–2025: Hapoel Gilboa Galil
- 2025: Zastal Zielona Góra
- 2025–2026: Real Sebastiani Rieti
- 2026–present: Riesen Ludwigsburg

Career highlights
- Third-team All-AAC (2021)

Darius James Perry (born March 13, 1999) is an American professional basketball player for Riesen Ludwigsburg of the Basketball Bundesliga (BBL). He has previously played college basketball for the UCF Knights of the American Athletic Conference (AAC), and the Louisville Cardinals.

== High school career ==
Perry played basketball for Mount Vernon Presbyterian School in Sandy Springs, Georgia as a freshman. For his sophomore season, he transferred to Wheeler High School in Marietta, Georgia, and helped his team capture the Class 6A state title. As a junior, Perry averaged 15 points and 4.3 assists per game. In his senior season, he averaged 20.2 points, 5.1 assists, 4.3 rebounds and 3.1 steals per game, and helped Wheeler reach the Class 6A state quarterfinals. A consensus four-star recruit, he committed to playing college basketball for Louisville, choosing the Cardinals over an offer from Georgia, among others.

== College career ==
As a freshman at Louisville, Perry averaged 3.9 points and 1.5 assists per game. He averaged 5.4 points and 1.5 assists per game as a sophomore. On November 10, 2019, Perry recorded 10 points, 12 assists and five rebounds in a 78–55 win over Youngstown State. On January 25, 2020, he had a season-high 19 points and five rebounds in an 80–62 win over Clemson. In his junior season, he averaged 5.2 points and 2.5 assists per game. After the season, Perry transferred to UCF. On February 10, 2021, he posted a career-high 27 points in a 61–60 loss to Wichita State. As a senior, Perry averaged 14.7 points, 3.6 rebounds and 3.4 assists per game, earning Third Team All-American Athletic Conference (AAC) honors. He declared for the 2021 NBA draft before opting to return to UCF for his fifth season of eligibility, granted by the NCAA due to the COVID-19 pandemic.

== Professional career ==
On February 21, 2025, he signed with Zastal Zielona Góra in the Polish Basketball League (PLK).

On July 9, 2026, Perry signed with Riesen Ludwigsburg of the German Basketball Bundesliga (BBL).

== Career statistics ==
Legend
GP	Games played	GS	Games started	MPG	Minutes per game
FG%	Field goal percentage	3P%	3-point field goal percentage	FT%	Free throw percentage
RPG	Rebounds per game	APG	Assists per game	SPG	Steals per game
BPG	Blocks per game	PPG	Points per game	**Bold**	Career high

=== College ===
Year	Team	GP	GS	MPG	FG%	3P%	FT%	RPG	APG	SPG	BPG	PPG
2017–18	Louisville	**36**	3	14.3	.351	.329	**.864**	1.2	1.5	.6	.1	3.9
2018–19	Louisville	33	11	16.3	**.447**	.375	.810	1.4	1.5	.4	.0	5.4
2019–20	Louisville	31	26	19.5	.391	**.389**	.750	1.5	2.5	.5	.0	5.2
2020–21	UCF	19	13	**31.7**	.405	.383	**.864**	3.6	3.4	1.3	**.2**	**14.7**
2021–22	UCF	30	**29**	29.6	.397	.361	.725	**3.9**	**4.4**	**1.6**	**.2**	11.8
Career		149	82	21.1	.399	.368	.802	2.1	2.6	.8	.1	7.5
