= Roko Badžim =

Croatian basketball player

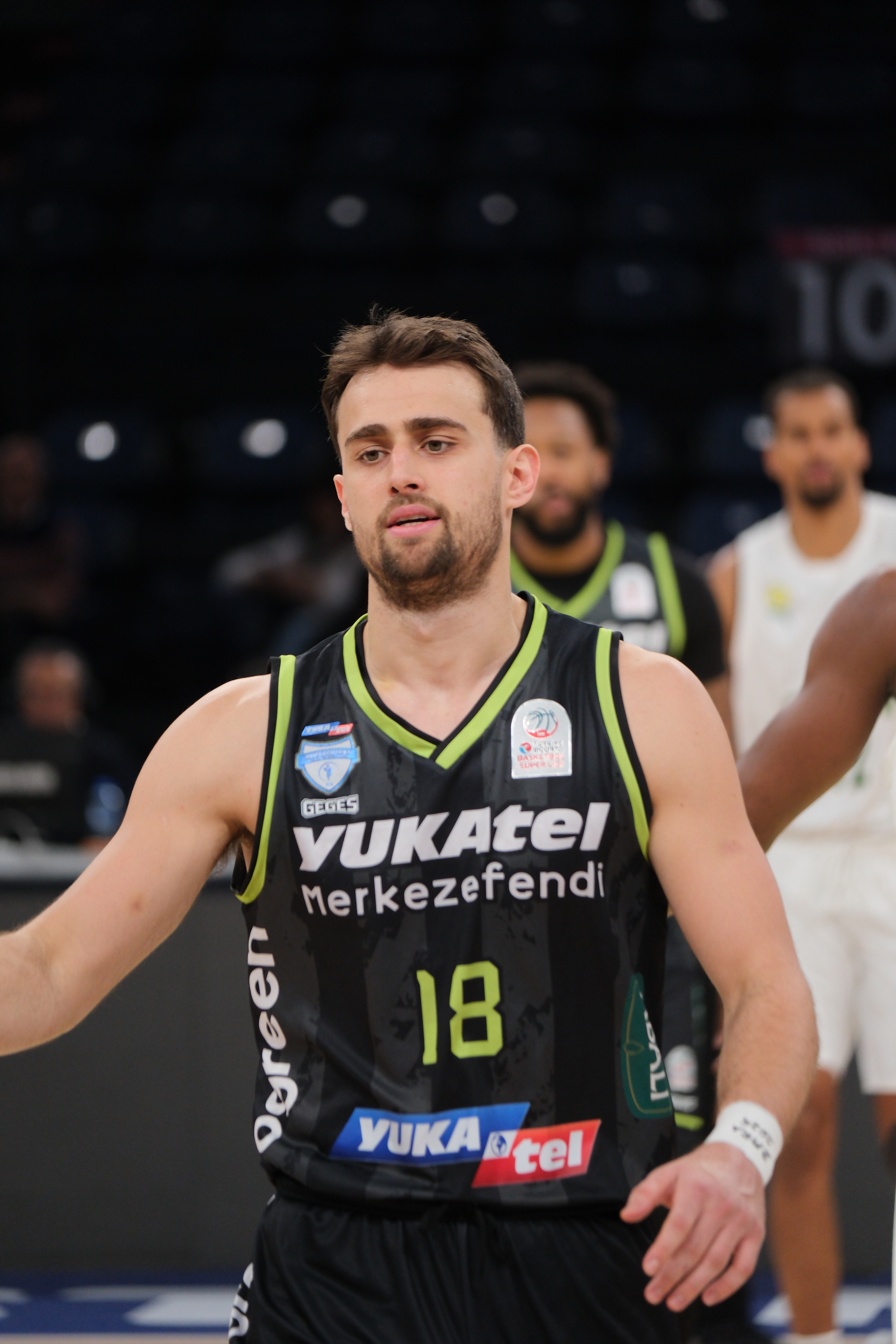
- Badžim with Merkezefendi in 2026

No. 18 – Cibona Zagreb
- Position: Shooting guard
- League: Croatian League

Personal information
- Born: August 18, 1997 (age 29) Šibenik, Croatia
- Listed height: 1.97 m (6 ft 6 in)
- Listed weight: 90 kg (198 lb)

Career information
- NBA draft: 2019: undrafted
- Playing career: 2012–present

Career history
- 2012–2017: Šibenik
- 2017–2019: Petrol Olimpija
- 2019–2020: Cibona
- 2020–2022: Szolnoki Olaj
- 2022–2023: Konyaspor
- 2023: Monbus Obradoiro
- 2024–2026: Merkezefendi Basket
- 2026–present: Cibona Zagreb
Medals
Men's basketball
Representing Croatia
FIBA Europe Under-20 Championship Division B
| Silver medal – second place | 2017 Romania | National U-20 Team |
FIBA U19 World Championship
| Silver medal – second place | 2015 Greece | National U-19 Team |
FIBA U18 Europe Championship
| Bronze medal – third place | 2014 Turkey | National U-18 Team |

Roko Badžim (born August 18, 1997) is a Croatian professional basketball player for Cibona Zagreb of the Croatian League and
ABA League. Standing at 1.97 m (6 ft 5 1/2 in), he plays at the combo guard position.

== Professional career ==
=== GKK Šibenik (2012–2017) ===
Badžim started his professional career in 2012, as a 15-years old GKK Šibenik player.

=== Slovenia (2017–2019) ===
On June 29, 2017, he signed with Slovenian champion Petrol Olimpija.

=== Cibona (2019–2020) ===
He joined Cibona in 2019 and averaged 9.4 points per game on 46% shooting from behind the arc. He was released by the team on July 15, 2020.

=== Konyaspor (2022–2023) ===
On July 15, 2022, he has signed with Konyaspor of the Turkish Basketbol Süper Ligi (BSL).

=== Merkezefendi Belediyesi (2024–present) ===
On January 2, 2024, he signed with Merkezefendi Bld. Denizli Basket of the Basketbol Süper Ligi (BSL).

== National team career ==
Badžim debuted for the Croatian national team in November 2021 at the 2023 FIBA Basketball World Cup qualification game against Slovenia.

== Personal life ==
Roko was born in 1997, in Šibenik, to a father Živko, former professional basketball player who also played in Olimpija in Slovenia and Fenerbahçe in Turkey.
