= Benedek Váradi =

Hungarian basketball player

No. 10 – Falco KC Szombathely
- Position: Point Guard
- League: Nemzeti Bajnokság I/A

Personal information
- Born: 5 February 1995 (age 31) Szombathely, Hungary
- Listed height: 1.95 m (6 ft 5 in)

Career information
- Playing career: 2012–present

Career history
- 2012–2022: Falco KC
- 2022–2023: Rytas Vilnius
- 2023–2024: Trefl Sopot
- 2024–present: Falco KC Szombathely

Career highlights
- PLK champion (2024); 3x Hungarian League champion (2019, 2021, 2022); Hungarian Cup winner (2021)

Benedek Váradi (born 5 February 1995) is a Hungarian professional basketball player for Falco KC Szombathely of the Hungarian Basketball League.

== Professional career ==
Váradi has been the team captain of his club Falco KC, which he led to the Championship of the 2018–19 Nemzeti Bajnokság I/A season. During the 2020–21 season, Váradi averaged 12.2 points and 5.4 assists per game. He re-signed with the team on 16 August 2021.

On July 13, 2023, he signed with Trefl Sopot of the Polish Basketball League (PLK).

== National team ==
Váradi has been a member of the Hungarian national basketball team. At the EuroBasket 2022 qualification, Hungary surprisingly defeated defending Champion Slovenia 77–75. Váradi labelled the victory as "among the most important" in his career.
