= Wesley Gordon (basketball) =

American basketball player (born 1994)

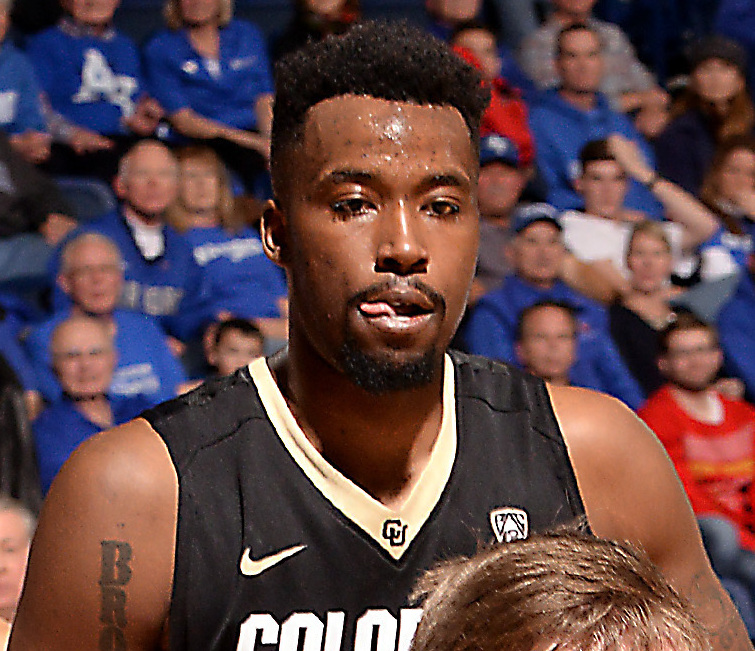
- Gordon with Colorado in 2016

Free Agent
- Position: Center

Personal information
- Born: July 14, 1994 (age 32) Colorado Springs, Colorado, U.S.
- Listed height: 6 ft 9 in (2.06 m)
- Listed weight: 220 lb (100 kg)

Career information
- High school: Sierra (Colorado Springs, Colorado)
- College: Colorado (2012–2017)
- NBA draft: 2017: undrafted
- Playing career: 2017–present

Career history
- 2017–2018: Panthers Fürstenfeld
- 2018–2019: Soproni KC
- 2019–2020: Rethymno Cretan Kings
- 2020: ESSM Le Portel
- 2020–2021: Larisa
- 2021–2022: Körmend
- 2022–2023: Trefl Sopot
- 2023–2025: Spójnia Stargard
- 2025: Astros de Jalisco
- 2025–2026: GTK Gliwice

Career highlights
- PLK rebounding leader (2026); 2× PLK blocks leader (2024, 2025); Polish Cup winner (2023); Hungarian League blocks leader (2019); Hungarian League Top Rebounder (2019); Austrian League blocks leader (2018); Austrian League All-Star (2018)

Wesley Gordon (born July 14, 1994) is an American professional basketball player who last played for GTK Gliwice of the Polish Basketball League (PLK). He played college basketball for Colorado Buffaloes from 2012 until 2017. Gordon entered the 2017 NBA draft, but he was not selected in the draft's two rounds.

== High school career ==
Gordon attended Sierra High School in Colorado Springs, Colorado. As a senior, he led Sierra to the state title game, falling to Josh Scott-led Lewis-Palmer High School. Gordon signed with Colorado out of high school.

== College career ==
Gordon played four seasons with Colorado Buffaloes, where he averaged 6.6 points, 6.7 rebounds, 1.3 assists and 1.6 blocks per game. He redshirted his freshman year before averaging 5.9 points and 6.0 rebounds per game as a redshirt freshman. He was the second player in the history of his university to achieve more than 200 caps, achieving 204, only being behind by David Harrison, who achieved 225 between 2001 and 2004. It is also the eighth-best mark in the history of the Pac-12 Conference.

== Professional career ==
=== Panthers Fürstenfeld ===
After going undrafted in the 2017 NBA draft, Gordon signed with the Austrian club Panthers Fürstenfeld in October 2017. During his first season, he led the league in blocks and was one of the top rebounders of the league.

=== Soproni KC ===
For the next season, he joined Soproni KC of the Hungarian League. He led the league in both blocks and rebounds per game.

=== Rethymno Cretan Kings ===
On July 9, 2019, Gordon joined Rethymno Cretan Kings of the Greek Basket League. He averaged 8.1 points, 6.8 rebounds and 1.3 blocks per game.

=== Le Portel ===
On July 9, 2020, Gordon signed with ESSM Le Portel of the French LNB Pro A.

=== Trefl Sopot ===
On July 22, 2022, he has signed with Trefl Sopot of the Polish Basketball League.

=== Spójnia Stargard ===
On July 13, 2023, he signed with Spójnia Stargard of the Polish Basketball League (PLK).

=== GTK Gliwice ===
On November 6, 2025, Gordon signed with GTK Gliwice for the 2025–2026 season.

== Personal life ==
Gordon is the son of Eddie and Lisa Gordon. His older brother was in the United States Army.
