= Gašper Potočnik =

Slovenian basketball coach

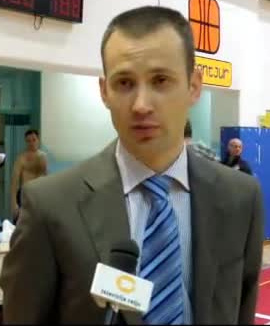
- Potočnik in 2012

Soproni KC
- Position: Head coach

Personal information
- Born: 20 December 1980 (age 45) Ljubljana, SR Slovenia, SFR Yugoslavia
- Coaching career: 1999–present

Career history

Coaching
- 1999: Škofja Loka U16 and U18 (assistant)
- 2000: Škofja Loka U16 and U18
- 2000–2003: ŽKK Škofja Loka
- 2003–2007: Škofja Loka
- 2007–2010: Union Olimpija (assistant)
- 2010–2011: Škofja Loka
- 2011–2012: Elektra Šoštanj
- 2012–2013: Krka (assistant)
- 2013: Krka
- 2013–2015: Union Olimpija U19
- 2014–2015: Škofja Loka
- 2015–2016: Union Olimpija
- 2016–2018: EGIS Körmend
- 2018–2019: Bnei Herzliya
- 2019: Petrol Olimpija (assistant)
- 2019–2023: Szolnoki Olajbányász
- 2023–present: Soproni KC

Career highlights
- 2× Slovenian Second League champion (2005,2015); Slovenian League champion (2013); Slovenian U19 League champion (2015)

Gašper Potočnik (born 20 December 1980) is a Slovenian professional basketball coach, currently serving as head coach for Soproni KC of the Hungarian basketball league.

On 14 December 2016 Potočnik was named EGIS Körmend new head coach, replacing Teo Čizmić. On 15 August 2018 Potočnik was named Bnei Herzliya head coach, signing a two-year deal, but on 15 January 2019 Potočnik parted ways with Herzliya after four consecutive losses.
