= Alba Regia Sportcsarnok =

Indoor arena in Székesfehérvár, Hungary

- Interactive map of Alba Regia Sportcsarnok
- Former names: ARÉV Sportcentrum; 1978–2010; Vodafone Sportcentrum; 2010-2016; Alba Regia Sportcsarnok; 2016–present
- Location: Székesfehérvár, Hungary
- Coordinates: 47°11′29.3″N 18°25′09.9″E
- Owner: Municipality of Székesfehérvár
- Operator: Municipality of Székesfehérvár
- Capacity: 3,000 (basketball); 5,000 (concerts)
- Surface: Parquet
- Field size: 54 x 36 m

Construction
- Opened: 1978
- Renovated: 1999
- Expanded: 2014

Tenants
- Alba Fehérvár; 1978–present David Kornel Basketball Academy; 2004-present

Alba Regia Sportcsarnok is an indoor arena in Székesfehérvár, Hungary. It hosts a number of sport clubs from amateur to professional level, with 2017 Hungarian basketball championship winner Alba Fehérvár being its most notable tenant.

== Features ==
The 650-square-meter (7,000 sq ft) field can be used for any indoor sports (basketball, mini-football, table-tennis, box events etc.) except handball. The sport center has a 500-square-meter (5,400 sq ft) gym with qualified trainers who can help to the sport lovers. In the hall there is a café and bar.

Alba Regia Sportcentrum has 3,000 seating places for basketball events, that can be expanded by further 1000 seats at the field if necessary. For other events, such as concerts and shows, the figures can go up to 5,000, including standing places.

== Events ==
- 2015 FIBA Europe Under-20 Championship (Division B)
- 2016-2017 FIBA Europe Cup games
- 2017 FIBA Champions League games
- 2017-2018 FIBA Europe Cup games
- 2017 Fight Arena International Professional Fighting Gala
- 2017 Whitney - Queen of The Night
