= Falco KC Szombathely =

Falco Szombathely
- Leagues: Nemzeti Bajnokság I/A; Champions League
- Founded: 1980; 46 years ago
- History: Falco KC Szombathely; 1980–Present
- Arena: Arena Savaria
- Capacity: 3,500
- Location: Szombathely, Hungary
- Team colors: Yellow, black
- President: György Gráczer
- Head coach: Miloš Konakov
- Championships: 7 Hungarian Championships; 3 Hungarian Cup
- Retired numbers: 2 (8, 18)
- Website: falcokc.com
Home	Away

Falco Kosárlabda Club, for sponsorship reasons named Falco Volvo Alpok Autó Szombathely, is a Hungarian professional basketball club based in Szombathely. The team play their home games at Arena Savaria, a multi-use complex, which was opened in 2006.

== History ==
=== Beginning and uprising ===
The club was created in 1980, when basketball fanatics György Gráczer and István Németh with the support of the local wood industry Falco started to organize meetings and trainings. In that year the club entered the county level championship. In 1987, Falco decided to invest more money into the club and the success was immediate. By winning the championship in the 1987/88 season they won promotion to the second division. In the next year they did surprisingly well, finishing on the top in the regular season with only two losses, but failed in the play-offs final. A season later there was nothing what could prevent the yellow-blacks to lift the trophy in the final, and with that, after 27 years Szombathely got a top-flight basketball team again.

=== Successful years ===
The goal in the inaugural season couldn't be more than to stay in the NBI, which they clearly managed. In the following years Falco turned into a good mid-table team with a good reputation. In the 1995/96 and 1996/97 season Falco have been only a step away from the semifinals, fallen in decisive fifth match. In the next year the team finished only 7th in the league but won silver medal in the Hungarian National Basketball Cup. The team reached its top performance next year, finishing second in the National Championship and beating teams like Rimini and Beşiktaş in the Korać Cup.

=== Financial crisis and revival ===
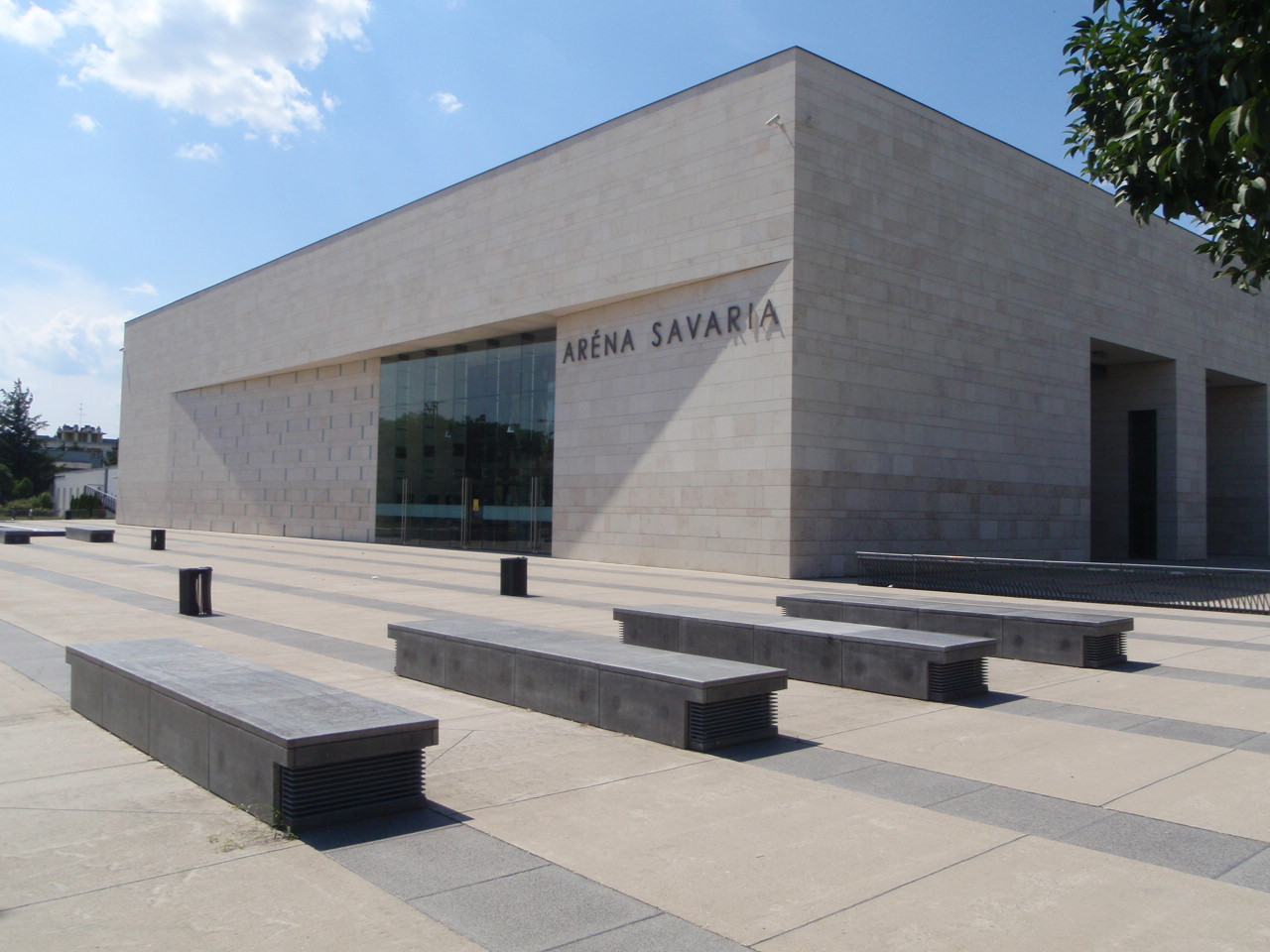
The Arena Savaria, home venue of Falco since 2006

In the next few years Falco continued with high-level results, but a slow decreasing had been noticed. For 2002 the team went into a financial crisis, and produced the worst final place of the past years. A long-term, step by step financial consolidation plan have been accepted in that year, which saved the club from bankruptcy, but prevented the club to make quality signings. Still, the team had won a valuable bronze medal in the Hungarian Cup. After the financials have been cleared a quick improvement have started. In 2006 Falco moved to the newly built Arena Savaria and Srećko Sekulović arrived to coach the guys. In his first year in charge, after beating the reigning champion Atomerőmű, the team finished fourth in the playoff. In the 2007/2008 season Falco played unstoppable, the hard-work of Sekulović fructified and won the Championship title, first time in the club's history by beating arch-rival Körmend 3–1. In the Cup they marched till the final, where they lost to Atomerőmű in an epic battle. Nowadays Falco considered one of the top clubs in the country in a highly competitive league and have one of the best youth base in the country.

In 2015, Falco played in the 2015–16 FIBA Europe Cup, the third-tier continental level. Finishing with a 2–4 record in Group C, Falco was eliminated in the regular season.

In the following 2016–17 season, Falco had a successful year in the NB I/A. The club reached the playoff finals for the first time, where its lost 3–2 to Alba Fehérvár.

In the 2017–18 FIBA Europe Cup season, Falco played better as it had a 3–3 record but the club did not advance past the regular season.

In the 2018–19 season, Falco won its second national championship completing a total sweep in the playoffs. In the quarter-finals they eliminated KTE. Then they made it to the finals with sweeping Szolnoki Olaj KK. In the finals they upset their local rival BC Körmend 3–0, celebrating the Championship Title away.

In the 2019–20 season, Falco managed to qualify for the Basketball Champions League (BCL). Since the league was cut short due to the COVID-19 pandemic, Falco gained the rights to join again for the 2020–21 season.

== Players ==
=== Current roster ===
Falco KC Szombathely roster
Players
Coaches

Pos.	No.	Nat.	Name	Ht.	Wt.	Age
G	2	(Hungary)	Tanoh Dez, András	1.90 m (6 ft 3 in)	82 kg (181 lb)	24 – 29 March 2002
PG	4	(United States)	Trammell, Darrion	1.78 m (5 ft 10 in)	78 kg (172 lb)	25 – 20 October 2000
G	5	(Hungary)	Horváth, Roland	1.84 m (6 ft 0 in)	78 kg (172 lb)	18 – 2 December 2007
C	6	(Hungary)	Keller, Ákos	2.10 m (6 ft 11 in)	110 kg (243 lb)	37 – 28 March 1989
G/F	9	(Hungary)	Perl, Zoltán	1.95 m (6 ft 5 in)	88 kg (194 lb)	31 – 28 July 1995
PG	10	(Hungary)	Váradi, Benedek	1.96 m (6 ft 5 in)	94 kg (207 lb)	31 – 5 February 1995
G/F	11	(Hungary)	Rosic, Uros	1.97 m (6 ft 6 in)	91 kg (201 lb)	26 – 26 September 2000
G/F	12	(United Kingdom)	Whelan, Patrick	1.95 m (6 ft 5 in)	96 kg (212 lb)	30 – 25 August 1996
PF	13	(Hungary)	Bognár, Kristóf	2.04 m (6 ft 8 in)	98 kg (216 lb)	31 – 27 November 1994
C	19	(Hungary)	Herger, Salamon	2.08 m (6 ft 10 in)	99 kg (218 lb)	25 – 4 April 2001
F	24	(United States)	Gray, Juwan	2.03 m (6 ft 8 in)	102 kg (225 lb)	29 – 17 November 1996
G	25	(Hungary)	Verasztó, Péter	1.92 m (6 ft 4 in)	88 kg (194 lb)	25 – 29 March 2001
C	30	(United States)	Patton, Joshua	2.03 m (6 ft 8 in)	104 kg (229 lb)	29 – 7 March 1997

Head coach

- (Serbia) (Hungary) Miloš Konakov

Assistant coach(es)

- (Serbia) Marko Čurović
- (Hungary) Gábor Svajda

Legend

- (C) Team captain
- Injured

- Roster
Updated: 4 August, 2026

=== Retired numbers ===
Falco KC Szombathely retired numbers
No	Nat.	Player	Position	Tenure
8	(Hungary)	László Kálmán	G	1992–2013
18	(Hungary)	Zoltán Horváth	F	2008–2009

=== Other notable players ===
To appear in this section a player must have either:
- Set a club record or won an individual award as a professional player.
- Played at least one official international match for his senior national team.

- (Hungary) Benedek Váradi
- (Romania) Antonio Alexe

== Honours ==
=== Domestic competitions ===
Nemzeti Bajnokság I/A (National Championship of Hungary)

- Champions (7): 2007–08, 2018–19, 2020–21, 2021-22, 2022-23, 2023-24, 2025-26
- Runners-up (5): 1998–99, 2011–12, 2016–17, 2017–18, 2024–25
- Third place (2): 1999–00, 2001–02

Magyar Kupa (National Cup of Hungary)

- Champions (3): 2021, 2023, 2025
- Runners-up (7): 1998, 2008, 2009, 2010, 2018, 2019, 2026
- Third place (2): 1997, 2024

== Season by season ==
Season	Tier	League	Pos.	Domestic cup	European competitions	
1989–90	3	NB II/A	1st			
1990–91	2	NB I/B	8th			
1991–92	2	NB I/B	3rd			
1992–93	1	NB I/A	12th			
1993–94	1	NB I/A	8th			
1994–95	1	NB I/A	7th			
1995–96	1	NB I/A	8th			
1996–97	1	NB I/A	5th	Third place		
1997–98	1	NB I/A	7th	Runner-up	3 Korać Cup	RS
1998–99	1	NB I/A	2nd		3 Korać Cup	RS
1999–00	1	NB I/A	3rd			
2000–01	1	NB I/A	5th			
2001–02	1	NB I/A	3rd			
2002–03	1	NB I/A	7th			
2003–04	1	NB I/A	6th			
2004–05	1	NB I/A	6th			
2005–06	1	NB I/A	11th			
2006–07	1	NB I/A	4th			
2007–08	1	NB I/A	1st	Runner-up		
2008–09	1	NB I/A	4th	Runner-up		
2009–10	1	NB I/A	6th	Runner-up		
2010–11	1	NB I/A	7th			
2011–12	1	NB I/A	2nd			
2012–13	1	NB I/A	7th			
2013–14	1	NB I/A	11th	did not qualify		
2014–15	1	NB I/A	6th	Quarterfinalist		
2015–16	1	NB I/A	9th	Quarterfinalist	3 FIBA Europe Cup	RS
2016–17	1	NB I/A	2nd	Quarterfinalist		
2017–18	1	NB I/A	2nd	Runner-up	4 FIBA Europe Cup	RS
2018–19	1	NB I/A	1st	Runner-up	4 FIBA Europe Cup	RS
2019–20	1	NB I/A	1st^{1}	Cancelled^{1}	3 Champions League	RS
2020–21	1	NB I/A	1st	Champion	3 Champions League	RS
2021–22	1	NB I/A	1st	Quarterfinalist	3 Champions League	T16
2022–23	1	NB I/A	1st	Champion	3 Champions League	RS
2023–24	1	NB I/A	1st	3rd	3 Champions League	RS
2024–25	1	NB I/A	2nd	Champion	3 Champions League	R16

^1 Cancelled due to the COVID-19 pandemic in Hungary.

=== In European competition ===
Source: basketball.eurobasket.com

- Participations in Champions League: 7x
- Participations in FIBA Europe Cup: 4x
- Participations in Korać Cup: 2x

Season	Competition	Round	Club	Home	Away	Aggregate
1997–98	Korać Cup	Qual. Round 1	(Bosnia and Herzegovina) Brotnjo	(wo.)		
1997–98	Korać Cup	Regular season (Group I)	(Greece) Aris Moda Bagno	81–97	62–101	3rd
1997–98	Korać Cup	Regular season (Group I)	(Germany) TBB Trier	81-95	108-102	3rd
1997–98	Korać Cup	Regular season (Group I)	(Slovenia) Maribor Ovni	87-73	72-67	3rd
1998–99	Korać Cup	Qual. Round 1	(Croatia) Svjetlost Brod	72-61	85-94	157–155
1998–99	Korać Cup	Regular season (Group E)	(Turkey) Beşiktaş	94–83	71–74	4th
1998–99	Korać Cup	Regular season (Group E)	(Poland) Ericsson Bobry Bytom	71–90	74–84	4th
1998–99	Korać Cup	Regular season (Group E)	(Italy) Pepsi Rimini	85–66	63–83	4th
2015–16	FIBA Europe Cup	Regular season (Group C)	(Belgium) Telenet Oostende	64–86	62–91	4th
2015–16	FIBA Europe Cup	Regular season (Group C)	(Italy) Openjobmetis Varese	75–73	71–94	4th
2015–16	FIBA Europe Cup	Regular season (Group C)	(Sweden) Södertälje Kings	81–85	62–54	4th
2017–18	FIBA Europe Cup	Qual. Round 2	(Bulgaria) Balkan	96-95	84-74	180–169
2017–18	FIBA Europe Cup	Regular season (Group H)	(Russia) Nizhny Novgorod	79–84	92–94	3rd
2017–18	FIBA Europe Cup	Regular season (Group H)	(Hungary) Szolnoki Olaj	84–74	79–89	3rd
2017–18	FIBA Europe Cup	Regular season (Group H)	(North Macedonia) Karpoš Sokoli	108–87	104–43	3rd
2018–19	FIBA Europe Cup					
2018–19	FIBA Europe Cup	Regular season (Group H)	(Hungary) Szolnoki Olaj	66–83	76–79	3rd
2018–19	FIBA Europe Cup	Regular season (Group H)	(Italy) Dinamo Sassari	60–92	69–104	3rd
2018–19	FIBA Europe Cup	Regular season (Group H)	(United Kingdom) Leicester Riders	80–65	95–84	3rd
2019–20	Champions League	Qual. Round 1	(Romania) Oradea	71-62	90-96	161–158
2019–20	Champions League	Qual. Round 2	(Latvia) Ventspils	75-69	73-55	148–124
2019–20	Champions League	Regular season (Group D)	(Spain) Casademont Zaragoza	70–77	69–70	5th
2019–20	Champions League	Regular season (Group D)	(France) JDA Dijon	82–81	68–87	5th
2019–20	Champions League	Regular season (Group D)	(Germany) Telekom Baskets Bonn	91–59	77–91	5th
2019–20	Champions League	Regular season (Group D)	(Turkey) Beşiktaş Sompo Sigorta	79–83	49–74	5th
2019–20	Champions League	Regular season (Group D)	(Lithuania) Neptūnas	97–73	83–87	5th
2019–20	Champions League	Regular season (Group D)	(Greece) PAOK	76–66	89–80	5th
2019–20	Champions League	Regular season (Group D)	(Italy) Happy Casa Brindisi	93–83	92–98	5th
2020–21	Champions League	Regular season (Group D)	(Spain) Casademont Zaragoza	94–86	76–85	3rd
2020–21	Champions League	Regular season (Group D)	(Russia) Nizhny Novgorod	88–93	68–73	3rd
2020–21	Champions League	Regular season (Group D)	(Poland) Start Lublin	84–75	83–59	3rd
2021–22	Champions League	Regular season (Group D)	(Italy) NutriBullet Treviso	81–80	60–68	1st
2021–22	Champions League	Regular season (Group D)	(Latvia) VEF Rīga	68–59	80–74	1st
2021–22	Champions League	Regular season (Group D)	(Greece) AEK	83–78	89–83	1st
2021–22	Champions League	Round of 16 (Group L)	(Spain) Lenovo Tenerife	73–79	62–87	4th
2021–22	Champions League	Round of 16 (Group L)	(France) SIG Strasbourg	63–85	86–98	4th
2021–22	Champions League	Round of 16 (Group L)	(Lithuania) Rytas	86–81	88–91	4th
2022–23	Champions League	Regular season (Group A)	(France) SIG Strasbourg	89–71	78–81	4th
2022–23	Champions League	Regular season (Group A)	(Spain) UCAM Murcia	104–94	74–81	4th
2022–23	Champions League	Regular season (Group A)	(Turkey) Tofaş	64–77	63–90	4th
2023–24	Champions League	Regular season (Group A)	(Spain) Unicaja	78–87	65–88	4th
2023–24	Champions League	Regular season (Group A)	(France) Le Mans Sarthe	75–73	81–63	4th
2023–24	Champions League	Regular season (Group A)	(Greece) Peristeri bwin	87–90	70–87	4th
2024–25	Champions League	Regular season (Group F)	(Lithuania) Rytas	72–82	83–103	2nd
2024–25	Champions League	Regular season (Group F)	(Italy) Unahotels Reggio Emilia	78–71	88–79	2nd
2024–25	Champions League	Regular season (Group F)	(Poland) Śląsk Wrocław	67–74	84–75	2nd
2024–25	Champions League	Play-ins	(Israel) Maccabi Ironi Ramat Gan	88–81	69–76	106–100
2024–25	Champions League	Round of 16 (Group L)	(Czech Republic) ERA Nymburk	86–106	68–96	4th
2024–25	Champions League	Round of 16 (Group L)	(France) Nanterre 92	89–95	71–83	4th
2024–25	Champions League	Round of 16 (Group L)	(Spain) UCAM Murcia	90–104	63–85	4th
2025–26	Champions League	Qual. Round QF	(Portugal) Porto	79–83		
2025–26	FIBA Europe Cup	Regular season (Group H)	(Spain) Casademont Zaragoza	74–90	82–97	2nd
2025–26	FIBA Europe Cup	Regular season (Group H)	(Denmark) Bakken Bears	83–76	90–79	2nd
2025–26	FIBA Europe Cup	Regular season (Group H)	(Cyprus) Anorthosis Famagusta	98–56	87–79	2nd
2025–26	FIBA Europe Cup	Second round (Group K)	(Spain) UCAM Murcia	75–80	67–97	2nd
2025–26	FIBA Europe Cup	Second round (Group K)	(Germany) Rostock Seawolves	77–84	78–75	2nd
2025–26	FIBA Europe Cup	Second round (Group K)	(Poland) Energa Trefl Sopot	83–74	86–79	2nd
2025–26	FIBA Europe Cup	Quarterfinals	(Bosnia and Herzegovina) Bosna BH Telecom	70–78	81–66	151–144
2025–26	FIBA Europe Cup	Semifinals	(Spain) Surne Bilbao Basket	81–98	88–95	169–193
