= Szedeák =

SZTE-Szedeák
- Leagues: NB I/A
- Founded: 1992; 34 years ago
- Arena: Újszegedi Sportcsarnok
- Capacity: 3,200
- Location: Szeged, Hungary
- Team colors: Blue, black, white, gold
- Main sponsor: Naturtex
- President: Péter Kardos
- Head coach: Árpád Simándi
- Website: www.szte-szedeak.hu
Home	Away	Third

SZTE-Szedeák, also known as simply Szedeák, is a professional basketball club from Szeged, Hungary. SZTE is an abbreviation of Szegedi Tudományegyetem, the Hungarian name for the University of Szeged. Since the 2010–11 season, Szedeák competes in the top division Nemzeti Bajnokság I/A (NB I/A).

== History ==
In 2002, Szedeák was playing in the NB I/B, the national second tier division. However, after the season, the men's team was forced to withdraw from the league which meant only youth teams remained. In 2006, Péter Kardos took over the management of the club and made the team return to Hungary's second tier league. In 2010, the club promoted to the NB I/A, the national top league. In 2014, Szedeák entered the national championship playoffs for the first time, losing 0–3 to Szolnoki Olaj.

In the 2020–21 season, Szedeák finished third in the NB I/A under head coach Srećko Sekulović, the best performance in club history.

In the 2021–22 season, Szedeák entered the qualifying rounds of the FIBA Europe Cup, marking the club's debut in Europe.

== Honours ==
Nemzeti Bajnokság I/A

- Third place: 2020–21

== Current players ==
Note: Flags indicate national team eligibility at FIBA-sanctioned events. Players may hold other non-FIBA nationalities not displayed.

Naturtex Szedeák roster
Players
Coaches

Pos.	No.	Nat.	Name	Ht.	Age
PG	0	(United States)	Washington, Desi	1.88 m (6 ft 2 in)	33 – 6 July 1992
F/C	1	(United States)	Roberson, Tyler	2.03 m (6 ft 8 in)	31 – 27 November 1994
G	2	(United States)	Person Jr., Wesley	1.90 m (6 ft 3 in)	30 – 1 August 1995
F	7	(United States)	Nicholson, Kassim	2.00 m (6 ft 7 in)	26 – 28 May 1999
F/C	8	(Hungary)	Bognár, Kristóf	2.05 m (6 ft 9 in)	31 – 27 November 1994
G	11	(Hungary)	Balogh, Szilárd	1.85 m (6 ft 1 in)	24 – 2 September 2001
SG	15	(Hungary)	Szatmári, Zsombor	1.94 m (6 ft 4 in)	25 – 16 November 2000
G	16	(Hungary)	Csornai, Csaba	1.90 m (6 ft 3 in)	23 – 3 August 2002
F	20	(Hungary)	Mayer, Ákos	2.02 m (6 ft 8 in)	27 – 14 June 1998
C	21	(Serbia)	Filipovic, Stefan	2.08 m (6 ft 10 in)	28 – 5 February 1998
G/F	22	(Hungary)	Kovács, Ádám	2.01 m (6 ft 7 in)	33 – 17 March 1993
G/F	31	(Hungary)	Kerpel-Fronius, Balázs	1.93 m (6 ft 4 in)	33 – 15 September 1992
G	35	(Hungary)	Polányi, Kristóf	1.85 m (6 ft 1 in)	25 – 1 May 2000

Head coach

- (Serbia) Nikola Lazić

Assistant coach(es)

- (Hungary) Zsolt Kiss

Legend

- (C) Team captain
- Injured

- Roster
Updated: 5 February 2023

== Season by season ==
Season	Tier	League	Pos.	Domestic cup	European competitions	
2006–07	3	NB II	1st			
2007–08	2	NB I/B	13th			
2008–09	2	NB I/B	9th			
2009–10	2	NB I/B	1st			
2010–11	1	NB I/A	11th			
2011–12	1	NB I/A	11th			
2012–13	1	NB I/A	10th			
2013–14	1	NB I/A	9th	did not qualify		
2014–15	1	NB I/A	8th	did not qualify		
2015–16	1	NB I/A	11th	did not qualify		
2016–17	1	NB I/A	9th	Third place		
2017–18	1	NB I/A	10th	did not qualify		
2018–19	1	NB I/A	13th	did not qualify		
2019–20	1	NB I/A	13th^{1}	Cancalled^{1}		
2020–21	1	NB I/A	3rd	Quarterfinalist		
2021–22	1	NB I/A	8th	Runner-up	4 FIBA Europe Cup	QR
2022–23	1	NB I/A	12th	did not qualify		
2023–24	1	NB I/A	11th	Runner-up		
2024–25	1	NB I/A	12th	did not qualify		

^1 Cancelled due to the COVID-19 pandemic in Hungary.

== European competitions ==
Season	Competition	Round	Club	Home	Away	Aggregrate
2021–22	FIBA Europe Cup	First qualifying round	(North Macedonia) TFT Skopje	92–76 (in Krasnoyarsk)		
2021–22	FIBA Europe Cup	Second qualifying round	(Germany) Medi Bayreuth	77–84 (in Krasnoyarsk)		
