= Arena Savaria =

Multi-purpose indoor stadium in Szombathely, Hungary

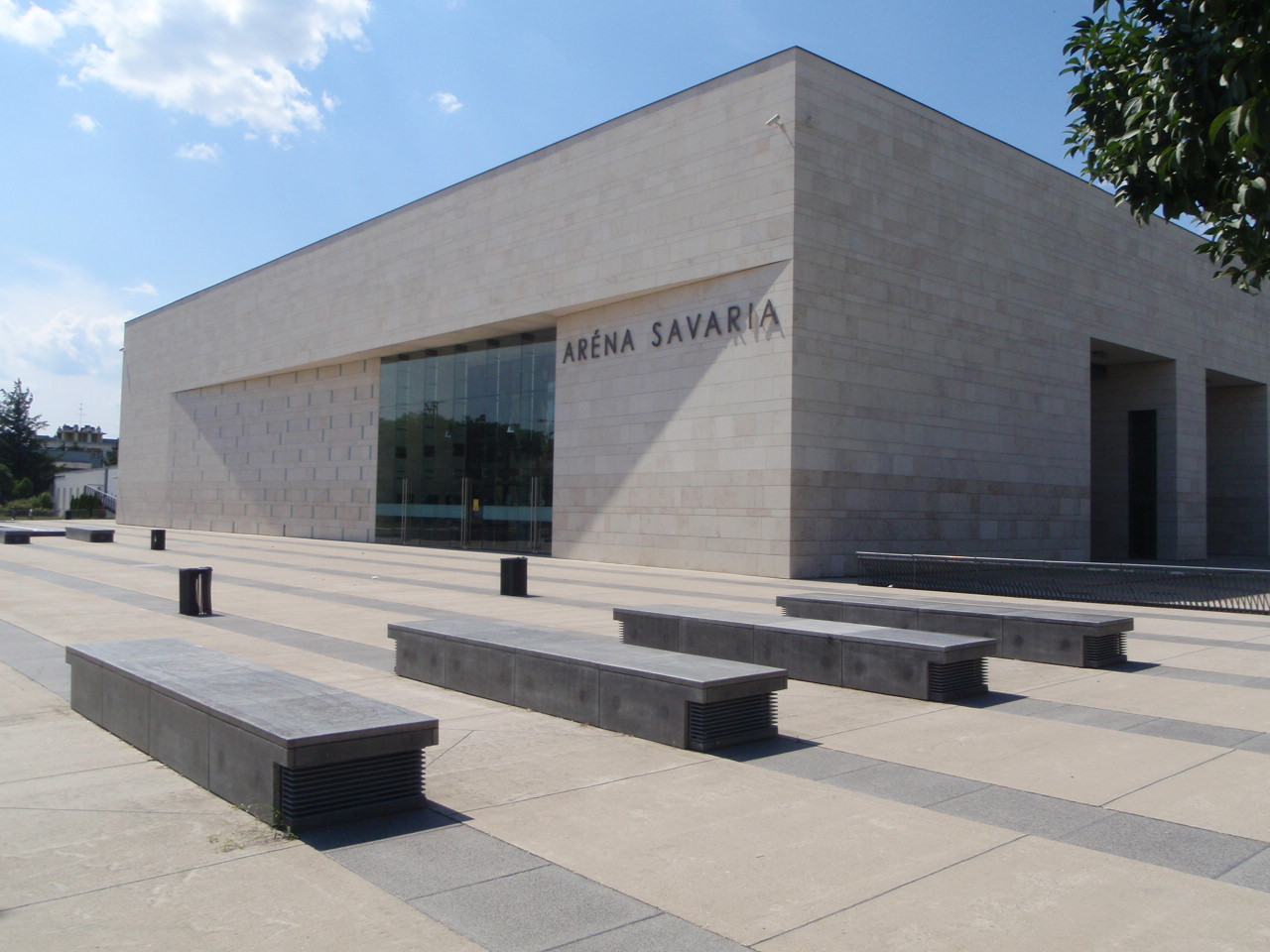
- Interactive map of Arena Savaria
- Location: Szombathely, Hungary
- Coordinates: 47°14′35″N 16°37′9″E
- Operator: Unihall Szolgáltató és Üzemeltető Kft.
- Capacity: 4,000 (basketball); 8,000 (concerts)
- Surface: Parquet
- Field size: 54 x 36 m

Construction
- Opened: 2006

Tenant
- Falco KC Szombathely (2006–)

Arena Savaria is a multi-purpose indoor stadium in Szombathely, Hungary. It hosts a number of sport clubs from amateur to professional level, with 2007 Hungarian basketball championship winner Falco KC being its most notable tenant.

== Features ==
The arena hosts the regional sports medicine complex and it also has an outdoor sports park with a number of sports fields.

Arena Savaria has 4,000 seating places for basketball events, that can be expanded by further 700 seats if necessary. For other events, such as concerts and shows, the figures can go up to 8,000, including standing places.

Other features:

- Recording studio
- Full theatre technic
- 50 language translator system
- Accommodation inside the building of the arena
- Exclusive restaurant

== Events ==
- 2007 Aerobic European Championship
- Pannon Cup – International handball tournament
- Artistic Gymnastics World Cup
- X-Factor Tour – 2010, 2012
- Wrestling Golden Grand Prix
- FIG World Cup
- The Phantom of the Opera musical
- Savaria International Dance Competition
- Thompson concert
- Edvin Marton concert
- Adagio concert
- Horse Evolution Show (2013)
- Michael Flatley – Lord of the Dance Europe Tour (2014)
- EuroBasket Women 2015

== See also ==
- List of indoor arenas in Hungary
