= Kecskeméti TE (basketball) =

KTE-Duna Aszfalt
- Nickname: KTE
- Leagues: NB I/A
- Founded: 2012
- History: KTE (2012–present)
- Arena: Messzi István Sportcsarnok
- Capacity: 1,200
- Location: Kecskemét, Hungary
- Team colors: White & Purple
- Team manager: Jenő Sörös
- Head coach: Gábor Forray
- Website: ktekosar.com
| Home | Away |

Kecskeméti TE, for sponsorship reasons named KTE-Duna Aszfalt, is the basketball team of the Hungarian sports club Kecskeméti TE, based in Kecskemét. The team plays in the NB I/A, the Hungarian first division.

== Honours ==
=== Domestic competitions ===
Nemzeti Bajnokság I/A (National Championship of Hungary)

- Runners-up (1): 2014–15

Magyar Kupa (National Cup of Hungary)

- Finalist (1): 2015
- Hungarian Second League
  - Champions (1): 2012–13

== Current players ==
Note: Flags indicate national team eligibility at FIBA-sanctioned events. Players may hold other non-FIBA nationalities not displayed.

Kecskeméti TE roster
Players
Coaches

| Pos. | No. | Nat. | Name | Ht. | Wt. | Age |
|---|---|---|---|---|---|---|
| G | 3 | (United States) | Townes, Marques | 1.93 m (6 ft 4 in) | 95 kg (209 lb) | 30 – 3 September 1995 |
| G/F | 4 | (Hungary) | Tóth, Balázs | 1.94 m (6 ft 4 in) | 81 kg (179 lb) | 22 – 29 May 2003 |
| F | 5 | (Hungary) | Takács, Erik | 2.00 m (6 ft 7 in) | 88 kg (194 lb) | 23 – 26 September 2002 |
| PF | 6 | (Hungary) | Tóth, Patrik | 2.01 m (6 ft 7 in) | 102 kg (225 lb) | 22 – 19 February 2004 |
| SF | 8 | (Hungary) | Ivkovic, Milán | 1.95 m (6 ft 5 in) | 85 kg (187 lb) | 22 – 24 December 2003 |
| G | 9 | (Hungary) | Tóth, Barna | 1.87 m (6 ft 2 in) | 80 kg (176 lb) | 23 – 9 January 2003 |
| C | 11 | (Hungary) | Karahodžić, Kemal | 2.10 m (6 ft 11 in) | 120 kg (265 lb) | 36 – 26 July 1989 |
| SF | 12 | (Hungary) | Körmendi, Bence | 1.98 m (6 ft 6 in) | 85 kg (187 lb) | 26 – 11 March 2000 |
| PF | 13 | (Hungary) | Kucsera, Dániel | 1.99 m (6 ft 6 in) | 95 kg (209 lb) | 26 – 30 September 1999 |
| C | 14 | (Serbia) | Dramicanin, Rastko | 2.08 m (6 ft 10 in) | 111 kg (245 lb) | 39 – 2 December 1986 |
| F | 15 | (Montenegro) | Borisov, Miloš | 2.01 m (6 ft 7 in) | 93 kg (205 lb) | 40 – 3 September 1985 |
| C | 16 | (Hungary) | Kiss, Dávid | 2.09 m (6 ft 10 in) | 105 kg (231 lb) | 24 – 15 January 2002 |
| PG | 17 | (Hungary) | Wittmann, Krisztián (C) | 1.85 m (6 ft 1 in) | 83 kg (183 lb) | 40 – 22 May 1985 |
| PG | 18 | (Hungary) | Botka, Botond | 1.80 m (5 ft 11 in) | 77 kg (170 lb) | 23 – 4 May 2002 |
| SG | 19 | (Hungary) | Velkey, Géza | 1.95 m (6 ft 5 in) | 73 kg (161 lb) | 22 – 22 April 2003 |
| C | 21 | (Hungary) | Fazekas, Máté | 2.10 m (6 ft 11 in) | 112 kg (247 lb) | 26 – 19 January 2000 |
| G/F | 24 | (Slovenia) | Klobučar, Jaka | 1.98 m (6 ft 6 in) | 91 kg (201 lb) | 38 – 19 August 1987 |
| PG | | (Finland) | Seppälä, Ilari | 1.88 m (6 ft 2 in) | 82 kg (181 lb) | 32 – 27 March 1993 |
| SG | | (Finland) | Järvi, Okko | 1.93 m (6 ft 4 in) | 93 kg (205 lb) | 30 – 12 January 1996 |

Head coach

- (Hungary) Gábor Forray

Assistant coach(es)

- (Hungary) Kornél Váradi
- (Hungary) Gergely Hegedűs
- (Serbia) Dusan Markovic

Legend

- (C) Team captain
- Injured

- Roster
Updated: 24 October 2024

== Season by season ==
| Season | Tier | League | Pos. | Domestic cup | European competitions |
|---|---|---|---|---|---|
| 2012–13 | 2 | NB I/B | 1st | | |
| 2013–14 | 1 | NB I/A | 5th | Third place | |
| 2014–15 | 1 | NB I/A | 2nd | Runner-up | |
| 2015–16 | 1 | NB I/A | 10th | did not qualify | |
| 2016–17 | 1 | NB I/A | 8th | did not qualify | |
| 2017–18 | 1 | NB I/A | 5th | Quarterfinalist | |
| 2018–19 | 1 | NB I/A | 6th | did not qualify | |
| 2019–20 | 1 | NB I/A | 10th^{1} | Cancalled^{1} | |
| 2020–21 | 1 | NB I/A | 9th | did not qualify | |
| 2021–22 | 1 | NB I/A | 4th | Third place | |
| 2022–23 | 1 | NB I/A | 6th | Fourth place | |
| 2023–24 | 1 | NB I/A | 13th | did not qualify | |
| 2024–25 | 1 | NB I/A | 11th | did not qualify | |

^1 Cancelled due to the COVID-19 pandemic in Hungary.

== Names ==
- KTE Kosárlabda Klub (2012–2013)
- KTE-Duna Aszfalt (2013–present)
