= Hübner Nyíregyháza BS =

Hungarian basketball team

Hübner Nyíregyháza Blue Sharks
- Nickname: Blue Sharks
- Leagues: Nemzeti Bajnokság I/A
- History: TK Isobau –2000; Marso NYKE-Isobau; 2000–2001; Marso-Isobau NYKK; 2001–2004; Marso-Carmo Suzuki NYKK; 2004–2007; Marso-Vagep Nyiregyhaza KK; 2007–2013; Marso Nyiregyhaza KK; 2013–2015; Marso-Nyiregyhaza Blue Sharks; 2015–2016; Hubner Nyiregyhaza BS; 2019–present
- Arena: Continental Arena
- Capacity: 2,500
- Location: Nyíregyháza, Hungary
- General manager: Dr. Máté Mohácsi
- Head coach: Darko Radulović
- Website: bluesharksbasket.hu
Home	Away

Hübner Nyíregyháza BS is a Hungarian professional basketball team based in Nyíregyháza. The team currently plays in the Nemzeti Bajnokság I/A, the highest level of basketball in Hungary. The team plays its home games in the Continental Arena. Their nickname is Blue Sharks.

== Notable players ==
Note: Flags indicate national team eligibility at FIBA-sanctioned events. Players may hold other non-FIBA nationalities not displayed.

Criteria

To appear in this section a player must have either:

- Set a club record or won an individual award while at the club
- Played at least one official international match for their national team at any time
- Played at least one official NBA match at any time.

- (Hungary) Gergely Toth
- (Chile) Manny Suárez
- (United States) Nigel Johnson
- (United States) Seth Leday

== Current roster ==
Note: Flags indicate national team eligibility at FIBA-sanctioned events. Players may hold other non-FIBA nationalities not displayed.

Hübner Nyíregyháza Blue Sharks roster
Players
Coaches

Pos.	No.	Nat.	Name	Ht.	Age
G	0	(United States)	Perry, Darius	1.88 m (6 ft 2 in)	26 – 13 March 1999
SG	1	(United States)	Dickerson, DeMarco	1.96 m (6 ft 5 in)	28 – 18 August 1997
PG	3	(Hungary)	Vaskó, György	1.81 m (5 ft 11 in)	25 – 15 May 2000
SF	4	(Hungary)	Szobi, Dániel	1.97 m (6 ft 6 in)	36 – 18 February 1989
F	5	(Hungary)	Mokánszki, Milán	2.02 m (6 ft 8 in)	25 – 25 September 2000
G/F	11	(Hungary)	Bazsó, Brúnó	1.95 m (6 ft 5 in)	30 – 18 March 1995
SG	12	(Hungary)	Kiss, Benedek	1.95 m (6 ft 5 in)	24 – 27 September 2001
C	16	(Hungary)	Tóth, Gergő	2.02 m (6 ft 8 in)	23 – 4 January 2002
SG	17	(Hungary)	Kass, Balázs	1.90 m (6 ft 3 in)	23 – 14 February 2002
G	19	(Hungary)	Végső, Bálint	1.78 m (5 ft 10 in)	22 – 24 June 2003
G/F	20	(Hungary)	Fazekas, Csaba	1.95 m (6 ft 5 in)	26 – 20 August 1999
C	21	(Mali)	Koné, Sidiki	2.11 m (6 ft 11 in)	24 – 21 January 2001
F/C	22	(United States)	Copes, Erik	2.05 m (6 ft 9 in)	32 – 29 January 1993
SF	33	(Hungary)	Bonifert, Bendegúz	1.98 m (6 ft 6 in)	27 – 23 September 1998
F	35	(Lithuania)	Pipiras, Rytis	2.01 m (6 ft 7 in)	30 – 9 April 1995

Head coach

- (North Macedonia) Darko Radulović

Assistant coach(es)

- (Spain) Alberto Ona

Legend

- (C) Team captain
- Injured

- Roster
Updated: March 20, 2023
