= 2023–24 Debreceni EAC (basketball) season =

Hungarian basketball season

Debreceni EAC
2023–24 season
- President: István Becsky
- Head coach: (Serbia) Anđelko Mandić
- Arena: Oláh Gábor Sports Hall
- Nemzeti Bajnokság I/A: 8th
- Hungarian Cup: Quarter-final
Home	Away

The 2023–24 season is Debreceni EAC's the 12th in existence and the club's 7th consecutive season in the top tier of Hungarian basketball.

== History ==
The basketball section of Debreceni EAC was founded in 2012. The club plays its home games at the Oláh Gábor Sports Hall, which has a capacity of 1,000 people. They entered the top division Nemzeti Bajnokság I/A for the 2017–18 season. In DEAC's debut season, the team finished in 11th place.

In the 2018–19 season, DEAC reached the semi-finals of the Hungarian Cup for the first time in history.

== Players ==
=== Current roster ===
Note: Flags indicate national team eligibility at FIBA-sanctioned events. Players may hold other non-FIBA nationalities not displayed.

Debreceni EAC roster
Players
Coaches

Pos.	No.	Nat.	Name	Ht.	Age
PF	0	(Hungary)	Fekete, Csongor	1.99 m (6 ft 6 in)	22 – 19 February 2004
C	2	(Hungary)	Csizmadia, Attila	2.05 m (6 ft 9 in)	23 – 29 November 2002
PF	5	(United States)	Buckles, Rakeem Jamal	2.05 m (6 ft 9 in)	35 – 15 November 1990
SG	7	(Hungary)	Neuwirth, Bence	1.92 m (6 ft 4 in)	24 – 5 April 2002
C	8	(Croatia)	Buljević, Lovro	2.08 m (6 ft 10 in)	27 – 12 August 1998
PG	9	(Serbia)	Tadić, Tadija	1.94 m (6 ft 4 in)	26 – 22 April 1999
PG	10	(Hungary)	Kenéz, Csaba	1.92 m (6 ft 4 in)	23 – 4 September 2002
SF	13	(Serbia)	Drenovac, Đorđe	1.98 m (6 ft 6 in)	33 – 9 August 1992
PG	15	(United States)	Edwin, Deon	1.95 m (6 ft 5 in)	33 – 9 October 1992
C	18	(Hungary)	Czermann, Patrik	2.10 m (6 ft 11 in)	23 – 23 February 2003
PF	20	(Hungary)	Garamvölgyi, Ákos	2.01 m (6 ft 7 in)	32 – 28 January 1994
SG	24	(Hungary)	Mócsán, Bálint	1.92 m (6 ft 4 in)	28 – 18 June 1997
PG	27	(Hungary)	Ságodi, Róbert	1.82 m (6 ft 0 in)	21 – 22 May 2004
PF	28	(Hungary)	Hegedüs, Brúnó	2.00 m (6 ft 7 in)	21 – 18 June 2004
PF	50	(United States)	Williamson, Andre Marcell	2.02 m (6 ft 8 in)	36 – 13 October 1989
SG	56	(Hungary)	Várszegi, Ádám	1.95 m (6 ft 5 in)	21 – 16 July 2004
PG	88	(Hungary)	Hőgye, Patrik	1.93 m (6 ft 4 in)	21 – 12 April 2005

Head coach

- (Serbia) Anđelko Mandić

Assistant coach(es)

- (Serbia) Darko Ivanović

Legend

- (C) Team captain
- Injured

- Roster
Updated: 30 December 2023

== Competitions ==
=== Overview ===
Competition	First match	Last match	Starting round	Final position	Record							
Competition	First match	Last match	Starting round	Final position	Pld	W	D	L	PF	PA	PD	Win %
Nemzeti Bajnokság I/A; Regular Season	29 September 2023	30 March 2024	Round 1	5th	26	13	0	13	1,982	2,034	−52	50.00
Nemzeti Bajnokság I/A; Play-off	13 April 2024	4 May 2024	Quarter final	7–8th place	8	2	0	6	582	660	−78	25.00
Hungarian Cup	24 January 2024	24 January 2024	Quarter final	Quarter final	1	0	0	1	78	85	−7	0.00
Total					35	15	0	20	2,642	2,779	−137	42.86

Last updated: 4 May 2024
Source: Competitions

=== Nemzeti Bajnokság I/A ===
==== Results summary ====
Overall						Home					Away				
Pld	W	L	PF	PA	PD	W	L	PF	PA	PD	W	L	PF	PA	PD
26	13	13	1982	2034	−52	8	5	932	925	+7	5	8	1050	1109	−59

Source: Competitive matches

==== Results by round ====
Round	1	2	3	4	5	6	7	8	9	10	11	12	13	14	15	16	17	18	19	20	21	22	23	24	25	26
Ground	H	H	A	H	A	H	A	H	A	A	H	A	H	A	H	H	A	H	A	H	A	H	H	A	H	A
Result	L	W	L	W	L	W	W	W	L	L	W	L	L	W	W	L	W	W	L	W	L	W	L	L	L	W
Position	14	9	9	8	11	8	6	4	7	10	7	8	8	6	4	6	4	4	4	4	4	4	4	4	5	5

Updated to match(es) played on 30.03.2024. Source: Competitive matches
A = Away; H = Home; W = Win; L = Loss; R = Rest

==== Matches ====
29 Sept. 2023 1	DEAC	59–80	OSE Lions (Oroszlány)	Debrecen
18:00	Scoring by quarter: 11–17, 23–22, 14–15, 11–26
	Pts: Buckles 17; Rebs: Williamson 10; Asts: Kenéz 4 PIR: Buckles 18	Boxscore	Pts: Polutak 19; Rebs: Thomas 11; Asts: Thomas, Hollis-Jefferson 3 PIR: Polutak, Thomas 29	Arena: Oláh Gábor Sports Hall; Referees: T. Benczur, A. Fodor, Zs. Rácz

6 Oct. 2023 2	DEAC	79–71	DTKH Kecskemét	Debrecen
18:00	Scoring by quarter: 28–17, 22–19, 15–16, 17–19
	Pts: Edwin 18; Rebs: Williamson 15; Asts: three players 3 PIR: Edwin 28	Boxscore	Pts: Sinik 15; Rebs: Lawrence 12; Asts: Wittmann 3 PIR: Lawrence 19	Arena: Oláh Gábor Sports Hall; Attendance: 800; Referees: T. Földhazi, M. Makrai, A. Sörlei

12 Oct. 2023 3	Szolnoki Olajbányász	73–66	DEAC	Szolnok
18:00	Scoring by quarter: 23–18, 9–16, 22–16, 19–16
	Pts: Thomas 19; Rebs: Révész 11; Asts: Pongó, Clay Jr. 4 PIR: Thomas 28	Boxscore	Pts: Williamson 17; Rebs: Williamson 12; Asts: Edwin 10; PIR: Williamson 32	Arena: Tiszaligeti Sportcsarnok; Attendance: 1,500; Referees: G. Kapitány, J. Ádám, N. Kovács

21 Oct. 2023 4	DEAC	75–70	Egis Körmend	Debrecen
18:00	Scoring by quarter: 12–20, 16–24, 27–14, 20–12
	Pts: Edwin 18; Rebs: Buljević 13; Asts: Edwin, Buljević 27; PIR: Edwin 18	Boxscore	Pts: Cook 24; Rebs: Tolbert III 18; Asts: Cook 4 PIR: Tolbert III 38	Arena: Oláh Gábor Sports Hall; Attendance: 1,000; Referees: L. Goda, R. Győrfy, P. Németh

28 Oct. 2023 5	NKA Universitas Pécs	75–64	DEAC	Pécs
19:00	Scoring by quarter: 16–21, 21–18, 13–19, 25–6
	Pts: Durmo 22; Rebs: Durmo 20; Asts: three players 3 PIR: Durmo 40	Boxscore	Pts: Drenovac 22; Rebs: Williamson 9 Asts: Edwin 4 PIR: Drenovac 27	Arena: Lauber Dezső Sports Hall; Attendance: 600; Referees: P. Győrffy, T. Söjtöry, Gy. Balog

4 Nov. 2023 6	DEAC	77–61	Kométa (Kaposvár)	Debrecen
18:00	Scoring by quarter: 17–29, 21–12, 23–10, 16–10
	Pts: Buljević 19; Rebs: Drenovac, Williamson 6 Asts: Edwin 10; PIR: Drenovac 38	Boxscore	Pts: Jackson 17; Rebs: Koprivica 9 Asts: Krnjajski 4 PIR: Jackson 33	Arena: Oláh Gábor Sports Hall; Attendance: 1,100; Referees: T. Földházi, M. Makrai, L. Minár

11 Nov. 2023 7	Atomerőmű (Paks)	61–70	DEAC	Paks
18:00	Scoring by quarter: 17–16, 15–17, 18–24, 11–13
	Pts: White 19; Rebs: Nicholson 10; Asts: Ihring 6 PIR: White 16	Boxscore	Pts: Buljević 16; Rebs: Williamson 7 Asts: Edwin 7 PIR: Buljević 25	Arena: ASE Sports Hall; Attendance: 800; Referees: V. Nagy, L. Goda, N. Kovács

18 Nov. 2023 8	DEAC	86–73	Sopron	Debrecen
18:00	Scoring by quarter: 17–20, 18–20, 33–16, 18–17
	Pts: Edwin 20; Rebs: Drenovac, Edwin 9 Asts: Edwin 6 PIR: Drenovac 35	Boxscore	Pts: Griffin, Archibald 18; Rebs: Da Silva 9 Asts: Nichols 5 PIR: Nichols 35	Arena: Oláh Gábor Sports Hall; Attendance: 1,000; Referees: B. Mészáros, T. Söjtöry, Zs. Rácz

25 Nov. 2023 9	Falco (Szombathely)	87–68	DEAC	Szombathely
18:00	Scoring by quarter: 29–16, 22–20, 16–12, 20–20
	Pts: Tiby, Perl 19; Rebs: Tiby 6 Asts: Pongó, Pot 5 PIR: Tiby 28	Boxscore	Pts: Mócsán 16; Rebs: Buljević 9 Asts: Edwin 5 PIR: Edwin 19	Arena: Arena Savaria; Attendance: 2,940; Referees: P. Praksch, G. Farkas, Gy. Balog

2 Dec. 2023 10	Zalakerámia (Zalaegerszeg)	73–71	DEAC	Zalaegerszeg
18:00	Scoring by quarter: 19–17, 21–22, 13–18, 20–14
	Pts: Hicks 20; Rebs: Lekunas 8 Asts: Hicks 8 PIR: Hicks 35	Boxscore	Pts: Edwin 22; Rebs: Drenovac 7 Asts: Edwin, Mócsán 4 PIR: Edwin 33	Arena: Városi Sportcsarnok; Attendance: 1,250; Referees: Cs. Cziffra, P. Frányó, Á. Major

8 Dec. 2023 11	DEAC	93–92(OT)	Arconic-Alba Fehérvár (Székesfehérvár)	Debrecen
18:00	Scoring by quarter: 19–19, 17–22, 16–21, 30–20, Overtime: 11–10
	Pts: Drenovac, Edwin 21; Rebs: Williamson 10; Asts: Edwin 5 PIR: Edwin 29	Boxscore	Pts: Philmore 31; Rebs: Dickey III 9 Asts: Chambers 8 PIR: Philmore 37	Arena: Oláh Gábor Sports Hall; Attendance: 1,000; Referees: V. Nagy, A. Fodor, B. Szilágyi

16 Dec. 2023 12	Budapesti Honvéd	80–60	DEAC	Budapest
18:00	Scoring by quarter: 22–19, 17–17, 17–15, 24–9
	Pts: Brown 36; Rebs: Henry 11; Asts: Dokovic 6 PIR: Brown 35	Boxscore	Pts: Drenovac 22; Rebs: Williamson 10; Asts: Edwin 6 PIR: Drenovac 25	Arena: Ludovika Arena; Attendance: 700; Referees: T. Földházi, I. Nyilas, Cs. Horváth

20 Dec. 2023 13	DEAC	75–80	Naturtex–Szedeák (Szeged)	Debrecen
18:00	Scoring by quarter: 18–14, 15–21, 17–30, 25–15
	Pts: Drenovac 23; Rebs: Williamson 10; Asts: Edwin 9 PIR: Drenovac 38	Boxscore	Pts: Locke 31; Rebs: Bognár 13; Asts: Balogh 5 PIR: Locke 29	Arena: Oláh Gábor Sports Hall; Attendance: 1,100; Referees: T. Benczur, M. Makrai, P. Németh

30 Dec. 2023 14	OSE Lions (Oroszlány)	78–81	DEAC	Oroszlány
18:00	Scoring by quarter: 18–20, 26–22, 15–22, 19–17
	Pts: Riddley 24; Rebs: John Jr. 8 Asts: Riddley, Ruják 3 PIR: Riddley, Polutak 33	Boxscore	Pts: Drenovac, Edwin 18; Rebs: Buljević 9 Asts: Edwin 7 PIR: Drenovac 38	Arena: Krajnyik András Sports Hall; Attendance: 1,087; Referees: G. Kapitány, J. Ádám, A. Fodor

5 Jan. 2024 15	DTKH Kecskemét	84–90	DEAC	Kecskemét
18:00	Scoring by quarter: 20–19, 13–22, 24–21, 27–28
	Pts: Lukovic 18; Rebs: Karahodžić, Lukovic 4 Asts: Sinik 6 PIR: Lukovic 25	Boxscore	Pts: Mócsán 19; Rebs: Edwin 9 Asts: Edwin 8 PIR: Edwin 27	Arena: Messzi István Sportcsarnok; Referees: L. Goda, R. Györfy, N. Kovács

13 Jan. 2024 16	DEAC	80–88	Szolnoki Olajbányász	Debrecen
18:00	Scoring by quarter: 21–21, 16–22, 17–22, 26–23
	Pts: Drenovac 28; Rebs: Edwin 10; Asts: Drenovac, Edwin 4 PIR: Drenovac 32	Boxscore	Pts: Thomas 24; Rebs: Eads III 6 Asts: Pongó 9 PIR: Thomas 33	Arena: Oláh Gábor Sports Hall; Attendance: 1,200; Referees: B. Mészáros Balázs, T. Söjtöry, A. Sörlei

20 Jan. 2024 17	Egis Körmend	70–81	DEAC	Körmend
18:00	Scoring by quarter: 17–18, 17–22, 20–22, 16–19
	Pts: Tolbert III 23; Rebs: Tolbert III 10; Asts: Morgan, Dogo 3 PIR: Tolbert III 31	Boxscore	Pts: Drenovac 23; Rebs: Edwin 7 Asts: Edwin 4 PIR: Drenovac 40	Arena: Körmend Városi Sportcsarnok; Attendance: 1,900; Referees: M. Makrai, P. Győrffy, G. Kapusi

27 Jan. 2024 18	DEAC	85–78	NKA Universitas Pécs	Debrecen
18:00	Scoring by quarter: 17–20, 17–22, 25–22, 26–14
	Pts: Drenovac, Mócsán 19; Rebs: Williamson 10; Asts: Edwin 8 PIR: Edwin 29	Boxscore	Pts: Durmo, Walker 20; Rebs: Durmo 14; Asts: Manjgafić, Kerpel-Fronius 4 PIR: Durmo 31	Arena: Oláh Gábor Sports Hall; Attendance: 1,000; Referees: B. Mészáros, D. Török, Cs. Horváth

3 Feb. 2024 19	Kométa (Kaposvár)	92–85	DEAC	Kaposvár
18:00	Scoring by quarter: 29–18, 21–21, 18–19, 24–27
	Pts: Abell 31; Rebs: Jean-Marie 7 Asts: Krnjajski 8 PIR: Abell 34	Boxscore	Pts: Williamson 20; Rebs: Williamson 8 Asts: Edwin 7 PIR: Williamson, Buljević 29	Arena: Kaposvár Aréna; Attendance: 1,500; Referees: Benczur, Ádám, N. Kovács

9 Feb. 2024 20	DEAC	87–85	Atomerőmű (Paks)	Debrecen
18:00	Scoring by quarter: 23–28, 17–31, 27–14, 20–12
	Pts: Mócsán 24; Rebs: Buljević 15; Asts: Edwin 6 PIR: Drenovac 25	Boxscore	Pts: Clarance 22; Rebs: Nicholson 7 Asts: Ihring 5 PIR: Nicholson 35	Arena: Oláh Gábor Sports Hall; Attendance: 1,200; Referees: V. Nagy, M. Makrai, Zs. Rácz

15 Feb. 2024 21	Sopron	69–64	DEAC	Sopron
19:00	Scoring by quarter: 13–9, 17–21, 17–24, 22–10
	Pts: Griffin 17; Rebs: Molnár 7 Asts: Nichols, Csendes 4 PIR: Mathis 22	Boxscore	Pts: Williamson 17; Rebs: Williamson 6 Asts: Edwin 9 PIR: Edwin 29	Arena: MKB Aréna Sopron; Referees: P. Győrffy Pál, L. Minár, P. Németh

2 Mar. 2024 22	DEAC	85–81(OT)	Falco (Szombathely)	Debrecen
18:00	Scoring by quarter: 14–18, 20–23, 21–13, 19–20, Overtime: 11–7
	Pts: Drenovac 23; Rebs: Williamson 14; Asts: Drenovac 6 PIR: Drenovac, Williamson 32	Boxscore	Pts: Perl 20; Rebs: Tiby 11; Asts: Perl 5 PIR: Tiby 27	Arena: Oláh Gábor Sports Hall; Attendance: 1,200; Referees: D. Tőzsér, D. Török, I. Nyilas

9 Mar. 2024 23	DEAC	51–66	Zalakerámia (Zalaegerszeg)	Debrecen
18:00	Scoring by quarter: 10–14, 12–19, 11–16, 18–17
	Pts: Edwin 15; Rebs: Edwin 10; Asts: Edwin, Tadić 4 PIR: Edwin 20	Boxscore	Pts: Paige 18; Rebs: Ikpe 11; Asts: Keller 4 PIR: Edwin 22	Arena: Oláh Gábor Sports Hall; Attendance: 1,100; Referees: B. Mészáros, J. Ádám, A. Fodor

16 Mar. 2024 24	Arconic-Alba Fehérvár (Székesfehérvár)	101–81	DEAC	Székesfehérvár
17:00	Scoring by quarter: 25–17, 21–23, 29–19, 26–22
	Pts: Roberts 28; Rebs: Dickey III 8 Asts: Chambers 14; PIR: Roberts 32	Boxscore	Pts: Edwin 22; Rebs: Williamson, Tadić 6 Asts: Tadić 8 PIR: Tadić 25	Arena: Alba Regia Sportcsarnok; Attendance: 1,200; Referees: L. Goda, G. Farkas, L. Jakab

23 Mar. 2024 25	DEAC	73–75	Budapesti Honvéd	Debrecen
18:00	Scoring by quarter: 18–20, 22–21, 19–13, 14–21
	Pts: Drenovac 23; Rebs: Drenovac 10; Asts: Edwin 6 PIR: Drenovac 29	Boxscore	Pts: Brown 21; Rebs: Wesson Jr. 6 Asts: Dokovic 7 PIR: Brown 29	Arena: Oláh Gábor Sports Hall; Attendance: 1,100; Referees: T. Földházi, L. Minár, Cs. Horváth

30 Mar. 2024 26	Naturtex–Szedeák (Szeged)	91–96	DEAC	Szeged
18:00	Scoring by quarter: 18–23, 24–28, 27–24, 22–21
	Pts: Locke, Woolridge 19; Rebs: Bailey 6 Asts: Woolridge 6 PIR: Woolridge 27	Boxscore	Pts: Drenovac 27; Rebs: Williamson 9 Asts: Edwin 12; PIR: Williamson 37	Arena: Újszegedi Sportcsarnok; Attendance: 1,500; Referees: P. Praksch, V. Nagy, P. Németh

===== Results overview =====
Opposition	Home score	Away score	Double
Arconic-Alba Fehérvár (Székesfehérvár)	93–92	101–81	174–193
Atomerőmű SE (Paks)	87–85	61–70	157–146
Budapesti Honvéd SE	73–75	80–60	133–155
Vulcano Energia KC (Szombathely)	85–81	87–68	153–168
Kométa Kaposvári KK	77–61	92–85	162–153
Duna Aszfalt-DTKH Kecskemét	79–71	84–90	169–155
Egis Körmend	75–70	70–81	156–140
MVM-OSE Lions (Oroszlány)	59–80	78–81	140–158
NKA Universitas Pécs	85–78	75–64	149–153
Soproni KC	86–73	69–64	150–142
Naturtex-SZTE-Szedeák (Szeged)	75–80	91–96	171–171
Szolnoki Olajbányász	80–88	73–66	146–161
Zalakerámia ZTE KK (Zalaegerszeg)	51–66	73–71	122–139

==== Results summary ====
Overall						Home					Away				
Pld	W	L	PF	PA	PD	W	L	PF	PA	PD	W	L	PF	PA	PD
9	2	7	669	749	−80	2	2	311	338	−27	0	5	358	411	−53

Source: Competitive matches

==== Quarter final ====
13 April 2024 QF-G1	Zalakerámia (Zalaegerszeg) (4.)	87–73	DEAC (5.)	Zalaegerszeg
16:30	Scoring by quarter: 23–16, 21–18, 22–17, 21–22
	Pts: Ikpe, Ostojic 17; Rebs: Á. Tóth 6 Asts: Hicks 8 PIR: Á. Tóth, Ostojic 23	Boxscore	Pts: Edwin 17; Rebs: Williamson 7 Asts: Edwin, Tadić 2 PIR: Edwin 31	Arena: Városi Sportcsarnok; Attendance: 1,600; Referees: P. Praksch, V. Nagy, G. Farkas

16 April 2024 QF-G2	DEAC (5.)	98–93(OT)	Zalakerámia (Zalaegerszeg) (4.)	Debrecen
18:30	Scoring by quarter: 26–19, 25–18, 19–24, 10–19, Overtime: 18–13
	Pts: Drenovac 29; Rebs: Buljević 12; Asts: Edwin 8 PIR: Drenovac 30	Boxscore	Pts: Paige 25; Rebs: Ikpe, Paige 6 Asts: Hicks 5 PIR: Hicks 27	Arena: Oláh Gábor Sports Hall; Attendance: 1,250; Referees: T. Földházi, M. Makrai, T. Söjtöry

19 April 2024 QF-G3	Zalakerámia (Zalaegerszeg) (4.)	82–66	DEAC (5.)	Zalaegerszeg
18:00	Scoring by quarter: 24–18, 13–25, 24–12, 21–11
	Pts: Ikpe 13; Rebs: Ostojic 8 Asts: Hicks 6 PIR: three players 16	Boxscore	Pts: Tadić 18; Rebs: Buljević 7 Asts: Drenovac 4 PIR: Tadić 21	Arena: Városi Sportcsarnok; Attendance: 1,630; Referees: G. Kapitány, R. Györfy, P. Győrffy

22 April 2024 QF-G4	DEAC (5.)	83–79(OT)	Zalakerámia (Zalaegerszeg) (4.)	Debrecen
18:30	Scoring by quarter: 19–8, 19–20, 13–29, 21–15, Overtime: 11–7
	Pts: Drenovac 26; Rebs: Williamson 10; Asts: Edwin 4 PIR: Edwin 34	Boxscore	Pts: Hicks, Paige 17; Rebs: Paige 8 Asts: Paige 5 PIR: Paige 25	Arena: Oláh Gábor Sports Hall; Attendance: 1,250; Referees: Cs. Cziffra, B. Mészáros, L. Goda

24 April 2024 QF-G5	Zalakerámia (Zalaegerszeg) (4.)	75–74	DEAC (5.)	Zalaegerszeg
18:00	Scoring by quarter: 27–20, 22–18, 15–18, 11–18
	Pts: Ona Embo 14; Rebs: Ostojic 9 Asts: Hicks 6 PIR: Ikpe 19	Boxscore	Pts: Drenovac 26; Rebs: Williamson 10; Asts: Edwin, Tadić 3 PIR: Drenovac 24	Arena: Városi Sportcsarnok; Attendance: 1,420; Referees: T. Földházi, A. Győrffy, R. Györfy

==== 5–8th place ====
28 April 2024 P58-G1	DEAC (5.)	62–86	Budapesti Honvéd SE (8.)	Debrecen
18:00	Scoring by quarter: 12–27, 15–24, 18–20, 17–15
	Pts: Edwin, Tadić 14; Rebs: Buljević 5 Asts: Edwin 3 PIR: Edwin 21	Boxscore	Pts: Wesson Jr. 20; Rebs: Henry 7 Asts: Simon 7 PIR: Wesson Jr. 22	Arena: Oláh Gábor Sports Hall; Attendance: 650; Referees: M. Makrai, A. Fodor, A. Sörlei

1 May 2024 P58-G2	Budapesti Honvéd SE (8.)	78–58	DEAC (5.)	Budapest
18:00	Scoring by quarter: 19–23, 15–12, 22–18, 22–5
	Pts: Henry 22; Rebs: Henry 10; Asts: Brown 5 PIR: Brown 30	Boxscore	Pts: Edwin 12; Rebs: Buljević 8 Asts: Edwin 4 PIR: Mócsán 18	Arena: Ludovika Arena; Attendance: 800; Referees: T. Benczur, P. Németh, L. Nepp

==== 7–8th place ====
4 May 2024 P78-G1	DEAC (5.)	68–80	Sopron (7.)	Debrecen
18:00	Scoring by quarter: 16–30, 14–11, 23–28, 15–11
	Pts: Williamson, Mócsán 14; Rebs: Williamson 8 Asts: Edwin 5 PIR: Williamson 25	Boxscore	Pts: Nichols 17; Rebs: Nichols 11; Asts: Nichols 12; PIR: Nichols 39	Arena: Oláh Gábor Sports Hall; Attendance: 450; Referees: T. Földházi, B. Mészáros, A. Fodor

7 May 2024 P78-G2	Sopron (7.)	89–87	DEAC (5.)	Sopron
18:00	Scoring by quarter: 24–14, 25–21, 16–22, 24–30
	Pts: Nichols 18; Rebs: three players 6 Asts: Nichols 6 PIR: Nichols 25	Boxscore	Pts: Mócsán 25; Rebs: Tadić 8 Asts: Tadić 11; PIR: Tadić 33	Arena: MKB Aréna Sopron; Attendance: 800; Referees: V. Nagy, G. Farkas, Á. Földesi

=== Hungarian Cup ===
==== Results summary ====
Overall						Home					Away				
Pld	W	L	PF	PA	PD	W	L	PF	PA	PD	W	L	PF	PA	PD
1	0	1	78	85	−7	0	0	0	0	0	0	1	78	85	−7

Source: Competitive matches

==== Quarter-final ====
24 Jan. 2024 QF	Szolnoki Olajbányász	85–78	DEAC	Szolnok
18:00	Scoring by quarter: 20–18, 16–23, 23–17, 26–20
	Pts: Eads III 23; Rebs: four players 5 Asts: Pongó 7 PIR: Eads III 29	Boxscore	Pts: Edwin 26; Rebs: Williamson 7 Asts: Edwin 8 PIR: Edwin 45	Arena: Tiszaligeti Sportcsarnok; Attendance: 1,500; Referees: T. Földházi, V. Nagy, P. Frányó

== Statistics ==
=== Player statistics ===
==== Regular season ====
Updated: 30 March 2024 • Source: hunbasket.hu

Player	Hungarian League (Nemzeti Bajnokság I/A) — Regular season											
Player	Games		Minutes		Points		Rebounds		Assists		PIR	
Player	GP	GS	Total	%	Total	/Game	Total	/Game	Total	/Game	Total	/Game
Drenovac	26 (100%)	20 (77%)	920	88%	452	17.38	123	4.73	57	2.19	527	20.3
Williamson	26 (100%)	23 (88%)	852	82%	322	12.38	216	8.31	51	1.96	545	21.0
Edwin	26 (100%)	26 (100%)	832	80%	355	13.65	153	5.88	153	5.88	590	22.7
Buljević	25 (96%)	22 (88%)	623	62%	255	10.20	158	6.32	18	0.72	365	14.6
Mócsán	24 (92%)	8 (33%)	697	73%	292	12.17	49	2.04	43	1.79	288	12.0
Hőgye	22 (85%)	15 (68%)	357	41%	53	2.41	33	1.50	17	0.77	62	2.8
Neuwirth	18 (69%)	9 (50%)	178	25%	33	1.83	13	0.72	2	0.11	11	0.6
Tadić	15 (58%)	0 (0%)	299	50%	105	7.00	44	2.93	32	2.13	150	10.0
Buckles	11 (42%)	1 (9%)	186	42%	72	6.55	41	3.73	6	0.55	94	8.5
Ságodi	11 (42%)	0 (0%)	145	33%	26	2.36	18	1.64	18	1.64	45	4.1
Czermann	8 (31%)	2 (25%)	39	12%	9	1.13	8	1.00	0	0.00	7	0.9
Garamvölgyi	8 (31%)	3 (38%)	66	21%	5	0.63	10	1.25	0	0.00	7	0.9
Várszegi	5 (19%)	0 (0%)	18	9%	3	0.60	4	0.80	2	0.40	5	1.0
Kenéz	3 (12%)	0 (0%)	30	25%	0	0.00	0	0.00	4	1.33	–3	–1.0
Hegedűs	3 (12%)	0 (0%)	3	3%	0	0.00	1	0.33	0	0.00	–2	–0.7
Csizmadia	2 (8%)	0 (0%)	5	6%	0	0.00	1	0.50	0	0.00	1	0.5

==== Play-off ====
Updated: 7 May 2024 • Source: hunbasket.hu

Player	Hungarian League (Nemzeti Bajnokság I/A) — Playoff											
Player	Games		Minutes		Points		Rebounds		Assists		PIR	
Player	GP	GS	Total	%	Total	/Game	Total	/Game	Total	/Game	Total	/Game
Drenovac	9 (100%)	9 (100%)	306	85%	142	15.78	28	3.11	18	2.00	134	14.9
Williamson	9 (100%)	9 (100%)	268	74%	74	8.22	60	6.67	12	1.33	122	13.6
Edwin	9 (100%)	9 (100%)	245	68%	112	12.44	31	3.44	32	3.56	165	18.3
Buljević	9 (100%)	8 (89%)	170	47%	40	4.44	51	5.67	4	0.44	82	9.1
Mócsán	8 (89%)	1 (13%)	222	69%	97	12.13	26	3.25	16	2.00	101	12.6
Hőgye	6 (67%)	0 (0%)	48	20%	10	1.67	8	1.33	3	0.50	17	2.8
Neuwirth	9 (100%)	8 (89%)	165	46%	46	5.11	11	1.22	3	0.33	44	4.9
Tadić	9 (100%)	0 (0%)	193	54%	94	10.44	29	3.22	25	2.78	129	14.3
Buckles	0 (0%)	0 (0%)	0	0%	0	0.00	0	0.00	0	0.00	0	0.0
Ságodi	0 (0%)	0 (0%)	0	0%	0	0.00	0	0.00	0	0.00	0	0.0
Czermann	5 (56%)	1 (20%)	68	34%	18	3.60	13	2.60	1	0.20	23	4.6
Garamvölgyi	8 (89%)	0 (0%)	134	42%	25	3.13	22	2.75	0	0.00	37	4.6
Várszegi	5 (56%)	0 (0%)	20	10%	9	1.80	3	0.60	1	0.20	10	2.0
Kenéz	0 (0%)	0 (0%)	0	0%	0	0.00	0	0.00	0	0.00	0	0.0
Hegedűs	4 (44%)	0 (0%)	9	6%	2	0.50	0	0.00	0	0.00	-1	-0.3
Csizmadia	0 (0%)	0 (0%)	0	0%	0	0.00	0	0.00	0	0.00	0	0.0
Hibján	1 (11%)	0 (0%)	2	5%	0	0.00	0	0.00	0	0.00	-1	-1.0
