= 2025–26 BC Žalgiris season =

BC Žalgiris
2025–26 season
- President: (Lithuanian Basketball Federation) Paulius Jankūnas
- Head coach: (Lithuanian Basketball Federation) Tomas Masiulis
- Arena: Žalgiris Arena
- LKL: Winners
- EuroLeague: Playoffs
- King Mindaugas Cup: Winners
- Highest home attendance: LKL: 13,538; Žalgiris 79–75 Rytas (2 November 2025) EuroLeague: 15,428; Žalgiris 85–79 Paris Basketball (17 April 2026)
- Lowest home attendance: LKL: 783; Žalgiris 104–91 Jonava Hipocredit (1 February 2026) EuroLeague: 14,430; Žalgiris 99–67 Crvena zvezda Meridianbet (9 January 2026)
- Average home attendance: LKL: 4,763; EuroLeague: 14,880
- Biggest win: Jonava Hipocredit 73–118 Žalgiris (21 December 2025)
- Biggest defeat: Žalgiris 64–87 Anadolu Efes (17 December 2025)
Home	Away

The 2025–26 season is Žalgiris's 82nd in the existence of the club.

Times up to 25 October 2025 and from 29 March 2026 are EEST (UTC+3). Times from 25 October 2025 and from 29 March 2026 are EET (UTC+2).

== Players ==
=== Current roster ===
Note: Flags indicate national team eligibility at FIBA-sanctioned events. Players may hold other non-FIBA nationalities not displayed.

Žalgiris roster
Players
Coaches

Pos.	No.	Nat.	Name	Ht.	Wt.	Age
PG	1	(United States)	Williams-Goss, Nigel	1.88 m (6 ft 2 in)	87 kg (192 lb)	32 – 16 September 1994
PG	3	(France)	Francisco, Sylvain	1.86 m (6 ft 1 in)	82 kg (181 lb)	28 – 10 October 1997
C	7	(United States)	Wright, Moses	2.06 m (6 ft 9 in)	104 kg (229 lb)	27 – 23 December 1998
SF	8	(Lithuania)	Brazdeikis, Ignas	2.01 m (6 ft 7 in)	100 kg (220 lb)	27 – 8 January 1999
G	9	(Lithuania)	Giedraitis, Dovydas	1.93 m (6 ft 4 in)	93 kg (205 lb)	26 – 17 August 2000
F/C	10	(Lithuania)	Tubelis, Ąžuolas	2.08 m (6 ft 10 in)	111 kg (245 lb)	24 – 22 March 2002
G	12	(Germany)	Lô, Maodo	1.91 m (6 ft 3 in)	82 kg (181 lb)	33 – 31 December 1992
PF	14	(United States)	Sleva, Dustin	2.03 m (6 ft 8 in)	102 kg (225 lb)	30 – 23 September 1995
C	15	(Lithuania)	Birutis, Laurynas	2.13 m (7 ft 0 in)	114 kg (251 lb)	29 – 27 August 1997
G/F	17	(Lithuania)	Rubštavičius, Mantas	1.98 m (6 ft 6 in)	84 kg (185 lb)	24 – 6 May 2002
F	51	(Lithuania)	Butkevičius, Arnas	1.97 m (6 ft 6 in)	95 kg (209 lb)	33 – 22 November 1992
G/F	91	(Lithuania)	Sirvydis, Deividas	2.04 m (6 ft 8 in)	94 kg (207 lb)	26 – 10 June 2000
F	92	(Lithuania)	Ulanovas, Edgaras (C)	1.99 m (6 ft 6 in)	99 kg (218 lb)	34 – 7 January 1992

Head coach

- (Lithuania) Tomas Masiulis

Assistant coach(es)

- (Lithuania) Mantas Šernius
- (Lithuania) Renaldas Seibutis

Athletic trainer(s)

- (Lithuania) Justinas Grainys
- (Lithuania) Nerijus Navickas

Doctor(s)

- (Lithuania) Vytautas Kailius
- (Lithuania) Andrius Aukštakalnis

Physiotherapist(s)

- (Lithuania) Romas Petraitis

Legend

- (C) Team captain
- Injured

- Roster

=== Depth chart ===
Pos.	Starting 5	Bench 1	Bench 2
C	Moses Wright	Laurynas Birutis
PF	Ąžuolas Tubelis	Dustin Sleva	Edgaras Ulanovas
SF	Arnas Butkevičius	Ignas Brazdeikis	Deividas Sirvydis
SG	Sylvain Francisco	Dovydas Giedraitis	Mantas Rubštavičius
PG	Nigel Williams-Goss	Maodo Lô

=== Squad changes for the 2025–26 season ===
==== In ====
No.	Pos.	Nat.	Name	Moving from		Type	Date	Source
1	PG	(United States)	Nigel Williams-Goss	Olympiacos	(Greece)	End of contract	25 June 2025	
7	C	(United States) (Cyprus)	Moses Wright	Olympiacos	(Greece)	End of contract	30 June 2025	
10	F/C	(Lithuania)	Ąžuolas Tubelis	Rytas	(Lithuania)	Mutual agreement	18 July 2025	
12	G	(Germany)	Maodo Lô	Paris Basketball	(France)	End of contract	22 July 2025	
14	PF	(United States)	Dustin Sleva	Beşiktaş	(Turkey)	End of contract	27 June 2025	

==== Out ====
No.	Pos.	Nat.	Name	Moving to		Type	Date	Source
2	G	(United States)	Isaiah Wong	Gran Canaria	(Spain)	Parted ways	11 July 2025	
4	PG	(Lithuania)	Lukas Lekavičius	AEK Athens	(Greece)	Parted ways	28 July 2025	
18	F/C	(Serbia)	Alen Smailagić	Virtus Bologna	(Italy)	Parted ways	9 July 2025	
21	F	(United States)	Matt Mitchell	Bahçeşehir Koleji	(Turkey)	Parted ways	11 July 2025	
42	C	(United States) (Armenia)	Bryant Dunston	Olimpia Milano	(Italy)	Parted ways	11 July 2025	
45	PF	(United States)	Brady Manek	Leones de Ponce	(Puerto Rico)	Parted ways	11 July 2025	

==== Loaned Out ====
No.	Pos.	Nat.	Name	Moving to		Type	Date	Source
24	G	(Lithuania)	Dovydas Buika	Jonava Hipocredit	(Lithuania)	Loaned out	18 October 2025	

== Pre-season and friendlies ==
=== Friendly matches ===
2 September 2025	Žalgiris (Lithuanian Basketball Federation)	75–58	(Azerbaijan Basketball Federation) Sabah BC	Kaunas
	Scoring by quarter: 15–17, 19–17, 18–12, 23–12
	Pts: Wright 15		Pts: Pansa 15	Arena: Žalgiris Arena

6 September 2025	Žalgiris (Lithuanian Basketball Federation)	87–82	(Lithuanian Basketball Federation) Lietkabelis	Kaunas
17:00	Scoring by quarter: 26–23, 21–18, 21–26, 19–15
	Pts: Sleva 17	Report	Pts: Rubit 20	Arena: Žalgiris Arena

10 September 2025	Tofaş S.K. (Turkish Basketball Federation)	78–74	(Lithuanian Basketball Federation) Žalgiris	Antalya
16:30	Scoring by quarter: 21–21, 28–17, 11–15, 18–21
	Pts: Whaley 19	Report	Pts: Wright 16	Arena: Gloria Sports Arena

12 September 2025	Galatasaray MCT Technic (Turkish Basketball Federation)	66–77	(Lithuanian Basketball Federation) Žalgiris	Antalya
14:00	Scoring by quarter: 16–11, 12–25, 19–18, 19–23
	Pts: Palmer Jr. 15	Report	Pts: Rubštavičius 18	Arena: Gloria Sports Arena

14 September 2025	Anadolu Efes (Turkish Basketball Federation)	69–90	(Lithuanian Basketball Federation) Žalgiris	Antalya
16:30	Scoring by quarter: 12–23, 24–14, 17–30, 16–23
	Pts: Dozier 25	Report	Pts: Francisco 14	Arena: Gloria Sports Arena

17 September 2025	London Lions (British Basketball)	63–68	(Lithuanian Basketball Federation) Žalgiris	Stratford
21:30	Scoring by quarter: 23–21, 14–19, 13–17, 13–11
	Pts: Williams 17	Report	Pts: Francisco 15	Arena: Copper Box Arena

== Competitions ==
=== Overview ===
Competition	First match	Last match	Starting round	Final position	Record							
Competition	First match	Last match	Starting round	Final position	Pld	W	D	L	PF	PA	PD	Win %
LKL	20 September 2025	12 June 2026	Regular season	Winners	40	39		1	3,697	3,078	+619	97.50
EuroLeague	1 October 2025	8 May 2026	Regular season	Playoffs	42	24		18	3,627	3,472	+155	57.14
King Mindaugas Cup	21 December 2025	22 February 2026	Quarterfinals	Winners	4	4		0	427	302	+125	100.00
Total					86	67	0	19	7,751	6,852	+899	77.91

Source: Competitions

=== LKL ===
==== League table ====
Pos	Team	Pld	W	L	PF	PA	PD	Qualification or relegation
1	Žalgiris	32	31	1	2920	2457	+463	Advance to playoffs
2	Rytas	32	20	12	2970	2730	+240	Advance to playoffs
3	Neptūnas	32	17 (Note: Neptūnas are ahead of Šiauliai on head-to-head points difference: Neptūnas +18; Šiauliai -18.)	15	2969	2889	+80	Advance to playoffs
4	Šiauliai	32	17	15	2729	2802	−73	Advance to playoffs
5	Lietkabelis	32	15 (Note: Lietkabelis are ahead of Gargždai on head-to-head points difference: Lietkabelis +16; Gargždai -16.)	17	2668	2586	+82	Advance to playoffs

Source: LKL.lt
Rules for classification: 1) Win–loss record; 2) Percentage of wins; 3) Head–to–head record; 4) Head–to–head percentage of wins; 5) Head–to–head point difference; 6) Head–to–head points scored; 7) Point difference; 8) Points scored; 9) Lottery draw (Note: Head–to–head record is used only after all the matches between the teams in question have been played)

==== Results summary ====
Overall						Home					Away				
Pld	W	L	PF	PA	PD	W	L	PF	PA	PD	W	L	PF	PA	PD
32	31	1	2920	2457	+463	15	1	1521	1246	+275	16	0	1399	1211	+188

Source: Competitive matches

==== Matches ====
20 September 2025 1	Jonava Hipocredit	78–87	Žalgiris	Jonava
16:50	Scoring by quarter: 14–22, 11–19, 25–21, 28–25
	Pts: Henningsson, Williamson 19; Rebs: Henry, Stankevičius 6 Asts: Ashton-Langford 5 PIR: Repšys 20	Boxscore	Pts: Wright 18; Rebs: Ulanovas 8 Asts: Francisco 6 PIR: Wright 22	Arena: Jonava Arena; Attendance: 2,200; Referees: Saulius Račys, Dovydas Kairys, Deividas Mačiulskis

24 September 2025 2	Žalgiris	93–72	Šiauliai	Kaunas
18:50	Scoring by quarter: 23–20, 27–9, 20–25, 23–18
	Pts: Brazdeikis 13; Rebs: Sleva, Wright 6 Asts: Francisco 6 PIR: Lô 17	Boxscore	Pts: Brown 16; Rebs: Brown, McKnight 5 Asts: Kariniauskas, McKnight 5 PIR: Brown 13	Arena: Žalgiris Arena; Attendance: 3,299; Referees: Artūras Šukys, Aurimas Borusas, Vidmantas Rušinas

27 September 2025 3	Neptūnas	71–84	Žalgiris	Klaipėda
16:50	Scoring by quarter: 16–23, 17–20, 17–20, 21–21
	Pts: Lomažs, Waterman 15; Rebs: Tucker 6 Asts: Lomažs 7 PIR: Lomažs 20	Boxscore	Pts: Ulanovas 20; Rebs: Wright 7 Asts: Francisco 9 PIR: Ulanovas 32	Arena: Švyturys Arena; Attendance: 4,449; Referees: Artūras Šukys, Dovydas Kairys, Darius Šomka

5 October 2025 4	Žalgiris	98–68	Juventus	Kaunas
16:50	Scoring by quarter: 32–19, 20–12, 25–18, 21–19
	Pts: Birutis 19; Rebs: Birutis 8 Asts: Rubštavičius 6 PIR: Birutis 27	Boxscore	Pts: Vraneš 17; Rebs: Vraneš 6 Asts: Daniels, Johnson 4 PIR: Vraneš 17	Arena: Žalgiris Arena; Attendance: 3,358; Referees: Gvidas Gedvilas, Andžej Urbanovič, Eimantas Vasiliauskas

19 October 2025 5	Žalgiris	85–87	Lietkabelis	Kaunas
16:50	Scoring by quarter: 14–23, 34–19, 13–25, 24–20
	Pts: Francisco 21; Rebs: Sirvydis 8 Asts: Lô, Sirvydis 5 PIR: Sirvydis 22	Boxscore	Pts: Morris 27; Rebs: Three players 5 Asts: Morris 4 PIR: Morris 29	Arena: Žalgiris Arena; Attendance: 4,475; Referees: Gytis Vilius, Artūras Šukys, Gabrielius Simonavičius

26 October 2025 6	Gargždai	73–89	Žalgiris	Gargždai
16:50	Scoring by quarter: 16–24, 17–21, 20–16, 20–28
	Pts: Pipkins 18; Rebs: Griciūnas 11; Asts: Hagins 8 PIR: Griciūnas 24	Boxscore	Pts: Ulanovas, Brazdeikis 13; Rebs: Ulanovas 5 Asts: Ulanovas 6 PIR: Ulanovas 21	Arena: Gargždų Arena; Attendance: 1,500; Referees: Saulius Račys, Juozas Barkauskas, Dovydas Kairys

2 November 2025 7	Žalgiris	79–75	Rytas	Kaunas
16:50	Scoring by quarter: 15–21, 27–17, 22–14, 15–23
	Pts: Francisco 15; Rebs: Sleva 10; Asts: Francisco 5 PIR: Birutis 14	Boxscore	Pts: Harding 20; Rebs: Gudaitis, Radzevičius 7 Asts: Walker 6 PIR: Harding 22	Arena: Žalgiris Arena; Attendance: 13,538; Referees: Gytis Vilius, Saulius Račys, Gvidas Gedvilas

9 November 2025 8	Nevėžis-Paskolų klubas	68–94	Žalgiris	Kėdainiai
19:10	Scoring by quarter: 19–21, 12–24, 25–25, 12–24
	Pts: Ramanauskas 14; Rebs: Muila 8 Asts: Ramanauskas 3 PIR: Perkins, Ramanauskas 13	Boxscore	Pts: Giedraitis 13; Rebs: Wright 8 Asts: Mikalauskas 6 PIR: Butkevičius 17	Arena: Kėdainiai Arena; Attendance: 2,389; Referees: Gvidas Gedvilas, Darius Šomka, Vidmantas Rušinas

23 November 2025 9	Lietkabelis	77–81	Žalgiris	Panevėžys
16:50	Scoring by quarter: 18–20, 19–15, 22–27, 18–19
	Pts: Kullamäe 26; Rebs: Rubit 9 Asts: Bičkauskis, Flowers 4 PIR: Rubit 25	Boxscore	Pts: Brazdeikis 17; Rebs: Tubelis 9 Asts: Francisco 7 PIR: Tubelis, Wright 19	Arena: Kalnapilio Arena; Attendance: 5,181; Referees: Gytis Vilius, Artūras Šukys, Gvidas Gedvilas

7 December 2025 10	Žalgiris	108–71	Gargždai	Kaunas
16:50	Scoring by quarter: 29–22, 27–18, 26–18, 26–13
	Pts: Rubštavičius 20; Rebs: Tubelis, Wright 7 Asts: Williams-Goss 9 PIR: Rubštavičius 25	Boxscore	Pts: Pulliam 17; Rebs: Petrilevičius 7 Asts: Pulliam 6 PIR: Pulliam 18	Arena: Žalgiris Arena; Attendance: 2,999; Referees: Saulius Račys, Gintaras Mačiulis, Aurimas Borusas

14 December 2025 11	Juventus	75–91	Žalgiris	Utena
16:50	Scoring by quarter: 21–24, 27–22, 14–27, 13–18
	Pts: Šaulys 26; Rebs: Venskus 7 Asts: Johnson 5 PIR: Šaulys 27	Boxscore	Pts: Tubelis 14; Rebs: Rubštavičius 6 Asts: Williams-Goss 8 PIR: Birutis, Williams-Goss 17	Arena: Utena Arena; Attendance: 2,462; Referees: Gytis Vilius, Gabrielius Simonavičius, Ignas Jablonskas

27 December 2025 12	Rytas	81–90	Žalgiris	Vilnius
16:50	Scoring by quarter: 20–23, 18–27, 19–22, 24–18
	Pts: Harding 25; Rebs: Gudaitis 10; Asts: Sargiūnas, Wiley 4 PIR: Harding 25	Boxscore	Pts: Wright 15; Rebs: Tubelis 9 Asts: Francisco 9 PIR: Tubelis 18	Arena: Twinsbet Arena; Attendance: 9,186; Referees: Gytis Vilius, Gvidas Gedvilas, Saulius Račys

4 January 2026 13	Žalgiris	112–77	Neptūnas	Kaunas
16:50	Scoring by quarter: 31–25, 32–6, 23–18, 26–28
	Pts: Sirvydis 20; Rebs: Three players 5 Asts: Francisco 5 PIR: Birutis 25	Boxscore	Pts: Lomažs 11; Rebs: Mockevičius 6 Asts: Cleary 4 PIR: Tarolis 13	Arena: Žalgiris Arena; Attendance: 6,176; Referees: Artūras Šukys, Juozas Barkauskas, Gabrielius Simonavičius

11 January 2026 14	Šiauliai	71–75	Žalgiris	Šiauliai
16:50	Scoring by quarter: 20–17, 14–15, 17–19, 20–24
	Pts: Stanley 15; Rebs: Pleikys 9 Asts: Fofana, Vene 3 PIR: Stanley 18	Boxscore	Pts: Sirvydis, Sleva 13; Rebs: Wright 8 Asts: Giedraitis 4 PIR: Sleva 17	Arena: Šiauliai Arena; Attendance: 5,146; Referees: Gvidas Gedvilas, Gintaras Mačiulis, Darius Šomka

25 January 2026 15	Žalgiris	88–73	Nevėžis-Paskolų klubas	Garliava
16:50	Scoring by quarter: 18–20, 22–20, 29–6, 19–27
	Pts: Brazdeikis 16; Rebs: Sleva 6 Asts: Rubštavičius 6 PIR: Brazdeikis 23	Boxscore	Pts: Miguel 18; Rebs: Vaitkus 8 Asts: McLaughlin 5 PIR: McLaughlin, Miguel 18	Arena: Garliava Sports center Attendance: 944; Referees: Juozas Barkauskas, Andžej Urbanovič, Eimantas Vasiliauskas

1 February 2026 16	Žalgiris	104–91	Jonava Hipocredit	Garliava
16:50	Scoring by quarter: 35–21, 21–24, 31–23, 17–23
	Pts: Sleva 24; Rebs: Brazdeikis 6 Asts: Williams-Goss 10; PIR: Sleva 29	Boxscore	Pts: Ashton 19; Rebs: Repšys 5 Asts: Ashton 6 PIR: Ashton 25	Arena: Garliava Sports center Attendance: 783; Referees: Gintaras Mačiulis, Dovydas Kairys, Vidmantas Rušinas

8 February 2026 17	Žalgiris	87–76	Neptūnas	Kaunas
16:50	Scoring by quarter: 19–27, 32–10, 20–18, 16–21
	Pts: Tubelis 16; Rebs: Sirvydis 6 Asts: Brazdeikis 9 PIR: Brazdeikis, Tubelis 21	Boxscore	Pts: Velička 17; Rebs: Šilinš 7 Asts: Velička 4 PIR: Šilinš 20	Arena: Žalgiris Arena; Attendance: 4,155; Referees: Gytis Vilius, Gvidas Gedvilas, Ignas Jablonskas

15 February 2026 18	Gargždai	63–69	Žalgiris	Gargždai
17:00	Scoring by quarter: 12–14, 14–19, 19–18, 18–18
	Pts: Pulliam 12; Rebs: Petrilevičius 7 Asts: Pulliam 3 PIR: Mineikis 13	Boxscore	Pts: Sirvydis 17; Rebs: Sirvydis 9 Asts: Williams-Goss 9 PIR: Sirvydis 21	Arena: Gargždų Arena; Attendance: 1,498; Referees: Juozas Barkauskas, Gabrielius Simonavičius, Ignas Kutka

18 February 2026 19	Nevėžis-Paskolų klubas	67–91	Žalgiris	Kėdainiai
18:30	Scoring by quarter: 16–18, 13–24, 21–26, 17–23
	Pts: Muila 15; Rebs: Muila 7 Asts: Ramanauskas 3 PIR: Pohto 19	Boxscore	Pts: Sleva 16; Rebs: Birutis, Sleva 6 Asts: Giedraitis 6 PIR: Sleva 22	Arena: Kėdainiai Arena; Attendance: 1,672; Referees: Gintaras Mačiulis, Aurimas Borusas, Tomas Stankevičius

8 March 2026 20	Žalgiris	97–90	Jonava Hipocredit	Kaunas
16:50	Scoring by quarter: 24–17, 24–22, 25–24, 24–27
	Pts: Sirvydis 23; Rebs: Sleva 9 Asts: Sirvydis 6 PIR: Sleva 27	Boxscore	Pts: Carter III, Varner II 20; Rebs: Kirves, Kreišmontas 5 Asts: Sidarevičius 4 PIR: Varner II 23	Arena: Žalgiris Arena; Attendance: 2,707; Referees: Juozas Barkauskas, Gabrielius Simonavičius, Deividas Mačiulskis

15 March 2026 21	Žalgiris	98–81	Rytas	Kaunas
16:50	Scoring by quarter: 35–9, 23–24, 25–24, 15–24
	Pts: Wright 16; Rebs: Birutis 7 Asts: Williams-Goss 7 PIR: Wright 24	Boxscore	Pts: Masiulis 20; Rebs: Marčiulionis 6 Asts: Marčiulionis, Smith 5 PIR: Masiulis 27	Arena: Žalgiris Arena; Attendance: 12,903; Referees: Artūras Šukys, Saulius Račys, Gvidas Gedvilas

22 March 2026 22	Žalgiris	94–65	Šiauliai	Kaunas
16:50	Scoring by quarter: 22–15, 23–22, 25–20, 24–8
	Pts: Rubštavičius 17; Rebs: Butkevičius, Birutis 6 Asts: Giedraitis 5 PIR: Rubštavičius 26	Boxscore	Pts: Henderson Jr. 20; Rebs: Stanley 9 Asts: Henderson Jr. 3 PIR: Henderson Jr. 21	Arena: Žalgiris Arena; Attendance: 2,947; Referees: Gvidas Gedvilas, Andžej Urbanovič, Darius Šomka

29 March 2026 23	Juventus	83–94	Žalgiris	Utena
19:10	Scoring by quarter: 25–18, 24–21, 22–32, 12–23
	Pts: Diarra, Vraneš 16; Rebs: Vraneš 6 Asts: Diarra 5 PIR: Vraneš 22	Boxscore	Pts: Birutis 23; Rebs: Birutis 6 Asts: Birutis, Giedraitis 5 PIR: Birutis 33	Arena: Utena Arena; Attendance: 2,312; Referees: Gytis Vilius, Dovydas Kairys, Deividas Mačiulskis

4 April 2026 24	Lietkabelis	82–94	Žalgiris	Panevėžys
17:00	Scoring by quarter: 18–24, 22–24, 29–27, 13–19
	Pts: Morris 22; Rebs: Danusevičius 8 Asts: Morris 6 PIR: Morris 22	Boxscore	Pts: Sirvydis 21; Rebs: Tubelis 8 Asts: Lô 6 PIR: Sirvydis 19	Arena: Kalnapilio Arena; Attendance: 4,206; Referees: Gytis Vilius, Gintaras Mačiulis, Gabrielius Simonavičius

14 April 2026 25	Jonava Hipocredit	84–101	Žalgiris	Jonava
18:30	Scoring by quarter: 20–34, 20–18, 20–31, 24–18
	Pts: Ashton-Langford 21; Rebs: Varner II 8 Asts: Ashton-Langford 10; PIR: Ashton-Langford 32	Boxscore	Pts: Birutis 18; Rebs: Sirvydis 7 Asts: Francisco 8 PIR: Birutis, Sirvydis 22	Arena: Jonava Arena; Attendance: 1,632; Referees: Artūras Šukys, Andžej Urbanovič, Ignas Kutka

19 April 2026 26	Rytas	70–75	Žalgiris	Vilnius
18:50	Scoring by quarter: 21–15, 16–27, 25–19, 8–14
	Pts: Marčiulionis 13; Rebs: Sargiūnas 9 Asts: Sargiūnas 5 PIR: Echodas 17	Boxscore	Pts: Ulanovas 17; Rebs: Birutis 8 Asts: Lô 3 PIR: Birutis 21	Arena: Arena Vilnius; Attendance: 8,179; Referees: Gytis Vilius, Saulius Račys, Andžej Urbanovič

22 April 2026 27	Žalgiris	85–77	Gargždai	Kaunas
18:50	Scoring by quarter: 34–31, 21–9, 14–22, 16–15
	Pts: Francisco 15; Rebs: Tubelis 8 Asts: Francisco 7 PIR: Tubelis 22	Boxscore	Pts: Pipkins 29; Rebs: Mineikis, Petrilevičius 9 Asts: Mineikis, Turner 4 PIR: Pipkins 30	Arena: Žalgiris Arena; Attendance: 1,917; Referees: Jurgis Laurinavičius, Aurimas Borusas, Tomas Stankevičius

25 April 2026 28	Šiauliai	78–91	Žalgiris	Šiauliai
16:50	Scoring by quarter: 24–16, 20–21, 13–31, 21–23
	Pts: Romančenko 12; Rebs: Simanić 10; Asts: Fofana 5 PIR: Romančenko 14	Boxscore	Pts: Francisco, Sleva 19; Rebs: Sleva 6 Asts: Francisco 6 PIR: Francisco 25	Arena: Šiauliai Arena; Attendance: 4,228; Referees: Artūras Šukys, Dovydas Kairys, Darius Šomka

10 May 2026 29	Žalgiris	87–70	Lietkabelis	Kaunas
16:50	Scoring by quarter: 17–15, 26–19, 24–11, 20–25
	Pts: Sleva 20; Rebs: Lô, Sleva 6 Asts: Three players 4 PIR: Sleva 24	Boxscore	Pts: Kullamäe 13; Rebs: Mutić 6 Asts: Radičević 5 PIR: Danusevičius 16	Arena: Žalgiris Arena; Attendance: 4,255; Referees: Artūras Šukys, Saulius Račys, Juozas Barkauskas

13 May 2026 30	Neptūnas	90–93	Žalgiris	Klaipėda
18:50	Scoring by quarter: 22–27, 28–27, 19–28, 21–11
	Pts: Šiliņš 24; Rebs: Tarolis 6 Asts: Lomažs 5 PIR: Šiliņš 24	Boxscore	Pts: Tubelis 16; Rebs: Ulanovas 8 Asts: Williams-Goss 6 PIR: Tubelis 19	Arena: Švyturys Arena; Attendance: 4,094; Referees: Gytis Vilius, Gvidas Gedvilas, Gintaras Mačiulis

15 May 2026 31	Žalgiris	108–93	Juventus	Kaunas
18:50	Scoring by quarter: 20–24, 31–32, 35–20, 22–17
	Pts: Tubelis 21; Rebs: Sleva 5 Asts: Francisco 6 PIR: Tubelis 26	Boxscore	Pts: Beniušis 21; Rebs: Beniušis 9 Asts: Diarra 6 PIR: Beniušis 26	Arena: Žalgiris Arena; Attendance: 2,536; Referees: Jurgis Laurinavičius, Andžej Urbanovič, Ignas Kutka

17 May 2026 32	Žalgiris	98–80	Nevėžis-Paskolų klubas	Kaunas
16:50	Scoring by quarter: 32–18, 17–19, 21–19, 28–24
	Pts: Sirvydis 20; Rebs: Wright 6 Asts: Sirvydis 6 PIR: Sirvydis 26	Boxscore	Pts: Vaitkus 19; Rebs: Klimavičius, Marcinkevičius 7 Asts: Godfrey 4 PIR: Vaitkus 22	Arena: Žalgiris Arena; Attendance: 2,499; Referees: Juozas Barkauskas, Gabrielius Simonavičius, Deividas Mačiulskis

=== LKL Playoffs ===
==== Quarterfinals ====
20 May 2026 Game 1	Žalgiris	102–82 (Series: 1–0)	Jonava Hipocredit	Kaunas
18:50	Scoring by quarter: 22–17, 31–18, 24–17, 25–30
	Pts: Wright 18; Rebs: Sirvydis 7 Asts: Williams-Goss 8 PIR: Wright 25	Boxscore	Pts: Carter III 15; Rebs: Rutherford 10; Asts: Ashton-Langford 7 PIR: Rutherford 17	Arena: Žalgiris Arena; Attendance: 2,111; Referees: Gvidas Gedvilas, Gabrielius Simonavičius, Ignas Jablonskas

22 May 2026 Game 2	Jonava Hipocredit	75–90 (Series: 0–2)	Žalgiris	Jonava
18:50	Scoring by quarter: 14–32, 18–25, 26–15, 17–18
	Pts: Ashton-Langford 28; Rebs: Rutherford 10; Asts: Ashton-Langford 9 PIR: Ashton-Langford 32	Boxscore	Pts: Sirvydis 16; Rebs: Butkevičius 8 Asts: Butkevičius 5 PIR: Sirvydis 19	Arena: Jonava Arena; Attendance: 1,466; Referees: Juozas Barkauskas, Aurimas Borusas, Darius Šomka

==== Semifinals ====
26 May 2026 Game 1	Žalgiris	85–75 (Series: 1–0)	Lietkabelis	Kaunas
18:50	Scoring by quarter: 21–20, 21–20, 21–18, 22–17
	Pts: Francisco 20; Rebs: Tubelis 10; Asts: Francisco 6 PIR: Francisco 22	Boxscore	Pts: Morris 15; Rebs: Danusevičius 12; Asts: Five players 2 PIR: Danusevičius 24	Arena: Žalgiris Arena; Attendance: 2,984; Referees: Artūras Šukys, Gvidas Gedvilas, Gintaras Mačiulis

28 May 2026 Game 2	Lietkabelis	75–95 (Series: 0–2)	Žalgiris	Panevėžys
18:50	Scoring by quarter: 19−20, 17–22, 20–32, 19−21
	Pts: Morris 15; Rebs: Danusevičius 7 Asts: Radičević 3 PIR: Morris 17	Boxscore	Pts: Francisco 27; Rebs: Giedraitis 7 Asts: Lô, Williams-Goss 5 PIR: Francisco 31	Arena: Kalnapilio Arena; Attendance: 2,612; Referees: Saulius Račys, Jurgis Laurinavicius, Juozas Barkauskas

31 May 2026 Game 3	Žalgiris	103–93 (Series: 3–0)	Lietkabelis	Kaunas
16:50	Scoring by quarter: 29–27, 27–20, 19–21, 28–25
	Pts: Wright 25; Rebs: Tubelis 10; Asts: Francisco 6 PIR: Wright 32	Boxscore	Pts: Kullamäe 22; Rebs: Danusevičius 6 Asts: Radičević 6 PIR: Kullamäe 25	Arena: Žalgiris Arena; Attendance: 5,765; Referees: Artūras Šukys, Jurgis Laurinavičius, Andžej Urbanovič

==== Finals ====
7 June 2026 Game 1	Žalgiris	107–75 (Series: 1–0)	Juventus	Kaunas
16:50	Scoring by quarter: 27–13, 18–21, 30–26, 32–15
	Pts: Tubelis 19; Rebs: Birutis 7 Asts: Francisco 6 PIR: Tubelis, Wright 23	Boxscore	Pts: Lewis 18; Rebs: Uleckas 7 Asts: Johnson 5 PIR: Lewis 17	Arena: Žalgiris Arena; Attendance: 6,992; Referees: Artūras Šukys, Juozas Barkauskas, Aurimas Borusas

9 June 2026 Game 2	Juventus	69–100 (Series: 0–2)	Žalgiris	Utena
18:50	Scoring by quarter: 13–24, 17–29, 17–23, 22–24
	Pts: Valinskas 17; Rebs: Uleckas 8 Asts: Valinskas 4 PIR: Lewis 17	Boxscore	Pts: Tubelis 20; Rebs: Ulanovas 9 Asts: Williams-Goss 7 PIR: Tubelis 30	Arena: Utena Arena; Attendance: 3,124; Referees: Gytis Vilius, Saulius Račys, Gintaras Mačiulis

12 June 2026 Game 3	Žalgiris	95–77 (Series: 3–0)	Juventus	Kaunas
18:50	Scoring by quarter: 28−18, 22−21, 21−17, 24−21
	Pts: Sleva 19; Rebs: Butkevičius 8 Asts: Williams-Goss 10; PIR: Williams-Goss 19	Boxscore	Pts: Lewis 25; Rebs: Uleckas 9 Asts: Three players 3 PIR: Lewis 36	Arena: Žalgiris Arena; Attendance: 12,688; Referees: Artūras Šukys, Jurgis Laurinavičius, Juozas Barkauskas

=== EuroLeague ===
==== League table ====
Pos	Team	Pld	W	L	PF	PA	PD	Qualification
3	(Spanish Basketball Federation) Real Madrid	38	24	14	3342	3156	+186	Qualification to playoffs
4	(Turkish Basketball Federation) Fenerbahçe Beko	38	24	14	3114	3061	+53	Qualification to playoffs
5	(Lithuanian Basketball Federation) Žalgiris	38	23	15	3304	3125	+179	Qualification to playoffs
6	(Israeli Basketball Association) Hapoel IBI Tel Aviv	38	23	15	3329	3211	+118	Qualification to playoffs
7	(Hellenic Basketball Federation) Panathinaikos AKTOR	38	22	16	3314	3228	+86	Qualification to play-in

Source: EuroLeague
Rules for classification: Regular season tiebreakers

==== Results summary ====
Overall						Home					Away				
Pld	W	L	PF	PA	PD	W	L	PF	PA	PD	W	L	PF	PA	PD
38	23	15	3304	3125	+179	14	5	1602	1460	+142	9	10	1702	1665	+37

Last updated: 17 April 2026.
Source: Competitive matches

==== Results by round ====
Round	1	2	3	4	5	6	7	8	9	10	11	12	13	14	15	16	17	18	19	20	21	22	23	24	25	26	27	28	29	30	31	32	33	34	35	36	37	38
Ground	A	H	A	A	H	A	H	H	H	A	A	A	H	H	A	H	H	H	A	A	H	A	A	A	A	H	A	H	H	A	A	H	H	A	H	H	A	H
Result	W	W	W	L	L	W	W	W	W	L	L	L	W	L	W	L	W	L	W	L	W	L	W	W	L	W	L	W	W	L	L	W	W	W	W	L	W	W
Position	9	3	1	1	5	4	2	1	1	2	3	5	4	9	6	8	7	8	8	9	9	9	9	8	10	9	9	7	6	6	7	6	6	6	6	7	6	5

Source: Competitive matches
A = Away; H = Home; W = Win; L = Loss; P = Postponed

==== Matches ====
1 October 2025 1	Monaco (French Federation of Basketball)	84–89	(Lithuanian Basketball Federation) Žalgiris	Fontvieille
20:30	Scoring by quarter: 20–27, 15–18, 25–22, 24–22
	Pts: James 24; Rebs: Mirotić, Theis 6 Asts: Okobo 7 PIR: Mirotić, Theis 23	Boxscore	Pts: Wright 21; Rebs: Wright 6 Asts: Francisco 9 PIR: Wright 28	Arena: Salle Gaston Médecin; Attendance: 4,221; Referees: Emin Moğulkoç, Rain Peerandi, Igor Dragojević

3 October 2025 2	Žalgiris (Lithuanian Basketball Federation)	84–81	(Turkish Basketball Federation) Fenerbahçe Beko	Kaunas
20:00	Scoring by quarter: 29–20, 14–17, 22–16, 19–28
	Pts: Williams-Goss 20; Rebs: four players 4 Asts: Francisco, Ulanovas 4 PIR: Williams-Goss 23	Boxscore	Pts: Baldwin 36; Rebs: Horton-Tucker 6 Asts: Baldwin, Hall 4 PIR: Baldwin 34	Arena: Žalgirio Arena; Attendance: 15,203; Referees: Ilija Belošević, Jakub Zamojski, Anne Panther

10 October 2025 3	Bayern Munich (German Basketball Federation)	70–98	(Lithuanian Basketball Federation) Žalgiris	Munich
21:30	Scoring by quarter: 20–26, 13–19, 24–23, 13–30
	Pts: Obst 15; Rebs: da Silva 4 Asts: Obst 4 PIR: Obst 18	Boxscore	Pts: Francisco 19; Rebs: Sleva 7 Asts: Francisco 7 PIR: Francisco 27	Arena: SAP Garden; Attendance: 11,500; Referees: Carlos Peruga, Jordi Aliaga, Josip Radojković

14 October 2025 4	Crvena zvezda Meridianbet (Basketball Federation of Serbia)	88–79	(Lithuanian Basketball Federation) Žalgiris	Belgrade
21:00	Scoring by quarter: 23–27, 22–12, 12–19, 31–21
	Pts: Nwora 24; Rebs: Nwora 7 Asts: Yago, Miller-McIntyre 6 PIR: Nwora 34	Boxscore	Pts: Lô, Butkevičius 14; Rebs: Williams-Goss 6 Asts: Francisco 7 PIR: Francisco, Butkevičius 17	Arena: Belgrade Arena; Attendance: 18,271; Referees: Juan Carlos García, Kristaps Konstantinovs, Guido Giovannetti

16 October 2025 5	Žalgiris (Lithuanian Basketball Federation)	78–89	(Italian Basketball Federation) EA7 Emporio Armani Milan	Kaunas
20:00	Scoring by quarter: 21–13, 21–26, 19–24, 17–26
	Pts: Butkevičius 20; Rebs: Wright 7 Asts: Francisco, Lô 6 PIR: Butkevičius 28	Boxscore	Pts: four players 15; Rebs: three players 7 Asts: Shields, Mannion 5 PIR: Gudurić 21	Arena: Žalgirio Arena; Attendance: 14,920; Referees: Damir Javor, Oļegs Latiševs, Alberto Baena

23 October 2025 6	Barcelona (Spanish Basketball Federation)	73–88	(Lithuanian Basketball Federation) Žalgiris	Barcelona
21:30	Scoring by quarter: 14–26, 25–26, 15–23, 19–13
	Pts: Parra 17; Rebs: Veselý 7 Asts: Shengelia 3 PIR: Parra 20	Boxscore	Pts: Lô 20; Rebs: Wright 7 Asts: Lô 5 PIR: Lô 21	Arena: Palau Blaugrana; Attendance: 4,125; Referees: Sreten Radovic, Jakub Zamojski, Maxime Boubert

28 October 2025 7	Žalgiris (Lithuanian Basketball Federation)	86–65	(Italian Basketball Federation) Virtus Bologna	Kaunas
20:00	Scoring by quarter: 25–11, 17–22, 16–17, 28–15
	Pts: Francisco 23; Rebs: Wright 8 Asts: Francisco 10; PIR: Francisco 35	Boxscore	Pts: Morgan 19; Rebs: Jallow 9 Asts: Pajola 5 PIR: Smailagić 20	Arena: Žalgirio Arena; Attendance: 14,512; Referees: Carlos Peruga, Piotr Pastusiak, Sergio Silva

30 October 2025 8	Žalgiris (Lithuanian Basketball Federation)	96–59	(French Federation of Basketball) LDLC ASVEL	Kaunas
20:00	Scoring by quarter: 26–15, 22–20, 25–9, 23–15
	Pts: Francisco 15; Rebs: Wright 7 Asts: Francisco 7 PIR: Francisco 22	Boxscore	Pts: Watson 14; Rebs: Massa 7 Asts: Atamna 3 PIR: Seljaas 8	Arena: Žalgirio Arena; Attendance: 14,790; Referees: Ilija Belošević, Milos Koljensic, Robert Vyklicky

7 November 2025 9	Žalgiris (Lithuanian Basketball Federation)	86–77	(Spanish Basketball Federation) Valencia Basket	Kaunas
20:00	Scoring by quarter: 18–17, 20–18, 23–23, 25–19
	Pts: Francisco 15; Rebs: Wright 10; Asts: Francisco 7 PIR: three players 19	Boxscore	Pts: Pradilla, Montero 15; Rebs: Pradilla 5 Asts: Moore, de Larrea 4 PIR: Taylor 17	Arena: Žalgirio Arena; Attendance: 15,154; Referees: Damir Javor, Oļegs Latiševs, Thomas Bissuel

12 November 2025 10	Olympiacos (Hellenic Basketball Federation)	95–78	(Lithuanian Basketball Federation) Žalgiris	Piraeus
21:15	Scoring by quarter: 28–14, 22–22, 24–17, 21–25
	Pts: Dorsey 30; Rebs: Hall 9 Asts: three players 4 PIR: Milutinov 29	Boxscore	Pts: Francisco 15; Rebs: Wright 10; Asts: Francisco, Ulanovas 3 PIR: Wright 18	Arena: Peace and Friendship Stadium; Attendance: 12,177; Referees: Tomislav Hordov, Jakub Zamojski, Tomasz Trawicki

14 November 2025 11	Dubai Basketball (United Arab Emirates Basketball Association)	95–89	(Lithuanian Basketball Federation) Žalgiris	Dubai
18:00	Scoring by quarter: 24–34, 21–14, 28–16, 22–25
	Pts: Kabengele 21; Rebs: Kabengele 10; Asts: Wright 9 PIR: Avramović 27	Boxscore	Pts: Tubelis 22; Rebs: Butkevičius 7 Asts: Francisco 9 PIR: Tubelis 24	Arena: Coca-Cola Arena; Attendance: 5,341; Referees: Saša Pukl, Michele Rossi, Marko Juras

20 November 2025 12	Real Madrid (Spanish Basketball Federation)	100–99	(Lithuanian Basketball Federation) Žalgiris	Madrid
21:45	Scoring by quarter: 22–16, 21–21, 19–25, 38–37
	Pts: Maledon 25; Rebs: Tavares 11; Asts: Maledon 5 PIR: Maledon 34	Boxscore	Pts: Francisco 33; Rebs: Tubelis 5 Asts: Francisco 11; PIR: Francisco 37	Arena: Movistar Arena; Attendance: 9,152; Referees: Robert Lottermoser, Miloš Koljenšić, Marcin Kowalski

25 November 2025 13	Žalgiris (Lithuanian Basketball Federation)	82–67	(Spanish Basketball Federation) Kosner Baskonia	Kaunas
20:00	Scoring by quarter: 18–24, 19–18, 17–12, 28–13
	Pts: Francisco 23; Rebs: Tubelis 7 Asts: Francisco 11; PIR: Francisco 32	Boxscore	Pts: Luwawu-Cabarrot 18; Rebs: Diop 7 Asts: Nowell 5 PIR: Simmons 12	Arena: Žalgirio Arena; Attendance: 14,755; Referees: Emin Moğulkoç, Kristaps Konstantinovs, Manuel Attard

4 December 2025 14	Žalgiris (Lithuanian Basketball Federation)	65–83	(Israeli Basketball Association) Maccabi Rapyd Tel Aviv	Kaunas
20:00	Scoring by quarter: 14–22, 16–29, 16–9, 19–23
	Pts: Francisco 13; Rebs: Tubelis 8 Asts: Francisco 7 PIR: Francisco 15	Boxscore	Pts: Walker 23; Rebs: Hoard, Leaf 9 Asts: three players 4 PIR: Hoard, Walker 19	Arena: Žalgirio Arena; Attendance: 14,873; Referees: Saša Pukl, Joseph Bissang, Hüseyin Çelik

11 December 2025 15	Paris Basketball (French Federation of Basketball)	105–108	(Lithuanian Basketball Federation) Žalgiris	Paris
21:45	Scoring by quarter: 29–28, 27–20, 17–32, 32–28
	Pts: Hifi 27; Rebs: Dokossi, Faye 7 Asts: Robinson 6 PIR: Hifi 26	Boxscore	Pts: Francisco 26; Rebs: Tubelis 11; Asts: Williams-Goss 10; PIR: Francisco 28	Arena: Adidas Arena; Attendance: 6,764; Referees: Borys Ryzhyk, Tomislav Hordov, Michele Rossi

17 December 2025 16	Žalgiris (Lithuanian Basketball Federation)	64–87	(Turkish Basketball Federation) Anadolu Efes	Kaunas
20:00	Scoring by quarter: 17–28, 18–9, 16–26, 13–24
	Pts: Williams-Goss 11; Rebs: Tubelis, Ulanovas 6 Asts: Francisco 5 PIR: Ulanovas 17	Boxscore	Pts: Swider 18; Rebs: Poirier 6 Asts: Weiler-Babb 13; PIR: Weiler-Babb 21	Arena: Žalgirio Arena; Attendance: 14,506; Referees: Robert Lottermoser, Milan Nedović, Josip Radojković

19 December 2025 17	Žalgiris (Lithuanian Basketball Federation)	109–68	(Basketball Federation of Serbia) Partizan Mozzart Bet	Kaunas
20:00	Scoring by quarter: 28–15, 25–15, 29–18, 27–20
	Pts: Francisco 22; Rebs: Ulanovas 8 Asts: Lô 6 PIR: Wright 27	Boxscore	Pts: Washington 17; Rebs: Fernando, Bonga 4 Asts: Calathes 8 PIR: Fernando 20	Arena: Žalgirio Arena; Attendance: 14,627; Referees: Mehdi Difallah, Rain Peerandi, Vasiliki Tsaroucha

23 December 2025 18	Žalgiris (Lithuanian Basketball Federation)	85–92	(Hellenic Basketball Federation) Panathinaikos AKTOR	Kaunas
20:00	Scoring by quarter: 28–19, 22–21, 14–23, 21–29
	Pts: Wright 22; Rebs: Wright 6 Asts: Williams-Goss 7 PIR: Wright 26	Boxscore	Pts: Osman 22; Rebs: Faried 9 Asts: Shorts 10; PIR: Osman 28	Arena: Žalgirio Arena; Attendance: 14,815; Referees: Emilio Pérez, Jakub Zamojski, Kristaps Konstantinovs

30 December 2025 19	Hapoel IBI Tel Aviv (Israeli Basketball Association)	80–93	(Lithuanian Basketball Federation) Žalgiris	Tel Aviv
21:05	Scoring by quarter: 25–18, 15–21, 13–24, 27–30
	Pts: Jones 18; Rebs: Bryant 4 Asts: Wainright 6 PIR: Jones 19	Boxscore	Pts: Williams-Goss 17; Rebs: Tubelis 8 Asts: Francisco 8 PIR: Tubelis, Francisco 15	Arena: Menora Mivtachim Arena; Attendance: 10,000; Referees: Damir Javor, Miloš Koljenšić, Eduard Udyanskyy

6 January 2026 20	Virtus Bologna (Italian Basketball Federation)	83–79	(Lithuanian Basketball Federation) Žalgiris	Bologna
21:30	Scoring by quarter: 25–22, 18–12, 20–22, 20–23
	Pts: Alston 20; Rebs: Niang 7 Asts: Pajola, Morgan 4 PIR: Alston 19	Boxscore	Pts: Tubelis 22; Rebs: Wright 7 Asts: Francisco 10; PIR: Williams-Goss 25	Arena: Virtus Arena; Attendance: 7,684; Referees: Saša Pukl, Borys Ryzhyk, Franko Gracin

9 January 2026 21	Žalgiris (Lithuanian Basketball Federation)	99–67	(Basketball Federation of Serbia) Crvena zvezda Meridianbet	Kaunas
20:00	Scoring by quarter: 26–12, 21–16, 21–24, 31–15
	Pts: Tubelis 17; Rebs: Francisco, Wright 6 Asts: Francisco 6 PIR: Francisco 19	Boxscore	Pts: Moneke 18; Rebs: Miller-McIntyre, Ojeleye 6 Asts: Butler 5 PIR: Moneke 26	Arena: Žalgirio Arena; Attendance: 14,430; Referees: Juan Carlos García, Jordi Aliaga, Kerem Baki

15 January 2026 22	Maccabi Rapyd Tel Aviv (Israeli Basketball Association)	100–97	(Lithuanian Basketball Federation) Žalgiris	Tel Aviv
21:05	Scoring by quarter: 27–24, 25–25, 26–22, 22–26
	Pts: three players 17; Rebs: Leaf 7 Asts: Blatt, Clark 5 PIR: Leaf 23	Boxscore	Pts: Francisco 22; Rebs: Wright 11; Asts: Francisco 6 PIR: Francisco 25	Arena: Menora Mivtachim Arena; Attendance: 10,228; Referees: Robert Lottermoser, Rain Peerandi, Anne Panther

20 January 2026 23	LDLC ASVEL (French Federation of Basketball)	77–96	(Lithuanian Basketball Federation) Žalgiris	Villeurbanne
21:00	Scoring by quarter: 18–23, 23–22, 14–30, 22–21
	Pts: Heurtel 21; Rebs: Massa 6 Asts: Heurtel 6 PIR: Heurtel 24	Boxscore	Pts: Francisco 20; Rebs: Wright 7 Asts: Francisco, Butkevičius 4 PIR: Wright 28	Arena: Astroballe; Attendance: 4,637; Referees: Carlos Peruga, Milivoje Jovčić, Stefan Ćalić

22 January 2026 24	EA7 Emporio Armani Milan (Italian Basketball Federation)	82–86	(Lithuanian Basketball Federation) Žalgiris	Milan
21:30	Scoring by quarter: 22–19, 22–26, 23–17, 15–24
	Pts: Shields 27; Rebs: Nebo 11; Asts: Ellis, Shields 4 PIR: Shields 29	Boxscore	Pts: Francisco 25; Rebs: Wright 6 Asts: Francisco 6 PIR: Francisco 21	Arena: Allianz Cloud Arena; Attendance: 4,986; Referees: Mehdi Difallah, Tomasz Trawicki, Thomas Bissuel

30 January 2026 25	Kosner Baskonia (Spanish Basketball Federation)	102–91	(Lithuanian Basketball Federation) Žalgiris	Vitoria-Gasteiz
21:30	Scoring by quarter: 19–23, 27–22, 29–26, 27–20
	Pts: Luwawu-Cabarrot 19; Rebs: Diakite, Kurucs 7 Asts: Luwawu-Cabarrot 4 PIR: Kurucs 21	Boxscore	Pts: Francisco 30; Rebs: Wright 7 Asts: Brazdeikis, Francisco 5 PIR: Francisco 29	Arena: Buesa Arena; Attendance: 8,415; Referees: Saša Pukl, Seffi Shemmesh, Josip Radojković

3 February 2026 26	Žalgiris (Lithuanian Basketball Federation)	104–87	(French Federation of Basketball) Monaco	Kaunas
20:00	Scoring by quarter: 35–18, 21–20, 20–22, 28–27
	Pts: Tubelis 26; Rebs: Tubelis, Wright 7 Asts: Francisco 8 PIR: Tubelis 27	Boxscore	Pts: James 19; Rebs: Diallo 8 Asts: James 10; PIR: Diallo, James 25	Arena: Žalgirio Arena; Attendance: 14,582; Referees: Juan Carlos García, Carlos Cortés, Eduard Udyanskyy

6 February 2026 27	Anadolu Efes (Turkish Basketball Federation)	92–82	(Lithuanian Basketball Federation) Žalgiris	Istanbul
19:30	Scoring by quarter: 25–24, 22–21, 18–22, 27–15
	Pts: Loyd 19; Rebs: Jones 6 Asts: Lee 8 PIR: Loyd 27	Boxscore	Pts: Tubelis 22; Rebs: three players 5 Asts: Francisco 5 PIR: Tubelis 26	Arena: Turkcell Basketball Development Center; Attendance: 5,119; Referees: Damir Javor, Joseph Bissang, Vasiliki Tsaroucha

13 February 2026 28	Žalgiris (Lithuanian Basketball Federation)	93–82	(Israeli Basketball Association) Hapoel IBI Tel Aviv	Kaunas
20:00	Scoring by quarter: 24–20, 20–23, 19–19, 30–20
	Pts: Wright 25; Rebs: Wright 6 Asts: Lô 7 PIR: Wright 34	Boxscore	Pts: Oturu 22; Rebs: Bryant 7 Asts: Bryant, Micić 4 PIR: Oturu 25	Arena: Žalgirio Arena; Attendance: 14,708; Referees: Robert Lottermoser, Borys Ryzhyk, Uroš Obrknežević

25 February 2026 29	Žalgiris (Lithuanian Basketball Federation)	99–94(OT)	(Hellenic Basketball Federation) Olympiacos	Kaunas
20:00	Scoring by quarter: 18–18, 19–21, 14–21, 22–13, Overtime: 9–9, 17–12
	Pts: Francisco, Williams-Goss 23; Rebs: Wright 13; Asts: Francisco 7 PIR: Francisco 36	Boxscore	Pts: Fournier 32; Rebs: Fournier 9 Asts: Jones 6 PIR: Jones 29	Arena: Žalgirio Arena; Attendance: 14,880; Referees: Ilija Belošević, Marcin Kowalski, Alberto Baena

5 March 2026 30	Valencia Basket (Spanish Basketball Federation)	91–87	(Lithuanian Basketball Federation) Žalgiris	Valencia
21:30	Scoring by quarter: 25–13, 25–26, 21–25, 20–23
	Pts: Moore 16; Rebs: Key, Pradilla 6 Asts: four players 3 PIR: Moore, Reuvers 18	Boxscore	Pts: Wright 20; Rebs: Wright 9 Asts: Lô 7 PIR: Wright 27	Arena: Roig Arena; Attendance: 11,966; Referees: Damir Javor, Joseph Bissang, Piotr Pastusiak

12 March 2026 31	Panathinaikos AKTOR (Hellenic Basketball Federation)	92–88	(Lithuanian Basketball Federation) Žalgiris	Marousi
21:15	Scoring by quarter: 24–27, 20–13, 21–19, 27–29
	Pts: Osman 24; Rebs: Hernangómez 9 Asts: Grant 5 PIR: Osman 36	Boxscore	Pts: Francisco 23; Rebs: Birutis, Lô 5 Asts: Francisco, Williams-Goss 4 PIR: Francisco 28	Arena: Telekom Center Athens; Attendance: 18,913; Referees: Carlos Peruga, Rain Peerandi, Manuel Attard

20 March 2026 32	Žalgiris (Lithuanian Basketball Federation)	87–85	(Spanish Basketball Federation) Real Madrid	Kaunas
20:00	Scoring by quarter: 25–29, 28–26, 15–17, 19–13
	Pts: Francisco 20; Rebs: Tubelis 9 Asts: Williams-Goss 10; PIR: Francisco 22	Boxscore	Pts: Hezonja 18; Rebs: Tavares 10; Asts: Abalde, Llull 4 PIR: Tavares 25	Arena: Žalgiris Arena; Attendance: 15,316; Referees: Sreten Radovic, Borys Ryzhyk, Miloš Koljenšić

24 March 2026 33	Žalgiris (Lithuanian Basketball Federation)	78–71	(German Basketball Federation) Bayern Munich	Kaunas
20:00	Scoring by quarter: 18–18, 16–20, 29–19, 15–14
	Pts: Tubelis 21; Rebs: Wright 7 Asts: Francisco 7 PIR: Wright 23	Boxscore	Pts: da Silva 12; Rebs: da Silva 10; Asts: Rathan-Mayes 3 PIR: da Silva 14	Arena: Žalgirio Arena; Attendance: 14,777; Referees: Juan Carlos García, Sašo Petek, Tomasz Trawicki

27 March 2026 34	Fenerbahçe Beko (Turkish Basketball Federation)	82–92	(Lithuanian Basketball Federation) Žalgiris	Istanbul
19:45	Scoring by quarter: 25–22, 19–27, 18–17, 20–26
	Pts: Baldwin 19; Rebs: Jantunen 7 Asts: Baldwin, Hall 4 PIR: Baldwin 19	Boxscore	Pts: Sleva 18; Rebs: Butkevičius 8 Asts: Francisco 8 PIR: Butkevičius 23	Arena: Ülker Sports and Event Hall; Attendance: 11,913; Referees: Tomislav Hordov, Joseph Bissang, Igor Dragojević

2 April 2026 35	Žalgiris (Lithuanian Basketball Federation)	83–71	(Spanish Basketball Federation) Barcelona	Kaunas
20:00	Scoring by quarter: 22–21, 17–19, 20–16, 24'–15
	Pts: Wright 18; Rebs: Wright 11; Asts: Francisco 8 PIR: Wright 28	Boxscore	Pts: Punter 16; Rebs: Shengelia, Parra 4 Asts: Satoranský 4 PIR: Punter 13	Arena: Žalgiris Arena; Attendance: 15,278; Referees: Damir Javor, Luka Kardum, Eduard Udyanskyy

7 April 2026 36	Žalgiris (Lithuanian Basketball Federation)	65–77	(United Arab Emirates Basketball Association) Dubai Basketball	Kaunas
20:00	Scoring by quarter: 19–14, 15–10, 19–15, 12–38
	Pts: Wright 15; Rebs: Butkevičius 9 Asts: Francisco 6 PIR: Butkevičius 22	Boxscore	Pts: Avramović 15; Rebs: three player 6 Asts: Wright IV 6 PIR: Caboclo 21	Arena: Žalgirio Arena; Attendance: 15,080; Referees: Carlos Peruga, Milivoje Jovčić, Hüseyin Çelik

10 April 2026 37	Partizan Mozzart Bet (Basketball Federation of Serbia)	74–83	(Lithuanian Basketball Federation) Žalgiris	Belgrade
21:30	Scoring by quarter: 22–26, 19–22, 16–15, 17–20
	Pts: Jones 15; Rebs: Fernando, Osetkowski 9 Asts: Jones 4 PIR: Bonga, Fernando 14	Boxscore	Pts: Francisco 18; Rebs: Wright 11; Asts: Francisco 6 PIR: Francisco 20	Arena: Belgrade Arena; Attendance: 20,006; Referees: Juan Carlos García, Seffi Shemmesh, Sergio Manuel

17 April 2026 38	Žalgiris (Lithuanian Basketball Federation)	85–79	(French Federation of Basketball) Paris Basketball	Kaunas
20:00	Scoring by quarter: 26–28, 27–17, 15–16, 17–18
	Pts: Francisco, Lô 21; Rebs: Wright 18; Asts: Francisco 5 PIR: Wright 43	Boxscore	Pts: Robinson 17; Rebs: five player 4 Asts: Robinson 8 PIR: Robinson, Stevens 21	Arena: Žalgirio Arena; Attendance: 15,428; Referees: Saša Pukl, Oļegs Latiševs, Anne Panther

==== EuroLeague Playoffs ====
===== Playoff series =====
28 April 2026 1	Fenerbahçe Beko (Turkish Basketball Federation)	89–78 (Series: 1–0)	(Lithuanian Basketball Federation) Žalgiris	Istanbul
20:45	Scoring by quarter: 22–20, 25–9, 18–28, 24–21
	Pts: Biberović 26; Rebs: Baldwin IV, Melli 5 Asts: Baldwin IV, de Colo 4 PIR: Baldwin IV, Biberović 22	Boxscore	Pts: Williams-Goss 24; Rebs: Wright 5 Asts: Francisco, Williams-Goss 6 PIR: Williams-Goss 24	Arena: Ülker Sports and Event Hall; Attendance: 12,571; Referees: Carlos Peruga, Borys Ryzhyk, Thomas Bissuel

30 April 2026 2	Fenerbahçe Beko (Turkish Basketball Federation)	86–74 (Series: 2–0)	(Lithuanian Basketball Federation) Žalgiris	Istanbul
20:45	Scoring by quarter: 26–14, 25–19, 15–14, 20–27
	Pts: Melli 17; Rebs: Birch 7 Asts: Baldwin IV 7 PIR: Jantunen 23	Boxscore	Pts: Tubelis, Wright 16; Rebs: Four players 3 Asts: Francisco, Williams-Goss 6 PIR: Tubelis 19	Arena: Ülker Sports and Event Hall; Attendance: 12,873; Referees: Miguel Ángel Pérez, Juan Carlos García, Milos Koljensic

6 May 2026 3	Žalgiris (Lithuanian Basketball Federation)	81–78 (Series: 1–2)	(Turkish Basketball Federation) Fenerbahçe Beko	Kaunas
20:00	Scoring by quarter: 12–25, 23–17, 22–20, 24–16
	Pts: Tubelis 26; Rebs: Francisco 7 Asts: Francisco 8 PIR: Tubelis 31	Boxscore	Pts: Baldwin IV 16; Rebs: Melli 5 Asts: Baldwin IV 5 PIR: Baldwin IV 16	Arena: Žalgirio Arena; Attendance: 14,792; Referees: Emilio Pérez, Mehdi Difallah, Sergio Silva

8 May 2026 4	Žalgiris (Lithuanian Basketball Federation)	90–94(OT) (Series: 1–3)	(Turkish Basketball Federation) Fenerbahçe Beko	Kaunas
20:00	Scoring by quarter: 20–25, 22–22, 20–14, 18–19, Overtime: 10–14
	Pts: Francisco 23; Rebs: Wright 7 Asts: Francisco 11; PIR: Francisco 27	Boxscore	Pts: Horton-Tucker 21; Rebs: Birch 13; Asts: Baldwin IV 5 PIR: Birch 31	Arena: Žalgirio Arena; Attendance: 15,063; Referees: Ilija Belošević, Juan Carlos García, Carlos Cortés

=== King Mindaugas Cup ===
==== Quarterfinals ====
21 December 2025 Game 1	Jonava Hipocredit	73–118	Žalgiris	Panevėžys
19:00	Scoring by quarter: 21–33, 10–25, 19–35, 23–25
	Pts: Ashton, Slavinskas 12; Rebs: Henry 4 Asts: Ashton 6 PIR: Slavinskas 16	Boxscore	Pts: Tubelis 20; Rebs: Birutis 8 Asts: Butkevičius 6 PIR: Tubelis 25	Arena: Kalnapilio Arena; Attendance: 535; Referees: Gintaras Mačiulis, Dovydas Kairys, Ignas Kutka

17 January 2026 Game 2	Žalgiris	89–63 (207–136 agg.)	Jonava Hipocredit	Garliava
18:30	Scoring by quarter: 17–16, 26–13, 26–19, 20–15
	Pts: Rubštavičius 16; Rebs: three players 7 Asts: Lô 4 PIR: Rubštavičius 18	Boxscore	Pts: Carter III 13; Rebs: Kirves 6 Asts: Ashton-Langford 5 PIR: Krikke 14	Arena: Garliava Arena; Attendance: 711; Referees: Juozas Barkauskas, Aurimas Borusas, Jonas Lazauskas

==== Final Four ====
21 February 2026 Semifinals	Žalgiris	119–81	Neptūnas	Šiauliai
15:15	Scoring by quarter: 31–22, 25–22, 35–20, 28–17
	Pts: Sleva 23; Rebs: Tubelis 7 Asts: Lô 9 PIR: Tubelis 29	Boxscore	Pts: Lomažs 17; Rebs: Šiliņš 5 Asts: Velička 5 PIR: Lomažs 16	Arena: Šiauliai Arena; Attendance: 5,380; Referees: Artūras Šukys, Gvidas Gedvilas, Andžej Urbanovič

22 February 2026 Final	Žalgiris	101–85	Rytas	Šiauliai
18:00	Scoring by quarter: 25–21, 37–16, 22–27, 17–21
	Pts: Wright 27; Rebs: Wright, Lô 6 Asts: Francisco 10; PIR: Francisco 33	Boxscore	Pts: Sargiūnas 16; Rebs: Gudaitis 6 Asts: Smith 6 PIR: Smith 18	Arena: Šiauliai Arena; Attendance: 5,450; Referees: Gytis Vilius, Artūras Šukys, Saulius Račys

== Statistics ==
=== LKL ===
Player	GP	GS	MPG	2FG%	3FG%	FT%	RPG	APG	SPG	BPG	PPG	PIR
Nigel Williams-Goss	23	21	18:03	54.1%	32.6%	67.6%	2	5.6	1	–	6.4	9.8
Majus Bulanovas	5	0	5:27	25%	33.3%	100%	0.6	–	0.2	–	2	-0.2
Sylvain Francisco	30	19	19:06	48.7%	38.8%	74%	1.7	4.7	0.8	0.3	11.8	12.8
Kajus Mikalauskas	17	1	7:43	31%	20%	50%	0.9	0.9	0.1	–	1.6	0.1
Moses Wright	34	17	17:44	67.3%	21.4%	65.7%	4.6	1	0.4	1	10.2	13.2
Ignas Brazdeikis	33	11	16:43	61.3%	33.7%	71.1%	2.4	1.5	0.5	0.1	8	8.4
Dovydas Giedraitis	26	9	19:56	48.6%	41.8%	72.5%	2.2	2.9	0.7	–	6.5	7.6
Ąžuolas Tubelis	32	18	19:52	70.1%	30.6%	84.2%	4.7	1.3	0.7	0.4	12.9	16.3
Maodo Lô	29	7	15:11	41.4%	41.3%	81.8%	1.6	2.9	0.6	0.2	5.7	6.2
Dustin Sleva	39	17	18:14	66.4%	43.8%	90.7%	3.8	1.4	0.6	0.2	9	10.3
Laurynas Birutis	38	23	15:38	71.1%	–	51.1%	4.3	0.7	0.2	0.7	8.7	11.5
Ignas Štombergas	7	0	4:29	87.5%	–	50%	1.3	0.1	–	0.3	2.4	3.3
Mantas Rubštavičius	30	11	14:55	51.1%	45.3%	84.1%	2.3	1.7	0.3	–	7.6	8.5
Dovydas Buika	1	0	4:31	–	–	–	–	–	–	–	–	-3
Dominykas Daubaris	7	0	10:01	42.9%	25%	75%	2.6	0.4	–	0.7	2.6	3.3
Arnas Butkevičius	34	21	17:25	48.8%	30.9%	84.1%	3.6	1.8	0.7	0.3	4.2	7.3
Dominykas Grunkis	3	0	4:13	–	–	83.3%	–	1	–	–	1.7	-0.7
Deividas Sirvydis	38	16	20:30	64%	36.5%	76.7%	2.8	2.1	0.5	0.2	10.6	10.4
Edgaras Ulanovas	39	9	21:21	57%	39.1%	76.6%	3.5	2.2	0.4	0.1	7.8	11
TOTAL				60.9%	37.7%	74%	38	23.4	6.1	3.2	92.4	114.4

Source: LKL

=== EuroLeague ===
Player	GP	GS	MPG	2FG%	3FG%	FT%	RPG	APG	SPG	BPG	PPG	PIR
Nigel Williams-Goss	31	29	24:03	48.7%	38.5%	78.7%	2.4	3.9	0.9	0.1	11.5	11
Sylvain Francisco	42	35	27:46	51.3%	38.6%	79.9%	2.9	6.5	1	0.3	16.5	19.2
Kajus Mikalauskas	2	0	9:04	50%	33.3%	–	0.5	2.5	1	–	2.5	4.5
Moses Wright	42	29	23:38	63.4%	30.6%	73.3%	6.5	0.8	0.6	0.9	13.2	17.1
Ignas Brazdeikis	38	16	14:46	38.3%	33.8%	76.9%	1.9	0.8	0.2	0.1	4.8	3.1
Dovydas Giedraitis	20	4	12:29	50%	28.6%	50%	1.4	1.2	0.4	–	1.8	1.8
Ąžuolas Tubelis	42	36	22:41	63.4%	40.5%	71%	4.5	0.8	0.5	0.7	12.1	12.7
Maodo Lô	41	5	18:01	50%	39.1%	80%	1.9	2.4	0.5	–	7	7
Dustin Sleva	42	7	18:19	43.1%	40.8%	74.6%	3.4	1	0.6	0.1	6.7	6
Laurynas Birutis	41	10	9:59	69.2%	–	40.7%	2.4	0.3	0.2	0.3	4.1	5.2
Mantas Rubštavičius	17	0	4:19	22.2%	43.8%	100%	0.6	0.2	0.1	–	1.8	0.9
Arnas Butkevičius	38	24	18:02	62.7%	50.6%	82.6%	2.6	1.2	0.9	0.2	5.3	7.6
Deividas Sirvydis	27	5	12:16	50%	29.7%	93.3%	1.4	0.9	0.3	0.1	4.2	3.5
Edgaras Ulanovas	42	10	18:33	46.6%	41.3%	80.7%	2.2	1.5	0.3	0.1	5.5	6.6
TOTAL				54.8%	38.7%	74.9%	34.8	19.4	5.9	2.8	87	98

Source: EuroLeague
