= 2023–24 Nemzeti Bajnokság I/A (men's basketball) =

Tippmix Férfi NB I/A^{1}
- Season: 2023–24
- Dates: 29 September 2023 – 20 May 2024
- Teams: 14
- TV partner: M4 Sport

Regular season
- Top seed: Falco-Vulcano Energia KC Szombathely

Finals
- Champions: Falco-Vulcano Energia KC Szombathely (6th title)
- Runners-up: NHSZ-Szolnoki Olajbányász
- Third place: Arconic-Alba Fehérvár
- Fourth place: Zalakerámia ZTE KK
- ^{1} Sponsored league name, referring to Tippmix.

The 2023–24 Nemzeti Bajnokság I/A season, also known as Tippmix Férfi NB I/A for sponsorship reasons, is the 93rd season of the Nemzeti Bajnokság I/A, the highest professional basketball league in Hungary. Falco Vulcano is the defending champion. It started on 29 September 2023 with the first round of the regular season and will end in May 2024 with the last game of the finals.

== Teams ==
=== Team changes ===
Promoted from 2022–23 Nemzeti Bajnokság I/B	Relegated from 2022–23 Nemzeti Bajnokság I/A
NKA Universitas Pécs	Hübner Nyíregyháza BS

=== Arenas and locations ===
Location of teams in 2023–24 Nemzeti Bajnokság I/A

The following 14 clubs compete in the Nemzeti Bajnokság I/A during the 2023–24 season:

Team	City	Arena	Capacity	2022–23
Alba Fehérvár	Székesfehérvár	Alba Regia Sportcsarnok	1,850	2nd
Atomerőmű SE	Paks	ASE Sportcsarnok	1,560	10th
DEAC	Debrecen	Oláh Gábor utcai Sportcsarnok	1,500	6th
Falco Szombathely	Szombathely	Arena Savaria	3,500	1st
Budapesti Honvéd	Budapest	Ludovika Aréna	1,350	13th
Kaposvári KK	Kaposvár	Kaposvár Aréna	2,931	12th
KTE-Duna Aszfalt	Kecskemét	Messzi István Sportcsarnok	1,851	7th
Egis Körmend	Körmend	Városi Sportcsarnok	2,002	3rd
OSE Lions	Oroszlány	Krajnyik András Sportcsarnok	1,400	9th
NKA Universitas Pécs	Pécs	Nemzeti Kosárlabda Akadémia	412	1st (NB I/B - Red)
Soproni KC	Sopron	Novomatic Aréna	1,250	8th
SZTE-Szedeák	Szeged	Városi Sportcsarnok	3,017	11th
Szolnoki Olajbányász	Szolnok	Tiszaligeti Sportcsarnok	2,122	5th
Zalakerámia ZTE	Zalaegerszeg	Városi Sportcsarnok	2,210	4th

=== Personnel and sponsorship ===
Hungarian national sports betting brand Tippmix sponsored all 14 teams of the first league since February 2019, their logo were present on all team kits.

Team	Head coach	Captain	Kit manufacturer	Main shirt sponsor
Alba Fehérvár	(Spain) Alejandro Zubillaga	(Hungary) Dávid Vojvoda	Mizuno	Endo Plus Service
Atomerőmű SE	(Slovenia) Sebastjan Krasovec		Adidas	Atomerőmű
Budapesti Honvéd	(Bosnia and Herzegovina) Zlatko Jovanović		Toti Sport	None
DEAC	(Serbia) Anđelko Mandić	(Hungary) Bálint Mócsán	Peak	None
Falco Szombathely	(Slovenia) Miloš Konakov	(Hungary) Zoltán Perl	DRK	Vulcano energia
Kaposvári KK	(Slovenia) Dalibor Damjanović	(Serbia) Boris Krnjajski	Toti Sport	Kometa
KTE-Duna Aszfalt	(Croatia) (Hungary) Stojan Ivković	(Hungary) Krisztián Wittmann	Ziccer	Duna Aszfalt
Egis Körmend	(Hungary) Tamás Kocsis	(Hungary) Csaba Ferencz	Nike	Egis
OSE Lions	(Hungary) Kornél Váradi	(Hungary) Máté Illés	DRK	MVM
NKA Universitas Pécs	(Hungary) Ferenc Csirke		Six	exim
Soproni KC	(Slovenia) Gašper Potočnik		DRK	None
SZTE-Szedeák	(Hungary) Árpád Simándi		Toti Sport	Szeged
Szolnoki Olajbányász	(Serbia) Oliver Vidin		Spalding	
Zalakerámia ZTE	(Germany) Matthias Zollner		Spalding	Zalakerámia

=== Managerial changes ===
Team	Outgoing manager	Manner of departure	Date of vacancy	Position in table	Incoming manager	Date of appointment
Sopron	(Greece) Kostas Flevarakis	Resigned	19 May 2023	Pre-season	(Hungary) Miklós Bors	20 June 2023
Zalakerámia ZTE	(Slovenia) Sebastjan Krasovec	End of contract	31 May 2023	Pre-season	(Czech Republic) Lubomír Růžička	8 June 2023
Budapesti Honvéd	(Hungary) Szabolcs Baksa		21 June 2023	Pre-season	(Bosnia and Herzegovina) Zlatko Jovanović	5 July 2023
Szolnoki Olajbányász	(Hungary) Gábor Szarvas	End of contract	28 June 2023	Pre-season	(Serbia) Miodrag Rajković	28 June 2023
Kaposvári KK	(Hungary) Balász Szőke (Hungary) Filipovics Gordan	End of contract	10 July 2023	Pre-season	(Hungary) Kornél Váradi	10 July 2023
Atomerőmű SE	(Hungary) Ferenc Csirke	Sacked	22 October 2023	14th	(Slovenia) Sebastjan Krasovec	23 October 2023
Soproni KC	(Hungary) Miklós Bors	Mutual consent	23 November 2023	9th	(Slovenia) Gašper Potočnik	26 November 2023
KTE-Duna Aszfalt	(Hungary) Gábor Forray	Mutual consent	4 December 2023	14th	(Croatia) (Hungary) Stojan Ivković	6 December 2023
Kaposvári KK	(Hungary) Kornél Váradi	Resigned	4 December 2023	10th	(Slovenia) Dalibor Damjanović	18 December 2023
Szolnoki Olajbányász	(Serbia) Miodrag Rajković	Mutual consent	11 December 2023	3rd	(Hungary) Gábor Szarvas^{i}	11 December 2023
OSE Lions	(Slovenia) Simon Petrov	Sacked	4 January 2024	13th	(Hungary) Kornél Váradi	5 January 2024
Zalakerámia ZTE	(Czech Republic) Lubomír Růžička	Mutual consent	25 January 2024	7th	(Germany) Matthias Zollner	29 January 2024
NKA Universitas Pécs	(Serbia) Goran Tadić	Resigned	29 January 2024	10th	(Hungary) Ferenc Csirke	29 January 2024
SZTE-Szedeák	(Serbia) Nikola Lazić	Resigned	16 February 2024	12th	(Hungary) Árpád Simándi	16 February 2024
Szolnoki Olajbányász	(Hungary) Gábor Szarvas	End of interim spell	18 February 2024	3rd	(Serbia) Oliver Vidin	18 February 2024

== Regular season ==
=== League table ===
Pos	Team	Pld	W	L	PF	PA	PD	Pts	Qualification
1	Falco-Vulcano Energia KC Szombathely	26	22	4	2443	1969	+474	48	Playoffs
2	Arconic-Alba Fehérvár	26	21	5	2444	2192	+252	47	Playoffs
3	NHSZ-Szolnoki Olajbányász	26	15	11	2122	2152	−30	41	Playoffs
4	Zalakerámia ZTE KK	26	13	13	2211	2224	−13	39	Playoffs
5	DEAC	26	13	13	1982	2034	−52	39	Playoffs
6	NKA Universitas Pécs	26	12	14	2153	2165	−12	38	Playoffs
7	Sopron KC	26	12	14	2070	2168	−98	38	Playoffs
8	Budapesti Honvéd SE	26	12	14	2058	2070	−12	38	Playoffs
9	MVM-OSE Lions	26	12	14	2207	2192	+15	38	Playout
10	Egis Körmend	26	11	15	2140	2231	−91	37	Playout
11	SZTE-Szedeák	26	11	15	2286	2358	−72	37	Playout
12	Atomerőmű SE	26	10	16	2076	2206	−130	36	Playout
13	Duna Aszfalt-DTKH Kecskemét	26	9	17	2084	2179	−95	35	Playout
14	Kometa Kaposvári KK	26	9	17	2143	2279	−136	35	Playout

Updated to match(es) played on unknown. Source: Hungarian Basketball Federation (in Hungarian), Flashscore
Rules for classification: 1) Games played; 2) Points; 3) Wins; 4) Defeats; 5) Points scored; 6) Points against; 7) Victories/Defeats series; 8) in Home games; 9) as a Guest; 10) Last 5 matches.

=== Results ===
In the table below the home teams are listed on the left and the away teams along the top.

Home \ Away	ALBA	ASE	BHSE	DEAC	FAL	KAP	KTE	KÖR	OSE	NKA	SOP	SZEG	SZOL	ZTE
Alba Fehérvár	—	105–76	72–62	101–81	93–80	105–77	84–70	92–67	90–80	101–90	100–73	94–92	93–73	103–76
Atomerőmű SE	80–87	—	63–78	61–70	82–118	73–82	90–78	62–80	95–82	81–79	86–76	87–78	92–86	90–88
Budapesti Honvéd	89–91	71–77	—	80–60	72–81	100–91	79–67	87–96	80–70	95–63	67–68	92–87	91–77	76–75
DEAC	93–92	87–85	73–75	—	85–81	77–61	79–71	75–70	59–80	85–78	86–73	75–80	80–88	51–66
Falco Szombathely	108–75	88–69	89–79	87–68	—	103–66	94–75	91–46	99–70	112–92	92–66	110–80	88–75	100–72
Kaposvári KK	92–89	83–68	75–69	92–85	76–93	—	86–97	101–81	84–102	94–80	86–88	90–105	90–96	89–78
KTE-Duna Aszfalt	99–104	92–75	67–75	84–90	96–103	104–89	—	81–78	73–85	71–70	83–80	95–98	74–83	93–81
Egis Körmend	103–98	92–100	87–76	70–81	65–101	80–71	94–70	—	79–117	88–72	93–56	90–73	85–90	84–85
OSE Lions	88–106	84–73	89–83	78–81	81–91	85–84	72–78	87–76	—	91–106	103–87	88–79	99–81	114–79
NKA Universitas Pécs	80–86	82–80	91–79	75–64	66–96	67–69	79–75	92–75	91–83	—	89–83	110–74	94–86	93–81
Soproni KC	95–101	89–85	87–67	69–64	74–89	83–78	68–61	98–79	79–57	78–75	—	96–102	73–80	71–76
SZTE-Szedeák	98–102	92–87	92–76	91–96	80–79	89–77	79–91	95–99	89–75	90–97	93–105	—	93–86	70–74
Szolnoki Olajbányász	81–97	73–67	91–65	73–66	69–85	94–82	70–59	79–73	76–70	68–64	80–84	94–90	—	90–83
Zalakerámia ZTE	89–83	86–92	91–95	73–71	97–85	88–78	94–80	101–110	94–77	80–78	96–71	93–97	115–83	—

Updated to match(es) played on unknown. Source: Hungarian Basketball Federation
Legend: Blue = home team win; Red = away team win.
Matches with lighter background shading were decided after overtime.

=== Results by round ===
Team ╲ Round	1	2	3	4	5	6	7	8	9	10	11	12	13	14	15	16	17	18	19	20	21	22	23	24	25	26
Alba Fehérvár	W	W	W	W	W	W	W	W	W	W	l	W	L	W	W	W	W	W	L	W	L	W	W	W	L	W
Atomerőmű SE	L	L	L	L	L	L	L	W	L	W	W	W	L	W	W	W	L	L	W	L	W	L	L	L	L	W
Budapesti Honvéd	L	L	W	L	W	L	L	L	L	L	L	W	W	L	L	L	W	W	W	L	W	w	W	L	W	W
DEAC	L	W	L	W	L	W	W	W	L	L	w	L	L	W	W	L	W	W	L	W	L	w	L	L	L	W
Falco Szombathely	W	W	W	L	W	W	W	W	W	W	W	W	W	W	W	W	W	W	W	W	W	l	W	L	W	L
Kaposvári KK	L	W	L	W	l	L	W	L	W	L	L	L	L	W	W	L	W	L	W	L	W	l	L	L	L	L
KTE-Duna Aszfalt	W	L	L	L	L	L	W	L	L	L	W	W	W	L	L	W	L	L	W	L	L	L	W	L	W	L
Egis Körmend	W	W	W	L	L	L	W	W	L	W	L	L	W	L	L	L	L	W	W	W	W	L	L	L	L	L
OSE Lions	W	W	L	W	L	L	L	L	W	L	W	L	L	L	L	L	L	W	L	W	W	W	L	W	W	W
NKA Universitas Pécs	L	L	W	L	W	L	L	W	W	W	L	W	L	L	L	L	W	L	W	L	L	W	W	W	L	W
Soproni KC	L	L	L	W	w	W	L	L	L	L	W	W	W	W	W	W	L	W	L	L	W	L	L	W	L	L
SZTE-Szedeák	w	L	L	W	W	W	W	L	L	W	L	L	W	L	L	W	L	L	L	L	L	L	W	W	W	L
Szolnoki Olajbányász	W	W	W	L	L	W	L	W	W	L	W	L	W	L	L	W	W	L	L	W	L	W	L	W	W	W
Zalakerámia ZTE	l	L	W	W	W	W	L	L	W	W	L	L	L	W	W	L	L	L	L	W	L	W	W	W	W	L

Source: Hungarian Basketball Federation, nso.hu (in Hungarian)
W = Win; L = Loss; l = Overtime loss; w = Overtime win

== Playoffs ==
All three rounds of the playoffs (exception the Third place game) were played in a best-of-five format, with the higher seeded team playing the first, third and fifth game at home (if it was necessary).

=== Bracket ===
Quarter-finals
1	Falco-Vulcano Energia KC Szombathely	3
8	Budapesti Honvéd SE	0
4	Zalakerámia ZTE KK	3
5	DEAC	2
2	Arconic-Alba Fehérvár	3
7	Sopron KC	0
3	NHSZ-Szolnoki Olajbányász	3
6	NKA Universitas Pécs	0

Semi-finals
1	Falco-Vulcano Energia KC Szombathely	3
4	Zalakerámia ZTE KK	0
2	Arconic-Alba Fehérvár	1
3	NHSZ-Szolnoki Olajbányász	3

Finals
1	Falco-Vulcano Energia KC Szombathely	3
3	NHSZ-Szolnoki Olajbányász	1
Third place
2	Arconic-Alba Fehérvár	3
4	Zalakerámia ZTE KK	0

=== Quarter-finals ===
Team 1	Series	Team 2	Game 1	Game 2	Game 3	Game 4	Game 5
Falco-Vulcano Energia KC Szombathely	3–0	Budapesti Honvéd SE	102–60	89–52	94–60	—	—
Arconic-Alba Fehérvár	3–0	Sopron KC	105–86	97–78	99–82	—	—
NHSZ-Szolnoki Olajbányász	3–0	NKA Universitas Pécs	99–79	83–82	99–80	—	—
Zalakerámia ZTE KK	3–2	DEAC	87–73	93–98 (OT)	82–66	79–83 (OT)	75–74

=== Semi-finals ===
Team 1	Series	Team 2	Game 1	Game 2	Game 3	Game 4	Game 5
Falco-Vulcano Energia KC Szombathely	3–0	Zalakerámia ZTE KK	101–63	96–71	103–59	—	—
Arconic-Alba Fehérvár	1–3	NHSZ-Szolnoki Olajbányász	92–83	80–93	109–110	86–99	—

=== Third place ===
Team 1	Series	Team 2	Game 1	Game 2	Game 3	Game 4	Game 5
Arconic-Alba Fehérvár	3–0	Zalakerámia ZTE KK	104–77	83–67	109–78	—	—

=== Finals ===
Team 1	Series	Team 2	Game 1	Game 2	Game 3	Game 4	Game 5
Falco-Vulcano Energia KC Szombathely	3–1	NHSZ-Szolnoki Olajbányász	83–59	87–100	100–76	89–77	—

==== Game 1 ====
11 May 2024	Falco-Vulcano Energia KC Szombathely	83–59 (Series: 1–0)	NHSZ-Szolnoki Olajbányász	Szombathely
19:45 (CEST)	Scoring by quarter: 30–15, 19–12, 15–23, 19–9
	Pts: Perl 19	Report	Pts: Eads III 14	Arena: Arena Savaria; Referees: Tamás Benczur, Gellért Kapitány, Gábor Farkas

==== Game 2 ====
14 May 2024	NHSZ-Szolnoki Olajbányász	100–87 (Series: 1–1)	Falco-Vulcano Energia KC Szombathely	Szolnok
18:00 (CEST)	Scoring by quarter: 16–21, 21–19, 33–29, 30–18
	Pts: Jovanović 22	Report	Pts: Perl 25	Arena: Városi Sportcsarnok; Referees: Tamás Földházi, Csaba Cziffra, Balázs Mészáros dr.

==== Game 3 ====
17 May 2024	Falco-Vulcano Energia KC Szombathely	100–76 (Series: 2–1)	NHSZ-Szolnoki Olajbányász	Szombathely
18:15 (CEST)	Scoring by quarter: 26–21, 23–20, 24–18, 27–17
	Pts: Keller, Perl 18	Report	Pts: Jovanović 24	Arena: Arena Savaria; Referees: Péter Praksch, Cecília Montgomery-Tóth, Viktor Nagy

==== Game 4 ====
20 May 2024	NHSZ-Szolnoki Olajbányász	77–89 (Series: 1–3)	Falco-Vulcano Energia KC Szombathely	Szolnok
18:00 (CEST)	Scoring by quarter: 18–18, 16–25, 12–21, 31–25
	Pts: Jovanović, Wiggins 15	Report	Pts: Perl 30	Arena: Városi Sportcsarnok; Referees: Tamás Benczur, Gellért Kapitány, Márton Makrai

== 5-8th place ==
All two rounds of the playoff for the 5th place were played in a best-of-three format, with the higher seeded team playing the first and third game at home (if it was necessary).

=== Bracket ===
Semi-finals
6	NKA Universitas Pécs	2
7	Sopron KC	0
5	DEAC	0
8	Budapesti Honvéd SE	2

5th place
6	NKA Universitas Pécs	1
8	Budapesti Honvéd SE	2
7th place
5	DEAC	0
7	Sopron KC	2

=== Semi-finals ===
Team 1	Series	Team 2	Game 1	Game 2	Game 3
NKA Universitas Pécs	2–0	Sopron KC	87–59	83–59	—
DEAC	0–2	Budapesti Honvéd SE	62–86	58–78	—

=== 7th place ===
Team 1	Series	Team 2	Game 1	Game 2	Game 3
DEAC	0–2	Sopron KC	68–80	87–89	—

=== 5th place ===
Team 1	Series	Team 2	Game 1	Game 2	Game 3
NKA Universitas Pécs	1–2	Budapesti Honvéd SE	81–76	77–78	63–84

== Playout ==
=== League table ===
Pos	Team	Pld	W	L	PF	PA	PD	Pts	Qualification
1	MVM-OSE Lions (Note: +6 adjust points (based on regular season standings))	10	5	5	931	913	+18	21	
2	Atomerőmű SE (Note: +3 adjust points (based on regular season standings))	10	6	4	906	883	+23	19	
3	SZTE-Szedeák (Note: +4 adjust points (based on regular season standings))	10	5	5	933	930	+3	19	
4	Egis Körmend (Note: +5 adjust points (based on regular season standings))	10	4	6	856	914	−58	19	
5	Duna Aszfalt-DTKH Kecskemét (Note: +2 adjust points (based on regular season standings))	10	6	4	849	824	+25	18	
6	Kometa Kaposvári KK (Note: +1 adjust points (based on regular season standings))	10	4	6	863	874	−11	15	▼ Relegation to Nemzeti Bajnokság I/B

Updated to match(es) played on 18 May 2024. Source: Hungarian Basketball Federation (in Hungarian), Flashscore
Rules for classification: 1) Games played; 2) Points; 3) Wins; 4) Defeats; 5) Points scored; 6) Points against; 7) Victories/Defeats series; 8) in Home games; 9) as a Guest; 10) Last 5 matches.

== Statistics ==
=== Number of teams by counties and regions ===
Number of teams by counties
Pos.	County (megye)	No. of teams	Teams
1	Vas	2	Falco Szombathely and Egis Körmend
2	Baranya	1	NKA Universitas Pécs
2	Bács-Kiskun	1	KTE-Duna Aszfalt
2	Budapest	1	Budapesti Honvéd
2	Csongrád-Csanád	1	SZTE-Szedeák
2	Fejér	1	Alba Fehérvár
2	Győr-Moson-Sopron	1	Soproni KC
2	Hajdú-Bihar	1	DEAC
2	Jász-Nagykun-Szolnok	1	Szolnoki Olajbányász
2	Komárom-Esztergom	1	OSE Lions
2	Somogy	1	Kaposvári KK
2	Tolna	1	Atomerőmű SE
2	Zala	1	Zalakerámai ZTE

Number of teams by regions
Transdanubia	Central Hungary	Great Plain and North
Alba Fehérvár; Atomerőmű SE; Falco Szombathely; Kaposvári KK; Egis Körmend; NKA Universitas Pécs; OSE Lions; Soproni KC; Zalakerámia ZTE	Budapesti Honvéd	DEAC; KTE-Duna Aszfalt; SZTE-Szedeák; Szolnoki Olajbányász
9 Teams	1 Team	4 Teams

== Nemzeti Bajnokság I/A clubs in European competitions ==
FIBA competitions
Team	Competition	Progress	W–L
Falco Szombathely	Champions League	Regular Season	2–4
Arconic-Alba Fehérvár	FIBA Europe Cup	Regular Season	1–3
Egis Körmend	FIBA Europe Cup	Qualifying tournaments	1–1

== See also ==
- 2024 Magyar Kupa
- 2023–24 DEAC season
