= Karolis Giedraitis =

Lithuanian basketball player

No. 4 – BC Gargždai
- Position: Point guard / shooting guard
- League: LKL

Personal information
- Born: 24 March 1998 (age 28) Vilnius, Lithuania
- Listed height: 1.94 m (6 ft 4 in)
- Listed weight: 85 kg (187 lb)

Career information
- NBA draft: 2020: undrafted
- Playing career: 2015–present

Career history
- 2015–2021: Lietuvos rytas / Rytas Vilnius
- 2015–2016: → Lietuvos Rytas-2
- 2016–2019: → BC Perlas
- 2019: → BC Lietkabelis
- 2020–2021: → Pieno žvaigždės
- 2021–2022: Lietkabelis Panevėžys
- 2022–2023: Labas Gas Prienai
- 2023–2024: Šiauliai
- 2024: CB Morón
- 2025: Tartu Ülikool
- 2025–present: BC Gargždai

Karolis Giedraitis (born 24 March 1998 in Vilnius, Lithuania) is a Lithuanian professional basketball player for BC Gargždai of the Lithuanian Basketball League (LKL).

== Career ==
Giedraitis started his career with Lietuvos Rytas-2, the development team of Lietuvos rytas during the 2015–16 season, playing in Lithuanian third-tier RKL. Next season, he moved to BC Perlas of the NKL. He spent one and half season with team, and in 2019 January signed a new contract with Rytas. Soon after signing new contract, he was loaned to BC Lietkabelis.

On 5 July 2023, Giedraitis signed a three-year (2+1) contract with BC Šiauliai of the Lithuanian Basketball League (LKL).

On 24 August 2025, Giedraitis signed with BC Gargždai of the Lithuanian Basketball League (LKL).

== Personal life ==
Giedraitis is the son of former professional basketball player and coach Andrius Giedraitis. His younger brother, Dovydas, is also a professional basketball player.
