= BC Gargždai (2024) =

Basketball team in Gargždai, Lithuania

- Leagues: Lithuanian Basketball League
- Founded: 2024; 2 years ago
- History: List: Gargždai (2024–present)
- Arena: Gargždai Arena
- Capacity: 1,500
- Location: Gargždai , Lithuania
- Team colors: Green, white, red
- Main sponsor: 7bet
- President: Arminas Linkauskas
- General manager: Donatas Maselskis
- Head coach: Paulius Malašauskas
- Championships: 1 RKL B Division
- Website: gargzdaibasketball.lt
Home

Gargždai Basketball (Lithuanian: Krepšinio klubas Gargždai), also known as BC Gargždai or simply Gargždai, is a Lithuanian professional basketball club based in Gargždai. The team competes in the Lithuanian Basketball League (LKL).

== History ==
The club was founded in 2024, following the mid-season bankruptcy and dissolution of BC Gargždai-SC earlier that same year. The new team entered the B Division of the third-tier Regional Basketball League (RKL) during the 2024–25 season. In its inaugural season, Gargždai won the RKL B Division championship and earned the right to promote to the NKL.

On 10 July 2025, the Lithuanian Basketball League (LKL) board granted the club a license to participate in the 2025–26 LKL season. To secure its financial stability, the club signed a sponsorship agreement with 7bet during the preseason. On 21 September 2025, the club made its debut in the LKL in a 85–93 home loss against Šiauliai. Despite the opening loss, the team recorded a highly successful first season in the LKL, finishing 6th in the regular season standings and qualifying for the playoffs, before eventually being eliminated by BC Neptūnas in the quarterfinals. The team was led by guards Jalon Pipkins and Justin Turner, forward Nojus Mineikis and center Paulius Petrilevičius.

== Players ==
=== Current roster ===
BC Gargždai roster
Players
Coaches

Pos.	No.	Nat.	Name	Ht.	Wt.	Age
F	0	(Lithuania)	Mikalauskas, Arūnas	2.04 m (6 ft 8 in)	92 kg (203 lb)	29 – 14 September 1997
PG	1	(United States)	Carlos, Jaquan	1.83 m (6 ft 0 in)	72 kg (159 lb)	24 – 9 August 2002
G	2	(Lithuania)	Gervinas, Matas	1.87 m (6 ft 2 in)	75 kg (165 lb)	17 – 10 March 2009
G	4	(Lithuania)	Giedraitis, Karolis (injured)	1.94 m (6 ft 4 in)	85 kg (187 lb)	28 – 24 March 1998
G/F	5	(Lithuania)	Šaulys, Evaldas (C)	1.91 m (6 ft 3 in)	87 kg (192 lb)	33 – 4 March 1993
G	8	(Lithuania)	Gervinas, Ugnius	1.86 m (6 ft 1 in)	74 kg (163 lb)	17 – 10 March 2009
C	10	(Canada)	Shepard, Grant	2.08 m (6 ft 10 in)	95 kg (209 lb)	27 – 7 April 1999
F/C	13	(United States)	Wilson, Langston	2.06 m (6 ft 9 in)	98 kg (216 lb)	26 – 11 April 2000
C	18	(Lithuania)	Kulikauskas, Paulius	2.07 m (6 ft 9 in)	111 kg (245 lb)	20 – 28 July 2006
F	22	(Lithuania)	Vaištaras, Laurynas	1.98 m (6 ft 6 in)	90 kg (198 lb)	25 – 17 January 2001
PF	23	(Canada)	Krikke, Benjamin	2.06 m (6 ft 9 in)	111 kg (245 lb)	25 – 23 March 2001
PG	24	(Lithuania)	Sidarevičius, Adomas	1.90 m (6 ft 3 in)	90 kg (198 lb)	25 – 24 June 2001
SG	32	(Lithuania)	Kreišmontas, Rokas	1.95 m (6 ft 5 in)	91 kg (201 lb)	20 – 23 January 2006
G/F	98	(United States) (Syria)	Davis Jr., Stanley	1.96 m (6 ft 5 in)	93 kg (205 lb)	28 – 13 September 1998

Head coach

- (Lithuania) Paulius Malašauskas

Assistant coach(es)

- (Lithuania) Vidas Ginevičius
- (Lithuania) Lukas Aleksandravičius

Athletic trainer(s)

- (Lithuania) Robertinas Vilimas

Legend

- (C) Team captain
- Injured

- Roster
Updated: September 17, 2026

=== Depth chart ===
Pos.	Starting 5	Bench 1	Bench 2	Inactive
C	Langston Wilson	Grant Shepard	Paulius Kulikauskas
PF	Arūnas Mikalauskas	Benjamin Krikke
SF	Stanley Davis Jr.	Laurynas Vaištaras
SG	Evaldas Šaulys	Rokas Kreišmontas	Ugnius Gervinas	Karolis Giedraitis (injured)
PG	Jaquan Carlos	Adomas Sidarevičius	Matas Gervinas

=== In ===
No.	Pos.	Nat.	Name	Moving from	
—	HC	(Lithuania)	Paulius Malašauskas	Lietkabelis Panevėžys	(Lithuania)
0	F	(Lithuania)	Arūnas Mikalauskas	Heroes Den Bosch	(Netherlands)
1	PG	(United States)	Jaquan Carlos	ŁKS Coolpack Łódź	(Poland)
5	G/F	(Lithuania)	Evaldas Šaulys	Juventus Utena	(Lithuania)
10	C	(Canada)	Grant Shepard	Vancouver Bandits	(Canada)
13	F/C	(United States)	Langston Wilson	Pelister Bitola	(North Macedonia)
18	C	(Lithuania)	Paulius Kulikauskas	Rytas-2 Vilnius	(Lithuania)
23	F/C	(Canada)	Benjamin Krikke	Jonava Hipocredit	(Lithuania)
24	PG	(Lithuania)	Adomas Sidarevičius	Jonava Hipocredit	(Lithuania)
32	SG	(Lithuania)	Rokas Kreišmontas	Olimpas Plungė	(Lithuania)
98	G/F	(United States) (Syria)	Stanley Davis Jr.	TFT	(North Macedonia)

=== Out ===
No.	Pos.	Nat.	Name	Moving to	
—	HC	(Lithuania)	Tomas Rinkevičius	BC Tauragė	(Lithuania)
0	F/C	(United States)	Ethan Chargois	BK Opava	(Czech Republic)
1	G	(United States)	Trey Pulliam	Free agent	
3	G/F	(France)	Daryl Doualla	BC Tauragė	(Lithuania)
5	G	(United States)	Jalon Pipkins	Spartak Subotica	(Serbia)
7	G/F	(Lithuania)	Nojus Mineikis	BC Tauragė	(Lithuania)
11	G	(United States)	Justin Turner	Karditsa	(Greece)
13	F	(Lithuania)	Deividas Gailius	Retired	
14	F/C	(Lithuania)	Paulius Petrilevičius	Nevėžis Kėdainiai	(Lithuania)
33	F/C	(Latvia)	Mārtiņš Meiers	Ungmennafélagið Sindri	(Iceland)

== Season by season ==
Season	Tier	League	Pos.	King Mindaugas Cup
2024–25	4	RKL B Division	1st	
2025–26	1	LKL	7th	Group stage

== Head coaches ==
- (Lithuania) Povilas Šakinis: 2024–2025
- (Lithuania) Tomas Rinkevičius: 2025–2026
- (Lithuania) Paulius Malašauskas: 2026–present
