= Rakeem Buckles =

Professional basketball player

No. 5 – Hapoel Haifa
- Position: Forward
- League: Israeli Basketball Premier League

Personal information
- Born: November 15, 1990 (age 36) Miami, Florida
- Listed height: 6 ft 7 in (2.01 m)
- Listed weight: 216 lb (98 kg)

Career information
- High school: Monsignor Edward Pace High School
- College: University of Louisville; Florida International University

Career history
- 2020–present: Hapoel Haifa

Rakeem Buckles (born November 15, 1990) is a professional basketball player, and plays the forward position. He plays for Hapoel Haifa in the Israeli Basketball Premier League.

== Personal life ==
Buckles was born in Miami, Florida. His parents are Ronald and Sabrina Buckles. He is 6 ft 7 in (201 cm) tall, and weighs 216 pounds (98 kg).

== Basketball career ==
Buckles attended and played basketball for Monsignor Edward Pace High School. As a senior, he was named the Florida Class 4A Player of the Year after he averaged 22.8 points, 13.1 rebounds, and 3.5 blocked shots per game.

He played basketball at the University of Louisville in 2009–12. Between 2011 and 2012 Buckles suffered two torn anterior cruciate ligaments in under 12 months. He then played basketball at Florida International University, for whom in 2013–14 in Conference USA he was third in rebounds per game with 8.6, fifth in rebounds with 266, and eighth in blocks per game with 1.4.

Buckles plays for Hapoel Haifa in the Israeli Basketball Premier League.
