= Justin Turner (basketball) =

American basketball player (born 1998)

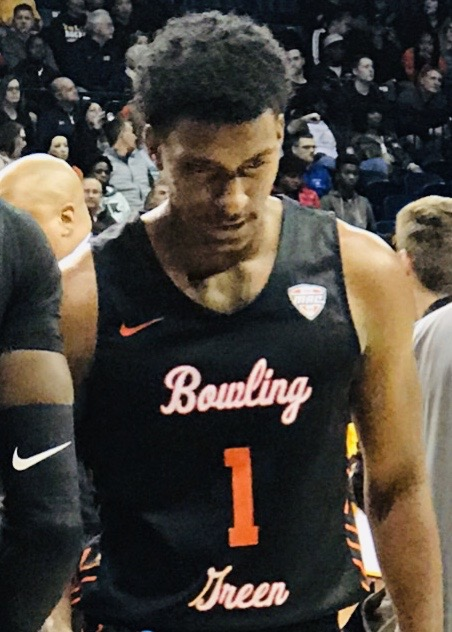

No. 1 – ASK Karditsas
- Position: Shooting guard / point guard
- League: GBL

Personal information
- Born: March 12, 1998 (age 28) Detroit, Michigan, U.S.
- Listed height: 6 ft 4 in (1.93 m)
- Listed weight: 205 lb (93 kg)

Career information
- High school: Renaissance (Detroit, Michigan)
- College: Bowling Green (2016–2021)
- NBA draft: 2021: undrafted
- Playing career: 2021–present

Career history
- 2021–2022: Motor City Cruise
- 2023: Grand Rapids Gold
- 2023–2024: Río Ourense Termal
- 2024–2025: Anwil Włocławek
- 2025: SC Derby
- 2025–2026: BC Gargždai
- 2026–present: Karditsa

Career highlights
- 3x First-team All-MAC (2019-2021); MAC All-Freshman Team (2018)

Justin Rafael Turner (born March 12, 1998), nicknamed "Juice" or "JT", is an American professional basketball player for Karditsa of the Greek Basketball League (GBL). He played college basketball for the Bowling Green Falcons.

== Early life ==
Turner was born and grew up in Detroit, Michigan, and attended Renaissance High School. As a senior, he averaged 21 points, seven rebounds, and five assists per game and was named first team All-City and second team All-State. He committed to the Bowling Green Falcons over several other Mid-American Conference schools.

== College career ==
Turner played in four games as a true freshman before using a medical redshirt due to a season-ending injury. He was named to the Mid-American Conference (MAC) All-Freshman team and honorable mention all-conference after averaging 15.9 points per game as a redshirt freshman. Turner averaged 18.2 points, 3.7 rebounds, 3.1 assists and 1.4 steals per game and was named first team All-MAC the following season. Turner scored his 1,000th career point on a late layup to help the Falcons to a 73–69 win over Akron on February 19, 2019, part of a 23-point performance. He initially declared for the 2019 NBA draft but withdrew after working out for several teams, returning to Bowling Green for his redshirt junior season. Turner was named first team All-MAC for a second straight season after averaging 18.8 points, 4.6 rebounds and 2.5 assists per game. After the season Turner entered the transfer portal and was widely considered to be one of the best graduate transfer players available. Turner ultimately decided to return to Bowling Green for his redshirt senior season.

On February 16, 2021, Turner became the first player in school history to surpass the 2,000 career point mark. He averaged 19.3 points and 4.4 assist per game as a redshirt senior.

== Professional career ==
=== Motor City Cruise (2021–2022) ===
After going undrafted in the 2021 NBA draft, Turner played for the San Antonio Spurs in the 2021 NBA Summer League. Turner made his debut in an 87–58 loss against the Utah Jazz's "White" Team on August 3. He led the team with 13 points and seven rebounds along with one assist, steal, and block.

On October 23, 2021, the Westchester Knicks selected Turner with their fourth overall pick in the 2021 NBA G League draft. On October 25, 2021, Turner was included in training camp roster of the Westchester Knicks, but was waived before the season began. On November 15, he signed with the Motor City Cruise.

=== Grand Rapids Gold (2023) ===
On March 2, 2023, Turner was acquired by the Grand Rapids Gold.

=== Río Ourense Termal (2023–2024) ===
On July 5, 2023, Turner signed with Río Ourense Termal of the LEB Oro.

=== Anwil Włocławek (2024–2025) ===
On July 7, 2024, he signed with Anwil Włocławek of the Polish Basketball League (PLK).

=== Gargždai (2025–2026) ===
On December 22, 2025, Turner signed with BC Gargždai of the Lithuanian Basketball League (LKL).

=== Karditsa (2026–present) ===
On July 1, 2026, Turner signed with Karditsa of the Greek Basketball League (GBL).

== Career statistics ==
Legend
GP	Games played	GS	Games started	MPG	Minutes per game
FG%	Field goal percentage	3P%	3-point field goal percentage	FT%	Free throw percentage
RPG	Rebounds per game	APG	Assists per game	SPG	Steals per game
BPG	Blocks per game	PPG	Points per game	**Bold**	Career high

=== College ===
Year	Team	GP	GS	MPG	FG%	3P%	FT%	RPG	APG	SPG	BPG	PPG
2016–17	Bowling Green	4	0	13.3	.417	**.500**	.750	1.0	0.3	0.3	.0	3.8
2017–18	Bowling Green	31	31	33.9	.406	.379	.813	3.6	2.6	**1.5**	**.3**	15.9
2018–19	Bowling Green	**34**	**34**	32.2	**.468**	.372	.709	3.7	3.1	1.4	.2	18.2
2019–20	Bowling Green	25	25	32.3	.427	.361	.851	**4.6**	2.5	0.8	.2	18.8
2020–21	Bowling Green	25	25	**34.7**	.411	.296	**.878**	4.3	**4.4**	**1.5**	.2	**19.3**
Career		119	115	32.6	.430	.357	.811	3.9	3.0	1.3	.2	17.5
