= Isaiah Philmore =

American-born German basketball player

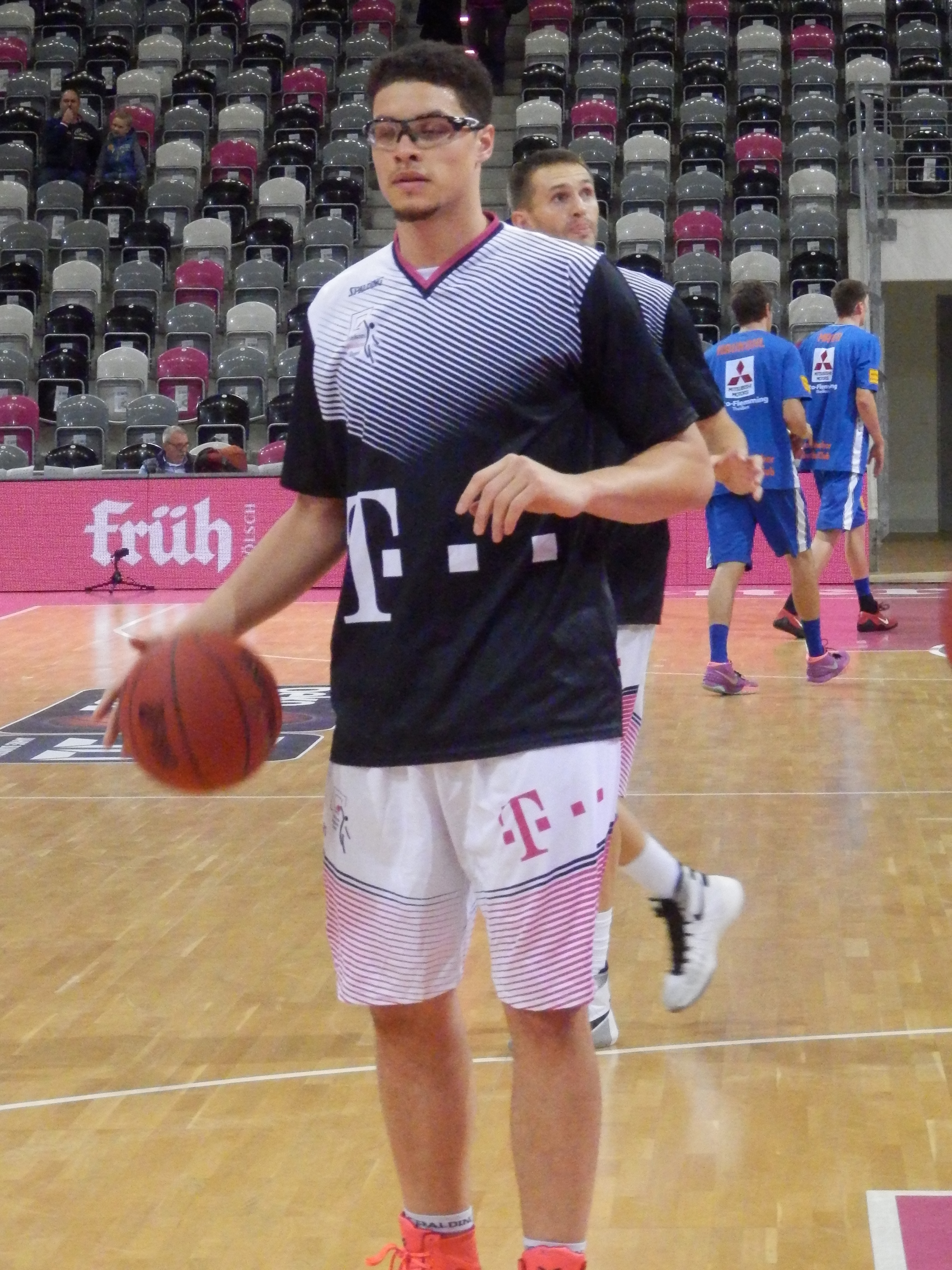
- Philmore with Telekom Baskets Bonn in 2015

No. 31 – Alba Fehérvár
- Position: Power forward
- League: Nemzeti Bajnokság I/A

Personal information
- Born: September 20, 1989 (age 37) El Paso, Texas, U.S.
- Listed height: 6 ft 8 in (2.03 m)
- Listed weight: 230 lb (104 kg)

Career information
- High school: The John Carroll School (Bel Air, Maryland)
- College: Towson (2009–2011); Xavier (2012–2014)
- NBA draft: 2014: undrafted
- Playing career: 2014–present

Career history
- 2014–2015: ratiopharm Ulm
- 2015–2016: Telekom Baskets Bonn
- 2016–2017: Tigers Tübingen
- 2017–2018: EWE Baskets Oldenburg
- 2018–2021: CSU Sibiu
- 2021: Telekom Baskets
- 2021–2022: Rouen Métropole
- 2022–present: Alba Fehérvár

Isaiah Philmore (born 20 September 1989) is an American-born German professional basketball player for Alba Fehérvár of the Nemzeti Bajnokság I/A (NB1) in Hungary. Philmore was born in the United States but grew up in Bad Vilbel, Germany.
