= Ryan Woolridge =

American basketball player

No. 3 – Windy City Bulls
- Position: Point guard / shooting guard
- League: NBA G League

Personal information
- Born: November 16, 1996 (age 29)
- Listed height: 6 ft 3 in (1.91 m)
- Listed weight: 180 lb (82 kg)

Career information
- High school: Lake Ridge (Mansfield, Texas)
- College: North Texas (2016–2019); Gonzaga (2019–2020)
- NBA draft: 2020: undrafted
- Playing career: 2020–present

Career history
- 2020: Medi Bayreuth
- 2021: Oklahoma City Blue
- 2021–2022: Iraklis Thessaloniki
- 2022–2023: Oklahoma City Blue
- 2023–2024: Szedeák
- 2024–2025: Panionios
- 2025–present: Windy City Bulls

Career highlights
- CBI champion (2018); Third-team All-Conference USA (2019)

Ryan Woolridge (born November 16, 1996) is an American professional basketball player for the Windy City Bulls of the NBA G League. He played college basketball for the North Texas Mean Green and the Gonzaga Bulldogs.

== Early life ==
In fifth or sixth grade, Wooldridge played on the same Amateur Athletic Union (AAU) team as future Gonzaga teammate Admon Gilder. Woolridge attended Lake Ridge High School in Mansfield, Texas. While in high school, his mother was diagnosed with breast cancer. He did not play on a prominent AAU team as he had some bad experiences with the program. Woolridge received recruiting interest from several Big 12 programs and intended to sign with Texas before a coaching change. Instead, Woolridge signed with San Diego.

== College career ==
=== North Texas ===
Despite signing with San Diego out of high school, Woolridge never played a game for the team. Shortly after the start of his freshman season, his father, Columbus, was diagnosed with prostate cancer and he opted to transfer closer to home, to North Texas. After gaining eligibility in December 2016, Woolridge became an important piece for the Mean Green. As a freshman, he averaged 9.6 points, 4.9 rebounds and 3.2 assists per game and led the team with 41 steals. He averaged 12.7 points, 5.8 assists, 5.2 rebounds, and 1.3 steals per game as a sophomore, shooting 49.6 percent from the floor. On December 5, 2018, Woolridge posted a triple-double of 12 points, 10 rebounds and 10 assists as North Texas defeated Indiana State, 80–69. As a junior, Woolridge averaged 11.7 points, 6.0 rebounds, and 5.0 assists per game, earning Third Team All-Conference USA honors. During his junior season, Woolridge played with pain in both knees culminating in a stress fracture in his patella during the Conference USA tournament which required two screws in his leg.

=== Gonzaga ===
For his senior season, Woolridge decided to transfer to Gonzaga as a graduate transfer, choosing the Bulldogs over Oklahoma, Minnesota, Arkansas, and Arizona. He won praise for his defensive acumen at Gonzaga, holding Nico Mannion of Arizona to seven points. Woolridge averaged 10.1 points, 4.6 rebounds and 4.5 assists per game as a senior.

== Professional career ==
After going undrafted in the 2020 NBA draft, Woolridge signed with Medi Bayreuth of the Basketball Bundesliga on July 12, 2020. Woolridge left the team on December 29, 2020, after averaging 7.7 points and 3.1 assists in seven games. He then landed with the Oklahoma City Blue of the NBA G League, making his debut for the team on February 11, 2021. In 14 games, he averaged 6.6 points, 4.1 rebounds, 4.0 assists and 1.3 steals per game.

On July 24, 2021, Woolridge signed with Iraklis Thessaloniki of the Greek Basket League. On November 10, 2022, he re-signed with the Oklahoma City Blue.

On September 10, 2023, Woolridge signed with Naturtex-SZTE Szedeák of the Hungarian league.

== Career statistics ==
Legend
GP	Games played	GS	Games started	MPG	Minutes per game
FG%	Field goal percentage	3P%	3-point field goal percentage	FT%	Free throw percentage
RPG	Rebounds per game	APG	Assists per game	SPG	Steals per game
BPG	Blocks per game	PPG	Points per game	**Bold**	Career high

=== College ===
Year	Team	GP	GS	MPG	FG%	3P%	FT%	RPG	APG	SPG	BPG	PPG
2016–17	North Texas	21	12	28.5	.503	.357	.575	4.9	3.2	**2.0**	.1	9.6
2017–18	North Texas	**38**	**37**	**36.6**	.496	.315	.506	5.2	**5.8**	1.4	**.4**	**12.7**
2018–19	North Texas	30	27	32.8	.469	.333	.581	**5.9**	4.8	1.9	.3	11.7
2019–20	Gonzaga	33	33	32.7	**.529**	**.432**	**.610**	4.5	4.2	1.4	.2	10.1
Career		122	109	33.2	.497	.366	.555	5.1	4.7	1.6	.3	11.2
