= Jalen Henry =

American basketball player (born 1996)

Helsinki Seagulls
- Position: Power forward
- League: Korisliiga

Personal information
- Born: January 8, 1996 (age 30) Springfield, Illinois, U.S.
- Listed height: 2.03 m (6 ft 8 in)
- Listed weight: 100 kg (220 lb)

Career information
- High school: Springfield Southeast (Springfield, Illinois)
- College: SIU Edwardsville (2014–2018)
- NBA draft: 2018: undrafted
- Playing career: 2018–present

Career history
- 2018–2019: Charleville-Mézières
- 2019: Korihait
- 2020: BC Nokia
- 2020–2021: Sporting CP
- 2021: BK Olomoucko
- 2021: Korihait
- 2021–2022: BC Körmend
- 2022–2023: APOEL B.C.
- 2023: Vevey Riviera Basket
- 2023–2024: Budapesti Honvéd
- 2024–2025: Tartu Ülikool
- 2025–2026: Jonava Hipocredit
- 2026–present: Helsinki Seagulls

Career highlights
- Cypriot League All-Star (2022); Second-team All-OVC (2018)

Jalen Henry (born January 8, 1996) is an American professional basketball player for Helsinki Seagulls of the Korisliiga. He mainly plays the power forward and center positions.

== Professional career ==
Henry made his Europe debut in 2018, signing with Étoile Charleville-Mézières of the Nationale Masculine 1.

On January 21, 2020, Henry joined BC Nokia of the Korisliiga.

On July 29, 2020, he signed with Sporting CP of the Liga Portuguesa de Basquetebol (LPB).

In January 2021, Henry left Sporting CP and joined BK Olomoucko of the National Basketball League (Czech Republic).

He returned to Korihait of the Korisliiga, signing a one-year contract on July 7, 2021.

On November 14, 2021, he exercised the buyout clause in his contract to leave Korihait and join BC Körmend of the Nemzeti Bajnokság I/A (NB I/A).

In August 2022 Henry signed with APOEL B.C. of the Cyprus Basketball Division A, the top-tier of men's professional basketball in Cyprus.

On March 28, 2023, he signed with Vevey Riviera Basket of the Swiss Basketball League (SBL).

On July 16, 2023, Henry came back to Hungary, joining Budapesti Honvéd of the Nemzeti Bajnokság I/A (NB I/A).

On July 31, 2024, he joined Tartu Ülikool of the Latvian–Estonian Basketball League and the ENBL.

On August 24, 2025, Henry signed with Jonava Hipocredit of the Lithuanian Basketball League (LKL).

On January 6, 2026, Henry signed with Helsinki Seagulls of the Korisliiga.
