= 2024–25 Debreceni EAC (basketball) season =

Hungarian basketball season

Debreceni EAC
2024–25 season
- President: István Becsky
- Head coach: (Hungary) Ákos Pethő (from 18 March 2025)
- Arena: Oláh Gábor Sports Hall
- Nemzeti Bajnokság I/A, Regular season: 4th
- Nemzeti Bajnokság I/A, Play-off: 5th
- Hungarian Cup: 4th
- Biggest win: 22 points, NB I/A, R13, 89–67 v Oroszlány (H), NB I/A, R25, 73–51 v Szeged (H)
- Biggest defeat: 38 points, NB I/A, R7, 47–85 v Falco (A)
Home	Away
- All statistics correct as of 7 May 2025.

The 2024–25 season is Debreceni EAC's the 13th in existence and the club's 8th consecutive season in the top tier of Hungarian basketball.

== History ==
The basketball section of Debreceni EAC was founded in 2012. The club plays its home games at the Oláh Gábor Sports Hall, which has a capacity of 1,000 people. They entered the top division Nemzeti Bajnokság I/A for the 2017–18 season. In DEAC's debut season, the team finished in 11th place.

In the 2018–19 season, DEAC reached the semi-finals of the Hungarian Cup for the first time in history.

== Players ==
=== Current roster ===
Note: Flags indicate national team eligibility at FIBA-sanctioned events. Players may hold other non-FIBA nationalities not displayed.

Debreceni EAC roster
Players
Coaches

Pos.	No.	Nat.	Name	Ht.	Age
SG	2	(Hungary)	Fekete-Gál, Csongor	1.93 m (6 ft 4 in)	18 – 1 January 2007
PG	5	(United States)	Anderson, Kyan	1.80 m (5 ft 11 in)	33 – 25 March 1992
SG	7	(Hungary)	Neuwirth, Bence	1.92 m (6 ft 4 in)	23 – 5 April 2002
SF	13	(Serbia)	Drenovac, Đorđe	1.98 m (6 ft 6 in)	33 – 9 August 1992
C	18	(Hungary)	Czermann, Patrik	2.10 m (6 ft 11 in)	22 – 23 February 2003
PF	20	(Hungary)	Garamvölgyi, Ákos	2.00 m (6 ft 7 in)	31 – 28 January 1994
PF	21	(Serbia)	Ostojić, Danilo	2.06 m (6 ft 9 in)	29 – 11 May 1996
PG	22	(Hungary)	Pongó, Máté	1.83 m (6 ft 0 in)	31 – 25 December 1993
SG	24	(Hungary)	Mócsán, Bálint (C)	1.95 m (6 ft 5 in)	28 – 18 June 1997
PG	27	(Hungary)	Ságodi, Róbert	1.82 m (6 ft 0 in)	21 – 22 May 2004
PF	28	(Hungary)	Hegedűs, Brúnó	2.00 m (6 ft 7 in)	21 – 18 June 2004
C	33	(Hungary)	Flasár, Botond	2.02 m (6 ft 8 in)	20 – 1 January 2005
PF	50	(United States)	Williamson, Andre	2.02 m (6 ft 8 in)	36 – 13 October 1989
SG	56	(Hungary)	Várszegi, Ádám	1.95 m (6 ft 5 in)	21 – 16 July 2004
SG	57	(Hungary)	Kovács, Ákos	2.05 m (6 ft 9 in)	22 – 12 March 2003
SG	68	(Hungary)	Balázsi, Ákos	1.93 m (6 ft 4 in)	20 – 1 January 2005
PG	88	(Hungary)	Hőgye, Patrik	1.93 m (6 ft 4 in)	20 – 12 April 2005
		(Hungary)	Varga, Sándor	1.86 m (6 ft 1 in)	22 – 1 January 2003

Head coach

- (Hungary) Ákos Pethő

Assistant coach(es)

- (Hungary) Barna Jávor

Legend

- (C) Team captain
- Injured

- Roster
Updated: 11 August 2024

=== Transactions ===
==== In ====
No.	Pos.	Nat.	Name	Age	Moving from		Type	Ends	Transfer fee	Date	Source
	PG	(Hungary)	Máté Pongó	31	Szolnok	(Hungary)	Transfer			1 June 2024	
	PG	(United States)	Kyan Anderson	33	Ankaragucu	(Turkey)	Transfer			24 June 2024	
	PF	(Serbia)	Danilo Ostojić	29	Zalaegerszeg	(Hungary)	Transfer			8 July 2024	

==== Out ====
No.	Pos.	Nat.	Name	Age	Moving to		Type	Transfer fee	Date	Source
0	PF	(Hungary)	Csongor Fekete	21						
8	C	(Croatia)	Lovro Buljević	27						
9	PG	(Serbia)	Tadija Tadić	26	Kumanovo	(North Macedonia)				
15	PG	(United States)	Deon Edwin	33	MZT Skopje	(North Macedonia)				

=== Managerial changes ===
Outgoing manager	Manner of departure	Date of vacancy	Position in table	Incoming manager	Date of appointment
(Serbia) Anđelko Mandić	Resigned	18 March 2025	7th	(Hungary) Ákos Pethő	18 March 2025

== Pre-season and friendlies ==
=== Pre-season ===
23 August 2024 Friendly	DEAC	89–68	Hübner Nyíregyháza	Debrecen
18:30	Scoring by quarter: 19–21, 28–14, 18–20, 24–13
	Pts: Drenovac 23/3	Boxscore	Pts: Komma 16	Arena: Oláh Gábor Sports Hall
Note: DEAC: M. Pongó 9/3, Anderson 19/12, Drenovac 23/3, Williamson 15/3, Ostojić 7 • Substitutions: Neuwirth 9/6, Garamvölgyi 3, Hőgye 2, Várszegi 2

30 August 2024 Friendly	DEAC	72–59	(Slovakia) Spišskí Rytieri	Debrecen
17:00	Scoring by quarter: 17–15, 13–17, 23–17, 19–10
	Pts: Drenovac 21/9	Boxscore	Pts: Frey 10/6, Walker 10	Arena: Oláh Gábor Sports Hall
Note: DEAC: M. Pongó 12/6, Anderson 9/9, Drenovac 21/9, Williamson 11, Ostojić 12 • Substitutions: Neuwirth 3/3, Garamvölgyi 4, Hőgye

31 August 2024 Friendly	DEAC	72–85	(Romania) CSM CSU Oradea	Debrecen
14:00	Scoring by quarter: 16–26, 15–20, 22–18, 19–21
	Pts: Drenovac 27/3	Boxscore	Pts: Pridgett 18/6	Arena: Oláh Gábor Sports Hall
Note: DEAC: Anderson 14/6, M. Pongó 8/6, Drenovac 27/3, Williamson 12, Ostojić 10 • Substitutions: Neuwirth, Garamvölgyi, Hőgye 1

4 September 2024 Friendly	DEAC	84–58	SZTE-Szedeák (Szeged)	Debrecen
17:00	Scoring by quarter: 26–17, 22–18, 13–10
	Pts: Drenovac 21/6	Boxscore	Pts: Langley 13/3	Arena: Oláh Gábor Sports Hall
Note: DEAC: Anderson 16/9, M. Pongó 6/6, Drenovac 21/6, Williamson 12/3, Ostojić 10 • Substitutions: Neuwirth 3/3, Garamvölgyi 2, Hőgye 3/3, Kovács 5/3, Várszegi, Czermann 6, Balázsi

6 September 2024 Friendly	Atomerőmű SE	79–65	DEAC	Nyíregyháza
16:00	Scoring by quarter: 14–10, 12–15, 33–16, 19–24
	Pts: Chandler 24/9	Boxscore	Pts: Drenovac 18/6
Note: DEAC: Anderson 10/6, M. Pongó 7/3, Drenovac 18/6, Williamson 8, Ostojić 9 • Substitutions: Neuwirth 9/6, Garamvölgyi 2, Hőgye, Á. Kovács 2, Várszegi, Czermann

7 September 2024 Friendly	Hübner Nyíregyháza	59–70	DEAC	Nyíregyháza
14:00 or 6:00	Scoring by quarter: 8–21, 14–16, 17–17, 20–16
	Pts: Locure 16/6	Boxscore	Pts: Drenovac 23/3
Note: DEAC: Anderson 6, Hőgye 2, Drenovac 23/3, Williamson 5, Ostojić 8 • Substitutions: Neuwirth, M. Pongó 4, Garamvölgyi 8, Á. Kovács 9, Várszegi, Czermann 2, Fekete-Gál 3

11 September 2024 Friendly	SZTE-Szedeák (Szeged)	76–74	DEAC	Szeged
17:00	Scoring by quarter: 10–23, 22–18, 19–25, 25–8
	Pts: Langley 14/3	Boxscore	Pts: Drenovac 28/9
Note: DEAC: M. Pongó 7/3, Anderson 9/3, Drenovac 28/9, Williamson 7, Ostojić 2 • Substitutions: Garamvölgyi 10, Neuwirth, Á. Kovács 8, Várszegi 3/3, Hőgye

12 September 2024 Friendly	KK Gajdobra (Serbian II) (Serbia)	80–56	DEAC	Gajdobra, Serbia
17:00	Scoring by quarter: 20–10, 29–13, 17–18, 14–15
	Pts: Drenovac 15/6	Boxscore		Arena: Gajdobra Sports Center
Note: DEAC: M. Pongó 3/3, Hőgye 2, Drenovac 15/6, Williamson 5, Ostojić • Substitutions: Neuwirth 8/6, Anderson 5/3, Á. Kovács 7/3, Várszegi 5/3, Balázsi 4, Fekete-Gál 2, Czermann

13 September 2024 Friendly	KK Vojvodina (Serbian I) (Serbia)	55–75	DEAC	Novi Sad, Serbia
17:00	Scoring by quarter: 7–24, 20–16, 19–16, 9–19
		Boxscore	Pts: Ostojić 20	Arena: SPC Vojvodina
Note: DEAC: M. Pongó 6/6, Anderson 18/6, Drenovac 18/3, Williamson 11/6, Ostojić 20 • Substitutions: Neuwirth, Garamvölgyi 2, Kovács, Hőgye, Czermann

14 September 2024 Friendly	KK Joker (Serbian I) (Serbia)	81–82	DEAC	Sombor, Serbia
17:00	Scoring by quarter: 23–31, 18–10, 20–20, 20–21
		Boxscore	Pts: Drenovac 21/9	Arena: Mostonga Hall
Note: DEAC: M. Pongó 8/6, Anderson 20/12, Drenovac 21/9, Williamson 9, Ostojić 13 • Substitutions: Neuwirth, Garamvölgyi 6, Hőgye 5/3, Kovács, Várszegi

21 September 2024 Friendly	NHSZ-Szolnoki Olajbányász	70–80	DEAC	Szolnok
	Scoring by quarter: 16–15, 14–27, 27–16, 13–22
	Pts: Jovanović 16/9	Boxscore	Pts: Drenovac 24/6	Arena: Tiszaligeti Sportcsarnok
Note: DEAC: M. Pongó 5/3, Anderson 17/9, Drenovac 24/6, Williamson 6, Ostojić 19 • Substitutions: Garamvölgyi 4, Hőgye 2

=== In-season ===
19 November 2024 Friendly	Endo Plus Service-Honvéd	81–72	DEAC	Budapest
16:00	Scoring by quarter: 27–14, 12–16, 19–23, 23–19
	Pts: Grubor 21/9	Boxscore	Pts: Drenovac 17/3	Arena: Ludovika Arena
Note: DEAC: M. Pongó 9/3, Anderson 9, Drenovac 17/3, Williamson 8, Garamvölgyi 3 • Substitutions: Kovács 4, Neuwirth 11/6, Várszegi 8/6, Czermann, Varga 3/3, Hegedűs

== Competitions ==
=== Overview ===
In italics, we indicate the Last match and the Final position achieved in competition(s) that have not yet been completed.

Competition	First match	Last match	Starting round	Final position	Record							
Competition	First match	Last match	Starting round	Final position	Pld	W	D	L	PF	PA	PD	Win %
Nemzeti Bajnokság I/A; Regular Season	27 September 2024	12 April 2025	Round 1	4th	26	15	0	11	1,945	1,943	+2	57.69
Nemzeti Bajnokság I/A; Play-off	19 April 2025	18 May 2025	Quarter-finals	5th	8	5	0	3	692	666	+26	62.50
Hungarian Cup	18 January 2025	9 March 2025	Quarter-final	4th	3	1	0	2	246	252	−6	33.33
Total					37	21	0	16	2,883	2,861	+22	56.76

Last updated: 18 May 2025
Source: HunBasket – DEAC https://hunbasket.hu/csapat/x2425/hun/40000/deac

=== Nemzeti Bajnokság I/A ===
==== Results summary ====
Overall						Home					Away				
Pld	W	L	PF	PA	PD	W	L	PF	PA	PD	W	L	PF	PA	PD
26	15	11	1945	1943	+2	8	5	942	913	+29	7	6	1003	1030	−27

Last updated: 12 April 2025.
Source: Competitive matches

==== Results by round ====
Round	1	2	4	5	6	8	9	10	7^{2}	11	12	3^{1}	13	15	16	17	18	14^{3}	19	20	21	22	23	24	25	26
Ground	A	H	H	A	H	A	H	A	A	H	A	A	H	A	H	A	H	H	A	H	H	A	H	A	H	A
Result	l	W	W	W	L	W	W	L	L	L	W	L	W	W	W	W	L	W	L	L	L	L	W	W	W	W
Position	8	8	6	5	6	5	4	4	4	6	4	5	5	5	4	4	4	4	5	5	5	7	7	6	5	4
Manager	M	M	M	M	M	M	M	M	M	M	M	M	M	M	M	M	M	M	M	M	M	M	P	P	P	P

Updated to match(es) played on 12 April 2025. Source: Competitive matches
A = Away; H = Home; W = Win; L = Loss; R = Rest; l = Overtime loss; w = Overtime win
Notes:
^{1} Round 3 match (Alba Fehérvár–DEAC) has been postponed after Round 12 (18 Dec 2024).

^{2} Round 7 match (Falco–DEAC) has been postponed after Round 10 (4 Dec 2024).
^{3} Round 14 match (DEAC–Sopron) has been postponed after Round 18 (4 Feb 2025).
Manager: • M Anđelko Mandić • P Ákos Pethő

==== Matches ====
Win Loss

27 September 2024 1	Sopron	80–79(OT)	DEAC	Sopron
19:00	Scoring by quarter: 18–24, 20–7, 17–25, 19–18, Overtime: 6–5
	Pts: Garrett 16; Rebs: Molnár 10; Asts: Edwards 5 PIR: Edwards 23	Boxscore	Pts: Anderson 25; Rebs: Ostojić 10; Asts: Anderson 8 PIR: Anderson 37	Arena: Novomatic Aréna; Attendance: 1,600; Referees: Kapitány, Minár, Major

4 October 2024 2	DEAC	84–66	Endo Plus Service-Honvéd	Debrecen
18:30	Scoring by quarter: 21–14, 18–18, 20–15, 25–19
	Pts: Drenovac 24; Rebs: Ostojić, Williamson 8 Asts: Anderson 7 PIR: Drenovac 27	Boxscore	Pts: Mucza 16; Rebs: Bajo 7 Asts: Kopácsi 5 PIR: Mucza 21	Arena: Oláh Gábor Sports Hall; Referees: Földházi, Györfy, Rácz

12 October 2024 4	DEAC	75–68	PVSK-VEOLIA	Debrecen
18:00	Scoring by quarter: 21–13, 14–14, 22–21, 18–20
	Pts: Drenovac 25; Rebs: Ostojić, Williamson 8 Asts: Anderson 8 PIR: Drenovac 34	Boxscore	Pts: Archibald 24; Rebs: Payton 9 Asts: Archibald 4 PIR: Archibald 35	Arena: Oláh Gábor Sports Hall; Attendance: 1,000; Referees: Goda, Makrai, Sörlei

19 October 2024 5	Egis Körmend	80–85	DEAC	Körmend
18:00	Scoring by quarter: 18–28, 23–14, 13–15, 26–28
	Pts: Williams 24; Rebs: Williams 8 Asts: Williams 5 PIR: Williams 38	Boxscore	Pts: Drenovac 27; Rebs: Ostojić, Williamson 7 Asts: Pongó 7 PIR: Ostojić 30	Arena: Városi Sportcsarnok; Attendance: 1,900; Referees: Benczur, Fodor, Kapusi

24 October 2024 6	DEAC	54–82	Atomerőmű (Paks)	Debrecen
18:30	Scoring by quarter: 15–22, 11–19, 14–22, 14–19
	Pts: Anderson 13; Rebs: Ostojić 10; Asts: Pongó 4 PIR: Pongó 15	Boxscore	Pts: Chandler 26; Rebs: Dorogi 9 Asts: Lockett 6 PIR: Chandler 24	Arena: Oláh Gábor Sports Hall; Attendance: 1,000; Referees: Földházi, Dr. Mészáros, Horváth

5 November 2024 8	NKA Universitas Pécs	68–80	DEAC	Pécs
18:00	Scoring by quarter: 16–34, 22–19, 20–16, 10–11
	Pts: Nikolic, Abell 15; Rebs: Kerpel-Fronius 8 Asts: Nikolic 7 PIR: Nikolic 26	Boxscore	Pts: Drenovac 20; Rebs: Ostojić 11; Asts: Pongó 7 PIR: Ostojić 35	Arena: NKA Center; Attendance: 750; Referees: V. Nagy, Minár, Nepp

9 November 2024 9	DEAC	68–62	Zalakerámia (Zalaegerszeg)	Debrecen
18:00	Scoring by quarter: 19–14, 16–16, 14–15, 19–17
	Pts: Anderson 23; Rebs: Ostojić 8 Asts: Anderson 5 PIR: Anderson 26	Boxscore	Pts: Bigelow 18; Rebs: Bigelow 8 Asts: Brown, Takács 3 PIR: Bigelow 21	Arena: Oláh Gábor Sports Hall; Attendance: 800; Referees: Cziffra, Nyilas, Jakab

30 November 2024 10	NHSZ-Szolnoki Olajbányász	80–67	DEAC	Szolnok
18:00	Scoring by quarter: 13–17, 28–21, 22–13, 17–16
	Pts: Tamás Pallai 18; Rebs: Aimaq 21; Asts: Jovanović, Subotić 4 PIR: Aimaq 35	Boxscore	Pts: Drenovac 19; Rebs: Williamson 11; Asts: Anderson 6 PIR: Williamson 22	Arena: Tiszaligeti Sportcsarnok; Attendance: 1,800; Referees: Kapitány, Frányó, N. Kovács
Note: Pongó 7/3, Anderson 8/6, Drenovac 19/6, Williamson 10/6, Garamvölgyi 9/3 • Substitutions: Hőgye 6/3, Kovács 4, Neuwirth, Flasár 2, Fekete-Gál 2, Czermann

4 December 2024 7	Falco-Vulcano Energia KC (Szombathely)	85–47	DEAC	Szombathely
18:00	Scoring by quarter: 28–14, 19–7, 17–19, 21–7
	Pts: Perl 14; Rebs: Tiby 9 Asts: Váradi 8 PIR: Tiby 23	Boxscore	Pts: Á. Kovács 10; Rebs: Czermann 7 Asts: Anderson, Hőgye 3 PIR: Czermann 13	Arena: Arena Savaria; Attendance: 2,790; Referees: Nagy, Minár, Jankovics

9 December 2024 11	DEAC	62–70	DTKH Kecskemét	Debrecen
18:30	Scoring by quarter: 16–18, 21–16, 10–21, 15–15
	Pts: Drenovac 21; Rebs: Williamson 8 Asts: Pongó 6 PIR: Williamson 19	Boxscore	Pts: Seppälä 23; Rebs: Rakicevic 12; Asts: Seppälä 6 PIR: Seppälä 29	Arena: Oláh Gábor Sports Hall; Attendance: 800; Referees: Földházi, Csabai-Kaskötő, Fodor

13 December 2024 12	SZTE–Szedeák (Szeged)	74–85	DEAC	Szeged
18:30	Scoring by quarter: 20–25, 13–26, 25–17, 16–17
	Pts: Heath 24; Rebs: Herndon 12; Asts: Balogh 6 PIR: Herndon 29	Boxscore	Pts: Anderson 22; Rebs: Williamson 11; Asts: Pongó 4 PIR: Williamson 29	Arena: Újszegedi Sportcsarnok; Attendance: 1,000; Referees: Goda, Györfy, Frányó

18 December 2024 3	Arconic-Alba Fehérvár (Székesfehérvár)	88–71	DEAC	Székesfehérvár
18:00	Scoring by quarter: 23–10, 16–20, 29–16, 20–25
	Pts: Horne 18; Rebs: three players 5 Asts: Medford 9 PIR: Vojvoda 30	Boxscore	Pts: Drenovac 15; Rebs: Ostojić 11; Asts: Pongó 9 PIR: Ostojić 26	Arena: Alba Regia Sportcsarnok; Attendance: 800; Referees: V. Nagy, Minár, Kapusi

22 December 2024 13	DEAC	89–67	MVM-OSE Lions (Oroszlány)	Debrecen
18:00	Scoring by quarter: 29–6, 15–25, 30–21, 15–15
	Pts: Anderson 31; Rebs: Williamson 13; Asts: Pongó 7 PIR: Drenovac 42	Boxscore	Pts: Dickerson 22; Rebs: Dickerson 12; Asts: Wilson 3 PIR: Dickerson 34	Arena: Oláh Gábor Sports Hall; Attendance: 1,200; Referees: Benczur, Fodor, Sörlei

4 January 2025 15	Endo Plus Service-Honvéd	68–80	DEAC	Budapest
18:00	Scoring by quarter: 18–20, 17–20, 11–20, 22–20
	Pts: Gatling 20; Rebs: Grubor 7 Asts: Simon 5 PIR: Simon 24	Boxscore	Pts: Drenovac 24; Rebs: Ostojić 12; Asts: Pongó 9 PIR: Ostojić 30	Arena: Ludovika Arena; Attendance: 700; Referees: Kapitány, Jakab, N. Kovács

11 January 2025 16	DEAC	81–74	Alba Fehérvár (Székesfehérvár)	Debrecen
18:00	Scoring by quarter: 20–21, 18–23, 24–25, 19–5
	Pts: Ostojić 23; Rebs: Ostojić, Drenovac 8 Asts: Pongó 5 PIR: Ostojić 30	Boxscore	Pts: Vojvoda 16; Rebs: Horne 7 Asts: Vojvoda 7 PIR: Vojvoda, Medford Jr 18	Arena: Oláh Gábor Sports Hall; Attendance: 1,250; Referees: Montgomery-Tóth, Győrffy, Szilágyi

23 January 2025 17	PVSK-VEOLIA	68–84	DEAC	Pécs
18:00	Scoring by quarter: 20–21, 18–18, 17–20, 13–25
	Pts: Archibald 19; Rebs: Archibald, Dzeletovic 9 Asts: Archibald 8 PIR: Archibald 30	Boxscore	Pts: Ostojić 22; Rebs: Garamvölgyi 11; Asts: Pongó 6 PIR: Ostojić 33	Arena: Lauber Dezső Sports Hall; Attendance: 1,000; Referees: Goda, Fodor, Nyilas

31 January 2025 18	DEAC	66–82	Egis Körmend	Debrecen
18:30	Scoring by quarter: 18–24, 11–16, 23–18, 14–24
	Pts: Drenovac 20; Rebs: Williamson 10; Asts: Pongó, Anderson 8 PIR: Williamson 26	Boxscore	Pts: Williams 27; Rebs: Pipiras 10; Asts: Williams 10; PIR: Williams 49	Arena: Oláh Gábor Sports Hall; Attendance: 1,050; Referees: Benczur, V. Nagy, Dr. Németh
Note: DEAC: Anderson 10/6, M. Pongó 11/9, Drenovac 20, Garamvölgyi 2, Ostojić 7 • Substitutions: Mócsán 2, Williamson 14/6, Neuwirth • Coach: Andjelko Mandić

4 February 2024 14	DEAC	75–57	Sopron	Debrecen
18:30	Scoring by quarter: 19–17, 19–11, 24–17, 13–12
	Pts: Drenovac 21; Rebs: Williamson, Ostojić 9 Asts: Drenovac, Anderson 3 PIR: Ostojić 24	Boxscore	Pts: Edwards 13; Rebs: Molnár 7 Asts: Meszlényi 3 PIR: Edwards 17	Arena: Oláh Gábor Sports Hall; Attendance: 900; Referees: Mészáros, Makrai, Söjtöry
Note: DEAC: Anderson 13/9, M. Pongó 9, Drenovac 21/9, Williamson 8, Ostojić 14 • Substitutions: Mócsán 8/3, Hőgye, Garamvölgyi, Neuwirth, Flasár B. 2, Á. Kovács • Coach: Andjelko Mandić

8 February 2025 19	Atomerőmű (Paks)	82–78	DEAC	Paks
18:00	Scoring by quarter: 19–20, 12–26, 20–18, 31–14
	Pts: Chandler 36; Rebs: Oduro 14; Asts: Lockett 3 PIR: Chandler 35	Boxscore	Pts: Anderson 25; Rebs: Ostojić 8 Asts: Anderson 7 PIR: Anderson 28	Arena: ASE Sports Hall; Attendance: 1,000; Referees: Praksch, Nyilas, Szilágyi
Note: DEAC: Anderson 25/12, M. Pongó 8/3, Mócsán 16/12, Williamson 14/9, Ostojić 13 • Substitutions: Garamvölgyi 2, Hőgye • Coach: Andjelko Mandić

12 February 2025 20	DEAC	65–87	Falco-Vulcano Energia KC (Szombathely)	Debrecen
18:30	Scoring by quarter: 10–27, 17–19, 22–17, 16–24
	Pts: Drenovac 16; Rebs: Williamson 6 Asts: Má. Pongó, Drenovac 4 PIR: Drenovac 18	Boxscore	Pts: Perl 19; Rebs: Popović 8 Asts: Ma. Pongó, Perl 7 PIR: Perl 29	Arena: Oláh Gábor Sports Hall; Attendance: 1,150; Referees: Cziffra, Győrffy, Nepp
Note: DEAC: Anderson 3, M. Pongó 5/3, Drenovac 16, Williamson 8, Ostojić 12 • Substitutions: Mócsán 7/6, Á. Kovács 8, Hőgye 2, Garamvölgyi 2, Neuwirth, Ságodi 2, Várszegi • Coach: Andjelko Mandić

1 March 2025 21	DEAC	68–78	NKA Universitas Pécs	Debrecen
18:00	Scoring by quarter: 23–19, 13–15, 16–24, 16–20
	Pts:' Ostojić 19; Rebs: Drenovac 8 Asts: three players 3 PIR: Ostojić 28	Boxscore	Pts: Durham 20; Rebs: Brodie, Meleg 9 Asts: Durham 6 PIR: Durmo 23	Arena: Oláh Gábor Sports Hall; Attendance: 950; Referees: Győrffy, Söjtöry, Zs. Rácz
Note: DEAC: Anderson 14/3, M. Pongó 11/9, Drenovac 9/3, Williamson 11/6, Ostojić 19 • Substitutions: Mócsán 2, Hőgye, Á. Kovács 2 • Coach: Andjelko Mandić

16 March 2025 22	Zalakerámia (Zalaegerszeg)	103–84	DEAC	Zalaegerszeg
18:00	Scoring by quarter: 30–15, 28–25, 23–22, 22–22
	Pts: Garrett 23; Rebs: Bigelow 11; Asts: Bigelow, Garrett 6 PIR: Bigelow 30	Boxscore	Pts: Mócsán 17; Rebs: Williamson 7 Asts: Anderson 7 PIR: Anderson 22	Arena: Városi Sportcsarnok; Attendance: 1,240; Referees: Praksch, Minár, Kapusi
Note: DEAC: M. Pongó 15/9, Anderson 12/3, Mócsán 17/12, Williamson 10, Ostojić 12 • Substitutions: Drenovac 12, Hőgye 2, Neuwirth, Á. Kovács 2, Flasár 2, Fekete-Gál • Coach: Andjelko Mandić

22 March 2025 23	DEAC	82–69	NHSZ-Szolnoki Olajbányász	Debrecen
18:00	Scoring by quarter: 22–17, 25–14, 25–26, 10–12
	Pts: Drenovac 23; Rebs: Williamson 8 Asts: M. Pongó 7 PIR: Drenovac, Mócsán 22	Boxscore	Pts: Aimaq 16; Rebs: Subotić 11; Asts: Somogyi 6 PIR: Subotić 21	Arena: Oláh Gábor Sports Hall; Attendance: 1,150; Referees: Benczur, Jakab, Szilágyi
Note: DEAC: Anderson 11/6, Mócsán 21/18, Drenovac 23/3, Á. Kovács 5, Williamson 8/3 • Substitutions: Ostojić 8, M. Pongó 2, Hőgye 4, Garamvölgyi, Neuwirth, Flasár, Fekete-Gál • Coach: Ákos Pethő

28 March 2025 24	DTKH Kecskemét	78–80	DEAC	Kecskemét
18:00	Scoring by quarter: 29–16, 9–21, 17–20, 23–23
	Pts: Seppälä 21; Rebs: Rakićević 9 Asts: Seppälä 5 PIR: Lee III 24	Boxscore	Pts: Drenovac 18; Rebs: Williamson, Ostojić 6 Asts: M. Pongó 7 PIR: Drenovac 21	Arena: Messzi István Sportcsarnok; Attendance: 500; Referees: Kapitány, Nyilas, N. Kovács
Note: DEAC: M. Pongó 12/6, Mócsán 13/9, Drenovac 18/3, Williamson 12/6, Ostojić 9 • Substitutions: Anderson 5, Á. Kovács 7, Hőgye 2, Garamvölgyi 2 • Coach: Ákos Pethő

5 April 2025 25	DEAC	73–51	SZTE-Szedeák (Szeged)	Debrecen
18:00	Scoring by quarter: 21–10, 17–14, 17–10, 18–17
	Pts: Drenovac 17; Rebs: Ostojić 9 Asts: M. Pongó 5 PIR: Ostojić 23	Boxscore	Pts: Glišić 17; Rebs: Glišić 15; Asts: Vulikić 6 PIR: Glišić 28	Arena: Oláh Gábor Sports Hall; Attendance: 1,050; Referees: Földházi, Győrffy, Rácz
Note: DEAC: Anderson 6/6, Mócsán 10/6, Drenovac 17/3, Williamson 5/3, Ostojić 12 • Substitutions: M. Pongó 9/3, Hőgye 4, Á. Kovács 6/3, Garamvölgyi, Neuwirth 2, Czermann 2, Várszegi • Coach: Ákos Pethő

12 April 2025 26	MVM-OSE Lions (Oroszlány)	76–83	DEAC	Oroszlány
18:00	Scoring by quarter: 22–22, 18–29, 21–13, 15–19
	Pts: Wilson 25; Rebs: Dickerson 11; Asts: Ruják 4 PIR: Dickerson 26	Boxscore	Pts: Ostojić 23; Rebs: Williamson 10; Asts: Anderson 5 PIR: Drenovac, Ostojić 27	Arena: Krajnyik András Sports Hall; Attendance: 844; Referees: Mészáros, Török, Sörlei
Note: DEAC: Anderson 11/3, Mócsán, Drenovac 20, Williamson 6, Ostojić 23 • Substitutions: M. Pongó 7, Á. Kovács 6/6, Hőgye 2, Garamvölgyi 5, Neuwirth 3/3 • Coach: Ákos Pethő

===== Results overview =====
All results are indicated from the perspective of DEAC.
We indicate in parentheses the number of round.

Opponent	City	Home score	Away score	Double
Alba Fehérvár	Székesfehérvár	81–74 (16)	71–88 (3)	152–162
Atomerőmű SE	Paks	54–82 (6)	78–82 (19)	132–164
Budapesti Honvéd	Budapest	84–66 (2)	80–68 (15)	164–134
Falco-Vulcano Energia KC	Szombathely	65–87 (20)	47–85 (7)	112–172
Duna Aszfalt-DTKH	Kecskemét	62–70 (11)	80–78 (24)	142–148
Egis Körmend	Körmend	66–82 (18)	85–80 (5)	151–162
MVM-OSE Lions	Oroszlány	89–67 (13)	83–76 (26)	172–143
NKA Universitas Pécs	Pécs	68–78 (21)	80–68 (8)	148–146
PVSK-VEOLIA	Pécs	75–68 (4)	84–68 (17)	159–136
Sopron KC	Sopron	75–57 (14)	79–80 (1)	154–137
SZTE-Szedeák	Szeged	73–51 (25)	85–74 (12)	158–125
NHSZ-Szolnoki Olajbányász	Szolnok	82–69 (23)	67–80 (10)	149–149
Zalakerámia ZTE KK	Zalaegerszeg	68–62 (9)	84–103 (22)	152–165

==== League table ====
Pos	Team	Pld	W	L	PF	PA	PD	Pts	Qualification
1	Falco-Vulcano Energia KC Szombathely	26	26	0	2489	1887	+602	52	Play-off
2	Atomerőmű SE	26	23	3	2389	2045	+344	49	Play-off
3	NHSZ-Szolnoki Olajbányász	26	17	9	2187	2145	+42	43	Play-off
4	DEAC	26	15	11	1945	1943	+2	41	Play-off
5	Zalakerámia ZTE KK	26	14	12	2224	2157	+67	40	Play-off
6	Egis Körmend	26	14	12	2288	2302	−14	40	Play-off
7	Sopron KC	26	13	13	2149	2075	+74	39	Play-off
8	Arconic-Alba Fehérvár	26	13	13	2350	2252	+98	39	Play-off
9	NKA Universitas Pécs	26	13	13	2062	2127	−65	39	Playout
10	Endo Plus Service-Honvéd	26	9	17	2023	2139	−116	35	Playout
11	Duna Aszfalt-DTKH Kecskemét	26	8	18	1952	2110	−158	34	Playout
12	MVM-OSE Lions	26	7	19	1995	2248	−253	33	Playout
13	PVSK-VEOLIA	26	5	21	2072	2382	−310	31	Playout
14	SZTE-Szedeák	26	5	21	1899	2212	−313	31	Playout

Updated to match(es) played on 12 April 2025. Source: Hungarian Basketball Federation (in Hungarian), Flashscore
Rules for classification: 1) Games played; 2) Points; 3) Wins; 4) Defeats; 5) Points scored; 6) Points against; 7) Victories/Defeats series; 8) in Home games; 9) as a Guest; 10) Last 5 matches.

==== Results summary ====
Overall						Home					Away				
Pld	W	L	PF	PA	PD	W	L	PF	PA	PD	W	L	PF	PA	PD
8	5	3	692	666	+26	3	1	335	321	+14	2	2	357	345	+12

Last updated: 18 May 2025.
Source: Competitive matches

==== Matches ====
Win Loss

==== Quarter-finals ====
All three rounds of the playoffs were played in a best-of-five format, with the higher seeded team playing the first, third and fifth game at home (if it was necessary).

19 April 2025 QF-G1	DEAC (4)	54–82 (Series: 0–1)	Zalakerámia (Zalaegerszeg) (5)	Debrecen
18:00	Scoring by quarter: 6–21, 17–26, 13–21, 18–14
	Pts: Williamson 9 Rebs: Drenovac, Á. Kovács 6 Asts: Anderson 4 PIR: Williamson 12	Boxscore	Pts: Bigelow 15; Rebs: Bigelow 16; Asts: Keller, McGowens III 5 PIR: Bigelow 22	Arena: Oláh Gábor Sports Hall; Attendance: 1,050; Referees: Mészáros, Goda, Minár
Note: DEAC: Anderson 5/3, Mócsán 6/6, Drenovac 7, Williamson 9/3, Ostojić 4 • Substitutions: M. Pongó 8/6, Á. Kovács 7, Hőgye 3, Garamvölgyi, Neuwirth 1, Flasár B. 2, Várszegi 2 • Coach: Ákos Pethő

22 April 2025 QF-G2	Zalakerámia (Zalaegerszeg) (5)	91–86 (Series: 2–0)	DEAC (4)	Zalaegerszeg
18:00	Scoring by quarter: 26–24, 22–21, 19–24, 24–17
	Pts: Garrett 22; Rebs: Keller 6 Asts: Garrett 5 PIR: Garrett 32	Boxscore	Pts: Anderson 20; Rebs: Williamson 9 Asts: Mócsán 5 PIR: Williamson 28	Arena: Városi Sportcsarnok; Attendance: 1,250; Referees: Praksch, Söjtöry, Popgyákunik
Note: DEAC: Anderson 20/15, Mócsán 2, Drenovac 11, Williamson 19/6, Ostojić 14/3 • Substitutions: M. Pongó 11/9, Á. Kovács 3, Hőgye 3/3, Garamvölgyi 2 • Coach: Ákos Pethő

25 April 2025 QF-G3	DEAC (4)	78–77 (Series: 1–2)	Zalakerámia (Zalaegerszeg) (5)	Debrecen
19:00	Scoring by quarter: 24–21, 20–20, 14–18, 20–18
	Pts: Anderson 19; Rebs: Williamson 8 Asts: Ostojić 5 PIR: Anderson 21	Boxscore	Pts: Bigelow 22; Rebs: Bigelow 14; Asts: Garrett, McGowens III 3 PIR: Bigelow 32	Arena: Oláh Gábor Sports Hall; Attendance: 1,000; Referees: Földházi, Györfy, Németh
Note: DEAC: M. Pongó 5, Anderson 19/9, Drenovac 16, Williamson 8, Ostojić 5 • Substitutions: Mócsán 11/9, Garamvölgyi 5/3, Á. Kovács 7, Hőgye 2 • Coach: Ákos Pethő

28 April 2025 QF-G4	Zalakerámia (Zalaegerszeg) (5)	80–72 (Series: 3–1)	DEAC (4)	Zalaegerszeg
18:00	Scoring by quarter: 23–18, 28–17, 12–19, 17–18
	Pts: Bigelow 23; Rebs: Bigelow 11; Asts: Garrett, McGowens III 5 PIR: Bigelow 30	Boxscore	Pts: Mócsán 22; Rebs: Ostojić 13; Asts: M. Pongó 5 PIR: Á. Kovács 25	Arena: Városi Sportcsarnok; Referees: Kapitány, V. Nagy, Győrffy

==== 5–8th place ====
All two rounds of the playoff for the 5th place were played in a best-of-three format, with the higher seeded team playing the first and third game at home (if it was necessary).

==== Semi-finals ====
2 May 2025 P58-G1	DEAC (4)	97–84 (Series: 1–0)	Alba Fehérvár (8)	Debrecen
18:00	Scoring by quarter: 29–23, 26–20, 21–26, 21–15
	Pts: Drenovac 25; Rebs: Ostojić 8 Asts: Ostojić, Pongó 3 PIR: Ostojić 27	Boxscore	Pts: Medford Jr. 22; Rebs: Krivacevic 12; Asts: Medford Jr. 6 PIR: Krivacevic 28	Arena: Oláh Gábor Sports Hall; Attendance: 650; Referees: Benczur, Fodor, Rácz
Note: DEAC: Anderson 19/9, Mócsán 7/3, Drenovac 25, Á. Kovács 10, Ostojić 15 • Substitutions: M. Pongó 8/6, Hőgye 4, Garamvölgyi 7/3, Neuwirth 2, Flasár, Várszegi, Czermann • Coach: Ákos Pethő

7 May 2025 P58-G2	Alba Fehérvár (8)	98–102(OT) (Series: 0–2)	DEAC (4)	Székesfehérvár
18:00	Scoring by quarter: 25–22, 16–29, 31–17, 17–21, Overtime: 9–13
	Pts: Vojvoda 34; Rebs: Filipovity 9 Asts: Medford Jr. 7 PIR: Vojvoda 34	Boxscore	Pts: Drenovac 27; Rebs: Á. Kovács 10; Asts: M. Pongó 11; PIR: M. Pongó 29	Arena: Alba Regia Sportcsarnok; Attendance: 600; Referees: Praksch, Csabai-Kaskötő, Major
Note: DEAC: Anderson 15/12, Hőgye 5, Drenovac 27/9, Á. Kovács 7, Ostojić 18 • Substitutions: M. Pongó 13/6, Flasár 12/3, Garamvölgyi 2, Fekete-Gál 3/3, Szilágyi • Coach: Ákos Pethő

==== 5–6th place ====
All two rounds of the playoff for the 5th place were played in a best-of-three format, with the higher seeded team playing the first and third game at home (if it was necessary).

14 May 2025 P56-G1	DEAC (4)	108–78 (Series: 1–0)	Egis Körmend (6)	Debrecen
18:00	Scoring by quarter: 25–16, 27–14, 18–28, 36–20
	Pts: Anderson, Á. Kovács 16; Rebs: Ostojić, M. Pongó 7 Asts: Garamvölgyi 6 PIR: M. Pongó 23	Boxscore	Pts: Kountz 18; Rebs: Pipiras 6 Asts: Kountz 6 PIR: Kountz 26	Arena: Oláh Gábor Sports Hall; Attendance: 650; Referees: Földházi, Mészáros, Minár
Note: DEAC: Anderson 16/6, Neuwirth 9/9, Drenovac 10/3, Á. Kovács 16, Ostojić 10 • Substitutions: Hőgye 14/6, M. Pongó 13/9, Garamvölgyi 6/6, Czermann 2, Flasár 3/3, Várszegi 7/3, Balázsi • Coach: Ákos Pethő

18 May 2025 P56-G2	Egis Körmend (6)	76–97 (Series: 0–2)	DEAC (4)	Körmend
17:00	Scoring by quarter: 16–17, 14–27, 17–31, 29–22
	Pts: Durázi 14; Rebs: Vučković 6 Asts: Doktor 3 PIR: Kountz, Pipiras 15	Boxscore	Pts: Ostojić 19; Rebs: Ostojić 9 Asts: M. Pongó 5 PIR: Ostojić 31	Arena: Városi Sportcsarnok; Attendance: 1,900; Referees: Kapitány, Györfy, Nyilas
Note: DEAC: Anderson 7/3, Várszegi 6/6, Drenovac 15/3, Á. Kovács 11, Ostojić 19/3 • Substitutions: M. Pongó 11/3, Garamvölgyi, Fekete-Gál 6/6, Balázsi 3/3, Neuwirth 12/12, Czermann 5, Hegedűs 2 • Coach: Ákos Pethő

5th place.

=== Hungarian Cup ===
==== Results summary ====
Overall						Home					Away				
Pld	W	L	PF	PA	PD	W	L	PF	PA	PD	W	L	PF	PA	PD
3	1	2	246	252	−6	1	0	86	81	+5	0	2	160	171	−11

Last updated: 9 March 2025.
Source: Competitive matches

==== Quarter-final ====
18 January 2025 QF	Debreceni EAC	86–81(OT)	NKA Universitas Pécs	Debrecen
18:00	Scoring by quarter: 18–16, 19–27, 21–14, 16–17, Overtime: 12–7
	Pts: Drenovac 19; Rebs: Ostojić 11; Asts: Anderson 6 PIR: Ostojić 34	Boxscore	Pts: Durmo 28; Rebs: Durmo 15; Asts: Nikolić 7 PIR: Durmo 45	Arena: Oláh Gábor Sports Hall; Attendance: 1,250; Referees: Földházi, Cziffra, Makrai

==== Semi-final ====
8 March 2025 SF	Egis Körmend	82–73	Debreceni EAC	Kaposvár
20:00	Scoring by quarter: 21–22, 22–16, 18–16, 21–19
	Pts: Williams 25	Boxscore	Pts: Drenovac 19	Arena: Kaposvár Aréna; Attendance: 2,200; Referees: Kapitány, Goda, Fodor

==== Bronze medal match ====
9 March 2025 BM	Atomerőmű (Paks)	89–87(OT)	Debreceni EAC	Kaposvár
17:00	Scoring by quarter: 23–30, 20–12, 15–19, 18–15, Overtime: 13–11
	Pts: Chandler III 27	Boxscore	Pts: Drenovac 23	Arena: Kaposvár Aréna; Attendance: 1,000; Referees: V. Nagy, Makrai, Nyilas
