= 2024–25 Nemzeti Bajnokság I/A (men's basketball) =

Tippmix Liga^{1}
- Season: 2024–25
- Dates: 27 September 2024 – 26 May 2025
- Teams: 14
- TV partner: M4 Sport

Regular season
- Top seed: Falco-Vulcano Energia KC Szombathely
- Relegated: PVSK-VEOLIA

Finals
- Champions: NHSZ-Szolnoki Olajbányász (9th title)
- Runners-up: Falco-Vulcano Energia KC Szombathely
- Third place: Atomerőmű SE
- Fourth place: Zalakerámia ZTE KK
- ^{1} Sponsored league name, referring to Tippmix.

The 2024–25 Nemzeti Bajnokság I/A season, also known as Tippmix Férfi NB I/A for sponsorship reasons, is the 94th season of the Nemzeti Bajnokság I/A, the highest professional basketball league in Hungary. Falco Vulcano is the defending champion. It started on 27 September 2024 with the first round of the regular season and will end in May 2025 with the last game of the finals.

== Teams ==
=== Team changes ===
| Promoted from 2023–24 Nemzeti Bajnokság I/B | Relegated from 2023–24 Nemzeti Bajnokság I/A |
|---|---|
| Kaposvári KK | PVSK-VEOLIA |

=== Arenas and locations ===
Location of teams in 2024–25 Nemzeti Bajnokság I/A

The following 14 clubs compete in the Nemzeti Bajnokság I/A during the 2024–25 season:

| Team | City | Arena | Capacity | 2023–24 |
|---|---|---|---|---|
| Alba Fehérvár | Székesfehérvár | Alba Regia Sportcsarnok | 1,850 | 3rd |
| Atomerőmű SE | Paks | ASE Sportcsarnok | 1,560 | 10th |
| DEAC | Debrecen | Oláh Gábor utcai Sportcsarnok | 1,500 | 8th |
| Falco Szombathely | Szombathely | Arena Savaria | 3,500 | 1st |
| Budapesti Honvéd | Budapest | Ludovika Aréna | 1,350 | 5th |
| KTE-Duna Aszfalt | Kecskemét | Messzi István Sportcsarnok | 1,851 | 13th |
| Egis Körmend | Körmend | Városi Sportcsarnok | 2,002 | 11th |
| OSE Lions | Oroszlány | Krajnyik András Sportcsarnok | 1,400 | 9th |
| NKA Universitas Pécs | Pécs | Nemzeti Kosárlabda Akadémia | 412 | 6th |
| PVSK Panthers | Pécs | Lauber Dezső Sports Hall | 3,036 | 1st (NB I/B - Red) |
| Soproni KC | Sopron | Novomatic Aréna | 1,250 | 7th |
| SZTE-Szedeák | Szeged | Városi Sportcsarnok | 3,017 | 12th |
| Szolnoki Olajbányász | Szolnok | Tiszaligeti Sportcsarnok | 2,122 | 2nd |
| Zalakerámia ZTE | Zalaegerszeg | Városi Sportcsarnok | 2,210 | 4th |

==== Number of teams by counties and regions ====
Number of teams by counties
| Pos. | County (megye) | No. of teams | Teams |
|---|---|---|---|
| 1 | Baranya | 2 | NKA Universitas Pécs and PVSK-VEOLIA |
| 1 | Vas | 2 | Falco Szombathely and Egis Körmend |
| 2 | Bács-Kiskun | 1 | KTE-Duna Aszfalt |
| 2 | Budapest | 1 | Budapesti Honvéd |
| 2 | Csongrád-Csanád | 1 | SZTE-Szedeák |
| 2 | Fejér | 1 | Alba Fehérvár |
| 2 | Győr-Moson-Sopron | 1 | Soproni KC |
| 2 | Hajdú-Bihar | 1 | DEAC |
| 2 | Jász-Nagykun-Szolnok | 1 | Szolnoki Olajbányász |
| 2 | Komárom-Esztergom | 1 | OSE Lions |
| 2 | Tolna | 1 | Atomerőmű SE |
| 2 | Zala | 1 | Zalakerámai ZTE |

Number of teams by regions
| Transdanubia | Central Hungary | Great Plain and North |
|---|---|---|
| Alba Fehérvár; Atomerőmű SE; Falco Szombathely; Egis Körmend; NKA Universitas Pécs; PVSK-VEOLIA; OSE Lions; Soproni KC; Zalakerámia ZTE | Budapesti Honvéd | DEAC; KTE-Duna Aszfalt; SZTE-Szedeák; Szolnoki Olajbányász |
| 9 Teams | 1 Team | 4 Teams |

=== Personnel and kits ===
All teams were obligated the Hungarian national sports betting brand Tippmix sponsored all 14 teams of the first league since February 2019, their logo were present on all team kits.

| Team | Head coach | Captain | Kit maker | Main kit sponsors | |
| Team | Head coach | Captain | Kit maker | Main | Other(s) |
|---|---|---|---|---|---|
| Arconic-Alba Fehérvár | (Spain) Alejandro Zubillaga | (Hungary) Dávid Vojvoda | Macron | City of Székesfehérvár, Endo Plus Service and PatikaPlus | List: Shorts: Arconic and Volkswagen |
| Atomerőmű SE | (Greece) Kostas Flevarakis | | Adidas | Atomerőmű | List: Shorts: City of Paks and Mercarius |
| Budapesti Honvéd | (Bosnia and Herzegovina) Zlatko Jovanović | | Toti Sport | None | List: Shorts: Endo Plus Service |
| DEAC | (Hungary) Ákos Pethő | (Hungary) Bálint Mócsán | Macron | None | List: Chest (less): University of Debrecen; Back: Campus Festival; Shorts: Delta |
| Falco Szombathely | (Slovenia) Miloš Konakov | (Hungary) Zoltán Perl | DRK | Vulcano energia | List: Chest (less): Volvo Alpok Auto, Red Mobilshop, Trend optika, City of Szombathely; Back: Union Insurance, Szkendó; Shorts: Király Park Hotel |
| KTE-Duna Aszfalt | (Croatia) (Hungary) Stojan Ivković | (Hungary) Krisztián Wittmann | Ziccer | Duna Aszfalt | List: Chest (less): Medi-Print; Back: DTKH, Nemzeti Kosárlabda Akadémia; Shorts: Leveller, BioTech USA |
| Egis Körmend | (Hungary) Tamás Kocsis | (Hungary) Csaba Ferencz | Nike | Egis | None |
| OSE Lions | (Hungary) Kornél Váradi | (Hungary) Máté Illés | DRK | MVM | None |
| NKA Universitas Pécs | (Hungary) Ferenc Csirke | | Six | University of Pécs, exim | List: Back: AutoCity VW; Shorts: Rátgéber Akadémia |
| PVSK-VEOLIA | (Bosnia and Herzegovina) Bojan Salatic | (Hungary) Csanád Antóni | McNut | City of Pécs, Veolia, Schuller Eh'klar, FC Autóház and Terra21 | List: Shorts: Cargate |
| Soproni KC | (Slovenia) Gašper Potočnik | | DRK | None | List: Chest (less): City of Sopron; Back: nemes bau; Shorts: Tercia Restaurant, NKA Rátgéber Akadémia |
| SZTE-Szedeák | (Hungary) Árpád Simándi | | DRK | City of Szeged | List: Back: University of Szeged; Shorts: Solvo, PizzaMonkey |
| Szolnoki Olajbányász | (Serbia) Oliver Vidin | | Spalding | NHSZ Zounok | List: Shorts: Szilaj 2000 |
| Zalakerámia ZTE | (Germany) Matthias Zollner | | Spalding | Zalakerámia, HunGast | List: Chest (less): City of Zalaegerszeg |

== Regular season ==
=== League table ===
| Pos | Team | Pld | W | L | PF | PA | PD | Pts | Qualification |
|---|---|---|---|---|---|---|---|---|---|
| 1 | Falco-Vulcano Energia KC Szombathely | 26 | 26 | 0 | 2489 | 1887 | +602 | 52 | Playoffs |
| 2 | Atomerőmű SE | 26 | 23 | 3 | 2389 | 2045 | +344 | 49 | Playoffs |
| 3 | NHSZ-Szolnoki Olajbányász | 26 | 17 | 9 | 2187 | 2145 | +42 | 43 | Playoffs |
| 4 | DEAC | 26 | 15 | 11 | 1945 | 1943 | +2 | 41 | Playoffs |
| 5 | Zalakerámia ZTE KK | 26 | 14 | 12 | 2224 | 2157 | +67 | 40 | Playoffs |
| 6 | Egis Körmend | 26 | 14 | 12 | 2288 | 2302 | −14 | 40 | Playoffs |
| 7 | Sopron KC | 26 | 13 | 13 | 2149 | 2075 | +74 | 39 | Playoffs |
| 8 | Arconic-Alba Fehérvár | 26 | 13 | 13 | 2350 | 2252 | +98 | 39 | Playoffs |
| 9 | NKA Universitas Pécs | 26 | 13 | 13 | 2062 | 2127 | −65 | 39 | Playout |
| 10 | Endo Plus Service-Honvéd | 26 | 9 | 17 | 2023 | 2139 | −116 | 35 | Playout |
| 11 | Duna Aszfalt-DTKH Kecskemét | 26 | 8 | 18 | 1952 | 2110 | −158 | 34 | Playout |
| 12 | MVM-OSE Lions | 26 | 7 | 19 | 1995 | 2248 | −253 | 33 | Playout |
| 13 | PVSK-VEOLIA | 26 | 5 | 21 | 2072 | 2382 | −310 | 31 | Playout |
| 14 | SZTE-Szedeák | 26 | 5 | 21 | 1899 | 2212 | −313 | 31 | Playout |

Updated to match(es) played on 12 April 2025. Source: Hungarian Basketball Federation (in Hungarian), Flashscore
Rules for classification: 1) Games played; 2) Points; 3) Wins; 4) Defeats; 5) Points scored; 6) Points against; 7) Victories/Defeats series; 8) in Home games; 9) as a Guest; 10) Last 5 matches.

=== Results ===
In the table below the home teams are listed on the left and the away teams along the top.

| Home \ Away | ALB | ASE | DEA | FAL | KOR | KTE | HON | NKA | OSE | PVS | SOP | SZE | SZO | ZTE |
|---|---|---|---|---|---|---|---|---|---|---|---|---|---|---|
| Arconic-Alba Fehérvár | — | 75–82 | 88–71 | 73–100 | 114–86 | 86–88 | 97–88 | 102–78 | 97–76 | 123–84 | 107–88 | 110–85 | 84–101 | 97–92 |
| Atomerőmű SE | 92–85 | — | 82–78 | 70–85 | 88–76 | 91–77 | 94–79 | 102–81 | 104–85 | 103–88 | 97–92 | 109–76 | 110–77 | 88–71 |
| DEAC | 81–74 | 54–82 | — | 65–87 | 66–82 | 62–70 | 84–66 | 68–78 | 89–67 | 75–68 | 75–57 | 73–51 | 82–69 | 68–62 |
| Falco-Vulcano Energia KC Szombathely | 103–83 | 87–77 | 85–47 | — | 91–81 | 102–60 | 121–118 | 91–81 | 101–67 | 94–58 | 100–82 | 95–75 | 101–73 | 78–62 |
| Egis Körmend | 75–93 | 81–95 | 80–85 | 75–105 | — | 82–80 | 93–87 | 106–95 | 103–71 | 91–84 | 85–89 | 83–77 | 103–101 | 91–78 |
| Duna Aszfalt-DTKH Kecskemét | 98–79 | 68–86 | 78–80 | 67–98 | 81–97 | — | 76–78 | 63–80 | 84–75 | 69–78 | 75–72 | 70–74 | 72–80 | 92–86 |
| Endo Plus Service-Honvéd | 72–89 | 60–91 | 68–80 | 67–89 | 83–84 | 58–87 | — | 79–84 | 81–77 | 89–72 | 64–73 | 71–50 | 77–86 | 101–70 |
| NKA Universitas Pécs | 79–70 | 61–78 | 68–80 | 61–86 | 87–96 | 82–64 | 55–72 | — | 81–73 | 104–71 | 81–70 | 91–66 | 75–82 | 92–90 |
| MVM-OSE Lions | 97–93 | 74–95 | 76–83 | 69–102 | 77–103 | 94–62 | 73–77 | 69–80 | — | 79–78 | 68–80 | 90–83 | 80–74 | 83–78 |
| PVSK-VEOLIA | 88–97 | 81–103 | 68–84 | 73–122 | 91–82 | 88–76 | 89–92 | 91–94 | 71–78 | — | 91–85 | 90–79 | 88–99 | 82–98 |
| Sopron KC | 86–70 | 96–101 | 80–79 | 76–89 | 92–84 | 87–79 | 81–64 | 95–62 | 101–79 | 96–71 | — | 87–67 | 71–75 | 91–60 |
| SZTE-Szedeák | 71–86 | 75–89 | 74–85 | 82–87 | 92–94 | 70–80 | 57–75 | 73–65 | 80–69 | 78–77 | 69–67 | — | 71–83 | 77–89 |
| NHSZ-Szolnoki Olajbányász | 96–87 | 97–90 | 80–67 | 77–99 | 101–95 | 75–69 | 83–72 | 91–92 | 78–71 | 91–80 | 75–70 | 94–77 | — | 66–76 |
| Zalakerámia ZTE KK | 95–91 | 86–90 | 103–84 | 68–91 | 99–80 | 70–67 | 104–85 | 99–75 | 90–78 | 101–72 | 108–85 | 103–70 | 86–83 | — |

Updated to match(es) played on unknown. Source: Hungarian Basketball Federation
Legend: Blue = home team win; Red = away team win.
Matches with lighter background shading were decided after overtime.

== Playoffs ==
All three rounds of the playoffs (exception the Third place game) were played in a best-of-five format, with the higher seeded team playing the first, third and fifth game at home (if it was necessary).

=== Bracket ===
Quarter-finals
1 | Falco-Vulcano Energia KC Szombathely | 3
8 | Arconic-Alba Fehérvár | 1
4 | DEAC | 1
5 | Zalakerámia ZTE KK | 3
2 | Atomerőmű SE | 3
7 | Sopron KC | 1
3 | NHSZ-Szolnoki Olajbányász | 3
6 | Egis Körmend | 0

Semi-finals
1 | Falco-Vulcano Energia KC Szombathely | 3
5 | Zalakerámia ZTE KK | 0
2 | Atomerőmű SE | 1
3 | NHSZ-Szolnoki Olajbányász | 3

Finals
1 | Falco-Vulcano Energia KC Szombathely | 0
3 | NHSZ-Szolnoki Olajbányász | 3
Third place
2 | Atomerőmű SE | 3
5 | Zalakerámia ZTE KK | 1

=== Quarter-finals ===
| Team 1 | Series | Team 2 | Game 1 | Game 2 | Game 3 | Game 4 | Game 5 |
|---|---|---|---|---|---|---|---|
| Falco-Vulcano Energia KC Szombathely | 3–1 | Arconic-Alba Fehérvár | 101–76 | 112–120 | 110–74 | 102–95 | — |
| DEAC | 1–3 | Zalakerámia ZTE KK | 54–82 | 86–91 | 78–77 | 72–80 | — |
| Atomerőmű SE | 3–1 | Sopron KC | 94–66 | 73–78 | 74–64 | 87–85 | — |
| NHSZ-Szolnoki Olajbányász | 3–0 | Egis Körmend | 93–78 | 86–73 | 116–77 | — | — |

=== Semi-finals ===
| Team 1 | Series | Team 2 | Game 1 | Game 2 | Game 3 | Game 4 | Game 5 |
|---|---|---|---|---|---|---|---|
| Falco-Vulcano Energia KC Szombathely | 3–0 | Zalakerámia ZTE KK | 94–62 | 97–77 | 85–64 | — | — |
| Atomerőmű SE | 1–3 | NHSZ-Szolnoki Olajbányász | 88–96 | 91–94 | 100–82 | 86–90 | — |

=== Third place ===
| Team 1 | Series | Team 2 | Game 1 | Game 2 | Game 3 | Game 4 | Game 5 |
|---|---|---|---|---|---|---|---|
| Atomerőmű SE | 3–1 | Zalakerámia ZTE KK | 94–73 | 73–79 (OT) | 82–66 | 89–79 | — |

=== Finals ===
| Team 1 | Series | Team 2 | Game 1 | Game 2 | Game 3 | Game 4 | Game 5 |
|---|---|---|---|---|---|---|---|
| Falco-Vulcano Energia KC Szombathely | 0–3 | NHSZ-Szolnoki Olajbányász | 73–93 | 79–81 | 79–98 | — | — |

==== Game 1 ====
| 17 May 2025 | Falco-Vulcano Energia KC Szombathely (1) | 73–93 (Series: 0–1) | NHSZ-Szolnoki Olajbányász (3) | Szombathely |
| 17:30 CEST | Scoring by quarter: 22–22, 13–25, 18–25, 20–21 |
| | Pts: Váradi 18; Rebs: Popović 13; Asts: Pongó 8 PIR: Keller 23 | Boxscore | Pts: Lukács 19; Rebs: Somogyi, Aimaq 6 Asts: Jovanović 9 PIR: Jovanović, Lukács 24 | Arena: Arena Savaria; Attendance: 3,070; Referees: Benczur, Montgomery-Tóth, Goda |

==== Game 2 ====
| 20 May 2025 | NHSZ-Szolnoki Olajbányász (3) | 81–79 (Series: 2–0) | Falco-Vulcano Energia KC Szombathely (1) | Szolnok |
| 18:00 CEST | Scoring by quarter: 21–9, 21–27, 13–18, 26–15 |
| | Pts: Jovanović 20; Rebs: Aimaq, Subotić 9 Asts: Jovanović 8 PIR: Subotić 27 | Boxscore | Pts: Pongó 15; Rebs: Bognár, Popović 8 Asts: Váradi 7 PIR: Keller 20 | Arena: Tiszaligeti Sportcsarnok; Attendance: 2,200; Referees: Praksch, Cziffra, Makrai |

==== Game 3 ====
| 23 May 2025 | Falco-Vulcano Energia KC Szombathely (1) | 79–98 (Series: 0–3) | NHSZ-Szolnoki Olajbányász (3) | Szombathely |
| 18:05 CEST | Scoring by quarter: 18–23, 24–27, 18–30, 19–18 |
| | Pts: Popović 13; Rebs: Keller 9 Asts: Pongó 4 PIR: Keller 21 | Boxscore | Pts: Somogyi 25; Rebs: Aimaq 13; Asts: Jovanović 8 PIR: Somogyi 30 | Arena: Arena Savaria; Attendance: 3,070; Referees: Földházi, Mészáros Dr., Nagy |

=== Final standings ===
| Pos. | Team | Qualification |
|---|---|---|
| 1st | NHSZ-Szolnoki Olajbányász (9th title) | 2025–26 Basketball Champions League – Regular season |
| 2nd | Falco-Vulcano Energia KC Szombathely | 2025–26 Basketball Champions League – Qualifying round |
| 3rd | Atomerőmű SE | 2025–26 FIBA Europe Cup – Qualifying round |
| 4th | Zalakerámia ZTE KK | |
| 5th | DEAC | |
| 6th | Egis Körmend | |
| 7th | Sopron KC | |
| 8th | Arconic-Alba Fehérvár | |

== 5-8th place ==
All two rounds of the playoff for the 5th place were played in a best-of-three format, with the higher seeded team playing the first and third game at home (if it was necessary).

=== Bracket ===
Semi-finals
4 | DEAC | 2
8 | Arconic-Alba Fehérvár | 0
6 | Egis Körmend | 2
7 | Sopron KC | 1

5th place
4 | DEAC | 2
6 | Egis Körmend | 0
7th place
7 | Sopron KC | 2
8 | Arconic-Alba Fehérvár | 1

=== Semi-finals ===
| Team 1 | Series | Team 2 | Game 1 | Game 2 | Game 3 |
|---|---|---|---|---|---|
| DEAC | 2–0 | Arconic-Alba Fehérvár | 97–84 | 102–98 (OT) | — |
| Egis Körmend | 2–1 | Sopron KC | 79–72 | 75–84 | 107–106 (OT) |

=== 7th place ===
| Team 1 | Series | Team 2 | Game 1 | Game 2 | Game 3 |
|---|---|---|---|---|---|
| Sopron KC | 2–1 | Arconic-Alba Fehérvár | 103–86 | 109–111 | 100–88 |

=== 5th place ===
| Team 1 | Series | Team 2 | Game 1 | Game 2 | Game 3 |
|---|---|---|---|---|---|
| DEAC | 2–0 | Egis Körmend | 106–78 | 97–76 | — |

== Playout ==
=== League table ===
| Pos | Team | Pld | W | L | PF | PA | PD | Pts | Qualification |
|---|---|---|---|---|---|---|---|---|---|
| 9 | NKA Universitas Pécs (Note: +6 adjust points (based on regular season standings)) | 10 | 7 | 3 | 820 | 731 | +89 | 23 | |
| 10 | Endo Plus Service-Honvéd (Note: +5 adjust points (based on regular season standings)) | 10 | 5 | 5 | 775 | 786 | −11 | 20 | |
| 11 | Duna Aszfalt-DTKH Kecskemét (Note: +4 adjust points (based on regular season standings)) | 10 | 5 | 5 | 778 | 810 | −32 | 19 | |
| 12 | SZTE-Szedeák (Note: +1 adjust points (based on regular season standings)) | 10 | 7 | 3 | 748 | 747 | +1 | 18 | |
| 13 | MVM-OSE Lions (Note: +3 adjust points (based on regular season standings)) | 10 | 4 | 6 | 805 | 813 | −8 | 17 | |
| 14 | PVSK-VEOLIA (Note: +2 adjust points (based on regular season standings)) (R) | 10 | 2 | 8 | 833 | 872 | −39 | 14 | ▼ Relegation to Nemzeti Bajnokság I/B |

Updated to match(es) played on 24 May 2025. Source: Hungarian Basketball Federation (in Hungarian), Flashscore
Rules for classification: 1) Games played; 2) Points; 3) Wins; 4) Defeats; 5) Points scored; 6) Points against; 7) Victories/Defeats series; 8) in Home games; 9) as a Guest; 10) Last 5 matches.
(R) Relegated

=== Results ===
In the table below the home teams are listed on the left and the away teams along the top.

| Home \ Away | NKA | HON | KEC | OSE | PVS | SZE |
|---|---|---|---|---|---|---|
| NKA Universitas Pécs | — | 84–72 | 90–51 | 89–74 | 90–80 | 78–52 |
| Endo Plus Service-Honvéd | 83–77 | — | 72–71 | 77–73 | 78–76 | 80–84 |
| Duna Aszfalt-DTKH Kecskemét | 83–91 | 83–79 | — | 94–92 | 99–82 | 76–67 |
| MVM-OSE Lions | 85–75 | 82–72 | 86–68 | — | 87–88 | 70–81 |
| PVSK-VEOLIA | 86–98 | 72–79 | 83–89 | 85–89 | — | 108–84 |
| SZTE-Szedeák | 65–48 | 84–83 | 68–64 | 84–67 | 79–73 | — |

Updated to match(es) played on 24 May 2025. Source: Hungarian Basketball Federation
Legend: Blue = home team win; Red = away team win.
Matches with lighter background shading were decided after overtime.

== Statistics ==
=== Regular season ===
As of match played 12 April 2025

=== Points ===
| Pos | Player | Club | PPG |
|---|---|---|---|
| 1 | (United States) Daylen Kountz | Körmend | 22.04 |
| 2 | (Canada) Reaudale Williams | Körmend | 21.54 |
| 3 | (United States) Amorie Archibald | PVSK | 21.43 |
| 4 | (United States) John Chandler III | Atomerőmű | 21.32 |
| 5 | (Hungary) Zoltán Perl | Falco | 20.52 |
| 6 | (United States) William Garrett | ZTE | 20.00 |
| 7 | (United States) Duane Wilson | OSE Lions | 19.00 |
| 8 | (United States) Jay Heath Jr | SZTE-Szedeák | 19.00 |

=== Efficiency ===
| Pos | Player | Club | PIR |
|---|---|---|---|
| 1 | (Canada) Reaudale Williams | Körmend | 32.19 |
| 2 | (United States) Amorie Archibald | PVSK | 31.05 |
| 3 | (Hungary) Zoltán Perl | Falco | 27.40 |
| 4 | (United States) Noah Dickerson | OSE Lions | 26.75 |
| 5 | (United States) John Chandler III | Atomerőmű | 24.80 |
| 6 | (United States) Daylen Kountz | Körmend | 24.54 |
| 7 | (Bosnia and Herzegovina) Ibrahim Durmo | NKA Universitas Pécs | 24.24 |
| 8 | (United States) Chris Payton Jr | PVSK | 22.60 |

=== Rebounds ===
| Pos | Player | Club | RPG |
|---|---|---|---|
| 1 | (Canada) Fardaws Aimaq | Szolnoki Olajbányász | 10.75 |
| 2 | (United States) Noah Dickerson | OSE Lions | 10.71 |
| 3 | (United States) Chris Payton Jr | PVSK | 9.00 |
| 4 | (Bosnia and Herzegovina) Ibrahim Durmo | NKA Universitas Pécs | 8.67 |
| 5 | (Serbia) Danilo Ostojić | DEAC | 7.78 |
| 6 | (United States) Alan Herndon | SZTE-Szedeák | 7.73 |
| 7 | (Hungary) János Eilingsfeld | Atomerőmű | 7.62 |
| 8 | (United States) Chris Payton Jr | DEAC | 7.28 |

=== Assists ===
| Pos | Player | Club | APG |
|---|---|---|---|
| 1 | (United States) Lester Medford Jr | Alba Fehérvár | 7.53 |
| 2 | (Hungary) Benedek Váradi | Falco | 6.23 |
| 3 | (United States) Amorie Archibald | PVSK | 5.67 |
| 4 | (Canada) Reaudale Williams | Körmend | 5.58 |
| 5 | (North Macedonia) Aleksandar Sokolović | Budapesti Honvéd | 5.54 |
| 6 | (Serbia) Strahinja Jovanović | Szolnoki Olajbányász | 5.28 |
| 7 | (United States) Cortez Edwards | Sopron | 5.15 |
| 8 | (United States) Kaelin Jackson | Sopron | 4.85 |

=== Play-off ===
As of match played 26 May 2025

=== Points ===
| Pos | Player | Club | PPG |
|---|---|---|---|
| 1 | (United States) Kaelin Jackson | Sopron | 22.30 |
| 2 | (Hungary) Dávid Vojvoda | Alba Fehérvár | 21.89 |
| 3 | (United States) Daylen Kountz | Körmend | 19.75 |
| 4 | (United States) Lester Medford Jr | Alba Fehérvár | 19.33 |
| 5 | (United States) Eric Lockett | Atomerőmű | 18.00 |
| 6 | (United States) John Chandler III | Atomerőmű | 17.83 |
| 7 | (Hungary) Markó Filipovity | Alba Fehérvár | 16.78 |
| 8 | (United States) Robert McGowens III | Zalakerámia ZTE KK | 16.64 |

=== Efficiency ===
| Pos | Player | Club | PIR |
|---|---|---|---|
| 1 | (United States) Kaelin Jackson | Sopron KC | 25.50 |
| 2 | (United States) Eric Lockett | Atomerőmű | 24.75 |
| 3 | (Canada) Fardaws Aimaq | Szolnoki Olajbányász | 24.00 |
| 4 | (United States) Daylen Kountz | Körmend | 23.75 |
| 5 | (Hungary) Dávid Vojvoda | Alba Fehérvár | 21.67 |
| 6 | (United States) Lester Medford Jr | Alba Fehérvár | 21.45 |
| 7 | (Hungary) János Eilingsfeld | Atomerőmű | 21.33 |
| 8 | (Serbia) Strahinja Jovanović | Szolnoki Olajbányász | 21.20 |

=== Rebounds ===
| Pos | Player | Club | RPG |
|---|---|---|---|
| 1 | (Canada) Fardaws Aimaq | Szolnoki Olajbányász | 10.40 |
| 2 | (Hungary) János Eilingsfeld | Atomerőmű | 7.58 |
| 3 | (Serbia) Danilo Ostojić | DEAC | 7.50 |
| 4 | (United States) De'Quon Lake | Atomerőmű | 7.50 |
| 5 | (United States) Isaiah Bigelow | Zalakerámia ZTE KK | 6.91 |
| 6 | (Serbia) Nikola Popović | Falco | 6.90 |
| 7 | (Hungary) Markó Filipovity | Alba Fehérvár | 6.67 |
| 8 | (Hungary) Kristóf Bognár | Falco | 6.20 |

=== Assists ===
| Pos | Player | Club | APG |
|---|---|---|---|
| 1 | (Hungary) Ádám Somogyi | Szolnoki Olajbányász | 5.90 |
| 2 | (United States) Lester Medford Jr | Alba Fehérvár | 5.67 |
| 3 | (Serbia) Strahinja Jovanović | Szolnoki Olajbányász | 5.60 |
| 4 | (Hungary) Benedek Váradi | Falco | 5.40 |
| 5 | (Hungary) Marcell Pongó | Falco | 5.10 |
| 6 | (Hungary) Máté Pongó | DEAC | 4.63 |
| 7 | (United States) Kaelin Jackson | Sopron | 4.60 |
| 8 | (Hungary) Zoltán Perl | Falco | 4.20 |

== Nemzeti Bajnokság I/A clubs in European competitions ==
FIBA competitions
| Team | Competition | Progress | W–L |
|---|---|---|---|
| Falco Szombathely | Champions League | Round of 16 | 5–10 |
| NHSZ-Szolnoki Olajbányász | FIBA Europe Cup | Regular Season | 0–6 |
| Arconic-Alba Fehérvár | FIBA Europe Cup | Regular Season | 4–4 |

== See also ==
- 2025 Magyar Kupa
- 2024–25 DEAC season
