= 2025 Magyar Kupa (men's basketball) =

67th season of the Hungarian Basketball Cup

2025 Zsíros Tibor Magyar Kupa
Tournament details
- Country: Hungary
- City: Kaposvár
- Venue: Kaposvár Aréna
- Dates: 18 January–9 March; Final four: 8–9 March
- Teams: 8
- Defending champions: NHSZ-Szolnoki Olajbányász

Final positions
- Champions: Falco-Vulcano Energia KC Szombathely (3rd title)
- Runners-up: Egis Körmend
- Semifinalists: Atomerőmű (Paks); DEAC (Debrecen)

The 2025 Tibor Zsíros Férfi Magyar Kupa will the 67th season of the Hungarian Basketball Cup.

== Qualification ==
Eight highest ranked teams after the first half of the 2024–25 NB I/A regular season qualified to the tournament.

1. Falco-Vulcano Energia KC Szombathely — Szombathely
2. Atomerőmű SE — Paks
3. NHSZ-Szolnoki Olajbányász — Szolnok
4. Alba Fehérvár — Székesfehérvár
5. Debreceni EAC — Debrecen
6. Egis Körmend — Körmend
7. Zalakerámia ZTE KK — Zalaegerszeg
8. NKA Universitas Pécs — Pécs

== Bracket ==
Quarterfinals; 18 January 2025
Egis Körmend	89
Zalakerámia ZTE KK (Zalaegerszeg)	86
DEAC (Debrecen) (OT)	86 (74)
NKA Universitas (Pécs)	81 (74)
Falco (Szombathely)	85
Szolnoki Olajbányász	76
Atomerőmű (Paks)	115
Alba Fehérvár (Székesfehérvár)	72

Semi-finals; 8 March 2025
Egis Körmend	82
DEAC (Debrecen)	73
Falco (Szombathely)	81
Atomerőmű (Paks)	63

Final; 9 March 2025
Falco (Szombathely)	101
Egis Körmend	76
Third place
Atomerőmű (Paks) (OT)	89 (76)
DEAC (Debrecen)	87 (76)

== Quarterfinals ==
The draw for the Quarterfinals was held on 23 December 2024.

16 January 2025 QF	Egis Körmend	89–86	Zalakerámia ZTE KK	Körmend
18:00 (CET)	Scoring by quarter: 20–14, 29–30, 22–27, 18–15
	Pts: Kountz 34; Rebs: Kountz, Pipiras 7 Asts: Williams 7 PIR: Kountz 38	Boxscore	Pts: Bigelow 24; Rebs: Bigelow 10; Asts: Mcgowens III 7 PIR: Bigelow 37	Arena: Városi Sportcsarnok; Referees: Mészáros, Frányó, Söjtöry

18 January 2025 QF	Debreceni EAC	86–81(OT)	NKA Universitas Pécs	Debrecen
18:00 (CET)	Scoring by quarter: 18–16, 19–27, 21–14, 16–17, Overtime: 12–7
	Pts: Drenovac 19; Rebs: Ostojić 11; Asts: Anderson 6 PIR: Ostojić 34	Boxscore	Pts: Durmo 28; Rebs: Durmo 15; Asts: Nikolić 7 PIR: Durmo 45	Arena: Oláh Gábor Sports Hall; Attendance: 1,250; Referees: Földházi, Cziffra, Makrai

18 January 2025 QF	Falco (Szombathely)	85–76	Szolnoki Olajbányász	Szombathely
18:00 (CET)	Scoring by quarter: 27–24, 16–15, 26–14, 16–23
	Pts: Perl 19; Rebs: Bognár 8 Asts: Pongó 8 PIR: Perl 32	Boxscore	Pts: Subotić 24; Rebs: Aimaq 16; Asts: Subotić 4 PIR: Aimaq 34	Arena: Arena Savaria; Attendance: 2,920; Referees: Benczur, Montgomery-Tóth, Györfy

18 January 2025 QF	Atomerőmű (Paks)	115–72	Alba Fehérvár	Paks
18:00 (CET)	Scoring by quarter: 38–25, 24–19, 24–17, 29–11
	Pts: Chandler III 32; Rebs: Lake 10; Asts: Eilingsfeld 6 PIR: Chandler III 40	Boxscore	Pts: Medford Jr. 20; Rebs: Krivacevic 6 Asts: Medford Jr. 6 PIR: Medford Jr. 23	Arena: ASE Sports Hall; Attendance: 1,100; Referees: Praksch, Kapitány, V. Nagy

== Final Four ==
=== Semi-finals ===
8 March 2025 SF	Falco (Szombathely)	81–63	Atomerőmű (Paks)	Kaposvár
17:00	Scoring by quarter: 13–18, 26–16, 30–17, 12–12
	Pts: Perl 35	Boxscore	Pts: Benke 12	Arena: Kaposvár Aréna; Attendance: 2,000; Referees: Benczur, Mészáros, Söjtöry
Note:

8 March 2025 SF	Egis Körmend	82–73	DEAC (Debrecen)	Kaposvár
20:00	Scoring by quarter: 21–22, 22–16, 18–16, 21–19
	Pts: Williams 25	Boxscore	Pts: Drenovac 19	Arena: Kaposvár Aréna; Attendance: 2,200; Referees: Kapitány, Goda, Fodor

=== Bronze medal match ===
9 March 2025 BM	Atomerőmű (Paks)	89–87(OT)	DEAC (Debrecen)	Kaposvár
17:00	Scoring by quarter: 23–30, 20–12, 15–19, 18–15, Overtime: 13–11
	Pts: Chandler III 27	Boxscore	Pts: Drenovac 23	Arena: Kaposvár Aréna; Attendance: 1,000; Referees: V. Nagy, Makrai, Nyilas

=== Final ===
9 March 2025 F	Falco (Szombathely)	101–76	Egis Körmend	Kaposvár
20:15	Scoring by quarter: 23–19, 29–27, 27–17, 22–13
	Pts: Perl 23; Rebs: Keller 7 Asts: Pongó 10; PIR: Popović 34	Boxscore	Pts: Durázi 23; Rebs: Kountz, Vučković 5 Asts: Williams 7 PIR: Kountz 28	Arena: Kaposvár Aréna; Attendance: 2,500; Referees: Földházi, Cziffra, Praksch
Note: FALCO: Pongó 8/6, Novaković 12/6, Clark 12/6, Bognár 3/3, Popović 22 • Substitutions: Keller 7, Perl 23/6, Diggs 7/3, B. Kovács 7/3, Sövegjártó, Verasztó • Coach: Milos Konakov

2025 Magyar Kupa Winners
Falco-Vulcano Energia KC Szombathely
(3rd title)

== Statistics ==
As of match played 18 January 2025

Source: Magyar Kosárlabda Szövetség

Top5 Points
Rank	Points	Player	Club
1	34	Daylen Kountz	Egis Körmend
2	32	John Chandler	Atomerőmű
3	28	Ibrahim Durmo	NKA Universitas Pécs
4	24	János Eilingsfeld	Atomerőmű
4	24	Bojan Subotić	Szolnoki Olajbányász
4	24	Isaiah Bigelow	Zalakerámia ZTE KK

Top5 PIR
Rank	PIR	Player	Club
1	45	Ibrahim Durmo	NKA Universitas Pécs
2	40	John Chandler	Atomerőmű
3	38	Daylen Kountz	Egis Körmend
4	37	Isaiah Bigelow	Zalakerámia ZTE KK
5	36	János Eilingsfeld	Atomerőmű

Top5 Rebound
Rank	Rebound	Player	Club
1	16	Fardaws Aimaq	Szolnoki Olajbányász
2	15	Ibrahim Durmo	NKA Universitas Pécs
3	11	Danilo Ostojić	DEAC
4	10	De'Quon Lake	Atomerőmű SE
4	10	Isaiah Bigelow	Zalakerámia ZTE KK

Top5 Assist
Rank	Assist	Player	Club
1	8	Marcell Pongó	Falco-Vulcano Energia KC Szombathely
2	7	Robert McGowens	Zalakerámia ZTE KK
2	7	Nikolić Nemanja	NKA Universitas Pécs
2	7	Reaudale Williams	Egis Körmend
5	6	Lester Medford	Alba Fehérvár
5	6	János Eilingsfeld	Atomerőmű
5	6	Kyan Anderson	DEAC

== See also ==
- 2024–25 Nemzeti Bajnokság I/A
