= 2024 Magyar Kupa (men's basketball) =

66th season of the Hungarian Basketball Cup

2024 Zsíros Tibor Magyar Kupa
Tournament details
- Country: Hungary
- City: Budapest
- Venue(s): BOK Hall
- Dates: 24 January–7 April 2024; 6–7 April 2024 (Final four)
- Teams: 8
- Defending champions: Falco-Vulcano Energia KC Szombathely

Final positions
- Champions: NHSZ-Szolnoki Olajbányász (10th title)
- Runner-up: SZTE-Szedeák
- Semifinalists: Falco-Vulcano Energia KC Szombathely; NKA Universitas Pécs

The 2024 Tibor Zsíros Férfi Magyar Kupa was the 66th season of the Hungarian Basketball Cup.

== Qualification ==
Eight highest ranked teams after the first half of the 2023–24 NB I/A regular season qualified to the tournament.

1. Falco-Vulcano Energia KC Szombathely
2. Arconic-Alba Fehérvár
3. NHSZ-Szolnoki Olajbányász
4. Debreceni EAC
5. SZTE-Szedeák
6. Zalakerámia ZTE KK
7. Egis Körmend
8. NKA Universitas Pécs

== Bracket ==
Quarterfinals; 24 January 2024
Falco Szombathely	95
Arconic-Alba Fehérvár	73
Egis Körmend	91
SZTE-Szedeák	98
Zalakerámia ZTE KK	75
NKA Universitas Pécs	78
NHSZ-Szolnoki Olajbányász	85
Debreceni EAC	78

Semifinals; 6 April 2024
Falco Szombathely	87
SZTE-Szedeák	96
NKA Universitas Pécs	70
NHSZ-Szolnoki Olajbányász	87

Final; 7 April 2024
SZTE-Szedeák	80
Szolnoki Olajbányász	96
Third place
Falco Szombathely	101
NKA Universitas Pécs	81

== Quarterfinals ==
24 January 2024	Falco-Vulcano Energia KC Szombathely	95–73	Arconic-Alba Fehérvár	Szombathely
18:00 (CET)	Scoring by quarter: 21-19, 33-21, 25-16, 16-17
	Pts: Perl 22	Report	Pts: Barnett 18	Arena: Arena Savaria; Attendance: 3,040; Referees: Tamás Benczur, Rúben Györfy, Gábor Farkas

24 January 2024	Egis Körmend	91–98	SZTE-Szedeák	Körmend
18:00 (CET)	Scoring by quarter: 31–16, 19–28, 17–23, 24–31
	Pts: Tolbert 30	Report	Pts: Locke 29	Arena: Körmend Városi Sportcsarnok; Attendance: 1,800; Referees: Csaba Cziffra, Gellért Kapitány, László Minár

24 January 2024	Zalakerámia ZTE KK	75–78	NKA Universitas Pécs	Zalaegerszeg
18:00 (CET)	Scoring by quarter: 20—21, 21—15, 15—16, 19—26
	Pts: Hicks 19	Report	Pts: Walker 28	Arena: Zalaegerszeg Városi Sportcsarnok; Attendance: 930; Referees: Balázs Mészáros, László Goda, Tamás Söjtöry

24 January 2024	Szolnoki Olajbányász	85–78	Debreceni EAC	Szolnok
18:00 (CET)	Scoring by quarter: 20–18, 16–23, 23–17, 26–20
	Pts: Eads III 23; Rebs: four players 5 Asts: Pongó 7 PIR: Eads III 29	Report	Pts: Edwin 26; Rebs: Williamson 7 Asts: Edwin 8 PIR: Edwin 45	Arena: Tiszaligeti Sportcsarnok; Attendance: 1,500; Referees: Tamás Földházi, Viktor Nagy, Péter Frányó

== Semifinals ==
6 April 2024	Falco-Vulcano Energia KC Szombathely	87–96	SZTE-Szedeák	Budapest
17:00 (CET)	Scoring by quarter: 23–18, 19–27, 25–20, 20–31
	Pts: Perl 24; Rebs: Tiby 12; Asts: Tiby 5 PIR: Tiby 29	Boxscore	Pts: Locke 32; Rebs: Lake 10; Asts: Wooldrige, Mucza 4 PIR: Locke 35	Arena: Bok Sportcsarnok; Attendance: 1,200; Referees: Gellért Kapitány, László Goda, Attila Fodor

6 April 2024	NKA Universitas Pécs	70–87	NHSZ-Szolnoki Olajbányász	Budapest
20:00 (CET)	Scoring by quarter: 18–30, 16–18, 23–13, 13–26
	Pts: Durmo 20; Rebs: Durmo 11; Asts: Nikolic 5 PIR: Durmo 31	Boxscore	Pts: three players 12; Rebs: Wiggins 9 Asts: Jovanović 9 PIR: Jovanović 19	Arena: Bok Sportcsarnok; Attendance: 1,000; Referees: Csaba Cziffra, Viktor Nagy, Tamás Söjtöry

== Final ==
7 April 2024	NKA Universitas Pécs	80–96	NHSZ-Szolnoki Olajbányász	Budapest
20:00 (CET)	Scoring by quarter: 27–23, 20–20, 15–33, 18–20
	Pts: Wooldrige 18; Rebs: Lake 8 Asts: Wooldrige 8 PIR: Wooldrige 27	Boxscore	Pts: Wiggins 18; Rebs: Thomas 9 Asts: Jovanović 8 PIR: Wiggins 32	Arena: Bok Sportcsarnok; Attendance: 2,500; Referees: Tamás Földházi, Tamás Benczur, Gábor Farkas

2024 Magyar Kupa Winners
NHSZ-Szolnoki Olajbányász
(10th title)

== See also ==
- 2023–24 Nemzeti Bajnokság I/A
