= Kyan Anderson =

American basketball player (born 1992)

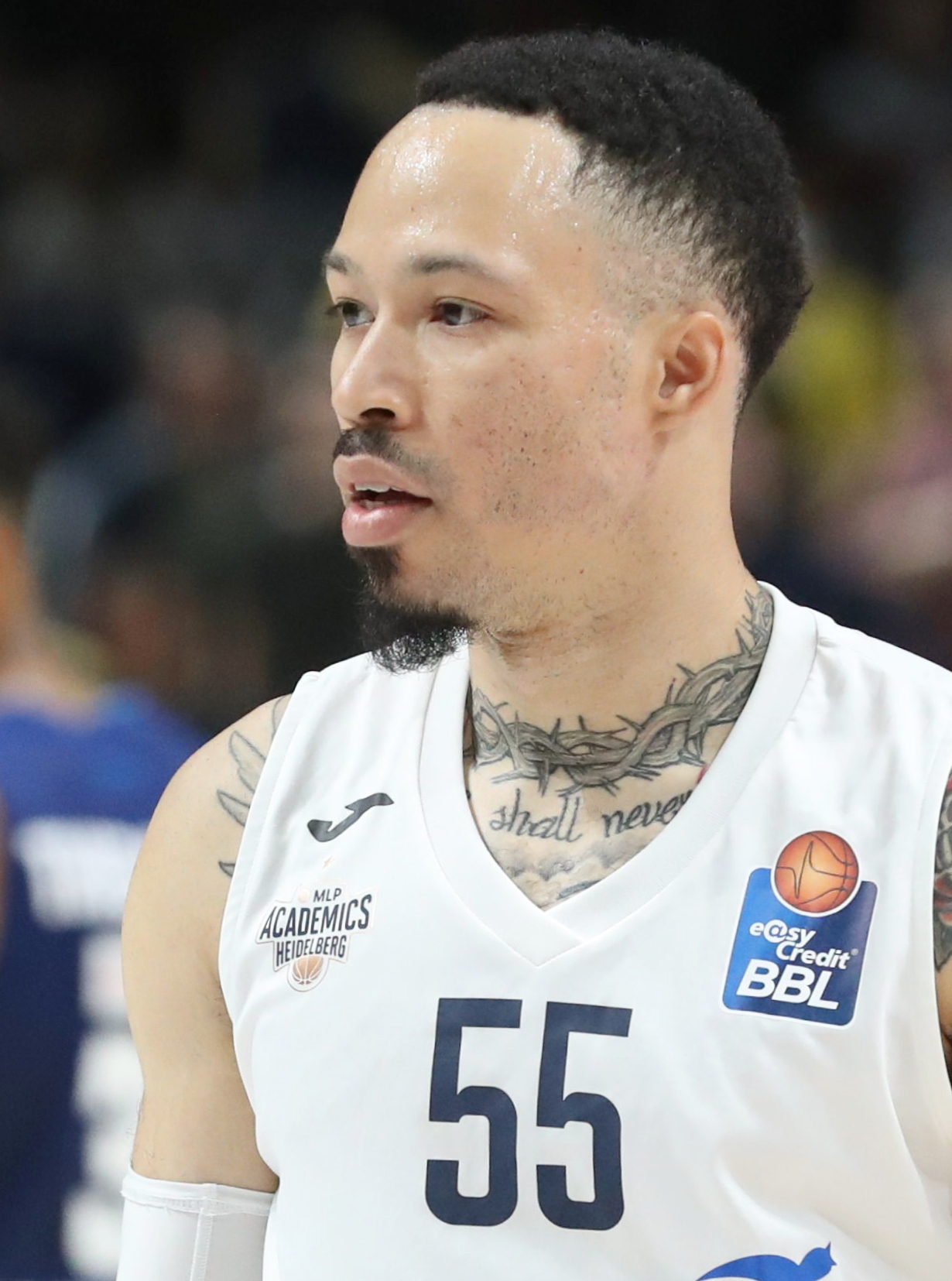

No. 5 – Peja
- Position: Point guard
- League: Kosovo Basketball Superleague

Personal information
- Born: March 25, 1992 (age 34) Fort Worth, Texas, U.S.
- Listed height: 5 ft 11 in (1.80 m)
- Listed weight: 176 lb (80 kg)

Career information
- High school: North Crowley (Fort Worth, Texas)
- College: TCU (2011–2015)
- NBA draft: 2015: undrafted
- Playing career: 2015–present

Career history
- 2015–2016: Okapi Aalstar
- 2016–2017: medi Bayreuth
- 2017–2018: Élan Béarnais Pau-Lacq-Orthez
- 2018–2019: Prishtina
- 2019: medi Bayreuth
- 2019–2020: BG Göttingen
- 2020–2021: Falco KC
- 2021–2022: Gießen 46ers
- 2022: MLP Academics Heidelberg
- 2022–2023: Alliance Sport Alsace
- 2023: Labas GAS Prienai
- 2023-2024: MKE Ankaragücü
- 2024–2025: Debreceni EAC
- 2025–2026: Bashkimi
- 2026–present: Peja

Career highlights
- Kosovo League champion (2019); Kosovo Cup champion (2019); Kosovo Supercup champion (2019); Hungarian Cup winner (2021); Hungarian League champion (2021)

Kyan Anderson (born March 25, 1992) is an American professional basketball player for Peja of the Kosovo Basketball Superleague. He played college basketball for the TCU Horned Frogs.

== College career ==
Anderson averaged 17.0 points and 4.5 assists per game as a junior at TCU. As a senior, he averaged 13.4 points per game and finished seventh all-time in TCU scoring.

== Professional career ==
In the 2015–16 season, Anderson played for Okapi Aalstar of the Belgian league. He led the team in scoring with 15.9 points per game. The following season, he signed with medi Bayreuth. He posted 12 points, 1.7 rebounds and 3.6 assists per contest. In July 2017, Anderson signed with Élan Béarnais Pau-Lacq-Orthez. He left the team in January 2018 after averaging 9.3 points and 4.4 assists per game.

On August 19, 2018, Anderson signed with Sigal Prishtina of the Kosovan league.

On July 31, 2019, he signed with BG Göttingen of the Basketball Bundesliga.

On June 16, 2020, he has signed with Falco KC of the Hungarian Basketball League.

On August 2, 2021, he has signed with Gießen 46ers of the Basketball Bundesliga.

On February 22, 2022, he has signed with MLP Academics Heidelberg of the Basketball Bundesliga.

On July 8, 2022, he signed with Alliance Sport Alsace of the French LNB Pro B.
