= Debreceni EAC =

Debreceni EAC may refer to:

- Debreceni EAC (basketball), the basketball section of the Hungarian multi-sports club
- Debreceni EAC (football), the football section of the Hungarian multi-sports club
- Debreceni EAC (men's handball), the men's handball section of the Hungarian multi-sports club
