= Krisztofer Durázi =

Hungarian basketball player

No. 7 – Egis Körmend
- Position: Small forward
- League: NB I/A

Personal information
- Born: 13 October 1998 (age 28) Szombathely, Hungary
- Listed height: 201 cm (6 ft 7 in)
- Listed weight: 82 kg (181 lb)

Career information
- Playing career: 2012–present

Career history
- 2012–2020: Falco Szombathely
- 2020-present: Egis Körmend

Krisztofer Durázi (born 13 October 1998) is a Hungarian professional basketball player, who currently plays for Egis Körmend. Durázi mainly plays as small forward.

== Professional career ==
On 6 December 2017, Durázi recorded 21 points and 19 rebounds in his first European game, in a 104–43 win over Karpoš Sokoli in the FIBA Europe Cup.
