= Eric Lockett =

American basketball player (born 1995)

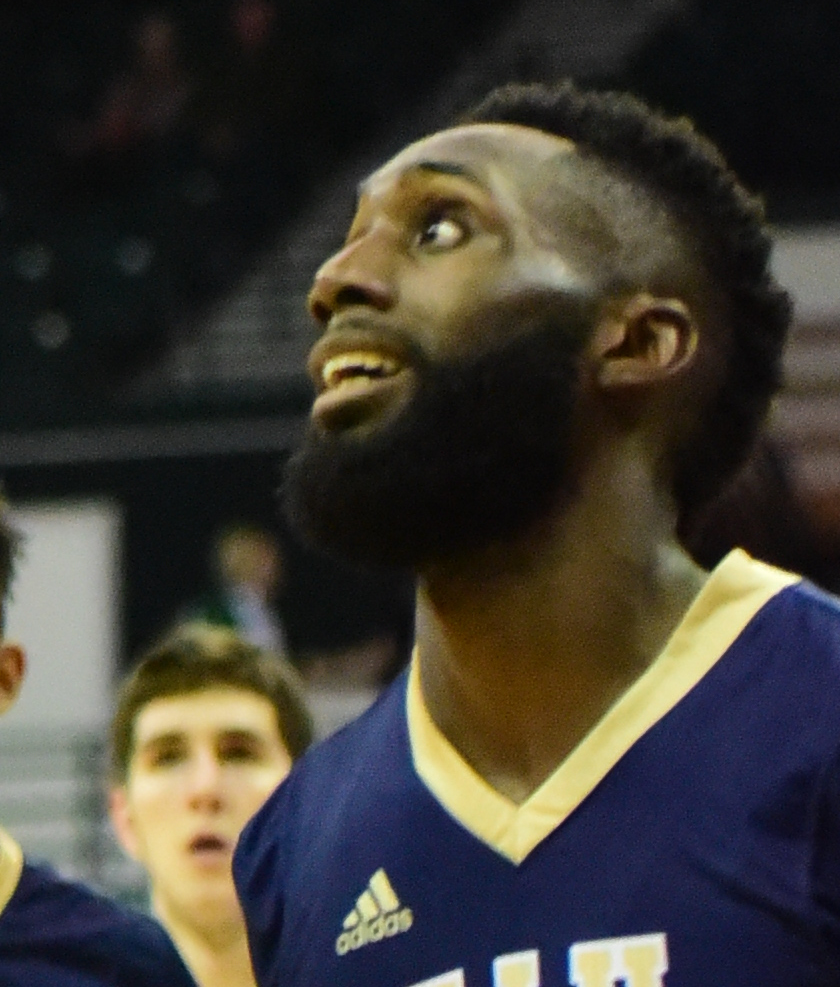
- Lockett in action with FIU

Free Agent
- Position: Small forward

Personal information
- Born: December 25, 1995 (age 30) Atlanta, Georgia
- Listed height: 6 ft 5 in (1.96 m)
- Listed weight: 202 lb (92 kg)

Career information
- High school: Whitefield Academy (Marietta, Georgia)
- College: George Mason (2014–2015); Chipola (2015–2016); FIU (2016–2018); NC State (2018–2019)
- NBA draft: 2019: undrafted
- Playing career: 2019–present

Career history
- 2019–2020: Al-Rayyan
- 2020–2021: Bristol Flyers
- 2021–2022: Aris Thessaloniki
- 2022–2023: ERA Nymburk
- 2023–2024: Rostock Seawolves
- 2024–2025: Atomerőmű SE
- 2025–2026: Anwil Włocławek
- 2026: Trefl Sopot

Career highlights
- All-Greek League Defensive Team (2022)

Eric Lockett (born December 25, 1995) is an American professional basketball player who last played for Trefl Sopot of the Polish Basketball League (PLK). He played college basketball for George Mason, Chipola College, FIU, NC State from 2014 until 2019 and till March 2026 for Anwil Włocławek.

== High school career ==
Lockett attended Whitefield Academy at Marietta, Georgia. As a senior, Lockett averaged 18 points, 9 rebounds and 4 assists per game.

== College career ==
During his college career, Lockett attended George Mason, Chipola College, FIU and NC State from 2014 until 2019.

== Professional career ==
=== Al-Rayyan ===
After going undrafted at the 2019 NBA draft, Lockett joined Al-Rayyan in Qatar.

=== Bristol Flyers ===
In February 2020, Lockett joined Bristol Flyers of the BBL. He played for two seasons with the club and in his second season, he went on to average 15 points and 7 rebounds and 4.2 assists per game.

=== Aris ===
On August 23, 2021, Lockett joined ENAD in Cyprus. However, he never appeared in a single game with the club, as he was transferred to Aris of the Greek Basket League. In 26 games, he averaged 6.1 points, 4 rebounds, 1.4 assists and 0.9 steals, playing around 22 minutes per contest and submitting tons of defensive energy to the court resulting in All-Greek League Defensive Team.

=== Basketball Nymburk ===
On August 8, 2022, he has signed with ERA Nymburk of the National Basketball League.

=== Anwil Włocławek ===
On July 10, 2025, he signed with Anwil Włocławek of the Polish Basketball League (PLK).

=== Trefl Sopot ===
On March 25, 2026, he signed with Trefl Sopot of the Polish Basketball League (PLK).
