= Đorđe Drenovac =

Serbian basketball player

No. 13 – Szedeák
- Position: Small forward
- League: Nemzeti Bajnokság I/A

Personal information
- Born: August 9, 1992 (age 34) Belgrade, Serbia, FR Yugoslavia
- Listed height: 2.01 m (6 ft 7 in)
- Listed weight: 97 kg (214 lb)

Career information
- Playing career: 2007–present

Career history
- 2007–2008: Mega Vizura
- 2008–2012: Traiskirchen Lions
- 2012–2013: Fortitudo Bologna
- 2013–2014: Valladolid
- 2014–2015: Igokea
- 2015–2017: MZT Skopje
- 2017–2018: Mitteldeutscher
- 2018–2019: Mornar
- 2020–2025: DEAC
- 2025–present: SZTE-Szedeák

Career highlights
- Bosnian League champion (2015); 2× Macedonian League champion (2016, 2017); Bosnian Cup winner (2015); Macedonian Cup winner (2016)
Medals
Men's basketball
Representing Serbia
U19 World Championship
Silver medal – second place	2011 Latvia	U19 Team

Đorđe Drenovac (Serbian Cyrillic: Ђорђе Дреновац, born 9 August 1992) is a Serbian professional basketball player for SZTE-Szedeák of the Hungarian First League.

He played for Mega Vizura, Traiskirchen Lions, Fortitudo Bologna, Valladolid, Igokea, MZT Skopje, Mitteldeutscher BC.
