= Amorie Archibald =

American basketball player

Al-Ittihad Jeddah
- Position: Point guard / shooting guard
- League: Saudi Basketball League; WASL

Personal information
- Born: September 5, 1999 (age 27) Deltona, Florida, U.S.
- Listed height: 6 ft 3 in (1.91 m)
- Listed weight: 185 lb (84 kg)

Career information
- High school: Trinity Christian Academy (Deltona, Florida)
- College: Louisiana Tech (2017–2022)
- NBA draft: 2022: undrafted
- Playing career: 2022–present

Career history
- 2022–2023: Cheshire Phoenix
- 2023–2024: Sopron KC
- 2024–2025: PVSK Panthers
- 2025–2026: Pelita Jaya
- 2026–present: Al-Ittihad Jeddah

Career highlights
- IBL All-Star (2026)

Amorie Anthony Archibald (born September 5, 1999) nicknamed Pookie, is an American professional basketball player for Al-Ittihad Jeddah of the Saudi Basketball League and the FIBA West Asia Super League (WASL). He played college basketball for the Louisiana Tech Bulldogs.

== High school career ==
As a senior, Archibald led the program to their first-ever Florida 3A state championship, and averaged 23 points, five rebounds, four assists and two steals per game. He was a finalist for Florida Mr. Basketball in 2017.

== College career ==
On October 14, 2016, Archibald commits to Louisiana Tech University, but he's also keeping an open mind about suiting up for the Bulldogs on the gridiron as well. A dual-threat quarterback and former wide receiver, Archibald has thrown for 1,070 yards, rushed for 853 more and scored 20 total touchdowns in five games.

== Professional career ==
At December 20, 2025, Archibald replaces injured, Anthony Beane, joining Pelita Jaya of the Indonesian Basketball League (IBL). Played in Hungary last season, and averaged 21,4 PPG, 6,5 RPG, and 5,7 APG in 21 games played. On March 13, 2026, Archibald scored a triple-double against Pacific Caesar, scoring 22 points, 10 rebounds, and 13 assists, continuing Pelita Jaya's 13-0 run.
