= Duane Wilson =

American baseball player (1934–2021)

- Pitcher
- Born: June 29, 1934; Wichita, Kansas, U.S.
- Died: November 9, 2021 (aged 87); Wichita, Kansas, U.S.
- Batted: Left Threw: Left

MLB debut
- July 3, 1958, for the Boston Red Sox

Last MLB appearance
- July 12, 1958, for the Boston Red Sox

MLB statistics
- Win–loss record: 0–0
- Earned run average: 5.68
- Strikeouts: 3
- Stats at Baseball Reference

Teams
- Boston Red Sox (1958)

Duane Lewis Wilson (June 29, 1934 – November 9, 2021) was an American professional baseball player.

A pitcher, he appeared in two games in Major League Baseball for the Boston Red Sox during the 1958 season. Listed at 6 feet 1 inch (1.85 m), 185 pounds (84 kg), he batted and threw left-handed.

Wilson signed with the Red Sox in 1952 and was in his seventh season in the club's farm system when he was recalled on July 3, 1958. In two games, both starts, Wilson posted a 5.68 ERA in 6 1/3 innings pitched, giving up five runs (four earned) on 10 hits and seven walks while striking out three. He did not have a decision.

In his first start, on July 3 against the Baltimore Orioles, Wilson allowed only one unearned run in six full innings, although he surrendered eight hits and walked five. Baltimore won 7–5 in 15 innings.

However, in his second appearance nine days later, Wilson was treated roughly by the Chicago White Sox, getting only one out in the first inning of a 13–5 loss (charged to his successor on the Boston mound, Mike Fornieles) and surrendering four earned runs on two hits and two bases on balls.

Wilson then returned to minor league baseball for the remainder of his career. He left baseball after the 1959 season.

Wilson died in Wichita on November 9, 2021, at the age of 87.
