= Danilo Ostojić =

Serbian basketball player

No. 21 – DEAC
- Position: Power forward
- League: Hungarian League

Personal information
- Born: May 11, 1996 (age 30) Belgrade, FR Yugoslavia
- Listed height: 2.05 m (6 ft 9 in)
- Listed weight: 106 kg (234 lb)

Career information
- NBA draft: 2018: undrafted
- Playing career: 2014–present

Career history
- 2014–2016: Crvena zvezda
- 2014–2016: → FMP
- 2016–2017: Metalac
- 2017–2018: Vršac
- 2018–2020: Dynamic Belgrade
- 2020–2021: HydroTruck Radom
- 2021: Charilaos Trikoupis
- 2021–2022: HydroTruck Radom
- 2022–2023: ZTE KK
- 2024–present: DEAC

Career highlights
- Euroleague IJT champion (2014)
Medals
Men's basketball
Representing Serbia
U18 European Championship
Silver medal – second place	2014 Turkey	Team

Danilo Ostojić (Serbian Cyrillic: Данило Остојић, born 11 May 1996) is a Serbian professional basketball player for DEAC of the Hungarian League.

== Early career ==
Ostojić grew up with Crvena zvezda youth teams. He won 2014 Euroleague NIJT.

== Professional career ==
He signed his first professional contract for Crvena zvezda in May 2014. In August 2018, he signed for Dynamic Belgrade.

On April 2, 2021, Ostojić signed with Greek club Charilaos Trikoupis.

On May 25, 2021, he has signed with HydroTruck Radom of the PLK.
