= Debreceni EAC (basketball) =

Debreceni EAC (DEAC)
- 2024–25 Debreceni EAC (basketball) season
- Leagues: Nemzeti Bajnokság I/A
- Founded: 2012; 14 years ago (parent club in 1919)
- History: Debreceni EAC (2012–present)
- Arena: Oláh Gábor Sports Hall
- Capacity: 1,000
- Location: Debrecen, Hungary
- Team colors: Black, White
- President: István Becsky
- Head coach: Ákos Pethő
- Team captain: Bálint Mócsán
- Website: kosarlabda.deac.hu
Home	Away

Debreceni EAC, commonly known as DEAC, is a professional basketball club from Debrecen, Hungary. It is part of the multi-sports club, Debreceni EAC.

== History ==
The basketball section of Debreceni EAC was founded in 2012. The club plays its home games at the Oláh Gábor Sports Hall, which has a capacity of 1,000 people. They entered the top division Nemzeti Bajnokság I/A for the 2017–18 season. In DEAC's debut season, the team finished in 11th place.

In the 2018–19 season, DEAC reached the semi-finals of the Hungarian Cup for the first time in history.

== Current roster ==
Note: Flags indicate national team eligibility at FIBA-sanctioned events. Players may hold other non-FIBA nationalities not displayed.

Debreceni EAC roster
Players
Coaches

Pos.	No.	Nat.	Name	Ht.	Age
PF	0	(Hungary)	Fekete, Csongor	1.99 m (6 ft 6 in)	22 – 19 February 2004
C	2	(Hungary)	Csizmadia, Attila	2.05 m (6 ft 9 in)	23 – 29 November 2002
PF	5	(United States)	Buckles, Rakeem Jamal	2.05 m (6 ft 9 in)	35 – 15 November 1990
SG	7	(Hungary)	Neuwirth, Bence	1.92 m (6 ft 4 in)	23 – 5 April 2002
C	8	(Croatia)	Buljevic, Lovro	2.08 m (6 ft 10 in)	27 – 12 August 1998
PG	9	(Serbia)	Tadić, Tadija	1.94 m (6 ft 4 in)	26 – 22 April 1999
PG	10	(Hungary)	Kenéz, Csaba	1.92 m (6 ft 4 in)	23 – 4 September 2002
SF	13	(Serbia)	Drenovac, Đorđe	1.98 m (6 ft 6 in)	33 – 9 August 1992
PG	15	(United States)	Edwin, Deon Javern	1.95 m (6 ft 5 in)	33 – 9 October 1992
C	18	(Hungary)	Czermann, Patrik	2.10 m (6 ft 11 in)	23 – 23 February 2003
PF	20	(Hungary)	Garamvölgyi, Ákos	2.01 m (6 ft 7 in)	32 – 28 January 1994
SG	24	(Hungary)	Mócsán, Bálint (C)	1.92 m (6 ft 4 in)	28 – 18 June 1997
PG	27	(Hungary)	Ságodi, Róbert	1.82 m (6 ft 0 in)	21 – 22 May 2004
PF	28	(Hungary)	Hegedüs, Brúnó	2.00 m (6 ft 7 in)	21 – 18 June 2004
PF	50	(United States)	Williamson, Andre Marcell	2.02 m (6 ft 8 in)	36 – 13 October 1989
SG	56	(Hungary)	Várszegi, Ádám	1.95 m (6 ft 5 in)	21 – 16 July 2004
PG	88	(Hungary)	Hőgye, Patrik	1.93 m (6 ft 4 in)	20 – 12 April 2005

Head coach

- (Hungary) Ákos Pethő

Assistant coach(es)

- (Hungary) Barna Jávor

Legend

- (C) Team captain
- Injured

- Roster
Updated: 30 December 2023

== Season by season ==
Season	Domestic league			Domestic cup	European competitions	Team name	Season in detail
Season	Tier	League	Pos.	Domestic cup	European competitions	Team name	Season in detail
2012–13	2	NB I/B	17th			DEAC	
2013–14	2	NB I/B	4th	did not qualify		DEAC	
2014–15	2	NB I/B	1st^{1}	did not qualify		DEAC	
2015–16	2	NB I/B	3rd	did not qualify		DEAC	
2016–17	2	NB I/B	1st	did not qualify		DEAC	
2017–18	1	NB I/A	11th	did not qualify		DEAC	
2018–19	1	NB I/A	9th	Third place		DEAC	
2019–20	1	NB I/A	4th^{2}	Cancalled^{2}		DEAC	
2020–21	1	NB I/A	4th	Runner-up		DEAC	
2021–22	1	NB I/A	10th	Quarterfinalist		DEAC-Tungsram	
2022–23	1	NB I/A	6th	did not qualify		DEAC	
2023–24	1	NB I/A	8th	Quarterfinalist		DEAC	2023–24 season
2024–25	1	NB I/A	5th	4th		DEAC	2024–25 season

^1 Could not promote.
^2 Cancelled due to the COVID-19 pandemic in Hungary.
