= Noah Dickerson =

American basketball player

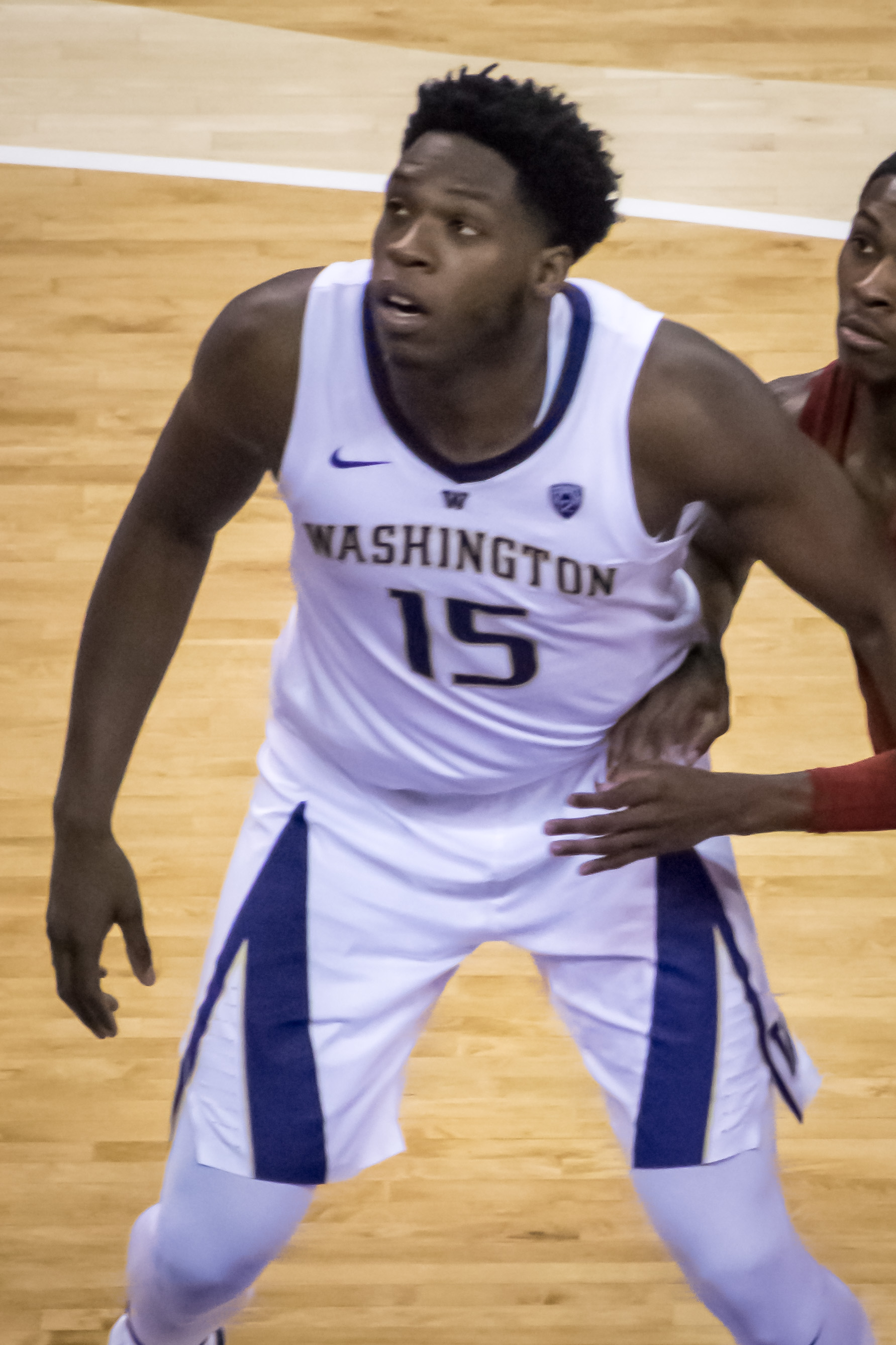
- Dickerson with Washington in January 2019

No. 15 – Anhui Wenyi
- Position: Power forward / center
- League: NBL

Personal information
- Born: February 1, 1997 (age 29)
- Listed height: 6 ft 8 in (2.03 m)
- Listed weight: 235 lb (107 kg)

Career information
- High school: North Atlanta (Atlanta, Georgia); Montverde Academy (Montverde, Florida)
- College: Washington (2015–2019)
- NBA draft: 2019: undrafted
- Playing career: 2019–present

Career history
- 2019: Maccabi Ashdod
- 2019–2020: Bnei Herzliya
- 2020–2021: VfL AstroStars Bochum
- 2021–2022: Cheshire Phoenix
- 2022–2023: Starwings Basel
- 2023–2024: Landstede Hammers
- 2024–2025: OSE Lions
- 2025–present: Anhui Wenyi

Career highlights
- First-team All-Pac 12 (2018)

Noah Lawrence Dickerson (born February 1, 1997) is an American basketball player for the Anhui Wenyi of the National Basketball League (NBL). He played college basketball for the Washington Huskies. As a junior, he was named first-team all-conference in the Pac-12.

== Early life ==
Born in Maplewood, New Jersey, Dickerson and his family moved to Atlanta, Georgia when he was 8 years old. He has a twin brother, Jordan. Dickerson attended The Lovett School and North Atlanta High School before transferring to Montverde Academy, where he played alongside Ben Simmons and D'Angelo Russell, and graduated in 2015.

== College career ==
As a sophomore with Washington, Dickerson posted averages of 12.5 points and 8.2 rebounds per game on a 9–22 team. Dickerson considered transferring after coach Lorenzo Romar was fired after the season and visited LSU, but opted to return to Washington. He had 25 points and seven rebounds in a 78–75 win over Arizona on February 3, 2018. As a junior, Dickerson averaged 15.3 points and 8.4 rebounds per game, shooting 56.3 percent from the field. He led the Huskies to a 21–13 season and was named to the first-team All-Pac-12. Following the season he declared for the 2018 NBA draft but did not hire an agent, leaving open the possibility of returning to school. On May 30, 2018, Dickerson withdrew from the NBA Draft to return to Washington for senior season. As a senior with Washington, he averaged 12.3 points, 7.5 rebounds and 1 steals, while shooting 55 percent from the field.

== Professional career ==
On July 26, 2019, Dickerson started his professional career with Maccabi Ashdod of the Israeli Premier League, signing a one-year deal. In 8 games played for Ashdod, he averaged 10.6 points and 6.6 rebounds per game.

On December 14, 2019, Dickerson parted ways with Ashdod to join Bnei Herzliya, signing a two-month contract with an option to extend it for the rest of the season. He appeared in four games for Herzliya, averaging 11.7 points and 7.8 rebounds per game. On January 30, 2020, Dickerson parted ways with Herzliya.

Dickerson joined VfL AstroStars Bochum of the German ProB midway through the 2020–21 season. He helped the team earn promotion into the ProA due to the Astrostars finishing with a league-best 25–5 record. On July 29, 2021, Dickerson signed with Cheshire Phoenix of the British Basketball League (BBL).
