= Bojan Subotić =

Serbian-Montenegrin basketball player

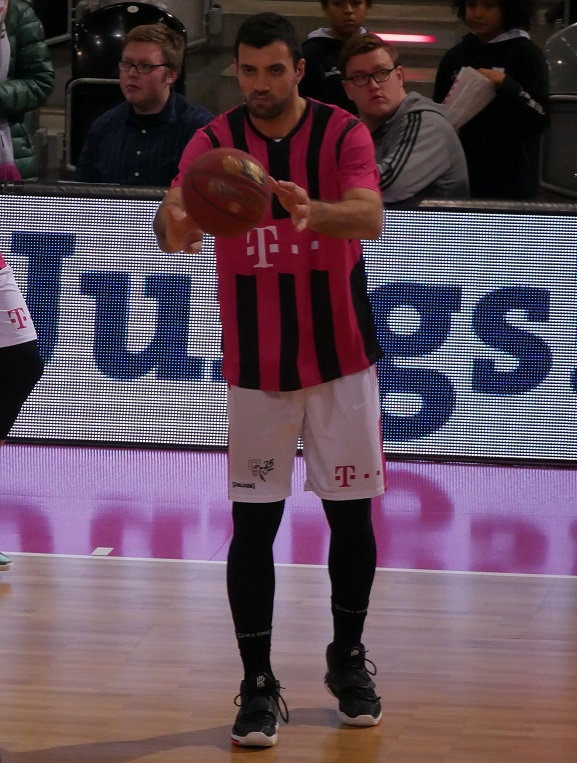
- Subotic with Baskets Bonn in 2019.

Szolnoki Olajbányász
- Position: Power forward
- League: Nemzeti Bajnokság I/A

Personal information
- Born: December 17, 1990 (age 35) Tivat, SR Montenegro, SFR Yugoslavia
- Listed height: 6 ft 8 in (2.03 m)
- Listed weight: 222 lb (101 kg)

Career information
- NBA draft: 2012: undrafted
- Playing career: 2009–present

Career history
- 2009–2011: Radnički Basket
- 2011: FMP Železnik
- 2011–2013: Crvena zvezda
- 2013–2017: Budućnost Podgorica
- 2017–2018: BC Kalev
- 2018–2020: Telekom Baskets Bonn
- 2021–2023: Szolnoki Olaj
- 2023–present: FMP
- 2024–present: Szolnoki Olaj

Career highlights
- 4× Montenegrin League champion (2014–2017); Estonian League champion (2018); Serbian Cup winner (2013); 4× Montenegrin Cup winner (2014–2017); Estonian League First Team (2018)
Medals
Men's basketball
Representing Serbia and Montenegro
U16 European Championship
| Bronze medal – third place | 2006 Spain | U16 National Team |

Bojan Subotić (Serbian Cyrillic: Бојан Суботић, born December 17, 1990) is a Serbian-Montenegrin professional basketball player for Szolnoki Olaj of the Hungarian Nemzeti Bajnokság I/A League.

Bojan trained at KK Tivat and FMP youth teams. With FMP he won Nike International Junior Tournament. He began his pro career with Radnički Basket and FMP. He then played two seasons with Crvena zvezda. In July 2013, Subotić signed with Budućnost Podgorica.

During the 2019–20 season, he averaged 8.2 points and 3.9 rebounds per game for Telekom Baskets Bonn. He parted ways with the team on June 23, 2020.

In August 2020 he signed for Szolnoki Olaj of the Hungarian NB I/A and FIBA Europe Cup.
