= Fardaws Aimaq =

Canadian basketball player (born 1999)

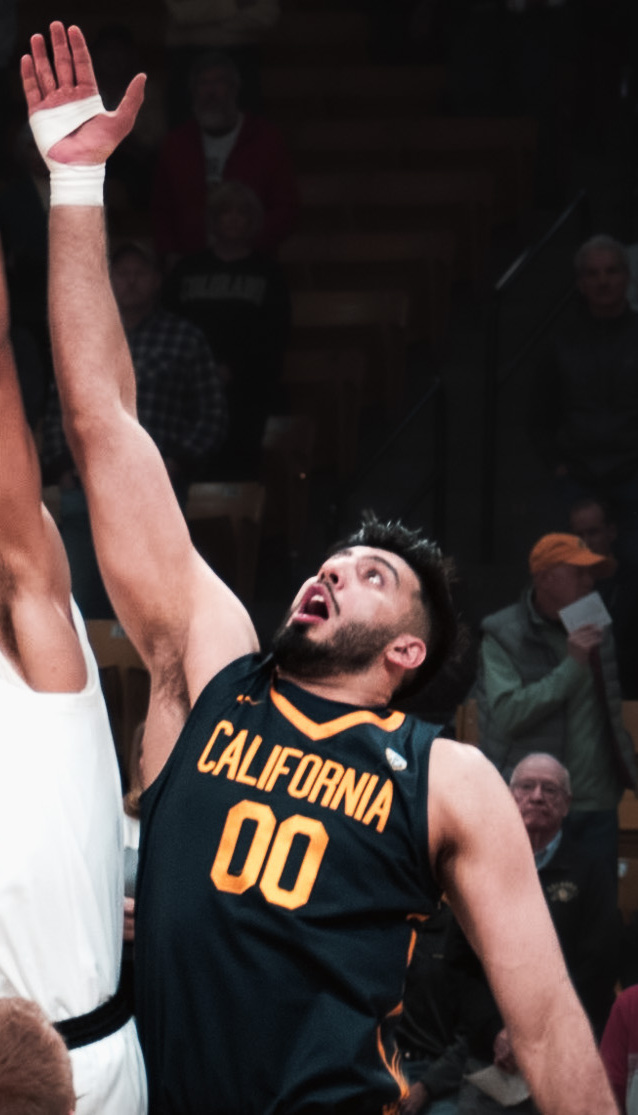
- Aimaq with the California Golden Bears in 2024

No. 00 – Kobe Storks
- Position: Center
- League: B.League

Personal information
- Born: January 6, 1999 (age 27) Vancouver, British Columbia, Canada
- Listed height: 6 ft 11 in (2.11 m)
- Listed weight: 245 lb (111 kg)

Career information
- High school: Steveston-London (Richmond, British Columbia); Bridgton Academy (Bridgton, Maine)
- College: Mercer (2018–2019); Utah Valley (2020–2022); Texas Tech (2022–2023); California (2023–2024)
- Playing career: 2024–present

Career history
- 2024–2025: Szolnoki Olajbányász
- 2025–2026: Lietkabelis Panevėžys
- 2026: TSG GhostHawks
- 2026–present: Kobe Storks

Career highlights
- NCAA rebounding leader (2021); WAC Player of the Year (2021); 2× WAC Defensive Player of the Year (2021, 2022); 2× First-team All-WAC (2021, 2022); WAC All-Defensive team (2022)

Fardaws Fazalrahman Aimaq (born January 6, 1999) is a Canadian professional basketball player for Kobe Storks of the B.League. He previously played for the Mercer Bears, Utah Valley Wolverines, Texas Tech Red Raiders, and California Golden Bears.

== Early life ==
Aimaq grew up swimming and practiced mixed martial arts for 11 years, earning a black belt. He started playing competitive basketball after growing to 6'3" during eighth grade. Aimaq attended Steveston-London Secondary School in Richmond, British Columbia. He led his team to its first-ever AAA provincial title game. Aimaq played a postgraduate season at Bridgton Academy in Bridgton, Maine. He averaged 18.6 points and 13.8 rebounds per game, earning First Team All-NEPSAC Class AAA honors. Aimaq committed to playing college basketball for Mercer.

== College career ==
As a freshman at Mercer, Aimaq averaged five points and 5.3 rebounds per game. He left the program after head coach Bob Hoffman was fired. He transferred to Utah Valley and sat out for one season due to NCAA transfer rules. On December 12, 2020, Aimaq scored 27 points and grabbed a program-record 20 rebounds in a 93–88 loss to Wyoming. On January 15, 2021, he recorded 29 points and 14 rebounds in a 93–92 win over Seattle. On February 13, Aimaq posted 18 points and 25 rebounds, breaking his program record for rebounds in a game, as Utah Valley lost to Dixie State, 93–89. As a sophomore, he led NCAA Division 1 in rebounding with 15 rebounds per game in addition to 13.9 points, 1.6 assists and 1.7 blocks per game. Aimaq was named WAC Men's Basketball Player of the Year and WAC Men's Basketball Defensive Player of the Year. Following the season, he declared for the 2021 NBA draft, but ultimately returned to Utah Valley for his junior season. As a junior, he averaged a career-high 18.9 points per game, along with 13.6 rebounds, 1.7 assists, and 1.3 blocks. He repeated as the WAC Defensive Player of the Year as well as a First Team All-WAC honor.

On March 18, 2022, Aimaq entered the transfer portal and also declared for the 2022 NBA draft while maintaining his college eligibility. On April 30, 2022, Aimaq committed to Texas Tech. He suffered a foot injury prior to the season, which limited him to only 11 games played. He averaged 11.1 points and 7.9 rebounds per game. Following the season, Aimaq exercised his additional year of eligibility and announced he would again enter the transfer portal. On April 7, 2023, Aimaq committed to California, reuniting with head coach Mark Madsen whom he played for at Utah Valley.

After a tournament game in November 2023, Aimaq was captured on video confronting a man in the stands. The man had allegedly hurled verbal abuse at Aimaq during the game. The man was approached and threatened by Aimaq. No other fans during the game overhead the "slurs." Aimaq's coach came to his defense, citing the fan's abuse as abhorrent, but not condoning Aimaq's actions.

== Professional career ==
On July 26, 2024, Aimaq signed with Szolnoki Olajbányász of the Hungarian League.

On June 27, 2025, Aimaq signed with Lietkabelis Panevėžys of the Lithuanian Basketball League (LKL) and the EuroCup. However, his contract was terminated by mutual consent on September 8, 2025. On November 19, 2025, Aimaq returned to Lietkabelis after recovering from injury, replacing Augustine Rubit. He left the team on March 6, 2026.

On March 28, 2026, Aimaq signed with TSG GhostHawks of the Taiwanese P. League+.

== Career statistics ==
Legend
GP	Games played	GS	Games started	MPG	Minutes per game
FG%	Field goal percentage	3P%	3-point field goal percentage	FT%	Free throw percentage
RPG	Rebounds per game	APG	Assists per game	SPG	Steals per game
BPG	Blocks per game	PPG	Points per game	**Bold**	Career high

=== EuroCup ===
Year	Team	GP	GS	MPG	FG%	3P%	FT%	RPG	APG	SPG	BPG	PPG	PIR
2025–26	Lietkabelis	10	9	22.9	.519	.250	.583	9.6	1.6	.5	.4	10.2	14.7
Career		10	9	22.9	.519	.250	.583	9.6	1.6	.5	.4	10.2	14.7

=== College ===
*	Led NCAA Division I

Year	Team	GP	GS	MPG	FG%	3P%	FT%	RPG	APG	SPG	BPG	PPG
2018–19	Mercer	29	5	14.9	**.517**	**1.000**	.420	5.3	.2	.2	.8	5.0
2019–20	Utah Valley	Redshirt										
2020–21	Utah Valley	22	22	30.5	.485	**1.000**	.618	**15.0***	1.6	.2	**1.7**	13.9
2021–22	Utah Valley	**32**	**32**	**34.4**	.490	.435	.723	13.6	1.7	.7	1.3	**18.9**
2022–23	Texas Tech	11	9	27.5	.443	.278	**.742**	7.9	1.5	.5	.3	11.1
2023–24	California	**32**	**32**	32.1	.386	.302	.650	11.0	**2.1**	**.9**	1.0	14.5
Career		126	100	28.0	.480	.361	.653	10.8	1.4	.5	1.1	13.0

== Personal life ==
Aimaq's father, Faramarz, is from Afghanistan but moved to Germany, before settling in Canada, to escape the Soviet-Afghan War. Aimaq is a Muslim.
