= Nikola Popović (basketball) =

Serbian basketball player (born 1997)

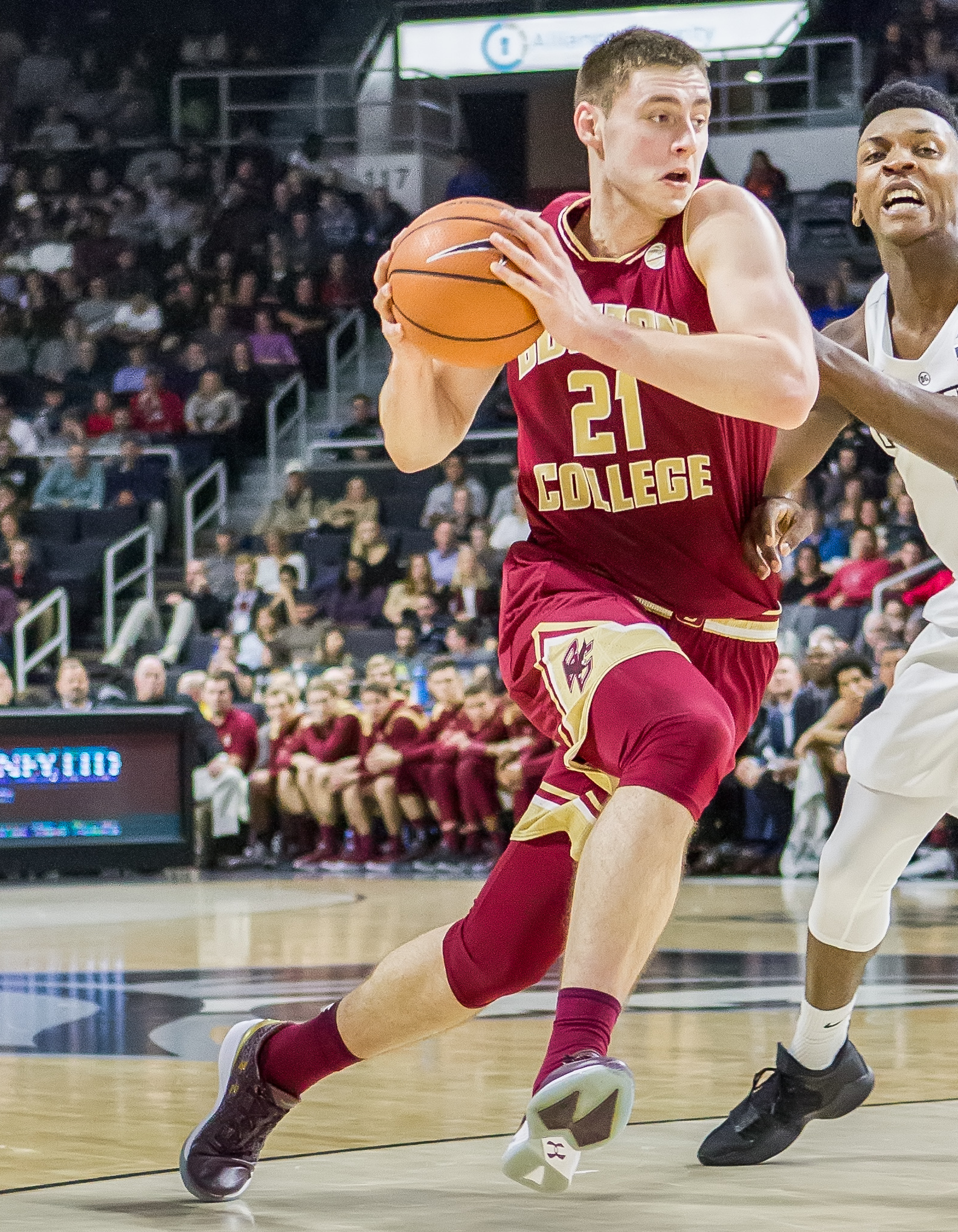
- Popović with Boston College in 2017

No. 21 – Bosna
- Position: Center
- League: Bosnian League; ABA League; EuroCup

Personal information
- Born: 19 July 1997 (age 29) Banja Luka, Bosnia and Herzegovina
- Listed height: 2.11 m (6 ft 11 in)
- Listed weight: 115 kg (254 lb)

Career information
- High school: Sagemont School (Weston, Florida)
- College: Boston College (2016–2020)
- NBA draft: 2020: undrafted
- Playing career: 2020–present

Career history
- 2020–2021: Crvena zvezda
- 2020: →FMP
- 2021: Chemidor Qom
- 2021–2023: Okapi Aalst
- 2023–2024: Lietkabelis Panevėžys
- 2024–2025: Szombathely Falco
- 2025–2026: Igokea
- 2026–present: Bosna
Medals
Men's basketball
Representing Serbia
FIBA Under-17 World Championship
| Bronze medal – third place | 2014 UAE | Team |

Nikola Popović (Serbian Cyrillic: Никола Поповић; born 19 July 1997), also known as Nik Popovic, is a Serbian professional basketball player for Bosna of the Bosnian League, the ABA League, and the EuroCup. He played college basketball for the Boston College Eagles.

== Early career ==
Popović was born in Banja Luka, Republika Srpska, Bosnia and Herzegovina. He was a member of the Crvena zvezda under-18 team that lost to Real Madrid in the 2014–15 Euroleague Next Generation Tournament Final. Over four games in the final tournament, he averaged 5.8 points and five rebounds per game.

== High school career ==
Popović began playing high school basketball in 2015 with the Sagemont School in Weston, Florida. In his senior year, he averaged 8.0 points, 7.0 rebounds, and 3.0 blocks per game, earning him All-County First Team honors.

== College career ==
Popović posted 6.1 points and 3.5 rebounds per game as a freshman at Boston College. As a sophomore, Popović averaged 9.9 points and 6.2 rebounds per game, starting 33 games. He had 20 points against Georgia Tech in the ACC Tournament. Popović averaged 14.5 points and 7.2 rebounds per game as a junior at Boston College. As a senior, Popović averaged 10.5 points and 5.2 rebounds per game. His season was marred by a back injury that forced him to miss a substantial number of games. Popović had a season-high 23 points in a 100–85 loss to Belmont. He played the forward position as #21.

== Professional career ==
=== 2020–2021 season ===
On 7 June 2020, Popović signed a four-year contract with Crvena zvezda. On the same day, he was loaned to FMP for the 2020–21 season. On 24 December 2020, Popovic decided to leave FMP. He played only one game for FMP in 2020. In January 2021, Popović parted ways with the FMP to sign with Chemidor Qom of the Iranian SuperLeague. He averaged 15.6 points, 8.9 rebounds, 1.7 assists and 1.1 steals per game.

=== Okapi Aalst (2021–2023) ===
On 9 August 2021, Popović signed with the Belgian team Okapi Aalst.

=== Lietkabelis Panevėžys (2023–2024) ===
On 16 January 2023, Popović signed with Lietkabelis Panevėžys of the Lithuanian Basketball League (LKL) until the end of the season.

=== Igokea (2025-present) ===
On July 9, 2025, he signed with Igokea m:tel of the Bosnian League.

== National team career ==
Popović was a member of the Serbian under-17 team that won the bronze medal at the 2014 FIBA Under-17 World Championship in Dubai, United Arab Emirates. Over six tournament games, he averaged 7.3 points, 4.7 rebounds, and 1.3 assists per game. Also, he was a member of the Serbian under-18 team that finished 5th at the 2015 FIBA Europe Under-18 Championship in Volos, Greece. Over nine tournament games, he averaged 5.6 points, four rebounds, and one assist per game.

== Career statistics ==
Legend
| GP | Games played | GS | Games started | MPG | Minutes per game |
| FG% | Field goal percentage | 3P% | 3-point field goal percentage | FT% | Free throw percentage |
| RPG | Rebounds per game | APG | Assists per game | SPG | Steals per game |
| BPG | Blocks per game | PPG | Points per game | **Bold** | Career high |

=== College ===
| Year | Team | GP | GS | MPG | FG% | 3P% | FT% | RPG | APG | SPG | BPG | PPG |
|---|---|---|---|---|---|---|---|---|---|---|---|---|
| 2016–17 | Boston College | 29 | 1 | 13.8 | .488 | .294 | .531 | 3.5 | .4 | .1 | .3 | 6.1 |
| 2017–18 | Boston College | **35** | **33** | 26.0 | .507 | .200 | .713 | 6.2 | 1.3 | .4 | **.8** | 9.9 |
| 2018–19 | Boston College | 28 | 24 | **29.6** | **.526** | .256 | **.714** | **7.2** | 1.1 | .5 | **.8** | **14.5** |
| 2019–20 | Boston College | 20 | 13 | 25.6 | .435 | **.333** | .660 | 5.2 | **1.6** | **1.1** | .5 | 10.5 |
| Career | | 112 | 71 | 23.7 | .496 | .277 | .682 | 5.6 | 1.1 | .5 | .6 | 10.2 |

=== EuroCup ===
| Year | Team | GP | GS | MPG | FG% | 3P% | FT% | RPG | APG | SPG | BPG | PPG | PIR |
|---|---|---|---|---|---|---|---|---|---|---|---|---|---|
| 2022–23 | Lietkabelis | 8 | 5 | 17.4 | **.650** | **.000** | .773 | **4.8** | .9 | .3 | **.4** | 8.6 | 11.6 |
| 2023–24 | Lietkabelis | **14** | **11** | **19.3** | .575 | .000 | **.886** | 3.9 | **1.5** | **.6** | .1 | **10.3** | **11.4** |
| Career | | 22 | 16 | 19.2 | .612 | .000 | .809 | 4.2 | 1.3 | .5 | .2 | 9.7 | 10.4 |
