= Strahinja Jovanović =

Serbian footballer

Personal information
- Date of birth: 1 June 1999 (age 27)
- Place of birth: Leskovac, FR Yugoslavia
- Height: 1.76 m (5 ft 9 in)
- Position: Winger

Team information
- Current team: Zhetysu
- Number: 90

Youth career
- Partizan

Senior career*
Years	Team	Apps	(Gls)
2017–2020	Partizan	3	(0)
2017	→ Teleoptik (loan)	16	(5)
2018	→ Proleter Novi Sad (loan)	10	(0)
2019-2020	→ Teleoptik (loan)	14	(1)
2020–2021	Spartak Subotica	21	(0)
2021–2022	Žarkovo	30	(3)
2022–2024	Železničar Pančevo	47	(4)
2024	Radnik Bijeljina	13	(2)
2025	Okzhetpes	21	(5)
2026–	Zhetysu	23	(1)

International career
2015	Serbia U16	4	(0)
2016	Serbia U18	1	(0)
2017–2018	Serbia U19	7	(2)
2018	Serbia U21	2	(0)
- * Club domestic league appearances and goals as of 1 November 2026

Strahinja Jovanović (Serbian Cyrillic: Страхиња Јовановић; born 1 June 1999) is a Serbian professional footballer who plays as a forward for Kazakhstani club Zhetysu.

== Club career ==
Born in Leskovac, Jovanović came through the youth system at Partizan. He was loaned to their affiliated side Teleoptik in early 2017. Subsequently, Jovanović helped the side win the Serbian League Belgrade and promotion to the Serbian First League.

In early 2018, Jovanović returned to Partizan and was given the number 90 shirt. He made his competitive debut for the club on 5 May 2018, coming on as a substitute for Zoran Tošić in their 2–2 home league draw versus Napredak Kruševac.

In July 2018, Jovanović was loaned to newly promoted Serbian SuperLiga club Proleter Novi Sad. He returned to Partizan in early 2019, before being loaned back to Teleoptik until the end of the season.

== International career ==
Jovanović made his debut for Serbia at under-19 level during the 2018 UEFA European Under-19 Championship qualifying stage. He made his debut for the under-21 team in a friendly against the Qatar U23s in December 2017.

== Honours ==
Teleoptik

- Serbian League Belgrade: 2016–17

Partizan

- Serbian Cup: 2017–18
