= Lester Medford =

American basketball player (born 1993)

Hapoel Holon
- Position: Point guard
- League: Israeli Basketball Premier League

Personal information
- Born: May 24, 1993 (age 33) Tucson, Arizona, U.S.
- Listed height: 5 ft 10 in (1.78 m)
- Listed weight: 175 lb (79 kg)

Career information
- High school: Amphitheater (Tucson, Arizona)
- College: Indian Hills CC (2012–2014); Baylor (2014–2016)
- NBA draft: 2016: undrafted
- Playing career: 2016–present

Career history
- 2016–2017: Falco Szombathely
- 2017: Lions de Genève
- 2017–2018: Nevėžis
- 2018–2019: MZT Skopje
- 2019–2020: VEF Rīga
- 2020: Start Lublin
- 2020–2021: Legia Warszawa
- 2021–2022: San Giobbe
- 2023–2024: Juvi Cremona
- 2024: CBet Jonava
- 2024–2025: Rostock Seawolves
- 2025: Alba Fehérvár
- 2025–2026: Slovan Bratislava
- 2026: Gambusinos de Fresnillo
- 2026–present: Hapoel Holon

Career highlights
- North Macedonia League champion (2019); Latvian League champion (2020)

Lester Medford (born May 24, 1993) is an American professional basketball player for Hapoel Holon of the Israeli Basketball Premier League. He played college basketball. He played college basketball at Indian Hills from 2012 to 2013 and Baylor Bears from 2014 to 2016.

== College career ==
As a senior at Baylor in 2015-16, Medford averaged 8.9 points, 2.2 rebounds and 6.5 assists in 32.4 minutes in 34 appearances. He scored 16 points and 5 assists in a 61–80 home lose against Texas.

== Professional career ==
After graduating, Medford signed with Falco KC Szombathely of Nemzeti Bajnokság I/A. On October 12, 2016, he made his debut for Falco against Alba Fehérvár scoring 15 points and 2 assists. On 15 October 2016, he scored 25 points, 10 rebounds and 2 assists in an 88–80 home win against Vasas Budapest. On 14 December 2016, he signed with Nevėžis Kėdainiai from the Lithuanian basketball league. On June 27, 2018, he signed with the Macedonian basketball club MZT Skopje. On his debut for MZT Skopje on September 27, 2018, he scored 10 points and 9 assists in a 92–79 home win against Helios Suns On July 23, 2019, he signed with VEF Rīga. He averaged 14.1 points and 6.2 assists per game. Medford signed with Start Lublin of the Polish Basketball League on July 27, 2020.

On December 3, 2020, he has signed with Legia Warszawa of the Polish Basketball League.

On January 9, 2024, it was reported that Medford signed with CBet Jonava of the Lithuanian Basketball League (LKL).
