= Tiszaligeti Sportcsarnok =

Multifunctional Indoor Hall in Szolnok, Hungary

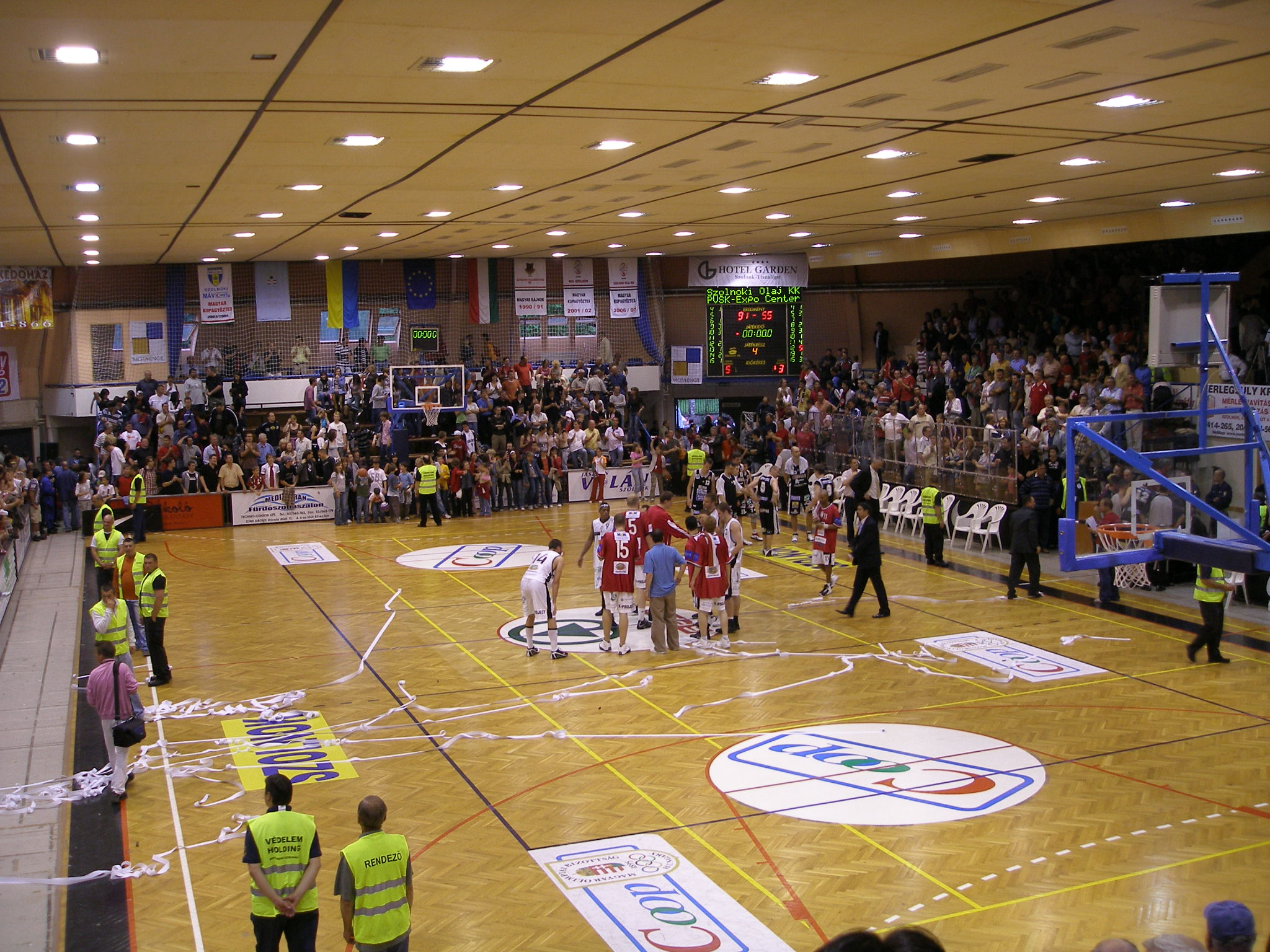
- Interactive map of Tiszaligeti Sportcsarnok
- Coordinates: 47.16873°N 20.19676°E
- Owner: City of Szolnok
- Operator: Szolnoki Sportcentrum Nonprofit Kft.
- Capacity: 2,200 (basketball)

Construction
- Built: 1975
- Renovated: 2001–2002

Tenant
- Szolnoki Olaj KK

Tiszaligeti Sportcsarnok is multifunctional indoor hall in Szolnok, Hungary. The arena is primarily used for basketball, as it is the home of Hungarian top division side Szolnoki Olaj KK and regularly hosts the matches of the Hungarian national basketball team. In the sports hall are organized other indoor sport events as well, such as futsal and volleyball matches, but it also welcomes non-sporting events, for example fairs, exhibitions and conferences.

The hall was built in 1975, but with time it started to become obsolete. To keep it a state-of-the-art arena, Tisztaligeti Sportcsarnok went through a complete renovation between 2001 and 2002 for 386 million Hungarian Forint (approximately US$1.75 million), and was re-opened on 23 March 2002.
