= Zoltán Perl =

Hungarian basketball player

No. 9 – Falco KC Szombathely
- Position: Guard
- League: Nemzeti Bajnokság I/A

Personal information
- Born: June 28, 1995 (age 31) Szombathely, Hungary
- Listed height: 195 cm (6 ft 5 in)
- Listed weight: 85 kg (187 lb)

Career information
- Playing career: 2014–present

Career history
- 2012–2015: Falco Szombathely
- 2015–2017: Betaland Capo d'Orlando
- 2017: Universo Treviso
- 2017–2018: Falco Szombathely
- 2018–2019: Estudiantes
- 2019–present: Falco Szombathely

Career highlights
- 5x Hungarian League champion (2019, 2021-2024); 2x Hungarian Cup winner (2021, 2023)

Zoltán Perl (born June 28, 1995) is a Hungarian professional basketball player for Falco Szombathely of the Nemzeti Bajnokság I/A.

== Professional career ==
In June 2015, Perl signed a 2-year contract with Betaland Capo d'Orlando of the Italian top tier LBA. In the 2016–17 season, Perl averaged 4.5 points per game in 14.8 minutes per game. In February 2017, Perl transferred to Universo Treviso Basket of the Serie A2.

In June 2018, Perl signed with Movistar Estudiantes of the Spanish Liga ACB.

On January 18, 2019, he has signed with his old club Falco Szombathely of the Nemzeti Bajnokság I/A. He signed a three-year extension with the team on May 11, 2020.
