= List of Russian Orthodox monasteries =

This is a list of Russian Orthodox monasteries.

== A ==
- Alexander Nevsky Lavra
- Alexander-Svirsky Monastery
- Alexeevsky Monastery
- Antonievo-Siysky Monastery
- Arkazhsky Monastery
- Ascension Convent

== B ==
- Bogoyavlensky Monastery (Kostroma)
- Bogoyavlensky Monastery (Uglich)
- Borisoglebsky Monastery (Borisoglebsky)
- Borisoglebsky Monastery (Dmitrov)

== C ==
- Chernigovsky Skit
- Chrysostom Monastery
- Chudov Monastery
- Conception Convent

== D ==
- Danilov Monastery
- Donskoy Monastery

== E ==
- Epiphany Monastery

== F ==
- Ferapontov Monastery

== G ==
- Ganina Yama
- Goritsky Monastery (Goritsy)
- Goritsky Monastery (Pereslavl-Zalessky)

== H ==
- Holy Trinity Monastery (Jordanville, New York)

== I ==
- Ipatiev Monastery

== J ==
- Joseph-Volokolamsk Monastery

== K ==
- Kamenny Monastery
- Khutyn Monastery
- Kirillo-Belozersky Monastery
- Kizichesky Monastery
- Klobukov Monastery
- Klyuchegorsky Kazan Mother of God Monastery
- Konevsky Monastery
- Korennaya Pustyn Monastery (Korennaya Pustyn)
- Kozheozersky Monastery
- Krestny Monastery at Kiy Island
- Krutitsy
- Krypetsky Monastery

== L ==
- Luzhetsky Monastery

== M ==
- Makaryev Monastery
- Marfo-Mariinsky Convent
- Monastery of Our Lady of Kazan (Tambov)

== N ==
- New Jerusalem Monastery
- Nikolo-Babaysky Monastery
- Nikolo-Korelsky Monastery
- Nikolo-Perervinsky Monastery
- Nikolo-Ugresh monastery
- Novodevichy Convent
- Novospassky Monastery

== O ==
- Optina Monastery

== P ==
- Pafnutievo-Borovsky Monastery
- Pavlo-Obnorsky Monastery
- Pechenga Monastery
- Pokrovsky Monastery (Moscow)
- Pokrovsky Monastery (Suzdal)
- Pskovo-Pechorsky Monastery
- Pühtitsa Convent

== R ==
- Rizopolozhensky Monastery
- Rozhdestvensky monastery (Moscow)
- Rozhdestvensky monastery (Vladimir)

== S ==
- Sanaksar Monastery
- Savvino-Storozhevsky Monastery
- Serafimo-Diveevsky Monastery
- Simonov Monastery
- Solovetsky Monastery
- Spaso-Borodinsky Monastery
- Sretensky Monastery (Kashin)
- Sretensky Monastery (Gorohovets)
- Sretensky Monastery (Moscow)
- Sretensky Monastery (Pereslavl-Zalessky)
- St. Andronik Monastery
- Svensky Monastery

== T ==
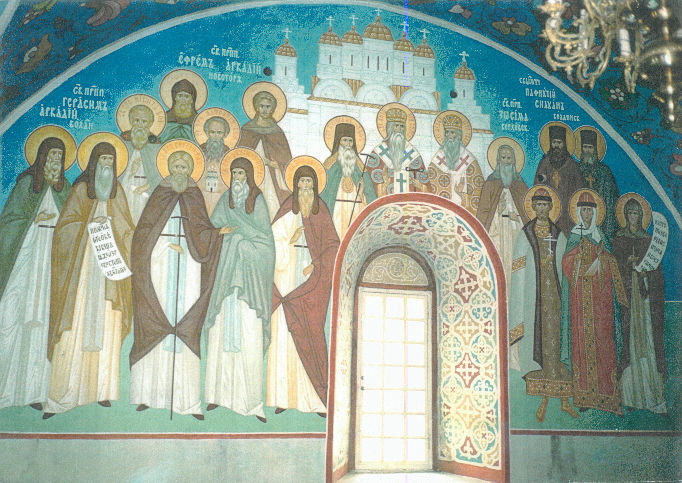
Troitsky Boldin Monastery. Vvedenskaja Church. Fresco (with Saint Gerasim Boldinsky in left)

- Tikhvinsky Monastery (Tikhvin)
- Transfiguration Monastery (Staraya Russa)
- Troitse-Danilov Monastery
- Troitse-Sergiyeva Lavra
- Troitsky Boldin Monastery
- Troitsky Makariev Monastery

== V ==
- Valaam Monastery
- Vysokopetrovsky Monastery
- Vysotsky Monastery

== Y ==
- Yelizarov Monastery
- Yuriev Monastery

== Z ==
- Zaikonospassky monastery

== See also ==
- List of Serbian Orthodox monasteries
