= Monastery of the Theotokos of Iveron (Samara) =

Orthodox cathedral in Samara, Russia

- Monastery of the Theotokos of Iveron
- Иверский монастырь
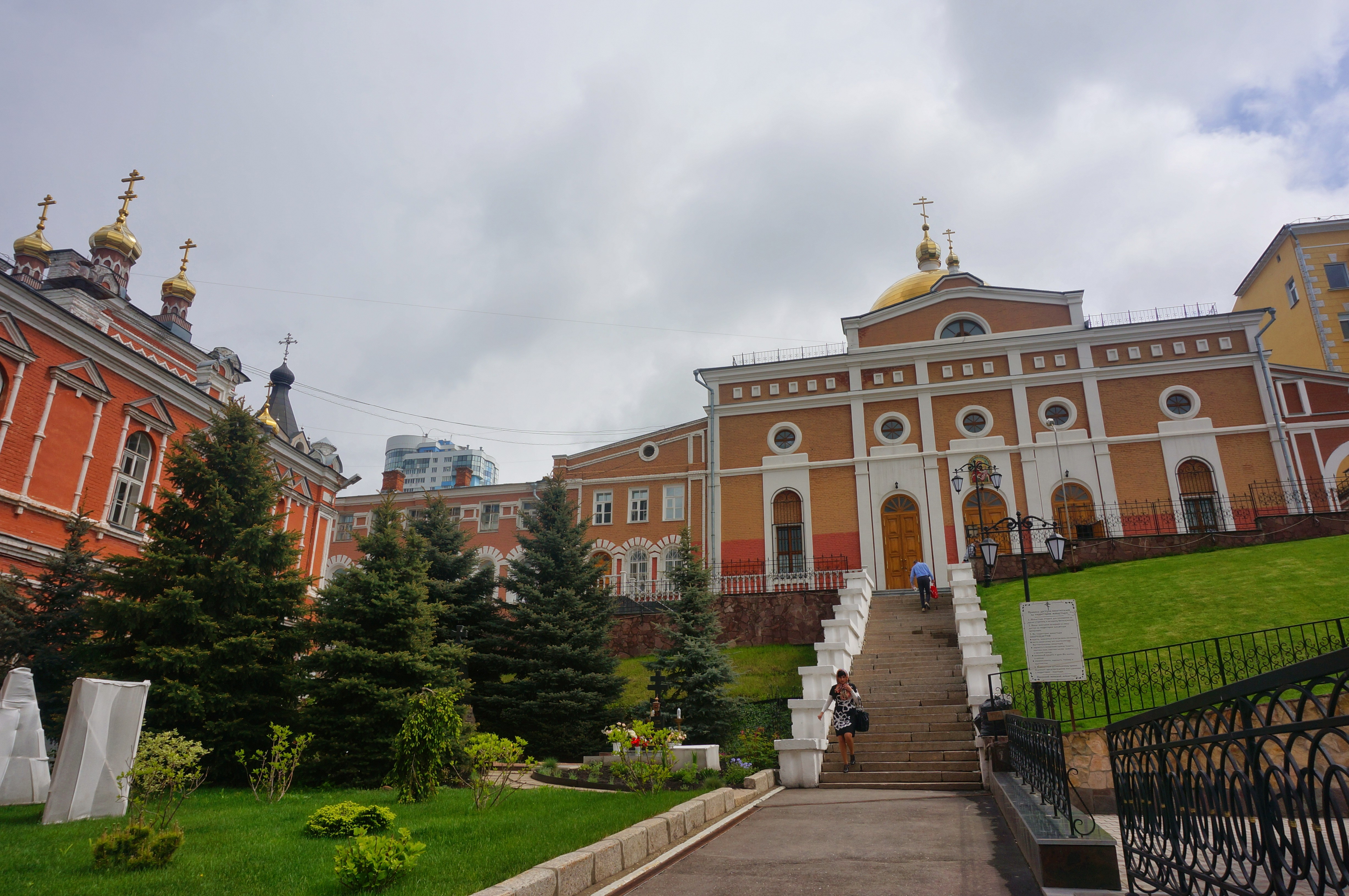
- Monastery of the Theotokos of Iveron
- 53.1201°N 50.0600°E
- Location: Samara
- Country: Russia
- Denomination: Orthodox Christian church
- Churchmanship: Diocese of Samara
- Website: https://iverskyi.ru/

History
- Status: Object of cultural heritage of Russia
- Founded: 1850

Architecture
- Architect: Konstantin Maker

Administration
- Diocese: Diocese of Samara

Monastery of the Theotokos of Iveron (in Russian: Иверский монастырь) is an Orthodox convent of the Samara and Tolyatti Eparchy of the Russian Orthodox Church.

In 1850 a women's religious community was founded in Samara. It got the imperial approval in 1855. In 1860, due to its successful development, the community was transformed into a convent, which at the beginning of the 20th century was home to about 400 nuns and residents. The monastery had a hospital, a school and several workshops, including one where the Samara flag was created. Divine services were held in three churches of the monastery, which were venerated in Samara shrines: the image of the Theotokos of Jerusalem and the image of the Theotokos of Iveron, which gave its name to the monastery. About a thousand people were buried in the cemetery of the monastery, including many prominent citizens. The monastery was a significant architectural ensemble that largely determined the view of Samara, especially from the Volga River.

During the Soviet period, the monastery continued to exist for some time as a sewing artel, but first all its valuables were taken away, and in 1925 it was closed. At the beginning of the 1930s, the monastery's Church of the Dormition of the Theotokos, the second largest church in Samara, was demolished and in its place apartment houses were built. The bell tower, the monastery fence, some buildings were also destroyed, the cemetery was ruined, the surviving churches housed various organizations, the buildings were given as housing to workers of local enterprises.

The revival of the monastery began in 1992, when the preserved temples and a part of the preserved buildings, recognized as an architectural monument of regional importance, were given to the established monastic community of the Orthodox Church. The churches of the monastery were restored and renovated, the bell tower of the monastery was rebuilt in its original place, preserving the appearance of the 19th century, a new chapel church was built, security and rescue works were carried out in the necropolis of the monastery. Nowadays, the monastery has a library for the parishioners, gold embroidery and icon painting workshops. In 1999, the monastery was visited by Patriarch Alexy II of Moscow, and since 2001 the relics of the locally venerated Saint Alexander Chagrinsky have been kept there.

== History ==
=== Context ===
In the 16th-18th centuries, there was a female Spaso-Preobrazhensky convent in Samara. In 1764, according to the Catherine II decree On the division of ecclesiastical property, the convent was abolished and the nuns were transferred to the Simbirsk Spassky Convent. In the city there arose a movement of women who tried to resemble the nuns in their dress and lifestyle, but did not take the monastic tonsure. In 1829, they tried to get permission to open an Orthodox women's community in the city, but they were not supported either by the citizens or by the diocesan leadership.

The idea of establishing such a community gradually gained the support of the citizens. M. I. Fedorov, the Samara land surveyor, who actively convinced the citizens of the necessity of opening a parish, did a lot for the establishment of the parish. He attracted to his side the priest of the Church of the Dormition of the Theotokos S. M. Belsky and the archpriest of the Kazan Cathedral I. G. Khalkolivanov, the merchants Baranov and Plotnikov, the nobleman Putilov and many others. For the future congregation he also donated his land on the outskirts of the city with the area of 100 x 60 fathoms in the area of Mechetnaya Street. In time, thanks to the support of prominent citizens, the idea of opening a parish was accepted by almost all Orthodox Samaritans.

=== Foundation ===
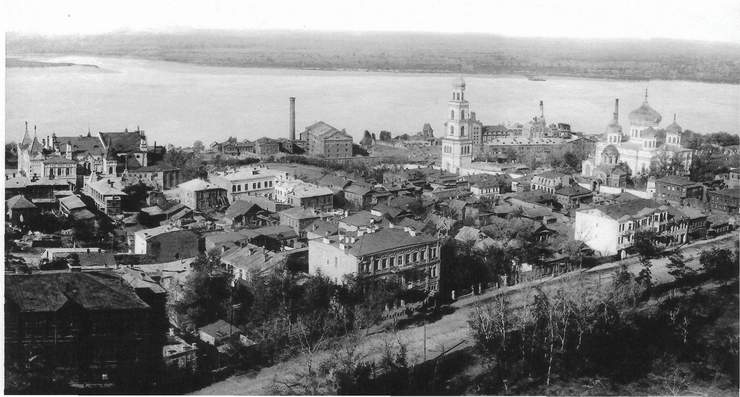
View from the Cathedral to the Monastery of the Theotokos of Iveron

In January 1850, the citizens of the city petitioned Bishop Theodotius of Simbirsk (Note: Samara then belonged to the Simbirsk diocese.) to open a women's community in Samara in memory of the destroyed monastery, pointing out that already 38 women wanted to devote themselves to monastic life. It was reported that there were a number of sectarians and old believers of various kinds living in Samara, and the establishment of the Orthodox community, if not eradicating sectarianism, would significantly weaken it. Theodotius sent the petition to the Holy Synod, attaching his own petition pointing out the necessity, timeliness and advantages of opening a parish in Samara.

The Synod asked for information about the means on which the new community would exist. In order to solve this problem, the city society formed a board of trustees for the future parish, which included the assessor Bogoroditsky, the merchant P. G. Baranov, the civil servant M. I. Fedorov, headed by the cathedral archpriest I. G. Khalkolivano. A city subscription was organized to collect funds for the establishment of the parish.

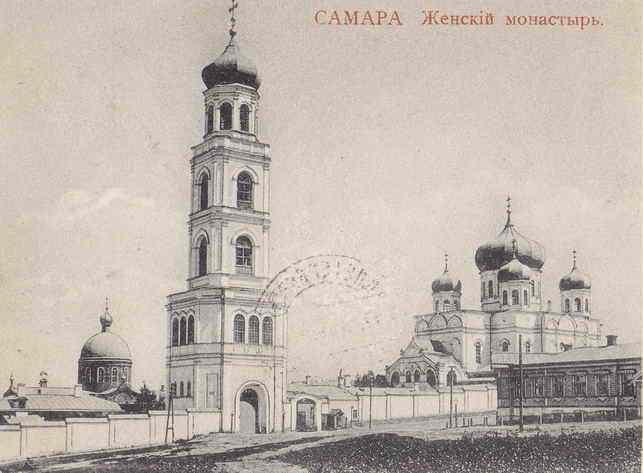
The Monastery of the Theotokos of Iveron, postcard from the early 20th century

Bishop Theodotius, for his part, authorized the establishment of two chapels with attached circles for the collection of funds. One was located in the Trinity Market, the other on the bank of the Volga River near the transportation center. In addition, four cord books were issued for the collection of donations, with which several nuns traveled throughout Russia, even visiting Siberia. Theodosius was also concerned with regulating the internal life of the community, for which purpose, at his request, a special charter was sent by the Nizhny Novgorod Ecclesiastical Consistory, which was in charge of four similar communities. The charter consisted of 49 paragraphs and defined the way of life, the order in the community, the relationship between the nuns, the behavior of the nuns, etc.

It turned out that the place proposed by Fedorov for the village was inconvenient. The city was developing in that direction and soon threatened to surround the territory of the village with houses and estates of the citizens. Besides, there were no wells for drinking water, and the distance of the territory from the Volga and Samara created too many difficulties with the water supply of the community. And although the merchant Evdokia Sinyagina, the civil servants P. Sukhova and O. Timasheva, and the citizen M. I. Nazarov were ready to donate their lands in Mechetnaya Street for the planned convent, the future inhabitants of the convent chose a new place. Now it was planned to build the cloister outside the city, not far from the Strukovsky Garden, which was then its extreme point, on the bank of the Volga. At that time it was a wasteland overgrown with bushes, with stony soil in some places, and shallow underground waters. In general, the place was suitable for vegetable gardens and orchards, and sufficiently isolated from the city, which corresponded to the idea of monastic life.

The trustees of the future community agreed with the proposed location. Following Fedorov's example, merchants M. N. Nazarov, I. N. Sinyagin and other citizens bought these homesteads and donated them to the community.

On September 14, 1850, Bishop Theodotius arrived in Samara, where he consecrated the place allotted to the community, laid a stone in the foundation of the future church of the monastery, and blessed the future residents with an icon of the Theotokos of Jerusalem. The next day, construction began. The nuns who had their own means built at their own expense, while those who did not had the help of benefactors and trustees. In November, the first building was completed, half of which was used for cells, and the second — under the chapel, which was donated to the community icons and church utensils. The Holy Trinity Church gave the community a four-pound bell to call to prayer. At the end of 1850, the chapel was consecrated by the archpriest of the Kazan Cathedral of Samara I.G. Khalkolivanov, began to send all-night vigils and hours.

Though the community was founded in memory of the Spaso-Preobrazhensky Monastery, and the bishop blessed it with the Theotokos of Jerusalem, but with the consent of the future nuns it was named Iverskaya, in fulfillment of the wish of the Yelabuga merchant E. I. Marikhina, who donated to the community a family icon of the Theotokos of Iveron in a precious frame. The first inhabitants of the community chose M.Y. Yanova as their superior. Already in 1834, she and some other nuns traveled to holy places, including monasteries, to study their way of life and principles of management.

In 1851, the community consisted of a chapel with living quarters and two small wings with cells. In total, about 40 nuns lived in the convent. Divine services were held first by the priests of the Kazan and Trinity Churches, then by the replaced off-duty priests of the Kazan Cathedral. On March 28 the first bishop of the Samara diocese, Eusebius, arrived in Samara. He continued the matter of the official opening of the community and informed the Synod that the community already numbered up to 100 people of various ages and ranks and that the monastery had up to 7 thousand rubles of capital and 5 thousand rubles of various contributions. However, Eminence Eusebius in order to open the community as soon as possible, or noticeably exaggerated the figures, or indicated the capital promised to the community after its foundation, but not actually available, because in fact in 1855 the community had only 500 rubles from the parish of public charity.

At the beginning of 1855, the territory of the parish was limited to a small plot of land of 120 × 60 sazhens, on which there was a church "with a miserable sacristy and the same furnishings", 3 wooden buildings of 12 sazhens in length, 3 wooden wings of 6 sazhens in length, all on stone foundations. The buildings were covered with wood and the rooms were cramped. The abbess lived in one of the buildings, the nuns lived in two buildings and two wings, and one wing was used as a refectory. Food was prepared by the nuns themselves. There was also a barn, a laundry, a carriage house, a stable, two cellars and a guard house. In the bell tower, four bells hung on four masts, the largest of which was 8 poods and weighed 4 pounds.

=== Community ===
==== Bishop Eusebius ====
On 12 March 1855, the Emperor Alexander II approved the decision of the Holy Synod on the acceptance of the Iveron women's community in Samara under the jurisdiction and patronage of the spiritual and civil authorities. On 20 April, M. Y. Yanova was officially appointed as the community's parson, by 24 April was complete, and on 27 April was consecrated in the name of the Theotokos of Iveron, the first church of the community, transformed from the monastery chapel. From that moment the community began to develop rapidly. Soon the territory of the monastery grew to almost 7 dessiatinas. Part of the land was allocated by the Municipality, which paid compensation to the owners of the farmsteads or gave them land elsewhere. Part of the community bought the land independently, using donated funds.

The development of the new territories began and within a year of the official approval several new buildings for the nuns were erected, all on stone foundations, measuring 10-12 fathoms long and 5-6 fathoms wide. The buildings were built at a potluck: each newly arrived sister had to build a cell at her own expense, which remained her property, and after her death was transferred to a relative, if there was one in the convent, or given to the community. In practice, 20-40 nuns invested in the construction of a new building, which was divided into cells based on the calculation of 2-4 nuns living in each. Further repairs to the building were the responsibility of the community. The building of almost the same size was built for the parish of the community: with four living quarters, outbuildings, separated from the rest of the community territory. However, due to the inexperience of the builders, the excessive speed of construction and the lack of funds, the buildings, which were unfinished and unplastered, began to require expensive major repairs in the mid-1870s.

In 1855, the monastery received a donation from the Alatyr merchant F. S. Schekin: a plot of 150 dessiatinas on the right bank of the Volga with arable land, deciduous forest and limestone mountains. However, it was not enough to ensure the reliable existence of the community, the means were only enough for its existence, but not for its further development.

==== Bishop Theophilus ====
Bishop Theophilus, who was appointed to Samara in 1857, visited the parish, found its financial situation unacceptable and found new sources of funding. He authorised the icon of Jerusalem to be taken to the homes of the citizens, accompanied by the parish and clergy. The religious people of Samara liked this idea: every wealthy citizen wanted to hold a prayer service with the icon, which was considered miraculous, after which he usually thanked the priest, the singers and the monastery generously. Theophilus found another source of money for the community. He allowed a cemetery to be opened in the area, where laypeople could be buried if they donated a sum of 100 rubles or more to the community. Theophilus also gave the Iveron community the monopoly of making wafers for all the churches of Samara, which also brought in very large sums. Finally, the diocesan authorities gave the community 3-4 cord books for collecting donations, with which the nuns collected considerable sums for the monastery throughout the country.

The improved financial situation of the convent made it possible to open an additional altar in the Iveron Monastery. The nuns who lived in the basement of the church were accommodated in cells in the buildings, the monastery storehouse was moved from the northern part of the foundation to the southern part, and in the northern part, on 13 July 1857, the Jerusalem side chapel was consecrated. Now the novices could attend the morning service and devote all the rest of their time to work for the good of the community, without interrupting to attend the liturgy, also increasing the influx of worshippers and their offerings for the good of the community. However, the new side chapel was small, cramped and dark, on holidays and Sundays due to the influx of people it was terribly stuffy, even the candles in front of the icons did not burn, but flickered and sometimes went out, the faithful had to go out for fresh air right during the service, so a year later a new, more spacious Sretensky temple was built.

On 26 September 1859, the abbess addressed a petition to Bishop Theophilus, in which she asked Vladyka not to leave them —orphans of his paternal mercy and his archpastoral intercession— to ask before whom permission to open tonsure in the community entrusted to her. The bishop replied that it was necessary first to raise the community to the rank of a monastery and then to ask for tonsure.

The petition to transform the community into a monastery was presented to the Synod on 24 January 1860. The Synod again asked for information about the financial situation of the community. The abbess, despite the fact that 150 tithes donated to the monastery could not reliably provide for it, and the other capital was only 7 thousand roubles for 190 living nuns, stated that the salary from the treasury did not count on a salary from the community and that the existing community content was considered satisfactory. The monastic priesthood, consisting of two priests and a deacon, who did not receive any salary or allowance and lived only on the offerings of the townspeople, also stated that the treasury did not ask for a salary, even if the community was raised to the status of a monastery. The only request of the community was the allocation of hay meadows, which the monastery did not have, but needed, as it had 10 heads of working and horned cattle.

=== Monastery ===
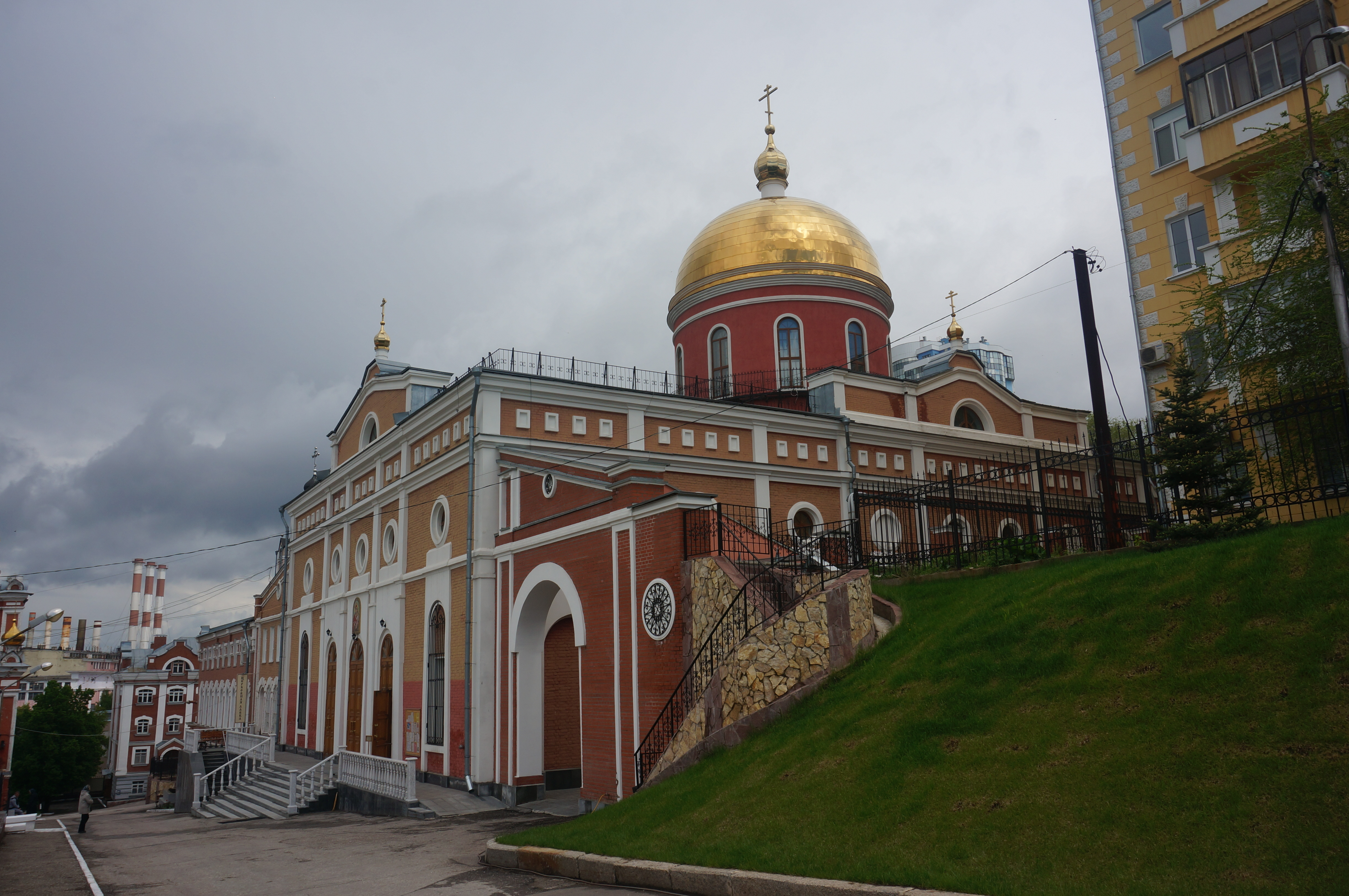
The Monastery of the Theotokos of Iveron

On 18 June 1860, Alexander II approved the decision of the Holy Synod on the transformation of the Samara community into a dormitory monastery.

At the same time, 20 nuns and the abbess were tonsured. One came from the clergy, two from the nobility, four from merchants, two from peasants and the rest from the bourgeoisie. They were between 40 and 60 years old. The monastic tonsure took place on 21 August, and a week later, on 21 August, the monastery was inaugurated in the presence of the city's clergy, civil authorities and a large crowd of people. Abbess Maria Yanova, known by monastic name Margarita, was elevated to the rank of abbess. By the order of the diocesan authorities the charter of the monastery was supplemented with 17 paragraphs taken from the charter of the Saratov Cross Exaltation Nunnery.

On the 8th of February 1861, by a government decree, the monastery was granted the meadows and fishing grounds requested by the abbess. These lands were located about 7-8 versts from Samara and, according to legend, once belonged to the Spaso-Preobrazhensky Monastery, which allowed the Iveron Monastery to consider itself the heir of the abolished monastery. A similar petition for the allotment of the monastery mill, also supported by Bishop Theophilus, was unsuccessful; the case dragged on until the bishop's death in 1866 and then remained unsatisfied. Then, disappointed by the government's refusal, the mayor of Samara and one of the monastery's regular donors, merchant V. Bureev, gave the monastery a plot of land adjacent to the monastery's meadows, which he had leased from the city for 99 years. An orchard with apples and cherries, raspberries, potatoes, cabbage, cucumbers and other crops was planted on this land, hay was cut and there were up to 50 beehives. A farmstead was built on the property for farming, where 10-15 nuns and hired labourers lived.

==== Bishop Gerasimus ====
In 1866, Bishop Gerasimus took over the cathedra of Samara. When he visited the Iveron Convent, he found that although it was officially called a dormitory, the nuns paid for everything themselves. There was no common meal; the refectory was used only for commemorative dinners. The bishop ordered the opening of a common meal, but there were no funds for it — everything went to the construction of the Sretensky church and the fence.

The boarding house was supported by benefactors. The noblewoman M. A. Vasilyeva donated 2000 roubles and 10 dessiatinas of land and supplied the monastery with seeds. On 21 November 1867, a procession of the crucifix was held, and Hieromonk Nicholas presided over it. This increased the donations, also to the inviolable capital.

In 1867, the bishop consecrated a side chapel, and in 1869, the main altar of the Sretensky church. Gerasim often celebrated the liturgy there, including important events: the foundation of the new cathedral and seminary, the ordination of hegumens and hegumenesses. On 12 January 1878, he held his last service in Samara.

In 1874, Abbess Margarita asked to retire due to a prolonged illness, and the management passed to the treasurers Eugenia, then Antonina. The new Abbess Antonina (from the 8th September 1874) was concerned with repairing the buildings, and solving the problem of a warm church. Because of the lack of space it was decided to rebuild the cellar of the Iveron Church with the help of 1000 roubles bequeathed by Captain Lobanov. In 1874, the wife of the comrade prosecutor died in Nice. Her parents, P.V. Alabin and V.V. Alabina, built a side church over her grave, consecrated on 24 November 1874 in honour of Saints Helena and Barbara.

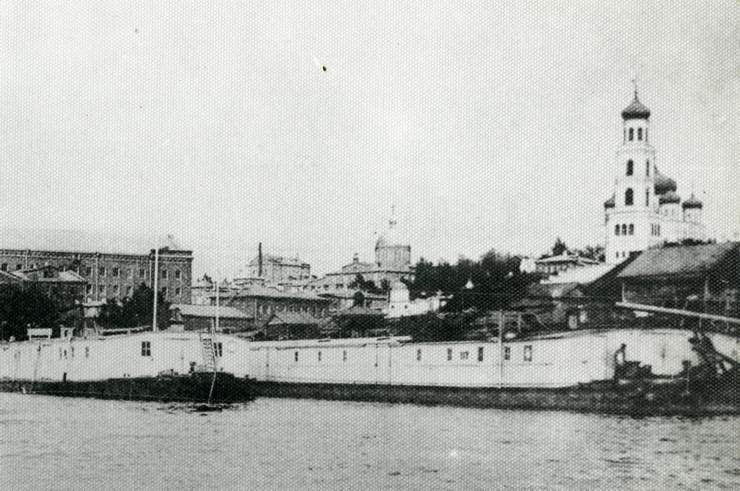
A view from Volga River

After that, Antonina was busy with improvements: the buildings were repaired, the roofs were replaced with iron ones, new buildings were built, the presbytery got a second floor. The stone fence was completed, the gilding of the crosses was renewed, a water supply system was installed, a church school and a mill were opened.

The convent was popular. In 1880, by the will of G. Gorbunova the convent received a yard, but later sold it for 1000 roubles. In 1879, the merchant P. Shikhobalova built a hospital for people.

Antonina's main business was the construction of a stone bell tower and a warm church. The bell tower had been planned since 1858, but until the 1870s there was only a belfry. Donations advanced the project: I. V. Zhukov donated 100,000 bricks and 1,000 roubles. Other benefactors also donated bricks (at least 10,000). On the advice of Bishop Gerasim, a bell tower was built at the Holy Gate. The cost was 27,845 rubles, most of which was covered by donations. A 500 pound bell and a gilded cross were installed.

In 1877, a monastery chapel was opened near the railway station, also built with funds from benefactors, mainly the mayor Piotr Alabin.

This is what Samarskiye Eparchial Vedomost wrote about the monastery in 1880:

The Monastery of the Theotokos of Iveron, situated on the slope of the steep bank of the Volga, is a great ornament of the town. The spires of the large church, standing on the crest of the bank, are the first thing that catches the eye of a traveller coming down the Volga from above; from the upper square of the monastery there is a magnificent view of the Volga....

==== Bishop Seraphim ====
In January 1878, Bishop Seraphim took over the cathedra of Samara. Having familiarised himself with the monastery's own resources, he found them unsatisfactory for the monastery's existence. In order to remedy the situation, he ordered the Iveron Monastery to issue 3-4 books for the collection of donations, instead of 1-2, as it had been done before. In 1880 the monastery received from the state treasury 55 dessiatinas of convenient arable land 20 versts from Samara.

Having celebrated the liturgy in the wooden monastery of Iveron, under the impression of its dilapidation and incompatibility with the capacity of the influx of worshippers, Seraphim suggested to the abbess that she take care of the construction of a warm stone church as soon as possible, promising her every support in this endeavour. He himself chose the site for the church, after having visited all the possible sites several times. Together with the monastery, he proposed to build a new three-storey abbatial building next to it, so that the abbess could receive various representatives of the ecclesiastical and civil authorities worthy of her position in a manner worthy of her position. Finally, Seraphim, together with the architect, took an active part in drawing up a plan for the construction and façade of the temple, and gave the monastery 5000 roubles in bonds, donated to it for this purpose by an unknown benefactor.

Preparations for the construction began in the early spring of 1882. The site indicated by the bishop was a hill with a precipice of about 10 fathoms. This hill was to be excavated and the slopes of the neighbouring hills were to be enclosed with a stone fence to prevent them from sliding, as well as places for an open gallery around the future temple, on which a procession could be held. Such volumes of earthworks significantly changed the landscape of the entire central space of the monastery.

The foundation stone of the church was laid on 29 June 1882. The construction was supervised by the architect Inostrantsev with the participation of a special commission of two monastery priests and the economist of the bishop's house Sophrony. Thanks to the generous donations of benefactors and the collections from the cord collection books, the funds for the construction were quite sufficient, and in 1884 the masonry of the temple was ready. However, on 18 May, after the scaffolding had been removed, the columns supporting the ceiling and dome of the temple collapsed with it, as they had been incorrectly calculated and proved to be too thin. The side walls of the temple were also damaged in the collapse. None of the builders were injured. Construction was suspended for almost a year and resumed in April 1885 under the supervision of the same Inostrantsev and, after his death in 1886, the diocesan architect T. S. Khilinsky, according to new, more refined plans. In 1886, the stonework was completed, and the interior decoration began. On 5 June 1888, Bishop Seraphim consecrated the main altar of the church in the name of the Iveron Icon, and on 29 June — the side chapel. Like his predecessor, Seraphim often celebrated services in the monastery church, which he had helped to build. Throughout his tenure on the Samara Cathedra, he held divine services in the Iveron Church on the 3rd day of Easter, on the day dedicated to the Iveron Icon, on the days of the Apostles Peter and Paul, in whose honour the side chapel in the Sretensky Church was consecrated, as well as on 12 April and 12 October, on the feast days of the Iveron and Jerusalem Icons, if they fell on a Sunday. Among the archdiocesan services held in the monastery we should mention the annual commemoration of the first administrator of the monastery, the Archpriest of the Cathedral I.G. Khalkolivanov in 1883, the funeral of the Abbess Margarita in the same year, and the funeral of the Rector of the Theological Seminary I. I. Tretiakov in 1887.

On 21 June 1887, Serbian Metropolitan Michael visited the monastery and blessed the visitors.

On the 8th of September in 1889 a girls' church school was opened in the convent. The governor A. D. Sverbeyev and the mayor P. V. Alabin took part in the opening ceremony. The school was housed in a special building next to the bell tower. The first teacher was a graduate of the Samara diocesan school L. N. Rapidova, the teachers were well-known priests, singing was taught by the monastery deacon. At the beginning 85 girls studied at the school, in 1899 their number increased to 100. The first final examination in 1890 was attended by Bishop Seraphim.

==== Bishop Vladimir ====
Under the new bishop of Samara, Vladimir, the first all-night vigil under the primacy of the bishop was held in the monastery on the occasion of the feast of the Samara diocesan women's school. In addition, he obliged the monastery to use only candles produced by the diocesan candle factory, but part of the cost was compensated by the monastery supplying the factory with luminescent paper for candle wicks. At the bishop's suggestion, the convent also took in several girls who had been orphaned during the cholera epidemic of 1893.

In March 1891, the monastery unexpectedly received a large piece of land. The honorary citizen of Samara, Vasily Golovachev, who had once financed the construction of the iconostases in the monastery churches, but had not been connected with the monastery for more than 20 years, bequeathed to the monastery in perpetuity 450 dessiatinas, and to the monastery parish another 50 dessiatinas of good arable land 70 versts from Samara, near the Chagrinsky convent. One of the monastery farms was located on this land. The parish first leased its land to the monastery for 75 rubles a year and then exchanged it for 2000 rubles of untouchable capital in 1% securities.

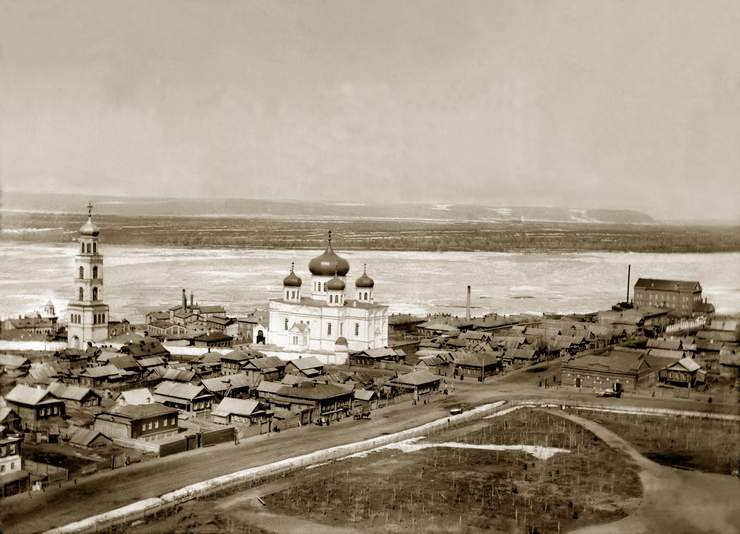
View of the monastery from the cathedral in construction

On 28 July 1891, at the meeting of tsesarevich Nicholas Alexandrovich in Buzuluk, Abbess Antonina presented him with an icon of the Theotokos of Iveron, embroidered in gold in the monastery's workshops, and a towel with a picture of the Iveron Monastery embroidered on its ends. On 3 January 1892, Antonina died of tuberculosis, two ecumenical funeral services for her were held by Samara Bishop Vladimir (Bogoyavlensky). The nun Theophany became the new abbess, who was soon raised to the rank of abbess.

==== Bishop Guri ====
Bishop Guri continued the tradition of archdiocesan services and wanted to support the monastery. The number of worshippers and donations decreased, so he proposed an increase in burial fees: 250-500 rubles in the lower cemetery, 1000-2000 in the upper cemetery. He also extended the practice of housing orphans, including girls from Old Believers' families, but it was soon abolished. In 1898, after a fire, the bishop imposed strict fire safety measures.

On 27 July 1894, John of Kronstadt visited the monastery and held a holy water service. In 1894, A. K. Kerova (nun Maria) was transferred here, but suspecting secret contacts with the followers, she was sent to the Suzdal monastery in 1897. Later, the Conversation was recognised as an acceptable direction of Orthodoxy.

Alabin died in 1896, and his widow erected a monument and a church in memory of her daughter. In 1898, 11 nuns were transferred to the Shikhobalovsky Convent, whose first abbess was Mastridia.

At the beginning of the 20th century, the convent had 3 churches, 22 residential buildings, a school, workshops and various services. In 1899, a fire damaged the building, but it was restored and given to a strange shelter. In 1908, Abbess Theophany was replaced by Abbess Seraphima.

During the World War I, the monastery housed a hospital, and workshops sewed clothes for soldiers free of charge.

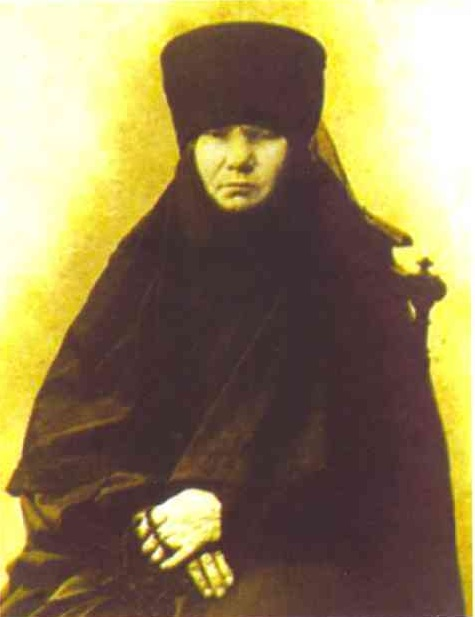
Nun Maria (in the world Anastasia Kerova)

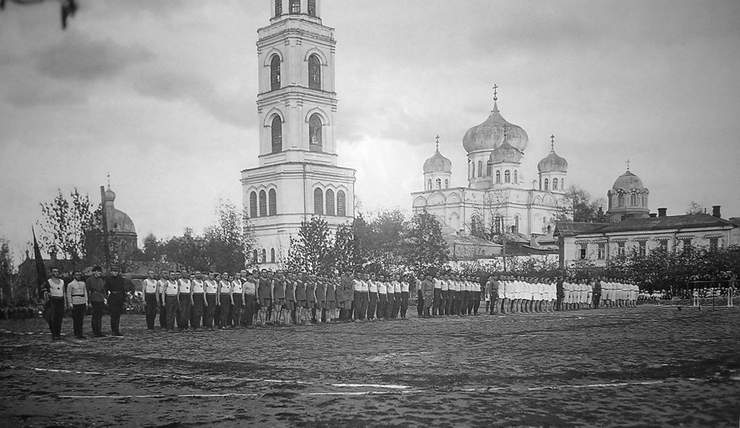
View of the Iveron Monastery in Soviet time

==== Under the Soviet regime ====
In 1919, the convent was officially closed, but a sewing workshop was established on its site and the believers community was registered, which received the monastery churches at its disposal. Most of the residential buildings were occupied by the apartments of the workers of Vodosvet and the factory Metalist, the nuns lived in the remaining buildings until 1929; since August 1919 they were obliged to pay rent at the same rate as other citizens.

In March 1922, by order of the Samara Provincial Executive Committee, all the valuable things were removed from the convent: the precious vestments of the particularly venerated Iveron and Jerusalem icons, the cross, a large ark, a silver chalice, ten icons, two lamps and other things. The deed of transfer of the valuables from the monastery to the Gubfinotdel was signed by the treasurer Manefa.

In 1925, the monastery was closed and the workers of the Zhigulyov brewery and the nearby Samara State District Power Plant moved into the residential buildings, creating the so-called workers' town. In the same year the Iveron Church was closed and in 1926, the wooden side chapel of the Jerusalem Church was demolished. In 1929, the other three churches of the monastery were closed. In 1930, the bell tower, the fence and many buildings of the monastery were demolished. The monastery cemetery was ruined, the crypts destroyed and the graves damaged. Only the tomb of Peter Alabin remained. In 1987 it was declared a historical and cultural monument. The remaining buildings housed various organisations.

There is a folk legend, which has no documentary evidence, but appears in the story of the Samara writer A. Solonitsyn Gates of Heaven, that the last nuns of the convent were loaded onto an old barge, which was then sunk on the Volga.

==== The Monastery Revival ====
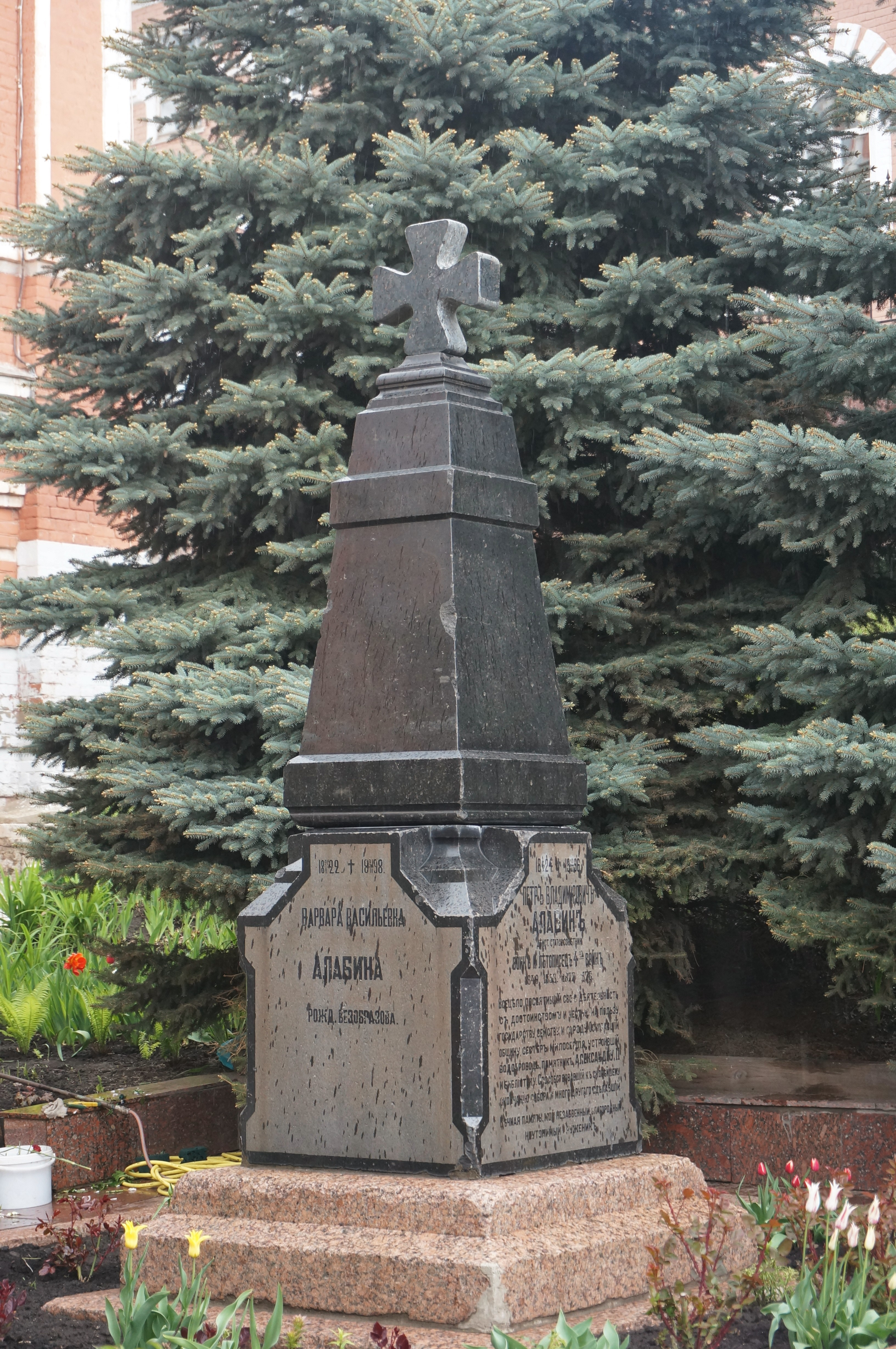
The grave of Pyotr Alabin

On 13 February 1992, the administration of the Samara diocese obtained the transfer of the refectory of the Jerusalem Church and other remaining monastery buildings to the Russian Orthodox Church. By the decision of the Head of the Samara Region Administration of 27 March 1992, the Church of the Iveron Mother of God, the refectory church, the abbess's house, the monastery workshops and the necropolis were recognised as historical and cultural monuments of regional significance. In October 1992, worship began in the refectory church. Design work on the restoration of the Iveron Temple began.

In August 1994, by the decree of Patriarch Alexy II, the monastery was headed by Abbess Ioanna, 12 nuns lived in the monastery. Later, the territory of the monastery was extended. In 1995, the territory of the former labour camp was transferred to the monastery, where a church dedicated to the Holy Spirit was built. In October 1999, the monastery was visited by Patriarch Alexy II, who presented an image of the Theotokos of Jerusalem. In 2001, the relics of Alexander Chagrinsky were transferred to the monastery. The monastery has workshops and a library.

At the beginning of the 21st century 65 inhabitants lived in the monastery, among them 3 nuns, 10 nuns, 22 nuns, 30 novices; in the almshouse — 8 people. On 26 October 2010 the 160th anniversary of the monastery was celebrated, the solemn service was presided by Archbishop Sergius with Archbishop Alexis and Bishop Iriney.

On 13 October 2011, a chapel was consecrated in the name of the new royal martyrs Nicholas II and his family. On 14 June 2012, a fire broke out in the bell tower under construction, which was quickly localised. In 2013, electronic carillons made in Moscow were installed on the restored bell tower.

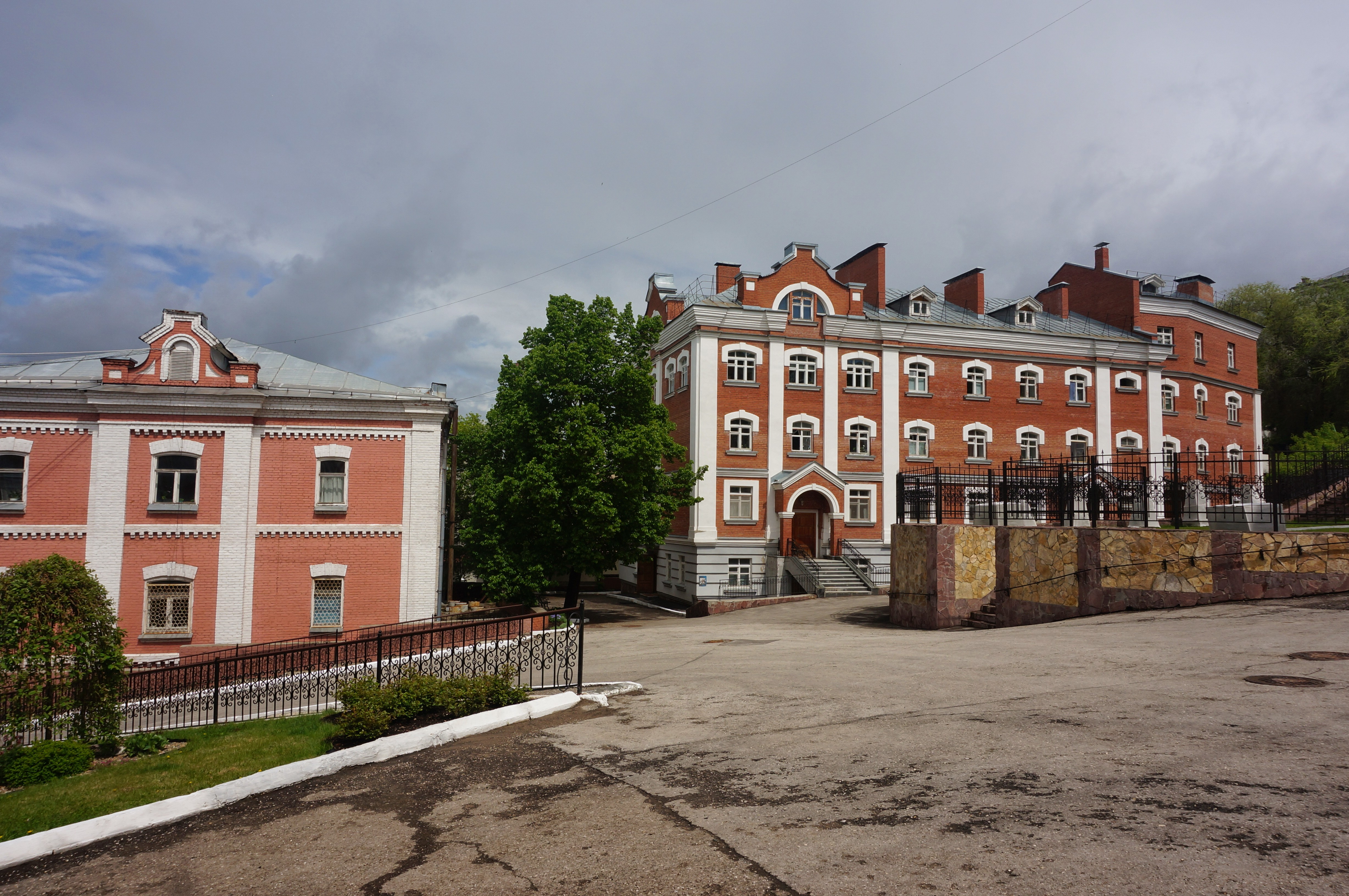
The cell building and the building of cells and craft workshops

== Property ==
=== Area ===
The monastery was located on a steep slope on the left bank of the Volga, occupying almost 7 dessiatinas of land. It was surrounded on all sides by a high whitewashed stone wall with four towers in the form of chapels at the corners. The road running through the area from the Holy Gate to the Exit Gate divided the area into two unequal parts — the larger one on the top of the hill, the smaller one at the foot.

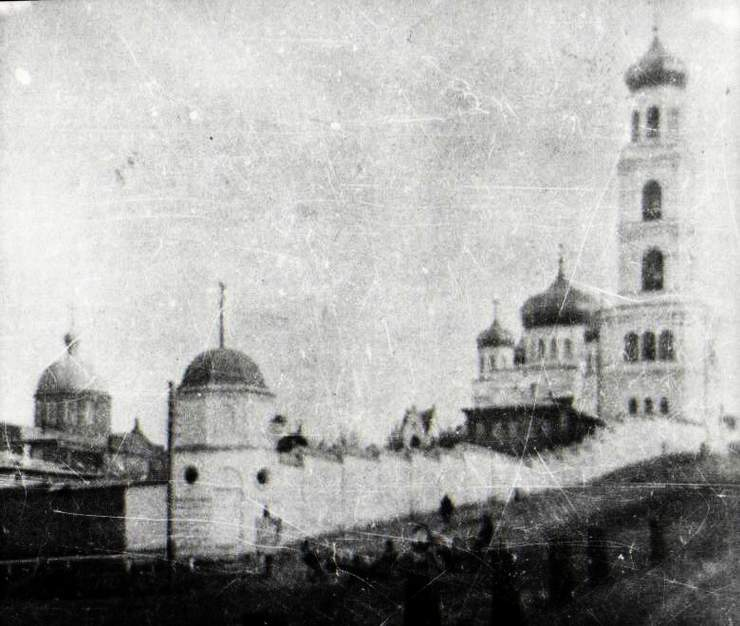
From left to right: the dome of the Church of Iveron, the corner tower of the chapel-shaped wall, the Sretensky Church, the bell tower.

In 1905, there were 22 buildings on the territory with dimensions from 3 to 15 fathoms in length and from 3 to 8 in width. Some of the buildings were made of stone: two one-story, two two-story, two three-story buildings, and two other wooden buildings were made of brick. Other buildings were wooden, two three-story and the rest two-story, built on stone foundations, covered on the outside with yellow and brown tar, plastered on the inside, and roofed with iron. The buildings were located both in the upper and lower part of the monastery, rather symmetrically.

There were two monastic cemeteries located on a steep slope. They were accessed by stone steps fenced with wooden railings. The entire area not occupied by buildings or cemeteries was carefully planted with various trees and flowers.

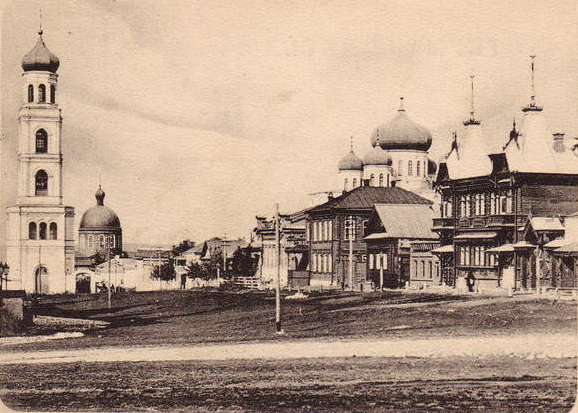
Monastery of the Theotokos of Iveron

There was a school, a hospital, and a strange house on the grounds. There was a water supply system that supplied water from a well to the building of the abbess, the prosphora, the hospital, the bathhouse, the laundry, as well as to the house of the clergy, which was located at the corner of Alexandrovskaya and Saratovskaya Streets. Some land plots outside the monastery fence, but adjacent to it, were also the property of the monastery, transferred to it with the help of donations from their owners.

Besides the manor, the monastery owned more than 1130 dessiatinas of land, of which 835 were plowed, 150 were meadows, 120 dessiatinas on the right bank of the Volga were occupied by forest and limestone, 23 dessiatinas by orchards. On these lands 4 farmsteads with dwellings and household services were built. On one of them, near the orchard, there was a beehive, and on the other there was a horse-mill.

After the death of Abbess Antonina, despite the huge expenses for the construction of new and the reconstruction of old monastery buildings, the monastery had 20 thousand untouchable capital in securities, the interest of which it could dispose of. At the beginning of the 20th century the monastery had almost 42 thousand rubles of untouchable capital.

Not the least of the monastery's income came from rents for the use of the monastery's lands. Most of the land was leased, the monastery itself used only one hundred tithes of land for plowing, orchards and forests. Meadows with lakes were leased for fishing, limestone for quarrying. The monastery's workshops also provided income.

=== Temples ===
==== Wooden warm Cathedral of the Theotokos of Iveron ====
The first temple in the monastery was a warm wooden three-prestolnyaya church, consecrated April 24 (according to other sources, April 24, completed and consecrated April 27,) 1855, the first Samara Bishop Eusebius on behalf of the Theotokos of Iveron. The church was built under the supervision of the architect Firsov, stood on a high stone foundation, was oblong in shape, was 11.5 fathoms long and 6 fathoms wide. It was clad with tar and covered with iron. It had 13 windows of 2 arshin in height and up to 1.5 in width, but as it was shaded by hills on both sides, it was rather dark.

The iconostasis was a two-storeyed carpenter's work with gilded carving on a white background. It was made at the expense of the Samara merchant Vasily Golovachev. On the left side of the royal gates there was the Iveron icon, and behind the left choir there was the Theotokos of Jerusalem.

In 1857, the northern side chapel was built and consecrated on June 15 in the name of the Jerusalem Theotokos by Bishop Theophilus. It was placed under the church of the Monastery of the Theotokos of Iveron, in the northern half of its foundation. It was cramped, low and dark: with dimensions of 2 by 5 fathoms, height of one fathom and with windows facing north, one in the altar and three small ones in the side chapel.

The southern side chapel was built on the money of the prominent Samara citizen P. V. Alabin and consecrated in 1874, in the name of the Helena and the Great Martyr Barbara — in honor of the patron saints of his daughter Helena Lappa, who died of tuberculosis, and his wife Varvara Vasilyevna. The side chapel was attached to the southern wall of the Iveron church, which slightly increased its width. The iron roof with a small dome with a cross went from the roof of the main temple to a sloping platform. Along the southern wall there was a balustrade with two ledges, one to the road leading to the temple, the other to the cemetery. With the appearance of the side chapel the interior of the temple became more spacious and brighter. The two-storey iconostasis of the side chapel became a continuation of the iconostasis of the main temple, but smaller. Its description has been preserved: "The iconostasis of this aisle church with cross-shaped, radiant and gilded gates was a very skillful work; artificial green ivy was spread on it. The local icons of the Savior and the Theotokos were wrapped in green cloth and appeared as if confirmed in niches. Under the icon of the Theotokos, there was a porcelain monogram with letters: E. L. In small triangles above the royal gates, north and south, were exhibited porcelain vases with artificial flowers and with crosses gilded in shining, coming out above the vases. In the center of the temple, two more columns were added to the previous four, on which the new dome rested". The church was built on a new dome.

The temple festivs were celebrated on January 12 in the main throne, on May 21 in the Helen-Varvarinsky Aisle, and on October 12 in the Jerusalem Aisle. It existed until 1901, after which it was dismantled due to dilapidation, but the Helen-Barbarinsky aisle was preserved and was dismantled only in 1926.

==== Sretensky or Dormition Cathedral ====
In 1858, the abbess of the community, Maria Yanova, petitioned Bishop Theophilus for the construction of a large stone cold church with three domes in the name of the Presentation of the Lord. The petition was accompanied by a construction plan drawn up by the provincial architect K. G. Maker in 1856, and approved by the Department of Projects and Estimates of the Main Administration of Roads and Public Buildings. The composition of the temple and the characteristic Russian-Byzantine style show that in his project Maker used drawings from the album of K. N. Ton, published twice in 1841 and 1844, as a model for widespread use and imitation. On September 17, 1858 the ceremony of laying the temple took place. The construction was carried out under the supervision of K. G. Maker.

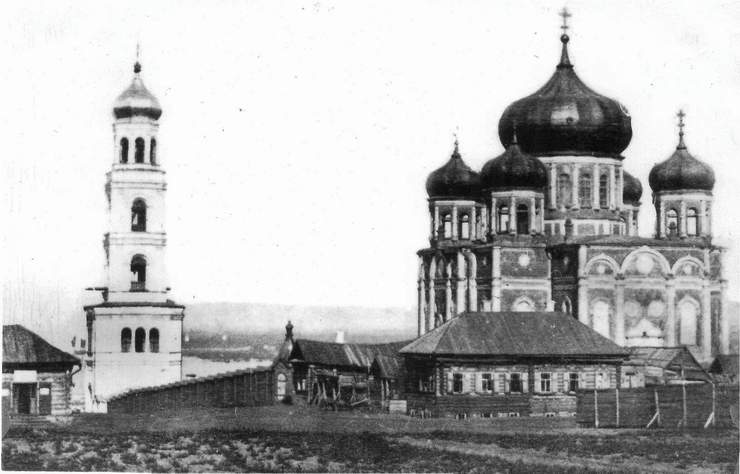
The Sretensky church and the monastery bell tower. View from Alexandrovskaya Street

The temple was built on the highest point of the monastery grounds. At the beginning the construction was quite fast: already in November 1861, the walls were finished, in the spring of 1862 the crosses were raised and installed. However, the process of interior decoration was so slow that the construction lasted 11 years. The construction of the temple was carried out on the donations of Samara merchants: a large sum was donated by the mayor merchant Vasily Bureev, Ivan Pleshanov allocated 10 thousand rubles and arranged two iconostases, the main and in the northern side chapel. The icons in the side-chapel were painted by N.M. Safronov, a painter from the village of Palekh, at Pleshanov's expense. Safronov also painted icons for the main iconostasis at the expense of another merchant, Alexander Nadyshev. The iconostasis and the face icons in the southern aisle were financed by the merchant Vasily Golovachev, the crosses on the five pear-shaped domes were commissioned by the merchant P. Zhuravlevlev.

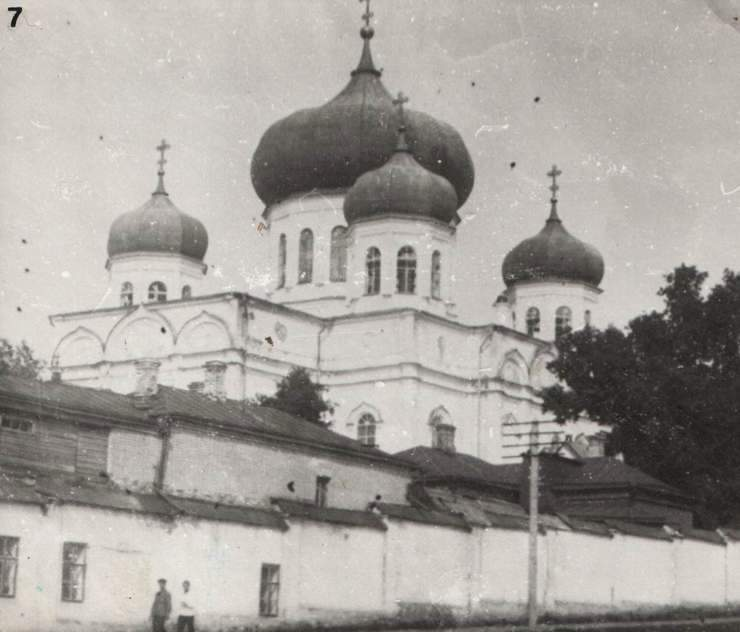
Dormition church of the Iveron Monastery

On September 17, 1867, Bishop Gerasimus consecrated a side chapel in the name of the Holy Apostles Peter and Paul. Divine services started to be carried in the temple. Then the main altar was built and consecrated by Bishop Gerasim on September 8, 1869. In the early 1890s, the church needed major repairs and interior renovations, although at that time the construction had not been completed and the third side chapel had not been consecrated. The repairs lasted from 1894 to 1896. During this time, the interior decoration was almost completely changed. The Samara master P. F. Bychkov did the carpentry and gilding of the iconostases, columns, carvings of the stomachs, cornices, clerestory walls, kiosks and other things. I. V. Belousov carried out painting works on restoration of icons, painting and painting of walls, ceilings, domes, etc. The construction of the temple ended with the completion of the third side chapel and its consecration in the name of St. Sergius of Radonezh on July 30, 1896.

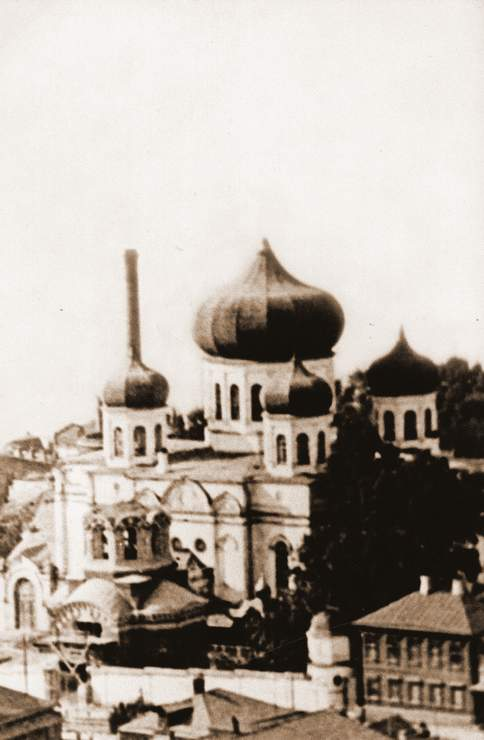
The Assumption Church of the Iveron Monastery under Soviet rule. The crosses have already been removed

Before the construction of the Samara Cathedral, the Sretensky Temple was the most majestic architectural structure in the city, but even later it remained the highest temple in the city. The temple had a cruciform shape with five chapters, among which the central one was particularly large. The vaults rested on six beautiful columns. Its length was more than 20 fathoms, the width more than 15, and the height up to 20 fathoms. The temple had three entrances made of white stone: from the west, north and south, each had 17 steps (according to another version — 16). There was a cellar under the building, in the northwest part of which the first abbess, Abbess Margarita, was buried. The windows in the temple were rather unusual in shape and arrangement, the largest, the lowest being two fathoms high in the choir and three in the temple itself. Besides, there were twelve other large windows in the dome, which made the Sretensky temple the brightest of all the churches in Samara. The doors were two-winged, lime-grid doors in the temple and solid oak doors at the exit.

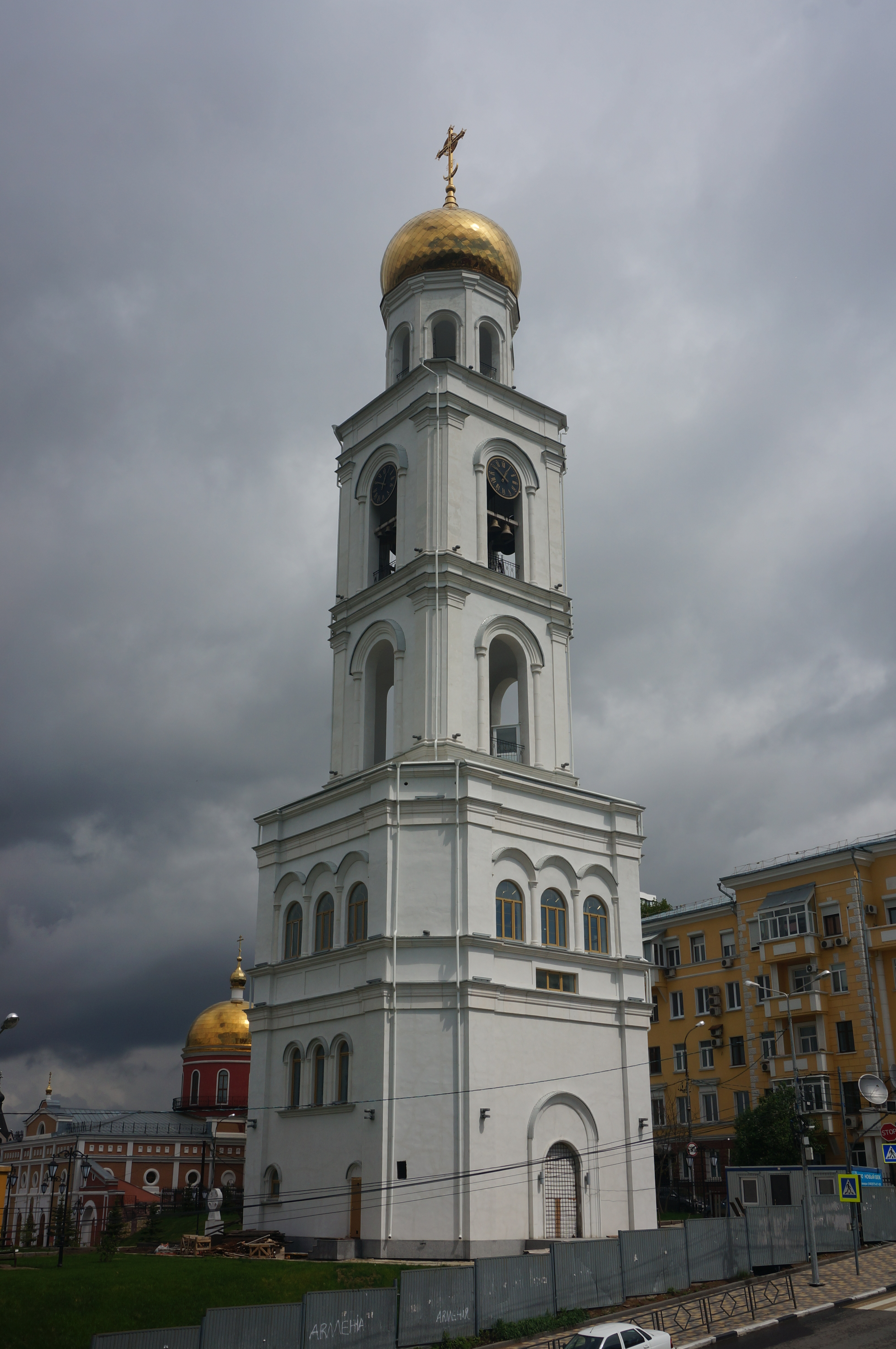
Restored bell tower

Temple holidays were celebrated on February 2 in the throne, on June 29 in the Peter and Paul aisle and on September 25 in the aisle in the name of Sergius of Radonezh. However, to celebrate the throne feast in February in the unheated temple was rather inconvenient, the idea of rebuilding the temple into a warm one was abandoned because of the difficulty and cost of heating such a large building. Therefore, the main throne was reconstructed and on May 9, 1902 Bishop Gury consecrated it in the name of the Dormition of the Mother of God, and presented to Abbess Theophany an exact copy of the icon of the Kyiv Pechersk Lavra, which was later placed on the high altar.

The temple was closed in 1929 by the presidium of the regional executive committee. At first it housed the garage of the society Transportnik, and in 1930 the temple was blown up, and in its place was built a residential house.

==== The Bell Tower and St. Nicholas Church ====
The bell tower of the monastery was built from 1877 to 1882.

The project of the bell tower was created by the provincial architect Maker when the project of the Sretensky temple was created in 1856. Then it was assumed that the belfry would be 40 fathoms high. However, in St. Petersburg in the department of projects and estimates of the Main Directorate of Railroads and Public Buildings it was noted:

As for the project of the bell tower: it was intended to be raised to a height of 40 fathoms, which may require an expenditure of about 95 thousand rubles, the department, not approving this project, found it necessary to remake it in 2 types, as shown in the submitted significant projects, according to which, in order to ensure the reliability and stability of the construction, the size of the bell tower in general and in particular its height by 10 fathoms, so that the implementation of a new project on this subject may require a sum of up to 40 thousand rubles.

Construction began twenty years later. The stone belfry 30 fathoms high with a 500-pound bell was located above the main gate of the monastery, crowned with a dome and a gilded eight-pointed cross 3 fathoms high. Its construction was financed by Ivan Vasilievich Zhukov and other benefactors. More than 10,000 rubles for the casting of the bell and the gilded cross were donated by the St. Petersburg merchant I. P. Nenyukina. The bell of 5410 poods weight was cast in the factory of the Yaroslavl merchant Olovyashnikov and delivered to the monastery in August 1881. The cross was ordered from the Moscow master Abramov, delivered to the monastery in September 1880.

In the middle level of the bell tower there was a small gate church in the name of St. Nicholas the Wonderworker. 1000 rubles for its construction were bequeathed by the captain of staff N. N. Lobanov, who was treated for tuberculosis in Samara, and the noble couple Alasheyevs in memory of their deceased son Nicholas. Alasheyevs also donated to the temple an old family icon of St. Nicholas, throne and altar vestments, church veils and other valuable items. The total amount of donations to the temple even exceeded the estimated cost of its construction.

In 1882, the church was consecrated with the blessing of Bishop Seraphim by the hegumen of the Buzuluk male monastery, Hieromonk Nifont. The feast of the throne was celebrated on December 6.

=== The warm stone Iveron church ===
At the beginning of the 1880s, the warm wooden church was already dilapidated, it was small and did not meet the needs of the monastery. Therefore, in 1882, a new church was consecrated in the name of the Iverskaya icon of the Mother of God.

The project was designed by the Samara architect P. A. Inostrantsev with the participation of Archbishop Seraphim. Inostrantsev supervised the construction until his death in 1886, after which he was succeeded by the diocesan architect T.S. Khilinsky.

Significant funds for the construction were donated by the merchant Nenyukova (née Sinyagina). Construction lasted six years, June 29, 1887 were raised crosses[112], June 5, 1888 was consecrated the main throne, June 29 of the same year — the side chapel in the name of Archangel Michael. The cathedral was located in the middle of the road monastery descent, on its right side, adjacent to it the entrance to the porch. On the north side of the temple adjoined stone three-story abbess building, standing facade in the direction of the descent from south to northwest and separated from the temple corridor.

The temple had a quadrangular shape with a length without 15 fathoms parvis, with a porch of 19 fathoms and a width of 12 fathoms. It was covered with iron and painted with copper. In the center there was a stone octagon with a dome with ten windows. The dome was covered with white iron and crowned with a gilded copper cross. On the four sides of the temple were placed four small chapels, also covered with white iron and crowned with copper-gilded crosses of corresponding size. The height of the temple was 12 fathoms with the dome and 15 fathoms 2 arshin with the cross. However, its height was covered by the surrounding hills, so it looked like a cave temple, half hidden in the ground, and only the facade, upper parts, domes and crosses protruded to the surface of the earth.

There were 10 doors leading into the temple, 6 of which led from different sides to the porch, and four double doors leading into the temple itself. The doors were carpentry, pine with oak finish. On the western side of the temple there was a porch in its entire width with terraces of white stone with a blind lattice of white stone and exits on two sides. On the northern side there was a staircase with 4 steps, on the southern side — with 11 steps. Around the temple there was also an open stone gallery three fathoms wide into which two doors led from the temple.

The cathedral was lit by windows arranged in two levels. It was divided into three parts by bare stone walls. The eastern and western parts were 4 sazhens long and 11 sazhens wide, the central part was 10.5 sazhens long and 11 sazhens wide. Above the eastern and western sections were the sacristy and library rooms. In the western part of the middle section, between the porch and two columns, there was a choir supported by a cast-iron column. In the eastern part, in the center, was the high altar, to the south was the altar dedicated to St. Michael the Archangel, and to the north was the choir, from which a passage led to the sacristy. The altar and the side chapel were separated from the main altar by stone walls with passage doors. Opposite all three compartments there was a 5.5 arshin wide ambo with four steps of white stone. The floor in both altars and in the porch was made of wood, in the whole ambon — parquet, in the center of the temple and in the porch — stone.

The altars and the pontoon were separated from the church by oak iconostases with wooden ligature and gilding. Their author was the Simbirsk master Pyotr Sibiryakov. The main iconostasis had three tiers: the lower tier was 6 sazhen and 1 arshin wide and 1 sazhen high, the second tier was 4 sazhen 2,5 arshin long and 1 sazhen 1,25 arshin high. In the middle of the lower tier were the royal gates, 4.25 arses high and 2.25 arses wide. The Annunciation of the Blessed Virgin Mary and the four Evangelists were depicted on them. The main iconostasis was crowned with a four-pointed gilded oak cross 1.25 arshin high.

The side-altar iconostases had two tiers, the lower one was 1 fathom and 5 quarters high, the upper one — 1 fathom. The width of both tiers in both iconostases was 2 fathoms and 2 quarters. In the center of these iconostases there was a royal gate 3.5 arshin high and 1 arshin 7 versts wide, also with the image of the Annunciation and the Evangelists. The aisle iconostases were crowned with the same crosses as the main iconostasis. The icons on all three iconostases were painted in the Byzantine style, on lime boards on a chiseled gold background with oil colors. The author was the Palekh iconographer N. M. Safronov. The altar icons were of similar appearance and workmanship.

In the center of the altar there was a throne of cypress with a vestment of white silver glaze. The altar was made in a similar way. In 1929, by the decision of the Presidium of the Regional Executive Committee, the church was given to the Metalworkers' Association. Later it housed the Branch No. 1 of Samaraoblobuvbyt. In 1995, the temple was returned to the Iberian community.

==== Jerusalem church ====
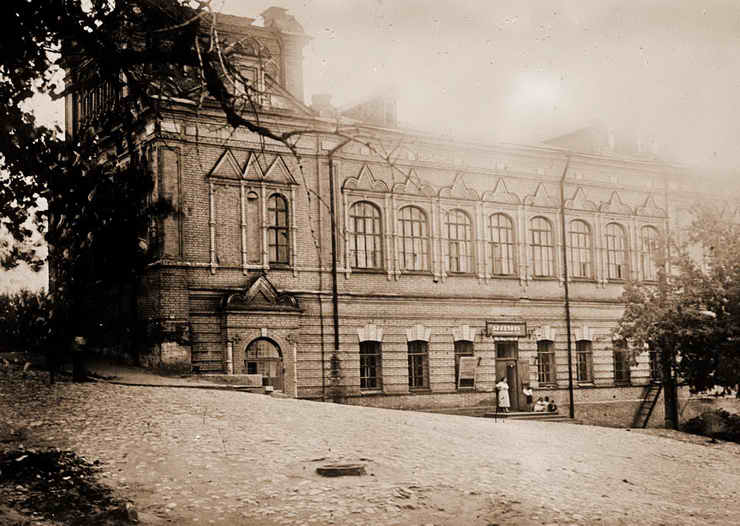
Refectory church in 1930s

In October 1900, Abbess Theophany appealed to Bishop Guri of Samara for permission to build a new refectory church on the occasion of the monastery's fiftieth anniversary. Guri left a resolution:

I grant permission to build a refectory church in the place of the existing wooden Iverskaya church on the occasion of the anniversary of the Holy Monastery, but not wooden, but stone, in honor of the Theotokos of Jerusalem, so much glorified by God with miraculous signs and wonders.

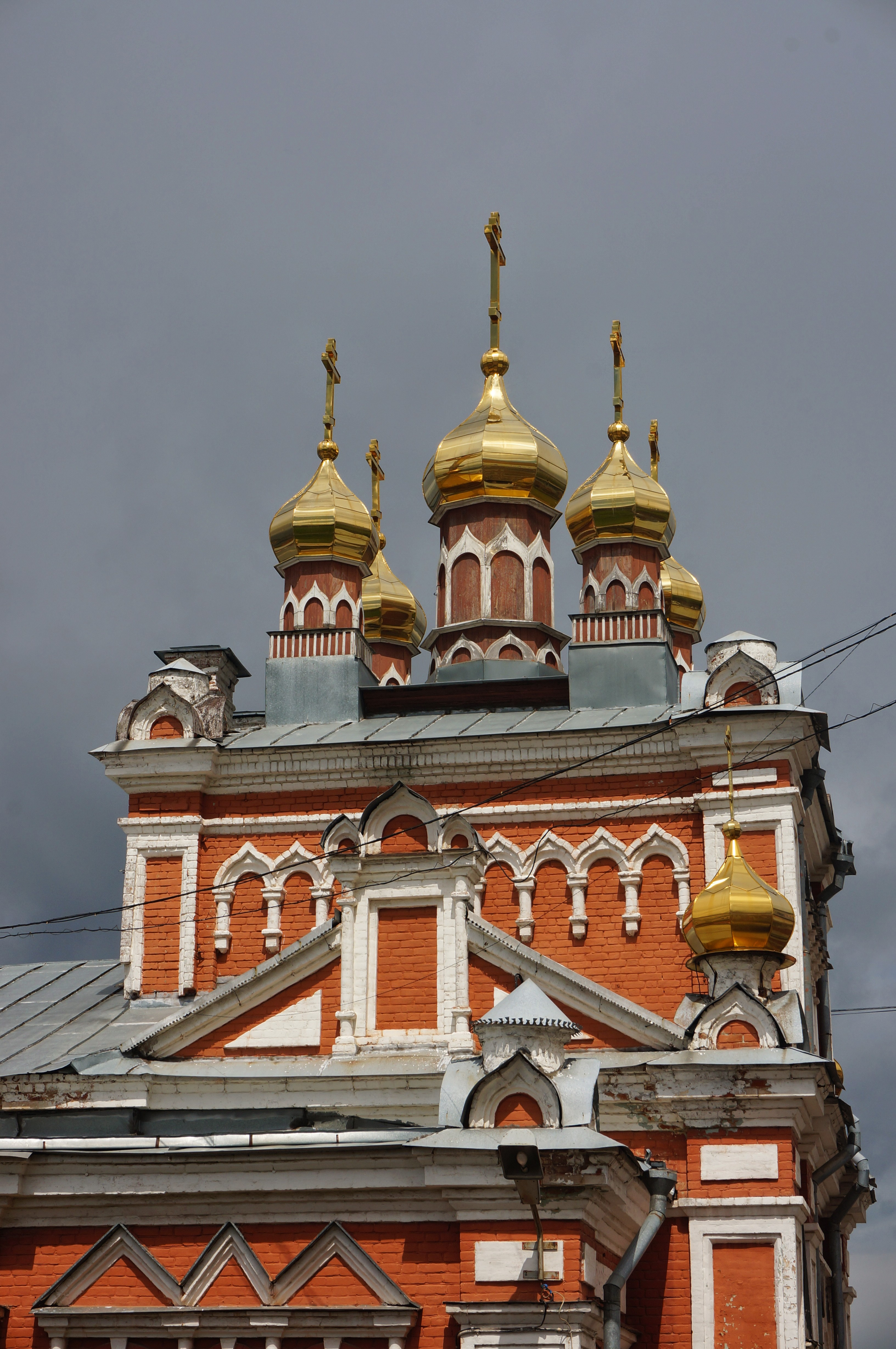
The Jerusalem temple's domes

On 5 July 1901, a new church was consecrated. In the place of the altar a wooden cross was erected, in the foundation of the apse holy relics were placed, which covered a copper plate with the engraved date of the consecration. The construction was carried out according to the project and under the supervision of the architect of the Samara diocese, T. S. Khilinsky.

The temple had a nine-domed completion. On the lower floor there was a bakery, kvassovarnya and crypts for graves, on the upper floor — refectory church with a throne in the name of the Theotokos of Jerusalem, the Nativity of St. John the Baptist and St. Theodosius of Chernigov.

The consecration took place on September 21, 1903. A side chapel of the new church was built from the remains of the former aisle in the name of Queen Helena, Equal to the Apostles, and the Great Martyr Barbara. Throne feasts were celebrated on December 4 in the main throne and on May 21 in the side chapel.

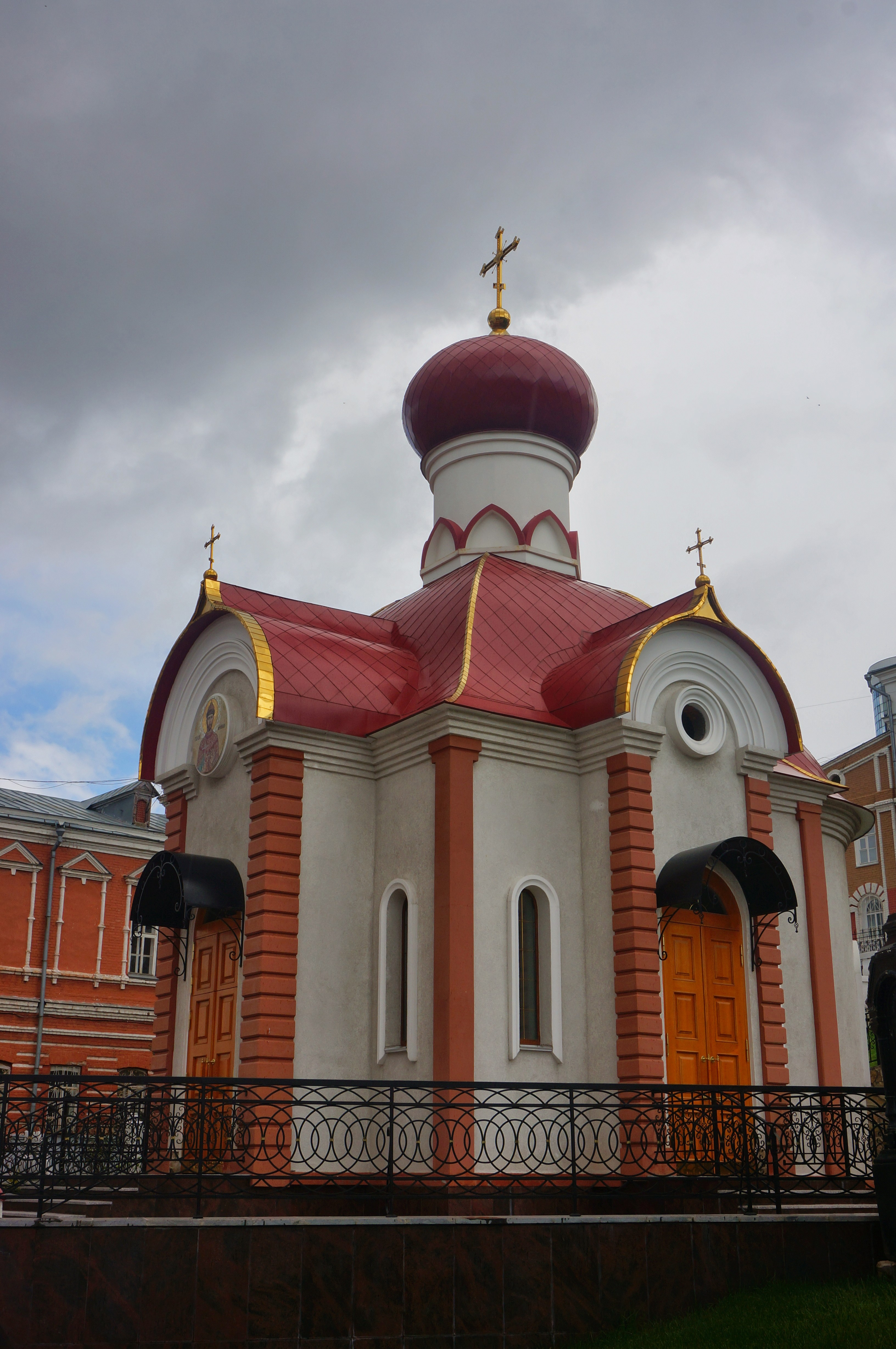
Chapel of the Royal Passion-Bearers Church

In 1925, the church was closed, the building housed a watermen's club, later used as the House of Science and Technology. In 1992, the building was transferred to the Russian Orthodox Church, and the church was reopened, becoming the first in the revived monastery.

==== The Chapel of the Royal Passion-Bearers Church ====
In 2006, the construction of a new chapel in the monastery began. However, during the preparation of the foundations, the remains of the monastery's necropolis with many burials were discovered. Archaeological excavations were carried out, and the names of some of the buried were restored.

The construction of the temple-chapel continued in 2010. On 13 October 2011, the chapel church was consecrated in the name of the royal new martyrs Nicholas II and his family. It is a small one-domed brick church-chapel in the Russian style. The temple was built at the expense of the regional budget. In its altar the earth of the alleged place of murder of the royal family is bricked up. A memorial plaque commemorating their martyrdom was installed. In the future under the temple it is planned to open a museum of restoration of the complex of the Iveron monastery.

=== Chaples ===
In 1850 the community built a chapel on the bank of the Volga River to collect donations for the monastery. It was a wooden building with the dimensions of 2×2,5 fathoms, covered with tar, with a wooden roof and a wooden cross covered with white tin. In one half there were icons of Christ the Savior, the Kazan Mother of God, St. Nicholas the Wonderworker, St. Seraphim of Sarov and others. In the other half there was a Dutch oven and one or two nuns who guarded and supervised the chapel.

Despite its purpose, it did not bring any particular financial benefit. At the end of 1903 and the beginning of 1904, rumors began to spread in the city that the relics placed in the chapel had a special healing power. Although the monastery leadership was skeptical about such rumors, they appealed to Archbishop Gury with a request to allow Akathist prayers by the monastic priesthood with monastic singers in the chapel. He not only allowed and blessed it, but also obliged the parish to perform such prayers at the request of those who came to the chapel.

Another chapel for the collection of donations was located in the Trinity Market, but it existed for a relatively short time. It is known that in 1892 a chapel of the Trinity Church of Samara was built in the market, while the monastery chapel no longer existed.

On 5 September 1876, in the area of the railway station (at the crossroads of the present Sportivnaya and Krasnoarmeiskaya Streets) a stone chapel was erected. The chapel was built in memory of the successful end of the famine of 1873-1874 in the diocese. It was built according to the project of the architect N. I. Rochefort. Money for the construction was collected by subscription from the whole province, a significant amount was contributed by P. V. Alabin. The chapel was consecrated by Bishop Gerasim on April 9, 1877, the day when the volunteers left the station for Serbia. Inside the chapel there were three icons of St. Petersburg icon painters: an icon of the Savior (how the Savior fed 5,000 people with five loaves of bread); the Theotokos of Iveron icon; an icon of St. Alexis, Metropolitan of Moscow and All Russia, considered the heavenly patron of Samara. In the mid-1920s, the chapel was demolished.

On 8 June 1888, a wooden chapel of St. Alexis was erected to commemorate the 900th anniversary of the Baptism of Russia. It was located at the corner of Naberezhnaya and Aleksandrovskaya Streets near the Strukovsky Garden. In 1913, it was replaced by a stone chapel. It was also destroyed in the 1920s.

=== Relics ===
In the monastery there were special icons:

- Jerusalem Theotokos in a silver gilded ribbon, which Simbirsk Bishop Theodotius blessed the monastery at its opening. This image on solemn and festive days was carried to the homes of the townspeople. At the beginning of the 20th century the image was valued at 800 rubles. It was honored as a miracle-working, presumably, the first abbess kept a list of miracles that occurred from the image, but already in the early 20th century monastery clergymen could not find any reliable records of it.
- Panagia Portaitissa, It was donated by the merchant E. S. Marikhina at the foundation of the monastery, after which it was named. The icon was in an expensive golden frame, decorated with diamonds and emeralds. At the beginning of the 20th century the icon was valued at 2000 roubles.
- Trojeručica. The icon was painted in Athos on a cypress panel and was brought to the monastery on October 27, 1862. It was decorated with a silver-gilt frame and was valued at 1200 rubles at the beginning of the 20th century.
- Icon with the image of the monk fathers: Martyr Savva, Agapite, Nicodemus, Veniamin and Arsenius with the tombs in which the relics of these saints were enclosed. The relics were donated to the monastery in 1867, by Anisya Holometskaya, a court counsellor who moved from St. Petersburg to Samara for residence.
- Tikhvinskaya Theotokos, painted in 1790, in a silver frame and with a silver crown of 5×5 quarters.
- The Gospel in silver-gilt plates, estimated at the beginning of the 20th century at 700 rubles.
- A silver-gilt crucifix of 96 gold pieces.
- The same cross with the relics of St. Matthew the Evangelist.
- A silver-gilt casket weighing more than 8 pounds, in the shape of an altar, with the Royal Gates on the front.
- A four-pointed silver-gilt cross with the relics of John the Baptist, Euthymius the Great, John the Damascene, St. George the Victorious, St. Joseph, St. Arsenius, St. Roman the Sweet, St. Pancrasius the Martyr. Pancras the Martyr, St. Alexander Nevsky, St. Tatiana the Martyr, St. Gury, St. Eustratius, St. Mardarius, St. Eugene, St. Euxentius, St. Panteleimon, St. Basil the Great, St. John Chrysostom and others. The cross was enclosed in an icon in a ciot with the image of some of the listed saints and with a copper-gilt plate with the list of saints whose relics are kept in the cross.

== The monastery order ==
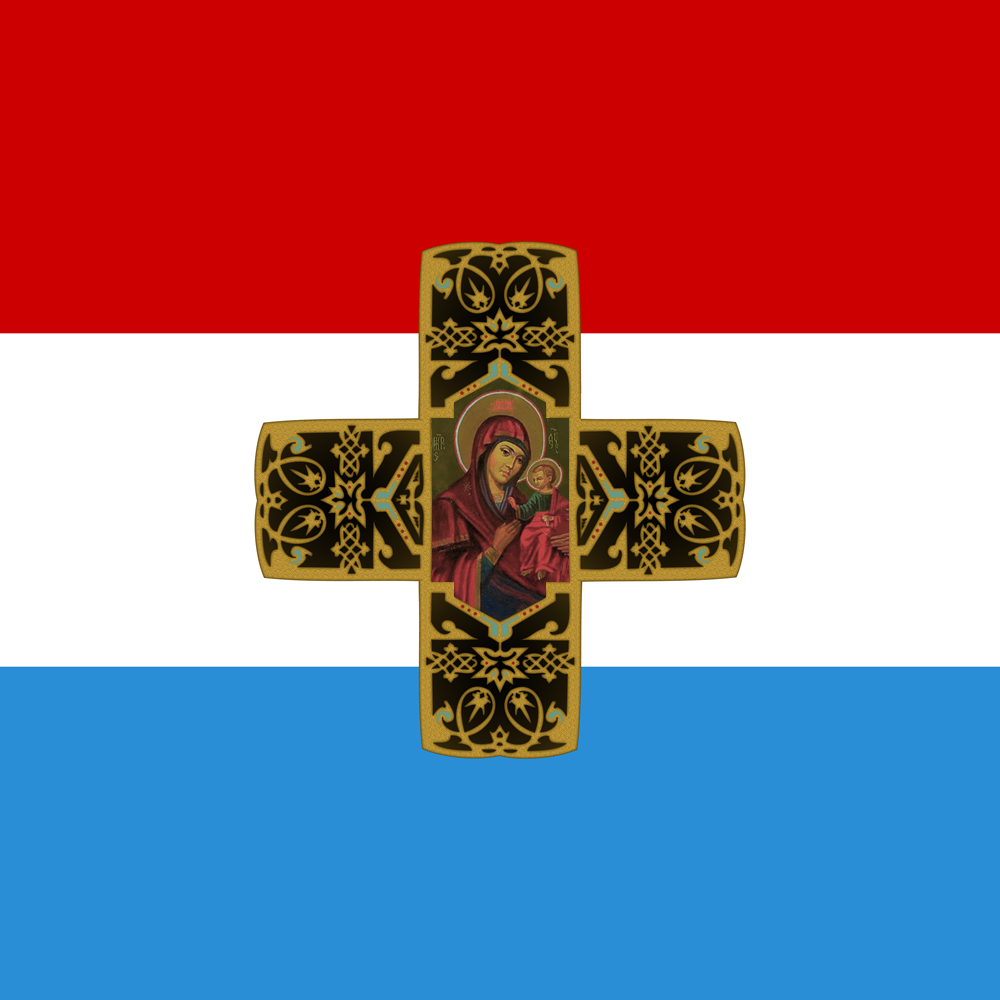
Samara flag

The nuns devoted most of their time to communal, ecclesiastical, and domestic prayer. All, except the sick and the elderly, had certain duties: reading the Psalter, making wafers, preparing food for the common meal. Many were engaged in various handicrafts: sewing church vestments, various lay and monastic garments, gold embroidery, quilting blankets, bookbinding, icon painting, weaving, carpet making, and others.

In 1876, the monastery workshop embroidered the famous Samara Banner, under which the Bulgarian Volunteer Corps fought during the Russo-Turkish War. Now the banner is kept in the National Museum of Military History of Bulgaria in a separate room with special conditions and under high security, it is the only banner awarded with the Order of Bravery of the Republic of Bulgaria, which was later placed in the richly decorated top of the flag pole. The modern flag of Samara Region, adopted in 1998, was based on the Samara banner.

The nuns devoted their free time from community service to raising funds for their personal needs: they were obliged to pay for heating, lighting, and clothing from their own resources. All went to confession and received communion during all fasts. In addition, since 1866, a hieromonk was appointed for the confessions of the confessors.

The Iveron Monastery was also famous for its choir, which was led by Semyon Fedorovich Solovyov, a graduate of the Samara Theological Seminary. All his life he was devoted to the improvement of the choir singing. After his death he was buried in the monastery cemetery.

== Residents ==
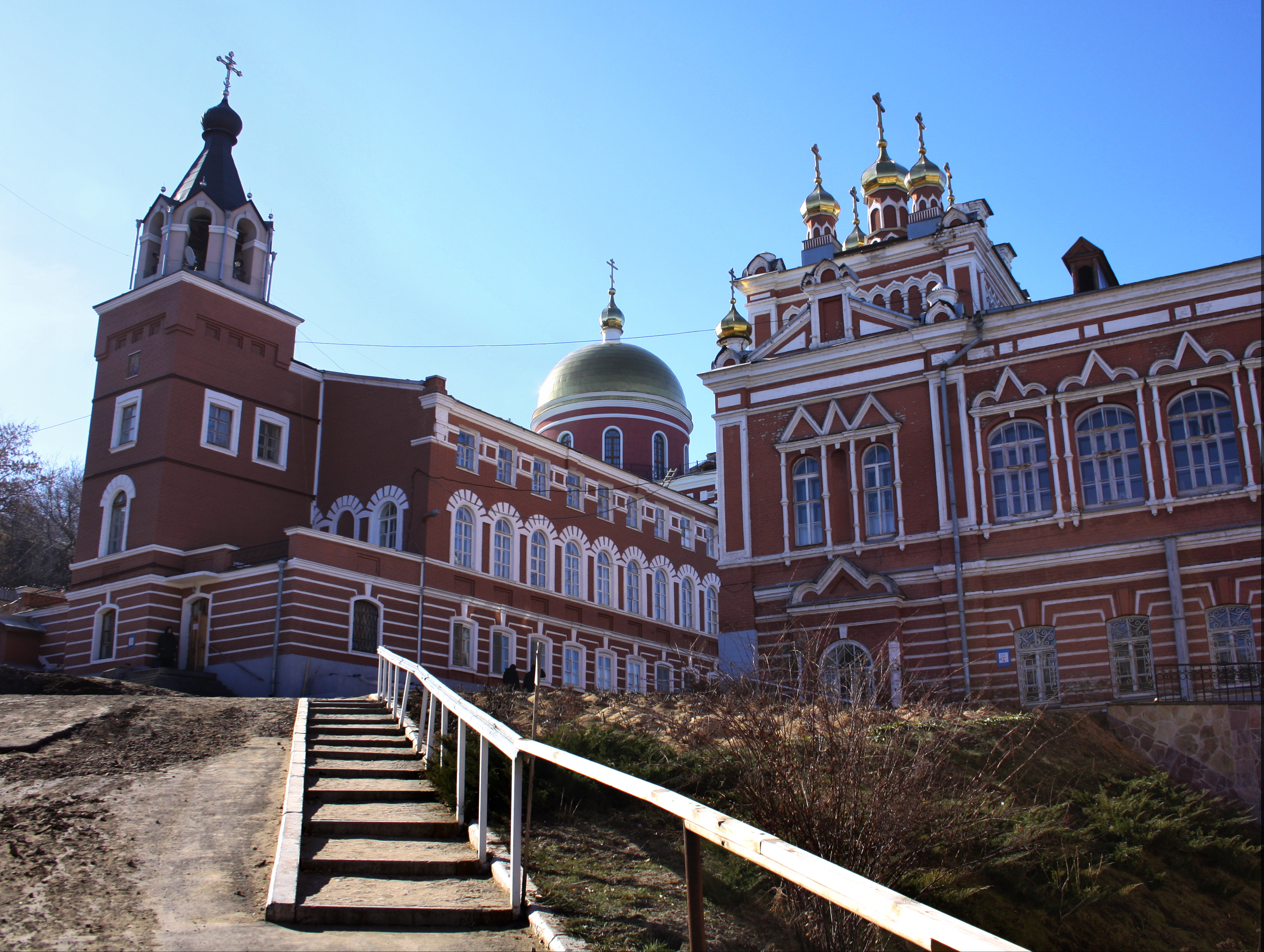
The Iveron Monastery

When the convent was founded, there were 30 residents. A few years later, in 1857, there were already 125 people living in the convent together with the abbess. After that, the number of residents increased constantly. If in 1860 there were 190, in 1861 the convent had 217 people, and in 1876, there were 270 people in the convent.

At the beginning of the 20th century, there were about 400 people in the convent, from 10 to 100 years old. The last exact figures refer to 1916: 439 nuns, including 2 abbesses, 2 nuns of the Great Schema, 98 manatee nuns, 187 cassock novices, 150 decree nuns.

Some of the nuns brought their underage relatives with them. The convent also took in orphan girls. All these girls lived under the strict control either of their relatives or of guardians appointed by the convent.

From 1850 to 1894, there were only two ways to become the nun of the Great Schema in the convent, one secret, the other before her death. In 1894, Bishop Gurius made two more tombs. The schema-monastics lived in separate cells in the stone Iveron Church. For the constant reminder of death in their cells there were prepared coffins. They lived in seclusion, without the right to visit other cells or go beyond the monastery fence, eat the harshest food and spent the main time in prayer in the temple and in the cell, partaking of the holy mysteries every two weeks.

=== Abbesses ===
The first abbess of the congregation was Maria Yakovlevna Yanova. She came from the bourgeoisie of Samara. From 1850 to 1855, she held the rank of head nun, and after the official approval of the community — the rank of abbess. In 1860 she took the monastic tonsure with the name of Margarita and was raised to the rank of abbess. For her service she was repeatedly honored with the gratitude of the diocesan authorities and the blessing of the Holy Synod; in 1866 she was awarded the Pectoral Cross.

In August, 1874, she retired, as she could no longer devote sufficient time to the affairs of the monastery due to the complete loss of strength. For her residence she was given a wooden outbuilding with a brick and iron roof, with heating and lighting at the expense of the monastery, and a pension of 200 rubles a year. She died on April 24, 1883, at the age of 78. She was buried in the crypt of the Sretensky church. After her death there was no property left, and she bequeathed the accumulated money for the casting of the bell and gilding of the iconostasis.

Since September 1874, the monastery was governed by Abbess Antonina. She came from a family of priests and was baptized with the name Anastasia. She married priest Rozaliev, but a year later she was widowed. In 1853, she entered the community, was tonsured under the name of Augusta, and in 1870 was given the habit with the monastic name of Antonina. She became abbess at the age of 45, having previously served as sacristan and treasurer. On January 3, 1892, Abbess Antonina died of tuberculosis. She was buried under the floor of the central part of the stone church in the name of the Theotokos of Iveron, opposite the side chapel of the Archangel Michael.

From January 28, 1892 to September 1908, the convent was headed by the nun Theophany (in the world Anastasia Matveevna Nemertsalova), who was elevated to the rank of abbess on April 7, 1892. The daughter of a priest, she married the priest Nemertsalova, was widowed in 1878 and went to a convent. In 1879, she was tonsured to the cassock and in 1889 to the mantle, before she was elevated to abbess, she performed the obedience of the treasurer. In May 1894, she received a pectoral cross from the Holy Synod, and in June 1899 - a golden pectoral cross with decorations from the Imperial Cabinet.

In 1908, Theophany was dismissed from her post and succeeded by Abbess Seraphima (in the world Anastasia Vasilyevna Milovidova), who led the monastery until 1916 (according to other sources — until 1917). A niece of Abbess Antonina, also a priest's widow, she was tonsured in 1889, was a correspondent under Abbesses Antonina and Theophany, and taught needlework at the convent school.

In August 1994, by the decree of Alexis II, Abbess Ioanna (in the world Lyudmila Ilyinichna Kapitantseva) was appointed abbess of the monastery. At the age of 24 she took the monastic dignity in the Holy Protection Krasnogorsk Krasnogorsk Convent, from where she was transferred to Samara. She served in the monastery till November 22, 2020. Since March 30, 2021, nun Theodosia (Timasheva) has been the senior sister of the convent. On August 24, 2023, nun Lubov (Chusova) was appointed abbess.

=== Nuns ===
There were other notable residents of the convent. One of the first to be baptized in the convent was the nun Dorothea. She came from the merchant class. In 1860, at the age of 39, she was tonsured, and until 1864 she was a superior. In 1864, she became abbess of the Buguruslan women's community in 1867, — abbess, abbess of the Buzuluk women's convent. In 1870, she fell ill and returned to the Iveron convent. She died in 1901.

Also in 1860, the nun Nymphidora, a peasant, was tonsured. She had been a member of the community since its foundation in 1850. Since 1858, she baked wafers and delivered them not only to the convent but also to other churches in Samara. In 1867, she built a stone building of 5 by 7 fathoms, covered with iron, with a separate yard and all the facilities for the production of prosphora, from the storehouse for flour to the storehouse for finished products. This caused a conflict with the abbess, which resulted in the clarification of the Samara Ecclesiastical Consistory that "the baking of prosphorae and their sale to the churches should be done in the name and for the benefit of the monastery, and not at all for the benefit of the prosphorni". In 1885 she moved to Jerusalem, where she later died.

The nun Susanna (in the world Marina Vasilyevna Grishina) was widely known. She came from the bourgeoisie, entered the convent in 1856, was tonsured in 1870, and had the duty of collecting donations. She was very diligent and earned the nickname Bee. She had a way with everyone, with her allegorical speech she was able to give good advice, guidance, and to make not only Orthodox but also non-Orthodox people donate. Till her old age she collected donations in the houses of the townspeople, on the docks and at the railway station, and every month the monastery received a hundred and more rubles. For her work she was repeatedly blessed by the leadership of the diocese and the Holy Synod. She died in 1897 at the age of 90 and was buried in the monastery cemetery.

Nun Sophia, a native of Samara, who entered the convent in 1859, and was tonsured in the mantle in 1879, was housekeeper and treasurer of the Klyuchegorsky convent, then treasurer of the Iveron convent, and later became abbess of the Rakovsky convent.

Nun Callista, formerly a citizen of Samara, entered the convent in 1853 and was tonsured in 1877. During almost half a century of her stay in the convent, she performed the duties of a statutor, regent, was in charge of the sacristy, library and treasurer. Then she became the hegumen of the Buguruslan Pokrovsky Monastery.

=== Monastery staff ===
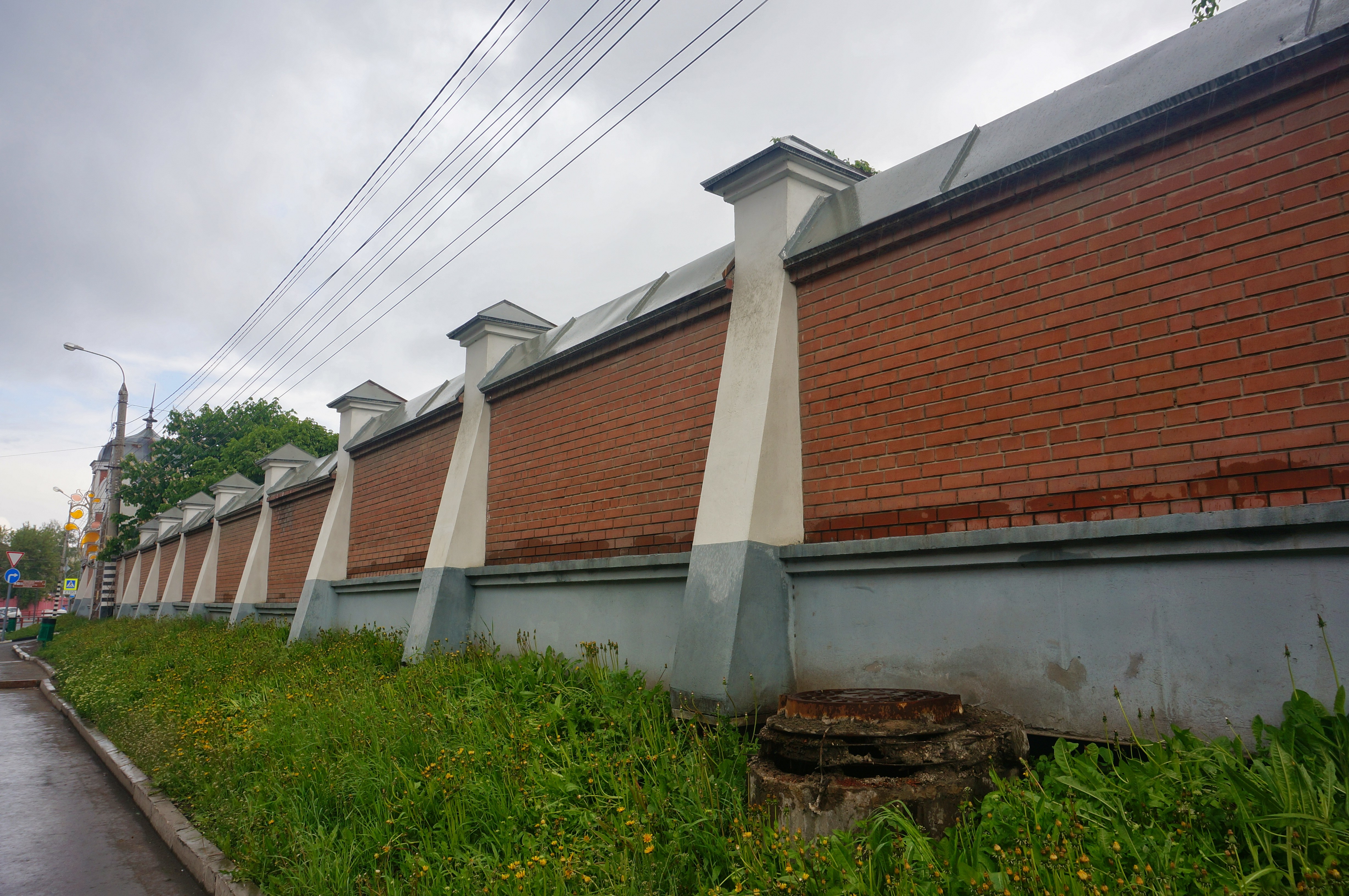
Modern monastery fence

After the consecration of the first monastery church in 1855, the monastery staff consisted of one priest and one deacon. After the consecration of the side chapel dedicated to the Theotokos of Jerusalem in 1858, another priest was added to the staff. In 1862-1866, the monastery had two priests and two deacons, one of whom was a psalmist. In 1867-1870, the staff consisted of two priests, one deacon, and one psalmist, but in 1871-1874, it returned to the previous staff of two priests and two deacons, one of whom was filling the vacancy of a psalmist. Since 1874, only one deacon remained on the staff. In 1884-1889, there were three priests, two full-time and one part-time, and one deacon. The supernumerary priest was a teacher of law at the local grammar school, he could conduct the liturgy at will, but he had no right to use the fraternal income. In the years 1890-1895, the parish again consisted of two priests and two deacons, one of whom was a psalmist. In 1896, the staff of the monastery priesthood was increased to three priests.

The changes in the staff were mainly due to the unevenness of the funds for the maintenance of the priory, because since the opening of the monastery the priory gave a subscription that the funds for its maintenance are sufficient, and it will be maintained without outside help. And although the securities of the inviolable capital at the beginning of the 20th century for the priory was already 30 thousand rubles, but inflation, the increase in the number of members of the priory from two to five, the reduction of the income of the priory from donations in the temples, from crosses, the reduction of the time of communication of the monastery priests with the townspeople because of the various duties assigned to them by the consistory. The reduction of the number of burials in the monastery cemetery and the consequent reduction of the various commemorations led to the fact that the income of the members of the priesthood was very meager and its multifamily representatives were practically poor. In order to increase the income, it was even necessary to rent as apartments some rooms in the three two- and three-storey houses belonging to the priory.

Among the famous priests of the monastery we can mention Dimitrii Nikolaevich Orlov, later professor of the Samara Theological Seminary, archpriest of the Samara Cathedral, writer, author of numerous descriptions of monasteries and churches of the diocese. Also in the monastery served the son of Bishop Gerasim, Konstantin Dobroserdov, as a deacon and later as a second priest.

In total, during the first fifty years of the monastery's existence, 35 priests and churchmen were replaced.

=== Cemetery ===
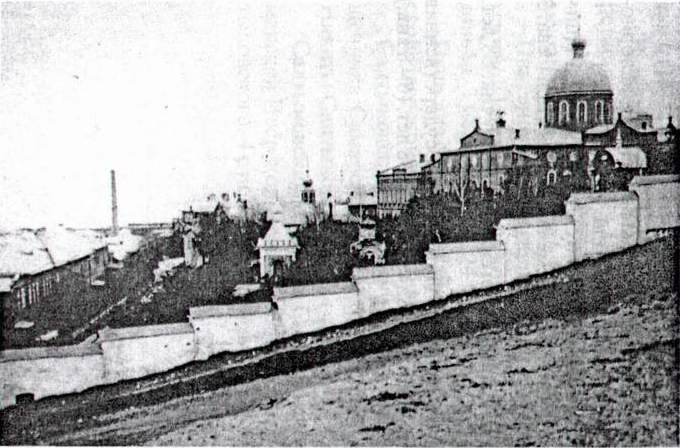
View from the south side, the chapels over the graves can be seen behind the stone ledge wall

For many years there were two monastery cemeteries on the territory of the monastery. Near the Sretensky church there was the "upper" cemetery, where mainly clergymen were buried, and between the refectory church and the fence on the south side there was the "lower" monastery cemetery, which first appeared in the 1850s, when the monastery was still a community.

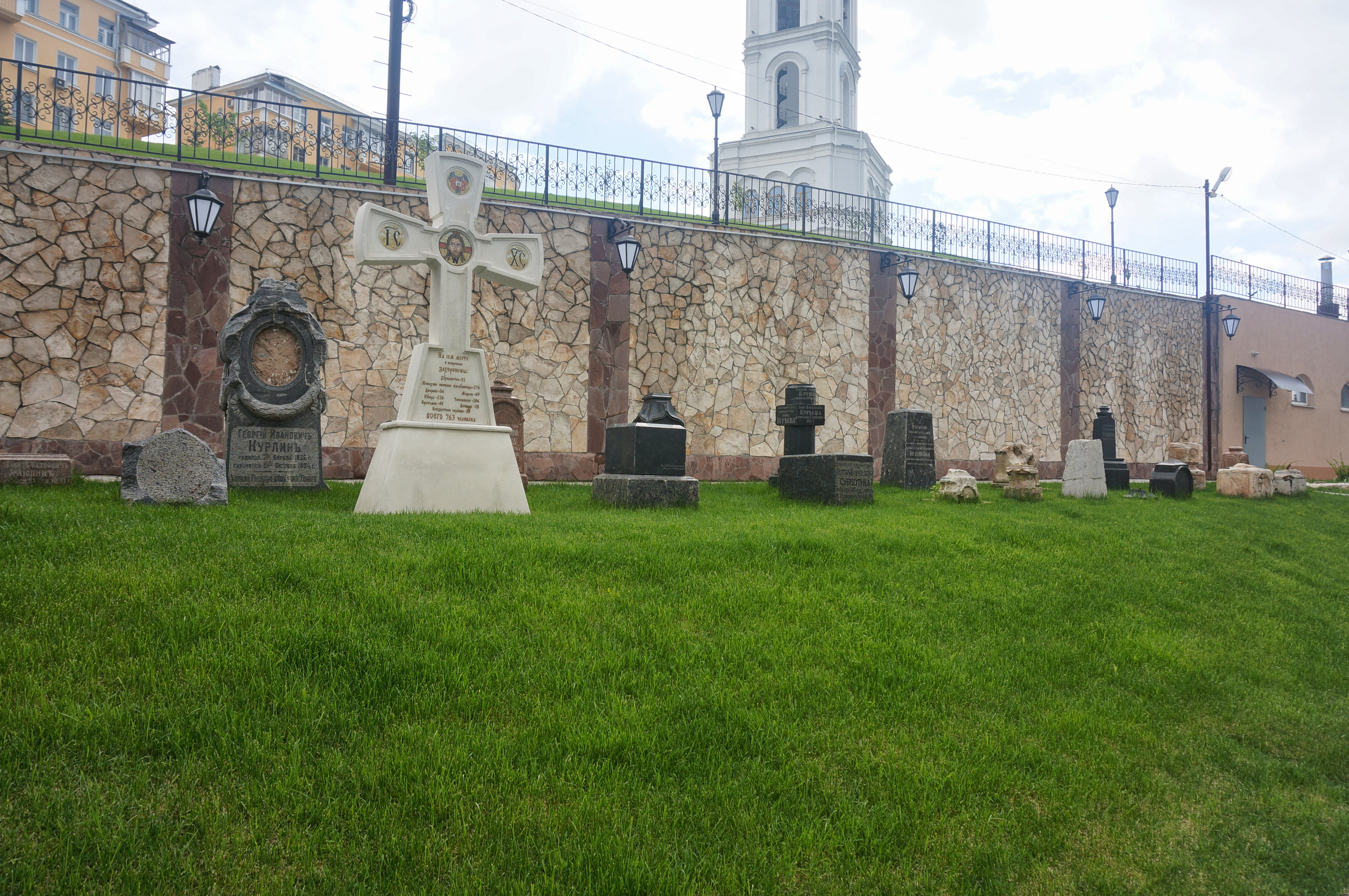
Part of the restored necropolis

Over the graves and crypts various monuments and chapels were erected. For example, a majestic mausoleum was erected over the tomb of the merchant D.V. Kirillov, who died in 1894 and was buried in the upper cemetery. In the cemetery not only distinguished citizens of Samara, but also representatives of other classes: bourgeois and peasants found their last resting place. About one sixth of the buried people were children under 10 years of age. After the monastery was closed in the 1920s, the cemetery was also closed. In the early 1930s, many of the monastery buildings were demolished, and the cemetery suffered. The crypts of the clergymen in the upper cemetery were opened, their ashes were "reburied", the cemetery was covered with earth, and now there are houses there. A public toilet and a garbage dump were built in the lower cemetery. A part of the crypts was used as a cellar. During the World War II some of the barns and crypts on the territory were used to make blanks for mines. There are known cases when some of the tombstones and monuments were removed from the cemetery, reassembled and placed on other graves with new names.

Some of the documents related to the monastery necropolis were lost, but after the restoration of the monastery at the end of the 20th century, the recovery of the burial data began. By 2001, 593 names of those buried in the monastery were known, and it was believed that there were about 700 burials in the cemetery, of which only the grave of P. V. Alabin and his wife survived. Other graves were believed to have been opened and destroyed. However, in 1996, during construction work, a number of burials were discovered at a depth of up to 5 meters. For several years, archaeologists were engaged in protection and rescue work. It was discovered that although the graves were without grave markers, not all of them had been opened, and some of them were found in the crypts, which helped to identify the burials. Various metal objects peculiar to the burials were found, such as crosses, buttons, metal parts of coffin decoration, and in one of the burials a beautiful icon of the Theotokos of Iveron in a gilded frame was found — all this was collected and given to the monastery archives. The discovered remains were first transferred to the monastery and later buried in the crypt next to the chapel. In the course of the work it was found out that on the territory of the Iveron necropolis there were about a thousand burials, about 750 names of those buried there could be established.

== Bibliography ==
- Blok V. S., Katrenko K. A. (2002). Монастыри Самарского края (XVI—XX вв.): Справочник [Samara Region Monasteries (16th-20th cc.): Handbook] (in Russian). Самара: Самарский Дом печати. pp. 73–79. ISBN 5-7350-0350-X.
- Ogudina, N. (2002). Чагринский батюшка: жизнь и служение протоиерея Александра Юнгерова, а также история Чагринского Покровского и Самарского Иверского женских монастырей [Father Chagrinsky: the life and ministry of Archpriest Alexander Yungerov, as well as the history of the Chagrinsky Pokrovsky and Samara Iveron nunneries] (in Russian). Самара: Иверский женский монастырь. p. 93. ISBN 5-85234-180-0.
- Archpriest Georgy Tretyakov (2001). Опыт исторического исследования в путях Промысла Божия в судьбе Самарского Иверского женского монастыря в период 50-летнего существования его от возникновения в 1850 г. до настоящего времени [Experience of historical research in the ways of the Providence of God in the fate of the Samara Iversky Nunnery in the period of 50 years of its existence from the emergence in 1850 to the present time] (in Russian). Самара. p. 175.
- Zubova O. V., Melnikova N. V., Radchenko O. I., Bochkov V. A., Podmarirsyn A. G. (2001). Православные святыни Самарского края [Orthodox shrines of the Samara region] (in Russian). Самара. pp. 12–27. ISBN 5-85234-166-5.
- Moskovsky, O. V. (2001). Некрополь Иверского женского монастыря [The Theotokos of Iveron Necropolis] (in Russian). Самара: Книга. p. 77. ISBN 5-243-00005-1.
- Самарский Иверский женский монастырь: К 160-летию основания обители [The Samara Monastery of the Theotokos of Iveron: Toward the 160th Anniversary of the Monastery's Founding] (in Russian). Самара: Самарская епархия РПЦ. 2010. p. 120. ISBN 978-5-89850-147-1.
- Alabin, P. V. (1877). Двадцатипятилетие Самары, как губернского города. (Историко-статистический очерк) [Twenty-fifth anniversary of Samara as a provincial city. (Historical and statistical sketch)] (in Russian). Самара: Издание Самарского статистического комитета. pp. 123–129.
