= Kizichesky Monastery =

Orthodox monastery in Kazan, Russia

Coordinates: 55°49′20″N 49°05′22″E

Kizichesky Vvedensky Monastery
- Кизический Введенский монастырь
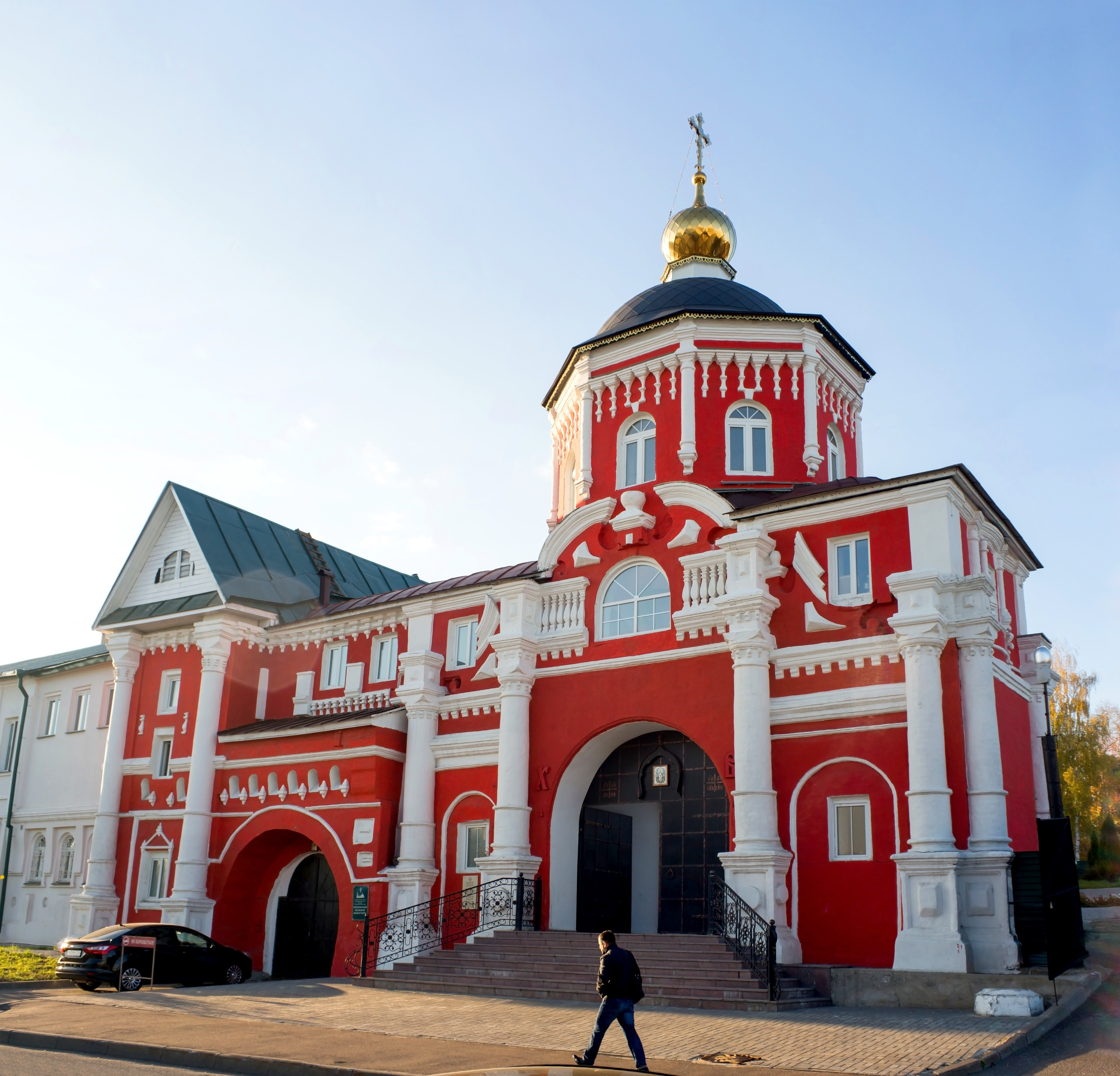
- The gate church dates from the 1690s
- Interactive map of Kizichesky Vvedensky Monastery

Monastery information
- Denomination: Orthodoxy
- Established: 1691

Architecture
- Country: Russia, Kazan

Kizichesky Vvedensky Monastery (Russian: Кизический Введенский монастырь) is a Russian Orthodox male monastery in Kazan, Tatarstan.

The monastery was founded in 1691 (335 years ago) by Patriarch Adrian of Moscow, who had been Metropolitan of Kazan and Sviyazhsk between 1686 and 1690. It was dedicated to the Nine Martyrs of Cyzicus (Russian: Девять мучеников Кизических, Dyevyat muchenikov Kizicheskikh), relics of which were translated to the new monastery on Adrian's instructions.

In the 1690s Vvedensky Cathedral (Presentation of Mary Cathedral) and Vladimirskaya Church (Church of Vladimir Icon of Virgin) were built. Vvedensky Cathedral was destroyed during the Soviet period.

Count Ilya Andreyevich Tolstoy (the grandfather of Lev Tolstoy) is buried in the monastery.
