= Klyuchegorsky Kazan Mother of God Monastery =

Women's Orthodox defunct monastery in Russia

- Monastery of the Theotokos of Iveron
- Ключегорский Казанско-Богородицкий монастырь
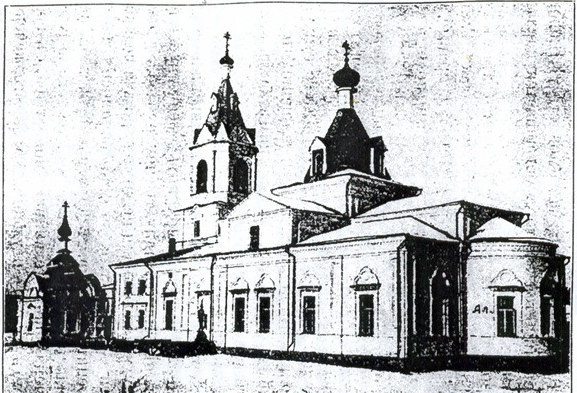
- Church in the name of St. Nicholas the Wonderworker
- Klyuchegorsky Kazan Mother of God Monastery
- 53.0819°N 53.0349°E
- Location: Tally, Samara
- Country: Russia
- Denomination: Orthodox Christian church

History
- Founded: 1864

Architecture
- Functional status: Inactive

Administration
- Diocese: Diocese of Samara

Klyuchegorsky Kazan Mother of God Monastery is a former women's monastery, in the Diocese of Samara of the Russian Orthodox Church. It operated from the second half of the 19th century to the first third of the 20th century (since 2011, it has been located within the Diocese of Buzuluk).

It was located in the village of Tally (Klyuchegorye), Buzuluk Uyezd, Samara Governorate (now Grachyovsky District, Orenburg Oblast, Orenburg Oblast). It was established in 1864 on the estate and with the funds of a local landowner and philanthropist, Anna Putilova, who also led the community. In 1880, the community was transformed into a third-class cenobitic monastery. Initially quite poor, by the early 20th century, through improved donation collection, the monastery became the second most significant women's monastery in Orenburg Oblast, gaining widespread popularity. It had five churches.

After the establishment of Soviet power, it operated under the guise of an agricultural cooperative until 1923, when the abbess was murdered by unknown assailants, leading to the monastery's closure and plunder. Some stone buildings, including one church, have survived but are in disrepair. An Orthodox parish in Tally aims to restore the monastery, focusing on preserving and restoring its structures.

== History ==
=== Community's foundation ===
In the 1830s, a prominent landowner, Pavel Petrovich Putilov, owned Klyuchegorye, a small village 70 versts from Buzuluk in Buzuluksky Uyezd, Samara Governorate, located in a valley with surrounding lands. In the early 1840s, he died, and 3088 dessiatins of land around the village passed to his childless widow, Anna Ivanovna Putilova. She settled in the area, relocating her 46 male serfs near the village, closer to the Tally River, after which the new settlement was named. In 1855, the peasants of Klyuchegorye inherited by other heirs were moved to other villages. Tally and Klyuchegorye merged into one settlement, with both names used thereafter.

Anna Putilova was deeply religious. Settling in Tally, she began efforts to build a church on her estate, as the nearest church was about 35 versts away, preventing regular attendance at services. She met Efimiya Ovsyannikova, a resident of Buzuluk, who sought to establish an Orthodox women's religious community. Supporting Ovsyannikova, Putilova donated 100 dessiatins of land near Tally. A khutor for the community was founded there, housing women and girls dedicated to spiritual life under monastic rules.

In February 1844, Ovsyannikova petitioned the Orenburg bishop, Ioanniky, to establish a women's community with monastic rules, noting that if opened on Putilova's estate, she promised an additional 11 dessiatins and 280 square sazhens of land for cells and would build a temporary church at her expense. Governorate authorities favored Tally, but the Holy Synod decreed the community be established in Buzuluk at the Tikhvin Mother of God Monastery.

Undeterred, Putilova persisted. In 1845, a parish was created in Klyuchegorye with a clergy assigned to the church under construction, serving nearby villages. In 1847, a small church in the name of the Kazan Icon of Our Lady was consecrated. Putilova continued pursuing the establishment of a women's community.

The campaign gained momentum with the discovery of an icon of Nicholas the Wonderworker. According to monastery tradition, on October 31, 1854, a Sunday, teenagers returning to Tally from the steppe noticed two red flags in a swampy area below the village among reeds. The priest and peasants found an icon of the saint tied to the flagpoles. The icon was solemnly transferred to the church, and after verification by the dean, diocesan authorities permitted prayer services before it and biannual cross processions to the site of its discovery on October 31 and May 9.

News of this "miraculous discovery" and Putilova's intent to found a women's monastery spread. Women aspiring to become nuns began approaching her, settling on her estate with her permission. They prayed, engaged in handicrafts, formed a church choir, baked prosphora for the church, and farmed—each sister in this unofficial community performed a duty akin to monastic tasks, though without taking monastic vows. Anna Putilova led the community.

More sisters joined, especially after 1860, when the Pokrovsky Women's Community opened in Buguruslan, with Putilova as a patron. Due to limited space, some women joined the established Klyuchegorsky community.

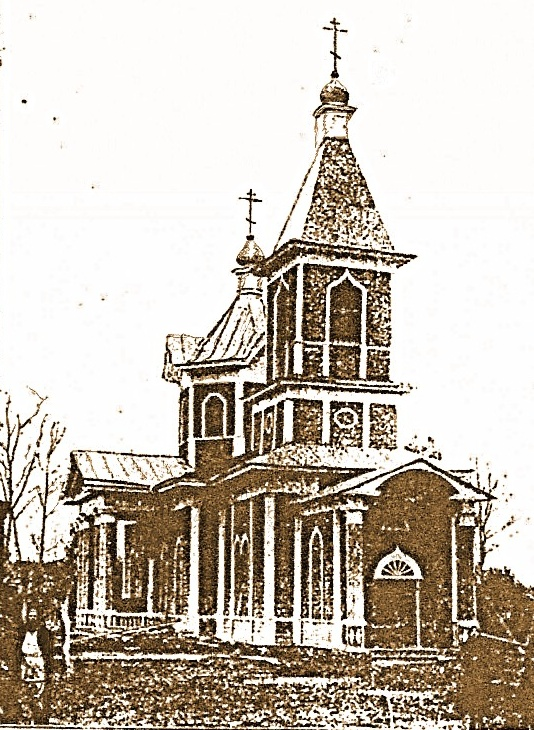
Wooden church in the name of the Kazan Icon of the Mother of God

Some joined claiming divine guidance. A future abbess, Ermionia, one of the first monastic residents, swore she came to Putilova by the command of Saint Nicholas, who appeared to her. Intending to join the Buguruslan monastery, she met an elder near Tally who said:

— How far are you wandering, servant of God?

— I'm going to Buguruslan, she replied, I wish to join the monastery there.

— Go to Tally, said the elder.

— But there's no monastery there, she replied, puzzled.

— There is and will be, said the elder, and you will labor much for that monastery.

Believing the elder, she turned toward Tally, finding a "small monastery" and stayed with Putilova's permission. As the community grew to 36 sisters, Putilova petitioned to establish a women's monastery. In February 1861, she traveled to Samara and personally submitted a petition to Bishop Theophilus, promising to donate 275 dessiatins initially and 725 more by her will.

The process took nearly three years. On January 18, 1864, imperial permission was granted to establish the Klyuchegorsky Kazan Mother of God Women's Community. Anna Putilova was appointed its abbess.

After approval, land was allocated and enclosed with a partial wooden fence and wattle. Anna Ivanovna began construction, building three small houses for the sisters: one wooden and two of adobe brick. She converted half her own house into a warm house church in honor of the Virgin of Smolensk.

In August 1871, Putilova died. On September 3, 1871, the sisters elected a new abbess, Theophania, previously abbess of the Rakovsky Women's Monastery in Samara Uyezd. In 1873, a hospital with eight beds opened. In January 1875, a one-class women's school was established, with Priest N. Berezhnoy as the first catechism teacher.

=== Monastery's establishment ===
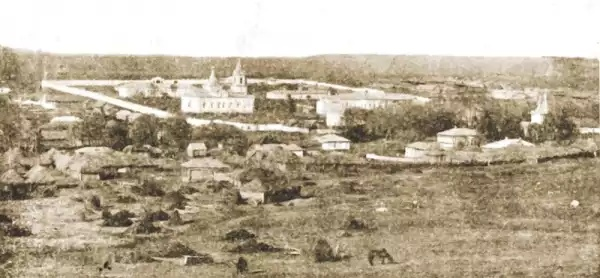
General view of Klyuchegorsky Monastery, 1914

By decree No. 1575 of the Holy Synod on March 15, 1880, the community was transformed into a third-class cenobitic monastery named Klyuchegorsky Kazan Mother of God, with the abbess elevated to igumena and awarded a pectoral cross. On June 29, Theophania was elevated to igumena in Samara. On July 6 and 7, the first tonsure occurred, with several sisters tonsured into rasophore and mantiya. On July 8, the patronal feast of the Appearance of the Kazan Icon, the monastery was solemnly opened with a cross procession and a thanksgiving moleben.

By then, the monastery had two churches: one cold, outside the estate, and another converted from the foundress's house, small and cramped, unable to accommodate all worshippers on Sundays and holidays. The sisters requested permission to build a new church, but lacked funds. The Samara spiritual consistory issued a donation collection book. A collector and assistants were chosen and sent to Moscow.

According to tradition, in Moscow, the nuns were advised to stay at merchant Ermakov's house, which had rooms for monastery donation collectors. However, they were refused due to lack of space. As they stood in the rain, Ermakov noticed them from his window, invited them in, and inquired about their purpose. Learning of the monastery's poverty, he promised to build a stone church in the name of Saint Nicholas if his sick wife, Ekaterina, recovered. He allowed them to stay in his study, ordering his staff to feed and dry them. The nuns prayed all night, and the next morning, Ermakov reported his wife's improvement, saying, "By your prayers and the mercy of Saint Nicholas, my wife feels well now, so I resolve to fulfill my promise. I will build a warm stone church in your monastery. Send a letter to your igumena to come or send a trusted representative".

A letter was sent to Klyuchegorye, and treasurer nun Ermionia went to Moscow, as Igumena Theophania was unwell. Ermionia received Ermakov's construction plan, instructions, and funds. The monastery prepared materials that winter, and in spring 1883, Igumen Nifont of Buzuluk Men's Monastery consecrated the site. Construction began.

On October 1, 1883, Igumena Theophania died, and on November 18, nun Sophia from Monastery of the Theotokos of Iveron became abbess. Under her, the church was completed after five years. On August 16 and 17, 1888, Igumen Nifont consecrated the side chapels, and on August 18, during the name day of sponsor Flor Yakovlevich Ermakov, with him and his wife present, Bishop Seraphim of Samara consecrated the main altar. Seeing the monastery's poverty firsthand, Ermakov donated 5,000 rubles as untouchable capital for its maintenance and 1,000 rubles for the clergy.

On April 25, 1889, Sophia died. On July 13, with elevation to igumena, treasurer nun Ermionia (Elena Maksimovna Rogulina) became abbess. Three years later, Bishop Gury, supportive of monasteries, took the Samara see. Visiting Klyuchegorsky in his first year, he noted its poverty and lack of space and utensils. Gury issued donation books, suggested benefactors, and advised on management. Collectors traveled across Russia, visiting Moscow, Saint Petersburg, Odessa, Astrakhan, the Caucasus, and Siberia. Generous donations improved the monastery's finances. Funds enabled major construction: in 1898, a new stone wall enclosed the monastery, three large two-story cell blocks were built—two stone (36 cells each) and one semi-stone. A chapel was built at the spring where the Saint Nicholas icon was found, a two-story stone refectory church was started, and workshops opened: icon painting, down, embroidery, and carpet weaving. Donors gave money and valuables, including an anonymous 150-pood (2457 kg) bell and 1,016 dessiatins of land, totaling 2,016 dessiatins with Putilova's donation.

Igumena Ermionia, previously an economess and treasurer, secured the monastery's economy. After her death in 1904, the sisters unanimously elected rasophore novice Evdokiya Litvinova as abbess. She was tonsured by Bishop Gury in Samara as Ermionia II and elevated to igumena on March 13, 1905.

Under her, construction continued. The refectory church was completed and consecrated, a cattle yard, dairy farm, stables, forge, and a rebuilt pilgrim house were added. Astrakhan merchant Ivan Tsvetkov funded an Abyssinian well. In 1906, the monastery school moved to a new wooden building with a teacher's apartment and two nuns as cleaners. The abbess's residence was rebuilt with modern amenities: plumbing, a bathroom, central (calorifer heating, and formal rooms upstairs.

The monastery became highly popular, attracting thousands of pilgrims on Saint Nicholas's patronal feasts. However, during the 1905 Revolution, Trostyanka villagers illegally cut and removed monastery timber, as reported by the Samara governorate's gendarmes.

Insurance records from 1910 show the monastery owned 69 buildings and structures. In 1914, it prepared for its 50th jubilee. A brochure on its history was published in Kyiv at the Kievo-Pechersk Lavra, and Elisabeth Feodorovna, the empress's sister, was expected to attend. The First World War disrupted the celebrations and visits. The monastery's guesthouse soon housed Belarusian refugees.

=== Soviet Period ===
In the early years of Soviet power, the monastery operated as an agricultural artel. In 1918, its guesthouse was repurposed as a people's house and library. Some buildings, including the abbess's residence, housed the sovkhoz administration. In summer 1921, when a 25-man armed gang operated in the area, the monastery walls served as a fortification. The sovkhoz administration took refuge there under a small ChON detachment. Bandits breached the monastery but retreated after armed resistance, leaving one dead.

In autumn 1921, the sovkhoz administration buildings became a children's home. In 1925, the monastery's house church closed, with the building housing the volispolkom on the first floor and a club on the second, later used as a village school.

In 1924, the Klyuchegorsky agricultural artel, under which the nuns sought legitimacy, still held 500 dessiatins of land, too much to farm alone. The nuns leased land to nearby villagers without documentation. The Buzuluk Uyezd executive committee, learning of this, seized 30 dessiatins for Children's Labor Colony No. 79, housing 600 children, and registered the remaining land and property with the volost soviet.

The standoff could have continued, but Abbess Ermionia II was soon shot through her cell window at night by unknown assailants. Locals believed the militia acted on authorities' orders to eliminate the resolute abbess. After her death, the monastery could not resist the authorities, was swiftly closed, and looted. Local historian G. Voronin recalled that non-valuable church and monastery items were dumped in a ravine and burned. Residents saved some items; Voronin's brother secretly removed two lamps and two icons, including the Saint Nicholas icon, which was later lost. Other items were also preserved.

=== Present Day ===
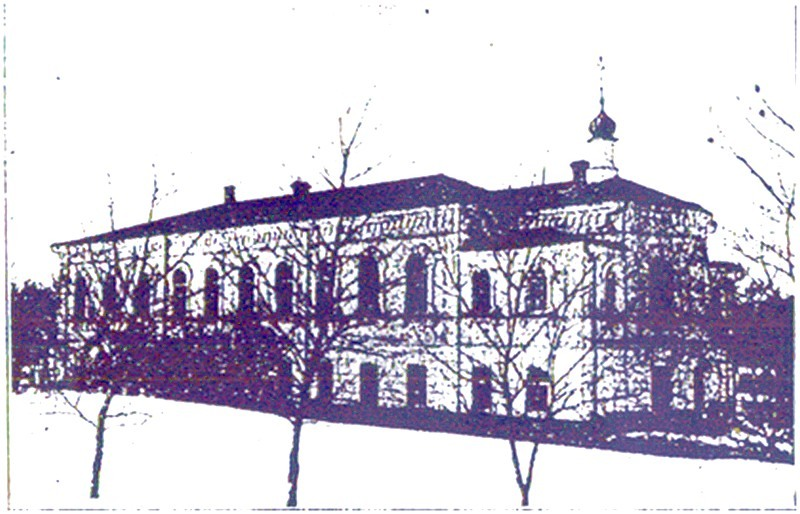
Refectory church in the name of Saint Seraphim of Sarov

The Klyuchegorsky Kazan Mother of God Monastery no longer officially exists.

Located in a remote, sparsely populated area far from major roads, it was barely used by Soviet institutions, and its buildings deteriorated. Wooden buildings were completely destroyed, while stone ones partially survived. Two buildings house residences but are in disrepair and need major repairs. The abbess's residence, heavily damaged by fire, houses a local hospital in its surviving part. The monastery wall partially remains.

Of the five churches, only the two-story brick refectory church in honor of Seraphim of Sarov survives, used as a village store but also in disrepair and needing restoration. Well-preserved economic buildings are still used by a local agricultural enterprise.

Many Tally residents hold items from the monastery, including icons. The Cosmas and Damian church in Grachyovka preserves monastery items: a forged cross, a 34 kg bell, and an icon of martyrs Faith, Hope, Charity, and their mother Sophia. A copy of the Saint Nicholas icon from the monastery is held by Tally residents.

In summer 2002, Hieromonk Valentin (Korobov) visited Tally. The elderly Orenburg priest frequently traveled to the remote village, working to restore the monastery. In December 2008, he and Orenburg supporters registered a parish in the name of the Kazan Icon in Tally to organize its restoration. The parish settled in a room in the former abbess's residence, now an outpatient clinic. A prayer room, refectory, and several cells were gradually organized.

In 2012, Hieromonk Valentin and parishioners began repairing a sisters' building, formerly a boarding school. Windows, doors, and floors were replaced, cosmetic repairs done, and a new roof installed. An altar and iconostasis were set up on the eastern side.

On September 15, 2012, Bishop Alexy of Buzuluk and Sorochinsk consecrated the house church of the Tabyinskaya Icon of the Mother of God in Tally.

== Property ==
The monastery owned 2,073 dessiatins of land, mostly donated by benefactors.

The monastery grounds had eight buildings, mostly wooden. Three housed sisters; others contained a bakery, kvass brewery, prosphora bakery, painting, and handicraft workshops.

The territory was enclosed by a fence with seven wooden barns, five cellars, and an adobe storeroom. It included a fruit orchard and monastery cemetery. Outside the fence were a brick factory with a hired master, a forge, a horse yard with a workshop, and a stone shed for agricultural tools.

Three versts away was a second fruit orchard and apiary. Five versts away, on the Tally River, was a watermill.

The monastery had a library with up to 290 books and an archive kept since 1871.

It owned two guesthouses and three metochions. One was in Buzuluk on Nikolskaya Street, with a wooden house on a stone foundation. Another was in Samara at the corner of Uralskaya and Predtechenskaya (now Korostelev Brothers and Nekrasovskaya), on land donated by Samara burgher S. Deonisova. In 1912, another Samara burgher donated land on Samarskaya Street between Pochtovaya and Alexandrovskaya (now Rabochaya and Vilonovskaya) for a third metochion, with a wooden house and two outbuildings.

=== Monastery Churches ===
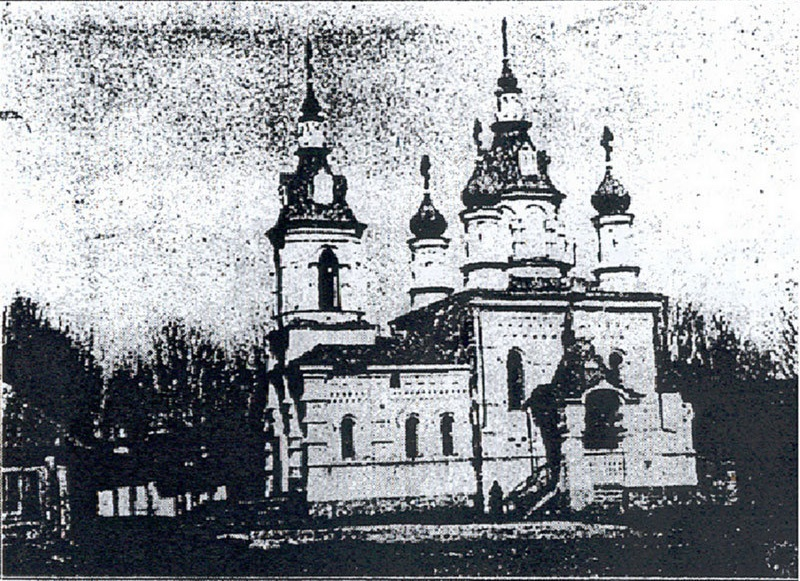
Stone church at the spring where the Saint Nicholas icon was found

The first church was a wooden, cold, single-altar church consecrated to the Our Lady of Kazan, located near but not on monastery grounds. A wooden bell tower was built nearby, both funded by A. I. Putilova. Patronal feasts were celebrated on July 8 and October 22.

In 1865, a warm wooden house church in the name of the Virgin of Smolensk was built on monastery grounds. In 1874, due to limited capacity, it was expanded with a chapel in the name of Nicholas the Wonderworker. Both altars were consecrated by the monastery's dean, Igumen Nifont of Buzuluk. In 1880, with Bishop Seraphim's permission, it was further expanded with a western refectory addition. The refectory's feast was celebrated on July 28.

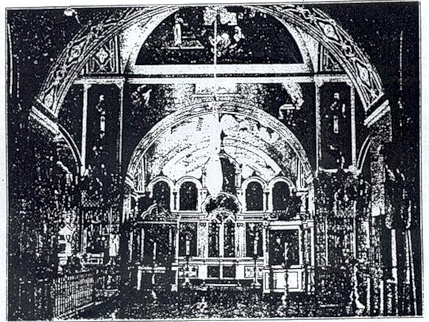
Interior of the main church in the name of Saint Nicholas

In 1883, a three-altar stone church in the name of Saint Nicholas was begun. Sponsor state councilor and honorary citizen of Moscow, F. Y. Ermakov, donated 60,000 rubles, with the rest from monastery funds. Completed by August 1888, all three altars were consecrated: the main one for Saint Nicholas, the right for Apostles Peter and Paul, and the left for Saint John the Confessor. A stone bell tower was added in 1891, and a psalter and sacristy extension in 1899. Feasts were celebrated on May 9 and December 6 for the main altar, June 29 for the right, and March 21 for the left.

In 1904, a three-altar refectory church began construction, designed by Samara architect T. S. Khilinsky, and was completed in 1906. Externally resembling a two-story house with a single small dome, the first floor housed sisters' quarters, and the second held the church. The main altar was consecrated to venerable Seraphim of Sarov, the right to John Chrysostom, and the left to Saint Nicholas. The main and right altars were consecrated on July 19 and 20, 1906, and the left on July 7, 1907. Feasts were celebrated on July 19 for the main altar, January 27 and November 13 for the right, and May 9 and December 6 for the left.

In 1902, outside the monastery fence, at the spring where the Saint Nicholas icon was found, a single-altar stone church in his honor was built with a bell tower, funded by Astrakhan landowner N. E. Yankov. Feasts were celebrated on May 9 and December 6.

=== Chapels ===
The monastery had two chapels. One was on the monastery cemetery above a crypt housing the first two abbesses, Agnia (A. I. Putilova) and Ermionia I (E. M. Roguz(l)ina). The second was at the spring of the Saint Nicholas icon's appearance, divided into four parts: one with a well, and three with bathing areas for pilgrims. In the early 20th century, it was dismantled due to disrepair, and a church was built in its place.

=== Monastery Relics ===
The main relics were:

- An icon of the Virgin of Smolensk, brought by Abbess A. I. Putilova from Sedmiozernaya Hermitage in Kazan Governorate;
- An icon of Saint Nicholas, found at the spring;
- A copy of the miraculous Virgin of Tabynsk;
- An icon of the Theotokos of Tolga, which streamed myrrh for a month in 1894, with weekly moleben and akathist services.
- Relics from various donors, initially in a silver-gilt cross among saints' icons, and from August 1889, by Bishop Seraphim's blessing, in a reliquary brought by nun Nafaila from Jerusalem.

== Services ==
Besides daily services and cross processions, special services were permitted by the Samara spiritual consistory on September 18, 1893. Biannual cross processions on October 31 and May 9 went from the monastery gates to the spring, where a chapel, later a church, commemorated the Saint Nicholas icon's discovery.

== Monastics ==
Initially, the community had 40 nuns. By 1886, the number grew to 217. In 1898, the monastery housed 352 people: 75 mantiya nuns, 154 official novices, and 123 novices. From 1916 until closure, it had 458 nuns: one igumena-abbess, 85 mantiya nuns, 162 official and rasophore novices, and 210 novices.

=== Abbesses ===
The community's founder and first abbess, Anna Ivanovna Putilova (née Khrist), was the granddaughter of a German from Kassel who entered Russian service in the 18th century. Her father, Ivan, served in the 2nd Orenburg Regular Cossack Regiment, retiring in 1796 as a premier-major. Anna married Pavel Petrovich Putilov, son of Buzuluk's noble leader Pyotr Ivanovich Putilov. In the early 1840s, her husband, an artillery captain, died. Childless, she used her inheritance for charity, donating 100 dessiatins to Tikhvin Mother of God Monastery (Buzuluk), 310 to Moisky Holy Trinity Monastery, and supporting other diocesan monasteries.

In August 1871, Putilova traveled to Buzuluk for business, where she contracted cholera. There, she took monastic tonsure from the abbot of the Spaso-Preobrazhensky Monastery in Buzuluk, Nifont, and received the name Agnia. She died soon afterward. By order of Bishop Gerasimos, she was buried in the Buzuluk male monastery. Thirty years later, on June 20, 1900, with permission from the civil and spiritual authorities, her ashes were transferred to the Klyuchegorsk Monastery and placed in a special crypt on the right side of St. Nicholas Church.

Abbess Ermionia II (E. M. Litvinova) was the last abbess from 1904 until the monastery's closure. She was born around 1868. In 1923, she was presumably shot through the window of her cell. Originally, she was buried in a crypt next to the monastery's founder, but street children living in a children's colony housed in the monastery buildings removed her body from the crypt. After that, her ashes were reburied in the Tallov Cemetery.
