= List of monastic houses in the Kingdom of Hungary =

Monastic houses in the Kingdom of Hungary include abbeys, priories and friaries, among other monastic religious houses.

== List of monastic houses in Hungary ==
List of monastic houses in the Kingdom of Hungary
Settlement	Dedication	Foundation	Order	Picture	County
Marosvár (part of Nagycsanád, Romanian: Cenad)	John the Baptist	11th century	Basilian		today in Romania
Oroszlámos (Serbian: Банатско Аранђелово)	Saint George	11th century	Basilian		today in Serbia
Veszprémvölgy (part of Veszprém)	Holy Mary	10-11th century	Basilian		Veszprém County
Visegrád		11th century (ceased in 1221)	Basilian		Pest County
Szávaszentdemeter (Serbian: Сремска Митровица)	Demetrius of Thessaloniki	11th century	Basilian later Benedictine		today in Serbia
Csernekhegy (part of Munkács, Ukrainian: Мукачево)	Saint Nicholas	14th century	Basilian		today in Ukraine
Máriapócs	Basil of Caesarea	between 1731 and 1749	Basilian		Szabolcs-Szatmár-Bereg County
Ungvár (Ukrainian: У́жгород)		1773	Basilian		today in Ukraine
Laborcrév (Slovak: Krásny Brod)	Holy Trinity	15th century	Basilian		today in Slovakia
Bukóchegy (Slovak: Bukovce)	Basil of Caesarea	1742	Basilian		today in Slovakia
Bikszád (Romanian: Bixad)	Saint Peter and Saint Paul	1689	Basilian		today in Romania
Misztice (Ukrainian: Імстичово)	Saint Michael the Archangel	1676	Basilian		today in Ukraine
Kisberezna (Ukrainian: Малий Березний)	Saint Nicholas	1742	Basilian		today in Ukraine
Husztbaranya (Ukrainian: Боронява)		1716	Basilian		today in Ukraine
Hajdúdorog		1933	Basilian		Hajdú-Bihar County
Makó		1946	Basilian		Csongrád County
Kispest		1948	Basilian		Budapest
Dunapentele (today Dunaújváros)	Saint Pantaleon	12th century	Beguines or Benedictine		Fejér County
Pannonhalma Archabbey (in Pannonhalma)	Martin of Tours	996	Benedictine		Győr-Moson-Sopron County
Bakonybél Abbey (in Bakonybél)	Saint Maurice	11th century	Benedictine		Veszprém County
Zalavár	Adrian of Nicomedia	1019	Benedictine		Zala County
Pécsvárad Abbey (in Pécsvárad)	Holy Mary and Benedict of Nursia	1009	Benedictine		Baranya County
Zobor Abbey (in Nyitra (Slovak: Nitra))	Hippolytus of Rome	11th century	Benedictine		today in Slovakia
Tihany Abbey (in Tihany)	Aignan of Orleans	1055	Benedictine		Veszprém County
Szekszárd Abbey (in Szekszárd)	Salvator Mundi	1061 (ceased in 1526)	Benedictine		Tolna County
Kolozsmonostor Abbey (in Kolozsvár (Romanian: Cluj-Napoca))	Holy Mary	11th century	Benedictine		today in Romania
Garamszentbenedek (Slovak: Hronský Beňadik)	Benedict of Nursia	1075	Benedictine		today in Slovakia
Mogyoród	Saint George	11th century	Benedictine		Pest County
Szentjobb (Romanian: Sâniob)	Holy Mary	11th century	Benedictine later Pauline Fathers		today in Romania
Somogyvár Abbey (in Somogyvár)	Holy Trinity; Saint Peter and Saint Paul; Saint Giles	1091	Benedictine		Somogy County
Báta	Michael the Archangel	1093	Benedictine		Tolna County
Bélakút (part of Újvidék Serbian: Нови Сад)		1234	Cistercian		Szerém County
Bijela Stijena	Holy Mary				today in Croatia
Botpuszta (part of Etyek)		1758	Nazarene Sisters		Fejér County
Béla (part of Szircs (Croatian: Sirač))	Margaret of Antioch		Benedictine		today in Croatia
Cikádor (today Bátaszék)	Holy Mary	1142	Cistercian		Baranya County
Marosvár (part of Nagycsanád, Romanian: Cenad)	Virgin Mary	11th century	Benedictine		today in Romania
Csolt (part of Vésztő)	All Saints	11-12th century	Benedictine		Békés County
Debalch / Dabolc (part of Halmi (Romanian: Halmeu))			Benedictine		today in Romania
Celldömölk			Benedictine		Vas County
Dorozsma (today Kiskundoroszsma, part of Szeged)			Benedictine		Csongrád County
Szávasziget	James the Great	1315	Cistercian		today in Croatia
Brassó (Romanian: Brașov)		1202	Cistercian		today in Romania
Pozsony (Slovak: Bratislava)		1132	Cistercian later Clarissan		today in Slovakia
Veszprémvölgy (part of Veszprém)	Holy Mary	1240 (until 1440)	Cistercian later Dominican		Veszprém County
Ivanics (Croatian: Kloštar Ivanić)	Holy Mary	1246	Cistercian		today in Croatia
Nagyesztergár	Regina Mundi	1945	Cistercian		Veszprém County
Toldi-puszta (part of Andocs)	Holy Mary	1949	Cistercian		Somogy County
Almád Abbey (in Almád, part of Monostorapáti)	Holy Mary		Benedictine		Veszprém County
Boldva	John the Baptist	between 1175 and 1180	Benedictine		Borsod-Abaúj-Zemplén County
Debrő (today Feldebrő)	Holy Cross		Benedictine		Heves County
Esztergom	Holy Mary		Benedictine		Komárom-Esztergom County
Ják	Saint George		Benedictine		Vas County
Kána (part of Budapest)		13-14th century	Benedictine		Budapest
Lébény	James the Great		Benedictine		Győr-Moson-Sopron County
Pásztó	Saint Nicholas later Holy Mary		Benedictine from 1194 Cistercian		Nógrád County
Szermonostora (part of Ópusztaszer)			Benedictine		Csongrád County
Győr			Benedictine		Győr-Moson-Sopron County
Vértesszentkereszt (part of Oroszlány)	Holy Cross		Benedictine		Komárom-Esztergom County
Zselicszentjakab Abbey (in Kaposvár)	James the Great		Benedictine		Somogy County
Apácavásárhely (part of Somlóvásárhely)	Lambert of Maastricht		Benedictine		Veszprém County
Ákosmonostor (part of Galgahévíz) - monostor			Benedictine		Pest County
Baracska	All Saints		Benedictine		Fejér County
Bátmonostor	Holy Mary		Benedictine		Bács-Kiskun County
Babócsa	Saint Nicholas		Benedictine		Somogy County
Becske			Benedictine		Nógrád County
Beszterec			Benedictine		Szabolcs-Szatmár-Bereg County
Bökénysomlyó (part of Polgárdi)			Benedictine		Fejér County
Büdmonostor (part of Tiszavasvári)			Benedictine		Szabolcs-Szatmár-Bereg County
Cégénymonostor (part of Cégénydányád)	Holy Mary		Benedictine		Szabolcs-Szatmár-Bereg County
Csaholymonostora (part of Nyírcsaholy)			Benedictine		Szabolcs-Szatmár-Bereg County
Csatár	Saint Peter	12th century	Benedictine		Zala County
Császló			Benedictine		Szabolcs-Szatmár-Bereg County
Elléspuszta (part of Csongrád)			Benedictine		Csongrád County
Ercsi	Saint Nicholas		Benedictine		Fejér County
Zalaapáti	Adrian of Nicomedia		Benedictine		Zala County
Dunaföldvár	Saint Peter		Benedictine		Tolna County
Gáborján	Michael the Archangel		Benedictine		Hajdú-Bihar County
Gerla (part of Békéscsaba)			Benedictine		Békés County
Kötegyán	Andrew the Apostle		Benedictine		Békés County
Gyula			Benedictine		Békés County
Hahót	Margaret of Antioch		Benedictine		Zala County
Nagyhalász	Holy Mary		Benedictine		Szabolcs-Szatmár-Bereg County
Jásd	Saint George		Benedictine		Veszprém County
Kács	Saint Peter		Benedictine		Borsod-Abaúj-Zemplén County
Kemecse			Benedictine		Szabolcs-Szatmár-Bereg County
Poroszló	Saint Peter and Saint Paul		Benedictine		Heves County
Prügy			Benedictine		Borsod-Abaúj-Zemplén County
Ság (part of Karancsság)			Benedictine		Nógrád County
Sáp			Benedictine		Hajdú-Bihar County
Abasár	Holy Mary	11th century	Benedictine		Heves County
Sárvár (part of Nagyecsed)	Saint Peter		Benedictine		Szabolcs-Szatmár-Bereg County
Szabolcs	Holy Mary		Benedictine		Szabolcs-Szatmár-Bereg County
Szakál (today Nógrádszakál)			Benedictine		Nógrád County
Százd (part of Tiszakeszi)	Holy Mary		Benedictine		Borsod-Abaúj-Zemplén County
Püspökszentlászló (part of Hosszúhetény)	Ladislaus of Hungary		Benedictine		Baranya County
Szenttrinitás (part of Vokány)	Holy Trinity		Benedictine		Baranya County
Szerencs	Saint Peter and Saint Paul		Benedictine		Borsod-Abaúj-Zemplén County
Szerep			Benedictine		Hajdú-Bihar County
Szigetmonostor	Salvator Mundi		Benedictine		Pest County
Szólátmonostor (part of Debrecen)			Benedictine		Hajdú-Bihar County
Szőreg	Philip the Apostle		Benedictine		Csongrád County
Miskolctapolca (part of Miskolc)	Saint Peter		Benedictine		Borsod-Abaúj-Zemplén County
Tata	Saint Peter		Benedictine		Komárom-Esztergom County
Tárnok	All Saints		Benedictine		Pest County
Telki	Stephen of Hungary		Benedictine		Pest County
Tereske	Holy Mary		Benedictine		Nógrád County
Tétmonostora (part of Szolnok)			Benedictine		
Tomajmonostora			Benedictine		Jász-Nagykun-Szolnok County
Torda (today Bihartorda)			Benedictine		Hajdú-Bihar County
Tömpös-puszta (part of Makó)	Holy Mary		Benedictine		Csongrád County
Ugramonostora (part of Biharugra)	Holy Mary		Benedictine		Hajdú-Bihar County
Vidmonostora (part of Hajdúböszörmény)	Holy Cross		Benedictine		Hajdú-Bihar County
Visegrád	Andrew the Apostle		Benedictine		Pest County
Vizesmonostor (part of Battonya)			Benedictine		Békés County
Zámmonostora (part of Nagyiván)			Benedictine		Heves County
Zebegény	Michael the Archangel		Benedictine		Pest County
Ajtonymonostora (part of Szemlak (Romanian: Semlac))			Benedictine		today in Romania
Almásmonostora (part of Váralmás (Romanian: Almașu))			Benedictine later Premonstratensian		today in Romania
Ákosmonostora (today Ákos (Romanian: Acâș))			Benedictine		today in Romania
Bátor (today Feketebátor (Romanian: Batăr))			Benedictine		today in Romania
Bizeresződ (part of Szépfalu (Romanian: Frumușeni)	Holy Mary		Benedictine		today in Romania
Bulcs (Romanian: Bulci)	Holy Mary		Benedictine		today in Romania
Egyedmonostor (part of Diószeg (Romanian: Diosig)	All Saints		Benedictine		today in Romania
Eperjes (part of Kelmák (Romanian: Chelmac))			Benedictine		today in Romania
Gyelid (part of Arad)			Benedictine		today in Romania
Gyerőmonostora (today Magyargyerőmonostor (Romanian: Mănăstireni))			Benedictine		today in Romania
Harina (Romanian: Herina)			Benedictine		today in Romania
Hodoș-Bodrog Monastery (in Hodosmonostora, part of Pécska (Romanian: Pecica)	Saint Peter		Benedictine		today in Romania
Kaplony (Romanian: Căpleni)	Martin of Tours		Benedictine		today in Romania
Kenézmonostora (part of Nagylak (Romanian: Nădlac)			Benedictine		today in Romania
Kolozsmonostor (part of Kolozsvár (Romanian: Cluj-Napoca)	Holy Mary		Benedictine		today in Romania
Meszes (part of Zsákfalva (Romanian: Viile Jacului))	Margaret of Antioch		Benedictine later Premonstratensian		today in Romania
Zákánymonostor / Bégamonostor (Romanian: Mănăștiur			Benedictine		today in Romania
Pankota (Romanian: Pâncota)			Benedictine		today in Romania
Porgány (Romanian: Pordeanu)			Benedictine		today in Romania
Rahonca (part of Szatmárnémeti Romanian: Satu Mare)	Michael the Archangel		Benedictine		today in Romania
Szentimre (today Hegyközszentimre Romanian: Sântimreu)			Benedictine		today in Romania
Szentjános (today Biharszentjános (Romanian: Borș))	John the Baptist		Benedictine		today in Romania
Adorján (Serbian: Адорјан)	Holy Mary		Benedictine		today in Serbia
Aracsa (part of Törökbecse (Serbian: Нови Бечеј))	Saint Nicholas		Benedictine		today in Serbia
Aranylábúbács (part of Bács (Serbian: Бач)	Saint Nicholas		Benedictine		today in Serbia
Báka (part of Doroszló (Serbian: Дорослово)			Benedictine		today in Serbia
Berzétemonostor (Croatian: Nuštar)	Holy Spirit		Benedictine		today in Croatia
Bozók (Slovak: Bzovík)		1124	Benedictine		today in Slovakia
Dombó (Serbian: Раковац)	Saint George		Benedictine		today in Serbia
Frankavilla (today Nagyolaszi Serbian: Манђелос))			Benedictine		today in Serbia
Galádmonostora (part of Karlova (Serbian: Ново Милошево))			Benedictine		today in Serbia
Garáb (Serbian: Грабово)	Margaret of Antioch	c. 1093	Benedictine		today in Serbia
Hanva (Slovak: Chanava)	Saint George		Benedictine		today in Slovakia
Ittebe (Serbian: Српски Итебеј)	Most Sacred Savior	13th century	Benedictine		today in Serbia
Jánosi (Slovak: Rimavské Janovce)	John the Baptist		Benedictine		today in Slovakia
Kanizsamonostor (Serbian: Банатски Моноштор)			Benedictine		today in Serbia
Kolos (today Nagykolos (Slovak: Veľký Klíž))	Holy Mary		Benedictine		today in Slovakia
Kő (part of Bánmonostor (Serbian: Banoštor)	Saint Stephen		Benedictine		today in Serbia
Ludány (today Nyitraludány (Slovak: Ludanice))			Benedictine		today in Slovakia
Martonos (Serbian: Мартонош)			Benedictine		today in Serbia
Oroszlánosmonostora (part of Magyarmajdány (Serbian: Мајдан)	Saint George		Benedictine		today in Serbia
Pélmonostor (Croatian: Beli Manastir)		13th century	Benedictine		today in Croatia
Rudina (Cecevac)	Michael the Archangel		Benedictine		today in Croatia
Sándormonostora (part of Dunagálos (Serbian: Gložan))			Benedictine		today in Serbia
Stóla (Slovak: Štôla)	Holy Mary	1314	Benedictine		today in Slovakia
Szentgergely (Serbian: Гргуревци)	Saint Gregory		Benedictine		today in Serbia
Szentgergely (part of Szond (Serbian: Сонта))	Saint Gregory		Benedictine		today in Serbia
Szentpétermonostor (Croatian: Bački Monoštor)	Saint Peter		Benedictine		today in Serbia
Szerafinmonostora (today Lekér (Slovak: Hronovce)	Salvator Mundi		Benedictine		today in Slovakia
Széplak (part of Kassa (Slovak: Košice))	Holy Mary		Benedictine		today in Slovakia
Szkalka (Slovak: Skalka nad Váhom)	Benedict of Nursia		Benedictine		today in Slovakia
Tótmonostora (today part of Nagykikinda (Serbian: Кикинда))			Benedictine		today in Serbia
Egres Abbey (part of Nagyszentpéter)		1179	Cistercian		today in Romania
Zirc Abbey (in Zirc)	Holy Mary	1182	Cistercian		Veszprém County
Pilis (today Pilisszentkereszt)	Holy Mary	1184	Cistercian		Pest County
Szentgotthárd Abbey (in Szentgotthárd)	Gotthard of Hildesheim	1183	Cistercian		Vas County
Kutjevo Abbey (in Gotó)	Holy Mary	1232	Cistercian		today in Croatia
Kerc (Romanian: Cârța)		1202	Cistercian		today in Romania
Toplica		13th century	Cistercian		
Pétervárad (Serbian: Петроварадин)		13th century	Cistercian		today in Serbia
Borsmonostor (part of Répcekethely (German: Mannersdorf an der Rabnitz))		1197	Cistercian		today in Austria
Bélháromkút (today Bélapátfalva)	Holy Mary	1232	Cistercian		Heves County
Ercsi		1238	Carthusian		Fejér County
Menedékkő (part of Létánfalva (Slovak: Letanovce))		1299 (until 1543)	Carthusian		today in Slovakia
Lehnic (Slovak: Lechnica)		1319	Carthusian		today in Slovakia
Felsőtárkány		1332	Carthusian		Heves County
Lövöld (today Városlőd)		1364	Carthusian		Veszprém County
Szentkirály (part of Esztergom)	Holy Mary; Stephen of Hungary	1150	Stephanite		Komárom-Esztergom County
Budafelhévíz (part of Budapest)		1300	Stephanite		Budapest
Visegrád		14th century	Stephanite		Pest County
Golgonca (today part of Kőrös (Croatian: Križevci))		13th century	Order of the Holy Sepulchre		today in Croatia
Tenő (Croatian: Tenje)		13th century	Order of the Holy Sepulchre		today in Croatia
Lándok (Slovak: Lendak)		13th century	Order of the Holy Sepulchre		today in Slovakia
Hunfalva (Slovak: Huncovce)		13th century	Order of the Holy Sepulchre		today in Slovakia
Pozsony (Slovak: Bratislava)		around 1300	Antonite		today in Slovakia
Daróc (today Szepesdaróc (Slovak: Dravce))	Elizabeth of Hungary	1288	Antonite		today in Slovakia
Bozók (Slovak: Bzovík)	Holy Mary	1181	Premonstratensian		today in Slovakia
Brassó (Romanian: Brașov	Catherine of Alexandria	13th century	Premonstratensian		today in Romania
Nagyszeben (Romanian: Sibiu)		13th century	Premonstratensian		today in Romania
Csút Island (part of Budapest)	Saint Eustace	1264	Premonstratensian		Budapest
Garáb		12th century	Premonstratensian		Nógrád County
Horpács			Premonstratensian		Nógrád County
Szentkereszt (today Jánoshida)	John the Baptist	1186	Premonstratensian		Jász-Nagykun-Szolnok County
Majk	Holy Mary	1235	Premonstratensian		Komárom-Esztergom County
Adony (today Nyíradony)	Holy Mary		Premonstratensian		Hajdú-Bihar County
Rabbit Island (part of Budapest)	Michael the Archangel	13th century	Premonstratensian		Budapest
Hatvan		1170	Premonstratensian		Heves County
Ság (Slovak: Šahy)		1237	Premonstratensian		today in Slovakia
Zsámbék	John the Baptist	13th century	Premonstratensian		Pest County
Türje	Holy Mary	1235	Premonstratensian		Zala County
Mórichida	Jacob the Apostel	1251	Premonstratensian		Győr-Moson-Sopron County
Bény (Slovak: Bíňa)	Holy Mary	1217	Premonstratensian		today in Slovakia
Lelesz (Slovak: Leles)	Holy Cross	1188	Premonstratensian		today in Slovakia
Túróc		1251	Premonstratensian		today in Slovakia
Kassa (Slovak: Košice)			Premonstratensian		today in Slovakia
Rozsnyó (Slovak: Rožňava)			Premonstratensian		today in Slovakia
Váradelőhely (part of Nagyvárad (Romanian: Oradea))	Saint Stephen	1130	Premonstratensian		today in Romania
Jászó (Slovak: Jasov)			Premonstratensian		today in Slovakia
Csorna			Premonstratensian		Győr-Moson-Sopron County
Gödöllő		1923	Premonstratensian		Pest County
Zich (?)			Premonstratensian		
Ábrány (Romanian: Abram)			Premonstratensian		today in Romania
Szécs (?)			Premonstratensian		
Gyulafirátót (part of Veszprém)			Premonstratensian		Veszprém County
Ócsa			Premonstratensian		Pest County
Keszthely			Premonstratensian		Zala County
Szombathely			Premonstratensian		Vas County

== Literature ==
- Topor, István : Szerzetesek és szerzetesrendek Magyarországon
- Siska, József : Premontrei szerzetesek a bodrogközi Leleszen
