= Lists of monasteries =

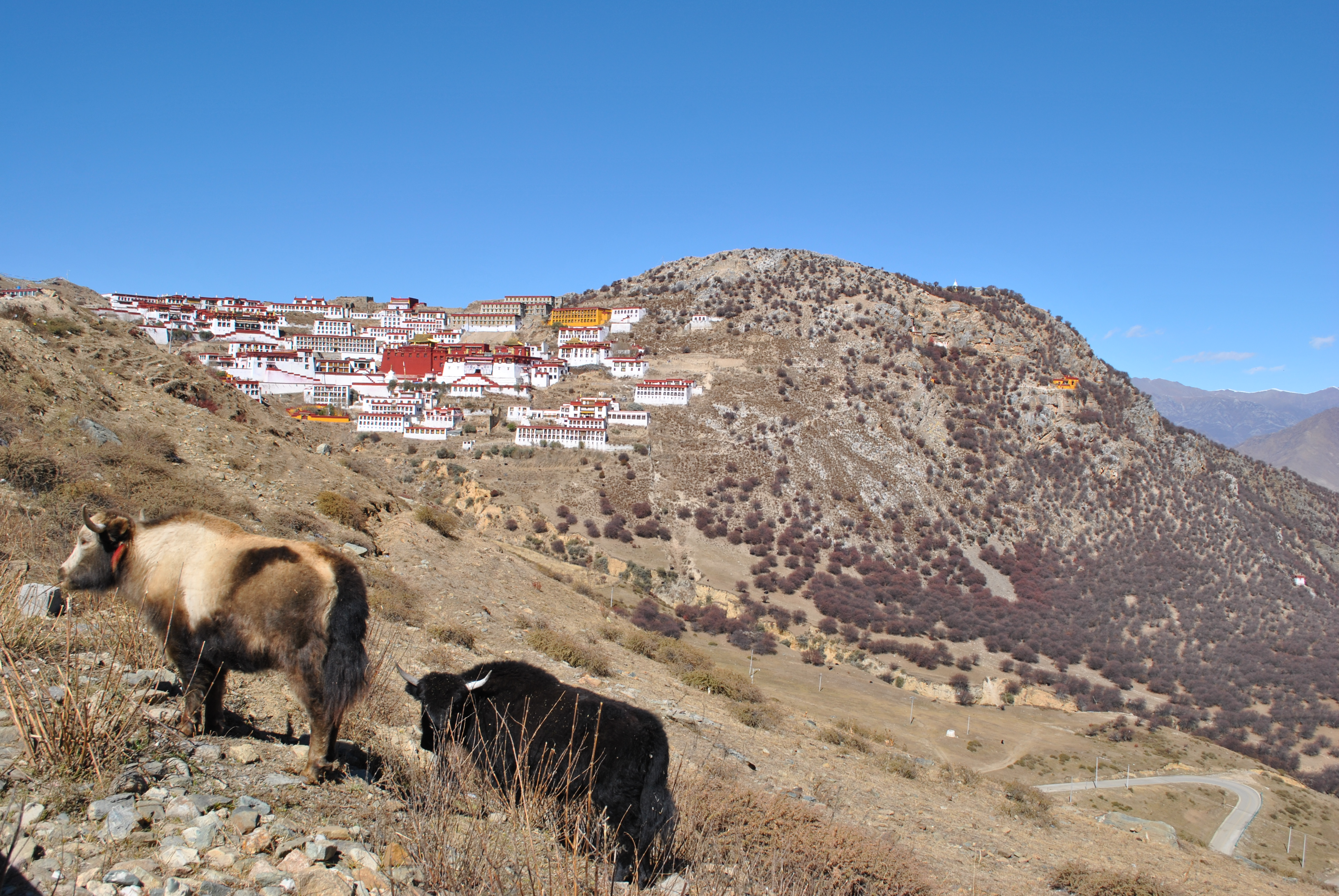
Ganden Monastery, Tibet

Lists of monasteries cover monasteries, buildings or complexes of buildings comprising the domestic quarters and workplaces of monastics, monks or nuns, whether living in communities or alone (hermits). The lists are organized by country or territory, by denomination, by order and by form.

== By country or territory ==
- Monasteries in Armenia
- Monasteries in Australia
- Monasteries in Austria
- Monasteries in Belgium
- Monasteries in Denmark
- Monasteries in England
- Monasteries in Estonia
- Monasteries in Finland
- Monasteries in France
- Monasteries in Germany
- Greece

- Monasteries in Meteora

- Monasteries in Hungary
- Monasteries in Ireland
- Monasteries in Malta
- Monasteries in Norway
- Monasteries in Romania

- Monasteries in Bucharest

- Monasteries in Russia
- Monasteries in Scotland
- Monasteries in Serbia

- Monasteries on Fruška Gora

- Monasteries in Spain

- Monasteries in Madrid

- Monasteries in Sweden
- Monasteries in Switzerland
- Monasteries in Syria
- Monasteries in Tibet
- Monasteries in the United States
- Monasteries in Wales

== By denomination ==
=== Christian monasteries ===
Orthodox monasteries

- List of Coptic monasteries
- List of Romanian Orthodox monasteries
- List of Russian Orthodox monasteries
- List of Serbian Orthodox monasteries
- List of monasteries of the Ukrainian Orthodox Church (Moscow Patriarchate)

=== Buddhist monasteries ===
- List of Tibetan monasteries

== By order ==
- List of Carthusian monasteries
- List of Cistercian monasteries

== By form ==
- List of cave monasteries

== See also ==
- Monastery
- List of abbeys and priories
