= List of monasteries in Madrid =

The following compilation of convents and monasteries in the city of Madrid includes monasteries past and present in Madrid, Spain, divided by the reign in which they were founded. The list gives a sense of how widespread the monastic communities grew to be in the capital city.

Monastic institutions were abundant in Madrid and in Spain before the 19th century. An accurate history would trace the change in tenor and geography of the institutions over the ages, with novel infusions occurring over time, but these institutions commonly had a longevity measured in centuries, and therefore accumulated over the centuries to a great density. They came to control a substantial portion of land and property, and this, in part, led to the rapacious expropriations and dismantling in the 19th century, starting with the secularist Napoleonic administration but continuing through the liberal governments of the 1830s, and given strong impetus during the Ecclesiastical Confiscations of Mendizábal in 1835. Further spasms of destruction in Madrid occurred during the Spanish Civil War.

Many of the boulevards and plazas of the present Madrid derive from the destruction of dozens of monasteries. For some, the only remnant is their church. Others have been put to secular uses. Others have vanished altogether, and only remain as a historic trace embedded in place-name.

The exact number of monasteries and convents in Madrid prior to the Desamortizacion is unclear. Among contemporary sources, they list:

- 66 convents and 18 colleges in a city of 150,000 persons (by the early 19th century, supporting only 1900 monks and 800 nuns)
- 68 convents (1830)
- 33 monasteries of women and 39 of men. (1835).
- 75 convents (1835)

While this number seems elevated, it was not the most densely monastic urban center in Spain. There are sources that claim Spain had over 9000 monasteries prior to the 19th century. The distribution was not even across the peninsula. Some small towns for historical circumstances had accumulated many institutions; for example, Ávila, with 1000 households, had 9 monasteries of men and 7 of women. The entire province of Galicia, with a population of 1.3 million had a total of 98 monastic houses with a population of 2400 monks and 600 nuns. The province of Leon, with half the population had twice the number of monasteries. In the early 19th century, the ancient, and theologically important, city of Toledo had 90 monasteries of men and 68 of women in a city of 25 thousand persons.

== Medieval ==
- Convent of San Martín, (Benedictines): This convent predated the 12th century, existed in front of the Descalzas Reales, and was torn down by Joseph Bonaparte. A plaza with its name remains.
- Monastery of San Francisco, (Franciscans): An unlikely legend holds that the monastery was founded by St. Francis of Assisi in 1217. Charles III patronized the construction of a new church of San Francisco el Grande, between 1761 and 1784.
- Santo Domingo el Real, (Dominicans): Founded in 1218 by Saint Dominic de Guzmán. Torn down in the 19th century to enlarge the Plaza de Santo Domingo.
- San Jerónimo el Real, (Hieronymites): Founded in 1464, besides the Manzanares (below the actual Moncloa Palace) by Henry IV, brother of Isabel I of Castile, who moved the convent in 1490 to the Prado de San Jerónimo. Destroyed by the French in 1810. The church was later reconstructed.
- Santa Clara, (Poor Clares): Founded in 1460 by the wife of Álvarez de Toledo, Treasurer to Henry IV. Stood behind the church of Santiago. Torn down by Joseph Bonaparte to open up Plaza de Oriente. Gave rise to Santa Clara Street.
- Constantinopla, (Franciscan Nuns): Founded in 1469 in Mayor street, and stood in front of the Town Hall. Destroyed in the 19th century.

== During the reign of the Catholic Monarchs (1474–1516) ==
- Convent of the Concepción, (Hieronymite nuns): Founded in 1502 by Francisco Ramírez "El Artillero", husband of Beatriz Galindo "La Latina". Torn down in 1891, only a street of with the name remains.
- Convent of the Concepción, (Franciscan nuns): Founded in 1512, with the adjacent Hospital of La Latina by Beatriz Galindo, Lady-in-waiting for Queen Isabel I. The actual convent built in the 19th century. The portal to the Hospital is in the School of Architecture.

== Built during the reign of Charles I (1516–1556) ==
- Nuestra Señora de Atocha, (Dominicans): Founded in 1523. Reconstructed in 1940.
- San Felipe el Real, (Augustinian): Founded in 1547, adjacent to the Puerta del Sol, corner of Esparteros y Mayor street. Torn down in the reign of Isabel II, with the suppression of male monastic orders.
- La Piedad, (Bernardine nuns): Known popularly as "Las Vallecas", founded in 1552. Torn down in the 19th century, and replaced in the next century by the Casino de la Calle Alcalá, near Puerta del Sol.

== Built during the reign of Philip II (1556–1598) ==
- Nuestra Señora de la Consolación (Our Lady of the Consolation) or Descalzas Reales, (Poor Clare nuns): Monastery of La Consolación, best known as Descalzas Reales. Well conserved, now under government ownership as a museum.
- Colegio Imperial de San Isidro, (Jesuits): Founded in 1560. In 1603, the sister of Philip II endowed the construction of the church of San Francisco Javier (later called San Isidro) and the Imperial College (Actual Institute of San Isidro).
- Nuestra Senora de los Angeles, (Franciscan nuns): Founded in 1564 in the Plaza de Santo Domingo. Torn down in the 19th century.
- La Merced, (Mercedarians): Founded in 1564, Tirso de Molina was made a priest here, and give the plaza its name. Torn down in the reign of Isabel II.
- La Magdalena, (Augustinians): Founded in 1560 in Magdalena street. Torn down in the 19th century.
- Santa Ana, (Discalced Carmelites): Founded by San Juan de la Cruz in 1586. Torn down by Joseph Bonaparte en 1811 to open up plaza Santa Ana.
- Santa Ana of Bernardos, (Cistercians): Founded in 1596; located on San Bernardo street.
- San Hermenegildo, (Discalced Carmelite friars): Founded in 1586, in Street of Alcalá. Only the church of San José remains.
- Santo Tomás, (Dominicans): Founded in 1583 in Atocha street, where the church de Santa Cruz is now found. After the Desamortizacion de Mendizabal, it served as the Supreme Court, till this was moved to the Convent of the Salesas Reales.
- María de Aragón, (Discalced Augustinians): College patronized by Mary of Aragón in 1590. Under Isabel II it became the Spanish Senate.
- Augustinian Recollects: Founded in 1592, gave name to the Paseo de Recoletos. Now the site holds the 19th century Biblioteca Nacional.
- Santa Isabel, (Augustinian Recollects): Founded by Philip II in 1589; well conserved under government administration.
- Bernardas de Pinto. Founded in 1588, at the corner of the Carrera de San Jerónimo y Ventura de la Vega. Torn down in the 19th century.
- El Carmen, (Discalced Carmelites): Founded in 1575. The church of the Carmen and the portal of the church de San Luis, in Montera street remain.
- San Bernardino, (Discalced Franciscans): Founded in 1572 in San Bernardino street. Torn down after 1836.
- La Victoria, (Minims): Founded in 1561 by the order of San Francisco de Paula. Torn down in the 19th century to open the Pasaje Matheu between Victoria and Espoz and Mina streets.
- Espíritu Santo, (Congregation of the Clerics Regular Minor): Founded in 1594. After knocking down the convent, the General Espartero built the present Congress of Deputies.
- San Antón, (Canons Regular of St. Anthony of Vienne): Founded in 1597 in Hortaleza street. The convent was used by the Scapularian order as a college till 1990.

== Built during the reign of Philip III (1598–1621) ==
- Monasterio de la Encarnación, (Recolet Augustinian nuns): Founded by Queen Margarita de Austria in 1610. The church was refurbished by Ventura Rodríguez in 1755–1557. Well Conserved today as a Museum.
- Convent of San Bernardino, (Capuchin nuns): Founded in 1617. Torn down in 1975.
- Caballero de Gracia, (Franciscan nuns): Founded in 1603 by the Caballero de Gracia. Torn down to widen the Gran Vía in 1910. The Oratory of the Caballero de Gracia, constructed in 1790, by Juan de Villanueva, remains.
- Carboneras, (Hieronimyte Nuns of Hábeas Christi): Founded in 1607. Cloistered convent (clausura) and church are conserved at Plaza del Conde de Miranda.
- Las Maravillas, (Discalced Carmelites): Founded in 1612. Only church, remains as the parish church of Santos Justo y Pastor near the plaza of 2 de Mayo.
- Noviciate, (Jesuits): Founded in San Bernardo Street by the marquess Camarasa in 1602. Became the Universidad Central, under the designs of Mariátegui and Pascual y Colomer. In the main building, is the Institute of the Cardinal Cisneros. From this convent's church comes main retable now at the Descalzas Reales. After the expulsion of the Jesuits by Charles III of Spain, the church became knowns as the Church of El Salvador.
- Santa Bárbara, (Discalced Mercedarians): Founded in 1606. Torn down with the Desamortización de Mendizabal to make housing near Plaza de Santa Bárbara. The adjacent Tapestry Factory of Santa Bárbara named after this monastery.
- Jesús de Medinaceli, (Discalced Trinitarian Order): Founded by the Duke of Lerma in 1606. The icon of Jesús de Medinaceli was rescued by the Trinitarians in 1682. The convent is joined to the Palace of Medinaceli. Actual Basilica church of Jesús de Medinaceli built between 1922 and 1930.
- San Antonio del Prado (Capuchins): Founded by the Duke of Lerma in 1609, it was located at a site in front of what is now the Congress of Deputies. Torn down in 1890.
- Santa Catalina, (Dominican nuns): Founded by the Duke of Lerma in 1609, it was located next to the Convent of the Capuchins of San Antonio del Prado. Only a street of that name remains.
- Casa Profesa, (Jesuits): Founded by the Duke of Lerma en 1611 in the corner of Mayor and Bordadores street. When the Jesuits were expelled, it became the church of the Oratorians of Saint Philip Neri. Torn down in the 19th century, name of street remains.
- San Norberto, (Premonstratensian): Founded in 1611, Torn down in 19th centuries to build the Market of the Montenses.
- San Ildefonso, (Trinitarian Order called "de Cervantes"): Founded in 1609. The church and convent are well preserved. Miguel de Cervantes and his wife were buried here.
- Mercedarias de Juan de Alarcón, Founded in 1609 in Valverde street. It houses the incorrupt body of Beata Mariana de Jesús. The convent is cloistered and not open to visitors.

== Built during the reign of Philip IV (1621–1665) ==
- Nuestra Senora del Rosario (Our Lady of the Rosary), (Dominican friars): Founded in 1626, in the corner of San Bernardo street with the Plaza de Santo Domingo.
- Nuestra Senora de Monserrat (Our Lady of Montserrat), (Benedictine monks): Founded by Felipe IV in 1641, to house the Castilian monks from the Monastery of Montserrat who had been forced to flee during a Catalan rebellion. The church of Our Lady of Montserrat remains in the hands of the Benedictines from the Abbey of Santo Domingo de Silos.
- San Plácido, (Benedictine nuns): Founded by Jerónimo de Villanueva en 1624. This monastery once held the Christ Crucified by Diego Velázquez, now found in the Prado Museum. The church is conserved from the 17th century, while the convent was reconstructed in the 19th century.
- Comendadoras de Santiago: Founded by Felipe IV en 1650. Well conserved.
- La Baronesa, (Discalced Carmelite nuns): Founded in 1650. Calle Alcalá, in front of San José. Torn down in the 19th century to build the palace of the Marquis of Casa Riera.
- Las Góngoras, de (Discalced Mercedarian nuns): Founded by Felipe IV in 1663.
- Las Calatravas. Founded in 1623. All that remains is the church. The convent was torn down in the 19th century.
- Capuchinos de La Paciencia, Capuchins. Founded in 1632. Torn down in the 19th century to open up the plaza de Vázquez de Mella.
- San Cayetano, (Theatines): Founded in 1644, in Street of the Embajadores (ambassadors), next to El Rastro Palace. The monastery was burned in 1936, only the church of San Cayetano has been rebuilt.

== Built during the reign of Charles II (1665–1700) ==
- Santa Teresa de Carmelitas, (Carmelite nuns): Founded in 1684. Street name between Santa Bárbara and Argensola streets.
- San Pascual de Franciscanas, (Franciscan or Recolet Franciscan nuns): Founded in 1683 in Recoletos. The church, rebuilt in the 19th century remains, near the Plaza de Cibeles.

== Built during the reign of Philip V (1700–1746) ==
- Escuelas Pías de San José de Calasanz (Pious Schools of San Jose de Calasanz). Founded in 1729; and torn down in 1936.

== Built during the reign of Ferdinand VI (1746–1759) ==
- Convent of the Visitation of Our Holy Lady, of Convent of the Salesas Reales: Founded in 1748 by Queen Barbara of Braganza. In the 19th century, the Palace of Justice, now Supreme Court, was moved to the site. The church is maintained as built by François Carlier and Francisco de Moradillo, with artworks by Giandomenico Giaquinto, Francesco de Mura, Cignaroli, and Flipart.

== Sources ==
- Main source
