= Răzvan Theodorescu =

Romanian historian and politician (1939–2023)

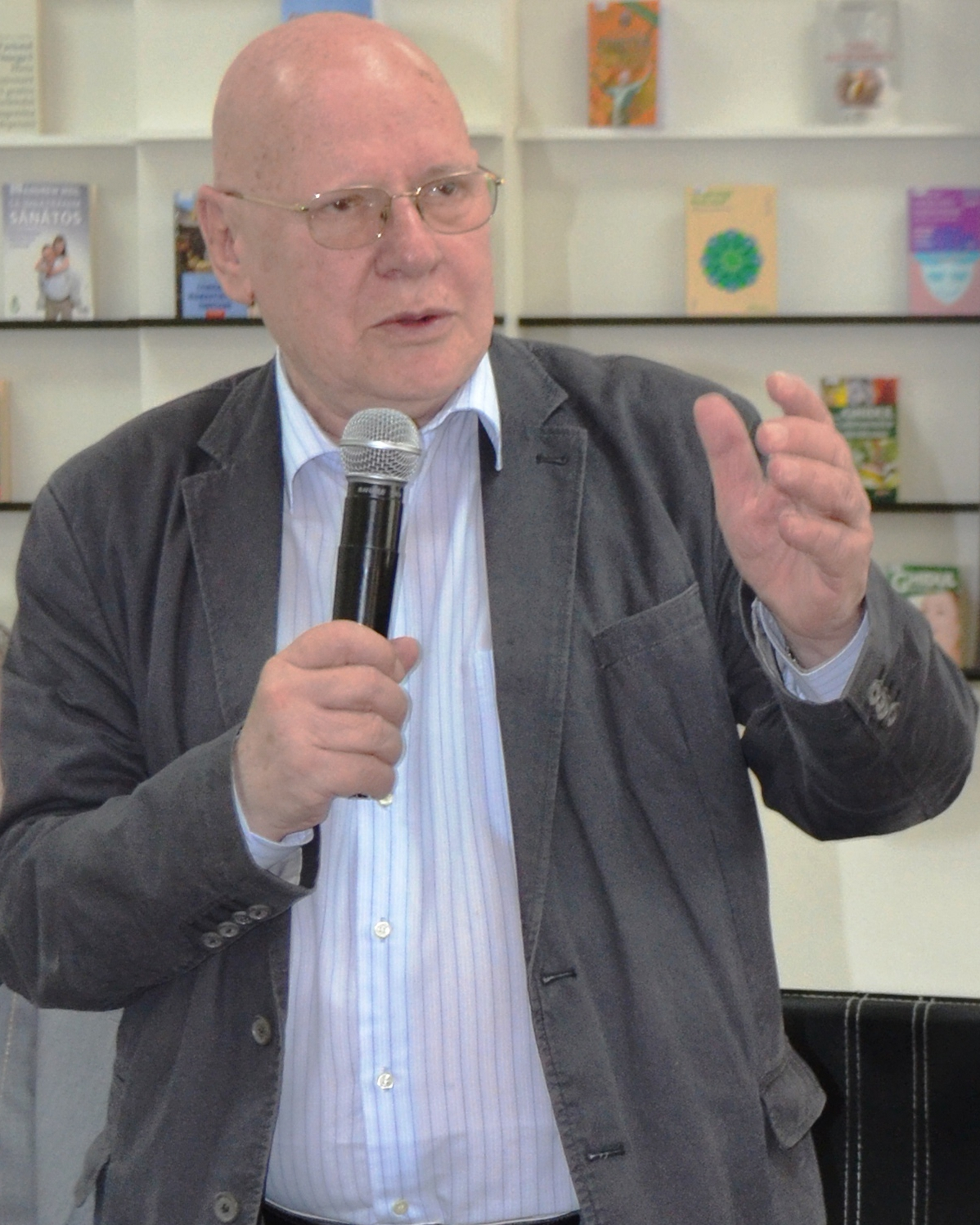
Theodorescu in 2015

Emil Răzvan Theodorescu (22 May 1939 – 6 February 2023) was a Romanian historian and politician. He researched and wrote extensively on art history in particular. A member of the Social Democratic Party (PSD), he was a member of the Romanian Senate for Iași County from 2000 to 2004, and for Botoșani County from 2004 to 2008. In the Adrian Năstase cabinet, he was Minister of Culture and Religious Affairs from 2000 to 2004.

== Biography ==
Theodorescu was born in Bucharest into a family of intellectuals. After completing secondary studies at the Cantemir Vodă High School, he studied history at the University of Bucharest from 1955 to 1963. Between 1959 and 1961 he was excluded from the university by the communist authorities for political reasons and worked as an unskilled labourer in this period. A cultural and art historian, he studied on a scholarship in France in 1968 and received a doctorate in history from the University of Bucharest in 1972. From 1963 to 1987, he was a researcher at the Romanian Academy's Institute of Art History, serving as adjunct research director from 1972 to 1977. He was removed from his leadership position after protesting against the demolition of the Enei Church in 1977, and in 1984-1985, initiated a collective protest against the demolition of the Văcărești Monastery. From 1987 to 1990 he was an associated professor at the Bucharest National University of Arts, where he became a professor in 1990, teaching courses on the history of old Romanian art, the typology of Eastern Christian art and on the history of European civilisation. He held additional posts in his field, including within UNESCO.

After the 1989 Revolution, Theodorescu headed the Romanian Television from 1990 to 1992 and was a member of the National Audiovisual Council from 1992 to 2000. The 2000 election brought the PSD into office and Theodorescu became senator and a cabinet minister. He was returned to the Senate at the 2004 election, which his party lost, and sat in opposition. He ran for a Bucharest seat at the 2008 election, but lost.

Before his election in 2000 and the return of his friend Ion Iliescu as President of Romania, Theodorescu was a strong critic of the centre-right governments under Emil Constantinescu, at one point labelling the Radu Vasile cabinet "Stalinist, Stakhanovite, totalitarian". Once in office, he pledged to continue his predecessors' "very interesting" projects, with an increased emphasis on Romania's then-upcoming European Union accession. In the religious affairs field, he continued to attempt advances on the issue of property retrocession from the Romanian Orthodox Church to the Greek-Catholic Church (which had been shut down in 1948 and had its possessions transferred to the Orthodox Church), and supported building the Romanian People's Salvation Cathedral in Carol Park. He also, in a step that was not without controversy at the time, admitted Romania's participation in the Holocaust, declaring that Romania has a responsibility toward those killed and their families, to acknowledge what happened, and to protect historic Jewish properties and cemeteries.

In 1993, Theodorescu became a correspondent member of the Romanian Academy, rising to titular member in 2000. He was its vice president from 1997. In 1990 he became a correspondent member of the Archaeological Society of Athens, and since 1998 belonged to the New York Academy of Sciences. He received the chevalier (1997) and commandeur (2003) of the Ordre des Arts et des Lettres, and from 2000 was a grand officer of the Romanian National Order for Merit. He received a number of other academic distinctions and memberships, as well as prizes and decorations, both at home and abroad.

Theodorescu was unmarried and had two children; his son Ion was found dead of a snakebite while vacationing in Corbeni, Argeș County, in 2016. Răzvan Theodorescu, aged 83, died in 2023 at Bucharest's Floreasca Hospital.

== Bibliography ==
Theodorescu wrote over 600 journal articles and over 25 books on history and art, both Romanian and European. Among his books are:

- Mănăstirea Dragomirna (1965)
- Mănăstirea Bistriţa (1966)
- Biserica Stavropoleos (1967)
- Bizanţ, Balcani, Occident la începuturile culturii medievale româneşti – secolele X-XIV, Ed. Academiei, Bucharest 1974
- Un mileniu de artă la Dunărea de Jos (400-1400), Ed. Meridiane, Bucharest, 1976
- Itinerarii medievale, Ed. Meridiane, Bucharest, 1979
- Piatra Trei Ierarhilor, Ed. Meridiane, Bucharest, 1979
- Istoria văzută de aproape, Ed. Sport-Turism, Bucharest, 1980
- Civilizaţia românilor între medieval şi modern. Orizontul imaginii (1550-1800), I-II, Ed. Meridiane, Bucharest, 1992 ; 2nd ed., Princeps Edit, Iaşi, 2006
- Drumuri către ieri, Ed. Fundaţiei Culturale Române, Bucharest, 1992
- Cele 900 de zile ale “manipulării”, Ed. Tinerama, Bucharest, 1993
- La peinture murale moldave des 15-ème - 16-ème siècles, Ed. UNESCO, Bucharest, 1995
- Roumains et Balkaniques dans la civilisation sud-est européenne, Ed. Enciclopedică, Bucharest, 1999
- Picătura de istorie, Ed. Fundaţiei Culturale Române, Bucharest, 1999
- Constantin Brâncoveanu între „Casa Cărţi” şi „Ievropa”, Ed, Rao, Bucharest, 2006
- Europa noastră şi noi, Ed. Capitel, Bucharest 2008

Government offices
Preceded by Ion Caramitru	Minister of Culture of Romania; 2000–2004	Succeeded by Mona Muscă
