= Văcărești Monastery =

Monastery in Bucharest, Romania

- Mănăstirea Văcărești
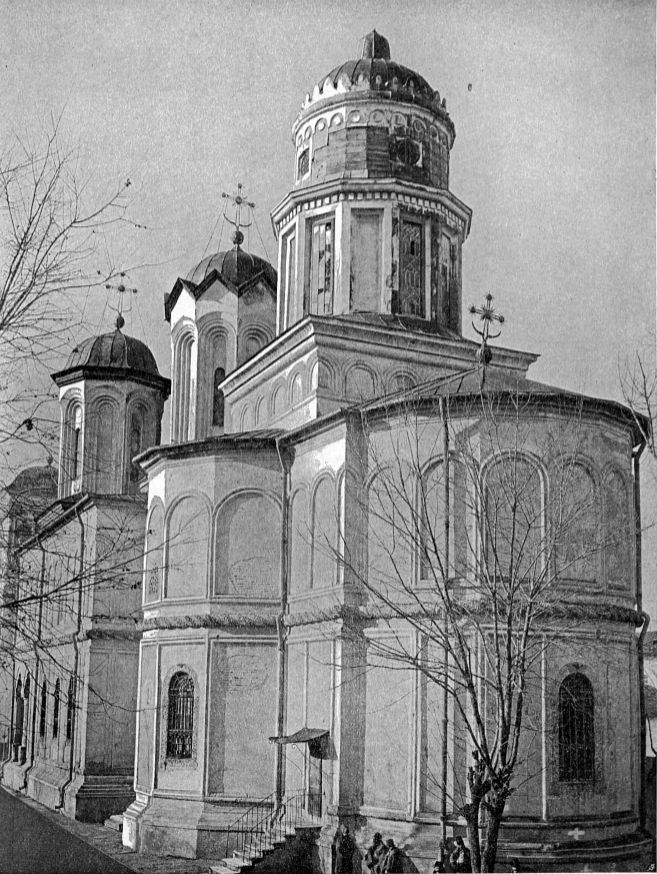
- Original church of the monastery

Religion
- Affiliation: Eastern Orthodox
- Region: Wallachia
- Ecclesiastical or organisational status: Demolished
- Year consecrated: 1724

Location
- Location: 391–393 Văcărești Street, Sector 4, Bucharest (destroyed)
- State: Wallachian state
- Interactive map of Văcărești Monastery
- Coordinates: 44.395873°N 26.1232738°E

Architecture
- Style: Brâncovenesc
- Founder: Nicholas Mavrocordatos
- Groundbreaking: 1716
- Completed: 1736
- Demolished: 1986–1987
- Materials: Stone

The Văcărești Monastery also known as the Prison of Văcărești was a religious architectural ensemble formerly located in Bucharest, Romania. It was built by Romanian Phanariot ruler Nicholas Mavrocordatos between 1716 and 1736 in the Brâncovenesc style and demolished between December 11, 1986, and early 1987 by the order of Romanian dictator Nicolae Ceaușescu.

== History ==
=== First enclosure. Under Nicholas Mavrocordatos ===
Nicholas Mavrocordatos was anointed as the ruler of Wallachia on January 5, 1716. Once on the throne, Mavrocordatos, an enlightened Phanariot ruler, lover of culture and initiator of reforms, proposed the construction of a grand place of prayer that would also have the function of a royal residence, and which, due to its dimensions, refinement and construction quality, to represent himself. The place chosen for the imposing ensemble was the crest of the "Dealul Văcărești" (Văcărești hill), as it was known to the people of Bucharest. The natural formation was in fact a promontory of the cornice of the lower terrace of the Dâmbovița River, which passes the Romanian capital through the south-eastern part.

The construction of the ensemble started in 1716, however soon being interrupted due to the abduction of Nicholas Mavrocordatos by a Transylvanian commando detachment, and resumed after the release of Mavrocordatos from the detention carried out by him in Transylvania, and after his anointing as Wallachian ruler for the second time in December 1716.

The construction of the first enclosure was finished in 1722, and on September 24, 1724, the church of the monastery dedicated to the "Holy Trinity" was consecrated. It was a large building, summing up a number of architectural elements of the Brâncovenesc art with influences of the Mountainside Baroque, considered by some historians as a crowning of the Brâncovenesc style from Wallachia.

An avid lover of culture, Mavrocordatos established in the ensemble a Greek language school, a printing press under which various important books were issued in 1741 and a library, known as being one of the largest and most complete in Europe at that time (an old surviving library catalog from 1723 confirms the number of 237 authors). Unfortunately, after the death of the ruler, the library was scattered.

In 1730 Nicholas Mavrocordatos died of plague and was buried inside the main church of the monastery. Romanian medieval rulers were traditionally buried in monasteries.

=== Second enclosure. Under Constantine Mavrocordatos ===
In 1736, Constantine Mavrocordatos, the son of Nicholas and the successor on the throne of Wallachia, added a chapel on the east side the ensemble, as well as several other buildings forming a new, smaller enclosure, in the western part of the first one.

==== The penitenciary ====
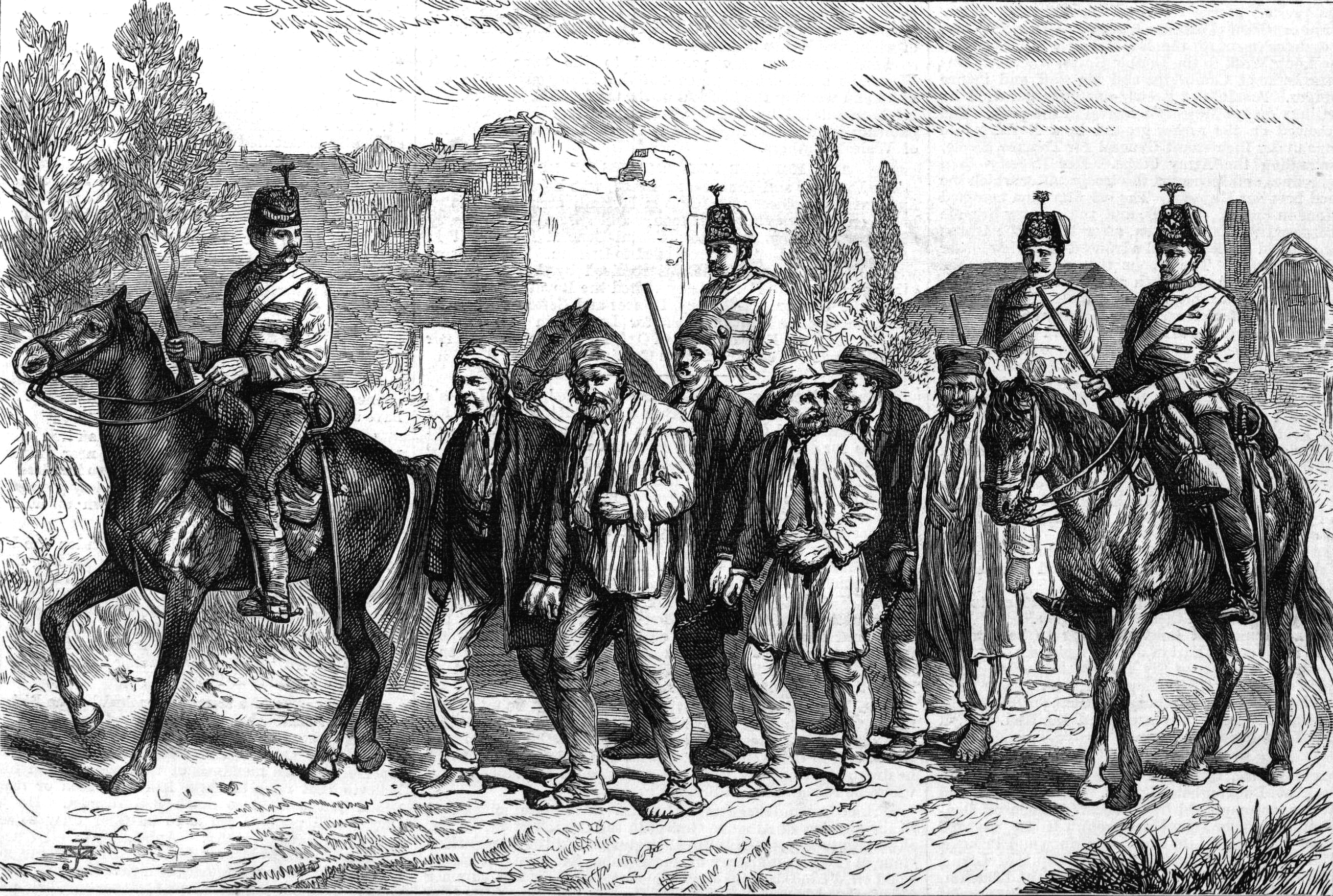
Russian prisoners accused of espionage during the Russo-Turkish War sent to Văcărești prison (July 4, 1877).

After 1848, the Văcărești Monastery became a prison for the leaders of the Wallachian Revolution of 1848. It was partially abandoned between 1850 and 1864, then, starting from the latter year, the monastery became a temporary prison, until 1868, when it officially became a public one, being subsequently remodeled accordingly.

=== 20th century. Transformation projects ===
Even before World War II, former mayor of București Dem I. Dobrescu who acted between February 1929 and January 1934, stated that the Văcărești monastery, due to its strategic geographic position could be intended as the residence of the Romanian Patriarchate, whose religious institutions were "crammed" into the "Dealul Mitropoliei" (Patriarch's Hill).

In 1973, Iranian Shah Mohammad Reza Pahlavi visited Romania and suggested dictator Nicolae Ceaușescu the idea of establishing a museum of religious art inside the ensemble. Since the Directorate of Penitentiaries, under which the Văcărești Complex was operating, was just building a new prison on Calea Rahovei (the Bucharest-Rahova Hospital Penitentiary), the Văcărești Monastery was chosen for this purpose and the restoration work began in 1973.

In the period 1974–1977, a group of specialists led by the architect Liana Bilciurescu restored the eastern part of the precinct with the church, the 1977 earthquake affecting it insignificantly. However, after the earthquake, the Historical Monuments Commission was abolished, and the restoration site in Văcărești was abandoned.

=== Demolition ===
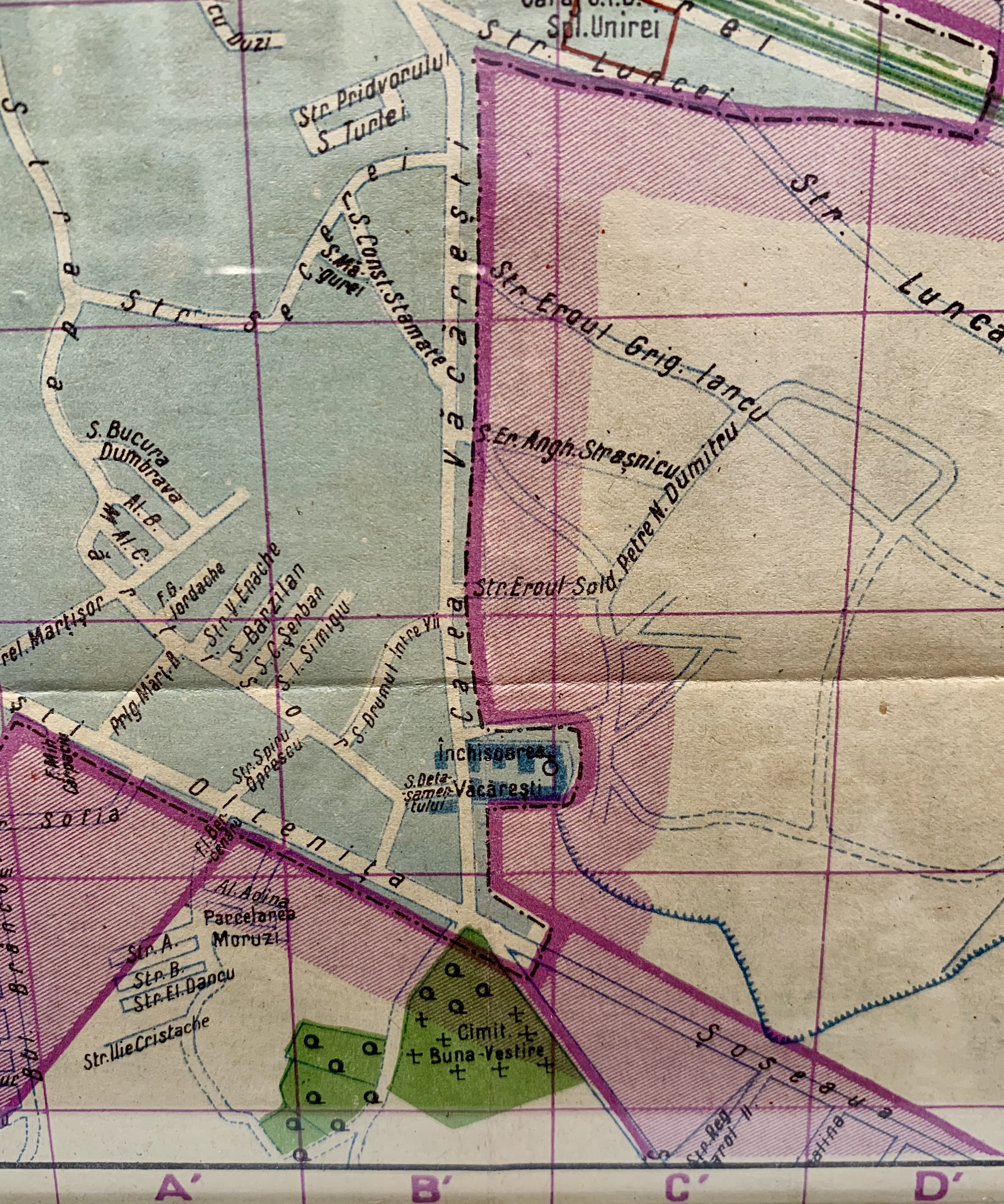
Closeup on the Văcărești Monastery (Închisoarea Văcărești on the map) in Bucharest, before being demolished in the 1980s, on an interwar map, displayed in a temporary exhibition in the Mița the Cyclist House in Bucharest.

On December 2, 1984, the construction site was visited by dictators Nicolae and Elena Ceaușescu, accompanied by Patriarch Iustin of Romania. The dictatorial couple proposed to the patriarch to build a Theological Institute inside the monastery with funds provided by the United Nations. The Patriarch refused to receive the premises until it was completely renovated, because of his concern that Ceaușescu would not order the relocation of the Patriarchate headquarters to Văcărești. Based on the conclusion, the Romanian dictator finally ordered the demolition of the monastery. Although several Romanian intellectual personalities such as Constantin Noica, Geo Bogza, Mihail Şora, Dan Nasta, Zoe Dumitrescu-Buşulenga, Răzvan Theodorescu, Dinu C. Giurescu, Grigore Ionescu, and Peter Derer signed a memorandum to save the monastery, the imminent demolition began in the fall of 1985.

In 1987, the entire ensemble was razed to the ground in order to free the land for a future complex of buildings for the Ministry of Justice, where institutions such as the General Prosecutor's Office, the Supreme Court and other courts were meant to be installed. The pouring of the foundations began in 1988, but two years later in 1990 the construction was abandoned. The monastery's hill was also entirely destroyed.

In the precinct of the Văcăreşti Monastery, shortly before the demolition, Romanian film director Sergiu Nicolaescu shot several battle scenes which implied tanks and other heavy military equipment for the film "The Last Assault" (We, those on the front line) (1986), causing serious damage to the ensemble, such as the fracture of the marble cross of one of the founders of the monastery Constantine Mavrocordatos, forcing the padlocks and iron bars that closed the chapel, as well as the altar door of the Great Church, a fact that determined the intervention of the staff of the National History Museum of Romania at the higher levels.

== Gallery ==
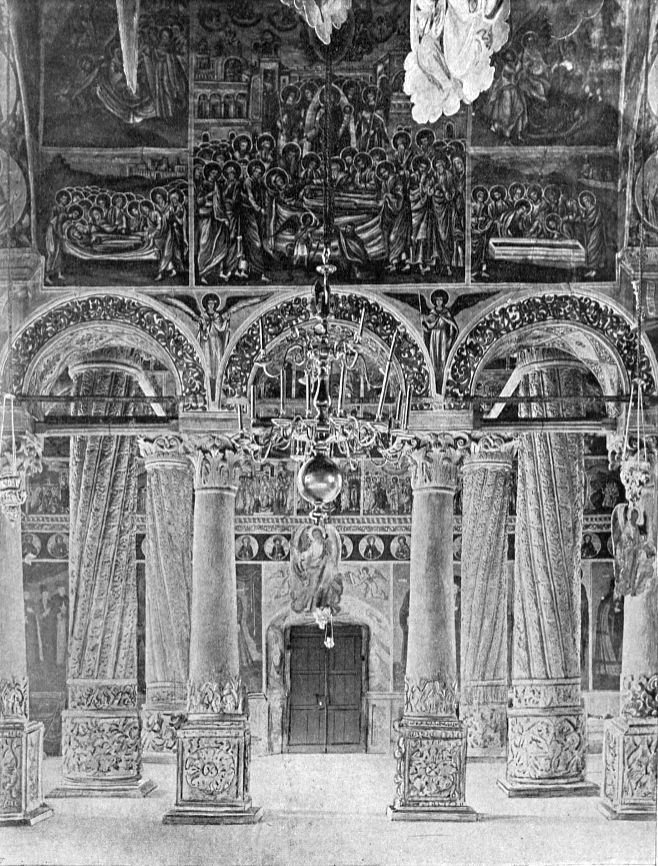
Interior of the church in 1906

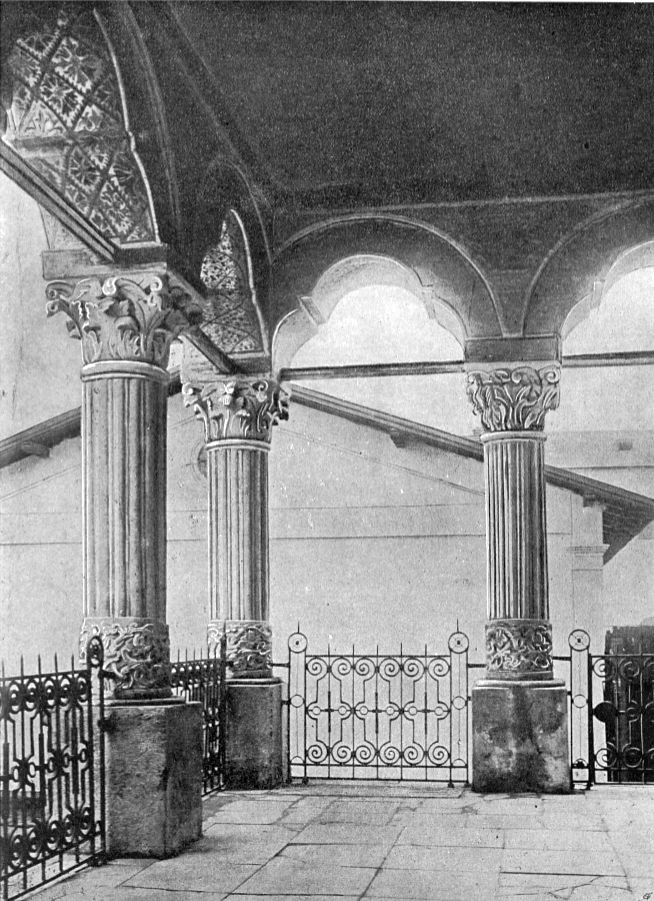
Turret of the church in 1906

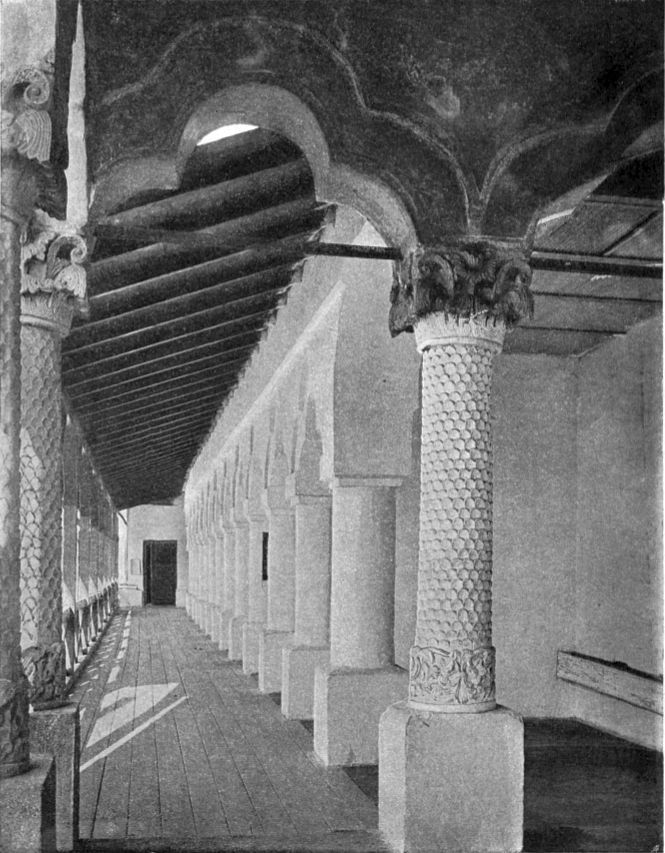
Corridor of the church in 1906

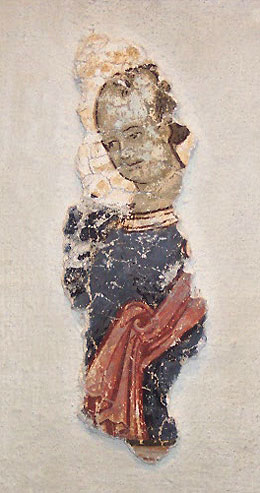
Fresco fragment saved from the demolished church

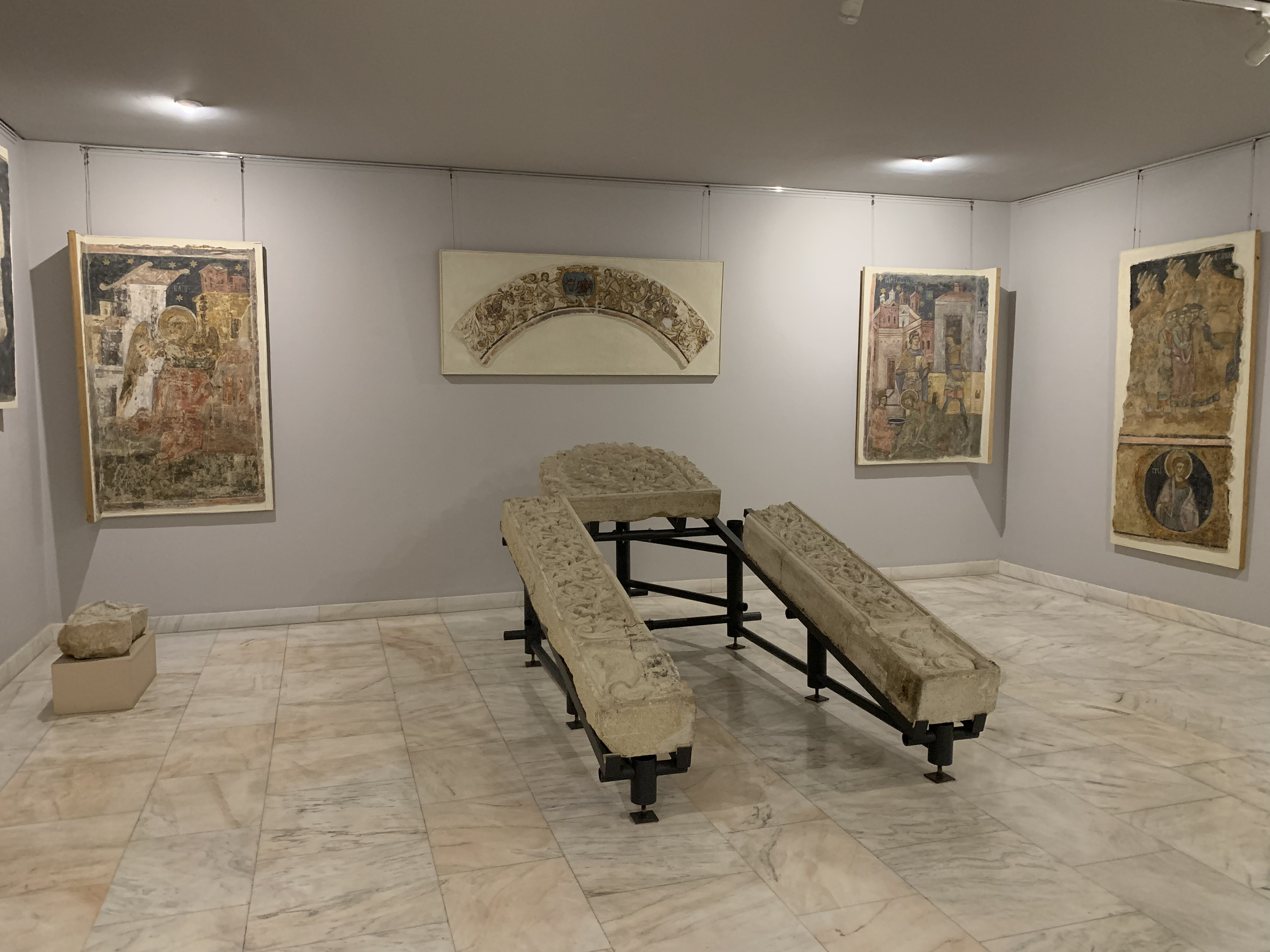
A small part of recovered items from the monastery on display in its dedicated room in National Museum of Art of Romania

== See also ==
- List of monasteries in Bucharest
