= Stavropoleos Monastery =

Monastery in Bucharest, Romania

- Mănăstirea Stavropoleos
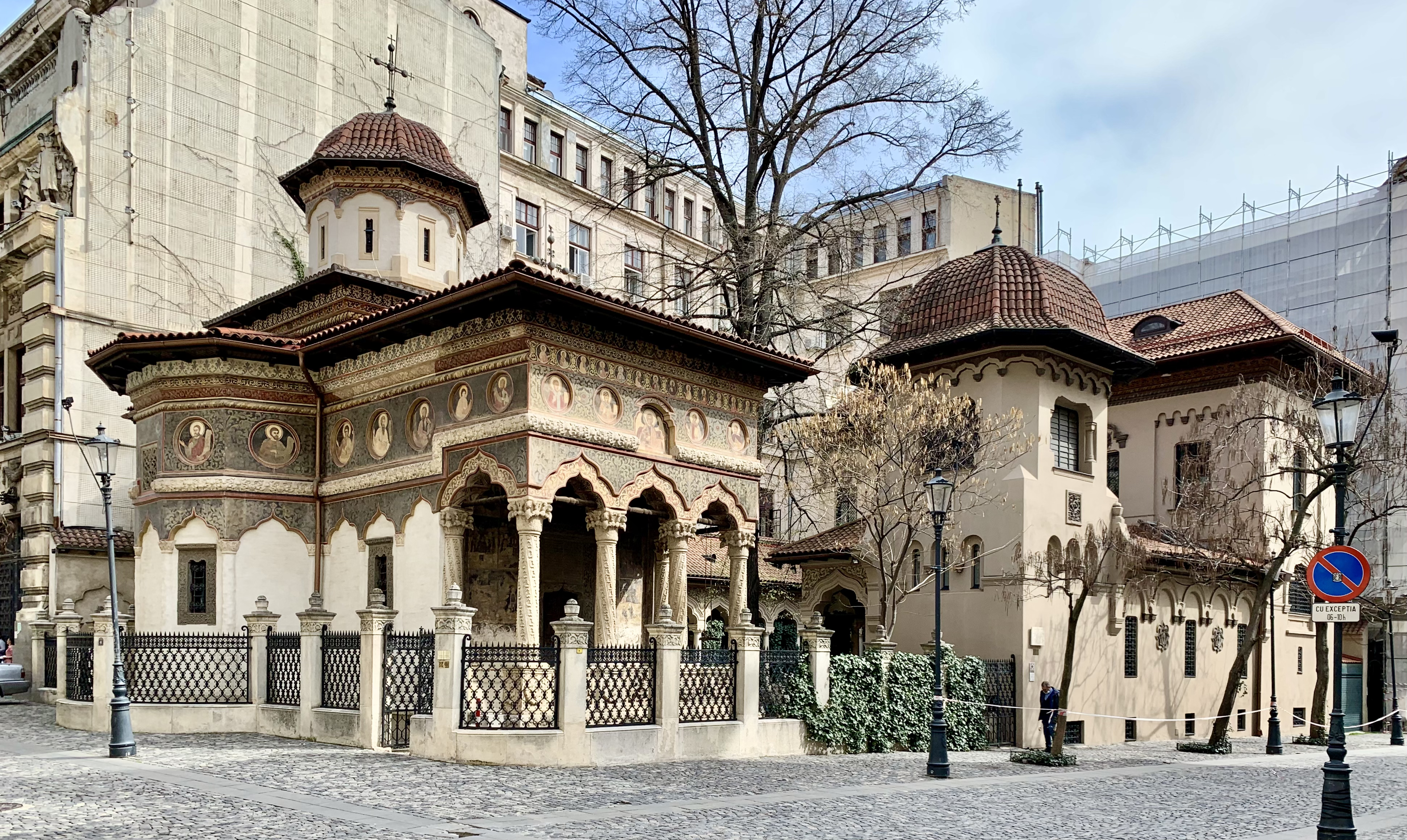
- The monastery in April 2021

Religion
- Affiliation: Eastern Orthodox
- Patron: Holy Archangels Michael and Gabriel
- Year consecrated: 2008
- Status: Active

Location
- Location: 4 Stavropoleos Street, Sector 3, Bucharest
- Interactive map of Stavropoleos Monastery
- Coordinates: 44°25′54.56″N 26°5′55.66″E

Architecture
- Style: Brâncovenesc
- Founder: Archimandrite Ioanichie Stratonikeas
- Completed: 30 October 1724
- Materials: Stone

Stavropoleos Monastery (Romanian: Mănăstirea Stavropoleos), also known as Stavropoleos Church (Romanian: Biserica Stavropoleos) during the last century when the monastery was dissolved, is an Eastern Orthodox monastery for nuns in central Bucharest, Romania. Its church is built in Brâncovenesc style. The patrons of the church (the saints to whom the church is dedicated) are St. Archangels Michael and Gabriel. The name Stavropoleos is the genitive case of Stavropolis (Greek, "The city of the Cross"). One of the monastery's constant interests is Byzantine music, expressed through its choir and the largest collection of Byzantine music books in Romania.

== History ==
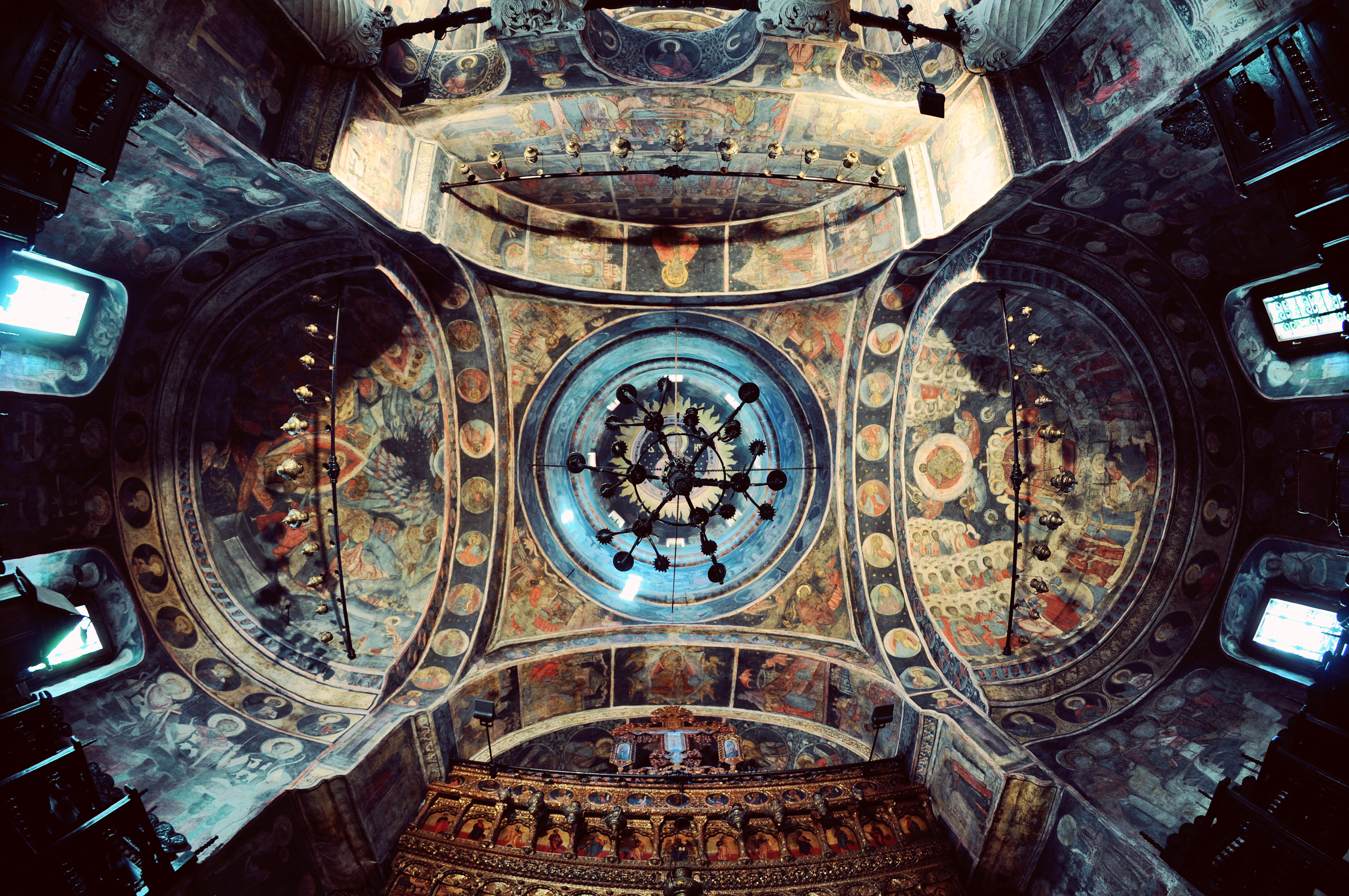
Handmade paintings and chandeliers

The church was built in 1724, during the reign of Nicholas Mavrocordatos (Prince of Wallachia, 1719-1730), by the archimandrite Ioannikios Stratonikeas, a Greek monk from Pogoniani. Within the precinct of his inn, Ioannikios built the church, and a monastery which was economically sustained with the incomes from the inn (a relatively common situation in those times). In 1726 abbot Ioannikios was elected metropolitan of Stavropolis and exarch of Caria. Since then the monastery he built is named Stavropoleos, after the name of the old seat. On February 7, 1742 Ioannikios, aged 61, died and was buried in his church.

The inn and the monastery's annexes were demolished at the end of 19th century. Over time the church suffered from earthquakes, which caused the dome to fall. The dome's paintings were restored at the beginning of the 20th century.

All that remains from the original monastery is the church, alongside a building from the beginning of the 20th century which shelters a library, a conference room and a collection of old (early 18th century) icons and ecclesiastical objects, and parts of wall paintings recovered from churches demolished during the communist regime. This new building was constructed following the plans of architect Ion Mincu.

The church has been pastored since 1991 by father Iustin Marchiș, the first hieromonk of the church in the last century. The community living here, besides routine worship, is engaged in renovating old books, icons and sacerdotal clothes. The choir of the church sings (neo-)Byzantine music (a single voice part, sustained by a prolonged sound called ison - approx. translation: accompaniment -, or tonic note), now a rare occurrence for churches in Romania.

== Library ==
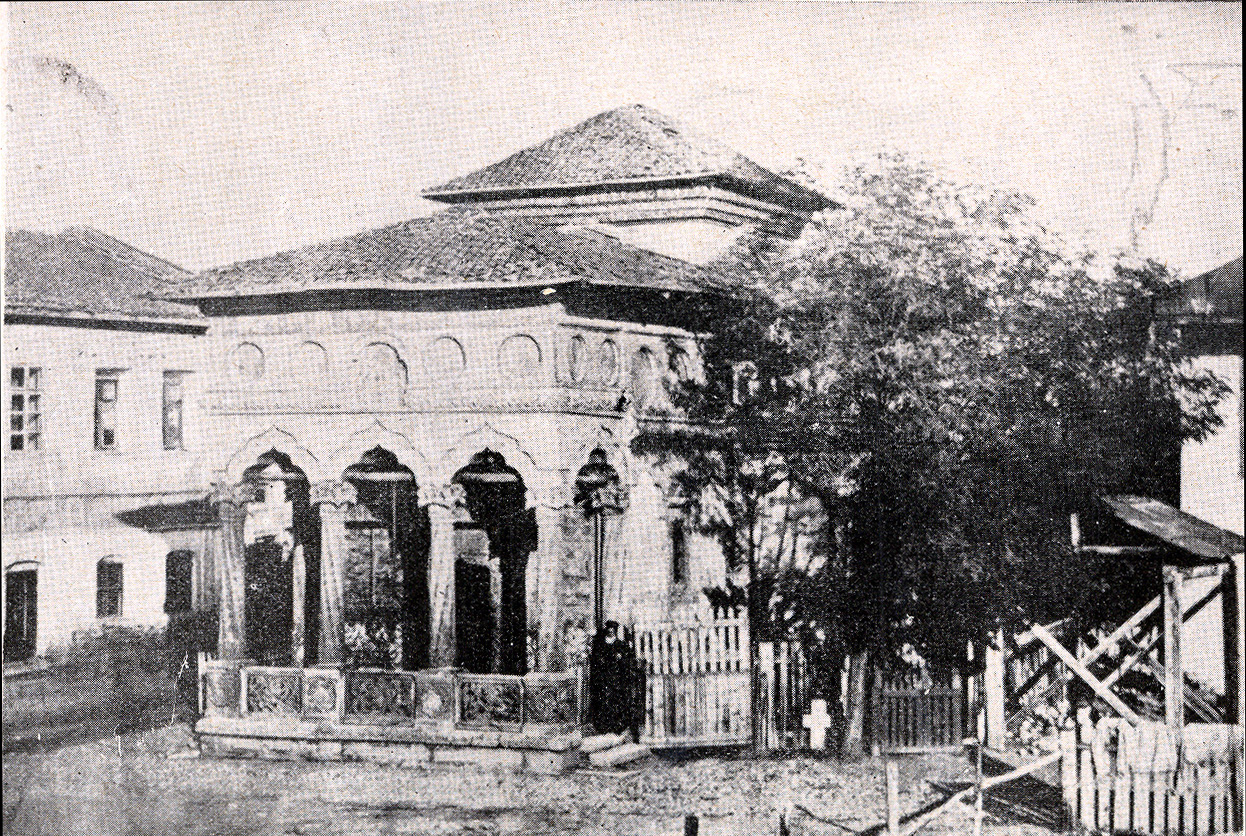
Photograph from 1865 by Carol Szathmari

The monastery's library has over 8000 books of theology, byzantine music, arts and history. There are patristic, biblical, dogmatic, liturgic, historical, homiletic, catechetic writings, classic languages dictionaries and textbooks, studies on Byzantine art and Orthodox iconography, and on the Romanian history and civilization of the 18th century. Some of the books are from the donated personal library of art historian Vasile Drăguț, former rector of the Bucharest University of Arts.

There is a significant number of old books: more than 80 manuscripts and 400 printed works. There are Romanian, Greek, and Church Slavonic books.

The Byzantine music books collection is the largest in Romania, and consists mostly of the donations of two Romanian byzantologists, Sebastian Barbu-Bucur, and Titus Moisescu.

The monastery has started a virtual library project by digitizing its old books.

== Psaltic group ==
The music sung during the offices is neo-Byzantine, based on the works of 19th century Romanian psalmodists: Macarie the Hieromonk, Nectarie the Hermit, Anton Pann, Dimitrie Suceveanu, Greek chants translated into Romanian, or modern compositions.

The Stavropoleos Byzantine Choir was created in 1994, and is led by archdeacon Gabriel Constantin Oprea who officiates and chants at the Stavropoleos Church and teaches Byzantine music at the National University of Music Bucharest. The group has performed in Romania and abroad, and they are issuing their music on CDs.

== Gallery ==
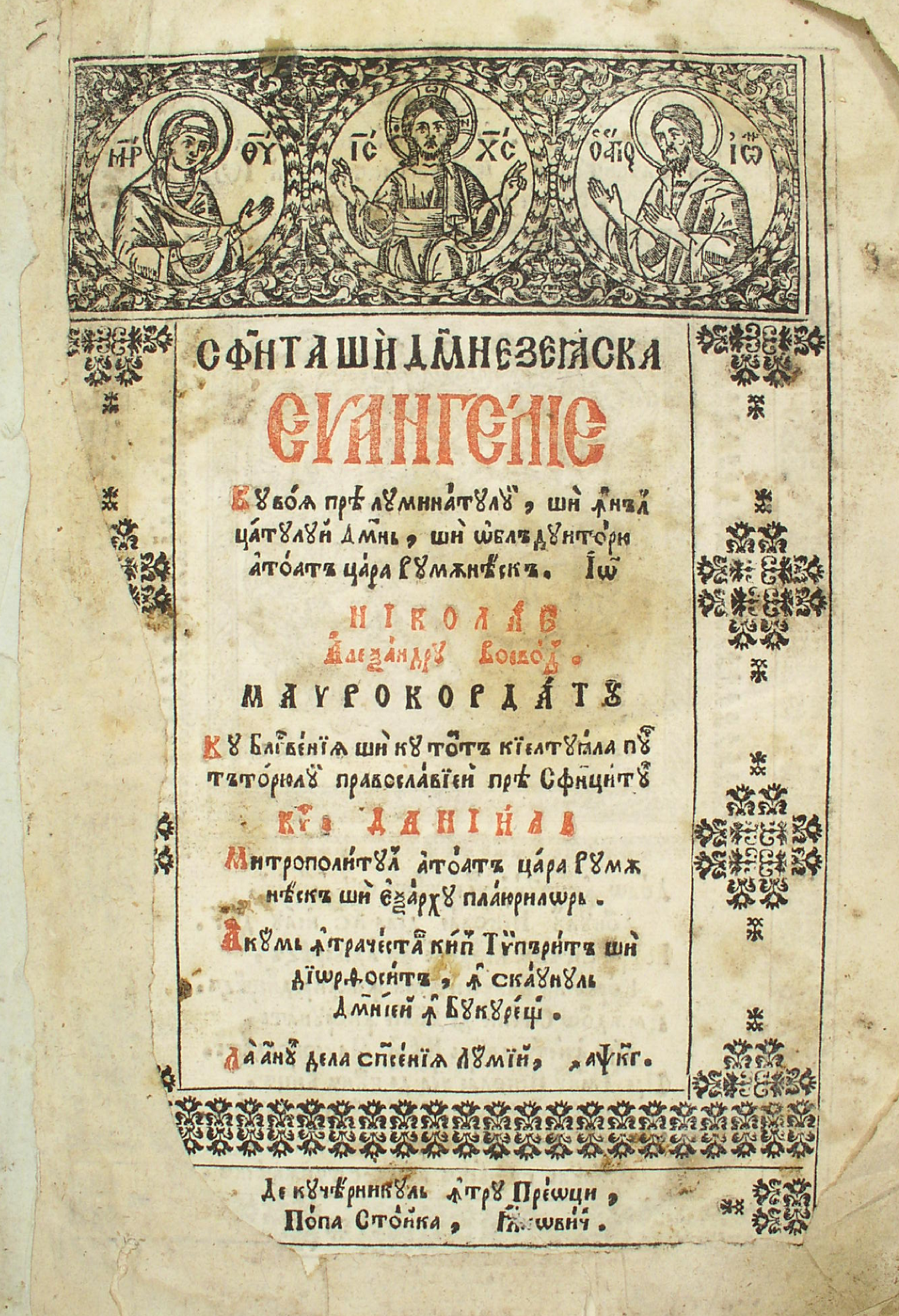
Title page of the Holy and Godly Gospel Book (1723, now in the monastery's library) printed during the reign of Nicolae Mavrocordat.

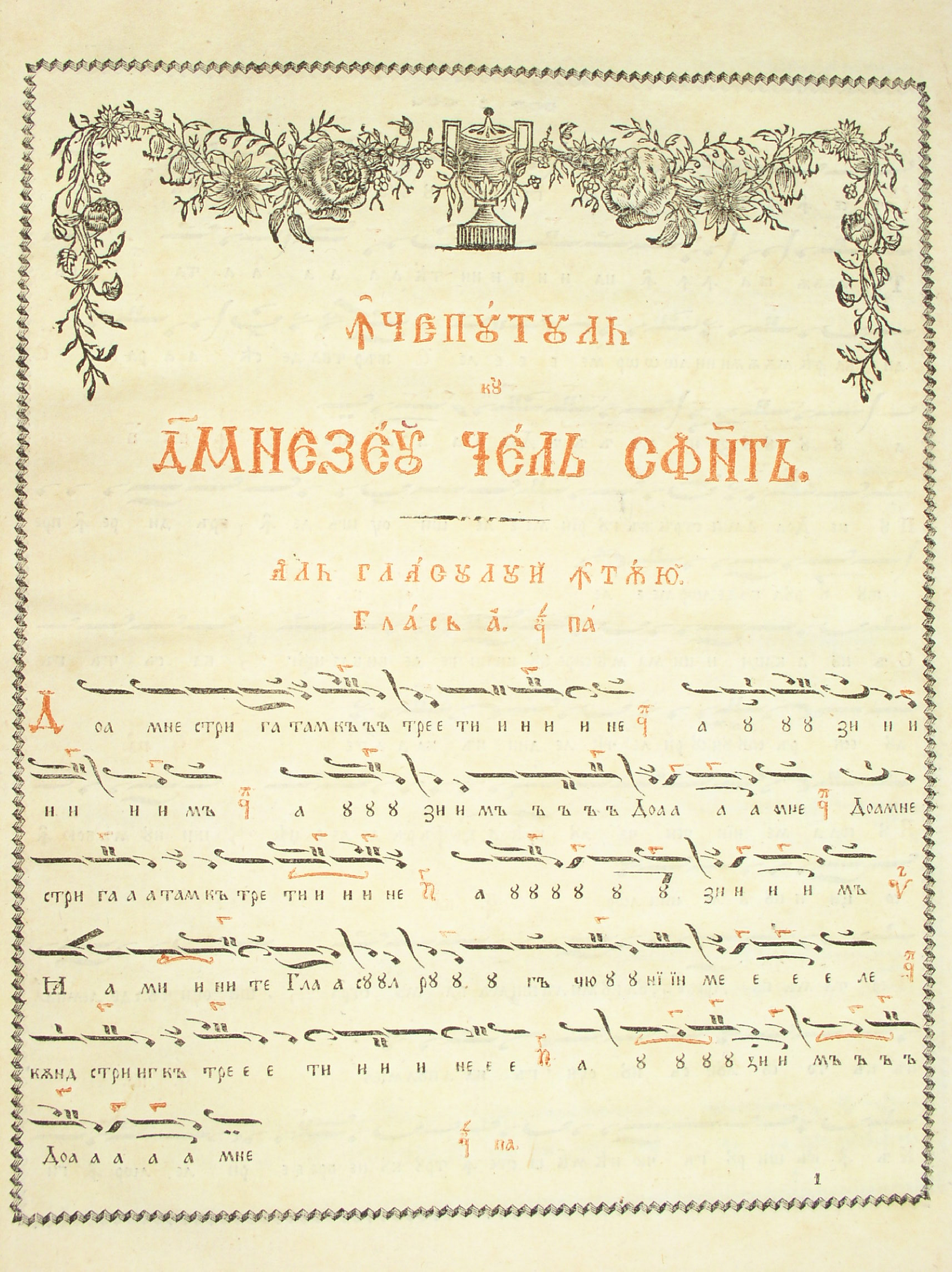
Byzantine music notation style in an 1823 "Book of Hymns at the Lord's Resurrection" from the monastery's library.

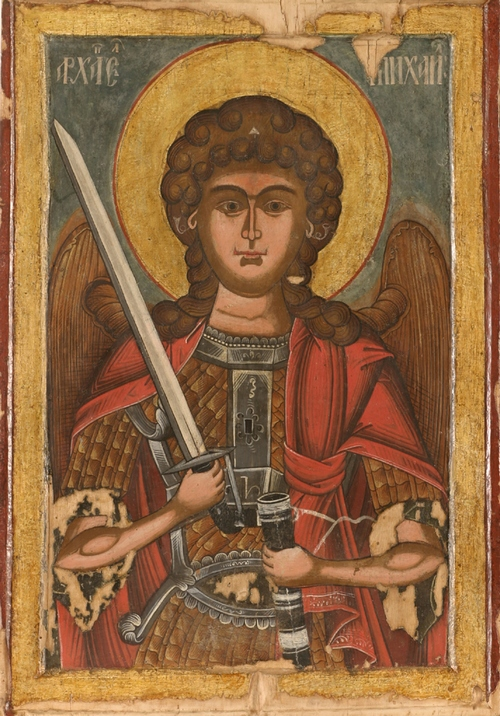
Icon of Archangel Michael (1756) in the collection of the monastery. He is one of the patron saints of the church.

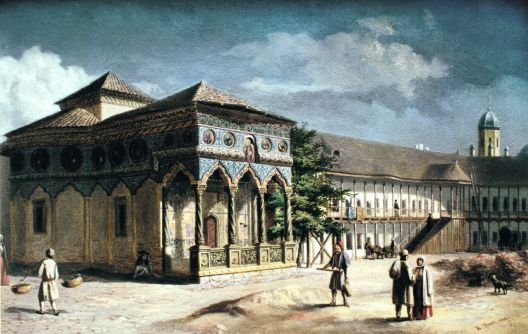
Painting by Henric Trenk

== See also ==
- Depiction of a typical Orthodox Church building
- List of monasteries in Bucharest
- Romanian Orthodox Church
