= Hronovce =

Village in Slovakia

Hronovce Lekér
- Municipality
- Flag Coat of arms

- Location of Hronovce in the Nitra Region Location of Hronovce in Slovakia
- Coordinates: 48.00°N 18.66°E
- Country: Slovakia
- Region: Nitra Region
- District: Levice District
- First mentioned: 1256

Area
  - Total: 30.96 km^{2} (11.95 sq mi)
- Elevation: 131 m (430 ft)

Population (2025)
  - Total: 1,458
- Time zone: UTC+1 (CET)
  - Summer (DST): UTC+2 (CEST)
- Postal code: 935 61
- Area code: +421 36
- Vehicle registration plate (until 2022): LV
- Website: www.hronovce.sk

Hronovce (Hungarian: Lekér) is a village and municipality in the Levice District in the Nitra Region of Slovakia.

== History ==
In historical records the village was first mentioned in 1256.

== Geography ==
The municipality lies at an altitude of 131 metres (430 ft) and covers an area of 30.96 km^{2} (11.95 sq mi) (2025).

== Population ==
Population statistic (10 years)
Year	1995	2005	2015	2025
Count	1486	1532	1461	1458
Difference		+3.09%	−4.63%	−0.20%

Population statistic
Year	2024	2025
Count	1451	1458
Difference		+0.48%

It has a population of 1458 people (31 December 2025).

=== Ethnicity ===
Census 2021 (1+ %)
Ethnicity	Number	Fraction
Slovak	856	57.6%
Hungarian	595	40.04%
Not found out	94	6.32%
Romani	76	5.11%
Czech	19	1.27%
Total	1486	

In year 2021 was 1486 people by ethnicity 856 as Slovak, 595 as Hungarian, 94 as Not found out, 76 as Romani, 19 as Czech, 6 as Ukrainian, 2 as Other, 1 as Turkish, 1 as Romanian and 1 as Polish.

Note on population: The difference values of population numbers in the table "Population statistic" and in the sections "Ethnicity" & "Religion" is caused by the use of various statistical methods.

The Magyar population was expelled to Hungary - mainly the Calvinists - on the basis of the Kosice Declaration of the Czechoslovak National-Socialist party's leader and president of CSR, E.Benes - between spring of 1945 - and the end of 1948. The remaining Magyar inhabitants were expelled for a transitional but genuine slavery (during an ice cold winter /1948-49/ in unheated waggons) to Sudetenland where from the German aborigines were thrown out.

The majority of expelled Magyars were members of the Reformed (Calvinist) community.

=== Religion ===
Census 2021 (1+ %)
Religion	Number	Fraction
Roman Catholic Church	691	46.5%
None	432	29.07%
Not found out	121	8.14%
Evangelical Church	110	7.4%
Calvinist Church	82	5.52%
Greek Catholic Church	28	1.88%
Total	1486	

In year 2021 was 1486 people by religion 691 from Roman Catholic Church, 432 from None, 121 from Not found out, 110 from Evangelical Church, 82 from Calvinist Church, 28 from Greek Catholic Church, 7 from Christian Congregations in Slovakia, 3 from Old Catholic Church, 3 from Ad hoc movements, 2 from Eastern Orthodox Church, 2 from Jehovah's Witnesses, 2 from United Methodist Church, 1 from Islam, 1 from Other and 1 from Hinduism.

== Genealogical resources ==
The records for genealogical research are available at the state archive "Statny Archiv in Nitra, Slovakia"

== See also ==
- List of municipalities and towns in Slovakia
