= San Cayetano Church, Madrid =

Coordinates: 40°24′34″N 3°42′20″W

Church of San Cayetano
- Iglesia de San Cayetano (Spanish)
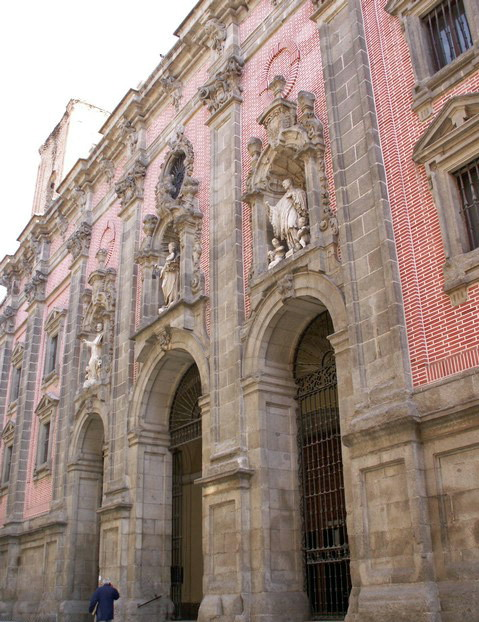

- Location within Spain
- Location: Madrid, Spain

Spanish Cultural Heritage
- Official name: Iglesia de San Cayetano
- Type: Non-movable
- Criteria: Monument
- Designated: 1980
- Reference no.: RI-51-0004425

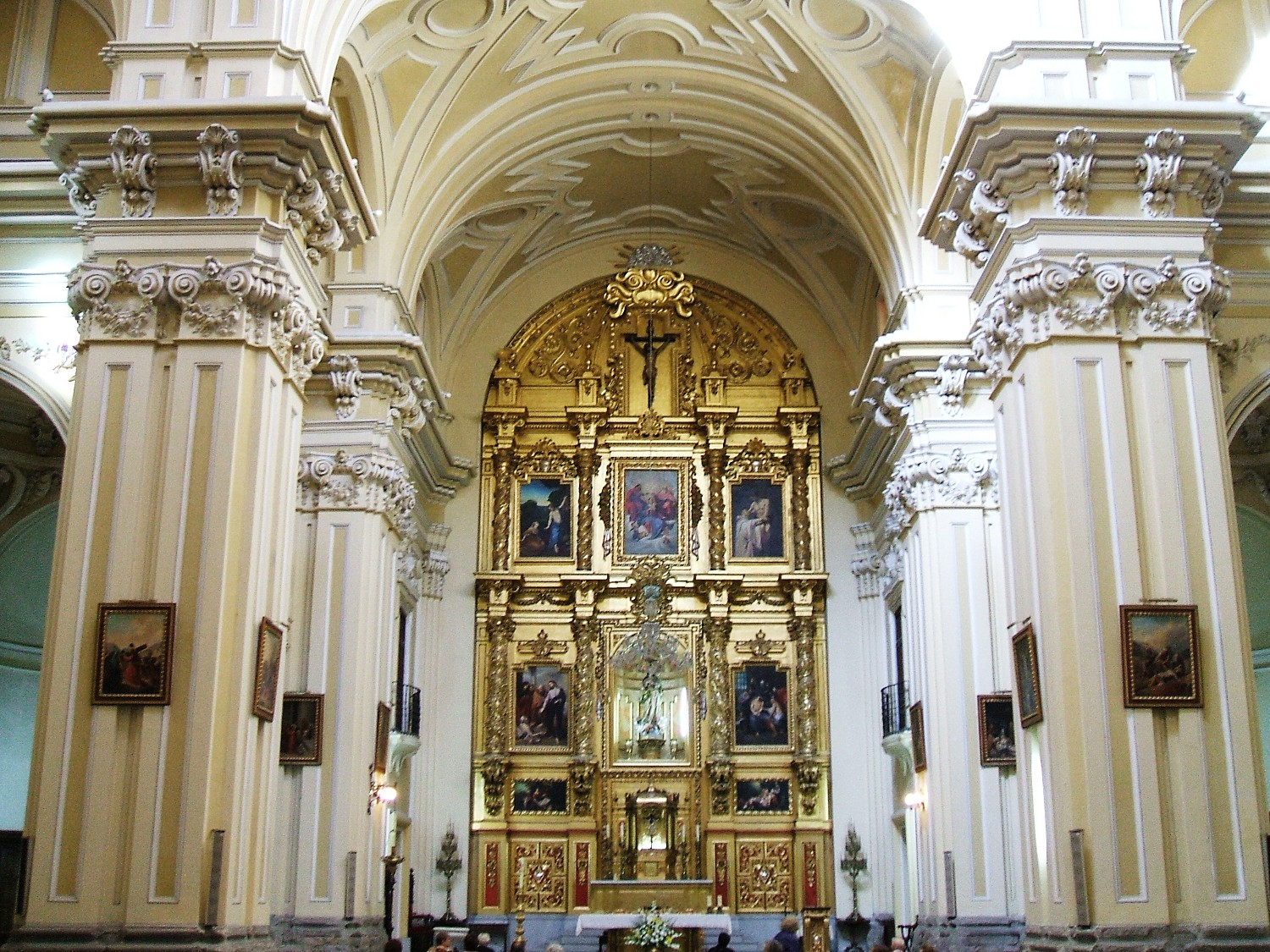
View of the interior

The Church of Saint Cajetan, known as the church of San Millán y San Cayetano is a Baroque church in Madrid, Spain.

== History ==
The present church was built adjacent to the now absent Convent of Nuestra Señora del Favor (Our Lady of the Graces). It was built at the site of an oratory dedicated to St. Mark and Our Lady of the Graces, and founded in 1612 by Diego de Vera y Ordóñez de Villaquián. Thirty two years later, the father Plácido Mirto establishes a Convent of the Theatine Order. The church is dedicated to the founder of the order, Saint Cajetan of Thiene. In 1822, the remaining monks were moved to a convent in Zaragoza, and the convent, which had suffered depredations during the Napoleonic occupation of the peninsula, was ceded temporarily to the Franciscans of San Gil. In 1836, after the Desamortización de Mendizábal, the convent building becomes private apartments.

In 1869, the church is joined to the parish of the demolished Saint Millán Abad (hence the current dedication of the church). On July 19, 1936, arson gutted all but the facade. In 1960, reconstruction began on the church. In 1980 San Cayetano was declared a Bien de Interés Cultural by the Spanish government.

== Description ==
Construction of the church began in 1669 by the architect Marcos López. Work was continued by others, including likely José de Churriguera and Pedro de Ribera, and not completed till 1761 by Francisco de Moradillo.

Moradillo's facade was built of granite, and features three arches. Over the arches are statues of San Cajetan, Our Lady of Grace, and San Andrés Avelino, by Pedro Alonso de los Ríos.

== See also ==
- Catholic Church in Spain
- List of oldest church buildings
