= Rimavské Janovce =

Rimavské Janovce Jánosi
- Municipality
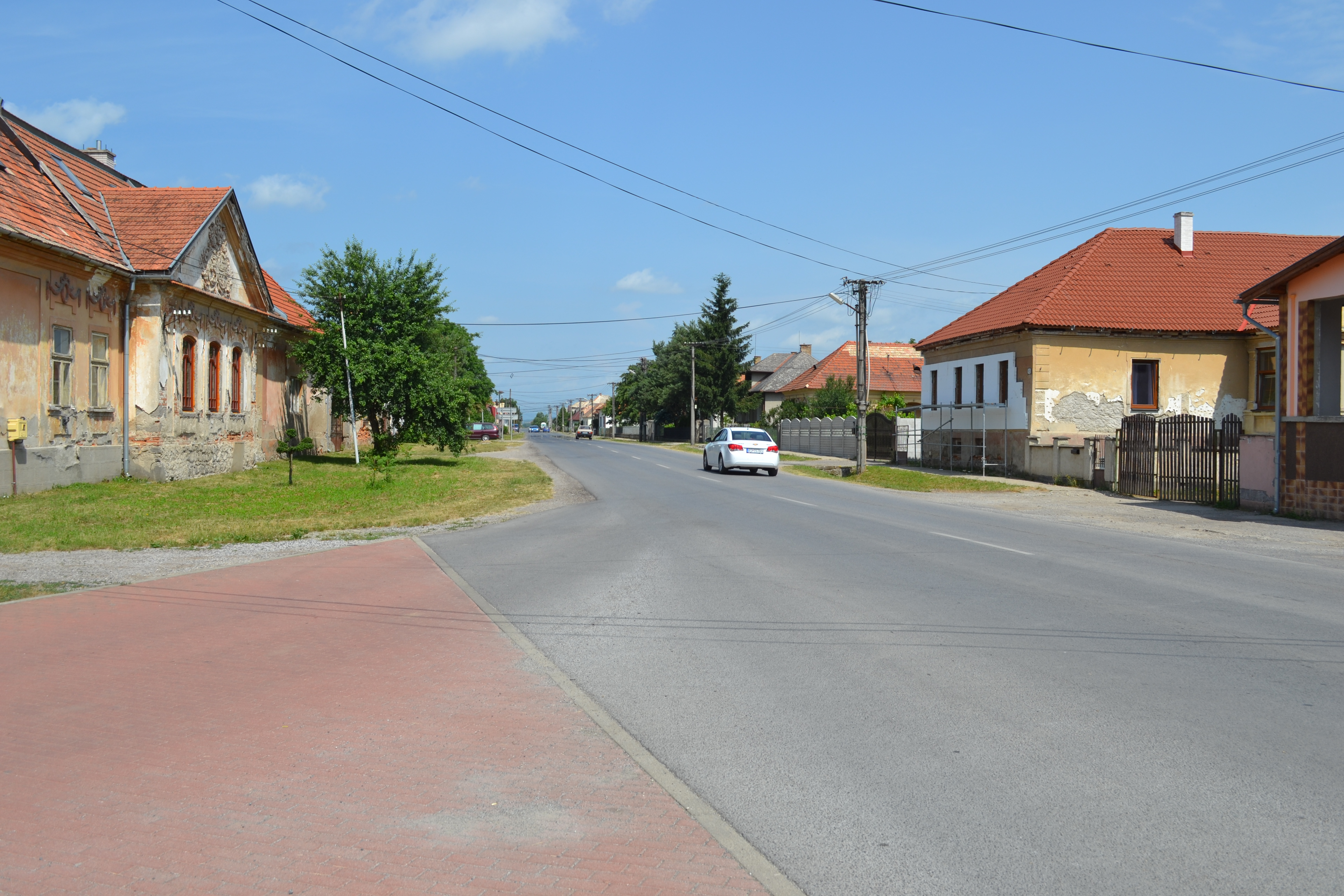

- Flag

- Location of Rimavské Janovce in the Banská Bystrica Region Location of Rimavské Janovce in Slovakia
- Coordinates: 48.35°N 20.07°E
- Country: Slovakia
- Region: Banská Bystrica Region
- District: Rimavská Sobota District
- First mentioned: 1221

Area
  - Total: 26.09 km^{2} (10.07 sq mi)
- Elevation: 196 m (643 ft)

Population (2025)
  - Total: 1,494
- Time zone: UTC+1 (CET)
  - Summer (DST): UTC+2 (CEST)
- Postal code: 980 01
- Area code: +421 47
- Vehicle registration plate (until 2022): RS
- Website: rimavskejanovce.sk

Rimavské Janovce (Hungarian: Jánosi) is a village and municipality in the Rimavská Sobota District of the Banská Bystrica Region of southern Slovakia.

== Geography ==
The municipality lies at an altitude of 196 metres (643 ft) and covers an area of 26.09 km^{2} (10.07 sq mi) (2025).

== Population ==
Population statistic (10 years)
Year	1995	2005	2015	2025
Count	1207	1232	1351	1494
Difference		+2.07%	+9.65%	+10.58%

Population statistic
Year	2024	2025
Count	1495	1494
Difference		−0.06%

It has a population of 1494 people (31 December 2025).

=== Ethnicity ===
Census 2021 (1+ %)
Ethnicity	Number	Fraction
Slovak	758	55.2%
Hungarian	538	39.18%
Romani	131	9.54%
Not found out	35	2.54%
Total	1373	

In year 2021 was 1373 people by ethnicity 758 as Slovak, 538 as Hungarian, 131 as Romani, 35 as Not found out, 4 as Czech, 4 as German and 1 as Italian.

Note on population: The difference values of population numbers in the table "Population statistic" and in the sections "Ethnicity" & "Religion" is caused by the use of various statistical methods.

=== Religion ===
Census 2021 (1+ %)
Religion	Number	Fraction
Roman Catholic Church	638	46.47%
None	472	34.38%
Calvinist Church	115	8.38%
Evangelical Church	82	5.97%
Greek Catholic Church	18	1.31%
Not found out	14	1.02%
Total	1373	

In year 2021 was 1373 people by religion 638 from Roman Catholic Church, 472 from None, 115 from Calvinist Church, 82 from Evangelical Church, 18 from Greek Catholic Church, 14 from Not found out, 13 from Jehovah's Witnesses, 4 from Old Catholic Church, 4 from Other and not ascertained christian church, 4 from Baptists Church, 4 from Ad hoc movements, 3 from Other, 1 from Christian Congregations in Slovakia and 1 from United Methodist Church.
