= Oroszlány =

- Town
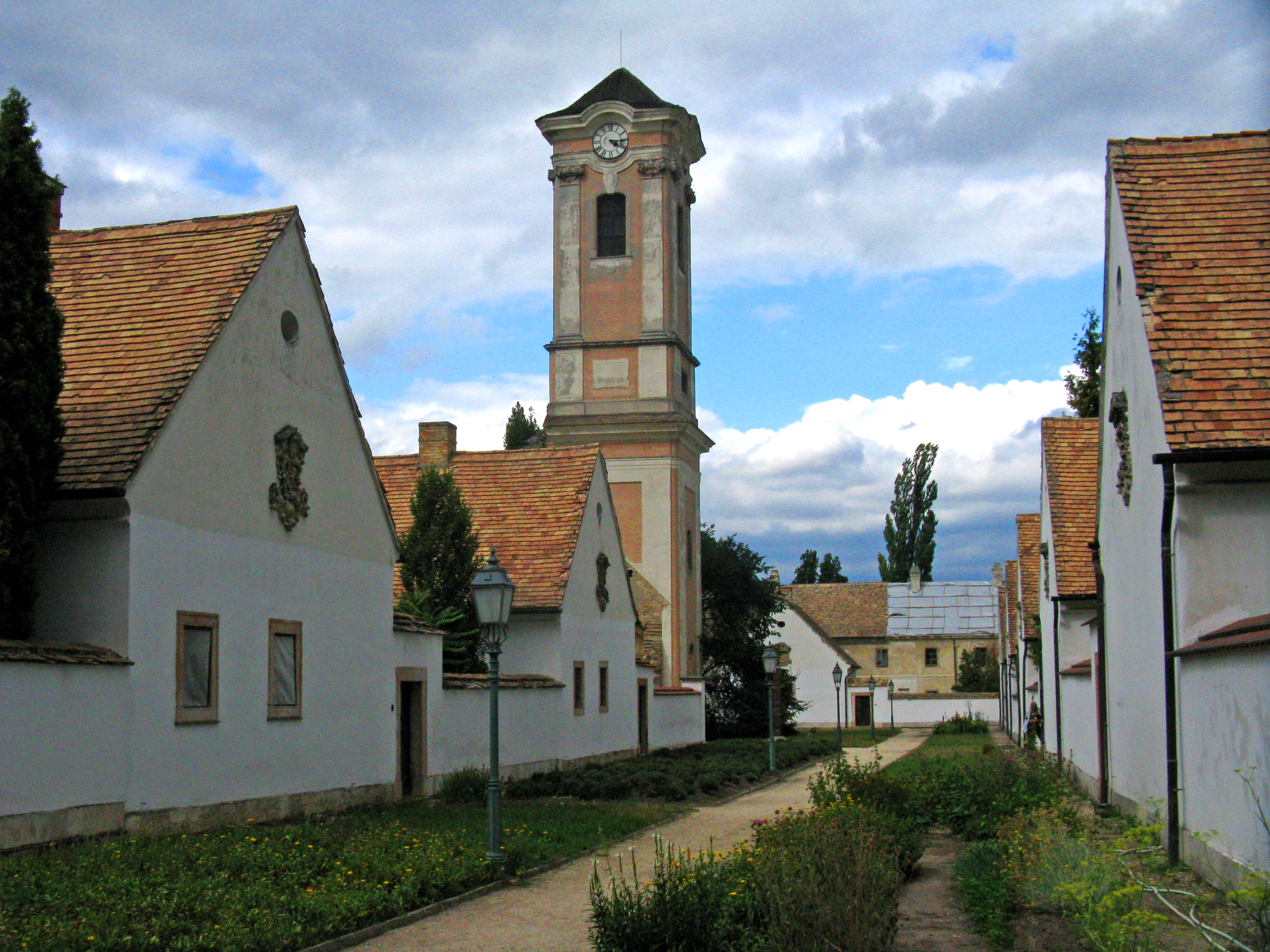
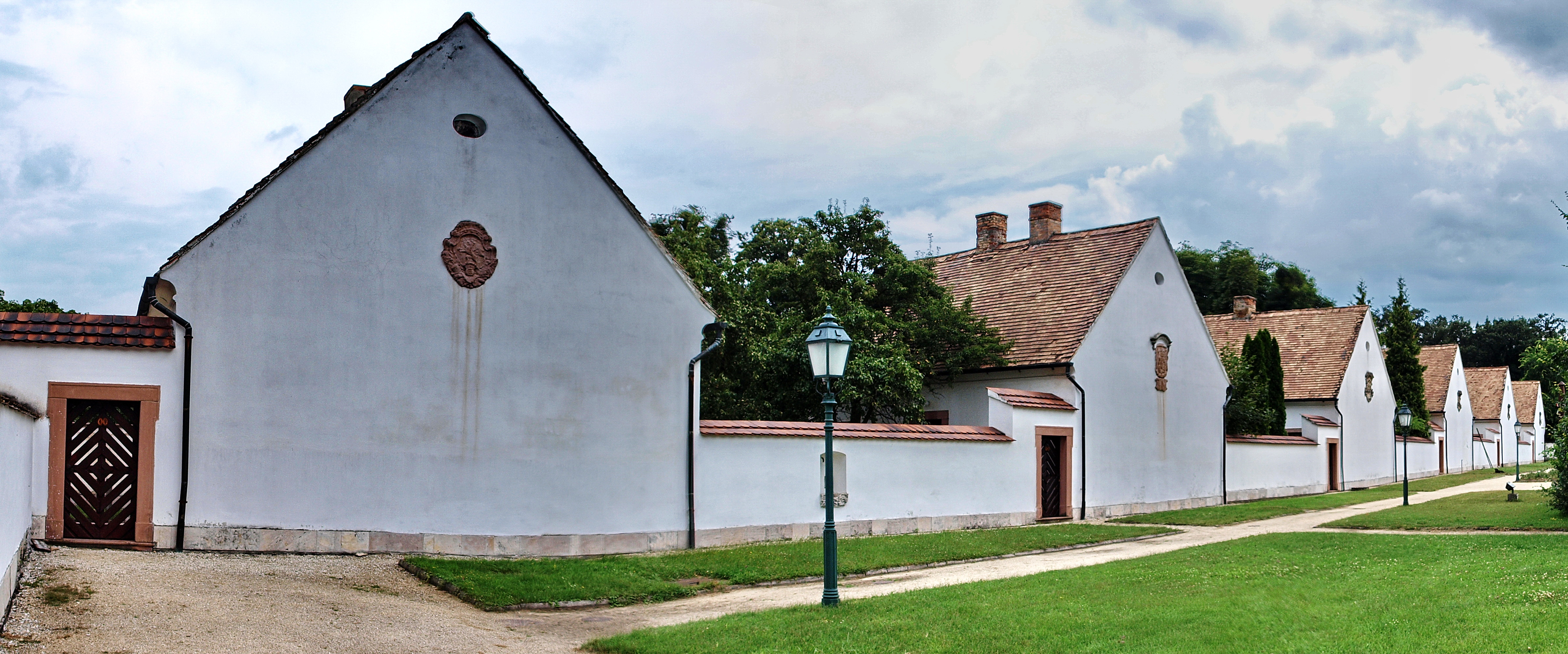
- Hermites'Houses (Remeteházak) in the former Camaldolese monastery in Majkpuszta

- Flag Coat of arms

- Location of Oroszlány
- Coordinates: 47.48361°N 18.31272°E
- Country: Hungary
- County: Komárom-Esztergom
- District: Oroszlány

Area
  - Total: 75.86 km^{2} (29.29 sq mi)

Population (2004)
  - Total: 20,034
  - Density: 264.09/km^{2} (684.0/sq mi)
- Time zone: UTC+1 (CET)
  - Summer (DST): UTC+2 (CEST)
- Postal code: 2840
- Area code: (+36) 34
- Website: www.oroszlany.hu

Oroszlány (German: Ohreslahn) is a city in Hungary, Komárom-Esztergom county, Central Transdanubia region, located on the north-west flanks of the Vértes Mountains. The city has a population of 20.487. The main tourist attraction of the town is the 18th-century Camaldolese monastery of Majk.

== Etymology ==
The town derives its name from Hungarian version of Turkic word lion "Arslan" (Hungarian: oroszlán) on the coat of arms of the Csák family that founded it.

== History ==
There was a settlement in Környe near the town already during the Roman era (Quirinum), but there are also traces from even earlier from the Avar people whose presence is attested by the cemetery remains found in 1957 and 1973.

Its first mention is from 1383 when the name Oroszlankew (modern Hungarian: oroszlánkő meaning lion/lion's stone) appears and then it is mentioned in a 15th-century deed as Possesio Orozlankew of the Csák family.

In 1536 the "Castle of Oroszlánkő" is mentioned and then it is not mentioned any more among the populated settlements during the time of Turkish occupation. What is certain is that the Turks set to fire the castles of Tata, Gesztes and Vitány in their 1543 campaign so the castle of Oroszlánkő may also have shared their fate.

In the second half of the 16th and in the 17th century the castle and its surroundings are totally uninhabited that is the contemporary name Pusztaoroszlánkő (=barren lion's stone). The area was repopulated by the then lords of the area, the Esterházys who settled Slovaks from the Pozsony (today Bratislava), Nitra and Trencin counties to the empty land. At this time, the ruins of the castle were still there but they were carried away piece by piece for building houses.

After the fall of the Rákóczi's War for Independence, the lord of the land, Antal Esterházy followed his ruler to exile so his land fell in the hands of the József Esterházy, who was loyal to the Habsburg court. At this time there were only 20 peasant families which increased to 598 living in about 200 houses by the 1820s.

After the revolutions in 1848–49, despite the abolishing serfdom the peasants had to continue to work for and serve the nearby estate of the Esterházys. Due to the dire circumstances hundreds of people migrated from the region which was deteriorated by the following World Wars.

During the communist era, the emphasis shifted towards the coalfields surrounding the town (the traces of mineral charcoal had already been discovered at the beginning of the 20th century). As a result of rapid industrialization, the city status was awarded in 1954 and the area of Oroszlány became one of the most important coal mining regions of the country. However it came to an end, all the mines have been closed down with the exception of the only running Márkushegy coal mine in Pusztavám.

On January 29, 2011 a moderate earthquake struck only a few km from Oroszlány. 26 damage cases have been reported. It was essentially light damage like cracks in walls and fallen chimneys. The earthquake had a magnitude of 4.3 at a shallow focal depth of 5 km. The epicenter of the earthquake was located in Vertessomlo, a few km from Oroszlány. The earthquake was well felt in Budapest.

== Attractions in the area ==
- Majk
- Vértesszentkereszt Abbley
- Gerencsér Castle
- Vitány Castle
- Gesztesi Castle
- Oroszlánkő Castle

== Sport ==
- Oroszlányi SZE, association football club
- OSE Lions, men's professional basketball team

== Twin towns – sister cities ==
Oroszlány is twinned with:

- Końskie, Poland
- Kuhmo, Finland
- Plochingen, Germany
- Šaľa, Slovakia
