= Majk =

Coordinates: 47.4957°N 18.3451°E

Majk (or Majkpuszta) is a small village in the municipality of Oroszlány near Tatabánya in the Central Transdanubian region, Komárom-Esztergom County, Hungary. Majk is famous for the baroque Camaldolese monastery, designed and built by Franz Anton Pilgram and later Jakob Fellner.

== History ==
In 1733, Count József Esterházy donated the land on which the monastery is located to the Camaldolese order. The monastery was designed by architect Franz Anton Pilgram, one of the most significant figures of the late Baroque and Rococo periods. Pilgram worked on the monastery until his death in 1761. After Pilgram's death architect Jakob Fellner finished the church in 1770. When completed, there were 17 different hermitages (small houses) for each of the monks, who took vows of silence. Each hermitage was sponsored by a noble family and their coats of arms are still visible on the hermitages today. The Camaldolese monks would remain at Majk until 1782 when Emperor Joseph II issued a decree dissolving all religious orders he did deem to be "useful". The monks were forced to leave and all the left behind furniture and goods were auctioned off or moved to other churches. The Esterházy family reclaimed the property in 1860 and transformed the main administrative building, the "Forester's House", into a Baroque hunting lodge. During this time, the Church had been damaged by lightning and neglect and was then partially demolished. Only the bell tower was preserved. The bell tower is the only part of the Church is still standing today. The property served as a resort for the aristocracy and numerous parties were held on and around the property. During WW1, the monastery was used as a military hospital. During the Interwar Period, the Esterházy family, specifically Count Móric Esterhazy, made Majk their primary residence. The grounds were again used as a gathering place for the elite and intellectuals. In the latter years of WW2, the Germans occupied Majk monastery and used the bell tower as an excellent observation tower to monitor Soviet troop movements toward Oroszlany. As the Red Army pushed closer to Oroszlany and subsequently Majk, the Esterházy family was forced to flee. When Majk was taken by the Soviets, the Soviet soldiers looted the monastery. They used historical furniture as firewood, devastated the interiors, and destroyed/scattered the library and archives. In the final months of the war, Majk was once again turned into a field hospital, this time for the Red Army. After WW2, the state took control of the old monastery. In the years of the Hungarian People's Republic, the Hungarian USSR satellite state, the grounds would be used as a hospital, a school, and the 17 hermitages were made into state-owned apartments for local workers. After the fall of communism, work began to restore Majk to its 18th century form so it could be made into a museum and preserved as a cultural and religious site. The clock tower of the former church was restored in the early 1990s and the main building, the former administrative building then Esterházy hunting lodge, and 17 hermitages were restored in the 2010s. Today, Majk is restored to its former glory as a beautiful, peaceful monastery. It is open to the public as a museum. Visitors can enter the main building, which has exhibits showing the different eras of the grounds from construction to present day. The main building also includes a small chapel. Visitors can also climb to the top of the bell tower and get panoramic views of the surrounding countryside.

== Celli Szűz Mária Chapel (Chapel of the Virgin Mary of Mariazell) ==
There is a small chapel a very short distance down the dirt road that leads up to the Majk Monastery. This little white chapel is on a small hill overlooking the Majk lake. It was designed by architect Franz Anton Pilgram, the original designer and architect of the Majk monastery. This chapel, built in 1757, served the people of the local village, Majkpuszta, and visiting pilgrims. The chapel was consecrated in honor of the Virgin Mary of Mariazell, a world famous pilgrimage site in Austria. The stone carvings in the chapel were made by sculptor János György Mess. Today, the chapel has been neglected and the outside and inside walls look old and worn. There was an information board next to the chapel, but unfortunately it was smashed/destroyed.

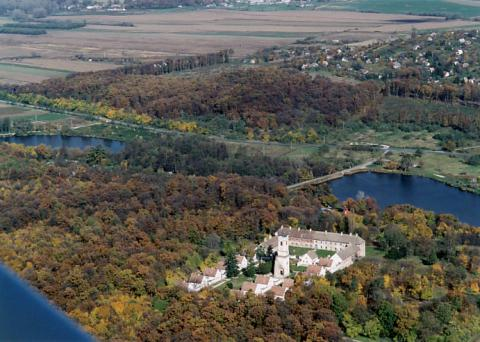
The monastery of Majk

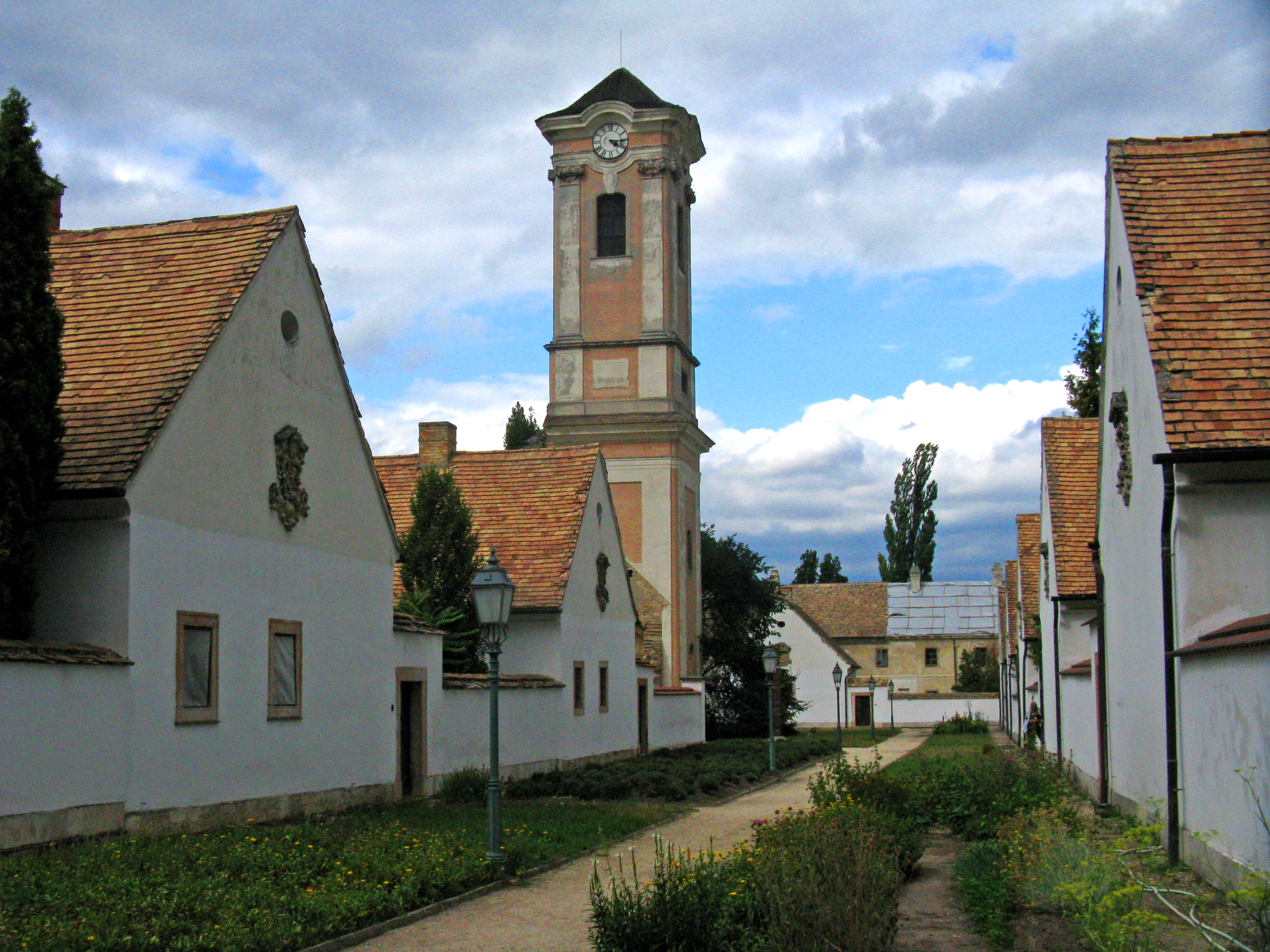

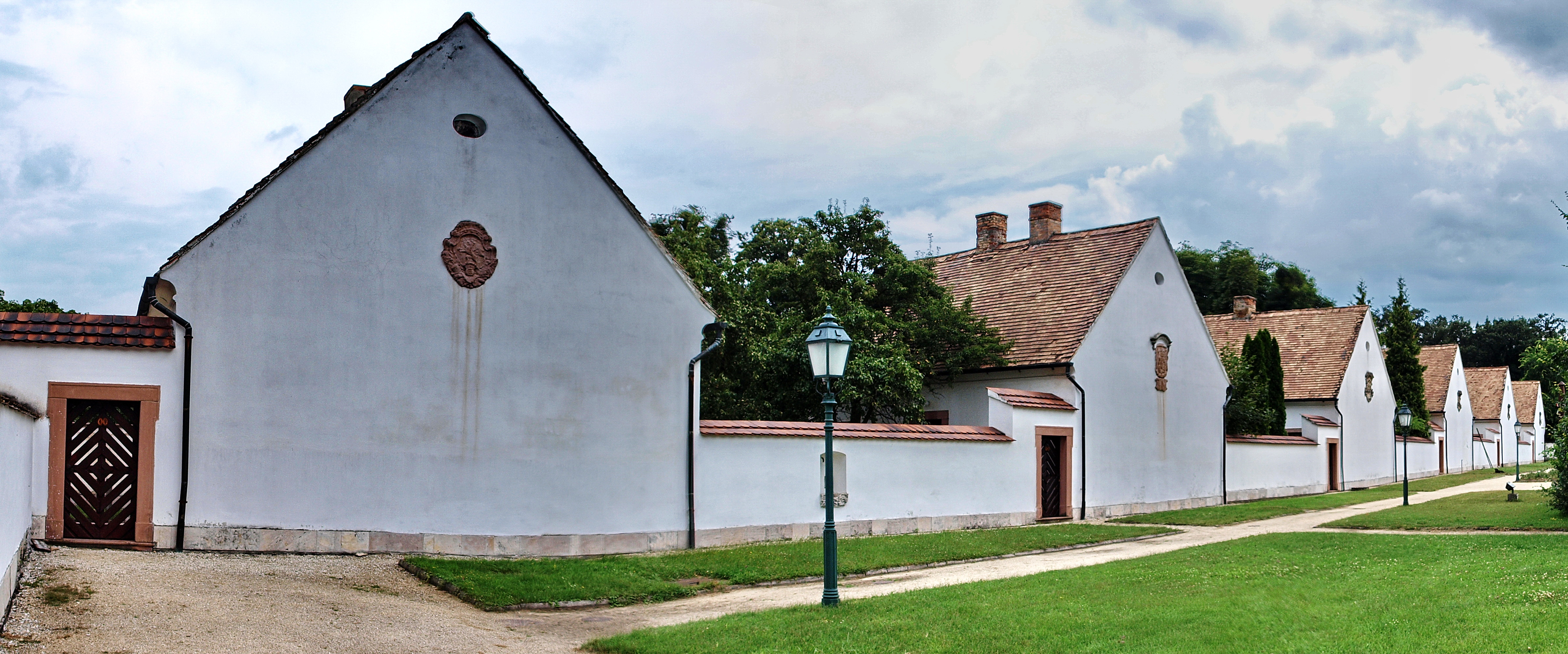
Hermites'Houses (Monks'Cells) in the former Camaldolese monastery (18th century)
