= Discalced Mercedarians =

Catholc mendicant Religious Order

The Discalced Mercedarians (Latin: Ordo Frati Excalceatorum de B.M.V. de Mercede; Spanish: Orden de Descalzos de Nuestra Señora de la Merced) are members of a mendicant order, which is a reform branch which developed in the 17th century of the Mercedarian Order, founded in the 12th century primarily to assist Christians who had been taken prisoner by Muslim armies or pirates. They use the postnominal initials O.M.D.

== History ==
=== The origins of reform ===
The Great Western Schism in the Catholic Church (1378-1417) was a period of grave crisis for the stability of life within religious orders. During this period, there developed a movement within the Mercedarian Order to recover the contemplative element of their way of life. It came about in several monasteries of the Order where the Rule of St. Augustine was followed more strictly, the chief proponent of which was the Mercedarian monastery in Valladolid, whose prior was John of Granada.

Prior John drew up a proposed renewal of the Order which gained the approval of Antonio Caxal, the Master General of the Order, on 24 September 1414. The reform spread and was embraced by many monasteries of the Order, such as Our Lady of Refuge, near Madrid, which became a great center of spirituality.

=== A new Order ===
New instances of renewal developed in the Order after the Council of Trent, in the 16th century. A Mercedarian friar, Juan Bautista González Alcázar (1554-1616), attempted to establish a monastery following this stricter life in Peru during that period, hoping that the lack of established forms of monastic life in the New World would be a more fertile field for this. This effort did not meet with success, however, and he returned to Spain in 1602. There he was appointed the spiritual director of the Monastery of the Refuge, which he then attempted to reform, introducing a more austere form of life than that followed even by the stricter communities of the Order. The Master General of that period, Alonso Monroy, supported the initiative and gave Friar Ferdinando di Santiago the task of drawing up a set of statutes which would supplement the Rule of Life of the Order. This document was adopted on 27 April 1603 by the Provincial Chapter of Castile, held that year at Guadalajara.

On 8 May 1603, González, together with five other friars, formally committed themselves to the "Recollection" (or Reform), which had as its first base the monastery in Almoraima. He then adopted the new name of John Baptist of the Blessed Sacrament. Fearing a major spit in the Order, in 1606 Pope Clement VIII forbade the reform; he consented, though, to establishing some monasteries in each province of the Order to a stricter life. Despite this ruling, when the next General Chapter was held in Madrid, it ratified the statutes of the reform. The new pope, Paul V, gave his approval on 6 August 1607.

The Reform movement saw a quick expansion and within ten years there were 7 monasteries following the Reform in Castile, 10 in Andalusia and 8 in Sicily. On 26 November 1621 Pope Gregory XV authorized the Discalced Mercedarian friars (as the followers of the Reform had come to be called) to elect their own Vicar General, subject only to the Master General. He further prohibited those who followed the original pattern of life from interfering with the new branch of the Order.

=== Modern era ===
The Discalced Mercedarian friars suffered severely under the religious suppression of the late 18th century. Their revival did not begin for nearly a century, with the opening of a new house for candidates to the Order in 1886 in Toro, Zamora.

== Current status ==
The goal of the Order is instruction for the preservation of the Catholic faith. The friars commit themselves to pastoral care, as well as to giving spiritual direction to nuns of enclosed religious orders. Additionally they work with prisoners and the sick in centers of medical care.

The friars are present in Spain and in the Dominican Republic. The General Motherhouse is in Las Rozas, near Madrid.

As of 2008, the Order consisted of 11 monasteries with 47 friars, 38 of whom were priests.
