= List of monasteries in Bucharest =

This is a list of monasteries in Bucharest.

== Extant monasteries ==
Name	Year founded
Antim Monastery	1713
Christiana Monastery	1992
Darvari Monastery	1834
Dormition of the Theotokos Monastery	1964
Holy Family Monastery	2001
Plumbuita Monastery	1560
Radu Vodă Monastery	c. 1570

== Historical monasteries ==
Name	Year founded	Year disbanded
Cașin Monastery	1938	?
Chiajna Monastery	c. 1780	?
Colțea Monastery		
Cotroceni Monastery	1682	1863
Mărcuța Monastery	1587	?
Mihai Vodă Monastery	1594	1985
Schitu Măgureanu		
Stavropoleos Monastery	1724	?
Sărindar Monastery	c. 1590	1893
Saint Sava Monastery		
Schitul Maicilor Monastery		
St. Ioan Nou Monastery		
St. George's Monastery		
St. Spiridon's Old Monastery	1746	
Văcărești Monastery	1716	1986
Zlătari Monastery	c. 1705	1888
