= Order of Hospitaller Canons Regular of St Stephen =

The Order of Hospitaller Canons Regular of St Stephen or Stephanites was a religious institution set up by King Géza II of Hungary (1141–1162). The order was organized around a hospital that the king had earlier established in Esztergom (at that time an important station on the inland pilgrim route to the Holy Land) in honor of King St Stephen I of Hungary. They also administered a hospital at Budafelhévíz.

== Sources ==
- Engel, Pál (2001). The Realm of St Stephen: A History of Medieval Hungary, 895–1526. I. B. Tauris. ISBN 978-1-85043-977-6.
- Hunyadi, Zsolt (2010). The Hospitallers in the Medieval Kingdom of Hungary, c. 1150–1387. International Society for Encyclopedia of Church History in Hungary & Central European University. ISBN 978-963-9662-44-5.
- Berend, Nora; Laszlovszky, József; Szakács, Béla Zsolt (2007). The kingdom of Hungary. In: Berend, Nora (2007); Christianization and the Rise of Christian Monarchy: Scandinavia, Central Europe and Rus', c. 900–1200; Cambridge University Press; ISBN 978-0-521-87616-2.
