= Cathedral of Christ the Saviour (Samara) =

Orthodox cathedral in Samara, Russia

- Cathedral of Christ the Saviour
- Храм Христа Спасителя
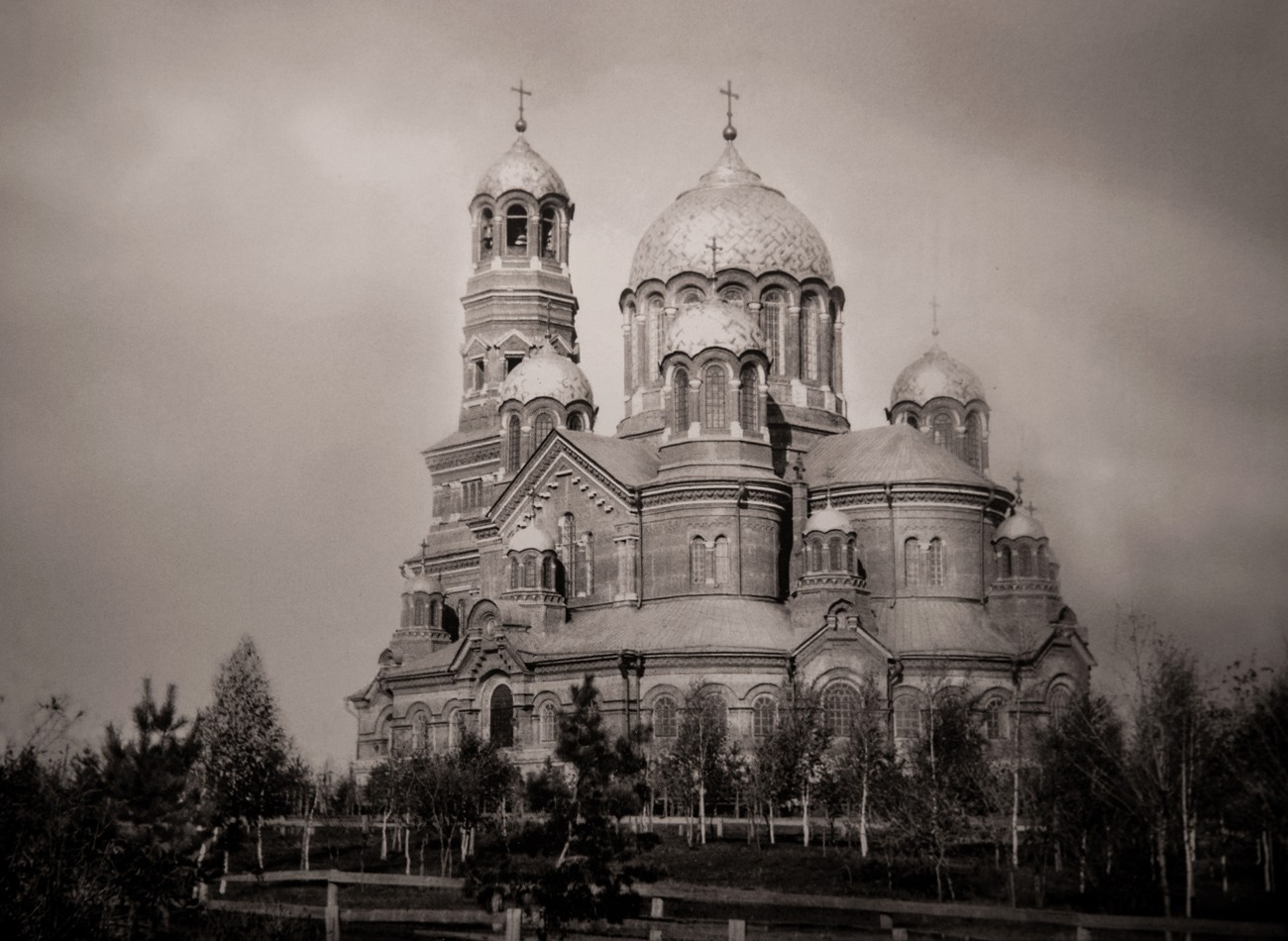
- Cathedral of Christ the Saviour
- 53.1954°N 50.1015°E
- Location: Samara
- Country: Russia
- Denomination: Orthodox Christian church

History
- Status: Cathedral

Architecture
- Functional status: Demolished
- Architect: Ernest Gibert
- Architectural type: Church
- Style: Neo-Byzantine architecture in the Russian Empire
- Years built: 1869-1894
- Demolished: 1932

Specifications
- Materials: Brick

Administration
- Diocese: Diocese of Samara

The Cathedral of Christ the Saviour was the main cathedral of the Samara diocese of the Russian Orthodox Church, located in Samara. Built between 1869 and 1894 in the neo-Byzantine style, it could accommodate up to 2,500 people. The design, featuring five domes and a high bell tower, combined Byzantine and Russian architectural elements and, according to some experts, influenced subsequent Orthodox church architecture. Construction was funded primarily by local merchants and residents.

Consecrated in 1894, the cathedral served as the diocesan center and burial site for Samara’s bishops until 1928, when it was transferred to the Renovationist movement and its functions were relocated. In 1930, the cathedral was closed. Plans to convert it into a cultural center were rejected, and it was dismantled—partly using explosives—for building materials. By mid-1932, the cathedral was demolished. A house of culture, now the Samara Opera and Ballet Theatre, was later built on the site.

In the early 21st century, proposals to reconstruct the cathedral were raised by local church and political figures but did not gain support from authorities or architectural experts.

== Background ==
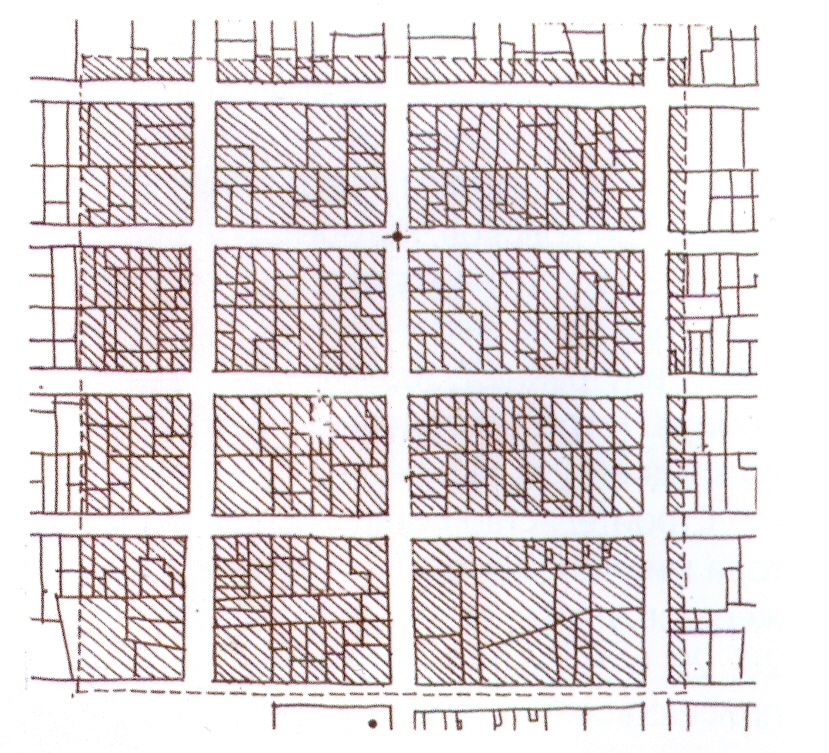
Samara's city plan in 1853.

The Samara diocese was established in 1851, and its first bishop, Eusebius (Orlinsky), initially designated the Church of the Ascension as the cathedral. However, deeming it unsuitable for its new status, he proposed the construction of a new cathedral. The proposal was supported, and by 1853 the approved city plan, signed by Nicholas I, marked the future construction site atop a hill, intended to visually dominate Samara. Although the general plan placed the cathedral at the city's center, slow urban development left the site on the outskirts for decades. In 1887, publicist N. V. Shelgunov remarked that Samara was building its cathedral and theater on the city's edge, apparently anticipating future expansion.

Despite early planning, financial constraints delayed construction. Repeated appeals from local clergy were initially ignored. In 1866, momentum shifted following a petition by Bishop Gerasim (Dobroserdov), coinciding with an attempted assassination of Emperor Alexander II by Dmitry Karakozov on April 4. The event sparked national patriotic fervor. In response, Governor B. P. Obukhov and the Samara City Council adopted a resolution to build a new cathedral in honor of the Emperor’s survival, dedicated to the Savior, with chapels commemorating Alexander Nevsky and other saints.

Imperial approval was granted on April 9, and on April 17, Alexander II’s birthday, Bishop Gerasim consecrated the construction site in a ceremonial procession.

== Preparatory work ==
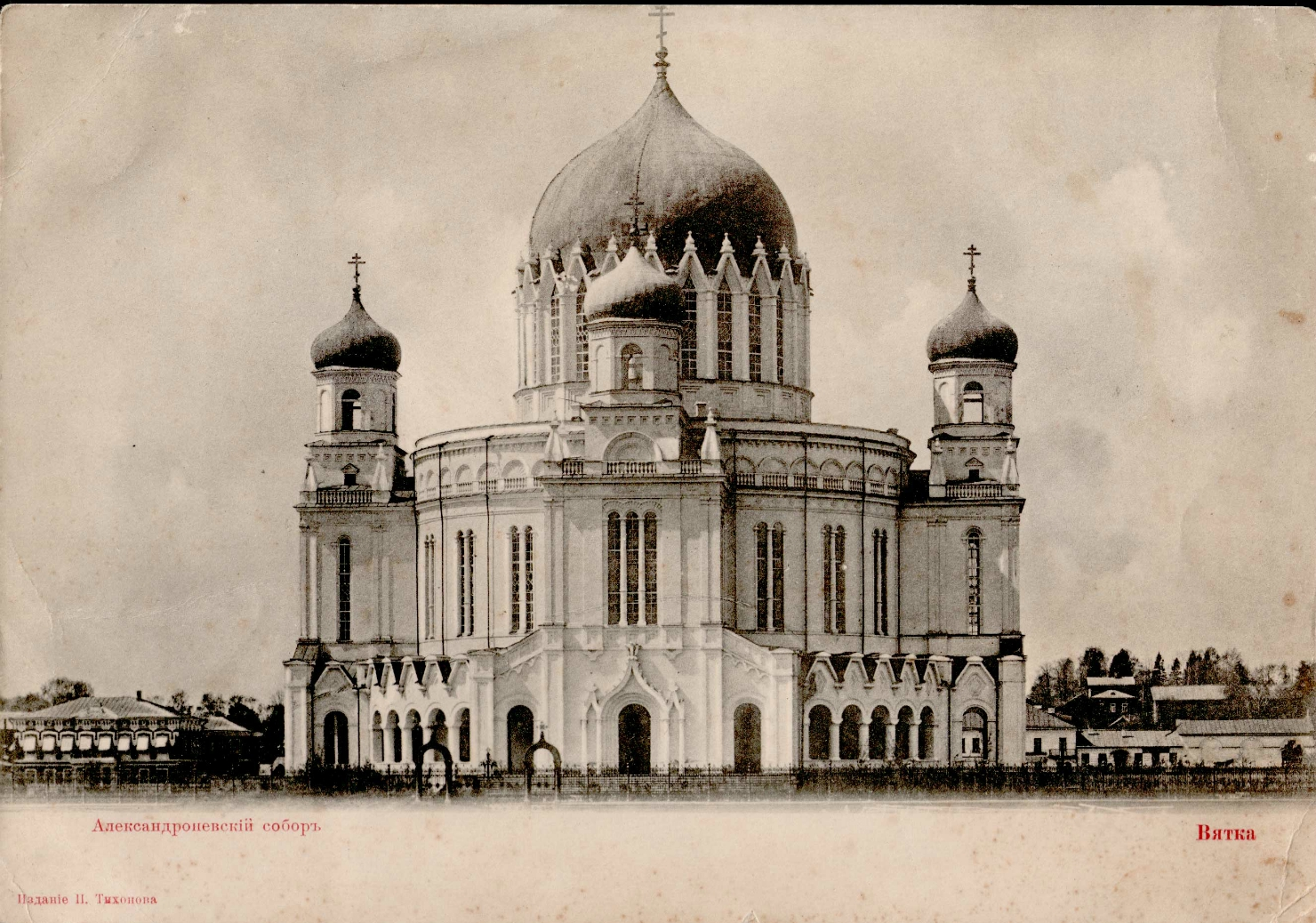
Cathedral in Vyatka.

Following the consecration of the construction site, fundraising for the cathedral began. The Samara city society contributed an initial 15,000 rubles, and a province-wide subscription was launched, raising 39,000 rubles by May 1869.

A special building committee was established to oversee fundraising and construction. It was co-chaired by Bishop Gerasim and Governor B. P. Obukhov and included prominent local figures such as merchants E. N. Shikhobalov, P. M. Zhuravlevlev, I. M. Pleshanov, and others. After the resignation of treasurer I. M. Pleshanov, the role was successively filled by Provincial Marshal of Nobility A. N. Chemodurov and Mayor M. I. Nazarov. With a change in provincial leadership, Governor G. S. Aksakov became co-chairman.

Simultaneously, preparations at the site began. In May 1866, the governor ordered the clearing of land according to the 1853 general plan. The designated area included four residential blocks with 102 homesteads. As per the Ministry of Internal Affairs, 47 owners received new plots elsewhere, 18 were compensated financially, and 37, previously compensated but still residing on-site, were evicted. Some citizens, such as philanthropist I. M. Pleshanov, voluntarily contributed land and purchased additional plots from low-income owners for donation.

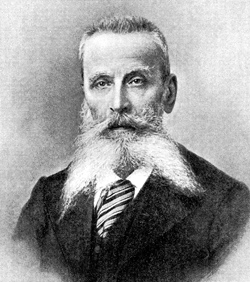
Ernest Gibert

Initially, the cathedral was to replicate the recently completed church in Vyatka. Provincial architect M. D. Muratov was sent to study the structure and acquire its plans. However, the Samara community rejected the design as too small. A revised, larger version also failed to gain approval, including from Emperor Alexander II, who deemed it artistically inadequate. The emperor instructed the Ministry of Internal Affairs to commission a new design, which was developed by St. Petersburg architecture professor E. I. Gibert. His one-story design, accommodating up to 2,500 worshippers, was approved by the emperor on April 11, 1869.

== Construction ==
On May 25, 1869, marking the second anniversary of an assassination attempt on Emperor Alexander II, the foundation of the Cathedral of Christ the Saviour was ceremonially laid following a prayer service at the Iveron Monastery. The event was attended by Governor G. S. Aksakov and Mayor V. E. Bureyev.

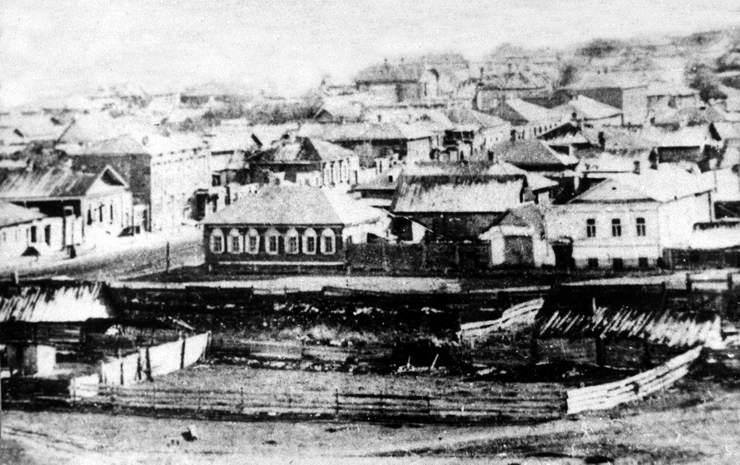
Before the cathedral construction. The southwest part of the future cathedral square, 1860.

A brick factory was established on municipal land to supply materials, and the city provided rubble stone from its quarries free of charge. Excavation for the foundation involved removing approximately 1,900 cubic meters of earth. Initially, provincial architect M. D. Muratov supervised construction, but he was reassigned in 1870, having only completed the foundation.

In 1871, a new city ordinance placed the cathedral's construction under the jurisdiction of the newly formed city duma. On May 18, a special commission was created to oversee the project and raise additional funds. The Duma appointed merchants E. N. Shikhobalov, A. M. Gorbunov, I. M. Pleshanov, P. M. Zhuravlev, and A. N. Shikhobalov as supervisors, though for many years only E. N. Shikhobalov actively managed construction. From 1872 to 1882, he was assisted by merchant F. E. Kolodin, while other committee members primarily focused on fundraising.

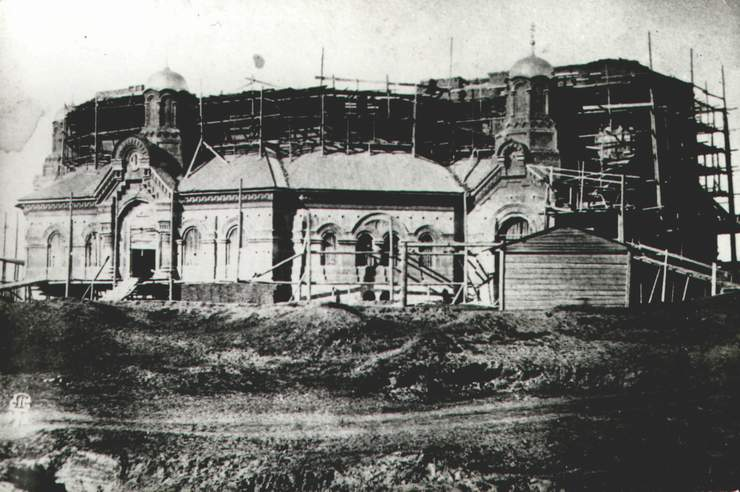
Cathedral construction

After E. N. Shikhobalov’s death in 1888, A. N. Shikhobalov was appointed to continue the work, assisted by G. I. Kurlin. Others, including Zhuravlev, Pleshanov, and Kirilov, declined due to illness. Construction was eventually completed under a committee chaired by Mayor P. V. Alabin, with A. N. Shikhobalov and G. I. Kurlin.

At the time of the transfer of construction oversight to the city, resources included 417 rubles in cash, over 1.2 million bricks, stone materials, three brick sheds, and a completed foundation. Though the foundation was poured as a continuous mass, inverted arches—absent from the original plans—were added during construction to address the sandy soil. These arches later formed a burial vault, allowing for an underground chapel.

The city appointed architect Teplov as the new supervising architect, with a salary increase of 1,000 rubles. He served until May 1873 and was followed by several successors, including N. Y. Marfin, Y. K. Bem, L. A. Reder, Y. V. Krivtsov, and A. I. Fedorov. These architects often juggled multiple responsibilities and were not always diligent in their additional duties.

Construction progressed slowly and was suspended during winter months. However, these pauses allowed the structure to dry and settle properly, strengthening the masonry to a nearly monolithic state.

On August 29, 1871, Emperor Alexander II visited Samara and the cathedral construction site, personally laying a stone in the foundation. Tsesarevich Alexander Alexandrovich and Grand Duke Vladimir Alexandrovich also laid commemorative stones. These three stones were later enclosed in glass and set in a bronze frame, with the tools used during the ceremony preserved nearby in a special ark.

In 1882, the Ministry of Internal Affairs ordered construction to be halted for a structural inspection, emphasizing the need for caution in such a large-scale project. A commission—including representatives of the provincial building department, the mayor, the cathedral’s builders, and the city engineer—concluded that the work had been satisfactory overall, though minor deviations in projections and corners were noted. However, after thirteen years of construction, the absence of a coherent architectural system and detailed plans was criticized. It was recommended that a permanent architect be appointed to prepare comprehensive drawings and conduct stability calculations.

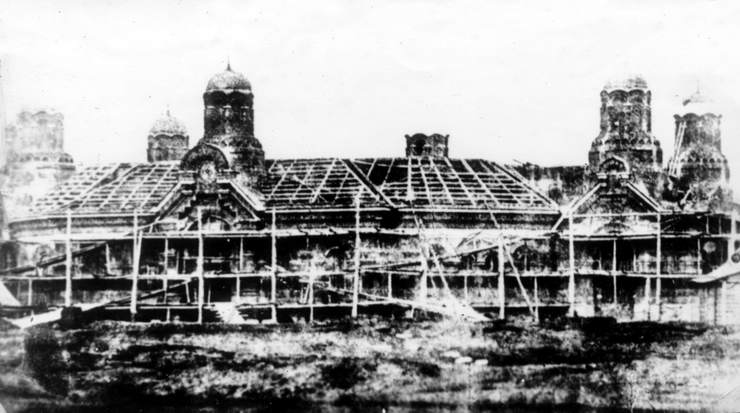
Before the construction of the dome drum

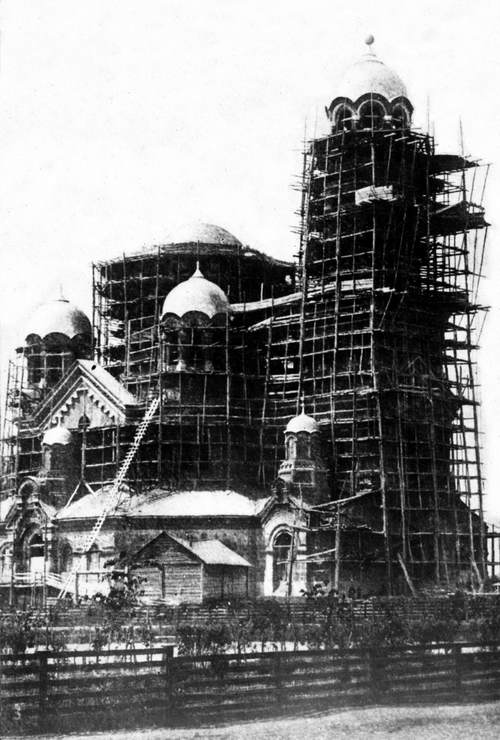
Cathedral construction

Construction was allowed to continue only on sections that did not critically affect the structure’s overall integrity. In 1883, Provincial Architect A. I. Fedorov resigned, and was succeeded in August by City Architect and Civil Engineer K. D. Gordeyev. Gordeyev performed mathematical stability assessments, but the city’s request for a second opinion from Berngard, director of the Institute of Civil Engineers, was declined.

By this stage, construction had progressed to the base of the main dome's tholobate. Vaults previously built were dismantled in 1883–1884. It became clear that the stability of the existing structure—particularly the pylons supporting the main dome—needed to be thoroughly verified before further work could proceed. Progress was further hampered by conflicts between the supervising architects and the builder, Markov, who frequently disregarded instructions and worked independently. The architects had limited success in enforcing adherence to the approved plans.

The city authorities once again turned to Professor E. I. Gibert for an expert assessment, commissioning him at a cost of 3,100 rubles. In May 1885, he presented his findings to the city council. Gibert criticized the absence of architectural oversight: the cathedral had been constructed without soil analysis, structural calculations, or detailed working drawings, relying solely on the approved general design. Despite these shortcomings, he found the construction and foundation to be sound, praising the masonry as precise and masterfully executed. While concerns about structural instability were unfounded, Gibert stressed the necessity of constant architectural supervision. He recommended continuing the work under local architects, with materials and detailed plans to be sent to St. Petersburg for further analysis and calculations.

Construction resumed on May 30, 1885. Architect Stanek prepared and submitted detailed drawings to Gibert, who, in March 1886, sent back mathematical calculations and recommendations. On August 13, 1886, the cathedral’s 35-fathom (approximately 74.5 meters) bell tower was completed. A ceremonial blessing of the bell tower took place on August 30 during Samara’s 300th anniversary celebrations.

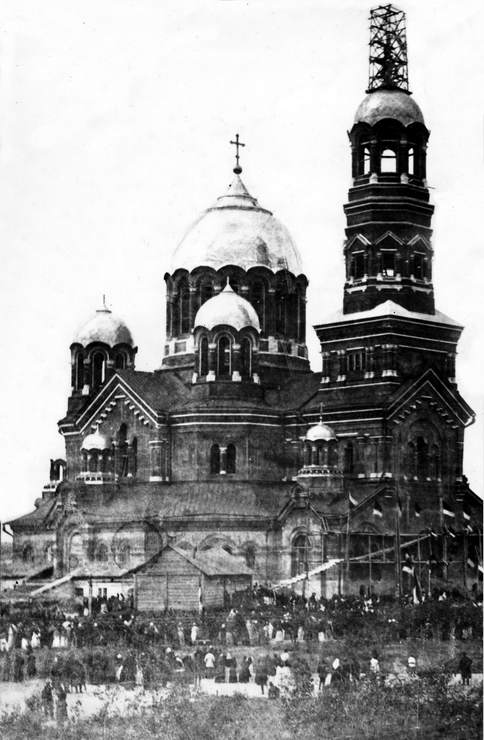
The cross installation

In 1887, following another inspection, work on the main dome began. A machine and master craftsman were brought from Moscow to produce hollow bricks, with 35,000 bricks required for the dome. The dome was completed on August 6, and the cross was consecrated by Bishop Seraphim on October 22. The gilded bronze crosses for both the dome and bell tower were manufactured in Moscow by A.M. Postnikov's firm. The main dome's cross, costing 2,920 rubles, measured 9 arshins in height, 6 in width, and 3 inches in thickness; the bell tower’s cross, slightly thinner, cost 2,800 rubles.

In September 1888, supervision changed again, with technician I. P. Kuroedov temporarily assuming oversight. The city administration focused on planning the cathedral’s interior, including plastering, heating, ventilation, and window installation in the dome. At the city’s request, Gibert drafted interior design plans, while heating and ventilation systems were designed by Professor Lukashevich’s partnership. Though deemed effective, Lukashevich's plan was costly. The city purchased it for 500 rubles and commissioned merchant Kremnev to implement it for 19,000 rubles. Gibert submitted two interior design proposals with iconostases, complete with estimates, explanatory notes, and visual sketches. One concept followed the Byzantine style, with sacred imagery, icons, inscriptions, and ornaments on golden backgrounds. The second design used lighter tones, aiming to create a fresh, vibrant impression, with walls adorned in reliefs and a maiolica iconostasis. Gibert also prepared two stylistically consistent proposals for the decoration of the lower church. Mayor P. V. Alabin noted the quality of both designs, describing the choice between them as difficult.

On March 28, 1889, the cathedral construction commission selected the Byzantine-style interior design proposed by Professor Gibert and submitted it to the city council for approval. Due to the high cost, it was recommended that the project be implemented in stages as funds allowed. Priority was given to the installation of the main iconostases and depictions of the four Evangelists in the pendentives of the main dome. The commission also proposed modifications: replacing the maiolica iconostasis with a carved, gilded one in the same Byzantine style, using slab stone for the flooring, and finishing the elevated areas before the iconostasis with black and light marble.

City Mayor P. V. Alabin, presenting the commission’s recommendations to the Duma, also reported the appearance of cracks in the two western pylons of the main dome. A telegram was sent to Professor Gibert, who responded that he could not provide guidance without an on-site inspection. Gibert arrived in Samara on April 9, 1889, and, alongside city architect A. Shcherbachev, inspected the damage over two days. He provided detailed instructions for addressing existing cracks and requested precise drawings and photographs to help prevent similar issues in the future.

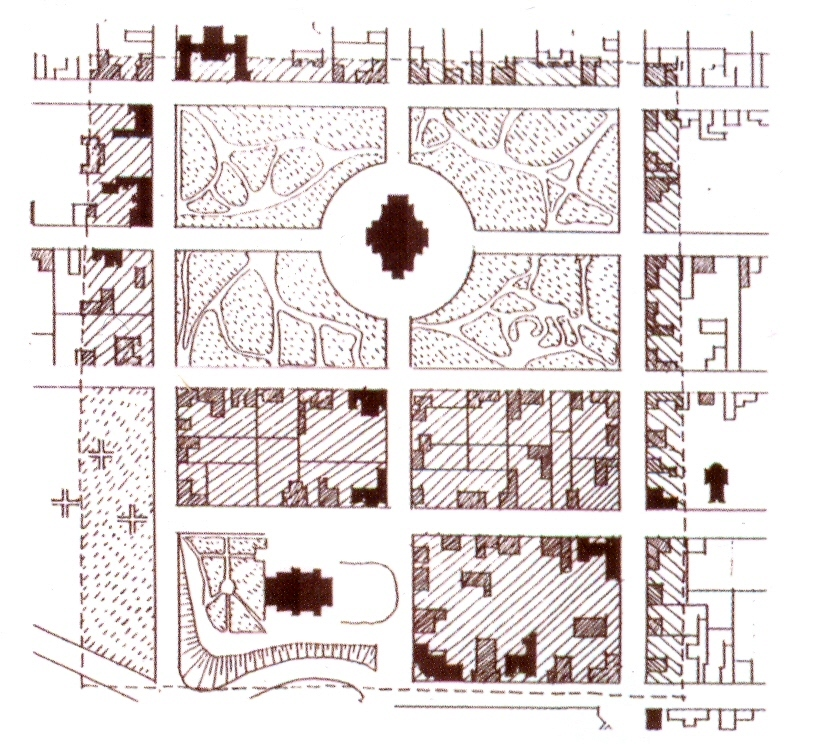
Plan of Samara, 1898.

The city council, dissatisfied with Gibert's conclusions, sought an additional opinion from architect-engineer Kilwein, known for repairing damage at the Nizhny Novgorod cathedral. The council also considered bringing in other experts and decided to suspend all work until the Ministry of Internal Affairs’ construction-technical committee issued a ruling. Relevant documentation and expert reports were submitted to the committee.

Preliminary conclusions were presented by various experts. The provincial construction department stated the cracks posed no serious threat. Kilwein, along with prominent engineers such as V. I. Sherwood, M. N. Chichagov, and B. U. Savrimovich, did not consider the damage significant. On June 26, 1889, Alabin petitioned the governor to request permission from the Ministry to resume construction. Although the Ministry agreed to send a specialist, the inspection was postponed until 1890 at the city council’s request, as no further work or funding was planned for that year.

In spring 1890, the building was re-inspected by the local construction department, which found that the cracks had not worsened. Upon his visit, Privy Councillor K. Y. Maevsky thoroughly examined the iron reinforcements, the internal masonry of the pylons, and 162 monitoring beacons placed on the damage. He concluded that the building was stable and construction could safely proceed, though it should be overseen by an experienced architect. Architect A. A. Shcherbachev was appointed for this role and remained in charge until the cathedral's completion.

== Interior decoration work ==
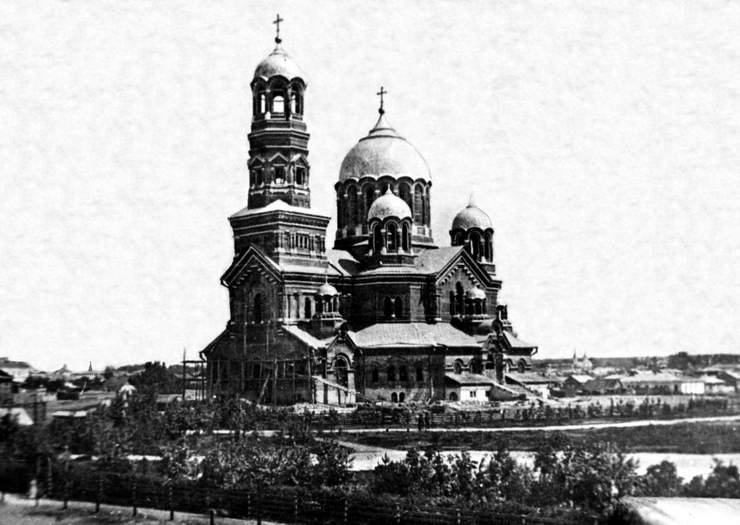
Cathedral

The death of Bishop Seraphim of Samara on January 11, 1891, who was buried in the tomb beneath the unfinished cathedral’s lower church, prompted the acceleration of construction. The city authorities prioritized completing the lower church, which required relatively modest funding. The existing heating and ventilation plans allowed for independent operation in the lower church, enabling the hope that a Requiem Liturgy could be held there on the anniversary of Bishop Seraphim’s death.

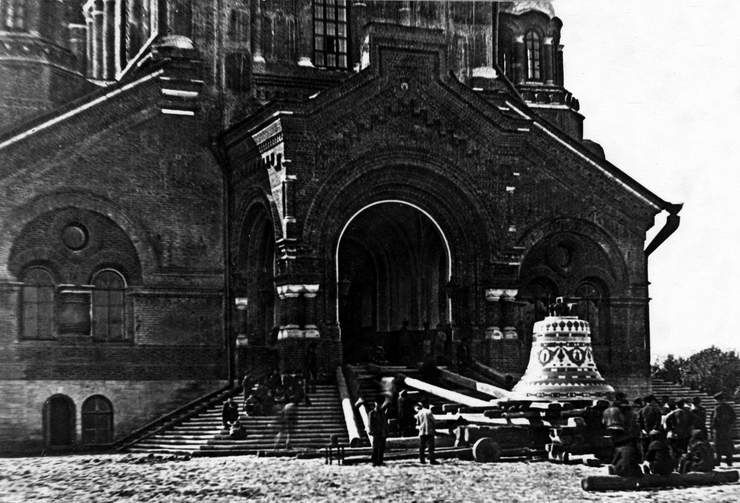
Raising the bell Blagovest on the bell tower

Architect A. A. Shcherbachev designed the lower church’s iconostasis, which was quickly crafted by master Bychkov from light and dark oak, with gilding and carving. The floor was laid with Zhigulyov limestone; the walls were whitewashed and temporarily adorned with more than 200 icons, including 12 large ones, donated or purchased. Eight bells, totaling 250 poods, were installed in the bell tower, made by local manufacturer Buslaev. Liturgical items were acquired through donations and purchases. Icons for the iconostasis were painted on zinc by Sidorsky’s workshop in St. Petersburg. A notable icon of St. Alexis, Metropolitan of Moscow, was painted by Grigory Zhuravlev, an armless and legless peasant artist from Utyovka, who painted using a brush held in his teeth. On January 7, 1892, Bishop Vladimir (Bogoyavlensky) of Samara consecrated the lower church, dedicated to St. Alexis, the patron saint of Samara. A silver-framed icon of the Mother of God Three Joys, bequeathed by Bishop Seraphim, was placed above his tomb.

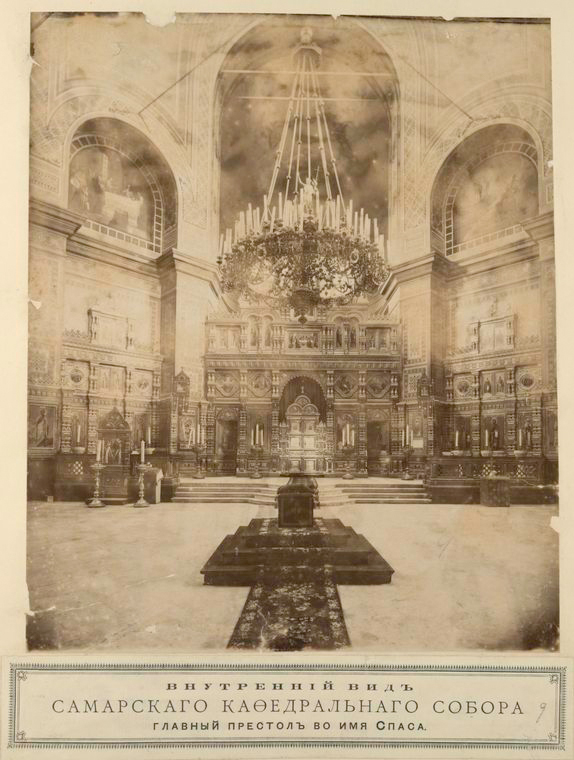
Main altar

However, completing the upper church according to Gibert’s design was financially unfeasible. Estimates ranged from 240,000 to 325,000 rubles. The city, struggling with a cholera epidemic, famine, and economic hardship, could not afford such costs. Mayor N. G. Neklutin, heading the fundraising committee, launched a subscription campaign, raising approximately 100,000 rubles and funding the casting of a large bell, “Blagovest,” weighing 880 poods and costing about 19,000 rubles. Donated by D. V. Kirilov in commemoration of the 1888 rescue of the Imperial family from a train accident, the bell was cast in Moscow and installed in October 1893.

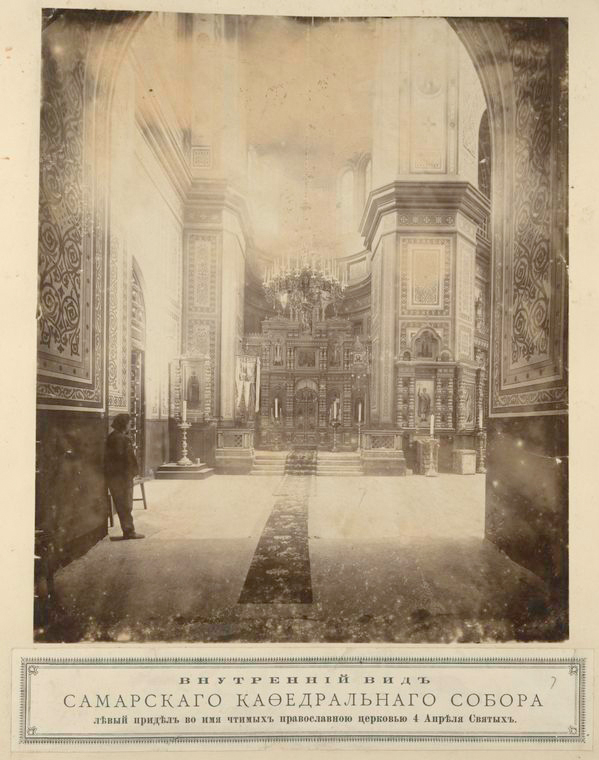
Left side chapel

With the funds collected and Duma support, the upper church’s flooring, vestibules, and staircases were constructed using Zhigulyov stone slabs. Master Belousov of Palekh was commissioned to decorate the interior with biblical scenes and icons in the Byzantine style. He also painted 102 icons for the iconostasis: wooden icons on a gilded, enamel-bordered background, and, for the high places, zinc icons following Scherbachev’s detailed drawings in Gibert’s style. Master Bychkov, also working from Scherbachev’s designs, created three carved and gilded lime-wood iconostases, six kliros, ten hanging kiosks, two kiosk iconostases in pylons, three altars with cypress boards, three worship altars, and six analogions. Craftsmen Loskutov and Budylin from Kazan produced five carved and polished oak exterior doors, three pine interior doors, and four smaller carved doors. Church utensils were commissioned in Moscow, including bronze and silver items gilded with enamel, a large gilded bronze panikadilo (chandelier) suspended on eight chains, two smaller panikadils, vestments for three thrones with gilded icons, and a 12-pound Gospel. The choir grating and iron-clad entry doors were also made to Scherbachev’s specifications.

On August 7, 1894, ten additional gilded crosses were installed, complementing the three already in place. After 25 years of construction, the cathedral was completed. On August 30, 1894, Bishop Gury of Samara and Syzran consecrated the main altar in honor of the Resurrection of Christ. The right side-chapel was dedicated to St. Alexander Nevsky, and the left to saints commemorated on April 4—some sources specifically note St. Joseph the Hymnographer among them. The lower church remained dedicated to St. Alexis.

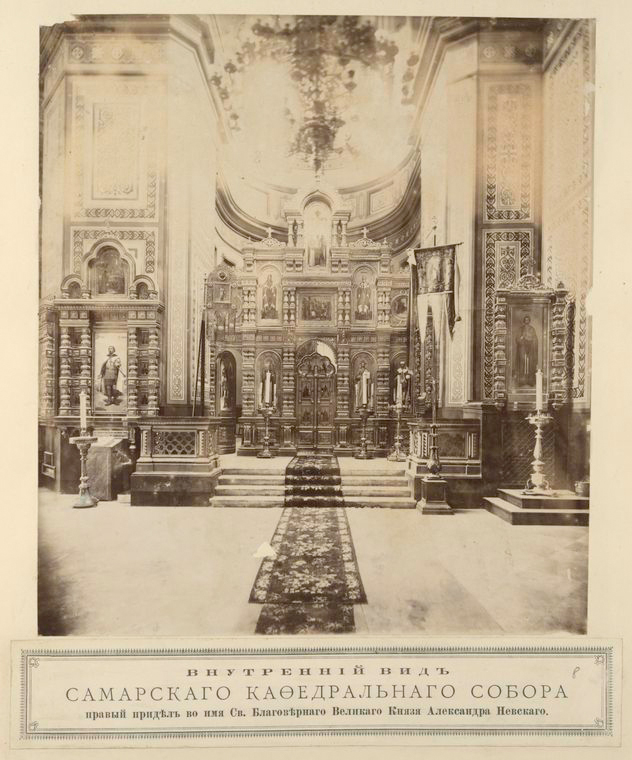
Right side chapel

The cathedral was referred to variously in sources as the Resurrection Cathedral, Christ the Savior Cathedral, or, after the side chapel, Alexander Nevsky Cathedral. It became the most prominent religious building in Samara’s history.

The square in front of the cathedral was named Sobornaya Square (now Kuibyshev Square). A large surrounding garden became a favored gathering place for local residents.

== Financing ==
According to Muratov’s initial estimate, the construction of the cathedral would require 163,244 rubles. The building committee collected 45,624 rubles 75 kopecks during its operation, including 15,000 rubles from the Samara Municipality, and spent 45,187 rubles 75 kopecks. After the project was transferred to the jurisdiction of the Samara City Duma, the Duma assumed the primary financial responsibility. Although construction proceeded slowly, budgetary funding ensured continuous progress.

The total cost of the cathedral amounted to 517,906 rubles 7 kopecks, of which 145,797 rubles 12 kopecks came from voluntary donations. The remaining funds were allocated from the city budget. Some contemporary sources estimated the total cost at approximately 1.5 million rubles, though they did not cite specific sources for this figure.

== Before the October Revolution ==
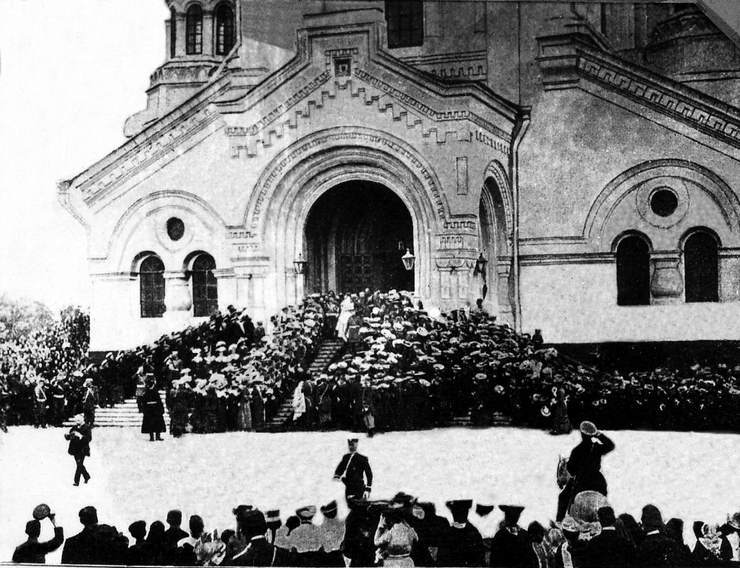
Nicholas II's visit to the cathedral on 1st of July 1904.

In May 1901, the Samara diocese celebrated its 50th anniversary, with Metropolitan Vladimir (Bogoyavlensky) of Moscow and Kolomna visiting for the occasion. On May 14, he celebrated the liturgy in the cathedral, marking a significant event in the region's religious life.

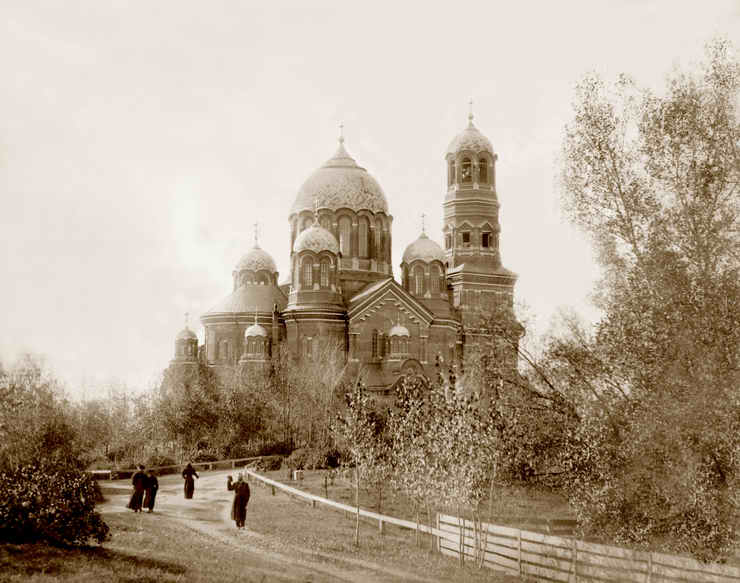
Cathedral, beginning of the 20th century

In the summer of 1904, Emperor Nicholas II visited Samara as part of his tour. After reviewing the local troops, he traveled to the cathedral in an open carriage. The local clergy, led by Archbishop Constantine, warmly greeted him and presented several icons as mementos of his visit. During his visit, the emperor remarked, "Your temple is good. I admired it from the window of the carriage".

In 1910, the 5th Alexandria Hussar Regiment was stationed in Samara. Until the regimental barracks and a dedicated church were built on the city's outskirts, the lower church of the cathedral was temporarily designated as the regimental church. Similarly, the 189th Infantry Izmail Regiment, which had no church of its own, also used the lower church for its religious services.

== Under the Soviet government ==
On January 14, 1918, a memorial service was held in the Cathedral for Constituent Assembly members A. I. Shingarev and F. F. Kokoshkin, who were lynched, as well as for victims of the January Soviet attack on the Alexander Nevsky Lavra. On January 22, 1918, a citywide clergy meeting at the Cathedral decided to hold a three-day fast (January 25-27), with general confession and communion, and organize a nationwide procession on January 28.

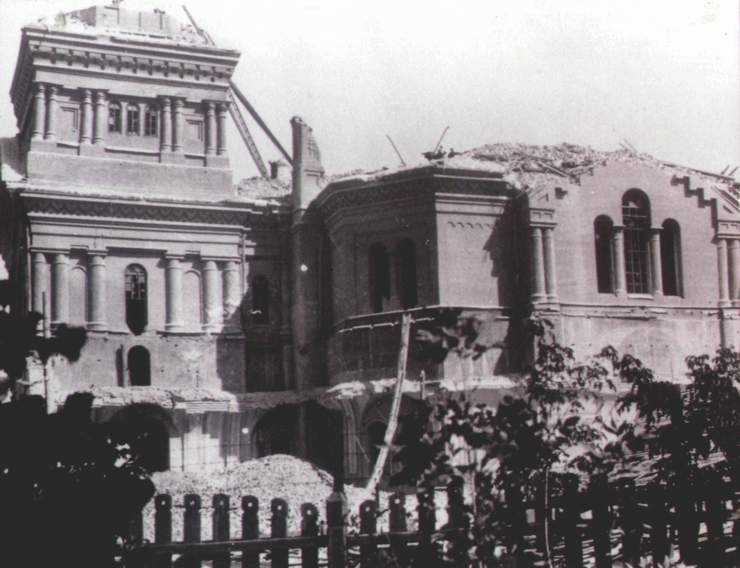
Cathedral's demolition

In the spring of 1918, following the Decree on Separation of Church and State, the building and its contents were transferred to state ownership. A total of 58,273 rubles were withdrawn from the Resurrection and Kazan Cathedrals of Samara. On June 8, 1918, after Samara was occupied by the Czechoslovak Legion, Bishop Michael held a thanksgiving service in the Cathedral, blessing the creation of the People's Army.

In January 1919, the cathedral's records, along with 22,665 rubles in savings, were removed.

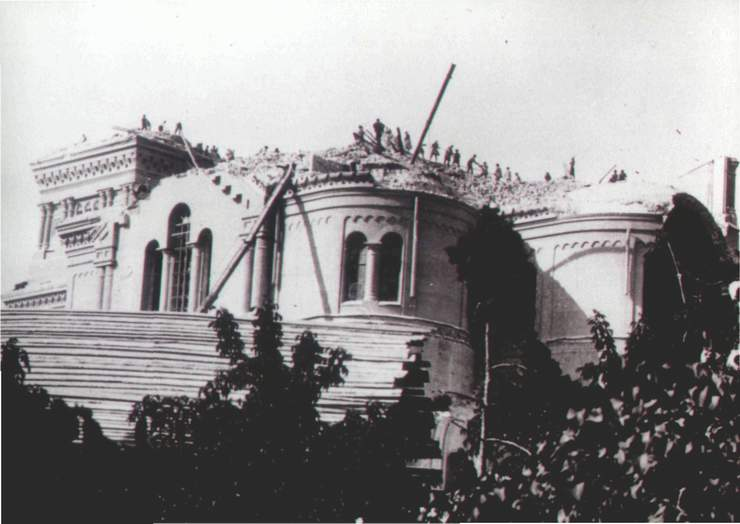
Cathedral's demolition

In 1922, during the seizure of church valuables, the cathedral's property, including silver robes, chalices, crosses, and other liturgical items, was confiscated. Items with historical significance, such as the silver hammer and trowel used by Alexander II and Alexander III, were also seized. The church's rector was asked to replace confiscated liturgical vessels with a riza for the icon of the Mother of God, which was approved. Requests for the return of the crowns and chalice were denied, although the parish was allowed to provide silver in exchange.

On September 1, 1924, the Cathedral Square was renamed the Municipal Square.

During the Renovationist movement, the Cathedral was one of three Samara churches under Renovationist control. By 1928, due to declining attendance and the continued influence of the Renovationists, Bishop Alexander moved his cathedra to the Transfiguration Cathedral, stripping the Church of the Resurrection of its cathedral status.

In late 1929, the process to close the cathedral began. On December 20, a meeting of workers from the Promstroi building yard took place, where 110 people petitioned for the cathedral to be handed over to the building workers' club. A similar meeting was held at the alabaster factory the following day, where workers signed a petition for the cathedral’s transfer, with many signatures written under dictation.

On January 2, 1930, the City Council's Presidium decided to transfer the Cathedral to the Union of Construction Workers to be converted into a House of Culture. The remaining property of the Cathedral was moved to the Pokrovsky Church, which was under the control of the Renovationist "Living Church" movement. On January 7, the regional department of the Union of Construction Workers formed a commission to oversee the redesign of the Cathedral into a club. By January 15, an agreement was signed with architect P. A. Shcherbachev to prepare the reconstruction project.

On January 25, 1930, the Cathedral was officially leased to the Union of Construction Workers and renamed the "Palace of Culture." The lessee was required to reconfigure the building, including the bell tower, church decorations, and furnishings, by October 1, 1930. On February 6, work began, and bells and crosses were removed, left on Pryzbornaya Square, causing embarrassment among Orthodox citizens.

The Bell Tower, being the tallest structure in the area, was proposed by the Samara Utility Trust to be converted into an expansion tank for the city's heating system. However, the Union of Builders objected, citing the cracked structure of the bell tower, which had been damaged by the weight of the bells.

The dispute concluded on March 22, 1930, when a Moscow commission deemed the transformation project inappropriate and suggested using the Cathedral as a warehouse or archive. A final meeting on April 18, 1930, in Samara reaffirmed this decision, with P. A. Shcherbachev’s proposal to convert the Cathedral into a club ultimately rejected.

=== The Cathedral's demolition ===
On May 7, 1930, the City Council passed a resolution to demolish the former cathedral, citing the high costs required to adapt the building for cultural use and the need for a new cultural center. The decision included the demolition of the cathedral and the construction of a new cultural center in its place, with a competition announced for the new project. "Volzhpromstroy" was tasked with demolishing the building and collecting bricks for new construction projects.

The demolition was supervised by M. M. Khatayevich, head of the Central Volga regional party organization. It was estimated that the demolition would cost 200,000 rubles. The process began in June 1930. Before demolition, valuable oak and pine doors were removed, but several were left near the site, becoming damaged by falling debris. This prompted criticism in the Srednevolzhskaya communa newspaper, after which the doors were removed.

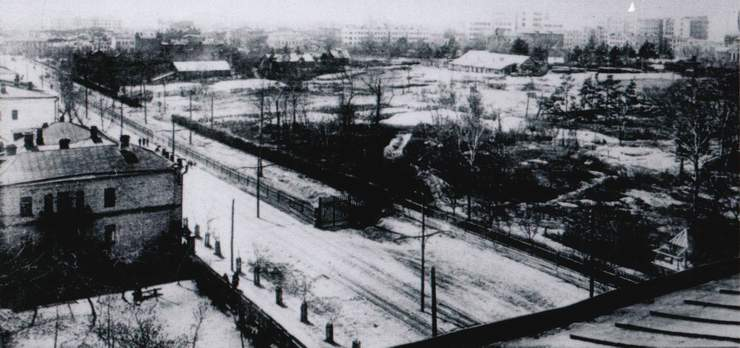
The square after the destruction of the cathedral

The masonry proved difficult to dismantle manually. The bricks were hard to preserve intact, and piles of broken bricks accumulated, which were later used in constructing foundations and stoves. The slow progress of manual dismantling, poor organization, and high worker turnover led to an inefficient operation. The daily output was only 8,000–10,000 bricks.

Faced with slow progress, the decision was made to blow up the cathedral. To protect nearby buildings and ensure more intact bricks, explosions were planned in parts, carried out at night with electric lanterns. However, initial explosions were ineffective.

However, it was not possible to organize effective blasting at once. The letter of the A report from the construction office on August 4, 1930, described the explosions as weak and poorly executed, resulting in only the unnecessary crushing of bricks. Mismanagement, including unprepared workers and absent technicians, contributed to the failure of the explosions. As a result, the demolition was delayed, and the area was filled with rubble, obstructing further work. The removal of debris was hindered by a lack of transport, and the sorting process was poorly organized. Even random organizations were involved in the removal, but the demolition remained “criminally slow,” according to the management.

To expedite the demolition, on April 10, 1931, the "Volzhpromstroy" trust was ordered to establish a factory for producing thermo-concrete bricks from building rubble at the site of the demolished cathedral. The factory was expected to produce up to 32,000 bricks a day, but by September 1931, it averaged 25,000 bricks daily, with production peaking at 46,000 bricks shortly after subsequent explosions. As a result, the pace of demolition increased, and by October, work had begun on demolishing the lower church and the bishop's tomb.

In addition to bricks, materials like basement stone slabs, tile fragments, marble pieces, and scrap iron were salvaged. The stone slabs were used for masonry in lower floors, cold buildings, and basements. Half-bricks were repurposed for foundations in educational complexes and kindergartens. Due to the high quality of the original construction materials, even galvanized iron from the building was preserved, despite the damage caused by falling debris.

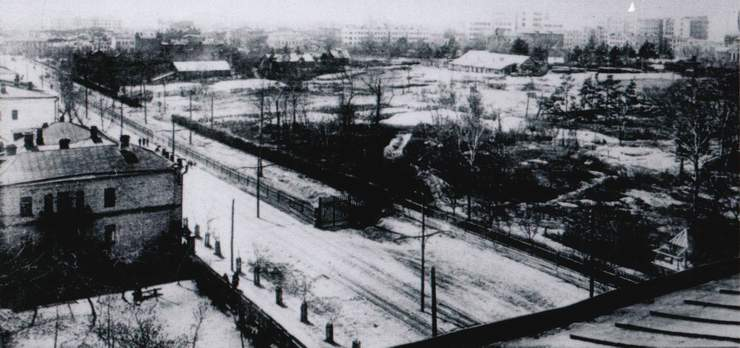
The square after the cathedral's demolition

On April 11, 1931, Gartman, head of the Volzhpromstroy construction office, reported that in the summer of 1930, they had run out of bricks, but salvaged materials from demolished churches and fences had helped meet production goals. This included contributions from the demolition of the women’s and men’s monasteries.

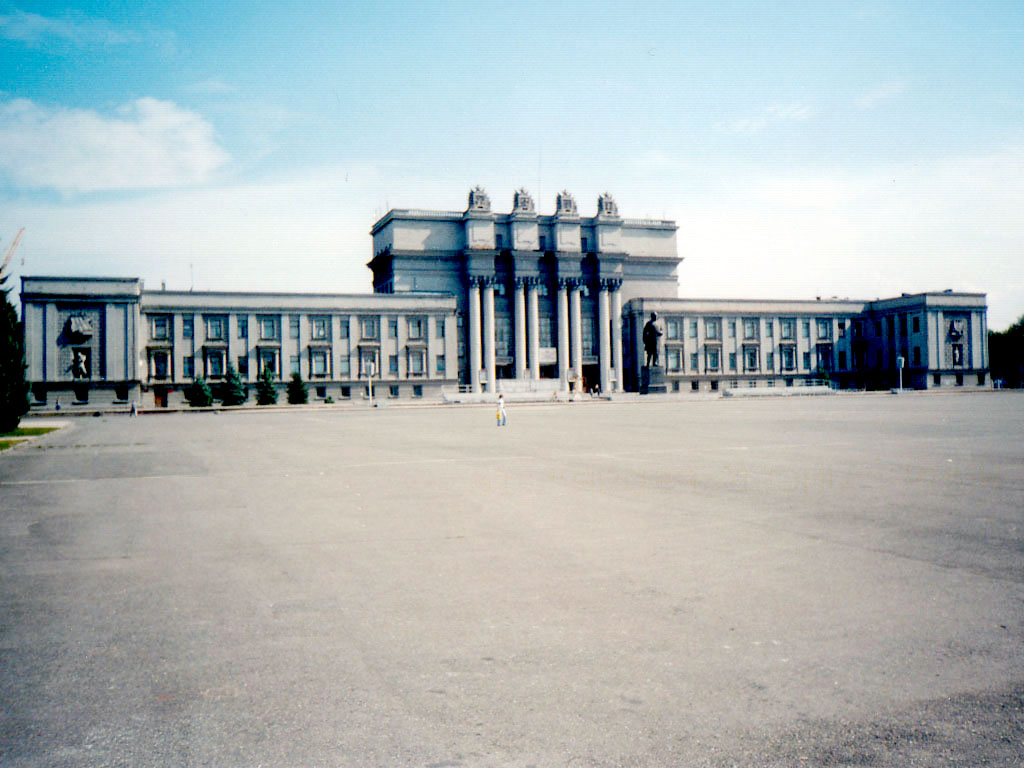
Cultural center

A stone crusher was installed on June 2, 1931, to process large stone remnants into heat-concrete stones. The remaining rubble was transported to the Vilonovsky Descent and used to fill a ravine near Krasnoarmeyskaya Square, as well as for foundation work on the future cultural center.

On March 11, 1932, "Gorstroy" committed to building three public toilets, using the remaining materials from the cathedral’s demolition. By mid-1932, the cathedral was finally reduced to rubble, but as late as 1933, remnants such as thermo-concrete stones, half-bricks, broken tiles, and scrap metal were still stored in Samara’s warehouses. The total cost of demolishing the cathedral far exceeded the initial estimate, reaching more than 260,000 rubles.

=== Kuybyshev Square ===
Before the demolition of the cathedral was fully completed, the Center Volga Regional Executive Committee decided on November 3, 1931, to build a cultural center on its site. Several design proposals were considered, including one by P. A. Shcherbachev, but the project by architects Noi Trotsky and Nikolai Katzenelenbogen was ultimately approved.

On March 17, 1935, the city council decided to redesign the central square and erect a monument to V.V. Kuybyshev, after whom both the square and the city were renamed. The reconstruction of the surrounding blocks took several years and was completed in 1938. On November 5, 1938, a monument to V.V. Kuybyshev, designed by M.G. Manizer, was unveiled on the former site of the cathedral. By the end of December, the entire square complex and the new cultural center, slightly shifted from the original cathedral location, were opened.

== Cathedral's architecture and decoration ==
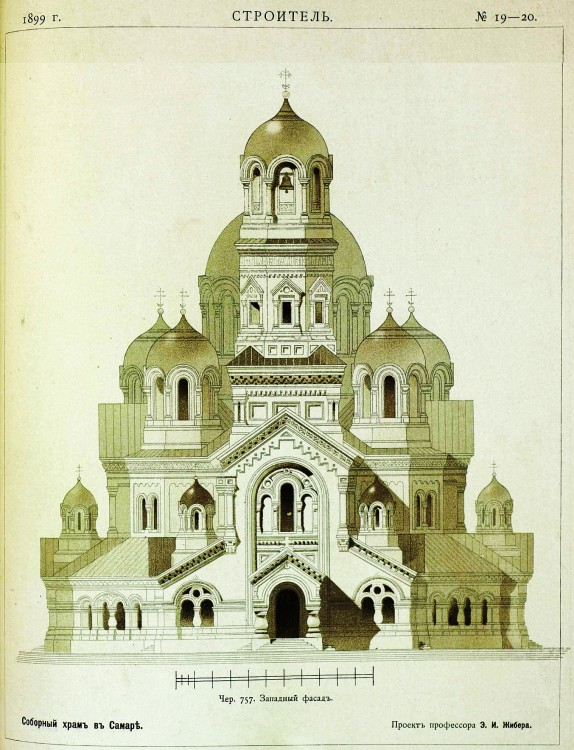
Scheme of the western facade of the cathedral

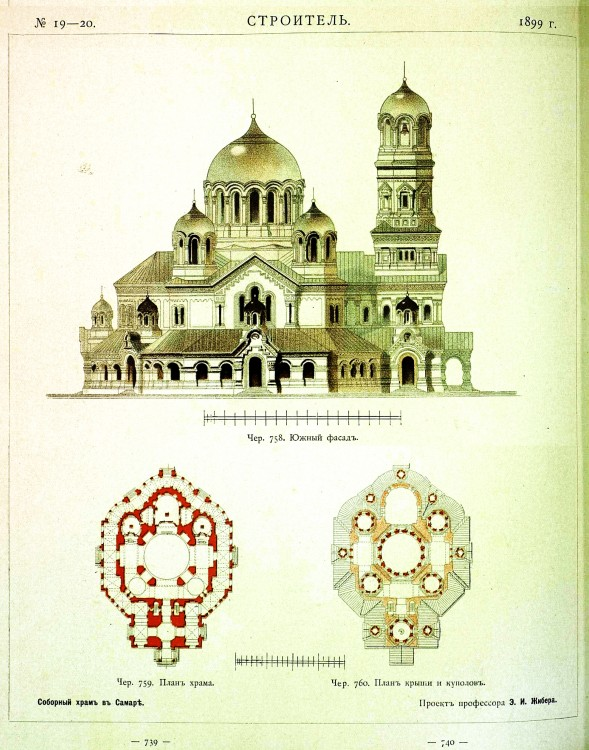
South facade, plan of the temple and plan of the roof and domes

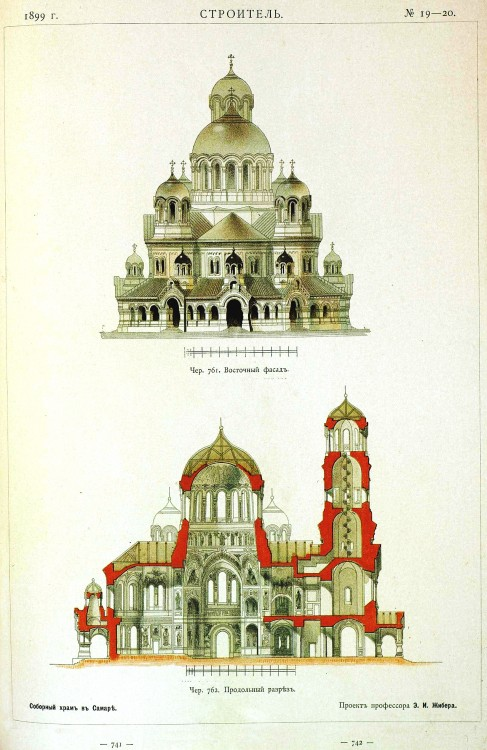
Eastern facade and longitudinal section

=== Exterior ===
The temple, designed to accommodate 2,500 people, was built in the Neo-Byzantine style, marking the first use of this architectural style in the central provinces of the Russian Empire.

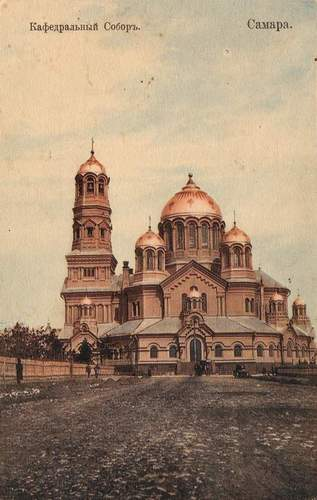
A postcard with a view of the Cathedral of Christ the Savior

There are differing opinions regarding the temple's shape. Some sources describe it as round, with a large central dome and 12 smaller chapels. Others describe it as cubic, with five domes and six small chapels, while some consider it octagonal. The complexity of the structure stems from its combination of a four-pillar temple and an octagonal design, typical of Byzantine architecture. The temple's dome rested on eight columns, formed by the division of four pylon arches. The 79-meter bell tower, which was significantly taller than the temple, was directly adjacent to the main structure. Its design, featuring a hollow dome resting on semicircular arches, became a common feature in later bell towers. Notably, the temple lacked a traditional refectory, contributing to its unified appearance.

The cathedral displayed characteristics of Byzantine, Russian and Romanesque styles. The gables of the facades reflected the Romanesque style, while the high central drum was typical of Byzantine architecture, crowned by a Russian helmet-shaped dome. Smaller drums were placed above the rounded compartments between the arms of the cross. Features such as twin semicircular windows, arcature-columnar belts, and creeping arches belonged to the "Romano-Byzantine" elements of the design. The complexity of volumes, decorative brickwork, and pyramidal forms also echoed the Byzantine style. Russian influences were evident in the pinched columns, couplings, and elements borrowed from folk wooden architecture, especially in the cornices. The high bell tower above the entrance was a typical feature of Russian "ship" temples.

The temple was surrounded by a covered gallery, half the height of the main building. This gallery was one of the first of its kind used in 19th-century temple construction. It was topped with seven small chapels, which enhanced the silhouette of the structure, giving it a stepped appearance.

During construction, the design was slightly modified. In the early 1890s, architect Shcherbachev recalculated the drum of the main dome.

==== Influence ====
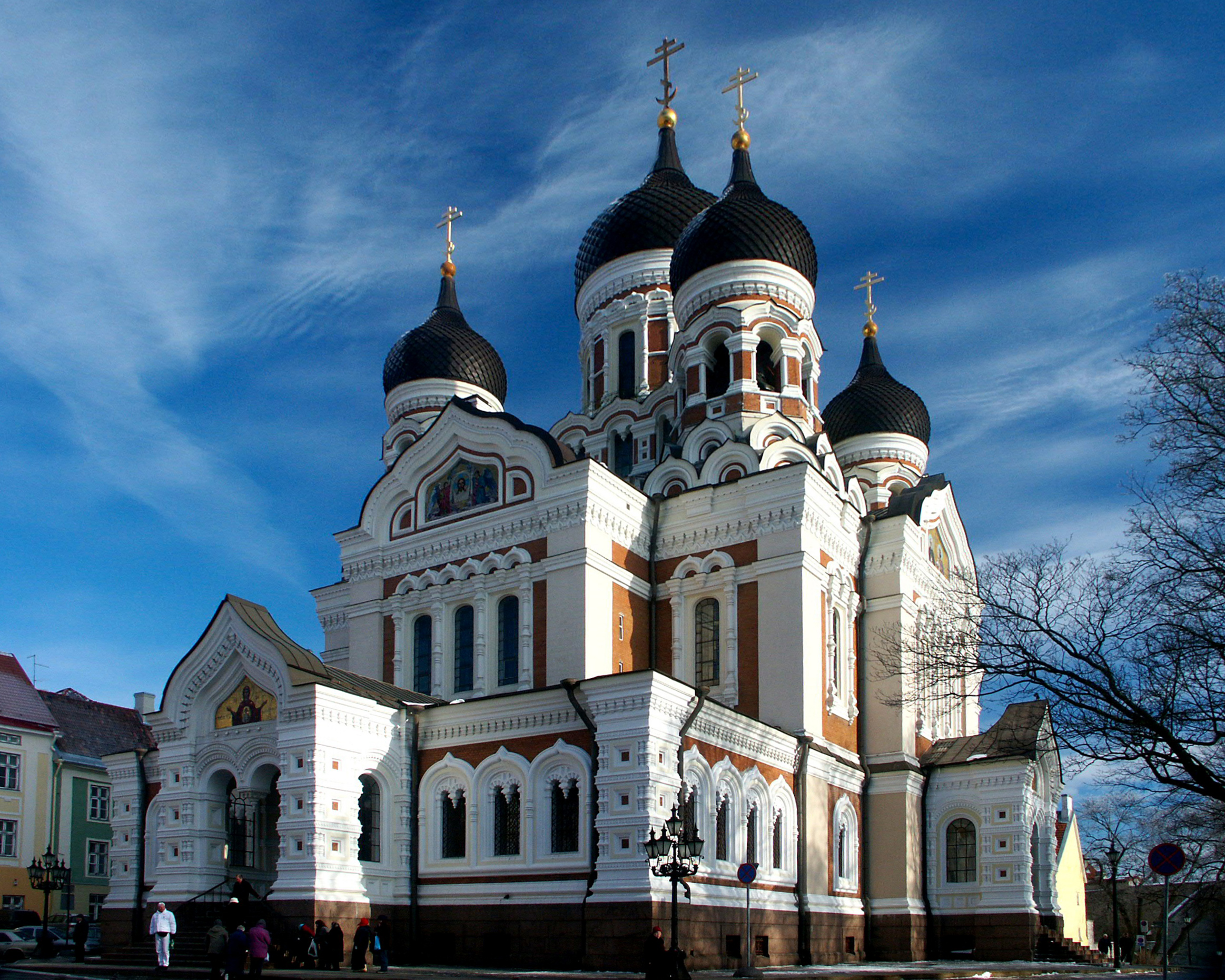
Alexander Nevsky Cathedral in Tallinn

Some authors regard the Cathedral of the Holy Resurrection as the origin of a typological series of five-domed temples with a high bell tower, blending Byzantine and Russian architectural styles. This design is seen as a precursor to several religious buildings, with some considering it a prototype for modern structures as well.

There is also an opinion that churches in Tallinn and Novocherkassk were built using similar designs, though this view is not universally accepted.

==== Opinions ====
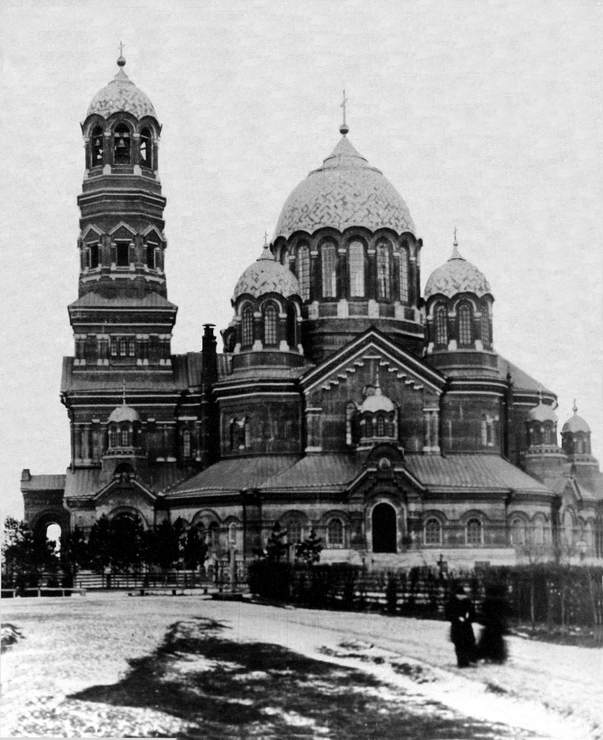
The Cathedral, beginning of the 20th century

There were varying opinions on the appearance of the cathedral and its role in the city's architecture. Soviet historian and architect E. F. Guryanov cited the negative views of writer Count E. A. de Salias, who, in his 1870 travel essay, described the cathedral as "ugly" and compared its domes to mushrooms. He found its design "a faithful example of an era of whip and wine," reflecting an aesthetic that he believed horrified the sense of beauty. Guryanov shared this negative view, contrasting the cathedral's design with the "monumental image of the beginning of socialist culture," referring to the later-built Cultural Center on the same site. However, the travel essay was written at a time when only the foundation of the cathedral had been laid, and the domes appeared more than a decade later, so de Salias’ comments might have been directed at the earlier Ascension Cathedral in Samara.

In contrast, other contemporaries admired the cathedral's grandeur. Geographer A.P. Nechaev, in 1904, called attention to the cathedral's impressive Byzantine style, noting it among the city's most striking buildings. Travel writer E. L. Markov highlighted the picturesque view formed by the cathedral, the Iveron Monastery, the Strukovsky Garden, and the Zhigulevskoye Brewery.

Artist Y. N. Maliev offered a vivid description, noting the twelve domes painted in a July-sky blue, with golden crosses atop the central and four smaller domes. He also described the five high porches leading into the cathedral, accessed by wide stone staircases.

Theologian Veniamin Svechnikov, who studied at the Samara Theological School, praised the cathedral's beauty and its harmonious design, with a slender bell tower that complemented the main structure. He described the cathedral as "massive, majestic, and Byzantine," with its golden crosses shining from afar.

Englishman Donald Wallace, who spent six years in Russia, mentioned the cathedral in his book Russia, noting it as an example of Western European Russian studies. While he didn't comment on the cathedral's artistic design, he questioned the expenditure on such a grand project, given the city's other urban challenges, like impassable streets after rain and blinding dust in dry weather. Nonetheless, he acknowledged the deep religious sentiment in Russia, where people voluntarily contributed to such projects. (Note: Samara is a new town, a child of the last century. At the time of my first visit, now thirty years ago, it recalled by its unfinished appearance the new towns of America. Many of the houses were of wood. The streets were still in such a primitive condition that after rain they were almost impassable from mud, and in dry, gusty weather they generated thick clouds of blinding, suffocating dust. Before I had been many days in the place I witnessed a dust hurricane, during which it was impossible at certain moments to see from my window the houses on the other side of the street. Amidst such primitive surroundings, the colossal new church seemed a little out of keeping, and it occurred to my practical British mind that some of the money expended on its construction might have been more profitably employed. But the Russians have their own ideas of the fitness of things. Religious after their own fashion, they subscribe money liberally for ecclesiastical purposes—especially for the building and decoration of their churches. Besides this, the Government considers that every chief town of a province should possess a cathedral.)

=== Interior ===
The interior of the Cathedral of the Holy Resurrection was described in great detail in the Samara Diocesan Vedomosti, highlighting the craftsmanship and decorative elements that graced the space. The cathedral featured three full iconostases in front of the altars, with wall stands between the iconostases. These were made of carved lime wood, with a pine base and gilded with black gold (96 proof). The quality of the craftsmanship was noted to be fine and intricate, with the iconostases themselves being very graceful. The icons harmonized beautifully with the gilded iconostases, owing to the gold chasing work that adorned them. The thrones and altars were made of oak, with cypress tops, enhancing the sense of elegance in the temple. The mural paintings were described as being done with great care. The placement of the images followed the architect's instructions, ensuring full symmetry within the interior design. The selection and arrangement of the images adhered to historical data and chronological order, lending the murals both a meaningful and deeply informative quality.

==== Lower church ====
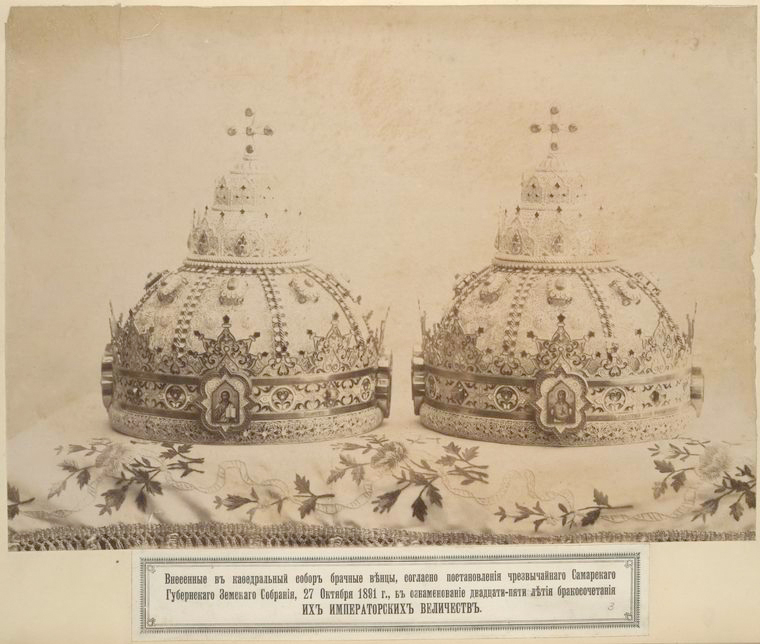
Marriage crowns in honor of the 25th anniversary of the marriage of the imperial couple

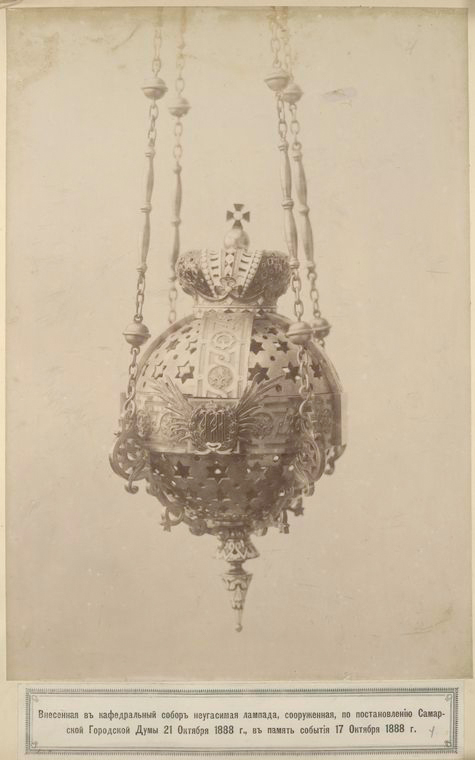
Unquenchable altar lamp in memory of the events of October 17, 1888

Less is known about the interior of the lower church. However, it is noted that the lower church contained a large icon of the Protection of the Holy Mary, which had been presented to the cathedral by the Samara Artists' Union. The iconostasis of the lower church was also designed by the architect A. A. Shcherbachev, maintaining the connection with the overall architectural vision of the cathedr.

==== Higher church ====
The interior of the higher church (upper church) of the Cathedral of the Holy Resurrection in Samara was described in detail in the booklet by P. V. Alabin, titled In the Name of Christ the Savior Cathedral Church in Samara, which was published in 1894 to commemorate the consecration of the cathedral.

One of the most significant and revered icons in the upper church was a copy of the renowned Neff painting The Resurrection of Christ. This icon was painted by the academician A. N. Novoskoltsev at the request of the Samara Provincial Zemstvo in 1890. The Zemstvo had decided to commission this icon to mark the 25th anniversary of the Zemstvo institutions established by Emperor Alexander II. The plaque under the painting read: "The Samara Provincial Zemstvo Assembly, meeting on December 17, 1890, decided: in commemoration of the 25th anniversary of the existence of the zemstvo institutions granted by Emperor Alexander II, to bring into the Samara Cathedral, in the name of the Savior, this forbidden icon of the Resurrection of Christ, as a sign of the resurrection of our fatherland to a new life".

In front of the royal gates, there was a perpetual altar lamp that burned continuously in front of the icon of the Intercession of the Theotokos and the icon of Saints Cosmas and Damian. This lamp, valued at 1,000 rubles, was donated by the Samara City Society in memory of the rescue of the imperial family during the tragic train accident on October 17, 1888.

The cathedral’s interior contained numerous other shrines and monuments, commemorating important events in Russian history and the province of Samara. On the right side, there was an ark containing stones laid by Emperor Alexander II and his sons. This ark, crafted in 1875 by a St. Petersburg craftsman, was designed in the Byzantine style, following plans by architect Count de Rochefort. A gilded plaque next to the ark read: “These stones were laid by hand, the first by the now resting Tsar Liberator, Emperor Alexander II, the second by the now safely reigning Emperor Alexander Alexandrovich, and the third by His Imperial Highness, Grand Duke Vladimir Alexandrovich. These stones are immortal monuments to the unforgettable event of August 29, 1871, for the city of Samara.” The ark also contained the tools used by the royal family to lay the stones: a silver trowel and hammer, a wooden box for lime mortar, and a water washer.

Above the ark were two khorugves (religious banners): one brought by the Iversky Monastery to honor the millennium of St. Methodius's death (celebrated in Samara on April 6, 1885) and the other created by the Samara City Society to commemorate the 900th anniversary of the Christianization of Russia.

The iconostasis and surrounding icon cases contained many gifts and icons donated by the parishioners, including:

- The Icon of the Mother of God Gracious or Worthy: Donated by French citizen Peter Nikolayevich Franchville;
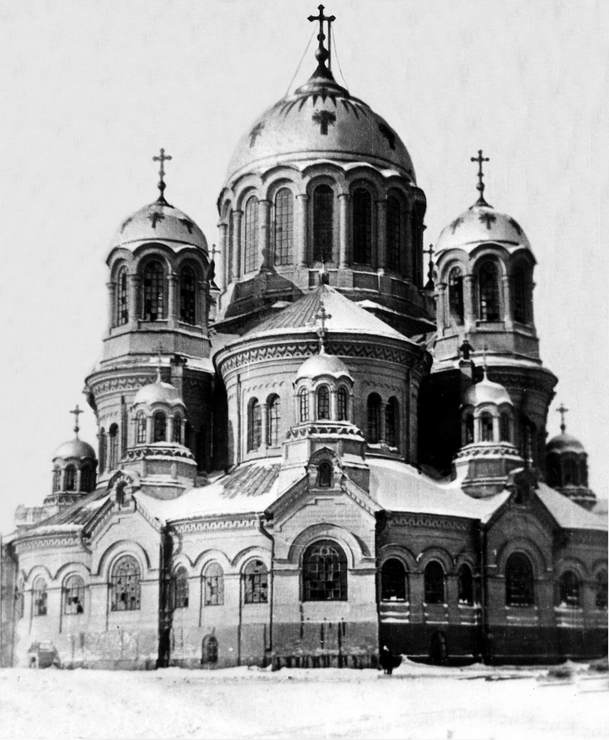
  Cathedral, beginning of the 20th century
- The Icon of the Holy Duke Alexander Nevsky, donated by the clergy of Samara in honor of the 25th anniversary of the reign of Alexander I;
- The Icon of St. Alexis, Metropolitan of Moscow: Sent by Metropolitan Ioannicius of Moscow for the Tercentenary of Samara in 1866;
- The icon of St. John of Rylsk: Sent by the 3rd squad of the Bulgarian Volunteer Corps in gratitude for the Samara flag;
- The icon of St. Vladimir the Apostle: Brought by the Samara City Council for the 900th anniversary of the Christianization of Russia;
- The Icon of St. Vladimir the Apostle Grand Duke: Donated by the Samara clergy;
- The Icon of Blessed Nicholas Kochanov: The patron of Emperor Nicholas I, donated by the city in memory of his death;
- The Icon of St. Emelia: Donated by E. N. Shikhobalov, who had contributed significantly to the construction of the Cathedral;
- The icon of St. Paraskevi: Donated by the City Duma in honor of the 25th anniversary of the marriage of Alexander III and Maria Feodorovna;
- The Icon of Sts. Cyril and Methodius: Donated by the City Council on April 6, 1885, for the thousandth anniversary of St. Methodius' death;
- The icon of St. Mary Magdalene Donated by the Samara Committee of the Red Cross Society in memory of the rescue of the Imperial Family on October 17, 1888.

In addition to these icons, the cathedral received various other gifts, including precious wedding wreaths made of silver and gilded enamel, donated by the Samara Provincial Zemstvo to commemorate the 25th anniversary of the marriage of Alexander III and Maria Feodorovna. A bell, also donated by D. V. Kirilov, was given in memory of the rescue of the imperial family, and a garden surrounding the cathedral, covering 35,000 square sazhens, was laid in honor of the majority of Tsarevich Nicholas Alexandrovich on May 6, 1884.

== Bibliography ==
- Алабин, П. В. (1894). Во имя Христа Спасителя кафедральный, соборный храм в Самаре (in Russian). Самара: Губернская типография. p. 47.
- Белоногов, А. (2011). Главная площадь (in Russian). Самара: Самарские судьбы : журнал. pp. 44–51.
- Берташ, А. (2008). Жибер (in Russian). Vol. V. XIX : «Ефесянам послание — Зверев». Мoscow: Православная энциклопедия. pp. 164–166. ISBN 978-5-89572-034-9.
- Бичуров, Г. В. (2010). Во имя Христа Спасителя кафедральный соборный храм в Самаре (PDF) (in Russian). Самара: ООО «БМВ и К». p. 48.
- Жуков, А. Н.; Мельникова, Н. В. (1994). Культовое зодчество Самары. Самарский краевед: Историко-краеведческий сборник (in Russian). Самара: Самарское книжное издательство. pp. 210–249.
- Зубова, О. В.; Мельникова, Н. В.; Радченко, О. И.; Бочков, В. А.; Подмарицын, А. Г. (2001). Православные святыни Самарского края [Orthodox shrines of the Samara region] (in Russian). Samara. ISBN 5-85234-166-5.
- Yakunin, Vadim N. (2011). История Самарской епархии [History of the Samara Diocese] (in Russian). Tolyatti: Volga Region State University of Service. ISBN 978-5-9581-0235-8.
