= Kuybyshev Square =

Public square in Samara, Russia

Coordinates: 53.1957°N 50.1013°E

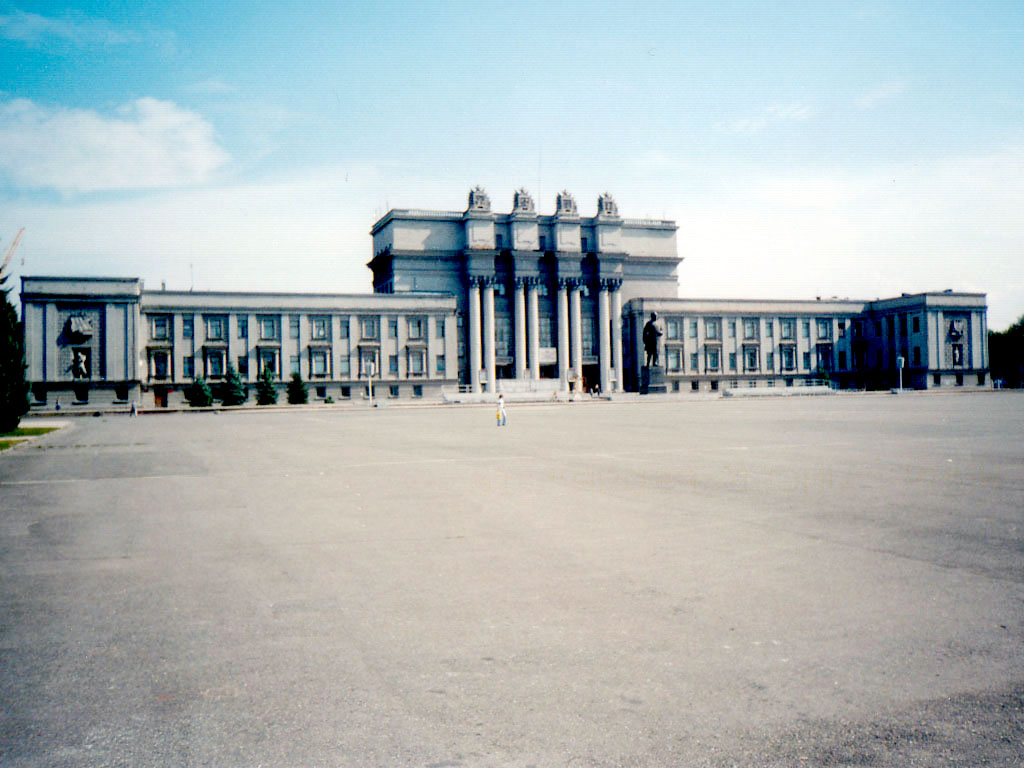
- The Samara State Academic Opera and Ballet Theatre on Kuybyshev Square
- Interactive map of Kuybyshev Square
- Native name: Площадь Куйбышева (Russian)
- Former name(s): Cathedral Square (1894–1924); Communal Square (1924–1935)
- Type: Square
- Area: 15 hectares (150,000 m^{2})
- Location: Samara, Russia

Construction
- Completion: 1894

Kuybyshev Square (Russian: Площадь Куйбышева, Ploshad' Kuybysheva) is a public square in Samara, Russia, located in the city's historic center between Chapaevskaya, Vilonovska, Galaktionovskaya, and Krasnoarmeyskaya streets in Leninsky District. Kuybyshev Square is one of the largest city squares in the world at fifteen hectares (150,000m²), and is the second largest public square in Russia and in Europe. The Samara State Academic Opera and Ballet Theatre and public gardens covering seven hectares are located on the square.

== History ==
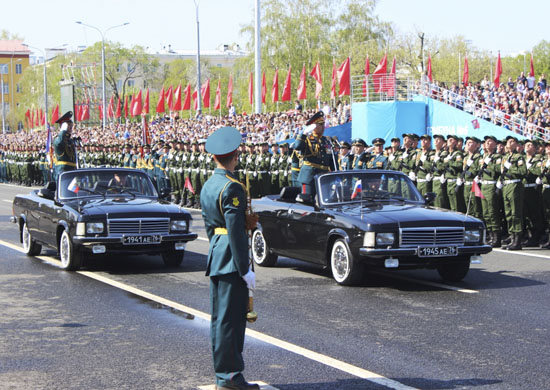
Kuybyshev Square during the Victory Day celebrations in 2018.

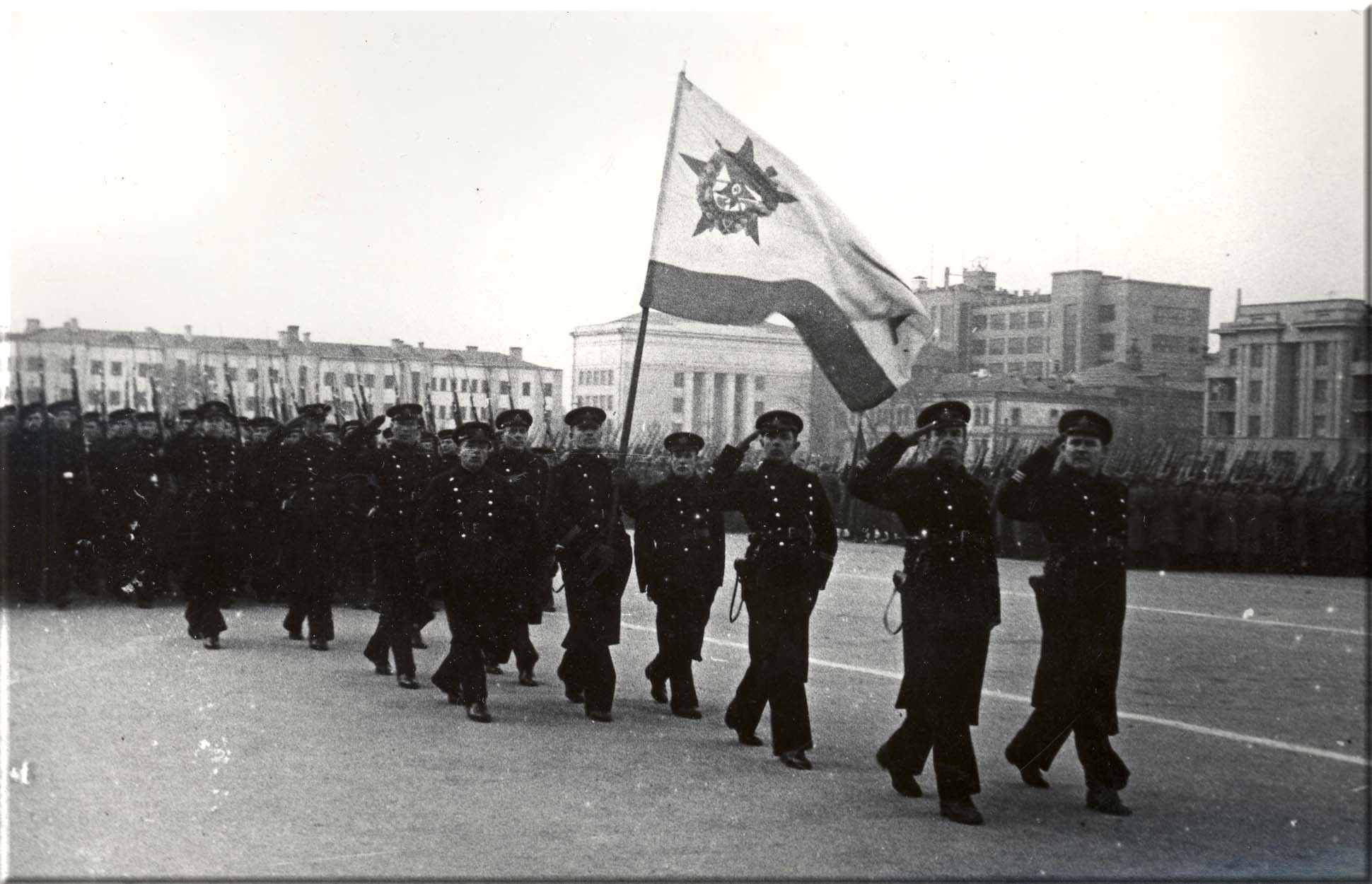
The square during the Revolution Day celebrations in 1941.

Kuybyshev Square was first mentioned in 1853, where it was visible on Samara's general city plan as a huge parcel of land sized at 525 by 325 metres, intended for the future construction of a cathedral and as a prestige piece for the city. On April 17, 1866, the birthday of Emperor Alexander II, the site for the construction of the Samara's main cathedral was consecrated, beginning the square's project designed by architect Ernest Ivanovich Ziber. In May 1869, a cathedral designed by Konstantin Thon in a Neo-Byzantine style with a capacity of 2500 people was laid, but the construction was slow and the square remained largely undeveloped. In 1894, the Cathedral of Christ the Savior was completed, and the remaining land next to the cathedral was turned into a square, initially named Nikolaevskaya Square but was named Cathedral Square (Соборная площадь, Sobornaya ploshad' ) shortly afterwards.

In 1924, Soviet authorities renamed the square to Communal Square ( Коммунальная площадь, Kommunal'naya ploshad' ), and in 1930 the city council approved the demolition of the cathedral, which continued until 1932. On November 3, 1931, the Middle Volga Regional Executive Committee adopted a resolution on the construction of the Palace of Culture designed by Noi Trotsky on the site of the demolished cathedral. In 1935, Samara and the square were renamed Kuybyshev in honor of Bolshevik leader Valerian Kuybyshev after his death that year. A monument to Kuybyshev was erected in the square in 1938, coinciding with the completion of the Palace of Culture in November. In 1941, Kuybyshev Square hosted a military parade in honor of the 24th anniversary of the Bolshevik Revolution because the city was considered a wartime capital for the Bolsheviks. In honor of this parade, annual military parades on the square have taken place since 2011.

During WWII a large bunker complex known as Object No 2 was constructed under the square. This was to serve as Joseph Stalin's command center if he was forced to withdraw from Moscow. Some of the bunkers were reactivated during the Russo-Ukrainian war.

In August 2010, the Toponymic Commission of Samara accepted the recommendation to rename Kuybyshev Square and return to its historical name, Cathedral Square, but Samara mayor Dmitry Azarov did not support the renaming, and the square retained the name.
