= Strukovsky Garden =

Park in Samara, Russia

- Previously known as Strukovsky Garden (in the Russian Empire) and Gorky Central Park of Culture and Leisure (in the USSR)
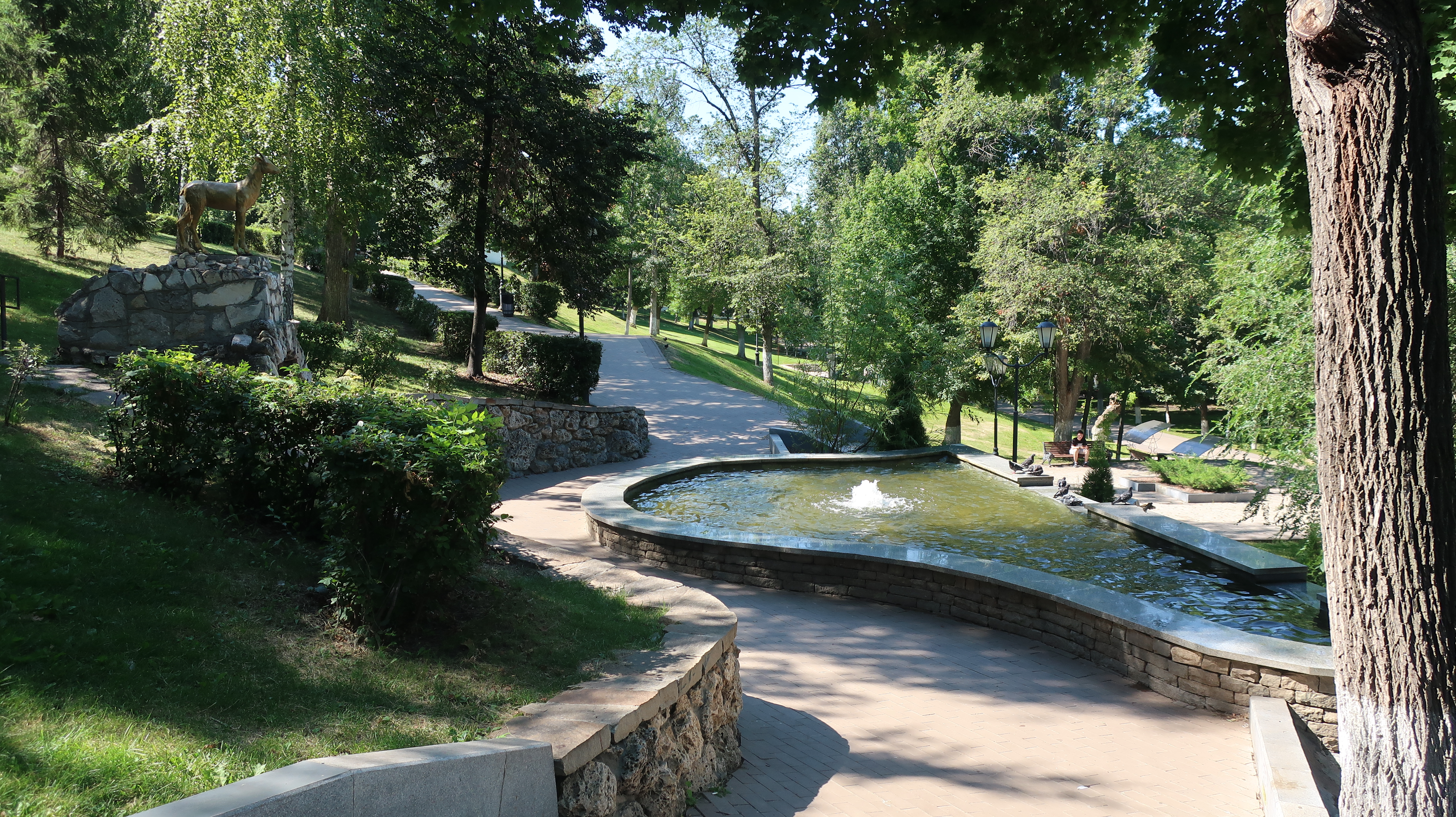
- Upper part of Strukovsky garden
- Interactive map of Strukovsky Garden
- Location: Samara, Russia
- Coordinates: 53°11′50.6″N 50°05′37.6″E
- Opened: 1849
- Area: 11 hectares (27 acres)

Strukovsky Garden (Russian: Струковский сад, romanized: Strukovsky sad) is a central urban park in Samara, Russia, named after Russian colonel and Active State Councillor Grigory Nikanorovich Strukov. It is the oldest park in the city. The park was established in 1849 in the city Centre. It is located in the Leninsky District between Vilonovskaya Street (Strukovsky Garden North), Krasnoarmeyskaya Street (Strukovsky Garden South), Maxima Gorkogo Street (Strukovsky Garden West) and Kuybysheva Street (Strukovsky Garden East).

== History ==
Grigory Strukov owned this territory that was occupied by a forestland in the early 19th century. He planted a garden and built a manor house here. Strukov controlled the Sol-Iletsk salt industry in Orenburg Governorate and headed salt administration in Samara. In 1828 salt industry administration left for Sol-Iletsk. The garden and the manor house were neglected. In 1848 titular counsellor D. E. Obuhov purchased former Strukov's property for 900 rubles. Obuhov gave land to the city immediately. Samara authorities purchased also several nearby plots of land. To begin the provision of urban amenities it was necessary to demolish all houses and household buildings on these nearby plots of land. The rehabilitation was initiated by the governor of Simbirsk (now Ulyanovsk) Governorate P. D. Cherkessky. The opening ceremony took place on 3 June 1849. Pre-ceremony activities included performances with decorative light and fireworks. In 1856 Strukovsky Garden was extended by two neighbouring gardens. First one was belonged to a merchant Pyotr Semyonovich Sinyagin other one belonged to lieutenant Krotkov. The first cinema in Samara was opened in Strukovsky garden in the second half of the 20th century. The first silent films were shown here.

The Samara City Duma elected a special commission of garden enthusiasts, including Pyotr Albin, I. Sanin and E. Annaev. The City Duma had allocated 1800 rubles in maintenance of the garden. To begin the beautification it was necessary to plant more 800 trees and shrubs, demolish old vauxhall pleasure garden, fix benches and replace street lights. A small greenhouse for forcing of flowers and lodge were built on the territory of the park. Appearance of the park was complemented by a delicate wooden railing and stone stairs. The grille was suspended between stone columns. The garden was landscaped and decorated with flower beds.

At the early 20th century the rallies of workers and soldiery took place in a city garden. Vladimir Lenin visited these demonstrations. In 1936 Strukovsky Garden was renamed to Gorky Central Park of Culture and Leisure. Concert platform, children swimming pool Chayka, sculpture of goat and fountain "Boy and girl" were erected in the 1960-80s. Main entrance to the park was decorated with concrete arch at the Soviet period. Monument to Maxim Gorky was opened alongside of the main park entrance.

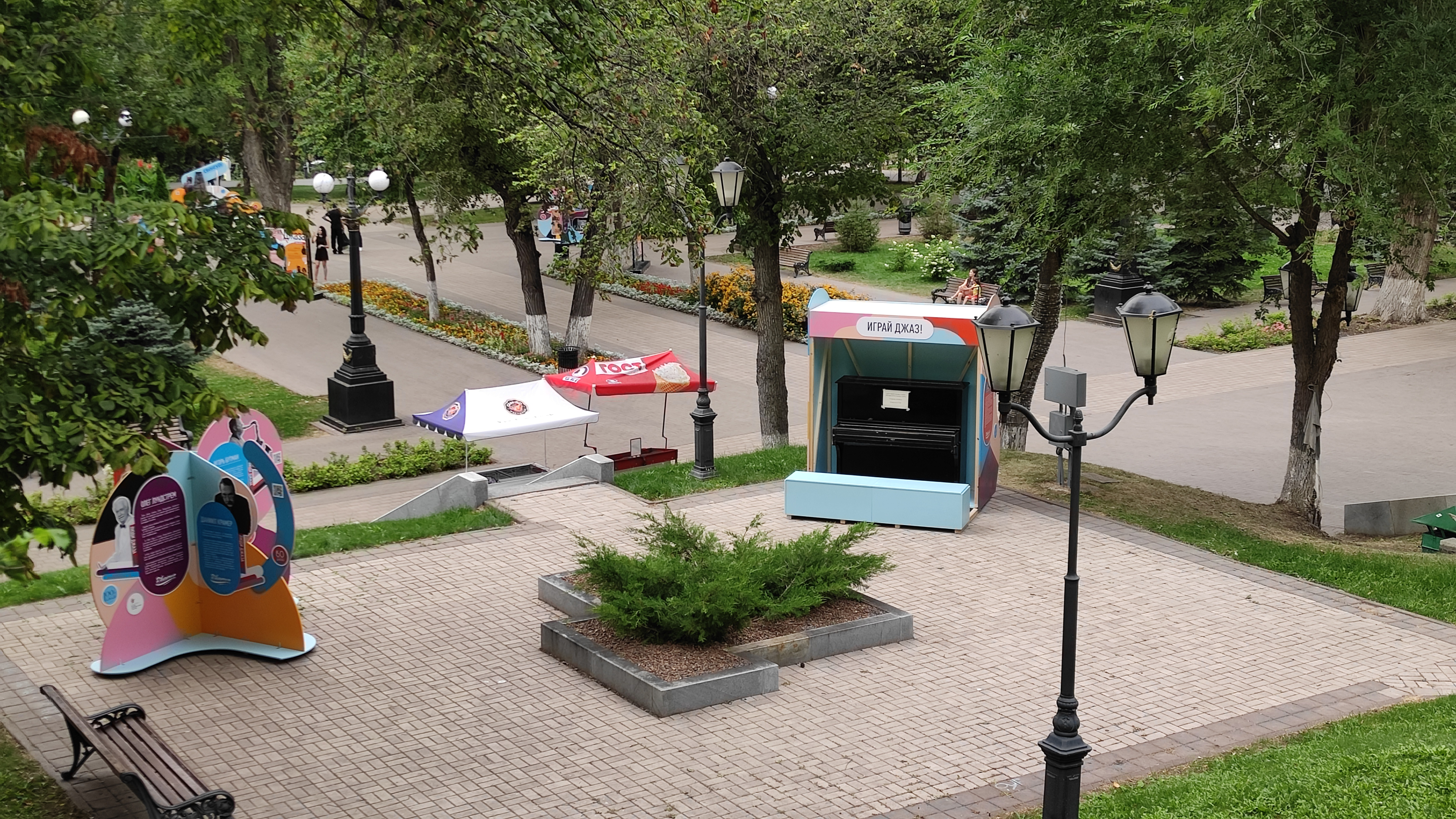
Jazz Fest in Strukovsky Garden (August 2022)

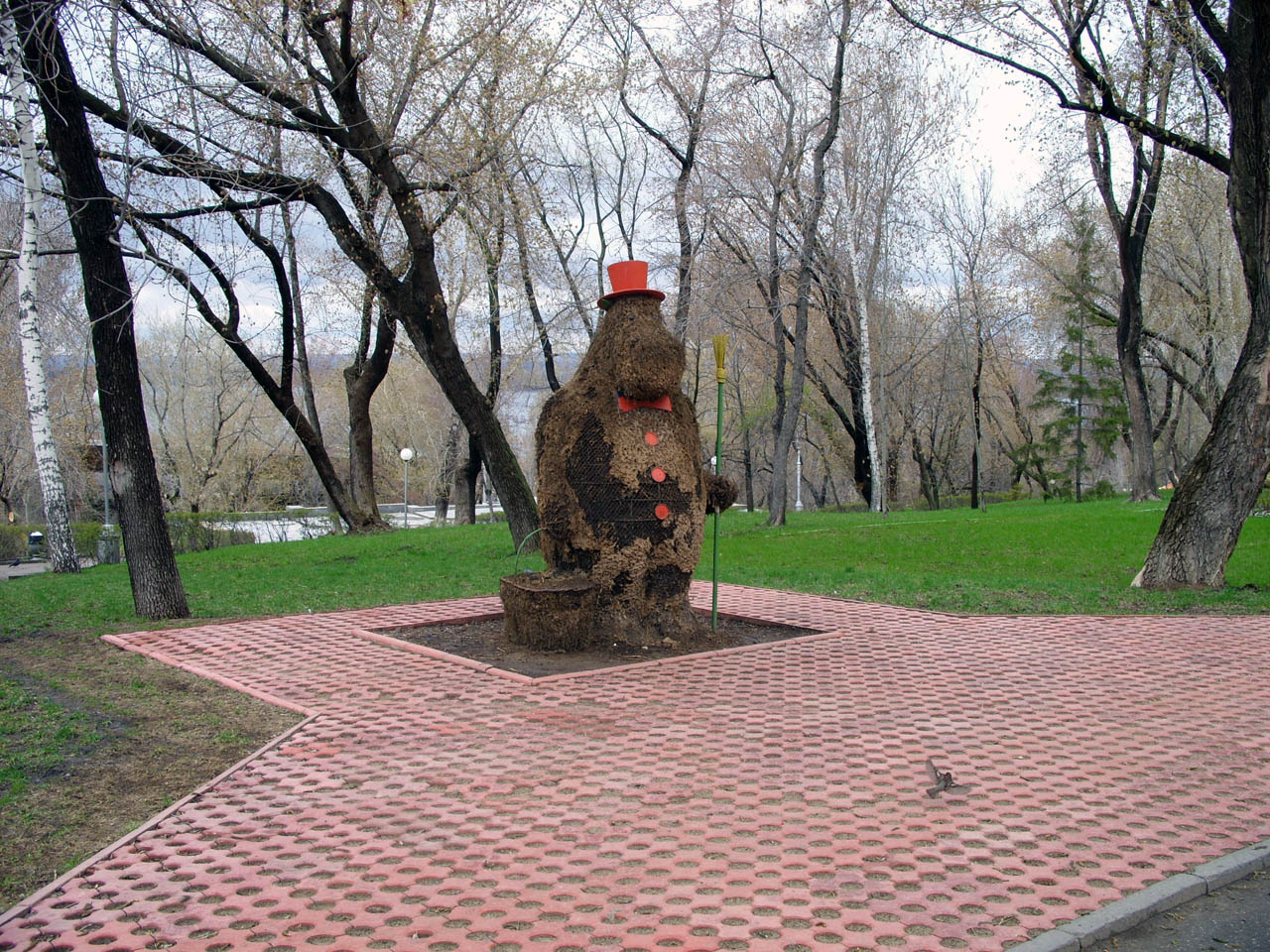
Moomintroll figure

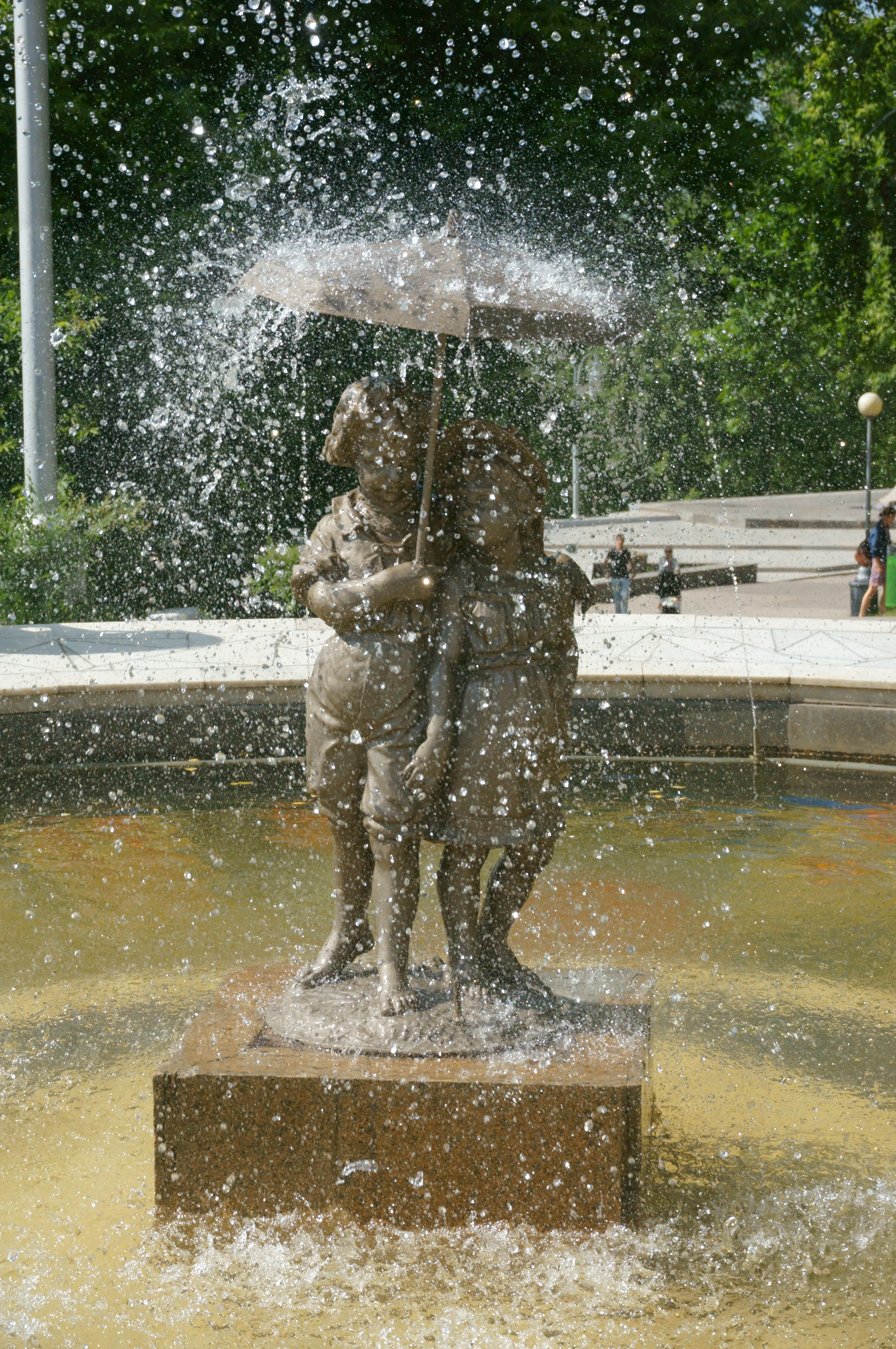
Fountain Boy and girl

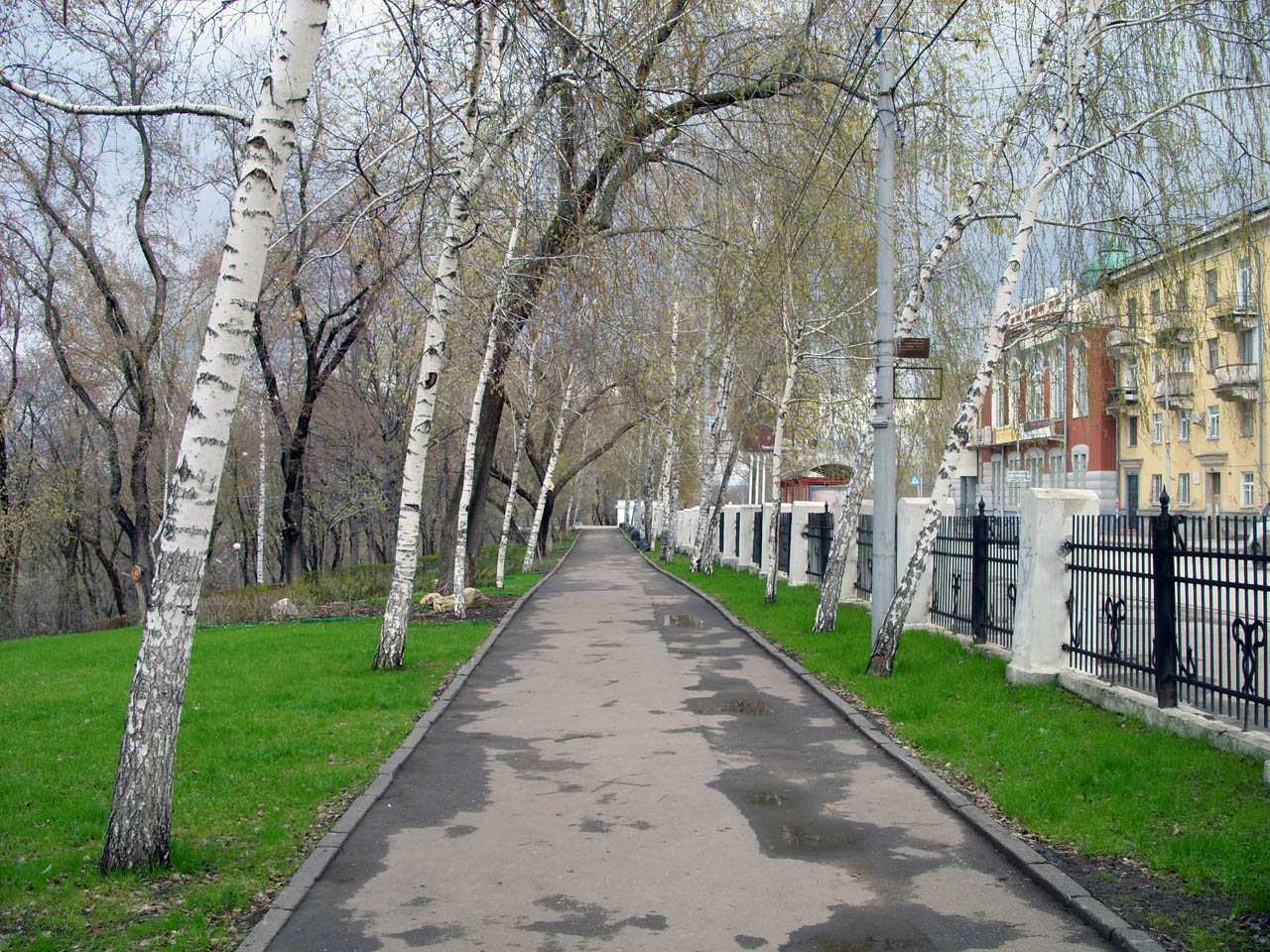
Birch-tree alley
