= Altar lamp =

Permanently lit light by the tabernacle

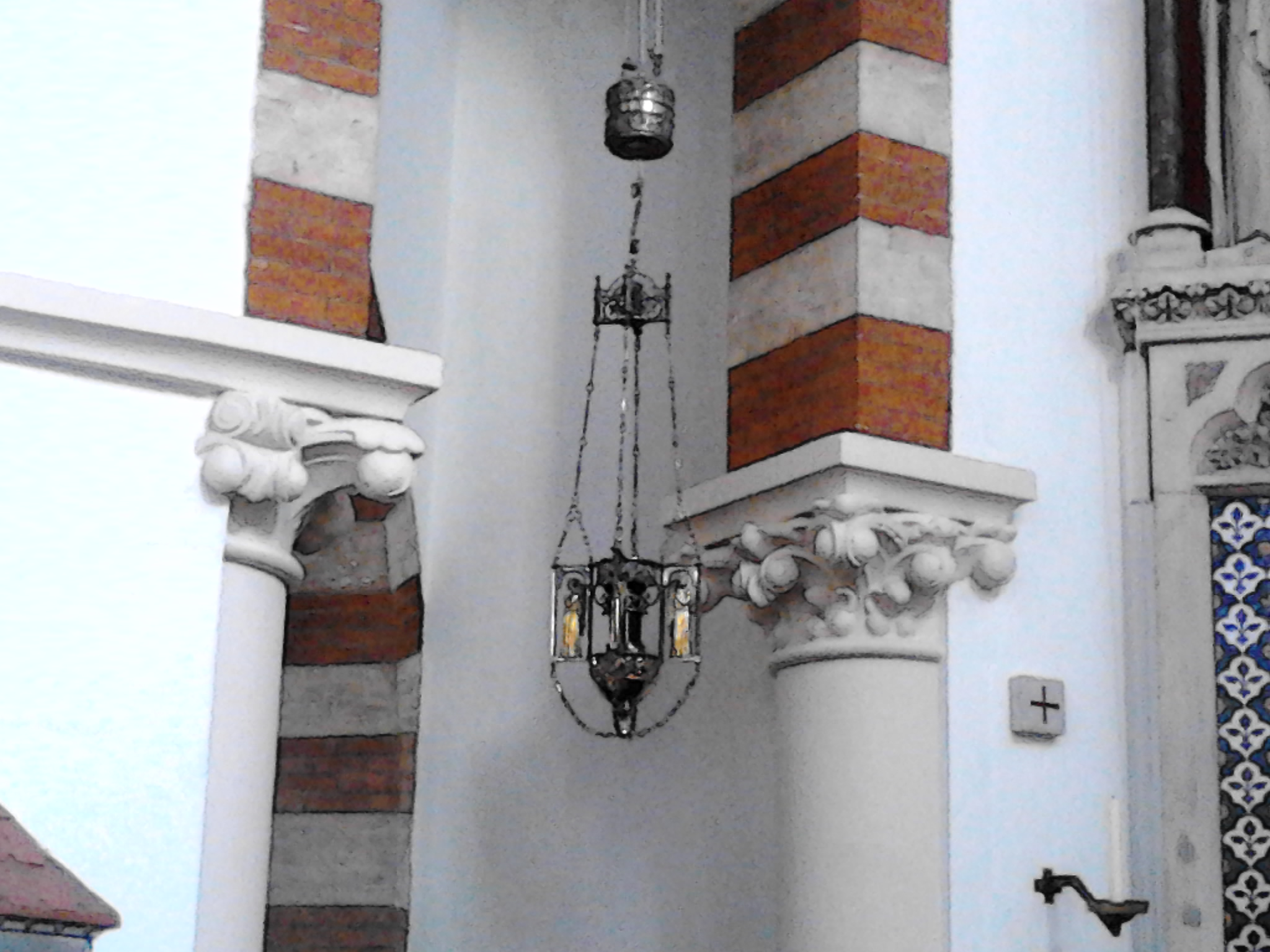
Altar lamp at St Pancras Church, Ipswich, representing a chained rather than a fixed style

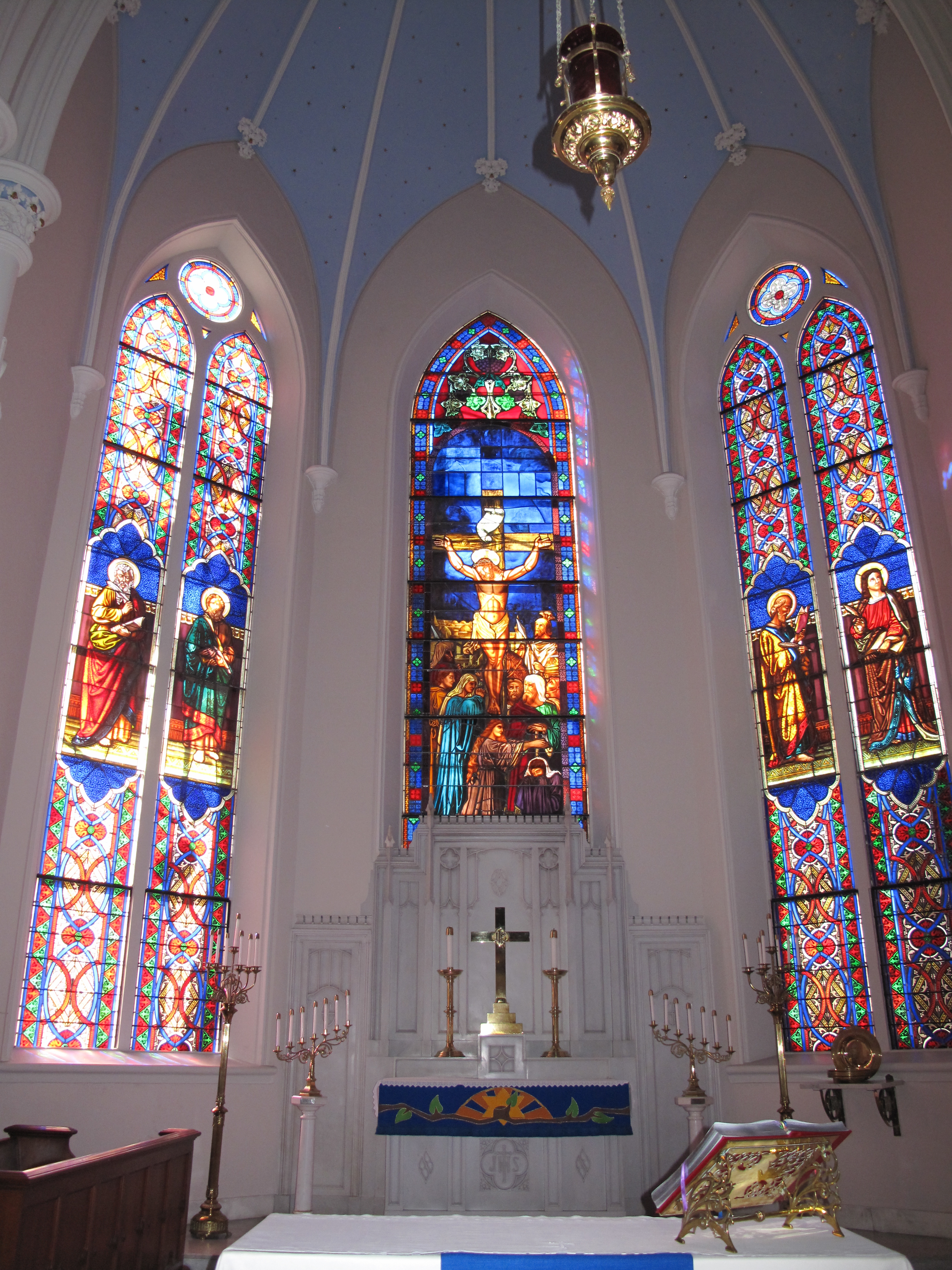
A chancel lamp hangs above the altar of St. Matthew's German Evangelical Lutheran Church

An altar lamp, also known as a chancel lamp, refers to a light which is located in the chancel (sanctuary), of various Christian churches. In Roman Catholic, Old Catholic, Lutheran and Anglican churches, the chancel lamp burns before a tabernacle or ambry, or simply hangs in the chancel, to demonstrate the belief of the Real Presence of Christ in the Blessed Sacrament. The sanctuary lamp may also be seen in Eastern Orthodox Churches. Other Christian denominations burn the lamp to signify the presence of God in the church, and as a symbol of the light of Christ always burning in an otherwise sin-darkened world.

The practice is also influenced by Judaism in the Old Testament; in the book of Exodus, God told Moses that a lamp filled with the pure oil should perpetually burn in the Tabernacle. This is the precedent for the custom in the Catholic Church, as well as certain Lutheran and Anglican denominations, of burning a candle (at all times) before the tabernacle – the house where the Eucharistic Body of Christ is reserved under lock and key. In Jewish practice, this Altar lamp is known for its Hebrew name, Ner Tamid (Hebrew: "eternal flame or eternal light"). Many Christian churches have at least one lamp continually burning, often before an ambry or tabernacle, not only as an ornament of the altar, but for the purpose of worship. The General Instruction of the Roman Missal in the Catholic Church, for instance, states (in 316). "In accordance with traditional custom, near the tabernacle a special lamp, fueled by oil or wax, should be kept alight to indicate and honor the presence of Christ."

Such sanctuary or tabernacle lamps are often coloured red, though this is not prescribed by law. This serves to distinguish this light from other votive lights within the church. In the Catholic Church and the Lutheran Churches, red is widely used. The use of multiple lights, always in odd numbers, i.e., three, five, seven, or more, in place of a single lamp has now become rarer, though it is still seen in some older Catholic churches and in eastern Christian churches. The lamp may be suspended by a rope or chain over the tabernacle or near the entry of the sanctuary, or it may be affixed to a wall. It is also sometimes placed on a ledge beside the tabernacle or on an individual stand placed on the floor. Oil lamps or candles may be used.

== History ==
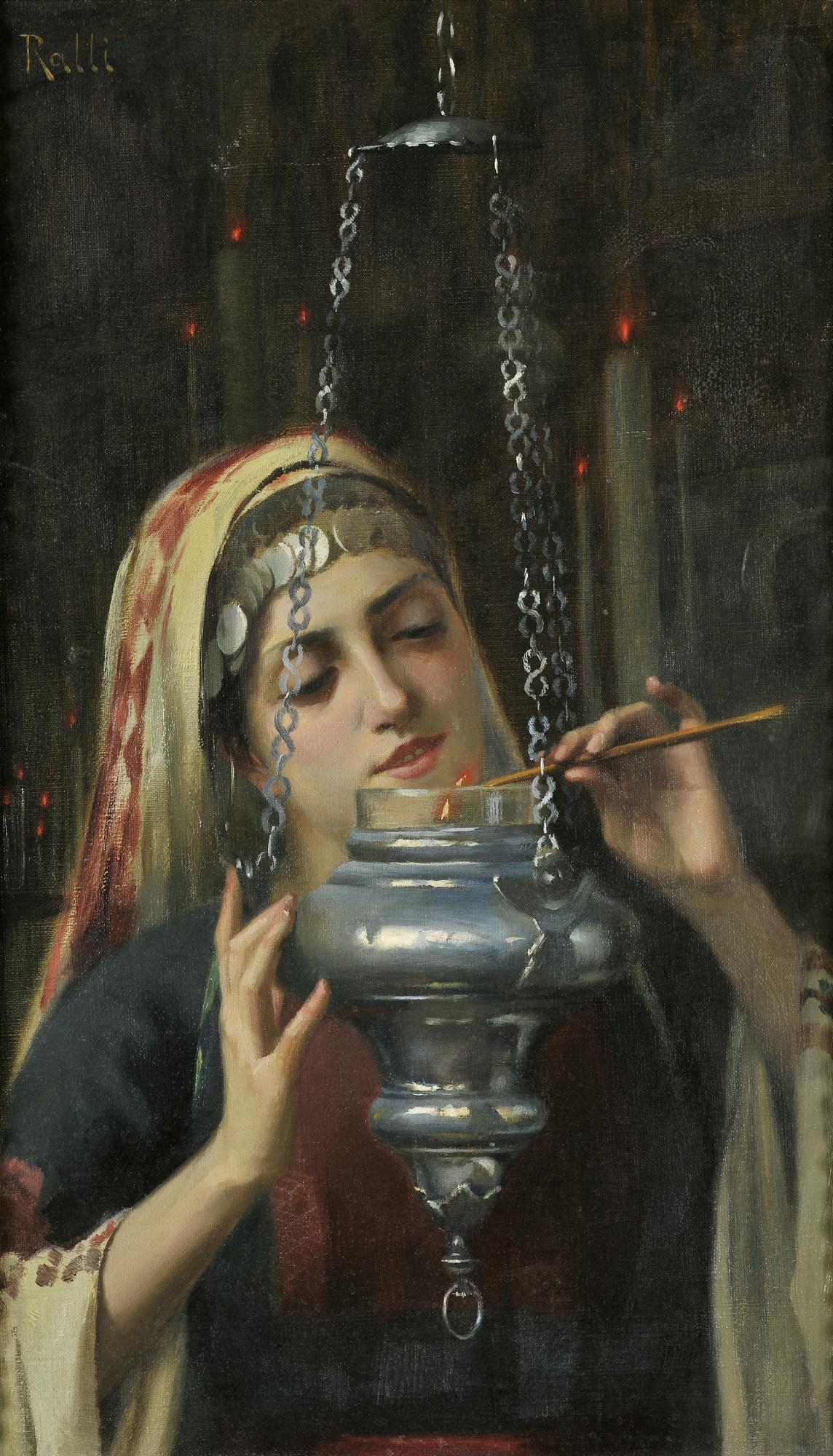
Church Interior by Théodore Jacques Ralli, 1893, woman lighting sanctuary lamp or altar lamp.

In the modern times interest principally centered in the lamp which burned perpetually before the Blessed Sacrament, and it has been the custom with many writers (see e.g. Corblet, "Hist. du sacrement de l'Eucharistie", II, 433 sq., and Thalhofer, "Liturgik", I, 670) to represent this as a tradition of very early date. But the testimonies upon which this opinion is based are, many of them, quite illusive (see "The Month", April, 1907, pp. 380 seq.). St. Paulinus of Nola, indeed, seems to speak of a silver lamp continually burning in the church:

Paulo Crucis ante decus de limine eodem
Continuum scyphus est argenteus aptus ad usum.

There is no indication that this bore any reference to the Blessed Sacrament. It would seem rather to be suggested by the context that it was of the nature of a watch light and a protection against thieves. No really conclusive evidence has yet been produced that the practice of honoring the Blessed Sacrament by burning a light continually before it is older than the latter part of the twelfth century. Still, it was undoubtedly the custom for some hundreds of years before this to burn lights before relics and shrines as a mark of honor the candles burnt by King Alfred the Great before his relics, and used by him to measure the hours, are a famous example—and it may be that this custom generally extended to the place where the Blessed Sacrament was reserved. The constant association of lights with the Holy Grail in the Grail romances is suggestive of this.

The great movement for providing a perpetual lamp before the altar must undoubtedly be traced to the preaching in France and England of a certain Eustace, Abbot of (?)Fleury, about A.D. 1200. "Eustace also laid it down", says Walter of Coventry, speaking of his visit to England, "that in London and in many other places, there should be in every church where it was practicable, a burning lamp or some other perpetual light before the Lord's Body." Shortly after this the practice began to be enjoined by synodal decrees (e.g. at Worcester, in 1240 at Saumur, in 1276, etc.), but as a rule these earlier injunctions recognize that, owing to the cost of oil and wax, such requirements could hardly be complied with in the poorer churches.

It was not until the sixteenth century that the maintenance of a light, wherever the Blessed Sacrament was reserved, was recognized as a matter of strict obligation. At present the official "Rituale Romanum" (Tit. IV, cap. 1) prescribes that "both by day and night two or more lamps or at least one [lampades plures vel saltem una] must burn continually before the Blessed Sacrament", and the responsibility of seeing that this is carried out rests with the priest in charge of the parish. It is further directed that the oil used should be vegetable oil, by preference that of the olive on account of its symbolism.

Exceptionally, in consequence of poverty or some other reason, a mineral oil, like petroleum, may be employed with the bishop's permission. The language of the Caeremoniale Episcoporum (I, xii, 17) might easily suggest that at least in the larger churches more lamps than one should be lit, but always an odd number, that is to say, three at least before the high altar, and five before the altar of the Blessed Sacrament. It seems, however, that this direction of the "Caeremoniale" is to be understood as applying only to greater festivals.

== See also ==
- Sanctuary lamp
