= Ricardo Gómez Roji =

Spanish politician, priest, and scholar (1881–1936)

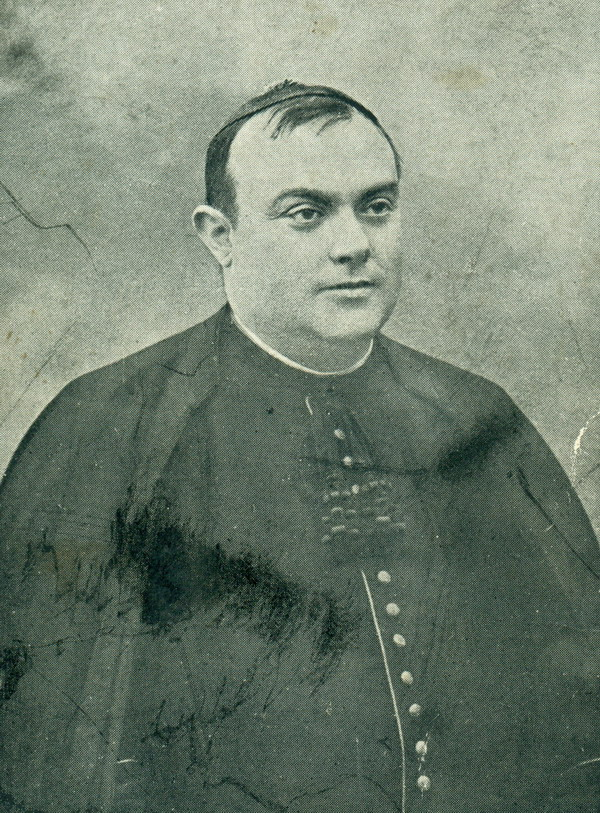
- Born: Ricardo Gómez Roji; 9 June 1881; Pedro Bernardo, Spain
- Died: 15 August 1936 (aged 55); Madrid, Spain
- Cause of death: Execution by firing squad
- Occupations: priest, politician
- Political party: Integrism, Agrarian Party, Carlism

Ricardo Gómez Roji (9 June 1881 – 15 August 1936) was a Spanish Roman Catholic priest, scholar, publisher and politician. For 26 years he served as a lecturing canon by the Burgos Cathedral, known locally for his oratory skills; he also taught theology at the Pontifical University of Salamanca, animated local Catholic agrarian trade unions, and edited and managed few Catholic periodicals and bulletins. His political career climaxed in 1931–1933; elected to the Congress of Deputies as a candidate of a broad local monarchist-Integrist-conservative alliance, he served one term within the Agrarian parliamentary minority. Afterwards he approached Carlism and advanced its cause as a propagandist. Roji was executed by Spanish Republicans during the Spanish Civil War.

== Family and youth ==
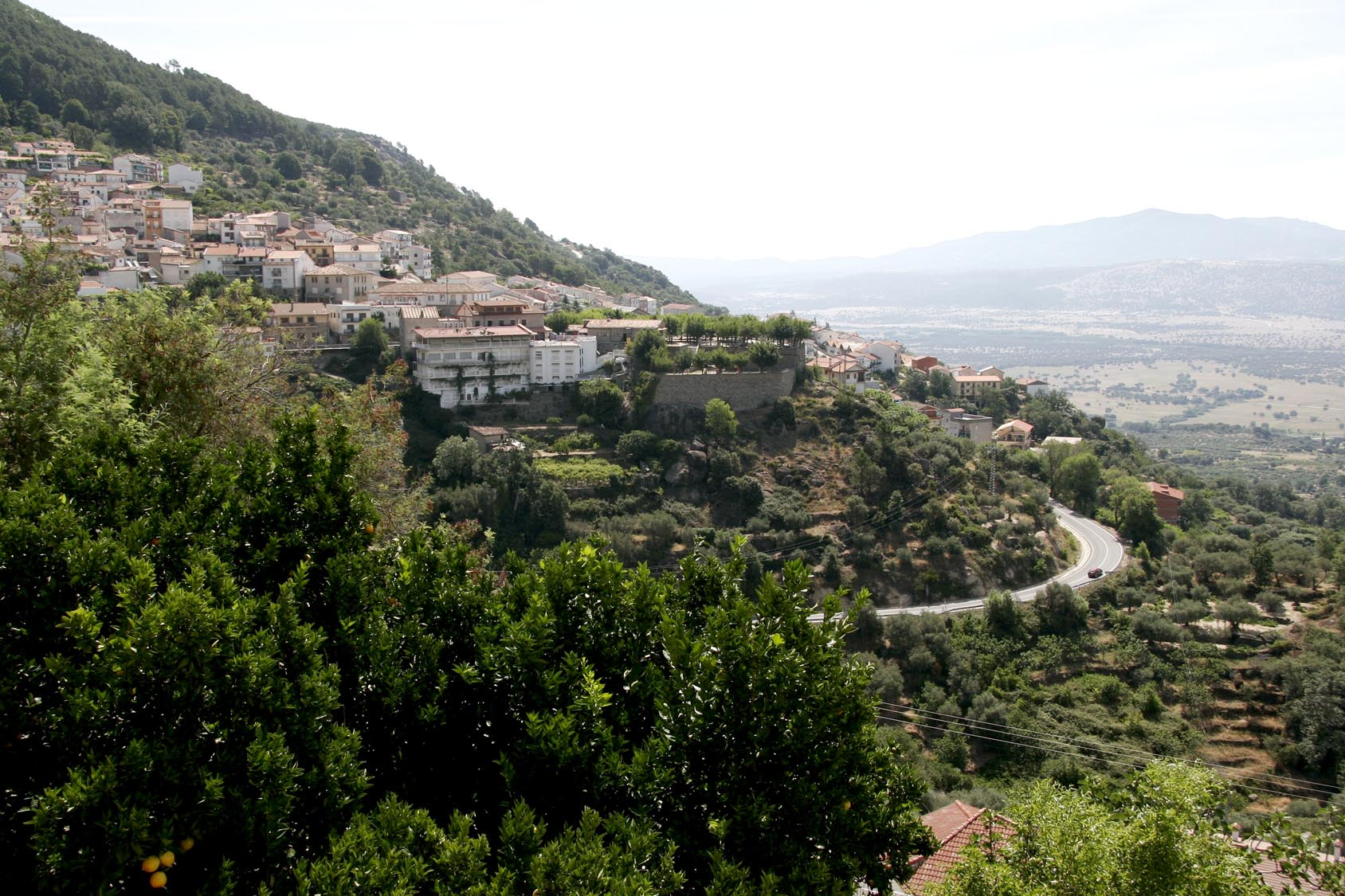
Pedro Bernardo

There is close to nothing known about distant ancestors of Gómez Roji. One uncertain source claims that at least one branch of his grandparents were traditionally related to Pedro Bernardo, a mountainous town on the southern slopes of Sierra de Gredos, in the Ávila province. His father, Pedro Gómez Beades (died 1920), practiced as a surgeon in Pedro Bernardo. One author refers to him as “profesor de cirurgía”, but another one names him rather “practicante”, sort of a rural feldsher. Gómez Beades revealed some penchant for letters and used to write poetry, some of his pieces were published in local press. He married Carolina Josefa Rojí y Sánchez; none of the sources consulted provided any information either on her or on her family. The couple settled in Pedro Bernardo and had 5 children, Ricardo born as the oldest one; his siblings were Dolores, Adriana, Argimiro and Anastasio. None of them became a public figure. Anastasio was killed in 1935; the crime was unrelated to politics.

It is not clear where the young Ricardo commenced his education. One biographer claims that already in 1894 he opted for ecclesiastic career and entered Seminario Pontificio in Comillas, but another source notes that in 1894 he rather entered the local seminary in Ávila, which he reportedly frequented until ordained presbyter in 1906. However, in 1900 he was already recorded by the Cantabrian press as a student of philosophy at Comillas; he distinguished himself as author or religious poems, which he used to recite himself during religious feasts in Comillas. One more author maintains that having completed his initial curriculum, Gómez entered the Comillas seminary as late as in 1902. He pursued theology and one of his fellow seminarians was Pedro Segura y Sáenz, the future primate of Spain. According to some sources he double-majored and is referred to as “dos veces doctor”, namely in theology and in philosophy; he demonstrated interest in broad cultural spectrum and was among most brilliant students recorded at the institution.

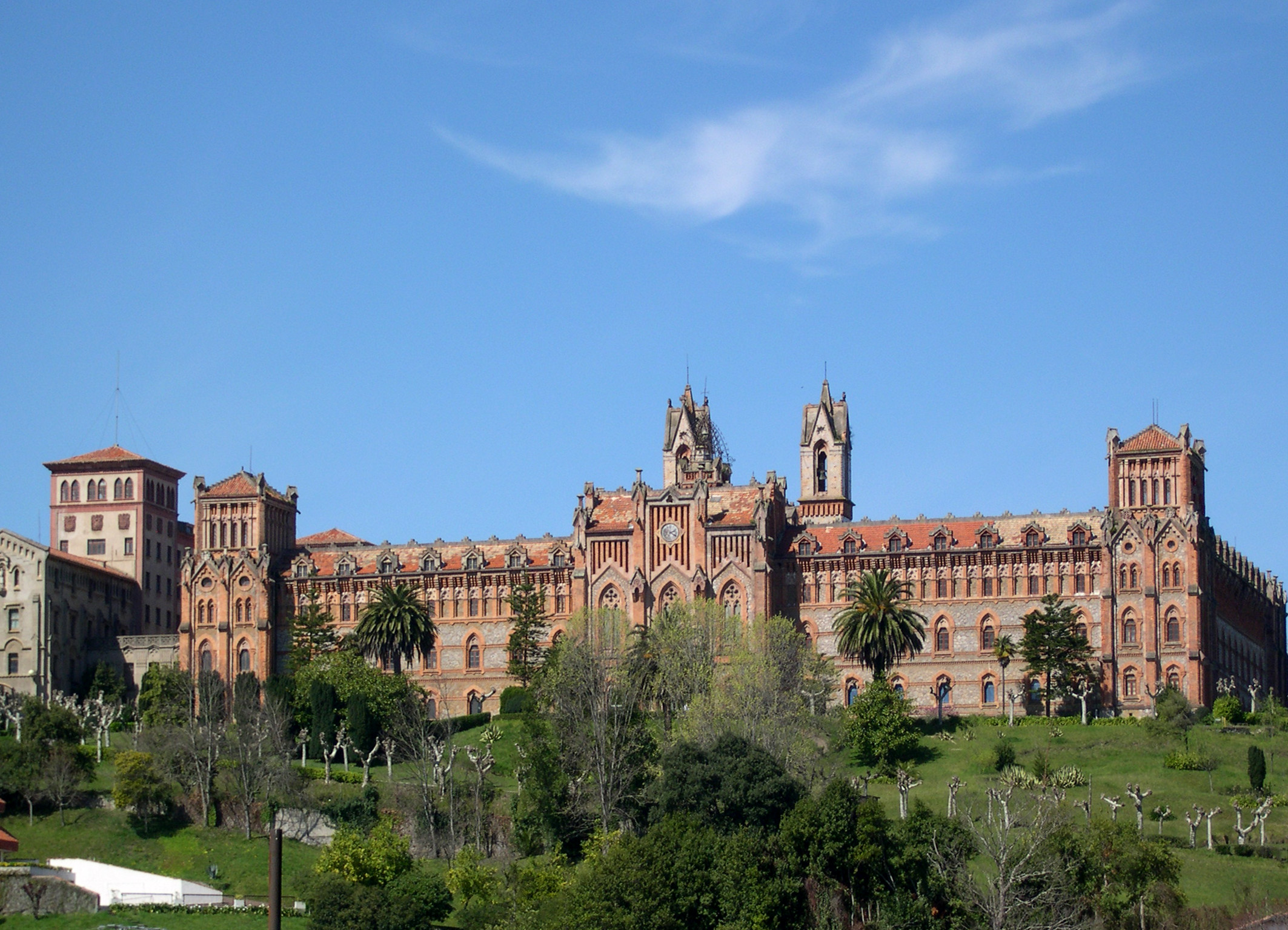
Comillas Pontifical University

Gómez's first assignment was the role of coadjutor in the parish of Calzada de Oropesa, not far away from his native town. It lasted rather briefly since in 1907 he was already in Burgos, active at unspecified posts in various locations; he was noted as giving sermons in the parishes of La Merced, San Lorenzo el Real and San Cosme y San Damián, as well as providing religious service in the female orders of Hijas de María Inmaculada and Santa Dorotea. In 1908 he applied for the vacant post of a lecturing canon at the cathedral, the most prestigious Burgos church and one of the most prestigious sanctuaries in Spain. He faced tough competition of 6 counter-candidates and lost. In 1909 Gómez was delegated to the newly founded parish of Santa Agueda, where he acted as coadjutor. In 1910 Gómez took part in new opposiciones for the cathedral canongia and this time he emerged successful; he would hold the post until death for the following 26 years.

== Religious service: canon, director and professor ==
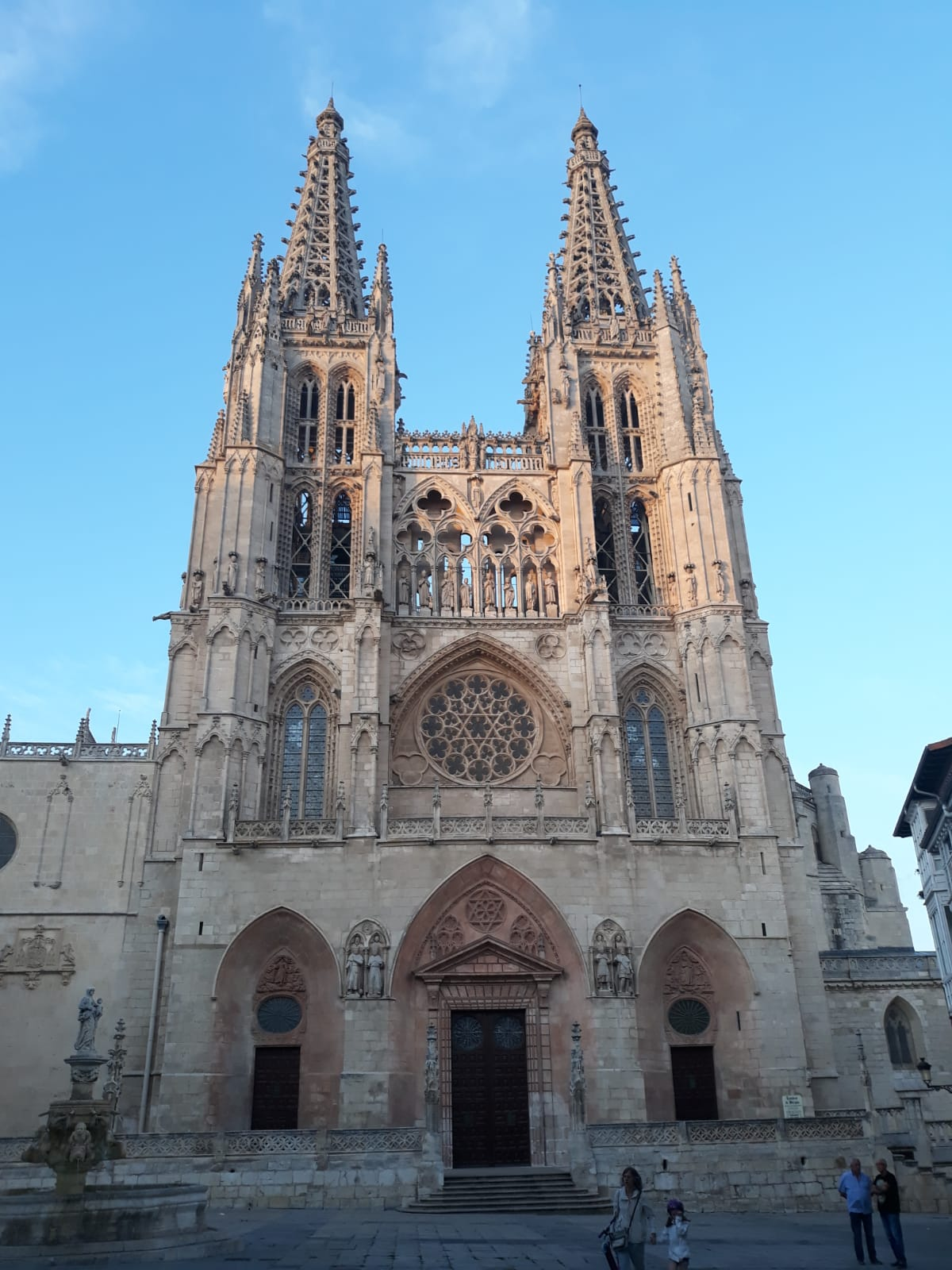
Burgos cathedral

Gómez's role as the lecturing canon was first of all to deliver sermons during religious services at the cathedral; indeed he preached regularly throughout the 1910s and 1920s. Initially little known, in few years he grew to prominence and already in 1914 he was referred to as “elocuente orador”; by mid-decade Gómez was taking to the pulpit during major feasts like the Palm Sunday and in presence of prestigious audience like the local ayuntamiento. In the late 1910s his position in the Burgos community was already well established; not only hailed as “orador sagrado de bien cimentada y merecida fama”, on numerous occasions he had his sermons discussed in detail in local Catholic press, usually acclaimed for doctrinal competence, oratory skills and educational value. He was far less frequently noted as engaged in other routine religious duties; his presence during wedding mass was considered a mark of prestige for the marrying couple.

Apart from delivering sermons Gómez engaged in numerous Burgos-based Catholic organizations. In 1913 he was among the founders of Real Hermandad del Santísimo Cristo de Burgos and by 1917 he grew to the abbot of the brotherhood; he performed the role at least until the late 1920s. In the mid-1910s he became "director espiritual" of Asociación de Devotos de San José de la Montaña and director of Asociación Corte de Honor a Nuestra Señora del Pilar. In the early 1920s Gómez engaged in Unión Misional del Clero and by mid-decade he was member of Junta Directiva of Ateneo de Burgos; in 1928 he became vice-president of Junta Diocesana of Liga de Defensa del Clero and in 1930 he assumed management of Círculo de Estudios of Internado Teresiano in Burgos. As member of some of these organizations Gómez organized pilgrimages, e.g. in 1925 to Rome and the Holy Land; he engaged also in charity, e.g. by contributing to Fiesta de la Caridad. Since the early 1910s he was engaged in buildup of Sindicación Agrícola, local Catholic agrarian trade unions.

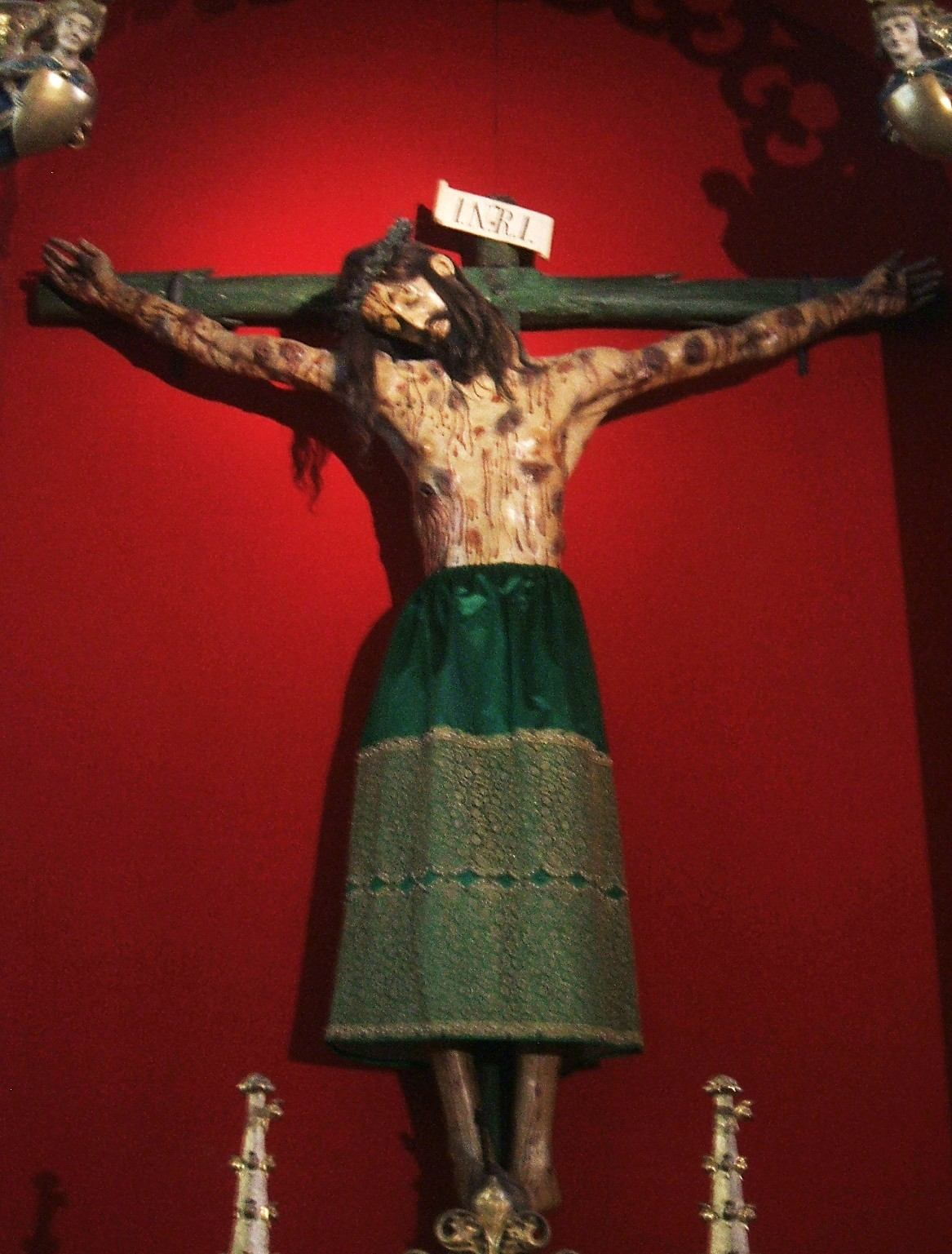
Cristo de Burgos

As competent scholar and good organizer Gómez contributed to major nationwide Catholic projects, e.g. co-organizing Congreso Eucarístico Internacional in Madrid of 1911 or representing the Burgos diocese during preparations to Eucharistic Congress in Rome of 1922; he also took part in countless minor initiatives, like representing Burgos in the 1925 centenary of birth of San Luis Gonzaga. In acknowledgement of his scholarly competence in 1920 he was nominated professor of theology at Seminario de San Jerónimo, the Burgos branch of Universidad Pontificia of Salamanca; he later specialized in dogmatics. In the early 1920s he joined the staff of Pontificio y Real Seminario Español de S. Francisco Javier para Misiones Extranjeras, the Burgos-based papal centre which prepared candidates for missionary service.

== Beyond religion: lecturer, publisher, author ==
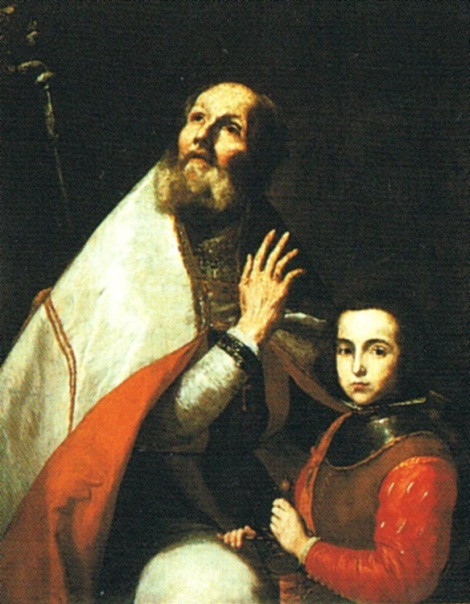
St. Augustine by Ribera

When in the mid-1910s Gómez gained local recognition as orator and theologian he started to give lectures in Catholic institutions and at one-off gatherings, initially in Burgos but soon also elsewhere, e.g. in Madrid, Toledo or Zaragoza. Typically he appeared as guest speaker in various Catholic círculos, cultural Ateneos, Acción Católica premises or other Catholic institutions, less frequently he spoke at scientific or semi-scientific conferences; during dictablanda he was even recorded lecturing a military audience. His favorite topic was St. Augustine and the Augustinian doctrine, though gradually he broadened his interest to arts, literature, language and other manifestations of social psychology; at times he accounted of his foreign voyages, frequent especially in 1928-1929. Regularly featured in the Burgos press, at times he was acknowledged as a distinguished lecturer also in nationwide periodicals; in 1920 he earned a plaza and a street in his native town.

In the late 1900s Gómez commenced co-operation with the ultraconservative Burgos daily El Castellano, at that times owned by Francisco Estévanez. Probably around 1909 the daily was taken over by Acción Católica Diocesana, itself controlled by the archbishopric office. Cardenal Aguirre put Gómez on top of the editorial board, the function he performed until 1920. In 1916 he was appointed president of Comisión Diocesana para la Buena Prensa and in the early 1920s he engaged in Asociación de la Prensa de Burgos. At unspecified time he became director of the local Boletín Eclesiástico. Gómez seldom contributed own journalistic pieces, not necessarily related to religious topics. Rather infrequently he penned analytical articles in specialized Catholic periodicals; the only major works published were Elevaciones sobre la Santísima Virgen y Nuevo mes de Mayo, a set of translations of old Latin prayers, and Hístoria y Preces del Santísimo Cristo de Burgos. The booklet was dedicated to the 14th-century Burgos crucifix; the work discussed its history, traditions related, miracles attributed, its structure and artistic value.

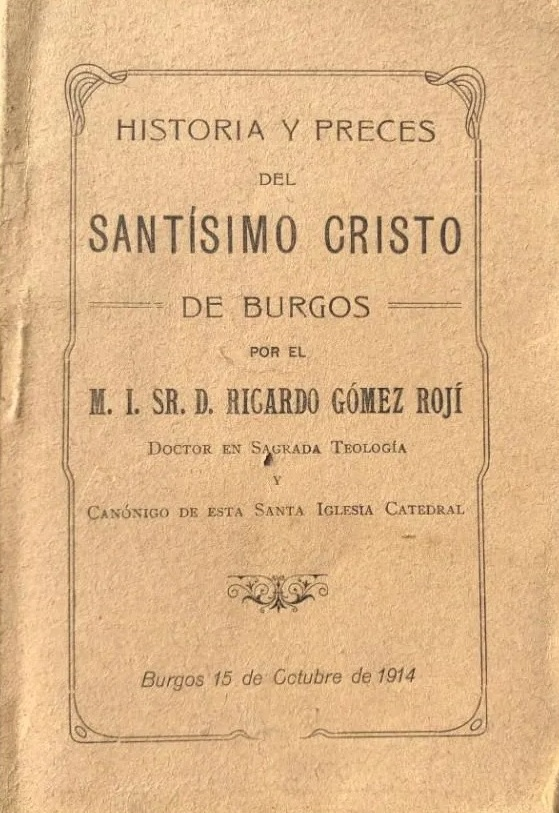
book on Cristo de Burgos

Until the advent of the Republic Gómez was moderately and rather episodically engaged in politics-flavored initiatives. The first of such episodes occurred in 1910, when he engaged in public campaign against a so-called Ley del Candado, a law promoted by the Liberal Party and intended to prevent setup of new religious orders. Gómez co-presided over Burgos public rallies protesting the draft and as part of Cabildo Metropolitano he co-engineered the campaign in the province. Another episode took place during the late Primo de Rivera dictatorship, when Gómez penned a handful of pro-regime articles and participated in government-sponsored initiatives. In 1928 he joined the project of erecting a monument to Cid and seized the opportunity to declare that he “consideraba un deber prestar toda clase de apoyo a la obra del Gobierno actual”. A member of the primoderiverista quasi-party Unión Patriótica, in the 1929 rally he juxtaposed calamities and miseries of late Restoration versus salutary work of the dictator; he hailed UP as a link between the Spanish people and the government. During final months of dictablanda he seemed somewhat bewildered.

== Deputy ==
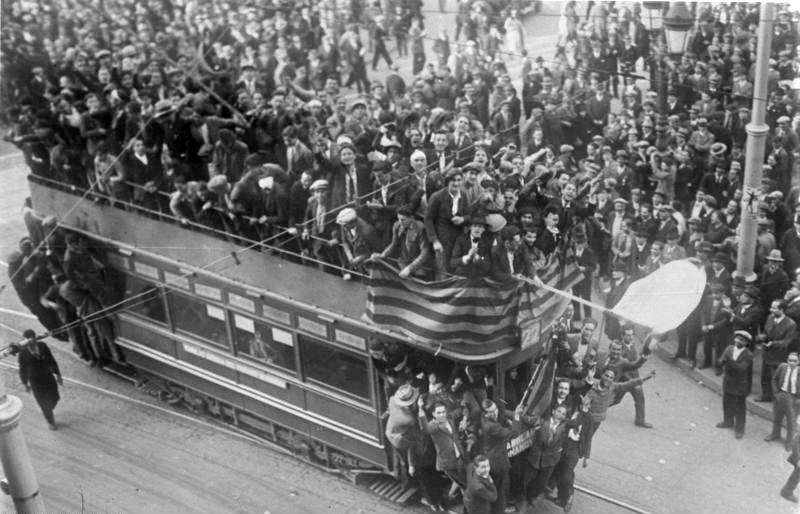
Republic declared, 1931

Following the advent of the Republic Gómez decided to enter politics. He was not a member of any particular political party, though his previous activity clearly located him on the Right. In the 1931 electoral campaign he joined the joint candidature of Bloque Católico-agrario, a local Burgos right-wing alliance of monarchists, conservative landowners and Integrists. The Bloque emergent triumphant and Gómez easily obtained the parliamentary ticket, having been one of 8 priests elected to the chamber. In the Cortes he joined the Agrarian minority and as its representative he took a seat in Comisión de Instrucción. Together with his fellow Burgos deputy Estévanez Rodriguez he formed the most reactionary section of the assembly. Both “repeatedly vented their irritation at parliamentary procedure and, indeed, all things Republican”; in return they were “subjected to ceaseless interruptions and insults from left-wing deputies who regarded them as ‘troglodytes’ and ‘cave-dwellers’“.

Most issues Gómez discussed in the parliament were related to the Church and its role in public life. In general, he was trying to stop the avalanche of secularizing and anti-clerical regulations, advanced by the republican-socialist majority. In particular, he opposed proposed legislation on cemeteries, on religious orders, on marriages and divorces or on Church property rights. The thread he focused on with singular vehemence was education. Gómez defended Catholic schools and advocated the rights of parents to educate children the way they liked; he opposed compulsory secular education and related projects like Misiones Pedagógicas, supposed to “Europeanize” Spain. He frequently clashed on education-related issues with the chief advocate of secular and liberal schooling model, Fernando de los Ríos. He opposed the Catalan autonomy draft and supported female suffrage.

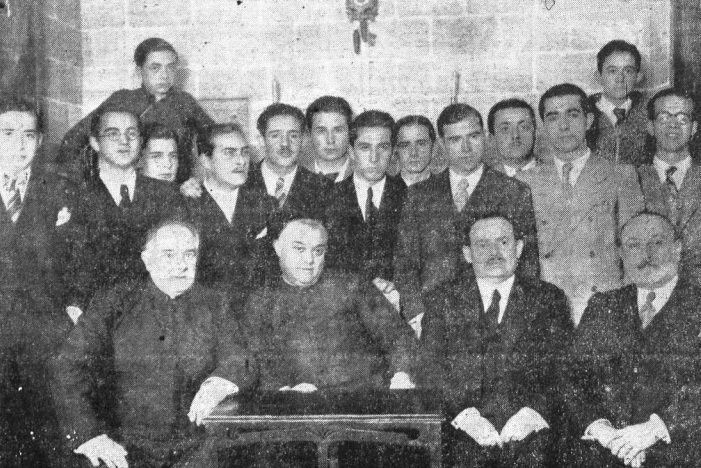
Gómez at a conference of Catholic students, Madrid, 1930s

Gómez turned out to be a very active deputy; the press of 1931-1933 hundreds of times noted him as exchanging arguments during plenary sessions, engaging in debates held by the commission, harassing ministers during question time, submitting legislative amendments or signing protest letters. When unable to get his way overruled by republican-socialist majority, he used to make sure his “voto particular” was recorded; at times he challenged the chamber speaker and accused him of tyrannical mode of presiding. As it became apparent that his efforts to block the republican constitution draft – according to Gómez socializing, anti-Catholic and aimed against the family - were futile he joined a few other MPs who left the chamber in protest instead of taking part in the final voting. Ridiculed by left-wing press for his “tono ambiguo, casi cariñoso y paternal”, he was once assaulted on the street and received a few punches.

== Carlist ==
Some authors claim that already in 1931 Gómez was elected as a Carlist, yet there is no evidence of his links to legitimist politics prior to mid-1932. Since the 1910s appreciated by the Burgos Jaimistas and in 1931 once speaking in the Cortes on behalf of “minoría católica navarra”, he was much closer to the Integrist breed of Traditionalism. However, since 1932 he started to appear on Carlist rallies and in June accepted Don Alfonso Carlos’ nomination to Consejo de Cultura, a Carlist board of pundits entrusted with guarding the Traditionalist doctrinal orthodoxy. Still member of the Agrarian minority in the Cortes, in 1933 he was already fairly frequently taking part in Carlist conferences, rallies and feasts; late in the year he took part in the Carlist pilgrimage to Italy, which included homages to remnants of defunct legitimist pretenders. Prior to the 1933 electoral campaign the Carlists included him among proposed right-wing alliance candidates in Burgos, but eventually they bowed to the pressure of CEDA and Gómez fell off the list. He joined Coalición Católico-Agraria Burgalesa, led by José María Albiñana; he narrowly missed the electoral threshold during the first round and lost also in by-elections one month later.

Some authors claim that Gómez was “deeply hurt” about having been dropped from the original alliance list, yet in fact he got even closer to Carlism. He contributed to the party mouthpiece El Siglo Futuro, praised “our Comunión Tradicionalista” as the backbone of Spain, spoke at Carlist-only rallies, addressed Requeté and Margaritas organizations, appeared at Carlist círculos, hailed Carlist martyrs, consecrated Carlist standards and was acclaimed as "nuestro coreligionario”. He was also co-author of a Carlist political statement, aimed against the Alfonsine dynasty. By late 1935 he explicitly and publicly embraced the Carlist identity when hailing “Dios, Patria y Rey” and “nuestro Augusto Caudillo”, the legitimist pretender Don Alfonso Carlos. Except the seat in Consejo de Cultura Gómez did not held any post in the party.

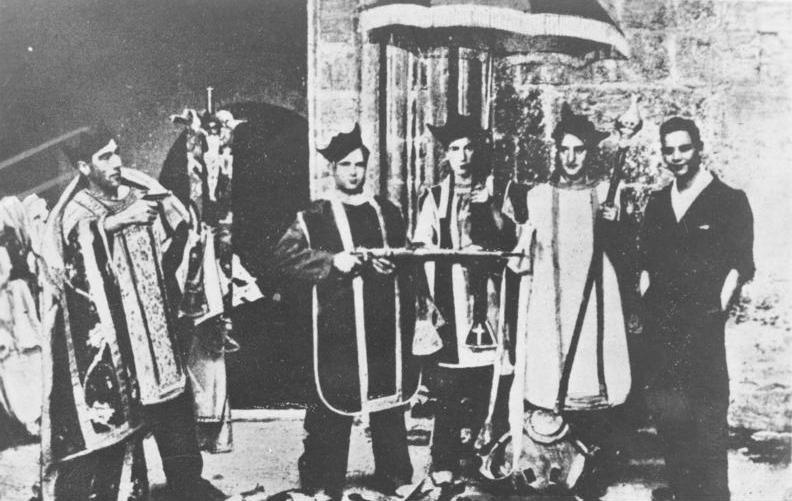
Republican militia in plundered church, Madrid 1936

Gómez did not stand in the 1936 elections and none of the sources consulted provides information whether he intended to. Since 1934 he focused rather on advancing the Traditionalist cause in daily press, contributed analytical studies on culture to more in-depth periodicals like Tradición, investigated “sectas y sociedades secretas” and published articles on art, culture, anthropology and social psychology. Having lost the Cortes ticket he returned to Burgos and resumed his sermons and the usual service of the cathedral canon; at one opportunity he was again physically assaulted. The July 1936 coup caught him in Madrid. On 22 July a combined patrol of policemen, Guardia Civil and militiamen came to arrest him, but in unclear circumstances he managed to avoid detention. However, on August 15 another patrol visited a convent looking for him, and this time Gómez was taken away. Details of his death are not clear; it is presumed he was executed the same day by the roadside between Madrid and Hortaleza, where his corpse has been found.

== See also ==
- Traditionalism (Spain)
- Carlism
- Integrism (Spain)
- Spanish Agrarian Party
- El Castellano (1900-1940)
