= La Merced Church =

- La Merced Church, Antigua Guatemala
- La Merced Church, Burgos
- Convento de la Merced in Valdunquillo
- La Merced Cloister in Mexico City

== See also ==
- es:Iglesia de la Merced
- Our Lady of Mercy Church
