= Valdunquillo =

- Municipality
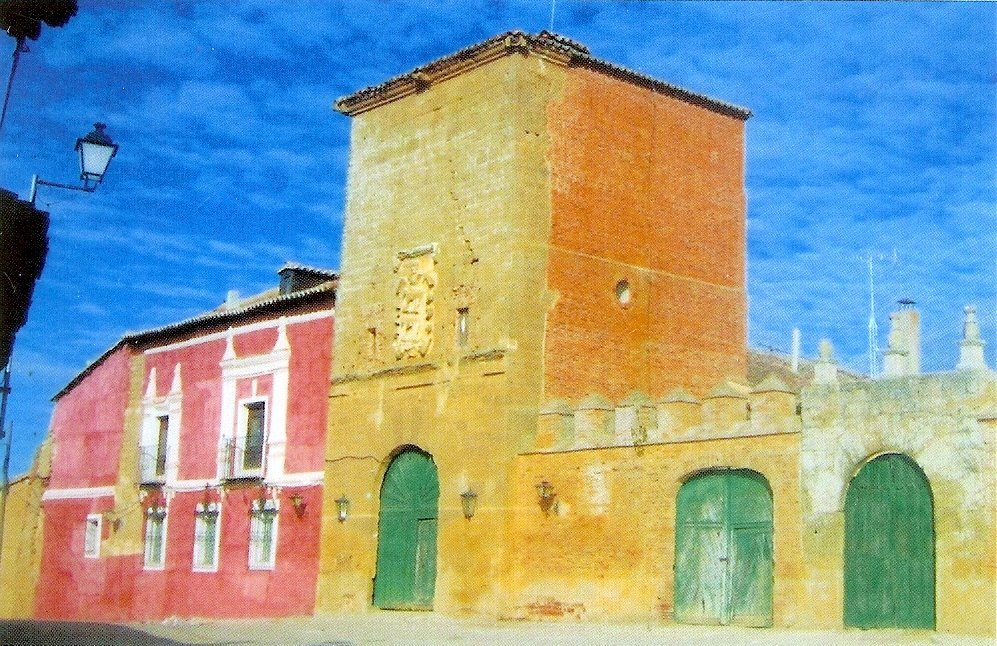
- Palace of the Dukes of Alba

- Coat of arms

- Location of Valdunquillo

- Location in Spain
- Coordinates: 42°2′0″N 5°43′19″W
- Country: Spain
- Autonomous community: Castile and León
- Province: Valladolid
- Comarca: Tierra de Campos
- Judicial district: Medina de Rioseco
- Founded: See text

Government
  - Alcalde: Máximo Baza Pastor (2007)

Area
  - Total: 30.8 km^{2} (11.9 sq mi)
- Elevation: 741 m (2,431 ft)

Population (2025-01-01)
  - Total: 111
  - Density: 3.60/km^{2} (9.33/sq mi)
- Time zone: UTC+1 (CET)
  - Summer (DST): UTC+2 (CEST)
- Postal code: 47672
- Dialing code: 983
- Official language(s): Spanish
- Website: Official website

Valdunquillo is a municipality located in the province of Valladolid, Castile and León, Spain. According to the 2004 census (INE), the municipality has a population of 179 inhabitants. The town's residents traditionally call themselves "lechugeros," a testament to the fact that the town had a good reputation for cultivating lettuce. Valdunquillo is adjacent to the towns La Unión de Campos, Villalogán, Bolaños de Campos, Valderas, Medina de Rioseco, and Villavicencio de los Caballeros.

== History ==
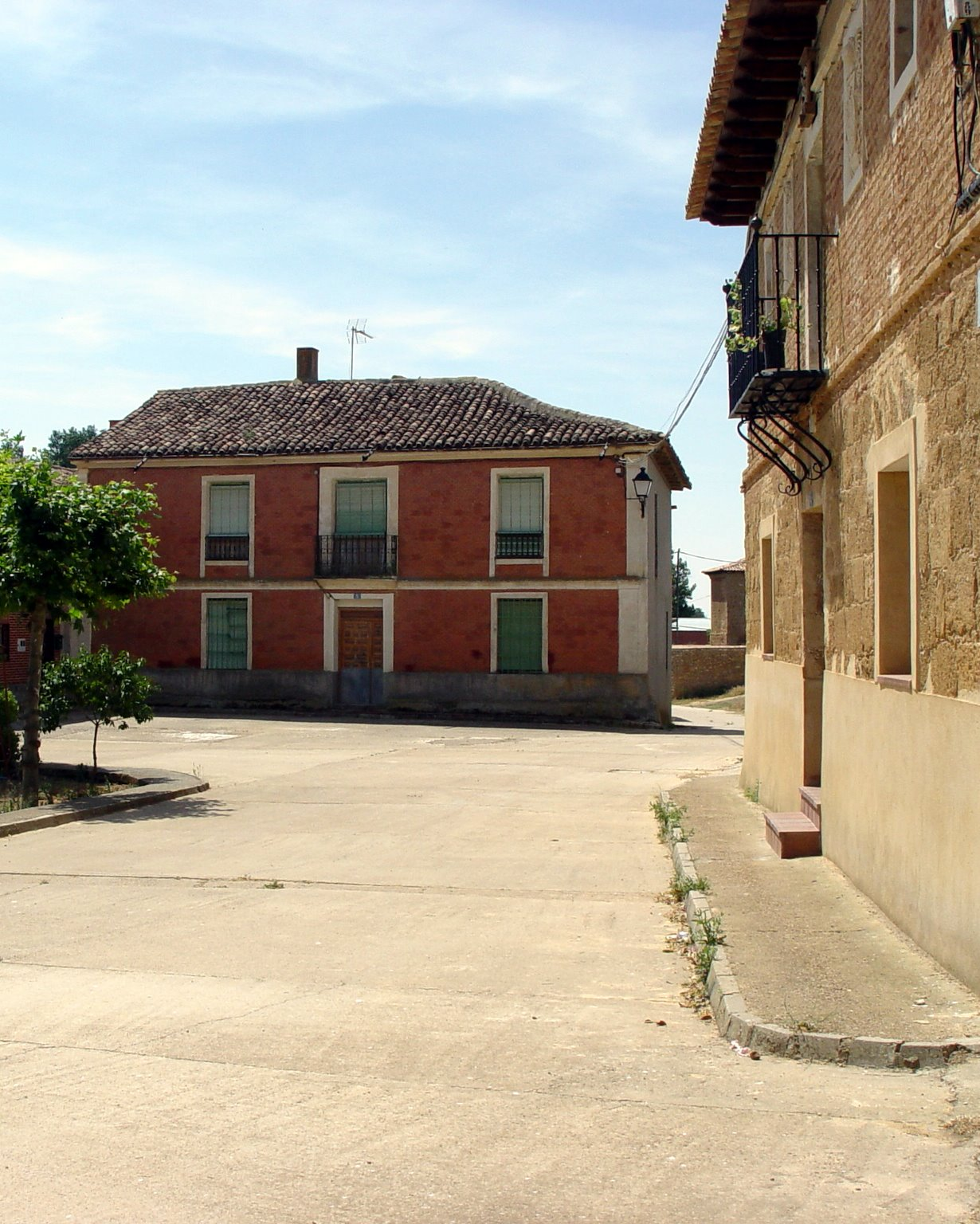
Corner of the Plaza Doctor Bárcena

Valdunquillo has been occupied by Christians, Jews, and Muslims. However, archaeological evidence shows that the area was likely first inhabited by the Vaccaei. The first written reference of the town appears in a document, dating to the year 1126, in which the Countess Doña Mayor donates to the monastery of Sahagún. In another donation, dating to the year 1192, it is referred to as "Valle de Junquello," perhaps the origin of its present-day name. On March 5, 1368, King Enrique II ceded the town to Alvar Pérez Osorio. The Osorio family formed much of the town's history, and promoted its convent. On May 1, 1623, King Philip IV of Spain granted Francisca de Valdés Osorio the marquisate of Valdunquillo.

== About the Town ==
The architecture of Valdunquillo consists mainly of adobe and brick with tile roofs, typical of Castile. Also typical of the area are its many palomares. The town is part of the comarca, Tierra de Campos. The area's first inhabitants were the Vaccaei, then it was occupied by the Romans, and then the Goths. It was also the border between Muslims and Christians during the Middle Ages. During the Medieval era and the Renaissance, the area was the breadbasket of Spain. As time passed, its importance declined, and people fled to large cities, like Valladolid, Sevilla, Madrid, and Barcelona.

== Monuments ==
- Convento de la Merced: Founded in 1607, the Mercedarian convent today serves as the actual San Pedro Church. The brick building was built in the 18th century. Although its façade is somewhat austere, inside it is ornate, with gilded altars and religious works of art.
- Palace of the Dukes of Alba: This small palace dates to at least the 17th century. It belonged to the Osorio family, whose family coat of arms is engraved above the main entrance. Up until now, the palace belonged to the Duchess of Alba, a descendant of the Osorio family, who is Marchioness of Valdunquillo. It has now been restored to be the home of a private owner.
- San Pedro Church: From the 18th century, all that is left of the church are the ruins of its tower, popularly known as "The Fallen Tower."
- Santa María Church: Built in the 16th century, the church is now not only in ruins, but is also private property now. Its mudéjar-styled arch still stands, as well as two cupolas.
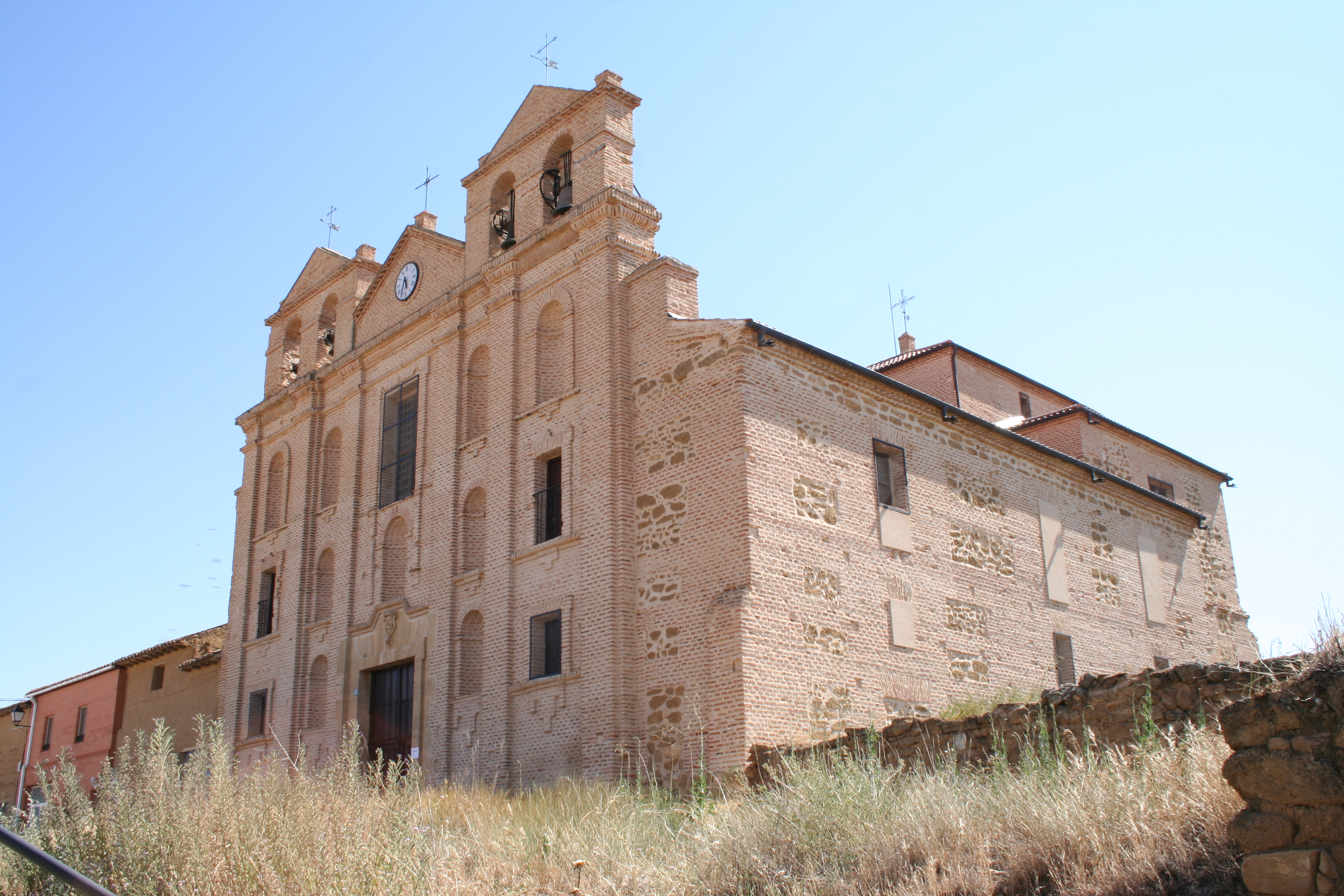
Convento de la Merced

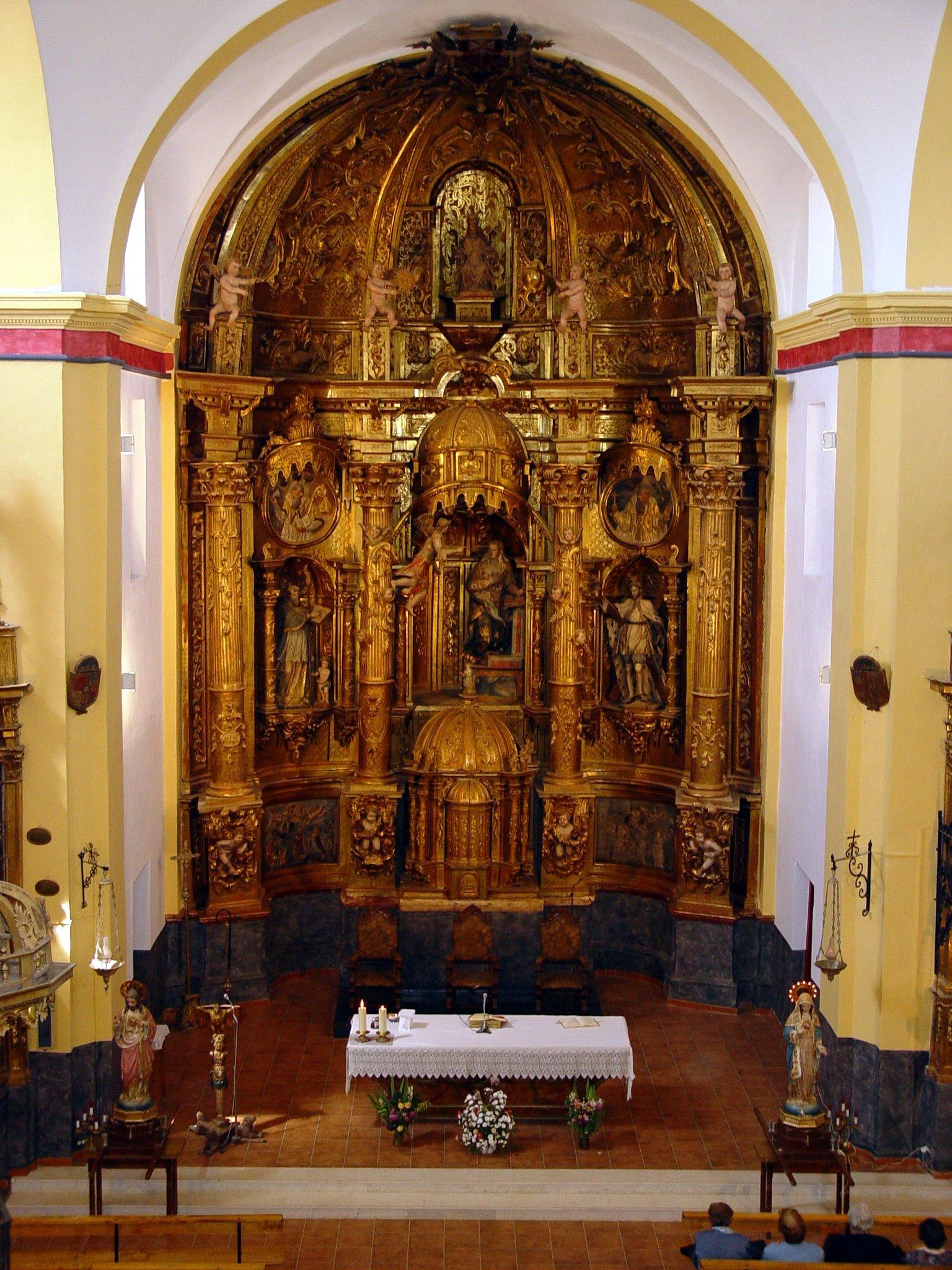
The retablo in el Convento de la Merced

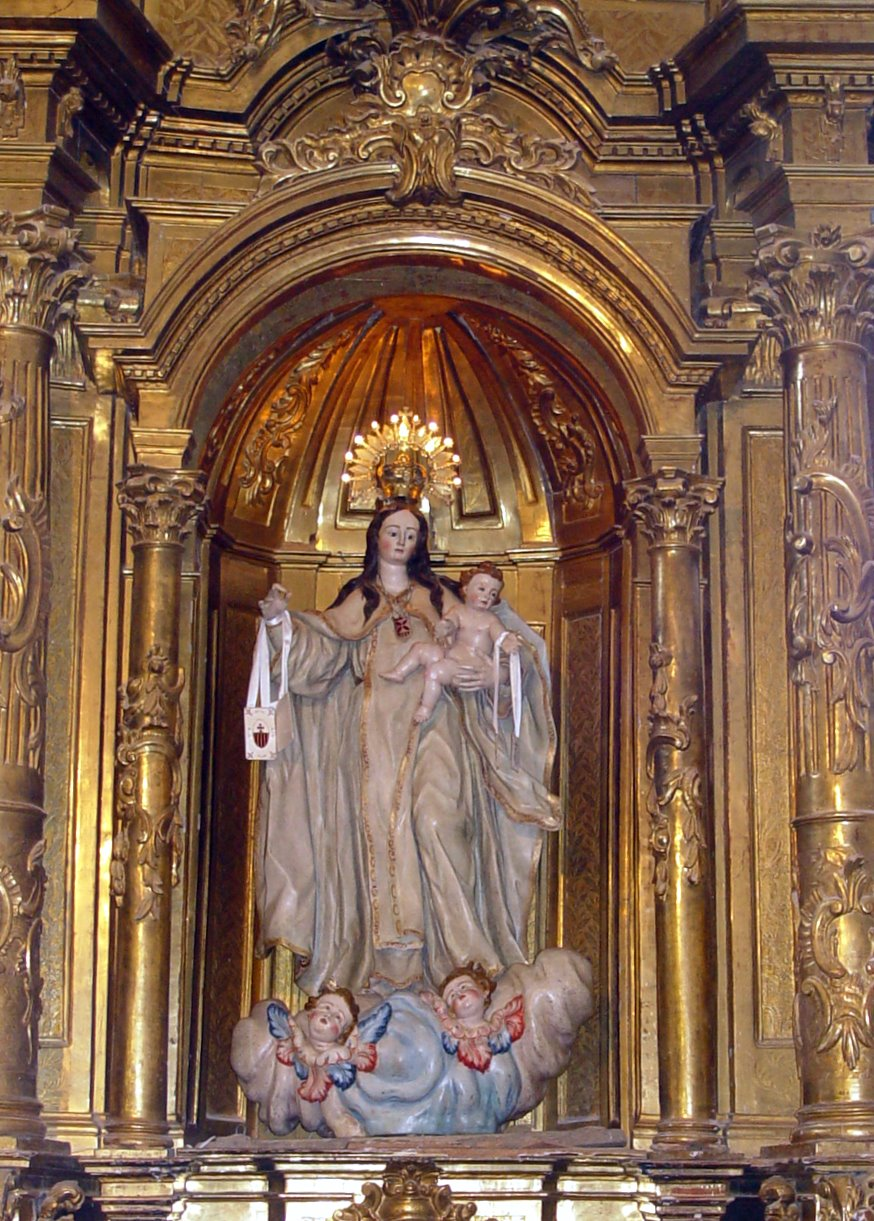
Our Lady of Mercy, patroness of the Convento de la Merced

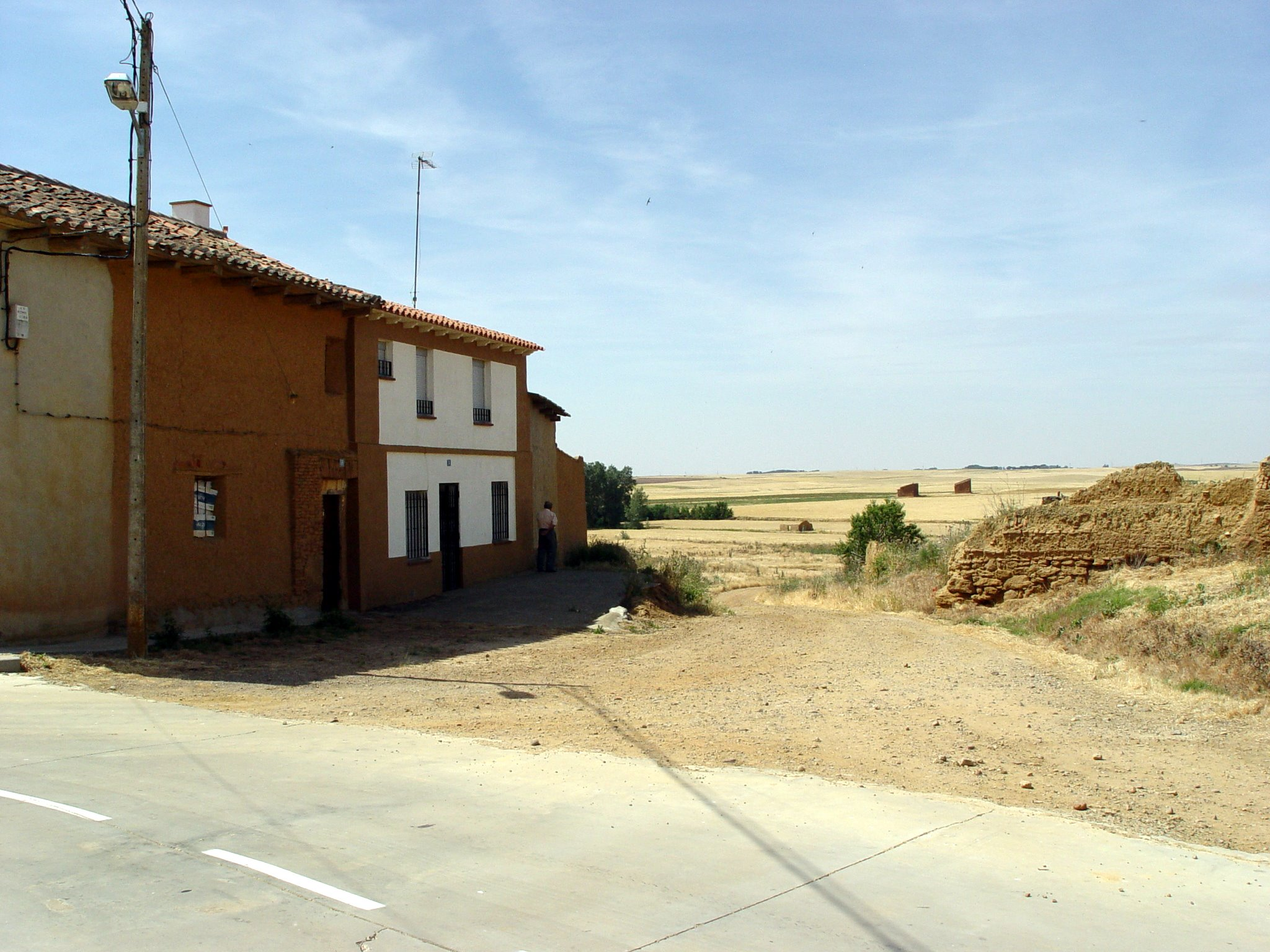
Two simple houses, adjacent to the Convento de la Merced

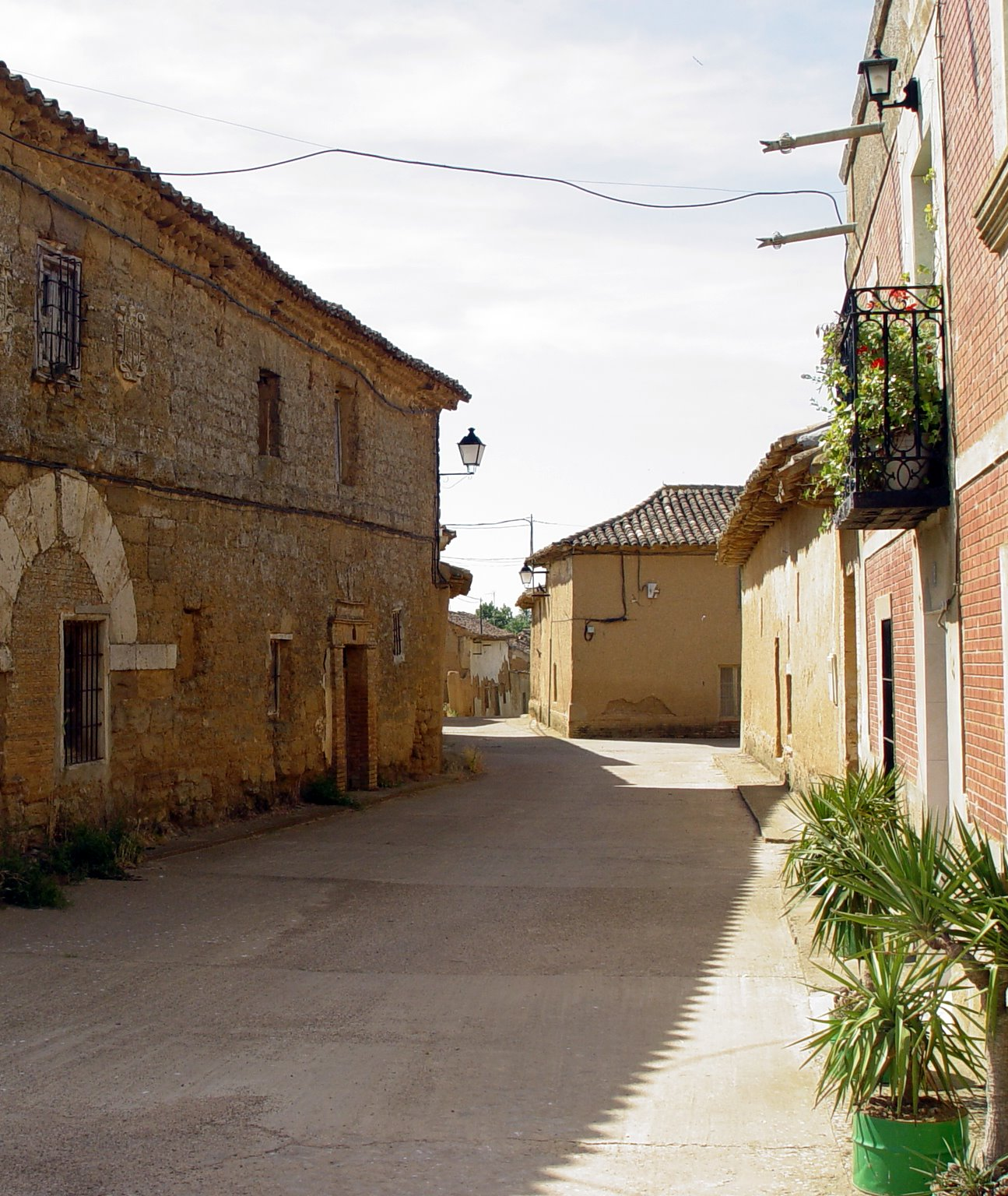
A street in Valdunquillo

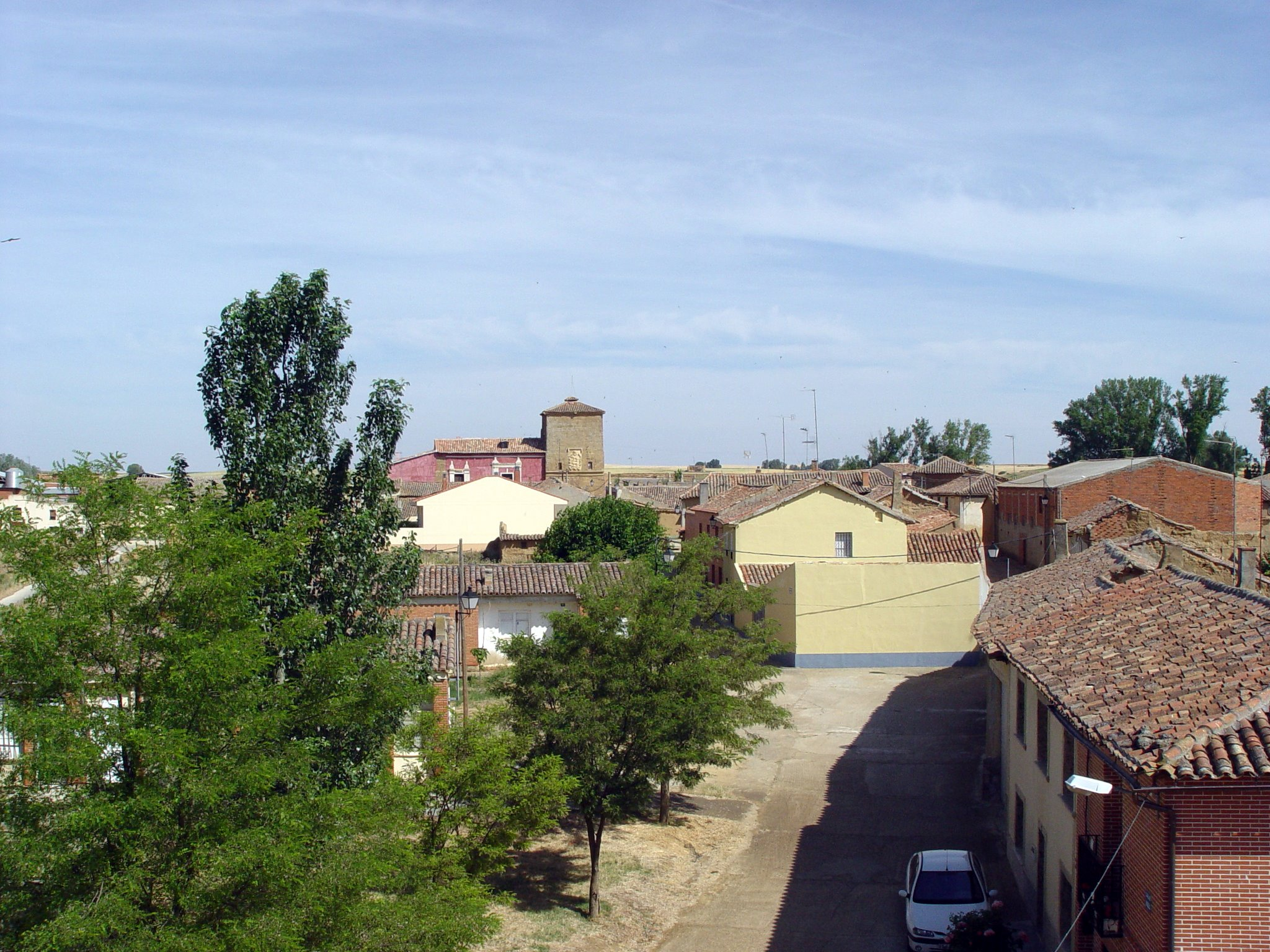
A view of Valdunquillo, with the Palace of the Dukes of Alba in the background (the Pink building)

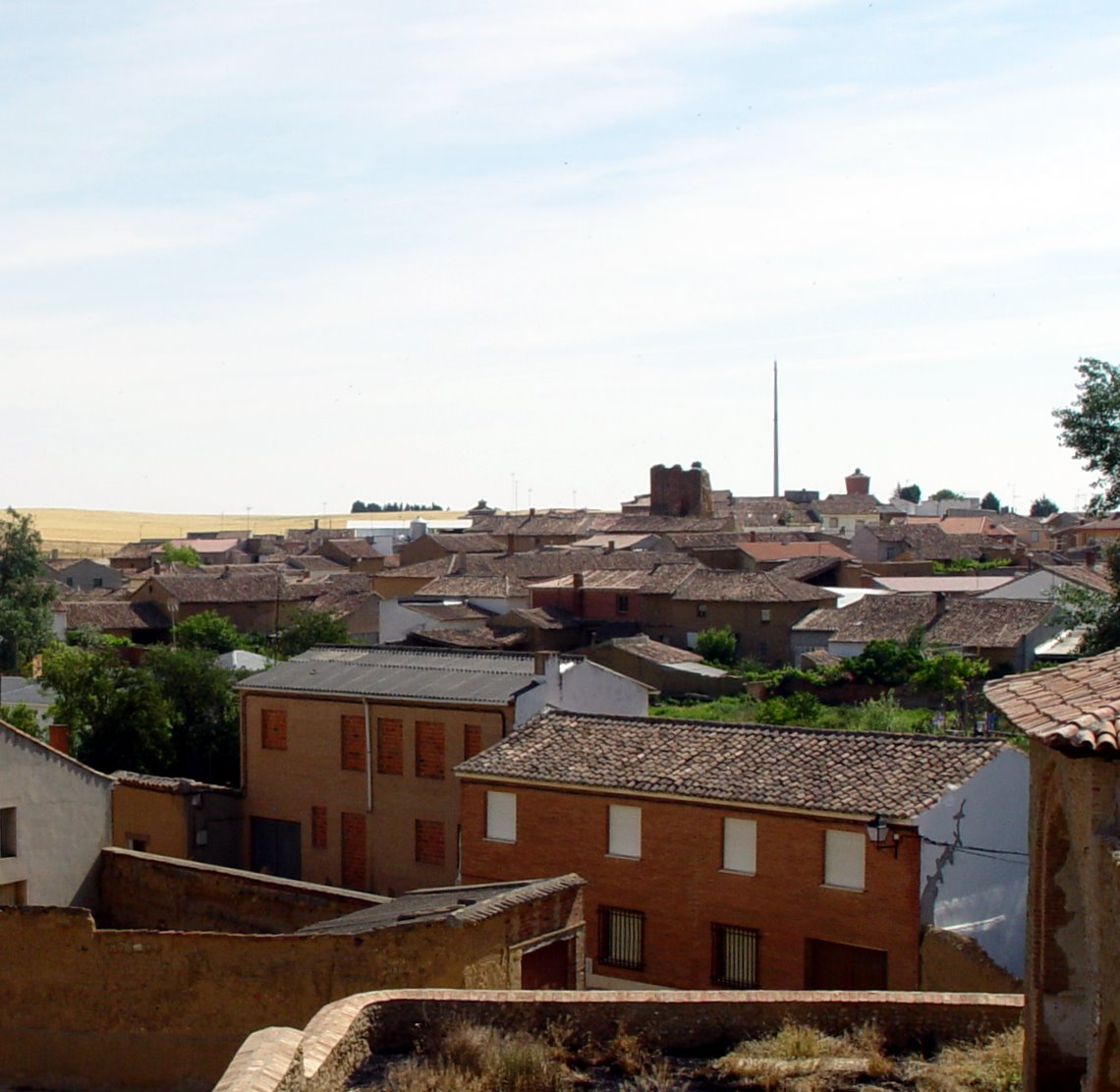
A view of Valdunquillo

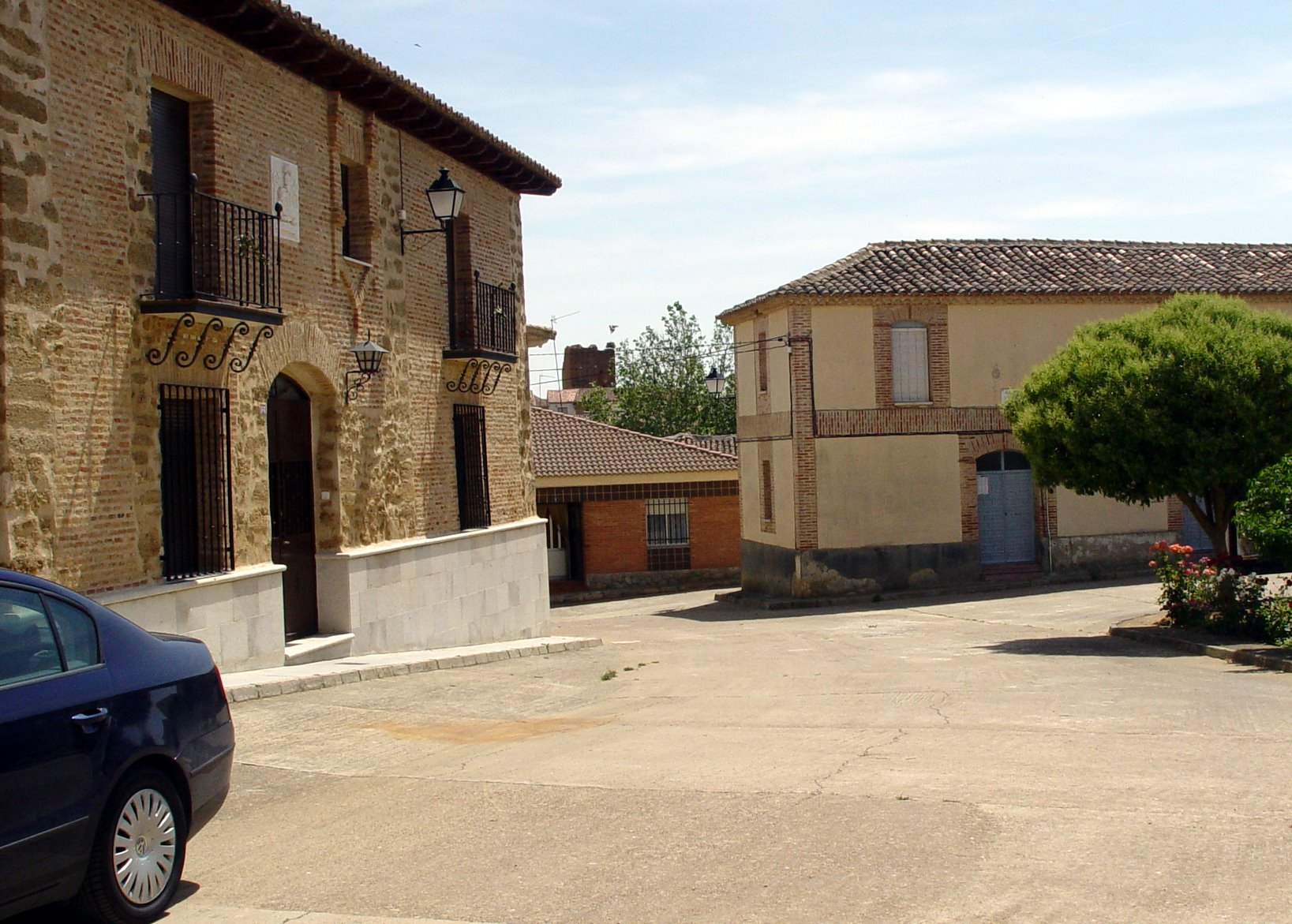
Another corner of the la Plaza Doctor Bárcena
