= Pedro Bernardo =

- municipality
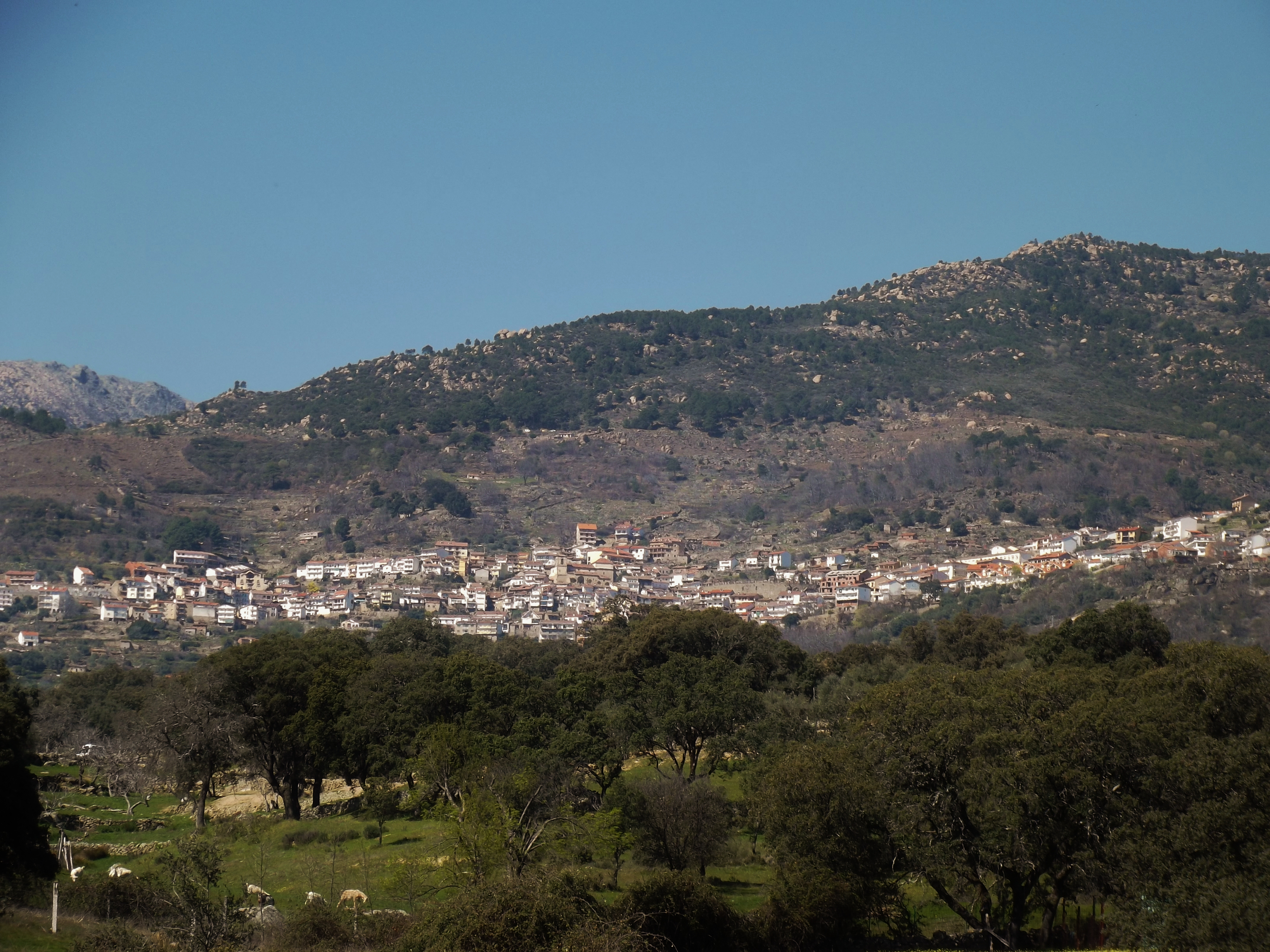

- Flag Coat of arms

- Location in Spain. Pedro Bernardo (Spain)
- Coordinates: 40°14′34″N 4°54′53″W
- Country: Spain
- Autonomous community: Castile and León
- Province: Ávila

Area
  - Total: 69 km^{2} (27 sq mi)
- Elevation: 801 m (2,628 ft)

Population (2025-01-01)
  - Total: 743
  - Density: 11/km^{2} (28/sq mi)
- Time zone: UTC+1 (CET)
  - Summer (DST): UTC+2 (CEST)
- Website: Official website

Pedro Bernardo is a municipality located in the province of Ávila, Castile and León, Spain.

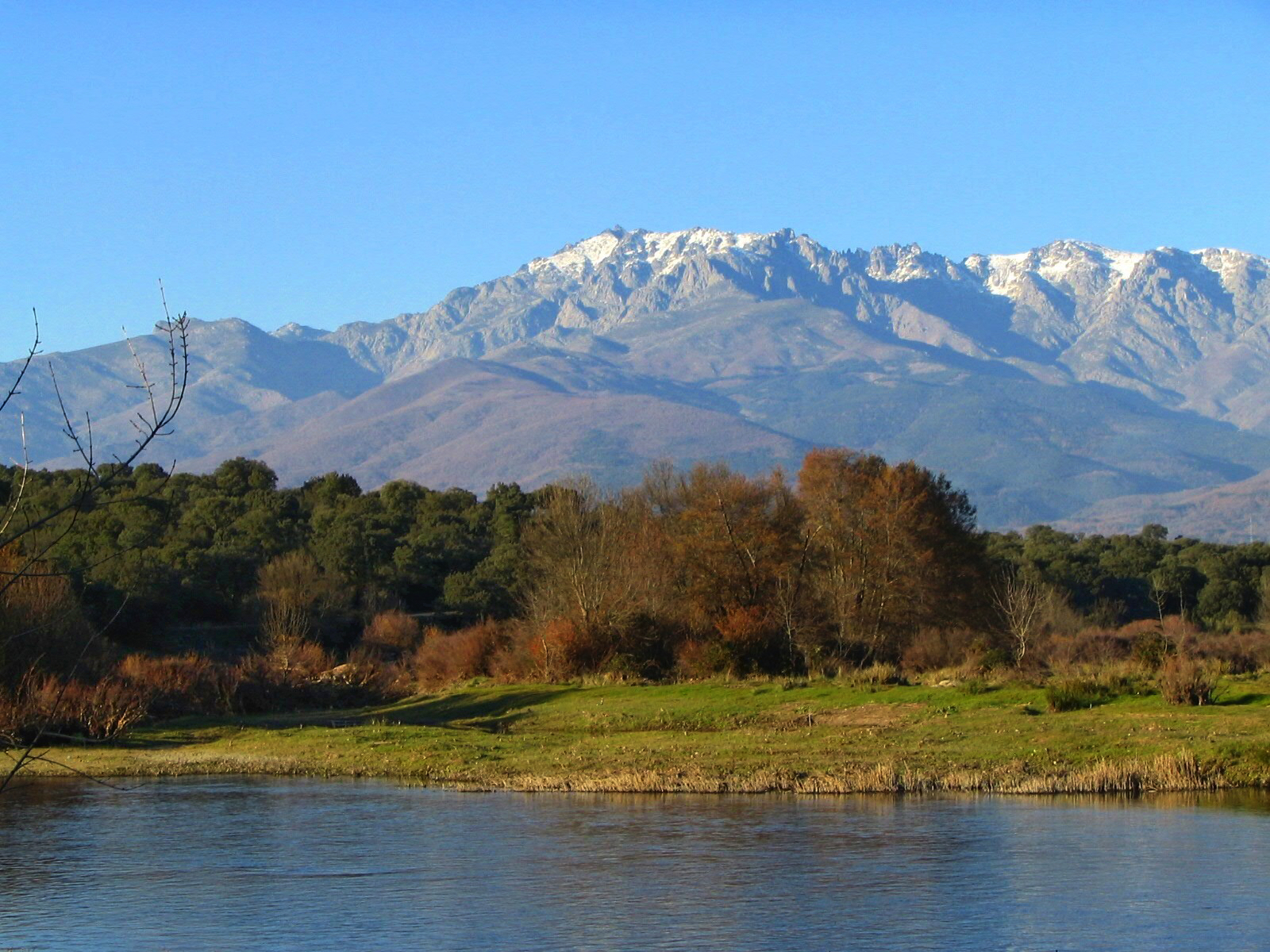
Tiétar River with the Sierra de Gredos mountain range at last.

== Population ==
Historical population
| Year | Pop. | ±% p.a. |
|---|---|---|
| 2023 | 771 | — |
| 2024 | 758 | −1.69% |
| 2025 | 743 | −1.98% |
Source: INE
