= San Cosme y San Damián, Burgos =

Church in Burgos, Spain

Coordinates: 42°20′12″N 3°42′07″W

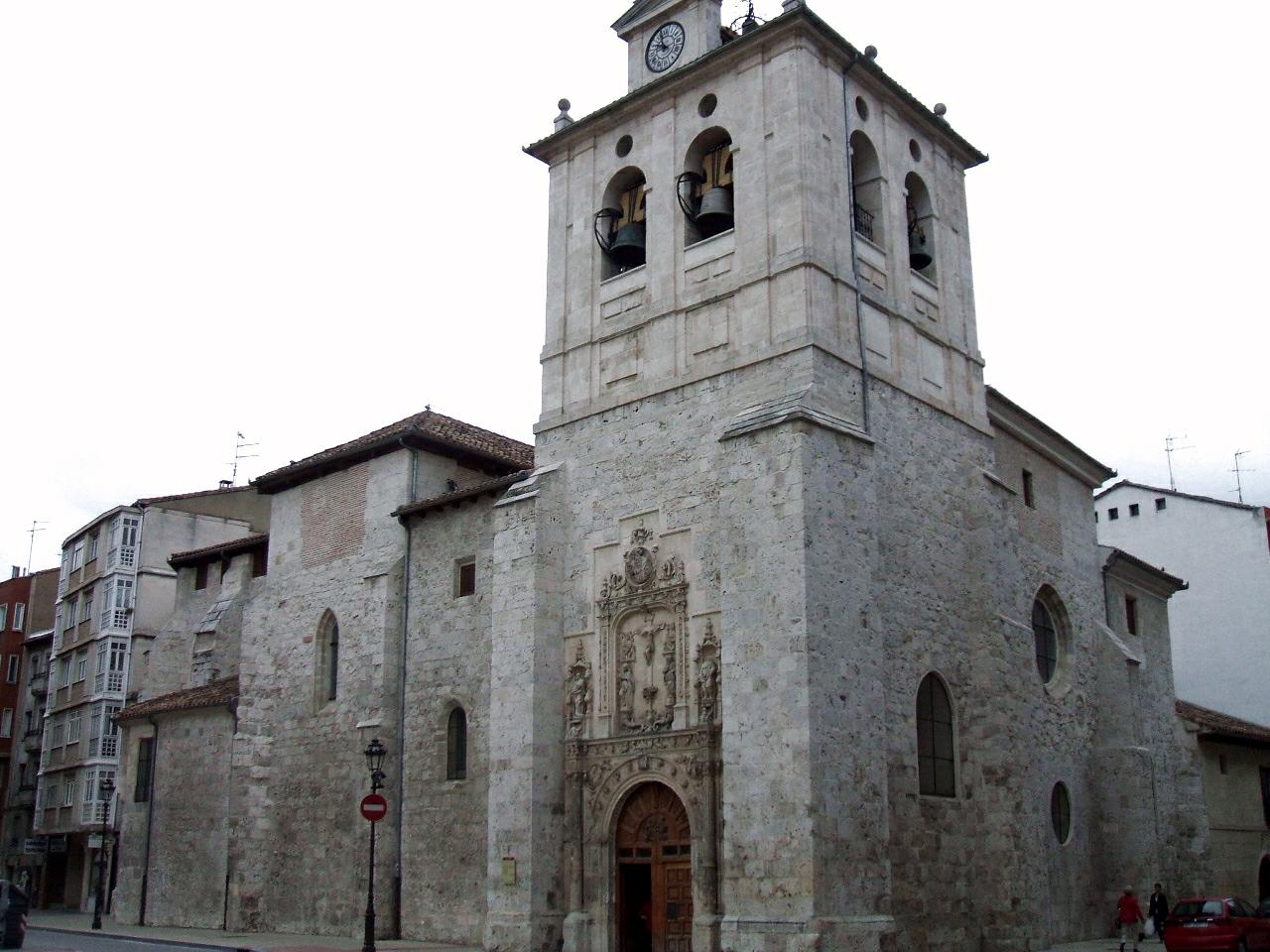

Iglesia de San Cosme y San Damián is a Catholic parish church in Burgos, Spain, on the left bank of the Arlanzón River. It was built in the sixteenth century with a combination of the Late Gothic and Renaissance styles. It was a burial place of featured artists of the time.

The porch on the north side was designed by Juan de Vallejo in 1552, with a triumphal arch with medallions of John the Baptist and John the Evangelist in the spandrels and fine fluted columns. The massive tower of the church, of the classicist baroque style, was added in 1621 by Gabriel de Cotero.
