= Villavicencio de los Caballeros =

Coordinates: 42°04′N 5°14′W

Villavicencio de los Caballeros, Spain
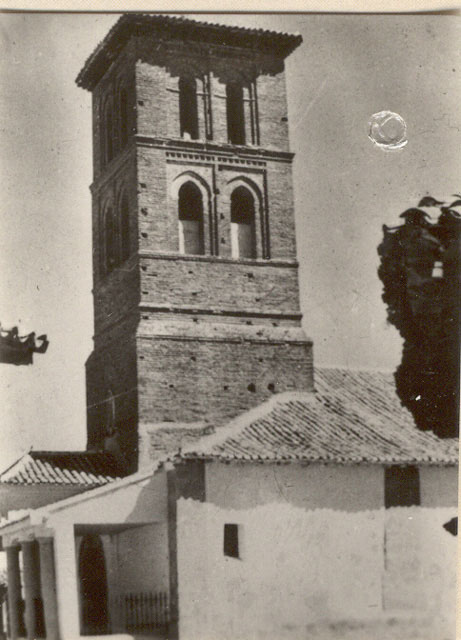
- Country: Spain
- Autonomous community: Castile and León
- Province: Valladolid
- Municipality: Villavicencio de los Caballeros

Area
  - Total: 36.06 km^{2} (13.92 sq mi)
- Elevation: 720 m (2,360 ft)

Population (2025-01-01)
  - Total: 215
  - Density: 5.96/km^{2} (15.4/sq mi)
- Time zone: UTC+1 (CET)
  - Summer (DST): UTC+2 (CEST)

Villavicencio de los Caballeros is a municipality located in the province of Valladolid, Castile and León, Spain. According to the 2004 census (INE), the municipality had a population of 294 inhabitants.
