= San Lorenzo el Real, Burgos =

Church building in Burgos, Spain

Coordinates: 42°20′33″N 3°42′02″W

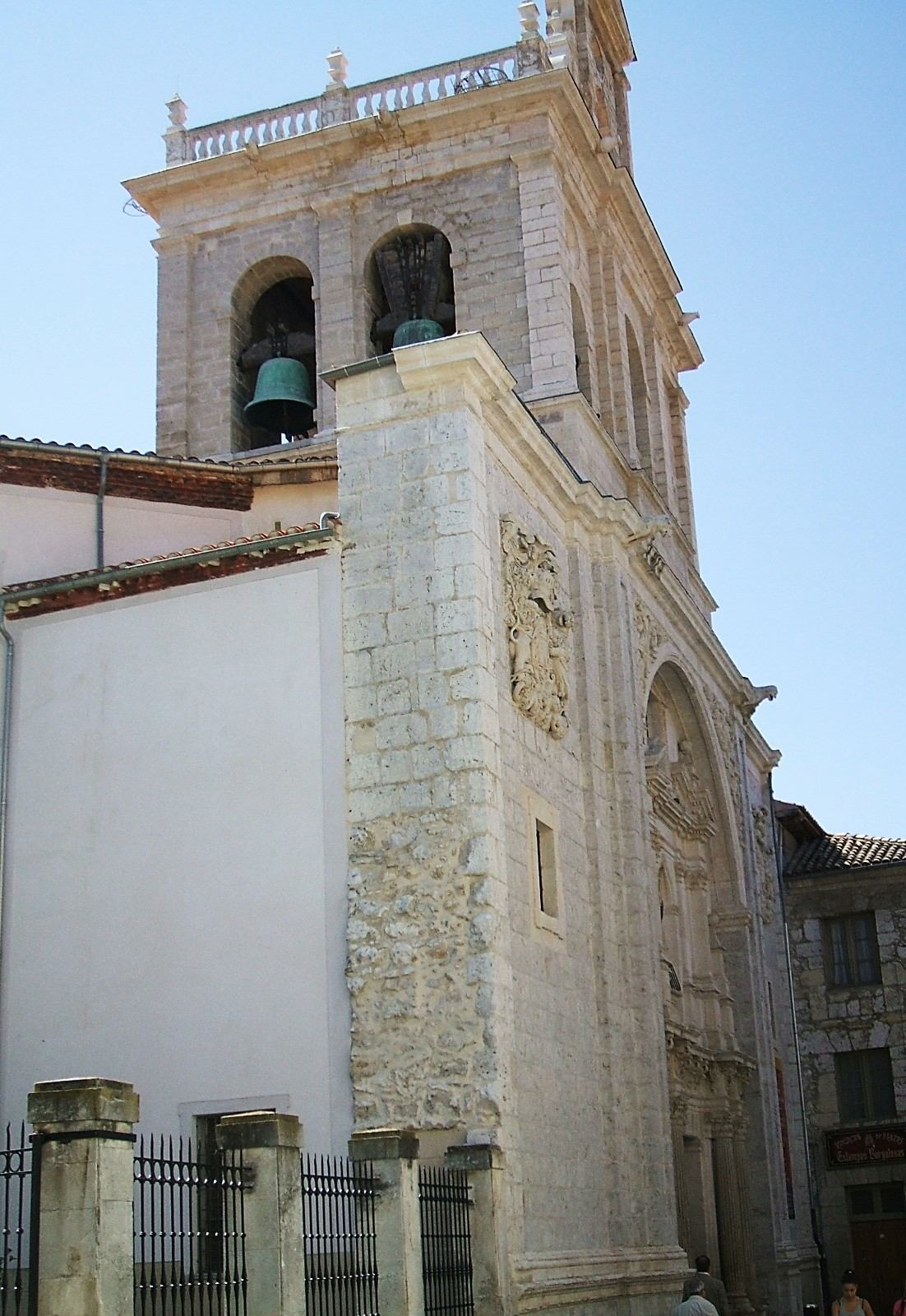
Iglesia de San Lorenzo el Real

Iglesia de San Lorenzo el Real is a Baroque church in Burgos, Spain. It is located on Calle Almirante Bonifaz. San Lorenzo was originally a Jesuit church, built between 1684 and 1694 to replace an earlier building of more modest proportions. The work was financed and sponsored by Francisca de San Vítores and erected by Bernabé de Hazas and Francisco del Pontón. After the expulsion of the Jesuits in the late eighteenth century, the church became a parish church. Since its creation in 1945, the church has been the seat of the Brotherhood of Coronación de Espinas y de Cristo Rey.

== See also ==
- List of Jesuit sites
