= St. Peter's Church, Valdunquillo =

Coordinates: 42.0394°N 5.3121°W

Church of St. Peter
- Iglesia de San Pedro
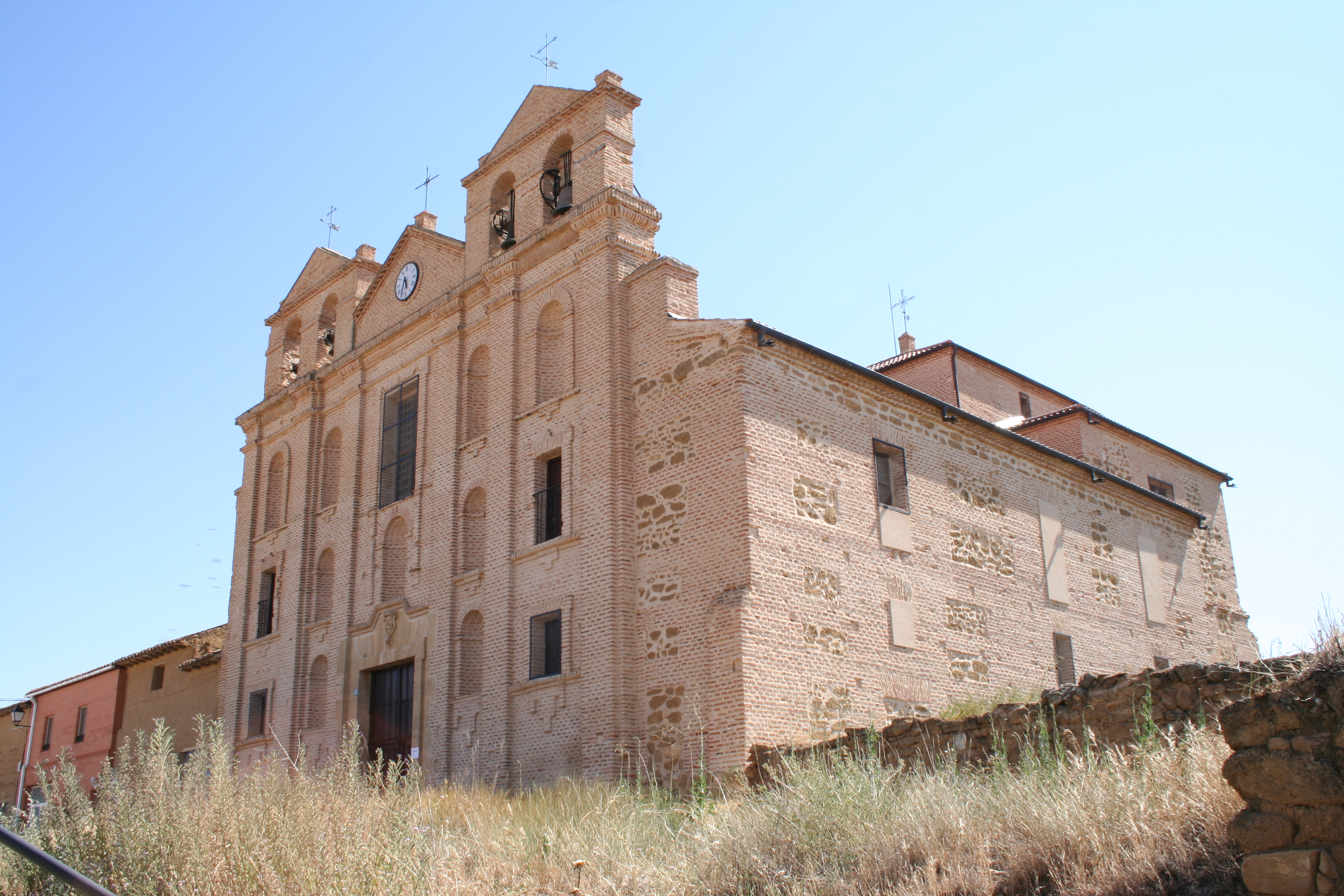
- San Pedro Church, formerly part of the Convento de Mercedarios Descalzos
- Church of St. Peter
- Location: 47672 Valdunquillo, Valladolid
- Country: Spain
- Denomination: Catholic
- Religious order: Discalced Mercedarians (1607-19th c.)

History
- Former name: Our Lady of the Incarnation (Nuestra señora de la Encarnación)
- Founded: 1607
- Dedication: St. Peter

Architecture
- Functional status: Parish church
- Architectural type: Classicism
- Style: brick
- Years built: 18th c.

Administration
- Archdiocese: Valladolid

Clergy
- Archbishop: Luis J. Argüello García
- Pastor: Luis Arturo Vallejo Barona

The Church of St. Peter (Spanish: Iglesia de San Pedro) is a Catholic church located in the town of Valdunquillo, in the Province of Valladolid, Spain. The church was previously part of the monastic complex of the Convento de Nuestra Señora de la Merced Descalza, a priory of the Discalced Mercedarians, a mendicant Order of friars founded in the 15th century.

The priory was established in 1607 and closed by the Spanish government in the 19th century, as part of the suppression of religious communities by various governments. The monastic buildings were demolished after that. The church was originally dedicated to Nuestra Señora de la Encarnación (Our Lady of the Incarnation). After the expulsion of the friars, the former monastic church was converted into a parish church.

Made of brick, the church was built in the 18th century. The main retablo is from that period. The retablo is a copy of the painting of the Llanto por Cristo Muerto (Lament for the Dead Christ) by Antonio de Pereda; the original is in a Museum of Marseille.

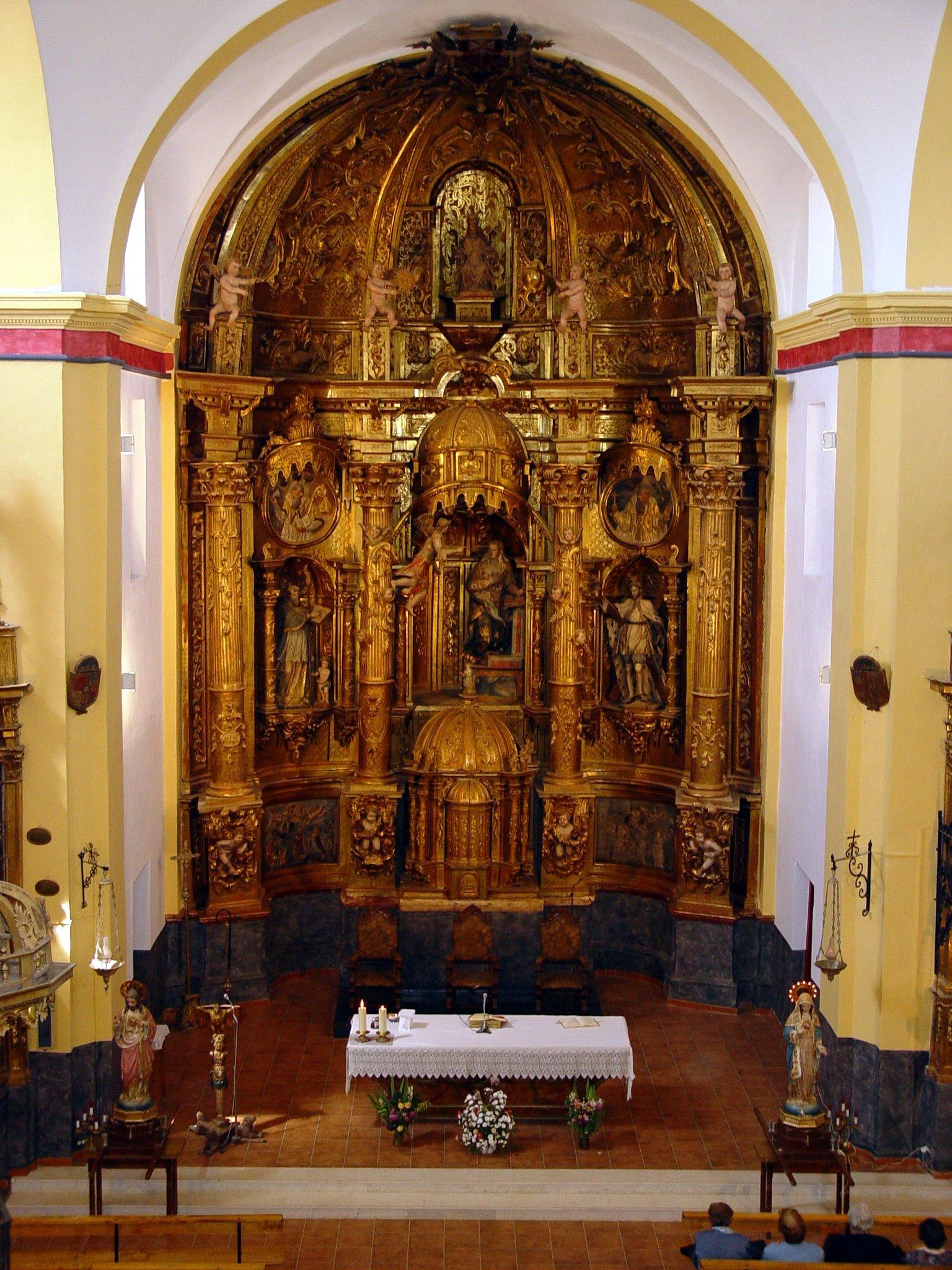
18th-century retablo

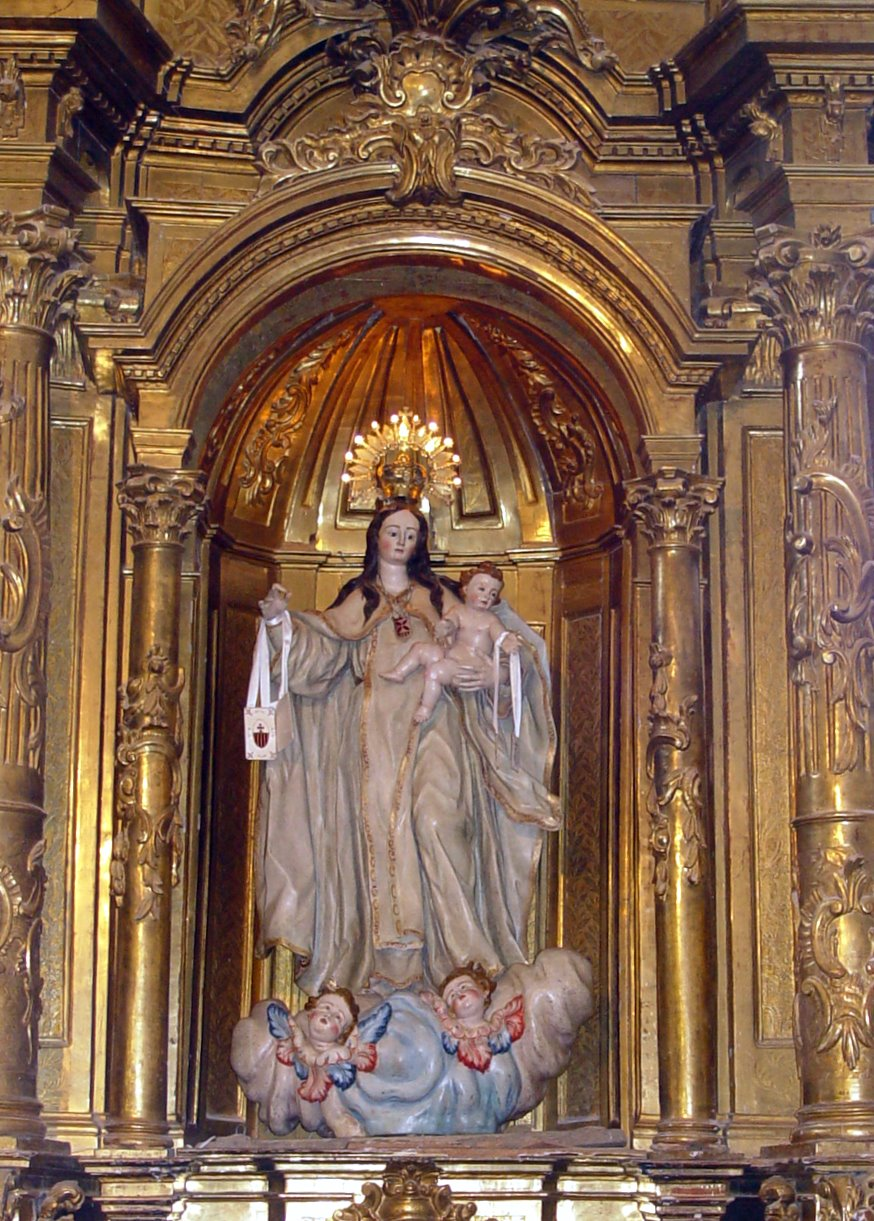
Our Lady of Mercy, patron saint of the Mercedarian Friars
