= La Merced, Burgos =

Historic church in Burgos, Spain

Coordinates: 42°20′18″N 3°42′14″W

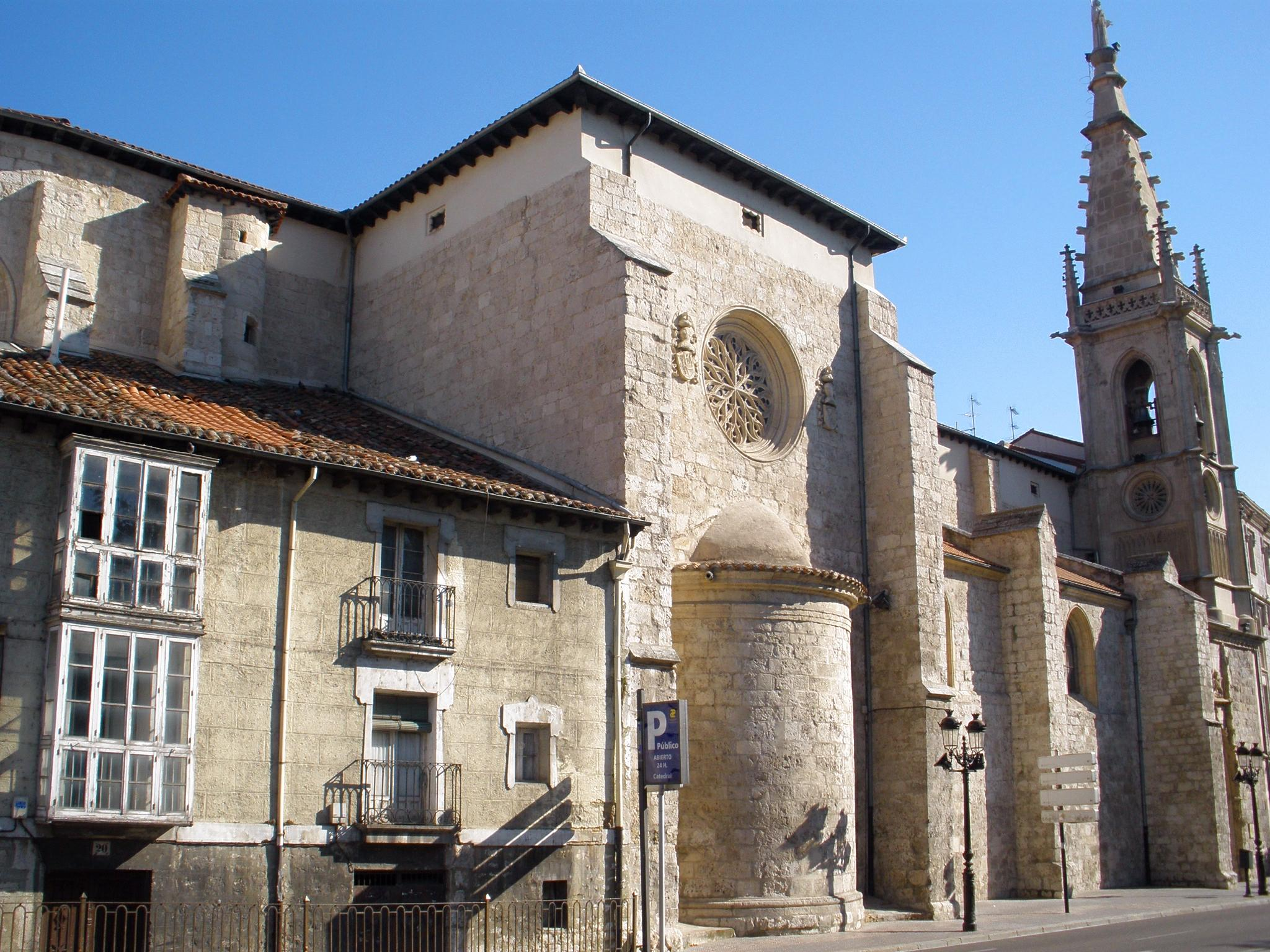
Iglesia de La Merced

Iglesia de La Merced is an historic Roman Catholic church in Burgos, Spain.

La Merced was built in the Gothic style from 1498 onwards under architect D. Pedro del Barrio Riaño, La Merced is still used as a parish church of the Jesuits. The old convent buildings – inhabited by Mercedarian friars for more than three centuries – are now used by a catering business.
