= 2016–17 Alba Fehérvár season =

2016–17 Alba Fehérvár
- Season: 2016–17
- Duration: October 6, 2016 - TBD
- TV partners: M4 Sport, FIBA Youtube

The 2016–17 Alba Fehérvár is the 68th season of the Alba Fehérvár in the highest tier professional basketball league, NB I/A in Hungary.

== Team ==
Note: Flags indicate national team eligibility at FIBA-sanctioned events. Players may hold other non-FIBA nationalities not displayed.

Alba Fehérvár roster
Players
Coaches

Pos.	No.	Nat.	Name	Ht.	Wt.	Age
SF	20	(United States)	Burgess, Bradford (injured)	1.98 m (6 ft 6 in)	102 kg (225 lb)	35 – 29 April 1990
PG	5	(United States)	Taylor, Brandon	1.80 m (5 ft 11 in)	80 kg (176 lb)	34 – 8 January 1992
C	6	(Hungary)	Keller, Ákos	2.08 m (6 ft 10 in)	104 kg (229 lb)	37 – 28 March 1989
SF	22	(Hungary)	Nshimba, Joel	2.00 m (6 ft 7 in)	86 kg (190 lb)	28 – 4 March 1998
C	15	(United States)	Farr, James	2.08 m (6 ft 10 in)	112 kg (247 lb)	33 – 2 November 1992
SF	10	(Hungary)	Markovic, Luka	1.98 m (6 ft 6 in)	98 kg (216 lb)	32 – 4 September 1993
PG	11	(Hungary)	Tóth, Péter (injured)	2.08 m (6 ft 10 in)	88 kg (194 lb)	38 – 4 March 1988
SF	12	(Hungary)	Keller, Iván	1.98 m (6 ft 6 in)	85 kg (187 lb)	31 – 8 March 1995
SG	14	(United States)	Edwards, Justin	1.90 m (6 ft 3 in)	90 kg (198 lb)	33 – 31 October 1992
PF	7	(United States)	Shepard, Winston	2.03 m (6 ft 8 in)	98 kg (216 lb)	32 – 22 September 1993
PF	44	(Hungary)	Lóránt, Péter (C)	2.06 m (6 ft 9 in)	105 kg (231 lb)	40 – 23 October 1985
SG	8	(Hungary)	Somogyfoki, Péter	1.87 m (6 ft 2 in)	80 kg (176 lb)	28 – 26 September 1997
SG	25	(Hungary)	Varga, Máté	1.89 m (6 ft 2 in)	75 kg (165 lb)	28 – 13 September 1997
PG	13	(United States)	Mohammed, Alhaji	1.93 m (6 ft 4 in)	88 kg (194 lb)	44 – 29 October 1981

Head coach

- (Serbia) Branislav Dzunic

Assistant coach(es)

- (Hungary) Góbi Henrik
- (Hungary) Blahó Barnabás

Legend

- (C) Team captain
- Injured

- Roster
Updated: April 27, 2017

=== Depth chart ===
Pos.	Starting 5	Bench 1	Bench 2
C	Ákos Keller	James Farr
PF	Péter Lóránt
SF	Winston Shepard	Luka Markovic
SG	Justin Edwards	Iván Keller	Máté Varga
PG	Brandon Taylor	Alhaji Mohammed

=== In ===
==== Players ====
- (Hungary) Ákos Keller from Szolnoki Olaj KK, Hungarian National Championship
- (United States) Bradford Burgess from Falco KC Szombathely, Hungarian National Championship
- (Hungary) Iván Keller from Kecskeméti TE, Hungarian National Championship
- (Hungary) Joel Nshimba from Vasas-Akadémia, Hungarian National Championship
- (United States) James Farr from Xavier Musketeers, NCAA
- (Canada) Justin Edwards from Kansas State Wildcats, NCAA
- (United States) Brandon Taylor from Utah Utes, NCAA Division I
- (United States) Winston Shepard from Golden State Warriors, NBA (Summer League)
- (United States) Alhaji Mohammed from BC Mures, Romanian Basketball League

=== Out ===
==== Players ====
- (Hungary) Balázs Simon retired (sports director)
- (United States) Kenny Chery to Real Betis Energía Plus, Liga ACB
- (Hungary) Milán Csorvási to Egis Körmend, Hungarian National Championship
- (Hungary) József Czirbus to Jászberényi KSE, Hungarian National Championship
- (United States) Anthony Myles to Soproni KC, Hungarian National Championship
- (United States) Ryan Pearson to Le Mans Sarthe Basket, LNB Pro A
- (United States) Tristan Spurlock to Asociacion Quimsa Santiago del Estero, Liga Nacional de Básquet
- (United States) Jerrel Wright to Zalakerámia-ZTE KK, Hungarian National Championship
- (Hungary) Zoltán Supola to PVSK Panthers, Hungarian National Championship
- (Hungary) Bence Fülöp to Kecskeméti TE, Hungarian National Championship
- (United States) Bradford Burgess (injured)

== Championship ==
The 2016–17 Nemzeti Bajnokság I/A is the 86th season of the Nemzeti Bajnokság I/A, the highest tier professional basketball league in Hungary.

=== Regular season ===
Round	Home	Away	Result
1	Zalakerámia ZTE KK	**Alba Fehérvár**	65-71
2	**Alba Fehérvár**	Falco KC Szombathely	77-72
3	MAFC	**Alba Fehérvárr**	70-81
4	**Sopron KC**	Alba Fehérvár	80-73
5	Jászberényi KSE	**Alba Fehérvár**	67-71
6	**Alba Fehérvár**	Atomerőmű SE	96-67
7	Kaposvári KK	**Alba Fehérvár**	72-88
8	**Alba Fehérvár**	Vasas Budapest	94-86
9	**Alba Fehérvár**	Szolnoki Olaj KK	85-79
10	Naturtex-SZTE-Szedeák	**Alba Fehérvár**	84-89
11	Alba Fehérvár	**Egis Körmend**	84-91
12	PVSK Pannonpower	**Alba Fehérvár**	70-77
13	**Alba Fehérvár**	KTE-Duna Aszfalt	90-59
14	**Alba Fehérvár**	Zalakerámia ZTE KK	90-81
15	**Falco KC Szombathely**	Alba Fehérvár	89-61
16	**Alba Fehérvár**	MAFC	101-75
17	**Alba Fehérvár**	Sopron KC	69-67
18	**Alba Fehérvár**	Jászberényi KSE	92-80
19	Atomerőmű SE	**Alba Fehérvár**	73-83
20	**Alba Fehérvár**	Kaposvári KK	94-67
21	Vasas Budapest	**Alba Fehérvár**	59-106
22	**Szolnoki Olaj KK**	Alba Fehérvár	90-76
23	**Alba Fehérvár**	Naturtex-SZTE-Szedeák	94-70
24	Egis Körmend	**Alba Fehérvár**	76-81
25	Alba Fehérvár	**PVSK Pannonpower**	67-85
26	KTE-Duna Aszfalt	**Alba Fehérvár**	65-88

Pos	Team	Pld	W	L	PF	PA	PD	Pts	Qualification
1	Alba Fehérvár	26	21	5	2178	1939	+239	47	1st – 5th Placement matches
2	Egis Körmend	26	18	8	2259	1987	+272	44	1st – 5th Placement matches
3	Szolnoki Olaj KK	26	17	9	2198	2030	+168	43	1st – 5th Placement matches
4	Falco-Vulcano KC Szombathely	26	17	9	2148	2026	+122	43	1st – 5th Placement matches
5	Zalakerámia ZTE KK	26	17	9	2244	2144	+100	43	1st – 5th Placement matches
6	Kaposvári KK	26	16	10	2072	2081	−9	42	6th – 10th Placement matches
7	PVSK-PANNONPOWER	26	15	11	2088	2055	+33	41	6th – 10th Placement matches
8	Naturtex-SZTE-Szedeák	26	13	13	2080	2044	+36	39	6th – 10th Placement matches
9	Sopron KC	26	12	14	2028	1973	+55	38	6th – 10th Placement matches
10	KTE-Duna Aszfalt	26	12	14	1951	2026	−75	38	6th – 10th Placement matches
11	Atomerőmű SE	26	9	17	2091	2202	−111	35	11th – 14th Placement matches
12	JP Auto - JKSE	26	7	19	2005	2191	−186	33	11th – 14th Placement matches
13	Vasas Budapest	26	4	22	2027	2369	−342	30	11th – 14th Placement matches
14	MAFC	26	4	22	1916	2218	−302	30	11th – 14th Placement matches

Updated to match(es) played on 26 March 2017. Source: Kosarsport.hu
Rules for classification: 1) Games played; 2) Points; 3) Wins; 4) Defeats; 5) Points for; 6) Points against; 7) Victories/Defeats series; 8) in Home games; 9) as a Guest; 10) Last 5 matches.

=== Mid-season ===
Round	Home	Away	Result
1	**Falco KC Szombathely**	Alba Fehérvár	69-62
2	Alba Fehérvár	Zalakerámia ZTE KK	89-90
3	**Alba Fehérvár**	Szolnoki Olaj KK	82-75
4	**Egis Körmend**	Alba Fehérvár	96-89
5	**Alba Fehérvár**	Falco KC Szombathely	93-80
6	**Zalakerámia ZTE KK**	Alba Fehérvár	88-76
7	**Szolnoki Olaj KK**	Alba Fehérvár	80-78
8	**Alba Fehérvár**	Egis Körmend	105-96

Pos	Team	Pld	W	L	PF	PA	PD	Pts	Qualification
1	Alba Fehérvár	34	24	10	2852	2613	+239	**58**	Playoffs
2	Falco-Vulcano KC Szombathely	34	22	12	2804	2674	+130	**56**	Playoffs
3	Egis Körmend	34	22	12	2980	2701	+279	**56**	Playoffs
4	Zalakerámia ZTE KK	34	22	12	2952	2831	+121	**56**	Playoffs
5	Szolnoki Olaj KK	34	20	14	2862	2730	+132	**54**	Playoffs

Updated to match(es) played on 6 May 2017. Source: Kosarsport.hu
Rules for classification: 1) Games played; 2) Points; 3) Wins; 4) Defeats; 5) Points for; 6) Points against; 7) Victories/Defeats series; 8) in Home games; 9) as a Guest; 10) Last 5 matches.

=== Playoffs ===
Teams in bold won the playoff series. Numbers to the left of each team indicate the team's original playoff seeding. Numbers to the right indicate the score of each playoff game.

Quarter-finals
1	**Alba Fehérvár**	**3**
8	KTE-Duna Aszfalt	0
4	**Zalakerámia ZTE KK**	**3**
5	Szolnoki Olaj KK	2
2	**Falco-Vulcano KC Szombathely**	**3**
7	Kaposvári KK	1
3	**Egis Körmend**	**3**
6	PVSK-PANNONPOWER	1

Semi-finals
1	**Alba Fehérvár**	**3**
4	Zalakerámia ZTE KK	1
2	**Falco-Vulcano KC Szombathely**	**3**
3	Egis Körmend	0

Finals
1	**Alba Fehérvár**	**3**
2	Falco-Vulcano KC Szombathely	1
Third place
3	Egis Körmend	0
4	**Zalakerámia ZTE KK**	**2**

Round	Game	Home	Away	Result
1	1	**Alba Fehérvár**	KTE-Duna Aszfalt	89-79
1	2	KTE-Duna Aszfalt	**Alba Fehérvár**	72-80
1	3	**Alba Fehérvár**	KTE-Duna Aszfalt	98-69
2	1	Alba Fehérvár	**Zalakerámia ZTE KK**	80-88
2	2	Zalakerámia ZTE KK	**Alba Fehérvár**	86-94
2	3	**Alba Fehérvár**	Zalakerámia ZTE KK	102-70
2	4	Zalakerámia ZTE KK	Alba Fehérvár	74-79
2	1	Alba Fehérvár	**Falco-Vulcano KC Szombathely**	76-77
2	2	Falco-Vulcano KC Szombathely	**Alba Fehérvár**	65-75
2	3	**Alba Fehérvár**	Falco-Vulcano KC Szombathely	86-77
2	4	**Falco-Vulcano KC Szombathely**	Alba Fehérvár	82-69
2	5	**Alba Fehérvár**	Falco-Vulcano KC Szombathely	78-71

== FIBA Europe Cup ==
The 2016–17 FIBA Europe Cup was the 2nd season of the FIBA Europe Cup, a European basketball club competition organised by FIBA Europe. The season began on 18 October 2016, with the regular season, and concluded on April 25, 2017, with the second leg of the Finals.

=== Regular season ===
Pos	Team	Pld	W	L	PF	PA	PD	Pts	Qualification
1	(France) Élan Chalon	6	4	2	520	492	+28	10	Advance to second round
2	(Hungary) Alba Fehérvár	6	4	2	518	493	+25	10	Advance to second round
3	(Portugal) Benfica	6	3	3	455	477	−22	9	Advance to second round
4	(Belgium) Basic-Fit Brussels	6	1	5	453	484	−31	7	

Source: FIBA Europe Cup

Round	Home	Away	Result
1	Alba Fehérvár	Basic-Fit Brussels	86-79
2	Alba Fehérvár	Elan Chalon	111-91
3	Alba Fehérvár	Benfica	90-71
4	Benfica	Alba Fehérvár	77-74
5	Elan Chalon	Alba Fehérvár	106-77
6	Basic-Fit Brussels	Alba Fehérvár	69-80

=== Second round ===
Pos	Team	Pld	W	L	PF	PA	PD	Pts	Qualification
1	(France) Pau-Lacq-Orthez	6	4	2	520	461	+59	10	Advance to play-offs
2	(Hungary) Alba Fehérvár	6	4	2	500	501	−1	10	
3	(Romania) U-BT Cluj-Napoca	6	2	4	475	491	−16	8	
4	(Czech Republic) JIP Pardubice	6	2	4	466	508	−42	8	

Source: FIBA Europe

Round	Home	Away	Result
1	Alba Fehérvár	U-BT Cluj-Napoca	92-83
2	Alba Fehérvár	BK JIP Pardubice	84-78
3	Pau-Lacq-Orthez	Alba Fehérvár	89-63
4	U-BT Cluj-Napoca	Alba Fehérvár	81-86
5	BK JIP Pardubice	Alba Fehérvár	89-97
6	Alba Fehérvár	Pau-Lacq-Orthez	78-81

== Hungarian Cup ==
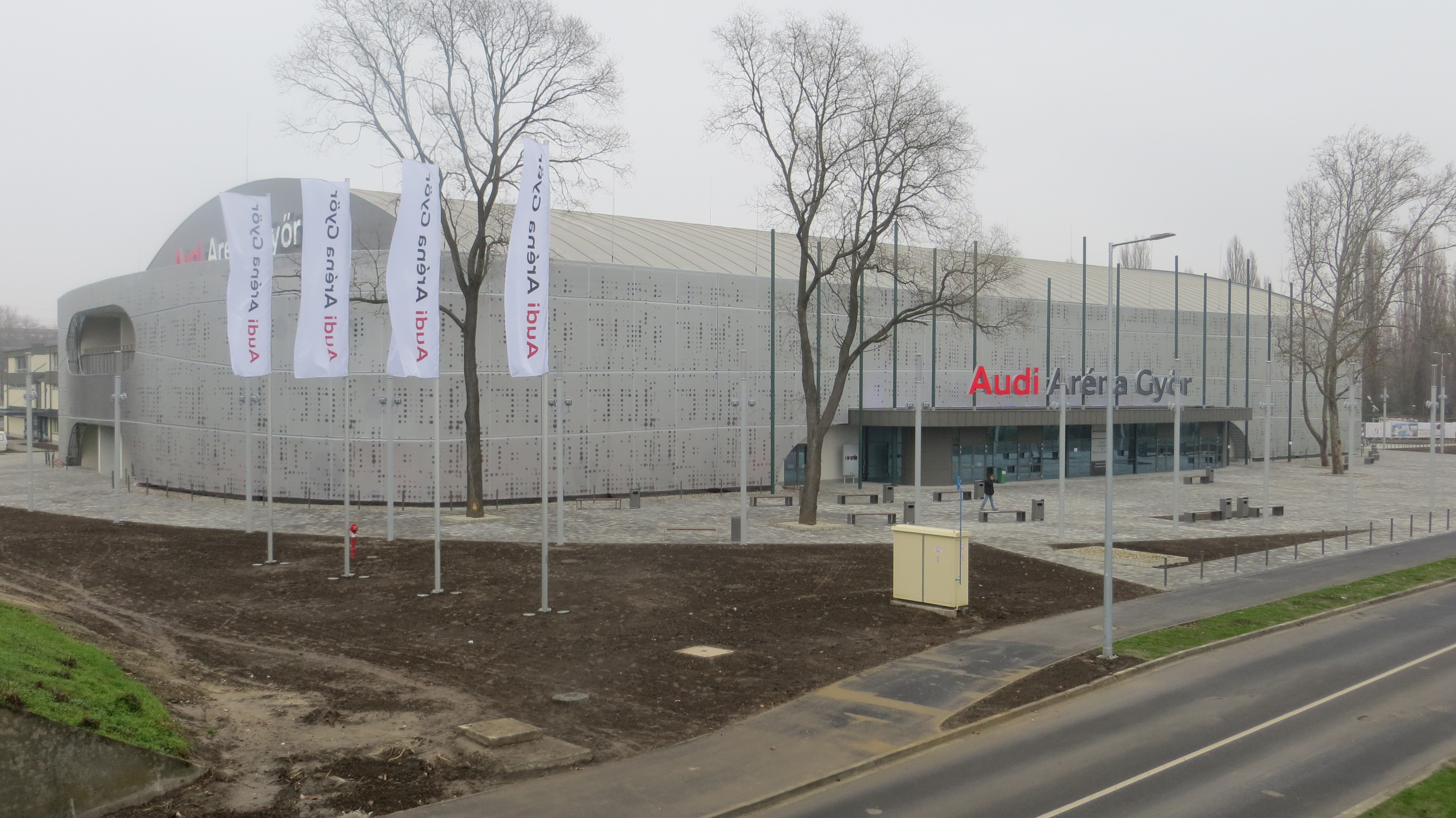
Audi Aréna hosted the tournament

Quarterfinals; February 16
Naturtex-SZTE-Szedeák	81
PVSK-PANNONPOWER	74
Szolnoki Olaj KK (OT)	93
Kaposvári KK	79
ZTE KK	73
Alba Fehérvár	98
Falco-V. Energia KC Szombathely	66
Egis Körmend	83

Semifinals; February 17
Naturtex-SZTE-Szedeák	58
Szolnoki Olaj KK	71
Alba Fehérvár	91
Egis Körmend	68

Final; February 18
Szolnoki Olaj KK	58
Alba Fehérvár	59

=== Quarterfinals ===
16 February 2017	ZTE KK	73–98	Alba Fehérvár	Győr
18:00 (CET)	Scoring by quarter: 23–22, 10–22, 23–31, 17–23
	Pts: Norfleet, Benke 14; Rebs: Benke 7 Asts: Ubilla 5 PIR: Benke, Wright 19	Boxscore	Pts: Edwards 16; Rebs: Lóránt, Shepard 7 Asts: Shepard, Edwards 7 PIR: Lóránt 28	Arena: Audi Aréna; Referees: Z. Pálla, P. Papp, J. Ádám, (Zs. Hartyáni)

=== Semifinals ===
17 February 2017	Alba Fehérvár	91–68	Egis Körmend	Győr
19:00 (CET)	Scoring by quarter: 25–22, 14–12, 26–19, 26–15
	Pts: Lóránt 16; Rebs: Edwards 8 Asts: Taylor 7 PIR: Lóránt 24	Boxscore	Pts: Petty 22; Rebs: Csorvási 7 Asts: Gibbs 5 PIR: Petty 25	Arena: Audi Aréna; Attendance: 2,000; Referees: T. Földházi, P. Frányó, T. Söjtöry, (J. Gincsai)

=== Final ===
18 February 2017 Final	Alba Fehérvár	59–58	Szolnoki Olaj KK	Győr
20:00 (CET)	Scoring by quarter: 14–18, 21–14, 13–14, 11–12
	Pts: Edwards, Shepard 12; Rebs: Lóránt 11; Asts: Edwards, Shepard 4 PIR: Lóránt 19	Boxscore	Pts: Pavličević 15; Rebs: Borisov 9 Asts: Vojvoda, Wittmann 2 PIR: Andrić 18	Arena: Audi Aréna; Attendance: 1,200; Referees: Cs. Cziffra, G. Kapitány, T. Benczur, (Zs. Várhalmi)

== Statistics ==
=== Championship ===
Num.	Player	Position	Phase	GP	MPG	FG%	3P%	FT%	RPG	APG	SPG	BPG	PPG
5	Brandon Taylor	PG	Regular Season	25	26.8	.535	.426	.831	2.4	4.7	1	0	12.3
5	Brandon Taylor	PG	Mid-Season	8	34.7	.407	.375	.944	3.6	6.3	1.1	0	11.6
5	Brandon Taylor	PG	Playoffs	3	22	.500	.429	1.000	3.3	4.3	3	0	14.3
6	Ákos Keller	C	Regular Season	26	24.5	.711	.400	.588	5.5	0.7	0.5	0.8	9
6	Ákos Keller	C	Mid-Season	8	25.8	.755	.400	.600	7.5	1.1	0.8	0.5	10
6	Ákos Keller	C	Playoffs	3	22	.642	.500	.375	2.3	1	0	1.3	8
7	Winston Shepard	SF	Regular Season	26	25.8	.523	.133	.615	5.8	2.6	0.5	0.3	10.7
7	Winston Shepard	SF	Mid-Season	5	26.8	.594	.214	.785	6.2	4.2	0.6	0	12.8
7	Winston Shepard	SF	Playoffs	3	35.6	.531	.000	.800	7.3	5.6	1.3	0.333	14
10	Luka Markovic	SF	Regular Season	21	19	.512	.354	.555	3.1	1.1	0.8	0.2	8.5
10	Luka Markovic	SF	Mid-Season	8	26	.581	.100	.714	4.9	1.4	1.3	0.3	8.9
10	Luka Markovic	SF	Playoffs	1	35.6	.500	.000	-	5	4	1	0	2
14	Justin Edwards	SG	Regular Season	23	25.9	.606	.333	.703	4	3.1	1.6	0.5	14.4
14	Justin Edwards	SG	Mid-Season	3	33	.409	.500	.916	4	2.3	1	0	15.6
14	Justin Edwards	SG	Playoffs	-	-	-	-	-	-	-	-	-	-
44	Péter Lóránt	PF	Regular Season	24	28.3	.555	.450	.909	6.3	3.2	1.3	0.3	13.8
44	Péter Lóránt	PF	Mid-Season	7	32.4	.655	.411	.861	9.4	2.7	0.4	0	18.9
44	Péter Lóránt	PF	Playoffs	3	31.6	.586	.375	.928	8.3	2	1	0.7	18.6
