= 2017 Magyar Kupa (men's basketball) =

2017 Zsíros Tibor Magyar Kupa
Tournament details
- Arena: Audi Aréna; Győr, Hungary
- Dates: 16–18 February 2017

Final positions
- Champions: Alba Fehérvár (4th title)
- Runners-up: Szolnoki Olaj KK
- Third place: Naturtex-SZTE-Szedeák
- Fourth place: Egis Körmend

Awards and statistics
- MVP: (Hungary) Péter Lóránt

The 2017 Tibor Zsíros Férfi Magyar Kupa was the 51st season of the Hungarian Basketball Cup. Alba Fehérvár won its 4th national Cup championship. Péter Lóránt was named Most Valuable Player.

== Qualification ==
Eight highest ranked teams after the first half of the 2016–17 NB I/A regular season qualified to the tournament.

1. Alba Fehérvár
2. Egis Körmend
3. ZTE KK
4. Falco-V. Energia KC Szombathely
5. PVSK-PANNONPOWER
6. Kaposvári KK
7. Szolnoki Olaj KK
8. Naturtex-SZTE-Szedeák

== Bracket ==
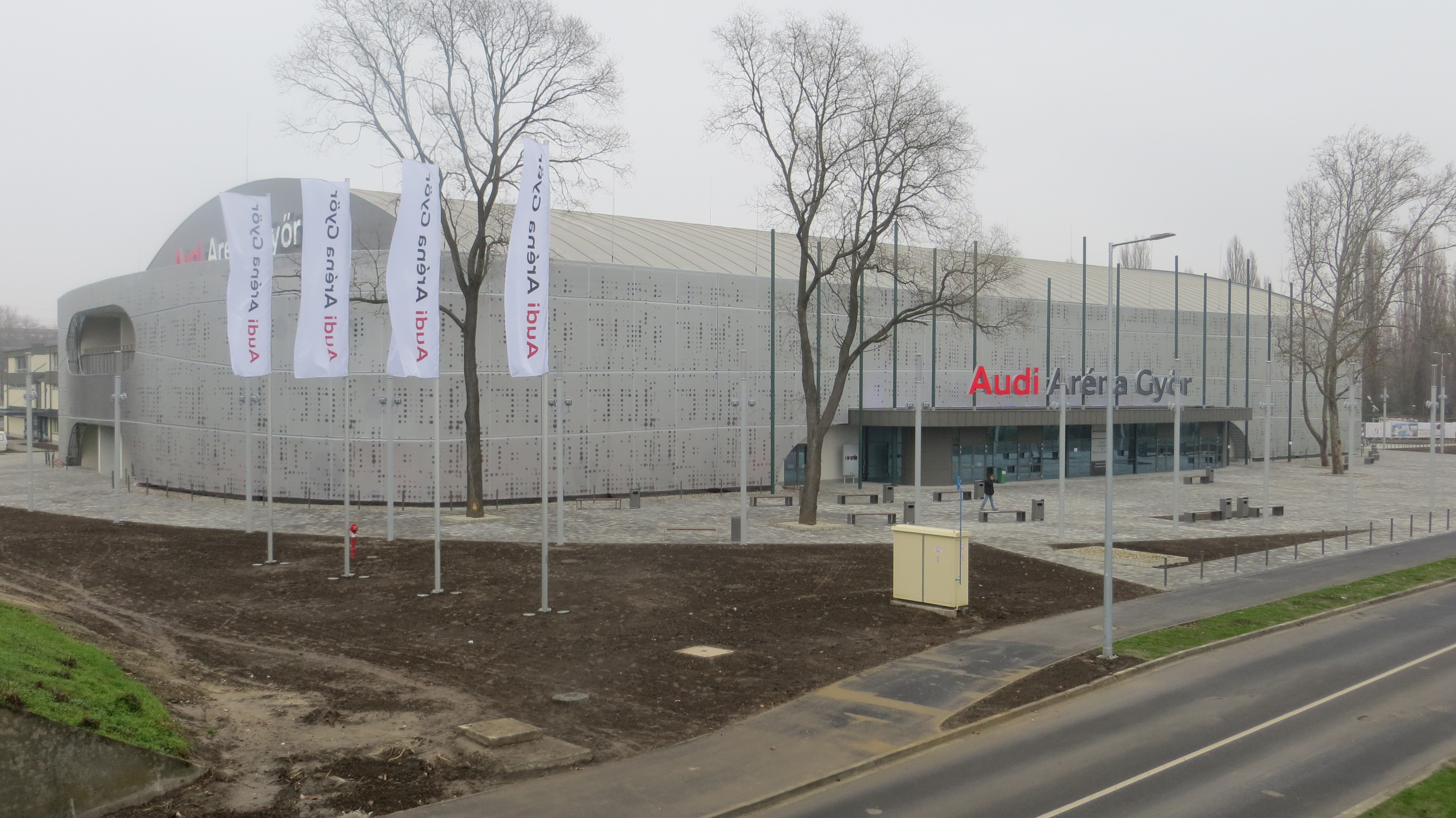
Audi Aréna hosted the tournament

Quarterfinals; February 16
Naturtex-SZTE-Szedeák	81
PVSK-PANNONPOWER	74
Szolnoki Olaj KK (OT)	93
Kaposvári KK	79
ZTE KK	73
Alba Fehérvár	98
Falco-V. Energia KC Szombathely	66
Egis Körmend	83

Semifinals; February 17
Naturtex-SZTE-Szedeák	58
Szolnoki Olaj KK	71
Alba Fehérvár	91
Egis Körmend	68

Final; February 18
Szolnoki Olaj KK	58
Alba Fehérvár	59

== Matches ==
=== Quarterfinals ===
16 February 2017	Naturtex-SZTE-Szedeák	81–74	PVSK-PANNONPOWER	Győr
13:00 (CET)	Scoring by quarter: 18–21, 15–16, 19–11, 29–26
	Pts: Lilov 26; Rebs: Boltić, Juhos 8 Asts: Boltić 7 PIR: Boltić 27	Boxscore	Pts: Smith 24; Rebs: Nelson 7 Asts: Budimir, Halász 4 PIR: Nelson 30	Arena: Audi Aréna; Referees: P. Győrffy, R. Török, G. Szabó, (L. Fekete)

16 February 2017	Szolnoki Olaj KK	93–79(OT)	Kaposvári KK	Győr
15:30 (CET)	Scoring by quarter: 23–18, 21–17, 21–26, 13–17, Overtime: 15–1
	Pts: Andrić 29; Rebs: Andrić 13; Asts: Vojvoda 7 PIR: Andrić 50	Boxscore	Pts: Frazier 19; Rebs: Cooke 10; Asts: Wisseh 10; PIR: Cooke 21	Arena: Audi Aréna; Referees: T. Földházi, T. Benczur, T. Hegedüs, (K. Páli)

16 February 2017	ZTE KK	73–98	Alba Fehérvár	Győr
18:00 (CET)	Scoring by quarter: 23–22, 10–22, 23–31, 17–23
	Pts: Norfleet, Benke 14; Rebs: Benke 7 Asts: Ubilla 5 PIR: Benke, Wright 19	Boxscore	Pts: Edwards 16; Rebs: Lóránt, Shepard 7 Asts: Shepard, Edwards 7 PIR: Lóránt 28	Arena: Audi Aréna; Referees: Z. Pálla, P. Papp, J. Ádám, (Zs. Hartyáni)

16 February 2017	Falco-V. Energia KC Szombathely	66–83	Egis Körmend	Győr
20:30 (CET)	Scoring by quarter: 8–17, 16–21, 21–19, 21–26
	Pts: Govens 23; Rebs: Govens 9 Asts: Govens 6 PIR: Govens 37	Boxscore	Pts: Smith 18; Rebs: Petty 11; Asts: Gibbs, Petty 5 PIR: Smith, Petty 25	Arena: Audi Aréna; Referees: Cs. Cziffra, G. Kapitány, G. Farkas, (L. Balogh)

=== Semifinals ===
17 February 2017	Naturtex-SZTE-Szedeák	58–71	Szolnoki Olaj KK	Győr
16:30 (CET)	Scoring by quarter: 18–27, 9–24, 22–5, 9–15
	Pts: Ćirić 17; Rebs: Juhos, Šulović 6 Asts: Boltić 6 PIR: Šulović 28	Boxscore	Pts: Vojvoda 20; Rebs: Eilingsfeld, Barnies 8 Asts: Vojvoda 4 PIR: Eilingsfeld 23	Arena: Audi Aréna; Attendance: 1,500; Referees: Z. Pálla, P. Papp, D. Tőzsér, (M. Faidt)

17 February 2017	Alba Fehérvár	91–68	Egis Körmend	Győr
19:00 (CET)	Scoring by quarter: 25–22, 14–12, 26–19, 26–15
	Pts: Lóránt 16; Rebs: Edwards 8 Asts: Taylor 7 PIR: Lóránt 24	Boxscore	Pts: Petty 22; Rebs: Csorvási 7 Asts: Gibbs 5 PIR: Petty 25	Arena: Audi Aréna; Attendance: 2,000; Referees: T. Földházi, P. Frányó, T. Söjtöry, (J. Gincsai)

=== Bronze medal match ===
18 February 2017 Bronze match	Egis Körmend	66–72	Naturtex-SZTE-Szedeák	Győr
17:30 (CET)	Scoring by quarter: 8–20, 22–15, 19–16, 17–21
	Pts: Petty 20; Rebs: Csorvási 11; Asts: Petty 6 PIR: Petty 29	Boxscore	Pts: Lilov 23; Rebs: Juhos 10; Asts: Šulović 6 PIR: Lilov 30	Arena: Audi Aréna; Attendance: 1,400; Referees: P. Györffy, L. Jakab, T. Boros, (I. Valovics)

=== Final ===
18 February 2017 Final	Alba Fehérvár	59–58	Szolnoki Olaj KK	Győr
20:00 (CET)	Scoring by quarter: 14–18, 21–14, 13–14, 11–12
	Pts: Edwards, Shepard 12; Rebs: Lóránt 11; Asts: Edwards, Shepard 4 PIR: Lóránt 19	Boxscore	Pts: Pavličević 15; Rebs: Borisov 9 Asts: Vojvoda, Wittmann 2 PIR: Andrić 18	Arena: Audi Aréna; Attendance: 1,200; Referees: Cs. Cziffra, G. Kapitány, T. Benczur, (Zs. Várhalmi)

Starters:			Pts	Reb	Ast
PG	5	(United States) Brandon Taylor	2	1	3
SG	14	(United States) Justin Edwards	12	8	4
SF	7	(United States) Winston Shepard	12	5	4
PF	44	(Hungary) Péter Lóránt	9	11	2
C	6	(Hungary) Ákos Keller	8	5	0
Reserves:					
SF	10	(Hungary) Luka Marković	0	0	0
PG	11	(Hungary) Péter Tóth	3	0	0
SF	12	(Hungary) Iván Keller	DNP		
C	15	(United States) James Farr	6	7	2
PF	20	(United States) Bradford Burgess	7	2	0
SF	22	(Democratic Republic of the Congo) Joel Nshimba	DNP		
SG	25	(Hungary) Máté Varga	DNP		
Head coach:
(Basketball Federation of Serbia) Branislav Dzunić

Alba Fehérvár	Szolnoki Olaj

Hungarian Cup MVP
Péter Lóránt
Game rules
Game played under FIBA rules.

2017 Magyar Kupa Winners
Alba Fehérvár
4th title

Starters:			Pts	Reb	Ast
PG	44	(Montenegro) Nikola Pavličević	15	5	1
SG	9	(Hungary) Dávid Vojvoda	5	6	2
SF	3	(United States) Troy Barnies	0	3	1
PF	7	(Hungary) János Eilingsfeld	2	5	0
C	4	(Croatia) Lukša Andrić	12	7	1
Reserves:					
C	6	(Hungary) Márton Hajdú	DNP		
G	8	(Hungary) Krisztián Wittmann	3	0	2
F	12	(Hungary) Gábor Rudner	DNP		
F	15	(Montenegro) Miloš Borisov	12	9	0
SF	25	(Montenegro) Aleksa Popović	9	4	1
SG	30	(Hungary) Bence Csák	DNP		
Head coach:
(Basketball Federation of Serbia) Zoran Kmezić

== See also ==
- 2016–17 Nemzeti Bajnokság I/A
