= 2016–17 Nemzeti Bajnokság I/A (men's basketball) =

Férfi NB I. A csoport
- Season: 2016–17
- Duration: October 6, 2016 – June 18, 2017
- Games played: 182 (regular season)
- Teams: 14
- TV partner: M4 Sport

Finals
- Champions: Alba Fehérvár (5th title)
- Runners-up: Falco-Vulcano Energia KC Szombathely
- Semifinalists: Zalakerámia ZTE KK; EGIS Körmend

Statistical leaders
| Points | (Bulgaria) Ivan Lilov | 20.19 |
| Rebounds | (United States) Matthew Tiby | 8.96 |
| Assists | (Puerto Rico) Emanuel Ubilla | 8.15 |
| Index Rating | (United States) Darrin Govens | 28.80 |

The 2016–17 Nemzeti Bajnokság I/A is the 86th season of the Nemzeti Bajnokság I/A, the highest tier professional basketball league in Hungary.

== Teams ==
Location of teams in 2016-17 Nemzeti Bajnokság I/A

The following 14 clubs compete in the NB I/A during the 2016–17 season. Vasas Akadémia promoted as champions of the Division B, the second tier.

| Team | Position 2015-16 | City | Arena | Capacity |
|---|---|---|---|---|
| Alba Fehérvár | Runner-up | Székesfehérvár | Vodafone Sportcentrum | 3,000 |
| Atomerőmű SE | 4th | Paks | ASE Sportcsarnok | 1,520 |
| Falco KC | 9th | Szombathely | Arena Savaria | 3,500 |
| Jászberényi KSE | 12th | Jászberény | Belvárosi Általános Iskola | 1,000 |
| Kaposvári KK | 7th | Kaposvár | Városi Sportcsarnok | 1,500 |
| Kecskeméti TE | 10th | Kecskemét | Messzi István Sportcsarnok | 1,600 |
| BC Körmend | Third place | Körmend | Városi Sportcsarnok | 1,740 |
| MAFC | 13th | Budapest | Gabányi László Sportcsarnok | 700 |
| PVSK-Panthers | 8th | Pécs | Lauber Dezső Sportcsarnok | 3,700 |
| Soproni KC | 6th | Sopron | NOVOMATIC Aréna | 2,500 |
| SZTE-Szedeák | 11th | Szeged | Újszegedi Sportcsarnok | 3,000 |
| Szolnoki Olaj KK | Champion | Szolnok | Tiszaligeti Sportcsarnok | 2,551 |
| Vasas SC | 1st (NB I/B) | Budapest | Sport11 Csarnok | 1,000 |
| Zalaegerszegi TE | 5th | Zalaegerszeg | Városi Sportcsarnok | 2,000 |

=== Personnel and kits ===
| Team | Head coach | Team captain | Kit manufacturer | Shirt sponsor |
|---|---|---|---|---|
| Alba Fehérvár | (Serbia) Branislav Džunić | (Hungary) Péter Lóránt | Spalding | tippmixPro^{1}, Hungrana |
| Atomerőmű SE | (Croatia) Teo Čizmić | (Hungary) Máté Medve | adidas | tippmixPro^{1}, MVM Atomerőmű |
| Falco KC Szombathely | (Serbia) Srećko Sekulović | (Hungary) Norbert Tóth | Zeus | tippmixPro^{1}, Autófókusz |
| Jászberényi KSE | (Austria) Stevan Tot | (Hungary) György Cseh | Spalding | TOP COP |
| Kaposvári KK | (Hungary) Ádám Fekete | (Hungary) Roland Hendlein | Spalding | tippmixPro^{1}, |
| Kecskeméti TE | (Hungary) Gábor Forray | (Hungary) Gergely Hegedűs | Kipsta | Duna Aszfalt, UltraTech |
| BC Körmend | (Slovenia) Gasper Potocnik | (Hungary) Csaba Ferencz | Nike | tippmixPro^{1}, EGIS |
| MAFC | (Hungary) Péter Garai | (Hungary) | Spalding | tippmixPro^{1} |
| PVSK-Panthers | (Hungary) Ferenc Csirke | (Croatia) Veljko Budimir | Spalding | tippmixPro^{1}, GP Consulting |
| Soproni KC | (Serbia) Dragan Aleksić | | Peak | tippmixPro^{1} |
| SZTE-Szedeák | (Serbia) Nikola Lazić | (Serbia) Andrija Ćirić | Toti Sport | tippmixPro^{1}, Naturtex, Continental |
| Szolnoki Olaj | (Serbia) (Hungary) Zoran Kmezić | (Hungary) Dávid Vojvoda | Spalding | Strabag |
| Vasas Budapest | (Hungary) Bulcsú Sárosi | (Hungary) Ákos Horváth | Toti Sport | Car-Net, Eurorisk |
| Zalaegerszeg | (Hungary) Tamás Bencze | (Hungary) Máté Mohácsi | adidas | Zalakerámia, tippmixPro^{1}, HunGast |

==== Managerial changes ====
| Team | Outgoing manager | Manner of departure | Date of vacancy | Position in table | Replaced by | Date of appointment |
|---|---|---|---|---|---|---|
| Egis Körmend | (Croatia) Teo Čizmić | Resigned | 10 December 2016 | 2nd | (Slovenia) Gasper Potocnik | 12 December 2016 |
| Sopron KC | (Hungary) Balázs Sabáli | Resigned | 7 January 2017 | 10th | (Serbia) Dragan Aleksić | 8 January 2017 |
| Szolnoki Olaj KK | (Croatia) (Hungary) Stojan Ivković | Resigned | 7 January 2017 | 7th | (Serbia) (Hungary) Zoran Kmezić | 10 January 2017 |
| Atomerőmű SE | (Lithuania) Gediminas Petrauskas | Mutual consent | 7 January 2017 | 12th | (Croatia) Teo Čizmić | 10 January 2017 |

== Regular season ==
| Pos | Team | Pld | W | L | PF | PA | PD | Pts | Qualification |
|---|---|---|---|---|---|---|---|---|---|
| 1 | Alba Fehérvár | 26 | 21 | 5 | 2178 | 1939 | +239 | 47 | 1st – 5th Placement matches |
| 2 | Egis Körmend | 26 | 18 | 8 | 2259 | 1987 | +272 | 44 | 1st – 5th Placement matches |
| 3 | Szolnoki Olaj KK | 26 | 17 | 9 | 2198 | 2030 | +168 | 43 | 1st – 5th Placement matches |
| 4 | Falco-Vulcano KC Szombathely | 26 | 17 | 9 | 2148 | 2026 | +122 | 43 | 1st – 5th Placement matches |
| 5 | Zalakerámia ZTE KK | 26 | 17 | 9 | 2244 | 2144 | +100 | 43 | 1st – 5th Placement matches |
| 6 | Kaposvári KK | 26 | 16 | 10 | 2072 | 2081 | −9 | 42 | 6th – 10th Placement matches |
| 7 | PVSK-PANNONPOWER | 26 | 15 | 11 | 2088 | 2055 | +33 | 41 | 6th – 10th Placement matches |
| 8 | Naturtex-SZTE-Szedeák | 26 | 13 | 13 | 2080 | 2044 | +36 | 39 | 6th – 10th Placement matches |
| 9 | Sopron KC | 26 | 12 | 14 | 2028 | 1973 | +55 | 38 | 6th – 10th Placement matches |
| 10 | KTE-Duna Aszfalt | 26 | 12 | 14 | 1951 | 2026 | −75 | 38 | 6th – 10th Placement matches |
| 11 | Atomerőmű SE | 26 | 9 | 17 | 2091 | 2202 | −111 | 35 | 11th – 14th Placement matches |
| 12 | JP Auto - JKSE | 26 | 7 | 19 | 2005 | 2191 | −186 | 33 | 11th – 14th Placement matches |
| 13 | Vasas Budapest | 26 | 4 | 22 | 2027 | 2369 | −342 | 30 | 11th – 14th Placement matches |
| 14 | MAFC | 26 | 4 | 22 | 1916 | 2218 | −302 | 30 | 11th – 14th Placement matches |

Updated to match(es) played on 26 March 2017. Source: Kosarsport.hu
Rules for classification: 1) Games played; 2) Points; 3) Wins; 4) Defeats; 5) Points for; 6) Points against; 7) Victories/Defeats series; 8) in Home games; 9) as a Guest; 10) Last 5 matches.

=== Results ===
| Home \ Away | ALBA | ASE | FAL | JKSE | KAP | KTE | KÖR | MAFC | PVSK | SOP | SZOL | SZTE | VAS | ZTE |
|---|---|---|---|---|---|---|---|---|---|---|---|---|---|---|
| Alba Fehérvár | | 96–67 | 77–72 | 92–80 | 94–67 | 90–59 | 84–91 | 101–75 | 67–85 | 69–67 | 85–79 | 94–70 | 94–86 | 90–81 |
| Atomerőmű SE | 73–83 | | 82–59 | 69–77 | 78–82 | 71–72 | 95–84 | 94–86 | 77–86 | 72–78 | 82–73 | 79–72 | 98–77 | 90–97 |
| Falco KC Szombathely | 89–61 | 113–81 | | 84–64 | 107–80 | 75–73 | 85–69 | 88–73 | 85–73 | 79–75 | 87–79 | 74–69 | 88–80 | 86–73 |
| JP Auto-JKSE | 67–71 | 102–89 | 66–83 | | 90–94 | 73–88 | 95–88 | 79–63 | 83–87 | 66–84 | 74–82 | 74–79 | 97–77 | 84–93 |
| Kaposvári KK | 72–88 | 78–72 | 94–75 | 79–73 | | 80–73 | 77–66 | 97–70 | 63–55 | 82–71 | 83–72 | 89–94 | 94–82 | 75–84 |
| KTE-Duna Aszfalt | 65–88 | 80–68 | 73–87 | 91–83 | 71–79 | | 78–75 | 77–69 | 79–85 | 90–84 | 76–63 | 82–61 | 82–75 | 62–68 |
| Egis Körmend | 76–81 | 102–64 | 92–81 | 98–66 | 83–72 | 90–65 | | 111–83 | 85–75 | 96–73 | 103–82 | 100–67 | 112–64 | 94–76 |
| MAFC | 70–81 | 68–81 | 75–67 | 58–60 | 71–72 | 81–92 | 80–85 | | 58–92 | 87–77 | 82–73 | 67–85 | 77–83 | 88–83 |
| PVSK-PANNONPOWER | 70–77 | 87–91 | 88–82 | 80–76 | 85–65 | 77–69 | 94–75 | 84–69 | | 92–77 | 73–95 | 82–75 | 79–66 | 97–89 |
| Sopron KC | 80–73 | 80–77 | 76–79 | 99–62 | 83–73 | 71–55 | 56–61 | 90–57 | 81–71 | | 74–95 | 62–54 | 95–71 | 74–77 |
| Szolnoki Olaj KK | 90–76 | 105–87 | 88–78 | 77–69 | 80–65 | 88–61 | 72–60 | 93–77 | 86–71 | 85–78 | | 70–66 | 107–68 | 85–91 |
| Naturtex-SZTE-Szedeák | 84–89 | 84–70 | 95–79 | 92–86 | 94–76 | 86–77 | 58–66 | 94–67 | 101–62 | 88–86 | 98–97 | | 92–70 | 73–86 |
| Vasas Budapest | 59–106 | 82–89 | 80–84 | 75–84 | 82–89 | 74–81 | 79–109 | 93–85 | 90–80 | 83–87 | 88–96 | 75–71 | | 87–96 |
| Zalakerámia ZTE KK | 65–71 | 99–95 | 90–82 | 119–75 | 88–95 | 85–80 | 85–88 | 86–80 | 94–78 | 79–70 | 78–86 | 85–78 | 97–81 | |

Legend: Blue = home team win; Yellow = draw; Red = away team win.

== Second round ==
=== 1st – 5th placement matches ===
| Pos | Team | Pld | W | L | PF | PA | PD | Pts | Qualification |
|---|---|---|---|---|---|---|---|---|---|
| 1 | Alba Fehérvár | 34 | 24 | 10 | 2852 | 2613 | +239 | 58 | Playoffs |
| 2 | Falco-Vulcano KC Szombathely | 34 | 22 | 12 | 2804 | 2674 | +130 | 56 | Playoffs |
| 3 | Egis Körmend | 34 | 22 | 12 | 2980 | 2701 | +279 | 56 | Playoffs |
| 4 | Zalakerámia ZTE KK | 34 | 22 | 12 | 2952 | 2831 | +121 | 56 | Playoffs |
| 5 | Szolnoki Olaj KK | 34 | 20 | 14 | 2862 | 2730 | +132 | 54 | Playoffs |

Updated to match(es) played on 6 May 2017. Source: Kosarsport.hu
Rules for classification: 1) Games played; 2) Points; 3) Wins; 4) Defeats; 5) Points for; 6) Points against; 7) Victories/Defeats series; 8) in Home games; 9) as a Guest; 10) Last 5 matches.

==== Results ====
| Home \ Away | ALBA | FAL | KÖR | SZOL | ZTE |
|---|---|---|---|---|---|
| Alba Fehérvár | | 93–80 | 105–96 | 82–75 | 89–90 |
| Falco KC Szombathely | 69–62 | | 92–80 | 77–71 | 88–80 |
| Egis Körmend | 96–89 | 102–86 | | 109–81 | 86–81 |
| Szolnoki Olaj KK | 80–78 | 92–84 | 78–71 | | 98–102 |
| Zalakerámia ZTE KK | 88–76 | 68–80 | 102–81 | 97–89 | |

Legend: Blue = home team win; Yellow = draw; Red = away team win.

=== 6th – 10th placement matches ===
| Pos | Team | Pld | W | L | PF | PA | PD | Pts | Qualification |
|---|---|---|---|---|---|---|---|---|---|
| 6 | PVSK-PANNONPOWER | 34 | 20 | 14 | 2761 | 2719 | +42 | 54 | Playoffs |
| 7 | Kaposvári KK | 34 | 19 | 15 | 2680 | 2719 | −39 | 53 | Playoffs |
| 8 | KTE-Duna Aszfalt | 34 | 18 | 16 | 2582 | 2622 | −40 | 52 | Playoffs |
| 9 | Naturtex-SZTE-Szedeák | 34 | 18 | 16 | 2688 | 2641 | +47 | 52 | |
| 10 | Sopron KC | 34 | 13 | 21 | 2657 | 2627 | +30 | 47 | |

Updated to match(es) played on 6 May 2017. Source: Kosarsport.hu
Rules for classification: 1) Games played; 2) Points; 3) Wins; 4) Defeats; 5) Points for; 6) Points against; 7) Victories/Defeats series; 8) in Home games; 9) as a Guest; 10) Last 5 matches.

==== Results ====
| Home \ Away | KAP | KTE | PVSK | SOP | SZTE |
|---|---|---|---|---|---|
| Kaposvári KK | | 66–73 | 91–76 | 84–80 | 70–66 |
| KTE-Duna Aszfalt | 94–74 | | 88–84 | 88–86 | 76–78 |
| PVSK-PANNONPOWER | 83–75 | 71–70 | | 103–94 | 93–61 |
| Sopron KC | 78–71 | 68–71 | 86–90 | | 63–69 |
| Naturtex-SZTE-Szedeák | 88–77 | 69–71 | 99–73 | 78–74 | |

Legend: Blue = home team win; Yellow = draw; Red = away team win.

=== 11th – 14th placement matches ===
| Pos | Team | Pld | W | L | PF | PA | PD | Pts | Qualification |
|---|---|---|---|---|---|---|---|---|---|
| 11 | Atomerőmű SE | 32 | 13 | 19 | 2559 | 2649 | −90 | 45 | |
| 12 | JP Auto - JKSE | 32 | 11 | 21 | 2490 | 2655 | −165 | 43 | |
| 13 | Vasas Budapest | 32 | 7 | 25 | 2525 | 2840 | −315 | 39 | Play-out |
| 14 | MAFC | 32 | 5 | 27 | 2352 | 2723 | −371 | 37 | Play-out |

Updated to match(es) played on 6 May 2017. Source: Kosarsport.hu
Rules for classification: 1) Games played; 2) Points; 3) Wins; 4) Defeats; 5) Points for; 6) Points against; 7) Victories/Defeats series; 8) in Home games; 9) as a Guest; 10) Last 5 matches.

==== Results ====
| Home \ Away | ASE | JKSE | MAFC | VAS |
|---|---|---|---|---|
| Atomerőmű SE | | 64–75 | 95–79 | 70–59 |
| JP Auto-JKSE | 80–75 | | 90–74 | 82–101 |
| MAFC | 67–74 | 66–79 | | 84–82 |
| Vasas Budapest | 87–90 | 84–79 | 85–66 | |

Legend: Blue = home team win; Yellow = draw; Red = away team win.

== Playoffs ==
Teams in bold won the playoff series. Numbers to the left of each team indicate the team's original playoff seeding. Numbers to the right indicate the score of each playoff game.

Quarter-finals
1 | **Alba Fehérvár** | **3**
8 | KTE-Duna Aszfalt | 0
4 | **Zalakerámia ZTE KK** | **3**
5 | Szolnoki Olaj KK | 2
2 | **Falco-Vulcano KC Szombathely** | **3**
7 | Kaposvári KK | 1
3 | **Egis Körmend** | **3**
6 | PVSK-PANNONPOWER | 1

Semi-finals
1 | **Alba Fehérvár** | **3**
4 | Zalakerámia ZTE KK | 1
2 | **Falco-Vulcano KC Szombathely** | **3**
3 | Egis Körmend | 0

Finals
1 | **Alba Fehérvár** | **3**
2 | Falco-Vulcano KC Szombathely | 2
Third place
3 | Egis Körmend | 0
4 | **Zalakerámia ZTE KK** | **2**

=== Quarter-finals ===
In the quarterfinals, teams playing against each other had to win three games to win the series. Thus, if one team wins three games before all five games have been played, the games that remain are omitted. The team that finished in the higher regular season place, played the first, third and the fifth (if it was necessary) games of the series at home.

| Team 1 | Agg. | Team 2 | Game 1 | Game 2 | Game 3 | Game 4 | Game 5 |
|---|---|---|---|---|---|---|---|
| **Alba Fehérvár** | 3–0 | KTE-Duna Aszfalt | 89–79 | 80–72 | 98–69 | — | — |
| **Falco-Vulcano Energia KC Szombathely** | 3–1 | Kaposvári KK | 82–72 | 71–78 | 78–76 | 84–77 | — |
| **EGIS Körmend** | 3–1 | PVSK-PANNONPOWER | 81–95 | 88–82 | 87–75 | 103–89 | — |
| **Zalakerámia ZTE KK** | 3–2 | Szolnoki Olaj KK | 79–76 | 77–94 | 85–68 | 75–83 | 85–69 |

=== Semi-finals ===
In the semifinals, teams playing against each other had to win three games to win the series. Thus, if one team wins three games before all five games have been played, the games that remain are omitted. The team that finished in the higher regular season place, played the first, third and the fifth (if it was necessary) games of the series at home.

| Team 1 | Agg. | Team 2 | Game 1 | Game 2 | Game 3 | Game 4 | Game 5 |
|---|---|---|---|---|---|---|---|
| **Alba Fehérvár** | 3–1 | Zalakerámia ZTE KK | 80–88 | 94–85 | 102–70 | 79–74 | — |
| **Falco-Vulcano Energia KC Szombathely** | 3–0 | EGIS Körmend | 89–88 | 81–78 | 88–84 | — | — |

=== Finals ===
In the finals, teams playing against each other had to win three games to win the title. Thus, if one team won three games before all five games were played, the remaining games were omitted. The team that finished in the higher regular season place, played the first, the third, and the fifth (if it was necessary) games of the series at home.

| Team 1 | Agg. | Team 2 | Game 1 | Game 2 | Game 3 | Game 4 | Game 5 |
|---|---|---|---|---|---|---|---|
| **Alba Fehérvár** | 3–2 | Falco-Vulcano Energia KC Szombathely | 76–77 | 75–65 | 86–77 | 69–82 | 78–71 |

==== Game 1 ====
| 7 June 2017 | Alba Fehérvár | 76–**77** (Series: **0–1**) | **Falco-Vulcano Energia KC Szombathely** | Székesfehérvár |
| 19:00 (CEST) | Scoring by quarter: 18–**19**, **26**–24, 15–**18**, **17**–16 |
| | Pts: Mohammed, Edwards 18; Rebs: Lóránt 9 Asts: Taylor 4 PIR: Lóránt 20 | Report | Pts: Govens 25; Rebs: Barham 9 Asts: Govens 7 PIR: Govens 24 | Arena: Alba Regia Sportcsarnok; Attendance: 2,500; Referees: G. Kapitány, T. Benczur, T. Söjtöry, (K. Páli) |

==== Game 2 ====
| 10 June 2017 | Falco-Vulcano Energia KC Szombathely | 65–**75** (Series: **1–1**) | **Alba Fehérvár** | Szombathely |
| 14:45 (CEST) | Scoring by quarter: 18–**21**, **17**–14, 14–14, 16–**26** |
| | Pts: Govens 16; Rebs: Govens, Žigeranović 8 Asts: Govens 6 PIR: Govens, Žigeranović 15 | Report | Pts: Taylor 16; Rebs: Shepard, Lóránt, Edwards 7 Asts: Shepard 5 PIR: Shepard 27 | Arena: Arena Savaria; Attendance: 3,000; Referees: T. Földházi, P. Papp, R. Török, (M. Faidt) |

==== Game 3 ====
| 13 June 2017 | **Alba Fehérvár** | **86**–77 (Series: **2–1**) | Falco-Vulcano Energia KC Szombathely | Székesfehérvár |
| 19:30 (CEST) | Scoring by quarter: 15–**26**, **22**–10, **26**–22, **23**–19 |
| | Pts: Lóránt 19; Rebs: Shepard, Keller 7 Asts: Taylor 6 PIR: Keller 27 | Report | Pts: Govens 26; Rebs: Kovács 8 Asts: Govens 7 PIR: Govens 36 | Arena: Alba Regia Sportcsarnok; Attendance: 2,500; Referees: Cs. Cziffra, P. Györffy, G. Farkas, (I. Bodrogváry) |

==== Game 4 ====
| 16 June 2017 | **Falco-Vulcano Energia KC Szombathely** | **82**–69 (Series: **2–2**) | Alba Fehérvár | Szombathely |
| 18:00 (CEST) | Scoring by quarter: **23**–14, **17**–16, **19**–17, **23**–22 |
| | Pts: Váradi 18; Rebs: Govens 9 Asts: Govens 5 PIR: Váradi 24 | Report | Pts: Shepard 14; Rebs: Edwards 8 Asts: Mohammed 5 PIR: Shepard 20 | Arena: Arena Savaria; Attendance: 3,000; Referees: T. Benczur, P. Győrffy, T. Söjtöry, (J. Gincsai) |

==== Game 5 ====
| 18 June 2017 | **Alba Fehérvár** | **78**–71 (Series: **3–2**) | Falco-Vulcano Energia KC Szombathely | Székesfehérvár |
| 21:00 (CEST) | Scoring by quarter: **14**–8, **25**–16, **23**–20, 16–**27** |
| | Pts: Shepard 18; Rebs: Keller 14; Asts: Edwards, Mohammed 3 PIR: Shepard 23 | Report | Pts: Govens 20; Rebs: Tóth 8 Asts: Govens 8 PIR: Govens 24 | Arena: Alba Regia Sportcsarnok; Attendance: 3,000; Referees: T. Földházi, Cs. Cziffra, P. Papp, (Zs. Hartyáni) |

Alba Fehérvár won the FINAL series.

2016–17 Nemzeti Bajnokság I/A
Champion

**5th title**

=== Third place ===
In the series for the third place, teams playing against each other had to win two games to win the 3rd place in the final rankings of the season. Thus, if one team won two games before all three games had been played, the remaining games were omitted. The team that finished in the higher regular season place, played the first and the third (if it was necessary) games of the series at home.

| Team 1 | Agg. | Team 2 | Game 1 | Game 2 | Game 3 |
|---|---|---|---|---|---|
| EGIS Körmend | 0–2 | **Zalakerámia ZTE KK** | 94–107 | 95–99 | — |

== Playout ==
Higher ranked team hosted Game 1 plus Game 3 if necessary. The lower ranked hosted Game 2.

| Team 1 | Agg. | Team 2 | Game 1 | Game 2 | Game 3 |
|---|---|---|---|---|---|
| Vasas Budapest | 2–1 | MAFC | 79–73 | 68–81 | 84–78 |

== Season statistics ==
=== Individual statistics ===
As of 18 June 2017.

==== Points ====
| Rank | Name | Team | PPG |
|---|---|---|---|
| 1. | (Bulgaria) Ivan Lilov | Naturtex-SZTE-Szedeák | 20.19 |
| 2. | (United States) Darrin Govens | Falco-Vulcano KC Szombathely | 20.08 |
| 3. | (United States) Andrew Pacher | Vasas Budapest | 18.16 |
| 4. | (Hungary) Dávid Vojvoda | Szolnoki Olaj KK | 18.08 |
| 5. | (Serbia) Marko Đerasimović | KTE-Duna Aszfalt | 17.48 |

==== Rebounds ====
| Rank | Name | Team | RPG |
|---|---|---|---|
| 1. | (United States) Matthew Tiby | Atomerőmű SE | 8.96 |
| 2. | (Hungary) Roland Hendlein | Kaposvári KK | 8.79 |
| 3. | (Hungary) Zsolt Szabó | Zalakerámia ZTE KK | 8.27 |
| 4. | (Bosnia and Herzegovina) Ismet Sejfić | PVSK-PANNONPOWER | 8.00 |
| 5. | (United States) Andrew Pacher | Vasas Budapest | 7.88 |

==== Valuation ====
| Rank | Name | Team | VPG |
|---|---|---|---|
| 1. | (United States) Darrin Govens | Falco-Vulcano KC Szombathely | 27.48 |
| 2. | (Puerto Rico) Emmanuel Ubilla | Zalakerámia ZTE KK | 25.61 |
| 3. | (United States) Andrew Pacher | Vasas Budapest | 24.52 |
| 4. | (Serbia) Marko Boltić | Naturtex-SZTE-Szedeák | 24.15 |
| 5. | (Serbia) Nenad Šulović | Naturtex-SZTE-Szedeák | 23.08 |

==== Assists ====
| Rank | Name | Team | APG |
|---|---|---|---|
| 1. | (Puerto Rico) Emmanuel Ubilla | Zalakerámia ZTE KK | 8.15 |
| 2. | (Serbia) Marko Boltić | Naturtex-SZTE-Szedeák | 8.00 |
| 3. | (United States) Ronald Taylor | Vasas Budapest | 7.48 |
| 4. | (United States) Anthony Nelson | PVSK-PANNONPOWER | 6.35 |
| 5. | (United States) Parish Petty | EGIS Körmend | 6.22 |

=== Number of teams by counties ===
| Pos. | County (megye) | No. of teams | Teams |
|---|---|---|---|
| 1 | Budapest (capital) | 2 | MAFC and Vasas |
| 1 | Jász-Nagykun-Szolnok | 2 | Jászberényi KSE and Szolnoki Olaj |
| 1 | Vas | 2 | Falco KC and BC Körmend |
| 3 | Bács-Kiskun | 1 | Kecskeméti TE |
| 3 | Baranya | 1 | PVSK Panthers |
| 3 | Csongrád | 1 | SZTE-Szedeák |
| 3 | Fejér | 1 | Alba Fehérvár |
| 3 | Győr-Moson-Sopron | 1 | Sopron KC |
| 3 | Somogy | 1 | Kaposvári KK |
| 3 | Tolna | 1 | Atomerőmű SE |
| 3 | Zala | 1 | Zalaegerszegi TE |

== Final standings ==
| Pos | Team | Qualification or Relegation |
|---|---|---|
| 1st place, gold medalist(s) | Alba Fehérvár | Qualification to the Champions League |
| 2nd place, silver medalist(s) | Falco-Vulcano Energia KC Szombathely | Qualification to the FIBA Europe Cup |
| 3rd place, bronze medalist(s) | Zalakerámia ZTE KK | |
| 4 | EGIS Körmend | Qualification to the FIBA Europe Cup |
| 5 | Szolnoki Olaj KK | Qualification to the FIBA Europe Cup |
| 6 | PVSK-PANNONPOWER | |
| 7 | Kaposvári KK | |
| 8 | KTE-Duna Aszfalt | |
| 9 | Naturtex-SZTE-Szedeák | |
| 10 | Sopron KC | |
| 11 | Atomerőmű SE | |
| 12 | JP Auto - JKSE | |
| 13 | Vasas Budapest | Relegated down to Nemzeti Bajnokság I/B, due to financial problems. |
| 14 | MAFC | |

== All-Star Game ==
The All-Star Game was played on November 26, 2016 and was played at the Tüskecsarnok in Budapest.

November 26, 2016
17:00 CET

| Team East | 127–138 | Team West |

Tüskecsarnok, Budapest
Attendance: 3,000

| Team East | Team West |

| Pos | Player | Team |
Starters
| PG | (United States) James Kinney | Szolnoki Olaj KK |
| SG | (Hungary) Dávid Vojvoda | Szolnoki Olaj KK |
| SF | (Bulgaria) Ivan Lilov | Naturtex-SZTE-Szedeák |
| PF | (Serbia) Svetozar Stamenković | JP Auto - JKSE |
| C | (Croatia) Matija Poščić | MAFC |
Reserves
| G | (Hungary) Ákos Kovács | Atomerőmű SE |
| G | (United States) Brent Amiel Arrington | JP Auto - JKSE |
| F | (United States) Sam Thompson | Vasas Budapest |
| G | (Hungary) Máté Medve | Atomerőmű SE |
| F | (Serbia) Tomislav Ivosev | KTE-Duna Aszfalt |
| C | (Hungary) Levente Juhos | Naturtex-SZTE-Szedeák |
| C | (United States) Andrew Joseph Pacher | Vasas Budapest |
Head coach: (Hungary) Stojan Ivković (Szolnoki Olaj KK)

| Pos | Player | Team |
Starters
| PG | (Puerto Rico) Emmanuel Ubilla | Zalakerámia ZTE KK |
| SG | (United States) Christopher Smith | PVSK-PANNONPOWER |
| SF | (Hungary) Csaba Ferencz | Egis Körmend |
| PF | (Hungary) Péter Lóránt | Alba Fehérvár |
| C | (Hungary) Ákos Keller | Alba Fehérvár |
Reserves
| G | (Hungary) Benedek Váradi | Falco KC Szombathely |
| F | (Hungary) Szilárd Benke | Zalakerámia ZTE KK |
| G | (Hungary) Zoltán Supola | PVSK-PANNONPOWER |
| G | (United States) Justin Edwards | Alba Fehérvár |
| F | (Serbia) Marko Špica | Sopron |
| F | (United States) Jordan Loveridge | Egis Körmend |
| C | (United States) Terry Allen | Egis Körmend |
Head coach: (Croatia) Teo Čizmić (Egis Körmend)

== See also ==
- 2017 Magyar Kupa
