= Ákos Keller =

Hungarian basketball player

No. 6 – Falco KC Szombathely
- Position: Center
- League: Nemzeti Bajnokság I/A

Personal information
- Born: March 28, 1989 (age 36) Székesfehérvár, Hungary
- Listed height: 2.08 m (6 ft 10 in)
- Listed weight: 105 kg (231 lb)

Career information
- NBA draft: 2011: undrafted
- Playing career: 2007–present

Career history
- 2007–2013: Alba Fehérvár
- 2013–2016: Szolnoki Olaj
- 2016–2018: Alba Fehérvár
- 2018–2019: Pau-Orthez
- 2019: Körmend
- 2019–2020: Zadar
- 2020: Orlandina Basket
- 2020–2021: Śląsk Wrocław
- 2021–present: Falco KC Szombathely

Career highlights
- 9× Hungarian League (2013–2017, 2021-2024); 6× Hungarian Cup (2013–2015, 2017, 2021, 2023)

Ákos Keller (born 28 March 1989) is a Hungarian professional basketball player for Falco KC Szombathely of the Nemzeti Bajnokság I/A. Standing at 2.08 m, he plays at the center position.
