= Sterling Gibbs =

American basketball player (born 1993)

Personal information
- Born: July 17, 1993 (age 33) Scotch Plains, New Jersey, U.S.
- Listed height: 6 ft 2 in (1.88 m)
- Listed weight: 195 lb (88 kg)

Career information
- High school: Seton Hall Prep (West Orange, New Jersey)
- College: Texas (2011–2012); Seton Hall (2013–2015); UConn (2015–2016)
- NBA draft: 2016: undrafted
- Playing career: 2016–2024
- Position: Point guard
- Number: 4, 8, 10, 2

Career history
- 2016–2017: Egis Körmend
- 2017: Indios de San Francisco
- 2017–2018: Nizhny Novgorod
- 2018: Kaposvári KK
- 2018–2019: Kolossos Rodou
- 2019: Hermine Nantes Atlantique
- 2019: Inter Bratislava
- 2020: Koper Primorska
- 2020–2021: Antwerp Giants
- 2021–2022: Nymburk
- 2022–2023: Twarde Pierniki Toruń
- 2023–2024: Neptūnas Klaipėda

Career highlights
- Czech League champion (2022); Slovenian Cup winner (2020); Second-team All-Big East (2015)
Medals
Men's basketball
Representing United States
FIBA Americas U16 Championship
Gold medal – first place	2009 Argentina	National team

Sterling Dupree Gibbs (born July 17, 1993) is an American former professional basketball player. He played college basketball at Texas, Seton Hall and Connecticut.

== Early life ==
Gibbs was born and grew up in Scotch Plains, New Jersey and attended Seton Hall Preparatory School. He was a standout basketball player for the Pirates and averaged 20.8 points, 4.2 assists and 1.8 steals per game during his senior season and was named First Team All-State as Seton Hall won the Essex County Tournament championship, playing under legendary coach Bob Farrell. He was listed as a three star recruit and one of the 150 best college prospects in his class by major scouting services. Gibbs initially committed to play basketball at the University of Maryland, but decommitted after the retirement of coach Gary Williams and accepted a scholarship to the University of Texas.

== College career ==
=== Texas ===
Gibbs played one season for the Longhorns, averaging 2.6 points and 7.5 minutes played in 30 games. He announced after his freshman season that he would be transferring to Seton Hall University to be closer to his family.

=== Seton Hall ===
After sitting out the 2012–2013 season due to NCAA transfer rules, Gibbs averaged 13.2 points per game in his first season with the Pirates. At the beginning of the season, Gibbs was named the MVP of the 2014 Paradise Jam Tournament, after scoring 40 points against Illinois State in the tournament final. As a redshirt junior season, averaged 16.3 points, 3.8 assists and shot 43.6 percent on three-pointers and was named second team All-Big East Conference. During the season, Gibbs ejected from a February 16 game for striking Villanova guard Ryan Arcidiacono in the face with his elbow and was suspended a further two games by Seton Hall. After the season, Gibbs announced he was leaving the Seton Hall program and ultimately transferred to Connecticut.

=== Connecticut ===
In his final season of eligibility, Gibbs averaged 12.3 points and shot 38.7 percent on three-pointers as the Huskies went on to win the 2016 American Athletic Conference tournament.

== Professional career ==
After going unselected in the 2016 NBA draft, Gibbs played for the Washington Wizards NBA Summer League, averaging 4.5 points, 1.3 rebounds and 2.5 assists over the course of four games. He was then selected by the Windy City Bulls in the second round of the 2016 NBA Development League draft, but was waived by the team.

=== Egis Körmend ===
Gibbs signed with Egis Körmend of the Hungarian Nemzeti Bajnokság I/A (NB I/A) in December 2016. Gibbs averaged 14.4 points, 2.1 rebounds, and 3.3 assists over 27 NB I/A games as Körmend reached the semifinals of the 2017 Hungarian Cup playoffs and 15.2 points and 3.6 assists in the 2016–17 FIBA Europe Cup.

=== Indios de San Francisco ===
Gibbs played for the Indios de San Francisco de Macorís of the Dominican Republic's Liga Nacional de Baloncesto during the summer of 2017, where he played with his brother Ashton.

=== Nizhny Novgorod ===
Gibbs signed a two-year contract with BC Nizhny Novgorod of the Russian VTB United League on August 9, 2017. Gibbs only appeared in two games for Nizhny, both in the team's 2017–18 Basketball Champions League qualifiers, and averaged two points per game.

=== Kaposvári KK ===
Gibbs returned to Hungary after signing with Kaposvári KK on June 1, 2018. Gibbs averaged 20.7 points, 2.6 rebounds, 3.6 assists and 1.3 steals over 20 games with the team.

=== Kolossos Rodou ===
Gibbs signed with Kolossos Rodou B.C. of the Greek Basket League on October 15, 2018. He averaged 11.7 points, 1.9 rebounds and 2.7 assists in nine games before leaving the team.

=== Nantes ===
Gibbs signed with Hermine Nantes Atlantique of the French LNB Pro B on February 4, 2019. He averaged 15.3 points, 2.4 rebounds, and 2.9 assists in 18 games (six starts) for Nantes.

=== Inter Bratislava ===
Browning signed with Inter Bratislava of the Slovak Extraliga on September 14, 2019. Gibbs was waived by Inter Bratislava on October 2, 2019, after playing in two Champions League qualifying games, averaging 13 points per game.

=== Koper Primorska ===
Gibbs signed with Koper Primorska of the Slovenian League on January 7, 2020. Gibbs averaged 12.0 points, 3.4 rebounds and 2.4 assists in five Slovenian League games and was a member of the team's Slovenian Cup championship squad and averaged 12.5 points, 2.2 rebounds and 2.2 assists in six Adriatic League games before the league was suspended due to COVID-19. Gibbs was re-signed by Koper Primorska on July 27, 2020.

=== Antwerp Giants ===
On December 26, 2020, Gibbs signed with Antwerp Giants of the Pro Basketball League (PBL). Gibbs averaged 16.5 points and 4.5 assists per game.

=== ERA Nymburk ===
On August 3, 2021, Gibbs signed with ERA Nymburk of the Czech National Basketball League.

=== Twarde Pierniki Toruń ===
On October 26, 2022, Gibbs signed with Twarde Pierniki Toruń of the Polish Basketball League (PLK).

=== Neptūnas Klaipėda ===
On August 31, 2023, Gibbs signed a one-year deal with Neptūnas Klaipėda of the Lithuanian Basketball League (LKL). On January 3, 2024, it was announced that Gibbs had left Neptūnas Klaipėda and retired from basketball altogether due to family problems.

=== Coaching ===
Gibbs was named the head coach at his alma mater, [Seton Hall Preparatory School], prior to the 2024–2025 season. https://www.shp.org/news-detail?pk=1497763

== Personal life ==
Gibbs is the son of Temple and Jacqueline Gibbs, and has two brothers, Ashton and Temple Jr. "T.J.", who both also played basketball for Seton Hall Prep. Ashton played college basketball at Pittsburgh and professionally for several overseas teams and T.J. played for Notre Dame. His father played football at Temple University.

Gibbs is married with one child.
