= Justin Edwards (basketball, born 1992) =

Canadian basketball player (born 1992)

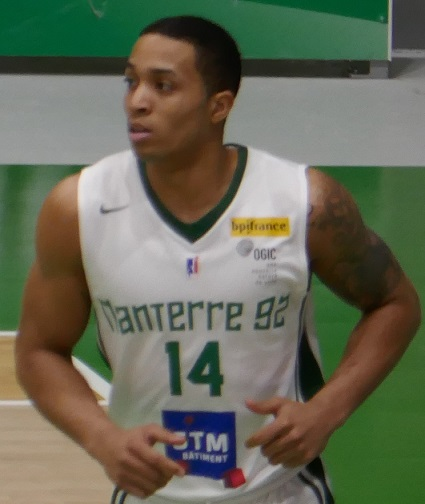
- Edwards playing for Nanterre in April 2018

No. 14 – Körmend
- Position: Point guard / shooting guard
- League: Nemzeti Bajnokság I/A

Personal information
- Born: October 31, 1992 (age 34) Whitby, Ontario
- Listed height: 6 ft 7 in (2.01 m)
- Listed weight: 198 lb (90 kg)

Career information
- High school: Anderson Collegiate (Whitby, Ontario)
- College: Maine (2011–2013); Kansas State (2014–2016)
- NBA draft: 2016: undrafted
- Playing career: 2016–present

Career history
- 2016–2017: Alba Fehérvár
- 2017: Orlandina Basket
- 2017–2018: Goyang Orion Orions
- 2018: Nanterre 92
- 2018: Ironi Nahariya
- 2019–2020: BC Körmend
- 2020–2021: U-BT Cluj-Napoca
- 2021–2022: KK Studentski centar
- 2022–2024: BC Körmend
- 2024-present: Club Africain

Career highlights
- Hungarian League champion (2017); Hungarian League All-Star (2017); Hungarian Cup winner (2017)

Justin Stefan Edwards (born October 31, 1992) is a Canadian professional basketball player for Club Africain of the Tunisian first division. He attended and played college basketball for the University of Maine and Kansas State University.

== College career ==
Edwards played two seasons at Maine and averaged 16.7 points and 5.2 rebounds as a sophomore. He transferred to Kansas State and sat out a season. As a junior at Kansas State, he posted 6.3 points, 3.3 rebounds, 1.6 assists, and 1.1 steals per game. Before his senior year, he exercised more in anticipation for an expanded role and led the Wildcats to a 7-1 start. Edwards had his best game at Kansas State in his last match, an 85-63 loss to Kansas in the Big 12 Tournament quarterfinals; he scored a career-high 23 points and grabbed 10 rebounds. As a senior, he averaged 12.7 points, 5.9 rebounds and 1.8 steals per game.

== Professional career ==
=== 2016–17 season ===
On July 28, 2016, Edwards started his professional career with the Hungarian Alba Fehérvár, signing a one-year deal. On November 2, 2016, Edwards recorded 22 points by playing just 24 minutes, shooting 9-of-11 from the field, along with three rebounds, six assists and three steals in 111–91 blowout win over Élan Chalon. He was subsequently named FIBA Europe Cup Top Performer of Week 3.

Edwards won the 2017 Hungarian Cup and the 2017 Hungarian League Championship titles with Alba, leading the team to its first titles in five years. In 47 games played during the 2016–17 season (played in the FIBA Europe Cup and all Hungarian competitions), he averaged 14.9 points, 4.2 rebounds, 3.2 assists and 1.4 steals per game.

=== 2017–18 season ===
On June 27, 2017, Edwards joined the Toronto Raptors for the 2017 NBA Summer League.

On July 24, 2017, Edwards signed with the Italian team Orlandina Basket. On November 12, 2017, Edwards recorded 24 points, shooting 8-of-12 from the field, along with six rebounds, four assists and three steals in an 88–81 win over Dinamo Sassari. He was subsequently named LBA Round 7 MVP.

On November 20, 2017, Edwards was transferred from Orlandina to the South Korean team Goyang Orions. On December 5, 2017, Edwards recorded a career-high 41 points, shooting 17-of-30 from the field, along with seven rebounds, three assists and four steals in a 100–99 win over the Seoul Samsung Thunders. In 38 games played for the Orions, he averaged 17.6 points, 4.5 rebounds and 3.6 assists per game.

On March 3, 2018, Edwards joined the French team Nanterre 92 for the rest of the season. Edwards helped Nanterre reach the 2018 Pro A Playoffs, where they eventually were eliminated by Strasbourg.

=== 2018–present ===
On July 24, 2018, Edwards signed a one-year deal with the Israeli team Ironi Nahariya. However, on December 13, 2018, Edwards parted ways with Nahariya after appearing in seven games.

On August 29, 2019, Edwards returned to Hungary for a second stint, signing with Egis Körmend for the 2019–20 season.

On July 6, 2020, Edwards has signed with U-BT Cluj-Napoca of the Romanian Liga Națională.

On 5 August 2021, Edwards signed a contract with KK Studentski centar (later SC Derby) of the Prva A Liga and the ABA League.
