= Winston Shepard =

American basketball player

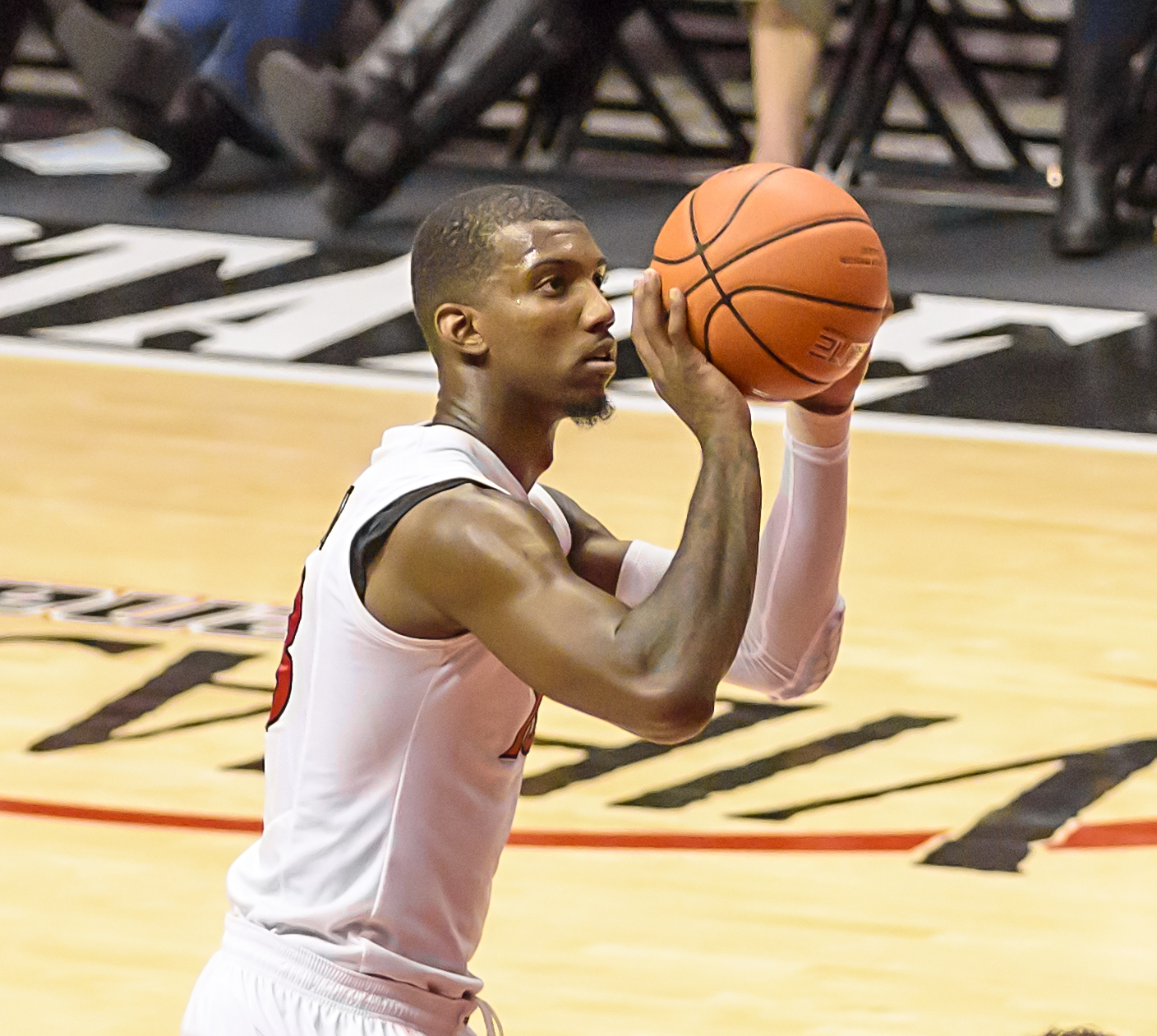
- Shepard with the San Diego State Aztecs in 2014

Personal information
- Born: September 22, 1993 (age 33) Houston, Texas, U.S.
- Listed height: 6 ft 8 in (2.03 m)
- Listed weight: 210 lb (95 kg)

Career information
- High school: Findlay Prep (Henderson, Nevada)
- College: San Diego State (2012–2016)
- NBA draft: 2016: undrafted
- Playing career: 2016–2023
- Position: Forward

Career history
- 2016–2017: Alba Fehérvár
- 2017–2018: Santa Cruz Warriors
- 2018: Canterbury Rams
- 2018: Maccabi Ashdod
- 2018–2019: Westports Malaysia Dragons
- 2020: Rayos de Hermosillo
- 2020–2021: Atomerőmű SE
- 2021: Titanes del Distrito Nacional
- 2021–2022: BC Odesa
- 2022: Southland Sharks
- 2023: Macau Black Bears
- 2023: FUS Rabat

Career highlights
- New Zealand NBL All-Star Five (2018); Hungarian League champion (2017); Hungarian Cup winner (2017); 2× Second-team All-MWC (2015, 2016); MWC All-Defensive Team (2016)

Winston Shepard III (born September 22, 1993) is an American former professional basketball player. He played college basketball for San Diego State, where he was a two-time second-team All-Mountain West Conference honoree.

== High school career ==
Shepard attended Findlay Prep in Henderson, Nevada. As a senior, he led the team to a 32–1 record and No. 2 ranking by USA Today. Findlay ended up winning the ESPNHS National High School Invitational title. He committed to San Diego State wanting "so bad," he said, to become the greatest recruit to ever sign with the school. 247Sports.com listed him as the 33rd best recruit in his class. Rivals.com, meanwhile, ranked Shepard as the 21st best player.

College recruiting
Name	Hometown	School	Height	Weight	Commit date
Winston Shepard; SF	Fresno, TX	Findlay College Prep	6 ft 8 in (2.03 m)	207 lb (94 kg)	Feb 16, 2012
Winston Shepard; SF	Recruit ratings: Scout: Rivals: (94)				

== College career ==
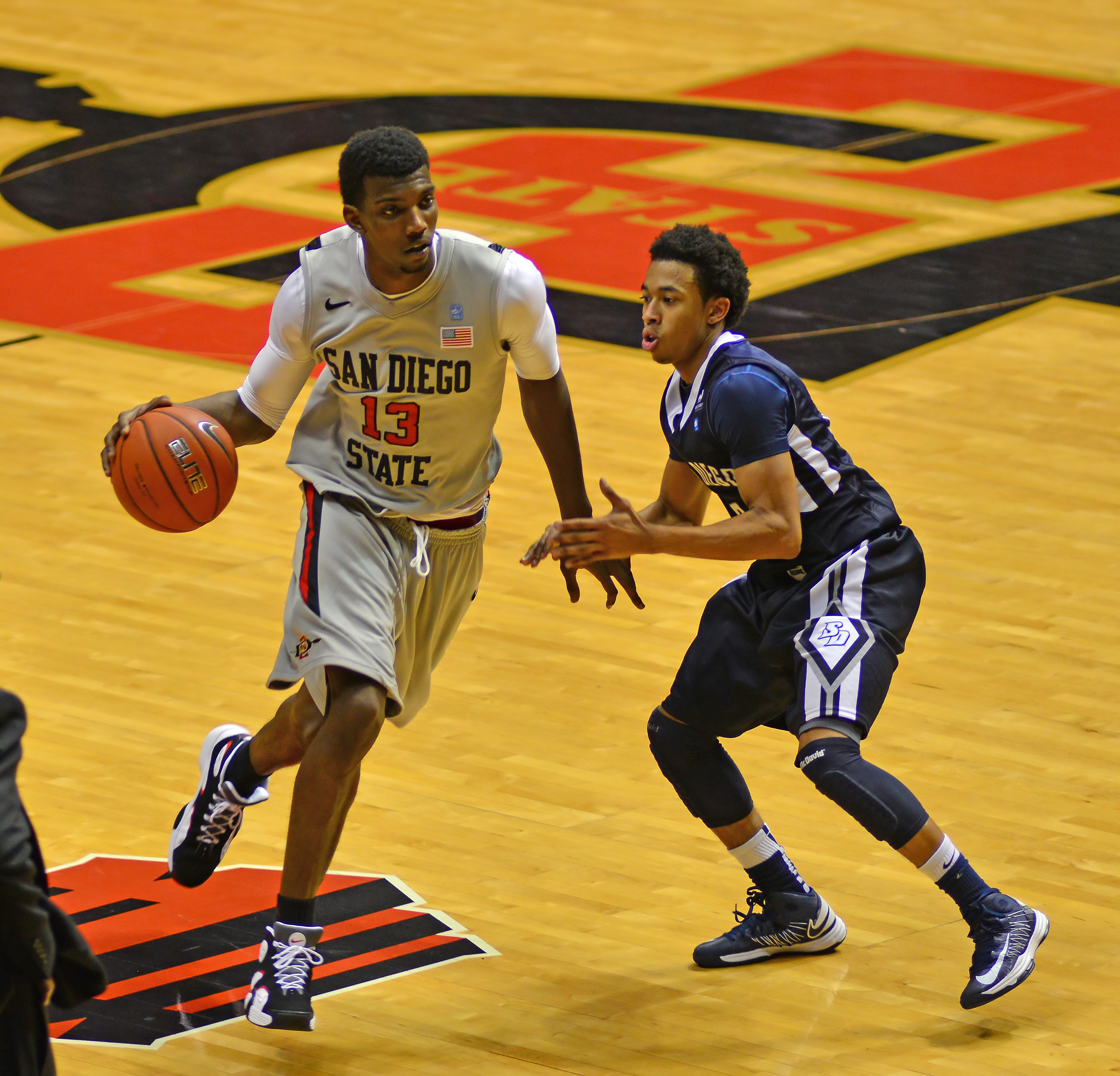
Shepard in December 2012

Shepard was suspended the first three games of his freshman year due to receiving improper recruiting benefits. He admitted to not being fulling engaged while playing. His best game was an 18-point outing against UNLV. As a freshman, Shepard averaged 5.7 points, 3.5 rebounds, 1.9 assists in 20.3 minutes of play.

Shepard was again suspended for one game in his sophomore season because he violated team rules. In the Aztecs' win over McNeese State on December 21, 2013, he scored seven straight points to ensure a victory. On December 28, he had a career-high 21 points in an 83-point rout of St. Katherine College. As a sophomore, Shepard averaged 11.6 points, 4.9 rebounds, and 2.1 assists per game. He started 34 of the team's 36 games. Ben Estes of The Sporting News wrote that "Shepard is able to do nearly everything, and that is especially true on defense, where his aptitude for matching up with almost any opposing player is a big boon to the Aztecs' swarming, stifling unit."

Coming into his junior season, C.L. Brown of ESPN commented that "his outside shooting could keep him from being a potential All-American and Mountain West Player of the Year candidate." He was named second-team All-Mountain West as a junior. He led the team with 11.1 points and 5.3 rebounds per game. Following the season, Shepard decided to turn down a possible selection in the 2015 NBA draft and return to school for his senior campaign. He claimed he needed to work on free throw shooting and finishing around the rim. "I have a chance to be part of something that can really, really be special, whatever special is," said Shepard of his decision to come back.

In 37 games as a senior in 2015–16, Shepard averaged career highs with 11.3 points, 6.4 rebounds and 3.1 assists per game.

== Professional career ==
=== Alba Fehérvár (2016–2017) ===
Shepard went undrafted at the 2016 NBA draft, but played in the 2016 NBA Summer League with the Golden State Warriors. On August 28, 2016, Shepard signed with Hungarian team Alba Fehérvár. He helped the team win the Hungarian Cup title and the Hungarian League championship. In 43 league games, he averaged 11.6 points, 6.1 rebounds and 3.1 assists per game. He also appeared in 12 FIBA Europe Cup games, averaging 10.8 points, 6.1 rebounds, 3.1 assists and 1.1 steals per game.

=== Santa Cruz Warriors (2017–2018) ===
Shepard participated in the 2017 NBA Summer League with the Atlanta Hawks. On December 21, 2017, Shepard was acquired by the Santa Cruz Warriors of the NBA G League. In 19 games for the Warriors, he averaged 9.5 points, 5.9 rebounds, 2.5 assists and 1.1 steals per game.

=== Canterbury Rams (2018) ===
In April 2018, Shepard signed with the Canterbury Rams for the 2018 New Zealand NBL season. He was named Player of the Week for Round 4. In 18 games, he averaged 18.1 points, 8.9 rebounds, 7.5 assists and 2.3 steals per game.

=== Mornar / Maccabi Ashdod (2018) ===
On July 21, 2018, Shepard signed with Montenegrin team Mornar. He left Mornar before appearing in a game.

On October 11, 2018, Shepard signed a one-month deal with Israeli team Maccabi Ashdod as an injury cover for Mark Tollefsen. In six games for Ashdod, he averaged 12 points, 5 rebounds and 1.1 assists per game.

=== Westports Malaysia Dragons (2018–2020) ===
On December 6, 2018, Shepard signed with the Westports Malaysia Dragons of the ASEAN Basketball League.

=== Rayos de Hermosillo (2020) ===
In March 2020, Shephard played four games in Mexico for Rayos de Hermosillo. The season was suspended due to the COVID-19 pandemic. He averaged 18.5 points, 11.0 rebounds, 4.3 assists and 1.8 steals per game.

=== Atomerőmű SE (2020–2021) ===
On June 30, 2020, Shepard signed with Atomerőmű SE of the Hungarian NB I/A.

=== Titanes del Distrito Nacional (2021) ===
In August 2021, Shepard had a five-game stint with Titanes del Distrito Nacional of the Liga Nacional de Baloncesto.

=== BC Odesa (2021–2022) ===
Between December 2021 and February 2022, Shepard played in Ukraine for BC Odesa.

=== Southland Sharks (2022) ===
On May 6, 2022, Shepard signed with the Southland Sharks for the rest of the 2022 New Zealand NBL season.

=== Macau Black Bears (2023) ===
In January 2023, Shepard played one game for the Macau Black Bears in the 2023 ABL season.

=== FUS Rabat (2023) ===
In October 2023, Shepard made his debut for FUS Rabat of the Division Excellence. He also played for FUS in the Road to BAL tournament.
