= Péter Lóránt =

Hungarian basketball player

Atomerőmű SE
- Position: Power forward
- League: Nemzeti Bajnokság I/A

Personal information
- Born: 23 October 1985 (age 41) Budapest, Hungary
- Listed height: 6 ft 9 in (2.06 m)
- Listed weight: 220 lb (100 kg)

Career information
- NBA draft: 2007: undrafted
- Playing career: 2006–present

Career history
- 2001–2004: Körmend
- 2004–2005: Debreceni
- 2005–2006: Antwerp Giants
- 2007: Manresa
- 2007–2011: Ford Burgos
- 2011–2012: Lagun Aro GBC
- 2012–2013: Virtus Roma
- 2013–2014: Szolnoki Olaj
- 2015: Victoria Libertas Pesaro
- 2015–2019: Alba Fehérvár
- 2019–present: Atomerőmű SE

Career highlights
- 2× Hungarian League champion (2003, 2014); 2× Hungarian Cup champion (2014, 2017); Hungarian Cup MVP (2017)

Péter Károly Lóránt (born 23 October 1985) is a Hungarian professional basketball player who currently plays for the Atomerőmű SE of the Hungarian National Championship.

== Professional career ==
Lóránt began his career in Hungarian team BC Körmend until 2004, when he signs with Debrecini. In 2005, he leaves the country to play with Sanex Antwerp Giants at Basketball League Belgium.

=== Básquet Manresa and Ford Burgos ===
One year later, in 2007, he signs temporarily with Ricoh Manresa at LEB Oro, Spanish second league. After finishing his period at Manresa, Lóránt signs for Ford Burgos where he played during four seasons becoming the captain of the team in the last one. Burgos played in 2010 and 2011 the finals of the promotion playoffs to ACB, but the team failed in both times.

=== Lagun Aro GBC ===
In summer 2011, he joins Lagun Aro GBC and plays Liga ACB. The team achieves for the first time the qualification for the Copa del Rey de Baloncesto 2011–12.

=== Szolnoki Olaj KK ===
After six years in Spain, in 2012 he leaves Lagun Aro GBC to sign with Italian squad Virtus Roma. In July 2013, Lorant signed with Szolnoki Olaj. On 20 December 2014 he parts ways with Szolnoki Olaj.

=== Victoria Libertas Pesaro ===
On 17 January 2015, he signed with Victoria Libertas Pesaro of the Lega Basket Serie A. On 25 June 2015, he parted ways with Pesaro.

=== Alba Fehérvár ===
On 24 August 2015, he agrees to 2-year deal with Alba Fehérvár-Puebla Plus of the Hungarian National Championship. After 2 successful year, Peter signed another 2-year deal on 26 April 2017, with Alba.

=== Atomerőmű SE ===
On 26 June 2019, he has signed a 2-year contract with Atomerőmű SE of the Hungarian National Championship.

== Hungarian national team ==
Péter Lóránt plays also with the Hungary national basketball team.
