= Vasas SC (men's basketball) =

Vasas Budapest
- Leagues: Nemzeti Bajnokság I/A
- Arena: Sport11
- Location: Budapest, Hungary
- Team colors: red and blue
- President: Péter Zöldi
- Team manager: Saeed Armaghani
- Head coach: Bulcsú Sárosi
Home

Vasas Budapest (until 2016 Vasas-Akadémia) is a Hungarian professional basketball club based in Budapest. The team plays in the Nemzeti Bajnokság I/A, the highest division of basketball in Hungary.

The team is based on the basketball academy which is the first accredited basketball academy in Hungary. The adult team the successor of Kozármisleny SE. The academy had been started to operate in 2003 as MKB Euroleasing Kosársuli. In 2005 the bank renovated the sports hall in Pasarét (district 2 of Budapest), since then the team is part of the Vasas family and they played in there since 2016, when they reached the top tier championship and have had to move into a bigger sport hall, which is the Sport11 Csarnok in the 11th district.

== History ==
Several clubs played under the name Vasas in the history. In 1948 MÁVAG Acélhang SE, in 1950 their successor Vasas-MÁVAG won the championship. In the 50s they were several times runners-up and 3rd. In the 60s and 70s they played as Ganz-MÁVAG Vasas SE. They fall into the second tier in 1985.

== Honours ==
- Hungarian Division B

Champions (1): 2015–16
