= János Eilingsfeld =

Hungarian basketball player

No. 7 – Atomerőmű SE
- Position: Forward
- League: NB I/A

Personal information
- Born: February 5, 1991 (age 35) Pécs, Hungary
- Listed height: 6 ft 6 in (1.98 m)

Career information
- NBA draft: 2013: undrafted
- Playing career: 2007–present

Career history
- 2007–2012: PVSK Panthers
- 2012–2016: Paks Atomerőmű
- 2016–2017: Szolnoki Olajbányász
- 2017–present: Paks Atomerőmű

János Eilingsfeld (born February 5, 1991) is a Hungarian professional basketball player for Atomerőmű SE and the Hungarian national team. He participated at the EuroBasket 2017.
