= Csaba Ferencz =

Hungarian basketball player

No. 15 – Egis Körmend
- Position: Small forward
- League: NB I/A

Personal information
- Born: 24 May 1985 (age 41) Körmend, Hungary
- Listed height: 6 ft 5 in (1.96 m)
- Listed weight: 225 lb (102 kg)

Career information
- NBA draft: 2007: undrafted
- Playing career: 2002–present

Career history
- 2002–present: BC Körmend

Csaba Ferencz (born 24 May 1985) is a Hungarian basketball player for BC Körmend and the Hungarian national team.

He participated at the EuroBasket 2017.
