= Emmanuel Ubilla =

American-Puerto Rican basketball player

No. 0 – NH Ostrava
- Position: Point guard
- League: NBL Czech Republic

Personal information
- Born: 26 June 1986 (age 40) New York City, New York, U.S.
- Listed height: 1.90 m (6 ft 3 in)
- Listed weight: 185 lb (84 kg)

Career information
- High school: Freehold Township (Freehold Township, New Jersey)
- College: Lackawanna College (2004–2006); Fairleigh Dickinson (2006–2008)
- NBA draft: 2008: undrafted
- Playing career: 2008–present
- Number: 0, 8

Career history
- 2008–2009: Nový Jičín
- 2009: Atléticos de San Germán
- 2010: Indios de Mayagüez
- 2010–2011: Nový Jičín
- 2011–2012: Inter Bratislava
- 2012–2013: Kolín
- 2013–2014: Den Helder Kings
- 2014–2015: Tapiolan Honka
- 2015: Piratas de Quebradillas
- 2015–2016: Kaposvár
- 2016–2017: ZTE
- 2017–2018: Ventspils
- 2018: Kymis
- 2018–2020: Kaposvár
- 2020: Poitiers
- 2021–present: NH Ostrava

Career highlights
- Latvian League champion (2018); Hungarian League All-Star (2017); 2x Hungarian League assists leader (2016, 2017); DBL All-Star (2014); DBL assists leader (2014); NBL All-Second Team (2009); NBL All-Defensive Team (2009)

Emmanuel Lawrence "Manny" Ubilla (born 26 June 1986) is an American-Puerto Rican professional basketball player for the Czech club NH Ostrava. Standing at 1.90 m (6 ft 3 in), Ubilla mainly plays the point guard position. He played college basketball for the Lackawanna College Falcons and the Fairleigh Dickinson Knights and played professionally in several European countries.

== Professional career ==
During the 2013–14 season, Ubilla played for the Den Helder Kings of the Dutch Basketball League (DBL). Ubilla was the assists leader of the DBL season, as he averaged 5.6 assists over 36 games. Third-seeded Den Helder was eliminated in the semi-finals of the playoffs, losing 3–0 to SPM Shoeters.

On 14 August 2014, Ubilla signed with Tapiolan Honka of the Finnish Korisliiga. After the season, Ubilla signed with Piratas de Quebradillas.

On 26 October 2015, Ubilla signed a one-year contract with Kaposvár of the Hungarian NB I/A.

On 1 August 2016, Ubilla signed with Hungarian side ZTE.

On 19 August 2017, Ubilla signed with Latvian side BK Ventspils of the Latvian Basketball League and the Basketball Champions League. He averaged 11 points, 3.2 rebounds and 5.9 assists in 14 matches in the Basketball Champions League, where Ventspils was eliminated after the regular season.

On 3 December 2018, Ubilla returned to his former team Kaposvári KK of the Hungarian NB I/A.

== Honours ==
BC Kolín

- All-NBL Team
  - Second team (1): 2009
- All-NBL Defensive Team (1): 2009

Den Helder Kings

- DBL All-Star (1): 2014
- DBL assists leader (1): 2014
