= Brandon Taylor (basketball, born January 1994) =

American basketball player (born January 1994)

- Taylor with Bursaspor in 2026

No. 11 – Bursaspor
- Position: Point guard
- League: BSL

Personal information
- Born: January 8, 1994 (age 32) West Hollywood, California, U.S.
- Listed height: 5 ft 10 in (1.78 m)
- Listed weight: 170 lb (77 kg)

Career information
- High school: Pacific Hills (West Hollywood, California)
- College: Utah (2012–2016)
- NBA draft: 2016: undrafted
- Playing career: 2016–present

Career history
- 2016–2017: Alba Fehérvár
- 2017–2018: Steaua București
- 2018–2019: Bergamo Basket
- 2019–2020: Le Mans
- 2020–2021: Pallacanestro Reggiana
- 2021–2022: BCM Graveniles
- 2022–2023: Ningbo Rockets
- 2023–2024: Manresa
- 2024–2025: Coruña
- 2025–2026: Virtus Bologna
- 2026: Panionios
- 2026–present: Bursaspor

Career highlights
- Lega Serie A champion (2025); Hungarian League champion (2017); Hungarian Cup winner (2017); Second-team All-Pac-12 (2015)

Brandon Charles Malik Taylor (born January 8, 1994) is an American professional basketball player for Bursaspor of the Turkish Basketbol Süper Ligi (BSL). He played college basketball for the Utah Utes.

== High School and College career ==
Taylor grew up in West Hollywood and attended Pacific Hills High School, where he quickly made a name for himself as a talented young point guard. From 2012 to 2016, Taylor played college basketball for the Utah Utes in the NCAA, establishing himself as a key leader and reliable playmaker for the team throughout his four-year collegiate career.

== Professional career ==
After going undrafted in the 2016 NBA Draft, Taylor launched his professional career overseas, signing with Alba Fehérvár in Hungary, where he captured a national championship in his rookie season. Over the following years, he built a diverse and accomplished career across Europe and Asia, playing for Steaua București (Romania), Bergamo Basket (Italy), Le Mans Sarthe (France), and returning to Italy with Pallacanestro Reggiana. His journey continued with stints at BCM Graveniles (Belgium), the Ningbo Rockets (China), Bàsquet Manresa and Básquet Coruña, both in Spain.

In May 2025, Taylor signed with Italian powerhouse Virtus Bologna, bringing his veteran leadership, quickness, and scoring ability to the team. Virtus eliminated Reyer Venezia 3–2 and their arch-rival Olimpia Milano 3–1, reaching their fifth finals in a row. They then defeated Pallacanestro Brescia 3–0, claiming the Italian championship title for the 17th time. For Taylor this was the first scudetto of his career. On 26 June, he renewed his contract with Virtus for the following season.

On January 14, 2026, he signed with Panionios of the Greek Basketball League.

On August 16, 2026, he signed with Bursaspor Basketbol of the Basketbol Süper Ligi (BSL).
