= Audi Aréna =

Arena in Hungary

Coordinates: 47.6981°N 17.6661°E

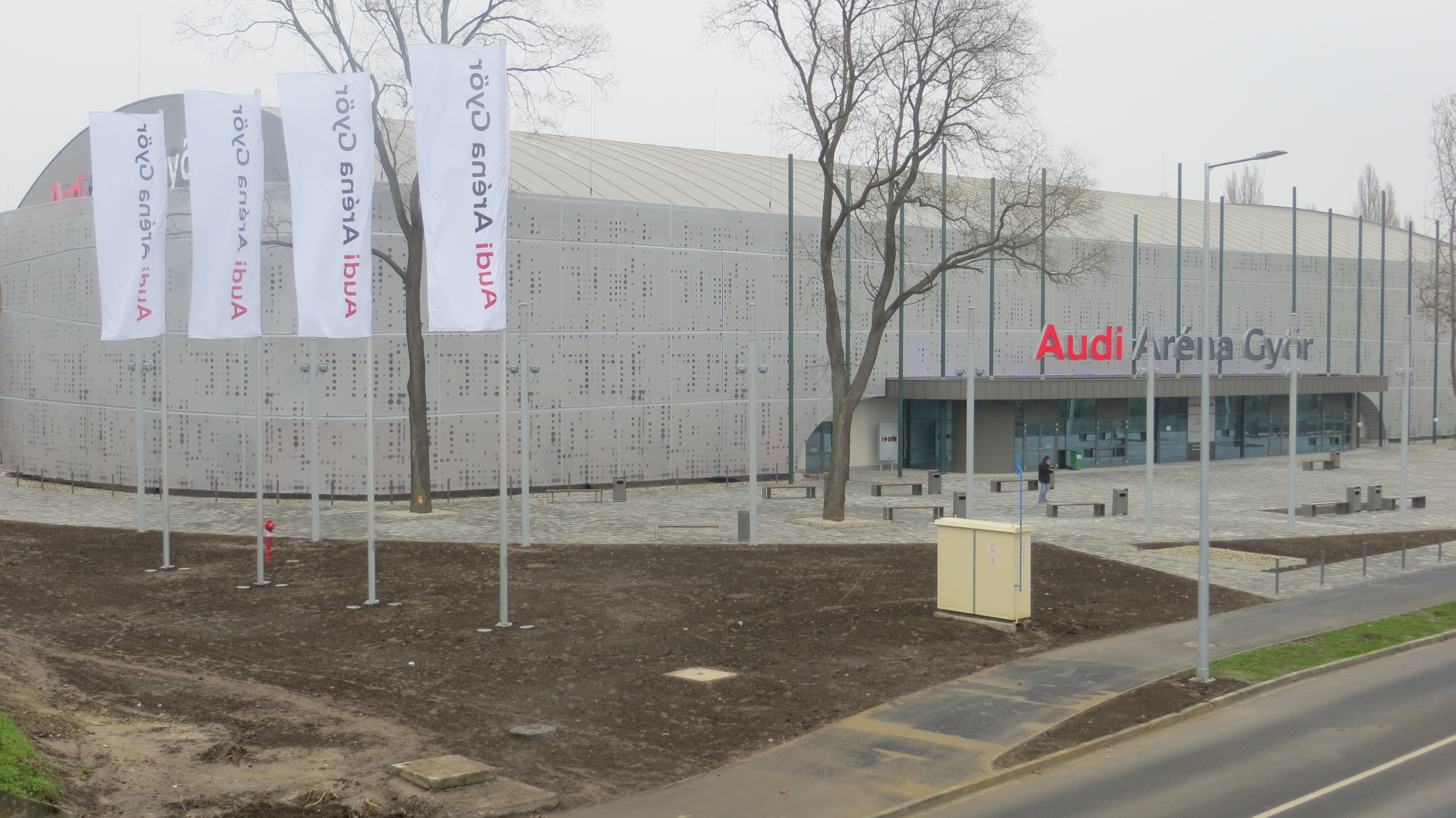
- Interactive map of Audi Aréna
- Location: Győr, Hungary
- Capacity: 5,500

Construction
- Opened: November 2014
- Cost: EUR € 16 million

Audi Aréna is a multi-purpose arena in Győr, Hungary. Audi Aréna holds 5,500 people and opened in 2014. It hosted the 2014 European Women's Handball Championship and the 2019 Women's U-19 European Handball Championship.

The arena was named after Audi, the main sponsor of Győri ETO KC.

The Audi Arena Györ is located only four kilometres away from the city centre with public transport stopping directly in front of it.

The new arena’s press centre seats 84 journalists, while the VIP area is big enough for 192 guests.

There are 1,100 parking spaces around the arena, providing plenty of space for visitors arriving by car.

== Gallery ==
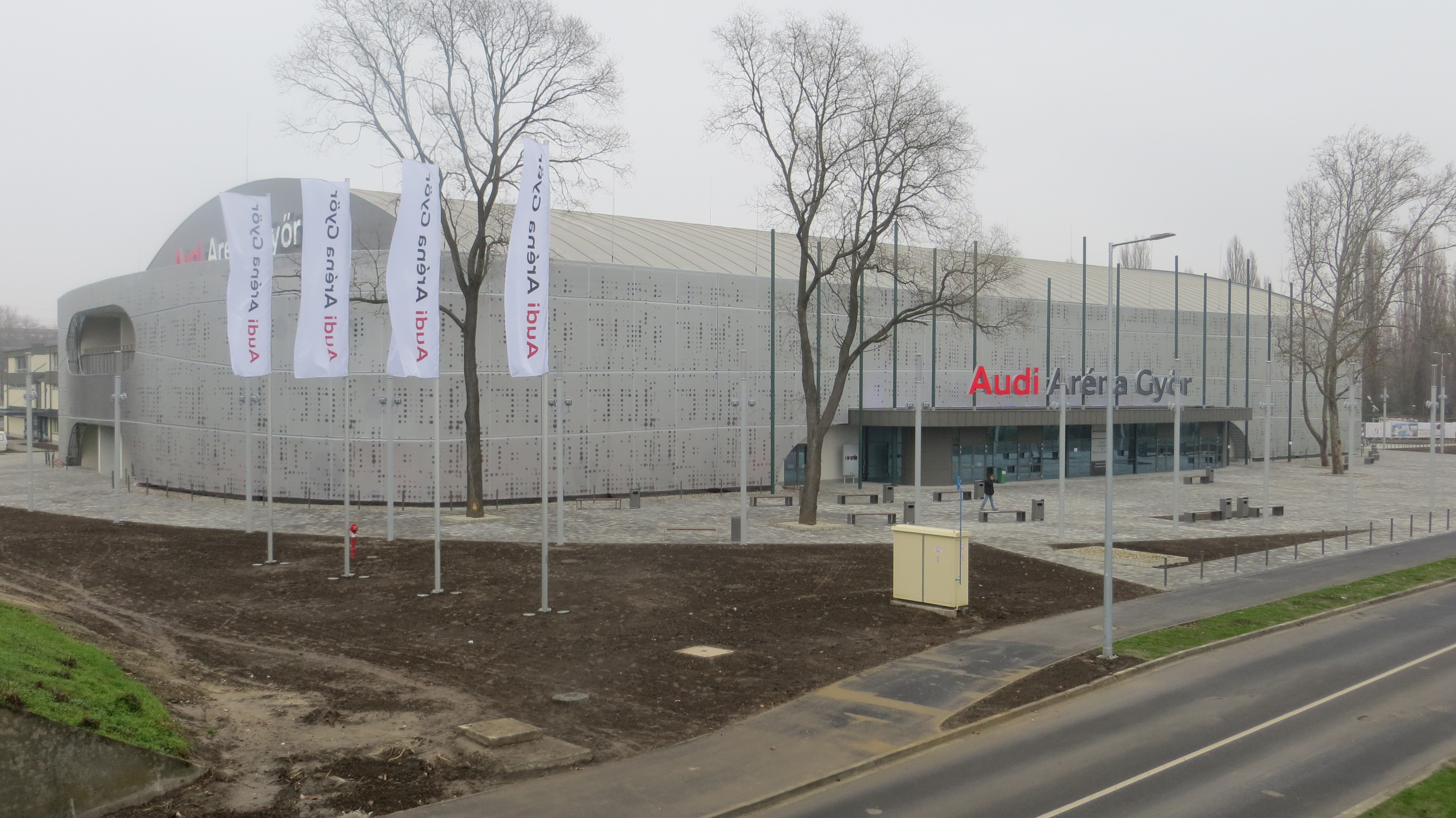

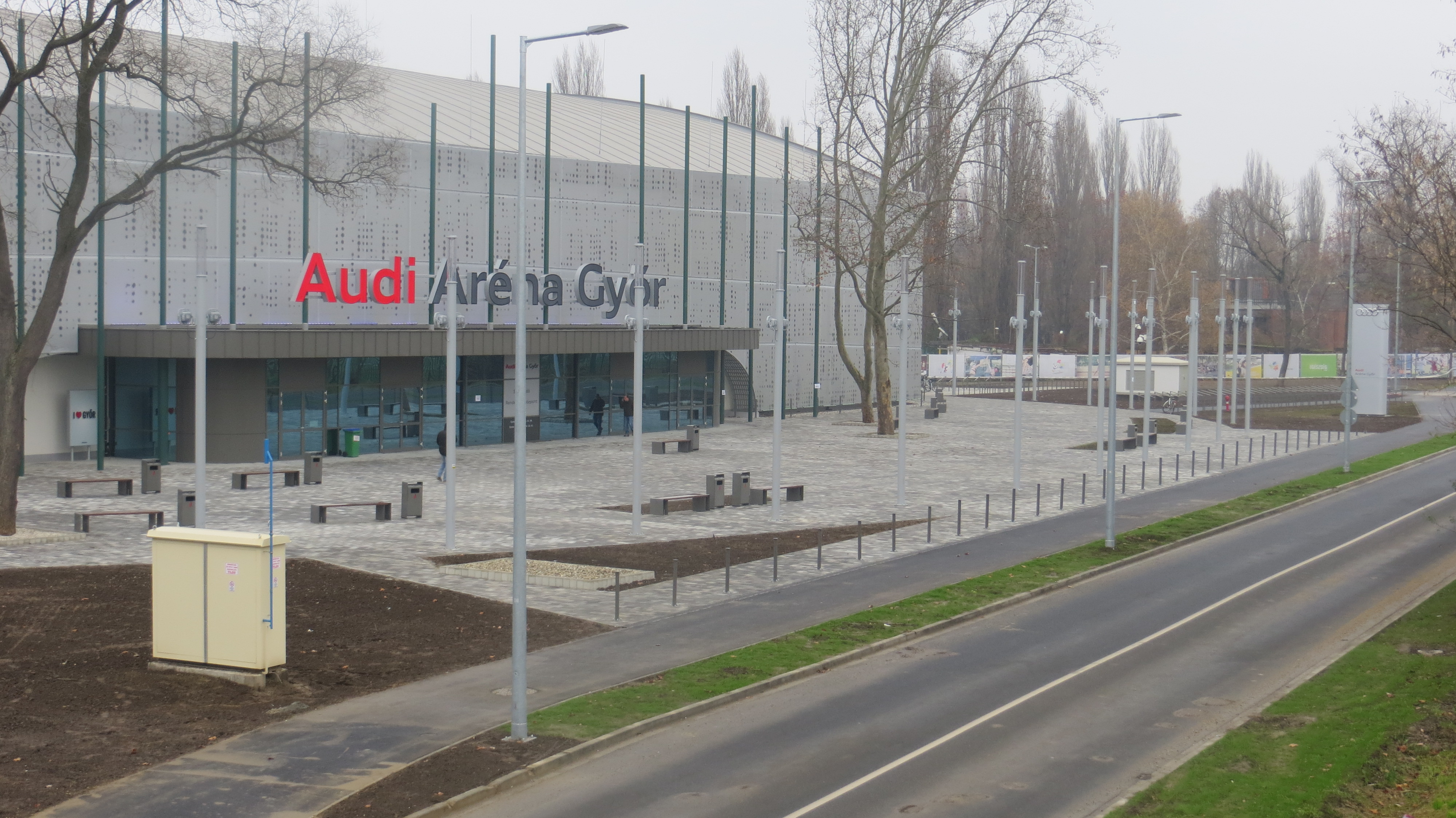

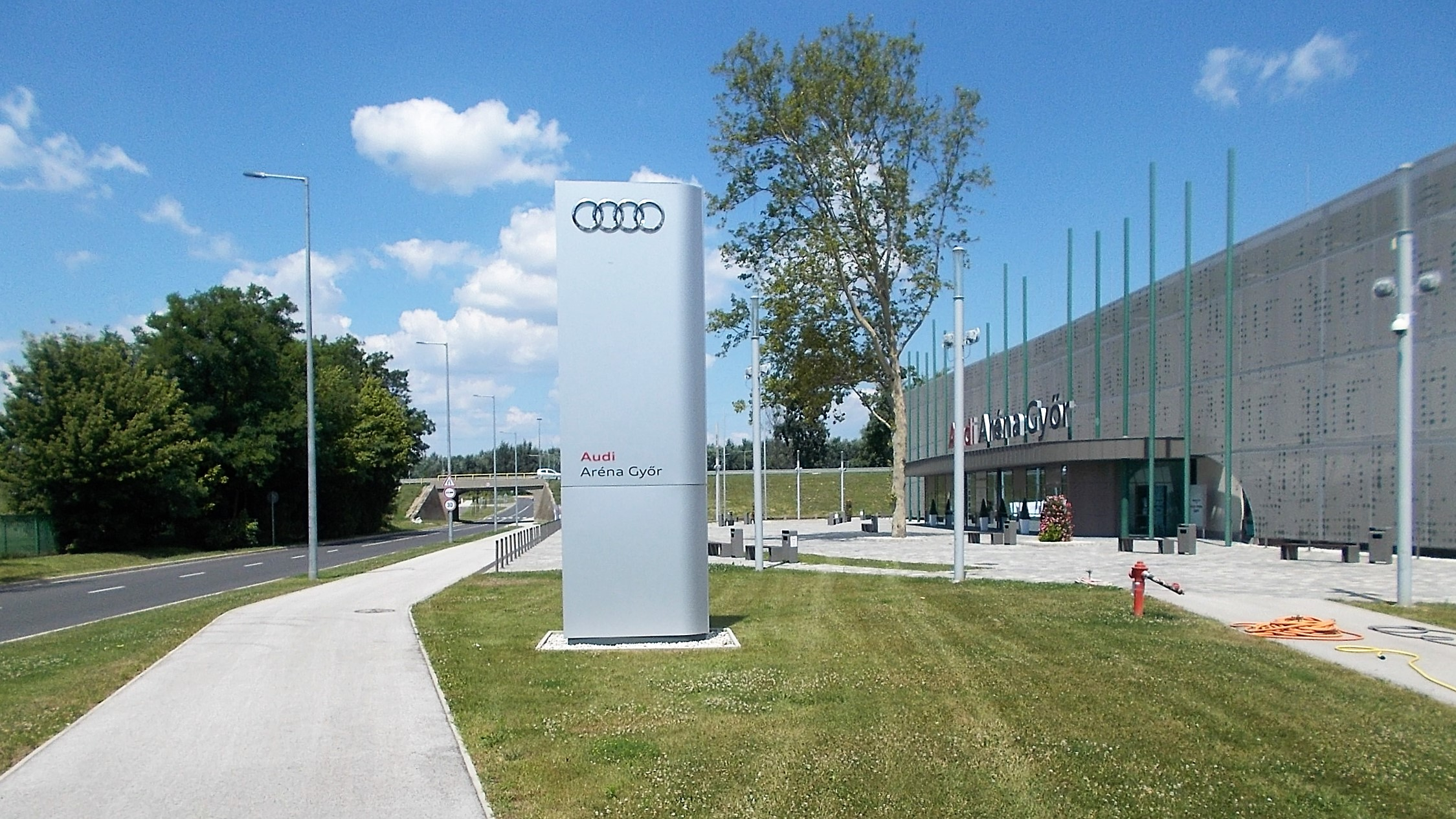

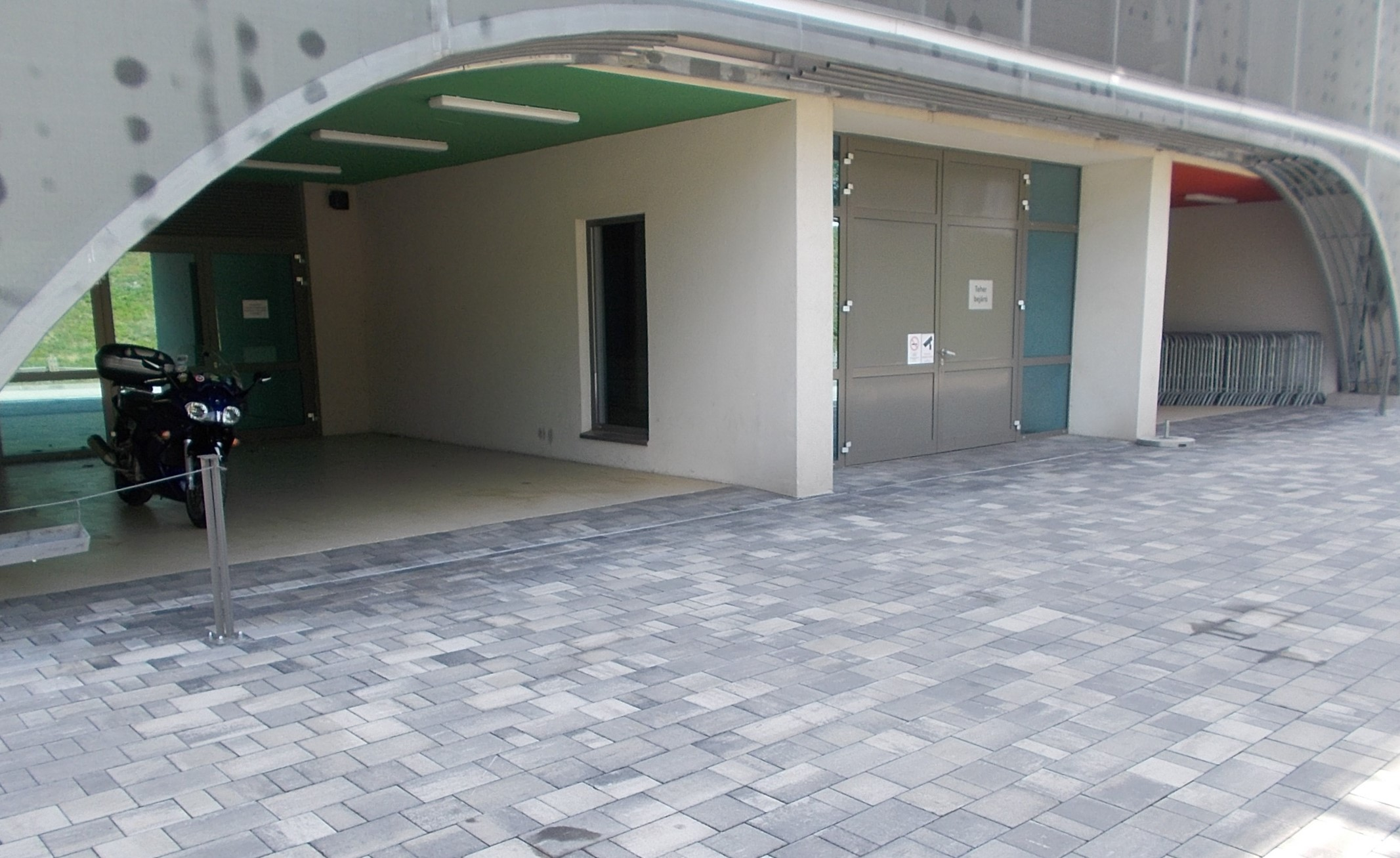

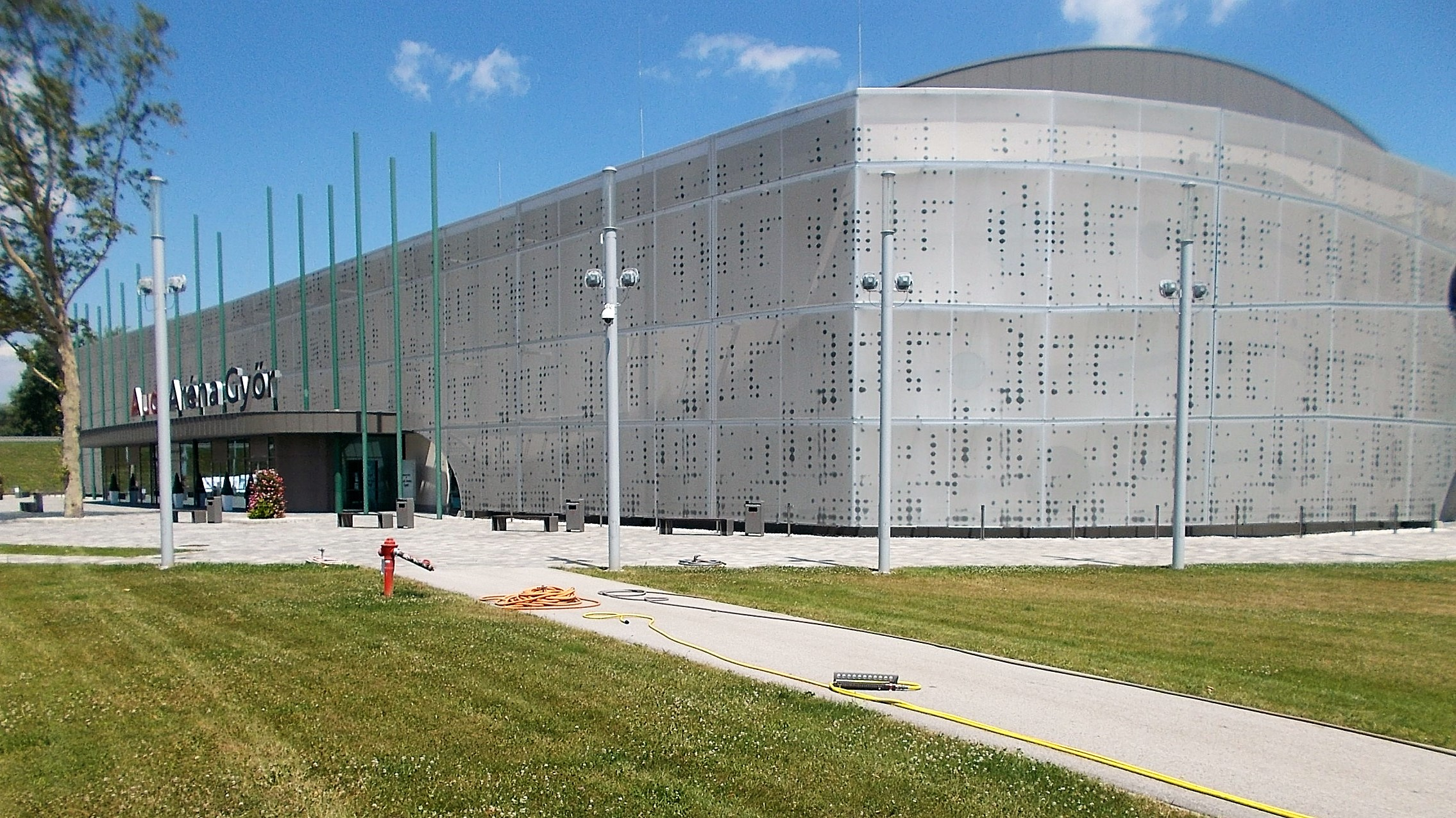

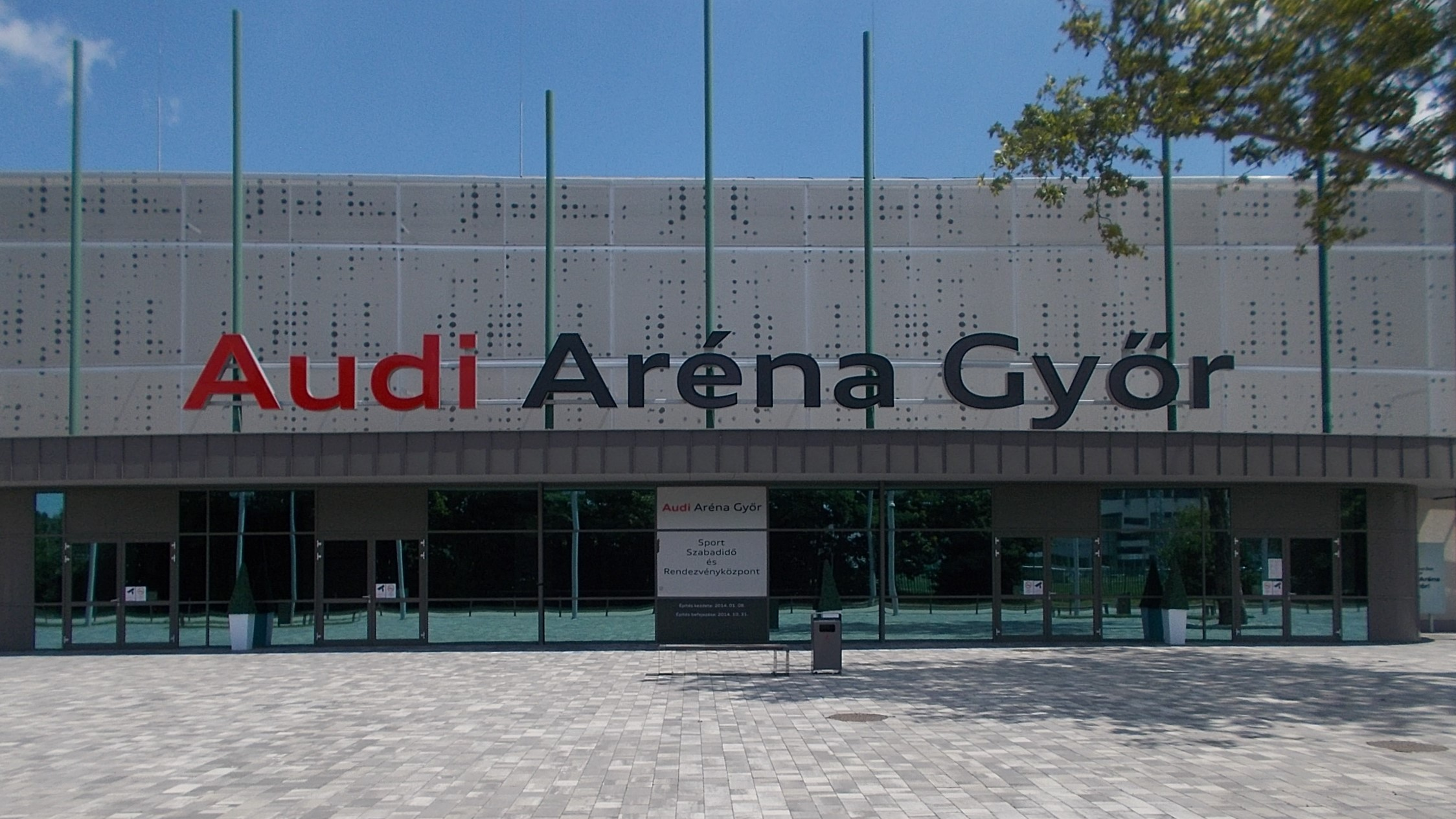

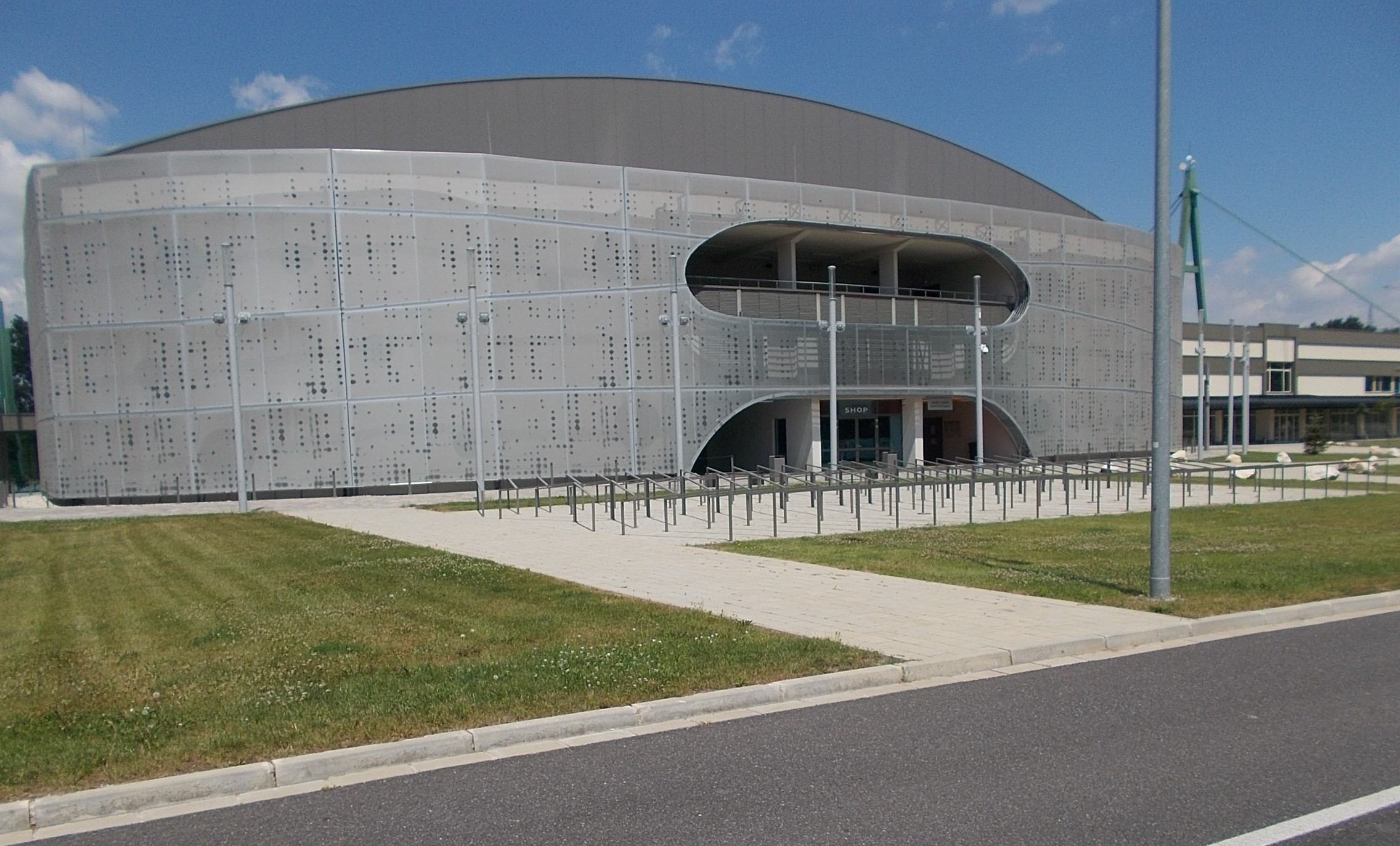

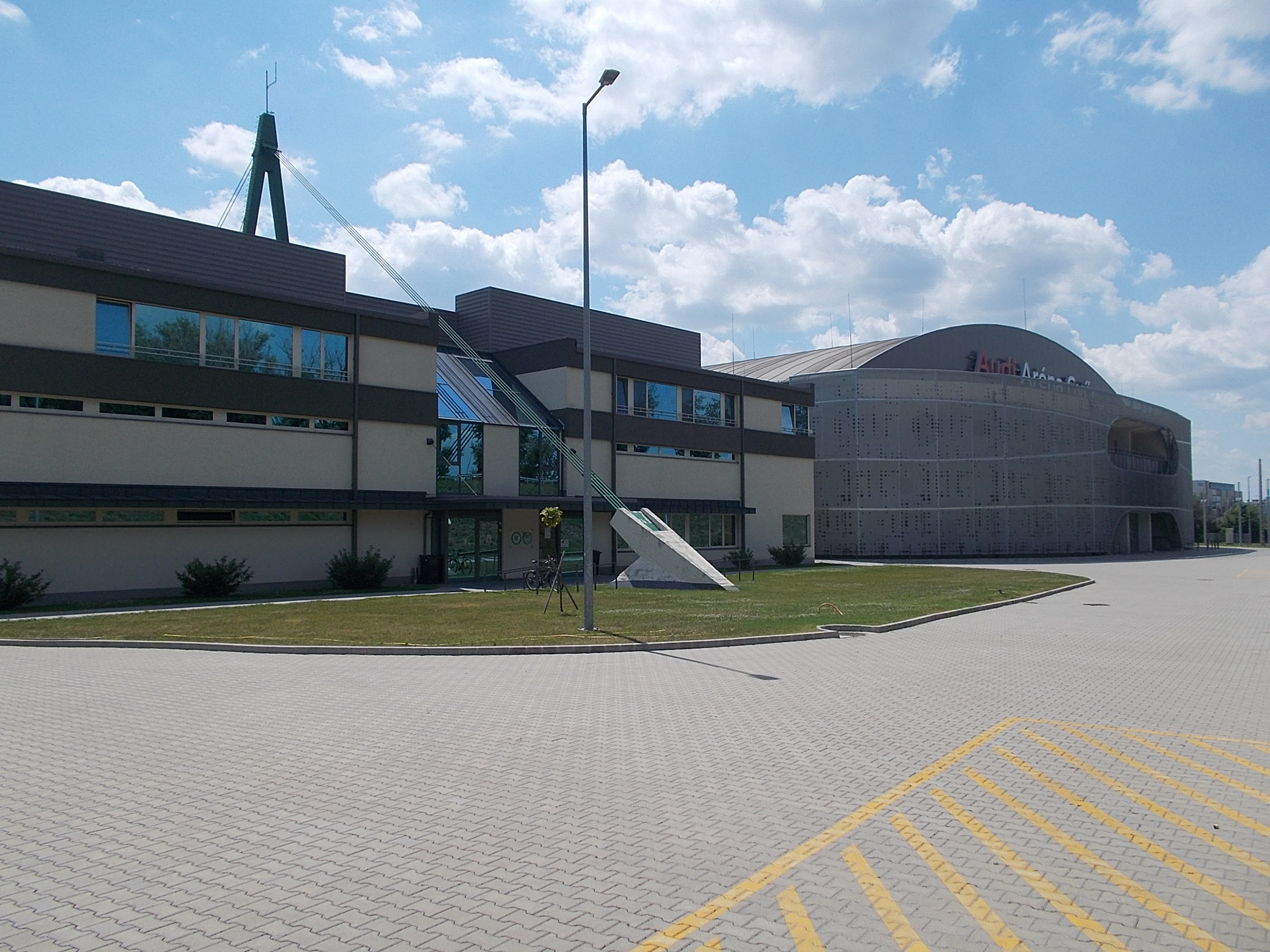

== See also ==
- List of indoor arenas in Hungary
