= Dávid Vojvoda =

Hungarian basketball player

No. 99 – Alba Fehérvár
- Position: Shooting guard / small forward
- League: Nemzeti Bajnokság I/A

Personal information
- Born: 4 September 1990 (age 36) Kaposvár, Hungary
- Listed height: 1.96 m (6 ft 5 in)
- Listed weight: 93 kg (205 lb)

Career information
- NBA draft: 2012: undrafted
- Playing career: 2006–present

Career history
- 2006–2010: Kaposvár
- 2010–2011: ZTE
- 2011–2013: Atomerőmű SE
- 2013–2019: Szolnoki Olajbányász
- 2019–2020: Reggiana
- 2020-present: Alba Fehérvár

Career highlights
- 3× Hungarian League champion (2014–2016); 4× Hungarian Cup winner (2014, 2015, 2018, 2019); Hungarian Cup MVP (2018)

Dávid Vojvoda (born 4 September 1990) is a Hungarian professional basketball player who currently plays for Alba Fehérvár of the Hungarian Nemzeti Bajnokság I/A.
