= Magyar Kupa (men's basketball) =

Men's basketball competition in Hungary

Tibor Zsíros Magyar Kupa
- Sport: Basketball
- Founded: 1951
- No. of teams: 8
- Country: Hungary
- Most recent champions: Falco KC Szombathely (3rd title)
- Most titles: Budapest Honved (17 titles)
- Broadcaster: M4 Sport
- Related competitions: Nemzeti Bajnokság I/A
- Website: zsirostibor.kosarsport.hu

The Tibor Zsíros Magyar Kupa is the annual basketball cup competition held in Hungary since 1951. Budapest Honved has won the most titles with 17. The Cup is named after the retired Hungarian player Tibor Zsíros. Each year, a knock-out tournament consisting of 8 teams is played to determine the winner of the Magyar Kupa.

== Finals ==
=== Knock-out format (1951–2014) ===
Season	Winner	Runner-up	Score
1951	Vasas MÁVAG	Bp. Haladás	41–39
1952	Vasas MÁVAG	Bp. Haladás	56–49
1953	Honvéd	Vasas MÁVAG	63–59
1954	Honvéd	Bp. Haladás	65–53
1955	Honvéd	Műszaki Egyetem Haladás	74–65
1961–62	Honvéd	MAFC	54–51
1962–63	Honvéd	MAFC	–
1964	Honvéd	MAFC	–
1965	MAFC	Honvéd	74–54
1966	Honvéd	MAFC	72–67
1967	Honvéd	MAFC	77–69
1968	Honvéd	MAFC	106–75
1969	Soproni MAFC	MAFC	85–70
1970	MAFC	Honvéd	85–77
1971	Csepel	MAFC	61–57
1972	MAFC	Honvéd	–
1973	Honvéd	MAFC	–
1974	Csepel	BSE	–
1975	Ganz-MÁVAG VSE	Csepel 12p	–
1976	Csepel	Honvéd	–
1977	Honvéd	Ganz-MÁVAG VSE	–
1978	Honvéd	MAFC	95–84
1979	MAFC	Bp. Vasas Izzó	100–89
1980–81	MAFC	Ganz-MÁVAG VSE	82–72
1981–82	Honvéd	MAFC	–
1982–83	Honvéd	MAFC	82–80
1983–84	Csepel	Zalaegerszegi TE	85–77
1984–85	Csepel	Honvéd	92–85
1985–86	Honvéd	Bajai SK	76–75
1986–87	Bajai SK	Tungsram SC	67–62
1987–88	Zalaegerszegi TE	Oroszlányi Bányász	80–78
1988–89	Honvéd	Oroszlányi Bányász	83–75
1989–90	Körmendi Dózsa MTE	Honvéd	63–62
1990–91	Honvéd	Atomerőmű SE	96–69
1991–92	Zalaegerszegi TE-Heraklith	Honvéd	84–75
1992–93	Körmend-Hunor KC	Szolnoki Olajbányász	80–68
1993–94	Körmend KC	Szolnoki Olajbányász	68–67
1994–95	Marc-Körmend KC	Szolnoki Olaj KK	95–90
1995–96	Zalaegerszegi TE-Goldsun	Honvéd	68–67
1996–97	Marc-Körmend KC	Honvéd	82–72
1997–98	BC Marc-Körmend	Falco-Lépték KC	81–69
1998–99	Albacomp-SZÜV	BC Marc-Körmend	92–87
1999–00	Albacomp-UPC	Matáv SE Pécs	74–56
2000–01	Atomerőmű SE	KlímaVill-Purina-Kaposvári KK	94–82
2001–02	Mol Szolnok KK	Atomerőmű SE	91–82
2002–03	Atomerőmű SE	Debreceni Vadkakasok	91–68
2003–04	Kaposvári KK	Albacomp	83–81
2004–05	Atomerőmű SE	Albacomp	80–71
2005–06	Univer KSE	Atomerőmű SE	82–79
2006–07	Szolnoki Olaj KK	Lami-Véd Körmend KC	80–67
2007–08	Atomerőmű SE	Falco-Szova KC-Szombathely	107–96
2008–09	Pécsi VSK-Pannonpower	Falco KC-Szombathely	98–87
2009–10	Zalakerámia-Zalaegerszegi TE	Falco KC-Szombathely	91–74
2010–11	Szolnoki Olaj KK	Albacomp	79–71
2011–12	Szolnoki Olaj KK	Atomerőmű SE	85–75
2012–13	Alba Fehérvár	Szolnoki Olaj KK	74–54

=== Final Eight format (2014–present) ===
Since 2014, a knock-out tournament consisting of 8 teams is held each year. Teams qualify based on their position in the NB I/A season. The cup has been named after famous Hungarian basketball player, coach and referee, Tibor Zsíros.

Year	Champions	Score	Runners-up	Bronze medal	Fourth place	Venue
2014	Szolnoki Olaj	70–68	Sopron KC	KTE	Atomerőmű SE	Lauber Sports Hall, Pécs
2015	Szolnoki Olaj	67–49	KTE	Atomerőmű SE	Sopron KC	Tüskecsarnok, Budapest
2016	Körmend	68–55	Szolnoki Olaj	Sopron KC	PVSK Panthers	SYMA Sports and Conference Center, Budapest
2017	Alba Fehérvár	59–58	Szolnoki Olaj	Szedeák	Körmend	Audi Aréna, Győr
2018	Szolnoki Olaj	82–67	Falco	Atomerőmű SE	Alba Fehérvár	Főnix Hall, Debrecen
2019	Szolnoki Olaj	92–83	Falco	DEAC	JKSE	Audi Aréna, Győr
2020	Cancelled due to the COVID-19 pandemic.					
2021	Falco	67–64	DEAC	Szolnoki Olaj	Körmend	Ludovika Aréna, Budapest
2022	Szolnoki Olaj	100–72	Szedeák	Kecskemét	Alba Fehérvár	Főnix Aréna, Debrecen
2023	Falco	92–48	Sopron	Szolnoki Olaj	Kecskemét	Tüskecsarnok, Budapest
2024	Szolnoki Olaj	96–80	Szedeák	Falco	NKA Universitas Pécs	Bok Sportcsarnok, Budapest
2025	Falco	101–76	Körmend	Atomerőmű SE	DEAC	Kaposvár Aréna, Kaposvár

== Final top scorers and Most Valuable Players ==
Since 2017, a Most Valuable Player award is given to the best player on the Cup title winning team;

Year	Top scorer			MVP	
Year	Player	Team	Points	Player	Team
2015	(Serbia) Strahinja Milošević	Szolnoki Olaj	18	–	
2016	(United States) Trey McKinney-Jones	Körmend	20	–	
2017	(Montenegro) Nikola Pavličević	Szolnoki Olaj	15	(Hungary) Péter Lóránt	Alba Fehérvár
2018	(Hungary) Dávid Vojvoda	Szolnoki Olaj	21	(Hungary) Dávid Vojvoda	Szolnoki Olaj
2019	(Hungary) Dávid Vojvoda	Szolnoki Olaj	31	(Hungary) Szilárd Benke	Szolnoki Olaj
2021	(Hungary) Zoltán Perl	Falco	20	(Hungary) Zoltán Perl	Falco
2023	(Hungary) Zoltán Perl	Falco	15	(United States) Matt Tiby	Falco
2025	(United States) Demajeo Wiggins (United States) Ryan Woolridge	Szolnoki Olaj; Szedeak	18	(United States) Demajeo Wiggins	Szolnoki Olaj
2025	(Hungary) Zoltán Perl	Falco	23	(Hungary) Zoltán Perl	Falco

== See also ==
- Nemzeti Bajnokság I/A
