= BC Körmend =

Egis Körmend
- Nickname: KOR
- Leagues: NB I/A
- Founded: 1962; 64 years ago
- Arena: Szentély Aréna
- Capacity: 2,000
- Location: Körmend, Hungary
- Team colors: Red, Black, White
- President: Ferenc Zsebe
- Head coach: Antonis Constantinides
- Championships: 3 Hungarian Championships; 7 Hungarian Cups
- Website: bckormend.hu
Home	Away

BC Körmend, named Egis Körmend for sponsorship reasons, is a Hungarian professional basketball club, based in Körmend. The club was founded in 1962 and has won the domestic championship three times (1987, 1996, 2003) and the domestic cup seven times (1990, 1993–1995, 1997, 1998, 2016).

== Sponsorship names ==
- Körmendi FMTE (1962–1981)
- Körmendi Dózsa MTE (1982–1990)
- Körmend-Hunor KC (1990–1994)
- Marc-Körmend (1995–2005)
- Polaroid–Lami-Véd Körmend (2005–2009)
- MJUS-Fortress Körmend (2009–2012)
- Lami-Véd Körmend (2012–2014)
- Ingoknito Fashion Körmend (2013–2014; European competitions)
- Egis Körmend (2014–present)

== Honours ==
- Nemzeti Bajnokság I/A
  - Champions (3): 1986–87, 1995–96, 2002–03
    - Runners-up (6): 1989–90, 1996–97, 2001–02, 2006–07, 2007–08, 2021–22
- Hungarian Cup
  - Winners (7): 1990, 1993, 1994, 1995, 1997, 1998, 2016
    - Runners-up (3): 1999, 2007, 2025
- Alpe Adria Cup:
  - Winners (1): 2018–19

== Season by season ==
Season	Tier	League	Pos.	Domestic cup	European competitions	
1989–90	1	NB I/A	2nd	Champion		
1990–91	1	NB I/A	4th		2 Cup Winners' Cup	T16
1991–92	1	NB I/A	2nd	Third place	3 Korać Cup	R1
1992–93	1	NB I/A	4th	Champion	3 Korać Cup	R2
1993–94	1	NB I/A	3rd	Champion		
1994–95	1	NB I/A	4th	Champion	2 European Cup	R2
1995–96	1	NB I/A	1st	Third place	2 European Cup	R2
1996–97	1	NB I/A	2nd	Champion	2 EuroCup	R32
1997–98	1	NB I/A	4th	Champion	2 EuroCup	R32
1998–99	1	NB I/A	5th	Runner-up	2 Saporta Cup	PR
1999–00	1	NB I/A	4th			
2000–01	1	NB I/A	3rd			
2001–02	1	NB I/A	2nd			
2002–03	1	NB I/A	1st	Third place		
2003–04	1	NB I/A	5th			
2004–05	1	NB I/A	9th			
2005–06	1	NB I/A	3rd			
2006–07	1	NB I/A	2nd	Runner-up		
2007–08	1	NB I/A	2nd	Third place		
2008–09	1	NB I/A	10th	Third place		
2009–10	1	NB I/A	3rd			
2010–11	1	NB I/A	4th			
2011–12	1	NB I/A	4th	Third place		
2012–13	1	NB I/A	6th		3 EuroChallenge	RS
2013–14	1	NB I/A	8th	Quarterfinalist	3 EuroChallenge	RS
2014–15	1	NB I/A	10th	did not qualify	3 EuroChallenge	RS
2015–16	1	NB I/A	3rd	Champion	3 FIBA Europe Cup	RS
2016–17	1	NB I/A	4th	Fourth place	4 FIBA Europe Cup	R16
2017–18	1	NB I/A	4th	Quarterfinalist	4 FIBA Europe Cup	R16
2018–19	1	NB I/A	2nd	Quarterfinalist		
2019–20	1	NB I/A	2nd^{1}	Cancalled^{1}	4 FIBA Europe Cup	R2
2020–21	1	NB I/A	7th	Fourth place	4 FIBA Europe Cup	RS
2021–22	1	NB I/A	2nd	Quarterfinalist		
2022–23	1	NB I/A	3rd	did not qualify	3 Champions League	QR
2023–24	1	NB I/A	10th	Quarterfinalist	4 FIBA Europe Cup	QT
2024–25	1	NB I/A	6th	Runner-up		

^1 Cancelled due to the COVID-19 pandemic in Hungary.

== Current roster ==
Note: Flags indicate national team eligibility at FIBA-sanctioned events. Players may hold other non-FIBA nationalities not displayed.

Egis Körmend roster
Players
Coaches

Pos.	No.	Nat.	Name	Ht.	Age
F	0	(Hungary)	Geröly, Márton	1.98 m (6 ft 6 in)	21 – 15 June 2004
G	3	(Hungary)	Takács, Kristóf	1.95 m (6 ft 5 in)	23 – 30 November 2002
G	5	(Hungary)	Doktor, Péter	1.92 m (6 ft 4 in)	28 – 23 March 1998
C	6	(Croatia)	Čakarun, Marjan	2.04 m (6 ft 8 in)	35 – 27 April 1990
SF	7	(Hungary)	Durázi, Krisztofer	2.00 m (6 ft 7 in)	27 – 13 October 1998
G	9	(Hungary)	Kiss, Mátyás	1.93 m (6 ft 4 in)	24 – 3 July 2001
PG	10	(Hungary)	Herczeg, Kristóf	1.83 m (6 ft 0 in)	22 – 16 June 2003
G	11	(United States)	Mitchell, Wendell	1.90 m (6 ft 3 in)	29 – 26 March 1997
F	12	(Hungary)	Martínez, Ralf Ádám	2.02 m (6 ft 8 in)	25 – 16 October 2000
F/C	13	(United States)	Adams Jr., Eric	2.03 m (6 ft 8 in)	30 – 14 May 1995
G	14	(Canada)	Edwards, Justin	1.92 m (6 ft 4 in)	33 – 31 October 1992
F	15	(Hungary)	Ferencz, Csaba	1.96 m (6 ft 5 in)	40 – 24 May 1985
F/C	17	(Slovakia)	Balogh, Máté	2.07 m (6 ft 9 in)	25 – 17 April 2001
PF	23	(Nigeria)	Omenaka, Godwin	2.05 m (6 ft 9 in)	25 – 9 October 2000

Head coach

- (Cyprus) Antonis Constantinides

Assistant coach(es)

- (Hungary) Tamás Kocsis

Legend

- (C) Team captain
- Injured

- Roster
Updated: 4 January 2023

== Notable players ==
Note: Flags indicate national team eligibility at FIBA-sanctioned events. Players may hold other non-FIBA nationalities not displayed.

Criteria

To appear in this section a player must have either:

- Set a club record or won an individual award while at the club
- Played at least one official international match for their national team at any time
- Played at least one official NBA match at any time.

- (Hungary) Csaba Ferencz
- (Hungary) István Németh Jr.
- (Hungary) István Németh Sr.
- (Croatia) Ivan Grgat
- (Netherlands) Josh Duinker
- (Poland) Mirosław Łopatka
- (Romania) Rolland Torok
- (Georgia (country)) Giorgi Sharabidze
- (Kosovo) Erjon Kastrati
- (United States) Terry Allen
- (United States) Harry Bell
- (United States) Charles Edmonson
- (United States) Jordan Loveridge
- (United States) Lenzelle Smith Jr.
- (United States) Marquis Wright

== Head coaches ==
- (Croatia) Teo Čizmić (2014-2016)
- (Slovenia) Gašper Potočnik (2016–2018)
- (Germany) Matthias Zollner (2018–2020)
- (Slovenia) Žiga Mravljak (2020–2021)
- (Cyprus) Antonis Constantinides (2021–present)
