= 2019 Magyar Kupa (men's basketball) =

62nd season of the Hungarian Basketball Cup

2019 Zsíros Tibor Magyar Kupa
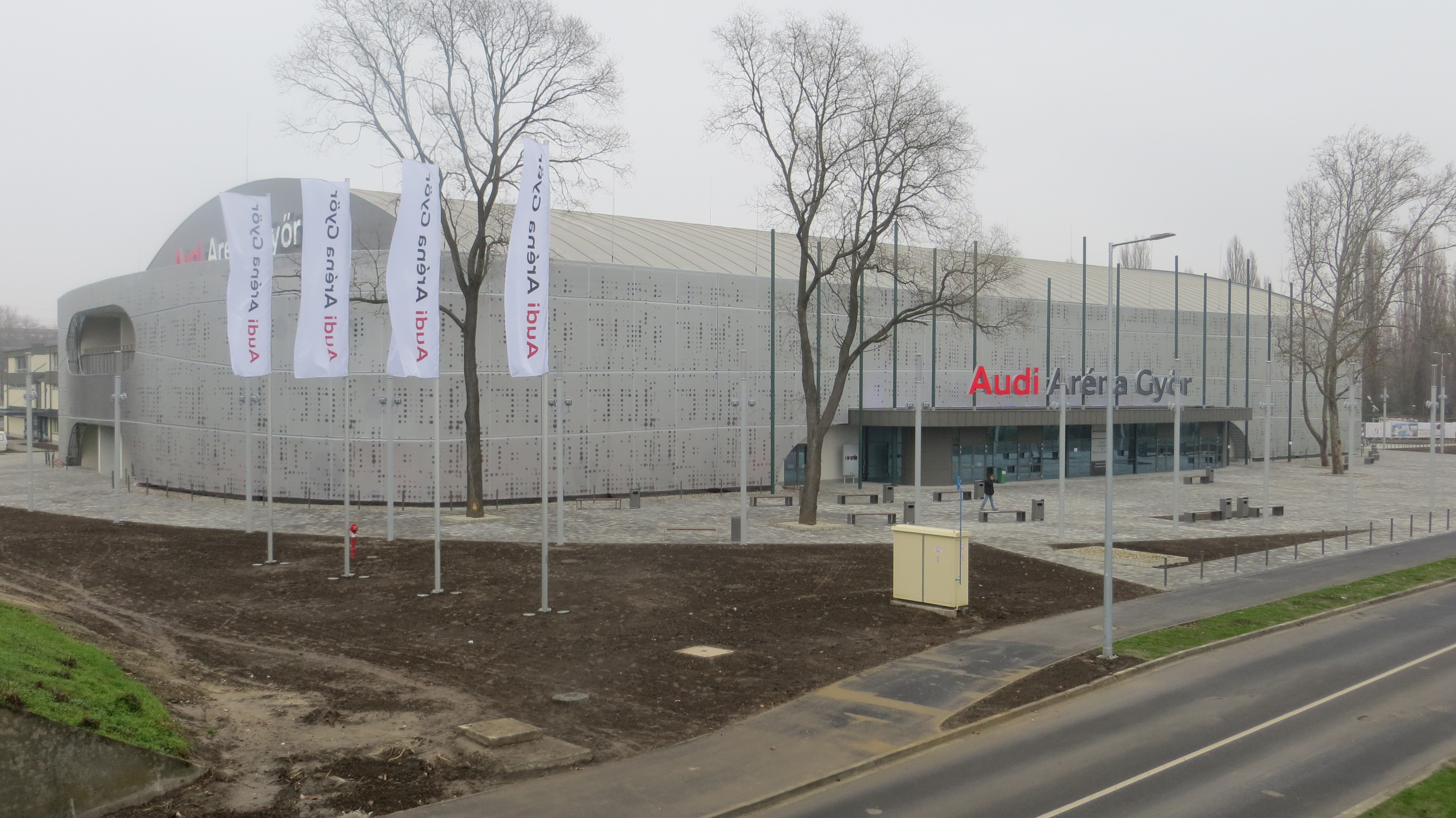
- The Audi Aréna hosted the tournament.

Tournament details
- Arena: Audi Aréna; Győr, Hungary
- Dates: 14–16 February

Final positions
- Champions: Szolnoki Olaj KK (8th title)
- Runners-up: Falco-Vulcano KC Szombathely
- Third place: DEAC
- Fourth place: JP Auto-JKSE

Awards and statistics
- MVP: (Hungary) Szilárd Benke
- Top scorer(s): (United States) Damier Pitts

The 2019 Tibor Zsíros Férfi Magyar Kupa was the 62nd season of the Hungarian Basketball Cup. Szilárd Benke was named Most Valuable Player.

== Qualification ==
Eight highest ranked teams after the first half of the 2018–19 NB I/A regular season qualified to the tournament.

1. Szolnoki Olaj KK
2. Egis Körmend
3. Falco-Vulcano Energia KC Szombathely
4. JP Auto-JKSE
5. Zalakerámia ZTE KK
6. Pécsi VSK-VEOLIA
7. Atomerőmű SE
8. DEAC

== Bracket ==
Quarterfinals; February 14
Falco-V. Energia KC Szombathely | 91
Atomerőmű SE | 83
JP Auto-JKSE | 91
Egis Körmend | 87
Pécsi VSK-VEOLIA | 85
Szolnoki Olaj KK | 91
DEAC | 81
Zalakerámia ZTE KK | 78

Semifinals; February 15
Falco-V. Energia KC Szombathely | 96
JP Auto-JKSE | 70
Szolnoki Olaj KK | 97
DEAC | 79

Final; February 16
Falco-V. Energia KC Szombathely | 83
Szolnoki Olaj KK | 92
Third place
JP Auto-JKSE | 91
DEAC | 112

=== Quarterfinals ===
| 14 February Quarterfinal I | Falco-Vulcano Energia KC Szombathely | 91–83 | Atomerőmű SE | Győr |
| 13:00 (CET) | Scoring by quarter: 23–26, 23–24, 23–19, 22–14 |
| | Pts: Reddic 22; Rebs: Balmazović 7 PIR: Govens 31 | Boxscore | Pts: Faust 24; Rebs: Eilingsfeld 9 PIR: Faust 26 | Arena: Audi Aréna; Attendance: 300; Referees: G. Kapitány, P. Győrffy, R. Török, (J. Nagy) |

| 14 February Quarterfinal II | JP Auto-JKSE | 91–87 | Egis Körmend | Győr |
| 15:30 (CET) | Scoring by quarter: 16–24, 29–22, 22–19, 24–22 |
| | Pts: Pitts 27; Rebs: Pantelić 8 PIR: Pitts 30 | Boxscore | Pts: Ferencz 18; Rebs: Hammonds 6 PIR: Ferencz 23 | Arena: Audi Aréna; Attendance: 900; Referees: Z. Pálla, P. Praksch, L. Minár, (A. Bernáth) |

| 14 February Quarterfinal III | Pécsi VSK-VEOLIA | 85–90 | Szolnoki Olaj KK | Győr |
| 18:00 (CET) | Scoring by quarter: 18–23, 19–18, 24–31, 24–18 |
| | Pts: Ćirić 20; Rebs: Taylor, Budimir 6 PIR: Ćirić 25 | Boxscore | Pts: Vojvoda 23; Rebs: Vojvoda 8 PIR: Vojvoda 30 | Arena: Audi Aréna; Attendance: 300; Referees: Cs. Cziffra, T. Benczur, B. Mészáros, (G. Dernei) |

| 14 February Quarterfinal IV | DEAC | 81–78 | Zalakerámia ZTE KK | Győr |
| 20:30 (CET) | Scoring by quarter: 16–20, 28–19, 22–22, 15–17 |
| | Pts: Dugat 26; Rebs: three players 8 PIR: Ivosev 35 | Boxscore | Pts: Ware 24; Rebs: Szabó 12; PIR: Thompson 29 | Arena: Audi Aréna; Attendance: 300; Referees: T. Földházi, D. Tőzsér, P. Frányó, (Zs. Várhalmi) |

=== Semifinals ===
| 15 February Semifinal I | Falco-Vulcano Energia KC Szombathely | 96–70 | JP Auto-JKSE | Győr |
| 15:30 (CET) | Scoring by quarter: 31–15, 20–20, 20–13, 25–22 |
| | Pts: Balmazović 18; Rebs: Váradi 7 PIR: Bruinsma 27 | Boxscore | Pts: Coleman 26; Rebs: Rakić, Pantelić 4 PIR: Coleman 29 | Arena: Audi Aréna; Attendance: 500; Referees: P. Papp, D. Tőzsér, T. Söjtöry, (L. Balogh) |

| 15 February Semifinal II | Szolnoki Olaj KK | 97–79 | DEAC | Győr |
| 18:00 (CET) | Scoring by quarter: 23–22, 32–12, 15–32, 27–13 |
| | Pts: Rowsey 22; Rebs: N. Milošević 12; PIR: N. Milošević 29 | Boxscore | Pts: Dugat 16; Rebs: Dugat 13; PIR: Dugat 13 | Arena: Audi Aréna; Attendance: 900; Referees: Z. Pálla, P. Győrffy, J. Ádám, (Zs. Hartyáni) |

=== Bronze match ===
| 16 February Bronze match | DEAC | 112–91 | JP Auto-JKSE | Győr |
| 14:30 (CET) | Scoring by quarter: 30–23, 27–30, 26–16, 29–22 |
| | Pts: Dugat 27; Rebs: Dugat 8 PIR: Dugat 39 | Boxscore | Pts: Pitts 32; Rebs: Aleksandrov 6 PIR: Pitts 44 | Arena: Audi Aréna; Attendance: 1,500; Referees: T. Földházi, P. Praksch, L. Goda, (M. Faidt) |

=== Final ===
| 16 February Final | Szolnoki Olaj KK | 92–83 | Falco-Vulcano Energia KC Szombathely | Győr |
| 17:00 (CET) | Scoring by quarter: 30–19, 17–13, 18–12, 27–39 |
| | Pts: Vojvoda 31; Rebs: Benke 9 PIR: Vojvoda 41 | Boxscore | Pts: Bruinsma, Govens 19; Rebs: three players 5 PIR: Govens 23 | Arena: Audi Aréna; Attendance: 2,300; Referees: Cs. Cziffra, G. Kapitány, T. Benczur, (P. Gencsev) |

| Starters: | | | Pts | Reb | Ast |
|---|---|---|---|---|---|
| PG | 0 | (United States) Andrew Rowsey | 19 | 2 | |
| SG | 9 | (Hungary) Dávid Vojvoda | 31 | 8 | |
| SF | 11 | (Hungary) Szilárd Benke | 26 | 9 | |
| PF | 23 | (Montenegro) Nemanja Milošević | 19 | 2 | |
| C | 4 | (Croatia) Lukša Andrić | 12 | 6 | |
| Reserves: | | | | | |
| F | 7 | (Hungary) Gábor Rudner | 0 | 0 | 0 |
| C | 15 | (Hungary) Ádám Tóth | 2 | 3 | 0 |
| C | 6 | (Nigeria) Samuel Taiwo | DNP | | |
| SG | 10 | (Hungary) Péter Kovács | DNP | | |
| SF | 24 | (Serbia) Strahinja Milošević | DNP | | |
| G | 33 | (Hungary) Marcell Frikkel | DNP | | |
| G | 30 | (Hungary) Bence Csák | DNP | | |
Head coach:
(Serbia) Dragan Aleksić

| Szolnoki Olaj | Falco KC |

| Szolnok | Statistics | Falco |
|---|---|---|
| 29/45 (64%) | 2 point field goals | 23/42 (55%) |
| 5/20 (25%) | 3 point field goals | 8/31 (26%) |
| 19/24 (79%) | Free throws | 13/19 (68%) |
| 36 | Rebounds | 25 |
| | Assists | |
| 7 | Steals | 12 |
| 16 | Turnovers | 10 |
| 2 | Blocks | 2 |
| 23 (25) | Fouls | 25 (21) |

2019 Magyar Kupa Winners
Szolnoki Olaj
8th title
MVP
(Hungary) Szilárd Benke

| Starters: | | | Pts | Reb | Ast |
|---|---|---|---|---|---|
| PG | 40 | (United States) Darrin Govens | 19 | 5 | |
| G | 10 | (Hungary) Benedek Váradi | 9 | 4 | |
| SF | 7 | (Hungary) Olivér Bíró | 0 | 0 | 0 |
| PF | 33 | (United States) Evan Bruinsma | 19 | 5 | |
| C | 1 | (United States) Juvonte Reddic | 11 | 5 | |
| Reserves: | | | | | |
| G | 11 | (United States) Ron Curry | 9 | 1 | 0 |
| SG | 9 | (Hungary) Zoltán Perl | 4 | 2 | |
| F | 21 | (Serbia) Stefan Balmazović | 8 | 1 | |
| PF | 13 | (Hungary) Norbert Tóth | 4 | 2 | 0 |
| SG | 25 | (Hungary) Péter Verasztó | DNP | | |
| SF | 12 | (Hungary) Patrik Hódi | DNP | | |
| SF | 15 | (Hungary) Bence Körmendi | DNP | | |
Head coach:
(Slovenia) Gašper Okorn

==== Final standings ====
| | Team |
|---|---|
| Hungarian Cup | Szolnoki Olaj KK |
| Silver medal | Falco-Vulcano Energia KC Szombathely |
| Bronze medal | DEAC |
| 4. | JP Auto-JKSE |
| 5. | Atomerőmű SE |
| 5. | Egis Körmend |
| 5. | Pécsi VSK-VEOLIA |
| 5. | 20px Zalakerámia ZTE KK |

== See also ==
- 2018–19 Nemzeti Bajnokság I/A
