= 2018 Magyar Kupa (men's basketball) =

2018 Zsíros Tibor Magyar Kupa
Tournament details
- Arena: Főnix Hall; Debrecen, Hungary
- Dates: 16–18 February 2018

Final positions
- Champions: Szolnoki Olaj KK (7th title)
- Runners-up: Falco-Vulcano KC Szombathely
- Third place: Atomerőmű SE
- Fourth place: Alba Fehérvár

Awards and statistics
- MVP: (Hungary) Dávid Vojvoda

The 2018 Tibor Zsíros Férfi Magyar Kupa was the 61st season of the Hungarian Basketball Cup. Szolnoki Olaj won its 7th national Cup championship. Dávid Vojvoda was named Most Valuable Player.

== Qualification ==
Eight highest ranked teams after the first half of the 2017–18 NB I/A regular season qualified to the tournament.

1. Szolnoki Olaj KK
2. Egis Körmend
3. Alba Fehérvár
4. Falco-Vulcano Energia KC Szombathely
5. Atomerőmű SE
6. KTE-Duna Aszfalt
7. Pécsi VSK-VEOLIA
8. Zalakerámia ZTE KK

== Bracket ==
Quarterfinals; February 16
Pécsi VSK-VEOLIA	83
Falco-V. Energia KC Szombathely	92
Zalakerámia ZTE KK	58
Atomerőmű SE	61
Alba Fehérvár	86
Egis Körmend	82
KTE-Duna Aszfalt	78
Szolnoki Olaj KK	89

Semifinals; February 17
Falco-V. Energia KC Szombathely	81
Atomerőmű SE	64
Alba Fehérvár	67
Szolnoki Olaj KK	75

Final; February 18
Falco-V. Energia KC Szombathely	67
Szolnoki Olaj KK	82
Third place
Atomerőmű SE	67
Alba Fehérvár	53

== Matches ==
=== Quarterfinals ===
16 February 2018	Pécsi VSK-VEOLIA	83–92	Falco-Vulcano Energia KC Szombathely	Debrecen
13:00 (CET)	Scoring by quarter: 34–25, 16–20, 21–14, 12–33
	Pts: Antóni 20; Rebs: Harazin 6 Asts: Budimir 6 PIR: Durham, Antóni 25	Boxscore	Pts: Govens 26; Rebs: Borisov, Taylor 7 Asts: Govens 7 PIR: Govens 34	Arena: Főnix Hall; Referees: P. Papp, R. Győrffy, J. Ádám, (J. Farkas)

16 February 2018	Szolnoki Olaj KK	58–61(OT)	Kaposvári KK	Debrecen
15:30 (CET)	Scoring by quarter: 23–18, 21–17, 21–26, 13–17, Overtime: 15–1
	Pts: Andrić 29; Rebs: Andrić 13; Asts: Vojvoda 7 PIR: Andrić 50	Boxscore	Pts: Frazier 19; Rebs: Cooke 10; Asts: Wisseh 10; PIR: Cooke 21	Arena: Főnix Hall; Referees: T. Földházi, T. Benczur, T. Hegedüs, (K. Páli)

16 February 2017	ZTE KK	73–98	Alba Fehérvár	Debrecen
18:00 (CET)	Scoring by quarter: 23–22, 10–22, 23–31, 17–23
	Pts: Norfleet, Benke 14; Rebs: Benke 7 Asts: Ubilla 5 PIR: Benke, Wright 19	Boxscore	Pts: Edwards 16; Rebs: Lóránt, Shepard 7 Asts: Shepard, Edwards 7 PIR: Lóránt 28	Arena: Főnix Hall; Referees: Z. Pálla, P. Papp, J. Ádám, (Zs. Hartyáni)

16 February 2017	Falco-V. Energia KC Szombathely	66–83	Egis Körmend	Debrecen
20:30 (CET)	Scoring by quarter: 8–17, 16–21, 21–19, 21–26
	Pts: Govens 23; Rebs: Govens 9 Asts: Govens 6 PIR: Govens 37	Boxscore	Pts: Smith 18; Rebs: Petty 11; Asts: Gibbs, Petty 5 PIR: Smith, Petty 25	Arena: Főnix Hall; Referees: Cs. Cziffra, G. Kapitány, G. Farkas, (L. Balogh)

=== Semifinals ===
17 February 2018	Falco-Vulcano Energia KC Szombathely	81–64	Atomerőmű SE	Debrecen
15:30 (CET)	Scoring by quarter: 20–21, 14–11, 25–18, 22–14
	Pts: Govens 22; Rebs: Váradi 8 Asts: Váradi 5 PIR: Govens 35	Boxscore	Pts: Guinn 20; Rebs: Eilingsfeld 12; Asts: Ruják, Guinn 4 PIR: Guinn 21	Arena: Főnix Hall; Attendance: 1,000; Referees: G. Kapitán, D. Tőzsér, P. Frányó, (P. Gencsev)

17 February 2018	Alba Fehérvár	67–75	Szolnoki Olaj KK	Debrecen
18:00 (CET)	Scoring by quarter: 16–20, 24–25, 15–17, 12–13
	Pts: Á. Keller 17; Rebs: Lóránt, Pointer 7 Asts: Hill 5 PIR: Á. Keller 25	Boxscore	Pts: Milošević 20; Rebs: Vojvoda, Andrić, Ford 7 Asts: Perry 9 PIR: Milošević 28	Arena: Főnix Hall; Attendance: 1,500; Referees: Z. Pálla, P. Győrffy, P. Praksch, (J. Gincsai)

=== Bronze medal match ===
18 February 2018 Bronze match	Alba Fehérvár	53–67	Atomerőmű SE	Debrecen
15:00 (CET)	Scoring by quarter: 18–17, 12–14, 17–16, 6–20
	Pts: Harris 14; Rebs: Filipovity 9 Asts: Hill 4 PIR: Á. Keller 15	Boxscore	Pts: Guinn 21; Rebs: Eilingsfeld 14; Asts: Ruják 9 PIR: Eilingsfeld, Guinn 28	Arena: Főnix Hall; Attendance: 500; Referees: T. Földházi, L. Pozsonyi, Gy. Balogh, (L. Balogh)

=== Final ===
18 February 2018 Final	Szolnoki Olaj KK	82–67	Falco-Vulcano Energia KC Szombathely	Debrecen
17:30 (CET)	Scoring by quarter: 25–18, 21–16, 15–13, 21–19
	Pts: Vojvoda 21; Rebs: Ford 10; Asts: Perry 5 PIR: Vojvoda 28	Boxscore	Pts: Borisov 14; Rebs: Tóth 7 Asts: Govens 5 PIR: Govens, Borisov, Tóth 16	Arena: Főnix Hall; Attendance: 4,200; Referees: P. Papp, Cs. Cziffra, T. Benczur, (M. Faidt)

Starters:			Pts	Reb	Ast
PG	3	(United States) Kendrick Perry	15	5	1
SG	9	(Hungary) Dávid Vojvoda	21	5	2
SF	12	(United States) Quincy Ford	9	10	1
F	24	(Serbia) Strahinja Milošević	14	8	4
C	4	(Croatia) Lukša Andrić	6	6	1
Reserves:					
SF	2	(United States) Steven Browning	8	2	2
C	15	(Hungary) Ádám Tóth	8	3	0
SG	10	(Hungary) Péter Kovács	0	0	0
F	7	(Hungary) Gábor Rudner	DNP		
C	5	(United States) Samuel Taiwo	DNP		
PG	11	(Hungary) Zoltán Tóth	DNP		
PG	6	(Hungary) Zoltán Polyák	DNP		
Head coach:
(Serbia) Dragan Aleksić

Szolnoki Olaj	Falco KC

Hungarian Cup MVP
Dávid Vojvoda
Game rules
Game played under FIBA rules.

2018 Magyar Kupa Winners
Szolnoki Olaj
7th title

Starters:			Pts	Reb	Ast
PG	40	(United States) Darrin Govens	11	4	5
SG	23	(United States) Julian Norfleet	10	4	3
G	10	(Hungary) Benedek Váradi	7	6	1
SF	15	(Montenegro) Miloš Borisov	14	3	1
C	13	(Hungary) Norbert Tóth	10	7	0
Reserves:					
SG	9	(Hungary) Zoltán Perl	3	0	4
C	14	(United States) Steve Taylor	12	6	0
SF	7	(Hungary) Krisztofer Durázi	DNP		
SG	12	(Hungary) Patrik Hódi	DNP		
PG	5	(Hungary) Bence Kovács	DNP		
PG	27	(Hungary) András Dancsecs	DNP		
PF	34	(Belarus) Aliaksandr Pustahvar	DNP		
Head coach:
(Serbia) Srećko Sekulović

== See also ==
- 2017–18 Nemzeti Bajnokság I/A
