= 2018–19 Nemzeti Bajnokság I/A (men's basketball) =

Nemzeti Bajnokság I/A
- Season: 2018–19
- Dates: September 28, 2018 – June 21, 2019
- Games played: 182 (regular season)
- Teams: 14
- TV partner: M4 Sport

Finals
- Champions: Falco-Vulcano KC Szombathely (2nd title)
- Runners-up: EGIS Körmend
- Semifinalists: Pécsi VSK-Veolia; Szolnoki Olaj KK

Statistical leaders
Points	(United States) Damier Pitts	20.00
Rebounds	(United States) Wesley Gordon	10.27
Assists	(Serbia) Marko Boltić	7.54
Index Rating	(United States) Kammron Taylor	28.35

The 2018–19 Nemzeti Bajnokság I/A (in English: National Championship I/A) was the 88th season of the Nemzeti Bajnokság I/A, the highest professional basketball league in Hungary. Szolnoki Olaj was the defending champion.

The season ended on 21 June 2019, when Falco Vulcano won its second national championship after sweeping Egis Körmend in the finals.

== Teams ==
Location of teams in 2018–19 Nemzeti Bajnokság I/A

The following 14 clubs compete in the NB I/A during the 2018–19 season. TF Budapest was promoted to this season as champions from the Hungarian 2018–19 NB I/B. MAFC left the league.

=== Arenas and locations ===
Team	City	Hall	Capacity
Alba Fehérvár	Székesfehérvár	Vodafone Sportcsarnok	1,850
Atomerőmű SE	Paks	ASE Sportcsarnok	1,500
DEAC	Debrecen	Oláh Gábor utcai Sportcsarnok	1,200
Falco KC Szombathely	Szombathely	Arena Savaria	3,070
Jászberényi KSE	Jászberény	Bercsényi Tornacsarnok	1,070
Kaposvári KK	Kaposvár	Városi Sportcsarnok	990
Kecskeméti TE	Kecskemét	Messzi István Sportcsarnok	1,900
BC Körmend	Körmend	Körmend Aréna	2,002
Pécsi VSK	Pécs	Lauber Dezső Sportcsarnok	3,548
Sopron KC	Sopron	Novomatic Aréna	2,000
SZTE-Szedeák	Szeged	Újszegedi Sportcsarnok	3,017
Szolnoki Olaj KK	Szolnok	Tiszaligeti Sportcsarnok	2,122
Tehetséges Fiatalok	Budapest	Ludovika Aréna	1,500
Zalaegerszegi TE	Zalaegerszeg	Városi Sportcsarnok	2,816

=== Personnel and kits ===
Team	Head coach	Team captain	Kit manufacturer	Shirt sponsor
Alba Fehérvár	(Serbia) Branislav Džunić	(Hungary) Péter Lóránt	Spalding	tippmix^{1}, Hungrana, Huawei
Atomerőmű SE	(Croatia) Teo Čizmić	(Hungary) Máté Medve	adidas	tippmix^{1}, MVM Atomerőmű
Debreceni EAC	(Hungary) Sándor Berényi		adidas	tippmix^{1}
Falco KC Szombathely	(Slovenia) Gašper Okorn	(Hungary) Norbert Tóth	Zeus	tippmix^{1}, Vulcano energia, Autófókusz
Jászberényi KSE	(Serbia) Nikola Lazić	(Hungary) György Cseh	Spalding	tippmix^{1}, Mercedes-Benz, Jász-Plasztik
Kaposvári KK	(Hungary) Ádám Fekete	(Hungary) Roland Hendlein	Spalding	tippmix^{1}, SEAT
Kecskeméti TE	(Hungary) Gábor Forray	(Hungary) Gergely Hegedűs	Kipsta	UltraTech, Duna Aszfalt, tippmix^{1}
BC Körmend	(Slovenia) Gašper Potočnik	(Hungary) Csaba Ferencz	Spalding	tippmix^{1}, EGIS
PVSK-Panthers	(Hungary) Ferenc Csirke	(Croatia) Veljko Budimir	McNut	tippmix^{1}, Veolia, GP Consulting, Terra21
TF-Budapest	(Bosnia and Herzegovina) Merim Mehmedović	(Hungary) Gábor Beák	Toti Sport	tippmix^{1}
Soproni KC	(Hungary) Kornél Váradi		Peak	tippmix^{1}
SZTE-Szedeák	(Serbia) Anđelko Mandić	(Serbia) Andrija Ćirić	Toti Sport	tippmix^{1}, Naturtex, Continental
Szolnoki Olaj	(Serbia) Dragan Aleksić	(Hungary) Dávid Vojvoda	Nike	MOL
Zalaegerszeg	(Hungary) Tamás Bencze	(Hungary) Máté Mohácsi	adidas	Zalakerámia, tippmix^{1}, HunGast

== Regular season ==
=== League table ===
Pos	Team	Pld	W	L	PF	PA	PD	Pts	Qualification
1	Szolnoki Olaj KK	26	20	6	2294	2054	+240	46	Qualification for 1st–5th placement matches
2	Egis Körmend	26	20	6	2218	1997	+221	46	Qualification for 1st–5th placement matches
3	Falco-Vulcano KC Szombathely	26	17	9	2099	1958	+141	43	Qualification for 1st–5th placement matches
4	JP Auto-JKSE	26	17	9	2017	1985	+32	43	Qualification for 1st–5th placement matches
5	Pécsi VSK-VEOLIA	26	14	12	2080	2015	+65	40	Qualification for 1st–5th placement matches
6	KTE-Duna Aszfalt	26	13	13	2059	2071	−12	39	Qualification for 6th–10th placement matches
7	DEAC	26	13	13	2224	2271	−47	39	Qualification for 6th–10th placement matches
8	Atomerőmű SE	26	12	14	2129	2091	+38	38	Qualification for 6th–10th placement matches
9	Zalakerámia ZTE KK	26	12	14	2170	2209	−39	38	Qualification for 6th–10th placement matches
10	Soproni KC	26	12	14	2132	2114	+18	38	Qualification for 6th–10th placement matches
11	Alba Fehérvár	26	12	14	2054	2035	+19	38	Qualification for 11th–14th placement matches
12	Kaposvári KK	26	11	15	2121	2116	+5	37	Qualification for 11th–14th placement matches
13	Naturtex-SZTE-Szedeák	26	7	19	1929	2075	−146	33	Qualification for 11th–14th placement matches
14	Serco TF-BP	26	2	24	1792	2327	−535	28	Qualification for 11th–14th placement matches

Source: Kosarsport.hu
Rules for classification: 1) Games played; 2) Points; 3) Wins; 4) Defeats; 5) Points for; 6) Points against; 7) Victories/Defeats series; 8) in Home games; 9) as a Guest; 10) Last 5 matches.

=== Results ===
Home \ Away	ALB	ATO	DEA	FAL	JAS	KAP	KTE	KOR	SZE	PVS	TFB	SOP	SZO	ZTE
Alba Fehérvár	—	74–88	92–82	80–75	74–79	87–83	81–75	88–59	97–68	71–88	113–51	65–87	63–73	89–84
Atomerőmű	74–57	—	85–76	75–82	71–72	83–81	81–75	73–86	87–94	84–75	105–64	105–85	63–76	93–81
DEAC	91–78	88–92	—	95–88	73–80	80–65	89–86	82–78	83–71	74–58	74–70	104–97	96–90	91–72
Falco KC Szombathely	72–70	83–72	103–96	—	78–58	79–60	74–71	68–76	75–67	68–53	91–48	75–74	78–77	88–75
Jászberényi KSE	81–82	91–90	92–82	73–67	—	91–70	81–63	88–90	85–68	95–94	73–67	83–74	80–79	71–69
Kaposvár	89–67	88–77	103–79	90–84	90–75	—	78–79	87–92	63–82	89–72	100–61	90–67	91–98	84–69
Kecskemétt TE	94–79	83–80	95–81	80–95	67–72	104–102	—	88–85	83–78	84–82	78–68	73–72	70–71	97–91
BC Körmend	83–65	86–73	113–82	92–88	90–72	88–66	80–79	—	93–84	86–77	123–60	95–78	104–72	96–86
SZTE-Szedeák	68–78	63–64	88–82	77–85	74–82	81–73	85–68	62–83	—	78–86	90–85	96–89	69–92	75–85
Pécsi VSK-Veolia	78–73	85–68	93–89	57–65	79–55	82–67	85–78	97–80	85–76	—	76–77	83–75	83–78	83–92
TF Budapest	78–102	69–93	69–81	65–93	70–84	79–81	64–86	70–77	60–57	53–85	—	87–92	72–86	62–87
Soproni KC	70–80	77–67	102–85	86–77	78–67	79–57	72–73	80–79	74–62	83–74	108–83	—	82–81	93–99
Szolnoki Olaj KK	76–66	94–77	99–75	88–68	76–71	96–78	80–74	95–79	64–58	104–75	109–97	83–74	—	85–79
Zalakerámia ZTE	89–83	99–98	112–114	75–88	70–66	85–96	64–56	83–94	74–57	73–95	83–63	91–84	75–96	—

Source: Kosarsport.hu
Legend: Blue = home team win; Red = away team win.

== Second round ==
=== 1st – 5th Placement matches ===
Pos	Team	Pld	W	L	PF	PA	PD	Pts	Qualification
1	Egis Körmend	34	25	9	2975	2703	+272	59	Advance to playoffs
2	Falco-Vulcano KC Szombathely	34	24	10	2814	2539	+275	58	Advance to playoffs
3	Szolnoki Olaj KK	34	23	11	2853	2682	+171	57	Advance to playoffs
4	Pécsi VSK-VEOLIA	34	18	16	2727	2663	+64	52	Advance to playoffs
5	JP Auto-JKSE	34	18	16	2573	2657	−84	52	Advance to playoffs

First match(es) will be played: unknown. Source: Kosarsport.hu
Rules for classification: 1) Games played; 2) Points; 3) Wins; 4) Defeats; 5) Points for; 6) Points against; 7) Victories/Defeats series; 8) in Home games; 9) as a Guest; 10) Last 5 matches.

==== Results ====
Home \ Away	KOR	FAL	JAS	PVS	SZO
Egis Körmend	—	95–88	83–59	84–70	88–68
Falco-Vulcano KC Szombathely	94–70	—	91–60	88–53	96–71
JP Auto-JKSE	84–92	57–78	—	82–84	90–82
Pécsi VSK-Veolia	98–85	91–95	77–56	—	108–87
Szolnoki Olaj KK	88–84	84–85	85–68	71–66	—

Updated to match(es) played on 17 May 2019. Source: Kosarsport.hu
Legend: Blue = home team win; Red = away team win.

=== 6th – 10th Placement matches ===
Pos	Team	Pld	W	L	PF	PA	PD	Pts	Qualification
6	Atomerőmű SE	34	17	17	2897	2781	+116	51	Advance to playoffs
7	KTE-Duna Aszfalt	34	17	17	2707	2768	−61	51	Advance to playoffs
8	Soproni KC	34	17	17	2847	2835	+12	51	Advance to playoffs
9	DEAC	34	17	17	2908	2946	−38	51	
10	Zalakerámia ZTE KK	34	14	20	2857	2927	−70	48	

First match(es) will be played: unknown. Source: Kosarsport.hu
Rules for classification: 1) Games played; 2) Points; 3) Wins; 4) Defeats; 5) Points for; 6) Points against; 7) Victories/Defeats series; 8) in Home games; 9) as a Guest; 10) Last 5 matches.

==== Results ====
Home \ Away	ATO	DEA	KTE	SOP	ZTE
Atomerőmű SE	—	118–80	92–69	101–83	100–86
DEAC	84–72	—	72–77	81–91	100–79
KTE-Duna Aszfalt	83–81	55–82	—	96–105	98–95
Soproni KC	112–119	82–99	83–79	—	70–66
Zalakerámia ZTE KK	93–85	101–86	87–91	80–89	—

Updated to match(es) played on 17 May 2019. Source: Kosarsport.hu
Legend: Blue = home team win; Red = away team win.

=== 11th – 14th Placement matches ===
Pos	Team	Pld	W	L	PF	PA	PD	Pts	Qualification
11	Alba Fehérvár	32	15	17	2518	2483	+35	47	
12	Kaposvári KK	32	13	19	2596	2605	−9	45	
13	Naturtex-SZTE-Szedeák	32	11	21	2378	2499	−121	43	Qualification for play-out
14	Serco TF-BP	32	5	27	2251	2813	−562	37	Qualification for play-out

Source: Kosarsport.hu
Rules for classification: 1) Games played; 2) Points; 3) Wins; 4) Defeats; 5) Points for; 6) Points against; 7) Victories/Defeats series; 8) in Home games; 9) as a Guest; 10) Last 5 matches.

==== Results ====
Home \ Away	ALB	KAP	SZE	TFB
Alba Fehérvár	—	79–68	64–70	91–76
Kaposvári KK	89–97	—	86–69	86–81
Naturtex-SZTE-Szedeák	75–68	71–66	—	97–66
Serco TF-BP	70–65	92–80	74–67	—

Source: Kosarsport.hu
Legend: Blue = home team win; Red = away team win.

== Playoffs ==
Teams in bold won the playoff series. Numbers to the left of each team indicate the team's original playoff seeding. Numbers to the right indicate the score of each playoff game.

Quarter-finals
1	**Egis Körmend**	3
8	Sopron	0
4	**Pécsi VSK-Veolia**	3
5	JP Auto-JKSE	0
2	**Falco-Vulcano Szombathely**	3
7	KTE-Duna Aszfalt	0
3	**Szolnoki Olaj**	3
6	Atomerőmű	0

Semi-finals
1	**Egis Körmend**	3
4	Pécsi VSK-Veolia	2
2	**Falco-Vulcano Szombathely**	3
3	Szolnoki Olaj	0

Finals
1	Egis Körmend	0
2	**Falco-Vulcano Szombathely**	3
Third place
3	Szolnoki Olaj	0
4	**Pécsi VSK-Veolia**	2

=== Quarter-finals ===
In the quarterfinals, teams playing against each other had to win three games to win the series. Thus, if one team wins three games before all five games have been played, the games that remain are omitted. The team that finished in the higher regular season place, played the first, third and the fifth (if it was necessary) games of the series at home.

Team 1	Series	Team 2	Game 1	Game 2	Game 3	Game 4	Game 5
**Egis Körmend**	3–0	Soproni KC	104–72	90–89	78–56	—	—
**Falco-Vulcano Szombathely**	3–0	KTE-Duna Aszfalt	102–60	85–56	97–64	—	—
**Szolnoki Olaj KK**	3–0	Atomerőmű SE	83–80	103–97	92–87	—	—
**Pécsi VSK-Veolia**	3–0	JP Auto-JKSE	77–73	76–68	88–76	—	—

=== Semi-finals ===
In the semifinals, teams playing against each other had to win three games to win the series. Thus, if one team wins three games before all five games have been played, the games that remain are omitted. The team that finished in the higher regular season place, played the first, third and the fifth (if it was necessary) games of the series at home.

Team 1	Series	Team 2	Game 1	Game 2	Game 3	Game 4	Game 5
**Egis Körmend**	3–2	Pécsi VSK-Veolia	88–75	83–77	72–87	68–64	97–71
**Falco-Vulcano Szombathely**	3–0	Szolnoki Olaj KK	78–65	87–71	102–75	—	—

=== Finals ===
In the finals, teams playing against each other had to win three games to win the title. Thus, if one team won three games before all five games were played, the remaining games were omitted. The team that finished in the higher regular season place, played the first, the third, and the fifth (if it was necessary) games of the series at home.

Team 1	Series	Team 2	Game 1	Game 2	Game 3	Game 4	Game 5
Egis Körmend	0–3	**Falco-Vulcano Szombathely**	70–77	77–87	89–96	—	—

==== Game 1 ====
15 June 2019	Egis Körmend	70–**77** (Series: **0–1**)	**Falco-Vulcano Energia KC Szombathely**	Körmend
15:30 (CEST)	Scoring by quarter: 18–**21**, **22**–16, 15–**24**, 15–**16**
	Pts: Hammonds 18; Rebs: Hammonds 8 PIR: Hammonds 23	Report	Pts: Govens 15; Rebs: Bruinsma, Reddic 9 PIR: Govens 21	Arena: Városi Sportcsarnok; Attendance: 2,002; Referees: T. Földházy, G. Kapitány, R. Török, (J. Nagy)

==== Game 2 ====
18 June 2019	**Falco-Vulcano Energia KC Szombathely**	**87**–77 (Series: **2–0**)	Egis Körmend	Szombathely
18:30 (CEST)	Scoring by quarter: **29**–19, 13–**16**, **32**–13, 13–**29**
	Pts: Bruinsma 32; Rebs: Váradi, Bruinsma 9 PIR: Bruinsma 38	Report	Pts: Thames 20; Rebs: Hammonds 9 PIR: Thames 28	Arena: Arena Savaria; Attendance: 3,070; Referees: T. Benczur, P. Praksch, P. Győrrfy, (A. Bernáth)

==== Game 3 ====
21 June 2019	Egis Körmend	89–**96** (Series: **0–3**)	**Falco-Vulcano Energia KC Szombathely**	Körmend
18:30 (CEST)	Scoring by quarter: 28–**30**, **22**–15, 14–**18**, 25–**33**
	Pts: Bradford 27; Rebs: Hammonds 6 PIR: Bradford 33	Report	Pts: Perl 18; Rebs: Bruinsma 7 PIR: Bruinsma, Reddic 22	Arena: Városi Sportcsarnok; Attendance: 2,002; Referees: Cs. Cziffra, P. Papp, L. Goda, (P. Gencsev)

=== Third place ===
In the series for the third place, teams playing against each other had to win two games to win the 3rd place in the final rankings of the season. Thus, if one team won two games before all three games had been played, the remaining games were omitted. The team that finished in the higher regular season place, played the first and the third (if it was necessary) games of the series at home.

Team 1	Series	Team 2	Game 1	Game 2	Game 3
Szolnoki Olaj KK	0–2	Pécsi VSK-Veolia	68–106	96–77	—

== Playout ==
Higher ranked team hosted Game 1 plus Game 3 if necessary. The lower ranked hosted Game 2.

Team 1	Series	Team 2	Game 1	Game 2	Game 3
Naturtex-SZTE-Szedeák	2–0	Serco TF-BP	81–73	78–77	

== Final standings ==
Pos	Team	Pld	W	L	Qualification
1	Falco (C)	43	33	10	Qualification for Champions League qualifying rounds
2	Körmend	45	31	14	Qualification for FIBA Europe Cup
3	PVSK Panthers	42	23	19	Qualification for FIBA Europe Cup
4	Szolnoki Olaj	41	25	16	
5	JP Auto-JKSE	37	18	19	
6	Atomerőmű SE	37	17	20	
7	KTE	37	17	20	
8	Soproni KC	37	17	20	
9	DEAC	34	17	17	
10	ZTE	34	14	20	
11	Alba Fehérvár	32	15	17	
12	Kaposvári	32	13	19	
13	SZTE-Szedeák (O)	24	11	13	
14	TF Budapest (R)	32	5	27	Relegation to NB I/B

First match(es) will be played: unknown. Source: Kosarsport.hu
(C) Champions; (O) Play-off winners; (R) Relegated

== Season statistics ==
=== Individual statistics ===
As of 28 June 2019.

==== Points ====
Rank	Name	Team	PPG
1.	(United States) Damier Pitts	JP Auto-JKSE	20.00
2.	(Montenegro) Miloš Borisov	DEAC	19.71
3.	(United States) Donte Clark	Serco TF-BP	19.50
4.	(United States) Angelo Warner	Sopron KC	19.35
5.	(United States) Kammron Taylor	Pécsi VSK-Veolia	18.58

==== Rebounds ====
Rank	Name	Team	RPG
1.	(United States) Wesley Gordon	Sopron KC	10.27
2.	(Denmark) Jonas Zohore	Serco TF-BP	9.63
3.	(Hungary) Roland Hendlein	Kaposvári KK	9.19
4.	(Hungary) Kemal Karahodžić	KTE-Duna Aszfalt	8.46
5.	(Serbia) Đorđe Pantelić	JP Auto-JKSE	8.44

==== Valuation ====
Rank	Name	Team	VPG
1.	(United States) Kammron Taylor	Pécsi VSK-Veolia	28.35
2.	(United States) Wesley Gordon	Sopron KC	27.88
3.	(United States) Angelo Warner	Sopron KC	26.15
4.	(Montenegro) Miloš Borisov	DEAC	25.04
5.	(Ukraine) Andriy Agafonov	Zalakerámia ZTE KK	24.42

==== Assists ====
Rank	Name	Team	APG
1.	(Serbia) Marko Boltić	Naturtex-SZTE-Szedeák	7.54
2.	(United States) Henry Dugat	DEAC	6.00
3.	(United States) Damier Pitts	JP Auto-JKSE	5.90
4.	(Hungary) Ákos Kovács	Atomerőmű SE	5.89
5.	(Puerto Rico) Emmanuel Ubilla	Kaposvári KK	5.71

=== Number of teams by counties ===
Pos.	County (megye)	No. of teams	Teams
1	Jász-Nagykun-Szolnok	2	Jászberényi KSE and Szolnoki Olaj
1	Vas	2	Falco KC and BC Körmend
2	Baranya	1	PVSK Panthers
2	Bács-Kiskun	1	Kecskeméti TE
2	Budapest (capital)	2	MAFC and Vasas
2	Csongrád	1	SZTE-Szedeák
2	Hajdú-Bihar	1	DEAC
2	Fejér	1	Alba Fehérvár
2	Győr-Moson-Sopron	1	Sopron KC
2	Somogy	1	Kaposvári KK
2	Tolna	1	Atomerőmű SE
2	Zala	1	Zalaegerszegi TE

== Hungarian clubs in European competitions ==
Club	Competition	Progress
Szolnoki Olaj	Champions League	First qualifying round
Szolnoki Olaj	FIBA Europe Cup	Second round
Alba Fehérvár	FIBA Europe Cup	Quarter-finals
Falco Szombathely	FIBA Europe Cup	Regular season

== Hungarian clubs in regional competitions ==
Team	Competition	Progress
Egis Kormend	Alpe Adria Cup	Champions
ZTE	Alpe Adria Cup	Quarterfinals

== See also ==
- 2019 Magyar Kupa
