= Mike Pollio =

American basketball coach (born 1943)

Biographical details
- Born: May 12, 1943 (age 83)

Coaching career (HC unless noted)
- 1975–1980: Old Dominion (assistant)
- 1980–1985: Kentucky Wesleyan
- 1985–1989: VCU
- 1989–1992: Eastern Kentucky

Administrative career (AD unless noted)
- c. 1983: Kentucky Wesleyan
- 2002–2010: Mid-South Conference (commissioner)

Head coaching record
- Overall: 233–105
- Tournaments: 2–1 (NIT); 13–4 (NCAA Division II)

Accomplishments and honors

Championships
- 3 GLVC regular season (1983–1985)

Mike Pollio (born May 12, 1943) is an American former basketball coach and college athletics administrator.

== Early life and education ==
Pollio was born May 12, 1943. He graduated from Bellarmine College in 1965 with a Bachelor of Arts degree.

== Career ==
After graduating, he was Paul Webb's assistant coach at Old Dominion University for five years.

He was the head men's basketball coach at Kentucky Wesleyan College from 1980 to 1985. Afterwards, Pollio had a choice of accepting a coaching position at James Madison University, ODU, or Virginia Commonwealth University (VCU). He ultimately chose VCU because his longtime friend Lewis Mills was athletic director there. He coached at VCU from 1985 to 1989.

=== Eastern Kentucky University ===
He was head coach at Eastern Kentucky University from 1989 to 1992, compiling a career college basketball coaching record of 233–105. Under Pollio, the Panthers moved from last place to second place in the Great Lakes Valley Conference men's basketball tournament. At Kentucky Wesleyan, he also served as athletic director, reviving the Kentucky Wesleyan Panthers football program in 1983 after a 53-year hiatus. He was inducted into the Kentucky Wesleyan Hall of Fame in 2014.

=== Mid-South Conference ===
From 2002 until June 2010, he was the commissioner of the Mid-South Conference. During Pollio's tenure as commissioner, the conference expanded from nine members to fourteen members, allowing it to receive two automatic bids to the NAIA football national championship. The conference also established the MSC Radio Network and signed an agreement with Wazoo Sports Network to broadcast games on television and the internet.

== Head coaching record ==
Record table
Season	Team	Overall	Conference	Standing	Postseason
Kentucky Wesleyan Panthers (Great Lakes Valley Conference) (1980–1985)
1980–81	Kentucky Wesleyan	16–12	7–4	2nd	
1981–82	Kentucky Wesleyan	27–5	9–3	2nd	NCAA Division II Third Place
1982–83	Kentucky Wesleyan	22–8	10–2	1st	NCAA Division II Sweet 16
1983–84	Kentucky Wesleyan	28–3	10–2	1st	NCAA Division II Third Place
1984–85	Kentucky Wesleyan	24–7	10–4	T–1st	NCAA Division II Third Place
Kentucky Wesleyan:		117–35	46–15		
VCU Rams (Sun Belt Conference) (1985–1989)
1985–86	VCU	12–16	6–8	5th	
1986–87	VCU	17–14	7–7	4th	
1987–88	VCU	23–12	10–4	2nd	NIT quarterfinal
1988–89	VCU	13–15	9–5	3rd	
VCU:		65–57	32–24		
Eastern Kentucky Colonels (Ohio Valley Conference) (1989–1992)
1989–90	Eastern Kentucky	13–17	7–5	4th	
1990–91	Eastern Kentucky	19–10	9–3	2nd	
1991–92	Eastern Kentucky	19–14	9–5	2nd	
Eastern Kentucky:		51–42	25–13		
Total:		233–105			
National champion Postseason invitational champion Conference regular season champion Conference regular season and conference tournament champion Division regular season champion Division regular season and conference tournament champion Conference tournament champion
