= Stevie Browning =

American basketball player and coach

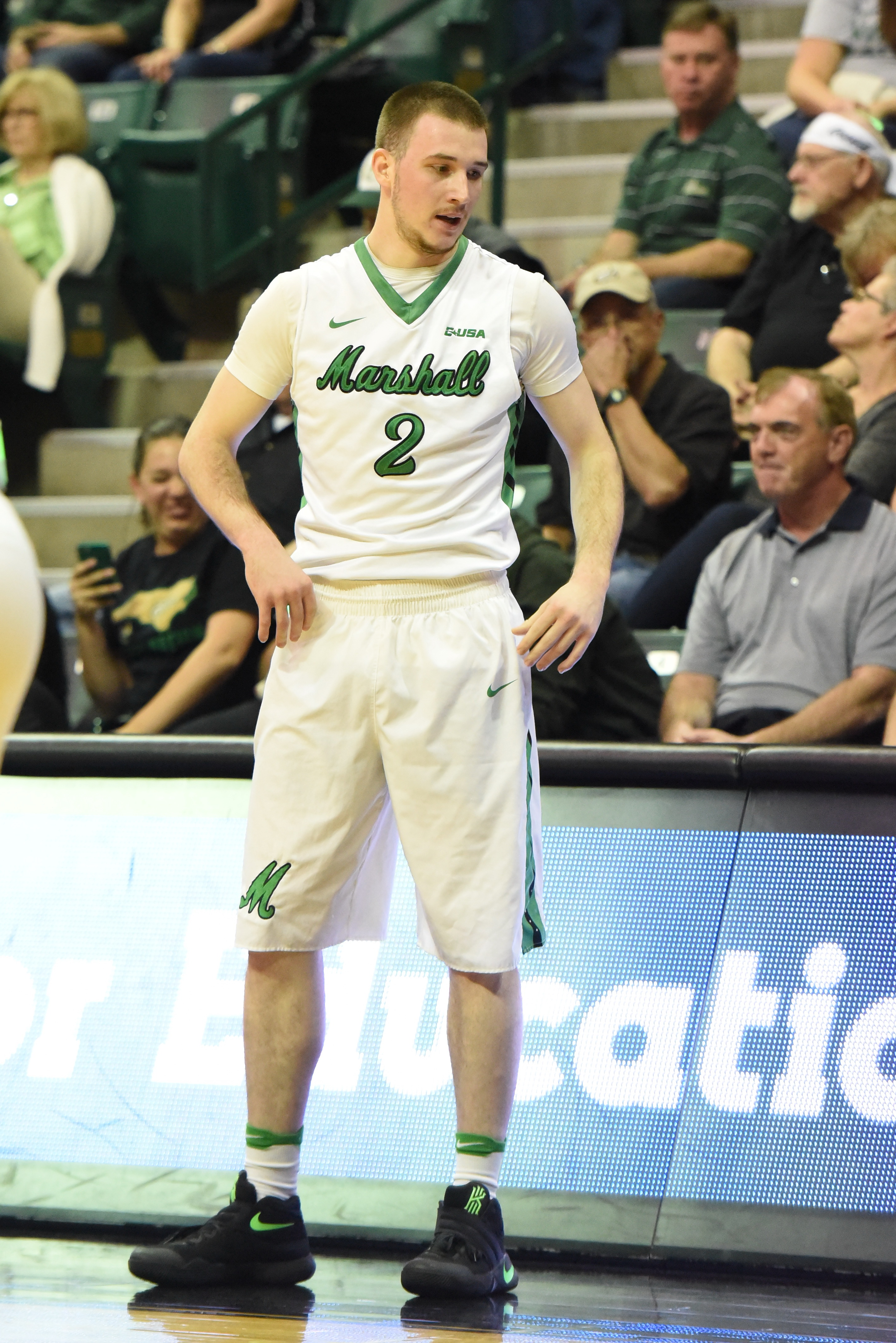
- Browning playing for Marshall

Personal information
- Born: November 30, 1993 (age 32) Pensacola, Florida, U.S.
- Listed height: 6 ft 3 in (1.91 m)
- Listed weight: 190 lb (86 kg)

Career information
- High school: Logan (Logan, West Virginia)
- College: Fairmont State (2012–2014); Marshall (2015–2017)
- NBA draft: 2017: undrafted
- Playing career: 2017–2021
- Position: Point guard

Career history

Playing
- 2017–2018: Trabzonspor
- 2018: Szolnoki Olaj
- 2018–2019: Kolossos Rodou
- 2019–2020: Inter Bratislava
- 2021: Ovarense Basquetebol

Coaching
- 2020–2021: Marshall (graduate assistant)

Career highlights
- Hungarian League champion (2018); Hungarian Cup (2018); Second-team All-MEC (2014)

Steven Edward Browning (born November 30, 1993) is an American former professional basketball player. He played college basketball for Fairmont State and Marshall before playing in several professional leagues in Europe.

== Early life and high school ==
Browning was born in Pensacola, Florida, raised in Logan, West Virginia and attended Logan High School. While at Logan Browning helped lead the Wildcats to the state playoffs three times and to the state title. As a senior he averaged 25.2 points per game and was named first team All-State.

== College career ==
=== Fairmont State ===
Browning began his collegiate career at Fairmont State. He appeared in all 32 of the Fighting Falcons' games as a freshman, averaging 6.9 points per game, and led the team in scoring as a sophomore, averaging 16.8 and 5.7 rebounds and was named second team All-MEC (2014). Following his sophomore season, Browning announced that he would be transferring to Marshall University.

=== Marshall ===
After sitting out one season due to NCAA transfer rules, Browning played two seasons for Marshall. As a redshirt junior, Browning averaged 12.8 points, 4.5 rebounds and 3.6 assists. In his redshirt senior season, he was the Thundering Herd's second-leading scorer at 16.1 points per game. He was named to the 2017 Conference USA all-tournament team after averaging 19.5 points, 5.8 rebounds and 5.0 assists a game. Browning completed his collegiate career with 1,694 total points scored, 726 at Fairmont State and 968 at Marshall.

== Professional career ==
=== Trabzonspor B.K. ===
Browning signed with Trabzonspor B.K. of the Turkish Basketball Super League (BSL) on July 21, 2017. He only appeared in one BSL game and two FIBA Europe Cup games before leaving the team.

=== Szolnoki Olaj KK ===
Browning then signed with Szolnoki Olaj KK of the Hungarian Nemzeti Bajnokság I/A (NB I/A). He averaged 9 points, 1.5 assists and 3.1 rebounds in 25 games (8 starts) as Szolnoki won the NB I/A title and the 2018 Hungarian Cup. After the season he played for the West Virginia Wildcats in The Basketball tournament.

=== Kolossos Rodou ===
Browning signed with Kolossos Rodou B.C. of Greek Basket League (GBL) on July 11, 2018. Browning played in 26 GBL games, starting 17, and averaged 12.5 points, 3.4 rebounds and 2.4 assists per game as Kolossos finished last in the league with a 5–21 record.

=== Inter Bratislava ===
Browning signed with Inter Bratislava of the Slovak Extraliga on September 12, 2019.

=== Ovarense Basquetebol ===
After originally retiring from professional basketball in 2020, Browning decided to resume his playing career and signed with Ovarense Basquetebol of the Liga Portuguesa de Basquetebol on August 9, 2021.

== The Basketball Tournament ==
Browning joined Herd That, a team composed primarily of Marshall alumni, in The Basketball Tournament 2020. He returned to Herd That for The Basketball Tournament 2021.

== Coaching career ==
Browning retired from professional basketball in 2020 to accept a position as a graduate assistant at Marshall. Browning left Marshall's coaching staff following the 2020–21 after deciding to continue his professional playing career. He later served as Logan High School's interim head coach during summer practices following the previous head coach's retirement.
