= Stefan Balmazović =

Serbian basketball player

KK Beko
- Position: Small forward
- League: Second League of Serbia

Personal information
- Born: May 28, 1989 (age 37) Ivanjica, SFR Yugoslavia
- Listed height: 1.99 m (6 ft 6 in)
- Listed weight: 98 kg (216 lb)

Career information
- NBA draft: 2011: undrafted
- Playing career: 2007–present

Career history
- 2007: Crvena zvezda
- 2007–2009: Vizura
- 2009–2010: Mega Vizura
- 2010–2013: Metalac Valjevo
- 2013–2014: Radnički Kragujevac
- 2014–2015: Vršac
- 2015–2016: ZTE KK
- 2016: Mladost Zemun
- 2016–2017: Start Lublin
- 2017–2018: Turów Zgorzelec
- 2018–2019: Falco Szombathely
- 2019–2020: SZTE-Szedeák
- 2020–2021: Rabotnički
- 2021–2022: Borac Zemun
- 2022: Rabotnički
- 2022–present: Borac Zemun
- 2022–2023: Borac Zemun
- 2023: Euro Nikel
- 2023–present: Beko Beograd

Career highlights
- Hungarian League champion (2019); Serbian League Cup winner (2022)

Stefan Balmazović (born May 28, 1989) is a Serbian professional basketball player for Beko Beograd of the Second Basketball League of Serbia.

== Professional career ==
Balmazović started his professional career with Crvena zvezda in 2007, only to move to Vizura for the 2007–08 season, where he stayed for two seasons, before joining the fusion team Mega Vizura for additional 2009–10 season.

For the 2010–11 season, he signed with Metalac Valjevo and stayed with them for three seasons.

Balmazović joined Borac Zemun of the Second Basketball League of Serbia in 2021, and averaged 18 points, 4.9 rebounds, 1.9 assists and 1.8 steals per game. On March 1, 2022, he signed with Rabotnički.
