= Justin Tillman =

American basketball player

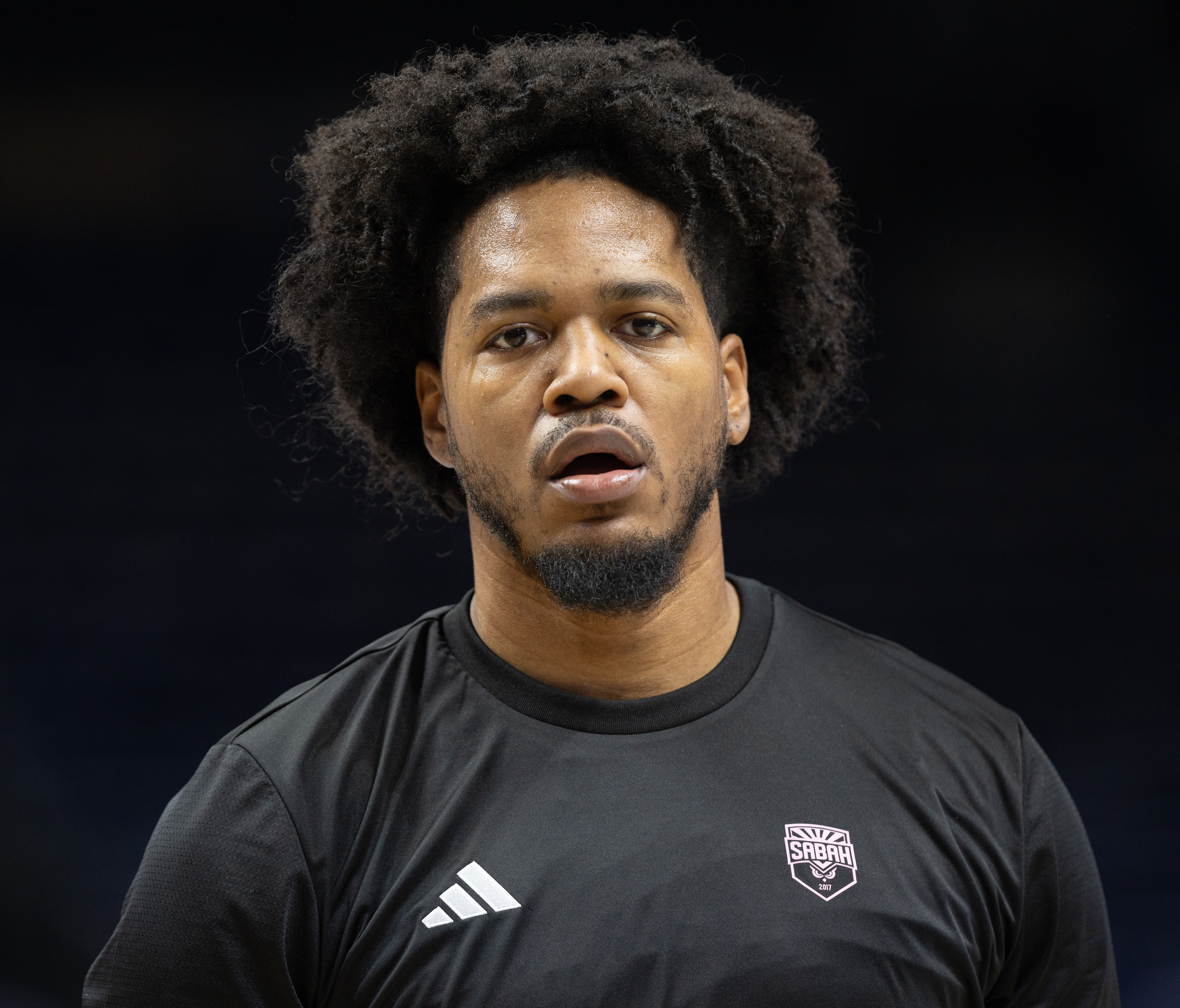
- Tillman with Sabah in 2025

No. 2 – Maccabi Rishon LeZion
- Position: Center / power forward
- League: Israeli Basketball Premier League

Personal information
- Born: February 2, 1996 (age 30) Detroit, Michigan, U.S.
- Listed height: 6 ft 8 in (2.03 m)
- Listed weight: 225 lb (102 kg)

Career information
- High school: Pershing (Detroit, Michigan)
- College: VCU (2014–2018)
- NBA draft: 2018: undrafted
- Playing career: 2018–present

Career history
- 2018: Wonju DB Promy
- 2019: Memphis Hustle
- 2019–2020: Hapoel Gilboa Galil
- 2020–2021: Dinamo Sassari
- 2021: Bursaspor
- 2021: Hapoel Tel Aviv
- 2021–2022: College Park Skyhawks
- 2022: Gigantes de Carolina
- 2022: Grand Rapids Gold
- 2022–2023: Zhejiang Golden Bulls
- 2023: Hapoel Haifa
- 2023–2024: AEK Athens
- 2024–2025: Nanterre 92
- 2025–2026: Sabah
- 2026–present: Maccabi Rishon LeZion

Career highlights
- All-NBA G League First Team (2022); First-team All-Atlantic 10 (2018); Third-team All-Atlantic 10 (2017); Atlantic 10 All-Defensive Team (2018)
- Stats at NBA.com
- Stats at Basketball Reference

Justin Earl Tillman (born February 2, 1996) is an American professional basketball player for Maccabi Rishon LeZion of the Israeli Basketball Premier League. He played college basketball for the VCU Rams.

== Early life and college career ==
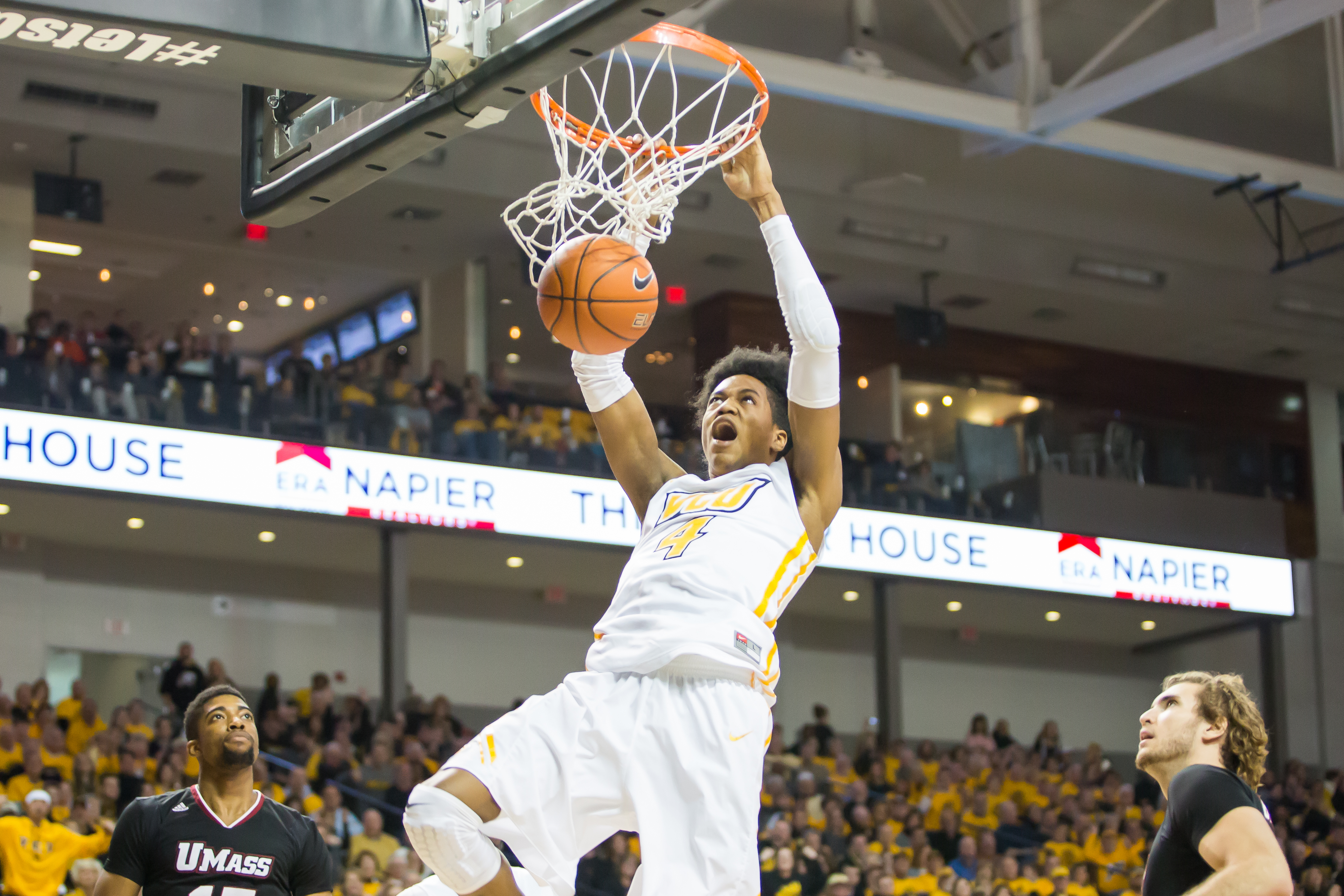
Tillman playing for VCU

Tillman attended Pershing High School in Detroit, Michigan, where he averaged 23 points, 16 rebounds, 3 assists and 4.5 blocks during his senior season.

Tillman played four years of college basketball at Virginia Commonwealth University, where he averaged 18.9 points, 9.9 rebounds and 1.0 blocks per game in his senior year. Tillman finished as the Rams' third-leading rebounder (922) and tenth-leading shot blocker (102) of all time. On March 6, 2018, Tillman earned a spot in the All-Atlantic 10 First Team, All-Defensive Team and All-Championship Team.

== Professional career ==
=== Wonju DB Promy (2018) ===
After going undrafted in the 2018 NBA draft, Tillman joined the Miami Heat for the 2018 NBA Summer League.

On July 26, 2018, Tillman started his professional career with the Wonju DB Promy of the Korean Basketball League. On November 4, 2018, Tillman recorded a career-high 46 points, shooting 18-of-24 from the field, along with 13 rebounds in an 89–74 win over the Goyang Orion Orions. Tillman started in all 11 games for Wonju Dongbu Promy, averaging 25.5 points and 11.7 rebounds in 30.4 minutes per game.

=== Memphis Hustle (2019) ===
On January 21, 2019, Tillman was acquired by the Memphis Hustle, the NBA G League affiliate of the Memphis Grizzlies. In 8 games played for the Hustle, he averaged 8.7 points, 5.1 rebounds and 1 assist in 18.1 minutes per game.

=== Hapoel Gilboa Galil (2019–2020) ===
On July 3, 2019, Tillman joined the Phoenix Suns for the 2019 NBA Summer League.

On July 28, 2019, Tillman signed a one-year deal with Hapoel Gilboa Galil of the Israeli Premier League. On October 7, 2019, Tillman recorded a double-double of 26 points and 11 rebounds in his debut, shooting 13-of-17 from the field in a 100–73 blowout win over Hapoel Be'er Sheva. On November 1, 2019, Tillman was named Israeli League Player of the Month after averaging a double-double of 24.3 points and 14.7 rebounds for 31.3 PIR in three games played in October. On December 1, 2019, Tillman recorded a double-double of 10 rebounds and a season-high 34 points, while shooting 13-of-26 from the field, in a 115–106 double overtime win over Ironi Nes Ziona. Two days later, he was named co-Israeli League Round 8 MVP, alongside his teammate Jarmar Gulley.

=== Dinamo Sassari (2020–2021) ===
On June 24, 2020, Tillman signed a one-year contract with Dinamo Sassari in the Italian Serie A and FIBA Basketball Champions League.

=== Bursaspor (2021) ===
On January 10, 2021, Tillman signed with Frutti Extra Bursaspor of the Turkish Super League (BSL).

=== Hapoel Tel Aviv (2021) ===
On February 19, 2021, Tillman signed with Hapoel Tel Aviv B.C. of the Israeli Basketball Premier League.

=== College Park Skyhawks (2021–2022) ===
In October 2021, Tillman signed with the College Park Skyhawks. On December 28, 2021, Tillman signed a 10-day contract with the Atlanta Hawks, but never appeared in a game for the team. On January 3, 2022, Tillman was reacquired by the College Park Skyhawks of the NBA G League.

=== Gigantes de Carolina (2022) ===
On April 17, 2022, Tillman signed with the Gigantes de Carolina of the BSN.

=== Grand Rapids Gold (2022) ===
On November 4, 2022, Tillman was named to the opening night roster for the Grand Rapids Gold.

=== Hapoel Haifa (2023) ===
On February 3, 2023, Tillman signed with Hapoel Haifa, making his return to the Israeli Premier League. He made his debut with the team on February 19, 2023, where he put up 12 points, and grabbed 6 rebounds, in a 70–78 loss to Hapoel Galil Elyon.

=== AEK Athens (2023–2024) ===
On August 14, 2023, he signed a one-year contract with AEK Athens of the Greek Basket League.

=== Nanterre 92 (2024–2025) ===
On August 27, 2024, he signed with Nanterre 92 of the LNB Pro A.

=== Sabah BC (2025–2026) ===
On August 11, 2025, he signed with Sabah BC of the Azerbaijan Basketball League.
