= VCU Rams men's basketball =

Men's basketball team that represents Virginia Commonwealth University

2026–27 VCU Rams men's basketball team
- University: Virginia Commonwealth University
- First season: 1968–69; 58 years ago
- Head coach: Phil Martelli Jr. (2nd season)
- Location: Richmond, Virginia
- Arena: E. J. Wade Arena at the Siegel Center ("The Stu") (capacity: 7,637, expandable to 8,000)
- Conference: Atlantic 10
- Nickname: Rams
- Colors: Black and gold
- Student section: The Rowdy Rams
- All-time record: 1,083–565 (.657)

NCAA Division I tournament Final Four
- 2011
Other NCAA Division I tournament results
Elite Eight	2011
Sweet Sixteen	2011
Appearances	1980, 1981, 1983, 1984, 1985, 1996, 2004, 2007, 2009, 2011, 2012, 2013, 2014, 2015, 2016, 2017, 2019, 2021*, 2023, 2025, 2026

Conference tournament champions
- 1980, 1981, 1985, 1996, 2004, 2007, 2009, 2012, 2015, 2023, 2025, 2026

Conference regular-season champions
- 1981, 1983, 1984, 1985, 1996, 2004, 2007, 2008, 2009, 2016, 2019, 2023, 2025, 2026

Uniforms
Home	Away
- * Forfeit due to positive COVID-19 tests

The VCU Rams men's basketball team is the intercollegiate men's basketball team that represents Virginia Commonwealth University. The Rams joined the Atlantic 10 Conference in the 2012–13 season after previously competing in the Colonial Athletic Association (CAA). The team is currently coached by Phil Martelli Jr.

Since 1999, the team has played home basketball games at the E.J. Wade Arena at the Stuart C. Siegel Center in Richmond, Virginia on the university's Monroe Park campus. Virginia Commonwealth has made it to the NCAA Final Four once in its program's history, in 2011. Additionally, the Rams won the 2010 CBI tournament and have won twelve conference tournaments; three being in the Sun Belt Conference, five being in the Colonial Athletic Association, and four in the Atlantic 10 Conference. The Rams have also won fourteen regular season championships; four in the Sun Belt, five in the CAA, and five in the Atlantic 10. The official student supporter group is known as the Rowdy Rams.

The team is known for its Final Four run in the 2011 NCAA Division I men's basketball tournament. While the team had made nine NCAA tournament appearances beforehand, never had the Rams made it beyond the second round of the tournament. In 2011, the Rams' journey to the Final Four began in one of the four opening round games, commonly called "play-in" games, intended to narrow the field from 68 to 64 teams. Thus, VCU became the first team to advance from the "First Four" to the Final Four.

In another NCAA tournament-first, VCU became the first team ever to forfeit a game in the NCAA tournament when their First Round game in the 2021 NCAA tournament was declared a no-contest due to several positive COVID-19 tests in the VCU program.

VCU reached the NCAA tournament a state record seven consecutive times from 2011 to 2017. (Note: Tied with the Virginia Cavaliers' run of seven consecutive times from 2014 to 2021.)

== History ==
The VCU Rams men's basketball program was founded in 1968, at the same time as the merger of the Richmond Professional Institute and the Medical College of Virginia. In the 1968–69 season as an independent team, the program played its first ever season. The Rams were coached by Benny Dees and assisted by Landy Watson and Vann Brackin for their first two seasons, Dees led the team to two winning records, before being replaced by Chuck Noe. It would take ten more seasons before the Rams appeared in a postseason tournament, earning a berth into the 1978 National Invitation Tournament being eliminated in the first round by University of Detroit Mercy.

Under the coaching of J.D. Barnett, the Rams earned fourth berths into the NCAA tournament, each being their first four berths, the first coming in 1980. During Barnett's six years coaching the team, only twice did the Rams not win the Sun Belt Conference.

The Rams became the first team to sweep the best of three championship series in the College Basketball Invitational post-season tournament on their way to becoming the 2010 CBI champions. It is the first post-season tournament championship, excluding conference tournaments, in the history of the program.

=== The Sun Belt Years ===
VCU received their first bid to the NCAA tournament in the 1979–80 season with an 18–12 overall record and Sun Belt Conference tournament championship led by then first-year head coach J.D. Barnett in VCU's first season in the Sun Belt. They entered the tournament as a No. 12 seed in the East Region and were eliminated in the first round by No. 5 Iowa.

It would not be long before the Rams returned to the tournament. The following year the Rams posted a 24–5 record on their way to the Sun Belt conference regular season and conference tournament championships. The Rams entered the tournament as the No. 5 seed in the East region and defeated No. 12 Long Island before being eliminated by No. 4 Tennessee in overtime in the second round 58–56.

The Rams would return to the tournament in 1983. The Rams, the No. 5 seed in the East region, defeated No. 12 seed La Salle in the first round and were eliminated in the second round by No. 4 seed Georgia 56–54, which was a similar margin to their loss in the 1981 tournament. The 1984 tournament held similar results for the Rams squad. They entered the tournament as a No. 6 seed in the East Region and defeated No. 11 Northeastern before being eliminated by No. 3 Syracuse. The second-round losses in the NCAA tournament by VCU in 1981, 1983, and 1984 were to teams with first-round byes before the tournament expanded to 64 teams for the 1984–85 season and byes were eliminated.

In the 1984–85 season the Rams once again made it to the newly expanded 1985 NCAA tournament. The Rams entered the tournament as the No. 2 seed in the West region, the highest seeding they have ever received in the tournament. The Rams defeated No. 15 Marshall in the first round, but unfortunately their luck had not changed in the second-round and they were upset by No. 7 Alabama 63–59.

During his tenure, head coach J.D. Barnett from 1979 to 1985, led the Rams to five NCAA tournament appearances (1980, 1981, 1983, 1984, and 1985) while capturing four Sun Belt regular season conference championships (1981, 1983, 1984, and 1985) and three Sun Belt Conference tournament championships (1980, 1981, and 1985). He was 132–48 overall and 59–19 in conference play during his time at VCU.

The Rams next stint in the post-season came under head coach Mike Pollio in the 1988 NIT where they would reach the quarterfinals before ultimately falling to Connecticut 69–60. The Rams posted wins over Marshall and Southern Miss in the first and second rounds, respectively.

The Rams remained in the Sun Belt Conference until 1991 when they joined the Metro Conference. VCU was left out of the 1995 merger of the Metro and Great Midwest Conference that created Conference USA. They instead joined the Colonial Athletic Association (CAA) for the 1995–96 season.

=== The CAA Days ===
In their first season as members of the CAA, the Rams posted a 24–9 overall record, going 14–2 in conference play en route to the CAA regular season and conference tournament championships. The Rams earned the right to go dancing in the NCAA tournament for the first time since 1985, but fell in the first round as the No. 12 seed in the Southeast Region to No. 5 Mississippi State.

==== Jeff Capel era ====
The VCU men's basketball team would return to prominence in the 2003–04 season under then second-year head coach Jeff Capel. Following a second place conference finish in his debut season, Capel led the Rams to a 23–8 overall record, going 14–4 in conference play and capturing the CAA regular season and conference tournament championships. In the 2004 NCAA tournament, the Rams were awarded the No. 13 seed in the East region and faced No. 4 Wake Forest in the first round. The Rams led for much of the second half and had a chance to win towards the end despite the Wake Forest comeback, but ultimately fell 79–78.

Jeff Capel originally joined VCU as an assistant in 2001 and at the time of his promotion to the head coaching position in 2002 was the youngest head coach in NCAA Division I basketball at 27 years old. During his time as the head coach with VCU, Capel compiled a 79–41 record. In April 2006, Capel resigned as head coach to accept the same position with Oklahoma. He was replaced by Anthony Grant, formerly an assistant and associate head coach for several years to Billy Donovan, including the 2006 NCAA champions Florida Gators.

==== Anthony Grant era ====
In his first year as head coach, Anthony Grant led the Rams to a school-record 28 wins. The Rams finished the season 28–7, also setting a school and CAA conference record with 16 wins in conference play. Grant, who also set a school record for most wins by a first-year head coach, was named the CAA Coach of the Year. The Rams were 16–2 in conference play and captured the CAA regular season championship before capturing the CAA conference tournament championship in thrilling fashion as Eric Maynor burst onto the national scene by scoring 9 points in the final 1:55 to bury the George Mason Patriots, finishing with 14 of his 20 points in the second half. Maynor also had 7 rebounds, 4 assists and 3 steals in the victory.

The Rams entered the 2007 NCAA tournament as the No. 11 seed in the West Region and upset the No. 6 seed Duke 79–77 on a game-winning bucket from just beyond the free-throw line by Eric Maynor in the final seconds of the game.

The Rams good fortune did not continue into the next round, however, where they were eliminated by the No. 3 seed Pittsburgh Panthers. The Rams squad showed outstanding poise in the second-half by forcing overtime after trailing 41–26 at halftime. They would go on to lose by a score of 84–79.

The next year the Rams would win their second straight CAA regular season championship, posting a 24–8 overall record, 15–3 in conference play, but fall short in the conference tournament in a heartbreaking upset to William & Mary in the semi-finals. The Rams missed an at-large bid for the NCAA tournament but instead received an invitation to play in the NIT. The Rams heartbreak continued as they were upset on their home court in the first round by old-time Sun Belt Conference rival, UAB 80–77 as a late comeback fell just short.

The 2008–09 season was another successful one for the VCU program. The Rams finished the season with a mark of 24–10 overall, going 14–4 in a hotly contested CAA and sealing the deal on a three-peat as CAA regular season champions for only the second time in CAA conference history and the second time in school history, the first coming during the Rams time in the Sun Belt Conference. The Rams would not fall short again and captured the CAA Conference tournament championship for the fourth time since joining the conference capped by a 71–50 rout of rival George Mason in the final. The 21-point margin was the largest margin of victory in a CAA conference tournament championship game. Larry Sanders set CAA conference tournament championship records for the Rams with 20 rebounds and 7 blocks in the victory.

So once again, the Rams headed to the NCAA tournament as a No. 11 seed in the East Region. The Rams were eliminated by the No. 6 seed UCLA Bruins in a hard-fought game 65–64.

Anthony Grant posted an impressive 76–25 record in his three seasons as the head coach at VCU. He was 52–10 versus CAA opponents, including conference tournaments, capturing three straight CAA regular season conference championships and two CAA conference tournament championships. He led VCU to two NCAA tournament berths and one NIT berth before departing the program to take over the head coaching position at Alabama. Eric Maynor would go on to be drafted No. 20 in the 2009 NBA draft by the Utah Jazz.

==== Shaka Smart era ====
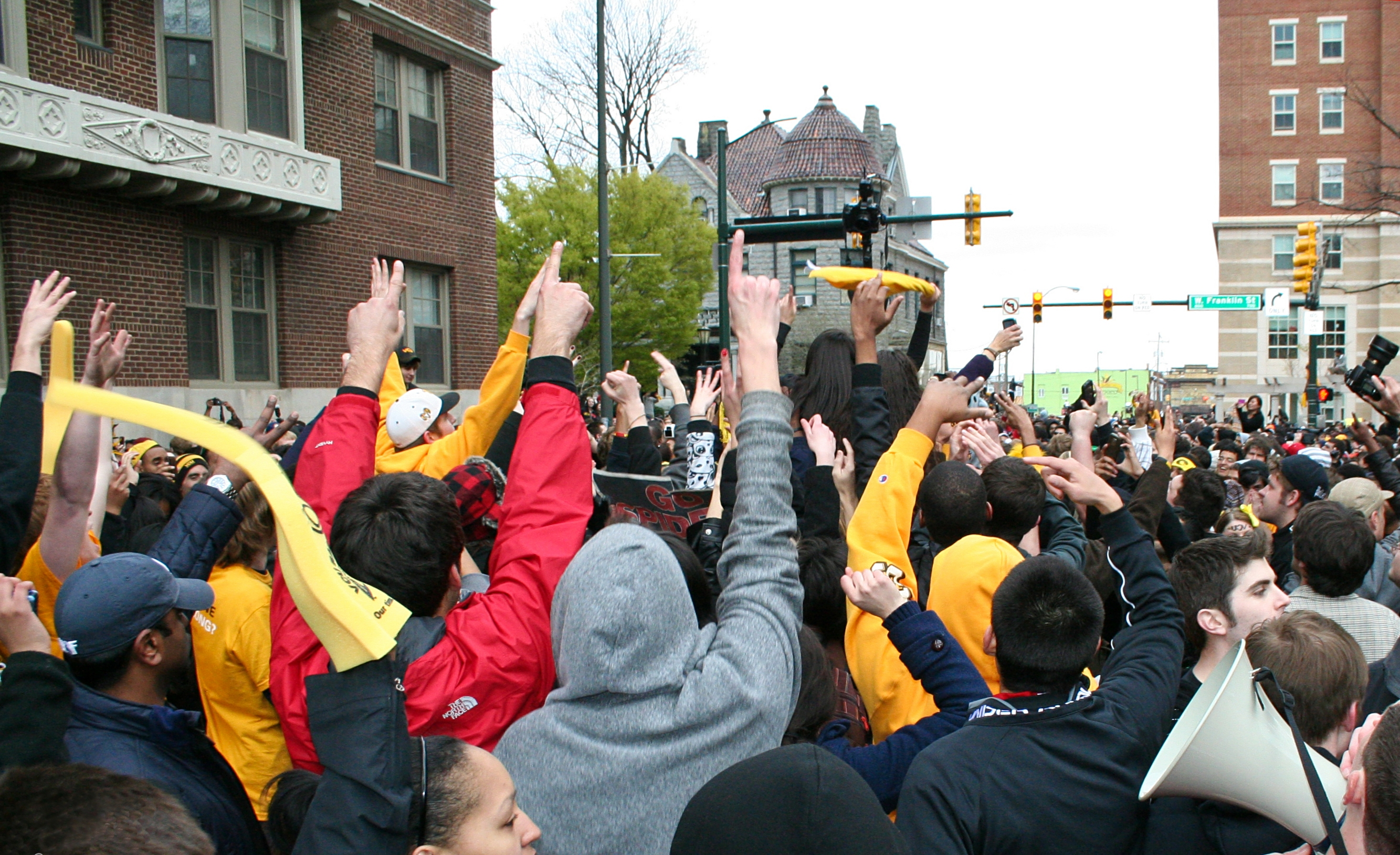
Students celebrate VCU's upset victory over Kansas. The win gave VCU a berth into the Final Four.

From 2009 to 2015, the Rams were led by Shaka Smart, who had been previously an assistant coach for Florida. Prior to Florida, Smart served as an assistant coach at Clemson, Akron and California (Pa.) and a director of operations at Dayton. During his introductory press conference, he promised that his teams would "wreak havoc on our opponents [sic] psyche and their plan of attack." Smart's teams have employed a basketball philosophy nicknamed Havoc since that point.

In Smart's first year as the Rams head coach, the team posted a 27–9 record, going 11–7 in the CAA, finishing fifth in the conference. As fifth seeds, the Rams made it to the semi-finals of the 2010 CAA men's basketball tournament before falling to their conference rivals, Old Dominion, who would go on to win the CAA championship. Despite reaching the semifinals of the CAA Tournament, the Rams did not earn a berth into either the NCAA or NIT tournaments. However, the Rams earned a berth into the 2010 College Basketball Invitational, where they would finish as the eventual champions, defeating Saint Louis 2–0 in the series final. Their sweep of Saint Louis made it the first time in CBI history a team won the best two-out-of-three championship series in two games. Additionally, it was VCU's first postseason tournament, other than the Sun Belt and CAA tournaments, that the program won.

On Selection Sunday 2011, the VCU Rams received an at-large bid to the 2011 NCAA Division I men's basketball tournament to start off the newly created 68-team field. VCU found itself as one of the last teams in the tournament and was scheduled to play in the newly formed "First Four" against USC on March 16 for a spot as the 11th seed in the tournament. The inclusion of VCU in the tournament was widely criticized by pundits and the ESPN network, in particular Jay Bilas and Dick Vitale. In the first round of the NCAA tournament, dubbed by many as "The First Four", The Rams succeeded in knocking off USC by the score of 59–46. The Rams blew out Georgetown 74–56 in Chicago to reach the Round of 32 and followed this win up with a 94–76 rout of third-seeded Purdue to advance to VCU's first-ever Sweet Sixteen appearance. VCU then beat Florida State 72–71 in overtime on a last second shot by Bradford Burgess to advance to the school's first ever Elite Eight appearance.

The Rams upset No. 1 seed Kansas Jayhawks 71–61 to reach the Final Four for the first time ever. VCU, the Southwest Regional champions played in the national semifinal against the Southeast Region champion Butler Bulldogs, losing 70–62. The VCU Rams finished sixth in the ESPN/USA Today Coaches Poll at the end of the season. This was the highest ranking in VCU's history and the highest ranking of any team from the CAA. The 2011 NCAA tournament run by VCU is regarded as one of the best cinderella runs of all time. Their First Four appearance, combined with their run to the Final Four, gave VCU the distinction of being the first team to win five games in the men's NCAA tournament without reaching the championship game.

=== The Atlantic 10 Days ===
The major conference realignment of the early 2010s eventually gave VCU the opportunity for a major basketball upgrade. After A-10 mainstay Temple announced its departure for the Big East Conference and Charlotte announced it would return to Conference USA, the A-10 reloaded by adding Butler (Note: Butler only spent the 2012–13 school year in the A-10 before joining the current Big East.) and VCU. The move placed VCU in a conference that regularly collected NCAA at-large bids—the A10 had 20 teams earn at-large bids from 2000 through 2012, including three in the 2012 tournament. By comparison, the CAA had only four at-large bids in the same period (one of them being VCU's 2011 Final Four team).

On Sunday, March 15, 2015, VCU won its first Atlantic 10 conference tournament championship.

On April 2, 2015, Smart left VCU to become the head coach at Texas.

==== Will Wade era ====
After two seasons at Chattanooga, Will Wade returned to VCU to take the open head coaching position vacated by Shaka Smart. In his first season returning to VCU, Wade guided the team to their first ever A-10 Conference regular season championship and a 25–11 overall record. VCU made it to the championship game of the A-10 conference tournament for the fourth straight season, falling to Saint Joseph's. The team won at least 24 games, a feat they share with Kansas for the last ten seasons. The Rams also made their sixth straight NCAA tournament, one of only eight teams in the country to do so. VCU made it to the Round of 32 where they fell to Oklahoma 85–81. Wade finished second in voting for A-10 Coach Of The Year. Wade announced that he was leaving VCU after two years to accept the head coaching position at Louisiana State University in Baton Rouge.

==== Mike Rhoades era ====
On March 21, 2017, VCU announced that the school had hired former associate head coach under Shaka Smart, Mike Rhoades, as the Rams' new head basketball coach. He was formerly the head coach at Rice in Houston. He is the twelfth coach in program history. On March 29, 2023, Mike Rhoades announced he was accepting an offer to coach at Penn State following six seasons at VCU and no NCAA tournament wins. Hours after his announced departure all key VCU players declared for the transfer portal leaving VCU with just 5 active roster players.

==== Ryan Odom era ====
In March 2023, VCU named Utah State coach Ryan Odom as the Rams new head coach. In his two years at VCU he led the team to a 52–21 record. In Odom's first season, the Rams finished 24–14 and advanced to the 2024 NIT quarterfinals. In the Odom's second season, the Rams won both the Atlantic 10 regular-season and Atlantic 10 tournament championships, winning 18 of their final 20 games en route to a No. 11 seed in the NCAA tournament, where they lost to No. 6 seed Brigham Young in the first round. Odom was named the men's basketball coach for Virginia on March 21, 2025.

==== Phil Martelli Jr. era ====
Three days after Odom left to take the head coaching position at UVA, VCU announced the hiring of Bryant University head coach Phil Martelli Jr. as the program's fifth head coach in ten years. In his first season at the helm, Martelli Jr. led the Rams to a 15–3 conference record, tied for first in the Atlantic 10. The Rams won the 2026 A-10 tournament as the 2 seed (Saint Louis taking the top spot having swept the Rams in conference play) with a 70–62 win over Dayton clinching their 21st appearance in the NCAA tournament. VCU was given the 11 seed in the South Region and upset North Carolina in the first round, overcoming a 19-point deficit in the second half to win 82–78 in overtime. Their tournament run would end at the hands of eventual national semifinalists Illinois in the second round.

== Coaches ==
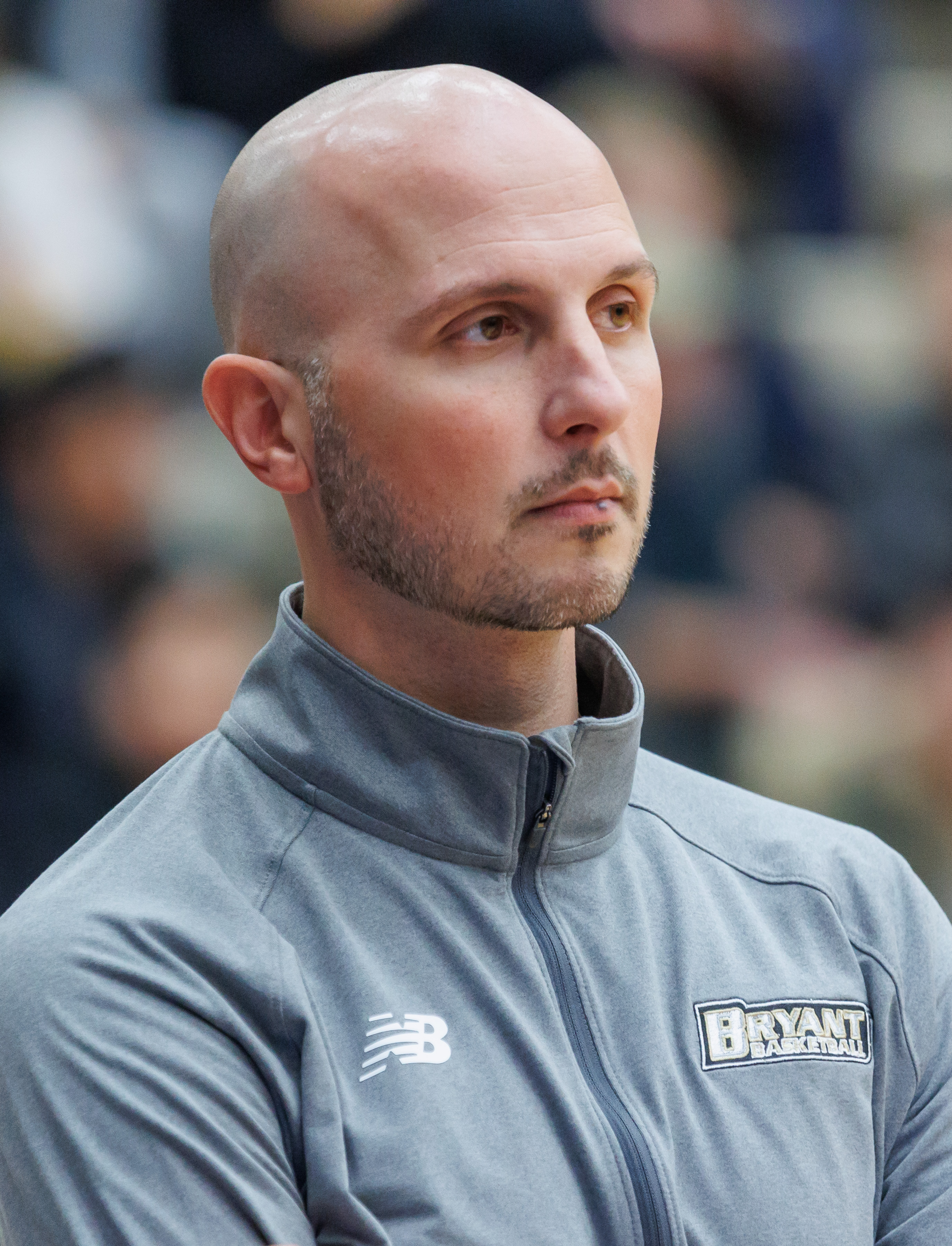
Coach Phil Martelli Jr.

In the team's history, the Rams have had 12 different head coaches. Benny Dees coached the team for the first two seasons of existence. During Dees' tenure, the team achieved winning records both seasons, but barely pulled ahead of .500, resulting in Dees being fired. The second coach, Chuck Noe, led the team for the next six seasons.

Following Noe's departure as head coach in 1976, Dana Kirk became the third head coach in Rams basketball history. Kirk, formerly assistant to Denny Crum, was part of the University of Louisville team that reached the Final Four in 1976. In Kirk's second season with the team, he led them to a 24–5 record, and a berth into the National Invitational Tournament, making it the first time the team reached any major tournament. Although the team was eliminated in the first round, the success of the program Kirk built continued into the following season. Kirk's success with the Rams resulted in him being hired as the head coach at Memphis State (now Memphis) in 1979.

Subsequently, the Rams earned an invitation to play in the Sun Belt Conference and hired J. D. Barnett as their head coach. Barnett, who coached the team from 1979 through 1985, immediately brought NCAA success to the team, earning berths into the NCAA tournament five of the six seasons in his tenure, as well as being the four-time Sun Belt champions. Barnett’s success eventually led to him being offered a contract to coach at Tulsa.

Mike Pollio became the fifth coach in Rams history. The head coach from 1985 until 1989, Pollio had a rather lackluster record with the team. During his four years as coach, Pollio had two seasons with losing records, the first in Rams history. During his four years, Pollio managed to get the team into the NIT quarterfinals.

Since the early 2000s, VCU has gained a reputation as the springboard for multiple successful coaches to be hired by a major program after achieving success with the Rams. The VCU administration has capitalized on this status by requiring schools who sign a VCU coach to play the Rams home and away as a condition of their compensation package. The only team thus far who did not fulfill this clause is Penn State, which elected to pay a $250,000 buyout in lieu of scheduling the Rams after hiring Mike Rhoades in 2023.

Years	Coach	Seasons	Overall record	Conference record
2025–	Phil Martelli Jr.	1	28–7 (.800)	A-10: 15–3 (.833)
2023–2025	Ryan Odom	2	52–21 (.712)	A-10: 26–10 (.722)
2017–2023	Mike Rhoades	6	129–61 (.679)	A-10: 72–32 (.692)
2015–2017	Will Wade	2	51–20 (.718)	A-10: 28–8 (.778)
2009–2015	Shaka Smart	6	163–56 (.744)	CAA/A-10: 74–30 (.712)
2006–2009	Anthony Grant	3	76–25 (.752)	CAA: 45–9 (.833)
2002–2006	Jeff Capel	4	79–41 (.658)	CAA: 50–22 (.694)
1998–2002	Mack McCarthy	4	66–55 (.545)	CAA: 35–31 (.530)
1989–1998	Sonny Smith	9	136–127 (.517)	Sun Belt/Metro/CAA: 59–65 (.476)
1985–1989	Mike Pollio	4	65–57 (.533)	Sun Belt: 32–24 (.571)
1979–1985	J. D. Barnett	6	132–48 (.733)	Sun Belt: 59–19 (.756)
1976–1979	Dana Kirk	3	57–23 (.713)	
1970–1976	Chuck Noe	6	95–42 (.688)	
1968–1970	Benny Dees	2	25–21 (.543)	
Totals	14 Coaches	50	1102–583 (.654)	469–243 (.659)

== Facilities ==
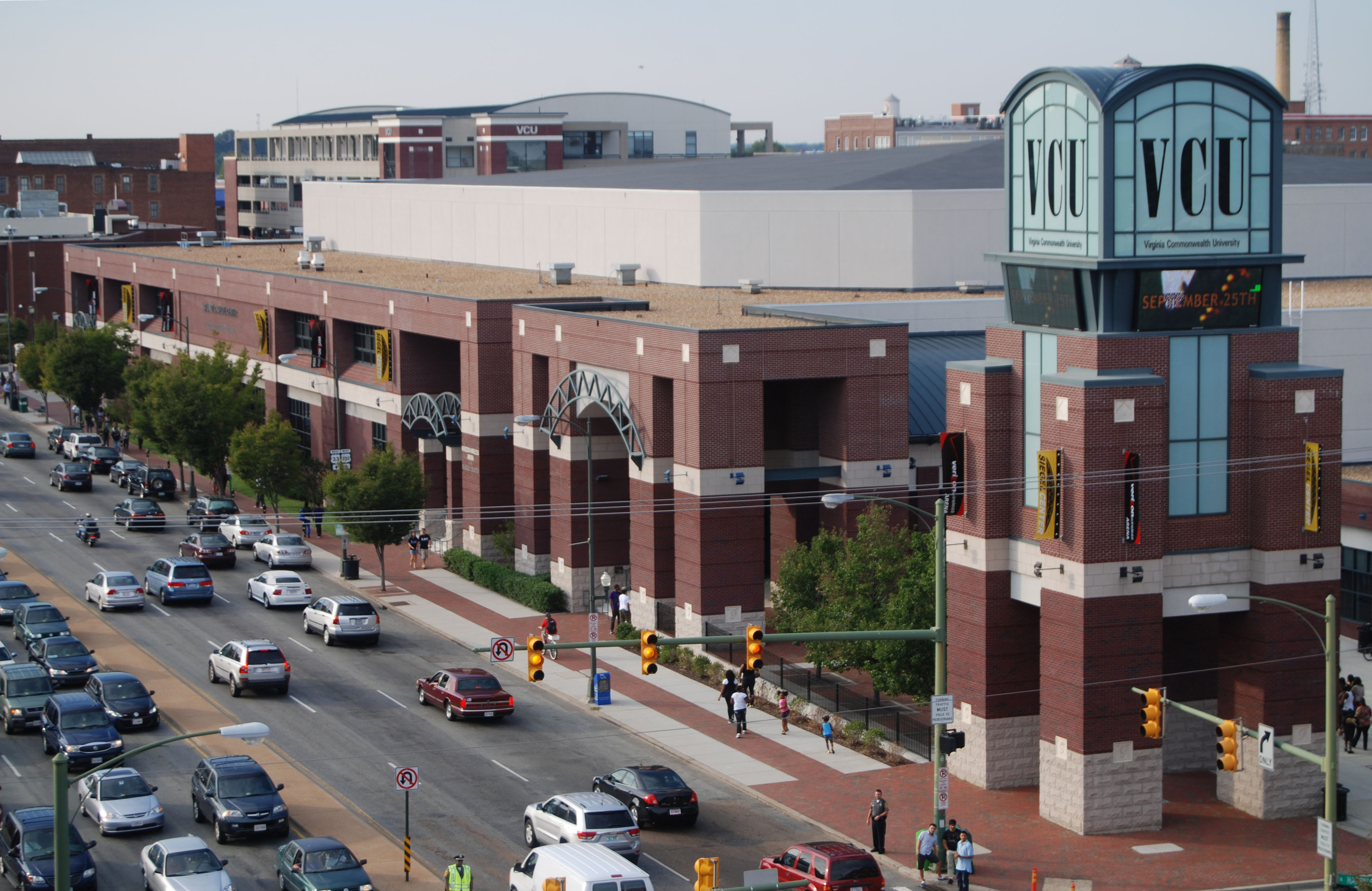
The exterior of the Stuart C. Siegel Center, which has housed the Rams since 1999.

The Rams play at the E.J. Wade Arena, formerly Verizon Wireless Arena, the Stuart C. Siegel Center, located in the northwest corridor of the Monroe Park campus. University-owned, the Siegel Center broke ground for construction April 1996, and opened three years later, in May 1999. Since the 1999–00 season, the venue has been the home arena for the Rams, as well as the women's basketball team and volleyball team.

Prior to the opening of the Siegel Center, the Rams spent a majority of their history playing their home basketball games in the Richmond Coliseum, which housed the team from 1971 until 1999. Prior to the Rams' long-term occupation of the Coliseum, the team played their home games in the Franklin Street Gym.

=== Practice facility ===
A $25 million practice facility located on the north side of Marshall Street adjacent to the Siegel Center was completed in November 2015. Replacing the decades-old Franklin Street Gym, it houses the Men's and Women's basketball teams. The building's size is about 62,000 square feet (5,800 m^{2}) and features courts, players' lounges, dining areas, coaches' offices, retail spaces, and a hall of fame.

== Rivals ==
The Rams have three major rivals: Old Dominion, George Mason and their long-standing crosstown rival University of Richmond.

In the 1970s, their first six games were decided at the buzzer. For the past 35 years, the two schools have competed annually in the Capital City Classic (formerly Black & Blue Classic). The success of the two school's basketball programs was highlighted in the 2011 NCAA tournament, as Richmond and VCU respectively reached the Sweet Sixteen and Final Four.

== Players ==
=== Honored jerseys ===
VCU has honored six players by retiring their jerseys, although the numbers remained active:

VCU Rams retired numbers
No.	Player	Position	Career
3	Eric Maynor	PG	2005–09
2	Brianté Weber	PG	2011–15
5	Calvin Duncan	SG	1981–85
20	Bradford Burgess	SF	2008–12
21	Treveon Graham	SG	2011-15
22	Gerald Henderson	PG	1974–78
23	Kendrick Warren	PF	1990–94

=== Individual career records ===
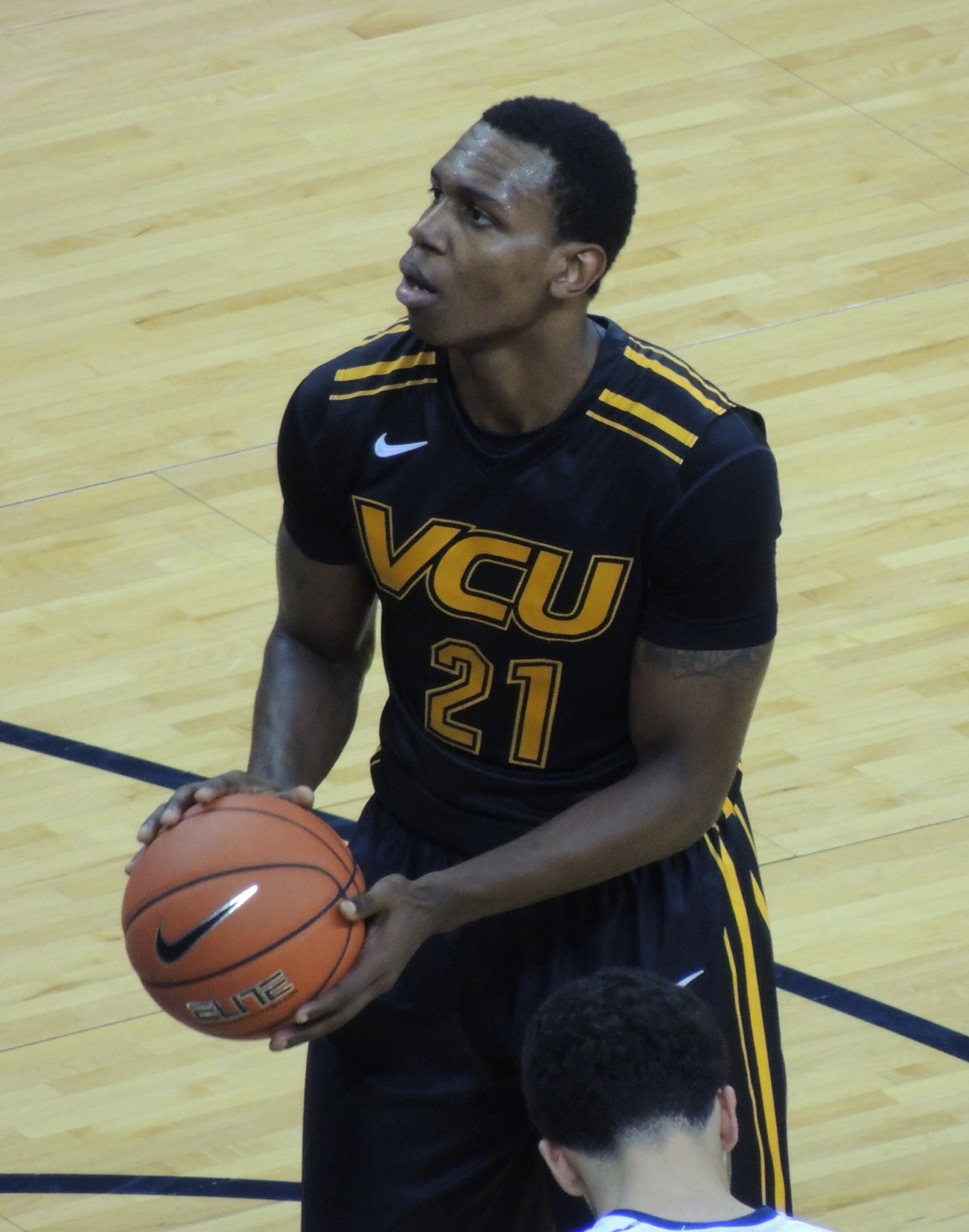
Treveon Graham finished his career with 1,882 points and 803 rebounds.

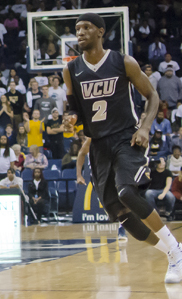
Brianté Weber finished as VCU's all-time steals leader

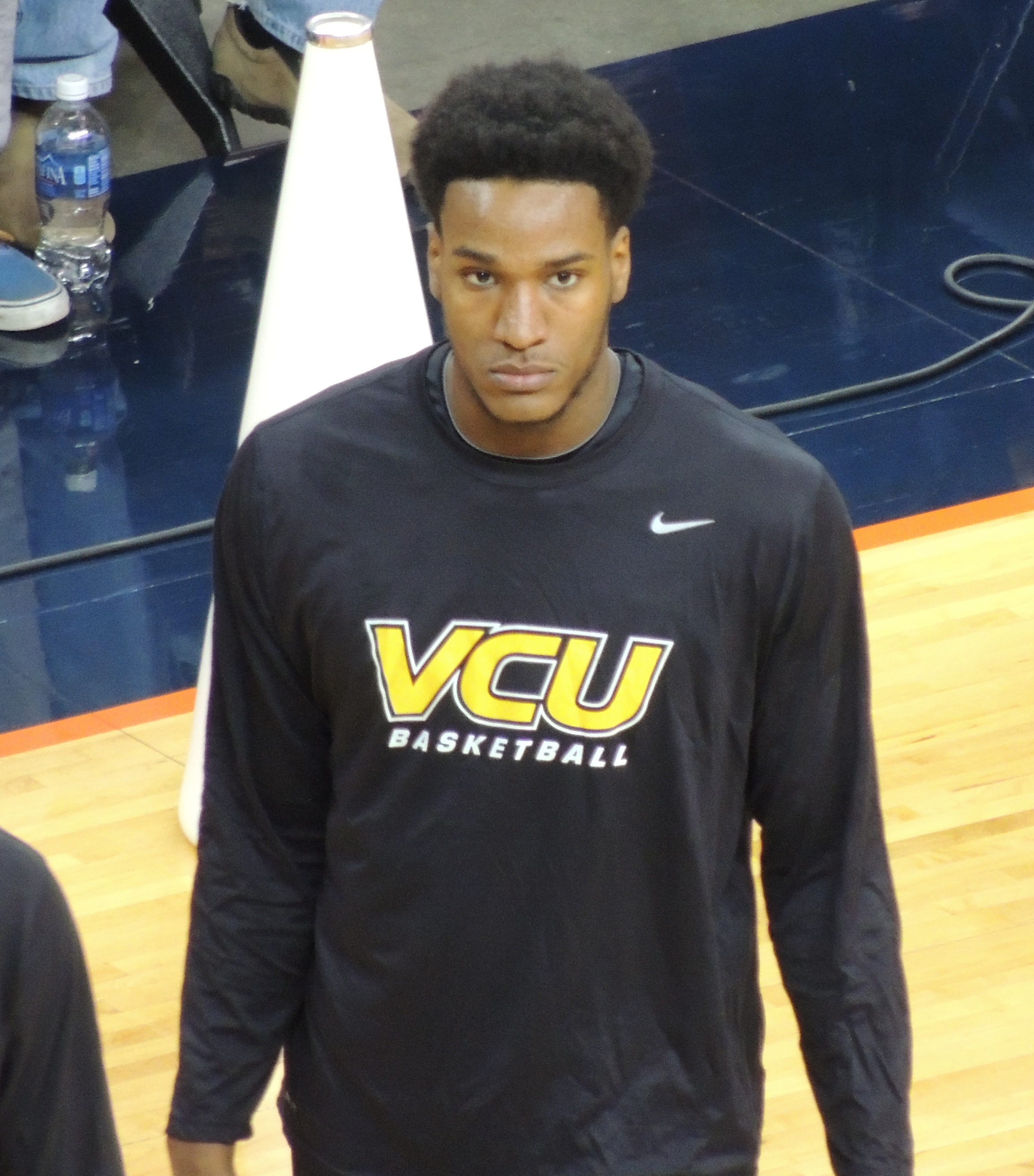
Juvonte Reddic finished among VCU's all-time leaders in rebounds, steals and blocks.

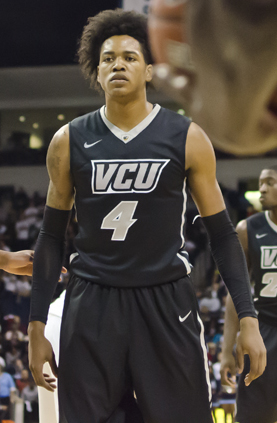
Justin Tillman is in the team's top ten in rebounds and blocked shots.

==== Points ====
1. Eric Maynor – 1,953
2. Treveon Graham – 1,882
3. Kendrick Warren – 1,858
4. Charles Wilkins – 1,716
5. Bradford Burgess – 1,684
6. Melvin Johnson – 1,657
7. Phil Stinnie – 1,645
8. Calvin Duncan – 1,630
9. Domonic Jones – 1,616
10. Jesse Dark – 1,584

==== Rebounds ====
1. Lorenza Watson – 1,143
2. Kendrick Warren – 1,049
3. Justin Tillman – 922
4. Juvonte Reddic – 895
5. Bernard Harris – 839
6. Treveon Graham – 803

==== Assists ====
1. Eric Maynor – 674
2. Ed Sherod – 582
3. Joey Rodriguez – 580
4. Rolando Lamb – 550
5. LaMar Taylor – 527
6. JeQuan Lewis – 505
7. Darius Theus – 462
8. Dave Edwards – 430
9. Sherman Hamilton – 417
10. Calvin Duncan – 404

==== Steals ====
1. Brianté Weber – 374 *
2. Rolando Lamb – 257
3. Joey Rodriguez – 237
4. Darius Theus – 237
5. JeQuan Lewis – 205
6. Ed Sherod – 202
7. LaMar Taylor – 193
8. Eric Maynor – 168
9. Juvonte Reddic – 160
10. Rob Brandenberg – 159

==== Blocked shots ====
1. Lorenza Watson – 391
2. Larry Sanders – 277
3. Mo Alie-Cox – 255
4. L. F. Likcholitov – 207
5. Kendrick Warren – 193
6. Sherron Mills – 134
7. Juvonte Reddic – 123
8. Kenny Stancell – 117
9. George Byrd – 116
10. Justin Tillman – 102

=== Players in the NBA ===
VCU players in NBA
Name	VCU Year(s)	Drafted by	Pro Year(s)
Jesse Dark	1970–74	New York Knicks	1974–75
Bernie Harris	1970–74	Buffalo Braves	1974–75
Gerald Henderson	1974–78	San Antonio Spurs	1979–92
Ed Sherod	1978–82	New Jersey Nets	1982–83
Marc Jackson	1993–94	Golden State Warriors	2000–07
Eric Maynor	2005–09	Utah Jazz	2009–14
Larry Sanders	2007–10	Milwaukee Bucks	2010–15, 2016–17
Troy Daniels	2009–13	Undrafted	2013–20
Brianté Weber	2011–15	Undrafted	2015–18
Treveon Graham	2011–15	Undrafted	2016–20
Bones Hyland	2019–21	Denver Nuggets	2021–
Vince Williams Jr.	2018–22	Memphis Grizzlies	2022–

=== Players in international leagues ===
- Marcus Evans (born 1996) plays for the Bristol Flyers in the British Basketball League
- Juvonte Reddic (born 1992), basketball player in the Israeli Basketball Premier League
- Justin Tillman (born 1996), basketball player for Hapoel Tel Aviv in the Israeli Basketball Premier League
- Marcus Santos-Silva (born 1997), basketball player for Lille Métropole BC in the Pro B, the 2nd-tier level men's professional basketball league in France

=== Other notable players ===
- Mo Alie-Cox currently plays tight end for the NFL's Indianapolis Colts.

== Results by season ==
Most recent:

Record table
Season	Coach	Overall	Conference	Standing	Postseason
2008–09	Anthony Grant	24–10	14–4	1st	NCAA First Round
2009–10	Shaka Smart	27–9	11–7	5th	CBI Champions
2010–11	Shaka Smart	28–12	12–6	4th	NCAA Final Four
2011–12	Shaka Smart	29–7	15–3	2nd	NCAA Third Round
2012–13	Shaka Smart	27–9	12–4	2nd	NCAA Third Round
2013–14	Shaka Smart	26–9	12–4	2nd	NCAA Second Round
2014–15	Shaka Smart	26–10	12–6	T–4th	NCAA First Round
2015–16	Will Wade	25–11	14–4	T–1st	NCAA Second Round
2016–17	Will Wade	26–9	14–4	2nd	NCAA First Round
2017–18	Mike Rhoades	17–14	9–9	5th	None
2018–19	Mike Rhoades	25–8	16–2	1st	NCAA First Round
2019–20	Mike Rhoades	18-13	8–10	7th	— (Note: Due to the COVID-19 pandemic, the 2020 A-10 tournament was cancelled after the second round and the 2020 NCAA tournament was cancelled entirely.)
2020–21	Mike Rhoades	19–7	10–4	4th	NCAA First Round
2021–22	Mike Rhoades	22–10	14–4	2nd	NIT Second Round
2022–23	Mike Rhoades	27–8	15–3	1st	NCAA First Round
2023–24	Ryan Odom	24–14	11–7	T–4th	NIT Quarterfinals
2024–25	Ryan Odom	28–6	15–3	T–1st	NCAA First Round
2025–26	Phil Martelli Jr.	28–7	15–3	T–1st	NCAA Second Round
Total:		1,084–565			
National champion Postseason invitational champion Conference regular season champion Conference regular season and conference tournament champion Division regular season champion Division regular season and conference tournament champion Conference tournament champion

== Postseason ==
=== NCAA tournament results ===
The Rams have appeared in 21 NCAA tournaments. VCU's combined record is 14–20 (with one no-contest).

Year	Record	Seed	Region	Round	Opponent	Result
1980	18–12	#12	East	First Round	#5 Iowa	L 72–86
1981	24–5	#5	East	First Round; Second Round	#12 Long Island #4 Tennessee	W 85–69; L 56–58 ^{OT}
1983	24–7	#5	East	First Round; Second Round	#12 La Salle #4 Georgia	W 76–67; L 54–56
1984	23–7	#6	East	First Round; Second Round	#11 Northeastern #3 Syracuse	W 70–69; L 63–78
1985	26–6	#2	West	First Round; Second Round	#15 Marshall #7 Alabama	W 81–65; L 59–63
1996	24–9	#12	Southeast	First Round	#5 Mississippi State	L 51–58
2004	23–8	#13	East	First Round	#4 Wake Forest	L 78–79
2007	28–7	#11	West	First Round; Second Round	#6 Duke #3 Pittsburgh	W 79–77; L 79–84 ^{OT}
2009	24–10	#11	East	First Round	#6 UCLA	L 64–65
2011	28–12	#11	Southwest	First Four; Second Round; Third Round; Sweet Sixteen; Elite Eight; Final Four	#11 USC #6 Georgetown #3 Purdue #10 Florida State #1 Kansas #8 Butler	W 59–46; W 74–56; W 94–76; W 72–71 ^{OT} W 71–61; L 62–70
2012	29–7	#12	Midwest	Second Round; Third Round	#5 Wichita State #4 Indiana	W 62–59; L 61–63
2013	27–9	#5	South	Second Round; Third Round	#12 Akron #4 Michigan	W 88–42; L 53–78
2014	26–9	#5	South	Second Round	#12 Stephen F. Austin	L 75–77 ^{OT}
2015	26–9	#7	West	Second Round	#10 Ohio State	L 72–75 ^{OT}
2016	25–11	#10	West	First Round; Second Round	#7 Oregon State #2 Oklahoma	W 75–67; L 81–85
2017	26–9	#10	West	First Round	#7 Saint Mary's	L 77–85
2019	25–7	#8	East	First Round	#9 UCF	L 58–73
2021	19–7	#10	West	First Round	#7 Oregon	No-contest^
2023	27–7	#12	West	First Round	#5 Saint Mary's	L 51–63
2025	28–6	#11	East	First Round	#6 BYU	L 71–80
2026	28–7	#11	South	First Round; Second Round	#6 North Carolina #3 Illinois	W 82–78 ^{OT} L 55–76

^Oregon advanced due to positive COVID-19 tests in VCU's program

=== NCAA tournament seeding history ===
The NCAA began seeding the tournament with the 1979 edition.

Years	'80	'81	'83	'84	'85	'96	'04	'07	'09	'11	'12	'13	'14	'15	'16	'17	'19	'21	'23	'25	'26
Seeds →	12	5	5	6	2	12	13	11	11	11	12	5	5	7	10	10	8	10	12	11	11

=== NIT results ===
The Rams have appeared in the National Invitation Tournament (NIT) six times. Their combined record is 5–7.

Year	Round	Opponent	Result
1978	First Round	Detroit	L 86–94
1988	First Round; Second Round; Quarterfinals	Marshall; Southern Miss; Connecticut	W 81–80; W 93–89; L 60–69
1993	First Round	Old Dominion	L 68–74
2005	Opening Round	Davidson	L 62–77
2008	First Round	UAB	L 77–80
2022	First Round; Second Round	Princeton; Wake Forest	W 90–79; L 74–80
2024	First Round; Second Round; Quarterfinals	Villanova; South Florida; Utah	W 70–61; W 70–65; L 54–74

=== CBI results ===
The Rams have appeared in the College Basketball Invitational (CBI) one time. Their record is 5–0 and they were CBI champions in 2010.

Year	Round	Opponent	Result
2010	First Round; Quarterfinals; Semifinals; Finals Game 1 Finals Game 2	George Washington; College of Charleston; Boston University; Saint Louis; Saint Louis	W 79–73; W 93–86; W 88–75; W 68–56; W 71–65

== VCU vs. the AP Top 25 (since 2009–10) ==
Since the 2009–10 season, VCU has played a total of 46 games against teams ranked in the AP Top 25 Poll. VCU has a record of 14–32 against such teams. They have a record of 1–5 against teams in the Top 5 during this span, the lone win coming against #2 Kansas during the 2011 NCAA tournament in which Kansas was a #1 seed. The Rams also hold a record of 6–4 against ranked teams at the Siegel Center since the arena first opened in 1999.

Year	Opponent	Result	Location
2009–10	#17 Oklahoma	W 82–69	Home
2010–11	#24 Tennessee #13 Purdue #2 Kansas	L 72–77; W 94–76; W 71–61	Neutral; NCAA; NCAA
2011–12	#13 Alabama #18 Wichita State #16 Indiana	L 64–72; W 62–59; L 61–63	Away; NCAA; NCAA
2012–13	#19 Memphis #5 Duke #13 Missouri #20 Butler #16 St. Louis #10 Michigan	W 78–65; L 58–67; L 65–68; W 84–52; L 56–62; L 53–78	Neutral; Neutral; Neutral; Home; A-10; NCAA
2013–14	#25 Virginia #12 St. Louis #10 St. Louis	W 59–56; L 62–64; W 67–56	Away; Away; Home
2014–15	#12 Villanova #7 Virginia #23 Northern Iowa #24 Davidson	L 77–53; L 74–57; W 93–82; W 93–73	Neutral; Home; Home; A-10
2015–16	#5 Duke #23 Cincinnati #7 Oklahoma	L 79–71; L 69–63; L 85–81	Neutral; Home; NCAA
2016–17	#20 Baylor #22 Saint Mary's	L 71–63; L 77–85	Neutral; NCAA
2017–18	#19 Seton Hall #22 Rhode Island #25 Rhode Island	L 67–90; L 68–81; L 67–76	Away; Home; A-10
2018–19	#4 Virginia	L 49–57	Away
2019–20	#23 LSU #17 Tennessee #13 Dayton #5 Dayton	W 84–82; L 69–72; L 65–79; L 61–66	Home; Neutral; Away; Home
2020–21	#15 West Virginia	L 66–78	Neutral
2021–22	#6 Baylor #22 Connecticut #25 Davidson	L 61–69; L 63–70; W 70–68	Neutral; Neutral; Away
2022–23	#19 Saint Mary's	L 51-63	NCAA
2023–24	#18 Dayton #25 Dayton	W 49-47; L 86-91	Home; Away
2024-25	#17 BYU	L 71-80	NCAA
2025–26	#25 NC State #24 Vanderbilt #18 Saint Louis #21 North Carolina #13 Illinois	L 79–85; L 74–89; L 75–88; W 82-78; L 55–76	Away; Neutral; Away; NCAA; NCAA

== BracketBuster games ==
From 2005 to 2012, VCU had participated in ESPN's BracketBusters series, in which the Rams would play against another team from a mid-major conference. VCU's record during this series was 5–3, going 3–1 at home. Scores in bold represent games in which VCU was the home team.

Date	Opponent	Result
February 19, 2005	Charleston	L, 75–86
February 17, 2006	Albany	**W, 70–67**
February 17, 2007	Bradley	**L, 64–73**
February 23, 2008	Akron	W, 57–52
February 20, 2009	Nevada	L, 70–71
February 20, 2010	Akron	**W, 70–53**
February 18, 2011	Wichita State	W, 68–67
February 17, 2012	Northern Iowa	**W, 77–68**

== See also ==
- Mike Rhoades
- Siegel Center
- VCU Rams
- Atlantic 10 Conference
- Capital City Classic
- Old Dominion–VCU men's basketball rivalry
- George Mason–VCU rivalry
- VCU Rams women's basketball
