= Norbert Tóth (basketball) =

Hungarian basketball player

Personal information
- Born: September 4, 1986 (age 40) Budapest, Hungary
- Listed height: 6 ft 8 in (2.03 m)
- Listed weight: 226 lb (103 kg)

Career information
- NBA draft: 2008: undrafted
- Position: Forward

Career history
- 2005–2013: PVSK Panthers
- 2013–2014: Alba Fehérvár
- 2014–2016: Körmend
- 2016–2020: Falco Szombathely
- 2020–2021: Körmend
- 2021–2022: Hoya Veszprém
- 2022–2023: PVSK

Career highlights
- Hungarian League champion (2019)

Norbert Tóth (born September 4, 1986) is a Hungarian basketball player for Falco KC Szombathely and the Hungarian national team.

He participated at the EuroBasket 2017.
