= Juvonte Reddic =

American basketball player

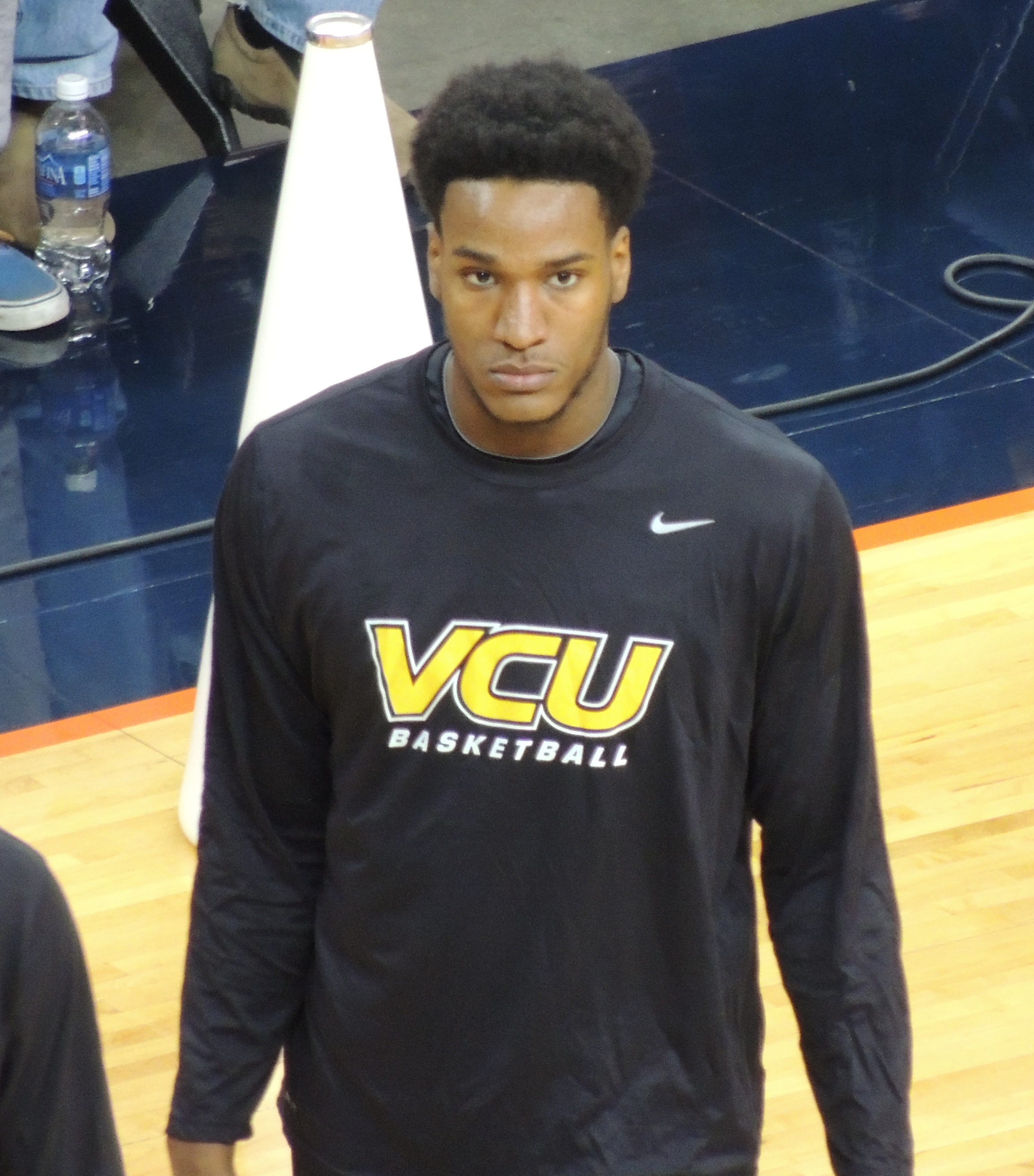
- Reddic warms up before a game in November, 2013.

No. 51 – Hapoel Haifa
- Position: Power forward
- League: Israeli Basketball Premier League

Personal information
- Born: May 23, 1992 (age 34) Winston-Salem, North Carolina, U.S.
- Listed height: 6 ft 9 in (2.06 m)
- Listed weight: 247 lb (112 kg)

Career information
- High school: Quality Education Academy (Winston-Salem, North Carolina)
- College: VCU (2010–2014)
- NBA draft: 2014: undrafted
- Playing career: 2014–present

Career history
- 2014–2015: Victoria Libertas Pesaro
- 2015: Virtus Bologna
- 2015–2016: Canton Charge
- 2016–2017: Kolossos Rodou
- 2017–2018: Belfius Mons-Hainaut
- 2018–2020: Falco Szombathely
- 2020–2022: Chorale Roanne Basket
- 2022–2023: Ironi Kiryat Ata
- 2023-2024: Astros de Jalisco
- 2024-present: Hapoel Haifa

Career highlights
- Hungarian League champion (2019); 2× Second-team All-Atlantic 10 (2013, 2014)

Juvonte Reddic (born May 23, 1992) is an American professional basketball player for Ironi Kiryat Ata of the Israeli Basketball Premier League. A 6' 9" power forward, Reddic played college basketball for Virginia Commonwealth University (VCU).

== College career ==
Reddic chose VCU over Maryland, Ole Miss and Oklahoma out of Quality Education Academy in Winston-Salem, North Carolina. As a freshman, Reddic was a role player, but did contribute to the Rams' run to the 2011 NCAA Final Four. He moved into the starting lineup as a sophomore, averaging 10.3 points and 6.7 rebounds per game and earning third-team All-Colonial Athletic Association honors.

As a junior and senior, Reddic became one of the top big men in the Atlantic 10 Conference, earning second-team all-conference honors both seasons and earned national recognition in his senior season as he was one of 50 players nationally added to the John R. Wooden Award watch list for national player of the year. Reddic finished with 1,438 points and 895 rebounds for his career.

== Professional career ==
=== 2014–15 season ===
Following the close of his college career, Reddic was not drafted in the 2014 NBA draft. On August 6, 2014, he signed with Victoria Libertas Pesaro of Italy for the 2014–15 season. In January 2015, he left Pesaro and signed with Virtus Pallacanestro Bologna for the rest of the season.

=== 2015–16 season ===
In July 2015, Reddic joined the Brooklyn Nets for the 2015 NBA Summer League. On October 31, Reddic was selected by the Canton Charge in the third round of the 2015 NBA Development League draft.

=== 2016–17 season ===
On August 22, 2016, Reddic signed with the Greek team Kolossos Rodou. He was voted as the Greek Basket League MVP of the 1st round.

=== 2017–present ===
Reddic played for Falco KC Szombathely of the Hungarian League. In the 2019–20 season he averaged 15.4 points and 5.4 rebounds per game. On May 29, 2020, he signed with Chorale Roanne Basket of the LNB Pro A. Reddic averaged 12.3 points, 5.1 rebounds and 1.4 steals per game. He re-signed with the team on June 19, 2021.

In the summer of 2022, he signed with Ironi Kiryat Ata of the Israeli Basketball Premier League.
