= Gašper Okorn =

Slovenian basketball coach

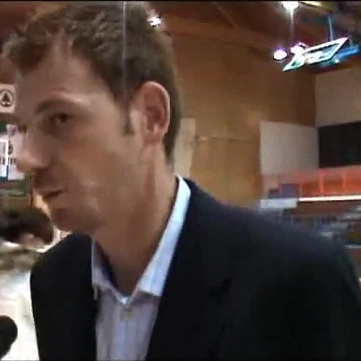
- Okorn coaching Slovan in 2011

Pistoia Basket 2000
- Position: Head coach
- League: LBA

Personal information
- Born: 9 April 1973 (age 53) Ljubljana, SR Slovenia, SFR Yugoslavia
- Coaching career: 1996–present

Career history

Coaching
- 1996–1998: ŽKK Škofja Loka (youth)
- 1998–2000: ŽKK Škofja Loka
- 2000–2001: Škofja Loka (assistant)
- 2001–2003: Škofja Loka
- 2003–2005: Union Olimpija (assistant)
- 2005–2006: Lietuvos rytas (assistant)
- 2006: Union Olimpija (assistant)
- 2006–2007: Union Olimpija
- 2007–2008: Ventspils
- 2008–2009: Energa Czarni Slupsk
- 2010–2013: Slovan
- 2013: Al Kuwait
- 2013–2014: AZS Koszalin
- 2014–2015: Helios Suns
- 2016–2018: Union / Petrol Olimpija
- 2018–2021: Falco KC Szombathely
- 2022: Cibona
- 2022–2024: Krka
- 2024–2025: Pistoia Basket 2000
- 2024–: Hungary

Career highlights
- Slovenian League champion (2017); 2× Hungarian League champion (2019, 2021); Croatian League champion (2022); Slovenian Cup winner (2017); Hungarian Cup winner (2021); Croatian Cup winner (2022)

Gašper Okorn (born 9 April 1973) is a Slovenian professional basketball coach for the Hungary men's national basketball team.
