= Evan Bruinsma =

American basketball player (born 1992)

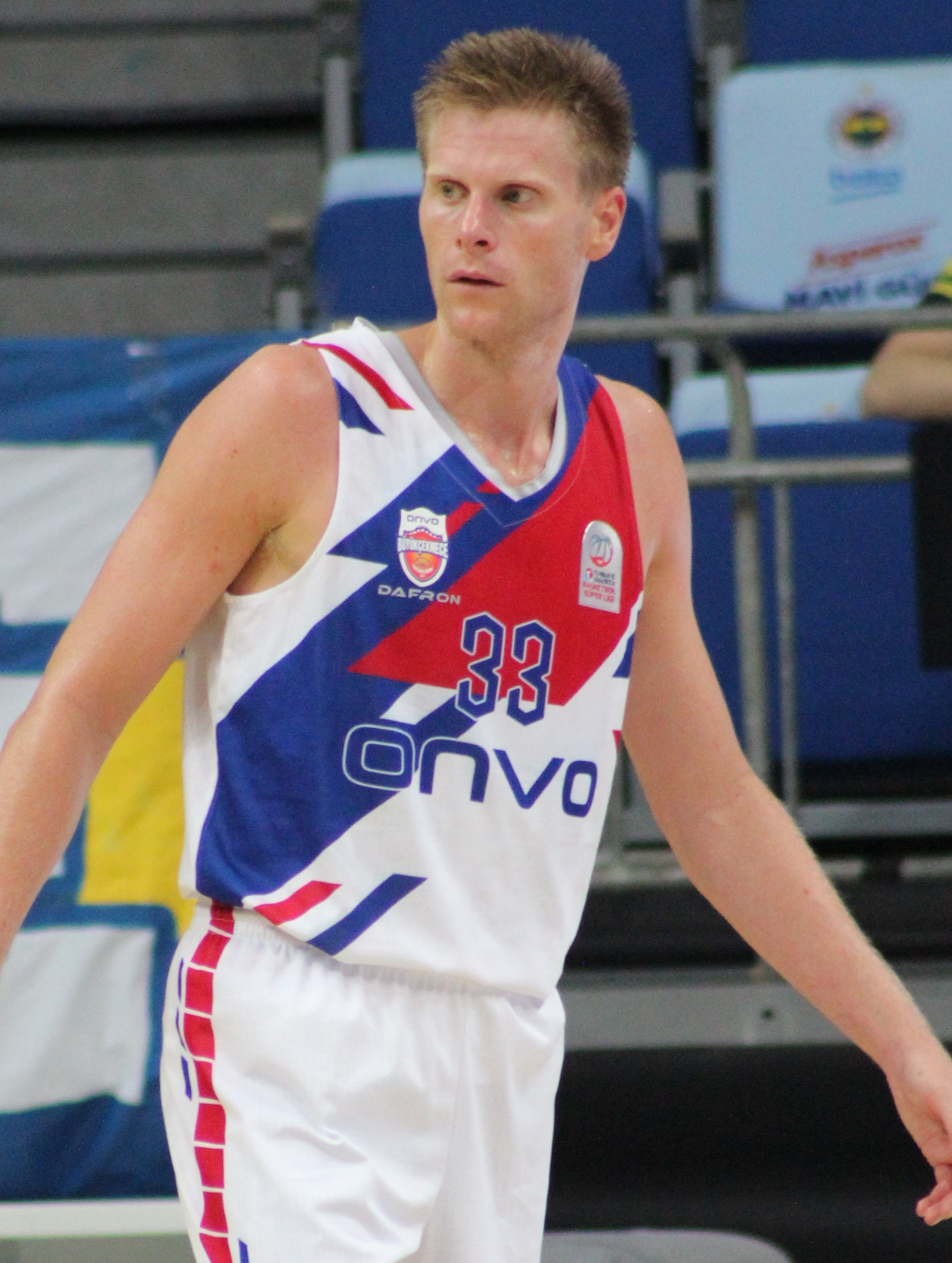
- Bruinsma with Büyükçekmece in 2024

No. 24 – Sabah BC
- Position: Power forward
- League: Azerbaijan Basketball League; Champions League

Personal information
- Born: September 9, 1992 (age 34) New Era, Michigan, U.S.
- Listed height: 6 ft 8 in (2.03 m)
- Listed weight: 215 lb (98 kg)

Career information
- High school: Western Michigan Christian (Muskegon, Michigan)
- College: Detroit Mercy (2010–2014)
- NBA draft: 2014: undrafted
- Playing career: 2014–present

Career history
- 2015: Amicale Steinsel
- 2015–2016: Tuři Svitavy
- 2016–2017: Rilski Sportist
- 2017–2018: Donar
- 2018–2019: Falco Szombathely
- 2019–2020: Bayreuth
- 2020: Hapoel Be'er Sheva
- 2020–2021: Falco Szombathely
- 2021–2022: Büyükçekmece
- 2022–2023: Manisa
- 2023–2026: Büyükçekmece
- 2026: Bnei Herzliya
- 2026–present: Sabah BC

Career highlights
- All-DBL Team (2018); DBL champion (2018); Dutch Cup champion (2018); FIBA Europe Cup Fan Vote Forward of the Year (2018); Hungarian League champion (2019, 2021); Hungarian Cup winner (2021)

Evan John Bruinsma (born September 9, 1992) is an American professional basketball player for Sabah BC of the Azerbaijan Basketball League (ABL). He played college basketball for the Detroit Mercy Titans. Bruinsma usually plays as a power forward.

== Professional career ==
=== Donar (2017–2018) ===
On July 20, 2017, Donar of the Dutch Basketball League (DBL) signed Bruinsma to a 1-year contract. On November 16, 2017, Bruinsma was named the FIBA Europe Cup Top Performer of Round 4 after scoring 34 points and grabbing 10 rebounds to go for an index rating of 40, in a 94–56 win against Bosnian side Bosna. On November 16, Bruinsma was named Top Performer of the FIBA Europe Cup for the second time in the 2017–18 season. This time, he recorded 23 points and 9 rebounds in a 95–72 win over U-BT Cluj-Napoca. On April 23, 2018, Bruinsma's season was honored with a place in the All-DBL Team. With the club, he won the DBL championship and the NBB Cup.

=== Falco (2018–2019) ===
In July 2018, Bruinsma signed with Falco Vulcano of the Hungarian NB I/A. With Falco, Bruinsma won the Hungarian national championship after sweeping Egis Körmend in the finals.

=== Medi Bayreuth (2019–2020) ===
On July 18, 2019, he has signed with Medi Bayreuth of the Basketball Bundesliga. In March, the season was suspended due to the COVID-19 pandemic. In May 2020, the club announced Bruinsma had left the team.

=== Hapoel Be'er Sheva (2020) ===
On May 14, 2020, Bruinsma signed a contract with Hapoel Be'er Sheva B.C. He averaged 18.0 points and 8.3 rebounds per game in 8 Winner League games.

=== Return to Falco (2020–2021) ===
On August 5, 2020, Bruinsma returned to his former team, Falco Szombathely.

=== Büyükçekmece Basketbol (2021–2022) ===
On August 7, 2021, Bruinsma signed with Büyükçekmece Basketbol of the Turkish Basketbol Süper Ligi.

=== Manisa BB (2022–2023) ===
On June 2, 2022, he has signed with Manisa BB of the Turkish Basketbol Süper Ligi.

=== Return to Büyükçekmece Basketbol (2023–2026) ===
On June 20, 2023, he signed with ONVO Büyükçekmece of the Basketbol Süper Ligi (BSL).

=== Sabah BC (2026–present) ===
On August 18, 2026, he signed with Sabah BC of the Azerbaijan Basketball League.

== Career statistics ==
=== FIBA Europe Cup ===
Year	Team	GP	GS	MPG	FG%	3P%	FT%	RPG	APG	SPG	BPG	PPG
2017–18	Donar	17	17	28.2	.471	.373	.784	7.1	1.1	.5	.9	12.1
