= Toti Sport =

Hungarian sportswear brand

- Industry: Textile
- Founded: 1989; 37 years ago
- Headquarters: Budapest, Hungary
- Key people: László Tóth, Lászlóné Tóth
- Products: sportswear, sports Goods
- Website: www.totisport.hu

Toti Sport is a Hungarian sports clothing brand.

== Sponsorships ==
The following teams wear uniforms and apparel manufactured by TOTI:

=== Football ===
- (Hungary) Szentlőrinci AC

=== Basketball ===
National teams

- Hungary

Associations

- (Hungary) Hungarian Basketball Federation (Official Referee Kits)

Club teams

- (Hungary) ELTE BEAC
- (Hungary) Ceglédi EKK
- (Hungary) Sopron Basket
- (Hungary) PINKK-Pécsi 424
- (Hungary) Szedeák
- (Hungary) KSC Szekszárd
- (Hungary) Vasas Akadémia

=== Handball ===
- (Hungary) Csepel DSE
- (Hungary) Euronovex USE

=== Boxing ===
- (Hungary) Hungarian Boxing Association
- (Hungary) MTK Budapest
- (Hungary) Vecsés
