= Damier Pitts =

American basketball player

Personal information
- Born: December 3, 1989 (age 36) Charlotte, North Carolina
- Listed height: 5 ft 10 in (1.78 m)
- Listed weight: 176 lb (80 kg)

Career information
- High school: Hargrave Military Academy (Chatham, Virginia)
- College: Marshall (2008–2012)
- Playing career: 2012–present
- Position: Point guard

Career history
- 2012–2013: KFÍ
- 2013–2014: Istanbul DSI
- 2014–2015: Roseto Sharks
- 2015–2016: BK Ventspils
- 2016–2017: Valmiera Ordo
- 2017–2018: Kataja BC
- 2018: S.L. Benfica
- 2018–2019: Jászberényi KSE
- 2019: Soproni KC
- 2020–2021: Rabotnički
- 2022–2023: Grindavík
- 2023: Gastonia Snipers
- 2023: Haukar
- 2024: KK Zagreb

Career highlights
- Portuguese League Cup champion (2018); Icelandic League All-Star (2013); Latvian League All-Star (2017); Úrvalsdeild scoring champion (2013); Third-team All-Conference USA (2012)

Damier Erik Pitts (born December 3, 1989) is an American professional basketball player. He played college basketball for Marshall before starting his professional career in 2012. During his first professional season, he led the Icelandic top-tier Úrvalsdeild karla in scoring. In 2018, he won the Portuguese League Cup with S.L. Benfica.

== College career ==
Pitts played for Marshall University from 2008 to 2012 and was named to the All-Conference USA Third-Team after his senior year.

== Professional career ==
Pitts started his professional career in the Icelandic Úrvalsdeild karla with KFÍ in 2012. He led the league in scoring with 33.5 points per game and was selected for the 2013 Icelandic All-Star game.

In October 2018, Pitts signed with Jászberényi KSE of the Nemzeti Bajnokság I/A, replacing Remon Nelson.

In January 2020, Pitts signed with KK Rabotnički of the Macedonian Basketball League.

In November 2022, Pitts returned to Iceland and signed with Grindavík. In 2023, he joined Gastonia Snipers of the East Coast Basketball League.

In November 2023, Pitts returned to Iceland once again and signed with Haukar. He left the team when it entered the leagues christmas break after appearing in four league games where he averaged 14.8 points.

In 2024, Pitts signed with KK Zagreb.

== The Basketball Tournament ==
In 2017, Pitts participated in The Basketball Tournament with team NC Prodigal Sons. Pitts led the team to a first round upset of Ole Hotty Toddy, a team of Ole Miss alumni. The team made it to the Sweet 16 before being beaten by Ram Nation, a team of VCU alumni. The Basketball Tournament is a $2 million winner-take-all tournament broadcast annually on ESPN.
