= Đorđe Pantelić =

Bosnian footballer (born 1999)

Personal information
- Date of birth: 29 November 1999 (age 26)
- Place of birth: Brčko, Bosnia and Herzegovina
- Height: 1.80 m (5 ft 11 in)
- Position: Winger

Team information
- Current team: Atyrau
- Number: 90

Youth career
- 2005–2014: Jedinstvo Brčko
- 2014–2017: Zvijezda 09
- 2017–2018: Vojvodina

Senior career*
Years	Team	Apps	(Gls)
2018–2021	Vojvodina	1	(0)
2018–2020	→ Kabel (loan)	56	(10)
2021	→ Inđija (loan)	18	(0)
2021–2022	Radnik Bijeljina	31	(4)
2022	Velež Mostar	18	(2)
2023–2024	Tuzla City	43	(13)
2024–2026	Radnik Bijeljina	48	(10)
2026	Spartak Kostroma	12	(2)
2026–	Atyrau	14	(3)
- * Club domestic league appearances and goals as of 1 November 2026

Đorđe Pantelić (Serbian Cyrillic: Ђорђе Пантелић; born 29 November 1999) is a Bosnian professional footballer who plays as a winger for Kazakhstani club Atyrau.

== Club career ==
On 8 July 2021, Pantelić signed with Radnik Bijeljina in Bosnia and Herzegovina.

== Career statistics ==
=== Club ===
As of 20 May 2021

Club	Season	League			Cup		Continental		Other		Total	
Club	Season	Division	Apps	Goals	Apps	Goals	Apps	Goals	Apps	Goals	Apps	Goals
Vojvodina	2020–21	Serbian SuperLiga	1	0	1	0	—	—	—		2	0
Vojvodina	Total		1	0	1	0	—		—		2	0
Kabel (loan)	2018–19	Serbian League Vojvodina	29	8	0	0	—		—		29	8
Kabel (loan)	2019–20	Serbian First League	27	2	0	0	—		—		27	2
Kabel (loan)	Total		56	10	0	0	—		—		56	10
Inđija (loan)	2020–21	Serbian SuperLiga	18	0	0	0	—		—		18	0
Career total			75	10	1	0	—		—		76	10
