= Miloš Borisov =

Montenegrin coach and former basketball player (born 1985)

Personal information
- Born: 3 September 1985 (age 41) Bijelo Polje, SR Montenegro, SFR Yugoslavia
- Listed height: 2.01 m (6 ft 7 in)
- Listed weight: 93 kg (205 lb)

Career information
- NBA draft: 2007: undrafted
- Playing career: 2003–present
- Position: Small forward

Career history
- 2003–2011: Hemofarm
- 2005–2006: → OKK Beograd
- 2011–2012: Teramo
- 2012–2013: Radnički Kragujevac
- 2013: Vojvodina SG
- 2014–2015: Soproni KC
- 2015–2017: Szolnoki Olaj
- 2017–2018: Falco KC Szombathely
- 2018–2020: DEAC
- 2020–2022: Soproni KC
- 2022–2023: Kecskeméti TE

Career highlights
- Adriatic League champion (2005); Hungarian League champion (2016)

Miloš Borisov (Serbian Cyrillic: Милош Борисов; born 3 September 1985) is a former Montenegrin professional basketball player
