= Darrin Govens =

American-Hungarian basketball player

No. 40 – Rabotnički
- Position: Point guard
- League: Macedonian League

Personal information
- Born: January 5, 1988 (age 38) Chester, Pennsylvania
- Listed height: 6 ft 1 in (1.85 m)
- Listed weight: 187 lb (85 kg)

Career information
- High school: Chester (Chester, Pennsylvania)
- College: Saint Joseph's (2006–2010)
- NBA draft: 2010: undrafted
- Playing career: 2010–present

Career history
- 2010: Reno Bighorns
- 2011–2012: Þór Þorlákshöfn
- 2012–2013: Ironi Kiryat Ata
- 2013–2014: Ikaros
- 2014: Körmend
- 2015: Þór Þorlákshöfn
- 2015–2016: ZTE
- 2016–2018: Falco Szombathely
- 2018: Tsmoki-Minsk
- 2018: Nizhny Novgorod
- 2019: Falco Szombathely
- 2019–2020: Alba Fehérvár
- 2020–2021: Szedeák
- 2021–2022: Cholet Basket
- 2022: Limoges CSP
- 2022–2023: SLUC Nancy Basket
- 2023–2024: DEAC
- 2024–2026: TFT
- 2026–present: Rabotnički

Career highlights
- Icelandic League All-Star (2012); NB I/A MVP (2017); Hungarian League champion (2019)

Anthony Darrin Govens (born January 5, 1988) is an American-Hungarian professional basketball player for Rabotnički of the Macedonian League

== Early career ==
Govens was named the Class 4A Pennsylvania Player of the Year in both 2005 and 2006 was a 2006 All-State 1st Team selection by Associated Press, along with teammate Garrett Williamson in high school.

== College career ==
During his sophomore year in college, he averaged 9.8 points per game. He scored 1,360 points over his four-year career. His career high came against La Salle University when he scored 26 points. He was not drafted in the 2010 NBA D-League Draft, but made the Reno Bighorns roster.

== Professional career ==
Govens played for Þór Þorlákshöfn in the Úrvalsdeild karla during the 2011–2012 season. He was named the best player of the first half of the season after averaging 25.0 points and 4.3 assists in the first 11 games and leading Þór to a 7–4 record. He was named to the Icelandic All-Star game in January 2012 where he scored 12 points.

He returned to Þór in January 2015, replacing Vee Sanford.

On September 3, 2019, he has signed with Alba Fehérvár of the Hungarian League. Govens averaged 12.4 points, 2.4 rebounds and 3.3 assists per game. On August 17, 2020, he signed with Szedeák.

On July 26, 2021, he has signed with Cholet Basket of the LNB Pro A.

On July 27, 2022, he has signed with Limoges CSP of the LNB Pro A.

On November 10, 2022, he signed with SLUC Nancy Basket of the French Pro A.

== National team career ==
In 2017, Govens played with the Hungarian national basketball team.
