= U-BT Cluj-Napoca =

- 2026–27 U-BT Cluj-Napoca season
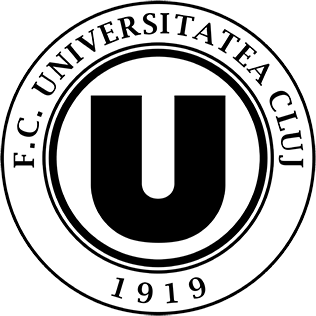
- Nickname: Șepcile roșii (The Red Caps); Studenții (The Students); Alb-Negrii (The White and Blacks)
- Leagues: Liga Națională; ABA League; EuroCup
- Founded: 1947; 79 years ago
- History: List: Clubul Sportiv Universitar Cluj (1948–1950) Știința Cluj (1950–1955) IMF-Progresul Cluj (1955–1957) Știința-IMF Cluj (1957–1966) CS Universitatea Cluj (1966–1974) CS Universitatea Cluj-Napoca (1974–1990) Universitatea Metalul Roșu Cluj-Napoca (1990–1991) "U" Fimaro Cluj-Napoca (1991–1995) "U" SM Invest Cluj-Napoca (1995–1997) "U" Sanex Cluj-Napoca (1997–1998) "U" Carbochim Cluj-Napoca (1998–2001) BU Poli-Carbochim Cluj-Napoca (2001–2005) BU Poli-Mobitelco Cluj-Napoca (2005–2006) U-Mobitelco Cluj-Napoca (2006–2009) "U" Mobitelco Cluj-Napoca (2009–2010) "U" Mobitelco BT Cluj-Napoca (2010–2014) U-BT Cluj-Napoca (2014–present)
- Arena: BTarena; Horia Demian
- Capacity: 10,000; 2,525
- Location: Cluj-Napoca, Romania
- Team colors: White, Black
- Main sponsor: Banca Transilvania
- President: Marius Bojiță
- Vice-presidents: Sergiu Mircea; Patrick Ciorcilă; Cosmin Vladimirescu
- Head coach: Mihai Silvășan
- Team captain: Patrick Richard
- Championships: 11 Romanian Leagues (Note: Only eight Romanian Leagues according to the club's website and social media accounts, the other three league titles; won during the 1990s, are claimed by the Universitatea Cluj multi sports club, and are not officially part of the current club's records.); 8 Romanian Cups (Note: Only seven Romanian Cups according to the club's website and social media accounts, the eighth Romanian Cup; won in 1995, is claimed by the Universitatea Cluj multi sports club, officially not being part of the current club's records.); 5 Romanian Supercups
- Website: u-bt.ro
Home	Away

U-Banca Transilvania Cluj-Napoca, commonly known as U-BT Cluj-Napoca, is a professional basketball club based in Cluj-Napoca, Romania that competes domestically in the Liga Națională, internationally in the EuroCup and the regional ABA League. Like other teams that were initially part of the Universitatea Cluj multi sports club, the basketball team keeps the letter U (short form of Universitatea) in its name. The main sponsor of the team is the locally based banking institution Banca Transilvania. The team colors are black and white. U-BT Cluj-Napoca plays its home games at the BTarena, which accommodates 10,000 spectators, or in Horia Demian Sports Hall with a capacity of 2,525 spectators.

Initially being founded in 1947, the basketball team split from the parent sports club at the beginning of the 2000s, retaining its place in the top tier of Romanian basketball. While the current club is widely considered as the successor of the team that won three league titles before the turn of the century, the parent club claims all the trophies won before 2002 as part of its own records. In 2017, an image partnership was agreed between U-BT Cluj-Napoca and FC Universitatea Cluj (the local football club which itself was functioning as a private entity following its split from the parent sports club), uniting them under the same brand. Therefore, beginning with the 2017-18 season, U-BT Cluj-Napoca uses the same logo as the football club.

In all its forms since the 1940s, the club has won eleven Romanian League Championships, eight Romanian Cups, and five Romanian Supercups, while also performing very good in European competitions, reaching the quarterfinals of both the Basketball Champions League and the EuroCup in recent seasons. The most famous name who played for the club is undoubtedly Gheorghe Mureșan, who remains to this day the only Romanian ever to play in the NBA. Another mention should go to Mihai Silvășan, who played for the Cluj team between 2002 and 2015, and then became the club's head coach in 2016. Since the 2025–26 season, the team competes the regional ABA League, which mostly features clubs from the former Yugoslavia.

== History ==
=== Early history (1947-1990) ===
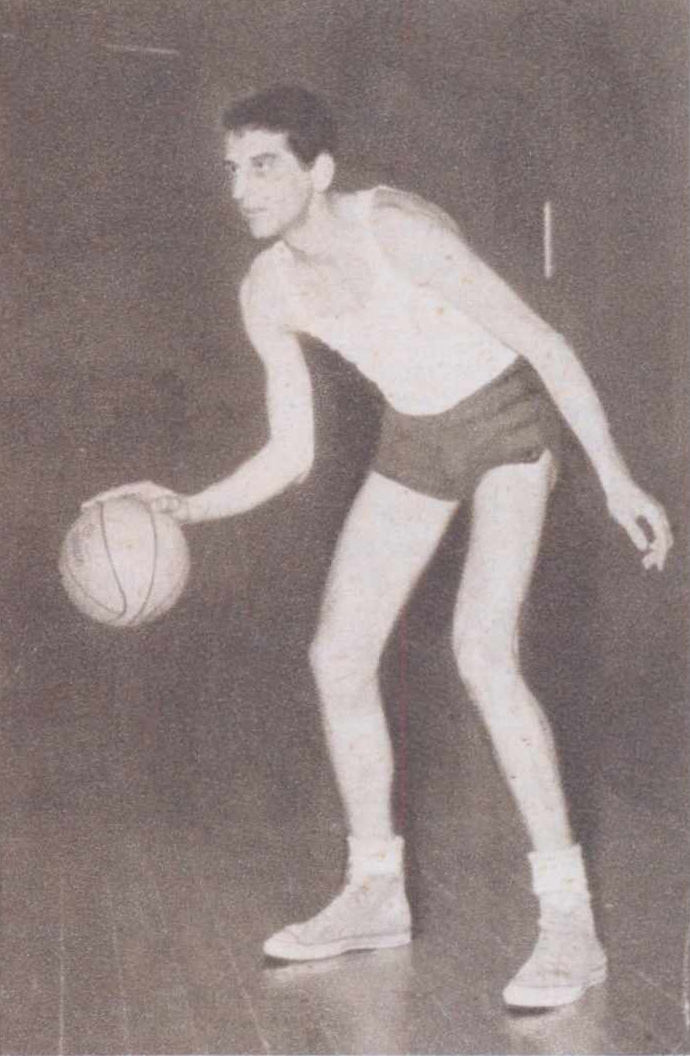
Horia Demian played for the Cluj team for nearly twenty years, until his retirement as a player in 1974.

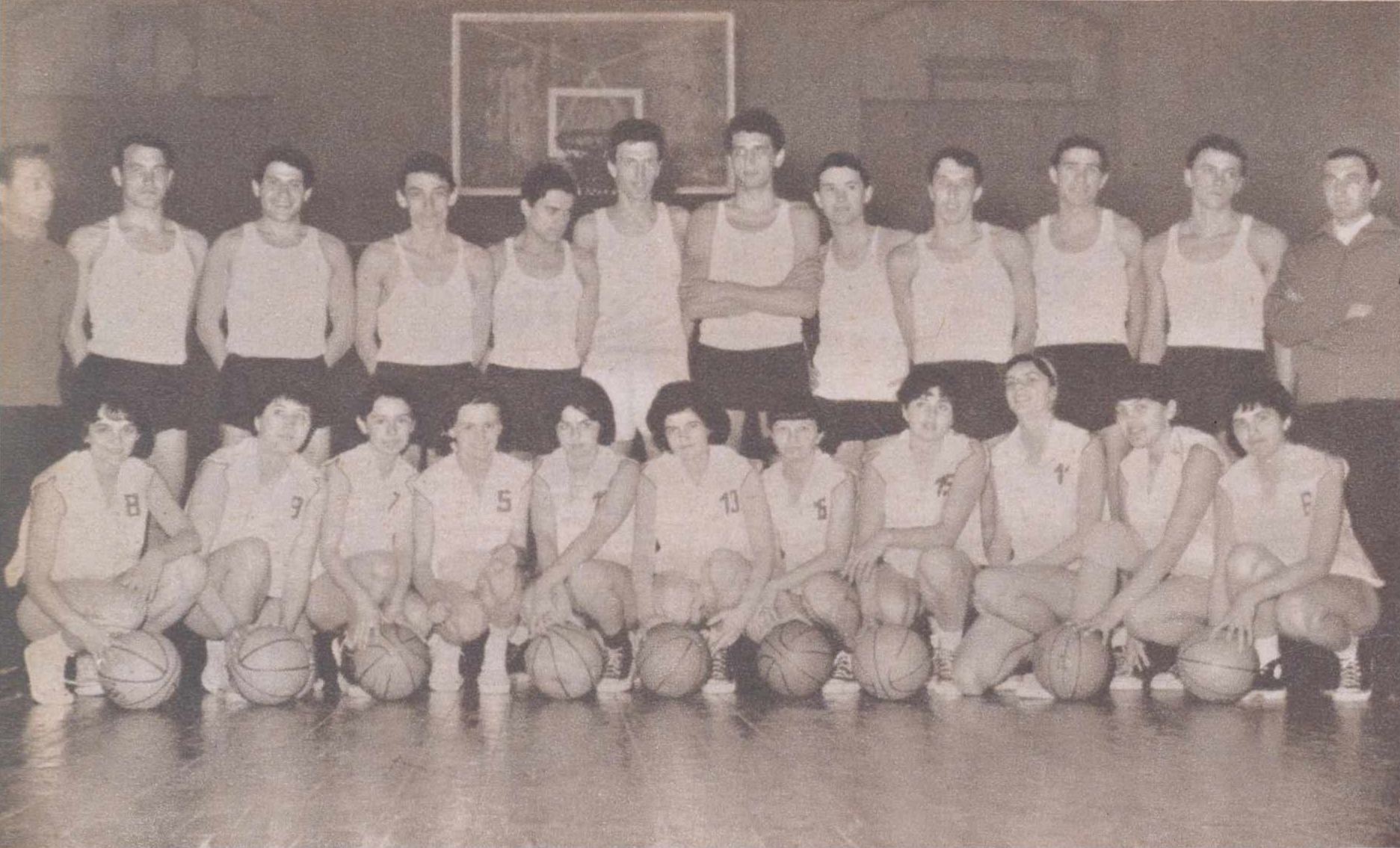
Universitatea Cluj men's basketball team (top row) and women's basketball team (bottom row) in April 1966.

Whilst the Universitatea Cluj multi sports club was founded in 1919, the basketball team was only established in 1947, coexisting for about a year with its equivalent at the Bolyai University, before their merger in December 1948. The club later changed its name to Știința Cluj in 1950, before switching it back to Universitatea in 1966. In its early stages during the late 1940s and early 1950s, the Romanian championship was played in a qualification format, teams having to play in local and regional championships in order to qualify for the final tournament. Therefore, this period was marked by a battle for local supremacy between Știința and teams like Dermata (later renamed Flamura Roșie), ASA Cluj and Metalul, The Red Caps often falling short against their more established rivals. In fact, many of the better players in the team were loaned to Divizia A side Flamura Roșie, once the new divisional championship format was established. However, the 1955 season saw the students (now playing under the name IMF-Progresul Cluj) being promoted to the first tier for the first time in their history, under the leadership of coach Gheorghe Rusu. Many of the players that were loaned a couple of years earlier, now armed with experience playing at the higher level, were part of that year's roster.

Following promotion, the results would continue to improve, culminating in a second-place finish during the 1958–59 season. This result kickstarted two decades of strong performances in the top flight, spearheaded by talented players like Horia Demian, Imre Vizi, Mihai Albu, Gheorghe Roman and Matei Rührig. During the Socialist Republic of Romania, the Romanian basketball landscape was dominated by Steaua and Dinamo Bucharest, teams which were closely tied with the army and the Ministry of Internal Affairs respectively. This led to support from the communist regime in terms of training facilities and recruitment of the best players in the league. However, Studenții were often the main challengers of their rivals from the capital, finishing once in second and nine times in third during the 1960s and 1970s.

The 1980s however saw a decline in results, with lower finishes in the championship eventually culminating in relegation to Divizia B following the 1986–87 season. The turn of the decade found Universitatea back in the top flight, with a young Gheorghe Mureșan starring alongside other players that were going to play an important role for the club in the years to come.

=== Three Romanian championship titles (1990-2000) ===
The new decade saw a turn in fortunes for the Cluj team. This was made possible by some marquee signings: Mihai Sinevici, Bruno Roschnafski and Mircea Cristescu; all national team players, cumulated with a progress in training and preparations under the coaching duo of Gheorghe Roman and Liviu Morariu. It did not take long for the results to show on the court, the students establishing themselves as title contenders during the 1990–91 season, while also managing to defeat Panionios Athens (a strong representative of Greek basketball at that time) in the first round of the FIBA Korać Cup. Unfortunately for them, the season would end in disappointment, following a best-of-three play-off final defeat against Steaua Bucharest.

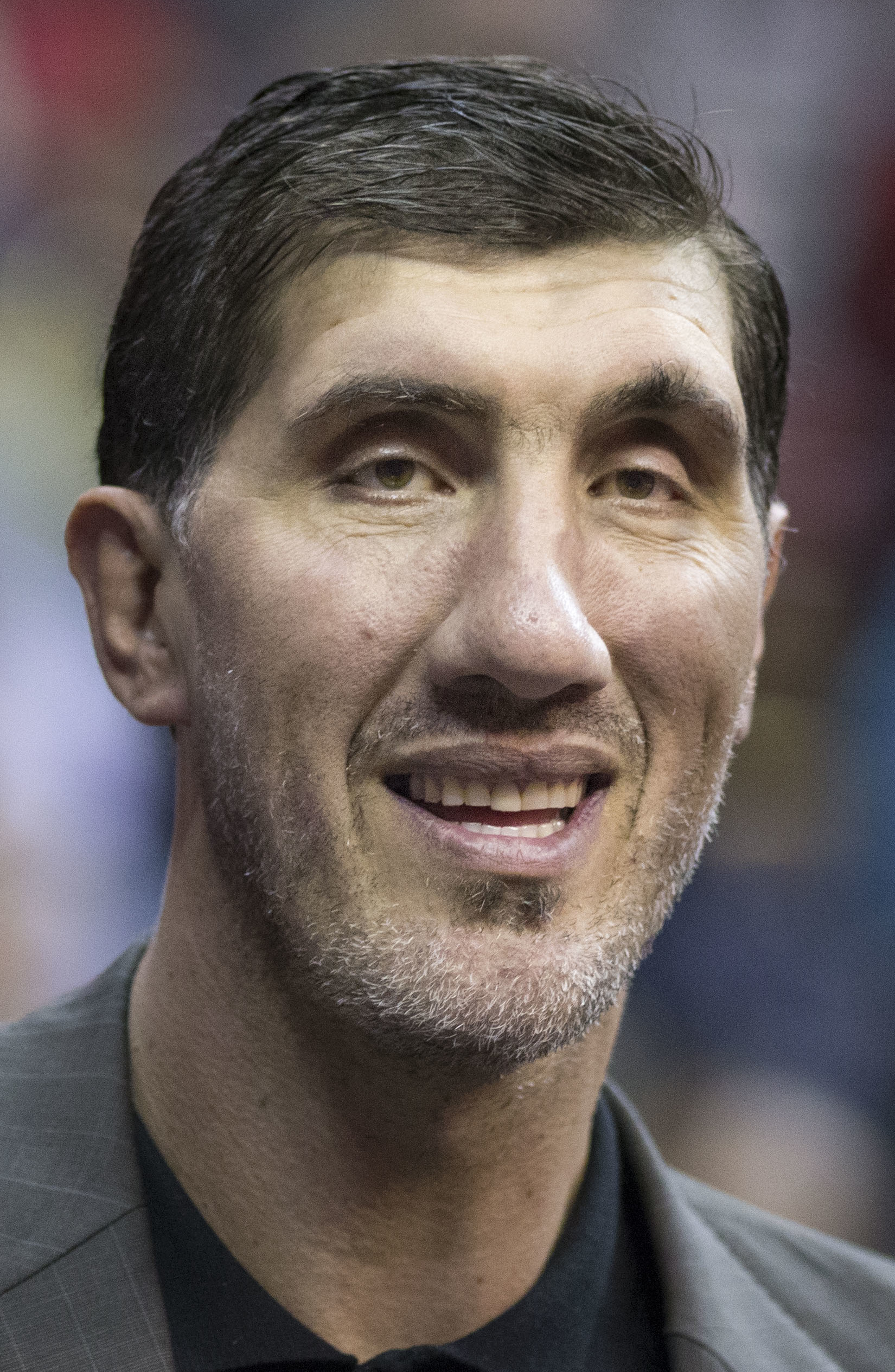
Gheorghe Mureșan played for the Cluj team until the summer of 1992. He spent one season with the French team Pau-Orthez, and later, he entered the 1993 NBA draft, where he was selected by the Washington Bullets with the 30th pick.

Their performances during the previous campaign would bring a new premiere for The White and Blacks: their first ever participation in the FIBA European Cup, entering to compete in the second round of the 1991-92 season against Pau-Orthez. In the first leg, Universitatea managed a famous home win against the French team, 107–101. However, it wasn't enough to advance for the next round, Pau-Orthez winning the reverse leg by eleven. On the domestic front there would be no mistakes this time. With the presence of the best two centers in the league in their roster (Ghiță Mureșan and Bruno Roschnafski), and the addition of Marcel Țenter at point guard, Universitatea won the first title in their history after a play-off final against Dinamo Bucharest, becoming the first team from outside the capital to be crowned as Romanian Champions.

The following season would see the departures of Mureșan and Roschnafski from the team, to France and Germany respectively, and the addition of Cornel Geomolean. Mureșan would become the first Romanian to play in the NBA, by signing with the Washington Bullets in 1993. He played six successful seasons with the Bullets and the New Jersey Nets; with career averages of 9.8 points, 6.4 rebounds and 0.5 assists, and he won the NBA Most Improved Player Award following the 1995–96 NBA season. For The Red Caps, their first domestic championship title would translate into their first participation into the FIBA European League. Entering into the first round, they would lose both legs of their clash against USK Prague. Internally, history would repeat itself during the 1992–93 season with a second consecutive title, again beating Dinamo in the final.

For the 1993–94 season, Gheorghe Roman would fully take charge as head coach. During that campaign, Studenții suffered some setbacks, with short and long-term injuries keeping key players (Sinevici, Cristescu, Olpretean) out of action for some matches. The team managed to reach the play-off final again, going into the best-of-five final clash against Dinamo without home-court advantage. This would prove decisive in the end, Dinamo winning the final 3–2. The following season, the team came in third, representing the first season in five years in which they did not reach the final. By then, the team had the financial support of SM Invest (playing under the name "U" SM Invest), which would go on to bring much needed resources heading into the 1995–96 season. Decisive would also prove to be the appointment of Dragan Petričević as head coach in January 1996, the Bosnian becoming the first ever foreigner to coach in Romania, at only 27 years old. Everything culminated in a best-of-five play-off final against Steaua Bucharest. It was 1–1 after the first two games in Cluj, and 2–2 after the next two games in Bucharest. The decider took place back in Cluj, in front of a sold-out crowd at the Horia Demian Sports Hall. The match ended 86–75 in favour of the home team, Universitatea becoming Romanian champions for the third time. What followed was another participation in the newly rebranded FIBA EuroCup, with no notable results. In January 1997, after just one year spent coaching Universitatea, Dragan Petričević decided to leave the club, signing a contract with Politehnica Iași.

After this period of success, the team went through times of unrest and concern. Beginning with the 1997–98 season, the city of Cluj had two teams in Divizia A: Carbochim and Universitatea (now under the name ”U” Sanex Cluj-Napoca). The White and Blacks ended that year's championship in sixth, while Carbochim finished in third. The two teams merged that summer, under the name “U”Carbochim Cluj-Napoca, while ex-player Gabriel Olpretean took over as head coach. Studenții managed a third-place finish in the 1998–99 season, to end a decade in which they managed seven top three finishes, including three Romanian Championship titles.

=== Parting ways with the parent club. Influx of foreign players (2000-2010) ===
The turn of the new millennium saw a lot of changes for the club, which were going to impact its future both in terms of performances and identity. Mircea Cristescu and Dorin Pintea returned to the club as players in January 2000. Cristescu retired that summer, becoming the new team manager, while Pintea later took on the role of assistant coach after ending his playing career. However, the biggest change would happen in the summer of 2001, when the basketball team parted ways with the parent sports club, going under the care of a private investiture. This decision was motivated as a way to facilitate the growth of the team, which had its prospects limited under the umbrella of the parent club. The basketball club kept its tie with the Universitatea Cluj brand through a collaboration protocol signed with the sports club in 2009 and later through an image partnership agreed with FC Universitatea Cluj in 2017. However, the parent club later chose to reestablish its basketball section, claiming all the trophies won before the split as part of its own records.

The beginning of the 2000s also saw the first additions of foreign players to the team's roster, Serbian swingman Dejan Dukovčić becoming the first foreigner in history to represent the club, in 2002. Other players from former Yugoslav countries would join the club in the following years; like Predrag Mijušković, Zoran Krstanović, Miljan Medvedj and Branko Ćuić, while LeVar Seals became the first ever American to play for Cluj, in 2005. This period would also see the addition of a number of younger players to the roster, formed at CSS Viitorul Cluj under the tutelage of Voicu Moldovan: Paul Chetreanu, Mihai Racovițan, and most notably Mihai Silvășan, who would become the captain and later head coach of the team.

During this transitional period the results were mixed, the team finishing as high as fourth in the domestic championship. However, this result; obtained during the 2004–05 season, meant a return to continental competitions after nine years, The White and Blacks entering to compete in the FIBA EuroCup Challenge for the 2005–06 season. The summer of 2005 also saw the return of Bruno Roschnafsky to the team, after he played in Germany for thirteen years. Under the command of head coach Miodrag Perišić, the team managed one win and three losses in the regular season of the EuroCup Challenge. Domestically, they reached the final of the Romanian Cup, while coming second in the league championship. The following season, the students (now playing under the name U-Mobitelco Cluj-Napoca) one-upped themselves in European competitions, performance facilitated by a number of signings, including Marcel Ţenter, who (like Roschnafsky the previous summer) returned to the club from Germany. Finishing the regular season of the 2006–07 FIBA EuroCup Challenge first in their group, with four wins and two losses, the team from Cluj reached the quarterfinal stage, where they lost both legs of their clash against Apollon Limassol. Individually, LeVar Seals ended up as the competition's top scorer, with an average of 22.9 points-per-game. Following the 2006–07 season, Bruno Roschnafsky left the club in order to form his own basketball team: BC Gladiator, while Marcel Ţenter retired as a player, becoming one of Perišić's assistant coaches, alongside Dorin Pintea.

==== 2007-2008 season: Baldwin's coaching leaves its mark on the team ====
In 2007, the EuroCup Challenge was abolished, which meant that the Cluj team entered to compete in the second preliminary round of the FIBA EuroCup, for the 2007-08 season. This was less significant on the court; U-Mobitelco losing both legs of their clash against PAOK Thessaloniki, but more significant off it, PAOK's head coach Tab Baldwin choosing to quit the Greek team and join Cluj in December. Baldwin; who managed to lead the New Zealand national basketball team to a FIBA World Cup semifinal in 2002, later said that he decided to join Cluj because he was impressed with the club's fans, structure and hunger for performances, while being disappointed with PAOK's lack of direction for their club.

Domestically, the influence of the American head coach showed on the court, U-Mobitelco finishing the regular season of the league championship with ten wins on the bounce. In the play-offs, The White and Blacks defeated Gaz Metan Mediaș in the quarterfinals and CSU Sibiu in the semifinals (losing once against each of them), to set up a best-of-seven final against CSU Asesoft Ploiești. Going into the final without home-court advantage, U-Mobitelco managed to win Game 1 in Ploiești, 72–81, but later lost Game 4 in Cluj, 75–82. From there, both teams would win their home games, the final ending in Ploiești, following an 82–66 win for Asesoft in Game 7. In terms of individual awards for the campaign, LeVar Seals and Zoran Krstanović were included into the All-Romanian League first team, Mihai Silvășan was elected as the league's Most Improved Player of the Year, while Brad Buckman (who joined the team in January) was the league's statistical leader in blocks.

==== 2008-2009 season: Setbacks and injuries ====
The summer of 2008 saw a major reshaping of the team's roster in terms of foreign players, Branko Ćuić being the only one who would remain from the previous campaign. LeVar Seals and Miljan Medvedj joined CS Otopeni, while Buckman and Krstanović left to play for teams in Cyprus and the Netherlands. In their place, the club signed no less than six new foreign players, including Adrian Majstrovich and Leon Henry; who joined from the New Zealand NBL, Aleksandar Glintić from Serbia, and Matt Gibson; who played the previous campaign in Venezuela. In terms of domestic players, Levente Szijarto joined from Asesoft Ploiești. Unfortunately, the on court chemistry between the new signings was difficult to achieve, U-Mobitelco missing two of their primary objectives early in the campaign, by being eliminated from the FIBA EuroChallenge by EWE Baskets Oldenburg, and from the Romanian Cup by Asesoft Ploiești.

From there, injuries and roster changes would become the norm for the season. Adrian Majstrovich left at the beginning of November, after just three months spent with the club, while Glintić and Mike Kinsella were sidelined with injuries, both of them leaving before the end of the calendar year. The same happened with the American center Steve Rich, who joined the club in November to cover for Glintić's absence, but later suffered an injury himself, leaving the club in December. The winter break saw the return of Zoran Krstanović from the Netherlands, while American center Terrence Roberts and Croatian guard Damir Milačić were added to the team's roster.

Unfortunately, a 79–72 defeat against Gaz Metan Mediaș in the final game of the regular season meant that U-Mobitelco would enter the play-off from the fifth position, without home-court advantage. Another injury, suffered by Terrence Roberts would prove decisive in the end, The White and Blacks being eliminated from the play-off quarterfinals by CSU Sibiu. The end of the season saw the departure of Tab Baldwin and the appointment of Marcel Ţenter as head coach.

==== 2009-2010 season: Central European Basketball League runners-up ====
At the start of the new campaign, most of the foreign players brought the previous summer left, Ćuić and Krstanović opting to stay with the team. Levente Szijarto returned to Asesoft Ploiești. Miljan Medvedj returned from CS Otopeni, David Lawrence joined from Pitești, while Vladan Jocović was a late roster addition at the end of August. Due to the Great Recession, the team chose not to register for the 2009-10 edition of the FIBA EuroChallenge, instead entering to compete in the second edition of the Central European Basketball League, which contained teams in closer geographical proximity with the city of Cluj. "U" Mobitelco managed to win all four games during the group stage, home and away against both BK Prostějov and Albacomp Fehérvár. The final four took place in Cluj, in early February. The White and Blacks managed to defeat Elba Timișoara in the semifinals, 73–64, but lost the final against Nový Jičín, 78–81, finishing the competition as runners-up. During the final, David Lawrence was taken out early with a knee injury, which later caused him to miss the remainder of the season. In his place, Kyndall Dykes was brought to the team, while Vladan Jocović was dropped to make room for the addition of Robert Thomson.

Domestically, "U" Mobitelco reached the quarterfinal stage of the Romanian Cup, where they were eliminated by Asesoft Ploiești. In the Romanian league, the team finished the regular season in first place, losing just five times and managing to beat Asesoft both home and away. The opponents in the play-off quarterfinals were BC Mureș. The team from Târgu Mureș managed to push the series to Game 5 by winning its home games, but "U" Mobitelco took the decider in Cluj, 85–58. In the semifinals, the Cluj team lost its first home game against Elba Timișoara, but later won the next three games in a row, to set up a new league final against Asesoft Ploiești. In Game 1, "U" Mobitelco lost at home, 76–77, with the winning basket for the opponents coming in the final seconds of the game. The second home game would also be lost, this time in a double overtime thriller: 111–113. From there, Asesoft would win its home games too, sweeping the final, 4–0. At the end of the regular season, Zoran Krstanović was elected as both the league's Player of the Year and Center of the Year, while also being included in the All-Romanian League first team, alongside Branko Ćuić.

=== Champions yet again. The beginning of the Silvășan era (2010-2020) ===
==== 2010-2011 season: Champions after fifteen years ====
The Cluj team began the 2010–11 season under a new name, "U" Mobitelco BT Cluj-Napoca, due to their partnership with the banking institution, Banca Transilvania. The team remained largely unchanged compared to the previous season, "U" Mobitelco strengthening their roster through the arrivals of Claudiu Fometescu from Dinamo Bucharest and Miloš Pesić from Elba Timișoara. Additionally, David Lawrence rejoined the team after recovering from the injury sustained the previous season. In terms of departures, Flavius Lăpuște left for BC Mureș, while Miljan Medvedj returned to CS Otopeni. In February, Tyler Morris joined the roster after being in trials with the club. For the second consecutive season, "U" Mobitelco decided to participate in the Central European Basketball League. Unfortunately, the withdrawal of several teams from the competition resulted in the team playing only two games before the league was canceled.

On the domestic front, the Cluj team was eliminated early from the Romanian Cup, losing both home and away against BC Mureș. In the national championship, the team lost six games during the regular season but secured second place and qualified for the play-offs. In the quarterfinals, they faced their regional rivals CSU Sibiu, winning the series by sweeping all three games. The semifinal series against Gaz Metan Mediaș proved much more challenging, with "U" Mobitelco securing a spot in the final only in Game 5, which they won 80–70. The opponents in the final were once again their rivals, Asesoft Ploiești. Although "U" Mobitelco began the series, played in a best-of-seven format, without home-court advantage, the team managed to win Game 1 on their rival's court with a score of 79–89. They then secured victories in Games 3 and 4 on their home court. Asesoft's win in Game 5 brought the series back to Cluj, where "U" Mobitelco had the chance to claim the championship title in Game 6, in front of their own fans. The match, played in front of 4,000 spectators at the Horia Demian Sports Hall, was a tense affair, marked by many missed shots and turnovers on both sides, remaining evenly balanced until the final seconds. With three seconds left on the clock and the score tied at 61-61, Tyler Morris grabbed a rebound under his own basket and dribbled toward the opposing half. He then launched a shot from beyond the halfway line, which banked in to set the final score at 64–61, securing the fourth championship title in the history of the Cluj team and their first in fifteen years.

==== 2011-2012 season: Another campaign plagued by injuries ====
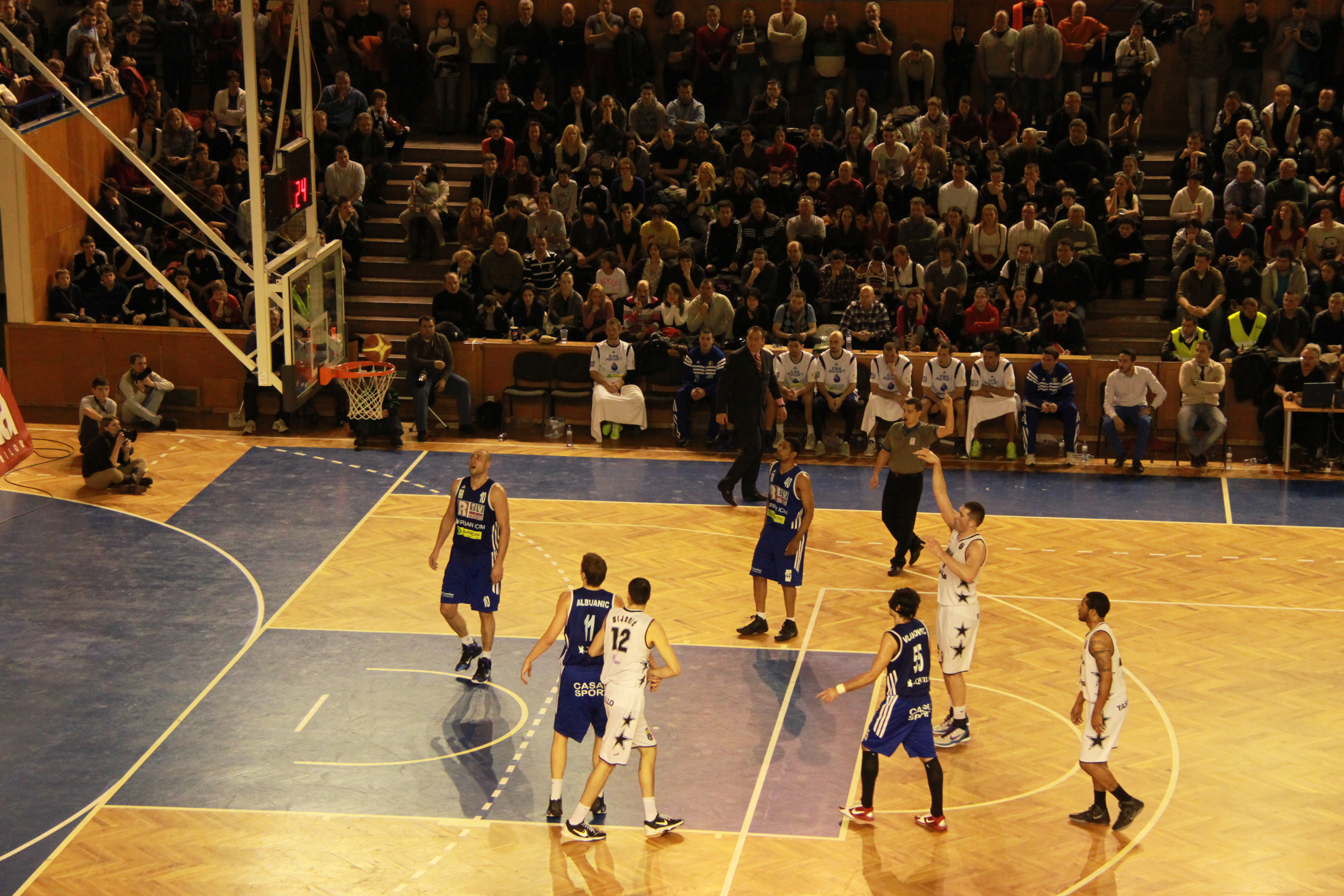
Home game against CSU Asesoft Ploiești, at the Horia Demian Sports Hall, during the 2011-12 season.

Following their title win in the previous season, “U” Mobitelco entered the 2011-12 edition of the FIBA EuroChallenge. The draw placed the Cluj team in a challenging group alongside France's Élan Chalon, Belgium's Antwerp Giants, and Russia's Enisey. Cluj aimed to retain as much of their roster from the previous season as possible, with the only notable departures being Branko Ćuić and Claudiu Fometescu. Unfortunately, in early October, Robert Thomson decided to retire from basketball, and his spot on the team was filled by Serbian center Vladimir Mijović. In the Romanian Cup, “U” Mobitelco was once again eliminated early by Gaz Metan Mediaș, despite securing a 56–55 victory in the second leg at the Horia Demian Sports Hall. Their European campaign began with two losses: a home defeat to Élan Chalon and an away loss to Antwerp Giants. However, they achieved a victory in Russia against Enisey, 73–81. Unfortunately, Cluj lost the remaining three group-stage matches, exiting the competition with a record of five losses and one win.

Towards the end of the year, the team faced a serious injury crisis. On November 18, Paul Chetreanu was injured during a loss to Energia Rovinari. Later, Tyler Morris suffered a cruciate ligament tear in the return match against Antwerp Giants in Cluj. In December, team captain Silvășan joined the injury list and was sidelined for the next four months. To bolster their roster, Cluj signed Jerome LaGrange as a point guard and Phillip Jones, an American center also capable of playing as a power forward. Despite the injuries and constant roster changes, “U” Mobitelco managed to qualify for the play-offs, finishing the regular season in third place with a 20–8 record. The Cluj team won their quarterfinal series against BC Mureș, 3–1. However, they were swept in the semifinals by BC Timișoara, losing all three games, and ended the championship in fourth place after falling to Gaz Metan Mediaș in the bronze-medal match. At the end of the season, head coach Marcel Țenter decided to leave the team, and Nikša Bavčević took over as the new head coach.

==== 2012-2013 season: Rebuilding under Nikša Bavčević ====
The preseason under new head coach Nikša Bavčević focused on rebuilding the roster. The White and Blacks chose to promote several academy juniors to the first team, including young Nandor Kuti, while Cătălin Baciu returned to Cluj after finishing his college career in the United States. Regarding foreign players, the Cluj squad was joined by Canadian Steve Ross and Estonian international Reinar Hallik. Croatian Vedran Nakić took over the point guard position, American John Ofoegbu, MVP of the Bulgarian league in the previous season, was brought in as the center, and Sean Barnette completed the team's acquisitions. From the previous season's squad, Tyler Morris returned after recovering from the injury he suffered the year before. Unfortunately, early preseason injuries to Steve Ross and Tyler Morris led to further roster changes, with American Derek Wright and Bulgarian Hristo Nikolov brought in as replacements. Additionally, Ofoegbu was replaced before the start of the season by Montenegrin Ivan Todorović.

In the Romanian Cup, The Red Caps reached the quarterfinals despite a loss to CSȘ Giurgiu, after defeating Dinamo and CSM Bucharest in the first round. In the league, however, Cluj had a tough first half of the season, finishing December in seventh place with a 9–6 record. The end of the regular season's first half brought further roster changes. Tyler Morris decided to retire, Reinar Hallik left the team to sign with SCM U Craiova, and Ivan Todorović was removed from the squad due to poor performances. On the arrivals side, Dalibor Đapa was signed as a center, and Mihai Paul was also brought back to the team.

Despite losing 76–70 away to Oradea in the first leg, Cluj advanced in the Romanian Cup after defeating them 75–61 at the Horia Demian Sports Hall. This result marked "U" Mobitelco's first qualification for the Romanian Cup Final Four in seven years. The Students went on to defeat Asesoft Ploiești 90–74 in the semifinals before losing 62–76 in the final against Gaz Metan Mediaș, finishing as runners-up. In the league, "U" Mobitelco finished the regular season in seventh place, facing CSM Oradea in the playoff quarterfinals. The White and Blacks managed to win Game 2 in Oradea (67–68), bringing the series back to Cluj tied at 1-1. Unfortunately, the team lost both home games against Oradea, losing the series 1-3 and ending their season prematurely in late April.

==== 2013-2014 season: Dorin Pintea becomes head coach ====
The 2013-14 preseason marked another head coaching change for "U" BT Mobitelco, with Dorin Pintea getting the opportunity to lead the team after Nikša Bavčević’s departure. Other changes in the Cluj-based club’s technical staff included Paul Chetreanu’s appointment as an assistant coach following his retirement as a player and the hiring of Milorad Perović as the team’s technical director. Regarding the player roster, The White and Blacks parted ways with all foreign players from the previous season, as well as Romanian international Mihai Paul. In terms of new signings, the team brought in Americans Darius Hargrove and Josh Sparks, Serbian small forward Ivan Kuburović, and Montenegrin center Boris Lalović. Additionally, Branko Ćuić and Miljan Medvedj returned to the squad, while youth players Mirel Dragoste and Cristian Anghel were promoted to the senior team.

In the Romanian Cup, "U" BT Mobitelco Cluj advanced to the quarterfinals after an 83-70 home victory against SCM U Craiova, overturning a four-point first-leg deficit. Unfortunately, their journey in the competition ended in the quarterfinals after two double-digit losses to BCM U Pitești. These defeats had consequences, as the club decided to part ways with Milorad Perović, and some players faced financial penalties. In the national championship, the season started with mixed results, with "U" BT Mobitelco finishing the first half of the regular season with an 8-5 record. However, after their Cup elimination, the team showed improved form, winning all their games in the first two months of 2014. During this period, American point guard Lawrence Westbrook temporarily joined the team to cover for Miljan Medvedj’s injury. Unfortunately, a four-game losing streak in March resulted in a fifth-place finish at the end of the regular season.

In the playoff quarterfinals, they faced arch-rivals CSU Sibiu, who had home-court advantage after finishing fourth. Sibiu won the first two games of the series before the action moved to Cluj. In response, "U" BT Mobitelco won both of their home games, forcing a decisive Game 5 at Sibiu’s Sala Transilvania. The hero of the game was Cluj captain Mihai Silvășan, who delivered a monster performance with 24 points, 5 rebounds, and 3 assists, capped by a game-winning three-pointer in the final seconds to seal his team’s victory. In the semifinals, The White and Blacks faced their old rivals, Asesoft Ploiești. Cluj managed to steal Game 1 on the road, tying the series at 1-1. However, they missed the opportunity to reach the finals after suffering a heartbreaking 85-87 home loss in Game 4, followed by another defeat in the decisive Game 5 in Ploiești. In the bronze medal series, The White and Blacks were decisively beaten in both games by BC Mureș, ultimately finishing the season in fourth place.

==== 2014-2015 season: The first season in the BTarena. Mihai Silvășan retires ====
The Cluj-Napoca team began the 2014–2015 season under a new name, U-Banca Transilvania Cluj-Napoca, following the end of the collaboration protocol with the Universitatea Cluj Sports Club and the departure of sponsor Mobitelco. Changes to the roster included the signings of Andrei Mandache and Zoran Cvjetković, as well as the departure of Josh Sparks and Ivan Kuburović. Additionally, Sean Barnette and Tudor Jucan were brought back to the team. American point guard Curtis Millage joined the squad later, in October.

After a three-year absence, The White and Blacks returned to European competition by participating in the FIBA EuroChallenge, where they were drawn into a group alongside Turkish side Trabzonspor, Austrian champions UBC Güssing Knights, and Hungarian runners-up Atomerőmű Paks. The home game against Trabzonspor marked the team’s debut in BTarena, in front of over 5,000 spectators. U-BT Cluj-Napoca finished the group stage with a 1–5 record. Their sole victory came in the final game, an 81–68 away win over Atomerőmű, but it was not enough to continue in the competition.

Domestically, the season began with a major disappointment, as The White and Blacks were eliminated in the first round of the Romanian Cup by BC Timișoara. The start of the national league was also rough, with the team losing six of their first eight games. These poor results led to a change in the coaching staff, with Marcel Țenter returning as head coach in November. Later, Dorin Pintea rejoined the staff as assistant coach. There were further changes to the roster as Miljan Medvedj left the team at the end of November. During the winter break, U-BT Cluj added American players Frank Turner and Jonathan Jones to the squad, while Zoran Cvjetković left the team and transferred to Germany. These changes revitalized the team’s performance, with The White and Blacks losing only two more games in the remainder of the regular season. A key win in the final round; 92–84 away against BC Mureș, secured third place in the standings and home-court advantage in the play-off quarterfinal series against the same Mureș team. Unfortunately, the season ended in disappointment, as The White and Blacks were swept by BC Mureș in the quarterfinals. The end of the season also brought sad news for Cluj fans: team captain Mihai Silvășan announced his retirement due to recurring back injuries.

==== 2015-2016 season: Romanian Cup winners after twenty years ====
The new season brought an almost complete overhaul of the foreign player contingent, with the only one remaining from the previous campaign being the American Darius Hargrove. The new names in the Cluj roster were Filip Adamović, Muhamed Pašalić, Ivan Žigeranović, Karamo Jawara, Andrei Kalnichenko, and Rolland Török. The transfer campaign also marked the return of Kyndall Dykes to the team after three years. Former captain Mihai Silvășan became Marcel Țenter’s assistant coach on the bench, while Tudor Jucan was appointed the new team captain.

The team’s performances in the national championship were marked by inconsistency, as The White and Blacks managed to defeat all title contenders during the regular season, while at the same time losing seemingly easy games, including against newly promoted sides Phoenix Galați and Dinamo Bucharest. The lack of team chemistry and injuries sustained throughout the season led to further roster changes: Darius Hargrove and Karamo Jawara departed, while Adrian Guțoaia and Branko Jorović joined. After a promising start in the Cluj jersey, the latter also suffered an injury and was replaced by Miroslav Todić.

In the Romanian Cup, U-BT Cluj-Napoca overcame Phoenix Galați and BCM U Pitești in the first two rounds to qualify for the Final Four, held in Oradea. After a 73–67 semifinal victory over BC Mureș, their opponents in the final were the hosts, CSM Oradea. Led by an excellent performance from Filip Adamović, the Cluj side managed to triumph at the Antonio Alexe Sports Hall, winning the Romanian Cup trophy after a twenty year break.

In the national championship playoffs, Cluj managed to get past CSU Sibiu in the quarterfinals, winning their home games and sealing the series 3–1 with a Game 4 victory away against their rivals. In the semifinals, CSM Oradea took revenge for their loss in the Romanian Cup final, winning the series after a dominant 76–56 victory in Game 4 in Cluj. The third-place final brought two more defeats for The White and Blacks, this time against Steaua Bucharest, with the team finishing the season in fourth place.

=== Domestic dominance and European success (2020-present) ===
==== 2021–22 season: Basketball Champions League Quarter-finalists ====
In the 2021-22 season, U-BT Cluj achieved a great performance in the Basketball Champions League , reaching the quarterfinals, where they lost the decisive match against MHP Riesen Ludwigsburg in front of a full stadium. The Cluj team won another Romanian championship title this season.

==== 2022–present: Participation in EuroCup ====
U-BT Cluj started the 2022-23 season with a quite different squad compared to last year, playing its first match in the Liga Națională (men's basketball) against CSM Ploiești. At the same time, the team begins its adventure in the second most valuable competition in Europe, the EuroCup during the season. In the domestic championship, U-BT qualifies for the Play-offs, and on a European level, it finishes 9th out of 10 in Group B of the EuroCup. After a final that started with a bang against CSM Oradea , U-BT manaded to come back from 0-2 down to 4-2 overall, thus becoming the Romanian champion again on home soil in front of a sold-out arena.

In the 2023–24 season, U-BT Cluj continued its successful run in national and international competitions, consolidating its position as a leader in the world of Romanian basketball. Starting the season with a mix of experienced players (recently transferred or already in the squad), U-BT Cluj managed to impress both locally and internationally. In the National Men's Basketball League of Romania , U-BT dominated the competition, occupying first place in the overall standings (16-0), winning all matches. Qualified in the play-offs, they continued their perfect run (18-0) and reached the final. The Cluj team won the first two matches at home and the series moved to Oradea. There, the Bihor team manages to win one of the two matches and also record the only defeat for the "red caps" in the 2023–24 Liga Națională season, with the decisive match to be played in Cluj on May 23, 2024. U-BT Cluj managed to win the title for the fourth consecutive year in front of a sold-out arena and in a spectacular atmosphere.

Internationally, U-BT played for the second year in a row in the second strongest basketball competition in Europe. The players trained by Mihai Silvășan manage to win an unexpected number of matches, finishing in 2nd place in Group B (13 wins, 5 losses). Thus, thanks to the new format, they reach the quarterfinals of the competition, where they were defeated by the London Lions team (79-91), in front of a sold-out arena, at the same time writing a new chapter in the history of Romanian basketball.

== Players and head coaches ==
=== Current roster ===
U-BT Cluj-Napoca roster
Players
Coaches

Pos.	No.	Nat.	Name	Ht.	Wt.	Age
PG	0	(United States)	Livingston II, Otis	1.80 m (5 ft 11 in)	80 kg (176 lb)	30 – 12 October 1996
CG	1	(United States)	Smart, Javonte	1.93 m (6 ft 4 in)	93 kg (205 lb)	27 – 3 June 1999
PG	2	(Romania)	Bernat, Thomas	1.91 m (6 ft 3 in)	80 kg (176 lb)	16 – 5 December 2009
PF	3	(Serbia)	Beslać, Dušan (injured)	2.06 m (6 ft 9 in)	103 kg (227 lb)	28 – 6 October 1998
PG	7	(Romania)	Cepoi, Andrei	1.86 m (6 ft 1 in)	75 kg (165 lb)	18 – 9 October 2008
PF	8	(United States)	McCreary, Jalyn	2.01 m (6 ft 7 in)	102 kg (225 lb)	26 – 19 September 2000
SF	11	(Romania)	Câmpean, Alexandru	1.92 m (6 ft 4 in)	86 kg (190 lb)	17 – 8 May 2009
F/C	13	(United States)	Bishop, Christian	2.01 m (6 ft 7 in)	100 kg (220 lb)	27 – 13 June 1999
G/F	20	(United States)	Bess, Javon	1.98 m (6 ft 6 in)	100 kg (220 lb)	30 – 1 April 1996
G/F	21	(United States)	Hill, Malcolm	1.98 m (6 ft 6 in)	100 kg (220 lb)	31 – 26 October 1995
C	22	(Serbia)	Plavšić, Uroš	2.16 m (7 ft 1 in)	120 kg (265 lb)	27 – 22 December 1998
SF	24	(Romania)	Nicolescu, Bogdan	1.99 m (6 ft 6 in)	89 kg (196 lb)	29 – 3 January 1997
C	32	(Romania)	Tancău, Tudor	2.06 m (6 ft 9 in)	97 kg (214 lb)	17 – 2 January 2009
SG	35	(United States) (Romania)	Richard, Patrick (C)	1.96 m (6 ft 5 in)	93 kg (205 lb)	36 – 25 January 1990
CG	77	(Estonia)	Kullamäe, Kristian	1.94 m (6 ft 4 in)	85 kg (187 lb)	27 – 25 May 1999
PG		(United States)	Walker, Leland	1.85 m (6 ft 1 in)	84 kg (185 lb)	23 – 12 April 2003
PG	88	(Romania)	Illeș, Luca	1.95 m (6 ft 5 in)	90 kg (198 lb)	19 – 8 January 2007

Head coach

- (Romania) Mihai Silvășan

Assistant coach(es)

- (United States) Isaac Jenkins
- (Serbia) Mihajlo Markovic
- (Romania) Mihai Popa

General manager

- (Serbia) (Romania) Branko Ćuić

Team manager

- (Romania) Răzvan Cenean

Legend

- (C) Team captain
- (IN) Inactive
- Injured

- Roster
- Transactions
Updated: August 19, 2026

=== Depth chart ===
Pos.	Starting 5	Bench 1	Bench 2	Bench 3	Inactive
C	Uroš Plavšić	Christian Bishop	Tudor Tancău
PF	Jalyn McCreary	Bogdan Nicolescu			Dušan Beslać (injured)
SF	Javon Bess	Malcolm Hill		Alexandru Câmpean
SG	Kristian Kullamäe	Patrick Richard	Andrei Cepoi
PG	Javonte Smart	Otis Livingston II	Luca Illeș	Thomas Bernat

=== Notable players ===
Note: Flags indicate national team eligibility at FIBA-sanctioned events. Players may hold other non-FIBA nationalities not displayed.

Criteria

To appear in this section a player must have either:

- Set a club record or won an individual award while at the club
- Played at least one official international match for their national team at any time
- Played at least one official NBA match at any time.

- (Romania) Mihai Albu
- (Romania) Cătălin Baciu
- (Romania) Mircea Barna
- (Romania) Emanuel Cățe
- (Romania) Horia Demian
- (Romania) Claudiu Fometescu
- (Romania) Ștefan Grasu
- (Romania) Nandor Kuti
- (Romania) Rareș Mandache
- (Romania) Vlad Moldoveanu
- (Romania) Gheorghe Mureșan
- (Romania) Gheorghe Roman
- (Romania) (Germany) Bruno Roschnafski
- (Romania) Matei Rührig
- (Romania) Mihai Silvășan
- (Romania) Rolland Török
- (Romania) Marcel Țenter
- (Romania) Nicolae Viciu
- (Romania) Imre Vizi
- (Australia) Mitch Creek
- (Bosnia and Herzegovina) Filip Adamović
- (Bosnia and Herzegovina) Nemanja Gordić
- (Bosnia and Herzegovina) Muhamed Pašalić
- (Bosnia and Herzegovina) Andrija Stipanović
- (Brazil) Léonardo Meindl
- (Bulgaria) Stanimir Marinov
- (Croatia) Darko Planinić
- (Croatia) Željko Šakić
- (Croatia) Karlo Žganec
- (Cuba) Karel Guzmán
- (Finland) Sasu Salin
- (France) Adam Mokoka
- (Latvia) Artis Ate
- (Latvia) Mareks Mejeris
- (Lithuania) Vaidas Kariniauskas
- (Lithuania) Donatas Tarolis
- (Panama) Iverson Molinar
- (Senegal) Ousmane Barro
- (Serbia) Stefan Birčević
- (Serbia) (Romania) Branko Ćuić
- (Serbia) Branko Jorović
- (Serbia) Zoran Krstanović
- (Serbia) Dušan Miletić
- (Serbia) Aleksandar Rašić
- (Slovenia) Miha Lapornik
- (Sweden) Jeffery Taylor
- (Ukraine) Maksym Zvonov
- (United States) Brandon Brown
- (United States) Brad Buckman
- (United States) Kyndall Dykes
- (United States) Jarell Eddie
- (United States) Zach Hankins
- (United States) Bryce Jones
- (United States) Jalen Jones
- (United States) (Romania) Patrick Richard
- (United States) (Romania) Daron Russell
- (United States) D. J. Seeley
- (United States) Zavier Simpson
- (United States) Elijah Stewart
- (United States) (Rwanda) Robert Thomson
- (United States) Jason Washburn
- (United States) (Romania) Giordan Watson

=== Head coaches ===
Period	Coach
1950–52	(Romania) Francisc Barabás
1953	(Romania) Vasile Chiorean
1954–58	(Romania) Gheorghe Rusu
1958–61	(Romania) Alexandru Șerban
1961–65	(Romania) (Hungary) Elemér Sárosi
1965–72	(Romania) Mircea Bugnariu
1972–82	(Romania) Vasile Geleriu
1982–86	(Romania) Gheorghe Roman
1986–87	(Romania) Vasile Mureşan
1987–89	(Romania) Gheorghe Roman
1989–94	(Romania) Gheorghe Roman & Liviu Morariu
1994–96	(Romania) Gheorghe Roman
1996–97	(Bosnia and Herzegovina) Dragan Petričević

Period	Coach
1997–98	(Romania) Horea Rotaru
1998–00	(Romania) Gabriel Olpretean
2000–01	(Romania) Dan Moraru
2001–05	(Romania) Horea Rotaru
2005–07	(Serbia) Miodrag Perišić
2007–09	(United States) Tab Baldwin
2009–12	(Romania) Marcel Țenter
2012–13	(Croatia) Nikša Bavčević
2013–14	(Romania) Dorin Pintea
2014–16	(Romania) Marcel Țenter
2016–19	(Romania) Mihai Silvășan
2019–21	(Romania) Mihai Silvășan & (Serbia) Duško Vujošević
2021–present	(Romania) Mihai Silvășan

== Fans and rivalries ==
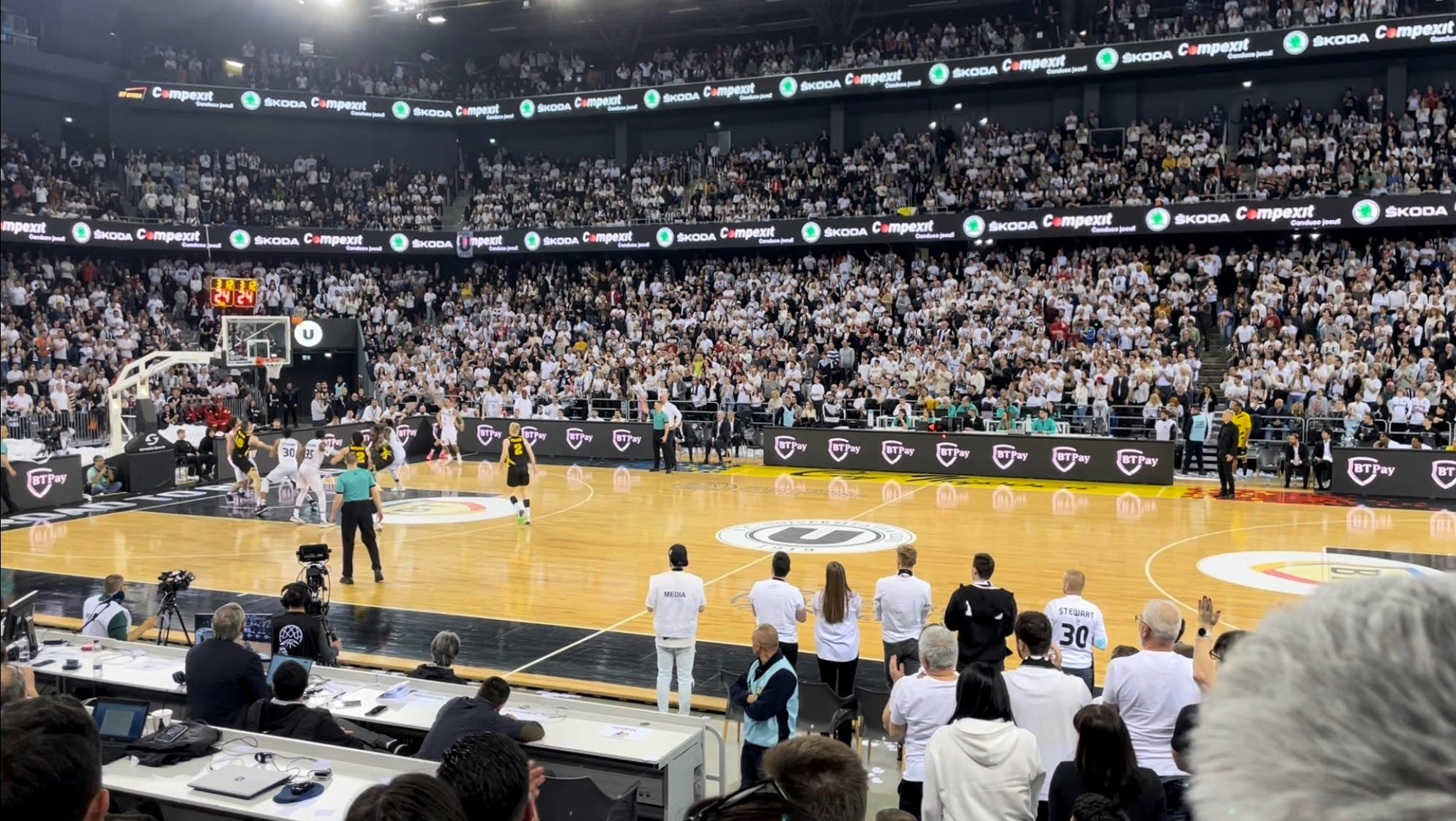
Sold-out crowd at the BTarena, during the 2021-22 Basketball Champions League quarterfinals

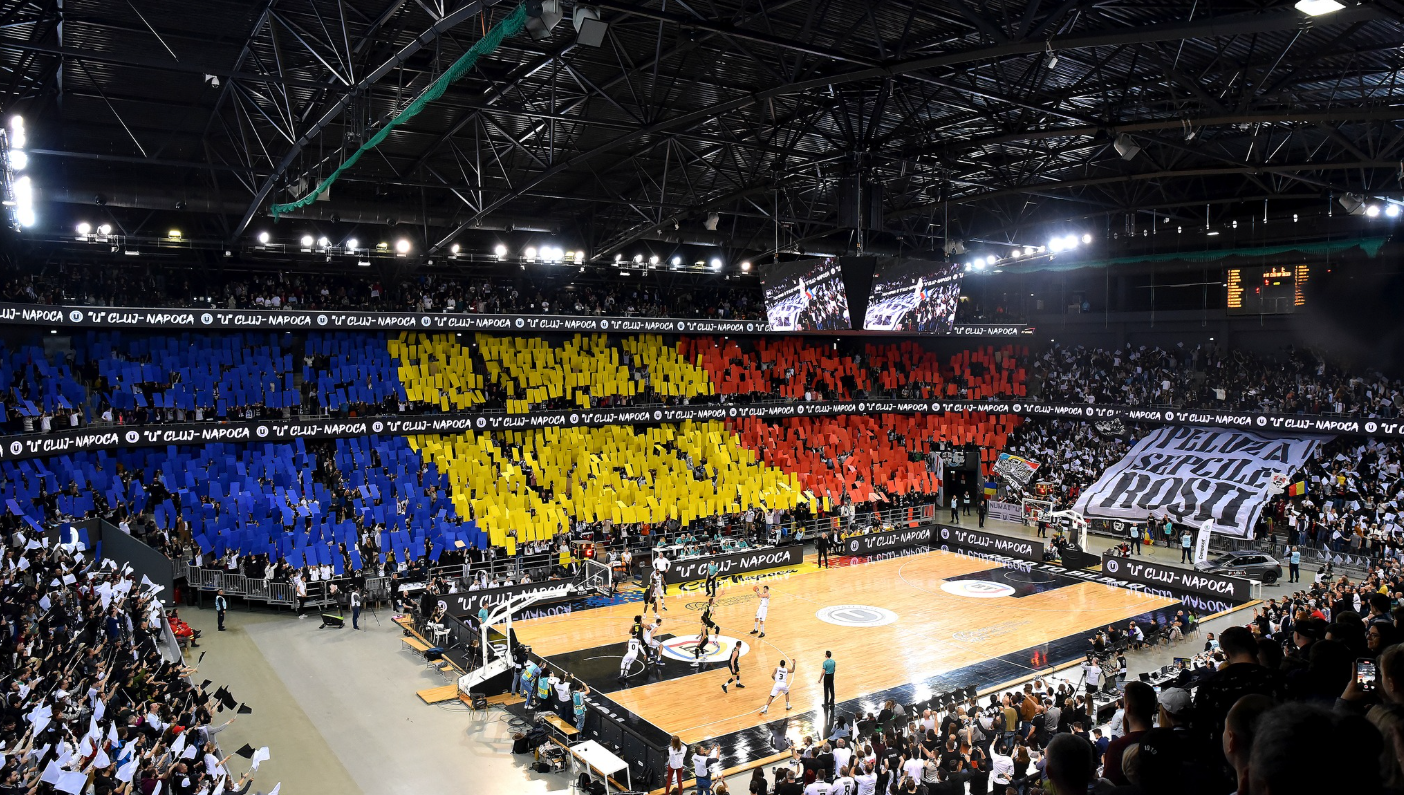
U-BT Cluj fans displaying the Romanian flag and a tifo at the match against MHP Ludwigsburg on April 5, 2022.

U-BT Cluj-Napoca has the largest basketball fanbase in Romania, with over 4,000 season ticket holders as of the 2026–27 season. The club holds the attendance record for an indoor sporting event in Romania, performance achieved for the first time during their two home matches against MHP Riesen Ludwigsburg in the quarterfinals of the 2021–22 Basketball Champions League, when capacity crowds of 10,000 filled the BTarena in both games. Since then, the club has managed to draw capacity crowds at the BTarena quite often at their games in EuroCup, but also at their domestic league play-off games. The domestic rivalries of U-BT Cluj-Napoca are mainly driven by performances, the club being a challenger for domestic silverware from as early as the 1950s:

- The rivalry against CSM Oradea. Following the dissolution of CSU Asesoft Ploiești, the battle for national supremacy in Romanian basketball has been contested between U-BT Cluj-Napoca and CSM Oradea, every league title since 2016 being won by either one of them. The two clubs have played in four championship play-off finals against each other, these games often drawing capacity crowds at both the Oradea Arena and the BTarena.
- The rivalry against CSU Sibiu. This is more of a regional rivalry, Cluj-Napoca and Sibiu being the largest cities in the Transylvania region. Therefore, the matches between the two teams are often called The derby of Transylvania. Like Cluj, CSU Sibiu has a large basketball fanbase.
- Rivalries against teams from Bucharest. During the twentieth century, Cluj's main rivals for domestic supremacy were Steaua and Dinamo Bucharest, the two teams from the capital sharing between them all the league titles contested from 1953 to 1991. In recent seasons, a minor rivalry was ignited between The White and Blacks and CSO Voluntari, the two teams contesting the 2021 and 2022 editions of the Romanian Supercup against each other.

== Season by season ==
Season	Domestic League		ABA League	Romanian Cup	Other Cups		European competitions		
↓ As part of the Universitatea Cluj multi sports club ↓
1990–91	1 Divizia A	2nd	—N/a		—N/a		3 Korać Cup	R1	
1991–92	1 Divizia A	1st	—N/a		—N/a		2 FIBA European Cup	R2	
1992–93	1 Divizia A	1st	—N/a		—N/a		1 FIBA European League	R1	
1993–94	1 Divizia A	2nd	—N/a		—N/a		1 FIBA European League	R1	
1994–95	1 Divizia A	3rd	—N/a	Champion	—N/a		2 FIBA European Cup	R2	
1995–96	1 Divizia A	1st	—N/a		—N/a		2 FIBA European Cup	R1	
1996–97	1 Divizia A		—N/a		—N/a		2 FIBA EuroCup	PGS	0–10
1997–98	1 Divizia A	6th	—N/a		—N/a		—N/a		
1998–99	1 Divizia A	3rd	—N/a		—N/a		—N/a		
1999–00	1 Divizia A	4th	—N/a		—N/a		—N/a		
2000–01	1 Divizia A	5th	—N/a		—N/a		—N/a		
↓ As a private basketball club ↓
2001–02	1 Divizia A	6th	—N/a		—N/a		—N/a		
2002–03	1 Divizia A	5th	—N/a		—N/a		—N/a		
2003–04	1 Divizia A	7th	—N/a		—N/a		—N/a		
2004–05	1 Divizia A	4th	—N/a		—N/a		—N/a		
2005–06	1 Divizia A	2nd	—N/a	Runner-up	—N/a		4 FIBA EuroCup Challenge	RS	1–3
2006–07	1 Divizia A	3rd	—N/a	Semifinals	—N/a		4 FIBA EuroCup Challenge	QF	4–4
2007–08	1 Divizia A	2nd	—N/a		—N/a		3 FIBA EuroChallenge	QR2	
2008–09	1 Divizia A	5th	—N/a	Eightfinals	—N/a		3 FIBA EuroChallenge	QR1	
2009–10	1 Divizia A	2nd	—N/a	Quarterfinals	—N/a		R Central European Basketball League	RU	5–1
2010–11	1 Divizia A	1st	—N/a	Eightfinals	—N/a		R Central European Basketball League	CX	2–0
2011–12	1 Divizia A	4th	—N/a	Eightfinals	—N/a		3 FIBA EuroChallenge	RS	1–5
2012–13	1 Liga Națională	7th	—N/a	Runner-up	—N/a		—N/a		
2013–14	1 Liga Națională	4th	—N/a	Quarterfinals	—N/a		—N/a		
2014–15	1 Liga Națională	5th	—N/a	Eightfinals	—N/a		3 FIBA EuroChallenge	RS	1–5
2015–16	1 Liga Națională	4th	—N/a	Champion	—N/a		—N/a		
2016–17	1 Liga Națională	1st	—N/a	Champion	Romanian Supercup	C	3 Basketball Champions League	QR2	
2016–17	1 Liga Națională	1st	—N/a	Champion	Romanian Supercup	C	4 FIBA Europe Cup	R2	7–5
2017–18	1 Liga Națională	3rd	—N/a	Champion	—N/a		3 Basketball Champions League	QR2	
2017–18	1 Liga Națională	3rd	—N/a	Champion	—N/a		4 FIBA Europe Cup	R16	8–6
2018–19	1 Liga Națională	3rd	—N/a	Semifinals	Romanian Supercup	C	4 FIBA Europe Cup	QR2	
2019–20	1 Liga Națională	CX	—N/a	Champion	—N/a		4 FIBA Europe Cup	QF	12–4
2020–21	1 Liga Națională	1st	—N/a	Semifinals	—N/a		3 Basketball Champions League	QR1	
2021–22	1 Liga Națională	1st	—N/a	Semifinals	Romanian Supercup	C	3 Basketball Champions League	QF	14–4
2022–23	1 Liga Națională	1st	—N/a	Champion	Romanian Supercup	C	2 EuroCup	RS	5–13
2023–24	1 Liga Națională	1st	—N/a	Champion	—N/a		2 EuroCup	QF	13–6
2024–25	1 Liga Națională	1st	—N/a	Quarterfinals	—N/a		2 EuroCup	QF	11–9
2025–26	1 Liga Națională	1st	Quarterfinals	Champion	Romanian Supercup	C	2 EuroCup	QF	10–10
2026–27	1 Liga Națională				—N/a		2 EuroCup		

== Individual awards ==
Note: Domestic awards shown here are in accordance with the Eurobasket.com website.

ABA League Ideal Starting Five

- Mitch Creek (2025-26)

All-EuroCup Second Team

- Patrick Richard, Emanuel Cățe (2023–24)
- Zavier Simpson (2024–25)
- Daron Russell, Mitch Creek (2025–26)

All-Basketball Champions League Second Team

- Elijah Stewart (2021-22)

EuroCup MVP of the Round

- Karel Guzmán, Emanuel Cățe (2023-24)
- Zavier Simpson, D. J. Seeley (2024-25)
- Dušan Miletić, Mitch Creek, Daron Russell, Iverson Molinar (2025-26)

Basketball Champions League MVP of the Month

- Brandon Brown (December 2021)

ABA League Player of the Month

- Dušan Miletić (November 2025)

EuroCup Top Scorer

- Daron Russell (2025–26)

EuroCup Assists Leader

- Zavier Simpson (2024–25)

FIBA EuroCup Challenge Top Scorer

- LeVar Seals (2006-07)

Romanian Basketball League MVP

- Zoran Krstanović (2009–10)
- Kyndall Dykes (2010–11, 2018-19)
- Elijah Stewart (2021-22)
- Emanuel Cățe (2023–24)

Romanian Basketball League Finals MVP

- Ousmane Barro (2017)
- Donatas Tarolis (2021)
- Patrick Richard (2022)
- Léonardo Meindl (2023)
- Bryce Jones (2024)
- Zavier Simpson (2025)
- Daron Russell (2026)

Romanian Cup Finals MVP

- Filip Adamović (2016)
- Aleksandar Rašić (2017)
- Ousmane Barro (2018)
- Donatas Tarolis (2020)
- Léonardo Meindl (2023)
- Jarell Eddie (2024)
- Dušan Miletić (2026)

Romanian Supercup MVP

- Jason Washburn (2018)
- Andrija Stipanović (2021)
- Patrick Richard (2022, 2025)

All-Romanian League First Team

- LeVar Seals (2007–08)
- Zoran Krstanović (2007–08, 2009–10, 2010–11, 2011–12)
- Branko Ćuić (2009–10)
- Kyndall Dykes (2010–11, 2015-16, 2018-19)
- Željko Šakić (2017-18)
- Jason Washburn (2018-19)
- Darko Planinić (2019-20)
- Patrick Richard (2019-20)
- Andrija Stipanović (2020-21)
- Donatas Tarolis (2020-21)
- Elijah Stewart (2021-22)
- Léonardo Meindl (2022-23)
- Emanuel Cățe (2023–24)
- Zach Hankins (2024–25)

Romanian League Coach of the Year

- Marcel Țenter (2010–11)
- Mihai Silvășan (2020-21, 2021-22, 2022-23, 2023-24, 2024-25, 2025-26)
- Duško Vujošević (2020-21)

Romanian League Center of the Year

- Zoran Krstanović (2009–10, 2010–11, 2011–12)
- Jason Washburn (2018-19)
- Darko Planinić (2019-20)
- Andrija Stipanović (2020-21)
- Emanuel Cățe (2023–24)
- Zach Hankins (2024–25)

Romanian League Guard of the Year

- Kyndall Dykes (2010–11, 2018-19)
- Elijah Stewart (2021-22)

Romanian League Forward of the Year

- Željko Šakić (2017-18)
- Patrick Richard (2019-20)
- Donatas Tarolis (2020-21)

Romanian League Assist Leader

- Derek Wright (2012-13)

Romanian League Blocks Leader

- Brad Buckman (2007–08)
- Emanuel Cățe (2022–23)

Romanian League Steals Leader

- Derek Wright (2012-13)

Romanian League Best Defender

- Derek Wright (2012-13)
- Emanuel Cățe (2022–23)

Romanian League Best Prospect of the Year

- Nandor Kuti (2013-14)
- Tudor Șomăcescu (2024-25)

Romanian League Most Improved Player

- Mihai Silvășan (2007–08)
- Cătălin Baciu (2013-14)

== Honours ==
Note: Years in italics indicate performances obtained as part of the Universitatea Cluj multi sports club, which are not officially recognised as being part of the current club's records.

=== Domestic competitions ===
- Liga Națională
  - Champion (11): 1992, 1993, 1996, 2011, 2017, 2021, 2022, 2023, 2024, 2025, 2026
  - Runners-up (7) (Note: Four times runners-up as part of the Universitatea Cluj multi sports club, three times runners-up as a private basketball club.): 1959, 1962, 1991, 1994, 2006, 2008, 2010
  - Third place (14) (Note: Eleven times on third place as part of the Universitatea Cluj multi sports club, three times on third place as a private basketball club.): 1960, 1963, 1966, 1967, 1970, 1973, 1976, 1977, 1978, 1995, 1999, 2007, 2018, 2019
- Romanian Cup
  - Champion (8): 1995, 2016, 2017, 2018, 2020, 2023, 2024, 2026
  - Runners-up (2): 2006, 2013
- Romanian Supercup
  - Champion (5): 2016, 2018, 2021, 2022, 2025

=== European competitions ===
- BKT EuroCup
  - Quarterfinals (3): 2023–24, 2024–25, 2025–26
- Basketball Champions League
  - Quarterfinals (1): 2021–22
- FIBA Europe Cup
  - Quarterfinals (1): 2019–20
- FIBA EuroCup Challenge
  - Quarterfinals (1): 2006–07
- Central European Basketball League (CEBL)
  - Runners-up (1): 2009-10

=== Regional competitions ===
- ABA League
  - Quarterfinals (1): 2025-26
