= Liga Națională MVP (basketball) =

The Liga Națională Most Valuable Player (MVP) Award is an annual award that is given to the best player of a given regular season of the Romanian Liga Națională.

== Winners ==
Key
†	Indicates multiple award winners in the same season
‡	Denotes the club were Liga Națională champions in the same season

Liga Națională MVP winners
Season	Player	Position	Nationality	Club	Ref(s)
2010–11	Zoran Krstanović	Forward/center	Serbia	"U" Mobitelco BT Cluj-Napoca^{‡}	
2012–13	Alhaji Mohammed	Guard	United States	Asesoft Ploiești^{‡}	
2013–14	Alhaji Mohammed (2×)	Guard	United States	Asesoft Ploiești^{‡}	
2014–15	Marius Runkauskas	Guard	Lithuania	Asesoft Ploiești^{‡}	
2015–16	Sean Barnette	Guard	United States	Oradea	

== Players with most awards ==
Player	Editions	Notes
(United States) Alhaji Mohammed	2	2013, 2014
