= Liga Națională Finals MVP =

Romanian basketball award

The Liga Națională Finals Most Valuable Player (MVP) Award is an annual award that is given to the best player of a given Finals series of the Romanian Liga Națională.

== Winners ==
Season	Player	Position	Nationality	Club	Ref(s)
2012–13	Alhaji Mohammed	Guard	United States	Asesoft Ploiești	
2013–14	Alhaji Mohammed (2)	Guard	United States	Asesoft Ploiești	
2014–15	Marius Runkauskas	Guard	Lithuania	Asesoft Ploiești	
2015–16	Martin Zeno	Guard	United States	Oradea	
2016–17	Ousmane Barro	Center	Senegal	U-BT Cluj-Napoca	
2017–18	Kris Richard	Guard	United States	Oradea	
2018-2019	Giordan Watson	Guard	United States	Oradea	
2019-2020	N/A	N/A	N/A	N/A	N/A
2020-2021	N/A	N/A	N/A	N/A	N/A
2021-2022	Patrick Richard	Guard	United States	U-BT Cluj-Napoca	
2022-2023	Léonardo Meindl	Small Forward	Brazil	U-BT Cluj-Napoca	
2023-2024	Bryce Jones	Guard	United States	U-BT Cluj-Napoca	
2024-2025	Zavier Simpson	Guard	United States	U-BT Cluj-Napoca	
2025-2026	Daron "Fatts" Russell	Guard	United States	U-BT Cluj-Napoca	
