= Dušan Miletić =

Serbian basketball player (born 1998)

No. 11 – Hapoel Jerusalem
- Position: Center
- League: Israeli Premier League; EuroCup

Personal information
- Born: 30 July 1998 (age 28) Kosovska Mitrovica, FR Yugoslavia
- Listed height: 2.15 m (7 ft 1 in)
- Listed weight: 103 kg (227 lb)

Career information
- NBA draft: 2020: undrafted
- Playing career: 2017–present

Career history
- 2017–2019: Sloga
- 2019–2022: Partizan
- 2019, 2020, 2020–2021: →Borac Čačak
- 2022–2023: Girona
- 2023–2024: Śląsk Wrocław
- 2024–2025: Spartak Subotica
- 2025–2026: U-BT Cluj-Napoca
- 2026: Al Riyadi
- 2026–present: Hapoel Jerusalem

Career highlights
- ABA League blocks leader (2026); ABA League Supercup winner (2019); Romanian League champion (2026); Romanian Cup winner (2026); Romanian Supercup winner (2025); Lebanese League champion (2026)

Dušan Miletić (Serbian Cyrillic: Душан Милетић; born 30 July 1998) is a Serbian professional basketball player for Hapoel Jerusalem of the Israeli Premier League and the EuroCup. He also represents the Serbia national team.

== Professional career ==
=== Partizan (2019–2022) ===
In March 2019, Miletić signed a four-year contract with Partizan Belgrade. He was loaned multiple times to Borac Čačak, in 2019, 2020, and for the 2020–21 ABA League season. During the 2020–21 season, he averaged 7.9 points and 4.4 rebounds over 24 ABA League games.

In his final, 2021–22 season with Partizan, Miletić appeared in only five ABA League games, averaging 6.2 points and 4 rebounds on 70.6% shooting from the field.

=== Girona (2022–2023) ===
In August 2022, Miletić signed a contract with the Spanish team Girona, after parting ways with Partizan. In 34 ACB League games, he averaged 16.0 minutes, 7.1 points , 4.2 rebounds, and 1.1 blocks per game on 52.4% shooting from the field.

=== Śląsk Wrocław (2023–2024) ===
On July 27, 2023, Miletić signed a contract with the Polish team Śląsk Wrocław. In 18 EuroCup games played with the team, he averaged 23.7 minutes, 14.9 points, 6.8 rebounds, 1.8 assists, 1.2 steals, and 1.8 blocks per game, shooting 67.1% from the field and 40.6% from three-point range.

=== Spartak Subotica (2024–2025) ===
On July 19, 2024, Miletić signed a contract with the Serbian team Spartak Subotica. In 40 games he averaged 18.9 minutes, 9.9 points, 6.0 rebounds, and 1.1 blocks per game, while shooting 58.3% from the floor.

=== U-BT Cluj-Napoca (2025–2026) ===
On July 25, 2025, Miletić signed with U-BT Cluj-Napoca of the Romanian Liga Națională (LNBM), the ABA League and the EuroCup.

=== Al Riyadi (2026) ===
On 2026, Miletić signed with Al Riyadi of the Lebanese Basketball League. He played 13 games for the team, averaging 27.6 minutes, 15.6 points, 10.5 rebounds, 1.0 assists, and 1.4 blocks per game, while shooting 68.1% from the floor.

=== Hapoel Jerusalem (2026–present) ===
On August 4, 2026, Miletić signed a two-year deal with Hapoel Jerusalem of the Israeli Basketball Premier League.
