= Nandor Kuti =

Romanian basketball player

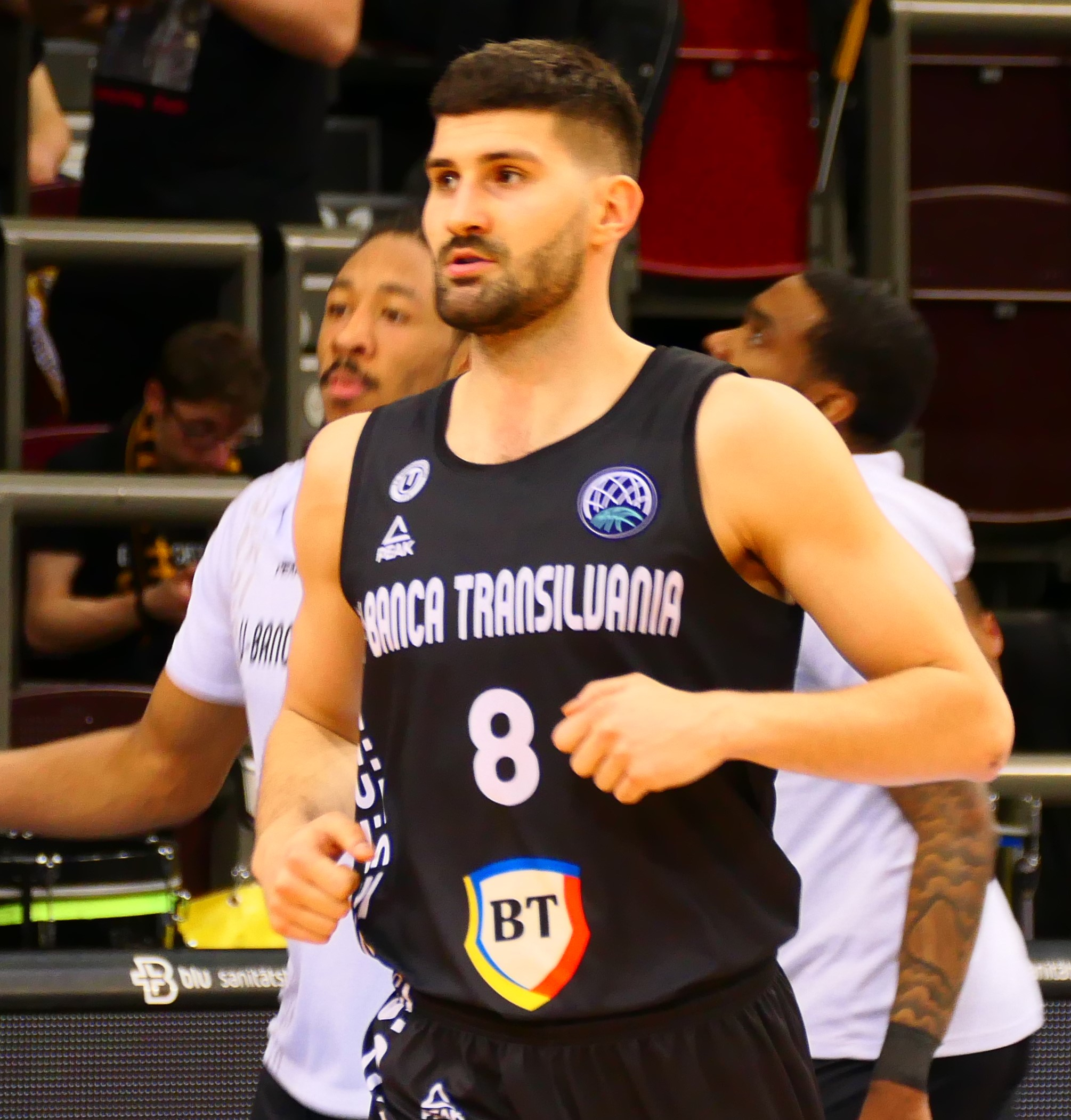
- Kuti with U-BT Cluj-Napoca in April 2022

No. 1 – CS Dinamo București
- Position: Small forward
- League: Liga Națională

Personal information
- Born: 10 January 1997 (age 29) Sfântu Gheorghe, Romania
- Listed height: 1.96 m (6 ft 5 in)

Career information
- Playing career: 2012–present

Career history
- 2012–2023: U-BT Cluj-Napoca
- 2023–2024: CSU Sibiu
- 2024–present: Dinamo București

Career highlights
- 3× Romanian League champion (2017, 2021, 2022); 2× Romanian Supercup winner (2016, 2017)

Nandor Kuti (born 10 January 1997) is a Romanian professional basketball player for Dinamo București of the Liga Națională, and the Romanian national team. He participated at the EuroBasket 2017.
