= Donatas Tarolis =

Lithuanian basketball player (born 1994)

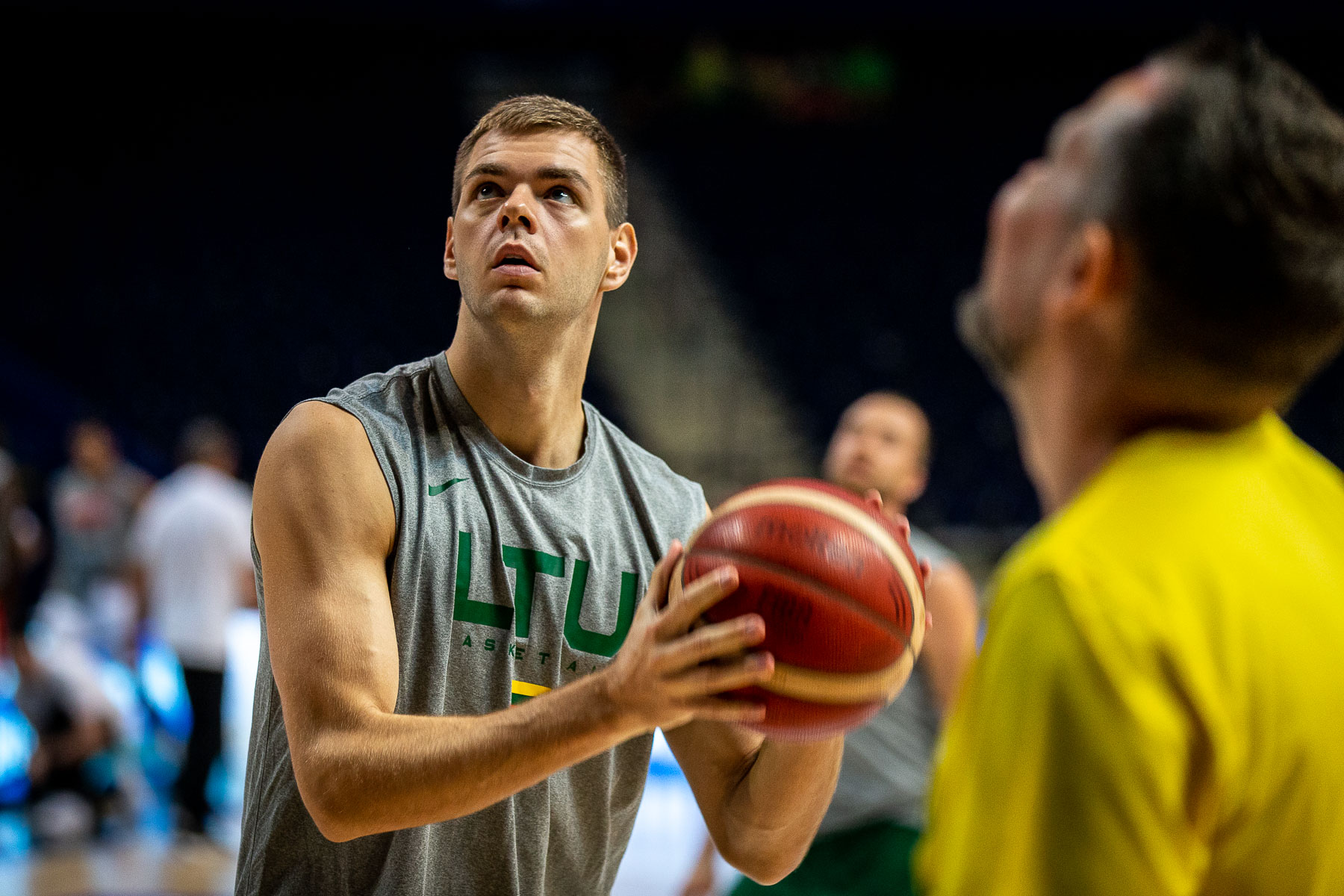
- Tarolis in 2019

No. 1 – Neptūnas Klaipėda
- Position: Power forward / center
- League: LKL; EuroCup

Personal information
- Born: March 30, 1994 (age 32) Gargždai, Lithuania
- Listed height: 203 cm (6 ft 8 in)
- Listed weight: 98 kg (216 lb)

Career information
- NBA draft: 2016: undrafted
- Playing career: 2011–present

Career history
- 2011–2013: BC Gargždai / BC Gargždai-Bremena
- 2013–2015: Žalgiris Kaunas
- 2013–2014: → Žalgiris-2 Kaunas
- 2015–2016: Arkadia Traiskirchen Lions
- 2016–2019: Lietkabelis Panevėžys
- 2019–2021: U-BT Cluj-Napoca
- 2021: Afyon Belediye
- 2021–2022: Budućnost VOLI
- 2022–2025: CSM Oradea
- 2025–present: Neptūnas Klaipėda

Career highlights
- Montenegrin League champion (2022); Montenegrin Cup winner (2022); Romanian League champion (2021); Romanian League Finals MVP (2021); Romanian Cup winner (2020); Lithuanian League champion (2014,2015); LKF Cup winner (2015); NKL MVP (2014)
Medals
Men's basketball
Representing Lithuania
Summer Universiade
Gold medal – first place	2017 Taipei	Team competition
FIBA World Under-19 Championship
Bronze medal – third place	2013 Czech Republic	U-19 Team

Donatas Tarolis (born March 30, 1994) is a Lithuanian professional basketball player for Neptūnas Klaipėda of the Lithuanian Basketball League (LKL) and the EuroCup. Standing at 2.03 m (6 ft 8 in), he plays as a power forward / center. Tarolis is a native of Gargždai.

== Professional career ==
Tarolis started his career in his hometown club BC Gargždai-Bremena, which played in the Lithuanian second-tier National Basketball League (NKL). For the 2013–2014 season, he moved to Žalgiris-2 Kaunas, the reserve team of Žalgiris Kaunas. After averaging 16.0 points, 7.0 rebounds and 1.6 blocks per game, Tarolis received the NKL Most Valuable Player award. In the following year, he joined the senior Žalgiris Kaunas squad. In 18 Lithuanian Basketball League games, he averaged 4.2 points and 2.3 rebounds.

On 9 October 2015, Tarolis signed with Traiskirchen Lions of the Austrian Basketball Superliga.

On 8 September 2016, Tarolis signed a three-year contract with Lietkabelis Panevėžys of Lithuanian Basketball League (LKL).

On 9 August 2019, Tarolis signed with U-BT Cluj-Napoca of the Romanian Liga Națională. He averaged 12.4 points per game during the 2019–20 season with Cluj. On July 2, 2020, he re-signed with the team.

On 3 August 2021, Tarolis signed with Afyon Belediye of the Turkish Basketbol Süper Ligi (BSL). Tarolis averaged 10.4 points, 5.0 rebounds, and 1.5 assists per game.

On 8 December 2021, Tarolis signed with Budućnost VOLI of the Adriatic League and the EuroCup.

On 30 July 2022, Tarolis signed with CSM Oradea of the Liga Națională.

On 5 July 2025, Tarolis signed one–year contract with Neptūnas Klaipėda of the Lithuanian Basketball League (LKL) and the EuroCup.

== National team career ==
Tarolis won gold medal with the Lithuanian team during the 2017 Summer Universiade after defeating the United States' team 74–85 in the final.

== Career statistics ==
Legend
GP	Games played	GS	Games started	MPG	Minutes per game
FG%	Field-goal percentage	3P%	3-point field-goal percentage	FT%	Free-throw percentage
RPG	Rebounds per game	APG	Assists per game	SPG	Steals per game
BPG	Blocks per game	PPG	Points per game	PIR	Performance index rating
**Bold**	Career high

=== EuroCup ===
Year	Team	GP	GS	MPG	FG%	3P%	FT%	RPG	APG	SPG	BPG	PPG	PIR
2016–17	Lietkabelis Panevėžys	14	2	15.7	.552	.381	.500	2.9	1.1	.3	**.4**	6.4	5.9
2017–18	Lietkabelis Panevėžys	9	0	9.5	.524	**.500**	**1.000**	1.9	.7	.2	.2	3.2	3.8
2021–22	Budućnost VOLI	8	4	13.3	.400	.250	.667	**4.0**	.5	.3	**.4**	2.4	3.4
2025–26	Neptūnas Klaipėda	**15**	**14**	**22.9**	**.555**	.343	.810	3.9	**1.8**	**.5**	.3	**12.5**	**13.5**
Career		46	20	16.4	.538	.355	.754	3.2	1.1	.3	.3	7.1	7.5
