= Iverson Molinar =

Panamanian basketball player

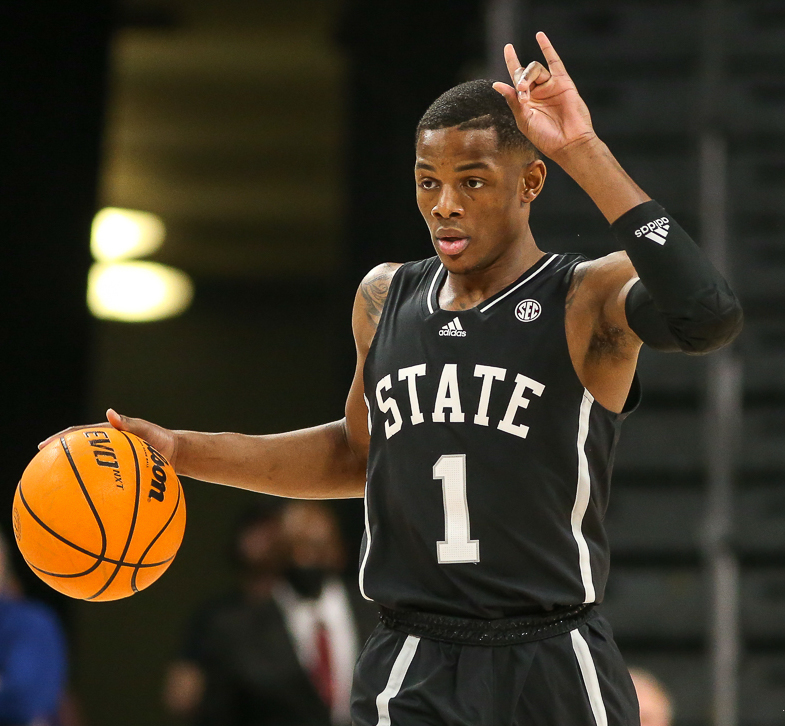
- Molinar with Mississippi State in 2022

No. 10 – Budućnost
- Position: Shooting guard / point guard
- League: Prva A Liga; ABA League; EuroCup

Personal information
- Born: December 3, 1999 (age 26) Panama City, Panama
- Listed height: 1.91 m (6 ft 3 in)
- Listed weight: 86 kg (190 lb)

Career information
- High school: Oaks Christian School (Westlake Village, California); Covenant Christian Ministries Academy (Marietta, Georgia); Veritas Prep (Calabasas, California)
- College: Mississippi State (2019–2022)
- NBA draft: 2022: undrafted
- Playing career: 2022–present

Career history
- 2022–2023: Wisconsin Herd
- 2023–2024: Mexico City Capitanes
- 2024: Ostioneros de Guaymas
- 2024–2025: Hapoel Be'er Sheva
- 2025–2026: U-BT Cluj-Napoca
- 2026–present: Budućnost

Career highlights
- First-team All-SEC (2022); Romanian Cup winner (2026); Romanian League champion (2025–2026); Romanian Supercup winner (2025–2026)
- Stats at NBA.com
- Stats at Basketball Reference

Iverson Latrell Molinar Jones (born December 3, 1999) is a Panamanian professional basketball player for Budućnost Podgorica of the ABA League and the Prva A Liga. He played college basketball for the Mississippi State Bulldogs.

== Early life ==
Molinar grew up in Panama City, Panama. He moved to the United States at age 15 to play for Oaks Christian School in Westlake Village, California. As a junior at Covenant Christian Ministries Academy in Marietta, Georgia, Molinar averaged 21.5 points, six rebounds and five assists per game. He played for Veritas National Prep School as a senior. Molinar also competed for Team Why Not, an Amateur Athletic Union program founded by NBA player Russell Westbrook. He committed to playing college basketball for Mississippi State over offers from Arizona and Arizona State, among others.

== College career ==
On November 21, 2019, Molinar scored a freshman season-high 21 points in an 80–66 win over Tulane. As a freshman, he averaged 5.9 points per game. He missed the first three games of his sophomore season after testing positive for COVID-19. On January 9, 2021, Molinar recorded 24 points, eight rebounds and four steals in an 84–81 victory over Vanderbilt. He was subsequently named Southeastern Conference (SEC) Player of the Week. As a sophomore, Molinar averaged 16.7 points, 3.7 rebounds, and 2.3 assists per game. On January 12, 2022, Molinar scored 28 points in an 88–72 win against Georgia. On January 25, 2022, he scored a career-high 30 points in an 82–74 overtime loss against Kentucky. Molinar was named to the First Team All-SEC as a junior. As a junior, he averaged 17.5 points, 3.6 assists, 3.1 rebounds and 1.2 steals per game. On March 25, 2022, Molinar declared for the 2022 NBA draft while maintaining his college eligibility. He later signed with an agent, forgoing his remaining eligibility.

== Professional career ==
=== Wisconsin Herd (2022–2023) ===
After going undrafted in the 2022 NBA draft, Molinar joined the Milwaukee Bucks for the 2022 NBA Summer League and on September 19, 2022, he signed with them. However, he was waived the next day and subsequently joined the Wisconsin Herd, making the opening day roster.

After rejoining Milwaukee for the 2023 NBA Summer League, Molinar re-signed with the Bucks on September 2, 2023. However, he was waived on the same day. On October 30, Molinar rejoined the Wisconsin Herd.

=== Mexico City Capitanes (2023–2024) ===
On December 8, 2023, Molinar was traded to the Mexico City Capitanes.

=== Ostioneros de Guaymas (2024) ===
On April 26, 2024, Molinar signed with the Ostioneros de Guaymas of the Circuito de Baloncesto de la Costa del Pacífico.

=== Hapoel Be'er Sheva (2024–2025) ===
On July 24, 2024, Molinar signed with Hapoel Be'er Sheva of the Ligat HaAl.

=== Budućnost (2026–present) ===
On June 19, 2026, he signed with Budućnost Podgorica of the ABA League and the Prva A Liga.

== National team career ==
Molinar played for Panama's junior national teams from the age of 10. He made his debut with the senior national team at the 2017 FIBA AmeriCup, averaging three points per game.

== Career statistics ==
Legend
GP	Games played	GS	Games started	MPG	Minutes per game
FG%	Field goal percentage	3P%	3-point field goal percentage	FT%	Free throw percentage
RPG	Rebounds per game	APG	Assists per game	SPG	Steals per game
BPG	Blocks per game	PPG	Points per game	**Bold**	Career high

=== College ===
Year	Team	GP	GS	MPG	FG%	3P%	FT%	RPG	APG	SPG	BPG	PPG
2019–20	Mississippi State	31	8	15.4	**.489**	.371	.768	1.0	1.3	.3	.1	5.9
2020–21	Mississippi State	30	29	32.6	.478	**.436**	.804	**3.7**	2.3	.9	.1	16.7
2021–22	Mississippi State	**34**	**34**	**34.1**	.454	.252	**.868**	3.1	**3.6**	**1.2**	**.4**	**17.5**
Career		95	71	27.5	.468	.346	.831	2.6	2.4	.8	.2	13.5

== Personal life ==
Molinar is the son of Leyza Jones and Manuel Molinar. He is named after Hall of Fame basketball player Allen Iverson. He speaks English, Spanish and Italian.
