= 2024–25 Liga Națională (men's basketball) =

Romanian men's basketball tournament

- Season: 2024–25
- Teams: 16

The 2024–25 Liga Națională season is the 75th season of the Liga Națională, the highest professional basketball league in Romania.

U-BT Cluj-Napoca are the defending champions.

== Teams ==
Team	City
BC CSU Sibiu	Sibiu
CS Dinamo București	Bucharest
CS Rapid București	Bucharest
CS Vâlcea 1924 Râmnicu Vâlcea	Râmnicu Vâlcea
CSA Steaua Bucuresti	Bucharest
CSM Petrolul Ploiești	Ploiești
CSM Corona Brașov	Brașov
CSM Constanța	Constanța
CSM CSU Oradea	Oradea
CSM Galați	Galați
CSM Târgu Mureș	Târgu Mureș
CSO Voluntari	Voluntari
FC Argeș Pitești	Pitești
SCM winsed.swiss Timisoara	Timișoara
SCMU Craiova	Craiova
U-BT Cluj-Napoca	Cluj-Napoca
