= Eurocup 2014–15 Regular Season Group N =

Standings and Results for Group N of the Last 32 phase of the 2014–15 Eurocup basketball tournament.

== Standings ==
Pos	Team	Pld	W	L	PF	PA	PD	LOK	VBC	ASE	SLU
1	(Russia) Lokomotiv Kuban	6	6	0	492	416	+76		74–62	92–79	85–70
2	(Spain) Valencia	6	3	3	490	459	+31	89–90		87–92	77–46
3	(Romania) Asesoft Ploiești	6	2	4	469	529	−60	59–85	84–100		88–81
4	(France) Nancy	6	1	5	411	458	−47	57–66	73–75	84–67	

Source: Euroleague Basketball;
