= Mihai Silvășan =

Romanian basketball player and coach (born 1985)

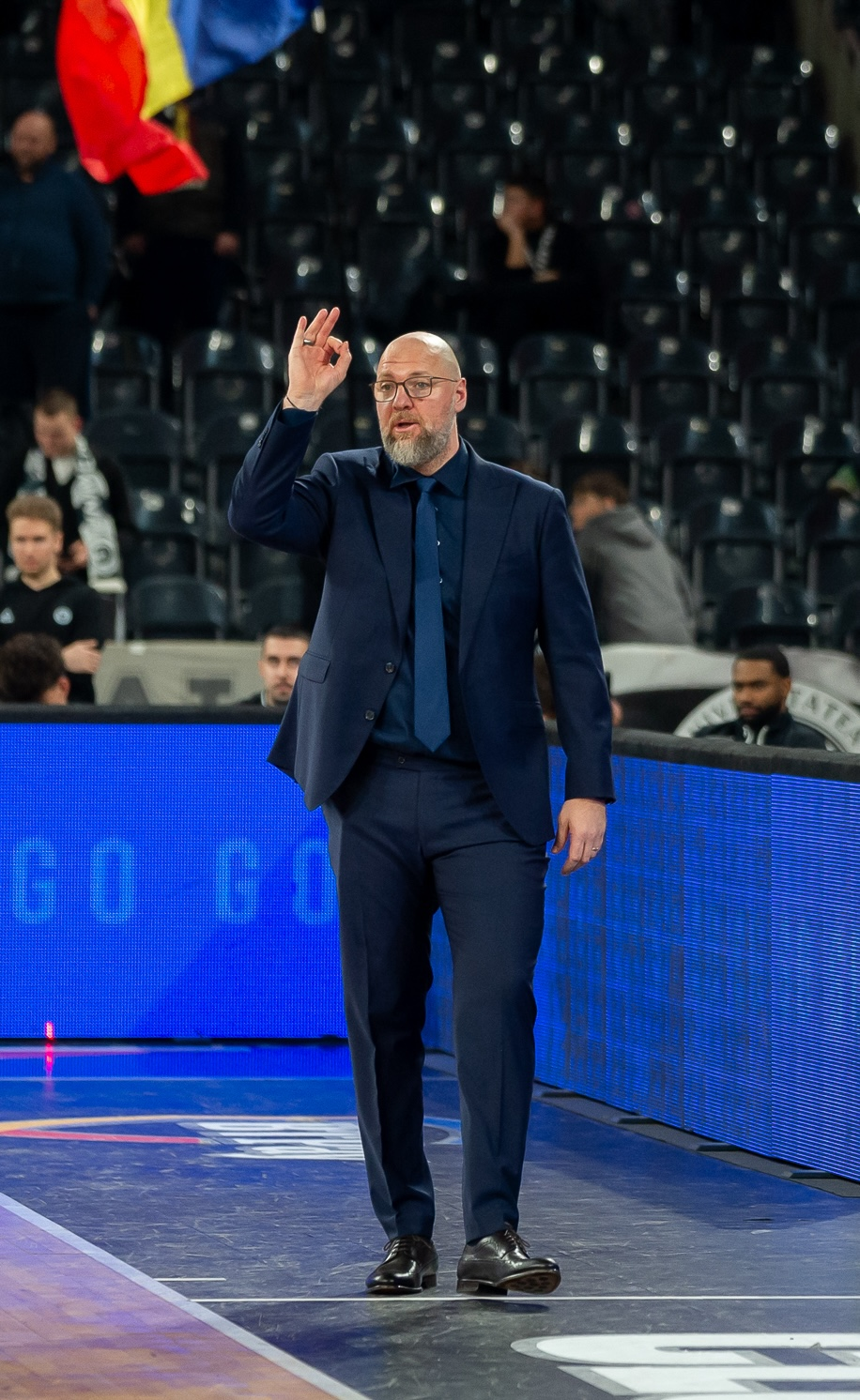
- Silvășan with U-BT Cluj-Napoca in January 2025

U-BT Cluj-Napoca
- Position: Head coach
- League: Liga Națională

Personal information
- Born: 20 January 1985 (age 41) Cluj Napoca , Romania

Career history

Playing
- 2002–2015: U-Mobitelco Cluj

Coaching
- 2016–present: U-BT Cluj-Napoca
- 2024–2026: Romania

Career highlights
- As a player: Romanian Champion: 2011; As a head coach: Romanian Champion: 2017, 2021, 2022, 2023, 2024, 2025, 2026

Mihai Vlad Silvășan (born 20 January 1985) is a Romanian basketball coach and former professional player, currently serving as the head coach for U-BT Cluj-Napoca of the Liga Națională, the top tier in Romania. He has previously also worked as head coach of the Romanian national team until 2026, and represented Romania as a player at the 2015 Eurobasket qualification, where he was the team's best 3-point shooter.
