= Zoran Krstanović =

Serbian basketball player

Zoran Krstanovic
Joker
- Position: Power forward / center

Personal information
- Born: July 18, 1982 (age 44) Sombor, SR Serbia, SFR Yugoslavia
- Listed height: 6 ft 9 in (2.06 m)
- Listed weight: 253 lb (115 kg)

Career information
- NBA draft: 2004: undrafted
- Playing career: 1999–present

Career history
- 1999–2001: Sombor-Mlin
- 2001–2002: Novi Sad
- 2002–2005: Polet-Keramika Novi Bečej
- 2005–2006: U-Mobitelco Cluj-Napoca
- 2006–2007: Soproni KC
- 2007–2008: U-Mobitelco Cluj-Napoca
- 2008–2009: Hanzevast Capitals
- 2009–2012: U-Mobiteco Cluj-Napoca
- 2012–2013: Kryvbasbasket
- 2013: Gaz Metan Mediaş
- 2013–2014: Oberwart Gunners
- 2014–2015: CSU Craiova
- 2015: Falco KC Szombathely
- 2015–2016: Marso Nyiregyhazi
- 2016–2017: Union Neuchatêl
- 2018–2019: SAM Massagno
- 2019–2020: Spartak Subotica
- 2020–2021: Tamiš
- 2021–present: Joker

Career highlights
- Romanian League champion (2011); Romanian League MVP (2011)

Zoran Krstanovic (born July 18, 1982) is a Serbian professional basketball player for Joker Sombor. Standing at 6 ft 9 in (2.06 m), he usually plays as power forward or center. He spent most of his career in Romania with U-Mobitelco Cluj-Napoca, as he played 5 seasons for the team from Cluj-Napoca.

== Professional career ==
In 2013–14 he played for Oberwart Gunners in the Austrian ÖBL. With 20.6 points per game he was the leading scorer in Austria, he was also the fourth-best rebounder with 7.7 a game.

For the 2014–15 season, Krstanovic signed in Romania with SCM CSU Craiova. In January 2015, he was released by Craiova. On January 7, 2015, Krstanovic signed in Hungary with Falco KC Szombathely.

== Personal ==
Krstanović is married and has two kids.
