= Patrick Richard =

American-Romanian basketball player

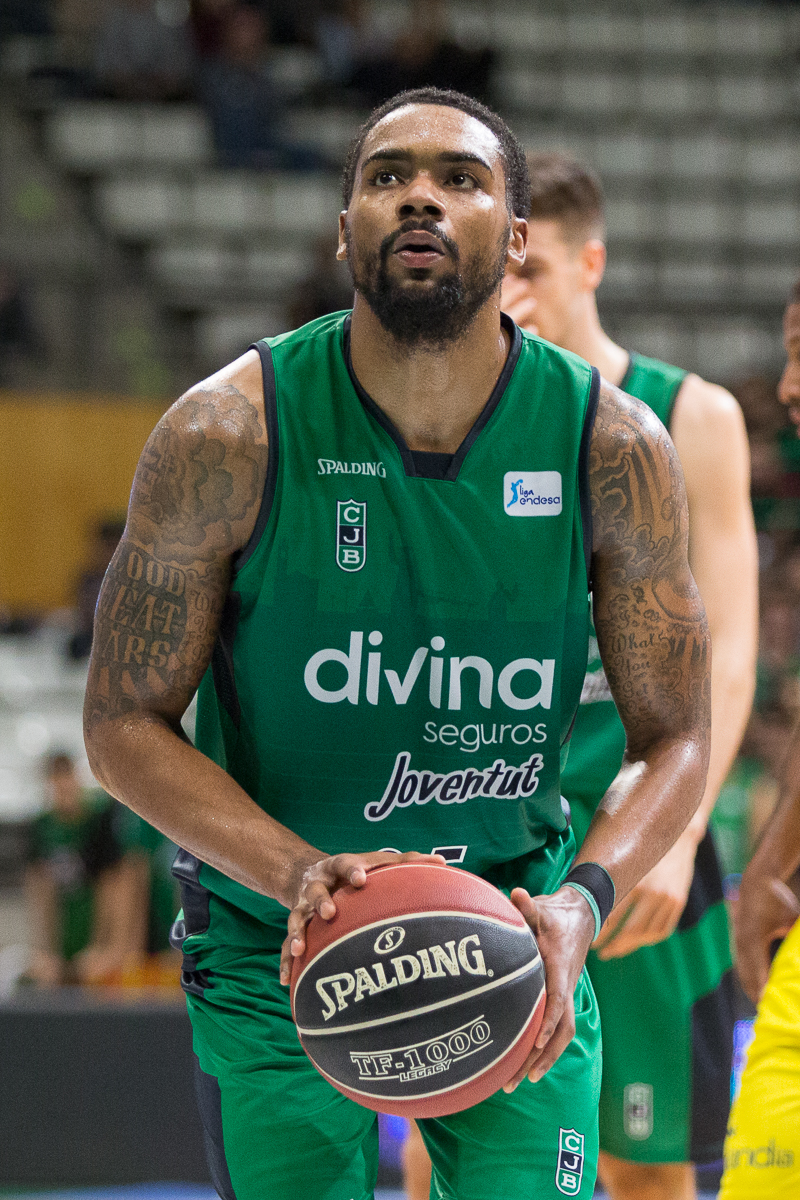
- Richard with Joventut Badalona in 2017

No. 35 – U-BT Cluj-Napoca
- Position: Shooting guard / Point guard
- League: Liga Națională; Romanian Cup; ABA League; EuroCup

Personal information
- Born: January 25, 1990 (age 36) Lafayette, Louisiana, U.S.
- Listed height: 6 ft 4 in (1.93 m)
- Listed weight: 208 lb (94 kg)

Career information
- High school: Carencro (Lafayette, Louisiana)
- College: McNeese (2008–2012)
- NBA draft: 2012: undrafted
- Playing career: 2012–present

Career history
- 2013: Sandringham Sabres
- 2013–2014: Matrixx Magixx
- 2014–2015: Mitteldeutscher
- 2015–2016: Champagne Châlons-Reims
- 2016–2017: Maccabi Rishon LeZion
- 2017–2018: Joventut Badalona
- 2018–2019: New Zealand Breakers
- 2019: Reggio Emilia
- 2019–present: U-BT Cluj-Napoca

Career highlights
- All-EuroCup Second Team (2024); 6× Romanian League champion (2021–2026); Romanian League All-Star (2022); 4× Romanian Supercup champion (2021, 2022, 2025,2026); 4× Romanian Cup winner (2020, 2023, 2024,2026); BBL All-Star (2015); All-DBL Team (2014); DBL All-Star (2014); Southland Player of the Year (2012); 2× First-team All-Southland (2011, 2012); Third-team All-Southland (2010)

Patrick Neal Richard II (born January 25, 1990) is an American-born naturalised Romanian professional basketball player for U-BT Cluj-Napoca of the Romanian Liga Națională. He played collegiately with the McNeese State Cowboys for four seasons before playing professionally in Australia, the Netherlands, Germany, France, Israel, Spain and New Zealand.

== College career ==
Richard played four years for the McNeese State Cowboys. In his senior year, Richard was named the Southland Conference Player of the Year after averaging 17.9 points and 6.4 rebounds per contest. He led the Cowboys to a second consecutive conference tournament final appearance and a national postseason tournament for the second straight year. He completed his career with 1,625 points – 12th best on the McNeese all-time career scoring list. He became just the seventh Cowboy basketball player in school history to earn an all-American honor after he was named an Associated Press All-American honorable mention. He was also named the Louisiana Player of the Year.

== Professional career ==
After going undrafted in the 2012 NBA draft, Richard joined the Detroit Pistons for the 2012 NBA Summer League. On November 2, 2012, he was selected by the Iowa Energy in the seventh round of the 2012 NBA D-League draft. He was waived by Iowa on November 21 prior to playing in a game for them.

In March 2013, Richard signed with the Sandringham Sabres in Australia for the 2013 SEABL season. In 24 games, he averaged 18.5 points, 6.4 rebounds and 2.1 assists per game.

In August 2013, Richard signed with Matrixx Magixx of the Dutch Basketball League. In April 2014, he was named in the All-DBL Team. In 38 games, he averaged 15.3 points, 4.9 rebounds, 2.7 assists and 1.4 steals per game.

In June 2014, Richard signed with Mitteldeutscher BC of the Basketball Bundesliga. In 32 games, he averaged 13.2 points, 3.4 rebounds and 2.8 assists per game.

In June 2015, Richard signed with Champagne Châlons-Reims Basket of the LNB Pro A. In 34 games, he averaged 9.6 points, 2.9 rebounds and 2.1 assists per game.

In July 2016, Richard signed with Maccabi Rishon LeZion of the Israeli Basketball Premier League. In 31 league games, he averaged 11.5 points, 4.4 rebounds, 3.0 assists and 1.1 steals per game. He also averaged 12.8 points, 5.8 rebounds, 4.7 assists and 1.3 steals in 16 BCL games.

On July 25, 2017, Richard signed with Joventut Badalona of the Liga ACB. In 32 league games, he averaged 11.3 points, 3.2 rebounds, 1.7 assists and 1.3 steals per game. He also averaged 10.5 points, 4.5 rebounds, 3.0 assists and 1.3 steals in four BCL games.

On June 18, 2018, Richard signed with the New Zealand Breakers for the 2018–19 NBL season. In 26 games, he averaged 11.0 points, 3.5 rebounds and 2.3 assists per game.

On February 21, 2019, Richard signed with Italian team Reggio Emilia.

On July 22, 2019, he has signed with Cluj in the Romanian League. On April 8, 2024, Richard was named to the All-EuroCup Second Team for the 2023–24 season.

== Personal ==
In February 2021, Richard received Romanian citizenship, making him eligible to play for the Romania national basketball team. Responding to his new nationality, he stated: "It is a blessing, I am really happy that I was taken into account to receive Romanian citizenship. I feel really good here, as everyone knows. I can't wait to play for the national team."

== Awards and accomplishments ==
=== Club ===
U-BT Cluj-Napoca

- Liga Națională: (2021)(2022)(2023)(2024)
- Romanian Cup: (2020)(2022)(2023)
- Romanian Basketball Supercup:(2021)(2022)(2025)

=== Individual ===
- 2023–24 EuroCup Basketball Second Team (2024)
- BBL All-Star: (2015)
- All-DBL Team: (2014)
- DBL All-Star: (2014)
- Southland Player of the Year: (2012)
- 2× First-team All-Southland: (2011, 2012)
- Third-team All-Southland: (2010)
