= CS Vâlcea 1924 Râmnicu Vâlcea =

- Nickname: Lupii negri (Black Wolves)
- Leagues: Liga Națională
- Founded: 2022; 4 years ago
- History: CS Vâlcea 1924 Râmnicu Vâlcea (2022–present)
- Arena: Traian
- Capacity: 2,239
- Location: Râmnicu Vâlcea, Romania
- Team colors: Blue, White, Black
- Team manager: Cătălin Nazîru
- Head coach: Antonis Constantinides
- Ownership: Vâlcea County
- Website: Official website

CS Vâlcea 1924 Râmnicu Vâlcea is a professional basketball team from Râmnicu Vâlcea, Romania. The team plays in the Liga Națională.

== History ==
The Vâlcea Sports Club established itself and its basketball section in 2022. In the first year after its establishment, the CS Vâlcea 1924 team promoted from 2nd place in the National Men's Basketball League.

In the 2009-10 season, the BC Râmnicu Vâlcea men's basketball team disbanded, being the last team to represent the city of Râmnicu Vâlcea in the first national men's basketball league in Romania.

== Season by season ==
Season	Tier	Division	Pos.	W–L	Romanian Cup	European competitions
2022–23	2	Liga I	2nd (P)	22–7		
2023–24	1	Liga Națională	13th	16–14	Group stage	
2024–25	1	Liga Națională	3rd	22–8	Round of 32	
2025–26	1	Liga Națională	9th	15-13	Quarter-finals	FIBA Europe Cup

== Current roster ==
Note: Flags indicate national team eligibility at FIBA-sanctioned events. Players may hold other non-FIBA nationalities not displayed.

CS Vâlcea 1924 Râmnicu Vâlcea roster
Players
Coaches

Pos.	No.	Nat.	Name	Ht.	Age
PG	1	(Romania)	Tohătan, Lucas	1.87 m (6 ft 2 in)	27 – 15 March 1999
F	2	(United States)	Pinckney, DeAndre	2.03 m (6 ft 8 in)	26 – 29 February 2000
PF	3	(United States)	Gabriel, Kenny	2.06 m (6 ft 9 in)	36 – 3 July 1989
SG	7	(Romania)	Rotaru, Anton	1.90 m (6 ft 3 in)	24 – 10 May 2002
PF	10	(Romania)	Nicoară, Titus	2.01 m (6 ft 7 in)	38 – 25 March 1988
SG	11	(United States)	Forbes, Bryn	1.88 m (6 ft 2 in)	32 – 23 July 1993
PF	14	(Romania)	Hurdubelea, Raul	2.02 m (6 ft 8 in)	18 – 25 July 2007
SF	15	(United States)	Ivory, Donovan	1.98 m (6 ft 6 in)	24 – 15 July 2001
SF	18	(Romania)	Casale, Amadeo	1.96 m (6 ft 5 in)	28 – 14 December 1997
PG	20	(Belgium)	Lecomte, Manu	1.80 m (5 ft 11 in)	30 – 16 August 1995
PF	22	(United States)	McCaffery, Patrick	2.06 m (6 ft 9 in)	26 – 20 March 2000
	24	(Romania)	Boghean, Sebastian	1.92 m (6 ft 4 in)	18 – 23 February 2008
SG	32	(United States)	Kiss, Peter	1.96 m (6 ft 5 in)	29 – 9 May 1997
C	44	(Romania)	Uță, Rareș	2.12 m (6 ft 11 in)	28 – 24 December 1997
	66	(Romania)	Pistol, Rareș	1.83 m (6 ft 0 in)	19 – 17 December 2006

Head coach

- (Cyprus) Antonis Constantinides
- (Romania) Enache, Ciprian

Legend

- (C) Team captain
- Injured

- Roster
Updated: 9 December 2025
