= BC Gladiator Cluj-Napoca =

BC Gladiator
- Nickname: Gladiatorii (The Gladiators)
- Founded: 2007
- Dissolved: 2013
- Arena: Horia Demian
- Capacity: 2,525
- Location: Cluj-Napoca, Romania
- Team colors: Orange, Black
| Home | Away |

BC Gladiator Cluj-Napoca was a Romanian professional basketball club, based in Cluj-Napoca, Romania. The team promoted for the first time in Division A in 2009, only two years after being founded. After Gladiator's promotion, Cluj-Napoca became the first city of Romania, except for the capital Bucharest, with more than one team in the first division.
