= 2012–13 Liga Națională (men's basketball) =

Romanian men's basketball tournament

Liga Națională
- Duration: 6 October 2012 – 2 April 2013 (Regular season)
- Teams: 16
- TV partner(s): Digi Sport; TVR

Regular season
- Season MVP: (United States) Alhaji Mohammed

Finals
- Champions: CSU Asesoft Ploieşti (9th title)
- Runners-up: Mureş
- Semifinalists: CSM Oradea; Gaz Metan Mediaş

The 2012–13 Liga Națională season was the 63rd season of the Liga Națională, the highest professional basketball league in Romania.

The first half of the season consisted of 16 teams and 240-game regular season (30 games for each of the 16 teams). The season began on 6 October 2012 and ended on 2 April 2013, just before the Playoffs.

== Teams ==
2012–13 Liga Națională club locations

Team	City	Arena	Capacity
BC Mureș	Târgu Mureș	Sala Sporturilor Târgu Mureș	2,000
Dinamo București	București	Arena de Baschet	300
Asesoft Ploieşti	Ploieşti	Olimpia Sports Hall	3,500
Gaz Metan Mediaş	Mediaş	Sala Sporturilor Mediaş	461
U-Mobitelco BT Cluj	Cluj Napoca	Sala Sporturilor Horia Demian	2,525
Farul Constanţa	Constanţa	Sala Sporturilor Constanţa	1,500
BC Argeş Piteşti	Piteşti	Sala Sporturilor Trivale	2,000
BC Timișoara	Timișoara	Constantin Jude Hall	2,200
SCM Universitatea Craiova	Craiova	Sala Sporturilor Craiova	4,215
CSM Oradea	Oradea	Arena Antonio Alexe	2,000
CSU Atlassib Sibiu	Sibiu	Sala Transilvania	3,000
BC Miercurea Ciuc	Miercurea Ciuc	Sala Sporturilor Miercurea Ciuc	600
CSS Giurgiu	Giurgiu	Sala Sporturilor Giugiu	300
Timba Timișoara	Timișoara	Constantin Jude Hall	2,200
Energia Rovinari	Târgu Jiu	Sala Sporturilor Târgu Jiu	1,500

== Regular season ==
Number	Team	Points	GP	Wins/Losses	Points for/against
1	BC Mures	53	30	23–7	2481–2203
2	CSM Oradea	53	30	23–7	2248–2111
3	CSU Ploiesti	53	30	23–7	2677–2341
4	SCM U Craiova	51	30	21–9	2465–2319
5	CS Gaz Metan Medias	50	30	20–10	2446–2158
6	BC Timișoara	50	30	20–10	2516–2335
7	U-Mobitelco BT Cluj	50	30	20–10	2530–2284
8	CSM Bucuresti	48	30	18–12	2530–2284
9	Energia Rovinari	45	30	15–15	2392–2372
10	CSU Sibiu	44	30	14–16	2329–2292
11	BCM U Pitesti	43	30	13–17	2370–2310
12	CSS Giurgiu	41	30	11–19	2309–2358
13	BC Timba Timișoara	38	30	8–22	2240–2479
14	BC Farul Constanta	37	30	7–23	2048–2443
15	BC Miercurea Ciuc	33	30	3–27	2141–2571
16	CS Dinamo Bucuresti	31	30	1–29	1926–2845

== Playoffs ==
In the 2012–13 season, the first eight teams qualify for the play-off and the last eight teams qualify for the play-out. In the play-offs, the teams play by the "best of five" system in the first two rounds, and by the "best of seven" in the finals. For the third place, CSM Oradea won 2–1 against Gaz Metan Mediaş in the "best of three" system.

Quarter finals (best of 5)
1	BC Mures	3
8	CSM Bucuresti	1
4	SCM U Craiova	0
5	Gaz Metan Mediaş	3
3	Asesoft Ploieşti	3
6	BC Timișoara	0
2	CSM Oradea	3
7	U-Mobitelco BT Cluj	0

Semi finals (best of 5)
1	BC Mures	3
5	Gaz Metan Mediaş	0
2	CSM Oradea	1
3	Asesoft Ploieşti	3

Finals (best of 7)
1	BC Mures	2
3	Asesoft Ploieşti	4
