= 2025–26 Liga Națională (men's basketball) =

Romanian men's basketball tournament

- Season: 2025–26
- Teams: 16

The 2025–26 Liga Națională season is the 76th season of the Liga Națională, the highest professional basketball league in Romania.

U-BT Cluj-Napoca are the defending champions.

== Teams ==
Team	City
Argeș Pitești	Pitești
CSM Corona Brașov	Brașov
CSM Oradea	Oradea
CSM Galați	Galați
CSM Târgu Jiu	Târgu Jiu
CSM Târgu Mureș	Târgu Mureș
CSO Voluntari	Voluntari
CSU Sibiu	Sibiu
CS Vâlcea 1924 Râmnicu Vâlcea	Râmnicu Vâlcea
Dinamo București	Bucharest
Petrolul Ploiești	Ploiești
Rapid București	Bucharest
SCM Timisoara	Timișoara
SCMU Craiova	Craiova
Steaua București	Bucharest
U-BT Cluj-Napoca	Cluj-Napoca
