= Levente Szijarto =

Romanian basketball player

No. 6 – CSA Steaua București
- Position: Guard
- League: Liga Națională

Personal information
- Born: June 15, 1982 (age 44) Oradea, Romania
- Listed height: 6 ft 4 in (1.93 m)
- Listed weight: 198 lb (90 kg)

Career information
- College: Timișoara (1998–1999)
- Playing career: 1999–present

Career history
- 1999–2003: West Petrom Arad
- 2003–2008: Asesoft Ploiești
- 2008–2009: U-Mobitelco Cluj
- 2009–2015: Asesoft Ploiești
- 2015–present: Steaua București

Career highlights
- FIBA Europe Cup champion (2005)

Levente Szijarto (born June 15, 1982) is a Romanian professional basketball player for Steaua București of the Romanian League.
