= Horia Demian Sports Hall =

Multi-use arena in Cluj-Napoca, Romania

Coordinates: 46.765701°N 23.564304°E

- Interactive map of Horia Demian Sports Hall
- Full name: Sala Sporturilor Horia Demian
- Location: Cluj-Napoca, Romania
- Owner: DJST Cluj
- Operator: CS Universitatea Cluj-Napoca
- Capacity: 2,525

Construction
- Opened: 1970
- Renovated: 2010

Tenant
- CS Universitatea Cluj-Napoca (1970–present)

Horia Demian Sports Hall (Romanian: 'Sala Sporturilor Horia Demian'), part of the city's Splaiul Independenţei sports complex, is a multi-use arena in Cluj-Napoca, Romania. It is used as the home ground of both the men's and women's handball and basketball teams of CS Universitatea Cluj-Napoca. It holds 2,525 seats.

The arena is named in honour of Horia Demian, a local basketball player. It hosted the 2006 MTV Romania Music Awards. It will be used as one of the two venues for the 2020 FIBA Under-17 Women's Basketball World Cup.

== See also ==
- BT Arena
