= CS Universitatea Cluj-Napoca =

Romanian multi-sport club

- Full name: Clubul Sportiv Universitatea Cluj-Napoca
- Nicknames: Șepcile roșii (The Red Caps); Studenții (The Students); Alb-Negrii (The White and Blacks)
- Founded: 1919; 107 years ago
- Based in: Cluj-Napoca, Romania
- Colours: White, Black
- Chairman: Sorin Grozav
- Website: Official website

CS Universitatea Cluj-Napoca is a Romanian sports society from Cluj-Napoca, Romania. Founded in September 1919 by the "Sports Society of University Students" (Romanian: Societatea Sportivă a Studenţilor Universitari). Its first chairman was Prof. Iuliu Haţieganu, famous doctor and politician.

== Notable personalities ==
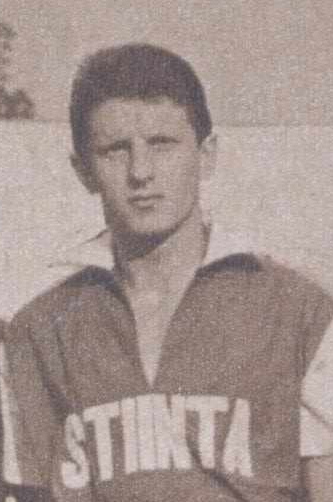
Remus Câmpeanu

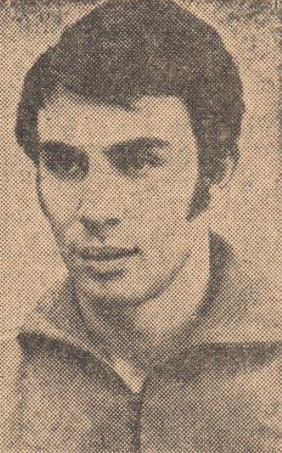
Constantin Tudosie

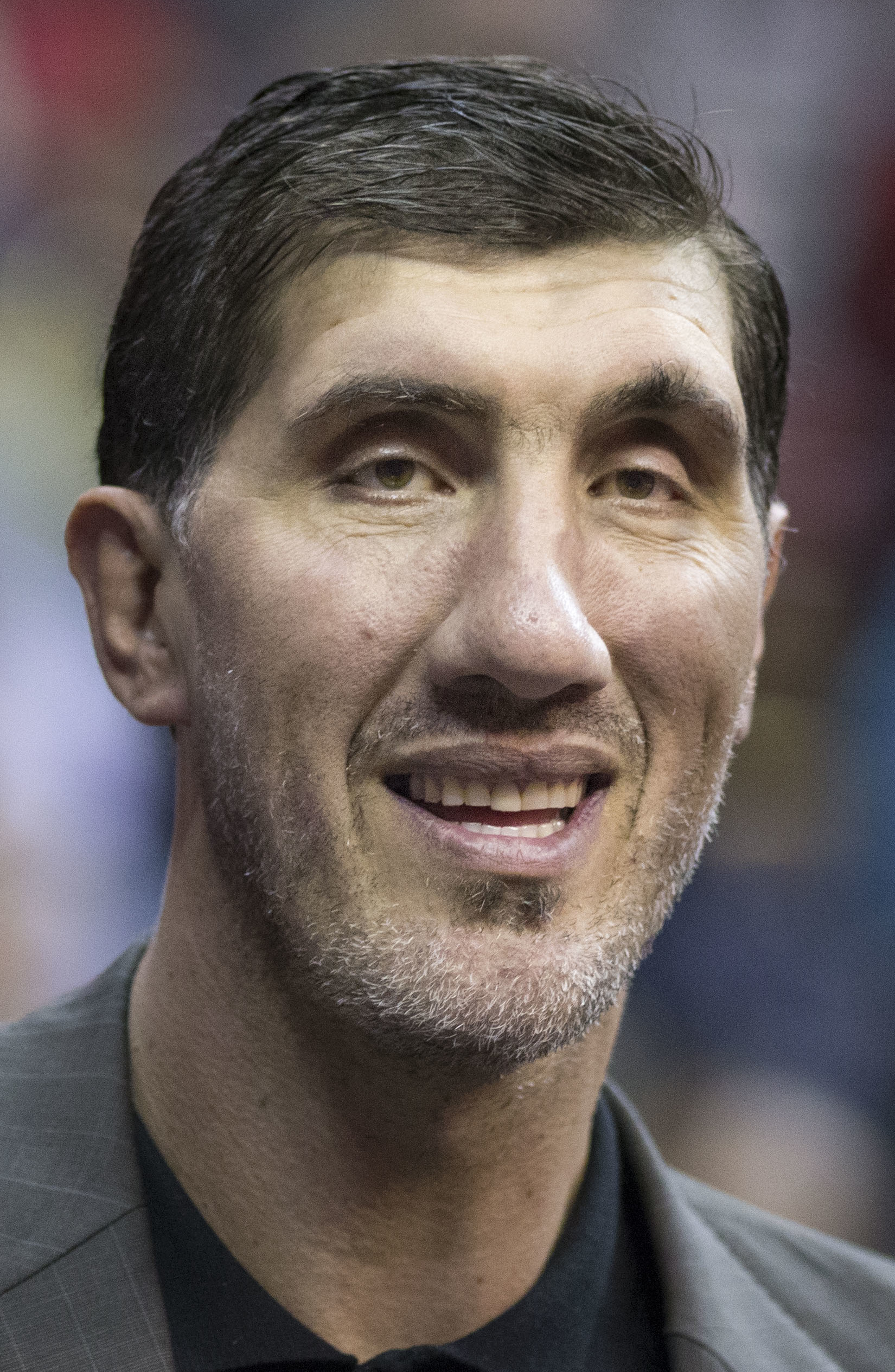
Gheorghe Mureșan

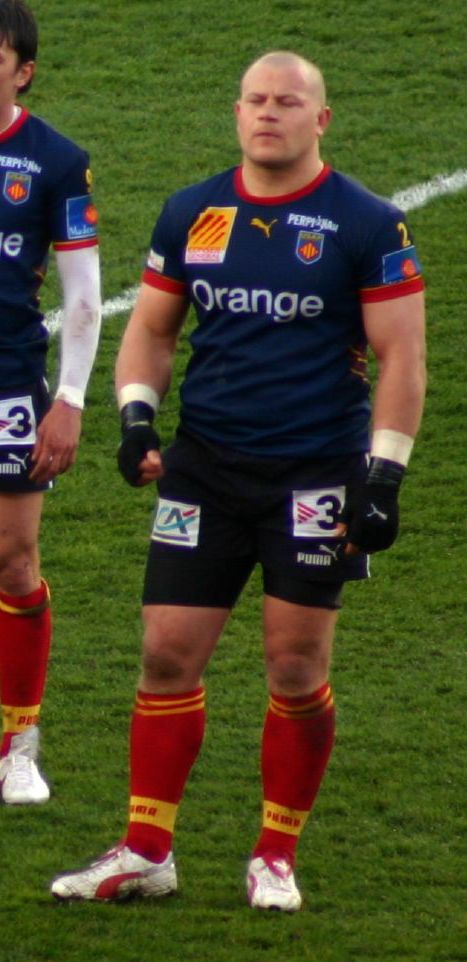
Marius Tincu

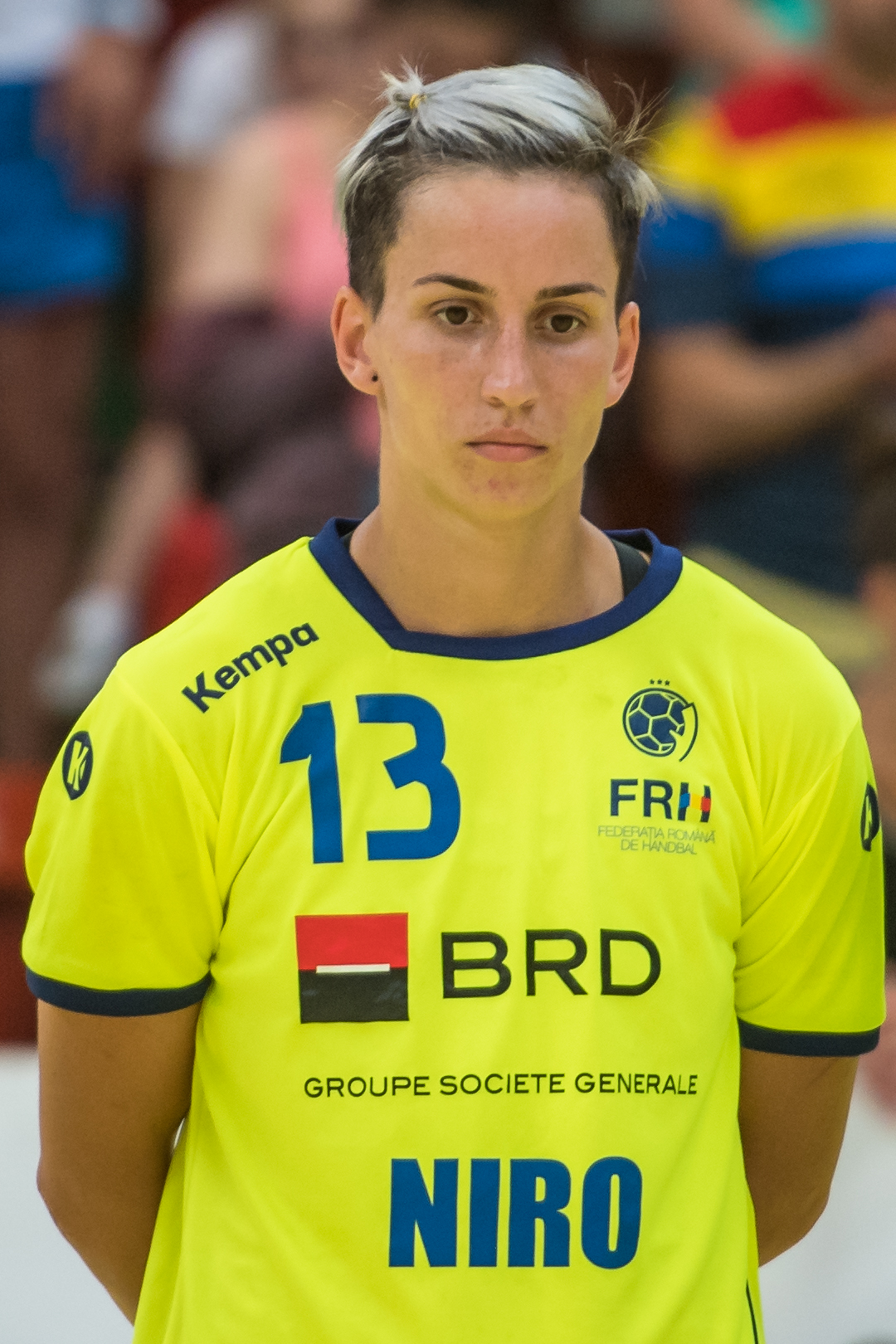
Cristina Laslo

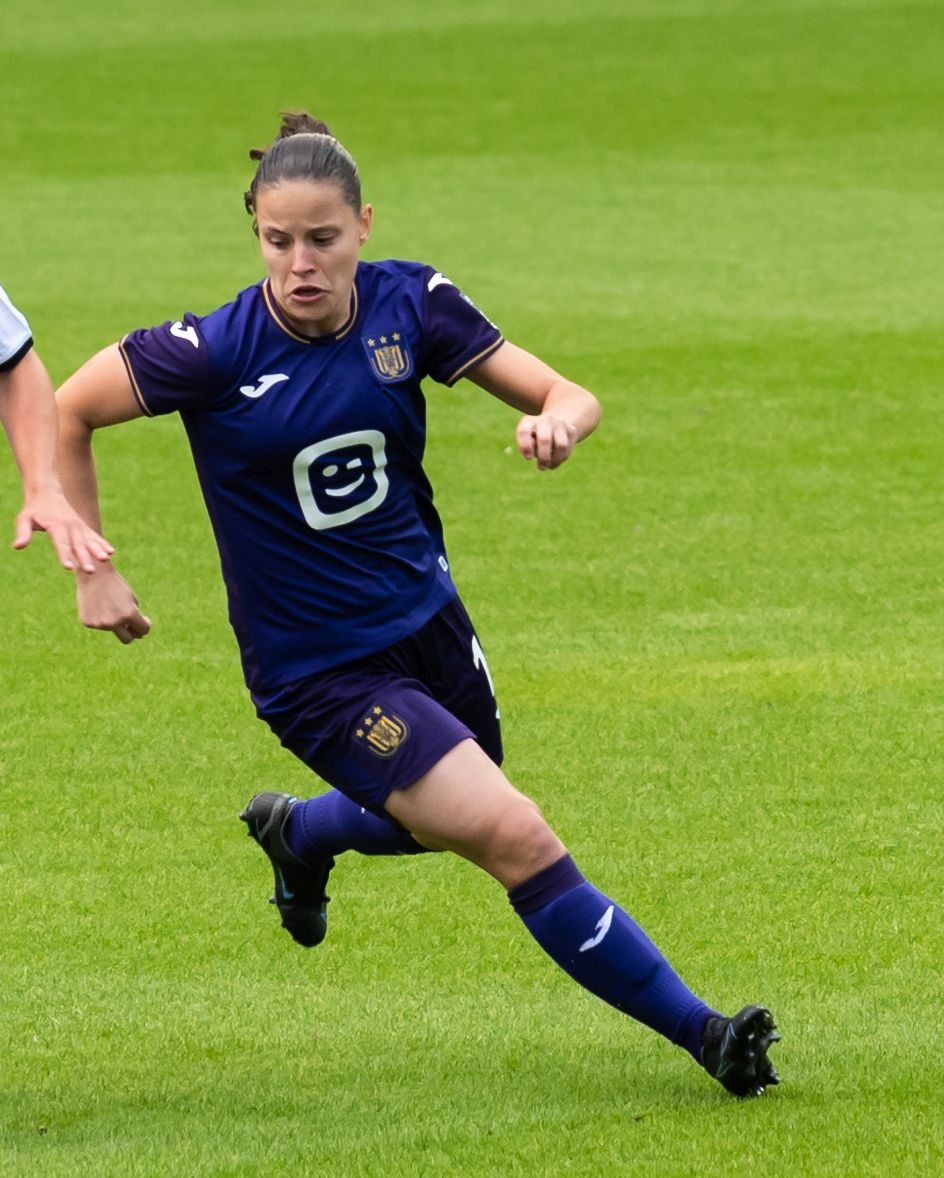
Ștefania Vătafu
