= Romanian Basketball Supercup =

Romanian basketball competition

- Sport: Basketball
- Country: Romania
- Continent: (European Union) Europe
- Most recent champion: U-BT Cluj-Napoca (6th title)
- Most titles: U-BT Cluj-Napoca (6 titles)
- Related competitions: Liga Națională; Romanian Basketball Cup

The Romanian Basketball Cup is an annual supercup game for Romanian basketball teams. The last winner was U-BT Cluj-Napoca in 2025.

The game is played between the winners of the last Liga Națională and the National Cup.

== Finals ==
Year	League winner	Score	Cup winner	Arena	City	Attendance
2014	Asesoft Ploiești	73–57	Energia Târgu Jiu	Dinamo Bucuresti	Bucharest	1,500
2022	U-BT Cluj-Napoca	78-76	CSO-Voluntari	Polyvalent Hall (Craiova)	Craiova	/
2026	U-BT Cluj-Napoca	80-75	CSO-Voluntari		Brasov	/
