= CSU Ploiești =

CSU Petrolul Ploiești
- Leagues: Romanian League
- Founded: 1998
- Arena: Olimpia Sports Hall
- Capacity: 3,500
- Location: Ploiești, Romania
- Team colors: Blue, Yellow, White
- Head coach: Milan Škobalj
- Championships: 11 Romanian Leagues; 6 Romanian Cups; 1 Romanian Supercup; 1 EuroCup Challenge
- Website: https://www.csmploiesti.ro/category/baschet/
Home	Away

CSU Petrolul Ploieşti are a Romanian professional basketball club, based in Ploiești, Romania. The club competes in the Liga Națională, and was the most successful club of Romania in the 21st century, winning ten consecutive championships between 2004–2010 and 2012-2014, as well as six Romanian cups. In 2005, the team won the FIBA EuroCup Challenge. The club was known as CSU Asesoft for most of its existence for sponsorship reasons.

== History ==
Founded in 1998, Asesoft soon established itself as an emerging power with appearances in the Liga Națională finals in 2001 and the semifinals in 2002 and 2003. Asesoft European debut came in the 2003–04 EuroChallenge. That season the team made history by beating Dinamo București for its first Romanian League title. Asesoft then became the first and only Romanian team to win a European title, the 2005 FIBA EuroCup Challenge, edging Lokomotiv Kuban 74-75 in the title game at home with Vladimir Kuzmanović scoring 28 points, including game-winning free throws with 8 seconds left. Its first Eurocup experience came in 2007-08, when they beat Spirou Charleroi and eventual finalist CB Sant Josep, but did not get past the regular season.

Back at home, however, Asesoft has been on a roll the entire decade, conquering seven straight Liga Națională titles from 2004 until 2010. Last season in its Eurocup opener, Asesoft shocked Khimki Moscow 89-97 on the road, but finished the regular season with a 3-7 record. In the Liga Națională, the team won its third consecutive title after making full use of its home-court playoff advantage, winning the deciding Game 5`s of both the semifinal series against U-Mobitelco Cluj, and in the finals against CSM Oradea. Back in the Eurocup, expect Asesoft to be even more competitive this season, especially in front of its fans.

After the 2014–15 season, Asesoft Ploiești was thrown back to the Romanian Second Division, because the team didn't have the finances to play in the highest league. However, the club did not play in the second league as the team disappeared.

== Trophies ==
=== Domestic competitions ===
- Romanian League
  - Winners (11): 2004, 2005, 2006, 2007, 2008, 2009, 2010, 2012, 2013, 2014, 2015
- Romanian Cup
  - Winners (6): 2004, 2005, 2006, 2007, 2008, 2009
- Romanian Supercup
  - Winners (1): 2014

=== European competitions ===
- EuroCup Challenge
  - Winners (1): 2004–05

== Notable players ==
- (Romania) Antonio Alexe
- (Romania) Virgil Stănescu
- (Romania) Virgil Căruţaşu
- (Romania) Cătălin Burlacu
- (Romania) Levente Szijarto
- (Serbia) Vladimir Tica
- (Serbia) Vladimir Kuzmanović
- (Serbia) Vladimir Arnautović
- (Serbia) Nikola Ilić
- (Serbia) Bojan Obradović
- (Serbia) Saša Ocokoljić
- (Montenegro) Nikola Bulatović
- (Lithuania) Marius Runkauskas
- (Lithuania) Arvydas Čepulis

- (United States) Darius Hargrove
- (United States) Chris Cooper
- (United States) Jonte Flowers
- (United States) Kevin Burleson
- (United States) Reggie Elliot
- (United States) Rashard Griffith
- (United States) Dee Brown
- (United States) Reggie Elliott
- (Ghana) Alhaji Mohammed
- (Greece) Michalis Pelekanos
- (Finland) Gerald Lee
- (Croatia) Ante Krapić
- (Bosnia and Herzegovina) Filip Adamović
- (Bulgaria) Bozhidar Avramov
