= Liga Națională (men's basketball) =

Romanian top-tier men's basketball league

- Founded: 1950; 76 years ago
- First season: 1950–51
- Country: Romania
- Confederation: Romanian Basketball Federation
- Divisions: 3
- Number of teams: 24
- Level on pyramid: 1
- Domestic cup: Romanian Cup
- International cup(s): EuroCup; Basketball Champions League; FIBA Europe Cup
- Current champions: U-BT Cluj-Napoca (11th title) (2025–26)
- Most championships: Dinamo București (22 titles)
- TV partners: Digi Sport; Prima Sport
- Website: www.frbaschet.ro
- 2025–2026 season

The Liga Națională de Baschet Masculin (LNBM) (English: National League) is the top-tier professional basketball league of Romania. The winner of the league each season is crowned the Romanian national champion. Founded in 1950, the league consists of 24 teams playing in three different divisions. Currently, the clubs from the Liga Națională also participate in the European competitions, and can qualify for the Basketball Champions League or the FIBA Europe Cup based on their performance in the national league and cup competition. The most successful club in the league's history is Dinamo București, who has won a record 22 titles. Asesoft Ploieşti won the championship seven times in a row between 2004 and 2010, and again between 2012 and 2014. They became the only Romanian team to win a European title with their success in the FIBA EuroCup Challenge in 2005.

== Competition format ==
Prior to 2018, the men's Liga Națională had 12 teams who played the season in three rounds. The regular season, which began in October, was considered the first round and was played in a normal round-robin, home-and-away format. At the end of the regular season, the top six clubs played a play-off round, while the bottom six clubs played a play-out round. The six teams in the play-off round and the top two in the play-out round qualified for the play-offs, which were played using a knockout format. Since 2014, the quarter-finals, semi-finals, and finals have been best of five. The bottom two teams in the play-out round are relegated to Liga I.

In May 2018, the Romanian Basketball Federation's board of directors decided to entirely reform the system. Liga I was dissolved and the Liga Națională was split into three groups; A, B, and C. Group designation depeneds on performance, financial, and infrastructural criteria. The regular season remains a round-robin format within each group. In the second round, the top six teams from Group A advance to the Red Group. The teams placed seventh and eighth in Group A, the top three teams from Group B, and the winner of Group C advance to the Yellow Group. Teams placed fourth through eighth in Group B, along with the runner-up from Group C, are assigned to the Blue Group. The teams placed third through eighth in Group C are assigned to the Green Group.

In the second round of the restructured season, teams in the Red Group keep their points while the Yellow, Blue, and Green Groups all begin with zero points. In the third round of the championship, the first two teams from the Yellow Group join the Red Group teams for the play-offs, which use a knockout format. The quarter-finals, semi-finals, and finals continue to be best of five. To determine the teams ranked between 5th and 8th place, the best of three system is used. Remaining teams form two eight-team groups to determine their final rankings.

== Notable Liga Națională players ==
At least five former Romanian players have been inducted into the European Basketball Hall of Fame.

- Gheorghe Mureșan – initially signed in 1993 with the Washington Bullets and played six seasons in the NBA. He was the tallest player in the league and averaged 9.8 points, 6.4 rebounds, and 0.5 assists. He was named the NBA Most Improved Player following the 1995–96 NBA season. He played for two years with Universitatea Cluj-Napoca.
- Antonio Alexe – played his entire professional career in the Romanian and Hungarian basketball leagues. He was Romanian champion twice with Asesoft Ploiești and once with West Petrom Arad. His career was cut short by his 2005 death in a car accident.
- Constantin Popa – played in Divizia A for BC Dinamo București before joining the University of Miami in the NCAA Division I. He is the tallest player in the history of the school. Though he was drafted by the Los Angeles Clippers in 1995, he did not play in the NBA. He joined the CBA before returning to Europe.
- Cătălin Burlacu – in addition to playing in Romania with West Petrom Arad and Asesoft Ploiești, Burlacu played in the Italian, Estonian, and German basketball leagues. He won the Liga Națională championship with Asesoft Ploiești in 2004-2006, 2008-2010, and 2012-2014.
- Levente Szijarto – spent his career in the Romanian basketball league with West Petrom Arad, U Mobitelco Cluj, and Asesoft Ploiești. He won the championship with Asesoft Ploiești in 2003-2010 and 2012-2014.

== Titles ==
Club	Titles	Winning years
Dinamo București	22	1953, 1954, 1955, 1957, 1965, 1968, 1969, 1970, 1971, 1972, 1973, 1974, 1975, 1976, 1977, 1979, 1983, 1988, 1994, 1997, 1998, 2003
Steaua București	21	1956, 1958, 1959, 1960, 1961, 1962, 1963, 1964, 1966, 1967, 1978, 1980, 1981, 1982, 1984, 1985, 1986, 1987, 1989, 1990, 1991
Asesoft Ploiești	11	2004, 2005, 2006, 2007, 2008, 2009, 2010, 2012, 2013, 2014, 2015
U-BT Cluj-Napoca	11	1992, 1993, 1996, 2011, 2017, 2021, 2022, 2023, 2024, 2025, 2026
CSM Oradea	3	2016, 2018, 2019
Metalul 23 August București	2	1950, 1952
CSU Sibiu	2	1995, 1999
West Petrom Arad	2	2001, 2002
Locomotiva PTT	1	1951
CSU Pitești	1	2000

== Latest finals ==
Season	Champion	Runner-up	Score
2000–01	West Petrom Arad	Asesoft Ploiești	3–0
2001–02	West Petrom Arad	Dinamo București	3–2
2002–03	Dinamo București	West Petrom Arad	3–2
2003–04	Asesoft Ploiești	Dinamo București	3–1
2004–05	Asesoft Ploiești	Dinamo București	3–1
2005–06	Asesoft Ploiești	U Mobitelco Cluj-Napoca	4–1
2006–07	Asesoft Ploiești	Argeș Piteşti	4–1
2007–08	Asesoft Ploiești	U Mobitelco Cluj-Napoca	4–3
2008–09	Asesoft Ploiești	BC Timișoara	4–0
2009–10	Asesoft Ploiești	U Mobitelco Cluj-Napoca	4–0
2010–11	U Mobitelco Cluj-Napoca	Asesoft Ploiești	4–2
2011–12	Asesoft Ploiești	Timișoara	4–0
2012–13	Asesoft Ploiești	BC Mureș	4–2
2013–14	Asesoft Ploiești	CSM Oradea	3–2
2014–15	Asesoft Ploiești	BC Mureș	3–0
2015–16	CSM Oradea	BC Mureș	3–2
2016–17	U-BT Cluj-Napoca	Steaua CSM Eximbank	3–0
2017–18	CSM Oradea	Steaua CSM Eximbank	3–1
2018–19	CSM Oradea	CSU Sibiu	3–1
2019–20	Cancelled due to the COVID-19 pandemic		
2020–21	U-BT Cluj-Napoca	CSM Oradea	3–2
2021–22	U-BT Cluj-Napoca	CSO Voluntari	3–1
2022–23	U-BT Cluj-Napoca	CSM Oradea	4–2
2023–24	U-BT Cluj-Napoca	CSM Oradea	4–1
2024–25	U-BT Cluj-Napoca	CSM Oradea	3–2
2025–26	U-BT Cluj-Napoca	CSM Oradea	3–1

== See also ==
- Romanian Women's Basketball League
