= EuroBasket 2025 squads =

International basketball event

This article displays the squads of the teams that competed in EuroBasket 2025. Each team has a final roster of 12 players; a team can opt to have one naturalized player as per FIBA eligibility rules from its roster.

Age and club were as of the start of the tournament, 27 August 2025.

== Group A ==
=== Czechia ===
A 16-player roster was announced on 24 July. Tomáš Satoranský withdrew due to back injury on 22 August, the same day the final roster was announced.

Czech Republic men's national basketball team – EuroBasket 2025 roster
Players
Coaches

Pos.	No.	Name	Age – Date of birth	Height	Club	Ctr.
C	5	Jan Zídek	25 – 13 December 1999	2.04 m (6 ft 8 in)	CB Sant Antoni	(Spain)
F	7	Vojtěch Hruban (C)	35 – 29 August 1989	2.02 m (6 ft 8 in)	Nymburk	(Czech Republic)
C	11	Adam Kejval	23 – 21 January 2002	2.13 m (7 ft 0 in)	Brno	(Czech Republic)
C	15	Martin Peterka	30 – 12 January 1995	2.03 m (6 ft 8 in)	Dąbrowa Górnicza	(Poland)
F	17	Jaromír Bohačík	33 – 26 May 1992	1.97 m (6 ft 6 in)	Nymburk	(Czech Republic)
PG	19	Ondřej Sehnal	27 – 10 October 1997	1.90 m (6 ft 3 in)	Nymburk	(Czech Republic)
PG	21	Petr Křivánek	22 – 18 May 2003	2.00 m (6 ft 7 in)	Brno	(Czech Republic)
PG	27	Vít Krejčí	25 – 19 June 2000	1.99 m (6 ft 6 in)	Atlanta Hawks	(United States)
C	31	Martin Kříž	32 – 17 June 1993	2.00 m (6 ft 7 in)	Nymburk	(Czech Republic)
G	32	Richard Bálint	22 – 8 November 2002	1.92 m (6 ft 4 in)	Bamberg	(Germany)
C	71	Martin Svoboda	23 – 21 December 2001	2.02 m (6 ft 8 in)	Sokol Písek	(Czech Republic)
SG	77	Tomáš Kyzlink	32 – 18 June 1993	1.95 m (6 ft 5 in)	Jilin Northeast Tigers	(China)

Head coach

- (Spain) Diego Ocampo

Assistant coach(es)

- (Spain) Lluís Riera
- (Czech Republic) Jan Šotnar

Legend

- (C) Team captain
- Club – describes last
  club before the competition
- Age – describes age
  on 27 August 2025

=== Estonia ===
A 22-player roster was announced on 7 July. Maik Kotsar withdrew due to shoulder injury on August 22. The final roster was announced on 25 August.

Estonia men's national basketball team – EuroBasket 2025 roster
Players
Coaches

Pos.	No.	Name	Age – Date of birth	Height	Club	Ctr.
SF	0	Henri Drell	25 – 25 April 2000	2.06 m (6 ft 9 in)	CB Canarias	(Spain)
G	1	Märt Rosenthal	26 – 15 March 1999	1.92 m (6 ft 4 in)	BC Kalev/Cramo	(Estonia)
SF	2	Sander Raieste	26 – 31 March 1999	2.04 m (6 ft 8 in)	UCAM Murcia	(Spain)
PF	3	Kaspar Treier	25 – 19 September 1999	2.04 m (6 ft 8 in)	Napoli Basket	(Italy)
G	7	Mikk Jurkatamm	24 – 18 September 2000	1.96 m (6 ft 5 in)	Avellino Basket	(Italy)
C	9	Matthias Tass	26 – 23 March 1999	2.10 m (6 ft 11 in)	Legia Warsaw	(Poland)
PF	11	Siim-Sander Vene (C)	34 – 12 November 1990	2.03 m (6 ft 8 in)	BC Šiauliai	(Lithuania)
PF	13	Kregor Hermet	28 – 9 June 1997	2.05 m (6 ft 9 in)	BC Kalev/Cramo	(Estonia)
SF	21	Janari Jõesaar	31 – 8 December 1993	1.98 m (6 ft 6 in)	Bosna Royal	(Bosnia and Herzegovina)
G	25	Joonas Riismaa	23 – 6 March 2002	1.99 m (6 ft 6 in)	Cantù	(Italy)
F	34	Artur Konontšuk	25 – 9 May 2000	2.01 m (6 ft 7 in)	Bursaspor	(Turkey)
PG	77	Kristian Kullamäe	26 – 25 May 1999	1.94 m (6 ft 4 in)	BC Lietkabelis	(Lithuania)

Head coach

- (Estonia) Heiko Rannula

Assistant coach(es)

- (Estonia) Kristjan Kangur
- (Estonia) Brett Nõmm
- (Estonia) Indrek Reinbok

Legend

- (C) Team captain
- Club – describes last
  club before the competition
- Age – describes age
  on 27 August 2025

=== Latvia ===
A 25-player roster was announced on 4 July. It was reduced to 20 players on 25 July and further to 17 players on 2 August. Mārtiņš Laksa and Rodions Kurucs withdrew due to injury on August 14 and 20, respectively. The final roster was announced on 24 August, with Toms Skuja being the final cut.

Latvia men's national basketball team – EuroBasket 2025 roster
Players
Coaches

Pos.	No.	Name	Age – Date of birth	Height	Club	Ctr.
PF	5	Mareks Mejeris	33 – 2 September 1991	2.07 m (6 ft 9 in)	U-BT Cluj-Napoca	(Romania)
C	6	Kristaps Porziņģis	30 – 2 August 1995	2.21 m (7 ft 3 in)	Atlanta Hawks	(United States)
F	8	Dāvis Bertāns	32 – 12 November 1992	2.08 m (6 ft 10 in)	Dubai Basketball	(United Arab Emirates)
SG	9	Dairis Bertāns (C)	35 – 9 September 1989	1.93 m (6 ft 4 in)	VEF Rīga	(Latvia)
PF	11	Rolands Šmits	30 – 25 June 1995	2.07 m (6 ft 9 in)	Anadolu Efes	(Turkey)
C	18	Klāvs Čavars	29 – 11 February 1996	2.08 m (6 ft 10 in)	Sabah	(Azerbaijan)
SG	19	Rihards Lomažs	29 – 13 April 1996	1.93 m (6 ft 4 in)	Neptūnas	(Lithuania)
PF	24	Andrejs Gražulis	32 – 21 July 1993	2.02 m (6 ft 8 in)	Joventut Badalona	(Spain)
F	28	Mārcis Šteinbergs	23 – 28 August 2001	2.06 m (6 ft 9 in)	Manresa	(Spain)
SG	47	Artūrs Kurucs	25 – 19 January 2000	1.91 m (6 ft 3 in)	Breogán	(Spain)
PG	55	Artūrs Žagars	25 – 21 April 2000	1.90 m (6 ft 3 in)	Fenerbahce	(Turkey)
PG	66	Kristers Zoriks	27 – 25 May 1998	1.93 m (6 ft 4 in)	Força Lleida	(Spain)

Head coach

- (Italy) Luca Banchi

Assistant coach(es)

- (Latvia) Jānis Gailītis
- (Latvia) Artūrs Visockis-Rubenis

Legend

- (C) Team captain
- Club – describes last club
  before the tournament
- Age – describes age
  on 27 August 2025

=== Portugal ===
A 15-player roster was announced on 18 June. The final roster was announced on 21 August.

Portugal men's national basketball team – EuroBasket 2025 roster
Players
Coaches

Pos.	No.	Name	Age – Date of birth	Height	Club	Ctr.
SG	0	Diogo Brito	28 – 24 April 1997	1.95 m (6 ft 5 in)	Obradoiro	(Spain)
F	2	Vladyslav Voytso	26 – 30 July 1999	2.00 m (6 ft 7 in)	FC Porto	(Portugal)
SG	5	Travante Williams (N)	32 – 29 July 1993	1.97 m (6 ft 6 in)	Le Mans	(France)
SG	6	Francisco Amarante	25 – 24 March 2000	1.95 m (6 ft 5 in)	Sporting	(Portugal)
PG	9	Diogo Ventura	31 – 24 June 1994	1.95 m (6 ft 5 in)	Sporting	(Portugal)
PF	11	Miguel Queiroz (C)	34 – 4 July 1991	2.04 m (6 ft 8 in)	Porto	(Portugal)
PG	13	Diogo Gameiro	30 – 13 August 1995	1.82 m (6 ft 0 in)	Benfica	(Portugal)
C	14	Daniel Relvão	29 – 26 June 1996	2.06 m (6 ft 9 in)	Benfica	(Portugal)
SF	25	Nuno Sá	28 – 25 March 1997	2.00 m (6 ft 7 in)	CB Bahía	(Spain)
PG	28	Rafael Lisboa	25 – 27 November 1999	1.82 m (6 ft 0 in)	Ourense	(Spain)
PF	29	Cândido Sá	32 – 7 November 1992	2.06 m (6 ft 9 in)	Cáceres	(Spain)
C	88	Neemias Queta	26 – 13 July 1999	2.11 m (6 ft 11 in)	Boston Celtics	(United States)

Head coach

- (Portugal) Mário Gomes

Assistant coach(es)

- (Portugal) Sérgio Ramos
- (Portugal) Nuno Tavares

Legend

- (C) Team captain
- (N) Naturalised player
- Club – describes last
  club before the competition
- Age – describes age
  on 27 August 2025

=== Serbia ===
A 17-player roster was announced on 28 July. On 20 August, Uroš Trifunović and Alen Smailagić were removed from the roster after being deemed unavailable due to injuries. The final roster was announced on 23 August, with Balša Koprivica, Dejan Davidovac and Nikola Topić being cut. Team captain Bogdan Bogdanović sustained a hamstring injury in the second group stage game and was sidelined for the remainder of the tournament, with Stefan Jović taking over the captaincy.

Serbia men's national basketball team – EuroBasket 2025 roster
Players
Coaches

Pos.	No.	Name	Age – Date of birth	Height	Club	Ctr.
C	3	Filip Petrušev	25 – 15 April 2000	2.10 m (6 ft 11 in)	Dubai Basketball	(United Arab Emirates)
PF	5	Nikola Jović	22 – 9 June 2003	2.08 m (6 ft 10 in)	Miami Heat	(United States)
SG	7	Bogdan Bogdanović (injured)	33 – 18 August 1992	1.97 m (6 ft 6 in)	Los Angeles Clippers	(United States)
SG	9	Vanja Marinković	28 – 9 January 1997	1.97 m (6 ft 6 in)	Partizan	(Serbia)
PF	11	Tristan Vukčević	22 – 11 March 2003	2.13 m (7 ft 0 in)	Washington Wizards	(United States)
SG	13	Ognjen Dobrić	30 – 27 October 1994	2.00 m (6 ft 7 in)	Crvena zvezda	(Serbia)
C	15	Nikola Jokić	30 – 19 February 1995	2.11 m (6 ft 11 in)	Denver Nuggets	(United States)
PG	22	Vasilije Micić	31 – 13 January 1994	1.95 m (6 ft 5 in)	Hapoel Tel Aviv	(Israel)
SG	23	Marko Gudurić	30 – 8 March 1995	1.97 m (6 ft 6 in)	Olimpia Milano	(Italy)
G	24	Stefan Jović (C)	34 – 3 November 1990	1.96 m (6 ft 5 in)	Valencia Basket	(Spain)
PG	30	Aleksa Avramović	30 – 25 October 1994	1.92 m (6 ft 4 in)	Dubai Basketball	(United Arab Emirates)
C	33	Nikola Milutinov	30 – 30 December 1994	2.13 m (7 ft 0 in)	Olympiacos	(Greece)

Head coach

- (Serbia) (Germany) Svetislav Pešić

Assistant coach(es)

- (Serbia) Nenad Jakovljević
- (Serbia) Oliver Kostić
- (Serbia) Marko Marinović
- (Serbia) Mihajlo Mitić

Legend

- (C) Team captain
- Club – describes last
  club before the tournament
- Age – describes age
  on 27 August 2025

=== Turkey ===
A 16-player roster was announced on 2 July. On 18 August, Sarper David Mutaf was cut from the roster. The final roster was announced on 24 August, with Yiğitcan Saybir, Yiğit Arslan and Berk Uğurlu cut from the squad.

Turkey men's national basketball team – EuroBasket 2025 roster
Players
Coaches

Pos.	No.	Name	Age – Date of birth	Height	Club	Ctr.
PG	0	Shane Larkin (N)	32 – 2 October 1992	1.82 m (6 ft 0 in)	Anadolu Efes	(Turkey)
SG	2	Şehmus Hazer	26 – 15 February 1999	1.90 m (6 ft 3 in)	Anadolu Efes	(Turkey)
C	5	Sertaç Şanlı	34 – 5 August 1991	2.14 m (7 ft 0 in)	Fenerbahçe	(Turkey)
SF	6	Cedi Osman (C)	30 – 8 April 1995	2.00 m (6 ft 7 in)	Panathinaikos	(Greece)
SF	10	Onuralp Bitim	26 – 31 March 1999	1.96 m (6 ft 5 in)	Fenerbahçe	(Turkey)
SG	22	Furkan Korkmaz	28 – 24 July 1997	2.00 m (6 ft 7 in)	Bahçeşehir	(Turkey)
PF	23	Alperen Şengün	23 – 25 July 2002	2.06 m (6 ft 9 in)	Houston Rockets	(United States)
C	24	Ercan Osmani	27 – 4 April 1998	2.13 m (7 ft 0 in)	Anadolu Efes	(Turkey)
PF	30	Adem Bona	22 – 28 March 2003	2.06 m (6 ft 9 in)	Philadelphia 76ers	(United States)
SF	33	Erkan Yılmaz	27 – 3 December 1997	1.92 m (6 ft 4 in)	Anadolu Efes	(Turkey)
PG	55	Kenan Sipahi	30 – 26 May 1995	1.97 m (6 ft 6 in)	Bahçeşehir	(Turkey)
C	77	Ömer Yurtseven	27 – 19 June 1998	2.13 m (7 ft 0 in)	Panathinaikos	(Greece)

Head coach

- (Turkey) Ergin Ataman

Assistant coach(es)

- (Turkey) Ender Arslan
- (Turkey) Yakup Sekizkök

Legend

- (C) Team captain
- (N) Naturalised player
- Club – describes last
  club before the tournament
- Age – describes age
  on 27 August 2025

== Group B ==
=== Finland ===
A 16-player roster was announced on 29 July. The final roster was announced on 22 August.

Finland men's national basketball team – EuroBasket 2025 roster
Players
Coaches

Pos.	No.	Name	Age – Date of birth	Height	Club	Ctr.
G	1	Miro Little	21 – 30 May 2004	1.93 m (6 ft 4 in)	UC Santa Barbara	(United States)
SG	9	Sasu Salin (C)	34 – 11 June 1991	1.91 m (6 ft 3 in)	Estudiantes	(Spain)
PF	13	Olivier Nkamhoua	25 – 2 May 2000	2.03 m (6 ft 8 in)	Varese	(Italy)
PF	18	Mikael Jantunen	25 – 20 April 2000	2.04 m (6 ft 8 in)	Fenerbahçe	(Turkey)
SF	19	Elias Valtonen	26 – 11 June 1999	2.01 m (6 ft 7 in)	Granada	(Spain)
C	20	Alexander Madsen	30 – 26 January 1995	2.08 m (6 ft 10 in)	Força Lleida CE	(Spain)
PG	21	Edon Maxhuni	27 – 21 March 1998	1.88 m (6 ft 2 in)	Gravelines-Dunkerque	(France)
PF	23	Lauri Markkanen	28 – 22 May 1997	2.13 m (7 ft 0 in)	Utah Jazz	(United States)
F	24	Miikka Muurinen	18 – 4 March 2007	2.10 m (6 ft 11 in)	AZ Compass Prep	(United States)
G	30	Andre Gustavson	26 – 7 May 1999	1.95 m (6 ft 5 in)	Karhu Basket	(Finland)
SG	34	Jacob Grandison	27 – 2 April 1998	1.98 m (6 ft 6 in)	PAOK	(Greece)
PG	35	Ilari Seppälä	32 – 27 March 1993	1.88 m (6 ft 2 in)	Kecskeméti TE	(Hungary)

Head coach

- (Finland) Lassi Tuovi

Assistant coach(es)

- (Finland) Hanno Möttölä
- (Finland) Teemu Rannikko

Legend

- (C) Team captain
- Club – describes last
  club before the competition
- Age – describes age
  on 27 August 2025

=== Germany ===
A 16-player roster was announced on 21 July. Tim Schneider and Christian Anderson Jr. were cut from the roster on 6 and 18 August, respectively. On 23 August, David Krämer withdrew due to muscle injury. A day later, the final roster was announced, with Nelson Weidemann being the final cut.

Germany men's national basketball team – EuroBasket 2025 roster
Players
Coaches

Pos.	No.	Name	Age – Date of birth	Height	Club	Ctr.
SF	0	Isaac Bonga	25 – 8 November 1999	2.03 m (6 ft 8 in)	Partizan	(Serbia)
PF	1	Oscar da Silva	26 – 21 September 1998	2.05 m (6 ft 9 in)	Bayern Munich	(Germany)
PG	4	Maodo Lô	32 – 31 December 1992	1.91 m (6 ft 3 in)	Žalgiris	(Lithuania)
SF	5	Tristan da Silva	24 – 15 May 2001	2.03 m (6 ft 8 in)	Orlando Magic	(United States)
C	7	Johannes Voigtmann	32 – 30 September 1992	2.11 m (6 ft 11 in)	Bayern Munich	(Germany)
G	9	Franz Wagner	24 – 27 August 2001	2.08 m (6 ft 10 in)	Orlando Magic	(United States)
PF	10	Daniel Theis	33 – 4 April 1992	2.03 m (6 ft 8 in)	AS Monaco	(France)
PG	17	Dennis Schröder (C)	31 – 15 September 1993	1.88 m (6 ft 2 in)	Sacramento Kings	(United States)
PG	21	Justus Hollatz	24 – 21 April 2001	1.95 m (6 ft 5 in)	Bayern Munich	(Germany)
PF	32	Johannes Thiemann	31 – 9 February 1994	2.05 m (6 ft 9 in)	Gunma Crane Thunders	(Japan)
C	34	Leon Kratzer	28 – 4 February 1997	2.12 m (6 ft 11 in)	Bayern Munich	(Germany)
SG	42	Andreas Obst	29 – 13 July 1996	1.91 m (6 ft 3 in)	Bayern Munich	(Germany)

Head coach

- (Spain) Álex Mumbrú

Assistant coach(es)

- (Australia) (Bosnia and Herzegovina) Alan Ibrahimagić
- (Spain) Alberto Miranda

Legend

- (C) Team captain
- (N) Naturalised player
- Club – describes last
  club before the tournament
- Age – describes age
  on 27 August 2025

=== Great Britain ===
An 18-player roster was announced on 1 August. The final roster was announced on 25 August.

Great Britain men's national basketball team – EuroBasket 2025 roster
Players
Coaches

Pos.	No.	Name	Age – Date of birth	Height	Club	Ctr.
C	0	Gabriel Olaseni	33 – 29 December 1991	2.10 m (6 ft 11 in)	Mersin	(Turkey)
SF	2	Joshua Ward-Hibbert	31 – 25 January 1994	1.98 m (6 ft 6 in)	Newcastle Eagles	(United Kingdom)
G	5	Amin Adamu	27 – 3 October 1997	1.96 m (6 ft 5 in)	London Lions	(United Kingdom)
PG	6	Luke Nelson	30 – 29 June 1995	1.91 m (6 ft 3 in)	Soproni	(Hungary)
PG	7	Jelani Watson-Gayle	26 – 9 September 1998	1.82 m (6 ft 0 in)	Slavia Prague	(Czech Republic)
PG	12	Tarik Phillip	32 – 10 August 1993	1.91 m (6 ft 3 in)	London Lions	(United Kingdom)
C	13	Jubrile Belo	27 – 27 June 1998	2.06 m (6 ft 9 in)	Falco Szombathely	(Hungary)
F	15	Akwasi Yeboah	28 – 15 June 1997	1.98 m (6 ft 6 in)	Trabzonspor	(Turkey)
F	22	Myles Hesson	35 – 5 June 1990	1.97 m (6 ft 6 in)	Neptūnas	(Lithuania)
G	24	Carl Wheatle (C)	27 – 24 March 1998	1.95 m (6 ft 5 in)	Reyer Venezia	(Italy)
C	30	Daniel Akin	27 – 16 June 1998	2.06 m (6 ft 9 in)	Kolossos Rodou	(Greece)
G	32	Patrick Whelan	29 – 25 August 1996	1.96 m (6 ft 5 in)	Falco Szombathely	(Hungary)

Head coach

- (United Kingdom) Marc Stuetel

Assistant coach(es)

- (Greece) Andreas Kapoulas
- (Spain) Alberto Lorenzo

Legend

- (C) Team captain
- Club – describes last
  club before the competition
- Age – describes age
  on 27 August 2025

=== Lithuania ===
A 16-player roster was announced on 4 July. On 1 July, Ignas Brazdeikis withdrew due to ankle injury. The final roster was announced on 24 August, with Eimantas Bendžius, Kristupas Žemaitis and Mantas Rubštavičius cut from the squad.

Lithuania men's national basketball team – EuroBasket 2025 roster
Players
Coaches

Pos.	No.	Name	Age – Date of birth	Height	Club	Ctr.
C	1	Marek Blaževič	23 – 1 September 2001	2.09 m (6 ft 10 in)	Tofaş	(Turkey)
SG	2	Margiris Normantas	28 – 27 October 1996	1.94 m (6 ft 4 in)	Bilbao	(Spain)
PG	3	Arnas Velička	25 – 10 December 1999	1.95 m (6 ft 5 in)	Neptūnas	(Lithuania)
SF	7	Gytis Radzevičius	30 – 17 August 1995	1.97 m (6 ft 6 in)	Rytas Vilnius	(Lithuania)
SF	8	Tadas Sedekerskis	27 – 17 January 1998	2.06 m (6 ft 9 in)	Saski Baskonia	(Spain)
PF	10	Ąžuolas Tubelis	23 – 22 March 2002	2.05 m (6 ft 9 in)	Žalgiris	(Lithuania)
PG	13	Rokas Jokubaitis	24 – 19 November 2000	1.93 m (6 ft 4 in)	Bayern Munich	(Germany)
C	15	Laurynas Birutis	28 – 27 August 1997	2.13 m (7 ft 0 in)	Žalgiris	(Lithuania)
C	17	Jonas Valančiūnas (C)	33 – 6 May 1992	2.11 m (6 ft 11 in)	Denver Nuggets	(United States)
SF	31	Rokas Giedraitis	33 – 16 August 1992	2.00 m (6 ft 7 in)	Canarias	(Spain)
G	43	Ignas Sargiūnas	25 – 11 September 1999	1.94 m (6 ft 4 in)	Rytas Vilnius	(Lithuania)
SF	91	Deividas Sirvydis	25 – 10 June 2000	2.04 m (6 ft 8 in)	Žalgiris	(Lithuania)

Head coach

- (Lithuania) Rimas Kurtinaitis

Assistant coach(es)

- (Lithuania) Tomas Pačėsas
- (Lithuania) Andrius Ulčickas

Legend

- (C) Team captain
- Club – describes last club
  before the tournament
- Age – describes age
  on 27 August 2025

=== Montenegro ===
A 25-player roster was announced on 1 July. It was reduced to 15 players on 9 July. The final roster was announced on 22 August, the same day Jovan Kljajić withdrew due to injury.

Montenegro men's national basketball team – EuroBasket 2025 roster
Players
Coaches

Pos.	No.	Name	Age – Date of birth	Height	Club	Ctr.
G	0	Kyle Allman Jr. (N)	27 – 2 September 1997	1.91 m (6 ft 3 in)	Türk Telekom	(Turkey)
G	3	Vladimir Mihailović	35 – 10 August 1990	1.94 m (6 ft 4 in)	Zadar	(Croatia)
C	4	Nikola Vučević (C)	34 – 24 October 1990	2.13 m (7 ft 0 in)	Chicago Bulls	(United States)
SF	7	Andrija Slavković	26 – 15 February 1999	2.02 m (6 ft 8 in)	Budućnost	(Montenegro)
F	8	Emir Hadžibegović	29 – 24 August 1996	2.06 m (6 ft 9 in)	Studentski centar	(Montenegro)
C	9	Marko Simonović	25 – 15 October 1999	2.13 m (7 ft 0 in)	Türk Telekom	(Turkey)
PF	10	Bojan Tomašević	24 – 20 June 2001	2.03 m (6 ft 8 in)	Free agent
SF	11	Zoran Vučeljić	21 – 9 September 2003	1.97 m (6 ft 6 in)	Studentski centar	(Montenegro)
G	13	Đorđije Jovanović	22 – 15 May 2003	1.97 m (6 ft 6 in)	Budućnost	(Montenegro)
G	17	Balša Živanović	24 – 6 April 2001	2.00 m (6 ft 7 in)	Studentski centar	(Montenegro)
C	19	Zoran Nikolić	29 – 1 April 1996	2.05 m (6 ft 9 in)	Free agent
PG	22	Igor Drobnjak	25 – 21 April 2000	1.93 m (6 ft 4 in)	Spartak Subotica	(Serbia)

Head coach

- (Montenegro) Boško Radović

Assistant coach(es)

- (Montenegro) Boško Boškovič
- (Montenegro) Vladimir Todorović

Legend

- (C) Team captain
- (N) Naturalised player
- Club – describes last
  club before the competition
- Age – describes age
  on 27 August 2025

=== Sweden ===
A 16-player roster was announced on 26 June. On 15 July, Bobi Klintman withdrew to focus on recovering from injury. Christopher Czerapowicz withdrew due to injury on 7 August.

Sweden men's national basketball team – EuroBasket 2025 roster
Players
Coaches

Pos.	No.	Name	Age – Date of birth	Height	Club	Ctr.
PF	1	Denzel Andersson	28 – 21 September 1996	2.04 m (6 ft 8 in)	Dziki Warsaw	(Poland)
C	2	Adam Ramstedt	30 – 24 July 1995	2.09 m (6 ft 10 in)	BG Göttingen	(Germany)
SF	5	Wilhelm Falk	22 – 25 June 2003	2.01 m (6 ft 7 in)	UCAM Murcia	(Spain)
SG	6	Tobias Borg	31 – 2 November 1993	1.84 m (6 ft 0 in)	Palencia	(Spain)
F	9	Pelle Larsson	24 – 23 February 2001	1.94 m (6 ft 4 in)	Miami Heat	(United States)
PG	12	Ludvig Håkanson (C)	29 – 22 March 1996	1.89 m (6 ft 2 in)	Joventut Badalona	(Spain)
C	15	Mattias Markusson	29 – 10 April 1996	2.17 m (7 ft 1 in)	Chorale Roanne Basket	(France)
F	16	Nick Spires	31 – 25 February 1994	2.11 m (6 ft 11 in)	Södertälje	(Sweden)
SF	18	Viktor Gaddefors	32 – 8 October 1992	2.01 m (6 ft 7 in)	New Taipei CTBC DEA	(Chinese Taipei)
G	19	Melwin Pantzar	25 – 10 April 2000	1.88 m (6 ft 2 in)	Málaga	(Spain)
PG	31	Barra Njie	24 – 13 January 2001	1.91 m (6 ft 3 in)	Braunschweig	(Germany)
C	35	Simon Birgander	27 – 23 October 1997	2.09 m (6 ft 10 in)	Joventut Badalona	(Spain)

Head coach

- (Finland) (Sweden) Mikko Riipinen

Assistant coach(es)

- (Sweden) Joakim Källman
- (Sweden) Ludwig Degernäs
- (Sweden) Adam Engström

Legend

- (C) Team captain
- Club – describes last
  club before the competition
- Age – describes age
  on 27 August 2025

== Group C ==
=== Bosnia and Herzegovina ===
A 24-player roster was announced on 4 July. On 20 August, Xavier Castañeda withdrew due to injury and was replaced by John Roberson. On the same day, Džanan Musa withdrew to focus on recovering from abdominal wall surgery. The final roster was announced on 21 August.

Bosnia and Herzegovina men's national basketball team – EuroBasket 2025 roster
Players
Coaches

Pos.	No.	Name	Age – Date of birth	Height	Club	Ctr.
C	0	Jusuf Nurkić	31 – 23 August 1994	2.14 m (7 ft 0 in)	Utah Jazz	(United States)
PG	2	John Roberson (N)	36 – 28 October 1988	1.80 m (5 ft 11 in)	Esenler Erokspor	(Turkey)
PF	3	Amar Alibegović	30 – 31 March 1995	2.02 m (6 ft 8 in)	Trapani Shark	(Italy)
G	4	Adnan Arslanagić	28 – 26 August 1997	1.82 m (6 ft 0 in)	Bosna	(Bosnia and Herzegovina)
SF	5	Edin Atić	28 – 19 January 1997	2.01 m (6 ft 7 in)	Bosna	(Bosnia and Herzegovina)
PF	7	Miralem Halilović (C)	34 – 22 July 1991	2.05 m (6 ft 9 in)	Bosna	(Bosnia and Herzegovina)
G	9	Amar Gegić	27 – 14 February 1998	2.00 m (6 ft 7 in)	KK Zadar	(Croatia)
SF	11	Ajdin Penava	28 – 11 March 1997	2.06 m (6 ft 9 in)	Śląsk Wrocław	(Poland)
SF	17	Aleksandar Lazić	29 – 10 June 1996	2.01 m (6 ft 7 in)	Zhejiang Golden Bulls	(China)
SG	23	Tarik Hrelja	19 – 9 May 2006	1.94 m (6 ft 4 in)	Igokea	(Bosnia and Herzegovina)
SF	27	Adin Vrabac	31 – 27 January 1994	2.05 m (6 ft 9 in)	Szolnoki Olajbányász	(Hungary)
C	34	Kenan Kamenjaš	25 – 17 January 2000	2.05 m (6 ft 9 in)	Dubai Basketball	(United Arab Emirates)

Head coach

- (Bosnia and Herzegovina) Adis Bećiragić

Assistant coach(es)

- (Bosnia and Herzegovina) Alen Abaz
- (Bosnia and Herzegovina) Gordan Firić

Legend

- (C) Team captain
- (N) Naturalised player
- Club – describes last
  club before the competition
- Age – describes age
  on 27 August 2025

=== Cyprus ===
A 16-player roster was announced on 4 July. The final roster was announced on 25 August.

Cyprus men's national basketball team – EuroBasket 2025 roster
Players
Coaches

Pos.	No.	Name	Age – Date of birth	Height	Club	Ctr.
C	1	Christos Loizides	34 – 26 May 1991	2.04 m (6 ft 8 in)	AEK Larnaca	(Cyprus)
SG	3	Konstantinos Simitzis	30 – 12 August 1995	1.84 m (6 ft 0 in)	AEK Larnaca	(Cyprus)
PF	4	Ioannis Pasiali	27 – 1 November 1997	2.01 m (6 ft 7 in)	Keravnos	(Cyprus)
PG	5	Simon Michail	33 – 19 June 1992	1.83 m (6 ft 0 in)	Keravnos	(Cyprus)
G	6	Stefanos Iliadis	30 – 17 September 1994	1.86 m (6 ft 1 in)	Apollon	(Cyprus)
SF	7	Antreas Christodoulou	30 – 22 February 1995	1.97 m (6 ft 6 in)	Limassol	(Cyprus)
F	9	Aeneas Jung	23 – 13 February 2002	2.03 m (6 ft 8 in)	Kirchheim Knights	(Germany)
SG	10	Ioannis Giannaras	26 – 27 March 1999	1.87 m (6 ft 2 in)	AEK Larnaca	(Cyprus)
C	11	Michalis Koumis	28 – 8 November 1996	2.02 m (6 ft 8 in)	Keravnos	(Cyprus)
PG	13	Filippos Tigkas	22 – 5 November 2002	1.84 m (6 ft 0 in)	Keravnos	(Cyprus)
F	21	Darral Willis (N)	29 – 21 January 1996	2.06 m (6 ft 9 in)	Taipei Taishin Mars	(Chinese Taipei)
F	99	Nikolaos Stylianou (C)	36 – 9 November 1988	1.98 m (6 ft 6 in)	Keravnos	(Cyprus)

Head coach

- (Cyprus) Christophoros Livadiotis

Assistant coach(es)

- (Venezuela) Pablo Cano
- (Cyprus) Stelios Gregoriou
- (Cyprus) Michael Matsentides

Legend

- (C) Team captain
- (N) Naturalised player
- Club – describes last
  club before the competition
- Age – describes age
  on 27 August 2025

=== Georgia ===
A 16-player roster was announced on 18 July.

Georgia men's national basketball team – EuroBasket 2025 roster
Players
Coaches

Pos.	No.	Name	Age – Date of birth	Height	Club	Ctr.
PG	4	Rati Andronikashvili	24 – 19 March 2001	1.95 m (6 ft 5 in)	Obradoiro	(Spain)
F	5	Sandro Mamukelashvili	26 – 23 May 1999	2.08 m (6 ft 10 in)	Toronto Raptors	(Canada)
SF	6	Kakhaber Jintcharadze	32 – 16 July 1993	1.96 m (6 ft 5 in)	Amra Gagra	(Georgia (country))
PF	7	Beka Burjanadze	31 – 3 January 1994	2.01 m (6 ft 7 in)	Coruña	(Spain)
C	9	Giorgi Shermadini	36 – 2 April 1989	2.16 m (7 ft 1 in)	Canarias	(Spain)
SG	10	Duda Sanadze	33 – 25 July 1992	1.96 m (6 ft 5 in)	Al-Nasr	(United Arab Emirates)
PF	12	George Korsantia	27 – 11 January 1998	2.03 m (6 ft 8 in)	Gipuzkoa Basket	(Spain)
F	15	Aleksandre Phevadze	27 – 15 April 1998	2.02 m (6 ft 8 in)	TSU	(Georgia (country))
F	23	Tornike Shengelia (C)	33 – 5 October 1991	2.07 m (6 ft 9 in)	FC Barcelona	(Spain)
C	35	Goga Bitadze	26 – 20 July 1999	2.13 m (7 ft 0 in)	Orlando Magic	(United States)
PG	44	Kamar Baldwin (N)	27 – 15 September 1997	1.85 m (6 ft 1 in)	Bayern Munich	(Germany)
PG	77	Giorgi Ochkhikidze	21 – 5 June 2004	1.92 m (6 ft 4 in)	BC Batumi	(Georgia (country))

Head coach

- (Serbia) Aleksandar Džikić

Assistant coach(es)

- (Georgia (country)) Anatoli Boisa
- (Spain) Marco Esposito

Legend

- (C) Team captain
- (N) Naturalised player
- Club – describes last
  club before the competition
- Age – describes age
  on 27 August 2025

=== Greece ===
A 19-player roster was announced on 22 July. On 29 July, Thanasis Antetokounmpo replaced Neoklis Avdalas. The final roster was announced on 24 August.

Greece men's national basketball team – EuroBasket 2025 roster
Players
Coaches

Pos.	No.	Name	Age – Date of birth	Height	Club	Ctr.
SG	2	Tyler Dorsey (N)	29 – 18 February 1996	1.95 m (6 ft 5 in)	Olympiacos	(Greece)
G	5	Giannoulis Larentzakis	31 – 22 September 1993	1.96 m (6 ft 5 in)	Olympiacos	(Greece)
G	7	Vassilis Toliopoulos	29 – 15 June 1996	1.88 m (6 ft 2 in)	Panathinaikos	(Greece)
G	10	Kostas Sloukas	35 – 15 January 1990	1.92 m (6 ft 4 in)	Panathinaikos	(Greece)
SF	11	Panagiotis Kalaitzakis	26 – 2 January 1999	1.98 m (6 ft 6 in)	Panathinaikos	(Greece)
SF	16	Kostas Papanikolaou (C)	35 – 31 July 1990	2.03 m (6 ft 8 in)	Olympiacos	(Greece)
PG	19	Dimitrios Katsivelis	33 – 1 October 1991	1.94 m (6 ft 4 in)	AEK Athens	(Greece)
PF	20	Alexandros Samodurov	20 – 20 April 2005	2.11 m (6 ft 11 in)	Panathinaikos	(Greece)
SF	34	Giannis Antetokounmpo	30 – 6 December 1994	2.11 m (6 ft 11 in)	Milwaukee Bucks	(United States)
C	37	Kostas Antetokounmpo	27 – 20 November 1997	2.09 m (6 ft 10 in)	Olympiacos	(Greece)
PF	43	Thanasis Antetokounmpo	33 – 18 July 1992	2.01 m (6 ft 7 in)	Milwaukee Bucks	(United States)
PF	44	Dinos Mitoglou	29 – 11 June 1996	2.10 m (6 ft 11 in)	Panathinaikos	(Greece)

Head coach

- (Greece) Vassilis Spanoulis

Assistant coach(es)

- (Greece) Kostas Charalampidis
- (Greece) Michail Kalavros
- (Greece) Diamantis Panagiotopoulos

Legend

- (C) Team captain
- (N) Naturalised player
- Club – describes last
  club before the tournament
- Age – describes age
  on 27 August 2025

=== Italy ===
An 18-player roster was announced on 18 July. On 28 July, Dame Sarr withdrew in order to focus on his college career. On 30 July, Donte DiVincenzo withdrew due to injury and was replaced by Darius Thompson. On 4 August, Giordano Bortolani and Guglielmo Caruso were cut from the roster. On 18 August, Luca Severini was cut from the roster. A day later, Stefano Tonut withdrew due to injury.

Italy men's national basketball team – EuroBasket 2025 roster
Players
Coaches

Pos.	No.	Name	Age – Date of birth	Height	Club	Ctr.
PF	8	Danilo Gallinari	37 – 7 August 1988	2.08 m (6 ft 10 in)	Vaqueros de Bayamón	(Puerto Rico)
PF	9	Nicolò Melli (C)	34 – 26 January 1991	2.06 m (6 ft 9 in)	Fenerbahçe	(Turkey)
F	13	Simone Fontecchio	29 – 5 December 1995	2.03 m (6 ft 8 in)	Miami Heat	(United States)
G	15	Darius Thompson (N)	30 – 4 May 1995	1.92 m (6 ft 4 in)	Valencia	(Spain)
PF	17	Giampaolo Ricci	33 – 27 September 1991	2.02 m (6 ft 8 in)	Olimpia Milano	(Italy)
G	18	Matteo Spagnolo	22 – 10 January 2003	1.93 m (6 ft 4 in)	Saski Baskonia	(Spain)
SF	19	Gabriele Procida	23 – 1 June 2002	1.98 m (6 ft 6 in)	Real Madrid	(Spain)
F	20	Saliou Niang	21 – 14 May 2004	1.99 m (6 ft 6 in)	Virtus Bologna	(Italy)
PG	33	Marco Spissu	30 – 5 February 1995	1.85 m (6 ft 1 in)	Zaragoza	(Spain)
C	35	Mouhamet Diouf	23 – 10 September 2001	2.06 m (6 ft 9 in)	Virtus Bologna	(Italy)
F	45	Nicola Akele	29 – 7 November 1995	2.03 m (6 ft 8 in)	Virtus Bologna	(Italy)
PG	54	Alessandro Pajola	25 – 9 November 1999	1.94 m (6 ft 4 in)	Virtus Bologna	(Italy)

Head coach

- (Italy) Gianmarco Pozzecco

Assistant coach(es)

- (Italy) Edoardo Casalone
- (Italy) Federico Fucà

Legend

- (C) Team captain
- (N) Naturalised player
- Club – describes last
  club before the tournament
- Age – describes age
  on 27 August 2025

=== Spain ===
A 15-player roster was announced on 2 July. On 16 July, Lorenzo Brown withdrew due to personal reasons and was replaced by Mario Saint-Supéry. On 6 August, Eli Ndiaye withdrew due to shoulder injury. Guillem Ferrando and Isaac Nogués were added to the roster on August 10 and 12 respectively, but were subsequently cut. On 17 August, Alberto Abalde withdrew due to injury. The final roster was announced on 21 August, the same day Alberto Díaz withdrew due to injury.

Spain men's national basketball team – EuroBasket 2025 roster
Players
Coaches

Pos.	No.	Name	Age – Date of birth	Height	Club	Ctr.
SF	2	Josep Puerto	26 – 8 March 1999	1.99 m (6 ft 6 in)	Valencia	(Spain)
PG	3	Sergio de Larrea	19 – 4 December 2005	1.98 m (6 ft 6 in)	Valencia	(Spain)
PF	4	Jaime Pradilla	24 – 3 January 2001	2.02 m (6 ft 8 in)	Valencia	(Spain)
PG	5	Mario Saint-Supéry	19 – 14 April 2006	1.92 m (6 ft 4 in)	Gonzaga Bulldogs	(United States)
SF	6	Xabier López-Arostegui	28 – 19 May 1997	2.00 m (6 ft 7 in)	Valencia	(Spain)
PF	7	Santi Aldama	24 – 10 January 2001	2.11 m (6 ft 11 in)	Memphis Grizzlies	(United States)
SG	8	Darío Brizuela	30 – 8 November 1994	1.88 m (6 ft 2 in)	FC Barcelona	(Spain)
C	14	Willy Hernangómez (C)	31 – 27 May 1994	2.10 m (6 ft 11 in)	FC Barcelona	(Spain)
SF	22	Santiago Yusta	28 – 28 April 1997	2.00 m (6 ft 7 in)	Zaragoza	(Spain)
F	41	Juancho Hernangómez	29 – 28 September 1995	2.06 m (6 ft 9 in)	Panathinaikos	(Greece)
SF	44	Joel Parra	25 – 4 April 2000	2.02 m (6 ft 8 in)	FC Barcelona	(Spain)
C	77	Yankuba Sima	29 – 28 July 1996	2.11 m (6 ft 11 in)	Valencia	(Spain)

Head coach

- (Italy) Sergio Scariolo

Assistant coach(es)

- (Spain) Salvador Camps
- (Spain) Víctor García

Legend

- (C) Team captain
- Club – describes last
  club before the tournament
- Age – describes age
  on 27 August 2025

== Group D ==
=== Belgium ===
A 17-player roster was announced on 16 July. The roster was reduced to 15 players on 13 August. The final roster was announced on 25 August.

Belgium men's national basketball team – EuroBasket 2025 roster
Players
Coaches

Pos.	No.	Name	Age – Date of birth	Height	Club	Ctr.
PG	4	Manu Lecomte	30 – 16 April 1995	1.80 m (5 ft 11 in)	Vâlcea	(Romania)
PF	8	Jean-Marc Mwema (C)	35 – 5 December 1989	1.95 m (6 ft 5 in)	Alicante	(Spain)
F	10	Hans Vanwijn	30 – 15 February 1995	2.07 m (6 ft 9 in)	Merkezefendi	(Turkey)
SG	11	Loïc Schwartz	32 – 4 December 1992	1.98 m (6 ft 6 in)	Saint-Quentin	(France)
C	16	Kevin Tumba	34 – 23 February 1991	2.06 m (6 ft 9 in)	Antwerp Giants	(Belgium)
C	19	Ismaël Bako	29 – 10 October 1995	2.08 m (6 ft 10 in)	Paris Basketball	(France)
PF	24	Andy Van Vliet	30 – 27 July 1995	2.11 m (6 ft 11 in)	Rostock Seawolves	(Germany)
F	29	Siebe Ledegen	22 – 6 January 2003	1.98 m (6 ft 6 in)	Okapi Aalst	(Belgium)
G	34	Niels Van Den Eynde	24 – 27 December 2000	1.80 m (5 ft 11 in)	Okapi Aalst	(Belgium)
SF	36	Joppe Mennes	22 – 20 May 2003	1.97 m (6 ft 6 in)	Oostende	(Belgium)
PF	41	Godwin Tshimanga	24 – 25 January 2001	2.02 m (6 ft 8 in)	Brussels	(Belgium)
SF	44	Mamadou Guisse	23 – 15 December 2001	1.99 m (6 ft 6 in)	Limoges	(France)

Head coach

- (Croatia) (Belgium) Dario Gjergja

Assistant coach(es)

- (Belgium) Kristof Michiels
- (Belgium) Raymond Westphalen

Legend

- (C) Team captain
- Club – describes last
  club before the competition
- Age – describes age
  on 27 August 2025

=== France ===
An 18-player roster was announced on 27 June. On 13 July, Mathias Lessort withdrew due to injury and was replaced by Yoan Makoundou, who was later cut from the roster on 4 August. On 8 August, the roster was reduced to 14 players, with Frank Ntilikina, Moussa Diabaté and Ousmane Dieng cut from the squad. On 16 August, Vincent Poirier withdrew due to knee injury. Moussa Diabaté, who was previously cut from the roster, was called up to replace Poirier, but declined in order to focus on the upcoming NBA season. The final roster was announced on 17 August, with Nadir Hifi being the final cut. On 24 August, Matthew Strazel withdrew due to thigh injury. Since the deadline had not expired, he was replaced by Nadir Hifi, who was the final cut.

France men's national basketball team – EuroBasket 2025 roster
Players
Coaches

Pos.	No.	Name	Age – Date of birth	Height	Club	Ctr.
PG	00	Sylvain Francisco	27 – 10 October 1997	1.85 m (6 ft 1 in)	Žalgiris	(Lithuania)
PG	0	Élie Okobo	27 – 23 October 1997	1.91 m (6 ft 3 in)	AS Monaco	(France)
SG	2	Nadir Hifi	23 – 16 July 2002	1.88 m (6 ft 2 in)	Paris Basketball	(France)
SF	3	Timothé Luwawu-Cabarrot	30 – 9 May 1995	2.01 m (6 ft 7 in)	Saski Baskonia	(Spain)
PF	7	Guerschon Yabusele (C)	29 – 17 December 1995	2.03 m (6 ft 8 in)	New York Knicks	(United States)
SG	8	Isaïa Cordinier	28 – 28 November 1996	1.97 m (6 ft 6 in)	Anadolu Efes	(Turkey)
PG	11	Théo Maledon	24 – 12 June 2001	1.93 m (6 ft 4 in)	Real Madrid	(Spain)
C	14	Mam Jaiteh	30 – 27 November 1994	2.08 m (6 ft 10 in)	Dubai Basketball	(United Arab Emirates)
SF	21	Zaccharie Risacher	20 – 8 April 2005	2.07 m (6 ft 9 in)	Atlanta Hawks	(United States)
F	34	Jaylen Hoard	26 – 30 March 1999	2.04 m (6 ft 8 in)	Maccabi Tel Aviv	(Israel)
PF	44	Alex Sarr	20 – 26 April 2005	2.13 m (7 ft 0 in)	Washington Wizards	(United States)
SG	99	Bilal Coulibaly	21 – 26 July 2004	2.03 m (6 ft 8 in)	Washington Wizards	(United States)

Head coach

- (France) Frédéric Fauthoux

Assistant coach(es)

- (France) Bryan George
- (France) Joseph Gomis
- (France) Laurent Vila

Legend

- (C) Team captain
- Club – describes last
  club before the tournament
- Age – describes age
  on 27 August 2025

=== Iceland ===
A 22-player roster was announced on 24 July. The final roster was announced on 19 August.

Iceland men's national basketball team – EuroBasket 2025 roster
Players
Coaches

Pos.	No.	Name	Age – Date of birth	Height	Club	Ctr.
PG	3	Ægir Steinarsson (C)	34 – 10 May 1991	1.82 m (6 ft 0 in)	Stjarnan	(Iceland)
PG	5	Hilmar Smári Henningsson	24 – 3 September 2000	1.92 m (6 ft 4 in)	Stjarnan	(Iceland)
PG	6	Jón Axel Guðmundsson	28 – 27 October 1996	1.96 m (6 ft 5 in)	Burgos	(Spain)
PG	10	Elvar Már Friðriksson	30 – 11 November 1994	1.83 m (6 ft 0 in)	KK Włocławek	(Poland)
PF	11	Almar Orri Atlason	20 – 28 December 2004	2.02 m (6 ft 8 in)	Bradley Braves	(United States)
PG	12	Kári Jónsson	28 – 27 August 1997	1.90 m (6 ft 3 in)	Valur	(Iceland)
G	14	Kristinn Pálsson	27 – 17 December 1997	1.97 m (6 ft 6 in)	Valur	(Iceland)
PG	15	Martin Hermannsson	30 – 16 September 1994	1.90 m (6 ft 3 in)	Alba Berlin	(Germany)
F	29	Orri Gunnarsson	22 – 21 August 2003	1.94 m (6 ft 4 in)	Stjarnan	(Iceland)
C	32	Tryggvi Hlinason	27 – 28 October 1997	2.15 m (7 ft 1 in)	Bilbao	(Spain)
PF	34	Styrmir Snær Þrastarson	24 – 2 August 2001	2.00 m (6 ft 7 in)	Mons-Hainaut	(Belgium)
PG	66	Sigtryggur Arnar Björnsson	32 – 7 March 1993	1.84 m (6 ft 0 in)	Tindastóll	(Iceland)

Head coach

- (Canada) (Denmark) Craig Pedersen

Assistant coach(es)

- (Iceland) Viðar Örn Hafsteinsson
- (Iceland) Baldur Þór Ragnarsson

Legend

- (C) Team captain
- Club – describes last
  club before the competition
- Age – describes age
  on 27 August 2025

=== Israel ===
A 20-player roster was announced on 23 June. It was reduced to 16 players on 1 August. The final roster was announced on 20 August.

Israel men's national basketball team – EuroBasket 2025 roster
Players
Coaches

Pos.	No.	Name	Age – Date of birth	Height	Club	Ctr.
G	3	Khadeen Carrington (N)	29 – 3 October 1995	1.93 m (6 ft 4 in)	Hapoel Jerusalem	(Israel)
C	6	Itay Segev	30 – 15 June 1995	2.06 m (6 ft 9 in)	Ironi Ness Ziona	(Israel)
G	8	Deni Avdija	24 – 3 January 2001	2.03 m (6 ft 8 in)	Portland Trail Blazers	(United States)
C	9	Roman Sorkin	29 – 11 August 1996	2.08 m (6 ft 10 in)	Maccabi Tel Aviv	(Israel)
PG	10	Bar Timor	33 – 2 March 1992	1.92 m (6 ft 4 in)	Hapoel Tel Aviv	(Israel)
G	11	Yam Madar	24 – 21 December 2000	1.90 m (6 ft 3 in)	Hapoel Tel Aviv	(Israel)
SF	12	Rafi Menco	31 – 5 March 1994	1.98 m (6 ft 6 in)	Maccabi Tel Aviv	(Israel)
PF	30	Nimrod Levi	30 – 24 March 1995	2.08 m (6 ft 10 in)	Hapoel Jerusalem	(Israel)
SG	35	Ethan Burg	22 – 4 September 2002	1.90 m (6 ft 3 in)	Tennessee Volunteers	(United States)
PF	41	Tomer Ginat (C)	30 – 7 November 1994	2.03 m (6 ft 8 in)	Hapoel Tel Aviv	(Israel)
SF	50	Yovel Zoosman	27 – 12 May 1998	1.99 m (6 ft 6 in)	Hapoel Jerusalem	(Israel)
G	99	Guy Palatin	24 – 25 September 2000	1.89 m (6 ft 2 in)	Hapoel Tel Aviv	(Israel)

Head coach

- (Israel) Ariel Beit-Halahmy

Assistant coach(es)

- (Israel) Guy Kaplan
- (Israel) Yoav Shamir

Legend

- (C) Team captain
- (N) Naturalised player
- Club – describes last
  club before the tournament
- Age – describes age
  on 27 August 2025

=== Poland ===
A 16-player roster was announced on 14 July. On 1 August, Jordan Loyd was added to the roster after being naturalized as a Polish citizen. Jeremy Sochan withdrew due to calf injury on 10 August. On 18 August, Igor Miličić Jr. withdrew due to knee injury. The final roster was announced on 22 August.

Poland men's national basketball team – EuroBasket 2025 roster
Players
Coaches

Pos.	No.	Name	Age – Date of birth	Height	Club	Ctr.
PG	0	Andrzej Pluta Jr.	25 – 3 June 2000	1.90 m (6 ft 3 in)	Legia Warsaw	(Poland)
C	2	Aleksander Balcerowski	24 – 19 November 2000	2.17 m (7 ft 1 in)	Unicaja Málaga	(Spain)
SF	3	Michał Sokołowski	32 – 11 December 1992	1.96 m (6 ft 5 in)	Dinamo Sassari	(Italy)
SG	8	Jordan Loyd (N)	32 – 27 July 1993	1.93 m (6 ft 4 in)	AS Monaco	(France)
SF	9	Mateusz Ponitka (C)	31 – 29 August 1993	1.98 m (6 ft 6 in)	Bahçeşehir Koleji	(Turkey)
C	10	Szymon Zapała	24 – 9 May 2001	2.13 m (7 ft 0 in)	Trefl Sopot	(Poland)
PF	11	Aleksander Dziewa	27 – 6 November 1997	2.07 m (6 ft 9 in)	Benfica	(Portugal)
PF	12	Tomasz Gielo	32 – 4 January 1993	2.05 m (6 ft 9 in)	King Szczecin	(Poland)
PG	15	Kamil Łączyński	36 – 17 April 1989	1.83 m (6 ft 0 in)	Arka Gdynia	(Poland)
C	17	Dominik Olejniczak	29 – 1 July 1996	2.13 m (7 ft 0 in)	Derthona	(Italy)
SG	23	Michał Michalak	31 – 2 November 1993	1.96 m (6 ft 5 in)	Włocławek	(Poland)
SF	28	Przemysław Żołnierewicz	30 – 3 July 1995	1.96 m (6 ft 5 in)	King Szczecin	(Poland)

Head coach

- (Croatia) (Poland) Igor Miličić

Assistant coach(es)

- (Poland) Artur Gronek
- (Poland) Marcin Wozniak

Legend

- (C) Team captain
- (N) Naturalised player
- Club – describes last
  club before the tournament
- Age – describes age
  on 27 August 2025

=== Slovenia ===
A 19-player roster was announced on 7 July. On 26 July, Vlatko Čančar withdrew to focus on recovering from knee surgery. Two days later, Josh Nebo withdrew due to injury and was replaced by Alen Omić. On 13 August, Zoran Dragić withdrew after a dispute with head coach Aleksander Sekulić. The final roster was announced on 21 August.

Slovenia men's national basketball team – EuroBasket 2025 roster
Players
Coaches

Pos.	No.	Name	Age – Date of birth	Height	Club	Ctr.
PF	2	Martin Krampelj	30 – 10 March 1995	2.06 m (6 ft 9 in)	Bilbao	(Spain)
PG	4	Mark Padjen	19 – 25 January 2006	1.98 m (6 ft 6 in)	Ilirija	(Slovenia)
PG	6	Aleksej Nikolić	30 – 21 February 1995	1.91 m (6 ft 3 in)	Cedevita Olimpija	(Slovenia)
SG	7	Klemen Prepelič	32 – 20 October 1992	1.91 m (6 ft 3 in)	Dubai Basketball	(United Arab Emirates)
F	8	Edo Murić	33 – 27 November 1991	2.02 m (6 ft 8 in)	Ilirija	(Slovenia)
F	12	Rok Radović	24 – 4 February 2001	2.01 m (6 ft 7 in)	Cedevita Olimpija	(Slovenia)
C	13	Robert Jurković	23 – 14 June 2002	2.07 m (6 ft 9 in)	Ilirija	(Slovenia)
SF	15	Gregor Hrovat	31 – 18 August 1994	1.96 m (6 ft 5 in)	JDA Dijon	(France)
F	23	Luka Ščuka	23 – 23 May 2002	2.09 m (6 ft 10 in)	Löwen Braunschweig	(Germany)
C	24	Alen Omić (N)	33 – 6 May 1992	2.16 m (7 ft 1 in)	KK Budućnost	(Montenegro)
SG	37	Leon Stergar	25 – 17 March 2000	1.93 m (6 ft 4 in)	Limoges CSP	(France)
SG	77	Luka Dončić (C)	26 – 28 February 1999	2.01 m (6 ft 7 in)	Los Angeles Lakers	(United States)

Head coach

- (Slovenia) Aleksander Sekulić

Assistant coach(es)

- (Slovenia) Luka Bassin
- (Slovenia) Dejan Mihevc
- (Slovenia) Domen Zevnik

Legend

- (C) Team captain
- (N) Naturalised player
- Club – describes last
  club before the tournament
- Age – describes age
  on 27 August 2025
