= 2023–24 Galatasaray S.K. (men's basketball) season =

Galatasaray Ekmas
2023–24 season
- President: Dursun Özbek
- Head coach: Zvezdan Mitrović (until 31 January 2024); Yakup Sekizkök (from 2 February 2024)
- Arena: Sinan Erdem Dome
- Basketbol Süper Ligi: 5th seed
- Playoffs: Quarterfinals
- Basketball Champions League: Round of 16
- Turkish Basketball Cup: Quarterfinals

The 2023–24 season is Galatasaray's 112th season in the existence of the club. The team plays in the Basketball Super League and in the Basketball Champions League.

== Overview ==
=== July ===
On 4 July, Galatasaray Nef will continue its European adventure in the FIBA Basketball Champions League this season. The regular season grouping of 32 teams will be determined in the draw, which will be held in Switzerland on July 5.

=== August ===
On 14 August, Galatasaray Nef pre-season preparation program has been announced.

On 23 August, The Fixture of the 2023–24 Season in the Basketbol Süper Ligi has been announced.

=== September ===
On 21 September, Cevat Soydaş Basketball Tournament Program Announced.

=== October ===
On 4 October, Ekmas Group will undertake the name and jersey sponsorship of Galatasaray Men's Basketball Team.

On 5 October, a sponsorship agreement was signed between Galatasaray and Ekmas Group. The men's basketball team of the yellow-red club will compete under the name "Galatasaray Ekmas" this season.

=== December ===
In the information made on 11 December 2023, it was announced that Jarell Martin, who was injured in the Pınar Karşıyaka fight, would be away from the fields for a long time.

=== January ===
On 30 January 2024, Galatasaray Ekmas lost 96–93 to the French representative JDA Dijon, which it hosted in the second match of Group J of the Champions League Round of 16. After the match, there was an argument between the yellow-red fans who wanted the resignation of Head Coach Zvezdan Mitrović and Mitrovic. Meanwhile, a controversy broke out when Mitrovic responded to the fans who reacted to him. Galatasaray staff took the experienced head coach to the dressing room.

On 31 January 2024, Galatasaray Ekmas announced that he had parted ways with head coach Zvezdan Mitrović, who had an argument with the fans in the JDA Dijon match.

== Players ==
=== Current roster ===
Note: Flags indicate national team eligibility at FIBA-sanctioned events. Players may hold other non-FIBA nationalities not displayed.

Galatasaray roster
Players
Coaches

Pos.	No.	Nat.	Name	Ht.	Wt.	Age
PF	1	(United States)	Martin, Jarell (injured)	2.08 m (6 ft 10 in)	108 kg (238 lb)	32 – 24 May 1994
PG	2	(United States) (Serbia)	Walden, Corey	1.88 m (6 ft 2 in)	86 kg (190 lb)	33 – 5 August 1992
PF	3	(Turkey)	Efeoğlu, Karahan Tuan	2.03 m (6 ft 8 in)		22 – 13 June 2004
PF	4	(Turkey)	İsmailçebi, Berke	2.04 m (6 ft 8 in)		22 – 7 June 2004
G	5	(Turkey) (Germany)	Akpınar, İsmet	1.92 m (6 ft 4 in)	77 kg (170 lb)	31 – 22 May 1995
PF	6	(Turkey)	Kabaca, Sadık Emir	2.08 m (6 ft 10 in)	95 kg (209 lb)	25 – 3 December 2000
F/C	7	(Bosnia and Herzegovina)	Halilović, Miralem	2.07 m (6 ft 9 in)	91 kg (201 lb)	34 – 22 July 1991
PG	8	(Bulgaria) (United States)	Bost, Dee	1.88 m (6 ft 2 in)	80 kg (176 lb)	36 – 12 October 1989
PF	9	(Turkey)	Geyik, Samet	2.06 m (6 ft 9 in)	98 kg (216 lb)	33 – 12 January 1993
SG	10	(Slovenia)	Prepelič, Klemen	1.91 m (6 ft 3 in)	90 kg (198 lb)	33 – 20 October 1992
PF	14	(Turkey)	Vatan, Efe	2.07 m (6 ft 9 in)		22 – 13 April 2004
SF	15	(United Kingdom)	Yeboah, Akwasi	1.98 m (6 ft 6 in)	104 kg (229 lb)	29 – 15 June 1997
G	16	(Turkey)	Oralkan, Rafi Ömer			21 – 1 March 2005
G	17	(Turkey)	Erdem, Kerem			20 – 24 March 2006
G	19	(Turkey)	Tuncer, Buğrahan	1.93 m (6 ft 4 in)	90 kg (198 lb)	33 – 23 March 1993
C	33	(United States)	McCormack, David	2.08 m (6 ft 10 in)	113 kg (249 lb)	26 – 2 July 1999
G/F	61	(Turkey)	Köksal, Göksenin (C)	1.97 m (6 ft 6 in)	93 kg (205 lb)	35 – 8 January 1991

Head coach

- (Turkey) Yakup Sekizkök

Assistant coach(es)

- (Turkey) Gökhan Turan
- (Turkey) Cem Güven

Athletic trainer(s)

- (Turkey) Yasin Aydın

Physiotherapist(s)

- (Turkey) Ali Can Kaşlı
- (Turkey) Mümin Balcıoğulları

Team manager

- (Turkey) Ömer Yalçınkaya
- (Turkey) İbrahim Tilki

Legend

- (C) Team captain
- Injured

- Roster
Updated: March 15, 2024

=== Depth chart ===
Pos.	Starting 5	Bench 1	Bench 2	Bench 3	Inactive
C	David McCormack	Samet Geyik			Jarell Martin (injured)
PF	Sadık Emir Kabaca	Miralem Halilović	Karahan Tuan Efeoğlu	Berke İsmailçebi	Efe Vatan
SF	Akwasi Yeboah	Göksenin Köksal
SG	Klemen Prepelič	Buğrahan Tuncer		Rafi Ömer Oralkan
PG	Dee Bost	Corey Walden	İsmet Akpınar	Kerem Erdem

(colours: Turkish or homegrown players; foreign players)

=== Transactions ===
==== Players In ====
No.	Pos.	Nat.	Name	Age	Moving from		Type	Ends	Date	Source
19	G	(Turkey)	Buğrahan Tuncer	30	Anadolu Efes	(Turkey)	End of contract	June 2025	24 June 2023	
5	G	(Turkey)	İsmet Akpınar	28	Fenerbahçe Beko	(Turkey)	End of contract	June 2025	26 June 2023	
12	SG	(United States)	Jonah Radebaugh	26	Valencia Basket	(Spain)	End of contract	June 2024	3 July 2023	
7	F/C	(Bosnia and Herzegovina)	Miralem Halilović	31	Nanterre 92	(France)	End of contract	June 2024	4 July 2023	
9	PF	(Turkey)	Samet Geyik	30	Fenerbahçe Beko	(Turkey)	End of contract	June 2025	6 July 2023	
15	SF	(United Kingdom)	Akwasi Yeboah	26	Darüşşafaka	(Turkey)	End of contract	June 2025	7 July 2023	
2	PG	(United States)	Corey Walden	30	Bayern Munich	(Germany)	End of contract	June 2024	10 July 2023	
1	PF	(United States)	Jarell Martin	29	Maccabi Tel Aviv	(Israel)	End of contract	June 2024	20 July 2023	
8	PG	(Bulgaria)	Dee Bost	34	Metropolitans 92	(France)	Parted ways	June 2024	28 October 2023	
10	SG	(Slovenia)	Klemen Prepelič	31	Cedevita Olimpija	(Slovenia)	Transfer	June 2024	7 December 2023	
33	C	(United States)	David McCormack	24	Darüşşafaka Lassa	(Turkey)	Transfer	June 2024	8 December 2023	
3	PF	(Turkey)	Karahan Tuan Efeoğlu	19	Utah Utes	(United States)	Transfer	June 2025	28 February 2024	
13	PG	(United States)	Parker Jackson-Cartwright	28	New Zealand Breakers	(New Zealand)	Transfer	June 2025	15 March 2024	

==== Players Out ====
No.	Pos.	Nat.	Name	Age	Moving to		Type	Date	Source
14	C	(Serbia)	Dušan Ristić	27	Lenovo Tenerife	(Spain)	End of contract	4 June 2023	
31	G	(Canada)	Dylan Ennis	31	UCAM Murcia	(Spain)	End of contract	21 June 2023	
3	SG	(United States)	Tyrus McGee	32	SIG Strasbourg	(France)	End of contract	22 June 2023	
5	PG	(Turkey)	Sedat Ali Karagülle	24	TED Ankara Kolejliler	(Turkey)	End of contract	22 June 2023	
22	F	(United States)	Angelo Caloiaro	33	Osaka Evessa	(Japan)	End of contract	22 June 2023	
24	PG	(United States)	Fatts Russell	25	Manisa Büyükşehir Belediyespor	(Turkey)	End of contract	22 June 2023	
8	C	(Turkey)	Mahir Agva	27	Petkim Spor	(Turkey)	Contract termination	11 July 2023	
30	PG	(Turkey)	Ege Tan Yıldızoğlu	19	Pacific Tigers	(United States)	Mutual agreement	3 August 2023	
0	G/F	(Turkey)	Muhaymin Mustafa	24	Merkezefendi Belediyesi Denizli Basket	(Turkey)	Mutual agreement	6 December 2023	
12	SG	(United States)	Jonah Radebaugh	26	UCAM Murcia	(Spain)	Mutual agreement	23 February 2024	
13	PG	(United States)	Parker Jackson-Cartwright	28	New Zealand Breakers	(New Zealand)	Mutual agreement	5 April 2024	

== Club ==
=== Staff ===
As of 23 February 2024

Staff member	Position
Ömer Yalçınkaya	General Manager
İbrahim Tilki	Team Manager
Yakup Sekizkök	Head Coach
Gökhan Turan	Assistant Coach
Cem Güven	Assistant Coach
Cenk Alyüz	Statistician
Batuhan Aybars Aksu	Statistician
Yasin Aydın	Conditioner
Emir Akmanlı	Communication and Media Specialist
Sinan Üstündağ	Doctor
Mümin Balcıoğulları	Physiotherapist
Ali Can Kaşlı	Physiotherapist
Burak Kozan	Masseur
Adnan Güney	Material Manager
Yunus Ün	Foreign Relations Officer
Vahit Yılmaz	Transportation Manager

=== Staff changes ===
Change	Date	Staff member	Staff position	Ref.
Out	2 December 2023	(Turkey) Turgay Zeytingöz	General Manager	
In	2 December 2023	(Turkey) Ömer Yalçınkaya	General Manager	
Out	31 January 2024	(Montenegro) Zvezdan Mitrović	Head Coach	
Out	31 January 2024	(Montenegro) Nikola Birač	Assistant Coach	
In	2 February 2024	(Turkey) Yakup Sekizkök	Head Coach	
In	2 February 2024	(Turkey) Gökhan Turan	Assistant Coach	
In	2 February 2024	(Turkey) Batuhan Aybars Aksu	Statistician	

=== Uniform ===
Home	Away	Third

=== Sponsorship and kit manufacturers ===
- Supplier: Umbro
- Name sponsor: Ekmas
- Main sponsor: Ekmas
- Back sponsor: —
- Sleeve sponsor: —
- Lateral sponsor: Sintek
- Short sponsor: Bilyoner
- Socks sponsor: —

=== Sponsorship naming ===
- Galatasaray Nef (until 4 October 2023)
- Galatasaray Ekmas (from 5 October 2023)

== Pre-season and friendlies ==
=== Friendly match ===
30 August 2023 Friendly Match	Galatasaray Nef	80–72	Enisey	Antalya
17:00 TRT (UTC+3)
		Report 1 Report 2		Arena: Gloria Sports Arena

2 September 2023 Friendly Match	ONVO Büyükçekmece	80–90	Galatasaray Nef	Büyükçekmece, Istanbul
14:00 TRT (UTC+3)
		Report 1 Report 2		Arena: Gazanfer Bilge Spor Salonu

7 September 2023 International Igokea Basketball Tournament	Igokea	71–82	Galatasaray Nef	Bosnia and Herzegovina
21:00 TRT (UTC+3)
		Report 1 Report 2

8 September 2023 International Igokea Basketball Tournament	Galatasaray Nef	50–88	CSKA Moscow	Bosnia and Herzegovina
18:00 TRT (UTC+3)
		Report 1 Report 2

10 September 2023 International Igokea Basketball Tournament	Galatasaray Nef	99–89	Hapoel Jerusalem	Bosnia and Herzegovina
17:00 TRT (UTC+3)
		Report 1 Report 2

14 September 2023 Nirvana Basketball Weeks	Galatasaray Nef	64–90	Pınar Karşıyaka	Antalya
18:00 TRT (UTC+3)
		Report 1 Report 2		Arena: Cosmos Sport Center

16 September 2023 Nirvana Basketball Weeks	Galatasaray Nef	69–72	Beşiktaş Emlakjet	Antalya
15:00 TRT (UTC+3)
		Report 1 Report 2		Arena: Cosmos Sport Center

17 September 2023 Nirvana Basketball Weeks	Türk Telekom	89–72	Galatasaray Nef	Antalya
16:00 TRT (UTC+3)
		Report 1 Report 2		Arena: Cosmos Sport Center

21 September 2023 Cevat Soydaş Basketball Tournament	Galatasaray Nef	87–83	Bursaspor İnfo Yatırım	Bursa
16:30 TRT (UTC+3)
		Report 1 Report 2		Arena: Tofaş Nilüfer Spor Salonu

22 September 2023 Cevat Soydaş Basketball Tournament	Bahçeşehir Koleji	67–79	Galatasaray Nef	Bursa
16:30 TRT (UTC+3)
		Report 1 Report 2		Arena: Tofaş Nilüfer Spor Salonu

23 September 2023 Cevat Soydaş Basketball Tournament	Darüşşafaka Lassa	78–71	Galatasaray Nef	Bursa
18:00 TRT (UTC+3)
		Boxscore		Arena: Tofaş Nilüfer Spor Salonu

== Competitions ==
=== Overall ===
Competition	Started round	Final position / round	First match	Last match
Basketbol Süper Ligi	Round 1	5th	30 September 2023	4 May 2024
Basketbol Süper Ligi Playoffs	Quarterfinals	Quarterfinals	15 May 2024	19 May 2024
Basketball Champions League	Round 1	Round of 16	18 October 2023	20 March 2024
Turkish Basketball Cup	Quarterfinals	Quarterfinals	13 February 2024	13 February 2024

Source: Competitions

=== Overview ===
Competition	Record							
Competition	Pld	W	D	L	PF	PA	PD	Win %
Basketbol Süper Ligi	30	16	0	14	2,544	2,479	+65	53.33
Basketbol Süper Ligi Playoffs	3	1	0	2	265	282	−17	33.33
Basketball Champions League	14	7	0	7	1,288	1,284	+4	50.00
Turkish Basketball Cup	1	0	0	1	72	88	−16	0.00
Total	48	24	0	24	4,169	4,133	+36	50.00

Source: Competitions

=== Basketbol Süper Ligi ===
==== League table ====
Pos	Team	Pld	W	L	PF	PA	PD	Pts	Qualification or relegation
3	Beşiktaş Emlakjet	30	21	9	2462	2236	+226	51	Advance to playoffs
4	Pınar Karşıyaka	30	21	9	2691	2531	+160	51	Advance to playoffs
5	Galatasaray Ekmas	30	16	14	2544	2479	+65	46	Advance to playoffs
6	Manisa BB	30	16	14	2468	2514	−46	46	Advance to playoffs
7	Petkim Spor	30	15	15	2531	2471	+60	45	Advance to playoffs

Source: Basketbol Süper Ligi

==== Results summary ====
Overall						Home					Away				
Pld	W	L	PF	PA	PD	W	L	PF	PA	PD	W	L	PF	PA	PD
30	16	14	2544	2479	+65	6	9	1308	1276	+32	10	5	1236	1203	+33

Source: TBF.org.tr

==== Results by round ====
Round	1	2	3	4	5	6	7	8	9	10	11	12	13	14	15	16	17	18	19	20	21	22	23	24	25	26	27	28	29	30
Ground	A	H	A	H	A	H	A	H	A	H	A	H	H	A	H	H	A	H	A	H	A	H	A	H	A	H	A	A	H	A
Result	W	W	L	L	W	L	L	L	W	L	L	L	W	W	W	L	W	W	L	L	W	W	W	L	W	L	L	W	W	W
Position	2	2	4	6	6	7	10	10	9	11	11	13	13	10	7	12	8	7	8	8	8	7	6	5	5	6	7	6	6	5

Source: TBF.org.tr
A = Away; H = Home; W = Win; L = Loss

==== Matches ====
Win Loss

Note: All times are TRT (UTC+3) as listed by Turkish Basketball Federation.

30 September 2023 1	Yukatel Merkezefendi Basket	77–93	Galatasaray Nef	Denizli
13:00 TRT (UTC+3)	Scoring by quarter: 18–25, 22–21, 16–27, 21–20
	Pts: Oturu 20; Rebs: Oturu 8 Asts: Robinson 8 PIR: Oturu 22	Boxscore; Report	Pts: Kabaca, Radebaugh 14; Rebs: Yeboah 6 Asts: Walden 6 PIR: Radebaugh 18	Arena: Pamukkale University Arena; Referees: Özlem Yalman, Ahmet Tatlıcı, Kerem Yılmaz

8 October 2023 2	Galatasaray Ekmas	85–81	Manisa Büyükşehir Belediyespor	Ataköy, Istanbul
13:00 TRT (UTC+3)	Scoring by quarter: 12–20, 28–13, 18–23, 27–25
	Pts: Walden 15; Rebs: Halilović 12; Asts: Tuncer 7 PIR: Halilović 20	Boxscore; Report	Pts: Russell 22; Rebs: Russell, Terry 6 Asts: Russell 6 PIR: Russell 22	Arena: Sinan Erdem Dome; Referees: Mehmet Şahin, Göksun Öz, Berk Kurtulmuş

15 October 2023 3	Petkim Spor	76–74	Galatasaray Ekmas	Aliağa, İzmir
15:30 TRT (UTC+3)	Scoring by quarter: 22–16, 24–20, 16–17, 14–21
	Pts: Zoriks 15; Rebs: Agva 8 Asts: Zoriks 6 PIR: Zoriks 19	Boxscore; Report	Pts: Martin 18; Rebs: Martin 13; Asts: Tuncer 4 PIR: Martin 25	Arena: Enka Sport Hall; Referees: Yener Yılmaz, Can Mavisu, Umut Özgün Ergün

22 October 2023 4	Galatasaray Ekmas	62–74	Fenerbahçe Beko	Ataköy, Istanbul
20:30 TRT (UTC+3)	Scoring by quarter: 18–22, 17–16, 15–18, 12–18
	Pts: Kabaca 16; Rebs: Radebaugh 6 Asts: Walden 5 PIR: Kabaca 16	Boxscore; Report	Pts: Madar 15; Rebs: Hayes, Calathes 6 Asts: Calathes 6 PIR: Calathes 21	Arena: Sinan Erdem Dome; Referees: Emin Moğulkoç, Mehmet Karabilecen, Çağlar Özkan

29 October 2023 5	Anadolu Efes	76–95	Galatasaray Ekmas	Ataköy, Istanbul
20:30 TRT (UTC+3)	Scoring by quarter: 19–22, 16–23, 24–23, 17–27
	Pts: Jones 18; Rebs: Clyburn 8 Asts: Yılmaz 5 PIR: Yılmaz 23	Boxscore; Report	Pts: Tuncer 16; Rebs: Yeboah 7 Asts: Walden 7 PIR: Yeboah 21	Arena: Sinan Erdem Dome; Referees: Ali Serkan Emlek, Erhan Gürsel, Tolga Edis

5 November 2023 6	Galatasaray Ekmas	75–76	Türk Telekom	Ataköy, Istanbul
18:00 TRT (UTC+3)	Scoring by quarter: 19–23, 20–19, 20–20, 16–14
	Pts: Halilović, Kabaca 15; Rebs: Halilović 8 Asts: Bost 4 PIR: Halilović 21	Boxscore; Report	Pts: Wallace 22; Rebs: Saybir 7 Asts: Adams 5 PIR: Wallace 20	Arena: Sinan Erdem Dome; Referees: Zafer Yılmaz, Orhan Çağrı Hekimoğlu, Musa Kazım Çetin

11 November 2023 7	Darüşşafaka Lassa	75–72	Galatasaray Ekmas	Istanbul
15:30 TRT (UTC+3)	Scoring by quarter: 18–29, 28–9, 8–20, 21–14
	Pts: McCormack 16; Rebs: McCormack 11; Asts: Allman Jr. 6 PIR: McCormack 25	Boxscore; Report	Pts: Tuncer 12; Rebs: Bost 10; Asts: Bost 11; PIR: Bost 19	Arena: Ayhan Şahenk Sports Hall; Referees: Hüseyin Çelik, Batuhan Söylemezoğlu, İsmail Bindir

17 November 2023 8	Galatasaray Ekmas	80–82	Bursaspor İnfo Yatırım	Ataköy, Istanbul
19:00 TRT (UTC+3)	Scoring by quarter: 11–11, 24–19, 17–26, 28–26
	Pts: Kabaca, Walden 15; Rebs: Martin 7 Asts: Walden 4 PIR: Walden 18	Boxscore; Report	Pts: Floyd 23; Rebs: Brown 6 Asts: Michineau, Young 6 PIR: Floyd 26	Arena: Sinan Erdem Dome; Referees: Özlem Yalman, Ziya Özorhon, Mehmet Serdar Ünal

25 November 2023 9	ONVO Büyükçekmece	61–70	Galatasaray Ekmas	Büyükçekmece, Istanbul
15:30 TRT (UTC+3)	Scoring by quarter: 16–15, 12–9, 20–21, 13–25
	Pts: Reed 17; Rebs: Upson 9 Asts: Pérez 7 PIR: Upson 11	Boxscore; Report	Pts: four players 12; Rebs: Martin, Tuncer 7 Asts: Walden, Bost 4 PIR: Kabaca 17	Arena: Gazanfer Bilge Sports Hall; Referees: Mehmet Karabilecen, Alper Özgök, Fatih Güler

3 December 2023 10	Galatasaray Ekmas	77–87	Çağdaş Bodrumspor	Ataköy, Istanbul
20:30 TRT (UTC+3)	Scoring by quarter: 14–24, 12–11, 18–28, 33–22
	Pts: Tuncer 20; Rebs: Geyik 7 Asts: Walden 4 PIR: Tuncer 20	Boxscore; Report	Pts: Warren 28; Rebs: Alibegović 9 Asts: Warren 4 PIR: Warren 27	Arena: Sinan Erdem Dome; Referees: Alper Altuğ Köselerli, Can Mavisu, Yiğit Gönültaş

9 December 2023 11	Pınar Karşıyaka	98–76	Galatasaray Ekmas	İzmir
18:00 TRT (UTC+3)	Scoring by quarter: 22–24, 26–16, 25–19, 25–17
	Pts: Carey Jr., McCollum 17; Rebs: Carey Jr. 12; Asts: Sipahi 5 PIR: Carey Jr. 32	Boxscore; Report	Pts: Kabaca 18; Rebs: Yeboah 6 Asts: Kabaca 4 PIR: Radebaugh, Kabaca 17	Arena: Karşıyaka Arena; Referees: Emin Moğulkoç, Musa Kazım Çetin, Nazlı Çisil Güngör

17 December 2023 12	Galatasaray Ekmas	86–92	Bahçeşehir Koleji	Ataköy, Istanbul
15:30 TRT (UTC+3)	Scoring by quarter: 21–25, 32–18, 20–27, 13–22
	Pts: Prepelič 16; Rebs: Halilović 7 Asts: Prepelič 6 PIR: Kabaca 18	Boxscore; Report	Pts: Cavanaugh 29; Rebs: Boutsiele 10; Asts: Boutsiele 6 PIR: Boutsiele, Bouteille 26	Arena: Sinan Erdem Dome; Referees: Kerem Baki, Ziya Özorhon, Tolga Akkuşoğlu

24 December 2023 13	Galatasaray Ekmas	89–83	Beşiktaş Emlakjet	Ataköy, Istanbul
13:00 TRT (UTC+3)	Scoring by quarter: 29–23, 21–31, 14–14, 25–15
	Pts: McCormack 25; Rebs: Göksenin 6 Asts: Prepelič 12; PIR: McCormack 27	Boxscore; Report	Pts: Delgado, Mitchell 15; Rebs: Delgado, Mitchell 7 Asts: Needham 5 PIR: Delgado 13	Arena: Sinan Erdem Dome; Referees: Kaan Büyükçil, Ali Şakacı, Duhan Köyiçi

29 December 2023 14	Reeder Samsunspor	70–72	Galatasaray Ekmas	Samsun
18:00 TRT (UTC+3)	Scoring by quarter: 14–16, 16–17, 20–22, 20–17
	Pts: Henry 14; Rebs: Baş 8 Asts: Crawford 7 PIR: Baş 21	Boxscore; Report	Pts: McCormack 22; Rebs: McCormack 8 Asts: Walden 7 PIR: McCormack 23	Arena: Mustafa Dağıstanlı Sports Hall; Referees: Fatih Arslanoğlu, Sinem Tetik Akbayrak, Burak Yılmaz

6 January 2024 15	Galatasaray Ekmas	95–76	Tofaş	Ataköy, Istanbul
15:30 TRT (UTC+3)	Scoring by quarter: 24–21, 32–14, 18–22, 21–19
	Pts: Bost 26; Rebs: Radebaugh 7 Asts: Bost 7 PIR: Bost 32	Boxscore; Report	Pts: Wiley 16; Rebs: Wiley 9 Asts: Winston 5 PIR: Wiley 19	Arena: Sinan Erdem Dome; Referees: Ali Serkan Emlek, Mehmet Karabilecen, Berk Kurtulmuş

14 January 2024 16	Galatasaray Ekmas	87–102	Yukatel Merkezefendi Basket	Ataköy, Istanbul
15:30 TRT (UTC+3)	Scoring by quarter: 15–24, 23–26, 26–31, 23–21
	Pts: Prepelič, Yeboah 19; Rebs: McCormack 10; Asts: Bost 8 PIR: Yeboah 23	Boxscore; Report	Pts: Wright 36; Rebs: Wright, Badžim 6 Asts: Mason 12; PIR: Wright 38	Arena: Sinan Erdem Dome; Referees: Emin Moğulkoç, Alper Özgök, Fatih Güler

20 January 2024 17	Manisa Büyükşehir Belediyespor	80–83	Galatasaray Ekmas	Manisa
13:00 TRT (UTC+3)	Scoring by quarter: 17–19, 21–22, 22–21, 20–21
	Pts: Anderson 23; Rebs: Terry 16; Asts: Russell 12; PIR: Terry 35	Boxscore; Report	Pts: Tuncer 19; Rebs: Halilović 8 Asts: Prepelič 9 PIR: Halilović 24	Arena: Muradiye Sports Hall; Referees: Kaan Büyükçil, Ziya Özorhon, Nazlı Çisil Güngör

27 January 2024 18	Galatasaray Ekmas	90–88(OT)	Petkim Spor	Ataköy, Istanbul
13:00 TRT (UTC+3)	Scoring by quarter: 18–11, 23–30, 14–18, 22–18, Overtime: 13–11
	Pts: Halilović, Yeboah 15; Rebs: Bost 7 Asts: Bost, Prepelič 7 PIR: Halilović 20	Boxscore; Report	Pts: Efianayi 20; Rebs: Aldridge 12; Asts: Zoriks 6 PIR: Zoriks, Simmons 16	Arena: Sinan Erdem Dome; Referees: Özlem Yalman, Kerem Baki, Mehmet Serdar Ünal

4 February 2024 19	Fenerbahçe Beko	90–74	Galatasaray Ekmas	Istanbul
20:30 TRT (UTC+3)	Scoring by quarter: 16–19, 26–16, 19–15, 29–24
	Pts: Motley 15; Rebs: Calathes 10; Asts: Calathes 12; PIR: Calathes 22	Boxscore; Report	Pts: Yeboah 16; Rebs: McCormack 8 Asts: Tuncer 7 PIR: Tuncer 18	Arena: Ülker Sports and Event Hall; Referees: Mehmet Karabilecen, Ahmet Tatlıcı, Murat Ciner

11 February 2024 20	Galatasaray Ekmas	92–95	Anadolu Efes	Ataköy, Istanbul
13:00 TRT (UTC+3)	Scoring by quarter: 18–28, 23–20, 25–26, 26–21
	Pts: Prepelič 29; Rebs: Kabaca 7 Asts: Tuncer 6 PIR: Prepelič 29	Boxscore; Report	Pts: Pleiß 22; Rebs: Bryant 14; Asts: Thompson 12; PIR: Bryant 27	Arena: Sinan Erdem Dome; Referees: Ali Şakacı, Seher Ayşe Nur Yazıcıoğlu, Yiğit Gönültaş

2 March 2024 21	Türk Telekom	90–92	Galatasaray Ekmas	Ankara
15:30 TRT (UTC+3)	Scoring by quarter: 30–21, 19–30, 16–19, 25–22
	Pts: Wallace 27; Rebs: Enoch 7 Asts: Ulusoy 7 PIR: Saybir, Wallace 19	Boxscore; Report	Pts: Prepelič 23; Rebs: McCormack 12; Asts: Tuncer 10; PIR: McCormack 30	Arena: Ankara Arena; Referees: Mehmet Şahin, Alper Altuğ Köselerli, Nazlı Çisil Güngör

9 March 2024 22	Galatasaray Ekmas	95–78	Darüşşafaka Lassa	Ataköy, Istanbul
20:30 TRT (UTC+3)	Scoring by quarter: 20–17, 25–19, 25–19, 25–23
	Pts: Bost 17; Rebs: McCormack 13; Asts: three players 5 PIR: Kabaca 26	Boxscore; Report	Pts: Demir 15; Rebs: Carlton 7 Asts: Adams, Abdur-Rahkman 4 PIR: Taşkıran, Carlton 15	Arena: Sinan Erdem Dome; Referees: Yener Yılmaz, Duhan Köyiçi, Musa Kazım Çetin

17 March 2024 23	Bursaspor İnfo Yatırım	65–81	Galatasaray Ekmas	Bursa
15:30 TRT (UTC+3)	Scoring by quarter: 17–21, 14–22, 17–20, 17–18
	Pts: Mutaf, Young 12; Rebs: Hamilton 9 Asts: Brown, Young 4 PIR: Hamilton 16	Boxscore; Report	Pts: Bost 22; Rebs: McCormack 11; Asts: Akpınar 4 PIR: Bost 21	Arena: Tofaş Nilüfer Sports Hall; Referees: Kerem Baki, Ali Şakacı, Erhan Gürsel

24 March 2024 24	Galatasaray Ekmas	96–101(OT)	ONVO Büyükçekmece	Ataköy, Istanbul
18:00 TRT (UTC+3)	Scoring by quarter: 27–18, 17–25, 21–24, 20–18, Overtime: 11–16
	Pts: Bost 28; Rebs: McCormack 9 Asts: Prepelič 9 PIR: Bost 33	Boxscore; Report	Pts: Reed 27; Rebs: Bruinsma 9 Asts: Pérez 8 PIR: Franke 23	Arena: Sinan Erdem Dome; Referees: Mehmet Şahin, Mehmet Serdar Ünal, Polat Parlak

29 March 2024 25	Çağdaş Bodrumspor	77–81	Galatasaray Ekmas	Muğla
18:00 TRT (UTC+3)	Scoring by quarter: 19–22, 21–19, 16–25, 21–15
	Pts: Alibegović 22; Rebs: Moore 9 Asts: Warren 9 PIR: Düverioğlu 18	Boxscore; Report	Pts: Kabaca, Prepelič 19; Rebs: McCormack 15; Asts: Bost, Prepelič 7 PIR: McCormack 28	Arena: Bodrum Sports Hall; Referees: Can Mavisu, Ziya Özorhon, Burak Yılmaz

6 April 2024 26	Galatasaray Ekmas	86–92	Pınar Karşıyaka	Ataköy, Istanbul
15:30 TRT (UTC+3)	Scoring by quarter: 20–23, 19–24, 26–18, 21–27
	Pts: Bost 21; Rebs: Kabaca 8 Asts: Bost, Prepelič 6 PIR: Bost 25	Boxscore; Report	Pts: McCollum 22; Rebs: Brown 8 Asts: Sipahi 12; PIR: McCollum 27	Arena: Sinan Erdem Dome; Referees: Emin Moğulkoç, Zafer Yılmaz, Tolga Edis

13 April 2024 27	Bahçeşehir Koleji	90–89	Galatasaray Ekmas	Istanbul
18:00 TRT (UTC+3)	Scoring by quarter: 27–25, 13–20, 26–33, 24–11
	Pts: Cavanaugh 26; Rebs: Arna 9 Asts: Kell, Taylor 6 PIR: Cavanaugh 30	Boxscore; Report	Pts: Prepelič 21; Rebs: Köksal 6 Asts: Bost 12; PIR: Prepelič 22	Arena: Ülker Sports and Event Hall; Referees: Özlem Yalman, Kaan Büyükçil, Çağlar Özkan

22 April 2024 28	Beşiktaş Emlakjet	76–77	Galatasaray Ekmas	Istanbul
20:30 TRT (UTC+3)	Scoring by quarter: 21–19, 14–21, 15–20, 26–17
	Pts: Allman 16; Rebs: Delgado 13; Asts: Needham 7 PIR: Delgado 21	Boxscore; Report	Pts: Bost 18; Rebs: Halilović 7 Asts: Akpınar, Bost 4 PIR: Bost 18	Arena: Akatlar Arena; Referees: Yener Yılmaz, Semih Vural, Seher Ayşe Nur Yazıcıoğlu

26 April 2024 29	Galatasaray Ekmas	113–69	Reeder Samsunspor	Ataköy, Istanbul
18:00 TRT (UTC+3)	Scoring by quarter: 23–28, 23–11, 40–15, 27–15
	Pts: Yeboah 15; Rebs: Halilović 8 Asts: Tuncer 8 PIR: three players 21	Boxscore; Report	Pts: Şenli 14; Rebs: Satır 10; Asts: Satır 10; PIR: Satır 19	Arena: Sinan Erdem Dome; Referees: Fatih Arslanoğlu, Erhan Gürsel, Kerem Yılmaz

4 May 2024 30	Tofaş	102–107(OT)	Galatasaray Ekmas	Bursa
15:30 TRT (UTC+3)	Scoring by quarter: 21–29, 26–24, 21–22, 29–22, Overtime: 5–10
	Pts: Denmon, O'Brien 19; Rebs: Homesley 8 Asts: Geçim, Winston 6 PIR: O'Brien 24	Boxscore; Report	Pts: Tuncer 26; Rebs: McCormack 9 Asts: three players 6 PIR: Tuncer 29	Arena: Tofaş Nilüfer Sports Hall; Referees: Zafer Yılmaz, Hüseyin Çelik, Tolga Akkuşoğlu

==== Playoffs ====
===== Quarterfinals =====
Win Loss

15 May 2024 1	Pınar Karşıyaka	95–96(OT) (Series: 0–1)	Galatasaray Ekmas	İzmir
20:30 TRT (UTC+3)	Scoring by quarter: 19–20, 24–26, 26–16, 13–20, Overtime: 13–14
	Pts: McCollum 23; Rebs: McCollum 11; Asts: McCollum 8 PIR: McCollum 27	Boxscore; Report	Pts: Bost 21; Rebs: Bost 11; Asts: Tuncer 10; PIR: Bost 24	Arena: Karşıyaka Arena; Referees: Kerem Baki, Mehmet Serdar Ünal, Nazıl Çisil Güngör

17 May 2024 2	Galatasaray Ekmas	87–90 (Series: 1–1)	Pınar Karşıyaka	Ataköy, Istanbul
20:30 TRT (UTC+3)	Scoring by quarter: 22–25, 27–17, 15–20, 23–28
	Pts: Tuncer 15; Rebs: Bost 7 Asts: Bost 7 PIR: McCormack, Tuncer 17	Boxscore; Report	Pts: Martin 31; Rebs: Sipahi 9 Asts: Sipahi 6 PIR: Martin 28	Arena: Sinan Erdem Dome; Referees: Can Mavisu, Alper Altuğ Köselerli, Duhan Köyiçi

19 May 2024 3	Pınar Karşıyaka	97–82 (Series: 2–1)	Galatasaray Ekmas	İzmir
20:30 TRT (UTC+3)	Scoring by quarter: 25–12, 25–23, 25–24, 22–23
	Pts: McCollum 28; Rebs: Haltalı 10; Asts: Sipahi 6 PIR: McCollum 28	Boxscore; Report	Pts: Kabaca 19; Rebs: McCormack 6 Asts: Bost 5 PIR: Tuncer 18	Arena: Karşıyaka Arena; Referees: Yener Yılmaz, Mehmet Şahin, Kaan Büyükçil

=== Basketball Champions League ===
==== Regular season ====
Pos	Team	Pld	W	L	PF	PA	PD	Pts	Qualification	JER	PAO	GAL	BEN
1	(Israel) Hapoel Jerusalem	6	5	1	513	440	+73	11	Advance to round of 16	—	71–61	99–96	97–68
2	(Greece) PAOK	6	3	3	455	478	−23	9	Advance to play-ins	79–77	—	79–85	76–74
3	(Turkey) Galatasaray Ekmas	6	3	3	513	492	+21	9	Advance to play-ins	70–85	77–88	—	98–78
4	(Portugal) Benfica	6	1	5	443	514	−71	7		66–84	94–72	63–87	—

Source: Groups standings

==== Regular Season Matches ====
Win Loss

18 October 2023 RS1	Galatasaray Ekmas (Turkey)	77–88	(Greece) PAOK	Ataköy, Istanbul, Turkey
19:00 TRT (UTC+3)	Scoring by quarter: 19–30, 23–22, 17–19, 18–17
	Pts: Martin 18; Rebs: Martin 4 Asts: Walden, Tuncer 4 PIR: Martin, Walden 16	Boxscore; Report	Pts: Harrison 21; Rebs: Friðriksson 11; Asts: Friðriksson 10; PIR: Friðriksson 27	Arena: Sinan Erdem Dome; Referees: Manuel Mazzoni (ITA), Saverio Lanzarini (ITA), Peter Praksch (HUN)

1 November 2023 RS2	Hapoel Jerusalem (Israel)	99–96(OT)	(Turkey) Galatasaray Ekmas	Belgrade, Serbia
18:00	Scoring by quarter: 24–16, 11–24, 23–20, 25–23, Overtime: 16–13
	Pts: Carrington 27; Rebs: Hankins 8 Asts: Smith 6 PIR: Carrington 24	Boxscore; Report	Pts: Yeboah 27; Rebs: Halilović 11; Asts: Akpınar, Walden 5 PIR: Yeboah 27	Arena: Aleksandar Nikolić Hall; Referees: Yohan Rosso (FRA), Mārtiņš Kozlovskis (LVA), Lorenzo Baldini (ITA)

14 November 2023 RS3	Galatasaray Ekmas (Turkey)	98–78	(Portugal) Benfica	Ataköy, Istanbul, Turkey
20:00 TRT (UTC+3)	Scoring by quarter: 11–20, 31–19, 27–19, 29–20
	Pts: Akpınar 22; Rebs: Kabaca 7 Asts: Köksal 6 PIR: Akpınar 26	Boxscore; Report	Pts: Almeida 16; Rebs: Romdhane 7 Asts: Barbosa, Romdhane 4 PIR: three players 13	Arena: Sinan Erdem Dome; Referees: Ademir Zurapovic (BIH), Fernando Calatrava (SPA), Marek Kukelcik (SVK)

30 November 2023 RS4	Galatasaray Ekmas (Turkey)	70–85	(Israel) Hapoel Jerusalem	Laktaši, Bosnia and Herzegovina
21:30 TRT (UTC+3)	Scoring by quarter: 17–22, 13–23, 17–18, 23–22
	Pts: Akpınar 18; Rebs: Kabaca 5 Asts: Kabaca 4 PIR: Akpınar 16	Boxscore; Report	Pts: Carrington, Randolph 17; Rebs: Ndour 6 Asts: Randolph 5 PIR: Randolph 20	Arena: Laktaši Sports Hall; Referees: Antonio Conde (SPA), Manuel Mazzoni (ITA), Gatis Salins (LVA)

13 December 2023 RS5	Benfica (Portugal)	63–87	(Turkey) Galatasaray Ekmas	Lisbon, Portugal
22:30 TRT (UTC+3)	Scoring by quarter: 16–13, 18–18, 19–30, 10–26
	Pts: Vilhena 16; Rebs: Ben Romdhane 7 Asts: Barbosa, Almeida 3 PIR: Carter 18	Boxscore; Report	Pts: McCormack 19; Rebs: McCormack 10; Asts: three players 6 PIR: McCormack 26	Arena: Pavilhão Fidelidade; Referees: Boris Krejic (SVN), Georgios Poursanidis (GRE), Peter Praksch (HUN)

20 December 2023 RS6	PAOK (Greece)	79–85	(Turkey) Galatasaray Ekmas	Pylaia, Thessaloniki, Greece
20:30 TRT (UTC+3)	Scoring by quarter: 22–30, 22–19, 20–27, 15–9
	Pts: Smith 16; Rebs: Beliauskas, Smith 6 Asts: Smith, Tsairelis; PIR: Smith 17	Boxscore; Report	Pts: Yeboah 26; Rebs: McCormack, Yeboah 7 Asts: Prepelič 10; PIR: Yeboah 29	Arena: P.A.O.K. Sports Arena; Referees: Antonio Conde (SPA), Gvidas Gedvilas (LTU), Ivor Matejek (CZE)

==== Play-ins ====
Win Loss

3 January 2024 1	Basket Derthona (Italy)	70–71 (Series: 0–1)	(Turkey) Galatasaray Ekmas	Tortona, Alessandria, Italy
22:30 TRT (UTC+3)	Scoring by quarter: 22–20, 11–17, 17–12, 20–22
	Pts: Baldasso 16; Rebs: Weems 8 Asts: Ross 7 PIR: Baldasso 17	Boxscore; Report	Pts: Prepelič 23; Rebs: McCormack 12; Asts: Bost 7 PIR: McCormack 23	Arena: PalaFerraris; Referees: Mārtiņš Kozlovskis (LVA), Marius Ciulin (ROU), Ventsislav Velikov (BUL)

9 January 2024 2	Galatasaray Ekmas (Turkey)	95–89 (Series: 2–0)	(Italy) Basket Derthona	Ataköy, Istanbul, Turkey
20:00 TRT (UTC+3)	Scoring by quarter: 26–14, 20–20, 26–22, 23–33
	Pts: Prepelič 23; Rebs: Halilović 8 Asts: Prepelič 12; PIR: Prepelič 25	Boxscore; Report	Pts: Ross 21; Rebs: three players 5 Asts: Baldasso 6 PIR: Ross 19	Arena: Sinan Erdem Dome; Referees: Yohan Rosso (France), Fernando Calatrava (Spain), Carsten Straube (Germany)

==== Round of 16 ====
Pos	Team	Pld	W	L	PF	PA	PD	Pts	Qualification	BON	LUD	DIJ	GAL
1	(Germany) Telekom Baskets Bonn	6	5	1	500	466	+34	11	Advance to quarter-finals	—	80–75	89–74	89–76
2	(Germany) MHP Riesen Ludwigsburg	6	3	3	507	479	+28	9	Advance to quarter-finals	81–85	—	71–59	100–80
3	(France) JDA Dijon	6	2	4	458	490	−32	8		62–72	82–89	—	85–76
4	(Turkey) Galatasaray Ekmas	6	2	4	516	546	−30	8		95–85	93–91	93–96	—

Source: Round of 16 Standings

==== Round of 16 Matches ====
Win Loss

23 January 2024 R16-1	Telekom Baskets Bonn (Germany)	89–76	(Turkey) Galatasaray Ekmas	Bonn, Germany
22:00 TRT (UTC+3)	Scoring by quarter: 24–25, 23–14, 15–17, 27–20
	Pts: Watson 23; Rebs: Kennedy 8 Asts: Frey 6 PIR: Griesel 28	Boxscore; Report	Pts: Walden, Yeboah 15; Rebs: Halilović 8 Asts: Prepelič 6 PIR: Walden 16	Arena: Telekom Dome; Referees: Antonio Conde (SPA), Luis Castillo (SPA), Paulo Marques (POR)

30 January 2024 R16-2	Galatasaray Ekmas (Turkey)	93–96	(France) JDA Dijon	Ataköy, Istanbul, Turkey
20:00 TRT (UTC+3)	Scoring by quarter: 38–24, 22–20, 23–19, 10–33
	Pts: McCormack 21; Rebs: four players 4 Asts: Prepelič 8 PIR: McCormack 26	Boxscore; Report	Pts: Hammonds 20; Rebs: Dokossi 13; Asts: Holston 9 PIR: Dokossi 28	Arena: Sinan Erdem Dome; Referees: Gatis Salins (LVA), Marius Ciulin (ROU), Péter Praksch (HUN)

6 February 2024 R16-3	MHP Riesen Ludwigsburg (Germany)	100–80	(Turkey) Galatasaray Ekmas	Ludwigsburg, Germany
22:00 TRT (UTC+3)	Scoring by quarter: 30–17, 22–25, 28–25, 20–13
	Pts: Graves 23; Rebs: Edigin 9 Asts: Buie, Bartolo 4 PIR: Graves	Boxscore; Report	Pts: McCormack 14; Rebs: McCormack 9 Asts: Tuncer 8 PIR: McCormack 20	Arena: Arena Ludwigsburg; Referees: Nicolas Maestre (FRA), Dariusz Zapolski (POL), Gintaras Maciulis (LTU)

5 March 2024 R16-4	Galatasaray Ekmas (Turkey)	98–85	(Germany) Telekom Baskets Bonn	Ataköy, Istanbul, Turkey
20:00 TRT (UTC+3)	Scoring by quarter: 28–23, 22–20, 22–13, 26–29
	Pts: Prepelič 20; Rebs: McCormack 8 Asts: Tuncer 8 PIR: McCormack 23	Boxscore; Report	Pts: Watson 19; Rebs: Kennedy 8 Asts: Watson 5 PIR: Watson 20	Arena: Sinan Erdem Dome; Referees: Manuel Mazzoni (ITA), Fernando Calatrava (SPA), Beniamino Manuel Attard (ITA)

12 March 2024 R16-5	Galatasaray Ekmas (Turkey)	93–91	(Germany) MHP Riesen Ludwigsburg	Ataköy, Istanbul, Turkey
20:00 TRT (UTC+3)	Scoring by quarter: 28–18, 26–24, 24–23, 15–26
	Pts: Kabaca 15; Rebs: Halilović 11; Asts: Prepelič 5 PIR: Halilović 22	Boxscore; Report	Pts: Graves 26; Rebs: Melson 7 Asts: Graves 5 PIR: Graves 27	Arena: Sinan Erdem Dome; Referees: Antonio Conde (SPA), Saverio Lanzarini (ITA), Luis Castillo (SPA)

20 March 2024 R16-6	JDA Dijon (France)	85–76	(Turkey) Galatasaray Ekmas	Dijon, France
22:00 TRT (UTC+3)	Scoring by quarter: 18–14, 27–16, 19–23, 21–23
	Pts: Dokossi 16; Rebs: Dokossi 18; Asts: Hunt 7 PIR: Dokossi 31	Boxscore; Report	Pts: Prepelič 16; Rebs: Halilović 6 Asts: Prepelič 8 PIR: Walden 13	Arena: Palais des Sports de Dijon; Referees: Martins Kozlovskis (Latvia), Michal Proc (Poland), Dariusz Zapolski (Poland)

=== Turkish Basketball Cup ===
==== Quarterfinals ====
Win Loss

13 February 2024 QF	Pınar Karşıyaka	88–72	Galatasaray Ekmas	Karşıyaka, İzmir
20:30 TRT (UTC+3)	Scoring by quarter: 23–14, 22–23, 29–19, 14–16
TRT Spor	Pts: V.Brown 25; Rebs: Carey 12; Asts: McCollum 8 PIR: Carey 28	Boxscore; Report	Pts: Prepelič 19; Rebs: Geyik 8 Asts: Prepelič 7 PIR: Prepelič 17	Arena: Karşıyaka Arena; Referees: Can Mavisu, Ziya Özorhon, Batuhan Söylemezoğlu

== Statistics ==
=== Head coaches records ===
Head coach	Competition	G	W	L	PF	PA	PD	Win %
Zvezdan Mitrović	Basketbol Süper Ligi	18	9	9	1461	1454	+7	.500
Zvezdan Mitrović	Basketball Champions League	10	5	5	941	923	+18	.556
Zvezdan Mitrović	Total	28	14	14	2402	2377	+25	.500
Yakup Sekizkök	Basketbol Süper Ligi	12	7	5	1083	1025	+58	.583
Yakup Sekizkök	Basketbol Süper Ligi Playoffs	3	1	2	265	282	–17	.333
Yakup Sekizkök	Basketball Champions League	4	2	2	347	361	–14	.500
Yakup Sekizkök	Turkish Basketball Cup	1	0	1	72	88	–16	.000
Yakup Sekizkök	Total	20	10	10	1767	1756	+11	.500
