= CSM Oradea (men's basketball) =

Basketball team in Bihor County, Romania

- Leagues: Liga Națională; Europe Cup
- Founded: 2003; 23 years ago
- History: CSM Oradea (2003–present)
- Arena: Oradea Arena
- Capacity: 5,200
- Location: Oradea, Romania
- Team colors: Red, Blue, White
- President: Şerban Sere
- Head coach: Mikko Riipinen
- Championships: 3 Romanian Leagues
- Website: csmoradea.ro
Home	Away

CSM Oradea, also known as simply Oradea, is a Romanian professional basketball club, based in Oradea. The club competes in the Liga Națională, the highest level of basketball in Romania.

== History ==
CSM Oradea was founded in 2003, and the team was promoted to the first division in 2005. The club's best results came in 2012, when it reached the Romanian Cup semi-finals, and in 2013, when it finished in third place.

In the 2012–13 season, the team finished in second place at the end of the regular season, with 23 wins and 7 losses, and qualified for the playoffs. In the first round, the team lost the series 3–1 against "U" Mobitelco Cluj-Napoca, and the team then lost 3–1 against eventual champions Asesoft Ploieşti. In the third-place series, the team defeated Gaz Metan Mediaş 2–1.

In the 2013–14 season the team made its first European appearance, as they would play in the third tier EuroChallenge. It also made the Cup Final for the first time, as well as the Liga Nationala Final.

In the 2015–16 season, Oradea won its first Romanian national championship, after beating BC Mureș in the Finals. Following their historic achievement, Oradea played in the Basketball Champions League during the 2016–17 season and one year later, achieved their second league title.

== Honours ==
- Liga Națională

Champions (3): 2016, 2018, 2019
Runners-up (6): 2014, 2021, 2023, 2024, 2025, 2026
3rd Place (3): 2013, 2017, 2022

- Romanian Cup

Runners-up (7): 2014, 2016, 2018, 2019, 2020, 2021, 2023, 2025,2026

- Romanian Supercup

Champions (1): (2019)

- FIBA Europe Cup

3rd Place (1): 2021

== Current roster ==
Note: Flags indicate national team eligibility at FIBA-sanctioned events. Players may hold other non-FIBA nationalities not displayed.

CSM Oradea roster
Players
Coaches

Pos.	No.	Nat.	Name	Ht.	Age
G	0	(United States) (Romania)	Richard, Kris	1.96 m (6 ft 5 in)	37 – 1 March 1989
G	4	(United States)	Jefferson, Josh	1.88 m (6 ft 2 in)	28 – 26 July 1998
G/F	5	(Romania)	Fometescu, Tudor	1.92 m (6 ft 4 in)	27 – 9 March 1999
F/C	6	(Canada)	Guerrier, Quincy	2.01 m (6 ft 7 in)	27 – 13 May 1999
SF	8	(Romania)	Topai, Andrei	1.91 m (6 ft 3 in)	17 – 17 November 2008
F/C	10	(United States)	Osborne, Malik	2.06 m (6 ft 9 in)	28 – 9 April 1998
G	11	(United States)	Nichols, David	1.83 m (6 ft 0 in)	30 – 26 March 1996
PF	12	(Romania)	Blaj-Voinescu, George	2.03 m (6 ft 8 in)	26 – 19 February 2000
F	13	(United States)	Hume, Bodie	1.98 m (6 ft 6 in)	27 – 21 September 1999
F	14	(Romania)	Török, Rolland	2.02 m (6 ft 8 in)	35 – 25 October 1990
SG	23	(Romania)	Năstruț, Luca	1.93 m (6 ft 4 in)	23 – 10 August 2003
C	30	(United Kingdom)	Akin, Dan	2.06 m (6 ft 9 in)	28 – 16 June 1998
F	35	(Romania)	Schmidt, Marian	2.06 m (6 ft 9 in)	22 – 14 August 2004

Head coach

- (Sweden) Mikko Riipinen

Assistant coach(es)

- (Romania) Ciprian Enache
- (Romania) David Karsai

Legend

- (C) Team captain
- Injured

- Roster
Updated: September 10, 2026

== Notable players ==
Note: Flags indicate national team eligibility at FIBA-sanctioned events. Players may hold other non-FIBA nationalities not displayed.

Criteria

To appear in this section a player must have either:

- Set a club record or won an individual award while at the club
- Played at least one official international match for their national team at any time
- Played at least one official NBA match at any time.

- (Romania) Rares Apostol
- (Romania) Mihai Gavrilă
- (Romania) László Lázár
- (Romania) Bogdan Țîbîrnă
- (Australia) Daniel Dillon
- (Slovenia) Miha Zupan
- (Serbia) Uroš Lučić
- (United States) Sean Barnette
- (United States) T. J. Carter
- (United States) Martin Zeno
