= Mikko Riipinen =

Swedish-Finnish basketball coach (born 1987)

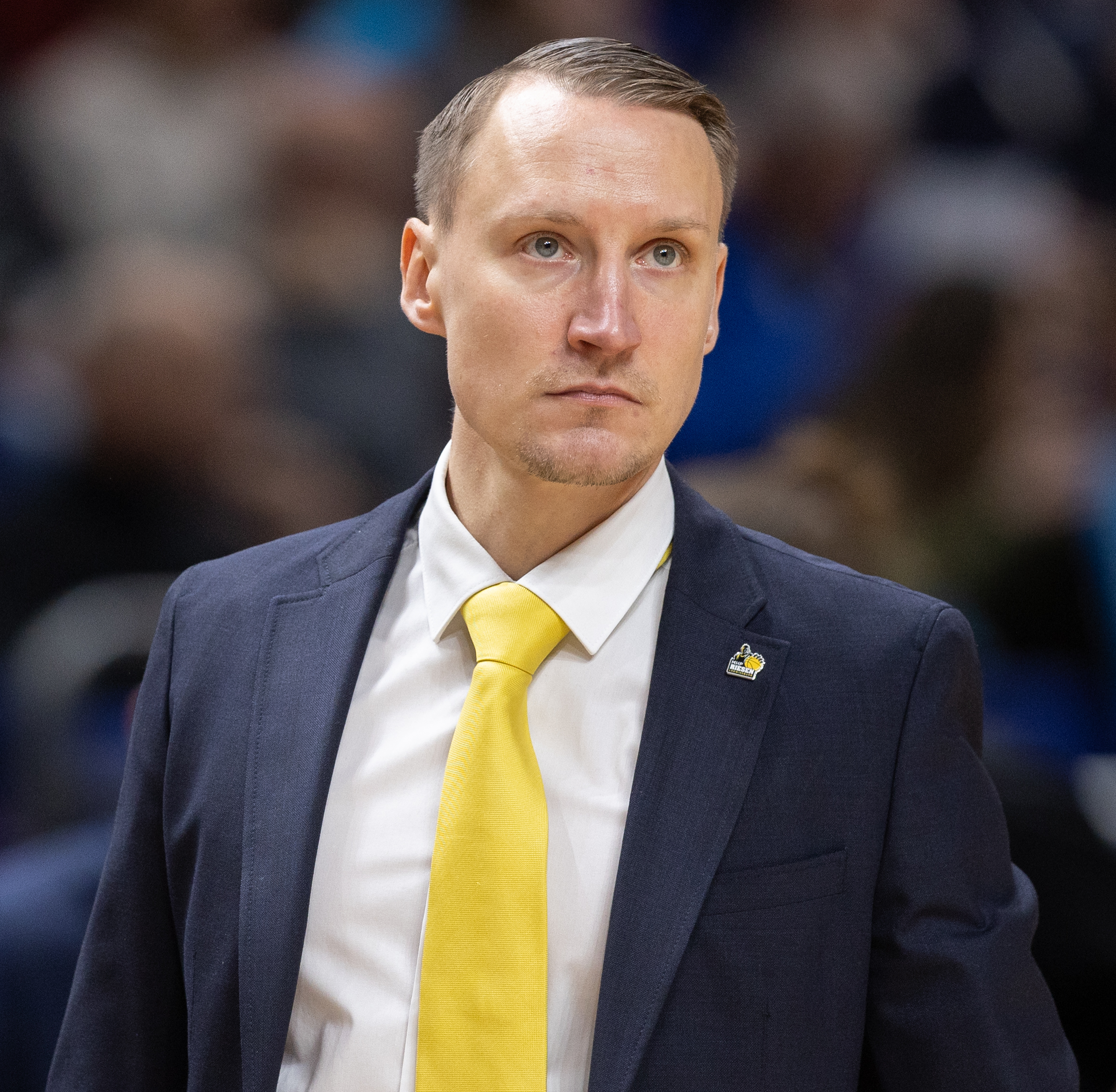
- Riipinen coaching Riesen Ludwigsburg in 2025

CSM Oradea
- Position: Head coach
- League: Liga Națională

Personal information
- Born: 18 August 1987 (age 39) Drammen, Norway
- Listed height: 1.77 m (5 ft 10 in)

Career information
- Playing career: 2003–2012
- Coaching career: 2015–present

Career history

Playing
- 2003–2012: Norrköping Dolphins

Coaching
- 2015–2019: Norrköping Dolphins B
- 2017–2019: Norrköping Dolphins (assistant)
- 2019–2025: Norrköping Dolphins
- 2021–present: Sweden
- 2025: BG Göttingen
- 2025–2026: Riesen Ludwigsburg
- 2026–present: CSM Oradea

Career highlights
- As head coach: 4x Swedish League champion (2021–2024); 2x Swedish Cup winner (2023, 2024)

Mikko Kari Johannes Riipinen (born 18 August 1987) is a Swedish–Finnish basketball coach and a former player. He is currently working as the head coach of CSM Oradea and the Sweden national team.

== Early life ==
Riipinen was born in Norway to Finnish parents, a mother from Turku and father from Kuopio. At the age of one, he moved to Norrköping, Sweden, with his mother where his grandmother was living.

== Career ==
Riipinen played basketball as a point guard for his hometown club Norrköping Dolphins between 2003 and 2012.

After retiring as a player, he started his coaching career with the Dolphins in the club's B team in 2015. During 2019–2025, he served as the head coach of the club's first team in Swedish Basketball League (SBL). He led the team to win four consecutive Swedish championships between 2021 and 2024. They also won two Swedish Basketball Cups in 2023 and 2024.

In 2021, he started coaching the Sweden men's national basketball team. They qualified for the EuroBasket 2025 final tournament, after a twelve-year absence. Riipinen coached the team to advance from the group phase and to reach the round of 16.

On 15 January 2025, he was named head coach of BG Göttingen in the Basketball Bundesliga.

He joined German Bundesliga team Riesen Ludwigsburg for the 2025–26 season. Under his guidance, Ludwigsburg won 18 of its 37 games. At the conclusion of the 2025–26 campaign the Bundesliga side activated a clause within the contract to end the agreement. In June 2026, Riipinen was appointed head coach of Romanian side CSM Oradea.

== Personal life ==
Though being raised in Sweden, Riipinen visited Finland frequently while growing up to meet his paternal grandparents and spoke Finnish with them. He holds a dual citizenship. He acquired the Swedish passport when aged 16, when he was selected to play for the Sweden U16 national team.
