= Dan Akin =

British basketball player

- Akin with Strasbourg in 2023

No. 30 – CSM Oradea
- Position: Center / power forward
- League: Liga Națională

Personal information
- Born: 16 June 1998 (age 28) Eltham, England
- Listed height: 6 ft 9 in (2.06 m)
- Listed weight: 225 lb (102 kg)

Career information
- High school: Barking Abbey (London Borough of Barking and Dagenham)
- College: UMBC (2017–2021); California Baptist (2021–2022); Utah State (2022–2023)
- NBA draft: 2023: undrafted
- Playing career: 2023–present

Career history
- 2023–2024: SIG Strasbourg
- 2024–2025: Scafati Basket
- 2025–2026: Kolossos Rodou
- 2026–present: CSM Oradea

Career highlights
- Mountain West Sixth Man of the Year (2023)

Daniel "Dan" Akin (pronounced Ah-kin born 16 June 1998) is a British professional basketball player who plays for Liga Națională club CSM Oradea.

== Early life ==
Akin had been active in several different sports as he competed internationally in team handball and was ranked third in England in the high jump. His fascination with basketball grew when he watched it at the 2012 London Olympics. He also hit a growth spurt and a physical education teacher made sure he found his way to the basketball court.

== High School and college career ==
Akin played as a student for the Northfleet Basketball Academy under head coach Martin Parry. He left the academy in 2016.

Later, he won the British Division 1 men's title and Elite Academy Basketball League (EABL) final's MVP with Barking Abbey.

From Barking Abbey, alongside RJ Eytle-Rock, Akin was recruited by Ryan Odom, who was then the UMBC Retrievers head coach.

He was part of the team that became the first 16-seed to defeat a 1-seed in the men's tournament by defeating Virginia 74–54. Akin was an integral part of the 2020–21 UMBC Retrievers team as they chased down a 14–6 record, going 10–4 in the America East and earning a share of the regular-season crown. Yet, as top seed, UMBC fell 79–77 to sixth-seed UMass Lowell on 6 March in the tournament semi-finals. As of early March 2021, Akin averaged 7.9 points and 6.4 rebounds and shot 58 percent from the field, playing a key role inside.

Akin later moved on to his postgraduate programme at California Baptist University. As of March 2022, he led the California Baptist Lancers in both points and rebounds at 12.9 points and 8.3 rebounds per contest in the Western Athletic Conference. He further led all European players in the NCAA for true shooting percentage.

Akin was able to play an additional NCAA year because of the COVID pandemic.

== Professional career ==
For the 2023–24 season, he signed his first professional contract with SIG Strasbourg.

On 22 June 2024, he signed with Darüşşafaka of the Basketbol Süper Ligi (BSL).

On 4 September 2024, he signed with Scafati Basket of the Lega Basket Serie A (LBA).

On 7 July 2025, he signed with Kolossos Rodou of the Greek Basketball League (GBL).

On 29 June 2026, Akin signed with Romanian club CSM Oradea for the 2026–27 season.

== National team career ==
He represented the England's national under-18 team and Great Britain's national under-18 team.

== Playing style ==
Ryan Odom (Akin's UMBC coach) describes him as "… the best athlete on the team. He’s a great rebounder, a guy that really gets your attention inside when he catches the ball. If you don’t get bodies around him he has the quickness to get right around you. Defensively, he’s really versatile. He can guard one through five.”
