= Northfleet Technology College =

Location
- Colyer Road; Northfleet, Kent, DA11 8BG; England; 51°25′59″N 0°20′35″E

Information
- Type: Foundation school
- Motto: Going Beyond
- Established: 2010 (The Modern School Building) 1936 (Northfleet School for Boys)
- Local authority: Kent
- Department for Education URN: 118928 Tables
- Ofsted: Reports
- Headteacher: Steven Gallears
- Gender: Boys
- Age: 11 to 18
- Houses: Helios , Thor , Hercules , Poseidon , Ikenga
- Colours: Orange & Grey
- Website: http://www.ntc.kent.sch.uk/

Northfleet Technology College (formerly Northfleet School for Boys) is located in Northfleet, Kent. It is an all-boys school that offers secondary education for students aged 11+.

As part of the Building Schools for the Future programme, a new school building was opened in 2010, with state of the art vocational learning areas.

== Description ==
Northfleet Technology College is a non-selective boys 11-18 secondary school of approaching 1000 pupils in Gravesend, Kent. This is a non-selective secondary school in an area where 23% students are selected for grammar school places. It has specialist technology status in 2012. It is located in a new building that was opened in 2010. Sixth form provision is made in partnership with other schools under the umbrella of the Gravesham 14−19 consortium. The proportions of students who receive support at school action plus, or who have a statement of educational needs, is well above average. The proportion of students known to be eligible for support through the pupil premium grant (additional government funding for students in local authority care or receiving free school meals) is above the national average. Most students are from White British backgrounds, in a multi-cultural area. The school identify the most able pupils as soon as they start at the school and teachers monitor the progress of these pupils regularly. Teachers expect all of the most able pupils to tackle challenging work, these pupils make rapid progress. Leaders are successfully promoting the value of humanities and languages with pupils and parents.

== Northfleet Basketball Academy ==
Northfleet Basketball Academy was started in 2009 by Northfleet Technology College to recruit elite basketball players from the South East of England. The academy is based at Northfleet Technology College. The team is an official Medway Park Crusaders Basketball Academy who play in the British Colleges Elite Basketball Competition.

== Northfleet Football Academy ==
Northfleet Football Academy was started in 2009 by Northfleet Technology College. It also offers its participants the opportunity to take a BTEC in Sports and one other additional subject like Science to help the players gain nationally recognised qualifications at key stage 4 whilst the players develop their playing skills.
