= Northfleet Basketball Academy =

Northfleet Technology College Basketball Academy
- League: U19 College Basketball League (CBL)
- Established: 2009
- History: Northfleet Technology College Basketball Academy (2009-present)
- Arena: Northfleet Technology College
- Location: Northfleet, Kent
- Team colours: Black and orange
- Ownership: Northfleet Technology College
- Website: http://www.ntc.kent.sch.uk
Home	Away

Northfleet Technology College Basketball Academy was started in 2009 by Northfleet Technology College to recruit elite basketball players from the South East of England. The academy is based at Northfleet Technology College, Colyer Road, Northfleet, Kent, DA11 8BG, England. The team is an official Kent Crusaders Basketball Academy who play in the CBL, the EYBL and U17 & U19 England Basketball Schools competition.

== Kit ==
Northfleet Technology College Basketball Academy athletes are equipped with Nike tracksuits, bags, training tees and Medway Park Crusaders kits and shooting shirts each with their own number and name.

== Home court ==
Northfleet Technology College Basketball Academy play in the state-of-the-art basketball gym at Northfleet Technology College which was opened in 2010, facilitating plexi backboards, flexi rims and a spring-loaded floor.

== Players ==
Player	Position	Age	National League Team
Tyrone Bonsu	Guard	U18 & D3	Northfleet Crusaders & CBL
Vilius Nikonorovas	Guard	U18 & D3	Northfleet Crusaders & CBl
Pieter Tuitel	Guard	U18	Northfleet Crusaders & CBL
Johan Castro Lopez	Guard	U18	Northfleet Crusaders & CBL
Harrison King	Forward	U18 & D3	Northfleet Crusaders & CBL
Joel Onojighofia	Forward	U18 & D3	Northfleet Crusaders & CBL
David Okaeben	Forward	U18	Northfleet Crusaders & CBL

== Former Players ==
Player	Position	Age	National League Team
James McCartney	Forward	U19	Kent Crusaders & South East England
Dwight London	Guard	U19	Kent Crusaders
Sam Bignell	Guard	U19	Kent Crusaders & South East England

== Coaches ==
Head Coach & Director of Basketball: Martin Parry

Associate Head Coach: Rob Newson

Assistant Coach: Sam Lane

== 2014-15 Fixtures ==
Opponents	Date	Home or Away
SEEVIC	17/09/14	H
Copleston	24/9/14	A
Itchen College	1/10/14	H
Canterbury	8/10/14	H
SGS	15/10/14	H
Harris Academy	5/11/14	A
Barking Abbey	19/11/14	A
Oaklands College	3/12/14	H
EHWLC	10/12/14	A
City College Plymouth	7/1/15	A
SEEVIC	14/1/15	A
The Henley College	21/1/15	H
Copleston	4/2/15	H
Hackney CC	11/2/15	A
The Harefield Academy	25/2/15	H
Canterbury	4/3/15	A
BHASVIC	11/3/15	A
Harris Academy	18/3/15	H

== Team Honours ==
Honours	Season
England Schools Basketball South East England Champions	2010-11
U19 Last 8 England Schools Basketball Competition	2010-11
Promotion to the Elite Academies Basketball League	2010-11
U17 Last 8 England Schools Basketball Competition	2013-14
U17 Kent Champions	2013-14
