= Swedish Basketball Cup =

Swedish Cup
- Founded: 2019; 7 years ago
- First season: 2019–20
- Country: Sweden
- Confederation: FIBA Europe
- Number of teams: 25
- Related competitions: Swedish Basketball League
- Website: www.basketsverige.se

The Swedish Basketball Cup (Swedish: Svenska Cupen) is an annual cup competition for Swedish basketball teams organized by the Swedish Basketball Federation. A total of 25 teams participate, with teams from the Swedish Basketball League (SBL) as well as from lower leagues.

For the 2019–20 season, the Swedish Cup was re-launched after the tournament was gone since the 1990s.
