= Sadık Emir Kabaca =

Turkish basketball player (born 2000)

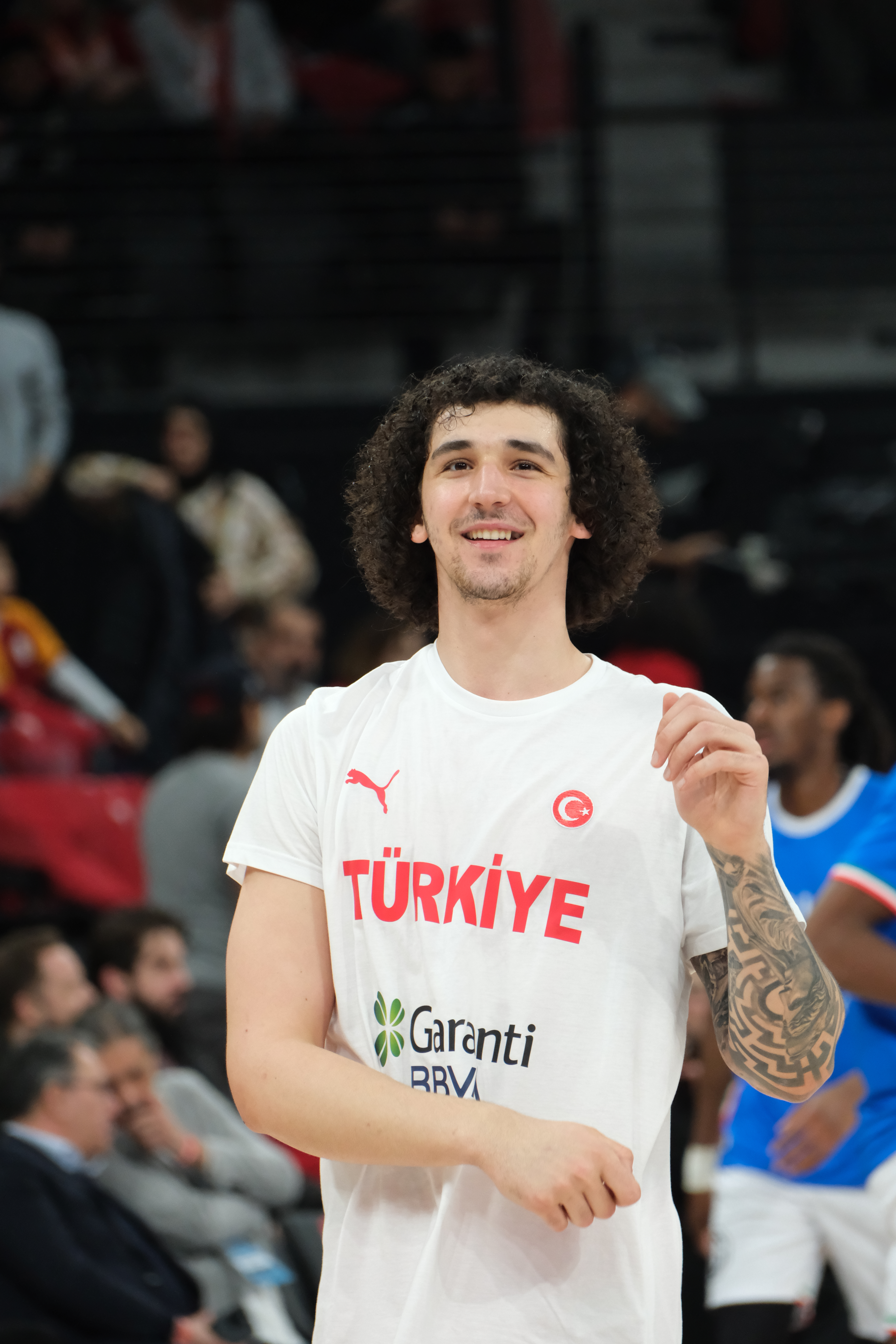
- Kabaca with the Turkey national team in 2025

No. 11 – Tofaş
- Position: Power forward
- League: Basketbol Süper Ligi

Personal information
- Born: December 13, 2000 (age 25) İzmir, Turkey
- Listed height: 6 ft 11 in (2.11 m)
- Listed weight: 215 lb (98 kg)

Career information
- Playing career: 2016–present

Career history
- 2016–2019: Bandırma Kırmızı
- 2019–2020: Teksüt Bandırma
- 2020–2021: Beşiktaş Icrypex
- 2021–2025: Galatasaray Nef
- 2025–2026: Casademont Zaragoza
- 2026–present: Tofaş Bursa

Career highlights
- Champions League Best Young Player (2023)

Sadık Emir Kabaca (born December 13, 2000) is a Turkish professional basketball player who plays for Tofaş Bursa of the Turkish Basketbol Süper Ligi. He plays as a power forward.

== Professional career ==
=== Years in Bandırma (2016–2020) ===
Sadık Emir Kabaca started his professional career at Bandırma Kırmızı in 2016–17 season and stayed with this club three seasons.

=== Beşiktaş (2020–2021) ===
On August 8, 2020, he has signed with Beşiktaş Icrypex of the Basketbol Süper Ligi (BSL).

=== Galatasaray (2021–2025) ===
On August 23, 2021, he has signed with BSL club Galatasaray Nef.

On June 17, 2025, Galatasaray Club published a farewell message for Kabaca and announced that they had parted ways.

=== Basket Zaragoza (2025–2026) ===
On July 6, 2025, he signed with Casademont Zaragoza of the Spanish Liga ACB.

=== Tofaş (2026–present) ===
In February 2026, he signed for Tofaş Bursa of the Turkish Basketbol Süper Ligi.
