= Akwasi Yeboah =

British basketball player

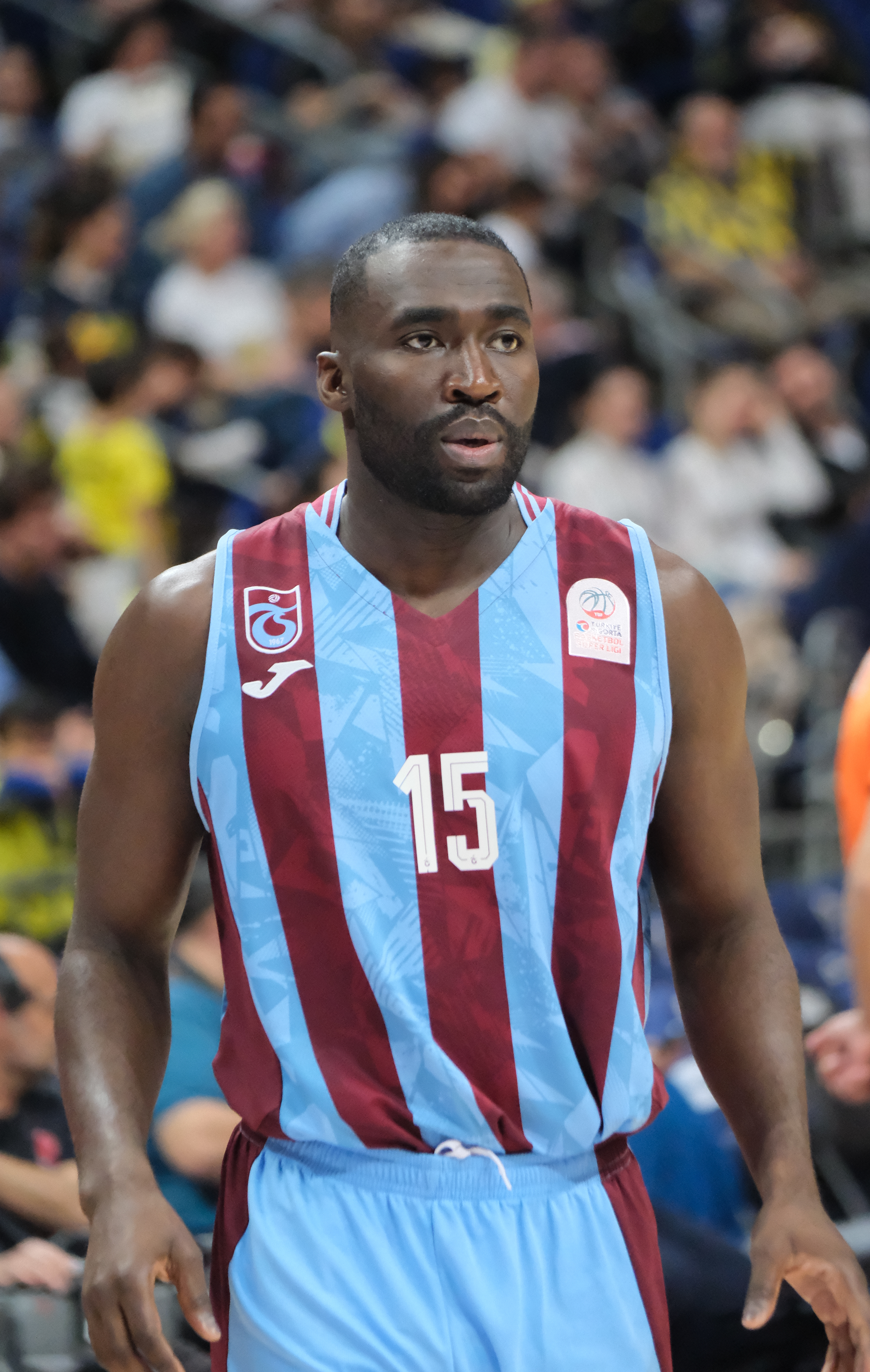
- Yeboah with Trabzonspor in 2026

No. 15 – Trabzonspor
- Position: Small forward / power forward
- League: Basketbol Süper Ligi; FIBA Champions League

Personal information
- Born: 15 June 1997 (age 29) Sekondi-Takoradi, Ghana
- Listed height: 6 ft 6 in (1.98 m)
- Listed weight: 230 lb (104 kg)

Career information
- High school: Barking Abbey School (London, England)
- College: Stony Brook (2016–2019); Rutgers (2019–2020)
- NBA draft: 2020: undrafted
- Playing career: 2014–present

Career history
- 2014–2015: Kent Crusaders
- 2020–2021: Saint-Quentin
- 2021–2022: Saint-Chamond Basket
- 2022–2023: Darüşşafaka
- 2023–2024: Galatasaray
- 2024–2025: Trapani Shark
- 2025–present: Trabzonspor

Career highlights
- First-team All-America East (2019); Second-team All-America East (2018)

Akwasi Abeyie Yeboah (born 15 June 1997) is a British professional basketball player for Trabzonspor of the Turkish Basketbol Süper Ligi (BSL) and the FIBA Champions League. Yeboah competed for the Kent Crusaders of the English National Basketball League (NBL) and led the team to a championship in 2015. Yeboah played three seasons of college basketball for the Stony Brook Seawolves before transferring to play for the Rutgers Scarlet Knights as a graduate student for his final season of eligibility.

== Early life and career ==
Yeboah was born in Sekondi-Takoradi, Ghana but moved to the London suburb of Chigwell, England at the age of nine after his mother Winifred found a nursing job to better provide for him and older brother Kwame. Yeboah started out as a soccer player and did not begin playing basketball until the age of 13. He was, by his admission, terrible at basketball at first. His physical education teacher told him that he was not competitive, which motivated him to improve.

He competed for the Kent Crusaders of the English National Basketball League (NBL) after the Barking Abbey School, which he attended, partnered with the Crusaders to give their top players the ability to play in the NBL. He had a season-high 21 points twice, against the Bradford Dragons and Essex Leopards, and scored 19 points in a 12-point comeback win against the Reading Rockets. Yeboah was a key piece of the team that won the 2015 NBL Division I Playoff Championship. He averaged 12.7 points and 5.4 rebounds per game. In the league final, Yeboah scored 21 points and had seven rebounds. He received his only NCAA Division I offer from Stony Brook's head coach Steve Pikiell.

== College career ==
=== Stony Brook (2016–2019) ===
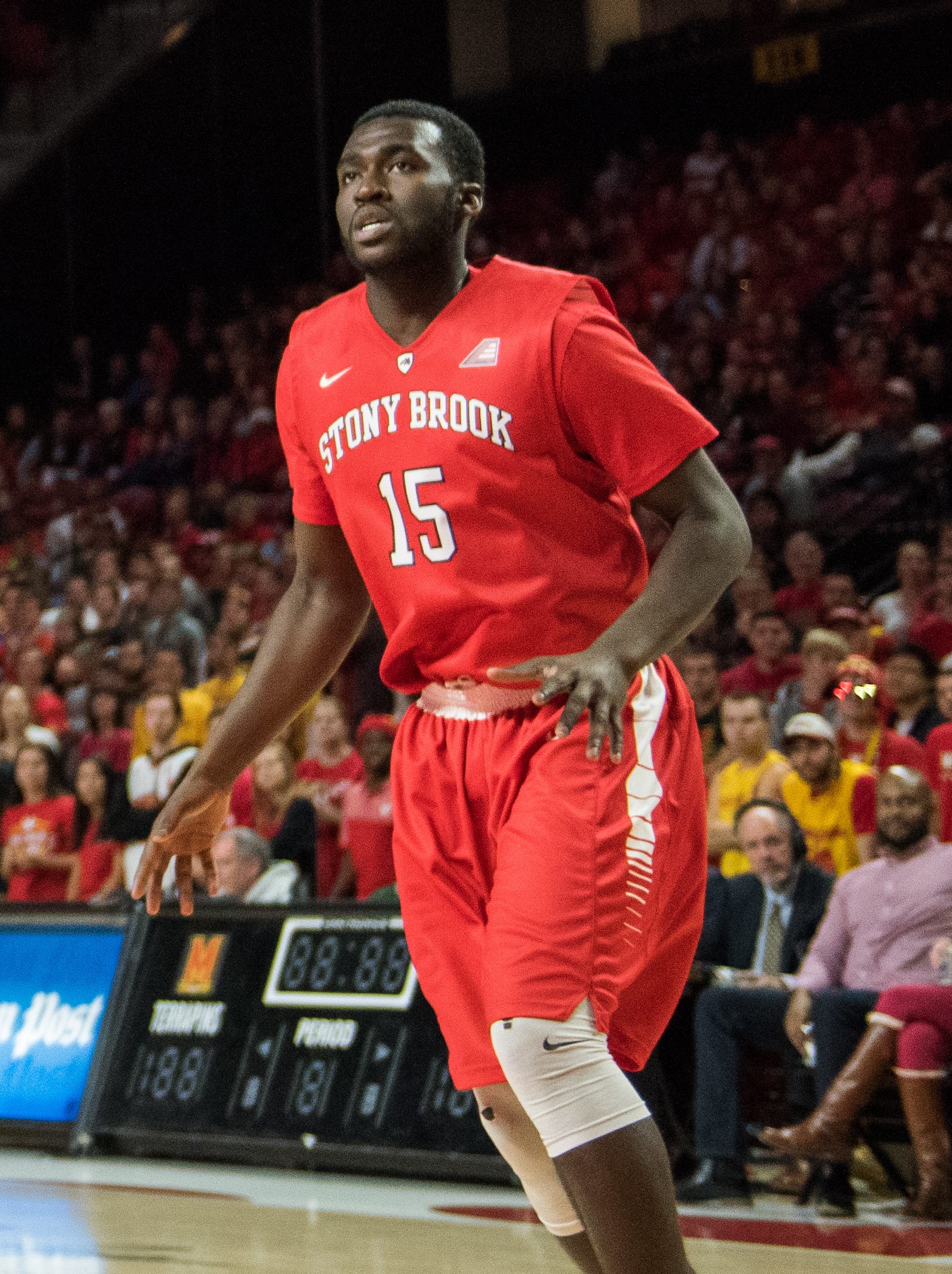
Yeboah playing for Stony Brook in 2016

Yeboah redshirted his first season at Stony Brook, which was Pikiell's last at the school before accepting the job at Rutgers. Stony Brook made the NCAA Tournament for the first time in school history as Yeboah sat out the season due to lack of projected playing time. As a redshirt freshman, Yeboah averaged 9.5 points and 5.1 rebounds per game and was named to the America East All-Freshman Team. He scored 21 points and had 16 rebounds in the first round of the America East Tournament in a 70–60 win against Binghamton.

In his sophomore season, Yeboah averaged 15.3 points and 5.1 rebounds per game. He had nine 20-point games as a sophomore and was named to the Second Team All-America East. He scored a career-high 30 points to go with eight rebounds against Columbia on 7 December 2017.

Yeboah averaged 20.4 points through the first 12 games of his junior season. On 22 December 2018, against Quinnipiac, Yeboah suffered a hyperextended knee but returned to the lineup after missing a game. Yeboah averaged 16.7 points and 7.7 rebounds per game as a junior for the Seawolves while shooting 41.3 percent from the floor and 31.6 percent from three-point range. He was named to the First Team All-America East.

In three seasons at Stony Brook, Yeboah scored 1,317 points, the sixth-most in program history.

=== Rutgers (2019–2020) ===
Yeboah entered the transfer portal in March 2019 as an impending graduate student, but retained his eligibility at Stony Brook for the 2019–20 season. He was listed as the 36th-best graduate transfer according to Stadium's Jeff Goodman.

On 2 May 2019, Yeboah announced that he would transfer to Rutgers, reuniting with his former head coach Steve Pikiell and choosing the Scarlet Knights over SMU and TCU. He was eligible immediately as a graduate transfer. Pikiell called Yeboah "a huge addition to our program," and he was a key piece in helping Rutgers have one of the best homecourt records and its first winning season since 2006. Yeboah scored 20 points, including a three-pointer to tie the game at 72 with two minutes to play, in a 75–72 win against Nebraska on 26 January 2020, and surpassed the 1,500-point milestone. In his senior season, Yeboah averaged 9.8 points and 4.8 rebounds per game and earned the Big Ten Sportsmanship Award.

== Professional career ==
On 12 August 2020, Yeboah signed his first professional contract with Saint-Quentin of the French LNB Pro B. He averaged 12.0 points, 3.8 rebounds, 1.3 assists, and 1.0 steal per game. On 3 August 2021, Yeboah signed with Saint-Chamond Basket.

On 19 June 2022, he has signed with Darüşşafaka of the Turkish Basketbol Süper Ligi (BSL).

On 7 July 2023, he signed with Galatasaray Ekmas of the Basketball Super League (BSL).

On 23 July 2024, he signed with Trapani Shark of the Lega Basket Serie A.

On 7 July 2025, he signed with Trabzonspor of the Basketbol Süper Ligi (BSL).

== National team career ==
Yeboah competed for Great Britain on its U16, U18 and U20 teams. In the 2017 FIBA U20 European Championship Division B, he averaged 14.3 points, 4.7 rebounds, and 0.9 assists per game. Yeboah scored 22 points and collected 6 rebounds in the third-place game, an 81–65 win against Russia, and was named to the All-Star Five.

== Career statistics ==
Legend
GP	Games played	GS	Games started	MPG	Minutes per game
FG%	Field goal percentage	3P%	3-point field goal percentage	FT%	Free throw percentage
RPG	Rebounds per game	APG	Assists per game	SPG	Steals per game
BPG	Blocks per game	PPG	Points per game	**Bold**	Career high

=== College ===
Year	Team	GP	GS	MPG	FG%	3P%	FT%	RPG	APG	SPG	BPG	PPG
2015–16	Stony Brook	Redshirt										
2016–17	Stony Brook	31	10	21.2	.372	.341	.797	5.1	.6	.5	**.5**	9.5
2017–18	Stony Brook	**32**	**31**	28.5	**.452**	**.355**	**.803**	5.1	**1.4**	**.9**	.2	15.3
2018–19	Stony Brook	**32**	**31**	**31.8**	.413	.316	.785	**7.7**	**1.4**	**.9**	**.5**	**16.7**
2019–20	Rutgers	31	22	23.8	.435	.352	.781	4.8	.9	.8	**.5**	9.8
Career		126	94	26.4	.419	.338	.792	5.7	1.1	.7	.4	12.9
