= Yakup Sekizkök =

Turkish basketball player and coach

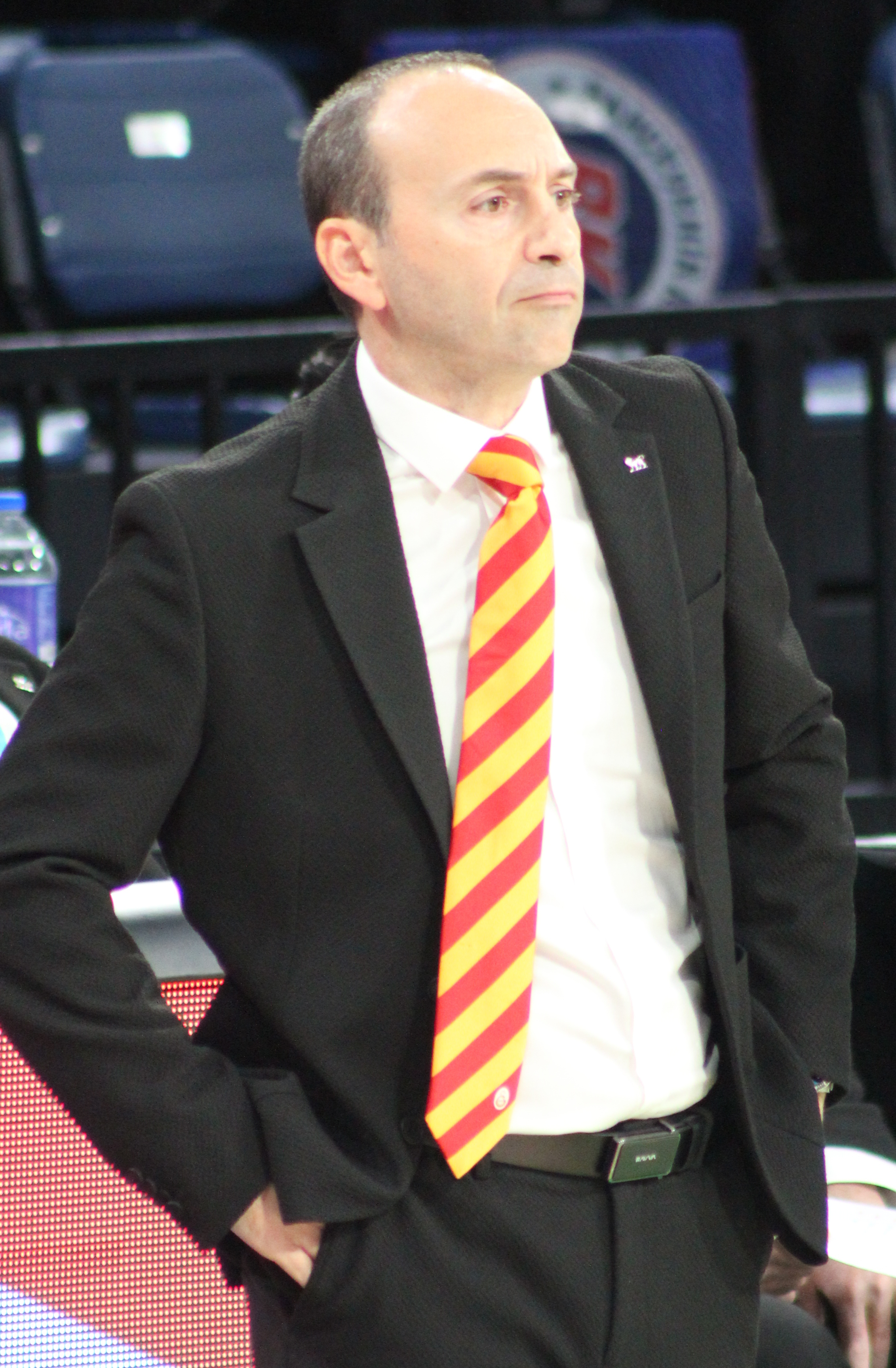

Personal information
- Born: February 10, 1980 (age 46) Istanbul, Turkey
- Position: Head coach
- Coaching career: 2005–present

Career history

Coaching
- 2005–2007: U–16 Darüşşafaka
- 2012–2017: Galatasaray (assistant)
- 2012–2017: Turkey (assistant)
- 2018–2023: Anadolu Efes (assistant)
- 2023–2024: Darüşşafaka
- 2024–2025: Galatasaray

Career highlights
- As assistant coach: 2× EuroLeague champion (2021, 2022); EuroCup champion (2016); 3× Turkish League champion (2013, 2019, 2021); 2× Turkish Cup winner (2018, 2022); 2× Turkish President's Cup winner (2018, 2019)

Yakup Sekizkök (born 10 February 1980, in Turkey) is a Turkish professional basketball coach. He is currently the head coach for Galatasaray Ekmas of the Turkish Basketbol Süper Ligi (BSL).

== Coaching career ==
In 2022, Sekizkök helped Efes to win their second straight championship in the EuroLeague as they won against Real Madrid Baloncesto.

On June 23, 2023, he signed with Darüşşafaka of the Turkish Basketbol Süper Ligi (BSL), for his first head coach experience.

On February 2, 2024, he signed with Galatasaray of the Turkish Basketbol Süper Ligi (BSL). Sekizkök finished the 2023-24 Basketbol Süper Ligi regular season 5th place.

On December 30, 2025, Galatasaray announced that they had parted ways with Sekizkök, who had been serving as head coach since February 2024.

== Personal life ==
He graduated with a degree in Economics at Koç University.
