= Romania at the 1952 Summer Olympics =

- IOC code: ROU
- NOC: Romanian Olympic Committee

in Helsinki
- Competitors: 114 in 15 sports
- Flag bearer: Dumitru Paraschivescu
- Medals Ranked 23rd: Gold 1 Silver 1 Bronze 2 Total 4

Summer Olympics appearances (overview)
- 1900; 1904–1920; 1924; 1928; 1932; 1936; 1948; 1952; 1956; 1960; 1964; 1968; 1972; 1976; 1980; 1984; 1988; 1992; 1996; 2000; 2004; 2008; 2012; 2016; 2020; 2024

Romania competed at the 1952 Summer Olympics in Helsinki, Finland. The nation returned to the Olympic Games after having missed the 1948 Summer Olympics. 114 competitors, 103 men and 11 women, took part in 67 events in 15 sports.

== Medalists ==
Medal	Name	Sport	Event	Date
Gold	Iosif Sîrbu	Shooting	Men's 50 metre rifle prone	
Silver	Vasile Tiță	Boxing	Middleweight	
Bronze	Gheorghe Fiat	Boxing	Lightweight	
Bronze	Gheorghe Lichiardopol	Shooting	Men's 25 metre rapid fire pistol	

== Basketball ==
Men's Team Competition

- Qualification Round (Group C)

- Lost to Canada (51-72)
- Lost to Italy (39-53) → did not advance, 23rd place

- Team Roster

- Dan Niculescu
- Mihai Nedef
- Andrei Folbert
- Corneliu Călugăreanu
- Grigore Costescu
- Emanoil Răducanu
- Ladislau Mokos
- Liviu Nagy
- Cezar Niculescu
- Adrian Petroșanu
- Vasile Popescu
- Gheorghe Constantinide

== Cycling ==
Road Competition

Men's Individual Road Race (190.4 km)

- Constantin Stanescu – 5:20:01.4 (→ 29th place)
- Marin Niculescu – 5:23:34.1 (→ 41st place)
- Victor Georgescu – 5:24:27.5 (→ 44th place)
- Petre Nuță – did not finish (→ no ranking)

Track Competition

Men's 1.000m Time Trial

- Ion Ionita

- Final – 1:14.4 (→ 7th place)

Men's 1.000m Sprint Scratch Race

- Ion Ionita – 25th place

== Fencing ==
Eight fencers, all men, represented Romania in 1952.

Men's foil

- Vasile Chelaru
- Nicolae Marinescu
- Andrei Vîlcea

Men's team foil

- Andrei Vîlcea, Ilie Tudor, Nicolae Marinescu, Vasile Chelaru

Men's épée

- Nicolae Marinescu
- Vasile Chelaru
- Zoltan Uray

Men's sabre

- Adalbert Gurath, Sr.
- Ilie Tudor
- Ion Santo

Men's team sabre

- Andrei Vîlcea, Ion Santo, Ilie Tudor, Mihai Kokossy

== Football ==
Preliminary Round

15 July 1952
19:00

Hungary	2–1	Romania
Czibor 21'; Kocsis 73'	Report	Suru 86'

Kupittaa, Turku
Attendance: 10,588
Referee: Nikolay Latyshev (URS)
- Team Roster

- Ion Voinescu
- Aurel Crâsnic
- Traian Popa
- Vasile Zavoda
- Zoltan Farmati
- Iosif Kovács
- Guido Fodor
- Iosif Ritter
- Valeriu Călinoiu
- Eugen Iordache
- Ștefan Balint
- Tiberiu Bone
- Titus Ozon
- Tudor Paraschiva
- Iosif Petschovski
- Gavril Serfözö
- Ioan Suru
- Gheorghe Bodo
- Andrei Mercea
- Francisc Zavoda

== Rowing ==
Romania had nine male rowers participate in one out of seven rowing events in 1952.

Men's eight

- Iosif Bergesz
- Milivoi Iancovici
- Ștefan Konyelicska
- Gheorghe Măcinic
- Ion Niga
- Ștefan Pongratz
- Alexandru Rotaru
- Ștefan Somogy
- Ion Vlăduț (cox)

== Shooting ==
Four shooters represented Romania in 1952. Iosif Sîrbu won gold in the 50 m rifle, prone event and Gheorghe Lichiardopol won bronze in the 25 m pistol.

25 m pistol

- Gheorghe Lichiardopol
- Penait Calcai

50 m rifle, three positions

- Iosif Sîrbu

50 m rifle, prone

- Iosif Sîrbu
- Petre Cișmigiu

== Swimming ==
Men

Rank given is within the heat.

Athlete	Event	Heat		Semifinal		Final	
Athlete	Event	Time	Rank	Time	Rank	Time	Rank
Iosif Novac	100 m freestyle	1:00.5	=3	Did not advance			
