= EuroBasket 2017 squads =

This article displays the squads of the teams that competed in EuroBasket 2017. Each team consists of 12 players.

Age and club as of the start of the tournament, 31 August 2017.

== Group A ==
=== Finland ===
The following is the squad in the EuroBasket 2017

Finland men's national basketball team – EuroBasket 2017 roster
Players
Coaches

| Pos. | No. | Name | Age – Date of birth | Height | Club | Ctr. |
|---|---|---|---|---|---|---|
| SG | 4 | Mikko Koivisto | 30 – 18 April 1987 | 1.94 m (6 ft 4 in) | Salon Vilpas Vikings | (Finland) |
| SF | 7 | Shawn Huff (C) | 33 – 5 May 1984 | 1.98 m (6 ft 6 in) | Skyliners Frankfurt | (Germany) |
| C | 8 | Gerald Lee | 29 – 23 November 1987 | 2.08 m (6 ft 10 in) | Helsinki Seagulls | (Finland) |
| SG | 9 | Sasu Salin | 26 – 11 June 1991 | 1.91 m (6 ft 3 in) | Gran Canaria | (Spain) |
| F/C | 10 | Tuukka Kotti | 36 – 18 March 1981 | 2.05 m (6 ft 9 in) | Crailsheim Merlins | (Germany) |
| PG | 11 | Petteri Koponen | 29 – 13 April 1988 | 1.94 m (6 ft 4 in) | FC Barcelona | (Spain) |
| SF | 12 | Matti Nuutinen | 27 – 6 May 1990 | 2.00 m (6 ft 7 in) | Chorale Roanne | (France) |
| PG | 15 | Teemu Rannikko | 36 – 9 September 1980 | 1.89 m (6 ft 2 in) | Kataja | (Finland) |
| SF | 22 | Carl Lindbom | 25 – 10 November 1991 | 2.06 m (6 ft 9 in) | Helsinki Seagulls | (Finland) |
| PF | 23 | Lauri Markkanen | 20 – 22 May 1997 | 2.13 m (7 ft 0 in) | Chicago Bulls | (United States) |
| PG | 31 | Jamar Wilson | 33 – 22 February 1984 | 1.85 m (6 ft 1 in) | Estudiantes | (Spain) |
| PF | 33 | Erik Murphy | 26 – 26 October 1990 | 2.08 m (6 ft 10 in) | Strasbourg | (France) |

Head coach

- (Finland) Henrik Dettmann

Assistant coach(es)

- (Finland) Mikko Larkas
- (Finland) Jukka Toijala
- (Finland) Lassi Tuovi

Legend

- (C) Team captain
- Club – describes last
  club before the tournament
- Age – describes age
  on 31 August 2017

=== France ===
The following is the squad in EuroBasket 2017:

France men's national basketball team – 2017 Eurobasket roster
Players
Coaches

| Pos. | No. | Name | Age – Date of birth | Height | Club | Ctr. |
|---|---|---|---|---|---|---|
| C | 1 | Kevin Séraphin | 27 – 7 December 1989 | 2.08 m (6 ft 10 in) | Indiana Pacers | (United States) |
| G | 4 | Thomas Heurtel | 28 – 10 April 1989 | 1.88 m (6 ft 2 in) | Anadolu Efes | (Turkey) |
| G | 6 | Antoine Diot | 28 – 17 January 1989 | 1.93 m (6 ft 4 in) | Valencia Basket | (Spain) |
| PF | 7 | Joffrey Lauvergne | 25 – 30 September 1991 | 2.09 m (6 ft 10 in) | Chicago Bulls | (United States) |
| SF | 10 | Evan Fournier | 24 – 29 October 1992 | 2.01 m (6 ft 7 in) | Orlando Magic | (United States) |
| G | 12 | Nando de Colo | 30 – 23 June 1987 | 1.96 m (6 ft 5 in) | CSKA Moscow | (Russia) |
| F | 13 | Boris Diaw (C) | 35 – 16 April 1982 | 2.03 m (6 ft 8 in) | Utah Jazz | (United States) |
| PG | 15 | Léo Westermann | 25 – 24 July 1992 | 1.96 m (6 ft 5 in) | Žalgiris Kaunas | (Lithuania) |
| C | 17 | Vincent Poirier | 23 – 27 October 1993 | 2.08 m (6 ft 10 in) | Paris-Levallois | (France) |
| PF | 25 | Louis Labeyrie | 25 – 11 February 1992 | 2.08 m (6 ft 10 in) | Paris-Levallois | (France) |
| SF | 33 | Axel Toupane | 25 – 23 July 1992 | 2.01 m (6 ft 7 in) | New Orleans Pelicans | (United States) |
| SG | 91 | Edwin Jackson | 27 – 18 September 1989 | 1.91 m (6 ft 3 in) | Estudiantes | (Spain) |

Head coach

- (France) Vincent Collet

Assistant coach(es)

- (France) Pascal Donnadieu
- (France) Laurent Foirest
- (France) Ruddy Nelhomme

Legend

- (C) Team captain
- Club – describes last
  club before the tournament
- Age – describes age
  on 31 August 2017

=== Greece ===
The following is the squad in the EuroBasket 2017.

Greece men's national basketball team – 2017 EuroBasket roster
Players
Coaches

| Pos. | No. | Name | Age – Date of birth | Height | Club | Ctr. |
|---|---|---|---|---|---|---|
| PG | 8 | Nick Calathes | 28 – 22 February 1989 | 1.98 m (6 ft 6 in) | Panathinaikos | (Greece) |
| C | 9 | Ioannis Bourousis (C) | 33 – 17 November 1983 | 2.15 m (7 ft 1 in) | Panathinaikos | (Greece) |
| G | 10 | Kostas Sloukas | 27 – 15 January 1990 | 1.90 m (6 ft 3 in) | Fenerbahçe | (Turkey) |
| SG | 11 | Nikos Pappas | 26 – 7 November 1990 | 1.95 m (6 ft 5 in) | Panathinaikos | (Greece) |
| C | 14 | Georgios Papagiannis | 20 – 3 July 1997 | 2.17 m (7 ft 1 in) | Sacramento Kings | (United States) |
| PF | 15 | Georgios Printezis | 32 – 22 February 1985 | 2.06 m (6 ft 9 in) | Olympiacos | (Greece) |
| SF | 16 | Kostas Papanikolaou | 27 – 1 August 1990 | 2.04 m (6 ft 8 in) | Olympiacos | (Greece) |
| G | 17 | Vangelis Mantzaris | 27 – 16 April 1990 | 1.96 m (6 ft 5 in) | Olympiacos | (Greece) |
| F/C | 18 | Dimitrios Agravanis | 22 – 20 December 1994 | 2.08 m (6 ft 10 in) | Olympiacos | (Greece) |
| F | 19 | Ioannis Papapetrou | 23 – 30 March 1994 | 2.06 m (6 ft 9 in) | Olympiacos | (Greece) |
| C | 31 | Georgios Bogris | 28 – 19 February 1989 | 2.10 m (6 ft 11 in) | Iberostar Tenerife | (Spain) |
| SF | 43 | Thanasis Antetokounmpo | 25 – 18 July 1992 | 2.01 m (6 ft 7 in) | Panathinaikos | (Greece) |

Head coach

- (Greece) Kostas Missas

Assistant coach(es)

- (Greece) Vasilis Geragotellis
- (Greece) Diamantis Panagiotopoulos

Legend

- Club – describes last
  club before the tournament
- Age – describes age
  on 26 August 2017

=== Iceland ===
The following is the squad in the EuroBasket 2017

Iceland men's national basketball team – EuroBasket 2017 roster
Players
Coaches

| Pos. | No. | Name | Age – Date of birth | Height | Club | Ctr. |
|---|---|---|---|---|---|---|
| SG | 1 | Martin Hermannsson | 22 – 16 September 1994 | 1.90 m (6 ft 3 in) | Champagne Basket | (France) |
| PG | 3 | Ægir Steinarsson | 26 – 10 May 1991 | 1.82 m (6 ft 0 in) | TAU Castelló | (Spain) |
| PF | 6 | Kristófer Acox | 23 – 13 October 1993 | 1.98 m (6 ft 6 in) | KR | (Iceland) |
| C | 8 | Hlynur Bæringsson | 35 – 6 July 1982 | 2.00 m (6 ft 7 in) | Stjarnan | (Iceland) |
| SG | 9 | Jón Arnór Stefánsson | 34 – 21 September 1982 | 1.96 m (6 ft 5 in) | KR | (Iceland) |
| PG | 10 | Elvar Már Friðriksson | 22 – 11 November 1994 | 1.82 m (6 ft 0 in) | Barry Buccaneers | (United States) |
| PG | 13 | Hörður Vilhjálmsson | 28 – 18 December 1988 | 1.90 m (6 ft 3 in) | Keflavík | (Iceland) |
| SG | 14 | Logi Gunnarsson | 35 – 5 September 1981 | 1.92 m (6 ft 4 in) | Njarðvíkur | (Iceland) |
| PG | 15 | Pavel Ermolinskij | 30 – 25 January 1987 | 2.02 m (6 ft 8 in) | KR | (Iceland) |
| SF | 24 | Haukur Helgi Pálsson | 25 – 18 May 1992 | 1.98 m (6 ft 6 in) | Cholet Basket | (France) |
| C | 34 | Tryggvi Hlinason | 19 – 28 October 1997 | 2.15 m (7 ft 1 in) | Valencia Basket | (Spain) |
| PG | 88 | Brynjar Þór Björnsson | 29 – 11 July 1988 | 1.88 m (6 ft 2 in) | KR | (Iceland) |

Head coach

- (Canada) Craig Pedersen

Assistant coach(es)

- (Iceland) Finnur Freyr Stefánsson
- (Iceland) Arnar Guðjónsson

Legend

- (C) Team captain
- Club – describes last
  club before the tournament
- Age – describes age
  on 31 August 2017

=== Poland ===
The following is the squad in the EuroBasket 2017.

Poland men's national basketball team roster roster
Players
Coaches

| Pos. | No. | Name | Age – Date of birth | Height | Club | Ctr. |
|---|---|---|---|---|---|---|
| SF | 3 | Michał Sokołowski | 24 – 11 December 1992 | 1.96 m (6 ft 5 in) | Rosa Radom | (Poland) |
| PF | 5 | Aaron Cel | 30 – 4 March 1987 | 2.03 m (6 ft 8 in) | Twarde Pierniki Toruń | (Poland) |
| PG | 6 | A. J. Slaughter | 30 – 3 August 1987 | 1.91 m (6 ft 3 in) | ASVEL | (France) |
| PF | 7 | Damian Kulig | 30 – 3 June 1987 | 2.06 m (6 ft 9 in) | Bandırma | (Turkey) |
| PG | 8 | Przemysław Zamojski | 30 – 16 December 1986 | 1.91 m (6 ft 3 in) | Zielona Góra | (Poland) |
| SF | 9 | Mateusz Ponitka | 24 – 29 August 1993 | 1.98 m (6 ft 6 in) | Iberostar Tenerife | (Spain) |
| SG | 12 | Adam Waczyński | 27 – 15 October 1989 | 1.96 m (6 ft 5 in) | Unicaja | (Spain) |
| PG | 15 | Łukasz Koszarek | 33 – 12 January 1984 | 1.87 m (6 ft 2 in) | Zielona Góra | (Poland) |
| PF | 21 | Tomasz Gielo | 24 – 4 January 1993 | 2.06 m (6 ft 9 in) | Joventut Badalona | (Spain) |
| C | 24 | Przemek Karnowski | 23 – 8 November 1993 | 2.16 m (7 ft 1 in) | MoraBanc Andorra | (Spain) |
| SF | 33 | Karol Gruszecki | 27 – 4 November 1989 | 1.96 m (6 ft 5 in) | Twarde Pierniki Toruń | (Poland) |
| C | 34 | Adam Hrycaniuk | 33 – 15 March 1984 | 2.06 m (6 ft 9 in) | Zielona Góra | (Poland) |

Head coach

- (United States) Mike Taylor

Assistant coach(es)

- (Poland) Wojciech Kamiński
- (Poland) Krzysztof Szablowski
- (Poland) Arkadiusz Miłoszewski

Legend

- (C) Team captain
- Club – describes last
  club before the tournament
- Age – describes age
  on 31 August 2017

=== Slovenia ===
The following is the squad in the EuroBasket 2017.

Slovenia men's national basketball team roster
Players
Coaches

| Pos. | No. | Name | Age – Date of birth | Height | Club | Ctr. |
|---|---|---|---|---|---|---|
| PF | 0 | Anthony Randolph | 28 – 15 July 1989 | 2.11 m (6 ft 11 in) | Real Madrid | (Spain) |
| PG | 1 | Matic Rebec | 22 – 24 January 1995 | 1.80 m (5 ft 11 in) | Krka | (Slovenia) |
| PG | 3 | Goran Dragić (C) | 31 – 6 May 1986 | 1.91 m (6 ft 3 in) | Miami Heat | (United States) |
| PG | 6 | Aleksej Nikolić | 22 – 21 February 1995 | 1.91 m (6 ft 3 in) | Brose Bamberg | (Germany) |
| SG | 7 | Klemen Prepelič | 24 – 20 October 1992 | 1.91 m (6 ft 3 in) | Limoges CSP | (France) |
| SF | 8 | Edo Murić | 25 – 27 November 1991 | 2.02 m (6 ft 8 in) | Banvit | (Turkey) |
| SG | 11 | Jaka Blažič | 27 – 30 June 1990 | 1.96 m (6 ft 5 in) | Baskonia | (Spain) |
| C | 14 | Gašper Vidmar | 29 – 14 September 1987 | 2.11 m (6 ft 11 in) | Banvit | (Turkey) |
| PF | 17 | Saša Zagorac | 33 – 1 January 1984 | 2.06 m (6 ft 9 in) | Parma Basket | (Russia) |
| C | 22 | Žiga Dimec | 24 – 20 February 1993 | 2.11 m (6 ft 11 in) | Krka | (Slovenia) |
| SF | 31 | Vlatko Čančar | 20 – 10 April 1997 | 2.03 m (6 ft 8 in) | Mega Leks | (Serbia) |
| G | 77 | Luka Dončić | 18 – 28 February 1999 | 2.01 m (6 ft 7 in) | Real Madrid | (Spain) |

Head coach

- (Serbia) Igor Kokoškov

Assistant coach(es)

- (Slovenia) Aleksander Sekulić
- (Slovenia) Jaka Lakovič
- (Slovenia) Rado Trifunović

Legend

- (C) Team captain
- Club – describes last
  club before the tournament
- Age – describes age
  on 31 August 2017

== Group B ==
=== Georgia ===
The following is the squad in the EuroBasket 2017.

Georgia men's national basketball team roster
Players
Coaches

| Pos. | No. | Name | Age – Date of birth | Height | Club | Ctr. |
|---|---|---|---|---|---|---|
| PG | 3 | Michael Dixon | 26 – 1 December 1990 | 1.86 m (6 ft 1 in) | AEK Athens | (Greece) |
| PG | 4 | Giorgi Gamqrelidze | 31 – 4 February 1986 | 1.83 m (6 ft 0 in) | Titebi Tbilisi | (Georgia (country)) |
| SG | 6 | Anatoli Boisa | 33 – 9 September 1983 | 1.94 m (6 ft 4 in) | Kutaisi | (Georgia (country)) |
| C | 7 | Zaza Pachulia (C) | 33 – 10 February 1984 | 2.11 m (6 ft 11 in) | Golden State Warriors | (United States) |
| PG | 8 | Giorgi Tsintsadze | 31 – 7 February 1986 | 1.92 m (6 ft 4 in) | Kutaisi | (Georgia (country)) |
| C | 9 | Giorgi Shermadini | 28 – 2 April 1989 | 2.16 m (7 ft 1 in) | MoraBanc Andorra | (Spain) |
| SF | 10 | Duda Sanadze | 25 – 25 July 1992 | 1.96 m (6 ft 5 in) | Primorska | (Slovenia) |
| SF | 11 | Manuchar Markoishvili | 30 – 17 November 1986 | 1.97 m (6 ft 6 in) | Free agent |
| PF | 17 | Mikheil Berishvili | 30 – 12 April 1987 | 2.03 m (6 ft 8 in) | Dinamo Tbilisi | (Georgia (country)) |
| PF | 23 | Tornike Shengelia | 24 – 5 October 1991 | 2.07 m (6 ft 9 in) | Baskonia | (Spain) |
| C | 35 | Goga Bitadze | 18 – 20 July 1999 | 2.11 m (6 ft 11 in) | Mega Bemax | (Serbia) |
| C | 99 | Ilia Londaridze | 27 – 27 September 1989 | 2.06 m (6 ft 9 in) | Dinamo Tbilisi | (Georgia (country)) |

Head coach

- (Greece) Ilias Zouros

Assistant coach(es)

- (Slovenia) Jurica Golemac
- (Serbia) Miloš Gligorijević
- (Georgia (country)) Irakli Khoshtaria
- (Georgia (country)) Kote Tugushi

Legend

- Club – describes last
  club before the tournament
- Age – describes age
  on 31 August 2017

=== Germany ===
The following is the squad in the EuroBasket 2017.

Germany men's national basketball team – EuroBasket 2017 roster
Players
Coaches

| Pos. | No. | Name | Age – Date of birth | Height | Club | Ctr. |
|---|---|---|---|---|---|---|
| PG | 4 | Maodo Lô | 25 – 12 March 1992 | 1.91 m (6 ft 3 in) | Brose Bamberg | (Germany) |
| C | 7 | Johannes Voigtmann | 24 – 30 September 1992 | 2.11 m (6 ft 11 in) | Baskonia | (Spain) |
| SG | 8 | Lucca Staiger | 29 – 14 June 1988 | 1.96 m (6 ft 5 in) | Brose Bamberg | (Germany) |
| PG | 9 | Karsten Tadda | 28 – 2 November 1988 | 1.91 m (6 ft 3 in) | ratiopharm Ulm | (Germany) |
| F/C | 10 | Daniel Theis | 25 – 4 April 1992 | 2.06 m (6 ft 9 in) | Brose Bamberg | (Germany) |
| SF | 12 | Robin Benzing (C) | 28 – 25 January 1989 | 2.08 m (6 ft 10 in) | CAI Zaragoza | (Spain) |
| PG | 17 | Dennis Schröder | 23 – 15 September 1993 | 1.85 m (6 ft 1 in) | Atlanta Hawks | (United States) |
| PG | 18 | İsmet Akpınar | 22 – 22 May 1995 | 1.91 m (6 ft 3 in) | Alba Berlin | (Germany) |
| F/C | 22 | Danilo Barthel | 25 – 24 October 1991 | 2.08 m (6 ft 10 in) | Bayern Munich | (Germany) |
| F/C | 32 | Johannes Thiemann | 23 – 9 February 1994 | 2.05 m (6 ft 9 in) | MHP Riesen Ludwigsburg | (Germany) |
| SF | 33 | Patrick Heckmann | 25 – 27 February 1992 | 1.98 m (6 ft 6 in) | Brose Bamberg | (Germany) |
| F/C | 55 | Isaiah Hartenstein | 19 – 5 May 1998 | 2.13 m (7 ft 0 in) | Žalgiris Kaunas | (Lithuania) |

Head coach

- (United States) Chris Fleming

Assistant coach(es)

- (Germany) Henrik Rödl
- (Austria) Martin Schiller
- (United States) Alex Jensen

Legend

- (C) Team captain
- Club – describes last
  club before the tournament
- Age – describes age
  on 31 August 2017

=== Israel ===
The following is the squad in the EuroBasket 2017

Israel men's national basketball team – EuroBasket 2017 roster
Players
Coaches

| Pos. | No. | Name | Age – Date of birth | Height | Club | Ctr. |
|---|---|---|---|---|---|---|
| C | 1 | Richard Howell | 26 – 26 September 1990 | 2.03 m (6 ft 8 in) | Hapoel Jerusalem | (Israel) |
| G/F | 6 | Shawn Dawson | 23 – 12 December 1993 | 1.98 m (6 ft 6 in) | Maccabi Rishon LeZion | (Israel) |
| PG | 7 | Gal Mekel | 29 – 4 March 1988 | 1.91 m (6 ft 3 in) | Maccabi Tel Aviv | (Israel) |
| PF | 8 | Lior Eliyahu | 31 – 9 September 1985 | 2.03 m (6 ft 8 in) | Hapoel Jerusalem | (Israel) |
| SF | 9 | Omri Casspi (C) | 29 – 22 June 1988 | 2.06 m (6 ft 9 in) | Minnesota Timberwolves | (United States) |
| SF | 10 | Guy Pnini | 33 – 4 September 1983 | 2.01 m (6 ft 7 in) | Maccabi Tel Aviv | (Israel) |
| PF | 11 | Elishay Kadir | 29 – 4 November 1987 | 2.02 m (6 ft 8 in) | Maccabi Rishon LeZion | (Israel) |
| SG | 12 | Yotam Halperin | 33 – 24 January 1984 | 1.93 m (6 ft 4 in) | Hapoel Jerusalem | (Israel) |
| PF | 14 | Oz Blayzer | 24 – 29 December 1992 | 2.03 m (6 ft 8 in) | Maccabi Haifa | (Israel) |
| G | 15 | Bar Timor | 25 – 2 March 1992 | 1.91 m (6 ft 3 in) | Hapoel Jerusalem | (Israel) |
| C | 20 | Idan Zalmanson | 22 – 18 April 1995 | 2.06 m (6 ft 9 in) | Maccabi Rishon LeZion | (Israel) |
| PG | 21 | Yogev Ohayon | 30 – 24 April 1987 | 1.89 m (6 ft 2 in) | Maccabi Tel Aviv | (Israel) |

Head coach

- (Israel) Erez Edelstein

Assistant coach(es)

- (Israel) Dan Shamir
- (Israel) Alon Stein
- (Israel) Modi Maor
- (Israel) Avi Kowalski

General Manager

- (Israel) Pini Gershon

Legend

- (C) Team captain
- Club – describes last
  club before the tournament
- Age – describes age
  on 31 August 2017

=== Italy ===
The following is the squad in the EuroBasket 2017.

Italy men's national basketball team – EuroBasket 2017 roster
Players
Coaches

| Pos. | No. | Name | Age – Date of birth | Height | Club | Ctr. |
|---|---|---|---|---|---|---|
| PG | 0 | Daniel Hackett | 29 – 19 December 1987 | 1.97 m (6 ft 6 in) | Olympiacos | (Greece) |
| SG | 3 | Marco Belinelli | 31 – 25 March 1986 | 1.96 m (6 ft 5 in) | Charlotte Hornets | (United States) |
| SG | 4 | Pietro Aradori | 28 – 9 December 1988 | 1.96 m (6 ft 5 in) | Grissin Bon Reggio Emilia | (Italy) |
| PG | 5 | Ariel Filloy | 30 – 11 March 1987 | 1.90 m (6 ft 3 in) | Reyer Venezia | (Italy) |
| C | 6 | Paul Biligha | 27 – 31 May 1990 | 2.00 m (6 ft 7 in) | Vanoli Cremona | (Italy) |
| PF | 9 | Nicolò Melli | 26 – 26 January 1991 | 2.05 m (6 ft 9 in) | Brose Bamberg | (Germany) |
| C | 12 | Marco Cusin | 32 – 28 February 1985 | 2.11 m (6 ft 11 in) | Sidigas Avellino | (Italy) |
| PG | 20 | Andrea Cinciarini | 31 – 21 June 1986 | 1.93 m (6 ft 4 in) | Olimpia Milano | (Italy) |
| SF | 23 | Awudu Abass | 24 – 27 January 1993 | 2.00 m (6 ft 7 in) | Olimpia Milano | (Italy) |
| PF | 24 | Filippo Baldi Rossi | 25 – 26 October 1991 | 2.07 m (6 ft 9 in) | Dolomiti Energia Trento | (Italy) |
| C | 32 | Christian Burns | 31 – 4 September 1985 | 2.03 m (6 ft 8 in) | Germani Basket Brescia | (Italy) |
| SF | 70 | Luigi Datome (C) | 29 – 27 November 1987 | 2.03 m (6 ft 8 in) | Fenerbahçe | (Turkey) |

Head coach

- (Italy) Ettore Messina

Assistant coach(es)

- (Italy) Giordano Consolini
- (Italy) Stefano Sacripanti
- (Italy) Mario Fioretti
- (Italy) Riccardo Fois

Legend

- (C) Team captain
- Club – describes last
  club before the tournament
- Age – describes age
  on 31 August 2017

=== Lithuania ===
The following is the squad in the EuroBasket 2017.

Lithuania men's national basketball team – EuroBasket 2017 roster
Players
Coaches

| Pos. | No. | Name | Age – Date of birth | Height | Club | Ctr. |
|---|---|---|---|---|---|---|
| G | 5 | Mantas Kalnietis (C) | 30 – 6 September 1986 | 1.96 m (6 ft 5 in) | Olimpia Milano | (Italy) |
| G | 7 | Adas Juškevičius | 28 – 3 January 1989 | 1.94 m (6 ft 4 in) | Tecnyconta Zaragoza | (Spain) |
| F | 8 | Jonas Mačiulis | 32 – 10 February 1985 | 2.01 m (6 ft 7 in) | Real Madrid | (Spain) |
| SG | 13 | Martynas Gecevičius | 29 – 16 May 1988 | 1.93 m (6 ft 4 in) | Tecnyconta Zaragoza | (Spain) |
| C | 17 | Jonas Valančiūnas | 25 – 6 May 1992 | 2.13 m (7 ft 0 in) | Toronto Raptors | (Canada) |
| F | 19 | Mindaugas Kuzminskas | 28 – 20 January 1989 | 2.06 m (6 ft 9 in) | New York Knicks | (United States) |
| C | 20 | Donatas Motiejūnas | 26 – 20 September 1990 | 2.13 m (7 ft 0 in) | New Orleans Pelicans | (United States) |
| SG | 21 | Artūras Milaknis | 31 – 16 June 1986 | 1.95 m (6 ft 5 in) | Žalgiris Kaunas | (Lithuania) |
| F | 22 | Eimantas Bendžius | 27 – 23 April 1990 | 2.03 m (6 ft 8 in) | Obradoiro | (Spain) |
| G/F | 40 | Marius Grigonis | 23 – 26 April 1994 | 1.98 m (6 ft 6 in) | Iberostar Tenerife | (Spain) |
| C | 77 | Artūras Gudaitis | 24 – 19 June 1993 | 2.08 m (6 ft 10 in) | Lietuvos rytas | (Lithuania) |
| SF | 92 | Edgaras Ulanovas | 25 – 7 January 1992 | 1.98 m (6 ft 6 in) | Žalgiris Kaunas | (Lithuania) |

Head coach

- (Lithuania) Dainius Adomaitis

Assistant coach(es)

- (Lithuania) Ramūnas Šiškauskas
- (Lithuania) Benas Matkevičius

Legend

- (C) Team captain
- Club – describes last
  club before the tournament
- Age – describes age
  on 31 August 2017

=== Ukraine ===
The following is the squad in the EuroBasket 2017.

Ukraine men's national basketball team – EuroBasket 2017 roster
Players
Coaches

| Pos. | No. | Name | Age – Date of birth | Height | Club | Ctr. |
|---|---|---|---|---|---|---|
| SF | 4 | Maksym Pustozvonov | 30 – 16 April 1987 | 2.00 m (6 ft 7 in) | U-BT Cluj-Napoca | (Romania) |
| SG | 5 | Oleksandr Kolchenko | 28 – 20 September 1988 | 1.95 m (6 ft 5 in) | Cherkaski Mavpy | (Ukraine) |
| PG | 7 | Denys Lukashov | 28 – 30 April 1989 | 1.88 m (6 ft 2 in) | Enisey | (Russia) |
| SG | 9 | Ruslan Otverchenko | 27 – 6 January 1990 | 1.94 m (6 ft 4 in) | Budivelnyk | (Ukraine) |
| G/F | 11 | Oleksandr Lypovyy | 25 – 9 October 1991 | 2.00 m (6 ft 7 in) | Promitheas Patras | (Greece) |
| PF | 12 | Maksym Korniyenko | 30 – 26 June 1987 | 2.06 m (6 ft 9 in) | Lukoil Academic | (Bulgaria) |
| SF | 13 | Vyacheslav Bobrov | 24 – 19 September 1992 | 2.02 m (6 ft 8 in) | Quimper | (France) |
| F/C | 14 | Ihor Zaytsev | 28 – 11 May 1989 | 2.10 m (6 ft 11 in) | Rosa Radom | (Poland) |
| C | 15 | Viacheslav Kravtsov | 30 – 25 August 1987 | 2.13 m (7 ft 0 in) | Valencia | (Spain) |
| C | 23 | Artem Pustovyi | 25 – 25 June 1992 | 2.18 m (7 ft 2 in) | Obradoiro CAB | (Spain) |
| SF | 24 | Vladimir Konev | 28 – 18 June 1989 | 2.03 m (6 ft 8 in) | Khimik | (Ukraine) |
| PG | 31 | Olexandr Mishula | 25 – 18 April 1992 | 1.94 m (6 ft 4 in) | BC Dnipro | (Ukraine) |

Head coach

- (Ukraine) Yevgen Murzin

Assistant coach(es)

- (Ukraine) Alexander Lokhmanchuk
- (Ukraine) Leonid Ivatin
- (Ukraine) Yaroslav Zubrytskyy

Legend

- (C) Team captain
- Club – describes last
  club before the tournament
- Age – describes age
  on 31 August 2017

== Group C ==
=== Croatia ===
The following is the Croatia roster in the men's basketball tournament of the 2017 EuroBasket.

Croatia men's national basketball team – 2017 EuroBasket roster
Players
Coaches

| Pos. | No. | Name | Age – Date of birth | Height | Club | Ctr. |
|---|---|---|---|---|---|---|
| SG | 5 | Filip Krušlin | 28 – 18 March 1989 | 1.96 m (6 ft 5 in) | Cedevita | (Croatia) |
| G | 6 | Marko Popović | 35 – 12 June 1982 | 1.85 m (6 ft 1 in) | Fuenlabrada | (Spain) |
| G/F | 7 | Krunoslav Simon | 32 – 24 June 1985 | 1.97 m (6 ft 6 in) | Olimpia Milano | (Italy) |
| F | 9 | Dario Šarić | 23 – 8 April 1994 | 2.08 m (6 ft 10 in) | Philadelphia 76ers | (United States) |
| G | 10 | Roko Ukić (C) | 32 – 5 December 1984 | 1.96 m (6 ft 5 in) | AEK Athens | (Greece) |
| C | 11 | Luka Žorić | 32 – 5 November 1984 | 2.11 m (6 ft 11 in) | Cibona | (Croatia) |
| C | 12 | Darko Planinić | 26 – 22 November 1990 | 2.11 m (6 ft 11 in) | Gran Canaria | (Spain) |
| F/C | 17 | Dragan Bender | 19 – 17 November 1997 | 2.16 m (7 ft 1 in) | Phoenix Suns | (United States) |
| F/C | 25 | Ivan Buva | 26 – 6 May 1991 | 2.08 m (6 ft 10 in) | Bilbao Basket | (Spain) |
| SF | 27 | Ivan Ramljak | 27 – 9 August 1990 | 2.03 m (6 ft 8 in) | Zadar | (Croatia) |
| G/F | 33 | Marko Tomas | 32 – 3 January 1985 | 2.01 m (6 ft 7 in) | Cedevita | (Croatia) |
| G/F | 44 | Bojan Bogdanović | 28 – 18 April 1989 | 2.03 m (6 ft 8 in) | Utah Jazz | (United States) |

Head coach

- (Croatia) Aleksandar Petrović

Assistant coach(es)

- (Croatia) Ivica Skelin
- (Croatia) Dražen Orešković

Conditioning trainer

- (Croatia) Jurica Šango

Legend

- (C) Team captain
- Club – describes last
  club before the tournament
- Age – describes age
  on 31 August 2017

=== Czech Republic ===
The following is the Czech Republic roster in the men's basketball tournament of the 2017 EuroBasket.

Czech Republic men's national basketball team – 2017 EuroBasket roster
Players
Coaches

| Pos. | No. | Name | Age – Date of birth | Height | Club | Ctr. |
|---|---|---|---|---|---|---|
| PF | 1 | Patrik Auda | 28 – 29 August 1989 | 2.06 m (6 ft 9 in) | Manresa | (Spain) |
| SF | 7 | Vojtěch Hruban | 28 – 29 August 1989 | 2.00 m (6 ft 7 in) | ČEZ Nymburk | (Czech Republic) |
| PG | 8 | Tomáš Satoranský | 25 – 30 October 1991 | 2.00 m (6 ft 7 in) | Washington Wizards | (United States) |
| SG | 9 | Jiří Welsch | 37 – 27 January 1980 | 2.00 m (6 ft 7 in) | ČEZ Nymburk | (Czech Republic) |
| SF | 11 | Lukáš Palyza | 27 – 10 November 1989 | 2.02 m (6 ft 8 in) | Děčín | (Czech Republic) |
| PG | 13 | Jakub Šiřina | 29 – 21 November 1987 | 1.87 m (6 ft 2 in) | Opava | (Czech Republic) |
| PF | 14 | Kamil Švrdlík | 30 – 25 November 1986 | 2.05 m (6 ft 9 in) | Pardubice | (Czech Republic) |
| PF | 15 | Martin Peterka | 22 – 12 January 1995 | 2.05 m (6 ft 9 in) | ČEZ Nymburk | (Czech Republic) |
| G | 17 | Jaromír Bohačík | 25 – 26 May 1992 | 1.97 m (6 ft 6 in) | USK Praha | (Czech Republic) |
| PF | 23 | Adam Pecháček | 22 – 19 February 1995 | 2.07 m (6 ft 9 in) | Obradoiro | (Spain) |
| SF | 31 | Martin Kříž | 24 – 17 June 1993 | 2.00 m (6 ft 7 in) | ČEZ Nymburk | (Czech Republic) |
| SG | 71 | Tomáš Kyzlink | 24 – 18 June 1993 | 1.95 m (6 ft 5 in) | JL Bourg | (France) |

Head coach

- (Israel) Ronen Ginzburg

Assistant coach(es)

- (Czech Republic) Pavel Beneš
- (Czech Republic) Lubomir Ružička

Legend

- (C) Team captain
- Club – describes last
  club before the tournament
- Age – describes age
  on 31 August 2017

=== Hungary ===
Hungary men's national basketball team – 2017 EuroBasket roster
Players
Coaches

| Pos. | No. | Name | Age – Date of birth | Height | Club | Ctr. |
|---|---|---|---|---|---|---|
| PG | 4 | András Ruják | 29 – 30 July 1988 | 1.88 m (6 ft 2 in) | Soproni | (Hungary) |
| PF | 5 | Rosco Allen | 24 – 5 May 1993 | 2.06 m (6 ft 9 in) | Obradoiro | (Spain) |
| C | 6 | Ákos Keller | 28 – 28 March 1989 | 2.09 m (6 ft 10 in) | Alba Fehérvár | (Hungary) |
| PG | 7 | Krisztián Wittmann | 32 – 22 May 1985 | 1.85 m (6 ft 1 in) | Szolnoki Olaj KK | (Hungary) |
| SF | 8 | Ádám Hanga | 28 – 12 April 1989 | 2.01 m (6 ft 7 in) | Baskonia | (Spain) |
| SG | 9 | Dávid Vojvoda | 26 – 4 September 1990 | 1.96 m (6 ft 5 in) | Szolnoki Olaj KK | (Hungary) |
| SG | 10 | Péter Kovács | 27 – 25 October 1989 | 1.89 m (6 ft 2 in) | Falco Szombathely | (Hungary) |
| PF | 12 | Norbert Tóth | 30 – 4 September 1986 | 2.04 m (6 ft 8 in) | Falco Szombathely | (Hungary) |
| SF | 15 | Csaba Ferencz | 32 – 24 May 1985 | 1.94 m (6 ft 4 in) | Egis Körmend | (Hungary) |
| SG | 20 | Zoltán Perl | 22 – 28 July 1995 | 1.94 m (6 ft 4 in) | Universo Treviso | (Italy) |
| C | 21 | Kemal Karahodžić | 28 – 26 July 1989 | 2.10 m (6 ft 11 in) | KTE-Duna Aszfalt | (Hungary) |
| PF | 22 | János Eilingsfeld | 26 – 5 February 1991 | 1.98 m (6 ft 6 in) | Szolnoki Olaj | (Hungary) |

Head coach

- (Montenegro) Stojan Ivković

Assistant coach(es)

- (Hungary) Gábor Forray
- (Hungary) Péter Pór

Legend

- Club – describes last
  club before the tournament
- Age – describes age
  on 31 August 2017

=== Montenegro ===
The following is the Montenegro roster in the men's basketball tournament of the 2017 EuroBasket.

Montenegro men's national basketball team – 2017 EuroBasket roster
Players
Coaches

| Pos. | No. | Name | Age – Date of birth | Height | Club | Ctr. |
|---|---|---|---|---|---|---|
| PG | 2 | Tyrese Rice | 30 – 15 May 1987 | 1.85 m (6 ft 1 in) | Shenzhen Leopards | (China) |
| C | 4 | Nikola Vučević | 26 – 24 October 1990 | 2.13 m (7 ft 0 in) | Orlando Magic | (United States) |
| SF | 6 | Suad Šehović | 29 – 13 August 1988 | 1.97 m (6 ft 6 in) | Budućnost Podgorica | (Montenegro) |
| PG | 7 | Nikola Pavličević | 29 – 13 August 1988 | 1.92 m (6 ft 4 in) | Sutjeska Nikšić | (Montenegro) |
| SF | 8 | Dino Radončić | 18 – 8 January 1999 | 2.01 m (6 ft 7 in) | Real Madrid | (Spain) |
| PF | 11 | Marko Todorović | 25 – 19 April 1992 | 2.10 m (6 ft 11 in) | Khimki | (Russia) |
| F/C | 14 | Bojan Dubljević | 25 – 24 October 1991 | 2.05 m (6 ft 9 in) | Valencia Basket | (Spain) |
| PF | 15 | Filip Barović | 27 – 29 July 1990 | 2.06 m (6 ft 9 in) | Budućnost Podgorica | (Montenegro) |
| SG | 17 | Vladimir Mihailović | 30 – 19 February 1987 | 1.94 m (6 ft 4 in) | Oostende | (Belgium) |
| PG | 20 | Nikola Ivanović | 23 – 19 February 1994 | 1.90 m (6 ft 3 in) | Budućnost Podgorica | (Montenegro) |
| SG | 21 | Nemanja Vranješ | 29 – 11 May 1988 | 1.91 m (6 ft 3 in) | Mornar Bar | (Montenegro) |
| SF | 22 | Nemanja Đurišić | 25 – 23 February 1992 | 2.06 m (6 ft 9 in) | Telekom Baskets Bonn | (Germany) |

Head coach

- (Montenegro) Zvezdan Mitrović

Assistant coach(es)

- (Montenegro) Veljko Perović
- (Montenegro) Dušan Dubljević
- (Montenegro) Boško Radović

Legend

- Club – describes last
  club before the tournament
- Age – describes age
  on 31 August 2017

=== Romania ===
The following is the Romania roster in the men's basketball tournament of the 2017 EuroBasket.

Romania men's national basketball team – 2017 EuroBasket roster
Players
Coaches

| Pos. | No. | Name | Age – Date of birth | Height | Club | Ctr. |
|---|---|---|---|---|---|---|
| SG | 4 | Andrei Mandache | 29 – 2 October 1987 | 1.87 m (6 ft 2 in) | CSM Oradea | (Romania) |
| PG | 6 | Cătălin Petrișor | 25 – 9 August 1992 | 1.84 m (6 ft 0 in) | CSM Oradea | (Romania) |
| SF | 8 | Radu Paliciuc | 28 – 13 September 1988 | 2.00 m (6 ft 7 in) | CSU Sibiu | (Romania) |
| F/C | 9 | Vlad Moldoveanu | 29 – 11 February 1988 | 2.09 m (6 ft 10 in) | U-BT Cluj-Napoca | (Romania) |
| SF | 10 | Bogdan Nicolescu | 20 – 3 January 1997 | 1.99 m (6 ft 6 in) | CSM Oradea | (Romania) |
| PG | 11 | Octavian Calota | 32 – 22 November 1984 | 1.86 m (6 ft 1 in) | SCM Timișoara | (Romania) |
| C | 13 | Alexandru Olah | 23 – 15 October 1993 | 2.12 m (6 ft 11 in) | Belfius Mons-Hainaut | (Belgium) |
| PF | 14 | Titus Nicoara | 29 – 25 March 1988 | 2.03 m (6 ft 8 in) | CSM Oradea | (Romania) |
| C | 15 | Emanuel Cățe | 20 – 30 July 1997 | 2.07 m (6 ft 9 in) | Sevilla | (Spain) |
| PF | 25 | Rolland Török | 26 – 25 October 1990 | 2.03 m (6 ft 8 in) | U-BT Cluj-Napoca | (Romania) |
| C | 26 | Cătălin Baciu | 29 – 26 August 1988 | 2.14 m (7 ft 0 in) | Steaua București | (Romania) |
| SF | 32 | Nandor Kuti | 20 – 10 January 1997 | 1.96 m (6 ft 5 in) | U-BT Cluj-Napoca | (Romania) |

Head coach

- (Romania) Marcel Tenter

Assistant coach(es)

- (Romania) Milorad Petrović
- (Romania) Marius Toma
- (United States) Scott Simpson
- (Serbia) Dragan Milosavljević

Legend

- Club – describes last
  club before the tournament
- Age – describes age
  on 31 August 2017

=== Spain ===
The following is the Spain roster in the men's basketball tournament of the 2017 EuroBasket.

Spain men's national basketball team – 2017 EuroBasket roster
Players
Coaches

| Pos. | No. | Name | Age – Date of birth | Height | Club | Ctr. |
|---|---|---|---|---|---|---|
| F/C | 4 | Pau Gasol | 37 – 6 June 1980 | 2.13 m (7 ft 0 in) | San Antonio Spurs | (United States) |
| PG | 6 | Sergio Rodríguez | 31 – 12 June 1986 | 1.90 m (6 ft 3 in) | Philadelphia 76ers | (United States) |
| SG | 7 | Juan Carlos Navarro | 37 – 13 June 1980 | 1.93 m (6 ft 4 in) | FC Barcelona | (Spain) |
| PG | 9 | Ricky Rubio | 26 – 21 October 1990 | 1.93 m (6 ft 4 in) | Utah Jazz | (United States) |
| C | 13 | Marc Gasol | 32 – 29 January 1985 | 2.16 m (7 ft 1 in) | Memphis Grizzlies | (United States) |
| C | 14 | Willy Hernangómez | 23 – 27 May 1994 | 2.10 m (6 ft 11 in) | New York Knicks | (United States) |
| G/F | 15 | Joan Sastre | 25 – 10 December 1991 | 2.04 m (6 ft 8 in) | Valencia Basket | (Spain) |
| PG | 16 | Guillem Vives | 24 – 16 June 1993 | 1.92 m (6 ft 4 in) | Valencia Basket | (Spain) |
| F/C | 18 | Pierre Oriola | 24 – 25 September 1992 | 2.06 m (6 ft 9 in) | Valencia Basket | (Spain) |
| G/F | 19 | Fernando San Emeterio | 33 – 1 January 1984 | 1.99 m (6 ft 6 in) | Valencia Basket | (Spain) |
| SF | 21 | Álex Abrines | 24 – 1 August 1993 | 1.98 m (6 ft 6 in) | Oklahoma City Thunder | (United States) |
| PF | 41 | Juan Hernangómez | 22 – 9 August 1995 | 2.06 m (6 ft 9 in) | Denver Nuggets | (United States) |

Head coach

- (Italy) Sergio Scariolo

Assistant coach(es)

- (Spain) Jaume Ponsarnau
- (Spain) Txus Vidorreta
- (Spain) Ángel Sánchez-Cañete

Legend

- Club – describes last
  club before the tournament
- Age – describes age
  on 31 August 2017

== Group D ==
=== Belgium ===
The following is the squad in the EuroBasket 2017.

Belgium men's national basketball team – EuroBasket 2017 roster
Players
Coaches

| Pos. | No. | Name | Age – Date of birth | Height | Club | Ctr. |
|---|---|---|---|---|---|---|
| PG | 4 | Manu Lecomte | 22 – 16 August 1995 | 1.80 m (5 ft 11 in) | Agua Caliente | (United States) |
| PG | 5 | Sam Van Rossom | 31 – 3 June 1986 | 1.88 m (6 ft 2 in) | Valencia | (Spain) |
| PF | 7 | Axel Hervelle | 34 – 2 May 1983 | 2.04 m (6 ft 8 in) | Bilbao | (Spain) |
| PF | 8 | Jean-Marc Mwema | 27 – 5 December 1989 | 1.95 m (6 ft 5 in) | Oostende | (Belgium) |
| SG | 9 | Jonathan Tabu | 31 – 7 October 1985 | 1.84 m (6 ft 0 in) | Bilbao | (Spain) |
| PG | 10 | Quentin Serron | 27 – 25 February 1990 | 1.90 m (6 ft 3 in) | Gravelines-Dunkerque | (France) |
| F | 12 | Jean Salumu | 27 – 26 July 1990 | 1.93 m (6 ft 4 in) | Oostende | (Belgium) |
| PF | 13 | Pierre-Antoine Gillet | 26 – 16 April 1991 | 2.01 m (6 ft 7 in) | Oostende | (Belgium) |
| PF | 14 | Maxime De Zeeuw | 30 – 26 April 1987 | 2.04 m (6 ft 8 in) | Oldenburg | (Germany) |
| C | 16 | Kevin Tumba | 26 – 23 February 1991 | 2.06 m (6 ft 9 in) | Murcia | (Spain) |
| C | 19 | Ismaël Bako | 21 – 10 October 1995 | 2.08 m (6 ft 10 in) | Leuven Bears | (Belgium) |
| F | 22 | Vincent Kesteloot | 22 – 23 March 1995 | 2.02 m (6 ft 8 in) | Oostende | (Belgium) |

Head coach

- (Belgium) Eddy Casteels

Assistant coach(es)

- (Belgium) Thierry Declercq
- (Belgium) Roel Moors

Legend

- (C) Team captain
- Club – describes last
  club before the tournament
- Age – describes age
  on 31 August 2017

=== Great Britain ===
Great Britain announced its 12-man squad for EuroBasket 2017 on 24 August 2017.

Great Britain men's national basketball team – EuroBasket 2017 roster
Players
Coaches

| Pos. | No. | Name | Age – Date of birth | Height | Club | Ctr. |
|---|---|---|---|---|---|---|
| G | 0 | Jules Dang Akodo | 21 – May 2, 1996 | 1.88 m (6 ft 2 in) | Burgos 2002 | (Spain) |
| G | 1 | Kyle Johnson | 28 – December 31, 1988 | 1.95 m (6 ft 5 in) | London Lightning | (Canada) |
| G | 3 | Ben Mockford | 28 – August 18, 1989 | 1.88 m (6 ft 2 in) | Palma | (Spain) |
| G | 4 | Andrew Lawrence | 27 – June 4, 1990 | 1.88 m (6 ft 2 in) | Champagne Basket | (France) |
| G | 5 | Teddy Okereafor | 24 – November 11, 1992 | 1.93 m (6 ft 4 in) | Pistoia | (Italy) |
| F | 10 | Daniel Clark | 28 – September 16, 1988 | 2.10 m (6 ft 11 in) | Murcia | (Spain) |
| F | 11 | Gareth Murray | 32 – September 23, 1984 | 2.01 m (6 ft 7 in) | Glasgow Rocks | (United Kingdom) |
| C | 13 | Eric Boateng | 31 – November 20, 1985 | 2.08 m (6 ft 10 in) | Blois Basket | (France) |
| PG | 19 | Luke Nelson | 22 – June 29, 1995 | 1.91 m (6 ft 3 in) | UC Irvine Anteaters | (United States) |
| F | 20 | Kieron Achara | 34 – July 3, 1983 | 2.08 m (6 ft 10 in) | Glasgow Rocks | (United Kingdom) |
| C | 26 | Olaseni, Gabe | 25 – December 29, 1991 | 2.11 m (6 ft 11 in) | Orléans | (France) |
| G | 44 | Kofi Josephs | 25 – September 13, 1991 | 1.98 m (6 ft 6 in) | Hertener Löwen | (Germany) |

Head coach

- (United States) Joe Prunty

Assistant coach(es)

- (United Kingdom) Nate Reinking
- (Spain) Alberto Lorenzo
- (United States) Kenny Graves
- (United Kingdom) Jamie Smith

Legend

- (C) Team captain
- Club – describes last
  club before the tournament
- Age – describes age
  on 31 August 2017

=== Latvia ===
Latvia men's national basketball team – EuroBasket 2017 roster
Players
Coaches

| Pos. | No. | Name | Age – Date of birth | Height | Club | Ctr. |
|---|---|---|---|---|---|---|
| F/C | 6 | Kristaps Porziņģis | 22 – 2 February 1995 | 2.21 m (7 ft 3 in) | New York Knicks | (United States) |
| SG | 7 | Jānis Blūms (C) | 35 – 20 April 1982 | 1.91 m (6 ft 3 in) | BK VEF Rīga | (Latvia) |
| F/C | 8 | Dāvis Bertāns | 24 – 12 November 1992 | 2.08 m (6 ft 10 in) | San Antonio Spurs | (United States) |
| SG | 9 | Dairis Bertāns | 27 – 9 September 1989 | 1.92 m (6 ft 4 in) | Darüşşafaka S.K. | (Turkey) |
| SF | 10 | Jānis Timma | 25 – 2 July 1992 | 2.01 m (6 ft 7 in) | BC Zenit Saint Petersburg | (Russia) |
| PF | 11 | Rolands Šmits | 22 – 25 June 1995 | 2.07 m (6 ft 9 in) | Baloncesto Fuenlabrada | (Spain) |
| G/F | 12 | Kristaps Janičenoks | 34 – 14 March 1983 | 1.96 m (6 ft 5 in) | BK Ventspils | (Latvia) |
| PG | 13 | Jānis Strēlnieks | 27 – 1 September 1989 | 1.91 m (6 ft 3 in) | Brose Bamberg | (Germany) |
| G | 21 | Aigars Šķēle | 24 – 4 December 1992 | 1.92 m (6 ft 4 in) | BK Ventspils | (Latvia) |
| PF | 24 | Andrejs Gražulis | 24 – 21 July 1993 | 2.02 m (6 ft 8 in) | BK Ventspils | (Latvia) |
| G/F | 31 | Žanis Peiners | 27 – 2 August 1990 | 2.04 m (6 ft 8 in) | PAOK BC | (Greece) |
| C | 33 | Mārtiņš Meiers | 26 – 30 March 1991 | 2.08 m (6 ft 10 in) | BK VEF Rīga | (Latvia) |

Head coach

- (Latvia) Ainars Bagatskis

Assistant coach(es)

- (Latvia) Arnis Vecvagars
- (Latvia) Artūrs Visockis-Rubenis

Legend

- Club – describes last
  club before the tournament
- Age – describes age
  on 31 August 2017

=== Russia ===
The following is the Russia roster in the men's basketball tournament of the 2017 EuroBasket.

Russia men's national basketball team – 2017 EuroBasket roster
Players
Coaches

| Pos. | No. | Name | Age – Date of birth | Height | Club | Ctr. |
|---|---|---|---|---|---|---|
| SG | 1 | Alexey Shved | 28 – 16 December 1988 | 1.98 m (6 ft 6 in) | Khimki | (Russia) |
| SG | 4 | Evgeny Baburin | 30 – 4 July 1987 | 1.90 m (6 ft 3 in) | Lokomotiv Kuban | (Russia) |
| G | 7 | Vitaly Fridzon | 31 – 14 October 1985 | 1.95 m (6 ft 5 in) | CSKA Moscow | (Russia) |
| PF | 8 | Vladimir Ivlev | 27 – 28 February 1990 | 2.07 m (6 ft 9 in) | Lokomotiv Kuban | (Russia) |
| SF | 11 | Semen Antonov | 28 – 18 July 1989 | 2.02 m (6 ft 8 in) | CSKA Moscow | (Russia) |
| PF | 12 | Andrey Zubkov | 26 – 29 June 1991 | 2.05 m (6 ft 9 in) | Lokomotiv Kuban | (Russia) |
| PG | 13 | Dmitry Khvostov | 28 – 21 August 1989 | 1.90 m (6 ft 3 in) | Lokomotiv Kuban | (Russia) |
| C | 15 | Timofey Mozgov | 31 – July 16, 1986 | 2.16 m (7 ft 1 in) | Los Angeles Lakers | (United States) |
| PF | 20 | Andrey Vorontsevich | 30 – 17 July 1987 | 2.07 m (6 ft 9 in) | CSKA Moscow | (Russia) |
| SG | 22 | Dmitry Kulagin | 25 – 1 July 1992 | 1.97 m (6 ft 6 in) | Lokomotiv Kuban | (Russia) |
| PG | 30 | Mikhail Kulagin | 23 – 4 August 1994 | 1.92 m (6 ft 4 in) | CSKA Moscow | (Russia) |
| SF | 41 | Nikita Kurbanov | 30 – 5 October 1986 | 2.02 m (6 ft 8 in) | CSKA Moscow | (Russia) |

Head coach

- (Russia) Sergei Bazarevich

Assistant coach(es)

- (Serbia) Saša Grujić
- (Russia) Boris Sokolovskiy
- (Russia) Sergei Bykov

Legend

- Club – describes last
  club before the tournament
- Age – describes age
  on 31 August 2017

=== Serbia ===
The following is the Serbia roster for the EuroBasket 2017

Serbia men's national basketball team – EuroBasket 2017 roster
Players
Coaches

| Pos. | No. | Name | Age – Date of birth | Height | Club | Ctr. |
|---|---|---|---|---|---|---|
| PF | 6 | Milan Mačvan (C) | 27 – November 16, 1989 | 2.06 m (6 ft 9 in) | Olimpia Milano | (Italy) |
| SG | 7 | Bogdan Bogdanović | 25 – August 18, 1992 | 1.98 m (6 ft 6 in) | Fenerbahçe | (Turkey) |
| F | 11 | Vladimir Lučić | 28 – June 17, 1989 | 2.04 m (6 ft 8 in) | Bayern Munich | (Germany) |
| SG | 12 | Dragan Milosavljević | 28 – May 11, 1989 | 1.98 m (6 ft 6 in) | Alba Berlin | (Germany) |
| PF | 14 | Stefan Birčević | 27 – December 13, 1989 | 2.10 m (6 ft 11 in) | Partizan | (Serbia) |
| C | 15 | Vladimir Štimac | 29 – September 25, 1987 | 2.11 m (6 ft 11 in) | Beşiktaş J.K. | (Turkey) |
| G/F | 19 | Branko Lazić | 28 – January 12, 1989 | 1.95 m (6 ft 5 in) | Crvena zvezda | (Serbia) |
| PG | 22 | Vasilije Micić | 23 – January 13, 1994 | 1.95 m (6 ft 5 in) | Tofaş | (Turkey) |
| G/F | 23 | Marko Gudurić | 22 – March 8, 1995 | 1.99 m (6 ft 6 in) | Crvena zvezda | (Serbia) |
| G | 24 | Stefan Jović | 26 – November 3, 1990 | 1.98 m (6 ft 6 in) | Crvena zvezda | (Serbia) |
| C | 32 | Ognjen Kuzmić | 27 – May 16, 1990 | 2.13 m (7 ft 0 in) | Crvena zvezda | (Serbia) |
| C | 51 | Boban Marjanović | 29 – August 15, 1988 | 2.21 m (7 ft 3 in) | Detroit Pistons | (United States) |

Head coach

- (Serbia) Aleksandar Đorđević

Assistant coach(es)

- (Serbia) Miroslav Nikolić
- (Serbia) Jovica Antonić
- (Serbia) Milan Minić

Legend

- (C) Team captain
- Club – describes last
  club before the tournament
- Age – describes age
  on 31 August 2017

=== Turkey ===
The following is the Turkey roster in the men's basketball tournament of the 2017 EuroBasket.

Turkey men's national basketball team – EuroBasket 2017 roster
Players
Coaches

| Pos. | No. | Name | Age – Date of birth | Height | Club | Ctr. |
|---|---|---|---|---|---|---|
| SF | 2 | Erkan Veyseloğlu | 34 – 13 March 1983 | 2.00 m (6 ft 7 in) | Beşiktaş | (Turkey) |
| PG | 4 | Doğuş Balbay | 28 – 21 January 1989 | 1.85 m (6 ft 1 in) | Anadolu Efes | (Turkey) |
| SG | 5 | Sinan Güler | 33 – 8 November 1983 | 1.92 m (6 ft 4 in) | Galatasaray | (Turkey) |
| SF | 6 | Cedi Osman | 22 – 8 April 1995 | 2.03 m (6 ft 8 in) | Anadolu Efes | (Turkey) |
| PF | 7 | Barış Hersek | 29 – 26 March 1988 | 2.08 m (6 ft 10 in) | Fenerbahçe | (Turkey) |
| C | 9 | Semih Erden | 31 – 28 July 1986 | 2.13 m (7 ft 0 in) | Darüşşafaka | (Turkey) |
| SG | 10 | Melih Mahmutoğlu | 27 – 12 May 1990 | 1.91 m (6 ft 3 in) | Fenerbahçe | (Turkey) |
| C | 19 | Furkan Aldemir | 26 – 8 July 1991 | 2.08 m (6 ft 10 in) | Darüşşafaka | (Turkey) |
| C | 21 | Sertaç Şanlı | 26 – 1 January 1991 | 2.13 m (7 ft 0 in) | Beşiktaş | (Turkey) |
| SG | 22 | Furkan Korkmaz | 20 – 24 July 1997 | 2.01 m (6 ft 7 in) | Banvit | (Turkey) |
| PG | 25 | Kenan Sipahi | 22 – 26 May 1995 | 1.97 m (6 ft 6 in) | Beşiktaş | (Turkey) |
| SG | 61 | Göksenin Köksal | 26 – 8 January 1991 | 1.97 m (6 ft 6 in) | Galatasaray | (Turkey) |

Head coach

- (Turkey) Ufuk Sarıca

Assistant coach(es)

- (Turkey) Ertuğrul Erdoğan
- (Turkey) Erdem Can
- (Turkey) Arda Demirbağ

Legend

- Club – describes last
  club before the tournament
- Age – describes age
  on 31 August 2017

== See also ==
- EuroBasket 2015 squads
- EuroBasket 2022 squads
