= Romania men's national basketball team =

Men's national basketball team representing Romania

Romania
- FIBA ranking: 62 (1 September 2026)
- Joined FIBA: 1932 (co-founders)
- FIBA zone: FIBA Europe
- National federation: FRB
- Coach: Jonah Herscu
- Nickname: Tricolorii (The Tricolours)

Olympic Games
- Appearances: 1 (1952)
- Medals: None

FIBA World Cup
- Appearances: None

EuroBasket
- Appearances: 18
- Medals: None
Home	Away

First international
- Switzerland 42–9 Romania (Geneva, Switzerland; 2 May 1935)

Biggest win
- Wales 50–164 Romania (Hagen, West Germany; 15 May 1975)

Biggest defeat
- Russia 115–45 Romania (Moscow, Russia; 28 February 1998)

The Romania men's national basketball team (Romanian: Echipa națională de baschet a României) represents Romania in international basketball competition. The team is administered by the Romanian Basketball Federation (FRB).

Romania has qualified for the EuroBasket 18 times throughout their history. Their best tournament results occurred in 1957 and 1967 respectively, where they finished fifth. The national team has also appeared at the Olympic Games once, in 1952. However, Romania has yet to clinch qualification for their first trip to the FIBA World Cup.

== History ==
=== EuroBasket 1935 ===
At the first European Championship in Geneva, the Romania national team finished in last place in the then ten team tournament. Losing all three of their matches; 42-9 to Switzerland, 66-23 to France, and 24-17 to Hungary.

=== EuroBasket 1947 ===
Romania returned to the European championship twelve years later in Prague, for the EuroBasket 1947. Romania finished with a record of 1-2 after the preliminary round, which eliminated them from championship contention but they earned their first ever EuroBasket victory against the Netherlands. The Romanians added two more in the classification semifinal, as they defeated Austria and Albania. This put them in a classification match against Italy for 9th and 10th place, which Romania lost 55-39. The national team thus placed tenth again, but this time they had outranked four teams to do so, due to the expansion of the tournament to 14.

=== EuroBasket 1951 ===
The Romanian national team entered the EuroBasket 1951 in Paris, but withdrew before any games were played, so official records gave them three preliminary round losses, each with a score of 2-0.

=== 1952 Summer Olympics ===
Romania managed to qualify for the 1952 Summer Olympics in Helsinki, where the national team finished 23rd. It was the first and only time they qualified for the Olympic Basketball Tournament.

=== EuroBasket 1953 ===
The EuroBasket 1953 in Moscow was the next European tournament in which the Romanians actually played. They finished in 3rd place in their preliminary round group with a 1-2 record and advanced to the classification rounds. They won 3 of their 4 games there, finishing in a three-way tie for the top spot of the group. They lost out on the tiebreaker though and were relegated to the 13th-16th place semifinals. Winning that game and their next, the Romanians finished in 13th place of the 17 teams in the tournament.

=== EuroBasket 1955 ===
Romania was much more successful two years later, at the EuroBasket 1955 in Budapest. A preliminary round loss to the global power house Soviet Union mattered little, as the national team won their other three preliminary matches against Sweden, Switzerland and Luxembourg to take second place in the group behind the Soviets to advance to the final round. There, they won games against Poland and Yugoslavia to finish 2-5 in the final round to take 7th place in the 18-team tournament.

=== EuroBasket 1957 ===
Romania came within a single point of winning their preliminary pool at EuroBasket 1957 in Sofia, losing to Hungary in the narrow match. They beat their other two opponents Belgium and Finland to finish in second place in the pool to advance into the final round. There, they matched up again with Hungary, but the game wasn't as close as the Hungarians cruised to a 76-61 victory. The national team also lost to the other three pool winners, to finish with a 3-4 record to end the tournament in 5th place.

=== Later years ===
The team repeated its most successful campaign at the EuroBasket 1967 when it finished 5th again. The following years, the team had some successful performances but after 1987, it ceded completely from Europe's elite events. After 30 years of absence, Romania returned to the EuroBasket in 2017 when the country gained hosting rights alongside Finland, Israel and Turkey. However, the national team ended its participation with five losses in its five games played.

=== EuroBasket 2022 qualification ===
After defeating both Slovakia and Cyprus twice, the Tricolorii advanced to the final qualification round where they came short of their second EuroBasket qualification since 1987. The team was coached by Tudor Costescu.

== Competitive record ==
=== FIBA World Cup ===
World Cup					Qualification		
Year	Position	Pld	W	L	Pld	W	L
(Argentina) 1950	Did not enter				Did not enter		
(Brazil) 1954	Did not qualify				EuroBasket served as qualifiers		
(Chile) 1959	Did not qualify				EuroBasket served as qualifiers		
(Brazil) 1963	Did not qualify				EuroBasket served as qualifiers		
(Uruguay) 1967	Did not qualify				EuroBasket served as qualifiers		
(Socialist Federal Republic of Yugoslavia) 1970	Did not qualify				EuroBasket served as qualifiers		
(Puerto Rico) 1974	Did not qualify				EuroBasket served as qualifiers		
(Philippines) 1978	Did not qualify				EuroBasket served as qualifiers		
(Colombia) 1982	Did not qualify				EuroBasket served as qualifiers		
(Spain) 1986	Did not enter				Did not enter		
(Argentina) 1990	Did not enter				Did not enter		
(Canada) 1994	Did not qualify				EuroBasket served as qualifiers		
(Greece) 1998	Did not qualify				EuroBasket served as qualifiers		
(United States) 2002	Did not qualify				EuroBasket served as qualifiers		
(Japan) 2006	Did not qualify				EuroBasket served as qualifiers		
(Turkey) 2010	Did not qualify				EuroBasket served as qualifiers		
(Spain) 2014	Did not qualify				EuroBasket served as qualifiers		
(China) 2019	Did not qualify				6	2	4
(Philippines) (Japan) (Indonesia) 2023	Did not qualify				4	0	4
(Qatar) 2027	Did not qualify				14	8	6
(France) 2031	To be determined				To be determined		
Total	0/20				24	10	14

=== Olympic Games ===
Olympic Games					Qualifying		
Year	Position	Pld	W	L	Pld	W	L
(Nazi Germany) 1936	Did not enter						
(United Kingdom) 1948	Did not enter						
(Finland) 1952	23rd	2	0	2			
(Australia) 1956	Did not qualify						
(Italy) 1960	Did not enter				Did not enter		
(Japan) 1964	Did not enter				Did not enter		
(Mexico) 1968	Did not enter				Did not enter		
(West Germany) 1972	Did not enter				Did not enter		
(Canada) 1976	Did not enter				Did not enter		
(Soviet Union) 1980	Did not enter				Did not enter		
(United States) 1984	Did not enter				Did not enter		
(South Korea) 1988	Did not enter				Did not enter		
(Spain) 1992	Did not qualify				5	2	3
(United States) 1996	Did not qualify				Did not qualify		
(Australia) 2000	Did not qualify				Did not qualify		
(Greece) 2004	Did not qualify				Did not qualify		
(China) 2008	Did not qualify				Did not qualify		
(United Kingdom) 2012	Did not qualify				Did not qualify		
(Brazil) 2016	Did not qualify				Did not qualify		
(Japan) 2020	Did not qualify				Did not qualify		
(France) 2024	Did not qualify				Did not qualify		
(United States) 2028	To be determined				To be determined		
Total	1/21	2	0	2	5	2	3

=== EuroBasket ===
EuroBasket					Qualification		
Year	Position	Pld	W	L	Pld	W	L
(Switzerland) 1935	10th	3	0	3			
(Latvia) 1937	Did not enter						
(Lithuania) 1939	Did not enter						
(Switzerland) 1946	Did not enter						
(Czechoslovakia) 1947	10th	6	3	3			
(Egypt) 1949	Did not enter						
(France) 1951	18th	3	0	3			
(Soviet Union) 1953	13th	9	6	3			
(Hungary) 1955	7th	11	5	6			
(Bulgaria) 1957	5th	10	5	5			
(Turkey) 1959	8th	8	2	6			
(Socialist Federal Republic of Yugoslavia) 1961	7th	8	6	2			
(Poland) 1963	11th	9	4	5	Direct qualification		
(Soviet Union) 1965	13th	9	4	5	Direct qualification		
(Finland) 1967	5th	9	6	3	Direct qualification		
(Italy) 1969	9th	7	4	3	4	3	1
(West Germany) 1971	8th	7	3	4	4	3	1
(Spain) 1973	9th	7	3	4	Direct qualification		
(Socialist Federal Republic of Yugoslavia) 1975	11th	7	1	6	10	9	1
(Belgium) 1977	Did not qualify				5	2	3
(Italy) 1979	Did not qualify				5	1	4
(Czechoslovakia) 1981	Did not qualify				5	3	2
(France) 1983	Did not qualify				12	4	8
(West Germany) 1985	10th	7	2	5	12	7	5
(Greece) 1987	12th	7	0	7	12	8	4
(Socialist Federal Republic of Yugoslavia) 1989	Did not enter				Did not enter		
(Italy) 1991	Did not qualify				9	2	7
(Germany) 1993	Did not qualify				9	3	6
(Greece) 1995	Did not qualify				6	4	2
(Spain) 1997	Did not qualify				16	4	12
(France) 1999	Did not qualify				13	2	11
(Turkey) 2001	Did not qualify				5	3	2
(Sweden) 2003	Did not qualify				21	11	10
(Serbia and Montenegro) 2005	Division B				4	1	3
(Spain) 2007	Division B				8	6	2
(Poland) 2009	Division B				8	3	5
(Lithuania) 2011	Division B				8	4	4
(Slovenia) 2013	Did not qualify				8	1	7
(France) (Croatia) (Germany) (Latvia) 2015	Did not qualify				10	5	5
(Finland) (Israel) (Romania) (Turkey) 2017	23rd	5	0	5	Qualified as co-host		
(Czech Republic) (Georgia (country)) (Italy) (Germany) 2022	Did not qualify				14	7	7
(Cyprus) (Finland) (Poland) (Latvia) 2025	Did not qualify				14	8	6
(Estonia) (Greece) (Slovenia) (Spain) 2029	To be determined				In progress		
Total	18/42	132	54	78	222	104	118

== Results and fixtures ==
Win Loss

=== 2025 ===
27 November 2025 2027 FIBA World Cup qualifiers – 1st round	Greece	91–64	Romania	Thessaloniki, Greece
18:30 (UTC+2)	Scoring by quarter: 26–12, 19–17, 23–15, 23–20
	Pts: Larentzakis 18; Rebs: Samodurov 7 Asts: Larentzakis, Mitrou-Long 6	Boxscore	Pts: Măciucă 13; Rebs: Cățe 8 Asts: Russell 8	Arena: Nick Galis Hall; Attendance: 4,675; Referees: Luis Castillo (ESP), Geert Jacobs (BEL), Siniša Prpa (SRB)

30 November 2025 2027 FIBA World Cup qualifiers – 1st round	Romania	75–80	Montenegro	Pitești, Romania
19:00 (UTC+2)	Scoring by quarter: 17–26, 17–23, 22–16, 19–15
	Pts: Russell 20; Rebs: Diculescu 9 Asts: Russell 4	Boxscore	Pts: Perry 16; Rebs: Nikolić 6 Asts: Perry 10	Arena: Pitești Arena; Attendance: 3,473; Referees: Mārtiņš Kozlovskis (LAT), Dariusz Zapolski (POL), Çisil Güngör (TUR)

=== 2026 ===
27 February 2026 2027 FIBA World Cup qualifiers – 1st round	Portugal	99–82	Romania	Coimbra, Portugal
19:00 (UTC+0)	Scoring by quarter: 25–12, 29–34, 21–15, 24–21
	Pts: Brito 32; Rebs: Williams 8 Asts: Brito 4	Boxscore	Pts: Nicolescu 25; Rebs: Cățe 10; Asts: Russell	Arena: Pavilhão Multidesportos Dr. Mário Mexia; Attendance: 1,828; Referees: Michał Proc (POL), Valentin Oliot (FRA), Mehmet Şahin (TUR)

2 March 2026 2027 FIBA World Cup qualifiers – 1st round	Romania	101–96	Portugal	Pitești, Romania
19:00 (UTC+2)	Scoring by quarter: 27–22, 23–31, 26–20, 25–23
	Pts: Russell 29; Rebs: Cățe 9 Asts: Russell 6	Boxscore	Pts: Williams 33; Rebs: Monteiro 5 Asts: Da Silva, Ventura 4	Arena: Pitești Arena; Attendance: 2,280; Referees: Mihkel Männiste (EST), Josip Jurčević (CRO), Valerio Grigioni (ITA)

2 July 2026 2027 FIBA World Cup qualifiers – 1st round	Romania	73–66	Greece	Oradea, Romania
19:00 (UTC+3)	Scoring by quarter: 16–18, 19–20, 16–20, 22–8
	Pts: Russell 20; Rebs: Uta 9 Asts: Tohătan 6	Boxscore	Pts: Larentzakis 16; Rebs: Papanikolaou 10; Asts: Papanikolaou, Toliopoulos 5	Arena: Oradea Arena; Attendance: 3,001; Referees: Martin Vulić (CRO), Edgard Ceccarelli (FRA), Branimir Galić (CRO)

5 July 2026 2027 FIBA World Cup qualifiers – 1st round	Montenegro	65–64	Romania	Bar, Montenegro
20:30 (UTC+2)	Scoring by quarter: 17–14, 11–15, 27–21, 10–14
	Pts: Drobnjak 13; Rebs: Hadžibegović 12; Asts: Kljajić 5	Boxscore	Pts: Russell 17; Rebs: Cățe 8 Asts: five players 2	Arena: Topolica Sport Hall; Attendance: 2,055; Referees: Michał Proc (POL), Ritvars Helmšteins (LAT), Sergii Zashchuk (UKR)

27 August 2026 EuroBasket 2029 pre-qualifiers – 2nd round	Denmark	78–89	Romania	Farum, Denmark
18:30 (UTC+2)	Scoring by quarter: 10–22, 23–16, 20–27, 25–24
	Pts: Dibba 21; Rebs: Dibba, Pedersen 7 Asts: Lundberg 6	Boxscore	Pts: Russell 34; Rebs: Cățe 8 Asts: Diculescu, Russell 6	Arena: Farum Arena; Attendance: 1,375; Referees: Valerio Grigioni (ITA), Tomasz Łangowski (POL), Pierre Landy (FRA)

30 August 2026 EuroBasket 2029 pre-qualifiers – 2nd round	Romania	86–103	Bulgaria	Tulcea, Romania
18:00 (UTC+3)	Scoring by quarter: 32–34, 16–23, 18–20, 20–26
	Pts: Russell 22; Rebs: Cățe 8 Asts: Russell 6	Boxscore	Pts: Vezenkov 36; Rebs: Mladenov 11; Asts: Gibson 9	Arena: Danubius Arena; Attendance: 4,603; Referees: Zafer Yılmaz (TUR), Ilias Kounelles (CYP), Rainis Värv (EST)

29 November 2026 EuroBasket 2029 pre-qualifiers – 2nd round	Romania	vs.	Denmark	Timișoara, Romania
18:00 (UTC+2)
		Boxscore		Arena: Constantin Jude Sports Hall

=== 2027 ===
25 February 2027 EuroBasket 2029 pre-qualifiers – 2nd round	Bulgaria	vs.	Romania	Bulgaria
--:-- (UTC+2)
		Boxscore

== Team ==
=== Current roster ===
Roster for the EuroBasket 2029 Pre-Qualifiers matches on 27 and 30 August 2026 against Denmark and Bulgaria.

Romania men's national basketball team roster
Players
Coaches

Pos.	No.	Name	Age – Date of birth	Height	Club	Ctr.
PG	0	Tudor Somacescu	21 – 15 June 2005	1.92 m (6 ft 4 in)	Argeș Pitești	(Romania)
PG	1	Lucas Tohătan	27 – 15 March 1999	1.87 m (6 ft 2 in)	CS Vâlcea 1924	(Romania)
PG	2	Daron Russell	28 – 6 May 1998	1.80 m (5 ft 11 in)	U-BT Cluj-Napoca	(Romania)
G/F	3	Dragoș Diculescu	27 – 25 August 1999	1.96 m (6 ft 5 in)	Köping UBBK	(Sweden)
G/F	8	Nandor Kuti	29 – 10 January 1997	1.96 m (6 ft 5 in)	Dinamo	(Romania)
SF	9	Dragoș Lungu	21 – 2 September 2004	1.98 m (6 ft 6 in)	Fresno State Bulldogs	(United States)
SF	10	Bogdan Nicolescu (C)	29 – 3 January 1997	1.99 m (6 ft 6 in)	U-BT Cluj-Napoca	(Romania)
PF	11	Ștefan Grasu	23 – 16 February 2003	2.00 m (6 ft 7 in)	Dinamo	(Romania)
PF	12	Luca Colceag	23 – 22 July 2003	2.06 m (6 ft 9 in)	Rapid	(Romania)
F/C	15	Emanuel Cățe	29 – 30 July 1997	2.06 m (6 ft 9 in)	Murcia	(Spain)
C	44	Rares Uta	28 – 24 December 1997	2.10 m (6 ft 11 in)	CS Vâlcea 1924	(Romania)
SG	77	Mihai Măciucă	26 – 25 May 2000	1.96 m (6 ft 5 in)	Corona Brașov	(Romania)

Head coach

- (United States) Jonah Herscu

Assistant coach(es)

- (Romania) Ionut Bâscoveanu
- (United States) Ryan Kershaw
- (Romania) Mihăiță Săftel

Legend

- (C) Team captain
- Club – describes last
  club before the competition
- Age – describes age
  on 27 August 2026

=== Depth chart ===
Pos.	Starting 5	Bench 1	Bench 2
C	Emanuel Cățe	Rares Uta
PF	Bogdan Nicolescu	Luca Colceag
SF	Nandor Kuti	Ștefan Grasu	Dragoș Lungu
SG	Dragoș Diculescu	Mihai Măciucă
PG	Daron Russell	Lucas Tohătan	Tudor Somacescu

== Head coach position ==
- (Romania) C. O. Lecca – (1935)
- (Romania) C. Virgolici – (1947)
- (Romania) Alexandru Popescu – (1952–1953)
- (Romania) Vasile Popescu – (1955–1957)
- (Romania) Constantin Herold – (1959–1961)
- (Romania) Vasile Popescu – (1963–1965)
- (Romania) Alexandru Popescu – (1967–1973)
- (Romania) Mihai Nedef – (1975)
- (Romania) Gheorghe Novac – (1985–1987)
- (Romania) Costel Cernat – (2008–2009)
- (Romania) Daniel Calancea – (2009)
- (United States) John Neumann – (2010–2012)
- (Bosnia and Herzegovina) Mladen Ostojic – (2012)
- (Romania) Marcel Tenter – (2013–2017)
- (North Macedonia) Zare Markovski – (2017–2018)
- (Romania) Tudor Costescu – (2018–2021)
- (Bosnia and Herzegovina) Dragan Petričević – (2021–2023)
- (Israel) Mickey Gorka – (2023)
- (Romania) Mihai Silvășan – (2024–2026)
- (United States) Jonah Herscu – (2026–present)

== Notable players ==
- Andrei Folbert – First Romanian Basketball "Maestru Emerit Al Sportului"
- Gheorghe Mureșan – First Romanian to play in the NBA
- Constantin Popa
- Horia Demian
- Ernie Grunfeld

== Past rosters ==
1935 EuroBasket: finished 10th among 10 teams

3 Nae Alexandrescu, 4 Balteanu, 5 O.Belitoreanu, 6 M.Bercus, 7 E.Dumitrescu, 8 Nicu Grozavescu, 9 Samy Grunstein, 10 C.Riegler (Coach: C. O. Lecca)

1947 EuroBasket: finished 10th among 14 teams

3 Constantin Herold, 4 N.Badulescu, 5 H.Dlugos, 6 S.Ferencz, 7 H.Kevorkian, 8 P.Marossi, 9 Alexandru Popescu, 10 S.Sadeanu, 11 Gh.Teodorescu, 12 I.Vulescu, 13 Vasile Popescu, 14 A.Neagu, 21 C.Babaliescu (Coach: C.Virgolici)

1952 Olympic Games: finished 23rd among 23 teams

3 Cornel Călugăreanu, 5 Grigore Costescu, 6 Emanoil Răducanu, 7 Andrei Folbert, 8 Ladislau Mokos, 9 Liviu Naghy, 10 Mihai Nedef, 11 Cezar Niculescu, 12 Dan Niculescu, 13 Adrian Petroșanu, 15 Vasile Popescu, 16 Gheorghe Constantinide (Coach: Alexandru Popescu)

1953 EuroBasket: finished 13th among 17 teams

3 Mihai Nedef, 4 Cezar Niculescu, 5 Trajan Lita, 6 Andrei Folbert, 7 Emanoil Răducanu, 8 Dan Niculescu, 9 Adrian Petroșanu, 10 Alexandru Fodor, 11 Corneliu Calugareanu, 12 Mihai Erdogh, 13 Liviu Naghy, 14 Vasile Kadar (Coach: Alexandru Popescu)

1955 EuroBasket: finished 7th among 18 teams

3 E.Ganea, 4 R.Popovici, 5 Mihai Nedef, 6 Andrei Folbert, 7 Emanoil Răducanu, 8 Dan Niculescu, 9 Emil Niculescu, 10 Alexandru Fodor, 11 Mihai Erdogh, 12 Marian Spiridon, 13 Liviu Naghy, 14 Vasile Kadar, 15 Corneliu Calugareanu (Coach: Vasile Popescu)

1957 EuroBasket: finished 5th among 16 teams

3 Grigore Costescu, 4 A.Borbely, 5 Mihai Nedef, 6 Andrei Folbert, 7 Emanoil Răducanu, 8 Alexandru Berecky, 9 Emil Niculescu, 10 Alexandru Fodor, 11 Mihai Erdogh, 12 Armand Nováček, 13 Liviu Naghy, 14 A Koukouch (Coach: Alexandru Popescu)

1959 EuroBasket: finished 8th among 17 teams

3 Feodor Nedelea, 4 Armand Nováček, 5 Grigore Costescu, 6 Andrei Folbert, 7 Mihai Nedef, 8 Emeric Vizi, 9 Emil Niculescu, 10 Alexandru Fodor, 11 Dragos Nosievici, 12 Cristian Popescu, 13 Ludovic Toth, 14 Jzidor Milelman (Coach: Constantin Herold)

1961 EuroBasket: finished 7th among 19 teams

4 Aurel Popovici, 5 Emil Niculescu, 6 Horatiu Giurgiu, 7 Mihai Nedef, 8 Nicolae Viciu, 9 Mihai Albu, 10 Pavel Visner, 11 Dragos Nosievici, 12 Cristian Popescu, 13 Armand Nováček, 14 Horia Demian, 15 Gheorghe Valeriu (Coach: Constantin Herold)

1963 EuroBasket: finished 11th among 16 teams

4 Horia Demian, 5 Emil Niculescu, 6 Marian Spiridon, 7 Mihai Nedef, 8 Mihai Kiss, 9 Mihai Albu, 10 Horatiu Giurgiu, 11 Dragos Nosievici, 12 Cristian Popescu, 13 Pavel Visner, 14 Mircea Cimpeanu, 15 Gheorghe Valeriu (Coach: Vasile Popescu)

1965 EuroBasket: finished 13th among 16 teams

4 Horia Demian, 5 Gheorghe Novac, 6 Marian Spiridon, 7 Mihai Nedef, 8 Nicolae Ionescu, 9 Mihai Albu, 10 Alin Savu, 11 Dragos Nosievici, 12 Cristian Popescu, 13 Armand Nováček, 14 Ekehardt Jekely, 15 Aurel Popovici (Coach: Vasile Popescu)

1967 EuroBasket: finished 5th among 16 teams

4 Adolf Cernea, 5 Gheorghe Novac, 6 Dragos Nosievici, 7 Alin Savu, 8 Ekehardt Jekely, 9 Mihai Albu, 10 Gheorghe Barau, 11 Nicolae Birsan, 12 Cristian Popescu, 13 Titus Tarau, 14 Radu Diaconescu, 15 Horia Demian (Coach: Alexandru Popescu)

1969 EuroBasket: finished 9th among 12 teams

4 Francisc Dikay, 5 Matei Ruhring, 6 Dragos Nosievici, 7 Constantin Dragomirescu, 8 Ekehardt Jekely, 9 Mihai Albu, 10 Petru Czmor, 11 Radu Diaconescu, 12 Gheorghe Novac, 13 Titus Tarau, 14 Mihai Dimancea, 15 Adolf Cernea (Coach: Alexandru Popescu)

1971 EuroBasket: finished 8th among 12 teams

4 Dan Georgescu, 5 Mircea Chivulescu, 6 Nicolae Pirsu, 7 Alin Savu, 8 Dan Niculescu, 9 Mihai Albu, 10 Constantin Dragomirescu, 11 Radu Diaconescu, 12 Gheorghe Cimpeanu, 13 Titus Tarau, 14 Gheorghe Oczelak, 15 Vasile Popa (Coach: Alexandru Popescu)

1973 EuroBasket: finished 9th among 12 teams

4 Gheorghe Cimpeanu, 5 Mircea Chivulescu, 6 Nicolae Pirsu, 7 Nicolae Manaila, 8 Dan Niculescu, 9 Dan Georgescu, 10 Costel Cernat, 11 Radu Diaconescu, 12 Gheorghe Novac, 13 Titus Tarau, 14 Gheorghe Oczelak, 15 Vasile Popa (Coach: Alexandru Popescu)

1975 EuroBasket: finished 11th among 12 teams

4 Dan Georgescu, 5 Georghe Mihuta, 6 Vasile Zdrenghea, 7 Dan Moisescu, 8 Nicolae Pirsu, 9 Dan Niculescu, 10 Costel Cernat, 11 Radu Diaconescu, 12 Gheorghe Novac, 13 Titus Tarau, 14 Gheorghe Oczelak, 15 Vasile Popa (Coach: Mihai Nedef)

1985 EuroBasket: finished 10th among 12 teams

4 Florentin Ermurache, 5 Attila Szabó, 6 Viorel Constantin, 7 Ioan Ionescu, 8 Doru Rădulescu, 9 Dan Niculescu, 10 Costel Cernat, 11 Roman Opsitaru, 12 Anton Netolitzchi, 13 Victor Jacob, 14 Marian Marinache, 15 Alexandru Vinereanu (Coach: Gheorghe Novac)

1987 EuroBasket: finished 12th among 12 teams

4 Florentin Ermurache, 5 Sorin Ardeleanu, 6 Robert Reisenbuchler, 7 Ioan Ionescu, 8 Petre Brănișteanu, 9 Dan Niculescu, 10 Costel Cernat, 11 Andrei Constantin, 12 Anton Netolitzchi, 13 Constantin Popa, 14 Gabriel David, 15 Alexandru Vinereanu (Coach: Gheorghe Novac)

2017 EuroBasket: finished 23rd among 24 teams

4 Andrei Mandache, 6 Catalin Petrisor, 8 Radu Paliciuc, 9 Vlad Moldoveanu, 10 Bogdan Nicolescu, 11 Octavian Calota, 13 Alexandru Olah, 14 Titus Nicoara, 15 Emanuel Cățe, 25 Rolland Torok, 26 Cătălin Baciu, 32 Nandor Kuti (Coach: Marcel Tenter)

== Kit ==
=== Manufacturer ===
- 2014: Ancada
- 2015–2017: Peak
- 2019–present: Spalding

=== Sponsor ===
- 2020–present: Banca Transilvania

== See also ==
- Sport in Romania
- Romania women's national basketball team
- Romania men's national under-20 basketball team
- Romania men's national under-18 basketball team
- Romania men's national under-16 basketball team
- Romania men's national 3x3 team
