= Constantin Herold =

Romanian basketball player (1912–1984)

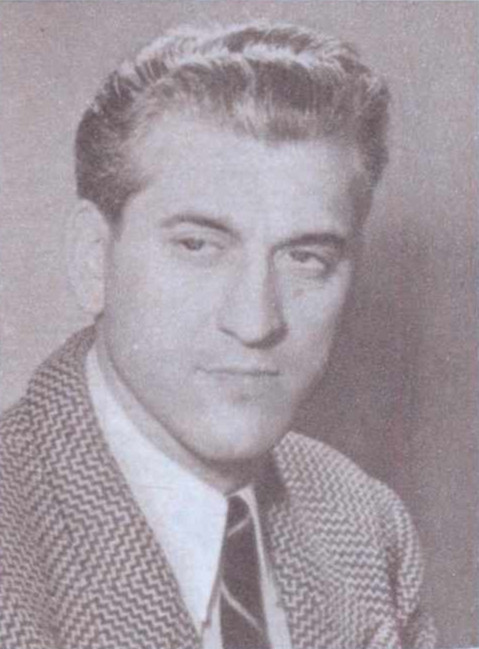

Personal information
- Born: 4 February 1912 Moreni, Prahova County, Kingdom of Romania
- Died: 28 August 1984 (aged 72) Bucharest, Socialist Republic of Romania

Career information
- High school: Saints Peter and Pavel High School (Ploiești); Ioan Meșotă National College (Brașov); Andrei Șaguna National College (Brașov)
- College: ANEFS (1931–1935) (Bucharest)
- Playing career: 1935–1953
- Coaching career: 1950–1968

Career history

Playing
- 1935–1949: Telefon Club București
- 1950–1951: Locomotiva PTT București
- 1952–1953: CCA București

Coaching
- 1950–1951: Locomotiva PTT București
- 1954–1968: CCA București
- 1959–1961: Romania

Career highlights
- As player: 1× Romanian League champion (1951); As coach: 11× Romanian League champion (1951, 1956, 1958, 1959, 1960, 1961, 1962, 1963, 1964, 1966, 1967)

Constantin Herold (4 February 1912 – 28 August 1984) was a Romanian multi-sport athlete who practiced 14 sports throughout his career. He was mostly known for his activity in basketball, where he was a player and coach. On 17 June 2005, he received post-mortem the Honorary Citizen of Moreni title.

== Early life ==
Herold was born on 4 February 1912 in Moreni, Romania from a family of six children. He was drawn to sport as a preschooler, playing football at the M.A.T.I.L.U.S. sports association. At the age of 10, he won a children athletics competition in Moreni, placing first in all five disciplines (shot put, long jump, high jump, sprint run and long-distance running). Later he moved in Ploiești at the "Saints Peter and Pavel" High School where he continued exercising athletics and football, also starting to participate in gymnastics disciplines. In 1926 he moved to Brașov, where he attended the Ioan Meșotă and Andrei Șaguna High Schools, continuing to develop his multi-sport abilities, winning school inter-class decathlon competitions. In 1931, he became a student at the National University of Physical Education and Sport (ANEFS).

== Basketball career ==
Herold played his first basketball game in 1934 for his college team ANEFS at the first ever National University Championship in a 4–27 loss against the University of Law School Bucharest team.

Later he played for Telefon Club București which in 1950 merged with CFR București in order to create Locomotiva PTT București, where Herold was a player-coach, winning the 1951 Romanian League title. He also played 24 games for the national team, including appearances in EuroBasket 1947 where the team finished in 10th position with Herold having a 6.6 average points per game scored. In 1952 he transferred to newly founded club CCA București where he played until 1953 after which he retired from playing and became the team's coach.

He coached CCA București from 1954 until 1968, winning 10 Romanian League titles (7 consecutive) and reaching the semi-finals in the 1960–61 FIBA European Champions Cup. He worked through the years with players such as Andrei Folbert, Mihai Nedef, Liviu Naghy, Emil Niculescu, Alexandru Fodor, Florin Burada, Armand Novacek, Mihai Erdogh, Mihai Dimancea, Ioan Testiban, Theodor Nedelea, Ion Cimpoiaș and Valeriu Gheorghe, who nicknamed him "Uncle", and the press nicknamed the team "The uncle and his nephews" or "The golden CCA".

Herold coached the national team during EuroBasket 1959 (8th place) and EuroBasket 1961 (7th place).

== Multi-sports activity ==
During his years as a student at ANEFS, Herold got a job as a sports instructor at Telefon Club București, where together with other colleagues from the firm he founded the volleyball, basketball and handball teams of the club.

Herold played junior-level football as a goalkeeper alongside Iuliu Bodola at B.M.T.E. Brașov. He made his debut in an official match for the senior team at the age of 15 in a 2–1 loss to Colțea Brașov. He later played for Astra Brașov as a midfielder and forward. He continued his career at Telefon Club București, helping them achieve promotion from the lower leagues of Romanian football to the second division, being the team's top-scorer during the process. He retired from football in 1937.

In his first year as a student at ANEFS he broke the national junior records in the 110 metres hurdles, triple jump and pole vault disciplines at the National University Championships in Timișoara. In 1933, Herold became national champion at 110 metres hurdles, a performance repeated in 1934, when he also won the national decathlon title, establishing national records that would last until 1948. He retired from athletics after he represented Romania in the 1937 Balkan Championship at 110 metres hurdles, where he finished second.

Herold played handball in the 11-a-side handball national team, being part of Romania's squad for the 1937 World Cup in Magdeburg, Germany.

In 1946, he won as player, captain and coach of Romania's national volleyball team the Balkan Championship, played in Bucharest. He played volleyball until the age of 43 at I.C.F.S.

In 1954, Herold received the title of "emeritus master of sports" for his multi-sport activity and in 1966 he received the title of "emeritus coach" for teaching and developing generations of players. Herold practiced and competed in a total of 14 sports disciplines:

- Athletics – school, junior, university and national champion in several events, national junior record breaker (110 metres hurdles, pole, triple jump), national champion in seniors (110 metres hurdles in 1933 and 1934), national decathlon champion (1934), record holder for 14 years in decathlon, member of the national team
- Football – player at B.M.T.E. Brașov, Astra Brașov and Telefon Club București (from the establishment of the club until it reached the second division)
- Handball in 11 – member of the national team and participant in the 1937 World Cup from Germany
- Volleyball – player and captain of the national team
- Basketball – player and captain of the national team
- Shooting sports – the third place in the national rifle championships, with the performance of 391 points out of 400 possible
- Alpine skiing – champion in the military patrol competition
- Rowing – participant in the city championships of Bucharest as part of the Telefon Club București team
- Water polo – goalkeeper at Telefon Club București in the city championship
- Table tennis – trade union champion of the Capital in the mixed doubles event in 1946, together with Mariana Bunescu
- Tennis – played in the second category championship and qualifiers of Bucharest for the C.C.A. and Justice team
- Rugby – player at Telefon Club București
- Fencing – university champion of Bucharest at foil and sabre in 1934
- Gymnastics – member of the model team of ANEFS at the demonstrations of the student camp organized on the occasion of the 1936 Summer Olympics in Berlin.
