= Niculescu =

Niculescu is a Romanian surname. Notable people with the surname include:

- Bogdan Niculescu-Duvăz (1948–2019), politician and architect
- Cezar Niculescu (1927–1981), basketball player
- Claudiu Niculescu (born 1976), soccer player
- Dan Niculescu (1929–1999), basketball player
- Luca Niculescu (born 1971), journalist and diplomat
- Margareta Niculescu (1926–2018), artist, puppeteer, director, teacher, and theater director
- Monica Niculescu (born 1987), tennis player
- Nifon Niculescu (1858–1923), bishop
- Oana Niculescu-Mizil (born 1975), politician
- Paul Niculescu-Mizil (1923–2008), communist politician
- Radu Niculescu (born 1975), soccer player
- Ștefan Niculescu (1927–2008), composer

== See also ==
- Nicolescu
