= Andrei Folbert =

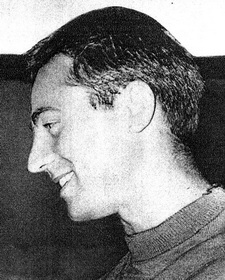

Personal information
- Born: January 6, 1931; Meșendorf, Kingdom of Romania
- Died: September 29, 2003 (aged 72)
- Listed height: 5 ft 10 in (1.78 m)
- Listed weight: 158 lb (72 kg)

Career information
- Playing career: 1944–1972
- Position: Guard
- Number: 6

Career history
- 1944–1946: CAST Team
- 1946–1949: Telecom Team
- 1950–1951: Locomotiva PTT București
- 1952–1956: Steaua București
- 1966–1972: Military Academy

Career highlights
- Captain of the Romanian National Basketball Team for 25 years.; Won 16 Romanian National Championships Titles.; Part of Europe's MVP Team at the European Championship in 1955.; First Romanian basketball "Maestru Emerit al Sportului" in 1961.

Andrei Folbert (Meșendorf, January 6, 1931 – September 9, 2003), nicknamed "The Hope" by his fans and officially known as "The Magician under the boards", was a professional basketball player and captain of the Romanian basketball team for 25 years. As a player and coach he served the basketball magic for over 38 years. Folbert was known throughout his career for being a strong clutch performer. He decided numerous games with his plays. His competitiveness was visible in his prolific talk and well-known work ethic. Being the complete player, characterized by speed, long range shooting skills, astonishing dribbling and perfect ball handling, surprisingly assists and steals, he put his trademark delivering a spectacular game and creating a unique, unforgettable show remembered even after 50 years by the attendance. He is unanimously recognized, as the All Time Best Romanian Basketball Player.

== Career achievements ==
- Captain of the Romanian National Team for 25 years.
- Won 16 Romanian National Championships.
- Part of Europe's MVP Team at the European Championship in 1955.
- MVP of the European Championship in 1955.
- First Romanian basketball "Maestru al Sportului" in 1953.
- First Romanian basketball "Maestru Emerit al Sportului" in 1961.
- Medal "Medalia Muncii" (clasa I) in 1949.
- Order "Meritul Sportiv" (clasa I) in 1969.
- Order "Ordinul Meritul Militar" (clasa I) in 1977.

== Professional player career ==
Andrei Folbert made his sporting debut, playing football for "FC Suter" (Colentina) in 1941. He started to play basketball in 1944 joining the "CAST" team ("Echipa de Baschet a Centrului de Asistenta Sociala Tei"). His official debut as a professional basketball player was in 1945, when he played in the second Bucharest league. During the years 1946–1949, he played for the "Telecom Team" ("P.T.T." or "Telefoane") who in 1950 merged with CFR București, forming Locomotiva PTT București and Folbert won in 1951 his first National Championship Title under the guidance of coach Constantin Herold. Between 1952 and 1966 he played for "Steaua Bucharest" (former "C.C.A." Club) which was called the Romanian Dream Team, winning further 15 National Championships Titles. He finished his player career as a player-coach for the "Military Academy" during 1966–1972. He retired as a player winning 16 National Championships Titles.

In 1946, Andrei Folbert was selected for the Romanian National Basketball Team and remained as captain until 1971. Participates at the Olympic Games in 1952 and European Championships between 1953 and 1972. He was also the winner of the "Coupe de la Liberation" (Cairo, 1956). Gatheres 350 selections in the national team.

He started to coach after 1966 when he was still an active player for the "Military Academy". After, he coached "Steaua Bucharest" Youth Team, until 1982.

Andrei Folbert was the most valuable player Romania had to offer. Giving his unique talent and ability to dribble the ball, he was called by his fans "The Hope" and had the official nickname "The Magician under the boards". "The Magician" was Romania's most prolific player who confirmed as an active player for over 25 years.

In his memory, starting with season 2003–2004 the Romanian National Championship will be called officially: "Campionatul National "Andrei FOLBERT" 2003–2004".

== International Records ==
=== Participations in FIBA Europe competitions ===
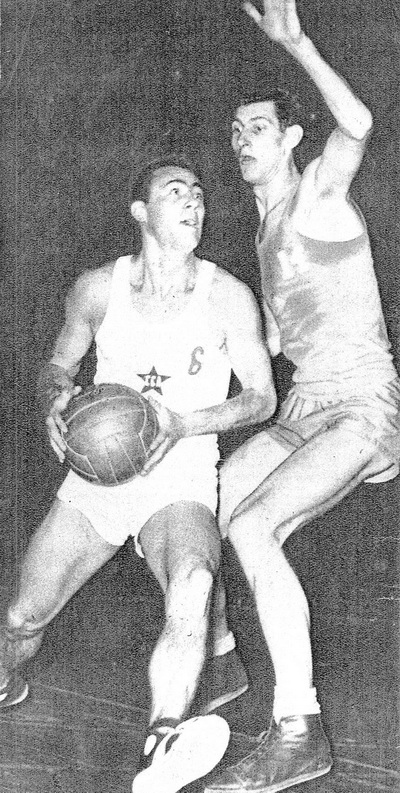
Andrei Folberth passing by Florin Cucos and scoring for a decisive win.

European Championship for Men, Final Round 1959 - PPG: 9.3
Match	PF	Pts
vs. Austria	3	6
vs. Islamic Republic of Iran	3	18
vs. Hungary	3	10
vs. France	5	3
vs. Czechoslovakia	3	13
vs. Belgium	2	6
vs. Bulgaria	0	0
vs. Poland	0	0

European Championship for Men, Final Round 1957 - PPG: 7.3
Match	PF	Pts
vs. Hungary	5	2
vs. Belgium	1	5
vs. Finland	5	2
vs. Poland	5	11
vs. France	2	20
vs. Hungary	5	14
vs. Bulgaria	4	4
vs. Soviet Union	3	2
vs. Yugoslavia	4	6
vs. Czechoslovakia	0	0

European Championship for Men, Final Round 1955 - PPG: 14.7
Match	PF	Pts
vs. Soviet Union	4	8
vs. Sweden	2	16
vs. Switzerland	3	21
vs. Luxembourg	1	0
vs. Poland	3	14
vs. Italy	4	20
vs. Bulgaria	4	5
vs. Yugoslavia	3	34
vs. Soviet Union	4	11
vs. Czechoslovakia	2	13
vs. Hungary	2	20

European Championship for Men, Final Round 1953 - PPG: 10.1
Match	PF	Pts
vs. Italy	4	1
vs. Czechoslovakia	0	2
vs. Switzerland	5	18
vs. Finland	3	1
vs. Belgium	3	3
vs. Lebanon	4	22
vs. Sweden	2	16
vs. Denmark	3	10
vs. Federal Republic of Germany	0	10

=== Participations at Olympic Games ===
Summer Games, 1952 Helsinki - PPG: 12.5 (age: 21)
Phase	Unit	Date	Result	Pts
Group C	Match #3	1952-07-15	CAN 72, ROU 51	13
Group C	Match #5	1952-07-17	ITA 53, ROU 39	12

== Family ==
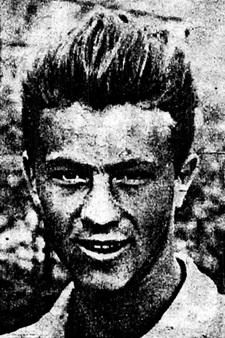
Andrei Folberth as a very young player.

Andrei Folbert was descended from a German family from Meschendorf (Meşendorf), Romania. The initial family name was Folberth, with a "h" at the end, but due to forced political reasons it remained only Folbert.

Andrei had two brothers. The younger brother Nicolae Folberth, worked for the Ford Factory in Romania and for just the simple fact of being German nationality, was deported by the Romanian authorities, after the Second World War to Russia, as a so-called compensation for the war damages. After spending 5 years (1945–1950) in several labor camps in the region of Donbas, he returned to Romania trying to forget the big injustice. Getting his old job back, he was also part of the football team of the Factory. Weakened after the labor years, he died on the football field after he was severely faulted.

Andrei Folberth was married to Ileana-Eva Chiraleu. Ileana was born in 1938 and like Andrei, she was also a professional basketball player. She played for "Oradea", "Vointa Bucuresti" and "Rapid Bucuresti" where she won also the National Championship Title. She took part at the European Championship from 1970 and the "Balcaniada". The Romanian Federation awarded her career (1954–1972) with the "Maestra a Sportului" title.

== Legacy ==
"Antrenori, lasati baschetbalistilor libertatea de gandire, nu mai infranati personalitatea jucatorilor vostri cu zeci de zeci de scheme… conducatori ai Federatiei, gasiti solutii pentru a avea cat mai multe echipe de valoare si garantez fara nici o ezitare ca salile vor fi arhipline." (Andrei Folbert, about the future of the Romanian Basketball.)

"Finala cu Dinamo (cel din 1951, din sala Floreasca) a fost un meci de mare ambitie pentru mine. Mi s-a spus si s-a scris ca am jucat exceptional. Nu stiu daca o fi fost chiar asa, dar cert este ca am inscris 25 din cele 38 de puncte ale P.T.T.-ului. A urmat apoi epopea CCA-ului." (Andrei Folbert, about the most important game in the National Championship.)

"Actul de nastere ca sportiv de performanta pentru mine si multi altii. Tin minte ca jucam descult pe fostul teren PTT, din Sos. Stefan cel Mare, cand m-a luat de mana Costi Herold si m-a dus la Telefoane (P.T.T.)...." (Andrei Folbert, about the significance of the Telecom Club.)

"Ne bucuram ca, pentru dumneavoastra, nu suntem doar fosti campioni. E greu sa traiesti in conditiile de astazi, cu o pensie mizera, dar e si mai greu sa fii printre cei dati uitarii. Avem nevoie sa ne revedem din cand in cand, avem nevoie de asemenea momente...." (Andrei Folbert, about being remembered at the Romanian Olympic Committee meeting, April 19, 2003.)

Under the guidance of Stelica Stefan, Andrei Folbert made a basketball movie, as actor and also as director, which was awarded in Spain.

== See also ==
- Basketball at the 1952 Summer Olympics
- Romanian National Basketball Team
