= Horia Demian =

Romanian basketball player

Horia Demian

Horia Demian (9 April 1942 – 8 April 1989) was a Romanian basketball player who played for Universitatea Cluj (Știința Cluj between 1951 and 1965, currently U-BT Cluj-Napoca) from 1960 until 1970. During that period, U Cluj finished second in one season and third in four seasons in the Romanian Basketball Division A.

== Career ==
Born in Cluj, he was selected to play in the Romania national basketball team 165 times and received the award "Maestru al Sportului" from the Romanian Basketball Federation in 1964. He took part in four Eurobasket tournaments, including the Eurobasket 1967 in Finland, where Romania classified fifth, its best classification in history. After ending his career as player, he continued as coach.

Although receiving offers to play elsewhere, including the American professional league, he remained loyal to his team. In 2005, the readers from the newspaper Ziarul Clujeanului voted him the best basketball player from Cluj-Napoca of all times. The readers chose him over the NBA player Gheorghe Mureșan, of whom Horia had been a mentor. The main sports hall in Cluj-Napoca is named after him: Sala Sporturilor "Horia Demian".

== Education ==
Demian obtained a pharmacy degree from the Iuliu Hațieganu University of Medicine and Pharmacy in Cluj-Napoca and a Ph.D. in chemistry.

== Gallery ==
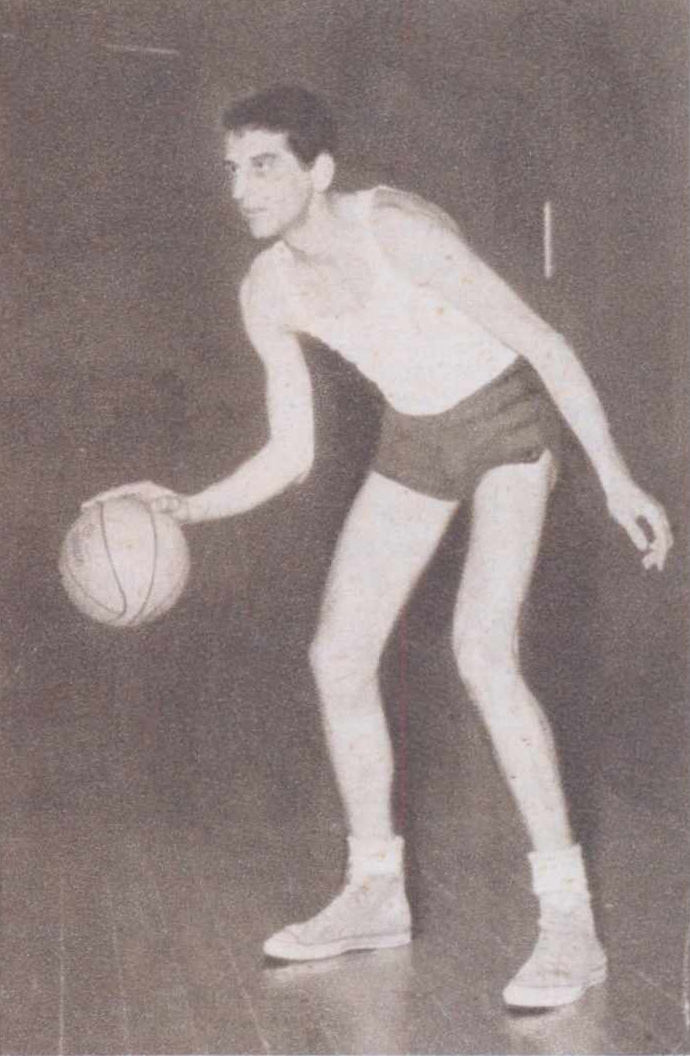
Demian in 1966

Demian memorial plaque, Sala Sporturilor "Horia Demian", Cluj-Napoca

Horia Demian Sports Hall, Cluj-Napoca
