= Cătălin Baciu =

Romanian basketball player

No. 26 – FC Arges
- Position: Center
- League: LN

Personal information
- Born: 26 August 1988 (age 38) Cluj-Napoca, Romania
- Listed height: 7 ft 0 in (2.13 m)

Career information
- NBA draft: 2012: undrafted
- Playing career: 2012–present

Career history
- 2012–2016: U-Mobitelco Cluj-Napoca
- 2016–2018: CSM Steaua Eximbank
- 2018–2019: CSS Bega Timisoara
- 2019–2024: CSM Oradea
- 2024: CSM Constanța
- 2024-present: FC Argeș Pitești

Cătălin Baciu (born 26 August 1988) is a Romanian basketball player for CSM Oradea of the Liga Națională and the Romanian national team.

He participated at the EuroBasket 2017.
