= Nicolescu =

Nicolescu is a Romanian surname. Notable people with the surname include:

- Alexandru Nicolescu, Greek-Catholic bishop
- Basarab Nicolescu, theoretical physicist
- Constantin Nicolescu, general
- Mariana Nicolescu, soprano
- Miron Nicolescu, mathematician
- Gheorghe Constantin Nicolescu, literary historian
- Tatiana Nicolescu, philologist and translator, professor

== See also ==
- Niculescu
