= Josip Bilinovac =

Croatian professional basketball player

No. 11 – Rapid București
- Position: Point guard / shooting guard
- League: Liga Națională

Personal information
- Born: December 30, 1990 (age 35) Mostar, Bosnia and Herzegovina, Yugoslavia
- Listed height: 6 ft 4 in (1.93 m)
- Listed weight: 198 lb (90 kg)

Career information
- NBA draft: 2012: undrafted
- Playing career: 2008–present

Career history
- 2008–2015: Široki
- 2015–2016: Trefl Sopot
- 2016–2017: Jolly JBS
- 2017–2021: Cibona
- 2021: Quimper
- 2021–2022: Široki
- 2022–present: Rapid București

Career highlights
- 4× Bosnian League champion (2009–2012); Croatian League champion (2019); 3× Bosnian Cup winner (2011, 2012, 2014); Stanković Cup winner (2018); Stanković Cup MVP (2018)
Medals
Men's basketball
Representing Croatia
World U-19 Cup
Bronze medal – third place	2009 New Zealand	U-19 Team
European U-18 Championship
Bronze medal – third place	2008 Greece	U-18 Team

Josip Bilinovac (born December 30, 1990) is a Croatian professional basketball player currently playing for Rapid București in the Romanian League.

== Career ==
Bilinovac started his career in HKK Široki in 2008, where he spent eight years.

On August 6, 2015, he signed for Trefl Sopot.

On July 25, 2016, he signed for Jolly JBS.

On July 7, 2017, Bilinovac signed with Cibona. He averaged 5.3 points and 1.8 assists per game in the 2019–20 season. On August 6, he signed a two-year contract with the team.

In February 2021, Bilinovac signed with Quimper playing in the second-tier French LNB Pro B.

In August, 2021, Bilinovac returned to Široki.

In June, 2022, Bilinovac signed for Rapid București of the Romanian League.
