= Bogdan Nicolescu =

Romanian basketball player

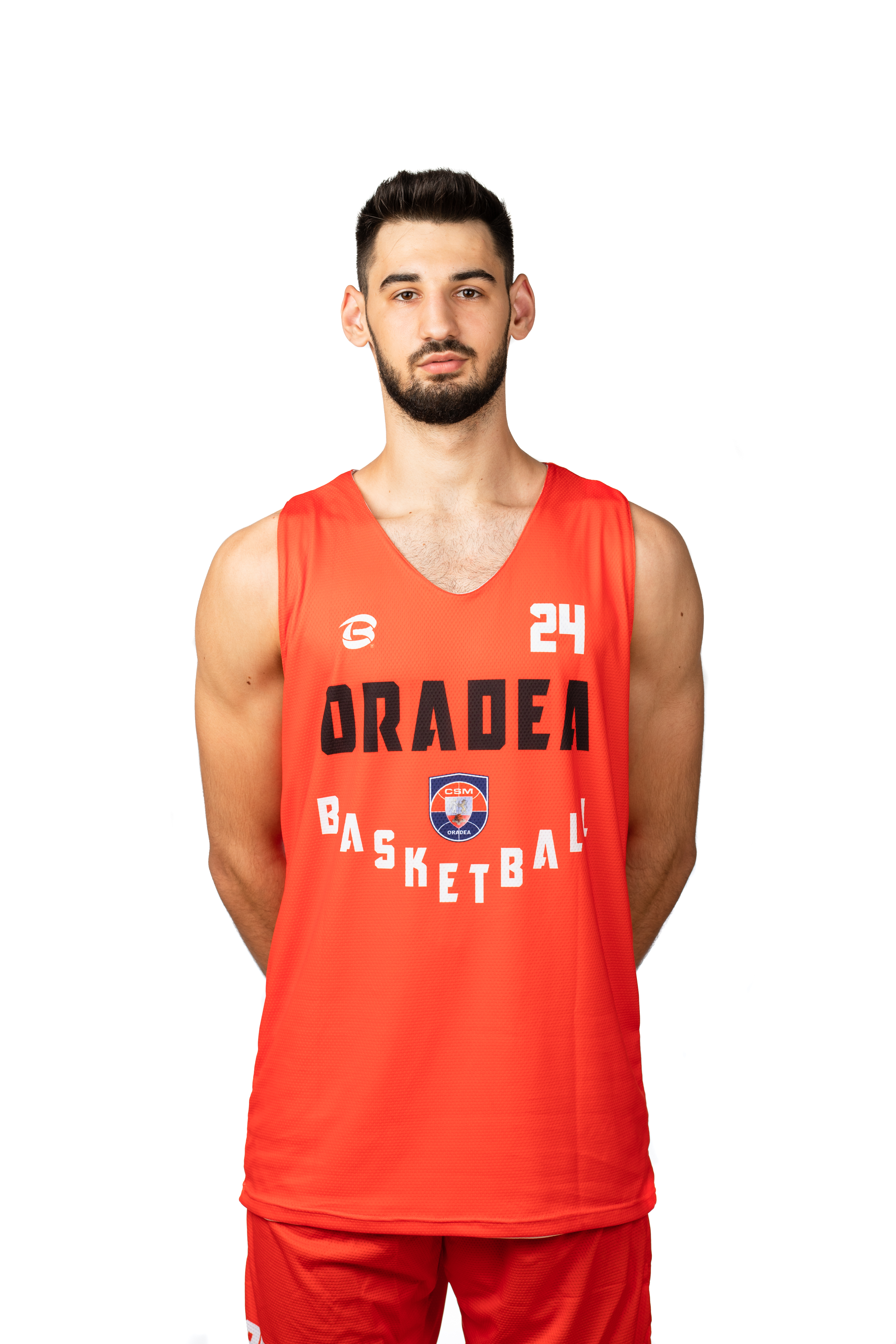

No. 24 – U-BT Cluj-Napoca
- Position: Small forward
- League: LN

Personal information
- Born: 3 January 1997 (age 29) Bucharest, Romania
- Listed height: 1.99 m (6 ft 6 in)
- Listed weight: 89 kg (196 lb)

Career information
- Playing career: 2015–present

Career history
- 2015–2026: CSM Oradea
- 2026–present: U-BT Cluj-Napoca

Career highlights
- 3x Romanian League Champion (2016, 2018 2019); 1x Romanian League Supercup champion (2019); FIBA U20 European Championship 2017 champion

Nicolae-Bogdan "Bobe" Nicolescu (born 3 January 1997) is a Romanian basketball player for U-BT Cluj-Napoca and the captain of the Romanian national team. He participated at the EuroBasket 2017. Bobe is playing in Oradea since 2015 and was part of all of the trophies that team has ever won in Romanian League (2016, 2018, 2019). He was part of two All-Star Games, being voted MVP in both of them.
