= Octavian Calota =

Romanian basketball player

Personal information
- Born: November 22, 1984 (age 41) Mărășești, Romania
- Listed height: 6 ft 2 in (1.88 m)
- Listed weight: 165 lb (75 kg)

Career information
- NBA draft: 2006: undrafted
- Position: Point guard
- Number: 11

Octavian Calota-Popa (born November 22, 1984) is a Romanian basketball player who played for CSM Ploiești of the Romanian Liga Națională and the Romanian national team.

He participated at the EuroBasket 2017.
