= Emanuel Cățe =

Romanian basketball player (born 1997)

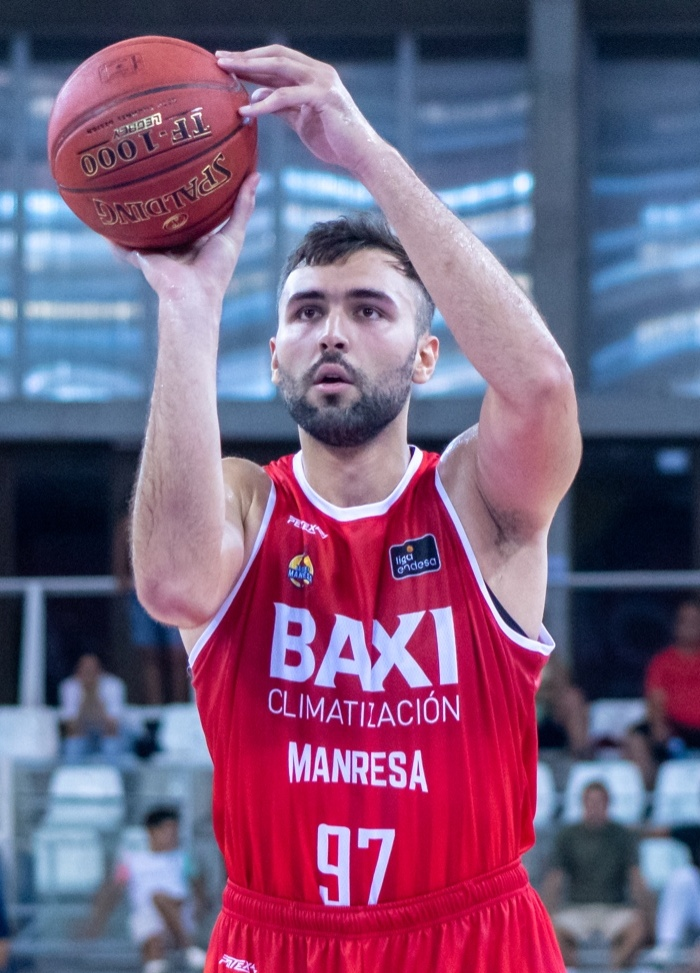
- Cățe with Manresa in 2024

No. 15 – UCAM Murcia
- Position: Center
- League: Liga ACB

Personal information
- Born: 30 July 1997 (age 29) Bucharest, Romania
- Listed height: 2.07 m (6 ft 9 in)

Career history
- 2014–2017: Real Madrid
- 2015–2017: →Sevilla
- 2017–2018: Prat
- 2018–2022: Murcia
- 2022–2024: U-BT Cluj-Napoca
- 2024–2025: Manresa
- 2025–present: Murcia

Career highlights
- All-EuroCup Second Team (2024); Romanian League champion (2023)(2024); Romanian Supercup champion (2022); Romanian Cup winner (2023)(2024)

Emanuel Ion Cățe (born 30 July 1997) is a Romanian basketball player for UCAM Murcia in the Spanish Liga ACB and the Romanian national team.

== Professional career ==
In April 2018, Cățe declared for the 2018 NBA draft. During the 2019–20 season, he averaged 6.6 points and 3.5 rebounds per game. On 13 June 2020 Cățe re-signed with UCAM Murcia.

On July 3, 2022, he signed with U-BT Cluj-Napoca of the Liga Națională. On April 8, 2024, he was named to the All-EuroCup Second Team in which he was rewarded for his season in which he averaged 9 points and 4.4 rebounds pre game.

On July 15, 2024, he signed with Baxi Manresa of the Liga ACB.

On July 9, 2025, he signed with UCAM Murcia CB in the Spanish Liga ACB for a second stint after 3 years.

== National team career ==
Cățe plays for the Romanian national basketball team, which he participated with at the EuroBasket 2017. At age 20, he appeared in five of the six group stage game of Romania, averaging 10.6 minutes and 1.0 point per game.
