= Cornel Călugăreanu =

Romanian basketball player

Corneliu Călugăreanu (30 July 1930 – 2011) was a Romanian basketball player who competed in the 1952 Summer Olympics. He was born in Drăgănești-Vlașca, Teleorman. He was part of the Romanian basketball team that was eliminated in the first round of the 1952 tournament. He played both matches.
