= Ladislau Mokos =

Romanian basketball player

Ladislau Mokos (born 9 October 1931) was a Romanian basketball player, born in Oradea, who competed in the 1952 Summer Olympics. He was part of the Romanian basketball team, which was eliminated in the first round of the 1952 tournament. He played both matches.
