= Cătălin Petrișor =

Romanian basketball player

No. 4 – CSM Focșani
- Position: Point guard
- League: LNB

Personal information
- Born: 9 August 1992 (age 33) Odobești, Romania
- Listed height: 6 ft 2 in (1.88 m)

Career information
- NBA draft: 2009: undrafted

Career history
- 2009–2011: Timișoara
- 2011–2013: Craiova
- 2013–2014: Timișoara
- 2014–2015: Craiova
- 2015: Timișoara
- 2016–2017: Oradea
- 2017–2018: Phoenix Galați
- 2018–present: Focșani

Cătălin Petrișor (born 9 August 1992) is a Romanian basketball player for Focșani of the LNB and the Romanian national team.

He participated at the EuroBasket 2017.
