= Romanian Basketball Federation =

Governing body for basketball in Romania

- Sport: Basketball
- Jurisdiction: Romania
- Abbreviation: FRB
- Founded: 1931; 95 years ago
- Affiliation: FIBA
- Regional affiliation: FIBA Europe
- Headquarters: Bucharest

Official website
- www.frbaschet.ro
- (Romania)

The Romanian Basketball Federation (FRB) (Romanian: Federația Română de Baschet) is the governing body of basketball in Romania. It was founded in 1931, and they became members of FIBA in 1932 as co-founders.

The Romanian Basketball Federation operates the Romanian men's national team and Romanian women's national team. They organize national competitions in Romania, for both the men's and women's senior teams and also the youth national basketball teams.

The top professional league in Romania is Liga Națională.

== Presidents ==
| President | Period |
|---|---|
| Constantin Marinescu | 1931 – 1932 |
| Nicolae Duțescu | 1932 – 1937 |
| Petre Angelescu | 1938 – 1941 |
| Nicolae Duțescu | 1943 – 1944 |
| Constantin Calleya | 1944 – 1945 |
| Petre Georgescu | 1945 – 1946 |
| Dem Danielopol | 1946 – 1955 |
| Eugen Bantea | 1955 – 1958 |
| Leon Teodorescu | 1958 – 1962 |
| Ion Tulpan | 1962 – 1975 |
| Costache Zmeu | 1975 – 1984 |
| Aristeia Hrisca | 1984 – 1989 |
| Dan Cristecu | 1990 – 1992 |
| Dinu Patriciu | 1992 – 1994 |
| Dan Cristecu | 1994 – 1995 |
| Dumitru Ciobotea | 1996 – 2000 |
| Ioan Dobrescu | 2000 – 2005 |
| Carmen Tocală | 2005 – 2013 |
| Horia Păun | 2013 – 2021 |
| Carmen Tocală | 2021 – |

== See also ==
- Romania national basketball team
- Romania national under-19 basketball team
- Romania national under-17 basketball team
- Romania men's national 3x3 team
- Romania women's national basketball team
- Romania women's national under-19 basketball team
- Romania women's national under-17 basketball team
- Romania women's national 3x3 team
