= Adrian Petroșanu =

Romanian basketball player

Adrian Petroșanu (born 8 September 1924) was a Romanian basketball player who competed in the 1952 Summer Olympics. He was part of the Romanian basketball team, which was eliminated in the first round of the 1952 tournament. He played both matches.
