= CSA Steaua București (basketball) =

Professional basketball club in Bucharest, Romania

Steaua București
- Nickname: Militarii (The Army Men); Roș-Albaștrii (The Red and Blues)
- Leagues: Liga Națională
- Founded: 1952; 74 years ago
- History: List: CSA Steaua București (1952–1996) Steaua-Erbașu București (1996–1998) CSA Steaua București (1998–2009) Steaua Turabo București (2009–2012) CSA Steaua București (2012–2013) Steaua CSM EximBank (2013–2018) Steaua București (2018-present)
- Arena: Mihai Viteazu; Polyvalent Hall
- Capacity: 2,000; 5,300
- Location: Bucharest, Romania
- President: Virgil Stănescu
- Team manager: Adrian Voinescu
- Head coach: Andrei Mandache
- Championships: 21 Romanian Leagues
Home	Away

Steaua București (Basketball) is the basketball section of CSA Steaua București sport club, based in Bucharest, Romania. The club competes in Liga Națională, the top tier of Romanian basketball.

Being part of one of Romania's biggest sports clubs, famous especially for its football team, Steaua's basketball club enjoyed plenty of success over the years, but also disappointments. Many of the last few years have been spent in the second division, including the previous season. In 2008, BC Steaua merged with BC Targoviste, thus changing its name again, this time to BC Steaua Turabo București, and taking over Târgoviște's place in the Liga Națională. In 2013, the team merged with CSM Bucharest and became Steaua CSM.

== History ==
Following the Romanian Revolution, Baschet Club Steaua București became the first privately owned basketball club in Romania. The club declared bankruptcy a few years later, while CSA Steaua continued its basketball activity only at youth level under the name Clubul Sportiv Școlar Steaua București.

In 2008, Steaua merged with BC Târgoviște and returned to the first division under the name BC Steaua București. Under head coach Mladen Jojic, the club focused on competing in Divizia B with a young squad composed primarily of Romanian players, with an average age of 21.

The team eventually returned to the top tier of Romanian basketball. In 2011, Steaua reached the Romanian Cup final, marking the club's first appearance in a major final in several years.

In 2013, the club merged with CSM Bucharest and adopted the name CSM Steaua Bucharest.

During the 2015–16 season, the newly formed team made its European debut in the Eurocup.

== Fans ==
Steaua Bucharest's basketball games often struggle to attract a large audience, partly due to the club's greater historical and cultural association with its football team, which has a more passionate following. While basketball enjoys popularity in Romania, it competes with other sports and entertainment options for spectators' attention. Despite the lower turnout, the occasional presence of the ultras from Peluza Sud brings an electric atmosphere to the games.

== Achievements ==
- Romanian Championship
  - Winners: (21): 1956, 1958, 1959, 1960, 1961, 1962, 1963, 1964, 1966, 1967, 1978, 1980, 1981, 1982, 1984, 1985, 1986, 1987, 1989, 1990, 1991
- Euroleague
  - Third place (1): 1961

== Season by season ==
Season	Tier	League	Pos.	Romanian Cup	European competitions		
2009–10	1	Liga Națională	7th				
2010–11	1	Liga Națională	4th	Runner-up	2 Eurocup	RS	3–3
2011–12	Did not play						
2012–13	2	Liga I	1st				
2013–14	1	Liga Națională	9th				
2014–15	1	Liga Națională	4th				
2015–16	1	Liga Națională	3rd				
2016–17	1	Liga Națională	2nd	Semifinalist	2 FIBA Europe Cup	RS	1–5
2017–18	1	Liga Națională	2nd	Semifinalist	2 FIBA Europe Cup	QR2	0–2
2018–19	1	Liga Națională			2 FIBA Europe Cup	RS	1–5

== Current roster ==
Note: Flags indicate national team eligibility at FIBA-sanctioned events. Players may hold other non-FIBA nationalities not displayed.

Steaua București roster
Players
Coaches

Pos.	No.	Nat.	Name	Ht.	Age
F/C	1	(Romania)	Sparlac, Vladimir Ioan	2.02 m (6 ft 8 in)	20 – 17 November 2005
F/C	2	(United States)	Farr, James	2.08 m (6 ft 10 in)	33 – 2 November 1992
SG	3	(United States)	Jackson, K. J.	1.88 m (6 ft 2 in)	28 – 27 March 1998
G	4	(Romania)	Harangus, Alexandru	1.90 m (6 ft 3 in)	25 – 4 March 2001
PG	7	(Romania)	Mandisodza, Robin	1.80 m (5 ft 11 in)	22 – 26 July 2003
G/F	9	(Romania)	Stan, Albert-Mark	1.92 m (6 ft 4 in)	21 – 1 June 2004
C	14	(Nigeria)	Olisemeka, Peter	2.07 m (6 ft 9 in)	34 – 9 December 1991
F	17	(Romania)	Girbea, Tudor	1.97 m (6 ft 6 in)	27 – 16 October 1998
PG	23	(Croatia)	Vragović, Karlo	1.92 m (6 ft 4 in)	37 – 13 May 1989
PF	30	(Serbia)	Cvetinović, Nikola	2.03 m (6 ft 8 in)	37 – 19 December 1988
F	44	(Serbia)	Djuric, Zarko	1.98 m (6 ft 6 in)	36 – 28 August 1989
SF	51	(Croatia)	Konjević, Davor	1.98 m (6 ft 6 in)	35 – 18 December 1990

Head coach

- (Romania) Andrei Mandache

Assistant coach(es)

- (Romania) Zoltan Safar
- (Romania) Valentin Boian
- (Romania) Cătălin Burlacu

Legend

- (C) Team captain
- Injured

- Roster
Updated: 2 March 2022

== Notable players ==
- Ronnie Harrell (born 1996)
- (Finland) Gerald Lee

== Head coaches ==
- (Romania) Constantin Herold (1954–1968)
- (Romania) Vasile Popescu (1968–1975)
- (Romania) Mihai Nedef (1975–1982)
- (Romania) Mircea Câmpeanu (1982–1989)
- (Romania) Nicolae Pirsu (1989–1994)
- (Romania) Dumitru Lecca (1994–1999)
- (Romania) Costel Cernat (1999–2004)
- (Romania) Radu Costea (2004–2008)
- (Bosnia and Herzegovina) Mladen Jojić (2008–2015)
- (Romania) Radu Costea (2015–2016)
- (Lithuania) Marius Runkauskas (2016–2018)
- (Finland) Jukka Toijala (2016–2019)
- (Serbia) Saša Ocokoljić (2019–2021)
- (Romania) Eugen Ilie (2021–?)
- (Romania) Ciprian Enache (2023-2024)
- (Portugal) Pedro Monteiro (2024-2025)
- (Romania) Andrei Mandache (2025-present)

== Arenas ==
Steaua București plays its home national domestic league games at the 2,000-seat Sala Mihai Viteazul. They play their home European league games at the 5,300 seat Sala Polivalentă.
