= Radu Paliciuc =

Romanian basketball player (born 1988)

No. 8 – CSU Sibiu
- Position: Small forward
- League: LN

Personal information
- Born: 13 September 1988 (age 38) Brașov, Romania
- Listed height: 6 ft 7 in (2.01 m)
- Listed weight: 211 lb (96 kg)

Career information
- NBA draft: 2010: undrafted

Radu Paliciuc (born 13 September 1988) is a Romanian basketball player for CSU Sibiu and the Romanian national team.

He participated at the EuroBasket 2017.
