= Rareș Mandache =

Romanian basketball player

Personal information
- Born: 2 October 1987 (age 39) Arad, Romania
- Listed height: 6 ft 3 in (1.91 m)

Career information
- NBA draft: 2009: undrafted
- Playing career: 2008–2025
- Position: Point guard / shooting guard
- Coaching career: 2025–present

Career history

Playing
- 2005–2007: CSM Oradea
- 2007–2008: Winchendon Massachusetts
- 2008–2009: CSU Brașov
- 2009–2010: Otopeni
- 2010–2011: Steaua București
- 2011–2012: Keravnos
- 2012–2014: Gaz Metan Mediaș
- 2014–2015: U-BT Cluj-Napoca
- 2015–2018: CSM Oradea
- 2018–2021: Steaua București
- 2021-2024: Dinamo București
- 2024–2025: Steaua București

Coaching
- 2025–: Steaua București

Career highlights
- 2x Romanian League champion (2016, 2017); EuroBasket steals leader (2017)

Rareș Andrei Mandache (born 2 October 1987) is a Romanian professional basketball coach and former player, who currently is the head coach for Steaua București of the Liga Națională.

== International career ==
He represented Romania's national basketball team at the 2015 Eurobasket qualification. Mandache was also part of the roster of Romania at EuroBasket 2017.
