= Penait Călcâi =

Romanian sports shooter

Panait Călcâi
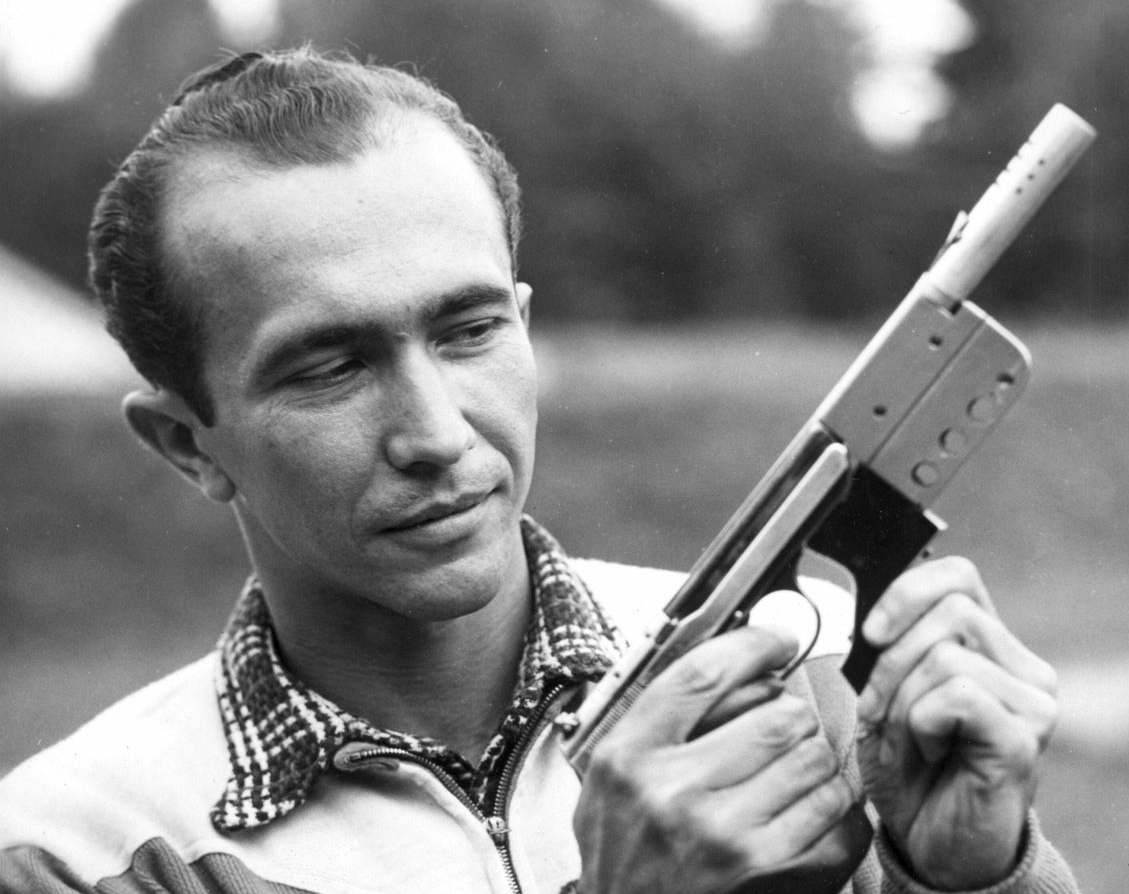
- 1952

Personal information
- Nationality: Romanian
- Born: 8 July 1924 Focșani, Romania
- Died: 4 April 1976 (aged 51) Centerville, Ohio, U.S.

Sport
- Sport: Sports shooting

Panait Călcâi (8 July 1924 – 4 April 1976) was a Romanian sports shooter, educated electric engineer, and longtime curler. He competed in the 25 m pistol event at the 1952 Summer Olympics. He also tried out for the Olympic curling team in 1956 but was unsuccessful. After moving to the West after the games, he was allowed to settle in West-Germany. Călcâi died in Centerville, Ohio on 4 April 1976, at the age of 51. Near the end of his life, he was known to make and recite poems to anyone who shot or curled competitively. Panait was the second eldest of three brothers and one sister.
