= Grigore Costescu =

Romanian basketball player

Grigore Costescu (April 11, 1934 – May 2008) was a Romanian basketball player who competed in the 1952 Summer Olympics. He was born in Bucharest. He was part of the Romanian basketball team, which was eliminated in the first round of the 1952 tournament. He played in a match against Italy, which Romania lost 53–39.
