= Emanoil Răducanu =

Romanian basketball player

Emanoil Răducanu (October 7, 1929 in Bucharest – 1991) was a Romanian basketball player who competed in the 1952 Summer Olympics.

He was part of the Romanian basketball team, which was eliminated in the first round of the 1952 tournament. He played both matches.
