= Cezar Niculescu =

Romanian basketball player (1927–1981)

Cezar Niculescu (27 July 1927 – July 1981) was a Romanian basketball player who competed in the 1952 Summer Olympics. He was part of the Romanian basketball team, which was eliminated in the first round of the 1952 tournament. He played both matches. Niculescu died in July 1981.
