= CS Rapid București (men's basketball) =

Rapid București
- Leagues: Liga Națională
- Founded: 1934; 91 years ago
- History: CFR București (1934–1937); Rapid București (1937–1945); CFR București (1945–1950); Locomotiva PTT (1950–1958); Rapid București (1958–present)
- Arena: Sala Rapid
- Capacity: 1,500
- Location: Bucharest, Romania
- Team colors: White, Burgundy
- President: Valy Caciuriac
- Head coach: Tudor Costescu
- Championships: 1 Romanian Leagues
- Website: clubulrapid.ro
Home	Away

Clubul Sportiv Rapid București, commonly known as CS Rapid București, Rapid București, or simply Rapid, is a Romanian basketball club based in Bucharest, which currently participates in the Liga Națională, the top-tier league in Romania. The team represents the basketball men's section of CS Rapid București, a multi-sports club. Rapid won a national title in 1951 and finished three times third, in 1961, 1964 and 1983, but in the last years played mostly in the second-tier Liga I. However, in 2018 the league was merged with the Liga Națională, which meant that Rapid got promoted back to the top flight.

== Honours ==
- Liga Națională

Champions (1): 1951

== Current roster ==
Note: Flags indicate national team eligibility at FIBA-sanctioned events. Players may hold other non-FIBA nationalities not displayed.

CS Rapid București roster
Players
Coaches

Pos.	No.	Nat.	Name	Ht.	Age
PG	0	(United States)	Gilbert, Alterique	1.83 m (6 ft 0 in)	27 – 6 October 1997
C	1	(Israel)	Altit, Ben	2.08 m (6 ft 10 in)	32 – 4 April 1993
SF	2	(Romania)	Dorneanu, Matei	1.96 m (6 ft 5 in)	22 – 28 March 2003
PG	3	(Romania)	Șomăcescu, Tudor	1.85 m (6 ft 1 in)	20 – 15 June 2005
G/F	4	(Cambodia)	Pridgett, Sayeed	1.96 m (6 ft 5 in)	27 – 22 May 1998
SG	5	(Romania)	Badiu, Marcu	1.85 m (6 ft 1 in)	24 – 24 November 2000
SG	11	(Croatia)	Bilinovac, Josip	1.91 m (6 ft 3 in)	34 – 30 December 1990
PF	14	(Lithuania)	Petrilevičius, Paulius	2.00 m (6 ft 7 in)	34 – 23 March 1991
C	15	(Romania)	Sandu, Bogdan	2.00 m (6 ft 7 in)	38 – 15 June 1987
SF	21	(Romania)	Andrei, Mihnea	1.99 m (6 ft 6 in)	27 – 21 September 1997
PG	24	(Romania)	Oprea, David	1.89 m (6 ft 2 in)	22 – 4 July 2003
PF/C	32	(United States)	Fitzpatrick, Toarlyn	2.06 m (6 ft 9 in)	35 – 4 September 1989
SF	35	(Romania)	Girbea, Tudor	1.97 m (6 ft 6 in)	26 – 16 October 1998

Head coach

- (Romania) Costescu, Tudor

Assistant coach(es)

- (Romania) Bulancea, Marius

Legend

- (C) Team captain
- Injured

- Roster
Updated: September 28, 2023

=== Depth chart ===
Pos.	Starting 5	Bench 1	Bench 2
C	Ben Altit	Toarlyn Fitzpatrick	Bogdan Sandu
PF	Paulius Petrilevičius	Matei Dorneanu
SF	Tudor Girbea	David Oprea	Mihnea Andrei
SG	Josip Bilinovac	Tudor Șomăcescu	Marcu Badiu
PG	Sayeed Pridgett	Alterique Gilbert

== Notable players ==
- Ben Altit
- Tyler Stone
