= Mihai Nedef =

Romanian basketball player

Mihai Nadef
Personal information
- Nationality: Romanian
- Born: 8 December 1931 Bucharest, Kingdom of Romania
- Died: June 10, 2017 Romania

Sport
- Sport: Basketball

Mihai Nedef (November 8, 1931 – 10 June 2017) was a Romanian basketball player who competed in the 1952 Summer Olympics. He was born in Bucharest. He was part of the Romanian basketball team, which was eliminated in the first round of the 1952 tournament. He played both matches. He died on 10 June 2017.
