= Liviu Naghy =

Romanian basketball player

Personal information
- Born: 20 November 1929
- Died: 1989 (aged 59–60)

Liviu Naghy (November 20, 1929 in Oradea – 1989) was a Romanian basketball player who competed in the 1952 Summer Olympics.

He was part of the Romanian basketball team, which was eliminated in the first round of the 1952 tournament. He played both matches.
