= 2026–27 U-BT Cluj-Napoca season =

U-BT Cluj-Napoca
2026–27 season
- President: (Romania) Marius Bojiță
- Head coach: (Romania) Mihai Silvășan
- ABA League: Schedule
- Liga Națională: Schedule
- EuroCup: Schedule
- Romanian Cup: Schedule
Home	Away
- All statistics correct as of 1 November 2026.

In the 2026–27 season, U-BT Cluj-Napoca competes in the Romanian Liga Națională, Romanian Cup, ABA League and EuroCup.

== Players ==
=== Current roster ===
Note: Flags indicate national team eligibility at FIBA-sanctioned events. Players may hold other non-FIBA nationalities not displayed.

U-BT Cluj-Napoca roster
Players
Coaches

Pos.	No.	Nat.	Name	Ht.	Wt.	Age
PG	0	(United States)	Livingston II, Otis	1.80 m (5 ft 11 in)	80 kg (176 lb)	30 – 12 October 1996
CG	1	(United States)	Smart, Javonte	1.93 m (6 ft 4 in)	93 kg (205 lb)	27 – 3 June 1999
PG	2	(Romania)	Bernat, Thomas	1.91 m (6 ft 3 in)	80 kg (176 lb)	16 – 5 December 2009
PF	3	(Serbia)	Beslać, Dušan (injured)	2.06 m (6 ft 9 in)	103 kg (227 lb)	28 – 6 October 1998
PG	5	(United States)	Walker, Leland	1.85 m (6 ft 1 in)	84 kg (185 lb)	23 – 12 April 2003
PG	7	(Romania)	Cepoi, Andrei	1.86 m (6 ft 1 in)	75 kg (165 lb)	18 – 9 October 2008
PF	8	(United States)	McCreary, Jalyn	2.01 m (6 ft 7 in)	102 kg (225 lb)	26 – 19 September 2000
SF	11	(Romania)	Câmpean, Alexandru	1.92 m (6 ft 4 in)	86 kg (190 lb)	17 – 8 May 2009
F/C	13	(United States)	Bishop, Christian	2.01 m (6 ft 7 in)	100 kg (220 lb)	27 – 13 June 1999
G/F	20	(United States)	Bess, Javon	1.98 m (6 ft 6 in)	100 kg (220 lb)	30 – 1 April 1996
G/F	21	(United States)	Hill, Malcolm	1.98 m (6 ft 6 in)	100 kg (220 lb)	31 – 26 October 1995
C	22	(Serbia)	Plavšić, Uroš	2.16 m (7 ft 1 in)	120 kg (265 lb)	27 – 22 December 1998
SF	24	(Romania)	Nicolescu, Bogdan	1.99 m (6 ft 6 in)	89 kg (196 lb)	29 – 3 January 1997
C	32	(Romania)	Tancău, Tudor	2.06 m (6 ft 9 in)	97 kg (214 lb)	17 – 2 January 2009
SG	35	(United States) (Romania)	Richard, Patrick (C)	1.96 m (6 ft 5 in)	93 kg (205 lb)	36 – 25 January 1990
CG	77	(Estonia)	Kullamäe, Kristian	1.94 m (6 ft 4 in)	85 kg (187 lb)	27 – 25 May 1999
PG	88	(Romania)	Illeș, Luca	1.95 m (6 ft 5 in)	90 kg (198 lb)	19 – 8 January 2007

Head coach

- (Romania) Mihai Silvășan

Assistant coach(es)

- (United States) Isaac Jenkins
- (Serbia) Mihajlo Markovic
- (Romania) Mihai Popa

General manager

- (Serbia) (Romania) Branko Ćuić

Team manager

- (Romania) Răzvan Cenean

Legend

- (C) Team captain
- (IN) Inactive
- Injured

- Roster
- Transactions
Updated: November 10, 2026

=== Depth chart ===
Pos.	Starting 5	Bench 1	Bench 2	Bench 3	Inactive
C	Uroš Plavšić	Christian Bishop	Tudor Tancău
PF	Jalyn McCreary	Bogdan Nicolescu			Dušan Beslać (injured)
SF	Malcolm Hill	Javon Bess		Alexandru Câmpean
SG	Javonte Smart	Kristian Kullamäe	Patrick Richard	Andrei Cepoi
PG	Otis Livingston II	Leland Walker	Luca Illeș	Thomas Bernat

=== Roster changes ===
==== In ====
No.	Pos.	Nat.	Name	Moving from		Type	Date	Source
24	SF	(Romania)	Bogdan Nicolescu	CSM Oradea	(Romania)	Free transfer	13 June 2026	
0	PG	(United States)	Otis Livingston	Bàsquet Girona	(Spain)	Free transfer	14 June 2026	
8	PF	(United States)	Jalyn McCreary	Široki	(Bosnia and Herzegovina)	Free transfer	14 June 2026	
3	PF	(Serbia)	Dušan Beslać	Avtodor	(Russia)	Free transfer	15 June 2026	
21	G/F	(United States)	Malcolm Hill	Delaware Blue Coats	(United States)	Free transfer	22 June 2026	
20	G/F	(United States)	Javon Bess	Igokea	(Bosnia and Herzegovina)	Free transfer	2 July 2026	
22	C	(Serbia)	Uroš Plavšić	Crvena zvezda	(Serbia)	Free transfer	11 July 2026	
77	G	(Estonia)	Kristian Kullamäe	Lietkabelis	(Lithuania)	Free transfer	27 July 2026	
13	F/C	(United States)	Christian Bishop	Pinar Karşıyaka	(Turkey)	Free transfer	29 July 2026	
11	SF	(Romania)	Alexandru Câmpean	Youth system	(Romania)	Senior contact	12 August 2026	
2	PG	(Romania)	Thomas Bernat	Youth system	(Romania)	Senior contact	13 August 2026	
41	PG	(Romania)	Luca Illeș	Partizan Belgrade	(Serbia)	Loan	16 August 2026	
1	CG	(United States)	Javonte Smart	Osceola Magic	(United States)	Free transfer	19 August 2026	
5	PG	(United States)	Leland Walker	PAOK Thessaloniki	(Greece)	Loan	28 October 2026	

==== Out ====
No.	Pos.	Nat.	Name	Moving to		Type	Date	Source
22	G	(United States)	Trey Woodbury	JL Bourg	(France)	End of contract	7 June 2026	
1	G	(Panama)	Iverson Molinar	Budućnost	(Montenegro)	End of contract	19 June 2026	
4	F/C	(United States)	Nighael Ceaser	Niners Chemnitz	(Germany)	End of contract	23 June 2026	
44	SF	(Sweden)	Jeffery Taylor	Norrköping Dolphins	(Sweden)	End of contract	24 June 2026	
0	G/F	(Cuba)	Karel Guzmán	Hapoel HaEmek	(Israel)	End of contract	22 July 2026	
10	C	(Serbia)	Dušan Miletić	Hapoel Jerusalem	(Israel)	End of contract	4 August 2026	
11	PG	(United States) (Romania)	Daron Russell	Anadolu Efes	(Turkey)	End of contract	6 August 2026	
8	C	(Israel) (Romania)	Ben Altit	Free agent		End of contract	6 August 2026	
6	PG	(Romania)	Darius Miron	The McCallie High school	(United States)	End of contract	6 August 2026	
55	G/F	(Australia)	Mitch Creek	Free agent		End of contract	7 August 2026	

== Pre-season and friendlies ==
=== Matches ===
Win Loss Canceled

29 August 2026	CS Vâlcea 1924 (Romania)	82–89	(Romania) U-BT Cluj-Napoca	Râmnicu Vâlcea
13:00	Scoring by quarter: 21-22, 18-23, 24-28, 19-16
YouTube		Boxscore	Pts: Livingston 26; Rebs: Plavšić 10; Asts: Smart 6 PIR: Livingston 25	Arena: Traian

30 August 2026	CS Vâlcea 1924 (Romania)	96–93	(Romania) U-BT Cluj-Napoca	Râmnicu Vâlcea
13:00	Scoring by quarter: 22-20, 22-30, 26-27, 26-16
YouTube		Boxscore	Pts: Smart 24; Rebs: Livingston, Bishop 7 Asts: Smart, Livingston 6	Arena: Traian

9 September 2026	Tofaş Bursa (Turkey)	93–94	(Romania) U-BT Cluj-Napoca	Antalya
14:45	Scoring by quarter: 27-26, 24-25, 21-21, 21-22
YouTube	Pts: Jones 20	Boxscore	Pts: Smart 23; Rebs: Hill, Omić 7 Asts: Smart, Bess 5	Arena: Gloria Sports Arena

12 September 2026	U-BT Cluj-Napoca (Romania)	76–85	(Turkey) Bahçeşehir Koleji	Antalya
17:00	Scoring by quarter: 14-20, 15-23, 25-21, 22-21
YouTube	Pts: Kullamäe 18; Rebs: Hill, Bishop 7 Asts: Smart 7	Boxscore	Pts: Reed 14; Rebs: Reed 5 Asts: Flynn 4	Arena: Gloria Sports Arena

13 September 2026	Anadolu Efes (Turkey)	87–69	(Romania) U-BT Cluj-Napoca	Antalya
16:00	Scoring by quarter: 12-13, 18-21, 32-20, 25-15
YouTube	Pts: James, Loyd 13; Rebs: Jones 8 Asts: Yılmaz 5	Boxscore	Pts: Kullamäe 20; Rebs: Hill 7 Asts: Kullamäe 5	Arena: Gloria Sports Arena

18 September 2026	AEK Athens (Greece)	Cancelled	(Romania) U-BT Cluj-Napoca	Athens

19 September 2026	Peristeri Betsson (Greece)	85–89	(Romania) U-BT Cluj-Napoca	Athens
17:00	Scoring by quarter: 26-23, 21-24, 20-25, 18-17
	Pts: Anderson 19; Rebs: Nichols, Payne 5 Asts: Nichols 4	Boxscore	Pts: Smart 23; Rebs: Bishop 9 Asts: Hill 4	Arena: Peristeri Arena

== ABA League ==
=== Regular season ===
==== Group B ====
Pos	Team	Pld	W	L	PF	PA	PD	Pts	Qualification or relegation
2	(United Arab Emirates Basketball Association) Dubai Basketball	4	4	0	378	328	+50	8	Advance to Top 8
3	(Croatian Basketball Federation) Zadar	4	2	2	319	301	+18	6	Advance to Top 8
4	(Romanian Basketball Federation) U-BT Cluj-Napoca	4	2	2	355	343	+12	6	Advance to Top 8
5	(Basketball Federation of Bosnia and Herzegovina) Bosna BH Telecom	4	2	2	362	352	+10	6	Advance to Playout
6	(Basketball Federation of Serbia) Spartak Office Shoes	4	2	2	330	328	+2	6	Advance to Playout

Updated to match(es) played on 25 October. Source: ABA League

==== Matches ====
27 September 2026 1	Mega Superbet (Serbia)	Postponed	(Romania) U-BT Cluj-Napoca	Belgrade
Arena Sport		Report		Arena: Ranko Žeravica Hall

3 October 2026 2	BC Vienna (Austria)	84–95	(Romania) U-BT Cluj-Napoca	Vienna
17:00 (UTC+2)	Scoring by quarter: 19-25, 22-20, 15-21, 28-29
Prima Sport, Arena Sport	Pts: Langović 23; Rebs: Muila 8 Asts: Njie 8 PIR: Langović 23	Report	Pts: Smart 17; Rebs: Smart 7 Asts: Smart 8 PIR: Smart 27	Arena: Hallmann Dome; Attendance: 1,000; Referees: Tadej Venta, Sylwia Aleksandra Zbikowska, Mario Madjoski

10 October 2026 3	U-BT Cluj-Napoca (Romania)	85–92	(United Arab Emirates) Dubai Basketball	Cluj-Napoca
13:00 (UTC+3)	Scoring by quarter: 19-21, 26-15, 14-32, 26-24
Prima Sport, Arena Sport	Pts: Kullamäe 19; Rebs: Plavšić 10; Asts: Smart 6 PIR: Plavšić 19	Report	Pts: Wright 14; Rebs: Petrušev 6 Asts: Bacon 5 PIR: Petrušev 19	Arena: BTarena; Attendance: 6,228; Referees: Milosav Kaludjerovic, Vladimír Karnay, Alex Šešević

18 October 2026 4	Spartak Subotica (Serbia)	89–75	(Romania) U-BT Cluj-Napoca	Subotica
19:30 (UTC+2)	Scoring by quarter: 27-17, 24-17, 16-20, 22-21
Prima Sport, Arena Sport	Pts: Ilić 23; Rebs: Ilić 9 Asts: Cerovina 6 PIR: Ilić 35	Report	Pts: McCreary 19; Rebs: Plavšić 12; Asts: Smart 7 PIR: Plavšić 18	Arena: Dudova Šuma Sports Hall; Attendance: 1,280; Referees: Haris Bijedić, Lazar Knežević, Jovan Vujović

23 October 2026 5	U-BT Cluj-Napoca (Romania)	100–78	(Montenegro) SC Derby	Cluj-Napoca
18:00 (UTC+3)	Scoring by quarter: 24-16, 29-30, 27-15, 20-17
Prima Sport, Arena Sport	Pts: Livingston, Bishop 16; Rebs: McCreary, Plavšić 6 Asts: Kullamäe 5 PIR: Bishop 22	Report	Pts: Uskoković 19; Rebs: Wesson 6 Asts: Pavićević 3 PIR: Uskoković 14	Arena: Horia Demian Sports Hall; Attendance: 2,417; Referees: Robert Mordal, Hakan Senkesen, Sylwia Aleksandra Zbikowska

2 November 2026 6	Partizan (Serbia)	97–77	(Romania) U-BT Cluj-Napoca	Belgrade
13:00 (UTC+1)	Scoring by quarter: 34-18, 23-31, 19-17, 21-11
Prima Sport, Arena Sport	Pts: Jones 16; Rebs: Stevens 6 Asts: Vildoza 7 PIR: Jones, Hayes 19	Report	Pts: Smart 15; Rebs: McCreary, Plavšić 6 Asts: Livingston 7 PIR: Plavšić 19	Arena: Ranko Žeravica Sports Hall; Attendance: 1,017; Referees: Shaker Nasrollah, Hakan Senkesen, Stefan Vukovic

8 November 2026 7	U-BT Cluj-Napoca (Romania)	91–93	(Bosnia and Herzegovina) Bosna BH Telecom	Cluj-Napoca
12:00 (UTC+2)	Scoring by quarter: 23-25, 29-17, 21-23, 18-28
Prima Sport, Arena Sport	Pts: Livingston, Plavšić 15; Rebs: Plavšić 14; Asts: Livingston 7 PIR: Plavšić 27	Report	Pts: Perry 19; Rebs: Perry, Browne 7 Asts: Atić 6 PIR: Browne 26	Arena: BTarena; Attendance: 2,791; Referees: Robert Mordal, Vojkan Živković, Carlos Javier Dueñas Urrego

14 November 2026 8	U-BT Cluj-Napoca (Romania)	77–71	(Slovenia) Perspektiva Ilirija	Cluj-Napoca
13:00 (UTC+2)	Scoring by quarter: 16-13, 23-15, 14-21, 24-21
Prima Sport, Arena Sport	Pts: McCreary 14; Rebs: Plavšić 10; Asts: Walker 5 PIR: McCreary, Plavšić 17	Report	Pts: Todorović 14; Rebs: Shelton 8 Asts: Shelton 6 PIR: Todorović 17	Arena: BTarena; Attendance: 2,803; Referees: Nikola Domazet, Sylwia Aleksandra Zbikowska, Mohammed Alkurdi

22 November 2026 9	U-BT Cluj-Napoca (Romania)	vs.	(Croatia) Zadar	Cluj-Napoca
Arena Sport		Report		Arena: BTarena

6 December 2026 10	Bosna BH Telecom (Bosnia and Herzegovina)	vs.	(Romania) U-BT Cluj-Napoca	Sarajevo
Arena Sport		Report		Arena: Zetra Olympic Hall

20 December 2026 12	Zadar (Croatia)	vs.	(Romania) U-BT Cluj-Napoca	Zadar
Arena Sport		Report		Arena: Krešimir Ćosić Hall

26 December 2026 13	U-BT Cluj-Napoca (Romania)	vs.	(Serbia) Partizan	Cluj-Napoca
Arena Sport		Report		Arena: BTarena

4 January 2027 14	Dubai Basketball (United Arab Emirates)	vs.	(Romania) U-BT Cluj-Napoca	Dubai
Arena Sport		Report		Arena: Coca-Cola Arena

10 January 2027 15	U-BT Cluj-Napoca (Romania)	vs.	(Serbia) Spartak Subotica	Cluj-Napoca
Arena Sport		Report		Arena: BTarena

16 January 2027 16	U-BT Cluj-Napoca (Romania)	vs.	(Serbia) Mega Superbet	Cluj-Napoca
Arena Sport		Report		Arena: BTarena

21 January 2027 11	SC Derby (Montenegro)	vs.	(Romania) U-BT Cluj-Napoca	Podgorica
Arena Sport		Report		Arena: Morača Sports Center

24 January 2027 17	U-BT Cluj-Napoca (Romania)	vs.	(Austria) BC Vienna	Cluj-Napoca
Arena Sport		Report		Arena: BTarena

28 January 2027 18	Perspektiva Ilirija (Slovenia)	vs.	(Romania) U-BT Cluj-Napoca	Ljubljana
Arena Sport		Report		Arena: Tivoli Hall

== EuroCup ==
=== Regular season ===
==== Group B ====
Pos	Team	Pld	W	L	PF	PA	PD	Qualification
4	(Italian Basketball Federation) Umana Reyer Venezia	7	3	4	604	564	+40	Advance to eighthfinals
5	(Turkish Basketball Federation) Türk Telekom	7	3	4	564	566	−2	
6	(Lithuanian Basketball Federation) Šiauliai	7	3	4	560	605	−45	
7	(German Basketball Federation) Skyliners Frankfurt	7	3	4	606	663	−57	
8	(Romanian Basketball Federation) U-BT Cluj-Napoca	7	2	5	570	660	−90	

Updated to match(es) played on 12 November 2026. Source: EuroCup
Rules for classification: All points scored in extra period(s) will not be counted in the standings, nor for any tie-break situation.

==== Matches ====
30 September 2026 1	Maxima Roma (Italy)	89–55	(Romania) U-BT Cluj-Napoca	Rome
21:00 (UTC+2)	Scoring by quarter: 34-18, 21-12, 27-10, 7-15
Prima Sport, EuroLeague TV	Pts: Ryan 16; Rebs: Wheatle 8 Asts: Holiday 7 PIR: Ryan, Lemar 18	Report	Pts: Smart, Kullamäe 12; Rebs: Beslać 7 Asts: Smart 4 PIR: Smart 21	Arena: PalaEur; Attendance: 1,208; Referees: Marcin Kowalski, Huseyin Celik, Karol Kowalski

7 October 2026 2	U-BT Cluj-Napoca (Romania)	98–92	(Italy) Reyer Venezia	Cluj-Napoca
19:00 (UTC+3)	Scoring by quarter: 21-27, 19-23, 29-19, 29-23
Prima Sport, EuroLeague TV	Pts: Smart 26; Rebs: Smart 9 Asts: Kullamäe, Hill 3 PIR: Smart 29	Report	Pts: Wiltjer 19; Rebs: Tessitori 6 Asts: Candi 4 PIR: Tessitori 20	Arena: BTarena; Attendance: 6,147; Referees: Piotr Pastusiak, Dragan Porobic, Joaquin Garcia Gonzales

14 October 2026 3	Šiauliai (Lithuania)	75–94	(Romania) U-BT Cluj-Napoca	Šiauliai
18:30 (UTC+3)	Scoring by quarter: 26-16, 14-25, 20-25, 15-28
Prima Sport, EuroLeague TV	Pts: Caffey 13; Rebs: Jarumbauskas 5 Asts: McKnight 6 PIR: Caffey 13	Report	Pts: Smart 20; Rebs: Plavšić 8 Asts: Livingston 10; PIR: Plavšić 25	Arena: Šiauliai Arena; Attendance: 2,041; Referees: Guido Giovannetti, Denis Hadzic, Matteo Lucotti

21 October 2026 4	U-BT Cluj-Napoca (Romania)	72–89	(United Kingdom) London Lions	Cluj-Napoca
19:00 (UTC+3)	Scoring by quarter: 22-21, 15-19, 18-24, 17-25
Prima Sport, EuroLeague TV	Pts: Smart, Plavšić, Hill 14; Rebs: Plavšić 8 Asts: Livingston 9 PIR: Plavšić 18	Report	Pts: Kennedy 16; Rebs: Jones, Scott 5 Asts: Soluade 7 PIR: Jones 23	Arena: BTarena; Attendance: 5,987; Referees: Igor Dragojevic, Franko Gracin, Marko Mustapic

27 October 2026 5	Skyliners Frankfurt (Germany)	vs.	(Romania) U-BT Cluj-Napoca	Frankfurt
19:30 (UTC+1)
EuroLeague TV		Report		Arena: Süwag Energie ARENA

4 November 2026 6	La Laguna Tenerife (Spain)	vs.	(Romania) U-BT Cluj-Napoca	La Laguna
20:00 (UTC+0)
EuroLeague TV		Report		Arena: Santiago Martín

10 November 2026 7	U-BT Cluj-Napoca (Romania)	vs.	(Turkey) Türk Telekom	Cluj-Napoca
19:00 (UTC+2)
EuroLeague TV		Report		Arena: BTarena

18 November 2026 8	U-BT Cluj-Napoca (Romania)	vs.	(Italy) Maxima Roma	Cluj-Napoca
19:00 (UTC+2)
EuroLeague TV		Report		Arena: BTarena

9 December 2026 9	Reyer Venezia (Italy)	vs.	(Romania) U-BT Cluj-Napoca	Venice
20:00 (UTC+1)
EuroLeague TV		Report		Arena: Palasport Giuseppe Taliercio

16 December 2026 10	U-BT Cluj-Napoca (Romania)	vs.	(Lithuania) Šiauliai	Cluj-Napoca
19:00 (UTC+2)
EuroLeague TV		Report		Arena: BTarena

23 December 2026 11	London Lions (United Kingdom)	vs.	(Romania) U-BT Cluj-Napoca	London
19:30 (UTC+0)
EuroLeague TV		Report		Arena: Copper Box Arena

30 December 2026 12	U-BT Cluj-Napoca (Romania)	vs.	(Germany) Skyliners Frankfurt	Cluj-Napoca
19:00 (UTC+2)
EuroLeague TV		Report		Arena: BTarena

6 January 2027 13	U-BT Cluj-Napoca (Romania)	vs.	(Spain) La Laguna Tenerife	Cluj-Napoca
19:00 (UTC+2)
EuroLeague TV		Report		Arena: BTarena

13 January 2026 14	Türk Telekom (Turkey)	vs.	(Romania) U-BT Cluj-Napoca	Ankara
19:00 (UTC+3)
EuroLeague TV		Report		Arena: Ankara Arena
