= 2020–21 BBL-Pokal =

- Season: 2020–21
- Dates: 17 October – 16 May 2021
- Games played: 20
- Teams: 16

Regular season
- Season MVP: Vladimir Lučić

Finals
- Champions: Bayern Munich (3rd title)
- Runners-up: Alba Berlin

The 2020–21 BBL-Pokal was the 54th season of the BBL-Pokal, the domestic cup competition of the Basketball Bundesliga (BBL).

Bayern Munich defeated Alba Berlin in the final to win their third title.

== Participants ==
The sixteen highest placed teams from the 2019–20 Basketball Bundesliga, without the relegated teams and promoted teams, qualified for the tournament.

== Format ==
The format was changed for this season because of the COVID-19 pandemic. The 16 teams were split into four qualification tournaments of four teams (North and South). The winner of each tournament qualified for the final four.

== Standings ==
Pos	Team	Pld	W	L	PF	PA	PD	Pts	Qualification
1	Bayern Munich	21	19	2	1788	1555	+233	38	Qualified
2	MHP Riesen Ludwigsburg	21	17	4	1816	1655	+161	34	Qualified
3	Crailsheim Merlins	21	15	6	1890	1772	+118	30	Qualified
4	Alba Berlin	19	14	5	1774	1551	+223	28	Qualified
5	EWE Baskets Oldenburg	20	13	7	1687	1663	+24	26	Qualified
6	Rasta Vechta	21	12	9	1695	1718	−23	24	Qualified
7	Brose Bamberg	21	12	9	1734	1648	+86	24	Qualified
8	s.Oliver Würzburg	21	11	10	1755	1785	−30	22	Qualified
9	BG Göttingen	21	11	10	1727	1788	−61	22	Qualified
10	ratiopharm Ulm	20	10	10	1748	1709	+39	20	Qualified
11	Basketball Löwen Braunschweig	20	9	11	1791	1831	−40	18	Qualified
12	Medi Bayreuth	21	9	12	1811	1811	0	18	Qualified
13	Gießen 46ers	20	6	14	1694	1785	−91	12	Qualified
14	Skyliners Frankfurt	21	6	15	1579	1692	−113	12	Qualified
15	Telekom Baskets Bonn	20	4	16	1687	1824	−137	8	Qualified
16	Mitteldeutscher BC	20	3	17	1791	1949	−158	6	Qualified
17	Hamburg Towers	20	3	17	1624	1855	−231	6	

Source: Beko BBL
Rules for classification: 1) Points; 2) Head-to-head; 3) Points difference; 4) Points scored.

== Round and draw dates ==
Round	Draw	Dates
Qualification tournament	3 September 2020	17–18 October 2020; 24–25 October 2020
Final four	3 September 2020	1–2 November 2020

== Qualification tournament ==
The teams were split into a "North" and "South" zone and played a four-team tournament at a pre-selected venue. The draw was held on 3 September 2020.

The first placed team in each tournament qualified for the final four.

Due to the COVID-19 pandemic, some games were played behind closed doors.

=== Group A ===
Pos	Team	Pld	W	L	PF	PA	PD	Pts	Qualification
1	Alba Berlin	3	2	1	193	185	+8	4 (Note: Telekom Baskets Bonn 82–90 Alba Berlin)	Semifinals
2	Telekom Baskets Bonn (H)	3	2	1	263	245	+18	4	
3	Basketball Löwen Braunschweig	3	1	2	239	282	−43	2	
4	Baskets Oldenburg	3	0	3	164	227	−63	0	

Source: BBL
Rules for classification: 1) points; 2) head-to-head points; 3) head-to-head points difference; 4) head-to-head number of points scored.
(H) Hosts
Notes:

17 October 2020
18:00

Boxscore

Telekom Baskets Bonn	90–76	Baskets Oldenburg
Scoring by quarter: 21–17, 23–19, 22–17, 24–23
Pts: Leon Kratzer 21; Rebs: Leon Kratzer 7 Asts: Josh Hagins 4		Pts: Rašid Mahalbašić 20; Rebs: Philipp Schwethelm 8 Asts: Sebastian Herrera 4

Telekom Dome, Bonn
Referees: Anne Panther, Moritz Reiter, Dominik Bejaoui

24 October 2020
15:00

Boxscore

Baskets Oldenburg	88–97	Basketball Löwen Braunschweig
Scoring by quarter: 32–23, 21–28, 13–22, 22–24
Pts: Zach Smith 15; Rebs: Zach Smith 5 Asts: Tayler Persons 7		Pts: Michele Vitali 21; Rebs: David Kravish 14; Asts: three players 5

Telekom Dome, Bonn
Referees: Christof Madinger, Moritz Krüper, Nikolas Brendel

1 November 2020 (Note: The game, originally scheduled for 25 October 2020, was postponed after one positive COVID-19 test by a Telekom Baskets Bonn player.)
18:00

Boxscore

Telekom Baskets Bonn	91–79	Basketball Löwen Braunschweig
Scoring by quarter: 29–21, 20–18, 25–23, 17–17
Pts: Deividas Gailius 25; Rebs: Josh Hagins 9 Asts: Josh Hagins 6		Pts: Bryon Allen 22; Rebs: Bryon Allen, Gavin Schilling 6 Asts: Lukas Meisner 5

Telekom Dome, Bonn
Referees: Neša Kovačević, Moritz Krüper, Christian Theis

10 November 2020 (Note: The game, originally scheduled for 24 October 2020, was postponed after several positive COVID-19 tests by Alba Berlin players.)
19:00

Boxscore

Telekom Baskets Bonn	82–90	Alba Berlin
Scoring by quarter: 27–21, 13–18, 18–24, 24–27
Pts: Deividas Gailius 20; Rebs: Leon Kratzer 9 Asts: Josh Hagins 6		Pts: Lammers, Lô 16; Rebs: Johannes Thiemann 8 Asts: Maodo Lô 6

Telekom Dome, Bonn
Referees: Martin Matip, Neša Kovačević, Dominik Bejaoui

20 January 2021 (Note: The game, originally scheduled for 31 December 2020, was postponed after the Braunschweig team had to go into quarantine.)
19:00

Boxscore

Alba Berlin	103–63	Basketball Löwen Braunschweig
Scoring by quarter: 21–18, 25–18, 30–13, 27–14
Pts: Lô, Schneider 16; Rebs: Olinde, Schneider 6 Asts: Peyton Siva 6		Pts: Peterka, Schilling 13; Rebs: Gavin Schilling 9 Asts: three players 4

Telekom Dome, Bonn
Referees: Robert Lottermoser, Tamer Arik, Nermin Hodžić

Cancelled (Note: The game, originally scheduled for 25 October 2020, was postponed after several positive COVID-19 tests by Alba Berlin players.)

Alba Berlin	vs.	Baskets Oldenburg

Telekom Dome, Bonn

The game was called off after the standings were decided priot to the game. As a result, both teams lost 0–40.

=== Group B ===
Pos	Team	Pld	W	L	PF	PA	PD	Pts	Qualification
1	BG Göttingen	3	3	0	301	270	+31	6	Semifinals
2	Skyliners Frankfurt	3	2	1	239	229	+10	4	
3	Rasta Vechta (H)	3	1	2	266	273	−7	2	
4	Gießen 46ers	3	0	3	274	308	−34	0	

Source: BBL
Rules for classification: 1) points; 2) head-to-head points; 3) head-to-head points difference; 4) head-to-head number of points scored.
(H) Hosts

17 October 2020
18:00

Boxscore

Rasta Vechta	99–85	Gießen 46ers
Scoring by quarter: 25–18, 31–23, 20–18, 23–26
Pts: Herkenhoff, Salumu 20; Rebs: Jordan Barnett 10; Asts: Stefan Peno 6		Pts: Brandon Thomas 19; Rebs: three players 3 Asts: O'Reilly, Rowsey 5

Rasta Dome, Vechta
Referees: Martin Matip, Dennis Sirowi, Zulfikar Oruzgani

18 October 2020
15:00

Boxscore

BG Göttingen	79–64	Skyliners Frankfurt
Scoring by quarter: 21–14, 23–17, 22–17, 13–16
Pts: Gutiérrez, Odiase 14; Rebs: Tai Odiase 10; Asts: Luke Nelson 8		Pts: Jón Axel Guðmundsson 20; Rebs: Moore, Völler 7 Asts: Quantez Robertson 4

Rasta Dome, Vechta
Referees: Martin Matip, Neša Kovačević, Zulfikar Oruzgani

24 October 2020
15:00

Boxscore

Skyliners Frankfurt	86–70	Gießen 46ers
Scoring by quarter: 18–19, 28–18, 19–19, 21–14
Pts: Matt Mobley 29; Rebs: Jón Axel Guðmundsson 8 Asts: Jón Axel Guðmundsson 8		Pts: Brandon Bowman 17; Rebs: Brandon Bowman 9 Asts: Liam O'Reilly 5

Rasta Dome, Vechta
Referees: Gentian Cici, Konstantin Simonow, Stefan Fingerling

24 October 2020
20:30

Boxscore

Rasta Vechta	87–99	BG Göttingen
Scoring by quarter: 18–33, 20–29, 20–19, 29–18
Pts: Will Vorhees 27; Rebs: Will Vorhees 9 Asts: Peno, Salumu 3		Pts: Mathis Mönninghoff 22; Rebs: Tai Odiase 7 Asts: Luke Nelson 10

Rasta Dome, Vechta
Referees: Zulfikar Oruzgani, Dennis Sirowi, Patrick Müller

25 October 2020
15:00

Boxscore

Rasta Vechta	80–89	Skyliners Frankfurt
Scoring by quarter: 15–23, 21–24, 16–17, 28–25
Pts: Stefan Peno 16; Rebs: Stefan Peno 6 Asts: Jean Salumu 4		Pts: Jón Axel Guðmundsson 22; Rebs: Kamari Murphy 8 Asts: Jón Axel Guðmundsson 5

Rasta Dome, Vechta
Referees: Zulfikar Oruzgani, Konstantin Simonow, Patrick Müller

25 October 2020
20:30

Boxscore

Gießen 46ers	119–123 (OT)	BG Göttingen
Scoring by quarter: 24–27, 25–26, 30–26, 29–29, Overtime: 11–15
Pts: Johannes Richter 25; Rebs: Brandon Bowman 10; Asts: Bjarne Kraushaar 10		Pts: Galen Robinson Jr. 21; Rebs: Mathis Mönninghoff 7 Asts: Luke Nelson 8

Rasta Dome, Vechta
Referees: Gentian Cici, Dennis Sirowi, Stefan Fingerling

=== Group C ===
Pos	Team	Pld	W	L	PF	PA	PD	Pts	Qualification
1	ratiopharm Ulm (H)	3	2	1	237	221	+16	4 (Note: Ulm 2 Pts, +11 PD; Ludwigsburg 2 Pts, +7 PD; Bamberg 2 Pts, −18 PD)	Semifinals
2	Riesen Ludwigsburg	3	2	1	249	231	+18	4	
3	Brose Bamberg	3	2	1	235	232	+3	4	
4	s.Oliver Würzburg	3	0	3	210	247	−37	0	

Source: BBL
Rules for classification: 1) points; 2) head-to-head points; 3) head-to-head points difference; 4) head-to-head number of points scored.
(H) Hosts
Notes:

17 October 2020
15:00

Boxscore

ratiopharm Ulm	65–74	Brose Bamberg
Scoring by quarter: 17–15, 12–20, 20–20, 16–19
Pts: Troy Caupain 14; Rebs: Dylan Osetkowski 9 Asts: Patrick Heckmann 4		Pts: Tyler Larson 16; Rebs: Fieler, Kravish 7 Asts: Tyler Larson 6

Stadthalle Weißenfels, Weißenfels
Referees: Robert Lottermoser, Steve Bittner, Oliver Krause

18 October 2020
15:00

Boxscore

Riesen Ludwigsburg	78–67	s.Oliver Würzburg
Scoring by quarter: 18–18, 23–19, 16–21, 21–9
Pts: Brown Jr., Harris 18; Rebs: Jaleen Smith 11; Asts: Jaleen Smith 7		Pts: Tayler Persons 12; Rebs: Mark Ogden 7 Asts: Tyson Ward 5

Stadthalle Weißenfels, Weißenfels
Referees: Carsten Straube, Oliver Krause, Steve Bittner

24 October 2020
15:00

Boxscore

s.Oliver Würzburg	68–89	Brose Bamberg
Scoring by quarter: 20–23, 18–22, 18–17, 12–27
Pts: Nathan Boothe 19; Rebs: Rašid Mahalbašić 7 Asts: Phil Pressey 4		Pts: Bryon Allen 18; Rebs: Bryon Allen 9 Asts: James Robinson 5

Arena Ulm/Neu-Ulm, Ulm
Referees: Moritz Reiter, Enrico Streit, Benedikt Loder

24 October 2020
20:30

Boxscore

ratiopharm Ulm	92–72	Riesen Ludwigsburg
Scoring by quarter: 24–18, 18–15, 26–26, 24–13
Pts: Dylan Osetkowski 18; Rebs: Aric Holman 9 Asts: Troy Caupain 6		Pts: Jaleen Smith 17; Rebs: Jaleen Smith 5 Asts: Hulls, Smith 4

Arena Ulm/Neu-Ulm, Ulm
Referees: Anne Panther, Armin Mutapčić, Andreas Bohn

25 October 2020
15:00

Boxscore

ratiopharm Ulm	80–75	s.Oliver Würzburg
Scoring by quarter: 22–15, 14–13, 15–24, 29–23
Pts: John Petrucelli 19; Rebs: Aric Holman 7 Asts: Aric Holman 4		Pts: Micah Downs 17; Rebs: Micah Downs 7 Asts: Tayler Persons 5

Arena Ulm/Neu-Ulm, Ulm
Referees: Moritz Reiter, Enrico Streit, Armin Mutapčić

25 October 2020
20:30

Boxscore

Brose Bamberg	72–99	Riesen Ludwigsburg
Scoring by quarter: 21–24, 8–19, 21–16, 22–40
Pts: Chase Fieler 21; Rebs: David Kravish 8 Asts: Tyler Larson 8		Pts: Barry Brown Jr. 30; Rebs: Jonas Wohlfarth-Bottermann 6 Asts: Jaleen Smith 4

Arena Ulm/Neu-Ulm, Ulm
Referees: Anne Panther, Christof Madinger, Andreas Bohn

=== Group D ===
Pos	Team	Pld	W	L	PF	PA	PD	Pts	Qualification
1	Bayern Munich	3	2	1	266	218	+48	4 (Note: Mitteldeutscher BC 60–97 Bayern Munich)	Semifinals
2	Mitteldeutscher BC (H)	3	2	1	282	305	−23	4	
3	Crailsheim Merlins	3	1	2	238	256	−18	2 (Note: Medi Bayreuth 77–81 Crailsheim Merlins)	
4	Medi Bayreuth	3	1	2	286	293	−7	2	

Source: BBL
Rules for classification: 1) points; 2) head-to-head points; 3) head-to-head points difference; 4) head-to-head number of points scored.
(H) Hosts
Notes:

17 October 2020
20:30

Boxscore

Mitteldeutscher BC	99–94	Crailsheim Merlins
Scoring by quarter: 30–18, 22–26, 28–22, 19–28
Pts: Shavon Coleman 27; Rebs: Kyndahl Hill 10; Asts: Roko Rogić 12		Pts: Trae Bell-Haynes 27; Rebs: Trae Bell-Haynes 6 Asts: Trae Bell-Haynes 8

Stadthalle Weißenfels, Weißenfels
Referees: Carsten Straube, Konstantin Simonow, Tamer Arik

18 October 2020
20:30

Boxscore

Bayern Munich	89–95	Medi Bayreuth
Scoring by quarter: 22–20, 18–22, 26–20, 23–33
Pts: Paul Zipser 18; Rebs: three players 5 Asts: Žan Mark Šiško 6		Pts: Frank Bartley 25; Rebs: Ryan Woolridge 6 Asts: Ryan Woolridge 8

Stadthalle Weißenfels, Weißenfels
Referees: Robert Lottermoser, Konstantin Simonow, Tamer Arik

25 October 2020
18:00

Boxscore

Mitteldeutscher BC	60–97	Bayern Munich
Scoring by quarter: 14–31, 14–18, 19–27, 13–21
Pts: Michał Michalak 17; Rebs: Sergio Kerusch 7 Asts: Michał Michalak 7		Pts: T. J. Bray 19; Rebs: Matej Rudan 8 Asts: Žan Mark Šiško 10

Stadthalle Weißenfels, Weißenfels
Referees: Robert Lottermoser, Steve Bittner, Nermin Hodžić

26 October 2020
20:30

Boxscore

Crailsheim Merlins	63–80	Bayern Munich
Scoring by quarter: 16–21, 12–23, 20–17, 15–19
Pts: Trae Bell-Haynes 16; Rebs: Jamuni McNeace 9 Asts: Trae Bell-Haynes 8		Pts: Paul Zipser 16; Rebs: Nick Weiler-Babb 9 Asts: three players 4

Stadthalle Weißenfels, Weißenfels
Referees: Carsten Straube, Steve Bittner, Oliver Krause

11 November 2020 (Note: The game, originally scheduled for 24 October 2020, was postponed after several positive COVID-19 tests by Medi Bayreuth players.)
19:00

Boxscore

Mitteldeutscher BC	123–114	Medi Bayreuth
Scoring by quarter: 39–21, 27–27, 32–30, 25–36
Pts: Michal Michalak 32; Rebs: Brembly, Hooker 5 Asts: Quinton Hooker 12		Pts: Frank Bartley 25; Rebs: Pardon, Tiby 6 Asts: Bastian Doreth 6

Stadthalle Weißenfels, Weißenfels
Referees: Konstantin Simonow, Tamer Arik, Nermin Hodžić

12 November 2020 (Note: The game, originally scheduled for 25 October 2020, was postponed after several positive COVID-19 tests by Medi Bayreuth players.)
19:00

Boxscore

Medi Bayreuth	77–81	Crailsheim Merlins
Scoring by quarter: 12–19, 23–21, 23–16, 19–25
Pts: Ryan Woolridge 19; Rebs: four players 5 Asts: Osvaldas Olisevičius 5		Pts: Highsmith, Radosavljević 14; Rebs: Jeremy Jones 7 Asts: Trae Bell-Haynes 10

Stadthalle Weißenfels, Weißenfels
Referees: Steve Bittner, Nermin Hodžić, Tamer Arik

== Final four ==
The final four was postponed on 21 October 2020. It was scheduled to take place on 17 and April 2021, but was postponed again. The games took place on 15 and 16 May 2021.

=== Bracket ===
Semi-finals
ratiopharm Ulm	102
Bayern Munich (OT)	104
BG Göttingen	96
Alba Berlin	112

Final
Bayern Munich	85
Alba Berlin	79

=== Semifinals ===
15 May 2021 (Note: The games, originally scheduled for 17 and 18 April 2021, were postponed after a positive COVID-19 test by a Göttingen player.)
16:00

Boxscore

ratiopharm Ulm	102–104 (OT)	Bayern Munich
Scoring by quarter: 18–26, 18–23, 32–20, 16–15, Overtime: 7–7, 11–13
Pts: Troy Caupain 24; Rebs: Troy Caupain 11; Asts: Troy Caupain 5		Pts: Vladimir Lučić 24; Rebs: JaJuan Johnson 13; Asts: Wade Baldwin IV 9

Audi Dome, Munich
Attendance: 0 (Note: The games were played behind closed doors.)
Referees: Robert Lottermoser, Clemens Fritz, Christof Madinger

15 May 2021
19:30

Boxscore

BG Göttingen	96–112	Alba Berlin
Scoring by quarter: 14–24, 35–31, 19–28, 28–29
Pts: Rihards Lomažs 23; Rebs: Tai Odiase 5 Asts: Luke Nelson 8		Pts: Johannes Thiemann 24; Rebs: Sikma, Thiemann 6 Asts: Jayson Granger 7

Audi Dome, Munich
Attendance: 0
Referees: Anne Panther, Martin Matip, Steve Bittner

=== Final ===
16 May 2021

Boxscore

Bayern Munich	85–79	Alba Berlin
Scoring by quarter: 17–29, 24–10, 24–19, 20–21
Pts: Paul Zipser 18; Rebs: Žan Mark Šiško 6 Asts: Seeley, Šiško 4		Pts: Jayson Granger 17; Rebs: Olinde, Thiemann 6 Asts: four players 3

Audi Dome, Munich
Attendance: 0
Referees: Anne Panther, Martin Matip, Steve Bittner

== See also ==
- 2019–20 Basketball Bundesliga
