= Klaus Perwas =

German basketball player and coach

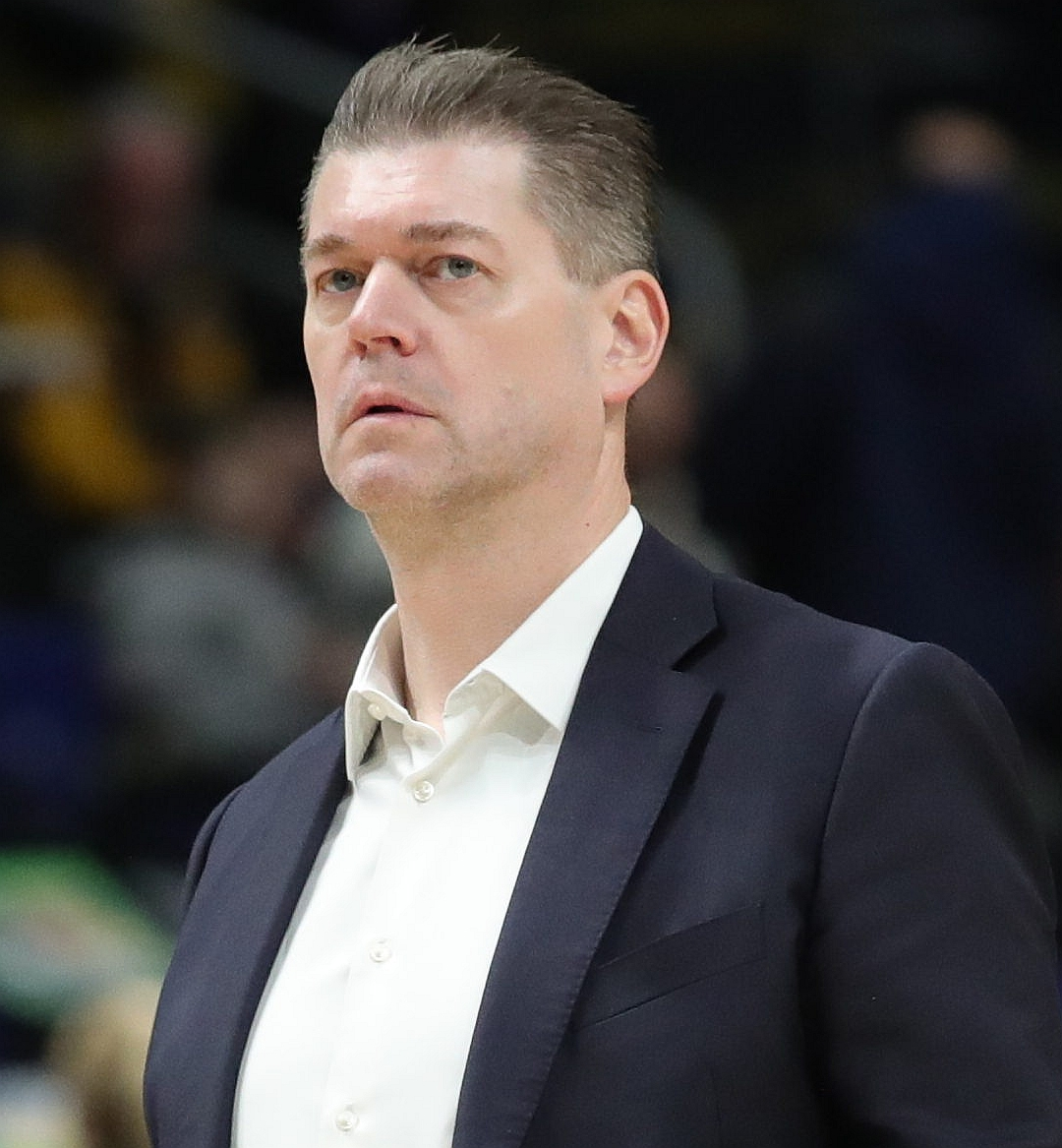
- Perwas with Skyliners Frankfurt in 2023

Fraport Skyliners
- Position: Head coach
- League: Basketball Bundesliga; EuroCup

Personal information
- Born: 8 March 1971 (age 55) Osnabrück, Germany

Career information
- Playing career: 1992–2010
- Coaching career: 2000–present

Career history

Playing
- 1995–1999: Baskets Bonn

Coaching
- 2000–2002: Baskets Bonn (assistant)
- 2002–2005: Dragons Rhöndorf (assistant)
- 2005–2006: Dragons Rhöndorf (head coach)
- 2008–2023: Skyliners Frankfurt (assistant)
- 2023: Skyliners Frankfurt (head coach)
- 2023–2025: Skyliners Frankfurt (assistant)
- 2025–present: Skyliners Frankfurt

Klaus Perwas (born 8 March 1971) is a German basketball coach and former player.

== Playing career ==
In the late 80s, Perwas was considered as a major talent as he capped for Germany's junior national teams on many occasion. His final breakthrough happened when he joined the Baskets Bonn in 1995. There, as the team's playmaker, he became a member of the German national basketball team. Altogether, Perwas played professional basketball for the German teams SG Bramsche-Osnabrück (1992–94), SSV Ulm 1846 (1994–1995) and Telekom Baskets Bonn (1995–1999). His playing career ended prematurely after serious knee-injuries.

== Coaching career ==
Perwas joined the coaching staff of the Telekom Baskets Bonn in 2000. Later, he also coached for the Dragons Rhoendorf and Skyliners Frankfurt.

== German national team ==
Perwas played 12 games for the Germany national basketball team. His most notable performance was 17 points against Greece.
