= William Christmas (basketball) =

American basketball player (born 1996)

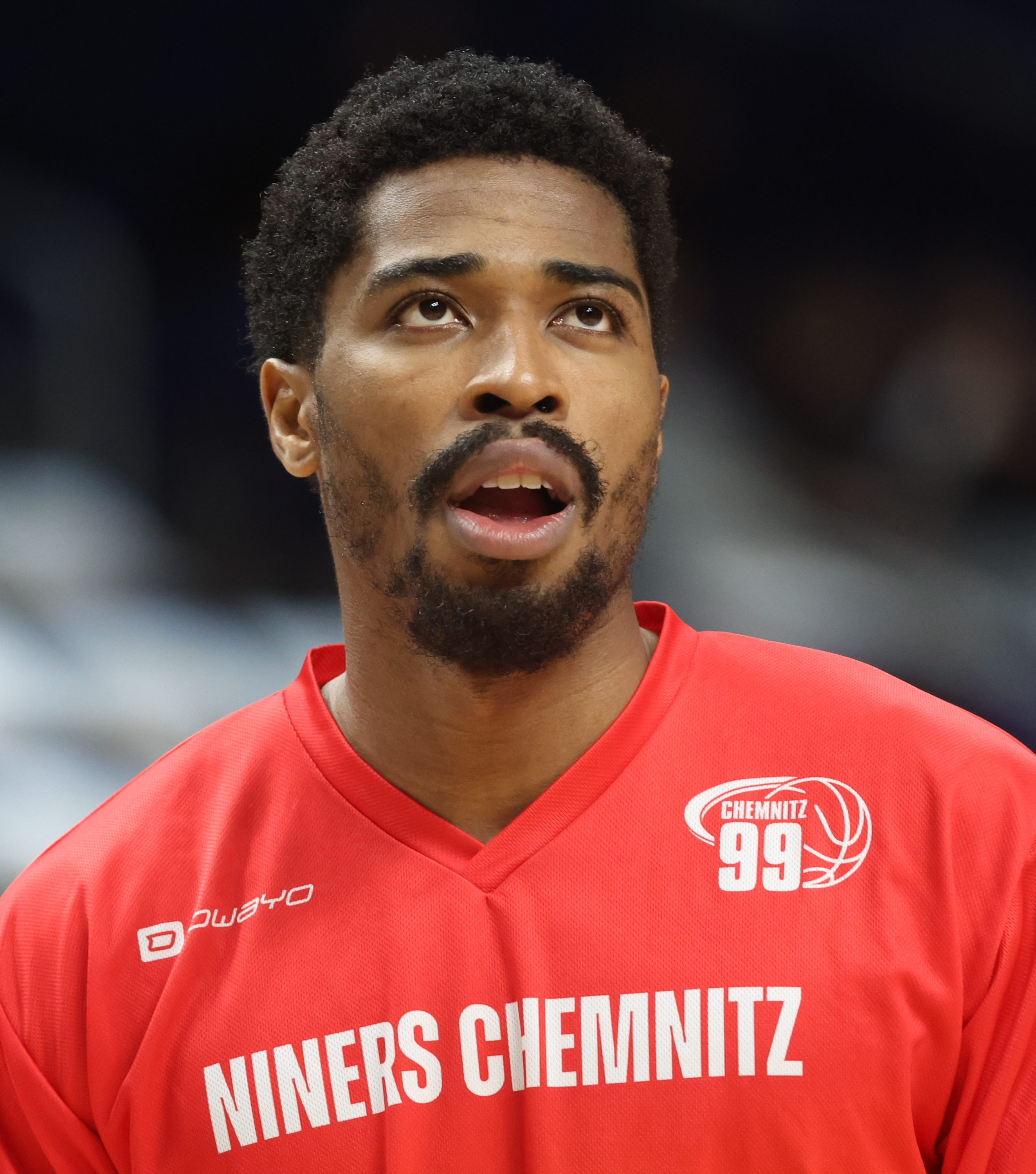
- Christmas playing for Niners Chemnitz in 2024

No. 8 – Fraport Skyliners
- Position: Small forward
- League: Basketball Bundesliga; EuroCup

Personal information
- Born: December 8, 1996 (age 29) Oceanside, California, U.S.
- Listed height: 6 ft 5 in (1.96 m)
- Listed weight: 200 lb (91 kg)

Career information
- High school: Oceanside (Oceanside, California)
- College: Cal Poly Pomona (2016–2020)
- NBA draft: 2020: undrafted
- Playing career: 2021–present

Career history
- 2021: Dragons Rhöndorf
- 2022–2023: Musel Pikes
- 2023: Artland Dragons
- 2023–2024: Hamburg Towers
- 2024–2025: Niners Chemnitz
- 2025: Limoges CSP
- 2025–present: Fraport Skyliners

Career highlights
- 3× First-team All-CCAA (2018–2020); CCAA Freshman of the Year (2017)

William Christmas (born December 8, 1996) is an American professional basketball player for Skyliners Frankfurt of the Basketball Bundesliga (BBL) and the EuroCup.

== College career ==
Christmas was the only player in the history of the Cal Poly Pomona Broncos to be in the top 10 in the statistical categories of points, rebounds, and assists. Along the way, he also garnered many distinctions that became a testimony of his performance on the court

== Professional career ==
=== Dragons Rhoendorf (2021-2022) ===
After going undrafted in the 2020 NBA draft, Christmas has agreed to a deal with the German team, Dragons Rhöndorf, for the 2021–22 season. In his first ever professional game, he recorded 19 points and 10 rebounds in a 74–107 loss to WWE Muenster. He followed up his performance with 18 points, 9 rebounds and 5 steals as they were defeated by 40 points by the SC Wedel, 44–84.

=== BC Musel Pikes (2022) ===
On November 30, 2021, it was reported by the team in their official website that Christmas would be leaving their team to sign for a team in Luxembourg. In his departing remarks, he commended the fans of Rhondorf for their special energy that they bring every game. He officially signed with the Musel Pikes of the Total League on January 9, 2022.

=== Veolia Towers Hamburg (2023-2024) ===
On July 4, 2023, he signed with Hamburg Towers of the Basketball Bundesliga.

=== Niners Chemnitz (2024-2025) ===
On August 14, 2024, Christmas signed with Niners Chemnitz of the Basketball Bundesliga.

=== Limoges CSP Elite (2025) ===
On February 20, 2025, Christmas signed with Limoges CSP of LNB Élite. He started the season with Niners Chemnitz of the Basketball Bundesliga and averaged 8.7 points, 4.3 rebounds, and 2.3 assists per game.

=== Skyliners Frankfurt (2025–present) ===
On August 5, 2025, he signed with Skyliners Frankfurt of the Basketball Bundesliga (BBL).

== Personal life ==
During his four-year college career, Christmas was able to pursue and finish his college degree in Kinesiology. In an interview, he stated that it is important for a person to pursue a college degree despite their involvement in athletic programs. He also stated that his idols that he looked after and patterned his playing style to, were NBA legends Michael Jordan, LeBron James, Kobe Bryant, Magic Johnson, and Kareem Abdul-Jabbar. His favorite NBA team is the Los Angeles Lakers, bestowing homage to the greatness of the team and its impacts on his home state.
