= Joe Whelton =

American professional basketball coach (born 1956)

Joseph Whelton (born February 15, 1956) is an American professional basketball coach. He played at the University of Connecticut and has spent most of his coaching career overseas.

== Career ==
A native of East Hartford, Connecticut, Whelton played at the University of Connecticut from 1974 to 1978. He began his coaching career at Wethersfield High School, followed by a stint as assistant coach at the University of Hartford men’s basketball team.

At age 27, he took over the head coaching job at Warrington Vikings in England, who later became Manchester United Basketball. Whelton guided the Manchester team to British championships in 1985 and 1986. In 1988, he coached Manchester to the quarterfinals in the Korac Cup. Additionally, he served as head coach of the British men’s national team during the qualifiers to the 1988 Olympic Games in Seoul. Coming in sixth, the Brits just fell short in earning a spot in the Olympic tournament.

During Whelton’s tenure at Fribourg Olympic (1988–92), the club won a Swiss national championship. In 1992, he took over as head coach of another Swiss team, Pallacanestro Bellinzona, and led them to three straight national championships (1993, 1994, 1995) and four titles in the Swiss cup-competition (1993, 1994, 1995, 1996).

In 1996, he returned to Manchester for a short stint and then moved to Germany, where he served as head coach of four different teams in the Basketball Bundesliga: He coached Brandt Hagen in 1997-98, led Rhöndorfer TV to the Bundesliga semifinals in 1998-99, had a four-year tenure at MTV Gießen (1999-2003) and worked as head coach for TBB Trier between 2003 and December 2007.

After parting ways with the Trier team, Whelton returned to the United States, serving as sports director of YMCA Venice and head girls varsity basketball coach at Venice High School.

In January 2010, he was named head coach of the Lugano Tigers in Switzerland. During his time at the helm, the Tigers won the Swiss national championship in 2010 and 2011 as well as the cup-title in 2011.

In the 2011-12 season, Whelton served as head men's basketball coach at the State College of Florida and then took up an offer from China, signing with the Foshan Long Lions. In 2013, Whelton was back in Florida, serving as head boys basketball coach at the Sarasota Christian School until October 2014.

In the 2015-16 campaign, Whelton worked as head coach for the Liaoning Jiebao Hunters of the Chinese Basketball Association. He stopped coaching in 2016 and started a business in Florida, working as a recruiter for companies.
