= Dragons Rhöndorf =

- League: ProB
- Founded: 1912; 114 years ago
- History: Rhoendorfer TV 1912 (1912–1996); TV Tatami Rhoendorf (1997–1999); SER Rhoendorf (1999–2002); 2BA Dragons Rhoendorf (2002–2004); SOBA Dragons Rhoendorf (2004–2011); Dragons Rhoendorf (2011–present)
- Arena: Menzenberger Sporthalle
- Capacity: 1,500
- Location: Bad Honnef, North Rhine-Westphalia, Germany
- Head coach: Thomas Adelt
- Website: www.dragons.de

Dragons Rhoendorf is a professional basketball club based in Bad Honnef, North Rhine-Westphalia, Germany. The team had its most successful years from 1995 to 1999 when it played in the Basketball Bundesliga and reached the semi-finals in 1999. Since then, the club has voluntarily moved down to the third highest national division, Pro B, where the Dragons still compete today.

== History ==
=== Beginning years (1912–1995) ===
The team started out as Rhöndorfer TV.

=== Alternating path between ProA and Pro B (1995–2010) ===
In 1995, the then called TV Tatami Rhöndorf team moved up from the second League north to the Basketball Bundesliga, Germany's prime basketball league. In 1999, the licensed was transferred to the Skyliners Frankfurt while Rhöndorf used the license it gained from EnBW Ludwigsburg and stayed in the 2nd league. After a renewed athletic ascent, the license was passed on again. Beneficiaries were this time RheinEnergy Cologne and later Cologne 99ers. For the 2007–08 season, Dragons Rhöndorf qualified for the newly formed 2nd-Bundesliga ProA and secured a fourth-place finish. Despite that, the club elected to return voluntarily to the ProB (third tier) in order to refocus on youth development. They pursue this target for the season 2006/2007 also together with the Telekom Baskets Bonn. Under the name SG Bonn/Rhöndorf both clubs line up together in the NBBL. In the 2008/2009 season the Dragons finished in fourth place and missed promotion to the ProA.

During the 2009/2010 season the Dragons announced that the longtime sponsor Franz Ludwig Solzbacher has ceased his engagement with the end of the season. So the Dragons start in the season 2010/2011 without the addition SOBA in the name. Also it was founded a new GmbH. The Dragons Rhöndorf Marketing GmbH adopt the license at the end of the season 2009/2010 and is the new carrier of the game operation of the Dragons. The general manager of the new GmbH becomes the manager of Dragons Michael Wichterich.

The 2009/2010 season became one of the most successful seasons in club history. With 26 wins and 4 defeats the Soba Dragons became sovereign champions of the ProB and secure the right for the promotion in the ProA. For this, Eric Detlev was awarded as coach of the year of the ProB. During the summer they tried to protect feverishly the required budget for the ProA and it was successful. But the face of the team changed a lot. Longtime, established player left the club, including Christopher Rojik, Johannes Lange and Jürgen Malbeck. Also it was not possible to hold idol of the public DeUndraeSpraggins. With a strong younger team they wanted to try to establish the club again in the ProA. But already a matchday before the end of the season it was clear that the Dragons would miss the place in the ProA. After a 75:79 defeat against Würzburg after double extension stood the descent firm. Even returning DeUndraeSpraggins could not change that.

=== ProB, Pro A and again ProB (2011–present) ===
Due to the license withdrawal against USC Freiburg and the GiroLive-Ballers Osnabrück the Dragons received their start right in the ProA for 2011/2012 first back. However, at the end of June 2011, those responsible announced that the Dragons would retire to the ProB. Financial aspects were responsible for this. There the younger team was able to establish itself in the course of the season and reached the end of the regular season 5th place of the south relay. In the play-offs the Dragons succumbed the SGBraunschweig in two games and bowed out in the round of sixteen. Shortly thereafter followed the separation of coach Eric Detlev after over 10 years working for the Dragons. A reason for the separation were increasingly different views on the orientation of the club, but also the request for new impulses for the teams and the concept of the Dragons.

In 2012 Boris Kaminski was introduced as a new head coach and sports director. Kaminski previously worked for the Hertener Löwen. The first season under Boris Kaminski supervision finished the Dragons in the first place 1 in the south relay with 19 wins and 3 losses. In the first round of the play-offs, the Dragons played against the BSW Sixers from Sandersdorf and also bowed out due to injury concerns in the first round. For the season 2013/2014 returned with Fabian Thüligaidol of the public back to the Dragons, after he had previously dissolved his contract with the Telekom Baskets Bonn. The team reached the 2014 play-offs with 12 wins and 10 losses in the regular season. Rival in the round of sixteen was the former Bundesliga team Schwelmer Baskets. Against the baskets, the Dragons finally bowed out with 1:2 in the first round. Shortly after leaving the play-offs, the Dragons announced the contract extension with head coach Boris Kaminski. He received a new contract until summer 2016.

For the 2014/2015 season returned a former youth player of the Dragons Savo Milovic. Similarly the talents Kostja Mushidi, Alexander Angerer and Alexander Möller were appointed to the ProB squad of Rhöndorf. In the course of the season followed the separation of sports manager Sebastian Schmidt due to different views in the sporting and economic sphere of the club. Athletic established the Dragons in the top field of ProB-South and could finish the regular season in third place.

In the play-offs the team of Boris Kaminski played in the round of sixteen against the Uni-Reisen Leipzig and bowed out with 1:2 and therefore did not survived for the fourth time in a row the first round of the play-offs.

At the end of the season 2014/2015 it became known that the two athletically qualified teams of SC Rist Wedel and the Oldenburger TB would not make use of their right of promotion. After the Uni-ReisenLeipzig renounced the promotion the license went to the Dragons Rhöndorf, which officially announced on May 12, 2015, to compete again in the ProA. After only two wins and 16 defeats in January 2016 head coach Boris Kaminski resigned from his duties. Successor was his former co-coach Christian Mehrens. But even under Mehrens supervision the team did not reached the sporting turn around and the Dragons descended as the bottom of the league again in the ProB. Shortly after the end of the season, the Dragons announced the separation of Christian Mehrens, who received no new contract as a head coach. His predecessor Boris Kaminski returned to the Dragons Rhöndorf as the new general manager.

New head coach for the 2016/2017 season was Matthias Sonnenschein, who previously worked as an assistant coach for the Dragons and as head coach the JBBL team of SG Bonn / Rhöndorf. The season was a real rollercoaster ride and culminated in the final round of the main round in a close final for the last playoff places. Ultimately, the Dragons slipped from seventh to tenth place due to their own loss to the Weißenhorn Youngstars and the parallel triumphs of the LicherBasketBären, the TG s.OliverWürzburg and the Skyliners Frankfurt II and had the first time in the club's history in the ProB relegation round.

With the American Aaron Nelson left the statistically best player of the team before the start of the relegation round, the team management made a change of the coach at the end of March to set the fight another attraction: the Dutchman Thomas Roijakkers, who had been dismissed a month earlier in the likewise relegation-threatened RSV Eintracht (ProB north-relay), replaced Sunshine as a head coach.

Ultimately the Rhöndorfer managed under Roijakkers leadership the league due to a 59–84 away win on the last day of the play-offs at the LicherBasketBären and were in the final table of the relegation round two points in front of the Uni-ReisenLeipzig, which due to a violation of the League statutes during the Playdowns had to accept a deduction of two players.

== Cooperations with other clubs ==
=== Baskets Bonn ===
Several of the Dragons' players get a chance to earn nominations for the Baskets Bonn squad in the Basketball Bundesliga, Germany's prime division, and European cups such as the Basketball Champions League.

During the summer 2017, general manager Boris Kaminski announced his resignation from the Dragons Rhöndorf and switched to a sponsor to free economy after 5 years in the club. His replacement became Alexander Dohms who already worked as the general manager for the club between 2011 and 2012. At the same time Thomas Adelt became the new head coach for the Dragons. He was in the past the second representation for the Telekom Baskets Bonn (1. Regionalleague west).

Another announcement was that the cooperation between Bonn and Rhöndorf should furthermore intensified and the Telekom Baskets Bonn are taking responsibility for the sportive interests from the Dragons Rhöndorf. They want a consistent conceptual planning which includes JBBL and NBBL from the team Bonn/Rhöndorf to reach their goals.

=== Schoss Hagerhof ===
For several years there has been a cooperation with the high school Schloss Hagerhof to facilitate sporting and academic education. Many talented players went to Schloss Hagerhof, lived in the boarding school and graduated there. Schloss Hagerhof has a focus on sports.

== Team 2017/2018 ==
Kader der Dragons Rhöndorf in der Saison 2017/2018

Nr.	Nat.	Name	Geburt	Größe	Info	Letzter Verein
		Guards (PG, SG)				
6	United States	Kameron Taylor	1994	1,98 m		Erdgas Ehingen
11	Germany	Karl Mamady Dia	1996	1,95 m		Telekom Baskets Bonn II
28	Germany	Joe Koschade	1994	1,84 m		Telekom Baskets Bonn II
12	Germany	Fabian Vermum	1996	1,88 m		Tus Brauweiler
5	Germany	Patrick Reusch	1993	1,85 m		Telekom Baskets Bonn II
17	Germany	Lucas Mertz	1994	1,80 m	DL	Telekom Baskets Bonn II
2	Germany	Viktor Frankl-Maus	1993	1,86 m	K	Köln 99ers
3	Germany	David Falkenstein	1997	1,85 m	DL	eigene Jugend
		Forwards (SF, PF)				
7	Canada	Kevin Thomas	1992	2,03 m		Enosis Neon Paralimni
34	Germany	Thomas Michel	1995	2,00 m	DL	Telekomm Baskets Bonn
8	Germany	Valentin Blass	1995	1,97 m	DL	Telekom Baskets Bonn II
10	Germany	Anton Geretzki	1998	1,93 m	DL	SG Bonn / Rhöndorf
13	Germany	Yannick Kneesch	1996	2,04 m	DL	Telekom Baskets Bonn II
37	Latvia	Ronalds Elksnis	1992	2,04m	LV	BK Jelgava
		Centers(C)				
17	Germany	Alexander Möller	1998	2,06 m	DL	SG Bonn / Rhöndorf

=== Coaches ===
Nat.	Name	Position
German	Thomas Adelt	Head coach
German	Max Schwamborn	Co-Trainer

Abk.	Meaning
DL	Double licence with Bonn
NBBL	in the NBBL-Team as well
K	Captain
II	double licence for second team
NT	Nationalteam

=== Change to season 2017/2018 ===
Zugänge: Thomas Adelt (Head coach/Telekom Baskets Bonn II), K.J. Sherrill (Hertener Löwen – not anymore in thesquad), Max Schwamborn (Co-Trainer/RheinStars Köln), Fabian Vermum (TuS Brauweiler), Kameron Taylor (Erdgas Ehingen/Urspringschule), Karl Mamady Dia (Telekom Baskets Bonn II), Ronalds Elksnis (BK Jelgava/LAT), Joe Koschade (Telekom Baskets Bonn II), Kevin Thomas (Enosis Neon Paralimni/CYP)

Abgänge: Will Trawick(target unknown), Thomas Roijakkers (Head coach/Limburg United), Mike Lucier(target unknown), SavoMilovic (Co-Trainer/Telekom Baskets Bonn II), Florian Wendeler (Rot-Weiss Cuxhaven Basketball), Bastian Winterhalter (2. team), SaschaTratnjek (2. team), K.J. Sherrill (Telekom Baskets Bonn II), Maximilian Fouhy (SV Hagen-Haspe)

== Notable players ==
The following players were before, meanwhile or after their playtime a member of the Dragons A-National players:

- Germany Yassin Idbihi (2001–03)
- Germany Michael Koch 2003/04

Other former well known players are:

- (United States) Steven Key (1996–99)
- (United States) William Christmas (2021–Present)
- (Germany) Florian Koch (2011–13)
- (Sweden) Zaba Bangala

== Coaching history ==
- Germany Michael Laufer – 1993 to 1995
- United States Rob Friedrich – 1995 to 1996
- United States Tom Schneeman – 1996 to 1998
- United States Joe Whelton – 1998 to 1999
- Germany Berthold Bisselik – 1999 to 2005, as well as 2006 to 2007
- Germany Klaus Perwas – 2005 to 2006
- Germany Olaf Stolz – 2007 to 2009
- Germany Eric Detlev – 2009 to 2012
- Germany Boris Kaminski – 2012 to 2016
- Germany Christian Mehrens – 2016
- Germany Matthias Sonnenschein – 2016 to 2017
- Netherlands Thomas Roijakkers – 2017
- Germany Thomas Adelt – since 2017

== Year-by-year ==
- 1994/1995: 1. Place in 2. Bundesliga North-relay (rise in the Basketball-Bundesliga)
- 1995/1996: 11. Place Basketball-Bundesliga
- 1996/1997: 2. Place Basketball-Bundesliga (2:4 bow out in the Play-Off quarter-final against Telekom Baskets Bonn)
- 1997/1998: 5. Place Basketball-Bundesliga (1:4 bow out in the Play-Off quarter final against TBB Trier)
- 1998/1999: 3. Place Basketball-Bundesliga (1:3 bow out in the Play-Off semi-final against Telekom Baskets Bonn, afterwards sale from the licence to the Frankfurt Skyliners)
- 1999/2000: 2. Place in 2. Bundesliga North-relay (3. Place in the riseround)
- 2000/2001: 1Place .in 2. Bundesliga North-relay (start right for the first league became to Köln 99ers delivered)
- 2001/2002: 5. Place in 2. Bundesliga North-relay
- 2002/2003: 9. Place in 2. Bundesliga North-relay
- 2003/2004: 4.Place in 2. Bundesliga North-relay
- 2004/2005: 3.Place in 2. Bundesliga North-relay
- 2005/2006: 6. Place in 2. Bundesliga North-relay
- 2006/2007: 4. Place in 2. Bundesliga North-relay
- 2007/2008: 4.Place ProA
- 2008/2009: 4. Place ProA (afterwards voluntary retreat to ProB)
- 2009/2010: 1. Place ProB (rise to ProA)
- 2010/2011: 16. Place ProA (descent to ProB)
- 2011/2012: 5. Place ProB-south (0:2 bow out in the Play-Off round of sixteen against SG Braunschweig)
- 2012/2013: 1. Place ProB–south (0:2 bow out in the Play-Off round of sixteen against BSW Sixers)
- 2013/2014: 6. Place ProB-south (1:2 bow out in the Play-Off round of sixteen against Schwelmer Baskets)
- 2014/2015: 3. Place ProB–south (1:2 bow out in the Play-Off round of sixteen against Uni-Riesen Leipzig, rise to ProA by licence absence from Uni-Riesen Leipzig)
- 2015/2016: 16. Place ProA (descent to ProB)
- 2016/2017: 10.Place ProB-south

== Team records ==
Season	Points	Rebounds	Assists	Steals	Blocks
1996/1997	Richard Morton 561(23,4 pro Spiel)	Christian Mehrens 152 (6,3)	Christian Mehrens 152 (6,3)	Richard Morton 52 (2,2)	Christian Mehrens 40 (1,7)
1997/1998	Richard Morton 512 (19,7 pro Spiel)	Stephan Johnson 177 (7,4)	Steven Key 106 (5,1)	Steven Key 49 (2,3)	Stephan Johnson 23 (0,9)
1998/1999	Matthew Alosa 535 (16,4 pro Spiel)	Detlef Musch 179 (5,8)	Duane Washington 105 (5,3)	Duane Washington 51 (2,6)	Detlef Musch 21 (0,7)
1999/2000	Duane Washington 578 (20,6 pro Spiel)	Sascha Rudolphi 158 (5,5)	Duane Washington 103 (3,7)	Duane Washington 59 (2,1)	Sascha Rudolphi 17 (0,6)
2000/2001	Duane Washington 699 (25,0 pro Spiel)	Jürgen Massmann 124 (4,7)	Duane Washington 98 (5,5)	Duane Washington 66 (2,4)	Thomas Lieschke 15 (0,5)
2001/2002	Duane Washington 609 (22,6 pro Spiel)	Yassin Idbihi 139 (7,0)	Duane Washington 113 (4,2)	Duane Washington 62 (2,3)	Yassin Idbihi 20 (1,0)
2002/2003	Alexander Seggelke 618 (21,3 pro Spiel)	Michael Skender 159 (6,4)	Rodney Scruggs 57 (2,1)	Alexander Seggelke 38 (1,3)	Yassin Idbihi 21 (1,0)
2003/2004	Christopher Rojk 650 (21,7 pro Spiel)	Jürgen Malbeck 221 (7,6)	Michael Koch 125 (4,5)	Michael Koch 54 (1,9)	Jürgen Malbeck 39 (1,3)
2004/2005	Christopher Rojik 573 (19,1 pro Spiel)	Christopher Rojik 227 (7,9)	Gordon Scott 113 (4,3)	Gordon Scott 69 (2,7)	Jürgen Malbeck 30 (1,0)
2005/2006	Christopher Rojik 516 (17,2 pro Spiel)	Christopher Rojik 236 (7,9)	Nicholas Moore 105 (3,9)	Nicholas Moore 33 (1,2)	Jürgen Malbeck 19 (0,7)
2006/2007	William Hatcher 565 (18,5 pro Spiel)	Jürgen Malbeck 198 (6,8)	William Hatcher 149 (5,0)	William Hatcher 45 (1,5)	Jürgen Malbeck 28 (1,0)
2007/2008	Christopher Rojik 463 (15,4 pro Spiel)	Matt Dlouhy 207 (6,9)	Kelvin Parker 123 (4,1)	Kelvin Parker 79 (2,6)	Jürgen Malbeck 18 (0,6)
2008/2009	Christopher Rojik 497 (19,1 pro Spiel)	Christopher Rojik 237 (9,1)	Gabriel Moore 125 (4,3)	Gabriel Moore 62 (2,1)	Jürgen Malbeck 22 (0,8)
2009/2010	DeUndraeSpraggins 599 (20,7 pro Spiel )	Christopher Rojik 196 (6,5)	DeUndraeSpraggins 112 (3,9)	DeUndraeSpraggins 57 (2,0)	Jonas Wohlfarth-Bottermann 37 (1,4)
2010/2011	Sanijay Watts 532 (17,7 pro Spiel )	Sanijay Watts 262 (8,7)	Nick Larsen 119 (4,6)	Nick Larson 34 (1,3)	Jonas Wohlfarth-Bottermann 61 (2,1)
2011/2012	Stuart Turnbull 410 (17,1 pro Spiel)	Tim Kasper 159(6,6)	Nick Larsen 119 (5,0)	Stuart Turnbull 55 (2,3)	Tim Kasper 17 (0,7)
2012/2013	Geddes Robinson 389 (17,3 pro Spiel)	Geddes Robinson 269 (11,7)	Nick Larsen 127 (5,5)	Nick Larsen 37 (1,6)	Alejo Rodriguez 26 (1,4)
2013/2014	Tim Schönborn 356 (14,6 pro Spiel)	Cory Remekun 203 (8,1)	Nick Larsen 118 (4,7)	Fabian Thülig 40 (1,6)	Cory Remekun 65 (2,6)
2014/2015	Justin Smith 234 (21,3 pro Spiel)	Theron Laudermill 168 (6,7)	Viktor Frankl-Maus 73 (4,1)	Fabian Thülig 45 (1,8)	Theron Laudermill 39 (1,6)
2015/2016	Stering Carter 389 (15,6 pro Spiel)	Florian Wendeler 138 (4,9)	Viktor Frankl-Maus 135 (5,0)	Viktor Frankl-Maus 48 (1,8)	Floria Wendeler 26 (0,9)
2016/2017	Aaron Nelson 459 (23,0 pro Spiel)	Aaron Nelson 250 (12,5 )	Viktor Frankl-Maus 176 (6,8)	Viktor Frankl-Maus 43 (1,7)	Aaron Nelson 26 (1,3)

== Other teams ==
- 2. men team: 2.Regionalleague West
- 1. Ladys team: 1. Regionalleague West
- U 19 male NBBL as cooperation SG Bonn / Rhöndorf
- U 19 female NRW-league
- U 16 male JBBL as cooperation SG Bonn / Rhöndorf
- U 17 female WNBL
- U 15 female Regionalleague
- U 14 male Regionalleague

== Home arenas ==
The Coliseum Menzenberg in Bad Honnef is the gymnasium where all home matches take place. The gymnasium includes capacity for 1500 places. Over the season 2006/2007 was it only possible to play in the neighbour coliseum „Sporthalle am Sonnnenhuegel“ in Oberpleis, because of an arson was the home coliseum unplayable. On time to the new season 2007/2008 was it luckily possible to practice and play again in the new renovated coliseum. Another renovation took place in the summerbreak 2015 and now you can see new scoreboards, a LED Videowall and a new floor.

Other playplaces from the rest of the Dragons are:

- New coliseum from Siebengebirgsgymnasium
- New coliseum from Schloss Hagerhof
- Old coliseum from Schloss Hagerhof
- Coliseum Muehlenweg in Rhöndorf
