= Marco Völler =

German basketball player (born 1989)

No. 33 – Skyliners Frankfurt
- Position: Forward
- League: ProA

Personal information
- Born: 6 January 1989 (age 37) Offenbach am Main, Germany
- Listed height: 6 ft 6 in (1.98 m)
- Listed weight: 242 lb (110 kg)

Career information
- Playing career: 2012–present

Career history
- 2012–2014: White Wings Hanau
- 2014–2016: Rockets Gotha
- 2016–2017: Gießen 46ers
- 2018–2021, 2023–present: Skyliners Frankfurt

Marco Völler (born 6 January 1989) is a German professional basketball player for Skyliners Frankfurt of the German ProA.

== Professional career ==
As an active player, he last played for the Skyliners in the German League Basketball Bundesliga.

Voller averaged 4.5 points and 3.3 rebounds per game for the Skyliners in the 2019-20 season. He re-signed with the team on 13 August 2020.

== Personal life ==
Völler played soccer until age 14 when he discovered his love for basketball.

He is the son of former German soccer star and national team coach Rudi Völler.
