= Leland Walker =

American basketball player

U-BT Cluj-Napoca
- Position: Point guard
- League: Liga Națională; ABA League; EuroCup

Personal information
- Born: April 12, 2003 (age 23)
- Listed height: 6 ft 1 in (1.85 m)
- Listed weight: 185 lb (84 kg)

Career information
- High school: North Central (Indianapolis, Indiana); Hargrave Military Academy (Chatham, Virginia)
- College: Eastern Kentucky (2022–2024); Florida Atlantic (2024–2025); Wyoming (2025–2026)
- NBA draft: 2026: undrafted
- Playing career: 2026–present

Career history
- 2026: Salon Vilpas
- 2026–present: PAOK Thessaloniki
- 2026–present: → U-BT Cluj-Napoca (loan)

Career highlights
- First-team All-ASUN (2024); Second-team NABC All-District (2024); Honorable mention All-Mountain West (2026)

Leland James Walker (born April 12, 2003) is an American professional basketball player for U-BT Cluj-Napoca of the Romanian Liga Națională, the ABA League, and the EuroCup, on loan from PAOK Thessaloniki. A 6-foot-1-inch (1.85 m) point guard, he played college basketball for Eastern Kentucky, Florida Atlantic and Wyoming.

Walker began his professional career with Salon Vilpas in 2026 and gained wider attention after scoring a Basketball Champions League qualification-record 42 points in the final against CSM Oradea. In October 2026, he signed with PAOK through 2029 and was loaned to U-BT Cluj-Napoca for the remainder of the 2026–27 season.

== Early life and high school career ==
Walker is from Indianapolis, Indiana. He attended North Central High School, where he averaged more than 19 points per game as a junior.

Walker spent the 2021–22 season at Hargrave Military Academy in Virginia. He averaged 16 points, seven assists, five rebounds and one steal per game while helping Hargrave compile a 37–5 record. He was ranked among the top point guards in his recruiting class and became the first four-star freshman recruit to sign with Eastern Kentucky.

== College career ==
=== Eastern Kentucky ===
Walker began his college career at Eastern Kentucky University in 2022. As a freshman in 2022–23, he appeared in all 37 games and averaged 9.4 points, 2.3 rebounds, 2.7 assists and 0.8 steals per game. He was named ASUN Newcomer of the Week in December 2022 after averaging 17 points over two games.

His role expanded significantly during his sophomore season. On November 10, 2023, Walker recorded 16 assists in a 133–75 victory over Wilberforce, setting an Eastern Kentucky single-game program record.

Walker averaged 15.4 points, 2.7 rebounds, 4.1 assists and 1.1 steals per game during the 2023–24 season. He ranked among the conference leaders in scoring, assists, free-throw percentage and assist-to-turnover ratio and was selected to the First Team All-ASUN. He was also named to the NABC Division I All-District 3 Second Team.

Walker scored a then-career-high 29 points against North Florida on January 27, 2024. Eastern Kentucky finished first in the ASUN regular-season standings during his sophomore season.

=== Florida Atlantic ===
Walker transferred to Florida Atlantic University for the 2024–25 season. He started all 33 games in which he appeared and averaged 9.2 points, 2.7 rebounds, 4.5 assists and 1.1 steals per game.

Walker recorded a season-high 20 points against UCF and registered 12 assists against FIU. During the season, he surpassed 1,000 career college points and finished with 149 assists, ranking among the national leaders in that category.

=== Wyoming ===
Walker transferred to the University of Wyoming for his senior season in 2025–26. He entered the season with 1,125 career points, 375 assists and 99 steals over 101 college games.

On December 1, 2025, Walker was named Mountain West Player of the Week after averaging 22 points, four rebounds and three assists in games against Denver and Texas Tech.

He became Wyoming's leading scorer and one of its leading playmakers during the season. Walker scored a career-high 30 points against Boise State and was named honorable mention All-Mountain West at the end of the regular season. By March 2026, he had surpassed 1,500 career points and 450 assists.

Walker completed his four-year NCAA Division I career having appeared in 134 games across Eastern Kentucky, Florida Atlantic and Wyoming.

== Professional career ==
=== Salon Vilpas ===
Walker began his professional career in Finland after signing with reigning Korisliiga champion Salon Vilpas for the 2026–27 season. He joined the club as its third foreign signing of the offseason.

Before the start of the domestic league season, Walker led Vilpas through the qualification rounds of the 2026–27 Basketball Champions League. He scored 29 points against Patrioti Levice in the quarterfinal, 33 against Bakken Bears in the semifinal and 42 against CSM Oradea in the qualification final.

In the final on September 20, 2026, Walker recorded 42 points, six rebounds and three assists in a 98–96 victory over Oradea. He made two free throws in the final second to secure the victory and Vilpas' place in the regular season. His 42 points established a new single-game scoring record for the qualification rounds of the Basketball Champions League.

Walker averaged 34.7 points, 3.3 rebounds and 3.0 assists during the three-game qualification tournament while shooting 50 percent from the field and 54.5 percent from three-point range.

He continued as one of Vilpas' leading scorers at the beginning of the Korisliiga season. Walker scored 30 points in a Finnish Cup victory over Tampereen Pyrintö and recorded multiple 25-point performances during the opening weeks of league play.

In his Basketball Champions League regular-season debut against AEK on October 7, Walker recorded 28 points, seven assists, two rebounds and two steals.

=== PAOK Thessaloniki and loan to U-BT Cluj-Napoca ===
On October 28, 2026, Walker signed with PAOK Thessaloniki on a contract through 2029.

He was subsequently loaned to U-BT Cluj-Napoca for the remainder of the 2026–27 season. With Cluj-Napoca, Walker was set to compete in the Romanian Liga Națională, the ABA League and the EuroCup.

The move followed Walker's strong start to his first professional season in Finland, highlighted by his record-setting 42-point performance during the Basketball Champions League qualification tournament.

== Career statistics ==
=== College ===
Year	Team	GP	PPG	RPG	APG	SPG
2022–23	Eastern Kentucky	37	9.4	2.3	2.7	0.8
2023–24	Eastern Kentucky	31	15.4	2.7	4.1	1.1
2024–25	Florida Atlantic	33	9.2	2.7	4.5	1.1
2025–26	Wyoming	33	13.5	3.0	3.8	0.8

Statistics from official university records and career summaries.
