= Jalyn McCreary =

American basketball player

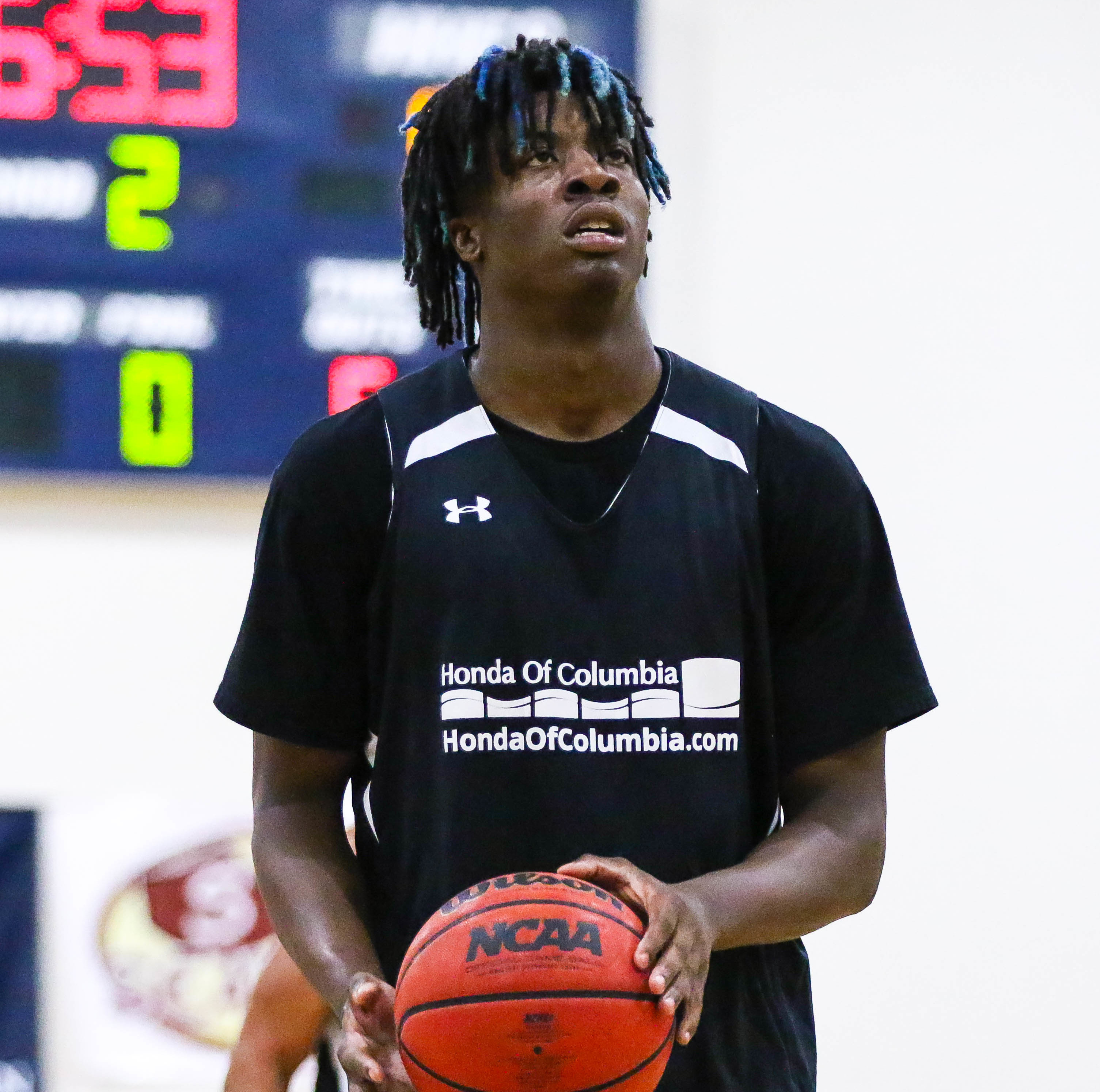

No. 8 – U-BT Cluj-Napoca
- Position: small forward / power forward
- League: Liga Națională; ABA League; EuroCup

Personal information
- Born: September 19, 2000 (age 26) Kennesaw, Georgia, U.S.
- Listed height: 6 ft 7 in (2.01 m)
- Listed weight: 225 lb (102 kg)

Career information
- High school: Legacy Early College (Greenville, South Carolina)
- College: South Carolina (2019–2021); South Florida (2021–2022); Mercer (2022–2024)
- NBA draft: 2024: undrafted
- Playing career: 2024–present

Career history
- 2024–2025: Utilitas Rapla
- 2025–2026: Široki
- 2026–present: U-BT Cluj-Napoca

Career highlights
- ABA League 2 champion (2026); Second-team All-Southern Conference (2024); Third-team All-Southern Conference (2023); Southern Conference Player of the Week (January 30, 2023)

Jalyn Zacchae'us McCreary (born September 19, 2000) is an American professional basketball player for U-BT Cluj-Napoca. A 6-foot-7 forward, he played college basketball for the South Carolina Gamecocks, South Florida Bulls, and Mercer Bears before beginning his professional career in Europe. He has primarily played power forward, while also being used at small forward and center. McCreary earned All-Southern Conference honors in both of his seasons at Mercer. After beginning his professional career with Rapla in Estonia, he joined Široki in Bosnia and Herzegovina and helped the club win the 2025–26 ABA League 2 championship. He signed with U-BT Cluj-Napoca in 2026.

== Early life and high school ==
McCreary was born on September 19, 2000, in Kennesaw, Georgia, and is from the Atlanta-area city of Marietta. He attended Legacy Early College in Greenville, South Carolina, where he played basketball under head coach B. J. Jackson. As a senior, McCreary averaged 18 points and six rebounds per game and helped Legacy Early College compile a 34–5 record. He was named to the USA Today South Carolina All-State second team. McCreary scored 18 points as Legacy Early College won the USA National Prep Championship.

== College career ==
=== South Carolina (2019-2021) ===
McCreary began his college basketball career with the South Carolina of the Southeastern Conference in 2019. As a freshman during the 2019–20 season, he appeared in 27 games and averaged 4.1 points, 2.7 rebounds and 0.4 blocks in 11.5 minutes per game. In SEC play, he averaged 4.8 points and 2.9 rebounds. He scored a season-high 11 points in a victory over Vanderbilt and was named to the SEC First-Year Academic Honor Roll. During his second season with South Carolina, McCreary averaged approximately 13 minutes per game while shooting 48.7 percent from the field. He finished the season by scoring in double figures against Arkansas, Kentucky and Ole Miss. McCreary made his first career start in the 2021 SEC Tournament against Ole Miss, recording 15 points and three blocks.

=== South Florida (2021-2022) ===
McCreary played the 2021–22 season for the South Florida Bulls. He appeared in 16 games, making two starts, and averaged 5.1 points and 3.0 rebounds in 14.1 minutes per game. He shot 52.1 percent from the field and recorded 12 blocks, seven assists and four steals during the season. McCreary scored a season-high 14 points against Tulane.

=== Mercer (2022-2024) ===
McCreary joined the Mercer Bears for the 2022–23 season and became one of the team's leading players. In his first season at Mercer, he appeared in all 33 games and made 25 starts. McCreary led the Bears in both scoring and rebounding, averaging 15.2 points and 5.4 rebounds per game while shooting 54.7 percent from the field, the fifth-best percentage in the Southern Conference. He recorded two double-doubles during the season. Against Chattanooga on December 31, 2022, he became Mercer's first player in three years to record at least 15 points and 15 rebounds in a game. McCreary later scored 26 points in consecutive games against East Tennessee State and The Citadel. He was named Southern Conference Player of the Week on January 30, 2023. At the end of the season, McCreary was selected to the All-Southern Conference third team. McCreary returned to Mercer for the 2023–24 season. He again led the Bears in scoring and was among the Southern Conference leaders in field-goal percentage. During the regular season, he averaged 15.8 points and 4.7 rebounds per game while shooting 53.1 percent from the field. He also established collegiate career highs of 30 points, four assists and four steals. For his performance, McCreary was selected to the All-Southern Conference second team, marking his second consecutive All-SoCon selection.

== Professional career ==
=== Rapla (2024–2025) ===
After completing his college career, McCreary began his professional career in Europe, signing with Utilitas Rapla in Estonia for the 2024–25 season. Playing in the Latvian–Estonian Basketball League and the Estonian domestic competition, McCreary established himself as a productive frontcourt player during his first professional season. He impressed in 26 games, averaging 19 points, 7 rebounds, and an efficiency rating of 21.7.

=== Široki (2025–2026) ===
McCreary joined Bosnian club HKK Široki for the 2025–26 season. He became one of Široki's leading players while competing domestically and in the ABA League 2. McCreary averaged 16.6 points and 7.1 rebounds over 14 ABA League 2 games and helped Široki win the competition's championship. In the Bosnian domestic competition, he averaged 19.3 points and 7.9 rebounds per game over 31 appearances while shooting better than 60 percent from the field.

=== U-BT Cluj-Napoca (2026–present) ===
On June 15, 2026, U-BT Cluj-Napoca announced the signing of McCreary for the 2026–27 season. The club described him primarily as a power forward capable of playing at small forward and center because of his athleticism and versatility.
