= Jeremy Jones (basketball) =

American basketball player

Jeremy Jones (born June 11, 1996) is an American professional Basketball player for the Rio Grande Valley Vipers. He played college basketball for Gonzaga and Rice University. Jones joined the Memphis Grizzlies for the 2025 NBA Summer League.
