= Skyliners Frankfurt =

German professional basketball team

SKYLINERS
- League: Basketball Bundesliga; EuroCup
- Founded: 1999; 27 years ago
- History: Skyliners (1999–2000); Opel Skyliners (2000–2005); Deutsche Bank Skyliners (2005–2011); Fraport Skyliners (2011–2024); SKYLINERS (2024–present)
- Arena: Süwag Energie ARENA
- Capacity: 5,000
- Location: Frankfurt, Germany
- Team colors: Blue, sky blue, white
- Main sponsor: Fraport
- CEO: Yannick Binas
- General manager: Marco Völler
- Head coach: Klaus Perwas
- Affiliation: Skyliners Juniors
- Championships: 1 FIBA Europe Cup; 1 German Championship; 1 German Cup
- Website: https://www.frankfurt-skyliners.de/home
Home	Away	Third

Former logo as Deutsche Bank Skyliners from 2005 until 2011

The Skyliners Frankfurt, formerly known as Fraport Skyliners for sponsorship reasons, is a professional basketball club based in Frankfurt, Germany. Its home arena is Ballsporthalle.

The club has played in the Basketball Bundesliga since 1999. Its greatest accomplishments were the German Cup competition title in 2000, the German national championship in 2004 and the FIBA Europe Cup in 2016.

Its most famous player has been Pascal Roller, who was selected as Basketball Bundesliga All-Star seven times and played 122 games for the German national basketball team. Roller played ten seasons for the Frankfurt Skyliners until his retirement in 2011. Besides Roller, numerous other players of the German national team played multiple seasons for the Skyliners. A notable non-German basketball player is Mario Kasun, who played for the Skyliners when he was discovered and eventually drafted by the NBA team Orlando Magic in 2002.

== History ==
=== The foundation ===
In 1999, Gunnar Woebke, then manager and former player of TV Tatami Rhöndorf moved his team from Bad Honnef to its current location. The declared goal was to place the team in a big arena in a large city to become a top team in the Basketball Bundesliga and in Europe in the near future. In Bad Honnef, this did not seem possible. After going through several options – including the idea to send the team to Cologne – Sylvia Schenk, the director of Frankfurt's sports department officially announced Frankfurt as the team's new location. Franz-Ludwig Solzbacher, a businessman from Bad Honnef helped organize the Skyliners' first steps but remained patron of the TV Rhöndorf and bought a second division license from EnBW Ludwigsburg to keep Rhöndorf from being relegated.

=== Later years ===
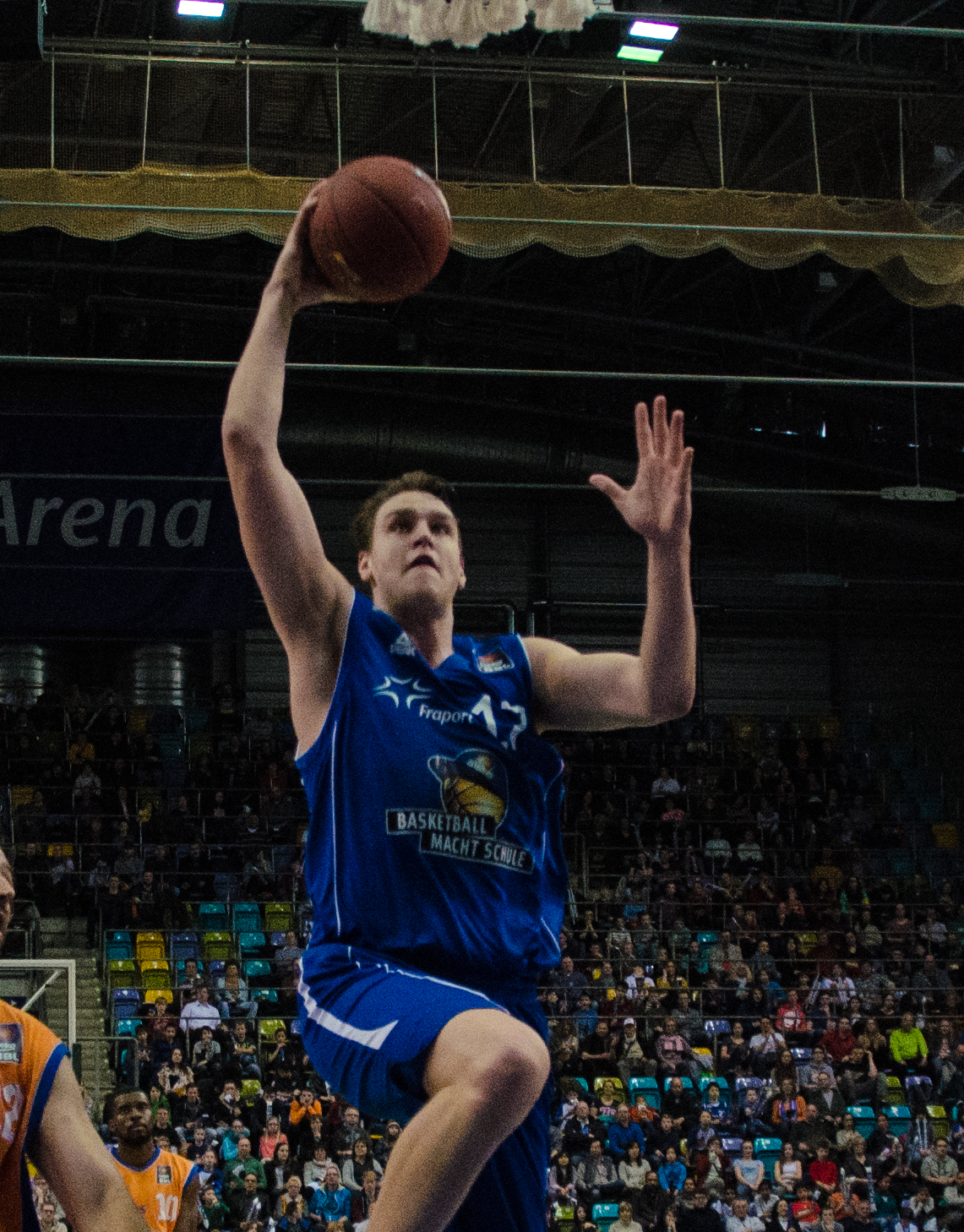
Johannes Voigtmann, playing for the Skyliners in 2015

In its first season as a German elite team it managed to win the German Cup competition. In 2004, they won their first and only Bundesliga title, beating Baskets Bamberg in the finals by 3–2 victories. The following year, the Skyliners had a repeated appearance in the finals, but this time the Baskets Bamberg took the title by 3–2 victories. As in the year before, both teams were almost equally strong.

In 2004 and 2010, the Skyliners finished as runner-up in the German Cup competition, falling against the same opponent with identical victory splits again.

Throughout the years, the Skyliners have been known for their numerous appearances at European competitions such as the Euroleague, Saporta Cup and the Eurocup Basketball.

In 2015, the team reached the EuroChallenge Final Four, but the Germans lost both games to finish in fourth place. In the 2015–16 season, Fraport had once again an impressive European campaign, this time in the newly established FIBA Europe Cup. In the Final, Skyliners beat Pallacanestro Varese 66–62 to win its first European cup in history.

After preventing a relegation to the second tier ProA in the 2021/22 Basketball Bundesliga season by receiving a wildcard, the team again finished 17th in the 2022/23 season and relegated. Denis Wucherer was announced as new head coach for the following 2023/24 season.

== Arena ==
The Skyliners play their home games at the 5,002 seat Fraport Arena (until summer 2011, it was called Ballsporthalle Frankfurt).

== Honours and titles ==
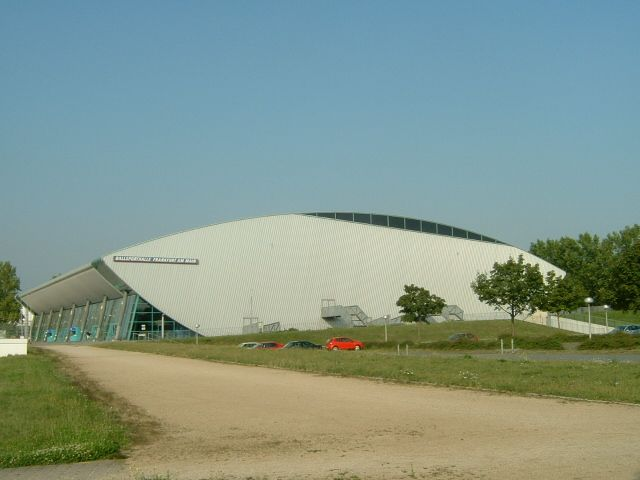
The Fraport Arena, home venue of the club since 1999

Total titles: 3

=== Worldwide ===
- FIBA Intercontinental Cup

Runners-up: 2016

=== European competition ===
- FIBA Europe Cup
  - Champions: 2015–16
- FIBA EuroChallenge
  - Fourth place: 2014–15

=== Domestic competition ===
- Basketball Bundesliga
  - Champions: 2003–04
    - Runners-up: 2004–05, 2009–10
- BBL-Pokal
  - Winners: 2000
    - Runners-up: 2004, 2010

== Players ==
=== Current roster ===
Note: Flags indicate national team eligibility at FIBA-sanctioned events. Players may hold other non-FIBA nationalities not displayed.

Fraport Skyliners roster
Players
Coaches

Pos.	No.	Nat.	Name	Ht.	Age
G	1	(United States)	Swope, Isaiah	1.78 m (5 ft 10 in)	23 – 22 April 2003
G	4	(United States)	Alleyne, Nahiem	1.93 m (6 ft 4 in)	25 – 23 July 2001
F	5	(United States)	Thompson, Race	2.03 m (6 ft 8 in)	27 – 4 June 1999
C	6	(Germany)	Pölking, Moses	2.06 m (6 ft 9 in)	28 – 30 November 1997
G	8	(United States)	Christmas, William	1.96 m (6 ft 5 in)	29 – 8 December 1996
G	10	(United States)	Mintz, Judah	1.90 m (6 ft 3 in)	23 – 10 July 2003
F	13	(Germany)	Crnjac, Ivan	2.00 m (6 ft 7 in)	19 – 10 March 2007
PG	14	(Germany)	Nikolic, Dušan	1.91 m (6 ft 3 in)	21 – 28 February 2005
G/F	15	(Germany)	Caisin, Radii	1.98 m (6 ft 6 in)	25 – 27 February 2001
PF	19	(Germany)	Pape, Till	2.06 m (6 ft 9 in)	28 – 10 December 1997
G	22	(Germany)	Klepeisz, Thomas	1.86 m (6 ft 1 in)	35 – 4 August 1991
C	25	(Germany)	Knauf, Jacob	2.10 m (6 ft 11 in)	29 – 12 March 1997
C	35	(Germany)	Bedime, Roman	2.03 m (6 ft 8 in)	24 – 18 November 2001
G	44	(Czech Republic) (Germany)	Smažák, Lukáš	1.88 m (6 ft 2 in)	19 – 8 September 2007
G	51	(United States)	Arcidiacono, Ryan	1.90 m (6 ft 3 in)	32 – 26 March 1994

Head coach

- (Germany) Klaus Perwas

Assistant coach(es)

- (Germany) Sepehr Tarrah
- (New Zealand) Samara Funnell

Legend

- (C) Team captain
- Injured

- Roster
Updated: October 20, 2026

=== Retired numbers ===
Skyliners Frankfurt retired numbers
No	Nat.	Player	Position	Tenure	Date retired
11	(Germany)	Pascal Roller	PG	1999–2011	October 4, 2011
23	(United States)	Quantez Robertson	SG	2009–2023	March 17, 2024

== Notable players ==
To appear in this section a player must have played at least two seasons for the club AND either:

– Set a club record or won an individual award as a professional player.
– Played at least one official international match for his senior national team at any time.

- (Germany) Danilo Barthel 5 seasons: '11–'16
- (Germany) Isaac Bonga 2 seasons: '16–'18
- (Germany) Robert Garrett 3 seasons: '02–'05
- (Germany) Stefano Garris 3 seasons: '05–'08
- (Germany) Alex King 6 seasons: '03–'08
- (Germany) Konstantin Klein 4 seasons: '12–'16
- (Germany) Leon Kratzer 2 seasons: '18–'20
- (Germany) Robert Maras 5 seasons: '00–'05
- (Germany) Kai Nürnberger 4 seasons: '99–'03
- (Germany) Pascal Roller 10 seasons: '99–'06, '07–'11
- (Germany) Len Schoormann 3 seasons: '19–'22
- (Germany) Akeem Vargas 2 seasons: '18–'20
- (Germany) Johannes Voigtmann 4 seasons: '12–'16
- (Canada) Aaron Doornekamp 2 seasons: '14–'16
- (Canada) Philip Scrubb 2 seasons: '16–'18
- (Croatia) Mario Kasun 2 seasons: '02–'04
- (Finland) Shawn Huff 2 seasons: '17–'19
- (Finland) Mikko Koivisto1 season: '14–'15
- (Finland) Jukka Matinen 4 seasons: '02–'06
- (Finland) Kimmo Muurinen 1 season: '10–'11
- (Georgia (country)) Tyrone Ellis 2 seasons: '03–'05
- (Netherlands) Matt Haarms 2 seasons: '21–'23
- (Senegal) Malick Badiane 3 seasons: '03–'06
- (Sweden) Rudy Mbemba 3 seasons: '05–'08
- (United States) Kavossy Franklin 2 seasons: '04–'06
- (United States) Tyron McCoy 2 seasons: '00–'02
- (United States) Antonio Meeking 2 seasons: '05–'06, '07–'08
- (United States) Quantez Robertson 14 seasons: '09–23
- (United States) Chris Williams 2 seasons: '03–'05

== Head coach position ==
- (Germany) Stefan Koch – 1999–2001
- (Canada) Gordon Herbert – 2001–2004
- (Turkey) Murat Didin – 2004–2005
- (Croatia) Ivan Sunara – 2005–2006
- (Czechoslovakia) Kamil Novak – 2006
- (Sweden) Charles Barton – 2006–2007
- (Greece) Mike Kalavros – 2007
- (Turkey) Murat Didin – 2007–2010
- (Canada) Gordon Herbert – 2010–2011
- (Israel) Muli Katzurin − 2011–2013
- (Canada) Gordon Herbert – 2013–2019
- (Germany) Sebastian Gleim – 2019–2021
- (Spain) Diego Ocampo – 2021–2022
- (Italy) Luca Dalmonte – 2022
- (Netherlands) Geert Hammink – 2022–2023
- (Germany) Klaus Perwas – 2023
- (Germany) Denis Wucherer – 2023–2025
- (Germany) Klaus Perwas – 2025–present

== Season by season ==
Season	Tier	League	Pos.	German Cup	European competitions	
1999–00	1	Bundesliga	3rd	Champion	2 Saporta Cup	R16
2000–01	1	Bundesliga	8th	Fourth position	1 Euroleague	RS
2001–02	1	Bundesliga	3rd	Third position	1 Euroleague	RS
2002–03	1	Bundesliga	7th		2 ULEB Cup	RS
2003–04	1	Bundesliga	1st	Runner-up	2 ULEB Cup	RS
2004–05	1	Bundesliga	2nd	Fourth position	1 Euroleague	RS
2005–06	1	Bundesliga	14th		2 ULEB Cup	RS
2006–07	1	Bundesliga	13th			
2007–08	1	Bundesliga	4th		2 ULEB Cup	RS
2008–09	1	Bundesliga	7th	Third position	3 EuroChallenge	RS
2009–10	1	Bundesliga	2nd	Runner-up		
2010–11	1	Bundesliga	3rd	Fourth position	3 EuroChallenge	RS
2011–12	1	Bundesliga	9th		2 Eurocup	RS
2012–13	1	Bundesliga	15th			
2013–14	1	Bundesliga	11th			
2014–15	1	Bundesliga	6th		3 EuroChallenge	4th
2015–16	1	Bundesliga	3rd	Third position	FIBA Europe Cup	C
2016–17	1	Bundesliga	10th		Champions League	PO
2017–18	1	Bundesliga	8th	Qualifying round		
2018–19	1	Bundesliga	11th	Semifinals	2 EuroCup	T16
2019–20	1	Bundesliga	7th	Round of 16		
2020–21	1	Bundesliga	11th	Group stage		
2021–22	1	Bundesliga	17th	Quarterfinals		
2022–23	1	Bundesliga	17th			
2023–24	2	ProA	2nd	First round		
2024–25	1	Bundesliga	16th	Semifinals		
2025–26	1	Bundesliga	15th	First round		
2026–27	1	Bundesliga			2 EuroCup	

== Junior team ==
The second team of Skyliners plays in the ProB, the German third division. To develop its young players further, the Skyliners have merged some of their youth departments with Eintracht Frankfurt Basketball.

== Kit ==
=== Manufacturer ===
Year	Manufacturer
1999–2000	Mazine
2000–2012	Nike
2012–2021	Peak
2021–2025	Macron

=== Sponsor ===
Year	Sponsor
2000–2005	Opel
2005–2011	Deutsche Bank
2011–2024	Fraport
