= Prima Sport =

Romanian sports TV channel

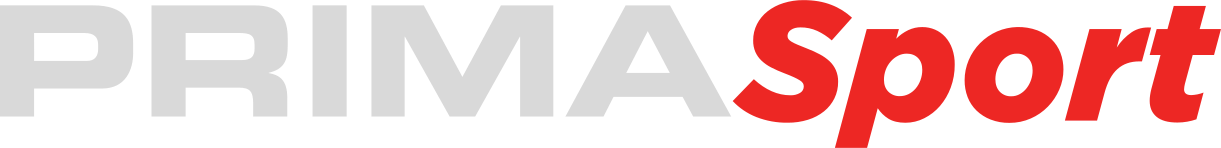
- Country: Romania
- Headquarters: Cluj-Napoca, Bucharest

Ownership
- Owner: Clever Group
- Sister channels: Prima TV; Prima TV Moldova; Prima Sport Moldova; Prima News; Prima Comedy; Prima History; Prima World; Prima 4K; Agro TV; Cinemaraton; Cinemaraton Moldova; Medika TV; Nostalgia TV

History
- Launched: Prima Sport 1 December 19, 2011 (Transilvania L!VE); July 1, 2014 (LookPlus); October 9, 2020 (Look Sport+); April 19, 2022 (Prima Sport 1) Prima Sport 2 February 14, 2012 (Transilvania LOOK); October 5, 2012 (Look TV); August 31, 2018 (Look Sport); April 19, 2022 (Prima Sport 2)
- Closed: Look Sport+ July 1, 2014 (Transilvania L!VE); October 9, 2020 (LookPlus); April 19, 2022 (Look Sport+) Look Sport; October 5, 2012 (Transilvania LOOK); August 31, 2018 (Look TV); April 19, 2022 (Look Sport)
- Former names: Transilvania L!VE; Look Sport

Links
- Website: primasport.ro

Former logo, used from 2018 to 2022.

Prima Sport is a Romanian network of sports channels owned and operated by the media group Clever. The package includes four channels called Prima Sport 1, Prima Sport 2, Prima Sport 3, Prima Sport 4, and Prima Sport 5. It was launched in 2011, under the name Transilvania L!VE and after other names, the channels became Prima Sport on April 19, 2022.

== History ==
Transilvania L!VE was launched on December 19, 2011. It was run by Transilvania Media Group, a media company owned by businessman Arpad Paszkany. On February 14, 2012, a second channel was launched, Transilvania LOOK.

The name was changed in October 2012 to Look TV and Look Plus.

Both channels were sold in March 2014 to Intel Sky Broadcasting LTD, the company that bought the rights for the Liga I and Cupa Ligii and needed their own television channels to distribute the content. On July 1, 2014, the HD version of both channels was launched.

In September 2017 it was sold to Clever Media Network SRL, owned by businessman Adrian Tomşa.

Look Sport 2 and Look Sport 3 were launched on August 16, 2019.

In 2020, LookPlus was changed to a second channel of sports programming under the name Look Sport+.

On April 19, 2022, Look Sport became Prima Sport 1, Look Sport+ became Prima Sport 2, Look Sport 3 changed its name to Prima Sport 3 and Look Sport 2 became Prima Sport 4.

== Shows ==
- Fotbal All Inclusive, hosted by Radu Banciu.
- Fotbal Show, a football talk show, hosted by Vlad Măcicășan, Mădălin Negoiță and Cristian Jacodi as executive producer.
- Prima Motors, with Alexandru Cocu.
- Notele lui Banciu, with Radu Banciu and Vlad Măcicășan (weekly show).
- Nimic despre offside, with Emil Grădinescu and Cristi Costache.

== Sport competitions ==
- (Romania) Liga I
- (Romania) Liga II
- (Romania) Cupa României
- (Romania) Supercupa României
- (Europe) UEFA Champions League
- (Europe) UEFA Europa League
- (Europe) UEFA Conference League
- (Europe) UEFA Super Cup
- (Europe) UEFA Youth League
- (Europe) - UEFA Women's Nations League (only the feminine national team of Romania games were only shown)
- (Spain) La Liga
- (Spain) La Liga 2
- (Germany) Bundesliga
- (Germany) 2. Bundesliga
- (Germany) DFL-Supercup
- (Italy) Serie A
- (Turkey) Süper Lig
- (Belgium) Belgian First Division A
- Coupe de France
- Coupe de France Féminine
- Best of the Best Kickboxing
- MotoGP
- (Europe) EHF Champions League
- (Europe) EHF European League
- (Europe) EHF European Cup
- (Europe) Women's EHF Champions League
- (Europe) Women's EHF European League
- (Europe) Women's EHF European Cup
- (Europe) UEFA Futsal Champions League
- (Europe) Basketball Champions League
- (Romania) Liga Națională (men's basketball)
