= 2018–19 Liga Națională (men's basketball) =

Romanian men's basketball tournament

Liga Națională
- Season: 2018–19
- Duration: 5 October 2018 – 4 June 2019
- Teams: 21

Finals
- Champions: Oradea (3rd title)
- Runners-up: Sibiu
- Third place: U-BT Cluj
- Fourth place: Craiova

The 2018–19 Liga Națională season will be the 69th season of the Liga Națională, the highest professional basketball league in Romania. This will be the first season under a new format, which increases the number of teams to 22. CSM U Oradea are the defending champions.

== Competition format ==
The Romanian Basketball Federation agreed a change in the competition format for the 2018–19 season:

- 22 teams (divided into 3 value groups: A, B and C) played the regular season, consisting in a double-legged round robin format.
  - Group A consist of the top 8 ranked teams from the 2017–18 Liga Națională.
  - Group B consist of top 4 ranked teams from the 2017–18 Liga I.
  - Group C consist of the other teams that played in the 2017–18 Liga Națională, 2017–18 Liga I or newly formed teams (which respect the financial and infrastructure criteria), but which not have the right to advance in this season to the final stages of the championship.
- At the end of the regular season, teams are split into four groups (Red, Yellow, Blue and Green).
  - Red Group consist of the top 6 ranked teams from the Group A.
  - Yellow Group consist of the bottom 2 ranked teams from the Group A, top 3 teams from the Group B and the winner of the Group C.
  - Blue Group consist of the 4th place from the Group B and 2nd to 6th places from the Group C.
  - Green Group consist of the 7th to 10th places from the Group C.
- All teams from the Red Group (from 1st to 6th place) and the top 2 ranked teams from the Yellow Group will join the play-offs. In this knockout stage, quarterfinals and semifinals will be played with a best-of-five-games format.
  - To decide the teams ranked between 5th and 8th place will be used the best-of-three-games format.
  - The rest of the teams from the Yellow, Blue and Green Groups (16 teams) will form 2 groups of 8 teams and will play to decide the final rankings.
- Last six teams of play out phase (17th-22nd place) will be relegated to Liga I

== Team changes ==
Promoted from Liga I

- Cuza Sport Brăila
- Aurel Vlaicu București
- Athletic Constanța
- CSO Voluntari
- CSM BC Sighetu Marmației
- CSM Mediaș
- Rapid București
- ACS Târgu Jiu
- Agronomia București
- Universitatea Cluj-Napoca

=== Excluded teams ===
- BC Mureș was dissolved.

=== Other teams ===
- Miercurea Ciuc, CSM Focșani and CSM Târgu Mureș were enrolled in the Liga Națională.

== Teams ==
=== Group A ===
Location of teams in 2018–19 Liga Națională (Group A)

| Team | City | Arena | Capacity |
|---|---|---|---|
| Craiova | Craiova | Polyvalent Hall | 4,215 |
| Dinamo Stiinta | Bucharest | Dinamo | 2,538 |
| Oradea | Oradea | Arena Antonio Alexe | 2,000 |
| SCM | Timișoara | Constantin Jude | 2,200 |
| Sibiu | Sibiu | Transilvania | 3,000 |
| Steaua | Bucharest | Mihai Viteazu | 2,000 |
| Steaua | Bucharest | Polyvalent Hall | 3,500 |
| U-BT Cluj-Napoca | Cluj-Napoca | Polyvalent Hall | 7,308 |
| U-BT Cluj-Napoca | Cluj-Napoca | Horia Demian | 2,525 |
| U FC Argeș | Pitești | Trivale | 2,000 |

=== Group B ===
Location of teams in 2018–19 Liga Națională (Group B)

| Team | City | Arena | Capacity |
|---|---|---|---|
| Athletic | Constanța | Sala Sporturilor | 1,500 |
| Cuza Sport | Brăila | Danubius | 2,000 |
| CSM | Mediaș | Sala Sporturilor | 461 |
| Voluntari | Voluntari | Gabriela Szabo | 1,100 |

=== Group C ===
Location of teams in 2018–19 Liga Națională (Group C)

| Team | City | Arena | Capacity |
|---|---|---|---|
| Agronomia București | București | Arena de Baschet | 350 |
| Aurel Vlaicu București | București | Sala Unirea | 300 |
| Focșani | Focșani | Vrancea | 1,400 |
| Miercurea Ciuc | Miercurea Ciuc | Eröss Zsolt | 1,700 |
| Phoenix Galați | Galați | Dunărea | 1,500 |
| Rapid București | București | Rapid | 1,500 |
| Sighetu Marmației | Sighetu Marmației | Dragoș Vodă | 200 |
| Târgu Jiu | Târgu Jiu | Sala Sporturilor | 1,500 |
| Târgu Mureș | Târgu Mureș | Sala Sporturilor | 2,000 |
| Universitatea Cluj | Cluj-Napoca | Horia Demian | 2,525 |

== Regular season ==
=== Group A ===
==== League table ====
| Pos | Team | Pld | W | L | PF | PA | PD | Pts | Qualification |
|---|---|---|---|---|---|---|---|---|---|
| 1 | Sibiu | 14 | 11 | 3 | 1237 | 1093 | +144 | 25 | Qualification to Red Group |
| 2 | U-BT Cluj | 14 | 11 | 3 | 1172 | 1100 | +72 | 25 | Qualification to Red Group |
| 3 | Craiova | 14 | 10 | 4 | 1133 | 1118 | +15 | 24 | Qualification to Red Group |
| 4 | Oradea | 14 | 9 | 5 | 1169 | 1099 | +70 | 23 | Qualification to Red Group |
| 5 | U FC Argeș | 14 | 6 | 8 | 1184 | 1206 | −22 | 20 | Qualification to Red Group |
| 6 | Timișoara | 14 | 5 | 9 | 1141 | 1178 | −37 | 19 | Qualification to Red Group |
| 7 | Steaua | 14 | 4 | 10 | 1001 | 1083 | −82 | 18 | Qualification to Yellow Group |
| 8 | Dinamo Știința | 14 | 0 | 14 | 1093 | 1253 | −160 | 14 | Qualification to Yellow Group |

Source: Romanian Basketball Federation

==== Results ====
| Home \ Away | CRA | DIN | ORA | TIM | SIB | STE | UBT | FCA |
|---|---|---|---|---|---|---|---|---|
| Craiova | — | 76–69 | 92–78 | 93–65 | 74–71 | 75–66 | 72–70 | 99–89 |
| Dinamo Stiinta | 89–95 | — | 77–91 | 70–83 | 92–96 | 70–77 | 85–96 | 84–91 |
| Oradea | 85–69 | 85–69 | — | 76–65 | 78–68 | 92–83 | 69–72 | 82–76 |
| SCM Timișoara | 73–74 | 83–70 | 76–99 | — | 87–99 | 78–62 | 86–90 | 99–83 |
| Sibiu | 107–82 | 101–75 | 97–81 | 90–78 | — | 81–66 | 85–74 | 95–69 |
| Steaua | 65–72 | 81–66 | 81–74 | 70–85 | 71–75 | — | 73–81 | 64–75 |
| U-BT Cluj-Napoca | 95–68 | 96–89 | 93–78 | 91–88 | 84–80 | 67–71 | — | 80–76 |
| U FC Argeș | 96–92 | 98–73 | 81–101 | 96–91 | 82–92 | 92–71 | 80–83 | — |

Source: Romanian Basketball Federation
Legend: Blue = home team win; Red = away team win.

=== Group B ===
==== League table ====
| Pos | Team | Pld | W | L | PF | PA | PD | Pts | Qualification |
|---|---|---|---|---|---|---|---|---|---|
| 1 | Voluntari | 12 | 10 | 2 | 1124 | 747 | +377 | 22 | Qualification to Yellow Group |
| 2 | Mediaș | 12 | 8 | 4 | 1141 | 852 | +289 | 20 | Qualification to Yellow Group |
| 3 | Athletic Constanța | 12 | 6 | 6 | 931 | 750 | +181 | 18 | Qualification to Yellow Group |
| 4 | Cuza Sport Brăila | 12 | 0 | 12 | 449 | 1296 | −847 | 12 | Withdrew |

Source: Romanian Basketball Federation

==== Results ====
| Home \ Away | ATH | CSB | MED | VOL | ATH | CSB | MED | VOL |
|---|---|---|---|---|---|---|---|---|
| Athletic Constanța | — | 87–38 | 77–83 | 74–84 | — | 120–33 | 84–83 | 65–67 |
| Cuza Sport Brăila | 24–104 | — | 68–100 | 57–84 | 0–20 | — | 42–113 | 29–126 |
| Mediaș | 90–82 | 156–39 | — | 73–80 | 77–81 | 127–46 | — | 83–79 |
| Voluntari | 95–68 | 133–33 | 84–87 | — | 76–69 | 126–40 | 90–69 | — |

Source: Romanian Basketball Federation
Legend: Blue = home team win; Red = away team win.

=== Group C ===
==== League table ====
| Pos | Team | Pld | W | L | PF | PA | PD | Pts | Qualification |
|---|---|---|---|---|---|---|---|---|---|
| 1 | Phoenix Galați | 18 | 17 | 1 | 1708 | 1237 | +471 | 35 | Qualification to Yellow Group |
| 2 | Târgu Mureș | 18 | 17 | 1 | 1887 | 1233 | +654 | 35 | Qualification to Blue Group |
| 3 | Sighetu Marmației | 18 | 13 | 5 | 1530 | 1396 | +134 | 31 | Qualification to Blue Group |
| 4 | Focșani | 18 | 11 | 7 | 1398 | 1307 | +91 | 29 | Qualification to Blue Group |
| 5 | Târgu Jiu | 18 | 11 | 7 | 1448 | 1413 | +35 | 29 | Qualification to Blue Group |
| 6 | Rapid București | 18 | 8 | 10 | 1243 | 1388 | −145 | 26 | Qualification to Blue Group |
| 7 | Miercurea Ciuc | 18 | 7 | 11 | 1375 | 1465 | −90 | 25 | Qualification to Blue Group |
| 8 | Agronomia București | 18 | 4 | 14 | 1182 | 1420 | −238 | 22 | Qualification to Green Group |
| 9 | Universitatea Cluj-Napoca | 18 | 1 | 17 | 1143 | 1605 | −462 | 19 | Qualification to Green Group |
| 10 | Aurel Vlaicu București | 18 | 1 | 17 | 1025 | 1475 | −450 | 19 | Qualification to Green Group |

Source: Romanian Basketball Federation

==== Results ====
| Home \ Away | AGR | AVB | MIE | FOC | PHX | RAP | SIG | TGJ | TGM | UCJ |
|---|---|---|---|---|---|---|---|---|---|---|
| Agronomia București | — | 67–57 | 73–81 | 60–73 | 48–93 | 74–77 | 57–84 | 66–78 | 49–76 | 84–67 |
| Aurel Vlaicu București | 47–57 | — | 66–83 | 60–79 | 57–77 | 46–61 | 56–83 | 77–90 | 43–110 | 71–60 |
| Miercurea Ciuc | 85–75 | 81–65 | — | 77–62 | 70–89 | 68–77 | 86–93 | 96–98 | 76–105 | 79–68 |
| Focșani | 85–66 | 76–47 | 83–81 | — | 71–90 | 94–69 | 77–82 | 86–83 | 53–91 | 84–50 |
| Phoenix Galați | 93–68 | 99–49 | 110–59 | 86–70 | — | 97–61 | 101–76 | 81–71 | 96–89 | 118–69 |
| Rapid București | 82–64 | 80–60 | 70–68 | 69–78 | 69–94 | — | 39–78 | 87–102 | 45–84 | 97–67 |
| Sighetu Marmației | 99–69 | 87–66 | 89–78 | 79–76 | 89–109 | 85–72 | — | 92–80 | 80–107 | 101–62 |
| Târgu Jiu | 83–65 | 82–62 | 74–51 | 62–80 | 77–82 | 70–67 | 80–76 | — | 60–100 | 78–74 |
| Târgu Mureș | 111–63 | 128–51 | 110–79 | 106–95 | 93–88 | 108–50 | 98–65 | 112–89 | — | 137–90 |
| Universitatea Cluj-Napoca | 49–77 | 75–45 | 58–77 | 49–76 | 51–105 | 51–71 | 83–92 | 59–91 | 61–122 | — |

Source: Romanian Basketball Federation
Legend: Blue = home team win; Red = away team win.

== Second stage ==
=== Red Group ===
==== League table ====
| Pos | Team | Pld | W | L | PF | PA | PD | Pts | Qualification |
|---|---|---|---|---|---|---|---|---|---|
| 1 | Sibiu | 24 | 18 | 6 | 2061 | 1844 | +217 | 42 | Qualification to Play-offs |
| 2 | U-BT Cluj | 24 | 17 | 7 | 2004 | 1888 | +116 | 41 | Qualification to Play-offs |
| 3 | Oradea | 24 | 15 | 9 | 1956 | 1879 | +77 | 39 | Qualification to Play-offs |
| 4 | Craiova | 24 | 12 | 12 | 1867 | 1921 | −54 | 36 | Qualification to Play-offs |
| 5 | Timișoara | 24 | 10 | 14 | 1977 | 2031 | −54 | 34 | Qualification to Play-offs |
| 6 | U FC Argeș | 24 | 10 | 14 | 2020 | 2080 | −60 | 34 | Qualification to Play-offs |

Source: Romanian Basketball Federation

==== Results ====
| Home \ Away | CRA | ORA | SIB | TIM | FCA | UBT |
|---|---|---|---|---|---|---|
| Craiova | — | 78–80 | 59–75 | 88–83 | 80–76 | 69–95 |
| Oradea | 83–79 | — | 69–83 | 85–88 | 81–73 | 75–63 |
| Sibiu | 77–68 | 70–72 | — | 97–71 | 104–86 | 72–78 |
| Timișoara | 74–71 | 83–90 | 86–79 | — | 100–84 | 80–78 |
| U FC Argeș | 83–80 | 90–81 | 74–78 | 86–85 | — | 80–79 |
| U-BT Cluj | 77–62 | 73–71 | 88–89 | 95–86 | 106–104 | — |

Source: Romanian Basketball Federation
Legend: Blue = home team win; Red = away team win.

=== Yellow Group ===
==== League table ====
| Pos | Team | Pld | W | L | PF | PA | PD | Pts | Qualification |
|---|---|---|---|---|---|---|---|---|---|
| 1 | Steaua | 10 | 8 | 2 | 832 | 661 | +171 | 18 | Qualification to Play-offs |
| 2 | Dinamo Știința | 10 | 8 | 2 | 835 | 744 | +91 | 18 | Qualification to Play-offs |
| 3 | Voluntari | 10 | 8 | 2 | 839 | 751 | +88 | 18 | Qualification to Play-out |
| 4 | Phoenix Galați | 10 | 4 | 6 | 746 | 796 | −50 | 14 | Qualification to Play-out |
| 5 | Mediaș | 10 | 1 | 9 | 728 | 865 | −137 | 11 | Qualification to Play-out |
| 6 | Athletic Constanța | 10 | 1 | 9 | 694 | 857 | −163 | 11 | Qualification to Play-out |

Source: Romanian Basketball Federation

==== Results ====
| Home \ Away | ATH | DIN | MED | PHX | STE | VOL |
|---|---|---|---|---|---|---|
| Athletic Constanța | — | 69–85 | 78–74 | 62–79 | 48–82 | 66–91 |
| Dinamo Știința | 85–73 | — | 95–70 | 84–75 | 73–67 | 78–66 |
| Mediaș | 79–73 | 79–91 | — | 74–86 | 55–81 | 84–92 |
| Phoenix Galați | 81–74 | 80–99 | 80–56 | — | 63–87 | 72–97 |
| Steaua | 107–78 | 85–75 | 84–60 | 94–64 | — | 72–77 |
| Voluntari | 94–73 | 80–70 | 105–97 | 69–66 | 68–73 | — |

Updated to match(es) played on update. Source: Romanian Basketball Federation
Legend: Blue = home team win; Red = away team win.

=== Blue Group ===
==== League table ====
| Pos | Team | Pld | W | L | PF | PA | PD | Pts | Qualification |
|---|---|---|---|---|---|---|---|---|---|
| 1 | Târgu Mureș | 28 | 26 | 2 | 2818 | 1949 | +869 | 54 | Qualification to Play-out |
| 2 | Sighetu Marmației | 28 | 18 | 10 | 2400 | 2234 | +166 | 46 | Qualification to Play-out |
| 3 | Focșani | 28 | 17 | 11 | 2155 | 2053 | +102 | 45 | Qualification to Play-out |
| 4 | Târgu Jiu | 28 | 13 | 15 | 2187 | 2319 | −132 | 41 | Qualification to Play-out |
| 5 | Miercurea Ciuc | 28 | 12 | 16 | 2223 | 2329 | −106 | 40 | Qualification to Play-out |
| 6 | Rapid București | 28 | 11 | 17 | 1979 | 2199 | −220 | 39 | Qualification to Play-out |

Source: Romanian Basketball Federation

==== Results ====
| Home \ Away | FOC | MIE | RAP | SIG | TGJ | TGM |
|---|---|---|---|---|---|---|
| Focșani | — | 75–73 | 83–58 | 98–83 | 83–73 | 76–93 |
| Miercurea Ciuc | 89–81 | — | 82–80 | 122–117 | 90–76 | 70–88 |
| Rapid București | 65–74 | 89–86 | — | 81–77 | 85–73 | 65–85 |
| Sighetu Marmației | 82–52 | 96–85 | 77–67 | — | 97–83 | 79–75 |
| Târgu Jiu | 54–79 | 78–87 | 75–74 | 78–77 | — | 65–107 |
| Târgu Mureș | 76–56 | 84–64 | 99–72 | 97–85 | 127–84 | — |

Source: Romanian Basketball Federation
Legend: Blue = home team win; Red = away team win.

=== Green Group ===
==== League table ====
| Pos | Team | Pld | W | L | PF | PA | PD | Pts | Qualification |
|---|---|---|---|---|---|---|---|---|---|
| 1 | Agronomia București | 24 | 10 | 14 | 1639 | 1819 | −180 | 34 | Qualification to Play-out |
| 2 | Universitatea Cluj-Napoca | 24 | 3 | 21 | 1568 | 2038 | −470 | 27 | Qualification to Play-out |
| 3 | Aurel Vlaicu București | 24 | 2 | 22 | 1394 | 1894 | −500 | 26 | Qualification to Play-out |

Source: Romanian Basketball Federation

==== Results ====
| Home \ Away | AGR | AVB | UCJ | AGR | AVB | UCJ |
|---|---|---|---|---|---|---|
| Agronomia București | — | 79–56 | 81–71 | — | — | 84–80 |
| Aurel Vlaicu București | 69–81 | — | 63–70 | 51–57 | — | — |
| Universitatea Cluj-Napoca | 72–75 | 66–69 | — | — | 66–61 | — |

Source: Romanian Basketball Federation
Legend: Blue = home team win; Red = away team win.

== Play-offs ==
All series were played in a best-of-five games format, except the third place match which was played in best-of-three games format.

=== Bracket ===
Quarter-finals
Sibiu | 81 | 91 | 56 | 84
Dinamo Știința | 75 | 82 | 64 | 65
Craiova | 69 | 88 | 90 | 78 | 67
Timișoara | 71 | 72 | 78 | 96 | 62
U-BT Cluj | 72 | 71 | 69
Steaua | 64 | 68 | 66
Oradea | 81 | 74 | 93
U FC Argeș | 77 | 73 | 87

Semi-finals
Sibiu | 83 | 88 | 79 | 74
Craiova | 61 | 59 | 81 | 58
U-BT Cluj | 86 | 92 | 74 | 86
Oradea | 90 | 82 | 82 | 91

Final
Sibiu | 87 | 62 | 71 | 66
Oradea | 89 | 64 | 64 | 75
Third place
U-BT Cluj | 89 | 92
Craiova | 82 | 79

=== 5th to 8th ===
All series were played in a best-of-three games format.

Semi-finals
U FC Argeș | 87 | 70 | 87
Steaua | 64 | 73 | 72
Timișoara | 115 | 91
Dinamo Știința | 87 | 76

Final
Timișoara | 75 | 69 | 72
U FC Argeș | 61 | 95 | 79
Third place
Steaua | 75 | 71
Dinamo Știința | 68 | 58

== 9th to 16th position ==
All series were played by two-legged series.

=== Bracket ===
Quarter-finals
Voluntari | 114 | 106 | 220
Miercurea Ciuc | 82 | 98 | 180
Phoenix Galați | 77 | 95 | 172
Focșani | 72 | 78 | 150
Mediaș | 91 | 74 | 165
Sighetu Marmației | 84 | 61 | 145
Athletic Constanța | 70 | 92 | 162
Târgu Mureș | 78 | 94 | 172

Semi-finals
Voluntari | 1 | 1 | 2
Târgu Mureș | 0 | 0 | 0
Phoenix Galați | 1 | 1 | 2
Mediaș | 0 | 0 | 0

Final
Voluntari | 106 | 68 | 174
Phoenix Galați | 84 | 62 | 146
Third place
Mediaș | 60 | 89 | 149
Târgu Mureș | 85 | 92 | 177

=== 13th to 16th ===
All series were played in a best-of-three games format.

Semi-finals
Sighetu Marmației | 93 | 89
Focșani | 81 | 73
Athletic Constanța | 76 | 91
Miercurea Ciuc | 71 | 88

Final
Athletic Constanța | 66 | 84 | 86
Sighetu Marmației | 75 | 80 | 80
Third place
Focșani | 55 | 64
Miercurea Ciuc | 73 | 109

== 17th to 21st position ==
| Pos | Team | Pld | W | L | PF | PA | PD | Pts |
|---|---|---|---|---|---|---|---|---|
| 17 | Agronomia București | 4 | 3 | 1 | 283 | 266 | +17 | 7 |
| 18 | Rapid București | 4 | 3 | 1 | 285 | 235 | +50 | 7 |
| 19 | Târgu Jiu | 4 | 2 | 2 | 260 | 277 | −17 | 6 |
| 20 | Universitatea Cluj-Napoca | 4 | 1 | 3 | 291 | 309 | −18 | 5 |
| 21 | Aurel Vlaicu București | 4 | 1 | 3 | 228 | 260 | −32 | 5 |

Source: Romanian Basketball Federation

== Final rankings ==
| | Team | Qualification or relegation |
|---|---|---|
| 1 | Oradea | 2019–20 Basketball Champions League |
| 2 | Sibiu | 2019–20 FIBA Europe Cup |
| 3 | U-BT Cluj | 2019–20 FIBA Europe Cup |
| 4 | Craiova | |
| 5 | U FC Argeș | |
| 6 | Timișoara | |
| 7 | Steaua | |
| 8 | Dinamo Știința | |
| 9 | Voluntari | |
| 10 | Phoenix Galați | |
| 11 | Târgu Mureș | |
| 12 | Mediaș | |
| 13 | Athletic Constanța | |
| 14 | Sighetu Marmației | |
| 15 | Miercurea Ciuc | |
| 16 | Focșani | |
| 17 | Agronomia București | Relegation to Liga I |
| 18 | Rapid București | Relegation to Liga I |
| 19 | Târgu Jiu | Relegation to Liga I |
| 20 | Universitatea Cluj-Napoca | Relegation to Liga I |
| 21 | Aurel Vlaicu București | Relegation to Liga I |
| 22 | Cuza Sport Brăila | Withdrew |

== Romanian clubs in European competitions ==
| Team | Competition | Progress |
|---|---|---|
| Oradea | Champions League | First qualifying round |
| Oradea | FIBA Europe Cup | Regular season |
| Steaua | FIBA Europe Cup | Regular season |
| U-BT Cluj-Napoca | FIBA Europe Cup | Second qualifying round |
