= 2019–20 Liga Națională (men's basketball) =

Romanian men's basketball tournament

- Season: 2019–20
- Duration: October 2019 – June 2020
- Teams: 16

The 2019–20 Liga Națională season is the 70th season of the Liga Națională, the highest professional basketball league in Romania. This was the season with a new format, with 16 teams divided into two groups based on results from the previous season. CSM U Oradea were the defending champions.

On 13 March 2020, the league was suspended until 31 March because of the COVID-19 pandemic.

== Teams ==
After withdrawing of Târgu Mureș, ACS Târgu Jiu replaced them in the competition.

=== Group A ===
Location of teams in 2019–20 Liga Națională (Group A)

Team	City	Arena	Capacity
SCM Craiova	Craiova	Polyvalent Hall	4,215
Dinamo Stiinta București	Bucharest	Dinamo	2,538
CSM Oradea	Oradea	Arena Antonio Alexe	2,000
SCM Timișoara	Timișoara	Constantin Jude	2,200
CSU Sibiu	Sibiu	Transilvania	3,000
Steaua București	Bucharest	Mihai Viteazu	2,000
Steaua București	Bucharest	Polyvalent Hall	3,500
U-BT Cluj-Napoca	Cluj-Napoca	Polyvalent Hall	7,308
U-BT Cluj-Napoca	Cluj-Napoca	Horia Demian	2,525
BCMU FC Argeș	Pitești	Trivale	2,000

=== Group B ===
Location of teams in 2019–20 Liga Națională (Group B)

Team	City	Arena	Capacity
Athletic	Constanța	Sala Sporturilor	1,500
CSM Focșani	Focșani	Vrancea	1,400
CSM Miercurea Ciuc	Miercurea Ciuc	Eröss Zsolt	1,700
CSM Galați	Galați	Dunărea	1,500
CSM Sighet	Sighetu Marmației	Dragoș Vodă	200
ACS Târgu Jiu	Târgu Jiu	Sala Sporturilor	1500
CSM Mediaș	Mediaș	Sala Sporturilor	461
CSO Voluntari	Voluntari	Gabriela Szabo	1,100

== Regular season ==
=== Group A ===
Pos	Team	Pld	W	L	PF	PA	PD	Pts	Qualification	ORA	UBT	SIB	STE	DIN	TIM	CRA	FCA
1	CSM Oradea	14	12	2	1195	993	+202	26	Qualification to Red Group	—	82–74	85–73	94–71	94–74	90–52	70–61	100–64
2	U-BT Cluj-Napoca	14	12	2	1234	1107	+127	26	Qualification to Red Group	89–82	—	92–64	99–74	101–90	79–70	88–94	89–80
3	CSU Sibiu	14	9	5	1085	1097	−12	23	Qualification to Red Group	63–85	71–77	—	84–80	89–88	100–96	72–60	78–73
4	Steaua București	14	6	8	1134	1195	−61	20	Qualification to Red Group	85–83	64–88	72–74	—	101–97	81–83	93–90	94–81
5	Dinamo Știința București	14	5	9	1150	1175	−25	19	Qualification to Red Group	62–78	90–100	75–82	70–73	—	84–76	80–73	86–72
6	SCM Timișoara	14	5	9	1118	1186	−68	19	Qualification to Red Group	86–94	89–92	80–84	84–79	64–81	—	84–73	71–84
7	SCMU Craiova	14	5	9	1082	1133	−51	19	Qualification to Yellow Group	68–75	74–81	75–74	83–77	92–88	69–84	—	80–76
8	BCMU FC Argeș Pitești	14	2	12	1095	1207	−112	16	Qualification to Yellow Group	71–83	83–85	59–77	85–90	80–85	96–99	91–90	—

Source: Romanian Basketball Federation

=== Group B ===
Pos	Team	Pld	W	L	PF	PA	PD	Pts	Qualification	VOL	MED	PHX	FOC	ATH	TGJ	MIE	SIG
1	CSO Voluntari	14	13	1	1268	1015	+253	27	Qualification to Yellow Group	—	85–72	94–85	88–72	81–57	95–90	102–65	110–47
2	CSM Mediaș	14	11	3	1217	1075	+142	25	Qualification to Yellow Group	83–85	—	86–77	96–81	93–80	99–79	100–80	98–73
3	CSM Galați	14	11	3	1237	1050	+187	25	Qualification to Yellow Group	83–78	72–85	—	99–94	76–64	92–70	95–77	106–79
4	CSM Focșani	14	6	8	973	998	−25	20	Qualification to Yellow Group	68–88	70–49	59–84	—	61–51	76–59	99–85	0–20
5	Athletic Constanța	14	5	9	962	1019	−57	19	Qualification to Blue Group	78–85	64–88	74–75	65–61	—	68–67	68–58	85–66
6	ACS Târgu Jiu	14	4	10	1053	1155	−102	18	Qualification to Blue Group	64–85	80–98	73–101	89–77	57–66	—	87–73	93–77
7	CSM Miercurea Ciuc	14	3	11	998	1163	−165	17	Qualification to Blue Group	70–90	82–87	52–86	59–80	65–58	84–68	—	83–65
8	CSM Sighet	14	3	11	954	1187	−233	17	Qualification to Blue Group	81–102	67–83	65–106	66–75	86–84	84–77	78–85	—

Source: Romanian Basketball Federation

== Second stage ==
=== Red Group ===
==== League table ====
Pos	Team	Pld	W	L	PF	PA	PD	Pts	Qualification
1	U-BT Cluj	18	15	3	1593	1444	+149	33	Qualification for Champions League qualifying round
2	CSM Oradea	18	15	3	1514	1272	+242	33	Qualification for FIBA Europe Cup
3	CSU Sibiu	19	12	7	1487	1477	+10	31	Qualification for FIBA Europe Cup
4	Dinamo Știința București	19	8	11	1554	1573	−19	27	
5	Steaua București	17	7	10	1454	1551	−97	24	
6	SCM Timișoara	18	5	13	1409	1531	−122	23	

Source: Romanian Basketball Federation

==== Results ====
Home \ Away	ORA	UBT	SIB	STE	DIN	TIM
CSM Oradea	—		75–60		73–69	
U-BT Cluj	89–88	—	90–98	96–69		
CSU Sibiu			—	95–75		
Steaua București				—	76–83	100–82
Dinamo Știința București		82–84	79–78		—	
SCM Timișoara	61–83		61–71		87–91	—

Source: Romanian Basketball Federation
Legend: Blue = home team win; Red = away team win.

=== Yellow Group ===
==== League table ====
Pos	Team	Pld	W	L	PF	PA	PD	Pts
1	BCMU Argeș Pitești	5	5	0	448	390	+58	10
2	SCMU Craiova	5	4	1	445	373	+72	9
3	CSO Voluntari	5	3	2	417	383	+34	8
4	CSM Galați	5	2	3	395	404	−9	7
5	CSM Mediaș	5	1	4	412	459	−47	6
6	CSM Focșani	5	0	5	349	457	−108	5

Source: Romanian Basketball Federation

==== Results ====
Home \ Away	CRA	FCA	VOL	MED	PHX	FOC
BCMU Craiova	—		95–66		85–67	
BCMU Argeș Pitești	76–72	—	97–89	93–88		
CSO Voluntari			—	113–76	82–77	
CSM Mediaș	88–92			—	67–74	93–87
CSM Galați		71–92			—	106–78
CSM Focșani	76–101	70–90	38–67			—

Updated to match(es) played on update. Source: Romanian Basketball Federation
Legend: Blue = home team win; Red = away team win.

=== Blue Group ===
==== League table ====
Pos	Team	Pld	W	L	PF	PA	PD	Pts
1	Athletic Constanța	17	8	9	1226	1250	−24	25
2	ACS Târgu Jiu	17	6	11	1296	1394	−98	23
3	CSM Miercurea Ciuc	17	4	13	1247	1387	−140	21
4	CSM Sighet	17	3	14	1178	1473	−295	20

Source: Romanian Basketball Federation

==== Results ====
Home \ Away	ATH	TGJ	MIE	SIG
Athletic Constanța	—	83–74		101–86
ACS Târgu Jiu		—	85–77	
CSM Miercurea Ciuc	71–80		—	101–59
CSM Sighet		79–84		—

Source: Romanian Basketball Federation
Legend: Blue = home team win; Red = away team win.

== Romanian clubs in European competitions ==
Team	Competition	Progress
Oradea	Champions League	First qualifying round
Oradea	FIBA Europe Cup	Second round
U-BT Cluj-Napoca	FIBA Europe Cup	Quarterfinals
Sibiu	FIBA Europe Cup	Regular season
