= 2022–23 Liga Națională (men's basketball) =

Romanian men's basketball tournament

- Season: 2022–23
- Duration: 28 September 2022 – May 2023
- Teams: 18

The 2022–23 Liga Națională season is the 73rd season of the Liga Națională, the highest professional basketball league in Romania. This will be the season with 18 teams divided into two conferences, placed by the previous regular season's standing.

U-BT Cluj-Napoca are the defending champions.

== Teams ==
Location of teams in 2022–23 Liga Națională. Red: Conference 1; Green: Conference 2.
Location of Bucharest / Ilfov County teams.

=== Conference 1 ===
Team	City	Arena	Capacity
U-BT Cluj-Napoca	Cluj-Napoca	BTarena	10,000
U-BT Cluj-Napoca	Cluj-Napoca	Horia Demian	2,525
FC Argeș Pitești	Pitești	Pitești Arena	4,900
FC Argeș Pitești	Pitești	Trivale	2,000
SCM Universitatea Craiova	Craiova	Polyvalent Hall (Craiova)	4,215
CSU Sibiu	Sibiu	Transilvania	1,850
CSM Petrolul Ploiești	Ploiești	Olimpia	3,500
CSM Târgu Jiu	Târgu Jiu	Sports Hall (Târgu Jiu)	1,223
Rapid București	Bucharest	Rapid	1,500
CSM Miercurea Ciuc	Miercurea Ciuc	Eröss Zsolt	1,200
CSM Târgu Mureș	Târgu Mureș	Sports Hall (Târgu Mureș)	2,000

=== Conference 2 ===
Team	City	Arena	Capacity
CSM Oradea	Oradea	Oradea Arena	5,200
CSO Voluntari	Voluntari	Gabriela Szabo	1,100
OHMA Timișoara	Timișoara	Constantin Jude	1,400
Dinamo București	Bucharest	Dinamo	2,538
Steaua București	Bucharest	Polyvalent Hall (Bucharest)	5,300
Steaua București	Bucharest	Mihai Viteazu	500
Athletic Constanța	Constanța	Sports Hall (Constanța)	1,500
Phoenix Galați	Galați	Dunărea	1,500
CSM Focșani	Focșani	Vrancea	1,400
Laguna București	Bucharest	Arena Baschetului	500

== Romanian clubs in European competitions ==
Competition	Team	Progress
EuroCup	U-BT Cluj-Napoca	Regular season
Champions League	CSO Voluntari	Qualifying rounds
FIBA Europe Cup	CSM Oradea	Regular season
FIBA Europe Cup	SCMU Craiova	Qualifying rounds
Alpe Adria Cup	OHMA Timișoara	Regular season
