= 2015–16 Liga Națională (men's basketball) =

Romanian men's basketball tournament

Liga Națională
- Season: 2015–16
- Duration: 3 October 2015–2 June 2016
- Teams: 12

Regular season
- Top seed: Steaua CSM Eximbank
- Relegated: Energia Târgu Jiu; Gaz Metan Mediaș

Finals
- Champions: Oradea; 1st title
- Runners-up: Mureș
- Third place: Steaua CSM Eximbank
- Fourth place: U-Banca Transilvania
- Finals MVP: Martin Zeno (Oradea)

Statistical leaders
Points	Alhaji Mohammed	19.3
Rebounds	Ionut Dragusin	8.0
Assists	Slobodan Dundjerski	7.3

The 2015–16 Liga Națională season was the 66th season of the Liga Națională, the highest professional basketball league in Romania. CSM U Oradea won its first national championship this season.

== Teams ==
Location of teams in 2015–16 Liga Națională

Defending champion Asesoft Ploiești left the league due to its financial trouble to play in the first league. Meanwhile, Universitatea Cluj and Timba Timișoara were relegated to the Liga I as last qualified teams of the previous season. Dinamo București and Phoenix Galați promoted as champions and runners-up from the 2014–15 Liga I season.

Team	City	Arena	Capacity
Atlassib Sibiu	Sibiu	Sala Transilvania	3,000
BCM U Pitești	Pitești	Sala Sporturilor Trivale	2,000
CSM U Oradea	Oradea	Arena Antonio Alexe	2,000
Dinamo București	București	Sala Polivalentă Dinamo	2,538
Energia Târgu Jiu	Târgu Jiu	Sala Sporturilor Târgu Jiu	1,500
Gaz Metan Mediaș	Mediaș	Sala Sporturilor Mediaș	461
Mureș	Târgu Mureș	Sala Sporturilor Târgu Mureș	2,000
Phoenix Galați	Galați	Sala Sporturilor Dunărea	1,500
Steaua CSM Eximbank	București	Sala Mihai Viteazu	2,000
Timișoara	Timișoara	Constantin Jude Hall	2,200
U-Banca Transilvania	Cluj Napoca	Sala Polivalentă	7,308
Universitatea Craiova	Craiova	Sala Sporturilor Craiova	4,215

== Regular season ==
Pos	Team	Pld	W	L	PF	PA	PD	Pts	Qualification or relegation
1	Steaua CSM Eximbank	32	23	9	2575	2427	+148	55	Qualification to Play-offs
2	CSM U Oradea	32	23	9	2613	2397	+216	55	Qualification to Play-offs
3	U-Banca Transilvania	32	20	12	2495	2365	+130	52	Qualification to Play-offs
4	SCM Universitatea Craiova	32	20	12	2584	2512	+72	52	Qualification to Play-offs
5	Mureș	32	16	16	2594	2568	+26	48	Qualification to Play-offs
6	Atlassib Sibiu	32	16	16	2494	2527	−33	48	Qualification to Play-offs
7	Phoenix Galați	32	16	16	2588	2684	−96	48	Qualification to Play-offs
8	Dinamo București	32	15	17	2586	2532	+54	47	Qualification to Play-offs
9	BCM U Pitești (Note: BCMU Pitești was deducted 3 points.)	32	15	17	2570	2390	+180	44	
10	Timișoara	32	12	20	2410	2551	−141	44	
11	Energia Târgu Jiu	32	11	21	2379	2589	−210	43	Relegation to Liga I
12	Gaz Metan Mediaș	32	5	27	2458	2804	−346	37	Relegation to Liga I

Source: Romanian Basketball Federation

== Play-offs ==
Quarterfinals
1	Steaua CSM Eximbank	3
8	Dinamo București	1
4	SCM Universitatea Craiova	0
5	Mureș	3
2	CSM U Oradea	3
7	Phoenix Galați	1
3	U-Banca Transilvania	3
6	Atlassib Sibiu	1

Semifinals
1	Steaua CSM Eximbank	1
5	Mureș	3
2	CSM U Oradea	3
3	U-Banca Transilvania	1

Finals
2	CSM U Oradea	3
5	Mureș	2
Third place
1	Steaua CSM Eximbank	2
3	U-Banca Transilvania	0
