= 2023–24 Liga Națională (men's basketball) =

Romanian men's basketball tournament

- Season: 2023–24
- Duration: 22 September 2023 – 9 May 2024 (Regular season)
- Teams: 18

Regular season
- Promoted: CS Vâlcea 1924; CSM Corona Brașov

Finals
- Champions: U-BT Cluj-Napoca
- Runners-up: CSM Oradea
- Third place: CSO Voluntari
- Fourth place: FC Argeș Pitești

Records
- Biggest home win: CS Valcea 1924 105 - 57 ABC Laguna Bucuresti (27 January 2024)
- Biggest away win: ABC Laguna Bucuresti 49 - 82 CS Dinamo Bucuresti (09 December 2023)
- Highest scoring: CS Phoenix Galați 106 - 118 CS Valcea 1924 (03 February 2024)
- Lowest scoring: CSO Voluntari 75 - 40 ABC Laguna Bucuresti (24 September 2023)
- Winning streak: 19 games U-BT Cluj-Napoca
- Losing streak: 18 games ABC Laguna Bucuresti

The 2023–24 Liga Națională season is the 74th season of the Liga Națională, the highest professional basketball league in Romania. This will be the season with 18 teams divided into two conferences, placed by the previous regular season's standing.

U-BT Cluj-Napoca are the defending champions.

== Teams ==
Location of teams in 2023–24 Liga Națională. Red: Conference A; Green: Conference B.
Location of Bucharest / Ilfov County teams.

=== Conference A ===
Team	City	Arena	Capacity
U-BT Cluj-Napoca	Cluj-Napoca	BTarena	10,000
U-BT Cluj-Napoca	Cluj-Napoca	Horia Demian	2,525
CSO Voluntari	Voluntari	Gabriela Szabo	1,100
CSM Corona Brașov	Brașov	Dumitru Popescu Colibași Sports Hall	1,700
Dinamo București	Bucharest	Dinamo	2,538
CSM Târgu Jiu	Târgu Jiu	Sports Hall (Târgu Jiu)	1,223
Mozzart Bet Timișoara	Timișoara	Constantin Jude	1,400
Rapid București	Bucharest	Rapid	1,500
ABC Laguna București	Bucharest	Arena Baschetului	500
CSM Galați	Galați	Dunărea	1,500

=== Conference B ===
Team	City	Arena	Capacity
CSM CSO Oradea	Oradea	Oradea Arena	5,200
BC CSU Sibiu	Sibiu	Transilvania	1,850
CS Vâlcea 1924	Râmnicu Vâlcea	Traian Sports Hall	3,126
CSM Petrolul Ploiești	Ploiești	Olimpia	3,500
FC Argeș Pitești	Pitești	Pitești Arena	4,900
FC Argeș Pitești	Pitești	Trivale	2,000
CSM Constanța	Constanța	Sports Hall (Constanța)	1,500
CSM Târgu Mureș	Târgu Mureș	Sports Hall (Târgu Mureș)	2,000
CSM Focșani	Focșani	Vrancea	1,400
SCM Universitatea Craiova	Craiova	Polyvalent Hall (Craiova)	4,215

== Romanian clubs in European competitions ==
Competition	Team	Progress
EuroCup	U-BT Cluj-Napoca	Quarterfinals
FIBA Europe Cup	CSM Oradea	Second round
FIBA Europe Cup	CSU Sibiu	Regular season
FIBA Europe Cup	Rapid București	Qualifying rounds
Alpe Adria Cup	Mozzart Bet Timișoara	2nd Place
ENBL	CSO Voluntari	Semifinals
