= 2014–15 Liga Națională (men's basketball) =

Romanian men's basketball tournament

Liga Națională
- Duration: October 1, 2014 – March 28, 2015 (Regular season); April 10, 2015 – May 24, 2015 (Playoffs)
- Games played: 153 (Regular season)
- Teams: 13
- TV partner(s): Digi Sport (Romania); TVR

Regular season
- Top seed: CSU Asesoft Ploiești
- Relegated: Timba Timișoara; Universitatea Cluj

Finals
- Champions: CSU Asesoft Ploiești (11th title)
- Runners-up: Mureș
- Third place: Energia Târgu Jiu
- Fourth place: Steaua CSM EximBank București
- Finals MVP: (Serbia) Vladimir Tica

Statistical leaders
Points	(Serbia) Zoran Krstanović	21.3
Rebounds	(Serbia) Marko Đurković	10.7
Assists	(United States) Dee Brown	9.1

The 2014–15 season was the 65th season of the Liga Națională, the highest professional basketball league in Romania.

The first half of the season consisted of 13 teams and 156-game regular season games (24 games for each of the 13 teams) beginning on 1 October 2014 and ended on 28 March 2015, just before the play-offs.

== Teams for 2014–15 season ==
2014–15 Liga Națională club locations

Team	City	Arena	Capacity
BC Mureș	Târgu Mureș	Sala Sporturilor Târgu Mureș	2,000
Steaua CSM Eximbank	București	Sala Mihai Viteazu	300
Asesoft Ploiești	Ploiești	Olimpia Sports Hall	3,500
Gaz Metan Mediaș	Mediaș	Sala Sporturilor Mediaș	461
U-Banca Transilvania	Cluj Napoca	Sala Polivalentă	7,308
BCMU Pitești	Pitești	Sala Sporturilor Trivale	2,000
BC Timișoara	Timișoara	Constantin Jude Hall	2,200
SCM Universitatea Craiova	Craiova	Sala Sporturilor Craiova	4,215
CSM U Oradea	Oradea	Arena Antonio Alexe	2,000
CSU Atlassib Sibiu	Sibiu	Sala Transilvania	3,000
Timba Timișoara	Timișoara	Constantin Jude Hall	2,200
Energia Rovinari	Târgu Jiu	Sala Sporturilor Târgu Jiu	1,500
Universitatea Cluj	Cluj Napoca	Sala Polivalentă	7,308

=== Personnel and sponsorship ===
Club	Head coach	President	Main sponsor	Kit manufacturer
BC Mureș	(Serbia) Srećko Sekulović	(Romania) Cornel Lungu	Primaria Târgu Mureş	Spalding
Steaua CSM Eximbank	(Croatia) Nikša Bavčević	(Romania) Virgil Stanescu	Exim Bank	Masita
Asesoft Ploiești	(Serbia) Vladimir Arnautović	(Romania) Ionut Georgescu	România TV	Adidas
Gaz Metan Mediaș	(Romania) Marius Nistor	(Romania) Ioan Horoba	Romgaz	Adidas
U-Banca Transilvania	(Romania) Dorin Pintea	(Romania) Valentin Nica	BT	Ancada
BCMU Pitești	(Romania) Hristu Sapera	(Romania) Dinu Ghoerghe	Primaria Pitești	Peak
BC Timișoara	(Bosnia and Herzegovina) Dragan Petricevic	(Romania) Leontin De Maio	Primaria Timișoara	Macron
SCM Universitatea Craiova	(Serbia) Andjelko Mandic	(Romania) Bogdan Balan	Primaria Craiova	Adidas
CSM U Oradea	(Romania) Cristian Achim	(Romania) Florin Birta	Digi	Ancada
CSU Atlassib Sibiu	(Serbia) Miodrag Perisic	(Romania) Mircea Vulc	Atlassib	Spalding
Timba Timișoara	(Romania) Bogdan Murarescu	(Romania) Mircea Murarescu	Gauss	Spalding
Energia Rovinari	(Cyprus) Antonis Konstantinides	(Romania) Dan Cumpănaşu	C.E.O.	Macron
Universitatea Cluj	(Romania) Carmin Popa	(Romania) Ovidiu Vasu	—	—

== Regular season ==
Pos	Team	Pld	W	L	PF	PA	PD	Pts	Qualification or relegation
1	Asesoft Ploiești	24	19	5	1992	1778	+214	43	Qualification to Play-offs
2	Steaua CSM Eximbank	24	18	6	2056	1904	+152	42	Qualification to Play-offs
3	U-Banca Transilvania	24	16	8	2000	1769	+231	40	Qualification to Play-offs
4	Energia Rovinari	24	15	9	1940	1828	+112	39	Qualification to Play-offs
5	BCMU Pitești	24	14	10	1970	1949	+21	38	Qualification to Play-offs
6	BC Mureș	24	13	11	1978	1843	+135	37	Qualification to Play-offs
7	CSM U Oradea	24	13	11	2040	2022	+18	37	Qualification to Play-offs
8	BC Timișoara	24	12	12	1928	1875	+53	36	Qualification to Play-offs
9	Gaz Metan Mediaș	24	11	13	1871	1926	−55	35	
10	CSU Atlassib Sibiu	24	10	14	1855	1860	−5	34	
11	SCM Universitatea Craiova	24	10	14	1865	1933	−68	34	
12	Timba Timișoara	24	5	19	1812	2024	−212	29	Relegation to Liga I
13	Universitatea Cluj	24	0	24	1633	2229	−596	24	Relegation to Liga I

Source: Romanian Basketball Federation

== Play-offs ==
Quarterfinals
1	Asesoft Ploiești	3
8	BC Timișoara	1
4	Energia Târgu Jiu	3
5	BCMU Pitești	0
2	Steaua CSM Eximbank	3
7	CSM U Oradea	0
3	U-Banca Transilvania	0
6	BC Mureș	3

Semifinals
1	Asesoft Ploiești	3
4	Energia Târgu Jiu	1
2	Steaua CSM Eximbank	0
6	BC Mureș	3

Finals
1	Asesoft Ploiești	3
6	BC Mureș	0
Third place
4	Energia Târgu Jiu	2
2	Steaua CSM Eximbank	0

== Awards ==
- Finals MVP

(Serbia) Vladimir Tica – CSU Asesoft Ploiești
