= 2017–18 Liga Națională (men's basketball) =

Romanian men's basketball tournament

Liga Națională
- Season: 2017–18
- Teams: 12

Finals
- Champions: Oradea (2nd title)
- Runners-up: Steaua CSM Eximbank
- Third place: U-BT Cluj
- Fourth place: CSU Sibiu

The 2017–18 Liga Națională season was the 68th season of the Liga Națională, the highest professional basketball league in Romania. U-BT Cluj-Napoca were the defending champion.

== Competition format ==
The competition format will be the same as in the previous season.

- 12 teams played the regular season, consisting in a double-legged round robin format.
- At the end of the regular season, teams are split into two groups, one of them composed by the first six teams and the other one by the rest. In this second stage all points of the regular season are counted and the teams will face each other from its group twice.
- All teams from the group from 1st to 6th and the two first qualified teams from the bottom group will join the playoffs. In this knockout stage, quarterfinals and semifinals will be played with a best-of-three-games format and the final with a best-of-five one.

== Teams ==
Timba Timișoara and Politehnica Iași promoted from the last Liga I. There were not any relegations as there were only 11 teams in the previous season and Olimpic Baia Mare withdrew from the competition.

Location of teams in 2017–18 Liga Națională

Team	City	Arena	Capacity
Mureș	Târgu Mureș	Sala Sporturilor	2,000
Timișoara	Timișoara	Constantin Jude	2,200
Timba	Timișoara	Constantin Jude	2,200
FC Arges	Pitești	Trivale	2,000
Oradea	Oradea	Arena Antonio Alexe	2,000
Sibiu	Sibiu	Transilvania	3,000
Dinamo București	București	Dinamo	2,538
Phoenix Galați	Galați	Dunărea	1,500
Politehnica Iași	Iași	Polyvalent Hall	1,500
Craiova	Craiova	Polyvalent Hall	4,215
Steaua Eximbank	București	Mihai Viteazu	2,000
Steaua Eximbank	București	Polyvalent Hall	3,500
U-BT Cluj-Napoca	Cluj-Napoca	Polyvalent Hall	7,308
U-BT Cluj-Napoca	Cluj-Napoca	Horia Demian	2,525

== Regular season ==
Pos	Team	Pld	W	L	PF	PA	PD	Pts	Qualification
1	Sibiu	22	18	4	1945	1594	+351	40	Qualification to group 1–6
2	U-BT Cluj-Napoca	22	18	4	1905	1643	+262	40	Qualification to group 1–6
3	Timișoara	22	15	7	1958	1712	+246	37	Qualification to group 1–6
4	Oradea	22	15	7	1970	1644	+326	37	Qualification to group 1–6
5	Steaua Eximbank	22	15	7	1907	1645	+262	37	Qualification to group 1–6
6	U FC Arges	22	13	9	1854	1709	+145	35	Qualification to group 1–6
7	Craiova	22	11	11	2027	1926	+101	33	Qualification to group 7–12
8	Phoenix Galați	22	10	12	1792	1765	+27	32	Qualification to group 7–12
9	Timba	22	6	16	1711	1945	−234	28	Qualification to group 7–12
10	Mureș	22	6	16	1531	1954	−423	28	Qualification to group 7–12
11	Politehnica Iași	22	4	18	1674	1903	−229	26	Qualification to group 7–12
12	Dinamo București	22	1	21	1353	2187	−834	23	Qualification to group 7–12

Source: Romanian Basketball Federation

== Second stage ==
=== Group 1–6 ===
Pos	Team	Pld	W	L	PF	PA	PD	Pts	Qualification
1	U-BT Cluj-Napoca	32	23	9	2750	2454	+296	55	Qualification to Play-offs
2	Sibiu	32	23	9	2734	2418	+316	55	Qualification to Play-offs
3	Oradea	32	22	10	2799	2441	+358	54	Qualification to Play-offs
4	Steaua Eximbank	32	21	11	2686	2399	+287	53	Qualification to Play-offs
5	Timișoara	32	20	12	2759	2494	+265	52	Qualification to Play-offs
6	U FC Arges	32	15	17	2615	2545	+70	47	Qualification to Play-offs

Source: Romanian Basketball Federation

=== Group 7–12 ===
Pos	Team	Pld	W	L	PF	PA	PD	Pts	Qualification or relegation
7	Craiova	30	18	12	2861	2511	+350	48	Qualification to Play-offs
8	Phoenix Galați	30	17	13	2557	2335	+222	47	Qualification to Play-offs
9	Timba	30	9	21	2372	2650	−278	39	
10	Politehnica Iași	30	5	25	2299	2749	−450	35	
11	Dinamo București	30	3	27	1954	2967	−1013	33	
12	Mureș (Note: Mureș did not play the second stage.) (D)	22	6	16	1531	1954	−423	28	Withdrew

Source: Romanian Basketball Federation
(D) Disqualified

== Play-offs ==
All series were played in a best-of-five games format.

Quarter-finals
1 U-BT Cluj-Napoca	98	78	71
8 Phoenix Galați	69	64	67
4 Steaua Eximbank	89	69	82	74	76
5 Timișoara	67	74	89	64	69
2 Sibiu	86	82	85
7 Craiova	73	75	84
3 Oradea	62	88	83	74
6 U FC Arges	66	58	70	67

Semi-finals
1 U-BT Cluj-Napoca	89	85	71	78	72
4 Steaua Eximbank	79	75	79	86	76
2 Sibiu	78	85	64	61
3 Oradea	81	78	76	71

Final
4 Steaua CSM Eximbank	73	75	70	89
3 Oradea	86	70	94	92

Third place
1 U-BT Cluj-Napoca	94	90	91
2 CSU Sibiu	89	93	77
