= William Wise III =

American basketball player (born 1991)

Will Wise
No. 6 – Eastern Mavericks
- Position: Small forward
- League: NBL1 Central

Personal information
- Born: October 30, 1991 (age 35) Philadelphia, Pennsylvania, U.S.
- Listed height: 6 ft 9 in (2.06 m)
- Listed weight: 225 lb (102 kg)

Career information
- High school: Abingdon Friends (Jenkintown, Pennsylvania); Hun School (Princeton, New Jersey)
- College: UMBC (2011–2013); Texas A&M International (2013–2015); Dominican College (2015–2016)
- NBA draft: 2016: undrafted
- Playing career: 2016–present

Career history
- 2016–2017: C.B. Nerja
- 2017–2018: CSM BC Sighetu Marmației
- 2018: Eastern Mavericks
- 2019–2020: BC Valga-Valka
- 2021: Eastern Mavericks

William Kenneth Wise III (born October 30, 1991) is an American professional basketball player who plays for Eastern Mavericks of the NBL1 Central in Australia. He finished his collegiate career at Dominican College (New York).

== Early life and college career ==
Wise is a 6'9" forward from Philadelphia. He played high school basketball at Abington Friends School before transferring to The Hun School in Princeton, New Jersey, to finish high school.

He played college basketball at the University of Maryland, Baltimore County starting from 2011. After playing 6 total games in his second year Wise decided to transfer to TAMIU in the fall of 2013. Wise then transferred to Dominican College in New York to finish his collegiate career. He averaged 4.3 points and 2.9 rebounds in his lone season with the Chargers.

== Professional career ==
Wise signed with C.B. Nerja in Spain's 4th division. In his second year, Wise signed with CSM BC Sighetu Marmației in Romania. Initially the club played in the country's second-tier basketball league, Liga I but were promoted to the top-tier Liga Națională.

Wise opted to leave the club midseason and join the Eastern Mavericks of the Premier League in Australia. For the 2018 season Wise led the Eastern Mavericks in total points, total rebounds, minutes played, rebounds per game (7.44) and was second in scoring with 19.83 ppg.

In December 2019 Wise agreed to terms with BC Valga-Valka of the Latvian-Estonian Basketball League.

In April 2021 Wise agreed to terms with Eastern Mavericks of the NBL1 Central in Australia, making his return to the club he played with in 2018.
