= Ameer Jackson =

American basketball player

Free agent

Personal information
- Born: May 11, 1994 (age 32) Paterson, New Jersey, U.S.
- Listed height: 6 ft 4 in (1.93 m)
- Listed weight: 185 lb (84 kg)

Career information
- High school: Northwest Cabarrus High School (Concord, North Carolina); Fork Union Military Academy (Fork Union, Virginia); Evelyn Mack Academy (Charlotte, North Carolina)
- College: Dodge City Community College (2013–2015); Sam Houston State (2015–2016); Winston-Salem State (2016–2017)
- Playing career: 2017–present
- Position: Point guard

Career history
- 2017–2018: CN Aurel Vlaicu București
- 2018–2019: Al-Khor SC
- 2019–2020: Ezzahra Sports
- 2020–2021: Ghaz Al-Shamal
- 2021: Soles de Santo Domingo Este
- 2021–2022: KB Rahoveci
- 2022: Al Hilal Benghazi
- 2022: Byblos Club
- 2023: Al-Khor SC

Ameer Jackson (born May 11, 1994) is an American professional basketball player. After playing collegiate basketball for Sam Houston State University and Winston-Salem State University, Jackson was signed professionally for CN Aurel Vlaicu București (based in Bucharest, Romania) in 2017 to compete in the Liga I, later signing for Al-Khor in 2018 as the youngest imported player at the time for the Qatari Basketball League, where he was the top scorer for the season.

== Early life and college career ==
Jackson was born in Paterson, New Jersey in 1994, and first played varsity basketball for Northwest Cabarrus High School as a junior point guard. Traveling to Virginia, Jackson attended Fork Union Military Academy, where he was the highest scoring player for their 2011–12 season. After returning to North Carolina to attend Evelyn Mack Academy, Jackson was signed to Dodge City Community College in Kansas due to his high point averages at high school.

After performing two seasons for Dodge City, Jackson signed with Sam Houston State University for the 2015–16 season, however he was benched after four games due to a torn ligament. After recovering, Jackson returned to North Carolina, transferring to the Winston-Salem State Rams for the second semester of the 2016–17 season, where he was the second-lead scorer for the season.

== Professional career ==
Jackson decided to bypass his final season on the Rams and play professionally, signing with CN Aurel Vlaicu București in Bucharest to compete in the Liga I league as a point guard. In an opening match against CSU Știința București, Jackson scored 32 points, averaging 37.3 points for the season.

Jackson signed with Al-Khor SC in Qatar the 2018–19 season, as one of three imported players for the team. Jackson was the youngest imported player in the Qatari Basketball League.

Despite Al-Khoor's poor performance in the league, Jackson had an individually great season, being the number one scorer of the league for the 2018–19 season, with an average of 24.3 points.

Jackson joined the Soles de Santo Domingo Este of the Dominican league in 2021 and averaged 7.0 points, 2.4 assists, 1.4 rebounds and 1.2 steals per game. On December 11, 2021, he signed with KB Rahoveci of the Kosovo Basketball Superleague. On March 1, 2022, Jackson signed with Al Hilal Benghazi of the Libyan Division I Basketball League.
