= Lufile =

Lufile is a surname. Notable people with the name include:

- Chadrack Lufile (born 1990), Congolese-Canadian basketball player
- Meshack Lufile (born 1992), Canadian basketball player
