= CSM Constanța (men's basketball) =

- Nickname: Gladiatorii din Tomis (The Gladiators from Tomis)
- Leagues: Liga Națională
- Founded: 2007; 18 years ago
- Arena: Sala Sporturilor
- Capacity: 1,500
- Location: Constanța, Romania
- Team colors: White, Gold, Blue
- Team manager: Ginas Rutkauskas
- Head coach: Dan Fleșeriu
| Home | Away |

Clubul Sportiv Municipal Constanța, commonly known as CSM Constanța, is a Romanian basketball club based in Constanța, which currently participates in the Liga Națională, the top-tier league in Romania. The team represents the men's basketball section of the CSM Constanța multi-sports club. The basketball team predates the multi-sports club (which was founded in 2021), being named Athletic Neptun Constanța before the merger in the summer of 2022. The club initially played in the second-tier Liga I. However, in 2018 the league was merged with the top-tier: Liga Națională.

== Season by season ==
| Season | Tier | Division | Pos. | W–L | Romanian Cup | European competitions |
|---|---|---|---|---|---|---|
| 2018–19 | 1 | Liga Națională | 13th | 7–17 | Eightfinals | |
| 2019–20 | 1 | Liga Națională | Cancelled due to the COVID-19 pandemic | | 16th finals | |
| 2020–21 | 1 | Liga Națională | 14th | 2–24 | Preliminary Stage | |
| 2021–22 | 1 | Liga Națională | 11th | 12–18 | Quarterfinals | |
| 2022–23 | 1 | Liga Națională | 10th | 11–15 | Semifinals | |
| 2023–24 | 1 | Liga Națională | 7th | 15–19 | Semifinals | |
| 2024–25 | 1 | Liga Națională | 16th | 4–26 | Quarterfinals | |

== Current roster ==
Note: Flags indicate national team eligibility at FIBA-sanctioned events. Players may hold other non-FIBA nationalities not displayed.

CSM Constanța roster
Players
Coaches

| Pos. | No. | Nat. | Name | Ht. | Age |
|---|---|---|---|---|---|
| SF | 2 | (Romania) | Gribinic, Ștefan | 1.94 m (6 ft 4 in) | 23 – 9 July 2002 |
| G | 3 | (United States) | Duffy, Jorden | 1.85 m (6 ft 1 in) | 29 – 19 August 1996 |
| F | 5 | (Moldova) | Blan, Vitalie | 2.02 m (6 ft 8 in) | 25 – 9 May 2000 |
| G | 7 | (Romania) | Oprean, Andrei | 1.82 m (6 ft 0 in) | 26 – 6 February 1999 |
| F | 9 | (Romania) | Jeleș, Șerban | 1.95 m (6 ft 5 in) | 19 – 5 April 2006 |
| F | 11 | (United States) | Hill, Kyndahl | 2.01 m (6 ft 7 in) | 31 – 21 August 1994 |
| F | 13 | (United States) | Henderson, Cedric Earl | 1.98 m (6 ft 6 in) | 25 – 3 March 2000 |
| PF | 14 | (Romania) | Török, Rolland | 2.02 m (6 ft 8 in) | 34 – 25 November 1990 |
| PG | 18 | (Romania) | Rădulescu, Adrian | 1.90 m (6 ft 3 in) | 21 – 27 July 2004 |
| SG | 22 | (Lithuania) | Čižauskas, Vytenis | 1.87 m (6 ft 2 in) | 33 – 16 September 1992 |
| C | 25 | (United States) | Griffin, Bryan Michael | 2.03 m (6 ft 8 in) | 27 – 30 April 1998 |
| PF | 37 | (Romania) | Lazăr, Mario | 2.01 m (6 ft 7 in) | 31 – 24 May 1994 |
| SG | 55 | (Romania) | Unitu, Cezar | 1.84 m (6 ft 0 in) | 19 – 16 November 2005 |
| | 64 | (Romania) | Omer, Naser | | 22 – 14 October 2003 |
| F | 65 | (Romania) | Cosmeanu, Robert | | 19 – 7 December 2005 |
| F | 68 | (Romania) | Began, Erik | | 21 – 1 July 2004 |

Head coach

- (Romania) Dan Fleșeriu

Assistant coach(es)

- (Romania) Valentin Boian

Legend

- (C) Team captain
- Injured

- Roster
Updated: 31 January 2024
