= CS Phoenix Galați (men's basketball) =

CSM Galați
- Nickname: Gălățenii (The People from Galați)
- Leagues: Liga Națională
- Founded: 2000; 25 years ago
- History: CS Phoenix Galați (2000–2019); CSM Galați (2019–present)
- Arena: Dunărea
- Capacity: 1,500
- Location: Galați, Romania
- Team colors: Red, Blue, White
- Team manager: Florin Atanasiu
- Head coach: Eugen Ilie
- Ownership: Galați Municipality
- Website: Official website
Home	Away

CSM Galați is a professional basketball team from Galați, Romania, formerly known as Phoenix Galați. The team plays in the Liga Națională, following their championship in the Liga I in 2015. The team finished on 7th place in the first year and reached the first round of the play-offs and in the season 2016-2017 they finished on 9th place with 8 wins plus 16 losses.

== Trophies ==
=== Domestic competitions ===
- Liga I(second basketball league)
  - Winners (1): 2014-15

== Season by season ==
Season	Tier	Division	Pos.	W–L	Romanian Cup	European competitions
2014–15	2	Liga I	1st	22–1		
2015–16	1	Liga Națională	7th	17–19		
2016–17	1	Liga Națională	9th	8–16	Quarterfinalist	
2017–18	1	Liga Națională	8th	17–16	Quarterfinalist	
2018–19	1	Liga Națională	8th	21–7		
2019–20	1	Liga Națională	10th	13–6		
2020–21	1	Liga Națională	8th	11–15		
2021–22	1	Liga Națională	14th	8–22	Semifinalist	
2022–23	1	Liga Națională	13th	19–11		
2023–24	1	Liga Națională	12th	5–25		
2024–25	1	Liga Națională	14th	4–26	1/16 Finals	

== Current roster ==
Note: Flags indicate national team eligibility at FIBA-sanctioned events. Players may hold other non-FIBA nationalities not displayed.

CS Phoenix Galați roster
Players
Coaches

Pos.	No.	Nat.	Name	Ht.
G	1	(United States)	Miller, Phillip.	1.85 m (6 ft 1 in)
G	2	(United States)	Moss, Aaron	1.85 m (6 ft 1 in)
G	4	(Romania)	Voinescu, Radu	1.81 m (5 ft 11 in)
G/F	6	(Serbia)	Đorđević, Vladimir.	1.98 m (6 ft 6 in)
	7	(Romania)	Stan, Robert
PG	9	(Romania)	Alexandru, Vlad	1.81 m (5 ft 11 in)
	10	(Romania)	Bănescu, Cezar
	12	(Romania)	Grecu, Mihai.
	13	(Romania)	Giangu, Andrei
F/C	31	(Serbia)	Đukić, Nebojša	2.06 m (6 ft 9 in)
F	33	(Romania)	Corpodean, Vlad (C)	1.93 m (6 ft 4 in)
C	34	(Montenegro)	Perović, Marko.	2.04 m (6 ft 8 in)

Head coach

- (Montenegro) Radović, Dragan

Assistant coach(es)

- (Romania) Bălănică, Bogdan

Legend

- (C) Team captain
- Injured

- Roster
Updated: 6 December 2018
