= Chadrack =

Chadrack is a masculine given name. Notable people with the name include:

- Chadrack Lufile (born 1990), Congolese-Canadian basketball player
- Chadrack Lukombe (born 1997), DR Congolese footballer
