= Deven Mitchell =

American basketball player

No. 8 – Dinamo București
- Position: Small forward
- League: Liga Națională

Personal information
- Born: October 22, 1984 (age 42) St. Louis, Missouri, U.S.
- Listed height: 6 ft 5 in (1.96 m)
- Listed weight: 210 lb (95 kg)

Career information
- High school: Kickapoo (Springfield, Missouri)
- College: Missouri State (2004–2008)
- NBA draft: 2008: undrafted
- Playing career: 2008–present

Career history
- 2008–2009: Arkadia Traiskirchen Lions
- 2009–2013: Gaz Metan Mediaş
- 2013–2014: SOMB Boulogne-sur-Mer
- 2016–present: Dinamo București

Career highlights
- Austrian League MVP (2009); 2× Romanian Cup (2011, 2013)

Deven Anthony Mitchell (born October 22, 1984) is an American basketball player for Dinamo București. Mitchell played three seasons collegiate for the Missouri State and played four seasons for CS Gaz Metan Mediaş in Romania.

== Honours ==
- (Austria) Austrian League MVP (1): 2009
- (Romania) Romanian Cup (2): 2011, 2013
