= SCM U Craiova (basketball) =

SCMU Craiova
- Nickname: Alb-Albaștrii (The White and Blues)
- League: Liga Națională; Europe Cup
- Founded: 2007; 19 years ago
- History: CSM Universitatea Craiova (2007–2008); CSM Craiova (2008–2009); SCM U Craiova (2009–present)
- Arena: Polyvalent Hall
- Capacity: 4,215
- Location: Craiova, Romania
- Team colors: White, Blue
- President: Bogdan Bălan
- Team manager: Marius Toma
- Head coach: Zare Markovski
- Website: Official website
Home	Away

SCM Universitatea Craiova is a Romanian professional basketball club based in Craiova. The club competes in Liga Națională, the top tier of Romanian basketball.

== History ==
Over the last few years, the team has also been named SCM CSS Craiova. SCM U Craiova reemerged last year on the big stage of Romanian basketball, after many years in the second division, and after withdrawing from the championship altogether, between 2004 and 2007.

In the 2012–2013 season, SCM U Craiova finished on the 4th place (21 wins - 9 losses) at the end of the season and qualified for the Play-Offs. In the first round they played against CS Gaz Metan Medias and lost with 3–0. For the 2013–2014 season, the team announced that they will play in the Balkan International Basketball League.

== Honours ==
- Liga Națională

3rd Place (1): 2026

- Romanian Cup

Runners-up (1): 2022

== Current roster ==
Note: Flags indicate national team eligibility at FIBA-sanctioned events. Players may hold other non-FIBA nationalities not displayed.

SCM U Craiova roster
Players
Coaches

Pos.	No.	Nat.	Name	Ht.	Age
F	0	(Romania)	Muresan, Andrei Cristian	2.00 m (6 ft 7 in)	23 – 30 August 2003
PF/C	2	(United States)	Dishman, De Andre Ramon	1.95 m (6 ft 5 in)	28 – 13 January 1998
PG	3	(Romania)	Toma, Matei		22 – 12 October 2004
SG	5	(Romania)	Nistor, Vlad Razvan	1.91 m (6 ft 3 in)	22 – 16 May 2004
F	7	(United States)	Beaubrun, Jalil	2.06 m (6 ft 9 in)	25 – 28 May 2001
	8	(Romania)	Mariescu, Leonardo		20 – 19 November 2005
G	9	(United States)	Polite III, Ronald	1.88 m (6 ft 2 in)	24 – 18 March 2002
PG	12	(United States)	Lilly, Kino	1.83 m (6 ft 0 in)	24 – 9 September 2002
SF	13	(Romania)	Trif, Robert	1.90 m (6 ft 3 in)	20 – 1 May 2006
PF/C	21	(Romania)	Tibirna, Bogdan (C)	2.10 m (6 ft 11 in)	35 – 7 June 1991
F	22	(United States)	Davis, Demetrius	2.03 m (6 ft 8 in)	25 – 1 January 2001
F	24	(United States)	Gordon, Justin	1.98 m (6 ft 6 in)	32 – 20 December 1993
F	25	(Romania)	Vida, David	1.96 m (6 ft 5 in)	27 – 27 July 1999
		(United States)	Durr, Michael	2.13 m (7 ft 0 in)	27 – 26 December 1998

Head coach

- (North Macedonia) Zare Markovski

Assistant coach(es)

- (Ukraine) Oleh Honcharov

Legend

- (C) Team captain
- Injured

- Roster
Updated: 07 October 2026

== Notable players ==
- (United States) Sam Sessoms
- (United States) Austin Crowley
- (Finland) Daniel Dolenc
- (Ukraine) Vitaliy Zotov
- (Finland) Shawn Hopkins
- (Finland) Topias Palmi
- (United States) Josh Hawley

== Season by season ==
Season	Tier	League	Pos.	W–L	Romanian Cup
2008–09	1	Divizia A	12th		10th
2009–10	1	Divizia A	16th		13th
2010–11	1	Divizia A	13th-14th		Quarterfinals
2011–12	1	Divizia A	11th		Eightfinals
2012–13	1	Liga Națională	5th-8th		Group Phase
2013–14	1	Liga Națională	5th-8th		Eightfinals
2014–15	1	Liga Națională	11th		Eightfinals
2015–16	1	Liga Națională	5th-8th		Quarterfinals
2016–17	1	Liga Națională	5th-8th		Quarterfinals
2017–18	1	Liga Națională	5th-8th		Eightfinals
2018–19	1	Liga Națională	4th		Quarterfinals
2019–20	1	Liga Națională	Canc. (Note: The 2019–20 season was cancelled due to the COVID-19 pandemic.)		Quarterfinals
2020–21	1	Liga Națională	5th-8th		Semifinals
2021–22	1	Liga Națională	5th-8th		Runner-up
2022–23	1	Liga Națională	6th		Semifinals
2023–24	1	Liga Națională	11th	20-11	Phase 1
2024–25	1	Liga Națională	8th	15-22	Quarterfinals
2025–26	1	Liga Națională	3rd	22-16	Quarterfinals
