= CS Agronomia București (men's basketball) =

Agronomia București
- Leagues: Liga Națională
- Founded: 2009; 16 years ago
- Arena: Arena de Baschet
- Capacity: 350
- Location: Bucharest, Romania
- Team colors: White, Green
- President: Zoltan Sáfár-Gîngu
- Head coach: Milan Sokić
Home	Away

Clubul Sportiv Agronomia București, commonly known as CS Agronomia București or simply Agronomia București, is a Romanian men's basketball club based in Bucharest, currently participates in the Liga Națională, the top-tier league in Romania.

The club initially played in the second-tier Liga I. However, in 2018 the league was merged with the top-tier Liga Națională.

== Current roster ==
Note: Flags indicate national team eligibility at FIBA-sanctioned events. Players may hold other non-FIBA nationalities not displayed.

Agronomia București roster
Players
Coaches

Pos.	No.	Nat.	Name
	0	(Romania)	Vișan, Hara
	1	(Romania)	Maschiu, Marco
	2	(Romania)	Jercălău, Robert
PG	3	(Romania)	Macavei, Filip	1.90 m (6 ft 3 in)
SF	7	(Romania)	Dudaș, Victor	1.94 m (6 ft 4 in)
	8	(Romania)	Andronache, Mihnea
	10	(Romania)	Preda, Șerban
	11	(Romania)	Mocanu, Edward
	13	(Romania)	Miloș, Cătălin
	14	(Romania)	Stan, Valentin
PG	22	(Romania)	Balmuș, Gheorghe (C)	1.80 m (5 ft 11 in)
G	23	(Romania)	Lazăr, Alexandru.	1.86 m (6 ft 1 in)
	24	(Romania)	Juncu, Mihai
	27	(Romania)	Cristea, David
	32	(Romania)	Volintiru, Alexandru
SG	35	(Romania)	Vaida, David	1.89 m (6 ft 2 in)
SF	44	(Romania)	Bodea, Matei	1.95 m (6 ft 5 in)
	45	(Romania)	Dragomir, Alexandru.
	69	(Romania)	Eremia, Lucas

Head coach

- (Serbia) Sokić, Milan

Legend

- (C) Team captain
- Injured

- Roster
Updated: 6 December 2018
