= Tavon King =

American basketball player, born 1997

CSU Sibiu
- Position: Point guard
- League: Liga Națională

Personal information
- Born: December 13, 1997 (age 28) Gates, Tennessee, U.S.
- Listed height: 1.80 m (5 ft 11 in)
- Listed weight: 79 kg (174 lb)

Career information
- High school: Halls High School (Halls, Tennessee)
- College: Columbia State CC (2017–2018); North Alabama (2018–2020); Cumberland (2021–2022)
- NBA draft: 2022: undrafted
- Playing career: 2022–present

Career history
- 2022–2023: Iskra Svit
- 2023–2024: Salon Vilpas
- 2024–2025: KTP Basket
- 2025: Ironi Kiryat Ata
- 2025–present: CSU Sibiu

Devarius Tavon King (born December 13, 1997) is an American professional basketball player for CSU Sibiu in the Romanian Liga Națională.

== Professional career ==
After finishing college, King started his professional career with Iskra Svit in Slovakia in 2022. Next season he joined Salon Vilpas in Finnish Korisliiga, and continued with fellow Finnish team KTP-Basket, averaging 17.8 points and 3.5 assists during his lone season with KTP.

On 28 February 2025, he signed with Israeli team Ironi Kiryat Ata in Ligat HaAl.
