= BC SCM Timișoara =

BC Timișoara
- Nickname: Leii din Banat (The Lions from Banat)
- Leagues: Liga Națională; Alpe Adria Cup
- Founded: 1956; 70 years ago
- History: Știința Timișoara (1950–1965); Politehnica Timișoara (1965–1987); Politehnica Elba Timișoara (1987–1995); Elba Timișoara (1995–2001); Elba Petrom Timișoara (2002–2005); BCM Elba Timișoara (2002–2010); BC Timișoara (2010–2017); BC SCM Timișoara (2017–present)
- Arena: Constantin Jude Sports Hall
- Capacity: 1,500
- Location: Timișoara, Romania
- Team colors: Purple, yellow, white
- President: Sergiu Paşca
- Head coach: Dragan Petricevic
- Championships: 2 Romanian Cup
- Website: Official website
| Home | Away | Third |

BC Timișoara is a professional basketball club, based in Timișoara, Romania. The club competes in the Liga Națională, the highest division of organized basketball in Romania. They play their home games in the Constantin Jude Sports Hall.

== History ==
The last ten years have been the most successful in the team's history. BC Timișoara has managed to qualify for the finals of various competitions eight times and won the Romanian Cup in 2010 and 2015. The team also played in the Romanian Cup final in 2007, 2008 and 2012. BC Timișoara played in the championship final in 2009 and 2012, losing each time to CSU Asesoft Ploiești. The Timișoara team qualified for the final of the Central European League in 2009, but was defeated by the Hungarian team Albacomp Székesfehérvár, with a score of 66-92.

== Season by season ==
| Season | Tier | Division | Pos. | W–L | Romanian Cup | European competitions | |
|---|---|---|---|---|---|---|---|
| 2014–15 | 1 | Liga Națională | 8th | 13–15 | Champion | | |
| 2015–16 | 1 | Liga Națională | 10th | 12–20 | | | |
| 2016–17 | 1 | Liga Națională | 5th | 13–18 | Quarterfinalist | | |
| 2017–18 | 1 | Liga Națională | 5th | 22–15 | Semifinalist | | |
| 2018–19 | 1 | Liga Națională | 6th | 15–23 | Quarterfinalist | | |
| 2019–20 | 1 | Liga Națională | 6th | 10–22 | Semifinalist | | |
| 2020–21 | 1 | Liga Națională | 7th | 14–12 | Quarterfinalist | | |
| 2021–22 | 1 | Liga Națională | 6th | 18–12 | Quarterfinalist | | |
| 2022–23 | 1 | Liga Națională | 8th | 16–18 | Quarterfinalist | Alpe Adria Cup | QF |
| 2023–24 | 1 | Liga Națională | 13th | 14–16 | | Alpe Adria Cup | RU |
| 2024–25 | 1 | Liga Națională | 9th | 14–16 | Quarterfinalist | | |

== Honours ==
=== National competitions ===
National League

- Runner-up (2): 2008–09, 2011–12

National Cup

- Winners (2): 2010, 2015
- Runner-up (3): 2007, 2008, 2012

=== European competitions ===
Alpe Adria Cup:

- Runner-up (1): 2023–24

== Current roster ==
BC Timișoara roster
Players
Coaches

| Pos. | No. | Nat. | Name | Ht. | Age |
|---|---|---|---|---|---|
| G | 0 | (United States) | Strong-Moore, Darrion | 1.85 m (6 ft 1 in) | 32 – 1 January 1994 |
| G/F | 4 | (Bosnia and Herzegovina) | Gajic, Nikola | 1.95 m (6 ft 5 in) | 35 – 15 July 1991 |
| SG | 6 | (Bulgaria) | Lilov, Ivan | 1.94 m (6 ft 4 in) | 38 – 6 August 1988 |
| F | 7 | (Romania) | Petrescu, Edward | 2.02 m (6 ft 8 in) | 27 – 22 February 1999 |
| F/C | 9 | (Montenegro) | Komatina, Miloš | 2.06 m (6 ft 9 in) | 42 – 15 September 1984 |
| G | 10 | (Romania) | Mocrițchi, Cristian | 1.87 m (6 ft 2 in) | 26 – 10 March 2000 |
| PG | 11 | (United States) | Talton, Gary | 1.85 m (6 ft 1 in) | 36 – 29 March 1990 |
| SF | 12 | (Serbia) | Mirković, Adam | 1.99 m (6 ft 6 in) | 34 – 13 November 1991 |
| C | 15 | (Romania) | Lázár, László | 2.10 m (6 ft 11 in) | 39 – 19 January 1987 |
| G/F | 20 | (North Macedonia) | Mekić, Adem | 1.97 m (6 ft 6 in) | 30 – 28 December 1995 |
| C | 22 | (Romania) | Olah, Alexandru | 2.10 m (6 ft 11 in) | 32 – 15 October 1993 |
| G | 77 | (Romania) | Schipor, Robert | 1.90 m (6 ft 3 in) | 23 – 20 June 2003 |
| SG | 99 | (United States) | Brown, Sherwood | 1.93 m (6 ft 4 in) | 35 – 2 August 1991 |

Head coach

- (Serbia) Dragan Petričević

Assistant coach(es)

- (Romania) Cristian Bota

Legend

- (C) Team captain
- Injured

- Roster
Updated: 1 January 2025

=== Notable players ===
- Set a club record or won an individual award as a professional player.
- Played at least one official international match for his senior national team at any time.

- (Romania) Catalin Baciu
- (Romania) Octavian Calota
- (Romania) Dragoș Diculescu
- (Romania) Bogdan Popa
- (Serbia) Nikola Pešaković
- (Serbia) Marko Stojadinović
- (Serbia) Vladan Vukosavljević
- (United States) Brandon Randolph
