= Meshack Lufile =

Canadian basketball player (born 1992)

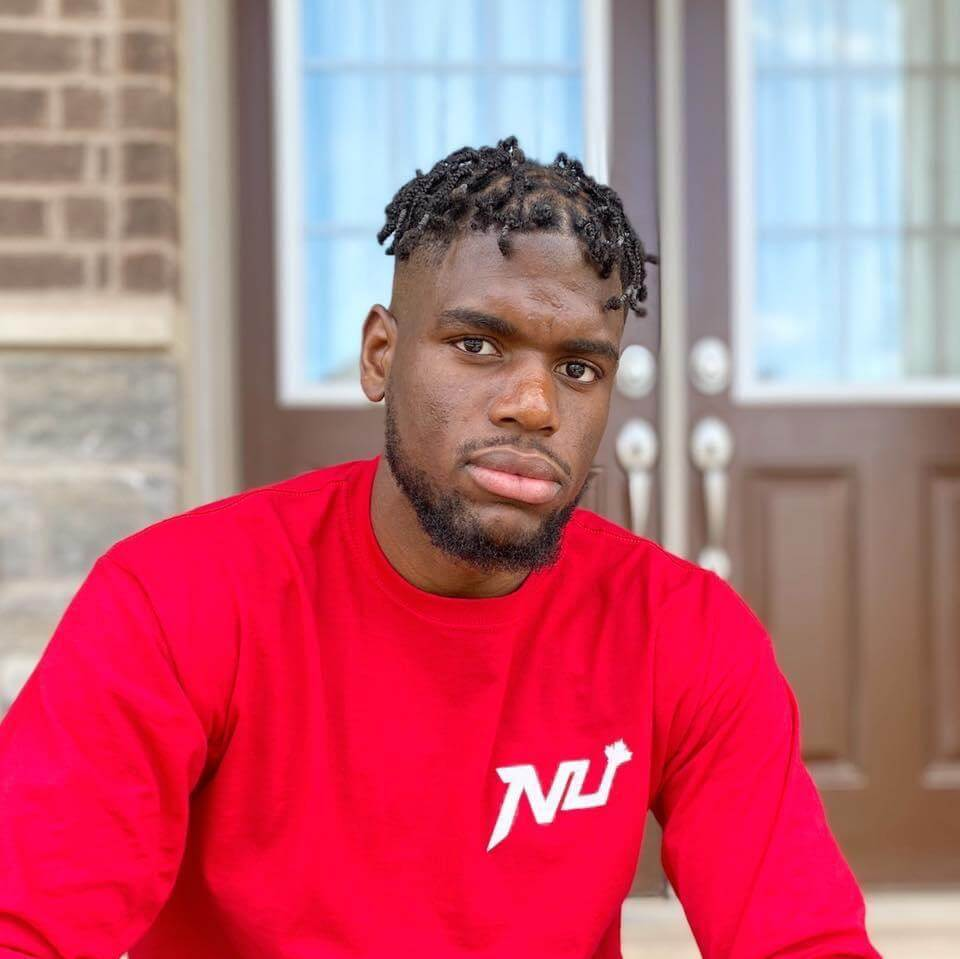

No. 24 – Slavia Prague
- Position: Center / power forward
- League: National Basketball League

Personal information
- Born: October 21, 1992 (age 34) Burlington, Ontario
- Listed height: 206 cm (6 ft 9 in)
- Listed weight: 109 kg (240 lb)

Career information
- College: Cape Breton (2012–2016)
- NBA draft: 2014: undrafted
- Playing career: 2016–present

Career history
- 2016–2017: Aris Leeuwarden
- 2017–2018: Island Storm
- 2018–2019: Halifax Hurricanes
- 2019: Guelph Nighthawks
- 2019–2020: CSM Miercurea Ciuc
- 2020–2021: Owensboro Thoroughbreds
- 2021–2022: Reading Rockets
- 2022: Newfoundland Growlers
- 2022–2023: CSM Miercurea Ciuc
- 2023: Edmonton Stingers
- 2024: Scarborough Shooting Stars
- 2024: Ottawa BlackJacks
- 2024–2025: KTP
- 2025–present: Slavia Prague

Meshack Wandja Lufile (born October 21, 1992) is a Canadian professional basketball player for Slavia Prague of the National Basketball League in the Czech Republic. Born in Burlington, Ontario Lufile made his professional debut with Aris Leeuwarden of the Dutch Basketball League. In July 2020, Meshack launched his official website to keep fans up to date about his career.

== Professional career ==
On June 16, 2016, Lufile signed with Aris Leeuwarden of the Dutch Basketball League. Lufile re-signed for a second year with Aris in July 2017. On November 9, 2017, Lufile was released by Aris. On December 30, 2017, Lufile signed with the Island Storm, a team based in his native country in the National Basketball League of Canada. He joined the Halifax Hurricanes in 2018. He joined the Guelph Nighthawks of the Canadian Elite Basketball League for its inaugural season in 2019. Lufile joined CSM Miercurea Ciuc of the Romanian league in 2019. He averaged 16.2 points and 9.0 rebounds per game. On August 23, 2021, Lufile signed with the Reading Rockets of the English NBL.

On July 26, 2024, Lufile signed with KTP of the Korisliiga.

== Personal life ==
Meshack's brothers Chadrack Lufile and Abednego Lufile are professional basketball players as well. Abednego Lufile currently plays for the London Lightning in London, Canada. Meshack Lufile also has a younger brother named Elijah Lufile who is on a basketball scholarship at Oral Roberts University of the NCAA I. Meshack is married to his wife Nicole and has a daughter with her.
