= Winston-Salem State University =

Historically black university in Winston-Salem, North Carolina, US

- Former name: List: Slater Industrial Academy (1892–1899); Slater Industrial and Slater Normal School (1899–1925); Winston-Salem Teachers College (1925–1963); Winston-Salem State College (1963–1969)
- Motto: "Enter to Learn, Depart to Serve."
- Type: Public historically black university
- Established: September 28, 1892; 134 years ago
- Parent institution: University of North Carolina
- Accreditation: SACS
- Academic affiliations: TMCF
- Endowment: $114.5 million (2025)
- Chancellor: Bonita J. Brown
- Provost: Anthony Graham
- Faculty: 400
- Administrative staff: 800
- Students: 4,776
- Location: Winston-Salem, North Carolina, United States; 36.0895°N 80.2251°W
- Campus: 117 acres (0.47 km^{2}); Midsize city
- Newspaper: The News Argus
- Colors: Scarlet and white
- Nickname: Rams
- Sporting affiliations: NCAA Division II - CIAA
- Mascot: Amon the Ram
- Website: wssu.edu

Winston-Salem State University (WSSU) is a public historically black university in Winston-Salem, North Carolina, United States. It is part of the University of North Carolina system.

== History ==
Winston-Salem State University was founded as "Slater Industrial Academy" on September 28, 1892. In 1925, the North Carolina General Assembly renamed the school "Winston-Salem Teachers College" and the North Carolina State Board of Education allowed the college to award elementary teacher education degrees, making it the first black institution to provide this specialized training.

In 2020, MacKenzie Scott donated $30 million to Winston-Salem State, the second largest single gift in the university's history. In 2025, she donated an additional $50 million, the largest single gift in the university's history.

== Academics ==
Winston-Salem State offers over 40 academic majors and 10 graduate degrees. The school enrolls approximately 5,200 students and employs 400 faculty and over 550 staff members.

=== Colleges and departments ===
- College of Arts, Sciences, Businesses, and Education
- School of Health Sciences
- Graduate and Professional Programs
- University College and Lifelong Learning

=== Rankings ===
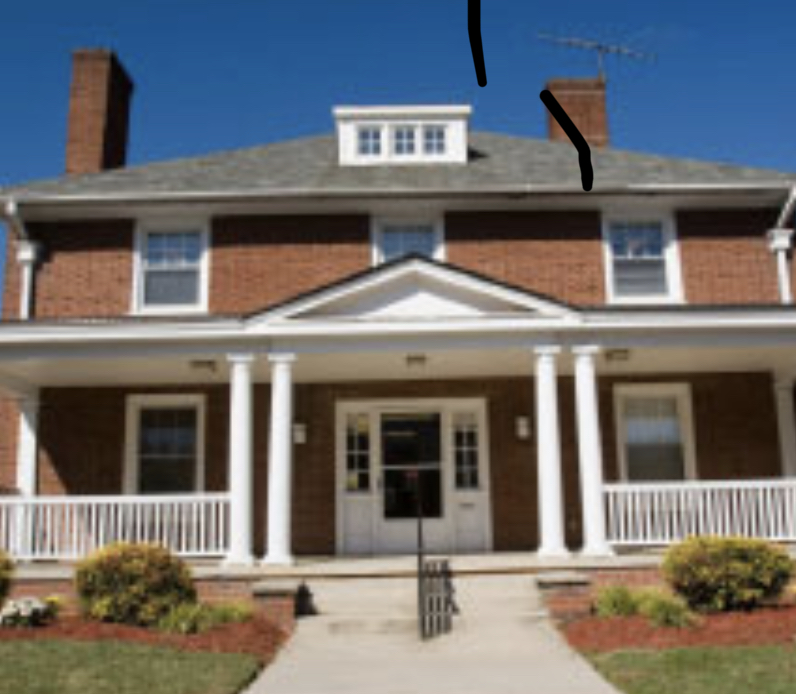
The Alumni House on campus

Winston-Salem State University was ranked the #7 top college in the United States by the Social Mobility Index college rankings.

Winston-Salem State has been ranked #27 by U.S. News & World Report in the Top Public Comprehensive Baccalaureate Colleges of the South category between 2001 and 2009. By 2016, the university had fallen to a ranking of #84 in the same category.

In 2024, Washington Monthly ranked Winston-Salem State 96th among 438 national universities in the U.S. based on Winston-Salem State's contribution to the public good, as measured by social mobility, research, and promoting public service. Washington Monthly also ranked Winston Salem State 24th in Social Mobility.

== Library ==
C. G. O'Kelly Library is the main academic library on the campus of Winston-Salem State University, which was originally the Slater Industrial Academy. The original library was housed in Blair Hall until 1967 when the new library was built and O’Kelly Library has gone through two additions and one renovation within the past forty years.

== Campus ==
The campus has more than 40 buildings covering 117 acres (0.47 km^{2}). WSSU's Diggs Gallery was recognized as one of the top African-American galleries in its region.

== Student life ==
Undergraduate demographics as of Fall 2023
Race and ethnicity	Total
Black	83%
Hispanic	5%
White	5%
Two or more races	4%
Asian	1%
International student	1%
Unknown	1%
Economic diversity
Income-based Pell Grant recipients	63%

=== Athletics ===
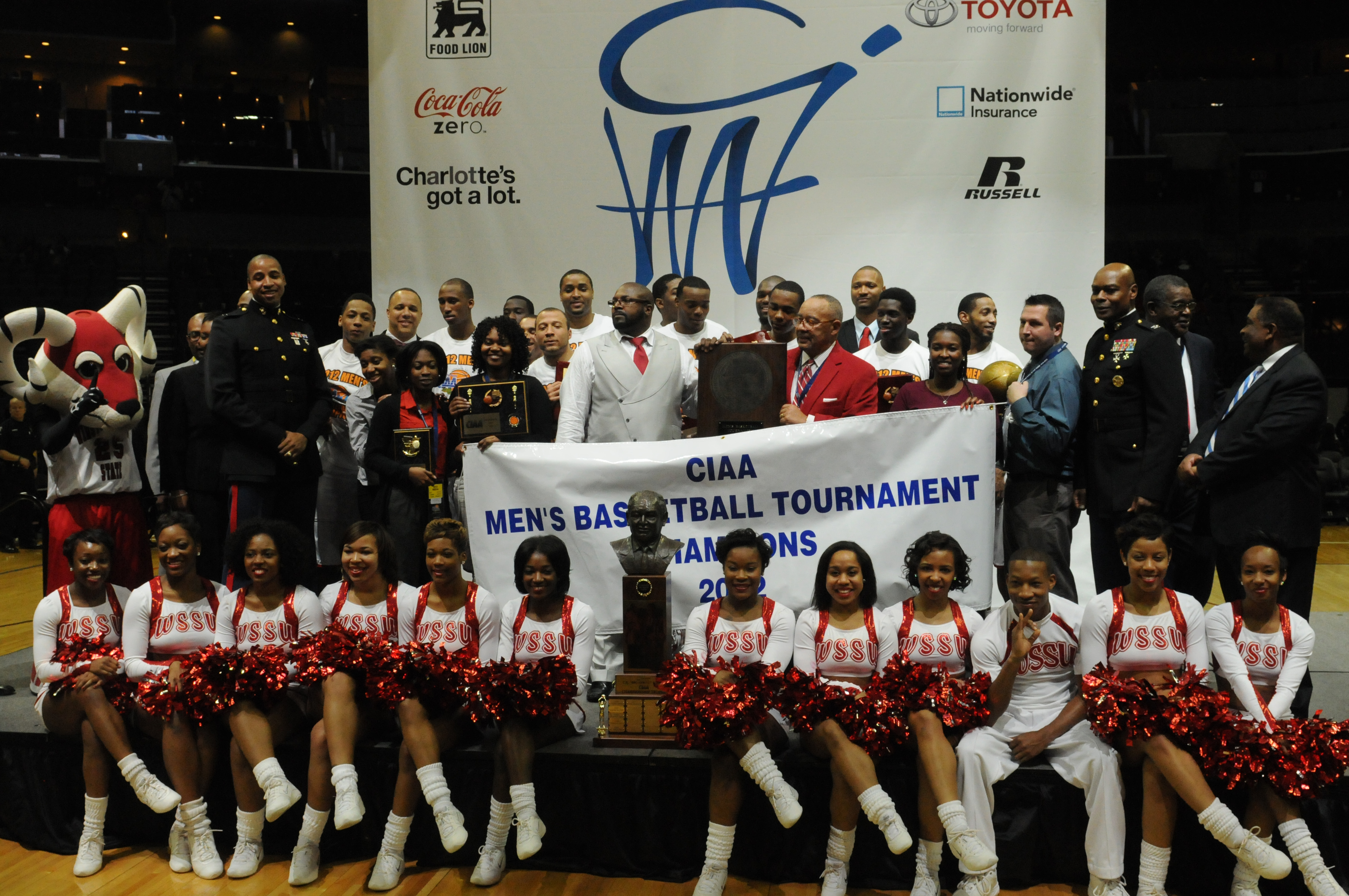
The men's basketball team and WSSU cheerleaders at the 2012 CIAA Tournament

Winston-Salem State University is currently a member of the Central Intercollegiate Athletic Association (CIAA) in NCAA Division II. From the 2006-07 season through the 2009–10 season, the Rams competed in the NCAA's Division I Mid-Eastern Athletic Conference (MEAC), despite being a transitional member that was attempting to attain full membership within the MEAC or within NCAA Division I, in which the Rams were also scheduled to begin full membership and gain access to NCAA tournaments in 2011. However, this never occurred due to financial difficulties.

=== Esports integration ===
Winston-Salem State University integrated esports into its computer science program with a $400,000 grant from the National Science Foundation’s Historically Black Colleges and Universities-Undergraduate Program. The initiative includes an esports lab, offering hands-on learning and attracting underrepresented minority students to STEM fields while expanding career paths in the esports industry.

=== Student organizations ===
There are over 100 student organizations at WSSU, including the Student Government Association, fraternities and sororities, Honor societies, and the Red Sea of Sound marching band.

== Notable alumni ==
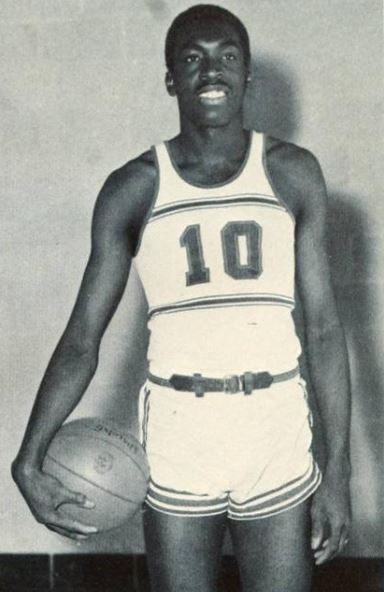
Earl Monroe, 4x NBA All-Star, NBA Champion, member of Naismith Memorial Basketball Hall of Fame, WSSU Class of 1967

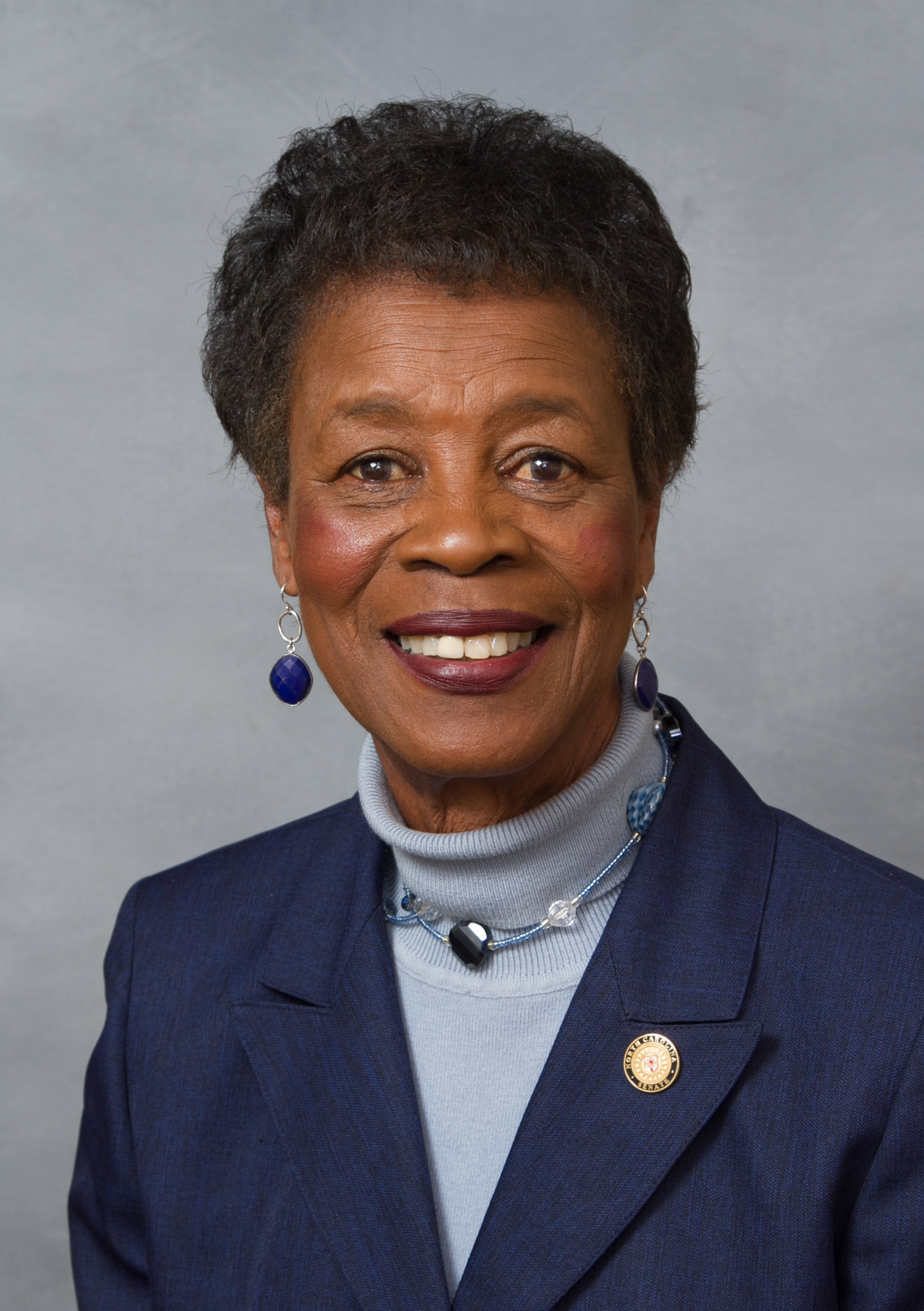
Earline W. Parmon, WSSU Class of 1977

- Ted Blunt, politician, educator, and athlete
- Rajah Caruth, professional race car driver
- Javonte Cooke, professional basketball player
- Carla Cunningham, politician
- Donald Evans, professional football player
- Louis Farrakhan, religious leader, activist, and social commentator
- Oronde Gadsden, professional football player
- Charlie Brady Hauser, educator and legislator
- William Hayes, professional football player
- Cleo Hill, professional basketball player
- Maria Howell, actress and singer
- Richard Huntley, professional football player
- Ameer Jackson, professional basketball player
- Harry Lewis, politician
- Earl "The Pearl" Monroe, professional basketball player
- Derwin L. Montgomery, politician and pastor
- Lorraine H. Morton, politician
- Timmy Newsome, professional football player
- Earline W. Parmon, politician
- Jim Reid, professional basketball player
- Shanquella Robinson, fashion designer
- Monté Ross, college basketball coach
- Marshall L. Shepard, politician and pastor
- Stephen A. Smith, ESPN personality
- Melvin Sutton, professional cheerleader
- Carlos Terry, professional basketball player
- Yancey Thigpen, professional football player
- TiaCorine, rapper
- Dennis L.A. White, actor
- Earl "The Twirl" Williams, professional basketball player
- Haywoode Workman, professional basketball player
