= CS Cuza Sport Brăila =

Cuza Sport Brăila
- Nickname: Pirații (The Pirates)
- Leagues: Liga Națională
- Founded: 2007; 18 years ago
- Arena: Sala Polivalentă Danubius
- Capacity: 2,000
- Location: Brăila, Romania
- Team colors: Yellow, Black
- President: Mircea Totolici
- Team manager: Ciprian Țelinoiu
- Head coach: Cătălin Ștefănescu
Home	Away

Clubul Sportiv Cuza Sport Brăila, commonly known as Cuza Sport Brăila or simply Cuza Sport, is a Romanian basketball club based in Brăila, currently participates in the Liga Națională, the top-tier league in Romania.

The club initially played in the second-tier Liga I. However, in 2018 the league was merged with the top-tier Liga Națională.

== Current roster ==
Note: Flags indicate national team eligibility at FIBA-sanctioned events. Players may hold other non-FIBA nationalities not displayed.

Athletic Constanța roster
Players
Coaches

Pos.	No.	Nat.	Name
G	1	(Romania)	Chiriac, Vlad	1.96 m (6 ft 5 in)
PG	6	(Romania)	Țelinoiu, Ciprian	1.83 m (6 ft 0 in)
	12	(Romania)	Koler, Alexandru
F	14	(United States)	Keyes, Joshua	2.01 m (6 ft 7 in)
G/F	24	(Romania)	Popescu, Vlad	1.92 m (6 ft 4 in)
	28	(Romania)	Beiliciu, Vlad
	29	(Romania)	Urdă, Eduard
SG	35	(Romania)	Damian, Andrei (C)	1.96 m (6 ft 5 in)
G	98	(Romania)	Voiculeț, Florin

Head coach

- (Romania) Ștefănescu, Cătălin

Assistant coach(es)

- (Romania) Țelinoiu, Ciprian

Legend

- (C) Team captain
- Injured

- Roster
Updated: 6 December 2018
