= Chadrack Lufile =

Congolese-Canadian basketball player

Free agent
- Position: Power forward

Personal information
- Born: September 11, 1990 (age 36) Kinshasa, Zaire
- Listed height: 6 ft 9 in (2.06 m)
- Listed weight: 265 lb (120 kg)

Career information
- High school: Assumption Catholic and Robert Bateman High School (Burlington, Ontario)
- College: Coffeyville CC (2010–2012); Wichita State (2012–2014)
- NBA draft: 2014: undrafted
- Playing career: 2014–present

Career history
- 2014–2015: Sioux Falls Skyforce
- 2015–2016: Puerto Montt
- 2016–2017: Cape Breton Highlanders
- 2018: St. John's Edge
- 2018–2019: Halifax Hurricanes
- 2019: Guelph Nighthawks
- 2019–2020: Estudiantes Concordia
- 2021–2022: Miercurea Ciuc
- 2022: DUC Dakar
- 2022: ABC Fighters

Chadrack Lufile (born September 11, 1990) is a Congolese-Canadian professional basketball player who last played for the ABC Fighters of the Road to BAL. Internationally, he also plays for DR Congo.

== Early life ==
Lufile was born in Zaire but left for Texas with his family as the age of three. At the age of seven, he moved to Canada. Lufile grew up playing soccer. He learned basketball at Burlington's Assumption Catholic Secondary School as a junior and grew into a prominent recruit. Lufile averaged 20 points per game as a senior and scored 33 points against Central Commerce Collegiate.

== College career ==
Lufile attended Coffeyville Community College for two seasons, averaging 11.6 points and 8.4 rebounds per game as a sophomore. Lufile played two seasons at Wichita State. He was on the team that reached the 2013 NCAA Tournament Final Four as a junior, averaging 1.6 points and 1.8 rebounds per game off the bench. He scored 12 points and pulled down eight rebounds in a 70–65 win against Saint Louis on December 1, 2013. On December 7, Lufile scored a career-high 14 points and had seven rebounds in a 71–58 win over Oral Roberts. He started 11 games and played in all 36 games as a senior, averaging 5.9 points and 5.0 rebounds per game.

== Professional career ==
In 2014, Lufile was selected in the third round of the NBA Development League draft by the Sioux Falls Skyforce. The following season, he played in Chile for Puerto Montt. Lufile spent the 2016–17 season with the Cape Breton Highlanders of NBL Canada, averaging 12 points and eight rebounds per game. In 2018, he attempted to sell his Final Four ring to pay for medical expenses for his mother, but a Wichita State fan contributed to a GoFundMe account so he would not have to sell the ring. In November 2018, Lufile signed with the St. John's Edge. After three games, he joined the Halifax Hurricanes and had 14 points and eight rebounds in his first start for the team. He joined the Guelph Nighthawks of the Canadian Elite Basketball League for its inaugural season in 2019. Lufile joined Estudiantes Concordia during the 2019–20 season and averaged 7.6 points and 5.4 rebounds per game. He was waived on March 17, 2020. On October 9, 2021, Lufile signed with CSM Miercurea Ciuc of the Romanian Liga Națională.

On March 3, 2022, Lufile was announced to be on the roster of the Senegalese club DUC for the 2022 season of the Basketball Africa League (BAL).

In November 2022, he played for Ivorian team ABC Fighters in the 2023 Road to BAL.

== National team career ==
Lufile represented the DR Congo national basketball team at the FIBA AfroBasket in 2017 and 2021.

== BAL career statistics ==
Legend
| GP | Games played | GS | Games started | MPG | Minutes per game |
| FG% | Field goal percentage | 3P% | 3-point field goal percentage | FT% | Free throw percentage |
| RPG | Rebounds per game | APG | Assists per game | SPG | Steals per game |
| BPG | Blocks per game | PPG | Points per game | **Bold** | Career high |

| Year | Team | GP | GS | MPG | FG% | 3P% | FT% | RPG | APG | SPG | BPG | PPG |
|---|---|---|---|---|---|---|---|---|---|---|---|---|
| 2022 | DUC | 5 | 2 | 11.6 | .333 | .000 | .556 | 3.4 | 1.0 | 0.2 | 0.2 | 3.4 |
| Career | | 5 | 2 | 11.6 | .333 | .000 | .556 | 3.4 | 1.0 | 0.2 | 0.2 | 3.4 |

== Personal life ==
Lufile is the son of a minister. His brothers Meshack, Abednego, and Elijah are also basketball players.
