= CN Aurel Vlaicu București =

Aurel Vlaicu București
- Leagues: Liga Națională
- Founded: 1923; 102 years ago
- Arena: Sala "Unirea"
- Capacity: 300
- Location: Dobroești, Romania
- Team colors: Yellow, Blue
- President: Ioan Țoca
- Head coach: Cristian Teodorescu
Home	Away

CN Aurel Vlaicu București, commonly known as Aurel Vlaicu București or simply CNAV, is a Romanian basketball club based in Bucharest, currently participates in the Liga Națională, the top-tier league in Romania.

The club initially played in the second-tier Liga I. However, in 2018 the league was merged with the top-tier Liga Națională.

== Current roster ==
Note: Flags indicate national team eligibility at FIBA-sanctioned events. Players may hold other non-FIBA nationalities not displayed.

Aurel Vlaicu București roster
Players
Coaches

Pos.	No.	Nat.	Name
	0	(Romania)	Andronache, Mihnea
	2	(Romania)	Popescu, Petru.
	3	(Romania)	Moș, Cristian
	5	(Romania)	Șerbănescu, Octavian
	6	(Romania)	Duca, Theodor
	11	(Romania)	Mingote, Cosmin (C)
	13	(Romania)	Dumitrescu, Răzvan
	15	(Romania)	Pascal, Andrei
	22	(Romania)	Vilcinschi, Andrei
	27	(Romania)	Spirache, Florin
	30	(Romania)	Pădureț, Angel
	33	(Romania)	Barbuceanu, Theodor

Head coach

- (Romania) Teodorescu, Cristian

Legend

- (C) Team captain
- Injured

- Roster
Updated: 6 December 2018
