= CSM BC Sighetu Marmației =

CSM Sighetu Marmației
- Leagues: Liga Națională
- Founded: 2017; 8 years ago
- Arena: Sala Liceului Tehnologic Forestier
- Capacity: 750
- Location: Sighetu Marmației, Romania
- Team colors: White, Red
- President: George Opriș
- Head coach: Emil Kosztelnik
Home	Away

Club Sportiv Municipal Baschet Club Sighetu Marmației, commonly known as CSM BC Sighetu Marmației, or simply Sighetu Marmației, is a Romanian basketball club based in Sighetu Marmației, currently participates in the Liga Națională, the top-tier league in Romania.

The club initially played in the second-tier Liga I. However, in 2018 the league was merged with the top-tier Liga Națională.

== Current roster ==
Note: Flags indicate national team eligibility at FIBA-sanctioned events. Players may hold other non-FIBA nationalities not displayed.

CSM BC Sighetu Marmației roster
Players
Coaches

Pos.	No.	Nat.	Name
	0	(Romania)	Alexandru, Cristian
	1	(Romania)	Simionca, Henrique
G	8	(United States)	Thomas, Allan.	1.93 m (6 ft 4 in)
	9	(Romania)	Kracz, Mihály
	10	(Romania)	Albu, Ciprian (C)
	11	(Romania)	Dunca, George
	13	(Romania)	Iuga, Alin
C	14	(Romania)	Țîbîrnă, Lucian	2.08 m (6 ft 10 in)
	15	(Romania)	Rareș, Cristian
	17	(Romania)	Porumb, Cristian
PG	23	(United States)	Turner, Joshua	1.93 m (6 ft 4 in)
	24	(Romania)	Zoltán, Eric
	33	(Romania)	Armand, Iuliu
F	44	(United States)	Edwards, Greg.	1.96 m (6 ft 5 in)
	52	(Romania)	Feher, Fredi

Head coach

- (Romania) Kosztelnik, Emil

Assistant coach(es)

- (Romania) Pop, Alin

Legend

- (C) Team captain
- Injured

- Roster
Updated: 6 December 2018
