= CS Universitatea Cluj (basketball) =

- Nickname: Studentii
- Leagues: Liga Națională
- Founded: 1947
- Arena: Sala Sporturilor Horia Demian
- Capacity: 2,525
- Location: Cluj-Napoca, Romania
- Team colors: White, Black
- President: Ovidiu Vasu
- Head coach: Marcel Tenter
- Website: www.u-cluj.ro
| Home | Away |

The basketball department of CS Universitatea Cluj is based in Cluj-Napoca, Romania. The club competes in the Liga Națională. The team promoted in Liga Națională in 2014 after its reaffiliation in 2013.

== Season by season ==
| Season | Tier | Division | Pos. | Postseason | RS | PO | Romanian Cup | European Competitions |
|---|---|---|---|---|---|---|---|---|
| 2013–14 | 2 | Liga I | 2 | Runner-up ▲ | | | – | – |
| 2014–15 | 1 | Liga Națională | 13 | Relegated | 0–24 | – | – | – |
