= Sala Sporturilor Mediaș =

Indoor arena in Mediaş, Romania

Coordinates: 46°08′46″N 24°19′52″E

- Mediaş Sports Hall
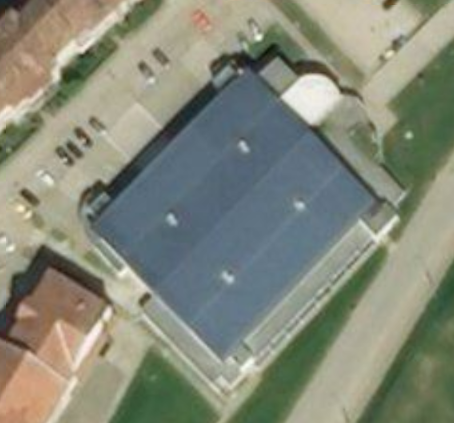
- Interactive map of Sala Sporturilor Mediaș
- Full name: Sala Sporturilor Vitrometan
- Address: Str. Lotru nr. 3
- Location: Mediaş, Romania
- Owner: Primăria Mediaș
- Capacity: 462
- Surface: Parquetry

Construction
- Opened: 1 November 2004

Tenant
- Gaz Metan Mediaş

Website
- https://csmmedias.ro/baze-sportive/

Sala Sporturilor Mediaş ("Mediaş Sports Hall"), also known as Sala Sporturilor Vitrometan, is a multi-use indoor arena in Mediaş, Romania. The capacity of the arena is 462 seats. Starting from July 2020 the sports hall was renamed "Octavian Şerban" Sports Hall.

The arena has been operating since 1 November 2004 and is under the administration of the Municipal Directorate for Culture, Sports, Tourism and Youth. Since 2017, the Sports Hall was placed under the administration and management of the Mediaș Municipal Sports Club.

It is currently home to the men's basketball club Gaz Metan Mediaş.
