= Romanian Basketball Cup =

Men's basketball competition in Romania

- Sport: Basketball
- Founded: 1954
- Country: Romania
- Continent: (European Union) Europe
- Most recent champion: U-BT Cluj-Napoca (7th title)
- Most titles: U-BT Cluj-Napoca (7 titles)
- Broadcasters: Digi Sport, Prima Sport
- Related competitions: Liga Națională

The Romanian Basketball Cup is an annual cup competition for Romanian basketball teams. The competition is played by first preliminary rounds, and then a Final Four; since 2016 the game to determine the third-placed team will not be played.

The venue of the Final Four is determined by giving one of the four teams the right to organize the tournament.

== Finals ==
Season	Champions	Score	Runner-up	Third place	Fourth place	Venue	City	Ref.
2007	Asesoft Ploiești	89–66	Elba Timișoara	CSU Sibiu	U Mobitelco Cluj-Napoca	Olimpia Sports Hall	Ploiești	
2008	Asesoft Ploiești	90–73	Elba Timișoara	CSU Sibiu	CSU Pitești	Olimpia Sports Hall	Ploiești	
2009	Asesoft Ploiești	93–63	Otopeni	Energia Rovinari	Municipal Cuadripol	Sporturilor Târgu Jiu	Târgu Jiu	
2010	Elba Timișoara	92–83	Gaz Metan Mediaș	Asesoft Ploiești	Otopeni	Constantin Jude Hall	Timișoara	
2011	Gaz Metan Mediaș	71–61	Steaua Turabo	Asesoft Ploiești	BC Mureș	Sala Sporturilor Târgu Mureș	Târgu Mureș	
2012	BCM U Piteşti	91–78	Timișoara	CSM Oradea	CSM Bucuresti	Arena de Baschet	Bucharest	
2013	Gaz Metan Mediaș	76–62	U Mobitelco Cluj-Napoca	Timișoara	Asesoft Ploiești	Constantin Jude Hall	Timișoara	
2014	Energia Rovinari	58–55	CSM Oradea	Asesoft Ploiești	BCM U Piteşti	Olimpia Sports Hall	Ploieşti	
2015	Timișoara	78–73	BC Mureș	BCMU Pitești	Atlassib Sibiu	Sala Sporturilor Trivale	Pitești	
2016	U-BT Cluj-Napoca	82–75	CSM Oradea	Dinamo București	BC Mureș	Arena Antonio Alexe	Oradea	
2017	U-BT Cluj-Napoca	79–78	BC Mureș	CSM Oradea	Steaua Eximbank	Sala Transilvania	Sibiu	
2018	U-BT Cluj-Napoca	64–61	CSM Oradea	Timișoara	Steaua Eximbank	Sepsi Arena	Sfântu Gheorghe	
2019	CSU Sibiu	88–78	CSM Oradea			BT Arena	Cluj-Napoca	
2020	U-BT Cluj-Napoca	68–61	CSM Oradea			Horia Demian Sports Hall	Cluj-Napoca	
2021	Voluntari	72–65	CSM Oradea			BT Arena	Cluj-Napoca	
2022	Voluntari	89–75	SCM Craiova			Sala Polivalentă din Craiova	Craiova	
2023	U-BT Cluj-Napoca	78-65	CSM Oradea			Sala Sporturilor Constanța	Constanța	
2024	U-BT Cluj-Napoca	84-70	Rapid București	not held		BT Arena	Cluj-Napoca	
2025	Voluntari	93-83	CSM Oradea			Oradea Arena	Oradea	

== Finals top scorers ==
Year	Player	Points
2012	(Montenegro) Darko Vujačić	26
2013	(Serbia) Zoran Krstanović	16
2014	(Canada) Sean Denison †	18
2015	(Romania) Bogdan Popescu	19
2016	(Bosnia and Herzegovina) Filip Adamović	24
2017	(Serbia) Aleksandar Rašić	21
2018	(United States) (Romania) Kris Richard†	18
2019	(Lithuania) Justas Tamulis (United States) (Romania) Kris Richard†	20
2020	(Croatia) Darko Planinic	17
2021	(Romania) Marcu Badiu	20
2022	(Romania) Marcu Badiu	19
2023	(United States) (Romania) Patrick Richard (United States) Mark Ogden Jr.†	15
2024	(United States) Jarell Eddie	23
2025	(Portugal) Travante Williams	19

† Player was not on the winning team.

== See also ==
- Romanian Women's Basketball Cup
