= CSM Focșani (men's basketball) =

Romanian association men's basketball team

- Nickname: Foc
- Division: 2nd
- Leagues: Liga nationala , Liga I
- Founded: 2017; 9 years ago
- Dissolved: August 2025
- Arena: Sala Sp. "Vrancea"
- Capacity: 2,000
- Location: Romania
- Team colors: White, Blue,Golden
- Main sponsor: consiliu local focsani
- Team manager: Mihai Petruț
- Head coach: Florin Munteanu
- Assistant: Vladoiu Petrica
- Team captain: Lucian Țîbîrnă
- Ownership: Consiliul local Focșani&Csm Focșani
- Championships: 0
- Conference titles: 0
- Division titles: 1
- Website: csmfocsani2007.ro
Home	Away

Club Sportiv Municipal Focșani, commonly known as CSM Focșani, or simply CSM, is a Romanian basketball team based in Focșani, currently participates in the Liga I, the second-tier league in Romania .It was one of the biggest power houses in Romanian basketball they had some top players including NBA prospects, but in the season 23-24 they were on the 14 spot and they needed a win to remain in the big league but they lost the game and dropped down to the second league.On 25 June the team was withdrawn from the 25-26 season and then dissolved

The team represents the men's basketball section of the multi-sport club CSM Focșani, which also include men's football, men's handball, athletics, volleyball, martial arts, judo, chess, tennis, table tennis, shooting sports and taekwondo sections.

== Current roster ==
Note: Flags indicate national team eligibility at FIBA-sanctioned events. Players may hold other non-FIBA nationalities not displayed.

CSM Focșani roster
Players
Coaches

Pos.	No.	Nat.	Name
G	2	(Romania)	Georgescu, Victor	1.86 m (6 ft 1 in)
G	4	(Romania)	Georgescu, Vlad	1.88 m (6 ft 2 in)
G	6	(Romania)	Rusu, Andrei	1.74 m (5 ft 9 in)
G/F	8	(Romania)	Cucu, Mihai
F/C	9	(Romania)	Popa, Cristi	2.04 m (6 ft 8 in)
G	12	(Romania)	Mihai, Stefan	1.80 m (5 ft 11 in)
G	19	(Romania)	Bratosin, David	1.91 m (6 ft 3 in)
F/C	14	(Romania)	Tibirna, Lucian	2.08 m (6 ft 10 in)
G/F	34	(Romania)	Chirila, Giani	1.90 m (6 ft 3 in)
F/C	32	(Romania)	Mocanu, Alex	1.95 m (6 ft 5 in)
F		(Romania)	Necula, Mihnea

Head coach

- (Romania) Munteanu Florin

Assistant coach(es)

- (Romania) Vladoiu Petrică

Legend

- (C) Team captain
- Injured

- Roster
