= CSM Mediaș (basketball) =

- Nickname: Medieșenii (The People from Mediaș); Găzarii (The Refinery Workers)
- Leagues: Liga Națională
- Founded: 2003; 23 years ago as Gaz Metan Mediaș; 2017; 9 years ago as CSM Mediaș
- History: Gaz Metan Mediaș (2003–2015); CSM Mediaș (2017–present)
- Arena: Sala Sporturilor
- Capacity: 462
- Location: Mediaș, Romania
- Team colors: White, Grey, Blue
- President: Eugen Pârvulescu
- Team manager: Ovidiu Lazăr
- Head coach: Mihai Popa
- Championships: 2 Romanian Cups
Home	Away

Clubul Sportiv Municipal Mediaș, commonly known as CSM Mediaș or simply Mediaș, is a Romanian basketball club based in Mediaș. currently participates in the Liga Națională, the top-tier league in Romania.

The team was founded in 2003 as Gaz Metan Mediaș and promoted for the first time in Liga Națională in 2004. The best place since then has been 2nd, in 2010. In the 2010–11 and 2012–13 season, the club won the Romanian Cup. In 2015 the basketball section of Gaz Metan was dissolved and in 2016 the entire club went into insolvency.

In 2017 the basketball section was refounded as a section of the Municipality of Mediaș sports club, CSM Mediaș and initially played in the second-tier, Liga I. However, in 2018 the league was merged with the top-tier Liga Națională.

== Trophies ==
- Romanian Cup

Champions (2): 2011, 2013

== Current roster ==
Note: Flags indicate national team eligibility at FIBA-sanctioned events. Players may hold other non-FIBA nationalities not displayed.

CSM Mediaș roster
Players
Coaches

Pos.	No.	Nat.	Name	Ht.
G	4	(Serbia)	Vulić, Milan	1.93 m (6 ft 4 in)
PG	5	(Romania)	Andrei, Dragoș	1.86 m (6 ft 1 in)
	9	(Romania)	Barbu, Nicolas
	10	(Romania)	Vrîncian, Radu
F	11	(Romania)	Cioacătă, Cornel	1.97 m (6 ft 6 in)
PG	12	(United States)	Storey, Kareem	1.83 m (6 ft 0 in)
PG	13	(United States)	Rosemond, Steve	1.85 m (6 ft 1 in)
PF	14	(Romania)	Nicoară, Titus (C)	2.03 m (6 ft 8 in)
PF	17	(Serbia)	Simović, Andrija	2.03 m (6 ft 8 in)
F	25	(United States)	Paul, Adam	1.96 m (6 ft 5 in)
PF	49	(Romania)	Sajin, Ștefan	2.05 m (6 ft 9 in)
F/C	98	(Romania)	Banciu, Daniel	2.03 m (6 ft 8 in)

Head coach

- (Romania) Popa, Mihai

Assistant coach(es)

- (Romania) Popa, Dan

Legend

- (C) Team captain
- Injured

- Roster
Updated: 6 December 2018

== Season by season ==
Former logo, as Gaz Metan Mediaș.

Season	Tier	League	Pos.	Romanian Cup	European competitions	
2010–11	1	Liga Națională	3rd	Champions		
2011–12	1	Liga Națională	3rd			
2012–13	1	Liga Națională	4th	Champions	3 EuroChallenge	T16
2013–14	1	Liga Națională	11th		3 EuroChallenge	T16
2014–15	1	Liga Națională	9th			
2015–16	1	Liga Națională	12th			

== Notable players ==
Note: Flags indicate national team eligibility at FIBA-sanctioned events. Players may hold other non-FIBA nationalities not displayed.

Criteria

To appear in this section a player must have either:

- Set a club record or won an individual award while at the club
- Played at least one official international match for their national team at any time
- Played at least one official NBA match at any time.

- (United States) Deven Mitchell
- (Serbia) Marko Dimitrijević
