= CSU Sibiu =

Sibiu
- Nickname: Vulturii (The Eagles)
- Leagues: Liga Națională
- Founded: 1971; 55 years ago
- History: List: CSU Sibiu (1971–1991) Balanța Sibiu (1991–1992) CSU Sibiu (1992–1996) CSU Forest Sibiu (1996–1998) CSU Astral Sibiu (1998–1999) CSU Petrom Sibiu (1999–2004) CSU Atlassib Sibiu (2004–2009) CSU Sibiu (2009–2011) CSU Atlassib Sibiu (2011–2016) BC CSU Sibiu (2016–present)
- Arena: Sala Transilvania
- Capacity: 1,850
- Location: Sibiu, Romania
- Head coach: Dan Fleseriu
- Championships: 2 Romanian Leagues
- Website: Official website
Home	Away

BC CSU Sibiu is a Romanian professional basketball club, based in Sibiu, Romania. The club competes in the Liga Națională, winning the championship in 1995 and 1999. The home arena is Transilvania Hall, a 1850-seat arena in Sibiu.

== History ==
In the 2017–18 season, Sibiu made its European debut in the FIBA Europe Cup. In the first qualifying round, it was eliminated by Pardubice, losing both legs.

== Trophies ==
- Liga Națională
  - Champions (2): 1995, 1999
  - Runners-up (1): 2018–19
- Romanian Cup
  - Champions (1): 2019

== Season by season ==
Season	Tier	Division	Pos.	W–L	Romanian Cup	European competitions		
2013–14	1	Liga Națională	5th	21–10				
2014–15	1	Liga Națională	10th	10–14	Fourth place			
2015–16	1	Liga Națională	6th	17–19				
2016–17	1	Liga Națională	4th	23–17	Fourth place			
2017–18	1	Liga Națională	4th	28–14	Quarterfinalist	4 FIBA Europe Cup	QR1	0–2

== Logos ==
Former logo

== Current roster ==
Note: Flags indicate national team eligibility at FIBA-sanctioned events. Players may hold other non-FIBA nationalities not displayed.

CSU Sibiu roster
Players
Coaches

Pos.	No.	Nat.	Name	Ht.
C	0	(United States)	Agbelese, Danny	2.03 m (6 ft 8 in)
G	2	(United States)	Threatt, Jay	1.80 m (5 ft 11 in)
F	4	(Greece)	Schizas, Stavros	1.96 m (6 ft 5 in)
PG	5	(Romania)	Baditascu, Bogdan	1.80 m (5 ft 11 in)
SG	5	(United States)	Pipkins, Jalon	1.93 m (6 ft 4 in)
PG	7	(Romania)	Dragoste, Mirel	1.85 m (6 ft 1 in)
PG	8	(Serbia)	Adamovic, Filip	1.83 m (6 ft 0 in)
C	12	(Croatia)	Colak, Mateo	2.05 m (6 ft 9 in)
C	13	(Romania)	Popa, Bogdan	2.13 m (7 ft 0 in)
SG	27	(Romania)	Zetos, Anastasios	1.97 m (6 ft 6 in)
C	42	(Romania)	Banciu, Daniel	2.01 m (6 ft 7 in)
C	45	(United States)	Gross, Alex	1.13 m (3 ft 8 in)
PG		(United States)	King, Tavon	1.80 m (5 ft 11 in)

Head coach

- (Netherlands) Geert Hammink

Assistant coach(es)

- (Romania) Vulc, Cătălin
- (Romania) Popa Calotă, Octavian

Legend

- (C) Team captain
- Injured

- Roster
Updated: October 15, 2024

== Notable players ==
To appear in this section a player must have either:
- Set a club record or won an individual award as a professional player.
- Played at least one official international match for his senior national team.

- (Romania) Lucas Tohătan
- (Lithuania) Artūras Masiulis
- (Belarus) Andrej Plotnikov
- (Belarus) Alexander Zyskunov
- (United States) Jarryd Loyd
- (Netherlands) Olaf Schaftenaar
- (Democratic Republic of the Congo) Christian Lutete
