= CSM Târgu Jiu (men's basketball) =

- Leagues: Liga Națională
- Founded: 2017; 9 years ago
- Arena: Sala Sporturilor
- Capacity: 1,500
- Location: Târgu Jiu, Romania
- Team colors: White, Blue, Sky Blue
- President: Ionuț Berca
- Head coach: Vanja Miljkovic
- Website: https://csmtargujiu.ro/
Home	Away

Clubul Sportiv Municipal Târgu Jiu is a professional basketball club from Târgu Jiu, Romania. Founded in 2017, it is the successor of Energia Târgu Jiu, dissolved in 2016. In 2018, the team promoted to the Liga Națională, as the league merged with the Liga I. The club currently competes in Romania’s Liga Națională.

For the 2024–25 season the team plays home games in Sala Sporturilor (capacity ~1,500) and has key imports like Khydarius Smith, Kaleb Higgins, Modibo Diaby, and local talents such as Andrei Bărăgan and Alexandru Berca.

CSM Târgu Jiu dominated Liga I Group C in late 2024 with high-scoring victories, including 97–61 at Cluj and 113–46 versus Craiova

The club also has a second team, CSM Târgu Jiu B, which picked up a 94–68 win on the road in Liga I back in March 2024.

== Current roster ==
Note: Flags indicate national team eligibility at FIBA-sanctioned events. Players may hold other non-FIBA nationalities not displayed.

ACS Târgu Jiu roster
Players
Coaches

Pos.	No.	Nat.	Name
G	2	(United States)	Howell, Joseph.	1.88 m (6 ft 2 in)
	4	(Romania)	Nanu, Robert
	6	(Romania)	Răceanu, Remus
F	7	(Romania)	Deconescu, Marius	2.02 m (6 ft 8 in)
PG	8	(Romania)	Bratoloveanu, Răzvan	1.85 m (6 ft 1 in)
	10	(Romania)	Neguleasa, Radu
F	12	(Romania)	Roșu, Adrian (C)	1.98 m (6 ft 6 in)
	13	(Romania)	Ilie, Octavian
	15	(Romania)	Cadu, Albert
F	23	(United States)	Patterson, Shawntez	2.01 m (6 ft 7 in)
PG	30	(Romania)	Berca, Alexandru	1.84 m (6 ft 0 in)
	31	(Romania)	Danciu, Alexandru
	77	(Romania)	Vasile, Eduard

Head coach

- (Romania) Alionescu, Claudiu

Assistant coach(es)

- (Romania) Răuț, Laurențiu

Legend

- (C) Team captain
- Injured

- Roster
Updated: 6 December 2018
