= CSM Miercurea Ciuc =

- Nickname: Ciucanii (The People from M. Ciuc); Secuii (The Szeklers)
- Leagues: Liga Națională
- Founded: 2002; 23 years ago
- History: BC Miercurea Ciuc (2002–2010); Perla Harghitei Miercurea Ciuc (2010–2015); CSM Miercurea Ciuc (2015–present)
- Arena: Erőss Zsolt Aréna
- Capacity: 1,200
- Location: Miercurea Ciuc, Romania
- Team colors: White, Red, Black
- President: Szilárd Bencze
- Team manager: Attila Demeter
- Head coach: Botond Lászlófy
Home	Away

Clubul Sportiv Municipal Miercurea Ciuc (Hungarian: Városi Sportklub Csíkszereda), commonly known as CSM Miercurea Ciuc (Hungarian: VSK Csíkszereda) or simply Miercurea Ciuc (Hungarian: Csíkszereda), is a Romanian basketball club based in Miercurea Ciuc, currently participates in the Liga Națională, the top-tier league in Romania.

The club participated in the Liga Naționala between 2012 and 2013, the relegating in the Liga I, where it played until 2017 when the club chose not to join the competition. After a year of absence at senior level CSM Miercurea Ciuc enrolled in the top-tier Liga Națională, after the 2018 merge of the top two tiers of Romanian basketball.

== Current roster ==
Note: Flags indicate national team eligibility at FIBA-sanctioned events. Players may hold other non-FIBA nationalities not displayed.

CSM Miercurea Ciuc roster
Players
Coaches

Pos.	No.	Nat.	Name
F/C	1	(United States)	Pierce, Andre	2.07 m (6 ft 9 in)
PG	4	(Slovenia)	Magušar, Matevž	1.85 m (6 ft 1 in)
	6	(Romania)	Zerkula, Zoltán
	7	(Romania)	László, Tamás.
	8	(Romania)	Bujac, Eduard
F	9	(Romania)	Olariu, Raul	1.94 m (6 ft 4 in)
G	11	(Romania)	Lokody, Mátyás	1.88 m (6 ft 2 in)
	12	(Romania)	Nagy, Sándor.
	13	(Romania)	Medgyesy, Róbert
F	15	(Romania)	Movileanu, Adrian	1.95 m (6 ft 5 in)
	22	(Romania)	Botond, Heyas
G/F	25	(Serbia)	Simeunović, Đorđe.	2.01 m (6 ft 7 in)
	31	(Romania)	Arnold, László
F	69	(Serbia)	Ostojić, Goran	2.06 m (6 ft 9 in)

Head coach

- (Romania) Lászlófy, Botond

Legend

- (C) Team captain
- Injured

- Roster
Updated: 6 December 2018
