= Dinamo Polyvalent Hall =

Indoor arena in Bucharest, Romania

Coordinates: 44.4325°N 26.1039°E

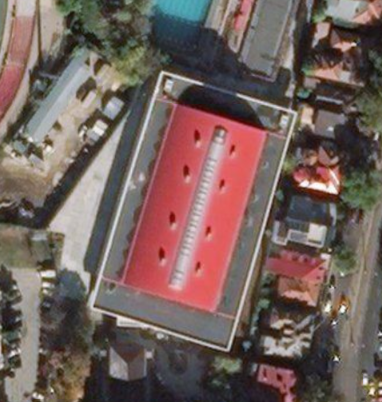
- Interactive map of Dinamo Polyvalent Hall
- Location: Bucharest, Romania
- Operator: Dinamo București
- Capacity: 2,538

Construction
- Groundbreaking: 2008
- Opened: 30 May 2013
- Cost: €9 million
- General contractor: Compania Națională de Investiții (CNI)

Tenants
- Dinamo Volley Romprest (women); Handball Club Dinamo (men); Handball Club Dinamo (women)

Dinamo Polyvalent Hall (Romanian: 'Sala Polivalentă Dinamo') is a multi-purpose indoor arena in Bucharest, Romania. It is used by the active departments of CS Dinamo București.
