= FC Argeș Pitești (men's basketball) =

Romanian basketball club

- Nickname: Vulturii Violeți (Violet Eeagles); Alb-Violeții (The White and Purples); Trupa din Trivale (The Team from Trivale)
- Leagues: Liga Națională
- Founded: 2000; 26 years ago
- History: CS Universitatea Pitești (2000–2002); BCM Pitești (2002–2005); BCMUS Argeș Pitești (2005–2009); CSU Pitești (2009–2011); BCM U Piteşti (2011–2018); BCMU FC Argeș Piteşti (2018–2020); FC Argeș Piteşti (2020–prezent)
- Arena: Pitești Arena
- Capacity: 4,900
- Location: Piteşti, Romania
- President: Dinu Gheorghe
- Team manager: Silviu Corodi
- Head coach: Milan Mitrovic
- Championships: 1 Romanian League; 1 Romanian Cup; 1 Romanian Supercup
- Website: Official website
Home	Away

FC Argeș Piteşti Basketball is a Romanian professional basketball club, based in Piteşti, Romania. The club competes in the Liga Națională, and has also been named in recent years CS Universitatea, BCM Piteşti and BCMUS Argeş Piteşti, CSU Piteşti, BCM U Piteşti and BCM U FC Argeș Piteşti. The team won the Romanian championship in 2000, and qualified for the finals in 2007, losing against CSU Asesoft. Also, the team won the Romanian Cup in the season 2011–2012 and the SuperCup in the season 2012–2013.

== History ==
In 2013 Pitești held the 2013 FIBA Europe Under-20 Championship Division B, Hristu Șapera, BCM U Pitești coach was also the coach of the Romanian National Team Under-20.

=== Season summaries ===
==== 2011–2012 ====
In the 2011–12 season, the team finished ninth in the regular season, missing qualification for the playoffs. The club nevertheless won the Romanian Cup after a 91–78 victory over BC Timișoara in the final held in Bucharest.

==== 2012–2013 ====
In the season: 2012–2013, BCM U Piteşti won the Romanian SuperCup after winning against CSU Asesoft. After the regular season end, the team finished on 11th place (13 wins – 17 losses) and went to play with BC Farul Constanța in Play-Out for remaining in the first national division. BCM U Pitesti win with 3–0 against BC Farul Constanta. Also the team participated in EuroChallenge, but finished in the group stage with 1 win and 5 losses.

==== 2013–2014 ====
In the 2013–14 season, BCM U Pitești qualified for the Final Four of the Romanian Cup after defeating U Mobitelco Cluj-Napoca in the quarter-finals. The team was eliminated by CSM Oradea in the semi-finals and later lost to CSU Ploiești in the third-place game.

Following the regular season, BCM U Pitești finished sixth and qualified for the playoffs, where the team faced BC Mureș in the quarter-finals. BCM U Pitești lost the series 3–1.

==== 2014–2015 ====
In the 2014–15 season, BCM U Pitești reached the Final Four of the Romanian Cup for the second consecutive year. The team finished third after losing to eventual winners BC Timișoara in the semi-finals and defeating CSU Sibiu in the third-place game.

In the regular season, BCM U Pitești finished fifth but was eliminated in the playoff quarter-finals by CS Energia Târgu Jiu, losing the series 3–0.

==== 2015–2016 ====
In the 2015–16 season, Pitești reached the quarter-finals of the Romanian Cup, where the team was eliminated by eventual winners U BT Cluj-Napoca following a last-second basket.

In the regular season, Pitești finished ninth and failed to qualify for the playoffs after receiving a three-point deduction due to a violation involving the club's second team during the previous season.

==== 2016–2017 ====
In the 2016–17 season, Pitești reached the playoff quarter-finals, where the team was eliminated by Steaua CSM Bucharest after losing the series 3–0. In the Romanian Cup, Pitești was eliminated in the first round by SCM U Craiova.

== Current roster ==
Note: Flags indicate national team eligibility at FIBA-sanctioned events. Players may hold other non-FIBA nationalities not displayed.

FC Argeș Piteşti roster
Players
Coaches

Pos.	No.	Nat.	Name	Ht.	Age
PF	0	(United States)	Cunningham, Josh	2.03 m (6 ft 8 in)	30 – 11 August 1996
SG	5	(Romania)	Fometescu, Tudor	1.92 m (6 ft 4 in)	27 – 9 February 1999
G	6	(Romania)	Voinescu, Radu	1.82 m (6 ft 0 in)	21 – 18 May 2005
SF	7	(Romania)	Ioniță, Flavius	1.92 m (6 ft 4 in)	29 – 19 May 1997
PF	13	(Romania)	Gavrila, Mihai	2.02 m (6 ft 8 in)	36 – 13 January 1990
C	14	(Serbia)	Jevtovic, Nikola	2.09 m (6 ft 10 in)	36 – 19 December 1989
C	15	(Romania)	Dănescu, Valentin	2.03 m (6 ft 8 in)	21 – 9 October 2004
G	20	(United States)	Freeman, Trey	1.89 m (6 ft 2 in)	33 – 12 October 1992
C	22	(Romania)	Chirof, Lucian	2.01 m (6 ft 7 in)	35 – 4 February 1991
G	23	(United States)	Massey, Bruce	1.90 m (6 ft 3 in)	35 – 2 September 1990
SF	25	(Romania)	Măciucă, Mihai	1.93 m (6 ft 4 in)	26 – 25 May 2000
SF	26	(Romania)	Andrieș, Alin	1.97 m (6 ft 6 in)	35 – 6 May 1991
PF	27	(Serbia)	Zekovic, Dragan	2.09 m (6 ft 10 in)	39 – 27 May 1987
SG	35	(Serbia)	Milutinović, Andreja	1.98 m (6 ft 6 in)	36 – 6 August 1990

Head coach

- (Serbia) Milan Mitrovic

Assistant coach(es)

- (Romania) Mihai Popoescu

Legend

- (C) Team captain
- Injured

- Roster
Updated: 23 December 2022

== Notable former players ==
- Set a club record or won an individual award as a professional player.
- Played at least one official international match for his senior national team at any time.

- (Romania) Julian Orbeanu
- (Romania) Radu Paliciuc
- (Bosnia and Herzegovina) Draško Albijanić
- (Bosnia and Herzegovina) Marko Šutalo
- (Croatia) Pankracije Barać
- (Croatia) Ivan Siriščević
- (Finland) Henri Kantonen
- (Finland) Matti Nuutinen
- (Finland) Ilari Seppälä
- (Latvia) Rihards Kuksiks
- (Montenegro) Maksim Sturanović
- (Senegal) Ousmane Barro
- (Sweden) Jonathan Person
- (Ukraine) Maksym Korniyenko
- (Ukraine) Maxsym Pustozvonov

== Notable former coaches ==
- Set a club record or won an individual award as a professional head coach.
- Coached as head coach at least one official international match for a senior national team at any time.

- (Romania) Florin Nini

== Competitive record ==
Seasons	Championships	Cups	Europe	Coach	Roster
2011–12	9th place	Winner	No tournament	Tudor Costescu	Damien Kinloch, Lucian Chirof, Alexandru Ziguli, Alexandru Neguț, Daniel Popescu, Octavian Calotă, Senai Isleam, Darko Vujacic, Georgian Păun, Ivan Stefanovic, Slobodan Popovic, Uros Velickovic
2012–13	11th place	Quarter-finals	EuroChallengeCup-group stage	Tudor Costescu	Damien Kinloch, Lucian Chirof, Daniel Popescu, Marcel Jones, Adobe Gennie, Slobodan Popovic, Alexandru Neguț, Corneliu Alexiu, Cosmin Mătăsaru, Octavian Calotă, Pancracije Barac, Drasko Albijanic
2013–14	6th place	4th place	No tournament	Hristu Șapera	Vlad Dogaru, Ante Krapic, Iulian Orbeanu, Iulian Corneanu, Marian Minea, Ousmane Barro, Pankracije Barac, Kenn Tutt, Lamonte Ulmer, Edi Sinadinovic, Marko Djurkovic, Cornel Alexiu, Lucian Chirof, Vlad Corpodean, Alexandru Neguț.
2014–15	5th place	3rd place	No tournament	Hristu Șapera	Iulian Orbeanu, Cornel Alexiu, Lucian Chirof, Cezar Stănescu, Căprărescu Mihai, Alexandru Neguț, Yurii Fraseniuk, Mirko Kovac, Marko Sutalo, Radenko Pilcevic, Ronald Ross, Stevan Milosevic, Krystopher Faber, Nemanja Kovacevic, Nemanja Maric, Dalibor Djapa
2015–16	9th place	Quarter finals	No tournament	Jovica Arsic/ Adjelko Mandic/ Hristu Șapera	Cornel Alexiu, Lucian Chirof, Căprărescu Mihai, Alexandru Neguț, Ronald Ross, Cătălin Vlaicu, Adrian Tudor, Pedja Stamenkovic, Aleksandar Mladenovic, Bogdan Stăncuț, Vyacheslav Bobrov, Maxsym Pustozvonov, Tauras Jogela, Ghiță Balmuș, Vincent Hunter, Jamar Diggs.
2016–17	6th place	1st round	No tournament	Hristu Șapera	Lucian Chirof, Căprărescu Mihai, Alexandru Neguț, Adrian Tudor, Aleksandar Mladenovic, Bogdan Stăncuț, Ghiță Balmuș, Vincent Hunter, Pavel Marinov, Vlad Corpodean, Alin Zaharie, Aleksandar Kostoski, Tomislav Gabric

== Trivale Sports Hall ==
Trivale Sports Hall (Romanian: Sala Sporturilor Trivale) is a multi-purpose indoor arena in Pitești, Romania. It is primarily used by BCM U Pitești. It has a capacity of 2,000 seats.
