= Constantin Jude Sports Hall =

Indoor arena in Timișoara, Romania

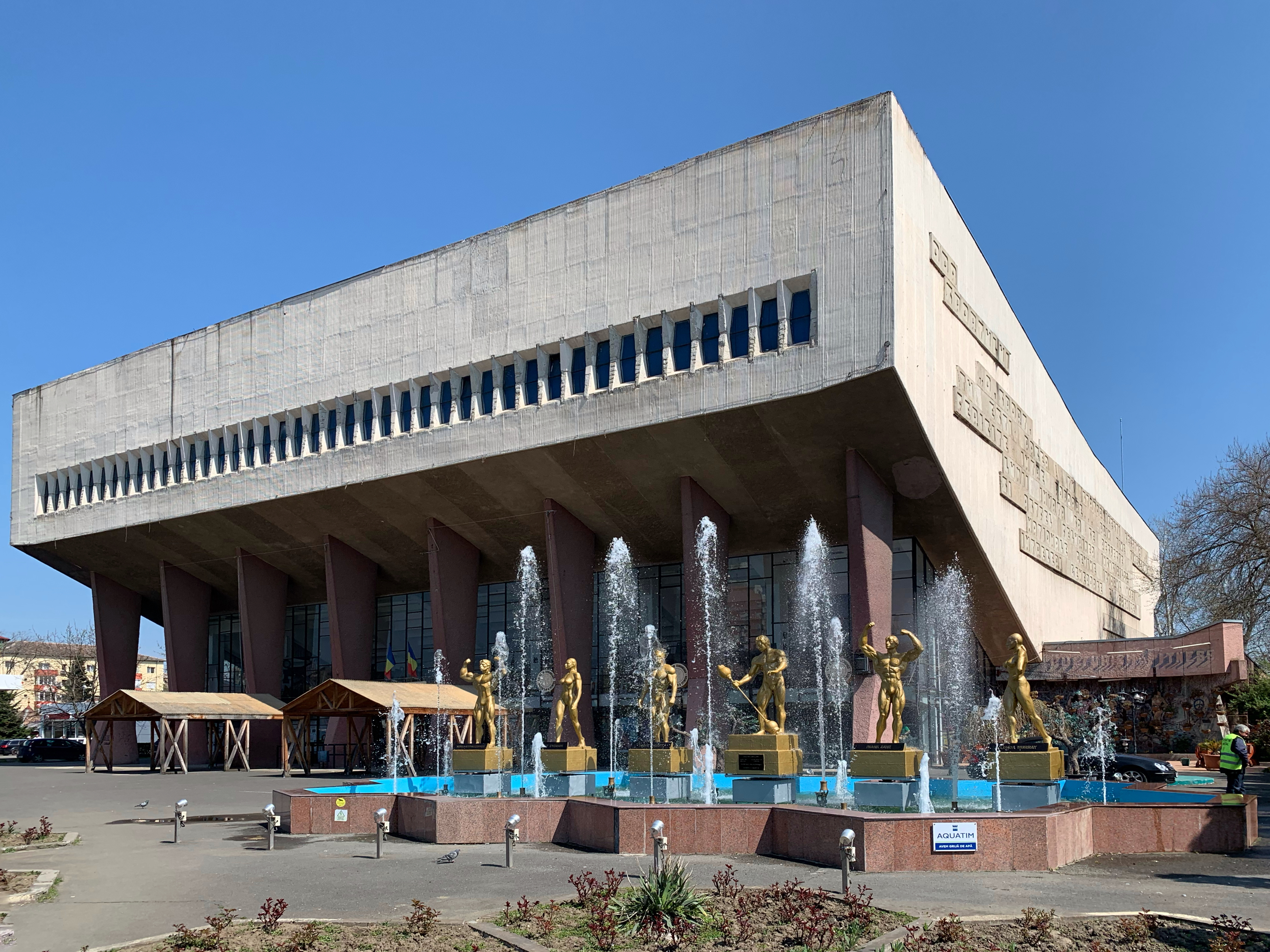
- Former names: Olimpia Hall
- Location: Timișoara, Romania
- Coordinates: 45°44′46.7″N 21°14′26.5″E
- Capacity: 1,400

Construction
- Built: 1968
- Renovated: 2011
- Architect: Sorin Gavra

Tenants
- BC Timișoara; BC Timba Timișoara; CSU Politehnica Timișoara

Constantin Jude Sports Hall (Romanian: Sala Sporturilor „Constantin Jude”) is an indoor arena in Timișoara, formerly known as Olimpia Hall (Romanian: Sala Olimpia). It was designed by architect Sorin Gavra in 1968. It is used as a base for local basketball, handball, volleyball and futsal teams. Initially, its seating capacity was 2,200, but after a rehabilitation in 2011 the capacity was reduced to 1,400 seats by mounting individual chairs.
