= Polyvalent Hall (Craiova) =

Indoor arena in Craiova, Romania

Coordinates: 44.3333°N 23.8167°E

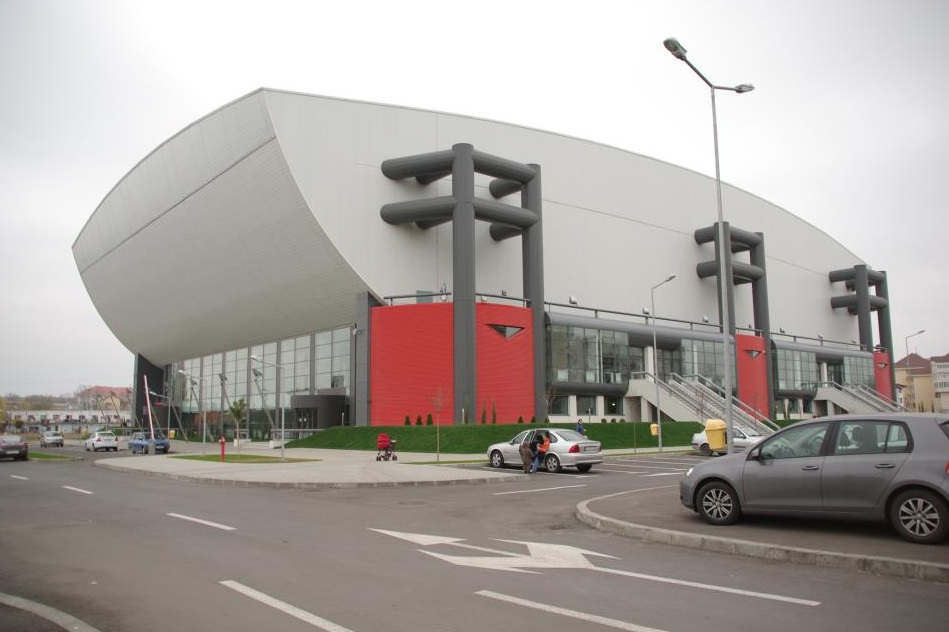
- View of venue (c.2013)
- Interactive map of Polyvalent Hall
- Address: 32 Știrbei Vodă Boulevard
- Location: Craiova, Romania
- Operator: RAADPFL
- Capacity: Basketball, Handball, Volleyball: 4,215

Construction
- Opened: 10 November 2012
- Cost: €35 million (€41 million in 2019 euros)
- General contractor: Concas S.A.

Tenants
- SCM U Craiova (Liga Națională); SCM Craiova (Liga Națională); SCM U Craiova (Divizia A1)

Polyvalent Hall from Craiova (Romanian: Sala Polivalentă din Craiova) is a multi-purpose indoor arena in Craiova, Romania. It has a seating capacity of 4,215 spectators. It is located in the immediate vicinity of the new Ion Oblemenco Stadium.

== Events ==
=== Regular events ===
==== Sports ====
- Handball
  - Carpathian Trophy – 2013
  - Carpathian Trophy – 2017
  - 2017–18 Women's EHF Cup Final – May 11, 2018
- Professional kickboxing
  - Superkombat World Grand Prix 2012 Final Elimination – November 10, 2012
  - Superkombat World Grand Prix 2013 – May 18, 2013
  - Dynamite Fighting Show 3 – December 14, 2018

==== Concerts ====
- Ștefan Bănică Jr.
- Horia Brenciu
- Richard Clayderman
- Delia
- Dire Straits
- Lara Fabian
- Loredana Groza
- Holograf
- Paula Seling
