= Liga I (men's basketball) =

Romanian basketball league

- Sport: Basketball
- No. of teams: 25
- Country: Romania
- Continent: Europe
- Most recent champions: Targu jiu & csu agronomia (24-25)
- Broadcaster: Frb tv (ytb)
- Level on pyramid: 2
- Promotion to: Liga Națională
- Related competitions: Romanian Basketball Cup

The Liga I is the second level of basketball in Romania. The league features 25 teams divided into 3 groups. The winner of the final promotion phase earns promotion to the Liga Națională.

== History ==
In 2018, the Romanian Basketball Federation (FRB) merged Liga 1 into a unified National League format with value-based groups, effectively dissolving Liga 1 as a separate competition.

In 2019, after one season under this format, the FRB reinstated Liga 1 as the official second-tier league. The reestablished Liga 1 featured teams composed exclusively of Romanian players and allowed satellite teams from top-division clubs to participate, though these teams were ineligible for promotion. Promotion and relegation between Liga 1 and the top division were maintained through playoff tournaments.
