= Serbia at the 2013 Summer Universiade =

- IOC code: SRB
- NOC: Olympic Committee of Serbia
- Website: www.oks.org.rs

in Kazan
- Competitors: 52 in 12 sports
- Medals Ranked 45th: Gold 0 Silver 1 Bronze 8 Total 9

Summer Universiade appearances (overview)
- 2007; 2009; 2011; 2013; 2015; 2017; 2019; 2021; 2025; 2027

Serbia competed at the 2013 Summer Universiade in Kazan, Russia from 6 to 17 July 2013, and won 9 medals.

== Medalists ==
Medal	Name	Sport	Event	Date
Silver	Nikolina Moldovan; Olivera Moldovan	Canoeing	K-2 200 m	15 July
Bronze	Serbia national basketball team: Darko Balaban; Miloš Dimić; Dejan Đokić; Đorđe Drenovac; Đorđe Gagić; Stefan Jović; Nikola Kalinić; Đorđe Majstorović; Nikola Malešević; Nikola Marković; Ivan Smiljanić; Stefan Živanović	Basketball	Men's tournament	16 July
Bronze	Nikolina Moldovan	Canoeing	K1 200 m	15 July
Bronze	Milica Starović	Canoeing	K1 500 m	15 July
Bronze	Nikolina Moldovan; Olivera Moldovan	Canoeing	K-2 500 m	15 July
Bronze	Nikola Milošević	Sambo	90 kg	14 July
Bronze	Borislav Mazinjanin; Igor Čotra; Milutin Stefanović	Shooting	50 metre rifle three positions team	17 July
Bronze	Serbia national water polo team: Mateja Asanović; Nikola Dedović; Marko Draksimović; Dušan Marković; Mihajlo Milićević; Miloš Miličić; Stefan Živojinović; Boris Popović; Ivan Rackov; Strahinja Rašović; Nenad Stojčić; Boris Vapenski; Srđan Vuksanović	Water polo	Men's tournament	16 July
Bronze	Zaur Efendiev	Wrestling	−74 kg	12 July

== Athletics ==
Field events

Athlete	Event	Qualification		Final	
Athlete	Event	Distance	Position	Distance	Position
Miloš Todosijević	Men's high jump	2.15	11 q	2.10	13

== Badminton ==
Men

Athlete	Event	Preliminary Round	Round of 128	Round of 64	Round of 32	Round of 16	Quarterfinals	Semifinals	Final	
Athlete	Event	Opposition Score	Opposition Score	Opposition Score	Opposition Score	Opposition Score	Opposition Score	Opposition Score	Opposition Score	Rank
Ilija Pavlović	Men's singles	Nishimoto (JPN); L 18–21, 6–21	Did not advance							

Women

Athlete	Event	Preliminary Round	Round of 32	Round of 16	Quarterfinals	Semifinals	Final	
Athlete	Event	Opposition Score	Opposition Score	Opposition Score	Opposition Score	Opposition Score	Opposition Score	Rank
Milica Simić	Women's singles	Deprez (GER); L 15–21, 21–13, 12–21	Did not advance					

Mixed

Athlete	Event	Preliminary Round	Round of 32	Round of 16	Quarterfinals	Semifinals	Final	
Athlete	Event	Opposition Score	Opposition Score	Opposition Score	Opposition Score	Opposition Score	Opposition Score	Rank
Ilija Pavlović; Milica Simić	Mixed	Bye	Towler / Smethurst (GBR); WDN	Singh / Lee (MAS); L 19–21, 21–11, 12–21	Did not advance			

== Basketball ==
=== Men's tournament ===
Team	Pld	W	L	PF	PA	PD	Pts
Serbia	5	5	0	518	265	+253	10
Romania	5	4	1	401	332	+69	9
Mexico	5	3	2	445	368	+77	8
Mongolia	5	2	3	349	458	−109	7
Japan	5	1	4	357	391	−34	6
Philippines	5	0	5	299	555	−256	5

7 July 2013
10:00

Report

Serbia	110–56	Mongolia
Scoring by quarter: 28–11, 26–19, 32–11, 24–15
Pts: Dimić 17; Rebs: Gagić 11; Asts: Đokić 7		Pts: Battuvshin 21; Rebs: Tungalag 7 Asts: Otgonbaatar, Tungalag 1

Basket-Hall Arena, Kazan
Attendance: 120
Referees: Schmidt (GER), Cross (United States), Arisawa (JPN)

8 July 2013
18:00

Report

Serbia	125–44	Philippines
Scoring by quarter: 24–15, 35–11, 29–10, 37–8
Pts: Dimić 22; Rebs: Jović, Marković 6 Asts: Đokić 10		Pts: Abad 8 Rebs: Perolino 6 Asts: 5 players 1

Basket-Hall Arena, Kazan
Attendance: 80
Referees: Vecherskis (LTU), Paulik (CZE), Vetrov (RUS)

9 July 2013
18:00

Report

Serbia	100–48	Mexico
Scoring by quarter: 23–10, 24–11, 37–14, 16–13
Pts: Marković 22; Rebs: Kalinić, Balaban 6 Asts: Živanović 4		Pts: Giron 8 Rebs: Jaimes, Nolasco 6 Asts: Calatayud 3

Basket-Hall Arena, Kazan
Attendance: 300
Referees: Vetrov (RUS), Kover (BRA), Zapolski (POL)

11 July 2013
18:00

Report

Serbia	105–64	Japan
Scoring by quarter: 27–13, 22–17, 24–16, 32–18
Pts: Gagić 14; Rebs: Kalinić 10; Asts: Živanović 5		Pts: Fujii 13; Rebs: Nagayoshi, Minagawa 4 Asts: Uto, Ikaruga 3

Miras Sports Complex
Attendance: 198
Referees: Cross (United States), Mills (AUS), Wu (HKG)

12 July 2013
18:00

Report

Serbia	78–53	Romania
Scoring by quarter: 20–10, 11–12, 19–22, 28–9
Pts: Živanović 14; Rebs: Marković 11; Asts: Kalinić 5		Pts: Toth 20; Rebs: Gutoaia, Toth 3 Asts: 4 players 2

Basket-Hall Arena, Kazan
Attendance: 250
Referees: Ovinov (RUS), Mills (AUS), Györffy (HUN)

Quarterfinal

14 July 2013
13:00

Report

Serbia	88–43	Estonia
Scoring by quarter: 18–16, 20–9, 20–14, 30–4
Pts: Drenovac, Živanović 13; Rebs: Drenovac, Marković 7 Asts: Đokić 5		Pts: Keedus 12; Rebs: Keedus 7 Asts: Keedus, Puidet 4

Basket-Hall Arena, Kazan
Referees: Mikhaylov (RUS), Mills (AUS), Al Bulushi (OMA)

Semifinal

15 July 2013
14:00

Report

Serbia	62–65	Australia
Scoring by quarter: 24-6, 13-15, 11-21, 14-23
Pts: Balaban 14; Rebs: Kalinić 10; Asts: 2 players 3		Pts: Cadee 19; Rebs: 2 players 7 Asts: Cadee 3

Basket Hall
Referees: Ayala Perez (MEX), Short (United States), Sarekoski (FIN)

Bronze-medal game

16 July 2013
19:00

Report

Canada	74–87	Serbia (bronze)
Scoring by quarter: 16–24, 21–23, 26–14, 11–26
Pts: Powell 12; Rebs: Mullings 9 Asts: Mullings 3		Pts: Gagić 24; Rebs: Smiljanić 8 Asts: Živanović 6

Basket Hall
Referees: Mikhaylov (RUS), Mills (AUS), Kover (BRA)

== Canoeing ==
Men

Athlete	Event	Heats		Semifinals		Final	
Athlete	Event	Time	Rank	Time	Rank	Time	Rank
Miloš Petrović	C1 500 m	2:23.099	5 QS	2:07.989	5	Did not advance	
Miloš Petrović	C1 1000 m	4:44.975	5 QS	4:56.738	6	Did not advance	

Legend: QF = Qualified for Final; QS = Qualified for Semifinal

Women

Athlete	Event	Heats		Semifinals		Final	
Athlete	Event	Time	Rank	Time	Rank	Time	Rank
Nikolina Moldovan	K1 200 m	42.822	1 QF	BYE		42.401	3rd place, bronze medalist(s)
Milica Starović	K1 500 m	2:06.314	2 QF	BYE		1:58.659	3rd place, bronze medalist(s)
Nikolina Moldovan; Olivera Moldovan	K-2 200 m	40.078	1 QF	BYE		38.026	2nd place, silver medalist(s)
Nikolina Moldovan; Olivera Moldovan	K-2 500 m	5:02.886	6 QS	1:51.689	1 QF	1:48.749	3rd place, bronze medalist(s)

Legend: QF = Qualified for Final; QS = Qualified for Semifinal

== Chess ==
Men

Athlete	I round	II round	III round	IV round	V round	VI round	VII round	VIII round	IX round	Rank
Athlete	Opposition Result	Opposition Result	Opposition Result	Opposition Result	Opposition Result	Opposition Result	Opposition Result	Opposition Result	Opposition Result	Rank
Miloš Lapčević	Mooketsi (BOT); L 0–1	Mohamad (INA); W 1–0	Esenov (TKM); W 1–0	Sjugirov (RUS); D 0.5–0.5	Baryshpolets (UKR); L 0–1	Galmandakh (MGL); L 0–1	Soares (ANG); W 1–0	Rajapakse (SRI); L 0–1	Kalniņš (LAT); W 1–0	43
Nikola Nestorović	Lee (KOR); W 1–0	Amin (EGY); D 0.5–0.5	Andriasian (ARM); L 0–1	Nguyen (VIE); L 0–1	Kalniņš (LAT); W 1–0	Zulkifli (MAS); D 0.5–0.5	Hajbok (ROU); L 0–1	Mohamad (INA); W 1–0	Gaehler (SUI); D 0.5–0.5	42
Ivan Šarenac	Chaulagain (NEP); W 1–0	Moranda (POL); L 0–1	Kalniņš (LAT); D 0.5–0.5	Olebile (BOT); D 0.5–0.5	Haibayev (TKM); W 1–0	Tazbir (POL); L 0–1	Munenga (ZAM); L 0–1	Gaehler (SUI); L 0–1	Fernandes (ANG); W 1–0	58

Women

Athlete	I round	II round	III round	IV round	V round	VI round	VII round	VIII round	Final round	Rank
Athlete	Opposition Result	Opposition Result	Opposition Result	Opposition Result	Opposition Result	Opposition Result	Opposition Result	Opposition Result	Opposition Result	Rank
Sandra Đukić	Nakirwadde (UGA); W 1–0	Arabidze (GEO); D 0.5–0.5	Guramishvili (GEO); L 0–1	Rothebarth (BRA); W 1–0	Przeździecka (POL); D 0.5–0.5	Kalinina (UKR); L 0–1	Khulan (MGL); W 1–0	Andrenko (UKR); L 0–1	Anusca (ROU); D 0.5–0.5	34
Anđelija Stojanović	Khulan (MGL); W 1–0	Hallaeva (TKM); W 1–0	Bodnaruk (RUS); L 0–1	Motyčáková (SVK); W 1–0	Tan (CHN); L 0–1	Kazimova (AZE); D 0.5–0.5	Martinez (ARG); W 1–0	Umudova (AZE); D 0.5–0.5	Mammadyarova (AZE); D 0.5–0.5	15

Mixed

Athletes	Played	Won	Tie	Lost	Points	Berger	Rank
Miloš Lapčević; Nikola Nestorović; Anđelija Stojanović	27	11	7	9	14.5	31.25	11

== Judo ==
Men

Athlete	Event	Round of 64	Round of 32	Round of 16	Quarterfinals	Semifinals	Final	
Athlete	Event	Opposition Result	Opposition Result	Opposition Result	Opposition Result	Opposition Result	Opposition Result	Rank
Ljubiša Kovačević	Lightweight	Bye	Kanafin (KAZ); W 100–000	Dawson (GBR); L 000–110	Did not advance			
Miroljub Ivezić	Welterweight	Bye	Wu (TPE); W 001–000	Csoknyai (HUN); L 000–101	Did not advance			
Aleksandar Kukolj	Middleweight	Bye	Zarzeczy (POL); W 100–000	Jurečka (CZE); L 000–100	Did not advance			

Repechage rounds

Athlete	Event	First repechage round	Second repechage round	Repechage quarterfinals	Repechage semifinals	Bronze final	
Athlete	Event	Opposition Result	Opposition Result	Opposition Result	Opposition Result	Opposition Result	Rank
Miroljub Ivezić	Welterweight	Bye	Chaparyan (ARM); W 011–010	Carollo (ITA); W 110–000	Gao (CHN); L 000–101	Did not advance	
Aleksandar Kukolj	Middleweight	Bye	Bye	Bauža (LTU); W 100–000	Miranda (ITA); W 100–000	Voprosov (RUS); L 000–010	5th

== Sambo ==
Men

Athlete	Event	Round of 32	Round of 16	Quarterfinals	Semifinals	Repechage	Bronze medal	Final	
Athlete	Event	Opposition Result	Opposition Result	Opposition Result	Opposition Result	Opposition Result	Opposition Result	Opposition Result	Rank
Nikola Milošević	90 kg	Bye	Lesiak (BLR); W 2–0	Rumyantsev (RUS); L 0–4	Did not advance	Meleaschevici (MDA); W 9–0	Uehara (JPN); W 4–2	Did not advance	3rd place, bronze medalist(s)

Women

Athlete	Event	Round of 32	Round of 16	Quarterfinals	Semifinals	Repechage	Bronze medal	Final	
Athlete	Event	Opposition Result	Opposition Result	Opposition Result	Opposition Result	Opposition Result	Opposition Result	Opposition Result	Rank
Jelena Žabić	72 kg	Bye	Obregon (MEX); W 12–0	Savenko (UKR); L 0–1	Did not advance				

== Shooting ==
Men

Athlete	Event	Qualification		Final	
Athlete	Event	Points	Rank	Points	Rank
Borislav Mazinjanin	10 metre air rifle	615.6	23	Did not advance	
Igor Čotra	10 metre air rifle	617.4	17	Did not advance	
Milutin Stefanović	10 metre air rifle	613.6	30	Did not advance	
Borislav Mazinjanin	50 metre rifle 3 positions	1144	25	Did not advance	
Igor Čotra	50 metre rifle 3 positions	1160	6 Q	393.6	7
Milutin Stefanović	50 metre rifle 3 positions	1151	18	Did not advance	
Borislav Mazinjanin	50 metre rifle prone	611.4	23	Did not advance	
Igor Čotra	50 metre rifle prone	609.0	31	Did not advance	
Milutin Stefanović	50 metre rifle prone	602.7	49	Did not advance	
Borislav Mazinjanin; Igor Čotra; Milutin Stefanović	10 metre air rifle team	—N/a		1846.6	5
Borislav Mazinjanin; Igor Čotra; Milutin Stefanović	50 metre rifle 3 positions team	—N/a		3455	3rd place, bronze medalist(s)
Borislav Mazinjanin; Igor Čotra; Milutin Stefanović	50 metre rifle prone team	—N/a		1823.1	11

Women

Athlete	Event	Qualification		Final	
Athlete	Event	Points	Rank	Points	Rank
Danica Rašeta	10 metre air pistol	373	25	Did not advance	
Danica Rašeta	25 metre pistol	562	20	Did not advance	

== Swimming ==
Men

Athlete	Event	Heat		Semifinal		Final	
Athlete	Event	Time	Rank	Time	Rank	Time	Rank
Boris Stojanović	50 m freestyle	23.18	7	Did not advance			
Radovan Siljevski	100 m freestyle	50.76	5	Did not advance			
Boris Stojanović	100 m freestyle	50.82	3	Did not advance			
Radovan Siljevski	50 m butterfly	24.32	2 Q	24.19	8	Did not advance	
Radovan Siljevski	100 m butterfly	54.52	4	Did not advance			

Women

Athlete	Event	Heat		Semifinal		Final	
Athlete	Event	Time	Rank	Time	Rank	Time	Rank
Tijana Vukanović	50 m butterfly	28.73	2	Did not advance			
Tijana Vukanović	100 m butterfly	1:03.18	3	Did not advance			
Tijana Vukanović	200 m butterfly	2:21.06	4 Q	2:22.24	6	Did not advance	

== Water polo ==
Preliminary round

Team	GP	W	D	L	GF	GA	GD	Pts
Italy	5	4	0	1	63	37	+26	8
Serbia	5	4	0	1	61	28	+33	8
United States	5	2	1	2	47	34	+13	5
Brazil	5	2	1	2	52	42	+10	5
Montenegro	5	2	0	3	56	39	+17	4
Belgium	5	0	0	5	13	112	–99	0

5 July 2013; 15:30	Report	Serbia	9–5	Montenegro	Burevestnik Swimming Pool; Referees: C, Gerzanich (RUS)
5 July 2013; 15:30	Report	Score by quarters: 2–1, 3–1, 2–1, 2–2			Burevestnik Swimming Pool; Referees: C, Gerzanich (RUS)
5 July 2013; 15:30	Report	Vuksanović 3	Goals	Murišić 2	Burevestnik Swimming Pool; Referees: C, Gerzanich (RUS)

7 July 2013; 12:30	Report	Serbia	7–8	Italy	Burevestnik Swimming Pool; Referees: Boros-Djevi (AUS), Szekely (HUN)
7 July 2013; 12:30	Report	Score by quarters: 0–1, 1–2, 4–2, 2–3			Burevestnik Swimming Pool; Referees: Boros-Djevi (AUS), Szekely (HUN)
7 July 2013; 12:30	Report	Rašović 3	Goals	Luongo, Coppoli 2	Burevestnik Swimming Pool; Referees: Boros-Djevi (AUS), Szekely (HUN)

8 July 2013; 14:00	Report	Serbia	9–5	United States	Burevestnik Swimming Pool; Referees: Szekely (HUN), Shimizu (JPN)
8 July 2013; 14:00	Report	Score by quarters: 1–1, 2–1, 1–1, 5–2			Burevestnik Swimming Pool; Referees: Szekely (HUN), Shimizu (JPN)
8 July 2013; 14:00	Report	four players 2	Goals	five players 1	Burevestnik Swimming Pool; Referees: Szekely (HUN), Shimizu (JPN)

10 July 2013; 12:30	Report	Serbia	14–8	Brazil	Burevestnik Swimming Pool; Referees: Tahara (JPN), Deslieres (CAN)
10 July 2013; 12:30	Report	Score by quarters: 3–2, 5–2, 2–2, 4–2			Burevestnik Swimming Pool; Referees: Tahara (JPN), Deslieres (CAN)
10 July 2013; 12:30	Report	Rackov, Vuksanović 3	Goals	Baches Delgado 2	Burevestnik Swimming Pool; Referees: Tahara (JPN), Deslieres (CAN)

11 July 2013; 12:30	Report	Serbia	22–2	Belgium	Burevestnik Swimming Pool; Referees: Deslieres (CAN), Tahara (JPN)
11 July 2013; 12:30	Report	Score by quarters: 6–0, 5–1, 4–1, 7–0			Burevestnik Swimming Pool; Referees: Deslieres (CAN), Tahara (JPN)
11 July 2013; 12:30	Report	Rackov 6	Goals	Verschuren 2	Burevestnik Swimming Pool; Referees: Deslieres (CAN), Tahara (JPN)

Quarterfinal

13 July 2013; 15:30	Report	Serbia	15–7	Japan	Burevestnik Swimming Pool; Referees: Mebuke (GEO), Stavropoulos (GRE)
13 July 2013; 15:30	Report	Score by quarters: 2–3, 3–1, 5–2, 5–1			Burevestnik Swimming Pool; Referees: Mebuke (GEO), Stavropoulos (GRE)
13 July 2013; 15:30	Report	Dedović, Vapenski 3	Goals	Takei 5	Burevestnik Swimming Pool; Referees: Mebuke (GEO), Stavropoulos (GRE)

Semifinal

15 July 2013; 20:00	Report	Serbia	11–12	Russia	Burevestnik Swimming Pool; Referees: Stavropoulos (GRE), Peila (USA)
15 July 2013; 20:00	Report	Score by quarters: 5–3, 1–6, 2–2, 3–1			Burevestnik Swimming Pool; Referees: Stavropoulos (GRE), Peila (USA)
15 July 2013; 20:00	Report	Dedović 5	Goals	Rizov-Alenichev 5	Burevestnik Swimming Pool; Referees: Stavropoulos (GRE), Peila (USA)

Bronze-medal match

17 July 2013; 11:15	Report	Italy	10–12	Serbia (bronze)	Burevestnik Swimming Pool; Referees: Szekely (HUN), Franulović (CRO)
17 July 2013; 11:15	Report	Score by quarters: 1–5, 4–2, 3–2, 2–3			Burevestnik Swimming Pool; Referees: Szekely (HUN), Franulović (CRO)
17 July 2013; 11:15	Report	di Somma, Luongo 3	Goals	Vuksanović 5	Burevestnik Swimming Pool; Referees: Szekely (HUN), Franulović (CRO)

== Weightlifting ==
Women

Athlete	Event	Snatch		Clean & jerk		Total	Rank
Athlete	Event	Result	Rank	Result	Rank	Total	Rank
Silvana Vukas	63 kg	71	16	95	15	166	15

== Wrestling ==
Key:

- VT - Victory by Fall.
- PP - Decision by Points - the loser with technical points.
- PO - Decision by Points - the loser without technical points.

Greco-Roman

Athlete	Event	Qualification Round	Round of 16	Quarterfinal	Semifinal	Repechage 1	Repechage 2	Final / BM	
Athlete	Event	Opposition Result	Opposition Result	Opposition Result	Opposition Result	Opposition Result	Opposition Result	Opposition Result	Rank
Stefan Ninković	84 kg	Santiago (BRA); L 1–3	Did not advance						

Freestyle

Athlete	Event	Qualification Round	Round of 16	Quarterfinal	Semifinal	Repechage 1	Repechage 2	Final / BM	
Athlete	Event	Opposition Result	Opposition Result	Opposition Result	Opposition Result	Opposition Result	Opposition Result	Opposition Result	Rank
Zaur Efendiev	74 kg	Bye	Martinez Navarro (ESP); W 4–0	Pervachuk (UKR); W 4–0	Hasanov (AZE); L 1–3	Bye	Bye	Grigoryan (ARM); W 5–0	3rd place, bronze medalist(s)
