= Basketball at the 2013 Summer Universiade =

Basketball at the XXVII Summer Universiade
- Venue: various
- Dates: July 7, 2013 – July 16, 2013
- Teams: 24 (men); 16 (women)

Basketball was contested at the 2013 Summer Universiade from July 7 to July 16 in Kazan, Russia. In total, 40 teams competed in the 2013 Summer Universiade (24 men's teams and 16 women's teams).

== Medal summary ==
=== Medal table ===
Rank	Nation	Gold	Silver	Bronze	Total
1	Russia (RUS)*	1	1	0	2
2	United States (USA)	1	0	0	1
3	Australia (AUS)	0	1	1	2
4	Serbia (SRB)	0	0	1	1
Totals (4 entries)		2	2	2	6

=== Medal events ===
Event	Gold	Silver	Bronze
Men	Russia (RUS); Pavel Antipov; Semyon Antonov; Nikita Balashov; Maxim Grigoryev; Vladimir Ivlev; Sergey Karasev; Dmitry Khvostov; Dmitry Kulagin; Evgeny Valiev; Artem Vikhrov; Victor Zaryazhko; Andrey Zubkov	Australia (AUS); Matthew Andronicos; Cameron Bairstow; Todd Blanchfield; Ryan Broekhoff; Jason Cadee; Andrija Dumovic; Cody Ellis; Igor Hadziomerovic; Mitch Norton; Owen Odigie; Clint Steindl; Mitchell Young	Serbia (SRB); Darko Balaban; Miloš Dimić; Dejan Đokić; Đorđe Drenovac; Đorđe Gagić; Stefan Jović; Nikola Kalinić; Đorđe Majstorović; Nikola Malešević; Nikola Marković; Ivan Smiljanić; Stefan Živanović
Women	United States (USA); Crystal Bradford; Aaryn Ellenberg-Wiley; Reshanda Gray; Cassandra Harberts; Bria Hartley; Jordan Hooper; Kaleena Mosqueda-Lewis; Tricia Liston; Ariel Massengale; Theresa Plaisance; Shoni Schimmel; Odyssey Sims	Russia (RUS); Tatiana Abrikosova; Veronika Dorosheva; Ekaterina Fedorenkova; Evgeniia Finogentova; Tatiana Grigoryeva; Nadezhda Grishaeva; Anastasia Loginova; Anastasia Logunova; Nadezda Mayorova; Liubov Paskalenko; Anastasiya Shilova; Natalia Vieru	Australia (AUS); Sara Blicavs; Natalie Burton; Stephanie Cumming; Katie-Rae Ebzery; Alice Kunek; Emma Langford; Tessa Lavey; Tess Madgen; Lauren Mansfield; Olivia Thompson; Marianna Tolo

== Men ==
=== Teams ===
Americas	Asia - Pacific	Europe	Host nation
Brazil; Canada; Chile; Mexico; United States	Australia; China; Japan; Mongolia; Oman; Philippines; South Korea; United Arab Emirates	Czech Republic; Estonia; Finland; Germany; Lithuania; Norway; Romania; Serbia; Sweden; Ukraine	Russia

== Women ==
=== Teams ===
Americas	Asia	Europe	Oceania	Host nation
Brazil; Canada; United States	China; Chinese Taipei; Japan; Mongolia	Belgium; Czech Republic; Finland; Hungary; Poland; Sweden; Ukraine	Australia	Russia
