= Basketball at the 2013 Summer Universiade – Men's tournament =

Men's basketball at the XXVII Summer Universiade
- Venue: various
- Dates: July 7, 2013 – July 16, 2013
- Teams: 24

Medalists
1st place, gold medalist(s)		Russia (RUS)
2nd place, silver medalist(s)		Australia (AUS)
3rd place, bronze medalist(s)		Serbia (SRB)

The men's tournament of basketball at the 2013 Summer Universiade in Kazan began on July 7 and end on July 16. Russia won the tournament after beating Australia in the final.

== Teams ==
Americas	Asia	Europe	Oceania	Host nation
Brazil; Canada; Chile; Mexico; United States	China; Japan; Mongolia; Oman; Philippines; South Korea; United Arab Emirates	Czech Republic; Estonia; Finland; Germany; Lithuania; Norway; Romania; Serbia; Sweden; Ukraine	Australia	Russia

== Preliminary round ==
=== Group A ===
Team	Pld	W	L	PF	PA	PD	Pts
Russia	5	5	0	510	215	+295	10
Estonia	5	4	1	324	330	−6	9
Germany	5	3	2	405	304	+101	8
South Korea	5	2	3	409	449	−40	7
Ukraine	5	1	4	350	378	−28	6
Oman	5	0	5	220	542	−322	5

7 July 2013
18:00

Report

Germany	59–65 (OT)	Estonia
Scoring by quarter: 3–6, 10–15, 17–21, 23–11, Overtime: 6–12

Basket Hall

7 July 2013
20:30

Report

Ukraine	98–100 (OT)	South Korea
Scoring by quarter: 20–24, 15–24, 31–19, 22–21, Overtime: 10–12

Basket Hall

7 July 2013
21:00

Report

Russia	117–24	Oman
Scoring by quarter: 29–6, 28–6, 29–4, 31–8

Basket Hall

8 July 2013
10:00

Report

South Korea	126–77	Oman
Scoring by quarter: 34–12, 20–15, 35–24, 37–26

Miras Sports Complex

8 July 2013
10:30

Report

Germany	78–58	Ukraine
Scoring by quarter: 18–14, 17–17, 25–13, 18–14

Basket Hall

8 July 2013
21:00

Report

Russia	106–43	Estonia
Scoring by quarter: 24–10, 25–13, 26–4, 31–16

Basket Hall

9 July 2013
10:30

Report

Germany	123–32	Oman
Scoring by quarter: 34–7, 23–11, 42–7, 24–7

Basket Hall

9 July 2013
13:00

Report

Ukraine	52–71	Estonia
Scoring by quarter: 14–18, 14–23, 15–14, 9–16

Basket Hall

9 July 2013
21:00

Report

Russia	113–53	South Korea
Scoring by quarter: 27–14, 30–15, 33–13, 23–11

Basket Hall

11 July 2013
10:00

Report

Estonia	77–52	Oman
Scoring by quarter: 32–18, 12–15, 16–4, 17–15

Basket Hall

11 July 2013
12:30

Report

Germany	93–69	South Korea
Scoring by quarter: 24–16, 22–13, 28–15, 19–25

Basket Hall

11 July 2013
21:00

Report

Russia	94–43	Ukraine
Scoring by quarter: 23–14, 22–10, 21–13, 28–6

Basket Hall

12 July 2013
12:30

Report

Ukraine	99–35	Oman
Scoring by quarter: 25–9, 32–10, 19–9, 23–7

Basket Hall

12 July 2013
12:30

Report

South Korea	61–68	Estonia
Scoring by quarter: 17–13, 14–20, 18–17, 12–18

Miras Sports Complex

12 July 2013
21:00

Report

Russia	80–52	Germany
Scoring by quarter: 15–7, 22–15, 23–16, 20–14

Basket Hall

=== Group B ===
Team	Pld	W	L	PF	PA	PD	Pts
Serbia	5	5	0	413	221	+192	10
Romania	5	4	1	315	274	+41	9
Mexico	5	3	2	326	301	+25	8
Mongolia	5	2	3	277	379	−102	7
Japan	5	1	4	284	340	−56	6
Philippines	5	0	5	0	100	−100	5

Note: Philippines has been disqualified because of leaving the tournament before the quarterfinal round. All their matches have been cancelled and assigned defeats by 0–20.

7 July 2013
10:00

Report

Serbia	110–56	Mongolia
Scoring by quarter: 28–11, 26–19, 32–11, 24–15
Pts: Dimić 17; Rebs: Gagić 11; Asts: Đokić 7		Pts: Battuvshin 21; Rebs: Tungalag 7 Asts: Otgonbaatar, Tungalag 1

Basket-Hall Arena
Attendance: 120
Referees: Boris Schmidt (GER), Gina Cross (USA), Shigeyuki Arisawa (JPN)

7 July 2013
10:30

Report

Romania	20–0	Philippines

Basket Hall

7 July 2013
13:00

Report

Japan	71–83	Mexico
Scoring by quarter: 16–20, 19–21, 22–22, 14–'20

Basket Hall

8 July 2013
10:00

Report

Romania	77–57	Japan
Scoring by quarter: 20–9, 18–13, 19–18, 20–17

Basket Hall

8 July 2013
12:30

Report

Mexico	108–54	Mongolia
Scoring by quarter: 25–13, 29–12, 29–18, 25–11

Basket Hall

8 July 2013
18:00

Report

Serbia	20–0	Philippines

Basket-Hall Arena

9 July 2013
10:00

Report

Romania	89–72	Mongolia
Scoring by quarter: 23–19, 23–15, 24–16, 19–22

Basket Hall

9 July 2013
12:30

Report

Japan	20–0	Philippines

Basket Hall

9 July 2013
18:00

Report

Serbia	100–48	Mexico
Scoring by quarter: 23–10, 24–11, 37–14, 16–13
Pts: Marković 22; Rebs: Kalinić, Balaban 6 Asts: Živanović 4		Pts: Giron 8 Rebs: Jaimes, Nolasco 6 Asts: Calatayud 3

Basket-Hall Arena
Attendance: 300
Referees: Evgeny Vetrov (RUS), Fabio Kover (BRA), Dariusz Zapolski (POL)

11 July 2013
18:00

Report

Philippines	0–20	Mongolia

Basket Hall

11 July 2013
18:00

Report

Serbia	105–64	Japan
Scoring by quarter: 27–13, 22–17, 24–16, 32–18
Pts: Gagić 14; Rebs: Kalinić 10; Asts: Živanović 5		Pts: Fujii 13; Rebs: Nagayoshi, Minagawa 4 Asts: Uto, Ikaruga 3

Miras Sports Complex
Attendance: 198
Referees: Gina Cross (USA), Tim Mills (AUS), Zhiwei Wu (HKG)

11 July 2013
20:30

Report

Romania	76–67	Mexico
Scoring by quarter: 15–15, 22–16, 10–18, 29–18

Basket Hall

12 July 2013
10:00

Report

Japan	72–75	Mongolia
Scoring by quarter: 11–20, 27–8, 16–20, 18–27

Basket Hall

12 July 2013
18:00

Report

Serbia	78–53	Romania
Scoring by quarter: 20–10, 11–12, 19–22, 28–9
Pts: Živanović 14; Rebs: Marković 11; Asts: Kalinić 5		Pts: Toth 20; Rebs: Gutoaia, Toth 3 Asts: 4 players 2

Basket-Hall Arena
Attendance: 250
Referees: Semen Ovinov (RUS), Tim Mills (AUS), Pal Attila Györffy (HUN)

12 July 2013
20:30

Report

Mexico	20–0	Philippines

Basket Hall

=== Group C ===
Team	Pld	W	L	PF	PA	PD	Pts
Canada	5	5	0	494	336	+158	10
Australia	5	4	1	462	329	+133	9
United States	5	3	2	488	351	+137	8
Czech Republic	5	2	3	331	385	−54	7
Sweden	5	1	4	329	371	−42	6
United Arab Emirates	5	0	5	255	587	−332	5

7 July 2013
12:30

Report

Czech Republic	57–85	Australia
Scoring by quarter: 11–21, 21–15, 11–35, 14–14

Basket Hall

7 July 2013
18:30

Report

United States	140–46	United Arab Emirates
Scoring by quarter: 35–16, 34–7, 31–11, 40–12

Basket Hall

7 July 2013
20:30

Report

Canada	84–69	Sweden
Scoring by quarter: 19–10, 24–15, 19–26, 22–18

Miras Sports Complex

8 July 2013
12:30

Report

Australia	70–53	Sweden
Scoring by quarter: 13–12, 16–7, 19–14, 22–20

Miras Sports Complex

8 July 2013
13:00

Report

United States	96–53	Czech Republic
Scoring by quarter: 20–9, 21–13, 25–16, 30–15

Basket Hall

8 July 2013
20:30

Report

Canada	137–43	United Arab Emirates
Scoring by quarter: 31–12, 36–15, 33–12, 37–4

Miras Sports Complex

10 July 2013
10:30

Report

Czech Republic	100–54	United Arab Emirates
Scoring by quarter: 19–13, 28–11, 21–16, 32–14

Basket Hall

10 July 2013
13:00

Report

Canada	92–83	Australia
Scoring by quarter: 27–15, 14–31, 24–21, 27–16

Basket Hall

10 July 2013
21:00

Report

United States	83–65	Sweden
Scoring by quarter: 18–17, 19–10, 27–17, 19–21

Basket Hall

11 July 2013
10:00

Report

United Arab Emirates	69–79	Sweden
Scoring by quarter: 13–20, 16–16, 18–22, 22–21

Miras Sports Complex

11 July 2013
18:30

Report

United States	84–93	Australia
Scoring by quarter: 19–20, 24–20, 21–19, 20–34

Basket Hall

11 July 2013
20:30

Report

Canada	87–56	Czech Republic
Scoring by quarter: 10–19, 18–15, 30–12, 29–10

Miras Sports Complex

12 July 2013
10:00

Report

Australia	131–43	United Arab Emirates
Scoring by quarter: 34–10, 31–10, 35–8, 31–15

Olymp Sport Hall

12 July 2013
12:30

Report

Czech Republic	65–63	Sweden
Scoring by quarter: 18–15, 14–17, 21–14, 12–17

Olymp Sport Hall

12 July 2013
13:00

Report

Canada	94–85	United States
Scoring by quarter: 18–17, 28–19, 23–22, 25–27

Basket Hall

=== Group D ===
Team	Pld	W	L	PF	PA	PD	Pts
Lithuania	5	5	0	486	294	+192	10
Brazil	5	4	1	434	294	+140	9
Finland	5	3	2	340	316	+24	8
Norway	5	2	3	341	353	−12	7
China	5	1	4	349	510	−161	6
Chile	5	0	5	266	449	−183	5

7 July 2013
10:00

Report

Finland	71–52	Chile
Scoring by quarter: 18–16, 18–12, 17–10, 18–14

Miras Sports Complex

7 July 2013
12:30

Report

Brazil	107–65	China
Scoring by quarter: 24–17, 26–15, 26–16, 31–17

Miras Sports Complex

7 July 2013
18:00

Report

Lithuania	94–71	Norway
Scoring by quarter: 23–15, 33–23, 23–18, 15–15

Miras Sports Complex

8 July 2013
10:00

Report

China	74–106	Norway
Scoring by quarter: 11–26, 14–19, 15–26, 34–35

Olymp Sport Hall

8 July 2013
12:30

Report

Finland	65–75	Brazil
Scoring by quarter: 15–16, 13–23, 20–20, 17–16

Olymp Sport Hall

8 July 2013
18:00

Report

Lithuania	116–51	Chile
Scoring by quarter: 34–12, 29–8, 37–18, 16–13

Miras Sports Complex

10 July 2013
10:00

Report

Brazil	106–40	Chile
Scoring by quarter: 27–11, 25–9, 26–3, 28–17

Basket Hall

10 July 2013
12:30

Report

Finland	60–55	Norway
Scoring by quarter: 9–16, 21–10, 8–13, 22–16

Basket Hall

10 July 2013
18:00

Report

Lithuania	129–52	China
Scoring by quarter: 34–20, 34–6, 23–16, 38–10

Basket Hall

11 July 2013
10:30

Report

Chile	48–62	Norway
Scoring by quarter: 7–14, 11–18, 9–8, 21–22

Basket Hall

11 July 2013
12:30

Report

Lithuania	77–69	Brazil
Scoring by quarter: 22–16, 19–14, 16–18, 20–21

Miras Sports Complex

11 July 2013
13:00

Report

Finland	93–64	China
Scoring by quarter: 20–12, 18–14, 25–19, 30–19

Basket Hall

12 July 2013
10:00

Report

Lithuania	70–51	Finland
Scoring by quarter: 18–7, 19–14, 17–7, 16–23

Miras Sports Complex

12 July 2013
18:00

Report

China	94–75	Chile
Scoring by quarter: 34–19, 19–23, 24–19, 17–14

Olymp Sport Hall

12 July 2013
20:30

Report

Brazil	77–47	Norway
Scoring by quarter: 18–14, 23–15, 20–10, 16–8

Olymp Sport Hall

== Classification rounds ==
=== Quarterfinal round ===
==== 17th–24th place ====
14 July 2013
10:00

Report

Sweden	80–49	Chile
Scoring by quarter: 15–6, 17–13, 26–10, 22–20

Basket Hall

14 July 2013
12:30

Report

China	62–64	United Arab Emirates
Scoring by quarter: 25–16, 11–15, 15–17, 11–16

Basket Hall

14 July 2013
18:00

Ukraine	20–0	Philippines

Basket Hall

14 July 2013
20:30

Report

Japan	123–40	Oman
Scoring by quarter: 27–14, 35–11, 26–9, 35–6

Basket Hall

==== 9th–16th place ====
14 July 2013
10:00

Report

United States	91–51	Norway
Scoring by quarter: 17–15, 26–10, 21–15, 27–11

Miras Sports Complex

14 July 2013
10:30

Report

Germany	101–68	Mongolia
Scoring by quarter: 18–20, 31–18, 28–15, 24–15

Basket Hall

14 July 2013
12:30

Report

Finland	70–52	Czech Republic
Scoring by quarter: 20–9, 14–14, 19–15, 17–14

Miras Sports Complex

14 July 2013
13:00

Report

Mexico	98–70	South Korea
Scoring by quarter: 24–21, 25–12, 31–19, 18–18

Basket Hall

=== Semifinal round ===
==== 21st–24th place ====
15 July 2013
18:00

Chile	20–0	Philippines

Biek Tau Sports Complex

15 July 2013
20:30

Report

Oman	53–89	China
Scoring by quarter: 9–20, 14–18, 18–29, 12–22

Biek Tau Sports Complex

==== 17th–20th place ====
15 July 2013
18:00

Report

Ukraine	73–75	Sweden
Scoring by quarter: 16–16, 25–20, 16–16, 16–23

Olymp Sport Hall

15 July 2013
20:30

Report

Japan	79–63	United Arab Emirates
Scoring by quarter: 16–15, 23–24, 16–12, 24–12

Olymp Sport Hall

==== 13th–16th place ====
15 July 2013
18:00

Report

Mongolia	54–83	Norway
Scoring by quarter: 6–26, 16–15, 19–19, 13–23

Basket Hall

15 July 2013
20:30

Report

South Korea	92–88 (OT)	Czech Republic
Scoring by quarter: 17–26, 21–17, 21–21, 17–12, Overtime: 16–12

Basket Hall

==== 9th–12th place ====
15 July 2013
10:00

Report

Germany	70–92	United States
Scoring by quarter: 19–17, 13–29, 19–19, 19–27

Miras Sports Complex

15 July 2013
12:30

Report

Mexico	70–82	Finland
Scoring by quarter: 17–18, 13–21, 21–22, 19–21

Miras Sports Complex

==== 5th–8th place ====
15 July 2013
18:00

Report

Romania	82–75	Brazil
Scoring by quarter: 26–23, 13–13, 16–16, 27–23

Miras Sports Complex

15 July 2013
20:30

Report

Estonia	61–82	Lithuania
Scoring by quarter: 13–20, 15–17, 20–27, 13–18

Miras Sports Complex

=== Final round ===
==== 23rd-place game ====
16 July 2013
12:30

Oman	20–0	Philippines

Olymp Sport Hall

==== 21st place game ====
16 July 2013
10:00

Report

Chile	76–72	China
Scoring by quarter: 22–18, 11–23, 18–12, 25–19

Olymp Sport Hall

==== 19th-place game ====
16 July 2013
10:00

Report

Ukraine	107–54	United Arab Emirates
Scoring by quarter: 32–4, 33–14, 18–20, 24–16

Miras Sports Complex

==== 17th-place game ====
16 July 2013
10:00

Report

Sweden	62–50	Japan
Scoring by quarter: 16–6, 17–15, 15–15, 14–14

Basket Hall

==== 15th-place game ====
16 July 2013
12:30

Report

Mongolia	80–94	Czech Republic
Scoring by quarter: 17–18, 22–24, 25–31, 16–21

Miras Sports Complex

==== 13th-place game ====
16 July 2013
12:30

Report

Norway	79–77	South Korea
Scoring by quarter: 24–17, 21–13, 20–23, 14–24

Basket Hall

==== 11th-place game ====
16 July 2013
15:00

Report

Germany	64–71	Mexico
Scoring by quarter: 18–20, 16–11, 16–30, 14–10

Miras Sports Complex

==== 9th-place game ====
16 July 2013
15:00

Report

United States	97–70	Finland
Scoring by quarter: 25–20, 27–6, 20–18, 25–26

Basket Hall

==== 7th-place game ====
16 July 2013
10:30

Report

Brazil	63–67	Estonia
Scoring by quarter: 22–21, 11–13, 21–16, 9–17

Basket Hall

==== 5th-place game ====
16 July 2013
13:00

Report

Romania	50–87	Lithuania
Scoring by quarter: 7–18, 15–25, 12–20, 16–24

Basket Hall

== Elimination round ==
Quarterfinals
A1	Russia	78
B2	Romania	53
C1	Canada	88
D2	Brazil	77
B1	Serbia	88
A2	Estonia	43
D1	Lithuania	55
C2	Australia	60

Semifinals
A1	Russia	78
C1	Canada	68
B1	Serbia	62
C2	Australia	65

Gold-medal game
A1	Russia	81
C2	Australia	74
Bronze-medal game
C1	Canada	74
B1	Serbia	87

=== Quarterfinals ===
14 July 2013
13:00

Report

Serbia	88–43	Estonia
Scoring by quarter: 18–16, 20–9, 20–14, 30–4
Pts: Drenovac, Živanović 13; Rebs: Drenovac, Marković 7 Asts: Đokić 5		Pts: Keedus 12; Rebs: Keedus 7 Asts: Keedus, Puidet 4

Basket-Hall Arena
Referees: Sergey Mikhaylov (RUS), Tim Mills (AUS), Ahmed Al Bulushi (OMA)

14 July 2013
18:00

Report

Canada	88–77	Brazil
Scoring by quarter: 17–20, 21–17, 21–15, 29–25
Pts: Heslip 20; Rebs: Powell, Klassen 6 Asts: Pangos, P. Scrubb 4		Pts: Silva 15; Rebs: Deodato 6 Asts: three players 4

Miras Sports Complex
Attendance: 537
Referees: Mindaugas Vecherskis (LTU), Thomas Short (USA), Yrjo Johannes Sarekoski (FIN)

14 July 2013
18:30

Report

Lithuania	55–60	Australia
Scoring by quarter: 20–11, 8–15, 17–14, 10–20
Pts: Čižauskas, Juškevičius 16; Rebs: Juškevičius, Drungilas 8 Asts: Čižauskas 2		Pts: Broekhoff 14; Rebs: Young 7 Asts: four players 2

Miras Sports Complex
Referees: Boris Schmidt (GER), José Ayala Pérez (MEX), Viktor Bozhenar (UKR)

14 July 2013
21:00

Report

Russia	78–53	Romania
Scoring by quarter: 17–15, 16–12, 21–12, 24–14
Pts: Karasev 22; Rebs: Karasev 9 Asts: Grigoryev 5		Pts: Țibîrnă 18; Rebs: Țibîrnă 7 Asts: Petrișor, Török 2

Basket Hall
Attendance: 2,000
Referees: Reid Allan Kenyon (CAN), Saulius Racys (LTU), Kihamu Matsumoto (JPN)

=== Semifinals ===
15 July 2013
14:00

Report

Serbia	62–65	Australia
Scoring by quarter: 24–6, 13–15, 11–21, 14–23
Pts: Balaban 14; Rebs: Kalinić 10; Asts: Jović, Kalinić 3		Pts: Cadee 19; Rebs: Dumovic, Bairstow 7 Asts: Cadee 3

Basket Hall
Referees: José Ayala (MEX), Thomas Short (USA), Yrjo Johannes Sarekoski (FIN)

15 July 2013
16:30

Report

Russia	78–68	Canada
Scoring by quarter: 22–11, 21–15, 21–18, 14–24
Pts: Karasev 20; Rebs: Karasev 10; Asts: Karasev 7		Pts: three players 12; Rebs: T. Scrubb, Mullings 7 Asts: Mullings, P. Scrubb 3

Basket Hall
Attendance: 2,500
Referees: Boris Schmidt (GER), Stanislav Kucera (CZE), Rodrigo Oliveros (CHI)

=== Bronze-medal game ===
16 July 2013
19:00

Report

Canada	74–87	Serbia
Scoring by quarter: 16–24, 21–23, 26–14, 11–26
Pts: Powell 12; Rebs: Mullings 9 Asts: Mullings 3		Pts: Gagić 24; Rebs: Smiljanić 8 Asts: Živanović 6

Basket Hall
Referees: Sergey Mikhaylov (RUS), Tim Mills (AUS), Fábio Kover (BRA)

=== Gold-medal game ===
16 July 2013
21:30

Report

Russia	81–74	Australia
Scoring by quarter: 25–15, 16–16, 24–26, 16–17
Pts: Zubkov 19; Rebs: Karasev, Zubkov 6 Asts: three players 3		Pts: Steindl, Bairstow 21; Rebs: Dumovic 9 Asts: Cadee 7

Basket Hall
Referees: Mindaugas Vecherskis (LTU), Boris Schmidt (GER), Reid Kenyon (CAN)

== Final standings ==
Place	Team	Score
1st place, gold medalist(s)	Russia	8-0
2nd place, silver medalist(s)	Australia	6-2
3rd place, bronze medalist(s)	Serbia	7-1
4	Canada	6-2
5	Lithuania	7-1
6	Romania	5-3
7	Estonia	5-3
8	Brazil	6-2
9	United States	6-2
10	Finland	5-3
11	Mexico	5-3
12	Germany	4-4
13	Norway	4-4
14	South Korea	3-5
15	Czech Republic	3-5
16	Mongolia	2-6
17	Sweden	4-4
18	Japan	3-5
19	Ukraine	2-5
20	United Arab Emirates	1-7
21	Chile	1-6
22	China	2-6
23	Oman	0-7
24	Philippines	0-5
