= 2007–08 BC Mures season =

BC Mures finished the 2007–2008 half season in 8th place with a record of 7 wins and 6 losses. The team had the best offense in the Romanian first division with 1163 points (89,46 points/game), but also held the worst defense record with 1164 (89,53 points/game). Midway through the season, Troy Selvey and (Canada) Jon Clark were waived by the management, even though both players were loved by the fans of BC Mures. To replace these players, management signed two players from the United States: Louis Truscott a 29-year-old, 200 cm and Frank Edward Russell, a 24-year-old, 211 cm center. Jay Anderson, the forward who was injured in the team's first game, missed the entire season and was replaced by Luke McKenna. BC Mures finished the regular season in 8th place with a record of 15 wins and 11 losses. The team led in points scored, but also in points conceded.

In the first round of the playoffs, BC Mures were paired against league leaders Asesoft Ploiesti. After losing the first away game by a narrow margin, they were defeated on their home court in an elimination game. Playing for the 5-8th place with playmaker JuJuan Cooley out, the team did not get another win, cementing their position as eighth in the league.

Major Squad changes after end of season

The Romanian Basketball Federation decided to increase the number of participants for the 08–09 season from 14 clubs to 16 clubs. In this case none of the clubs that played in the last season relegated to div. 2. CS Energia Rovinari and CSS U Craiova are the two new summer clubs that will complete the Romanian Basketball Division A team list. After the folding of the Rm. Valcea club there were only 15 teams left to start the championship race.

== 2007–2008 squad changes ==
In

- (Canada) Jon Clark – signed from RSV Eintracht Stahnsdorf
- (Romania) Biro Ferenc – signed from Gaz Metan Medias
- (United States) Luke Mckenna – signed for the first half of the season (extended for the season)
- (United States) Louis Truscott – signed for the second half of the season from
- (United States) Frank Edward Russell – signed for the second half of the season from Rutgers Scarlet Knights

Out

- (Romania) George Trif – signed to CSM Oradea
- (United States) Troy Selvey – waived in December 2007 (half season)
- (Canada) Jon Clark – waived in December 2007 (half season)

== 2007–2008 roster ==
Bc Mures 2007/2008 roster
1	(Romania)	Biro Ferenc	205 cm	97 kg	Center
3	(United States)	JuJuan Cooley	175 cm	75 kg	Guard
4	(Romania)	Bogdan Cormos	177 cm	70 kg	Guard
5	(Romania)	Tibor Soos	183 cm	70 kg	Guard
8	(Romania)	Daniel Patru	192 cm	92 kg	Forward
10	(Romania)	Barnabas Szaszgaspar	183 cm	82 kg	Guard
12	(Romania)	Vlad Pora	193 cm	91 kg	Guard
14	(Romania)	Cristian Jakab	205 cm	92 kg	Center
15	(United States)	Bryan McCullough	198 cm	95 kg	Guard
20	(Romania)	Bogdan Puscas	194 cm	87 kg	Forward
10	(Romania)	Ioan Mureşan	182 cm	85 kg	Guard
33	(United States)	Luke McKenna	201 cm	100 kg	Forward
21	(United States)	Louis Truscott	200 cm	106 kg	Forward
42	(United States)	Frank Edward Russell	211 cm	108 kg	Center

== Pre-season ==
Bc Mures played 4 games with Romanian teams and participated at an international friendly Cup in Hungary "Gocsej Cup". For details click the main article above.

- Bc Mures – CSU Sibiu 79-90 photo gallery
- Bc Mures – Gaz Metan Medias 76-80
- Bc Mures – Romanian National Team 80-79 photo gallery
- Bc Mures – CSU Brasov 69-81

Gocsej Cup, (Hungary) Zalaegerszeg sept. 20-23

- (Hungary) Zalaegerszeg KK – Bc Mures 95–67
- (Hungary) Dombovar KC – Bc Mures 102–90
- (Hungary) Falco KC Szombathely – Bc Mures 110–102
- (Hungary) MAFC Újbuda – Bc Mures 71–75

== 2007–2008 Romanian Cup ==
- Bc Mures – Rapid Bucuresti (1st leg) 74-69 photo gallery
- Rapid Bucuresti – Bc Mures (2nd leg) 84-64 (eliminated)

== 2007–2008 regular season ==
- Leonardo Oradea – Bc Mures 87-90 (OT) game summary (RO) box score photos
- Bc Mures – Elba Timisoara 79-78 game summary (RO) box score photos
- U-Mobitelco Cluj – Bc Mures 106-92 game summary (RO) box score
- Gaz Metan Medias – Bc Mures 101-85 game summary (RO) box score
- Bc Mures – Bc Targoviste 85-76 game summary (RO) box score photos
- CSU Cuadripol Brasov – Bc Mures 85-90 game summary (RO) box score
- Bc Mures – Dinamo Bucuresti 100-108
- CS Otopeni – Bc Mures 97-91
- Bc Mures – CSU Asesoft Ploiesti 77-81
- Bc Mures – BC Ramnicu Valcea 97-84
- Bc Mures – BCM Arges Pitesti 113-104 (OT)
- Bc Mures – Rapid Bucuresti 91-73
- CSU Atlassib Sibiu – Bc Mures 84-73

2nd half-season

- Bc Mures – Leonardo Oradea 90-73 (McKenna 20pts, 9reb; Truscott 18pts, 10reb; Cooley 12pts, 12as)
- Elba Timișoara – Bc Mures 72-71 (Truscott 18pts, 10reb; Mckenna 16pts, 12reb; McCullough 15pts)
- Bc Mures – U-Mobitelco Cluj 78-76 (Truscott 23pts, 9reb; McCullogh 21pts; Cooley 9pts, 5as)
- Bc Mures – Gaz Metan Medias 105-94 (McCullogh 35pts; Cooley 22pts, 10as, 5steals; Truscott 21pts, McKenna 15pts, 11reb)
- Bc Targoviste – Bc Mures 79-92
- Bc Mures – CSU Cuadripol Brasov 127-79
- CS Dinamo – Gealan București – BC Mureş Târgu Mureş 88–82
- Bc Mures – CS Otopeni 93–85
- CSU Asesoft Ploiesti – Bc Mures 96–69
- BCM Arges Pitesti – Bc Mures 96–83
- BC Ramnicu Valcea – Bc Mures 97–100
- Rapid Bucuresti – Bc Mures 101–83
- Bc Mures – CSU Atlassib Sibiu 79–75

Playoffs First Round:

- CSU Asesoft Ploiesti – Bc Mures 88–80
- Bc Mures- CSU Asesoft Ploiesti 78–85

== Standings after the regular season ==
- (as of 17 Feb. 2008)

Pos.	Team	W–L	Pm – Pr	Pts
1.	CSU Asesoft Ploiesti	24–2	2273–1885	50
2.	CSU Atlassib Sibiu	20–6	2257–2049	46
3.	U-Mobitelco Cluj	19–7	2250–1981	45
4.	Rapid Bucuresti	16–10	2168–2065	42
5.	Elba Timișoara	16–10	2154–2041	42
6.	Gaz Metan Medias	15–11	2193–2124	41
7.	Dinamo Bucuresti	15–11	2213–2076	41
8.	Bc Mures	15–11	2315–2751	41
9.	BCM Arges Pitesti	12–14	2149–2224	38
10.	CS Otopeni	9–17	2214–2229	35
11.	BC Ramnicu Valcea	6–20	1944–2158	32
12.	CSU Cuadripol Brasov	6–20	1959–2275	32
13.	Gresiloft Targoviste	5–21	1886–2267	31
14.	Leonardo Oradea	4–22	1905–2231	30
