= 2016–17 Liga Națională (men's basketball) =

Romanian men's basketball tournament

Liga Națională
- Season: 2016–17
- Teams: 11

Regular season
- Relegated: Olimpic Baia Mare

Finals
- Champions: U-Banca Transilvania; 5th title
- Runners-up: Steaua CSM Eximbank
- Third place: CSM U Oradea
- Fourth place: CSU Sibiu
- Finals MVP: Ousmane Barro (Cluj-Napoca)

The 2016–17 Liga Națională season was the 67th season of the Liga Națională, the highest professional basketball league in Romania. CSM U Oradea was the defending champion.

== Competition format ==
The Romanian Basketball Federation agreed a change in the competition format for the 2016–17 season:

- 11 teams played the regular season, consisting in a double-legged round robin format.
- At the end of the regular season, teams are split into two groups, one of them composed by the first six teams and the other one by the rest. In this second stage all points of the regular season are counted and the teams will face each other from its group twice.
- All teams from the group from 1st to 6th and the two first qualified teams from the bottom group will join the playoffs. In this knockout stage, quarterfinals and semifinals will be played with a best-of-three-games format and the final with a best-of-five one.

== Teams ==
Olimpic Baia Mare and Ploiești were promoted from the previous season of the Liga I, but only Olimpic joined the league.

Location of teams in 2016–17 Liga Națională

Team	City	Arena	Capacity
BC Mureș	Târgu Mureș	Sala Sporturilor	2,000
BC Timișoara	Timișoara	Constantin Jude	2,200
BCM U Pitești	Pitești	Trivale	2,000
CSM U Oradea	Oradea	Arena Antonio Alexe	2,000
CSU Sibiu	Sibiu	Transilvania	3,000
Dinamo București	București	Dinamo	2,538
Olimpic Baia Mare	Baia Mare	Lascăr Pană	2,048
Phoenix Galați	Galați	Dunărea	1,500
SCM U Craiova	Craiova	Polyvalent Hall	4,215
Steaua CSM Eximbank	București	Mihai Viteazu	2,000
Steaua CSM Eximbank	București	Polyvalent Hall	3,500
U-BT Cluj	Cluj Napoca	Polyvalent Hall	7,308
U-BT Cluj	Cluj Napoca	Horia Demian	2,525

== Regular season ==
Pos	Team	Pld	W	L	PF	PA	PD	Pts	Qualification
1	U-Banca Transilvania	28	24	4	2407	2129	+278	52	Qualification to Play-offs
2	CSU Sibiu	28	18	10	2185	2094	+91	46	Qualification to Play-offs
3	Steaua CSM Eximbank	28	17	11	2261	2142	+119	45	Qualification to Play-offs
4	CSM U Oradea	28	15	13	2159	2105	+54	43	Qualification to Play-offs
5	BC Timișoara	28	13	15	2216	2272	−56	41	Qualification to Play-offs
6	BCM U Pitești	28	11	17	2157	2271	−114	39	Qualification to Play-offs
7	BC Mureș	24	12	12	1934	1923	+11	36	Qualification to Play-offs
8	SCM U Craiova	24	8	16	1887	1946	−59	32	Qualification to Play-offs
9	Phoenix Galați	24	8	16	1877	2023	−146	32	
10	Dinamo București	24	6	18	1807	1985	−178	30	
11	Olimpic Baia Mare (W)	0	0	0	0	0	0	0	Withdrew

Source: Romanian Basketball Federation
(W) ?

== Play-offs ==
Quarter-finals
1 U-Banca Transilvania	100	104	107
8 SCM U Craiova	74	78	71
4 CSM U Oradea	74	85	86
5 Timișoara	66	81	84
2 CSU Sibiu	76	54	89	62	82
7 BC Mureș	66	75	87	70	68
3 Steaua CSM Eximbank	84	105	89
6 BCM U Pitești	61	90	72

Semi-finals
1 U-Banca Transilvania	86	103	59	76	84
4 CSM U Oradea	73	96	69	85	78
2 CSU Sibiu	79	88	79	63
3 Steaua CSM Eximbank	84	80	81	81

Final
1 U-Banca Transilvania	87	84	75
3 Steaua CSM Eximbank	85	80	61

Third place
4 CSM U Oradea	63	70	72
2 CSU Sibiu	69	66	71
