= Dejan Djokić =

Dejan Djokić may refer to:

- Dejan Djokić (historian), Serbian historian
- Dejan Djokic (footballer) (born 2000), Swiss footballer
- Dejan Đokić (basketball) (born 1989), Serbian basketball player
