= Water polo at the 2013 Summer Universiade – Men's tournament =

Men's water polo at the XXVII Summer Universiade
- Venue: various
- Dates: July 5, 2013 – July 17, 2013

Medalists
1st place, gold medalist(s)		Hungary (HUN)
2nd place, silver medalist(s)		Russia (RUS)
3rd place, bronze medalist(s)		Serbia (SRB)

The men's tournament of water polo at the 2013 Summer Universiade was held from July 5 to 17 in Kazan, Russia.

== Preliminary round ==
=== Group A ===
Team	GP	W	D	L	GF	GA	GD	Pts
Russia	5	5	0	0	78	33	+45	10
Hungary	5	4	0	1	71	34	+37	8
Japan	5	3	0	2	91	47	+44	6
Australia	5	2	0	3	58	44	+14	4
Canada	5	1	0	4	28	91	–63	2
Georgia	5	0	0	5	24	101	–77	0

5 July 2013; 14:00	Report	Japan	10–7	Australia	Burevestnik Swimming Pool; Referees: Dhossche (BEL), Peila (USA)
5 July 2013; 14:00	Report	Score by quarters: 2–3, 1–1, 1–1, 6–2			Burevestnik Swimming Pool; Referees: Dhossche (BEL), Peila (USA)
5 July 2013; 14:00	Report	Takei 5	Goals	Trabinger 2	Burevestnik Swimming Pool; Referees: Dhossche (BEL), Peila (USA)

5 July 2013; 17:00	Report	Hungary	20–3	Georgia	Burevestnik Swimming Pool; Referees: Rakovic-Krstonosic (SRB), Bianco (ITA)
5 July 2013; 17:00	Report	Score by quarters: 6–0, 4–1, 7–0, 3–2			Burevestnik Swimming Pool; Referees: Rakovic-Krstonosic (SRB), Bianco (ITA)
5 July 2013; 17:00	Report	Tóth 5	Goals	Kavlashvili 2	Burevestnik Swimming Pool; Referees: Rakovic-Krstonosic (SRB), Bianco (ITA)

5 July 2013; 20:00	Report	Russia	23–4	Canada	Burevestnik Swimming Pool; Referees: Riccitelli (ITA), Franulovic (CRO)
5 July 2013; 20:00	Report	Score by quarters: 5–2, 8–0, 5–2, 5–2			Burevestnik Swimming Pool; Referees: Riccitelli (ITA), Franulovic (CRO)
5 July 2013; 20:00	Report	Risov-Alenichev, Nagaev 5	Goals	Thumwood 2	Burevestnik Swimming Pool; Referees: Riccitelli (ITA), Franulovic (CRO)

7 July 2013; 17:00	Report	Canada	8–25	Japan	Burevestnik Swimming Pool; Referees: David (FRA), Rakovic-Krstonosic (SRB)
7 July 2013; 17:00	Report	Score by quarters: 0–6, 2–4, 5–7, 1–8			Burevestnik Swimming Pool; Referees: David (FRA), Rakovic-Krstonosic (SRB)
7 July 2013; 17:00	Report	three players 2	Goals	Takei 6	Burevestnik Swimming Pool; Referees: David (FRA), Rakovic-Krstonosic (SRB)

7 July 2013; 18:30	Report	Australia	15–3	Georgia	Burevestnik Swimming Pool; Referees: Rodrigues (BRA), Matijasevic (MNE)
7 July 2013; 18:30	Report	Score by quarters: 1–1, 7–2, 2–0, 5–0			Burevestnik Swimming Pool; Referees: Rodrigues (BRA), Matijasevic (MNE)
7 July 2013; 18:30	Report	Sindone 5	Goals	Giorgadze 2	Burevestnik Swimming Pool; Referees: Rodrigues (BRA), Matijasevic (MNE)

7 July 2013; 20:00	Report	Russia	9–8	Hungary	Burevestnik Swimming Pool; Referees: Stavropoulos (GRE), Bianco (ITA)
7 July 2013; 20:00	Report	Score by quarters: 3–2, 3–2, 1–2, 2–2			Burevestnik Swimming Pool; Referees: Stavropoulos (GRE), Bianco (ITA)
7 July 2013; 20:00	Report	Ashaev 3	Goals	Korenyi, Kovács 2	Burevestnik Swimming Pool; Referees: Stavropoulos (GRE), Bianco (ITA)

8 July 2013; 12:30	Report	Canada	10–9	Georgia	Burevestnik Swimming Pool; Referees: Rodrigues (BRA), Bianco (ITA)
8 July 2013; 12:30	Report	Score by quarters: 3–1, 4–3, 3–4, 0–1			Burevestnik Swimming Pool; Referees: Rodrigues (BRA), Bianco (ITA)
8 July 2013; 12:30	Report	Pelland, Lapins 3	Goals	Kartvelishvili 3	Burevestnik Swimming Pool; Referees: Rodrigues (BRA), Bianco (ITA)

8 July 2013; 18:30	Report	Hungary	16–9	Australia	Burevestnik Swimming Pool; Referees: David (FRA), Matijasevic (MNE)
8 July 2013; 18:30	Report	Score by quarters: 4–2, 3–1, 4–1, 5–5			Burevestnik Swimming Pool; Referees: David (FRA), Matijasevic (MNE)
8 July 2013; 18:30	Report	Tóth 5	Goals	Sindone, Trabinger 2	Burevestnik Swimming Pool; Referees: David (FRA), Matijasevic (MNE)

8 July 2013; 20:00	Report	Russia	13–11	Japan	Burevestnik Swimming Pool; Referees: Stavropoulos (GRE), Peila (USA)
8 July 2013; 20:00	Report	Score by quarters: 4–3, 2–2, 5–1, 2–5			Burevestnik Swimming Pool; Referees: Stavropoulos (GRE), Peila (USA)
8 July 2013; 20:00	Report	Ashaev, Latypov 3	Goals	Takei 5	Burevestnik Swimming Pool; Referees: Stavropoulos (GRE), Peila (USA)

10 July 2013; 14:00	Report	Japan	35–6	Georgia	Burevestnik Swimming Pool; Referees: Matijasevic (MNE), David (FRA)
10 July 2013; 14:00	Report	Score by quarters: 10–1, 9–1, 6–3, 10–1			Burevestnik Swimming Pool; Referees: Matijasevic (MNE), David (FRA)
10 July 2013; 14:00	Report	Takei 7	Goals	Giorgadze 2	Burevestnik Swimming Pool; Referees: Matijasevic (MNE), David (FRA)

10 July 2013; 17:00	Report	Canada	3–14	Hungary	Burevestnik Swimming Pool; Referees: Dhossche (BEL), Stavropoulos (GRE)
10 July 2013; 17:00	Report	Score by quarters: 0–2, 1–4, 1–3, 1–5			Burevestnik Swimming Pool; Referees: Dhossche (BEL), Stavropoulos (GRE)
10 July 2013; 17:00	Report	three players 3	Goals	Halek 4	Burevestnik Swimming Pool; Referees: Dhossche (BEL), Stavropoulos (GRE)

10 July 2013; 20:00	Report	Russia	12–7	Australia	Burevestnik Swimming Pool; Referees: Bianco (ITA), Franulovic (CRO)
10 July 2013; 20:00	Report	Score by quarters: 1–2, 2–3, 4–2, 5–0			Burevestnik Swimming Pool; Referees: Bianco (ITA), Franulovic (CRO)
10 July 2013; 20:00	Report	Lisunov 3	Goals	Sindone, Trabinger 2	Burevestnik Swimming Pool; Referees: Bianco (ITA), Franulovic (CRO)

11 July 2013; 17:00	Report	Australia	20–3	Canada	Burevestnik Swimming Pool; Referees: David (FRA), Peila (USA)
11 July 2013; 17:00	Report	Score by quarters: 4–0, 5–3, 2–0, 9–0			Burevestnik Swimming Pool; Referees: David (FRA), Peila (USA)
11 July 2013; 17:00	Report	four players 3	Goals	Thumwood 2	Burevestnik Swimming Pool; Referees: David (FRA), Peila (USA)

11 July 2013; 18:30	Report	Japan	10–13	Hungary	Burevestnik Swimming Pool; Referees: Franulovic (CRO), Riccitelli (ITA)
11 July 2013; 18:30	Report	Score by quarters: 2–1, 1–4, 5–6, 2–2			Burevestnik Swimming Pool; Referees: Franulovic (CRO), Riccitelli (ITA)
11 July 2013; 18:30	Report	Takei 6	Goals	Tóth 4	Burevestnik Swimming Pool; Referees: Franulovic (CRO), Riccitelli (ITA)

11 July 2013; 20:00	Report	Russia	21–3	Georgia	Burevestnik Swimming Pool; Referees: Dhossche (BEL), Rakovic-Krstonosic (SRB)
11 July 2013; 20:00	Report	Score by quarters: 6–1, 4–0, 5–2, 6–0			Burevestnik Swimming Pool; Referees: Dhossche (BEL), Rakovic-Krstonosic (SRB)
11 July 2013; 20:00	Report	Latypov 5	Goals	Giorgadze 2	Burevestnik Swimming Pool; Referees: Dhossche (BEL), Rakovic-Krstonosic (SRB)

=== Group B ===
Team	GP	W	D	L	GF	GA	GD	Pts
Italy	5	4	0	1	63	37	+26	8
Serbia	5	4	0	1	61	28	+33	8
United States	5	2	1	2	47	34	+13	5
Brazil	5	2	1	2	52	42	+10	5
Montenegro	5	2	0	3	56	39	+17	4
Belgium	5	0	0	5	13	112	–99	0

5 July 2013; 12:30	Report	United States	8–8	Brazil	Burevestnik Swimming Pool; Referees: David (FRA), Tahara (JPN)
5 July 2013; 12:30	Report	Score by quarters: 2–2, 3–3, 1–1, 2–2			Burevestnik Swimming Pool; Referees: David (FRA), Tahara (JPN)
5 July 2013; 12:30	Report	P. Reynolds 2	Goals	Baches Delgado 3	Burevestnik Swimming Pool; Referees: David (FRA), Tahara (JPN)

5 July 2013; 15:30	Report	Serbia	9–5	Montenegro	Burevestnik Swimming Pool; Referees: Stavropoulos (GRE), Gerzanich (RUS)
5 July 2013; 15:30	Report	Score by quarters: 2–1, 3–1, 2–1, 2–2			Burevestnik Swimming Pool; Referees: Stavropoulos (GRE), Gerzanich (RUS)
5 July 2013; 15:30	Report	Vuksanović 3	Goals	Murišić 2	Burevestnik Swimming Pool; Referees: Stavropoulos (GRE), Gerzanich (RUS)

5 July 2013; 18:30	Report	Italy	28–1	Belgium	Burevestnik Swimming Pool; Referees: Carney (AUS), Murray (CAN)
5 July 2013; 18:30	Report	Score by quarters: 4–0, 4–1, 11–0, 9–0			Burevestnik Swimming Pool; Referees: Carney (AUS), Murray (CAN)
5 July 2013; 18:30	Report	Damonte, Luongo 5	Goals	Poelmans 1	Burevestnik Swimming Pool; Referees: Carney (AUS), Murray (CAN)

7 July 2013; 12:30	Report	Serbia	7–8	Italy	Burevestnik Swimming Pool; Referees: Boros-Djevi (AUS), Szekely (HUN)
7 July 2013; 12:30	Report	Score by quarters: 0–1, 1–2, 4–2, 2–3			Burevestnik Swimming Pool; Referees: Boros-Djevi (AUS), Szekely (HUN)
7 July 2013; 12:30	Report	Rašović 3	Goals	Luongo, Coppoli 2	Burevestnik Swimming Pool; Referees: Boros-Djevi (AUS), Szekely (HUN)

7 July 2013; 14:00	Report	Brazil	19–3	Belgium	Burevestnik Swimming Pool; Referees: Shimizu (JPN), Gerzanich (RUS)
7 July 2013; 14:00	Report	Score by quarters: 4–1, 3–0, 5–1, 7–1			Burevestnik Swimming Pool; Referees: Shimizu (JPN), Gerzanich (RUS)
7 July 2013; 14:00	Report	Guimarães 5	Goals	Poelmans 2	Burevestnik Swimming Pool; Referees: Shimizu (JPN), Gerzanich (RUS)

7 July 2013; 15:30	Report	Montenegro	8–9	United States	Burevestnik Swimming Pool; Referees: Franulović (CRO), Mebuke (GEO)
7 July 2013; 15:30	Report	Score by quarters: 1–2, 0–3, 1–1, 6–3			Burevestnik Swimming Pool; Referees: Franulović (CRO), Mebuke (GEO)
7 July 2013; 15:30	Report	Šarić 3	Goals	P. Reynolds 3	Burevestnik Swimming Pool; Referees: Franulović (CRO), Mebuke (GEO)

8 July 2013; 14:00	Report	Serbia	9–5	United States	Burevestnik Swimming Pool; Referees: Szekely (HUN), Shimizu (JPN)
8 July 2013; 14:00	Report	Score by quarters: 1–1, 2–1, 1–1, 5–2			Burevestnik Swimming Pool; Referees: Szekely (HUN), Shimizu (JPN)
8 July 2013; 14:00	Report	four players 2	Goals	five players 1	Burevestnik Swimming Pool; Referees: Szekely (HUN), Shimizu (JPN)

8 July 2013; 15:30	Report	Italy	11–10	Brazil	Burevestnik Swimming Pool; Referees: Franulović (CRO), Gerzanich (RUS)
8 July 2013; 15:30	Report	Score by quarters: 4–1, 1–1, 3–4, 3–4			Burevestnik Swimming Pool; Referees: Franulović (CRO), Gerzanich (RUS)
8 July 2013; 15:30	Report	Luongo 4	Goals	Baches Delgado 4	Burevestnik Swimming Pool; Referees: Franulović (CRO), Gerzanich (RUS)

8 July 2013; 17:00	Report	Belgium	5–24	Montenegro	Burevestnik Swimming Pool; Referees: Boros-Djevi (AUS), Deslieres (CAN)
8 July 2013; 17:00	Report	Score by quarters: 1–6, 1–7, 2–4, 1–7			Burevestnik Swimming Pool; Referees: Boros-Djevi (AUS), Deslieres (CAN)
8 July 2013; 17:00	Report	five players 1	Goals	Šarić 4	Burevestnik Swimming Pool; Referees: Boros-Djevi (AUS), Deslieres (CAN)

10 July 2013; 12:30	Report	Serbia	14–8	Brazil	Burevestnik Swimming Pool; Referees: Tahara (JPN), Deslieres (CAN)
10 July 2013; 12:30	Report	Score by quarters: 3–2, 5–2, 2–2, 4–2			Burevestnik Swimming Pool; Referees: Tahara (JPN), Deslieres (CAN)
10 July 2013; 12:30	Report	Rackov, Vuksanović 3	Goals	Baches Delgado 2	Burevestnik Swimming Pool; Referees: Tahara (JPN), Deslieres (CAN)

10 July 2013; 15:30	Report	United States	19–2	Belgium	Burevestnik Swimming Pool; Referees: Murray (CAN), Szekely (HUN)
10 July 2013; 15:30	Report	Score by quarters: 6–1, 5–0, 3–1, 5–0			Burevestnik Swimming Pool; Referees: Murray (CAN), Szekely (HUN)
10 July 2013; 15:30	Report	L. Reynolds 5	Goals	two players 2	Burevestnik Swimming Pool; Referees: Murray (CAN), Szekely (HUN)

10 July 2013; 18:30	Report	Montenegro	13–9	Italy	Burevestnik Swimming Pool; Referees: Carney (AUS), Vasenin (RUS)
10 July 2013; 18:30	Report	Score by quarters: 2–2, 3–4, 5–1, 3–2			Burevestnik Swimming Pool; Referees: Carney (AUS), Vasenin (RUS)
10 July 2013; 18:30	Report	Popović, Murišić 3	Goals	Gitto 3	Burevestnik Swimming Pool; Referees: Carney (AUS), Vasenin (RUS)

11 July 2013; 12:30	Report	Serbia	22–2	Belgium	Burevestnik Swimming Pool; Referees: Deslieres (CAN), Tahara (JPN)
11 July 2013; 12:30	Report	Score by quarters: 6–0, 5–1, 4–1, 7–0			Burevestnik Swimming Pool; Referees: Deslieres (CAN), Tahara (JPN)
11 July 2013; 12:30	Report	Rackov 6	Goals	Verschuren 2	Burevestnik Swimming Pool; Referees: Deslieres (CAN), Tahara (JPN)

11 July 2013; 14:00	Report	Brazil	7–6	Montenegro	Burevestnik Swimming Pool; Referees: Mebuke (GEO), Szekely (HUN)
11 July 2013; 14:00	Report	Score by quarters: 2–2, 3–2, 1–2, 1–0			Burevestnik Swimming Pool; Referees: Mebuke (GEO), Szekely (HUN)
11 July 2013; 14:00	Report	Baches Delgado 4	Goals	Šarić 3	Burevestnik Swimming Pool; Referees: Mebuke (GEO), Szekely (HUN)

11 July 2013; 15:30	Report	United States	6–7	Italy	Burevestnik Swimming Pool; Referees: Boros-Djevi (AUS), Gerzanich (RUS)
11 July 2013; 15:30	Report	Score by quarters: 1–2, 1–3, 2–2, 2–0			Burevestnik Swimming Pool; Referees: Boros-Djevi (AUS), Gerzanich (RUS)
11 July 2013; 15:30	Report	Lenhardt 2	Goals	Luongo 3	Burevestnik Swimming Pool; Referees: Boros-Djevi (AUS), Gerzanich (RUS)

== Consolation round ==
=== 9th–12th place ===
Team	GP	W	D	L	GF	GA	GD	Pts
Montenegro	3	3	0	0	50	10	+40	6
Canada	3	2	0	1	28	30	–2	4
Georgia	3	1	0	2	18	32	–14	2
Belgium	3	0	0	3	22	46	–24	0

13 July 2013; 12:30	Report	Georgia	7–5	Belgium	Burevestnik Swimming Pool; Referees: Birri (HUN), Shimizu (JPN)
13 July 2013; 12:30	Report	Score by quarters: 2–0, 3–2, 2–3, 0–0			Burevestnik Swimming Pool; Referees: Birri (HUN), Shimizu (JPN)
13 July 2013; 12:30	Report	Chikvinidze 4	Goals	five players 1	Burevestnik Swimming Pool; Referees: Birri (HUN), Shimizu (JPN)

13 July 2013; 14:00	Report	Canada	3–9	Montenegro	Burevestnik Swimming Pool; Referees: Tahara (JPN), Vasenin (RUS)
13 July 2013; 14:00	Report	Score by quarters: 2–3, 0–2, 0–2, 1–2			Burevestnik Swimming Pool; Referees: Tahara (JPN), Vasenin (RUS)
13 July 2013; 14:00	Report	three players 1	Goals	Saric 3	Burevestnik Swimming Pool; Referees: Tahara (JPN), Vasenin (RUS)

15 July 2013; 12:30	Report	Belgium	12–15	Canada	Burevestnik Swimming Pool; Referees: Rodrigues (BRA), Tahara (JPN)
15 July 2013; 12:30	Report	Score by quarters: 1–4, 2–3, 3–3, 6–5			Burevestnik Swimming Pool; Referees: Rodrigues (BRA), Tahara (JPN)
15 July 2013; 12:30	Report	Poelmans, Verschuren 4	Goals	Pelland, Lapins 3	Burevestnik Swimming Pool; Referees: Rodrigues (BRA), Tahara (JPN)

15 July 2013; 14:00	Report	Montenegro	17–2	Georgia	Burevestnik Swimming Pool; Referees: Boros-Djevi (AUS), Deslieres (CAN)
15 July 2013; 14:00	Report	Score by quarters: 5–1, 3–0, 5–1, 4–0			Burevestnik Swimming Pool; Referees: Boros-Djevi (AUS), Deslieres (CAN)
15 July 2013; 14:00	Report	Latinovic, Murisic 3	Goals	Chikvinidze, Kavlashvili 1	Burevestnik Swimming Pool; Referees: Boros-Djevi (AUS), Deslieres (CAN)

== Classification rounds ==
=== 5th–8th place ===
15 July 2013; 15:30	Report	Australia	8–11	United States	Burevestnik Swimming Pool; Referees: Bianco (ITA), Vasenin (RUS)
15 July 2013; 15:30	Report	Score by quarters: 0–2, 2–3, 2–3, 4–3			Burevestnik Swimming Pool; Referees: Bianco (ITA), Vasenin (RUS)
15 July 2013; 15:30	Report	Sindone, Edwards 2	Goals	P. Reynolds 4	Burevestnik Swimming Pool; Referees: Bianco (ITA), Vasenin (RUS)

15 July 2013; 17:00	Report	Japan	12–9	Brazil	Burevestnik Swimming Pool; Referees: Szekely (HUN), Riccitelli (ITA)
15 July 2013; 17:00	Report	Score by quarters: 2–3, 4–1, 4–3, 2–2			Burevestnik Swimming Pool; Referees: Szekely (HUN), Riccitelli (ITA)
15 July 2013; 17:00	Report	Kadono 4	Goals	three players 2	Burevestnik Swimming Pool; Referees: Szekely (HUN), Riccitelli (ITA)

=== 7th-place game ===
16 July 2013; 11:00	Report	Australia	8–7	Brazil	Burevestnik Swimming Pool; Referees: Bianco (ITA), Gerzanich (RUS)
16 July 2013; 11:00	Report	Score by quarters: 4–1, 2–2, 0–2, 2–2			Burevestnik Swimming Pool; Referees: Bianco (ITA), Gerzanich (RUS)
16 July 2013; 11:00	Report	Edwards 4	Goals	Coutinho, Baches Delgado 2	Burevestnik Swimming Pool; Referees: Bianco (ITA), Gerzanich (RUS)

=== 5th-place game ===
16 July 2013; 12:30	Report	United States	8–7	Japan	Burevestnik Swimming Pool; Referees: Carney (AUS), Dhossche (BEL)
16 July 2013; 12:30	Report	Score by quarters: 2–1, 2–1, 2–2, 2–3			Burevestnik Swimming Pool; Referees: Carney (AUS), Dhossche (BEL)
16 July 2013; 12:30	Report	three players 2	Goals	Takei 4	Burevestnik Swimming Pool; Referees: Carney (AUS), Dhossche (BEL)

== Final round ==
Quarterfinals
B1	Italy	8
A4	Australia	5
A2	Hungary	12
B3	United States	7
B2	Serbia	15
A3	Japan	7
A1	Russia	14
B4	Brazil	5

Semifinals
B1	Italy	9
A2	Hungary	11
B2	Serbia	11
A1	Russia	12

Gold Medal Game
A2	Hungary	5
A1	Russia	4
Bronze Medal Game
B1	Italy	10
B2	Serbia	12

=== Quarterfinals ===
13 July 2013; 15:30	Report	Serbia	15–7	Japan	Burevestnik Swimming Pool; Referees: Mebuke (GEO), Stavropoulos (GRE)
13 July 2013; 15:30	Report	Score by quarters: 2–3, 3–1, 5–2, 5–1			Burevestnik Swimming Pool; Referees: Mebuke (GEO), Stavropoulos (GRE)
13 July 2013; 15:30	Report	Dedović, Vapenski 3	Goals	Takei 5	Burevestnik Swimming Pool; Referees: Mebuke (GEO), Stavropoulos (GRE)

13 July 2013; 17:00	Report	Hungary	12–7	United States	Burevestnik Swimming Pool; Referees: Franulovic (CRO), Carney (AUS)
13 July 2013; 17:00	Report	Score by quarters: 3–2, 3–2, 4–1, 2–2			Burevestnik Swimming Pool; Referees: Franulovic (CRO), Carney (AUS)
13 July 2013; 17:00	Report	three players 2	Goals	P. Reynolds, McClintick 2	Burevestnik Swimming Pool; Referees: Franulovic (CRO), Carney (AUS)

13 July 2013; 18:30	Report	Russia	14–5	Brazil	Burevestnik Swimming Pool; Referees: Szekely (HUN), Riccitelli (ITA)
13 July 2013; 18:30	Report	Score by quarters: 5–2, 3–0, 1–2, 5–1			Burevestnik Swimming Pool; Referees: Szekely (HUN), Riccitelli (ITA)
13 July 2013; 18:30	Report	Latypov, Andrukov 3	Goals	Correa 2	Burevestnik Swimming Pool; Referees: Szekely (HUN), Riccitelli (ITA)

13 July 2013; 20:00	Report	Italy	8–5	Australia	Burevestnik Swimming Pool; Referees: Murray (CAN), Matijasevic (MNE)
13 July 2013; 20:00	Report	Score by quarters: 3–1, 2–1, 2–2, 1–1			Burevestnik Swimming Pool; Referees: Murray (CAN), Matijasevic (MNE)
13 July 2013; 20:00	Report	Damonte, Marziali 4	Goals	Dyson, Trabinger 2	Burevestnik Swimming Pool; Referees: Murray (CAN), Matijasevic (MNE)

=== Semifinals ===
15 July 2013; 18:30	Report	Italy	9–11	Hungary	Burevestnik Swimming Pool; Referees: Franulovic (CRO), David (FRA)
15 July 2013; 18:30	Report	Score by quarters: 2–3, 1–3, 2–3, 4–2			Burevestnik Swimming Pool; Referees: Franulovic (CRO), David (FRA)
15 July 2013; 18:30	Report	Damonte 4	Goals	Somogyi 4	Burevestnik Swimming Pool; Referees: Franulovic (CRO), David (FRA)

15 July 2013; 20:00	Report	Serbia	11–12	Russia	Burevestnik Swimming Pool; Referees: Stavropoulos (GRE), Peila (USA)
15 July 2013; 20:00	Report	Score by quarters: 5–3, 1–6, 2–2, 3–1			Burevestnik Swimming Pool; Referees: Stavropoulos (GRE), Peila (USA)
15 July 2013; 20:00	Report	Dedovic 5	Goals	Risov-Alenichev 5	Burevestnik Swimming Pool; Referees: Stavropoulos (GRE), Peila (USA)

=== Bronze-medal match ===
17 July 2013; 11:15	Report	Italy	10–12	Serbia	Burevestnik Swimming Pool; Referees: Szekely (HUN), Franulović (CRO)
17 July 2013; 11:15	Report	Score by quarters: 1–5, 4–2, 3–2, 2–3			Burevestnik Swimming Pool; Referees: Szekely (HUN), Franulović (CRO)
17 July 2013; 11:15	Report	di Somma, Luongo 3	Goals	Vuksanović 5	Burevestnik Swimming Pool; Referees: Szekely (HUN), Franulović (CRO)

=== Gold-medal match ===
17 July 2013; 13:00	Report	Hungary	5–4	Russia	Burevestnik Swimming Pool; Referees: Riccitelli (ITA), Stavropoulos (GRE)
17 July 2013; 13:00	Report	Score by quarters: 1–1, 1–1, 3–1, 0–1			Burevestnik Swimming Pool; Referees: Riccitelli (ITA), Stavropoulos (GRE)
17 July 2013; 13:00	Report	five players 1	Goals	Zinnatullin 2	Burevestnik Swimming Pool; Referees: Riccitelli (ITA), Stavropoulos (GRE)

== Final standings ==
Place	Team	Score
1st place, gold medalist(s)	Hungary	7–0–1
2nd place, silver medalist(s)	Russia	7–0–1
3rd place, bronze medalist(s)	Serbia	6–0–2
4	Italy	5–0–3
5	United States	4–1–3
6	Japan	4–0–4
7	Australia	3–0–5
8	Brazil	2–1–5
9	Montenegro	4–0–3
10	Canada	2–0–5
11	Georgia	1–0–6
12	Belgium	0–0–7
