= Adrian Movileanu =

Romanian basketball player

No. 55 – BCM Olimpic Baia Mare
- Position: Small forward
- League: Liga Națională

Personal information
- Born: September 4, 1993 (age 33) Ploiești, Romania
- Listed height: 6 ft 5 in (1.96 m)
- Listed weight: 195 lb (88 kg)

Career information
- College: Alexandru Ioan Cuza High-School, Ploiești
- Playing career: 2011–present

Career history
- 2011–2016: CSU Asesoft Ploiești
- 2016: BCM Olimpic Baia Mare
- 2016–2018: Cuza Sport Braila
- 2018–2021: VSK Miercurea Ciuc

Adrian Movileanu (born September 4, 1993) is a Romanian professional basketball player for BCM Olimpic Baia Mare of the Romanian League.
