= Ousmane Barro =

Senegalese basketball player (born 1984)

Free Agent
- Position: Center / power forward

Personal information
- Born: December 7, 1984 (age 41) Dakar, Senegal
- Listed height: 6 ft 10 in (2.08 m)
- Listed weight: 235 lb (107 kg)

Career information
- High school: Julian (Chicago, Illinois)
- College: Marquette (2004–2008)
- NBA draft: 2008: undrafted
- Playing career: 2008–present

Career history
- 2008–2009: Górnik Wałbrzych
- 2009–2010: Szolnoki Olaj
- 2010–2011: Zob Ahan Isfahan
- 2011–2012: JL Bourg
- 2012: Orléans Loiret
- 2012: Link Tochigi Brex
- 2013: Mureș
- 2013–2014: Piteşti
- 2014–2016: Mureș
- 2016–2018: U-BT Cluj-Napoca
- 2018: BC Rilski Sportist
- 2018–2020: CS Dinamo București
- 2020–2022: Voluntari
- 2022-: Brașov

Career highlights
- Romanian League champion (2017); 4× Romanian Cup winner (2017, 2018, 2021, 2022); Romanian League Finals MVP (2017)

Ousmane Barro (born 7 December 1984) is a Senegalese professional basketball player who last played for CSO Voluntari of the Liga Națională. He played college basketball for Marquette University.

== College career ==
Barro started for three seasons while at Marquette and had his best year during the 2006-2007 season when he averaged 8.1 points per game and 6.9 rebounds per game, all while shooting 54.4% from the field.

== Professional career ==
After going undrafted in the 2008 NBA draft, Barro signed with Gornik Walbrzych in Poland. He averaged 11 points and 10 rebounds per game for the team in the 2008-09 season.

For the 2009-10 season, he signed with Szolnoki Olaj in Hungary. He averaged 19.6 points and 9.8 rebounds per game, while shooting 74% from the field. His career high for Olaj came against rivals Falco KC Szombathely, where he scored 45 points, grabbed ten rebounds, and also had four steals, one block, and an assist.

The following season, 2010–11, Barro played in Iran for Zob Ahan Isfahan BC. He averaged a double double, and helped his team reach the finals, where they eventually lost to Marhan in game 5.

In 2011-12, he signed with French team JL Bourg Basket, and averaged 15 points, with 8.5 rebounds per game for the year.

Barro's 2012-13 team was BC Mureș in Romania, where he averaged 24 minutes per game, with 9 points, 7 rebounds, and 1 block. He helped Mureș take the first place during the regular season, and reach the finals for the first time in the club's history, where they lost to CSU Ploiești in game 6. Ploiești dissolved in 2015, and Mureș dissolved in 2018.

In 2013-14 Barro signed with BCM U Pitești for the upcoming season. He averaged 11 points and 8 rebounds per game.

He returned to BC Mureș for the 2014–15 and 2015-16 seasons, the first time where Barro didn't switch teams in consecutive summers. He averaged 11 points, 7 rebounds, and 1 block per game.

For the next two seasons, Barro played in U-BT Cluj-Napoca, winning the league in 2016-17 over Steaua Bucharest in the finals 3-0, and then losing versus Steaua in the 2017-18 semi-finals 2-3, having been 2-0 up in the tie. Barro averaged 10.5 points, and 6.5 rebounds per game.

Leaving Romania after six seasons, Barro signed with Bulgarian club BC Rilski Sportist for the 2018-19 seasons. He had a down year, averaging only 6 points and 4 rebounds per contest.

Returning to Romania to get back on track, he signed with Dinamo Bucharest for the 2019-20 season. He averaged nearly career-high numbers, his 14 points and 9 rebounds per game almost matching his numbers in Bourg, France.

In 2020, Barro signed with CSO Voluntari for the 2020-21 season. At the end of the year, he won his second Romanian title with the team, after defeating Cluj-Napoca in the finals. He extended his contract, staying for the 2021-22 campaign as well.

In 2022, he played in the Brasov basketball club, he was renewed for a new season in August 2024.

== Awards and accomplishments ==
=== Club ===
U-BT Cluj-Napoca

- Liga Națională: (2017)
- 2× Romanian Cup: (2017, 2018)

Voluntari

- 2× Romanian Cup: (2021, 2022)

=== Individual ===
- Liga Națională Finals MVP: (2017)
