= Vlad Dumitrescu =

Romanian basketball player

Vlad Florin Dumitrescu
Free agent
- Position: Shooting guard
- League: Liga Națională

Personal information
- Born: April 8, 1990 (age 36) Ploiești, Romania
- Listed height: 6 ft 3 in (1.91 m)
- Listed weight: 190 lb (86 kg)

Career information
- College: Alexandru Ioan Cuza High-School, Ploiești
- Playing career: 2010–2019

Career history
- 2010–2016: Asesoft Ploiești
- 2016–2017: BCM Olimpic Baia Mare
- 2017: CSM VSK Miercurea Ciuc
- 2017–2019: CSO Voluntari

Vlad Florin Dumitrescu (born April 8, 1990) is a former Romanian professional basketball player, he played for CSU Asesoft Ploiești, BCM Olimpic Baia Mare, CSM VSK Miercurea Ciuc and CSO Voluntari of the Romanian League.
