= Major Wingate =

American basketball player (1983–2021)

Personal information
- Born: November 10, 1983 Florence, South Carolina
- Died: October 2, 2021 (aged 37)
- Listed height: 6 ft 10 in (2.08 m)
- Listed weight: 255 lb (116 kg)

Career information
- High school: North Gwinnett (Suwanee, Georgia)
- College: Tennessee (2003–2006)
- NBA draft: 2006: undrafted
- Playing career: 2006–2010
- Position: Center

Career history
- 2006–2007: Makedonikos
- 2006–2007: Tofaş
- 2007–2008: Shanxi Zhongyu
- 2008–2009: UJAP Quimper 29
- 2008–2009: Mureș
- 2009–2010: Springfield Armor
- 2010: Caciques de Humacao

Career highlights
- CBA slam dunk leader (2008)

Major Leon-Legrant Wingate (November 10, 1983 – October 2, 2021) was an American basketball player. Wingate began playing high school basketball at Wilson High School where he averaged 15 points, 14 rebounds, 7 assists, and 4 blocks as a junior. For his senior year, he moved to North Gwinnett where he was ranked among the top 50 players in the class of 2003 and 10th-best center prospect in the nation.

After a successful high school run, he played college basketball for the Tennessee Volunteers. In 2006, Wingate was kicked off the team after violating the team's substance abuse policy; he subsequently went pro, playing in Greece still intending to enter the NBA draft. While never drafted, he did unsuccessfully try out for the Sacramento Kings. Instead, he played in Turkey, China, France, and Romania. In 2009, he was drafted by the newly formed NBA Development League team the Springfield Armor in the 2nd round.

== Early life ==
Major Wingate was born to Terri Eaddy-Wingate in Florence, SC on November 10, 1983. Wingate attended Wilson High School in Florence before transferring to North Gwinnett in Suwanee, Ga., for his senior season. He led North Gwinnett, averaging 17 points, nine rebounds, and three blocks per game, and was a 2003 McDonald's All-America finalist and a second team All-Class AAAAA selection. He was named to the All-Gwinnett first team, the GACA Region 8-AAAAA Team of the Year, and the Atlanta Tipoff Club's Team of the Year. He played in the Georgia Athletics Coaches Association North/South All-Star Game. He led North Gwinnett to a 26–4 and an appearance in the "Elite Eight" of the state tournament, after a No. 1 ranking in the state late in the season and a No. 6 final ranking. He received an invitation to attend the prestigious ABCD Camp following his eighth grade year. Named the MVP and MIP of the Adidas All-Star camp, he helped lead the Global Select team to a silver medal at the 2003 Global Games in Dallas. He was coached by Ralph Nunn at North Gwinnett and Tommy Johnson at Wilson.

== College ==
=== Freshman Year ===
Wingate was recipient of the Lowell Blanchard Award as the most improved Vol. Solid and reliable defense earned him a spot in the starting lineup in 15 of Tennessee's last 16 games. In 15 games as a starter, he tied or broke his career-high scoring mark four times. He blocked at least one shot in 10 of the last 15 games and ranked second on the team with 18 blocked shots. Had eight points and three assists against South Carolina. Scored nine points in UT's win over Auburn. Later had nine points against Alabama in the first round of the SEC Tournament. Against Kentucky, he had eight points and six rebounds in 26 minutes. Blocked a pair of shots and added five points against Texas A&M. Scored his first career points with a four-point, four rebound outing that featured three steals against Tennessee State. Saw 16 minutes of action in the season opener against Wofford, registering four rebounds and a blocked shot.

=== Sophomore Year ===
Started eight games and played in 30 contests on the season. Seven of his starts came in conference action. Averaged 5.0 points on the season and 5.6 points per game in SEC games. First player off the bench nine times. In eight games as a starter, averaged 8.6 points and 4.0 rebounds in 26.3 minutes per game. Had a career game against Louisville when he recorded career-highs for points (13), rebounds (8), field goals made (5), field goals attempted (10) and minutes played (35). Improved his scoring mark the next game with a 14-point effort against seventh-ranked Kentucky. Earned his first starting assignment of the season at Florida.

=== Junior Year ===
Earned a share of the Lowell Blanchard Award as the most improved player on the team. As a team captain, he started 29 of Tennessee's 30 games. Ranked third on the team with 10.6 points while shooting a team-best 55.6 percent (125-of-225) from the field. In SEC games shot 58.4 percent (59-of-101) from the field. 70 career blocked shots are 13th all-time at Tennessee. 32 blocked shots on the season were second on the team. Averaged 15.0 points and 6.5 rebounds in two NCAA Tournament games. Set a school NCAA Tournament record with five blocked shots against Wichita State. Five offensive rebounds against the Shockers tied the school NCAA Tournament record ... Shot 57.9 percent (11-of-19) from the field in the NCAA Tournament. Reached double-figure scoring in 20 games after reaching double-figures just three times his first two years at UT. Scored 16 points (his most ever in an SEC game) while grabbing three rebounds and passing out three assists versus Vanderbilt. Led the Vols with a career-high 18 points on 6-of-8 shooting and a perfect 6-of-6 from the free-throw line versus Eastern Kentucky. Scored 12 points at Texas while helping limit LaMarcus Aldridge to just four field goals. Overcame a foot injury to score 12 points and block three shots in 28 minutes of action against Louisiana-Lafayette.

== Professional career ==
=== Greece/Turkey ===
After leaving Tennessee Wingate tried out for the Greek Basket League team Makedonikos where he played only 4 games averaging 26 minutes 10.6 points 4 rebounds 1 assist shooting 56.4% from the field 62.3% from the free throw line and 20% from behind the arc. After a brief time spent here he joined Tofas Bursa in the Turkish Basketball League where he played 23 games averaging 26 minutes, 6.6 points, 6 rebounds, making 49.6% from the field and 50% from the free throw line. His best game was a game against Pınar Karşıyaka where he scored 18 points, 7 rebounds, 7–10 shooting from the field. He finished the season in Turkey with a total of 170 points, 146 rebounds, and 16 assists.

=== China ===
After his rookie year in Turkey he left Europe for China where he played for the Chinese Basketball Association team Shanxi Zhongyu. Playing 29 games, 27 minutes Wingate averaged 13.7 points, 6.5 rebounds 1.8 assists shooting career-highs from the field 64.8, and free throw line 64.2.

=== France/Romania ===
Wingate joined UJAP Quimper 29, a team playing in the French Basketball 2nd League. He only played 5 games here and averaged a career-low 17 minutes, 6.6 points, 2.6 rebounds. While visiting his wife who was playing volley-ball in Târgu Mureş, Romania, Wingate caught the attention of the local team's coach and soon from the crowd Wingate joined the action on the floor for BC Mureş a team in the Romanian Basketball Division A. Wingate played 19 games for Mures, with a career high average of 14.5 points, 9.5 rebounds, 1.3 assists, shooting 57.9% from the field and 60% from the free throw line.

Wingate fitted in well in the defensive-oriented team and rapidly became the home crowd's favorite because of his high-flying style of play which kept the crowd on the edge of their feet. He broke his career-highs in scoring 2 and rebounding 17. At the end of the season, he was one of the top centers in the league-leading in rebounds, block shots, and double-doubles. He also pulled off one of the most spectacular plays in the Romanian Basketball Division A ever with a 360 dunk in front of the home crowd.

=== Springfield ===
Wingate was drafted by the newly formed NBA affiliate team Springfield Armor in the 2nd round. After missing the preseason and the first game in the team's history because of personal reasons Wingate joined the team on November 27. Already in the 2nd game for his new team he became the player of the game although the Armor lost, Wingate finished with 17 points, 9 rebounds 5–7 shooting from the field 7–8 from the free throw line.

Wingate was a fan favorite in Springfield, constantly praised for his hustle and passion. Wingate unexpectedly left the team in late January. When asked by fans Josh Parsons, Eric O'Brien, and Garret Cagna of Wingate's whereabouts, Armor head coach Dee Brown responded, "If you find him, let me know." Wingate was officially released on January 26, 2010.

== Personal life ==
A member of the National Honor Society, he received the Who's Who Scholarship Achievement Award. Wingate coached the San Diego Bulldogs AAU basketball team in Carmel Valley, San Diego, CA.

Wingate died on October 2, 2021, at the age of 37.
