= BCM Olimpic Baia Mare =

Romanian basketball club

- Nickname: Băimărenii (The People from Baia Mare); Olimpicii (The Olympians)
- Leagues: Liga Națională
- Founded: 2006
- Dissolved: 2017
- Arena: Lascăr Pană
- Capacity: 2,048
- Location: Baia Mare, Romania
- Team colors: Red, Blue, White
- President: George Opriș
- Head coach: Sebastian Man
- Ownership: Baia Mare Municipality
- Website: Official website
Home	Away

BCM Olimpic Baia Mare was a professional basketball team from Baia Mare, Romania. The team played in the Liga Națională.

== History ==
BCM Olimpic Baia Mare was founded in 2006 and in its short history the club played mainly in Liga I, Romanian second basketball league. In 2016 they finished on 2nd place and promoted to Liga Națională for the first time in their history.

== Honours ==
Liga I

Runners-up (1): 2016–2017

== 2016–2017 roster ==
Note: Flags indicate national team eligibility at FIBA-sanctioned events. Players may hold other non-FIBA nationalities not displayed.

BCM Olimpic Baia Mare roster
Players
Coaches

Pos.	No.	Nat.	Name	Ht.
SG	1	(United States)	Armstrong, Andre	1.90 m (6 ft 3 in)
G/F	2	(Romania)	Dunca, Vasile	1.92 m (6 ft 4 in)
PG	7	(Romania)	Tohătan, Lucas	1.82 m (6 ft 0 in)
F/C	8	(Serbia)	Macura, Miloš	2.11 m (6 ft 11 in)
C	9	(Romania)	Ilicov, Florin	2.00 m (6 ft 7 in)
C	20	(Romania)	Țîbîrnă, Lucian	2.08 m (6 ft 10 in)
F	21	(Romania)	Dohi, Andrei	2.07 m (6 ft 9 in)
G	23	(United States)	Stokley, Isiah	1.93 m (6 ft 4 in)
SG	24	(Romania)	Dumitrescu, Vlad (C)	1.90 m (6 ft 3 in)
G	31	(Serbia)	Pajković, Luka	1.90 m (6 ft 3 in)
C	40	(Serbia)	Pavlović, Marko	2.10 m (6 ft 11 in)
SF	55	(Romania)	Movileanu, Adrian	1.95 m (6 ft 5 in)

Head coach

- (Romania) Man Sebastian

Assistant coach(es)

- (Romania) Donca Dan

Legend

- (C) Team captain
- Injured

- Roster
Updated: 13 February 2017
