= BC Mureș =

Romanian men's basketball club

Mureș
- Nickname: Tigrii (The Tigers)
- Founded: 2004
- Dissolved: 2018
- Arena: Sala Sporturilor
- Capacity: 2,000
- Location: Târgu Mureș, Romania

Baschet Club Mureș, commonly known as BC Mureș, was a Romanian professional basketball team based in Târgu Mureș, Romania. The club was a member of the Liga Națională. The team was nicknamed "The Tigers", while its home arena was known as "The Jungle" for its loud atmosphere and home-court advantage.

After reaching the playoffs four times without advancing past the first round, BC Mureș reached the finals of the 2012–13 LNBM season, but were defeated 4–2 in the series by CSU Asesoft Ploiesti. In 2013, BC Mureș debuted in Europe in the EuroChallenge and in 2018, the club was dissolved.

== History ==
Former logo.

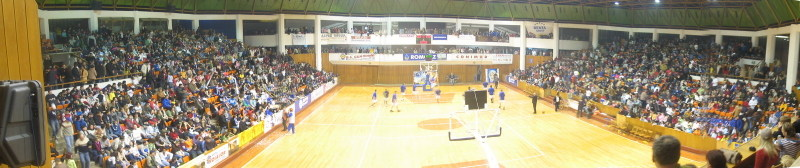
The interior of the home arena of the club

In its first season (2004–05), BC Mureș started out in the B Division but quickly moved up to the A Division in only one season where they held their position to the day of dissolution. In the 2005–06 season, BC Mureș Coach Mihai Corui signed their first American player in the club's history Terry Cooper , who was playing in the Dutch Basketball PromotieDivisie, in order to strengthen their team. American Gerald Cannon and Canadian Dwayne Burton followed thereafter. The team's performance improved after signing these new players and experienced better crowd attendance, however, the team ultimately finished 13th in the league. BC Mureș was expected to be demoted to the B Division as a result until the league decided to increase the number of teams to 14, securing their position in the A Division.

Taking advantage of this opportunity in the 2006–07 season, BC Mureș put together a team that relied mostly on USA players and with the whole city behind their back they fell only one game short from reaching the playoffs. Following the successful previous season in 2007–08 the team brought back, the already crowd favorites JuJuan Cooley, Bryan McCullough and added more important pieces to the roster. The team performed very well at home struggling away from "The Jungle" but they managed to secure the first playoff appearance in the club's history. BC Mures finished 8th and had to duel in the first round of the playoffs with the multiple champions and heavy favorite CSU Asesoft Ploiesti, but even though they fought hard they were swept 2–0 in a three-game series.

In the 2008–09 season the expectations were high for BC Mures and the fans were ecstatic for a new successful season but things did not go as they hoped. After only 5 games head coach Mihai Corui stepped down from his position, which was occupied by Lithuanian Audrius Prakuraitis. The season was a disappointing one although the team played a more organized basketball but in the end did not manage to enter the playoffs. The ownership was satisfied with Audrius Prakuraitis as head coach and brought him back for another year in the 2009–10 season. BC Mures this time relied mostly on European players, the only USA presence being the returning team captain JuJuan Cooley. The season was a fairly successful one for a well coached team that surprised a few top teams and in the end locked down the last spot to the playoffs. Here they would go head to head with U-Mobitelco Cluj Napoca forcing the would-be champions that year into the decisive game in a 5-game series, where BC Mures was eliminated after a hard-fought game.

For BC Mures the 2010–11 season marked what was the beginning of the climb to one of the elite teams of the Romanian National League. With the only familiar face being JuJuan Cooley the team went through a total overhaul, with a new coach in the person of Hungarian Deri Csaba and new players, whom clearly formed the best roster in the club's history until that point. BC Mures also debuted in their first European competition, in the regional Balkan International Basketball League, finishing with a 3–5 record but not advancing past the group stage. The high hopes that were put into this team were in most part confirmed, performing very well in the domestic league. BC Mures qualified for the first time in the Final-Four of the Romanian Cup which was held in their home arena but they failed to use this advantage finishing 4th. Although the wins rolled in the team showcased some weaknesses which resulted in a few unexpected losses that put them in the 5th seed at the end of the regular season. Not securing the home court advantage came as a blow to the team as they simply could not gather the necessary energy and motivation to win a single game in a five-game series in the first round of the playoffs in front of the newly promoted CSA Steaua Turabo Bucuresti, therefore prematurely ending a season in which the fans and also the ownership were sure they would at least go past the first round of the playoffs.

Although the previous season ended in disappointment it was still the best performance in the club's history until that point so the core players and coach Deri Csaba were brought back and a few important names were added such as Romanian big guy Virgil Stanescu. The successful acquisitions gave the ownership enough confidence to set the objective for the 2011–12 season to reaching the finals. The players no doubt put together a group that was one of the best in the league but they never quite managed to play as a team which led to a few disappointing losses, overall even though the players were better the team performed worse than the previous season which determined the ownership to fire coach Deri Csaba mid season and bring in Serbian Srecko Sekulovic. The coach change proved to be an inspired one as the team's play improved significantly, Sekulovic leading BC Mures to a number of firsts in the club's history and winning some games, notably away games, that not a lot of people expected. The team finished strong but only managed to secure the 6th seed and were set to battle U-Mobitelco Cluj-Napoca once again in the first round of the playoffs. Even though the team was optimistic heading into the playoffs a few locker room problems led to the shocking departure of team captain and crowd hero JuJuan Cooley right before the first game of the playoffs. This departure left the team without a real point-guard and BC Mures struggled but managed to win one game in a five-game series. Even though the playoffs followed the same disappointing story of the previous seasons BC Mures had won a valuable coach in the person of Srecko Sekulovic who was signed for another season in which he had full control over the player selection.

Once again the team suffered a full overhaul only one player surviving the previous season, new team captain Liviu Dumitru. Changes were made at the ownership level too Szalkay Jozsef leaving his president position to Cornel Lungu. As the season approached the acquisitions did not leave a strong impact for the fans and the objective was set to reaching the playoffs, which also did not give much hopes of a good season. It was the first time in club's history that the roster did not include a USA player, the team relying on a more organized basketball and players who fight hard on the court. The first game of the regular season came and it brought a loss which seemed to confirm the fans fears that the team was not as good as the ones in the previous season. BC Mures bounced back hard though and unexpectedly won a game on the champions CSU Asesoft Ploiest home court which started a 6-game winning streak that proved all the doubters wrong and had the fans dazzled. As the regular season went on the team started to perform better and better each day went by. BC Mures went on an 8-game winning streak to finish off the regular season and clinched the 1st seed in the last game day after CSM Oradea the leaders for 29 legs lost their last game. It was an unbelievable performance considering the fact that it came when not even the most optimistic fan expected it. BC Mures was set to finally advance from the first round of the playoff which they did winning 3–1 a five-game series, but the fans were still reserved in what was to come next, being aware that there are teams in the playoff that were considered better. Things got even more positive for BC Mures though as they swept the second round of the playoffs winning 3–0 in a five-game series, eliminating CS Gaz Metan Mediaş. What seemed to be a far away dream for the BC Mures fans became reality and the city rejoiced as they were getting ready to battle eight-time champions in the past nine seasons and rivals CSU Asesoft Ploiest. BC Mures won the first game of the finals but the back to back game schedule was tough, for the squad formed of older players and they fell short in the second game giving the game to Ploiesti. In the third game of the seven game series BC Mures showcased its incredible offensive abilities, dropping 13 three-pointers blowing out CSU Asesoft Ploiesti. Having done what they needed to send the game back to Mures, they couldn't bring the same offensive fire in the next day and Ploiesti tied the series 2–2. The pressure was huge for BC Mures who had to protect their home court in game five but the long and tough series seemed to slow the team down a bit as they made some mistakes in the final minutes which cost them huge, losing a must-win game. Ploiesti, the experienced team had the chance to close out the series on their home court and even though BC Mures fought hard until the last seconds they were outlasted and thus the incredible season for BC Mures ended and they had to be satisfied with the second place. At the return from Ploiesti the players were welcomed by a big number of fans who awarded them with gold medals signifying that for them they are the real champions, something that also seemed to be a general thought around the league.

After the strong season, BC Mureș' focus in the 2013–14 season was resigning coach Srećko Sekulović for another two years and also bringing back the players who had a major contribution to the 2012–13 run. The team followed a similar strategy to the previous season, relying on European players and they signed a couple of important and experienced players who played in the LNBM, who along with last years players formed a team just as strong if not stronger than previous seasons vice champion team. BC Mures also debuted in a continental Europe competition, EuroChallenge where they delivered a huge upset in the first game day winning on the home court of heavy favorite BC Tsmoki-Minsk

=== 2012–13 season ===
The 2012–13 season was a great season for the team. BC Mureș finished first in the regular season with 23 wins and 7 losses, and qualified for the Play-offs. In the first round the team won with 3–1 against CSM Bucharest, and won in the second round against Romanian Cup Winners: CS Gaz Metan Medias with 3–0. In the final the team lost against CSU Asesoft Ploiesti with 4–2. But this performance gave the team an opportunity to play in the EuroChallenge for the 2013–14 season.

After the end of the 2017–18 season, the club was dissolved.

== European record ==
Mureș had a 3–3 (50%) record in one season of European play, which was the 2013–14 FIBA EuroChallenge.

Season	Competition	Round	Club	Home	Away
2013–14	FIBA EuroChallenge	RS	(Belarus) Tsmoki Minsk	82–84	79–83
2013–14	FIBA EuroChallenge	RS	(Bulgaria) Rilski Sportist	92–85	70–68
2013–14	FIBA EuroChallenge	RS	(Hungary) Szolnoki Olaj	72–85	68–76

== Season by season ==
Seasons	Championships	Cups	Europe	Coach	Roster
2004–05	1st place (B Division)	First Round	No tournament	Mihai Corui	George Trif, Mihai Corui, Bogdan Cormos, Puscas Bogdan, Fodor Laszlo, Soos Zsolt, Patru Daniel, Muresean Ioan, Ionel Brustur, Silviu Vrancianu
2005–06	13th place	First Round	No tournament	Mihai Corui	Terry Cooper , Dwayne Burton, Gerald Cannon, George Trif, Soos Zsolt, Muresean Ioan, Puscas Bogdan, Vajda Attila, Ionel Brustur, Bogdan Cormos, Silviu Vrancianu, Fodor Laszlo
2006–07	9th place	First Round	No tournament	Mihai Corui	JuJuan Cooley, Bryan McCullough, Troy Selvey, Jay Anderson, Trif George, Vlad Pora, Szaszgaspar Barnabas, Jakab Cristian, Patru Daniel, Puscas Bogdan, Bogdan Cormos, Fodor Laszlo, Muresean Ioan
2007–08	8th place	First Round	No tournament	Mihai Corui	JuJuan Cooley, Bryan McCullough, Troy Selvey, Louis Truscott, Jay Anderson, Frank Russell, Jon Clark, Jakab Cristian, Biro Ferenc, Muresean Ioan, Soos Zsolt, Patru Daniel, Puscas Bogdan, Bogdan Cormos, Pora Vlad
2008–09	10th place	First Round	No tournament	Mihai Corui; Audrius Prakuraitis	JuJuan Cooley, Major Wingate, Marius Pocioukonis, Luke McKenna, Sean Knitter, Levi Levine, Haron Hargrave, Corey Largent, Sean Coombs, Santa Szabolcs, Jakab Cristian, Vajda Attila, Vlad Pora, Trif George, Muresean Ioan, Trif George, Soos Zsolt, Bogdan Cormos, Puscas Bogdan, Patru Daniel, Biro Ference
2009–10	8th place	Second Round	No tournament	Audrius Prakuraitis	JuJuan Cooley, Vaidotas Peciukas, Arturas Masiulis, Marius Pociukonis, Branislav Tomic, Keyron Sheard, Travis Reed, Qavostaraj Waddell, Mike Jefferson, Catalin Vlaicu, Marius Bulancea, Jakab Cristian, Eugeniu Melnik, Vajda Attila, Pora Vlad, Hallai Gabriel
2010–11	5th place	Final Four	Balkan International Basketball League; Group Stage	Deri Csaba	JuJuan Cooley, Jason Forte, Aleksandar Mladenovic, Dwight Lewis, Gytis Sirutavicius, Nicholas Covington, Eddy Mayfield, Jason Straight, Liviu Dumintru, Flavius Lapuste, Andrei Capusan, Pora Vlad, Patru Daniel, Pora Vlad, Jakab Cristian, Mihai Buciuman, Pascu Norbert, Hallai Gabriel
2011–12	6th place	First Round	No tournament	Deri Csaba; Srećko Sekulović	JuJuan Cooley, Virgil Stanescu, Jason Forte, Calvin Watson, Miladin Pekovic, Mikalai Aliakseyeu, Uros Mirkovic, Liviu Dumitru, Flavius Lapuste, Adrian Tudor, Radu Paliciuc, Baczo Balazs, Gabriel Hallai, Borsa Alin
2012–13	Finalist	First Round	No tournament	Srećko Sekulović	Branko Cuic, Vaidotas Peciukas, Matija Ceskovic, Andrija Ciric, Ousmane Barro, Gediminas Navickas, Damjan Kandic, Darko Balaban, Temi Adebayo, Liviu Dumitru, Tudor Jucan, Dan Paltinisanu, Daniel Tudosa, Jakab Cristian, Baczo Balazs, Oprea Adrian, Oltean Gabriel, Steff Norbert, Borsa Alin
2013–14	3rd place	Quarter Finals	EuroChallenge Cup	Srećko Sekulović	Vaidotas Peciukas, Andrija Ciric, Gediminas Navickas, Tudor Jucan, Dan Paltinisanu, Jakab Cristian, Baczo Balazs, Goran Martinic, Alekcsandar Mladenovic, Silviu Lupusavei, Adrian Oprea, Ivan Jelenic, Ivan Ivanovic, Denham Brown

== Head coaches ==
Coach	From	To
(Romania) Mihai Corui	2004	2008
(Lithuania) Audrius Prakuraitis	2008	2010
(Romania) Deri Csaba	2010	2012
(Serbia) Srećko Sekulović	2012	2014
(Lithuania) Audrius Prakuraitis	2014	2016

== Notable players ==
Note: Flags indicate national team eligibility at FIBA-sanctioned events. Players may hold other non-FIBA nationalities not displayed.

Criteria

To appear in this section a player must have either:

- Set a club record or won an individual award while at the club
- Played at least one official international match for their national team at any time
- Played at least one official NBA match at any time.

- (Romania) Virgil Stanescu
- (Romania) Flavius Lapuste
- (Romania) Liviu Dumitru
- (Montenegro) Branko Cuic
- (Croatia) Matija Češković
- (United States) JuJuan Cooley
- (United States) Major Wingate
- (United States) Troy Selvey
- (United States) Jason Forte
- (Senegal) Ousmane Barro
