= Troy Selvey =

American basketball player

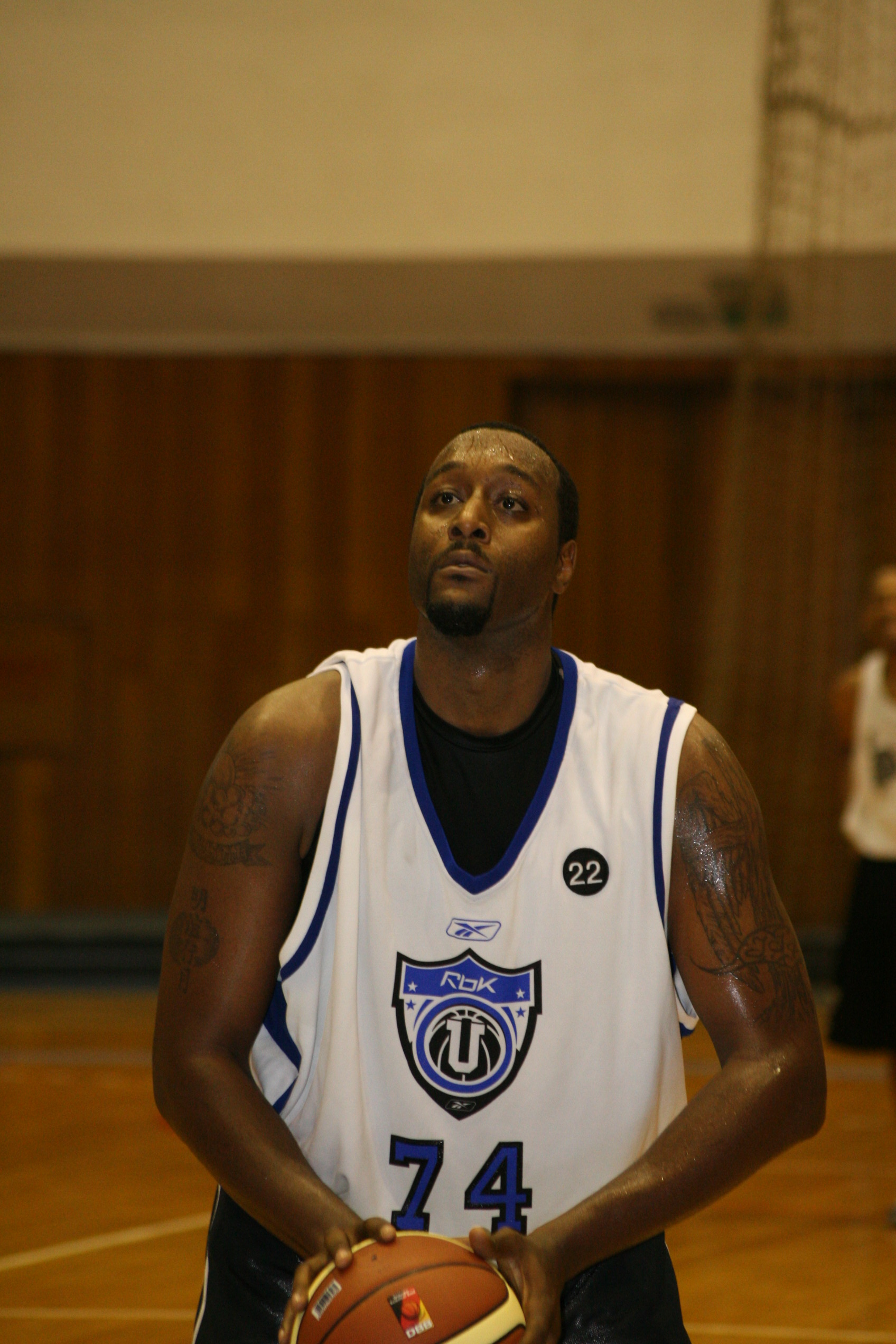
Troy Selvey

Troy Selvey (born July 1, 1980, in Denver, Colorado) is an American former basketball player who played until December 2007 for Bc Mures, in the Romanian Basketball Division A. He plays center or power forward positions and his height is 2,03 m (weight: 116 kg). His previous teams were: Sacramento State Hornets, Los Piasas de Cabo San Lucas (CIBACOPA in Mexico), Coventry Crusaders (England), Essex Leopards (England) and Tabera (Uruguay).

== BC Mures ==
He played for BC Mures almost two consecutive seasons. In the 2006/2007 regular season he played in 25 games, averaging 33.7 minutes, 14.2 points and 9.1 rebounds. His team finished on the 9th place in the Romanian first division, being just one win away from the playoffs.
