= Jujuan Cooley =

American basketball player (born 1982)

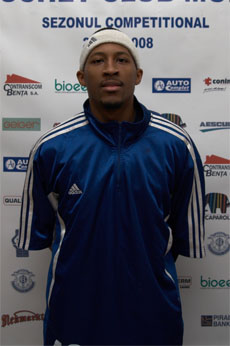

No. 22 – BC Mureș
- Position: Point guard

Personal information
- Born: January 31, 1982 (age 43) Flint, Michigan, U.S.
- Listed height: 5 ft 10 in (1.78 m)
- Listed weight: 170 lb (77 kg)

Career information
- High school: Flint Southwestern (Flint, Michigan)
- College: Indiana Tech (2003–2005)
- NBA draft: 2005: undrafted
- Playing career: 2005–present

JuJuan Laray Cooley (/dʒuːdʒuːən lɑːreɪ kuːli/; born January 31, 1982) is an American basketball player who played for six years in Romania for the BC Mureș team between 2006–2012. In the 2009 off-season, he decided to give it a try in the NBA Development League.

== Career statistics ==
Season	Team	League	GM	PTS	REB	AST	STL	BLK	FG%	3FG%	FT%	MIN
2003–04	Indiana Tech Warriors	NAIA Division 1	34	13.93	2.65	5.29	2.91	—N/a	—N/a	—N/a	—N/a	—N/a
2004–05	Indiana Tech Warriors	NAIA Division 1	37	13.91	2.65	5.29	2.91	—N/a	—N/a	—N/a	—N/a	—N/a
2005–06	Liberty Seguros Casa Branca	Brazil-NLB	27	21.63	2.59	6.11	2.7	—N/a	—N/a	—N/a	—N/a	29.81
2006–07	BC Mureș Târgu Mureș	Romanian Division 1	25	20.4	3.4	6.52	3.4	—N/a	57.7	28.9	77.2	38
2007–12	BC Mureș Târgu Mureș	Romanian Division 1	25	18.12	3.8	6.4	2.92	0.28	51.2	35.2	79.2	38

== Awards and honors ==
- NAIA 1st Team All-American 2005
- Romanian All Star Game Selection 2007
- Romanian All Star Game Selection 2008
- Led League In Assists 2009
- Romanian All-Star Game MVP 2009

== Personal life ==
Cooley graduated magna cum laude in Business Administration with Alpha Chi honors at Indiana Tech, in 2005. His interests are video games, computers and movies.
