= Srđan Vuksanović =

Kazakhstani water polo player

Personal information
- Nationality: Serbian-Kazakhstani
- Born: 5 July 1992 (age 34) Novi Sad, Serbia
Medal record
Men's water polo
Representing Serbia
Universiade
Gold medal – first place	2011 Shenzhen	Team
Bronze medal – third place	2013 Kazan	Team
Representing Kazakhstan
Asian Games
Silver medal – second place	2026 Aichi–Nagoya	Team
Bronze medal – third place	2022 Hangzhou	Team

Srđan Vuksanović (born 5 July 1992) is a Serbian-Kazakhstani water polo player. He competed in the men's tournament at the 2020 Summer Olympics.
