= Louis Truscott =

American basketball player (born 1978)

Personal information
- Born: October 7, 1978 (age 47) Houston, Texas, U.S.
- Listed height: 6 ft 6 in (1.98 m)
- Listed weight: 223 lb (101 kg)

Career information
- High school: Milby (Houston, Texas)
- College: Nebraska (1998–2000); Houston (2001–2003)
- NBA draft: 2003: undrafted
- Playing career: 2003–2008
- Position: Power forward

Career highlights
- First-team All-Conference USA (2003)

Louis Andrew Truscott (born October 7, 1978) is a former American professional basketball player. He played for BC Mureș in Romanian Basketball Division A.

== Career ==
=== 2002-03 ===
Truscott played for Houston in NCAA Division 1. In 28 games, he averaged 15.32 points, 11.32 rebounds and 1.11 assists.

=== 2003-04 ===
Truscott was drafted by the Gary Steelheads of the CBA. He was chosen 15th in the second round. He played 12 games, averaging 0.3 points, 5.8 rebounds, and 9 assists per game. In 2003, he participated in the Southern California Summer Pro League with the Houston Rockets.

=== 2004-05 ===
Truscott was transferred to the London Towers of the British Basketball League. He played 12 games, averaging 17.33 points, 8.83 rebounds, and 1.25 assists per game, with a field goal percentage of 66.7% and a three-point shooting percentage of 33.3%. He finished the season with the Asheville Altitude of the NBA Development League, playing 8 games, averaging 4.4 points, 2.4 rebounds, and 13.3 minutes per game.

=== 2005-07 ===
Truscott spent two years in South America playing for several teams in different countries. He started for the Correcaminos Tampico-Reynos of the Mexican League in 2005 (9 games with 15.4 ppg, 10.2 rpg, 2FGP:71.3%, 3FGP:40%, FT:61.3%, APG: .3%). He then moved to the Bolivian League, where he played for Nonis Santa Cruz (19 ppg, 12 rpg). Truscott finished the season in Uruguay with Paysandu (20.1 ppg, 10.8 rpg, 4th in rebounds). For the 2005–2006 season, he played in Argentina for Ferrocarril Oeste Capital Federal (14.7 ppg, 7.8 rpg), and in 2006, he was in Chile playing for Deportes Ancud, where he averaged 23 ppg and 16 rpg. He returned to Argentina in 2007, playing for Parana Echague (21 ppg, 12 rpg).

=== 2007-08 (half season) ===
In 2008, he spent the second half of the Romanian Division A season playing for BC Mureș. One of the best forwards in the league, he helped the team to qualify for the playoffs, and fans loved his professionalism and spectacular playing style. Truscott was the 5th highest scorer in Romania Division A for this period. From May through July 2008, he started every game, averaging 20.08 points, 9.23 rebounds, 1.31 assists, 0.54 steals, 0.38 blocks, 69.1% field goals made, 22.7% from the three-point line, 67.5% free throws, and 35.08 minutes.

== Awards and honors ==
- High School: Top 100 Players at Houston's Milby High School. Among Basketball America's Super 64 recruits and one of the top recruits from the Houston area. Was ranked No. 1 in the state for much of the season, was named the MVP in District 18-5A and at Milby as a junior and senior. In his senior year he was also named a second-team All-Greater Houston selection by the Houston Chronicle, and he earned first-team all-District 18-5A and all-region honors.
- 1999-2000: Most Valuable Reserve
- 2003: All Conference USA 1st Team
- 2008: Eurobasket Romania All Import Team
