= Nikola Dedović =

Serbian water polo player

Personal information
- Nationality: Serbian
- Born: 25 January 1992 (age 34) Belgrade, Serbia, Yugoslavia

Sport
- Sport: Water polo
- Current club: Radnički Kragujevac

Senior clubs
- Years: Team
- 2011–2014: Partizan
- 2014–2015: Radnički Kragujevac
- 2015: Sliema
- 2015–2016: Primorje Rijeka
- 2016–?: Spandau 04
- ?–present: Radnički Kragujevac
Medal record
Men's water polo
Representing Serbia
Olympic Games
Gold medal – first place	2020 Tokyo	Team
Gold medal – first place	2024 Paris	Team
European Championship
Gold medal – first place	2014 Budapest
Gold medal – first place	2026 Belgrade
Universiade
Gold medal – first place	2011 Shenzhen	Team
Bronze medal – third place	2013 Kazan	Team

Nikola Dedović (Serbian Cyrillic: Никола Дедовић; born 25 January 1992) is a Serbian water polo player for Radnički Kragujevac. He was a member of the Serbia men's national water polo team that won a gold medal at the 2020 Summer Olympics.
