= Nikola Marković (basketball) =

Serbian basketball player

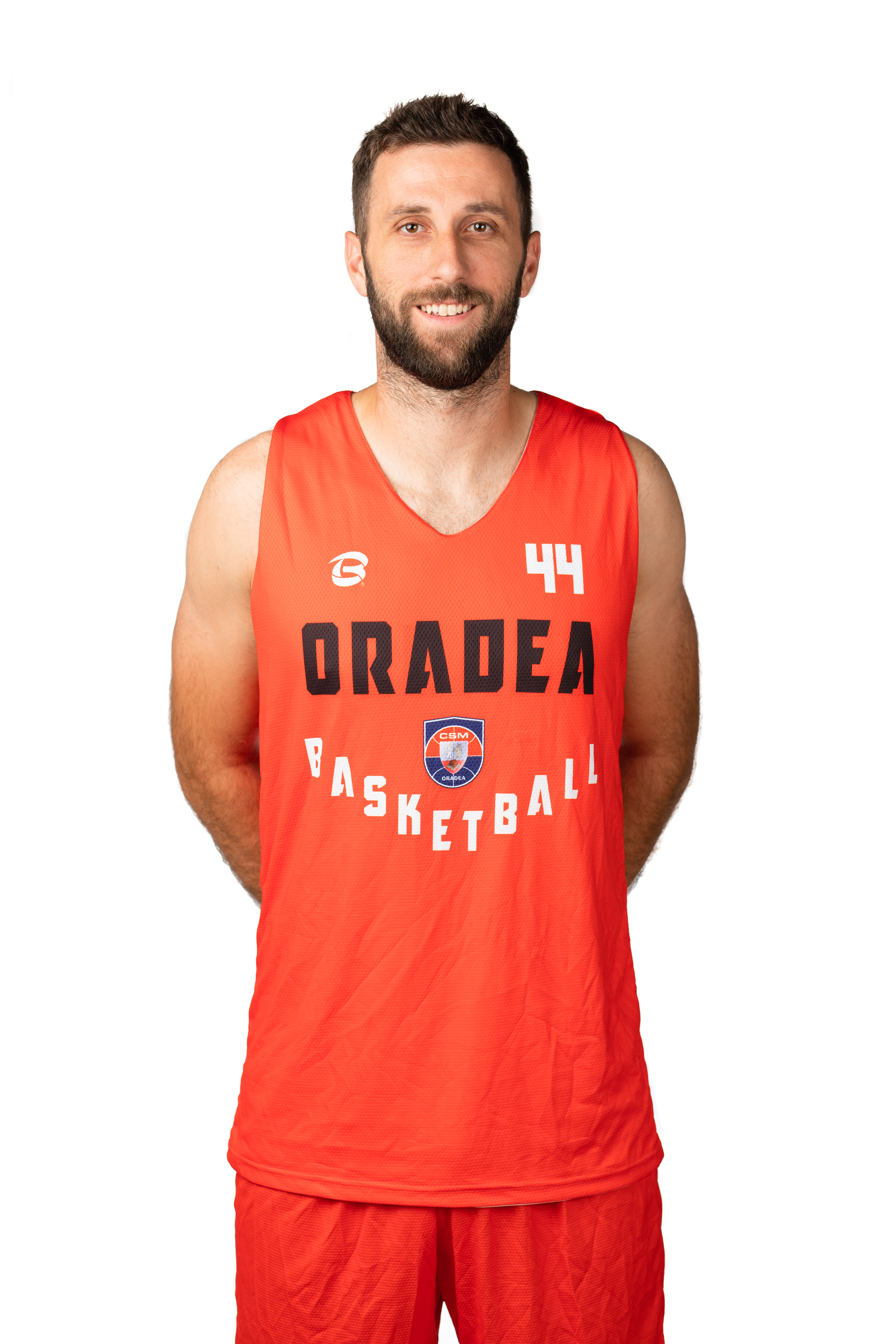
- Markovic with CSM Oradea

No. 11 – Metalac Valjevo
- Position: Power forward / center
- League: Basketball League of Serbia

Personal information
- Born: 7 July 1989 (age 37) Belgrade, SR Serbia, Yugoslavia
- Listed height: 6 ft 10 in (2.08 m)
- Listed weight: 232 lb (105 kg)

Career information
- NBA draft: 2014: undrafted
- Playing career: 2014–present

Career history
- 2007–2011: FMP Železnik
- 2009–2010: → Radnički FMP
- 2011–2012: Crvena zvezda
- 2012–2013: Radnički FMP
- 2013: Vojvodina Srbijagas
- 2013–2014: KAOD
- 2014–2015: Panelefsiniakos
- 2015–2016: PAOK
- 2016–2018: Trefl Sopot
- 2018: Stelmet Zielona Góra
- 2018–2019: Stal Ostrów Wielkopolski
- 2019–2024: CSM Oradea
- 2024–present: Metalac Valjevo
Medals
Men's basketball
Representing Serbia
FIBA Europe Under-18 Championship
Gold medal – first place	2007 Spain	U18 Team
Mediterranean Games
Silver medal – second place	2013 Mersin	National Team
Universiade
Bronze medal – third place	2013 Kazan	National Team

Nikola Marković (born 7 July 1989) is a Serbian professional basketball player for Metalac Valjevo of the Basketball League of Serbia. He is a 2.08 m (6 ft 10 in) tall power forward-center. He won one Championship with Oradea, and one SuperCup - both in 2020.

== Professional career ==
Markovic started his professional career at KK Mega Basket, where he had 6 successful seasons before moving to Radnički Belgrade.

He moved back to FMP Železnik for the 2010–11 season and went to Crvena zvezda for the 2011–12 season. He joined Radnički Belgrade again for the 2012–13 season, but in March 2013, he moved to Vojvodina Srbijagas. He then moved to KAOD for the 2013–14 season.

He joined Panelefsiniakos for the 2014–15 season, and for the next season he moved to PAOK.

In July 2016, he signed with Polish club Trefl Sopot. On 5 January 2018 he left Trefl Sopot and signed with Stelmet Zielona Góra for the rest of the season.

== National team career ==
Marković was a member of the junior national teams of Serbia. He played at the 2007 FIBA Europe Under-18 Championship in Spain, where he won the gold medal. He also played at the 2009 FIBA Europe Under-20 Championship.

He also played with Serbia at the 2013 Mediterranean Games, where he won a silver medal, and at the 2013 Summer Universiade, where he won a bronze medal.
