= Daniel Mullings =

Canadian basketball player (born 1991)

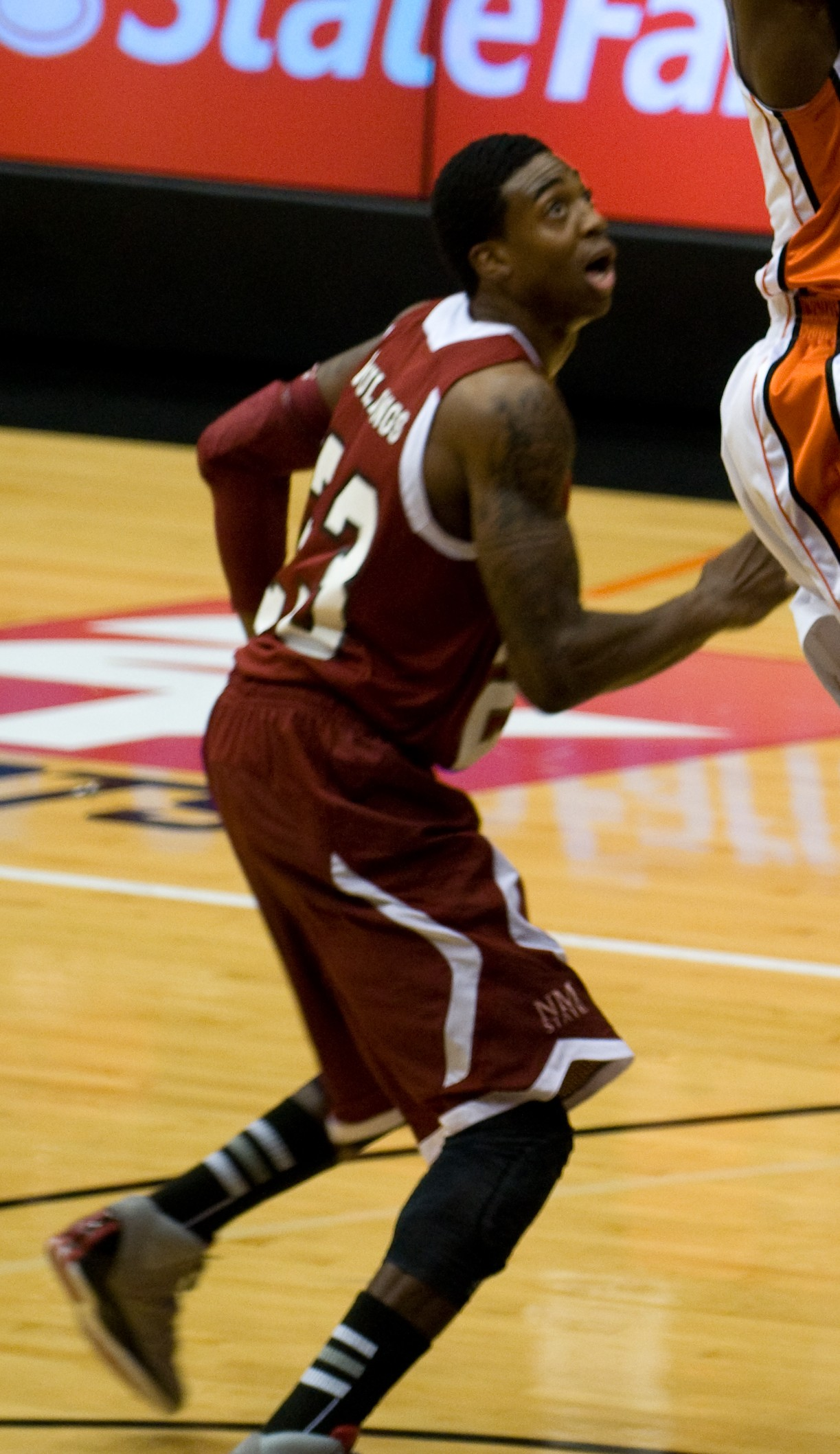
- Mullings in 2012

Personal information
- Born: July 26, 1991 (age 35) Toronto, Ontario, Canada
- Listed height: 6 ft 3 in (1.91 m)
- Listed weight: 170 lb (77 kg)

Career information
- High school: Sir Wilfrid Laurier (Toronto, Ontario)
- College: New Mexico State (2011–2015)
- NBA draft: 2015: undrafted
- Playing career: 2015–2023
- Position: Shooting guard

Career history
- 2015–2016: Medi Bayreuth
- 2016: Jianghuai Lightning
- 2016–2019: Kataja
- 2019–2020: Elitzur Yavne
- 2020: Niagara River Lions
- 2020–2021: Limburg United
- 2021–2022: Elitzur Yavne
- 2022–2023: Klosterneuburg Dukes
- 2023: Scarborough Shooting Stars

Career highlights
- CEBL champion (2023); Korisliiga champion (2015); WAC Player of the Year (2014); 2× First-team All-WAC (2014, 2015)
Medals
Men's basketball
Representing Canada
Pan American Games
Silver medal – second place	2015 Toronto	National team

Daniel Walden-Mullings (born July 26, 1991) is a Canadian former professional basketball player. He played college basketball for New Mexico State, and spent most of his professional career playing overseas.

== High school career ==
Mullings attended Sir Wilfrid Laurier Collegiate Institute in Scarborough, Toronto.

== College career ==
He played college basketball for the New Mexico State Aggies. Mullings was named Western Athletic Conference Player of the Year in 2014.

== Professional career ==
He had begun his professional career with Medi Bayreuth of the German Bundesliga in 2015.

On August 8, 2016, Mullings signed with Kataja in Finland, where he averaged 13.4 points, 7.1 rebounds, 2.9 assists and 2 steals per game in 48 games played during the 2018–19 season.

On August 5, 2019, Mullings signed a one-year deal with Elitzur Yavne of the Israeli National League.

Mullings signed with Limburg United of the Pro Basketball League on June 12, 2020. He averaged 8.3 points and 4.1 rebounds per game. On November 30, 2021, he signed with Klosterneuburg Dukes of the Austrian Basketball Superliga.

On May 13, 2023, Mullings signed with the Scarborough Shooting Stars.
