= Stefano Luongo =

Italian water polo player (born 1990)

Personal information
- Nationality: Italy
- Born: 5 January 1990 (age 36) Chiavari, Italy
- Height: 1.84 m (6 ft 0 in)

Sport
- Sport: Water polo
Medal record
Representing Italy
World Championships
Gold medal – first place	2019 Gwangju	Team competition
European Championships
Silver medal – second place	2014 Budapest	Team competition
Bronze medal – third place	2010 Zagreb	Team competition

Stefano Luongo (born 5 January 1990) is an Italian water polo player. He competed in the 2020 Summer Olympics.
