= Ivan Smiljanić (basketball) =

Serbian basketball player

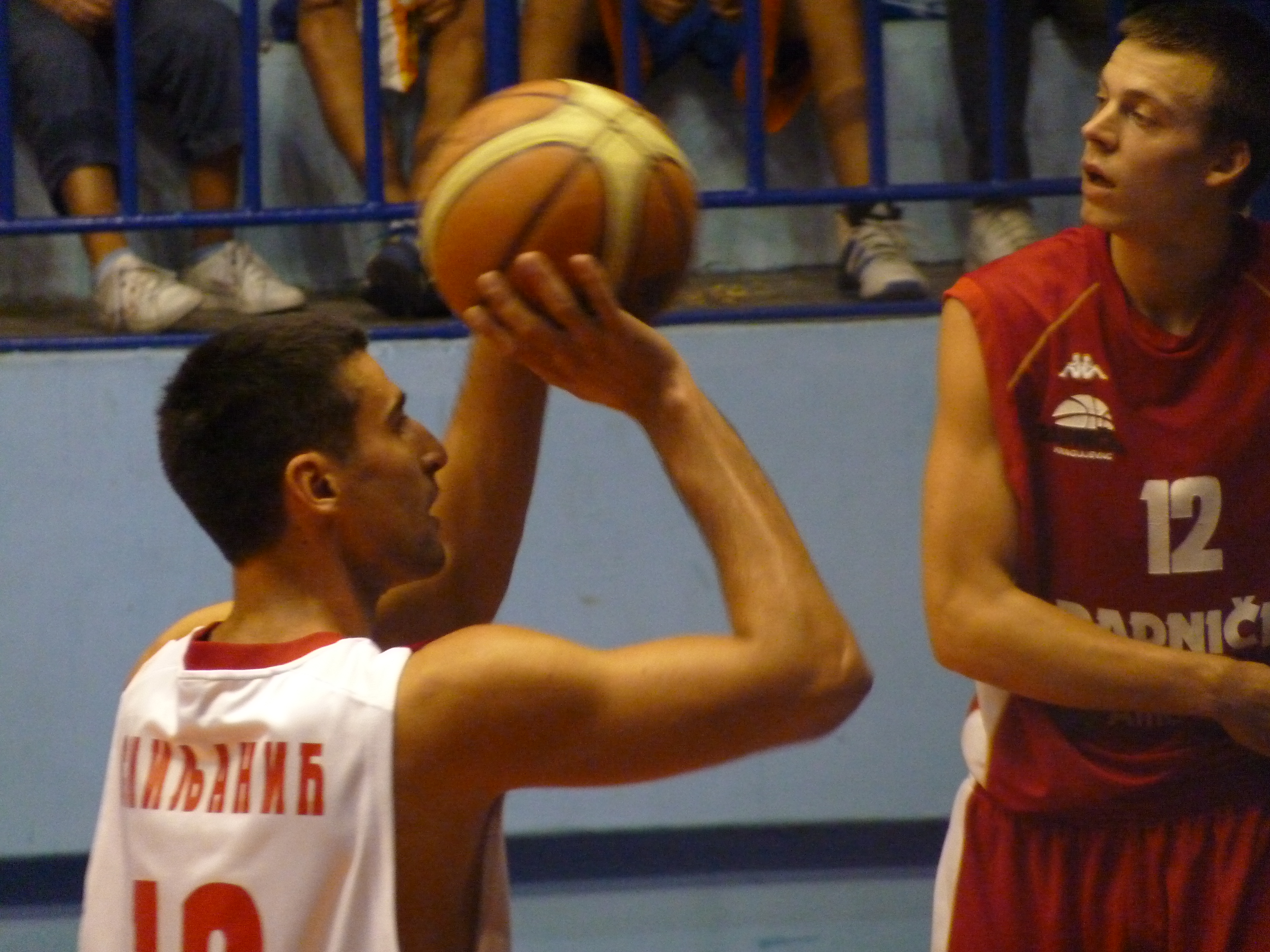

No. 16 – Tamiš
- Position: Forward
- League: Basketball League of Serbia

Personal information
- Born: 4 April 1989 (age 37) Belgrade, SFR Yugoslavia
- Listed height: 6 ft 7 in (2.01 m)

Career information
- NBA draft: 2011: undrafted
- Playing career: 2010–present

Career history
- 2010–2011: FMP
- 2011–2012: Radnički FMP
- 2012–2013: Crvena zvezda
- 2013–2014: FMP
- 2014–2015: OKK Beograd
- 2015: MBK Baník Handlová
- 2015–2016: Tamiš
- 2016–2017: BC Nevėžis
- 2017–2019: Tamiš
- 2019–2020: Dynamic
- 2020–present: Tamiš
Medals
Men's basketball
Representing Serbia
Universiade
Bronze medal – third place	2013 Kazan	Team competition
U18 European Championship
Gold medal – first place	2007 Spain	U18 Team

Ivan Smiljanić (Serbian Cyrillic: : Иван Смиљанић, born 4 April 1989) is a Serbian professional basketball player who currently plays for Tamiš of the Basketball League of Serbia.
