= Dejan Đokić (basketball) =

Serbian basketball player

Personal information
- Born: 11 August 1989 (age 37) Belgrade, SFR Yugoslavia
- Listed height: 1.87 m (6 ft 2 in)
- Listed weight: 81 kg (179 lb)

Career information
- NBA draft: 2011: undrafted
- Playing career: 2007–2018
- Position: Point guard
- Number: 4, 13, 16, 45

Career history
- 2007–2009: FMP 2
- 2009–2013: Radnički FMP
- 2013: Crvena zvezda
- 2013–2014: Vojvodina Srbijagas
- 2015: ABS Primorje
- 2015–2016: Zlatibor
- 2016: Metalac
- 2016–2017: Patrioti Levice
- 2017–2018: Spars Sarajevo

Career highlights
- Nike Global Challenge (2008)
Medals
Men's basketball
Representing Serbia
Universiade
Bronze medal – third place	2013 Kazan	Team

Dejan Đokić (Serbian Cyrillic: Дејан Ђокић; born 11 August 1989) is a Serbian former professional basketball player.

== Professional career ==
A point guard, Đokić played for FMP Reserves, Radnički Basket/Radnički FMP, Crvena zvezda, Vojvodina Srbijagas, ABS Primorje, Zlatibor, Metalac, Patrioti Levice, and Spars Sarajevo.

== National team career ==
Đokić was a member of the Serbian university team that won a bronze medal at the 2013 Summer Universiade in Kazan, Russia. Serbia had a 87–74 win over Canada in the bronze medal game. Over eight tournament games, he averaged 8.5 points, two rebounds, and 3.5 assists per game.

== Career achievements ==
- League Cup of Serbia winner: 3 (with Radnički Basket/Radnički FMP: 2009–10, 2010–11, 2011–12)
