= Stefan Živanović =

Serbian basketball player

Free agent
- Position: Shooting guard

Personal information
- Born: February 19, 1989 (age 37) Belgrade, SFR Yugoslavia
- Listed height: 1.95 m (6 ft 5 in)

Career information
- NBA draft: 2011: undrafted
- Playing career: 2007–present

Career history
- 2005–2007: Beovuk
- 2007–2011: FMP
- 2009–2010: →Radnički Basket
- 2012–2013: Metalac Valjevo
- 2013–2014: Kangoeroes Willebroek
- 2014–2015: Igokea
- 2015: Smederevo 1953
- 2015–2016: Timișoara
- 2016–2017: Kumanovo
- 2017–2018: Riviera Lakers
- 2018–2019: Beovuk 72
- 2019: Ermis Agias
- 2019–2020: Radnički Kragujevac
- 2020–2021: Vršac
- 2021–2022: Žitko Basket

Stefan Živanović (Serbian: Стефан Живановић; born 19 February 1989) is a Serbian professional basketball player who last played for Žitko Basket of the Second Basketball League of Serbia.

== Professional career ==
On 1 August 2019, Živanović signed with Kragujevački Radnički, of the Second Men's League of Serbia.
