= Darko Balaban =

Serbian basketball player

Personal information
- Born: 22 September 1989 (age 37) Novi Sad, SR Serbia, Yugoslavia
- Listed height: 2.11 m (6 ft 11 in)
- Listed weight: 105 kg (231 lb)

Career information
- NBA draft: 2011: undrafted
- Playing career: 2007–2026
- Position: Center

Career history
- 2007–2010: Partizan
- 2010–2011: Crvena zvezda
- 2011–2012: Smederevo 1953
- 2012: BKK Radnički
- 2012: Târgu Mureş
- 2013: Vršac
- 2013–2014: Feni Industries
- 2014: Smederevo 1953
- 2014–2015: Szedeák
- 2015: PAOK
- 2015–2016: Dinamo București
- 2016–2017: Club Africain
- 2017–2018: Borac Čačak
- 2018–2020: Melilla
- 2020–2021: Balkan
- 2021–2022: Kouchin Amol
- 2022: APR

Career highlights
- Serbian First League MVP (2012)

Darko Balaban (Serbian Cyrillic: Дарко Балабан; born 22 September 1989) is a Serbian professional basketball player.

== Professional career ==
Balaban grew up with KK Sport Key from Novi Sad where he played from 2003 to 2007 when he goes to Partizan. In 2010 he goes to Crvena zvezda where he stayed one season.

For the 2011–12 season he signed with KK Smederevo where he had great season and was named the MVP of the Basketball League of Serbia.

In March 2012 he signed with BKK Radnički for Serbian Super League but played only nine games and then left the team. Following season he started with Târgu Mureş, but left them in December 2012.

In October 2013, he signed with Vršac. He left them after only two games and signed with Feni Industries. In February 2014, he returned to Serbia and signed with his former team Smederevo.

In September 2014, he signed with the Hungarian club Naturtex SZTE-Szedeák for the 2014–15 season.

On 1 October 2015 he signed with the Greek club PAOK. However he left PAOK later that month after appearing in two league games and three Eurocup games. On 2 December 2015 he signed with Romanian club Dinamo București for the rest of the 2015–16 Liga Națională season.

On 16 November 2017 he signed with Borac Čačak for the rest of the 2017–18 season. On 18 August 2018 he signed with Club Melilla Baloncesto of the LEB Oro.

In the 2021–22 season, he played for Kouchin Amol of the Iranian Basketball Super League.

In July 2022, Balaban joined the Rwandan team APR of the Rwanda Basketball League (RBL).
