= 2015 EuroChallenge Final Four =

Tournament details
- Arena: Hayri Gür Arena; Trabzon, Turkey
- Dates: April 24, 2015 – April 26, 2014

Final positions
- Champions: (France) JSF Nanterre (1st title)
- Runners-up: (Turkey) Trabzonspor Medical Park
- Third place: (Romania) Energia Târgu Jiu
- Fourth place: (Germany) Fraport Skyliners

Awards and statistics
- MVP: (United States) Jamal Shuler

The 2015 EuroChallenge Final Four was the concluding tournament of the 2014–15 EuroChallenge season. The tournament was held in the Hayri Gür Arena in Trabzon, home of Trabzonspor Medical Park, one of the semifinalists. JSF Nanterre took the title, after beating hosts Trabzonspor 63–64 in the Final. Energia Târgu Jiu took third place, while Fraport Skyliners finished fourth.

== Bracket ==
Semifinals; 24 April
(Romania) Energia Târgu Jiu	63
(Turkey) Trabzonspor MP	83
(France) JSF Nanterre	84
(Germany) Fraport Skyliners	79

Final; 26 April
(Turkey) Trabzonspor MP	63
(France) JSF Nanterre	64
Third place game
(Romania) Energia Târgu Jiu	83
(Germany) Fraport Skyliners	80

== Semifinals ==
=== Semifinal 1 ===
24 April 2015
16:30

Report

JSF Nanterre (France)	84–79	(Germany) Fraport Skyliners
Scoring by quarter: 27-18, 18-19, 19-24, 20-18
Pts: Weems 25; Rebs: Jaiteh 8 Asts: Shuler 7		Pts: Armand 17; Rebs: Morrison, Robertson 8 Asts: Coobs 5

Hayri Gür Arena, Trabzon
Attendance: 1354
Referees: Manuel Mazzoni (ITA), Georgios Poursanidis (GRE), Milan Nedovic (SLO)

=== Semifinal 2 ===
24 April 2015
19:00

Report

Energia Târgu Jiu (Romania)	63–83	(Turkey) Trabzonspor Medical Park
Scoring by quarter: 22–17, 9–22, 18–19, 14–25
Pts: Watson 15; Rebs: Milošević 5 Asts: Watson 4		Pts: Hardy 26; Rebs: Ivanov 9 Asts: Bost 4

Hayri Gür Arena, Trabzon
Attendance: 6650
Referees: Neil Wilkinson (ENG), Fernando Calatrava Cuevas (ESP), Gellert Kapitany (HUN)

== Third place game ==
Giordan Watson hit a crucial three-point field goal with less than two seconds to go, to lead Energia to the win.

26 April 2015
16:30

Boxscore

Energia Târgu Jiu (Romania)	83–80	(Germany) Fraport Skyliners
Scoring by quarter: 20–13, 16–21, 19–22, 28–24
Pts: Watson 18; Rebs: Milošević 10; Asts: Watson 6		Pts: Voigtmann 21; Rebs: Voigtmann 11; Asts: Cobbs 4

Hayri Gür Arena, Trabzon
Attendance: 3,000
Referees: Georgios Poursanidis (GRE), Fernando Calatrava Cuevas (ESP), Rain Peerandi (EST)

== Final ==
The game was won by JSF Nanterre on a buzzer-beating lay-up from Terrance Campbell, that was reviewed by using instant replay.

26 April 2015
19:00

Boxscore

Trabzonspor Medical Park (Turkey)	63–64	(France) JSF Nanterre
Scoring by quarter: 17–19, 11–18, 19–16, 16–11
Pts: Hardy 16; Rebs: Veličković 7 Asts: Hardy 6		Pts: Campbell 15; Rebs: Jaiteh 7 Asts: 3 players 3

Hayri Gür Arena, Trabzon
Attendance: 7,500
Referees: Neil Wilkinson (ENG), Manuel Mazzoni (ITA), Milan Nedovic (SLO)

Trabzonspor	Nanterre

Starters:			Pts	Reb	Ast
PG	3	(United States) Dee Bost	9	2	1
SG	7	(United States) Dwight Hardy	16	1	6
SF	19	(Turkey) Alper Saruhan	0	0	0
PF	12	(Serbia) Novica Veličković	13	7	3
C	13	(Bosnia and Herzegovina) Andrija Stipanović	10	5	1
Reserves:					
G	20	(Turkey) Can Altıntığ	3	1	0
F	23	(United States) Sean Marshall	5	4	4
F	55	(Bulgaria) Kaloyan Ivanov	7	3	0
G	10	(Turkey) Yunus Akcay	0	0	0
C	9	(Turkey) Hasan Yigit Seckin	DNP		
F	21	(Turkey) Nusret Yıldırım	DNP		
G	8	(Turkey) Can Korkmaz	DNP		
Head coach:
(Bosnia and Herzegovina) Nenad Marković

Game rules

Game played with FIBA rules.

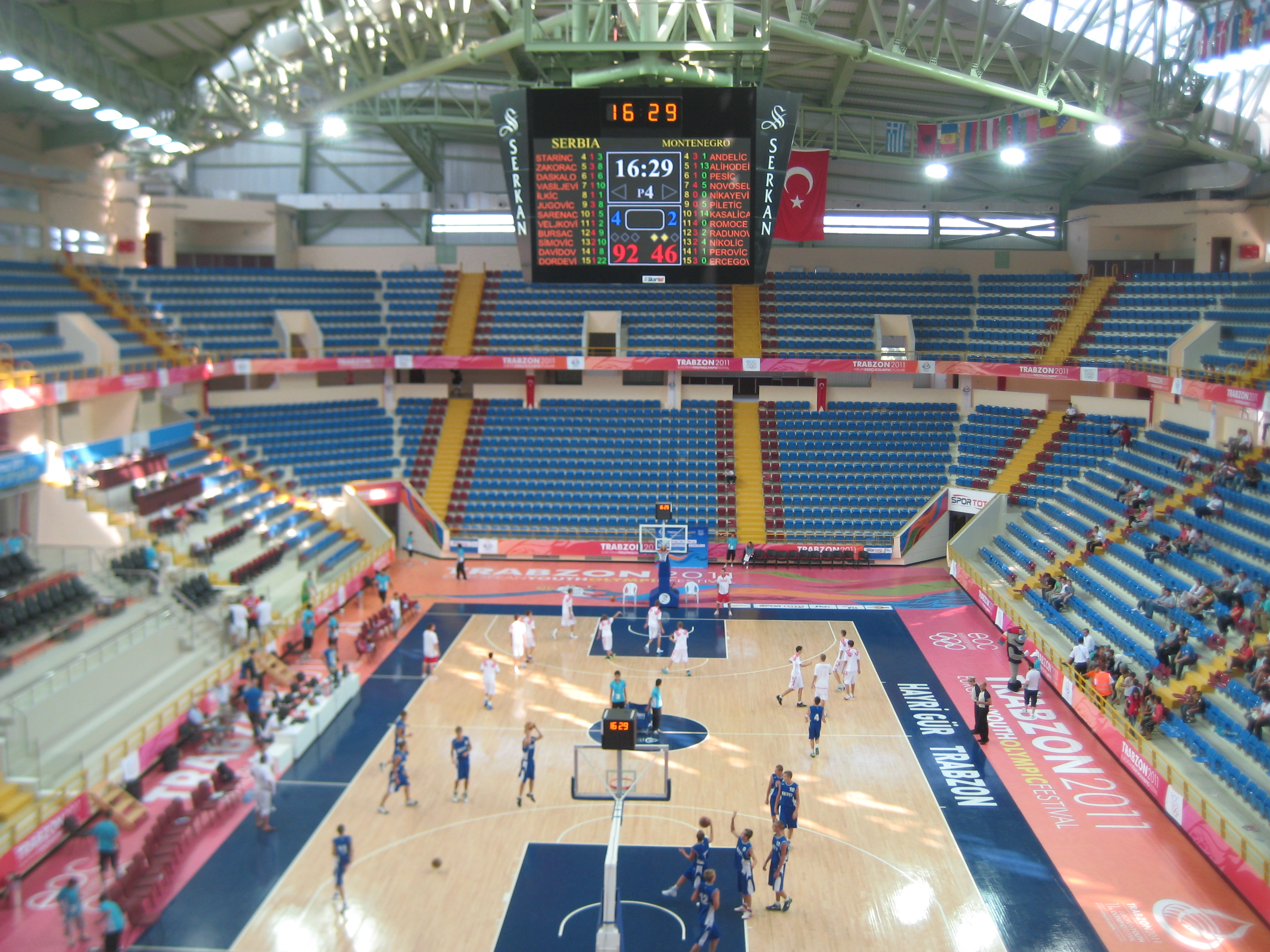
Hayri Gür Arena

Starters:			P	R	A
PG	1	(United States) Jamal Shuler	10	3	2
SG	44	(United States) Terrance Campbell	15	1	3
SF	9	(Cameroon) Jérémy Nzeulie	14	3	3
PF	34	(United States) Kyle Weems	8	5	3
C	14	(France) Mouhammadou Jaiteh	6	7	0
Reserves:			P	R	A
G	3	(France) Joseph Gomis	7	3	1
G	5	(France) Marc Judith	2	1	0
F	21	(United Kingdom) Laurence Ekperigin	0	4	1
C	42	(France) Johan Passave-Ducteil	2	4	1
G	93	(France) William Mensah	DNP		
SF	24	(United States) Mykal Riley	DNP		
Head coach:
(France) Pascal Donnadieu
