= 2014–15 EuroChallenge Group B =

Basketball tournament group stage

Group B of the 2014–15 EuroChallenge consisted of EGIS Körmend, CS Energia Târgu Jiu, Tartu University Rock, and Lukoil Academic. Play began on 4 November and ended on 16 December 2014.

== Teams ==
Draw seed	Team	City	Country	Last appearance	2013–14			Arena	Capacity
Draw seed	Team	City	Country	Last appearance	League	Pos.	Playoffs	Arena	Capacity
I	Tartu University Rock	Tartu	Estonia	2013–14	KML	2nd	RU	Sporthall of Tartu University	3,000
II	EGIS Körmend	Körmend	Hungary	2013–14	NB I/A	8th	QF	Szentély Aréna	1,800
III	CS Energia Târgu Jiu	Târgu Jiu	Romania	—N/a	Liga națională	8th	QF	Sala Sporturilor	1,500
IV	Lukoil Academic	Sofia	Bulgaria	2010–11	NBL	1st	RU	Armeets Arena	12,395

== Standings ==
Pos	Team	Pld	W	L	PF	PA	PD	Pts	TAR	ROV	KÖR	LUK
1	(Estonia) Tartu University Rock (Q)	6	4	2	428	420	+8	10		66–59	81–83	71–59
2	(Romania) Energia Rovinari (Q)	6	3	3	428	435	−7	9 (Note: Because the head-to-head record and point differential between Energia and Körmend were identical, point differential during the regular season was the tie-breaker. (ROV: –7 PD; KOR: –13 PD))	74–56		73–72	72–67
3	(Hungary) EGIS Körmend	6	3	3	447	460	−13	9	72–79	77–76		63–76
4	(Bulgaria) Lukoil Academic	6	2	4	447	435	+12	8	73–75	97–74	75–80	

(Q) Qualify for Top 16

== Statistical leaders ==
	(Bulgaria) Lukoil Academic	(Estonia) Tartu University Rock	(Hungary) EGIS Körmend	(Romania) Energia Târgu Jiu
PPG	(United States) Charles Thomas (18.8)	(Estonia) Janar Talts (13.3)	(England) Ryan Richards (20.7)	(United States) Giordan Watson (14.3)
RPG	(Croatia) Bruno Šundov (7.7)	(Estonia) Janar Talts (7.0)	(England) Ryan Richards (7.8)	(Montenegro) Nemanja Milosevic (8.3)
APG	(United States) Sharaud Curry (5.7)	(Estonia) Tanel Kurbas (3.0)	(United States) Walter Lemon (3.8)	(United States) Giordan Watson (4.2)
