= 2015 TBL Playoffs =

Turkish Basketball League playoff round

TBL Playoffs
- Season: 2014–15
- Dates: 20 May – 19 June 2015
- Games played: 24
- Teams: 8

Finals
- Champions: Pınar Karşıyaka (2nd title)
- Runners-up: Anadolu Efes
- Semi-finalists: Fenerbahçe Ülker; Trabzonspor Medical Park
- Finals MVP: (United States) Bobby Dixon
- All statistics correct as of 16 May 2019.

2015 TBL Playoffs was the final phase of the 2014–15 Turkish Basketball League. The playoffs started on 20 May 2014. Fenerbahçe Ülker were the defending champions.

The eight highest placed teams of the regular season qualified for the playoffs. In the quarter-finals a best-of-three was played, in the semi-finals a best-of-five and in the finals a best-of-seven playoff format was used.

Pınar Karşıyaka competed against Anadolu Efes in the finals, won the series 4-2 and got their 2nd championship.

== Bracket ==
Quarterfinals
1	Fenerbahçe Ülker	2
8	Galatasaray Liv Hospital	1
4	Pınar Karşıyaka	2
5	Banvit	1
2	Anadolu Efes	2
7	Türk Telekom	1
3	Darüşşafaka Doğuş	0
6	Trabzonspor Medical Park	2

Semifinals
1	Fenerbahçe Ülker	1
4	Pınar Karşıyaka	3
2	Anadolu Efes	3
6	Trabzonspor Medical Park	0

Finals
4	Pınar Karşıyaka	4
2	Anadolu Efes	1

== Quarterfinals ==
=== Fenerbahçe Ülker vs. Galatasaray Liv Hospital ===
May 21, 2015
21:00 EEST

Report

Fenerbahçe Ülker	93–67	Galatasaray Liv Hospital
Scoring by quarter: 29–16, 23–19, 23–16, 18–16
Pts: Bogdanović 15; Rebs: Bjelica 11; Asts: Goudelock 4		Pts: Young 15; Rebs: Carter 5 Asts: Micov, Güler 4
1-0

Ülker Sports Arena, Istanbul
Referees: Mehmet Keseratar, Yener Yılmaz, Ozan Çakar

May 24, 2015
16:00 EEST

Report

Galatasaray Liv Hospital	70–69 (OT)	Fenerbahçe Ülker
Scoring by quarter: 18–14, 14–16, 19–14, 12–19, Overtime: 7–6
Pts: Güler 20; Rebs: Erceg 6 Asts: Micov, Güler 4		Pts: Bogdanović 13; Rebs: Bjelica 12; Asts: Goudelock 3
1-1

Abdi İpekçi Arena, Istanbul
Referees: Fatih Söylemezoğlu, Engin Kennerman, Alper Özgök

May 27, 2015
21:00 EEST

Report

Fenerbahçe Ülker	67–59	Galatasaray Liv Hospital
Scoring by quarter: 14–15, 22–11, 16–14, 15–19
Pts: Mahmutoğlu 18; Rebs: Veselý 9 Asts: Four players 2		Pts: Young 18; Rebs: Young 13; Asts: Güler 6
Fenerbahçe Ülker wins series 2-1

Ülker Sports Arena, Istanbul
Referees: Emin Moğulkoç, Aytuğ Ekti, Serkan Emlek

=== Anadolu Efes vs. Türk Telekom ===
May 20, 2015
20:00 EEST

Report

Anadolu Efes	88–71	Türk Telekom
Scoring by quarter: 19–21, 19–14, 27–20, 23–16
Pts: Šarić, Janning 17; Rebs: Šarić, Heurtel 9 Asts: Heurtel 8		Pts: McCauley 14; Rebs: McCauley 8 Asts: Valters 5
1-0

Abdi İpekçi Arena, Istanbul
Referees: Recep Ankaralı, Ersan Ergüler, Serhat Büker

May 23, 2015
16:00 EEST

Report

Türk Telekom	88–83	Anadolu Efes
Scoring by quarter: 28–17, 16–22, 18–23, 26–21
Pts: Johnson 22; Rebs: McCauley 8 Asts: Ermiş 8		Pts: Krstić 22; Rebs: Krstić 9 Asts: Šarić 5
1-1

Ankara Arena, Ankara
Referees: Zafer Yılmaz, Ziya Özorhon, Ali Şakacı

May 26, 2015
20:00 EEST

Report

Anadolu Efes	93–75	Türk Telekom
Scoring by quarter: 29–17, 24–19, 20–21, 20–18
Pts: Osman 20; Rebs: Lasme 7 Asts: Heurtel 8		Pts: Carter 14; Rebs: Johnson 7 Asts: Ermiş 4
Anadolu Efes wins series 2-1

Abdi İpekçi Arena, Istanbul
Referees: Mehmet Keseratar, Yener Yılmaz, Serdar Ünal

=== Darüşşafaka Doğuş vs. Trabzonspor Medical Park ===
May 20, 2015
18:45 EEST

Report

Darüşşafaka Doğuş	76–79 (OT)	Trabzonspor Medical Park
Scoring by quarter: 16–21, 16–15, 19–19, 14–10, Overtime: 11–14
Pts: Farmar 17; Rebs: Brown 8 Asts: Gordon 5		Pts: Stipanović 20; Rebs: Veličković, Ivanov 10; Asts: Hardy 6
0-1

Ayhan Şahenk Arena, Istanbul
Referees: Emin Moğulkoç, Altuğ Köselerli, Kerem Baki

May 23, 2015
18:30 EEST

Report

Trabzonspor Medical Park	78–71	Darüşşafaka Doğuş
Scoring by quarter: 22–19, 20–21, 14–15, 22–16
Pts: Veličković, Marshall 21; Rebs: Veličković 13; Asts: Hardy 5		Pts: Farmar 22; Rebs: Brown 9 Asts: Gordon 8
Trabzonspor Medical Park wins series 2-0

Hayri Gür Arena, Trabzon
Referees: Murat Biricik, Kaan Büyükçil, Sinan İşgüder

=== Pınar Karşıyaka vs. Banvit ===
May 21, 2015
20:00 EEST

Report

Pınar Karşıyaka	87–79	Banvit
Scoring by quarter: 17–24, 28–10, 16–25, 26–20
Pts: Palacios 19; Rebs: Gabriel 7 Asts: Dixon 8		Pts: Rowland 28; Rebs: Simmons 6 Asts: Mejia 4
1-0

Karşıyaka Arena, İzmir
Referees: Aytuğ Ekti, Serkan Emlek, Serdar Ünal

May 24, 2015
18:30 EEST

Report

Banvit	70–66	Pınar Karşıyaka
Scoring by quarter: 18–19, 15–11, 19–18, 18–18
Pts: Mejia 16; Rebs: Davis 11; Asts: Davis 6		Pts: Diebler 17; Rebs: Gabriel 7 Asts: Dixon 6
1-1

Kara Ali Acar Sport Hall, Bandırma
Referees: Mehmet Keseratar, Halil Baldemir, Fatih Arslanoğlu

May 27, 2015
18:45 EEST

Report

Pınar Karşıyaka	90–79	Banvit
Scoring by quarter: 35–15, 19–22, 23–15, 13–27
Pts: Gabriel 24; Rebs: Four players 6 Asts: Strawberry 7		Pts: Baron 15; Rebs: Simmons, Dragičević 5 Asts: Three players 3
Pınar Karşıyaka wins series 2-1

Karşıyaka Arena, İzmir
Referees: Recep Ankaralı, Zafer Yılmaz, Kaan Büyükçil

== Semifinals ==
=== Fenerbahçe Ülker vs. Pınar Karşıyaka ===
May 30, 2015
21:30 EEST

Report

Fenerbahçe Ülker	96–97 (OT)	Pınar Karşıyaka
Scoring by quarter: 14–22, 22–29, 19–13, 30–21, Overtime: 11–12
Pts: Goudelock 25; Rebs: Veselý 8 Asts: Bogdanović 6		Pts: Dixon 27; Rebs: Hersek 7 Asts: Strawberry 6
0-1

Ülker Sports Arena, Istanbul
Referees: Fatih Söylemezoğlu, Engin Kennerman, Sinan İşgüder

June 1, 2015
20:00 EEST

Report

Fenerbahçe Ülker	84–70	Pınar Karşıyaka
Scoring by quarter: 24–17, 21–20, 23–14, 16–19
Pts: Bjelica 16; Rebs: Bjelica, Preldžić 7 Asts: Bjelica, Zisis 5		Pts: Strawberry 23; Rebs: Gabriel 7 Asts: Dixon 3
1-1

Ülker Sports Arena, Istanbul
Referees: Mehmet Keseratar, Murat Biricik, Yener Yılmaz

June 4, 2015
19:30 EEST

Report

Pınar Karşıyaka	84–83 ()	Fenerbahçe Ülker
Scoring by quarter: 17–16, 22–13, 19–20, 18–27, Overtime: 9–8
Pts: Diebler 19; Rebs: Palacios 11; Asts: Strawberry 7		Pts: Bogdanović 20; Rebs: Preldžić 7 Asts: Zisis 5
2-1

Karşıyaka Arena, İzmir
Referees: Recep Ankaralı, Zafer Yılmaz, Ziya Özorhon

June 6, 2015
18:00 EEST

Report

Pınar Karşıyaka	82–64	Fenerbahçe Ülker
Scoring by quarter: 20–11, 21–19, 16–15, 25–19
Pts: Dixon 24; Rebs: Nalga 7 Asts: Dixon 6		Pts: Bjelica 14; Rebs: Bjelica 10; Asts: Bogdanović 5
Pınar Karşıyaka wins series 3-1

Karşıyaka Arena, İzmir
Referees: Emin Moğulkoç, Aytuğ Ekti, Fatih Arslanoğlu

=== Anadolu Efes vs. Trabzonspor Medical Park ===
May 29, 2015
20:00 EEST

Report

Anadolu Efes	85–56	Trabzonspor Medical Park
Scoring by quarter: 18–12, 23–12, 14–16, 30–16
Pts: Batuk 14; Rebs: Osman, Šarić 8 Asts: Šarić 5		Pts: Hardy 19; Rebs: Ivanov 7 Asts: Hardy, Altıntığ 3
1-0

Abdi İpekçi Arena, Istanbul
Referees: Emin Moğulkoç, Zafer Yılmaz, Ersan Ergüler

May 31, 2015
16:00 EEST

Report

Anadolu Efes	77–59	Trabzonspor Medical Park
Scoring by quarter: 21–16, 16–20, 22–10, 18–13
Pts: Janning 15; Rebs: Krstić 10; Asts: Balbay 6		Pts: Marshall 11; Rebs: Ivanov 10; Asts: Altıntığ 4
2-0

Abdi İpekçi Arena, Istanbul
Referees: Recep Ankaralı, Serkan Emlek, Altuğ Köselerli

June 3, 2015
19:30 EEST

Report

Trabzonspor Medical Park	54–59	Anadolu Efes
Scoring by quarter: 14–8, 15–16, 8–22, 17–13
Pts: Veličković 14; Rebs: Stipanović 11; Asts: Bost, Stipanović 3		Pts: Lasme 24; Rebs: Lasme 12; Asts: Heurtel 5
Anadolu Efes wins series 3-0

Hayri Gür Arena, Trabzon
Referees: Mehmet Keseratar, Murat Biricik, Kaan Büyükçil

== Finals ==
=== Anadolu Efes vs. Pınar Karşıyaka ===
June 9, 2015
20:00 EEST

Report

Anadolu Efes	95–92 ()	Pınar Karşıyaka
Scoring by quarter: 19–28, 29–22, 18–14, 15–17, Overtime: 14–11
Pts: Heurtel 25; Rebs: Šarić 14; Asts: Perperoglou, Janning 3		Pts: Dixon 26; Rebs: Dixon, Strawberry 7 Asts: Dixon 5
1-0

Abdi İpekçi Arena, Istanbul
Referees: Engin Kennerman, Recep Ankaralı, Serdar Ünal

June 11, 2015
20:00 EEST

Report

Anadolu Efes	85–86	Pınar Karşıyaka
Scoring by quarter: 23–22, 21–24, 19–23, 22–17
Pts: Krstić 16; Rebs: Šarić, Janning 6 Asts: Heurtel 12		Pts: Dixon 28; Rebs: Gabriel 13; Asts: Dixon 6
1-1

Abdi İpekçi Arena, Istanbul
Referees: Emin Moğulkoç, Serkan Emlek, Sinan İşgüder

June 14, 2015
18:00 EEST

Report

Pınar Karşıyaka	71–65	Anadolu Efes
Scoring by quarter: 18–18, 17–21, 20–12, 16–14
Pts: Strawberry 26; Rebs: Palacios 10; Asts: Dixon 4		Pts: Šarić 13; Rebs: Šarić 11; Asts: Šarić 4
2-1

Karşıyaka Arena, İzmir
Referees: Murat Biricik, Aytuğ Ekti, Kaan Büyükçil

June 16, 2015
20:00 EEST

Report

Pınar Karşıyaka	91–88 ()	Anadolu Efes
Scoring by quarter: 17–17, 18–20, 19–32, 28–13, Overtime: 9–6
Pts: Dixon 24; Rebs: Strawberry 9 Asts: Gabriel 3		Pts: Perperoglou 21; Rebs: Osman, Lasme 7 Asts: Osman 6
3-1

Karşıyaka Arena, İzmir
Referees: Mehmet Keseratar, Zafer Yılmaz, Yener Yılmaz

June 19, 2015
20:00 EEST

Report

Anadolu Efes	71–85	Pınar Karşıyaka
Scoring by quarter: 24–24, 14–17, 12–26, 21–18
Pts: Perperoglou 18; Rebs: Šarić 8 Asts: Heurtel 4		Pts: Palacios 22; Rebs: Palacios 10; Asts: Strawberry 5
Pınar Karşıyaka wins series 4-1

Abdi İpekçi Arena, Istanbul
Referees: Recep Ankaralı, Fatih Arslanoğlu, Sinan İşgüder

2015 TBL Champions
Pınar Karşıyaka
2nd Title
