= 2014–15 EuroChallenge Quarterfinals =

The 2014–15 EuroChallenge Quarterfinals were played in a best-of-three Playoffs format. Teams who were group winners in the Top 16 had home court advantage. Play began on 10 March 2015 and ended on 17 March 2015.

== Summary ==
The quarterfinals were played in a best-of-three playoff format. Teams that finished first in their top 16 group played the first and third leg at home. Matchdays were on 10 March, 12 March and 17 March 2015.

Team 1	Series	Team 2	Game 1	Game 2	Game 3
Energia Târgu Jiu (Romania)	2–1	(France) Le Mans Sarthe	84–60	68–79	79–64
JSF Nanterre (France)	2–0	(Italy) Enel Brindisi	80–68	77–72	
Fraport Skyliners (Germany)	2–1	(Russia) Enisey	77–74	68–78	85–80
Trabzonspor Medical Park (Turkey)	2–0	(Russia) Avtodor Saratov	94–88	100–73	

== Energia Târgu Jiu – Le Mans Sarthe ==
10 March 2015

Energia Târgu Jiu (Romania)	84–60	(France) Le Mans Sarthe

12 March 2015

Le Mans Sarthe (France)	79–68	(Romania) Energia Târgu Jiu

17 March 2015

Energia Târgu Jiu (Romania)	79–64	(France) Le Mans Sarthe

== JSF Nanterre – Enel Brindisi ==
10 March 2015
20:30

Report

JSF Nanterre (France)	80–68	(Italy) Enel Brindisi
Scoring by quarter: 17–17, 25–20, 18–15, 20–16
Pts: Shuler 17; Rebs: Riley, Weems 8 Asts: Campbell 6		Pts: Denmon 17; Rebs: James 9 Asts: Denmon 4

Nanterre, France
Attendance: 1,500

Enel Brindisi (Italy)	72–77	(France) JSF Nanterre
Nanterre wins the series 2–0

== Fraport Skyliners – Enisey Krasnoyarsk ==
10 March 2015
19:30

Report

Fraport Skyliners (Germany)	77–74	(Russia) Enisey Krasnoyarsk
Scoring by quarter: 13–22, 20–14, 24–22, 20–16
Pts: Cobbs 20; Rebs: Cobbs 6 Asts: Cobbs 9		Pts: Kikanovic 16; Rebs: Lesic 7 Asts: Cooper 11

Frankfurt, Germany
Attendance: 1,080

Enisey Krasnoyarsk (Russia)	78–68	(Germany) Fraport Skyliners

17 March 2015

Fraport Skyliners (Germany)	85–80	(Russia) Enisey Krasnoyarsk
Fraport Skyliners wins the series 2–1

Frankfurt, Germany

== Trabzonspor Medical Park – Avtodor Saratov ==
10 March 2015
19:00

Report

Trabzonspor Medical Park (Turkey)	94–88	(Russia) Avtodor Saratov
Scoring by quarter: 23–15, 26–27, 23–27, 22–19
Pts: Velickovic 25; Rebs: Stipanovic 11; Asts: Bost 6		Pts: Fortson 22; Rebs: Fesenko 11; Asts: Fortson 8

Trabzon, Turkey
Attendance: 2,561

12 March 2015
19:00

Report

Avtodor Saratov (Russia)	73–100	(Turkey) Trabzonspor Medical Park
Scoring by quarter: 17–23, 6–28, 23–30, 27–19
Pts: Fesenko 17; Rebs: Fesenko 10; Asts: Fortson 11		Pts: Bost 17; Rebs: Stipanovic 7 Asts: Stipanovic 6
Trabzonspor Medical Park wins the series 2–0

Saratov, Russia
Attendance: 2,000
