= Vlastimir Vukadinović =

Serbian basketball coach

Personal information
- Born: February 13, 1982 (age 44) Belgrade, SR Serbia, SFR Yugoslavia

Career history

Coaching
- 2012–2014: CS Concordia Chiajna

Vlastimir Vukadinović (Serbian Cyrillic: Властимир Вукадиновић; born February 13, 1982) is a Serbian professional basketball coach.

== Career ==
He is known for leading the CS Concordia Chiajna to promotion to the Romanian League in 2013 for the first time in club's history. The team won 21 out of 24 games played in 2nd-tier Liga I throughout 2012–13 season, without losing on home court, thereby gaining promotion. He is also the third youngest coach ever in Romanian basketball to lead a team to the first division. He started the 2013–14 season as the sporting director of the team, but in the sixth round returned to the bench. One week later he managed to gain the club's first win in the history of the first league, 75–71 against BC Timba Timișoara.
