= Tal Karpelesz =

Israeli-Romanian basketball player

Tal Karpelesz טל קרפלס
Hapoel Kfar Kasem
- Position: Shooting guard / small forward
- League: Liga Artzit

Personal information
- Born: February 25, 1990 (age 36) Rehovot, Israel
- Listed height: 1.94 m (6 ft 4 in)

Career information
- NBA draft: 2012: undrafted
- Playing career: 2007–present

Career history
- 2007–2011: Maccabi Rishon LeZion
- 2009–2011: →Elitzur Yavne
- 2011–2013: Ironi Nes Ziona
- 2013–2015: Energia Rovinari
- 2015–2016: Ironi Nes Ziona
- 2016–2019: Hapoel Gilboa Galil
- 2019–present: Hapoel Kfar Kasem

Career highlights
- Israeli National League champion (2013); Romanian Cup winner (2014); Romanian League All-Star (2015)

Tal Karpelesz (Hebrew: טל קרפלס; born February 25, 1990) is an Israeli-Romanian professional basketball player for Hapoel Kfar Kasem of the Liga Artzit. Standing at 6 ft 4 in (1.93 m), he primarily plays at the small forward position.

== Early life ==
Karpelesz was born in Rehovot, Israel. He played for Maccabi Rishon LeZion youth team.

== Professional career ==
=== Early years (2007–2011) ===
In 2007, Karpelesz started his professional career with Maccabi Rishon LeZion. On November 30, 2008, he made his professional debut in a match against Hapoel Gilboa Galil.

In 2009, Karpelesz was loaned to Elitzur Yavne of the Liga Leumit, where he averaged 11 points, 2.7 rebounds, 2.2 assists and 1.6 steals per game.

=== Ironi Nes Ziona (2011–2013) ===
In 2011, Karpelesz joined Ironi Nes Ziona. On April 26, 2013, Karpelesz recorded a career-high 26 points, shooting 10-of-12 from the field, along with two rebounds, three assists and three steals in a 90–98 playoff loss to Hapoel Galil Elyon. In his second season with Nes Ziona, he averaged 12.7 points, 4.4 rebounds, 1.9 assists and 1.4 steals and helped the team to promote to the Israeli Premier League for the first time in their history.

=== Energia Rovinari (2013–2015) ===
On August 6, 2013, Karpelesz signed a one-year deal with the Romanian team Energia Rovinari after receiving a Romanian passport. In his first season with Rovinari, Karpelesz helped the team to win the 2014 Romanian Cup after a 58–55 win over CSM U Oradea.

On February 7, 2015, Karpelesz recorded a season-high 19 points, shooting 7-of-11 from the field, along with three rebounds and three assists in a 91–68 win over CS Universitatea Cluj. In 48 games played during the 2014–15 season (in both the Romanian League and the FIBA EuroChallenge), he averaged 7.2 points, 3.2 rebounds, 1.4 assists and 1.3 steals in 20.9 minutes per game. Karpelesz helped Rovinari reach the 2015 EuroChallenge Final Four, where they eventually finished in the third place.

=== Return to Nes Ziona (2015–2016) ===
On August 9, 2015, Karpelesz returned to Ironi Nes Ziona for a second stint, signing a two-year deal. On January 17, 2016, Karpelesz recorded a season-high 15 points, shooting 6-of-10 from the field, along with four assists and two steals in an 87–80 win over Hapoel Holon.

=== Hapoel Gilboa Galil (2016–2019) ===
On July 1, 2016, Karpelesz signed a one-year deal with Hapoel Gilboa Galil. However, on September 4, 2016, Karpelesz suffered an ACL injury during a practice and later was ruled out for the rest of the season.

On July 11, 2017, Karpelesz signed a one-year contract extension with Gilboa Galil. On May 30, 2018, Karpelesz recorded a season-high 16 points, shooting 5-of-6 from the field, along with eight rebounds in an 85–78 playoff win over Hapoel Jerusalem. Karpelesz helped Gilboa Galil reach the 2018 Israeli League Playoffs as the sixth seed, but they eventually lost to Hapoel Jerusalem in the Quarterfinals.

On July 15, 2018, Karpelesz signed a one-year contract extension with Gilboa Galil. In 19 games played during the 2018–19 season, he averaged 5.8 points and 2.5 rebounds per game.

=== Hapoel Kfar Kasem (2019–present) ===
On June 5, 2019, Karpelesz signed with Hapoel Kfar Kasem of the Liga Artzit.

== National team career ==
Karpelesz was a member of the U-18 and U-20 Israel national teams.
