= 2014–15 EuroChallenge Group I =

Basketball tournament group stage

Group I of the 2014–15 EuroChallenge is the first group of the Last 16 phase. It consisted of Enel Brindisi, Energia Târgu Jiu, Okapi Aalstar, and BC Astana. Play began on 13 January 2015 and will end on 24 February.

== Standings ==
Pos	Team	Pld	W	L	PF	PA	PD	Pts	Qualification	ENE	BRI	AST	OKA
1	(Romania) Energia Târgu Jiu	6	4	2	501	498	+3	10	Advance to quarterfinals	—	67–78	90–89	93–60
2	(Italy) Enel Brindisi	6	3	3	485	445	+40	9	Advance to quarterfinals	76–78	—	74–65	101–66
3	(Kazakhstan) Astana	6	3	3	512	509	+3	9		113–89	83–75	—	77–73
4	(Belgium) Okapi Aalstar	6	2	4	475	521	−46	8		82–84	86–81	108–85	—

Source: EuroChallenge
