= 2014–15 EuroChallenge Group K =

Basketball tournament group stage

Group J of the 2014–15 EuroChallenge was the third group of the Last 16 phase. It consisted of SPM Shoeters Den Bosch, Tartu University Rock, Avtodor Saratov, and Fraport Skyliners. Play began on 13 January 2015 and ended 24 February.

== Standings ==
Pos	Team	Pld	W	L	PF	PA	PD	Pts	Qualification	FRA	AVT	TAR	SPM
1	(Germany) Fraport Skyliners	6	5	1	512	471	+41	11	Advance to quarterfinals	—	68–71	92–73	75–70
2	(Russia) Avtodor Saratov	6	4	2	567	546	+21	10	Advance to quarterfinals	103–112	—	105–106	89–85
3	(Estonia) Tartu University Rock	6	2	4	457	501	−44	8		62–71	68–91	—	71–64
4	(Netherlands) SPM Shoeters Den Bosch	6	1	5	496	514	−18	7		92–94	107–108	78–77	—

Source: EuroChallenge
