= 2014–15 EuroChallenge Group L =

Basketball tournament group stage

Group L of the 2014–15 EuroChallenge was the third group of the Last 16 phase. It consisted of Enisey Krasnoyarsk, Port of Antwerp Giants, Trabzonspor Medical Park, and Belfius Mons-Hainaut. Play began on 13 January 2015 and ended 24 February.

== Standings ==
| Pos | Team | Pld | W | L | PF | PA | PD | Pts | Qualification | TS | ENI | ANT | BEL |
|---|---|---|---|---|---|---|---|---|---|---|---|---|---|
| 1 | (Turkey) Trabzonspor Medical Park | 6 | 5 | 1 | 502 | 456 | +46 | 11 | Advance to quarterfinals | — | 90–85 | 89–79 | 76–68 |
| 2 | (Russia) Enisey | 6 | 3 | 3 | 516 | 495 | +21 | 9 | Advance to quarterfinals | 96–82 | — | 85–86 | 83–88 |
| 3 | (Belgium) Port of Antwerp Giants | 6 | 3 | 3 | 481 | 509 | −28 | 9 | | 72–90 | 78–93 | — | 82–75 |
| 4 | (Belgium) Belfius Mons-Hainaut | 6 | 1 | 5 | 435 | 474 | −39 | 7 | | 56–75 | 71–74 | 77–84 | — |

Source: EuroChallenge
