= 2013–14 Liga Națională (men's basketball) =

Romanian men's basketball tournament

Liga Națională
- Duration: 5 October 2013 – 5 April 2014 (Regular season)
- Teams: 14
- TV partners: Digi Sport; TVR

Regular season
- Top seed: Asesoft Ploieşti
- Season MVP: (Ghana) Alhaji Mohammed

Finals
- Champions: Asesoft Ploieşti (10th title)
- Runners-up: CSM Oradea
- Semi-finalists: Mureș; U-Mobitelco BT Cluj

Statistical leaders
Points	(Serbia) Milos Bojovic	20.2
Rebounds	(Serbia) Aleksandar Vuletic	13.6
Assists	(Bosnia and Herzegovina) Zlatko Jovanovic	5.7

The 2013–14 Liga Națională season was the 64th season of the Liga Națională, the highest professional basketball league in Romania.

The first half of the season consisted of 14 teams and 182-game regular season (26 games for each of the 14 teams). The season began on 5 October 2013 and ended on 5 April 2014, just before the playoffs.

== Preview ==
The 2013–14 season had only 14 teams after CSS Giurgiu give up his place and CSM Bucuresti merge with new promoted team Steaua Bucharest resulting Steaua CSM EximBank Bucharest. Because of this situation no team will be relegated at the end of the season. Regarding the international competition SCM U Craiova will play in Balkan League (BIBL). CS Gaz Metan Medias, BC Mures and CSM Oradea would play in the EuroChallenge, and CSU Asesoft Ploiesti would play in the Eurocup.

== Teams ==
2013–14 Liga Națională club locations

Team	City	Arena	Capacity
BC Mures	Târgu Mureş	Sala Sporturilor Târgu Mureş	2000
CSA Steaua București	București	Sala Mihai Viteazu	300
Asesoft Ploieşti	Ploieşti	Olimpia Sports Hall	3500
Gaz Metan Mediaş	Mediaş	Sala Sporturilor Mediaş	461
U-Mobitelco BT Cluj	Cluj Napoca	Sala Sporturilor Horia Demian	2525
Farul Constanţa	Constanţa	Sala Sporturilor Constanţa	1500
BC Argeş Piteşti	Piteşti	Sala Sporturilor Trivale	2000
BC Timișoara	Timișoara	Constantin Jude Hall	2200
SCM Universitatea Craiova	Craiova	Sala Sporturilor Craiova	4215
CSM Oradea	Oradea	Arena Antonio Alexe	2000
CSU Atlassib Sibiu	Sibiu	Sala Transilvania	3000
CS Concordia Chiajna	Chiajna	Sala Sporturilor Chiajna	600
Timba Timișoara	Timișoara	Constantin Jude Hall	2200
Energia Rovinari	Târgu Jiu	Sala Sporturilor Târgu Jiu	1500

== Playoffs ==
Quarterfinals (Best of 5)
1	Asesoft Ploiești	3
8	Energia Rovinari	0
4	Sibiu	2
5	U-Mobitelco BT Cluj	3
3	Mureș	3
6	Pitești	1
2	Oradea	3
7	U Craiova	0

Semi-finals (Best of 5)
1	Asesoft Ploiești	3
5	U-Mobitelco BT Cluj	2
2	Oradea	3
3	Mureș	0

Finals (Best of 5)
1	Asesoft Ploiești	3
3	Oradea	2
