= Lamine Kanté =

French basketball player

Personal information
- Born: 11 February 1987 (age 39) Courbevoie, France
- Listed height: 6 ft 7 in (2.01 m)

Career information
- NBA draft: 2009: undrafted
- Playing career: 2007–2020
- Position: Small forward

Career history
- 2007–2010: Poitiers 86
- 2010–2011: SOMB Boulogne-sur-Mer
- 2011–2012: ASC Denain-Voltaire PH
- 2012–2013: Poitiers 86
- 2013–2014: Cholet
- 2014: Limoges CSP
- 2014–2015: Poitiers 86
- 2015–2016: AS Monaco

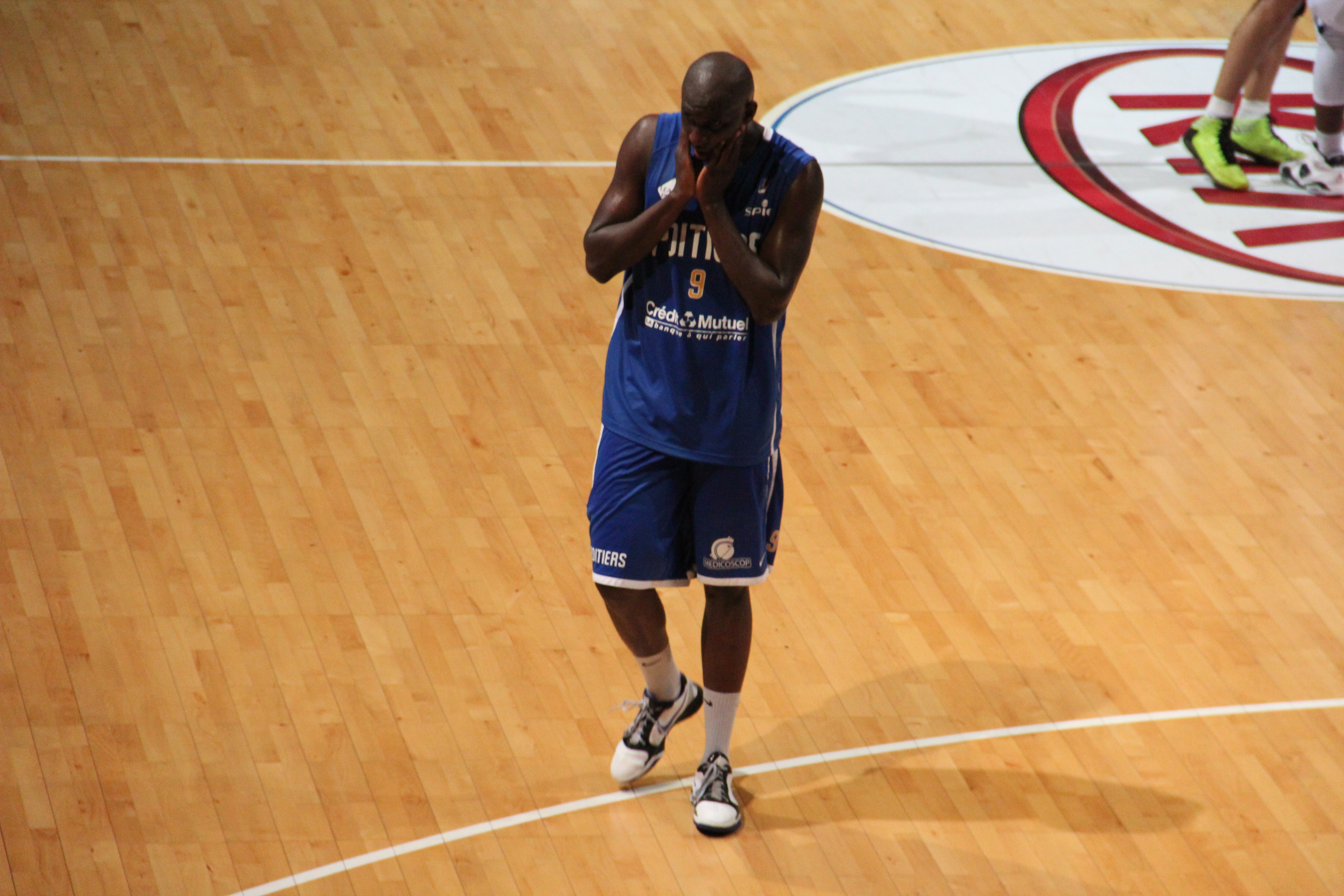
Lamine Kante (Poitiers, 9)

Lamine Kanté (born 11 February 1987) is a French former basketball player.
