= Sala Sporturilor (Constanța) =

Arena in Constanța, Romania

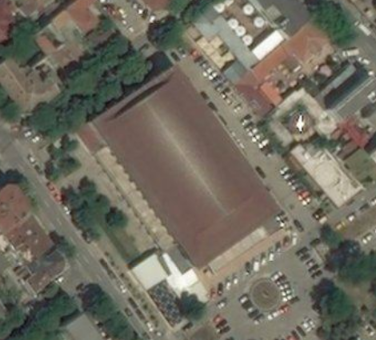
- Location: Constanța, Romania
- Owner: Municipality of Constanța
- Operator: Athletic Constanța
- Capacity: 1,500 (basketball)

Tenants
- BC Farul Constanța (2000–2014); Athletic Constanța (2007–present)

Sala Sporturilor is an indoor arena in Constanța, Romania. Its best known tenant is the men's basketball club Athletic Constanța.
