= Giordan Watson =

American-Romanian basketball player

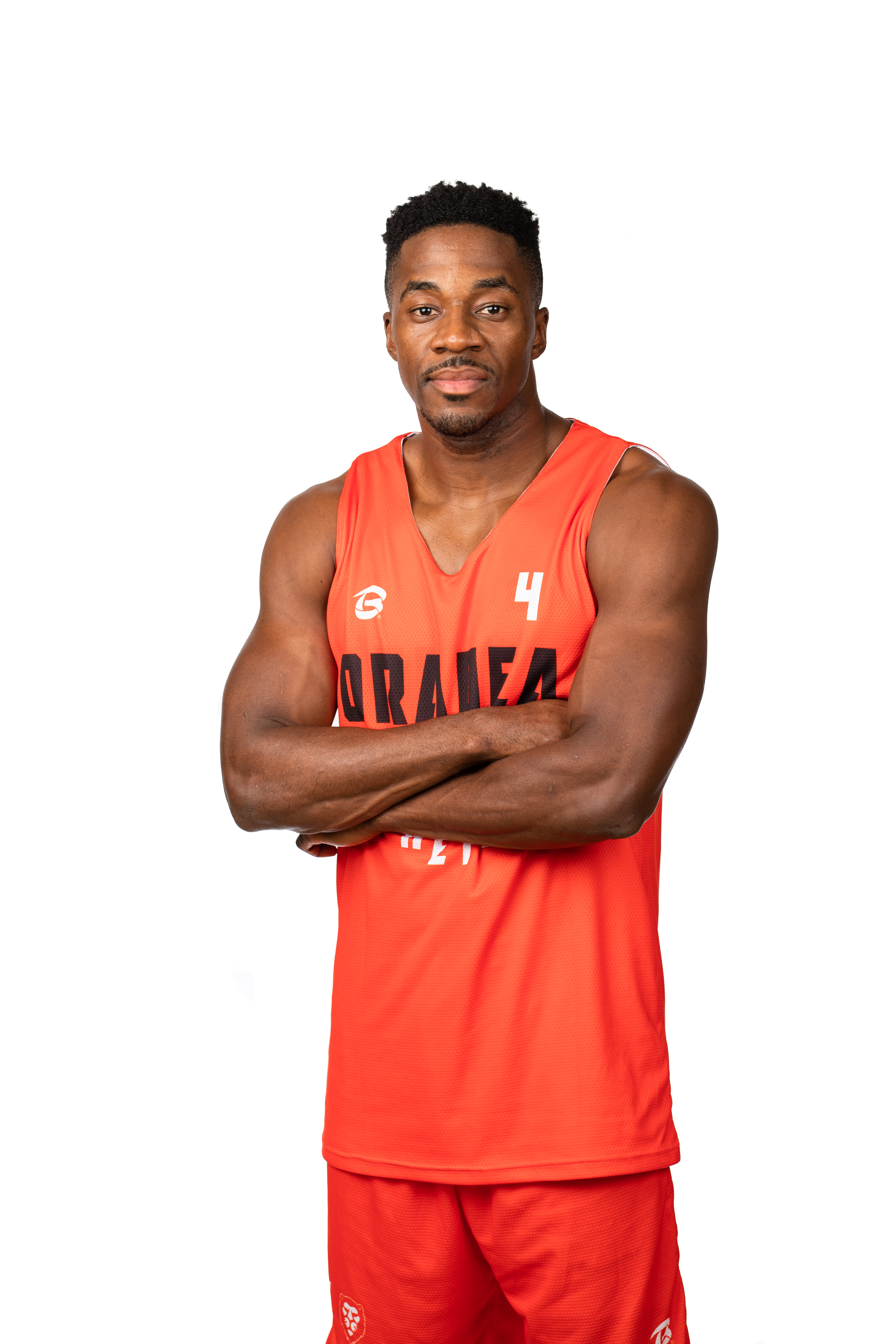

No. 2 – CSO Voluntari
- Position: Point guard
- League: Liga Națională

Personal information
- Born: 24 October 1985 (age 41) Detroit, Michigan, U.S.
- Listed height: 178 cm (5 ft 10 in)
- Listed weight: 80 kg (176 lb)

Career information
- High school: Birmingham Groves (Beverly Hills, Michigan)
- College: Central Michigan (2004–2008)
- NBA draft: 2008: undrafted
- Playing career: 2008–present

Career history
- 2008–2009: Eisbären Bremerhaven
- 2009–2010: Giants Nördlingen
- 2011: Njarðvík
- 2011–2012: Grindavík
- 2012–2013: Kauhajoki Karhu
- 2013–2015: Energia Târgu Jiu
- 2015–2016: Uşak Sportif
- 2016–2017: Le Mans
- 2017–2018: U-BT Cluj-Napoca
- 2018–2021: CSM Oradea
- 2021–2022: U-BT Cluj-Napoca
- 2022–2025: SCM Universitatea Craiova
- 2025–Present: CSO Voluntari

Career highlights
- 2× Romanian League winner (2020, 2022); Úrvalsdeild champion (2012); 2× Romanian Cup winner (2014, 2018); Romanian Super Cup winner (2020); Icelandic Super Cup winner (2011); Icelandic Company Cup winner (2011)

Giordan Watson (born 24 October 1985) is an American-Romanian professional basketball player for CSO Voluntari of the Liga Națională. Standing at 178 cm (5 ft 10 in), Watson primarily plays as point guard. A naturalized Romanian, he also plays for the Romanian national basketball team.

== Professional career ==
Watson spent the 2011–2012 season with Úrvalsdeild karla club Grindavík, helping them win the Icelandic Supercup, the Icelandic Company Cup, and the Icelandic championship.

On 27 June 2017, Watson signed with U-BT Cluj-Napoca of the Romanian Liga Națională. He signed with CSM Oradea in 2018. Watson averaged 11.3 points and 3.7 assists per game in 2019–20. He re-signed with the team on June 29, 2020.

On July 16, 2021, he has signed with U-BT Cluj-Napoca of the Romanian Liga Națională.

On June 26, 2025, he signed with CSO Voluntari of the Liga Națională.

== International career ==
In June 2017, Watson was selected for the first selection of players for the Romanian national basketball team, to play at EuroBasket 2017.
