= Taylor Brown (basketball) =

American basketball player (born 1989)

Personal information
- Born: August 4, 1989 (age 36) Atlanta, Georgia, U.S.
- Listed height: 2.00 m (6 ft 7 in)
- Listed weight: 95 kg (209 lb)

Career information
- High school: Dunwoody (Dunwoody, Georgia)
- College: Bradley (2008–2012)
- Position: Power forward

Career history
- 2013–2014: KFUM Nässjö
- 2014: Basic-Fit Brussels
- 2014–2015: Darüşşafaka S.K.
- 2015–2016: Halcones de Ciudad Obregón
- 2015–2016: Wilki Morskie Szczecin
- 2017: Lietuvos rytas Vilnius
- 2017: Halcones de Ciudad Obregón
- 2017–2018: Al-Ahli Jeddah
- 2018: Atlas Ferzol
- 2019: Al Wahda

Taylor Darnell Brown (born August 4, 1989) is an American former professional basketball player who played as power forward.

== Professional career ==
On February 25, 2017, Brown moved to Lietuvos rytas Vilnius by signing a 1+1 deal with Rytas paying buyout to the Polish team. On May 24, 2017, it was reported that Brown along with other American-born teammates Corey Fisher and Clevin Hannah were partying and consuming alcohol in Vilnius nightclubs right after losing the Game 3 of the LKL Playoffs on May 20. All of them were denying the fact but the incontestable pictures were published, which shattered all the doubts. The semi-final game was crucial as following it the series moved to Panevėžys, where Rytas lost the game and the series 1–3, resulting in second shocking fiasco during the same season for the club. On the same May 24, all three players were suspended from the team. On May 25, head coach Rimas Kurtinaitis said that it was not the first time when all three players were behaving unprofessionally and that they were ignoring previous warnings. Some witnesses noted that Taylor Brown previously was also consuming drugs. Not surprisingly, the team has shown no interest in keeping Brown for his second season and the contract was terminated by noting that character and devotion are essential properties for the players.

Brown joined Liga ACB side Real Betis Energía Plus on August 25, 2017. However, the deal was voided five days later after a failed physical.

== Personal life ==
He is the son of a former EuroLeague champion and NBA player Rickey Brown.
