= Marc Judith =

French basketball player

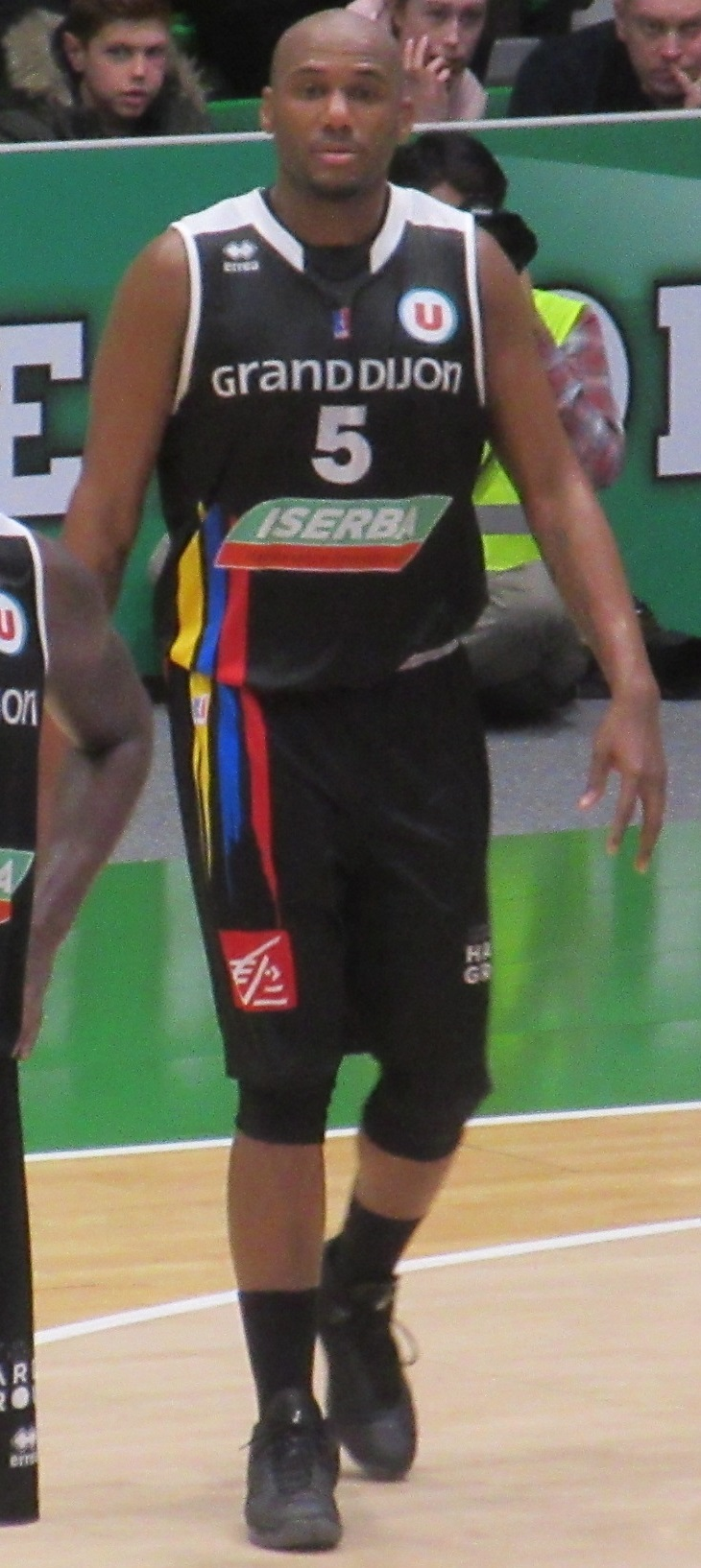

No. 5 – Orléans Loiret Basket
- Position: Small forward
- League: LNB Pro B

Personal information
- Born: January 19, 1987 (age 39) Saint-Claude, Guadeloupe
- Listed height: 6 ft 4 in (1.93 m)
- Listed weight: 205 lb (93 kg)

Career information
- NBA draft: 2009: undrafted
- Playing career: 2003–present

Career history
- 2003–2009: Challans
- 2009–2015: JSF Nanterre
- 2015–2017: JDA Dijon
- 2017–present: Orléans Loiret Basket

Career highlights
- Pro A champion (2013); French Cup winner (2014); Match des Champions champion (2014); EuroChallenge champion (2015)

Marc Judith (born January 19, 1987) is a French professional basketball player for Orléans Loiret Basket of LNB Pro B.

In 2011–12, Judith averaged 7.3 points, 3.4 rebounds and 2.2 assists per game for JSF Nanterre. After the season he extended his contract. In the 2014–15 season he posted 2.6 points and 2.1 rebounds per game with Nanterre. Judith signed with JDA Dijon in July 2015. Judith averaged 4 points and 1.8 rebounds per game in 2016–17. In June 2017 he signed a two-year deal with Orléans Loiret Basket.
