= 2014–15 EuroChallenge =

Transnational basketball competition

EuroChallenge
- Season: 2014–15
- Duration: 4 November 2014 – 26 April 2015
- Teams: 32

Finals
- Champions: (France) JSF Nanterre (1st title)
- Runners-up: (Turkey) Trabzonspor Medical Park
- Third place: (Romania) Energia Târgu Jiu
- Fourth place: (Germany) Fraport Skyliners
- Final Four MVP: (United States) Jamal Shuler

Statistical leaders
Points	(United States) Ryan Pearson	19.8
Rebounds	(Ukraine) Kyrylo Fesenko	10.1
Assists	(United States) Courtney Fortson	9.8

The 2014–15 EuroChallenge was the 12th and last edition of Europe's third-tier level transnational competition for men's professional basketball clubs. The winner and the runner-up of this competition earned a place at the group stage of next year's Eurocup season.

The regular season was composed by 32 teams and it started on 4 November 2014. The season ended on 26 April 2015, when JSF Nanterre beat Trabzonspor Medical Park 63–64 in the Final in Trabzon, Turkey.

It was the last season of the EuroChallenge, starting from the 2015–16 season, the competition was replaced by the FIBA Europe Cup.

== Competition format ==
As in the previous season, the 32 participants were divided into two conferences. Teams were divided into eight round-robin groups of four teams each for the regular season. The two best-placed teams qualified to the next phase of the competition.

== Teams ==
No qualification rounds were played, all teams entered the regular season. FIBA Europe announced the participants on 1 July 2014. One day later, Szolnoki Olaj and VEF Rīga were moved to 2014–15 Eurocup as a replacement of two withdrawals. Trabzonspor Medical Park and Enisey Krasnoyarsk replaced them in the EuroChallenge. The labels in the parentheses show how each team qualified for the place of its starting round. (TH: Title holder)

- 1st, 2nd, 3rd, 4th, 5th, etc.: League position after eventual playoffs

Regular season
(Belgium) Okapi Aalstar (2nd)	(Turkey) Uşak Sportif (7th)	(Germany) ratiopharm Ulm (7th)	(Kazakhstan) Astana (1st)
(Belgium) Belfius Mons-Hainaut (3rd)	(Turkey) Tofaş (8th)	(Germany) Fraport Skyliners (11th)	(Lithuania) Šiauliai (6th)
(Belgium) Port of Antwerp Giants (4th)	(Turkey) Trabzonspor Medical Park (9th)	(Russia) Enisey (6th)	(Denmark) Bakken Bears (1st)
(Romania) Oradea (2nd)	(France) Le Mans (5th)	(Russia) Avtodor (Note: Avtodor qualified as the winner of the Russian Basketball Super League, the second division of Russian basketball.) (1st)	(Belarus) Tsmoki-Minsk (1st)
(Romania) "U" Mobitelco Cluj-Napoca (3rd)	(France) JSF Nanterre (9th)	(Italy) Enel Brindisi (6th)	(Estonia) Tartu University Rock (2nd)
(Romania) Energia Târgu Jiu (8th)	(Hungary) Atomerőmű SE (2nd)	(Italy) Bonprix Biella (Note: Bonprix Biella finished in 4th place in the DNA Gold, the second division in Italian basketball.) (4th)	(Portugal) Benfica (1st)
(Finland) Kataja (2nd)	(Hungary) Egis Körmend (8th)	(Sweden) Södertälje Kings (1st)	(Bulgaria) Lukoil Academic (2nd)
(Finland) KTP (4th)	(Austria) magnofit Güssing Knights (1st)	(Sweden) Borås (3rd)	(Netherlands) SPM Shoeters Den Bosch (2nd)

== Draw ==
The draw for the regular season was held on 6 July in Munich, Germany.

The 32 clubs registered for this year's competition were divided into two conferences (1 and 2), based on broad geographical criteria. Teams from the same country could not be drawn against each other.

Conference 1
Seed 1	Seed 2	Seed 3	Seed 4
(Belgium) Port of Antwerp Giants (Belgium) Okapi Aalstar (Finland) Joensuun Kataja (Sweden) Södertälje Kings	(Finland) KTP-Basket (Denmark) Bakken Bears (Belgium) Belfius Mons-Hainaut (Netherlands) SPM Shoeters	(France) JSF Nanterre (France) Le Mans Sarthe (Germany) ratiopharm Ulm (Germany) Fraport Skyliners	(Italy) Enel Brindisi (Italy) Angelico Biella (Sweden) Borås Basket (Portugal) Benfica

Conference 2
Seed 1	Seed 2	Seed 3	Seed 4
(Belarus) Tsmoki-Minsk (Estonia) Tartu Ülikool/Rock (Turkey) Tofaş (Hungary) Atomerőmű	(Russia) Enisey Krasnoyarsk (Romania) CSM Oradea (Hungary) Körmend (Romania) "U" Mobitelco Cluj-Napoca	(Russia) Avtodor (Turkey) Uşak Sportif (Turkey) Trabzonspor Medical Park (Romania) Energia Târgu Jiu	(Austria) UBC Güssing Knights (Bulgaria) Lukoil Academic (Lithuania) Šiauliai (Kazakhstan) Astana

== Regular season ==
The 32 teams are drawn into eight groups of four. In each group, teams play against each other home-and-away in a round-robin format. The group winners and runners-up advance to the last 16, while the third-placed teams and fourth-placed teams are eliminated.

If teams in the same group finished tied on points at the end of the regular season, tiebreakers were applied in the following order:

1. Head-to-head record.
2. Head-to-head point differential.
3. Point differential during the regular season.
4. Points scored during the regular season.
5. Sum of quotients of points scored and points allowed in each regular season match.

=== Group A ===
Pos	Team	Pld	W	L	PF	PA	PD	Pts	Qualification	BRI	SPM	ULM	SÖD
1	(Italy) Enel Brindisi	6	5	1	496	400	+96	11	Advance to last 16	—	76–62	88–70	90–69
2	(Netherlands) SPM Shoeters Den Bosch	6	3	3	498	499	−1	9 (Note: SPM Shoeters Den Bosch 1–1 (+6) ratiopharm Ulm)	Advance to last 16	71–69	—	87–76	88–72
3	(Germany) ratiopharm Ulm	6	3	3	477	467	+10	9		76–77	91–82	—	88–62
4	(Sweden) Södertälje Kings	6	1	5	441	546	−105	7		52–96	115–108	71–76	—

Source: EuroChallenge

=== Group B ===
Pos	Team	Pld	W	L	PF	PA	PD	Pts	Qualification	TAR	ENE	KÖR	LUK
1	(Estonia) Tartu University Rock	6	4	2	428	420	+8	10	Advance to last 16	—	66–59	81–83	71–59
2	(Romania) Energia Târgu Jiu	6	3	3	428	435	−7	9 (Note: Energia Târgu Jiu win on point difference (-7 vs -13) vs Egis Körmend)	Advance to last 16	74–56	—	73–72	72–67
3	(Hungary) Egis Körmend	6	3	3	447	460	−13	9		72–79	77–76	—	63–76
4	(Bulgaria) Lukoil Academic	6	2	4	447	435	+12	8		73–75	97–74	75–80	—

Source: EuroChallenge

=== Group C ===
Pos	Team	Pld	W	L	PF	PA	PD	Pts	Qualification	OKA	FRA	BOR	BAK
1	(Belgium) Okapi Aalstar	6	5	1	557	507	+50	11	Advance to last 16	—	94–59	119–118	103–100
2	(Germany) Fraport Skyliners	6	4	2	464	421	+43	10	Advance to last 16	80–58	—	70–72	74–64
3	(Sweden) Borås	6	3	3	505	516	−11	9		83–92	61–94	—	90–70
4	(Denmark) Bakken Bears	6	0	6	457	539	−82	6		83–92	61–94	79–86	—

Source: EuroChallenge

=== Group D ===
Pos	Team	Pld	W	L	PF	PA	PD	Pts	Qualification	AVT	AST	TOF	ORA
1	(Russia) Avtodor	6	5	1	530	438	+92	11	Advance to last 16	—	83–75	80–75	92–73
2	(Kazakhstan) Astana	6	5	1	492	461	+31	11	Advance to last 16	75–73	—	73–65	80–64
3	(Turkey) Tofaş	6	2	4	469	504	−35	8		66–101	102–104	—	84–75
4	(Romania) Oradea	6	0	6	429	517	−88	6		74–101	74–83	69–77	—

Source: EuroChallenge

=== Group E ===
Pos	Team	Pld	W	L	PF	PA	PD	Pts	Qualification	NAN	BEL	SLB	KAT
1	(France) JSF Nanterre	6	5	1	529	478	+51	11	Advance to last 16	—	88–68	80–68	102–92
2	(Belgium) Belfius Mons-Hainaut	6	5	1	489	451	+38	11	Advance to last 16	94–86	—	92–63	71–62
3	(Portugal) Benfica	6	2	4	486	519	−33	8		86–96	86–96	—	107–82
4	(Finland) Kataja	6	0	6	479	535	−56	6		70–77	83–85	90–93	—

Source: EuroChallenge

=== Group F ===
Pos	Team	Pld	W	L	PF	PA	PD	Pts	Qualification	TS	GÜS	UMO	ASE
1	(Turkey) Trabzonspor Medical Park	6	6	0	514	450	+64	12	Advance to last 16	—	80–72	91–72	103–81
2	(Austria) magnofit Güssing Knights	6	4	2	477	456	+21	10	Advance to last 16	67–77	—	84–77	93–84
3	(Romania) "U" Mobitelco Cluj-Napoca	6	1	5	442	478	−36	7		80–81	68–81	—	64–73
4	(Hungary) Atomerőmű SE	6	1	5	454	503	−49	7		78–82	70–80	68–81	—

Source: EuroChallenge

=== Group G ===
Pos	Team	Pld	W	L	GF	GA	GD	Pts	Qualification	MSB	ANT	BIE	KTP
1	(France) Le Mans	6	5	1	478	414	+64	11	Advance to last 16	—	72–66	88–74	71–52
2	(Belgium) Port of Antwerp Giants	6	3	3	542	514	+28	9	Advance to last 16	78–87	—	92–82	98–83
3	(Italy) Bonprix Biella	6	3	3	511	525	−14	9		82–64	97–96	—	81–77
4	(Finland) KTP	6	1	5	475	553	−78	7		62–96	93–112	108–95	—

Source: EuroChallenge

=== Group H ===
Pos	Team	Pld	W	L	PF	PA	PD	Pts	Qualification	ENI	UŞA	ŠIA	TSM
1	(Russia) Enisey	6	4	2	515	467	+48	10	Advance to last 16	—	95–79	86–68	87–82
2	(Turkey) Uşak Sportif	6	3	3	445	458	−13	9	Advance to last 16	69–84	—	79–69	78–59
3	(Lithuania) Šiauliai	6	3	3	493	515	−22	9		93–92	75–78	—	83–80
4	(Belarus) Tsmoki-Minsk	6	2	4	473	486	−13	8		76–71	85–73	91–94	—

Source: EuroChallenge

== Last 16 ==
The sixteen teams were divided in four groups of four. In each group, teams play against each other home-and-away in a round-robin format. The group winners and runners-up advance to the quarterfinals, while the third-placed teams and fourth-placed teams are eliminated.

=== Group I ===
Pos	Team	Pld	W	L	PF	PA	PD	Pts	Qualification	ENE	BRI	AST	OKA
1	(Romania) Energia Târgu Jiu	6	4	2	501	498	+3	10	Advance to quarterfinals	—	67–78	90–89	93–60
2	(Italy) Enel Brindisi	6	3	3	485	445	+40	9	Advance to quarterfinals	76–78	—	74–65	101–66
3	(Kazakhstan) Astana	6	3	3	512	509	+3	9		113–89	83–75	—	77–73
4	(Belgium) Okapi Aalstar	6	2	4	475	521	−46	8		82–84	86–81	108–85	—

Source: EuroChallenge

=== Group J ===
Pos	Team	Pld	W	L	PF	PA	PD	Pts	Qualification	NAN	MSB	GÜS	USA
1	(France) JSF Nanterre	6	4	2	487	434	+53	10	Advance to quarterfinals	—	85–68	89–86	100–67
2	(France) Le Mans	6	4	2	464	429	+35	10	Advance to quarterfinals	72–60	—	93–60	84–63
3	(Austria) magnofit Güssing Knights	6	2	4	458	471	−13	8		62–82	82–65	—	91–63
4	(Turkey) Uşak Sportif	6	2	4	430	505	−75	8		79–71	79–82	79–77	—

Source: EuroChallenge

=== Group K ===
Pos	Team	Pld	W	L	PF	PA	PD	Pts	Qualification	FRA	AVT	TAR	SPM
1	(Germany) Fraport Skyliners	6	5	1	512	471	+41	11	Advance to quarterfinals	—	68–71	92–73	75–70
2	(Russia) Avtodor Saratov	6	4	2	567	546	+21	10	Advance to quarterfinals	103–112	—	105–106	89–85
3	(Estonia) Tartu University Rock	6	2	4	457	501	−44	8		62–71	68–91	—	71–64
4	(Netherlands) SPM Shoeters Den Bosch	6	1	5	496	514	−18	7		92–94	107–108	78–77	—

Source: EuroChallenge

=== Group L ===
Pos	Team	Pld	W	L	PF	PA	PD	Pts	Qualification	TS	ENI	ANT	BEL
1	(Turkey) Trabzonspor Medical Park	6	5	1	502	456	+46	11	Advance to quarterfinals	—	90–85	89–79	76–68
2	(Russia) Enisey	6	3	3	516	495	+21	9	Advance to quarterfinals	96–82	—	85–86	83–88
3	(Belgium) Port of Antwerp Giants	6	3	3	481	509	−28	9		72–90	78–93	—	82–75
4	(Belgium) Belfius Mons-Hainaut	6	1	5	435	474	−39	7		56–75	71–74	77–84	—

Source: EuroChallenge

== Quarterfinals ==
The quarterfinals were played in a best-of-three playoff format. Teams that finished first in their top 16 group played the first and third leg at home. Matchdays were on 10 March, 12 March and 17 March 2015.

Team 1	Series	Team 2	Game 1	Game 2	Game 3
Energia Târgu Jiu (Romania)	2–1	(France) Le Mans Sarthe	84–60	68–79	79–64
JSF Nanterre (France)	2–0	(Italy) Enel Brindisi	80–68	77–72	
Fraport Skyliners (Germany)	2–1	(Russia) Enisey	77–74	68–78	85–80
Trabzonspor Medical Park (Turkey)	2–0	(Russia) Avtodor Saratov	94–88	100–73	

== Final Four ==
The 2015 Final Four was played on 24 April and 26 April 2015 at Hayri Gür Arena, Trabzon, Turkey.

Semifinals; 24 April
(Romania) Energia Târgu Jiu	63
(Turkey) Trabzonspor MP	83
(France) JSF Nanterre	84
(Germany) Fraport Skyliners	79

Final; 26 April
(Turkey) Trabzonspor MP	63
(France) JSF Nanterre	64
Third place game
(Romania) Energia Târgu Jiu	83
(Germany) Fraport Skyliners	80

== Awards ==
=== Final Four MVP ===
- (United States) Jamal Shuler (JSF Nanterre)

=== Top Statistical Performer ===
Each round a Weekly MVP is chosen, determined by the Performance Index Rating (PIR) system.

==== Regular season ====
Week	Player	Team	PIR
1	(United States) Sean Marshall	(Turkey) Trabzonspor	33
2	(United States) J'Covan Brown	(Kazakhstan) Astana	36
3	(United States) LaMonte Ulmer	(Finland) KTP	34
4	(Sweden) Christian Maråker	(Sweden) Borås	39
5	(United States) Travis Peterson	(Russia) Avtodor	35
6	(Netherlands) Stefan Wessels	(Netherlands) SPM Shoeters	43

==== Last 16 ====
Week	Player	Team	PIR
1	(United States) Kyle Weems	(France) JSF Nanterre	39
2	(Kazakhstan) Jerry Johnson	(Kazakhstan) Astana	37
3	(United States) Travis Taylor	(Austria) Güssing Knights	32
4	(Azerbaijan) Nik Caner-Medley	(Kazakhstan) Astana	28
5	(United States) Courtney Fortson	(Russia) Avtodor	42
6	(United States) DeAndre Kane	(Belgium) Antwerp Giants	37
6	(United States) Quantez Robertson	(Germany) Fraport Skyliners	37

==== Quarterfinals ====
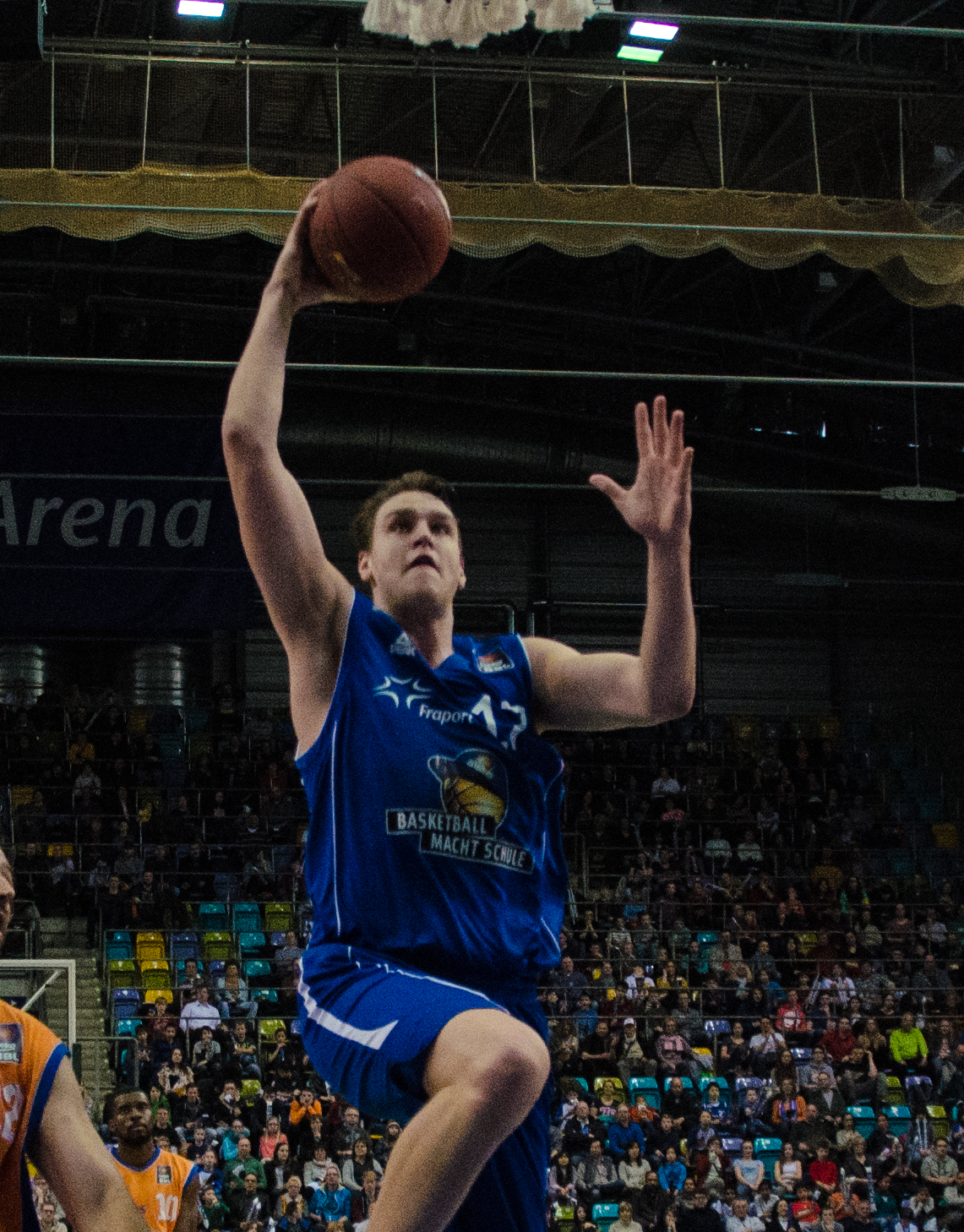
Johannes Voigtmann was the Round 3 MVP

Week	Player	Team	PIR
1	(Montenegro) Nemanja Milosevic	(Romania) Energia Târgu Jiu	33
2	(Ukraine) Kyrylo Fesenko	(Russia) Avtodor	22
2	(United States) Mykal Riley	(France) JSF Nanterre	22
2	(United States) Terrico White	(Russia) Enisey Krasnoyarsk	22
3	(Germany) Johannes Voigtmann	(Germany) Fraport Skyliners	33

== Individual statistics ==
To be included in the top rankings in individual statistics, a player had to have a minimum of 9 games played.

=== Points ===
Pos.	Player	Team	GP	PPG
1	(United States) Ryan Pearson	(Belgium) Antwerp Giants	12	19.8
2	(United States) Dwight Hardy	(Turkey) Trabzonspor	16	18.1
3	(United States) J'Covan Brown	(Kazakhstan) Astana	10	17.5

=== Rebounds ===
Pos.	Player	Team	GP	RPG
1	(Ukraine) Kyrylo Fesenko	(Russia) Avtodor	11	10.1
2	(United States) Travis Taylor	(Austria) Güssing Knights	12	10.1
3	(Serbia) Nemanja Milosevic	(Romania) Energia	17	8.5

=== Assists ===
Pos.	Player	Team	GP	APG
1	(United States) Courtney Fortson	(Russia) Avtodor	13	9.8
2	(United States) D.J. Cooper	(Russia) Enisey	15	7.9
3	(Kazakhstan) Jerry Johnson	(Kazakhstan) Astana	10	7.0

=== Season highs ===
	Statistic	Player	Team
Points	42	(United States) Robert Arnold	(Finland) Kataja
Rebounds	20	(Sweden) Christian Maråker	(Sweden) Borås
Assists	16	(Finland) Teemu Rannikko	(Finland) Kataja
Steals	7	(United States) Terrico White	(Russia) Enisey
Blocks	6	(France) Dounia Issa	(France) Le Mans Sarthe
Three-point field goals	8	(United States) Benjamin Raymond	(Italy) Bonprix Biella
Three-point field goals	8	(Netherlands) Kees Akerboom, Jr.	(Netherlands) SPM Shoeters

== See also ==
- 2014–15 Euroleague
- 2014–15 Eurocup Basketball
