= CS BC Farul Constanța =

BC Farul Constanța
- Nickname: Marinarii (The Sailors); Rechinii (The Sharks)
- Founded: 2000
- Dissolved: 2014
- Arena: Sala Sporturilor
- Capacity: 1,500
- Location: Constanța, Romania
- Team colors: Blue and White
Home	Away

CS BC Farul Constanța was a Romanian professional basketball club, based in Constanța, Romania. After a few years of financial trouble, BC Farul withdrew from the championship and was dissolved in the summer of 2014. After the dissolution of BC Farul, Athletic Constanța has remained the main basketball team in Constanța.
