= Ben McCauley =

American basketball player (born 1986)

Personal information
- Born: September 6, 1986 (age 40) West Newton, Pennsylvania, U.S.
- Listed height: 6 ft 9 in (2.06 m)
- Listed weight: 235 lb (107 kg)

Career information
- High school: Yough (Westmoreland County, Pennsylvania)
- College: NC State (2005–2009)
- NBA draft: 2009: undrafted
- Playing career: 2009–2022
- Position: Power forward
- Number: 34

Career history
- 2009–2010: Strasbourg
- 2010–2011: Belfius Mons-Hainaut
- 2011–2012: Chorale Roanne Basket
- 2012: Fort Wayne Mad Ants
- 2012–2013: SKS Starogard Gdański
- 2013–2014: BC Donetsk
- 2014: CAI Zaragoza
- 2014–2015: Türk Telekom
- 2015–2017: İstanbul BB
- 2018: Maccabi Ashdod
- 2019: Wilki Morskie Szczecin
- 2020: Brujos de Guayama
- 2021: Śląsk Wrocław
- 2021–2022: Brujos de Guayama

Benjamin Joseph McCauley (born September 6, 1986) is an American retired professional basketball player He played college basketball for North Carolina State University's Wolfpack before playing professionally in France, Belgium, Poland, Ukraine, Spain, Turkey, Puerto Rico and Israel.

== Early life and college career ==
McCauley attended Yough Senior High School in Westmoreland County, Pennsylvania. He played college basketball for North Carolina State University's Wolfpack.

In his senior year at NC State, McCauley played 30 games and averaged 12.4 points, 7.8 rebounds and 2 assists per game.

== Professional career ==
On March 7, 2011, McCauley signed with the French team Chorale Roanne Basket for the rest of the season.

On July 16, 2012, McCauley signed with the Polish team SKS Starogard Gdański for the 2012–13 season. On January 6, 2013, McCauley recorded a career-high 34 points, shooting 11-of-17 from the field, along with eight rebounds and two steals in an 85–81 win over Czarni Słupsk. In 30 games played during the 2012–13 season, McCauley averaged 18.8 points, 7.7 rebounds, 2 assists and 1 steal per game, shooting 42.9 percent from 3-point range.

On July 7, 2013, McCauley signed with the Ukrainian team BC Donetsk for the 2013–14 season. However, on March 24, 2014, McCauley parted ways with Donetsk to join the Spanish team CAI Zaragoza for the rest of the season, as a replacement for Joseph Jones.

On July 12, 2014, McCauley signed a one-year deal with the Turkish team Türk Telekom.

On February 19, 2018, McCauley signed with the Israeli team Maccabi Ashdod for the rest of the season as a replacement for David Laury. On April 1, 2018, McCauley recorded a season-high 19 points, shooting 8-of-11, along with ten rebounds in an 82–78 win over Bnei Herzliya. McCauley helped Ashdod reach the 2018 Israeli League Playoffs, where they eventually lost to Hapoel Tel Aviv. In 20 games played for Ashdod, McCauley averaged 9.7 points, 5.6 rebounds and 1.3 assist per game, shooting 41.9 percent from 3-point range.

On June 11, 2019, McCauley returned to Poland for a second stint, joining Wilki Morskie Szczecin.

On January 6, 2021, he has signed with Śląsk Wrocław of the PLK.

In the summer of 2021, McCauley returned to Brujos de Guayama. In the 2021–22 season, he averaged 15.8 points, 8.0 rebounds, and 3.2 assists in 25 games played. On June 22, 2022, in the final game of his professional career, McCauley scored 26 points in a losing effort against the Vaqueros de Bayamón.

As of February 2023, McCauley has retired.
