= Terrance Campbell =

American basketball player (born 1988)

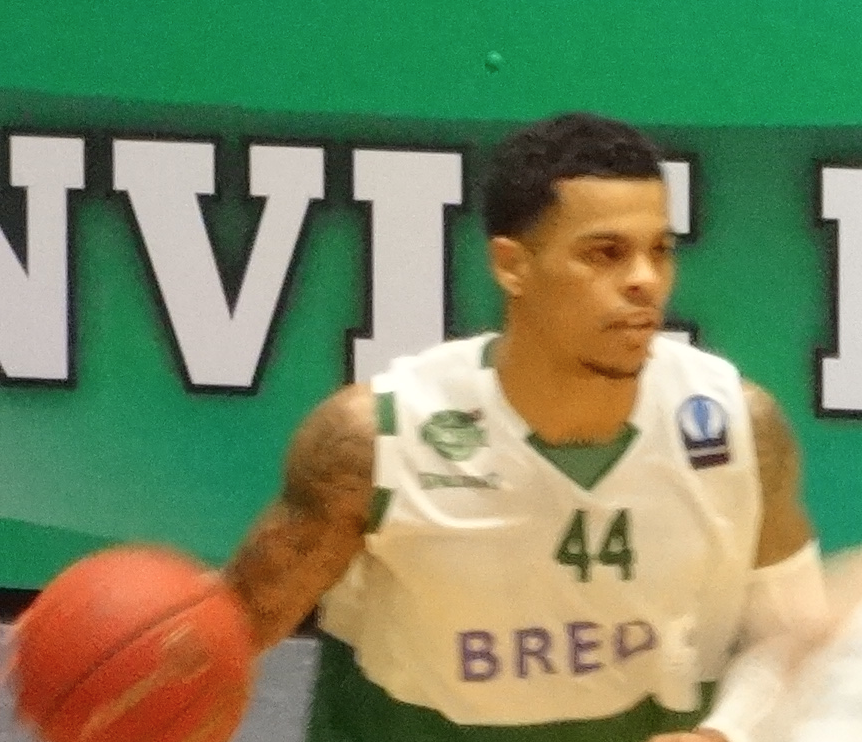

No. 44 – Soles de Mexicali
- Position: Point guard
- League: LNBP

Personal information
- Born: January 23, 1988 (age 38) Phoenix, Arizona, U.S.
- Listed height: 5 ft 9 in (1.75 m)
- Listed weight: 190 lb (86 kg)

Career information
- High school: Sunnyslope (Phoenix, Arizona)
- College: Glendale CC (2006–2008); Portland (2008–2010)
- NBA draft: 2010: undrafted
- Playing career: 2010–present

Career history
- 2010: Melbourne Tigers
- 2011: TED Ankara Kolejliler
- 2011–2012: Canton Charge
- 2012–2014: JDA Dijon
- 2014–2016: JSF Nanterre
- 2016–2017: Socar Petkim
- 2017–2020: Türk Telekom
- 2020–2021: Real Betis
- 2021: Afyon Belediye
- 2021–2026: Cholet Basket
- 2026–present: Soles de Mexicali

Career highlights
- EuroChallenge champion (2015); Turkish First League champion (2018)

Terrance Orlando "T. J." Campbell Jr. (born January 23, 1988) is an American professional basketball player for Soles de Mexicali of Liga Nacional de Baloncesto Profesional (LNBP). He played college basketball for the Portland Pilots.

== Professional career ==
In July 2010, he signed with the Melbourne Tigers. In November 2010, he was released by the Melbourne. In February 2011, he signed with TED Ankara Kolejliler for the rest of the season.

In November 2011, he joined the Canton Charge of the NBA D-League for the 2011–12 season.

On August 12, 2012, he signed a one-year deal with JDA Dijon. On June 29, 2013, he re-signed with Dijon for one more season.

On June 9, 2014, he signed with JSF Nanterre. On April 26, 2015, he scored a buzzer-beating lay-up to win the Final of the 2015 EuroChallenge Final 64–65. On July 8, 2015, he re-signed with Nanterre for one more season.

On July 12, 2016, he signed with Socar Petkim of the Turkish Basketball First League.

On July 4, 2017, he signed with Türk Telekom of the Turkish Basketball Super League. Campbell played three seasons for the team, averaging 12.2 points, 2.1 rebounds and 3.5 assists per game in his final season.

On August 6, 2020, he signed with Coosur Real Betis of the Liga ACB.

On August 19, 2021, he has signed with Afyon Belediye of the Turkish Basketbol Süper Ligi (BSL).
