= Jamal Shuler =

American basketball player

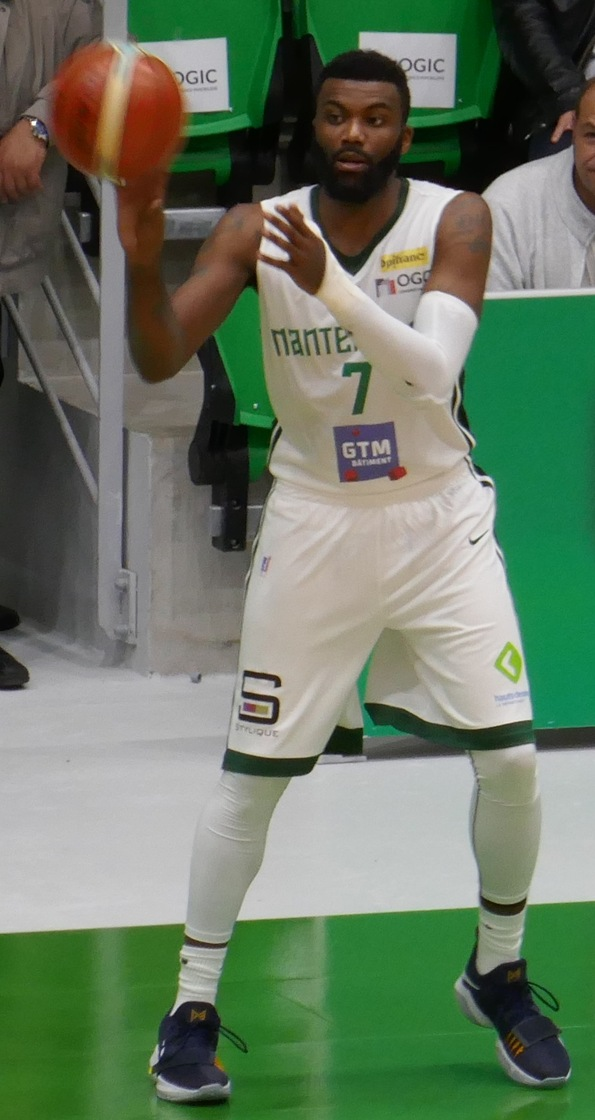
- Shuler with Nanterre in 2017

Personal information
- Born: January 11, 1986 (age 40) Jacksonville, North Carolina, U.S.
- Listed height: 1.91 m (6 ft 3 in)
- Listed weight: 91 kg (201 lb)

Career information
- High school: Jacksonville (Jacksonville, North Carolina)
- College: VCU (2004–2008)
- NBA draft: 2008: undrafted
- Playing career: 2008–2021
- Position: Shooting guard

Career history
- 2008–2010: TBB Trier
- 2010–2011: JA Vichy
- 2011–2013: SLUC Nancy
- 2013–2014: Khimik
- 2014–2015: Nanterre
- 2015–2017: AS Monaco
- 2017–2018: Nanterre
- 2018–2019: Hapoel Tel Aviv
- 2019–2020: Iraklis Thessaloniki
- 2020–2021: Aris Thessaloniki

Career highlights
- FIBA EuroChallenge champion (2015); FIBA EuroChallenge Final Four MVP (2015); 2× French League Cup winner (2016, 2017); French League Cup MVP (2016); 3× French Supercup winner (2011, 2014, 2017); All-French League First Team (2016); First-team All-CAA (2008); CAA All-Defensive Team (2008)

Jamal Shuler (born January 11, 1986) is an American former professional basketball player. He played college basketball for Virginia Commonwealth University (VCU) before playing professionally in Germany, France, Ukraine and Israel. Shuler was named EuroChallenge Final Four MVP in 2015.

== Early life and college career ==
Shuler attended Jacksonville High School in Jacksonville, North Carolina. He played college basketball for Virginia Commonwealth University's Rams.

In his senior year at VCU, he averaged 15.5 points, 4.6 rebounds, 1.2 assists and 1.5 steals per game, shooting 41.3 percent from 3-point range.

On March 6, 2008, Shuler earned a spot in the 2008 CAA All-First Team and All-Defensive Team.

== Professional career ==
=== TBB Trier (2008–2010) ===
After going undrafted in the 2008 NBA draft, Shuler started his professional career with TBB Trier of the BBL.

On June 2, 2009, Shuler re-signed with Trier for one more season. On January 23, 2010, Shuler won the Slam Dunk Contest during the 2010 BBL All-Star Game Event. On February 28, 2010, Shuler recorded a career-high 39 points, shooting 11-of-22 from the field, along with ten rebounds and five assists in a 98–101 overtime loss to Paderborn Baskets.

=== Vichy (2010–2011) ===
On July 9, 2010, Shuler signed a one-year deal with the French team JA Vichy. On January 29, 2011, Shuler recorded a season-high 35 points, shooting 7-of-12 from 3-point range, along with seven rebounds and three assists in a 76–74 win over CSP Limoges.

In 30 games played for Vichy, he averaged 16 points, 3.3 rebounds, 3.1 assists and 1.3 steals per game.

=== Nancy (2011–2013) ===
On June 27, 2011, Shuler signed with SLUC Nancy for the 2011–12 season. Shuler won the 2011 French Supercup title win Nancy.

On July 6, 2012, Shuler re-signed with Nancy for one more season.

=== Khimik (2013–2014) ===
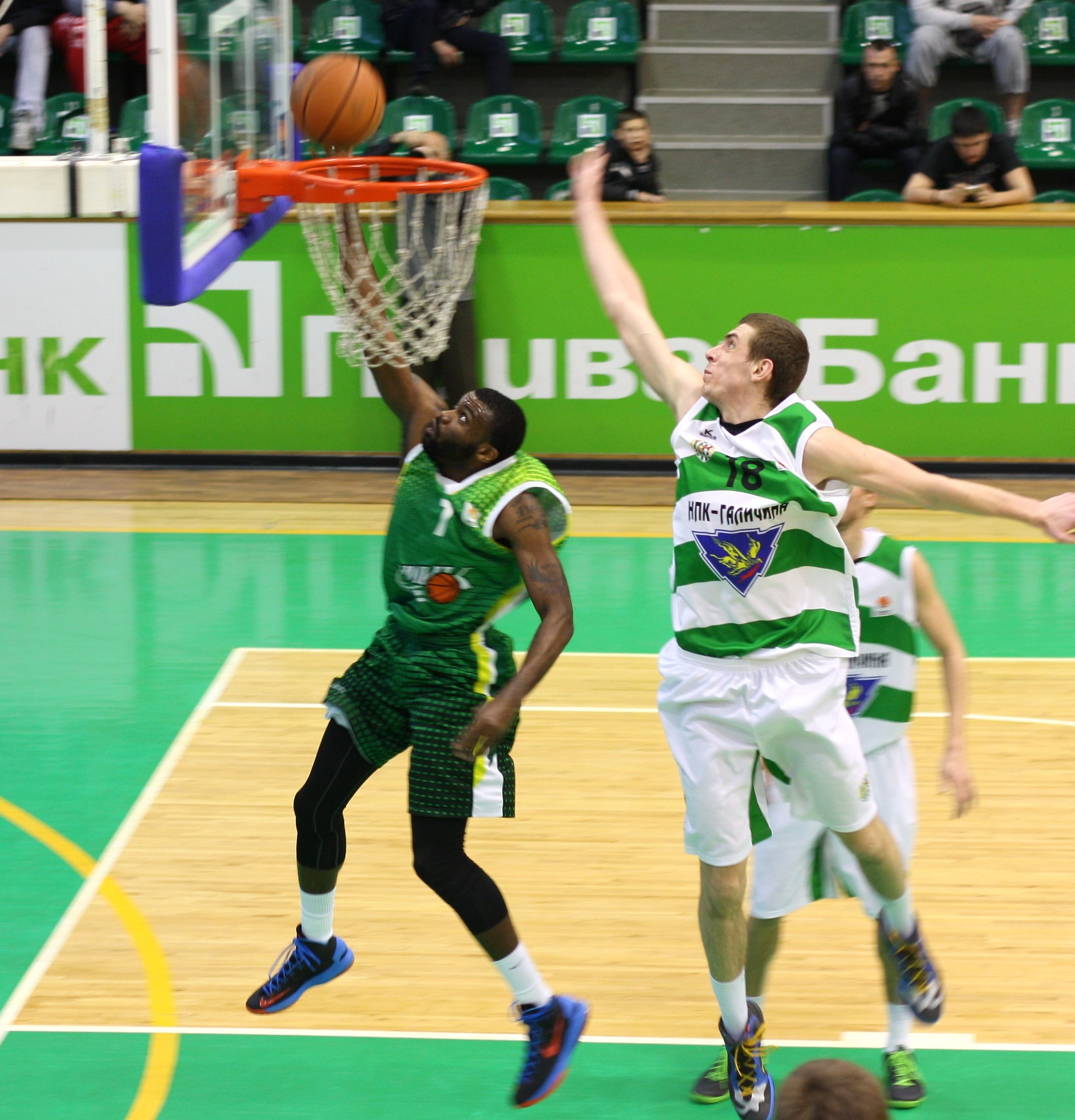
Shuler (left) with Khimik, 2014

On August 6, 2013, Shuler signed a one-year deal with the Ukrainian team Khimik. On April 27, 2014, Shuler recorded a season-high 32 points, shooting 12-of-21 from the field, along with three rebounds, two assists and three steals in a 91–79 win over Donetsk.

Shuler helped Khimik reach the 2014 Eurocup Round of 16, where they eventually lost to TED Ankara. In 51 games played for Khimik, he averaged 12.7 points, 4.3 rebounds, 3.3 assists and 1.1 steals per game.

=== Nanterre (2014–2015) ===
On July 17, 2014, Shuler returned to France for a second stint, signing a one-year deal with JSF Nanterre. Shuler led Nanterre to win the 2015 EuroChallenge, he completed the tournament averaging 14 points, 3.8 rebounds, 2.7 assists and a team-best 1.7 steals per game. Shuler was named the Final Four MVP.

=== Monaco (2015–2017) ===
On July 17, 2015, Shuler signed a one-year deal with AS Monaco Basket. On February 21, 2016, Shuler recorded 31 points, along with six rebounds and three assists and led Monaco to win the 2016 French Leaders Cup after a 99–74 victory over Élan Chalon. He was subsequently named the Tournament MVP.

In 43 games played during the 2015–16 season, Shuler averaged 15.9 points, 3.8 rebounds, 2.9 assists and 1.1 steals per game. On April 30, 2016, Shuler earned a spot in the All-French League First-team.

On June 9, 2016, Shuler re-signed with Monaco for one more season. Shuler went on to win the 2017 French Leaders Cup for two years in a row, as well as reaching the 2017 Champions League Final Four, where they eventually lost to Banvit.

=== Return to Nanterre (2017–2018) ===
On August 21, 2017, Shuler returned to Nanterre 92 for a second stint. On December 20, 2017, Shuler recorded 23 points, along with nine assists and three rebounds in a 106–102 win over Sidigas Avellino. He was subsequently named Champions League Gameday 9 MVP. Shuler won the 2017 French Supercup title with Nanterre.

=== Hapoel Tel Aviv (2018–2019) ===
On August 14, 2018, Shuler signed a one-year deal with the Israeli team Hapoel Tel Aviv, joining his former teammate Alade Aminu. In 36 Israeli League games played for Hapoel, he averaged 10.6 points, 2.6 rebounds, 2.3 assists and 1 steal per game. Shuler helped the team reach the 2019 Israeli League Playoffs, where they eventually were eliminated by Maccabi Tel Aviv in the Quarterfinals.

=== Iraklis Thessaloniki (2019–2020) ===
On July 26, 2019, Shuler signed with Iraklis Thessaloniki of the Greek Basket League for the 2019–20 season. He averaged 13.5 points, 3.9 assists and 3.6 rebounds per game.

=== Aris (2020–2021) ===
On September 20, 2020, Shuler signed with Aris of the Greek Basket League.

== The Basketball Tournament ==
In 2017, Shuler participated in The Basketball Tournament for Ram Nation, a team of VCU alumni. Shuler averaged 10.8 PPG and 2.8 RPG during the tournament. Ram Nation advanced to the Elite 8 before losing to eventual tournament champs Overseas Elite. The Basketball Tournament is an annual $2 million winner-take-all tournament broadcast on ESPN.
