= CS Concordia Chiajna (basketball) =

Concordia Chiajna
- Founded: 1957
- Dissolved: 2013
- Arena: Sala Sporturilor Chiajna
- Location: Chiajna, Romania
- Team colors: Yellow and Green
- Championships: -
Home	Away

CS Concordia Chiajna was a Romanian professional basketball club, based in Chiajna, Romania. The club was founded in 1957 and dissolved in 2013.
