= Nemanja Milošević =

Montenegrin basketball player

Personal information
- Born: July 4, 1987 (age 39) Bar, SR Montenegro, SFR Yugoslavia
- Listed height: 2.04 m (6 ft 8 in)
- Listed weight: 111 kg (245 lb)

Career information
- College: NJIT (2006–2008); Western Kentucky (2009–2010)
- Playing career: 2010–present
- Position: Power forward / center

Career history
- 2010–2012: Budućnost Podgorica
- 2012: Mornar Bar
- 2012–2013: Yambol
- 2013: Ford Burgos
- 2014–2015: Energia Târgu Jiu
- 2015–2016: New Basket Brindisi
- 2016–2017: Tsmoki-Minsk
- 2017: Orléans Loiret Basket
- 2017-2018: CSM Oradea
- 2018: Levski Lukoil
- 2018–2019: Szolnoki Olajbányász
- 2019–2020: Studentski centar
- 2021–2022: MZT Skopje
- 2022: Piratas de La Guaira
- 2022–2023: GGMT Vienna
- 2023–2024: BCH Garid Ulaanbaatar
- 2024: UGB Kigali
- 2025: BC Alborz
- 2025–2026: Hoops Club

Career highlights
- MVP of Macedonian League Finals (2022); Macedonian League champion (2022); Bulgarian League champion (2018); Romanian Cup winner (2014); 2× Montenegrin League champion (2011–2012); 2× Montenegrin Cup winner (2011–2012)
Medals
Men's basketball
Representing Montenegro
Games of the Small States of Europe
Gold medal – first place	2015 Reykjavík	National Team

Nemanja Milošević (born July 4, 1987) is a Montenegrin professional basketball player for Hoops Club of the Lebanese Basketball League (LBL). He plays as a power forward or as a center.

== Professional career ==
Milošević started his career in his home country with power house Budućnost Podgorica. He won the league title with Podgorica.

In 2012, he signed with Mornar Bar. In November 2012, he left Mornar and signed in Bulgaria with Yambol.

In December 2013, Milošević signed with Ford Burgos, of the Spanish LEB Oro league. However, he only could play two games due to the club was sanctioned by FIBA. Finally, he left the team in February 2014.

After leaving Spain, Milošević signed with Energia Rovinari of the Romanian League for finishing the league. He extended his contract for the 2014–15 season.

On 24 June 2015, Milošević signed with Italian club Enel Brindisi for the 2015–16 season.

On August 16, 2016, Milošević signed with Belarusian club Tsmoki-Minsk. On March 22, 2017, he left Minsk and signed with French club Orléans Loiret Basket for the rest of the 2016–17 Pro A season.

On July 28, 2017, Milošević signed with Romanian club CSM Oradea for the 2017–18 season.

Milošević spent the 2019–20 season with Studentski centar, averaging 16.7 points, 8.4 rebounds, and 2.3 assists per game. On September 28, 2021, he signed with MZT Skopje of the Macedonian League.

== Montenegro national team ==
Milošević was called by the Montenegrin basketball team for the first time in May 2015, for playing the Games of the Small States of Europe at Iceland.
