= Dwight Hardy =

American basketball player (born 1986)

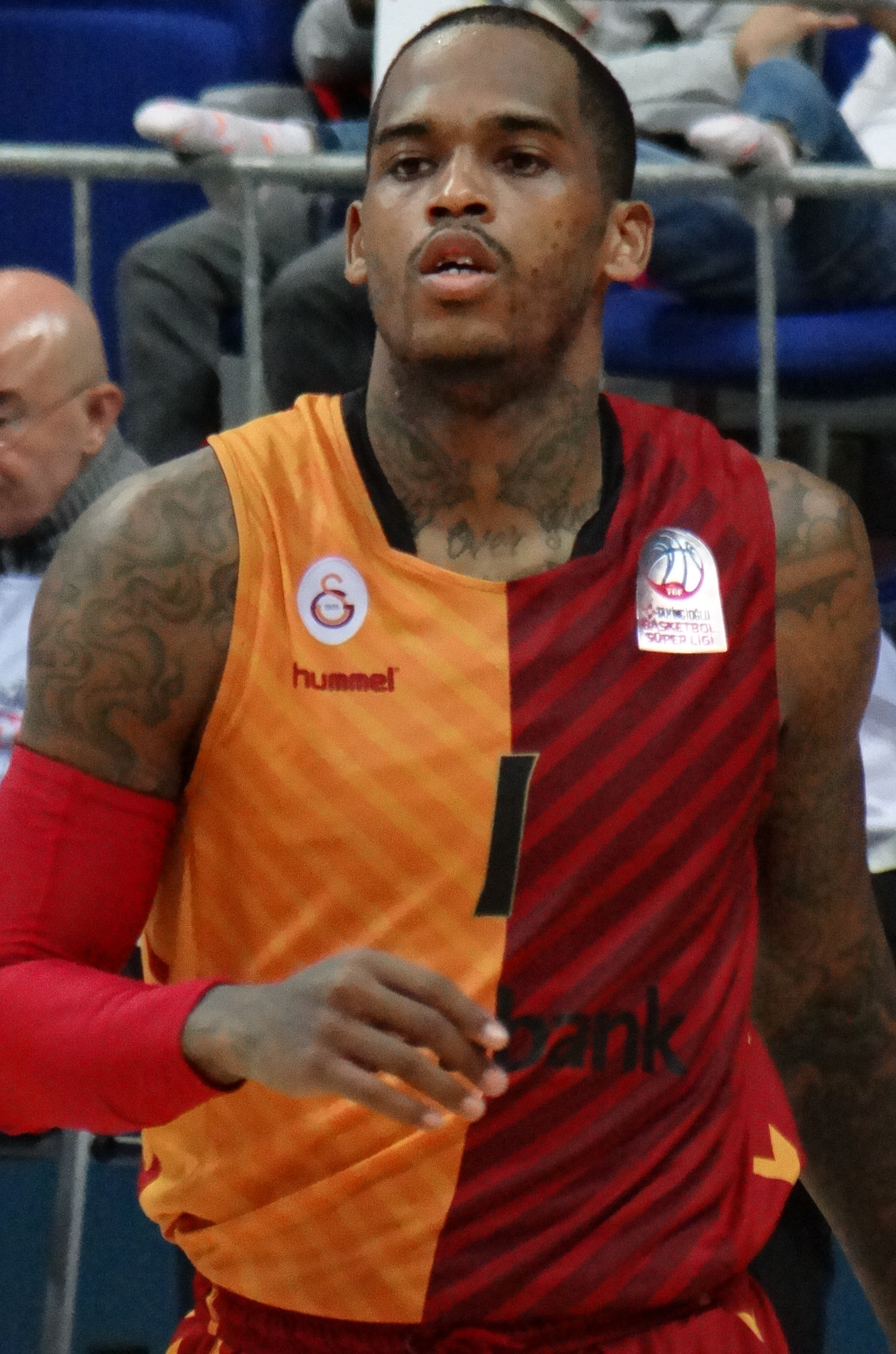
- Hardy with Galatasaray in 2018

Personal information
- Born: December 2, 1986 (age 39) Bronx, New York, U.S.
- Listed height: 6 ft 2 in (1.88 m)
- Listed weight: 195.8 lb (89 kg)

Career information
- High school: John F. Kennedy (Bronx, New York)
- College: Indian Hills CC (2007–2009); St. John's (2009–2011)
- NBA draft: 2011: undrafted
- Playing career: 2011–2021
- Position: Shooting guard

Career history
- 2011–2012: Pistoia
- 2012–2013: Sidigas Avellino
- 2013: Sigma Barcellona
- 2013–2014: Virtus Bologna
- 2014–2017: Trabzonspor
- 2017–2018: Galatasaray
- 2018–2019: Limoges CSP
- 2019–2020: Bahçeşehir Koleji
- 2020–2021: OGM Ormanspor

Career highlights
- Turkish League All-Star (2016); Italian Second Division MVP (2012); Italian Second Division Top Scorer (2012); First-team All-Big East (2011); Big East Most Improved Player (2011)

Dwight Junior Hardy (born December 2, 1986) is an American professional basketball player, who lastly played for OGM Ormanspor of the Basketball Super League.

He also holds a Congolese passport.

== College career ==
St. John's head coach Steve Lavin praised Hardy, calling him one of the best shooters he has ever coached. In March 2011, Hardy was one of the 20 finalists selected for the coveted Wooden Award.

== Professional career ==
After a successful first season in Italy, averaging 22 points, 3 rebounds, and 2 assists per game for Pistoia Basket, and receiving Italian 2nd Division MVP honors, Hardy signed with Sidigas Avellino in the Italian 1st Division. In January 2013, he parted ways with them. In March 2013, he signed with the Italian 2nd Division club Sigma Barcellona for the remainder of the season.

On June 22, 2013, Hardy signed with the Italian 1st Division club Virtus Bologna. In June 2014, he signed with Trabzonspor Basketball of the Turkish League for the 2014–15 season.

On July 16, 2020, he has signed with OGM Ormanspor of the Basketball Super League.
