= Sean Marshall (basketball) =

American basketball player (born 1985)

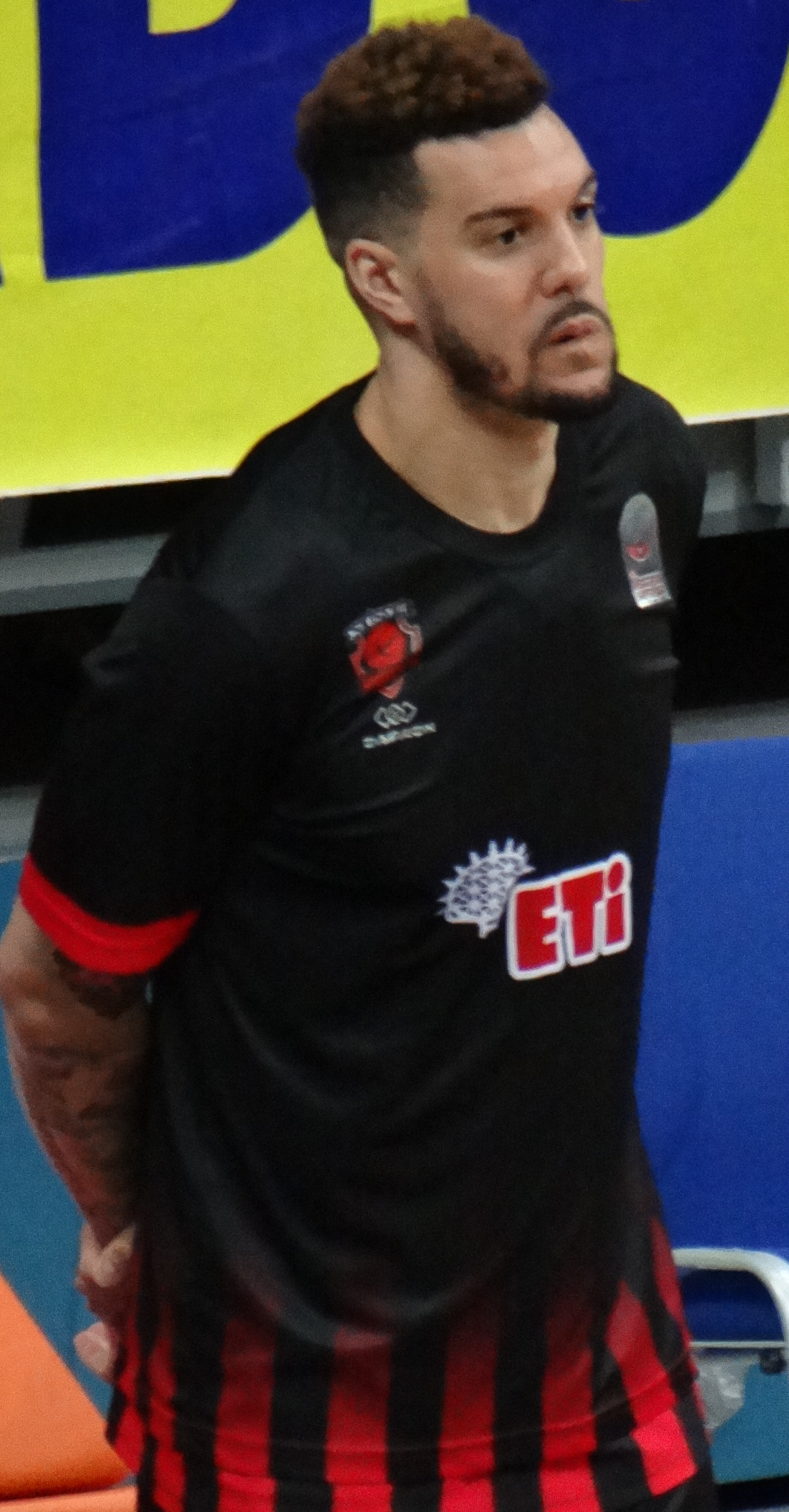
- Marshall with Eskişehir Basket in 2018

Personal information
- Born: April 11, 1985 (age 41) Rialto, California
- Listed height: 6 ft 6 in (1.98 m)
- Listed weight: 210 lb (95 kg)

Career information
- High school: Eisenhower (Rialto, California)
- College: Boston College (2003–2007)
- NBA draft: 2007: undrafted
- Playing career: 2007–2020
- Position: Small forward / shooting guard
- Number: 23, 9

Career history
- 2007–2008: Pınar Karşıyaka
- 2008–2009: Aris Thessaloniki
- 2009: Aliağa Petkim
- 2009–2010: JDA Dijon Basket
- 2010–2011: Sioux Falls Skyforce
- 2011: Pınar Karşıyaka
- 2011–2012: JDA Dijon Basket
- 2012–2013: Erdemirspor
- 2013–2014: Aliağa Petkim
- 2014: Al Ahli Dubai
- 2014–2015: Trabzonspor
- 2015–2016: Westchester Knicks
- 2016: Telekom Baskets Bonn
- 2016: JL Bourg-en-Bresse
- 2016–2018: Eskişehir Basket
- 2019–2020: Rizing Zephyr Fukuoka

Career highlights
- TBL All-Star (2008)

Sean James Marshall (born April 11, 1985) is an American former professional basketball player. He played college basketball for Boston College.

== College career ==
Marshall played college basketball at Boston College, where he, along with 2007 ACC Player of the Year Jared Dudley, were co-captains. He averaged 11.1 points per game in his sophomore and junior years, and 14.8 in his senior year when Boston College went 21–12. While at Boston College, Marshall was roommates with Pete Frates, who was later diagnosed with ALS.

== Professional career ==
After going undrafted in the 2007 NBA draft, Marshall signed with Pınar Karşıyaka of the Turkish Basketball League for the 2007–08 season. During his first pro season he averaged 19.47 points and 5.17 rebounds per game.

In June 2008, Marshall signed a one-year deal with Aris Thessaloniki of the Greek Basket League. He got injured in February 2009, and missed 6 weeks. In April 2009 he returned to Turkey and signed with Aliağa Petkim. He played only one game in Turkish League.

For the 2009–10 season, Marshall signed with JDA Dijon Basket of the French League. He played 29 games and averaged 14.7 points and 4.2 rebounds per game.

On November 2, 2010, Marshall was acquired by the Sioux Falls Skyforce of the NBA D-League. He played 48 games and averaged 14.1 points and 3.2 rebounds per game. He left them in April 2011, and returned to Turkey to play with his former team Pınar Karşıyaka.

Sean Marshall, 2011

In June 2011, Marshall signed with his former team JDA Dijon for the 2011–12 season. He played 30 games and averaged 11.7 points and 2.8 rebounds per game.

In July 2012, Marshall returned to Turkey and signed with Erdemirspor for the 2012–13 season. He played 28 games and averaged 14.1 points and 5.9 rebounds per game in Turkish Basketball League.

In July 2013, Marshall signed with his former team Aliağa Petkim. In March 2014, he was forced to leave the team due to the club's bad financial situation. On April 8, 2014, he signed with Al Ahli Dubai.

On June 17, 2014, Marshall signed with Trabzonspor Basketball for the 2014–15 season.

On November 2, 2015, Marshall was acquired by the Westchester Knicks after a successful tryout. On January 15, 2016, his contract was bought out by the Knicks. Two days later, he signed with Telekom Baskets Bonn of Germany for the rest of the 2015–16 Basketball Bundesliga season. On May 8, 2016, he signed with JL Bourg-en-Bresse of the LNB Pro B for the rest of the season.

On July 7, 2016, Marshall signed a one-year deal with Eskişehir Basket of the Turkish Basketball First League.

=== The Basketball Tournament (TBT) (2015–present) ===
Since 2015, Marshall has played in The Basketball Tournament (TBT), a winner-take-all single-elimination tournament played annually during the summer and broadcast by ESPN, for Team Challenge ALS. He is also the general manager of the team. Marshall was named to the All-Tournament Team for TBT 2017, when he score 18.3 points per game and Team Challenge ALS made it to the championship final, where they lost in a close game to Overseas Elite, 86–83.

In TBT 2018, Marshall averaged nine points per game and 3.3 rebounds per game for Team Challenge ALS. They reached the West Regional Championship Game before losing to eventual tournament runner-up Eberlein Drive.
