= CS Energia Târgu Jiu =

Energia Târgu Jiu
- Founded: 2002
- Dissolved: 2016
- History: Energia Rovinari (2002–2014); Energia Târgu Jiu (2014–2016)
- Arena: Sala Sporturilor
- Capacity: 1,500
- Location: Târgu Jiu, Romania
- Team colors: Yellow, Red
- Championships: 1 Romanian Cup (2014)
- Website: www.csenergia.ro
Home	Away

Clubul Sportiv Energia was a Romanian professional basketball club based in Târgu Jiu, Romania. The club competed in the Liga I, the second tier of basketball in Romania. The club was founded in 2002 and was dissolved in 2016 after financial problems.

== History ==
The team promoted to the First division in 2008, managing to finish 7th and qualify for the Romanian Cup semifinals in the first year in the Liga Națională. Their first year performance was the best performance a newly promoted team had ever had in the history of Romania. Head Coach Theo Evans also became the youngest coach ever to coach in Romania, when he took the job at age 26. He was also the first African-American coach in Romania as well as the first Japanese-American coach.

In the 2013–14 season, Energia won its first trophy. Romanian Cup. In the Final, they beat CSM Oradea 58–55.

In the 2014–15 season, Energia made its first European performance, when it competed in the EuroChallenge. After beating Le Mans in the Quarterfinals, Energia qualified for the competition Final Four. It was the first time a Romanian team reached a Final Four of one of the three first levels of European competitions. In the Final Four Energia ended third.

In 2015–16 season after its European success, the team relegated to the second tier Liga I by finishing in the 11th place. After the season, the club was dissolved due to its financial problems.

== Honours ==
=== Romania ===
Romanian Championship

- Third place (1): 2015–16

Romanian Cup

- Champions (1): 2014

Romanian Supercup

- Runner-up (1): 2014

=== Europe ===
EuroChallenge

- Third place: 2014–15

== Season by season ==
Season	Tier	League	Pos.	Romanian Cup	European competitions	
2012–13	1	Liga Națională	9th			
2013–14	1	Liga Națională	8th	Champions		
2014–15	1	Liga Națională	3rd		3 EuroChallenge	3rd
2015–16	1	Liga Națională	11th		3 FIBA Europe Cup	EF

== Notable players ==
- Set a club record or won an individual award as a professional player.
- Played at least one official international match for his senior national team at any time.

- (Trinidad and Tobago) Kibwe Trim
