= 2007 FIBA Under-19 World Championship =

Tournament details
- Host country: Serbia
- City: Novi Sad
- Dates: 12–22 July
- Teams: 16 (from 5 confederations)
- Venue: 1 (in 1 host city)

Final positions
- Champions: Serbia (1st title)

Tournament statistics
- MVP: (Serbia) Milan Mačvan
- Top scorer: (Brazil) Paulão Prestes (23.0)
- Top rebounds: (Brazil) Paulão Prestes (14.7)
- Top assists: (Lithuania) Žygimantas Janavičius (6.6)
- PPG (Team): United States (93.7)
- RPG (Team): Nigeria (51.6)
- APG (Team): Lithuania (19.4)

Official website
- archive.today

The 2007 FIBA Under-19 World Championship (Serbian: Светско првенство до 19 година ФИБА до 19 година) was the 8th edition of the FIBA U19 World Championship. It was held in Novi Sad, Serbia from 12 to 22 July 2007. The host nation won the tournament after beating the United States 74–69 in the final. Milan Mačvan was named the tournament MVP.

== Venue ==
Novi Sad	Serbia
SPC Vojvodina	2007 FIBA Under-19 World Championship (Serbia)
Capacity: 11,000	2007 FIBA Under-19 World Championship (Serbia)

== Qualified teams ==
Means of Qualification	Dates	Venue	Berths	Qualifiers
Host Nation	—N/a	—N/a	1	Serbia
2006 FIBA Under-18 African Championship	28 July–6 August 2006	(South Africa) Durban	2	Nigeria; Mali
2006 FIBA Under-18 Americas Championship	28 June–2 July 2006	(United States) San Antonio	5	United States; Argentina; Brazil; Canada; Puerto Rico
2006 FIBA Under-18 Asian Championship	1–9 September 2006	(China) Ürümqi	3	China; South Korea; Lebanon
2006 FIBA Under-18 European Championship	18–27 July 2006	(Greece) Amaliada / Olympia / Argostoli	4	France; Lithuania; Spain; Turkey
2006 FIBA Under-18 Oceania Championship	—N/a	—N/a	1	Australia
Total			16	

== Preliminary round ==
=== Group A ===
Pos	Team	Pld	W	L	PF	PA	PD	Pts	Qualification
1	France	3	3	0	283	213	+70	6	Second round
2	Brazil	3	2	1	237	240	−3	5	Second round
3	Lithuania	3	1	2	262	235	+27	4	Second round
4	Lebanon	3	0	3	194	288	−94	3	13th–16th Classification

Source: FIBA
Rules for classification: 1) points; 2) head-to-head points difference.

12 July 2007
13:30

Boxscore

Lithuania	82–85	France
Scoring by quarter: 15–20, 16–20, 29–24, 22–21
Pts: Valukonis, Gecevičius 20; Rebs: Čepukaitis, Skurdauskas 8 Asts: Janavičius 9		Pts: Jackson 25; Rebs: Moerman 10; Asts: Diot, Mangin 2

SPC Vojvodina, Novi Sad

12 July 2007
13:30

Boxscore

Brazil	83–67	Lebanon
Scoring by quarter: 22–26, 14–12, 25–9, 22–20
Pts: Prestes 17; Rebs: Prestes 18; Asts: Duarte, Ortega 3		Pts: Martinez 17; Rebs: Abi Mrad 9 Asts: Akl 6

Arena of Vojvodina NIS Gas, Novi Sad

13 July 2007
13:30

Boxscore

Lebanon	69–105	Lithuania
Scoring by quarter: 18–35, 17–22, 9–21, 25–27
Pts: Martinez 16; Rebs: Farraj 6 Asts: Martinez 4		Pts: Gvezdauskas 27; Rebs: Grinius 10; Asts: Birgelis 7

SPC Vojvodina, Novi Sad

13 July 2007
13:30

Boxscore

France	98–73	Brazil
Scoring by quarter: 23–14, 19–21, 29–19, 27–19
Pts: Jackson 24; Rebs: Batum, Moerman 7 Asts: Batum 6		Pts: Prestes 17; Rebs: Prestes 11; Asts: Ortega 3

Arena of Vojvodina NIS Gas, Novi Sad

14 July 2007
13:30

Boxscore

Lithuania	75–81	Brazil
Scoring by quarter: 17–23, 19–16, 25–10, 14–32
Pts: Valukonis 21; Rebs: Skurdauskas 11; Asts: Janavičius 6		Pts: Prestes 26; Rebs: Prestes 9 Asts: de Moura, Duarte 2

Arena of Vojvodina NIS Gas, Novi Sad

14 July 2007
15:45

Boxscore

Lebanon	58–100	France
Scoring by quarter: 18–26, 14–24, 12–27, 14–23
Pts: Hamdar 12; Rebs: Bitar, Abi Mrad 5 Asts: Martinez 3		Pts: Batum 15; Rebs: Vaty 10; Asts: three players 3

SPC Vojvodina, Novi Sad

=== Group B ===
Pos	Team	Pld	W	L	PF	PA	PD	Pts	Qualification
1	United States	3	3	0	303	211	+92	6	Second round
2	Serbia (H)	3	2	1	226	190	+36	5	Second round
3	China	3	1	2	197	227	−30	4	Second round
4	Mali	3	0	3	149	247	−98	3	13th–16th Classification

Source: FIBA
Rules for classification: 1) points; 2) head-to-head points difference.
(H) Hosts

12 July 2007
18:00

Boxscore

Mali	56–118	United States
Scoring by quarter: 5–34, 23–20, 12–32, 16–32
Pts: W. Coulibaly 22; Rebs: Sega 5 Asts: three players 2		Pts: Beasley 21; Rebs: Thompson, Jordan 7 Asts: Flynn 7

Arena of Vojvodina NIS Gas, Novi Sad

12 July 2007
18:00

Boxscore

China	61–78	Serbia
Scoring by quarter: 19–17, 8–24, 23–20, 11–17
Pts: Su 14; Rebs: Tian 7 Asts: Xu Y. 4		Pts: Jeremić 25; Rebs: Raduljica 7 Asts: Despotović 6

SPC Vojvodina, Novi Sad
Attendance: 1000

13 July 2007
18:00

Boxscore

Serbia	70–47	Mali
Scoring by quarter: 17–14, 21–6, 10–10, 22–17
Pts: Raduljica 14; Rebs: Raduljica 19; Asts: Kešelj, Čakarević 3		Pts: W. Coulibaly 17; Rebs: Dembele 12; Asts: W. Coulibaly 2

SPC Vojvodina, Novi Sad

13 July 2007
20:30

Boxscore

United States	103–77	China
Scoring by quarter: 24–15, 31–15, 26–29, 22–18
Pts: Beasley 21; Rebs: Curry 8 Asts: Beverley 6		Pts: Xu Y. 22; Rebs: Yang 5 Asts: Yang 3

Arena of Vojvodina NIS Gas, Novi Sad

14 July 2007
15:45

Boxscore

Mali	46–59	China
Scoring by quarter: 14–10, 5–13, 18–23, 9–13
Pts: W. Coulibaly 19; Rebs: Dembele 11; Asts: Tangara 2		Pts: Su 16; Rebs: Su 8 Asts: Yang 5

Arena of Vojvodina NIS Gas, Novi Sad

14 July 2007
18:00

Boxscore

Serbia	78–82	United States
Scoring by quarter: 18–13, 19–26, 13–25, 28–18
Pts: Mačvan, Raduljica 15; Rebs: Mačvan 6 Asts: Katnić 4		Pts: Curry 19; Rebs: Beverley 9 Asts: Beverley 3

SPC Vojvodina, Novi Sad
Attendance: 5000

=== Group C ===
Pos	Team	Pld	W	L	PF	PA	PD	Pts	Qualification
1	Australia	3	3	0	235	208	+27	6	Second round
2	Turkey	3	2	1	237	217	+20	5	Second round
3	Canada	3	1	2	210	222	−12	4	Second round
4	Nigeria	3	0	3	215	250	−35	3	13th–16th Classification

Source: FIBA
Rules for classification: 1) points; 2) head-to-head points difference.

12 July 2007
15:45

Boxscore

Nigeria	60–82	Canada
Scoring by quarter: 20–17, 15–18, 13–26, 12–21
Pts: Negedu 16; Rebs: Negedu 14; Asts: Daudu 3		Pts: D. Joseph 33; Rebs: three players 6 Asts: Cole 4

Arena of Vojvodina NIS Gas, Novi Sad

12 July 2007
20:30

Boxscore

Turkey	65–77	Australia
Scoring by quarter: 17–25, 14–15, 18–18, 16–19
Pts: Balbay 15; Rebs: Aydoğan 7 Asts: Hacıoğlu, Balbay 4		Pts: Ogilvy 17; Rebs: Goulding 5 Asts: Mills 5

SPC Vojvodina, Novi Sad

13 July 2007
15:45

Boxscore

Australia	77–73	Nigeria
Scoring by quarter: 17–10, 21–24, 21–21, 18–18
Pts: Ogilvy 19; Rebs: three players 4 Asts: Mills 6		Pts: Yusuf 18; Rebs: Bukar, Yusuf 7 Asts: Daudu 7

SPC Vojvodina, Novi Sad

13 July 2007
18:00

Boxscore

Canada	58–81	Turkey
Scoring by quarter: 11–23, 15–21, 15–15, 17–22
Pts: Bakovic 14; Rebs: Bakovic 10; Asts: D. Joseph 2		Pts: Sevinç, C. Özcan 15; Rebs: Çipa 9 Asts: Balbay 10

Arena of Vojvodina NIS Gas, Novi Sad

14 July 2007
13:30

Boxscore

Australia	81–70	Canada
Scoring by quarter: 28–22, 19–15, 17–12, 17–21
Pts: Ogilvy 26; Rebs: Ogilvy 18; Asts: Goulding, Mills 3		Pts: D. Joseph 31; Rebs: Walker 9 Asts: D. Joseph, House 2

SPC Vojvodina, Novi Sad

14 July 2007
18:00

Boxscore

Nigeria	82–91	Turkey
Scoring by quarter: 19–25, 21–25, 21–16, 21–25
Pts: Yusuf 29; Rebs: Yusuf 8 Asts: Daudu, Yusuf 3		Pts: Hacıoğlu 19; Rebs: Özurgancı, Çipa 7 Asts: Hacıoğlu 3

Arena of Vojvodina NIS Gas, Novi Sad

=== Group D ===
Pos	Team	Pld	W	L	PF	PA	PD	Pts	Qualification
1	Spain	3	3	0	276	237	+39	6	Second round
2	Argentina	3	2	1	271	245	+26	5	Second round
3	South Korea	3	1	2	263	282	−19	4	Second round
4	Puerto Rico	3	0	3	255	301	−46	3	13th–16th Classification

Source: FIBA
Rules for classification: 1) points; 2) head-to-head points difference.

12 July 2007
15:45

Boxscore

Puerto Rico	89–91	Spain
Scoring by quarter: 20–23, 20–18, 21–26, 28–24
Pts: García 22; Rebs: Díaz 8 Asts: Morales, Torres 3		Pts: Claver 31; Rebs: Claver 13; Asts: Colom 6

SPC Vojvodina, Novi Sad

12 July 2007
20:30

Boxscore

Argentina	91–85	South Korea
Scoring by quarter: 18–18, 22–25, 27–24, 24–18
Pts: Gerbaudo 16; Rebs: Gerbaudo 8 Asts: Gerbaudo 8		Pts: Kim J. 24; Rebs: Kim J. 12; Asts: Kim H. 6

Arena of Vojvodina NIS Gas, Novi Sad

13 July 2007
15:45

Boxscore

South Korea	98–94	Puerto Rico
Scoring by quarter: 20–17, 21–23, 27–25, 30–29
Pts: Kim M.S. 23; Rebs: Kim J. 9 Asts: Park 5		Pts: Clavell 29; Rebs: Clavell 13; Asts: Soto 3

Arena of Vojvodina NIS Gas, Novi Sad

13 July 2007
20:30

Boxscore

Spain	88–68	Argentina
Scoring by quarter: 13–9, 20–18, 30–11, 25–30
Pts: Claver 23; Rebs: Claver 9 Asts: Forcada 3		Pts: Aguirre 19; Rebs: Cecchi 6 Asts: de los Santos 4

SPC Vojvodina, Novi Sad

14 July 2007
20:30

Boxscore

Argentina	112–72	Puerto Rico
Scoring by quarter: 17–19, 25–17, 37–16, 33–20
Pts: Vega, Piñero 20; Rebs: de los Santos, Vega 7 Asts: de los Santos, Machuca 6		Pts: Soto 14; Rebs: García 7 Asts: Soto 2

Arena of Vojvodina NIS Gas, Novi Sad

14 July 2007
20:30

Boxscore

Spain	97–80	South Korea
Scoring by quarter: 19–16, 30–18, 31–28, 17–18
Pts: Forcada 23; Rebs: Claver 7 Asts: Colom 6		Pts: Kim M.S. 13; Rebs: Kim J. 12; Asts: Kwon 4

SPC Vojvodina, Novi Sad

== Second round ==
=== Group E ===
Pos	Team	Pld	W	L	PF	PA	PD	Pts	Qualification
1	United States	5	5	0	466	383	+83	10	Quarterfinal Round
2	Serbia (H)	5	4	1	411	356	+55	9	Quarterfinal Round
3	France	5	3	2	433	378	+55	8	Quarterfinal Round
4	Brazil	5	2	3	383	441	−58	7	Quarterfinal Round
5	Lithuania	5	1	4	399	411	−12	6	9th–12th Classification
6	China	5	0	5	338	461	−123	5	9th–12th Classification

Source: FIBA
Rules for classification: 1) points; 2) head-to-head points difference.
(H) Hosts

16 July 2007
18:00

Boxscore

Serbia	87–75	Brazil
Scoring by quarter: 21–22, 23–12, 23–21, 20–20
Pts: Mačvan 36; Rebs: Marjanović 10; Asts: Despotović 4		Pts: Duarte 22; Rebs: Prestes 14; Asts: three players 3

SPC Vojvodina, Novi Sad

16 July 2007
20:30

Boxscore

China	57–106	France
Scoring by quarter: 14–26, 14–26, 15–28, 14–26
Pts: Ba 15; Rebs: Tian 8 Asts: Xu Y. 2		Pts: Jackson 23; Rebs: Vaty 6 Asts: Batum 8

SPC Vojvodina, Novi Sad

16 July 2007
20:30

Boxscore

United States	90–81	Lithuania
Scoring by quarter: 18–19, 27–20, 28–18, 17–24
Pts: Lighty 19; Rebs: Morgan 6 Asts: Beverley 4		Pts: Gailius 19; Rebs: Grinius 7 Asts: Janavičius 6

SPC Vojvodina, Novi Sad

17 July 2007
15:45

Boxscore

Lithuania	85–66	China
Scoring by quarter: 17–12, 15–16, 26–16, 27–22
Pts: Gecevičius 17; Rebs: Janavičius 9 Asts: Janavičius 6		Pts: Xu Y. 16; Rebs: Yang, Wang 6 Asts: Xu Y. 3

SPC Vojvodina, Novi Sad

17 July 2007
18:00

Boxscore

France	62–79	Serbia
Scoring by quarter: 14–15, 21–19, 16–17, 11–28
Pts: Ajinça 14; Rebs: Batum 9 Asts: Batum 6		Pts: Kešelj 18; Rebs: Marjanović 10; Asts: Marković 5

SPC Vojvodina, Novi Sad

17 July 2007
20:30

Boxscore

Brazil	65–104	United States
Scoring by quarter: 16–30, 15–15, 17–33, 17–26
Pts: Prestes 26; Rebs: Prestes 13; Asts: Bramorski 3		Pts: Beasley 16; Rebs: Beasley 9 Asts: Curry, Beverley 3

SPC Vojvodina, Novi Sad

18 July 2007
15:45

Boxscore

China	77–89	Brazil
Scoring by quarter: 19–16, 9–34, 23–14, 26–25
Pts: Xu Y. 23; Rebs: Su 12; Asts: Yang, Xu Y. 3		Pts: Prestes 26; Rebs: Prestes 14; Asts: Duarte 6

SPC Vojvodina, Novi Sad

18 July 2007
18:00

Boxscore

Serbia	89–76	Lithuania
Scoring by quarter: 24–13, 24–24, 14–13, 27–26
Pts: Raduljica 23; Rebs: Raduljica 7 Asts: Despotović, Mačvan 4		Pts: Janavičius 17; Rebs: Valukonis 6 Asts: Janavičius 7

SPC Vojvodina, Novi Sad

18 July 2007
20:30

Boxscore

United States	87–82	France
Scoring by quarter: 13–19, 26–16, 24–18, 24–29
Pts: Flynn 18; Rebs: Beasley 8 Asts: Curry 4		Pts: Jackson 22; Rebs: Ajinça 12; Asts: Batum, Diot 4

SPC Vojvodina, Novi Sad

=== Group F ===
Pos	Team	Pld	W	L	PF	PA	PD	Pts	Qualification
1	Australia	5	5	0	458	376	+82	10	Quarterfinal Round
2	Spain	5	3	2	408	362	+46	8	Quarterfinal Round
3	Turkey	5	2	3	360	363	−3	7 (Note: 1−1, 1.111 (beaten Canada, lost to Argentina))	Quarterfinal Round
4	Argentina	5	2	3	387	398	−11	7 (Note: 1−1, 1.027 (beaten Turkey, lost to Canada))	Quarterfinal Round
5	Canada	5	2	3	383	410	−27	7 (Note: 1−1, 0.890 (beaten Argentina, lost to Turkey))	9th–12th Classification
6	South Korea	5	1	4	431	518	−87	6	9th–12th Classification

Source: FIBA
Rules for classification: 1) points; 2) head-to-head points difference.
Notes:

16 July 2007
15:45

Boxscore

South Korea	79–135	Australia
Scoring by quarter: 22–28, 7–29, 31–42, 19–36
Pts: Kim S.H. 22; Rebs: Byun 6 Asts: Byun, Jung 4		Pts: Ogilvy 27; Rebs: Ogilvy 12; Asts: Probert 7

Arena of Vojvodina NIS Gas, Novi Sad

16 July 2007
15:45

Boxscore

Spain	83–69	Canada
Scoring by quarter: 21–16, 20–18, 24–20, 18–15
Pts: Forcada 18; Rebs: Forcada 9 Asts: Colom, Forcada 3		Pts: Wiliams, Joseph 21; Rebs: Brittain 8 Asts: three players 2

Arena of Vojvodina NIS Gas, Novi Sad

16 July 2007
18:00

Boxscore

Argentina	68–59	Turkey
Scoring by quarter: 17–18, 14–18, 14–15, 23–8
Pts: Aguirre 14; Rebs: Aguirre 11; Asts: Gerbaudo 7		Pts: Balbay 14; Rebs: Balbay 8 Asts: Hacıoğlu 2

Arena of Vojvodina NIS Gas, Novi Sad

17 July 2007
15:45

Boxscore

Canada	99–83	South Korea
Scoring by quarter: 23–18, 19–27, 28–22, 29–16
Pts: Wiliams 27; Rebs: Wiliams 12; Asts: three players 3		Pts: Kim M.S. 22; Rebs: Kim S.W., Park 7 Asts: Park 4

Arena of Vojvodina NIS Gas, Novi Sad

17 July 2007
18:00

Boxscore

Turkey	59–56	Spain
Scoring by quarter: 14–11, 13–4, 26–22, 6–19
Pts: Balbay 16; Rebs: Aydoğan 9 Asts: three players 2		Pts: Colom, Forcada 11; Rebs: Vega 13; Asts: Forcada 3

Arena of Vojvodina NIS Gas, Novi Sad

17 July 2007
18:00

Boxscore

Australia	79–78	Argentina
Scoring by quarter: 22–13, 16–16, 30–19, 11–30
Pts: Ogilvy 18; Rebs: Ogilvy 12; Asts: Mills 6		Pts: Aguirre 16; Rebs: Aguerre 4 Asts: Gerbaudo 6

Arena of Vojvodina NIS Gas, Novi Sad

18 July 2007
15:45

Boxscore

South Korea	104–96	Turkey
Scoring by quarter: 24–24, 24–14, 30–31, 26–27
Pts: Kwon 20; Rebs: Ham 10; Asts: five players 2		Pts: Sevinç 25; Rebs: Aydoğan 9 Asts: Balbay 5

Arena of Vojvodina NIS Gas, Novi Sad

18 July 2007
18:00

Boxscore

Spain	84–86	Australia
Scoring by quarter: 22–22, 18–20, 19–21, 25–23
Pts: Colom 20; Rebs: Vega 8 Asts: Colom, Claver 4		Pts: Ogilvy 32; Rebs: Ogilvy 11; Asts: three players 3

Arena of Vojvodina NIS Gas, Novi Sad

18 July 2007
20:30

Boxscore

Argentina	82–87	Canada
Scoring by quarter: 24–24, 13–21, 17–13, 28–29
Pts: de los Santos 24; Rebs: Vega 10; Asts: Aguirre 3		Pts: Wiliams 25; Rebs: Bakovic 13; Asts: D. Joseph 5

Arena of Vojvodina NIS Gas, Novi Sad

== Classification 13th–16th ==
13th–16th classification
16 July – Novi Sad
Lebanon	76
Mali	56
16 July – Novi Sad
Nigeria	97
Puerto Rico	77

Thirteenth place
17 July – Novi Sad
Lebanon	65
Nigeria	82
Fifteenth place
17 July – Novi Sad
Mali	89
Puerto Rico	81

=== Semifinals ===
16 July 2007
13:30

Boxscore

Lebanon	76–56	Mali
Scoring by quarter: 17–13, 20–14, 17–15, 22–14
Pts: Farraj 29; Rebs: Hamdar 10; Asts: Farraj 3		Pts: Haidara 15; Rebs: Samake 8 Asts: W. Coulibaly 3

SPC Vojvodina, Novi Sad

16 July 2007
13:30

Boxscore

Nigeria	97–77	Puerto Rico
Scoring by quarter: 23–18, 20–18, 25–17, 29–24
Pts: Negedu 23; Rebs: Alabi 15; Asts: Ohiero 7		Pts: Soto 19; Rebs: López 6 Asts: Soto 4

Arena of Vojvodina NIS Gas, Novi Sad

=== 15th place ===
17 July 2007
13:30

Boxscore

Mali	89–81	Puerto Rico
Scoring by quarter: 14–19, 19–13, 27–21, 29–28
Pts: W. Coulibaly 28; Rebs: Diarra 10; Asts: Kaba, Tangara 4		Pts: Martínez 21; Rebs: García 12; Asts: Duran, Butler 4

Arena of Vojvodina NIS Gas, Novi Sad

=== 13th place ===
17 July 2007
13:30

Boxscore

Lebanon	65–82	Nigeria
Scoring by quarter: 17–26, 22–20, 11–24, 15–12
Pts: Farraj 18; Rebs: Hamdar 8 Asts: Akl 5		Pts: Negedu 27; Rebs: Negedu, Alabi 10; Asts: Daudu 5

SPC Vojvodina, Novi Sad

== Classification 9th–12th ==
9th–12th classification
20 July – Novi Sad
Lithuania	127
South Korea	74
20 July – Novi Sad
China	90
Canada	94

Ninth place
17 July – Novi Sad
Lithuania	86
Canada	75
Eleventh place
17 July – Novi Sad
South Korea	91
China	75

=== Semifinals ===
20 July 2007
13:30

Boxscore

Lithuania	127–74	South Korea
Scoring by quarter: 26–12, 25–13, 35–29, 41–20
Pts: Valukonis 24; Rebs: Čepukaitis 11; Asts: Janavičius 10		Pts: Byun 16; Rebs: Kim M.W. 6 Asts: Kim H. 3

Arena of Vojvodina NIS Gas, Novi Sad

20 July 2007
15:45

Boxscore

China	90–94 (OT)	Canada
Scoring by quarter: 19–21, 16–17, 17–18, 26–22, Overtime: 12–16
Pts: Ba 21; Rebs: Li X. 13; Asts: three players 2		Pts: D. Joseph 29; Rebs: Brittain 10; Asts: D. Joseph 8

Arena of Vojvodina NIS Gas, Novi Sad

=== 11th place ===
21 July 2007
13:30

Boxscore

South Korea	91–75	China
Scoring by quarter: 26–27, 21–20, 25–12, 19–16
Pts: Kim J. 25; Rebs: Kim J. 16; Asts: Jung 7		Pts: Xu Y. 24; Rebs: Li X. 9 Asts: Gu 3

Arena of Vojvodina NIS Gas, Novi Sad

=== 9th place ===
21 July 2007
15:45

Boxscore

Lithuania	86–75	Canada
Scoring by quarter: 21–16, 24–24, 17–20, 24–15
Pts: Gecevičius 23; Rebs: Grinius 10; Asts: Janavičius 7		Pts: D. Joseph 29; Rebs: Brittain 7 Asts: D. Joseph 3

Arena of Vojvodina NIS Gas, Novi Sad

== Knockout stage ==
=== Bracket ===
Fifth place
F4	Argentina	59
F1	Australia	83
Seventh place
F2	Spain	69
F3	Turkey	80

5th–8th place semifinals
F4	Argentina	78
F2	Spain	75
F3	Turkey	67
F1	Australia	82

Quarterfinals
E1	United States	112
F4	Argentina	86
E3	France	100
F2	Spain	83
E2	Serbia	94
F3	Turkey	56
E4	Brazil	73
F1	Australia	72

Semifinals
E1	United States	78
E3	France	75
E2	Serbia	89
E4	Brazil	74

Final
E1	United States	69
E2	Serbia	74
Third place
E3	France	75
E4	Brazil	67

=== Quarterfinals ===
20 July 2007
13:30

Boxscore

United States	112–86	Argentina
Scoring by quarter: 33–15, 29–25, 21–26, 29–20
Pts: Beverley 20; Rebs: Thompson 10; Asts: Flynn 5		Pts: de los Santos 18; Rebs: Vega 9 Asts: de los Santos 5

SPC Vojvodina, Novi Sad

20 July 2007
15:45

Boxscore

Brazil	73–72	Australia
Scoring by quarter: 14–19, 27–10, 14–23, 18–20
Pts: Duarte 23; Rebs: Prestes 14; Asts: Duarte 4		Pts: Ogilvy 22; Rebs: Dowdell 10; Asts: Mills 6

SPC Vojvodina, Novi Sad

20 July 2007
18:00

Boxscore

Serbia	94–56	Turkey
Scoring by quarter: 18–10, 22–17, 20–11, 34–18
Pts: Stojačić, Mačvan 13; Rebs: Marjanović 9 Asts: Despotović 7		Pts: Sevinç 12; Rebs: Balbay, C. Özcan 4 Asts: Balbay 2

SPC Vojvodina, Novi Sad
Attendance: 3500

20 July 2007
20:30

Boxscore

France	100–83	Spain
Scoring by quarter: 23–25, 30–19, 20–12, 27–27
Pts: Diot 27; Rebs: Moerman 9 Asts: Batum, Diot 7		Pts: Forcada 28; Rebs: Claver 9 Asts: Claver 6

SPC Vojvodina, Novi Sad

=== 5th–8th place semifinals ===
21 July 2007
13:30

Boxscore

Argentina	78–75	Spain
Scoring by quarter: 22–17, 21–9, 21–21, 14–28
Pts: de los Santos 15; Rebs: Aguerre 9 Asts: Gerbaudo 5		Pts: Colom 20; Rebs: Claver 8 Asts: Claver 3

SPC Vojvodina, Novi Sad

21 July 2007
15:45

Boxscore

Turkey	67–82	Australia
Scoring by quarter: 18–24, 14–20, 20–15, 15–23
Pts: K. Özcan 12; Rebs: Aydoğan 9 Asts: three players 3		Pts: Ogilvy 24; Rebs: Ogilvy 12; Asts: Goulding, Mills 4

SPC Vojvodina, Novi Sad

=== Semifinals ===
21 July 2007
18:00

Boxscore

Serbia	89–74	Brazil
Scoring by quarter: 25–17, 24–11, 18–23, 22–23
Pts: Jeremić 21; Rebs: Jeremić 6 Asts: Marković 5		Pts: Prestes 31; Rebs: Prestes 15; Asts: Verzolana 4

SPC Vojvodina, Novi Sad
Attendance: 5000

21 July 2007
20:30

Boxscore

United States	78–75	France
Scoring by quarter: 12–19, 18–18, 23–22, 25–16
Pts: Thompson 18; Rebs: Thompson 13; Asts: three players 3		Pts: Batum 18; Rebs: Moerman 12; Asts: Batum, Diot 3

SPC Vojvodina, Novi Sad

=== 7th place ===
22 July 2007
11:30

Boxscore

Spain	69–80	Turkey
Scoring by quarter: 25–7, 10–27, 17–20, 17–26
Pts: Forcada, Claver 20; Rebs: Claver 11; Asts: Colom 4		Pts: C. Özcan 22; Rebs: Balbay, K. Özcan 7 Asts: four players 2

SPC Vojvodina, Novi Sad

=== 5th place ===
22 July 2007
13:45

Boxscore

Argentina	59–83	Australia
Scoring by quarter: 14–16, 13–17, 14–24, 18–26
Pts: Machuca, Aguirre 10; Rebs: Aguirre 6 Asts: Gerbaudo 3		Pts: Mills 21; Rebs: Ogilvy 10; Asts: Probert 4

SPC Vojvodina, Novi Sad

=== 3rd place ===
22 July 2007
16:00

Boxscore

France	75–67	Brazil
Scoring by quarter: 12–19, 18–18, 23–22, 25–16
Pts: Jackson 13; Rebs: Moerman 12; Asts: Batum 3		Pts: Prestes 29; Rebs: Prestes 14; Asts: Duarte 4

SPC Vojvodina, Novi Sad

=== Final ===
22 July 2007
18:30

Boxscore

United States	69–74	Serbia
Scoring by quarter: 14–22, 16–21, 17–14, 22–17
Pts: Thompson 16; Rebs: Beverley 8 Asts: Flynn 3		Pts: Jeremić 24; Rebs: Mačvan 10; Asts: Marković 6

SPC Vojvodina, Novi Sad
Attendance: 8000

== Final standings ==
Rank	Team	Record
1st place, gold medalist(s)	Serbia	8–1
2nd place, silver medalist(s)	United States	8–1
3rd place, bronze medalist(s)	France	6–3
4th	Brazil	4–5
5th	Australia	8–1
6th	Argentina	4–5
7th	Turkey	4–5
8th	Spain	4–5
9th	Lithuania	4–4
10th	Canada	4–4
11th	South Korea	3–5
12th	China	1–7
13th	Nigeria	2–3
14th	Lebanon	1–4
15th	Mali	1–4
16th	Puerto Rico	0–5

== Medal rosters ==
(gold) (Serbia) 4 Mladen Jeremić, 5 Petar Despotović, 6 Dušan Katnić, 7 Stefan Marković, 8 Marko Kešelj, 9 Aleksandar Radulović, 10 Stefan Stojačić, 11 Marko Čakarević, 12 Milan Mačvan, 13 Miroslav Raduljica, 14 Boban Marjanović, 15 Slaven Čupković (Head coach: Miroslav Nikolić)

(silver) (United States) 4 Tajuan Porter, 5 Stephen Curry, 6 Jonny Flynn, 7 Patrick Beverley, 8 Matt Bouldin, 9 David Lighty, 10 Donté Greene, 11 Raymar Morgan, 12 Deon Thompson, 13 Damian Hollis, 14 Michael Beasley, 15 DeAndre Jordan (Head coach: Jerry Wainwright)

(bronze) (France) 4 Jessie Bégarin, 5 Nicolas Batum, 6 Antoine Diot, 7 Abdoulaye M'Baye, 8 Olivier Romain, 9 Alexis Ajinça, 10 Benoît Mangin, 11 Edwin Jackson, 12 Rudy Etilopy, 13 Kim Tillie, 14 Ludovic Vaty, 15 Adrien Moerman (Head coach: Richard Billant)

== Referees ==
- (Angola) Carlos José Julio
- (Brazil) Marcos Fornies Benito
- (China) Yanping Song
- (France) Eddie Viator
- (Greece) Konstantinos Koromilas
- (Italy) Enrico Sabetta
- (Japan) Yuji Hirahara
- (Lithuania) Tomas Jasevičius
- (Serbia) Ilija Belošević
- (Turkey) Recep Ankaralı
- (United States) Jeff Nichols

== Awards ==
2007 FIBA Under-19 World Championship

Serbia
First title

Most Valuable Player
(Serbia) Milan Mačvan
