= Eurocup Basketball 2013–14 Last 32 Group N =

Standings and Results for Group N of the Last 32 phase of the 2013–14 Eurocup basketball tournament.

== Standings ==
| | Team | Pld | W | L | PF | PA | Diff | Tie-break |
|---|---|---|---|---|---|---|---|---|
| 1. | (Germany) Alba Berlin | 6 | 5 | 1 | 479 | 442 | +37 | |
| 2. | (Ukraine) Khimik Yuzhny | 6 | 3 | 3 | 429 | 444 | –15 | |
| 3. | (Serbia) Radnički Kragujevac | 6 | 2 | 4 | 480 | 480 | 0 | 1–1 (+6) |
| 4. | (France) Strasbourg IG | 6 | 2 | 4 | 445 | 467 | –22 | 1–1 (–6) |

== Fixtures and results ==
=== Game 1 ===
8 January 2014
17:00 CET

| Khimik Yuzhny (Ukraine) | 73–68 | (Serbia) Radnički Kragujevac |
Scoring by quarter: 13–14, 19–20, 21–16, 20–18
| Pts: three players 14; Rebs: Freimanis 9 Asts: Delaney 6 | | Pts: Mlađan 15; Rebs: Birčević 10; Asts: Marinović 8 |

FSC Olymp, Yuzhny
Attendance: 1,000
Referees: Tomas Jasevicius (LTU), Marcin Kowalski (POL), Milos Koljensic (MNE)

8 January 2014
20:00 CET

Boxscore

| Alba Berlin (Germany) | 72–70 | (France) Strasbourg |
Scoring by quarter: 10–17, 24–14, 20–14, 18–25
| Pts: Logan 24; Rebs: three players 5 Asts: Hammonds 5 | | Pts: Duport 19; Rebs: Duport 8 Asts: Campbell 5 |

O2 World, Berlin
Attendance: 6,671
Referees: Juan Carlos Garcia Gonzalez (ESP), Robert Vyklicky (CZE), Sergio Silva (POR)

=== Game 2 ===
15 January 2014
18:00 CET

Boxscore

| Radnički Kragujevac (Serbia) | 75–85 (OT) | (Germany) Alba Berlin |
Scoring by quarter: 19–25, 21–9, 12–18, 19–19, Overtime: 4–14
| Pts: Marinović 15; Rebs: Jović 9 Asts: Marinović 8 | | Pts: Hammonds 21; Rebs: Redding, Wohlfarth-Bottermann 6 Asts: Redding 3 |

Jezero Hall, Kragujevac
Attendance: 3,150
Referees: Emilio Perez Pizarro (ESP), Emin Mogulkoc (TUR), Marius Ciulin (ROM)

15 January 2014
20:30 CET

Boxscore

| Strasbourg (France) | 72–78 | (Ukraine) Khimik Yuzhny |
Scoring by quarter: 19–11, 22–16, 13–25, 18–26
| Pts: Duport 20; Rebs: Duport 9 Asts: Campbell 4 | | Pts: Shuler 25; Rebs: Travis 7 Asts: Delaney 5 |

Rhénus Sport, Strasbourg
Attendance: 2,530
Referees: Jose Ramon Garcia Ortiz (ESP), Renaud Geller (BEL), Jurgis Laurinavicius (LTU)

=== Game 3 ===
22 January 2014
20:00 CET

Boxscore

| Alba Berlin (Germany) | 87–71 | (Ukraine) Khimik Yuzhny |
Scoring by quarter: 19–13, 19–28, 22–15, 27–15
| Pts: Radošević, Redding 15; Rebs: Redding, Vargas 5 Asts: Redding 7 | | Pts: Travis 24; Rebs: Travis 8 Asts: Shuler 6 |

O2 World, Berlin
Attendance: 6,204
Referees: Fernando Rocha (POR), Apostolos Kalpakas (SWE), Nick van den Broeck (BEL)

22 January 2014
20:30 CET

Boxscore

| Strasbourg (France) | 80–76 | (Serbia) Radnički Kragujevac |
Scoring by quarter: 17–17, 15–19, 27–23, 21–17
| Pts: Campbell 19; Rebs: Greer 10; Asts: Greer 7 | | Pts: Birčević 21; Rebs: Jović 5 Asts: Marinović 6 |

Rhénus Sport, Strasbourg
Attendance: 3,015
Referees: Carmelo Paternico (ITA), Luis Lopes (POR), Alexey Davydov (RUS)

=== Game 4 ===
29 January 2014
18:00 CET

Boxscore

| Radnički Kragujevac (Serbia) | 92–82 | (France) Strasbourg |
Scoring by quarter: 21–24, 25–18, 19–25, 27–15
| Pts: Dimić 19; Rebs: Birčević 6 Asts: Marinović 9 | | Pts: Thornton 21; Rebs: Andersen 6 Asts: Greer 4 |

Jezero Hall, Kragujevac
Attendance: 1,500
Referees: Robert Lottermoser (GER), Sergiy Chebyshev (UKR), Ersan Kartal (TUR)

30 January 2014
19:00 CET

Boxscore

| Khimik Yuzhny (Ukraine) | 65–68 (OT) | (Germany) Alba Berlin |
Scoring by quarter: 15–18, 13–17, 16–10, 15–14, Overtime: 6–9
| Pts: Freimanis 12; Rebs: Gatens 7 Asts: three players 3 | | Pts: Redding 15; Rebs: Kendall 11; Asts: Redding 5 |

FSC Olymp, Yuzhny
Attendance: 2,000
Referees: Paolo Taurino (ITA), Rustu Nuran (TUR), Oskars Lucis (LAT)

=== Game 5 ===
11 February 2014
20:30 CET

Boxscore

| Strasbourg (France) | 78–75 | (Germany) Alba Berlin |
Scoring by quarter: 21–15, 16–22, 15–20, 26–18
| Pts: Campbell 13; Rebs: Thornton 7 Asts: Campbell 7 | | Pts: Redding 18; Rebs: Kendall, King 6 Asts: Redding 3 |

Rhénus Sport, Strasbourg
Attendance: 4,535
Referees: Sasa Pukl (SLO), Robert Vyklicky (CZE), Benjamin Jimenez (ESP)

12 February 2014
18:00 CET

Boxscore

| Radnički Kragujevac (Serbia) | 86–68 | (Ukraine) Khimik Yuzhny |
Scoring by quarter: 25–14, 26–15, 20–22, 15–17
| Pts: Birčević 18; Rebs: Birčević 8 Asts: Marinović 13 | | Pts: Gatens 18; Rebs: Riabchuk 3 Asts: Delaney 4 |

Jezero Hall, Kragujevac
Attendance: 2,100
Referees: Marek Cmikiewicz (POL), Francisco Araña (ESP), Ioannis Foufis (GRE)

=== Game 6 ===
19 February 2014
17:00 CET

Boxscore

| Khimik Yuzhny (Ukraine) | 74–63 | (France) Strasbourg |
Scoring by quarter: 12–8, 24–22, 17–14, 21–19
| Pts: Shuler 16; Rebs: Travis 6 Asts: Delaney 5 | | Pts: Duport 18; Rebs: Duport 6 Asts: Diot 6 |

FSC Olymp, Yuzhny
Attendance: 1,000
Referees: Antonio Conde (ESP), Robert Vyklicky (CZE), josip Radojkovic (CRO)

19 February 2014
20:00 CET

Boxscore

| Alba Berlin (Germany) | 92–83 | (Serbia) Radnički Kragujevac |
Scoring by quarter: 2118, 25–15, 19–26, 27–24
| Pts: Logan 23; Rebs: Redding 10; Asts: Redding 5 | | Pts: Marinović 19; Rebs: Lešić 5 Asts: Marinović 10 |

O2 World, Berlin
Attendance: 7,910
Referees: Sergiy Zashchuk (UKR), Tomasz Trawicki (POL), Renaud Geller (BEL)
