= 2013–14 Euroleague Regular Season Group B =

Standings and Results for Group B of the Regular Season phase of the 2013–14 Euroleague basketball tournament.

== Standings ==
Key to colors
Top four places advance to Top 16
Bottom two teams enter 2013–14 Eurocup Basketball Last 32 round

Pos	Team	Pld	W	L	PF	PA	PD	Tie
1	(Spain) Real Madrid	10	10	0	889	652	+237	
2	(Italy) EA7 Milano	10	5	5	742	762	−20	1–1 (+5)
3	(Lithuania) Žalgiris	10	5	5	743	768	−25	1–1 (–5)
4	(Turkey) Anadolu Efes	10	4	6	741	767	−26	
5	(Germany) Brose Bamberg	10	3	7	756	829	−73	1–1 (+3)
6	(France) Strasbourg	10	3	7	705	798	−93	1–1 (–3)

== Fixtures and results ==
All times given below are in Central European Time.

=== Game 1 ===
16 October 2013
20:00

Boxscore

Brose Baskets (Germany)	84–70	(France) Strasbourg IG
Scoring by quarter: 16–21, 27–8, 23–16, 18–25
Pts: Smith 19; Rebs: Ford 7 Asts: Goldsberry 9		Pts: Ajinça 19; Rebs: Abromaitis, Duport 5 Asts: Ajinça, Diot 4

Stechert Arena, Bamberg
Attendance: 6,800
Referees: Vicente Bulto (ESP), Matej Boltauzer (SLO), Ioannis Foufis (GRE)

17 October 2013
20:00

Boxscore

Anadolu Efes (Turkey)	87–67	(Italy) Emporio Armani Milano
Scoring by quarter: 25–17, 17–18, 24–17, 21–15
Pts: Hopson, Savanović 22; Rebs: Gordon 6 Asts: Gordon 7		Pts: Langford 20; Rebs: Melli 9 Asts: three players 2

Abdi İpekçi Arena, Istanbul
Attendance: 3,179
Referees: Jose Ramon Garcia Ortiz (ESP), Milivoje Jovcic (SRB), Boris Shulga (UKR)

18 October 2013
18:45

Boxscore

Žalgiris Kaunas (Lithuania)	63–83	(Spain) Real Madrid
Scoring by quarter: 13–16, 11–19, 20–29, 19–19
Pts: Jankūnas 15; Rebs: Jankūnas 8 Asts: Milaknis 3		Pts: Mirotić 18; Rebs: Fernández 6 Asts: Fernández 9

Žalgiris Arena, Kaunas
Attendance: 11,600
Referees: Christos Christodoulou (GRE), Olegs Latisevs (LAT), Petri Mantyla (FIN)

=== Game 2 ===
24 October 2013
20:30

Boxscore

Emporio Armani Milano (Italy)	82–75	(Lithuania) Žalgiris Kaunas
Scoring by quarter: 25–19, 18–12, 20–27, 19–17
Pts: Melli 20; Rebs: Melli 9 Asts: Jerrells 6		Pts: Pocius, Jankūnas 16; Rebs: Javtokas 6 Asts: Jankūnas, Jasikevičius 4

Mediolanum Forum, Milan
Attendance: 4,126
Referees: Borys Ryzhyk (UKR), Antonio Conde (ESP), Milija Vojinovic (SRB)

24 October 2013
20:45

Boxscore

Real Madrid (Spain)	98–58	(Germany) Brose Baskets
Scoring by quarter: 18–7, 24–14, 31–18, 25–19
Pts: Llull 16; Rebs: Bourousis 10; Asts: Rodríguez 6		Pts: Smith 11; Rebs: Ford 8 Asts: Schmidt 4

Palacio de Deportes, Madrid
Attendance: 6,899
Referees: Fernando Rocha (POR), Nicola Maestre (FRA), Tomas Jasevicius (LTU)

25 October 2013
20:45

Boxscore

Strasbourg IG (France)	66–76	(Turkey) Anadolu Efes
Scoring by quarter: 12–22, 17–21, 20–15, 17–18
Pts: Ajinça 18; Rebs: Ajinça 9 Asts: Greer 5		Pts: Hopson 20; Rebs: Dragicevic 7 Asts: Gordon, Planinić 3

Rhénus Sport, Strasbourg
Attendance: 5,540
Referees: Dani Hierrenzuelo (ESP), Miguel Angel Perez Niz (ESP), Sergio Silva (POR)

=== Game 3 ===
31 October 2013
18:45

Boxscore

Žalgiris Kaunas (Lithuania)	88–64	(France) Strasbourg IG
Scoring by quarter: 19–16, 25–19, 26–16, 18–13
Pts: Pocius 23; Rebs: Vene 6 Asts: Pocius 5		Pts: Ajinça 21; Rebs: Greer 7 Asts: Greer 5

Žalgiris Arena, Kaunas
Attendance: 8,500
Referees: Luigi Lamonica (ITA), Marek Cmikiewicz (POL), Francisco Araña (ESP)

1 November 2013
20:00

Boxscore

Brose Baskets (Germany)	88–86	(Turkey) Anadolu Efes
Scoring by quarter: 23–24, 21–27, 26–17, 18–18
Pts: Jacobsen 23; Rebs: Ford, Zirbes 8 Asts: Goldsberry 8		Pts: Savanović 17; Rebs: Erden 5 Asts: Planinić 7

Stechert Arena, Bamberg
Attendance: 6,800
Referees: Miguel Perez Perez (ESP), Roberto Chiari (ITA), Haris Bijedic (BIH)

1 November 2013
20:45

Boxscore

Real Madrid (Spain)	93–74	(Italy) Emporio Armani Milano
Scoring by quarter: 25–20, 27–11, 21–18, 20–25
Pts: Mirotić 19; Rebs: Reyes 9 Asts: Rodríguez 6		Pts: Langford 17; Rebs: Moss 4 Asts: Langford 6

Palacio de Deportes, Madrid
Attendance: 10,719
Referees: Sreten Radovic (CRO), Robert Lottermoser (GER), Rustu Nuran (TUR)

=== Game 4 ===
7 November 2013
19:15

Boxscore

Brose Baskets (Germany)	62–76	(Italy) Emporio Armani Milano
Scoring by quarter: 18–20, 15–23, 18–13, 11–20
Pts: Wright 13; Rebs: Ford 12; Asts: Gavel 3		Pts: Gentile 18; Rebs: Langford 9 Asts: Gentile 6

Stechert Arena, Bamberg
Attendance: 6,800
Referees: Ilija Belosevic (SRB), Carlos Cortes (ESP), Igor Dragojevic (POR)

7 November 2013
19:45

Boxscore

Anadolu Efes (Turkey)	72–61	(Lithuania) Žalgiris Kaunas
Scoring by quarter: 27–27, 11–11, 13–11, 21–12
Pts: Hopson 15; Rebs: Erden 8 Asts: Gordon 5		Pts: Dentmon 14; Rebs: Jankūnas 11; Asts: Dentmon 5

Abdi İpekçi Arena, Istanbul
Attendance: 2,278
Referees: José Martín (ESP), Nicola Maestre (FRA), Sergiy Chebyshev (UKR)

7 November 2013
20:45

Boxscore

Strasbourg IG (France)	66–85	(Spain) Real Madrid
Scoring by quarter: 17–22, 14–24, 14–25, 21–14
Pts: Ajinça 23; Rebs: Ajinça 8 Asts: Campbell 6		Pts: Fernández 24; Rebs: Reyes 7 Asts: Rodríguez, Llull 5

Rhénus Sport, Strasbourg
Attendance: 6,150
Referees: Sasa Pukl (SLO), Panagiotis Anastopoulos (GRE), Jurgis Laurinavicius (LTU)

=== Game 5 ===
13 November 2013
20:45

Boxscore

Real Madrid (Spain)	103–57	(Turkey) Anadolu Efes
Scoring by quarter: 19–13, 28–10, 23–23, 33–11
Pts: Bourousis 17; Rebs: Reyes 10; Asts: S. Rodríguez 11		Pts: Hopson 13; Rebs: Gordon 5 Asts: Gordon 6

Palacio de Deportes, Madrid
Attendance: 8,882
Referees: Luigi Lamonica (ITA), Damir Javor (SLO), Sergiy Zashchuk (UKR)

14 November 2013
19:00

Boxscore

Žalgiris Kaunas (Lithuania)	91–81	(Germany) Brose Baskets
Scoring by quarter: 23–16, 16–23, 30–15, 22–27
Pts: Dentmon 24; Rebs: Jankūnas, Javtokas 9 Asts: Dentmon 9		Pts: Sanders, Smith 18; Rebs: Zirbes 6 Asts: Wright 7

Žalgiris Arena, Kaunas
Attendance: 10,000
Referees: Vicente Bulto (ESP), Luis Lopes (POR), Alexey Davydov (RUS)

15 November 2013
20:30

Boxscore

Emporio Armani Milano (Italy)	83–72	(France) Strasbourg IG
Scoring by quarter: 19–18, 15–10, 23–23, 26–21
Pts: Langford 25; Rebs: Melli 10; Asts: Gentile 6		Pts: Campbell 17; Rebs: Ajinça 11; Asts: Diot 5

Mediolanum Forum, Milan
Attendance: 5,514
Referees: Juan Carlos Arteaga (ESP), Murat Biricik (TUR), Petros Papapetrou (GRE)

=== Game 6 ===
22 November 2013
20:15

Boxscore

Strasbourg IG (France)	83–72	(Germany) Brose Baskets
Scoring by quarter: 17–14, 20–23, 25–15, 21–20
Pts: Greer 21; Rebs: Abromaitis, Greer 4 Asts: Campbell 8		Pts: Wright 13; Rebs: Ford 5 Asts: Gavel 5

Rhénus Sport, Strasbourg
Attendance: 3,750
Referees: Recep Ankarali (TUR), Antonio Conde (ESP), Mario Majkic (SLO)

22 November 2013
20:45

Boxscore

Emporio Armani Milano (Italy)	77–73	(Turkey) Anadolu Efes
Scoring by quarter: 21–23, 11–18, 19–21, 26–11
Pts: Langford 22; Rebs: three players 5 Asts: Jerrells, Moss 4		Pts: Savanović 14; Rebs: Erden 12; Asts: Planinić 5

Mediolanum Forum, Milan
Attendance: 6,563
Referees: Juan Carlos Garcia Gonzalex (ESP), Srdan Dozai (CRO), Benjamin Jimenez (ESP)

22 November 2013
20:45

Boxscore

Real Madrid (Spain)	95–67	(Lithuania) Žalgiris Kaunas
Scoring by quarter: 28–14, 28–18, 23–21, 16–14
Pts: Mirotić 17; Rebs: Bourousis 6 Asts: Fernández 7		Pts: Dentmon 16; Rebs: Jankūnas 8 Asts: Dentmon 4

Palacio de Deportes, Madrid
Attendance: 11,429
Referees: Ilija Belosevic (SRB), Spiros Gkontas (GRE), Marko Juras (SRB)

=== Game 7 ===
28 November 2013
20:45

Boxscore

Brose Baskets (Germany)	69–89	(Spain) Real Madrid
Scoring by quarter: 20-20, 18-23, 11-17, 20-29
Pts: Ford, Zirbes 12; Rebs: Ford 8 Asts: Smith 4		Pts: Mirotić 20; Rebs: Bourousis 12; Asts: Fernández 8

Stechert Arena, Bamberg
Attendance: 6,800
Referees: Tolga Sahin (ITA), Eddie Viator (FRA), Elias Koromilas (GRE)

29 November 2013
18:30

Boxscore

Žalgiris Kaunas (Lithuania)	73–71	(Italy) Emporio Armani Milano
Scoring by quarter: 17–17, 22–14, 21–19, 13–21
Pts: Dentmon 15; Rebs: Jankūnas 11; Asts: Dentmon, Jasikevičius 5		Pts: Langford 29; Rebs: Langford, Melli 6 Asts: Jerrells 6

Žalgiris Arena, Kaunas
Attendance: 11,500
Referees: Miguel Perez Perez (ESP), Jakub Zamojski (POL), Miroslav Tomov (BUL)

29 November 2013
19:15

Boxscore

Anadolu Efes (Turkey)	88–65	(France) Strasbourg IG
Scoring by quarter: 24–12, 22–17, 23–20, 19–16
Pts: Hopson 23; Rebs: Erden 9 Asts: Gordon, Savanović 7		Pts: Ajinça 21; Rebs: Ajinça 6 Asts: Campbell 4

Abdi İpekçi Arena, Istanbul
Attendance: 3,692
Referees: Robert Lottermoser (GER), Radomir Vojinovic (SRB), Apostolos Kalpakas (SWE)

=== Game 8 ===
5 December 2013
20:45

Boxscore

Emporio Armani Milano (Italy)	71–78	(Spain) Real Madrid
Scoring by quarter: 19–23, 15–25, 12–15, 25–15
Pts: Gentile 14; Rebs: Chiotti 8 Asts: Jerrells, Gentile 4		Pts: Fernández 16; Rebs: Mejri 7 Asts: Llull 7

Mediolanum Forum, Milan
Attendance: 12,284
Referees: Sreten Radovic (CRO), Petar Obradovic (BIH), Marcin Kowalski (POL)

5 December 2013
20:45

Boxscore

Strasbourg IG (France)	77–76	(Lithuania) Žalgiris Kaunas
Scoring by quarter: 18–18, 19–24, 16–9, 24–25
Pts: Greer 16; Rebs: Greer 7 Asts: Diot 7		Pts: Dentmon 18; Rebs: Jankūnas 7 Asts: Jasikevičius 5

Rhénus Sport, Strasbourg
Attendance: 3,340
Referees: Juan Carlos Arteaga (ESP), Srdan Dozai (CRO), Haris Bijedic (BIH)

6 December 2013
19:45

Boxscore

Anadolu Efes (Turkey)	78–89	(Germany) Brose Baskets
Scoring by quarter: 18–18, 32–18, 14–21, 14–32
Pts: Vasileiadis 18; Rebs: Hopson 7 Asts: Planinić 6		Pts: Smith 18; Rebs: Sanders 7 Asts: Wright 7

Abdi İpekçi Arena, Istanbul
Attendance: 4,032
Referees: Guerrino Cerebuch (ITA), Sinisa Herceg (CRO), Anastasios Piloidis (GRE)

=== Game 9 ===
12 December 2013
18:00

Boxscore

Žalgiris Kaunas (Lithuania)	65–63	(Turkey) Anadolu Efes
Scoring by quarter: 16–16, 18–20, 28–16, 3–11
Pts: Dentmon 23; Rebs: Javtokas 10; Asts: Dentmon, Jankūnas 3		Pts: Erden 14; Rebs: Erden 13; Asts: Gordon 3

Žalgiris Arena, Kaunas
Attendance: 11,000
Referees: Sasa Pukl (SLO), Emilio Perez Pizarro (ESP), Joseph Bissang (FRA)

13 December 2013
20:30

Boxscore

Emporio Armani Milano (Italy)	74–73	(Germany) Brose Baskets
Scoring by quarter: 20–23, 17–11, 14–18, 23–21
Pts: Lawal 17; Rebs: Lawal 10; Asts: Langford 4		Pts: Gavel 15; Rebs: Zirbes 7 Asts: Goldsberry 3

PalaDesio, Desio
Attendance: 6,559
Referees: Milivoje Jovcic (SRB), Spiros Gkontas (GRE), Nicola Maestre (FRA)

13 December 2013
20:45

Boxscore

Real Madrid (Spain)	79–66	(France) Strasbourg IG
Scoring by quarter: 19–16, 34–16, 14–10, 12–24
Pts: Mirotić 22; Rebs: three players 3 Asts: Rodríguez 5		Pts: Diot 17; Rebs: Duport 7 Asts: Campbell 7

Palacio de Deportes, Madrid
Attendance: 7,187
Referees: Borys Ryzhyk (UKR), Sasa Maricic (SRB), Aare Halliko (FIN)

=== Game 10 ===
19 December 2013
19:00

Boxscore

Anadolu Efes (Turkey)	61–86	(Spain) Real Madrid
Scoring by quarter: 20–18, 14–20, 15–16, 12–32
Pts: Savanović 20; Rebs: Erden 7 Asts: Gordon 3		Pts: Rodríguez 24; Rebs: Reyes 10; Asts: Rodríguez 5

Abdi İpekçi Arena, Istanbul
Attendance: 6,934
Referees: Luigi Lamonica (ITA), Olegs Latisevs (LAT), Damir Javor (SLO)

19 December 2013
20:00

Boxscore

Brose Baskets (Germany)	80–84	(Lithuania) Žalgiris Kaunas
Scoring by quarter: 28–21, 15–23, 26–16, 11–24
Pts: Gavel 16; Rebs: Zirbes 7 Asts: Gavel 8		Pts: Dentmon 26; Rebs: Dentmon 7 Asts: Dentmon 4

Stechert Arena, Bamberg
Attendance: 6,800
Referees: Matej Boltauzer (SLO), Fernando Rocha (POR), Juan Carlos Garcia Gonzalez (ESP)

20 December 2013
20:45

Boxscore

Strasbourg IG (France)	76–67	(Italy) Emporio Armani Milano
Scoring by quarter: 22–15, 16–15, 25–22, 13–15
Pts: Abromaitis 23; Rebs: Duport 9 Asts: Diot 5		Pts: Jerrells 17; Rebs: Gigli 7 Asts: Melli, Jerrells 3

Rhénus Sport, Strasbourg
Attendance: 3,935
Referees: Vicente Bulto (ESP), Miguel Angel Perez Niz (ESP), Petros Papapetrou (GRE)
