= Xu Yong =

Xu Yong may refer to:

- Xu Yong (historian) (徐勇, born 1949)
- Xu Yong (general) (许勇; 1959-2024)
- Eric Xu or Xu Yong (徐勇, born 1964), co-founder of Baidu
- Xu Yong (basketball) (born 1989)
- Xu Yong, photographer and co-founder of the 798 Art Zone
- Xu Yong (徐勇, born 1955), Chinese doctor, member of the Eleventh CPPCC National Committee

== See also ==
- Xuyong County
