= Miguel Martinez (basketball) =

Lebanese basketball player

No. 1 – Beirut Club
- Position: Point guard
- League: Lebanese Basketball League

Personal information
- Born: 30 January 1988 (age 38) Beirut, Lebanon
- Listed height: 1.88 m (6 ft 2 in)
- Listed weight: 78 kg (172 lb)

Career information
- Playing career: 2005–present

Career history
- 2005–2009: Blue Stars
- 2009–2011: Champville
- 2011–2012: Sagesse
- 2012–2015: Al Riyadi Club Beirut
- 2015–2017: Louaize Club
- 2017–2018: Beirut Club
- 2019–2020: Al Riyadi Club Beirut
- 2020–2021: JAC Sants
- 2021–2022: Champville SC
- 2022–2023: Al Riyadi Club Beirut
- 2023–2025: Beirut Club
- 2025–2026: CS Antonine
- 2026–present: Beirut Club

Career highlights
- 2× LBL champion (2014, 2015)

Miguel Raymondo Martinez (born 30 January 1988) is a Spanish-Lebanese professional basketball player for Beirut Club of the Lebanese Basketball League (LBL). He was a member of the Lebanese national team.

== Professional career ==
Martinez started his pro career with Blue Stars in 2005, before moving to Champville in 2009 for a two-year stint. He then spent one season playing for Sagesse, and three seasons playing for Sporting Al Riyadi Beirut. For the 2015–16 season, he joined Louaize Club for 2 seasons . In 2017 he joined the newly promoted team Beirut Sporting Club. In September 2019, he inked with Sporting Al Riyadi Beirut.

== National team career ==
Martinez was a member of the Lebanese youth national team that participated in the 2007 FIBA Under-19 World Championship In 2011, he played for the senior national team at the 2011 FIBA Asia Championship.
