= Jad Bitar =

Lebanese basketball player (born 1988)

No. 75 – Leaders Club
- Position: Center
- League: Lebanese Basketball League

Personal information
- Born: April 8, 1988 (age 38) Beirut, Lebanon
- Listed height: 2.06 m (6 ft 9 in)
- Listed weight: 120 kg (265 lb)

Career information
- Playing career: 2008–present

Career history
- 2008–2009: Blue Stars
- 2009–2011: Al Mouttahed Tripoli
- 2011–2012: Sagesse
- 2012–2013: Amchit Club
- 2013–2014: Tadamon Zouk
- 2015–2018: Louaize Club
- 2018–2022: Sagesse
- 2022–present: Leaders Club

Jad Bitar (born 8 April 1988 in Beirut) is a Lebanese professional basketball center for Leaders Club of the Lebanese Basketball League.

== Professional career ==
Jad had previously made previously played for Amchit Club as a replacing centre for Hassan Whiteside in the 2012–13 season. In 2014, due to the appearance of Tadamon Zouk, Jad was selected to play as a local centre for the club alongside Jarrid Famous. Jad had also competed for the Lebanon national basketball team in the 2011 FIBA Asia Championship in Wuhan and also the 2012 William Jones Cup. Since then Jad had not been called up to any national team appearance.
