= CSM Târgu Mureș (men's basketball) =

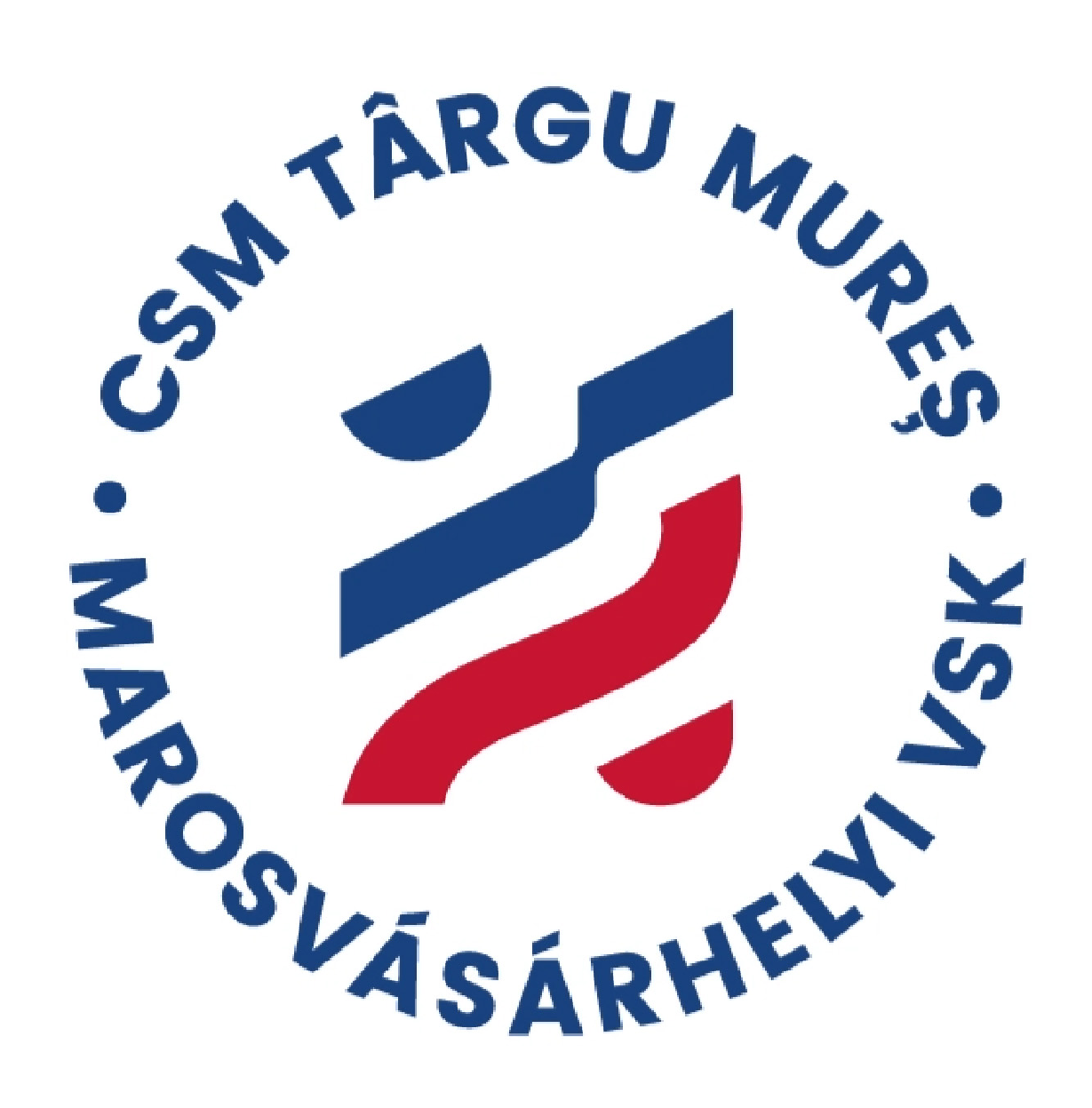
- Nickname: Mureșenii (The People from Mureș County)
- Leagues: Liga Națională
- Founded: 2018; 8 years ago
- Arena: Sala Sporturilor
- Capacity: 2,000
- Location: Târgu-Mureș, Romania
- Team colours: White, Blue, Red
- President: Barnabás Szászgáspár
- Head coach: Péter Faragó
- Website: www.csmtgm.ro
| Home | Away |

Clubul Sportiv Municipal Târgu Mureș, commonly known as CSM Târgu Mureș, is a Romanian basketball club based in Târgu Mureș, which currently participates in the Liga Națională, the top-tier league in Romania. The team represents the basketball men's section of CSM Târgu Mureș, a multi-sports club, founded in 2017 by the decision of the local council of Târgu Mureș, in order to reinvigorate the sport from the city, which was in crisis at that time.

== History ==
The merger between the Liga Națională (the top tier of Romanian basketball) and Liga I (the second tier) after the 2017-18 season meant that CSM Târgu Mureș was going to start its existence directly in the top flight. George Trif was appointed as head coach to the team, which was formed mostly from local players. CSM Târgu Mureș finished the 2018-19 season in eleventh, way clear of the relegation zone, but financial difficulties within the club meant that they chose to withdraw from the Liga Națională for the 2019-20 season and enter the second tier. The team had a dominant 2021-22 season on the court, losing only once all season in order to be promoted back to the top tier. Mureșenii had a difficult start to the new campaign, which included five losses in six games in November, ultimately failing to qualify for the Championship round. A string of wins during the later stages of the campaign meant that CSM finished the 2022-23 season in eleventh once again.

== Season by season ==
| Season | Tier | Division | Pos. | W–L | Romanian Cup | European competitions |
|---|---|---|---|---|---|---|
| 2019–20 | 2 | Liga I | Cancelled due to the COVID-19 pandemic | | - | |
| 2021–22 | 2 | Liga I | 1st (P) | 24–1 | - | |
| 2022–23 | 1 | Liga Națională | 11th | 18–13 | Preliminary Stage | |
| 2023–24 | 1 | Liga Națională | 10th | 16–18 | Quarterfinalist | |
| 2024–25 | 1 | Liga Națională | 10th | 13–17 | Semifinalist | |

== Current roster ==
Note: Flags indicate national team eligibility at FIBA-sanctioned events. Players may hold other non-FIBA nationalities not displayed.

CSM Târgu Mureș roster
Players
Coaches

| Pos. | No. | Nat. | Name | Ht. | Age |
|---|---|---|---|---|---|
| PF | 0 | (Romania) | Mureșan, Andrei Cristian | 1.98 m (6 ft 6 in) | 22 – 30 August 2003 |
| G/F | 1 | (Serbia) | Jeremic, Mladen | 1.95 m (6 ft 5 in) | 38 – 9 January 1988 |
| G | 2 | (Romania) | Bot, Robert | 1.80 m (5 ft 11 in) | 21 – 23 November 2004 |
| F | 4 | (Romania) | Blaga, Răducu | 1.95 m (6 ft 5 in) | 21 – 7 February 2005 |
| SF | 5 | (Romania) | Nistor, Vlad | 1.81 m (5 ft 11 in) | 21 – 7 February 2005 |
| PG | 7 | (Montenegro) | Martinić, Goran | 1.87 m (6 ft 2 in) | 38 – 19 May 1987 |
| G/F | 8 | (Romania) | Paliciuc, Radu | 1.98 m (6 ft 6 in) | 37 – 13 September 1988 |
| PG | 9 | (Romania) | Bölöni, Tamás | 1.76 m (5 ft 9 in) | 28 – 19 November 1997 |
| C | 10 | (Romania) | Sánta, Szabolcs (C) | 2.09 m (6 ft 10 in) | 38 – 11 May 1987 |
| PF | 11 | (Romania) | Borșa, Alin | 2.01 m (6 ft 7 in) | 35 – 22 July 1990 |
| G | 13 | (Romania) | Trif, Robert | 1.85 m (6 ft 1 in) | 20 – 1 May 2006 |
| SG | 15 | (Romania) | Sólyom, Botond | 1.93 m (6 ft 4 in) | 27 – 5 March 1999 |
| SF | 17 | (Montenegro) | Gajović, Goran | 1.99 m (6 ft 6 in) | 38 – 9 March 1988 |
| SF | 32 | (Romania) | Szilveszter, Botond | 1.95 m (6 ft 5 in) | 23 – 1 August 2002 |
| PG | 33 | (Romania) | Rosenfeld, David Engi | 1.87 m (6 ft 2 in) | 28 – 2 September 1997 |
| F/C | 42 | (United States) | Lowrance, Jakob | 2.06 m (6 ft 9 in) | 29 – 2 April 1997 |
| G | 52 | (Sweden) | Person, Jonathan | 1.91 m (6 ft 3 in) | 33 – 10 February 1993 |
| F | 77 | (Romania) | Kiss, Roland | 1.91 m (6 ft 3 in) | 19 – 23 September 2006 |

Head coach

- (Romania) Trif, George

Assistant coach(es)

- (Romania) Pora, Vlad

Legend

- (C) Team captain
- Injured

- Roster
Updated: 11 November 2023

=== Depth chart ===
| Pos. | Starting 5 | Bench 1 | Bench 2 | Bench 3 |
|---|---|---|---|---|
| C | Szabolcs Sánta | Jakob Lowrance |
| PF | Alin Borșa | Andrei Cristian Mureșan | Botond Szilveszter | Răducu Blaga |
| SF | Goran Gajović | Radu Paliciuc | Vlad Nistor | Roland Kiss |
| SG | Mladen Jeremić | Tamás Bölöni | Botond Sólyom | Robert Trif |
| PG | Jonathan Person | Goran Martinić | David Engi Rosenfeld | Robert Bot |
