= Goran Gajović =

Montenegrin basketball player

No. 11 – Piteşti
- Position: Small forward
- League: Liga Națională

Personal information
- Born: 9 March 1988 (age 38) Zagreb, SR Croatia, Yugoslavia
- Listed height: 1.99 m (6 ft 6 in)
- Listed weight: 95 kg (209 lb)

Career information
- NBA draft: 2010: undrafted
- Playing career: 2005–present

Career history
- 2005–2008: Ibon Nikšić
- 2008–2009: Primorje Herceg Novi
- 2009–2010: Danilovgrad
- 2010–2012: HEO Bileća
- 2012: Sutjeska
- 2012–2014: Igokea
- 2014: Feni Industries
- 2014–2016: BC Mureș
- 2016–2017: Sutjeska
- 2017: Dijon
- 2017-2018: CSM Oradea
- 2018-2019: SCM U Craiova
- 2019-2022: BCM U Pitești
- 2022-presents: CSM Târgu Mureș

Career highlights
- Romanian League champion (2017)

Goran Gajović (born 9 March 1988) is a Montenegrin professional basketball player who currently plays for CSM Târgu Mureș of the Liga Națională.
