= CSM Târgu Mureș =

Multi-section sports club

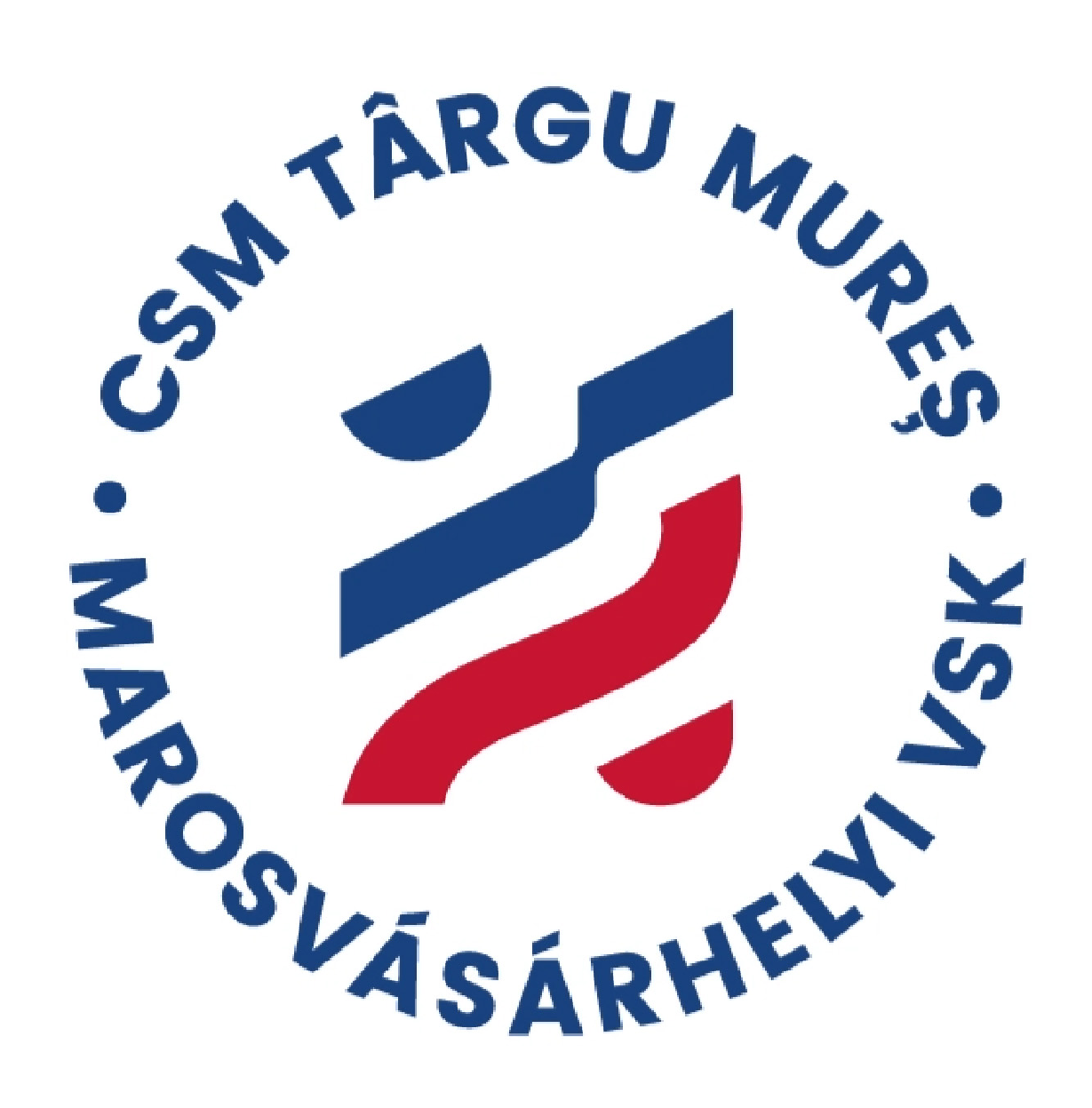
- Full name: Clubul Sportiv Municipal Târgu Mureș/Marosvásárhelyi Városi Sportklub
- Nickname: Mureșul! Vásárhely!
- Founded: 19 December 2017; 8 years ago
- Colours: White, Blue, Red
- President: Barnabás Szászgáspár
- Website: www.csmtgm.ro

Clubul Sportiv Municipal Târgu Mureș is a Romanian multi-sport club based in Târgu Mureș, Romania.

== History ==
The club was founded on 19 December 2017 by the decision of the local council of Târgu Mureș and began its activity in the summer of 2018 in order to bring back to life the sport from the city, which almost totally collapsed during the 2017–18 season. The first sections set up at the new club were: football, basketball, handball, volleyball, futsal, swimming, wrestling, bowling, athletics, tennis, table tennis, martial arts, motorsport, weightlifting, cycling, water polo, and fencing. From 2021, after reorganization of the club, CSM Targu Mures has 12 sections

=== Archery ===
One of the Romanian young archers, Móréh Tamás continues his career under the colour of CSM Targu Mures. The club managed to bring him home from another club from Romania.

=== Athletics ===
Headcoach: Buhlea Gheorghe

=== Basketball ===
The men's basketball section was established following the dissolution of previous local teams. The team was formed with former local National League players, all but two of whom were born in Mureș. The team's coach was Trif George. The team was promoted to the Liga Naţională following the 2021-2022 Liga I season.

=== Boxing ===
Headcoach: Daniel Ghiurca

=== Futsal ===
The futsal team of CSM want to continue the tradition of the sport, Târgu Mureş was a six time Romanian champion and Cup winner, who also played in Futsal UEFA Cup, the Champions League of this sport. Coach: Kacso Endre

=== Handball ===
The handball section was founded to supplement the space left by the disappearance of the old club, SC Mureșul, also dissolved during the 2017–18 season. Now the club has a junior III women team. Headcoach Pop Laurentiu.

=== Ice hockey ===
The newest sport in town, which also have a very long history early 1950-1990, was revived in 2021. CSM Targu Mures manage a U14 team. Head of department: Kui Csaba

=== Nine pin bowling ===
Men's and women's nine pins bowling section of CSM continue the tradition of this sport in town. Coaches: Seres József and Orosz István

=== Swimming ===
CSM Targu Mures provides continuity for swimmers who have outgrown their youth category and have nowhere to continue their careers in the city. Headcoah: Bartalis Károly

=== Water polo ===
CSM Targu Mures embraced the senior and U19 women teams. Th U19 team finished in second place in National Championship, and it's the third team in the Mures County DJTS (Directia Nationala de Tineret si Sport) 2021 annual ranking in olympic sport teams category. Headcoach: Ispir Cristian

=== Wrestling ===
The CSM Târgu Mureș wrestling department includes several national and international titleholders. In the 2021 Mureș County DJTS rankings, Bíró Krisztián placed third in the senior category, and Lircă Georgiana was ranked as the top junior athlete. The club's wrestling team won national titles at the U17 and U20 levels and finished second in the senior Superliga in collaboration with CSS Târgu Mureș. The department is headed by Gyarmati Ferenc.
