= Mladen Jeremić =

Serbian basketball player

No. 4 – Rapid București
- Position: Shooting guard / small forward
- League: Liga Națională

Personal information
- Born: January 9, 1988 (age 38) Loznica, SR Serbia, SFR Yugoslavia
- Listed height: 1.98 m (6 ft 6 in)
- Listed weight: 88 kg (194 lb)

Career information
- NBA draft: 2010: undrafted
- Playing career: 2006–present

Career history
- 2006–2007: Borac Čačak
- 2007–2010: FMP Železnik
- 2010–2012: Hemofarm
- 2012–2013: Trenkwalder Reggio Emilia
- 2014: Bucaneros de La Guaira
- 2014: Igokea
- 2015: Metalac Farmakom
- 2015–2016: Vršac
- 2016–2018: BC Timișoara
- 2018–2019: BCM U Pitesti
- 2019–2020: CS Dinamo București
- 2020–2022: BCM U Pitești
- 2022–2023: Rapid București
- 2023–present: CSM Târgu Mureș
Medals
Men's basketball
Representing Serbia
Universiade
Gold medal – first place	2011 Shenzhen	Team competition
U20 European Championship
Gold medal – first place	2008 Latvia	Team
U19 World Championship
Gold medal – first place	2007 Serbia	Team
Representing Serbia and Montenegro
U20 European Championship
Bronze medal – third place	2005 Russia	Team

Mladen Jeremić (Serbian: Младен Јеремић, born January 9, 1988) is a Serbian professional basketball player for Rapid București of the Liga Națională. He is a 1.98 m (6 ft 6 in) tall swingman, also capable of running point guard.

== Professional career ==
Jeremić started his pro career with Borac Čačak and later played for FMP Železnik and Hemofarm. In August 2012, he signed a 2+1 deal with Trenkwalder Reggio Emilia of the Italian Serie A. After one season he left the Italian club. In January 2014, he signed with the Venezuelan team Bucaneros de La Guaira for the 2014 LPB season.

In July 2014, he signed with Igokea. In December 2014, he left Igokea after averaging 7.3 points and 2.2 assists per game in the ABA League. In March 2015, he signed with Metalac Farmakom for the rest of the season.

In September 2015, he signed with KK Vršac. In January 2016, he left Vršac and signed with BC Timișoara of the Romanian Liga Națională.

== Serbian national team ==
Jeremić played for the Serbian U-19 team as they won the 2007 FIBA Under-19 World Championship, as the host nation. He continued with national team success as a part of the U-20 team, winning the gold medal at the 2008 FIBA Europe Under-20 Championship in Latvia. Jeremić was also a member of the team that represented Serbia at the 2011 Summer Universiade in Shenzhen, finishing as the gold medal winners.
