= Petar Despotović =

Serbian basketball player

Žarkovo
- Position: Point guard
- League: Second League of Serbia

Personal information
- Born: 26 August 1988 (age 38) Pljevlja, SR Montenegro, FR Yugoslavia
- Listed height: 1.95 m (6 ft 5 in)

Career information
- NBA draft: 2010: undrafted
- Playing career: 2005–present

Career history
- 2005–2010: Hemofarm
- 2006–2007: → Mega Ishrana
- 2007–2008: → Swisslion Vršac
- 2010–2011: Hercegovac Bileća
- 2011–2015: Konstantin
- 2015–2016: Mornar Bar
- 2016: Vršac
- 2016–2017: MBK Handlová
- 2018: Dunav
- 2018–present: Žarkovo
Medals
Men's basketball
Representing Serbia
U20 European Championship
Gold medal – first place	2008 Latvia	U20 Team
U19 World Championship
Gold medal – first place	2007 Serbia	U19 Team

Petar Despotović (born 26 August 1988) is a Serbian professional basketball player for Žarkovo of the Second League of Serbia.
