= Kerem Özkan =

Turkish basketball player (born 1988)

Free Agent
- Position: Small forward

Personal information
- Born: November 19, 1988 (age 37) Ankara, Turkey
- Listed height: 6 ft 6.75 in (2.00 m)
- Listed weight: 205 lb (93 kg)

Career information
- Playing career: 2006–present

Career history
- 2006–2007: Beşiktaş Cola Turka
- 2007–2008: FMV Işıkspor
- 2008–2009: Eyüpspor
- 2009–2010: Beşiktaş Cola Turka
- 2010–2011: Oyak Renault
- 2011–2012: Trabzonspor
- 2012–2013: Vestel
- 2013–2014: TED Ankara Kolejliler
- 2014–2015: Adanaspor Basketbol
- 2015–2018: Sakarya BB
- 2018–2020: Büyükçekmece

Kerem Özkan (born 19 November 1988) is a Turkish professional basketball player, who lastly played for Büyükçekmece of Turkish Super League (BSL).
