= Choi Jin-soo =

South Korean basketball player (born 1989)

Personal information
- Born: May 11, 1989 (age 37) Suwon, South Korea
- Listed height: 6 ft 8 in (2.03 m)
- Listed weight: 195 lb (88 kg)

Career information
- High school: South Kent School (South Kent, Connecticut)
- College: Maryland (2008–2010)
- NBA draft: 2011: undrafted
- Position: Small forward

- Choi Jin-soo
- Hangul: 최진수
- RR: Choe Jinsu
- MR: Ch'oe Chinsu

Former name
- Hangul: 김진수
- RR: Gim Jinsu
- MR: Kim Chinsu

Choi Jin-soo (Korean: 최진수, formerly known as Jin Soo Kim; born 11 May 1989) is a South Korean basketball player who played for University of Maryland, College Park and the Korea national basketball team. He is the first South Korean to receive a full NCAA Division I basketball scholarship.

He is listed as a small forward but he is able to play shooting guard, power forward, and center. Usually, he plays small forward in the United States, and power forward when he plays for the Korea national basketball team.

He came to the United States as a high school freshman in 2004. As a freshman, he was a starting forward for Montclair Prep. He transferred to South Kent for his sophomore year. At South Kent, he played for three years as a Forward. In October 2007, he verbally committed to the University of Maryland. He graduated from South Kent in 2008, and became a freshman at the University of Maryland, College Park.

In Choi's first game as a Terrapin, he scored 20 points in an exhibition vs. Northwood University. Choi immediately became a fan favorite of the Maryland students, as they were cheering his name by the end of the game.

On January 27, 2009, Choi was declared academically ineligible. Maryland appealed the decision to the NCAA and he was reinstated a few days later.

During the 2009 offseason, Choi changed his name from Kim to Choi. He did this to acknowledge his stepfather. Choi's biological father Kim Yoo-taek was a well-known South Korean basketball player and former Korea national basketball team coach.

On January 5, 2010, it was announced that Choi was leaving the University of Maryland. He cited difficulties in playing basketball and taking academic classes at the same time as reasons for his departure. Choi was drafted third in the 2011 KBL Korean Basketball League draft to the Goyang Orions.
