= Andrew Ogilvy =

Australian professional basketball player (born 1988)

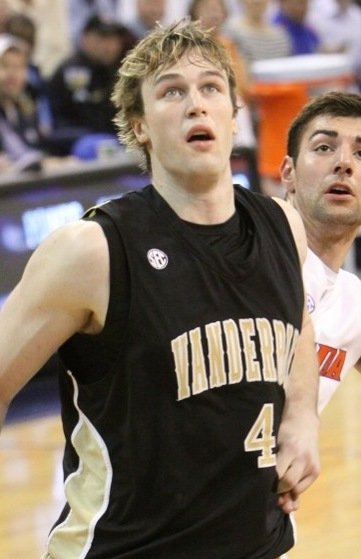
- Ogilvy with the Vanderbilt Commodores in 2010

Personal information
- Born: 17 June 1988 (age 38) Sydney, New South Wales
- Listed height: 211 cm (6 ft 11 in)
- Listed weight: 115 kg (254 lb)

Career information
- High school: Oakhill College (Sydney, New South Wales)
- College: Vanderbilt (2007–2010)
- NBA draft: 2010: undrafted
- Playing career: 2005–2022
- Position: Center

Career history
- 2005–2007: Australian Institute of Sport
- 2010–2011: Beşiktaş
- 2011–2012: Valencia
- 2012–2013: Brose Baskets
- 2013–2014: Sydney Kings
- 2014–2015: Manresa
- 2015–2022: Illawarra Hawks
- 2016: Atenienses de Manatí
- 2017: Azad University Tehran
- 2019: Hills Hornets
- 2019: Rockhampton Rockets
- 2020: Iraklis
- 2022: Hills Hornets

Career highlights
- 3× All-NBL First Team (2014, 2016, 2017); BBL champion (2013); TBL All-Star (2011); 3× Second-team All-SEC (2008–2010); SEC All-Freshman Team (2008)

Andrew James "A.J." Ogilvy (born 17 June 1988) is an Australian former professional basketball player. He played three seasons of college basketball for Vanderbilt before playing in Europe for the first three years of his professional career. After a season in his hometown with the Sydney Kings, he returned to Spain for a second stint. In 2015, he joined the Illawarra Hawks and helped lead them to a grand final appearance in 2017. After seven seasons with the Hawks, he retired from the National Basketball League (NBL) in 2022.

== Early life ==
Born in Sydney, New South Wales, Ogilvy attended Oakhill College in the Sydney suburb of Castle Hill. He grew up playing basketball for the Hills Hornets in Sydney's northwest. Between 2005 and 2007, Ogilvy attended the Australian Institute of Sport (AIS) in Canberra and played for the AIS men's team in the South East Australian Basketball League (SEABL).

== College career ==
In 2007, Ogilvy moved to the United States to play college basketball for Vanderbilt University. In his collegiate debut against Austin Peay on 10 November, Ogilvy had 18 points and nine rebounds, recording the best start for a VU freshman since Phil Cox scored 30 points to open the season in the 1981–82 campaign. He was named to South Padre Invitational All-Tournament team after averaging 16.5 points and 4.0 rebounds per game. He scored a career-high 27 points and made a career-high 12 field goals in Vanderbilt's SEC tournament win over Auburn on 13 March. He played in 34 games and started 33, scoring in double digits in 32 games and surpassing the 20-point barrier 11 times. He also had four double-doubles on the season and finished with averages of 17.0 points, 6.7 rebounds, 1.2 assists and 1.4 blocks in 26.4 minutes per game. He set a new Vanderbilt freshman scoring record with 578 points and led all freshman in the SEC in scoring at 17.0 points per game. His 49 blocks on the season is the fourth most in a season in Vanderbilt history and the most in a season since Chris Woods blocked 50 shots in the 1994–95 season. He was subsequently named to the SEC All-Freshman Team and earned second-team All-SEC.

As a sophomore in 2008–09, Ogilvy played in 29 games and started 28, averaging 15.4 points, 7.1 rebounds, 1.3 assists and 1.7 blocks in 27.6 minutes per game. He posted the team's highest rebound average since 2006, when Julian Terrell had 7.2 rebounds per game. He was named the Cancun Challenge MVP after averaging 19 points and five rebounds in the final two games of tournament, including a 25-point performance against VCU on 30 November. He scored a then career-high 28 points in win over South Carolina on 28 February. He set a new career high with 33 points in win over LSU on 4 March, becoming the first VU sophomore to reach the 1,000-point plateau. At the season's end, he was a second-team All-SEC selection by the league's coaches and an honorable mention pick by the league's media as a sophomore.

As a junior in 2009–10, Ogilvy averaged 13.4 points, 6.2 rebounds, 1.0 steals and 1.5 blocks in 33 games, with 28 starts. He subsequently earned second-team All-SEC selection for the third straight year and was named to the NABC All-District (21) Second Team. During the season, he became only the second player in Commodore history to record 1,000 points and 100 blocks in his career.

In April 2010, Ogilvy declared for the NBA draft, forgoing his final year of college eligibility. He finished his career at Vanderbilt as the Commodores' all-time leader in free throws made (471) and blocks per game (1.51).

== Professional career ==
After going undrafted in the 2010 NBA draft, Ogilvy played for the Chicago Bulls at the 2010 NBA Summer League in Las Vegas. Ogilvy went on to forge a career in Europe, spending the 2010–11 season in Turkey with Beşiktaş, the 2011–12 season in Spain with Valencia, and the 2012–13 season in Germany with Brose Baskets.

On 16 April 2013, Ogilvy signed with his hometown team the Sydney Kings for the 2013–14 NBL season. He led the league in rebounds (8.7 per game) and blocks (65), and scored 13.1 points per game to earn his selection to the All-NBL First Team.

Ogilvy returned to Spain for the 2014–15 season, joining Manresa. His season was cut short by a foot injury.

Ogilvy returned to Australia in 2015 and joined the Illawarra Hawks. He played the next seven seasons with the Hawks, which included reaching the 2017 NBL Grand Final series and serving as team captain in 2020–21 and 2021–22. Ogilvy announced his retirement from the NBL on 7 August 2022.

Ogilvy had a number of off-season stints, including 2016 in Puerto Rico with Atenienses de Manatí, 2017 in Iran with Azad University Tehran, 2019 with Hills Hornets (Waratah League) and Rockhampton Rockets (QBL), 2020 in Greece with Iraklis, and 2022 with the Hills Hornets in the NBL1 East.

== Personal life ==
Ogilvy is a dual citizen of Australia and Ireland, having obtained an Irish passport in 2011.

In January 2026, Ogilvy came out as gay in a one-to-one interview with Isaac Humphries, who became the NBL's first openly gay player in 2022. During the interview, Ogilvy revealed that he met his now-husband during the 2013–14 season while playing in Sydney, and that they married in 2024.

== Career statistics ==
Legend
GP	Games played	GS	Games started	MPG	Minutes per game
FG%	Field goal percentage	3P%	3-point field goal percentage	FT%	Free throw percentage
RPG	Rebounds per game	APG	Assists per game	SPG	Steals per game
BPG	Blocks per game	PPG	Points per game	**Bold**	Career high

=== College ===
Year	Team	GP	GS	MPG	FG%	3P%	FT%	RPG	APG	SPG	BPG	PPG
2007–08	Vanderbilt	**34**	**33**	26.4	**.588**	.000	**.769**	6.7	1.2	.7	1.4	**17.0**
2008–09	Vanderbilt	29	28	**27.6**	.543	**.259**	.699	**7.1**	**1.3**	.9	**1.7**	15.4
2009–10	Vanderbilt	33	28	23.2	.509	–	.730	6.2	.9	**1.0**	1.5	13.4
Career		96	89	25.6	.549	.241	.734	6.7	1.1	.9	1.5	15.3
