= Xu Yong (basketball) =

Chinese basketball player

Personal information
- Born: March 30, 1989 (age 37) Shanghai, China
- Listed height: 6 ft 8 in (2.03 m)
- Listed weight: 220 lb (100 kg)

Career information
- Playing career: 2004–2008
- Position: Small forward

Xu Yong (Chinese: 徐咏; born March 30, 1989) is a former Chinese professional basketball player born in Shanghai, China. He last played for the Shanghai Dongfang Sharks of the Chinese Basketball Association. Xu Yong was often considered as one of China's major basketball talents, third only to Yao Ming and Yi Jianlian. After several dominating performances in the Chinese Basketball Association. Xu had to end his basketball career at age 19 after being diagnosed with osteosarcoma.

== Career overview ==
Xu Yong came out of the youth program of Yao Ming's Shanghai Dongfang Sharks. He caught the attention of many experts through his MVP award at the Adidas Asia Camp in 2005. Later, he played for The Bush School in Seattle. At the 2007 FIBA Under-19 World Championship, he averaged 15.8 points, 3.8 rebounds and 2.1 assists on an underperforming Chinese team. In the Chinese Basketball Association, he averaged 18.2 points, 6.3 rebounds and 3.4 assists throughout the regular season with tremendous improvements towards the end of the season. Many experts saw him as China´s next major NBA prospect. Accordingly, the diagnosis of osteosarcoma and subsequent end of his basketball career came to the dismay of Chinese basketball fans.
