= Ángel García (basketball, born 1988) =

Puerto Rican basketball player

Personal information
- Born: July 11, 1988 (age 38) Toa Baja, Puerto Rico
- Listed height: 6 ft 11 in (2.11 m)
- Listed weight: 245 lb (111 kg)

Career information
- High school: Central (East Chicago, Indiana)
- College: Memphis (2009–2011)
- Playing career: 2010–2025
- Position: Center
- Number: 41

Career history
- 2010–2011: CB Axarquía
- 2011–2012: CB Granada
- 2012–2013: Toyama Grouses
- 2013: Vaqueros de Bayamon
- 2014: Caciques de Humacao
- 2015: Mets de Guaynabo
- 2016: Piratas de Quebradillas
- 2016–2017: Toyama Grouses
- 2017–2018: Capitanes de Arecibo
- 2018–2019: Atléticos de San Germán
- 2019–2020: Santeros de Aguada
- 2020–2021: Cangrejeros de Santurce
- 2021–2023: Cariduros de Fajardo
- 2024–2025: Santeros de Aguada

Ángel Luis García García (born July 11, 1988) is a Puerto Rican former professional basketball player, who spent the majority of his career in the Baloncesto Superior Nacional (BSN). He played college basketball for the Memphis Tigers.

García began playing basketball in his native municipality, before moving to Lake Forest, Illinois, and playing one year for Lake Forest Academy, then transferring to East Chicago, Indiana, where he attended East Chicago Central High School. García, Kawann Short and E'Twaun Moore led E.C. Central to a 23-3 overall record and won the Indiana Class 4A state title. While in high school, he was included in the World Team that participated in the Nike Hoops Summit.

García was recruited to the University of Memphis by John Calipari, but was unable to play during his freshman year after confronting difficulties to meet the standards of the NCAA's Eligibility Center. After being cleared, he was included in the roster but suffered an MCL injury that kept him inactive for months. Despite being expected to miss the entire season, García was cleared to play in February, participating with the team throughout the final stages of the season and post-season tournaments.

In December 2010, he signed with CB Málaga of the Liga ACB in Spain after playing only limited time in the gaming scheme of Memphis' new coach, Josh Pastner. García debuted as a professional in the team's LEB Oro affiliate CB Axarquía. In 2011, García signed to play for CB Granada. García tore the ligaments of his right knee on 11 October during a practice with the team.

In 2013, during the BSN draft, his rights with the Piratas de Quebradillas were traded to the Vaqueros de Bayamón. He played for several teams in Puerto Rico afterwards. Following his retirement in 2025, he began working as a basketball teacher, helping young kids and teens learn how to play.
