= Louaize Club =

Leaders Club
- League: Lebanese Basketball League
- Founded: 1978
- Arena: Louaize Stadium
- Capacity: 1000
- Location: Zouk Mosbeh, Lebanon
- Team colors: Blue, White
- President: Father Ziad Antoun
- Head coach: Elie Sfier
- Team captain: Jimmy Salem
Home	Away

Leaders Club is the basketball department of Notre Dame University – Louaize, a university basketball club basked in Zouk Mosbeh. The club was established in the founding year of 1978 and participated in the 2022 Lebanese Basketball League.

== Squad ==
Leaders roster
Players
Coaches

Pos.	No.	Nat.	Name	Ht.
G	1	(Lebanon)	Hijazi, Malek	1.91 m (6 ft 3 in)
F	9	(Lebanon)	Dheini, Nader	1.99 m (6 ft 6 in)
SF	12	(Lebanon)	Khalil, Christophe	1.93 m (6 ft 4 in)
G	15	(Lebanon)	Nemer, Jad	1.78 m (5 ft 10 in)
G	16	(Lebanon)	Haddad, Mike	1.88 m (6 ft 2 in)
G	22	(Lebanon)	Ghantous, Youssef	1.90 m (6 ft 3 in)

Head coach

- (Lebanon) Marwan Khalil

Legend

- (C) Team captain
- Injured

=== Depth chart ===
Pos.	Starting 5	Bench 1	Bench 2
C			Jad Bitar
PF		Nader Dheini
SF	Christophe Khalil
SG	Malik Hijazi		Mike Haddad
PG	Youssef Ghantous	Jad Nemer

== Achievements ==
- Lebanese Division 2
  - Winners (1): 2015
- Syrian Basketball Super Cup
  - Quarterfinals: 2022

== Men's Futsal program ==
The Louaize men's futsal program competes in the Lebanese Futsal League.

== Women's basketball program ==
The Louaize women's basketball program competes in various combined college competitions in Lebanon.

== See also ==
- Notre Dame University – Louaize
