= Romain Duport =

French basketball player

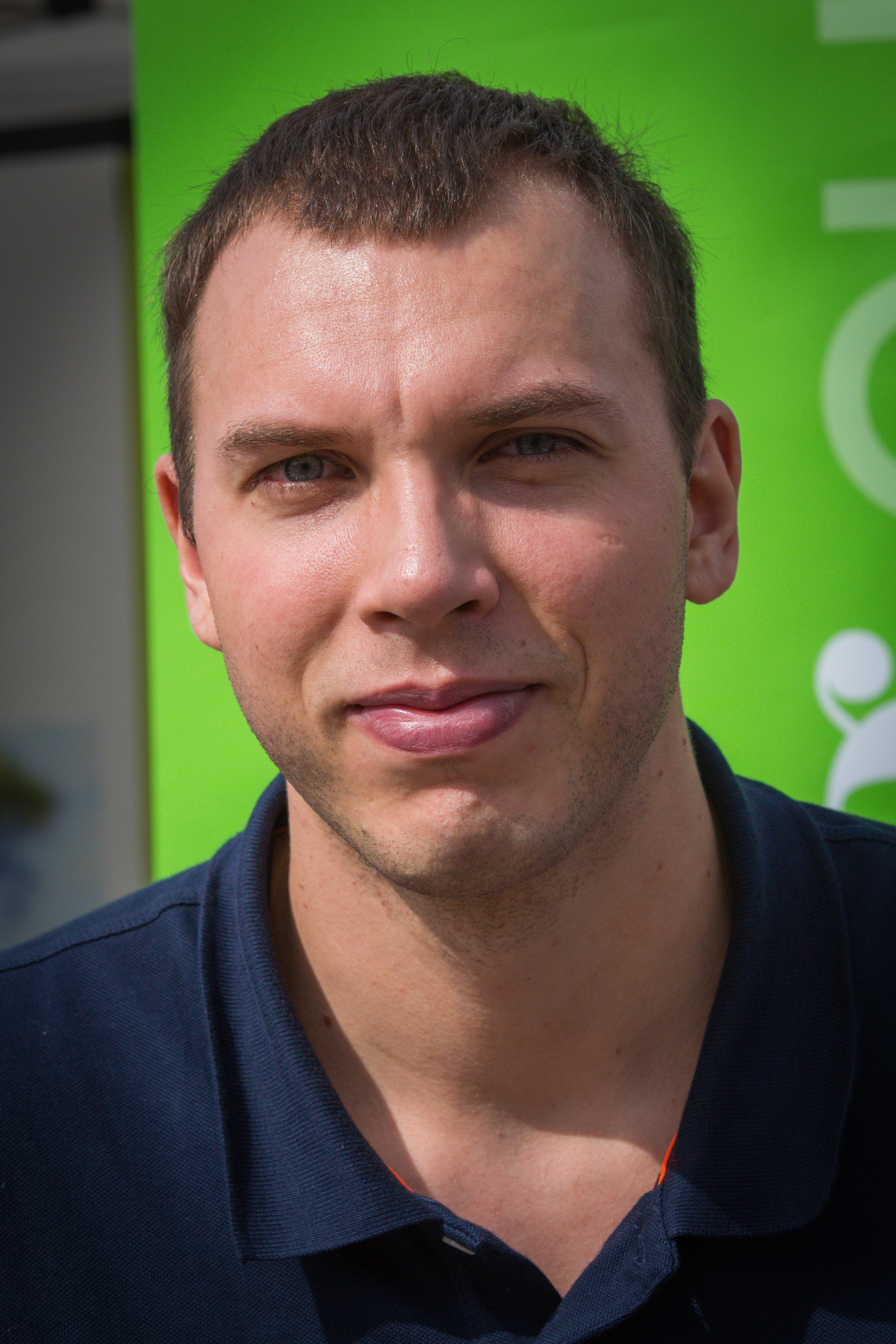
- Romain Duport, 2013

No. 45 – Champagne Châlons-Reims
- Position: Center
- League: LNB Pro A

Personal information
- Born: 10 December 1986 (age 39) Angers
- Listed height: 7 ft 1.43 in (2.17 m)
- Listed weight: 254 lb (115 kg)

Career information
- NBA draft: 2008: undrafted
- Playing career: 2004–present

Career history
- 2004–2010: Le Havre
- 2010–2011: Cholet
- 2011–2016: Strasbourg
- 2016–2017: Limoges
- 2017–present: Champagne Châlons-Reims

Romain Duport (born 10 December 1986) is a French professional basketball player for Champagne Châlons-Reims Basket of the French League.

== Amateur career ==
Born in Angers, France, Duport developed his basketball abilities through the Youth academies of Cholet Basket, Angers BC 49 and mainly STB Le Havre. With the Youth team of STB Le Havre, he won the French Pro A Youth team championship in 2007 and was named in the All French Pro A Youth First Team.

== Professional career ==
Romain Duport started its professional debuts with Le Havre in the 2004–05 season making one appearance on the court. His minutes with the professional team slowly increased through the seasons up to 17 minutes in the 2009–2010 season. However, he suffered injuries and played only 9 games with Le Havre for his last season with the club. For the 2010–2011 season, he joined the 2010 French champion Cholet Basket. He was mainly selected due to its rare height (7'1) in French Pro A championship and to allow Cholet Basket to have a real Big Man in its roster to play against other centers of the Euroleague.

On 7 September 2016 Duport signed with Limoges CSP.
