= Antoine Diot =

French basketball player

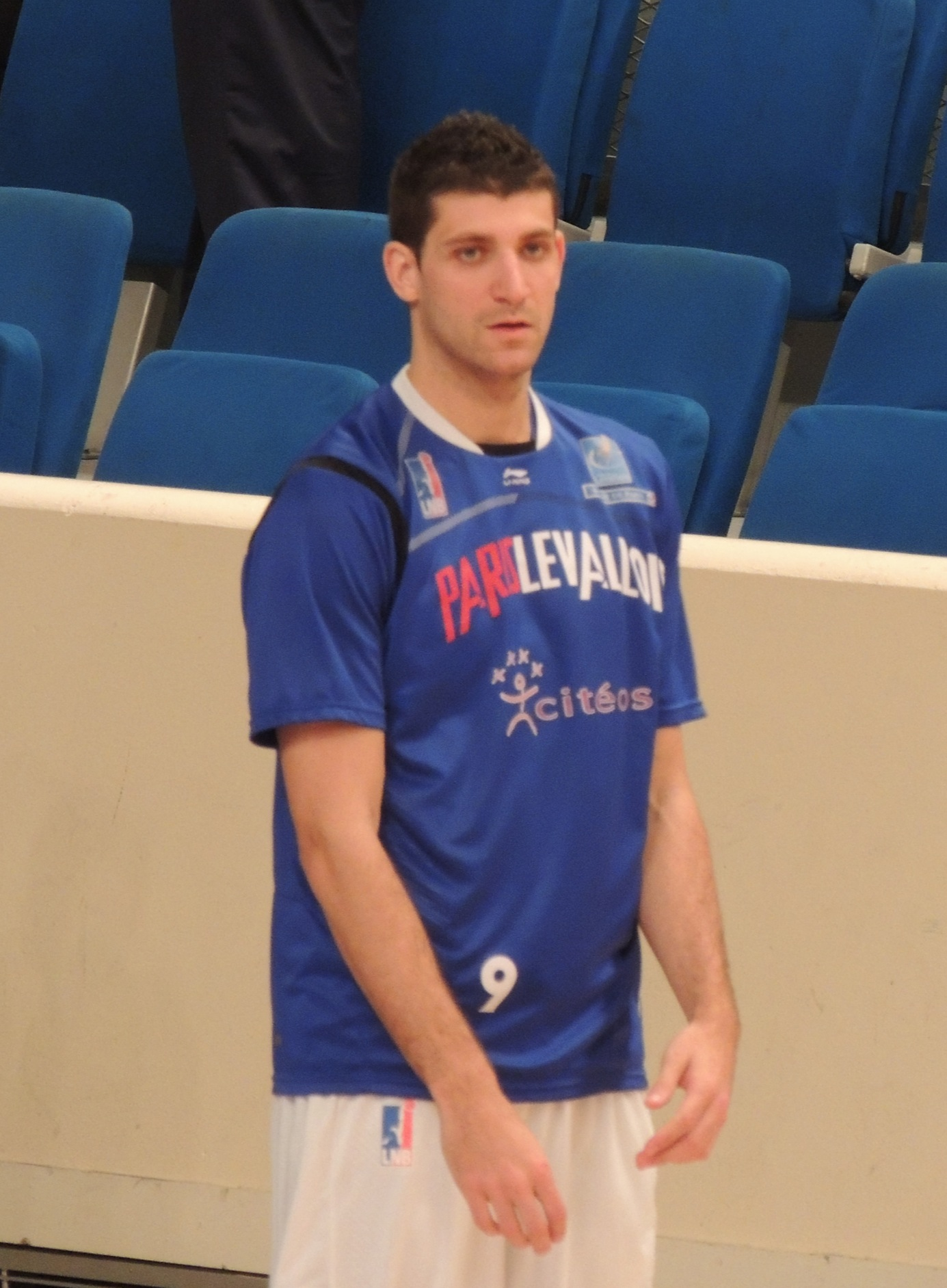
- Diot warming-up with Paris-Levallois Basket in 2012

No. 8 – Chorale Roanne
- Position: Point guard / shooting guard
- League: LNB Élite

Personal information
- Born: 17 January 1989 (age 37) Bourg-en-Bresse, France
- Listed height: 1.93 m (6 ft 4 in)
- Listed weight: 86 kg (190 lb)

Career information
- NBA draft: 2011: undrafted
- Playing career: 2004–present

Career history
- 2004–2007: Centre Fédéral
- 2007–2012: Le Mans
- 2012–2013: Paris-Levallois
- 2013–2015: SIG Strasbourg
- 2015–2019: Valencia Basket
- 2019–2023: ASVEL
- 2023–present: Chorale Roanne

Career highlights
- 2x Pro A champion (2021, 2022); Pro B champion (2026); Spanish League champion (2017); Spanish Supercup winner (2017); EuroCup champion (2019); French Leaders Cup MVP (2015); French League Domestic MVP (2014); 4× French League All-Star (2009, 2012–2014); 2× French Leaders Cup winner (2009, 2015); 4× French Cup winner (2009, 2013, 2015, 2021); FIBA Europe Under-16 Championship MVP (2005)
Medals
Representing France
FIBA World Cup
Bronze medal – third place	2014 Spain
EuroBasket
Gold medal – first place	2013 Slovenia
U-19 World Cup
Bronze medal – third place	2007 Serbia
European U-20 Championship
Silver medal – second place	2009 Greece
European U-18 Championship
Gold medal – first place	2006 Greece	U-18 Team
European U-16 Championship
Gold medal – first place	2004 Greece	U-16 Team
Silver medal – second place	2005 Spain	U-16 Team

Antoine Camille Diot (born 17 January 1989) is a French professional basketball player for Chorale Roanne of the LNB Élite. Standing at 1.93 m (6 ft 4 in), he plays the point guard position. He also represents the French national basketball team.

== Professional career ==
Diot began playing basketball with the youth teams of the French club JL Bourg en Bresse. He then played with Centre Fédéral, in the French 3rd-tier level league, the NM1, from 2004 to 2007. He began his professional career in 2007, with the French 1st-tier level Pro A League club, Le Mans. He moved to the French club Paris-Levallois Basket in 2012.

On 1 July 2013 Diot signed a two-year deal with the French Pro A team Strasbourg IG, with an opt-out clause after the first year. He was voted the French League French Player's MVP in 2014. In June 2014, he opted to remain with the team for one more season. He was voted the French Leaders Cup MVP in 2015.

On 10 July 2015 he signed a two-year contract with the Spanish ACB team Valencia Basket. With Valencia, he won the Spanish League 2016–17 season championship. On 5 July 2017 he signed a two-year contract extension with Valencia.

On 11 June 2023 he signed with Chorale Roanne Basket of the LNB Pro A.

== National team career ==
Diot was a member of the French junior national teams. With France's junior national teams, he played at the following tournaments: the 2004 FIBA Europe Under-16 Championship, where he won a gold medal, the 2005 FIBA Europe Under-16 Championship, where he won a silver medal, and was named the tournament's MVP, the 2006 FIBA Europe Under-18 Championship, where he won a gold medal, the 2007 FIBA Under-19 World Championship, where he won a bronze medal, the 2007 FIBA Europe Under-18 Championship, the 2008 FIBA Europe Under-20 Championship, and the 2009 FIBA Europe Under-20 Championship, where he won a silver medal, and was named to the All-Tournament Team.

Diot then became a member of the senior men's French national basketball team. With France's senior national team, he has played at the following major tournaments: the EuroBasket 2009, the EuroBasket 2013, where he won a gold medal, the 2014 FIBA Basketball World Cup, where he won a silver medal, and the 2016 Summer Olympics.

=== French senior national team stats ===
Tournament	GP	PPG	RPG	APG
EuroBasket 2009	8	5.1	1.9	1.0
EuroBasket 2013	11	4.5	1.6	1.1
2014 World Cup	9	6.9	2.6	2.3
2016 Olympics Qualification	4	4.8	0.8	0.5
2016 Summer Olympics	6	4.0	1.0	1.0
